= 2026–27 Coupe de France Féminine =

Tournament details
- Country: France
- Dates: 22 November 2026 – 22 May 2027
- Teams: Federal Phase: 79; Final Phase: 32
- All statistics include matches from the final phase only

The 2026–27 Coupe de France Féminine is the 26th season of the annual Coupe de France Féminine, a knockout cup competition for women's football teams in France, organised by the French Football Federation (FFF).

OL Lyonnes are the defending champions.

== Schedule ==
Schedule
| Phase | Round | Date | Teams |
|---|---|---|---|
| Federal Phase | 1st round | 22 November 2026 | 79 |
| Federal Phase | 2nd round | 13 December 2026 | 40 |
| Final Phase | Round of 32 | 10 January 2027 | 32 |
| Final Phase | Round of 16 | 31 January 2027 | 16 |
| Final Phase | Quarter-finals | 10 March 2027 | 8 |
| Final Phase | Semi-finals | 4 April 2027 | 4 |
| Final Phase | Final | 22–23 May 2027 | 2 |

== Teams ==
The first four rounds of the regional phase, including any necessary preliminaries, were organised by the Regional Leagues and the Overseas Departments/Territories, allowing teams from within their league structures to take part. Division 3 Féminine sides entered the competition at the third round.

The 68 winners from the regional phase then joined the 11 Seconde Ligue teams in the Federal Phase. After the two federal rounds, the 20 winners will advance to the Final Phase, where they will be joined by the 12 Première Ligue teams.

| Première Ligue (12) | Seconde Ligue (11) |
|---|---|
| OL Lyonnes; Paris FC; Paris Saint-Germain; FC Nantes; FC Fleury 91; RC Strasbourg Alsace; Havre AC; Les Marseillaises; Montpellier FC; RC Lens; Toulouse FC; US Saint-Malo | AS Saint-Étienne; Le Mans FC; AJ Auxerre; Grenoble Foot 38; LOSC Lille; Thonon Evian GG FC; OGC Nice; FC Metz; Bourges FC; AS Cannes; RC Roubaix Wervicq |

Teams Qualified from the Regional Phase
| Auvergne-Rhône-Alpes (9) | Bourgogne-Franche-Comté (4) | Brittany (6) | Centre-Val de Loire (3) | Corsica (1) |
|---|---|---|---|---|
| AS Saint-Martin-en-Haut; Chassieu Décines FC; Clermont Foot 63; Ent. S. Val de Saône; ES Cernex; Étoile Moulins Yzeure; Bourg Bresse Péronnas; Le Puy-en-Velay FC; Sud Lyonnais Football 2013 | Dijon Université Club; FC Montceau Bourgogne; FC Sochaux-Montbéliard; US Saint-Vit | CPB Bréquigny; FC Lorient; Plérin FC; Quimper Kerfeunteun FC; Stade Brestois 29; Stade Rennais FC | C'Chartres Football; Eleven United 45; FA Saint-Symphorien | FEC Bastiais |
| Grand Est (7) | Hauts-de-France (6) | Île-de-France (7) | Normandy (4) | Nouvelle-Aquitaine (5) |
| ES Troyes AC; FC Illhaeusern; Saint-Dizier 2MO; SR Colmar; US Azzurri Mulhouse; US Thionville Lusitanos; US Vandœuvre | Amiens SC; AS Beauvais Oise; GF BCV Laon; US Pays de Saint-Omer; Valenciennes FC; Villeneuve d'Ascq FF | AAS Sarcelles; FC Rueil-Malmaison; JS Suresnes; Paris SO Cœur; Red Star FC; Seizième ES; US Sénart-Moissy | AG Caen; FC Saint-Lô Manche; Quevilly RM; SM Caen | ASJ Soyaux-Charente; Aviron Bayonnais; ES Guérétoise; FC Talence; Pau FC |
| Occitania (6) | Pays de la Loire (5) | Méditerranée (3) | Antilles-Guyane | Océan Indien |
| Albi Marssac TF; FC Arceaux Montpellier; Jacou Clapiers FA; Montauban FCTG; Nîmes Football Féminin; Rodez AF | CS Changé; ESOF Vendée La Roche-sur-Yon; GF Pouzauges Châtaigneraie; Orvault SF; Saint-Georges-Guyonnière | FC Rousset Ste. Victoire; Saint-Didier Pernoise; Monaco United | Martinique (1) Club Franciscain; Guadeloupe (0); French Guiana (0) | Réunion (1) Saint-Pauloise FC; Mayotte (0) |

== Federal Phase ==
The draw for the two rounds of the federal phase took place on 4 November 2026 at 12:00 at the French Football Federation headquarters in Paris, France.

=== First federal round ===
Group A

| 21 November 2026 N°1 | RC Roubaix Wervicq F. (2) | 5–0 | (4) (Martinique) Club Franciscain | Roubaix |
| 14:00 | Tchaptchet 30', 53'; Gomes 38', 89'; Theriez 84' | Report | Briler (red card) 75' | Stadium: Stade Antoine-Maillard; Referee: Mila Teixeira |

| 22 November 2026 N°2 | CPB Bréquigny Rennes (3) | 0–1 | (3) SM Caen | Rennes |
| 14:30 | | Report | Fall 74' | Stadium: Complexe Sportif de Bréquigny 4 Referee: Laura Bouchaud |

| 21 November 2026 N°3 | GF BCV Laon (5) | 0–2 | (4) Red Star FC | Laon |
| 19:30 | | Report | Crapanzano 49' (o.g.); Lebas 75' (red card) 89' | Stadium: Stade Marcel Levindrey N°1; Referee: Alice Raybaudi |

| 21 November 2026 N°4 | Sénart Moissy (6) | 0–7 | (4) US Pays de Saint-Omer | Moissy-Cramayel |
| 18:00 | | Report | Dollet 1', 40'; Ringard 33', 58'; Arnout 59', 86'; Ogez 85' | Stadium: Stade Paul Raban; Referee: Irysse Machometa |

| 22 November 2026 N°5 | Villeneuve d'Ascq FF (4) | 3–0 | (4) AS Beauvais Oise | Villeneuve-d'Ascq |
| 14:30 | El Yagoubi 45'; Pavy 48'; Berremila 73' | Report | | Stadium: Stade Jean-Jacques; Referee: Déborah Coulon |

| 22 November 2026 N°6 | Valenciennes FC (4) | 3–0 | (4) Amiens SC | Famars |
| 14:30 | Maronat 2'; Domont 48'; Bantignie 65' | Report | | Stadium: Centre Technique VAFC Syn 1 Referee: Lucie Lempereur |

| 22 November 2026 N°7 | C'Chartres Football (4) | 0–8 | (2) LOSC Lille | Chartres |
| 14:30 | | Report | Gaucher 7', 33', 44'; Felix 48'; Neller 50'; Bouzid 67'; Lebargy 88', 90' | Stadium: Stade James Delarue; Referee: Jade Mongiat |

| 21 November 2026 N°8 | Quevilly RM (3) | 2–2 (4–2 p) | (4) (Réunion) Saint-Pauloise FC | Le Petit-Quevilly |
| 14:00 | Chauvin-Ly 53'; Boullonnois 64' | Report | Macé 9'; Chamand 90' | Stadium: Stade Michel-Mutel; Referee: Marine Verrier |

Group B

| 22 November 2026 N°9 | Dijon Université Club (5) | 1–3 | (4) SR Colmar FA | Dijon |
| 14:30 | Salihu 63' | Report | Andreoletti 18', 67'; Philipp 76' | Stadium: Stade du SUAPS 2 Synthétique; Referee: Jeanne Creignou |

| 22 November 2026 N°10 | Saint Dizier 2MO (4) | 0–11 | (3) Clermont Foot 63 | Saint-Dizier |
| 14:30 | | Report | | Stadium: Stade Charles Jacquin 2 Referee: Amélia Fernandez |

| 22 November 2026 N°11 | US Azzurri Mulhouse (4) | 1–3 | (3) AAS Sarcelles | Riedisheim |
| 14:30 | Salzard 71' | Report | Ly 9', 50'; Dias 57' | Stadium: Parc des Sports Waldeck 2 Referee: Charlotte Cellier-Devaux |

| 22 November 2026 N°12 | Bourg Bresse Péronnas (4) | 3–0 | (4) FC Montceau Bourgogne | Péronnas |
| 15:30 | Boi 25', 47'; Berraud 50' | Report | | Stadium: Stade Municipal 1 Referee: Lina El Ghalmani |

| 21 November 2026 N°13 | FC Sochaux-Montbéliard (4) | 1–2 | (3) ESTAC Troyes | Seloncourt |
| 14:30 | Letondelle 90' | Report | Wittmann 57', 65' | Stadium: Stade du Centre de Formation; Referee: Mathilde Delorme |

| 22 November 2026 N°14 | FC Metz (2) | 0–0 (8–7 p) | (2) Thonon Evian GG FC | Longeville-lès-Metz |
| 14:00 | | Report | | Stadium: Stade Dezavelle; Referee: Manon Floret-Bossoreille |

| 22 November 2026 N°15 | US Saint-Vit (4) | 8–0 | (5) US Thionville Lusitanos | Saint-Vit |
| 14:30 | Bailly 16', 60'; Lhéritier 25'; Fedi 35', 37'; Schnoebelen 73'; Geslot 81', 86' | Report | | Stadium: Stade Christian Doussot 2 Referee: Elyne Obringer |

| 22 November 2026 N°16 | FC Illhaeusern (6) | 1–4 | (5) US Vandœuvre | Illhaeusern |
| 14:30 | Nischwitz 85' | Report | Oummi 32', 77'; Villaume 76'; Saïdina 90' | Stadium: Stade de l'Ill 1 |

Group C

| 22 November 2026 N°17 | Arceaux Montpellier (5) | 0–3 | (2) Grenoble Foot 38 | Juvignac |
| 14:30 | | Report | Baga 18'; Chabrier 63'; Mazza 69' | Stadium: Complexe Sportif Ludwig Guttmann; Referee: Maissa Ammar |

| 22 November 2026 N°18 | AS Saint-Martin en Haut (4) | 0–0 (4–1 p) | (4) Chassieu Décines FC | Saint-Martin-en-Haut |
| 14:30 | | Report | | Stadium: Stade Municipal; Referee: Marie Régnier |

| 22 November 2026 N°19 | FC Rousset Ste. Victoire (3) | 1–0 | (4) Nîmes Foot Féminin | Rousset |
| 14:30 | Anduma 53' | Report | | Stadium: Stade de la Plaine Sportive 1 Referee: Marie Gilloux |

| 22 November 2026 N°20 | Saint-Didier Pernoise (4) | 2–1 | (2) AS Cannes | Pernes-les-Fontaines |
| 14:30 | Ferretti 8'; Schiappa 75' | Report | Pacaud 73' | Stadium: Stade Gustave Rame; Referee: Lauren Perret |

| 22 November 2026 N°21 | Jacou Clapiers FA (4) | 1–2 | (2) OGC Nice | Jacou |
| 14:30 | Doladille 43' | Report | Laurier 86'; Bekhaled 90' | Stadium: Stade Yves Mandler; Referee: Cyndelle Aggoune |

| 22 November 2026 N°22 | FEC Bastiais (4) | 2–4 | (4) (Monaco) Moanco United | Borgo |
| 14:30 | Tall 43', 90' | Report | Achouri 19'; Drion 31'; Robert 71'; Ben Rabah 90' | Stadium: Stade Paul Antoniotti; Referee: Carla Benedetto |

| 22 November 2026 N°23 | ES Cernex (5) | v | (3) Le Puy-en-Velay FC | Copponex |
| 14:30 | | Report | | Stadium: Stade des Chardons; Referee: Marion Salemme |

| 22 November 2026 N°24 | Sud Lyonnais F. 2013 (5) | 2–1 | (6) ES Val de Saône | Communay |
| 14:30 | Berrimi 21'; Debierre 42' | Report | Corrand 35' | Stadium: Stade de la Plaine 2 Referee: Floresa Mustafa |

Group D

| 22 November 2026 N°25 | Et. Moulins Yzeure (6) | 3–3 (3–4 p) | (4) FA St. Symphorien Tours | Yzeure |
| 14:30 | Chamoux 18'; Parfait 50', 55' | Report | Devaux 14', 25'; Coquet 63' | Stadium: Stade de Bellevue N°1; Referee: Florence Guillemin |

| 22 November 2026 N°26 | CS Changé (4) | 1–1 (5–3 p) | (5) GF Pouzauges Chât. | Changé |
| 14:30 | Plu 47' | Report | Raffin 90' | Stadium: Stade Gabriel Martin; Referee: Aya Bghiyel-Ahocal |

| 22 November 2026 N°27 | Bourges FC (2) | 2–1 | (3) Rodez AF | Bourges |
| 14:30 | Léger 53'; Étienne 85' | Report | Micard 48' | Stadium: Stade Jacques-Rimbault 1 Referee: Elina Plainchamp |

| N°28 | Bye | (3) Albi Marssac TF |

| 22 November 2026 N°29 | Aviron Bayonnais FC (4) | 1–7 | (3) Montauban FC TG | Bayonne |
| 14:30 | Souverbie 53' | Report | Lambert 5'; Bonnin-Suire 45'; Blanchard 48'; Hayaux 58'; Cosme 74', 90'; Ouillon 87' | Stadium: Stade Didier Deschamps 2 Referee: Lisa Coste |

| 22 November 2026 N°30 | ES Guérétoise (5) | 0–13 | (2) AS Saint-Étienne | Guéret |
| 15:00 | | Report | Chabourine 8', 23', 25', 28', 41'; Mansuy 15'; Chicha Douvier 22', 89'; Scannapieco 37', 70', 84'; Couasnon 43'; Belhout-Achi 81' | Stadium: Stade Léo-Lagrange 1 Referee: Mathilde Beaufils |

| 21 November 2026 N°31 | ESOF Vendée La Roche (3) | 2–1 | (4) Pau FC | La Roche-sur-Yon |
| 18:00 | Henry 61'; Moutault 81' | Report | Rodrigues 18' | Stadium: Stade de Saint-André d'Ornay 1 Referee: Angèle Poublanc |

| 22 November 2026 N°32 | FC Talence (4) | Postponed | (4) ASJ Soyaux-Charente | Talence |
| 14:30 | | Report | | Stadium: Stade de Thouars 4 Referee: Clara Blanchais |

Group E

| 22 November 2026 N°33 | Seizième ES (4) | 1–1 (2–4 p) | (4) Stade Brestois 29 | Paris |
| 14:30 | Konaté 60' | Report | Friedmann 50' (red card) 90' | Stadium: Stade de l'Hippodrome Auteuil; Referee: Manon Persichetti |

| 22 November 2026 N°34 | Suresnes JS (6) | 0–10 | (3) St. Georges Guyonnière | Rueil-Malmaison |
| 14:30 | | Report | Julien Coyet 11', 23'; Launais 14'; Daheron 36', 51'; Triballeau 58'; Demraoui 67', 88'; Dezitter 79', 89' | Stadium: Stade Maurice-Haubert N°1; Referee: Leila Agic |

| 22 November 2026 N°35 | Paris SO Cœur (4) | 0–0 (7–6 p) | (4) Plérin FC | Issy-les-Moulineaux |
| 14:30 | | Report | | Stadium: Cité des Sports; Referee: Karine Beaupère |

| 22 November 2026 N°36 | FC Saint-Lô Manche (4) | 0–4 | (3) Orvault SF | Saint-Lô |
| 14:30 | | Report | Onorato 13', 25'; Louison 76', 90' | Stadium: Stade des Ronchettes 3 Referee: Shérine Nouader |

| 22 November 2026 N°37 | AJ Auxerre (2) | 1–1 (6–5 p) | (3) Stade Rennais FC | Auxerre |
| 14:30 | | Report | | Stadium: Stade Abbé Deschamps A3; Referee: Karen Robin |

| N°38 | ~~Eleven United 45~~ (6) | Cancelled (Note: The match was cancelled after the FFF ruled that Eleven United 45, competing as a joint team between two clubs, were ineligible to participate in the competition.) | (2) Le Mans FC |

| 22 November 2026 N°39 | Quimper Kerfeunteun (4) | 1–2 | (4) FC Rueil-Malmaison | Quimper |
| 14:30 | Merland 79' | Report | Boughrara 11'; Dicko 65' | Stadium: Complexe Sportif de Penvillers 2 Referee: Lou Guillet |

| 21 November 2026 N°40 | Avant-Garde Caen Foot. (4) | 0–2 | (3) FC Lorient | Caen |
| 19:00 | | Report | Gilles 50'; Planson 58' | Stadium: Stade de Venoix 1 - Claude-Mercier; Referee: Bess Guesdon |

== See also ==
- 2026–27 Première Ligue
- 2026–27 Seconde Ligue
- 2026–27 Coupe LFFP
