= 2026–27 Seconde Ligue =

39th season of 2nd-tier French women's football league

Seconde Ligue
- Season: 2026–27
- Dates: 6 September 2026 – 9 May 2027

The 2026–27 Seconde Ligue season is the 39th season of the second tier of national women's football league in France and the third season since its rebranding as the Seconde Ligue.

The season will begin on 6 September 2026 and is scheduled to end on 9 May 2026.

== Teams ==
Location of teams in the 2026–27 Seconde Ligue

Team	Home city	Home ground	2025–26 season
Auxerre	Auxerre	Stade de l'Abbé-Deschamps	4th
Bourges	Bourges	Stade Jacques-Rimbault	Division 3, 1st Group A ▲
Cannes	Cannes	Stade Maurice-Chevalier	Division 3, 1st Group B ▲
Grenoble	Grenoble	Stade Stijovic N°1	5th
Le Mans	Le Mans	Parc des Sports La Californie 1	3rd
Lille	Lille	Stadium Terrain N°1	6th
Metz	Metz	Stade Dezavelle	8th
Nice	Nice	Stade de la Plaine du Var N°1	10th
Roubaix Wervicq	Roubaix	Stade Antoine-Maillard	Division 3, 2nd Group A ▲
Saint-Étienne	Saint-Étienne	Stade Salif-Keita	Première Ligue, 12th ▼
Thonon Évian	Ambilly	Stade Joseph-Moynat 1	7th

=== Team changes ===
Entering league		Exiting league		
Promoted from 2025–26 Division 3	Relegated from 2025–26 Première Ligue	Promoted to 2026–27 Première Ligue	Relegated to 2026–27 Division 3	Relegated to 2026–27 Régional 1 Féminine Grand Est (fourth tier)
Bourges; Cannes; Roubaix Wervicq (Note: Following serious financial difficulties and after finishing ninth in the 2025–26 Seconde Ligue, Reims withdrew from the 2026–27 Seconde Ligue and the 2026–2027 Division 3 Féminine, meaning the team will return to the fourth tier (2026–27 Régional 1 Féminine Grand Est). Consequently, a place was vacant in the 2026–27 Seconde Ligue, Rodez, who finished eleventh in the 2025–26 Seconde Ligue, and the first team that could have benefited from a 2026–27 Seconde Ligue repechage, has decided not to enter the 2026–27 Seconde Ligue. So the vacant place was handed over to Roubaix Wervicq, the second team that could have benefited from a 2026–27 Seconde Ligue promotion/repechage. Roubaix Wervicq finished second in the Group A of the 2025–26 Division 3 Féminine.); ~~Caen~~ (Note: Following serious financial difficulties and after finishing sixth in the 2025–26 Première Ligue, Dijon was excluded from national competitions by the DNCG due to insufficient financial guarantees for the 2026–27 season. The club did not appeal this decision and was replaced by Lens in the 2026–27 Première Ligue. Lens finished eleventh in the 2025–26 Première Ligue. Consequently, a place was vacant in the 2026–27 Seconde Ligue, Albi Marssac TF, who finished second in the Group B of the 2025–26 Division 3 Féminine, and the third team that could have benefited from a 2026–27 Seconde Ligue promotion/repechage (after Rodez and Roubaix Wervicq), has decided not to enter the 2026–27 Seconde Ligue because of financial difficulties. OL Lyonnes II (the reserve team of OL Lyonnes), who finished third in the Group B of the 2025–26 Division 3 Féminine, was ineligible for promotion into the 2026–27 Seconde Ligue. So the vacant place was handed over to Caen, the fourth team that could have benefited from a 2026–27 Seconde Ligue promotion/repechage. Caen finished third in the Group A of the 2025–26 Division 3 Féminine. Caen finally decided to turn down this offer to move up to the Second Ligue citing "In such a short timeframe, it is impossible to secure the additional funding and partnerships that a project of this kind requires". The 2026–27 Seconde Ligue will be played with only 11 teams.)	Saint-Étienne	Toulouse; Saint-Malo	Rodez; Guingamp	Reims

== Season ==
=== Standings ===
Pos	Team	Pld	W	D	L	GF	GA	GD	Pts	Qualification or relegation
1	Le Mans	1	1	0	0	2	1	+1	3	Promotion to Première Ligue
2	Metz	1	1	0	0	1	0	+1	3	Promotion to Première Ligue
3	Lille	1	1	0	0	3	2	+1	3	
4	Saint-Étienne	1	0	1	0	1	1	0	1	
5	Thonon Évian	1	0	1	0	1	1	0	1	
6	Nice	1	0	1	0	1	1	0	1	
7	Cannes	1	0	1	0	1	1	0	1	
8	Roubaix Wervicq	0	0	0	0	0	0	0	0	
9	Grenoble	1	0	0	1	0	1	−1	0	
10	Bourges	1	0	0	1	1	2	−1	0	
11	Auxerre	1	0	0	1	2	3	−1	0	Relegation to Division 3 Féminine

Updated to match(es) played on 6 September 2026. Source:
Rules for classification: 1) points; 2) head-to-head points; 3) head-to-head goal difference; 4) goal difference; 5) goals scored

=== Results ===
Home \ Away	AUX	BOU	CAN	GRN	MAN	LIL	MTZ	NIC	ROU	SET	THN
Auxerre	—										
Bourges		—			1–2						
Cannes			—								
Grenoble				—			0–1				
Le Mans					—						
Lille	3–2					—					
Metz							—				
Nice			1–1					—			
Roubaix Wervicq									—		
Saint-Étienne										—	
Thonon Évian										1–1	—

Updated to match(es) played on 6 September 2026. Source:
Legend: Blue = home team win; Yellow = draw; Red = away team win.

== Season statistics ==
As of 6 September 2026

=== Scoring ===
- First goal of the season:
  - TBD

=== Top goalscorers ===
Rank	Player	Club	Goals

=== Top assists ===
Rank	Player	Club	Assists

=== Most clean sheets ===
Rank	Player	Club	Clean sheets

=== Discipline ===
Most yellow cards	Total	Most red cards	Total

== See also ==
- 2026–27 Première Ligue
- 2026–27 Coupe LFFP
