= 2026–27 Coupe LFFP =

Tournament details
- Country: France
- Dates: 22 August 2026 – 10 April 2027
- Teams: 23

The 2026–27 Coupe de la Ligue féminine de football professionnel, commonly referred to as 2026–27 Coupe LFFP, is the second edition of the competition, the annual Première and Seconde Ligue's league cup competition.

== Format ==
On 17 February 2026, the Executive committee (Comex) of the French Football Federation (FFF) approved and unveiled the new competition format during a meeting in Paris. The format was revised to adopt a league phase inspired by the UEFA Champions League, replacing the geographically based group stage used in the inaugural edition.

League phase

Clubs from the Première and Seconde Ligue that are not participating in European competitions are placed in a single league table. Each team plays four matches (two at home and two away) against different opponents across five matchdays. Some teams have a bye on each matchday, ensuring that every club plays four matches in total.

Once the five matchdays are completed, the ten highest-placed teams progress to the play-offs.

Play-offs

The ten qualified teams are drawn into five single-match ties. The five highest-ranked sides from the league phase are seeded and play at home. The five winners progress to the quarter-finals.

Knockout phase

The quarter-finals feature the five play-off winners alongside the three European-qualified clubs, forming an eight-team knockout stage. The quarter-finals, semi-finals and final are all contested as single-leg ties.

== League phase ==
Pos	Team	Pld	W	PW	PL	L	GF	GA	GD	Pts	Qualification
1	Les Marseillaises	3	3	0	0	0	12	1	+11	9	Advance to the knockout phase play-offs (seeded)
2	FC Fleury 91	3	3	0	0	0	9	2	+7	9	Advance to the knockout phase play-offs (seeded)
3	RC Strasbourg Alsace	3	3	0	0	0	8	5	+3	9	Advance to the knockout phase play-offs (seeded)
4	AJ Auxerre	3	2	1	0	0	9	3	+6	8	Advance to the knockout phase play-offs (seeded)
5	RC Lens	4	2	0	1	1	6	5	+1	7	Advance to the knockout phase play-offs (seeded)
6	Thonon Evian GG FC	4	1	2	0	1	7	11	−4	7	Advance to the knockout phase play-offs (unseeded)
7	Le Mans FC	3	2	0	0	1	5	1	+4	6	Advance to the knockout phase play-offs (unseeded)
8	AS Saint-Étienne	3	2	0	0	1	6	4	+2	6	Advance to the knockout phase play-offs (unseeded)
9	Havre AC	3	2	0	0	1	5	5	0	6	Advance to the knockout phase play-offs (unseeded)
10	RC Roubaix-Wervicq	3	2	0	0	1	4	4	0	6	Advance to the knockout phase play-offs (unseeded)
11	US Saint-Malo	3	1	1	0	1	4	2	+2	5	
12	FC Nantes	3	1	0	1	1	3	3	0	4	
13	Montpellier FC	3	1	0	0	2	4	6	−2	3	
14	AS Cannes	3	0	1	1	1	4	7	−3	3	
15	Grenoble Foot 38	3	1	0	0	2	3	6	−3	3	
16	Lille OSC (E)	4	0	0	2	2	5	8	−3	2	
17	OGC Nice (E)	4	0	1	0	3	5	12	−7	2	
18	Bourges FC (E)	3	0	0	1	2	2	5	−3	1	
19	Toulouse FC (E)	3	0	0	0	3	1	6	−5	0	
20	FC Metz (E)	3	0	0	0	3	3	9	−6	0	

Updated to match(es) played on 4 November 2026. Source: FFF.fr
(E) Eliminated

Matchday 1
Home team	Score	Away team
Nice	1–2	Lens
Saint-Étienne	4–2	Roubaix-Wervicq
Cannes	4–4 (2–4 p)	Thonon Évian
Lille	0–2	Montpellier
Strasbourg	2–1	Bourges
Metz	2–4	Auxerre
Nantes	1–1 (3–4 p)	Saint-Malo
Les Marseillaises	3–0	Toulouse
Le Mans	3–0	Grenoble

Matchday 2
Home team	Score	Away team
Bourges	0–2	Fleury
Le Havre	0–2	Nantes
Nice	2–2 (3–1 p)	Lille
Lens	3–0	Metz
Roubaix-Wervicq	1–0	Le Mans
Thonon Évian	1–0	Toulouse
Saint-Malo	3–0	Grenoble
Montpellier	0–3	Les Marseillaises

Matchday 3
Home team	Score	Away team
Auxerre	0–0 (4–2 p)	Lens
Saint-Étienne	2–0	Nantes
Fleury	3–1	Nice
Metz	1–2	Le Havre
Grenoble	3–0	Cannes
Les Marseillaises	6–1	Thonon Évian
Strasbourg	4–3	Lille

Matchday 4
Home team	Score	Away team
Montpellier	2–3	Le Havre
Lille	0–0 (2–4 p)	Cannes
Saint-Malo	0–1	Roubaix-Wervicq
Auxerre	5–1	Nice
Toulouse	1–2	Strasbourg
Thonon Évian	1–1 (4–2 p)	Bourges
Saint-Étienne	0–2	Le Mans
Lens	1–4	Fleury

Matchday 5
Home team	Score	Away team
Roubaix-Wervicq		Montpellier
Grenoble		Les Marseillaises
Le Havre		Saint-Étienne
Nantes		Toulouse
Bourges		Metz
Fleury		Auxerre
Le Mans		Saint-Malo
Cannes		Strasbourg

== Knockout phase play-offs ==
Team 1	Score	Team 2
Seeded team		Unseeded team
Seeded team		Unseeded team
Seeded team		Unseeded team
Seeded team		Unseeded team
Seeded team		Unseeded team

== Knockout phase ==
=== Bracket ===
Quarter-finals
17 February
17 February
17 February
17 February

Semi-finals
17 March
17 March

Final
10 April

== Goalscorers ==
There have been 105 goals scored in 32 matches, for an average of 3.28 goals per match (as of 4 November 2026).

3 goals

- (Benin) Lucie Tengue — Nice
- (France) Sarah Cambot — Saint-Étienne
- (Ivory Coast) Angela Malaussena — Grenoble
- (Ivory Coast) Habibou Ouédraogo — Marseille

2 goals

- (Democratic Republic of the Congo) Gloria Mabomba — Auxerre
- (England) Grace Gillard — Montpellier
- (France) Inès Belmiliani — Thonon Évian
- (France) Assia Bouktit — Metz
- (France) Mathilde Bourdieu — Marseille
- (France) Thelma Eninger — Saint-Malo
- (France) Emelyne Laurent — Fleury
- (France) Manon Lebargy — Lille
- (France) Alizée Mereau — Auxerre
- (France) Fanny Rossi — Lens
- (France) Lalie Valentino — Thonon Évian
- (Haiti) Batcheba Louis — Fleury
- (Morocco) Joye Serrano Mijan — Auxerre
- (Poland) Natalia Wróbel — Strasbourg
- (South Korea) Choi Da-kyeong — Thonon Évian
- (Tunisia) Sana Guermazi — Le Mans

1 goal

- (Algeria) Ikram Adjabi — Le Havre
- (Algeria) Shana Battouri — Bourges
- (Algeria) Sofia Bekhaled — Nice
- (Algeria) Inès Boutaleb – Auxerre
- (Algeria) Lynda Bendris — Cannes
- (Algeria) Nihed Naili — Cannes
- (Belgium) Noémie Gelders — Lens
- (Cameroon) Confidence Buh — Roubaix-Wervicq
- (Cameroon) Catherine Mbengono — Bourges
- (Cameroon) Chanel Tchaptchet — Roubaix-Wervicq
- (Cape Verde) Sylviane Gomes — Nice
- (Democratic Republic of the Congo) Esther Buabadi — Nantes
- (France) Louann Archier — Lens
- (France) Amandine Béché — Marseille
- (France) Cyrielle Blanc — Fleury
- (France) Charlotte Boisneau — Saint-malo
- (France) Annaïg Butel — Fleury
- (France) Cindy Caputo — Fleury
- (France) Célia Chabod — Montpellier
- (France) Solène Champagnac — Le Havre
- (France) Lorna Chicha Douvier — Saint-Étienne
- (France) Maureen Cosson — Marseille
- (France) Léa Declercq — Strasbourg
- (France) Célia Delaby — Lille
- (France) Sarah Djaraoui — Lille
- (France) Sofia Djoubri — Lens
- (France) Charlotte Faity — Le Mans
- (France) Louise Fleury — Marseille
- (France) Thaïs Gallais — Le Havre
- (France) Grace Kazadi — Strasbourg
- (France) Fanny Hoarau — Le Mans
- (France) Coralie Monguillon — Lille
- (France) Ella Palis — Montpellier
- (France) Jenny Perret — Marseille
- (France) Laurine Pinot — Roubaix-Wervicq
- (France) Lalie Rageot — Thonon Évian
- (France) Louna Ribadeira — Fleury
- (France) Nina Richard — Auxerre
- (France) Madeline Roth — Nantes
- (France) Zoé Stiévenart — Le Havre
- (France) Julie Thibaud — Marseille
- (France) Naolia Traoré — Le Havre
- (Germany) Luisa Guttenberger — Strasbourg
- (Germany) Kristin Kögel – Strasbourg
- (Haiti) Roseline Éloissaint — Lens
- (Republic of Ireland) Amber Barrett – Strasbourg
- (Ivory Coast) Frédérique Abrogoua — Auxerre
- (Ivory Coast) Kade Tanh — Cannes
- (Lithuania) Liucija Vaitukaitytė — Nantes
- (Morocco) Kenza Chapelle – Le Mans
- (Morocco) Sanaâ Mssoudy — Fleury
- (Portugal) Mélissa Gomes — Roubaix-Wervicq
- (Portugal) Nelly Rodrigues — Marseille
- (Switzerland) Ana-Maria Crnogorčević — Strasbourg
- (Tunisia) Salma Zemzem — Metz
- (Turkey) Selen Altunkulak – Toulouse
- (Ukraine) Inna Hlushchenko — Saint-Étienne
- (United States) Tyler Isgrig — Saint-Étienne
- (United States) Lexi Missimo — Marseille
- (United States) Megan Rucker — Saint-Malo

1 own goal

- (France) Lalie Valentino (against Cannes)

== See also ==
- 2026–27 Première Ligue
- 2026–27 Seconde Ligue
