= 2018–19 Division 1 Féminine =

Division 1 Féminine
- Season: 2018–19
- Champions: Lyon (13th title)
- Relegated: Lille; Rodez
- Champions League: Lyon; Paris Saint-Germain
- Matches: 132
- Goals: 413 (3.13 per match)
- Top goalscorer: Marie-Antoinette Katoto (22 goals)
- Biggest home win: Montpellier 11–0 Metz
- Biggest away win: Lille 0–8 Lyon
- Highest scoring: Montpellier 11–0 Metz
- Total attendance: 121,458
- Average attendance: 920

The 2018–19 Division 1 Féminine season was the 45th edition since its establishment. Lyon were the defending champions, having won the title in each of the past twelve seasons. The season began on 25 August 2018 and ended on 4 May 2019.

== Teams ==
Location of teams in 2018–19 Division 1 Féminine

Two teams were promoted from the Division 2 Féminine, the second level of women's football in France, to replace two teams that were relegated from the Division 1 Féminine following the 2017–18 season. A total of 12 teams currently compete in the league; two clubs will be relegated to the second division at the end of the season.

Teams promoted to 2018–19 Division 1 Féminine

- Dijon
- Metz

Teams relegated to 2018–19 Division 2 Féminine

- Albi
- Marseille

=== Stadia and locations ===
Club	Location	Venue	Capacity
Bordeaux	Bordeaux	Stade Sainte-Germaine (Le Bouscat)	7,000
Dijon	Dijon	Stade Des Poussots	1,500
Guingamp	Guingamp	Stade Fred-Aubert (Saint-Brieuc)	10,600
Fleury	Fleury-Mérogis	Stade Auguste Gentelet	2,000
Paris FC	Viry-Châtillon	Stade Robert-Bobin (Bondoufle)	18,850
Montpellier	Montpellier	Stade de la Mosson	32,900
Lille	Lille	Stade Pierre-Mauroy	50,157
Lyon	Lyon	Parc Olympique Lyonnais (Décines-Charpieu)	59,186
Metz	Algrange	Stade du Batzenthal	2,500
Paris Saint-Germain	Paris	Stade Sébastien Charléty	20,000
Rodez	Rodez	Stade Paul-Lignon	5,955
Soyaux	Soyaux	Stade Camille-Lebon (Angoulême)	6,500

== League standings ==
=== League table ===
Pos	Team	Pld	W	D	L	GF	GA	GD	Pts	Qualification or relegation
1	Lyon (C)	22	20	2	0	89	6	+83	62	Qualification for the Champions League round of 32
2	Paris Saint-Germain	22	18	3	1	62	16	+46	57	Qualification for the Champions League round of 32
3	Montpellier	22	12	3	7	51	27	+24	39	
4	Bordeaux	22	10	4	8	26	34	−8	34	
5	Paris FC	22	9	5	8	34	28	+6	32	
6	Soyaux	22	7	6	9	19	37	−18	27	
7	Guingamp	22	6	6	10	24	33	−9	24	
8	Dijon	22	7	3	12	29	44	−15	24	
9	Fleury	22	5	7	10	24	34	−10	22	
10	Metz	22	6	1	15	21	63	−42	19	
11	Lille (R)	22	4	6	12	20	43	−23	18	Relegation to Division 2 Féminine
12	Rodez (R)	22	3	4	15	14	48	−34	13	Relegation to Division 2 Féminine

Source: Soccerway FFF
Rules for classification: 1) points; 2) head-to-head points; 3) head-to-head goal difference; 4) goal difference; 5) goals scored
(C) Champions; (R) Relegated

== Attendance ==
=== Average home attendances ===
Ranked from highest to lowest average attendance.

Team	GP	Attendance	High	Low	Average
Lyon	11	35,372	25,907	639	3,215
Paris Saint-Germain	11	19,043	8,704	523	1,731
Dijon	11	13,431	4,164	607	1,221
Bordeaux	11	10,130	4,192	375	920
Paris FC	11	8,848	3,417	138	804
Lille	11	7,773	2,365	219	706
Soyaux	11	5,302	1,267	241	482
Metz	11	4,914	1,955	108	446
Guingamp	11	4,904	777	274	445
Rodez	11	4,796	1,156	232	436
Montpellier	11	3,486	1,291	92	316
Fleury	11	3,459	775	144	314
Total	132	121,458	25,907	92	920

=== Highest attendances ===
Regular season

Rank	Home team	Score	Away team	Attendance	Date	Stadium	Ref
1	Lyon	5–0	Paris Saint-Germain	25,907	13 April 2019	Parc Olympique Lyonnais	
2	Paris Saint-Germain	1–1	Lyon	8,704	18 November 2018	Stade Jean-Bouin	
3	Bordeaux	0–2	Paris Saint-Germain	4,192	4 November 2018	Nouveau Stade de Bordeaux	
4	Dijon	0–4	Lyon	4,164	24 April 2019	Stade Gaston Gérard	
5	Paris FC	0–1	Montpellier	3,417	24 April 2019	Stade Sébastien Charléty	

== Season statistics ==
=== Top scorers ===
Rank	Player	Club	Goals
1	(France) Marie-Antoinette Katoto	Paris Saint-Germain	22
2	(Norway) Ada Hegerberg	Lyon	20
3	(France) Kadidiatou Diani	Paris Saint-Germain	13
3	(France) Clarisse Le Bihan	Montpellier	13
3	(France) Eugénie Le Sommer	Lyon	13
6	(France) Viviane Asseyi	Bordeaux	12
6	(Finland) Linda Sällström	Paris FC	12
8	(France) Amel Majri	Lyon	10
8	(Germany) Dzsenifer Marozsán	Lyon	10
10	(Belgium) Janice Cayman	Montpellier	8
10	(France) Léa Khelifi	Metz	8
10	(France) Wendie Renard	Lyon	8
10	(France) Gaëtane Thiney	Paris FC	8

=== Hat-tricks ===
Player	Club	Against	Result	Date
(France) Ouleymata Sarr	Lille	Rodez	3–2 (A)	8 September 2018
(France) Kenza Dali	Dijon	Metz	3–0 (H)	15 September 2018
(France) Eugénie Le Sommer	Lyon	Guingamp	3–0 (A)	16 September 2018
(Norway) Ada Hegerberg	Lyon	Paris FC	5–0 (A)	22 September 2018
(France) Marie-Antoinette Katoto	Paris Saint-Germain	Metz	3–1 (A)	13 October 2018
(Sweden) Stina Blackstenius^{5}	Montpellier	Metz	11–0 (H)	20 October 2018
(France) Clarisse Le Bihan	Montpellier	Rodez	5–0 (H)	17 November 2018
(France) Viviane Asseyi	Bordeaux	Rodez	4–1 (A)	1 December 2018
(France) Marie-Antoinette Katoto	Paris Saint-Germain	Metz	7–1 (H)	16 December 2018
(France) Marie-Antoinette Katoto^{4}	Paris Saint-Germain	Bordeaux	6–2 (H)	24 April 2019

- ^{4} Player scored four goals.
- ^{5} Player scored five goals.
