= 2024–25 Division 3 Féminine =

10th season of third-tier French women's football league

Division 3 Féminine
- Season: 2024–25
- Matches: 190
- Goals: 626 (3.29 per match)
- Top goalscorer: Nguenar Ndiaye (19 goals)
- Biggest home win: Lyon B 8–1 Colomiers (13 October 2024)
- Biggest away win: Brest 1–6 Roubaix-Wervicq (10 November 2024); Colomiers 1–6 Montpellier B (17 December 2024) (10 November 2024); Nîmes 1–6 Grenoble (8 December 2024)
- Highest scoring: Lyon B 8–1 Colomiers (13 October 2024)
- All statistics correct as of 2 April 2025.

The 2024–25 Division 3 Féminine season, shortly known as D3, was the 10th season of the third-tier national women's football league in France and the second season since its reintroduction in its revamped format.

The season began on 15 September 2024 and ended on 25 May 2025.

== Teams ==
Listed below are the 24 teams who competed in the 2024–25 season:

=== Group A ===
Team	Manager	Home ground	Capacity
AAS Sarcelles	Edmilson Cruman	Complexe Sportif Nelson Mandela 3, Sarcelles	1,000
AJ Auxerre	Jean-Daniel Songné	Stade Pierre-Bouillot, Auxerre	3,000
ALC Longvic	Antoine Michel	Stade Municipal Maurice Colson, Longvic	1,500
Bourges FC	Sandrine Jacquet	Stade Jacques Rimbault, Bourges	13,000
CPB Bréquigny Rennes	Vincent Garel	Complexe Sportif De Bréquigny 4, Rennes	1,000
Croix Blanche Angers	Valentin Rey	Stade de l'Arceau, Angers	2,000
ESOF La Roche-sur-Yon	Anthony Gauvin	Stade de Saint-André-d'Ornay, La Roche-sur-Yon	1,800
Quevilly RM	Youcef Chekkal	Stade Amable Lozai, Le Petit-Quevilly	2,300
RC Roubaix Wervicq	Samuel Delcroix	Stade Maillard, Roubaix	3,000
Saint-Denis RC	Wadii Fadly	Stade Auguste Delaune, Saint-Denis	4,500
SM Caen	Chloé Charlot	Stade de Venoix, Caen	16,000
Stade Brestois 29	Gaëtan Abejean	Complexe Sportif Cavale Blanche Terrain 1, Brest	1,000

=== Group B ===
Team	Manager	Home ground	Capacity
Albi Marssac TF	Alain Bénédet	Stade Maurice Rigaud, Albi	3,000
AS Cannes	Steven Paulle	Stade Maurice Chevalier, Cannes	3,000
AS Monaco FF	Fabrice Poullain	Stade Prince Héréditaire Jacques, Beausoleil	1,000
Chassieu-Décines FC	Éric Delétang	Stade Raymond Troussier, Décines-Charpieu	2,000
Clermont Foot 63	Quentin Vaillant	Stade Gabriel Montpied 2, Clermont-Ferrand	1,500
Grenoble Foot 38	Nasreddine Behloul	Stade Stijovic N°1, Grenoble	1,000
Le Puy Foot 43 Auvergne	Pierre-Yves Thomas	Stade Charles Massot, Espaly-Saint-Marcel	4,800
Montauban FC TG	Samuel Riscagli	Complexe Sportif Jean Verbeke, Montauban	1,000
Montpellier HSC B	Geoffrey Doumeng	Stade Bernard Gasset Terrain n°2, Montpellier	1,000
Nîmes Métropole Gard	(Niger) Olivier Bonnes	Stade Jean Bouin, Nîmes	1,000
Olympique Lyonnais B	Julien Perney	Groupama OL Academy Meyzieu, Meyzieu	1,500
US Colomiers	Guillaume Balagué	Complexe Sportif Capitany 1, Colomiers	2,000

=== Team changes ===
Entering league		Exiting league	
Promoted from 2023–24 Régional 1	Relegated from 2023–24 Division 2	Promoted to 2024–25 Seconde Ligue	Relegated to 2024–25 Régional 1
Quevilly Rouen; Sarcelles; Auxerre; Chassieu-Décines; Monaco; Montpellier HSC B	Albi Marssac; Montauban	Saint-Malo; Toulouse	Châtellerault; Troyes; Paris CA; Lattes; Valence; Arlac Mérignac

== Season ==
=== Standings ===
==== Group A ====
Pos	Team	Pld	W	D	L	GF	GA	GD	Pts	Qualification or relegation
1	Auxerre (C)	22	17	3	2	56	12	+44	54	Promotion to 2025–26 Seconde Ligue
2	Bourges	22	14	5	3	50	24	+26	47 (Note: Bourges FC finished ahead of RC Roubaix-Wervicq on head-to-head points: Bourges 6, Roubaix-Wervicq 0; Bourges 3–1 Roubaix-Wervicq, Roubaix-Wervicq 0–1 Bourges.)	
3	Roubaix-Wervicq	22	14	5	3	58	21	+37	47	
4	La Roche-sur-Yon	22	10	7	5	48	23	+25	37	
5	Sarcelles	22	10	1	11	36	36	0	31	
6	Rennes Bréquigny	22	9	3	10	36	32	+4	30	
7	Quevilly Rouen	22	9	1	12	43	39	+4	28	
8	Saint-Denis	22	7	4	11	29	38	−9	25	
9	Caen	22	6	5	11	28	33	−5	23	
10	Brest	22	7	2	13	26	48	−22	23	Relegation to 2025–26 Régional 1 Féminine
11	Longvic	22	6	3	13	19	49	−30	21	Relegation to 2025–26 Régional 1 Féminine
12	Angers	22	2	3	17	18	92	−74	9	Relegation to 2025–26 Régional 1 Féminine

Source: FFF.fr
Rules for classification: 1) points; 2) goal difference; 3) goals scored; 4) head-to-head points; 5) head-to-head goal difference
(C) Champions

==== Group B ====
Pos	Team	Pld	W	D	L	GF	GA	GD	Pts	Qualification or relegation
1	Grenoble	22	16	4	2	45	14	+31	52	Promotion to 2025–26 Seconde Ligue
2	Clermont	22	14	3	5	52	29	+23	45	
3	Albi Marssac	22	12	7	3	52	25	+27	43	
4	Lyon B	22	10	6	6	51	29	+22	36	
5	AS Cannes	22	11	2	9	36	26	+10	35	
6	Le Puy	22	9	4	9	38	39	−1	31	
7	Monaco	22	8	3	11	26	36	−10	27	
8	Montpellier B	22	7	5	10	31	37	−6	26	
9	Montauban	22	6	7	9	31	37	−6	25	
10	Chassieu-Décines (Note: On 30 October 2024, the Regulations and Disciplinary Committee ruled to amend the result of the September 15 match between Chassieu-Décines and Nîmes, which had ended 5–0 in favor of Chassieu-Décines. Chassieu-Décines was penalized with a 3–0 forfeit loss and a one-point deduction for fielding a suspended player.)	22	6	4	12	24	38	−14	21	Relegation to 2025–26 Régional 1 Féminine
11	Colomiers	22	5	2	15	27	57	−30	17	Relegation to 2025–26 Régional 1 Féminine
12	Nîmes	22	4	1	17	26	72	−46	13	Relegation to 2025–26 Régional 1 Féminine

Source: FFF.fr
Rules for classification: 1) points; 2) goal difference; 3) goals scored; 4) head-to-head points; 5) head-to-head goal difference

=== Results ===
==== Group A ====
Home \ Away	AUX	BOU	ROU	LRY	SAR	REN	QUE	SDE	CAE	BRE	LON	ANG
Auxerre	—	1–1	1–1	0–0	3–0	1–0	2–0	3–0	1–0	1–0	4–0	12–0
Bourges	4–5	—	3–1	4–4	3–1	3–2	2–0	1–0	2–1	3–1	5–0	2–0
Roubaix-Wervicq	2–1	0–1	—	3–2	3–2	2–1	4–0	1–2	1–0	5–1	4–0	3–0
La Roche-sur-Yon	0–2	1–1	2–2	—	3–0	3–0	2–1	4–2	0–0	2–0	1–0	0–0
Sarcelles	1–0	1–3	0–0	0–4	—	4–1	2–0	3–0	3–1	5–0	2–3	3–1
Rennes Bréquigny	0–1	0–2	0–0	2–1	3–2	—	3–1	3–5	1–0	2–0	3–0	4–0
Quevilly Rouen	0–1	0–4	0–1	4–1	2–0	2–2	—	4–0	0–1	3–2	3–0	10–0
Saint-Denis	0–2	0–2	2–2	0–0	1–0	0–0	3–4	—	1–3	3–1	0–0	4–1
Caen	1–3	1–1	1–4	0–2	1–2	3–0	3–5	2–1	—	0–0	1–1	4–1
Brest	1–3	2–1	1–6	2–1	3–0	0–1	2–1	2–1	0–2	—	4–1	2–2
Longvic	0–5	1–1	1–2	0–4	0–3	2–1	2–0	0–2	2–1	1–2	—	2–0
Angers	1–4	2–1	0–11	0–11	1–2	0–7	2–3	0–2	2–2	4–0	1–3	—

Source: FFF.fr
Legend: Blue = home team win; Yellow = draw; Red = away team win.

==== Group B ====
Home \ Away	GRE	CLE	ALB	LYB	CAN	LPU	MON	MPB	MOU	CHD	COL	NIM
Grenoble	—	2–1	2–1	1–1	1–0	6–1	4–0	1–1	4–2	0–0	1–1	2–0
Clermont	1–2	—	3–3	1–1	4–0	4–1	5–0	1–3	3–1	4–3	3–1	3–0
Albi Marssac	3–2	1–1	—	1–0	0–0	2–1	1–1	3–0	3–1	5–1	3–0	7–1
Lyon B	0–1	1–2	4–2	—	2–0	2–2	1–2	2–0	2–2	2–0	8–1	3–4
Cannes AS	1–0	2–0	1–1	1–3	—	0–1	2–0	5–1	3–0	1–3	3–0	5–0
Le Puy	0–1	1–2	0–3	2–3	2–3	—	3–2	2–2	1–1	2–0	3–1	6–1
Monaco	0–4	0–1	1–3	2–2	2–0	2–0	—	1–1	0–2	2–0	3–0	3–0
Montpellier B	0–1	0–3	0–3	1–0	2–1	2–3	0–1	—	2–2	4–1	1–4	1–0
Montauban	0–1	1–3	1–1	0–5	0–2	1–2	3–0	0–0	—	2–1	4–2	1–1
Chassieu-Décines	0–1	1–0	2–2	1–1	2–0	1–2	0–3	1–0	1–1	—	0–1	5–2
Colomiers	0–2	1–2	3–1	2–5	2–3	0–0	1–0	1–6	0–4	0–1	—	2–3
Nîmes	1–6	4–5	0–3	1–3	0–3	0–3	3–1	1–4	0–2	3–0	1–4	—

Source: FFF.fr
Legend: Blue = home team win; Yellow = draw; Red = away team win.

== Season statistics ==
=== Top scorers ===
As of 30 March 2025

Group A
Rank	Player	Club	Goals
1	(Senegal) Nguenar Ndiaye	Bourges	19
2	(Cameroon) Chanel Tchaptchet	Roubaix-Wervicq	15
3	(France) Yama Lelo	La Roche-sur-Yon	13
4	(Algeria) Shana Battouri	Saint-Denis	11
5	(Senegal) Korka Fall	Caen	10
6	(France) Laury Aznar	Sarcelles	9
7	(France) Jade Miriel	Rennes Bréquigny	8
7	(France) Elsa Mosse	Roubaix-Wervicq	8
9	(France) Adama Ly	Sarcelles	7
9	(Democratic Republic of the Congo) Gloria Mabomba	Auxerre	7
9	(France) Chloé Tirilly	Auxerre	7

Group B
Rank	Player	Club	Goals
1	(Algeria) Lynda Bendris	AS Cannes	16
1	(France) Julie Micard	Clermont	16
3	(France) Inès Belmiliani	Montpellier B	10
4	(France) Sofia Bekhaled	Lyon B	9
5	(France) Cyrine Ben Rabah	Le Puy	8
5	(France) Abigail Charpentier	Lyon B	8
5	(France) Agathe Daviaud	Colomiers	8
8	(France) Kimberley Cazeau	Albi Marssac	7
8	(France) Fannie Da Cunha	Albi Marssac	7
8	(France) Léa Malaret	Monaco	7

=== Most clean sheets ===
As of 19 January 2025

Group A
Rank	Player	Club	Clean sheets
1	(France) Anaïs Elie	Roubaix-Wervicq	6
2	(France) Anouck Laisney	La Roche-sur-Yon	5
2	(France) Marie Percebois	Auxerre	5
4	(France) Tiffanie Geslin	Rennes Bréquigny	4
4	(France) Nelly Maignan	Sarcelles	4
6	(France) Camille André	Longvic	2
6	(Martinique) Emmeline Mainguy	Caen	2
6	(France) Léna Michaud	Angers	2
9	(France) Mathilde Bonneau	Bourges	1
9	(France) Natacha Hubert	Bourges	1
9	(France) Aïssatou Liberge	La Roche-sur-Yon	1
9	(France) Vanessa Maret	Saint-Denis	1
9	(Canada) Stephania Turyk	Caen	1

Group B
Rank	Player	Club	Clean sheets
1	(France) Julie Tissino	Grenoble	4
2	(Democratic Republic of the Congo) Océane Basil	Monaco	3
2	(France) Flavie Caillet	Clermont	3
2	(France) Manon Toti	Montauban	3
2	(France) Loïs Ursella	Chassieu-Décines	3
6	(France) Olesya Arsenieva	Cannes AS	2
6	(France) Solène Froger	Albi Marssac	2
6	(France) Coralie Houamria	Montpellier B	2
6	(France) Lou Marchal	Lyon B	2
10	(Switzerland) Yasmine Ammar	Lyon B	1
10	(Tunisia) Manelle Ben Mohamed	Cannes AS	1
10	(Morocco) Inès Souifi	Colomiers	1

=== Hat-tricks ===
Group A
Player	Club	Against	Result	Date
(France) Chloé Tirilly	Auxerre	Sarcelles	3–0 (H)	22 September 2024
(France) Angèle Piat	Angers	Brest	4–0 (H)	22 September 2024
(Senegal) Nguenar Ndiaye	Bourges	Auxerre	4–5 (H)	29 September 2024
(Cameroon) Chanel Tchaptchet	Roubaix-Wervicq	Brest	6–1 (A)	10 November 2024
(France) Laury Aznar^{4}	Sarcelles	Brest	5–0 (H)	17 November 2024

Group B
Player	Club	Against	Result	Date
(France) Justine Billon	Chassieu-Décines	Nîmes	5–0 (A)	15 September 2024
(Algeria) Lynda Bendris^{5}	Cannes AS	Nîmes	5–0 (H)	6 October 2024
(France) Abigail Charpentier	Lyon B	Colomiers	8–1 (H)	13 October 2024
(France) Sofia Bekhaled	Lyon B	Colomiers	8–1 (H)	13 October 2024
(France) Julie Micard	Clermont	AS Cannes^{[4]}	4–0 (H)	13 October 2024
(France) Julie Micard	Clermont	Le Puy	4–1 (H)	19 January 2025
(France) Kimberley Cazeau	Albi Marssac	Montpellier B	3–0 (A)	10 November 2024
(France) Adeline Coquard	Le Puy	Nîmes	6–1 (H)	22 December 2024

- ^{4} Player scored four goals
- ^{5} Player scored five goals

== See also ==
- 2024–25 Coupe de France féminine
- 2024–25 Seconde Ligue
