= 2017–18 Division 1 Féminine =

Division 1 Féminine
- Season: 2017–18
- Champions: Lyon (12th title)
- Relegated: Albi; Marseille
- Champions League: Lyon; Paris Saint-Germain
- Matches: 132
- Goals: 407 (3.08 per match)
- Top goalscorer: Ada Hegerberg (31 goals)
- Biggest home win: Montpellier 8–0 Fleury
- Biggest away win: Lille 1–10 Lyon
- Highest scoring: Lille 1–10 Lyon; Lyon 9–2 Paris FC

The 2017–18 Division 1 Féminine season was the 44th edition since its establishment. Lyon were the defending champions, having won the title in each of the past eleven seasons. The season began on 3 September 2017 and ended on 27 May 2018. Lyon won their twelfth straight title.

== Teams ==
Location of teams in 2017–18 Division 1 Féminine
Locations of teams in the 2025–26 Championnat National from Île-de-France

FCF Juvisy changed its name to Paris FC. Two teams were promoted from the Division 2 Féminine, the second level of women's football in France, to replace two teams that were relegated from the Division 1 Féminine following the 2016–17 season. A total of 12 teams currently compete in the league; two clubs will be relegated to the second division at the end of the season.

Teams promoted to 2017–18 Division 1 Féminine

- Lille
- Fleury

Teams relegated to 2017–18 Division 2 Féminine

- Saint-Étienne
- Metz

=== Stadia and locations ===
Club	Location	Venue	Capacity
ASPTT Albi	Albi	Stade Maurice-Rigaud	3,000
Bordeaux	Bordeaux	Stade Sainte-Germaine (Le Bouscat)	7,000
Guingamp	Guingamp	Stade Fred-Aubert (Saint-Brieuc)	10,600
Fleury	Fleury-Mérogis	Stade Auguste Gentelet	2,000
Paris FC	Viry-Châtillon	Stade Robert-Bobin (Bondoufle)	18,850
Montpellier	Montpellier	Stade de la Mosson	32,900
Lille	Lille	Stade Pierre-Mauroy	50,157
Lyon	Lyon	Parc Olympique Lyonnais (Décines-Charpieu)	59,186
Marseille	Marseille	Stade Parsemain (Fos-sur-Mer)	17,000
Paris Saint-Germain	Paris	Stade Sébastien Charléty	20,000
Rodez	Rodez	Stade Paul-Lignon	5,955
Soyaux	Soyaux	Stade Camille-Lebon (Angoulême)	6,500

== League standings ==
=== League table ===
Pos	Team	Pld	W	D	L	GF	GA	GD	Pts	Qualification or relegation
1	Lyon (C)	22	21	1	0	104	5	+99	64	Qualification for the Champions League Round of 32
2	Paris Saint-Germain	22	18	2	2	59	13	+46	56	Qualification for the Champions League Round of 32
3	Montpellier	22	17	2	3	63	22	+41	53	
4	Paris FC	22	8	6	8	31	37	−6	30	
5	Soyaux	22	6	6	10	18	36	−18	24	
6	Lille	22	6	5	11	24	47	−23	23	
7	Bordeaux	22	5	7	10	19	33	−14	22	
8	Fleury	22	6	4	12	22	45	−23	22	
9	Rodez	22	5	7	10	22	52	−30	22	
10	Guingamp	22	6	4	12	17	33	−16	22	
11	Albi (R)	22	5	5	12	12	37	−25	20	Relegation to Division 2 Féminine
12	Marseille (R)	22	3	3	16	16	47	−31	12	Relegation to Division 2 Féminine

Source: Soccerway FFF
Rules for classification: 1) points; 2) head-to-head; 3) head-to-head goal difference; 4) goal difference; 5) goals scored
(C) Champions; (R) Relegated

=== Positions by round ===
Team ╲ Week	1	2	3	4	5	6	7	8	9	10	11	12	13	14	15	16	17	18	19	20	21	22
Lyon	1	2	1	1	1	1	1	1	1	1	1	1	1	1	1	1	1	1	1	1	1	1
Paris Saint-Germain	5	4	3	2	2	2	2	2	2	2	2	2	2	2	2	2	2	3	2	2	2	2
Montpellier	2	1	2	4	3	3	3	3	3	3	3	3	3	3	3	3	3	2	3	3	3	3
Paris FC	3	3	6	5	5	5	6	4	4	4	4	4	4	4	4	4	4	4	4	4	4	4
Soyaux	6	5	4	3	4	4	5	6	6	6	6	6	6	6	6	7	6	6	6	6	5	5
Lille	4	6	7	7	7	7	7	7	8	9	11	7	9	10	8	6	7	9	7	7	10	6
Bordeaux	9	7	5	6	6	6	4	5	5	5	5	5	5	5	5	5	5	5	5	5	6	7
Fleury	10	12	12	12	12	12	12	11	11	11	9	10	10	8	9	9	10	8	9	11	8	8
Rodez	12	11	10	11	11	11	11	10	10	10	8	9	11	11	11	11	11	11	11	10	7	9
Guingamp	7	9	8	8	8	10	10	9	7	8	10	11	8	9	7	10	9	7	8	9	11	10
Albi	11	10	11	10	10	8	8	8	9	7	7	8	7	7	10	8	8	10	10	8	9	11
Marseille	8	8	9	9	9	9	9	12	12	12	12	12	12	12	12	12	12	12	12	12	12	12

Leader and Champions League Round of 32
Champions League Round of 32
Relegation to Division 2 Féminine

== Results ==
Home \ Away	ALB	BOR	FLE	GUI	LSC	LYO	MAR	MON	PAR	PSG	ROD	SOY
Albi		0–1	1–0	2–0	0–0	0–5	0–2	0–7	0–1	0–4	1–1	0–1
Bordeaux	3–1		3–3	1–1	1–2	0–4	1–0	0–0	2–3	0–1	1–1	0–0
Fleury	0–1	0–1		1–0	1–2	1–3	2–1	1–1	1–5	0–2	2–0	1–0
Guingamp	0–1	0–1	1–2		1–0	0–5	1–0	1–3	2–2	0–3	3–1	1–0
Lille	1–1	3–0	2–2	1–0		1–10	1–1	0–2	1–1	1–3	0–2	2–0
Lyon	4–0	2–0	5–0	4–0	6–0		7–0	2–1	9–2	1–0	7–0	5–0
Marseille	1–2	1–0	0–1	0–0	0–2	0–5		1–4	1–0	2–5	0–1	0–0
Montpellier	3–1	4–1	8–0	1–0	4–1	0–5	3–2		2–1	3–0	2–1	1–0
Paris FC	1–0	1–1	0–0	1–3	2–1	0–4	2–1	1–2		0–1	4–0	2–1
Paris Saint-Germain	1–0	3–0	4–2	2–0	6–1	0–0	4–0	3–1	4–1		6–0	1–1
Rodez	0–0	2–2	3–1	1–1	2–1	0–6	4–2	0–6	0–0	0–3		1–1
Soyaux	1–1	1–0	2–1	1–2	2–1	0–5	2–1	1–5	1–1	0–3	3–2	

Source: footofeminin.fr (in French)
Legend: Blue = home team win; Yellow = draw; Red = away team win.

== Season statistics ==
=== Top scorers ===
Rank	Player	Club	Goals
1	(Norway) Ada Hegerberg	Lyon	31
2	(France) Marie-Antoinette Katoto	Paris Saint-Germain	21
3	(France) Eugénie Le Sommer	Lyon	17
4	(Sweden) Stina Blackstenius	Montpellier	13
5	(France) Valérie Gauvin	Montpellier	12
6	(France) Gaëtane Thiney	Paris FC	11
7	(France) Marie-Laure Delie	Paris Saint-Germain	10
8	(France) Camille Abily	Lyon	9
8	(France) Ouleymata Sarr	Lille	9
10	(France) Flavie Lemaître	Rodez	8
10	(Germany) Dzsenifer Marozsán	Lyon	8
