= 2026–27 Première Ligue =

53rd season of top French women's football league

Première Ligue
- Season: 2026–27
- Dates: 4 September 2026 – 5 June 2027
- Matches: 59
- Goals: 197 (3.34 per match)
- Top goalscorer: Melchie Dumornay; Ada Hegerberg (11 goals each)
- Biggest home win: Fleury 7–0 Toulouse (11 November 2026)
- Biggest away win: Le Havre 1–8 Lyon (18 September 2026)
- Highest scoring: Le Havre 1–8 Lyon (18 September 2026)
- Longest winning run: Lyon (10 matches)
- Longest unbeaten run: Lyon (10 matches)
- Longest winless run: Lens (10 matches)
- Longest losing run: Saint-Malo (7 matches)
- Highest attendance: 13,627; Paris Saint-Germain 0–4 Lyon (17 October 2026)
- Lowest attendance: 128; Fleury 7–0 Toulouse (11 November 2026)
- Total attendance: 92,865 (after 53 matches)
- Average attendance: 1,752 (after 53 matches)
- All statistics correct as of 22 November 2026.

The 2026–27 Première Ligue season, also known as Arkema Première Ligue for sponsorship reasons, is the 53rd season of top national women's football league in France and the third season since its rebranding as Première Ligue. Lyon are the defending champions, having won their record-extending 19th title in the 2025–26 season.

The season began on 4 September 2026 and is scheduled to end on 5 June 2027 with the play-off final.

== Teams ==
Location of teams in the 2026–27 Première Ligue

Team	Home city	Home ground	2025–26 season
Fleury	Fleury-Mérogis	Essonne Stadium	5th
Le Havre	Le Havre	Stade Océane	8th
Lens	Lens	Stade François-Blin	11th (Repechage (Note: Following serious financial difficulties and after finishing sixth in the 2025–26 Première Ligue, Dijon was excluded from national competitions by the DNCG due to insufficient financial guarantees for the 2026–27 season. The club did not appeal this decision and was replaced by Lens, who finished eleventh in the 2025–26 Première Ligue, and the first team that could have benefited from a 2026–27 Première Ligue repechage.))
Lyon	Lyon	Parc Olympique Lyonnais	1st
Marseille	Marseille	Stade Francis-Turcan	9th
Montpellier	Montpellier	Bernard Gasset Training Centre	10th
Nantes	Nantes	Stade Marcel-Saupin	4th
Paris FC	Paris	Stade Sébastien-Charléty	2nd
Paris Saint-Germain	Paris	Campus PSG; Parc des Princes	3rd
Saint-Malo	Saint-Malo	Stade de Marville 1	Seconde Ligue, 2nd ▲
Strasbourg	Strasbourg	Stade de la Meinau	7th
Toulouse	Toulouse	Parc des Sports Stadium A1	Seconde Ligue, 1st ▲

=== Team changes ===
Entering league	Exiting league
Promoted from 2025–26 Seconde Ligue	Relegated from 2025–26 Première Ligue
Toulouse; Saint-Malo	Saint-Étienne; Dijon

== Regular season ==
=== Standings ===
Pos	Team	Pld	W	D	L	GF	GA	GD	Pts	Qualification or relegation
1	Lyon	10	10	0	0	54	8	+46	30	Qualification for the play-offs
2	Paris Saint-Germain	10	8	1	1	17	6	+11	25	Qualification for the play-offs
3	Paris FC	9	7	1	1	23	11	+12	22	Qualification for the play-offs
4	Marseille	10	4	4	2	12	15	−3	16	Qualification for the play-offs
5	Nantes	10	4	3	3	14	11	+3	15	
6	Fleury	10	4	3	3	19	17	+2	15	
7	Strasbourg	10	3	2	5	17	21	−4	11	
8	Montpellier	10	2	3	5	10	16	−6	9	
9	Le Havre	10	2	3	5	9	21	−12	9	
10	Toulouse	10	1	3	6	10	31	−21	6	
11	Saint-Malo	9	1	0	8	5	16	−11	3	Relegation to the Seconde Ligue
12	Lens	10	0	3	7	7	24	−17	3	Relegation to the Seconde Ligue

Updated to match(es) played on 22 November 2026. Source: FFF.fr
Rules for classification: 1) points; 2) head-to-head points; 3) head-to-head goal difference; 4) goal difference; 5) goals scored

=== Results ===
Home \ Away	FLE	LHV	LEN	LYO	MAR	MON	NAN	PFC	PSG	SML	STR	TOU
Fleury	—			1–7					1–3		2–1	7–0
Le Havre		—	0–0	1–8			2–4	1–2		2–0		
Lens	1–1		—	1–7		0–1			0–2		1–3	2–2
Lyon				—	5–0			7–1		1–0	5–2	5–0
Marseille	2–2	1–0	2–1		—		1–0		0–2			
Montpellier	0–1	1–1		2–5	0–0	—						5–1
Nantes	1–1		2–0			1–1	—				3–2	1–1
Paris FC	2–1		4–1			5–0	2–0	—	1–1			
Paris Saint-Germain		4–0		0–4		1–0	1–0		—	1–0	2–0	
Saint-Malo	0–2				1–2	1–0	0–2			—		
Strasbourg		0–0			3–3			0–2		3–2	—	3–1
Toulouse		1–2			1–1			0–4		3–1		—

Updated to match(es) played on 22 November 2026. Source: FFF.fr
Legend: Blue = home team win; Yellow = draw; Red = away team win.

== Play-offs ==
The top four teams from the regular season qualify for the play-offs. In the semi-finals, the team that finished first plays the team which finished fourth. Rest of the two teams would face each other.

== Statistics ==
=== Top scorers ===
As of 22 November 2026

Rank	Player	Club	Goals
1	(Haiti) Melchie Dumornay	Lyon	11
1	(Norway) Ada Hegerberg	Lyon	11
3	(France) Marie-Antoinette Katoto	Lyon	8
4	(Turkey) Selen Altunkulak	Toulouse	5
4	(France) Lucie Calba	Fleury	5
6	(France) Shana Chossenotte	Fleury	4
6	(France) Thaïs Gallais	Le Havre	4
6	(France) Clara Mateo	Paris FC	4
6	(France) Madeline Roth	Nantes	4
10	11 players		3

==== Hat-tricks ====
Player	Club	Against	Result	Date
(Haiti) Melchie Dumornay	Lyon	Fleury	7–1 (A)	4 September 2026
(Norway) Ada Hegerberg	Lyon	Paris FC	7–1 (H)	12 September 2026
(China) Wu Chengshu	Nantes	Le Havre	2–4 (A)	21 November 2026

(H) – Home; (A) – Away

=== Most clean sheets ===
As of 22 November 2026

Rank	Player	Club	Clean sheets
1	(Poland) Katarzyna Kiedrzynek	Paris Saint-Germain	4
2	(Canada) Emily Burns	Marseille	3
2	(Chile) Christiane Endler	Lyon	3
2	(France) Marie Petiteau	Le Havre	3
2	(Finland) Katriina Talaslahti	Fleury	3
6	(France) Mylène Chavas	Paris FC	2
6	(France) Solène Durand	Montpellier	2
6	(Poland) Natalia Radkiewicz	Nantes	2
6	(Poland) Kinga Seweryn	Paris FC	2
6	(Poland) Oliwia Szperkowska	Paris Saint-Germain	2

== Awards ==
=== Player of the Month ===
Month	Winner	Club	Ref.
September 2026	(Haiti) Melchie Dumornay	Lyon	
October 2026	(Haiti) Melchie Dumornay	Lyon	

== See also ==
- 2026–27 Seconde Ligue
- 2026–27 Coupe LFFP
