= 2016–17 Division 1 Féminine =

Division 1 Féminine
- Season: 2016–17
- Champions: Lyon (11th title)
- Relegated: Metz; Saint-Étienne
- Champions League: Lyon; Montpellier
- Matches: 120
- Goals: 388 (3.23 per match)
- Top goalscorer: Eugénie Le Sommer (19 goals)
- Biggest home win: Lyon 9–0; Soyaux
- Biggest away win: Rodez 0–10; Juvisy
- Highest scoring: Lyon 9–1; Guingamp; Rodez 0–10; Juvisy

The 2016–17 Division 1 Féminine season was the 43rd edition since its establishment. Lyon were the defending champions, having won the title in each of the past ten seasons. The season began on 11 September 2016.

Lyon finished in first place, making it their eleventh straight title.

== Teams ==
Location of teams in 2016–17 Division 1 Féminine

There were three promoted teams from the Division 2 Féminine, the second level of women's football in France, replacing the three teams that were relegated from the Division 1 Féminine following the 2015–16 season. A total of 12 teams competed in the league with two clubs suffering relegation to the second division at the end of the season.

Teams promoted to 2016–17 Division 1 Féminine

- Bordeaux
- Marseille
- Metz

Teams relegated to 2016–17 Division 2 Féminine

- La Roche-sur-Yon
- Nîmes MG
- Saint-Maur

=== Stadia and locations ===
Club	Location	Venue	Capacity
Albi	Albi	Stade Maurice-Rigaud	3,000
Bordeaux	Bordeaux	Stade Sainte-Germaine (Le Bouscat)	7,000
Guingamp	Guingamp	Stade Fred-Aubert (Saint-Brieuc)	10,600
Juvisy	Viry-Châtillon	Stade Robert-Bobin (Bondoufle)	18,850
Metz	Metz	Stade Saint-Symphorien	25,636
Montpellier HSC	Montpellier	Stade de la Mosson	32,900
Lyon	Lyon	Parc Olympique Lyonnais (Décines-Charpieu)	59,186
Marseille	Marseille	Stade Parsemain (Fos-sur-Mer)	17,000
Paris Saint-Germain	Paris	Stade Sébastien Charléty	20,000
Rodez	Rodez	Stade Paul-Lignon	5,955
Saint-Étienne	Saint-Étienne	Stade Léon Nautin	1,500
Soyaux	Soyaux	Stade Camille-Lebon (Angoulême)	6,500

== League table ==
Pos	Team	Pld	W	D	L	GF	GA	GD	Pts	Qualification or relegation
1	Lyon (C)	22	21	0	1	103	6	+97	63	Qualification for the Champions League Round of 32
2	Montpellier	22	18	1	3	73	10	+63	55	Qualification for the Champions League Round of 32
3	Paris Saint-Germain	22	16	2	4	54	16	+38	49 (Note: Paris Saint-Germain were deducted 1 point.)	
4	Marseille	22	11	2	9	32	38	−6	35	
5	Juvisy	22	9	5	8	42	25	+17	32	
6	Guingamp	22	8	5	9	28	36	−8	29	
7	Soyaux	22	7	6	9	25	52	−27	27	
8	Rodez	22	5	6	11	22	56	−34	21	
9	Albi	22	6	1	15	14	49	−35	19	
10	Bordeaux	22	3	7	12	14	43	−29	16	
11	Saint-Étienne (R)	22	3	6	13	18	48	−30	15	Relegation to Division 2 Féminine
12	Metz (R)	22	3	3	16	13	59	−46	12	Relegation to Division 2 Féminine

Source: Soccerway FFF
Rules for classification: 1) points; 2) goal difference; 3) goals scored
(C) Champions; (R) Relegated

== Results ==
Home \ Away	ALB	BOR	GUI	JUV	LYO	MAR	MET	MON	PSG	ROD	SET	SOY
Albi		0–1	0–2	0–3	0–5	0–1	1–0	0–1	3–0	1–3	0–0	1–4
Bordeaux	1–2		0–1	1–1	0–1	1–1	1–2	1–2	0–6	0–2	0–7	2–3
Guingamp	1–2	2–2		1–0	0–3	4–0	6–2	0–2	0–4	1–0	0–0	0–0
Juvisy	3–0	0–0	2–1		0–1	2–1	6–0	1–2	1–2	1–1	3–0	2–1
Lyon	6–0	8–0	9–1	5–2		4–0	3–0	2–1	3–0	8–0	6–0	9–0
Marseille	3–1	0–1	2–0	2–1	1–6		3–0	0–5	2–0	3–1	3–1	2–0
Metz	0–1	0–1	1–1	1–3	0–3	1–3		0–5	0–2	0–4	0–3	1–1
Montpellier	7–0	1–0	3–0	0–0	0–3	5–0	6–0		2–1	4–1	3–0	10–0
Paris Saint-Germain	4–0	2–2	3–3	3–0	1–0	1–0	3–0	1–0		4–0	4–0	2–0
Rodez	1–0	0–0	0–3	0–10	0–5	2–2	1–2	0–4	0–3		1–1	1–1
Saint-Étienne	0–1	0–0	0–1	2–0	0–4	0–2	1–2	0–8	0–6	1–1		2–2
Soyaux	3–1	2–0	1–0	1–1	0–9	2–1	1–1	0–2	0–2	2–3	1–0	

Source: statsfootofeminin.fr (in French)
Legend: Blue = home team win; Yellow = draw; Red = away team win.

== Season statistics ==
=== Top scorers ===
Rank	Player	Club	Goals
1	(France) Eugénie Le Sommer	Lyon	20
1	(Norway) Ada Hegerberg	Lyon	20
3	(France) Marie-Laure Delie	Paris Saint-Germain	16
4	(Sweden) Sofia Jakobsson	Montpellier	14
5	(France) Lindsey Thomas	Montpellier	12
6	(Brazil) Cristiane	Paris Saint-Germain	11
7	(France) Camille Abily	Lyon	10
7	(France) Valérie Gauvin	Montpellier	10
7	(Morocco) Salma Amani	Guingamp	10

=== Hat-tricks ===
Player	For	Against	Result	Date	Ref.
(France) Eugénie Le Sommer^{5}	Lyon	Soyaux	0–9	11 September 2016	
(France) Audrey Chaumette	Saint-Étienne	Bordeaux	0–7	25 September 2016	
(France) Camille Catala^{4}	Juvisy	Rodez	0–10	9 October 2016	
(France) Kadidiatou Diani	Juvisy	Rodez	0–10	9 October 2016	
(France) Eugénie Le Sommer	Lyon	Guingamp	9–1	30 October 2016	
(France) Laura Bourgouin	Soyaux	Bordeaux	2–3	30 October 2016	
(Morocco) Salma Amani	Guingamp	Marseille	4–0	6 November 2016	
(France) Marie-Laure Delie	Paris Saint-Germain	Juvisy	3–0	10 December 2016	
(Sweden) Sofia Jakobsson^{4}	Montpellier	Albi	7–0	21 December 2016	

^{5} Player scored 5 goals
^{4} Player scored 4 goals
