= LOSC =

LOSC, Losc. or L.O.S.C. may refer to:

- Lille OSC, a French football club
  - Lille OSC (women), women's department of the above
- "Law of the Sea Convention" (or "Law of the Sea Conference"), an example is the United Nations Convention on the Law of the Sea
