= Lynda Bendris =

Algerian footballer (born 2004)

Personal information
- Date of birth: 25 July 2004 (age 22)
- Place of birth: Metz, France
- Position: Forward

Team information
- Current team: AS Cannes
- Number: 9

Youth career
- 2014–2017: AS Clouange
- 2017–2021: FC Metz

Senior career*
Years	Team	Apps	(Gls)
2022–2023	FC Metz	2	(0)
2023–2024	Olympique de Marseille B	21	(0)
2024–	AS Cannes	15	(16)

International career^{‡}
2023	Algeria U20	2	(0)
2025–	Algeria	0	(0)
- * Club domestic league appearances and goals as of 16 February 2025 ‡ National team caps and goals as of 16 February 2025

Lynda Bendris (Arabic: ليندة بندريس; born 25 July 2004) is a professional footballer who plays as a striker for Division 3 Féminine club AS Cannes. Born in France, she plays for the Algeria national team.

== Club career ==
Bendriss joined the FC Metz academy in her hometown at the age of 13 in 2017 and later won the U15 French Championship with the club.

She later joined Olympique de Marseille, where she played for the reserve team in Régional Féminine 1.

In the summer of 2024, Bendriss joined Division 3 Féminine side AS Cannes and made her league debut for the club on September 15, 2024, against Monaco, where she netted a brace. After scoring in two of her three first matches, she caught fire in her fourth appearance, scoring a glut in just 12 minutes against Nîmes.

== International career ==
Bendris received her first call-up to the Algerian Under-20 team in July 2023 for a friendly match against the Ivory Coast senior team. She later took part in the FIFA World Cup Colombia 2024 qualifiers, playing in a doubleheader against Mali, where they were eliminated on away goals.

On February 16, 2025, she received her first call-up to the senior team for the 2026 Women's Africa Cup of Nations qualification matches against South Sudan.

== Career statistics ==
=== Club ===
As of match played February 16, 2025

Appearances and goals by club, season and competition
Club	Season	League			cup		Other		Total	
Club	Season	Division	Apps	Goals	Apps	Goals	Apps	Goals	Apps	Goals
FC Metz	2022–23	D2F	2	0	—		—		2	0
FC Metz	Total		2	0	—		—		2	0
AS Cannes	2024–25	D3F	12	13	3	3	—		15	16
AS Cannes	Total		12	13	3	3	—		15	16
Career total			14	13	3	3	—		17	16

=== International ===
As of match played 30 November 2024

Appearances and goals by national team and year
National team	Year	Apps	Goals
Algeria	2025	0	0
Total		0	0
