= Deborah Garcia =

Deborah Garcia may refer to:

- Deborah Garcia (footballer) (born 1994), French footballer
- Deborah Koons Garcia, American film director, writer and producer

== See also ==
- Débora García (born 1989), Spanish footballer
