= 2025–26 Seconde Ligue =

38th season of 2nd-tier French women's football league

Seconde Ligue
- Season: 2025–26
- Dates: 7 September 2025 – 24 May 2026
- Champions: Toulouse FC (2nd title)
- Relegated: Rodez AF; EA Guingamp
- Matches: 132
- Goals: 355 (2.69 per match)
- Best player: (Turkey) Selen Altunkulak
- Top goalscorer: (Turkey) Selen Altunkulak (18 goals)
- Best goalkeeper: (Canada) Taylor Beitz
- Biggest home win: Toulouse 5–1 Rodez (20 December 2025); Grenoble 4–0 Nice (26 April 2026); Lille 4–0 Guingamp (26 April 2026)
- Biggest away win: Saint-Malo 2–6 Toulouse (2 November 2025); Metz 1–5 Lille (22 February 2026)
- Highest scoring: Saint-Malo 2–6 Toulouse (2 November 2025); Rodez 4–4 Toulouse (25 April 2026); Metz 4–4 Thonon Évian (17 May 2026)
- Longest winning run: 8 matches Toulouse
- Longest unbeaten run: 13 matches Toulouse
- Longest winless run: 9 matches Metz
- Longest losing run: 6 matches Guingamp
- Highest attendance: 4,200; Toulouse 2–0 Metz (14 March 2026)
- Lowest attendance: 38; Reims 1–3 Saint-Malo (7 December 2025)
- Attendance: 44,618 (338 per match)

The 2025–26 Seconde Ligue season was the 38th season of the second tier of national women's football league in France and the second season since its rebranding as the Seconde Ligue.

The season began on 7 September 2025 and ended on 24 May 2026.

== Teams ==
Location of teams in 2025–26 Seconde Ligue

=== Team changes ===
Entering league		Exiting league	
Promoted from 2024–25 Division 3	Relegated from 2024–25 Première Ligue	Promoted to 2025–26 Première Ligue	Relegated to 2025–26 Division 3
AJ Auxerre; Grenoble Foot 38	Stade de Reims; EA Guingamp	Olympique de Marseille; RC Lens	US Orléans

=== Stadiums and locations ===
Team	Location	Stadium	Capacity	2024–25 season
AJ Auxerre	Auxerre	Stade de l'Abbé-Deschamps	18,541	D3, 1st (of 24) ▲
EA Guingamp	Saint-Brieuc	Complexe Sportif Akademi EAG 1		PL, 12th (of 12) ▼
FC Metz	Metz	Stade Dezavelle	1,500	6th (of 11)
Grenoble Foot 38	Grenoble	Stade Stijovic N°1		D3, 2nd (of 24) ▲
Le Mans FC	Le Mans	Parc des Sports La Californie 1		4th (of 11)
LOSC Lille	Lille	Stadium Terrain N°1		7th (of 11)
OGC Nice	Nice	Stade de la Plaine du Var N°1	1,000	9th (of 11)
Rodez AF	Rodez	Stade Paul-Lignon	5,955	10th (of 11)
Stade de Reims	Reims	Stade Blériot 2	1,000	PL, 11th (of 12) ▼
Thonon Evian GG FC	Ambilly	Stade Joseph-Moynat 1		8th (of 11)
Toulouse FC	Toulouse	Parc des Sports Stadium A1	1,000	3rd (of 11)
US Saint-Malo	Saint-Malo	Stade de Marville 1		5th (of 11)

=== Personnel and kits ===
Note: Flags indicate national team as has been defined under FIFA eligibility rules. Players and coaches may hold more than one non-FIFA nationality.

Team	Manager	Captain	Kit manufacturer	Kit sponsor(s)
Auxerre	(France) Cédric Mengual	(France) Emma Faure	(Italy) Macron	GLHD, Alba Voyages, Groupama
Grenoble	(France) Nasreddine Behloul	(France) Elsa Domenjoud	(Germany) Nike	Provencia, Isère departmental council
Guingamp	(France) Pierre-Henry Coulon	(Morocco) Sana Daoudi	(Italy) Kappa	Celtigel
Le Mans	(France) Damien Bollini	(France) Anaïs Gasnier	(Italy) Kappa	O2
Lille	(France) Mathieu Robail	(France) Claire Lelarge	(United States) New Balance	Lille Métropole
Metz	(France) Marine Morel	(France) Léa Munier	(Italy) Kappa	MOSL Mosselle Sans Limite, Topaz Group, FlitBix, Axia Interim
Nice	(France) Alain Wathelet	(France) Clara Galli	(Italy) Kappa	Robinhood
Reims	(France) Sarah Chalabi	(France) Inés Ou Mahi	(Germany) Puma	idverde, CAD Nord Est
Rodez	(France) Karima Taïeb	(France) Sophie Vaysse	(Germany) Adidas	RAGT
Saint-Malo	(France) Roland Jamelot	(France) Pamela Babinga	(Italy) Kappa	AR Collection Hotels, Cache Cache, CERAP
Thonon Evian	(France) Alfred Picariello	(France) Coline Stephen	(Germany) Nike	Groppi TP, Haute-Savoie le Département
Toulouse	(France) Antoine Gérard	(France) Lou Jumere Seignou	(Germany) Nike	GrowIN Fly

== Season ==
=== Standings ===
Pos	Team	Pld	W	D	L	GF	GA	GD	Pts	Qualification or relegation
1	Toulouse FC (P)	22	15	4	3	48	21	+27	49	Promotion to 2026–27 Première Ligue
2	US Saint-Malo (P)	22	12	4	6	34	28	+6	40	Promotion to 2026–27 Première Ligue
3	Le Mans FC	22	12	3	7	28	20	+8	39	
4	AJ Auxerre	22	10	5	7	30	25	+5	35	
5	Grenoble Foot 38	22	9	7	6	31	24	+7	34	
6	LOSC Lille	22	9	5	8	31	25	+6	32	
7	Thonon Evian GG FC	22	9	4	9	35	29	+6	31	
8	OGC Nice	22	8	5	9	28	31	−3	29	
9	Stade de Reims (R)	22	7	6	9	26	33	−7	27	Disbanded their women's professional team
10	FC Metz	22	6	4	12	31	41	−10	22	
11	Rodez AF (R)	22	6	4	12	16	32	−16	22	Relegation to 2026–27 Division 3 Féminine
12	EA Guingamp (R)	22	2	3	17	17	46	−29	9	Relegation to 2026–27 Division 3 Féminine

Source: FFF.fr
Rules for classification: 1) points; 2) head-to-head points; 3) head-to-head goal difference; 4) goal difference; 5) goals scored
(P) Promoted; (R) Relegated

=== Results ===
Home \ Away	AUX	EAG	MTZ	GRN	MAN	LIL	NIC	RDZ	REI	THN	TOU	SML
Auxerre	—	1–0	2–1	0–0	3–1	2–0	0–3	0–1	1–2	2–1	1–2	1–1
Guingamp	1–3	—	1–1	2–3	0–1	1–0	1–1	1–2	2–2	1–3	1–4	1–3
Metz	3–1	2–0	—	1–1	3–0	1–5	1–2	0–1	1–3	4–4	0–2	2–3
Grenoble	1–2	2–1	1–2	—	1–1	1–2	4–0	2–1	0–1	2–1	2–2	1–0
Le Mans	2–2	3–0	1–2	1–1	—	2–1	1–0	1–0	3–0	1–0	3–1	0–2
Lille	0–0	4–0	0–0	1–1	1–0	—	2–1	1–2	2–0	1–1	0–2	0–0
Nice	2–2	2–1	4–3	0–1	0–2	2–0	—	2–0	2–2	2–1	0–0	2–3
Rodez	0–1	1–0	0–2	0–2	0–1	1–3	0–0	—	0–0	1–0	4–4	0–3
Reims	1–2	2–1	4–1	2–1	0–2	3–1	0–2	0–0	—	0–2	0–0	1–3
Thonon Evian	2–1	2–0	2–1	1–2	1–0	2–3	3–0	3–1	2–2	—	2–0	1–2
Toulouse	1–0	3–0	2–0	2–1	0–2	3–2	2–0	5–1	3–0	2–0	—	2–0
Saint-Malo	0–3	1–2	2–0	1–1	2–0	0–2	2–1	1–0	2–1	1–1	2–6	—

Source: FFF.fr
Legend: Blue = home team win; Yellow = draw; Red = away team win.

== Season statistics ==
=== Scoring ===
- First goal of the season:
  - (Morocco) Kenza Chapelle (Le Mans) against Toulouse (7 September 2025)
- Last goal of the season:
  - (France) Maud Antoine (Metz) own goal for Nice (24 May 2026)

=== Top goalscorers ===
Rank	Player	Club	Goals
1	(Turkey) Selen Altunkulak	Toulouse	18
2	(France) Louna Lapassouse	Toulouse	15
3	(Morocco) Kenza Chapelle	Le Mans	11
4	(Tunisia) Salma Zemzem	Thonon Evian	10
4	(France) Pauline Haugou	Lille	10
4	(Algeria) Wissem Bouzid	Thonon Évian	10
7	(Algeria) Inès Boutaleb	Auxerre	9
8	(France) Anaïs Ribeyra	Metz	7
8	(France) Laurine Baga	Grenoble	7
10	(Jamaica) Mikayla Dayes	Metz	6
10	(Ukraine) Inna Hlushchenko	Lille	6
10	(France) Inès Barrier	Nice	6
10	(France) Thelma Eninger	Saint-Malo	6

=== Top assists ===
Rank	Player	Club	Assists
1	(Turkey) Selen Altunkulak	Toulouse	9
2	(France) Anna Conesa	Lille	8
3	(France) Thelma Eninger	Saint-Malo	7
3	(Morocco) Kenza Chapelle	Le Mans	7
5	(France) Anna Clérac	Thonon Évian	6
6	(France) Claudia Fabre	Grenoble	5
6	(Tunisia) Sana Guermazi	Le Mans	5
6	(Ivory Coast) Frédérique Abrogoua	Nice	5
6	(France) Julie Pian	Saint-Malo	5
10	(France) Louna Belhout-Achi	Lille	4
10	(Ukraine) Inna Hlushchenko	Lille	4
10	(France) Kahissa Saïdi	Reims	4
10	(France) Maëva Maniouloux	Reims	4
10	(France) Thelma Eninger	Saint-Malo	4

=== Most clean sheets ===
Rank	Player	Club	Clean sheets
1	(France) Jade Dumas	Le Mans	10
1	(France) Gaëlle Grillon	Toulouse	10
3	(Canada) Taylor Beitz	Lille	7
4	(France) Marie Percebois	Auxerre	6
4	(France) Deborah Garcia	Rodez	6
6	(France) Maureen Saint-Léger	Nice	5
7	(France) Ambre Bouchard	Reims	4
7	(France) Julie Tissino	Grenoble	4
7	(Morocco) Inès Arouaissa	Saint-Malo	4
10	(France) Justine Rousseeu	Thonon Evian	3

=== Discipline ===
	Most yellow cards	Total	Most red cards	Total
Player	(France) Jamila Hamidou (Lille)	8	(France) Julie Genty (Metz)	2
Club	Nice; Lille	49	Thonon Evian; Metz	3

== Awards ==
=== Player of the Month ===
Month	Winner	Club	Ref.
September 2025	(France) Tatiana Solanet	Toulouse	
October 2025	(Algeria) Wissem Bouzid	Thonon Évian	
November 2025	(Turkey) Selen Altunkulak	Toulouse	
December 2025	(France) Thelma Eninger	Saint-Malo	
January 2026	(Tunisia) Salma Zemzem	Thonon Évian	
February 2026	(Turkey) Selen Altunkulak	Toulouse	
March 2026	(France) Louna Lapassouse	Toulouse	

== See also ==
- 2025–26 Première Ligue
