= Gloria Mabomba =

DR Congolese footballer (born 1998)

Personal information
- Date of birth: 19 March 1998 (age 28)
- Place of birth: Etten-Leur, Netherlands
- Position: Forward

Team information
- Current team: Auxerre
- Number: 9

Senior career*
Years	Team	Apps	(Gls)
2016–2017	Reims	13	(2)
2017–2018	Rodez	13	(3)
2018–2019	Yzeure	11	(0)
2019	Saint-Maur	1	(0)
2019–2020	Nancy	15	(3)
2021–	Auxerre	16	(8)

International career^{‡}
2023–	DR Congo	4	(1)
- * Club domestic league appearances and goals as of 2 February 2025 ‡ National team caps and goals as of 20 February 2025

Gloria Mabomba (born 19 March 1998) is a professional footballer who plays as a forward for Division 3 Féminine club Auxerre. Born in the Netherlands, she represents the Democratic Republic of the Congo at international level.

== Club career ==
In August 2018, She joined Division 2 Féminine side FF Yzeure Allier Auvergne.

Signed by AS Nancy in September 2019, Mabomba has stood out since the start of the season with her blistering pace and dynamic attacking runs, causing trouble for opposing defenses.

== International career ==
Born in the Netherlands. Mabomba received her first call-up to the Congolese national team in November 2023 for a qualifying doubleheader against Equatorial Guinea. It was only on 7 December 2023, after the doubleheader, that FIFA confirmed her switch from the Netherlands to DR Congo and her eligibility to represent les Léopards dames. On 12 July 2024, She made her debut against Senegal as starter in a 1–0 loss in Thiès. On 20 February 2025, She scored her first international goal against Botswana in the 2026 WAFCON qualifiers.

== Career statistics ==
=== International ===
As of match played 20 February 2025

Appearances and goals by national team and year
National team	Year	Apps	Goals
DR Congo	2024	3	0
DR Congo	2025	1	1
Total		4	1

Scores and results list DR Congo's goal tally first, score column indicates score after each Mabomba goal.

List of international goals scored by Gloria Mabomba
No.	Date	Venue	Opponent	Score	Result	Competition
1	20 February 2025	Obed Itani Chilume Stadium, Francistown, Botswana	Botswana	2–0	2–0	2026 WAFCON qualification
