= Virginie Dessalle =

French footballer (born 1981)

Personal information
- Date of birth: 3 July 1981 (age 45)
- Position: Midfielder

Senior career*
Years	Team	Apps	(Gls)
2008–2011	Toulouse	29	(7)

International career^{‡}
	France	1	(0)
- * Club domestic league appearances and goals ‡ National team caps and goals as of 29 September 2003

Virginie Dessalle (born 3 July 1981) is a French women's international footballer who plays as a midfielder. She is a member of the France women's national football team. She was part of the team at the 2003 FIFA Women's World Cup.
