= Deborah Garcia (footballer) =

French footballer (born 1994)

Personal information
- Full name: Deborah Garcia
- Date of birth: 17 October 1994 (age 32)
- Place of birth: Perpignan, France
- Height: 1.68 m (5 ft 6 in)
- Position: Goalkeeper

Team information
- Current team: Toulouse
- Number: 1

International career
Years	Team	Apps	(Gls)
- France (women U-19)

Déborah Garcia (born 17 October 1994) is a French footballer who plays as a goalkeeper for Toulouse playing in France's Seconde Ligue.
