= 2025–26 Première Ligue =

52nd season of top French women's football league

Première Ligue
- Season: 2025–26
- Dates: 6 September 2025 – 29 May 2026
- Champions: Lyon (19th title)
- Relegated: Saint-Étienne
- Champions League: Lyon; Paris FC; Paris Saint-Germain
- Matches: 132
- Goals: 393 (2.98 per match)
- Top goalscorer: Romée Leuchter (18 goals)
- Longest winning run: Lyon (12 matches)
- Longest unbeaten run: Lyon (22 matches)
- Longest winless run: Montpellier (13 matches)
- Longest losing run: Lens (6 matches)

The 2025–26 Première Ligue season, also known as Arkema Première Ligue for sponsorship reasons, was the 52nd season of top national women's football league in France and the second season since its rebranding as Première Ligue. Lyon were the defending champions, having won their record-extending 18th title in the 2024–25 season.

The season began on 6 September 2025 and ended on 29 May 2026 with the play-off final.

Lyon successfully defended their title after defeating Paris FC in the final 5–0.

== Teams ==
Location of teams in the 2025–26 Première Ligue

Team	Home city	Home ground
Dijon	Dijon	Stade Gaston Gérard
Fleury	Fleury-Mérogis	Stade Robert Bobin
Le Havre	Le Havre	Stade Océane
Lens	Lens	Stade François Blin
Lyon	Lyon	Parc Olympique Lyonnais
Marseille	Marseille	OM Campus
Montpellier	Montpellier	Bernard Gasset Training Centre
Nantes	Nantes	Stade Marcel-Saupin
Paris FC	Paris	Stade Sébastien Charléty
Paris Saint-Germain	Paris	Campus PSG
Saint-Étienne	Saint-Étienne	Stade Salif-Keita
Strasbourg	Strasbourg	Stade de la Meinau

=== Team changes ===
Promoted from 2024–25 Seconde Ligue	Relegated from 2024–25 Première Ligue
Marseille; Lens	Guingamp; Reims

== Regular season ==
=== Standings ===
Pos	Team	Pld	W	D	L	GF	GA	GD	Pts	Qualification or relegation
1	Lyon (C)	22	19	3	0	76	11	+65	60	Qualification for the playoffs
2	Paris FC	22	15	3	4	46	16	+30	48	Qualification for the playoffs
3	Paris Saint-Germain	22	15	2	5	48	26	+22	47	Qualification for the playoffs
4	Nantes	22	12	5	5	42	34	+8	41	Qualification for the playoffs
5	Fleury	22	9	6	7	27	21	+6	33	
6	Dijon (D, R)	22	9	6	7	21	28	−7	33	Excluded from national competitions
7	Strasbourg	22	7	5	10	26	38	−12	26	
8	Le Havre	22	5	6	11	25	45	−20	21	
9	Marseille	22	5	4	13	26	44	−18	19	
10	Montpellier	22	4	3	15	28	45	−17	15	
11	Lens	22	4	3	15	20	50	−30	15	Repechage
12	Saint-Étienne (R)	22	3	4	15	11	38	−27	13	Relegation to the Seconde Ligue

Source: FFF.fr
Rules for classification: 1) points; 2) head-to-head points; 3) head-to-head goal difference; 4) goal difference; 5) goals scored
(C) Champions; (D) Disqualified; (R) Relegated

=== Results ===
Home \ Away	DIJ	FLE	LEN	LHV	LYO	MAR	MON	NAN	PFC	PSG	SET	STR
Dijon	—	1–1	1–1	2–1	0–3	1–1	2–1	1–1	1–2	0–4	2–0	0–4
Fleury	0–0	—	4–0	1–0	0–2	1–1	1–0	1–2	0–2	0–2	0–0	3–1
Lens	0–1	0–2	—	2–1	1–8	0–1	2–1	3–4	1–2	0–3 (Note: Lens forfeited the match for fielding an ineligible player, Louann Archier. The match had originally ended in a 1–1 draw.)	1–0	0–1
Le Havre	0–1	1–1	0–1	—	0–7	2–2	3–2	3–3	0–4	0–4	0–0	2–2
Lyon	4–0	3–0	1–0	3–0	—	3–1	3–1	6–1	1–0	6–1	4–0	5–0
Marseille	0–1	0–2	2–0	1–2	2–6	—	1–2	0–2	0–3	1–5	0–1	0–0
Montpellier	1–1	1–2	3–1	1–2	1–5	0–3	—	1–2	0–2	2–3	1–0	2–0
Nantes	1–2	2–0	2–2	2–1	1–1	3–0	2–2	—	3–1	1–2	2–1	0–1
Paris FC	2–0	2–1	6–2	3–0	0–0	6–1	2–1	1–2	—	0–3	2–0	3–0
Paris Saint-Germain	1–0	0–3 (Note: Paris Saint-Germain forfeited the match for fielding an ineligible player, Florianne Jourde. The match had originally ended in a 4–0 win for PSG.)	3–0	0–3 (Note: Paris Saint-Germain forfeited the match for fielding an ineligible player, Florianne Jourde. The match had originally ended in a 2–0 win for PSG.)	0–1	2–1	2–2	5–2	0–0	—	2–0	2–0
Saint-Étienne	0–1	1–1	2–1	1–1	0–2	0–4	4–2	0–1	0–3	1–4	—	0–2
Strasbourg	0–3	0–3	2–2	2–3	2–2	2–4	2–1	0–3	0–0	3–0 (Note: Paris Saint-Germain forfeited the match for fielding an ineligible player, Florianne Jourde. The match had originally ended in a 0–1 win for PSG.)	2–0	—

Source: FFF.fr
Legend: Blue = home team win; Yellow = draw; Red = away team win.
For upcoming matches, an "a" indicates there is an article about the rivalry between the two participants.

== Playoffs ==
The top four teams from the regular season (Lyon, Paris FC, Paris Saint-Germain and Nantes, the latter of whom are making their first ever playoffs appearance) qualified for the playoffs. In the semi-finals, Lyon (the team that finished first) will play the team which finished fourth, while the team that finished second plays the team that finished third. The two winners play each other in the final.

The winner of the play-offs is crowned the champion for the 2025–26 season and secures the first qualification spot for the 2026–27 Champions League. The remaining two qualification spots are allocated to the two best-ranked teams based on the regular season standings (excluding the play-off winner). Lyon have guaranteed qualification to the League Phase as regular season winners, while Paris FC and Paris Saint-Germain have guaranteed qualification at least into round 3 of the qualifying rounds as the second-place and third-place finishers.

Semi-finals
1	Lyon	8
4	Nantes	0
2	Paris FC	1
3	Paris Saint-Germain	0

Final
Lyon	5
Paris FC	0

=== Semi-finals ===
16 May 2026
18:00 CEST

Lyon	8–0	Nantes
Dumornay 46', 60'; Bècho 50'; Renard 53'; Heaps 67'; Hegerberg 80' (pen.), 85', 89'	Report

Parc Olympique Lyonnais, Décines-Charpieu
Referee: Romy Fournier
16 May 2026
21:00 CEST

Paris FC	1–0	Paris Saint-Germain
Sangaré 88'	Report

Stade Jean-Bouin, Paris
Referee: Audrey Gerbel

=== Final ===
29 May 2026
21:00 CEST

Lyon	5–0	Paris FC
Chawinga 11', 17'; Dumornay 22', 60', 89'	Report

Parc Olympique Lyonnais, Décines-Charpieu
Referee: Elisa Daupeux

== Statistics ==
As of 6 May 2026

=== Top scorers ===
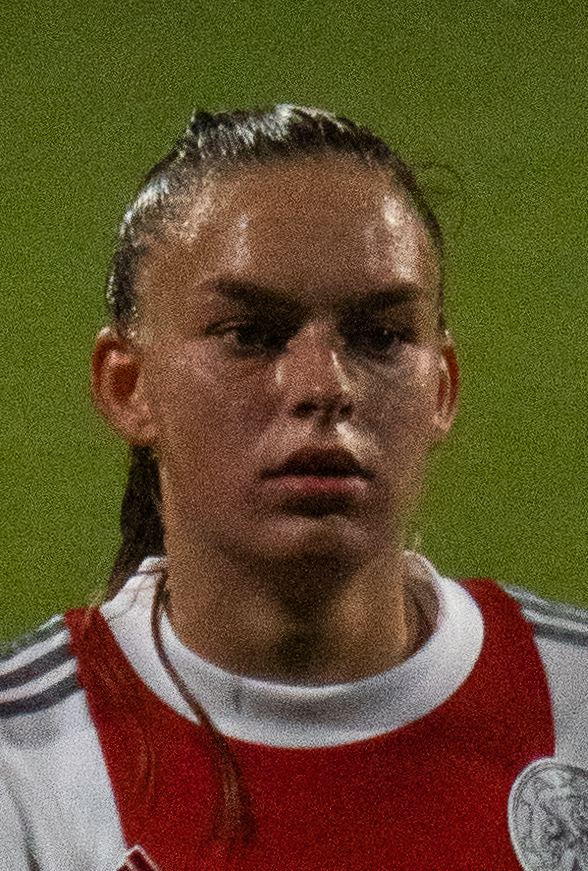
Romée Leuchter finished the season as the top scorer with 18 goals.

Rank	Player	Club	Goals
1	(Netherlands) Romée Leuchter	Paris Saint-Germain	18
2	(France) Mathilde Bourdieu	Marseille	11
2	(France) Lucie Calba	Nantes	11
2	(Malawi) Tabitha Chawinga	Lyon	11
2	(Benin) Aude Gbedjissi	Lens	11
2	(Democratic Republic of the Congo) Merveille Kanjinga	Paris Saint-Germain	11
7	(France) Emelyne Laurent	Fleury	10
8	(France) Maëlle Garbino	Paris FC	9
8	(France) Justine Rouquet	Montpellier	9
10	(France) Lorena Azzaro	Paris FC	8
10	(France) Vicki Bècho	Lyon	8
10	(France) Clara Mateo	Paris FC	8

==== Hat-tricks ====
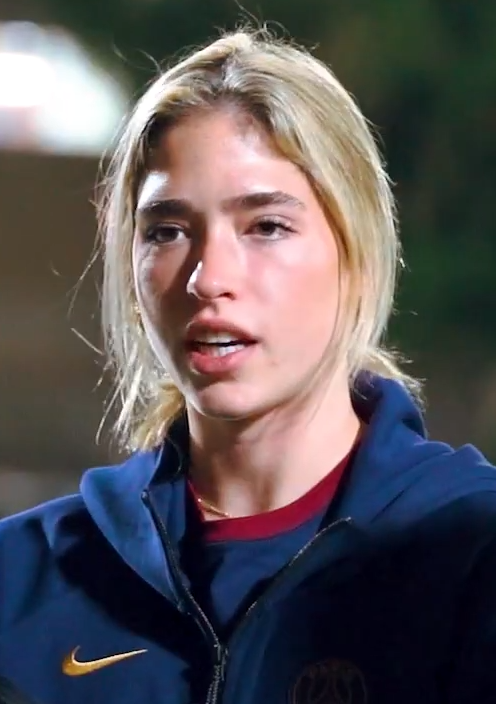
Korbin Shrader became the second Lyon player to score a hat-trick against Paris Saint-Germain. The first was Ada Hegerberg in 2015.

Player	Club	Against	Result	Date
(United States) Korbin Shrader	Lyon	Paris Saint-Germain	6–1 (H)	27 September 2025
(France) Vicki Bècho	Lyon	Lens	8–1 (A)	3 October 2025
(France) Liana Joseph	Lyon	Lens	8–1 (A)	3 October 2025
(France) Emelyne Laurent	Fleury	Lens	4–0 (H)	1 November 2025
(France) Mathilde Bourdieu^{4}	Marseille	Strasbourg	4–2 (A)	8 February 2026
(Netherlands) Romée Leuchter	Paris Saint-Germain	Lens	3–0 (H)	20 February 2026

(H) – Home; (A) – Away
^{4} – Player scored four goals.

=== Most clean sheets ===
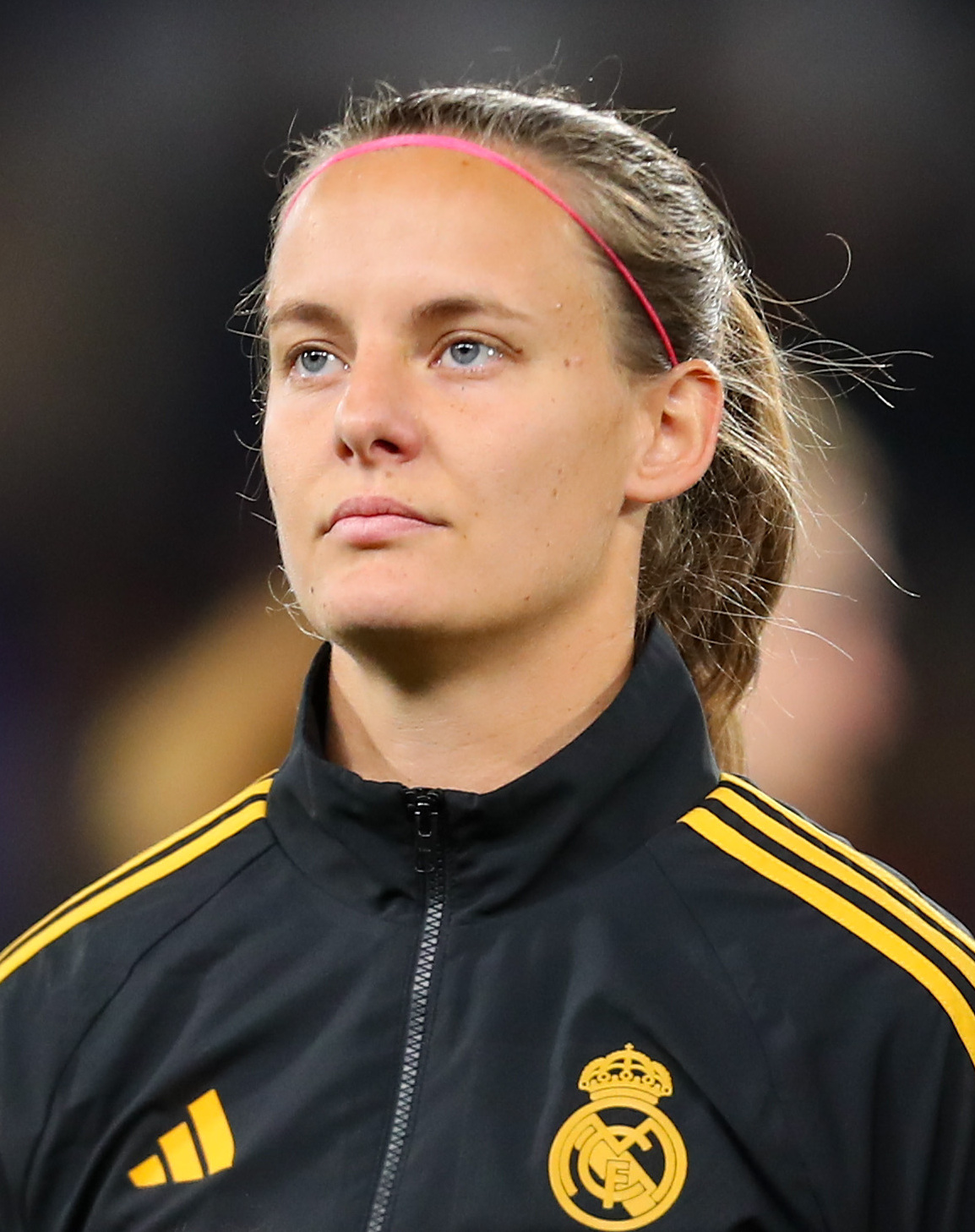
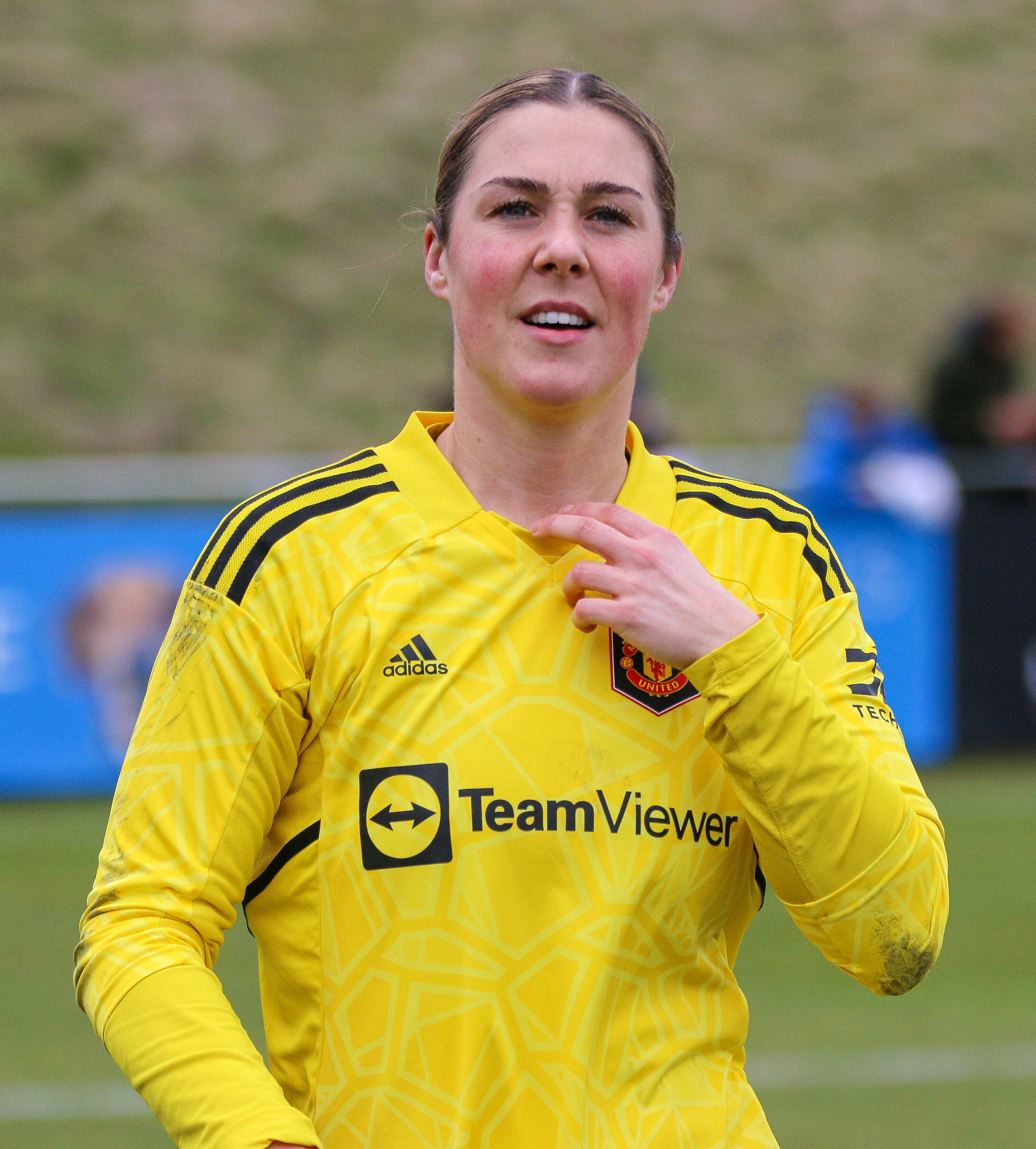
Mylène Chavas and Mary Earps finished the season with 12 clean sheets.

Rank	Player	Club	Clean sheets
1	(France) Mylène Chavas	Paris FC	12
1	(England) Mary Earps	Paris Saint-Germain	12
3	(France) Constance Picaud	Fleury	8
4	(Finland) Katriina Talaslahti	Dijon	7
4	(France) Manon Wahl	Strasbourg	7
6	(Canada) Emily Burns	Nantes	5
6	(Chile) Christiane Endler	Lyon	5
6	(Italy) Margot Shore	Marseille	5
9	(France) Féerine Belhadj	Lyon	4
9	(Australia) Teagan Micah	Lyon	4

=== Discipline ===
==== Player ====
- Most yellow cards: 7
  - (France) Anaïs Ebayilin (Paris Saint-Germain)
- Most red cards: 1
  - (Switzerland) Eseosa Aigbogun
  - (France) Nadjma Ali Nadjim
  - (France) Faustine Bataillard (Saint-Étienne)
  - (France) Annaïg Butel (Fleury)
  - (France) Shana Chossenotte
  - (Canada) Alex Lamontagne (Saint-Étienne)
  - (Cameroon) Monique Ngock (Fleury)
  - (Portugal) Fátima Pinto (Strasbourg)
  - (France) Manon Revelli (Lens)

==== Club ====
- Most yellow cards: 46
  - Le Havre
- Most red cards: 4
  - Saint-Étienne
- Fewest yellow cards: 23
  - Lyon
- Fewest red cards: 0
  - Le Havre
  - Lyon
  - Marseille
  - Nantes
  - Paris FC
  - Paris Saint-Germain

== Awards ==
=== Player of the Month ===
Month	Winner	Club	Ref.
September 2025	(France) Clara Mateo	Paris FC	
October 2025	(France) Sonia Ouchene	Montpellier	
November 2025	(Germany) Jule Brand	Lyon	
December 2025	(France) Lucie Calba	Nantes	
January 2026	(Belgium) Mariam Toloba	Nantes	
February 2026	(Netherlands) Romée Leuchter	Paris Saint-Germain	
March 2026	(France) Sakina Karchaoui	Paris Saint-Germain	
April 2026	(France) Maeline Mendy	Paris FC	

=== UNFP Annual Awards ===
These awards are presented by Union Nationale des Footballeurs Professionnels. The winners were announced on 11 May 2026.

Award	Winner	Club
Player of the Year	(Haiti) Melchie Dumornay	Lyon
Young Player of the Year	(France) Justine Rouquet	Montpellier
Goalkeeper of the Year	(France) Mylène Chavas	Paris FC

Team of the Year
Goalkeeper	(France) Mylène Chavas (Paris FC)			
Defenders	(France) Melween N'Dongala (Paris FC)	(France) Griedge Mbock (Paris Saint-Germain)	(France) Wendie Renard (Lyon)	(France) Sakina Karchaoui (Paris Saint-Germain)
Midfielders	(Algeria) Mélissa Bethi (Nantes)	(United States) Lily Yohannes (Lyon)	(Haiti) Melchie Dumornay (Lyon)	
Forwards	(Malawi) Tabitha Chawinga (Lyon)	(France) Clara Mateo (Paris FC)	(Netherlands) Romée Leuchter (Paris Saint-Germain)	

=== LFFP Annual Awards ===
These awards are presented by Ligue féminine de football professionnel. The winners were announced on 18 May 2026.

Award	Winner	Club
Best Player	(Haiti) Melchie Dumornay	Lyon
Best Young Player	(France) Justine Rouquet	Montpellier
Best Goalkeeper	(France) Mylène Chavas	Paris FC
Best Manager	(France) Nicolas Chabot	Nantes
Goal of the Season	(France) Lucie Calba	Nantes

Team of the Season
Goalkeeper	(France) Mylène Chavas (Paris FC)			
Defenders	(France) Melween N'Dongala (Paris FC)	(France) Wendie Renard (Lyon)	(France) Alice Sombath (Lyon)	(France) Selma Bacha (Lyon)
Midfielders	(France) Sakina Karchaoui (Paris Saint-Germain)	(France) Julie Swierot (Nantes)	(Haiti) Melchie Dumornay (Lyon)	
Forwards	(Democratic Republic of the Congo) Merveille Kanjinga (Paris Saint-Germain)	(Netherlands) Romée Leuchter (Paris Saint-Germain)	(France) Mathilde Bourdieu (Marseille)	

== See also ==
- 2025–26 Seconde Ligue
- 2025–26 Coupe de France Féminine
- 2025–26 Coupe LFFP
