= ES Troyes AC Féminine =

Troyes Féminine
- Full name: Espérance Sportive Troyes; Aube Champagne Féminine
- Nickname(s): ESTAC
- Ground: Complexe Sportif De L'Aube
- Owner: City Football Group
- Chairman: Thierry Blanchot
- Manager: Michel Mimpia
- League: Féminines Régional 1 Grand Est
- 2019–20: Régional 1 Pool B, 1st (season abandoned)
- Website: https://www.estac.fr
Home colours	Away colours

Troyes AC Féminine is a French football representing ES Troyes AC. It currently competes in the Féminines Régional 1 Grand Est.

== History ==
Having competed in the third tier of French women's football for ten seasons, Troyes were denied promotion to Division 2 by the early cancellation of the 2019–20 season, during which they had built up a four-point lead after eleven unbeaten games.

Later the following year, Troyes became part of the City Football Group when the organisation purchased a majority shareholding in Troyes AC, becoming the fourth senior women side run by the group.

== National competition record ==
Season	Division	Place	Coupe de France
2008–09	Division d'Honneur		1st national round
2009–10	Division 3	10th	1st national round
2010–11	Division d'Honneur		Regional rounds
2011–12	Division d'Honneur		1st national round
2012–13	Division d'Honneur		Regional rounds
2013–14	Division d'Honneur		1st national round
2014–15	Division d'Honneur		Regional rounds
2015–16	Division d'Honneur		Round of 32
2016–17	Division d'Honneur		1st national round
2017–18	Division d'Honneur		1st national round
2018–19	Régional 1	2nd	1st national round
2019–20	Régional 1	1st	1st national round
2020–21	Division d'Honneur	Abandoned	Regional rounds
2021–22	Régional 1		Regional rounds
