= AJ Auxerre (women) =

Women's football club in Auxerre, France

Auxerre
- Full name: Association de la Jeunesse Auxerroise
- Nicknames: Les Icaunaises; Les Auxerroises
- Short name: AJ Auxerre, AJA-Stade
- Founded: 2018; 8 years ago
- Ground: Stade Abbé Deschamps A3
- Coordinates: 47°46′12.31″N 3°35′19.19″E
- Coach: John Songné
- League: Seconde Ligue
- 2025–26: Seconde Ligue, 4th of 12
- Website: aja.fr
Home colours	Away colours	Third colours

Association de la Jeunesse Auxerroise (French pronunciation: [asɔsjɑsjɔ̃ də la ʒœnɛs osɛʁwaz]), commonly known as AJ Auxerre or just Auxerre, is a French professional women's football club based in the commune of Auxerre in Bourgogne-Franche-Comté. It serves as the women's section of its Ligue 1 namesake and competes in the Seconde Ligue – the second tier of the French league system.

== History ==
The club established its women's section in 2018 and entered the league system the same year at the Régional 2 level, the second tier of regional football. The team achieved immediate success by securing promotion in its inaugural season. After five years in Régional 1, the team topped the Bourgogne-Franche-Comté regional league and secured promotion to Division 3 Féminine following a two-legged playoff victory over Orvault Sports Football. In their debut season at the third tier, the team won their group and achieved promotion to the Seconde Ligue for the first time in their history, marking another milestone in the club's progression.

== Players ==
=== Current squad ===
As of 18 May 2025

Note: Flags indicate national team as defined under FIFA eligibility rules; some limited exceptions apply. Players may hold more than one non-FIFA nationality.

No.	Pos.	Nation	Player
—	GK	FRA	Marie Percebois
—	GK	SEN	Khady Gueye
—	GK	FRA	Louise Busso
—	DF	MAR	Chaïma Aït-Mouhou
—	DF	FRA	Emma Faure
—	DF	FRA	Sorène Goncalves
—	DF	FRA	Eudoxie Loubaki
—	DF	FRA	Joye Serrano Mijan
—	DF	FRA	Orokia Sissoko
—	DF	MLI	Coulouba Sogore
—	DF	FRA	Pauline Vassard
—	MF	FRA	Laura Beatrix
—	MF	FRA	Tamara Collin

No.	Pos.	Nation	Player
—	MF	FRA	Wande Guereve
—	MF	NGA	Samiat Martins
—	MF	FRA	Chiara Praino
—	MF	BEN	Lucie Tengue
—	MF	FRA	Chloé Tirilly
—	MF	FRA	Amandine Vinatier
—	FW	TUN	Myriam Bayahia
—	FW	FRA	Colleen Cruman
—	FW	FRA	Coralie Delacellery
—	FW	COD	Gloria Mabomba
—	FW	BEN	Milhad Sadikou
—	FW	ROU	Loredana Stefut
