= RC Strasbourg Alsace (women) =

French women's football club, based in Strasbourg

RC Strasbourg
- Full name: Racing Club de Strasbourg Alsace Féminines
- Founded: 2011; 15 years ago
- Ground: Stade Jean-Nicolas Muller, Strasbourg
- Capacity: 1,000
- President: Marc Keller
- Manager: Sophie-Margaux Lagandré
- League: Première Ligue
- 2025–26: Première Ligue, 7th of 12
Home colours	Away colours	Third colours

Racing Club de Strasbourg Alsace Féminines, commonly known as RC Strasbourg, or simply Racing, is a French professional association football club based in Strasbourg. Founded in 2011, it currently competes in the Première Ligue.

== History ==
The women's section of RC Strasbourg Alsace began in 2011 with an under-7 team, laying the foundation for the senior team, which was established five years later for the 2016–2017 season. In 2019, Les Strasbourgeoises clinched the Alsace Regional 1 championship but fell short in the national promotion playoffs to reach Division 2. However, in 2020, Racing was promoted to Division 2. Their first match in the second tier was a derby against FC Vendenheim where the team won 2–1. After four seasons in Division 2, the team was crowned champions in the 2023–24 season, achieving promotion to Division 1 Féminine for the first time in the club's history.

== Players ==
=== Current squad ===
As of 7 July 2026

Note: Flags indicate national team as defined under FIFA eligibility rules; some limited exceptions apply. Players may hold more than one non-FIFA nationality.

No.	Pos.	Nation	Player
1	GK	FRA	Manon Wahl
2	DF	SEN	Marème Babou
3	DF	FRA	Grace Kazadi
4	DF	POR	Bruna Lourenço
5	DF	FRA	Anaëlle Tchakounté
8	MF	GER	Kristin Kögel
9	FW	SEN	Mama Diop
11	FW	SUI	Ana-Maria Crnogorčević
12	DF	FRA	Amandine Béché
13	MF	POR	Fátima Pinto
15	DF	FRA	Clémence Mairot
16	GK	FRA	Manon Le Page
17	MF	FRA	Célia Bensalem
18	DF	FRA	Amanda Chaney

No.	Pos.	Nation	Player
19	FW	CIV	Inès Konan
20	MF	FRA	Mégane Hoeltzel
21	DF	FRA	Élise Bonet
23	FW	SUI	Eseosa Aigbogun
27	MF	FRA	Laurine Hannequin
31	MF	FRA	Léa Sylejmani
32	DF	MAR	Siham Bouhouch
33	DF	FRA	Elise Pilmes
40	GK	FRA	Ellie Taiana
67	FW	FRA	Ananée Yeboah
80	FW	FRA	Manssita Traoré
—	MF	POL	Natalia Wróbel
—	FW	AUT	Viktoria Pinther
—	DF	DEN	Emilie Byrnak

== Current staff ==
As of 26 December 2024

Position	Staff
Head coach	(France) Vincent Nogueira
Assistant coaches	(France) Guillaume Stiegler
Goalkeeping coach	(France) Landry Bonnefoi
Physical trainer	(France) Sara Faure
Video analyst	(France) Evan Princé
Physiotherapists	(France) Anais Frey
General manager/team delegate	(France) Sophie-Margaux Lagandré

== Honours ==
=== Domestic ===
- Division 2 Féminine (level 2)

Champions (1) 2023–24

== List of seasons ==
Champions	Runners-up	Promoted	Relegated

Season	League										Coupe	Top goalscorer(s)	
Season	Division	Pos	Pld	W	D	L	GF	GA	GD	Pts	Pos	Name(s)	Goals
2020–21	D2	7th	5	2	0	3	12	8	+4	6		(France) Marie Perrotte	3
2021–22	D2	5th	22	11	4	7	29	18	+11	32		(France) Madeline Roth	10
2022–23	D2	3rd	22	11	7	4	37	22	+15	40		(Canada) Latifah Abdu	9
2023–24	D2	1st	22	15	6	1	40	11	+29	51		(Morocco) Kenza Chapelle	13
2024–25	PL	9th	22	3	8	11	22	39	-17	17	R16		
2025–26	PL										SF		
