= RC Roubaix Wervicq Féminin =

RC Roubaix-Wervicq
- Full name: Racing Club Roubaix Wervicq Féminin
- Founded: 2018; 7 years ago
- Ground: Stade Antoine Maillard
- Capacity: 3,000
- President: Jean-Baptiste Gallen
- Manager: Samuel Delcroix
- League: Division 3 Féminine
- 2024–25: D3 Group A: 3rd of 12
- Website: rcrwf.football
Home colours	Away colours

Racing Club Roubaix Wervicq Féminin (RCRWF), commonly known as RC Roubaix-Wervicq, is a French women's association football club founded in 2018 and based in the city of Roubaix. It is currently playing in Division 3 Féminine, the third-tier of French Football.

== History ==
Founded in May 2018, the club originated in Bousbecque, Nord. The project began in April 2017, when entrepreneur Jean-Baptiste Gallen attended a women's football match in Bousbecque. Struck by the poor quality of the players' equipment, he initially financed new kits, becoming a first partner of the team. A return visit in September 2017, during which the players expressed their gratitude, motivated him to take a more active role in the project.

With additional financial support from private investors, the team quickly developed into a fully structured club. The number of registered players grew from 14 to 100 within a few months, enabling the establishment of a formal sporting organisation and youth sections. This rapid growth culminated in the transformation of the team into a fully dedicated women's football club, officially named FC Bousbecque Féminin (FCBF) in May 2018, and it subsequently joined the regional league system.

In September 2022, a little over three years after its creation, the club relocated its senior operations to Roubaix and adopted the name RC Roubaix-Wervicq. Home matches were moved to the Roubaix Velodrome, while some youth and training activities continued to take place in Wervicq. The move was intended to provide improved infrastructure and support the club's long-term objective of reaching elite levels in French women's football.

In May 2023, following the reintroduction of the Division 3 Féminine, Roubaix-Wervicq secured promotion to the league after winning their Hauts-de-France regional league.

== Players ==
=== Current squad ===
As of 17 December 2025

Note: Flags indicate national team as defined under FIFA eligibility rules; some limited exceptions apply. Players may hold more than one non-FIFA nationality.

No.	Pos.	Nation	Player
1	GK	FRA	Anaïs Elie
2	DF	FRA	Chloé Bourt
3	DF	FRA	Laura Obrecht
5	DF	FRA	Éléa Lejeune
6	MF	FRA	Victoire Martinowski
7	DF	FRA	Noame Boukrim
8	FW	MAR	Oumayma El Amrani
9	FW	CMR	Chanel Tchaptchet
10	MF	MLI	Heïta Baradji
11	FW	FRA	Emna Guembar
13	DF	FRA	Andréa Prette
14	MF	ALG	Lydia Belkacemi
15	FW	FRA	Chloé Zubieta
16	GK	FRA	Arwenn Lhermet

No.	Pos.	Nation	Player
17	MF	FRA	Lucie Dive
19	FW	FRA	Julie Micard
20	FW	CMR	Confidence Buh
22	DF	MLI	Orokia Sissoko
23	FW	FRA	Keilya Coupé
25	DF	MLI	Coumba Dembele
26	FW	FRA	Mariam Marega
27	DF	FRA	Gwenaëlle Devleesschauwer
28	MF	FRA	Justine Rougemont
29	MF	FRA	Sasha Pinot
31	FW	FRA	Léona Boddaert
32	FW	MAR	Maysane Khelifi
—	GK	FRA	Juline Beyens

== Current staff ==
As of 17 December 2025

Position	Staff
Head coach	(France) Samuel Delcroix
Assistant coach	(France) David Devogel
Goalkeeping coach	(France) Rayan Vouzellaud
Physical trainer	(France) Rémi Lejeune
Physiotherapist	(France) Maxime Jankowski
