= Rodez AF (women) =

- Full name: Rodez Aveyron Football Section Féminine
- Nickname: Les Rafettes
- Founded: 1993
- Ground: Stade Paul-Lignon, Rodez
- Capacity: 5,955
- President: Pierre-Olivier Murat
- Head coach: Karima Taieb
- League: Division 3 Féminine
- 2025–26: Seconde Ligue, 11th of 12 (relegated)
- Website: www.rodezaveyronfootball.com
Home colours	Away colours	Third colours

Rodez Aveyron Football Section Féminine (commonly known as Rodez) is a French football club based in Rodez which plays in the Division 3 Féminine. The women's department of the men's football club was founded in 1993 and are known as the Rafettes.

Rodez plays its home matches at the Stadium Paul-Lignon in Rodez which has a capacity of 5,548 spectators. They are coached by Sébastien Joseph.

== Players ==
=== Current squad ===
Updated 14 September 2024 Sources: Official website, footofeminin.fr,

Note: Flags indicate national team as defined under FIFA eligibility rules; some limited exceptions apply. Players may hold more than one non-FIFA nationality.

No.	Pos.	Nation	Player
1	GK	FRA	Laurie Libourel
4	DF	FRA	Éloïse Sévenne
7	MF	SEN	Aimy Diop
9	FW	GAM	Adama Tamba
10	MF	ALG	Nouhed Naili
11	MF	ROU	Anne-Marie Banuta
12	MF	FRA	Maëlle Saltel
13	DF	FRA	Alicia Soleilhet
14	FW	CIV	Kade Tanh
15	FW	FRA	Océane Saunier
16	GK	FRA	Flavie Philippe

No.	Pos.	Nation	Player
17	FW	UGA	Natasha Shirazi
18	FW	FRA	Ninon Barnoin
19	MF	FRA	Marie Bousquet
20	MF	FRA	Caroline Devant
21	DF	HAI	Jasmine Vilgrain
22	MF	FRA	Sophie Vaysse
23	DF	FRA	Tiphaine Brissonnet
24	MF	FRA	Solène Barbance
28	FW	JAM	Mikayla Dayes
33	FW	FRA	Louan Guérin
