= ASPTT Albi =

Albi Marssac Tarn Football ASPTT
- Full name: Association Sportive de La Poste et France Télécom Albi
- Nicknames: Les Jaunardes, Les Pourries
- Ground: Stade Maurice Rigaud
- Capacity: 3,000
- Chairman: Bernard Espié
- Manager: Alain Benedet
- League: Seconde Ligue
- 2023–24: Division 2 Féminine, 10th of 12
- Website: http://www.asptt-albi-football.fr/

Albi Marssac Tarn Football ASPTT (or Association Sportive de La Poste et France Télécom Albi) is a French women's football team based in Albi. The first team plays at the Stade Maurice Rigaud.

The club reached Division 2 Féminine in 2000 for the first time in their history, however they were relegated the following season. After several seasons in the regional divisions of the Ligue de Midi-Pyrénées, the club was promoted again to Division 2 in 2007 after a rapid promotion from the third division. They won Division 2 in the 2013–14 season and got a historic promotion to the Division 1 Féminine.

== History ==
ASPTT Albi were promoted for the first time in its history to a national division, the National 1B (Division 2), at the end of the 1999–2000 season, qualifying through its place behind the reserve team of Toulouse OAC (whose main team was then the double champion of Division 1), winning the Midi-Pyrénées Honor Division. For this first experience in National 1B, the club progressed in Pool B for the 2000–2001 season, playing alongside clubs such as OS Monaco, UFF Besançon, FCF Monteux and FCF Nord-Allier Yzeure. There are three pools of 10 clubs, depending on the location. It would be a difficult task ahead for the club, as they finished the season in last place in the group with a negative goal difference and with 3 wins, 4 draws and 11 defeats. Ironically, the team would become one of the few clubs to win (4 goals to 2) against the future winner of the pool and runner-up of Division 2, SCSC Caluire. However, the club was relegated to the regional divisions at the end of that season.

Back in the regional divisions, a new level, Division 3, is set up for the following season. The club finished in 5th place in Group E of interregional championship, unable to compete with the Toulouse FC reserves and Montpellier HSC. The club then struggled for three seasons in the Midi-Pyrénées Division d’Honneur. They then won the Midi-Pyrenees Cup in 2004 and finally gained promotion in the 2004–2005 season when, after being crowned the title of the DH Midi-Pyrénées, they finally got promotion to Division 3 national.

Early in the 2005 season, Stéphanie Caraven becomes player-coach of the first team (he retires in 2007) and remains in that position for seven seasons. The clubs only stayed for two seasons in Division 3, as they ended the 2005–2006 season in 6th place, in a year marked by an especially good run in the Challenge de France leading the team to the knockout stages, losing 1 goal to 0 by Claix FF (from Division 2), which to date is the best performance of the club in this competition. The following season, the club finished first in their group, ahead of regional rival, Rodez AF, and qualified for the second round. They again finished in the lead, in front of ASC Saint-Apollinaire, leading to a Division 3 final against AS Montigny. They lost 2 goals to 1, but were promoted to Division 2 again after the 2007–2008 season, 7 years after their first ascent.

The club quickly proved to be a team to be reckoned with in the fight for the promotion to Division 1. The team finished the 2007–2008 season in a very good place for a promoted club (4th in Group B). They ended up 6th the following season, 5th in 2010, 3rd in 2011 and second in 2012. At the end of the 2011–2012 season, Stephanie Caraven leaves, which resulted in worse result for the next season: 6th place.

In 2013, David Welferinger was appointed head coach. New players are brought in to reinforce the strength of the captain Julie Peruzzetto, like Stephanie Roche, Anaïs Arcambal from Toulouse and Solene Barbance from AS Muretaine. The chemistry between the new and old players set quickly and the team achieved a near perfect season in 2013–2014. In fact, the club won 20 games out of 22, with 17 consecutive victories and finishing first in their group ahead the FF Nîmes MG. They confirm their historic climb to Division 1 by winning 0–3 against CS Nivolas-Vermelle, and became the champion of Division 2 by winning on the last day – 6 June 2014 – their match against Puy Foot. This was the first title of champion of France of a club from Tarn in any sport.

To prepare for this first season in the top flight, the club was very busy in the transfer market, with no fewer than 10 arrivals and only 2 departures. The team made a good start to the season with victories including against the other two clubs promoted from Division 2, FF Issy and FC Metz.

== Players ==
Players and staff – 2024–25 season.

=== First-team squad ===
French teams are limited to four players without EU citizenship. Hence, the squad list includes only the principal nationality of each player; several non-European players on the squad have dual citizenship with an EU country. Also, players from the ACP countries—countries in Africa, the Caribbean, and the Pacific that are signatories to the Cotonou Agreement—are not counted against non-EU quotas due to the Kolpak ruling.

As of 4 October 2024,

Note: Flags indicate national team as defined under FIFA eligibility rules; some limited exceptions apply. Players may hold more than one non-FIFA nationality.

No.	Pos.	Nation	Player
1	GK	FRA	Solène Froger
3	DF	FRA	Loane Ballarin
4	DF	FRA	Éva Gosselin
6	MF	FRA	Fanny Pereira
7	MF	FRA	Fannie Da Cunha
8	FW	FRA	Kimberley Cazeau (captain)
9	FW	MAR	Nawelle Laoudihi
10	FW	FRA	Andréa Compper Banguillot
11	MF	FRA	Marine Coudon
12	DF	FRA	Laurie Bezombes

No.	Pos.	Nation	Player
14	DF	FRA	Louise Cid
15	DF	FRA	Flavie Mercier
16	GK	COM	Aïcha Said
19	FW	FRA	Carla Cosme
20	MF	FRA	Léa Crouzet
21	DF	FRA	Angéline Quentin
22	DF	FRA	Camille Collin-Rougier
23	FW	FRA	Julie Revelli
28	FW	FRA	Valentine Kirbach
33	FW	FRA	Alizée Conquet

== Ownership and team management ==
=== Presidents ===
- Bernard Espié

=== Head coaches ===
- FRA Stephanie Caraven (2005–2012)
- FRA Daniel Sutra (2012–2013)
- FRA David Welferinger (2013–2015)
- FRA Adolphe Ogouyon (2015–)
