= Toulouse FC (women) =

Women's association football club in France

Toulouse
- Nickname: Les Violettes
- Founded: 1980
- Ground: Terrain Brice Taton
- Capacity: 1,000
- Owner: RedBird Capital Partners (85%)
- League: Première Ligue
- 2025–26: Seconde Ligue, 1st of 12 (promoted)
- Website: www.toulousefc.com
Home colours

Toulouse FC Féminines is a French women's football club representing Toulouse FC. It currently competes in the Première Ligue. Founded in 1980 as Toulouse OAC, the team became a section of Toulouse FC in 2001, at its peak.

Toulouse OAC settled in the top positions of the French First Division in the second half of the 90s and soon became a powerhouse, winning four championships in a row between 1999 and 2002. It was the first team to achieve this since the league's unification in 1992. The latter was their most successful season, as they also won the national Cup and reached the semifinals of the UEFA Women's Cup after topping its group and beating Arsenal FC. The following year Toulouse was defeated by eventual champions Umeå IK in the quarterfinals.

However, Toulouse gradually declined in the following years and was relegated in 2011. It managed to climb back to the flight in the 2026–27 season.

== Players ==
=== Current squad ===
As of 20 September 2026

Note: Flags indicate national team as defined under FIFA eligibility rules; some limited exceptions apply. Players may hold more than one non-FIFA nationality.

No.	Pos.	Nation	Player
2	MF	FRA	Ludivine Bardet
3	DF	ITA	Azzurra Gallo
4	DF	FRA	Lou Jumere
5	DF	CIV	Mariam Diakité
6	FW	TUR	Selen Altunkulak
7	FW	SEN	Coumba Mbodji
8	MF	FRA	Tatiana Solanet
9	FW	AUS	Annalise Rasmussen
10	FW	POR	Luisa Oliveira Bras
11	FW	FRA	Julie Rabanne
14	DF	FRA	Pauline Pardon
15	DF	FRA	Chloé Tapia
17	MF	FRA	Alexandra Atamaniuk

No.	Pos.	Nation	Player
18	FW	FRA	Anna Conesa
20	MF	FRA	Lina Gay
21	FW	FRA	Mymithye Bironien
22	MF	FRA	Christy Gavory
23	FW	FRA	Chloé Marty
24	MF	FRA	Roma Grinfan
30	GK	FRA	Anaïs Priaulet
33	DF	BRA	Mayra Bento
34	DF	FRA	Fiona Bogi
47	FW	FRA	Valentine Gay
81	GK	FRA	Alyssa Fernandes
99	GK	TUR	Göknur Güleryüz

== Honours ==
League

- National 1A / Division 1 Féminine
  - Winners (4): 1998–99, 1999–2000, 2000–01, 2001–02
  - Runners-up (2): 1994–95, 1996–97
- National 1B / Division 2 Féminine
  - Winners (2): 1993–94, 2011–12
- Division 3 Féminine
  - Winners (1): 2023–24
- LFO Regional 1 Féminin
  - Winners (1): 2021–22

Cups

- Challenge de France / Coupe de France féminine
  - Winners (1): 2001–02

== Seasons ==
Results of league and cup competitions by season
Season	League									CdF	UEFA	Top goalscorer(s)	
Season	Division	Pld	W	D	L	GF	GA	Diff	Pos	CdF	UEFA	Name(s)	Goals
As Toulouse Olympique Aérospatiale Club
1982–83	Div 1 (Gr. C) ↓								6th (Note: Toulouse Olympique Aérospatiale Club were administratively relegated due to financial issues.)				
1983–84	Div d'H ↑												
1984–85	Div 2 (Gr. A) ↓								3rd				
1985–86	Div d'H												
1986–87	Div d'H												
1987–88	Div d'H ↑												
1988–89	Div 1 (Gr. B)	18	5	2	11	17	33	–16	7th				
1989–90	Div 1 (Gr. A)	16	3	6	7	17	30	–16	6th				
1990–91	Div 1 (Gr. A)	18	6	1	11	23	39	–16	8th				
1991–92	Div 1 (Gr. B)	18	10	3	5	34	21	+13	4th				
1992–93	Nat 1A ↓	22	5	6	11	25	39	–14	10th				
1993–94	Nat 1B (Gr. B) ↑	18	15	3	0	69	10	+59	1st				
1994–95	Nat 1A	22	14	4	4	55	21	+34	2nd				
1995–96	Nat 1A	22	12	6	4	52	24	+28	3rd				
1996–97	Nat 1A	22	16	2	4	66	16	+50	2nd				
1997–98	Nat 1A	22	17	1	4	69	23	+46	3rd				
1998–99	Nat 1A	22	20	1	1	76	14	+62	1st				
1999–2000	Nat 1A	25	21	2	2	92	18	+74	1st				
2000–01	Nat 1A	25	19	5	1	68	17	+51	1st				
As Toulouse Football Club
2001–02	Nat 1A	25	18	4	3	80	14	+66	1st	W	SF	Mélanie Briche	14
2002–03	Div 1	25	18	2	5	50	15	+35	4th	QF	QF	Sandrine Rouquet	13
2003–04	Div 1	25	17	4	4	58	17	+41	4th	SF		Lilas Traïkia	14
2004–05	Div 1	22	11	4	7	44	32	+12	5th	R16		Lilas Traïkia	9
2005–06	Div 1	22	11	4	7	38	18	+20	4th	SF		Lilas Traïkia	12
2006–07	Div 1	22	7	3	12	30	41	–11	8th	R16		Marie-Pierre Castera Julie Peruzzetto	8
2007–08	Div 1	22	8	2	12	26	46	–20	8th	R32		Marie-Pierre Castera	8
2008–09	Div 1	22	7	5	10	34	46	–12	9th	R16		Fanny Tenret	12
2009–10	Div 1	22	6	4	12	25	50	–25	8th	R32		Marie-Pierre Castera	6
2010–11	Div 1 ↓	22	4	4	14	19	50	–31	11th	R16		Delphine Chatelin Sidonie Demarle Virginie Dessalle	3
2011–12	Div 2 (Gr. C) ↑	22	19	2	1	89	20	+69	1st	QF		Sandra Maurice	28
2012–13	Div 1 ↓	22	1	4	17	17	81	–64	12th	R16		Lilas Traïkia	6
2013–14	Div 2 (Gr. C)	22	11	4	7	63	44	+19	5th	R64		Valérie Gauvin	32
2014–15	Div 2 (Gr. C)	22	12	4	6	54	24	+30	4th	1R		Marie-Pierre Castera	23
2015–16	Div 2 (Gr. C)	22	15	1	6	60	25	+30	3rd	R64		Marie-Pierre Castera	22
2016–17	Div 2 (Gr. B)	22	13	5	4	46	19	+27	4th	R32		Marie-Pierre Castera	18
2017–18	Div 2 (Gr. B)	22	11	5	6	43	27	+16	5th	R16		Marie-Pierre Castera	9
2018–19	Div 2 (Gr. B) ↓	24	6	5	13	21	32	–15	10th	R64		Mama Diop Marine Garcia	6
2019–20	Reg 1									1R			
2020–21	Reg 1									— (Note: The 2020–21 Coupe de France féminine was truncated to involve only D1F and D2F teams – and later cancelled altogether – as a result of the COVID-19 pandemic in France.)			
2021–22	Reg 1 ↑	18	18	0	0				1st	R32			
2022–23	Div 2 (Gr. B) ↓	22	7	4	11	39	38	+1	8th	R32		Selen Altunkulak	20
2023–24	Div 3 (Gr. B) ↑	22	19	1	2	94	20	+74	1st	R32		Selen Altunkulak	33

== See also ==
- List of football clubs in France
- List of French women's football champions
