= Lille OSC (women) =

- Full name: Lille Olympique Sporting Club
- Nicknames: LOSC, Lille, Lille OSC, Les Drogues, Les Nordistes, Les Lilloises
- Founded: 23 Jul 2005
- Ground: Annexed Stadium at Stadium Lille Métropole, Villeneuve-d'Ascq
- President: Olivier Létang
- Manager: Mathieu Robail
- League: Seconde Ligue
- 2025–26: Seconde Ligue, 6th of 12
- Website: http://www.losc.fr/

Lille OSC (Lille Olympique Sporting Club) is a French women's football club based in Villeneuve-d'Ascq. The club is the female section of Ligue 1 men's club Lille OSC. The club was founded in 2005. Since 2017, they currently play in the Seconde Ligue, the second-highest division of women's football in France.

== History ==
The club was formally founded in 2005 after an agreement between FF Templemars-Vendeville and Lille OSC. The team played several years in Division 2 Féminine until 2017, when LOSC won the D2 championships and was then promoted to Division 1 Féminine. At the end of their first D1 season, the team achieved 6th place.

== Players ==
As of 26 September 2025

=== First team squad ===
Note: Flags indicate national team as defined under FIFA eligibility rules; some limited exceptions apply. Players may hold more than one non-FIFA nationality.

No.	Pos.	Nation	Player
1	GK	FRA	Elina Dewaele
2	DF	FRA	Céleste Delcroix
3	DF	FRA	Louna Belhout-Achi
5	DF	FRA	Célia Delaby
6	MF	FRA	Éléa Dufourmont
7	FW	FRA	Pauline Haugou
8	MF	FRA	Déborah Piette
9	FW	BEL	Véronique Zang Bikoula
10	FW	UKR	Inna Hlushchenko
11	MF	FRA	Éléna Da Rocha
12	FW	HAI	Joséphine Vanuxeem
13	MF	FRA	Jamila Hamidou
16	GK	FRA	Clara Degor

No.	Pos.	Nation	Player
17	DF	ALG	Elmira Djaraoui
18	FW	FRA	Anna Conesa
19	MF	FRA	Claire Lelarge (Captain)
20	MF	FRA	Valéryane Policnik
22	DF	MAR	Nesryne El Chad
23	DF	USA	Megan Rucker
25	DF	FRA	Perrine Ruffelaere
26	MF	FRA	Sifra Dulder
27	DF	CZE	Jana Janečka
28	DF	FRA	Messina Fouda Ahmadou
29	FW	FRA	Tania Bonomo
30	GK	CAN	Taylor Beitz
40	GK	FRA	Maëlle Bonnel

=== Under-19 team squad ===
Note: Flags indicate national team as defined under FIFA eligibility rules; some limited exceptions apply. Players may hold more than one non-FIFA nationality.

No.	Pos.	Nation	Player
—	GK	FRA	Elina Dewaele
—	GK	FRA	Lili Roques
—	DF	FRA	Lola Malfait
—	FW	FRA	Sarah Djaraoui
—	FW	FRA	Eloïse Deschepper
—	DF	FRA	Lana Alouani
—	DF	MAR	Safa Chajari
—	MF	FRA	Élise Dhalluin
—	DF	BEL	Josephine Van den Broecke
—	MF	FRA	Éléna Da Rocha
—	FW	FRA	Lili Normand
—	FW	FRA	Noeline Lutyn
—	FW	FRA	Tania Bonomo
—	MF	FRA	Melyna Berrehal

No.	Pos.	Nation	Player
—	MF	FRA	Heidi Truchon-Mendy
—	FW	FRA	Kayna Guerraichi
—	DF	FRA	Félicité Boutillier
—	DF	FRA	Laure-Marie Wairy
—	DF	FRA	Messina Fouda Ahmadou
—	DF	FRA	Ophélie Bondeau
—	GK	FRA	Louna Toso
—	GK	FRA	Claire Tomowiak
—	MF	BEL	Romane Catteeuw
—	MF	FRA	Mathéa Pichot
—	DF	FRA	Cassiane Hidden
—	FW	FRA	Tasnim Baghouz
—	FW	FRA	Emma Khiari
—	MF	FRA	Noor Bougtab
