= FC Metz (women) =

FC Metz (Women)
- Full name: Football Club de Metz Section Féminine
- Founded: 1999; 27 years ago
- Ground: Stade Dezavelle
- Capacity: 1,500
- President: Bernard Serin
- Manager: Marine Morel
- League: Seconde Ligue
- 2025–26: Seconde Ligue, 10th of 12
- Website: www.fcmetz.com/feminines
Home colours	Away colours	Third colours

FC Metz Feminines (commonly known as FC Metz or Metz) is a French football club based in Metz, Lorraine which plays in the Seconde Ligue. The club is the women's side of the French football club of the same name and was founded in 1974.

FC Metz plays its home matches at the Stade du Batzenthal 1 in Algrange which has a capacity of 2,500 spectators. They are coached by David Fanzel.

== Players ==
=== Current squad ===
As of 1 September 2024

Sources: Official website, footofeminin.fr, soccerway.com and Le Répbublican Lorrain, Note: Flags indicate national team as defined under FIFA eligibility rules; some limited exceptions apply. Players may hold more than one non-FIFA nationality.

No.	Pos.	Nation	Player
1	GK	FRA	Julie Genty
2	DF	FRA	Anaïs Lambert
4	DF	POR	Clara Moreira (captain)
6	MF	FRA	Léa Munier
7	MF	FRA	Leina Feddaoui
8	FW	SEN	Seynabou Mbengue
9	FW	FRA	Amélie Joseph
11	FW	ALG	Mélissa Bethi
12	FW	FRA	Kady Coulibaly
10	MF	FRA	Lina Thivillon
14	FW	ALG	Inès Boutaleb
17	DF	ALG	Lisa Jacob

No.	Pos.	Nation	Player
16	GK	FRA	Gillian Nottelet
20	MF	FRA	Justine Rougemont
21	DF	FRA	Clara Petitjean
24	MF	FRA	Inès Ou Mahi
10	FW	POR	Luisa Oliveira Brás
26	DF	FRA	Maud Antoine
30	GK	ALG	Célia Remili
32	MF	MAR	Maria Fodil
33	MF	POR	Manon Magalhaes
34	DF	ITA	Kaylia Rosan
31	MF	FRA	Assia Djebli
27	FW	FRA	Assia Bouktit
