= Division 3 Féminine =

- Organising body: French Football Federation
- Founded: 2002; 24 years ago
- Country: France
- Confederation: UEFA
- Number of clubs: 24
- Level on pyramid: 3
- Promotion to: D2 Féminine
- Relegation to: Régional 1 Féminine
- Domestic cup(s): Coupe de France Féminine; Trophée des Championnes
- Website: Website
- Current: 2025–26 Division 3 Féminine

The Division 3 Féminine, shortened as D3 Féminine, is the third division of women's football in France. Run by the French Football Federation, the league is contested by twenty four fully professional clubs into two groups.

== Clubs ==
2025–26 Division 3 Féminine GROUP A
Team	2024–25	Location
Molsheim Ernolsheim	Winner of Accession phase to D3 Féminine	Molsheim
US Orléans	11th (D2)	Orléans
Bourges Foot 18	2nd	Bourges
Football Club Lorient 56	Winner of Accession phase to D3 Féminine	Lorient
Stade Malherbe Caen	9th	Caen
ESOF Vendée La Roche-sur-Yon	4th	La Roche-sur-Yon
VGA Saint-Maur	Winner of Accession phase to D3 Féminine	Saint-Maur-des-Fossés
US Quevilly-Rouen Métropole	7th	Le Petit-Quevilly
CPB Bréquigny Rennes	6th	Rennes
Orvault Sports Football	Winner of Accession phase to D3 Féminine	Orvault
RC Roubaix Wervicq	3rd	Wervicq-Sud
Racing Club Saint-Denis	8th	Saint-Denis, Seine-Saint-Denis
AAS Sarcelles	5th	Sarcelles

2024–25 Division 3 Féminine GROUP B
Team	2024–25	Location
ASPTT Albi	3rd	Albi
AS Cannes	5th	Cannes
Association Sportive Châtenoy-le-Royal	Winner of Accession phase to D3 Féminine	Châtenoy-le-Royal
Bordeaux	Winner of Accession phase to D3 Féminine	Bordeaux
Clermont Foot	2nd	Clermont-Ferrand
ALC Longvic	10th Group A	Longvic
Le Puy Foot 43 Auvergne	6th	Le Puy-en-Velay
AS Monaco FC	7th	Monaco
Olympique Lyonnais B	4th	Lyon
Montauban FCTG	9th	Montauban
Montpellier HSC B	8th	Montpellier
FC Rousset Sainte-Victoire	Winner of Accession phase to D3 Féminine	Rousset
