= 2026 Women's Africa Cup of Nations =

2026 edition of the Women's Africa Cup of Nations

كأس الأمم الإفريقية للسيدات 2026 Coupe d'Afrique des nations féminine 2026

Tournament details
- Host country: Morocco
- Dates: 26 July – 16 August
- Teams: 16 (from 1 confederation)
- Venues: 4 (in 3 host cities)

Final positions
- Champions: Cameroon (1st title)
- Runners-up: Malawi
- Third place: Algeria
- Fourth place: Morocco

Tournament statistics
- Matches played: 34
- Goals scored: 96 (2.82 per match)
- Top scorer(s): (Cameroon) Marie Ngah Manga (Malawi) Temwa Chaŵinga (Zambia) Barbra Banda (5 goals each)
- Best player: (Cameroon) Monique Ngock
- Best goalkeeper: (Cameroon) Michaely Bihina
- Fair play award: Algeria

The 2026 Women's Africa Cup of Nations, commonly referred to as WAFCON 2026, was the 14th edition (16th if editions of the tournament without hosts are included) of the Women's Africa Cup of Nations, the biennial international football championship organised by Confederation of African Football for the women's national teams of Africa.

The tournament was played in Morocco for the third consecutive edition becoming the first country to achieve this feat. Venues in Casablanca, Fez and Rabat were used for the tournament.

Despite originally being planned to be a 12 team tournament, CAF decided to expand the tournament to 16 teams after qualification ended. Qualification took place between February and October 2025 to decide who qualified, while hosts Morocco qualified automatically. Cape Verde and Malawi both made their debuts.

The tournament also doubled as the African qualifiers for the 2027 FIFA Women's World Cup in Brazil. The top four teams qualified for the World Cup, while two more teams advanced to the inter-confederation play-offs.

Nigeria were the defending champions, having beaten Morocco 3–2 in the 2024 final in Rabat. They failed to defend the title after losing 1–0 to eventual champions Cameroon in the quarter-finals. Nigeria, who had their worst ever WAFCON after failing to make the semi-finals for the first time ever, also failed to qualify for the FIFA Women's World Cup for the first time in their history. Cameroon won their first title, and became only the fourth team to win the tournament, after beating debutants Malawi in the final.

== Host selection ==
- Morocco – Morocco expressed an interest in hosting the tournament after organizing the previous two tournaments in 2022 and 2024.
- Tanzania – In November 2022, Tanzania Football Federation president, Wallace Karia, stated they could host the tournament, with venues in Mbeya, Arusha, Tanga, Tabora, Dodoma and Mwanza being touted as possible venues. This would have been Tanzania's first time hosting and first time the event was held in East Africa.

On 17 October 2024, Morocco were confirmed as hosts for the third consecutive time, becoming the first country to host three editions in a row and the third overall to host the tournament three times, alongside South Africa and Nigeria.

=== Hosting problems ===
The South Africa Deputy Minister of Sports, Arts and Culture, Bertha Peace Mabe, announced on 1 February 2026 that they would host after Morocco withdrew as hosts. However, the South Africa Minister of Sports, Arts and Culture, Gayton McKenzie, refuted the claim two days later, stating that Peace Mabe had been misunderstood, that Morocco remained the host, and that South Africa had indicated a willingness to host if necessary. On 13 February 2026, CAF president, Patrice Motsepe, reaffirmed that Morocco were still the hosts due to the fact that the other nations interested in hosting wanted to change the dates, which the federation strongly opposed. On 5 March 2026, the CAF announced the tournament was postponed to 25 July – 16 August 2026.

== Qualification ==
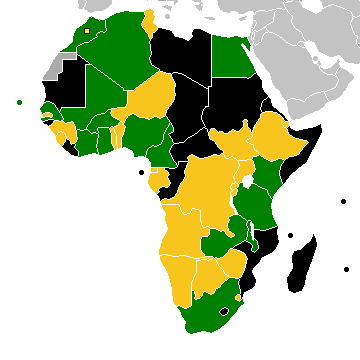
Qualified Did not qualify Did not enter or withdrew Not part of CAF

A total of 39 CAF member nations entered the competition. With hosts Morocco automatically qualified, the remaining 38 teams contested two qualifying rounds to decide the other 11 places in the final tournament. Chad, who were set to make their debut in WAFCON qualifying, withdrew before the first round due to financial difficulties. Congo withdrew prior to the first leg of the first round due to a lack of competitions and preparation.

In early October 2025, ahead of the second and final round of qualification, reports emerged suggesting that the tournament would be expanded to 16 teams, though no details were provided regarding potential format changes. However, on 25 October, the Confederation of African Football (CAF) dismissed these claims, clarifying that the qualification process would determine 11 teams to join the hosts. Subsequent reports indicated that CAF was nonetheless considering expansion. On 3 November 2025, CAF officially confirmed the expansion from 12 to 16 teams. As the qualification phase for the tournament had already concluded, the four highest-ranked teams based on the FIFA Women's World Ranking of 7 August 2025, among those eliminated in the final qualifying round were selected to complete the list of 16 participating nations.

Of the 16 qualified teams, 9 had taken part in the 2024 edition, while Botswana, DR Congo and Tunisia missed out, having qualified in 2024. Cape Verde and Malawi both made their first appearance in the final tournament.

=== Qualified teams ===
Order	Team	Qualification method	Date of qualification	Appearance(s)				Previous best performance (Note: Bold text indicates they hosted that edition.)	WR
Order	Team	Qualification method	Date of qualification	Total	First	Last	Streak	Previous best performance	WR
1	Morocco	Hosts	17 October 2024	5th	1998	2024	3	Runners-up (**2022**, **2024**)	66
2	Zambia	Second round winners	26 October 2025	5th	2014	2024	4	Third place (2022)	64
3	Tanzania	Second round winners	28 October 2025	3rd	2010	2024	2	Group stage (2010, 2024)	121
4	Malawi	Second round winners	28 October 2025	1st	Debut				153
5	Algeria	Second round winners	28 October 2025	7th	2004	2024	2	Quarter-finals (2024)	73
6	Nigeria	Second round winners	28 October 2025	14th	1998	2024	14	**Champions** (Ten times) (Note: Nigeria has won in 1998, 2000, 2002, 2004, 2006, 2010, 2014, 2016, 2018 and 2024.)	37
7	Ghana	Second round winners	28 October 2025	12th	1998	2024	2	Runners-up (1998, 2002, 2006)	62
8	Burkina Faso	Second round winners	28 October 2025	2nd	2022		1	Group stage (2022)	118
9	Kenya	Second round winners	28 October 2025	2nd	2016		1	Group stage (2016)	133
10	South Africa	Second round winners	28 October 2025	14th	1998	2024	14	**Champions** (2022)	55
11	Cape Verde	Second round winners	28 October 2025	1st	Debut				119
12	Senegal	Second round winners	28 October 2025	4th	2012	2024	3	Quarter-finals (2022, 2024)	81
13	Cameroon	Second round best four losers based on the FIFA Women's World Ranking (of 7 August 2025)	3 November 2025	13th	1998	2022	1	Runners-up (2004, 2014, **2016**)	70
14	Ivory Coast	Second round best four losers based on the FIFA Women's World Ranking (of 7 August 2025)	3 November 2025	3rd	2012	2014	1	Third place (2014)	72
15	Mali	Second round best four losers based on the FIFA Women's World Ranking (of 7 August 2025)	3 November 2025	9th	2002	2024	2	Fourth place (2018)	85
16	Egypt	Second round best four losers based on the FIFA Women's World Ranking (of 7 August 2025)	3 November 2025	3rd	1998	2016	1	Group stage (1998, 2016)	101

== Venues ==
During the draw on 15 January 2026, it was announced that two stadiums in Rabat alongside Casablanca and Fez, were the three cities chosen to host the competition. The Fez Stadium and both stadiums in Rabat hosted the recently concluded 2025 Africa Cup of Nations. The Larbi Zaouli Stadium in Casablanca was the only venue to have previous experience in hosting the women's edition, having been used in 2024.

In June 2026, CAF released the full fixture list in which Fez was no longer indicated as hosting any matches and listed the following venues in Rabat and Casablanca:

Location of the host cities of the 2026 WAFCON
1 Casablanca
2 Rabat

2026 Women's Africa Cup of Nations venues
Rabat		Casablanca
Moulay El Hassan Stadium	Al Medina Stadium	Larbi Zaouli Stadium
Capacity: 23,000	Capacity: 18,000	Capacity: 18,600
Rabat Olympic Stadium		Moulay Rachid Stadium
Capacity: 21,000		Capacity: 5,000

== Match officials ==
On 18 July 2026, CAF announced the selected match officials for the tournament.

=== Referees ===
- (Burkina Faso) Awa Ilboudo
- (Cameroon) Aline Guimbang Etong
- (Cameroon) Innocentia Ntangti
- (Egypt) Shahenda El Maghrabi
- (Guinea) Aïssatou Kanté
- (Kenya) Josephine Wanjiku
- (Mauritania) Yacine Samassa
- (Morocco) Zouleikha Harmasse
- (Morocco) Zakia El Grini
- (Namibia) Antsino Twanyanyukwa
- (Nigeria) Yemisi Akintoye
- (Democratic Republic of the Congo) Rachel Zihindula
- (Rwanda) Aline Umutoni
- (Sierra Leone) Aminata Fullah
- (South Africa) Akhona Makalima
- (Togo) Vincentia Amédomé
- (Uganda) Shamirah Nabadda

=== Assistant Referees ===
- (Algeria) Asma Ouahab
- (Benin) Nafissatou Yekini
- (Burundi) Fidès Bangurambona
- (Cameroon) Carine Atezambong
- (Chad) Victorine Ngarassoum
- (Egypt) Yara Atef
- (Guinea) M'mahawa Kourouma
- (Kenya) Elizabeth Njoroge
- (Mali) Fanta Koné
- (Mauritania) Mariem Chedad
- (Mauritius) Queency Victoire
- (Morocco) Soukaina Hamdi
- (Morocco) Ihssane En-Nouajeli
- (Niger) Sakina Hamidou Alfa
- (Democratic Republic of the Congo) Mireille Kanjinga
- (Democratic Republic of the Congo) Elaeis Tomakwiza
- (Rwanda) Alice Umutesi
- (Senegal) Tabara Mbodj
- (South Africa) Maneo Tau
- (Tunisia) Houda Afine
- (Zambia) Diana Chikotesha
- (Zambia) Nancy Kasitu

=== Video Match Officials (VMOs) ===
- (Algeria) Lahlou Benbraham
- (Egypt) Hossam Haggag
- (Eswatini) Letticia Viana
- (Kenya) Peter Waweru
- (Malawi) Eness Gumbo
- (Mauritius) Maria Rivet
- (Morocco) Zakaria Bouchtaoui
- (Niger) Sadou Ali Brahamou
- (Rwanda) Salima Mukansanga
- (Senegal) Issa Sy
- (Sudan) Abdalaziz Yasir
- (Tunisia) Dorsaf Ganouati
- (Zambia) Lumbizai Musawa
- (Zimbabwe) Brighton Chimene

== Draw ==
The final draw was held at the Prince Moulay Abdellah Sports Complex in Rabat on 15 January 2026. The 16 qualified teams were seeded into four pots based on the FIFA Women's World Ranking from 11 December 2025, noted in parentheses. Host nation Morocco was automatically assigned position A1, while defending champions Nigeria occupied position C1.

Pot 1	Pot 2	Pot 3	Pot 4
1. Morocco (66) (hosts); 2. Nigeria (37) (title holders); 3. South Africa (55); 4. Ghana (62)	5. Zambia (64); 6. Cameroon (70); 7. Ivory Coast (72); 8. Algeria (73)	9. Senegal (81); 10. Mali (85); 11. Egypt (101); 12. Burkina Faso (118)	13. Cape Verde (119); 14. Tanzania (121); 15. Kenya (133); 16. Malawi (153)

== Group stage ==
The top two teams of each group advanced to the quarter-finals.

=== Tiebreakers ===
Teams were ranked according to points (3 points for a win, 1 point for a draw, 0 points for a loss).

If teams were tied on points, the following tiebreaking criteria were applied, in the order given, to determine the rankings (Regulations Article 74):

1. Points in matches among the tied teams;
2. Goal difference in matches among the tied teams;
3. Goals scored in matches among the tied teams;
4. If after applying all criteria above, two teams were still tied, the above criteria were applied only to matches played between the two teams in question. If this does not resolve the tie, the next three criteria were applied;
5. Goal difference in all group matches;
6. Goals scored in all group matches;
7. Drawing of lots.

=== Group A ===
Pos	Team	Pld	W	D	L	GF	GA	GD	Pts	Qualification
1	Morocco (H)	3	2	1	0	5	0	+5	7	Advance to knockout stage
2	Algeria	3	2	0	1	4	1	+3	6	Advance to knockout stage
3	Senegal	3	1	1	1	1	2	−1	4	
4	Kenya	3	0	0	3	0	7	−7	0	

Source: CAF
Rules for classification: Tiebreakers
(H) Hosts
26 July 2026
18:00

Algeria	2–0	Senegal
Dafeur 42' (pen.); Bethi 88'	Report (FIFA)

Rabat Olympic Stadium, Rabat
Referee: Akhona Makalima (South Africa)
26 July 2026
21:00

Morocco	4–0	Kenya
Ouzraoui 19'; Atiq 29'; Jraïdi 32', 47'	Report (FIFA)

Moulay El Hassan Stadium, Rabat
Referee: Vincentia Amedome (Togo)

30 July 2026
18:00

Senegal	1–0	Kenya
Mbengue 35'	Report (FIFA)

Rabat Olympic Stadium, Rabat
Referee: Yemisi Akintoye (Nigeria)
30 July 2026
21:00

Morocco	1–0	Algeria
Mssoudy 84'	Report (FIFA)

Moulay El Hassan Stadium, Rabat
Referee: Aline Guimbang Etong (Cameroon)

3 August 2026
21:00

Senegal	0–0	Morocco
	Report (FIFA)

Moulay El Hassan Stadium, Rabat
Referee: Shamirah Nabadda (Uganda)
3 August 2026
21:00

Kenya	0–2	Algeria
	Report (FIFA)	Dafeur 14'; Bendris 23'

Rabat Olympic Stadium, Rabat
Referee: Aïssatou Kanté (Guinea)

=== Group B ===
Pos	Team	Pld	W	D	L	GF	GA	GD	Pts	Qualification
1	Ivory Coast	3	2	1	0	8	4	+4	7	Advance to knockout stage
2	South Africa	3	1	1	1	4	4	0	4	Advance to knockout stage
3	Burkina Faso	3	1	0	2	3	6	−3	3 (Note: Head-to-head result: Burkina Faso 2–1 Tanzania)	
4	Tanzania	3	1	0	2	4	5	−1	3	

Source: CAF
Rules for classification: Tiebreakers
Notes:
27 July 2026
18:00

South Africa	1–2	Tanzania
Mbane 45+2'	Report (FIFA)	Msewa 37'; Ubamba 87'

Moulay Rachid Stadium, Casablanca
Referee: Shahenda El Maghrabi (Egypt)
27 July 2026
21:00

Ivory Coast	4–1	Burkina Faso
Elloh 7' (pen.); Konan 16', 23'; Ouédraogo 56'	Report (FIFA)	Congo 60'

Larbi Zaouli Stadium, Casablanca
Referee: Josephine Wanjiku (Kenya)

31 July 2026
18:00

South Africa	2–2	Ivory Coast
Kgatlana 71'; Magaia 90+9'	Report (FIFA)	Sery 18', 36'

Moulay Rachid Stadium, Casablanca
Referee: Rachel Zihindula (DR Congo)
31 July 2026
21:00

Burkina Faso	2–1	Tanzania
Kabré 43'; B. Sawadogo 80'	Report (FIFA)	Mnunka 62'

Larbi Zaouli Stadium, Casablanca
Referee: Yacine Samassa (Mauritania)

4 August 2026
21:00

Burkina Faso	0–1	South Africa
	Report (FIFA)	Kgatlana 21'

Moulay Rachid Stadium, Casablanca
Referee: Aline Guimbang Etong (Cameroon)
4 August 2026
21:00

Tanzania	1–2	Ivory Coast
Msewa 90+9' (pen.)	Report (FIFA)	Ouédraogo 44'; Konan 68' (pen.)

Larbi Zaouli Stadium, Casablanca
Referee: Antsino Twanyanyukwa (Namibia)

=== Group C ===
Pos	Team	Pld	W	D	L	GF	GA	GD	Pts	Qualification
1	Malawi	3	2	0	1	7	5	+2	6 (Note: Tied on points. Goals scored in head-to-head matches were used as the tiebreaker; Malawi 4, Nigeria 3 and Zambia 2.)	Advance to knockout stage
2	Nigeria	3	2	0	1	9	5	+4	6	Advance to knockout stage
3	Zambia	3	2	0	1	8	2	+6	6	
4	Egypt	3	0	0	3	3	15	−12	0	

Source: CAF
Rules for classification: Tiebreakers
Notes:
28 July 2026
18:00

Zambia	6–0	Egypt
Nachula 25' (pen.); B. Banda 60' (pen.), 63', 87', 90+6'; Phiri 90+2'	Report (FIFA)

Rabat Olympic Stadium, Rabat
Referee: Shamirah Nabadda (Uganda)
28 July 2026
21:00

Nigeria	2–3	Malawi
Ajibade 90+2' (pen.); Kanu 90+9'	Report (FIFA)	Te. Chaŵinga 73', 90+5'; Ta. Chaŵinga 79'

Al Medina Stadium, Rabat
Referee: Aline Umutoni (Rwanda)

1 August 2026
18:00

Egypt	1–3	Malawi
Hassan 71'	Report (FIFA)	Kadzere 35'; Chinzimu 45+2'; Te. Chaŵinga 68'

Moulay El Hassan Stadium, Rabat
Referee: Awa Ilboudo (Burkina Faso)
1 August 2026
21:00

Nigeria	1–0	Zambia
Oshoala 8'	Report (FIFA)

Al Medina Stadium, Rabat
Referee: Josephine Wanjiku (Kenya)

5 August 2026
21:00

Egypt	2–6	Nigeria
Ghazi 45+10' (pen.), 84'	Report (FIFA)	Oshoala 21' (pen.); Monday 45+2'; Kanu 57'; Ucheibe 81' (pen.); Ajibade 90+1' (pen.); Omewa 90+9'

Rabat Olympic Stadium, Rabat
Referee: Aline Umutoni (Rwanda)
5 August 2026
21:00

Malawi	1–2	Zambia
Ta. Chaŵinga 72'	Report (FIFA)	B. Banda 2'; Chilufya 37'

Al Medina Stadium, Rabat
Referee: Vincentia Amedome (Togo)

=== Group D ===
Pos	Team	Pld	W	D	L	GF	GA	GD	Pts	Qualification
1	Cameroon	3	2	1	0	4	2	+2	7	Advance to knockout stage
2	Ghana	3	1	1	1	3	2	+1	4	Advance to knockout stage
3	Mali	3	1	1	1	5	5	0	4	
4	Cape Verde	3	0	1	2	3	6	−3	1	

Source: CAF
Rules for classification: Tiebreakers
29 July 2026
18:00

Ghana	2–0	Cape Verde
Boaduwaa 6'; Vieira 54' (o.g.)	Report (FIFA)

Moulay Rachid Stadium, Casablanca
Referee: Zouleikha Harmasse (Morocco)
29 July 2026
21:00

Cameroon	2–1	Mali
Ngah Manga 14', 73' (pen.)	Report (FIFA)	A. Traoré 30' (pen.)

Larbi Zaouli Stadium, Casablanca
Referee: Antsino Twanyanyukwa (Namibia)

2 August 2026
18:00

Ghana	0–1	Cameroon
	Report (FIFA)	Ngah Manga 19' (pen.)

Moulay Rachid Stadium, Casablanca
Referee: Shahenda El Maghrabi (Egypt)
2 August 2026
21:00

Mali	3–2	Cape Verde
Kone 29'; F. Niakaté 50'; F. Diarra 79'	Report (FIFA)	Pereira 36'; Kelly 88'

Larbi Zaouli Stadium, Casablanca
Referee: Aminata Fullah (Sierra Leone)

6 August 2026
21:00

Mali	1–1	Ghana
Diabaté 50'	Report (FIFA)	Badu 45+3'

Moulay Rachid Stadium, Casablanca
Referee: Akhona Makalima (South Africa)
6 August 2026
21:00

Cape Verde	1–1	Cameroon
Moreira 50'	Report (FIFA)	Mendoua 28'

Larbi Zaouli Stadium, Casablanca
Referee: Zakia El Grini (Morocco)

== Knockout stage ==
The winners of each quarter-final qualified directly for the 2027 Women's World Cup, while the losers competed in play-in matches to determine the two African representatives in the inter-confederation play-offs.

=== Bracket ===
Quarter-finals
8 August 2026
Morocco	2
South Africa	1
9 August 2026
Cameroon	1
Nigeria	0
8 August 2026
Ivory Coast	1
Algeria	2
9 August 2026
Malawi	2
Ghana	1

Semi-finals
12 August 2026
Morocco	0 (1)
Cameroon (p)	0 (3)
12 August 2026
Algeria	1
Malawi	3

Final
16 August 2026
Cameroon	3
Malawi	0
Third place
15 August 2026
Morocco	1 (2)
Algeria	1 (3)

Play-in matches for inter-confederation play-offs 13 August 2026
South Africa	2
Nigeria	1
13 August 2026
Ivory Coast	1
Ghana	2

=== Quarter-finals ===
The winners qualified for the 2027 FIFA Women's World Cup.

8 August 2026
18:00

Ivory Coast	1–2	Algeria
Konan 29'	Report (FIFA)	Khiri 58'; Ould Braham 64'

Moulay Rachid Stadium, Casablanca
Referee: Shamirah Nabadda (Uganda)

8 August 2026
21:00

Morocco	2–1	South Africa
Ouzraoui 31'; Aït El Haj 51' (pen.)	Report (FIFA)	Kgatlana 67'

Moulay El Hassan Stadium, Rabat
Referee: Josephine Wanjiku (Kenya)

9 August 2026
18:00

Cameroon	1–0	Nigeria
Nyadjou 19'	Report (FIFA)

Larbi Zaouli Stadium, Casablanca
Referee: Antsino Twanyanyukwa (Namibia)

9 August 2026
21:00

Malawi	2–1	Ghana
Te. Chaŵinga 12'; Kadzere 79'	Report (FIFA)	Boye-Hlorkah 7'

Al Medina Stadium, Rabat
Referee: Shahenda El Maghrabi (Egypt)

=== Semi-finals ===
12 August 2026
18:00

Algeria	1–3	Malawi
Adjabi 60'	Report (FIFA)	Ta. Chaŵinga 33', 76'; Te. Chaŵinga 45+1'

Rabat Olympic Stadium, Rabat
Referee: Eunice Akintoye (Nigeria)

12 August 2026
21:00

Morocco	0–0 (a.e.t.)	Cameroon
	Report (FIFA)
Penalties
Aït El Haj (penalty scored); Chapelle (penalty missed); Atiq (penalty missed); Ouzraoui (penalty missed)	1–3	(penalty scored) Ngah Manga; (penalty missed) Mendoua; (penalty scored) Rose; (penalty scored) Nyadjou

Moulay El Hassan Stadium, Rabat
Referee: Vincentia Amedome (Togo)

=== Play-in matches ===
The winners advanced to the inter-confederation play-offs.

13 August 2026
18:00

Ivory Coast	1–2	Ghana
Konan 4' (pen.)	Report (FIFA)	Marfo 59'; Bonsu 72' (pen.)

Larbi Zaouli Stadium, Casablanca
Referee: Akhona Makalima (South Africa)

13 August 2026
21:00

South Africa	2–1	Nigeria
Kgatlana 56'; Jane 77'	Report (FIFA)	Ucheibe 90+3' (pen.)

Moulay Rachid Stadium, Casablanca
Referee: Aline Guimbang A Etong (Cameroon)

=== Third place ===
15 August 2026
18:00

Morocco	1–1	Algeria
Azraf 37'	Report (FIFA)	Boussaha 83'
Penalties
Redouani (penalty missed); Nakkach (penalty scored); Boutiebi (penalty scored); Mourtaji (penalty missed); Badri (penalty missed)	2–3	(penalty scored) Dafeur; (penalty missed) Braham; (penalty scored) Bekhaled; (penalty missed) Khezami; (penalty scored) Belloumou

Rabat Olympic Stadium, Rabat
Referee: Josphine Wanjiku (Kenya)

=== Final ===
16 August 2026
20:00

Cameroon	3–0	Malawi
Ngah Manga 20', 45+3'; Eto 29'	Report (FIFA)

Moulay El Hassan Stadium, Rabat
Referee: Shahenda El Maghrabi (Egypt)

== Qualified teams for the 2027 FIFA Women's World Cup ==
The top four teams in the competition qualified directly for the 2027 FIFA Women's World Cup in Brazil, while two additional teams will have the chance to join them through the inter-confederation playoffs.

Team	Qualified on	Previous appearances in FIFA Women's World Cup
Algeria	8 August 2026	0 (debut)
Morocco	8 August 2026	1 (2023)
Cameroon	9 August 2026	2 (2015, 2019)
Malawi	9 August 2026	0 (debut)

== Statistics ==
=== Goalscorers ===
There were 90 goals scored in 32 matches, for an average of 2.81 goals per match.

5 goals

- (Cameroon women's national football team) Marie Ngah Manga
- (Malawi women's national football team) Temwa Chaŵinga
- (Zambia women's national football team) Barbra Banda

4 goals

- (Ivory Coast women's national football team) Inès Konan
- (Malawi women's national football team) Tabitha Chaŵinga

3 goals

- (South Africa women's national soccer team) Thembi Kgatlana

2 goals

- (Algeria women's national football team) Marine Dafeur
- (Egypt women's national football team) Nadine Ghazi
- (Ivory Coast women's national football team) N'Sira Ouédraogo
- (Ivory Coast women's national football team) Grâce Sery
- (Malawi women's national football team) Rose Kadzere
- (Morocco women's national football team) Ibtissam Jraïdi
- (Morocco women's national football team) Sakina Ouzraoui Diki
- (Nigeria women's national football team) Rasheedat Ajibade
- (Nigeria women's national football team) Uchenna Kanu
- (Nigeria women's national football team) Asisat Oshoala
- (Tanzania women's national football team) Diana Msewa

1 goal

- (Algeria women's national football team) Ikram Adjabi
- (Algeria women's national football team) Lynda Bendris
- (Algeria women's national football team) Mélissa Bethi
- (Algeria women's national football team) Lina Boussaha
- (Algeria women's national football team) Inès Khiri
- (Algeria women's national football team) Amira Ould Braham
- (Burkina Faso women's national football team) Adama Congo
- (Burkina Faso women's national football team) Adèle Kabré
- (Burkina Faso women's national football team) Balkissa Sawadogo
- (Cameroon women's national football team) Grâce Davila Mendoua
- (Cameroon women's national football team) Naomi Eto
- (Cameroon women's national football team) Maëva Nyadjou
- (Cape Verde women's national football team) Alivia Kelly
- (Cape Verde women's national football team) Ivânia Moreira
- (Cape Verde women's national football team) Evy Pereira
- (Egypt women's national football team) Eman Hassan
- (Ghana women's national football team) Evelyn Badu
- (Ghana women's national football team) Doris Boaduwaa
- (Ghana women's national football team) Chantelle Boye-Hlorkah
- (Ivory Coast women's national football team) Rebecca Elloh
- (Malawi women's national football team) Faith Chinzimu
- (Mali women's national football team) Kadidiatou Diabaté
- (Mali women's national football team) Fatoumata Diarra
- (Mali women's national football team) Oumou Kone
- (Mali women's national football team) Fatoumata Niakaté
- (Mali women's national football team) Aïssata Traoré
- (Morocco women's national football team) Hanane Aït El Haj
- (Morocco women's national football team) Maryame Atiq
- (Morocco women's national football team) Kautar Azraf
- (Morocco women's national football team) Sanaâ Mssoudy
- (Nigeria women's national football team) Gift Monday
- (Nigeria women's national football team) Joy Omewa
- (Nigeria women's national football team) Christy Ucheibe
- (Senegal women's national football team) Seynabou Mbengue
- (South Africa women's national soccer team) Hildah Magaia
- (South Africa women's national soccer team) Bambanani Mbane
- (Tanzania women's national football team) Aisha Mnunka
- (Tanzania women's national football team) Hasnath Ubamba
- (Zambia women's national football team) Prisca Chilufya
- (Zambia women's national football team) Racheal Nachula
- (Zambia women's national football team) Eneless Phiri

1 own goal

- (Cape Verde women's national football team) Eleia Vieira (against Ghana)

=== Discipline ===
The following suspensions were accumulated during the tournament:

Tournament suspensions for players and team officials
Player	Offense(s)	Suspension(s)
(Burkina Faso) Faoziatou Ouédraogo	(red card) in Group B vs Ivory Coast (matchday 1; 27 July)	Group B vs Tanzania (matchday 2; 31 July)
(Cape Verde) Kleydiana Borges	(red card) in Group D vs Ghana (matchday 1; 29 July)	Group D vs Mali (matchday 2; 2 August)
(Tanzania) Hasnath Ubamba	(red card) in Group B vs Burkina Faso (matchday 2; 31 July)	Group B vs Ivory Coast (matchday 3; 4 August)
(Malawi) Rose Alufandika	(red card) in Group C vs Egypt (matchday 2; 1 August)	Group C vs Zambia (matchday 3; 5 August)
(Nigeria) Oluwatosin Demehin	(red card) in Group C vs Zambia (matchday 2; 1 August)	Group C vs Egypt (matchday 3; 5 August)
(Nigeria) Jennifer Echegini	(yellow card) in Group C vs Malawi (matchday 1; 28 July); (yellow card) in Group C vs Zambia (matchday 2; 1 August)	Group C vs Egypt (matchday 3; 5 August)
(Ivory Coast) Rosemonde Kouassi	(yellow card) in Group B vs South Africa (matchday 2; 31 July); (yellow card) in Group B vs Tanzania (matchday 3; 4 August)	Quarter-finals vs Algeria (8 August)
(Malawi) Madyina Ngulube	(yellow card) in Group C vs Nigeria (matchday 1; 28 July); (yellow card) in Group C vs Zambia (matchday 3; 5 August)	Quarter-finals vs Ghana (9 August)
(Malawi) Leticia Chinyamula	(yellow card) in Group C vs Egypt (matchday 2; 1 August); (yellow card) in Group C vs Zambia (matchday 3; 5 August)	Quarter-finals vs Ghana (9 August)
(Cameroon) Genevieve Ngo Mbeleck	(yellow card) in Group D vs Ghana (matchday 2; 2 August); (yellow card) in Group D vs Cape Verde (matchday 3; 6 August)	Quarter-finals vs Nigeria (9 August)
(Ivory Coast) N'Sira Ouédraogo	(red card) in Quarter-finals vs Algeria (8 August)	Play-in match vs Ghana (13 August)

== Awards ==
The following awards were given at the conclusion of the tournament:

Award	Winner
Best player	(Cameroon) Monique Ngock
Best goalkeeper	(Cameroon) Michaely Bihina
Top scorer	(Malawi) Temwa Chaŵinga
Fair Play	Algeria

=== Top goalscorers ===
Below is the list of the three top goalscorers of the tournament. As three players scored five goals each, the tiebreaker used for the golden boot was most assists. Temwa Chaŵinga had the most assists out of these three players.

- (Malawi) Temwa Chaŵinga: 5 goals, 2 assists
- (Zambia) Barbra Banda: 5 goals, 1 assist
- (Cameroon) Marie Ngah Manga: 5 goals

=== Team of the Tournament ===
The official best XI of the 2026 Women's Africa Cup of Nations, selected by the CAF Technical Study Group based on the players' performances throughout the tournament

Goalkeeper	Defenders	Midfielders	Forwards
(Cameroon) Michaely Bihina	(Algeria) Inès Belloumou (Morocco) Nouhaila Benzina (Morocco) Hanane Aït El Haj (Cameroon) Maëva Nyadjou	(Algeria) Marine Dafeur (Cameroon) Monique Ngock (Malawi) Temwa Chawinga	(Malawi) Tabitha Chawinga (Zambia) Barbra Banda (Cameroon) Marie Ngah Manga

=== Woman of the match ===
The Woman of the Match award was presented after each game during the tournament. The award, presented by TotalEnergies, included an official trophy handed to the player at the end of the match.

Stage	Team 1	Result	Team 2	Woman of the Match
Group stage matches
Group A	Algeria	2–0	Senegal	(Algeria) Mélissa Bethi
Group A	Morocco	4–0	Kenya	(Morocco) Hanane Aït El Haj
Group B	South Africa	1–2	Tanzania	(Tanzania) Diana Msewa
Group B	Ivory Coast	4–1	Burkina Faso	(Ivory Coast) Inès Konan
Group C	Zambia	6–0	Egypt	(Zambia) Barbra Banda
Group C	Nigeria	2–3	Malawi	(Malawi) Temwa Chaŵinga
Group D	Ghana	2–0	Cape Verde	(Ghana) Josephine Bonsu
Group D	Cameroon	2–1	Mali	(Cameroon) Marie Ngah Manga
Group A	Senegal	1–0	Kenya	(Senegal) Adji Ndiaye
Group A	Morocco	1–0	Algeria	(Morocco) Sanaâ Mssoudy
Group B	South Africa	2–2	Ivory Coast	(Ivory Coast) Grâce Sery
Group B	Burkina Faso	2–1	Tanzania	(Burkina Faso) Balkissa Sawadogo
Group C	Egypt	1–3	Malawi	(Malawi) Rose Kadzere
Group C	Nigeria	1–0	Zambia	(Nigeria) Michelle Alozie
Group D	Ghana	0–1	Cameroon	(Cameroon) Monique Ngock
Group D	Mali	3–2	Cape Verde	(Mali) Aïssata Traoré
Group A	Senegal	0–0	Morocco	(Senegal) Adji Ndiaye
Group A	Kenya	0–2	Algeria	(Algeria) Marine Dafeur
Group B	Burkina Faso	0–1	South Africa	(South Africa) Thembi Kgatlana
Group B	Tanzania	1–2	Ivory Coast	(Ivory Coast) N'Sira Ouédraogo
Group C	Egypt	2–6	Nigeria	(Nigeria) Rinsola Babajide
Group C	Malawi	1–2	Zambia	(Zambia) Barbra Banda
Group D	Mali	1–1	Ghana	(Ghana) Portia Boakye
Group D	Cape Verde	1–1	Cameroon	(Cape Verde) Eleia Vieira
Knockout stage matches
Quarter-finals	Ivory Coast	1–2	Algeria	(Algeria) Amira Ould Braham
Quarter-finals	Morocco	2–1	South Africa	(Morocco) Nouhaila Benzina
Quarter-finals	Cameroon	1–0	Nigeria	(Cameroon) Michaely Bihina
Quarter-finals	Malawi	2–1	Ghana	(Malawi) Temwa Chaŵinga
Semi-finals	Morocco	0–0 (1–3 p)	Cameroon	(Cameroon) Michaely Bihina
Semi-finals	Algeria	1–3	Malawi	(Malawi) Tabitha Chaŵinga
Third place play-off	Morocco	1–1 (2–3 p)	Algeria	(Algeria) Lina Boussaha
Final	Cameroon	3–0	Malawi	(Cameroon) Marie Ngah Manga
