= Maryame Atiq =

Moroccan footballer (born 1998)

Personal information
- Full name: Maryame Atiq Ez-Zity
- Date of birth: 24 January 1998 (age 28)
- Place of birth: Kalaat Sraghna, Morocco
- Height: 1.79 m (5 ft 10 in)
- Position: Defender

Youth career
- Ponferradina
- 2012–2015: Unión Valdornesa
- 2015–2017: Ponferradina

Senior career*
Years	Team	Apps	(Gls)
2017–2021	San Pio X		
2021–2022	Parquesol	19	(0)
2022–2023	Unión Vieira	26	(0)
2023–2024	DUX Logroño	24	(0)
2024–2025	AEM Lleida	21	(0)
2025–	FUS Rabat	18	(2)

International career^{‡}
2025–	Morocco B	1	(0)
2022–	Morocco		(1)
- * Club domestic league appearances and goals as of 20 July 2026 ‡ National team caps and goals as of 20 July 2026

Maryame "Ame" Atiq Ez-Zity (Note: Also transliterated as Maryem Atiq) (Arabic: مريم عتيق الزيتي, pronounced [mər.jəm ʕə.tiːq əz.zəj.ti]; born 24 January 1998) is a Moroccan footballer who plays as a centre-back for Moroccan Women's Championship D1 (Botola Féminine) club FUS Rabat and the Morocco national team.

Born in Morocco, as a child Atiq and her family migrated to Spain, where her youth development took place. She began her career in the variously named third and later second divisions of the Spanish league system, playing for San Pio X, Parquesol, Unión Viera, DUX Logroño and AEM Lleida. She later returned to Morocco, where she signed for Botola Féminine club FUS Rabat.

== Early life ==
Atiq was born on 24 January 1998 in Kalaat Sraghna, Marrakesh-Safi. As a child, she left Morocco with her family and migrated to Spain, settling in Veguellina de Órbigo, León, Castille and León. She began playing football in her home town at the age of five, playing alongside some of her classmates and friends.

== Club career ==
=== Parquesol ===
Ahead of the 2023–24 season, Atiq signed for Segunda División Pro club Parquesol. Parquesol were relegated to the Segunda División via the relegation playoffs after losing 2–1 away to Fundación Albacete. Throughout the season, she made a total of 19 appearances across all competitions.

=== Unión Viera ===
Ahead of the 2022–23 season, Atiq signed for Segunda División club Unión Viera. On 18 September 2022, she scored her first goal for the club in a 2–1 defeat to Levante B at home at the Alfonso Silva Stadium in Las Palmas, Las Palmas, Canary Islands. She scored again on 3 December 2022, scoring a penalty in a 5–3 loss at home to fellow Canarian side Real Unión Tenerife. She scored once more on 14 January 2023, doing so in a 3–0 victory over Real Betis B at home. Throughout the season, she made a total of 26 appearances across all competitions, scoring three goals.

=== DUX Logroño ===
Ahead of the 2023–24 season, Atiq signed for Primera Federación club DUX Logroño. Throughout the season, she made a total of 24 appearances across all competitions.

=== AEM Lleida ===
Ahead of the 2024–25 season, Atiq signed for Primera Federación club AEM Lleida. At the club, she played alongside Morocco national team teammates Inés Faddi and Fatima Zohra Gharbi. She made her début on 11 September 2024 in a Copa de la Reina match against Balears in the first round, which ended 1–1 after extra time at Campo de Son Malferit in Palma de Mallorca, Balearic Islands. She picked up a yellow card during the match before later scoring the winning penalty in the penalty shootout that saw AEM advance after winning 4–3 on penalties. On 15 September 2024, she scored her first goal of the season, scoring in a 3–1 away win over Barcelona B in the league at Ciutat Esportiva Joan Gamper in Sant Joan Despí, Barcelona, Catalonia. The goal was also her first for any club in the Spanish second division. In the Copa de la Reina second round on 3 October 2024, she scored the equaliser in a 2–1 away win after extra time over Liga F side Espanyol at Ciutat Esportiva Dani Jarque in Sant Adrià de Besòs, Barcelona. In the third round on 20 November 2024, she scored again in a 1–1 draw after extra time at home against Liga F side Villarreal at Camp de Futbol Municipal de Recasens in Lleida, Lleida, Catalonia, though was one of three AEM players that missed their penalties in the penalty shootout, which saw Villarreal advance 3–2. Throughout the season, she made a total of 21 appearances across all competitions, scoring three goals.

=== FUS Rabat ===
Ahead of the 2025–26 season, Atiq returned to Morocco signed for Moroccan Women's Championship D1 (Botola Féminine) side FUS Rabat. Throughout the season, she made a total of 23 appearances across all competitions, scoring two goals.

== International career ==
Being a Moroccan Spaniard, Atiq was eligible to represent either Morocco (where she was born) or Spain (where she was raised) under FIFA eligibility rules. However, she was never called up for Spain at any level. Nevertheless, she considers herself both Moroccan and Spanish.

=== 2023 ===
Atiq received her first call-up for Morocco by French manager Reynald Pedros for a two-match friendly series against Ireland on 11 and 14 November at Marbella Football Centre in Marbella, Spain. She made her international début in the first match, which was held behind closed doors, coming on as a substitute in the second half. In the second match, which Morocco lost 4–0, she made her first international start.

Atiq was again called up for Morocco for a two-match friendly series against Slovakia on 17 February and Bosnia and Herzegovina on 21 February at the Emirhan Sports Complex in Antalya, Turkey. Morocco defeated Slovakia 3–0 and Bosnia and Herzegovina 2–0, though she did not play in either match.

Atiq was once again called up for a two-match friendly series against the Czech Republic (who they played on 6 April at the Letní Stadion in Chomutov, Czech Republic) and Romania (who they played on 11 April at the Arcul de Triumf Stadium in Bucharest, Romania). She was substituted on in the first match, a 1–0 loss to the Czech Republic, before starting in the second match, a 2–0 loss to Romania.

Despite being called up for all of Morocco's matches in preparation for the tournament, Atiq was not part of the 28-player preliminary squad Pedros named ahead of the 2023 FIFA Women's World Cup in Australia and New Zealand, thus determining that she had missed out on the final 26-player squad for the tournament.

=== 2024 ===
Atiq was called up by Spanish manager Jorge Vilda for Morocco's two-legged fourth round tie against Zambia, with the two legs held on 5 and 9 April. Morocco won the first leg 2–1 at Levy Mwanawasa Stadium in Ndola, Zambia, before losing the second leg 2–0 after extra time at Moulay El Hassan Stadium in Rabat, Morocco, with the 3–2 aggregate score causing Morocco to miss the 2024 Olympic Games in France.

=== 2025 ===
Atiq was called up for Morocco B by Spanish manager Miguel Ángel Sopuerta for a friendly match behind closed doors against Tunisia A on 8 April at Mohammed VI Football Academy in Salé, Morocco. Morocco were defeated 4–2.

=== 2026 ===
Atiq was called up by Vilda for a two-match friendly series against Burkina Faso at Al Medina Stadium in Rabat on 27 February and 4 March. Morocco won the first match 5–0 before drawing the second match 1–1, being named on the bench in the first game and starting in the second game.

As part of preparations for the 2026 Women's Africa Cup of Nations (WAFCON) on home soil, Atiq was called up by Vilda as part of a 31-player squad that played two a two-match friendly series against Benin on 5 June at Moulay El Hassan Stadium in Rabat, and New Zealand on 9 June at the Nuevo Estadio El Maulí in Málaga, Spain. Morocco defeated Benin 4–2 and drew 0–0 with New Zealand, with her starting against the former and being an unused substitute against the latter.

Atiq was named by Vilda as part of the 26-player squad that Morocco sent to WAFCON. As she was not selected for the 2023 World Cup or the 2024 WAFCON, this would be her first major international tournament. Ahead of the tournament, Morocco played a friendly match against Cape Verde at Père Jégo Stadium in Casablanca, Morocco on 21 July, in which she was named on the bench. Morocco won the match 5–0.

For the group stage, Morocco were drawn into Group A, facing Kenya, Algeria and Senegal on 26 and 30 July and 3 August, respectively, all of whom they will face at Moulay Hassan Stadium in Rabat. She played the entirety of all three group stage matches, a 4–0 win over Kenya (in which she scored her first international goal), a 1–0 win over rivals Algeria and a 0–0 draw with Senegal.

In the quarter-finals, Atiq played the entirety of a 2–1 win over South Africa at Moulay El Hassan Stadium, which secured Morocco a place at the 2027 FIFA Women's World Cup in Brazil. In the semi-finals, she played the entirety of the match against Cameroon at the same stadium, with the match ending in a 0–0 draw after extra time and resulting in a penalty shootout, in which she missed a penalty, that delivered upset 3–1 victory for eventual champions Cameroon, eliminating Morocco from the tournament. She then played the entirety of the third place match against rivals and earlier group stage opponents Algeria at Rabat Olympic Stadium, which ended in a 1–1 draw, with the subsequent penalty shootout resulting in a 3–2 defeat for Morocco, leading them to finish in fourth place.

== Career statistics ==
=== Club ===
As of 24 July 2026

Appearances and goals by club, season and competition
Club	Season	League			Domestic cup			Regional cup			Total	
Club	Season	Division	Apps	Goals	Cup	Apps	Cup	Goals	Apps	Goals	Apps	Goals
Parquesol	2021–22	Segunda División Pro	18	0	Copa de la Reina	1	0	—	—	—	19	0
Unión Viera	2022–23	Segunda Federación	25	3	Copa de la Reina	1	0	—	—	—	26	3
DUX Logroño	2023–24	Primera Federación	23	0	Copa de la Reina	1	0	—	—	—	24	0
AEM Lleida	2024–25	Primera Federación	15	1	Copa de la Reina	3	2	Copa Catalunya	3	0	21	3
FUS Rabat	2025–26	Botola Féminine	22	2	Throne Cup	1	0	—	—	—	23	2
Career total			103	6	Total	7	2	Total	3	0	113	8

== Personal life ==
A native Arabic speaker, Atiq is also highly fluent in Spanish.

During her time at Parquesol, Atiq worked as a part-time administrative assistant.
