= Belgian Lion Award =

Football award

The Belgian Lion Award (Dutch: Belgische Leeuw, French: Lion Belge) is a football award in Belgium given annually to the best Maghreb player of Arab / Amazigh origin in the Belgian First Division A. Recently, secondary awards have also been handed out to the best footballer abroad, youngster, female footballer, coach and futsal player.

== Winners ==
=== Men ===
Year	Belgian Lion	
Year	Player	Club
2010	Mbark Boussoufa (MAR)	Anderlecht
2011	Mbark Boussoufa (MAR)	Anderlecht
2012	Soufiane Bidaoui (MAR)	Lierse
2013	Hamdi Harbaoui (TUN)	Lokeren
2014	Hamdi Harbaoui (TUN)	Lokeren
2015	Mehdi Carcela (MAR)	Standard Liège
2016	Sofiane Hanni (ALG)	Mechelen
2017	Ishak Belfodil (ALG)	Standard Liège
2018	Mehdi Carcela (MAR)	Standard Liège
2019	Mehdi Carcela (MAR)	Standard Liège
2020	Selim Amallah (MAR)	Standard Liège
2021	Tarik Tissoudali (MAR)	Gent
2022	Tarik Tissoudali (MAR)	Gent
2023	Bilal El Khannouss (MAR)	Genk
2024	Mohamed Amoura (ALG)	Union SG
2025	Zakaria El Ouahdi (MAR)	Genk

=== Women ===
Year	Belgian Lioness	
Year	Player	Club
2010	no award	
2011	no award	
2012	no award	
2013	no award	
2014	Ibtissam Bouharat (MAR)	Anderlecht
2015	Ibtissam Bouharat (MAR)	Anderlecht
2016	Yasmina Benabid (ALG)	Anderlecht
2017	Anaïs Bey-Temsamani (MAR)	OH Leuven
2018	Inara Bouker (MAR)	OH Leuven
2019	Sakina Ouzraoui Diki (MAR)	Anderlecht
2020	Sakina Ouzraoui Diki (MAR)	Anderlecht
2021	Sakina Ouzraoui Diki (MAR)	Anderlecht
2022	Rkia Mazrouai (MAR)	Gent
2023	Sakina Ouzraoui Diki (MAR)	Anderlecht
2024	Rania Boutiebi (MAR)	Club YLA
2025	Rania Boutiebi (MAR)	Club YLA

== Breakdown of winners ==
=== By country of origin ===
Country	Number of wins	Winning years
Morocco	11	2010, 2011, 2012, 2015, 2018, 2019, 2020, 2021, 2022, 2023, 2025
Algeria	3	2016, 2017, 2024
Tunisia	2	2013, 2014

=== By club ===
Club	Number of wins	Winning years
Standard Liège	5	2015, 2017, 2018, 2019, 2020
Anderlecht	2	2010, 2011
Lokeren	2	2013, 2014
Gent	2	2021, 2022
Genk	2	2023, 2025
Lierse	1	2012
Mechelen	1	2016
Union SG	1	2024

=== By country of origin ===
Country	Number of wins	Winning years
Morocco	11	2014, 2015, 2017, 2018, 2019, 2020, 2021, 2022, 2023, 2024, 2025
Algeria	1	2016

=== By club ===
Club	Number of wins	Winning years
Anderlecht	7	2014, 2015, 2016, 2019, 2020, 2021, 2023
OH Leuven	2	2017, 2018
Club YLA	2	2024, 2025
Gent	1	2022
