= Kautar Azraf =

Spanish Moroccan footballer (born 2008)

Personal information
- Full name: Kautar Azraf Aouragh
- Date of birth: 3 January 2008 (age 18)
- Place of birth: Manresa, Spain
- Height: 1.74 m (5 ft 9 in)
- Positions: Forward; midfielder

Team information
- Current team: Barcelona B

Youth career
- 2018–2019: Igualada
- 2019–2025: Barcelona

Senior career*
| Years | Team | Apps | (Gls) |
| 2025– | Barcelona B | 21 | (3) |

International career^{‡}
| 2022–2023 | Catalonia U15 | | |
| 2022–2023 | Spain U15 | | |
| 2023 | Spain U16 | | |
| 2023–2024 | Morocco U17 | | |
| 2024– | Morocco U20 | | |
| 2026– | Morocco | | |
- * Club domestic league appearances and goals as of 26 July 2026 ‡ National team caps and goals as of 30 July 2026

Kautar Azraf Aouragh (Arabic: كوثر أزراف أوراغ, pronounced [kawˈtaːr azˈraf awˈraɣ]; born 3 January 2008) is a footballer who plays as a striker or attacking midfielder for Primera Federación club Barcelona B. Born in Spain, she plays for the Morocco national team. She is regarded as one of the best young talents in African women's football.

== Early life ==
Azraf was born on 3 January 2008 in Manresa, Barcelona, Catalonia, Spain. Her sister, Leila, was born in 2011, and is also a footballer. They are both of Moroccan descent.

Azraf first played football as a child in boys' teams. She formally began playing youth football at the age of 10, playing for Igualada. She scored a total of 45 goals in the under-12s competition (known as the Alevín category). Her performances resulted in her being scouted by Liga F club Barcelona, who gave her a spot in La Masia (their academy) and later Barcelona B (their reserve team in the Primera Federación).

== Club career ==
=== Barcelona B ===
After spending six years at La Masia, the academy of Liga F club Barcelona, Azraf was given a spot in the club's reserve team, Barcelona B, ahead of the 2025–26 Primera Federación season. Throughout the season, she played a total of 21 matches across all competitions (though only four of which she started), scoring two goals.

== International career ==
=== Spain U15 ===
After having represented Catalonia at under-15 level, Azraf was called up by manager Laura del Río for the Spain under-15 national team for the 2023 UEFA Under-16 Women's Development Tournament in Portugal. Azraf started in a 2–1 defeat to Belgium on 25 November 2022 at the Estádio Municipal de Lagos in Lagos, before coming off the bench in a 3–2 victory over Finland on 27 November 2022 and a 1–0 victory over Portugal on 30 November 2022, with the latter two both being held at the Estádio Municipal de Bela Vista in Parchal.

=== Spain U16 ===
In 2023, Azraf began training with the Spain under-16 national team.

=== Morocco U17 ===
Azraf was called up for the Morocco under-17 national team by manager Youness Rabie for a two-match friendly series against Cameroon at the Stade de Ngoa-Ekélé in Yaoundé, Cameroon on 8 and 13 July 2023. Cameroon won the first match 2–0. In the second match, she scored from a free kick in a 1–1 draw.

After training with the Spain under-16 national team, Azraf returned to the Morocco under-17 setup. She was called up for a fourth round qualifying tie against Zambia for the 2024 FIFA U-17 Women's World Cup in the Dominican Republic. She scored the only goal in Morocco's 3–1 loss in the first leg of the tie at Nkoloma Stadium in Lusaka. After a 0–0 draw in the second leg at Berkane Municipal Stadium in Berkane, Morocco, Zambia qualified for the U-17 World Cup, while Morocco were eliminated.

Morocco hosted the 2025 FIFA U-17 Women's World Cup, with Azraf being selected by manager Anwar Mghinia as part of Morocco's 21-player squad for the tournament. For the group stage, Morocco were drawn into Group A. Morocco were defeated 3–0 by Brazil on 17 October 2025 and 3–1 by Italy on 21 October 2025, but advanced to the knockout stage by coming third after a 3–1 victory over Costa Rica. In the round of 16, they suffered a heavy 6–1 defeat to eventual champions North Korea on 28 October 2025. Azraf started all four games, all of which were played at Rabat Olympic Stadium in Rabat.

=== Morocco U20 ===
Azraf was called up for the Morocco under-20 national team by Spanish manager Jorge Vilda in preparation for the 2024 FIFA U-20 Women's World Cup in Colombia. She was named as part of Morocco's 21-player squad for the tournament. Aged 16 years and seven months old, she was the youngest player at the entire tournament. Morocco were drawn into Group D, facing Paraguay on 1 September, the United States on 4 September and Spain on 7 September, with each match played at the Estadio Olimpico Pascual Guerrero in Cali. She came on as a substitute against Paraguay before starting against the United States and Spain, with Morocco losing each match 2–0 and being eliminated in the group stage with zero points.

=== Morocco ===
Azraf received her first call-up for Morocco when Spanish manager Jorge Vilda selected her as part of a 31-player squad for a two-match friendly series against Benin at Moulay El Hassan Stadium in Rabat, Morocco, and New Zealand at the Nuevo Estadio El Maulí in Málaga, Spain on 5 and 9 June 2026, respectively, held as part of the team's preparations for the 2026 Women's Africa Cup of Nations (WAFCON) on home soil. Morocco defeated Benin 4–2 and drew 0–0 with New Zealand. She started in both matches, making her first and second appearances for the Atlas Lionesses.

Azraf was named by Vilda as part of the 26-player squad that Morocco sent to WAFCON, being the youngest player in the squad. Ahead of the tournament, Morocco played a friendly match against Cape Verde at Père Jégo Stadium in Casablanca, Morocco on 21 July 2026, in which she started. Morocco won the match 5–0. For the group stage, Morocco were drawn into Group A, facing Kenya, Algeria and Senegal on 26 and 30 July and 3 August, respectively, all of whom they will face at Moulay Hassan Stadium in Rabat. She played the entirety of the first two matches, a 4–0 win over Kenya and a 1–0 win over rivals Algeria, but was an unused substitute in a 0–0 draw with Senegal. She was an unused substitute in a 2–1 win over South Africa at Moulay El Hassan Stadium in the quarter-finals, which secured Morocco a place at the 2027 FIFA Women's World Cup in Brazil. In the semi-finals at the same stadium, she was an unused substitute against Cameroon, with the match ending in a 0–0 draw after extra time and resulting in a penalty shootout that delivered upset 3–1 victory for eventual champions Cameroon, eliminating Morocco from the tournament. She then started in the third place match against rivals and earlier group stage opponents Algeria at Rabat Olympic Stadium, scoring the opening goal and picking up a yellow card before being substituted off ahead of the penalty shootout after a 1–1 draw, which resulted in Morocco losing 3–2 and taking fourth place.

== International goals ==
| No. | Date | Venue | Opponent | Score | Result | Competition |
|---|---|---|---|---|---|---|
| 1. | 15 August 2026 | Rabat Olympic Stadium, Rabat, Morocco | Algeria | 1–0 | 1–1 (2–3 p) | 2026 Women's Africa Cup of Nations |

== Career staistics ==
=== Club ===
As of 26 July 2026

Appearances and goals by club, season and competition
| Club | Season | League | | | Domestic cup | | | Regional cup | | | Total | |
| Club | Season | Division | Apps | Goals | Cup | Apps | Cup | Goals | Apps | Goals | Apps | Goals |
|---|---|---|---|---|---|---|---|---|---|---|---|---|
| Barcelona B | 2025–26 | Primera Federación | 19 | 3 | Copa de la Reina | — | — | Copa Catalunya | 2 | 0 | 21 | 3 |
| Career total | | | 19 | 3 | Total | 0 | 0 | Total | 2 | 0 | 21 | 3 |

== Personal life ==
Azraf's younger sister, Laila (who was born in 2011), also plays football, and additionally also practises athletics. She plays for the Morocco under-16 national team.
