= Hasnath Ubamba =

Tanzanian footballer (born 2006)

Personal information
- Full name: Hasnath Linus Ubamba
- Date of birth: 8 July 2006 (age 20)
- Height: 1.57 m (5 ft 2 in)
- Position: Midfielder

Team information
- Current team: Madrid CFF

Senior career*
Years	Team	Apps	(Gls)
2023–2024	Fountain Gate Princess		
2024–2026	FC Masar	62	(30)
2026–	Madrid CFF	0	(0)

International career
2021–2022	Tanzania U17		
2023–2026	Tanzania U20		
2024–	Tanzania		
- * Club domestic league appearances and goals

Hasnath Linus Ubamba (born 8 July 2006) is a Tanzanian professional footballer who plays as a midfielder for Liga F club Madrid CFF and the Tanzania national team.

== Club career ==
=== FC Masar ===
In July 2024, Ubamba joined Tutankhamun (now known as Masar) of the Egyptian Women's Premier League for a three-year contract, becoming the third Fountain Gate Princess player to sign for an Egyptian club after Burundian striker Sandrine Niyonkuru and Tanzanian midfielder Suzan Adam. She played a key role in helping the club qualify for the 2024 CAF Women's Champions League, where they went on to finish third and claim the bronze medal. Over her two years with the club, she was regarded as one of its best players, helping the team secure two league titles following the club's maiden championship before her arrival. Where she made 62 appearances, scoring 30 goals and providing 19 assists.

=== Madrid CFF ===
In July 2026, it was announced that Ubamba would join Liga F club Madrid CFF.

== International career ==
Ubamba has represented Tanzania across all age categories. She was included in the squad for the 2022 FIFA U-17 Women's World Cup and the 2023 African Games before receiving her first senior national team call-up in October 2024 for the Morocco 3-Nations Tournament, where she made her debut as a starter against the hosts. She later represented Tanzania at the 2024 and 2026 Women's Africa Cup of Nations and the 2025 CECAFA Women's Championship. In 2026, she scored the winning goal that secured Tanzania's first-ever qualification for the FIFA U-20 Women's World Cup.

On 27 July 2026, she scored her first international goal and the winning goal against South Africa, to give Tanzania their first win at the competition.

=== International goals ===
Scores and results list Tanzania's goal tally first, score column indicates score after each Ubamba goal.

No.	Date	Venue	Opponent	Score	Result	Competition	Ref.
1	27 July 2026	Moulay Rachid Stadium, Casablanca, Morocco	South Africa	2–1	2–1	2026 Africa Cup of Nations	
