= Sakina Ouzraoui Diki =

Moroccan footballer (born 2002)

Sakina Ouzraoui
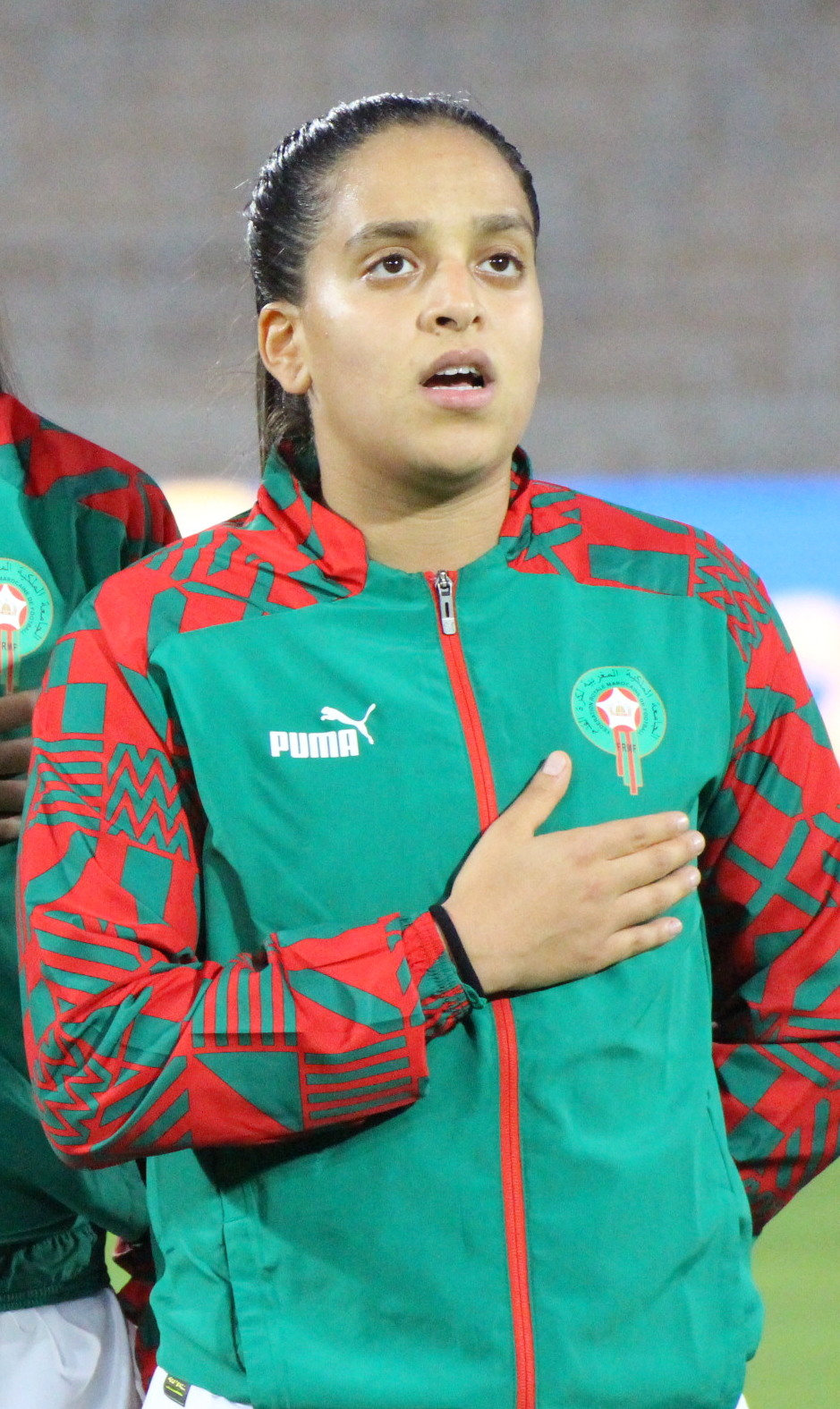
- Ouzraoui with Morocco in 2023

Personal information
- Birth name: Sakina Ouzraoui Diki (Note: In this Spanish name, the first or paternal surname is Ouzraoui and the second or maternal family name is Diki.)
- Date of birth: 29 August 2001 (age 25)
- Place of birth: Barcelona, Spain
- Height: 1.64 m (5 ft 5 in)
- Position: Forward

Team information
- Current team: UD Tenerife
- Number: 19

Senior career*
Years	Team	Apps	(Gls)
2018	RWDM		
2018–2022	Anderlecht	50	(7)
2022–2023	Club YLA	29	(10)
2023–2024	Anderlecht	28	(8)
2024–2026	UD Tenerife	28	(4)
2026–	Madrid CFF	1	(1)

International career
2016	Belgium U15		
2017	Belgium U16		
2022–	Morocco	20	(7)
- * Club domestic league appearances and goals as of 7 September 2024

Sakina Ouzraoui Diki (born 29 August 2001) is a professional footballer who plays as a forward for Liga F club Madrid Cff. Born in Spain and raised in Belgium, she plays for the Morocco women's national team.

== International goals ==
No.	Date	Venue	Opponent	Score	Result	Competition
1.	26 September 2023	Moulay Hassan Stadium, Rabat, Morocco	Zambia	1–1	2–6	Friendly
2.	21 January 2025	Père Jégo Stadium, Casablanca, Morocco	Ghana	1–0	1–0	Friendly
3.	19 June 2025	Kenitra Municipal Stadium, Kenitra, Morocco	Malawi	2–2	4–2	Friendly
4.	22 July 2025	Rabat Olympic Stadium, Rabat, Morocco	Ghana	1–1	1–1 (a.e.t.) (4–2 p)	2024 Women's Africa Cup of Nations
5.	5 June 2026	Moulay Hassan Stadium, Rabat, Morocco	Benin	2–1	4–2	Friendly
6.	26 July 2026	Moulay Hassan Stadium, Rabat, Morocco	Kenya	1–0	4–0	2026 Women's Africa Cup of Nations
7.	8 August 2026	Moulay Hassan Stadium, Rabat, Morocco	South Africa	1–0	2–1	2026 Women's Africa Cup of Nations

== Honours ==
- Super League (5):
  - 2019, 2020, 2021, 2022, 2023
- Belgian Cup (1):
  - 2022

Individual

- Belgian Lion Award: 2019, 2020, 2021, 2023
