= Hajar Saïd =

Moroccan footballer (born 2005)

Personal information
- Date of birth: 22 May 2005 (age 21)
- Place of birth: Agadir, Morocco
- Height: 1.75 m (5 ft 9 in)
- Positions: Centre back; defensive midfielder

Team information
- Current team: Paris FC
- Number: 33

Youth career
- Hassania Agadir

Senior career*
Years	Team	Apps	(Gls)
- Najah Souss
2023–2024	Bordeaux	2	(0)
2024–2026	AS FAR		
2026–	Paris FC	0	(0)

International career^{‡}
2022	Morocco U17		
2023–2024	Morocco U20		
2025–	Morocco U23		
2026–	Morocco		
- * Club domestic league appearances and goals as of 21:15, 4 July 2026 (UTC) ‡ National team caps and goals as of 21:15, 4 July 2026 (UTC)

Hajar Saïd (born 22 May 2005) is a Moroccan professional footballer who plays as a centre-back or defensive midfielder for Première Ligue club Paris FC and the Morocco national team. She has previously played in France for Bordeaux, and in Morocco for Najah Souss and AS FAR.

== Club career ==
Saïd was born in Agadir, Morocco. After starting her football career locally with Hassania Agadir's youth program, she moved to Najah Souss Agadir. She made her Moroccan Women's Championship D1 debut in the 2021–22 season, going on to register 6 goals and 14 assists in her first year. The following season, she became an undisputed starter for Najah Souss, racking up 4 goals and 5 assists as a second-year player.

At the age of 18, Saïd moved abroad to France. She was announced at Bordeaux on 1 September 2023, signing a three-year contract with the Division 1 Féminine team. She went on to only appear for Bordeaux twice, making substitute cameos against Le Havre and Montpellier. Saïd departed from Bordeaux at the end of the season as the club struggled to grapple with administrative and financial problems, as well as relegation.

Following her stint at Bordeaux, Saïd signed domestically for AS FAR. She soon shined for her new club over the next few seasons, helping AS FAR win two national championships and the CAF Women's Champions League. In December 2025, she scored a goal in a 2–1 FIFA Women's Champions Cup victory over Chinese club Wuhan Jiangda that secured AS FAR a spot in the competition's semifinals. She then played the entirety of both of AS FAR's subsequent two matches, first against Arsenal and then against Gotham FC.

In February 2026, Saïd was reported to be on the radar of Paris Saint-Germain FC. On 15 June 2026, it was announced that Saïd had ended up signing for Paris Saint-Germain's cross-town rivals, Paris FC, on a three-year contract until 2029.

== International career ==
Saïd has represented Morocco at various youth national levels, including at the 2022 FIFA U-17 Women's World Cup and the 2024 FIFA U-20 Women's World Cup.

In October 2025, Saïd earned her first call-up to the Morocco senior national team. On 17 July 2026, Jorge Vilda included Saïd in the Morocco squad for the 2026 Women's Africa Cup of Nations.
