= Michaely Bihina =

Cameroonian footballer (born 2003)

Personal information
- Full name: Michaely Kyria Bihina
- Date of birth: 28 December 2003 (age 22)
- Place of birth: Yaoundé, Cameroon
- Height: 1.80 m (5 ft 11 in)
- Position: Goalkeeper

Team information
- Current team: Benfica
- Number: 46

Senior career*
Years	Team	Apps	(Gls)
2017–2022	Éclair de Sa'a		
2022–2026	Racing Power	71	(0)
2026–	Benfica	1	(0)

International career^{‡}
	Cameroon U17		(0)
	Cameroon U20		(0)
2021–	Cameroon		(0)
Medal record
Women's Africa Cup of Nations
Gold medal – first place	2026 Morocco
- * Club domestic league appearances and goals as of 16 August 2026 ‡ National team caps and goals as of 16 August 2026

Michaely Kyria Bihina (born 28 December 2003) is a Cameroonian professional footballer who plays as a goalkeeper for Campeonato Nacional Feminino (Liga BPI) club Benfica and the Cameroon national team.

Bihina began her senior club career with Éclair de Sa'a in Cameroon before moving to Portugal in 2022 to join Racing Power. She established herself as one of the leading goalkeepers in Liga BPI and was named the league's Best Goalkeeper for the 2023–24 season after appearing in all 22 league matches as Racing Power finished third in their debut season in the top flight. In February 2026, she joined Benfica on a contract running until 2029.

At international level, Bihina represented Cameroon at under-17 and under-20 levels before making her senior international debut in 2021.

== Early life ==
Bihina was born in the Ekounou-Nkoldongo area of Yaoundé, Cameroon. She initially played as a striker before switching to goalkeeper after a coach suggested that her height made her better suited to the position. According to Bihina, she was called up to a Cameroon national youth team six months after making the switch.

Bihina played for the women's team of Canon Yaoundé before joining Éclair de Sa'a in 2019.

== Club career ==
=== Early career and Éclair de Sa'a ===
Bihina began her professional club career in Cameroon with Éclair de Sa'a, joining the club in 2017. At Éclair, Bihina developed into one of the leading goalkeepers in Cameroonian women's football. Following the 2020–21 season, she was named the best goalkeeper of the Guinness Super League at the league's inaugural women's football awards. She remained with the club until 2022, when she moved to Portugal to join Racing Power.

=== Racing Power ===
Bihina joined Racing Power in 2022. She was part of the team that won the Portuguese second division in the 2022–23 season, earning promotion to the Liga BPI.

During Racing Power's first season in the Portuguese top flight in 2023–24, Bihina established herself as the club's first-choice goalkeeper. By March 2024, she had recorded 14 clean sheets in 20 appearances, conceding eight goals. She went on to appear in all 22 league matches as Racing Power finished third in their debut Liga BPI season. Her performances earned her the Liga BPI Best Goalkeeper award, selected by a jury comprising representatives of the Portuguese Football Federation (FPF) and the Portuguese Professional Football Players' Union.

That season, Racing Power also reached the final of the Taça de Portugal Feminina. Bihina started the final against Benfica at the Estádio Nacional on 19 May 2024, with Racing Power losing 4–1.

Bihina remained with Racing Power during the 2024–25 season and the first half of the 2025–26 season. She made seven appearances for the club during the latter campaign before leaving for Benfica in February 2026.

=== Benfica ===
On 1 February 2026, Benfica announced the signing of Bihina from Racing Power. She signed a contract with the club running until 2029. On joining Benfica, Bihina described the move as an opportunity to continue her development as a professional footballer and stated her intention to contribute towards the club's objectives.

== International career ==
Bihina represented Cameroon at youth international level, playing for the country's under-17 and under-20 teams before progressing to the senior national team. At the age of 15, she was part of the Cameroon team that won the silver medal at the 2019 African Games in Rabat, losing the final to Nigeria on penalties following a goalless draw. She made her senior international debut for the Cameroon women's national football team in 2021. She subsequently became part of Cameroon's senior goalkeeping options and represented the team in international competitions and qualification campaigns. In October 2025, Bihina started the second leg of Cameroon's 2026 Women's Africa Cup of Nations qualification tie against Algeria at the Stade de la Réunification in Douala. Cameroon lost the match 1–0 and were eliminated 3–1 on aggregate. After the competition was expanded, Cameroon was added to the qualified teams as the second round best four losers based on the FIFA Women's World Ranking.

Bihina was included in Cameroon's squad for the 2026 Women's Africa Cup of Nations in Morocco, her first appearance at the tournament. She emerged as one of Cameroon's standout players during the competition.

In the quarter-finals against defending champions Nigeria, Bihina made nine saves and kept a clean sheet as Cameroon won 1–0. The victory eliminated the ten-time African champions and secured Cameroon's qualification for the 2027 FIFA Women's World Cup in Brazil, their first qualification for the tournament since 2019. She was named Woman of the Match for her performance.

Bihina was again decisive in the semi-final against hosts Morocco. After keeping a clean sheet through 120 minutes, she saved three penalties in the resulting shoot-out as Cameroon won 3–1 to reach the final. She became the first Cameroon goalkeeper to save three penalties in a Women's Africa Cup of Nations shoot-out.

In the final, Bihina recorded another clean sheet as Cameroon defeated Malawi 3–0 to win their first Women's Africa Cup of Nations title. For her performances throughout the tournament, she was awarded the Golden Glove as the competition's best goalkeeper.

== Honours ==
Racing Power

- Campeonato Nacional II Divisão Feminino: 2022–23
- Taça de Portugal Feminina: 2023–24

Benfica

- Campeonato Nacional Feminino: 2025–26
- Taça de Portugal Feminina: 2025–26

Cameroon

- African Games silver medal: 2019
- Women's Africa Cup of Nations: 2026

Individual

- Cameroonian Women's Championship Best Goalkeeper: 2020–21
- Campeonato Nacional Feminino Best Goalkeeper: 2023–24
- Women's Africa Cup of Nations Golden Glove: 2026
