= Morocco women's national football team =

Women's national association football team representing Morocco

Morocco
- Nickname: لبؤات أطلس (The Atlas Lionesses)
- Association: Royal Moroccan Football Federation
- Head coach: Jorge Vilda
- Captain: Ghizlane Chebbak
- Most caps: Ghizlane Chebbak (69)
- Top scorer: Ibtissam Jraïdi (45)
- Home stadium: Various
- FIFA code: MAR
First colours	Second colours

FIFA ranking
- Current: 64 ▼2 (16 June 2026)
- Highest: 52 (July – August 2003)
- Lowest: 83 (July 2019)

First international
- Morocco 0–3 South Africa (Rabat, Morocco; 19 March 1998)

Biggest win
- Morocco 8–0 Lebanon (Alexandria, Egypt; 23 April 2006)

Biggest defeat
- Nigeria 8–0 Morocco (Kaduna, Nigeria; 17 October 1998)

World Cup
- Appearances: 2 (first in 2023)
- Best result: Round of 16 (2023)

Women's Africa Cup of Nations
- Appearances: 4 (first in 1998)
- Best result: Runners-up (2022, 2024)
Medal record
Women's Africa Cup of Nations
Silver medal – second place	2022 Morocco
Silver medal – second place	2024 Morocco
Arab Women's Cup
Silver medal – second place	2006 Egypt

The Morocco women's national football team (Arabic: منتخب المغرب لكرة القدم للسيدات, French: équipe du Maroc féminine de football) represents Morocco in international women's football and is managed by the Royal Moroccan Football Federation.

The team played its first international match in 1998 during the inaugural Women's Africa Cup of Nations. They later achieved runners-up finishes in the 2022 and 2024 editions of the tournament. They made their debut at the FIFA Women's World Cup in 2023, where they advanced to the knock-out stage after finishing second in their group, before being eliminated in the Round of 16 by France.

== History ==
=== The Journey of Morocco's Women's National Football Team ===
The Morocco women's national football team was established in 1997. Before 1997, Morocco was only represented by Morocco men's national football. On 26 April 2006, Morocco made their first ever final in the 2006 Arab Women's Championship, defeating Egypt 4–2 in the semi-final. They lost the final 1–0 against Algeria.

=== Milestones in Moroccan Women's Football ===
On 22 February 2020, Morocco lionesses managed to win the 2020 UNAF Women's Cup after defeating Algeria 2–0 to top the final standings.

After hiatus and lack of achievement, the Women's AFCON was expanded to 12 teams, starting from 2020, but due to COVID-19 pandemic, the first edition was held in Morocco 2022 instead. Using this home advantage, Morocco restarted its women's football structure, rebuilt its women's team that has long been neglected. With greater interest, Morocco was able to create history by reaching the semi-finals in their home soil. With this achievement, Morocco made a history as the first Arab country to qualify for the FIFA Women's World Cup, debuting in 2023. Morocco went on to make another historic chapter as the first North African and Arab country to participate in the final of a continental tournament by beating African powerhouse and three-times defending champions Nigeria on penalties. However, Morocco could not finish its dream in the final after losing to an experienced South African side, whose two goals crushed the Moroccan dream to win the title.

=== Evolution of Women's Football in Morocco ===
In their first ever FIFA Women's World Cup, Morocco qualified to the knockout stages after placing second in their group, losing their first match 6–0 to Germany and winning both their second and third match 1–0 respectively against South Korea and Colombia. This made them the lowest ranked nation to qualify for the knock-out stages. In the game against South Korea, Moroccan player Nouhaila Benzina became the first player to play in a World Cup match wearing a hijab. Morocco ended their journey in the Round of 16, after losing 4–0 to France.

On 12 October 2023, Spanish coach Jorge Vilda was announced as the new head coach of the Moroccan women's team. On 14 November 2023, Morocco was nominated for the 2023 Best African Women's National Team of the Year by CAF.

In the 2024 Women's Africa Cup of Nations, Morocco qualified to the knockout stages after finishing top in the group stages winning 2 matches and drawing one. They faced Mali and claimed a 3–1 victory. In the semi-final, they defeated Ghana in a penalty shootout. In the final, Morocco lost 3–2 to Nigeria, marking their second consecutive defeat in a WAFCON final.

In the 2026 Women's Africa Cup of Nations, Morocco topped their group with seven points after defeating Kenya 4–0, Algeria1–0, and drawing with Senegal 0–0. In the quarter-final, they defeated South Africa 2–1.

== Nicknames ==
The Morocco women's national football team is commonly known as the "Atlas Lionesses".

== Home stadium ==
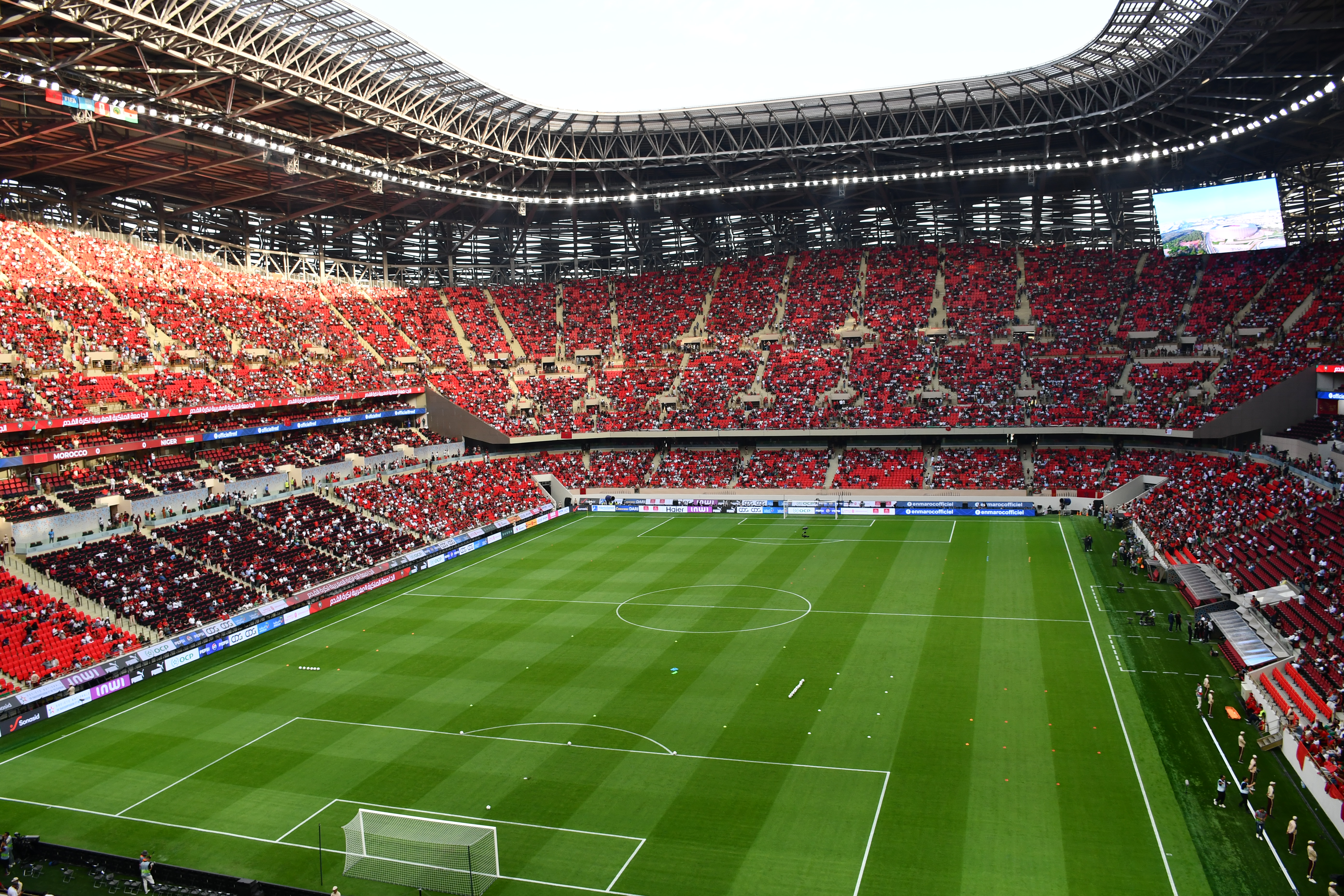
Prince Moulay Abdellah Stadium

Morocco's home matches are played at the Prince Moulay Abdellah Stadium in Rabat, which is managed by the Royal Moroccan Football Federation. The stadium is the home ground of AS FAR and regularly hosts matches of the Morocco national men's team. It has also served as a venue for several international tournaments, including the 2022 Women's Africa Cup of Nations, which was held at the former stadium prior to its demolition and reconstruction.

== Kit suppliers ==
Morocco's home colours are most red shirts and green shorts and socks, away colours are usually all white or all green.

Kit provider	Period
(Germany) Puma	1998–2002
(United States) Nike	2003–2006
(Germany) Puma	2007–2011
(Germany) Adidas	2012–2019
(Germany) Puma	2019–

== Results and fixtures ==
The following is a list of match results in the last 12 months, as well as any future matches that have been scheduled.

Legend

Win Draw Lose Fixture

=== 2025 ===
24 October Friendly	Morocco	1−2	Scotland	Casablanca, Morocco
19:30 UTC+1	Nakkach 80'	Report	Cuthbert 39'; Weir 88'	Stadium: Stade Pere Jego,

28 October Friendly	Morocco	3−0	Haiti	Casablanca, Morocco
19:30 UTC+1	Saoud 18'; Chebbak 50'; Jraïdi 70'	Report		Stadium: Stade Pere Jego,

28 November 2025 Friendly	Morocco	1–1	Burkina Faso	Marrakesh, Morocco
19:00 UTC+1	Jraïdi 45+1'	Report	Kabré 58'	Stadium: Marrakech Stadium

2 December 2025 Friendly	Morocco	0–2	South Africa	Agadir, Morocco
19:00 UTC+2	Mthandi 70'; Cesane 86'	Report		Stadium: Adrar Stadium

=== 2026 ===
27 February Friendly	Morocco	5–0	Burkina Faso	Rabat, Morocco
23:00 UTC+1	Mssoudy 4', 6'; Jraïdi 33', 57'; Mrabet 45'	Report		Stadium: Al Medina Stadium; Referee: Dorsaf Ganouati (Tunisia)

3 March Friendly	Morocco	1–1	Burkina Faso	Rabat, Morocco
23:00 UTC+1	Mssoudy 90+4'	Report	Kabré 80'	Stadium: Al Medina Stadium

7 March Friendly	Morocco	3–0	Cape Verde	Rabat, Morocco
21:00 UTC+1	Benzina 22'; Jraïdi 42'; Mssoudy 45+2'	Report		Stadium: Moulay El Hassan Stadium

13 April Friendly	Morocco	3–0	Tanzania	Rabat, Morocco
21:00 UTC+1	Mssoudy 4', 77'; Mrabet 80'	Report		Stadium: Moulay El Hassan Stadium

17 April Friendly	Morocco	Cancelled	Ghana	Rabat, Morocco
18:30 UTC+1				Stadium: Moulay El Hassan Stadium

17 April Friendly	Morocco	1–1	Mali	Rabat, Morocco
18:30 UTC+1	Jraïdi 61'	Report	A. Traoré 45+4'	Stadium: Moulay El Hassan Stadium; Referee: Dorsaf Ganouati (Tunisia)

5 June Friendly	Morocco	4–2	Benin	Rabat, Morocco
19:00 UTC+1	Jraïdi 13'; Ouzraoui 26' (pen.); Nakkach 43'; Nassi 80'	Report	Sadikou 23'; Fachinan 88'	Stadium: Moulay El Hassan Stadium

10 June Friendly	New Zealand	0–0	Morocco	Malaga, Spain
18:00 UTC+2				Stadium: Nuevo Estadio El Maulí

26 July 2026 2026 WAFCON GS	Morocco	4–0	Kenya	Rabat, Morocco
21:00 UTC+1	Ouzraoui 19'; Atiq 29'; Jraïdi 32', 47'	Report (FIFA)		Stadium: Moulay El Hassan Stadium; Referee: Vincentia Amedome (Togo)

30 July 2026 2026 WAFCON GS	Morocco	1–0	Algeria	Rabat, Morocco
21:00 UTC+1	Mssoudy 84'	Report (FIFA)		Stadium: Moulay El Hassan Stadium; Referee: Aline Guimbang Etong (Cameroon)

1 August 2026 WAFCON GS	Senegal	0–0	Morocco	Rabat, Morocco
21:00 UTC+1		Report (FIFA)		Stadium: Moulay El Hassan Stadium; Referee: Shamirah Nabadda (Uganda)

8 August 2026 WAFCON QF	Morocco	2–1	South Africa	Rabat, Morocco
21:00 UTC+1	Ouzraoui 31'; Aït El Haj 51' (pen.)	Report (FIFA)	Kgatlana 67'	Stadium: Moulay El Hassan Stadium; Referee: Josephine Wanjiku (Kenya)

12 August 2026 2026 WAFCON SF	Morocco	0–0 (a.e.t.) (1–3 p)	Cameroon	Rabat, Morocco
18:00 UTC+1		Report (FIFA)		Stadium: Moulay El Hassan Stadium; Referee: Vincentia Amedome (Togo)
	Penalties
	Aït El Haj (penalty scored); Chapelle (penalty missed); Atiq (penalty missed); Ouzraoui (penalty missed)		(penalty scored) Ngah Manga; (penalty missed) Mendoua; (penalty scored) Rose; (penalty scored) Nyadjou

15 August 2026 2026 WAFCON TPM	Morocco	1–1 (2–3 p)	Algeria	Rabat, Morocco
18:00 UTC+1	Azraf 37'	Report (FIFA)	Boussaha 83'	Stadium: Rabat Olympic Stadium; Referee: Josphine Wanjiku (Kenya)
	Penalties
	Redouani (penalty missed); Nakkach (penalty scored); Boutiebi (penalty scored); Mourtaji (penalty missed); Badri (penalty missed)		(penalty scored) Dafeur; (penalty missed) Braham; (penalty scored) Bekhaled; (penalty missed) Khezami; (penalty scored) Belloumou

9 October 2028 Summer Olympics qualifying	Congo	Cancelled	Morocco	Brazzaville, Congo
14:00 UTC+0		Report		Stadium: Alphonse Massemba-Débat Stadium

13 October 2028 Summer Olympics qualifying	Morocco	Cancelled	Congo	Morocco
19:00 UTC+0		Report

9 October Friendly	Morocco	3–1	Uzbekistan	Rabat, Morocco
	Jraïdi 65', 67', 79'		Khabibullaeva 16'	Stadium: Moulay El Hassan Stadium

12 October Friendly	Morocco	0–0	Uzbekistan	Rabat, Morocco
				Stadium: Al Medina Stadium

1 December Friendly	Morocco	v	Venezuela

5 December Friendly	France	v	Morocco	Montbéliard, France
21:10		Report		Stadium: Stade Auguste-Bonal

sources: "Morocco Results and Fixtures". Soccerway.com. "Morocco – Soccer – Team Profile". globalsportsarchive.

== Coaching staff ==
Position	Name
Head coach	(Spain) Jorge Vilda
Assistant coach	Vacant
Goalkeeping coach	Vacant
Fitness coach	(Morocco) Khadija Addal

=== Manager history ===
- (United States) Kelly Lindsey (2020)
- (France) Reynald Pedros (2020–2023)
- (Spain) Jorge Vilda (2023–present)

== Players ==
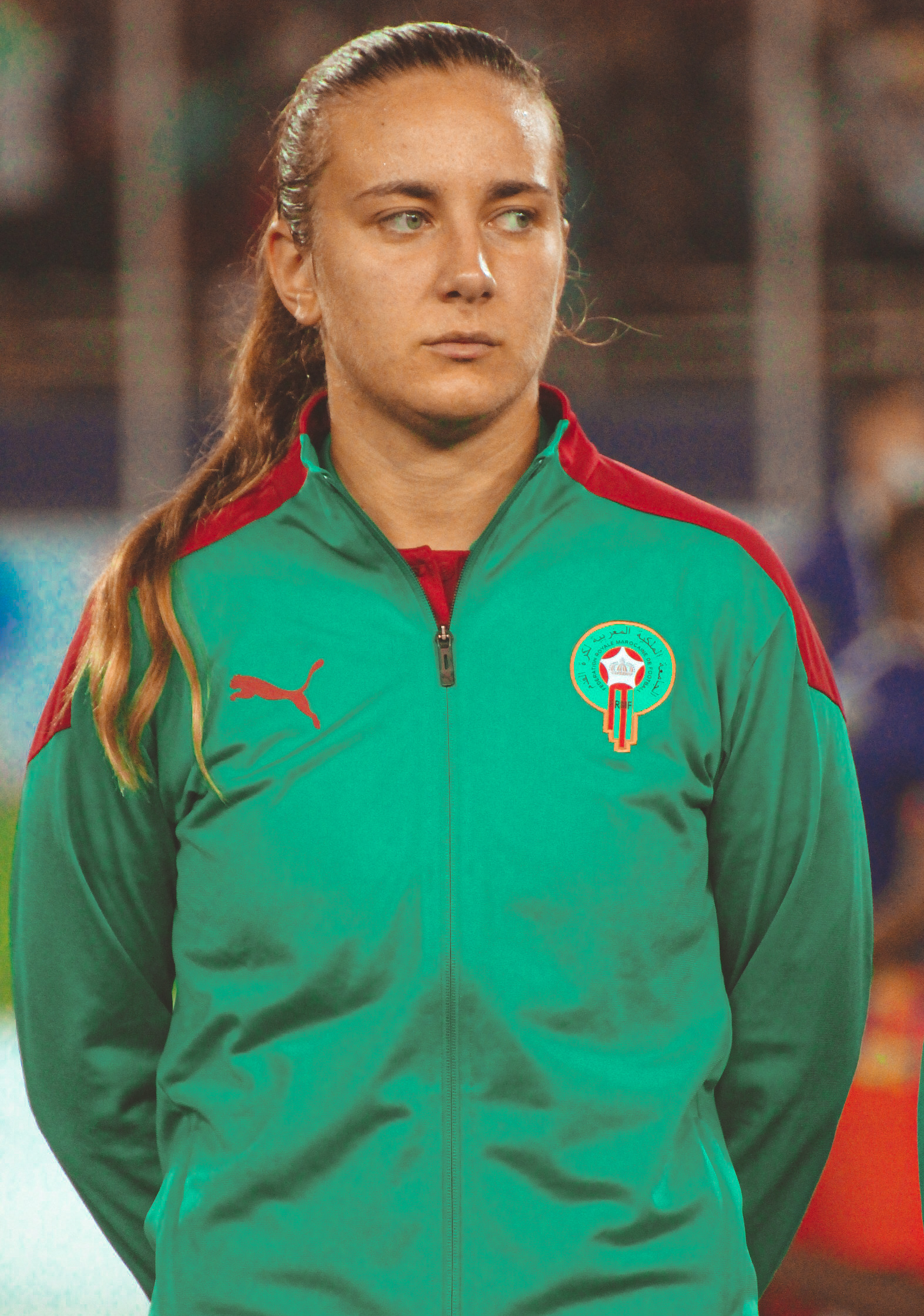
Yasmin Mrabet played numerous games for Morocco

=== Current squad ===
- The following 26 players were called up for the 2026 Women's Africa Cup of Nations from 26 July to 16 August 2026.

Caps and goals accurate as of 17 July 2026.

No.	Pos.	Player	Date of birth (age)	Club
1	GK	Khadija Er-Rmichi	16 September 1989 (aged 36)	(Royal Moroccan Football Federation) AS FAR
2	DF	Zineb Redouani	12 June 2000 (aged 26)	(Royal Moroccan Football Federation) AS FAR
3	DF	Nouhaila Benzina	11 May 1998 (aged 28)	(Royal Moroccan Football Federation) AS FAR
4	DF	Siham Boukhami	1 February 1992 (aged 34)	(Royal Moroccan Football Federation) AS FAR
5	DF	Nesryne El Chad	13 March 2003 (aged 23)	(French Football Federation) Lille
6	MF	Élodie Nakkach	20 January 1995 (aged 31)	(Swiss Football Association) Servette
7	MF	Ghizlane Chebbak (captain)	22 February 1990 (aged 36)	(Saudi Arabian Football Federation) Al-Hilal
8	FW	Kenza Chapelle	22 August 2002 (aged 23)	(French Football Federation) Le Mans
9	FW	Ibtissam Jraïdi	9 December 1992 (aged 33)	(Saudi Arabian Football Federation) Al-Ahli
10	MF	Najat Badri	19 May 1988 (aged 38)	(Royal Moroccan Football Federation) AS FAR
11	FW	Fatima Tagnaout	20 January 1999 (aged 27)	(Royal Moroccan Football Federation) AS FAR
12	GK	Fatima Zahra El Jebraoui	8 August 2007 (aged 18)	(Royal Moroccan Football Federation) SC Casablanca
13	FW	Chaymaa Mourtaji	8 December 1995 (aged 30)	(Royal Moroccan Football Federation) Union Touarga
14	DF	Aziza Rabbah	4 July 1986 (aged 40)	(Royal Moroccan Football Federation) AS FAR
15	MF	Hajar Saïd	22 May 2005 (aged 21)	(French Football Federation) Paris FC
16	DF	Maryame Atiq	24 January 1998 (aged 28)	(Royal Moroccan Football Federation) FUS Rabat
17	DF	Hanane Aït El Haj	2 November 1994 (aged 31)	(Royal Spanish Football Federation) Alavés
18	FW	Sanaâ Mssoudy	30 December 1999 (aged 26)	(Royal Moroccan Football Federation) AS FAR
19	FW	Sakina Ouzraoui Diki	29 August 2001 (aged 24)	(Royal Spanish Football Federation) Tenerife
20	FW	Imane Saoud	6 June 2002 (aged 24)	(French Football Federation) Nantes
21	MF	Yasmin Mrabet	8 August 1999 (aged 26)	(Royal Spanish Football Federation) Valencia
22	GK	Inès Arouaissa	30 June 2001 (aged 25)	(French Football Federation) Saint-Malo
23	FW	Jade Nassi	26 April 2003 (aged 23)	(French Football Federation) Le Havre
24	MF	Soumia Hady	30 June 1998 (aged 28)	(Royal Moroccan Football Federation) RS Berkane
25	DF	Rania Boutiebi	4 March 2004 (aged 22)	(Royal Belgian Football Association) Club YLA
26	FW	Kautar Azraf	3 January 2008 (aged 18)	(Royal Spanish Football Federation) Barcelona

=== Recent call-ups ===
The following players have been called up to the Morocco squad within the last 12 months and were not included in the final squad for the 2026 Women's Africa Cup of Nations.

Pos.	Player	Date of birth (age)	Caps	Goals	Club	Latest call-up
GK	Hind El Hasnaoui	13 September 1996 (age 30)	0	0	(Morocco) AS FAR	v. Burkina Faso, 28 November 2025
GK	Zineb El Arari	28 November 1999 (age 26)	0	0	(Morocco) RS Berkane	v. Burkina Faso, 28 November 2025
DF	Fatima El Ghazouani	11 May 2005 (age 21)	0	0	(Morocco) FUS Rabat	v. Burkina Faso, 28 November 2025
DF	Imane Touriss	11 February 2005 (age 21)	0	0	(Switzerland) Grasshopper Club Zürich	v. Burkina Faso, 28 November 2025
DF	Sabah Seghir	27 September 2000 (age 26)	5	0	(Switzerland) Basel	v. Burkina Faso, 28 November 2025
DF	Djennah Cherif	10 January 2006 (age 20)	0	0	(France) Thonon Evian	v. Uganda, 8 April 2025
DF	Ghizlane Chhiri	11 September 1994 (age 32)	7	0	(Morocco) AS FAR	v. Malawi, 19 June 2025
DF	Najet Belhabib	20 August 2001 (age 25)	0	0		v. Haiti, 28 October 2025
DF	Hanane Said	28 November 2002 (age 23)	0	0		v. Haiti, 28 October 2025
MF	Sarah Kassi	9 September 2003 (age 23)	5	0	(France) Le Havre	v. Burkina Faso, 28 November 2025
MF	Zineb Erroudany	1 November 2003 (age 23)	0	0	(Morocco) AS FAR	v. Burkina Faso, 28 November 2025
MF	Anissa Lahmari	17 February 1997 (age 29)	8	1	(Morocco) AS FAR	v. Burkina Faso, 28 November 2025
MF	Salma Bouguerch	4 November 1998 (age 28)	0	0	(Morocco) Wydad AC	v. Nigeria, 26 July 2025
MF	Salma Amani	28 November 1989 (age 36)	0	0	(United States) Brooklyn FC	v. Haiti, 28 October 2025
FW	Rosella Ayane	16 March 1996 (age 30)	31	10	(United States) Chicago Red Stars	v. Uganda, 8 April 2025

=== Previous squads ===
FIFA Women's World Cup

- 2023 FIFA Women's World Cup squads

Africa Women Cup of Nations

- 2000 African Women's Championship squad
- 2022 Africa Women Cup of Nations squad
- 2024 Africa Women Cup of Nations squad
- 2026 Africa Women Cup of Nations squad

UNAF Women's Tournament

- 2020 UNAF Women's Tournament squad

Malta International Women's Football Tournament

- 2022 Malta International Women's Football Tournament squads

== Competitive record ==
=== FIFA Women's World Cup ===
FIFA Women's World Cup record
Year	Result	GP	W	D*	L	GF	GA	GD
(China) 1991	did not enter							
(Sweden) 1995	did not enter							
(United States) 1999	did not qualify							
(United States) 2003	did not qualify							
(China) 2007	did not qualify							
(Germany) 2011	did not qualify							
(Canada) 2015	did not qualify							
(France) 2019	did not qualify							
(Australia) (New Zealand) 2023	Round of 16	4	2	0	2	2	10	–8
(Brazil) 2027	Qualified							
(Costa Rica) (Jamaica) (Mexico) (United States) 2031	To be determined							
(United Kingdom) 2035	To be determined							
Total	2/10	4	2	0	2	2	10	–8

=== Olympic Games ===
Summer Olympics record
Appearances: 0 / 6
Year	Result	GP	W	D	L	GF	GA	GD
(United States) 1996	Did not enter							
(Australia) 2000	Did not enter							
(Greece) 2004	Did not enter							
(China) 2008	Did not qualify							
(United Kingdom) 2012	Did not qualify							
(Brazil) 2016	Did not enter							
(Japan) 2020	Did not qualify							
(France) 2024	Did not qualify							
(United States) 2028	To be determined							
Total	-	0	0	0	0	0	0	0

=== Women's Africa Cup of Nations ===
Women's Africa Cup of Nations record
Appearances: 4 / 13
Year	Round	GP	W	D*	L	GS	GA	GD
(Nigeria) 1998	Group stage	3	1	1	1	4	9	−5
(South Africa) 2000	Group stage	3	0	0	3	1	13	−12
(Nigeria) 2002	did not qualify							
(South Africa) 2004	did not enter							
(Nigeria) 2006	did not qualify							
(Equatorial Guinea) 2008	did not qualify							
(South Africa) 2010	did not qualify							
(Equatorial Guinea) 2012	did not qualify							
(Namibia) 2014	did not qualify							
(Cameroon) 2016	did not qualify							
(Ghana) 2018	did not qualify							
(Republic of the Congo) 2020	Cancelled							
(Morocco) 2022	Runners-up	6	4	1	1	9	5	+4
(Morocco) 2024	Runners-up	6	3	2	1	13	9	+4
(Morocco) 2026	Fourth place	6	3	3	0	8	2	+6
Total	Runners-up	24	11	7	6	35	38	−3

*Draws include knockout matches decided on penalty kicks.

=== All-Africa Games ===
All-Africa Games record
Appearances: 0
Year	Round	Position	Pld	W	D	L	GF	GA
(Nigeria) 2003	Did not enter							
(Algeria) 2007	Did not enter							
(Mozambique) 2011	Did not enter							
(Republic of the Congo) 2015	Did not enter							
(Morocco) 2019	See Morocco women's national under-20 football team							
(Ghana) 2023	See Morocco women's national under-20 football team							
(Egypt) 2027	To be determined							
All Total		0/5	0	0	0	0	0	0

- 2019 and 2023 editions of the football tournament was played by the U-20 team.

See Morocco women's national under-20 football team

=== Arab Women's Cup ===
Morocco lost to Algeria in the championship game of the first Arab Women's Cup in 2006 after defeating host Egypt 4–2 in the semi-finals.

Arab Women's Cup record
Appearances: 1
Year	Round	Position	Pld	W	D	L	GF	GA	GD
(Egypt) 2006	Runners-up	2nd	4	2	1	1	12	3	+9
(Egypt) 2021	did not enter								
Total	Runners-up	1/1	4	2	1	1	12	3	+9

=== UNAF Women's Tournament ===
UNAF Women's Tournament record
Appearances: 1
Year	Round	Position	Pld	W	D	L	GF	GA	GD
(Tunisia) 2009	did not participate								
(Tunisia) 2020	Champion	1st	4	4	0	0	11	2	+9
Total	Champion	1/2	4	4	0	0	11	2	+9

== Honours ==
=== Major competitions ===
- Women's Africa Cup of Nations

Runners-up: 2022, 2024

=== Regional ===
- UNAF Women's Tournament

Champions: 2020

- Arab Women's Championship

Runners-up: 2006

- Aisha Buhari Cup

Runners-up: 2021

=== Other ===
- Malta International Women's Football Tournament

Champions: 2022

=== Awards ===
- African Women's National Team of the Year

(silver) Second place: 2022, 2023, 2025

== See also ==
- Sport in Morocco
  - Football in Morocco
    - Women's football in Morocco
- Morocco women's national under-17 football team
- Morocco women's national under-20 football team
- Cultural significance of the Atlas lion
- Morocco national football team
- Morocco A' national football team
- Morocco national under-23 football team
- Morocco national under-20 football team
- Morocco national under-17 football team

=== Other football codes ===
- Morocco national futsal team
- Morocco national beach soccer team
