= Inès Arouaissa =

Moroccan footballer (born 2001)

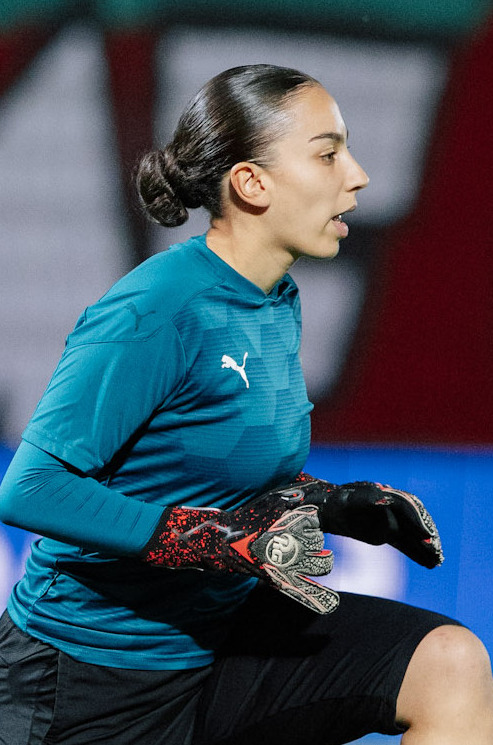
- Arouaissa with Morocco in 2024

Personal information
- Date of birth: 30 June 2001 (age 25)
- Place of birth: Dijon, France
- Height: 1.73 m (5 ft 8 in)
- Position: Goalkeeper

Team information
- Current team: Saint-Malo
- Number: 16

Youth career
- 2016–2020: Marseille

Senior career*
Years	Team	Apps	(Gls)
2019–2021	Marseille	0	(0)
2022–2024	Cannes	38	(0)
2024–	Saint-Malo	7	(0)

International career
2021–	Morocco		
- * Club domestic league appearances and goals as of 10 December 2025.

Inès Chiama Arouaissa (Arabic: إيناس أرويسة; born 30 June 2001) is a professional footballer who plays as a goalkeeper for Première Ligue club Saint-Malo. Born in France, she represents Morocco at international level.

== Club career ==
Arouaissa is a Marseille product, which she joined in 2016.

== International career ==
Arouaissa made her senior debut for Morocco on 10 June 2021 in a 3–0 friendly home win over Mali. She was selected for both the 2023 FIFA Women's World Cup and 2024 Women's Africa Cup of Nations.

== Honours ==
Morocco

- Women's Africa Cup of Nations runner-up: 2024

== See also ==
- List of Morocco women's international footballers
