= Monique Ngock =

Cameroonian footballer (born 2004)

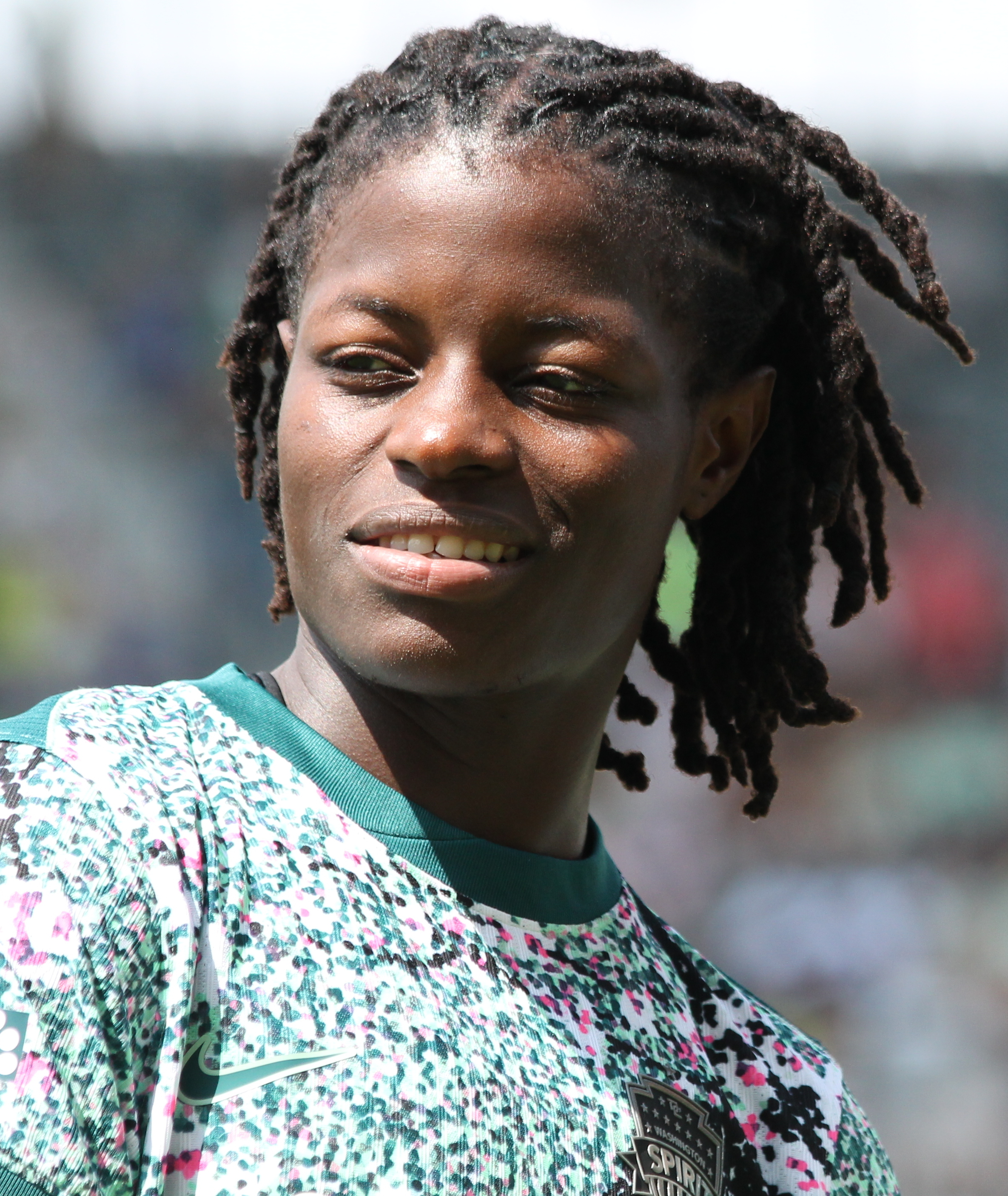
- Ngock with the Washington Spirit in 2026

Personal information
- Date of birth: 17 September 2004 (age 22)
- Place of birth: Mfou, Cameroon
- Position: Midfielder

Team information
- Current team: Washington Spirit
- Number: 8

Senior career*
Years	Team	Apps	(Gls)
2022–2025	Reims	53	(2)
2025–2026	Fleury	19	(2)
2026–	Washington Spirit	8	(0)

International career^{‡}
2022–	Cameroon	7	(0)
Medal record
Women's Africa Cup of Nations
Gold medal – first place	2026 Morocco
- * Club domestic league appearances and goals as of 05:28, 15 November 2026 (UTC) ‡ National team caps and goals as of 10 November 2024

Monique Ngock (born 17 September 2004) is a Cameroonian professional footballer who plays as a midfielder for the Washington Spirit of the National Women's Soccer League (NWSL) and the Cameroon national team. She previously played in the Première Ligue for Reims and Fleury.

== Club career ==
On 9 July 2026, Ngock joined National Women's Soccer League (NWSL) club Washington Spirit for an undisclosed transfer fee, signing a three-year contract.

== International career ==
Ngock made her debut with the Cameroon national team in 2022. As a 17-year-old, she was called up to the squad for the 2022 Women's Africa Cup of Nations, in which Cameroon made the quarter-finals. Ngock was part of the Cameroon side that lifted the 2026 Women's Africa Cup of Nations, winning the trophy for the first time in the history of the national team. Ngock was named Player of the Tournament for her performances.

== Honours ==
Cameroon

- Women's Africa Cup of Nations: 2026

Individual

- Women's Africa Cup of Nations Player of the Tournament: 2026
