= Ibtissam Bouharat =

Moroccan footballer (born 1990)

Personal information
- Date of birth: 2 January 1990 (age 36)
- Place of birth: Londerzeel, Belgium
- Position: Midfielder

Team information
- Current team: KV Malines

Senior career*
Years	Team	Apps	(Gls)
2012–2013	Standard Liège		
2013–2014	RSC Anderlecht		
2014–2016	PSV		
2022–	KV Malines	15	(2)

International career
- Morocco
- * Club domestic league appearances and goals

Ibtissam Bouharat (Arabic: إبتسام بوحرات; born 2 January 1990) is a footballer who plays as a midfielder for KV Malines. Born in Belgium, she represents Morocco at international level.

== Career ==
Bouharat started her career with Dilbeek Sport. In 2005 she traveled to Brussels to join RSC Anderlecht and began her professional career from there. She moved again in the summer of 2006 to KV Mechelen. In three years at Mechelen, Bouharat did not go beyond sitting on the bench as a reserve player. That caused her to take a different direction to join a new club, DVK Haacht. In the summer of 2010, she stopped playing in the Tweede Klasse and went for a year to play for Eva's Tienen. On 25 May 2011 she starred with Romelu Lukaku, Vadis Odjidja, Faris Haroun and François Kompany in a charity match against Racism. She played until 30 June 2011 in Tienen and then joined the women's football division of Lierse SK. Since 20 May 2012 she is under contract with Standard Liège. After Bouharat scored in 13 games and 2 goals for Standard Feminina, she left Liège and moved to RSC Anderlecht in Brussels.

== See also ==
- List of Morocco women's international footballers
