= Fatima Zohra Gharbi =

Moroccan footballer (born 2001)

Personal information
- Full name: Fatima Zohra Gharbi Berrima
- Date of birth: 15 May 2001 (age 25)
- Place of birth: Tangier, Morocco
- Height: 1.57 m (5 ft 2 in)
- Position: Midfielder

International career
Years	Team	Apps	(Gls)
- Morocco

Fatima Zohra Gharbi Berrima (born 15 May 2001) is a Moroccan footballer who plays as a winger for the Morocco women's national team.
