= Maëva Nyadjou =

Cameroonian footballer (born 2006)

- Nyadjou with the Kansas City Current in 2026

Personal information
- Full name: Myriam Maëva Nyadjou Wamen
- Date of birth: 14 October 2006 (age 20)
- Position: Defender

Team information
- Current team: Kansas City Current
- Number: 28

Senior career*
Years	Team	Apps	(Gls)
- Amazone FAP
2026–	Kansas City Current	0	(0)

International career^{‡}
2025–	Cameroon U20	6	(5)
2025–	Cameroon	9	(1)
Medal record
Women's Africa Cup of Nations
Gold medal – first place	2026 Morocco
- * Club domestic league appearances and goals ‡ National team caps and goals as of 9 August 2026

Myriam Maëva Nyadjou Wamen (born 14 October 2006) is a Cameroonian footballer who plays a defender for the Kansas City Current of the National Women's Soccer League (NWSL) and the Cameroon national team.

== Club career ==
Nyadjou grew up in Yaoundé, Cameroon. She has played at the club level in her hometown for Cameroonian Guinness Super League team Amazone FAP.

On 3 September 2026, the Kansas City Current of the National Women's Soccer League announced the signing of Nyadjou through 2029.

== International career ==
Nyadjou represented Cameroon at under-20 level, captaining the team during the 2026 African U-20 Women's World Cup qualification campaign. She scored five goals across Cameroon's six matches in the qualifying tournament.

Nyadjou received her first call-up to the senior national team in April 2025 for a friendly match against Morocco. She made her international debut as a starter against Algeria in the 2026 WAFCON qualifiers on 23 October 2025. On 9 August, she scored her first international goal against Nigeria in the quarter-finals, sending Cameroon through to the semi-finals and securing their qualification for the World Cup. She went on to win the tournament with Cameroon.

== International goals ==
Scores and results list Cameroon's goal tally first, score column indicates score after each Nyadjou goal.

No.	Date	Venue	Opponent	Score	Result	Competition
1	10 August 2026	Larbi Zaouli Stadium, Casablanca, Morocco	Nigeria	1–0	1–0	2026 Women's Africa Cup of Nations

== Honors ==
Kansas City Current

- NWSL Championship: 2026
