= Vincentia Amedome =

Togolese football referee (born 1981)

- Full name: Vincentia Enyonam Amedome
- Born: 10 August 1981 (age 45); Togo

International
Years	League	Role
2015–	FIFA	Referee

Vincentia Enyonam Amedome (born 10 August 1981) is an international football referee from Togo who is a listed international referee for FIFA since 2015. She officiates for FIFA, the Togolese Championnat National, the Togolese Women's Championship, and the Togolese Football Federation (FTF).

In 2022, she became the first Togolese referee to be appointed to the biennial African Nations Championship (CHAN) men's football tournament in Algeria in 2020, following in the footsteps of Ethiopian trailblazer Lidya Tafesse.

Amedome has also officiated at the CAF Women's Africa Cup of Nations in Morocco, the FIFA U-20 Women's World Cup in Costa Rica, and the final of the CAF Women's Champions League in 2022.

On 9 January 2023, FIFA appointed her to the officiating pool for the 2023 FIFA Women's World Cup in Australia.
