= US Saint-Malo (women) =

- Full name: Union Sportive Saint-Malo Féminines
- Nickname: les Diablesses
- Founded: 1994; 32 years ago
- Ground: Stade de Marville, Saint-Malo
- Capacity: 2,500
- Manager: Roland Jamelot
- League: Première Ligue
- 2025–26: Seconde Ligue, 2nd of 12 (promoted)
- Website: ussm.fr
Home colours	Away colours

Union Sportive Saint-Malo Féminines, the women's section of US Saint-Malo, is a French women's football club based in Saint-Malo, the club competes in the Première Ligue, the top flight of women's football in France.

== History ==
The women's section of US Saint-Malo was founded in 1994 by Anne Lenouvel and Sophie Lasne, for their debut the team entered the district championship for the 1995–1996 season. They progressed to Brittany Division d'Honneur in their third season. After 17 seasons in Division d'Honneur, the team achieved promotion to Division 2 in 2014.

From their debut season, where they finished 7th, les Diablesses finished in the top 4 for the next six editions. However, their performance dropped to 7th in the 2021–22 season and 8th in 2022–23, resulting in their relegation from Division 2 to the third tier for the first time in nine years.

After being relegated from Division 2 last season, the club won Group A of Division 3 in the 2023–24 season and earned promotion back to Division 2.

== Players ==
=== Current squad ===
As of 17 November 2024

Note: Flags indicate national team as defined under FIFA eligibility rules; some limited exceptions apply. Players may hold more than one non-FIFA nationality.

No.	Pos.	Nation	Player
1	GK	FRA	Louise Thiery
3	DF	FRA	Élisa Aubert
4	DF	FRA	Laure Robert
5	MF	TUN	Norhène Bettoumi
6	MF	FRA	Florie Saint-Cricq
8	MF	FRA	Jeanne Dumets
9	FW	FRA	Coumba Gaucher Diallo
10	DF	FRA	Pamela Babinga
11	FW	FRA	Kelly Koné
12	DF	SEN	Safietou Sagna

No.	Pos.	Nation	Player
14	MF	FRA	Laura Rueda
16	GK	MAR	Inès Arouaissa
19	FW	ALG	Morgane Ikene
17	FW	FRA	Charlotte Boisneau
22	DF	FRA	Élodie Dinglor
23	DF	FRA	Marie-Anne Fixot
24	MF	FRA	Emeline Minot
27	FW	FRA	Ananée Yeboah
29	DF	NGR	Maureen Umeugochukwu

== Honours ==
=== Domestic ===
- Division 3 Féminine
  - Winners (1): 2023–24
