= Togolese Women's Championship =

- Founded: 2000; 26 years ago
- Country: Togo
- Confederation: CAF
- Number of clubs: 16
- International cup: CAF W-Champions League
- Current champions: ASKO de Kara Féminines (2023-24)
- Current: 2025–26 W-Championship

The Togolese Women's Championship is the top flight of women's association football in Togo. The competition is run by the Togo Football Federation.

== History ==
The first Togolese women's championship was contested in 2000. It was won by AS OTR Lomé previously known as Academie Amis du Monde. The real start of the Togolese women's championship as it is now is in 2017 after two editions as just one match between the two local championship winner.

== Champions ==
The list of champions and runners-up:

Year	Champions	Runners-up
2000	AS OTR Lomé	Vibration
2015	Athlèta de Lomé	AS OTR Lomé
2016-2017	Athlèta de Lomé	Bella FC
2018-2019	AS OTR Lomé	Bella FC
2019-2020	not held	
2021	Athlèta de Lomé	Djabir
2022	AS OTR Lomé	Athlèta de Lomé
2023	AS OTR Lomé	ASKO de Kara Féminines
