= Élodie Nakkach =

Moroccan footballer (born 1995)

Élodie Nakkach إيلودي النقاش
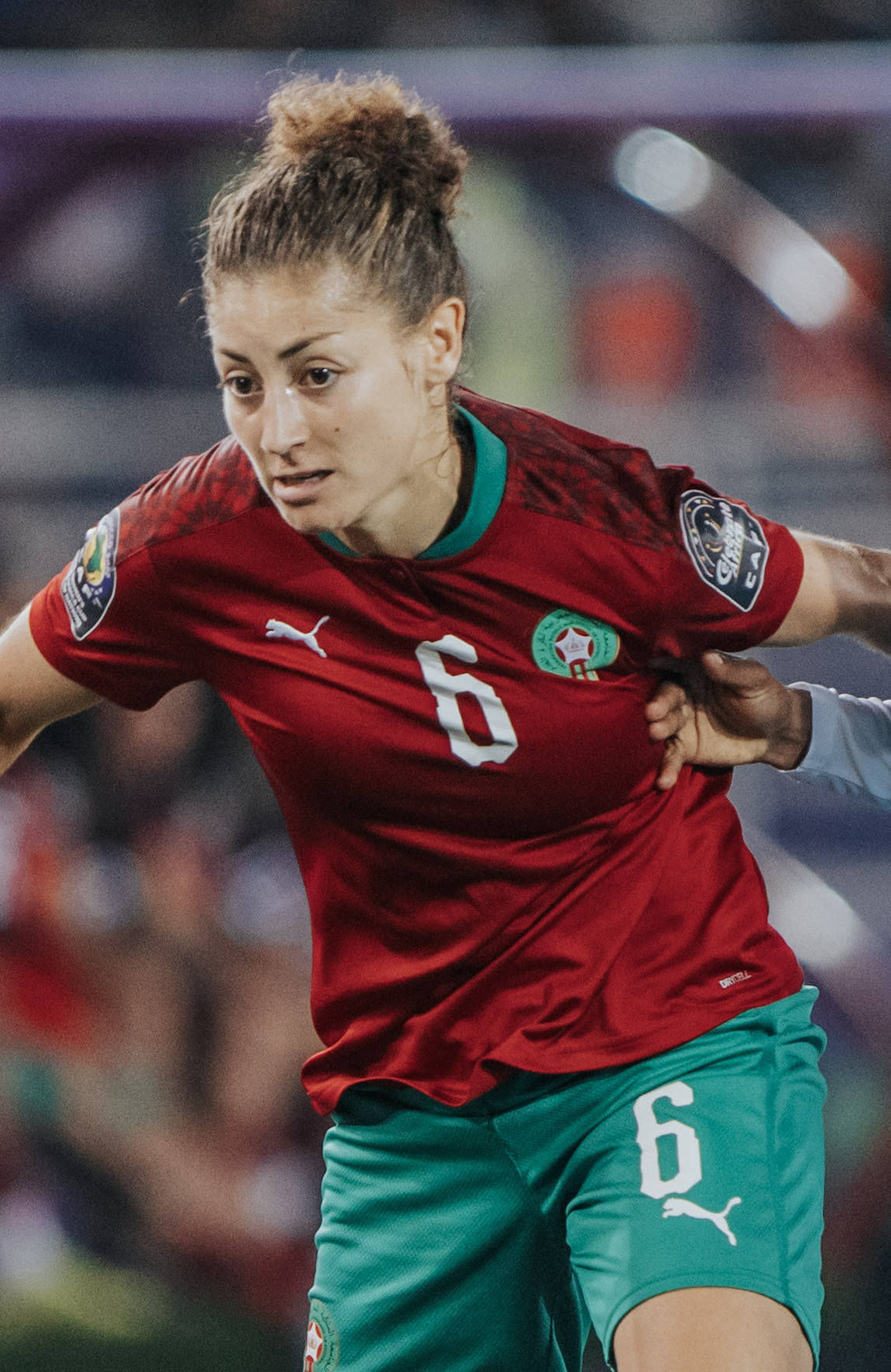
- Nakkach with Morocco at the 2022 Women's Africa Cup of Nations

Personal information
- Full name: Nahla Élodie Nakkach
- Date of birth: 20 January 1995 (age 31)
- Place of birth: Limoges, France
- Height: 1.62 m (5 ft 4 in)
- Position: Midfielder

Team information
- Current team: Servette
- Number: 66

Senior career*
Years	Team	Apps	(Gls)
2010–2011	Limoges Landouge	18	(3)
2011–2012	Soyaux	2	(0)
2012–2016	La Roche-sur-Yon	64	(13)
2016–2017	Soyaux	35	(2)
2018–2021	Dijon	71	(4)
2021–2024	Servette	92	(7)
2024–2025	Al Ahli	17	(3)
2025–	Servette	14	(0)

International career^{‡}
2017–	Morocco		
Medal record
Representing Morocco
Women's Africa Cup of Nations
Second place	2022 Morocco
Second place	2024 Morocco
- * Club domestic league appearances and goals as of 2 December 2025 ‡ National team caps and goals as of 5 March 2024

Nahla Élodie Nakkach (Arabic: نهلة إيلودي النقاش; born 20 January 1995) is a professional footballer who plays as a midfielder for Servette. Born in France, she represents Morocco at international level.

== Early and personal life ==
She was born and raised in France to Moroccan parents, she caps for the Morocco women's national team. She appeared in Adidas Women's World Cup adverts.

== International career ==
Nakkach was capped for Morocco at senior level during the 2018 Women's Africa Cup of Nations qualification, 2022 Women's Africa Cup of Nations, and the 2023 FIFA Women's World Cup.

== International goals ==
No.	Date	Venue	Opponent	Score	Result	Competition
1.	1 December 2023	Père Jégo Stadium, Casablanca, Morocco	Uganda	1–1	1–1	Friendly
2.	5 December 2023	Moulay Hassan Stadium, Rabat, Morocco	Uganda	1–0	3–0	Friendly
3.	24 October 2025	Père Jégo Stadium, Casablanca, Morocco	Scotland	1–1	1–2	Friendly
4.	5 June 2026	Moulay Hassan Stadium, Rabat, Morocco	Benin	3–1	4–2	Friendly

== Honours ==
Servette

- Swiss Women's Super League: 2023–24
- Swiss Women's Cup: 2023, 2024, 2026

Al-Ahli

- SAFF Women's Cup: 2024–25

Morocco

- Women's Africa Cup of Nations runner-up: 2022, 2024
- Malta International Tournament: 2022

== See also ==
- List of Morocco women's international footballers
