= Algeria–Morocco football rivalry =

International sports rivalry

- Location: CAF (Africa); UNAF (North Africa)
- Teams: Algeria; Morocco
- First meeting: Algeria 3–1 Morocco; Friendly; 12 September 1962
- Latest meeting: Morocco 2–2 Algeria; 2021 FIFA Arab Cup; 11 December 2021

Statistics
- Total meetings: 30
- All-time series: Algeria: 10; Draw: 11; Morocco: 10

The Algeria–Morocco football rivalry is a football rivalry between the national football teams of Algeria and Morocco, having achieved four Africa Cup of Nations and two Arab Cups between the two countries.

== Background ==
The football rivalry between Algeria and Morocco is deeply intertwined with the political standoff between the two nations. Relations between Algeria and Morocco have long been strained due to political differences due to the Sand War and feuds over Western Sahara, the latter saw Algeria backed the self-proclaimed Sahrawi Arab Democratic Republic led by Polisario against Morocco. In 2021, Algeria and Morocco severed diplomatic ties and have maintained the standoff since.

Several football incidents have also been related to this standoff. During the 2022 Mediterranean Games in Oran, two Moroccan journalists were denied entry to watch Morocco's football games, sparking outrage in Morocco. In 2023, then-defending champions Morocco withdrew from the 2022 African Nations Championship hosted in Algeria after Algeria refused to open airspace for Moroccan carrier. A year later, a supposed 2023–24 CAF Confederation Cup semi-final game between USM Alger and RS Berkane was unable to take part after a shirt dispute, with the Moroccan representative wearing their jerseys supporting Moroccan claim of Western Sahara; subsequently, USM Alger was disqualified and Berkane walked straight to the final.

Year	Algeria		Morocco	
Year	Qualification	Round	Qualification	Round
(Mexico) 1970	Did not qualify – First round loser	—N/a	Qualified – Final round winner	Group stage
(Spain) 1982	Qualified – Final round winner	Group stage	Did not qualify – Final round loser	—N/a
(Mexico) 1986	Qualified – Final round winner	Group stage	Qualified – Final round winner	Round of 16
(United States) 1994	Did not qualify – Second round loser	—N/a	Qualified – Second round winner	Group stage
(France) 1998	Did not qualify – First round loser	—N/a	Qualified – Final round winner	Group stage
(South Africa) 2010	Qualified – Tiebreaking play-off winner	Group stage	Did not qualify – Third round loser	—N/a
(Brazil) 2014	Qualified – Third round winner	Round of 16	Did not qualify – Second round loser	—N/a
(Russia) 2018	Did not qualify – Third round loser	—N/a	Qualified – Third round winner	Group stage
(Qatar) 2022	Did not qualify – Third round loser	—N/a	Qualified – Third round winner	Fourth place
(Canada) (Mexico) (United States) 2026	Qualified – CAF Group G winner	Round of 32	Qualified – CAF Group E winner	Quarter-Finals

== Matches ==
While both Algeria and Morocco are frequent participants in the Africa Cup of Nations, the two nations have only twice participated together at the FIFA World Cup, which occurred in 1986 and 2026. They've also faced just twice in the FIFA World Cup qualification, which occurred in the 2002 FIFA World Cup qualification.

#	Date	Location	Home Team	Score	Away team	Competition
1	12 September 1962	Algiers, Algeria	Algeria	3–1	Morocco	Friendly
2	31 October 1965	Algiers, Algeria	Algeria	0–0	Morocco	Friendly
3	6 March 1966	Casablanca, Morocco	Morocco	1–0	Algeria	Friendly
4	24 November 1966	Algiers, Algeria	Algeria	2–2	Morocco	Friendly
5	11 September 1967	Tunis, Tunisia	Algeria	3–1	Morocco	1967 Mediterranean Games
6	17 March 1968	Casablanca, Morocco	Morocco	0–0	Algeria	Friendly
7	9 March 1969	Algiers, Algeria	Algeria	2–0	Morocco	1970 African Cup of Nations qualification
8	22 March 1969	Agadir, Morocco	Morocco	1–0	Algeria	1970 African Cup of Nations qualification
9	31 October 1969	Algiers, Algeria	Algeria	1–0	Morocco	Friendly
10	10 December 1970	Algiers, Algeria	Algeria	3–1	Morocco	1972 African Cup of Nations qualification
11	27 December 1970	Casablanca, Morocco	Morocco	3–0	Algeria	1972 African Cup of Nations qualification
12	31 October 1973	Algiers, Algeria	Algeria	2–0	Morocco	Friendly
13	7 April 1974	Casablanca, Morocco	Morocco	2–0	Algeria	Friendly
14	31 October 1974	Algiers, Algeria	Algeria	0–0	Morocco	Friendly
15	9 December 1979	Casablanca, Morocco	Morocco	1–5	Algeria	1980 Summer Olympics qualification
16	7 April 1974	Algiers, Algeria	Algeria	3–0	Morocco	1980 Summer Olympics qualification
17	13 March 1980	Ibadan, Nigeria	Algeria	1–0	Morocco	1980 African Cup of Nations
18	8 March 1986	Alexandria, Egypt	Algeria	0–0	Morocco	1986 African Cup of Nations
19	16 March 1988	Casablanca, Morocco	Morocco	1–0	Algeria	1988 African Cup of Nations
20	26 March 1988	Casablanca, Morocco	Morocco	1–1 (3–4 p)	Algeria	1988 African Cup of Nations
21	22 March 1989	Béjaïa, Algeria	Algeria	1–1	Morocco	Friendly
22	25 May 1989	Kenitra, Morocco	Morocco	1–0	Algeria	Friendly
23	3 April 1991	Annaba, Algeria	Algeria	2–2	Morocco	Friendly
24	26 December 1991	Casablanca, Morocco	Morocco	1–1	Algeria	Friendly
25	22 September 1993	Rabat, Morocco	Morocco	0–0	Algeria	Friendly
26	9 July 2000	Fes, Morocco	Morocco	2–1	Algeria	2002 FIFA World Cup qualification
27	4 May 2001	Algiers, Algeria	Algeria	1–2	Morocco	2002 FIFA World Cup qualification
28	8 February 2004	Sfax, Tunisia	Morocco	3–1 (a.e.t.)	Algeria	2004 African Cup of Nations
29	27 March 2011	Annaba, Algeria	Algeria	1–0	Morocco	2012 Africa Cup of Nations qualification
30	4 June 2011	Marrakesh, Morocco	Morocco	4–0	Algeria	2012 Africa Cup of Nations qualification
31	11 December 2021	Doha, Qatar	Morocco	2–2 (3–5 p)	Algeria	2021 FIFA Arab Cup

== See also ==
- Algeria–Morocco relations
