= Dorsaf Ganouati =

Tunisian football referee

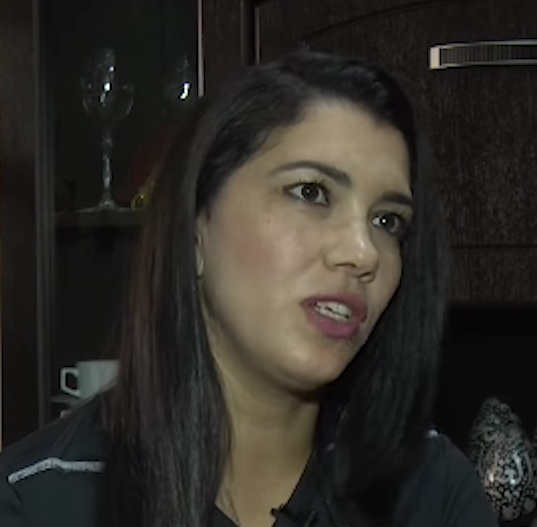
Dorsaf Ganouati

Dorsaf Ganouati (Arabic: درصاف الجنواتي; born 10 February 1984) is a Tunisian football referee.

== Early life ==
Ganouati played handball.

== Career ==
In 2019, Ganouati became the first woman to referee a professional men's game in Tunisia.

== Personal life ==
Ganouati worked as a physical education teacher.
