= Rania Boutiebi =

Belgian Moroccan football player (born 2004)

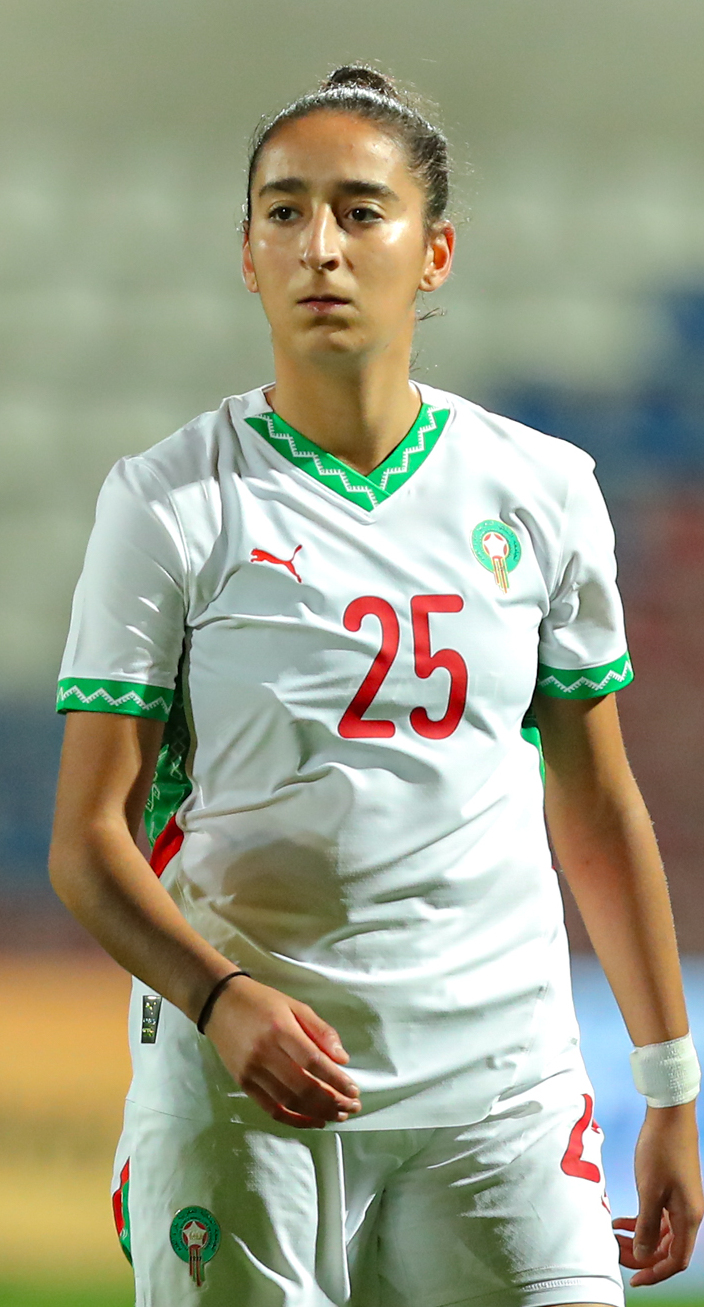
- Bouguerch playing for the Morocco national team against Mali in 2024

Personal information
- Date of birth: 4 March 2004 (age 22)
- Place of birth: Ghent, Belgium
- Height: 1.62 m (5 ft 4 in)
- Position: Forward

Team information
- Current team: Club Brugge
- Number: 11

Youth career
- Gent

Senior career*
Years	Team	Apps	(Gls)
2020–2022	Gent	28	(2)
2022–	Club Brugge	91	(17)

International career^{‡}
2018–2019	Belgium U15	3	(0)
2020	Belgium U16	1	(0)
2021–2023	Belgium U19	18	(3)
2023	Belgium U23	3	(0)
2024–	Morocco U20	3	(0)
2024–	Morocco		
- * Club domestic league appearances and goals as of 6 July 2025 ‡ National team caps and goals as of 6 July 2025

Rania Boutiebi (Arabic: رانيا بوطيبي; born 4 March 2004) is a professional footballer who plays as a forward for Belgian Women's Super League (BWSL) club Club Brugge. Born in Belgium, she represents Morocco internationally.

== International career ==
Boutiebi is eligible to represent either Belgium (her country of birth) or Morocco (through her Moroccan ancestry).

=== Morocco ===
Boutiebi was first called up for Morocco for a two-legged tie against rivals Tunisia in the third round of qualifying for the 2024 Summer Olympics in France.

Boutiebi was not part of Morocco's 24-player squad for the 2024 Women's Africa Cup of Nations on home soil, but was listed as a reserve player.
