= Al Medina Stadium =

Football stadium in Rabat, Morocco

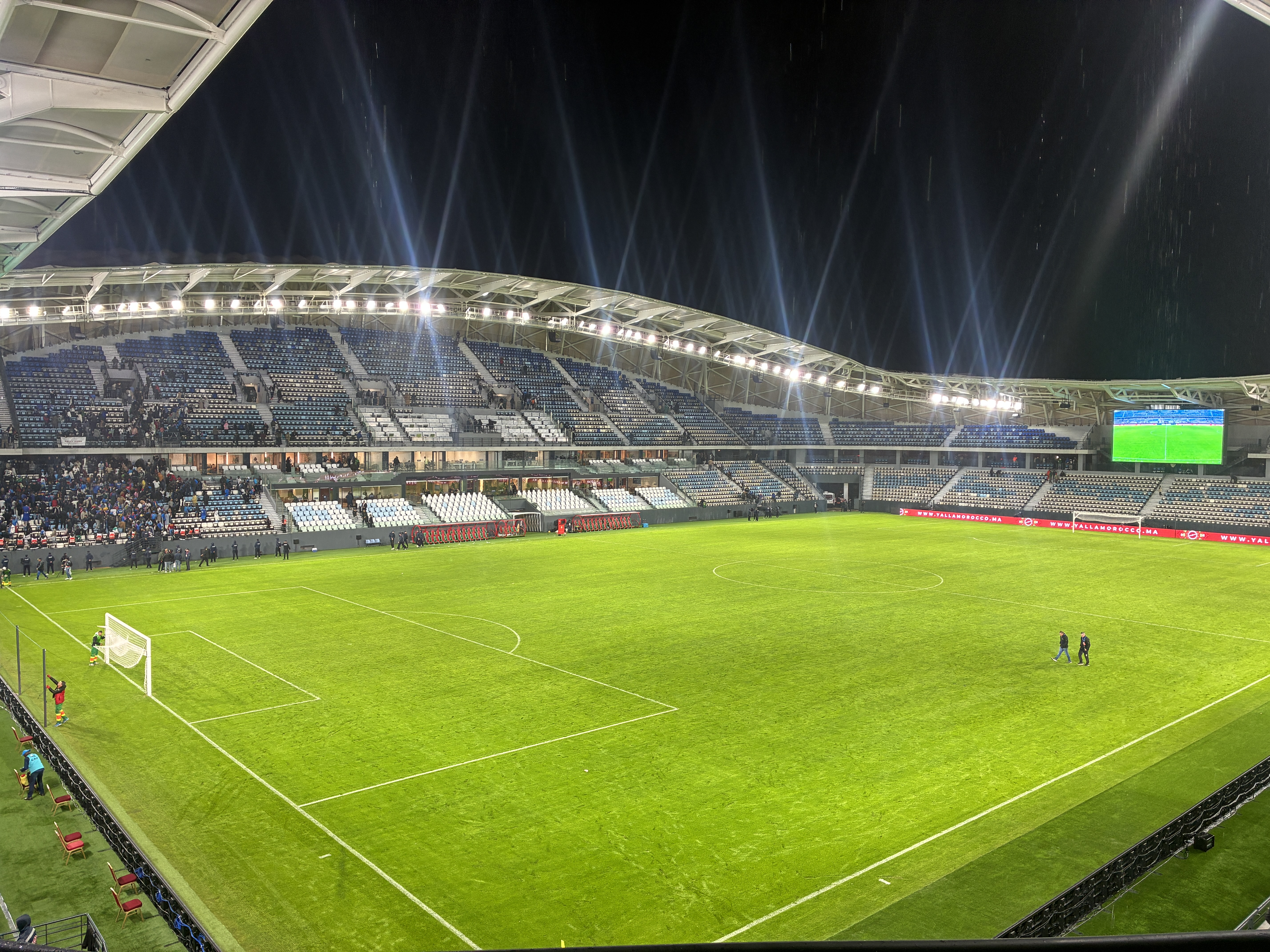
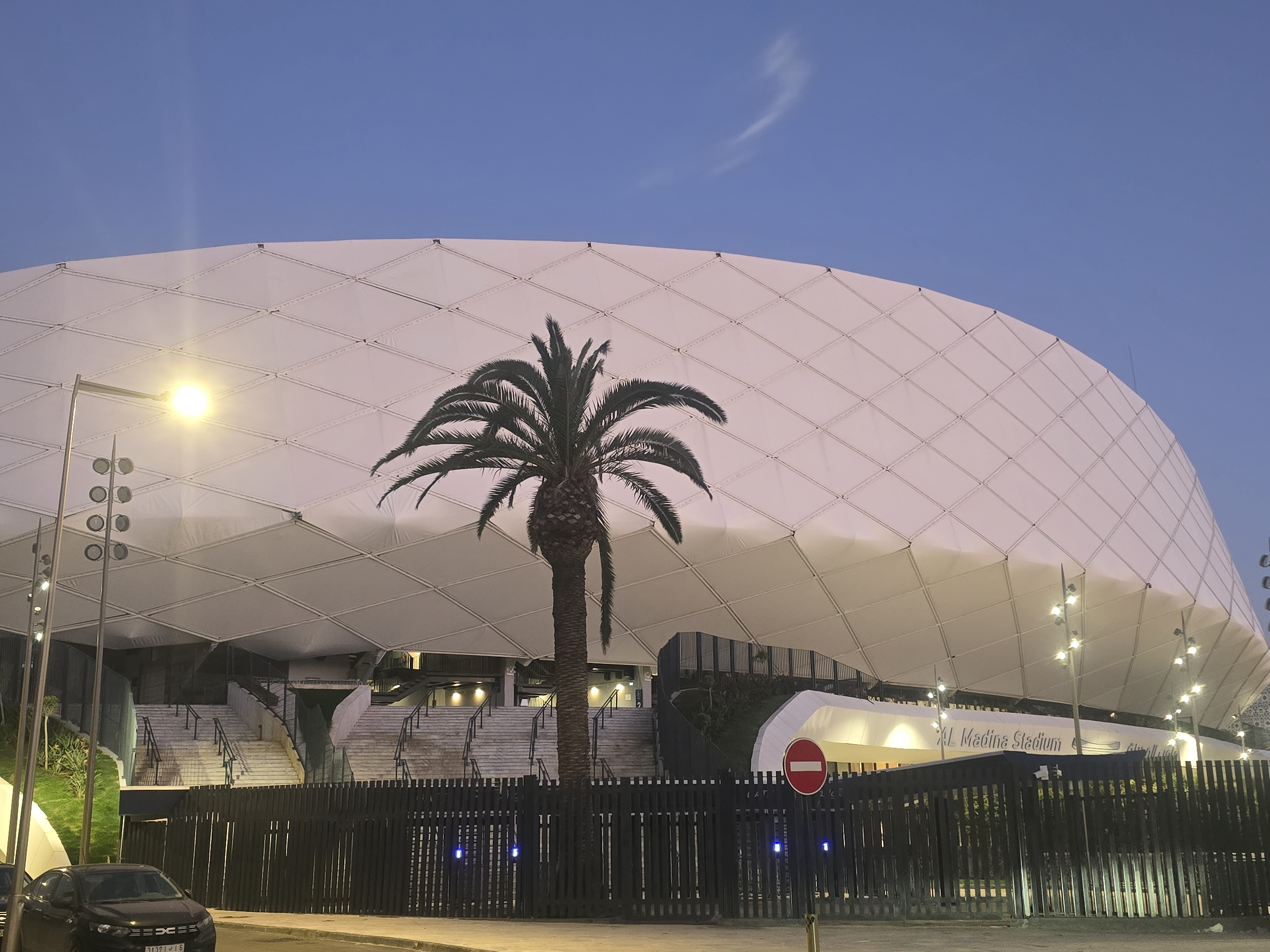
- Interactive map of Al Medina Stadium
- Former names: Al Barid Stadium (2025)
- Address: Ibn Khaldoun Street
- Location: Rabat, Morocco
- Coordinates: 34.005475°N 6.845550°W
- Owner: Ministry of Sports of Morocco
- Capacity: 18,000
- Public transit: T1 Madinat Al Irfane station L38 Tamesna – (via Hay Riad)

Construction
- Groundbreaking: 2024
- Opened: 2025
- Cost: €60,000,000
- Architect: AIA Life Designers

Tenants
- UTS Rabat (2026–present); Morocco national football team (selected matches)

Al Medina Stadium (Arabic: ملعب المدينة) is a football stadium in Rabat, Morocco. It is the home stadium of UTS Rabat. It served as one of the venues of the 2025 African Cup of Nations.

The stadium is built to FIFA specifications with a total capacity of 18,000. There is a roof to cover the spectators from rain and sun. There are sections for VVIP access for players, then the west facade accommodates for VIPs, journalists, stadium administration and also for medical services.
