= Rabat Olympic Stadium =

Football stadium in Rabat, Morocco

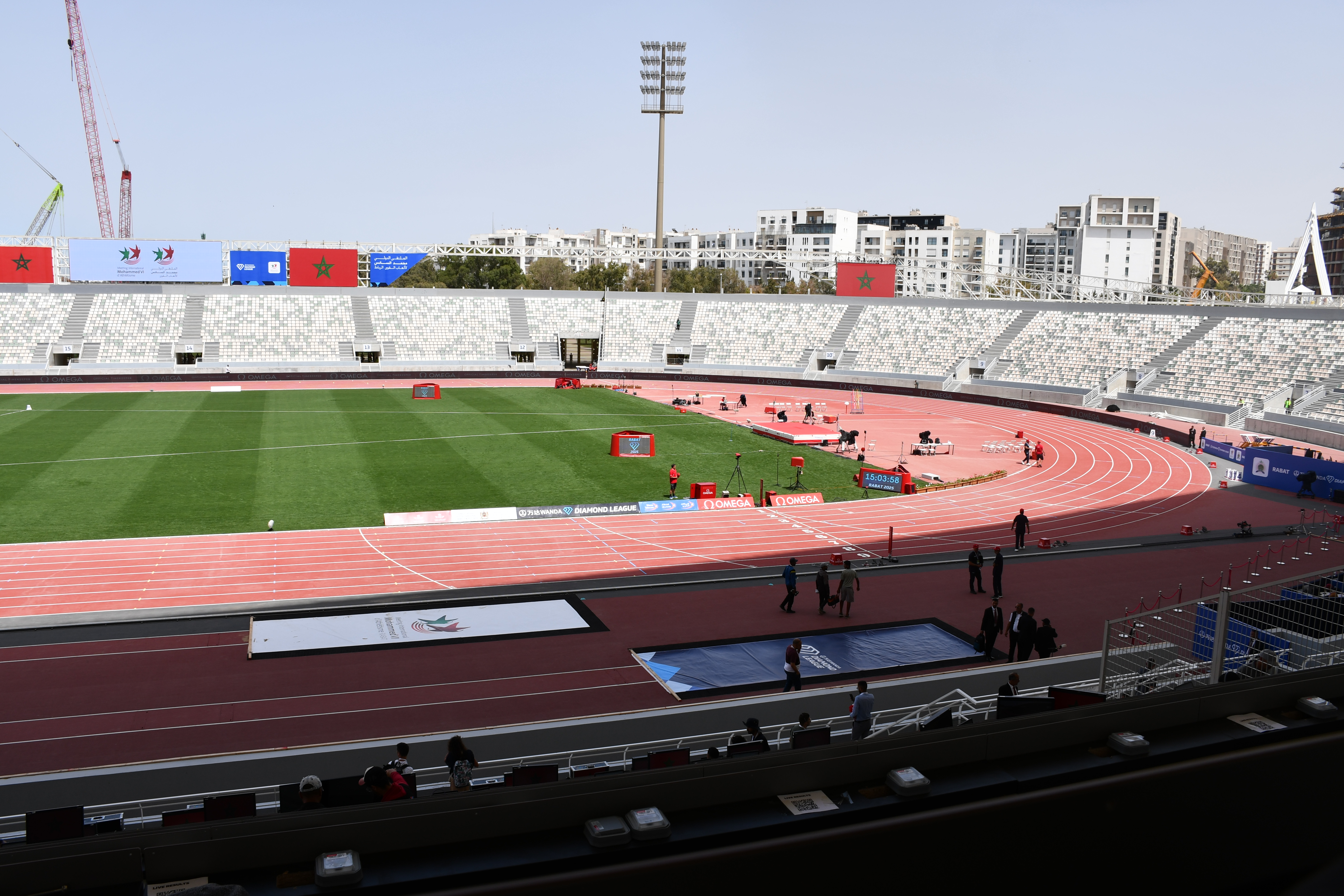
- Interactive map of Rabat Olympic Stadium
- Full name: Rabat Olympic Stadium
- Address: Rabat, Rabat-Salé-Kénitra, Morocco
- Owner: Province of Rabat; Royal Moroccan Football Federation
- Operator: Sonarges
- Capacity: 21,000

Construction
- Built: 2024–2025
- Opened: 25 May 2025; 17 months ago
- Cost: 528,000,000 DH

Tenants
- US Yacoub El Mansour (2025–present); WS Temara (2026–present); AS FAR (sometimes)

The Rabat Olympic Stadium (Arabic: الملعب الأولمبي بالرباط) is a multi-purpose stadium within the Prince Moulay Abdellah Stadium, located seven kilometers from the center of Rabat. With a total capacity of 21,000 seats, the stadium was built in nine months.

The stadium was inaugurated on 25 May 2025, to coincide with the return of the Meeting International Mohammed VI d'Athlétisme de Rabat, the fourth stage of the 2025 Diamond League, one year after its exceptional relocation to Marrakech. It hosted three group stage matches of the 2025 Africa Cup of Nations. This stadium was built to replace the athletics track that was removed from the Moulay Abdellah Sports Complex.

== Construction ==
This stadium was built in a record time of nine months (approximately 36 weeks). The allocated budget was nearly 496 million dirhams, plus an additional 32.1 million dirhams for laying the turf and installing the stands. This project required intensive organization, with work proceeding day and night to ensure the stadium was ready before the inauguration of the Meeting International Mohammed VI d'Athlétisme de Rabat, the fourth stage of the 2025 Diamond League.

== Facilities ==
The Rabat Olympic Stadium was designed to replace the athletics track at the Moulay Abdellah Stadium, which was removed to expand and modernize the stadium for the 2025 Africa Cup of Nations and the 2030 FIFA World Cup.

It features a 400m track that meets World Athletics standards, with a natural grass surface, a modern lighting system, and stands partially covered by a crescent-shaped membrane roof. The structure is spread over four levels:

- Basement: a 14,266m² parking garage, an anti-doping center, cryotherapy and weight training rooms, changing rooms, and a TV studio
- Ground floor: VIP/VVIP lounges, refreshment areas
- 1st floor: a conference room and a meeting room
- 2nd floor: lounge areas, audiovisual control rooms, and a TV studio

== International football matches ==
=== 2024 Women's Africa Cup of Nations ===
Date	Local time	Team No. 1	Result	Team No. 2	Round
5 July 2025	21:00	Morocco	2–2	Zambia	Group A
9 July 2025	20:00	DR Congo	2–4	Morocco	Group A
12 July 2025	20:00	Morocco	1–0	Senegal	Group A
18 July 2025	21:00	Morocco	3–1	Mali	Quarter-finals
22 July 2025	21:00	Morocco	1–1 (4–2 p)	Ghana	Semi-finals
26 July 2025	21:00	Morocco	2–3	Nigeria	Final

=== 2025 Africa Cup of Nations ===
Matches played in the Rabat Olympic Stadium for the 2025 African Cup of Nations:

Date	Local time	Team No. 1	Result	Team No. 2	Round
23 December 2025	15:30	Tunisia	3–1	Uganda	Group C
27 December 2025	20:30	Benin	1–0	Botswana	Group D
30 December 2025	18:00	Tanzania	1–1	Tunisia	Group C

== See also ==
- List of African stadiums by capacity
- List of football stadiums in Morocco
- List of association football stadiums by capacity
- Prince Moulay Abdellah Stadium
- Moulay Abdellah Sports Complex (Demolished)
