= 2024–25 Coupe de France Féminine =

Tournament details
- Country: France
- Dates: 23 November 2024 – 3 May 2025
- Teams: Federal Phase: 79; Final Phase: 32

Final positions
- Champions: Paris FC (2nd title)
- Runners-up: Paris Saint-Germain

Tournament statistics
- Matches played: 31
- Goals scored: 109 (3.52 per match)
- Attendance: 31,765 (1,025 per match)
- Top goal scorer(s): Inès Konan (Fleury); Romée Leuchter (PSG); Korbin Albert (PSG); Gaëtane Thiney (Paris FC) (4 goals each)
- All statistics correct as of 3 May 2025. All statistics include matches from the final phase only

The 2024–25 Coupe de France Féminine was the 24th season of the annual Coupe de France féminine, a knockout cup competition for women's football teams in France, The competition is organised by the French Football Federation (FFF).

Paris Saint-Germain (PSG) were the defending champions having defeated Fleury 1–0 in the final of the previous season.

Paris FC won their second title after defeating defending champions PSG 5–4 on penalties after a 0–0 draw after extra time in the final, held at Stade de l'Épopée in Calais.

== Schedule ==
The dates for the regional qualifying rounds and any necessary preliminaries were determined by the respective regional leagues. From the regional finals onward, the FFF established the calendar with all rounds scheduled for weekends.

Round	Dates	Teams
Regional Phase
Regional rounds	20 October 2024	
Regional finals	3 November 2024	136
Federal Phase
1st federal round	24 November 2024	79
2nd federal round	15 December 2024	40
Final Phase
Round of 32	12 January 2025	32
Round of 16	26 January 2025	16
Quarter-finals	9 February 2025	8
Semi-finals	9 March 2025	4
Final	3 May 2025	2

== Teams ==
The first four rounds, along with any preliminaries required, were organised by the Regional Leagues and the Overseas Departments/Territories, who allowed teams from within their league structure to enter. Teams from Division 3 Féminine entered at the third round. The 68 winners then joined the 11 Seconde Ligue teams in the Federal Phase. After the two federal rounds, the 20 winners then joined the 12 teams from the Première Ligue in the Final Phase.

Première Ligue (12)	Seconde Ligue (11)
AS Saint-Étienne; Dijon FCO; En Avant Guingamp; FC Fleury 91; FC Nantes; Havre AC; Montpellier Hérault SC; Olympique Lyonnais; Paris FC; Paris Saint-Germain; RC Strasbourg Alsace; Stade de Reims	FC Metz; Le Mans FC; LOSC Lille; OGC Nice; Olympique de Marseille; RC Lens; Rodez Aveyron Football; Thonon Évian GG FC; Toulouse FC; US Orléans Loiret; US Saint-Malo

Teams Qualified from the Regional Phase
Auvergne-Rhône-Alpes (9)	Bourgogne-Franche-Comté (4)	Brittany (6)	Centre-Val de Loire (3)	Corsica (1)
Division 3 Teams; Chassieu Décines FC; Clermont Foot 63; Grenoble Foot 38; Le Puy Foot 43 Auvergne; Regional Teams; Andrézieux-Bouthéon; EV.S. Genas Azieu; FC d'Annecy; Olympique de Valence; Sorbiers Talaudiere	Division 3 Teams; AJ Auxerre; ALC Longvic; Regional Teams; AS Châtenoy le Royal; GSF Haut Doubs	Division 3 Teams; CPB Bréquigny Rennes; Regional Teams; FC Lorient; Kériolets Pluvigner; Plérin FC; Quimper Kerfeunteun; Stade Rennais FC	Division 3 Teams; Bourges FC; Regional Team; LBC Châteauroux; Tours FC	Regional Team; FEC Bastiais
Grand Est (7)	Hauts-de-France (6)	Île-de-France (7)	Normandy (4)	Nouvelle-Aquitaine (6)
Regional Teams; AS Musau Strasbourg; AS Nancy Lorraine; CS Blénod; FC Vendenheim; JS Vaudoise; Molsheim Ernolsheim; SR Colmar FA	Division 3 Teams; RC Roubaix Wervicq F.; Regional Team; Amiens SC; US Beuvry; US Boulogne Cô.; USL Dunkerque; Valenciennes FC	Division 3 Teams; AAS Sarcelles; Saint-Denis RC; Regional Team; AC Boulogne-Billancourt; ES Seizième; Rueil Malmaison FC; Trappes ES; VGA Saint-Maur	Division 3 Teams; Quevilly RM; Regional Team; Évreux FC 27; FCF Rouen PE; Maladrerie OS	Regional Team; ASJ Soyaux-Charente; Aviron Bayonnais FC; ES 3 Cités Poitiers; FC Gradignan; Girondins de Bordeaux; Limoges Football
(Occitania (administrative region)) Occitania (6)	Pays de la Loire (5)	(Provence-Alpes-Côte d'Azur) Méditerranée (3)	Antilles-Guyane (1)	
Division 3 Teams; Albi Marssac TF; FF Nîmes Métrople Gard; Montauban FC TG; US Colomiers; Regional Team; Canet Roussillon FC; FC Sussargues	Division 3 Teams; Croix Blanche Angers F.; ESOF Vendée La Roche S/Yon; Regional Team; AEPR Rezé; Orvault SF; St Georges Guyonnière	Division 3 Teams; AS Cannes; AS Monaco FF; Regional Team; Rousset Sainte-Victoire	Martinique; Club Franciscain	

== Federal Phase ==
The draw for the two rounds of the federal phase took place at the French Football Federation headquarters in Paris On 6 November 2024.

=== First federal round ===
The first federal round matches took place on November 23–24 and December 1.

Group A

23 November 2024	RC Roubaix Wervicq (3)	10–1	(4) (Martinique) Club Franciscain	Roubaix
14:00	Bezzouh 5', 9', 22'; Bongben Buh 14', 75', 82'; Planquart 52'; Martinowski 70'; Marega 85'; Guembar 90+3' (pen.)	Report	Clavos 45+3' (pen.)	Stadium: Stade Antoine Maillard; Referee: Marine Verrier

24 November 2024	AJ Auxerre (3)	7–2	(4) US Boulogne	Auxerre
11:30	Sogoré 13'; Sadikou 27', 38', 44' (pen.), 74'; Tirilly 64', 90' (pen.)	Report	Fortin 5'; Lecomte 31'	Stadium: Stade Abbé Deschamps A1; Referee: Marie Lou Cristobal

24 November 2024	Valenciennes FC (4)	0–11	(2) LOSC Lille	Valenciennes
14:30		Report	Hlushchenko 2', 68', 74'; Conesa 8', 66'; Haugou 36'; Bamenga 47', 67', 73'; Ruffelaere 89'; Policnik 90'	Stadium: Stade Christophe Laurent 1 Referee: Cyndelle Aggoune

24 November 2024	FCF Rouen PE (4)	0–4	(2) RC Lens	Le Mesnil-Esnard
14:30		Report	David 17'; El Ghazouani 19'; Pinot 45+1'; Mereau 52'	Stadium: Stade Stanislas Bilyk; Referee: Sylvia Philion

24 November 2024	AC Boulogne-Billancourt (6)	0–1	(4) USL Dunkerque	Boulogne-Billancourt
14:30		Report	Swaertvaeger 18'	Stadium: Stade Le Gallo; Referee: Anaelle Rehel

24 November 2024	US Beuvry (4)	0–7	(2) US Orléans	Beuvry
14:30		Report	Traoré 42', 69', 90+2'; Mogendre 45', 89'; Popot 49'; Rubègue 83' (pen.)	Stadium: Stade Léo Lagrange 1 Referee: Mathilde Demoncay

1 December 2024	Quevilly-Rouen Métrop. (3)	1–1 (4–2 p)	(3) AAS Sarcelles	Petit-Quevilly
14:30	Erius 49'	Report	Ly 15'	Stadium: Stade Michel Mutel; Referee: Jade Mongiat
	Penalties
	Mallard (penalty scored); Pigache (penalty scored); Leroty (penalty scored); Gosseye (penalty missed); Desplanques (penalty scored)		(penalty scored) Benel; (penalty missed) Kara; (penalty scored) Kockenpoo; (penalty missed) Zemma

1 December 2024	Trappes ES (6)	1–2	(4) Amiens SC	Trappes
14:30	Lecerf 24'	Report	Anceschi 45'; Sicard 77'	Stadium: Stade Gilbert Chansac 2 Referee: Laurenne Gueroult

Group B

23 November 2024	Le Puy Foot 43 Auv. (3)	5–0	(4) CS Blénod	Le Puy-en-Velay
18:00	Coquard 16', 55'; Ben Rabah 40', 58', 89'	Report		Stadium: Stade Charles Massot 1 Referee: Oceane Ordonez Gomez

24 November 2024	Molsheim Ernolsheim (4)	0–4	(2) FC Metz	Molsheim
14:30		Report	Mbengue 58'; Feddaoui 80'; Djebli 81'; Petitjean 90+3'	Stadium: Parc Des Sports Stadium N°2; Referee: Joana Das Neves

24 November 2024	VGA Saint-Maur (4)	9–0	(5) JS Vaudoise	Saint-Maur-des-Fossés
14:00	Maalouf 6', 42'; Kouamé 12'; Meité 33'; Bénard 36'; Bekkouche 63'; Pierel 66', 82', 90'	Report		Stadium: Stade Adolphe Chéron; Referee: Ludivine Mortaigne

24 November 2024	AS Nancy Lorraine (4)	1–0	(4) FC Vendenheim	Nancy
14:30	Outomuro 88'	Report		Stadium: Stade Marcel Picot N° 2 Referee: Oceana Nommay

24 November 2024	Chassieu Décines FC (3)	1–3	(3) ALC Longvic	Chassieu
14:30	Oms 26'	Report	Richelandet 32'; Villemain 46', 53'	Stadium: Stade Romain Tisserand 1 Referee: Marion Salemme

24 November 2024	AS Musau Strasbourg (4)	Bye	Strasbourg
14:30		Report	Stadium: Stade De La Musau 2

1 December 2024	GSF Haut Doubs (4)	0–2	(3) Clermont Foot 63	Gilley
14:30		Report	Lapierre 8'; Trouiller 37'	Stadium: Stade Michel Vautrot 2 Referee: Lamia Laredj

1 December 2024	SR Colmar (5)	0–4	(2) Thonon Evian GG FC	Colmar
15:00		Report	Ndiaye 3'; Furet 20'; Stephen 38'; Woedikou 68'	Stadium: Parc Des Sports Stadium N°1; Referee: Lauren Perret

Group C

23 November 2024	Grenoble Foot 38 (3)	1–2	(2) Olympique Marseille	Grenoble
14:30	Ben Hadj Mahmoud 22'	Report	Paprzycki 29'; Scannapieco 37'	Stadium: Stade Stijovic N°1; Referee: Pauline Mazier

24 November 2024	Nîmes Métropole Gard (3)	2–0	(4) ES Genas Azieu	Nîmes
14:30	Kabore 41'; De Azevedo 77'	Report		Stadium: Stade Jean Bouin; Referee: Ombeline Lecoeuche

24 November 2024	FC Sussargues (5)	0–7	(3) AS Cannes	Sussargues
14:30		Report	Gaucher 9'; Magnier 18', 80'; Marcon 34' (o.g.); Morse 55'; Maetz 77'; Shaiek 85' (pen.)	Stadium: Stade Jules Rimet 1 Referee: Amandine Bouchard

24 November 2024	FEC Bastiais (4)	1–1 (3–2 p)	(3) AS Monaco FF	Bastia
14:30	Tonazzi 20'	Report	Brugeron 32'	Stadium: Stade Erbajolo; Referee: Lucie Lempereur
	Penalties
	Agbodjian Nilsson (penalty scored); Tonazzi (penalty scored); Brighi (penalty scored); Sellem (penalty missed); Brétigny (penalty missed)		(penalty scored) Bouziani; (penalty missed) Brugeron; (penalty missed) Sweye Ebunge; (penalty scored) Fray; (penalty missed) Courel

24 November 2024	AS Châtenoy le Royal (4)	2–0	(4) Sorbiers Talaudiere	Châtenoy-le-Royal
14:30	Bourgeois 79'; Garnier 90+3'	Report		Stadium: Stade Du Treffort N°1; Referee: Fatjona Borova

24 November 2024	Andrézieux-Bouthéon (6)	1–3	(4) Canet Roussillon FC	Andrézieux-Bouthéon
14:30	Dubourgnoux 73'	Report	Leroy 9'; Bensalah 55'; Billes 90+3'	Stadium: Complexe Sportif Gouyonnière 3 Referee: Marie Regnier

24 November 2024	Rousset Sainte-Victoire (4)	0–1	(2) Nice	Rousset
14:30		Report	Mzé Issa 41'	Stadium: Stade Plaine Sportive 1 Referee: Lisa Coste

24 November 2024	Olympique de Valence (4)	1–1 (7–8 p)	(4) FC Annecy	Valence
14:30	Mejean 28'	Report	Khadich 48'	Stadium: Stade Passelegue 1 Referee: Monia Dehmani
	Penalties
	Tarantino (penalty scored); Despesses (penalty scored); Thomas (penalty scored); Combes (penalty missed); Mejean (penalty scored); Rousset (penalty missed); Deygas (penalty scored); Gental (penalty scored); Mamoyan (penalty scored); Lévêque (penalty missed)		(penalty scored) Haroudj; (penalty scored) Carletesi; (penalty scored) Ravoire; (penalty missed) Rubio; (penalty scored) Ducrey; (penalty missed) Lahiouel; (penalty scored) Gruffat Cochet; (penalty scored) Moreau; (penalty scored) Khadich; (penalty scored) Monlep

Group D

23 November 2024	Montauban FCTG (3)	1–1 (3–4 p)	(4) ASJ Soyaux-Charente	Montauban
18:00	Ouillon 81'	Report	Couturier 38' (pen.)	Stadium: Complexe Sportif Jean Verbeke 1 Referee: Lauren Perret
	Penalties
	Ouillon (penalty missed); Espéout (penalty scored); Le Moing (penalty scored); Gachet (penalty scored); De Jesus (penalty missed)		(penalty scored) Couturier; (penalty scored) Puntous; (penalty scored) Dubois; (penalty scored) Richard; (penalty missed) Audouin

23 November 2024	ES 3 Cités Poitiers (4)	1–2	(2) Toulouse FC	Poitiers
19:00	Beaulieu 43'	Report	Pardon 3'; Roumiga-Cayrol 38'	Stadium: Complexe Sportif Saint Nicolas; Referee: Jade Mongiat

24 November 2024	Girondins Bordeaux (4)	2–3	(3) ESOF Vendée La Roche	Arsac
14:30	Elicèche 40' (o.g.); Guellil 90+2'	Report	Thulliez 6'; Lelo 45+3'; Pierre-Jean 65'	Stadium: Stade De La Bergerie N°1; Referee: Marie Gilloux

24 November 2024	LB Châteauroux (4)	0–2	(4) Orvault SF	Châteauroux
14:30		Report	Garnaud 21'; Lebreton 81'	Stadium: Stade Claude Jamet 2 Referee: Angele Poublanc

24 November 2024	St. Georges Guyonnière (4)	1–2	(4) Limoges Football	St-Georges-de-Montaigu
14:30	Dufaure 85' (o.g.)	Report	Copeman 38'; Caloin 90+1'	Stadium: Complexe Sportif Du Grand Logis 1 Referee: Miya Praud Nkoulou

24 November 2024	Aviron Bayonnais FC (5)	0–0 (4–5 p)	(2) Rodez AF	Bayonne
14:30		Report		Stadium: Stade Didier Deschamps 2 Referee: Morgane Chignard
	Penalties
	Varas (penalty scored); Tiret (penalty scored); Martins (penalty scored); Bazangette (penalty scored); Galera (penalty missed)		(penalty scored) Sévenne; (penalty scored) Tamba; (penalty scored) Devant; (penalty scored) Soleilhet; (penalty scored) Dayes

24 November 2024	FC Gradignan (4)	1–4	(3) Albi Marssac TF	Gradignan
14:30	Ben Kacem Lidri 35' (pen.)	Report	Da Cunha 3', 12'; Laoudihi 56'; Cid 70'	Stadium: Stade Saint Géry; Referee: Thais Guiose

24 November 2024	Rezé AEPR (5)	0–4	(3) US Colomiers	Rezé
14:00		Report	Bima 5', 88', 90+4'; Daviaud 23'	Stadium: Stade Léo Lagrange 1 Referee: Delphine Breton

Group E

24 November 2024	Le Mans FC (2)	1–0	(2) US Saint-Malo	Le Mans
14:30	Guermazi 54'	Report		Stadium: Parc Des Sports La Californie 1 Referee: Agathe Kocher

24 November 2024	RC Saint-Denis (3)	2–0	(4) Évreux FC 27	Saint-Denis
14:30	Benlazar 11'; Battouri 44'	Report		Stadium: Stade Auguste Delaune 1 Referee: Marine Tanguy

24 November 2024	Kériolets Pluvigner (5)	1–2	(4) ES Seizième	Pluvigner
14:30	Kervadec 90'	Report	Sousa 26' (pen.); Plaut 42'	Stadium: Stade Du Goh Lanno 2 Referee: Lou Guillet

24 November 2024	Maladrerie OS (5)	1–3	(3) Croix Blanche Angers	Caen
14:30	Vicente 84'	Report	Lamarque 10'; Delescluse 34'; Halgand 54'	Stadium: Stade Joseph Déterville 1 Referee: Marina De Almeida

24 November 2024	Rueil-Malmaison FC (4)	1–1 (2–4 p)	(4) Plérin FC	Rueil-Malmaison
14:15	Dicko 69'	Report	Navicet 85' (pen.)	Stadium: Stade Du Parc N° 2 Referee: Bess Guesdon
	Penalties
	Barraquier Janbon (penalty missed); Debonne (penalty scored); Lyaoui (penalty missed); Aït El Kadi (penalty scored)		(penalty scored) Navicet; (penalty scored) Marchadour; (penalty scored) Le Gall; (penalty scored) Hauroigne

24 November 2024	CPB Bréquigny Rennes (3)	0–0 (5–6 p)	(4) FC Lorient	Rennes
14:30		Report		Stadium: Complexe Sportif De Bréquigny 4 Referee: Aurelie Efe
	Penalties
	Lepaisant (penalty missed); Miriel (penalty scored); Josse (penalty missed); Beaulieu (penalty scored); Gras (penalty scored); Thomelier (penalty scored); Da Silva Marques (penalty scored); Forest (penalty missed)		(penalty scored) Lehoux; (penalty missed) Le Du; (penalty missed) Grayo; (penalty scored) Giuly; (penalty scored) Salaün; (penalty scored) Audo; (penalty scored) Jeannes; (penalty scored) Mauguin

24 November 2024	Stade Rennais FC (5)	1–2	(3) Bourges FC	Rennes
14:30	Delys 36'	Report	Theriez 51'; Ndiaye 64'	Stadium: Stade Ecluse Moulin Du Comte 2 Referee: Cloe Mariette

24 November 2024	Tours FC (4)	1–0	(4) Quimper Kerfeunteun	Tours
14:30	Latour 67'	Report		Stadium: Stade De La Vallée Du Cher 11; Referee: Maria El Khoury

=== Second federal round ===
The second federal round matches were held on December 14–15, 2024.

Group A

15 December 2024	Quevilly-Rouen Métrop. (3)	3–1	(4) Amiens SC	Petit-Quevilly
14:30	Ba 10', 36'; Demesse 88'	Report	Sicard 43'	Stadium: Stade Mahmoud Tiarci; Referee: Marine Tanguy

15 December 2024	AJ Auxerre (3)	1–1 (3–5 p)	(2) LOSC Lille	Auxerre
14:30	Sogoré 37'	Report	Haugou 88'	Stadium: Stade Abbé Deschamps A3; Referee: Siham Benmahammed
	Penalties
	Tirilly (penalty scored); Faure (penalty missed); Sogoré (penalty scored); Cruman (penalty scored)		(penalty scored) Pian; (penalty scored) Haugou; (penalty scored) Bamenga; (penalty scored) Hlushchenko; (penalty scored) Devleesschauwer

15 December 2024	RC Lens (2)	1–2	(3) RC Roubaix Wervicq	Lens
14:30	Bertrand 57'	Report	Dembele 29'; Tchaptchet 90'	Stadium: Stade Albert Debeyre 1 Referee: Manon Persichetti

15 December 2024	USL Dunkerque (4)	2–9	(2) US Orléans	Dunkerque
14:00	Swaertvaeger 3'; Lecaille 5'	Report	Mogendre 18'; Traoré 21', 88', 90', 90+2'; Vranić 31', 47', 76'; Cousin 62'	Stadium: Stade Marcel Tribut N° 2 Referee: Lucie Lempereur

Group B

15 December 2024	FC Metz (2)	4–0	(3) Le Puy Foot 43 Auv.	Longeville-lès-Metz
13:00	Boutaleb 43'; Feddaoui 45+1'; Bethi 74'; Mbengue 78' (pen.)	Report		Stadium: Stade Dezavelle; Referee: Mathilde Demoncay

15 December 2024	AS Musau Strasbourg (4)	3–3 (3–4 p)	(4) VGA Saint-Maur	Strasbourg
13:00	Thill 44'; Magy 78'; Richard 90+3'	Report	Meite 24'; Bekkouche 37'; Bénard 62'	Stadium: Stade De La Musau 2 Referee: Karen Robin
	Penalties
	Wioland (penalty scored); Girardin (penalty missed); Bitterlin (penalty scored); Conrad (penalty missed); Magy (penalty scored)		(penalty scored) Bekkouche; (penalty scored) Chanfi; (penalty scored) Fofana; (penalty missed) Meite; (penalty scored) Bénard

15 December 2024	Clermont Foot 63 (3)	7–0	(4) AS Nancy Lorraine	Clermont-Ferrand
14:30	Chaudier 38'; Bordier 53', 58'; Lapierre 60'; Micard 71'; Meireles 73'; Bayeul 80' (o.g.)	Report		Stadium: Stade Gabriel Montpied 2 Referee: Cyndelle Aggoune

15 December 2024	ALC Longvic (3)	0–0 (4–5 p)	(2) Thonon Evian GG FC	Longvic
14:30	Villemain (penalty scored); Gaudoin (penalty scored); Commaret (penalty missed); Kouame (penalty scored); Hormat (penalty scored); Richelandet (penalty missed)	Report	(penalty scored) Nicot; (penalty scored) Trevisan; (penalty scored) Palma; (penalty scored) Taleb Muller; (penalty missed) Ndiaye; (penalty scored) Zemzem	Stadium: Stade Maurice Colson 1 Referee: Marina De Almeida

Group C

15 December 2024	Nîmes Métropole Gard (3)	0–10	(2) Olympique Marseille	Nîmes
14:30		Report	Léger 31', 46', 48', 55'; Couasnon 33'; Scannapieco 61', 72', 90'; Mazza 76'; Khezami 89'	Stadium: Stade Jean Bouin; Referee: Amandine Bouchard

15 December 2024	AS Cannes (3)	5–1	(4) FEC Bastiais	Cannes
14:30	Morse 5', 12', 35'; Bendris 30'; Peju 90+2'	Report	Mehadji 67'	Stadium: Stade Maurice Chevalier 2 Referee: Lisa Costa

15 December 2024	AS Chatenoy-le-Royal (4)	3–1	(4) Canet Roussillon FC	Chatenoy-le-Royal
14:30	Lordon 7' (pen.); Troncin 11'; Bellier 35'	Report	El Kartite 43'	Stadium: Stade Du Treffort N°1; Referee: Marie Prignon

15 December 2024	FC Annecy (4)	0–6	(2) OGC Nice	Poisy
14:30		Report	Robert 24', 84'; Soulac 47'; Bouby 66', 90+3'; Barrier 69'	Stadium: Stade Abbe Charles Poncet 2 Referee: Mila Teixeira

Group D

14 December 2024	Rodez AF (2)	2–0	(3) Albi Marssac TF	Rodez
14:30	Barnoin 15'; Tamba 90'	Report		Stadium: Stade Paul Lignon; Referee: Marie Gilloux

15 December 2024	ASJ Soyaux-Charente (4)	0–2	(3) ESOF Vendée La Roche	Soyaux
14:30		Report	Pierre-Jean 49'; Hamoniaux 73'	Stadium: Stade Léo Lagrange 1 Referee: Marie Lou Cristobal

15 December 2024	Orvault SF (4)	7–2	(4) Limoges Football	Orvault
14:30	Guillin 9'; Karadjov 20', 44', 60', 90+3'; Boisset 58'; Servant 78'	Report	Copeman 5', 22'	Stadium: Stade De Gagné N° 2 Referee: Anais Guillaume

15 December 2024	Toulouse FC (2)	1–0	(3) US Colomiers	Toulouse
14:30	Bironien 72'	Report		Stadium: Parc Des Sports Stadium A1; Referee: Marion Salemme

Group E

15 December 2024	Le Mans FC (2)	4–1	(3) RC Saint-Denis	Le Mans
14:30	Guermazi 9'; Salomon 15', 47'; Chabourine 90+5'	Report	Battouri 69'	Stadium: Parc Des Sports La Californie 1 Referee: Sylvia Philion

15 December 2024	Seizième ES (4)	0–1	(3) Croix Blanche Angers	Paris
14:30		Report	Mareau 50'	Stadium: Stade De L' Hippodrome Auteuil; Referee: Pauline Mazier

15 December 2024	Plérin FC (4)	0–2	(4) FC Lorient	Plérin
14:30		Report	Gilles 53'; Grayo 70'	Stadium: Stade Marcel Gouedard 1 Referee: Oceane Ordonez Gomez

15 December 2024	Bourges FC (3)	2–2 (4–2 p)	(4) Tours FC	Bourges
14:30	Ndiaye 21'; Sama 58'	Report	Kasiama 25'; Poux 88'	Stadium: Stade Jacques Rimbault 1 Referee: Lauren Perret
	Penalties
	Manie (penalty scored); Bailly (penalty scored); Ndiaye (penalty scored); Theriez (penalty scored)		(penalty missed) Guidi; (penalty scored) Letissier; (penalty scored) Vallée; (penalty missed) Latour

== Final Phase ==
=== Round of 32 ===
Group A

12 January 2025	Croix Blanche Angers (3)	0–3	(1) Paris Saint-Germain	Angers
14:30		Report	Dudek 36'; Albert 90+2'; Leuchter 90+3'	Stadium: André Bertin Stadium 1 Attendance: 2,280; Referee: Maika Vanderstichel

12 January 2025	Quevilly-Rouen Métropole (3)	0–1	(1) Havre AC	Le Petit-Quevilly
14:30		Report	Elisor 54'	Stadium: Stade Michel Mutel; Attendance: 433; Referee: Agathe Kocher

15 January 2025	LOSC Lille (2)	4–1	(1) EA Guingamp	Villeneuve-d'Ascq
14:30	Conesa 3', 89'; Hlushchenko 56'; Pian 80'	Report	Ribeyra 90+4'	Stadium: Stadium Terrain N°1; Attendance: 337; Referee: Victoria Beyer

12 January 2025	FC Metz (2)	0–3	(1) FC Nantes	Longeville-lès-Metz
13:15		Report	Rabanne 40', 47'; Cosme 78'	Stadium: Stade Dezavelle; Attendance: 103; Referee: Audrey Gerbel

15 January 2025	RC Roubaix Wervicq (3)	0–5	(1) Paris FC	Roubaix
14:30		Report	Thiney 10' (pen.); Bussy 30'; Davis 34'; Bourdieu 82'; Liaigre 86'	Stadium: Stade Antoine Maillard; Attendance: 370; Referee: Morgane Chignard

12 January 2025	Orvault SF (4)	0–12	(1) Fleury	Orvault
14:30		Report	Fernandes 4'; Robert 10' (pen.); Kopińska 31'; Kamczyk 33'; Konan 41', 59', 89'; Tounkara 48'; Fontaine 65'; Traoré 75', 87'; Louis 82'	Stadium: Stade de Gagné N° 1 Attendance: 339; Referee: Marine Tanguy

12 January 2025	US Orléans (2)	0–2	(2) Le Mans	Orléans
14:30		Report	Nado 16'; Guermazi 36'	Stadium: Stade de la Source 2 Attendance: 160; Referee: Siham Benmahammed

12 January 2025	ESOF Vendée La Roche (3)	2–1	(4) FC Lorient	La Roche-sur-Yon
14:30	Lelo 7' (pen.); Moreau 53'	Report	Gilles 43'	Stadium: Stade de Saint-André-d'Ornay 1 Attendance: 456; Referee: Manon Persichetti

Group B

12 January 2025	Clermont Foot 63 (3)	0–6	(1) Dijon FCO	Clermont-Ferrand
16:00		Report	Taylor 2'; Picard 6', 10', 72' (pen.); Jedlińska 32'; Wu Chengshu 45'	Stadium: Stade Gabriel-Montpied 2 Attendance: 625; Referee: Cecile Bessiere

12 January 2025	AS Saint-Étienne (1)	2–1	(2) Olympique Marseille	Saint-Étienne
14:30	Champagnac 59'; Pierre-Louis 75'	Report	Khezami 43'	Stadium: Stade Salif-Keita; Attendance: 490; Referee: Elisa Daupeux

12 January 2025	Stade de Reims (1)	0–0 (10–9 p)	(1) Lyon	Bétheny
17:00		Report		Stadium: Stade Louis Blériot 2 Attendance: 291; Referee: Romy Fournier
	Penalties
	Calba (penalty scored); Corboz (penalty scored); Kack (penalty missed); Le Moguédec (penalty scored); Boucly (penalty scored); White (penalty scored); Maoulida (penalty scored); Gyau (penalty scored); Adamek (penalty scored); Haelewyn (penalty scored); Massey (penalty scored)		(penalty scored) Horan; (penalty missed) Hegerberg; (penalty scored) Diani; (penalty scored) Egurrola; (penalty scored) Le Sommer; (penalty scored) Huerta; (penalty scored) Carpenter; (penalty scored) Gilles; (penalty scored) Sombath; (penalty scored) Chawinga; (penalty missed) Benkarth

12 January 2025	Bourges FC (3)	0–4	(1) Montpellier HSC	Bourges
14:30		Report	Khelifi 1'; Léger 45+1' (o.g.); Onumonu 61'; Ngueleu 90+1'	Stadium: Stade Jacques Rimbault 1 Attendance: 550; Referee: Savina El Bour

12 January 2025	Thonon Evian GG FC (2)	3–0	(2) Rodez AF	Thonon-les-Bains
14:00	Esposito 45'; Stephen 70'; Zemzem 90+7'	Report		Stadium: Stade St. Disdille 3 Attendance: 79; Referee: Mathilde Demoncay

12 January 2025	AS Chatenoy-le-Royal (4)	1–1 (3–4 p)	(3) AS Cannes	Châtenoy-le-Royal
14:00	Lordon 47'	Report	Froment 23' (pen.)	Stadium: Stade du Treffort N°1; Attendance: 200; Referee: Joana Das Neves
	Penalties
	Lordon (penalty scored); Troncin (penalty missed); Pinto (penalty scored); Bellier (penalty scored); Val (penalty missed)		(penalty missed) Maetz; (penalty scored) Busquet; (penalty scored) Cirri; (penalty scored) Rochetaing; (penalty scored) Froment

12 January 2025	VGA Saint-Maur (4)	0–4	(1) Strasbourg	Saint-Maur-des-Fossés
14:30		Report	Khoury 3', 70'; Enge 52'; Chapelle 90'	Stadium: Stade Adolphe-Chéron; Attendance: 220; Referee: Aurelie Efe

12 January 2025	Toulouse FC (2)	3–0	(2) Nice	Toulouse
11:00	Laurier 5' (o.g.); Lapassouse 7'; Solanet 73' (pen.)	Report		Stadium: Parc des Sports Stadium A1; Attendance: 192; Referee: Emeline Rochebiliere

=== Round of 16 ===
24 January 2025	FC Nantes (1)	1–6	(1) Paris Saint-Germain	Nantes
20:00	Marcano 30'	Report	Traoré 9'; Echegini 15'; Elimbi Gilbert 48'; Albert 51'; Leuchter 61', 89'	Stadium: Stade Marcel Saupin; Attendance: 1,547; Referee: Émeline Rochebilière

25 January 2025	Montpellier HSC (1)	0–2	(1) Havre AC	Montpellier
14:30		Report	Gavory 63'; Roth 87'	Stadium: Stade Bernard Gasset - Mama Ouattara; Attendance: 167; Referee: Alexandra Collin

25 January 2025	RC Strasbourg (1)	1–1 (6–7 p)	(2) LOSC Lille	Strasbourg
14:30	Hannequin 38' (pen.)	Report	Conesa 45+1'	Stadium: Stade Jean-Nicolas Muller; Attendance: 261; Referee: Romy Fournier
	Penalties
	Joseph (penalty missed); Chapelle (penalty scored); Hannequin (penalty scored); Tchakounté (penalty scored); Khoury (penalty scored); Béché (penalty scored); Hoarau (penalty scored); Loving (penalty missed)		(penalty scored) Pian; (penalty scored) Haugou; (penalty missed) Bensalem; (penalty scored) Dulder; (penalty scored) Devleesschauwer; (penalty scored) Conesa; (penalty scored) Mbala; (penalty scored) Delcroix

25 January 2025	Stade de Reims (1)	0–2	(1) AS Saint-Étienne	Bétheny
14:30		Report	Bataillard 45+4'; Caputo 51'	Stadium: Stade Blériot 1 Attendance: 500; Referee: Audrey Gerbel

26 January 2025	Toulouse FC (2)	3–3 (4–2 p)	(1) Fleury	Toulouse
11:00	Bironien 7'; Ali Abdallah 58'; Solanet 72'	Report	Fernandes 14'; Kamczyk 18'; Konan 34'	Stadium: Parc des Sports Stadium A1; Attendance: 260; Referee: Savina El Bour
	Penalties
	Atamaniuk (penalty scored); Jumere Seignou (penalty scored); Marty (penalty scored); Yacob (penalty scored)		(penalty scored) Robert; (penalty missed) Kopińska; (penalty missed) Kamczyk; (penalty scored) Diaz

26 January 2025	ESOF Vendée La Roche (3)	0–6	(1) Paris FC	La Roche-sur-Yon
14:00		Report	Garbino 8'; Davis 16'; Corboz 18'; Hamoniaux 38' (o.g.); Thiney 40' (pen.); Le Mouël 70'	Stadium: Stade de Saint-André-d'Ornay; Attendance: 546; Referee: Agathe Kocher

26 January 2025	AS Cannes (3)	0–5	(2) Le Mans FC	Cannes
14:00		Report	Guermazi 44', 66'; Bouzid 55' (pen.); Oger 60'; Henry 79' (pen.)	Stadium: Stade Maurice Chevalier 1 Attendance: 147; Referee: Siham Benmahammed

26 January 2025	Thonon Evian GG FC (2)	0–2	(1) Dijon FCO	Thonon-les-Bains
14:30		Report	Terchoun 29', 39'	Stadium: Stade Joseph-Moynat 1 Attendance: 452; Referee: Elisa Daupeux

=== Quarter-finals ===
7 February 2025	Le Mans FC (2)	0–4	(1) Paris Saint-Germain	Le Mans
20:00		Report	Echegini 2'; Albert 14'; Geyoro 54'; Leuchter 76'	Stadium: Stade Marie-Marvingt; Attendance: 4,005; Referee: Maika Vanderstichel

9 February 2025	LOSC Lille (2)	0–3	(1) AS Saint-Étienne	Villeneuve-d'Ascq
14:30		Report	Pierre-Louis 47'; Caputo 79'; Cambot 84'	Stadium: Stadium Terrain No. 1 Attendance: 311; Referee: Victoria Beyer

9 February 2025	Paris FC (1)	2–0	(1) Dijon FCO	Paris
14:30	Thiney 8' (pen.); Matéo 31'	Report		Stadium: Stade Sébastien Charléty; Attendance: 669; Referee: Elisa Daupeux

9 February 2025	Havre AC (1)	2–1	(2) Toulouse FC	Le Havre
14:30	Cardia 49'; Enguehard 90'	Report	Solanet 81'	Stadium: Stade Océane; Attendance: 1,744; Referee: Audrey Gerbel

=== Semi-finals ===
7 March 2025	Havre AC (1)	1–2	(1) Paris FC	Le Havre
18:30	Roth 84'	Report	Bussy 13'; Thiney 33'	Stadium: Stade Océane; Attendance: 4,522; Referee: Émeline Rochebilière

8 March 2025	AS Saint-Étienne (1)	1–2	(1) Paris Saint-Germain	Saint-Étienne
14:30	Stratigakis 72'	Report	Albert 67'; Geyoro 90+9'	Stadium: Stade Salif-Keita; Attendance: 1,491; Referee: Alexandra Collin

=== Final ===
3 May 2025
14:00

Paris FC (1)	0–0	(1) Paris Saint-Germain
	Report
Penalties
Greboval (penalty scored); Matéo (penalty missed); Korošec (penalty scored); Bussy (penalty scored); Le Mouël (penalty scored); Sissoko (penalty scored)	5–4	(penalty scored) Leuchter; (penalty scored) Katoto; (penalty scored) Karchaoui; (penalty missed) Albert; (penalty scored) Mbock Bathy; (penalty missed) Le Guilly

Stade de l'Épopée, Calais
Attendance: 8,108
Referee: Audrey Gerbel

== See also ==
- 2024–25 Première Ligue
