= 2025–26 Coupe LFFP =

Tournament details
- Country: France
- Dates: 13 September 2025 – 14 March 2026
- Teams: 24

Final positions
- Champions: OL Lyonnes (1st title)
- Runners-up: Paris Saint-Germain

Tournament statistics
- Matches played: 41
- Goals scored: 139 (3.39 per match)
- Attendance: 14,911 (364 per match)
- Top goal scorer(s): Mathilde Bourdieu (Marseille); Cindy Caputo (Fleury); 4 goals each

The 2025–26 Coupe de la Ligue féminine de football professionnel was the inaugural edition of the Coupe LFFP, the annual Première and Seconde Ligue's league cup competition.

== Format ==
On 14 June 2025, the LFFP Executive Committee approved the format of the competition, which consists of two phases: a group stage (French: phase éliminatoire) and a knockout stage (French: phase finale). The top three Première Ligue clubs participating in European competitions during the season receive a bye directly to the final phase.

Group stage

The remaining 21 clubs (9 from Première Ligue and 12 from Seconde Ligue) are drawn into five groups of four or five teams, balanced by division and geographical proximity. Each team plays the others once. Matches between divisions are normally hosted by the Seconde Ligue club, while ties between teams from the same division have home advantage decided by draw. The five group winners advance to the knockout stage.

Knockout stage

The quarter-finals are contested by the five group winners and the three European participants. Home advantage is awarded to the three clubs participating in European competitions and the best group winner, determined by average points per match. The quarter-final draw also sets the semi-finals and final. All knockout ties are single matches, with the final potentially staged at a neutral venue, including outside France.

== Group stage ==
=== Group A ===
Pos	Team	Pld	W	PW	PL	L	GF	GA	GD	Pts	Qualification
1	Dijon FCO	4	4	0	0	0	15	2	+13	12	Advanced to Knockout stage
2	FC Metz	4	3	0	0	1	11	5	+6	9	
3	RC Strasbourg Alsace	4	2	0	0	2	4	9	−5	6	
4	AJ Auxerre	4	1	0	0	3	9	9	0	3	
5	Stade de Reims	4	0	0	0	4	1	15	−14	0	

Source: FFF.fr
13 September 2025
14:00

Reims	0–2	Strasbourg
	Report	Pinto 45'; Tchakounté 50'

Stade Louis Blériot 1, Bétheny
Attendance: 87
Referee: Aurélie Efe
13 September 2025
14:00

Metz	4–1	Auxerre
Ribeyra 10', 12'; Fodil 40'; Joseph 48'	Report	Faure 22' (pen.)

Stade du Batzenthal 1, Algrange
Attendance: 146
Referee: Cécile Bessière

11 October 2025
14:00

Auxerre	1–3	Dijon
Ngaseh Mbele 87'	Report	Wu 21', 58'; Domin 83'

Stade Abbé-Deschamps A3, Auxerre
Attendance: 361
Referee: Anaïs Guillaume
11 October 2025
14:00

Reims	1–3	Metz
Smits 56'	Report	Mbengue 31', 36'; Joseph 48'

Stade Louis Blériot 2, Bétheny
Attendance: 100
Referee: Margaux Dru

15 November 2025
15:00

Auxerre	1–2	Strasbourg
Mabomba 21'	Report	Yeboah 11'; Agnew 17'

Stade Abbé-Deschamps A3, Auxerre
Attendance: 263
Referee: Marion Salemme
15 November 2025
15:00

Metz	1–3	Dijon
Ribeyra 43'	Report	Kopińska 7'; Nottelet 25' (o.g.); Terchoun 70'

Stade Dezavelle, Longeville-lès-Metz
Attendance: 152
Referee: Gabrielle Guillot

10 December 2025
17:00

Strasbourg	0–5	Dijon
	Report	Terchoun 9', 38'; Krezyman 40'; Wu 46'; Wang 90'

Parc des Sports Stadium N°1, Colmar
Attendance: 340
Referee: Audrey Gerbel
10 December 2025
17:00

Auxerre	6–0	Reims
Cruman 24'; Stefut 30', 60', 71'; Boutaleb 54', 65'	Report

Stade Abbé-Deschamps A3, Auxerre
Attendance: 173
Referee: Joana Das Neves

21 January 2026
16:00

Metz	3–0	Strasbourg
Mbengue 4'; Joseph 9'; Feddaoui 55'	Report

Centre d'entraînement du FC Metz 1, Marly
Attendance: 66
Referee: Siham Benmahammed
21 January 2026
15:00

Dijon	4–0	Reims
Simon 9', 24', 28'; Defour 83'	Report

Stade Gaston Gérard, Dijon
Attendance: 150
Referee: Manon Persichetti

=== Group B ===
Pos	Team	Pld	W	PW	PL	L	GF	GA	GD	Pts	Qualification
1	Thonon Évian GG FC	3	2	1	0	0	4	2	+2	8	Advanced to Knockout stage
2	OGC Nice	3	1	0	1	1	5	2	+3	4	
3	AS Saint-Étienne	3	1	0	0	2	6	8	−2	3	
4	Grenoble Foot 38	3	1	0	0	2	3	6	−3	3	

Source: FFF.fr
13 September 2025
14:00

Nice	4–0	Saint-Étienne
Palin 12'; Soulac 70', 82'; Barrier 90+5'	Report

Stade Charles-Ehrmann N° 01, Nice
Attendance: 96
Referee: Agathe Kocher
13 September 2025
14:00

Grenoble	0–1	Thonon Évian
	Report	Phiri 75'

Stade du Vercors 1, Grenoble
Attendance: 114
Referee: Marion Salemme

11 October 2025
14:00

Thonon Évian	3–2	Saint-Étienne
Belmiliani 30', 50'; Ladhani 41'	Report	Hermann 23' (pen.); Connesson 49'

Stade Joseph-Moynat 1, Thonon-les-Bains
Attendance: 50
Referee: Gabrielle Guillot
11 October 2025
18:00

Nice	1–2	Grenoble
Niakaté 87'	Report	Fabre 10'; Sadiki 43'

Stade de la Plaine du Var N°1, Nice
Attendance: 73
Referee: Siham Benmahammed

15 November 2025
15:00

Grenoble	1–4	Saint-Étienne
Domenjoud 86'	Report	Istocki 4', 56'; Pierre-Louis 39'; Connesson 45+2'

Stade du Vercors 1, Grenoble
Attendance: 239
Referee: Aurélie Efe
16 November 2025
13:00

Thonon Évian	0–0	Nice
	Report
Penalties
	5–4

Stade Joseph-Moynat 1, Thonon-les-Bains
Attendance: 50
Referee: Morgane Chignard

=== Group C ===
Pos	Team	Pld	W	PW	PL	L	GF	GA	GD	Pts	Qualification
1	Marseille	3	2	1	0	0	7	4	+3	8	Advanced to Knockout stage
2	Montpellier HSC	3	2	0	1	0	7	3	+4	7	
3	Toulouse FC	3	1	0	0	2	2	6	−4	3	
4	Rodez AF	3	0	0	0	3	2	5	−3	0	

Source: FFF.fr
13 September 2025
14:00

Montpellier	2–2	Marseille
Rambaud 71'; Koko 86'	Report	Bourdieu 8', 54'
Penalties
	3–4

Stade Jacques Robert, Le Crès
Attendance: 171
Referee: Romy Fournier
13 September 2025
14:00

Rodez	0–1	Toulouse
	Report	Solanet 63' (pen.)

Stade de Vabre N° 2, Onet-le-Château
Attendance: 252
Referee: Mathilde Demoncay

11 October 2025
14:00

Toulouse	0–3	Montpellier
	Report	Kadzere 64'; Levasseur 74'; Chabod 87'

Parc des Sports Stadium A1, Toulouse
Attendance: 214
Referee: Charlène Laur
11 October 2025
14:00

Rodez	1–2	Marseille
Brissonnet 60'	Report	Bourdieu 49'; Carro 52'

Stade Paul-Lignon, Rodez
Attendance: 503
Referee: Lisa Coste

15 November 2025
15:00

Rodez	1–2	Montpellier
Yetna 15'	Report	Kadzere 21', 41'

Stade Paul-Lignon, Rodez
Attendance: 252
Referee: Cécile Bessière
15 November 2025
15:00

Toulouse	1–3	Marseille
Solanet 45+1'	Report	Perret 31'; Brown 44'; Bourdieu 69'

Parc des Sports Stadium A1, Toulouse
Attendance: 350
Referee: Romy Fournier

=== Group D ===
Pos	Team	Pld	W	PW	PL	L	GF	GA	GD	Pts	Qualification
1	RC Lens	3	3	0	0	0	5	1	+4	9	Advanced to Knockout stage
2	FC Fleury 91	3	2	0	0	1	10	4	+6	6	
3	Le Mans FC	3	1	0	0	2	5	8	−3	3	
4	LOSC Lille	3	0	0	0	3	2	9	−7	0	

Source: FFF.fr
13 September 2025
13:00

Lille	1–2	Le Mans
Hlushchenko 45'	Report	Guermazi 68'; Chapelle 74' (pen.)

Stadium Terrain N°1, Villeneuve-d'Ascq
Attendance: 214
Referee: Joana Das Neves
13 September 2025
14:00

Fleury	0–1	Lens
	Report	Martins 79' (o.g.)

Stade départemental Robert-Bobin 1, Bondoufle
Attendance: 234
Referee: Elisa Daupeux

11 October 2025
14:00

Lille	1–5	Fleury
Conesa 63'	Report	Laurent 10', 74'; Caputo 32', 50'; Cance 66'

Complexe Sportif De Luchin Eden Hazard, Camphin-en-Pévèle
Attendance: 235
Referee: Mathilde Demoncay
11 October 2025
14:30

Le Mans	1–2	Lens
Hoarau 62'	Report	Proniez 27'; Archier 90'

Stade Marie-Marvingt, Le Mans
Attendance: 4,500
Referee: Joana Das Neves

14 November 2025
19:00

Lille	0–2	Lens
	Report	El Koumir 6', 74'

Stadium Terrain Honneur, Villeneuve-d'Ascq
Attendance: 2,774
Referee: Siham Benmahammed
15 November 2025
15:00

Le Mans	2–5	Fleury
Chapelle 2'; Hoarau 74'	Report	Caputo 24', 54'; Bizet 50'; Jaurena 62'; Étienne 67'

Parc des Sports La Californie 1, Le Mans
Attendance: 157
Referee: Anaïs Guillaume

=== Group E ===
Pos	Team	Pld	W	PW	PL	L	GF	GA	GD	Pts	Qualification
1	FC Nantes	3	2	1	0	0	9	3	+6	8	Advanced to Knockout stage
2	Le Havre AC	3	2	0	0	1	6	2	+4	6	
3	US Saint-Malo	3	1	0	1	1	6	5	+1	4	
4	EA Guingamp	3	0	0	0	3	1	12	−11	0	

Source: FFF.fr
13 September 2025
14:00

Le Havre	0–1	Nantes
	Report	Khelifi 55'

Stade Océane, Le Havre
Attendance: 447
Referee: Morgane Chignard
13 September 2025
14:00

Guingamp	0–3	Saint-Malo
	Report	Babinga 17', 69'; Eninger 18'

Complexe Sportif Akademi EAG 1, Pabu
Attendance: 170
Referee: Manon Persichetti

11 October 2025
14:00

Saint-Malo	2–2	Nantes
Eninger 61'; Boisneau 66'	Report	Calba 48'; Swierot 81'
Penalties
	3–5

Stade de Marville 1, Saint-Malo
Attendance: 280
Referee: Marie Gilloux
11 October 2025
14:00

Guingamp	0–3	Le Havre
	Report	Folquet 34'; Roth 47'; Enguehard 90+3'

Complexe Sportif Akademi EAG 1, Pabu
Attendance: 175
Referee: Marion Salemme

14 November 2025
15:00

Saint-Malo	1–3	Le Havre
Pian 60'	Report	Adjabi 2'; Stiévenart 25'; Gallais 73'

Stade de Marville 1, Saint-Malo
Attendance: 195
Referee: Joana Das Neves
15 November 2025
15:00

Guingamp	1–6	Nantes
Domond 28' (pen.)	Report	Calba 15'; Toloba 49', 78'; Fleury 50'; Mossard 73'; Swierot 81'

Complexe Sportif Akademi EAG 1, Pabu
Attendance: 208
Referee: Marie Gilloux

== Knockout stage ==
External videos
- 2025–26 Coupe LFFP; Knockout stage – Draw
- Draw Live Stream

The draw for the knockout stage was held on 9 January 2026 at the headquarters of the French Football Federation in Paris. It was presented by Romain Balland and conducted by Aline Riera.

OL Lyonnes, Paris Saint-Germain and Paris FC entered the League Cup at the quarter-final stage, having been exempt from the group stage due to their participation in the 2025–26 UEFA Women's Champions League.

Seeding

Seeded	Unseeded
OL Lyonnes; Paris Saint-Germain; Paris FC; Dijon FCO or RC Lens	Dijon FCO or RC Lens; FC Nantes; Les Marseillaises; Thonon Évian GG FC

The 3 European representatives and the best-ranked qualified team from the group stage were seeded. As the postponed fifth and final matchday of Group A took place after the draw, the identity of the final seeded team was not yet known. Dijon, who were the best-ranked team before their final match, and RC Lens, the only team that could overtake them if Dijon lost, were therefore drawn as 'Dijon or Lens' in both pots. On 21 January 2026, the pairings were confirmed after Dijon’s victory over Reims, which secured them the seeded position.

=== Bracket ===
Quarter-finals
4 February
Dijon FCO	2
FC Nantes	1
4 February
OL Lyonnes	4
Marseille	0
4 February
Paris Saint-Germain FC	3
Thonon Évian GG FC	0
4 February
Paris FC	1
RC Lens	0

Semi-finals
14 February
Dijon FCO	0
OL Lyonnes	4
14 February
Paris Saint-Germain FC	3
Paris FC	0

Final
14 March – Abidjan
OL Lyonnes	1
Paris Saint-Germain FC	0

=== Quarter-finals ===
4 February 2026
17:00

Dijon	2–1	Nantes
Siren 57'; Carage 82'	Report	Éloissaint 36'

Stade Gaston Gérard, Dijon
Attendance: 86
Referee: Cécile Bessière

4 February 2026
15:00

OL Lyonnes	4–0	Marseille
Bècho 4'; Benyahia 27'; Hegerberg 30'; Katoto 80'	Report

Stade Gérard Houllier, Décines-Charpieu
Attendance: 996
Referee: Audrey Gerbel

4 February 2026
20:00

Paris Saint-Germain	3–0	Thonon Évian GG
Isabela 36'; Lafontaine 63', 85'	Report

Training Center Paris Saint-Germain N°5, Poissy
Attendance: 2,295
Referee: Charlène Laur

4 February 2026
14:30

Paris FC	1–0	Lens
Ould Hocine 90+3'	Report

Stade Sébastien Charléty, Paris
Attendance: 379
Referee: Romy Fournier

=== Semi-finals ===
14 February 2026
19:00

Dijon	0–4	OL Lyonnes
	Report	Hegerberg 17', 32'; Bacha 65'; Katoto 88'

Stade Gaston Gérard, Dijon
Attendance: 690
Referee: Maika Vanderstichel

14 February 2026
17:00

Paris Saint-Germain	3–0	Paris FC
Leuchter 47'; Kanjinga 58'; Ajibade 89'	Report

Training Center Paris Saint-Germain N°5, Poissy
Attendance: 430
Referee: Alexandra Collin

=== Final ===
14 March 2026
18:30

OL Lyonnes	1–0	Paris Saint-Germain
Dumornay 59'	Report

Felix Houphouet Boigny Stadium, Abidjan, Ivory Coast
Attendance: 27,900
Referee: Émeline Rochebilière

== Goalscorers ==
There were 139 goals scored in 41 matches, for an average of 3.39 goals per match.

4 goals

- (France) Mathilde Bourdieu – Marseille
- (France) Cindy Caputo – Fleury

3 goals

- (Australia) Kyah Simon – Dijon
- (China) Wu Chengshu – Dijon
- (France) Amélie Joseph – Metz
- (France) Anaïs Ribeyra – Metz
- (France) Loredana Stefut – Auxerre
- (Malawi) Rose Kadzere – Montpellier
- (Norway) Ada Hegerberg – Lyon
- (Senegal) Seynabou Mbengue – Metz
- (Switzerland) Meriame Terchoun – Dijon

2 goals

- (Algeria) Inès Boutaleb – Auxerre
- (Belgium) Mariam Toloba – Nantes
- (Canada) Nikolina Istocki – Saint-Étienne
- (Democratic Republic of the Congo) Anastasia Soulac – Nice
- (France) Pamela Babinga – Saint-Malo
- (France) Inès Belmiliani – Thonon Evian
- (France) Lucie Calba – Nantes
- (France) Adèle Connesson – Saint-Étienne
- (France) Thelma Eninger – Saint-Malo
- (France) Fanny Hoarau – Le Mans
- (France) Marie-Antoinette Katoto – Lyon
- (France) Marie-Estella Lafontaine – Paris Saint-Germain
- (France) Émelyne Laurent – Fleury
- (France) Tatiana Solanet – Toulouse
- (France) Julie Swierot – Nantes
- (Morocco) Kenza Chapelle – Le Mans
- (Morocco) Kaïna El Koumir – Lens

1 goal

- (Algeria) Ikram Adjabi – Le Havre
- (Algeria) Lana Smits – Reims
- (Brazil) Isabela Chagas – Paris Saint-Germain
- (Cameroon) Bernadette Ngaseh – Auxerre
- (Canada) Maya Ladhani – Thonon Evian
- (Canada) Marie Levasseur – Montpellier
- (China) Wang Yanwen – Dijon
- (Democratic Republic of the Congo) Merveille Kanjinga – Paris Saint-Germain
- (Democratic Republic of the Congo) Gloria Mabomba – Auxerre
- (Denmark) Laura Hermann – Saint-Étienne
- (Finland) Emmi Siren – Dijon
- (France) Louann Archier – Lens
- (France) Selma Bacha – Lyon
- (France) Inés Barrier – Nice
- (France) Vicki Bècho – Lyon
- (France) Inès Benyahia – Lyon
- (France) Aude Bizet – Fleury
- (France) Charlotte Boisneau – Saint-Malo
- (France) Tiphaine Brissonnet – Rodez
- (France) Célia Chabod – Montpellier
- (France) Laurie Cance – Fleury
- (France) Noémie Carage – Dijon
- (France) Anna Conesa – Lille
- (France) Colleen Cruman – Auxerre
- (France) Lou Defour – Dijon
- (France) Elsa Domenjoud – Grenoble
- (France) Romane Enguehard – Le Havre
- (France) Claudia Fabre – Grenoble
- (France) Emma Faure – Auxerre
- (France) Louise Fleury – Nantes
- (France) Magnaba Folquet – Le Havre
- (France) Thaïs Gallais – Le Havre
- (France) Inès Jaurena – Fleury
- (France) Léa Khelifi – Nantes
- (France) Ilona Koko – Montpellier
- (France) Juliette Mossard – Nantes
- (France) Célina Ould Hocine – Paris FC
- (France) Joséphine Palin – Nice
- (France) Jenny Perret – Marseille
- (France) Julie Pian – Saint-Malo
- (France) Fany Proniez – Lens
- (France) Élisa Rambaud – Montpellier
- (France) Madeline Roth – Le Havre
- (France) Zoé Stiévenart – Le Havre
- (France) Anaëlle Tchakounté – Strasbourg
- (France) Ananée Yeboah – Strasbourg
- (France) Madeleine Yetna – Rodez
- (Haiti) Chelsea Domond – Guingamp
- (Haiti) Melchie Dumornay – Lyon
- (Haiti) Roseline Éloissaint – Nantes
- (Haiti) Lourdjina Étienne – Fleury
- (Haiti) Amandine Pierre-Louis – Saint-Étienne
- (Jamaica) Jody Brown – Marseille
- (Mali) Yakaré Niakaté – Nice
- (Morocco) Maria Fodil – Metz
- (Morocco) Nehla Sadiki – Grenoble
- (Netherlands) Romée Leuchter – Paris Saint-Germain
- (Nigeria) Rasheedat Ajibade – Paris Saint-Germain
- (Poland) Oliwia Domin – Dijon
- (Poland) Dominika Kopińska – Dijon
- (Poland) Nadia Krezyman – Dijon
- (Portugal) Fátima Pinto – Strasbourg
- (Spain) Marta Carro – Marseille
- (Tunisia) Leina Feddaoui – Metz
- (Tunisia) Sana Guermazi – Le Mans
- (Ukraine) Inna Hlushchenko – Lille
- (United States) Murphy Agnew – Strasbourg
- (United States) Samiah Phiri – Thonon Evian

1 own goal

- (France) Gillian Nottelet – Metz
- (Portugal) Morgane Martins – Fleury

== See also ==
- 2025–26 Première Ligue
- 2025–26 Seconde Ligue
