= 2025–26 Coupe de France Féminine =

Tournament details
- Country: France
- Dates: 22 November 2025 – 10 May 2026
- Teams: Federal Phase: 80; Final Phase: 32

Final positions
- Champions: OL Lyonnes (11th title)
- Runners-up: Paris Saint-Germain

Tournament statistics
- Matches played: 31
- Goals scored: 118 (3.81 per match)
- Attendance: 35,710 (1,152 per match)
- Top goal scorer(s): Marie-Antoinette Katoto (Lyon) (7 goals)
- All statistics include matches from the final phase only

The 2025–26 Coupe de France Féminine was the 25th season of the annual Coupe de France Féminine, a knockout cup competition for women's football teams in France, organised by the French Football Federation (FFF).

Paris FC were the defending champions having defeated rivals PSG 5–4 on penalties after a scoreless draw in the final of the previous season. However, they were unable to retain the title after being eliminated by PSG in the semi-finals. Meanwhile, OL Lyonnes returned to the final for the first time since 2023 and went on to secure a record-extending 11th title with a victory over PSG in the final.

== Schedule ==
Schedule
Phase	Round	Date	Teams
Federal Phase	1st round	22–23 November 2025	80
Federal Phase	2nd round	13–14 December 2025	40
Final Phase	Round of 32	10–11 January 2026	32
Final Phase	Round of 16	24–25 January 2026	16
Final Phase	Quarter-finals	13–14 March 2026 (Note: If a club were qualified for the quarter-finals and for the final of the 2025–26 Coupe LFFP, then its quarter-final match would be moved to Wednesday 18 March 2026.)	8
Final Phase	Semi-finals	4–5 April 2026	4
Final Phase	Final	9–10 May 2026	2

== Teams ==
The first four rounds of the regional phase, including any necessary preliminaries, were organised by the Regional Leagues and the Overseas Departments/Territories, allowing teams from within their league structures to take part. Division 3 Féminine sides entered the competition at the third round.

The 68 winners from the regional phase then joined the 12 Seconde Ligue teams in the Federal Phase. After the two federal rounds, the 20 winners will advance to the Final Phase, where they will be joined by the 12 Première Ligue teams.

Première Ligue (12)	Seconde Ligue (12)
AS Saint-Étienne; Dijon FCO; FC Fleury 91; FC Nantes; Havre AC; Les Marseillaises; Montpellier Hérault SC; OL Lyonnes; Paris FC; Paris Saint-Germain; RC Lens; RC Strasbourg Alsace	AJ Auxerre; En Avant Guingamp; FC Metz; Grenoble Foot 38; Le Mans FC; LOSC Lille; OGC Nice; Rodez Aveyron Football; Stade de Reims; Thonon Évian GG FC; Toulouse FC; US Saint-Malo

Teams Qualified from the Regional Phase
Auvergne-Rhône-Alpes (9)	Bourgogne-Franche-Comté (5)	Brittany (6)	Centre-Val de Loire (3)	Corsica (1)
AS Saint-Martin-en-Haut; Aurillac FC; Clermont Foot 63; ES Cernex; FBBP 01; GUC Football Féminin; Le Puy Football 43 Auvergne; Riorges FC; US Annecy-Le-Vieux	ALC Longvic; AS Châtenoy-le-Royal; FC Montceau Bourgogne; FC Sochaux-Montbéliard; Is-Selongey Football	AS Dirinon; Auray FC; FC Lorient; Stade Brestois 29; Stade Rennais FC; US La Gacilly	Bourges FC; C'Chartres Football; US Orléans Loiret	FEC Bastiais
Grand Est (7)	Hauts-de-France (6)	Île-de-France (7)	Normandy (4)	Nouvelle-Aquitaine (6)
CSO Amnéville; ES Molsheim Ernolsheim; ESTAC Troyes; SA Épinal; SMC Marnaval; SR Colmar FA; SR Saint-Dié Kellermann	FC Lillers; OM Cambrai Amérique; RC Roubaix-Wervicq; Saint Amand FC; Valenciennes FC; Villeneuve d'Ascq FF	AAS Sarcelles; AC Boulogne-Billancourt; Cosmo Taverny; EFP Fontainebleau; FC Versailles 78; Paris SO Coeur; Red Star FC	AS Ifs; FCF Rouen Plateau Est; Quevilly RM; SM Caen	Bergerac Périgord FC; ES Trois Cités Poitiers; FC Girondins de Bordeaux; Genêts d'Anglet Foot; Pau FC; Trélissac-Antonne Périgord FC
(Occitania (administrative region)) Occitania (5)	Pays de la Loire (6)	(Provence-Alpes-Côte d'Azur) Méditerranée (3)	Antilles-Guyane (1)	Océan Indien (1)
Albi Marssac TF; ASPTT Montpellier; Avenir Foot Lozère; Montauban FC TG; Nîmes Foot Féminin	ESOF Vendée La Roche-sur-Yon; GF Havre et Loire; GF Loroux-Divatte; Orvault SF; RC Flèchois; Saint-Georges Guyonnière FC	AS Monaco FF; FCF Monteux; Saint-Didier Espérance Pernoise	Guadeloupe AS Dynamo Le Moule	Réunion Saint-Pauloise FC

== Federal Phase ==
The draw for the two rounds of the federal phase took place at the French Football Federation headquarters in Paris on 5 November 2025.

=== First federal round ===
The first federal round was held from 22 to 23 November 2025, with Seconde Ligue teams entering the competition at that stage.

Group A

22 November 2025 N°1	Villeneuve d'Ascq FF (4)	5–1	(4) (Réunion) Saint-Pauloise FC	Villeneuve d'Ascq
13:00	Pamart 27'; Dauchy 39'; Tsoungui 42'; Kaci 45+2'; Pavy 52'	Report	Gardebien 62'	Stadium: Stade Jean-Jacques 1 Referee: Fanny Mazen

22 November 2025 N°2	AAS Sarcelles (3)	9–0	(4) (Guadeloupe) Dynamo Le Moule	Sarcelles
15:30	Do 9'; Kadri 12', 67'; Chasseloup de Laubat 17'; Dias 37'; Tutin 52', 61'; Sawa 89'; Sadikou 90+1'	Report		Stadium: Complexe Sportif Nelson Mandela 3 Referee: Bess Guesdon

23 November 2025 N°3	EFP Fontainebleau (4)	2–1	(4) OM Cambrai Amérique	Fontainebleau
14:30	Trevit 37', 49'	Report	Mendoza 90+1'	Stadium: Stade Philippe Mahut 1 Referee: Mila Teixeira

23 November 2025 N°4	Valenciennes FC (4)	2–3	(2) LOSC Lille	Valenciennes
14:30	Van de Put 48'; Duée-Taquet 50'	Report	Haugou 12'; Rucker 34' (pen.); Conesa 90+3'	Stadium: Stade Christophe Laurent 1 Referee: Mathilde Demoncay

23 November 2025 N°5	RC Roubaix-Wervicq (3)	6–1	(4) FC Lillers	Roubaix
14:30	Sissoko 51'; Rougemont 53'; Martinowski 55'; Bongben Buh 76'; Devleesschauwer 81'; Zubieta 89'	Report	Odekerken 30'	Stadium: Avenue du Parc des Sports; Referee: Pauline Tournelle

23 November 2025 N°6	Quevilly RM (3)	2–0	(2) Stade de Reims	Le Petit-Quevilly
14:30	Gosseye 36', 45+4'	Report		Stadium: Stade Michel Mutel; Referee: Sylvia Philion

23 November 2025 N°7	Saint-Amand FC (5)	0–1	(5) SMC Marnaval Saint-Dizier	Saint-Amand-les-Eaux
14:30		Report	Jarillot 17'	Stadium: Complexe Sportif N-D. d'Amour 2 Referee: Anaïs Lebas

23 November 2025 N°8	AC Boulogne-Billancourt (6)	0–11	(2) Le Mans FC	Boulogne-Billancourt
14:30		Report	Faity 1', 45+3'; Hoarau 9', 14', 63'; Chapelle 36'; Roger 48'; Bekhti 50', 55'; Ibrahim 75'; Lemarchand 84'	Stadium: Stade Le Gallo; Referee: Karen Robin

Group B

23 November 2025 N°9	Is-Selongey Football (4)	9–1	(4) SR Colmar FA	Is-sur-Tille
14:30	Perrin 22', 48' (pen.); Audroin 39', 41'; Petiot 55'; Gremy-Garcia 57'; Riotot 71'; Bailly 79'; Jacques 83'	Report	Philipp 56'	Stadium: Stade du Réveil 1 Referee: Leïla Agic

23 November 2025 N°10	FC Montceau Bourgogne (4)	0–6	(3) ES Molsheim Ernolsheim	Montceau-les-Mines
14:30		Report	Maetz 27'; Touseau 32'; Bissey 69'; Grosjean 70', 76'; Eck 85'	Stadium: Stade des Alouettes 1 Referee: Mathilde Delorme

23 November 2025 N°11	Riorges FC (5)	2–2 (7–6 p)	(3) ALC Longvic	Riorges
14:30	Ducreux 6'; Tuffet 83'	Report	Bani 55'; Locoge 73'	Stadium: Parc des Sports de Galliéni 2 Referee: Amélie Leglise
	Penalties
	Membre (penalty missed); De Sa (penalty scored); Tuffet (penalty scored); Ducreux (penalty missed); Durval (penalty scored); Issaoui (penalty missed); Leroux (penalty scored); Poyet (penalty scored); Pardon (penalty scored); Dessert (penalty scored)		(penalty missed) Monnot; (penalty scored) Locoge; (penalty scored) Daller; (penalty missed) De Brito; (penalty scored) Zidane; (penalty missed) Vandingenen; (penalty scored) Prunier; (penalty scored) Begoin; (penalty scored) Galuchot; (penalty missed) Bani

22 November 2025 N°12	AJ Auxerre (2)	1–1 (3–2 p)	(3) Bourges FC	Auxerre
18:00	Mabomba 54'	Report	Ndiaye 83'	Stadium: Stade Abbé-Deschamps A3; Referee: Cyndelle Aggoune
	Penalties
	Tirilly (penalty scored); Vinatier (penalty missed); Neller (penalty missed); Boutaleb (penalty scored); Faure (penalty scored)		(penalty scored) Mapangou; (penalty missed) Manie; (penalty scored) Ndiaye; (penalty missed) Theriez; (penalty missed) Hadj-Safi

23 November 2025 N°13	FC Metz (2)	1–2	(2) Thonon Evian GG FC	Longeville-lès-Metz
14:30	Ribeyra 37'	Report	Stephen 22', 72'	Stadium: Stade Dezavelle; Referee: Siham Benmahammed

22 November 2025 N°14	US Annecy-le-Vieux (4)	8–3	(5) FC Sochaux-Montbéliard	Annecy-le-Vieux
18:00	Messe 18', 58'; Glenat 27', 81', 85'; Rey 67', 86'; Delory 74'	Report	Rekibi 30' (pen.); Goulfaoui 50'; Picout 56'	Stadium: Complexe Sportif d'Albigny 2 Referee: Marie Régnier

23 November 2025 N°15	SA Épinal (5)	1–3	(4) ESTAC Troyes	Épinal
14:30	Girr 85'	Report	Chartoire 25' (o.g.); Ferard 79', 81'	Stadium: Stade de la Colombière N° 3 Referee: Amélia Fernandez

23 November 2025 N°16	CSO Amnéville (4)	8–0	(5) SR Saint-Dié Kellermann	Amnéville
14:30	Cattelain 18'; Ambos 20', 31', 86', 87'; Losson 22', 42'; Cammarata 37'	Report		Stadium: Stade André-Valentin; Referee: Chiara Moeglin

Group C

23 November 2025 N°17	FCF Monteux-Vaucluse (4)	0–3	(3) AS Châtenoy-le-Royal	Monteux
14:30		Report	Joly 22'; Pochat Cottilloux 51'; Gauliard 83'	Stadium: Plaine des Sports Raymond Chabran; Referee: Amandine Bouchard

23 November 2025 N°18	Nîmes Foot Féminin (4)	3–2	(3) Le Puy Foot 43 Auvergne	Nîmes
14:30	Kaboré 6'; Dessalles 48'; Dion 87'	Report	Graell 7'; Gaudoin 14'	Stadium: Stade Jean-Bouin; Referee: Maissa Ammar

23 November 2025 N°19	Clermont Foot 63 (3)	3–0	(3) AS Monaco FF	Clermont-Ferrand
14:30	Fachinan 2'; Lapierre 19'; Debonnaire 45'	Report		Stadium: Stade Gabriel-Montpied 2 Referee: Marie Gilloux

23 November 2025 N°20	FBBP 01 (4)	1–6	(2) OGC Nice	Péronnas
14:30	Maggiacomo 88'	Report	Abroguoa 4', 82'; Palin 9'; Laurier 19'; Tengue 36'; Marichaud 85'	Stadium: Stade Municipal 1 Referee: Margaux Dru

23 November 2025 N°21	Avenir Foot Lozère (5)	0–8	(2) Grenoble Foot 38	Mende
14:30		Report	Sadiki 10', 26', 60', 74'; Fabre 11', 16', 85'; Akpa 75'	Stadium: Stade Jean-Jacques Delmas; Referee: Gabrielle Guillot

23 November 2025 N°22	ASPTT Montpellier (4)	1–1 (3–2 p)	(4) AS Saint-Martin-en-Haut	Montpellier
14:30	Karotsch 40'	Report	Girondon 16' (pen.)	Stadium: Stade de Grammont 12; Referee: Elyne Obringer
	Penalties
	Bodain (penalty scored); Dedieu (penalty missed); Guilhemjouan (penalty scored); Bibang-Torres (penalty missed); Carcenac (penalty missed); Akhnak (penalty scored)		(penalty missed) Simon; (penalty scored) Braud; (penalty missed) Gougam; (penalty scored) Cafasso; (penalty missed) Rozier; (penalty missed) Girondon

23 November 2025 N°23	Aurillac FC (5)	0–2	(5) GUC Football Féminin	Aurillac
13:00		Report	Ramlot 22'; Vargoz 84'	Stadium: Stade de Baradel 4 Referee: Floresa Mustafa

23 November 2025 N°24	FEC Bastiais (4)	1–5	(4) St. Didier Espérance Pernoise	Bastia
14:30	Tatat 29' (pen.)	Report	Molina 32', 41', 65', 90+1'; Oddon 70'	Stadium: Stade Erbajolo; Referee: Joana Das Neves

Group D

23 November 2025 N°25	US La Gacilly (5)	0–9	(3) ESOF Vendée La Roche	La Gacilly
14:30		Report	Henry 22', 36'; Murail 24'; Biraud 42', 68'; Lépine 48'; Basset 70'; Lelo 79', 90+1'	Stadium: Stade de la Croix des Archers 1 Referee: Elina Plainchamp

23 November 2025 N°26	FCG Bordeaux (3)	2–1	(3) Montauban FC TG	Bordeaux
14:30	Dubuisson 85', 89'	Report	Genet 26'	Stadium: Stade Bel Air 1 Referee: Angèle Poublanc

23 November 2025 N°27	Saint Georges Guyonnière FC (4)	0–5	(3) Albi Marssac TF	Saint-Georges-de-Montaigu
14:30		Report	Cosme 20'; Cazeau 34' (pen.); Crouzet 58'; Kirbach 80'; Da Cunha 89'	Stadium: Complexe Sportif du Grand Logis 1 Referee: Manon Floret Bossoreille

23 November 2025 N°28	GF Havre et Loire (4)	5–1	(5) GF Loroux Divatte	Ancenis-Saint-Géréon
14:30	Guillemot 15', 75'; Ploquin 46', 50'; Popyn 69'	Report	Branchereau 39'	Stadium: Stade de la Davrays 1 Referee: Olivier Lerouyer

23 November 2025 N°29	Trélissac AP FC (5)	1–6	(2) Toulouse FC	Trélissac
14:30	Tankeu Monthe 6'	Report	Lambert 12'; Joseph 13'; Bardet 36'; Perea 51'; Lapassouse 72'; Champagnac 89'	Stadium: Stade Firmin-Daudou 1 Referee: Lamia Laredj

23 November 2025 N°30	RC Fléchois (5)	3–1	(2) Rodez AF	La Flèche
14:30	Durdan 44', 75', 90'	Report	Gay 17'	Stadium: Stade Bouchevereau; Referee: Lucie Lempereur

23 November 2025 N°31	ES Poitiers 3 Cités (4)	0–1	(4) Bergerac Périgord FC	Poitiers
14:30		Report	El Hocine 59'	Stadium: Complexe Sportif Saint-Nicolas; Referee: Anaïs Demené

23 November 2025 N°32	Genêts d'Anglet Football (4)	1–4	(4) Pau FC	Anglet
14:30	Tinot 31'	Report	Bodon 12' (o.g.); Rodrigues 49', 63'; Boubien 72'	Stadium: Stade Choisy; Referee: Priscillia Hoornaert

Group E

23 November 2025 N°33	FC Lorient (3)	2–1	(3) US Orléans-Loiret	Lorient
14:30	Brézac 31'; Lehoux 81'	Report	Noël 4'	Stadium: Stade de Kervenanec 1 Referee: Marina de Almeida

23 November 2025 N°34	Stade Brestois 29 (4)	4–1	(5) Auray FC	Brest
14:00	Cayre 17', 46' (pen.); Blacodon 40'; Talarmein 43'	Report	Vianais 21'	Stadium: Stade de la Cavale Blanche 1 Referee: Léa Blivet

23 November 2025 N°35	Red Star FC (5)	1–0	(6) Versailles 78 FC	Saint-Ouen-sur-Seine
14:30	Ramasawmy 16'	Report		Stadium: Stade Joliot-curie; Referee: Marie Prignon

23 November 2025 N°36	Stade Rennais FC (4)	4–4 (3–2 p)	(2) EA Guingamp	Rennes
14:30	Garcia 16'; Polet 21'; Le Goff Ringenbach 74', 90'	Report	Martin 12'; Donnary 30'; Péniguel 68'; Carville 90+4' (o.g.)	Stadium: Stade Eduardo Camavinga; Referee: Laura Bouchaud
	Penalties
	Le Goff Ringenbach (penalty missed); Tall (penalty scored); Garcia (penalty missed); Averty (penalty scored); Lepaisant (penalty scored)		(penalty scored) Péniguel; (penalty missed) Donnary; (penalty missed) Daoudi; (penalty scored) Domond; (penalty missed) Renard

23 November 2025 N°37	FCF Rouen PE (4)	2–0	(4) Cosmo Taverny	Le Mesnil-Esnard
14:30	Gasti 36'; Delestre 50'	Report		Stadium: Stade du SIVOM 1 Referee: Manon Lebeau

22 November 2025 N°38	AS Dirinon (5)	0–9	(2) US Saint-Malo	Dirinon
14:30		Report	Leveau 23'; Eninger 30', 34', 70'; Kleczewski 64', 89'; Minot 75'; Koné 84'; Maurice 87'	Stadium: Stade Olivier Kerdraon; Referee: Jade Mongiat

23 November 2025 N°39	AS Ifs (4)	1–3	(4) C'Chartres Football	Ifs
14:30	Dubos 28'	Report	Laguionie-Mendy 50', 81'; Nasri 75'	Stadium: Stade Pierre-Mendès-France 1 Referee: Lou Guillet

23 November 2025 N°40	SM Caen (3)	3–0	(4) Paris SO Cœur	Caen
14:30	Leroty 28'; Bugna 50'; Benaïssa 90+2'	Report		Stadium: Stade de Venoix - Claude-Mercier; Referee: Delphine Breton

=== Second federal round ===
Group A

14 December 2025	Villeneuve d'Ascq FF (4)	0–1	(3) AAS Sarcelles	Villeneuve d'Ascq
14:30		Report	Sadikou 20'	Stadium: Stade Jean-Jacques 1 Referee: Delphine Breton

14 December 2025	EFP Fontainebleau (4)	0–5	(2) LOSC Lille	Fontainebleau
14:30		Report	Lelarge 13'; Zang Bikoula 15'; Conesa 55'; Haugou 65'; Delcroix 90'	Stadium: Stade Philippe Mahut 2 Referee: Aurélie Efe

14 December 2025	RC Roubaix-Wervicq (3)	3–2	(3) Quevilly RM	Roubaix
14:30	Norden 28' (o.g.); Martinowski 76'; Zubieta 81'	Report	Gosseye 52', 72'	Stadium: Stade Antoine Maillard; Referee: Siham Benmahammed

14 December 2025	SMC Marnaval Saint-Dizier (5)	0–12	(2) Le Mans FC	Saint-Dizier
14:30		Report	Lemarchand 5', 22', 49', 66'; Bekhti 25'; Dechilly 32'; Ibrahim 35', 52', 53'; Oger 68', 89'; Gasnier 83'	Stadium: Stade des Aciéries 1 Referee: Lauren Perret

Group B

14 December 2025	Is-Selongey Football (4)	1–2	(3) ES Molsheim Ernolsheim	Is-sur-Tille
14:30	Motte 90+1'	Report	Schwartz 20'; Fortune 78' (o.g.)	Stadium: Stade du Réveil 1 Referee: Pauline Tournelle

14 December 2025	Riorges FC (5)	0–13	(2) AJ Auxerre	Riorges
14:30		Report	Mabomba 20', 25'; Cruman 35'; Faure 39', 77'; Stefut 41'; Serrano Mijan 52'; Lafay 56' (o.g.); Monguillon 69'; Ngaseh Mbele 73'; Boutaleb 81'; Tirilly 84'; Guyard 90'	Stadium: Parc des Sports de Galliéni 2 Referee: Bess Guesdon

14 December 2025	US Annecy-le-Vieux (4)	0–11	(2) Thonon Evian GG FC	Annecy-le-Vieux
14:30		Report	Ladhani 21', 35'; Valentino 31'; Phiri 36', 65'; Priol 47'; Bouzid 52'; Stephen 58'; Clérac 68', 74'; Belmiliani 89'	Stadium: Complexe Sportif d'Albigny 2 Referee: Gabrielle Guillot

14 December 2025	ESTAC Troyes (4)	0–0 (8–7 p)	(4) CSO Amnéville	Troyes
14:30		Report		Stadium: Stade de l'Aube 4 Referee: Marina De Almeida
	Penalties
	Litho Kamene (penalty missed); Boudaud Thumphong (penalty scored); Cheddakh (penalty scored); Rebours (penalty scored); Louette (penalty scored); Férard (penalty scored); Chelli (penalty scored); Harvenot-Blanco (penalty scored)		(penalty scored) Lorrain; (penalty scored) Barlogis; (penalty scored) Cattelain; (penalty scored) Clerc; (penalty missed) Ambos; (penalty scored) Benourhazi; (penalty scored) Hanriot; (penalty missed) Loche-Wrzesniewski

Group C

14 December 2025	AS Châtenoy-le-Royal (3)	4–2	(4) Nîmes Foot Féminin	Châtenoy-le-Royal
14:30	Pochat-Cottilloux 4', 22'; Roblet 20', 24'	Report	De Ranchin 27'; Doin 59'	Stadium: Stade du Treffort N°1; Referee: Karen Robin

14 December 2025	Clermont Foot 63 (3)	0–2	(2) OGC Nice	Clermont-Ferrand
14:30		Report	Abrogoua 44'; Barrier 61' (pen.)	Stadium: Stade Gabriel-Montpied 2 Referee: Cyndelle Aggoune

14 December 2025	ASPTT Montpellier (4)	1–2	(2) Grenoble Foot 38	Montpellier
14:30	Matell 33'	Report	Baga 76'; Dedieu 85' (o.g.)	Stadium: Stade de Grandmont 12; Referee: Marion Salemme

14 December 2025	GUC Football Féminin (5)	0–2	(4) St. Didier Espérance Pernoise	Gières
14:30		Report	Schaeffer 4'; Bonjean 65'	Stadium: Parc des Sports Paul Bourgeat 1 Referee: Carla Benedetto

Group D

14 December 2025	ESOF Vendée La Roche (3)	2–1	(3) FCG Bordeaux	La Roche-sur-Yon
14:30	Lepine 26'; Lelo 44'	Report	Roux 34'	Stadium: Stade de Saint-André-d'Ornay 1 Referee: Sylvia Philion

14 December 2025	Albi Marssac TF (3)	5–0	(4) GF Havre et Loire	Albi
14:30	Laoudihi 7'; Cazeau 14', 34'; Compper-Banguillot 55'; Da Cunha 90'	Report		Stadium: Stade Maurice Rigaud N°1; Referee: Mathilde Delorme

14 December 2025	RC Fléchois (5)	0–6	(2) Toulouse FC	La Flèche
14:30		Report	Speybrouck 17' (o.g.); Chaudet 29' (o.g.), 34' (o.g.); Bironien 50', 75'; Chailleux 86' (o.g.)	Stadium: Stade Bouchevereau; Referee: Marie Prignon

13 December 2025	Bergerac Périgord FC (4)	2–1	(4) Pau FC	Bergerac
19:00	Mahile 67', 87'	Report	Laine 2'	Stadium: Stade de Campréal; Referee: Elina Plainchamp

Group E

14 December 2025	FC Lorient (3)	2–1	(4) Stade Brestois 29	Lorient
14:30	Brigand 14', 18'	Report	Blacodon 60'	Stadium: Stade de Tréfaven 2 Referee: Anaïs Guillaume

14 December 2025	Red Star FC (5)	2–4	(4) Stade Rennais FC	Saint-Denis
17:00	Georges 72', 74'	Report	Le Goff Ringenbach 46'; Richou 66'; Le Courtois 89'; Lesne 90+2'	Stadium: Stade de Marville N°1; Referee: Amélie Léglise

13 December 2025	FCF Rouen PE (4)	0–9	(2) US Saint-Malo	Le Mesnil-Esnard
18:30		Report	Babinga 14'; Dumets 24'; Pian 42', 47', 52'; Umeugochukwu 80'; Koné 84'; Charpentier 85'; Leveau 87'	Stadium: Stade du SIVOM 1 Referee: Manon Persichetti

14 December 2025	C'Chartres Football (4)	1–3	(3) SM Caen	Chartres
14:30	Nasri 27'	Report	Fall 16', 56'; Periot 90+5'	Stadium: Stade James Delarue; Referee: Laura Bouchaud

== Final Phase ==
=== Round of 32 ===
Group A

10 January 2026	Bergerac Périgord FC (4)	0–9	(1) FC Nantes	Bergerac
19:00		Report	Toloba 5', 38'; Calba 41'; Saoud 51', 80'; Robillard 55'; Paljević 67'; Éloissaint 70'; Dewannain 90+2' (o.g.)	Stadium: Stade de Campréal; Attendance: 523; Referee: Anaïs Guillaume

11 January 2026	FC Lorient (3)	1–7	(2) Le Mans FC	Ploemeur
14:30	Hoarau 70' (o.g.)	Report	Bekhti 6', 14', 34'; Dechilly 22', 49'; Chapelle 30' (pen.), 54'	Stadium: Complexe Sportif Espace FCL 2 Attendance: 106; Referee: Siham Benmahammed

11 January 2026	Paris Saint-Germain FC (1)	2–0	(2) LOSC Lille	Poissy
14:30	Kanjinga 56'; Jourde 87'	Report		Stadium: Training Center Paris Saint-Germain N°5; Attendance: 451; Referee: Agathe Kocher

11 January 2026	RC Roubaix Wervicq F. (3)	1–1 (3–4 p)	(2) US Saint-Malo	Roubaix
14:30	Belkacemi 3' (pen.)	Report	Dumets 56'	Stadium: Stade Antoine Maillard; Attendance: 330; Referee: Audrey Gerbel
	Penalties
	Baradji (penalty scored); Sissoko (penalty missed); Devleesschauwer (penalty scored); Belkacemi (penalty missed); Lejeune (penalty scored); Prette (penalty missed)		(penalty missed) Dumets; (penalty scored) Job; (penalty scored) Eninger; (penalty scored) Charpentier; (penalty missed) Aubert; (penalty scored) Babinga

11 January 2026	Stade Rennais FC (4)	0–5	(1) FC Fleury 91	Rennes
14:30		Report	Kamczyk 20', 79'; Ngock 23'; Chossenotte 55'; Diaz 90+2'	Stadium: Stade Eduardo Camavinga; Attendance: 922; Referee: Manon Persichetti

11 January 2026	Havre AC (1)	4–1	(2) AJ Auxerre	Le Havre
14:30	Mendy 32'; Enguehard 84'; Effa Effa 86'; Stiévenart 88'	Report	Mabomba 90+1' (pen.)	Stadium: Stade Océane; Attendance: 346; Referee: Cécile Bessière

10 January 2026	RC Lens (1)	0–2	(1) Paris FC	Arras
15:00		Report	Håheim 14'; Le Moguédec 60'	Stadium: Stade Degouve-Brabant 3 Attendance: 232; Referee: Margaux Dru

11 January 2026	SM Caen (3)	2–2 (3–2 p)	(3) ESOF Vendée La Roche	Caen
14:30	Periot 3'; Catherine-Elasri 26'	Report	Henry 16'; Brieau 86'	Stadium: Stade de Venoix 1 - Claude-Mercier; Attendance: 921; Referee: Marine Tanguy
	Penalties
	Fall (penalty scored); Bugna (penalty missed); Benaïssa (penalty missed); Hauvet (penalty scored); Arsène (penalty scored)		(penalty scored) Lelo; (penalty missed) Bonneau; (penalty scored) Guidi; (penalty missed) Elicèche; (penalty missed) Keita

Group B

10 January 2026	AAS Sarcelles (3)	1–2	(1) Montpellier HSC	Sarcelles
14:30	Zemma 67'	Report	Kadzere 14'; Gstalter 22'	Stadium: Complexe Sportif Nelson Mandela 3 Attendance: 350; Referee: Marion Salemme

10 January 2026	Thonon Évian GG FC (2)	0–1	(1) Olympique de Marseille	Thonon-les-Bains
17:00		Report	Elisor 77'	Stadium: Stade Saint-Disdille 3 Attendance: 198; Referee: Charlène Laur

11 January 2026	Albi Marssac TF (3)	1–2	(2) Grenoble Foot 38	Albi
14:30	Cazeau 5'	Report	Mazza 78'; Fourré 90'	Stadium: Stade Maurice Rigaud N°1; Attendance: 234; Referee: Émeline Rochebilière

11 January 2026	St-Didier Espérance Pernoise (4)	0–2	(1) RC Strasbourg Alsace	Pernes-les-Fontaines
12:00		Report	Agnew 6'; Hannequin 66'	Stadium: Stade Frédéric Bernal; Attendance: 1,234; Referee: Mathilde Demoncay

10 January 2026	AS Saint-Étienne (1)	0–6	(1) OL Lyonnes	L'Étrat
14:30		Report	Chawinga 12', 80'; Hegerberg 21'; Renard 72'; Diani 85', 90'	Stadium: Complexe sportif des Ollières 1 Attendance: 418; Referee: Romy Fournier

10 January 2026	Dijon FCO (1)	4–1	(2) Toulouse FC	Dijon
12:30	Declercq 3' (pen.); Wu 15', 76'; Domin 90+2'	Report	Lapassouse 64'	Stadium: Stade Gaston Gérard; Attendance: 380; Referee: Clémence Gonçalves

11 January 2026	ESTAC Troyes (4)	1–3	(3) AS Châtenoy-le-Royal	Rosières-près-Troyes
14:30	Bouzit 2'	Report	Cleau 37'; Pochat-Cottilloux 44'; Perratone 82'	Stadium: Centre sportif de l'Aube 2 Attendance: 453; Referee: Lucie Lempereur

11 January 2026	ES Molsheim Ernolsheim (3)	1–4	(2) OGC Nice	Molsheim
14:30	Schwartz 27'	Report	Barrier 9'; Palin 21'; Soulac 72', 79'	Stadium: Parc des Sports Stadium N°2; Attendance: 393; Referee: Joana das Neves

=== Round of 16 ===
24 January 2026	FC Nantes (1)	5–0	(2) Le Mans FC	Nantes
14:30	Hoarau 15' (o.g.); Toloba 17'; Cosson 55'; Khelifi 78' (pen.); Paljević 85' (pen.)	Report		Stadium: Stade Marcel-Saupin; Attendance: 704; Referee: Audrey Gerbel

25 January 2026	Dijon FCO (1)	1–0	(1) FC Fleury	Dijon
14:30	Wu 3'	Report		Stadium: Stade Gaston Gérard; Attendance: 190; Referee: Maika Vanderstichel

24 January 2026	Paris Saint-Germain FC (1)	5–0	(1) Montpellier HSC	Poissy
14:00	Leuchter 39', 65', 69'; Groenen 59'; Kanjinga 71'	Report		Stadium: Training Center Paris Saint-Germain N°5; Attendance: 347; Referee: Alexandra Collin

25 January 2026	AS Châtenoy-le-Royal (3)	1–2	(3) SM Caen	Châtenoy-le-Royal
14:30	Bourgeois 26'	Report	Fall 40'; Brahmia-Erhel 72'	Stadium: Stade du Treffort N°1; Attendance: 574; Referee: Charlène Laur

25 January 2026	US Saint-Malo (2)	0–1	(1) Paris FC	Saint-Malo
14:00		Report	Mateo 75'	Stadium: Stade de Marville 1 Attendance: 1,238; Referee: Morgane Chignard

24 January 2026	Olympique de Marseille (1)	1–5	(1) OL Lyonnes	Martigues
16:00	Léger 82'	Report	Katoto 13', 55', 59'; Renard 43' (pen.); Bècho 45'	Stadium: Stade Francis-Turcan; Attendance: 911; Referee: Romy Fournier

25 January 2026	OGC Nice (2)	1–2	(1) Havre AC	Nice
14:30	Gomes 39'	Report	Mbakem-Niaro 18'; Rossi 58'	Stadium: Stade de la Plaine du Var N°1; Attendance: 200; Referee: Elisa Daupeux

25 January 2026	Grenoble Foot 38 (2)	0–1	(1) RC Strasbourg Alsace	Grenoble
13:00		Report	Barrett 72'	Stadium: Stade des Alpes; Attendance: 718; Referee: Cécile Bessière

=== Quarter-finals ===
15 March 2026	FC Nantes (1)	0–1	(1) RC Strasbourg Alsace	Nantes
14:30		Report	Konan 23'	Stadium: Stade Marcel-Saupin; Attendance: 1,115; Referee: Morgane Chignard

15 March 2026	SM Caen (3)	0–2	(1) Paris FC	Caen
15:00		Report	Azzaro 15', 28'	Stadium: Stade Michel d'Ornano; Attendance: 5,859; Referee: Margaux Dru

18 March 2026	OL Lyonnes (1)	7–0	(1) Havre AC	Décines-Charpieu
15:00	Svava 5'; Katoto 49', 78'; Egurrola 61'; Brand 72'; Heaps 75'; Shrader 82'	Report		Stadium: Stade Gérard Houllier; Attendance: 980; Referee: Charlène Laur

18 March 2026	Dijon FCO (1)	1–2	(1) Paris Saint-Germain	Dijon
17:00	Declercq 53' (pen.)	Report	Echegini 45+4', 87'	Stadium: Stade Gaston Gérard; Attendance: 460; Referee: Romy Fournier

=== Semi-finals ===
4 April	Paris Saint-Germain (1)	2–1	(1) Paris FC	Poissy
15:00	Ebayilin 20'; Leuchter 57' (pen.)	Report	De Almeida 3' (o.g.)	Stadium: Training Center Paris Saint-Germain N°5; Attendance: 858; Referee: Émeline Rochebilière

5 April	RC Strasbourg Alsace (1)	0–6	(1) OL Lyonnes	Molsheim
16:00		Report	Svava 3'; Katoto 5', 44' (pen.); Renard 30' (pen.); Hegerberg 34'; Shrader 73'	Stadium: Parc des Sports Stadium N°1; Attendance: 1,207; Referee: Audrey Gerbel

=== Final ===
10 May 2026
15:30

Paris Saint-Germain (1)	1–4	(1) OL Lyonnes
Kanjinga 63'	Report	Dumornay 23'; Bècho 35', 40'; Heaps 74'

Stade du Hainaut, Valenciennes
Attendance: 12,858
Referee: Elisa Daupeux

== See also ==
- 2025–26 Première Ligue
- 2025–26 Seconde Ligue
- 2025–26 Coupe LFFP
