= Khelif =

Khelif is a surname. Notable people with the surname include:

- Imane Khelif (born 1999), Algerian boxer
- Lina Khelif (born 1997), Algerian footballer
