= Fiona Liaigre =

French footballer (born 2005)

Personal information
- Full name: Fiona Maeva Liaigre
- Date of birth: 5 January 2005 (age 21)
- Place of birth: Bressuire, France
- Height: 1.58 m (5 ft 2 in)
- Position: Defender

Team information
- Current team: Paris FC
- Number: 26

Youth career
- 2010–2018: Airvo Saint-Jouin
- 2018–2020: Bressuire
- 2020–2022: Bordeaux

Senior career*
Years	Team	Apps	(Gls)
2022–2024	Bordeaux	42	(0)
2024–	Paris FC	24	(0)

International career^{‡}
2021–2022	France U17	6	(0)
2022	France U18	4	(0)
2023–2024	France U19	14	(0)
2025–	France U23	5	(0)
- * Club domestic league appearances and goals as of 05:22, 13 June 2026 (UTC) ‡ National team caps and goals as of 07:02, 22 November 2025 (UTC)

Fiona Maeva Liaigre (born 5 January 2005) is a French professional footballer who plays as a defender for Première Ligue club Paris FC.

== Youth career ==
Born in Bressuire, France, Liaigre grew up in the nearby commune of Airvault. She played football for FC Airvo Saint-Jouin from ages 5 to 11 before joining FC Bressuire at age 13. In 2020, she moved to FC Girondins de Bordeaux, where she played for Bordeaux's youth teams while simultaneously training at the Merignac Academy.

== Club career ==
=== Bordeaux ===
Liaigre debuted for the Bordeaux senior team on 26 February 2022, coming on as a late-game substitute in a match against AS Saint-Étienne. She signed her first professional contract on 4 August 2022, inking a three-year deal with Bordeaux. She kicked off her first season as a full-time member of the senior squad by playing all 90 minutes of the team's campaign-opening victory over Le Havre.

Over the course of her first senior season, Liaigre made 16 starts in 21 league appearances. The following year, she cemented herself as a regular member of Bordeaux's starting lineup and was named to captain the side on several occasions. However, at the end of the 2023–24 season, Bordeaux finished in second-to-last place and was relegated down to the Division 2 Féminine.

=== Paris FC ===
Liaigre did not end up sticking around for Bordeaux's first season in the French second division. Instead, in July 2024, she signed a three-year contract with Première Ligue team Paris FC. She missed the start of the 2024–25 season due to Patellar tendinopathy and ended up making her first appearance for Paris FC on 7 December 2024. In her debut, she started and played all 90 minutes of the team's rivalry game against Paris Saint-Germain, helping Paris FC achieve a 1–1 draw. In March 2025, she helped Paris FC advance to the 2024–25 Coupe de France final, recording an 88th-minute goal-line clearance in the team's semifinal victory over Le Havre. However, she went down with an ankle injury after playing just 8 league matches and was forced to watch from the sidelines as Paris FC won the Coupe de France for the first time in history.

== International career ==
Liaigre received her first call-up to the France youth international system in 2021, joining the under-16 national team for a training camp at INF Clairefontaine in October 2020. In 2022, she was named to the under-17 squad that was eliminated in the group stage of the 2022 FIFA U-17 Women's World Cup. Liaigre has played the bulk of her youth national team minutes with the under-19 squad, making 14 appearances across two years. At the 2023 UEFA Women's Under-19 Championship, she had a successful tournament as France were eliminated by Germany in the semifinals.
