= Morgane Martins =

Portuguese footballer (born 1998)

Personal information
- Date of birth: 3 January 1998 (age 28)
- Place of birth: Montluçon, France
- Height: 1.55 m (5 ft 1 in)
- Position: Defender

Team information
- Current team: Fleury
- Number: 25

Youth career
- 2013–2014: Yzeure

Senior career*
| Years | Team | Apps | (Gls) |
| 2014–2016 | Yzeure | 33 | (0) |
| 2016–2021 | Saint-Étienne | 58 | (0) |
| 2021–2022 | Issy | 22 | (0) |
| 2022–2024 | Dijon | 42 | (0) |
| 2024– | Fleury | 37 | (2) |

International career^{‡}
| 2021 | Portugal B | 3 | (0) |
- * Club domestic league appearances and goals as of 05:15, 13 June 2026 (UTC) ‡ National team caps and goals as of 29 November 2021

Morgane Martins (born 3 January 1998) is a footballer who plays as a defender for Division 1 Féminine club Fleury. Born in France, she represents Portugal.
