= Cindy Caputo =

French footballer (born 1999)

Personal information
- Date of birth: 7 February 1999 (age 27)
- Place of birth: Aix-en-Provence, France
- Height: 1.68 m (5 ft 6 in)
- Position: Forward

Team information
- Current team: Fleury
- Number: 18

Youth career
- 2005–2010: USM Meyreuil
- 2010–2013: Biver Sports
- 2013–2014: FC Rousset SVO
- 2014–2015: Marseille

Senior career*
Years	Team	Apps	(Gls)
2015–2020	Marseille	82	(26)
2020–2025	Saint-Étienne	87	(32)
2025–	Fleury	27	(7)

International career
2015	France U16	1	(0)
2015	France U17	2	(0)
2017–2018	France U19	13	(0)
2025	France U23	1	(0)
2024	France	2	(0)
Medal record
Representing France
Women's football
UEFA Women's Under-19 Championship
Runner-up	2017 Northern Ireland
- * Club domestic league appearances and goals as of 22:28, 18 November 2026 (UTC)

Cindy Caputo (born 7 February 1999) is a French professional footballer who plays as a forward for Première Ligue club Fleury.

== International career ==
Caputo has represented France at various youth levels. In October 2024, she received her first call-up to the France national team, becoming the first Saint-Étienne player to receive a France call-up since Camille Catala in 2012. She made her debut on 25 October 2024 in a 3–0 win against Jamaica.

== Personal life ==
Caputo considers Lionel Messi and Hatem Ben Arfa her football inspirations.

== Career statistics ==
=== International ===
As of match played 29 October 2024

Appearances and goals by national team and year
National team	Year	Apps	Goals
France	2024	2	0
Total		2	0

== Honours ==
Marseille

- Seconde Ligue: 2015–16

Saint-Étienne

- Seconde Ligue: 2022–23

France U19

- UEFA Women's Under-19 Championship runner-up: 2017
