= Lina Khelif =

Algerian footballer (born 1997)

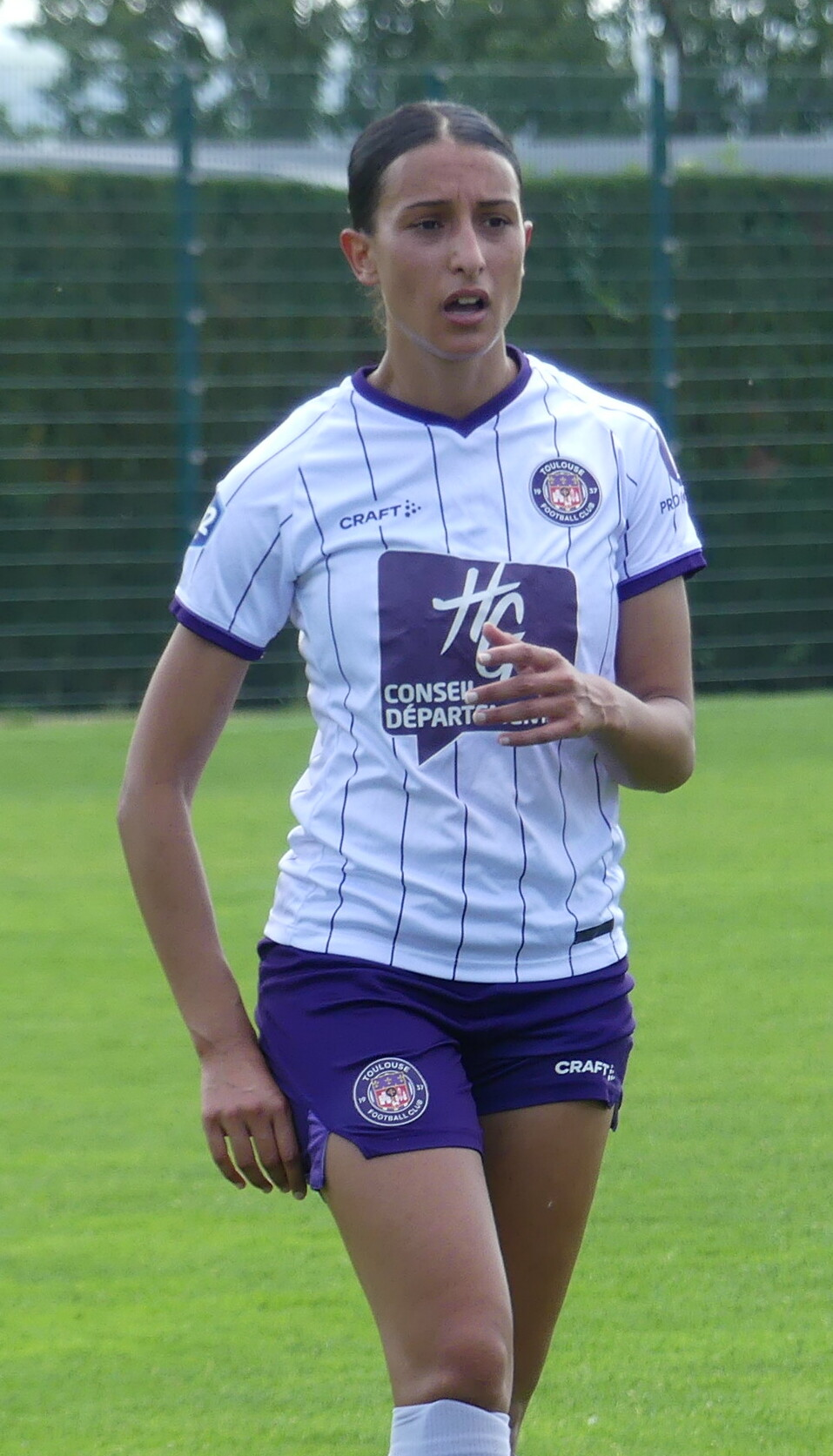
- Khelif with Toulouse in 2023

Personal information
- Date of birth: 27 January 1997 (age 29)
- Place of birth: Lyon, France
- Position: Midfielder

Team information
- Current team: Thonon Évian
- Number: 27

Senior career*
Years	Team	Apps	(Gls)
2016–2018	Grenoble	27	(7)
2018–2019	Ambilly	22	(5)
2019–2021	Thonon Evian	11	(1)
2021–2022	Saint-Malo	21	(0)
2022–2023	Toulouse	18	(1)
2023–	Thonon Evian	12	(1)

International career^{‡}
2018–	Algeria	2	(0)
- * Club domestic league appearances and goals as of 17 March 2024 ‡ National team caps and goals as of 20 June 2019

Lina Khelif (Arabic: لينا خليف; born 27 January 1997) is a professional footballer who plays as a midfielder for Seconde Ligue club Thonon Évian. Born in France, she represents Algeria at international level, having appeared in two matches at the 2018 Africa Women Cup of Nations.
