= Mathilde Bourdieu =

French footballer (born 1999)

Personal information
- Date of birth: 15 April 1999 (age 27)
- Place of birth: Paris, France
- Height: 1.65 m (5 ft 5 in)
- Position: Forward

Team information
- Current team: Marseille
- Number: 9

Youth career
- 2004–2006: AS Pompignan
- 2006–2015: Toulouse

Senior career*
Years	Team	Apps	(Gls)
2015–2016	Toulouse	12	(5)
2016–2025	Paris FC (Note: Known as FCF Juvisy during the 2016–17 season.)	122	(38)
2025–	Marseille	31	(13)

International career
2015	France U16	2	(2)
2015–2016	France U17	7	(0)
2017–2018	France U19	8	(3)
2017–2018	France U20	4	(0)
2018–2022	France U23	3	(0)
2023	France	1	(0)
Medal record
Representing France
Women's football
UEFA Women's Under-19 Championship
Runner-up	2017 Northern Ireland
- * Club domestic league appearances and goals as of 20 November 2026

Mathilde Bourdieu (born 15 April 1999) is a French professional footballer who plays as a forward for Première Ligue club Les Marseillaises.

== Club career ==
Bourdieu is a youth academy graduate of Toulouse. She made her senior team debut on 15 March 2015 in a 1–0 win against Claix.

Bourdieu joined Paris FC in 2016 and signed her first professional contract with the club in December 2017. On 26 February 2023, she signed a contract extension until June 2025.

In June 2025, Bourdieu joined Marseille.

== International career ==
As a youth international, Bourdieu was part of France under-19 team which finished as runners-up at the 2017 UEFA Women's Under-19 Championship. She made her senior team debut on 31 October 2023 in a goalless draw against Norway.

== Career statistics ==
=== International ===
As of match played 30 October 2023

Appearances and goals by national team and year
National team	Year	Apps	Goals
France	2023	1	0
Total		1	0

== Honours ==
Paris FC

- Coupe de France Féminine: 2024–25

Individual

- UEFA Women's Under-19 Championship team of the tournament: 2017
- LFFP Première Ligue team of the season: 2025–26
