= Shana Battouri =

Algerian footballer (born 2002)

Personal information
- Date of birth: 2 July 2002 (age 24)
- Place of birth: Corbeil-Essonnes, France
- Height: 1.68 m (5 ft 6 in)
- Position: Forward

Team information
- Current team: Metz
- Number: 15

Youth career
- 2017–2018: Paris Saint-Germain
- 2018–2021: Lyon

Senior career*
Years	Team	Apps	(Gls)
2021	Brest	0	(0)
2021–2022	Soyaux	21	(1)
2022–2023	Issy	20	(4)
2023–2024	Metz	18	(1)
2024–	Saint-Denis	4	(2)

International career^{‡}
2023–	Algeria	6	(1)
- * Club domestic league appearances and goals as of 13 October 2024 ‡ National team caps and goals as of 5 March 2024

Shana Battouri (Arabic: شانا باتوري; born 2 July 2002) is a professional footballer who plays as a forward for Division 3 Féminine club Saint-Denis. Born in France, she represents Algeria at international level.

== Club career ==
Battouri begins her training at Paris Saint-Germain for one year, then she signs with Olympique Lyonnais and plays there for three seasons with the under-19 team.

On 5 February 2021, She signs her first professional contract with Stade Brestois 29 in Division 2 Féminine. But ultimately, she leaves the club five months later without playing a single match.

In July 2021, She joined ASJ Soyaux-Charente in Division 1 Féminine.

On 20 July 2022, She moved to GPSO 92 Issy in Division 2 Féminine. A season later she joined FC Metz.

== International career ==
In July 2023, Battouri got her first call-up to the Algerian national team by coach Farid Benstiti to take part in a double-header against Senegal. On 14 July 2023, she made her debut starting in a 1–3 loss to the Senegalese team.

In February 2024, At a preparatory training camp for the upcoming 2024 Women's Africa Cup of Nations, she netted her first international goal against Burkina Faso on 24 February 2024, securing a 2–0 victory in a friendly match.

== Career statistics ==
=== Club ===
As of 31 March 2024

Appearances and goals by club, season and competition
Club	Season	League			Cup		Continental		Other		Total	
Club	Season	Division	Apps	Goals	Apps	Goals	Apps	Goals	Apps	Goals	Apps	Goals
Stade brestois 29	2021	Division 2 Féminine	—		—		—		—		19	8
ASJ Soyaux-Charente	2021–22	Division 1 Féminine	21	1	2	1	—		—		23	2
ASJ Soyaux-Charente	Total		21	1	2	1	—		—		23	2
GPSO 92 Issy	2022–23	Division 2 Féminine	20	4	2	3	—		—		22	7
GPSO 92 Issy	Total		20	4	2	3	—		—		22	7
FC Metz	2023–24	Division 2 Féminine	10	1	1	0	—		—		11	1
FC Metz	Total		10	1	1	0	—		—		11	1
Career total			51	6	5	4	—		—		56	10

=== International ===
As of match played 27 February 2024

Year	Algeria	
Year	Apps	Goals
2023	4	0
2024	2	1
Total	6	1

Scores and results list Algeria's goal tally first, score column indicates score after each Bttouri goal.

List of international goals scored by Shana Battouri
No.	Date	Venue	Opponent	Score	Result	Competition
1	24 February 2024	Centre Technique National de Sidi Moussa, Algiers, Algeria	Burkina Faso	1–0	2–0	International Friendly
