= Sarah Cambot =

French footballer

Personal information
- Full name: Sarah Cambot
- Date of birth: 4 January 1993 (age 33)
- Place of birth: Oloron-Sainte-Marie
- Height: 1.66 m (5 ft 5 in)
- Position: Forward

Team information
- Current team: Saint-Étienne
- Number: 9

Senior career*
Years	Team	Apps	(Gls)
2008-2015	Blanquefortaise	143	(54)
2016-2018	Bordeaux	44	(6)
2018-2020	Soyaux	36	(10)
2020-2024	Guingamp	86	(21)
2024-	Saint-Étienne	24	(2)
- * Club domestic league appearances and goals as of 2 October 2025

Sarah Cambot (born 4 January 1993) is a French footballer who plays as forward for Saint-Étienne in the Première Ligue.

Cambot has previously played for Bordeaux, and En Avant Guingamp.
