= Stade Adolphe-Chéron =

Stadium in Saint-Maur-des-Fossés, France

- Location within France
- Address: 2 Avenue de Neptune 94100 Saint-Maur-des-Fossés, Val-de-Marne
- Coordinates: 48.8072°N 2.4947°E
- Owner: Ville de Saint-Maur-des-Fossés
- Capacity: 3500

Construction
- Built: 1922

Tenants
- US Lusitanos Saint-Maur; VGA Saint-Maur

The Stade Adolphe-Chéron is the main stadium for football and athletics in the city of Saint-Maur-des-Fossés, France.

== Description ==
The stadium has a capacity of 3,500. It is used by the football clubs US Lusitanos Saint-Maur and VGA Saint-Maur.

== History ==
=== Olympic Stadium Saint-Maur Park ===
In 1912, Phileas Vassal bequeathed 37 hectares of land to the city of Saint-Maur. The will stipulated that the plot must be divided up and it must be devoted to sports played by "both sexes". The Company of the Olympic Stadium was created in 1920 to manage and operate the site. Under the leadership of Adolphe Cheron, construction of the stadium began in early 1920 and was completed in May 1922. The opening of the stadium, which at that time could accommodate 10,000 spectators, took place 28 May 1922. The Henry Paté gym is also situated on the site.

The stadium hosted the Ladies Athletics Championships of France in 1929, 1933 and 1934.

The stadium underwent superficial renovations between 1943 and 1951.

=== Stade Adolphe-Chéron ===
The stadium was renamed Stade Adolphe-Chéron on 24 May 1952 and underwent further renovations between 1958 and 1973, including the installation of permanent lighting on 19 November 1964. Previously, the lighting was only partial and had to be supplemented for nighttime events, such as the famous "Saint-Maur," athletics meetings. These evening athletics events saw Michel Jazy break several world records:

- on 27 June 1962, Jazy beat the world record in the 3,000 meters in 7:49.2.
- on 2 June 1965, Jazy beats the world record in the mile in 3:55.5,
- the 12 October1966, Jazy bade farewell to the competition by beating the world record in the 2,000 meters (4:56.1).

Other international athletics records are set at the stadium were:

- Hervé Encausse beat the European record in the Pole vault on 5 June 1968 (5,37 m).
- Guy Drut beat the world record for 110 meters hurdles on 23 July 1975 (13.1).

The stadium was renovated again between 1987 and 1988, with the erection of a new main stand of 680 seats. This stand, named after Michel Jazy, was inaugurated on 9 October 1988.

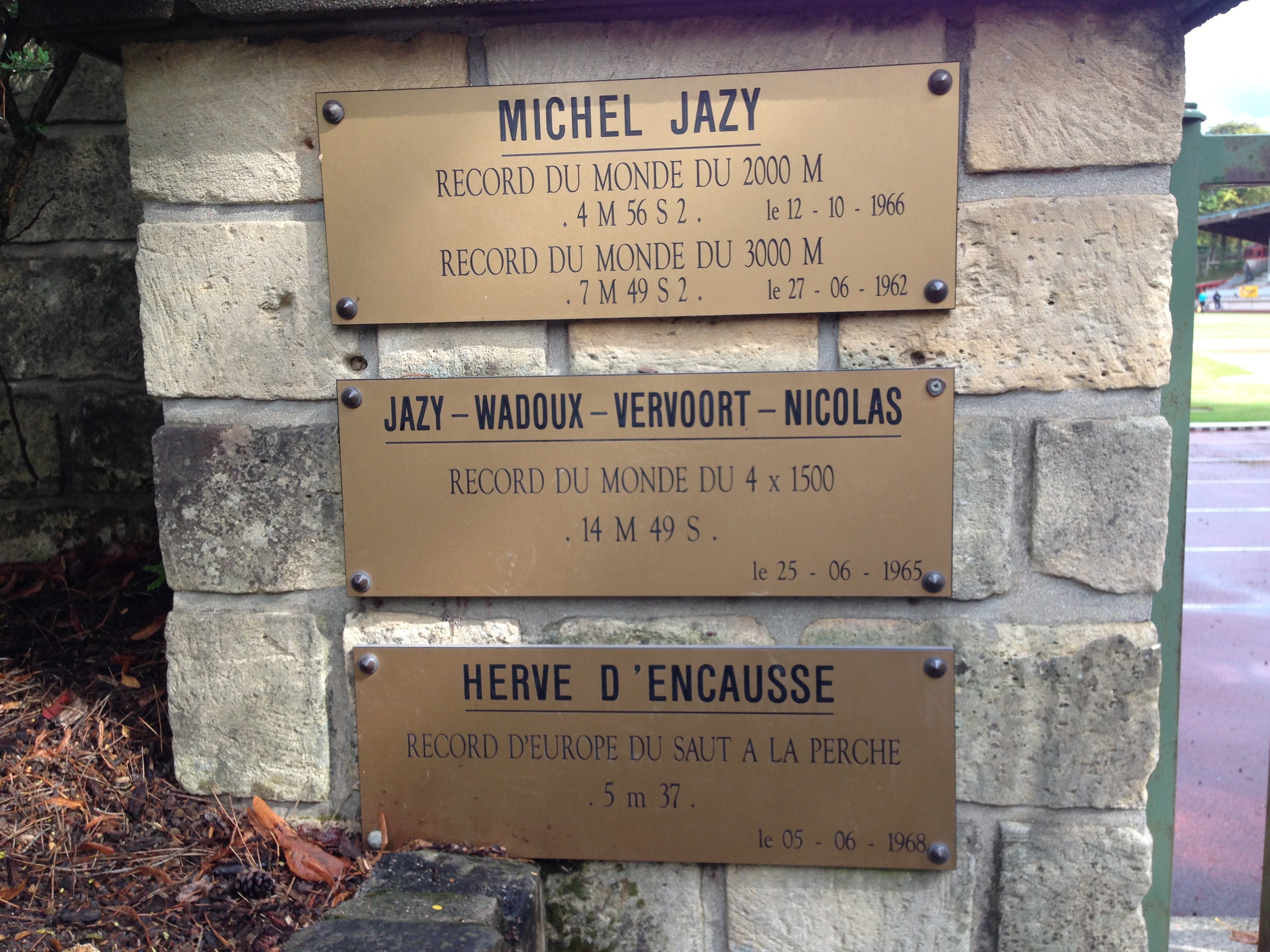
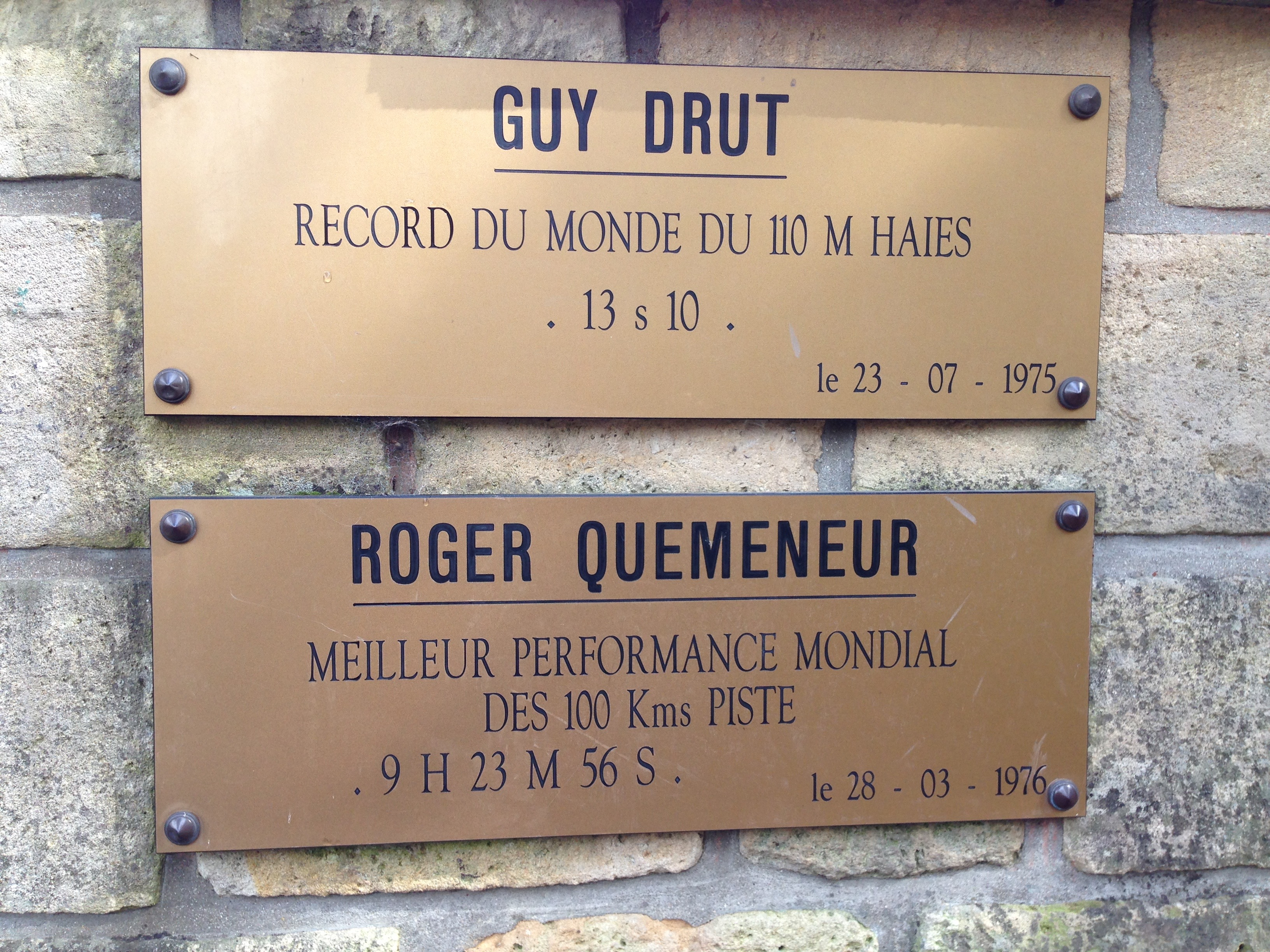
