= Estelle Laurier =

French footballer (born 1998)

Personal information
- Date of birth: 16 January 1998 (age 28)
- Height: 1.68 m (5 ft 6 in)
- Position: Defender

Team information
- Current team: Metz

International career
Years	Team	Apps	(Gls)
2014	France U16	3	(0)
2014–2015	France U17	14	(0)

Estelle Laurier is a French footballer who plays for Metz. She has previously played for Essen.
