= Kenza Chapelle =

Moroccan footballer (born 2002)

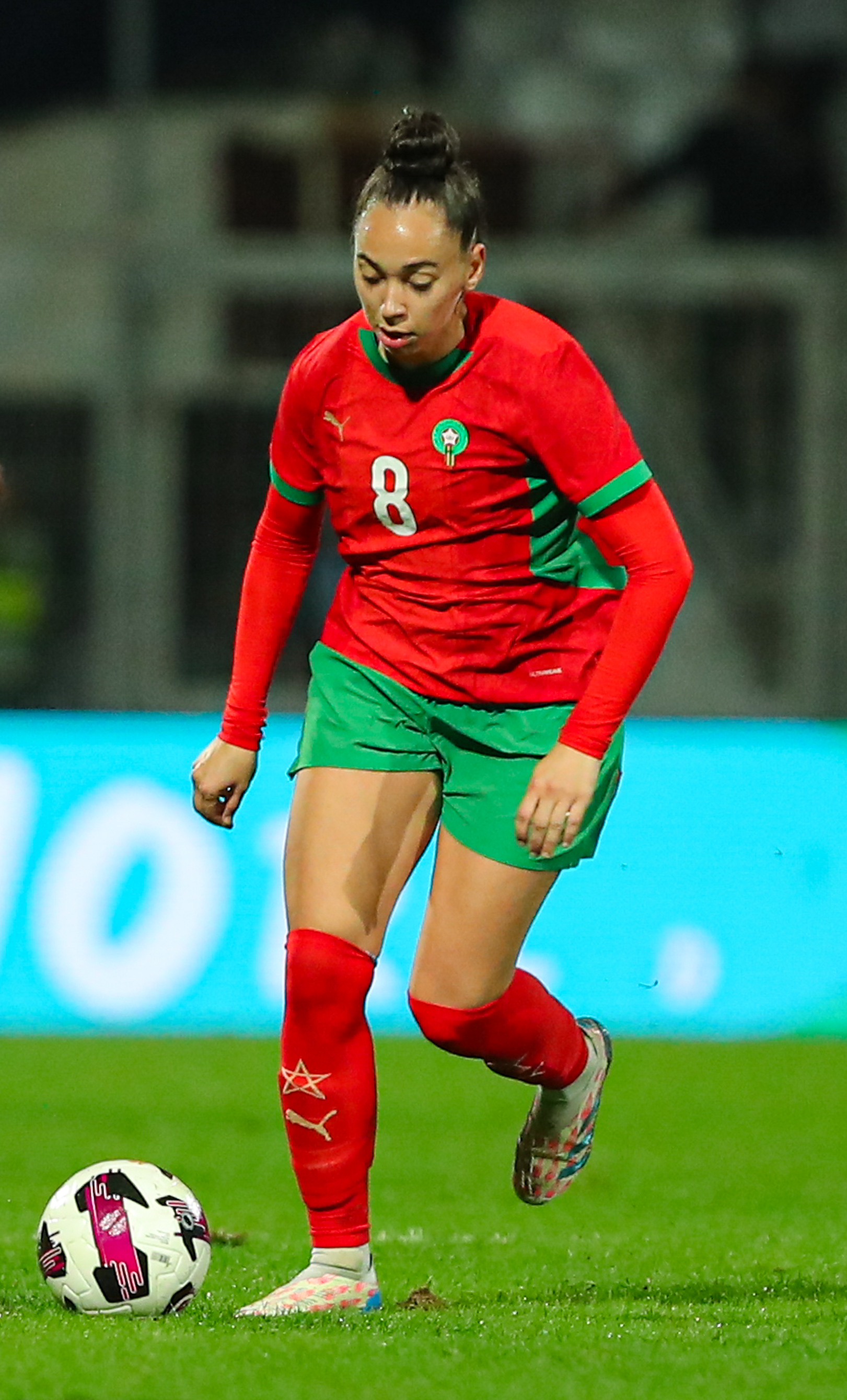

Personal information
- Date of birth: 22 August 2002 (age 24)
- Place of birth: Montreuil, France
- Height: 1.65 m (5 ft 5 in)
- Position: Forward

Team information
- Current team: Strasbourg
- Number: 19

Youth career
- 2010–2014: FC Romainville
- 2014–2016: Gallia Lucciana
- 2016–2017: AC Ajaccio
- 2017–2018: Gallia Lucciana

Senior career*
Years	Team	Apps	(Gls)
2018–2020	Saint-Maur	27	(8)
2020–2022	Fleury	28	(3)
2022–2023	Nantes	22	(2)
2023–	Strasbourg	23	(13)

International career^{‡}
2018	France U16	5	(1)
2018–2019	France U17	8	(3)
2019	France U19	5	(4)
2020	France U20	1	(0)
2023–	Morocco		
- * Club domestic league appearances and goals as of 27 September 2024 ‡ National team caps and goals as of 30 May 2024

Kenza Chapelle (Arabic: كنزة شابيل; born 22 August 2002) is a professional footballer who plays as a forward for Première Ligue club Strasbourg. Born in France, she plays for the Morocco national team.

== Personal life ==
Born in France, Chapelle is of Moroccan descent and holds dual citizenship.
