= Tatiana Solanet =

French footballer (born 1992)

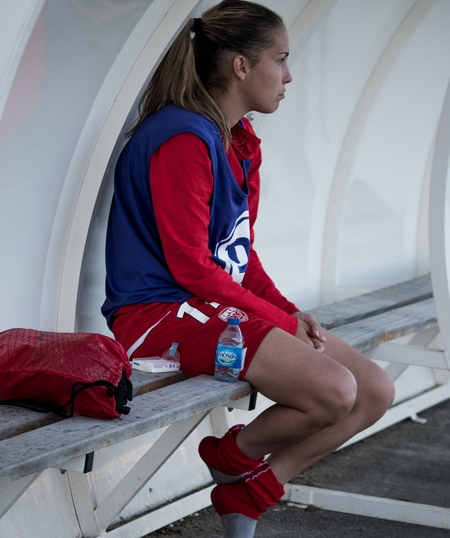

Personal information
- Date of birth: 28 August 1992 (age 34)
- Place of birth: Besançon, France
- Height: 5 ft 7 in (1.71 m)
- Position: Midfielder

Tatiana Solanet (born 28 August 1992) is a French footballer who plays as a midfielder for Dijon.
