= Seynabou Mbengue =

Senegalese footballer (born 1992)

Personal information
- Date of birth: 15 March 1992 (age 34)
- Place of birth: Diourbel, Senegal
- Height: 1.64 m (5 ft 5 in)
- Position: Forward

Team information
- Current team: Metz
- Number: 8

Senior career*
Years	Team	Apps	(Gls)
2019–2020	Valenciennes		
2020–2022	Yzeure	24	(17)
2022–2023	Nantes	14	(1)
2023–2024	Montauban	16	(9)
2024–	Metz	5	(2)

International career^{‡}
2016	Senegal	2	(0)
- * Club domestic league appearances and goals as of 20 October ‡ National team caps and goals as of 19 March 2016

Seynabou Mbengue (born 15 March 1992) is a Senegalese professional footballer who plays as a forward for Seconde Ligue club Metz. She has been a member of the Senegal national team.

== Club career ==
Mbengue has played for Valenciennes FC and Yzeure in France.

== International career ==
Mbengue capped for Senegal at senior level during the 2016 Africa Women Cup of Nations qualification.
