= Sana Guermazi =

French-Tunisian footballer (born 2001)

Personal information
- Date of birth: 3 November 2001 (age 25)
- Place of birth: Clichy, France
- Height: 1.60 m (5 ft 3 in)
- Position: Midfielder

Team information
- Current team: Le Mans
- Number: 7

Youth career
- 2016–2020: Paris Saint-Germain

Senior career*
Years	Team	Apps	(Gls)
2020–2021	CD Pozoalbense	22	(1)
2021–2022	FF La Solana	20	(3)
2022–2024	Montauban	44	(6)
2024–	Le Mans	8	(2)

International career
2018	France U18	0	(0)
2023–	Tunisia	4	(0)
- * Club domestic league appearances and goals as of 14 November 2024

Sana Guermazi (Arabic: سناء القرمازي; born 3 November 2001) is a professional footballer who plays as a midfielder for Seconde Ligue club Le Mans. Born in France, she plays for the Tunisia national team.

== Early life ==
Born in Clichy, France, Guermazi is of Tunisian descent with roots in Sfax.

== Club caree ==
On 5 June 2020, Guermazi signed her first professional contract with the Spanish Segunda División Pro side CD Pozoalbense. In July 2021, she joined fellow Spanish club FF La Solana.

On 24 June 2024, Le Mans announced the signing of the Tunisian international ahead of the 2024–25 Seconde Ligue season. On 12 December 2024, she was named Player of the Month for November.

== International career ==
Born in France, Guermazi represented her country of birth at the youth level before opting to play for Tunisia at the senior level.

In 2018, The Parisian has been first called up by the coach of the France U18 women's team, Gaëlle Dumas, to take part in a training camp from 23 to 25 October 2018 at the INF in Clairefontaine.

Proud to represent Tunisia in my first official match.

— Sana Guermazi.

In February 2024, she received a call-up to the Tunisia women's national football team for a doubleheader against Morocco in the 2024 Summer Olympic Qualifiers. On 23 February 2024, She made her debut for the team in a 1–2 loss to Morocco in Soliman, Tunisia.

=== International goals ===
No.	Date	Venue	Opponent	Score	Result	Competition
1.	8 June 2026	EFA Center, Cairo	Egypt	2–1	2–2 (a.e.t.) (6–7 p)	Friendly
