= Anaïs Ribeyra =

French association footballer (born 1992)

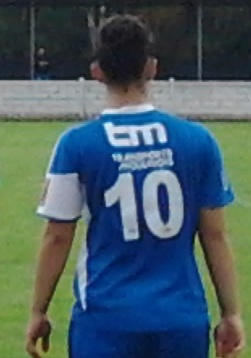

Personal information
- Full name: Anaïs Ribeyra
- Date of birth: 5 May 1992 (age 34)
- Place of birth: Albstadt, Germany
- Height: 1.69 m (5 ft 7 in)
- Position: Forward

Team information
- Current team: Lille
- Number: 14

Youth career
- Lyon

Senior career*
Years	Team	Apps	(Gls)
2009-2011	Guingamp	24	(5)
2011-2012	Yzeure	22	(11)
2012-2013	Saint-Étienne	14	(3)
2013-2015	Rodez AF	36	(14)
2015-2016	Tremblay	1	(0)
2015-2017	Grenoble	14	(21)
2017-2018	Brest	18	(18)
2018-2019	Saint-Ètienne	9	(3)
2018-2019	Brest	11	(7)
2019-2020	Yzeure	15	(15)
2020-2022	Nantes	15	(16)
2022-	Lille	24	(7)

International career
- France (women U-19)
- * Club domestic league appearances and goals as of 26 May 2024 (UTC)

Anaïs Ribeyra (born 5 May 1992) is a French footballer playing as a striker at Lille.

== International career ==
Ribeyra has represented France at youth level.
