= Anna Conesa =

French footballer (born 2003)

Personal information
- Date of birth: 16 July 2003 (age 23)
- Place of birth: Marseille, France
- Height: 1.70 m (5 ft 7 in)
- Positions: Midfielder; forward

Team information
- Current team: Lille LOSC
- Number: 18

Youth career
- 2016–2020: Olympique de Marseille

Senior career*
Years	Team	Apps	(Gls)
2019–2024	Olympique de Marseille	48	(10)
2024–	Lille LOSC	27	(12)

International career
2020	France U17	0	(0)
- * Club domestic league appearances and goals as of 9 November 2025

Anna Conesa (born 16 July 2003) is a French professional footballer who plays as a midfielder for Seconde Ligue club Lille.

== Club career ==
Born in Marseille, she began her football career in 2016 with the academy of the city's biggest club, Olympique de Marseille, where she remained until 2019. She was then promoted to the first team for the 2019–20 Division 1 Féminine season. Afterward, she spent four seasons with the club competing in Division 2 Féminine before eventually departing.

On 29 July 2024, Lille announced the signing of Conesa on a two-year deal.

== Career statistics ==
=== Club ===
As of match played 9 November 2025

Appearances and goals by club, season and competition
Club	Season	League			National cup		League cup		Total	
Club	Season	Division	Apps	Goals	Apps	Goals	Apps	Goals	Apps	Goals
Marseille	2019–20	D1	7	0	1	0	—		8	0
Marseille	2020–21	D2	2	0	—		—		2	0
Marseille	2021–22	D2	5	2	—		—		5	2
Marseille	2022–23	D2	16	5	3	0	—		19	5
Marseille	2023–24	D2	14	1	—		—		14	1
Marseille	Total		44	8	4	0	—N/a		48	8
Lille	2024–25	SL	14	4	4	5	—		18	9
Lille	2025–26	SL	7	2			2	1	9	3
Lille	Total		21	6	4	5	2	1	27	12
Career total			65	14	8	5	2	1	75	20
