= Thonon Evian Grand Genève FC (women) =

Thonon Évian
- Full name: Thonon Évian Grand Genève Football Club
- Founded: 2013
- Ground: Stade Camille-Fournier, Évian-les-Bains
- Capacity: 1,500
- Manager: (France) Wahid Chaouki
- League: Seconde Ligue
- 2025–26: Seconde Ligue, 7th of 12
- Website: Official Website
Home colours	Away colours

Thonon Évian Grand Genève Football Club, simply known as Thonon Évian is a French professional women's football club based in Ambilly. they compete in the Seconde Ligue, the second-tier division of French women's football.

== History ==
In 2013, the club became the women's section of Évian Thonon Gaillard Football Club. Serge Garcia, president of the Ambilly club, clarified that his organization remained a completely independent entity from the men's club with its own structure, budget, and history.

In 2016, Évian Thonon Gaillard went bankrupt. The women's section became fully independent again and was renamed "Croix de Savoie Football Academy." The club adopted the name and colors of Football Croix-de-Savoie 74, gaining the support of the former ultras of that club.

In 2017, the club earned promotion to Division 2 after a playoff victory against Bischheim. The season started poorly, with the team collecting just one point from their first 10 matches. However, a crucial win in the final match of the first half of the season against Montauban restored hope. A strong second half of the campaign, including an unbeaten home record, secured the team's maintenance with a ninth-place finish in the league. The 2018–19 season saw the team finish in fifth place in Group B. The team achieved a club record with seven consecutive victories during the season.

In June 2019, the Croix de Savoie Football Academy Ambilly women's team joined Thonon Évian Football Club, the successor to the former professional club Évian Thonon Gaillard Football Club, which went bankrupt in 2016. The new entity was named "Thonon Évian Grand Genève Football Club," with the Ambilly club becoming the women's section of the newly formed club.

In March 2023, the club achieved its best result in the Coupe de France Féminine, reaching the semi-finals after defeating Marseille. They were ultimately eliminated by PSG with a 1–0 loss, finishing the competition on a strong note.

== Players ==
=== Current squad ===
As of 28 November 2024.

Note: Flags indicate national team as defined under FIFA eligibility rules; some limited exceptions apply. Players may hold more than one non-FIFA nationality.

No.	Pos.	Nation	Player
—	GK	FRA	Ella Desjardins
1	GK	FRA	Éva Danjou
2	DF	FRA	Alexia Trevisan (captain)
3	DF	FRA	Maureen Palma
5	DF	SEN	Wolimata Ndiaye
6	DF	SUI	Céline Von Potobsky
7	MF	FRA	Anna Clerac
8	MF	ALG	Lina Khelif
9	FW	TUN	Salma Zemzem
10	MF	CAN	Maya Ladhani
11	MF	MAR	Djennah Cherif

No.	Pos.	Nation	Player
13	MF	FRA	Coline Stephen
15	FW	ALG	Laura Taleb Muller
16	GK	CAN	Marika Laurendeau
18	MF	FRA	Lisa Nicot
19	DF	FRA	Lalie Valentino
20	MF	FRA	Marine Furet
21	FW	SEN	Coumba Sylla Mbodji
22	FW	TOG	Mafille Woedikou
23	MF	FRA	Liana Priol
25	MF	FRA	Margot Esposito
30	GK	USA	Maleni Morales

== Coaching staff ==
As of 28 November 2024.

Position	Name
Head coach	(France) Wahid Chaouki
Assistant coach	(France) Thibault Gaborit
Video Analyst	(France) Téo Lépine
Team manager	(Brazil) Mayra Da Silva
French: Intendant	(France) François Vesin
