= FC Fleury 91 (women) =

Football club in Fleury-Mérogis, France

Fleury
- Full name: Football Club Fleury 91 Cœur d'Essonne
- Nickname: Les Essonniennes
- Founded: 2003 as FCF Val d'Orge; 2017 as FCF 91 Cœur d'Essonne
- Ground: Stade Auguste Gentelet
- Capacity: 2,000
- President: Daniel Carric
- Manager: Antoine Ponroy
- League: Première Ligue
- 2025–26: Première Ligue, 5th of 12
- Website: https://www.fcfleury91.fr/

FC Fleury 91 Cœur d'Essonne is a French women's football club based in Fleury-Mérogis. They currently play in the Première Ligue, the first division of women's football in France. They have played in this league since 2017.

== History ==
The club was founded in 2003 as FCF Val d'Orge, initially to train two teams of young players. The next season, they fused with a senior team. In 2006, the senior team reached the Division d'Honneur. In 2012, they were promoted to the Division 2 Féminine in 2012.

In 2017, after winning the Division 2 season, then-FCF Val d'Orge was promoted to Division 1 Féminine, now known as the Première Ligue. The club then joined with the Championnat National 2 men's section FC Fleury 91 and was renamed.

== Honours ==
- Division 2 Féminine (Level 2)
  - Winners (1): 2017

== Players ==
=== First team squad ===
As of 28 August 2026

Note: Flags indicate national team as defined under FIFA eligibility rules; some limited exceptions apply. Players may hold more than one non-FIFA nationality.

No.	Pos.	Nation	Player
1	GK	FIN	Katriina Talaslahti
2	DF	FRA	Aude Bizet
4	DF	FRA	Léna Goetsch
5	MF	FRA	Laurie Cance
6	MF	AUS	Clara Hoarau
7	FW	FRA	Shana Chossenotte
8	MF	ITA	Erin Cesarini (on loan from AC Milan)
9	FW	FRA	Louna Ribadeira (on loan from Chelsea)
10	DF	FRA	Annaïg Butel
11	FW	FRA	Emelyne Laurent
12	DF	CMR	Falone Meffometou

No.	Pos.	Nation	Player
15	MF	FRA	Cyrielle Blanc
18	FW	FRA	Cindy Caputo
19	MF	DEN	Sarah Sundahl
20	DF	FRA	Charlotte Fernandes
21	DF	SRB	Alexsandra Gajić
25	MF	FRA	Tania Maximino Marques
29	MF	FRA	Salima Sidi Moussa
40	GK	ALG	Amira Benaïssa
63	DF	HAI	Kethna Louis
96	GK	ALG	Chloé N'Gazi
99	FW	FRA	Lucie Calba

=== Out on loan ===
Note: Flags indicate national team as defined under FIFA eligibility rules; some limited exceptions apply. Players may hold more than one non-FIFA nationality.

No.	Pos.	Nation	Player
—	FW	FRA	Naomi Ekwalla Essaka (at Thonon Evian Grand Genève)

== Current staff ==
As of 10 March 2024.

Position	Name
Head coach	(France) Fabrice Abriel
Assistant coach	(France) Antoine Ponroy
Goalkeeper coach	(France) Alexy Kastelyn
Strength and Conditioning Coach	(France) Nicolas Colard
Psychologist	(Democratic Republic of the Congo) Philippe Kaza Ngo
Team Managers	(France) David Fanzel
Team Managers	(France) Milan Nowak
Video Analyst	(France) Amr Charoud
