= Les Marseillaises =

French women's football club, based in Marseille

- Full name: Les Marseillaises
- Nickname: Les Phocéennes
- Short name: Olympique Marseille; Marseille; OM
- Founded: 2011
- Ground: Stade Francis Turcan
- Capacity: 8,500
- President: (Spain) Pablo Longoria
- Manager: (France) Corinne Diacre
- League: Première Ligue
- 2025–26: Première Ligue, 9th of 12
- Website: om.fr/team/women
Home colours	Away colours	Third colours

Les Marseillaises is a French women's football club based in Marseille, commonly referred to as Olympique de Marseille, Marseille, or simply OM IPA: [o.ɛm], locally [oˈɛmə]). It operates as the women's section of football club Olympique de Marseille.

== History ==
Olympique de Marseille was already active in women's football in the 1920s, making it one of the few active women's teams that took part in its original incarnation in pioneering the game in the interwars period. The team disappeared in the 1930s along with the other women's teams of the time, but it was reactivated when French women's football competitions returned in the 1970s and from 1975 it took part in the French championship, which later became the current national league. In 1979 it reached the championship's semifinals, but in 1983 it was relegated and three years later it disappeared.

In the 2011–12 season Olympique de Marseille created its women's team for the third time. It reached the second tier in the 2014–15 and in the 2016–17 it made its debut in the top tier with a 4th position.

On 12 September 2025, Olympique Marseille announced that its women's section would be known going forward as Les Marseillaises. The women's section adopted its own new emblem inspired by the statue of "La Marseillaise", a masterpiece of the French Revolution. Les Marseillaises still wear the OM crest on their shirts.

== Players ==
=== Current squad ===
As of 9 September 2026

Note: Flags indicate national team as defined under FIFA eligibility rules; some limited exceptions apply. Players may hold more than one non-FIFA nationality.

No.	Pos.	Nation	Player
1	GK	CAN	Emily Burns
2	DF	COL	Mary Álvarez
3	DF	FRA	Julie Thibaud
4	DF	FRA	Maureen Cosson
5	MF	HAI	Maudeline Moryl
6	DF	PAN	Carina Baltrip-Reyes
7	FW	FRA	Louise Fleury
8	FW	USA	Lexi Missimo (on loan from Dallas Trinity)
9	FW	FRA	Mathilde Bourdieu
10	MF	FRA	Naomie Bamenga
11	FW	JAM	Jody Brown
12	DF	FRA	Amandine Béché
14	MF	FRA	Jenny Perret

No.	Pos.	Nation	Player
17	FW	CIV	Habibou Ouédraogo
18	MF	POR	Beatriz Fonseca
19	FW	COL	Sintia Cabezas
20	MF	FRA	Claire Lavogez
23	MF	FRA	Maëlle Garbino
24	DF	POL	Jagoda Cyraniak
26	DF	FRA	Violette Gobert
27	DF	POR	Nelly Rodrigues
30	GK	FRA	Marie-Morgane Sieber
88	MF	FRA	Salomé Elisor
99	MF	FRA	Sonia Ouchene

=== Out on loan ===
Note: Flags indicate national team as defined under FIFA eligibility rules; some limited exceptions apply. Players may hold more than one non-FIFA nationality.

No.	Pos.	Nation	Player
—	GK	FRA	Élisa Gautier (at Standard Liège until 30 June 2027)

== See also ==
- Olympique de Marseille
