= AS Saint-Étienne (women) =

French women's football club, based in Saint-Étienne

- Full name: Association Sportive de Saint-Étienne Loire Féminin
- Nickname: Les Vertes (The Greens) Les Amazones (The Amazones)
- Founded: 1977; 49 years ago, as RC Saint-Étienne; 2009; 17 years ago as AS Saint-Étienne
- Ground: Stade Salif-Keita, Saint-Étienne
- Capacity: 1,250
- President: Jean-Marc Barsotti
- Manager: Laurent Mortel
- League: Seconde Ligue
- 2025–26: Première Ligue, 12th of 12 (relegated)
- Website: http://www.asse.fr/
Home colours	Away colours	Third colours

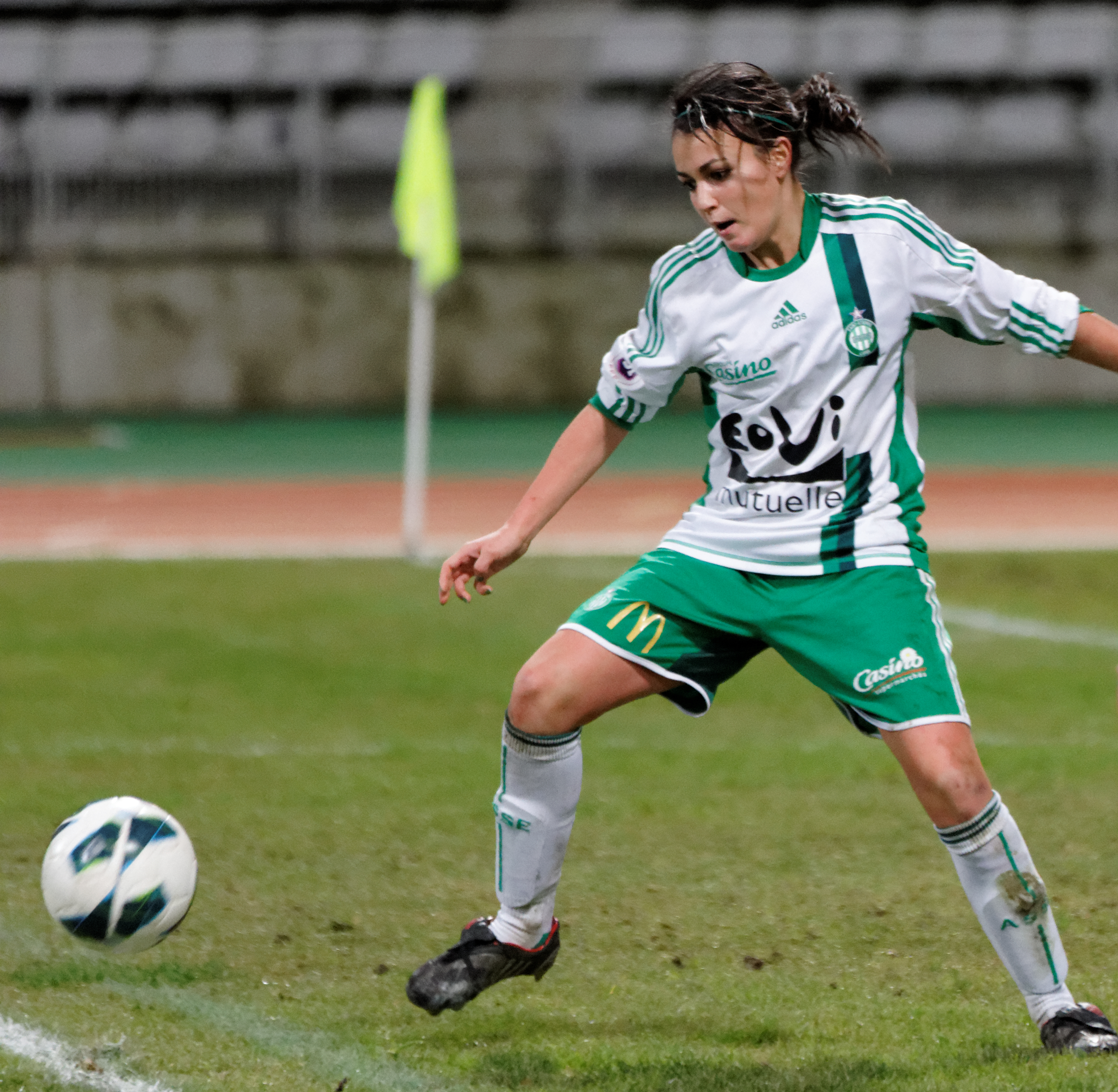
Ophélie Brevet playing for Saint-Étienne in the 2012–13 season

Association Sportive de Saint-Étienne Loire (French pronunciation: [sɛ̃t‿etjɛn lwaʁ]), commonly known as ASSE (French pronunciation: [a.ɛs.ɛs.ø]) or simply Saint-Étienne, is a professional football club based in Saint-Étienne in Auvergne-Rhône-Alpes, France. The club was founded in 1977 under the name Racing Club de Saint-Étienne. The current name was adopted following the 2008–09 season as RC Saint-Étienne merged with their men's side.

Saint-Étienne plays its home matches at the Stade Salif-Keita in Saint-Étienne which has a capacity of 1,000 spectators. They are coached by Laurent Mortel.

== Players ==
=== Current squad ===
As of 8 July 2026

Note: Flags indicate national team as defined under FIFA eligibility rules; some limited exceptions apply. Players may hold more than one non-FIFA nationality.

No.	Pos.	Nation	Player
1	GK	FRA	Emma Templier
3	DF	FRA	Chloé Tapia
4	DF	NOR	Ina Kristoffersen
6	MF	FRA	Lisa Martinez
7	FW	FRA	Adèle Connesson
8	FW	CAN	Alexandria Lamontagne
9	FW	FRA	Sarah Cambot
10	MF	USA	Rachel Corboz
11	FW	DEN	Sofie Hornemann
12	MF	HAI	Amandine Pierre-Louis
13	MF	FRA	Faustine Bataillard
14	DF	HAI	Deborah Bien-Aimé
15	DF	SRB	Aleksandra Gajić

No.	Pos.	Nation	Player
16	GK	FRA	Alice Pinguet
17	DF	FRA	Héloïse Mansuy
19	FW	FRA	Nadjma Ali Nadjim
20	DF	TTO	Kédie Johnson
21	FW	CAN	Nikolina Istocki
22	FW	BEL	Welma Fon
23	DF	ALG	Morgane Belkhiter
24	DF	USA	Moira Kelley
28	DF	USA	Hallie Meadows
29	DF	FRA	Marion Romanelli
30	GK	FRA	Alyson Sebban

=== Former notable players ===
- Karima Benameur
- Delphine Blanc
- Camille Catala
- Laura Gandonou
- Méline Gérard
- Kheira Hamraoui
- Jessica Houara
- Michèle Madeleine Ngono Mani
- Anne-Marie Bănuță
- Anne-Laure Perrot
- Fanny Tenret
- Sabrina Viguier

== Current staff ==
As of 12 March 2024.

Position	Name
Head coach	(France) Laurent Mortel
Assistant coach	(France) Marc-Antoine Brihat
Goalkeeper coach	(France) Baptiste Dumas
Physical Trainers	(France) Axel Berger
Physical Trainers	(France) Mathieu Dupré
Doctors	(France) Benoît Bouthin
Doctors	(France) Rémi Philippot
Kinesiologist	(France) Pierre-Luc Fouvet
Dietician	(France) Thomas Sabot
Team Manager	(France) Hervé Faure
Video Analyst	(France) Suzy Pasquier

== Honours ==
=== Domestic ===
- Coupe de France
  - Winners (1): 2011
  - Runner-up (1): 2013
