= 2024 Women's Africa Cup of Nations squads =

The 2024 Women's Africa Cup of Nations is an international women's association football tournament being held in Morocco from 5 to 26 July 2025. The 12 national teams involved in the tournament are required to register a squad of 24 players, including three goalkeepers. Only players in these squads are eligible to take part in the tournament. If a player becomes seriously injured or ill prior to the tournament, they may be replaced in the squad prior to their first match.

The age listed for each player is on 5 July 2025, the first day of the tournament. The club listed is the club for which the player last played a competitive match prior to the tournament. A flag is included for coaches who are of a different nationality than their own national team.

== Group A ==
=== Morocco ===
Head coach: (Spain) Jorge Vilda

Morocco announced their 26-player squad on 24 June 2025. The official list published by CAF excluded Salma Bouguerch and Rania Boutiebi, confirming their status as standby players outside the 24-player squad.

No.	Pos.	Player	Date of birth (age)	Club
1	GK	Khadija Er-Rmichi	16 September 1989 (aged 35)	(Royal Moroccan Football Federation) AS FAR
2	DF	Zineb Redouani	12 June 2000 (aged 25)	(Royal Moroccan Football Federation) AS FAR
3	DF	Nouhaila Benzina	11 May 1998 (aged 27)	(Royal Moroccan Football Federation) AS FAR
4	DF	Siham Boukhami	1 February 1992 (aged 33)	(Royal Moroccan Football Federation) AS FAR
5	MF	Sarah Kassi	9 September 2003 (aged 21)	(French Football Federation) Le Havre
6	MF	Élodie Nakkach	20 January 1995 (aged 30)	(Saudi Arabian Football Federation) Al-Ahli
7	MF	Ghizlane Chebbak (Captain)	22 February 1990 (aged 35)	(Royal Spanish Football Federation) Levante Badalona
8	FW	Kenza Chapelle	22 August 2002 (aged 22)	(French Football Federation) Strasbourg
9	FW	Ibtissam Jraïdi	9 December 1992 (aged 32)	(Saudi Arabian Football Federation) Al-Ahli
10	MF	Najat Badri	19 May 1988 (aged 37)	(Royal Moroccan Football Federation) AS FAR
11	FW	Fatima Tagnaout	20 January 1999 (aged 26)	(Royal Moroccan Football Federation) AS FAR
12	GK	Fatima Zahra El Jebraoui	8 August 2007 (aged 17)	(Royal Moroccan Football Federation) Wydad AC
13	DF	Sabah Seghir	27 September 2000 (aged 24)	(Swiss Football Association) Basel
14	DF	Aziza Rabbah	4 July 1986 (aged 39)	(Royal Moroccan Football Federation) AS FAR
15	DF	Soumia Hady	30 June 1998 (aged 27)	(Royal Moroccan Football Federation) Wydad AC
16	MF	Anissa Lahmari	17 February 1997 (aged 28)	(Royal Spanish Football Federation) Levante
17	DF	Hanane Aït El Haj	2 November 1994 (aged 30)	(Royal Spanish Football Federation) Valencia
18	MF	Sanaâ Mssoudy	30 December 1999 (aged 25)	(Royal Moroccan Football Federation) AS FAR
19	FW	Sakina Ouzraoui Diki	29 August 2001 (aged 23)	(Royal Spanish Football Federation) Tenerife
20	FW	Imane Saoud	6 June 2002 (aged 23)	(French Football Federation) Nantes
21	DF	Yasmin Mrabet	8 August 1999 (aged 25)	(Royal Spanish Football Federation) Valencia
22	GK	Inès Arouaissa	30 June 2001 (aged 24)	(French Football Federation) Saint-Malo
23	GK	Hind Hasnaoui	13 September 1996 (aged 28)	(Royal Moroccan Football Federation) AS FAR
24	MF	Imène El Ghazouani	9 June 2000 (aged 25)	(Swiss Football Association) Servette

=== Zambia ===
Head coach: (Switzerland) Nora Häuptle

Zambia announced their 24-player squad on 19 June 2025.

No.	Pos.	Player	Date of birth (age)	Club
1	GK	Catherine Musonda	20 February 1998 (aged 27)	(Football Association of Zambia) Red Arrows
2	DF	Memory Nthala	21 July 1999 (aged 25)	(Football Association of Zambia) Green Buffaloes
3	DF	Lushomo Mweemba	10 April 2001 (aged 24)	(Turkish Football Federation) Hakkarigücü Spor
4	DF	Esther Siamfuko	8 August 2004 (aged 20)	(Football Association of Zambia) Green Buffaloes
5	DF	Pauline Zulu	3 October 2004 (aged 20)	(Football Association of Zambia) ZANACO
6	MF	Mary Wilombe	22 September 1997 (aged 27)	(Football Association of Zambia) Red Arrows
7	FW	Fridah Mukoma	13 October 2006 (aged 18)	(Chinese Football Association) Beijing Jingtan
8	DF	Margaret Belemu	24 February 1997 (aged 28)	(Football Association of Zambia) Red Arrows
9	FW	Kabange Mupopo	21 September 1992 (aged 32)	(Chinese Football Association) Henan Jianye
10	MF	Grace Chanda	11 June 1997 (aged 28)	(United States Soccer Federation) Orlando Pride
11	FW	Barbra Banda (Captain)	20 March 2000 (aged 25)	(United States Soccer Federation) Orlando Pride
12	MF	Evarine Katongo	29 December 2002 (aged 22)	(Football Association of Zambia) Green Buffaloes
13	DF	Martha Tembo	8 March 1998 (aged 27)	(Turkish Football Federation) Hakkarigücü Spor
14	MF	Ireen Lungu	6 October 1997 (aged 27)	(Chinese Football Association) Sichuan
15	MF	Rhoda Chileshe	8 May 1998 (aged 27)	(Football Association of Zambia) Indeni Roses
16	GK	Mwila Chishala Mufunte	7 September 2007 (aged 17)	(Football Association of Zambia) Green Buffaloes
17	FW	Racheal Kundananji	3 June 2000 (aged 25)	(United States Soccer Federation) Bay FC
18	GK	Ngambo Musole	26 June 1998 (aged 27)	(Football Association of Zambia) Green Buffaloes
19	MF	Xiomara Mapepa	4 June 2002 (aged 23)	(Chinese Football Association) Beijing Jingtan
20	MF	Racheal Nachula	14 January 1986 (aged 39)	(Israel Football Association) Hapoel Katamon
21	MF	Mercy Chipasula	23 March 2008 (aged 17)	(Football Association of Zambia) Kamfinsa Blue Eagles
22	MF	Natasha Nanyangwe	27 June 1999 (aged 26)	(Football Association of Zambia) Green Buffaloes
23	DF	Mapalo Maluba	26 March 2007 (aged 18)	(Football Association of Zambia) Nchanga Rangers
25	MF	Prisca Chilufya	8 June 1999 (aged 26)	(United States Soccer Federation) Orlando Pride

=== Senegal ===
Head coach: Mame Moussa Cissé

Senegal announced their 24-player squad on 24 June 2025.

No.	Pos.	Player	Date of birth (age)	Club
1	GK	Khady Faye	14 January 2004 (aged 21)	(Senegalese Football Federation) Aigles de la Médina
2	DF	Marème Babou	13 April 2003 (aged 22)	(French Football Federation) Strasbourg
3	DF	Anta Dembele	15 June 1994 (aged 31)	(Senegalese Football Federation) Aigles de la Médina
4	DF	Aissatou Fall	1 December 2007 (aged 17)	(Senegalese Football Federation) Kaolack
5	DF	Wolimata Ndiaye	10 January 2004 (aged 21)	(French Football Federation) Thonon Evian
6	DF	Maty Cissokho	20 April 1998 (aged 27)	(Senegalese Football Federation) Aigles de la Médina
7	FW	Mama Diop	9 October 1994 (aged 30)	(French Football Federation) Marseille
8	MF	Dieynaba Ndaw	10 April 2003 (aged 22)	(United States Soccer Federation) Miami Hurricanes
9	FW	Nguenar Ndiaye	10 January 1995 (aged 30)	(French Football Federation) Bourges
10	MF	Ndeye Awa Diakhaté	2 January 1997 (aged 28)	(French Football Federation) Marseille
11	FW	Haby Balde	1 January 2000 (aged 25)	(French Football Federation) ES Trois Cités Poitiers
12	MF	Safietou Sagna	11 April 1994 (aged 31)	(French Football Federation) Saint-Malo
13	DF	Adama Sane	8 March 2005 (aged 20)	(Royal Moroccan Football Federation) Wydad AC
14	MF	Sadigatou Diallo	21 February 2003 (aged 22)	(Senegalese Football Federation) Aigles de la Médina
15	MF	Fatoumata Drame	28 March 2001 (aged 24)	(Senegalese Football Federation) Aigles de la Médina
16	GK	Tening Sene	21 January 1990 (aged 35)	(Senegalese Football Federation) Jappo Olympique
17	FW	Hapsatou Malado Diallo	14 April 2005 (aged 20)	(Turkish Football Federation) Galatasaray
18	DF	Meta Camara	14 August 1997 (aged 27)	(Turkish Football Federation) Trabzonspor
19	MF	Bineta Korkel Seck	11 January 1998 (aged 27)	(Senegalese Football Federation) Aigles de la Médina
20	MF	Korka Fall	19 February 1990 (aged 35)	(French Football Federation) Caen
21	FW	Ndèye Awa Casset	12 November 2003 (aged 21)	(Senegalese Football Federation) Aigles de la Médina
22	FW	Pascaline Fofana Bassène	22 December 2002 (aged 22)	(Royal Spanish Football Federation) Argual
23	GK	Adji Ndiaye	4 August 2006 (aged 18)	(Senegalese Football Federation) AS Bambey
24	DF	Meta Kandé	26 March 2002 (aged 23)	(Senegalese Football Federation) Aigles de la Médina

=== DR Congo ===
Head coach: (Cameroon) Hervé Happy

No.	Pos.	Player	Date of birth (age)	Club
1	GK	Djane Longo	21 December 2000 (aged 24)	(French Football Federation) Cannes
2	DF	Belange Vukulu	16 December 1997 (aged 27)	(Congolese Association Football Federation) TP Mazembe
3	DF	Aimeraude Mawanda	25 March 1998 (aged 27)	(Congolese Association Football Federation) TP Mazembe
4	DF	Kristal Iyombe	28 January 2006 (aged 19)	(French Football Federation) Monaco
5	DF	Éva Sumo	7 December 1993 (aged 31)	(French Football Federation) Nantes
6	FW	Bénie Kubiena	7 May 1999 (aged 26)	(Chinese Football Association) Shanghai RCB
7	FW	Naomie Kabakaba	4 April 1998 (aged 27)	(Saudi Arabian Football Federation) Al-Ahli
8	MF	Marlène Kasaj	25 January 1996 (aged 29)	(Congolese Association Football Federation) TP Mazembe
9	FW	Grâce Mfwamba	17 September 1998 (aged 26)	(Saudi Arabian Football Federation) Al-Taraji
10	FW	Falonne Pambani	2 June 1994 (aged 31)	(Saudi Arabian Football Federation) Al-Shabab
11	FW	Flavine Mawete	22 June 1997 (aged 28)	(Swedish Football Association) Djurgårdens IF
12	MF	Esther Siluvangi	8 February 2001 (aged 24)	(French Football Federation) Le Mans
13	MF	Ruth Bulala	8 April 2004 (aged 21)	(French Football Federation) AAS Sarcelles
14	FW	Anastasia Soulac	25 November 2003 (aged 21)	(French Football Federation) Nice
15	FW	Esther Dikisha	31 December 1998 (aged 26)	(Congolese Association Football Federation) FA Msichana
16	GK	Fideline Ngoy (captain)	31 March 1991 (aged 34)	(Congolese Association Football Federation) TP Mazembe
17	MF	Ruth Kipoyi	15 October 1997 (aged 27)	(Saudi Arabian Football Federation) Al-Nassr
18	FW	Olga Massombo	20 April 1999 (aged 26)	(Mexican Football Federation) Mazatlán
19	FW	Merveille Kanjinga	1 February 2003 (aged 22)	(French Football Federation) Paris Saint-Germain
20	DF	Wivine Kahambu	15 December 2005 (aged 19)	(Congolese Association Football Federation) TP Mazembe
21	GK	Ruth Khonde	10 October 1998 (aged 26)	(Congolese Football Federation) AC La Colombe
22	MF	Sarah Yasongamo	15 August 1998 (aged 26)	(Turkish Football Federation) Antalyaspor
23	FW	Deborah Ngalula	25 May 2002 (aged 23)	(French Football Federation) La Roche-sur-Yon
24	FW	Gloria Mabomba	19 March 1998 (aged 27)	(French Football Federation) Auxerre

== Group B ==
=== Nigeria ===
Head coach: Justine Madugu

Nigeria announced their 24-player squad on 20 June 2025.

No.	Pos.	Player	Date of birth (age)	Club
1	GK	Tochukwu Oluehi	2 May 1987 (aged 38)	(Saudi Arabian Football Federation) Eastern Flames
2	FW	Rinsola Babajide	17 June 1998 (aged 27)	(Royal Spanish Football Federation) Tenerife
3	DF	Osinachi Ohale	21 December 1991 (aged 33)	(Mexican Football Federation) Pachuca
4	DF	Shukurat Oladipo	22 September 2004 (aged 20)	(Italian Football Federation) Roma
5	DF	Ashleigh Plumptre	8 May 1998 (aged 27)	(Saudi Arabian Football Federation) Al-Ittihad
6	FW	Esther Okoronkwo	27 March 1997 (aged 28)	(Canadian Soccer Association) AFC Toronto
7	MF	Toni Payne	22 April 1995 (aged 30)	(The Football Association) Everton
8	FW	Asisat Oshoala	9 October 1994 (aged 30)	(United States Soccer Federation) Bay FC
9	FW	Ifeoma Onumonu	25 February 1994 (aged 31)	(French Football Federation) Montpellier
10	MF	Christy Ucheibe	25 December 2000 (aged 24)	(Portuguese Football Federation) Benfica
11	DF	Sikiratu Isah	10 July 1997 (aged 27)	(Nigeria Football Federation) Nasarawa Amazons
12	MF	Jennifer Echegini	22 March 2001 (aged 24)	(French Football Federation) Paris Saint-Germain
13	MF	Deborah Abiodun	2 November 2003 (aged 21)	(United States Soccer Federation) Dallas Trinity
14	DF	Oluwatosin Demehin	13 March 2002 (aged 23)	(Turkish Football Federation) Galatasaray
15	MF	Rasheedat Ajibade	8 December 1999 (aged 25)	(Royal Spanish Football Federation) Atlético Madrid
16	GK	Chiamaka Nnadozie	8 December 2000 (aged 24)	(French Football Federation) Paris FC
17	FW	Francisca Ordega	19 October 1993 (aged 31)	(Saudi Arabian Football Federation) Al-Ittihad
18	MF	Halimatu Ayinde	16 May 1995 (aged 30)	(Swedish Football Association) FC Rosengård
19	FW	Chinwendu Ihezuo	30 April 1997 (aged 28)	(Mexican Football Federation) Pachuca
20	FW	Folashade Ijamilusi	30 May 2001 (aged 24)	(Chinese Football Association) Liaoning Baiye
21	DF	Miracle Usani	20 June 2007 (aged 18)	(Nigeria Football Federation) Edo Queens
22	DF	Michelle Alozie	28 April 1997 (aged 28)	(United States Soccer Federation) Houston Dash
23	GK	Udoka Unachukwu	17 December 2005 (aged 19)	(Nigeria Football Federation) Nasarawa Amazons
24	FW	Chioma Okafor	20 March 2003 (aged 22)	(United States Soccer Federation) Connecticut Huskies

=== Tunisia ===
Head coach: Kamel Saada

Tunisia announced their 24-player squad on 12 June 2025.

No.	Pos.	Player	Date of birth (age)	Club
1	GK	Manelle Ben Mohamed	2 August 2003 (aged 21)	(French Football Federation) Cannes
2	FW	Nora Nouhaili	15 February 2003 (aged 22)	(Royal Moroccan Football Federation) RS Berkane
3	MF	Wided Mejri	28 February 2006 (aged 19)	(Tunisian Football Federation) ASF Bou Hajla
4	DF	Chaima Abbassi (Captain)	4 June 1993 (aged 32)	(Saudi Arabian Football Federation) NEOM
5	DF	Norhène Bettoumi	2 October 2005 (aged 19)	(French Football Federation) Saint-Malo
6	MF	Rania Aouina	5 May 1994 (aged 31)	(Saudi Arabian Football Federation) Al-Hmmah
7	FW	Sana Guermazi	3 November 2001 (aged 23)	(French Football Federation) Le Mans
8	MF	Ahlem Ammar	22 June 2004 (aged 21)	(German Football Association) VfL Wolfsburg
9	FW	Sabrine Ellouzi	28 June 1998 (aged 27)	(Royal Dutch Football Association) Excelsior
10	FW	Mariem Houij	8 August 1994 (aged 30)	(Saudi Arabian Football Federation) Abha
11	MF	Sabah Shaiek	1 June 2003 (aged 22)	(French Football Federation) Cannes
12	MF	Yosra Ben Hadj Mahmoud	9 March 2001 (aged 24)	(French Football Federation) Grenoble
13	MF	Sarah Ben Mbarek	15 April 2006 (aged 19)	(French Football Federation) Mulhouse
14	MF	Salma Marzouki	22 June 2006 (aged 19)	(Tunisian Football Federation) AS Banque de l'Habitat
15	DF	Ghada Ayadi	10 August 1992 (aged 32)	(Tunisian Football Federation) ASF Sousse
16	GK	Soulaima Jabrani	25 February 1997 (aged 28)	(Tunisian Football Federation) ASF Sousse
17	DF	Yesmin Khanchouch	18 February 2006 (aged 19)	(Royal Dutch Football Association) Telstar
18	DF	Samia Ouni	30 May 1992 (aged 33)	(Saudi Arabian Football Federation) Eastern Flames
19	MF	Chirine Lamti	13 September 1994 (aged 30)	(Italian Football Federation) Cesena
20	FW	Salma Zemzem	7 April 2000 (aged 25)	(French Football Federation) Thonon Évian
21	FW	Amani Ayed	28 December 2006 (aged 18)	(Swedish Football Association) AIK B
22	GK	Zohra Jelassi	11 April 2000 (aged 25)	(Royal Moroccan Football Federation) CJ Ben Guerir
23	DF	Myriam Bayahia	26 October 2002 (aged 22)	(French Football Federation) Auxerre
24	DF	Yasmine Khemila	18 December 2006 (aged 18)	

=== Algeria ===
Head coach: (France) Farid Benstiti

Algeria announced their 26-player squad on 24 June 2025.

No.	Pos.	Player	Date of birth (age)	Club
1	GK	Lamia Lounas	28 November 2000 (aged 24)	(Algerian Football Federation) ASE Alger Centre
2	DF	Mélinne D'Oria	7 August 2001 (aged 23)	(French Football Federation) Le Mans
3	DF	Sofia Guellati (captain)	9 July 1992 (aged 32)	(French Football Federation) Guingamp
4	DF	Roselène Khezami	2 September 2001 (aged 23)	(French Football Federation) Marseille
5	DF	Ouassila Alouache	11 July 2000 (aged 24)	(Algerian Football Federation) CF Akbou
6	MF	Mélissa Bethi	18 November 2005 (aged 19)	(French Football Federation) Nantes
7	DF	Morgane Belkhiter	23 November 1995 (aged 29)	(French Football Federation) Saint-Étienne
8	MF	Wissem Bouzid	18 December 2002 (aged 22)	(French Football Federation) Le Mans
9	FW	Laura Taleb Muller	9 January 1999 (aged 26)	(French Football Federation) Thonon Évian
10	MF	Ghoutia Karchouni	29 May 1995 (aged 30)	(Swiss Football Association) Servette
11	FW	Lina Boussaha	16 January 1999 (aged 26)	(Saudi Arabian Football Federation) Al Nassr
12	DF	Hanna Boubezari	21 November 1998 (aged 26)	(Swedish Football Association) Team TG FF
13	MF	Lina Khelif	27 January 1997 (aged 28)	(French Football Federation) Thonon Évian
14	FW	Inès Boutaleb	8 November 1998 (aged 26)	(French Football Federation) Metz
15	DF	Morgane Ikene	13 January 1999 (aged 26)	(French Football Federation) Saint-Malo
16	GK	Chloé N'Gazi	6 June 1996 (aged 29)	(French Football Federation) Marseille
17	DF	Inès Belloumou	21 June 2000 (aged 25)	(Swedish Football Association) Malmö FF
18	DF	Imane Chebel	25 May 1995 (aged 30)	(Canadian Soccer Association) CS Longueuil
19	FW	Naïma Bouhani	23 October 1985 (aged 39)	(Algerian Football Federation) Afak Relizane
20	MF	Amira Ould Braham	17 February 1998 (aged 27)	(French Football Federation) Nantes
21	FW	Marine Dafeur	20 October 1994 (aged 30)	(French Football Federation) Fleury
22	MF	Emma Smaali	29 September 2000 (aged 24)	(French Football Federation) Lens
23	GK	Amina Haleyi	10 September 1992 (aged 32)	(Algerian Football Federation) JS Kabylie
24	FW	Nouhed Naili	11 April 2001 (aged 24)	(French Football Federation) Cannes
25	DF	Léa Abadou	12 March 1997 (aged 28)	(French Football Federation) Orléans
26	FW	Aïcha Hamidèche	2 October 2001 (aged 23)	(United Arab Emirates Football Association) Abu Dhabi Country Club

=== Botswana ===
Head coach: Alex Malete

Botswana announced their 26-player squad on 17 June 2025.

No.	Pos.	Player	Date of birth (age)	Club
1	GK	Tlamelo Pheresi	30 November 1996 (aged 28)	(Botswana Football Association) Gaborone United
2	DF	Kesegofetse Mochawe	30 July 1995 (aged 29)	(Botswana Football Association) Gaborone United
3	MF	Nancy Baeletsi	21 March 1996 (aged 29)	(Botswana Football Association) Gaborone United
4	DF	Masego Montsho	15 June 1991 (aged 34)	(Botswana Football Association) Security Systems
5	MF	Leungo Senwelo	23 December 2001 (aged 23)	(Botswana Football Association) Mazotie
6	MF	Golebaone Selebatso	22 March 1991 (aged 34)	(Botswana Football Association) Gaborone United
7	FW	Refilwe Tholakele	26 January 1996 (aged 29)	(South African Football Association) Mamelodi Sundowns
8	DF	Lone Gaofetoge	16 July 2001 (aged 23)	(Turkish Football Federation) Hakkarigücü Spor
9	DF	Mokgabo Thanda	3 April 1993 (aged 32)	(Football Association of Zambia) Green Buffaloes
10	FW	Lesego Radiakanyo	27 June 1999 (aged 26)	(Botswana Football Association) Gaborone United
11	FW	Michelle Abueng	6 May 2001 (aged 24)	(Botswana Football Association) Botswana Defence Force
12	MF	Obonetse Rathari	11 November 2002 (aged 22)	(Botswana Football Association) Gaborone United
13	FW	Keitumetse Dithebe	17 July 2002 (aged 22)	(Turkish Football Federation) ABB Fomget
14	DF	Veronicah Mogotsi	21 August 1992 (aged 32)	(Botswana Football Association) Double Action
15	FW	Balotlhanyi Johannes	28 June 1994 (aged 31)	(Botswana Football Association) Double Action
16	GK	Sedilame Boseja	1 December 1997 (aged 27)	(South African Football Association) Mamelodi Sundowns
17	MF	Esalenna Galekhutle	23 January 2001 (aged 24)	(United States Soccer Federation) William Carey University
18	FW	Nondi Mahlasela	25 December 1991 (aged 33)	(Botswana Football Association) Prisons XI
19	MF	Laone Moloi	26 November 2000 (aged 24)	(Botswana Football Association) Double Action
20	FW	Gaonyadiwe Ontlametse	12 January 2000 (aged 25)	(Botswana Football Association) Gaborone United
21	MF	Tshegofatso Mosotho	19 June 2002 (aged 23)	(Botswana Football Association) Mazotie
22	DF	Boitumelo Gammu	23 July 1995 (aged 29)	(Namibia Football Association) Ongos
23	GK	Lesego Moeng	3 February 1998 (aged 27)	(South African Football Association) TS Galaxy
24	FW	Peggy Manewe	25 December 2004 (aged 20)	(Botswana Football Association) Double Action
25	FW	Yaone Modise	9 December 2005 (aged 19)	(Botswana Football Association) Gaborone United
26	FW	Jessica Maponga	24 February 2004 (aged 21)	(Botswana Football Association) Gaborone United

== Group C ==
=== South Africa ===
Head coach: Desiree Ellis

South Africa announced their 24-player squad on 23 June 2025. Nthabiseng Majiya and Casey Gordon were named as standby players and will train with the squad until the team's departure to Morocco.

No.	Pos.	Player	Date of birth (age)	Club
1	GK	Kaylin Swart	30 September 1994 (aged 30)	(South African Football Association) JVW
2	DF	Lebohang Ramalepe	3 December 1991 (aged 33)	(South African Football Association) Mamelodi Sundowns
3	MF	Bongeka Gamede	22 May 1999 (aged 26)	(Danish Football Association) Nordsjælland
4	MF	Regina Mogolola	17 April 1993 (aged 32)	(South African Football Association) JVW
5	DF	Fikile Magama	19 January 2002 (aged 23)	(South African Football Association) UWC
6	MF	Noxolo Cesane	11 October 2000 (aged 24)	(South African Football Association) Mamelodi Sundowns
7	DF	Karabo Dhlamini	18 September 2001 (aged 23)	(South African Football Association) Mamelodi Sundowns
8	FW	Hildah Magaia	16 December 1994 (aged 30)	(Mexican Football Federation) Tijuana
9	DF	Gabriela Salgado	20 February 1998 (aged 27)	(South African Football Association) JVW
10	MF	Linda Motlhalo	1 July 1998 (aged 27)	(Scottish Football Association) Glasgow City
11	FW	Kgalebane Mohlakoana	10 December 1993 (aged 31)	(Congolese Association Football Federation) TP Mazembe
12	FW	Jermaine Seoposenwe	12 October 1993 (aged 31)	(Mexican Football Federation) Monterrey
13	DF	Bambanani Mbane	12 March 1990 (aged 35)	(South African Football Association) Mamelodi Sundowns
14	MF	Nonhlanhla Mthandi	19 August 1995 (aged 29)	(South African Football Association) Mamelodi Sundowns
15	MF	Refiloe Jane	4 August 1992 (aged 32)	(South African Football Association) TS Galaxy
16	GK	Andile Dlamini	2 September 1992 (aged 32)	(South African Football Association) Mamelodi Sundowns
17	DF	Tiisetso Makhubela	24 April 1997 (aged 28)	(South African Football Association) Mamelodi Sundowns
18	MF	Sibulele Holweni	28 April 2001 (aged 24)	(South African Football Association) UWC
19	DF	Lonathemba Mhlongo	23 August 2002 (aged 22)	(South African Football Association) UWC
20	FW	Adrielle Mibe	26 January 2007 (aged 18)	(South African Football Association) University of Johannesburg
21	GK	Dineo Magagula	14 October 1994 (aged 30)	(South African Football Association) TS Galaxy
22	MF	Amogelang Motau	27 February 1997 (aged 28)	(Mexican Football Federation) Tijuana
23	FW	Ronnel Donnelly	31 March 2004 (aged 21)	(South African Football Association) UWC
24	FW	Bonolo Mokoma	30 April 2008 (aged 17)	(South African Football Association) JVW

=== Ghana ===
Head coach: (Sweden) Kim Björkegren

Ghana announced their 24-player squad on 30 June 2025.

No.	Pos.	Player	Date of birth (age)	Club
1	GK	Cynthia Konlan	29 November 2002 (aged 22)	(Malta Football Association) Swieqi United
2	DF	Ernestina Abambila	30 December 1998 (aged 26)	(Hungarian Football Federation) Győri ETO
3	DF	Susan Ama Duah	3 February 2002 (aged 23)	(Israel Football Association) Hapoel Katamon
4	DF	Nina Norshie	14 September 2001 (aged 23)	(United States Soccer Federation) Florida State Seminoles
5	MF	Grace Asantewaa	5 December 2000 (aged 24)	(Mexican Football Federation) Juárez
6	MF	Jennifer Cudjoe	7 March 1994 (aged 31)	(United States Soccer Federation) DC Power
7	FW	Princess Marfo	2 October 2003 (aged 21)	(United States Soccer Federation) Bay FC
8	MF	Chantelle Boye-Hlorkah	8 September 1995 (aged 29)	(The Football Association) London City Lionesses
9	FW	Doris Boaduwaa	24 December 2002 (aged 22)	(Israel Football Association) Hapoel Katamon
10	FW	Princella Adubea	27 December 1998 (aged 26)	(United Arab Emirates Football Association) Abu Dhabi Country Club
11	FW	Alice Kusi	12 January 1995 (aged 30)	(Saudi Arabian Football Federation) Al-Ahli
12	DF	Anasthesia Achiaa	20 December 2003 (aged 21)	(Israel Football Association) Hapoel Tel Aviv
13	MF	Evelyn Badu	11 September 2002 (aged 22)	(Norwegian Football Federation) Molde
14	MF	Stella Nyamekye	18 September 2005 (aged 19)	(United States Soccer Federation) Gotham FC
15	DF	Comfort Yeboah	17 December 2006 (aged 18)	(Ghana Football Association) Ampem Darkoa
16	GK	Kerrie McCarthy	22 October 2000 (aged 24)	(Ghana Football Association) Kumasi Sports
17	DF	Portia Boakye	17 April 1989 (aged 36)	(Israel Football Association) Hapoel Petah Tikva
18	DF	Louisa Aniwaa	4 April 2003 (aged 22)	(Portuguese Football Federation) Valadares Gaia
19	FW	Sherifatu Sumaila	30 November 1996 (aged 28)	(Saudi Arabian Football Federation) Al-Shabab
20	MF	Jacqueline Owusu	12 June 2002 (aged 23)	(Israel Football Association) Hapoel Tel Aviv
21	MF	Nancy Amoh	18 September 2005 (aged 19)	(Ghana Football Association) Ampem Darkoa
22	GK	Afi Amenyeku	15 November 2005 (aged 19)	(Ghana Football Association) Northern Ladies
23	DF	Josephine Bonsu	20 August 1999 (aged 25)	(German Football Association) Carl Zeiss Jena
24	FW	Wasiima Mohammed	22 March 2004 (aged 21)	(Ghana Football Association) Northern Ladies

=== Mali ===
Head coach: Mohamed Saloum Houssein

No.	Pos.	Player	Date of birth (age)	Club
1	GK	Fatoumata Karantao	8 November 1990 (aged 34)	(Malian Football Federation) USFAS Bamako
2	DF	Coulouba Sogoré	3 June 1997 (aged 28)	(French Football Federation) Auxerre
3	DF	Fatou Dembele	30 November 2000 (aged 24)	(Royal Spanish Football Federation) Tenerife
4	DF	Teninsoun Sissoko	2 September 1992 (aged 32)	(French Football Federation) Paris FC
6	MF	Coumba Dembele	25 October 2001 (aged 23)	(French Football Federation) Roubaix Wervicq
7	MF	Fatoumata Diarra	15 April 1986 (aged 39)	(Tanzania Football Federation) Tausi
8	MF	Yakaré Niakaté	12 January 1997 (aged 28)	(French Football Federation) Nice
9	FW	Oumou Kone	20 December 1999 (aged 25)	(Malian Football Federation) USFAS Bamako
10	FW	Agueissa Diarra	30 July 1998 (aged 26)	(French Football Federation) Paris Saint-Germain
11	MF	Salimata Diarra	24 October 1994 (aged 30)	(Royal Moroccan Football Federation) RS Berkane
12	FW	Hawa Traoré	23 September 2010 (aged 14)	(Malian Football Federation) Amazone CV
13	DF	Kani Konté	13 April 1989 (aged 36)	(French Football Federation) Issy
14	FW	Aïssata Traoré	9 September 1997 (aged 27)	(French Football Federation) Fleury
15	FW	Kadidiatou Diabate	5 February 2007 (aged 18)	(Malian Football Federation) AS Police
16	GK	Adoudou Konaté	14 April 1994 (aged 31)	(Royal Moroccan Football Federation) Ittihad Tanger
17	DF	Maimouna Traoré	31 December 1998 (aged 26)	(Malian Football Federation) AS Police
18	DF	Aicha Samake	13 September 1994 (aged 30)	(Royal Moroccan Football Federation) SC Casablanca
19	FW	Fatoumata Niakaté	22 December 2006 (aged 18)	(French Football Federation) Metz
20	MF	Saratou Traoré	27 September 2002 (aged 22)	(Chinese Football Association) Wuhan Jianghan
21	FW	Djenaba Baradji	16 December 1995 (aged 29)	(French Football Federation) Mantois
22	GK	Aïssata Bengaly	11 September 2000 (aged 24)	(Ivorian Football Federation) Athlético d'Abidjan

=== Tanzania ===
Head coach: Bakari Shime

No.	Pos.	Player	Date of birth (age)	Club
1	GK	Janeth Shija	5 November 2003 (aged 21)	(Tanzania Football Federation) Simba
2	DF	Anastazia Katunzi	29 January 1996 (aged 29)	(Tanzania Football Federation) JKT Queens
3	DF	Hasnath Ubamba	8 July 2006 (aged 18)	(Egyptian Football Association) Masar
4	DF	Lidya Kabambo	27 November 2008 (aged 16)	(Tanzania Football Federation) JKT Queens
5	MF	Maimuna Kaimu	28 August 1997 (aged 27)	(Egyptian Football Association) ZED
6	MF	Donisia Minja	9 August 1996 (aged 28)	(Tanzania Football Federation) JKT Queens
7	FW	Opah Clement (Captain)	14 February 2001 (aged 24)	(Mexican Football Federation) Juárez
8	FW	Stumai Athumani	25 August 1997 (aged 27)	(Tanzania Football Federation) JKT Queens
9	FW	Aisha Mnunka	26 July 2005 (aged 19)	(Tanzania Football Federation) Simba
10	FW	Jamila Mnunduka	10 November 2007 (aged 17)	(Tanzania Football Federation) JKT Queens
11	MF	Diana Msewa	13 November 2001 (aged 23)	(Turkish Football Federation) Trabzonspor
12	MF	Janeth Pangamwene	27 November 2008 (aged 16)	(Tanzania Football Federation) JKT Queens
13	MF	Asha Ramadhani	5 May 2009 (aged 16)	(Tanzania Football Federation) Yanga Princess
14	FW	Clara Luvanga	25 February 2005 (aged 20)	(Saudi Arabian Football Federation) Al-Nassr
15	DF	Julitha Singano	8 February 2001 (aged 24)	(Mexican Football Federation) Juárez
16	DF	Ester Maseke	3 June 2008 (aged 17)	(Tanzania Football Federation) Bunda Queens
17	MF	Enekia Lunyamila	20 April 2002 (aged 23)	(Mexican Football Federation) Mazatlán
18	GK	Najiati Idrisa	2 April 1997 (aged 28)	(Tanzania Football Federation) JKT Queens
19	FW	Winfrida Gerald	26 February 2002 (aged 23)	(Tanzania Football Federation) JKT Queens
20	GK	Asha Mrisho	10 February 2004 (aged 21)	(Tanzania Football Federation) Mashukaa Queens
21	DF	Violeth Nicholaus	9 February 2005 (aged 20)	(Tanzania Football Federation) Simba
22	MF	Christer Bahera	17 November 2005 (aged 19)	(Tanzania Football Federation) JKT Queens
23	DF	Fatuma Issa	6 April 1995 (aged 30)	(Tanzania Football Federation) Simba
24	MF	Elizabeth Chenge	25 July 2001 (aged 23)	(Tanzania Football Federation) JKT Queens
25	GK	Nsura Hamsi Jafari	20 December 2010 (aged 14)	(Tanzania Football Federation) Alliance Girls
