= Mélinne D'Oria =

Algerian footballer (born 2001)

Personal information
- Full name: Mélinne Jeanne Martine D'Oria
- Date of birth: 7 August 2001 (age 25)
- Place of birth: Drancy, France
- Position: Midfielder

Team information
- Current team: Le Mans
- Number: 11

Youth career
- 2016–2018: Paris Saint-Germain

Senior career*
Years	Team	Apps	(Gls)
2019–2022	VGA Saint-Maur	20	(0)
2023–2024	Nantes	15	(1)
2024–	Le Mans	19	(2)

International career^{‡}
2023–	Algeria	2	(0)
- * Club domestic league appearances and goals as of 17 May 2025 ‡ National team caps and goals as of 8 April 2024

Mélinne Jeanne Martine D'Oria (Arabic: ميلين جين مارتين دوريا; born 7 August 2001) is a professional footballer who plays as a midfielder for Seconde Ligue club Le Mans. Born in France, she plays for the Algeria national team.

== Club career ==
In July 2023, she departed from VGA Saint-Maur and signed with FC Nantes. One year later, after achieving promotion to Première Ligue, she left Nantes joining Le Mans.

== International career ==
In September 2023, D'Oria received her first call-up to the Algeria national team by coach Farid Benstiti to participate in a double confrontation against Uganda as part of the first round of the 2024 Women's Africa Cup of Nations qualification.

On 4 December 2023, she debuted for the team against Burundi, coming on for Marine Dafeur in the 82nd minute. It was in a 1–0 win that secured Algeria's qualification for the African Cup.

She was called again in February 2024 for a training camp at the National Technical Center of Sidi Moussa, as part of the preparation for the final tournament. On 24 February 2024, she came on as a substitute for the Algerians in a 2–0 win against Burkina Faso.

== Career statistics ==
=== Club ===
As of match played 3 November 2024

Appearances and goals by club, season and competition
Club	Season	League			Cup		Total	
Club	Season	Division	Apps	Goals	Apps	Goals	Apps	Goals
VGA Saint-Maur	2019–20	D2F	1	0	0	0	1	0
VGA Saint-Maur	2020–21	D2F	4	0	0	0	4	0
VGA Saint-Maur	2021–22	D2F	14	0	0	0	14	0
VGA Saint-Maur	Total		19	0	0	0	19	0
Nantes	2023–24	D2F	15	1	4	2	19	3
Nantes	Total		15	1	4	2	19	3
Le Mans	2024–25	Seconde Ligue	6	1	0	0	6	1
Le Mans	Total		6	1	0	0	6	1
Career total			40	2	4	2	44	4

=== International ===
As of match played 7 April 2024

Appearances and goals by national team and year
National team	Year	Apps	Goals
Algeria	2023	1	0
Algeria	2024	1	0
Total		2	0
