= 2024–25 Seconde Ligue =

37th season of 2nd-tier French women's football league

Seconde Ligue
- Season: 2024–25
- Dates: 15 September 2024 – 18 May 2025
- Champions: Marseille (2nd title)
- Relegated: US Orléans
- Matches played: 110
- Goals scored: 351 (3.19 per match)
- Top goalscorer: Aude Gbedjissi (15 goals)
- Biggest home win: Lens 7–1 Nice (29 September 2024)
- Biggest away win: Nice 0–6 Lille (6 October 2024)
- Highest scoring: Lens 7–1 Nice (29 September 2024)
- Highest attendance: 10,237; Lens 2–3 Metz (19 April 2025)
- Lowest attendance: 50; Nice 0–3 Lens (27 April 2025)
- Attendance: 62,907 (572 per match)

The 2024–25 Seconde Ligue season, was the 37th season of the second tier of national women's football league in France and the first season since its rebranding as Seconde Ligue.

The season began on 15 September 2024 and ended on 18 May 2025. Marseille claimed their second title after finishing first in the standings, edging out Main competitors RC Lens on head-to-head points.

== Teams ==
Location of teams in 2024–25 Seconde Ligue

Twelve teams were set to take part in this season, including eight teams retained from last season's lineup. They were joined by US Saint-Malo and Toulouse, promoted from Division 3 Féminine to replace relegated sides Albi Marssac and Montauban. Additionally, Lille and Bordeaux entered the league following their relegation from Division 1. In September 2024, the National Directorate of Management Control (DNCG) of the French Football Federation excluded the women's section of Girondins de Bordeaux from national divisions. Consequently, the team was relegated to the regional level.

| Team | Manager | Home ground | Capacity | 2023–24 season |
|---|---|---|---|---|
| Le Mans | Damien Bollini | Complexe de la Californie, Le Mans | 400 | 10th |
| Lens | Sarah M'Barek | Stade Degouve-Brabant, Arras | 2,800 | 5th |
| Lille | Yacine Guesmia | Stadium annexe 1, Villeneuve-d'Ascq | 650 | D1F, 12th (relegated) |
| Marseille | Frédéric Gonçalves | OM Campus, Marseille | 550 | 3rd |
| Metz | Marine Morel | Stade Dezavelle, Metz | 1,500 | 9th |
| Nice | Matthieu Esposito | Stade de la Plaine du Var, Nice | 1,000 | 4th |
| Orléans | Mathias Bastos; Régis Mohar | Stade de la Source, Orléans | 7,500 | 7th |
| Rodez | Karima Benameur Taieb | Stade de Vabre, Rodez | 400 | 6th |
| Saint-Malo | Roland Jamelot | Stade de Marville, Saint-Malo | 2,500 | D3F A, 1st (promoted) |
| Thonon Evian | Wahid Chaouki | Stade Camille-Fournier, Évian-les-Bains | 1,500 | 8th |
| Toulouse | Antoine Gérard | Stadium de Toulouse annexe 1, Toulouse | 1,500 | D3F B, 1st (promoted) |

=== Team changes ===
| Entering league | | Exiting league | |
| Promoted from 2023–24 Division 3 | Relegated from 2023–24 Division 1 | Promoted to 2024–25 Première Ligue | Relegated to 2024–25 Division 3 Féminine |
|---|---|---|---|
| Saint-Malo; Toulouse | Bordeaux; Lille | Nantes; Strasbourg | Albi Marssac; Montauban |

== Season ==
=== Standings ===
| Pos | Team | Pld | W | D | L | GF | GA | GD | Pts | Qualification or relegation |
|---|---|---|---|---|---|---|---|---|---|---|
| 1 | Marseille | 20 | 14 | 3 | 3 | 46 | 22 | +24 | 45 (Note: Olympique de Marseille finished ahead of RC Lens on head-to-head points: Marseille 4, Lens 1; Lens 2–2 Marseille, Marseille 1–0 Lens.) | Promotion to 2025–26 Première Ligue |
| 2 | Lens | 20 | 14 | 3 | 3 | 54 | 23 | +31 | 45 | Promotion to 2025–26 Première Ligue |
| 3 | Toulouse | 20 | 11 | 4 | 5 | 36 | 24 | +12 | 37 | |
| 4 | Le Mans | 20 | 9 | 4 | 7 | 29 | 24 | +5 | 31 | |
| 5 | Saint-Malo | 20 | 7 | 6 | 7 | 30 | 33 | −3 | 27 | |
| 6 | Metz | 20 | 6 | 7 | 7 | 26 | 25 | +1 | 25 | |
| 7 | Lille | 20 | 7 | 3 | 10 | 38 | 35 | +3 | 24 | |
| 8 | Thonon Evian | 20 | 5 | 7 | 8 | 20 | 34 | −14 | 22 | |
| 9 | Nice | 20 | 5 | 3 | 12 | 21 | 51 | −30 | 18 | |
| 10 | Rodez | 20 | 4 | 5 | 11 | 26 | 43 | −17 | 17 | |
| 11 | Orléans | 20 | 5 | 1 | 14 | 25 | 37 | −12 | 16 | Relegation to 2025–26 Division 3 Féminine |

Source: FFF.fr
Rules for classification: 1) points; 2) head-to-head points; 3) head-to-head goal difference; 4) goal difference; 5) goals scored

=== Results ===
| Home \ Away | OMS | LEN | TOU | MAN | SML | MTZ | LIL | THN | NIC | RDZ | ORL |
|---|---|---|---|---|---|---|---|---|---|---|---|
| Marseille | — | 1–0 | 3–1 | 1–0 | 6–0 | 2–1 | 4–3 | 5–0 | 3–1 | 1–3 | 2–1 |
| Lens | 2–2 | — | 0–1 | 4–1 | 3–2 | 2–3 | 2–1 | 1–1 | 7–1 | 3–1 | 3–1 |
| Toulouse | 1–1 | 2–3 | — | 3–0 | 1–1 | 1–0 | 2–2 | 0–1 | 5–2 | 2–1 | 1–0 |
| Le Mans | 3–4 | 0–1 | 2–0 | — | 4–1 | 2–1 | 2–0 | 2–0 | 1–0 | 1–1 | 3–1 |
| Saint-Malo | 1–3 | 2–4 | 1–1 | 2–1 | — | 3–0 | 2–0 | 2–2 | 1–2 | 1–0 | 2–1 |
| Metz | 2–0 | 0–0 | 0–3 | 1–1 | 2–0 | — | 2–4 | 0–0 | 1–1 | 4–1 | 4–1 |
| Lille | 0–1 | 0–3 | 3–5 | 1–1 | 1–1 | 1–0 | — | 1–2 | 4–1 | 2–3 | 6–1 |
| Thonon Evian | 1–1 | 0–6 | 1–3 | 0–0 | 1–1 | 0–2 | 2–0 | — | 0–1 | 3–1 | 2–0 |
| Nice | 1–0 | 0–3 | 0–2 | 3–2 | 1–5 | 1–1 | 0–6 | 3–1 | — | 1–3 | 0–2 |
| Rodez | 1–4 | 2–4 | 0–2 | 0–2 | 0–0 | 2–2 | 0–1 | 2–2 | 2–2 | — | 0–4 |
| Orléans | 0–2 | 2–3 | 3–0 | 0–1 | 0–2 | 0–0 | 1–2 | 3–1 | 2–0 | 2–3 | — |

Source: FFF.fr
Legend: Blue = home team win; Yellow = draw; Red = away team win.

== Season statistics ==
=== Top scorers ===
| Rank | Player | Club | Goals |
|---|---|---|---|
| 1 | (Benin) Aude Gbedjissi | Lens | 15 |
| 2 | (Turkey) Selen Altunkulak | Toulouse | 13 |
| 3 | (France) Namnata Traoré | Orléans | 12 |
| 4 | (Senegal) Mama Diop | Marseille | 10 |
| 5 | (France) Marie-Charlotte Léger | Marseille | 9 |
| 6 | (France) Louann Archier | Lens | 8 |
| 7 | (France) Justine Rougemont | Metz | 7 |
| 7 | (Martinique) Maëva Salomon | Le Mans | 7 |
| 7 | (France) Ananée Yeboah | Saint-Malo | 7 |
| 10 | (France) Naomie Bamenga | Lille | 6 |
| 10 | (France) Louna Lapassouse | Toulouse | 6 |
| 10 | (Senegal) Seynabou Mbengue | Metz | 6 |
| 10 | (France) Alizée Mereau | Lens | 6 |
| 10 | (France) Carla Polito | Lens | 6 |
| 10 | (France) Fany Proniez | Lens | 6 |
| 10 | (France) Dona Scannapieco | Marseille | 6 |

=== Top assists ===
| Rank | Player | Club | Assists |
|---|---|---|---|
| 1 | (Benin) Aude Gbedjissi | Lens | 7 |
| 1 | (France) Laurine Pinot | Lens | 7 |
| 1 | (France) Jenny Perret | Marseille | 7 |
| 4 | (Turkey) Selen Altunkulak | Toulouse | 6 |
| 4 | (France) Fany Proniez | Lens | 6 |
| 6 | (France) Julie Pian | Lille | 5 |
| 6 | (France) Laura Bourgoin | Marseille | 5 |
| 6 | (France) Tatiana Solanet | Toulouse | 5 |
| 6 | (France) Sophie Vaysse | Rodez | 5 |
| 10 | (Tunisia) Salma Zemzem | Thonon Évian | 4 |
| 10 | (Algeria) Emma Smaali | Lens | 4 |
| 10 | (Ukraine) Inna Hlushchenko | Lille | 4 |

=== Most clean sheets ===
As of 27 April 2025

| Rank | Player | Club | Clean sheets |
|---|---|---|---|
| 1 | (France) Jade Dumas | Le Mans | 7 |
| 2 | (France) Audrey Dupupet | Orléans | 5 |
| 2 | (France) Julie Genty | Metz | 5 |
| 2 | (France) Gaëlle Grillon | Toulouse | 5 |
| 2 | (France) Blandine Joly | Lens | 5 |
| 6 | (France) Éva Danjou | Thonon Évian | 4 |
| 6 | (Algeria) Chloé N'Gazi | Marseille | 4 |
| 8 | (Canada) Taylor Beitz | Lille | 3 |
| 8 | (France) Louise Thiery | Saint Malo | 3 |
| 10 | (France) Gaëlle Grillon | Toulouse | 2 |
| 10 | (France) Maureen Saint-Léger | Nice | 2 |
| 10 | (France) Charlotte Verdier | Marseille | 2 |

=== Hat-tricks ===
| Player | Club | Against | Result | Date |
|---|---|---|---|---|
| (Benin) Aude Gbedjissi | Lens | Nice | 7–1 (H) | 29 September 2024 |
| (France) Louna Lapassouse | Toulouse | Nice | 5–2 (H) | 10 November 2024 |
| (France) Fany Proniez | Lens | Thonon Évian | 6–0 (A) | 19 January 2025 |
| (Senegal) Mama Diop^{4} | Marseille | Rodez | 4–1 (A) | 16 March 2025 |
| (Turkey) Selen Altunkulak^{4} | Toulouse | Lille | 5–3 (A) | 27 April 2025 |

== Awards ==
=== Player of the Month ===
| Month | Winner | Club |
|---|---|---|
| September 2024 | (Martinique) Maëva Salomon | Le Mans |
| October 2024 | (Martinique) Maëva Salomon | Le Mans |
| November 2024 | (Tunisia) Sana Guermazi | Le Mans |

== See also ==
- Coupe de France féminine
- 2024–25 Première Ligue
