= Inès Khiri =

Algerian footballer (born 1999)

Personal information
- Date of birth: 28 March 1999 (age 27)
- Place of birth: Mulhouse, France
- Height: 1.69 m (5 ft 7 in)
- Position: Forward

Team information
- Current team: Yverdon Sport
- Number: 9

Senior career*
Years	Team	Apps	(Gls)
2022–2024	FC Mulhouse		
2024–2025	Lausanne-Sport		
2025	Grenoble Foot 38	13	(4)
2025–	Yverdon Sport	22	(27)

International career
2025–	Algeria	6	(2)
- * Club domestic league appearances and goals

Inès Khiri (Arabic: إيناس خيري; born 28 March 1999) is a professional footballer who plays as a forward for Swiss Nationalliga B side FC Yverdon Féminin. Born in France, she plays for the Algeria national football team.

== Early life ==
Born in Mulhouse, France, Khiri is of Algerian descent and traces her family origins to Sétif, Algeria. She began playing football at the age of five, taking part in matches in her neighbourhood with her older brother Kamal, at school, and with local clubs. She has described football as a passion from an early age and has said that it quickly became an important part of her life.

== Club career ==
Khiri began playing football in her hometown of Mulhouse, Alsace, where she joined FC Mulhouse and progressed through the club's youth academy from the youngest age groups to the under-15 team. Throughout her youth career, she primarily played as a centre-forward.

After completing her youth development, Khiri played for several clubs before moving abroad. She joined Swiss side Lausanne-Sport, before signing for Turkish club Beylerbeyi, where she competed in the Turkish Women's Football Super League. She later returned to France and signed for Grenoble Foot 38 (GF38). She made her competitive debut for the club against the reserve team of Olympique Lyonnais Féminin.

In June 2025, the Swiss Nationalliga B club FC Yverdon Féminin announced the signing of Khiri for the 2025–26 season.

== International career ==
In October 2025, she was called up to the Algeria national team for the first time by head coach Farid Benstiti, replacing the injured Morgane Ikene ahead of the two-legged 2026 Women's Africa Cup of Nations qualifiers against Cameroon.

Having received her first call-up the previous month, Khiri was retained in the Algeria squad for two friendly matches against Kenya in November 2025. She made her senior international debut on 26 November in a 2–1 win against the Harambee Starlets in Blida.

In February 2026, Khiri scored her maiden international goal in a 3–0 friendly win over Egypt on 28 February. She followed it up with another goal in the second friendly against the hosts on 2 March.

=== International goals ===
List of international goals scored by Inès Khiri:

No.	Date	Venue	Cap	Opponent	Score	Result	Competition
1.	28 February 2026	Cairo, Egypt	3	Egypt	2–0	3–0	Friendly
2.	2 March 2026	Cairo, Egypt	4	Egypt	3–2	3–2	Friendly
