= Ikram Adjabi =

Algerian footballer (born 1998)

Personal information
- Date of birth: 23 May 1998 (age 28)
- Place of birth: Beni Messous, Algiers, Algeria
- Height: 1.68 m (5 ft 6 in)
- Position: Forward

Team information
- Current team: Le Havre
- Number: 9

Senior career*
| Years | Team | Apps | (Gls) |
| 2014–2016 | Tremblay FC | 7 | (2) |
| 2016–2018 | Juvisy Essonne/Paris FC | 0 | (0) |
| 2018–2020 | Le Havre | 40 | (5) |
| 2020–2022 | US Orléans | 29 | (14) |
| 2022–2023 | GPSO 92 Issy | 20 | (10) |
| 2024– | Le Havre | 1 | (0) |

International career^{‡}
| 2020– | Algeria | 2 | (1) |
- * Club domestic league appearances and goals as of 2 October 2024 ‡ National team caps and goals as of 2 October 2024

Ikram Adjabi (Arabic: إكرام عجابي; born 23 May 1998) is an Algerian professional footballer who plays as a forward for Première Ligue club Le Havre and the Algeria national team.

== Club career ==
Born in Algiers, Adjabi began playing football with Tremblay FC.

In 2018, while playing for the reserve team of Paris FC, a member of Le Havre AC invited Adjabi for a trial, which led to her signing with the club. After two seasons at the club, she joined Orléans.

Two seasons later, she joined GPSO 92 Issy in Division 2 Féminine.

In September 2024, after being without a club since her pregnancy, she returned to Le Havre AC in Première Ligue.

== International career ==
Adjabi received her first call-up to the Algeria women's national football team in March 2020, to take part in a preparatory camp ahead of the 2020 Women's Africa Cup of Nations qualification.

In 2021, despite being called up but not capped for the first-leg match against Sudan and with the second leg being canceled, Adjabi finally made her debut in November 2021 during friendly matches against Tunisia. She started in a 1–0 win over the hosts and went on to score her first international goal in a 4–2 victory in the second game.

== Career statistics ==
=== Club ===
As of match played 29 September 2024

Appearances and goals by club, season and competition
| Club | Season | League | | | Cup | | Continental | | Other | | Total | |
| Club | Season | Division | Apps | Goals | Apps | Goals | Apps | Goals | Apps | Goals | Apps | Goals |
|---|---|---|---|---|---|---|---|---|---|---|---|---|
| Tremblay FC | 2014–15 | Division 2 | 3 | 0 | — | | — | | — | | 3 | 0 |
| Tremblay FC | 2015–16 | Division 2 | 4 | 2 | — | | — | | — | | 4 | 2 |
| Tremblay FC | Total | | 7 | 2 | — | | — | | — | | 7 | 2 |
| Le Havre | 2018–19 | Division 2 | 20 | 2 | 2 | 0 | — | | — | | 22 | 2 |
| Le Havre | 2019–20 | Division 2 | 16 | 2 | 2 | 1 | — | | — | | 18 | 3 |
| Le Havre | 2024–25 | Première Ligue | 1 | 0 | — | | — | | — | | 1 | 0 |
| Le Havre | Total | | 37 | 4 | 4 | 1 | — | | — | | 41 | 5 |
| US Orléans | 2020–21 | Division 2 | 6 | 6 | — | | — | | — | | 6 | 6 |
| US Orléans | 2021–22 | Division 2 | 20 | 6 | 3 | 2 | — | | — | | 23 | 8 |
| US Orléans | Total | | 26 | 12 | 3 | 2 | — | | — | | 29 | 14 |
| GPSO 92 Issy | 2022–23 | Division 2 | 19 | 10 | 1 | 0 | — | | — | | 20 | 10 |
| GPSO 92 Issy | Total | | 19 | 10 | 1 | 0 | — | | — | | 20 | 10 |
| Career total | | | 89 | 28 | 8 | 3 | — | | — | | 97 | 31 |

=== International ===
As of match played 29 October 2025

Appearances and goals by national team and year
| National team | Year | Apps | Goals |
|---|---|---|---|
| Algeria | 2021 | 2 | 1 |
| Algeria | 2025 | 2 | 0 |
| Total | | 4 | 1 |

Scores and results list Algeria's goal tally first, score column indicates score after each Adjabi goal.

List of international goals scored by Ikram Adjabi
| No. | Date | Venue | Opponent | Score | Result | Competition |
|---|---|---|---|---|---|---|
| 1 | 28 November 2021 | Stade Municipal d'Ariana, Ariana, Tunisia | Tunisia | 4–2 | 4–2 | International friendly |
