= Wissem Bouzid =

Algerian footballer (born 2002)

Personal information
- Date of birth: 18 December 2002 (age 23)
- Place of birth: Bagnolet, France
- Positions: Midfielder; forward

Team information
- Current team: Le Mans
- Number: 93

Youth career
- 2017–2021: Paris Saint-Germain

Senior career*
| Years | Team | Apps | (Gls) |
| 2021–2023 | Orléans | 24 | (2) |
| 2023– | Le Mans | 26 | (0) |

International career^{‡}
| 2021– | Algeria | 3 | (2) |
- * Club domestic league appearances and goals as of 20 October 2024 ‡ National team caps and goals as of 18 February 2023

Wissem Bouzid (Arabic: وسام بوزيد; born 18 December 2002) is a professional footballer who plays as a midfielder for Seconde Ligue club Le Mans. Born in France, she operates as a forward for the Algeria national team.

== Club career ==
Bouzid started playing football for the youth teams of Paris Saint-Germain before joining Orléans in 2021.

== International career ==
In October 2021, she was called up for the Algerian team for the first time by national coach Radia Fertoul, to participate in a double confrontation against Sudan, as part of the 2022 Women's Africa Cup of Nations qualification. On October 20, 2021, she marked her first cap as a starter and scored a brace in the historic 14–0 win over Sudan. The return match scheduled for October 26 was canceled following the October–November 2021 Sudanese coup d'état.

== Career statistics ==
=== Club ===
As of match played 20 January 2023

Appearances and goals by club, season and competition
| Club | Season | League | | | Cup | | Continental | | Other | | Total | |
| Club | Season | Division | Apps | Goals | Apps | Goals | Apps | Goals | Apps | Goals | Apps | Goals |
|---|---|---|---|---|---|---|---|---|---|---|---|---|
| US Orleans | 2021–22 | D2F | 5 | 1 | 1 | 0 | – | – | — | | 6 | 1 |
| US Orleans | 2022–23 | D2F | 8 | 0 | 1 | 0 | – | – | — | | 9 | 0 |
| Career total | | | 13 | 1 | 2 | 0 | – | – | — | | 15 | 1 |

As of match played 18 February 2023

Appearances and goals by national team and year
| National team | Year | Apps | Goals |
|---|---|---|---|
| Algeria | 2021 | 1 | 2 |
| Algeria | 2022 | 2 | 0 |
| Algeria | 2023 | 0 | 0 |
| Total | | 3 | 2 |

Scores and results list Algeria's goal tally first, score column indicates score after each Bouzid goal.

List of international goals scored by Wissem Bouzid
| No. | Date | Venue | Opponent | Score | Result | Competition |
|---|---|---|---|---|---|---|
| 1 | 20 October 2021 | Omar Hamadi Stadium, Algiers, Algeria | Sudan | 5–0 | 14–0 | 2022 Africa Women Cup of Nations qualification |
| 2 | 20 October 2021 | Omar Hamadi Stadium, Algiers, Algeria | Sudan | 6–0 | 14–0 | 2022 Africa Women Cup of Nations qualification |
