= Nassiba Laghouati =

Algerian football player and manager (born 1976)

Personal information
- Date of birth: 23 January 1976 (age 50)
- Place of birth: Algiers, Algeria
- Height: 1.67 m (5 ft 6 in)
- Position: Midfielder

Senior career*
Years	Team	Apps	(Gls)
1997–2006	Alger Centre		
2013	Affak Relizane		

International career^{‡}
2006	Algeria	2	(0)

Managerial career
- 2013: Affak Relizane
- * Club domestic league appearances and goals ‡ National team caps and goals as of 3 November 2006.

Nassiba Laghouati (Arabic: نسيبة لغواتي; born 23 January 1976) is an Algerian football former player and current manager. She played as a midfielder and has been a member of the Algeria women's national team.

== Club career ==
Laghouati has played for ASE Alger Centre and Affak Relizane in Algeria. She has been player-coach in the latter.

== International career ==
Laghouati capped for Algeria at senior level during the 2006 African Women's Championship.
