= Sofia Guellati =

Algerian footballer (born 1992)

Personal information
- Full name: Sofia Sarah Guellati
- Date of birth: 9 July 1992 (age 34)
- Place of birth: Draguignan, France
- Height: 1.65 m (5 ft 5 in)
- Position: Centre-back

Team information
- Current team: Guingamp
- Number: 19

Senior career*
Years	Team	Apps	(Gls)
2008–2015	Aurillac Arpajon	151	(44)
2015–2024	Rodez	144	(14)
2024–	Guingamp	16	(2)

International career
2016–	Algeria	26	(3)
- * Club domestic league appearances and goals

Sofia Sarah Guellati (Arabic: صوفيا غيلاتي; born 9 July 1992) is a professional footballer who plays as a centre-back for Première Ligue club EA Guingamp. Born in France, she represents and captains the Algeria women's national team.

== Early life ==
Guellati was born in Draguignan, Var, to an Algerian father from El Taref in the northeast of Algeria and a French mother. She begins playing football at the age of six in the Draguignan club, alongside boys.

== Club career ==
At the age of thirteen, Guellati joined a women's team in Trans-en-Provence. After a series of trials in Montpellier, she joined Étoile Sportive Arpajonnaise in Division 3 in the first year and then in Division 2 for the next six years. In 2015, she signed with Rodez Aveyron Football in Division 1.

After four seasons in Division 1 with Rodez, she got related to Division 2 with the club in 2019. Her team regained the top tier after winning the Division 2 championship Group B at the end of the 2021–2022 season.

On February 12, 2023, against ASJ Soyaux, Sofia played her 100th league match with Rodez.

In July 2024, she signed with Première Ligue club EA Guingamp following nine seasons with Rodez.

== International career ==
In February 2016, Guellati received her first call-up to the Algeria national team by the head coach, Azzedine Chih, to participate in a friendly double-header against Mali as part of the preparations for the WAFCON 2016 qualifications. On 2 February 2016, she made her debut as a starter against Mali, scoring a goal in the match.

In October 2021, she was part of the squad called up for two matches against Sudan in the 2022 Women's Africa Cup of Nations qualification. On October 20, 2021, she started in the historic 14–0 victory against Sudan.

Since Farid Benstiti took charge; Guellati captained Les Vertes. In April 2023, she was called up for a friendly double-header against Tanzania. On 9 April 2023, she started in the match against Tanzania at Nelson Mandela Stadium, and the Algerian team won 4–0. Then, on 11 April 2023, the captain scored the third goal for her team in a 3–0 victory over Tanzania.

== Career statistics ==
Club	Season	League			Cup		Continental		Other		Total	
Club	Season	Division	Apps	Goals	Apps	Goals	Apps	Goals	Apps	Goals	Apps	Goals
ES Arpajon	2008–09	Division 3 Féminine	15	5	2	0	—		—		17	5
ES Arpajon	2009–10	Division 2 Féminine	22	4	3	0	—		—		25	4
ES Arpajon	2010–11	Division 2 Féminine	21	4	2	1	—		—		23	5
ES Arpajon	2011–12	Division 2 Féminine	20	10	2	0	—		—		22	10
ES Arpajon	2012–13	Division 2 Féminine	22	11	–	–	—		—		22	11
Aurillac Arpajon	2013–14	Division 2 Féminine	20	5	–	–	—		—		20	5
Aurillac Arpajon	2014–15	Division 2 Féminine	21	4	1	0	—		—		22	4
Total			141	43	10	1	—		—		151	44
Rodez	2015–16	Division 1 Féminine	16	1	3	0	—		—		19	1
Rodez	2016–17	Division 1 Féminine	9	0	1	0	—		—		10	0
Rodez	2017–18	Division 1 Féminine	2	0	2	0	—		—		4	0
Rodez	2018–19	Division 1 Féminine	20	0	1	0	—		—		21	0
Rodez	2019–20	Division 2 Féminine	16	8	4	0	—		—		20	8
Rodez	2020–21	Division 2 Féminine	6	1	–	–	—		—		6	1
Rodez	2021–22	Division 2 Féminine	17	3	5	0	—		—		22	3
Rodez	2022–23	Division 1 Féminine	22	1	1	0	—		—		23	1
Rodez	2023–24	Division 2 Féminine	17	0	1	0	—		—		18	0
Total			125	14	18	0	—		—		143	14
Career total			266	57	28	1	—		—		294	58

=== International ===
As of match played 5 December 2023

Appearances and goals by national team and year
National team	Year	Apps	Goals
Algeria	2016	5	1
Algeria	2021	2	0
Algeria	2022	2	0
Algeria	2023	8	1
Total		17	2

==== International goals ====
#	Date	Venue	Opponent	Score	Result	Competition
1	2 February 2016	Baraki Stadium, Algiers, Algeria	Mali	2–1	2–2	Friendly
2	11 April 2023	Nelson Mandela Stadium, Algiers, Algeria	Tanzania	3–0	3–0	Friendly
3	27 February 2024	Nelson Mandela Stadium, Algiers, Algeria	Burkina Faso	2–0	3–0	Friendly
4	19 July 2026	Mustapha Tchaker Stadium, Blida, Algeria	Zambia	1–1	1–1	Friendly

== Honours ==
Rodez

- Division 2 Féminine: 2021–22
