= Nihed Naili =

Algerian footballer (born 2001)

Personal information
- Full name: Nouhed Naïli
- Date of birth: 11 April 2001 (age 25)
- Place of birth: Guelma, Algeria
- Position: Striker

Team information
- Current team: Nice
- Number: 24

Youth career
- 2018–2019: ES Genas Azieu
- 2019–2022: Lyon

Senior career*
Years	Team	Apps	(Gls)
2022–2023	Brest	13	(3)
2023–	Nice	21	(4)

International career^{‡}
2021–	Algeria	24	(3)
- * Club domestic league appearances and goals as of 26 May 2024 ‡ National team caps and goals as of 9 October 2026

Nouhed Naïli (Arabic: نهاد نايلي; born 11 April 2001) is an Algerian professional footballer who plays as a striker for Seconde Ligue club Nice and the Algeria national team. She is an Olympique Lyonnais youth academy graduate.

== Early life ==
Naïli was born in Guelma, Algeria, into a sports-oriented family. Her father, Skander, is a former player for ES Guelma and US Tébessa, as well as a former junior international during the 1980s. Even her uncle, Abdelkader, known as Kadour, was part of the famous ES Guelma team in the 1960s.

== Club career ==
Naïli started her youth career with ES Genas Azieu in 2018. She joined Olympique Lyonnais Academy in 2019. where she played for youth teams as a striker for four years. In her last match with the reserve team, she scored a hat-trick, helping them win the Ligue Auvergne-Rhône-Alpes Football Cup against Clermont Foot 63.

She signed her first professional with Division 2 Féminine club Stade Brestois 29. After playing 14 matches and scoring three goals, Nihed subsequently joined OGC Nice in September 2023.

== International career ==
In November 2021, Naili got her first call-up to the Algerian national team by coach Radia Fertoul to play two friendly matches against Tunisia, as a part of the preparation for the 2022 Women's Africa Cup of Nations qualification. Naili made her senior team debut on 28 November 2021 in a 4–2 friendly win over Tunisia.

== Career statistics ==
=== Club ===
As of match played 17 December 2023

Appearances and goals by club, season and competition
Club	Season	League			Cup		Continental		Other		Total	
Club	Season	Division	Apps	Goals	Apps	Goals	Apps	Goals	Apps	Goals	Apps	Goals
Stade brestois 29	2022–23	Division 2 Féminine	13	3	1	0	—		—		14	3
Stade brestois 29	Total		13	3	1	0	—		—		14	3
Nice	2023–24	Division 2 Féminine	8	3	–	–	—		—		8	3
Nice	Total		8	3	–	–	—		—		8	3
Career total			21	6	1	0	—		—		22	6

=== International ===
As of match played 9 October 2026

Appearances and goals by national team and year
National team	Year	Apps	Goals
Algeria	2021	1	0
Algeria	2023	3	0
Algeria	2024	4	0
Algeria	2025	8	0
Algeria	2026	8	3
Total		24	3

List of international goals scored by Nihed Naili
No.	Date	Venue	Opponent	Score	Result	Competition
1.	28 February 2026	EFA Center, Cairo, Egypt	Egypt	3–0	3–0	Friendly
2.	22 July 2026	Mustapha Tchaker Stadium, Blida, Algeria	Zambia	1–0	1–0	Friendly
3.	9 October 2026	Hocine Aït Ahmed Stadium, Tizi Ouzou, Algeria	Central African Republic	5–0	8–0	2028 CAF Women's Olympic qualifying tournament
