= Inès Boutaleb =

Algerian footballer (born 1998)

Personal information
- Date of birth: 8 November 1998 (age 27)
- Place of birth: Vénissieux, France
- Height: 1.71 m (5 ft 7 in)
- Position: Forward

Team information
- Current team: Metz
- Number: 14

Senior career*
Years	Team	Apps	(Gls)
2015–2016	Lyon	1	(0)
2016–2017	Marseille	7	(0)
2017–2018	Grenoble	13	(4)
2018–2019	Ambilly	21	(4)
2019–2021	Thonon Évian	17	(3)
2021–	Metz	56	(9)

International career^{‡}
2014–2015	France U17	11	(2)
2016	France U19	3	(1)
2018	France U20	1	(0)
2018–	Algeria	21	(5)
- * Club domestic league appearances and goals as of 20 October 2024 ‡ National team caps and goals as of 30 November 2023

Inès Boutaleb (Arabic: إيناس بوطالب; born 8 November 1998) is a professional footballer who plays as a forward for Seconde Ligue club Metz. Born in France, she played for its youth teams and now plays for the Algeria national team.

== Club career ==
at 8 years old, Inès Boutaleb began playing football with the boys. She later joined the Olympique Lyonnais training center, where she spent seven years. She first appeared in D1 Féminine during the 2015–2016 season at 17 years old.

In July 2017, after two seasons in the elite division, She joined Grenoble Foot in Division 2 Féminine.

In June 2018, the 20-year-old international signed with Croix de Savoie Ambilly in the same Division.

In June 2021, after four seasons with Thonon Évians, she moved to fellow D2 side Metz. On 15 June 2022, Metz announced the renewal of her contract.

== International career ==
Born in France, Boutaleb represented France's youth teams from the Under-17 to the Under-20 category, featuring in Les Bleuettes's squad for the 2015 UEFA Women's Under-17 Championship, where they reached the semi-finals.

Having last appeared in the tricolor jersey in March 2018 during a match against the United States, she switched her national allegiance to Algeria later that year. In November 2018, she was selected by coach Radia Fertoul for Algeria's senior team squad at the 2018 Women's Africa Cup of Nations in Ghana. On 9 November 2018, she made her debut in a 1–2 friendly loss to Ivory Coast. During the tournament, she featured in all three group-stage matches as Algeria was eliminated.

On 11 April 2023, she scored her first international goal for Les Vertes in a 3–0 win against Tanzania. Later that November, she netted her first competitive goal, scoring a hat-trick in a 5–1 victory over Burundi.

== Career statistics ==
=== International ===
As of match played 30 November 2024

Appearances and goals by national team and year
National team	Year	Apps	Goals
Algeria	2018	4	0
Algeria	2019	4	0
Algeria	2023	8	5
Algeria	2024	5	0
Total		21	5

Scores and results list Algeria's goal tally first, score column indicates score after each Boutaleb goal.

List of international goals scored by Inès Boutaleb
No.	Date	Venue	Opponent	Score	Result	Competition
1	11 April 2023	Centre Technique National de Sidi Moussa, Algiers, Algeria	Tanzania	1–0	3–0	Friendly
2	30 November 2023	Stade du 5 Juillet, Algiers, Algeria	Burundi	1–1	5–1	2024 WAFCON qualification
3	30 November 2023	Stade du 5 Juillet, Algiers, Algeria	Burundi	2–1	5–1	2024 WAFCON qualification
4	30 November 2023	Stade du 5 Juillet, Algiers, Algeria	Burundi	4–1	5–1	2024 WAFCON qualification
5	4 December 2023	Stade du 5 Juillet, Algiers, Algeria	Burundi	1–0	1–0	2024 WAFCON qualification
