= Algeria women's national football team =

Women's national association football team representing Algeria

Algeria
- Nickname: الأفناك (The Fennecs)
- Association: Algerian Football Federation
- Other affiliation: UAFA (Arab Nations)
- Confederation: CAF (Africa)
- Sub-confederation: UNAF (North Africa)
- Head coach: Farid Benstiti
- Captain: Sofia Guellati
- Most caps: Naïma Bouhani (61)
- Top scorer: Naïma Bouhani (36)
- Home stadium: Stade du 5 Juillet
- FIFA code: ALG
First colours	Second colours

FIFA ranking
- Current: 74 ▼1 (16 June 2026)
- Highest: 64 (June – September 2009)
- Lowest: 97 (December 2003)

First international
- France 14–0 Algeria (Cesson-Sévigné, France; 14 May 1998)

Biggest win
- Algeria 14–0 Sudan (Algiers, Algeria; 20 October 2021)

Biggest defeat
- France 14–0 Algeria (Cesson-Sévigné, France; 14 May 1998)

World Cup
- Appearances: 1 (first in 2027)

Women's Africa Cup of Nations
- Appearances: 7 (first in 2004)
- Best result: Third Place (2026)

UNAF Women's Tournament
- Appearances: 3 (first in 2009)
- Best result: Runners-up (2009)

Arab Women's Cup
- Appearances: 2 (first in 2006)
- Best result: Champions (2006)
Medal record
Women's Africa Cup of Nations
Bronze medal – third place	2026 Morocco
African Games
Bronze medal – third place	2011 Maputo	Team
UNAF Women's Tournament
Silver medal – second place	2009 Tunisia
Arab Women's Cup
Gold medal – first place	2006 Egypt

The Algeria women's national football team (Arabic: منتخب الجزائر لكرة القدم للسيدات) represents Algeria in international women's football.

Algeria played its first match in 1998, against France, and lost 14–0. The team has qualified for the World Cup once, in 2027. It has qualified seven times for the Women's Africa Cup of Nations.

Algeria plays its home games at the Stade du 5 Juillet in Algiers and has been coached by Farid Benstiti since December 2022. They are currently ranked 74th in the world in the FIFA women's rankings. The team's highest ranking was 64th, in June 2009.

== Team image ==
=== Kits and crest ===
==== Kit suppliers ====
Kit providers	Period
Cirta Sport	1998–2001
Baliston	2002–2004
(France) Le Coq Sportif	2004–2009
(Germany) Puma	2010–2014
(Germany) Adidas	2015–present

===== 1st Kit =====
2004 AWC; 2006 AWC	2010 AWC	2014 AWC	2016 AWCON

===== 2nd Kit =====
2004 AWC; 2006 AWC	2010 AWC	2014 AWC	2016 AWCON

=== Home stadium ===
The Algeria women's national football team plays their home matches on the Stade du 5 Juillet.

== Results and fixtures ==
The following is a list of match results in the last 12 months, as well as any future matches that have been scheduled.

Legend

Win Draw Lose Fixture

=== 2025 ===
23 October 2025 2026 WAFCON qualifying	Algeria	2–1	Cameroon	Oran, Algeria
19:00 UTC+1	Karchouni 23'; Dafeur 35'	Report	Nchout 90+4' (pen.)	Stadium: Miloud Hadefi Stadium; Referee: Awa Ilboudo (Burkina Faso)

28 October 2025 2026 WAFCON qualifying	Cameroon	0–1 (1–3 agg.)	Algeria	Douala, Cameroon
16:00 UTC+1		Report	Dafeur 23'	Stadium: Stade de la Réunification; Attendance: 0 (Behind closed doors); Referee: Diana Murungi (Uganda)
Note: Algeria won 3–1 on aggregate.

26 November 2025 Friendly	Algeria	2–1	Kenya	Blida, Algeria
17:00 UTC+1	Khezami 47', 90'		Jereko 15'	Stadium: Mustapha Tchaker Stadium; Referee: Dhikra Houia (Algeria)

30 November 2025 Friendly	Algeria	1–1	Kenya	Blida, Algeria
15:00 UTC+1	Belloumou 90+2'		Jereko 65'	Stadium: Mustapha Tchaker Stadium

=== 2026 ===
28 February 2026 Friendly	Egypt	0–3	Algeria	Cairo, Egypt
20:45 UTC+2		Report (FAF)	Boussaha 49'; Khiri 55'; Naili 87'	Stadium: EFA Center; Referee: Mohamed El-Ghazi (Egypt)

2 March 2026 Friendly	Egypt	2–3	Algeria	Cairo, Egypt
21:30 UTC+2	El Behery 37'; Nadda 49'	Report (FAF)	D'Oria 33'; Boutaleb 61'; Khiri 74'	Stadium: EFA Center

14 April 2026 Friendly	South Africa	1–0	Algeria	Durban, South Africa
15:00 UTC+2	Majiya 35'	Report (SAFA); Report (FAF)		Stadium: Princess Magogo Stadium; Referee: Vistoria Shangula (Namibia)

17 April 2026 Friendly	South Africa	2–0	Algeria	Durban, South Africa
15:00 UTC+2	Majiya 58'; O'Malley 86'	Report (SAFA); Report (FAF)		Stadium: King Zwelithini Stadium; Referee: Seonyatseng Tshephe (Botswana)

19 July 2026 Friendly	Algeria	1–1	Zambia	Blida, Algeria
18:00 UTC+1	Guellati 87' (pen.)		Chipasula 47'; Chanda (yellow card) 59'; Mufunte (yellow card) 86' (yellow-red card) 90+5'	Stadium: Mustapha Tchaker Stadium; Referee: Noura Samir (Egypt)

22 July 2026 Friendly	Algeria	1–0	Zambia	Blida, Algeria
18:00 UTC+1	D'Oria (yellow card) 68'; Naïli 83'		Nachula (yellow card) 38'; Lubandji (penalty missed) 88'	Stadium: Mustapha Tchaker Stadium; Referee: Noura Samir (Egypt)

26 July 2026 2026 WAFCON GS	Algeria	2–0	Senegal	Rabat, Morocco
18:00 UTC+0	Dafeur 42' (pen.); Bethi 88'	Report		Stadium: Rabat Olympic Stadium; Referee: Akhona Makalima (South Africa)

30 July 2026 2026 WAFCON GS	Morocco	1–0	Algeria	Rabat, Morocco
21:00 UTC+0	Mssoudy 84'	Report (FIFA)		Stadium: Moulay El Hassan Stadium; Referee: Aline Guimbang Etong (Cameroon)

3 August 2026 2026 WAFCON GS	Kenya	0–2	Algeria	Rabat, Morocco
21:00 UTC+0		Report (FIFA)	Dafeur 14'; Bendris 23'	Stadium: Rabat Olympic Stadium; Referee: Aïssatou Kanté (Guinea)

8 August 2026 WAfCON QF	Ivory Coast	1–2	Algeria	Casablanca, Morocco
17:00 GMT	Inès Konan 29'; N'Sira Ouedraogo (red card) 42'; Rebecca Elloh (penalty missed) 62'	Report	Inès Khiri 56'; Amira Ould Braham 64'	Stadium: Moulay Rachid Stadium; Referee: Shamirah Nabadda (Uganda)

12 August 2026 2026 WAFCON SF	Algeria	1–3	Malawi	Rabat, Morocco
18:00 UTC+0	Adjabi 60'		Ta. Chawinga 33', 76'; Te. Chawinga 45+1'	Stadium: Moulay El Hassan Stadium; Referee: Eunice Akintoye (Nigeria)

15 August 2026 2026 WAFCON TPM	Morocco	1–1 (2–3 p)	Algeria	Rabat, Morocco
18:00 UTC+0	Azraf 37'	Report (FIFA)	Boussaha 83'	Stadium: Rabat Olympic Stadium; Referee: Josphine Wanjiku (Kenya)
	Penalties
	Redouani (penalty missed); Nakkach (penalty scored); Boutiebi (penalty scored); Mourtaji (penalty missed); Badri (penalty missed)		(penalty scored) Dafeur; (penalty missed) Braham; (penalty scored) Bekhaled; (penalty missed) Khezami; (penalty scored) Belloumou

9 October 2028 OG qualifying	Central African Rep.	0–8	Algeria	Algiers, Algeria
18:00 UTC+1			Ndoumba 20' (o.g.); Dafeur 26'; Boussaha 29'; Bekhaled 36'; Naili 51'; Belloumou 67'; Bendris 80'; Bahlouli 90'	Stadium: 5 July 1962 Stadium; Referee: Seonyatseng Tshephe (Botswana)

13 October 2028 OG qualifying	Algeria	7–0	Central African Rep.	Tizi Ouzou, Algeria
18:00 UTC+1	Bendris 2', 52'; Bethi 4', 44'; Dafeur 39' (pen.); Bekhaled 60' (pen.); Smaali 64'			Stadium: Hocine Aït Ahmed Stadium; Referee: Aida Sy (Senegal)

=== 2027 ===
23 February–6 March 2028 OG qualifying	Algeria	–	Burkina Faso
18:00 UTC+1

23 February–6 March 2028 OG qualifying	Burkina Faso	–	Algeria
18:00 UTC+1

== Coaching staff ==
=== Current coaching staff ===
As of 10 July 2023

Position	Name
Head coach	(France) Farid Benstiti
Assistant coach	(France) Djamel Fredj
Goalkeeping coach	(France) Mamadou Bah
Physical coach	(Algeria) Moahmed Cherifi
Video analyst	(Algeria) Djalil Bouglali

=== Manager history ===
Years	Name	Ref.
(Algeria) Azzedine Chih	1998–2018	
(Algeria) Radia Fertoul	2018–2019	
(France) Sonia Haziraj	2019	
(Algeria) Kamel Betina	2019	
(Algeria) Madjid Taleb	2019–2021	
(Algeria) Radia Fertoul	2021–2022	
(France) Farid Benstiti	2022–present	

== Players ==
=== Current squad ===
The following 26 players were named for the 2028 CAF Women's Olympic qualifying tournament matches against the Central African Republic on 9 and 13 October 2026.

No.	Pos.	Player	Date of birth (age)	Club
	GK	Chloé N'Gazi	6 June 1996 (age 30)	(French Football Federation) Fleury 91
	GK	Amina Haleyi	10 September 1992 (age 34)	(Algerian Football Federation) CEA Sétif
	GK	Amel Benabdallah	18 October 2004 (age 22)	(Algerian Football Federation) CF Akbou
	DF	Mélinne D'Oria	7 August 2001 (age 25)	(French Football Federation) Nice
	DF	Célina Ould Hocine	3 February 2002 (age 24)	(French Football Federation) Paris FC
	DF	Ouassila Alouache	11 July 2000 (age 26)	(Algerian Football Federation) CF Akbou
	DF	Morgane Belkhiter	23 November 1995 (age 30)	(French Football Federation) Saint-Malo
	DF	Inès Belloumou	21 July 2001 (age 25)	(The Football Association) West Ham United
	DF	Emma Smaali	29 September 2000 (age 26)	(French Football Federation) Lens
	DF	Lana Smits	24 January 2005 (age 21)	(French Football Federation) Stade de Reims
	DF	Sarah Compaoré	4 October 2007 (age 19)	(French Football Federation) Les Marseillaises
	MF	Mélissa Bethi	18 November 2005 (age 20)	(United States Soccer Federation) Washington Spirit
	MF	Wissem Bouzid	18 December 2002 (age 23)	(French Football Federation) Lille
	MF	Lina Boussaha	16 January 1999 (age 27)	(Saudi Arabian Football Federation) Al Ittihad
	MF	Sofia Bekhaled	20 October 2006 (age 20)	(French Football Federation) OL Lyonnes
	MF	Nesrine Bahlouli	20 February 2003 (age 23)	(Saudi Arabian Football Federation) Al Nassr
	MF	Amira Ould Braham	17 February 1998 (age 28)	(Turkish Football Federation) Beşiktaş
	MF	Marine Dafeur	20 October 1994 (age 32)	(The Football Association) Bristol City
	MF	Anaïs Oularbi	24 March 2003 (age 23)	(Canadian Soccer Association) Vancouver Rise
	MF	Aïcha Hamidèche	2 October 2001 (age 25)	(Algerian Football Federation) CF Akbou
	FW	Laura Taleb Muller	9 January 1999 (age 27)	(Turkish Football Federation) Yüksekova
	FW	Ikram Adjabi	23 May 1998 (age 28)	(French Football Federation) Le Havre
	FW	Lynda Bendris	25 July 2004 (age 22)	(French Football Federation) Cannes
	FW	Célia Aggoune	9 January 2007 (age 19)	(French Football Federation) Lens
	FW	Inès Khiri	28 March 1999 (age 27)	(Swiss Football Association) Yverdon
	FW	Nouhed Naili	11 April 2001 (age 25)	(French Football Federation) Cannes

=== Recent call-ups ===
The following players have also been called up to the squad within the past 12 months.

Pos.	Player	Date of birth (age)	Caps	Goals	Club	Latest call-up
GK	Amira Benaïssa	26 July 2007 (age 19)	—	—	(France) Fleury 91	2026 Africa Cup of Nations
DF	Sofia Guellati	9 July 1992 (age 34)	—	—	Free Agent	2026 Africa Cup of Nations
DF	Roselène Khezami	2 September 2001 (age 25)	—	—	(Saudi Arabia) Al-Ula	2026 Africa Cup of Nations
DF	Léa Abadou	12 March 1997 (age 29)	—	—	(Switzerland) FC Sion	2026 Africa Cup of Nations
DF	Lisa Jacob	18 January 2005 (age 21)	—	—	(Indonesia) Persija Jakarta	v. South Africa; 17 April 2026
DF	Chaima Abdeslem		—	—	(Algeria) JS Kabylie	v. Egypt; 2 March 2026
MF	Ikram Sidi Moussa	12 June 2004 (age 22)	—	—	(France) Fleury 91	v. Egypt; 2 March 2026
FW	Khouloud Ournani	23 July 2003 (age 23)	—	—	(Saudi Arabia) Al-Hmmah	2026 Africa Cup of Nations
FW	Inès Boutaleb	8 November 1998 (age 28)	—	—	(France) Auxerre	2026 Africa Cup of Nations
FW	Morgane Ikene	13 January 1999 (age 27)	—	—	(France) Saint-Malo	2026 Africa Cup of Nations
FW	Ferial Daoui	15 December 1999 (age 26)	—	—	(Algeria) CS Constantine	v. Egypt; 2 March 2026
^{INJ} Player withdrew from the squad due to an injury.^{PRE} Preliminary squad.^{SUS} Player is serving a suspension.^{WD} Player withdrew for personal reasons.

=== Previous squads ===
Women's Africa Cup of Nations

- 2010 African Women's Championship squad
- 2014 African Women's Championship squad
- 2018 Africa Women Cup of Nations squad
- 2024 Africa Women Cup of Nations squad
- 2026 Africa Women Cup of Nations squad

UNAF Women's Tournament

- 2020 UNAF Women's Tournament squad

Arab Women's Cup

- 2021 Arab Women's Cup squad

== Records ==
*Active players in bold, statistics correct as of 25 August 2021.

=== Most appearances ===
#	Player	Year(s)	Caps

=== Top goalscorers ===
Rank	Player	Goals	Caps	Years
1	Naïma Bouhani	36	61	2002–2025
2	Dalila Zerrouki	21	52	2000–2015
3	Naïma Laouadi	17	45	2000–2009
4	Lydia Boumrar	12	—	2004–2011
5	**Ghoutia Karchouni**	9	14	2023–
6	**Marine Dafeur**	8	28	2023–

== Competitive record ==
=== FIFA Women's World Cup ===
FIFA Women's World Cup record
Appearances: 1
Year	Round	Position	Pld	W	D	L	GF	GA	GD
(China) 1991	Did not enter								
(Sweden) 1995	Did not enter								
(United States) 1999	Did not enter								
(United States) 2003	Did not enter								
(China) 2007	Did not qualify								
(Germany) 2011	Did not qualify								
(Canada) 2015	Did not qualify								
(France) 2019	Did not qualify								
(Australia) (New Zealand) 2023	Did not qualify								
(Brazil) 2027	Qualified								
(Costa Rica) (Jamaica) (Mexico) (United States) 2031	To be determined								
(United Kingdom) 2035	To be determined								
Total		1/10	0	0	0	0	0	0	0

=== Olympic Games ===
Summer Olympics record
Appearances: 0
Year	Round	Position	Pld	W	D	L	GF	GA	GD
(United States) 1996	Did not enter								
(Australia) 2000	Did not enter								
(Greece) 2004	Did not enter								
(China) 2008	Did not qualify								
(United Kingdom) 2012	Did not enter								
(Brazil) 2016	Did not enter								
(Japan) 2020	Did not qualify								
(France) 2024	Did not enter								
(United States) 2028	To be determined								
(Australia) 2032	To be determined								
Total		0/8	0	0	0	0	0	0	0

=== Women's Africa Cup of Nations ===
Women's Africa Cup of Nations record
Appearances: 7
Year	Round	Position	Pld	W	D	L	GF	GA	GD
1991	Did not enter								
1995	Did not enter								
(Nigeria) 1998	Did not enter								
(South Africa) 2000	Did not qualify								
(Nigeria) 2002	Did not enter								
(South Africa) 2004	Group stage	6th	3	1	0	2	4	7	−3
(Nigeria) 2006	Group stage	8th	3	0	1	2	3	13	−10
(Equatorial Guinea) 2008	Did not qualify								
(South Africa) 2010	Group stage	7th	3	0	0	3	2	5	−3
(Equatorial Guinea) 2012	Did not enter								
(Namibia) 2014	Group stage	7th	3	1	0	2	2	7	−5
(Cameroon) 2016	Did not qualify								
(Ghana) 2018	Group stage	7th	3	0	0	3	2	7	−5
2020	Canceled								
(Morocco) 2022	Did not qualify								
(Morocco) 2024	Quarter-finals	6th	4	1	3	0	1	0	+1
(Morocco) 2026	**Bronze medal**	**3rd**	**6**	**3**	**1**	**2**	**8**	**6**	**+2**
Total:7/16	Bronze medal	3rd	25	6	5	14	22	45	−23

=== African Games ===
African Games record
Appearances: 4
Year	Round	Position	Pld	W	D	L	GF	GA	GD
(Nigeria) 2003	Group stage	7th	3	0	0	3	3	11	−8
(Algeria) 2007	Fourth place	4th	4	1	0	3	5	11	−6
(Mozambique) 2011	Bronze medal	3rd	4	2	0	2	10	7	+3
(Republic of the Congo) 2015	Did not enter								
(Morocco) 2019^{1}	Fourth place	4th	6	2	0	3	5	8	−3
(Ghana) 2023^{1}	Did not enter								
(Egypt) 2027	To be determined								
Total	Bronze medal	4/5	17	5	0	11	23	36	−13

1. Tournament open to the national U-20 teams

=== UNAF Women's Tournament ===
UNAF Women's Tournament record
Appearances: 3
Year	Round	Position	Pld	W	D	L	GF	GA	GD
(Tunisia) 2009	Runners-up	2nd	2	0	1	1	1	2	−1
(Tunisia) 2020	Fourth place	4th	4	1	1	2	8	6	+2
(Egypt) 2023	Canceled								
Total	Runners-up	3/3	6	1	2	3	9	8	+1

=== Arab Women's Cup ===
Arab Women's Cup record
Appearances: 2
Year	Round	Position	Pld	W	D	L	GF	GA	GD
(Egypt) 2006	Winners	1st	4	3	1	0	16	0	+16
(Egypt) 2021	Semi-finals	3rd	3	2	1	0	9	4	+5
Total	Winners	2/2	7	5	2	0	25	4	+21

== Honours ==
- **Women's Africa Cup of Nations**

Bronze medal: (1): (2026)

- **African Games**

Bronze medal: (1): (2011)

- **UNAF Women's Tournament**

Runners-up: (1): (2009)

- **Arab Women's Cup**

Champions: (1): (2006)

== See also ==
- Sport in Algeria
  - Football in Algeria
    - Women's football in Algeria
- Algeria women's national under-20 football team
- Algeria women's national under-17 football team
- Algeria men's national football team
