= Morgane Ikene =

Algerian footballer (born 1999)

Personal information
- Date of birth: 13 January 1999 (age 27)
- Place of birth: Mont-Saint-Aignan, France
- Position: Forward

Team information
- Current team: Saint-Malo
- Number: 19

Youth career
- 2006–2014: US Quevilly-Rouen
- 2014–2016: Arras

Senior career*
Years	Team	Apps	(Gls)
2016–2017	Arras	2	(0)
2017–2018	Rouen	19	(2)
2018–	Saint-Malo	80	(27)

International career^{‡}
2015	France U16	1	(1)
2016	France U17	5	(0)
2024–	Algeria	3	(0)
- * Club domestic league appearances and goals as of 13 October 2024 ‡ National team caps and goals as of 27 November 2024

Morgane Ikene (Arabic: مورغان إيكن; born 13 January 1999) is a professional footballer who plays as a forward for Première Ligue club Saint-Malo. Born in France, she plays for the Algeria national team.

== Club career ==
Ikene began playing football at age six with US Quevilly-Rouen and continued there until 2014, when she joined Arras.

In September 2017, Rouen announced the signing of Ikene as a reinforcement.

In July 2018, She signed with Division 2 Féminine side US Saint-Malo. On 2 September 2018, she made her debut for the club in a 1–2 loss to GPSO 92 Issy. She scored her first goal for the team against Saint-Maur on 16 September 2018.

== International career ==
Ikene is a former French youth international, having represented France at the under-16 and under-17 levels.

On 21 October 2024, Ikene received her first call-up to the Algerian senior national team to participate in a doubleheader against the Nigeria.

== Career statistics ==
=== Club ===
As of match played 13 October 2024

Appearances and goals by club, season and competition
Club	Season	League			cup		Continental		Other		Total	
Club	Season	Division	Apps	Goals	Apps	Goals	Apps	Goals	Apps	Goals	Apps	Goals
Arras	2016–17	D2F	2	0							2	0
Arras	Total		2	0	–		–		–		2	0
Rouen	2017–18	D2F	18	2	1	0					19	2
Rouen	Total		18	2	1	0	–		–		19	2
US Saint-Malo	2018–19	D2F	22	12	2	0					24	12
US Saint-Malo	2019–20	D2F	2	1							2	1
US Saint-Malo	2020–21	D2F									0	0
US Saint-Malo	2021–22	D2F	11	4	1	0					12	4
US Saint-Malo	2022–23	D2F	21	3							21	3
US Saint-Malo	2023–24	D3F	12	5	1	0					13	5
US Saint-Malo	2024–25	SL	5	1							5	1
US Saint-Malo	Total		73	26	5	0	–		–		78	26
Career total			93	28	6	0	–		–		99	28

=== International ===
As of match played 27 November 2024

Appearances and goals by national team and year
National team	Year	Apps	Goals
Algeria	2024	3	0
Total		3	0
