= Sandra Maurice =

French footballer (born 1987)

Personal information
- Date of birth: 16 October 1987 (age 39)
- Place of birth: Albi, France
- Height: 1.72 m (5 ft 8 in)
- Position: Forward

Sandra Maurice (born 16 October 1987) is a French footballer who played for Toulouse FC in the Seconde Ligue. Maurice also played for FC Rouen.
