= Mélissa Bethi =

Algerian footballer (born 2005)

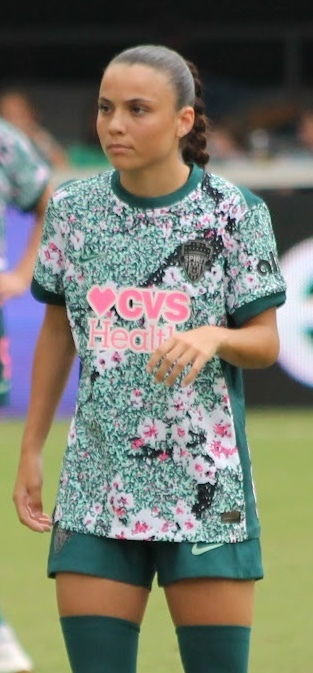
- Bethi with the Washington Spirit in 2026

Personal information
- Date of birth: 18 November 2005 (age 20)
- Place of birth: Firminy, France
- Height: 1.60 m (5 ft 3 in)
- Position: Midfielder

Team information
- Current team: Washington Spirit
- Number: 7

Youth career
- 2013–2020: FCO Firminy Intersport
- 2020–2024: Lyon

Senior career*
Years	Team	Apps	(Gls)
2022–2024	Lyon	2	(0)
2023–2024	Lyon B	8	(1)
2024–2026	Nantes	27	(2)
2024–2025	→ Metz (loan)	15	(1)
2026–	Washington Spirit	9	(2)

International career^{‡}
2023–2024	Algeria U20	3	(1)
2023–	Algeria	6	(0)
- * Club domestic league appearances and goals as of 05:22, 15 November 2026 (UTC) ‡ National team caps and goals as of 10 July 2025

Mélissa Bethi (Arabic: ميليسا بتحي; born 18 November 2005) is a professional footballer who plays as a midfielder for the Washington Spirit of the National Women's Soccer League (NWSL). Born in France, she plays for the Algeria national team. She has previously played for French clubs Lyon, Nantes, and Metz.

== Club career ==
Born in Firminy to Nasser and Sandra Bethi, Melissa is of Algerian descent. In 2013, at the age of 8, Bethi began playing football in her hometown with FCO Firminy Intersport and has been a key player, playing in the first team of the club's youth age categories from U9 to U15. after 7 years with the club, she joined the Olympique Lyonnais academy.

On 24 September 2023, Bethi made her debut for the reserve team in Division 3 Féminine in a 5–0 win over Arlac Mérignac. On 1 May 2024, she scored her first goal for the team to seal the win against Le Puy.

On 24 April 2024, Bethi made her debut for the first team of Lyon in a 2–1 win over Guingamp.

In July 2026, Bethi signed with the Washington Spirit through the 2029 NWSL season, with her official move to the Spirit's active roster slated to come after the 2026 Women's Africa Cup of Nations.

== International career ==
=== Youth ===
In 2020, Bethi was pre-selected for the French under-16 team.

On 10 April 2023, She scored her first goal for the under-20 team against Tanzania. In July 2023, she was called to the under-20 team to face Ivory Coast senior team. In September 2023, she was selected for the final squad to face Mali in the African qualifiers for the 2024 U-20 Women's World Cup.

=== Senior ===
In April 2023, She got her official first call-up to the Algerian senior team to face Tanzania in two friendly matches. She played in the friendly match against ASE Alger Centre and scored a goal in a 2–0 win. On 4 April 2024, she officially debuted for the team in a 1–2 loss against Tunisia, entering the game as a substitute for Roselène Khezami.

On 6 July 2026, Bethi was announced to Algeria's 26-player roster for the 2026 Women's Africa Cup of Nations.

== Career statistics ==
=== Club ===
As of match played 8 May 2024

Appearances and goals by club, season and competition
Club	Season	League			Cup		Continental		Other		Total	
Club	Season	Division	Apps	Goals	Apps	Goals	Apps	Goals	Apps	Goals	Apps	Goals
Olympique Lyonnais	2022–23	D1F	—		0	0	—		—		0	0
Olympique Lyonnais	2023–24	D1F	2	0	—		—		5 (Note: Appearance with Lyon reserve team 'Lyon B')	1 (Note: Goals with Lyon reserve team 'Lyon B')	7	1
Career total			2	0	0	0	—		5	1	7	1

=== International ===
As of match played 3 June 2024

Appearances and goals by national team and year
National team	Year	Apps	Goals
Algeria	2024	1	0
Total		1	0

== Honours ==
Lyon

- Division 1 Féminine: 2023–24
- Championnat de France féminin de football des U-19: 2022, 2024

Individual

- UNFP Première Ligue team of the season: 2025–26
