= Amira Ould Braham =

Algerian footballer (born 1998)

Personal information
- Date of birth: 17 February 1998 (age 28)
- Place of birth: Aïn El Hammam, Algeria
- Position: Midfielder

Team information
- Current team: Trabzonspor

Youth career
- 2007–2011: Villeneuve-le-Roi FC
- 2011–2016: FCF Juvisy

Senior career*
Years	Team	Apps	(Gls)
2016–2017	FCF Juvisy	4	(0)
2017–2018	VGA Saint-Maur	14	(0)
2018–2022	Orléans	38	(3)
2022–2023	Brest	19	(0)
2023–2025	Nantes	36	(1)
2025–	Trabzonspor	2	(0)

International career^{‡}
2014–2015	France U17	10	(2)
2017	France U19	3	(0)
2018	France U20	1	(0)
2021–	Algeria	22	(3)
- * Club domestic league appearances and goals as of 15 October 2025 ‡ National team caps and goals as of 19 July 2024

Amira Ould Braham (Arabic: أميرة ولد براهم; born 17 February 1998) is a professional footballer who plays as a midfielder for Turkish Women's Football Super League (KFSL) club Trabzonspor. Born in France and a former France youth international, she plays for the Algeria national team.

== Early life ==
Born in Aïn El Hammam, Tizi Ouzou Province, Algeria.

== Club career ==
Ould Braham started playing football for her local youth team Villeneuve-le-Roi FC before joining FCF Juvisy youth academy in 2011. She made her senior debut for Juvisy in the Division 1 Féminine in the 2016–17 season. In July 2017, one season later she got signed by VGA Saint-Maur for the 2017–18 season.

in 2018, US Orléans announced the signing of Ould Braham. In September 2019, while she became the captain of the team, she suffered a complete anterior cruciate ligament rupture, which kept her away from the field for several months. after four seasons with the club, she joined Stade brestois 29 in 2022 for the 2022–23 season of Division 2 Féminine.

In 2023, Amira signed with Nantes. in the Division 2 Féminine.

On 5 July 2025 she left Nantes as a free agent for Trabzonspor.

== International career ==
Born in Algeria, Ould Braham represented France's youth teams namely U17, U19, and U20. and was a part of France's 2015 UEFA Women's Under-17 Championship squad.

In October 2021, Ould Braham got its first call-up to the Algerian national team to face Sudan as a part of the 2022 Women's Africa Cup of Nations qualification. On 20 October 2021, she debuted for the national team as a starter and scored a brace in the 14–0 historic win.

== Career statistics ==
As of match played 26 November 2023

Appearances and goals by club, season and competition
Club	Season	League			Cup		Continental		Other		Total	
Club	Season	Division	Apps	Goals	Apps	Goals	Apps	Goals	Apps	Goals	Apps	Goals
FCF Juvisy	2015–16	Division 1 Féminine	0	0	–	–	—		—		0	0
FCF Juvisy	2016–17	Division 1 Féminine	3	0	1	0	—		—		4	0
FCF Juvisy	Total		3	0	1	0	—		—		4	0
VGA Saint-Maur	2017–18	Division 2 Féminine	13	0	1	0	—		—		14	0
VGA Saint-Maur	Total		13	0	1	0	—		—		14	0
US Orléans	2018–19	Division 2 Féminine	20	1	–	–	—		—		20	1
US Orléans	2019–20	Division 2 Féminine	1	0	–	–	—		—		1	0
US Orléans	2020–21	Division 2 Féminine	1	0	–	–	—		—		1	0
US Orléans	2021–22	Division 2 Féminine	15	1	1	1	—		—		16	2
US Orléans	Total		37	2	1	1	—		—		38	3
Stade brestois 29	2022–23	Division 2 Féminine	18	0	1	0	—		—		19	0
Stade brestois 29	Total		18	0	1	0	—		—		19	0
Nantes	2023–24	Division 2 Féminine	8	1	–	–	—		—		8	1
Nantes	Total		8	1	–	–	—		—		8	1
Career total			79	3	4	1	—		—		83	4

=== International ===
As of match played 5 December 2023

Appearances and goals by national team and year
National team	Year	Apps	Goals
Algeria	2021	3	3
Algeria	2022	1	0
Algeria	2023	7	0
Total		13	4

==== International goals ====
#	Date	Venue	Opponent	Score	Result	Competition
1	20 October 2021	Omar Hamadi Stadium, Algiers, Algeria	Sudan	7–0	14–0	2022 Africa Cup of Nations qualification
2	20 October 2021	Omar Hamadi Stadium, Algiers, Algeria	Sudan	8–0	14–0	2022 Africa Cup of Nations qualification
3	25 November 2021	Stade de Ariana, Ariana, Tunisia	Tunisia	1–0	1–0	International Friendly
