= Chloé N'Gazi =

Algerian footballer (born 1996)

Personal information
- Full name: Chloé Yamina N'Gazi Boumrar
- Date of birth: 6 June 1996 (age 30)
- Place of birth: Meudon, France
- Height: 1.75 m (5 ft 9 in)
- Position: Goalkeeper

Team information
- Current team: Marseille
- Number: 96

College career
Years	Team	Apps	(Gls)
2016–2018	UCF Knights	10	(0)

Senior career*
Years	Team	Apps	(Gls)
2011–2013	GPSO 92 Issy	2	(0)
2013–2015	Paris Saint-Germain	0	(0)
2019–2022	Orléans	38	(0)
2022–2024	Fleury	15	(0)
2024	Le Havre	0	(0)
2025–	Marseille	0	(0)

International career^{‡}
2013	France U16		
2021–	Algeria	13	(0)
- * Club domestic league appearances and goals as of 29 September 2024 ‡ National team caps and goals as of 20 December 2024

Chloé Yamina N'Gazi Boumrar (Arabic: كلوي نقازي; born 6 June 1996) is a footballer who plays as a goalkeeper for Seconde Ligue club Marseille. Born in France, she plays for the Algeria national team.

== Early life ==
Born in Meudon a municipality in the southwestern suburbs of Paris. She began playing football aged 8 where she played in the AS Meudon club. in which she played with the boys for a year.

== Club career ==
After competing for GPSO 92 Issy at the age of 15, N'Gazi's talents caught the attention of Paris Saint-Germain. Subsequently, she embarked on a training and developmental journey with the club before eventually venturing to the United States.

=== UCF Knights ===
She spent a span of four seasons in the United States, at the University of Central Florida, where she played for UCF Knights in Orlando.

=== US Orléans ===
In 2019, N'Gazi made the come back to France where she was signed by Orléans.

=== Fleury ===
After three seasons with US Orléans, she Joined Division 1 Féminine side FC Fleury. As the second goalkeeper in the team hierarchy, it wasn't until November 25, 2022, that she had the opportunity to play her inaugural match donning her new team's colors. This event transpired during the closing moments of a game against Reims, which took place on the 9th matchday of the D1 league.

== International career ==
In March 2020, N'Gazi was called for the first time for the Algeria national team. to participate in a preparation camp for the first round of the 2020 Women's Africa Cup of Nations qualification.

In October 2021. she was selected by the coach Radia Fertoul to participate in a double legged game against Sudan as part of the 2022 Women's Africa Cup of Nations qualification. earning her first cap in the first leg, in which Algeria achieve a historic 14–0 over Sudan.

== Career statistics ==
=== Club ===
As of match played 12 August 2023

Appearances and goals by club, season and competition
Club	Season	League			Cup		Continental		Other		Total	
Club	Season	Division	Apps	Goals	Apps	Goals	Apps	Goals	Apps	Goals	Apps	Goals
US Orleans	2019–20	D2F	11	0	3	0	–	–	—		14	0
US Orleans	2020–21	D2F	5	0	–	–	–	–	—		5	0
US Orleans	2021–22	D2F	17	0	2	0	–	–	—		19	0
FC Fleury 91	2022–23	D1F	1	0	–	–	–	–	—		1	0
FC Fleury 91	2023–24	D1F	—	—	–	–	–	–	—		—	—
Career total			34	0	5	0	–	–	—		39	0
