= Roselène Khezami =

Algerian footballer (born 2001)

Personal information
- Date of birth: 2 September 2001 (age 25)
- Place of birth: Marseille, France
- Height: 1.57 m (5 ft 2 in)
- Position: Defender

Team information
- Current team: Marseille
- Number: 12

Youth career
- 2015–2018: Marseille

Senior career*
Years	Team	Apps	(Gls)
2018–2019	RC Saint-Denis	7	(1)
2019–2022	Saint-Malo	28	(3)
2022–2023	Orléans	15	(1)
2023–2026	Marseille	16	(1)

International career^{‡}
2017	France U16	5	(0)
2018	France U17	5	(0)
2021–	Algeria	7	(0)
- * Club domestic league appearances and goals as of 26 May 2024 ‡ National team caps and goals as of 27 February 2024

Roselène Khezami (Arabic: غزلان خزامي ; born 2 September 2001) is a French-Algerian professional footballer who plays as a defender for Saudi Women's Premier League club Al-Ula. Born in France, she plays for the Algeria national team.

== Club career ==
Khezami has been playing in Marseille football teams since her childhood, starting at JO Saint-Gabriel until 2012, then at Union Sportive Marseille Endoume Catalans until 2015 before joining Olympique de Marseille Academy where she stayed for 3 years.

In 2018, She signed her first professional contract with RC Saint-Denis in Division 2 Féminine. in the next season she joined US Saint-Malo where she stayed there for three seasons.

In July 2022, she moved to another Division 2 club, US Orleans, signing a one-season deal. She then signed with her youth club, Olympique de Marseille, in the summer of 2023.

== International career ==
Khezami a former French youth international, has represented France at under-16 and under-17 levels. featuring in all three matches in the Elite round of the 2018 UEFA Women's Under-17 Championship qualification.

In September 2021, She got her first call-up to the Algerian Senior team to participate in preparatory training camp for the 2022 Women's Africa Cup of Nations qualification. On 18 February 2022, She made her debut for the team, starting in a 2–0 loss to South Africa.

== Career statistics ==
=== Club ===
As of 31 March 2024

Appearances and goals by club, season and competition
Club	Season	League			Cup		Continental		Other		Total	
Club	Season	Division	Apps	Goals	Apps	Goals	Apps	Goals	Apps	Goals	Apps	Goals
RC Saint-Denis	2018–19	Division 2 Féminine	7	1	—		—		—		7	1
RC Saint-Denis	Total		7	1	—		—		—		60	19
US Saint-Malo	2019–20	Division 2 Féminine	7	1	—		—		—		7	1
US Saint-Malo	2020–21	Division 2 Féminine	6	1	—		—		—		6	1
US Saint-Malo	2021–22	Division 2 Féminine	15	1	2	0	—		—		17	1
US Saint-Malo	Total		28	3	2	0	—		—		30	3
US Orléans	2022–23	Division 2 Féminine	15	1	1	0	—		—		16	1
US Orléans	Total		15	1	1	0	—		—		16	1
Olympique de Marseille	2023–24	Division 2 Féminine	8	1	3	0	—		—		11	1
Olympique de Marseille	Total		8	1	3	0	—		—		11	1
Career total			58	6	6	0	—		—		64	6

=== International ===
As of match played 27 February 2024

Year	Algeria	
Year	Apps	Goals
2022	1	0
2023	6	0
2024	0	0
Total	7	0
