= Emma Smaali =

Algerian footballer (born 2000)

Emma Smaali إيما سماعلي
Personal information
- Full name: Emma Sabrina Smaali
- Date of birth: 29 September 2000 (age 26)
- Place of birth: Voiron, France
- Height: 1.61 m (5 ft 3 in)
- Position: Defender

Team information
- Current team: Lens
- Number: 22

Youth career
- 2015–2017: CS Nivolas

Senior career*
Years	Team	Apps	(Gls)
2017–2020	Grenoble Foot 38	34	(5)
2020–	Lens	76	(8)

International career^{‡}
2023–	Algeria	8	(0)
- * Club domestic league appearances and goals as of 26 May 2024 ‡ National team caps and goals as of 8 April 2024

Emma Sabrina Smaali (Arabic: إيما صبرينا سماعلي; born 29 September 2000) is a professional footballer who plays as a defender for Seconde Ligue club Lens. Born in France, she represents Algeria at international level.

== Club career ==
Emma Smaali was trained at FCSA until the age of fifteen, then, needing to play with a women's team, she signed with Nivolas-Vermelle and played there for two seasons with the under-19 team.

In 2017, she signed with Grenoble Foot 38 and was integrated into the senior squad in the Division 2.

On 30 July 2020, after three seasons with the Grenoble, she signed a contract with RC Lens in the same Division. Since she arrived at the 'Sang et Or', she has continued to progress. At 22 years old, Emma Smaali is one of the most important players in the strategy implemented by her coach Sarah M’Barek.

== International career ==
In July 2023, she got her first call-up to the Algeria national team by coach Farid Benstiti to participate in to participate in a double-header of friendly matches against Senegal. On 14 July 2023, she made her debut for the Fennecs against Senegal in a 3–1 loss at the Stade Lat-Dior.

== Career statistics ==
=== Club ===
As of match played 10 March 2023

Appearances and goals by club, season and competition
Club	Season	League			Cup		Total	
Club	Season	Division	Apps	Goals	Apps	Goals	Apps	Goals
Grenoble Foot 38	2017–18	D2F	3	0	0	0	3	0
Grenoble Foot 38	2018–19	D2F	15	4	5	1	20	5
Grenoble Foot 38	2019–20	D2F	10	0	1	0	11	0
Grenoble Foot 38	Total		28	4	6	1	34	5
RC Lens	2020–21	D2F	6	0	0	0	6	0
RC Lens	2021–22	D2F	21	1	2	2	23	3
RC Lens	2022–23	D2F	21	1	2	2	23	3
RC Lens	2023–24	D2F	21	1	3	1	24	2
RC Lens	Total		69	3	7	5	76	8
Career total			97	7	13	6	110	13

=== International ===
As of match played 7 April 2024

Appearances and goals by national team and year
National team	Year	Apps	Goals
Algeria	2023	3	0
Algeria	2024	5	0
Total		8	0
