= FC Nantes (women) =

Women's football club in Nantes, France

Nantes
- Full name: Football Club de Nantes
- Nicknames: La Maison Jaune (The Yellow House); Les Canaris (The Canaries)
- Founded: 2012
- Stadium: Stade Marcel-Saupin
- Capacity: 1,880
- Presidents: Waldemar Kita; Jacky Soulard
- Manager: Nicolas Chabot
- League: Première Ligue
- 2025–26: Première Ligue, 4th of 12
- Website: https://www.fcnantes.com/
Home colours	Away colours

Football Club de Nantes (Breton: Naoned; Gallo: Naunnt), commonly referred to as FC Nantes or simply Nantes (IPA: [nɑ̃t]), is a women's football club based in Nantes, France. It has been the women's section of FC Nantes since 2012. Coached by Nicolas Chabot, the club competes in the Première Ligue.

== History ==
In the summer of 2012, the plan to create a women's section of FC Nantes took effect. Firstly, youth teams were put in place, with the objective being to become a competitive feminine football club at a national scale in the long run. The senior team entered the league system in 2014, starting from the lowest tier, the third division of the District de Football de Loire-Atlantique. The club had failed to secure a merger with another club in the Nantes region, notably with Nantes Saint-Herblain.

The team rapidly progressed, successively finishing first in the third, second, and first district divisions, accessing the regional level of women's football in France ahead of the 2017–18 season. The team would shine once again during that season, finishing first in their Régional 2 group and reaching the final of the Coupe des Pays de la Loire. In the 2018–19 season, Nantes finished second in the Régional 1 behind Le Mans. The club therefore qualified for the play-offs for promotion to the Division 2 Féminine, where the team would eventually eliminate CA Paris and Le Mans. Nantes therefore reached the national level of football for the first time in the club's history, five years after the first team's entrance into the league system.

The first season in the Division 2 for Nantes was ended prematurely due to the COVID-19 pandemic, although the team did place fourth before the suspension of the league. The 2020–21 season was ended even earlier than the previous season; Nantes finished in second place in Group A. Despite a hope for promotion via play-offs, the French Football Federation finally decided that only Saint-Étienne would be promoted and that Nantes would stay in the Division 2.

On 30 July 2021, Nantes announced the appointment of Mathieu Ricoul as head coach to replace Tanguy Fétiveau, who had been managing the team since June 2017. At the beginning of the 2021–22 season, the club would have a budget of €1 million and twelve federal contracts, the maximum amount in the Division 2, with hopes of achieving promotion to the Division 1 Féminine.

== Players ==
=== Current squad ===
Note: Flags indicate national team as defined under FIFA eligibility rules; some limited exceptions apply. Players may hold more than one non-FIFA nationality.

No.	Pos.	Nation	Player
1	GK	DEN	Sofie Grøn
4	DF	DEN	Clara Jepsen
5	DF	FRA	Julie Pasquereau
6	MF	POL	Gabriela Grzybowska
7	FW	MAR	Imane Saoud
8	MF	FRA	Juliette Mossard
9	FW	FRA	Adèle Connesson
10	FW	FRA	Camille Robillard
11	FW	SUI	Noémie Potier Serrano
13	DF	GER	Victoria Krug
14	MF	LTU	Liucija Vaitukaitytė

No.	Pos.	Nation	Player
15	MF	NED	Zoï van de Ven
17	FW	CHN	Wu Chengshu
20	DF	BEL	Constance Brackman
24	DF	FRA	Margaux Vairon
26	DF	USA	Moira Kelley
27	DF	FRA	Juliane Denizot
28	MF	FRA	Madeline Roth
42	FW	COD	Esther Buabadi
51	MF	FRA	Tanté Diakité
99	GK	POL	Natalia Radkiewicz

==== Out on loan ====
Note: Flags indicate national team as defined under FIFA eligibility rules; some limited exceptions apply. Players may hold more than one non-FIFA nationality.

No.	Pos.	Nation	Player
—	MF	FRA	Lalie Rageot (at Thonon Evian until 30 June 2027)

=== Notable former players ===
- (Algeria) Amira Ould Braham
- (Algeria) Mélissa Bethi
- (Belgium) Mariam Toloba
- (Canada) Emily Burns
- (Morocco) Kenza Chapelle
- (France) Eva Frémaux
- (France) Kelly Gago
- (France) Claire Guillard
- (France) Léa Khelifi
- (France) Julie Rabanne
- (Haiti) Roseline Éloissaint
- (Haiti) Sherly Jeudy
- (Lebanon) Pilar Khoury
- (Cameroon) Yvonne Leuko
- (Canada) Christabel Oduro
- (Puerto Rico) Danielle Marcano
- (Portugal) Nelly Rodrigues
- (Cameroon) Kevine Ossol

== Managerial history ==
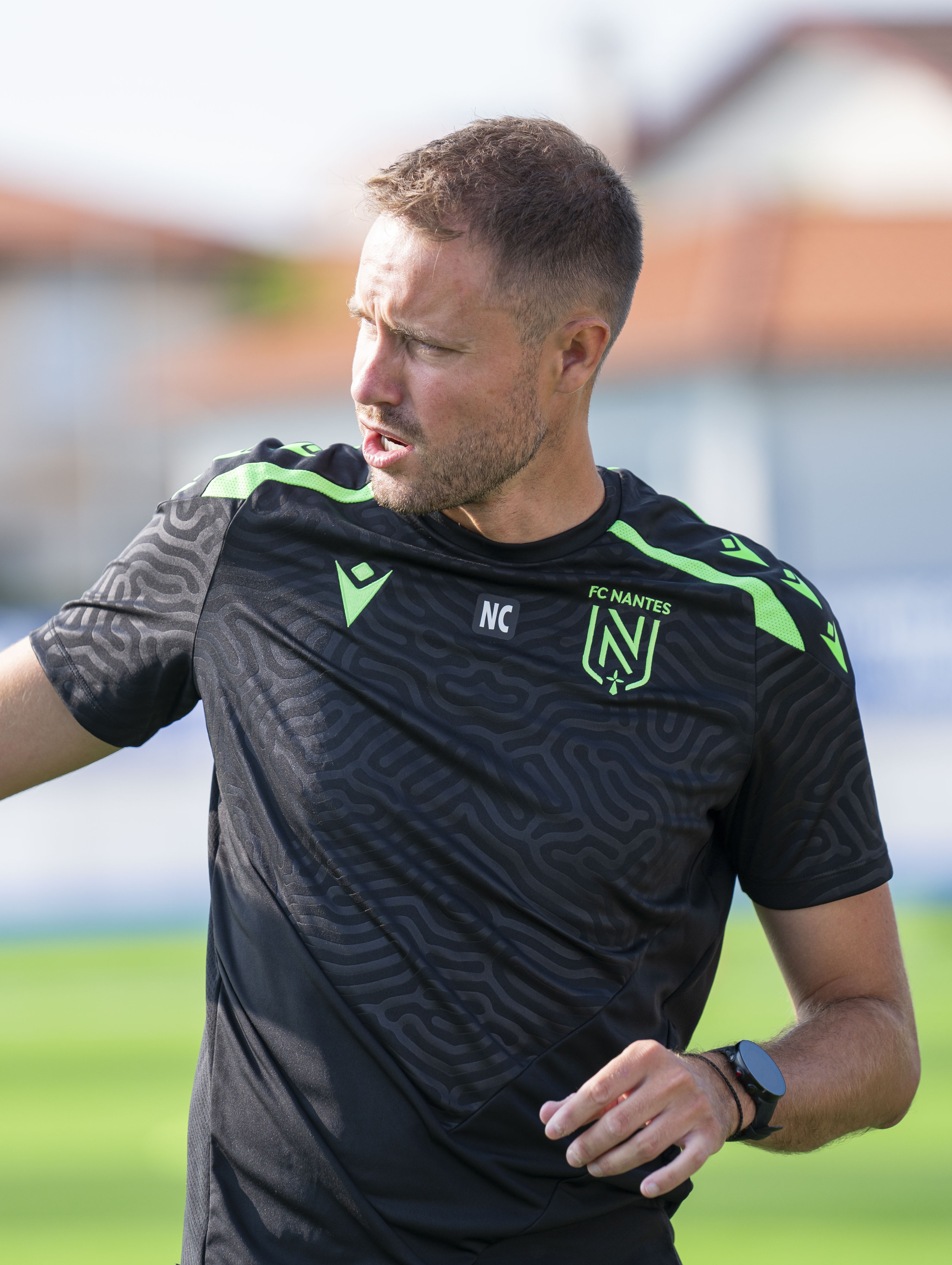
Nicolas Chabot, Nantes manager from 2023.

Below is a list of FC Nantes coaches since 2014.

Name	Nationality	Years
Gwenaël Cornu	FRA	2014–2026
Jonathan Raoul	FRA	2016–2017
Tanguy Fétiveau	FRA	2017–2021
Mathieu Ricoul	FRA	2021–2022
Oswaldo Vizcarrondo	VEN	2022–2023
Nicolas Chabot	FRA	2023–2026
Pierre-Alain Picard	FRA	2026–

== See also ==
- Category:FC Nantes (women) players
- List of women's association football clubs
- List of women's football clubs in France
