= Azzedine Chih =

Algerian football manager

Personal information
- Date of birth: 13 January 1960 (age 66)
- Place of birth: Algeria

Managerial career
- Years: Team
- 1998–2018: Algeria
- 2018–2019: Jordan

Azzedine Chih (Arabic: عز الدين شيح; born on 13 January 1960) is an Algerian football manager who coached the Algerian women's team from 1998 to 2018 and the Jordanian women's team from 2018 to 2019.

== Career ==
With the Algerian team, he was the first manager of the national selection who debuted with it in 1998. He won many titles and took part in many tournaments with the team.

With the Jordanian team, he debuted in a match against Maldives in the Olympic qualifying game in a 6–0 victory. His last match was against Vietnam, in a 0–2 defeat.
