= Marine Dafeur =

Algerian footballer (born 1994)

Personal information
- Full name: Marine Alfreda Marie Madeleine Dafeur
- Date of birth: 20 October 1994 (age 32)
- Place of birth: Douai, France
- Height: 1.66 m (5 ft 5 in)
- Positions: Left back; left midfielder

Team information
- Current team: Bristol City
- Number: 21

Youth career
- 2007–2008: Hénin-Beaumont
- 2009–2010: US Raimbeaucourt
- 2010–2012: Hénin-Beaumont

Senior career*
| Years | Team | Apps | (Gls) |
| 2011–2014 | Hénin-Beaumont | 46 | (10) |
| 2014–2016 | Guingamp | 14 | (1) |
| 2016–2019 | Lille | 59 | (5) |
| 2019–2025 | Fleury | 72 | (7) |
| 2025– | Bristol City | 0 | (0) |

International career^{‡}
| 2011–2013 | France U19 | 10 | (1) |
| 2014 | France U20 | 5 | (0) |
| 2012–2019 | France B | 13 | (0) |
| 2014–2015 | France | 2 | (0) |
| 2023– | Algeria | 9 | (3) |
- * Club domestic league appearances and goals as of 20 September 2024 ‡ National team caps and goals as of 20 July 2023

Marine Alfreda Marie Madeleine Dafeur (born 20 October 1994) is a professional footballer who plays as a left back and left midfielder for Bristol City. Born in France, she originally represented her country of birth at youth and senior levels, but ultimately went to debut for the Algeria national team.

== International career ==
Born in France, Dafeur is of Algerian and French descent and holds dual nationality. In 2023, Dafeur, who had previously played for the French team, decided to switch her allegiance and joined Algeria. As a result, she was called for a training camp with the Algerian team from February 13 to 21, 2023.

Scores and results list Algeria's goal tally first, score column indicates score after each Dafeur goal.

List of international goals scored by Marine Dafeur
| No. | Date | Venue | Opponent | Score | Result | Competition |
|---|---|---|---|---|---|---|
| 1 | 9 April 2023 | Nelson Mandela Stadium, Algiers, Algeria | Tanzania | 1–0 | 4–0 | International Friendly |
| 2 | 14 July 2023 | Stade Lat-Dior, Thiès, Senegal | Senegal | 1–1 | 1–3 | International Friendly |
| 3 | 27 February 2024 | Nelson Mandela Stadium, Algiers, Algeria | Burkina Faso | 2–0 | 3–0 | International Friendly |
| 4 | 23 October 2025 | Miloud Hadefi Stadium, Oran, Algeria | Cameroon | 2–0 | 2–1 | 2026 Women's Africa Cup of Nations qualification |
| 5 | 28 October 2025 | Stade de la Réunification, Douala, Cameroon | Cameroon | 1–0 | 1–0 | 2026 Women's Africa Cup of Nations qualification |
| 6 | 26 July 2026 | Rabat Olympic Stadium, Rabat, Morocco | Senegal | 1–0 | 2–0 | 2026 Women's Africa Cup of Nations |
| 7 | 3 August 2026 | Rabat Olympic Stadium, Rabat, Morocco | Kenya | 1–0 | 2–0 | 2026 Women's Africa Cup of Nations |
| 8 | 9 October 2026 | 5 July 1962 Stadium, Algiers, Algeria | Central African Republic | 2–0 | 8–0 | 2028 CAF Women's Olympic qualifying tournament |
| 9 | 13 October 2026 | Hocine Aït Ahmed Stadium, Tizi Ouzou, Algeria | Central African Republic | 3–0 | 7–0 | 2028 CAF Women's Olympic qualifying tournament |
