= RC Lens Féminin =

French women's football team, based in Lens

Racing Club de Lens Féminin
- Founded: 2001; 25 years ago (as Arras); 2020; 6 years ago (as RC Lens)
- Manager: Sarah M'Barek
- League: Seconde Ligue
- 2025–26: Première Ligue, 11th of 12 (relegated)
- Website: https://www.rclens.fr/fr/equipe-feminine-rclensfeminin

Racing Club de Lens Féminin is a French football club that competes in the Seconde Ligue. The club was founded in 2001 as Arras Football Association, and was renamed Arras Football Club Féminin in 2011.

== History ==
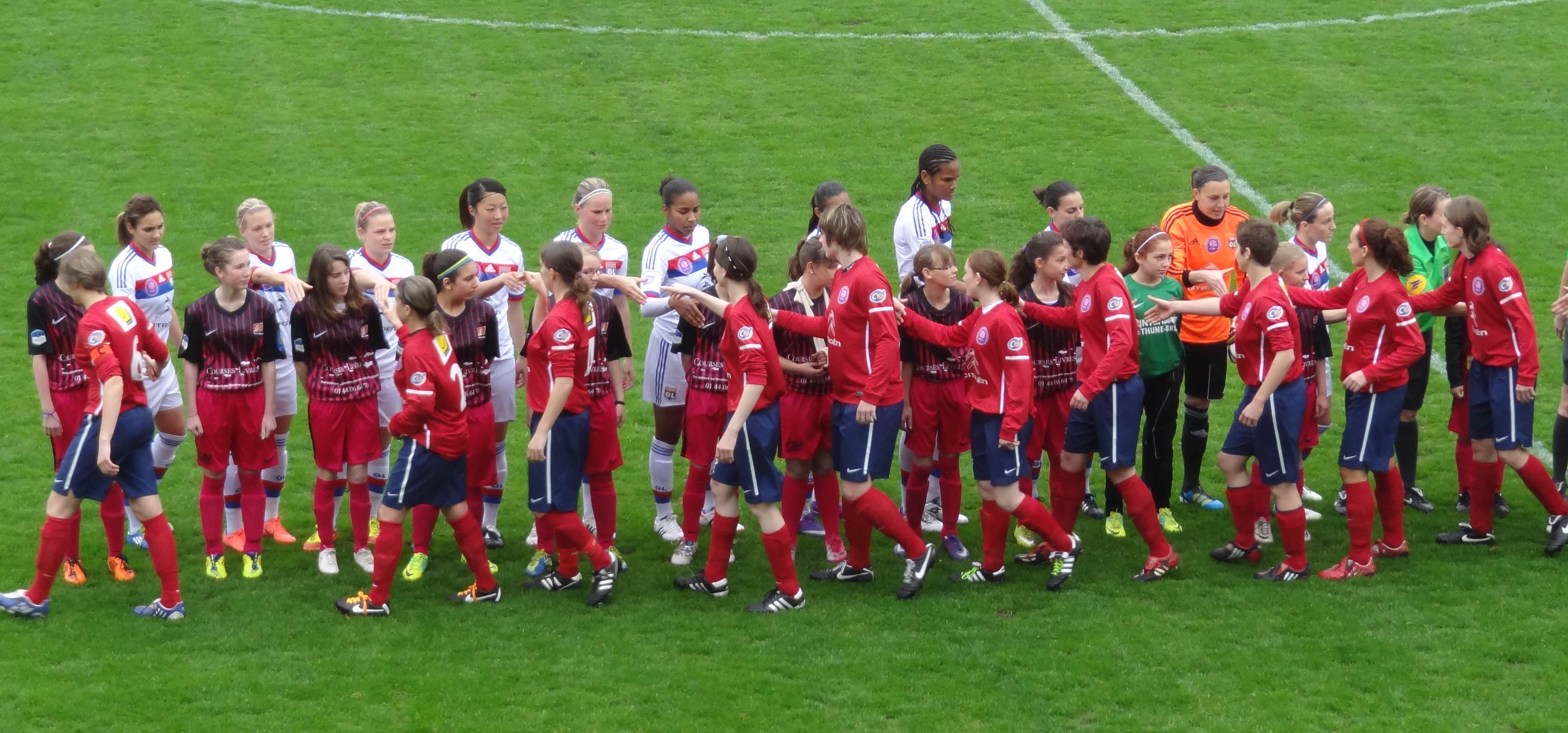
Arras FCF players during their 2011–12 Coupe de France Féminine match against Lyon.

Arras Football Club Féminin was founded in 2001, as the women's department of Arras FA. In 2002, Arras won their regional championship, and were promoted to Division 3 Féminine. In 2009–10, Arras won the Division 3 Group C title, and were promoted to Division 2 Féminine. In 2011, the club renamed itself Arras Football Club Féminin (Arras FCF), after becoming a separate team from Arras FA.

In the 2011–2012 Division 2 Féminine season, Arras FCF won promotion to the Division 1 Féminine. They also reached the semi-finals of the 2011–12 Coupe de France Féminine, the team's best performance in the competition. Arras were later relegated from Division 1 Féminine in the 2014–15 season. They finished second in Division 2 Féminine in 2015–2016, third in 2016–2017, sixth in 2017–2018, and eighth in 2018–2019. Arras finished ninth in the 2019–2020 Division 2 Féminine, before the season was halted due to the COVID-19 pandemic.

In 2019, a deal between Arras and Racing Club de Lens was agreed to allow Arras to train once a week at Lens' La Gaillette stadium. In 2020, the club was taken over by Racing Club de Lens, in a merger/adoption deal. The team took the Lens name, and kept the badge of Arras on player jerseys alongside the Lens badge. The team now trains most of the time at La Gaillette, although sometimes at Arras, and matches are played in both locations. As part of the move, Sarah M'Barek was announced as the team's new manager. Lens announced that most of the Arras players would be kept after the takeover, and the club made eight signings in the summer 2020 transfer window. Prior to the deal, Lens were one of six professional men's clubs without a women's team.

Lens finished second in the 2024–25 Seconde Ligue, and as such were promoted to the Première Ligue for the 2025–26 season.

== Current squad ==
As of 10 August 2026

Note: Flags indicate national team as defined under FIFA eligibility rules; some limited exceptions apply. Players may hold more than one non-FIFA nationality.

| No. | Pos. | Nation | Player |
|---|---|---|---|
| 1 | GK | USA | Maddy Anderson |
| 2 | DF | FRA | Fany Proniez |
| 3 | DF | HAI | Jennyfer Limage |
| 4 | DF | ALG | Sofia Guellati |
| 5 | DF | FRA | Romane Lejeune |
| 6 | MF | FRA | Tess David (captain) |
| 7 | FW | BEN | Aude Gbedjissi |
| 8 | MF | CAN | Asma Merzougui |
| 9 | FW | HAI | Sherly Jeudy |
| 11 | FW | MAR | Kaîna El Koumir |
| 13 | DF | FRA | Manon Revelli |
| 14 | MF | FRA | Laurine Pinot |
| 15 | FW | FRA | Naomie Vagre |

| No. | Pos. | Nation | Player |
|---|---|---|---|
| 18 | MF | FRA | Julia Evrard |
| 19 | MF | HAI | Dayana Pierre-Louis |
| 20 | MF | FRA | Clara Bertrand |
| 21 | MF | FRA | Alizée Mereau |
| 22 | MF | ALG | Emma Smaali |
| 23 | MF | FRA | Lizzy Millequant |
| 24 | FW | FRA | Louann Archier |
| 25 | DF | FRA | Laureen Oillic |
| 26 | MF | FRA | Carla Polito |
| 28 | DF | FRA | Jennifer Meunier |
| 29 | DF | FRA | Emmy Jézéquel |
| 30 | GK | FRA | Blandine Joly |
| — | MF | FRA | Fanny Rossi |
