= Radia Fertoul =

Algerian football player and manager

Personal information
- Date of birth: 18 December 1974 (age 51)
- Place of birth: Constantine, Algeria
- Position: Midfielder

International career
Years	Team	Apps	(Gls)
1998	Algeria	1	(0)

Managerial career
- 1998–2000: MBC Constantine
- 2000–2004: FC Béjaia
- 2004–2018: FC Constantine
- 2018: Algeria
- 2021–2022: Algeria
- 2022–2023: CS Constantine
- 2023–: Al-Amal

Radia Fertoul (Arabic: راضية فرتول; born 18 December 1974) is an Algerian professional football manager and former player who played as a midfielder. She was also an international player, playing the first-ever match of the Algeria national team in 1998.

== Playing career ==
On 5 July 1997, Fertoul played at the 5 July 1962 Stadium in a match between two regional teams, serving as the opening act for the final of the men's Algerian Cup. This event was well received by the public and led to the formation of the Algeria women's national football team, of which she would become the captain. On 14 May 1998, she played in the team's first official match, a 14–0 defeat against France.

== Coaching career ==
Fertoul founded Algeria's first women's football club in 1998, the women's section of Mechaâl Boudraâ Salah of Constantine (MBSC). with whom she reached the final of the Algerian Women's Cup before being dissolved due to a lack of resources. She then joined FC Béjaïa for four years.

She then founded the women's football club Filles de la Concorde de Constantine in 2004. she guided the team to victory in the Algerian Women's Championship in 2018.

She served as the assistant coach of the Algeria women's junior team from 2007 to 2010 and was appointed assistant coach of the senior women's national team in 2008. On 29 August 2018, she was appointed head coach of the Algerisenior team, succeeding Azzedine Chih. She thus became the first woman to be the head coach of a national football team in the Arab world. She led Algeria in the 2018 Women's Africa Cup of Nations, where the team was eliminated in the group stage. As a result, she was dismissed from her position by the Algerian Football Federation on 25 December 2018. However, She remained the president of the Women's Football Commission of the Federation while continuing to serve as the coach of FC Constantine.

In 2020, the Confederation of African Football appointed Fertoul as a regional women's instructor. She resumed the role of head coach in 2021 and led Algeria to the semi-finals of the 2021 Arab Women's Cup. She got sacked back after failing to qualify for the 2022 Women's Africa Cup of Nations.

In September 2023, Saudi Women's First Division League club, Al-Amal appointed her as the head coach. She successfully guided the team to a historic promotion to the Premier League.
