= Le Mans FC (women) =

Women's football club in Le Mans, France

Le Mans
- Full name: Le Mans Football Club women's section
- Nicknames: Les Sang et Or (The Blood and Golds)
- Founded: 1983
- Ground: Complexe de la Californie
- Capacity: 400
- Coach: Damien Bollini
- League: Seconde Ligue
- 2025–26: Seconde Ligue, 3rd of 12
Home colours	Away colours

Le Mans Football Club (French: Le Mans Football Club féminines) commonly referred to as Le Mans FC or simply Le Mans, is a women's football club based in Le Mans, France. It's the women's section of Le Mans FC. Coached by Damien Bollini, the club competes in the Seconde Ligue.

== History ==
In 2001, the name "Le Mans Union Club 72" was officially granted to the women's team, responding to the players' request for greater recognition and the necessity of establishing a women's section within the club, as is typical in professional football clubs.

In the 2021–22 season, the team had an outstanding year, finishing unbeaten in their Regional 1 campaign with 20 wins from 20 matches. They also won the Pays-de-la-Loire Cup. In the Division 2 promotion playoffs, they defeated CPB Bréquigny (6–1 on aggregate) and SM Caen (3–2), earning promotion to Division 2.

== Players ==
=== Current squad ===
As of 3 November 2024.

Note: Flags indicate national team as defined under FIFA eligibility rules; some limited exceptions apply. Players may hold more than one non-FIFA nationality.

No.	Pos.	Nation	Player
4	DF	FRA	Valentine Roger
5	DF	FRA	Émilie Giffaut
6	MF	COD	Esther Siluvangi
7	MF	TUN	Sana Guermazi
8	MF	FRA	Chloé Philippe
9	MF	MTQ	Maëva Salomon
10	MF	FRA	Anaïs Gasnier
11	MF	ALG	Mélinne D'Oria
12	DF	NCL	Marie-Laure Palene
13	DF	FRA	Kate Nado
14	FW	FRA	Madison Henry
16	GK	FRA	Marine Bosse
19	FW	FRA	Madeleine Yetna
20	FW	FRA	Romane Leveau

No.	Pos.	Nation	Player
21	MF	ALG	Nassima Bekhti
23	MF	FRA	Zoé Bouron
25	MF	FRA	Angélique Huet
26	MF	FRA	Marie Oger
27	FW	FRA	Charlotte Faity
28	DF	FRA	Chloé Bourdoiseau
29	MF	FRA	Merya Garel
30	GK	FRA	Jade Dumas
33	FW	FRA	Jalia Chabourine
34	FW	FRA	Lya Galodé
40	GK	FRA	Naffissatouba Camara
93	MF	ALG	Wissem Bouzid
—	DF	JPN	Chinatsu Shidara
—	MF	FRA	Mathilde Micetic

== Current staff ==
As of 31 July 2024

Position	Name
Head coach	(France) Damien Bollini
Assistant coach	(France) Cédric Brement
Goalkeeper coach	(France) Thibaut Ferrand
Physical Trainers	(France) Corentin Hulo
Video Analyst	(France) Edouard Landeroin
