= Farid Benstiti =

Football player and manager (born 1967)

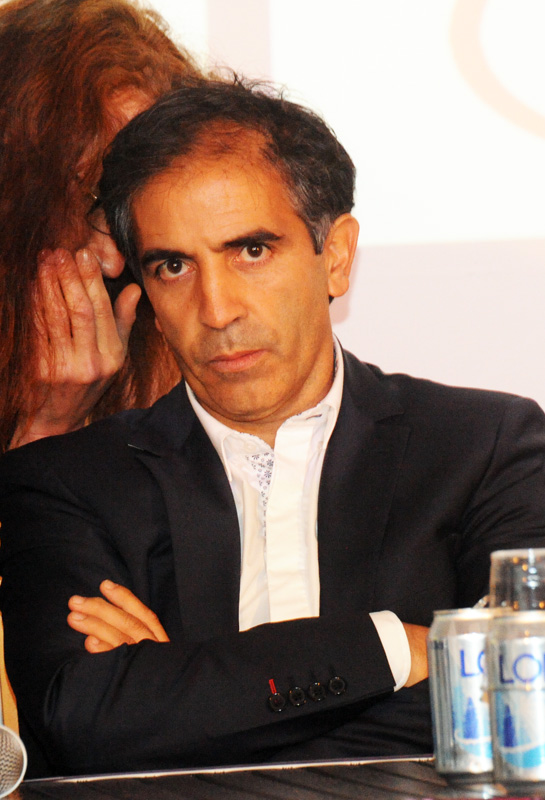
- Benstiti in October 2013

Personal information
- Full name: Farid Benstiti
- Date of birth: 16 January 1967 (age 59)
- Place of birth: Lyon, France
- Position: Midfielder

Senior career*
Years	Team	Apps	(Gls)
1984–1989	Lyon	18	(1)
1989–1990	Cercle Dijon	8	(2)
1990–1992	Lyon-Duchère		
1992–1993	Avenir Lembeek		
1993–1995	Sète		
1995–1997	Lyon-Duchère		
1998–1999	FC Vaulx-en-Velin		
1999–2000	Gap		

Managerial career
- 2001–2010: Lyon (women)
- 2011–2012: Russia (women)
- 2012: Rossiyanka
- 2012–2016: Paris Saint-Germain (women)
- 2017–2019: Dalian Quanjian
- 2020–2021: OL Reign
- 2022–: Algeria (women)
- * Club domestic league appearances and goals

Farid Benstiti (born 16 January 1967) is a French-Algerian football coach and former player who played as a midfielder. He currently manages the Algeria women's national team. He has also managed clubs such as Olympique Lyonnais, Paris Saint-Germain, Dalian Quanjian and OL Reign.

== Playing career ==
Benstiti started his playing career in 1984 for Olympique Lyonnais. In 1989, he moved to Cercle Dijon, and he subsequently played for AS Lyon-Duchère, FC Sète and Avenir Lembeek in the French and Belgian third tiers, and Vaulx-en-Velin and Gap FC in lower categories. He retired in 2000 at 33.

== Managerial career ==
Benstiti is best known for his managerial career in women's football, which started in 2001 as he was appointed Olympique Lyonnais' manager. Under Benstiti Olympique won four championships in a row between 2007 and 2010 and reached the 2010 Champions League's final, lost to Turbine Potsdam on penalties. However, he left the position after the 2010 season. In September 2011 he signed for the Russian national team and months later he also took charge of Russian champion WFC Rossiyanka, replacing Vera Pauw and Tatiana Egorova respectively. In July 2012 he left both positions and returned to France for personal reasons. He then signed for Paris Saint-Germain.

On 22 December 2016, Chinese club Dalian Quanjian officially signed Benstiti as their new manager.

=== OL Reign ===
On 17 January 2020, Benstiti was appointed the head coach of Reign FC. He resigned on 2 July 2021; Benstiti was later named in the Yates Report for abusive behavior regarding weight-shaming players.

=== Algeria women's NT ===
On 2022, he signed as a manager with the Algerian women's national team.
