= Seconde Ligue =

Women's association football league in France

- Organising body: LFFP
- Founded: 1982; 44 years ago
- Country: France
- Confederation: UEFA
- Number of clubs: 12
- Level on pyramid: 2
- Promotion to: Première Ligue
- Relegation to: Division 3 Féminine
- Domestic cups: Coupe de France Féminine; Trophée des Championnes
- Current champions: Les Marseillaises (2nd title) (2024–25)
- Most championships: FC Vendenheim (3 titles)
- Current: 2025–26 Seconde Ligue

The Seconde Ligue (French pronunciation: [səɡɔ̃d liɡ]) is a professional women's association football league at the second level of the French football league system, and is run by the Ligue féminine de football professionnel (LFFP). Its annual competition features twelve teams playing two series of round-robin matches from September to June. At the end of each season, the top two teams are promoted to the top-level Première Ligue, while the bottom two teams are relegated to the third-tier, semi-professional Division 3 Féminine.

== History ==
Before the beginning of the 2024–25 season, the league's name changed from Division 2 to Seconde Ligue.

== Clubs ==
Team	Location	Stadium	Capacity	2024–25 season
AJ Auxerre	Auxerre	Stade de l'Abbé-Deschamps	18,541	D3, 1st (of 24) ▲
EA Guingamp	Saint-Brieuc	Complexe Sportif Akademi EAG 1		PL, 12th (of 12) ▼
FC Metz	Metz	Stade Dezavelle	1,500	6th (of 11)
Grenoble Foot 38	Grenoble	Stade Stijovic N°1		D3, 2nd (of 24) ▲
Le Mans FC	Le Mans	Parc des Sports La Californie 1		4th (of 11)
LOSC Lille	Lille	Stadium Terrain N°1		7th (of 11)
OGC Nice	Nice	Stade de la Plaine du Var N°1	1,000	9th (of 11)
Rodez AF	Rodez	Stade Paul-Lignon	5,955	10th (of 11)
Stade de Reims	Reims	Stade Blériot 2	1,000	PL, 11th (of 12) ▼
Thonon Evian GG FC	Ambilly	Stade Joseph-Moynat 1		8th (of 11)
Toulouse FC	Toulouse	Parc des Sports Stadium A1	1,000	3rd (of 11)
US Saint-Malo	Saint-Malo	Stade de Marville 1		5th (of 11)

== Champions ==
#	Season	Champions	Runners-up	Top goalscorer	
#	Season	Champions	Runners-up	Player(s)	Goals
Division 2
1	1982–83	FCF Condéen	Paris Saint-Germain FC		
2	1983–84	US Le Neubourg	AS Saint-Quentin		
3	1984–85	FC Boran-sur-Oise	Paris Saint-Germain FC		
4	1985–86	US Villaines-la-Juhel	FCF Juvisy		
National 1B
5	1992–93	OS Monaco	Stade quimpérois		
6	1993–94	Toulouse OAC	US Orléans		
7	1994–95	Caluire SCSC	US Mans		
8	1995–96	ESOF La Roche-sur-Yon	US Bruay-La Buissière		
9	1996–97	Montpellier Le Crès	Stade quimpérois		
10	1997–98	SC Saint-Clair Caluire	Croix Blanche Angers		
11	1998–99	Saint-Memmie Olympique	Stade quimpérois		
12	1999–00	SC Schiltigheim	ES Cormelles-le-Royal		
13	2000–01	Paris Saint-Germain FC	Caluire SCSC		
14	2001–02	US Bruay-La Buissière	Stade quimpérois		
Division 2
15	2002–03	FCF Hénin-Beaumont	US Compiègne		
16	2003–04	FC Vendenheim	FCF Condéen		
17	2004–05	US Compiègne	ESOF La Roche-sur-Yon		
18	2005–06	FCF Condéen	Stade Briochin		
19	2006–07	FC Vendenheim	RC Saint-Étienne	(France) Corinne Lebailly (Vendenheim)	25
20	2007–08	FCF Nord Allier Yzeure	FCF Condéen	(France) Lilas Traïkia (ASPTT Albi)	21
21	2008–09	ESOF La Roche-sur-Yon	Montigny AS	(France) Marine Augis (Tours)	25
22	2009–10	Rodez AF	Le Mans	(France) Sarah Palacin (FF Issy)	25
23	2010–11	FC Vendenheim	AS Muret	(France) Fanny Tenret (Muretaine)	25
24	2011–12	Toulouse	Arras FCF	(France) Sandra Maurice (Toulouse)	28
25	2012–13	FCF Hénin-Beaumont	ASJ Soyaux-Charente	(France) Fanny Tenret (Muretaine)	30
26	2013–14	ASPTT Albi	AS Algrange	(France) Valérie Gauvin Toulouse	32
27	2014–15	VGA Saint-Maur	ESOF La Roche-sur-Yon	(Cameroon) Marlyse Ngo (Saint-Maur)	43
28	2015–16	Olympique de Marseille	FC Metz	(France) Sarah Cambot (Bordeaux) (France) Laury Jesus (Grenoble)	24
29	2016–17	Lille OSC	FC Fleury 91	(Belgium) Jana Coryn (Lille)	23
30	2017–18	FC Metz	Dijon FCO	(Cameroon) Marlyse Ngo (Nancy-Lorraine)	28
31	2018–19	Stade de Reims	Olympique de Marseille	(France) Kelly Gago (Saint-Étienne)	20
32	2019–20	No titles were awarded as the competition was suspended due to the COVID-19 pandemic			
33	2020–21	No titles were awarded as the competition was suspended due to the COVID-19 pandemic			
34	2021–22	Rodez AF	Le Havre AC	(France) Sarah Palacin (Nice)	18
35	2022–23	AS Saint-Étienne	Lille OSC	(Turkey) Selen Altunkulak (Toulouse) (Senegal) Mama Diop (Marseille)	20
36	2023–24	RC Strasbourg	FC Nantes	(Benin) Aude Gbedjissi (Lens)	14
Seconde Ligue
37	2024–25	Olympique de Marseille	RC Lens	(Benin) Aude Gbedjissi (Lens)	15
