= 2022–23 Arsenal W.F.C. season =

English women's football club season

Arsenal Women
2022–23 season
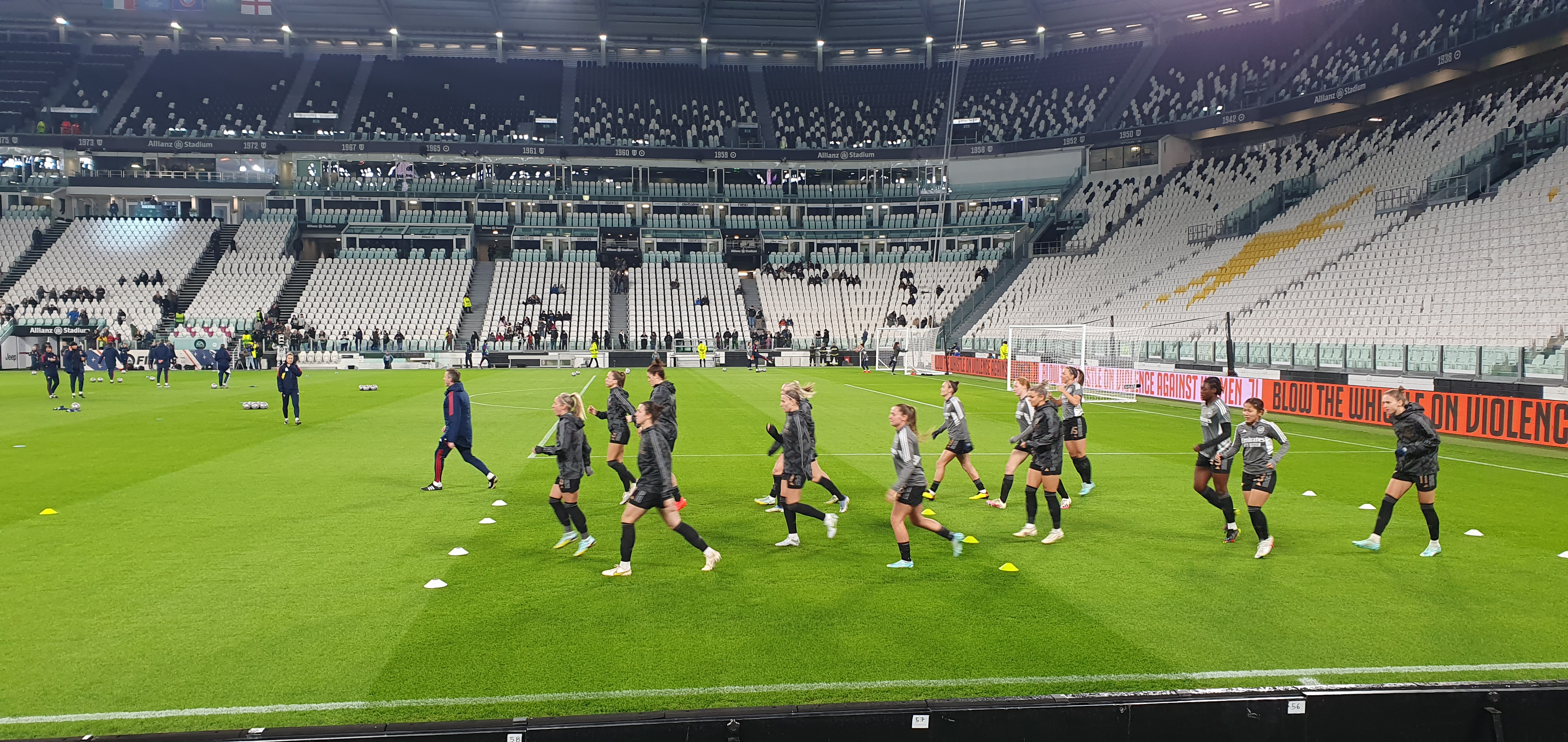
- Arsenal players warming up in Turin for the Champions League match against Juventus on 24 November 2022
- Owner: Kroenke Sports & Entertainment
- Manager: Jonas Eidevall
- Stadium: Meadow Park; Emirates Stadium (Select home games)
- Super League: 3rd
- FA Cup: Fifth round
- League Cup: Winners
- Champions League: Semi-finals
- Top goalscorer: League: Frida Maanum (9); All: Stina Blackstenius (18)
- Highest home attendance: 60,063 (vs VfL Wolfsburg, Champions League, 1 May 2023)
- Lowest home attendance: 1,795 (vs Manchester City, League Cup, 8 February 2023)
- Average home league attendance: 15,046
- Biggest win: 9–0 (vs Leeds United (H), FA Cup, 29 January 2023)
- Biggest defeat: 0–2 (vs Chelsea (A), FA Cup, 26 February 2023); 0–2 (vs Chelsea (A), WSL, 21 May 2023); 0–2 (vs Aston Villa (H), 27 May 2023)
Home colours	Away colours	Third colours
- All statistics correct as of 27 May 2023.

The 2022–23 season was Arsenal Women's Football Club's 36th season of competitive football. The club participated in the Women's Super League, FA Cup and the Champions League where they reached the semi-finals. This match represented an historic day in the club's history where they sold out the Emirates Stadium for the first time. They also won the League Cup for the 6th time, their first piece of silverware since winning the 2018–19 WSL.

== Squad information & statistics ==
Statistics as of 27 May 2023.

=== First team squad ===
No.	Name	Date of birth (age)	Since	Last Contract	Signed from
Goalkeepers
1	(Austria) Manuela Zinsberger	19 October 1995 (aged 27)	2019	February 2021	(Germany) Bayern Munich
14	(Canada) Sabrina D'Angelo	11 May 1993 (aged 30)	2023	January 2023	(Sweden) Vittsjö GIK
18	(United States) Kaylan Marckese	22 April 1998 (aged 25)	2022	July 2022	(Denmark) HB Køge
Defenders
2	(Brazil) Rafaelle Souza	18 June 1991 (aged 32)	2022	January 2022	(China) Changchun Zhuoyue
3	(England) Lotte Wubben-Moy	11 January 1999 (aged 24)	2020	September 2020	(United States) University of North Carolina
5	(Scotland) Jen Beattie	13 May 1991 (aged 32)	2019	June 2019	(England) Manchester City
6	(England) Leah Williamson	29 March 1997 (aged 26)	2014	June 2021	(England) Arsenal Academy
7	(Australia) Steph Catley	26 January 1994 (aged 29)	2020	May 2022	(Australia) Melbourne City
16	(Switzerland) Noelle Maritz	23 December 1995 (aged 27)	2020	May 2022	(Germany) VfL Wolfsburg
26	(Austria) Laura Wienroither	13 January 1999 (aged 24)	2022	January 2022	(Germany) TSG Hoffenheim
29	(England) Teyah Goldie	27 June 2004 (aged 19)	2021	June 2022	(England) Arsenal Academy
Midfielders
8	(England) Jordan Nobbs	8 December 1992 (aged 30)	2010	April 2020	(England) Sunderland
10	(Scotland) Kim Little (c)	29 June 1990 (aged 33)	2016	April 2023	(United States) Seattle Reign
12	(Norway) Frida Maanum	16 July 1999 (aged 23)	2021	July 2021	(Sweden) Linköpings FC
13	(Switzerland) Lia Wälti	19 April 1993 (aged 30)	2018	May 2023	(Germany) Turbine Potsdam
21	(Netherlands) Victoria Pelova	3 June 1999 (aged 24)	2023	January 2023	(Netherlands) Ajax
22	(Denmark) Kathrine Møller Kühl	5 July 2003 (aged 19)	2023	January 2023	(Denmark) Nordsjælland
56	(England) Freya Godfrey	7 May 2005 (aged 18)	2023		(England) Arsenal Academy
Forwards
9	(England) Beth Mead	9 May 1995 (aged 28)	2017	December 2022	(England) Sunderland
11	(Netherlands) Vivianne Miedema	15 July 1996 (aged 26)	2017	May 2022	(Germany) Bayern Munich
15	(Republic of Ireland) Katie McCabe	21 September 1995 (aged 27)	2015	May 2021	(Republic of Ireland) Shelbourne
17	(Sweden) Lina Hurtig	5 September 1995 (aged 27)	2022	August 2022	(Italy) Juventus
19	(Australia) Caitlin Foord	11 November 1994 (aged 28)	2020	May 2022	(Australia) Sydney FC
20	(Brazil) Giovana Queiroz	21 June 2003 (aged 20)	2022	September 2022	(Spain) Barcelona
23	(Japan) Mana Iwabuchi	18 March 1993 (aged 30)	2021	May 2021	(England) Aston Villa
25	(Sweden) Stina Blackstenius	5 February 1996 (aged 27)	2022	January 2022	(Sweden) BK Häcken
27	(England) Jodie Taylor	17 May 1986 (aged 37)	2023	March 2023	(United States) San Diego Wave
59	(England) Michelle Agyemang	3 February 2006 (aged 17)	2022		(England) Arsenal Academy

=== Appearances and goals ===
No.	Name	Super League		FA Cup		League Cup		UWCL		Total	
No.	Name	Apps	Goals	Apps	Goals	Apps	Goals	Apps	Goals	Apps	Goals
Goalkeepers
1	(Austria) Manuela Zinsberger	18	0	1	0	1	0	11	0	31	0
14	(Canada) Sabrina D'Angelo	4	0	0	0	2	0	0	0	6	0
18	(United States) Kaylan Marckese	0	0	1	0	0	0	1	0	2	0
Defenders
2	(Brazil) Rafaelle Souza	15+1	2	1	0	3	0	7+2	1	26+3	3
3	(England) Lotte Wubben-Moy	18+3	1	0+2	0	2	0	8+2	0	28+7	1
5	(Scotland) Jen Beattie	6+7	0	1	1	0+2	0	3+4	1	10+13	2
6	(England) Leah Williamson	10+2	1	2	0	3	0	7	0	22+2	1
7	(Australia) Steph Catley	12+5	1	2	0	1+2	0	10	0	25+7	1
16	(Switzerland) Noelle Maritz	13+4	0	0+1	0	2+1	0	7+1	0	22+7	0
26	(Austria) Laura Wienroither	11+6	1	2	0	1+1	0	6+3	0	20+10	1
29	(England) Teyah Goldie	0+1	0	0	0	0	0	0	0	0+1	0
Midfielders
8	(England) Jordan Nobbs	2+7	2	0	0	0	0	2+3	1	4+10	3
10	(Scotland) Kim Little (c)	11	4	2	1	3	1	6+1	2	22+1	8
12	(Norway) Frida Maanum	19+3	9	1+1	0	3	2	9+2	5	32+6	16
13	(Switzerland) Lia Wälti	17+1	1	1	0	1	0	11	0	30+1	1
21	(Netherlands) Victoria Pelova	10+2	1	1+1	1	1+2	0	3+1	0	15+6	2
22	(Denmark) Kathrine Møller Kühl	4+7	0	1+1	1	1+1	0	0+3	0	6+12	1
56	(England) Freya Godfrey	0+2	0	0	1	0	0	0	0	0+2	0
Forwards
9	(England) Beth Mead	7	3	0	0	0	0	3+1	2	10+1	5
11	(Netherlands) Vivianne Miedema	5+3	4	0	0	0	0	6+1	3	11+4	7
15	(Republic of Ireland) Katie McCabe	18+3	3	2	0	3	0	10+2	0	33+5	3
17	(Sweden) Lina Hurtig	2+7	0	0+1	1	1+1	0	2+5	2	5+14	3
19	(Australia) Caitlin Foord	18+1	6	2	1	3	1	8+1	4	31+2	12
20	(Brazil) Giovana Queiroz	0+11	0	1	0	0	0	0	0	1+11	0
23	(Japan) Mana Iwabuchi	0+3	0	0	0	0	0	1+1	1	1+4	1
25	(Sweden) Stina Blackstenius	20+2	8	1+1	2	2+1	2	11+1	6	34+5	18
27	(England) Jodie Taylor	2+6	0	0	0	0	0	0	0	2+6	0
59	(England) Michelle Agyemang	0+3	0	0+1	1	0	0	0+1	0	0+5	1

=== Goalscorers ===
Rank	No.	Position	Name	Super League	FA Cup	League Cup	UWCL	Total
1	25	FW	(Sweden) Stina Blackstenius	8	2	2	6	18
2	12	MF	(Norway) Frida Maanum	9	0	2	5	16
3	19	FW	(Australia) Caitlin Foord	6	1	1	4	12
4	10	MF	(Scotland) Kim Little	4	1	1	2	8
5	11	FW	(Netherlands) Vivianne Miedema	4	0	0	3	7
6	9	FW	(England) Beth Mead	3	0	0	2	5
7	2	DF	(Brazil) Rafaelle Souza	2	0	0	1	3
7	8	MF	(England) Jordan Nobbs	2	0	0	1	3
7	15	FW	(Republic of Ireland) Katie McCabe	3	0	0	0	3
7	17	FW	(Sweden) Lina Hurtig	0	1	0	2	3
11	5	DF	(Scotland) Jen Beattie	0	1	0	1	2
11	21	MF	(Netherlands) Victoria Pelova	1	1	0	0	2
13	3	DF	(England) Lotte Wubben-Moy	1	0	0	0	1
13	6	DF	(England) Leah Williamson	1	0	0	0	1
13	7	DF	(Australia) Steph Catley	1	0	0	0	1
13	13	MF	(Switzerland) Lia Wälti	1	0	0	0	1
13	22	MF	(Denmark) Kathrine Møller Kühl	0	1	0	0	1
13	23	FW	(Japan) Mana Iwabuchi	0	0	0	1	1
13	26	DF	(Austria) Laura Wienroither	1	0	0	0	1
13	59	FW	(England) Michelle Agyemang	0	1	0	0	1
Own goal				2	0	1	0	3
Total				49	9	7	28	93

=== Disciplinary record ===
Rank	No.	Position	Name	Super League		FA Cup		League Cup		UWCL		Total	
Rank	No.	Position	Name	Booked	Sent off (straight red)	Booked	Sent off (straight red)	Booked	Sent off (straight red)	Booked	Sent off (straight red)	Booked	Sent off (straight red)
1	15	FW	(Republic of Ireland) Katie McCabe	7	0	0	0	2	0	2	0	11	0
2	19	FW	(Australia) Caitlin Foord	3	0	0	0	2	0	1	0	6	0
3	16	DF	(Switzerland) Noelle Maritz	1	0	1	0	1	0	2	0	5	0
4	3	DF	(England) Lotte Wubben-Moy	1	0	0	0	1	0	1	0	3	0
5	2	DF	(Brazil) Rafaelle Souza	0	0	0	0	1	0	1	0	2	0
5	13	MF	(Switzerland) Lia Wälti	1	0	0	0	0	0	1	0	2	0
5	20	FW	(Brazil) Giovana Queiroz	2	0	0	0	0	0	0	0	2	0
8	5	DF	(Scotland) Jen Beattie	0	0	0	0	0	0	1	0	1	0
8	7	DF	(Australia) Steph Catley	0	0	0	0	0	0	1	0	1	0
8	9	FW	(England) Beth Mead	0	0	0	0	0	0	1	0	1	0
8	10	MF	(Scotland) Kim Little	0	0	0	0	1	0	0	0	1	0
8	12	MF	(Norway) Frida Maanum	1	0	0	0	0	0	0	0	1	0
8	21	MF	(Netherlands) Victoria Pelova	0	0	0	0	0	0	1	0	1	0
8	25	FW	(Sweden) Stina Blackstenius	0	0	0	0	0	0	1	0	1	0
8	27	FW	(England) Jodie Taylor	1	0	0	0	0	0	0	0	1	0
Total				17	0	1	0	8	0	13	0	39	0

=== Clean sheets ===
Rank	No.	Name	Super League	FA Cup	League Cup	UWCL	Total
1	1	(Austria) Manuela Zinsberger	10	0	0	3	13
2	14	(Canada) Sabrina D'Angelo	1	0	2	0	3
3	18	(United States) Kaylan Marckese	0	1	0	0	1
Total			11	1	2	3	17

== Transfers, loans, and other signings ==
=== Transfers in ===
Announcement date	No.	Position	Player	From club
25 July 2022	18	GK	(United States) Kaylan Marckese	(Denmark) HB Køge
18 August 2022	17	FW	(Sweden) Lina Hurtig	(Italy) Juventus
12 September 2022	20	FW	(Brazil) Gio Queiroz	(Spain) Barcelona
6 January 2023	21	MF	(Netherlands) Victoria Pelova	(Netherlands) Ajax
7 January 2023	22	MF	(Denmark) Kathrine Møller Kühl	(Denmark) Nordsjælland
13 January 2023	14	GK	(Canada) Sabrina D'Angelo	(Sweden) Vittsjö GIK
17 March 2023	27	FW	(England) Jodie Taylor	(United States) San Diego Wave

=== Contract extensions ===
Announcement date	No.	Position	Player	At Arsenal since
5 May 2022	7	DF	(Australia) Steph Catley	2020
6 May 2022	Coach		(Sweden) Jonas Eidevall	2021
11 May 2022	16	DF	(Switzerland) Noelle Maritz	2020
21 May 2022	11	FW	(Netherlands) Vivianne Miedema	2017
30 May 2022	19	FW	(Australia) Caitlin Foord	2020
16 December 2022	9	FW	(England) Beth Mead	2017
18 April 2023	10	MF	(Scotland) Kim Little	2016
11 May 2023	13	MF	(Switzerland) Lia Wälti	2018

=== Transfers out ===
Announcement date	No.	Position	Player	To club
28 April 2022	77	FW	(United States) Tobin Heath	(United States) OL Reign
31 May 2022	17	FW	(Scotland) Lisa Evans	(England) West Ham United
1 June 2022	22	DF	(Austria) Viktoria Schnaderbeck	Retired
11 July 2022	18	GK	(Australia) Lydia Williams	(France) Paris Saint-Germain
14 July 2022	20	DF	(Denmark) Simone Boye Sørensen	(Sweden) Hammarby
6 August 2022	14	FW	(England) Nikita Parris	(England) Manchester United
5 January 2023	8	MF	(England) Jordan Nobbs	(England) Aston Villa

=== Loans out ===
Announcement date	No.	Position	Player	To club
7 July 2022	4	DF	(England) Anna Patten	(England) Aston Villa
27 July 2022	24	GK	(England) Fran Stenson	(England) Birmingham City
12 September 2022	20	FW	(Brazil) Gio Queiroz	(England) Everton
18 January 2023	23	FW	(Japan) Mana Iwabuchi	(England) Tottenham Hotspur

== Current injuries ==
No.	Position	Player	Injury	Last game	Estimated return
6	DF	(England) Leah Williamson	ACL rupture	v. (England) Manchester United, 19 April 2023	N/A
9	FW	(England) Beth Mead	ACL rupture	v. (England) Manchester United, 19 November 2022	N/A
10	MF	(Scotland) Kim Little	Hamstring injury	v. (Germany) Bayern Munich, 29 March 2023	N/A
11	FW	(Netherlands) Vivianne Miedema	ACL rupture	v. (France) Lyon, 15 December 2022	N/A
26	DF	(Austria) Laura Wienroither	ACL rupture	v. (Germany) VfL Wolfsburg, 1 May 2023	N/A

== Suspensions ==
No.	Position	Player	Games suspended	Reason
15	FW	(Republic of Ireland) Katie McCabe	v. Manchester United, 19 April 2023	Yellow card accumulation

== Club ==
=== Kits ===
Supplier: Adidas / Sponsor: Fly Emirates / Sleeve sponsor: Visit Rwanda

Home	Home (2023-24)	Away	Third	"No More Red"	Goalkeeper^{1}	Goalkeeper^{2}	Goalkeeper^{3}

=== Kit information ===
This is Adidas's fourth year supplying Arsenal kit, having taken over from Puma at the beginning of the 2019–20 season. On 30 September 2022, Arsenal announced the extension of the partnership with Adidas until 2030.

- Home: The home kit uses Arsenal's traditional colours of red and white. The shirt has a red body and white sleeves, and is complemented by white shorts and red socks. The new feature added to the home kit is a lightning bolt pattern appearing on the collar and socks.
- Away: On 18 July 2022, the Gunners released their new away kit. The all-black shirt combines a bronze cannon badge and metallic trims with an all-over AFC graphic, and is partnered with black shorts and socks. White shorts and grey socks were used in some away games when there was a colour clash with the home team's kit. It was reported that Arsenal sold £1million of the new away kit on launch day, a new club's record for first-day kit sales.
- Third: The new third kit was revealed on 29 July 2022, one day before the 2022 Emirates Cup match. It is the first pink outfield shirt in Arsenal's history. The shirt features an all-over ermine print, and is combined with navy shorts and pink socks.
- No More Red: On 6 January 2023, Arsenal announced that they were going to extend their "No More Red" campaign for a second season; an initiative that aims to combat knife crime in the capital. The same commemorative kit from the previous season was used this season, with typical white features set upon a slightly off-white kit.
- Goalkeeper: The new goalkeeper kits are based on Adidas's goalkeeper template for the season.

==== Kit usage ====
Kit	Combination	Usage	
Home	Red body; White sleeves; White shorts; Red socks	WSL	Brighton & Hove Albion (H); Tottenham Hotspur (H); West Ham United (H); Manchester United (H); Everton (H); Chelsea (H); Liverpool (H); Reading (H); Tottenham Hotspur (A); Manchester City (H); Leicester City (H); Chelsea (H)
Home	Red body; White sleeves; White shorts; Red socks	FA Cup	Leeds United (H); Chelsea (A)
Home	Red body; White sleeves; White shorts; Red socks	League Cup	Aston Villa (H); Manchester City (H); Chelsea (N)
Home	Red body; White sleeves; White shorts; Red socks	UWCL	Ajax (H); FC Zurich (H); Juventus (H); Lyon (H); Bayern Munich (A); Bayern Munich (H); VfL Wolfsburg (A); VfL Wolfsburg (H)
Home 2023-24	Red body; White sleeves; White shorts; Red socks	WSL	Aston Villa (H)
Away	Black body; Black sleeves; Black shorts; Black socks	WSL	Reading (A); Leicester City (A); Manchester City (A); Brighton & Hove Albion (A); Everton (A)
Away	Black body; Black sleeves; Black shorts; Black socks	UWCL	Ajax (A); Lyon (A); Juventus (A); FC Zurich (A)
Third	Pink body; Pink sleeves; Navy shorts; Pink socks	WSL	Liverpool (A); Aston Villa (A); West Ham United (A); Manchester United (A)

==== Goalkeeper kit usage ====
Kit	Combination	Usage	
Goalkeeper 1	Yellow body; Yellow sleeves; Yellow shorts; Yellow socks	WSL	Brighton & Hove Albion (H); Tottenham Hotspur (H); Reading (A); Liverpool (A); West Ham United (H); Leicester City (A); Everton (H); Chelsea (H); West Ham United (A); Liverpool (H); Reading (H); Manchester City (H); Leicester City (H); Everton (A); Chelsea (A); Aston Villa (H)
Goalkeeper 1	Yellow body; Yellow sleeves; Yellow shorts; Yellow socks	FA Cup	Chelsea (A)
Goalkeeper 1	Yellow body; Yellow sleeves; Yellow shorts; Yellow socks	League Cup	Aston Villa (H); Manchester City (H); Chelsea (N)
Goalkeeper 1	Yellow body; Yellow sleeves; Yellow shorts; Yellow socks	UWCL	Ajax (H); Ajax (A); Juventus (A); Juventus (H); FC Zurich (A); Bayern Munich (H)
Goalkeeper 2	Green body; Green sleeves; Green shorts; Green socks	WSL	Aston Villa (A); Manchester City (A); Tottenham Hotspur (A); Manchester United (A)
Goalkeeper 2	Green body; Green sleeves; Green shorts; Green socks	FA Cup	Leeds United (H)
Goalkeeper 2	Green body; Green sleeves; Green shorts; Green socks	UWCL	Lyon (A); FC Zurich (H); Lyon (H); Bayern Munich (A)
Goalkeeper 3	Grey body; Grey sleeves; Grey shorts; Grey socks	WSL	Manchester United (H); Brighton & Hove Albion (A)
Goalkeeper 3	Grey body; Grey sleeves; Grey shorts; Grey socks	UWCL	VfL Wolfsburg (A); VfL Wolfsburg (H)

== Competitions ==
=== Overall record ===
Competition	First match	Last match	Starting round	Final position	Record							
Competition	First match	Last match	Starting round	Final position	Pld	W	D	L	GF	GA	GD	Win %
Women's Super League	16 September 2022	27 May 2023	Matchday 1	3rd	22	15	2	5	49	16	+33	68.18
Women's FA Cup	29 January 2023	26 February 2023	Fourth round	Fifth round	2	1	0	1	9	2	+7	50.00
FA Women's League Cup	26 January 2023	5 March 2023	Quarter-finals	Winners	3	3	0	0	7	1	+6	100.00
UEFA Women's Champions League	20 September 2022	1 May 2023	Second qualifying round	Semi-finals	12	6	3	3	28	13	+15	50.00
Total					39	25	5	9	93	32	+61	64.10

Source: FA WSL

=== Women's Super League ===
==== League table ====
Pos	Team	Pld	W	D	L	GF	GA	GD	Pts	Qualification or relegation
1	Chelsea (C)	22	19	1	2	66	15	+51	58	Qualification for the Champions League group stage (Note: England's UEFA association coefficient meant, as the 4th ranked association, the WSL champions qualified for the second round. However, as 2022–23 UEFA Women's Champions League winners Barcelona had already qualified for the group stage as 2022–23 Liga F champions, the title holders' berth to the group stage was redistributed to Chelsea.)
2	Manchester United	22	18	2	2	56	12	+44	56	Qualification for the Champions League second round
3	Arsenal	22	15	2	5	49	16	+33	47	Qualification for the Champions League first round
4	Manchester City	22	15	2	5	50	25	+25	47	
5	Aston Villa	22	11	4	7	47	37	+10	37	

Source: Women's Super League
Rules for classification: 1) Points; 2) Goal difference; 3) Number of goals scored.
(C) Champions

==== Results summary ====
Overall								Home						Away					
Pld	W	D	L	GF	GA	GD	Pts	W	D	L	GF	GA	GD	W	D	L	GF	GA	GD
22	15	2	5	49	16	+33	47	8	1	2	24	8	+16	7	1	3	25	8	+17

Last updated: 27 May 2023.
Source: FA WSL

==== Results by matchday ====
Matchday	1^{1}	2	3	4	5	6	7	8	9	10	11	12	13	14	15	16	17	18	19	20	21	22
Ground	H	H	A	A	H	A	H	H	A	H	A	A	H	H	A	H	A	H	A	A	A	H
Result	W	W	W	W	W	W	L	W	W	D	D	L	W	W	W	W	L	W	W	W	L	L
Position	1	1	2	1	2	1	2	3	2	3	3	4	4	4	4	3	4	4	3	3	3	3

Updated to match(es) played on 27 May 2023. Source: FA WSL
A = Away; H = Home; W = Win; D = Draw; L = Loss; P = Postponed
Notes:
- ^{1} Matchday 1 (vs. Manchester City) was postponed, alongside all other matches in the Women's Super League, due to the passing of Queen Elizabeth II.

==== Matches ====
16 September 2022 1	Arsenal	4–0	Brighton & Hove Albion	Borehamwood
19:30 BST	Little 28'; Blackstenius 50'; Foord (yellow card) 59'; Mead 63', 83'	Report	Kullberg (red card) 7'	Stadium: Meadow Park; Attendance: 3,238; Referee: Lisa Benn

24 September 2022 2	Arsenal	4–0	Tottenham Hotspur	Holloway
13:30 BST	Mead 5'; Miedema 44', 69'; Rafaelle 54'; Foord (yellow card) 56'	Report	Spence (yellow card) 54'; Turner (yellow card) 59'; Neville (yellow card) 62'	Stadium: Emirates Stadium; Attendance: 47,367; Referee: Rebecca Welch

16 October 2022 3	Reading	0–1	Arsenal	Reading
18:45 BST	Primmer (yellow card) 41'; Woodham (yellow card) 47'; Cooper (yellow card) 63'; Bryson (yellow card) 90+7'	Report	Blackstenius 30'; McCabe (yellow card) 61'; Little (penalty missed) 61'; Foord (yellow card) 64'	Stadium: Madejski Stadium; Attendance: 3,660; Referee: Louise Saunders

23 October 2022 4	Liverpool	0–2	Arsenal	Birkenhead
12:00 BST		Report	Wälti 15'; Maanum 22'	Stadium: Prenton Park; Attendance: 3,348; Referee: Anthony Backhouse

30 October 2022 5	Arsenal	3–1	West Ham United	Borehamwood
18:45 GMT	Nobbs 42'; Blackstenius 53'; Maanum 70'	Report	Brynjarsdóttir 35'; Longhurst (yellow card) 52'; Kyvåg (yellow card) 57'; Filis (yellow card) 84'	Stadium: Meadow Park; Attendance: 3,988; Referee: Abigail Byrne

6 November 2022 6	Leicester City	0–4	Arsenal	Leicester
14:00 GMT	Bott (yellow card) 43'	Report	Maanum 13'; Foord 22'; Catley 37'; Blackstenius 48'	Stadium: King Power Stadium; Attendance: 3,590; Referee: Amy Fearn

19 November 2022 7	Arsenal	2–3	Manchester United	Holloway
17:30 GMT	Maanum 46'; Wienroither 73'; McCabe (yellow card) 90+9'	Report	Toone 39'; Parris (yellow card) 43'; Ladd (yellow card) 76'; Turner 85'; Russo 90+1'	Stadium: Emirates Stadium; Attendance: 40,604; Referee: Kirsty Dowle

3 December 2022 8	Arsenal	1–0	Everton	Borehamwood
14:00 GMT	Miedema 24'	Report	Björn (yellow card) 71'; George (yellow card) 80'	Stadium: Meadow Park; Attendance: 3,935; Referee: Sunny Gill

11 December 2022 9	Aston Villa	1–4	Arsenal	Aston
16:15 GMT	Hanson 6'; Turner (yellow card) 38'	Report	Corsie 26' (o.g.); Miedema 30'; McCabe 62'; Nobbs 84'	Stadium: Villa Park; Attendance: 6,013; Referee: Paul Howard

15 January 2023 10	Arsenal	1–1	Chelsea	Holloway
14:00 GMT	Little 57' (pen.); McCabe (yellow card) 88'	Report	James (yellow card) 39'; Kerr 89'	Stadium: Emirates Stadium; Attendance: 46,881; Referee: Emily Heaslip

5 February 2023 12	West Ham United	0–0	Arsenal	Dagenham
18:45 GMT	Stringer (yellow card) 42'	Report		Stadium: Victoria Road; Attendance: 2,632; Referee: Richie Watkins

12 February 2023 13	Manchester City	2–1	Arsenal	Manchester
12:30 GMT	Hemp 4', (yellow card) 58'; Kelly 43'; Greenwood (yellow card) 56'	Report	McCabe (yellow card) 58'; Rafaelle 59'; Maritz (yellow card) 78'	Stadium: Academy Stadium; Attendance: 4,542; Referee: Rebecca Welch
Note: Originally scheduled for 11 September 2022, this match, alongside all others in the Women's Super League, was postponed due to the passing of Queen Elizabeth II.

8 March 2023 14	Arsenal	2–0	Liverpool	Borehamwood
19:15 GMT	Blackstenius 28'; Foord 34'; Queiroz (yellow card) 81'	Report	Holland (yellow card) 33'; Lundgaard (yellow card) 90'	Stadium: Meadow Park; Attendance: 3,554; Referee: Emily Heaslip

12 March 2023 15	Arsenal	4–0	Reading	Borehamwood
18:45 GMT	Little 4' (pen.); Maanum 44'; Mukandi 47' (o.g.); Williamson 69'	Report	Moloney (yellow card) 56'; Woodham (yellow card) 86'	Stadium: Meadow Park; Attendance: 3,964; Referee: Amy Fearn

25 March 2023 16	Tottenham Hotspur	1–5	Arsenal	Leyton
15:00 GMT	England 39' (pen.); James (yellow card) 69'	Report	Blackstenius 5'; Foord 29', 70'; Little 66' (pen.); Maanum 76'	Stadium: Brisbane Road; Attendance: 3,754; Referee: Louise Saunders

2 April 2023 17	Arsenal	2–1	Manchester City	Borehamwood
12:30 BST	McCabe (yellow card) 10', (goal) 74'; Maanum 62'; Wälti (yellow card) 70'	Report	Shaw 5'	Stadium: Meadow Park; Attendance: 3,980; Referee: Abigail Byrne

19 April 2023 18	Manchester United	1–0	Arsenal	Leigh
19:15 BST	Zelem (yellow card) 34'; Ladd (yellow card) 45+3'; Russo 45+6'; Batlle (yellow card) 85'; Blundell (yellow card) 90+5'	Report	Queiroz (yellow card) 45'	Stadium: Leigh Sports Village; Attendance: 6,658; Referee: Abigail Byrne
Note: Originally scheduled for 22 April, this match was moved forward due to Arsenal's progression to the semi-finals of the UEFA Women's Champions League.

5 May 2023 20	Arsenal	1–0	Leicester City	Borehamwood
19:30 BST	McCabe (penalty missed) 7'; Maanum 64', (yellow card) 90+7'	Report	Plumptre (yellow card) 48'; Bott (yellow card) 90+8'	Stadium: Meadow Park; Attendance: 3,982; Referee: Emily Heaslip

10 May 2023 11	Brighton & Hove Albion	0–4	Arsenal	Crawley
19:30 BST		Report	Blackstenius 6', 8'; Maanum 39'; Pelova 45'	Stadium: Broadfield Stadium; Attendance: 4,411; Referee: Kirsty Dowle
Note: This match was postponed on 22 January 2023 due to a frozen pitch, kick-off was scheduled for 18:45.

17 May 2023 19	Everton	1–4	Arsenal	Walton
18:15 BST	Holmgaard (yellow card) 10'; Beever-Jones (red card) 49'; Snoeijs 86'	Report	Foord 29', 39'; McCabe 33'; Wubben-Moy 42'	Stadium: Walton Hall Park; Attendance: 1,350; Referee: Cheryl Foster
Note: This match was moved due to Arsenal reaching the semi-finals of the UEFA Women's Champions League. The match was originally scheduled to take place on 30 April 2023 at 1300.

21 May 2023 21	Chelsea	2–0	Arsenal	Kingston upon Thames
12:30 BST	Reiten 22'; Eriksson 41'	Report	Wubben-Moy (yellow card) 34'; McCabe (yellow card) 45+1', (penalty missed) 60'	Stadium: Kingsmeadow; Attendance: 3,456; Referee: Abigail Byrne

27 May 2023 22	Arsenal	0–2	Aston Villa	Borehamwood
14:30 BST	Taylor (yellow card) 32'; McCabe (yellow card) 86'	Report	Daly 45+2'; Lehmann 49'; Magill (yellow card) 70'; Allen (yellow card) 77'; Hampton (yellow card) 85'; Hanson (yellow card) 90+3'	Stadium: Meadow Park; Attendance: 4,018; Referee: Amy Fearn

=== FA Cup ===
As a member of the top two tiers, Arsenal entered the FA Cup in the fourth round.

29 January 2023 Fourth round	Arsenal	9–0	Leeds United	Borehamwood
14:00 GMT (UTC+0)	Foord 10'; Møller Kühl 13'; Little 43' (pen.); Hurtig 58'; Beattie 70'; Blackstenius 72', 75'; Agyemang 80'; Pelova 83'	Report		Stadium: Meadow Park; Attendance: 2,405; Referee: Adewunmi Soneye

26 February 2023 Fifth round	Chelsea	2–0	Arsenal	Kingston upon Thames
14:00 GMT (UTC+0)	Ingle 21'; Charles (yellow card) 45'; Kerr 56'	Report	Maritz (yellow card) 90+4'	Stadium: Kingsmeadow; Attendance: 2,888; Referee: Abigail Byrne

=== FA Women's League Cup ===
Arsenal automatically qualified for the quarter-finals of the League Cup because of reaching the Champions League group stage.

26 January 2023 Quarter-finals	Arsenal	3–0	Aston Villa	Borehamwood
19:45 GMT (UTC+0)	Maanum 29', 50'; McCabe (yellow card) 40'; Foord 60'	Report		Stadium: Meadow Park; Attendance: 2,959; Referee: Carl Brook

8 February 2023 Semi-finals	Arsenal	1–0 (a.e.t.)	Manchester City	Borehamwood
19:45 GMT (UTC+0)	Wubben-Moy (yellow card) 53'; Little (yellow card) 71'; Rafaelle (yellow card) 81'; Maritz (yellow card) 92'; Blackstenius 93'; Foord (yellow card) 116'	Report	Kelly (yellow card) 34'; Hemp (yellow card) 90+5'	Stadium: Meadow Park; Attendance: 1,795; Referee: Abigail Byrne

5 March 2023 Final	Chelsea	1–3	Arsenal	Selhurst
15:00 GMT (UTC+0)	Kerr 2'; Leupolz (yellow card) 58'; James (yellow card) 83'	Report	Blackstenius 16'; Little 24' (pen.); McCabe (yellow card) 32'; Charles 45+5' (o.g.); Foord (yellow card) 90+6'	Stadium: Selhurst Park; Attendance: 19,010; Referee: Kirsty Dowle

=== UEFA Women's Champions League ===
==== Second qualifying round ====
20 September 2022 First leg	Arsenal (England)	2–2	(Netherlands) Ajax	Borehamwood
19:30 BST	Blackstenius 23'; Little 57' (pen.)	Report	Leuchter 18', 83'; Verhoeve (yellow card) 55'; Van der Most (yellow card) 64'; Doorn (yellow card) 69'	Stadium: Meadow Park; Attendance: 2,550; Referee: Frida Nielsen (Denmark)

28 September 2022 Second leg	Ajax (Netherlands)	0–1	(England) Arsenal	Duivendrecht
18:00 BST	Spitse (yellow card) 32'; Doorn (yellow card) 89'	Report	Miedema 51'	Stadium: Sportpark De Toekomst; Attendance: 1,831; Referee: Marta Huerta De Aza (Spain)

==== Group stage ====
Pos	Team	Pld	W	D	L	GF	GA	GD	Pts	Qualification	ARS	LYO	JUV	ZÜR
1	(England) Arsenal	6	4	1	1	19	5	+14	13	Advance to Quarter-finals	—	0–1	1–0	3–1
2	(France) Lyon	6	3	2	1	10	6	+4	11	Advance to Quarter-finals	1–5	—	0–0	4–0
3	(Italy) Juventus	6	2	3	1	9	3	+6	9		1–1	1–1	—	5–0
4	(Switzerland) Zürich	6	0	0	6	2	26	−24	0		1–9	0–3	0–2	—

Source: UEFA
Rules for classification: Group stage tiebreakers

19 October 2022 1	Lyon (France)	1–5	(England) Arsenal	Décines-Charpieu
21:00	Malard 27'; Renard (yellow card) 44'	Report	Foord 13', 67'; Maanum 23'; Mead 45+1', 69' (yellow card) 90+3'	Stadium: Parc Olympique Lyonnais; Attendance: 8,012; Referee: Ivana Projkovska (North Macedonia)

27 October 2022 2	Arsenal (England)	3–1	(Switzerland) Zürich	Holloway
21:00	Nobbs 38'; Hurtig 45+1', 79'	Report	Bernauer (yellow card) 36'; Piubel 76'; Riesen (yellow card) 90+1'	Stadium: Emirates Stadium; Attendance: 5,397; Referee: Lina Lehtovaara (Finland)

24 November 2022 3	Juventus (Italy)	1–1	(England) Arsenal	Turin
21:00	Junge Pedersen (yellow card) 48'; Beerensteyn 52' (yellow card) 84'	Report	Miedema 61'; Blackstenius (yellow card) 63'; Wälti (yellow card) 90'	Stadium: Juventus Stadium; Attendance: 8,508; Referee: Iuliana Demetrescu (Romania)

7 December 2022 4	Arsenal (England)	1–0	(Italy) Juventus	Holloway
21:00	Miedema 17'	Report		Stadium: Emirates Stadium; Attendance: 6,592; Referee: Ivana Martinčić (Croatia)

15 December 2022 5	Arsenal (England)	0–1	(France) Lyon	Holloway
21:00	McCabe (yellow card) 84'	Report	Maanum 45+2' (o.g.)	Stadium: Emirates Stadium; Attendance: 7,711; Referee: Marta Huerta de Aza (Spain)

21 December 2022 6	Zürich (Switzerland)	1–9	(England) Arsenal	Schaffhausen
18:45	Humm 64' (pen.); Bernauer (yellow card) 74'; Riesen (yellow card) 81'	Report	Maanum 18', 32', 51'; Foord 23', 68'; Blackstenius 45+1', 54'; Little 71' (pen.); Iwabuchi 83'	Stadium: Wefox Arena; Attendance: 4,264; Referee: Alina Peşu (Romania)

==== Knockout phase ====
===== Quarter-finals =====
21 March 2023 First leg	Bayern Munich (Germany)	1–0	(England) Arsenal	Munich
17:45 GMT (UTC+0)	Schüller 39'; Lohmann (yellow card) 80'	Report	Foord (yellow card) 49'	Stadium: Allianz Arena; Attendance: 20,000; Referee: Ivana Projkovska (North Macedonia)

29 March 2023 Second leg	Arsenal (England)	2–0 (2–1 agg.)	(Germany) Bayern Munich	Holloway
20:00 BST (UTC+1)	Wubben-Moy (yellow card) 15'; Maanum 20'; Blackstenius 26'; Rafaelle (yellow card) 38'; Maritz (yellow card) 80'; Eidevall (yellow card) 90+7'	Report	Kett (yellow card) 44'; Damnjanović (yellow card) 80'; Stanway (yellow card) 90+7'	Stadium: Emirates Stadium; Attendance: 21,307; Referee: Marta Huerta de Aza (Spain)

===== Semi-finals =====
22 April 2023 First leg	VfL Wolfsburg (Germany)	2–2	(England) Arsenal	Wolfsburg
14:30 BST (UTC+1)	Pajor 19'; Jónsdóttir 24'; Roord (yellow card) 28'; Oberdorf (yellow card) 90+2'	Report	Rafaelle 45'; Blackstenius 69'; McCabe (yellow card) 90+2'	Stadium: Volkswagen Arena; Attendance: 22,617; Referee: Kateryna Monzul (Ukraine)

1 May 2023 Second leg	Arsenal (England)	2–3 (a.e.t.) (4–5 agg.)	(Germany) VfL Wolfsburg	Holloway
17:45 BST (UTC+1)	Blackstenius 11'; Maritz (yellow card) 41'; Beattie (yellow card) 52', (goal) 75'; Catley (yellow card) 117'; Pelova (yellow card) 120+3'	Report	Roord 41'; Huth (yellow card) 50'; Popp 58'; Waßmuth (yellow card) 105'; Rauch (yellow card) 114'; Bremer 119'	Stadium: Emirates Stadium; Attendance: 60,063; Referee: Lina Lehtovaara (Finland)

== Awards ==
Arsenal Goal of the Season: Katie McCabe (v Manchester City away)

== See also ==
- List of Arsenal W.F.C. seasons
- 2022–23 in English football
