= 2022–23 in French football =

Football in France
- Season: 2022–23

Men's football
- Ligue 1: Paris Saint-Germain
- Ligue 2: Le Havre
- Championnat National: Concarneau
- Coupe de France: Toulouse
- Trophée des Champions: Paris Saint-Germain

Women's football
- Division 1: Lyon
- Coupe de France: Lyon
- Trophée des Championnes: Lyon

The following article is a summary of the 2022–23 football season in France, which was the 89th season of competitive football in the country and ran from July 2022 to June 2023.

== National team ==
=== France national football team ===
==== UEFA Nations League ====
===== Group 1 =====
Pos	Team	Pld	W	D	L	GF	GA	GD	Pts	Qualification or relegation	(Croatia)	(Denmark)	(France)	(Austria)
1	Croatia	6	4	1	1	8	6	+2	13	Qualification for Nations League Finals	—	2–1	1–1	0–3
2	Denmark	6	4	0	2	9	5	+4	12		0–1	—	2–0	2–0
3	France	6	1	2	3	5	7	−2	5		0–1	1–2	—	2–0
4	Austria (R)	6	1	1	4	6	10	−4	4	Relegation to League B	1–3	1–2	1–1	—

Source: UEFA
(R) Relegated

22 September 2022	France	2–0	Austria	Saint-Denis, France
20:45 CEST (UTC+2)	Mbappé 56'; Giroud 65'	Report		Stadium: Stade de France; Attendance: 70,188; Referee: Andreas Ekberg (Sweden)

25 September 2022	Denmark	2–0	France	Copenhagen, Denmark
20:45 CEST (UTC+2)	Dolberg 34'; Skov Olsen 39'	Report		Stadium: Parken Stadium; Attendance: 36,064; Referee: István Kovács (Romania)

==== FIFA World Cup ====
===== Group D =====
Pos	Team	Pld	W	D	L	GF	GA	GD	Pts	Qualification
1	France	3	2	0	1	6	3	+3	6	Advance to knockout stage
2	Australia	3	2	0	1	3	4	−1	6	Advance to knockout stage
3	Tunisia	3	1	1	1	1	1	0	4	
4	Denmark	3	0	1	2	1	3	−2	1	

Source: FIFA
Rules for classification: Group stage tiebreakers

22 November 2022	France	4–1	Australia	Al Wakrah, Qatar
22:00 AST (UTC+3)	Rabiot 27'; Giroud 32', 71'; Mbappé 68'	Report	Goodwin 9'	Stadium: Al Janoub Stadium; Referee: Victor Gomes (South Africa)

26 November 2022	France	2–1	Denmark	Doha, Qatar
19:00 AST (UTC+3)	Mbappé 61', 86'	Report	A. Christensen 68'	Stadium: Stadium 974; Attendance: 42,860; Referee: Szymon Marciniak (Poland)

30 November 2022	Tunisia	1–0	France	Al Rayyan, Qatar
18:00 AST (UTC+3)	Khazri 58'	Report		Stadium: Education City Stadium; Attendance: 43,627; Referee: Matthew Conger (New Zealand)

===== Knockout stage =====
4 December 2022 R16	France	3–1	Poland	Doha, Qatar
	Giroud 44'; Mbappé 74', 90+1'	Report	Lewandowski 90+9' (pen.)	Stadium: Al Thumama Stadium; Attendance: 40,989; Referee: Jesús Valenzuela (Venezuela)

10 December 2022 QF	England	1–2	France	Al Khor, Qatar
22:00 AST (UTC+3)	Kane 54' (pen.)	Report	Tchouaméni 17'; Giroud 78'	Stadium: Al Bayt Stadium; Attendance: 68,895; Referee: Wilton Sampaio (Brazil)

14 December 2022 SF	France	2–0	Morocco	Al Khor, Qatar
22:00 AST (UTC+3)	T. Hernandez 5'; Kolo Muani 79'	Report		Stadium: Al Bayt Stadium; Attendance: 68,294; Referee: César Ramos (Mexico)

18 December 2022 F	Argentina	3–3 (a.e.t.) (4–2 p)	France	Lusail, Qatar
18:00 AST (UTC+3)	Messi 23' (pen.), 109'; Di María 36'	Report	Mbappé 80' (pen.), 81', 118' (pen.)	Stadium: Lusail Iconic Stadium; Attendance: 88,966; Referee: Szymon Marciniak (Poland)
	Penalties
	Messi (penalty scored); Dybala (penalty scored); Paredes (penalty scored); Montiel (penalty scored)		(penalty scored) Mbappé; (penalty missed) Coman; (penalty missed) Tchouaméni; (penalty scored) Kolo Muani

==== UEFA Euro 2024 qualifying ====
===== Group B =====
Pos	Team	Pld	W	D	L	GF	GA	GD	Pts	Qualification	(France)	(Netherlands)	(Greece)	(Republic of Ireland)	(Gibraltar)
1	France	8	7	1	0	29	3	+26	22	Qualify for final tournament	—	4–0	1–0	2–0	14–0
2	Netherlands	8	6	0	2	17	7	+10	18	Qualify for final tournament	1–2	—	3–0	1–0	3–0
3	Greece	8	4	1	3	14	8	+6	13	Advance to play-offs via Nations League	2–2	0–1	—	2–1	5–0
4	Republic of Ireland	8	2	0	6	9	10	−1	6		0–1	1–2	0–2	—	3–0
5	Gibraltar	8	0	0	8	0	41	−41	0		0–3	0–6	0–3	0–4	—

Source: UEFA
Rules for classification: Qualification tiebreakers

24 March 2023	France	4–0	Netherlands	Saint-Denis, France
20:45	Griezmann 2'; Upamecano 8'; Mbappé 21', 88'	Report		Stadium: Stade de France; Attendance: 77,328; Referee: Maurizio Mariani (Italy)

27 March 2023	Republic of Ireland	0–1	France	Dublin, Republic of Ireland
20:45 (19:45 UTC+1)		Report	Pavard 50'	Stadium: Aviva Stadium; Attendance: 50,219; Referee: Artur Soares Dias (Portugal)

16 June 2023	Gibraltar	0–3	France	Faro/Loulé, Portugal
20:45		Report	Giroud 3'; Mbappé 45+3' (pen.); Mouelhi 78' (o.g.)	Stadium: Estádio Algarve; Attendance: 4,065; Referee: Yevhenii Aranovskiy (Ukraine)

19 June 2023	France	1–0	Greece	Saint-Denis, France
20:45	Mbappé 55' (pen.)	Report		Stadium: Stade de France; Attendance: 76,500; Referee: Antonio Mateu Lahoz (Spain)

=== France women's national football team ===
==== Friendlies ====
1 July 2022	France	7–0	Vietnam	Orléans, France
21:10	Cascarino 5'; Diani 11', 45+1'; Toletti 16'; Katoto 22'; Matéo 33'; Tounkara 68'	Report		Stadium: Stade de la Source

7 October 2022	Germany	2–1	France	Dresden, Germany
20:30 UTC+2				Stadium: Rudolf-Harbig-Stadion

11 October 2022	Sweden	3–0	France	Gothenburg, Sweden
18:30 UTC+2				Stadium: Gamla Ullevi

11 November 2022	France	2–1	Norway
TBC

7 April 2023	France	5–2	Colombia	Clermont-Ferrand, France
19:10				Stadium: Stade Gabriel Montpied

11 April 2023	France	2–1	Canada	Le Mans, France
				Stadium: MMArena

==== UEFA Women's Euro ====
===== Group D =====
Pos	Team	Pld	W	D	L	GF	GA	GD	Pts	Qualification
1	France	3	2	1	0	8	3	+5	7	Advance to knockout stage
2	Belgium	3	1	1	1	3	3	0	4	Advance to knockout stage
3	Iceland	3	0	3	0	3	3	0	3	
4	Italy	3	0	1	2	2	7	−5	1	

Source: UEFA
Rules for classification: Group stage tiebreakers

10 July 2022	France	5–1	Italy	Rotherham, England
21:00	Geyoro 9', 40', 45'; Katoto 12'; Cascarino 38'	Report	Piemonte 76'	Stadium: New York Stadium; Attendance: 8,541; Referee: Rebecca Welch (England)

14 July 2022	France	2–1	Belgium	Rotherham, England
21:00	Diani 6'; Mbock Bathy 41'	Report	Cayman 36'	Stadium: New York Stadium; Attendance: 8,173; Referee: Cheryl Foster (Wales)

18 July 2022	Iceland	1–1	France	Rotherham, England
21:00	Brynjarsdóttir 90+12' (pen.)	Report	Malard 1'	Stadium: New York Stadium; Attendance: 7,392; Referee: Jana Adámková (Czech Republic)

===== Knockout stage =====
23 July 2022 QF	France	1–0 (a.e.t.)	Netherlands	Rotherham, England
20:00	Périsset 102' (pen.)	Report		Stadium: New York Stadium; Attendance: 9,764; Referee: Ivana Martinčić (Croatia)

27 July 2022 SF	Germany	2–1	France	Milton Keynes, England
20:00	Popp 40', 76'	Report	Frohms 44' (o.g.)	Stadium: Stadium MK; Attendance: 27,445; Referee: Cheryl Foster (Wales)

==== 2023 FIFA Women's World Cup qualification ====
===== Group I =====
Pos	Team	Pld	W	D	L	GF	GA	GD	Pts	Qualification	(France)	(Wales)	(Slovenia)	(Greece)	(Estonia)	(Kazakhstan)
1	France	10	10	0	0	54	4	+50	30	2023 FIFA Women's World Cup	—	2–0	1–0	5–1	11–0	6–0
2	Wales	10	6	2	2	22	5	+17	20	Play-offs	1–2	—	0–0	5–0	4–0	6–0
3	Slovenia	10	5	3	2	21	6	+15	18		2–3	1–1	—	0–0	6–0	2–0
4	Greece	10	4	1	5	12	28	−16	13		0–10	0–1	1–4	—	3–0	3–2
5	Estonia	10	2	0	8	7	43	−36	6		0–9	0–1	0–4	1–3	—	4–2
6	Kazakhstan	10	0	0	10	4	34	−30	0		0–5	0–3	0–2	0–1	0–2	—

Source: UEFA
Rules for classification: Tiebreakers

2 September 2022	Estonia	0–9	France	Tallinn, Estonia
17:00		Report	Cascarino 5'; Dali 17' (pen.); Sarr 24', 28', 45', 47'; Matéo 59' (pen.), 67'; Geyoro 83'	Stadium: Lilleküla Stadium; Referee: Silvia Domingos (Portugal)

6 September 2022	France	5–1	Greece	Sedan, France
20:45	Geyoro 9'; Diani 18', 45+9'; Malard 45'; Baltimore 59'	Report	Koggouli 20'	Stadium: Stade Louis Dugauguez; Referee: Riem Hussein (Germany)

==== Tournoi de France ====
Pos	Team	Pld	W	D	L	GF	GA	GD	Pts
1	France (H, C)	3	2	1	0	6	1	+5	7
2	Denmark	3	2	0	1	5	3	+2	6
3	Norway	3	1	1	1	1	2	−1	4
4	Uruguay	3	0	0	3	3	9	−6	0

Rules for classification: 1) points; 2) goal difference; 3) goals scored; 4) head-to-head points; 5) head-to-head goal difference; 6) head-to-head number of goals scored; 7) FIFA ranking.
(C) Champions; (H) Hosts

15 February 2023	France	1–0	Denmark	Laval, France
21:10	Bilbault 31'	Report		Stadium: Stade Francis Le Basser; Attendance: 7,409; Referee: Monika Mularczyk (Poland)

18 February 2023	France	5–1	Uruguay	Angers, France
21:10	Bussy 26'; Dali 34'; Renard 43'; Toletti 71'; Feller 79'	Report	L. Gómez 32'	Stadium: Stade Raymond Kopa; Attendance: 9,070; Referee: Lorraine Watson (Scotland)

21 February 2023	France	0–0	Norway	Angers, France
21:10				Stadium: Stade Raymond Kopa

== UEFA competitions ==
=== UEFA Champions League ===
==== Qualifying rounds ====
===== Third qualifying round =====
Team 1	Agg.	Team 2	1st leg	2nd leg
Monaco (France)	3–4	(Netherlands) PSV Eindhoven	1–1	2–3 (a.e.t.)

==== Group stage ====
===== Group D =====
Pos	Team	Pld	W	D	L	GF	GA	GD	Pts	Qualification	TOT	FRA	SPO	MAR
1	(England) Tottenham Hotspur	6	3	2	1	8	6	+2	11	Advance to knockout phase	—	3–2	1–1	2–0
2	(Germany) Eintracht Frankfurt	6	3	1	2	7	8	−1	10	Advance to knockout phase	0–0	—	0–3	2–1
3	(Portugal) Sporting CP	6	2	1	3	8	9	−1	7	Transfer to Europa League	2–0	1–2	—	0–2
4	(France) Marseille	6	2	0	4	8	8	0	6		1–2	0–1	4–1	—

Source: UEFA

===== Group H =====
Pos	Team	Pld	W	D	L	GF	GA	GD	Pts	Qualification	BEN	PAR	JUV	MHA
1	(Portugal) Benfica	6	4	2	0	16	7	+9	14 (Note: Tied on head-to-head results, overall goal difference and overall goals scored. Overall away goals scored: Benfica 9, Paris Saint-Germain 6.)	Advance to knockout phase	—	1–1	4–3	2–0
2	(France) Paris Saint-Germain	6	4	2	0	16	7	+9	14	Advance to knockout phase	1–1	—	2–1	7–2
3	(Italy) Juventus	6	1	0	5	9	13	−4	3 (Note: Tied on head-to-head results. Overall goal difference is used as the tiebreaker.)	Transfer to Europa League	1–2	1–2	—	3–1
4	(Israel) Maccabi Haifa	6	1	0	5	7	21	−14	3		1–6	1–3	2–0	—

Source: UEFA

==== Knockout phase ====
===== Round of 16 =====
Team 1	Agg.	Team 2	1st leg	2nd leg
Paris Saint-Germain (France)	0–3	(Germany) Bayern Munich	0–1	0–2

=== UEFA Europa League ===
==== Group stage ====
===== Group B =====
Pos	Team	Pld	W	D	L	GF	GA	GD	Pts	Qualification	FEN	REN	AEK	DKV
1	(Turkey) Fenerbahçe	6	4	2	0	13	7	+6	14	Advance to round of 16	—	3–3	2–0	2–1
2	(France) Rennes	6	3	3	0	11	8	+3	12	Advance to knockout round play-offs	2–2	—	1–1	2–1
3	(Cyprus) AEK Larnaca	6	1	2	3	7	10	−3	5	Transfer to Europa Conference League	1–2	1–2	—	3–3
4	(Ukraine) Dynamo Kyiv	6	0	1	5	5	11	−6	1		0–2	0–1	0–1	—

Source: UEFA

===== Group G =====
Pos	Team	Pld	W	D	L	GF	GA	GD	Pts	Qualification	FRE	NAN	QRB	OLY
1	(Germany) SC Freiburg	6	4	2	0	13	3	+10	14	Advance to round of 16	—	2–0	2–1	1–1
2	(France) Nantes	6	3	0	3	6	11	−5	9	Advance to knockout round play-offs	0–4	—	2–1	2–1
3	(Azerbaijan) Qarabağ	6	2	2	2	9	5	+4	8	Transfer to Europa Conference League	1–1	3–0	—	0–0
4	(Greece) Olympiacos	6	0	2	4	2	11	−9	2		0–3	0–2	0–3	—

Source: UEFA

===== Group H =====
Pos	Team	Pld	W	D	L	GF	GA	GD	Pts	Qualification	FER	MON	TRA	ZVE
1	(Hungary) Ferencváros	6	3	1	2	8	9	−1	10 (Note: Head to head points: Ferencváros 4, Monaco 1.)	Advance to round of 16	—	1–1	3–2	2–1
2	(France) Monaco	6	3	1	2	9	8	+1	10	Advance to knockout round play-offs	0–1	—	3–1	4–1
3	(Turkey) Trabzonspor	6	3	0	3	11	9	+2	9	Transfer to Europa Conference League	1–0	4–0	—	2–1
4	(Serbia) Red Star Belgrade	6	2	0	4	9	11	−2	6		4–1	0–1	2–1	—

Source: UEFA

==== Knockout stage ====
===== Knockout round play-offs =====
Team 1	Agg.	Team 2	1st leg	2nd leg
Juventus (Italy)	4–1	(France) Nantes	1–1	3–0
Shakhtar Donetsk (Ukraine)	3–3 (5–4 p)	(France) Rennes	2–1	1–2 (a.e.t.)
Bayer Leverkusen (Germany)	5–5 (5–3 p)	(France) Monaco	2–3	3–2 (a.e.t.)

=== UEFA Europa Conference League ===
==== Qualifying phase and play-off round ====
===== Play-off round =====
Team 1	Agg.	Team 2	1st leg	2nd leg
Maccabi Tel Aviv (Israel)	1–2	(France) Nice	1–0	0–2 (a.e.t.)

===== Group D =====
Pos	Team	Pld	W	D	L	GF	GA	GD	Pts	Qualification	NCE	PRT	KLN	SVK
1	(France) Nice	6	2	3	1	8	7	+1	9 (Note: Head-to-head points: Nice 4, Partizan 1.)	Advance to round of 16	—	2–1	1–1	1–2
2	(Serbia) Partizan	6	2	3	1	9	7	+2	9	Advance to knockout round play-offs	1–1	—	2–0	1–1
3	(Germany) 1. FC Köln	6	2	2	2	8	8	0	8		2–2	0–1	—	4–2
4	(Czech Republic) Slovácko	6	1	2	3	8	11	−3	5		0–1	3–3	0–1	—

Source: UEFA

==== Knockout stage ====
===== Round of 16 =====
Team 1	Agg.	Team 2	1st leg	2nd leg
Sheriff Tiraspol (Moldova)	1–4	(France) Nice	0–1	1–3

===== Quarter-finals =====
Team 1	Agg.	Team 2	1st leg	2nd leg
Basel (Switzerland)	4–3	(France) Nice	2–2	2–1 (a.e.t.)

=== UEFA Youth League ===
==== UEFA Champions League Path ====
===== Group stage =====
====== Group D ======
Pos	Team	Pld	W	D	L	GF	GA	GD	Pts	Qualification	SPO	FRA	TOT	MAR
1	(Portuguese Football Federation) Sporting CP	6	4	2	0	13	3	+10	14	Round of 16	—	1–0	2–0	1–1
2	(German Football Association) Eintracht Frankfurt	6	3	2	1	9	6	+3	11	Play-offs	1–1	—	1–0	2–0
3	(The Football Association) Tottenham Hotspur	6	2	0	4	9	10	−1	6		1–2	2–3	—	3–0
4	(French Football Federation) Marseille	6	0	2	4	6	18	−12	2		0–6	2–2	2–3	—

Source: UEFA

====== Group H ======
Pos	Team	Pld	W	D	L	GF	GA	GD	Pts	Qualification	PAR	JUV	BEN	MHA
1	(French Football Federation) Paris Saint-Germain	6	4	1	1	20	11	+9	13	Round of 16	—	5–3	2–3	3–1
2	(Italian Football Federation) Juventus	6	3	2	1	17	14	+3	11	Play-offs	4–4	—	1–1	3–1
3	(Portuguese Football Federation) Benfica	6	2	1	3	12	10	+2	7		0–1	2–3	—	0–1
4	(Israel Football Association) Maccabi Haifa	6	1	0	5	6	20	−14	3		0–5	1–3	2–6	—

Source: UEFA

==== Domestic Champions Path ====
===== First round =====
Team 1	Agg.	Team 2	1st leg	2nd leg
Nantes (France)	5–0	(Armenia) Pyunik	2–0	3–0

===== Second round =====
Team 1	Agg.	Team 2	1st leg	2nd leg
Hibernian (Scotland)	3–1	(France) Nantes	1–0	2–1

==== Knockout round ====
===== Round of 16 =====
Team 1	Score	Team 2
Borussia Dortmund (Germany)	1–1 (5–4 p)	(France) Paris Saint-Germain

=== UEFA Women's Champions League ===
==== Qualifying rounds ====
===== Round 1 =====
====== Semi-finals ======
Team 1	Score	Team 2
Paris FC (France)	3–0	(Switzerland) Servette

====== Final ======
Team 1	Score	Team 2
Paris FC (France)	0–0 (4–5 p)	(Italy) Roma

===== Round 2 =====
Team 1	Agg.	Team 2	1st leg	2nd leg
Paris Saint-Germain (France)	4–1	(Sweden) BK Häcken	2–1	2–0

==== Group stage ====
===== Group A =====
Pos	Team	Pld	W	D	L	GF	GA	GD	Pts	Qualification	CHE	PAR	MAD	VLL
1	(England) Chelsea	6	5	1	0	19	1	+18	16	Advance to Quarter-finals	—	3–0	2–0	8–0
2	(France) Paris Saint-Germain	6	3	1	2	11	5	+6	10	Advance to Quarter-finals	0–1	—	2–1	5–0
3	(Spain) Real Madrid	6	2	2	2	9	6	+3	8		1–1	0–0	—	5–1
4	(Albania) Vllaznia	6	0	0	6	1	28	−27	0		0–4	0–4	0–2	—

Source: UEFA

===== Group C =====
Pos	Team	Pld	W	D	L	GF	GA	GD	Pts	Qualification	ARS	LYO	JUV	ZÜR
1	(England) Arsenal	6	4	1	1	19	5	+14	13	Advance to Quarter-finals	—	0–1	1–0	3–1
2	(France) Lyon	6	3	2	1	10	6	+4	11	Advance to Quarter-finals	1–5	—	0–0	4–0
3	(Italy) Juventus	6	2	3	1	9	3	+6	9		1–1	1–1	—	5–0
4	(Switzerland) Zürich	6	0	0	6	2	26	−24	0		1–9	0–3	0–2	—

Source: UEFA

==== Knockout phase ====
===== Quarter-finals =====
Team 1	Agg.	Team 2	1st leg	2nd leg
Lyon (France)	2–2 (3–4 p)	(England) Chelsea	0–1	2–1 (a.e.t.)
Paris Saint-Germain (France)	1–2	(Germany) VfL Wolfsburg	0–1	1–1

== League season ==
=== Men ===
==== Ligue 1 ====
Pos	Team	Pld	W	D	L	GF	GA	GD	Pts	Qualification or relegation
1	Paris Saint-Germain (C)	38	27	4	7	89	40	+49	85	Qualification for the Champions League group stage
2	Lens	38	25	9	4	68	29	+39	84	Qualification for the Champions League group stage
3	Marseille	38	22	7	9	67	40	+27	73	Qualification for the Champions League third qualifying round
4	Rennes	38	21	5	12	69	39	+30	68	Qualification for the Europa League group stage
5	Lille	38	19	10	9	65	44	+21	67	Qualification for the Europa Conference League play-off round
6	Monaco	38	19	8	11	70	58	+12	65	
7	Lyon	38	18	8	12	65	47	+18	62	
8	Clermont	38	17	8	13	45	49	−4	59	
9	Nice	38	15	13	10	48	37	+11	58	
10	Lorient	38	15	10	13	52	53	−1	55	
11	Reims	38	12	15	11	45	45	0	51	
12	Montpellier	38	15	5	18	65	62	+3	50	
13	Toulouse	38	13	9	16	51	57	−6	48	Qualification for the Europa League group stage (Note: Toulouse qualified for the Europa League group stage as the 2022–23 Coupe de France winners.)
14	Brest	38	11	11	16	44	54	−10	44	
15	Strasbourg	38	9	13	16	51	59	−8	40	
16	Nantes	38	7	15	16	37	55	−18	36	
17	Auxerre (R)	38	8	11	19	35	63	−28	35	Relegation to Ligue 2
18	Ajaccio (R)	38	7	5	26	23	74	−51	26	Relegation to Ligue 2
19	Troyes (R)	38	4	12	22	45	81	−36	24	Relegation to Ligue 2
20	Angers (R)	38	4	6	28	33	81	−48	18	Relegation to Ligue 2

Source: Ligue 1
Rules for classification: 1) Points; 2) Goal difference; 3) Head-to-head points; 4) Head-to-head goal difference; 5) Head-to-head goals scored; 6) Head-to-head away goals scored; 7) Goals scored; 8) Away goals scored; 9) Fair-play points (Note: Head-to-head record is used only after all the matches between the teams in question have been played).
(C) Champions; (R) Relegated

==== Ligue 2 ====
Pos	Team	Pld	W	D	L	GF	GA	GD	Pts	Promotion or Relegation
1	Le Havre (C, P)	38	20	15	3	46	19	+27	75	Promotion to Ligue 1
2	Metz (P)	38	20	12	6	61	33	+28	72	Promotion to Ligue 1
3	Bordeaux	38	20	9	9	51	28	+23	69	
4	Bastia	38	17	9	12	52	45	+7	60	
5	Caen	38	16	11	11	52	43	+9	59	
6	Guingamp	38	15	10	13	51	46	+5	55	
7	Paris FC	38	15	10	13	45	43	+2	55	
8	Saint-Étienne	38	15	11	12	63	57	+6	53 (Note: Saint-Étienne were deducted three points for a pitch invasion during their relegation play-off the previous season.)	
9	Sochaux (D, R)	38	15	7	16	54	41	+13	52	Relegation to Championnat National
10	Grenoble	38	14	9	15	33	36	−3	51	
11	Quevilly-Rouen	38	12	14	12	47	49	−2	50	
12	Amiens	38	13	8	17	40	52	−12	47	
13	Pau	38	12	11	15	40	52	−12	47	
14	Rodez	38	11	13	14	39	44	−5	46	
15	Laval	38	14	4	20	44	56	−12	46	
16	Valenciennes	38	10	15	13	42	49	−7	45	
17	Annecy	38	11	12	15	39	51	−12	45	Spared from relegation
18	Dijon (R)	38	10	12	16	38	43	−5	42	Relegation to Championnat National
19	Nîmes (R)	38	10	6	22	44	62	−18	36	Relegation to Championnat National
20	Niort (R)	38	7	8	23	35	67	−32	29	Relegation to Championnat National

Source: Ligue 2
Rules for classification: 1) Points; 2) Goal difference; 3) Number of goals scored; 4) Head-to-head goal difference; 5) Fair play points
(C) Champions; (D) Disqualified; (P) Promoted; (R) Relegated

==== Championnat National ====
Pos	Team	Pld	W	D	L	GF	GA	GD	Pts	Promotion or relegation
1	Concarneau (C, P)	34	19	6	9	60	37	+23	62 (Note: Concarneau were deducted one point for fielding a suspended player against Orléans on 12 August 2022. Orléans were awarded a 3–0 win.)	Promotion to Ligue 2
2	Dunkerque (P)	34	19	5	10	50	32	+18	62	Promotion to Ligue 2
3	Red Star	34	17	9	8	51	30	+21	60	
4	Martigues	34	15	15	4	54	40	+14	60	
5	Versailles	34	14	9	11	41	41	0	51	
6	Villefranche	34	11	13	10	49	40	+9	46	
7	Sedan	34	12	10	12	41	47	−6	46	Administrative relegation
8	Cholet	34	11	12	11	38	41	−3	45	
9	Avranches	34	14	4	16	44	46	−2	45 (Note: Avranches were deducted one point for fielding a suspended player against Cholet on 12 August 2022. Cholet were awarded a 3–0 win.)	
10	Orléans	34	10	14	10	38	37	+1	44	
11	Châteauroux	34	12	8	14	41	46	−5	44	
12	Le Mans	34	10	13	11	50	42	+8	43	
13	Nancy (T)	34	10	12	12	37	42	−5	41 (Note: Nancy were deducted one point for fielding a player against Concarneau on 28 March 2023, who was suspended when the game originally took place (and was subsequently abandoned) on 13 February 2023. Concarneau were awarded a 3–0 win.)	Spared from relegation
14	Bourg-Péronnas (R)	34	9	13	12	42	46	−4	40	Relegation to Championnat National 2
15	Stade Briochin (R)	34	8	14	12	36	46	−10	38	Relegation to Championnat National 2
16	Le Puy (R)	34	7	14	13	34	50	−16	35	Relegation to Championnat National 2
17	Paris 13 Atletico (R)	34	6	13	15	28	42	−14	31	Relegation to Championnat National 2
18	Borgo (R)	34	6	8	20	32	61	−29	26	Relegation to Championnat National 2

Source: Soccerway
Rules for classification: 1) head-to-head results; 2) head-to-head goal difference; 3) goal difference; 4) goals scored; 5) fair play points
(C) Champions; (P) Promoted; (R) Relegated; (T) Qualified, but not yet for the particular phase indicated

=== Women ===
==== Division 1 Féminine ====
Pos	Team	Pld	W	D	L	GF	GA	GD	Pts	Qualification or relegation
1	Lyon (C)	22	20	1	1	69	9	+60	61	Qualification for the Champions League group stage
2	Paris Saint-Germain	22	17	4	1	45	12	+33	55	Qualification for the Champions League second round
3	Paris FC	22	12	6	4	44	18	+26	42	Qualification for the Champions League first round
4	Fleury	22	11	6	5	49	20	+29	39	
5	Montpellier	22	11	4	7	37	27	+10	37	
6	Reims	22	10	2	10	40	40	0	32	
7	Bordeaux	22	7	6	9	26	33	−7	27	
8	Le Havre	22	7	3	12	31	45	−14	24	
9	Guingamp	22	7	3	12	20	41	−21	24	
10	Dijon	22	4	3	15	12	53	−41	15	
11	Rodez (R)	22	3	3	16	16	48	−32	12	Relegation to Division 2 Féminine
12	Soyaux (R)	22	1	3	18	15	58	−43	6	Relegation to Division 2 Féminine

Source: Division 1 Féminine
Rules for classification: 1) points; 2) head-to-head points; 3) head-to-head goal difference; 4) goal difference; 5) goals scored
(C) Champions; (R) Relegated

== Cup competitions ==
=== 2022–23 Coupe de France ===
==== Final ====
29 April 2023
21:00 CEST

Nantes	1–5	Toulouse
Blas 75' (pen.)	Report	Costa 4', 10'; Dallinga 23', 31'; Aboukhlal 79'

Stade de France, Saint-Denis
Attendance: 78,038
Referee: Benoît Millot

=== 2022 Trophée des Champions ===
31 July 2022
21:00 CEST

Paris Saint-Germain	4–0	Nantes
Messi 22'; Neymar 45+5', 82' (pen.); Ramos 57'	Report

Bloomfield Stadium, Tel Aviv
Attendance: 28,000
Referee: Orel Grinfeld (Israel)

=== 2022–23 Coupe de France Féminine ===
==== Final ====
13 May 2023
16:00

Lyon	2–1	Paris Saint-Germain
Ada Hegerberg 12', 23'	Report	Bachmann 36' (pen.)

Stade de la Source, Orléans
Referee: Alexandra Collin

=== 2022 Trophée des Championnes ===
28 August 2022
21:00

Lyon	1–0	Paris Saint-Germain
Van de Donk 13'

Stade Marcel-Tribut, Dunkirk
Attendance: 4,472
Referee: Émeline Rochebilière
