= 2023 UEFA Women's Champions League final =

- Match programme cover
- Event: 2022–23 UEFA Women's Champions League
Barcelona	VfL Wolfsburg
(Spain)	(Germany)
3	2
- Date: 3 June 2023
- Venue: Philips Stadion, Eindhoven
- Player of the Match: Patricia Guijarro (Barcelona)
- Referee: Cheryl Foster (Wales)
- Attendance: 33,147
- Weather: Clear night 23 °C (73 °F); 25% humidity

The 2023 UEFA Women's Champions League final was the final match of the 2022–23 UEFA Women's Champions League, the 22nd season of Europe's premier women's club football tournament organised by UEFA, and the 14th season since it was renamed from the UEFA Women's Cup to the UEFA Women's Champions League. The match was played at the Philips Stadion in Eindhoven, Netherlands on 3 June 2023, between Spanish club Barcelona and German club VfL Wolfsburg.

Barcelona won the match 3–2 for their second UEFA Women's Champions League title.

== Teams ==
In the following table, finals until 2009 were in the UEFA Women's Cup era, since 2010 were in the UEFA Women's Champions League era.

Team	Previous finals appearances (bold indicates winners)
(Spain) Barcelona	3 (2019, **2021**, 2022)
(Germany) VfL Wolfsburg	5 (**2013**, **2014**, 2016, 2018, 2020)

== Venue ==
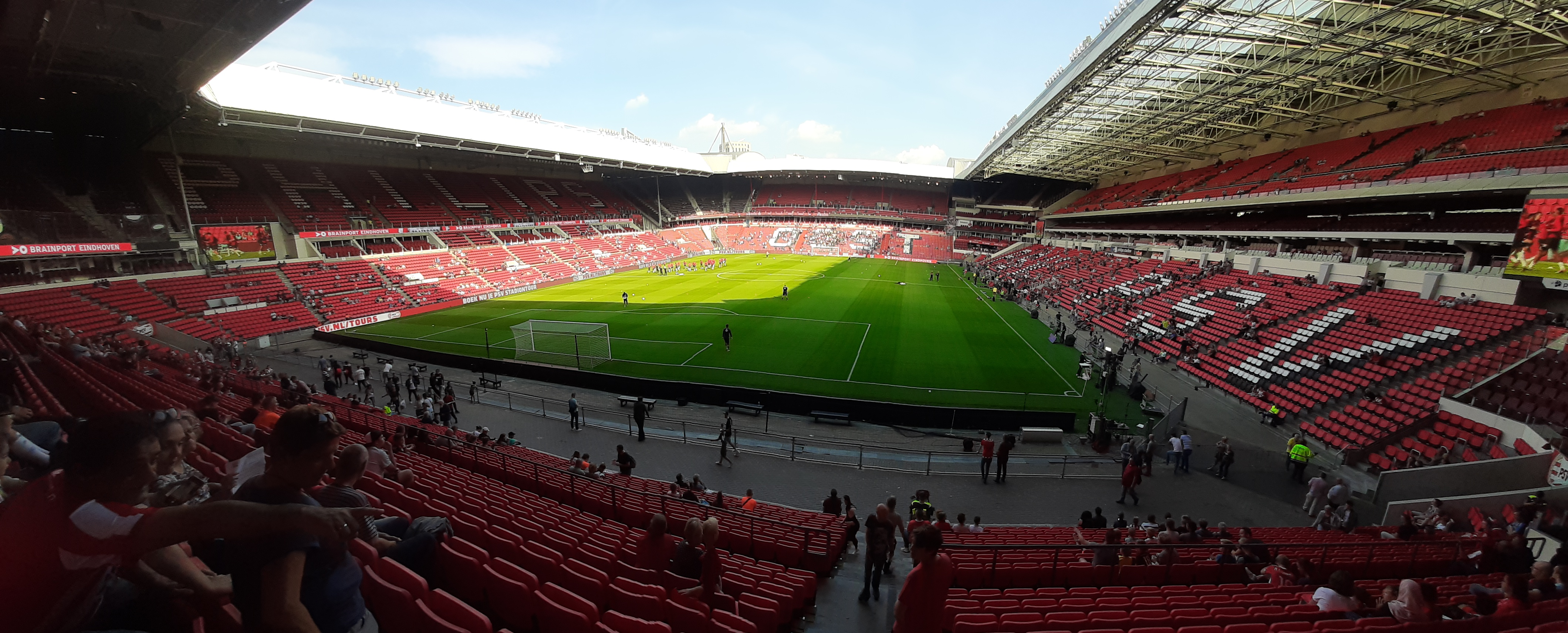
The Philips Stadion in Eindhoven hosted the final.

The Philips Stadion was selected as the final host by the UEFA Executive Committee during their meeting in Amsterdam, Netherlands on 2 March 2020.

The match was the first UEFA Women's Cup/Champions League final to be held in the Netherlands. It was also the fourth UEFA club competition final to be held at the stadium, having hosted two UEFA Cup/Europa League finals (the 1978 second leg and in 2006) and the 1988 European Super Cup second leg. The stadium was also a venue at UEFA Euro 2000, where it hosted three group stage matches.

== Route to the final ==
Note: In all results below, the score of the finalist is given first (H: home; A: away).

(Spain) Barcelona				Round	(Germany) VfL Wolfsburg			
Opponent	Result			Group stage	Opponent	Result		
(Portugal) Benfica	9–0 (H)			Matchday 1	(Austria) St. Pölten	4–0 (H)		
(Sweden) Rosengård	4–1 (A)			Matchday 2	(Czech Republic) Slavia Prague	2–0 (A)		
(Germany) Bayern Munich	3–0 (H)			Matchday 3	(Italy) Roma	1–1 (A)		
(Germany) Bayern Munich	1–3 (A)			Matchday 4	(Italy) Roma	4–2 (H)		
(Portugal) Benfica	6–2 (A)			Matchday 5	(Czech Republic) Slavia Prague	0–0 (H)		
(Sweden) Rosengård	6–0 (H)			Matchday 6	(Austria) St. Pölten	8–2 (A)		
**Group D winners**: Pos / Team / Pld / Pts; **1** / (Spain) Barcelona / **6** / **15**; 2 / (Germany) Bayern Munich / 6 / **15**; 3 / (Portugal) Benfica / 6 / **6**; 4 / (Sweden) Rosengård / 6 / **0**; Source: UEFA				Final standings	**Group B winners**: Pos / Team / Pld / Pts; **1** / (Germany) VfL Wolfsburg / **6** / **14**; 2 / (Italy) Roma / 6 / **13**; 3 / (Austria) St. Pölten / 6 / **4**; 4 / (Czech Republic) Slavia Prague / 6 / **2**; Source: UEFA			
Opponent	Agg.	1st leg	2nd leg	Knockout phase	Opponent	Agg.	1st leg	2nd leg
(Italy) Roma	6–1	1–0 (A)	5–1 (H)	Quarter-finals	(France) Paris Saint-Germain	2–1	1–0 (A)	1–1 (H)
(England) Chelsea	2–1	1–0 (A)	1–1 (H)	Semi-finals	(England) Arsenal	5–4	2–2 (H)	3–2 (a.e.t.) (A)

== Match ==
=== Details ===
The "home" team (for administrative purposes) was determined by an additional draw held on 10 February 2023 (after the quarter-final and semi-final draws) at the UEFA headquarters in Nyon, Switzerland.

3 June 2023
16:00 UTC+2

Barcelona (Spain)	3–2	(Germany) VfL Wolfsburg
Guijarro 48', 50'; Rolfö 70'	Report	Pajor 3'; Popp 37'

Philips Stadion, Eindhoven
Attendance: 33,147
Referee: Cheryl Foster (Wales)

**Barcelona**	**VfL Wolfsburg**

GK	1	(Spain) Sandra Paños (c)
RB	15	(England) Lucy Bronze
CB	2	(Spain) Irene Paredes	(yellow card) 90+4'
CB	4	(Spain) Mapi León
LB	16	(Sweden) Fridolina Rolfö
CM	14	(Spain) Aitana Bonmatí	(yellow card) 33'	(substituted off) 90'
CM	21	(England) Keira Walsh		(substituted off) 90'
CM	12	(Spain) Patricia Guijarro
RF	10	(Norway) Caroline Graham Hansen		(substituted off) 79'
CF	17	(Spain) Salma Paralluelo		(substituted off) 70'
LF	9	(Spain) Mariona Caldentey		(substituted off) 79'
Substitutes:
GK	13	(Spain) Cata Coll
DF	3	(Spain) Laia Codina
DF	5	(Spain) Jana Fernández
DF	8	(Spain) Marta Torrejón
DF	22	(Spain) Nuria Rábano
MF	11	(Spain) Alexia Putellas		(substituted on) 90'
MF	23	(Norway) Ingrid Syrstad Engen		(substituted on) 90'
MF	30	(Spain) Vicky López
FW	6	(Spain) Clàudia Pina		(substituted on) 79'
FW	7	(Switzerland) Ana-Maria Crnogorčević		(substituted on) 79'
FW	18	(Brazil) Geyse		(substituted on) 70'
FW	19	(Spain) Bruna Vilamala
Manager:
(Spain) Jonatan Giráldez

GK	1	(Germany) Merle Frohms
RB	2	(Netherlands) Lynn Wilms		(substituted off) 84'
CB	4	(Germany) Kathrin Hendrich	(yellow card) 21'
CB	6	(Netherlands) Dominique Janssen
LB	13	(Germany) Felicitas Rauch
CM	5	(Germany) Lena Oberdorf
CM	14	(Netherlands) Jill Roord		(substituted off) 71'
AM	10	(Germany) Svenja Huth (c)
RF	23	(Iceland) Sveindís Jane Jónsdóttir	(yellow card) 77'
CF	9	(Poland) Ewa Pajor		(substituted off) 84'
LF	11	(Germany) Alexandra Popp	(yellow card) 90+4'
Substitutes:
GK	30	(Germany) Lisa Weiß
GK	77	(Poland) Katarzyna Kiedrzynek
DF	3	(Slovenia) Sara Agrež
DF	24	(Germany) Joelle Wedemeyer
DF	31	(Germany) Marina Hegering		(substituted on) 84'
MF	8	(Germany) Lena Lattwein		(substituted on) 71'
MF	17	(Germany) Kristin Demann
MF	20	(Germany) Pia-Sophie Wolter
MF	29	(Germany) Jule Brand
FW	7	(Germany) Pauline Bremer		(substituted on) 84'
FW	21	(Sweden) Rebecka Blomqvist
FW	28	(Germany) Tabea Waßmuth
Manager:
(Germany) Tommy Stroot

Player of the Match:
Patricia Guijarro (Barcelona)

Assistant referees:
Michelle O'Neill (Republic of Ireland)
Franca Overtoom (Netherlands)
Fourth official:
Rebecca Welch (England)
Reserve assistant referee:
Natalie Aspinall (England)
Video assistant referee:
Massimiliano Irrati (Italy)
Assistant video assistant referee:
Sian Massey-Ellis (England)
Support video assistant referee:
Maria Sole Ferrieri Caputi (Italy)

**Match rules**

- 90 minutes.
- 30 minutes of extra time if necessary.
- Penalty shoot-out if scores still level.
- Twelve named substitutes.
- Maximum of five substitutions, with a sixth allowed in extra time. (Note: Each team was given only three opportunities to make substitutions, with a fourth opportunity in extra time, excluding substitutions made at half-time, before the start of extra time and at half-time in extra time.)

=== Statistics ===
First half
Statistic	Barcelona	VfL Wolfsburg
Goals scored	0	2
Total shots	16	3
Shots on target	2	3
Saves	1	2
Ball possession	59%	41%
Corner kicks	3	0
Fouls committed	4	7
Offsides	1	0
Yellow cards	1	1
Red cards	0	0

Second half
Statistic	Barcelona	VfL Wolfsburg
Goals scored	3	0
Total shots	10	5
Shots on target	5	3
Saves	3	2
Ball possession	63%	37%
Corner kicks	2	1
Fouls committed	3	6
Offsides	1	1
Yellow cards	1	2
Red cards	0	0

Overall
Statistic	Barcelona	VfL Wolfsburg
Goals scored	3	2
Total shots	26	8
Shots on target	7	6
Saves	4	4
Ball possession	61%	39%
Corner kicks	5	1
Fouls committed	7	13
Offsides	2	1
Yellow cards	2	3
Red cards	0	0

== See also ==
- 2022–23 FC Barcelona Femení season
- 2023 UEFA Champions League final
- 2023 UEFA Europa League final
- 2023 UEFA Europa Conference League final
- 2023 UEFA Super Cup
