= 2022–23 UEFA Women's Champions League =

22nd edition of top European women's football competition

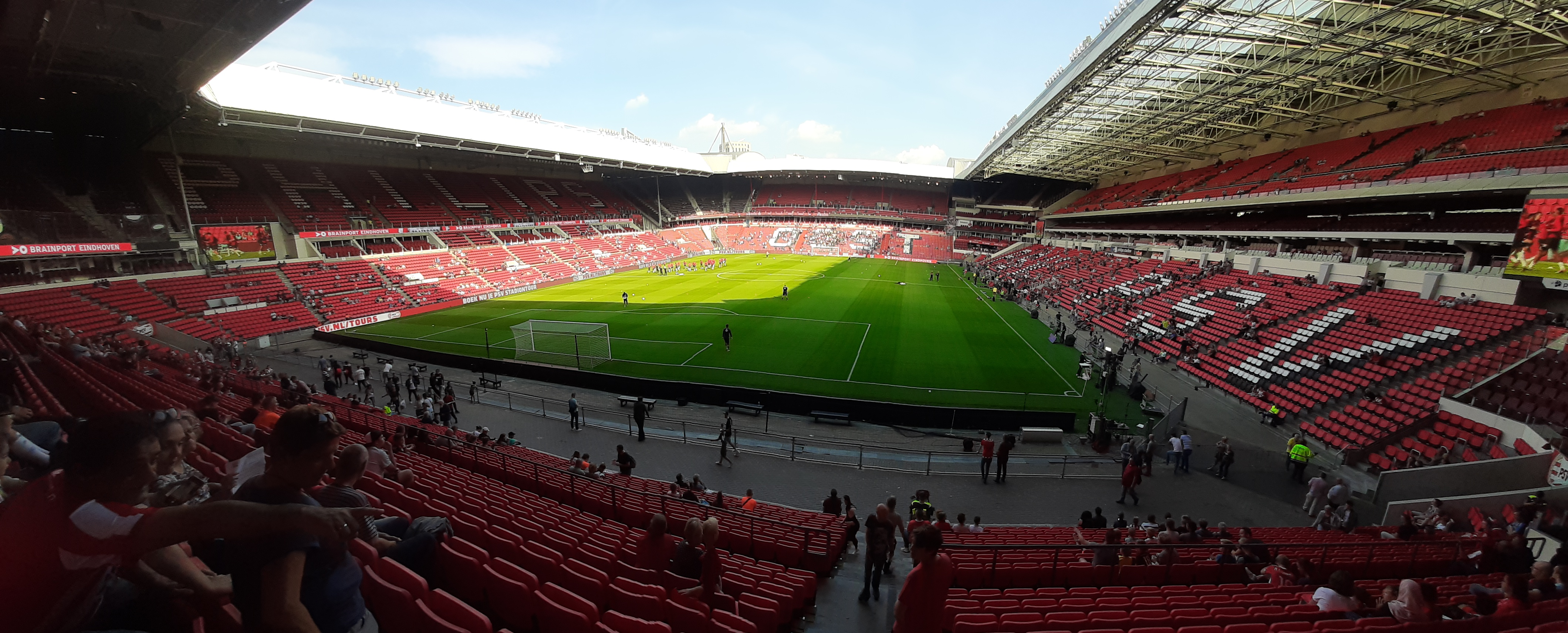
- The Philips Stadion in Eindhoven hosted the final.

Tournament details
- Dates: Qualifying rounds: 18 August – 29 September 2022; Competition proper: 19 October 2022 – 3 June 2023
- Teams: Competition proper: 16; Total: 71 (from 50 associations)

Final positions
- Champions: (Spain) Barcelona (2nd title)
- Runners-up: (Germany) VfL Wolfsburg

Tournament statistics
- Matches played: 61
- Goals scored: 211 (3.46 per match)
- Attendance: 681,175 (11,167 per match)
- Top scorer(s): Ewa Pajor (VfL Wolfsburg); 9 goals
- Best player: Aitana Bonmatí (Barcelona)
- Best young player: Lena Oberdorf (VfL Wolfsburg)

The 2022–23 UEFA Women's Champions League was the 22nd edition of the European women's club football championship organised by UEFA, and the 14th edition since being rebranded as the UEFA Women's Champions League. It was the second edition to feature a 16-team group stage.

The final was held at the Philips Stadion in Eindhoven, Netherlands. The winners of the 2022–23 UEFA Women's Champions League automatically qualified for the 2023–24 UEFA Women's Champions League group stage.

Lyon were the defending champions, having won a record-extending eighth title after winning the 2022 final. They were unable to defend their title after being defeated by Chelsea in the quarter-finals.

Barcelona won their second title by defeating VfL Wolfsburg 3–2 in the final.

== Association team allocation ==
The association ranking based on the UEFA women's Association coefficients was used to determine the number of participating teams for each association:

- Associations 1–6 each had three teams qualify.
- Associations 7–16 each had two teams qualify.
- All other associations (except Russia), if they entered, each have one team qualify.
- The winners of the 2021–22 UEFA Women's Champions League were given an additional entry if they did not qualify for the 2022–23 UEFA Women's Champions League through their domestic league.

An association had to have an eleven-a-side women's domestic league to enter a team. As of 2019–20, 52 of the 55 UEFA member associations organized a women's domestic league, with the exceptions being Andorra (1 club in Spain), Liechtenstein (3 clubs in Switzerland) and San Marino (1 club in Italy).

=== Association ranking ===
For the 2022–23 UEFA Women's Champions League, the associations were allocated places according to their 2021 UEFA Women's Association coefficients, which took into account their performance in European competitions from 2016–2017 to 2020–2021.

Association ranking for 2022–23 UEFA Women's Champions League

Rank	Association	Coeff.	Teams
1	France	92.000	3
2	Germany	75.500	3
3	England	68.500	3
4	Spain	64.000	3
5	Sweden	40.500	3
6	Czech Republic	36.500	3
7	Denmark	34.500	2
8	Netherlands	30.000	2
9	Kazakhstan	28.500	2
10	Italy	26.000	2
11	Iceland	25.000	2
12	Norway	24.000	2
13	Scotland	23.000	2
14	Switzerland	23.000	2
15	Belarus	21.000	2
16	Austria	20.000	2
17	Russia	17.500	0
18	Cyprus	16.000	1
19	Lithuania	15.500	1

Rank	Association	Coeff.	Teams
20	Serbia	14.500	1
21	Poland	14.500	1
22	Ukraine	13.000	1
23	Portugal	13.000	1
24	Bosnia and Herzegovina	12.000	1
25	Belgium	11.500	1
26	Romania	10.000	1
27	Albania	9.000	1
28	Hungary	9.000	1
29	Finland	8.500	1
30	Turkey	7.500	1
31	Greece	7.500	1
32	Slovenia	7.000	1
33	Croatia	7.000	1
34	Republic of Ireland	6.500	1
35	Kosovo	5.000	1
36	Slovakia	5.000	1
37	Israel	5.000	1

Rank	Association	Coeff.	Teams
38	Bulgaria	4.500	1
39	Wales	4.500	1
40	Estonia	4.500	1
41	Montenegro	4.000	1
42	Georgia	3.000	1
43	Faroe Islands	3.000	1
44	Northern Ireland	2.000	1
45	Malta	1.500	1
46	Moldova	1.500	1
47	Latvia	1.000	1
48	North Macedonia	1.000	1
49	Luxembourg	1.000	1
50	Armenia	1.000	1
NR	Azerbaijan	—	DNE
NR	Gibraltar	—	DNE
NR	Andorra	—	NL
NR	Liechtenstein	—	NL
NR	San Marino	—	NL

Notes

- NR – No rank (association did not enter in any of the seasons used for computing coefficients)
- DNE – Did not enter
- NL – No women's domestic league

=== Distribution ===
Access list for 2022–23 UEFA Women's Champions League
	Path	Teams entering in this round	Teams advancing from previous round
Round 1 (Mini-Tournament)	Champions Path (42 Teams)	42 champions from associations 8–50 (except Russia)	
Round 1 (Mini-Tournament)	League Path (16 Teams)	6 third-placed teams from associations 1–6; 10 second-placed teams from associations 7–16	
Round 2	Champions Path (14 Teams)	3 champions from associations 5–7	11 knockout winners of the previous round
Round 2	League Path (10 Teams)	6 second-placed teams from associations 1–6	4 knockout winners of the previous round
Group Stage (16 Teams)		4 champions from associations 1–4 (including title holders Lyon)	7 knockout winners of the Champions Path; 5 knockout winners of the League Path
Knockout Stage (8 Teams)			4 group winners from group stage; 4 group runners-up from group stage

=== Teams ===
The labels in the parentheses show how each team qualified for the place of its starting round:

- TH: Title holders
- 1st, second, third: League positions of the previous season
- Abd-: League positions of abandoned season as determined by the national association

The two qualifying rounds, round 1 and round 2, were divided into Champions Path (CH) and League Path (LP).

CC: 2022 UEFA women's club coefficients.

Qualified teams for 2022–23 UEFA Women's Champions League
Entry round		Teams			
GS		(France) Lyon (1st)^{TH}	(Germany) VfL Wolfsburg (1st)	(England) Chelsea (1st)	(Spain) Barcelona (1st)
Round 2	CH	(Sweden) Rosengård (1st)	(Czech Republic) Slavia Prague (1st)	(Denmark) HB Køge (1st)	
Round 2	LP	(France) Paris Saint-Germain (2nd)	(Germany) Bayern Munich (2nd)	(England) Arsenal (2nd)	(Spain) Real Sociedad (2nd)
Round 2	LP	(Sweden) BK Häcken (2nd)	(Czech Republic) Sparta Prague (2nd)		
Round 1	CH	(Netherlands) Twente (1st)	(Kazakhstan) BIIK Kazygurt (1st)	(Italy) Juventus (1st)	(Iceland) Valur (1st)
Round 1	CH	(Norway) Brann (1st)	(Scotland) Rangers (1st)	(Switzerland) Zürich (1st)	(Belarus) Dinamo-BGU Minsk (1st)
Round 1	CH	(Austria) St. Pölten (1st)	(Cyprus) Apollon Limassol (1st)	(Lithuania) Gintra (1st)	(Serbia) Spartak Subotica (1st)
Round 1	CH	(Poland) UKS SMS Łódź (1st)	(Ukraine) Vorskla Poltava (Abd-1st)	(Portugal) Benfica (1st)	(Bosnia and Herzegovina) SFK 2000 (1st)
Round 1	CH	(Belgium) Anderlecht (1st)	(Romania) U Olimpia Cluj (1st)	(Albania) Vllaznia (1st)	(Hungary) Ferencváros (1st)
Round 1	CH	(Finland) KuPS (1st)	(Turkey) ALG Spor (1st)	(Greece) PAOK (1st)	(Slovenia) Pomurje (1st)
Round 1	CH	(Croatia) Split (1st)	(Republic of Ireland) Shelbourne (1st)	(Kosovo) EP-COM Hajvalia (1st)	(Slovakia) Spartak Myjava (1st)
Round 1	CH	(Israel) Kiryat Gat (1st)	(Bulgaria) Lokomotiv Stara Zagora (1st)	(Wales) Swansea City (1st)	(Estonia) Flora (1st)
Round 1	CH	(Montenegro) Breznica (1st)	(Georgia (country)) Lanchkhuti (1st)	(Faroe Islands) KÍ (1st)	(Northern Ireland) Glentoran (1st)
Round 1	CH	(Malta) Birkirkara (1st)	(Moldova) Agarista-ȘS Anenii Noi (2nd)	(Latvia) Rīgas FS (1st)	(North Macedonia) Ljuboten (1st)
Round 1	CH	(Luxembourg) Union FC (1st)	(Armenia) Hayasa (1st)		
Round 1	LP	(France) Paris FC (3rd)	(Germany) Eintracht Frankfurt (3rd)	(England) Manchester City (3rd)	(Spain) Real Madrid (3rd)
Round 1	LP	(Sweden) Kristianstads DFF (3rd)	(Czech Republic) Slovácko (3rd)	(Denmark) Fortuna Hjørring (2nd)	(Netherlands) Ajax (2nd)
Round 1	LP	(Kazakhstan) Tomiris-Turan (2nd)	(Italy) Roma (2nd)	(Iceland) Breiðablik (2nd)	(Norway) Rosenborg (2nd)
Round 1	LP	(Scotland) Glasgow City (2nd)	(Switzerland) Servette (2nd)	(Belarus) Minsk (2nd)	(Austria) Sturm Graz (2nd)

Notes

1. Russia (RUS): On 28 February 2022, Russian football clubs and national teams were suspended from FIFA and UEFA competitions due to the 2022 Russian invasion of Ukraine. On 2 May 2022, UEFA confirmed that Russian clubs would be excluded from the 2022–23 UEFA competitions.
2. Ukraine (UKR): The 2021–22 Ukrainian Women's League was abandoned due to the 2022 Russian invasion of Ukraine (24 February 2022). The top team of the league at the time of the abandonment (mid-season), Vorskla Poltava, were selected to play in the 2022–23 UEFA Women's Champions League by the Ukrainian Association of Football, entering round 1.

== Schedule ==
The schedule of the competition was as follows.

Schedule for 2022–23 UEFA Women's Champions League
Phase	Round	Draw date	First leg	Second leg
Qualifying	First round	24 June 2022	18 August 2022 (semi-finals)	21 August 2022 (third-place play-off & final)
Qualifying	Second round	1 September 2022	20–21 September 2022	28–29 September 2022
Group stage	Matchday 1	3 October 2022	19–20 October 2022	
Group stage	Matchday 2	3 October 2022	26–27 October 2022	
Group stage	Matchday 3	3 October 2022	23–24 November 2022	
Group stage	Matchday 4	3 October 2022	7–8 December 2022	
Group stage	Matchday 5	3 October 2022	15–16 December 2022	
Group stage	Matchday 6	3 October 2022	21–22 December 2022	
Knockout phase	Quarter-finals	10 February 2023	21–22 March 2023	29–30 March 2023
Knockout phase	Semi-finals	10 February 2023	22–23 April 2023	27 April, 1 May 2023
Knockout phase	Final	10 February 2023	3 June 2023 at Philips Stadion, Eindhoven	

== Qualifying rounds ==
=== Round 1 ===
The draw for Round 1 was held on 24 June 2022. A total of 58 teams played in Round 1.

==== Champions Path ====
Tournament 1

Hosted by Pomurje.

Semi-finals
18 August
(Iceland) Valur	2
(Armenia) Hayasa	0
18 August
(Slovenia) Pomurje	0
(Republic of Ireland) Shelbourne	1

Final
21 August
(Iceland) Valur	3
(Republic of Ireland) Shelbourne	0
Third place
21 August
(Armenia) Hayasa	1
(Slovenia) Pomurje	2

Tournament 2

Hosted by PAOK.

Semi-finals
18 August
(Greece) PAOK	2
(Wales) Swansea City	0
18 August
(Hungary) Ferencváros	1
(Scotland) Rangers	3

Final
21 August
(Greece) PAOK	0
(Scotland) Rangers	4
Third place
21 August
(Wales) Swansea City	0
(Hungary) Ferencváros	7

Tournament 3

Hosted by Split.

Semi-finals
18 August
(Ukraine) Vorskla-Kharkiv-2	5
(Georgia (country)) Lanchkhuti	0
18 August
(Kazakhstan) BIIK Kazygurt	5
(Croatia) Split	1

Final
21 August
(Ukraine) Vorskla-Kharkiv-2	2
(Kazakhstan) BIIK Kazygurt	0
Third place
21 August
(Georgia (country)) Lanchkhuti	0
(Croatia) Split	2

Tournament 4

Hosted by Apollon Limassol.

Semi-finals
18 August
(Cyprus) Apollon Limassol	3
(Latvia) Rīgas FS	0
18 August
(Switzerland) Zürich	6
(Faroe Islands) KÍ	0

Final
21 August
(Cyprus) Apollon Limassol	0
(Switzerland) Zürich	1
Third place
21 August
(Latvia) Rīgas FS (a.e.t.)	2
(Faroe Islands) KÍ	1

Tournament 5

Hosted by UKS SMS Łódź.

Semi-finals
18 August
(Lithuania) Gintra	0
(Finland) KuPS	2
18 August
(Belgium) Anderlecht	3
(Poland) UKS SMS Łódź	2

Final
21 August
(Finland) KuPS (a.e.t.) (p)	2 (4)
(Belgium) Anderlecht	2 (3)
Third place
21 August
(Lithuania) Gintra	0
(Poland) UKS SMS Łódź	1

Tournament 6

Hosted by Juventus.

Semi-finals
18 August
(Estonia) Flora	0
(Israel) Kiryat Gat	5
18 August
(Italy) Juventus	4
(Luxembourg) Union FC	0

Final
21 August
(Israel) Kiryat Gat	1
(Italy) Juventus	3
Third place
21 August
(Estonia) Flora	1
(Luxembourg) Union FC	3

Tournament 7

Hosted by U Olimpia Cluj.

Semi-finals
18 August
(Bosnia and Herzegovina) SFK 2000	4
(Malta) Birkirkara	0
18 August
(Romania) U Olimpia Cluj (a.e.t.) (p)	0 (4)
(Northern Ireland) Glentoran	0 (2)

Final
21 August
(Bosnia and Herzegovina) SFK 2000	2
(Romania) U Olimpia Cluj	1
Third place
21 August
(Malta) Birkirkara	2
(Northern Ireland) Glentoran	1

Tournament 8

Hosted by Twente.

Semi-finals
18 August
(Portugal) Benfica	9
(Kosovo) EP-COM Hajvalia	0
18 August
(Netherlands) Twente	13
(Moldova) Agarista-ȘS Anenii Noi	0

Final
21 August
(Portugal) Benfica	2
(Netherlands) Twente	1
Third place
21 August
(Kosovo) EP-COM Hajvalia	7
(Moldova) Agarista-ȘS Anenii Noi	0

Tournament 9

Hosted by Ljuboten.

Semi-finals
18 August
(Belarus) Dinamo-BGU Minsk	5
(Bulgaria) Lokomotiv Stara Zagora	0
18 August
(Austria) St. Pölten	7
(North Macedonia) Ljuboten	0

Final
21 August
(Belarus) Dinamo-BGU Minsk	0
(Austria) St. Pölten	3
Third place
21 August
(Bulgaria) Lokomotiv Stara Zagora	5
(North Macedonia) Ljuboten	1

Tournament 10

Hosted by Breznica.

Semi-finals
18 August
(Montenegro) Breznica	2
(Slovakia) Spartak Myjava	3

Final
21 August
(Slovakia) Spartak Myjava	0
(Albania) Vllaznia	1

Tournament 11

Hosted by Spartak Subotica.

Semi-finals
18 August
(Norway) Brann	1
(Turkey) ALG Spor	0

Final
21 August
(Norway) Brann	3
(Serbia) Spartak Subotica	1

==== League Path ====
Tournament 1

Hosted by Glasgow City.

Semi-finals
18 August
(France) Paris FC	3
(Switzerland) Servette	0
18 August
(Scotland) Glasgow City	1
(Italy) Roma	3

Final
21 August
(France) Paris FC	0 (4)
(Italy) Roma (a.e.t.) (p)	0 (5)
Third place
21 August
(Switzerland) Servette	1
(Scotland) Glasgow City	0

Tournament 2

Hosted by Rosenborg.

Semi-finals
18 August
(Belarus) FC Minsk	2
(Czech Republic) Slovácko	1
18 August
(Iceland) Breiðablik	2
(Norway) Rosenborg	4

Final
21 August
(Belarus) FC Minsk	0
(Norway) Rosenborg	1
Third place
21 August
(Czech Republic) Slovácko	0
(Iceland) Breiðablik	3

Tournament 3

Hosted by Fortuna Hjørring.

Semi-finals
18 August
(Netherlands) Ajax	3
(Sweden) Kristianstads DFF	1
18 August
(Denmark) Fortuna Hjørring	0
(Germany) Eintracht Frankfurt	2

Final
21 August
(Netherlands) Ajax	2
(Germany) Eintracht Frankfurt	1
Third place
21 August
(Sweden) Kristianstads DFF (a.e.t.)	3
(Denmark) Fortuna Hjørring	2

Tournament 4

Hosted by Real Madrid.

Semi-finals
18 August
(England) Manchester City	6
(Kazakhstan) Tomiris-Turan	0
18 August
(Spain) Real Madrid	6
(Austria) Sturm Graz	0

Final
21 August
(England) Manchester City	0
(Spain) Real Madrid	1
Third place
21 August
(Austria) Sturm Graz	5
(Kazakhstan) Tomiris-Turan	1

=== Round 2 ===
The draw for Round 2 was held on 1 September 2022. The first legs were played on 20 and 21 September 2022, and the second legs were played on 28 and 29 September 2022.

The winners of the ties advanced to the group stage.

Champions Path
Team 1	Agg.	Team 2	1st leg	2nd leg
Vorskla Poltava (Ukraine)	2–3	(Albania) Vllaznia	1–1	1–2
SFK 2000 (Bosnia and Herzegovina)	0–10	(Switzerland) Zürich	0–7	0–3
Rangers (Scotland)	3–5	(Portugal) Benfica	2–3	1–2 (a.e.t.)
KuPS (Finland)	2–3	(Austria) St. Pölten	0–1	2–2 (a.e.t.)
Valur (Iceland)	0–1	(Czech Republic) Slavia Prague	0–1	0–0
Brann (Norway)	2–4	(Sweden) Rosengård	1–1	1–3
HB Køge (Denmark)	1–3	(Italy) Juventus	1–1	0–2

League Path
Team 1	Agg.	Team 2	1st leg	2nd leg
Arsenal (England)	3–2	(Netherlands) Ajax	2–2	1–0
Paris Saint-Germain (France)	4–1	(Sweden) BK Häcken	2–1	2–0
Real Sociedad (Spain)	1–4	(Germany) Bayern Munich	0–1	1–3
Rosenborg (Norway)	1–5	(Spain) Real Madrid	0–3	1–2
Sparta Prague (Czech Republic)	2–6	(Italy) Roma	1–2	1–4

== Group stage ==
The draw was held 3 October 2022 and saw the 16 teams split into four pools of four teams.

Location of teams of the 2022–23 UEFA Women's Champions League group stage.
Brown: Group A; Red: Group B; Orange: Group C; Yellow: Group D.

=== Group A ===
Pos	Team	Pld	W	D	L	GF	GA	GD	Pts	Qualification	CHE	PAR	MAD	VLL
1	(England) Chelsea	6	5	1	0	19	1	+18	16	Advance to Quarter-finals	—	3–0	2–0	8–0
2	(France) Paris Saint-Germain	6	3	1	2	11	5	+6	10	Advance to Quarter-finals	0–1	—	2–1	5–0
3	(Spain) Real Madrid	6	2	2	2	9	6	+3	8		1–1	0–0	—	5–1
4	(Albania) Vllaznia	6	0	0	6	1	28	−27	0		0–4	0–4	0–2	—

Source: UEFA
Rules for classification: Group stage tiebreakers

=== Group B ===
Pos	Team	Pld	W	D	L	GF	GA	GD	Pts	Qualification	WOL	ROM	PÖL	PRA
1	(Germany) VfL Wolfsburg	6	4	2	0	19	5	+14	14	Advance to Quarter-finals	—	4–2	4–0	0–0
2	(Italy) Roma	6	4	1	1	16	8	+8	13	Advance to Quarter-finals	1–1	—	5–0	1–0
3	(Austria) St. Pölten	6	1	1	4	7	22	−15	4		2–8	3–4	—	1–1
4	(Czech Republic) Slavia Prague	6	0	2	4	1	8	−7	2		0–2	0–3	0–1	—

Source: UEFA
Rules for classification: Group stage tiebreakers

=== Group C ===
Pos	Team	Pld	W	D	L	GF	GA	GD	Pts	Qualification	ARS	LYO	JUV	ZÜR
1	(England) Arsenal	6	4	1	1	19	5	+14	13	Advance to Quarter-finals	—	0–1	1–0	3–1
2	(France) Lyon	6	3	2	1	10	6	+4	11	Advance to Quarter-finals	1–5	—	0–0	4–0
3	(Italy) Juventus	6	2	3	1	9	3	+6	9		1–1	1–1	—	5–0
4	(Switzerland) Zürich	6	0	0	6	2	26	−24	0		1–9	0–3	0–2	—

Source: UEFA
Rules for classification: Group stage tiebreakers

=== Group D ===
Pos	Team	Pld	W	D	L	GF	GA	GD	Pts	Qualification	BAR	MUN	BEN	ROS
1	(Spain) Barcelona	6	5	0	1	29	6	+23	15 (Note: Tied on head-to-head points. Head-to-head goal difference: Barcelona +1, Bayern Munich −1.)	Advance to Quarter-finals	—	3–0	9–0	6–0
2	(Germany) Bayern Munich	6	5	0	1	14	7	+7	15	Advance to Quarter-finals	3–1	—	2–0	2–1
3	(Portugal) Benfica	6	2	0	4	8	21	−13	6		2–6	2–3	—	1–0
4	(Sweden) Rosengård	6	0	0	6	3	20	−17	0		1–4	0–4	1–3	—

Source: UEFA
Rules for classification: Group stage tiebreakers

== Knockout phase ==
In the knockout phase, teams played against each other over two legs on a home-and-away basis, except for the one-match final. The mechanism of the draws for each round was as follows:

- In the draw for the quarter-finals, the four group winners were seeded, and the four group runners-up were unseeded. The seeded teams were drawn against the unseeded teams, and the seeded teams hosted the second leg. Teams from the same group could not be drawn against each other.
- A draw was also held to determine which semi-final winner was designated as the "home" team for the final (for administrative purposes as it was played at a neutral venue).

=== Bracket ===
Quarter-finals
(France) Lyon	0	2	2 (3)
(England) Chelsea (p)	1	1	2 (4)
(Italy) Roma	0	1	1
(Spain) Barcelona	1	5	6
(France) Paris Saint-Germain	0	1	1
(Germany) VfL Wolfsburg	1	1	2
(Germany) Bayern Munich	1	0	1
(England) Arsenal	0	2	2

Semi-finals
(England) Chelsea	0	1	1
(Spain) Barcelona	1	1	2
(Germany) VfL Wolfsburg (a.e.t.)	2	3	5
(England) Arsenal	2	2	4

Final
3 June – Eindhoven
(Spain) Barcelona	3
(Germany) VfL Wolfsburg	2

=== Quarter-finals ===
The draw for the quarter-finals was held on 10 February 2023. The first legs were played on 21 and 22 March, and the second legs were played on 29 and 30 March 2023.

Team 1	Agg.	Team 2	1st leg	2nd leg
Bayern Munich (Germany)	1–2	(England) Arsenal	1–0	0–2
Lyon (France)	2–2 (3–4 p)	(England) Chelsea	0–1	2–1 (a.e.t.)
Roma (Italy)	1–6	(Spain) Barcelona	0–1	1–5
Paris Saint-Germain (France)	1–2	(Germany) VfL Wolfsburg	0–1	1–1

=== Semi-finals ===
The draw for the semi-finals was held on 10 February 2023 (after the quarter-final draw). The first legs were played on 22 and 23 April, and the second legs were played on 27 April and 1 May 2023.

Team 1	Agg.	Team 2	1st leg	2nd leg
VfL Wolfsburg (Germany)	5–4	(England) Arsenal	2–2	3–2 (a.e.t.)
Chelsea (England)	1–2	(Spain) Barcelona	0–1	1–1

=== Final ===
The final was played on 3 June 2023 at the Philips Stadion, Eindhoven. A draw was held on 10 February 2023 (after the quarter-final and semi-final draws), to determine which semi-final winner would be designated as the "home" team for administrative purposes.

3 June 2023
16:00 UTC+2

Barcelona (Spain)	3–2	(Germany) VfL Wolfsburg
Guijarro 48', 50'; Rolfö 70'	Report	Pajor 3'; Popp 37'

Philips Stadion, Eindhoven
Attendance: 33,147
Referee: Cheryl Foster (Wales)

== Statistics ==
Statistics exclude qualifying rounds.

=== Top goalscorers ===
Rank	Player	Team	Goals
1	(Poland) Ewa Pajor	(Germany) VfL Wolfsburg	9
2	(Canada) Cloé Lacasse	(Portugal) Benfica	5
2	(Australia) Sam Kerr	(England) Chelsea	5
2	(Sweden) Stina Blackstenius	(England) Arsenal	5
2	(Norway) Frida Maanum	(England) Arsenal	5
2	(Nigeria) Asisat Oshoala	(Spain) Barcelona	5
2	(Spain) Aitana Bonmatí	(Spain) Barcelona	5
8	(Spain) Mariona Caldentey	(Spain) Barcelona	4
8	(France) Kadidiatou Diani	(France) Paris Saint-Germain	4
8	(Australia) Caitlin Foord	(England) Arsenal	4
8	(Brazil) Geyse	(Spain) Barcelona	4
8	(Italy) Valentina Giacinti	(Italy) Roma	4
8	(Italy) Cristiana Girelli	(Italy) Juventus	4
8	(Spain) Patricia Guijarro	(Spain) Barcelona	4
8	(France) Melvine Malard	(France) Lyon	4
8	(Sweden) Fridolina Rolfö	(Spain) Barcelona	4

=== Team of the season ===
The UEFA technical study group selected the following players as the team of the tournament.

Pos.	Player	Team
GK	(Germany) Merle Frohms	(Germany) VfL Wolfsburg
DF	(England) Lucy Bronze	(Spain) Barcelona
DF	(Spain) Irene Paredes	(Spain) Barcelona
DF	(Spain) Mapi León	(Spain) Barcelona
DF	(Republic of Ireland) Katie McCabe	(England) Arsenal
MF	(Spain) Aitana Bonmatí	(Spain) Barcelona
MF	(Germany) Lena Oberdorf	(Germany) VfL Wolfsburg
MF	(Spain) Patricia Guijarro	(Spain) Barcelona
FW	(Norway) Caroline Graham Hansen	(Spain) Barcelona
FW	(Germany) Alexandra Popp	(Germany) VfL Wolfsburg
FW	(Poland) Ewa Pajor	(Germany) VfL Wolfsburg

=== Player of the season ===
- (Spain) Aitana Bonmatí ( (Spain) Barcelona)

=== Young player of the season ===
- (Germany) Lena Oberdorf ( (Germany) VfL Wolfsburg)

== See also ==
- 2022–23 UEFA Champions League
