= 2021–22 ÖFB-Frauenliga =

ÖFB-Frauenliga
- Season: 2021–22
- UEFA Women's Champions League: SKN St. Pölten; SK Sturm Graz
- Matches: 90
- Goals: 373 (4.14 per match)
- Top goalscorer: Annabel Schasching (15 goals)

The 2021–22 ÖFB-Frauenliga is the 50th season of the women's football top level league in Austria. SKN St. Pölten are the defending champion, having won their 6th consecutive title in the previous season.

== Standings ==
Pos	Team	Pld	W	D	L	GF	GA	GD	Pts	Qualification or relegation
1	SKN St. Pölten (Q)	18	17	1	0	73	1	+72	52	2022–23 UEFA Women's Champions League
2	SK Sturm Graz (Q)	18	15	2	1	59	17	+42	47	2022–23 UEFA Women's Champions League
3	FK Austria Wien	18	11	2	5	49	22	+27	35	
4	First Vienna FC	18	10	2	6	46	19	+27	32	
5	SV Neulengbach	18	9	2	7	42	31	+11	29	
6	SPG SC Rheindorf Altach/FFC Vorderland	18	7	6	5	34	28	+6	27	
7	SKV Altenmarkt	18	3	3	12	19	43	−24	12	
8	FC Wacker Innsbruck	18	3	1	14	15	52	−37	10	
9	FC Bergheim	18	3	0	15	22	65	−43	9	
10	FC Südburgenland	18	2	1	15	14	95	−81	7	Relegation to 2. Frauenliga

Rules for classification: 1) Points; 2) Goal difference; 3) Number of goals scored; 4) Head-to-head points; 5) Head-to-head goal difference; 6) Head-to-head away goals scored
(Q) Qualified for the phase indicated

== Top scorers ==
Five players have scored 10 or more goals.

1. Annabel Schasching (SK Sturm Graz) 15
2. Mateja Zver (SKN St. Pölten) 13
3. Sarah Mattner-Trembleau (First Vienna FC) 12
4. Stefanie Enzinger (SKN St. Pölten) 11
5. Karina Bauer (FK Austria Wien) 10
6. Melanie Brunnthaler (SKN St. Pölten) 10
7. Linda Mittermair (SV Neulengbach) 10
