= 2022–23 UEFA Women's Champions League knockout phase =

Tournament details
- Dates: 21 March – 3 June 2023
- Teams: 8

The 2022–23 UEFA Women's Champions League knockout phase started on 21 March 2023 with the quarter-finals and ended with the final on 3 June 2023 at the Philips Stadion in Eindhoven, Netherlands, to decide the champions of the 2022–23 UEFA Women's Champions League.

== Schedule ==
The schedule of the competition was as follows (all draws were held at the UEFA headquarters in Nyon, Switzerland).

Round	Draw date	First leg	Second leg
Quarter-finals	10 February 2023	21–22 March 2023	29–30 March 2023
Semi-finals	10 February 2023	22–23 April 2023	27 April, 1 May 2023
Final	10 February 2023	3 June 2023 at Philips Stadion, Eindhoven	

== Qualified teams ==
The knockout phase involved the eight teams which qualified as winners and runners-up of each of the four groups in the group stage.

Group	Winners (seeded in quarter finals draw)	Runners-up (unseeded in quarter finals draw)
A	(England) Chelsea	(France) Paris Saint-Germain
B	(Germany) VfL Wolfsburg	(Italy) Roma
C	(England) Arsenal	(France) Lyon
D	(Spain) Barcelona	(Germany) Bayern Munich

== Bracket ==
Quarter-finals
(France) Lyon	0	2	2 (3)
(England) Chelsea (p)	1	1	2 (4)
(Italy) Roma	0	1	1
(Spain) Barcelona	1	5	6
(France) Paris Saint-Germain	0	1	1
(Germany) VfL Wolfsburg	1	1	2
(Germany) Bayern Munich	1	0	1
(England) Arsenal	0	2	2

Semi-finals
(England) Chelsea	0	1	1
(Spain) Barcelona	1	1	2
(Germany) VfL Wolfsburg (a.e.t.)	2	3	5
(England) Arsenal	2	2	4

Final
3 June – Eindhoven
(Spain) Barcelona	3
(Germany) VfL Wolfsburg	2

== Quarter-finals ==
The draw for the quarter-finals was held on 10 February 2023.

=== Summary ===
The first legs were played on 21 and 22 March, and the second legs were played on 29 and 30 March 2023.

Team 1	Agg.	Team 2	1st leg	2nd leg
Bayern Munich (Germany)	1–2	(England) Arsenal	1–0	0–2
Lyon (France)	2–2 (3–4 p)	(England) Chelsea	0–1	2–1 (a.e.t.)
Roma (Italy)	1–6	(Spain) Barcelona	0–1	1–5
Paris Saint-Germain (France)	1–2	(Germany) VfL Wolfsburg	0–1	1–1

=== Matches ===
21 March 2023
18:45

Bayern Munich (Germany)	1–0	(England) Arsenal
Schüller 39'	Report

Allianz Arena, Munich
Attendance: 20,000
Referee: Ivana Projkovska (North Macedonia)
29 March 2023
21:00

Arsenal (England)	2–0	(Germany) Bayern Munich
Maanum 20'; Blackstenius 26'	Report

Emirates Stadium, London
Attendance: 21,307
Referee: Marta Huerta de Aza (Spain)

Arsenal won 2–1 on aggregate.

22 March 2023
18:45

Lyon (France)	0–1	(England) Chelsea
	Report	Reiten 28'

Parc Olympique Lyonnais, Décines-Charpieu
Attendance: 18,751
Referee: Tess Olofsson (Sweden)
30 March 2023
21:00

Chelsea (England)	1–2 (a.e.t.)	(France) Lyon
Mjelde 120+8' (pen.)	Report	Gilles 77'; Däbritz 110'
Penalties
Mjelde (penalty scored); Kerr (penalty scored); Fleming (penalty scored); James (penalty missed); Carter (penalty scored)	4–3	(penalty scored) Marozsán; (penalty scored) Hegerberg; (penalty missed) Renard; (penalty scored) Däbritz; (penalty missed) Horan

Stamford Bridge, London
Attendance: 15,111
Referee: Ivana Martinčić (Croatia)

2–2 on aggregate. Chelsea won 4–3 on penalties.

21 March 2023
21:00

Roma (Italy)	0–1	(Spain) Barcelona
	Report	Paralluelo 34'

Stadio Olimpico, Rome
Attendance: 39,454
Referee: Iuliana Demetrescu (Romania)
29 March 2023
18:45

Barcelona (Spain)	5–1	(Italy) Roma
Rolfö 11', 45+2'; León 33'; Oshoala 46'; Guijarro 53'	Report	Serturini 58'

Camp Nou, Barcelona
Attendance: 54,667
Referee: Riem Hussein (Germany)

Barcelona won 6–1 on aggregate.

22 March 2023
21:00

Paris Saint-Germain (France)	0–1	(Germany) VfL Wolfsburg
	Report	Janssen 62' (pen.)

Parc des Princes, Paris
Attendance: 17,465
Referee: Rebecca Welch (England)
30 March 2023
18:45

VfL Wolfsburg (Germany)	1–1	(France) Paris Saint-Germain
Popp 20'	Report	Diani 30'

Volkswagen Arena, Wolfsburg
Attendance: 14,367
Referee: Cheryl Foster (Wales)

VfL Wolfsburg won 2–1 on aggregate.

== Semi-finals ==
The draw for the semi-finals was held on 10 February 2023 (after the quarter-final draw).

=== Summary ===
The first legs were played on 22 and 23 April, and the second legs were played on 27 April and 1 May 2023.

Team 1	Agg.	Team 2	1st leg	2nd leg
VfL Wolfsburg (Germany)	5–4	(England) Arsenal	2–2	3–2 (a.e.t.)
Chelsea (England)	1–2	(Spain) Barcelona	0–1	1–1

=== Matches ===
23 April 2023
15:30

VfL Wolfsburg (Germany)	2–2	(England) Arsenal
Pajor 19'; Jónsdóttir 24'	Report	Rafaelle 45'; Blackstenius 69'

Volkswagen Arena, Wolfsburg
Attendance: 22,617
Referee: Kateryna Monzul (Ukraine)
1 May 2023
18:45

Arsenal (England)	2–3 (a.e.t.)	(Germany) VfL Wolfsburg
Blackstenius 11'; Beattie 75'	Report	Roord 41'; Popp 58'; Bremer 119'

Emirates Stadium, London
Attendance: 60,063
Referee: Lina Lehtovaara (Finland)

VfL Wolfsburg won 5–4 on aggregate.

22 April 2023
13:30

Chelsea (England)	0–1	(Spain) Barcelona
	Report	Graham Hansen 4'

Stamford Bridge, London
Attendance: 27,697
Referee: Jana Adámková (Czech Republic)
27 April 2023
18:45

Barcelona (Spain)	1–1	(England) Chelsea
Graham Hansen 63'	Report	Reiten 67'

Camp Nou, Barcelona
Attendance: 72,262
Referee: Esther Staubli (Switzerland)

Barcelona won 2–1 on aggregate.

== Final ==
The final was played on 3 June 2023 at the Philips Stadion, Eindhoven. A draw was held on 10 February 2023 (after the quarter-final and semi-final draws), to determine which semi-final winner would be designated as the "home" team for administrative purposes.

3 June 2023
16:00

Barcelona (Spain)	3–2	(Germany) VfL Wolfsburg
Guijarro 48', 50'; Rolfö 70'	Report	Pajor 3'; Popp 37'

Philips Stadion, Eindhoven
Attendance: 33,147
Referee: Cheryl Foster (Wales)
