= 2022–23 UEFA Women's Champions League group stage =

International Women's football competition

The 2022–23 UEFA Women's Champions League group stage began on 19 October and ended on 22 December 2022. A total of 16 teams competed in the group stage to decide the eight places in the knockout phase of the 2022–23 UEFA Women's Champions League.

== Draw ==
The draw was held on 3 October and saw the 16 teams split into four pools of four teams.

- Pot 1 contained the four direct entrants, i.e., the Champions League holders and the champions of the top three associations based on their 2021 UEFA women's country coefficients.
- Pot 2, 3 and 4 contained the remaining teams, seeded based on their 2022 UEFA women's club coefficients.

Teams from the same association could not be drawn into the same group. Prior to the draw, UEFA formed one pairing of teams for associations with two or three teams based on television audiences, where one team was drawn into Groups A–B and another team into Groups C–D, so that the two teams played on different days. Clubs from countries with severe winter conditions (Sweden) were assigned a position in their group which allowed them to play away on matchday 6.

- (Spain) Barcelona and Real Madrid
- (France) Paris Saint-Germain and Lyon
- (Germany) Bayern Munich and VfL Wolfsburg
- (England) Chelsea and Arsenal
- (Italy) Juventus and Roma

== Teams ==
Below are the participating teams (with their 2022 UEFA club coefficients), grouped by their seeding pot. They include:

- 4 teams which entered in this stage
- 12 winners of the Round 2 (7 from Champions Path, 5 from League Path)

Key to colours
Group winners and runners-up advanced to Quarter-finals

Pot 1 (by association rank)
Assoc.	Team	Coeff.
TH & 1	(France) Lyon	128.666
2	(Germany) VfL Wolfsburg	102.133
3	(England) Chelsea	78.200
4	(Spain) Barcelona	112.233

Pot 2
Team	Notes	Coeff.
(France) Paris Saint-Germain		85.666
(Germany) Bayern Munich		84.133
(Czech Republic) Slavia Prague		47.766
(England) Arsenal		39.200

Pot 3
Team	Notes	Coeff.
(Sweden) Rosengård		38.833
(Italy) Juventus		30.900
(Spain) Real Madrid		26.233
(Austria) St. Pölten		25.700

Pot 4
Team	Notes	Coeff.
(Switzerland) Zürich		22.500
(Albania) Vllaznia		14.400
(Portugal) Benfica		13.600
(Italy) Roma		5.900

Notes

1. ^{TH} Champions League title holders, automatically placed into Pot 1 as top seed. Because the title holders were also the champions of the first-ranked association, the champions of the fourth-ranked association also entered the group stage.
2. ^{CH} Winners of round 2 (Champions Path).
3. ^{LP} Winners of round 2 (League Path).

== Format ==
In each group, teams played against each other home-and-away in a round-robin format. The top two teams of each group advanced to the quarter-finals.

=== Tiebreakers ===
Teams were ranked according to points (3 points for a win, 1 point for a draw, 0 points for a loss). If two or more teams were tied on points, the following tiebreaking criteria were applied, in the order given, to determine the rankings (see Article 18 Equality of points – group stage, Regulations of the UEFA Women's Champions League):

1. Points in head-to-head matches among the tied teams;
2. Goal difference in head-to-head matches among the tied teams;
3. Goals scored in head-to-head matches among the tied teams;
4. If more than two teams were tied, and after applying all head-to-head criteria above, a subset of teams were still tied, all head-to-head criteria above were reapplied exclusively to this subset of teams;
5. Goal difference in all group matches;
6. Goals scored in all group matches;
7. Away goals scored in all group matches;
8. Wins in all group matches;
9. Away wins in all group matches;
10. Disciplinary points (direct red card = 3 points; double yellow card = 3 points; single yellow card = 1 point);
11. UEFA club coefficient.

== Groups ==
Times are CET/CEST, (Note: CEST (UTC+2) for dates up to 29 October 2022 (matchdays 1–2), and CET (UTC+1) for dates thereafter (matchdays 3–6).) as listed by UEFA (local times, if different, are in parentheses).

=== Group A ===
Pos	Team	Pld	W	D	L	GF	GA	GD	Pts	Qualification	CHE	PAR	MAD	VLL
1	(England) Chelsea	6	5	1	0	19	1	+18	16	Advance to Quarter-finals	—	3–0	2–0	8–0
2	(France) Paris Saint-Germain	6	3	1	2	11	5	+6	10	Advance to Quarter-finals	0–1	—	2–1	5–0
3	(Spain) Real Madrid	6	2	2	2	9	6	+3	8		1–1	0–0	—	5–1
4	(Albania) Vllaznia	6	0	0	6	1	28	−27	0		0–4	0–4	0–2	—

Source: UEFA
Rules for classification: Group stage tiebreakers
20 October 2022
18:45

Vllaznia (Albania)	0–2	(Spain) Real Madrid
	Report	González 54'; Carmona 76' (pen.)

Loro Boriçi Stadium, Shkodër
Attendance: 5,400
Referee: Catarina Campos (Portugal)
20 October 2022
21:00

Paris Saint-Germain (France)	0–1	(England) Chelsea
	Report	Bright 27'

Stade Jean-Bouin, Paris
Attendance: 5,222
Referee: Ewa Augustyn (Poland)

26 October 2022
18:45

Real Madrid (Spain)	0–0	(France) Paris Saint-Germain
	Report

Alfredo Di Stéfano, Madrid
Attendance: 1,544
Referee: Jana Adámková (Czech Republic)
26 October 2022
21:00

Chelsea (England)	8–0	(Albania) Vllaznia
Kerr 10', 37', 57', 60'; Harder 38', 72', 88'; Svitková 78'	Report

Kingsmeadow, Norbiton
Attendance: 3,022
Referee: Sabina Bolic (Croatia)

23 November 2022
18:45

Paris Saint-Germain (France)	5–0	(Albania) Vllaznia
Geyoro 39'; Gjergji 44' (o.g.); Bachmann 60' (pen.); Baltimore 76'; Folquet 85'	Report

Stade Jean-Bouin, Paris
Attendance: 1,643
Referee: Maria Marotta (Italy)
23 November 2022
21:00

Chelsea (England)	2–0	(Spain) Real Madrid
Ingle 67'; Cuthbert 76'	Report

Kingsmeadow, Norbiton
Attendance: 3,336
Referee: Maria Sole Caputi (Italy)

8 December 2022
18:45

Vllaznia (Albania)	0–4	(France) Paris Saint-Germain
	Report	Diani 19' (pen.), 36'; Bachmann 60'; Folquet 81'

Loro Boriçi Stadium, Shkodër
Attendance: 900
Referee: Frida Nielsen (Denmark)
8 December 2022
21:00

Real Madrid (Spain)	1–1	(England) Chelsea
Weir 36'	Report	M. Rodríguez 59' (o.g.)

Alfredo Di Stéfano, Madrid
Attendance: 1,883
Referee: Kateryna Monzul (Ukraine)

16 December 2022
18:45

Vllaznia (Albania)	0–4	(England) Chelsea
	Report	Ingle 12'; Kirby 20'; Svitková 87'; Mjelde 90+3' (pen.)

Loro Boriçi Stadium, Shkodër
Attendance: 220
Referee: Karoline Wacker (Germany)
16 December 2022
21:00

Paris Saint-Germain (France)	2–1	(Spain) Real Madrid
De Almeida 15'; Diani 60' (pen.)	Report	Zornoza 81'

Parc des Princes, Paris
Attendance: 16,319
Referee: Lina Lehtovaara (Finland)

22 December 2022
21:00

Real Madrid (Spain)	5–1	(Albania) Vllaznia
Weir 11'; Abelleira 19', 21' (pen.); Camacho 78'; Partido 82'	Report	Doci 5'

Alfredo Di Stéfano, Madrid
Attendance: 611
Referee: Zuzana Valentová (Slovakia)
22 December 2022
21:00

Chelsea (England)	3–0	(France) Paris Saint-Germain
Kerr 42'; James 55', 62'	Report

Stamford Bridge, Fulham
Attendance: 10,129
Referee: Iuliana Demetrescu (Romania)

=== Group B ===
Pos	Team	Pld	W	D	L	GF	GA	GD	Pts	Qualification	WOL	ROM	PÖL	PRA
1	(Germany) VfL Wolfsburg	6	4	2	0	19	5	+14	14	Advance to Quarter-finals	—	4–2	4–0	0–0
2	(Italy) Roma	6	4	1	1	16	8	+8	13	Advance to Quarter-finals	1–1	—	5–0	1–0
3	(Austria) St. Pölten	6	1	1	4	7	22	−15	4		2–8	3–4	—	1–1
4	(Czech Republic) Slavia Prague	6	0	2	4	1	8	−7	2		0–2	0–3	0–1	—

Source: UEFA
Rules for classification: Group stage tiebreakers
20 October 2022
18:45

VfL Wolfsburg (Germany)	4–0	(Austria) St. Pölten
Pajor 8', 15'; Lattwein 56'; Roord 90'	Report

AOK Stadion, Wolfsburg
Attendance: 1,706
Referee: Abigail Byrne (England)
20 October 2022
21:00

Roma (Italy)	1–0	(Czech Republic) Slavia Prague
Giacinti 62'	Report

Stadio Domenico Francioni, Latina
Attendance: 2,363
Referee: Volha Tsiareshka (Belarus)

26 October 2022
18:45

St. Pölten (Austria)	3–4	(Italy) Roma
Eder 30' (pen.); Schumacher 46'; Mikolajová 89'	Report	Linari 75'; Giacinti 77'; Giugliano 80'; Lázaro 87'

NV Arena, Sankt Pölten
Attendance: 2,816
Referee: Tess Olofsson (Sweden)
26 October 2022
21:00

Slavia Prague (Czech Republic)	0–2	(Germany) VfL Wolfsburg
	Report	Brand 11'; Pajor 76'

Fortuna Arena, Prague
Attendance: 2,312
Referee: Katalin Sipos (Hungary)

23 November 2022
18:45

Slavia Prague (Czech Republic)	0–1	(Austria) St. Pölten
	Report	Mikolajová 90+1'

Lokotrans Aréna, Mladá Boleslav
Attendance: 645
Referee: Tess Olofsson (Sweden)
23 November 2022
21:00

Roma (Italy)	1–1	(Germany) VfL Wolfsburg
Giacinti 3'	Report	Pajor 33'

Stadio Domenico Francioni, Latina
Attendance: 3,350
Referee: Jelena Ćetković (Serbia)

8 December 2022
18:45

VfL Wolfsburg (Germany)	4–2	(Italy) Roma
Pajor 24', 53'; Jónsdóttir 40'; Lattwein 52'	Report	Andressa 42'; Haug 76'

AOK Stadion, Wolfsburg
Attendance: 2,721
Referee: Rebecca Welch (England)
8 December 2022
21:00

St. Pölten (Austria)	1–1	(Czech Republic) Slavia Prague
Zver 40'	Report	Růžičková 27'

NV Arena, Sankt Pölten
Attendance: 1,447
Referee: Shona Shukrula (Netherlands)

16 December 2022
18:45 (Note: The game was stopped in the first half due to heavy rain and resumed at 20:15.)

Roma (Italy)	5–0	(Austria) St. Pölten
Serturini 34'; Glionna 82', 88'; Giugliano 84', 86'	Report

Stadio Domenico Francioni, Latina
Attendance: 1,540
Referee: Cheryl Foster (Wales)
16 December 2022
21:00

VfL Wolfsburg (Germany)	0–0	(Czech Republic) Slavia Prague
	Report

AOK Stadion, Wolfsburg
Attendance: 2,315
Referee: Henrikke Nervik (Norway)

22 December 2022
18:45

Slavia Prague (Czech Republic)	0–3	(Italy) Roma
	Report	Giacinti 31'; Kollmats 37'; Linari 49'

Fortuna Arena, Prague
Attendance: 1,064
Referee: Lizzy van der Helm (Netherlands)
22 December 2022
18:45

St. Pölten (Austria)	2–8	(Germany) VfL Wolfsburg
Zver 78'; Schumacher 85'	Report	Lattwein 5'; Hegering 38'; Huth 40'; Pajor 56'; Waßmuth 67'; Wolter 74', 76'; Bremer 85'

NV Arena, Sankt Pölten
Attendance: 1,312
Referee: Eleni Antoniou (Greece)

=== Group C ===
Pos	Team	Pld	W	D	L	GF	GA	GD	Pts	Qualification	ARS	LYO	JUV	ZÜR
1	(England) Arsenal	6	4	1	1	19	5	+14	13	Advance to Quarter-finals	—	0–1	1–0	3–1
2	(France) Lyon	6	3	2	1	10	6	+4	11	Advance to Quarter-finals	1–5	—	0–0	4–0
3	(Italy) Juventus	6	2	3	1	9	3	+6	9		1–1	1–1	—	5–0
4	(Switzerland) Zürich	6	0	0	6	2	26	−24	0		1–9	0–3	0–2	—

Source: UEFA
Rules for classification: Group stage tiebreakers
19 October 2022
18:45

Zürich (Switzerland)	0–2	(Italy) Juventus
	Report	Cernoia 71'; Bonansea 85'

Wefox Arena, Schaffhausen
Attendance: 1,840
Referee: Ainara Acevedo (Spain)
19 October 2022
21:00

Lyon (France)	1–5	(England) Arsenal
Malard 27'	Report	Foord 13', 67'; Maanum 23'; Mead 45+1', 69'

Parc Olympique Lyonnais, Décines-Charpieu
Attendance: 8,012
Referee: Ivana Projkovska (North Macedonia)

27 October 2022
18:45

Juventus (Italy)	1–1	(France) Lyon
Malard 52' (o.g.)	Report	Horan 23'

Juventus Stadium, Turin
Attendance: 7,331
Referee: Marta Huerta de Aza (Spain)
27 October 2022
21:00

Arsenal (England)	3–1	(Switzerland) Zürich
Nobbs 38'; Hurtig 45+1', 79'	Report	Piubel 76'

Emirates Stadium, London
Attendance: 5,397
Referee: Lina Lehtovaara (Finland)

24 November 2022
18:45

Zürich (Switzerland)	0–3	(France) Lyon
	Report	Malard 4'; Bruun 35', 66'

Wefox Arena, Schaffhausen
Attendance: 2,073
Referee: Angelika Söder (Germany)
24 November 2022
21:00

Juventus (Italy)	1–1	(England) Arsenal
Beerensteyn 52'	Report	Miedema 61'

Juventus Stadium, Turin
Attendance: 8,508
Referee: Iuliana Demetrescu (Romania)

7 December 2022
18:45

Lyon (France)	4–0	(Switzerland) Zürich
Horan 14'; Malard 65', 79'; Cascarino 90+4'	Report

Parc Olympique Lyonnais, Décines-Charpieu
Attendance: 7,106
Referee: Monika Mularczyk (Poland)
7 December 2022
21:00

Arsenal (England)	1–0	(Italy) Juventus
Miedema 17'	Report

Emirates Stadium, London
Attendance: 6,592
Referee: Ivana Martinčić (Croatia)

15 December 2022
19:30 (Note: The kickoff, originally scheduled for 18:45, was delayed due to snowy conditions.)

Juventus (Italy)	5–0	(Switzerland) Zürich
Girelli 2', 45' (pen.), 57', 59' (pen.); Beerensteyn 25'	Report

Juventus Stadium, Turin
Attendance: 3,097
Referee: Riem Hussein (Germany)
15 December 2022
21:00

Arsenal (England)	0–1	(France) Lyon
	Report	Maanum 45+2' (o.g.)

Emirates Stadium, London
Attendance: 7,711
Referee: Marta Huerta de Aza (Spain)

21 December 2022
18:45

Zürich (Switzerland)	1–9	(England) Arsenal
Humm 64' (pen.)	Report	Maanum 18', 32', 51'; Foord 23', 68'; Blackstenius 45+1', 54'; Little 71' (pen.); Iwabuchi 83'

Wefox Arena, Schaffhausen
Attendance: 4,264
Referee: Alina Peşu (Romania)
21 December 2022
18:45

Lyon (France)	0–0	(Italy) Juventus
	Report

Parc Olympique Lyonnais, Décines-Charpieu
Attendance: 11,212
Referee: Jana Adámková (Czech Republic)

=== Group D ===
Pos	Team	Pld	W	D	L	GF	GA	GD	Pts	Qualification	BAR	MUN	BEN	ROS
1	(Spain) Barcelona	6	5	0	1	29	6	+23	15 (Note: Tied on head-to-head points. Head-to-head goal difference: Barcelona +1, Bayern Munich −1.)	Advance to Quarter-finals	—	3–0	9–0	6–0
2	(Germany) Bayern Munich	6	5	0	1	14	7	+7	15	Advance to Quarter-finals	3–1	—	2–0	2–1
3	(Portugal) Benfica	6	2	0	4	8	21	−13	6		2–6	2–3	—	1–0
4	(Sweden) Rosengård	6	0	0	6	3	20	−17	0		1–4	0–4	1–3	—

Source: UEFA
Rules for classification: Group stage tiebreakers
Notes:
19 October 2022
18:45

Bayern Munich (Germany)	2–1	(Sweden) Rosengård
Simon 35'; Dallmann 57'	Report	Kullashi 25'

FC Bayern Campus, Munich
Attendance: 1,284
Referee: Jelena Cvetković (Serbia)
19 October 2022
21:00

Barcelona (Spain)	9–0	(Portugal) Benfica
Guijarro 1'; Bonmatí 14'; Oshoala 34', 84'; Caldentey 50'; Crnogorčević 65'; Geyse 67', 88'; Pina 77'	Report

Johan Cruyff Stadium, Sant Joan Despí
Attendance: 5,004
Referee: Ionela Peșu (Romania)

27 October 2022
18:45

Rosengård (Sweden)	1–4	(Spain) Barcelona
Holdt 45+2'	Report	Bonmatí 30', 41'; Caldentey 65', 90+2'

Malmö IP, Malmö
Attendance: 4,812
Referee: Lorraine Watson (Scotland)
27 October 2022
21:00

Benfica (Portugal)	2–3	(Germany) Bayern Munich
Nycole Raysla 42'; Lacasse 59'	Report	Rall 67'; Stanway 83', 90+8'

Benfica Campus, Seixal
Attendance: 743
Referee: Eleni Antoniou (Greece)

24 November 2022
18:45

Barcelona (Spain)	3–0	(Germany) Bayern Munich
Geyse 47'; Bonmatí 59'; Pina 66'	Report

Camp Nou, Barcelona
Attendance: 46,967
Referee: Cheryl Foster (Wales)
24 November 2022
21:00

Benfica (Portugal)	1–0	(Sweden) Rosengård
Lacasse 22'	Report

Benfica Campus, Seixal
Attendance: 409
Referee: Volha Tsiareshka (Belarus)

7 December 2022
18:45

Rosengård (Sweden)	1–3	(Portugal) Benfica
Schough 30'	Report	Lacasse 37', 40'; Raysla 47'

Malmö IP, Malmö
Attendance: 1,022
Referee: Ivana Projkovska (North Macedonia)
7 December 2022
21:00

Bayern Munich (Germany)	3–1	(Spain) Barcelona
Bühl 4'; Magull 10'; Schüller 60'	Report	Geyse 65'

Allianz Arena, Munich
Attendance: 24,000
Referee: Esther Staubli (Switzerland)

15 December 2022
18:45

Rosengård (Sweden)	0–4	(Germany) Bayern Munich
	Report	Tainara 38'; Lohmann 66'; Stanway 73'; Landenberger 90'

Malmö IP, Malmö
Attendance: 1,653
Referee: Ewa Augustyn (Poland)
15 December 2022
21:00

Benfica (Portugal)	2–6	(Spain) Barcelona
J. Silva 62'; Lacasse 81'	Report	Paredes 8'; Pina 45+2'; Bonmatí 48'; Crnogorčević 58'; Seiça 80' (o.g.); Caldentey 90+1'

Benfica Campus, Seixal
Attendance: 850
Referee: Jelena Cvetković (Serbia)

21 December 2022
21:00

Barcelona (Spain)	6–0	(Sweden) Rosengård
Oshoala 10', 16'; María León 45+3'; Rolfö 47'; Torrejón 50'; Paredes 69'	Report

Camp Nou, Barcelona
Attendance: 28,720
Referee: Désirée Grundbacher (Switzerland)
21 December 2022
21:00

Bayern Munich (Germany)	2–0	(Portugal) Benfica
Bühl 51', 75'	Report

FC Bayern Campus, Munich
Attendance: 1,840
Referee: Maria Sole Caputi (Italy)
