= Cheryl Foster =

Welsh footballer and referee

Cheryl Foster MBE
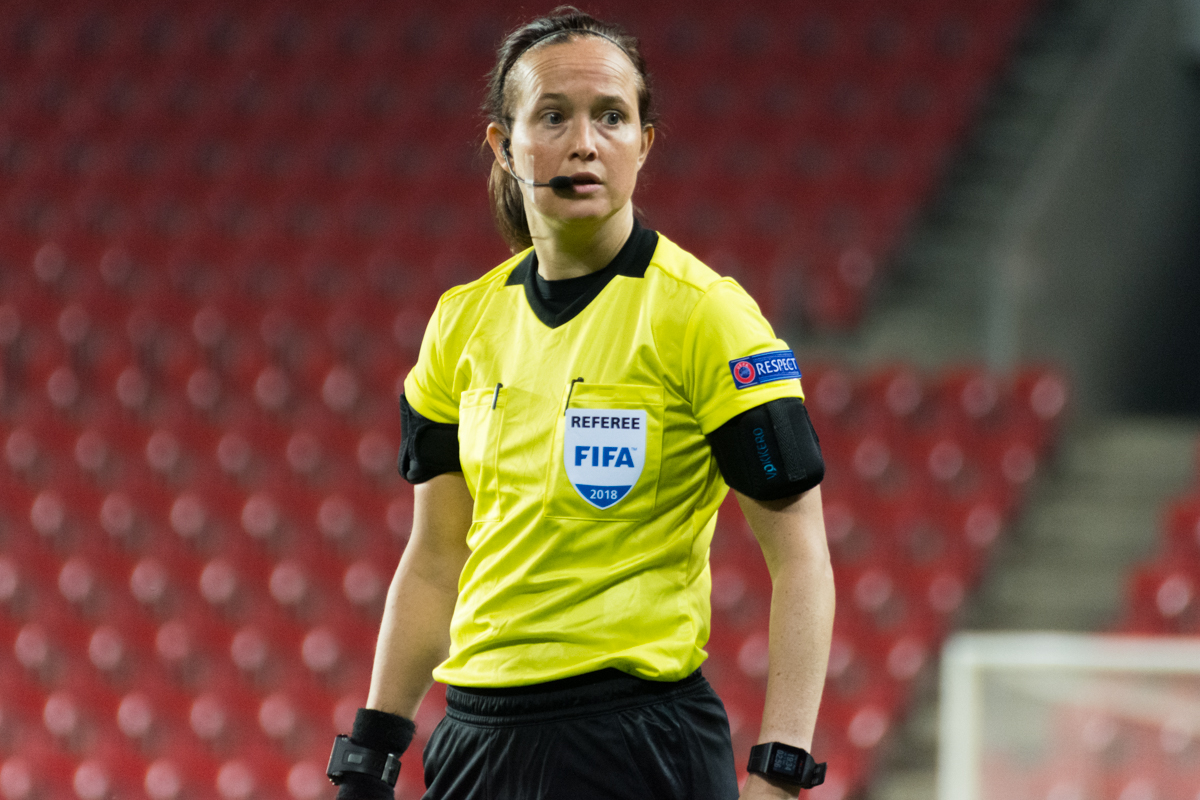

Personal information
- Full name: Cheryl Foster
- Date of birth: 4 October 1980 (age 46)
- Place of birth: Bangor, Wales
- Height: 1.68 m (5 ft 6 in)
- Position: Forward

Youth career
- Conwy Devils

Senior career*
| Years | Team | Apps | (Gls) |
| –2003 | Bangor City | | |
| 2003–2012 | Liverpool | | |
| 2010 | → St Francis (loan) | | |
| 2013 | Doncaster Rovers Belles | 3 | (1) |

International career^{‡}
| 1997–2011 | Wales | 63 | (9) |
- * Club domestic league appearances and goals as of 4 May 2010 (UTC) ‡ National team caps and goals as of 4 May 2010 (UTC)

Cheryl Foster MBE (born 4 October 1980) is a Welsh football referee and former player. She became the all-time record appearance holder for the Wales women's national football team in 2009, after making her senior international debut in 1997. At club level Foster spent nine years with Liverpool, playing in the first two seasons of the FA WSL in 2011 and 2012. She signed for Liverpool's FA WSL rivals Doncaster Rovers Belles in January 2013, before retiring later that season.

== Playing career ==
=== Club career ===
After starting her career at Conwy Devils, Foster moved to Bangor City and was the club's Northern Division top-scorer in every season from 1999–00 to 2002–03. She also represented the club in the UEFA Women's Cup.

In summer 2003 Foster joined an exodus of players leaving Bangor City for Liverpool. By season 2009–10, she was Liverpool Ladies' longest serving player. That season she was the Northern Division top goalscorer with 16 goals as Liverpool romped to the title. Foster and Liverpool teammate Kelly Jones joined FAI Women's Cup winners St Francis on loan for a 2010–11 UEFA Women's Champions League qualifying tournament in August 2010.

Foster had planned to retire at the age of 30 years, but changed her mind in order to play in the FA WSL. She then scored Liverpool's first goal in the new competition, helping them to a 3–3 opening day draw against local rivals Everton.

In October 2012 Foster was amongst ten players to be released by Liverpool. She signed for Doncaster Rovers Belles in January 2013. During the 2013 mid-season break Foster left Doncaster after struggling to balance the demands of travel and training with her career outside football. She announced her intention to start coaching and that she would consider whether to continue playing.

=== International career ===
Foster represented Wales at youth level, winning five U16 caps, four U18 caps and scoring one goal in a single U20 appearance.

Her full debut was in 1997 and she captained the side on her 50th appearance, a 3–0 friendly win over Slovenia in Llanelli in August 2009. Foster won a record 52nd cap in Wales's 2–1 defeat in Azerbaijan in October 2009.

In May 2014, the Football Association of Wales (FAW) recognised Foster's 63 appearances with the award of a golden cap at half-time of Wales' 4–0 win over Montenegro in Bangor.

== International goals ==
| No. | Date | Venue | Opponent | Score | Result | Competition |
|---|---|---|---|---|---|---|
| 1. | 25 May 2002 | Ottensheim, Austria | Austria | 1–? | 1–1 | 2003 FIFA Women's World Cup qualification |
| 2. | 14 March 2003 | Lagoa, Portugal | Portugal | 1–1 | 1–1 | 2003 Algarve Cup |
| 3. | 16 March 2004 | Albufeira, Portugal | Portugal | ?–? | 3–2 | 2004 Algarve Cup |
| 4. | 16 March 2004 | Albufeira, Portugal | Portugal | ?–? | 3–2 | 2004 Algarve Cup |
| 5. | 26 March 2006 | Newtown, Wales | Moldova | 1–0 | 3–0 | 2007 FIFA Women's World Cup qualification |
| 6. | 20 August 2006 | Waalwijk, Netherlands | Israel | 1–0 | 3–1 | 2007 FIFA Women's World Cup qualification |
| 7. | 18 November 2006 | Strumica, North Macedonia | Faroe Islands | 1–0 | 2–1 | UEFA Women's Euro 2009 qualifying |
| 8. | 21 November 2006 | Strumica, North Macedonia | North Macedonia | 4–0 | 6–0 | UEFA Women's Euro 2009 qualifying |
| 9. | 21 November 2006 | Strumica, North Macedonia | North Macedonia | 6–0 | 6–0 | UEFA Women's Euro 2009 qualifying |

== Refereeing ==
After deciding not to extend her career as a player in 2013, Foster instead started training as a referee. She was an assistant referee at the 2013–14 Welsh Women's Cup final. In December 2015, during her third season as a referee, Foster was named on the FIFA international list.

On 18 August 2018, she became the first female referee to take charge of a Welsh Premier League game. In May 2023, she was named as the referee for the 2023 UEFA Women's Champions League final between Barcelona and Wolfsburg on 3 June 2023. On 9 January 2023, FIFA appointed her to the officiating pool for the 2023 FIFA Women's World Cup in Australia and New Zealand.

== Personal life ==
From Llandudno, North Wales. Her parents Stephen and Christina Foster continue to be her biggest supporters alongside her two sisters. Foster is a Liverpool FC supporter and works as a P.E. teacher at Bishops' Blue Coat Church of England High School, Chester.

She was appointed a Member of the Order of the British Empire (MBE) in the 2024 Birthday Honours "for services to association football and to women's sport".

She was awarded an Honorary Doctorate from Bangor University in 2025 for contribution to sporting achievements.

== Honours ==
=== Club ===
Liverpool

- FA Women's Premier League Northern Division: 2003–04, 2006–07, 2009–10
