= 2019–20 Paris Saint-Germain FC (women) season =

Paris Saint-Germain Féminine
2019–20 season
- President: Nasser Al-Khelaifi
- Head coach: Olivier Echouafni
- Stadium: Stade Jean-Bouin; Stade Municipal Georges Lefèvre
- Division 1 Féminine: 2nd
- Coupe de France: Runners-up
- Trophée des Championnes: Runners-up
- UEFA Women's Champions League: Semi-finals
- Top goalscorer: League: Marie-Antoinette Katoto (16); All: Marie-Antoinette Katoto (24)
Home colours	Away colours	Third colours

The 2019–20 season was Paris Saint-Germain Féminine's 49th season since its creation in 1971, and its 33rd season in the top-flight of women's football in France.

== Players ==
As of 11 March 2020

Note: Flags indicate national team as defined under FIFA eligibility rules; some limited exceptions apply. Players may hold more than one non-FIFA nationality.

No.	Pos.	Nation	Player
1	GK	POL	Katarzyna Kiedrzynek
2	DF	SWE	Hanna Glas
4	DF	POL	Paulina Dudek
5	DF	USA	Alana Cook
6	MF	BRA	Luana
8	MF	FRA	Grace Geyoro
9	FW	FRA	Marie-Antoinette Katoto
10	FW	DEN	Nadia Nadim
11	FW	FRA	Kadidiatou Diani
12	DF	CAN	Ashley Lawrence
13	MF	GER	Sara Däbritz
14	DF	ESP	Irene Paredes (captain)

No.	Pos.	Nation	Player
15	MF	NOR	Karina Sævik
16	GK	CHI	Christiane Endler
17	DF	FRA	Eve Perisset
18	MF	FRA	Lina Boussaha
20	DF	FRA	Perle Morroni
21	MF	FRA	Sandy Baltimore
22	FW	DEN	Signe Bruun
23	FW	CAN	Jordyn Huitema
24	MF	BRA	Formiga
27	MF	FRA	Léa Khelifi
30	GK	USA	Arianna Criscione

=== Out on loan ===
Note: Flags indicate national team as defined under FIFA eligibility rules; some limited exceptions apply. Players may hold more than one non-FIFA nationality.

No.	Pos.	Nation	Player
—	MF	FRA	Aminata Diallo (at Utah Royals until 30 December 2020)

== Transfers ==
Note: indicates a mid-season transfer.

=== In ===
Date	Position	Player	From	Source
17 May 2019	FW	(Canada) Jordyn Huitema	(Canada) Vancouver Whitecaps	
20 May 2019	MF	(Germany) Sara Däbritz	(Germany) Bayern Munich	
7 June 2019	MF	(France) Léa Khelifi	(France) Metz	
18 July 2019	GK	(United States) Arianna Criscione	Free agent	
5 August 2019	MF	(Norway) Karina Sævik	(Norway) Kolbotn	
3 January 2020	MF	(Brazil) Luana	(South Korea) Hwacheon KSPO	

=== Out ===
Position	Player	To	Source
GK	(Germany) Charlotte Voll	(Germany) SC Sand	
DF	(Sweden) Emma Berglund	(Sweden) Kopparbergs/Göteborg	
DF	(Brazil) Daiane Limeira	(Spain) CD Tacón	
MF	(France) Kenza Allaoui	(France) US Orléans	
MF	(Norway) Andrine Hegerberg	(Italy) Roma	
MF	(Morocco) Anissa Lahmari	(France) Soyaux	
MF	(China) Wang Shuang	(China) Wuhan Chedu Jiangda	
MF	(France) Annahita Zamanian	(Italy) Juventus	
MF	(France) Aminata Diallo	(United States) Utah Royals (loan)	
FW	(Turkey) Melike Pekel	(France) Metz	
FW	(Belgium) Davinia Vanmechelen	(Netherlands) Twente	

== Pre-season and friendlies ==
27 July 2019 Friendly	Paris Saint-Germain (France)	7–1	(France) US Orléans	Bougival
11:00 CEST (UTC+2)	Dudek 17', 23'; Nadim 20', 44', 55'; Katoto 26'; Boulleau 60+2'		37'	Stadium: CSLBF de Bougival
Note: Thirty minute halves.

6 August 2019 Friendly	Paris Saint-Germain (France)	2–1	(Germany) Bayern Munich	Colomiers
21:00 CEST (UTC+2)	Formiga (yellow card) 34'; Diallo (yellow card) 36'; Zamanian 59'; Huitema 77'	Report	Islacker 39'	Stadium: Stade Michel Bendichou; Referee: Clémence Goncalves

8 August 2019 Friendly	Paris Saint-Germain (France)	1–1 (a.e.t.) (3–4 p)	(France) Montpellier	Colomiers
21:00 CEST (UTC+2)	Geyoro 41'; Lawrence (yellow card) 77'; Zamanian (yellow card) 89'	Report	Mayi Kith (yellow card) 11'; Gauvin 74' (pen.); Puntigam (yellow card) 83'	Stadium: Stade Michel Bendichou; Referee: Maïka Vanderstichel
	Penalties
	Perisset (penalty scored); Katoto (penalty missed); Nadim (penalty scored); Khelifi (penalty scored); Zamanian (penalty missed); Dudek (penalty missed)		(penalty missed) Le Bihan; (penalty scored) Toletti; (penalty scored) Mondésir; (penalty scored) Puntigam; (penalty missed) Karchaoui; (penalty scored) De Almeida

16 August 2019 Friendly	A.C. Milan (Italy)	0–6	(France) Paris Saint-Germain	Hägendorf, Switzerland
17:30 CEST (UTC+2)		Report	Hovland 15' (o.g.); Katoto 28'; Diani 44', 57'; Baltimore 86'; Zamanian 87'	Stadium: Raiffeisen Arena; Attendance: 650; Referee: Michèle Schmölzer (Switzerland)

18 August 2019 Friendly	Paris Saint-Germain (France)	4–0	(Italy) Juventus	Hägendorf, Switzerland
14:00 CEST (UTC+2)	Khelifi 34'; Huitema 41', 58'; Zamanian (yellow card) 64'; Nadim 74' (pen.)	Report		Stadium: Raiffeisen Arena; Attendance: 700

8 September 2019 Friendly	Roma (Italy)	2–2 (a.e.t.) (3–5 p)	(France) Paris Saint-Germain	Rome, Italy
16:30 CEST (UTC+2)	Serturini 49'; Bonfantini 82'	Report	Huitema 8', 36'	Stadium: Stadio Tre Fontane; Attendance: 1150
	Penalties
	Penalty scored Penalty missed		(penalty scored) Zamanian; (penalty scored) Lawrence; (penalty scored) Baltimore; (penalty scored) Huitema; (penalty scored) Ould Hocine

== Competitions ==
=== Overview ===
Competition	First match	Last match	Starting round	Final position	Record							
Competition	First match	Last match	Starting round	Final position	Pld	W	D	L	GF	GA	GD	Win %
Ligue 1	25 August 2019	22 February 2020	Matchday 1	2nd	16	13	2	1	60	7	+53	81.25
Coupe de France	12 January 2020	9 August 2020	Round of 32	Runners-up	5	4	1	0	20	2	+18	80.00
Trophée des Championnes	21 September 2019		Final	Runners-up	1	0	1	0	1	1	+0	0.00
Champions League	12 September 2019	26 August 2020	Round of 32	Semi-finalists	6	4	1	1	16	3	+13	66.67
Total					28	21	5	2	97	13	+84	75.00

Last updated: 26 August 2020.
Source: Competitions

=== Trophée des Championnes ===
21 September 2019 Final	Lyon	1–1 (a.e.t.) (4–3 p)	Paris Saint-Germain	Guingamp
15:30 CEST (UTC+2)	Majri 31'	Report	Nadim (yellow card) 27', (goal) 43'; Morroni (yellow card) 90+4'	Stadium: Stade de Roudourou; Attendance: 12,558; Referee: Marie-Soleil Beaudoin (Canada)
	Penalties
	Majri (penalty scored); Mbock (penalty scored); Le Sommer (penalty missed); Hegerberg (penalty scored); Renard (penalty scored)		(penalty missed) Katoto; (penalty scored) Däbritz; (penalty scored) Diani; (penalty scored) Dudek; (penalty missed) Geyoro

=== Division 1 Féminine ===
==== League table ====
Pos	Team	Pld	W	D	L	GF	GA	GD	Pts	Qualification or relegation
1	Lyon	16	14	2	0	67	4	+63	44	Qualification for 2020–21 UEFA Women's Champions League
2	Paris Saint-Germain	16	13	2	1	60	7	+53	41	Qualification for 2020–21 UEFA Women's Champions League
3	Bordeaux	16	12	1	3	36	12	+24	37	
4	Montpellier	16	9	3	4	39	18	+21	30	
5	Paris FC	16	7	3	6	21	26	−5	24	
6	Guingamp	16	6	5	5	20	21	−1	23	
7	Fleury	16	6	2	8	18	30	−12	20	
8	Reims	16	4	3	9	13	32	−19	15	
9	Dijon	16	3	5	8	10	32	−22	14	
10	Soyaux	16	4	4	8	15	30	−15	13 (Note: 3 points deduction (sanctioned by DNCG).)	
11	Marseille	16	2	0	14	12	62	−50	6	Relegation to 2020–21 Division 2 Féminine
12	Metz	16	0	2	14	7	44	−37	2	Relegation to 2020–21 Division 2 Féminine

Updated to match(es) played on 23 February 2020. Source:
Rules for classification: 1) points; 2) head-to-head points; 3) head-to-head goal difference; 4) goal difference; 5) goals scored

==== Results by round ====
Round	1	2	3	4	5	6	7	8	9	10	11	12	13	14	15	16
Ground	H	A	H	H	A	H	A	H	A	A	H	A	H	H	A	A
Result	W	W	W	W	W	W	W	D	L	W	D	W	W	W	W	W
Position	1	1	2	2	2	1	1	2	2	2	2	2	2	2	2	2

Updated to match(es) played on 22 February 2020. Source: Matches
A = Away; H = Home; W = Win; D = Draw; L = Loss; P = Postponed

==== Matches ====
25 August 2019 1	Paris Saint-Germain	7–0	Soyaux	Paris
14:45 CEST (UTC+2)	Katoto 1', 33'; Glas 35'; Formiga (yellow card) 45'; Diani 51'; Geyoro 61'; Nadim 66'; Däbritz 72'; Paredes (yellow card) 78'	Report	Couturier (yellow card) 36'	Stadium: Stade Jean-Bouin; Attendance: 1610; Referee: Camille Soriano

7 September 2019 2	Metz	1–6	Paris Saint-Germain	Metz
16:30 CEST (UTC+2)	Bigot (yellow card) 24'; Gordon 59'	Report	Diani 53', 66', 74', 90+2'; Katoto 60'; Däbritz 90+4'	Stadium: Stade Saint-Symphorien; Attendance: 1913; Referee: Savina Elbour

15 September 2019 3	Paris Saint-Germain	4–0	Dijon	Paris
16:30 CEST (UTC+2)	Nadim 36'; Baltimore 48'; Huitema 81'; Diani 85' (pen.)	Report	Cuynet (yellow card) 63'	Stadium: Stade Jean-Bouin; Attendance: 770; Referee: Élodie Coppola

29 September 2019 4	Paris Saint-Germain	3–0	Bordeaux	Paris
14:45 CEST (UTC+2)	Morroni (yellow card) 23'; Katoto 42'; Geyoro 43'; Glas (yellow card) 66'; Nadim 70' (pen.)	Report	Jaurena (yellow card) 14'; Sousa (yellow card) 69'	Stadium: Stade Municipal Georges Lefèvre; Attendance: 600; Referee: Victoria Beyer

12 October 2019 5	Fleury	0–2	Paris Saint-Germain	Fleury-Mérogis
14:30 CEST (UTC+2)	Haupais (yellow card) 1'	Report	Däbritz 4'; Diani 43'	Stadium: Stade Auguste Gentelet; Attendance: 589; Referee: Solenne Bartnik

19 October 2019 6	Paris Saint-Germain	2–0	Paris FC	Paris
20:45 CEST (UTC+2)	Katoto 33', 55'	Report	Vaysse (yellow card) 43'; Thiney (yellow card) 67'	Stadium: Stade Jean-Bouin; Attendance: 1624; Referee: Savina Elbour

27 October 2019 7	Marseille	0–5	Paris Saint-Germain	Marseille
14:45 CEST (UTC+2)	Laplacette (yellow card) 65'; Blanc (yellow card) 90+1'	Report	Katoto 13', 36'; Perisset 27'; Diallo (yellow card) 54'; Geyoro 55'; Paredes (yellow card) 62'; Nadim 69' (pen.)	Stadium: Stade Paul Le Cesne; Attendance: 800; Referee: Maïka Vanderstichel

3 November 2019 8	Paris Saint-Germain	1–1	Guingamp	Paris
14:45 CEST (UTC+2)	Däbritz 51'	Report	Tyryshkina (yellow card) 41'; Dudek 72' (o.g.)	Stadium: Stade Jean-Bouin; Attendance: 885; Referee: (France) Solenne Bartnik

16 November 2019 9	Lyon	1–0	Paris Saint-Germain	Décines-Charpieu
17:30 CEST (UTC+2)	Kumagai 49'	Report	Formiga (yellow card) 47'; Irene Paredes (yellow card) 58'; Huitema (yellow card) 85'	Stadium: Parc Olympique Lyonnais; Attendance: 30,661; Referee: (France) Victoria Beyer

23 November 2019 10	Reims	1–3	Paris Saint-Germain	Reims
15:30 CEST (UTC+2)	Naomie Feller 25' (yellow card) 79'; Giorgia Spinelli (yellow card) 48'	Report	Dudek 49'; Geyoro 64'; Diani 78'	Stadium: Stade Auguste-Delaune; Attendance: 2,009; Referee: (France) Solenne Bartnik

7 December 2019 11	Paris Saint-Germain	1–1	Montpellier	Paris
15:30 CEST (UTC+2)	Nadim (yellow card) 42'; Lawrence 45'; Périsset (yellow card) 71'	Report	Puntigam (yellow card) 32'; Mondésir (yellow card) 62'; Geyoro 69' (o.g.)	Stadium: Stade Jean-Bouin; Attendance: 3,280; Referee: (France) Maika Vanderstichel

15 December 2019 12	Paris FC	0–3	Paris Saint-Germain	Paris
14:45 CEST (UTC+2)		Report	Katoto 25'; Khelifi 46'; Lawrence (yellow card) 48' (goal) 74'; Formiga (yellow card) 69'; Kiedrzynek (yellow card) 84'	Stadium: Stade Sébastien Charléty; Attendance: 2,174; Referee: (France) Elodie Coppola

18 January 2020 13	Paris Saint-Germain	11–0	Marseille	Paris
15:45 CEST (UTC+2)	Diani 5' 32' 45'; Nadim 10' 37'; Katoto 22' 40' 57'; Formiga 29' (yellow card) 62'; Baltimore 70' 79'	Report	Eva Sumo (yellow card) 51'	Stadium: Stade Jean-Bouin; Attendance: 3,536; Referee: (France) Victoria Beyer

25 January 2020 14	Paris Saint-Germain	5–1	Metz	Saint-Germain-en-Laye
15:30 CEST (UTC+2)	Khelifi 1'; Katoto 33' 41' 83'; Nadim 49' (pen.)	Report	Shnia Gordan 58'; Belkhiter (yellow card) 67'	Stadium: Stade Municipal Georges Lefèvre; Attendance: 503; Referee: (France) Camille Soriano

9 February 2020 15	Soyaux	0–3	Paris Saint-Germain	Angoulême
14:00 CEST (UTC+2)		Report	Nadim 8'; Geyoro 41'; Katoto 42'	Stadium: Stade Lebon; Attendance: 642; Referee: (France) Elodie Coppola

22 February 2020 16	Guingamp	1–4	Paris Saint-Germain	Pabu
14:30 CEST (UTC+2)	Yango (yellow card) 50'; Traoré (yellow card) 60'; Oparanozie 81' (pen.)	Report	Formiga (yellow card) 17'; Diani 20' (pen.); Lawrence 21'; Périsset (yellow card) 28'; Geyoro 83'; Baltimore 90'	Stadium: Stade Centre Formation EAG; Attendance: 798; Referee: (France) Victoria Beyer

14 March 2020 17	Paris Saint-Germain	Cancelled	Lyon

28 March 2020 18	Dijon	Cancelled	Paris Saint-Germain

4 April 2020 19	Paris Saint-Germain	Cancelled	Reims

18 April 2020 20	Montpellier	Cancelled	Paris Saint-Germain

16 May 2020 21	Bordeaux	Cancelled	Paris Saint-Germain

30 May 2020 22	Paris Saint-Germain	Cancelled	Fleury

=== Coupe de France ===
12 January 2020 Round of 32	Mazères	0–9	Paris Saint-Germain	Bizanos
14:30 CEST (UTC+2)	Hoqui (yellow card) 42'	Report	Katoto 14'; Lawrence 25'; Nadim 32'; Khelifi 45'; Geyoro 56'; Paredes 65'; Boussaha 84' (pen.), 90+1'; Baltimore 88'	Stadium: Stade du Hameau; Attendance: 2685; Referee: Charlène Laur

1 February 2020 Round of 16	Rodez	0–6	Paris Saint-Germain	Rodez
14:15 CEST (UTC+2)	Davy (yellow card) 51'	Report	Katoto 9', 15'; Boussaha 11', 83'; Sævik 18', 86'	Stadium: Stade Paul-Lignon; Attendance: 1178; Referee: Maika Vanderstichel

15 February 2020 Quarter-final	Arras	1–3	Paris Saint-Germain	Arras
16:00 CEST (UTC+2)	Cousin 10'; Herbet (yellow card) 56'; Lefevre (yellow card) 87'	Report	Nadim 11', 50'; Khelifi 40'	Stadium: Degouve-Brabant Stadium; Attendance: 948; Referee: Alexandra Collin

2 August 2020 Semi-final	Bordeaux	1–2	Paris Saint-Germain	Libourne
20:30 CEST (UTC+2)	Snoeijs 23'; Bilbault (yellow card) 56'	Report	Luana (yellow card) 15'; Geyoro (yellow card) 30'; Paredes (yellow card) 45+4', (goal) 55'; Nadim (yellow card) 56'; Bruun 84'	Stadium: Stade Jean-Antoine Moueix; Attendance: 1814; Referee: Alexandra Collin

9 August 2020 Final	Lyon	0–0 (4–3 p)	Paris Saint-Germain	Auxerre
21:00 CEST (UTC+2)	Le Sommer (yellow card) 90'	Report	Dudek (yellow card) 17'; Katoto (yellow card) 28'	Stadium: Stade de l'Abbé-Deschamps; Attendance: 4500; Referee: Victoria Beyer
	Penalties
	Majri (penalty scored); Marozsán (penalty scored); Renard (penalty scored); Le Sommer (penalty missed); Bronze (penalty scored)		(penalty scored) Nadim; (penalty scored) Däbritz; (penalty scored) Bruun; (penalty missed) Endler; (penalty missed) Khelifi

=== UEFA Women's Champions League ===
==== Knockout phase ====
===== Round of 32 =====
12 September 2019 First leg	Braga (Portugal)	0–7	(France) Paris Saint-Germain	Braga, Portugal
21:00 CEST (UTC+02:00)	Murnan (yellow card) 75'	Report	Katoto 7' (pen.), 32', 61'; Formiga 41'; Morroni (yellow card) 45'; Diani 47'; Huitema 90+3', 90+5'	Stadium: Estádio Municipal de Braga; Attendance: 5850; Referee: Lina Lehtovaara (Finland)

26 September 2019 Second leg	Paris Saint-Germain (France)	0–0	(Portugal) Braga	Paris
20:30 CEST (UTC+02:00)	Khelifi (yellow card) 18'; Baltimore (yellow card) 37'; Périsset (yellow card) 90+3'	Report	Marques (yellow card) 16'	Stadium: Stade Jean-Bouin; Attendance: 1187; Referee: Sara Persson (Sweden)

===== Round of 16 =====
16 October 2019 First leg	Breiðablik (Iceland)	0–4	(France) Paris Saint-Germain	Kópavogur, Iceland
20:30 CEST (UTC+02:00)		Report	Sævik 10'; Formiga 18'; Katoto 29'; Baltimore (yellow card) 50'; Dudek 90+2'	Stadium: Kópavogsvöllur; Attendance: 1312; Referee: Olga Zadinova (Czech Republic)

31 October 2019 Second leg	Paris Saint-Germain (France)	3–1	(Iceland) Breiðablik	Paris
20:00 CET (UTC+01:00)	Huitema 6', 78'; Diani 90+3'	Report	Þorvaldsdóttir 45+1'; Antonsdóttir (yellow card) 51'; Shala (yellow card) 56'; Lillýardóttir (yellow card) 83'	Stadium: Stade Jean-Bouin; Referee: Tess Olofsson (Sweden)

===== Quarter-finals =====
22 August 2020	Arsenal (England)	1–2	(France) Paris Saint-Germain	San Sebastián, Spain
19:30				Stadium: Anoeta Stadium; Attendance: 0 Referee: Esther Staubli (Switzerland)

===== Semi-finals =====
26 August 2020	Paris Saint-Germain (France)	0–1	(France) Lyon	San Mamés, Bilbao
20:00		Report	Renard 67'	Attendance: 0 (Note: Game was played behind closed doors); Referee: Anastasia Pustovoitova (Russia)

== Statistics ==
No.	Pos	Nat	Player	Total		Division 1 Féminine		Coupe de France		Trophée des Championnes		Champions League	
No.	Pos	Nat	Player	Apps	Goals	Apps	Goals	Apps	Goals	Apps	Goals	Apps	Goals
Goalkeepers
16	GK	(Chile) CHI	Christiane Endler	20	0	12	0	3	0	1	0	4	0
30	GK	(United States) USA	Arianna Criscione	0	0	0	0	0	0	0	0	0	0
Defenders
4	DF	(Poland) POL	Paulina Dudek	23	2	15	1	4	0	1	0	3	1
5	DF	(United States) USA	Alana Cook	11	0	5	0	2	0	0	0	4	0
12	DF	(Canada) CAN	Ashley Lawrence	18	4	9	3	3	1	1	0	5	0
14	DF	(Spain) ESP	Irene Paredes	25	2	14	0	5	2	1	0	5	0
20	DF	(France) FRA	Perle Morroni	21	0	12	0	4	0	1	0	4	0
Midfielders
6	MF	(Brazil) BRA	Luana	6	0	3	0	3	0	0	0	0	0
8	MF	(France) FRA	Grace Geyoro	24	7	16	6	4	1	1	0	3	0
13	MF	(Germany) GER	Sara Däbritz	16	4	9	4	2	0	1	0	4	0
15	MF	(Norway) NOR	Karina Sævik	17	3	11	0	2	2	0	0	4	1
21	MF	(France) FRA	Sandy Baltimore	19	5	9	4	5	1	0	0	5	0
24	MF	(Brazil) BRA	Formiga	20	3	12	1	3	0	1	0	4	2
27	MF	(France) FRA	Léa Khelifi	14	4	7	2	4	2	0	0	3	0
Forwards
9	FW	(France) FRA	Marie-Antoinette Katoto	25	24	16	16	4	3	1	0	4	5
10	FW	(Denmark) DEN	Nadia Nadim	24	12	13	8	4	3	1	1	6	0
11	FW	(France) FRA	Kadidiatou Diani	25	14	16	12	4	0	1	0	4	2
22	FW	(Denmark) DEN	Signe Bruun	4	2	0	0	2	1	0	0	2	1
23	FW	(Canada) CAN	Jordyn Huitema	19	5	11	1	3	0	1	0	4	4
Players who joined the club during COVID-19 break and became eligible for official matches
1	GK	(Germany) GER	Charlotte Voll	0	0	0	0	0	0	0	0	0	0
2	DF	(France) FRA	Bénédicte Simon	0	0	0	0	0	0	0	0	0	0
7	FW	(Switzerland) SUI	Ramona Bachmann	4	0	0	0	2	0	0	0	2	0
Players transferred out during the season
	GK	(Poland) POL	Katarzyna Kiedrzynek	9	0	5	0	2	0	0	0	2	0
	DF	(Sweden) SWE	Hanna Glas	11	1	5	1	3	0	1	0	2	0
	DF	(France) FRA	Ève Périsset	13	1	12	1	0	0	0	0	1	0
	MF	(France) FRA	Lina Boussaha	7	4	1	0	3	4	0	0	3	0
	MF	(France) FRA	Aminata Diallo	11	0	8	0	0	0	0	0	3	0
	MF	(France) FRA	Annahita Zamanian	2	0	0	0	0	0	0	0	2	0
	FW	(France) FRA	Vicki Becho	1	0	0	0	1	0	0	0	0	0

Last updated: 26 August 2020
Source: Competitions

== See also ==
- 2019–20 Paris Saint-Germain F.C. season
