= 2018–19 Paris Saint-Germain FC (women) season =

Paris Saint-Germain Féminine
2018–19 season
- President: Nasser Al-Khelaifi
- Head coach: Olivier Echouafni
- Stadium: Stade Jean-Bouin; Stade Municipal Georges Lefèvre
- Division 1 Féminine: 2nd
- Coupe de France: Quarter finals
- UEFA Women's Champions League: Quarter finals
- Top goalscorer: League: Marie-Antoinette Katoto (22); All: Marie-Antoinette Katoto (30)
Home colours	Away colours

The 2018–19 season is Paris Saint-Germain Féminine's 48th season since its creation in 1971, and its 32nd season in the top-flight of women's football in France.

== Players ==
Note: Flags indicate national team as defined under FIFA eligibility rules; some limited exceptions apply. Players may hold more than one non-FIFA nationality.

No.	Pos.	Nation	Player
1	GK	POL	Katarzyna Kiedrzynek
2	DF	SWE	Hanna Glas
3	DF	BRA	Daiane
4	DF	POL	Paulina Dudek
5	DF	USA	Alana Cook
6	MF	NOR	Andrine Hegerberg
7	MF	FRA	Aminata Diallo
8	MF	FRA	Grace Geyoro
9	FW	FRA	Marie-Antoinette Katoto
10	FW	DEN	Nadia Nadim
11	FW	FRA	Kadidiatou Diani
12	MF	CAN	Ashley Lawrence

No.	Pos.	Nation	Player
14	DF	ESP	Irene Paredes (captain)
15	DF	SWE	Emma Berglund
16	GK	CHI	Christiane Endler
17	DF	FRA	Eve Perisset
19	MF	FRA	Annahita Zamanian
20	DF	FRA	Perle Morroni
21	MF	FRA	Sandy Baltimore
22	FW	DEN	Signe Bruun
24	MF	BRA	Formiga
28	MF	CHN	Wang Shuang
30	GK	GER	Charlotte Voll

=== Out on loan ===
Note: Flags indicate national team as defined under FIFA eligibility rules; some limited exceptions apply. Players may hold more than one non-FIFA nationality.

No.	Pos.	Nation	Player
—	MF	FRA	Lina Boussaha (at Lille until 30 June 2019)
—	MF	MAR	Anissa Lahmari (at Soyaux until 30 June 2019)

No.	Pos.	Nation	Player
—	FW	TUR	Melike Pekel (at Bordeaux until 30 June 2019)
—	FW	BEL	Davinia Vanmechelen (at PSV until 30 June 2019)

== Transfers ==
Note: indicates a mid-season transfer.

=== In ===
Date	Position	Player	From	Source
4 August 2018	MF	(China) Wang Shuang	(China) Wuhan Jianghan	
9 August 2018	DF	(Brazil) Daiane	(Norway) Avaldsnes	
31 August 2018	FW	(Denmark) Signe Bruun	(Denmark) Fortuna Hjørring	
31 August 2018	MF	(France) Annahita Zamanian	(Sweden) Kopparbergs/Göteborg	
21 September 2018	DF	(Sweden) Hanna Glas	(Sweden) Eskilstuna United	
3 January 2019	FW	(Denmark) Nadia Nadim	(England) Manchester City	
15 January 2019	DF	(United States) Alana Cook	(United States) Stanford Cardinal	

=== Out ===
Position	Player	To	Source
DF	(Brazil) Érika	(Brazil) Corinthians	
DF	(France) Laure Boulleau	Retired	
DF	(France) Léa Kergal	(France) Le Havre	
MF	(France) Lina Boussaha	(France) Lille (loan)	
MF	(Morocco) Sana Daoudi	(France) Guingamp	
MF	(Morocco) Anissa Lahmari	(France) Soyaux (loan)	
FW	(France) Marie-Laure Delie	(France) Metz	
FW	(Spain) Jennifer Hermoso	(Spain) Atlético Madrid	
FW	(Turkey) Melike Pekel	(France) Bordeaux (loan)	
FW	(Belgium) Davinia Vanmechelen	(Netherlands) PSV (loan)	

== Pre-season and friendlies ==
24 July 2018 Friendly	Manchester City (England)	1–0	(France) Paris Saint-Germain	Portland
19:00 PDT (UTC-7)	Nadim 49'	Report	Lahmari (yellow card) 40'; Vagre (yellow card) 73'	Stadium: Merlo Field; Attendance: 1500; Referee: Katja Koroleva
Note: Forty minute halves.

27 July 2018 2018 Women's International Champions Cup	North Carolina Courage (United States)	2–1	(France) Paris Saint-Germain	Miami Gardens
18:15 EDT (UTC-4)	McDonald 19'; Speck (yellow card) 56'; Jenkins 84'	Report	Kurtz 40' (o.g.)	Stadium: Hard Rock Stadium; Referee: Natalie Simon

30 July 2018 2018 Women's International Champions Cup	Paris Saint-Germain (France)	1–2	(England) Manchester City	Miami Gardens
18:15 EDT (UTC-4)	Pekel 1'	Report	Scott 41'; Jans 45+4'; Houghton (yellow card) 85'	Stadium: Hard Rock Stadium; Referee: Natalie Simon

10 August 2018 Friendly	Paris Saint-Germain (France)	1–1	(Germany) Bayern Munich	Colomiers
17:30 CEST (UTC+2)	Périsset 58'	Report	Islacker 41' (pen.)	Stadium: Stade Michel Bendichou

12 August 2018 Friendly	Paris Saint-Germain (France)	2–2	(England) Arsenal	Colomiers
15:45 CEST (UTC+2)	Lahmari 76' (yellow card) 89'; Pekel 90+2'	Report	Mead 21'; Little 90' (pen.)	Stadium: Stade Michel Bendichou

17 August 2018 Friendly	Real Sociedad (Spain)	1–2	(France) Paris Saint-Germain	San Sebastián
20:00 CEST (UTC+2)	García 72'	Report	Périsset 7' (pen.); Diallo (yellow card) 78'; Diani 79'	Stadium: Zubieta; Referee: Olatz Rivera

19 August 2018 Friendly	Atlético Madrid (Spain)	1–4	(France) Paris Saint-Germain	San Sebastián
13:00 CEST (UTC+2)	Hermoso 89' (pen.)	Report	Hegerberg 31'; Pekel 54'; Morroni (yellow card) 67'; Vagre 75'; Bouzid 84'; Périsset (yellow card) 89'	Stadium: Zubieta

4 September 2018 Friendly	Paris Saint-Germain (France)	0–2	Mexico	Louveciennes
16:00 CEST (UTC+2)		Report	Corral 25'; Mayor 87'	Stadium: Complexe Sportif Le Coarer; Attendance: 30; Referee: Siham Benmahammed

== Statistics ==
No.	Pos	Nat	Player	Total		Division 1 Féminine		Coupe de France		Champions League	
No.	Pos	Nat	Player	Apps	Goals	Apps	Goals	Apps	Goals	Apps	Goals
Goalkeepers
1	GK	(Poland) POL	Katarzyna Kiedrzynek	16	0	16	0	0	0	0	0
16	GK	(Chile) CHI	Christiane Endler	16	0	7	0	3	0	6	0
30	GK	(Germany) GER	Charlotte Voll	0	0	0	0	0	0	0	0
Defenders
2	DF	(Sweden) SWE	Hanna Glas	19	1	14	1	2	0	3	0
3	DF	(Brazil) BRA	Daiane	12	0	9	0	0	0	3	0
4	DF	(Poland) POL	Paulina Dudek	21	3	16	1	2	1	3	1
5	DF	(United States) USA	Alana Cook	4	0	3	0	0	0	1	0
14	DF	(Spain) ESP	Irene Paredes	19	2	12	2	3	0	4	0
15	DF	(Sweden) SWE	Emma Berglund	10	0	7	0	1	0	2	0
17	DF	(France) FRA	Ève Périsset	22	2	15	2	2	0	5	0
20	DF	(France) FRA	Perle Morroni	23	0	18	0	2	0	3	0
Midfielders
6	MF	(Norway) NOR	Andrine Hegerberg	8	0	4	0	0	0	4	0
7	MF	(France) FRA	Aminata Diallo	24	1	18	1	3	0	3	0
8	MF	(France) FRA	Grace Geyoro	29	4	21	3	3	1	5	0
12	MF	(Canada) CAN	Ashley Lawrence	20	2	14	2	2	0	4	0
19	MF	(France) FRA	Annahita Zamanian	12	1	7	0	2	1	3	0
21	MF	(France) FRA	Sandy Baltimore	16	3	12	1	2	2	2	0
24	MF	(Brazil) BRA	Formiga	21	0	14	0	2	0	5	0
28	MF	(China) CHN	Wang Shuang	25	8	18	7	2	0	5	1
Forwards
9	FW	(France) FRA	Marie-Antoinette Katoto	29	30	20	22	3	3	6	5
10	FW	(Denmark) DEN	Nadia Nadim	10	3	8	3	2	0	0	0
11	FW	(France) FRA	Kadidiatou Diani	30	16	22	13	3	1	5	2
22	FW	(Denmark) DEN	Signe Bruun	17	4	13	3	1	0	3	1
Players transferred/loaned out during the season
	MF	(Morocco) MAR	Anissa Lahmari	8	1	6	1	0	0	2	0
	FW	(Turkey) TUR	Melike Pekel	11	1	6	0	1	0	4	1
	FW	(Belgium) BEL	Davinia Vanmechelen	2	0	1	0	0	0	1	0

Last updated: 4 May 2019
Source: Competitions
