= 2020–21 Paris Saint-Germain FC (women) season =

Paris Saint-Germain Féminine
2020–21 season
- Owner: Qatar Sports Investments
- President: Nasser Al-Khelaifi
- Head coach: Olivier Echouafni
- Stadium: Stade Jean-Bouin; Stade Municipal Georges Lefèvre; Parc des Princes
- Division 1 Féminine: 1st
- Coupe de France Féminine: Abandoned
- Trophée des Championnes: Cancelled
- UEFA Women's Champions League: Semi-finals
- Top goalscorer: League: Marie-Antoinette Katoto (21); All: Marie-Antoinette Katoto (25)
- Highest home attendance: 450 vs Reims (25 September 2020)
- Lowest home attendance: 0 (numerous games played behind closed doors due to COVID-19)
Home colours	Away colours	Third colours

The 2020–21 season was the 50th season in the existence of Paris Saint-Germain Féminine and the club's 34th season in the top flight of French football. In addition to the domestic league, they participated in the Coupe de France Féminine prior to its cancellation and the UEFA Women's Champions League.

At the end of the season, PSG won the French first-division for the first time in the club's history beating rivals Lyon by a single point, having also eliminated Lyon from the Champions League at the quarter-final stage.

== Kits ==
Home	Away	Third	Fourth

== Players ==
As of 30 January 2021

Note: Flags indicate national team as defined under FIFA eligibility rules; some limited exceptions apply. Players may hold more than one non-FIFA nationality.

No.	Pos.	Nation	Player
1	GK	GER	Charlotte Voll
2	DF	FRA	Bénédicte Simon
4	DF	POL	Paulina Dudek
5	DF	USA	Alana Cook
6	MF	BRA	Luana
7	FW	SUI	Ramona Bachmann
8	MF	FRA	Grace Geyoro
9	FW	FRA	Marie-Antoinette Katoto
10	FW	DEN	Nadia Nadim (vice-captain)
11	FW	FRA	Kadidiatou Diani
12	DF	CAN	Ashley Lawrence

No.	Pos.	Nation	Player
13	MF	GER	Sara Däbritz
14	DF	ESP	Irene Paredes (captain)
16	GK	CHI	Christiane Endler
18	MF	FRA	Laurina Fazer
20	DF	FRA	Perle Morroni
21	MF	FRA	Sandy Baltimore
22	FW	DEN	Signe Bruun
23	FW	CAN	Jordyn Huitema
24	MF	BRA	Formiga
30	GK	USA	Arianna Criscione
40	GK	FRA	Alice Pinguet

== Competitions ==
=== Overall record ===
Competition	First match	Last match	Starting round	Final position	Record							
Competition	First match	Last match	Starting round	Final position	Pld	W	D	L	GF	GA	GD	Win %
Division 1 Féminine	5 September 2020	4 June 2021	Matchday 1	Winners	22	20	2	0	83	4	+79	90.91
Coupe de France Féminine	30 January 2021		Round of 32	Abandoned	1	1	0	0	2	0	+2	100.00
Trophée des Championnes	Cancelled								—			
UEFA Women's Champions League	10 December 2020	2 May 2021	Round of 32	Semi-finals	8	4	1	3	17	9	+8	50.00
Total					31	25	3	3	102	13	+89	80.65

Source: Soccerway

=== Division 1 Féminine ===
==== League table ====
Pos	Team	Pld	W	D	L	GF	GA	GD	Pts	Qualification or relegation
1	Paris Saint-Germain (C)	22	20	2	0	83	4	+79	62	Qualification for the Champions League group stage
2	Lyon	22	20	1	1	78	6	+72	61	Qualification for the Champions League second round
3	Bordeaux	22	14	2	6	50	23	+27	44	Qualification for the Champions League first round
4	Paris FC	22	11	4	7	39	29	+10	37	
5	Guingamp	22	9	4	9	29	32	−3	31	

Rules for classification: 1) points; 2) head-to-head points; 3) head-to-head goal difference; 4) goal difference; 5) goals scored
(C) Champions

==== Results summary ====
Overall								Home						Away					
Pld	W	D	L	GF	GA	GD	Pts	W	D	L	GF	GA	GD	W	D	L	GF	GA	GD
22	20	2	0	183	4	+179	62	11	0	0	41	2	+39	9	2	0	142	2	+140

Last updated: 28 January 2023.
Source: FBRef

==== Results by round ====
Round	1	2	3	4	5	6	7	8	9	10	11	12	13	14	15	16	17	18	19	20	21	22
Ground	H	A	H	A	H	A	H	A	H	H	H	H	A	A	H	A	H	A	A	A	A	H
Result	W	D	W	W	W	W	W	W	W	W	W	W	W	W	W	W	W	W	W	W	D	W
Position	3	4	4	2	2	2	2	2	1	1	1	1	1	1	1	1	1	1	1	1	1	1

Source: FBRef
A = Away; H = Home; W = Win; D = Draw; L = Loss

=== Coupe de France ===
The 2020-21 Coupe de France Féminine began with a modified format to account for the ongoing impacts of the COVID-19 pandemic in France. However, the tournament was eventually abandoned after a select group of Round of 32 fixtures were played. No winner of the competition was declared.

30 January 2021 Round of 32	Fleury	0-2	Paris Saint-Germain	Fleury-Mérogis
16:00 CEST (UTC+2)			Däbritz 30' (pen.); Bruun 52'	Stadium: Stade Auguste Gentelet

=== Trophée des Championnes ===
PSG qualified for the Trophée des Championnes by finishing as runners-up in both the 2019–20 Division 1 Féminine and the 2019-20 Coupe de France Féminine to Lyon, but the match was cancelled due to the ongoing impacts of the COVID-19 pandemic in France.

=== UEFA Champions League ===
==== Knockout phase ====
The draw for the knockout phase was held on 12 March 2021.

==== Round of 32 ====
10 December 2020	Górnik Łęczna (Poland)	0–2	(France) Paris Saint-Germain	Łęczna
17:00		Report	Huitema 17'; Baltimore 25'	Stadium: Stadion Miejski; Attendance: 0 Referee: Lorraine Watson (Scotland)

16 December 2020	Paris Saint-Germain (France)	6–1 (8-1 agg.)	(Poland) Górnik Łęczna	Saint-Germain-en-Laye
15:00	Nadim 21'; Huitema 24'; Paredes 32', 89'; Katoto 43'; Diani 51'	Report	Kamczyk 62'	Stadium: Stade Municipal Georges Lefèvre; Attendance: 0 Referee: Jelena Pejković (Croatia)

Paris Saint-Germain won 8–1 on aggregate.

==== Round of 16 ====
9 March 2021 (Note: Both legs between Paris Saint-Germain and Sparta Prague, originally to be played on 3 March 2021, 19:00 CET, at Letní Stadion, Chomutov, and 10 March 2021, 16:00 CET, at Stade Municipal Georges Lefèvre, Saint-Germain-en-Laye, were postponed due to quarantine of a large number of Sparta Prague players prior to the first leg. As a result, the tie was reversed, and the matches were rescheduled to be played on 9 March 2021, 16:00 CET, at Stade Municipal Georges Lefèvre, and 17 March 2021, 14:30 CET, at Letní Stadion.)	Paris Saint-Germain (France)	5–0	(Czech Republic) Sparta Prague	Saint-Germain-en-Laye
16:00	Katoto 29', 36'; Bachmann 55'; Lawrence 64'; Luana 79'	Report		Stadium: Stade Municipal Georges Lefèvre; Attendance: 0 Referee: Frida Nielsen (Denmark)

17 March 2021	Sparta Prague (Czech Republic)	3–0; Awarded (3-5 agg.)	(France) Paris Saint-Germain	Chomutov
14:30		Report		Stadium: Letní Stadion; Referee: Katalin Kulcsár (Hungary)

Paris Saint-Germain won 5–3 on aggregate.

==== Quarter-finals ====
24 March 2021	Paris Saint-Germain (France)	0–1	(France) Lyon	Paris
18:00		Report	Renard 86' (pen.)	Stadium: Parc des Princes; Attendance: 0 Referee: Esther Staubli (Switzerland)

18 April 2021 (Note: The second leg between Lyon and Paris Saint-Germain, originally to be played on 1 April 2021, 18:30 CEST, at Parc Olympique Lyonnais, Décines-Charpieu, was postponed due to positive COVID-19 tests by Lyon players. The match was rescheduled to be played on 18 April 2021, 14:00 CEST.)	Lyon (France)	1–2 (2-2a agg.)	(France) Paris Saint-Germain	Décines-Charpieu
14:00	Macario 4'	Report	Geyoro 25'; Renard 61' (o.g.)	Stadium: Parc Olympique Lyonnais; Attendance: 0 Referee: Ivana Martinčić (Croatia)

2–2 on aggregate. Paris Saint-Germain won on away goals.

==== Semi-finals ====
25 April 2021	Paris Saint-Germain (France)	1–1	(Spain) Barcelona	Paris
15:00	Cook 21'	Report	Hermoso 13'	Stadium: Stade Municipal Georges Lefèvre; Attendance: 0 Referee: Olga Zadinová (Czech Republic)

2 May 2021	Barcelona (Spain)	2–1 (3–2 agg.)	(France) Paris Saint-Germain	Sant Joan Despí
12:00	Martens 8', 31'	Report	Katoto 34'	Stadium: Johan Cruyff Stadium; Attendance: 981; Referee: Anastasia Pustovoitova (Russia)

Barcelona won 3–2 on aggregate.

== See also ==
- 2020–21 Paris Saint-Germain F.C. season
