= Irene Paredes =

Spanish footballer (born 1991)

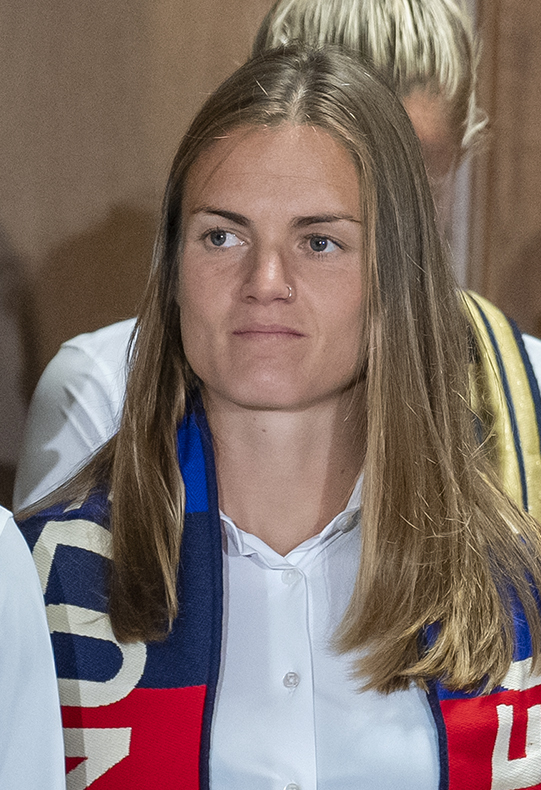
- Paredes in 2023

Personal information
- Full name: Irene Paredes Hernández
- Date of birth: 4 July 1991 (age 35)
- Place of birth: Legazpi, Spain
- Height: 1.77 m (5 ft 10 in)
- Position: Centre-back

Team information
- Current team: Barcelona
- Number: 2

Youth career
- 2005–2006: Ilintxa
- 2006–2007: Urola
- 2007–2008: Zarautz

Senior career*
Years	Team	Apps	(Gls)
2008–2011	Real Sociedad	82	(6)
2011–2016	Athletic Bilbao	128	(18)
2016–2021	Paris Saint-Germain	85	(13)
2021–	Barcelona	90	(8)

International career^{‡}
2011–	Spain	117	(14)
2012–2022	Basque Country	4	(0)
Medal record
Women's football
Representing Spain
FIFA Women's World Cup
Winner	2023 Australia–New Zealand
UEFA Women's Championship
Runner-up	2025 Switzerland
UEFA Women's Nations League
Winner	2024 France–Netherlands–Spain
- * Club domestic league appearances and goals as of 20:24, 10 May 2024 (UTC) ‡ National team caps and goals as of 18:52, 9 April 2024 (UTC)

Irene Paredes Hernández (born 4 July 1991) is a Spanish professional footballer who plays as a centre-back for Liga F club Barcelona and captains the Spain national team.

== Club career ==
=== Real Sociedad ===
Born in Legazpi, Gipuzkoa in the Basque Country, Paredes joined local side Zarautz in 2007. She then moved to Real Sociedad a year later. On 5 October 2008, she made her senior debut against Málaga in a league game.

=== Athletic Bilbao ===
After spending three seasons at Real Sociedad, Paredes signed for their local rivals, Athletic Bilbao, in 2011. She was sent off for the first time in her career in their 2–1 loss to Espanyol after extra time in the 2012 Copa de la Reina final, and further disappointment followed in the next two years as Athletic lost a title-deciding league fixture against Barcelona in 2013, then were defeated by the same opposition in the 2014 Copa de la Reina final with Paredes the only player not to score their kick in the penalty shootout. However, in the last of her five seasons there, 2015–16, the club finished as league champions. She also won three Copa Euskal Herria against her former club Real Sociedad in 2011, 2013 and 2015.

=== Paris Saint-Germain ===
In 2016, Paredes signed for Paris Saint-Germain. She played her first UEFA Champions League season after joining PSG and reached the final, where her team lost 6–7 on penalties to Lyon.

On 31 May 2018, she won her first trophy with the club as PSG defeated Lyon 1–0 in the final of the 2018 Coupe de France Féminine. She was named as captain of PSG before the start of the 2018–19 season.

In May 2019, Paredes extended her contract with PSG for two more years, keeping her at the club till 30 June 2021. On 21 September, Paredes played in her first final as captain as PSG were defeated 3–4 on penalties by Lyon in the inaugural Trophée des Championnes.

On 4 June 2021, Paredes led PSG to their first-ever league title, ending Lyon's run of 14 consecutive titles. She also led PSG to the semifinals of the Champions League where her team lost to eventual champions Barcelona.

=== Barcelona ===
On 8 July 2021, Paredes signed a two-year deal with Barcelona after her contract with PSG expired. On 4 September, Paredes made her official Barcelona debut in a 5–0 routing of Granadilla Tenerife. On 17 October, Paredes scored her first goal for Barcelona in a 5–0 victory against Sporting Huelva. On 17 November, she scored her first Champions League goal for Barcelona as she headed in the second goal in a 5–0 defeat of 1899 Hoffenheim in the group stage.

On 23 January 2022, Paredes won her first title with Barcelona after her side thrashed Atlético Madrid 7–0 in the final to win their second Supercopa de España Femenina title. On 9 February, Paredes returned after recovering from Covid-19 and scored the fourth goal in the 9–1 thrashing of Real Sociedad. On 13 February, Paredes suffered a muscle tear in her left thigh during their 3–0 win against Athletic Bilbao and was ruled out for over four weeks. On 13 March, Paredes won her second Spanish league title, and her first with Barça, after Barcelona won 5–0 against Real Madrid. On 22 March, Paredes returned from her injury when she came on at the 65th minute in a 3–1 victory against Real Madrid in the first leg of the Champions League quarter final. On 30 March, she made her Camp Nou debut in the return leg of Barça's 5–2 quarter final victory against Real Madrid. On 21 May, Paredes started against Lyon as Barcelona were defeated 1–3 in the Champions League final at the Allianz Stadium in Turín. On 29 May, she won her third trophy with Barcelona as her team thrashed Sporting Huelva 6–1 in the Copa de la Reina final.

On 18 August, Paredes was announced as the fifth captain of Barcelona before the start of the new season.

On 19 January 2023, Paredes was sent off during Barcelona's 3–1 victory over Real Madrid in the semi-final of the 2022–23 Supercopa de España Femenina and was subsequently suspended for the final. Three days later, her side defeated Real Sociedad 3–0 to win the trophy. On 27 January, Paredes extended her contract with Barcelona until June 2025. On 30 April, she won her second league title with Barcelona when her side beat Sporting Huelva 3–0. On 3 June, Paredes played the entire match as Barcelona won 3–2 against VfL Wolfsburg in the final to win her first Champions League title.

She began the 2023–24 season with some injury and illness problems, but recovered to become the leader of the team's defence in the absence of Mapi León due to a long-term injury. To end Barcelona's perfect season, Paredes made a goal-line clearance in the 2024 Champions League final against Lyon, helping to win her second consecutive Champions League title.

== International career ==
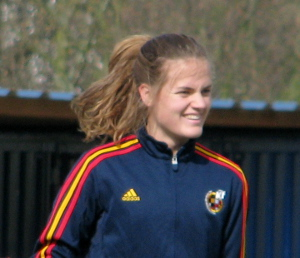
Paredes with Spain in 2012

She played her first minutes for the Spain national team in November 2011 against Romania. In June 2013, national team coach Ignacio Quereda confirmed Paredes as a member of his 23-player squad for the UEFA Euro 2013 finals in Sweden. On 27 October 2013, she scored her first goal for Spain, in a 6–0 home win against Estonia at a 2015 FIFA World Cup qualification match. She was also called up to be part of Spain's squad at the 2015 World Cup in Canada and at the 2019 World Cup in France. On 5 March 2018, she marked her 50th appearance for Spain by opening the scoring with a header in a 2–0 victory against Czech Republic in the last group match of the Cyprus Cup.

On 14 February 2022, Paredes was ruled out of the inaugural edition of the Arnold Clark Cup after suffering a muscle tear in her left thigh and was replaced by Sheila García.

Paredes was part of the Spain squad called up for the Euro 2022.

Paredes was called up to the 23-player Spain squad for the 2023 World Cup.

On 6 April 2023, Paredes made her return to the national team in a 4–2 international friendly win against Norway after she had resigned from the national team, along with her captaincy role in October 2022, following disagreements between a few players and the RFEF over unfavourable conditions in the dressing room. On 20 August, she won the World Cup after Spain defeated England 1–0 in the final. On 1 December, she returned from injury to play her 100th match for the national team in a 2–3 defeat against Italy in a group stage match of the 2023–24 UEFA Nations League.

On 25 July 2024, Paredes was called up to the Spain squad for the 2024 Olympics where they lost to Germany in the Bronze Medal Match.

On 10 June 2025, Paredes was called up to the Spain squad for the Euro 2025.

== Personal life ==
Paredes is in a relationship with former Spain hockey player Lucía Ybarra. During her stint at PSG, the couple lived together in Saint-Germain-en-Laye.

In April 2021, Paredes and Ybarra announced that they were expecting their first child together. On 13 September, Paredes announced the arrival of their son Mateo, who was born the day before, in an Instagram post. Paredes had already asked coach Jorge Vilda not to summon her to the national squad for 2023 FIFA World Cup qualification due to the forthcoming birth. Ybarra and Mateo accompanied Paredes to the 2023 World Cup tournament in New Zealand and Australia. In February 2026, Paredes and her partner Ybarra welcomed their second child, Lea Paredes Ybarra, whose name was announced via Ybarra's Instagram post a week after the child's birth.

== Style of play ==
She is a ball-playing defender who contributes to the build-up by moving the ball up the field and connecting with attackers. She is also a target inside the opponent's penalty area during free-kicks and corners, where she has scored goals via headers.

== Career statistics ==
=== Club ===
As of 10 May 2024

Appearances and goals by club, season and competition
Club	Season	League			National cup		UWCL		Other		Total	
Club	Season	Division	Apps	Goals	Apps	Goals	Apps	Goals	Apps	Goals	Apps	Goals
Real Sociedad	2008–09	Superliga Femenina	27	0	0	0	–		–		27	0
Real Sociedad	2009–10	Superliga Femenina	28	4	2	0	–		–		30	4
Real Sociedad	2010–11	Superliga Femenina	27	2	5	1	–		–		32	3
Real Sociedad	Total		82	6	7	1	–		–		89	7
Athletic Bilbao	2011–12	Primera División	33	2	2	0	–		–		35	2
Athletic Bilbao	2012–13	Primera División	19	2	2	1	–		–		21	3
Athletic Bilbao	2013–14	Primera División	30	2	5	0	–		–		35	2
Athletic Bilbao	2014–15	Primera División	21	3	1	0	–		–		22	3
Athletic Bilbao	2015–16	Primera División	25	9	1	0	–		–		26	9
Athletic Bilbao	Total		128	19	11	1	–		–		139	20
Paris Saint-Germain	2016–17	Division 1 Féminine	18	2	2	0	9	3	–		29	5
Paris Saint-Germain	2017–18	Division 1 Féminine	20	3	5	2	–		–		25	5
Paris Saint-Germain	2018–19	Division 1 Féminine	12	2	3	0	4	0	–		19	2
Paris Saint-Germain	2019–20	Division 1 Féminine	14	0	5	2	5	0	1 (Note: Appearance in Trophée des Championnes)	0	25	2
Paris Saint-Germain	2020–21	Division 1 Féminine	21	6	–		6	2	–		27	8
Paris Saint-Germain	Total		85	13	15	4	24	5	1	0	125	22
Barcelona	2021–22	Primera División	24	4	2	0	10	1	2 (Note: Appearance(s) in Supercopa de España Femenina)	0	38	5
Barcelona	2022–23	Primera División	25	2	0	0	11	2	1	0	37	4
Barcelona	2023–24	Primera División	18	0	5	0	6	0	2	0	31	0
Barcelona	2024–25	Primera División	23	2	4	1	10	2	2	0	39	5
Barcelona	Total		90	8	11	1	37	5	7	0	144	14
Career total			385	46	44	7	61	10	8	0	498	63

=== International ===
Scores and results list Spain's goal tally first, score column indicates score after each Paredes goal.

List of international goals scored by Irene Paredes
No.	Date	Venue	Opponent	Score	Result	Competition
1	27 October 2013	Ciudad Deportiva Collado Villalba, Collado Villalba, Spain	Estonia	6–0	6–0	2015 FIFA Women's World Cup qualification
2	20 September 2016	Butarque, Leganés, Spain	Finland	2–0	5–0	UEFA Women's Euro 2017 qualifying
3	20 September 2016	Butarque, Leganés, Spain	Finland	3–0	5–0	UEFA Women's Euro 2017 qualifying
4	23 October 2017	Ramat Gan Stadium, Ramat Gan, Israel	Israel	1–0	6–0	2019 FIFA Women's World Cup qualification
5	23 October 2017	Ramat Gan Stadium, Ramat Gan, Israel	Israel	3–0	6–0	2019 FIFA Women's World Cup qualification
6	28 November 2017	Estadi de Son Moix, Palma, Spain	Austria	3–0	4–0	2019 FIFA Women's World Cup qualification
7	5 March 2018	AEK Arena – Georgios Karapatakis, Larnaca, Cyprus	Czech Republic	1–0	2–0	2018 Cyprus Women's Cup
8	6 April 2018	Telia 5G -areena, Helsinki, Finland	Finland	1–0	2–0	2019 FIFA Women's World Cup qualification
9	8 October 2019	Ďolíček, Prague, Czech Republic	Czech Republic	4–0	5–1	UEFA Women's Euro 2021 qualifying
10	8 July 2022	Stadium MK, Milton Keynes, England	Finland	1–1	4–1	UEFA Women's Euro 2022
11	2 September 2022	La Ciudad del Fútbol, Las Rozas de Madrid, Spain	Hungary	2–0	3–0	2023 FIFA Women's World Cup qualification
12	4 June 2024	Estadio Heliodoro Rodríguez López, Santa Cruz de Tenerife, Spain	Denmark	2–2	3–2	UEFA Women's Euro 2025 qualifying
13	3 August 2024	Stade de Lyon, Décines-Charpieu, France	Colombia	2–2	2–2 (a.e.t.) (4–2 p)	2024 Summer Olympics
14	7 July 2025	Arena Thun, Thun, Switzerland	Belgium	2–1	6–2	UEFA Women's Euro 2025

== Honours ==
Athletic Bilbao

- Primera División: 2015–16

Paris Saint-Germain

- Division 1 Féminine: 2020–21
- Coupe de France Féminine: 2017–18

Barcelona

- Primera División: 2021–22, 2022–23, 2023–24, 2024–25, 2025–26
- Copa de la Reina: 2021–22, 2023–24, 2024–25, 2025–26
- Supercopa de España Femenina: 2021–22, 2022–23, 2023–24, 2024–25, 2025–26
- UEFA Women's Champions League: 2022–23, 2023–24, 2025–26

Spain

- FIFA Women's World Cup: 2023
- UEFA Women's Championship runner-up: 2025
- UEFA Women's Nations League: 2023–24, 2025
- Algarve Cup: 2017
- Cyprus Cup: 2018

Individual

- Algarve Cup Best player: 2017
- FIFA FIFPro World XI: 2017
- UEFA Women's Championship Team of the Tournament: 2025
- UEFA Women's Champions League Squad of the Season: 2020–21, 2022–23, 2023–24
- UEFA Women's Champions League Defender of the Season: 2020–21
- IFFHS Women's UEFA Team (Substitute): 2021
- The Best FIFA Women's 11: 2024, 2025
