= Ève Périsset =

French footballer (born 1994)

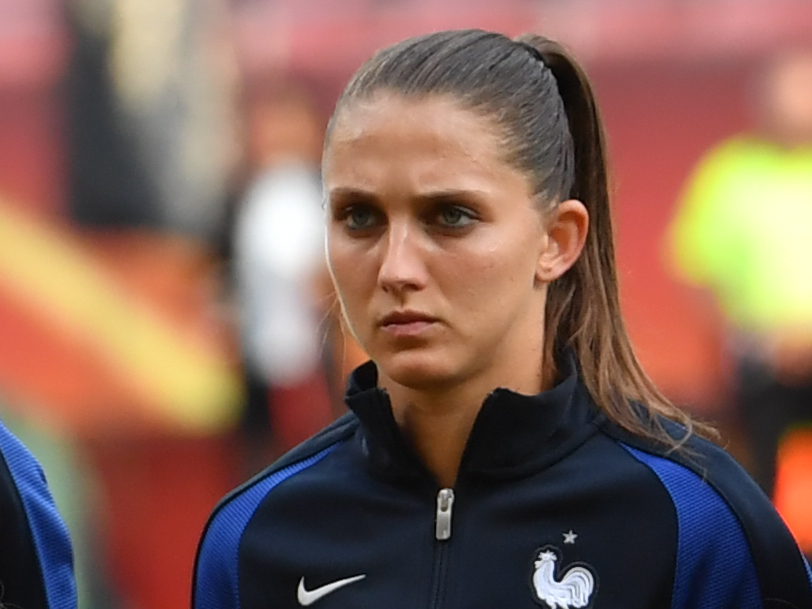
- Périsset with France in 2017

Personal information
- Full name: Ève Josette Noelle Périsset
- Date of birth: 24 December 1994 (age 31)
- Place of birth: Saint-Priest, France
- Height: 1.59 m (5 ft 3 in)
- Position: Right-back

Team information
- Current team: Montreal Roses
- Number: 27

Youth career
- 2000–2004: AS Manissieux-St-Priest
- 2004–2009: AS Saint-Priest
- 2009–2012: Lyon

Senior career*
| Years | Team | Apps | (Gls) |
| 2012–2016 | Lyon | 18 | (1) |
| 2016–2020 | Paris Saint-Germain | 69 | (8) |
| 2020–2022 | Bordeaux | 39 | (3) |
| 2022–2025 | Chelsea | 33 | (2) |
| 2025 | Strasbourg | 8 | (0) |
| 2025–2026 | Tigres UANL | 27 | (0) |
| 2026– | Montreal Roses | 0 | (0) |

International career
| 2009 | France U16 | 4 | (0) |
| 2009 | France U17 | 4 | (0) |
| 2014 | France U20 | 6 | (0) |
| 2015–2016 | France U23 | 6 | (0) |
| 2016–2024 | France | 61 | (4) |
Medal record
Women's football
Representing France
UEFA Women's Nations League
| Runner-up | 2024 |
FIFA U-20 Women's World Cup
| Third place | 2014 Canada |
- * Club domestic league appearances and goals as of 7 July 2026

Ève Josette Noelle Périsset (born 24 December 1994) is a French professional footballer who plays as a right-back for Northern Super League club Montreal Roses FC.

== Club career ==
Périsset started her professional career at Lyon in 2012. Her first season ended with a UEFA Women's Champions League final defeat to German club Wolfsburg. She was part of the squads that won three Division 1 Féminine titles and three Coupe de France trophies in a row between 2013 and 2016.

Périsset won the 2015–16 Champions League with Lyon, who beat Wolfsburg 4–3 on penalties after a 1–1 draw in the final in Italy. The defender was an unused substitute in the final and, despite winning seven trophies at Lyon, she only made 18 league appearances across the last three seasons.

In 2016, she moved to fellow French club Paris Saint-Germain. Périsset immediately established herself as a regular starter, making 36 appearances in her debut campaign and helping the team reach the 2016–17 Champions League final. Périsset played 94 minutes of that match and, with the score at 0–0 after extra time, PSG were narrowly beaten 7–6 on penalties by her former club Lyon.

The following season, she made a further 27 appearances as Paris Saint-Germain won the Coupe de France. On 19 June 2020, Bordeaux announced the signing of Périsset on a two-year deal.

On 8 June 2022, Périsset joined Women's Super League club Chelsea on a three-year deal. She played 32 times in all competitions in her first season and helped Chelsea win both the 2022–23 WSL and FA Cup trophies.

The 2023–24 season saw Périsset play 25 matches as the Blues successfully retained their WSL league title. On 20 November 2024, the Frenchwoman scored her first goal for Chelsea in a 3–0 Champions League victory over Celtic at Stamford Bridge.

On 31 January 2025, her contract with Chelsea was terminated on a mutual agreement. She joined Strasbourg on the same day on a contract until the end of the season.

On 8 July 2026, it was announced that Périsset had joined Northern Super League club Montreal Roses FC.

== International career ==
Périsset participated in several French youth teams. In 2014, she was part of the squad that finished third at the 2014 FIFA U-20 Women's World Cup in Canada.

Périsset made her senior team debut on 16 September 2016 in a 1–1 draw against Brazil. In 2017, she was among the 23 women who represented France at the UEFA Women's Euro 2017.

Périsset was called up to the France squad for the 2019 FIFA Women's World Cup, where she started once and made a further two substitute appearances.

On 30 May 2022, Périsset was named in the France squad for the UEFA Women's Euro 2022. She started four of the team's five matches at the Euros and scored a 102nd-minute extra time penalty to knock out defending champions Netherlands. After that 1–0 win, France were beaten 2–1 by Germany in the semi-finals.

Périsset was called up to the France squad for the 2023 FIFA Women's World Cup. At the tournament, Périsset played four times and got one assist, with France losing to joint hosts Australia on penalties in the quarter-finals.

In July 2024, Périsset was named in hosts France's squad for the 2024 Olympics and she featured in one game. The French lost 1–0 to eventual finalists Brazil at the quarter-final stage.

== Career statistics ==
=== Club ===
As of match played 22 January 2025

Appearances and goals by club, season and competition
| Club | Season | League | | | National cup | | League cup | | Continental | | Total | |
| Club | Season | Division | Apps | Goals | Apps | Goals | Apps | Goals | Apps | Goals | Apps | Goals |
|---|---|---|---|---|---|---|---|---|---|---|---|---|
| Lyon | 2012–13 | D1 Féminine | 0 | 0 | 0 | 0 | — | | 1 | 0 | 1 | 0 |
| Lyon | 2013–14 | D1 Féminine | 6 | 0 | 2 | 0 | — | | 1 | 0 | 9 | 0 |
| Lyon | 2014–15 | D1 Féminine | 10 | 1 | 2 | 0 | — | | 0 | 0 | 12 | 1 |
| Lyon | 2015–16 | D1 Féminine | 2 | 0 | 2 | 0 | — | | 2 | 0 | 6 | 0 |
| Lyon | Total | | 18 | 1 | 6 | 0 | 0 | 0 | 4 | 0 | 28 | 1 |
| Paris Saint-Germain | 2016–17 | D1 Féminine | 21 | 3 | 6 | 1 | — | | 9 | 0 | 36 | 4 |
| Paris Saint-Germain | 2017–18 | D1 Féminine | 21 | 2 | 6 | 1 | — | | — | | 27 | 3 |
| Paris Saint-Germain | 2018–19 | D1 Féminine | 15 | 2 | 2 | 0 | — | | 5 | 0 | 22 | 2 |
| Paris Saint-Germain | 2019–20 | D1 Féminine | 12 | 1 | 0 | 0 | — | | 1 | 0 | 13 | 1 |
| Paris Saint-Germain | Total | | 69 | 8 | 14 | 2 | 0 | 0 | 15 | 0 | 98 | 10 |
| Bordeaux | 2019–20 | D1 Féminine | — | | 1 | 0 | — | | — | | 1 | 0 |
| Bordeaux | 2020–21 | D1 Féminine | 21 | 0 | 1 | 0 | — | | — | | 22 | 0 |
| Bordeaux | 2021–22 | D1 Féminine | 18 | 3 | 1 | 0 | — | | 4 | 0 | 23 | 3 |
| Bordeaux | Total | | 39 | 3 | 3 | 0 | 0 | 0 | 4 | 0 | 46 | 3 |
| Chelsea | 2022–23 | Women's Super League | 18 | 0 | 3 | 0 | 3 | 0 | 8 | 0 | 32 | 0 |
| Chelsea | 2023–24 | Women's Super League | 13 | 0 | 3 | 0 | 3 | 0 | 6 | 0 | 25 | 0 |
| Chelsea | 2024–25 | Women's Super League | 2 | 0 | 0 | 0 | 1 | 0 | 4 | 2 | 7 | 2 |
| Chelsea | Total | | 33 | 0 | 6 | 0 | 7 | 0 | 18 | 2 | 64 | 2 |
| Career total | | | 159 | 12 | 29 | 2 | 7 | 0 | 41 | 2 | 236 | 16 |

=== International ===
As of match played 31 July 2024

Appearances and goals by national team and year
| National team | Year | Apps | Goals |
|---|---|---|---|
| France | 2016 | 2 | 0 |
| France | 2017 | 7 | 0 |
| France | 2018 | 3 | 0 |
| France | 2019 | 6 | 0 |
| France | 2020 | 3 | 1 |
| France | 2021 | 9 | 2 |
| France | 2022 | 14 | 1 |
| France | 2023 | 11 | 0 |
| France | 2024 | 6 | 0 |
| Total | | 61 | 4 |

Scores and results list France's goal tally first, score column indicates score after each Périsset goal.

List of international goals scored by Ève Périsset
| No. | Date | Venue | Opponent | Score | Result | Competition |
|---|---|---|---|---|---|---|
| 1 | 1 December 2020 | Stade de la Rabine, Vannes, France | Kazakhstan | 7–0 | 12–0 | 2022 UEFA Women's Euro qualification |
| 2 | 22 October 2021 | Stade Dominique Duvauchelle, Créteil, France | Estonia | 3–0 | 11–0 | 2023 FIFA Women's World Cup qualification |
| 3 | 26 November 2021 | Stade de la Rabine, Vannes, France | Kazakhstan | 4–0 | 6–0 | 2023 FIFA Women's World Cup qualification |
| 4 | 23 July 2022 | New York Stadium, Rotherham, England | Netherlands | 1–0 | 1–0 | UEFA Women's Euro 2022 |

== Honours ==
Olympique Lyonnais

- Première Ligue: 2013–14, 2014–15, 2015–16
- Coupe de France Féminine: 2013–14, 2014–15, 2015–16
- UEFA Women's Champions League: 2015–16
- UEFA Women's Champions League runner-up: 2012–13

Paris Saint-Germain

- Coupe de France Féminine: 2017–18
- Coupe de France Féminine runner-up: 2016–17
- UEFA Women's Champions League runner-up: 2016–17

Chelsea

- FA Women's Super League: 2022–23, 2023–24
- Women's FA Cup: 2022–23
- FA Women's League Cup runner-up: 2022–23

UANL

- Liga MX Femenil: Apertura 2025

Individual

- LFFP Première Ligue team of the season: 2016–17, 2018–19
