= 2022 Trophée des Championnes =

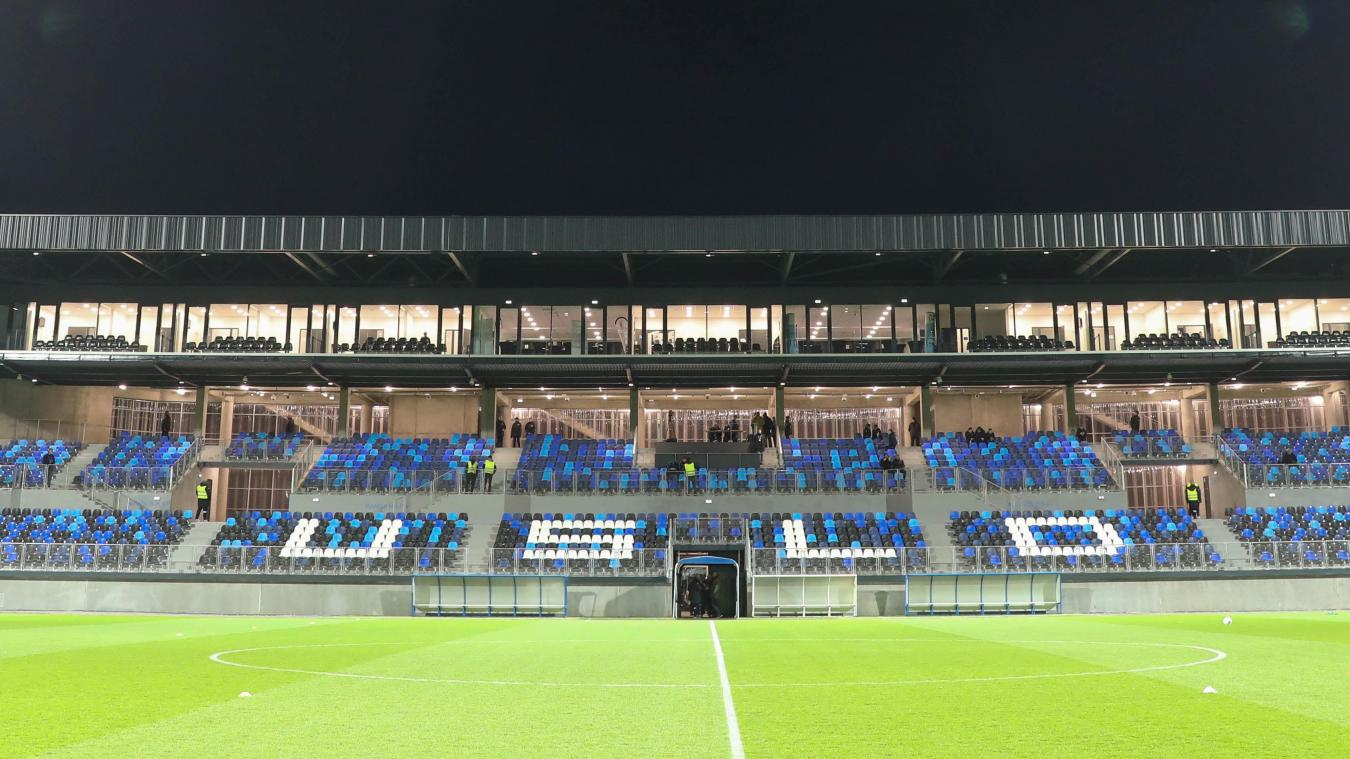
- The Stade Marcel-Tribut in Dunkirk hosted the match
- Event: Trophée des Championnes
| Lyon | Paris Saint-Germain |
| 1 | 0 |
- Date: 28 August 2022
- Venue: Stade Marcel-Tribut, Dunkirk
- Referee: Émeline Rochebilière
- Attendance: 4,472

The 2022 Trophée des Championnes was the 2nd edition of the French Super Cup. The match was contested by the 2021–22 Division 1 Féminine champions, Lyon, and the 2021–22 Coupe de France Féminine winners, Paris Saint-Germain. The match was played at the Stade Marcel-Tribut in Dunkirk on 28 August 2022.

== Match ==
=== Details ===
28 August 2022
21:00

| Lyon | 1–0 | Paris Saint-Germain |
|---|---|---|
| Van de Donk 13' |

Stade Marcel-Tribut, Dunkirk
Attendance: 4,472
Referee: Émeline Rochebilière
