= Hanna Glas =

Swedish footballer (born 1993)

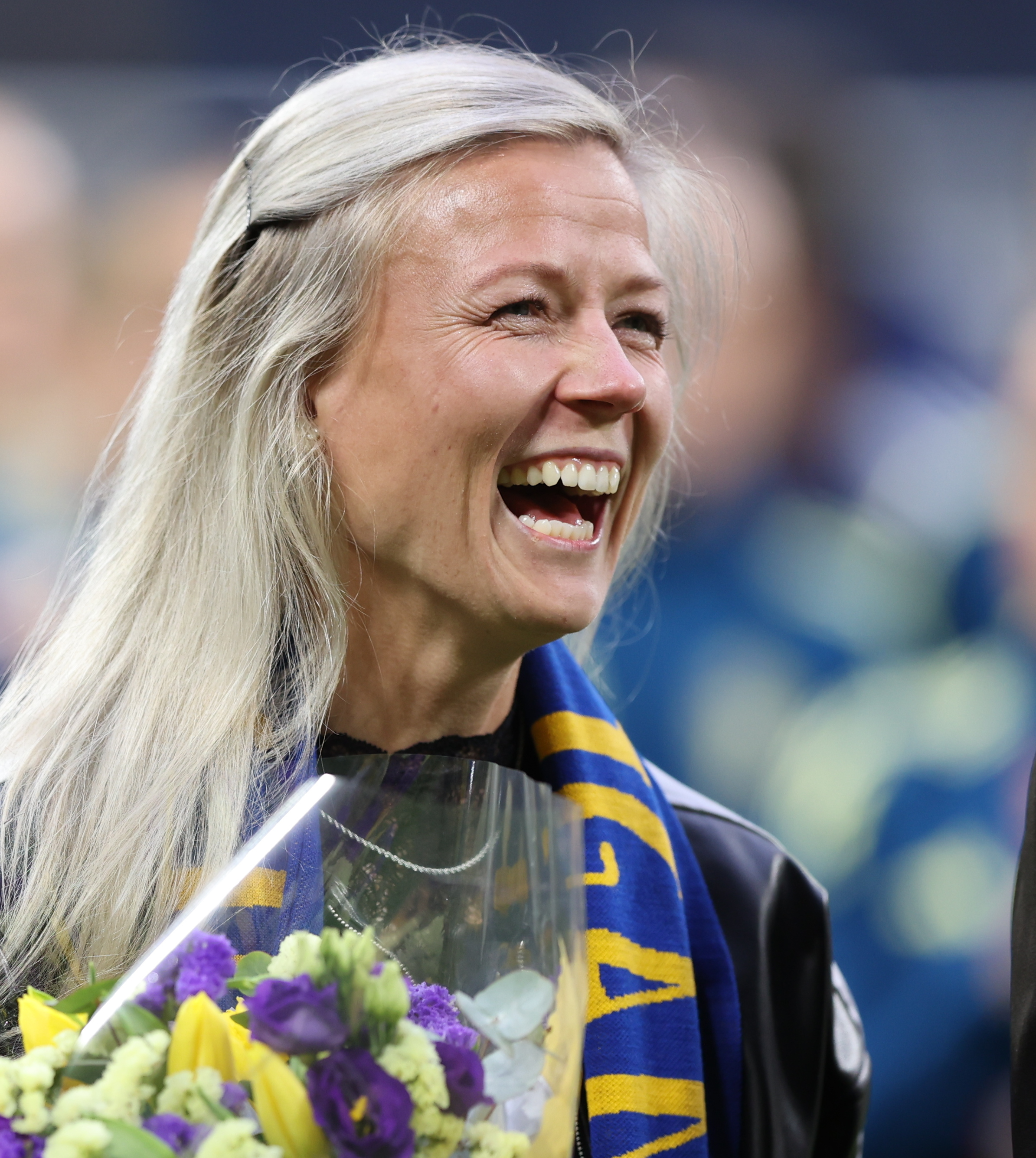
- Glas in 2026

Personal information
- Full name: Hanna Erica Maria Glas
- Date of birth: 16 April 1993 (age 33)
- Place of birth: Sundsvall, Sweden
- Height: 1.72 m (5 ft 8 in)
- Position: Defender

Senior career*
Years	Team	Apps	(Gls)
2011–2012	Sundsvalls DFF	39	(3)
2013	Sunnanå SK	0	(0)
2014–2016	Umeå IK	49	(3)
2017–2018	Eskilstuna United	44	(1)
2018–2020	Paris Saint-Germain	25	(2)
2020–2023	Bayern Munich	63	(8)
2023–2024	Kansas City Current	1	(0)
2024–2025	Seattle Reign	8	(0)
Total		229	(17)

International career^{‡}
2009–2010	Sweden U17	14	(0)
2011–2012	Sweden U19	12	(0)
2013–2015	Sweden U23	11	(0)
2017–2024	Sweden	59	(1)
Medal record
Women's football
Representing Sweden
Olympic Games
Silver medal – second place	2020 Tokyo
FIFA Women's World Cup
Third place	2019 France
- * Club domestic league appearances and goals as of 8 November 2025 ‡ National team caps and goals as of 12 July 2024

Hanna Erica Maria Glas (born 16 April 1993) is a Swedish former professional footballer who played as a defender. She earned 59 caps for the Sweden national team.

== Club career ==
Glas began her football career at Sundsvalls DFF of Sweden's second division, the Elitettan. Glas' first experience with a professional team was in 2013, when she joined Sunnanå SK of the Damallsvenskan. In March 2013, Glas suffered the second ACL tear of her career in a pre-season match against Umeå IK. As a result, she missed the entire 2013 Damallsvenskan season.

In November 2013, she joined Umeå IK and played sixteen matches in her first season, scoring two goals. At the end of the 2014 Damallsvenskan season, Glas extended her contract with Umeå for another year. Glas played most of the 2015 Damallsvenskan season before tearing her ACL for the third time in September 2015 in a match against Kopparberg/Goeteborg FC (now BK Häcken). Ahead of the 2016 season, she extended her contract at the club by two years. She spent most of the season rehabilitating her injury, and was back in action at the end of August, playing 10 games for the club. At the end of the 2016 season, Umeå were relegated to the Elitettan after 19 straight seasons in Sweden's top division.

In November 2016, Glas left relegated Umeå IK to sign a two-year contract with Eskilstuna United. In 2018, she transferred to Paris Saint-Germain. Glas made just five league appearances in her second season with PSG. She joined Bayern Munich on a three-year deal in 2020.

On 25 April 2021, in the first leg of Bayern's UEFA Women's Champions League semifinal against Chelsea, Glas gave an assist to Sydney Lohmann and then scored Bayern's match-winner. In the second leg, Bayern were defeated 4–1 by Chelsea. On 19 May 2021, UEFA selected Glas' goal against Chelsea as the best goal of the 2020–21 tournament. On 6 June 2021, Glas earned the first major club title of her career when Bayern became Frauen-Bundesliga champions for the first time since 2016.

Glas missed the entire 2022–2023 Frauen Bundesliga season when she tore her ACL for a fourth time in September 2022 during a training session with the national team.

In 2023, she signed a two-year contract with the Kansas City Current. Prior to the start of the 2023 season, however, Glas suffered a season-ending knee injury that kept her sidelined until a July 27, 2024 game against Pachuca in the 2024 NWSL x Liga MX Femenil Summer Cup. This was the defender's only game for Kansas City, providing an assist in the 3–0 win before being substituted off in the 67th minute.

On 2 September 2024, the Kansas City Current announced that they had traded Glas to Seattle Reign FC in exchange for $10,000 in intra-league transfer funds, plus an additional $10,000 if certain performance criteria are achieved. She made her club debut on 17 September, starting a 2–0 defeat at the hands of NJ/NY Gotham FC. In November 2024, the Reign re-signed Glas to a one-year contract with a mutual option for 2026. She retired from professional football at the end of 2025.

== International career ==
In 2009, Glas played for Sweden's U-17 national team, and in 2010, suffered the first ACL injury of her career in a training session with the team. She later went on to play for Sweden's under-19 football team, and was an important part of the squad that won the 2012 UEFA Women's Under-19 Championship.

Glas was selected for the Swedish national team in 2015 to compete in UEFA Women's Euro 2017 qualifying after having had a strong club season in 2015, but her third ACL injury made it so she was unable to join the squad. On 19 January 2017, Glas finally made her debut in the national team in a 2–1 loss against Norway. In 2019, she was a part of Sweden's squad that finished third place in the 2019 FIFA Women's World Cup. In 2021, she was a starter in Sweden's 2020 Tokyo Olympics campaign where they won a silver medal. Glas missed the 2023 FIFA Women's World Cup due to injury.

On 15 October 2024, Glas announced her retirement from international football.

== Personal life ==
Glas was born in Sundsvall, Sweden to Susanne Glas and Leif Nilsson. She has a brother, Johan. In July 2023, she married her partner of over ten years, Christoffer Milde. They separated in 2024. In 2026, Glas announced that she was expecting her first child with her partner Carlos Jimenez.

== Career statistics ==
=== Club ===
As of 9 December 2025

Appearances and goals by club, season and competition
Club	Season	League			National cup (Note: Includes Svenska Cupen, DFB-Pokal Frauen, Trophée des Championnes, NWSL x Liga MX Femenil Summer Cup)		Continental (Note: Includes UEFA Champions League)		Total	
Club	Season	Division	Apps	Goals	Apps	Goals	Apps	Goals	Apps	Goals
Sundsvalls DFF	2011	Elitettan	16	0	3	1	—		19	1
Sundsvalls DFF	2012	Elitettan	20	2	—		—		20	2
Sundsvalls DFF	Total		36	2	3	1	0	0	39	3
Sunnanå SK	2013	Damallsvenskan	—		—		—		—	
Sunnanå SK	Total		0	0	0	0	0	0	0	0
Umeå IK	2013	Damallsvenskan	—		2	0	—		2	0
Umeå IK	2014	Damallsvenskan	16	1	4	1	—		20	2
Umeå IK	2015	Damallsvenskan	17	1	—		—		17	1
Umeå IK	2016	Damallsvenskan	10	0	—		—		10	0
Umeå IK	Total		43	2	6	1	0	0	49	3
Eskilstuna United DFF	2016	Damallsvenskan	—		1	0	—		1	0
Eskilstuna United DFF	2017	Damallsvenskan	22	0	5	0	—		27	0
Eskilstuna United DFF	2018	Damallsvenskan	16	1	—		—		16	1
Eskilstuna United DFF	Total		38	1	6	0	0	0	44	1
Paris Saint-Germain	2018-19	Première Ligue	14	1	—		3	0	17	1
Paris Saint-Germain	2019-20	Première Ligue	5	1	1	0	2	0	8	1
Paris Saint-Germain	Total		19	2	1	0	5	0	25	2
Bayern Munich	2019-20	Frauen-Bundesliga	—		—		1	0	1	0
Bayern Munich	2020-21	Frauen-Bundesliga	21	2	3	0	8	2	32	4
Bayern Munich	2021-22	Frauen-Bundesliga	19	4	3	0	8	0	30	4
Bayern Munich	2022-23	Frauen-Bundesliga	—		—		—		—	
Bayern Munich	Total		40	6	6	0	17	2	63	8
Kansas City Current	2023	NWSL	—		—		—		—	
Kansas City Current	2024	NWSL	1	0	1	0	—		2	0
Kansas City Current	Total		1	0	1	0	0	0	2	0
Seattle Reign FC	2024	NWSL	7	0	—		—		7	0
Seattle Reign FC	2025	NWSL	1	0	—		—		1	0
Seattle Reign FC	Total		8	0	0	0	0	0	8	0
Career Total			185	13	23	2	22	2	230	17

=== International ===
As of match played 12 July 2024

Appearances and goals by national team and year
National team	Year	Apps	Goals
Sweden	2017	7	0
Sweden	2018	9	0
Sweden	2019	17	0
Sweden	2020	6	0
Sweden	2021	12	0
Sweden	2022	7	1
Sweden	2023	0	0
Sweden	2024	1	0
Total		59	1

Scores and results list Sweden's goal tally first, score column indicates score after each Glas goal.

List of international goals scored by Hanna Glas
No.	Date	Venue	Opponent	Score	Result	Competition
1	20 February 2022	Estádio Algarve, Loulé, Portugal	Portugal	1–0	4–0	2022 Algarve Cup

== Honours ==
Bayern Munich

- Frauen-Bundesliga: 2020–21

Sweden U19

- UEFA Women's Under-19 Championship: 2012

Sweden

- Olympic silver medal: 2020
- Algarve Cup: 2018, 2022
