= Perle Morroni =

French footballer (born 1997)

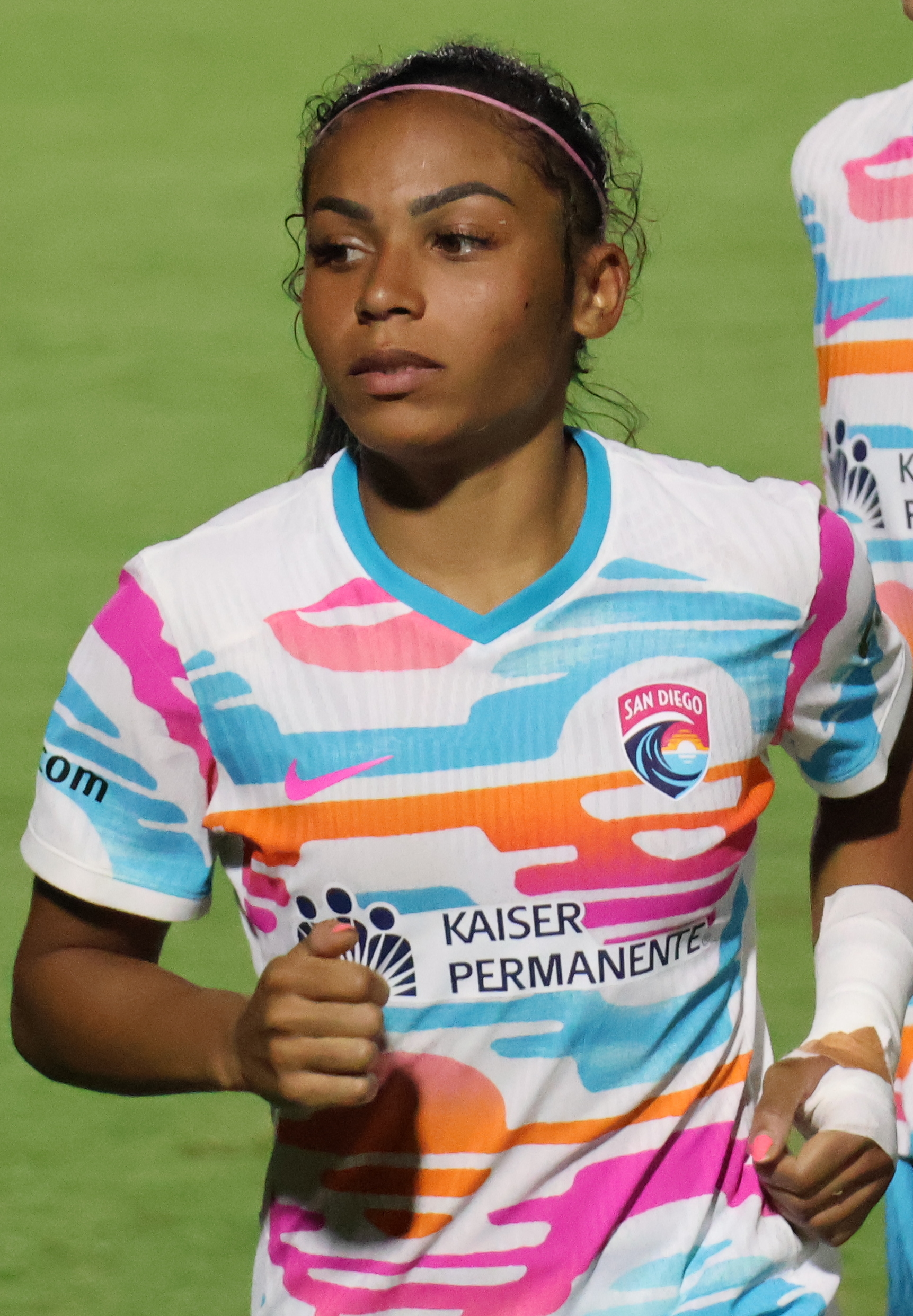
- Morroni with the San Diego Wave in 2024

Personal information
- Full name: Perle Morroni
- Date of birth: 15 October 1997 (age 29)
- Place of birth: Montpellier, France
- Height: 1.57 m (5 ft 2 in)
- Position: Left-back

Team information
- Current team: San Diego Wave
- Number: 75

Youth career
- 2006–2007: Montpellier
- 2007–2009: A.S. Lattoise
- 2009–2012: Montpellier
- 2012–2016: Paris Saint-Germain

Senior career*
Years	Team	Apps	(Gls)
2014–2021	Paris Saint-Germain	71	(4)
2018	→ Barcelona (loan)	4	(0)
2021–2024	Lyon	52	(1)
2024–	San Diego Wave	60	(1)

International career^{‡}
2013	France U16	3	(0)
2013	France U17	8	(1)
2016	France U19	10	(2)
2016	France U20	1	(0)
2017–2019	France U23	16	(0)
2020–	France	14	(2)
Medal record
Representing France
Women's football
UEFA Women's Nations League
Third place	2025
UEFA Women's Under-19 Championship
Winner	2016 Slovakia
- * Club domestic league appearances and goals as of 16:43, 15 November 2026 (UTC) ‡ National team caps and goals as of 3 March 2026

Perle Morroni (born 15 October 1997) is a French professional footballer who plays as a left-back for San Diego Wave FC of the National Women's Soccer League (NWSL) and the France national team. She previously played seven years with Paris Saint-Germain, including one on loan to Barcelona. Morroni has also played for Lyon, winning one UEFA Champions League with the club. She has represented France at multiple youth levels before making her senior team debut in 2020.

== Club career ==
=== Paris Saint-Germain ===
Morroni was born in Montpellier, France. She began playing football with Montpellier HSC before later joining A.S. Lattoise's boys' team. Originally a striker or attacking midfielder, she transitioned to full back in Paris Saint-Germain's youth academy. In 2015, she signed her first senior contract with PSG. She made her first-team debut for the club against Rodez at age 17. After playing in 3 matches in her first year as a professional, Morroni took advantage of an injury to Laure Boulleau and made twelve appearances in her second year, including both of PSG's Champions League semifinal matches. In 2017, Morroni played in the Champions League final, a penalty shootout defeat to French rivals Lyon.

During the start of the 2017–18 season, Morroni found herself struggling to earn minutes ahead of Ashley Lawrence and Laure Boulleau. On 10 January 2018, she joined Barcelona on loan until the end of the season in hopes of more playing time. Despite typical Barcelona left-back Leila Ouahabi largely out of the equation due to injury, Morroni did not end up featuring regularly. Nevertheless, she cemented herself permanently as a left-back during her loan spell with the Catalan club.

Morroni signed a two-year contract extension with PSG on 22 January 2019. At the end of the 2018–19 season, she was voted the best left-back in the Division 1 Feminine. In June 2020, PSG fans voted Morroni as the best left-back of the decade developed at the club. After spending seven years at Paris Saint-Germain, Morroni departed from PSG in 2021 in a quest to step out of her comfort zone.

=== Lyon ===
After leaving PSG as a free agent, Morroni signed a pre-contract agreement with German club Bayern Munich. However, after being approached by Lyon, Morroni changed courses and ended up signing a three-year contract with Lyon in July 2021. She entered the squad as a left-back replacement for Sakina Karchaoui, who countered Morroni's move by joining PSG.

During her time at Lyon, Morroni won the 2021–22 UEFA Women's Champions League with the club. She appeared in 52 games and scored 1 goal in her multi-year tenure at Lyon.

=== San Diego Wave ===
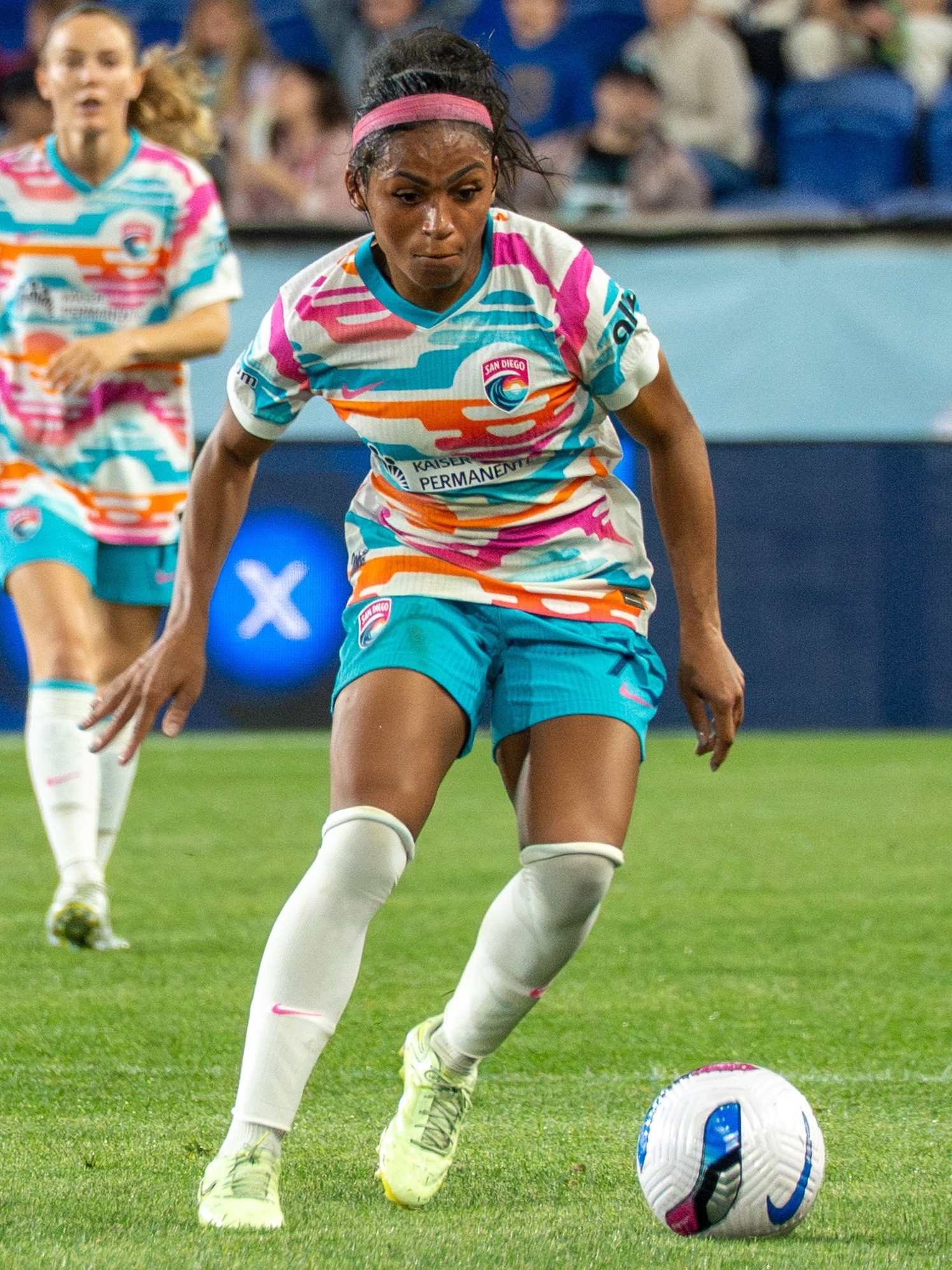
Morroni with the San Diego Wave in 2025

On 22 August 2024, National Women's Soccer League club San Diego Wave signed Morroni to a contract through the 2026 season. She made her debut for the club against Portland Thorns FC in the CONCACAF W Champions Cup on 18 September 2024. Three days later, Morroni made her first NWSL league appearance in a 1–0 defeat to the Chicago Red Stars. She would go on to play in 8 games across all competitions for San Diego in her first season with the Wave.

Morroni started the 2025 campaign on a positive note, leading the NWSL in successful one-on-one drives and leading San Diego in both blocks and tackles over the first 8 matches of the season. She registered her first NWSL assist on 19 April 2025, helping the ball to French teammate Delphine Cascarino in a victory over Racing Louisville FC. On 25 May, she scored her first goal for San Diego, opening the Wave's scoring in a 5–2 win over the North Carolina Courage; the victory set a club record for goals scored in a single game and also extended the team's unbeaten streak to six games. Morroni went on to appear in all but one of the Wave's 26 regular season matches, helping the club finish in sixth place and reach the NWSL playoffs. She played all 120 minutes of San Diego's first-round playoff defeat to the Portland Thorns.

On 14 August 2026, Morroni started a match against the Denver Summit to record her 50th NWSL appearance.

== International career ==
In 2013, Morroni participated in the UEFA Women's Under-17 Championship. She played in all three of France's group matches as they were eliminated in the group stage. Three years later, Morroni was part of the France U19s that won the 2016 UEFA Women's Under-19 Championship. She was also named in the team of the tournament.

Morroni was first called up to the senior French national team in June 2016; she was later called up in September 2017, but had to withdraw due to injury. She made her debut for the France national team on 7 March 2020 in a 1–0 win against Brazil. She scored her first international goal against Kazakhstan on 1 December 2020, scoring in the 67th minute. Morroni was a member of the French squad that participated in UEFA Women's Euro 2022 qualifying matches. However, she was not selected to the team that competed in the main tournament, with Sakina Karchaoui and Selma Bacha instead earning Corinne Diacre's nomination.

Leading up to the 2023 FIFA Women's World Cup, Kadidiatou Diani, Marie-Antoinette Katoto, and Wendie Renard withdrew from squad selection due to the conditions under current management. Morroni, who had not received a call-up from Diacre in almost a year, also withdrew from selection and spoke out about her decision on social media.

In November 2025, Morroni was included in the France squad for two UEFA Women's Nations League matches against Sweden, her first call-up to the national team in four years.

== Personal life ==
Born in France, Morroni is of Ivorian descent. She is close friends with her teammate Delphine Cascarino.

== Career statistics ==
=== Club ===
As of 11 November 2025

Club	Season	League			Cup (Note: Includes the Coupe de France Féminine and the NWSL Challenge Cup)		Continental (Note: Includes the UEFA Women's Champions League and CONCACAF W Champions Cup)		Other		Total	
Club	Season	Division	Apps	Goals	Apps	Goals	Apps	Goals	Apps	Goals	Apps	Goals
Paris Saint-Germain	2014–15	Division 1 Féminine	3	0	0	0	0	0	—		3	0
Paris Saint-Germain	2015–16	Division 1 Féminine	7	2	1	0	4	0	—		12	2
Paris Saint-Germain	2016–17	Division 1 Féminine	13	1	4	1	3	0	—		20	2
Paris Saint-Germain	2017–18	Division 1 Féminine	1	0	0	0	—		—		1	0
Paris Saint-Germain	2018–19	Division 1 Féminine	18	0	2	0	3	0	—		23	0
Paris Saint-Germain	2019–20	Division 1 Féminine	12	0	4	0	4	0	1 (Note: Includes the Trophée des Championnes)	0	21	0
Paris Saint-Germain	2020–21	Division 1 Féminine	17	1	1	0	6	0	—		24	1
Paris Saint-Germain	Total		71	4	12	1	20	0	1	0	104	5
Barcelona (loan)	2017–18	Primera División	4	0	0	0	1	0	—		5	0
Lyon	2021–22	Division 1 Féminine	16	1	1	0	10	1	—		27	2
Lyon	2022–23	Division 1 Féminine	19	0	4	0	7	0	1	0	31	0
Lyon	2023–24	Division 1 Féminine	17	0	0	0	7	0	1	0	25	0
Lyon	Total		52	1	5	0	24	1	2	0	83	2
San Diego Wave FC	2024	NWSL	6	0	0	0	2	0	0	0	8	0
San Diego Wave FC	2025	NWSL	25	1	—		—		1 (Note: Appearances in the NWSL playoffs)	0	26	1
San Diego Wave FC	Total		31	1	0	0	2	0	1	0	34	1
Career total			158	6	17	1	47	1	4	0	226	8

=== International ===
As of match played 3 March 2026

Appearances and goals by national team and year
National team	Year	Apps	Goals
France	2020	5	1
France	2021	6	1
France	2022	0	0
France	2025	2	0
France	2026	1	0
Total		14	2

Scores and results list France's goal tally first, score column indicates score after each Morroni goal.

List of international goals scored by Perle Morroni
No.	Date	Venue	Opponent	Score	Result	Competition
1	1 December 2020	Stade de la Rabine, Vannes, France	Kazakhstan	10–0	12–0	2022 UEFA Women's Euro qualification
2	20 February 2021	Stade Saint-Symphorien, Metz, France	Switzerland	2–0	2–0	Friendly

== Honours ==
Paris Saint-Germain

- Division 1 Féminine: 2020–21
- Coupe de France: 2017–18
- UEFA Women's Champions League runner-up: 2014–15, 2016–17

Lyon

- Division 1 Féminine: 2021–22, 2022–23, 2023–24
- Coupe de France: 2022–23
- Trophée des Championnes: 2022, 2023
- UEFA Women's Champions League: 2021–22

France U19

- UEFA Women's Under-19 Championship: 2016

Individual

- UEFA Women's Under-19 Championship team of the tournament: 2016
