= Charlotte Voll =

German footballer (born 1999)

Personal information
- Full name: Charlotte Louise Voll
- Date of birth: 22 April 1999 (age 27)
- Place of birth: Karlsruhe, Germany
- Height: 1.78 m (5 ft 10 in)
- Position: Goalkeeper

Team information
- Current team: Bayer Leverkusen
- Number: 1

Youth career
- 1899 Hoffenheim

Senior career*
Years	Team	Apps	(Gls)
2015–2017	1899 Hoffenheim II	7	(0)
2017–2019	Paris Saint-Germain	0	(0)
2019–2020	SC Sand	8	(0)
2020–2022	Paris Saint-Germain	6	(0)
2022–2023	SCR Altach/FFC Vorderland	17	(0)
2023–	Bayer Leverkusen	5	(0)
- * Club domestic league appearances and goals as of 4 October 2026

Charlotte Louise Voll (born 22 April 1999) is a German professional footballer who plays as a goalkeeper for Frauen-Bundesliga club Bayer Leverkusen.

== Club career ==
A youth academy graduate of 1899 Hoffenheim, Voll made her debut for the club's reserve side in 2. Frauen-Bundesliga on 31 October 2015. Even though she didn't play any match for the senior side, she appeared in six more matches for the reserve side before leaving the club in 2017.

On 19 July 2017, French Division 1 Féminine club Paris Saint-Germain announced the signing of Voll on a two-year deal. With Katarzyna Kiedrzynek and Christiane Endler ahead of her in the pecking order of the senior team, she spent most of her time with club's youth side in Challenge National Féminin U19. Upon the expiration of contract in May 2019, she left the club without playing any official matches for the senior team.

On 21 May 2019, Frauen-Bundesliga club SC Sand announced the signing of Voll on a two-year deal. She made her professional debut on 13 October 2019, keeping a clean sheet in 3–0 league win against FFC Frankfurt. In July 2020, she returned to Paris Saint-Germain by signing a two-year contract.

On 7 August 2023, Voll joined German club Bayer Leverkusen. She made her competitive debut for the club on 10 September 2023 in a 3–0 cup win over SV Meppen. On 2 May 2025, she signed a contract extension with the club until June 2027.

== International career ==
Voll was part of the Germany under-20 team which reached quarter-finals of the 2018 FIFA U-20 Women's World Cup.

== Honours ==
Paris Saint-Germain

- Division 1 Féminine: 2020–21
- Coupe de France Féminine: 2021–22
