= Daiane Limeira =

Brazilian footballer (born 1997)

Daiane
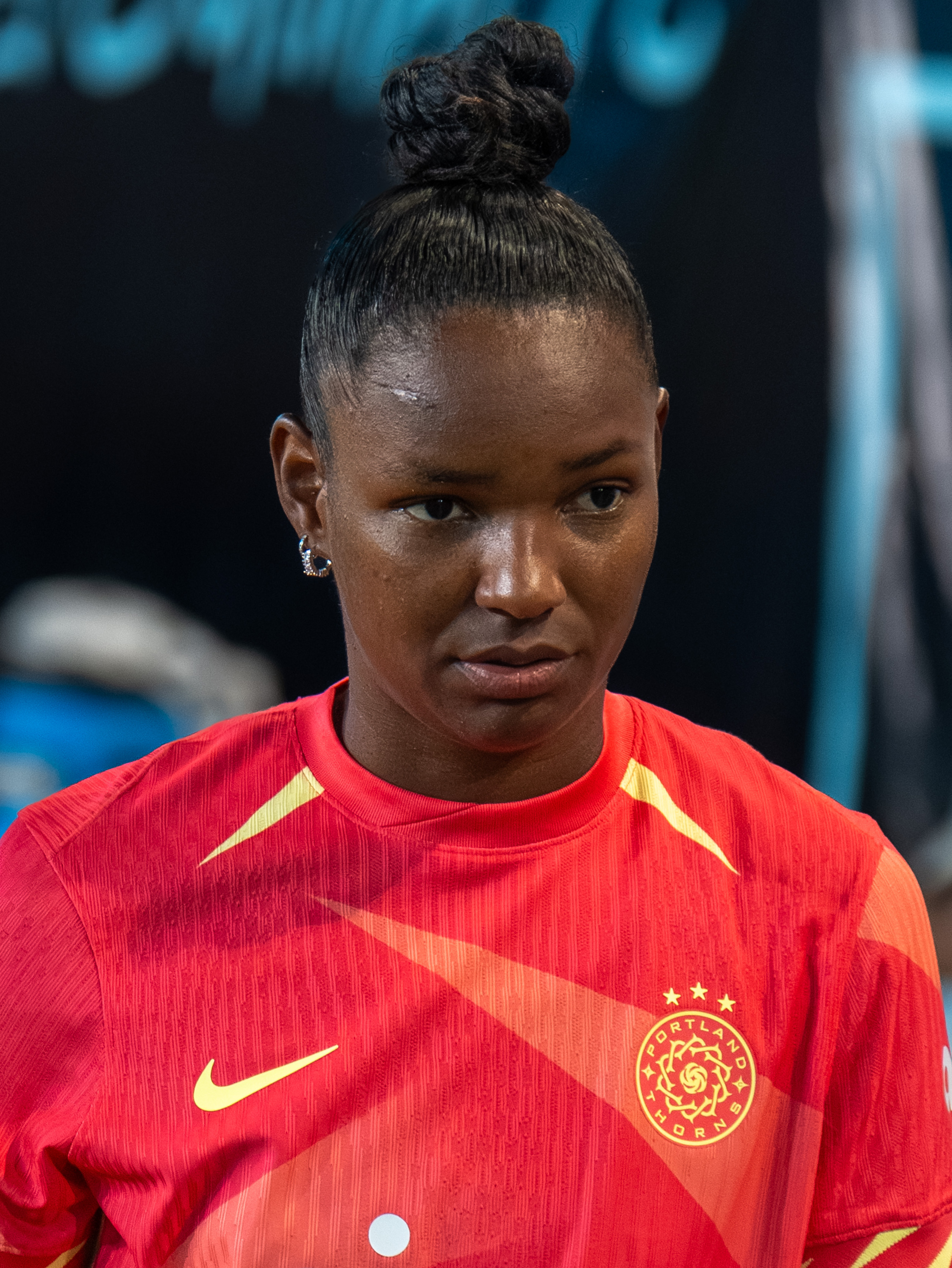
- Daiane with Portland Thorns FC in 2025

Personal information
- Full name: Daiane Limeira Santos Silva
- Date of birth: 7 September 1997 (age 29)
- Place of birth: Uberlândia, Minas Gerais, Brazil
- Height: 1.79 m (5 ft 10 in)
- Position: Defender

Team information
- Current team: Monterrey
- Number: 3

Senior career*
Years	Team	Apps	(Gls)
2013	Kindermann		
2014	Joinville Esporte Clube		
2015	XV de Piracicaba		
2015	Tiradentes		
2016	Rio Preto		
2017–2018	Avaldsnes IL	29	(3)
2018–2019	Paris Saint-Germain	9	(0)
2019–2020	CD Tacón	16	(0)
2020–2021	Real Madrid	0	(0)
2021–2022	Madrid CFF	14	(0)
2022–2024	Flamengo	4	(1)
2025–2026	Portland Thorns	9	(0)
2026	→ Monterrey (loan)	11	(0)
2026–	Monterrey	0	(0)

International career^{‡}
2015–2016	Brazil U-20	2	(0)
2018–	Brazil	15	(0)
- * Club domestic league appearances and goals as of 23:45, 1 February 2026 (UTC) ‡ National team caps and goals as of 23:10, 24 November 2022 (UTC)

Daiane Limeira Santos Silva (born 7 September 1997), commonly known as Daiane Limeira or simply Daiane, is a Brazilian professional footballer who plays as a defender for Liga MX Femenil club Monterrey and the Brazil national team.

== Club career ==
Daiane began her formal football training at Clube de Regatas do Flamengo's soccer school in Uberlândia. At 16 years old she had a successful trial with Associação Desportiva Centro Olímpico, but was unable to raise enough funds to relocate to São Paulo and take up her place. Instead she tried out with Kindermann's under-17 team, where she impressed enough to be brought straight into the adult first team.

During 2014 Daiane played futsal for Associação Desportiva 3R's under-17 team and for Joinville at the Joguinhos Abertos de Santa Catarina (transl. Open Games of Santa Catarina). In 2015 she played football for both XV de Piracicaba and Tiradentes, before spending 2016 with Rio Preto. At XV de Piracicaba she was switched from playing on the wing to central defence. She proved a revelation in her new position and was soon attracting notice from scouts. In her season at Rio Preto the team won the Campeonato Paulista and were runners-up in the Campeonato Brasileiro.

She agreed a transfer to Norwegian Toppserien club Avaldsnes for their 2017 season, which culminated in them winning the Norwegian Women's Cup for the first time. In August 2018, Paris Saint-Germain of the Division 1 Féminine signed Daiane to a three-year contract. In August 2019, Daiane joined CD Tacón in the Primera División. Tacón became Real Madrid in 2020–21, but Daiane's career was interrupted by three knee surgeries. She joined Madrid CFF for 2021–22. In June 2022 she returned to Brazilian football with Flamengo.

On 13 December 2024, NWSL club Portland Thorns FC announced the signing of Daiane to a two-year contract, paying an undisclosed transfer fee to Flamengo. She made 7 regular season appearances and two playoff appearances in her first season in Portland. In January 2026, the Thorns announced that Daiane had been loaned out to Mexican club Monterrey through 16 July 2026. Following the expiration of her loan, Daiane joined Monterrey on a permanent transfer in June 2026.

== International career ==
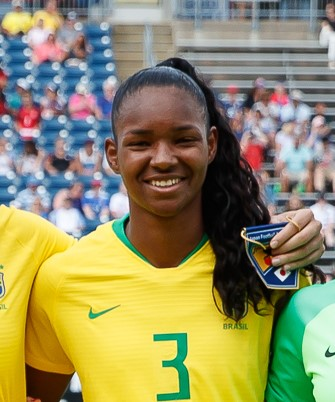
Daiane with Brazil in 2018

Daiane was called up in the Brazil u20 selection for its debut in August 2015. She played well at the 2016 FIFA U-20 Women's World Cup in Papua New Guinea, being named player of the match in Brazil's 1–1 draw with Sweden.

In January 2018, national team coach Vadão included Daiane in her debut in the Brazil women's national football team. She made her international debut on 13 March 2018 for the 2018 Copa América Femenina defeating Bolivia, 7–0.

. Brazil remained undefeated and won the tournament, securing qualification for the 2019 FIFA Women's World Cup in France. Daiane retained her place in the squad for the 2018 Tournament of Nations in July and August 2018.

Daiane was not included in Brazil's initial squad for the 2019 FIFA Women's World Cup, but was a late call-up when Érika withdrew with a calf injury.

== Personal life ==
Daiane is from a large family, variously reported as being among 18 or 23 siblings. When she turned professional she began sending money to her family in Uberlândia, explaining that her priority was helping her parents to buy their own house.
