= Katarzyna Kiedrzynek =

Polish footballer (born 1991)

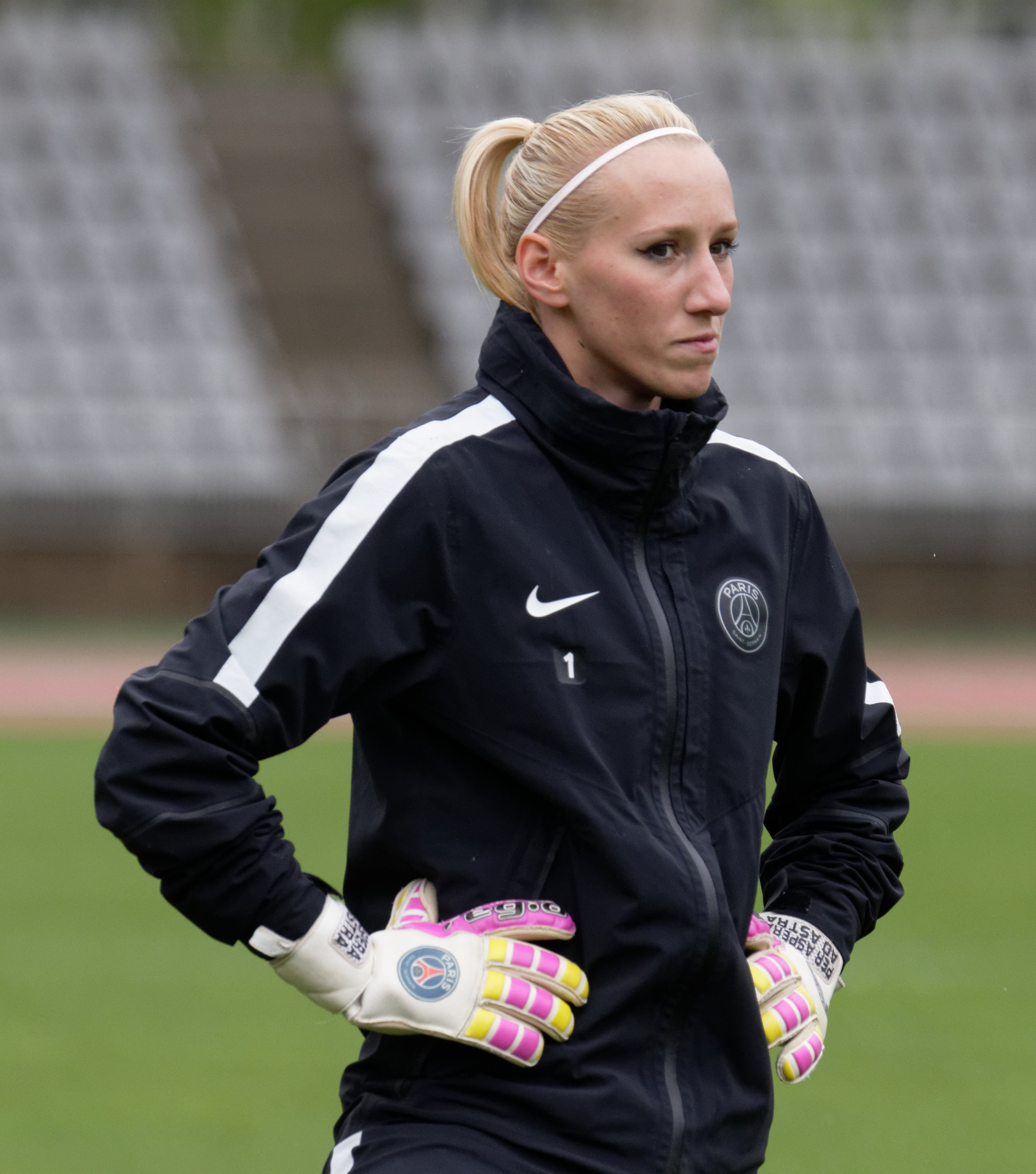
- Kiedrzynek with Paris Saint-Germain in 2015

Personal information
- Date of birth: 19 March 1991 (age 35)
- Place of birth: Lublin, Poland
- Height: 1.80 m (5 ft 11 in)
- Position: Goalkeeper

Team information
- Current team: Paris Saint-Germain
- Number: 1

Youth career
- 2004–2007: Motor Lublin

Senior career*
Years	Team	Apps	(Gls)
2007–2013	Górnik Łęczna		
2013–2020	Paris Saint-Germain	84	(0)
2020–2023	VfL Wolfsburg	19	(0)
2022–2023	VfL Wolfsburg II	2	(0)
2023–	Paris Saint-Germain	17	(0)

International career
2009–2024	Poland	64	(0)
- * Club domestic league appearances and goals as of 14 November 2026

Katarzyna Kiedrzynek (IPA: [kataˈʐɨna kʲɛdˈʐɨnɛk]; born 19 March 1991) is a Polish professional footballer who plays as a goalkeeper for Première Ligue club Paris Saint-Germain. She had a 15-year international career with the Poland national team.

== Club career ==
As a teenager, Katarzyna Kiedrzynek played handball and football, as a striker at first, then a goalkeeper. After the two sports could no longer be reconciled in terms of time, she decided to play football. From 2010 to the summer of 2013, she appeared for Górnik Łęczna in the Polish Ekstraliga. During this time, Kiedrzynek also became a national team player. For the 2013–14 season, she moved to the French first division club Paris Saint-Germain. Her coach Farid Benstiti had already become aware of her during his time as the Russian national coach during an international match against Poland. Her debut in the Ligaelf took place at the beginning of the second half of the season in December 2013 with a 9–0 win at bottom AS Muret. With Paris, she finished in 2014 – at that time in the hierarchy of goalkeepers only in third place – and 2015 behind Olympique Lyon in second place in Division 1 Féminine. In May 2014, she was in the starting line-up for the French Cup final. She became the undisputed number one goalkeeper at PSG in her second season after beating Karima Benameur and the newly signed Ann-Katrin Berger. In the 2014–15 season, Kiedrzynek played in all nine Champions League games for the Parisians.

Benstiti saw her qualities above all in the fact that she is willing to constantly work on herself, and also praises her "air superiority" in the penalty area and her handling of the ball with her feet. Kiedrzynek remained the first choice even under Benstiti's successors Patrice Lair and Olivier Echouafni, although she had a strong new competitor, Christiane Endler, since 2017. In the 2019–20 season, the coach mostly gave preference to Endler in league games. In the summer of 2020, Kiedrzynek therefore joined VfL Wolfsburg, with a contract of three years. At the start of the Bundesliga, she was in goal for Wolfsburg in a 3–0 win against SGS Essen.

== International career ==
Kiedrzynek had been part of the Poland national team from 2009 to 2024. She made her debut on 19 September 2009 in a 4–1 win against Ukraine. She announced her retirement from the national team on 9 May 2024.

== Career statistics ==
=== International ===
Appearances and goals by national team and year
National team	Year	Apps	Goals
Poland	2009	2	0
Poland	2010	3	0
Poland	2011	5	0
Poland	2012	7	0
Poland	2013	6	0
Poland	2014	5	0
Poland	2016	2	0
Poland	2017	7	0
Poland	2018	8	0
Poland	2019	5	0
Poland	2020	5	0
Poland	2021	2	0
Poland	2022	2	0
Poland	2023	3	0
Poland	2024	2	0
Total		64	0

== Honours ==
Paris Saint-Germain

- Coupe de France Féminine: 2017–18, 2023–24
- UEFA Women's Champions League runner-up: 2014–15, 2016–17

VfL Wolfsburg

- Frauen-Bundesliga: 2021–22
- DFB-Pokal: 2020–21, 2021–22, 2022–23
- UEFA Women's Champions League runner-up: 2022–23

Individual

- Polish Footballer of the Year: 2015, 2016, 2017
- LFFP Première Ligue best goalkeeper: 2015–16, 2016–17
- LFFP Première Ligue team of the season: 2015–16, 2016–17, 2018–19
