= Melike Pekel =

German-born Turkish footballer

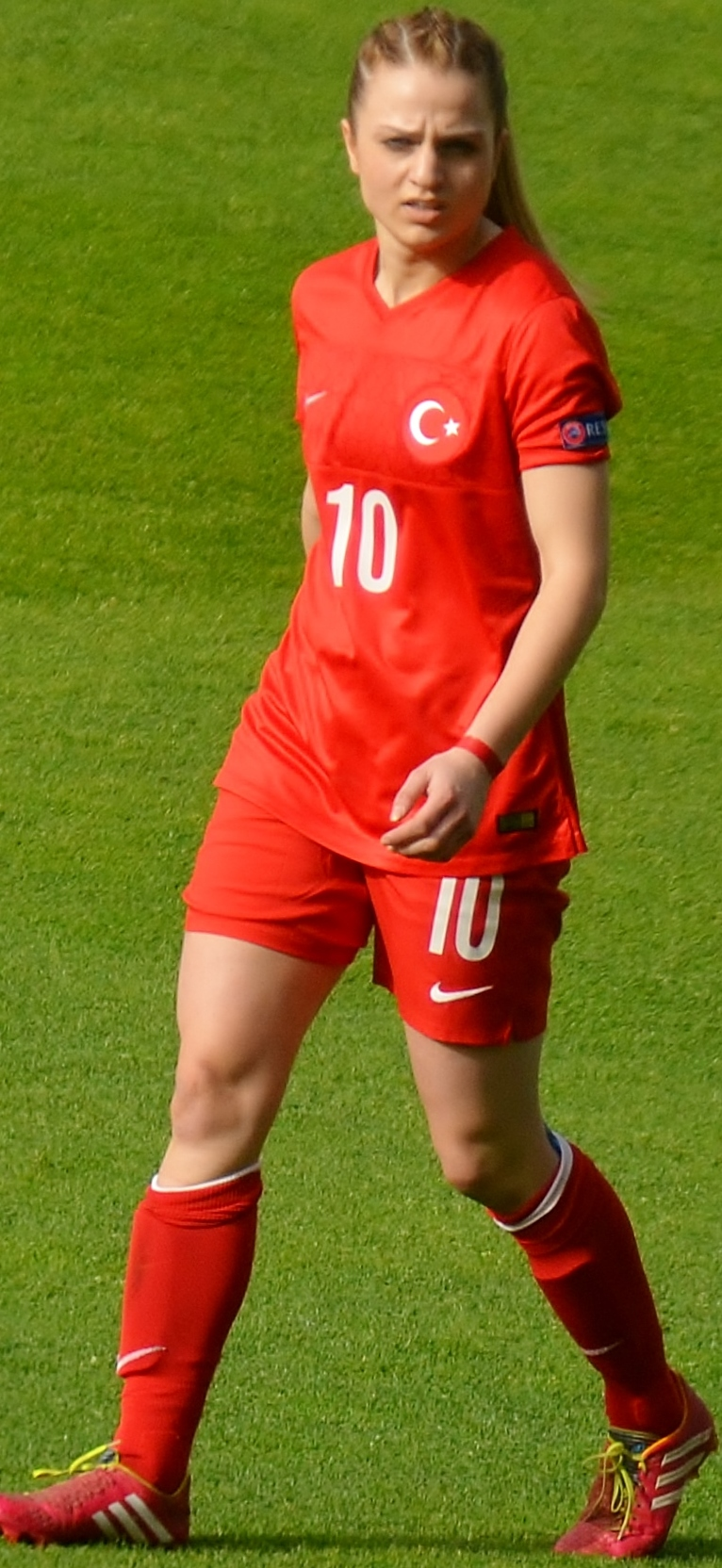
- Pekel with Turkey in 2016

Personal information
- Date of birth: 14 April 1995 (age 31)
- Place of birth: Munich, Germany
- Height: 1.72 m (5 ft 8 in)
- Position: Forward

Team information
- Current team: Galatasaray
- Number: 10

Youth career
- FC Schrobenhausen

Senior career*
Years	Team	Apps	(Gls)
2012–2014	TSV Schwaben Augsburg II	1	(0)
2012–2014	TSV Schwaben Augsburg	39	(20)
2014–2016	Bayern München II	43	(22)
2014–2016	Bayern München	1	(0)
2017	Metz	12	(5)
2017–2019	Paris Saint-Germain	14	(0)
2019	→ Bordeaux (loan)	5	(0)
2019–2020	Metz	8	(0)
2020–2021	Le Havre	10	(0)
2021	Reims	5	(0)
2023–2024	Ingolstadt	13	(1)
2024–2025	SKN St. Pölten	14	(6)
2025–	Galatasaray	8	(4)

International career^{‡}
2015–	Turkey	34	(7)
- * Club domestic league appearances and goals as of 26 May 2024 ‡ National team caps and goals as of 3 June 2025

Melike Pekel (born 14 April 1995) is a German-born Turkish footballer who plays as a forward for the Turkey women's national team.

== Early life ==
Melike Pekel was born to Turkish immigrant parents in München, Germany on 14 April 1995. After completing her vocational education in July 2015, she started to work as an optician in Schrobenhausen, Upper Bavaria, where she resides.

== Club career ==
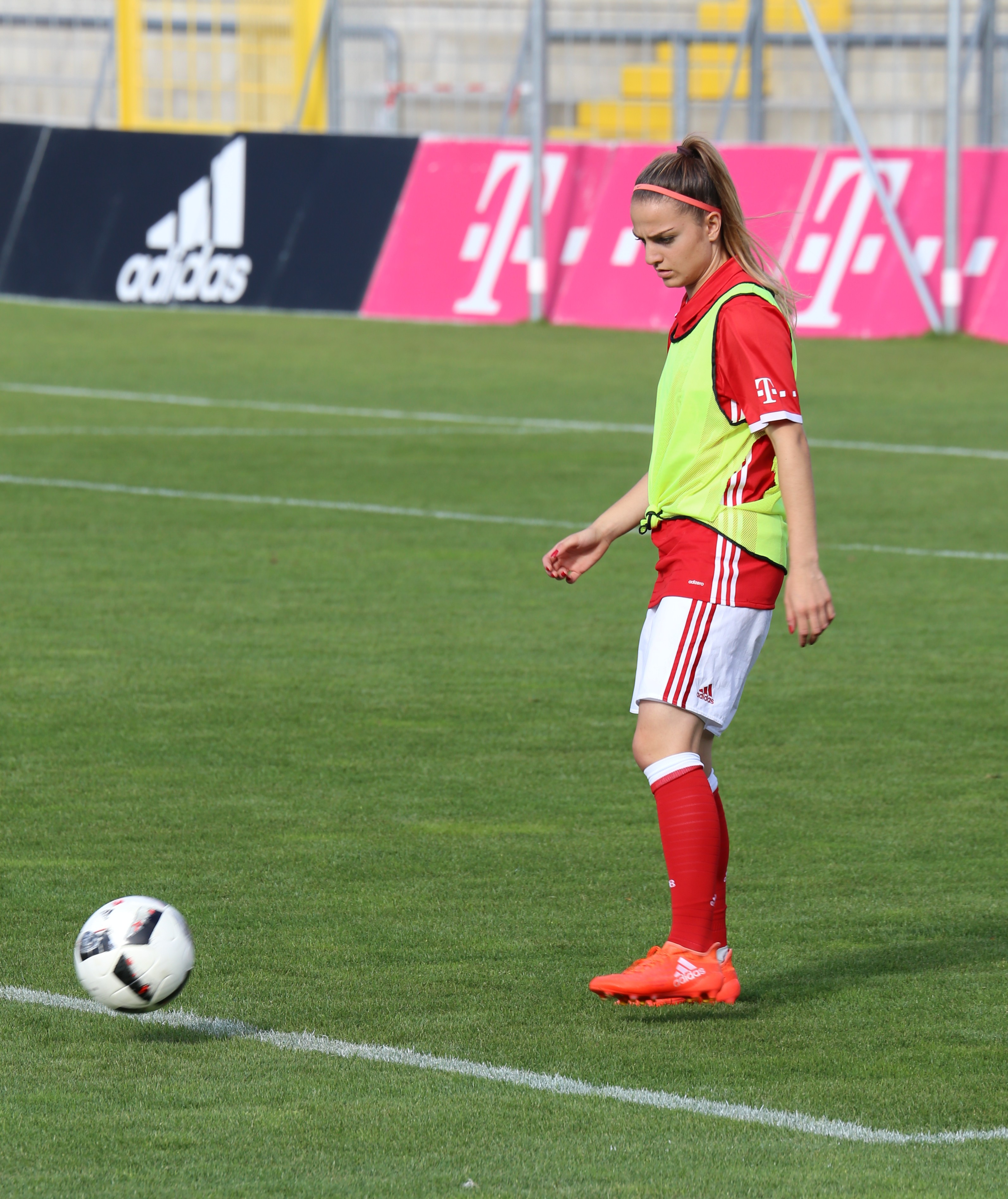
Melike Pekel of FC Bayern München, in the warm-up.

Pekel began her career in the youth team of FC Schrobenhausen in her hometown, and displayed her high footballer talent. In the 2012–13 season, she started to play for the second team of TSV Schwaben Augsburg in the German Bezirksoberliga Schwaben. Already after one game in the same season, she was promoted to the first squad of the club, which competed in the Regionalliga Süd. She scored in total 20 goals in 40 matches in two league seasons. Pekel became the topscorer of the Regionalliga Süd in the 2013–14 season.

For the 2014–15 season, FC Bayern München transferred her in the second team of the club to play in the 2. Bundesliga Frauen Süd. In the 12th play day of the season on 7 December 2014, manager Thomas Wörle took her into the first squad in the Bundesliga Frauen match against 1. FFC Frankfurt. She appeared in two games for the first squad until the end of the season. She enjoyed her team's champion title in the 2014–15 Bundesliga season. In the 2015–16 season, Pekel returned to her place in the second squad of the club playing in the 2. Frauen-Bundesliga Süd again. As of 22 November 2015, she scored 15 goals in 26 games for her club.

At the beginning of 2017, she left Munich and transferred to FC Metz-Algrange to play in the Division 1 Féminine. She made her debut in the away game against ASPTT Albi on 5 February 2017. Pekel scored her first and her team's only goal in the third minute in the home match against Olympique de Marseille on 26 February 2017.

Ahead of the 2017–2018 season Pekel joined Paris Saint-Germain. With her playing time limited, Pekel went on loan to Bordeaux in 2019. In August 2019, Pekel re-signed with Metz.

She later joined fellow French clubs Le Havre and Reims, in which she sustained recurring knee injuries and eventually left the latter in 2021.

=== Ingolstadt ===
In November 2023, following a two-year hiatus, she joined 2. Bundesliga club Ingolstadt for the 2023–24 season. On 21 April 2024, she scored her first goal for Ingolstadt in a 2–1 away defeat against FSV Gütersloh 2009.

=== Galatasaray ===
On July 8, 2025, she signed a contract with the Turkish giant Galatasaray.

== International career ==
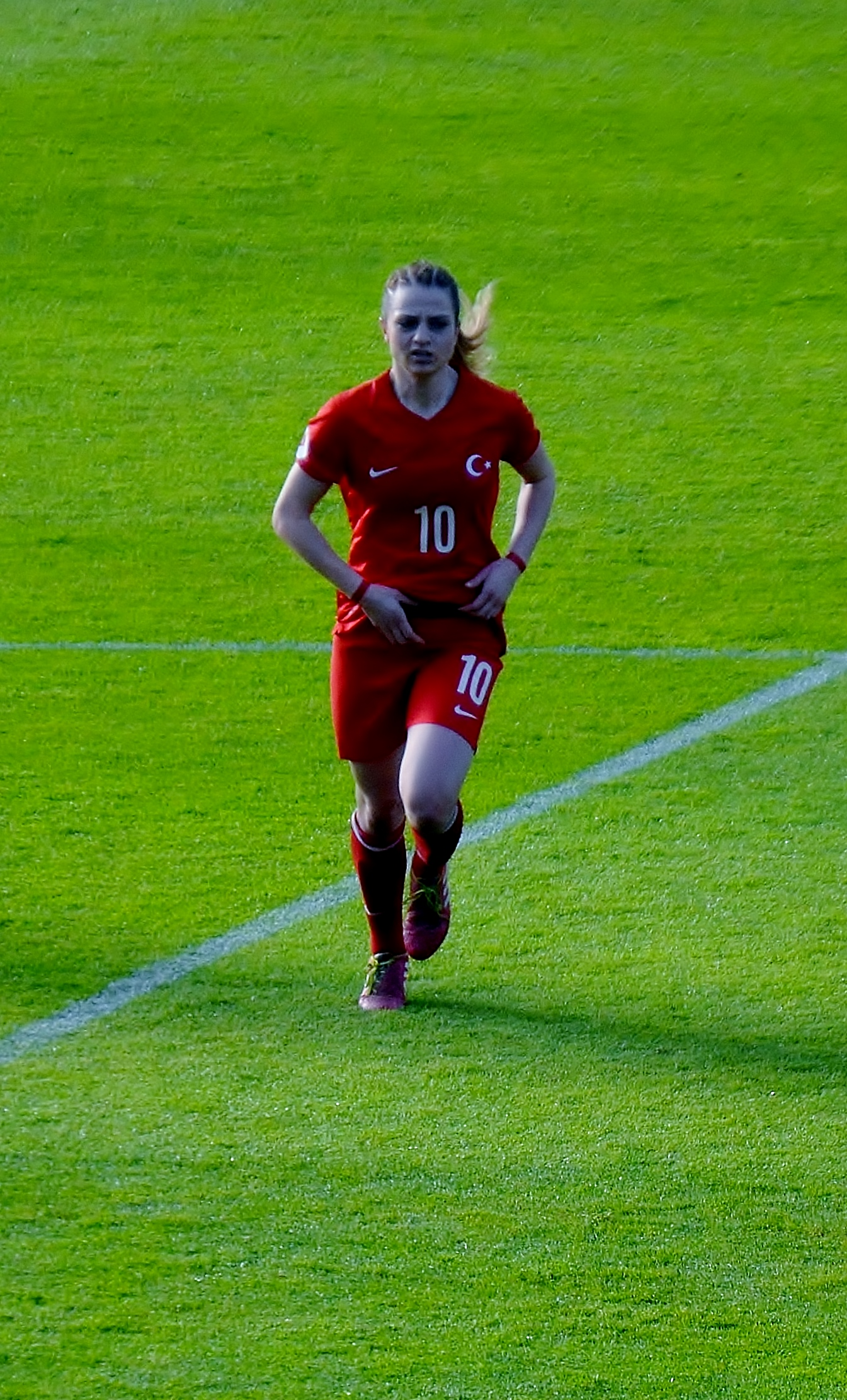
Melike Pekel playing for Turkey national team.

Pekel was called up to the Turkey women's national team, and debuted in the friendly match against Albania on 19 August 2015.

She took part in four of the UEFA Women's Euro 2017 qualifying Group 5 matches for the Turkish nationals. She appeared in three matches of the UEFA Women's Euro 2017 qualifying Group 5. On 1 March 2017, Pekel scored her first national goal against Romania in the 2017 Goldcity Women's Cup.

She took part at the 2019 FIFA Women's World Cup qualification – UEFA preliminary round – Group 4 matches. In the second match of the tournament, she scored a hat-trick in the match against Luxembourg on 8 April 2017. She scored her team's only goal in the third game of the qualification tournament against Faroe Islands.

== Career statistics ==
=== Club ===
As of match played 20 July 2017

Appearances and goals by club, season and competition
Club	Season	League			Continental		National		Total	
Club	Season	Division	Apps	Goals	Apps	Goals	Apps	Goals	Apps	Goals
TSV Schwaben Augsburg	2012–13	Bezirksoberliga Schwaben	1	0	–	–	–	–	1	0
TSV Schwaben Augsburg	2012–13	Regionalliga Süd	19	4	–	–	–	–	19	4
TSV Schwaben Augsburg	2013–14	Regionalliga Süd	20	16	–	–	–	–	20	16
TSV Schwaben Augsburg	Total		40	20	–	–	–	–	40	20
Bayern Munich	2014–15	2. Bundesliga Frauen Süd	17	12	–	–	–	–	17	12
Bayern Munich	2014–15	Frauen-Bundesliga	2	0	–	–	–	–	2	0
Bayern Munich	2015–16	2. Bundesliga Frauen Süd	16	7	–	–	9	0	25	7
Bayern Munich	2016–17	2. Bundesliga Frauen Süd	8	3	–	–	0	0	8	3
Bayern Munich	2016–17	Frauen-Bundesliga	1	0	–	–	0	0	1	0
Bayern Munich	Total		44	22	–	–	9	0	53	22
FC Metz-Algrange	2016–17	Division 1 Féminine	12	5	–	–	6	6	18	11
Paris Saint-Germain	2017–18	Division 1 Féminine	14	0	–	–	0	0	14	0
Career total			110	47	–	–	15	6	125	53

=== International ===
International goals (Friendly matches not included)
Date	Venue	Opponent	Competition	Result	Scored
Turkey women's national team
8 April 2017	Tórshavn, Faroe Islands	Luxembourg	2019 FIFA World Cup qualification – UEFA preliminary round – Group 4	W 9–1	3,
11 April 2017	Tórshavn, Faroe Islands	Faroe Islands	2019 FIFA World Cup qualification – UEFA preliminary round – Group 4	L 1–2	1,

== Honours ==
Frauen-Bundesliga

FC Bayern München
Winners (1): 2014–15.

Individual

- Top Scorer: 2013–14 – Regionalliga Süd with TSV Schwaben Augsburg (16 goals)
