= Paulina Dudek =

Polish footballer (born 1997)

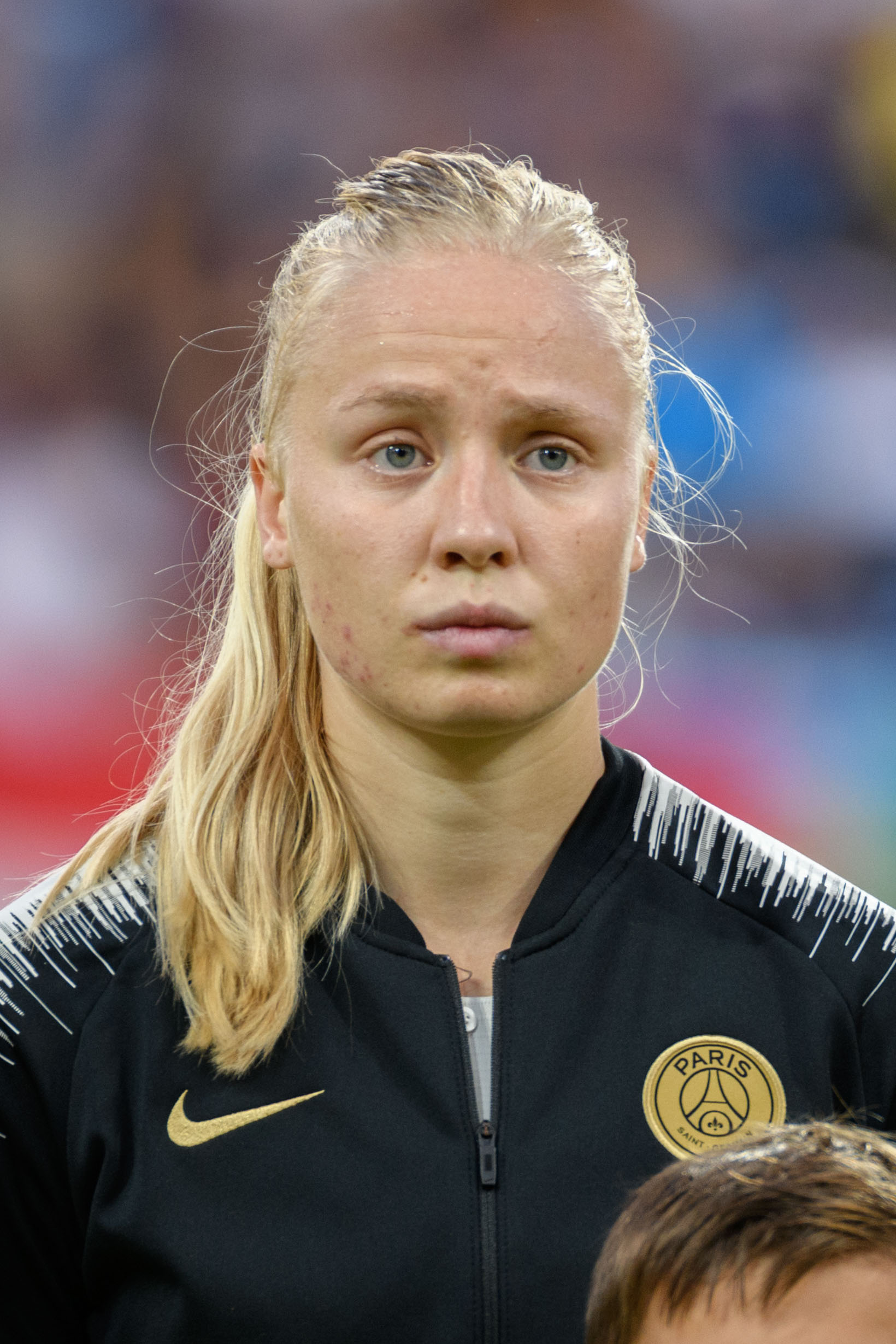
- Dudek with Paris Saint-Germain in 2018

Personal information
- Date of birth: 16 June 1997 (age 29)
- Place of birth: Gorzów Wielkopolski, Poland
- Height: 1.69 m (5 ft 7 in)
- Position: Centre-back

Team information
- Current team: Paris Saint-Germain
- Number: 4

Youth career
- Polonia Słubice
- Stilon Gorzów

Senior career*
Years	Team	Apps	(Gls)
2013–2014	Stilon Gorzów	10	(3)
2014–2018	Medyk Konin	69	(34)
2018–	Paris Saint-Germain	103	(9)

International career^{‡}
2012–2013	Poland U17	11	(6)
2014–2016	Poland U19	5	(0)
2014–	Poland	68	(7)
Medal record
Representing Poland
Women's football
UEFA Women's Under-17 Championship
Winner	2013 Switzerland
- * Club domestic league appearances and goals as of 21 November 2026 ‡ National team caps and goals as of 19:10, 13 October 2026 (UTC)

Paulina Dudek (born 16 June 1997) is a Polish professional footballer who plays as a centre-back for Première Ligue club Paris Saint-Germain and the Poland national team.

== Club career ==
Dudek is a youth academy graduate of Stilon Gorzów Wielkopolski. She joined Medyk Konin prior to the 2014–15 season and went on to win three consecutive Ekstraliga titles with the club. On 7 May 2017, she scored her first hat-trick in a 5–0 league win against AZS PWSZ Wałbrzych. In January 2018, she joined French club Paris Saint-Germain.

== International career ==
Dudek captained Poland under-17 team to victory at the 2013 UEFA Women's Under-17 Championship. She has also been capped by Poland national team, with appearances during 2019 FIFA Women's World Cup qualifiers. In June 2025, she was named in the squad for the UEFA Women's Euro 2025.

== Career statistics ==
=== International ===
As of match played 13 October 2026

Appearances and goals by national team and year
National team	Year	Apps	Goals
Poland	2014	7	0
Poland	2015	2	0
Poland	2016	5	0
Poland	2017	8	2
Poland	2018	5	0
Poland	2019	3	1
Poland	2020	6	1
Poland	2021	8	1
Poland	2022	6	2
Poland	2024	3	0
Poland	2025	8	0
Poland	2026	7	0
Total		68	7

Scores and results list Poland's goal tally first, score column indicates score after each Dudek goal.

List of international goals scored by Paulina Dudek
No.	Date	Venue	Opponent	Score	Result	Competition
1	12 June 2017	Stadion Miejski, Łomża, Poland	Lithuania	2–0	5–0	Friendly
2	23 October 2017	Municipal Stadium, Ostróda, Poland	Greece	1–0	3–0	Friendly
3	1 March 2019	Lagos Municipal Stadium, Lagos, Portugal	Spain	1–0	3–0	2019 Algarve Cup
4	27 October 2020	Zimbru Stadium, Chișinău, Moldova	Moldova	1–0	3–0	UEFA Women's Euro 2022 qualification
5	26 October 2021	Stadion Miejski, Tychy, Poland	Albania	1–0	2–0	2023 FIFA Women's World Cup qualification
6	16 February 2022	La Manga Club Football Stadium, La Manga, Spain	Republic of Ireland	1–0	1–2	2022 Pinatar Cup
7	6 September 2022	Arena Lublin, Lublin, Poland	Kosovo	1–0	7–0	2023 FIFA Women's World Cup qualification

== Honours ==
Medyk Konin

- Ekstraliga: 2014–15, 2015–16, 2016–17
- Polish Cup: 2014–15, 2015–16, 2016–17

Paris Saint-Germain

- Première Ligue: 2020–21
- Coupe de France Féminine: 2017–18 2021–22, 2023–24

Poland U17

- UEFA Women's Under-17 Championship: 2013

Individual

- Polish Footballer of the Year: 2020, 2021
- UNFP Première Ligue Team of the Year: 2021–22
- LFFP Première Ligue Team of the Season: 2021–22
