= Olivier Echouafni =

French football manager (born 1972)

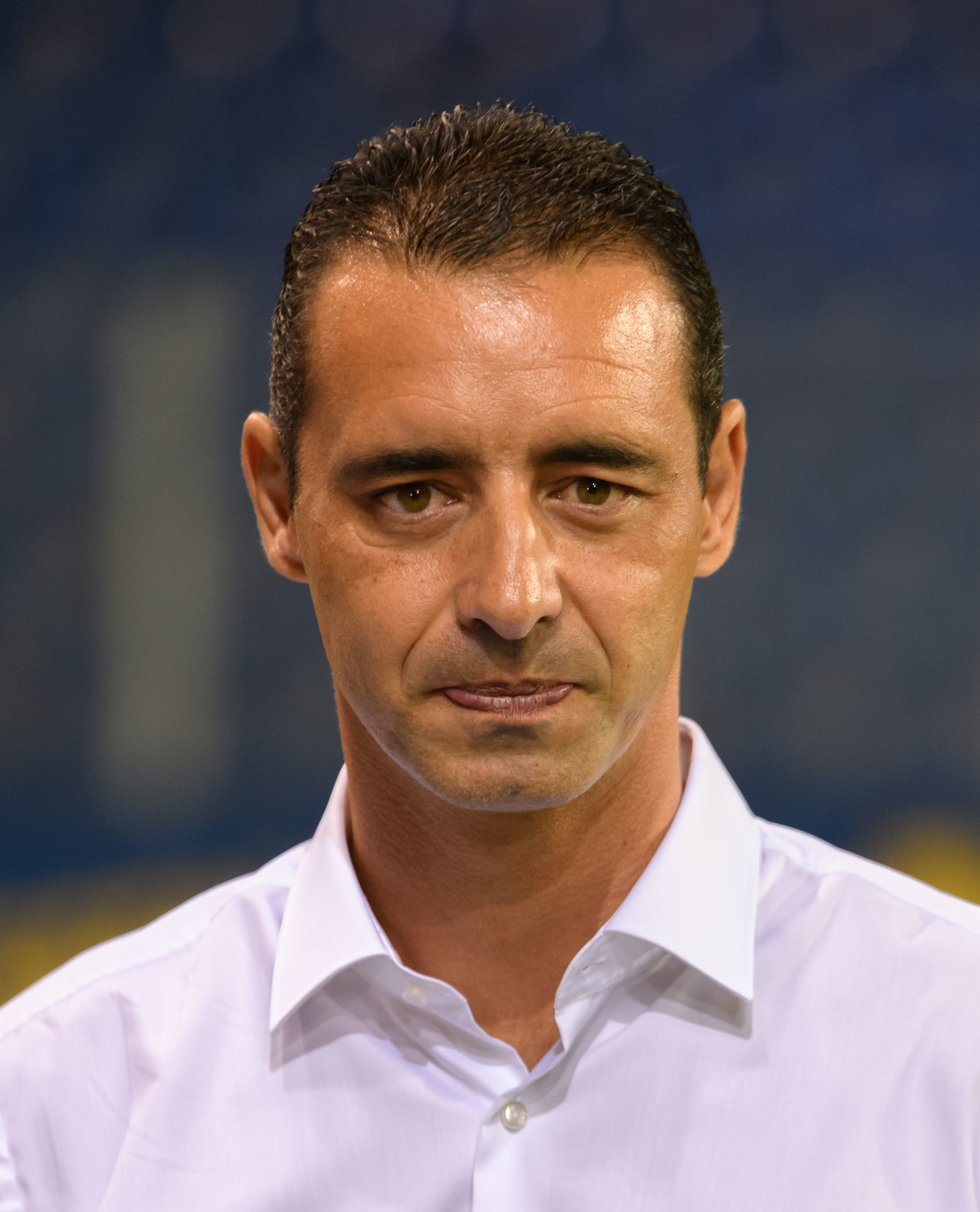
- Echouafni in 2018

Personal information
- Date of birth: 13 September 1972 (age 54)
- Place of birth: Menton, Alpes-Maritimes, France
- Height: 1.84 m (6 ft 0 in)
- Position: Midfielder

Youth career
- Marseille

Senior career*
Years	Team	Apps	(Gls)
1994–1998	Marseille	86	(8)
1998–2000	Strasbourg	63	(12)
2000–2003	Rennes	66	(3)
2003–2010	Nice	207	(9)
Total		422	(33)

Managerial career
- 2013–2014: Amiens
- 2014–2015: Sochaux
- 2016–2017: France (women)
- 2018–2021: Paris Saint-Germain (women)
- 2022–2024: Quevilly
- * Club domestic league appearances and goals

Olivier Echouafni (born 13 September 1972) is a French professional football manager and former player who most recently was the head coach of French Ligue 2 club Quevilly.

== Coaching career ==
Echouafni was the manager of Ligue 2 side Sochaux, before being removed from the coach's office by the club following his poor start to the season.

On 9 September 2016, he was appointed coach of the French women's national football team to replace Philippe Bergeroo.

In 2018 he became manager of Paris Saint-Germain Féminines. On 8 June 2022, he was appointed as manager of the Ligue 2 club Quevilly.

== Personal life ==
Echouafni is of Moroccan descent through his father.
