= Trophée des Championnes =

French football super cup game

- Organiser(s): FFF
- Founded: 2019; 7 years ago
- Abolished: 2025; 1 year ago
- Region: France
- Teams: 2
- Last champions: Lyon (3rd title)
- Most championships: Lyon (3 titles)
- Broadcaster: Canal+
- Website: Official website

The Trophée des Championnes was a French women's association football trophy contested as an annual match between the champions of Division 1 Féminine and the winners of the Coupe de France Féminine from previous season. It was the female equivalent to Trophée des Champions which is played since 1995. If both league and cup are won by the same team, the league runners-up were qualified to play this match as the second team.

Lyon was the most successful team in the competition, winning all three editions. In May 2025, it was confirmed that the competition had been discontinued.

== List of matches ==
Season	Winners	Score	Runners-up	Venue	Attendance	Ref
2019	Lyon	1–1 (4–3 pen.)	Paris Saint-Germain	Stade de Roudourou, Guingamp	12,588	
2020	Cancelled due to the COVID-19 pandemic					
2021	Cancelled due to the COVID-19 pandemic					
2022	Lyon	1–0	Paris Saint-Germain	Stade Marcel-Tribut, Dunkirk	4,472	
2023	Lyon	2–0	Paris Saint-Germain	Stade de l'Aube, Troyes	5,283	
2024	Cancelled due to fixture congestion					

== Performance by clubs ==
Club	Winners	Runners-up	Years won	Years runner-up
Lyon	3	0	2019, 2022, 2023	—
Paris Saint-Germain	0	3	—	2019, 2022, 2023
