= 2021–22 Paris Saint-Germain FC (women) season =

Paris Saint-Germain Féminine
2021–22 season
- Owner: Qatar Sports Investments
- President: Nasser Al-Khelaifi
- Head coach: Didier Ollé-Nicolle
- Stadium: Stade Jean-Bouin; Stade Municipal Georges Lefèvre; Parc des Princes
- Division 1 Féminine: 2nd
- Coupe de France Féminine: Winners
- Trophée des Championnes: Cancelled
- UEFA Women's Champions League: Semi-finals
- Top goalscorer: League: Marie-Antoinette Katoto (18); All: Marie-Antoinette Katoto (32)
- Highest home attendance: 43,255 vs Lyon, UEFA Women's Champions League, 30 April 2022
- Lowest home attendance: 75 vs Bordeaux Division 1 Féminine, 12 December 2021
- Biggest win: 8–0 vs Yzeure, Coupe de France Féminine, 15 May 2022
- Biggest defeat: 1–6 vs Lyon, Division 1 Féminine, 14 November 2021
| Home colours | Away colours | Third colours |

The 2021–22 season was the 51st season in the existence of Paris Saint-Germain Féminine and the club's 35th season in the top flight of French football. In addition to the domestic league, they participated in the Coupe de France Féminine and the UEFA Women's Champions League.

Ahead of the 2021–22 season, it was announced that Olivier Echouafni would leave the club after three seasons in charge with former Nice men's manager Didier Ollé-Nicolle replacing him as manager.

== Kits ==
| Home | Away | Third | Fourth |

== Competitions ==
=== Overall record ===
| Competition | First match | Last match | Starting round | Final position | Record | | | | | | | |
| Competition | First match | Last match | Starting round | Final position | Pld | W | D | L | GF | GA | GD | Win % |
|---|---|---|---|---|---|---|---|---|---|---|---|---|
| Division 1 Féminine | 29 August 2021 | 1 June 2022 | Matchday 1 | 2nd | 22 | 17 | 2 | 3 | 68 | 12 | +56 | 77.27 |
| Coupe de France Féminine | 9 January 2022 | 18 May 2022 | Round of 32 | Winners | 5 | 4 | 1 | 0 | 18 | 3 | +15 | 80.00 |
| Trophée des Championnes | Cancelled | | | | | | | | — | | | |
| UEFA Women's Champions League | 6 October 2021 | 30 April 2022 | Group stage | Semi-finals | 10 | 7 | 1 | 2 | 32 | 8 | +24 | 70.00 |
| Total | | | | | 37 | 28 | 4 | 5 | 118 | 23 | +95 | 75.68 |

Source: Soccerway

=== League table ===
| Pos | Team | Pld | W | D | L | GF | GA | GD | Pts | Qualification or relegation |
|---|---|---|---|---|---|---|---|---|---|---|
| 1 | Lyon (C) | 22 | 21 | 1 | 0 | 79 | 8 | +71 | 64 | Qualification for the Champions League group stage |
| 2 | Paris Saint-Germain | 22 | 17 | 2 | 3 | 68 | 12 | +56 | 53 | Qualification for the Champions League second round |
| 3 | Paris FC | 22 | 16 | 2 | 4 | 49 | 21 | +28 | 50 | Qualification for the Champions League first round |
| 4 | Fleury | 22 | 14 | 1 | 7 | 36 | 26 | +10 | 43 | |
| 5 | Montpellier | 22 | 11 | 2 | 9 | 38 | 25 | +13 | 35 | |

Source: Division 1 Féminine
Rules for classification: 1) points; 2) head-to-head points; 3) head-to-head goal difference; 4) goal difference; 5) goals scored
(C) Champions

==== Results summary ====
| Overall | | | | | | | | Home | | | | | | Away | | | | | |
| Pld | W | D | L | GF | GA | GD | Pts | W | D | L | GF | GA | GD | W | D | L | GF | GA | GD |
|---|---|---|---|---|---|---|---|---|---|---|---|---|---|---|---|---|---|---|---|
| 22 | 17 | 2 | 3 | 68 | 12 | +56 | 53 | 9 | 1 | 1 | 38 | 2 | +36 | 8 | 1 | 2 | 30 | 10 | +20 |

Source: FBRef

==== Results by round ====
| Match | 1 | 2 | 3 | 4 | 5 | 6 | 7 | 8 | 9 | 10 | 11 | 12 | 13 | 14 | 15 | 16 | 17 | 18 | 19 | 20 | 21 | 22 |
|---|---|---|---|---|---|---|---|---|---|---|---|---|---|---|---|---|---|---|---|---|---|---|
| Ground | H | A | A | H | H | H | A | A | H | A | H | A | A | H | A | H | H | A | H | A | H | A |
| Result | W | W | W | W | W | W | W | L | W | W | W | W | W | W | W | D | W | D | W | W | L | L |
| Position | 1 | 2 | 2 | 2 | 2 | 2 | 2 | 2 | 2 | 2 | 2 | 2 | 2 | 2 | 2 | 2 | 2 | 2 | 2 | 2 | 2 | 2 |

Updated to match(es) played on 28 January 2023. Source: FBRef
A = Away; H = Home; W = Win; D = Draw; L = Loss

==== Matches ====
| 29 August 2021 1 | Paris Saint-Germain | 5–0 | Fleury | Saint-Germain-en-Laye |
| | Baltimore 14'; Däbritz 21'; Diani 35'; Yango 61' (o.g.); Bachmann 86' | | | Stadium: Stade Municipal Georges Lefèvre |

| 3 September 2021 2 | Montpellier | 0–1 | Paris Saint-Germain | Montpellier |
| | | | Däbritz 8' (pen.) | Stadium: Stade Bernard Gasset |

| 12 September 2021 3 | Soyaux | 0–2 | Paris Saint-Germain | Besançon |
| | | | Katoto 33'; Baltimore 67' | Stadium: Stade Léo Lagrange |

| 26 September 2021 4 | Paris Saint-Germain | 4–0 | Paris FC | Saint-Germain-en-Laye |
| | Katoto 18', 26'; Diani 43'; Däbritz 59' (pen.) | | | Stadium: Stade Municipal Georges Lefèvre |

| 10 October 2021 5 | Paris Saint-Germain | 6–0 | Guingamp | Saint-Germain-en-Laye |
| | Renard 3' (o.g.); Katoto 17', 40', 44'; Diallo 82'; Khelifi 87' | | | Stadium: Stade Municipal Georges Lefèvre |

| 17 October 2021 6 | Paris Saint-Germain | 2–0 | Saint-Étienne | Saint-Germain-en-Laye |
| | Däbritz 43'; Katoto 66' | | | Stadium: Stade Municipal Georges Lefèvre |

| 31 October 2021 7 | Dijon | 0–3 | Paris Saint-Germain | Dijon |
| | | | Diani 35'; Goetsch 58' (o.g.); Katoto 60' | Stadium: Stade Gaston Gérard |

| 14 November 2021 8 | Lyon | 6–1 | Paris Saint-Germain | Décines-Charpieu |
| 21:00 CET (UTC+1) | Macario 15' (pen.) van de Donk 18'; Malard 53'; Egurrola 59'; Hegerberg 79', 82' | Report | Lawrence (red card) 26'; Ilestedt 75' | Stadium: Parc Olympique Lyonnais; Referee: Silvia Andreia Rosa Domingos |

| 21 November 2021 9 | Paris Saint-Germain | 7–0 | Reims | Saint-Germain-en-Laye |
| | Khelifi 5', 38'; Dudek 25'; Diani 45', 85' (pen.); Baltimore 55' (pen.); Huitema 74' | | | Stadium: Stade Municipal Georges Lefèvre |

| 4 December 2021 10 | Issy | 0–3 | Paris Saint-Germain | Issy-les-Moulineaux |
| | | | Khelifi 53', 80'; Diani 90+2' | Stadium: Cité des Sports |

| 12 December 2021 11 | Paris Saint-Germain | 1–0 | Bordeaux | Saint-Germain-en-Laye |
| | Karchaoui 69' | | | Stadium: Stade Municipal Georges Lefèvre |

| 23 January 2022 13 | Saint-Étienne | 0–5 | Paris Saint-Germain | Saint-Étienne |
| | | | Katoto 10', 64', 68'; Diani 45+2'; Dudek 58' | Stadium: Stade Salif Keita |

| 5 February 2022 14 | Guingamp | 2–6 | Paris Saint-Germain | Guingamp |
| | Cambot 75'; Fleury 80' | | Geyoro 21'; Däbritz 28', 42'; Katoto 37', 67'; Diani 56' | Stadium: Stade de Roudourou |

| 11 February 2022 12 | Paris Saint-Germain | 5–0 | Dijon | Saint-Germain-en-Laye |
| | Geyoro 3'; Katoto 15', 42'; Baltimore 58'; Däbritz 70' | | | Stadium: Stade Municipal Georges Lefèvre |

| 27 February 2022 15 | Fleury | 0–4 | Paris Saint-Germain | Fleury-Mérogis |
| | | | Geyoro 8'; Dudek 22' (pen.); Diani 62'; Bachmann 89' | Stadium: Terrain Walter Felder |

| 11 March 2022 16 | Paris Saint-Germain | 0–0 | Montpellier | Saint-Germain-en-Laye |
| | | | | Stadium: Stade Municipal Georges Lefèvre |

| 18 March 2022 17 | Paris Saint-Germain | 2–0 | Soyaux | Saint-Germain-en-Laye |
| | Karchaoui 13'; Diallo 84' | | | Stadium: Stade Municipal Georges Lefèvre |

| 3 April 2022 18 | Paris FC | 0–0 | Paris Saint-Germain | Paris |
| | | | | Stadium: Stade Sébastien Charléty |

| 16 April 2022 19 | Paris Saint-Germain | 6–1 | Issy | Saint-Germain-en-Laye |
| | Katoto 31', 83'; Geyoro 49'; Däbritz 65'; Bachmann 90+1' | | Peruzzetto 35' | Stadium: Stade Municipal Georges Lefèvre |

| 7 May 2022 20 | Bordeaux | 1–5 | Paris Saint-Germain | Le Bouscat |
| | Gomes 76' | | Diani 14', 51', 87'; Katoto 66'; Huitema 90+4' | Stadium: Stade Sainte-Germaine |

| 29 May 2022 21 | Paris Saint-Germain | 0–1 | Lyon | Paris |
| 21:00 CEST (UTC+2) | | Report | Macario 3'; Egurrola (yellow card) 86' | Stadium: Stade Jean-Bouin; Referee: Alexandra Collin |

| 1 June 2022 22 | Reims | 0–1 | Paris Saint-Germain | Reims |
| | Dumornay 45+2' | | | Stadium: Stade Auguste-Delaune |

=== Coupe de France ===
| 9 January 2022 Round of 32 | Dijon | 0–0 (4–5 p) | Paris Saint-Germain | Dijon |
| | | | | Stadium: Stade des Poussots |

| 29 January 2022 Round of 16 | Paris Saint-Germain | 3–0 | Lyon | Saint-Germain-en-Laye |
| | | | | Stadium: Stade Municipal Georges Lefèvre |

| 5 March 2022 Quarter-final | Montpellier | 1–3 | Paris Saint-Germain | Montpellier |
| | | | | Stadium: Stade Bernard-Gasset |

| 26 March 2022 Semi-final | Fleury | 2–4 | Paris Saint-Germain | Fleury-Mérogis |
| | | | | Stadium: Stade Auguste Gentelet |

| 15 May 2022 Final | Yzeure | 0–8 | Paris Saint-Germain | Dijon |
| 18:15 | | Report | Katoto 3', 7', 31'; Dudek 9'; Lawrence 12', 58'; Däbritz 13', 72' | Stadium: Stade Gaston Gérard; Attendance: 4,596; Referee: Savina Elbour |

=== Trophée des Championnes ===
PSG qualified for the Trophée des Championnes by winning the 2020–21 Division 1 Féminine, but the match was cancelled due to the ongoing impacts of the COVID-19 pandemic in France.

=== UEFA Champions League ===
==== Group stage ====
The group stage draw was held on 13 September 2021.

| Pos | Team | Pld | W | D | L | GF | GA | GD | Pts | Qualification |
|---|---|---|---|---|---|---|---|---|---|---|
| 1 | (France) Paris Saint-Germain | 6 | 6 | 0 | 0 | 25 | 0 | +25 | 18 | Advance to Quarter-finals |
| 2 | (Spain) Real Madrid | 6 | 4 | 0 | 2 | 12 | 6 | +6 | 12 | Advance to Quarter-finals |
| 3 | (Ukraine) Zhytlobud-1 Kharkiv | 6 | 1 | 1 | 4 | 2 | 15 | −13 | 4 | |
| 4 | (Iceland) Breiðablik | 6 | 0 | 1 | 5 | 0 | 18 | −18 | 1 | |

Source: UEFA
Rules for classification: Group stage tiebreakers

| 6 October 2021 | Breiðablik (Iceland) | 0–2 | (France) Paris Saint-Germain | Kópavogur |
| 21:00 (19:00 WET) | | Report | Khelifi 17'; Geyoro 89' | Stadium: Kópavogsvöllur; Attendance: 1,412; Referee: Iuliana Demetrescu (Romania) |

| 13 October 2021 | Paris Saint-Germain (France) | 5–0 | (Ukraine) Zhytlobud-1 Kharkiv | Paris |
| 18:45 | Huitema 25', 32', 42'; Dudek 59'; Khelifi 88' | Report | | Stadium: Stade Jean-Bouin; Attendance: 1,088; Referee: Sara Persson (Sweden) |

| 9 November 2021 | Paris Saint-Germain (France) | 4–0 | (Spain) Real Madrid | Paris |
| 21:00 | Katoto 13', 54'; Däbritz 41'; Gálvez 65' (o.g.) | Report | | Stadium: Parc des Princes; Attendance: 18,344; Referee: Rebecca Welch (England) |

| 18 November 2021 | Real Madrid (Spain) | 0–2 | (France) Paris Saint-Germain | Madrid |
| 21:00 | | Report | Katoto 33'; Karchaoui 70' | Stadium: Alfredo Di Stéfano; Attendance: 2,502; Referee: Cheryl Foster (Wales) |

| 8 December 2021 | Zhytlobud-1 Kharkiv (Ukraine) | 0–6 | (France) Paris Saint-Germain | Kharkiv |
| 18:45 (19:45 EET) | | Report | Huitema 15'; Bachmann 21', 40'; Baltimore 37'; Fazer 44'; Ilestedt 54' | Stadium: Metalist OSC; Attendance: 1,617; Referee: Frida Nielsen (Denmark) |

| 16 December 2021 | Paris Saint-Germain (France) | 6–0 | (Iceland) Breiðablik | Paris |
| 18:45 | Bachmann 10'; Huitema 45', 90+4'; Diani 60'; Baltimore 69'; Luana 86' | Report | | Stadium: Stade Jean-Bouin; Attendance: 977; Referee: Ewa Augustyn (Poland) |

==== Knockout phase ====
The draw for the knockout phase was held on 20 December 2021.

===== Quarter-finals =====
| 22 March 2022 First Leg | Bayern Munich (Germany) | 1–2 | (France) Paris Saint-Germain | Munich |
| 18:45 | Bühl 84' | Report | Katoto 20', 71' | Stadium: Allianz Arena; Attendance: 13,000; Referee: Marta Huerta De Aza (Spain) |

| 30 March 2022 Second leg | Paris Saint-Germain (France) | 2–2 (a.e.t.) (4–3 agg.) | (Germany) Bayern Munich | Paris |
| 21:00 | Baltimore 17'; Bachmann 112' | Report | Kumagai 19'; Schüller 55' | Stadium: Parc des Princes; Attendance: 27,262; Referee: Esther Staubli (Switzerland) |

Paris Saint-Germain won 4–3 on aggregate.

===== Semi-finals =====
| 24 April 2022 First leg | Lyon (France) | 3–2 | (France) Paris Saint-Germain | Décines-Charpieu |
| 17:00 | Renard 23' (pen.); Macario 34', 50' | Report | Katoto 6'; Dudek 58' (pen.) | Stadium: Parc Olympique Lyonnais; Attendance: 22,774; Referee: Ivana Martinčić (Croatia) |

| 30 April 2022 Second leg | Paris Saint-Germain (France) | 1–2 (3–5 agg.) | (France) Lyon | Paris |
| 21:00 | Katoto 62' | Report | Hegerberg 14'; Renard 83' | Stadium: Parc des Princes; Attendance: 43,255; Referee: Rebecca Welch (England) |

Lyon won 5–3 on aggregate.
