= 2022–23 Paris Saint-Germain FC (women) season =

Paris Saint-Germain
2022–23 season
- Owner: Qatar Sports Investments
- President: Nasser Al-Khelaifi
- Head coach: Gérard Prêcheur
- Stadium: Stade Jean-Bouin; Stade Municipal Georges Lefèvre; Parc des Princes
- Division 1 Féminine: 2nd
- Coupe de France Féminine: Runners-up
- Trophée des Championnes: Runners-up
- UEFA Women's Champions League: Quarter-final
- Top goalscorer: League: Kadidiatou Diani (17); All: Kadidiatou Diani (26)
- Highest home attendance: 17,465 vs Wolfsburg, UEFA Women's Champions League, 22 March 2023
- Lowest home attendance: 411 vs Soyaux Division 1 Féminine, 9 September 2022
- Biggest win: 5–0 vs Vllaznia, UEFA Women's Champions League, 23 November 2022
- Biggest defeat: 0–3 vs Chelsea, UEFA Women's Champions League, 22 December 2022
Home colours	Away colours	Third colours
- All statistics correct as of 31 March 2023.

The 2022–23 season is the 52nd season in the existence of Paris Saint-Germain and the club's 36th season in the top flight of French football. In addition to the domestic league, they are participating in this season's edition of the Coupe de France Féminine having already exited in the quarter-finals of the UEFA Women's Champions League and finished runners-up to Lyon in the Trophée des Champions at the start of the season.

Ahead of the 2022–23 season, it was announced that Didier Ollé-Nicolle would leave the club after a single season in charge with former Lyon manager Gérard Prêcheur replacing him as manager. Former Lyon goalkeeper Sarah Bouhaddi also joined the club having won eight UEFA Women's Champions League titles and eleven French championships with OL. PSG also acquired two notable Dutch internationals in the summer window with Jackie Groenen joining the club for a reported fee of €150,000 from Manchester United and former World Player of the Year Lieke Martens joining on a free transfer from Barcelona.

However, the most notable news of the club's pre-season was an injury to Marie-Antoinette Katoto who had become the club's record goal scorer during the 2021–22 campaign. Katoto suffered a torn ACL while playing for France at the Euros against Belgium. The severity of the injury is likely to cause Katoto to miss the entirety of the 2022–23 season. In Katoto's absence, Kadidiatou Diani enjoyed the most prolific season of her professional career before her season was prematurely ended due to a clavicle fracture against Wolfsburg in the second leg of the Champions League quarter-final in March.

== Kits ==
Home	Away	Third	Fourth

== Players ==
=== First-team squad ===
As of 2 April 2023.

Note: Flags indicate national team as defined under FIFA eligibility rules; some limited exceptions apply. Players may hold more than one non-FIFA nationality.

No.	Pos.	Nation	Player
2	MF	USA	Korbin Albert
4	DF	POL	Paulina Dudek
5	DF	FRA	Élisa De Almeida
6	MF	FRA	Oriane Jean-François
7	DF	FRA	Sakina Karchaoui
8	MF	FRA	Grace Geyoro (co-captain)
9	FW	FRA	Marie-Antoinette Katoto
10	FW	SUI	Ramona Bachmann
11	FW	FRA	Kadidiatou Diani (co-captain)
12	DF	CAN	Ashley Lawrence
13	DF	SWE	Amanda Ilestedt
14	MF	FRA	Kheira Hamraoui
16	GK	FRA	Constance Picaud
17	FW	ISL	Berglind Björg Þorvaldsdóttir

No.	Pos.	Nation	Player
18	MF	FRA	Laurina Fazer
20	FW	DEN	Amalie Vangsgaard
21	MF	FRA	Sandy Baltimore
22	FW	NED	Lieke Martens
23	DF	AUT	Marina Georgieva
24	MF	NED	Jackie Groenen
26	DF	CHN	Li Mengwen (on loan from Jiangsu)
29	FW	FRA	Manssita Traoré
30	GK	CZE	Barbora Votíková
50	GK	FRA	Sarah Bouhaddi

=== Other players under contract ===
Note: Flags indicate national team as defined under FIFA eligibility rules; some limited exceptions apply. Players may hold more than one non-FIFA nationality.

No.	Pos.	Nation	Player
3	DF	JAM	Allyson Swaby (on loan from Angel City)

== Transfers ==
=== In ===
No.	Pos.	Player	Transferred from	Fee	Date	Source
22	FW	(Netherlands) Lieke Martens	(Spain) Barcelona	Free	16 June 2022	
1	GK	(Australia) Lydia Williams	(England) Arsenal	Free	21 July 2022	
6	MF	(France) Oriane Jean-François	(France) Paris FC	Free	27 July 2022	
23	DF	(Austria) Marina Georgieva	(Germany) SC Sand	Free	11 August 2022	
17	FW	(Iceland) Berglind Björg Thorvaldsdottir	(Norway) Brann	Undisclosed	25 August 2022	
26	DF	(China) Li Mengwen	(China) Jiangsu	Loan	2 September 2022	
28	MF	(China) Yang Lina	(China) Shanghai Shengli	Loan	13 September 2022	
24	MF	(Netherlands) Jackie Groenen	(England) Manchester United	€150,000	15 September 2022	
50	GK	(France) Sarah Bouhaddi	(France) Lyon	Undisclosed	16 September 2022	
20	FW	(Denmark) Amalie Vangsgaard	(Sweden) Linköping	Undisclosed	10 January 2023	
3	DF	(Jamaica) Allyson Swaby	(United States) Angel City FC	Loan (Note: Due to an administrative error, Swaby's registration was not officially completed before the transfer window closed and, as a result, the player was not eligible to play during the 2022–23 season.)	30 January 2023	
2	MF	(United States) Korbin Albert	(United States) University of Notre Dame	Free	31 January 2023	

=== Out ===
No.	Pos.	Player	Transferred to	Fee	Date	Source
40	GK	(Germany) Charlotte Voll	(Austria) FFC Vorderland	Free	7 June 2022	
13	MF	(Germany) Sara Däbritz	(France) Lyon	Free	9 June 2022	
6	MF	(Brazil) Luana	(Brazil) Corinthians	Free	20 June 2022	
27	MF	(France) Léa Khelifi	(France) Montpellier	Free	30 June 2022	
20	MF	(France) Aminata Diallo	Retired (Note: Later returned to football on a free transfer to Levante.)		30 June 2022	
17	FW	(Norway) Celin Bizet Ildhusøy	(England) Spurs	Undisclosed	10 August 2022	
28	DF	(France) Jade Le Guilly	(Spain) Real Sociedad	Loan	6 September 2022	
27	FW	(France) Océane Hurtré	(France) Dijon	Loan	6 September 2022	
20	FW	(France) Hawa Sangare	(Italy) Pomigliano	Loan	22 September 2022	
40	GK	(France) Alice Pinguet	(France) Issy	Loan	18 October 2022	
20	FW	(France) Hawa Sangare	(France) Dijon	Loan (Note: Previous loan at Pomigliano was cancelled.)	10 January 2023	
28	MF	(China) Yang Lina	(China) Shanghai Shengli	Loan Terminated	16 January 2023	
1	GK	(Australia) Lydia Williams	(England) Brighton & Hove Albion	Free	19 January 2023	
19	DF	(France) Estelle Cascarino	(England) Manchester United	Loan (Note: Manchester United have a purchase option.)	21 January 2023	
2	DF	(France) Bénédicte Simon	(Italy) Juventus	Free	30 January 2023	
25	MF	(France) Magnaba Folquet	(France) Fleury	Loan	30 January 2023	

== Pre-season and friendlies ==
PSG began the season by competing in the four-team AMOS Women's French Cup held in Toulouse. The club then travelled to Catalonia for a temporary training camp ahead of their return to France for the Trophée des Championnes before playing a final in-season friendly at the club's training facility prior to their opening match of the league season.

Win Draw Loss Fixtures

16 August 2022 Friendly	Paris Saint-Germain (France)	0–1	(England) Manchester United	Toulouse
21:00 CEST (UTC+2)		Report	Zelem 66'	Stadium: Stade Ernest-Wallon

19 August 2022 Friendly	Barcelona (Spain)	1–1 (5–4 p)	(France) Paris Saint-Germain	Toulouse
18:00 CEST (UTC+2)	Geyse 38'	Report	Ngueleu 30'	Stadium: Stade Ernest-Wallon

23 August 2022 Friendly	Levante Las Planas (Spain)	1–2	(France) Paris Saint-Germain	Palamós
	Mellado 55'	Report	Dudek 50'; Diani 57'	Stadium: Estadi Municipal de Palamos

3 September 2022 Friendly	Paris Saint-Germain (France)	3–0	(France) Issy	Saint-Germain-en-Laye
	Folquet; Traore; Martens	Report		Stadium: Camp des Loges

== Competitions ==
=== Overall record ===
Competition	First match	Last match	Starting round	Final position	Record							
Competition	First match	Last match	Starting round	Final position	Pld	W	D	L	GF	GA	GD	Win %
Division 1 Féminine	9 September 2022	27 May 2023	Matchday 1		20	16	4	0	42	11	+31	80.00
Coupe de France Féminine	8 January 2023	13 May 2023	Round of 32	Runners-up	5	3	1	1	7	3	+4	60.00
Trophée des Championnes	28 August 2022		Final	Runners-up	1	0	0	1	0	1	−1	0.00
UEFA Women's Champions League	21 September 2022	30 March 2023	Second qualifying round	Quarter-final	10	5	2	3	16	8	+8	50.00
Total					36	24	7	5	65	23	+42	66.67

Last updated: 17 May 2023
Source: Soccerway

=== Division 1 Féminine ===
==== League table ====
Pos	Team	Pld	W	D	L	GF	GA	GD	Pts	Qualification or relegation
1	Lyon (C)	22	20	1	1	69	9	+60	61	Qualification for the Champions League group stage
2	Paris Saint-Germain	22	17	4	1	45	12	+33	55	Qualification for the Champions League second round
3	Paris FC	22	12	6	4	44	18	+26	42	Qualification for the Champions League first round
4	Fleury	22	11	6	5	49	20	+29	39	
5	Montpellier	22	11	4	7	37	27	+10	37	

Source: Division 1 Féminine
Rules for classification: 1) points; 2) head-to-head points; 3) head-to-head goal difference; 4) goal difference; 5) goals scored
(C) Champions

==== Results summary ====
Overall								Home						Away					
Pld	W	D	L	GF	GA	GD	Pts	W	D	L	GF	GA	GD	W	D	L	GF	GA	GD
20	16	4	0	42	11	+31	52	8	2	0	19	5	+14	8	2	0	23	6	+17

Last updated: 17 May 2023.
Source: FBRef

==== Results by round ====
Game	1	2	3	4	5	6	7	8	9	10	11	12	13	14	15	16	17	18	19	20	21	22
Ground	H	A	H	A	H	A	H	A	H	A	A	H	A	H	A	H	A	H	A	H	H	A
Result	W	W	W	D	W	W	D	W	W	W	W	W	D	W	W	W	W	W	W	D		
Position	6	1	2	2	2	2	2	2	2	2	1	1	2	2	2	2	2	2	2	2		

Updated to match(es) played on 17 May 2023. Source: FBRef
A = Away; H = Home; W = Win; D = Draw; L = Loss

==== Matches ====
9 September 2022 1	Paris Saint-Germain	2–0	Soyaux	Saint-Germain-en-Laye
21:00 CEST (UTC+2)	Martens 5'; Diani 34'	Report		Stadium: Stade Municipal Georges Lefèvre; Attendance: 411; Referee: Maika Vanderstichel

17 September 2022 2	Rodez	0–4	Paris Saint-Germain	Rodez
14:30 CEST (UTC+2)		Report	Geyoro 19', 90+2'; Karchaoui 50'; Diani 58'	Stadium: Stade Paul-Lignon; Attendance: 1,212; Referee: Alexandra Collin

25 September 2022 3	Paris Saint-Germain	2–1	Fleury	Saint-Germain-en-Laye
12:45 CEST (UTC+2)	Geyoro 38'; Diani 90+1'	Report	Louis 16'	Stadium: Stade Municipal Georges Lefèvre; Attendance: 436; Referee: Audrey Gerbel

2 October 2022 4	Le Havre	2–2	Paris Saint-Germain	Le Havre
12:45 CEST (UTC+2)	Sumo 39'; Gavory 52'	Report	Diani 9' (pen.); Bachmann 38'	Stadium: Stade Océane; Attendance: 1,400; Referee: Aurélie Efe

15 October 2022 5	Paris Saint-Germain	3–1	Dijon	Saint-Germain-en-Laye
14:30 CEST (UTC+2)	Martens 3'; Geyoro 43'; Bachmann 90'	Report	Roth 18'	Stadium: Stade Municipal Georges Lefèvre; Attendance: 606; Referee: Victoria Beyer

29 October 2022 6	Reims	0–2	Paris Saint-Germain	Reims
14:30 CEST (UTC+2)		Report	Diani 42', 47'	Stadium: Stade Auguste-Delaune; Attendance: 1,019; Referee: Charlène Laur

5 November 2022 7	Paris Saint-Germain	2–2	Montpellier	Saint-Germain-en-Laye
13:30 CEST (UTC+2)	Baltimore 31'; Groenen 49'	Report	Mondésir 24'; Boureille 87'	Stadium: Stade Municipal Georges Lefèvre; Attendance: 684; Referee: Émeline Rochebilière

20 November 2022 8	Bordeaux	0–3	Paris Saint-Germain	Bordeaux
14:00 CEST (UTC+2)		Report	Diani 45+2'; Baltimore 58'; Jean-François 71'	Stadium: Stade Sainte-Germaine; Attendance: 1,346; Referee: Clémence Goncalves

26 November 2022 9	Paris Saint-Germain	1–0	Guingamp	Saint-Germain-en-Laye
14:30 CEST (UTC+2)	Diani 30'	Report		Stadium: Stade Municipal Georges Lefèvre; Attendance: 556; Referee: Alexandra Collin

4 December 2022 10	Paris FC	0–1	Paris Saint-Germain	Paris
13:00 CEST (UTC+2)		Report	Baltimore 55'	Stadium: Stade Charléty; Attendance: 3,293; Referee: Audrey Gerbel

11 December 2022 11	Lyon	0–1	Paris Saint-Germain	Décines-Charpieu
14:30 CEST (UTC+2)		Report	Diani 87'	Stadium: Groupama Stadium; Attendance: 13,400; Referee: Maika Vanderstichel

13 January 2023 12	Paris Saint-Germain	1–0	Rodez	Saint-Germain-en-Laye
18:30 CEST (UTC+2)	Diani 43' (pen.)	Report		Stadium: Stade Municipal Georges Lefèvre; Attendance: 462; Referee: Clémence Goncalves

20 January 2023 13	Fleury	4–4	Paris Saint-Germain	Bondoufle
21:00 CEST (UTC+2)	Kamczyk 15'; Kouassi 29', 74'; Fontaine 70'	Report	Diani 21', 39', 49'; Bachmann 27'	Stadium: Stade Robert Bobin; Attendance: 1,698; Referee: Audrey Gerbel

5 February 2023 14	Paris Saint-Germain	3–1	Le Havre	Saint-Germain-en-Laye
12:45 CEST (UTC+2)	Martens 44'; Diani 69' (pen.); Fazer 90+3'	Report	Ali Nadjim 47'	Stadium: Stade Municipal Georges Lefèvre

25 February 2023 15	Dijon	0–4	Paris Saint-Germain	Dijon
			Bachmann 30'; Diani 56' (pen.), 74'; Sandvej 73' (o.g.)	Stadium: Stade des Poussots

11 March 2023 16	Paris Saint-Germain	4–0	Reims	Saint-Germain-en-Laye
12:45	Diani 11'; Bachmann 16'; Vangsgaard 64'; Baltimore 77'	Report		Stadium: Stade Municipal Georges Lefèvre

25 March 2023 17	Montpellier	0–1	Paris Saint-Germain	Sussargues
17:15	Schmitz (yellow card) 38' (yellow-red card) 87'	Report	Bachmann 40'; Diani (penalty missed) '39 (red card) 87'; Lawrence (yellow card) 70'	Stadium: Stade Jules Rimet

1 April 2023 18	Paris Saint-Germain	1-0	Bordeaux	Saint-Germain-en-Laye
12:45	Traoré 55'	Report		Stadium: Stade Municipal Georges Lefèvre; Attendance: 727; Referee: Victoria Beyer

15 April 2023 19	Guingamp	0-1	Paris Saint-Germain	Guingamp
12:30		Report	Geyoro 30'	Stadium: Stade de Roudourou; Attendance: 1,651; Referee: Clemence Goncalves

6 May 2023 20	Paris Saint-Germain	0-0	Paris FC	Saint-Germain-en-Laye
15:00		Report		Stadium: Stade Municipal Georges Lefèvre; Attendance: 814; Referee: Audrey Gerbel

20 May 2023 21	Paris Saint-Germain	0-1	Lyon	Paris
20:00		Report	Bruun 88'	Stadium: Parc des Princes; Attendance: 18,876; Referee: Victoria Beyer

27 May 2023 22	Soyaux	0-3	Paris Saint-Germain	Soyaux
16:30		Report	Bachmann 36'; Vangsgaard 59'; Baltimore 66'	Stadium: Stade Léo Lagrange; Attendance: 897; Referee: Maika Vanderstichel

=== Coupe de France ===
8 January 2023 Round of 32	US Orléans	1–3	Paris Saint-Germain	Orléans
	Picault 58'	Report	Ilestedt 48'; Diani 53'; Geyoro 81'	Stadium: Stade de la Source

28 January 2023 Round of 16	Dijon	0–2	Paris Saint-Germain	Dijon
14:30 CEST (UTC+2)		Report	Diani 48', 89'	Stadium: DFCO Centre d’Entraînement

4 March 2023 Quarter-final	Bordeaux	0–0 (4–5 p)	Paris Saint-Germain	Bordeaux
				Stadium: Stade Sainte-Germaine

18 March 2023 Semi-final	Paris Saint-Germain	1–0	Thonon Evian Grand Genève FC	Paris
16:00	Hamraoui 60'

13 May 2023 Final	Paris Saint-Germain	1-2	Lyon	Orléans
	Bachmann 35' (pen.)	Report	Hegerberg 12', 23'	Stadium: Stade de la Source

=== Trophée des Championnes ===
28 August 2022 Final	Lyon	1–0	Paris Saint-Germain	Dunkirk
21:00 CEST (UTC+2)	van de Donk 13'; Morroni (yellow card) 29'	Report		Stadium: Stade Marcel-Tribut; Referee: Émeline Rochebilière (France)

=== UEFA Champions League ===
==== Second Qualifying Round ====
The draw for the second qualifying round was held on 1 September 2022.

21 September 2022 First leg	Paris Saint-Germain (France)	2–1	(Sweden) BK Häcken	Paris
20:30	Martens 14'; Diani 86'	Report	Bergman-Lundin 24'	Stadium: Stade Jean Bouin; Attendance: 1,671; Referee: Elvira Nurmustafina (Kazakhstan)

28 September 2022 Second leg	BK Häcken (Sweden)	0–2 (4–1 agg.)	(France) Paris Saint-Germain	Gothenburg
18:45		Report	Martens 53'; Diani 60'	Stadium: Hisingen Arena; Attendance: 5,118; Referee: Ivana Projkovska (North Macedonia)

Paris Saint-Germain won 4–1 on aggregate.

==== Group stage ====
The group stage draw was held on 3 October 2022.

Pos	Team	Pld	W	D	L	GF	GA	GD	Pts	Qualification	CHE	PAR	MAD	VLL
1	(England) Chelsea	6	5	1	0	19	1	+18	16	Advance to Quarter-finals	—	3–0	2–0	8–0
2	(France) Paris Saint-Germain	6	3	1	2	11	5	+6	10	Advance to Quarter-finals	0–1	—	2–1	5–0
3	(Spain) Real Madrid	6	2	2	2	9	6	+3	8		1–1	0–0	—	5–1
4	(Albania) Vllaznia	6	0	0	6	1	28	−27	0		0–4	0–4	0–2	—

Source: UEFA
Rules for classification: Group stage tiebreakers

20 October 2022 1	Paris Saint-Germain (France)	0–1	(England) Chelsea	Paris
21:00		Report	Bright 27'	Stadium: Stade Jean-Bouin; Attendance: 5,222; Referee: Ewa Augustyn (Poland)

26 October 2022 2	Real Madrid (Spain)	0–0	(France) Paris Saint-Germain	Madrid
18:45		Report		Stadium: Alfredo Di Stéfano; Attendance: 1,544; Referee: Jana Adámková (Czech Republic)

23 November 2022 3	Paris Saint-Germain (France)	5–0	(Albania) Vllaznia	Paris
18:45	Geyoro 39'; Gjergji 44' (o.g.); Bachmann 60' (pen.); Baltimore 76'; Folquet 85'	Report		Stadium: Stade Jean-Bouin; Attendance: 1,643; Referee: Maria Marotta (Italy)

8 December 2022 4	Vllaznia (Albania)	0–4	(France) Paris Saint-Germain	Shkodër
18:45		Report	Diani 19' (pen.), 36'; Bachmann 60'; Folquet 81'	Stadium: Loro Boriçi Stadium; Attendance: 900; Referee: Frida Nielsen (Denmark)

16 December 2022 5	Paris Saint-Germain (France)	2–1	(Spain) Real Madrid	Paris
21:00	De Almeida 15'; Diani 60' (pen.)	Report	Zornoza 81'	Stadium: Parc des Princes; Attendance: 16,319; Referee: Lina Lehtovaara (Finland)

22 December 2022 6	Chelsea (England)	3–0	(France) Paris Saint-Germain	Fulham
21:00	Kerr 42'; James 55', 62'	Report		Stadium: Stamford Bridge; Attendance: 10,129; Referee: Iuliana Demetrescu (Romania)

==== Knockout phase ====
===== Quarter-finals =====
The draw for the quarter-finals will be held on 10 February 2023.

22 March 2023 First leg	Paris Saint-Germain (France)	0–1	(Germany) Wolfsburg	Paris
21:00 CET		Report	Janssen 62' (pen.)	Stadium: Parc des Princes; Attendance: 17,465; Referee: Rebecca Welch (England)

30 March 2023 Second leg	Wolfsburg (Germany)	1–1 (2–1 agg.)	(France) Paris Saint-Germain	Wolfsburg
18:45	Popp 20'	Report	Diani 30'	Stadium: Volkswagen Arena; Referee: Cheryl Foster (Wales)

== Statistics ==
=== Goals ===
As of match played 27 March 2023

Rank	Pos.	No.	Player	Division 1	Coupe de France	Trophée des Championnes	Champions League	Total
1	FW	11	(France) Kadidiatou Diani	17	3	0	6	26
2	FW	10	(Switzerland) Ramona Bachmann	6	1	0	2	9
3	MF	8	(France) Grace Geyoro	5	1	0	1	7
4	MF	21	(France) Sandy Baltimore	4	0	0	1	5
4	FW	22	(Netherlands) Lieke Martens	3	0	0	2	5
6	MF	25	(France) Magnaba Folquet	0	0	0	2	2
7	DF	7	(France) Sakina Karchaoui	1	0	0	0	1
7	MF	6	(France) Oriane Jean-François	1	0	0	0	1
7	MF	24	(Netherlands) Jackie Groenen	1	0	0	0	1
7	MF	18	(France) Laurina Fazer	1	0	0	0	1
7	FW	20	(Denmark) Amalie Vangsgaard	1	0	0	0	1
7	FW	29	(France) Manssita Traoré	1	0	0	0	1
7	DF	13	(Sweden) Amanda Ilestedt	0	1	0	0	1
7	MF	14	(France) Kheira Hamraoui	0	1	0	0	1
7	DF	5	(France) Élisa De Almeida	0	0	0	1	1
Own goals				1	0	0	1	2
Total				42	7	0	16	65
