= Hamraoui case =

Case involving assault of Kheira Hamraoui

The Hamraoui case (French: Affaire Hamraoui) refers to the November 2021 assault of French footballer Kheira Hamraoui, the speculation involved, the response of her team Paris Saint-Germain, and the ongoing criminal investigation.

On 4 November 2021, Hamraoui was being driven home by teammate Aminata Diallo. Two masked men stopped the car and dragged Hamraoui from it, beating her on the legs. Suspected attackers have been arrested over the course of investigation, as has Diallo on two occasions. Diallo, who had become Hamraoui's substitute when they rejoined the club, was quickly suspected of having arranged the attack; Diallo, of West African descent, denied being part of the attack and claimed that racial prejudice was involved in the suspicion.

Subsequently, ethnic conflict seemed to arise when some Paris Saint-Germain teammates of African and Caribbean descents (Kadidiatou Diani, Marie-Antoinette Katoto and Sandy Baltimore) sided against Hamraoui, excluding her in the dressing room and encouraging the team's fans to send support to Diallo and hate to Hamraoui. The staff of the club increasingly sidelined Hamraoui during the remainder of her time with them, and did not try to quell the fan hate; Hamraoui felt that the club itself favoured Diallo and wanted Hamraoui to be unhappy so that she would leave. Both players left the club at the end of their contracts: Diallo in 2022 and Hamraoui in 2023.

== Background ==
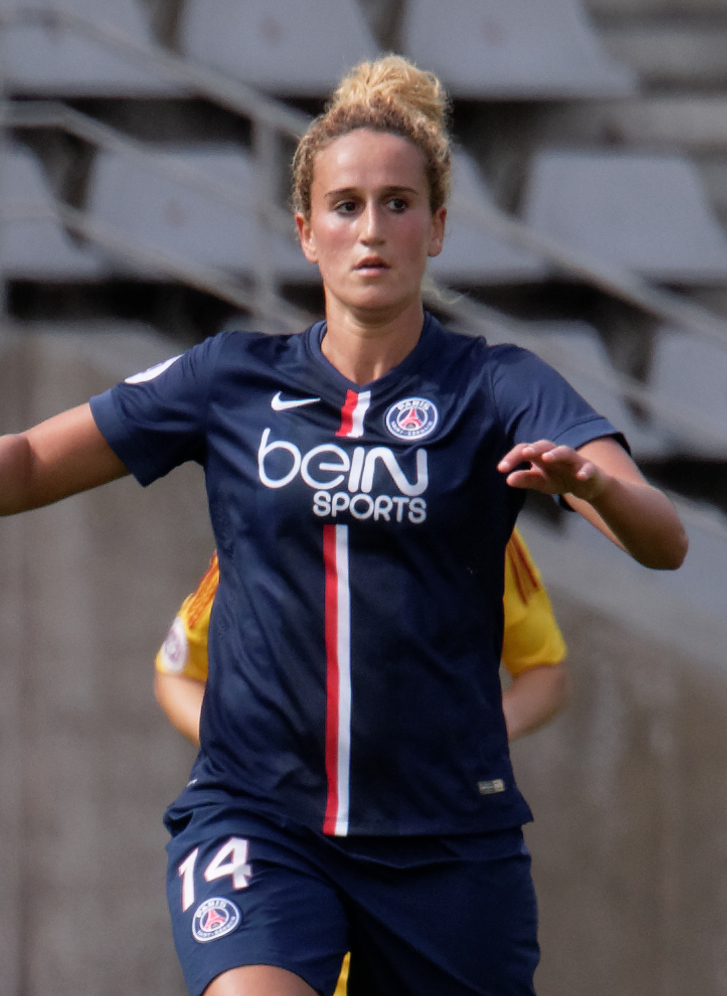
Hamraoui in 2015 during her first stint with Paris Saint-Germain

Kheira Hamraoui and Aminata Diallo are both French football midfielders; Hamraoui is of Algerian (North African) descent, and Diallo is of Senegalese (West African) descent. Hamraoui joined Paris Saint-Germain (PSG) for the second time in July 2021, from FC Barcelona Femení, taking a position in the starting line-up. Diallo had joined PSG in the summer of 2016, when Hamraoui left after her first stint with the club; Diallo had less game time following Hamraoui's return. During her time in Barcelona, Hamraoui had an affair with Eric Abidal, a French former player who was the sporting director of FC Barcelona at the time. Diallo was also in Spain for some of the time Hamraoui was in Barcelona, spending 18 months on loan at Atlético Madrid Femenino; the two were friends and had gone on holiday together in this period.

== Attack ==
A PSG women's team meal was held on 4 November 2021. Several weeks earlier, members of the team received phone calls from an unknown caller telling them to stay away from Hamraoui.

Diallo had driven Hamraoui and Sakina Karchaoui to the meal after the club recommended carpooling, with the three leaving the restaurant together at around 22:30. Diallo was tentatively pulling out after dropping off Karchaoui at her home in the suburb of Chatou when two masked men came out from behind a nearby van and slammed on the car bonnet, telling Diallo and Hamraoui to unlock the doors; one held Diallo in the driver's seat while the other hit Hamraoui with an iron bar to force her out of the car, dragging her into the street and beating her, particularly her legs, with the bar. She tried to block these blows with her hands. Hamraoui reported that during the attack she heard the men speak about a married man; Diallo later told the police she heard one of them say "So like that, you touch married men?", as well as sexual insults, over Hamraoui screaming. The attackers left after less than a minute, with Hamraoui getting herself back into the car. She and Diallo called Karchaoui to tell her what had happened; Karchaoui came back to the car and Diallo drove them to an emergency department.

PSG put its three players and a friend of Hamraoui's up in a Holiday Inn near the team's training ground; during the night, the four speculated on who may have attacked Hamraoui, with "people familiar with the conversations" saying that Hamraoui had adamantly believed it was someone from PSG from the start, including naming César Mavacala, a sports agent to various PSG players. Mavacala was close to, among others, Kadidiatou Diani. The next morning, Abidal called Hamraoui; she placed the call on speakerphone as the others were in the room. Hamraoui asked Abidal if his wife may want to hurt her and then told him about the assault: Abidal reportedly "sounded stunned" at the news. Hamraoui received more medical treatment on the day after the attack while Diallo and Karchaoui returned to training, after which they and the players who had received the anonymous phone calls were interviewed by police.

== Paris Saint-Germain response ==
=== Club response ===
On the ride to the hospital, the three players called PSG, who sent assistant coach Bernard Mendy and the deputy head of security to the hospital. After Hamraoui was initially treated, the club arranged for its affected players, and Hamraoui's friend who had also gone to the hospital, to stay at a hotel near the team's training ground for their own safety. Over the next few days, PSG provided security details to watch the homes of Hamraoui, Diallo, and Karchaoui.

The club did not initially mention that an attack took place; Hamraoui was not fit enough to play in a match on 9 November 2021, with PSG saying she was not on the squad list for "personal reasons". For several weeks PSG scheduled Diallo and Hamraoui to train individually and not be at the ground at the same time, with both returning to team training in December 2021 after the French players' union requested their reintegration.

When Hamraoui left PSG in 2023, she described the previous two years as the worst in her career, saying that the club abandoned her and did everything to try and make her leave.

=== Player and fan responses ===
Hamraoui was able to return to training soon after the assault. When she did, Diani, angry that Hamraoui had suggested Mavacala as a suspect, confronted her on an exercise bike. Relationships among the players quickly frayed. The assault becoming public news was suggested to negatively affect the team, which lost an important game by a wide margin after it broke. Teammates had known about the assault since the day after it occurred, but started to request moving lockers further away from Hamraoui once it was public, with some telling the club that they would not feel comfortable playing with her. The team's "best players", though, reportedly just wanted to move on.

However, in February 2022, players connected to PSG continued to show preference. Marie-Antoinette Katoto became embroiled in a level of controversy after making a gesture in support of Diallo during a goal celebration for France.

== Investigations ==
Early on the morning of 10 November 2021, police officers came to Diallo's home, taking her in for questioning and searching her home. She was taken to the police station in Versailles; while being escorted to an interview room, an officer offhandedly asked her if she had heard of Tonya Harding – an American figure skater who was involved with an attack on her rival, Nancy Kerrigan, very similar to the one suffered by Hamraoui. Diallo declined the offer to have a lawyer present, not initially realising she was being interviewed as a suspect. The next day, Hamraoui attended the police station as part of a witness process, and told Diallo that she "had heard from other teammates that Diallo was behind the attack."

French police were also questioning a male suspect, imprisoned in Lyon and known as "Ja Ja", at the time, due to his connections with female footballers. They also pursued a line of inquiry relating to Hamraoui's affair with Abidal.

Having examined Diallo's internet search history, which included querying "how to break a knee" and recipes for poison, a French judge permitted police wiretapping Diallo's phone.

=== César Mavacala ===
After Mavacala became a subject of interest, other issues were investigated. In March 2023, Mavacala was charged with organised extortion by the French police based on his involvement in recruitment by the PSG women's team. Following the release of Diallo's tapes in the press, several journalists noted that Mavacala's circle, including various people at PSG, appeared to subscribe to racism, Black separatism and Afrocentrism, causing issues with other people.

== Aftermath ==
Diallo was still in police custody when the theory that she had planned the assault to take Hamraoui's place in the PSG and France teams was first published in the press; the intrigue of the case, its similarity to that of Harding and Kerrigan, and the connection to a wealthy football club meant the story entered the global news cycle shortly thereafter. Diallo's lawyers were critical of the difference in treatment she received from the police compared to Abidal.

Later in November 2021, Abidal's wife requested a divorce after discovering his infidelity due to the case: part of the investigation uncovered that Hamraoui's phone number was registered to Abidal.

Diallo's contract with PSG expired at the end of the 2021–22 season in July 2022, and was not renewed; she said she was surprised and had believed right until the last few days that PSG would keep her. After being charged with the assault in September 2022, she was placed under judicial supervision and forbidden from entering Paris or contacting her former team. The terms of her supervision initially included not leaving the country but, in January 2023, Spanish club Levante UD Femenino controversially announced that they had signed Diallo until the end of the 2022–23 season. Levante were second in the Spanish league behind Barcelona at the time, and their manager was Jose Luis Sanchez Vera, whom Diallo had worked with at Atlético Madrid. Her lawyers successfully petitioned the judge to allow her to leave France. Her Levante contract included the stipulation that she could not play any match against PSG or any match at which Hamraoui may be present. Levante declined an extension option for Diallo, and she left to join Al Nassr in the Saudi Women's Premier League in 2023.

Hamraoui's contract with PSG expired at the end of the 2022–23 season and she chose to join Club América of the Liga MX Femenil, considered one of the league's biggest signings, popular there due to her success with Barcelona.

Independent journalist Romain Molina, who is known for writing multiple exposés about sexual harassment in women's football, wrote shortly after the assault was made public that "so many people [would] want to take revenge on [Hamraoui] for matters of private life that we no longer know really where to look." The Paris judicial court referred Molina to the criminal court for his statement, with initial complaints of harassment, attempt to influence an investigation, and public defamation of Hamraoui filed in February 2022. He testified in 2023, before the court confirmed he would go to trial in 2024.
