= Marie-Antoinette Katoto =

French footballer (born 1998)

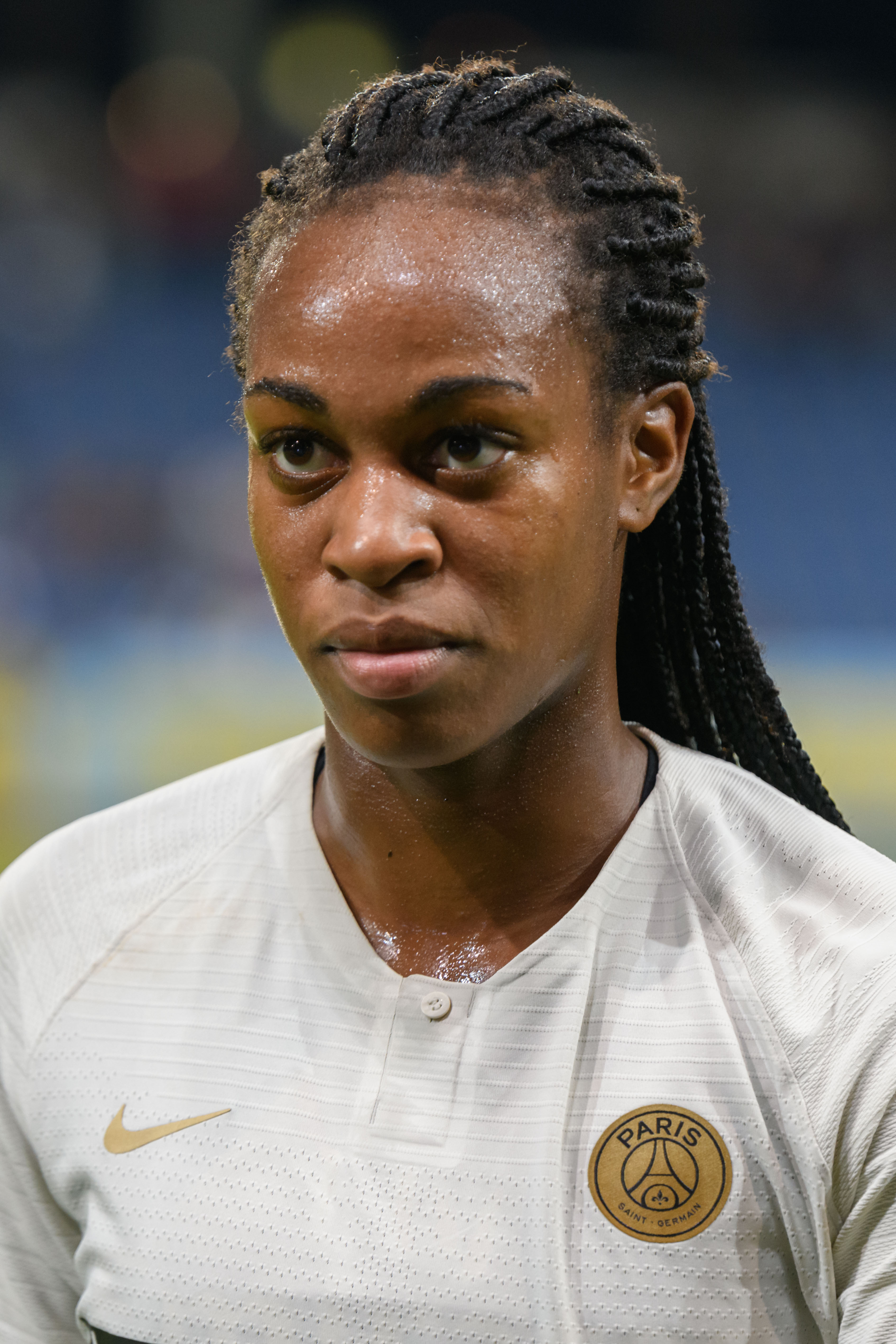
- Katoto with Paris Saint-Germain in 2018

Personal information
- Full name: Marie-Antoinette Oda Katoto
- Date of birth: 1 November 1998 (age 28)
- Place of birth: Colombes, France
- Height: 1.76 m (5 ft 9 in)
- Position: Striker

Team information
- Current team: Lyon
- Number: 9

Youth career
- 2005–2011: Colombes FFC
- 2011–2016: Paris Saint-Germain

Senior career*
Years	Team	Apps	(Gls)
2015–2025	Paris Saint-Germain	152	(131)
2025–	Lyon	28	(14)

International career^{‡}
2014	France U16	3	(5)
2015	France U17	9	(5)
2016	France U19	8	(8)
2016–2018	France U20	12	(5)
2019	France U23	3	(1)
2018–	France	67	(44)
Medal record
Women's football
Representing France
UEFA Women's Nations League
Runner-up	2024
Third place	2025
UEFA Women's Under-19 Championship
Winner	2016 Slovakia
- * Club domestic league appearances and goals as of 22 November 2026 ‡ National team caps and goals as of 10 October 2026

Marie-Antoinette Oda Katoto (born 1 November 1998) is a French professional footballer who plays as a striker for Première Ligue club Lyon and the France national team. Regarded as one of the best strikers in women's football, she is the all-time top scorer of Paris Saint-Germain.

== Club career ==
=== Paris Saint-Germain ===
Katoto started her youth career with Colombes FFC in 2005. She joined the youth academy of Paris Saint-Germain (PSG) in 2011. She went on to score 27 goals in 26 matches for the club's youth teams and helped them win the Championnat de France National Féminine U19 title in 2016.

Katoto made her senior team debut on 26 April 2015 against VfL Wolfsburg in the second leg of 2014–15 UEFA Women's Champions League semi-finals. The following week, manager Farid Benstiti handed her league debut in a 5–0 win over Rodez. She played the full 90 minutes and scored a goal in the match. During the 2017–18 league season, Katoto scored 21 goals, finishing as the league's second-highest scorer behind eventual Ballon d'Or Féminin winner Ada Hegerberg. On 31 May 2018, she helped PSG win the 2017–18 Coupe de France Féminine by scoring the only goal in the final against six-time defending champions Lyon.

On 5 February 2022, Katoto scored a brace in a league match against Guingamp and surpassed Marie-Laure Delie to become the all-time top scorer of PSG. On 1 July 2022, she signed a contract extension with the club until June 2025. On 9 January 2024, Katoto became the first official goalscorer at Campus PSG when she opened the scoring in a 6–0 league win against Lille. On 24 May 2025, she announced that she would leave PSG upon the expiration of her contract in June 2025.

=== Lyon ===
On 4 June 2025, Lyon announced the signing of Katoto on a four-year contract.

== International career ==
=== Youth ===
Katoto has represented France at various youth levels, earning 35 caps and scoring 24 goals. She was part of the French team that won the 2016 UEFA Women's Under-19 Championship. She finished the tournament as the top scorer with six goals and was named the tournament's best player. She was also a member of the team that reached the semi-finals of the 2018 FIFA U-20 Women's World Cup.

=== Senior ===
On 31 October 2018, Katoto received her first call-up to the senior team. She made her senior team debut on 10 November 2018 in a 3–1 friendly win over Brazil by coming on as a 66th-minute substitute for Delphine Cascarino. She scored her first international goal on 19 January 2019 in a 3–1 friendly win over the United States. In the lead-up to the match, France coach Corinne Diacre publicly criticised attitude and application of Katoto.

In May 2019, Diacre left Katoto out of the 23-player squad for the 2019 FIFA Women's World Cup, which was hosted by France. The decision caused widespread surprise, as Katoto had been the top scorer in the French league the previous season. Diacre however defended her decision, saying that it had been a difficult choice but one she stood by, while admitting that she would be criticized if France did not win the World Cup. France were eventually knocked out in the quarter-finals by the United States, who went on to defend their title.

On 17 September 2021, Katoto scored her first hat-trick for the national team in a 10–0 win against Greece. In May 2022, she was named in France's squad for the UEFA Women's Euro 2022. During the group stage match against Belgium, she suffered a knee injury that ruled her out for the remainder of the tournament.

On 24 February 2023, Katoto, along with Wendie Renard and Kadidiatou Diani, announced that they would no longer play for the national team. Katoto stated that she wanted changes to be made in the way the team was managed. In March 2023, French Football Federation sacked Diacre and named Hervé Renard as the new head coach. Katoto returned to the national team on 1 December 2023 in a 3–0 win over Austria. She came on as a 46th-minute substitute for Kadidiatou Diani and scored France's third goal, helping the team qualify for the 2024 UEFA Women's Nations League Finals.

In July 2024, Katoto was named in France's squad for the 2024 Olympics. Despite France being eliminated in the quarter-finals, she finished the tournament as the top scorer with five goals. In June 2025, she was named in the French squad for the UEFA Women's Euro 2025.

== Personal life ==
Katoto was born in France to DR Congolese parents.

Katoto has the same "adviser" as her former PSG teammates Kadidiatou Diani and Aminata Diallo, named César Mavacala. In February 2022, she caused controversy by supporting Diallo during a goal celebration in response to the Hamraoui case. In March 2023, Mavacala was charged with extortion by the French justice for his role in Katoto's contract negotiations with PSG.

== Career statistics ==
=== Club ===
As of match played 22 November 2026

Appearances and goals by club, season and competition
Club	Season	League			National cup		League cup		Continental		Other		Total	
Club	Season	Division	Apps	Goals	Apps	Goals	Apps	Goals	Apps	Goals	Apps	Goals	Apps	Goals
Paris Saint-Germain	2014–15	Première Ligue	2	1	0	0	—		1 (Note: Appearance(s) in UEFA Women's Champions League)	0	—		3	1
Paris Saint-Germain	2015–16	Première Ligue	7	3	1	0	—		2	0	—		10	3
Paris Saint-Germain	2016–17	Première Ligue	7	6	1	1	—		2	0	—		10	7
Paris Saint-Germain	2017–18	Première Ligue	21	21	6	5	—		—		—		27	26
Paris Saint-Germain	2018–19	Première Ligue	20	22	3	3	—		6	5	—		29	30
Paris Saint-Germain	2019–20	Première Ligue	16	16	4	3	—		4	5	1 (Note: Appearance in Trophée des Championnes)	0	25	24
Paris Saint-Germain	2020–21	Première Ligue	19	21	1	0	—		6	4	—		26	25
Paris Saint-Germain	2021–22	Première Ligue	21	18	5	7	—		7	7	—		33	32
Paris Saint-Germain	2022–23	Première Ligue	0	0	0	0	—		0	0	0	0	0	0
Paris Saint-Germain	2023–24	Première Ligue	20	11	2	1	—		11	7	2 (Note: Appearance(s) in playoffs)	1	35	20
Paris Saint-Germain	2024–25	Première Ligue	19	12	3	0	—		2	0	1	0	25	12
Paris Saint-Germain	Total		152	131	26	20	0	0	41	28	4	1	223	180
Lyon	2025–26	Première Ligue	20	6	5	7	3	2	10	1	2	0	40	16
Lyon	2026–27	Première Ligue	8	8	0	0	0	0	5	7	—		13	15
Lyon	Total		28	14	5	7	3	2	15	8	2	0	53	31
Career total			180	145	31	27	3	2	56	36	6	1	276	211

=== International ===
As of match played 10 October 2026

Appearances and goals by national team and year
National team	Year	Apps	Goals
France	2018	1	0
France	2019	6	3
France	2020	8	6
France	2021	8	10
France	2022	9	7
France	2023	1	1
France	2024	14	8
France	2025	13	5
France	2026	7	4
Total		67	44

Scores and results list France's goal tally first, score column indicates score after each Katoto goal.

List of international goals scored by Marie-Antoinette Katoto
No.	Date	Venue	Opponent	Score	Result	Competition
1	19 January 2019	Stade Océane, Le Havre, France	United States	3–0	3–1	Friendly
2	8 October 2019	Kazhymukan Munaitpasov Stadium, Shymkent, Kazakhstan	Kazakhstan	3–0	3–0	2022 UEFA Women's Euro qualification
3	9 November 2019	Nouveau Stade de Bordeaux, Bordeaux, France	Serbia	4–0	6–0	2022 UEFA Women's Euro qualification
4	22 September 2020	Toše Proeski Arena, Skopje, North Macedonia	North Macedonia	3–0	7–0	2022 UEFA Women's Euro qualification
5	22 September 2020	Toše Proeski Arena, Skopje, North Macedonia	North Macedonia	4–0	7–0	2022 UEFA Women's Euro qualification
6	27 November 2020	Stade de Roudourou, Guingamp, France	Austria	2–0	3–0	2022 UEFA Women's Euro qualification
7	27 November 2020	Stade de Roudourou, Guingamp, France	Austria	3–0	3–0	2022 UEFA Women's Euro qualification
8	1 December 2020	Stade de la Rabine, Vannes, France	Kazakhstan	3–0	12–0	2022 UEFA Women's Euro qualification
9	1 December 2020	Stade de la Rabine, Vannes, France	Kazakhstan	4–0	12–0	2022 UEFA Women's Euro qualification
10	9 April 2021	Stade Michel d'Ornano, Caen, France	United States	3–1	3–1	Friendly
11	17 September 2021	Pampeloponnisiako Stadium, Patras, Greece	Greece	3–0	10–0	2023 FIFA Women's World Cup qualification
12	17 September 2021	Pampeloponnisiako Stadium, Patras, Greece	Greece	4–0	10–0	2023 FIFA Women's World Cup qualification
13	17 September 2021	Pampeloponnisiako Stadium, Patras, Greece	Greece	8–0	10–0	2023 FIFA Women's World Cup qualification
14	21 September 2021	Fazanerija City Stadium, Murska Sobota, Slovenia	Slovenia	1–1	3–2	2023 FIFA Women's World Cup qualification
15	21 September 2021	Fazanerija City Stadium, Murska Sobota, Slovenia	Slovenia	2–1	3–2	2023 FIFA Women's World Cup qualification
16	22 October 2021	Stade Dominique Duvauchelle, Créteil, France	Estonia	2–0	11–0	2023 FIFA Women's World Cup qualification
17	26 October 2021	Astana Arena, Nur-Sultan, Kazakhstan	Kazakhstan	1–0	5–0	2023 FIFA Women's World Cup qualification
18	26 October 2021	Astana Arena, Nur-Sultan, Kazakhstan	Kazakhstan	3–0	5–0	2023 FIFA Women's World Cup qualification
19	26 November 2021	Stade de la Rabine, Vannes, France	Kazakhstan	3–0	6–0	2023 FIFA Women's World Cup qualification
20	19 February 2022	Stade Michel d'Ornano, Caen, France	Brazil	1–1	2–1	2022 Tournoi de France
21	19 February 2022	Stade Michel d'Ornano, Caen, France	Brazil	2–1	2–1	2022 Tournoi de France
22	22 February 2022	Stade Océane, Le Havre, France	Netherlands	2–0	3–1	2022 Tournoi de France
23	22 February 2022	Stade Océane, Le Havre, France	Netherlands	3–1	3–1	2022 Tournoi de France
24	8 April 2022	Parc y Scarlets, Llanelli, Wales	Wales	2–0	2–1	2023 FIFA Women's World Cup qualification
25	1 July 2022	Stade de la Source, Orléans, France	Vietnam	4–0	7–0	Friendly
26	10 July 2022	New York Stadium, Rotherham, England	Italy	2–0	5–1	UEFA Women's Euro 2022
27	1 December 2023	Roazhon Park, Rennes, France	Austria	3–0	3–0	2023–24 UEFA Women's Nations League
28	5 April 2024	Stade Saint-Symphorien, Metz, France	Republic of Ireland	1–0	1–0	2025 UEFA Women's Euro qualification
29	31 May 2024	St James' Park, Newcastle, England	England	2–1	2–1	2025 UEFA Women's Euro qualification
30	12 July 2024	Stade Gaston Gérard, Dijon, France	Sweden	2–1	2–1	2025 UEFA Women's Euro qualification
31	25 July 2024	Parc Olympique Lyonnais, Décines-Charpieu, France	Colombia	1–0	3–2	2024 Summer Olympics
32	25 July 2024	Parc Olympique Lyonnais, Décines-Charpieu, France	Colombia	3–0	3–2	2024 Summer Olympics
33	28 July 2024	Stade Geoffroy-Guichard, Saint-Étienne, France	Canada	1–0	1–2	2024 Summer Olympics
34	31 July 2024	Parc Olympique Lyonnais, Décines-Charpieu, France	New Zealand	1–0	2–1	2024 Summer Olympics
35	31 July 2024	Parc Olympique Lyonnais, Décines-Charpieu, France	New Zealand	2–1	2–1	2024 Summer Olympics
36	21 February 2025	Stadium de Toulouse, Toulouse, France	Norway	1–0	1–0	2025 UEFA Women's Nations League
37	25 February 2025	Stade Marie-Marvingt, Le Mans, France	Iceland	2–0	3–2	2025 UEFA Women's Nations League
38	27 June 2025	Stade des Alpes, Grenoble, France	Brazil	3–2	3–2	Friendly
39	5 July 2025	Letzigrund, Zurich, Switzerland	England	1–0	2–1	UEFA Women's Euro 2025
40	13 July 2025	St. Jakob-Park, Basel, Switzerland	Netherlands	2–2	5–2	UEFA Women's Euro 2025
41	7 March 2026	Stade Gaston Gérard, Dijon, France	Poland	1–0	4–1	2027 FIFA World Cup qualification
42	7 March 2026	Stade Gaston Gérard, Dijon, France	Poland	2–1	4–1	2027 FIFA World Cup qualification
43	18 April 2026	Stade de l'Abbé-Deschamps, Auxerre, France	Netherlands	1–0	1–1	2027 FIFA World Cup qualification
44	10 October 2026	Stade Francis Le Basser, Laval, France	Latvia	9–0	9–0	Friendly

== Honours ==
Paris Saint-Germain

- Première Ligue: 2020–21
- Coupe de France Féminine: 2017–18, 2021–22, 2023–24
- UEFA Women's Champions League runner-up: 2014–15, 2016–17

Lyon

- Première Ligue: 2025–26
- Coupe de France Féminine: 2025–26
- Coupe LFFP: 2025–26
- UEFA Women's Champions League runner-up: 2025–26

France U19

- UEFA Women's Under-19 Championship: 2016

France

- UEFA Women's Nations League runner-up: 2023–24

Individual

- UEFA Women's Under-19 Championship player of the tournament: 2016
- UEFA Women's Champions League team of the season: 2021–22
- UEFA Women's Under-19 Championship team of the tournament: 2016
- UEFA Women's Under-19 Championship top goalscorer: 2016
- UNFP Première Ligue player of the year: 2021–22
- LFFP Première Ligue best player: 2021–22
- UNFP Première Ligue young player of the year: 2017–18, 2018–19
- LFFP Première Ligue best young player: 2017–18, 2018–19
- UNFP Première Ligue team of the year: 2020–21, 2021–22
- LFFP Première Ligue team of the season: 2017–18, 2018–19, 2020–21, 2021–22
- Summer Olympics top goalscorer: 2024
- Première Ligue top goalscorer: 2018–19, 2019–20, 2021–22
- Coupe de France Féminine top goalscorer: 2021–22, 2025–26
- Première Ligue Player of the Month: November 2020, December 2020, January 2022
