= 2016–17 Paris Saint-Germain FC (women) season =

Paris Saint-Germain Féminine
2016–17 season
- Owner: Qatar Sports Investments
- President: Nasser Al-Khelaifi
- Head coach: Patrice Lair
- Stadium: Stade Sébastien Charléty; Stade Municipal Georges Lefèvre; Parc des Princes
- Division 1 Féminine: 3rd
- Coupe de France Féminine: Runners-up
- UEFA Women's Champions League: Runners-up
- Top goalscorer: League: Marie-Laure Delie (16); All: Marie-Laure Delie (28)
- Highest home attendance: 19,192 vs Barcelona, UEFA Women's Champions League, 29 April 2017
- Biggest win: 19–0 vs. Bourges 18, Coupe de France, 8 January 2017
- Biggest defeat: 0–3 vs Lyon, Division 1 Féminine, 13 May 2017
Home colours	Away colours	Third colours

The 2016–17 season was the 46th season in the existence of Paris Saint-Germain Féminine and was the club's 30th season in the top flight of French football. In addition to the domestic league, they participated in the Coupe de France Féminine and the UEFA Women's Champions League.

Patrice Lair became the team's manager, replacing Farid Benstiti who left the job after four trophy less seasons with the club. A number of notable players also arrived ahead of the season with Irene Paredes joining from Athletic Bilbao, Aminata Diallo signing from Guingamp and Ève Périsset switching from rivals Lyon. The club also signed Ashley Lawrence a silver-medalist with West Virginia and a bronze-medalist with Canada. Academy product Sandy Baltimore who would become an important part of the PSG first-team in the seasons that followed also made her debut during this campaign.

== Competitions ==
=== Overall record ===
Competition	First match	Last match	Starting round	Final position	Record							
Competition	First match	Last match	Starting round	Final position	Pld	W	D	L	GF	GA	GD	Win %
Division 1 Féminine	10 September 2016	25 May 2017	Matchday 1	3rd	22	16	2	4	54	16	+38	72.73
Coupe de France Féminine	7 January 2018	31 May 2018	Round of 64	Runners-up	6	5	1	0	41	3	+38	83.33
UEFA Champions League	6 October 2016	1 June 2017	Round of 32	Runners-up	9	6	1	2	21	7	+14	66.67
Total					37	27	4	6	116	26	+90	72.97

Source: Soccerway
