= 2017–18 Paris Saint-Germain FC (women) season =

Paris Saint-Germain Féminine
2017–18 season
- Owner: Qatar Sports Investments
- President: Nasser Al-Khelaifi
- Head coach: Patrice Lair (until 27 May); Bernard Mendy (from 28 May)
- Stadium: Stade Jean-Bouin; Stade Municipal Georges Lefèvre
- Division 1 Féminine: 2nd
- Coupe de France Féminine: Winners
- Top goalscorer: League: Marie-Antoinette Katoto (21); All: Marie-Antoinette Katoto (26)
- Highest home attendance: 4,500 vs Marseille, Division 1 Féminine, 22 April 2018
- Lowest home attendance: 200 vs Paris FC, Division 1 Féminine, 12 March 2018
- Biggest win: 6–0 vs Rodez, Division 1 Féminine, 17 December 2017
- Biggest defeat: 0–3 vs Montpellier, Division 1 Féminine, 1 April 2018
Home colours	Away colours	Third colours

The 2017–18 season is the 47th season in the existence of Paris Saint-Germain Féminine and the club's 31st season in the top flight of French football. In addition to the domestic league, they participated in this season's edition of the Coupe de France Féminine. Despite reaching the previous season's final, PSG did not achieve a high enough league finish in 2016-17 to qualify for the UEFA Women's Champions League.

Despite again failing to beat Lyon to the domestic title, the season was marked by its unusual end as manager Patrice Lair left the club seventy-two hours before their Coupe de France final against Lyon to take the same position at Niort. Assistant manager and former PSG right-back Bernard Mendy took over an interim basis and helped the club secure their second major trophy in history by winning the Coupe de France for the first time since 2009-10. The winning goal was scored by Marie-Antoinette Katoto, a young French attacker. In addition to a first piece of silverware for eight seasons, PSG also secured a return qualification to the Champions League for the 2018–19 season as a result of their second place league finish.

== Competitions ==
=== Overall record ===
Competition	First match	Last match	Starting round	Final position	Record							
Competition	First match	Last match	Starting round	Final position	Pld	W	D	L	GF	GA	GD	Win %
Division 1 Féminine	3 September 2017	27 May 2018	Matchday 1	2nd	22	18	2	2	59	13	+46	81.82
Coupe de France Féminine	7 January 2018	31 May 2018	Round of 64	Winners	6	6	0	0	15	1	+14	100.00
Total					28	24	2	2	74	14	+60	85.71

Source: Soccerway

=== Division 1 Féminine ===
==== League table ====
Pos	Team	Pld	W	D	L	GF	GA	GD	Pts	Qualification or relegation
1	Lyon (C)	22	21	1	0	104	5	+99	64	Qualification for the Champions League Round of 32
2	Paris Saint-Germain	22	18	2	2	59	13	+46	56	Qualification for the Champions League Round of 32
3	Montpellier	22	17	2	3	63	22	+41	53	
4	Paris FC	22	8	6	8	31	37	−6	30	
5	Soyaux	22	6	6	10	18	36	−18	24	

Source: Soccerway FFF
Rules for classification: 1) points; 2) head-to-head; 3) head-to-head goal difference; 4) goal difference; 5) goals scored
(C) Champions

==== Results summary ====
Overall								Home						Away					
Pld	W	D	L	GF	GA	GD	Pts	W	D	L	GF	GA	GD	W	D	L	GF	GA	GD
22	18	2	2	59	13	+46	56	9	2	0	34	6	+28	9	0	2	25	7	+18

Source: FBRef

==== Results by round ====
Round	1	2	3	4	5	6	7	8	9	10	11	12	13	14	15	16	17	18	19	20	21	22
Ground	H	A	H	A	H	A	A	H	A	H	A	H	A	H	A	H	A	H	H	A	H	A
Result	D	W	W	W	W	W	W	W	W	W	L	W	W	W	W	W	L	W	W	W	D	W
Position	5	4	3	2	2	2	2	2	2	2	2	2	2	2	2	2	2	2	2	2	2	2

Source: FBRef
A = Away; H = Home; W = Win; D = Draw; L = Loss

=== Coupe de France ===
7 January 2018 Round of 64	Paris Saint-Germain	1-0	Lille	Saint-Germain-en-Laye
14:30 CET (UTC+2)	Katoto 74'			Stadium: Stade Municipal Georges Lefèvre

27 January 2018 Round of 32	Paris FC	0-2	Paris Saint-Germain	Bondoufle
14:30 CET (UTC+2)	Paredes 80'; Katoto 81'			Stadium: Stade Robert Bobin

25 March 2018 Round of 16	Paris Saint-Germain	5-1	Rodez	Saint-Germain-en-Laye
14:00 CEST (UTC+2)	Hermoso 12', 32'; Katoto 20'; Baltimore 60'; Delie 80'		Mabomba 46'	Stadium: Stade Municipal Georges Lefèvre

15 April 2018 Quarter-final	Saint-Étienne	0-3	Paris Saint-Germain	Saint-Étienne
15:00 CEST (UTC+2)			Delie 27'; Katoto 65'; Périsset 79' (pen.)	Stadium: Stade Léon Nautin

7 May 2018 Semi-final	Soyaux	0-3	Paris Saint-Germain	Soyaux
21:00 CEST (UTC+2)			Delie 54', 69'; Paredes 87'	Stadium: Stade Léo Lagrange

31 May 2018 Final	Lyon	0-1	Paris Saint-Germain	Strasbourg
21:00 CEST (UTC+2)			Katoto 16'	Stadium: La Meinau; Attendance: 12,480; Referee: Florence Guillemin
