= Magnaba Folquet =

French footballer (born 2003)

Personal information
- Full name: Magnaba Koné Folquet
- Date of birth: 2 November 2003 (age 22)
- Place of birth: Paris, France
- Height: 1.69 m (5 ft 7 in)
- Position: Midfielder

Team information
- Current team: Le Havre
- Number: 77

Youth career
- 2013–2014: FC Emerainville
- 2014–2018: US Torcy
- 2018–2022: Paris Saint-Germain

Senior career*
| Years | Team | Apps | (Gls) |
| 2021–2024 | Paris Saint-Germain | 25 | (2) |
| 2023 | → Fleury (loan) | 6 | (0) |
| 2024- | Le Havre | 0 | (0) |

International career^{‡}
| 2019–2020 | France U17 | 2 | (0) |
| 2021 | France U19 | 1 | (0) |
| 2022 | France U20 | 7 | (3) |
| 2023– | France U23 | 1 | (0) |
- * Club domestic league appearances and goals as of 1 July 2024 ‡ National team caps and goals as of 10 April 2023

Magnaba Koné Folquet (born 2 November 2003) is a French professional footballer who plays as a midfielder. She has also appeared for the France national team at various youth levels including most recently for the U20 team at the 2022 FIFA U-20 Women's World Cup.

== Early life ==
Folquet was born in the Paris region and began playing football at the age of 10 at FC Emerainville. Later, Folquet joined US Torcy a club known for its history of youth development in the men's game with Paul Pogba amongst the players who spent part of their academy career at the club. Finally, Folquet joined the Paris Saint-Germain academy at fifteen years old.

== Club career ==
An eventual youth academy graduate of Paris Saint-Germain, Folquet was selected for the PSG squad by coach Olivier Echouafni in each of the club's Champions League quarter-final and semi-final legs in the spring of 2021 but was an unused substitute. In the build-up to the 2021–22 season, Folquet was included as part of the first team squad by new coach Didier Ollé-Nicolle.

On 21 November 2021, Folquet made her senior competitive debut off the bench for PSG in a 7–0 win over Reims. Two weeks later, she started her first match for the first team and made her Champions League debut against Zhytlobud. On 13 April 2022, Folquet signed her first professional contract with PSG.

On 23 November 2022, Folquet scored her first professional goal against Vllaznia in the Champions League. Her second goal for the club was scored in the return fixture with Vllaznia two weeks later. On 30 January 2023, Folquet moved to Fleury on loan after making just six appearances for new coach Gérard Prêcheur in the first half of the 2022–23 season.

== International career ==
Folquet has been a French youth international at three different levels. Her first cap for the U17 side was against Japan on 5 December 2019. She graduated to the U19 team for a single appearance against Iceland in 2021 before making her U20 debut (in a friendly technically classed at the U23 level by FIFA) against Sweden on 8 April 2022.

In June 2022, Folquet was part of the squad that represented France at the Sud Ladies Cup where the team finished as runners-up. On 15 August 2022, Folquet scored her first goals for France's youth teams with a brace against Canada at the U-20 Women's World Cup in Costa Rica. She also scored in the knockout stages of the same tournament against Japan though France were eliminated in the quarterfinals by the Japanese. She finished as the tournament's joint-third leading scorer.

== Honours ==
Paris Saint-Germain

- Coupe de France: 2023–24
