= Amanda Ilestedt =

Swedish footballer (born 1993)

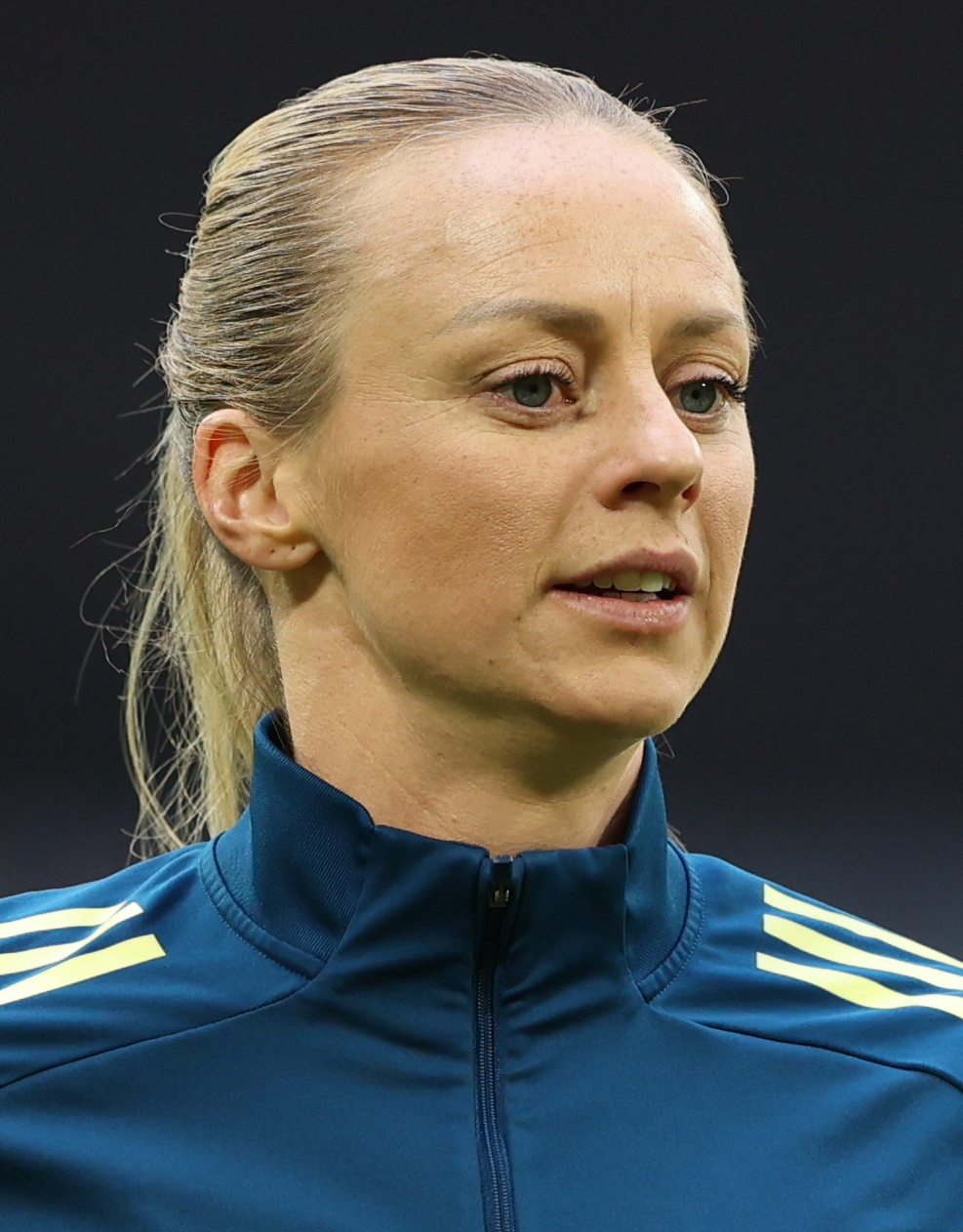
- Ilestedt with Sweden in 2026

Personal information
- Full name: Amanda Ilestedt
- Date of birth: 17 January 1993 (age 33)
- Place of birth: Sölvesborg, Sweden
- Height: 1.78 m (5 ft 10 in)
- Position: Centre-back

Team information
- Current team: Eintracht Frankfurt
- Number: 13

Youth career
- Sölvesborgs GoIF

Senior career*
| Years | Team | Apps | (Gls) |
| 2008–2009 | Karlskrona FF | 7 | (9) |
| 2009–2017 | FC Rosengård | 124 | (5) |
| 2011 | → Vittsjö GIK (loan) | 1 | (0) |
| 2017–2019 | Turbine Potsdam | 35 | (2) |
| 2019–2021 | Bayern Munich | 32 | (5) |
| 2021–2023 | Paris Saint-Germain | 30 | (1) |
| 2023–2025 | Arsenal | 15 | (1) |
| 2025– | Eintracht Frankfurt | 27 | (6) |

International career^{‡}
| 2009–2010 | Sweden U17 | 16 | (1) |
| 2010–2012 | Sweden U19 | 32 | (2) |
| 2012–2014 | Sweden U23 | 2 | (0) |
| 2013– | Sweden | 84 | (15) |
Medal record
Women's football
Representing Sweden
Olympic Games
| Silver medal – second place | 2020 Tokyo | Team |
FIFA Women's World Cup
| Third place | 2019 France |
| Third place | 2023 Australia-New Zealand |
UEFA Women's Under-19 Championship
| Winner | 2012 Turkey |
- * Club domestic league appearances and goals as of 21 November 2026 ‡ National team caps and goals as of 14 October 2026

Amanda Ilestedt (Swedish: [aˈmânːda ˈîːlɛˌstɛt]; born 17 January 1993) is a Swedish professional footballer who plays as a defender for Frauen-Bundesliga club Eintracht Frankfurt and the Sweden national team.

== Club career ==
=== Early career ===
Ilestedt started playing football in her hometwon with Sölvesborgs GIF and moved up to their first team in 2006. After one season, she signed with Karlskrona FF in 2007.

=== FC Rosengård ===
In 2009 she moved to LdB FC Malmö (now known as FC Rosengård) in the Damallsvenskan, initially playing for the B team. She broke into the first team in 2010, playing ten league games and winning the Damallsvenskan league title.

In August 2011, was loaned to the second division club Vittsjö GIK for the 2011–12 season.

Rosengård reached the quarter-finals of the 2014–15 Champions League, in which they were elimated by defending champions VfL Wolfsburg due to the away goals rule.

=== Turbine Potsdam ===
In June 2017, Ilestedt joined Frauen-Bundesliga club Turbine Potsdam on a two-year deal.

=== Bayern Munich ===
In May 2019, she moved to fellow German side Bayern Munich, signing a contract until June 2021. She made her debut for Bayern on 17 August 2019 in a 3-1 away win against SC Freiburg.

On 6 December 2019, also against Freiburg, she scored her first goal for Bayern. She scored four goals from 18 league matches in 2020–21 season, helping the club to win their first league title in five years.

=== Paris Saint-Germain ===
On 12 July 2021 Ilestedt joined Première Ligue club Paris Saint-Germain on a two-year deal. On 17 June 2023 PSG announced she would leave at the end of her contract.

=== Arsenal ===
On 27 June 2023, Ilestedt signed with Women's Super League club Arsenal. She scored her first goal for Arsenal on 23 November 2023 in a Conti Cup match against Southampton, a 92nd minute winner for Arsenal.

In March 2024, Ilestedt announced that she was expecting her first child. Her daughter was born in August 2024 and Ilestedt returned to training with the team in December.

On 29 January 2025, Ilestedt returned to the team, coming on in the 79th minute to help secure a 5–0 victory over Bristol City in Arsenal's FA Cup campaign. She also made appearances with Arsenal's under-21 team to increase her game time. In May, it was announced that Ilestedt would leave Arsenal at the expiration of her contract that season. With Arsenal, she won the Women's Champions League.

=== Eintracht Frankfurt ===
On 1 August 2025, Ilestedt returned to the Frauen-Bundesliga, signing with Eintracht Frankfurt on a three year contract. She made her debut and scored her first goal for the club on 5 September 2025.

== International career ==
=== Youth ===
Ilestedt was called up to the under-17 national team in 2009, during qualification for the 2010 Under-17 European Championship. Sweden were eliminated in the second qualification round following defeat to the Republic of Ireland.

In 2012 she won the Under-19 European Championship with the U19 national team, of which she was captain.

=== Senior ===
Ilestedt made her senior debut for Sweden in a 4–1 win over England in a European Championship preparation game on 4 July 2013. Coach Pia Sundhage named Ilestedt to the Sweden squad for Euro 2013.

In May 2015, she was selected for Sweden's team ahead of the 2015 World Cup. She was used in all four games, but the team was eliminated in the round of 16 against by Germany.

On 16 May, she was called up for the 2019 World Cup. Sweden finished as group runners-up to eventual champions USA and, in the quarter-finals, beat Germany for the first time in 24 years, qualifying for the 2020 Olympic Football Tournament. She was used as a 72nd minute substitute in the third place match against England, which Sweden won 2–1.

She was called up to national team squad for the 2020 Olympics (held in 2021 due to COVID-19 postponement). During the tournament, in which Sweden won the silver medal, she was used in all games.

Ilestedt was named in Sweden's squad for the 2022 European Championship in England, which was also postponed by a year due to the COVID-19 pandemic. Following a 4–0 defeat to hosts (and eventual champions) England, the Swedes were eliminated in the semi-finals.

On 23 July 2023, Ilestedt was included in the 23-player squad for the 2023 World Cup. Her late goal gave Sweden the win in their opening match against South Africa; it was her first goal at a senior World Cup. On 29 July 2023, she scored two goals (known as a 'brace') in Sweden's 2nd group stage match against Italy. She scored her 4th goal of the World Cup on 11 August 2023 in the quarter-final win against Japan. Following defeat to eventual champions Spain, Sweden beat co-hosts Australia to secure third-place at the tournament. Ilestedt was her country's top scorer in the tournament, just one goal behind Golden Boot winner Hinata Miyazawa. She received the tournament's Bronze Ball, an honour given to the tournament's third-best player, and was also nominated for the 2023 Ballon d'Or Fémenin.

Following the birth of her daughter in August 2024, Ilestedt received her first call-up in over a year in March 2025, ahead of Sweden's Nations League matches against Italy and Wales.

Ilestedt was again called up to the national team for the 2025 European Championship. Sweden were eliminated in the quarter-finals on penalties, once more to England (who would again win the tournament); Ilestedt was an unused substitute.

== Style of play ==
Ilestedt is renowned for her heading technique. Three of her four 2023 World Cup goals were headers. Her Arsenal fan chant included the line: "It's Amanda Ilestedt - Better in the air than Ryanair or Easyjet."

== Personal life ==
Oliver Ekman-Larsson of the National Hockey League is Ilestedt's cousin. Their grandfather is ice hockey player Kenneth Ekman and their first cousins, twice removed are cyclists, the Fåglum brothers. Her great uncle is ice hockey player Sven Tumba.

On 13 March 2024, Ilestedt announced her first pregnancy with her partner Rainer Müller. On 30 August 2024, she gave birth to a baby girl.

== Career statistics ==
=== Club ===
As of match played 21 November 2026

Appearances and goals by club, season and competition
| Club | Season | League | | | National Cup (Note: Includes Svenska Cupen, DFB-Pokal Frauen, Coupe de France Féminine, Trophée des Championnes, Women's FA Cup) | | League Cup (Note: Includes FA Women's League Cup) | | Europe (Note: Includes UEFA Women's Champions League, UEFA Women's Europa Cup) | | Other | | Total | |
| Club | Season | Division | Apps | Goals | Apps | Goals | Apps | Goals | Apps | Goals | Apps | Goals | Apps | Goals |
|---|---|---|---|---|---|---|---|---|---|---|---|---|---|---|
| Karlskrona FF | 2008 | Div 2 Sydöstra Götaland | 1 | 1 | 0 | 0 | – | | – | | – | | 1 | 1 |
| Karlskrona FF | 2009 | Div 2 Sydöstra Götaland | 6 | 8 | 0 | 0 | – | | – | | – | | 6 | 8 |
| Karlskrona FF | Total | | 7 | 9 | 0 | 0 | – | | – | | – | | 7 | 9 |
| Rosengård | 2010 | Damallsvenskan | 15 | 0 | 1 | 0 | – | | – | | – | | 16 | 0 |
| Rosengård | 2011 | Damallsvenskan | 2 | 0 | 1 | 0 | – | | 0 | 0 | – | | 3 | 0 |
| Rosengård | 2012 | Damallsvenskan | 18 | 2 | 2 | 0 | – | | 2 | 0 | – | | 22 | 2 |
| Rosengård | 2013 | Damallsvenskan | 20 | 0 | 2 | 0 | – | | 4 | 0 | – | | 26 | 0 |
| Rosengård | 2014 | Damallsvenskan | 20 | 1 | 5 | 1 | – | | 4 | 0 | – | | 29 | 2 |
| Rosengård | 2015 | Damallsvenskan | 22 | 0 | 1 | 0 | – | | 6 | 0 | – | | 29 | 0 |
| Rosengård | 2016 | Damallsvenskan | 16 | 2 | 2 | 0 | – | | 4 | 1 | – | | 22 | 3 |
| Rosengård | 2017 | Damallsvenskan | 11 | 0 | 3 | 0 | – | | 6 | 0 | – | | 20 | 0 |
| Rosengård | Total | | 124 | 5 | 17 | 1 | – | | 26 | 1 | – | | 167 | 7 |
| Vittsjö GIK (loan) | 2011 | Söderettan | 1 | 0 | 0 | 0 | – | | – | | – | | 1 | 0 |
| Turbine Potsdam | 2017–18 | Frauen-Bundesliga | 22 | 2 | 3 | 0 | – | | – | | – | | 25 | 2 |
| Turbine Potsdam | 2018–19 | Frauen-Bundesliga | 13 | 0 | 2 | 0 | – | | – | | – | | 15 | 0 |
| Turbine Potsdam | Total | | 35 | 2 | 5 | 0 | – | | – | | – | | 40 | 2 |
| Bayern Munich | 2019–20 | Frauen-Bundesliga | 14 | 1 | 1 | 0 | – | | 2 | 0 | – | | 17 | 1 |
| Bayern Munich | 2020–21 | Frauen-Bundesliga | 18 | 4 | 3 | 0 | – | | 8 | 0 | – | | 29 | 4 |
| Bayern Munich | Total | | 32 | 5 | 4 | 0 | – | | 10 | 0 | – | | 46 | 5 |
| Paris Saint-Germain | 2021–22 | D1 Féminine | 15 | 1 | 2 | 0 | – | | 9 | 1 | – | | 26 | 2 |
| Paris Saint-Germain | 2022–23 | D1 Féminine | 15 | 0 | 2 | 1 | – | | 7 | 0 | 1 | 0 | 25 | 1 |
| Paris Saint-Germain | Total | | 30 | 1 | 4 | 1 | – | | 16 | 1 | 1 | 0 | 51 | 3 |
| Arsenal | 2023–24 | Women's Super League | 12 | 1 | 1 | 1 | 2 | 1 | 2 | 0 | – | | 17 | 3 |
| Arsenal | 2024–25 | Women's Super League | 3 | 0 | 3 | 0 | 0 | 0 | 0 | 0 | – | | 6 | 0 |
| Arsenal | Total | | 15 | 1 | 4 | 1 | 2 | 1 | 2 | 0 | – | | 23 | 3 |
| Eintracht Frankfurt | 2025–26 | Frauen-Bundesliga | 16 | 4 | 0 | 0 | – | | 5 | 1 (Note: Two appearances in UEFA Women's Champions League qualifying rounds and three appearances and one goal in UEFA Women's Europa Cup) | – | | 21 | 5 |
| Eintracht Frankfurt | 2026–27 | Frauen-Bundesliga | 11 | 2 | 2 | 1 | – | | 6 | 1 (Note: Three appearances in UEFA Women's Champions League qualifying rounds and three appearances and a Goal in the UEFA Women's Europa Cup) | – | | 19 | 4 |
| | Total | | 27 | 6 | 2 | 1 | – | | 11 | 2 | – | | 40 | 9 |
| Career Total | | | 270 | 30 | 36 | 2 | 2 | 1 | 65 | 4 | 1 | 0 | 374 | 38 |

=== International ===
As of match played 13 October 2026

Appearances and goals by national team and year
| National team | Year | Apps | Goals |
|---|---|---|---|
| Sweden | 2013 | 2 | 1 |
| Sweden | 2014 | 4 | 0 |
| Sweden | 2015 | 5 | 0 |
| Sweden | 2016 | 3 | 1 |
| Sweden | 2017 | 1 | 0 |
| Sweden | 2018 | 4 | 0 |
| Sweden | 2019 | 11 | 1 |
| Sweden | 2020 | 7 | 1 |
| Sweden | 2021 | 14 | 1 |
| Sweden | 2022 | 12 | 3 |
| Sweden | 2023 | 12 | 4 |
| Sweden | 2025 | 10 | 0 |
| Sweden | 2026 | 6 | 3 |
| Total | | 84 | 15 |

Scores and results list Sweden's goal tally first, score column indicates score after each Ilestedt goal.

List of international goals scored by Amanda Ilestedt
| No. | Date | Venue | Opponent | Score | Result | Competition |
|---|---|---|---|---|---|---|
| 1 | 31 October 2013 | Gamla Ullevi, Gothenburg, Sweden | Faroe Islands | 2–0 | 5–0 | 2015 FIFA Women's World Cup qualification |
| 2 | 2 June 2016 | Stadion Miejski ŁKS, Łódź, Poland | Poland | 1–0 | 4–0 | UEFA Women's Euro 2017 qualifying |
| 3 | 3 September 2019 | Daugava Stadium, Liepāja, Latvia | Latvia | 2–1 | 4–1 | UEFA Women's Euro 2022 qualifying |
| 4 | 17 September 2020 | Gamla Ullevi, Gothenburg, Sweden | Hungary | 6–0 | 8–0 | UEFA Women's Euro 2022 qualifying |
| 5 | 30 November 2021 | Stadion, Malmö, Sweden | Slovakia | 3–0 | 3–0 | 2023 FIFA Women's World Cup qualification |
| 6 | 20 February 2022 | Estádio Algarve, Algarve, Portugal | Portugal | 2–0 | 4–0 | 2022 Algarve Cup |
| 7 | 7 April 2022 | Tengiz Burjanadze Stadium, Gori, Georgia | Georgia | 6–0 | 15–0 | 2023 FIFA Women's World Cup qualification |
| 8 | 11 October 2022 | Gamla Ullevi, Gothenburg, Sweden | France | 2–0 | 3–0 | Friendly |
| 9 | 23 July 2023 | Wellington Regional Stadium, Wellington, New Zealand | South Africa | 2–1 | 2–1 | 2023 FIFA Women's World Cup |
| 10 | 29 July 2023 | Wellington Regional Stadium, Wellington, New Zealand | Italy | 1–0 | 5–0 | 2023 FIFA Women's World Cup |
| 11 | 29 July 2023 | Wellington Regional Stadium, Wellington, New Zealand | Italy | 4–0 | 5–0 | 2023 FIFA Women's World Cup |
| 12 | 11 August 2023 | Eden Park, Auckland, New Zealand | Japan | 1–0 | 2–1 | 2023 FIFA Women's World Cup |
| 13 | 9 October 2026 | Darius and Girėnas Stadium, Kaunas, Lithuania | Lithuania | 5–0 | 5–0 | 2027 FIFA Women's World Cup play-offs |
| 14 | 13 October 2026 | Nationalarenan, Solna, Sweden | Lithuania | 8–0 | 10–0 | 2027 FIFA Women's World Cup play-offs |
| 15 | 13 October 2026 | Nationalarenan, Solna, Sweden | Lithuania | 10–0 | 10–0 | 2027 FIFA Women's World Cup play-offs |

== Honours ==
LdB FC Malmö / Rosengård

- Damallsvenskan: 2010, 2011, 2013, 2014
- Svenska Supercupen: 2011, 2012, 2015

FC Bayern Munich

- Frauen-Bundesliga: 2020–21

Paris Saint-Germain

- Coupe de France féminine: 2021–22

Arsenal

- UEFA Women's Champions League: 2024–25

Sweden U19

- UEFA Women's Under-19 Championship: 2012

Sweden

- Summer Olympic Games Silver Medal: 2016
- FIFA Women's World Cup third place: 2019, 2023
- Algarve Cup: 2018

Individual

- FIFA Women's World Cup Bronze Ball: 2023
- IFFHS Women's World Team of the Year: 2023
