= 2019–20 Division 1 Féminine =

46th season of the top women's football / soccer league in France

Division 1 Féminine
- Season: 2019–20
- Dates: 24 August 2019 – 28 April 2020
- Champions: Lyon (14th title)
- Relegated: Marseille; Metz
- Champions League: Lyon; Paris Saint-Germain
- Matches: 96
- Goals: 318 (3.31 per match)
- Top goalscorer: Marie-Antoinette Katoto (16 goals)
- Biggest home win: Paris Saint-Germain 11–0 Marseille (18 January 2020)
- Biggest away win: Marseille 0–8 Lyon (8 February 2020)
- Highest scoring: Reims 3–8 Lyon (7 September 2019); Paris Saint-Germain 11–0 Marseille (18 January 2020)
- Longest winning run: Paris Saint-Germain (7 matches)
- Longest unbeaten run: Lyon (16 matches)
- Longest winless run: Metz (16 matches)
- Longest losing run: Metz; Marseille (11 matches)
- Highest attendance: 30,661; Lyon 1–0 Paris Saint-Germain (16 November 2019)
- Lowest attendance: 126; Marseille 0–3 Montpellier (16 November 2019)
- Total attendance: 104,071
- Average attendance: 1,084

The 2019–20 Division 1 Féminine season, also known as D1 Arkema for sponsorship reasons, was the 46th edition of Division 1 Féminine since its establishment in 1974. The season began on 24 August 2019 and was scheduled to end on 30 May 2020. Lyon were the defending champions, having won the title for last thirteen consecutive seasons. This was the first ever season with a title sponsor for the league, after FFF announced a three-year deal with French chemicals firm Arkema.

After 16 match days, the season was abandoned due to the COVID-19 pandemic in France. Lyon were declared champions, and Paris joined them in qualification for the 2020–21 UEFA Women's Champions League.

== Teams ==
Location of teams in 2019–20 Division 1 Féminine

A total of 12 teams compete in the league. Champions and runners-up of previous season's Division 2 Féminine replaced two relegated teams from last season's Division 1 Féminine. Reims and Marseille replaced Rodez and Lille this season.

== Results ==
=== League table ===
The final standings after the abandonment were:

Pos	Team	Pld	W	D	L	GF	GA	GD	Pts	Qualification or relegation
1	Lyon (C)	16	14	2	0	67	4	+63	44	Qualification for the Champions League Round of 32
2	Paris Saint-Germain	16	13	2	1	60	7	+53	41	Qualification for the Champions League Round of 32
3	Bordeaux	16	12	1	3	36	12	+24	37	
4	Montpellier	16	9	3	4	39	18	+21	30	
5	Paris FC	16	7	3	6	21	26	−5	24	
6	Guingamp	16	6	5	5	20	21	−1	23	
7	Fleury	16	6	2	8	18	30	−12	20	
8	Reims	16	4	3	9	13	32	−19	15	
9	Dijon	16	3	5	8	10	32	−22	14	
10	Soyaux	16	4	4	8	15	30	−15	13 (Note: 3 points deduction (sanctioned by DNCG).)	
11	Marseille (R)	16	2	0	14	12	62	−50	6	Relegation to Division 2 Féminine
12	Metz (R)	16	0	2	14	7	44	−37	2	Relegation to Division 2 Féminine

Rules for classification: 1) points; 2) head-to-head points; 3) head-to-head goal difference; 4) goal difference; 5) goals scored
(C) Champions; (R) Relegated

=== Positions by round ===
The table lists the positions of teams after each week of matches. In order to preserve chronological evolvements, any postponed matches are not included to the round at which they were originally scheduled, but added to the full round they were played immediately afterwards.

Team ╲ Round	1	2	3	4	5	6	7	8	9	10	11	12	13	14	15	16
Bordeaux	3	3	3	3	4	4	4	4	4	3	3	3	3	3	3	3
Dijon	7	10	11	12	12	11	11	10	10	9	9	10	10	10	10	9
Fleury	10	9	12	8	10	9	8	7	6	5	7	7	8	8	8	7
Guingamp	5	7	9	10	7	6	6	8	9	6	5	5	5	5	5	6
Lyon	2	2	1	1	1	2	2	1	1	1	1	1	1	1	1	1
Marseille	11	6	8	9	8	8	10	11	11	11	11	11	11	11	11	11
Metz	8	12	10	11	11	12	12	12	12	12	12	12	12	12	12	12
Montpellier	6	4	4	4	3	3	3	3	3	4	4	4	4	4	4	4
Paris FC	4	5	5	5	5	7	7	5	5	7	6	6	6	6	6	5
PSG	1	1	2	2	2	1	1	2	2	2	2	2	2	2	2	2
Reims	9	11	7	7	9	10	9	9	8	8	10	9	9	9	9	8
Soyaux	12	8	6	6	6	5	5	6	7	10	8	8	7	7	7	10

Leader and Champions League Round of 32
Champions League Round of 32
Relegation to Division 2 Féminine

== Season statistics ==
=== Top scorers ===
Rank	Player	Club	Goals
1	(France) Marie-Antoinette Katoto	Paris Saint-Germain	16
2	(Norway) Ada Hegerberg	Lyon	14
3	(France) Viviane Asseyi	Bordeaux	12
3	(France) Kadidiatou Diani	Paris Saint-Germain	12
5	(Germany) Dzsenifer Marozsán	Lyon	10
5	(Jamaica) Khadija Shaw	Bordeaux	10
7	(Germany) Lena Petermann	Montpellier	9
8	(France) Valérie Gauvin	Montpellier	8
8	(Denmark) Nadia Nadim	Paris Saint-Germain	8
8	(England) Nikita Parris	Lyon	8

=== Most clean sheets ===
Rank	Player	Club	Clean sheets
1	(France) Sarah Bouhaddi	Lyon	14
2	(France) Romane Bruneau	Bordeaux	7
3	(Chile) Christiane Endler	Paris Saint-Germain	6
4	(France) Solène Durand	Guingamp	5
4	(United States) Phallon Tullis-Joyce	Reims	5
6	(Poland) Katarzyna Kiedrzynek	Paris Saint-Germain	4
7	(France) Romane Munich	Soyaux	3
7	(Brazil) Natascha Honegger	Paris FC	3
7	(New Zealand) Erin Nayler	Bordeaux	3
7	(France) Cindy Perrault	Montpellier	3
7	(Germany) Lisa Schmitz	Montpellier	3

=== Hat-tricks ===
Player	Club	Against	Result	Date
(France) Kadidiatou Diani^{4}	Paris Saint-Germain	Metz	6–1 (A)	7 September 2019
(Norway) Ada Hegerberg	Lyon	Reims	8–3 (A)	7 September 2019
(France) Valérie Gauvin	Montpellier	Paris FC	5–2 (A)	26 October 2019
(Norway) Ada Hegerberg	Lyon	Metz	6–0 (H)	8 December 2019
(France) Kadidiatou Diani	Paris Saint-Germain	Marseille	11–0 (H)	18 January 2020
(France) Marie-Antoinette Katoto	Paris Saint-Germain	Marseille	11–0 (H)	18 January 2020
(France) Marie-Antoinette Katoto	Paris Saint-Germain	Metz	5–1 (H)	25 January 2020

- ^{4} Player scored four goals.
