= Kadidiatou Diani =

French footballer (born 1995)

- Diani in 2026

Personal information
- Full name: Kadidiatou Diani
- Date of birth: 1 April 1995 (age 31)
- Place of birth: Ivry-sur-Seine, France
- Height: 1.68 m (5 ft 6 in)
- Position: Forward

Team information
- Current team: London City Lionesses
- Number: 21

Youth career
- 2005–2007: ES Vitry
- 2007–2010: US Ivry
- 2010–2014: Paris FC

Senior career*
Years	Team	Apps	(Gls)
2011–2017	Paris FC	73	(22)
2017–2023	Paris Saint-Germain	114	(74)
2023–2026	Lyon	49	(20)
2026–	London City Lionesses	0	(0)

International career^{‡}
2010–2012	France U17	31	(12)
2013–2014	France U19	19	(7)
2014	France U20	5	(1)
2014–	France	127	(33)
Medal record
Women's football
Representing France
UEFA Women's Nations League
Runner-up	2024
- * Club domestic league appearances and goals as of 12:11, 15 July 2026 (UTC) ‡ National team caps and goals as of 10 October 2026

Kadidiatou Diani (born 1 April 1995) is a French professional footballer who plays as a forward for Women's Super League club London City Lionesses and the France national team.

== Club career ==
=== OL Lyonnes ===
On 2 August 2023, Diani was announced at Lyon on a four-year contract. A month later, on 27 September, an investigation was opened against her former coach Didier Ollé-Nicolle, with Diani accusing him of sexual assault.

=== London City Lionesses ===
On 15 July 2026, Diani joined Women's Super League club London City Lionesses on a three-year deal, the Lionesses are the first fully independent team to be promoted to the top women's league. Both London City Lionesses and her former club Lyon are owned by businesswoman Michelle Kang. The transfer fee was reported to be £500,000.

== International career ==
Diani has played for France at several youth levels, including in the 2012 FIFA U-17 Women's World Cup, where she scored four goals and helped her side winning the championship. She also played in the 2014 FIFA U-20 Women's World Cup, scoring one goal against New Zealand and helping France to finish in the third place.

Diani was called up to the France squad for the UEFA Women's Euro 2017.

Diani was called up to the France squad for the 2019 FIFA Women's World Cup.

On 30 May 2022, Diani was called up to the France squad for the UEFA Women's Euro 2022.

On 24 February 2023, she announced she would no longer play for the national team after captain Wendie Renard said she would step down to save her mental health. Diani said she wanted changes to be made to the way the team was managed.

Diani was called up to the France squad for the 2023 FIFA Women's World Cup. On 2 August 2023, she scored a hat-trick in a 6–3 victory over Panama in the 2023 FIFA Women's World Cup last group stage match.

In July 2024, Diani was named in France's squad for the 2024 Olympics.

== Personal life ==
Diani was born in Ivry-sur-Seine, France on 1 April 1995, and is of Malian descent.

Her "adviser", César Mavacala, was a suspect in the Hamraoui case. In February 2022, she caused a controversy with Marie-Antoinette Katoto for her support to Aminata Diallo during a goal celebration for France.

== Career statistics ==
=== Club ===
As of match played 30 March 2023

Appearances and goals by club, season and competition
Club	Season	League			Coupe de France		Continental		Other		Total	
Club	Season	Division	Apps	Goals	Apps	Goals	Apps	Goals	Apps	Goals	Apps	Goals
Juvisy	2010–11	D1F	3	0	1	1	0	0	—		4	1
Juvisy	2011–12	D1F	2	0	0	0	—		—		2	0
Juvisy	2012–13	D1F	7	1	1	0	5 (Note: Appearances in UEFA Women's Champions League)	1	—		13	2
Juvisy	2013–14	D1F	6	1	1	0	—		—		7	1
Juvisy	2014–15	D1F	17	3	2	1	—		—		19	4
Juvisy	2015–16	D1F	20	10	3	5	—		—		23	15
Juvisy	2016–17	D1F	18	7	3	0	—		—		21	7
Juvisy	Total		73	22	11	7	5	1	0	0	89	30
Paris Saint-Germain	2017–18	D1F	22	6	6	0	—		—		28	6
Paris Saint-Germain	2018–19	D1F	22	13	3	1	5	2	—		30	16
Paris Saint-Germain	2019–20	D1F	16	12	4	0	4	2	1 (Note: Appearance(s) in Trophée des Championnes)	0	25	14
Paris Saint-Germain	2020–21	D1F	19	13	1	0	4	1	—		24	14
Paris Saint-Germain	2021–22	D1F	18	13	4	2	9	1	—		31	16
Paris Saint-Germain	2022–23	D1F	17	17	3	3	9	6	1	0	30	26
Paris Saint-Germain	Total		114	74	21	6	31	12	2	0	168	92
Lyon	2023–24	D1F	18	7	3	3	11	8	1	0	33	18
Lyon	2024–25	D1F	19	10	1	0	10	6	—		30	16
Lyon	Total		37	17	4	3	21	14	1	0	63	34
Career total			224	113	36	16	57	27	3	0	320	156

=== International ===
As of match played 10 October 2026

Appearances and goals by national team and year
National team	Year	Apps	Goals
France	2014	1	1
France	2015	7	0
France	2016	12	1
France	2017	14	0
France	2018	8	2
France	2019	12	6
France	2020	6	3
France	2021	7	3
France	2022	13	6
France	2023	14	4
France	2024	15	3
France	2025	13	2
France	2026	5	2
Total		127	33

Scores and results list France's goal tally first, score column indicates score after each Diani goal.

List of international goals scored by Kadidiatou Diani
No.	Date	Venue	Opponent	Score	Result	Competition
1	22 November 2014	Stade Francis Le Basser, Laval, France	New Zealand	2–0	2–1	Friendly
2	16 July 2016	Stade Sébastien Charléty, Paris, France	China	1–0	3–0	Friendly
3	1 September 2018	Stade de la Licorne, Amiens, France	Mexico	1–0	4–0	Friendly
4	9 October 2018	Stade des Alpes, Grenoble, France	Cameroon	2–0	6–0	Friendly
5	19 January 2019	Stade Océane, Le Havre, France	United States	1–0	3–1	Friendly
6	19 January 2019	Stade Océane, Le Havre, France	United States	2–0	3–1	Friendly
7	4 April 2019	Stade de l'Abbé-Deschamps, Auxerre, France	Japan	3–1	3–1	Friendly
8	25 May 2019	Stade de la Source, Orléans, France	Thailand	2–0	3–0	Friendly
9	25 May 2019	Stade de la Source, Orléans, France	Thailand	3–0	3–0	Friendly
10	31 May 2019	Stade Dominique Duvauchelle, Créteil, France	China	2–1	2–1	Friendly
11	23 October 2020	Stade de la Source, Orléans, France	North Macedonia	5–0	11–0	2022 UEFA Women's Euro qualification
12	1 December 2020	Stade de la Rabine, Vannes, France	Kazakhstan	2–0	12–0	2022 UEFA Women's Euro qualification
13	1 December 2020	Stade de la Rabine, Vannes, France	Kazakhstan	5–0	12–0	2022 UEFA Women's Euro qualification
14	17 September 2021	Pampeloponnisiako Stadium, Patras, Greece	Greece	6–0	10–0	2023 FIFA Women's World Cup qualification
15	22 October 2021	Stade Dominique Duvauchelle, Créteil, France	Estonia	7–0	11–0	2023 FIFA Women's World Cup qualification
16	30 November 2021	Stade de Roudourou, Guingamp, France	Wales	1–0	2–0	2023 FIFA Women's World Cup qualification
17	1 July 2022	Stade de la Source, Orléans, France	Vietnam	2–0	7–0	Friendly
18	1 July 2022	Stade de la Source, Orléans, France	Vietnam	6–0	7–0	Friendly
19	14 July 2022	New York Stadium, Rotherham, England	Belgium	1–0	2–1	UEFA Women's Euro 2022
20	6 September 2022	Stade Louis Dugauguez, Sedan, France	Greece	2–0	5–1	2023 FIFA Women's World Cup qualification
21	6 September 2022	Stade Louis Dugauguez, Sedan, France	Greece	4–1	5–1	2023 FIFA Women's World Cup qualification
22	11 November 2022	Estadi Olímpic Camilo Cano, La Nucia, Spain	Norway	1–0	2–1	Friendly
23	2 August 2023	Sydney Football Stadium, Sydney, Australia	Panama	2–1	6–3	2023 FIFA Women's World Cup
24	2 August 2023	Sydney Football Stadium, Sydney, Australia	Panama	3–1	6–3	2023 FIFA Women's World Cup
25	2 August 2023	Sydney Football Stadium, Sydney, Australia	Panama	5–1	6–3	2023 FIFA Women's World Cup
26	8 August 2023	Hindmarsh Stadium, Adelaide, Australia	Morocco	1–0	4–0	2023 FIFA Women's World Cup
27	23 February 2024	Parc Olympique Lyonnais, Décines-Charpieu, France	Germany	1–0	2–1	2023–24 UEFA Women's Nations League
28	4 June 2024	Stade Geoffroy-Guichard, Saint-Étienne, France	England	1–2	1–2	UEFA Women's Euro 2025 qualifying
29	3 December 2024	Stade de Nice, Le Mans, France	Spain	2–3	2–4	Friendly
30	25 February 2025	Stade Marie-Marvingt, Le Mans, France	Iceland	1–0	3–2	2025 UEFA Women's Nations League
31	9 July 2025	Kybunpark, St. Gallen, Switzerland	Wales	2–1	4–1	UEFA Women's Euro 2025
32	7 March 2026	Stade Gaston Gérard, Dijon, France	Poland	4–1	4–1	2027 FIFA World Cup qualification
33	10 October 2026	Stade Francis Le Basser, Laval, France	Latvia	1–0	9–0	Friendly

== Honours ==
Paris Saint-Germain

- Division 1 Féminine: 2020–21
- Coupe de France féminine: 2017–18, 2021–22

France

- SheBelieves Cup: 2017

Individual

- Division 1 Féminine Player of the Year: 2020–21
- UNFP Première Ligue team of the year: 2020–21, 2021–22, 2022–23, 2024–25
- LFFP Première Ligue team of the season: 2020–21, 2021–22, 2022–23
- FIFA Women's World Cup Silver Boot: 2023
- UEFA Women's Champions League top scorer: 2023–24
- UEFA Women's Champions League Team of the Season: 2023–24
