= 2021–22 Division 1 Féminine =

48th season of top French women's football league

Division 1 Féminine
- Season: 2021–22
- Dates: 27 August 2021 – 1 June 2022
- Champions: Lyon (15th title)
- Relegated: Saint-Étienne; Issy
- Champions League: Lyon; Paris Saint-Germain; Paris FC
- Matches: 132
- Goals: 427 (3.23 per match)
- Top goalscorer: Marie-Antoinette Katoto (18 goals)
- Biggest home win: Lyon 8–0 Soyaux (11 February 2022)
- Biggest away win: Issy 0–5 Paris FC (30 October 2021); Soyaux 1–6 Lyon (31 October 2021); Saint-Étienne 0–5 Paris Saint-Germain (23 January 2022); Issy 0–5 Fleury (7 May 2022)
- Highest scoring: Fleury 6–2 Guingamp (20 November 2021); Guingamp 2–6 Paris Saint-Germain (5 February 2022); Lyon 8–0 Soyaux (11 February 2022)
- Longest winning run: Lyon (15 matches)
- Longest unbeaten run: Lyon (22 matches)
- Longest winless run: Saint-Étienne (18 matches)
- Longest losing run: Issy (8 matches)

The 2021–22 Division 1 Féminine season, also known as D1 Arkema for sponsorship reasons, was the 48th edition of Division 1 Féminine since its establishment in 1974. The season began on 27 August 2021 and ended on 1 June 2022. Paris Saint-Germain were the defending champions, having won their first ever league title in 2020–21 season.

On 29 May 2022, Lyon won their record-extending 15th title following a 1–0 win against Paris Saint-Germain.

== Teams ==
Location of teams in 2021–22 Division 1 Féminine

A total of 12 teams compete in the league. Saint-Étienne replaced Le Havre, who were relegated to Division 2 Féminine at the end of last season.

Team	Manager	Ground	Capacity	2020–21 season
Bordeaux	(France) Patrice Lair	Stade Sainte-Germaine, Le Bouscat	7,000	3rd
Dijon	(France) Christophe Forest	Stade des Poussots, Dijon	498	8th
Fleury	(France) Fabrice Abriel	Stade Walter Felder, Fleury-Mérogis	1,000	9th
Guingamp	(France) Frédéric Biancalani	Stade de l'Akademi EA Guingamp, Pabu	1,960	5th
Lyon	(France) Sonia Bompastor	Groupama OL Training Center, Décines-Charpieu	1,524	2nd
Issy	(France) Camillo Vaz	Stade Le Gallo, Boulogne-Billancourt	2,000	11th
Montpellier	(France) Yannick Chandioux	Stade Bernard Gasset - Mama Ouattara Field, Montpellier	1,280	7th
Paris FC	(France) Sandrine Soubeyrand	Stade Robert Bobin, Bondoufle	18,845	4th
Paris Saint-Germain	(France) Didier Ollé-Nicolle	Stade Municipal Georges Lefèvre, Saint-Germain-en-Laye	2,164	1st
Reims	(France) Amandine Miquel	Stade Louis Blériot, Bétheny	500	6th
Saint-Étienne	(France) Jérôme Bonnet	Stade Salif Keïta, Saint-Étienne	1,000	D2F Group B, 1st
Soyaux	(Serbia) Dragan Cvetković	Stade Léo Lagrange, Soyaux	385	10th

== League table ==
Pos	Team	Pld	W	D	L	GF	GA	GD	Pts	Qualification or relegation
1	Lyon (C)	22	21	1	0	79	8	+71	64	Qualification for the Champions League group stage
2	Paris Saint-Germain	22	17	2	3	68	12	+56	53	Qualification for the Champions League second round
3	Paris FC	22	16	2	4	49	21	+28	50	Qualification for the Champions League first round
4	Fleury	22	14	1	7	36	26	+10	43	
5	Montpellier	22	11	2	9	38	25	+13	35	
6	Bordeaux	22	11	2	9	38	29	+9	35	
7	Reims	22	10	3	9	29	38	−9	33	
8	Guingamp	22	4	5	13	23	57	−34	17	
9	Soyaux	22	5	1	16	18	55	−37	16	
10	Dijon	22	3	6	13	13	45	−32	15	
11	Issy (R)	22	4	1	17	19	57	−38	13	Relegation to Division 2 Féminine
12	Saint-Étienne (R)	22	1	4	17	17	54	−37	7	Relegation to Division 2 Féminine

Source: Division 1 Féminine
Rules for classification: 1) points; 2) head-to-head points; 3) head-to-head goal difference; 4) goal difference; 5) goals scored
(C) Champions; (R) Relegated

== Results ==
Home \ Away	BOR	DIJ	FLE	GUI	ISY	LYO	MON	PFC	PSG	REI	SET	SOY
Bordeaux	—	1–1	1–2	3–0	3–0	1–4	0–1	1–4	1–5	3–1	3–0	6–0
Dijon	0–2	—	0–0	1–1	0–1	0–3	1–2	0–2	0–3	2–2	0–4	0–1
Fleury	2–0	0–1	—	6–2	1–0	1–2	1–0	0–1	0–4	1–0	4–2	1–0
Guingamp	0–2	4–0	0–3	—	1–1	0–2	2–1	2–5	2–6	0–1	1–1	2–2
Issy	0–1	0–2	0–5	0–2	—	0–4	2–5	0–5	0–3	1–3	4–1	5–1
Lyon	1–0	6–0	4–0	4–0	4–0	—	5–0	2–0	6–1	3–0	6–0	8–0
Montpellier	0–1	2–0	1–2	6–0	3–0	2–3	—	0–0	0–1	1–2	3–0	3–0
Paris FC	1–3	2–0	3–1	4–1	1–0	1–2	3–1	—	0–0	3–0	2–1	4–0
PSG	1–0	5–0	5–0	6–0	6–1	0–1	0–0	4–0	—	7–0	2–0	2–0
Reims	5–2	1–1	0–1	0–0	4–3	0–2	1–4	1–2	1–0	—	1–0	3–1
Saint-Étienne	1–1	2–2	0–4	1–3	0–1	1–1	1–2	1–3	0–5	0–1	—	0–3
Soyaux	0–3	1–2	0–1	2–0	2–0	1–6	0–1	1–3	0–2	1–2	2–1	—

Source: Division 1 Féminine
Legend: Blue = home team win; Yellow = draw; Red = away team win.
For upcoming matches, an "a" indicates there is an article about the rivalry between the two participants.

=== Positions by round ===
The table lists the positions of teams after each week of matches. In order to preserve chronological evolvements, any postponed matches are not included to the round at which they were originally scheduled, but added to the full round they were played immediately afterwards.

Team ╲ Round	1	2	3	4	5	6	7	8	9	10	11	12	13	14	15	16	17	18	19	20	21	22
Bordeaux	6	4	4	4	5	7	5	5	6	6	7	6	6	6	6							
Dijon	8	6	7	10	7	4	7	7	7	8	8	8	8	8	8							
Fleury	12	12	10	6	4	5	4	4	4	4	4	4	4	4	4							
Guingamp	10	8	5	8	8	9	9	9	10	10	9	9	9	9	9							
Issy	9	11	9	11	12	10	10	11	11	12	12	12	12	12	11							
Lyon	3	1	1	1	1	1	1	1	1	1	1	1	1	1	1	1						
Montpellier	5	5	6	5	6	8	6	6	5	5	5	5	5	5	5							
Paris FC	2	3	3	3	3	3	3	3	3	3	3	3	3	3	3	3						
PSG	1	2	2	2	2	2	2	2	2	2	2	2	2	2	2	2						
Reims	11	9	11	12	9	6	8	8	8	7	6	7	7	7	7	7						
Saint-Étienne	7	10	12	7	10	11	11	12	12	11	11	11	11	11	12							
Soyaux	4	7	8	9	11	12	12	10	9	9	10	10	10	10	10							

Leader and UEFA Champions League group stage
UEFA Champions League second round
UEFA Champions League first round
Relegation to 2022–23 Division 2 Féminine

Updated to match(es) played on 27 February 2022. Source: Division 1

== Season statistics ==
=== Top scorers ===
Rank	Player	Club	Goals
1	(France) Marie-Antoinette Katoto	Paris Saint-Germain	18
2	(United States) Catarina Macario	Lyon	14
3	(France) Kadidiatou Diani	Paris Saint-Germain	13
3	(France) Melvine Malard	Lyon	13
5	(France) Clara Matéo	Paris FC	11
6	(Norway) Ada Hegerberg	Lyon	10
6	(Germany) Lena Petermann	Montpellier	10
6	(Netherlands) Katja Snoeijs	Bordeaux	10
9	(Poland) Nikola Karczewska	Fleury	9
10	(Germany) Sara Däbritz	Paris Saint-Germain	8
10	(France) Ouleymata Sarr	Paris FC	8

=== Most clean sheets ===
Rank	Player	Club	Clean sheets
1	(Chile) Christiane Endler	Lyon	10
2	(Nigeria) Chiamaka Nnadozie	Paris FC	9
2	(Czech Republic) Barbora Votíková	Paris Saint-Germain	9
4	(Finland) Katriina Talaslahti	Fleury	7
5	(Mexico) Emily Alvarado	Reims	5
5	(Canada) Gabrielle Lambert	Montpellier	5
5	(France) Emmeline Mainguy	Fleury	5
8	(France) Mylène Chavas	Bordeaux	4
8	(France) Romane Munich	Soyaux	4
8	(France) Cindy Perrault	Guingamp	4
8	(Germany) Lisa Schmitz	Montpellier	4
8	(Germany) Charlotte Voll	Paris Saint-Germain	4

=== Hat-tricks ===
Player	Club	Against	Result	Date
(Denmark) Signe Bruun	Lyon	Dijon	6–0 (H)	12 September 2021
(France) Marie-Antoinette Katoto	Paris Saint-Germain	Guingamp	6–0 (H)	10 October 2021
(Netherlands) Katja Snoeijs	Bordeaux	Reims	3–1 (H)	22 January 2022
(France) Marie-Antoinette Katoto	Paris Saint-Germain	Saint-Étienne	5–0 (A)	23 January 2022
(Norway) Ada Hegerberg	Lyon	Soyaux	8–0 (H)	11 February 2022
(France) Kadidiatou Diani	Paris Saint-Germain	Bordeaux	5–1 (A)	7 May 2022
(Poland) Nikola Karczewska	Fleury	Saint-Étienne	4–2 (H)	28 May 2022

== Awards ==
=== Player of the Month ===
Month	Winner	Club	Ref.
September 2021	(Germany) Sara Däbritz	Paris Saint-Germain	
October 2021	(France) Selma Bacha	Lyon	
November 2021	(France) Selma Bacha	Lyon	
December 2021	(France) Sakina Karchaoui	Paris Saint-Germain	
January 2022	(France) Marie-Antoinette Katoto	Paris Saint-Germain	
February 2022	(France) Clara Matéo	Paris FC	
March 2022	(Ivory Coast) Rosemonde Kouassi	Fleury	
April 2022	(United States) Catarina Macario	Lyon	
May 2022	(Ivory Coast) Rosemonde Kouassi	Fleury	

=== UNFP Awards ===
Nominations were announced on 3 May 2022. Winners along with the Team of the Year were announced on 15 May.

Note: Winners are displayed in boldface.

==== Player of the Year ====
Player	Club
(France) Kadidiatou Diani	Paris Saint-Germain
(France) Grace Geyoro	Paris Saint-Germain
(France) **Marie-Antoinette Katoto**	**Paris Saint-Germain**
(United States) Catarina Macario	Lyon
(France) Clara Matéo	Paris FC

==== Young Player of the Year ====
Player	Club
(France) Kessya Bussy	Reims
(Haiti) Melchie Dumornay	Reims
(France) **Laurina Fazer**	**Paris Saint-Germain**
(France) Naomie Feller	Reims
(France) Louna Ribadeira	Paris FC

==== Goalkeeper of the Year ====
Player	Club
(France) Mylène Chavas	Bordeaux
(Chile) **Christiane Endler**	**Lyon**
(United States) Cosette Morché	Issy
(Nigeria) Chiamaka Nnadozie	Paris FC
(Czech Republic) Barbora Votíková	Paris Saint-Germain

==== Team of the Year ====
Position	Player	Club
GK	(Chile) Christiane Endler	Lyon
DF	(Canada) Ashley Lawrence	Paris Saint-Germain
DF	(France) Wendie Renard	Lyon
DF	(Poland) Paulina Dudek	Paris Saint-Germain
DF	(France) Sakina Karchaoui	Paris Saint-Germain
MF	(United States) Catarina Macario	Lyon
MF	(France) Grace Geyoro	Paris Saint-Germain
MF	(Germany) Sara Däbritz	Paris Saint-Germain
FW	(France) Kadidiatou Diani	Paris Saint-Germain
FW	(France) Marie-Antoinette Katoto	Paris Saint-Germain
FW	(France) Clara Matéo	Paris FC

=== FFF D1 Arkema Awards ===
Nominations for the Goal of the Season were announced on 12 May 2022. Other nominations were announced on 18 May. Winners along with Team of the Season were announced on 23 May.

Note: Winners are displayed in boldface.

==== Best Player ====
Player	Club
(France) **Marie-Antoinette Katoto**	**Paris Saint-Germain**
(United States) Catarina Macario	Lyon
(France) Clara Matéo	Paris FC

==== Best Young Player ====
Player	Club
(Haiti) Melchie Dumornay	Reims
(France) Laurina Fazer	Paris Saint-Germain
(Ivory Coast) **Rosemonde Kouassi**	**Fleury**

==== Best Goalkeeper ====
Player	Club
(Chile) **Christiane Endler**	**Lyon**
(United States) Cosette Morché	Issy
(Nigeria) Chiamaka Nnadozie	Paris FC

==== Best Manager ====
Manager	Club
(France) Fabrice Abriel	Fleury
(France) Sonia Bompastor	Lyon
(France) **Sandrine Soubeyrand**	**Paris FC**

==== Goal of the Season ====
Player	Club
(Canada) Kadeisha Buchanan	Lyon
(Germany) Sara Däbritz	Paris Saint-Germain
(Haiti) **Batcheba Louis**	**Issy**
(France) Julie Soyer	Paris FC

==== Team of the Season ====
Position	Player	Club
GK	(Chile) Christiane Endler	Lyon
DF	(Australia) Ellie Carpenter	Lyon
DF	(France) Wendie Renard	Lyon
DF	(Poland) Paulina Dudek	Paris Saint-Germain
DF	(France) Sakina Karchaoui	Paris Saint-Germain
MF	(France) Clara Matéo	Paris FC
MF	(France) Grace Geyoro	Paris Saint-Germain
MF	(France) Selma Bacha	Lyon
FW	(France) Kadidiatou Diani	Paris Saint-Germain
FW	(France) Marie-Antoinette Katoto	Paris Saint-Germain
FW	(Ivory Coast) Rosemonde Kouassi	Fleury
