= Sandy Baltimore =

French footballer (born 2000)

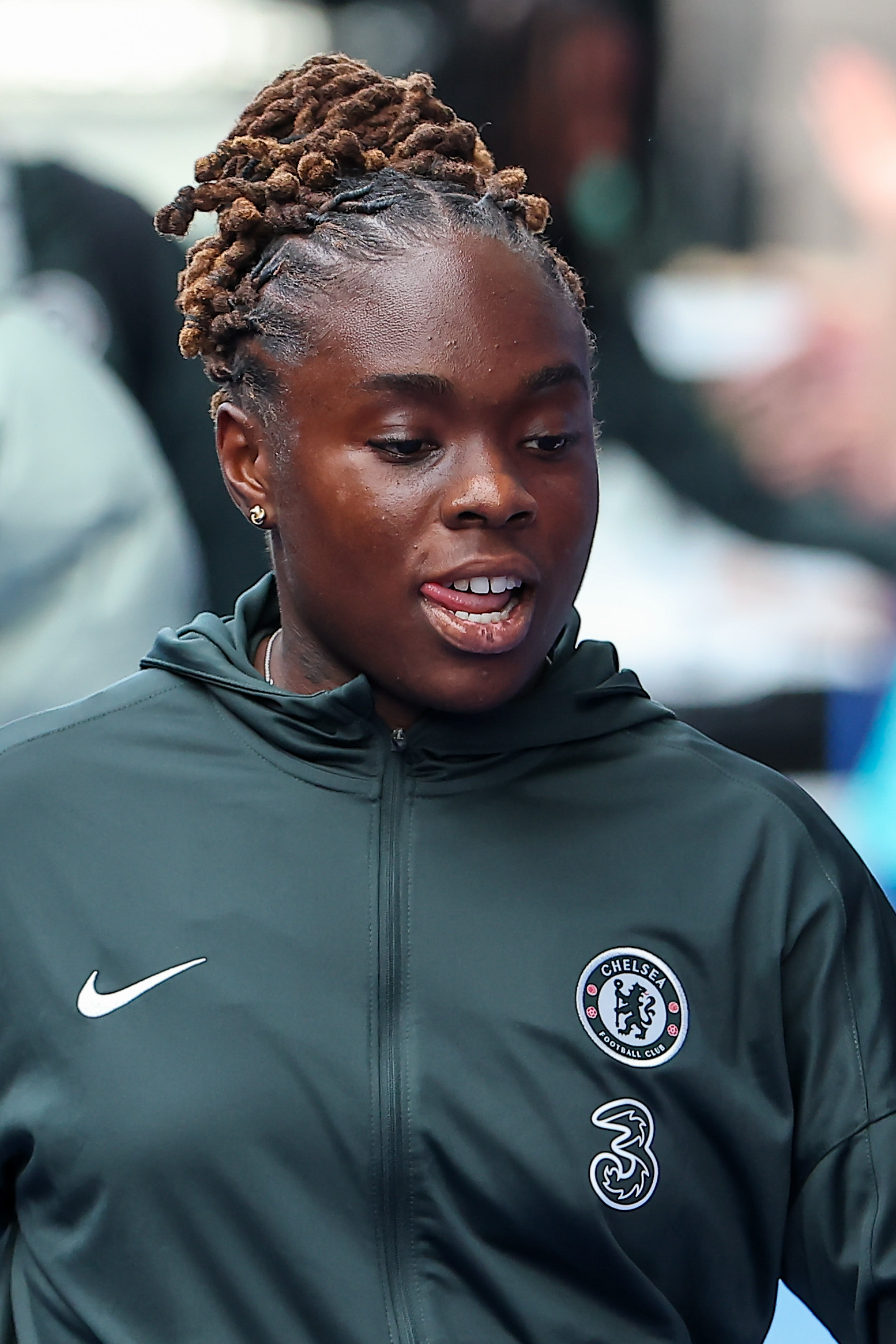
- Baltimore in 2025

Personal information
- Full name: Sandy Madeleine Baltimore
- Date of birth: 19 February 2000 (age 26)
- Place of birth: Colombes, France
- Height: 1.56 m (5 ft 1 in)
- Positions: Left winger; left-back

Team information
- Current team: Chelsea
- Number: 11

Youth career
- 2010–2015: CC de Tavarney
- 2015–2016: Paris Saint-Germain

Senior career*
| Years | Team | Apps | (Gls) |
| 2016–2024 | Paris Saint-Germain | 111 | (30) |
| 2024– | Chelsea | 46 | (10) |

International career^{‡}
| 2017 | France U17 | 10 | (0) |
| 2018–2019 | France U19 | 18 | (3) |
| 2017–2020 | France U20 | 15 | (2) |
| 2020– | France | 58 | (12) |
Medal record
Women's football
Representing France
UEFA Women's Nations League
| Runner-up | 2024 |
| Third place | 2025 |
UEFA Women's Under-19 Championship
| Winner | 2019 Scotland |
- * Club domestic league appearances and goals as of 21 November 2026 ‡ National team caps and goals as of 10 October 2026

Sandy Madeleine Baltimore (French: [sɑ̃di madlɛn baltimɔʁ]; born 19 February 2000) is a French professional footballer who plays as a left winger or left-back for Women's Super League club Chelsea and the France national team.

== Early life ==
Baltimore began playing football at the age of 10. She is of Guadeloupean origin.

== Club career ==
=== Paris Saint-Germain ===
A youth academy graduate of Paris Saint-Germain, Baltimore made her senior team debut on 9 October 2016, replacing Hawa Cissoko in a 3–0 league win against Metz. In April 2018, she scored a brace in her team's 4–0 win against Marseille. It was just Baltimore's eighth league match, and her fourth start, for PSG during the 2017–18 season. She signed her first professional contract with PSG at the end of the season, after helping the club win the 2017–18 Coupe de France.

After scoring eight goals and providing ten assists during the 2020–21 season, Baltimore was named the Division 1 Féminine's top prospect by UNFP. On 27 April 2022, she signed a contract extension with the club until June 2024.

=== Chelsea ===
On 5 July 2024, Baltimore joined Women's Super League club Chelsea on a four-year deal. During the 2025 Women's FA Cup final on 18 May, Baltimore scored a brace and assisted a third goal in a 3–0 victory for Chelsea, completing an unbeaten domestic treble.

== International career ==
Baltimore is a former French youth international and was part of the team which won the 2019 UEFA Women's Under-19 Championship. She scored a goal in the final against Germany to help her team win their fifth title in the tournament's history.

On 1 December 2020, Baltimore made her senior team debut in a 12–0 win against Kazakhstan. She replaced Amel Majri at the 46th minute of the game and went on to score a goal.

On 30 May 2022, Baltimore was called up to the France squad for the UEFA Women's Euro 2022. In July 2024, she was named in France's squad for the 2024 Olympics. In June 2025, she was named in the squad for the UEFA Women's Euro 2025.

== Personal life ==
In 2023, Baltimore was accused and convicted of assaulting an ex-partner.

== Career statistics ==
=== Club ===
As of match played 21 November 2026

Appearances and goals by club, season and competition
| Club | Season | League | | | National cup (Note: Includes Coupe de France Féminine, Women's FA Cup) | | League cup (Note: Includes FA Women's League Cup) | | Continental | | Other | | Total | |
| Club | Season | Division | Apps | Goals | Apps | Goals | Apps | Goals | Apps | Goals | Apps | Goals | Apps | Goals |
|---|---|---|---|---|---|---|---|---|---|---|---|---|---|---|
| Paris Saint-Germain | 2016–17 | D1F | 1 | 0 | 0 | 0 | — | | 1 (Note: Appearance(s) in UEFA Women's Champions League) | 0 | — | | 2 | 0 |
| Paris Saint-Germain | 2017–18 | D1F | 9 | 1 | 5 | 1 | — | | — | | — | | 14 | 2 |
| Paris Saint-Germain | 2018–19 | D1F | 12 | 1 | 2 | 2 | — | | 2 | 0 | — | | 16 | 3 |
| Paris Saint-Germain | 2019–20 | D1F | 9 | 4 | 5 | 1 | — | | 5 | 0 | 0 | 0 | 19 | 5 |
| Paris Saint-Germain | 2020–21 | D1F | 21 | 8 | 1 | 0 | — | | 6 | 1 | — | | 28 | 9 |
| Paris Saint-Germain | 2021–22 | D1F | 22 | 4 | 5 | 1 | — | | 10 | 3 | — | | 37 | 8 |
| Paris Saint-Germain | 2022–23 | D1F | 21 | 5 | 4 | 0 | — | | 8 | 1 | 1 (Note: Appearance in Trophée des Championnes) | 0 | 34 | 6 |
| Paris Saint-Germain | 2023–24 | D1F | 16 | 7 | 4 | 1 | — | | 11 | 1 | 3 (Note: Two appearances in playoffs, one appearance in Trophée des Championnes) | 0 | 34 | 9 |
| Paris Saint-Germain | Total | | 111 | 30 | 26 | 6 | 0 | 0 | 43 | 6 | 4 | 0 | 184 | 42 |
| Chelsea | 2024–25 | WSL | 15 | 4 | 5 | 3 | 1 | 0 | 8 | 2 | — | | 29 | 9 |
| Chelsea | 2025–26 | WSL | 21 | 3 | 3 | 0 | 2 | 0 | 8 | 2 | — | | 34 | 5 |
| Chelsea | 2026–27 | WSL | 10 | 3 | 0 | 0 | — | | 6 | 0 | — | | 16 | 3 |
| Chelsea | Total | | 46 | 10 | 8 | 3 | 3 | 0 | 22 | 4 | 0 | 0 | 79 | 17 |
| Career total | | | 157 | 40 | 34 | 9 | 3 | 0 | 65 | 10 | 4 | 0 | 263 | 59 |

=== International ===
As of match played 10 October 2026

Appearances and goals by national team and year
| National team | Year | Apps | Goals |
|---|---|---|---|
| France | 2020 | 1 | 1 |
| France | 2021 | 7 | 1 |
| France | 2022 | 11 | 1 |
| France | 2023 | 6 | 0 |
| France | 2024 | 11 | 1 |
| France | 2025 | 15 | 6 |
| France | 2026 | 7 | 2 |
| Total | | 58 | 12 |

Scores and results list France's goal tally first, score column indicates score after each Baltimore goal.

List of international goals scored by Sandy Baltimore
| No. | Date | Venue | Opponent | Score | Result | Competition |
|---|---|---|---|---|---|---|
| 1 | 1 December 2020 | Stade de la Rabine, Vannes, France | Kazakhstan | 11–0 | 12–0 | 2022 UEFA Women's Euro qualification |
| 2 | 9 April 2021 | Stade Michel d'Ornano, Caen, France | England | 1–0 | 3–1 | Friendly |
| 3 | 6 September 2022 | Stade Louis Dugauguez, Sedan, France | Greece | 5–1 | 5–1 | 2023 FIFA Women's World Cup qualification |
| 4 | 25 October 2024 | Stade Auguste-Bonal, Montbéliard, France | Jamaica | 3–0 | 3–0 | Friendly |
| 5 | 25 February 2025 | Stade Marie-Marvingt, Le Mans, France | Iceland | 3–1 | 3–2 | 2025 UEFA Women's Nations League |
| 6 | 4 April 2025 | Kybunpark, St. Gallen, Switzerland | Switzerland | 1–0 | 2–0 | 2025 UEFA Women's Nations League |
| 7 | 8 April 2025 | Ullevaal Stadion, Oslo, Norway | Norway | 1–0 | 2–0 | 2025 UEFA Women's Nations League |
| 8 | 30 May 2025 | Stade Marcel Picot, Tomblaine, France | Switzerland | 3–0 | 4–0 | 2025 UEFA Women's Nations League |
| 9 | 3 June 2025 | Laugardalsvöllur, Reykjavík, Iceland | Iceland | 1–0 | 2–0 | 2025 UEFA Women's Nations League |
| 10 | 5 July 2025 | Letzigrund, Zurich, Switzerland | England | 2–0 | 2–1 | UEFA Women's Euro 2025 |
| 11 | 14 April 2026 | Rat Verlegh Stadion, Breda, Netherlands | Netherlands | 1–2 | 1–2 | 2027 FIFA Women's World Cup qualification |
| 12 | 5 June 2026 | Gdańsk Stadium, Gdańsk, Poland | Poland | 2–0 | 2–0 | 2027 FIFA Women's World Cup qualification |

== Honours ==
Paris Saint-Germain

- Première Ligue: 2020–21
- Coupe de France Féminine: 2017–18, 2021–22, 2023–24
- UEFA Women's Champions League runner-up: 2016–17

Chelsea

- Women's Super League: 2024–25
- Women's FA Cup: 2024–25
- FA Women's League Cup: 2024–25, 2025–26

France U19

- UEFA Women's Under-19 Championship: 2019

France

- UEFA Women's Nations League runner-up: 2023–24

Individual

- UEFA Women's Under-19 Championship team of the tournament: 2019
- UNFP Division 1 Féminine young player of the year: 2020–21
- UNFP Division 1 Féminine team of the year: 2020–21
- LFFP Première Ligue young player of the year: 2020–21
- LFFP Première Ligue team of the year: 2020–21
- UEFA Women's Champions League Team of the Season: 2024–25
