= Aminata Diallo =

French footballer (born 1995)

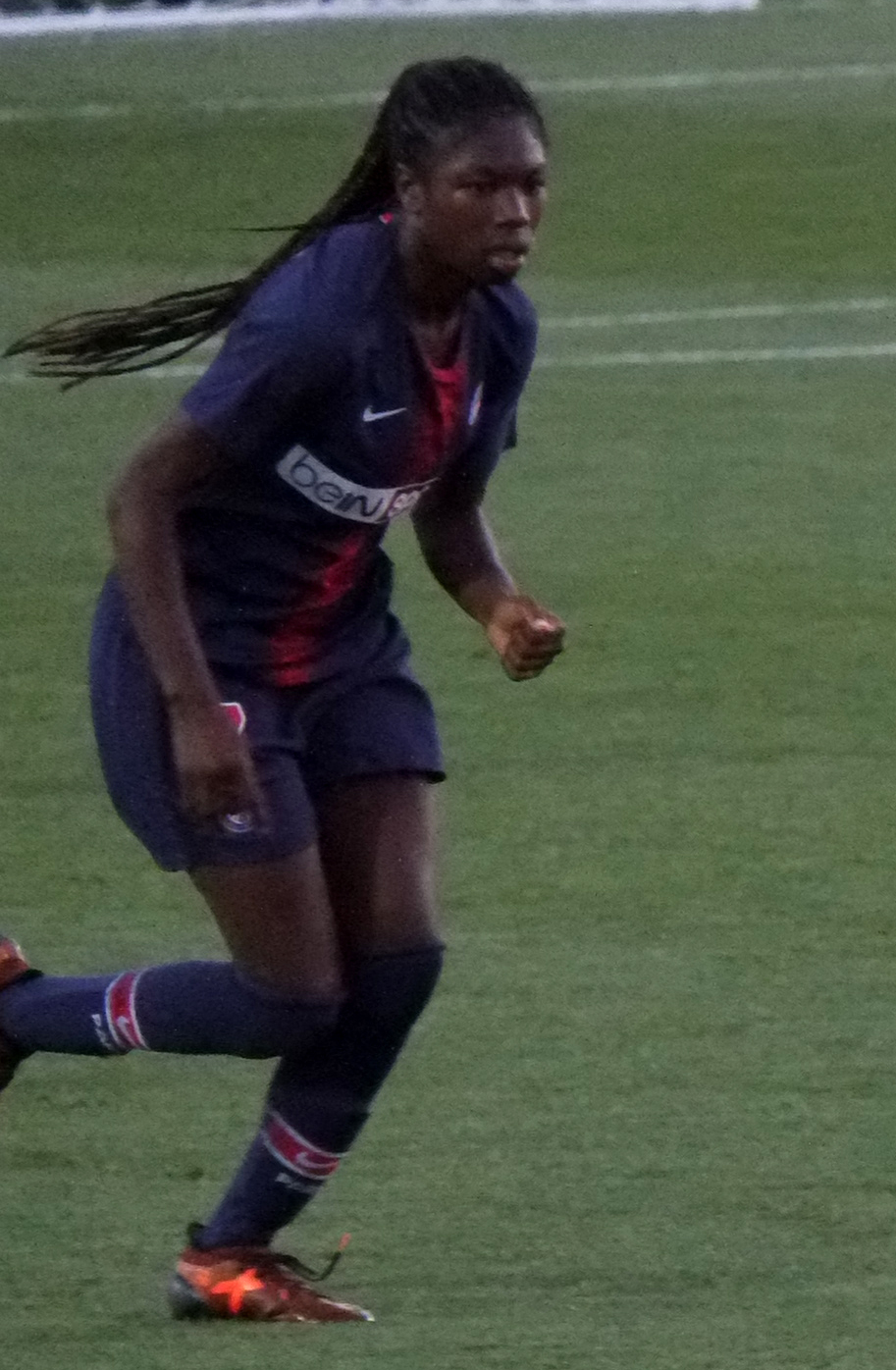
- Diallo with PSG in 2018

Personal information
- Full name: Aminata Fatou Diallo
- Date of birth: 3 April 1995 (age 31)
- Place of birth: Grenoble, France
- Height: 1.63 m (5 ft 4 in)
- Position: Midfielder

Youth career
- 2006–2009: AJA Villeneuve Grenoble
- 2009–2010: Lyon

Senior career*
Years	Team	Apps	(Gls)
2011–2013	Claix	42	(12)
2013–2014	Arras	19	(1)
2014–2016	Guingamp	39	(0)
2016–2022	Paris Saint-Germain	77	(2)
2020	→ Utah Royals (loan)	4	(1)
2021	→ Atlético Madrid (loan)	0	(0)
2023	Levante	3	(0)
2023–2024	Al-Nassr	13	(0)

International career
2012–2014	France U19	20	(2)
2014	France U20	7	(1)
2015–2019	France U23	18	(1)
2017–2021	France	7	(1)
- * Club domestic league appearances and goals

Aminata Fatou Diallo (born 3 April 1995) is a French footballer who last played as a midfielder for Saudi Women's Premier League club Al-Nassr.

== Club career ==
=== Paris Saint Germain, 2016–2022 ===
Diallo signed a two-season contract with Paris Saint-Germain Féminines in June 2016.

==== Utah Royals (2020, loan) ====
On 11 March 2020, Diallo joined Utah Royals on loan for the 2020 NWSL season.

==== Atlético de Madrid Femenino (2021, loan) ====
On 2 January 2021, Diallo joined Atlético de Madrid Femenino on loan. She made no appearances for the club.

She returned to Paris Saint-Germain in the summer of 2021. The club did not extend her contract when it expired at the end of the 2021–22 season.

=== Levante ===
On 2 January 2023, Diallo signed a six-month contract with Levante with an option to extend for another 12 months. She played five games, all as a substitute, receiving one yellow card. Levante did not trigger the extension on her contract.

=== Al-Nassr ===
Diallo joined Saudi Women's Premier League club Al Nassr ahead of the 2023–24 season.

== Personal life ==
Diallo is of Senegalese descent.

In November 2021, Diallo's Paris Saint-Germain teammate Kheira Hamraoui was assaulted in the street after two masked men dragged her from a club-issued car driven by Diallo, who was pinned down but not seriously injured herself. On 10 November 2021, Diallo was arrested on suspicion of arranging the attack. After 36 hours, Diallo was released from police custody without any charges being filed against her. After further investigation she was re-arrested in September 2022 on charges of serious bodily harm. Placed under judicial supervision and forbidden from entering Paris or contacting her former team as the investigation was conducted, Diallo contested her innocence to the press in October 2022, saying that she did not know the four men (charged with conducting the attack) who alleged she hired them.

== Career statistics ==
=== International ===
As of 6 April 2018

Appearances and goals by national team and year
National team	Year	Apps	Goals
France	2017	4	0
France	2018	3	1
Total		7	1

Scores and results list France's goal tally first, score column indicates score after each Diallo goal.

List of international goals scored by Aminata Diallo
No.	Date	Venue	Opponent	Score	Result	Competition
1	6 April 2018	MMArena, Le Mans, France	Nigeria	4–0	8–0	Friendly

== Honours ==
Paris Saint-Germain

- Coupe de France féminine: 2017–18, 2021–22
- UEFA Women's Champions League: runner-up 2016–17

Al-Nassr

- Saudi Women's Premier League: 2023-24

France U19

- UEFA Women's Under-19 Championship: 2013
