= Alice Pinguet =

French footballer (born 2003)

Personal information
- Date of birth: 29 June 2003 (age 23)
- Place of birth: Nevers, France
- Height: 1.83 m (6 ft 0 in)
- Position: Goalkeeper

Team information
- Current team: Valencia
- Number: 25

Youth career
- 2008–2015: Coulanges-lès-Nevers
- 2015–2016: FC Nevers
- 2016–2018: FC Nevers 58
- 2016–2020: Paris Saint-Germain

Senior career*
Years	Team	Apps	(Gls)
2020–2023	Paris Saint-Germain	0	(0)
2021–2022	→ Le Havre (loan)	8	(0)
2022–2023	→ Issy (loan)	14	(0)
2023–2025	Dijon	11	(0)
2025–2026	Saint-Étienne	22	(0)
2026–	Valencia	8	(0)

International career^{‡}
2018	France U16	2	(0)
2019	France U17	1	(0)
2019	France U19	1	(0)
2019–2020	France U20	3	(0)
2025–	France U23	5	(0)
- * Club domestic league appearances and goals as of 18:33, 1 November 2026 (UTC) ‡ National team caps and goals as of 18:33, 1 November 2026 (UTC)

Alice Pinguet (born 29 June 2003) is a French professional footballer who plays as a goalkeeper for Liga F club Valencia. She has previously played for Première Ligue clubs Paris Saint-Germain, Le Havre, Dijon, and Saint-Étienne, in addition to a loan spell at Seconde Ligue club Issy.

== Youth career ==
Pinguet was born and raised in Nevers, France. She started playing football as a five-year-old for Coulanges-lès-Nevers, a club owned by her parents. In 2016, she joined FC Nevers 58, where she played among boys in the regional championship. The same year, she signed for Paris Saint-Germain's academy. She went on to serve as PSG's starting goalkeeper in the club's journey to a 2019 youth national title. The following season, she led the under-19 championship with the lowest amount of goals conceded across the opening 13 matches of the campaign before the COVID-19 pandemic halted play. Pinguet was also trained at INSEP.

== Club career ==
=== Paris Saint-Germain ===
In June 2020, Pinguet, age 17, signed her first professional contract with Paris Saint-Germain, inking a two-year deal. The same month, she was voted by PSG fans as the best goalkeeper of the decade to be trained at the club. Pinguet spent her first professional season as a member of a strong youth contingent at PSG. Facing heavy competition from three other goalkeepers, including Stephanie Labbé and Barbora Votíková, she was unable to find any playing time.

On 31 August 2021, Pinguet's contract was extended for an additional two years (now lasting until 2024), and she was subsequently loaned out to Le Havre AC for one season. For most of her stint at Le Havre, Pinguet split time in goal with Russian teammate Olesya Arsenieva. She started 4 times in the opening 6 matches of the season, but lost momentum after conceding both a red card and an own goal in a single match and ended up finishing the year as the second-choice goalkeeper. She totaled 8 league appearances and 2 in the Coupe de France.

Upon returning to her parent club, Pinguet hoped to earn another loan deal, but PSG refused, instead wanting her to be the third-stringer behind Constance Picaud and Lydia Williams. In October 2022, the club relented, and Pinguet was loaned out to Division 2 Féminine side GPSO 92 Issy through the end of the campaign. Despite having one year remaining on her contract, Pinguet departed from PSG at the end of her loan.

=== Dijon ===
In July 2023, Pinguet joined newly-promoted team Dijon FCO as the intended backup to Lisa Lichtfus. She made her Dijon debut on 4 November 2023, playing against her former club, Le Havre AC. She was then selected to start the following two matches as an experiment, but was unable to make a case for significant additional playing time. She made one more league appearance as Lichtfus took up the lion's share of minutes.

Pinguet entered her second season at Dijon with aspirations to become the team's starting goalkeeper. She spent the campaign as a rotational option to Katriina Talaslahti and appeared in 7 league games. She also earned 6 clean sheets aross all competitions. Pinguet's efforts helped Dijon finish the 2024–25 Première Ligue in fourth place and reach the semifinals of the league playoffs.

=== Saint-Étienne ===
On 22 June 2025, Pinguet was announced to have signed for AS Saint-Étienne, a club she had supported since she was a child, as a free agent; the move also reunited Pinguet with former Dijon manager Sébastien-Joseph, who had joined the club earlier in the month. She became the first-choice goalkeeper for the first time in her career, playing in 22 Première Ligue games across the season. In October 2025, she was nominated for the Première Ligue Player of the Month award, alongside Anaële Le Moguédec and Sonia Ouchene. Over the course of the season, Saint-Étienne struggled to find cohesion and ended up getting relegated after finishing last in the league. Pinguet was revealed to be departing from the club on 29 June 2026.

=== Valencia ===
Spanish club Valencia CF announced the signing of Pinguet to a one-year deal on 4 July 2026.

== International career ==
Pinguet started playing for France at the youth international level with the U16 through U19 national teams. From the U17 to U20 levels, she often played up an age group. In 2018, she appeared twice for the under-16s in the UEFA Development Tournament, helping France record three wins. With the under-20s, she made 3 appearances across two years. In April 2025, after four years away from international duty, Pinguet made her debut for the U23 national team in a 3–2 victory over Denmark.

On 1 March 2026, Pinguet earned her first call-up to the France senior national team, becoming the first-ever player from Nivernais to do so.
