= 2020–21 Division 1 Féminine =

47th season of top French women's football league

Division 1 Féminine
- Season: 2020–21
- Dates: 5 September 2020 – 5 June 2021
- Champions: Paris Saint-Germain (1st title)
- Relegated: Le Havre
- Champions League: Paris Saint-Germain; Lyon; Bordeaux
- Matches: 132
- Goals: 422 (3.2 per match)
- Top goalscorer: Khadija Shaw (22 goals)
- Biggest home win: Lyon 9–0 Issy (12 December 2020)
- Biggest away win: Issy 0–14 Paris Saint-Germain (14 November 2020)
- Highest scoring: Issy 0–14 Paris Saint-Germain (14 November 2020)
- Longest winning run: Paris Saint-Germain (19 matches)
- Longest unbeaten run: Paris Saint-Germain (22 matches)
- Longest winless run: Le Havre (19 matches)
- Longest losing run: Le Havre (8 matches)

The 2020–21 Division 1 Féminine season, also known as D1 Arkema for sponsorship reasons, was the 47th edition of Division 1 Féminine since its establishment in 1974. The season began on 5 September 2020 and ended on 5 June 2021. Lyon were the defending champions, having won the title for last fourteen consecutive seasons. Paris Saint-Germain won their first league title in history after securing a 3–0 win against Dijon on the final day of the season.

== Teams ==
Location of teams in 2020–21 Division 1 Féminine

A total of 12 teams compete in the league. Champions and runners-up of previous season's Division 2 Féminine (Issy and Le Havre) replaced two relegated teams from last season's Division 1 Féminine (Metz and Marseille).

| Team | Manager | Ground | Capacity | 2019–20 season |
|---|---|---|---|---|
| Bordeaux | (Spain) Pedro Martínez Losa | Stade Sainte-Germaine, Le Bouscat | 7,048 | 3rd |
| Dijon | (France) Yannick Chandioux | Stade des Poussots, Dijon | 498 | 9th |
| Fleury | (France) David Fanzel | Stade Walter Felder, Fleury-Mérogis | 1,000 | 7th |
| Guingamp | (France) Frédéric Biancalani | Stade de l'Akademi EA Guingamp, Pabu | 1,960 | 6th |
| Lyon | (France) Sonia Bompastor | Groupama OL Training Center, Décines-Charpieu | 1,500 | 1st |
| Issy | (France) Camillo Vaz | Stade Le Gallo, Boulogne-Billancourt | 2,000 | D2 Group A, 1st |
| Le Havre | (France) Michaël Bunel | Stade Océane, Le Havre | 25,000 | D2 Group B, 1st |
| Montpellier | (France) Frédéric Mendy | Stade Bernard Gasset - Mama Ouattara Field, Montpellier | 1,280 | 4th |
| Paris FC | (France) Sandrine Soubeyrand | Stade Robert Bobin, Bondoufle | 18,845 | 5th |
| Paris Saint-Germain | (France) Olivier Echouafni | Stade Jean-Bouin, Paris; Stade Georges Lefèvre, St-Germain-en-Laye | 20,000; 2,164 | 2nd |
| Reims | (France) Amandine Miquel | Stade Louis Blériot, Bétheny | 500 | 8th |
| Soyaux | (France) Laurent Mortel | Stade Léo Lagrange, Soyaux | 385 | 10th |

== League table ==
| Pos | Team | Pld | W | D | L | GF | GA | GD | Pts | Qualification or relegation |
|---|---|---|---|---|---|---|---|---|---|---|
| 1 | Paris Saint-Germain (C) | 22 | 20 | 2 | 0 | 83 | 4 | +79 | 62 | Qualification for the Champions League group stage |
| 2 | Lyon | 22 | 20 | 1 | 1 | 78 | 6 | +72 | 61 | Qualification for the Champions League second round |
| 3 | Bordeaux | 22 | 14 | 2 | 6 | 50 | 23 | +27 | 44 | Qualification for the Champions League first round |
| 4 | Paris FC | 22 | 11 | 4 | 7 | 39 | 29 | +10 | 37 | |
| 5 | Guingamp | 22 | 9 | 4 | 9 | 29 | 32 | −3 | 31 | |
| 6 | Reims | 22 | 9 | 3 | 10 | 34 | 42 | −8 | 30 (Note: Reims finished ahead of Montpellier on head-to-head goal difference: Reims 0–1 Montpellier, Montpellier 0–4 Reims.) | |
| 7 | Montpellier | 22 | 9 | 3 | 10 | 27 | 35 | −8 | 30 | |
| 8 | Dijon | 22 | 8 | 2 | 12 | 24 | 37 | −13 | 26 | |
| 9 | Fleury | 22 | 7 | 4 | 11 | 18 | 42 | −24 | 25 | |
| 10 | Soyaux | 22 | 5 | 2 | 15 | 15 | 46 | −31 | 17 | |
| 11 | Issy | 22 | 3 | 1 | 18 | 11 | 77 | −66 | 10 | |
| 12 | Le Havre (R) | 22 | 2 | 2 | 18 | 14 | 49 | −35 | 8 | Relegation to Division 2 Féminine |

Rules for classification: 1) points; 2) head-to-head points; 3) head-to-head goal difference; 4) goal difference; 5) goals scored
(C) Champions; (R) Relegated

== Results ==
| Home \ Away | BOR | DIJ | FLE | GUI | ISY | LHV | LYO | MON | PFC | PSG | REI | SOY |
|---|---|---|---|---|---|---|---|---|---|---|---|---|
| Bordeaux | — | 5–1 | 6–1 | 1–0 | 1–0 | 6–0 | 0–1 | 2–0 | 2–3 | 0–0 | 7–1 | 2–1 |
| Dijon | 0–2 | — | 3–1 | 2–1 | 3–1 | 2–1 | 0–3 | 1–0 | 0–1 | 0–3 | 0–0 | 3–2 |
| Fleury | 1–2 | 2–0 | — | 0–2 | 3–1 | 1–0 | 0–3 | 0–0 | 1–1 | 0–5 | 1–2 | 0–0 |
| Guingamp | 4–2 | 1–2 | 0–1 | — | 2–0 | 2–1 | 0–5 | 4–1 | 1–1 | 0–5 | 0–0 | 3–0 |
| Issy | 3–1 | 1–0 | 0–1 | 1–6 | — | 0–4 | 0–4 | 0–3 | 0–4 | 0–14 | 1–2 | 0–1 |
| Le Havre | 0–2 | 0–2 | 1–3 | 0–1 | 0–0 | — | 1–3 | 1–4 | 1–0 | 0–2 | 0–1 | 0–1 |
| Lyon | 2–1 | 2–0 | 8–0 | 4–0 | 9–0 | 5–1 | — | 2–1 | 4–0 | 0–0 | 3–0 | 5–1 |
| Montpellier | 0–1 | 1–1 | 0–0 | 2–0 | 3–1 | 3–1 | 0–5 | — | 2–1 | 0–3 | 0–4 | 2–1 |
| Paris FC | 0–1 | 3–2 | 2–0 | 0–0 | 5–0 | 1–1 | 0–5 | 2–0 | — | 2–3 | 3–1 | 2–0 |
| PSG | 1–0 | 3–0 | 4–0 | 4–1 | 4–0 | 5–0 | 1–0 | 4–0 | 4–1 | — | 4–0 | 7–0 |
| Reims | 4–4 | 2–1 | 1–2 | 0–1 | 7–1 | 2–1 | 0–3 | 0–1 | 1–4 | 0–4 | — | 4–0 |
| Soyaux | 0–2 | 2–1 | 1–0 | 0–0 | 0–1 | 3–0 | 0–2 | 1–4 | 0–3 | 0–3 | 1–2 | — |

Source: Division 1 Féminine
Legend: Blue = home team win; Yellow = draw; Red = away team win.
For upcoming matches, an "a" indicates there is an article about the rivalry between the two participants.

=== Positions by round ===
The table lists the positions of teams after each week of matches. In order to preserve chronological evolvements, any postponed matches are not included to the round at which they were originally scheduled, but added to the full round they were played immediately afterwards.

| Team ╲ Round | 1 | 2 | 3 | 4 | 5 | 6 | 7 | 8 | 9 | 10 | 11 | 12 | 13 | 14 | 15 | 16 | 17 | 18 | 19 | 20 | 21 | 22 |
|---|---|---|---|---|---|---|---|---|---|---|---|---|---|---|---|---|---|---|---|---|---|---|
| Bordeaux | 5 | 9 | 9 | 7 | 4 | 5 | 4 | 3 | 3 | 3 | 3 | 3 | 3 | 3 | 3 | 3 | 3 | 3 | 3 | 3 | 3 | 3 |
| Dijon | 9 | 8 | 5 | 6 | 9 | 4 | 6 | 6 | 7 | 6 | 7 | 8 | 7 | 8 | 8 | 8 | 9 | 8 | 8 | 8 | 8 | 8 |
| Fleury | 7 | 2 | 3 | 4 | 7 | 7 | 7 | 7 | 5 | 5 | 5 | 6 | 5 | 5 | 7 | 7 | 7 | 9 | 9 | 9 | 9 | 9 |
| Guingamp | 10 | 11 | 11 | 11 | 11 | 11 | 9 | 9 | 8 | 9 | 8 | 7 | 8 | 6 | 5 | 6 | 5 | 5 | 5 | 5 | 6 | 5 |
| Issy | 11 | 12 | 12 | 12 | 12 | 12 | 10 | 10 | 10 | 10 | 11 | 11 | 10 | 11 | 11 | 11 | 11 | 11 | 11 | 11 | 11 | 11 |
| Le Havre | 1 | 7 | 6 | 8 | 10 | 10 | 12 | 12 | 12 | 12 | 12 | 12 | 12 | 12 | 12 | 12 | 12 | 12 | 12 | 12 | 12 | 12 |
| Lyon | 2 | 1 | 1 | 1 | 1 | 1 | 1 | 1 | 2 | 2 | 2 | 2 | 2 | 2 | 2 | 2 | 2 | 2 | 2 | 2 | 2 | 2 |
| Montpellier | 8 | 3 | 2 | 3 | 3 | 3 | 3 | 4 | 4 | 4 | 4 | 4 | 4 | 4 | 4 | 5 | 6 | 6 | 6 | 6 | 5 | 7 |
| Paris FC | 12 | 5 | 7 | 9 | 5 | 6 | 5 | 5 | 6 | 7 | 6 | 5 | 6 | 7 | 6 | 4 | 4 | 4 | 4 | 4 | 4 | 4 |
| PSG | 3 | 4 | 4 | 2 | 2 | 2 | 2 | 2 | 1 | 1 | 1 | 1 | 1 | 1 | 1 | 1 | 1 | 1 | 1 | 1 | 1 | 1 |
| Reims | 6 | 10 | 10 | 10 | 6 | 8 | 8 | 8 | 9 | 8 | 9 | 9 | 9 | 9 | 9 | 9 | 8 | 7 | 7 | 7 | 7 | 6 |
| Soyaux | 4 | 6 | 8 | 5 | 8 | 9 | 11 | 11 | 11 | 11 | 10 | 10 | 11 | 10 | 10 | 10 | 10 | 10 | 10 | 10 | 10 | 10 |

| Leader and UEFA Champions League group stage |
| UEFA Champions League second round |
| UEFA Champions League first round |
| Relegation to 2021–22 Division 2 Féminine |

Source: Division 1

== Season statistics ==
=== Top scorers ===
As of 5 June 2021

| Rank | Player | Club | Goals |
|---|---|---|---|
| 1 | (Jamaica) Khadija Shaw | Bordeaux | 22 |
| 2 | (France) Marie-Antoinette Katoto | Paris Saint-Germain | 21 |
| 3 | (France) Kadidiatou Diani | Paris Saint-Germain | 13 |
| 3 | (France) Clara Matéo | Paris FC | 13 |
| 3 | (England) Nikita Parris | Lyon | 13 |
| 6 | (France) Faustine Robert | Guingamp | 11 |
| 6 | (Canada) Évelyne Viens | Paris FC | 11 |
| 8 | (Portugal) Mélissa Gomes | Reims | 10 |
| 8 | (France) Amel Majri | Lyon | 10 |
| 8 | (Denmark) Nadia Nadim | Paris Saint-Germain | 10 |
| 8 | (France) Wendie Renard | Lyon | 10 |

=== Most clean sheets ===
As of 5 June 2021

| Rank | Player | Club | Clean sheets |
|---|---|---|---|
| 1 | (Chile) Christiane Endler | Paris Saint-Germain | 19 |
| 2 | (France) Sarah Bouhaddi | Lyon | 14 |
| 3 | (England) Anna Moorhouse | Bordeaux | 10 |
| 4 | (France) Solène Durand | Guingamp | 8 |
| 5 | (Nigeria) Chiamaka Nnadozie | Paris FC | 7 |
| 6 | (France) Romane Munich | Soyaux | 6 |
| 7 | (France) Manon Heil | Fleury | 5 |
| 7 | (United States) Phallon Tullis-Joyce | Reims | 5 |
| 9 | (France) Laëtitia Philippe | Fleury/Issy | 4 |
| 9 | (Germany) Lisa Schmitz | Montpellier | 4 |

=== Hat-tricks ===
| Player | Club | Against | Result | Date |
|---|---|---|---|---|
| (France) Kadidiatou Diani | Paris Saint-Germain | Guingamp | 4–1 (H) | 5 September 2020 |
| (France) Sonia Ouchene | Reims | Issy | 7–1 (H) | 3 October 2020 |
| (Jamaica) Khadija Shaw^{4} | Bordeaux | Fleury | 6–1 (H) | 10 October 2020 |
| (Canada) Évelyne Viens | Paris FC | Issy | 5–0 (H) | 10 October 2020 |
| (France) Clara Matéo | Paris FC | Reims | 3–1 (H) | 31 October 2020 |
| (Jamaica) Khadija Shaw | Bordeaux | Dijon | 5–1 (H) | 31 October 2020 |
| (Denmark) Nadia Nadim^{7} | Paris Saint-Germain | Issy | 14–0 (A) | 14 November 2020 |
| (England) Nikita Parris^{4} | Lyon | Issy | 9–0 (H) | 12 December 2020 |
| (France) Amel Majri | Lyon | Issy | 9–0 (H) | 12 December 2020 |
| (France) Marie-Antoinette Katoto^{4} | Paris Saint-Germain | Le Havre | 5–0 (H) | 13 December 2020 |
| (Jamaica) Khadija Shaw | Bordeaux | Reims | 7–1 (H) | 23 January 2021 |
| (France) Maëlle Garbino | Bordeaux | Le Havre | 6–0 (H) | 27 February 2021 |
| (France) Marie-Antoinette Katoto | Paris Saint-Germain | Soyaux | 7–0 (H) | 4 April 2021 |

- ^{4} Player scored four goals.
- ^{7} Player scored seven goals.

== Awards ==
=== Player of the Month ===
| Month | Winner | Club | Ref. |
|---|---|---|---|
| September 2020 | (France) Kadidiatou Diani | Paris Saint-Germain | |
| October 2020 | (Jamaica) Khadija Shaw | Bordeaux | |
| November 2020 | (France) Marie-Antoinette Katoto | Paris Saint-Germain | |
| December 2020 | (France) Marie-Antoinette Katoto | Paris Saint-Germain | |
| January 2021 | (Jamaica) Khadija Shaw | Bordeaux | |
| February 2021 | (France) Maëlle Garbino | Bordeaux | |
| March 2021 | (Costa Rica) Melissa Herrera | Reims | |
| April 2021 | (Costa Rica) Melissa Herrera | Reims | |

=== UNFP Awards ===
Nominations for Player of the Year, Young Player of the Year and Goalkeeper of the Year were announced on 11 May 2021. Winners along with Team of the Year were announced on 21, 22 and 23 May.

| Award | Winner | Club |
|---|---|---|
| Player of the Year | (France) Kadidiatou Diani | Paris Saint-Germain |
| Young Player of the Year | (France) Sandy Baltimore | Paris Saint-Germain |
| Goalkeeper of the Year | (Chile) Christiane Endler | Paris Saint-Germain |

Team of the Year
| Goalkeeper | (Chile) Christiane Endler (Paris Saint-Germain) | | | |
| Defenders | (Canada) Ashley Lawrence (Paris Saint-Germain) | (France) Wendie Renard (Lyon) | (Spain) Irene Paredes (Paris Saint-Germain) | (France) Sakina Karchaoui (Lyon) |
| Midfielders | (Germany) Dzsenifer Marozsán (Lyon) | (France) Grace Geyoro (Paris Saint-Germain) | (France) Sandy Baltimore (Paris Saint-Germain) | |
| Forwards | (France) Kadidiatou Diani (Paris Saint-Germain) | (France) Marie-Antoinette Katoto (Paris Saint-Germain) | (France) Delphine Cascarino (Lyon) | |

=== FFF D1 Arkema Awards ===
The winners of the 2021 D1 Arkema individual awards were announced on 5 June 2021.

| Award | Winner | Club |
|---|---|---|
| Player of the Year | (France) Kadidiatou Diani | Paris Saint-Germain |
| Young Player of the Year | (France) Sandy Baltimore | Paris Saint-Germain |
| Goalkeeper of the Year | (Chile) Christiane Endler | Paris Saint-Germain |
| Best Manager | (France) Olivier Echouafni | Paris Saint-Germain |
| Goal of the Season | (France) Grace Geyoro | Paris Saint-Germain |

==== Team of the Season ====
Team of the Season
| Goalkeeper | (Chile) Christiane Endler (Paris Saint-Germain) | | | |
| Defenders | (Australia) Ellie Carpenter (Lyon) | (Spain) Irene Paredes (Paris Saint-Germain) | (France) Wendie Renard (Lyon) | (France) Sakina Karchaoui (Paris Saint-Germain) |
| Midfielders | (France) Kadidiatou Diani (Paris Saint-Germain) | (Germany) Dzsenifer Marozsán (Lyon) | (France) Grace Geyoro (Paris Saint-Germain) | (France) Sandy Baltimore (Paris Saint-Germain) |
| Forwards | (France) Marie-Antoinette Katoto (Paris Saint-Germain) | | (Jamaica) Khadija Shaw (Bordeaux) | |
