= Première Ligue Player of the Month =

French women's football (soccer) award

The Première Ligue Player of the Month is an association football award that recognises the best adjudged Première Ligue player each month of the season.

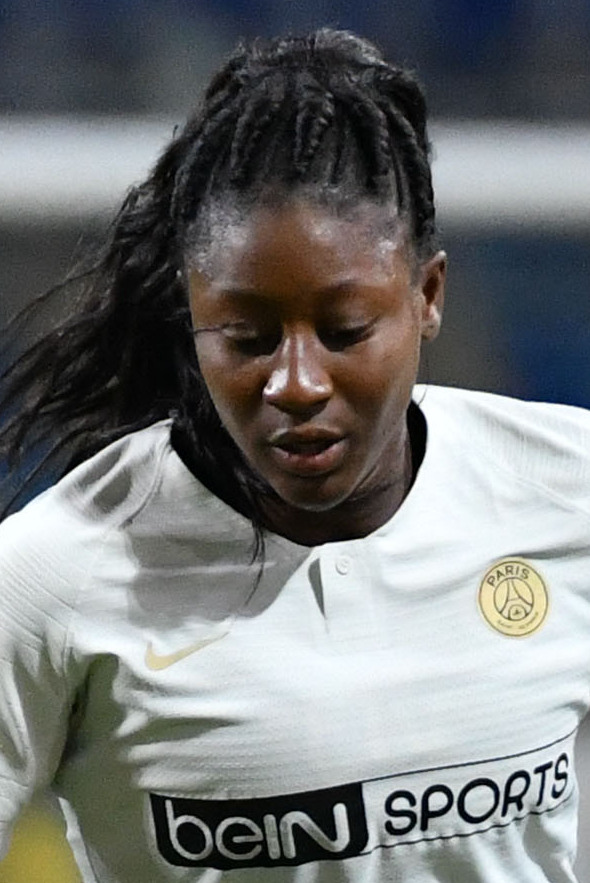
Kadidiatou Diani won the inaugural award in September 2020.

The award was created by the French Football Federation in September 2020 as Division 1 Féminine Player of the Month with the support of league's title sponsors Arkema and television right holders Canal+. In October 2021, UNFP joined other sponsors to become a partner of the trophy. Since the 2026–27 season, the UNFP has awarded the trophy in partnership with the LFFP and Canal+.

The most recent recipient of the award is Lyon player Melchie Dumornay, who won the award in October 2026.

== Winners ==
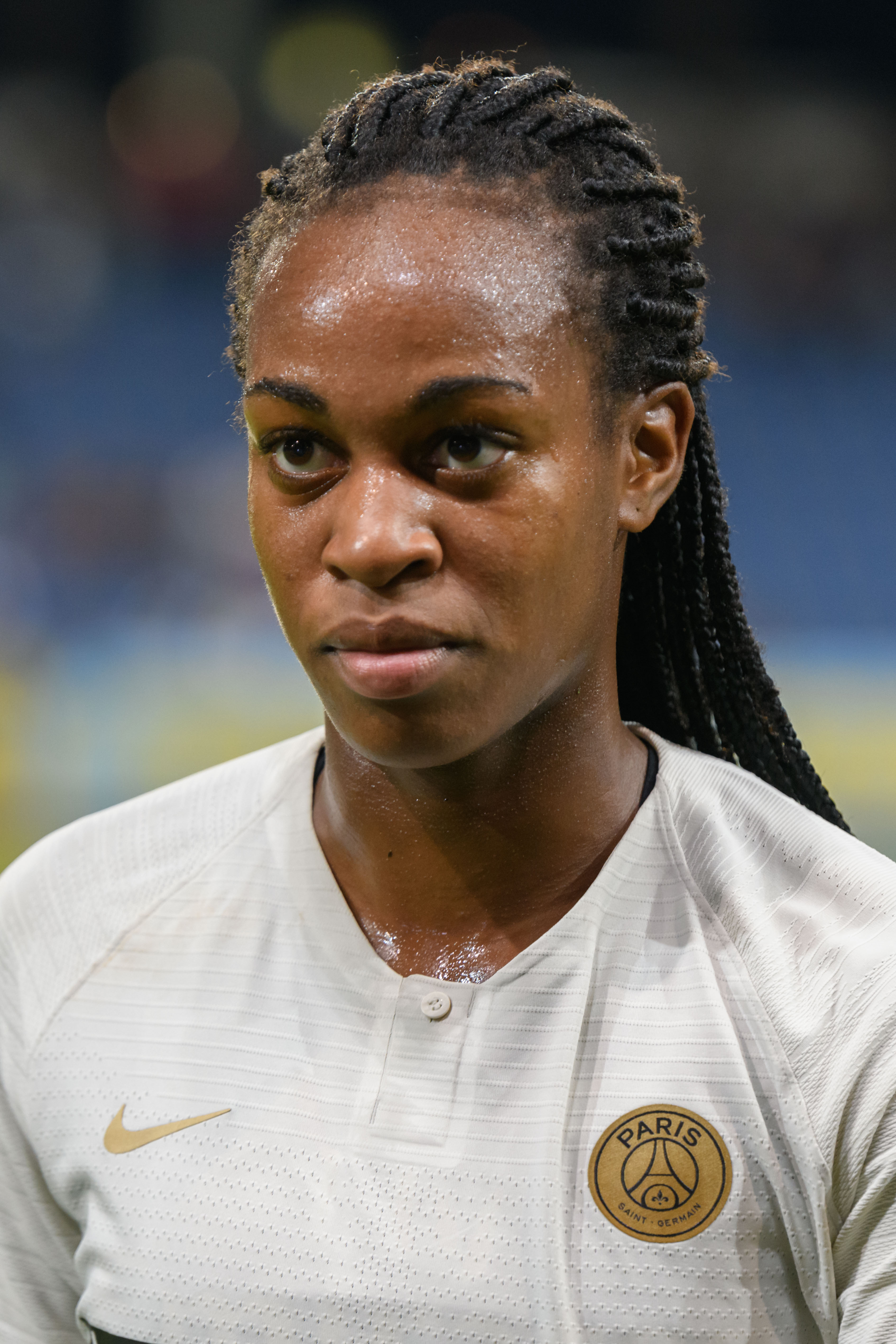
Marie-Antoinette Katoto is the first player to win the award in consecutive months.

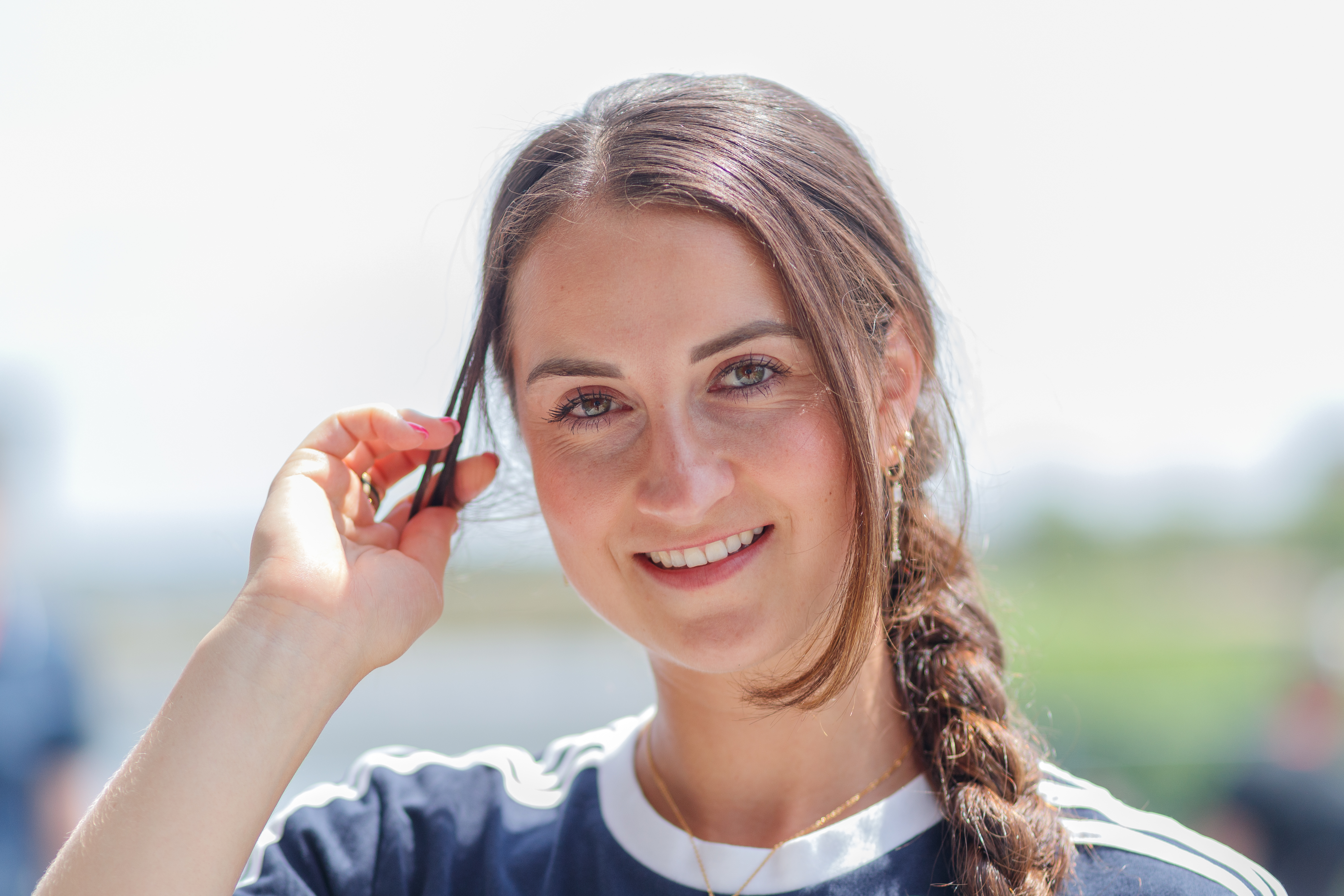
Sara Däbritz is the first player to win the award with different clubs.

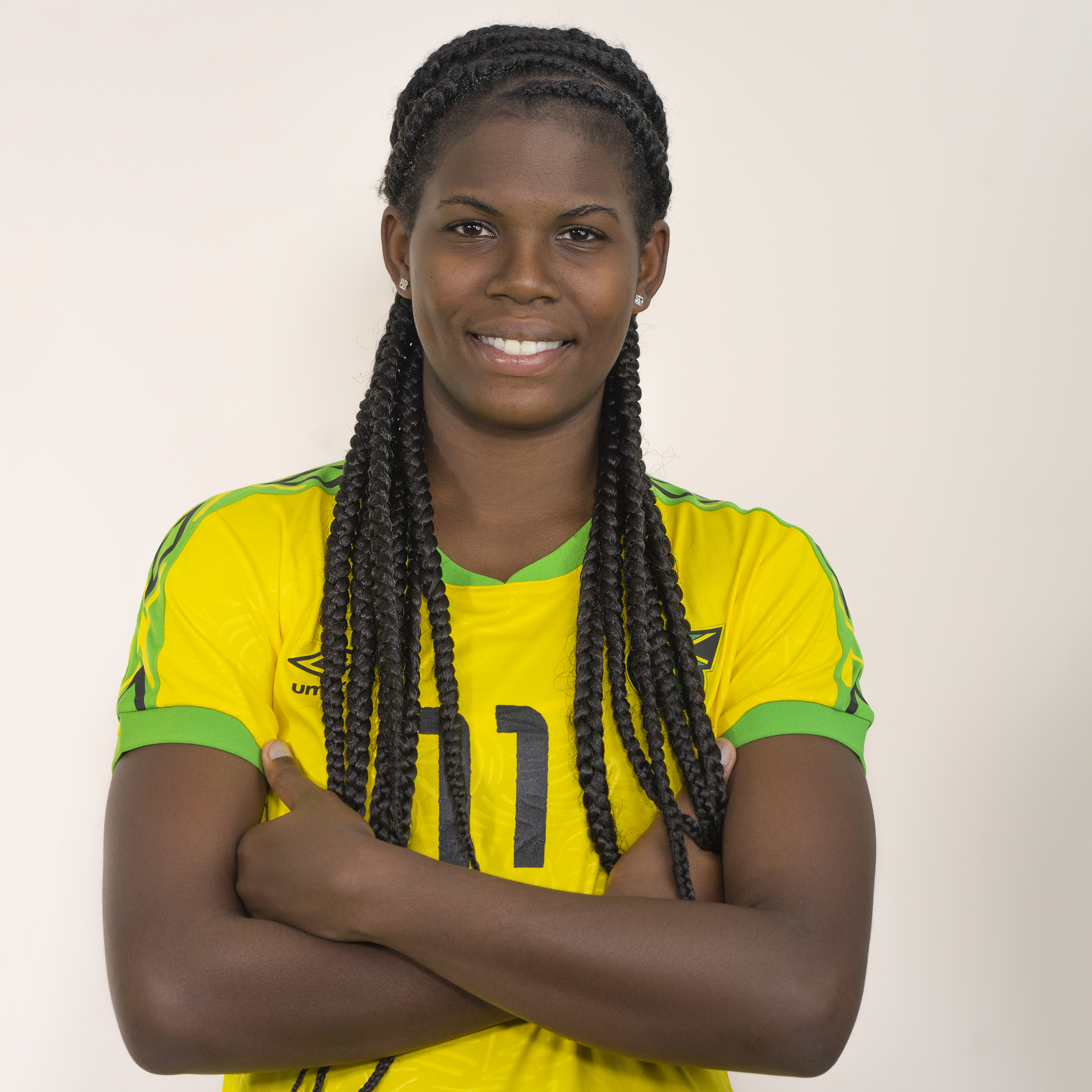
Khadija Shaw is the first player from the Americas to win the award.

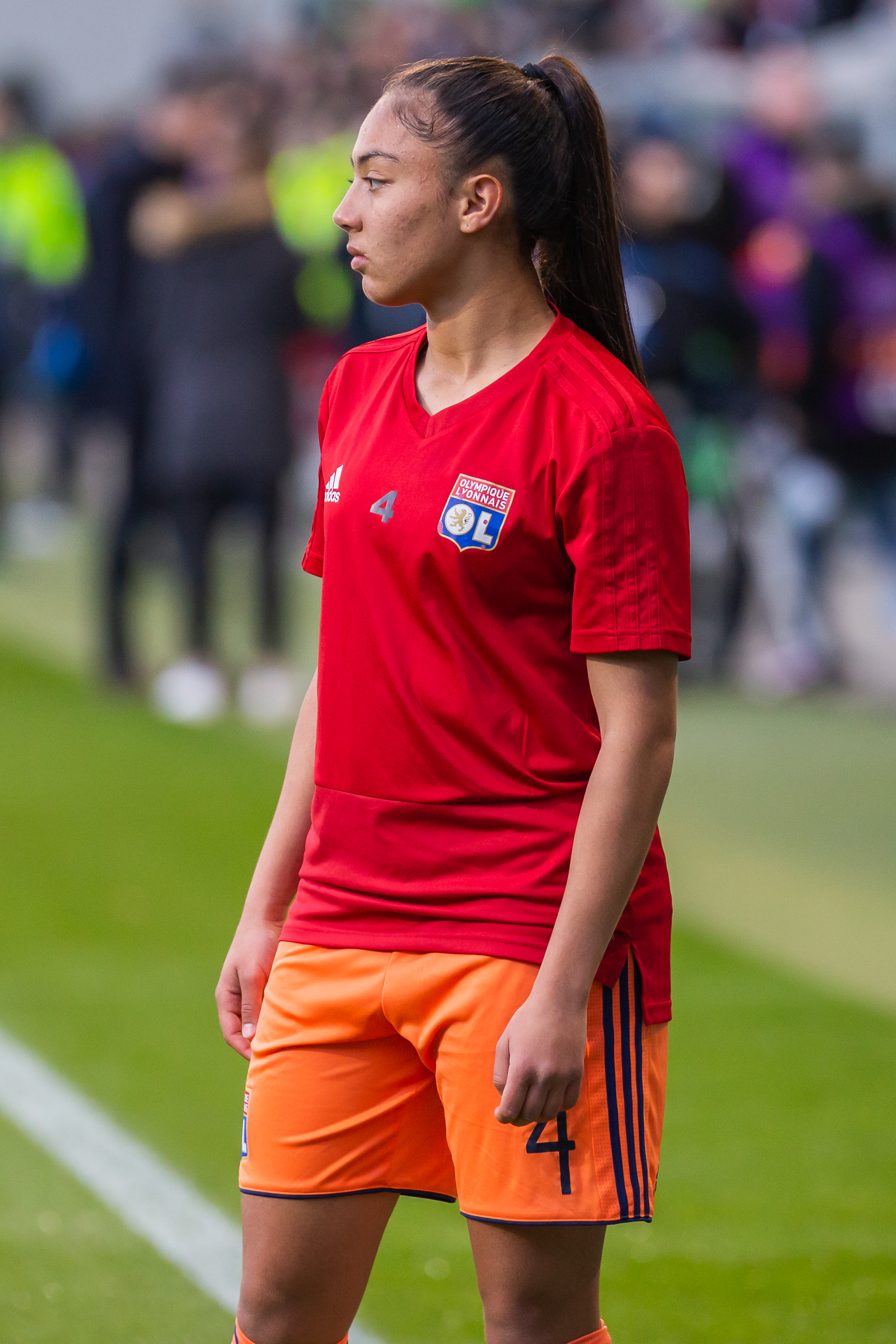
Selma Bacha is the first defender to win the award.

Month	Year (Note: Each year in the table is linked to the article about the corresponding football season.)	Player	Team	Ref
September	2020	(France) Kadidiatou Diani	Paris Saint-Germain	
October	2020	(Jamaica) Khadija Shaw	Bordeaux	
November	2020	(France) Marie-Antoinette Katoto	Paris Saint-Germain	
December	2020	(France) Marie-Antoinette Katoto	Paris Saint-Germain	
January	2021	(Jamaica) Khadija Shaw	Bordeaux	
February	2021	(France) Maëlle Garbino	Bordeaux	
March	2021	(Costa Rica) Melissa Herrera	Reims	
April	2021	(Costa Rica) Melissa Herrera	Reims	
September	2021	(Germany) Sara Däbritz	Paris Saint-Germain	
October	2021	(France) Selma Bacha	Lyon	
November	2021	(France) Selma Bacha	Lyon	
December	2021	(France) Sakina Karchaoui	Paris Saint-Germain	
January	2022	(France) Marie-Antoinette Katoto	Paris Saint-Germain	
February	2022	(France) Clara Mateo	Paris FC	
March	2022	(Ivory Coast) Rosemonde Kouassi	Fleury	
April	2022	(United States) Catarina Macario	Lyon	
May	2022	(Ivory Coast) Rosemonde Kouassi	Fleury	
September	2022	(France) Maëlle Garbino	Bordeaux	
October	2022	(France) Kadidiatou Diani	Paris Saint-Germain	
November	2022	(France) Maëlle Garbino	Bordeaux	
December	2022	(Haiti) Melchie Dumornay	Reims	
January	2023	(Germany) Sara Däbritz	Lyon	
February	2023	(France) Delphine Cascarino	Lyon	
March	2023	(France) Amel Majri	Lyon	
April	2023	(France) Grace Geyoro	Paris Saint-Germain	
May	2023	(Haiti) Melchie Dumornay	Reims	
September	2023	(France) Eugénie Le Sommer	Lyon	
October	2023	(Haiti) Melchie Dumornay	Lyon	
November	2023	(France) Inès Benyahia	Le Havre	
December	2023	(Netherlands) Damaris Egurrola	Lyon	
January	2024	(Norway) Ada Hegerberg	Lyon	
February	2024	(Malawi) Tabitha Chawinga	Paris Saint-Germain	
March	2024	(Malawi) Tabitha Chawinga	Paris Saint-Germain	
April	2024	(France) Noémie Mouchon	Reims	
September	2024	(United States) Lindsey Horan	Lyon	
October	2024	(France) Manon Uffren	Nantes	
November	2024	(France) Clara Mateo	Paris FC	
December	2024	(France) Clara Mateo	Paris FC	
January	2025	(France) Kessya Bussy	Paris FC	
February	2025	(France) Sakina Karchaoui	Paris Saint-Germain	
March	2025	(Haiti) Melchie Dumornay	Lyon	
September	2025	(France) Clara Mateo	Paris FC	
October	2025	(France) Sonia Ouchene	Montpellier	
November	2025	(Germany) Jule Brand	Lyon	
December	2025	(France) Lucie Calba	Nantes	
January	2026	(Belgium) Mariam Toloba	Nantes	
February	2026	(Netherlands) Romée Leuchter	Paris Saint-Germain	
March	2026	(France) Sakina Karchaoui	Paris Saint-Germain	
April	2026	(France) Maeline Mendy	Paris FC	
September	2026	(Haiti) Melchie Dumornay	Lyon	
October	2026	(Haiti) Melchie Dumornay	Lyon	

== Multiple winners ==
The table below lists those who have won the award on more than one occasion.

As of October 2026 award

Rank	Player	Wins
1	(Haiti) Melchie Dumornay	6
2	(France) Clara Mateo	4
3	(France) Maëlle Garbino	3
3	(France) Sakina Karchaoui	3
3	(France) Marie-Antoinette Katoto	3
6	(France) Selma Bacha	2
6	(Malawi) Tabitha Chawinga	2
6	(Germany) Sara Däbritz	2
6	(France) Kadidiatou Diani	2
6	(Costa Rica) Melissa Herrera	2
6	(Ivory Coast) Rosemonde Kouassi	2
6	(Jamaica) Khadija Shaw	2

== Awards won by club ==
As of October 2026 award

Club	Players	Wins
Lyon	11	15
Paris Saint-Germain	7	13
Paris FC	3	6
Reims	3	5
Nantes	3	3
Bordeaux	2	5
Fleury	1	2
Le Havre	1	1
Montpellier	1	1

== Awards won by nationality ==
As of October 2026 award

Nationality	Players	Wins
France	17	28
Haiti	1	6
Germany	2	3
Netherlands	2	2
United States	2	2
Costa Rica	1	2
Ivory Coast	1	2
Jamaica	1	2
Malawi	1	2
Belgium	1	1
Norway	1	1

== All-time table ==
As of October 2026 award

Rank	Club	Wins	Nominations
1	Lyon	15	32
2	Paris Saint-Germain	13	35
3	Paris FC	6	29
4	Bordeaux	5	9
5	Reims	5	8
6	Nantes	3	6
7	Fleury	2	10
8	Le Havre	1	6
8	Montpellier	1	6
10	Dijon	0	4
11	Saint-Étienne	0	3
12	Guingamp	0	1
12	Lille	0	1
12	Marseille	0	1
12	Rodez	0	1
12	Strasbourg	0	1
