= 2022–23 Division 1 Féminine =

49th season of top French women's football league

Division 1 Féminine
- Season: 2022–23
- Dates: 9 September 2022 – 27 May 2023
- Champions: Lyon (16th title)
- Relegated: Soyaux; Rodez
- Champions League: Lyon; Paris Saint-Germain; Paris FC
- Matches: 132
- Goals: 403 (3.05 per match)
- Top goalscorer: Kadidiatou Diani (17 goals)
- Biggest home win: Lyon 8–0 Dijon (3 December 2022)
- Biggest away win: Le Havre 0–7 Lyon (2 April 2023)
- Highest scoring: Lyon 8–0 Dijon (3 December 2022); Fleury 4–4 Paris Saint-Germain (20 January 2023); Lyon 7–1 Reims (27 May 2023)
- Longest winning run: Lyon (11 matches)
- Longest unbeaten run: Paris Saint-Germain (20 matches)
- Longest winless run: Soyaux (19 matches)
- Longest losing run: Soyaux (7 matches)
- Highest attendance: 18,876; Paris Saint-Germain 0–1 Lyon (21 May 2023)
- Lowest attendance: 138; Reims 0–0 Rodez (19 November 2022)
- Total attendance: 126,292
- Average attendance: 957

The 2022–23 Division 1 Féminine season, also known as D1 Arkema for sponsorship reasons, is the 49th edition of Division 1 Féminine since its establishment in 1974. The season began on 9 September 2022 and ended on 27 May 2023. Lyon are the defending champions, having won their fifteenth league title in 2021–22 season.

== Teams ==
Location of teams in 2022–23 Division 1 Féminine

A total of 12 teams compete in the league. Rodez and Le Havre replaced Issy and Saint-Étienne, who were relegated to Division 2 Féminine at the end of the last season.

Team	Manager	Ground	Capacity	2021–22 season
Bordeaux	(France) Patrice Lair	Stade Sainte-Germaine, Le Bouscat	7,000	6th
Dijon	(France) Christophe Forest	Stade Gaston Gérard, Dijon	498	10th
Fleury	(France) Fabrice Abriel	Stade Auguste Gentelet, Fleury-Mérogis	1,000	4th
Guingamp	(France) Frédéric Biancalani	Stade de l'Akademi EA Guingamp, Pabu	1,960	8th
Le Havre	(France) Frédéric Gonçalves	Stade Océane, Le Havre	25,178	D2F Group A, 1st
Lyon	(France) Sonia Bompastor	Groupama OL Training Center, Décines-Charpieu	1,524	1st
Montpellier	(France) Yannick Chandioux	Stade Bernard Gasset - Mama Ouattara Field, Montpellier	1,280	5th
Paris FC	(France) Sandrine Soubeyrand	Stade Robert Bobin, Bondoufle	18,845	3rd
Paris Saint-Germain	(France) Gérard Prêcheur	Stade Municipal Georges Lefèvre, Saint-Germain-en-Laye	2,164	2nd
Reims	(France) Amandine Miquel	Stade Louis Blériot, Bétheny	500	7th
Rodez	(France) Mathieu Rufié	Stade Paul-Lignon, Rodez	5,955	D2F Group B, 1st
Soyaux	(France) Stéphane Guigo	Stade Léo Lagrange, Soyaux	385	9th

== League table ==
Pos	Team	Pld	W	D	L	GF	GA	GD	Pts	Qualification or relegation
1	Lyon (C)	22	20	1	1	69	9	+60	61	Qualification for the Champions League group stage
2	Paris Saint-Germain	22	17	4	1	45	12	+33	55	Qualification for the Champions League second round
3	Paris FC	22	12	6	4	44	18	+26	42	Qualification for the Champions League first round
4	Fleury	22	11	6	5	49	20	+29	39	
5	Montpellier	22	11	4	7	37	27	+10	37	
6	Reims	22	10	2	10	40	40	0	32	
7	Bordeaux	22	7	6	9	26	33	−7	27	
8	Le Havre	22	7	3	12	31	45	−14	24	
9	Guingamp	22	7	3	12	20	41	−21	24	
10	Dijon	22	4	3	15	12	53	−41	15	
11	Rodez (R)	22	3	3	16	16	48	−32	12	Relegation to Division 2 Féminine
12	Soyaux (R)	22	1	3	18	15	58	−43	6	Relegation to Division 2 Féminine

Source: Division 1 Féminine
Rules for classification: 1) points; 2) head-to-head points; 3) head-to-head goal difference; 4) goal difference; 5) goals scored
(C) Champions; (R) Relegated

== Results ==
Home \ Away	BOR	DIJ	FLE	GUI	LHV	LYO	MON	PFC	PSG	REI	ROD	SOY
Bordeaux	—	2–0	1–1	3–1	4–2	1–3	0–2	0–0	0–3	0–1	3–1	3–0
Dijon	1–1	—	1–5	1–0	0–2	0–3	2–1	0–2	0–4	0–4	1–2	1–0
Fleury	2–0	1–0	—	6–0	3–0	1–2	1–2	1–1	4–4	1–0	6–0	1–1
Guingamp	2–0	0–1	0–3	—	2–2	0–0	1–4	0–3	0–1	2–0	2–1	3–1
Le Havre	2–4	5–0	1–1	1–0	—	0–7	0–1	1–3	2–2	0–5	2–1	2–0
Lyon	3–0	8–0	1–0	6–0	1–0	—	2–0	2–0	0–1	7–1	2–0	2–1
Montpellier	0–0	3–0	1–1	0–1	2–1	1–3	—	1–3	0–1	2–0	2–1	2–2
Paris FC	1–1	2–0	0–2	2–2	1–0	2–3	2–0	—	0–1	2–2	2–0	5–2
PSG	1–0	3–1	2–1	1–0	3–1	0–1	2–2	0–0	—	4–0	1–0	2–0
Reims	6–1	3–1	1–3	3–0	3–1	1–5	1–3	0–3	0–2	—	0–0	3–1
Rodez	1–1	1–1	2–1	1–2	1–2	0–5	2–3	0–4	0–4	1–2	—	1–0
Soyaux	0–1	1–1	0–3	1–2	1–4	0–3	1–5	0–6	0–3	1–4	2–0	—

Source: Division 1 Féminine
Legend: Blue = home team win; Yellow = draw; Red = away team win.
For upcoming matches, an "a" indicates there is an article about the rivalry between the two participants.

== Season statistics ==
=== Top scorers ===
As of 27 May 2023

Rank	Player	Club	Goals
1	(France) Kadidiatou Diani	Paris Saint-Germain	17
2	(France) Mathilde Bourdieu	Paris FC	13
3	(France) Maëlle Garbino	Bordeaux	12
3	(France) Clara Matéo	Paris FC	12
5	(Haiti) Melchie Dumornay	Reims	11
6	(Ivory Coast) Rosemonde Kouassi	Fleury	10
7	(Haiti) Nérilia Mondésir	Montpellier	9
8	(Haiti) Batcheba Louis	Fleury	8
8	(Denmark) Signe Bruun	Lyon	8
8	(France) Kessya Bussy	Reims	8
8	(Poland) Ewelina Kamczyk	Fleury	8
8	(France) Faustine Robert	Montpellier	8
8	(France) Ouleymata Sarr	Paris FC	8

=== Most clean sheets ===
As of 27 May 2023

Rank	Player	Club	Clean sheets
1	(Chile) Christiane Endler	Lyon	12
2	(Nigeria) Chiamaka Nnadozie	Paris FC	11
3	(France) Sarah Bouhaddi	Paris Saint-Germain	9
3	(France) Manon Heil	Fleury	9
5	(France) Mylène Chavas	Bordeaux	5
5	(France) Constance Picaud	Paris Saint-Germain	5
5	(Germany) Lisa Schmitz	Montpellier	5
8	(Mexico) Emily Alvarado	Reims	4
8	(France) Laëtitia Philippe	Le Havre	4
10	(France) Solène Durand	Guingamp	3
10	(Belgium) Lisa Lichtfus	Dijon	3

=== Hat-tricks ===
Player	Club	Against	Result	Date
(France) Clara Matéo	Paris FC	Guingamp	3–0 (A)	19 November 2022
(Portugal) Kelsey Araújo	Le Havre	Dijon	5–0 (H)	26 November 2022
(Denmark) Signe Bruun	Lyon	Dijon	8–0 (H)	3 December 2022
(France) Kessya Bussy	Reims	Dijon	0–4 (A)	10 December 2022
(France) Kadidiatou Diani	Paris Saint-Germain	Fleury	4–4 (A)	20 January 2023
(France) Ouleymata Sarr	Paris FC	Soyaux	5–2 (H)	21 May 2023

== Awards ==
=== Player of the Month ===
Month	Winner	Club	Ref.
September 2022	(France) Maëlle Garbino	Bordeaux	
October 2022	(France) Kadidiatou Diani	Paris Saint-Germain	
November 2022	(France) Maëlle Garbino	Bordeaux	
December 2022	(Haiti) Melchie Dumornay	Reims	
January 2023	(Germany) Sara Däbritz	Lyon	
February 2023	(France) Delphine Cascarino	Lyon	
March 2023	(France) Amel Majri	Lyon	
April 2023	(France) Grace Geyoro	Paris Saint-Germain	
May 2023	(Haiti) Melchie Dumornay	Reims	

=== UNFP Awards ===
Nominations were announced on 16 May 2023. Winners along with the Team of the Season were announced on 28 May.

Note: Winners are displayed in boldface.

==== Player of the Year ====
Player	Club
(France) **Delphine Cascarino**	**Lyon**
(France) Kadidiatou Diani	Paris Saint-Germain
(Haiti) Melchie Dumornay	Reims
(France) Grace Geyoro	Paris Saint-Germain
(Ivory Coast) Rosemonde Kouassi	Fleury

==== Young Player of the Year ====
Player	Club
(France) Vicki Becho	Lyon
(Haiti) Melchie Dumornay	Reims
(France) **Laurina Fazer**	**Paris Saint-Germain**
(France) Aïrine Fontaine	Fleury
(France) Alice Sombath	Lyon

==== Goalkeeper of the Year ====
Player	Club
(Chile) **Christiane Endler**	**Lyon**
(France) Mylène Chavas	Bordeaux
(Nigeria) Chiamaka Nnadozie	Paris FC
(France) Laëtitia Philippe	Le Havre
(France) Constance Picaud	Paris Saint-Germain

==== Team of the Season ====
Position	Player	Club
GK	(Chile) Christiane Endler	Lyon
DF	(Australia) Ellie Carpenter	Lyon
DF	(France) Wendie Renard	Lyon
DF	(France) Élisa De Almeida	Paris Saint-Germain
DF	(France) Sakina Karchaoui	Paris Saint-Germain
MF	(France) Grace Geyoro	Paris Saint-Germain
MF	(United States) Lindsey Horan	Lyon
MF	(France) Léa Le Garrec	Fleury
FW	(France) Delphine Cascarino	Lyon
FW	(France) Kadidiatou Diani	Paris Saint-Germain
FW	(Ivory Coast) Rosemonde Kouassi	Fleury

=== FFF D1 Arkema Awards ===
Nominations for the Goal of the Season were announced on 6 May 2023. Other nominations were announced on 7 May. Winners along with Team of the Season were announced on 15 May.

Note: Winners are displayed in boldface.

==== Best Player ====
Player	Club
(France) Delphine Cascarino	Lyon
(France) **Kadidiatou Diani**	**Paris Saint-Germain**
(France) Grace Geyoro	Paris Saint-Germain

==== Best Young Player ====
Player	Club
(Haiti) **Melchie Dumornay**	**Reims**
(France) Laurina Fazer	Paris Saint-Germain
(France) Aïrine Fontaine	Fleury

==== Best Goalkeeper ====
Player	Club
(Chile) **Christiane Endler**	**Lyon**
(Nigeria) Chiamaka Nnadozie	Paris FC
(France) Laëtitia Philippe	Le Havre

==== Best Manager ====
Manager	Club
(France) Fabrice Abriel	Fleury
(France) **Sonia Bompastor**	**Lyon**
(France) Gérard Prêcheur	Paris Saint-Germain

==== Goal of the Season ====
Player	Club
(France) Christy Gavory	Le Havre
(Netherlands) **Lieke Martens**	**Paris Saint-Germain**
(France) Faustine Robert	Montpellier
(France) Madeline Roth	Dijon

==== Team of the Season ====
Position	Player	Club
GK	(Chile) Christiane Endler	Lyon
DF	(Australia) Ellie Carpenter	Lyon
DF	(France) Wendie Renard	Lyon
DF	(France) Élisa De Almeida	Paris Saint-Germain
DF	(France) Sakina Karchaoui	Paris Saint-Germain
MF	(France) Grace Geyoro	Paris Saint-Germain
MF	(Haiti) Melchie Dumornay	Reims
MF	(France) Léa Le Garrec	Fleury
FW	(France) Delphine Cascarino	Lyon
FW	(France) Kadidiatou Diani	Paris Saint-Germain
FW	(Ivory Coast) Rosemonde Kouassi	Fleury
