= Maëlle Garbino =

French footballer (born 1996)

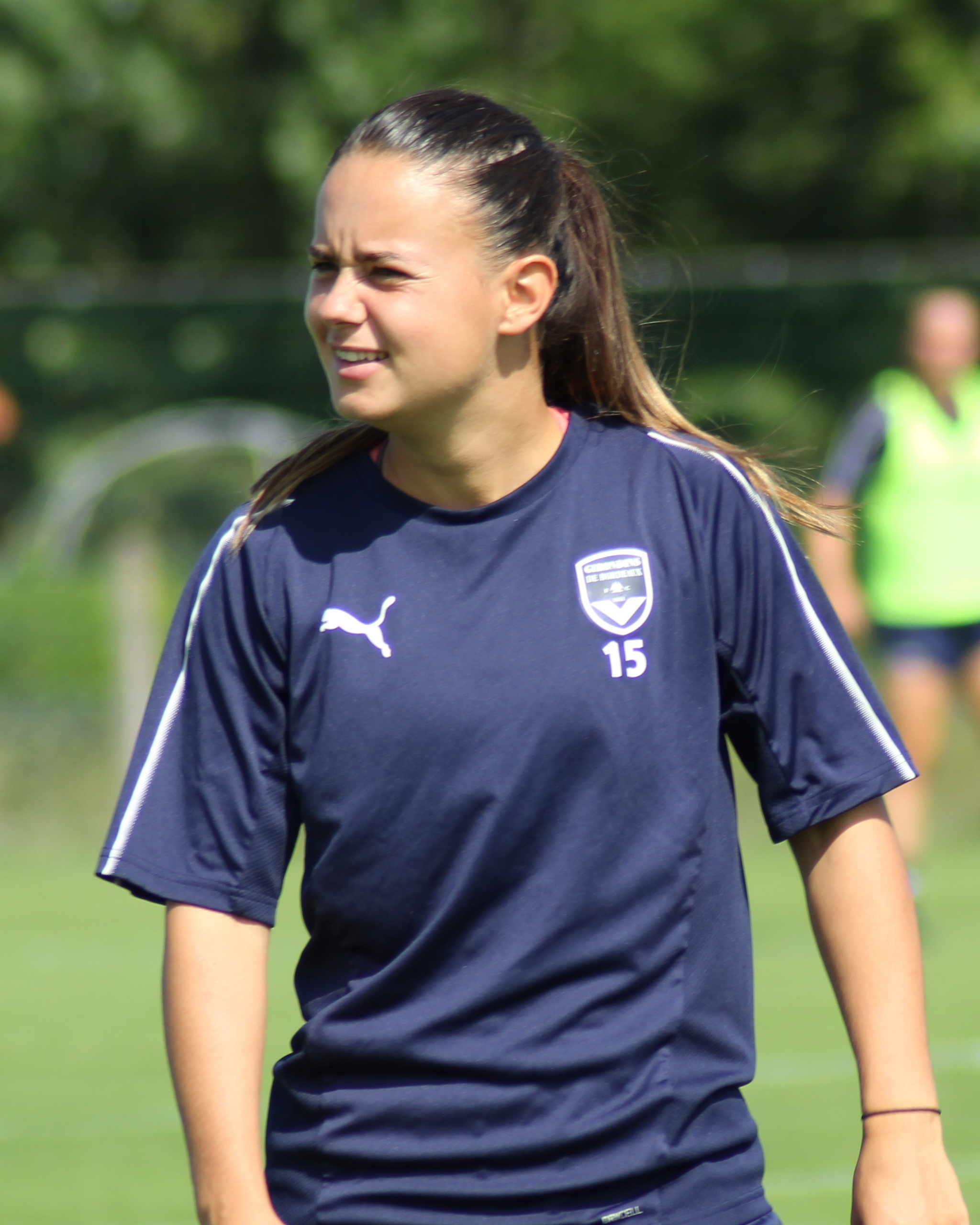
- Garbino with Bordeaux in 2019

Personal information
- Full name: Maëlle Antonia Garbino
- Date of birth: 9 August 1996 (age 30)
- Place of birth: Vienne, France
- Height: 1.61 m (5 ft 3 in)
- Positions: Attacking midfielder; winger

Team information
- Current team: Marseille
- Number: 23

Youth career
- 2004–2008: FC Saint-Ronain-en-Gal
- 2008–2014: Lyon

Senior career*
Years	Team	Apps	(Gls)
2014–2016	Lyon	5	(0)
2016–2018	Saint-Étienne	21	(7)
2018–2023	Bordeaux	97	(21)
2023–2024	Juventus	20	(3)
2024–2026	Paris FC	40	(16)
2026–	Marseille	9	(0)

International career
2015	France U19	12	(3)
2016	France U20	7	(0)
Medal record
Representing France
Women's football
FIFA U-20 Women's World Cup
Runner-up	2016 Papua New Guinea
- * Club domestic league appearances and goals as of 20 November 2026

Maëlle Antonia Garbino (born 9 August 1996) is a French professional footballer who plays as an attacking midfielder or winger for Première Ligue club Les Marseillaises. She has previously played for Lyon, Saint-Étienne, Bordeaux, Paris FC, and in Italy for Juventus.

== Club career ==
Garbino made her league debut for Lyon against Arras on 30 November 2014.

Garbino made her league debut for Saint-Étienne against Rodez on 11 September 2016. She scored her first league goal against Bordeaux on 25 September 2016, scoring in the 72nd minute.

Garbino joined Bordeaux in June 2018. In April 2021, she won the D1 Player of the Month for February 2021. Garbino scored two goals against Stade de Reims and a hattrick against Le Havre to win the award. She started the 2022–23 Division 1 Féminine season strongly, scoring a brace against Le Havre. The following week, she scored a goal against Dijon, and in October she scored a brace over Guingamp. Garbino won the Player of the Month award for September 2022. She also won the Player of the Month award for November 2022. Garbino left Bourdeaux after playing more than 100 matches and scoring 22 goals in all competitions.

On 8 June 2023, Garbino joined Juventus on a two-year deal until June 2025. She scored on her league debut against Sampdoria on 1 October 2023, scoring in the 20th minute. She left Juventus after playing 26 matches and scoring 6 goals.

On 15 July 2024, Garbino was transferred to Paris FC on a two-year contract until June 2026. She scored on her league debut against Guingamp on 22 September 2024, scoring in the 20th minute. Garbino was nominated for the September 2024 Player of the Month award.

Following the expiration of her contract at Paris FC, Garbino joined Les Marseillaises on a free transfer.

== International career ==
Garbino has represented France at various youth levels. In November 2022, she received her first call-up to the France national team.

== Honours ==
Paris FC

- Coupe de France Féminine: 2024–25

France U20

- FIFA U-20 Women's World Cup runner-up: 2016

Individual

- UEFA Women's Under-19 Championship team of the tournament: 2015
- Première Ligue Player of the Month: February 2021, September 2022, November 2022
