= Christiane Endler =

Chilean footballer (born 1991)

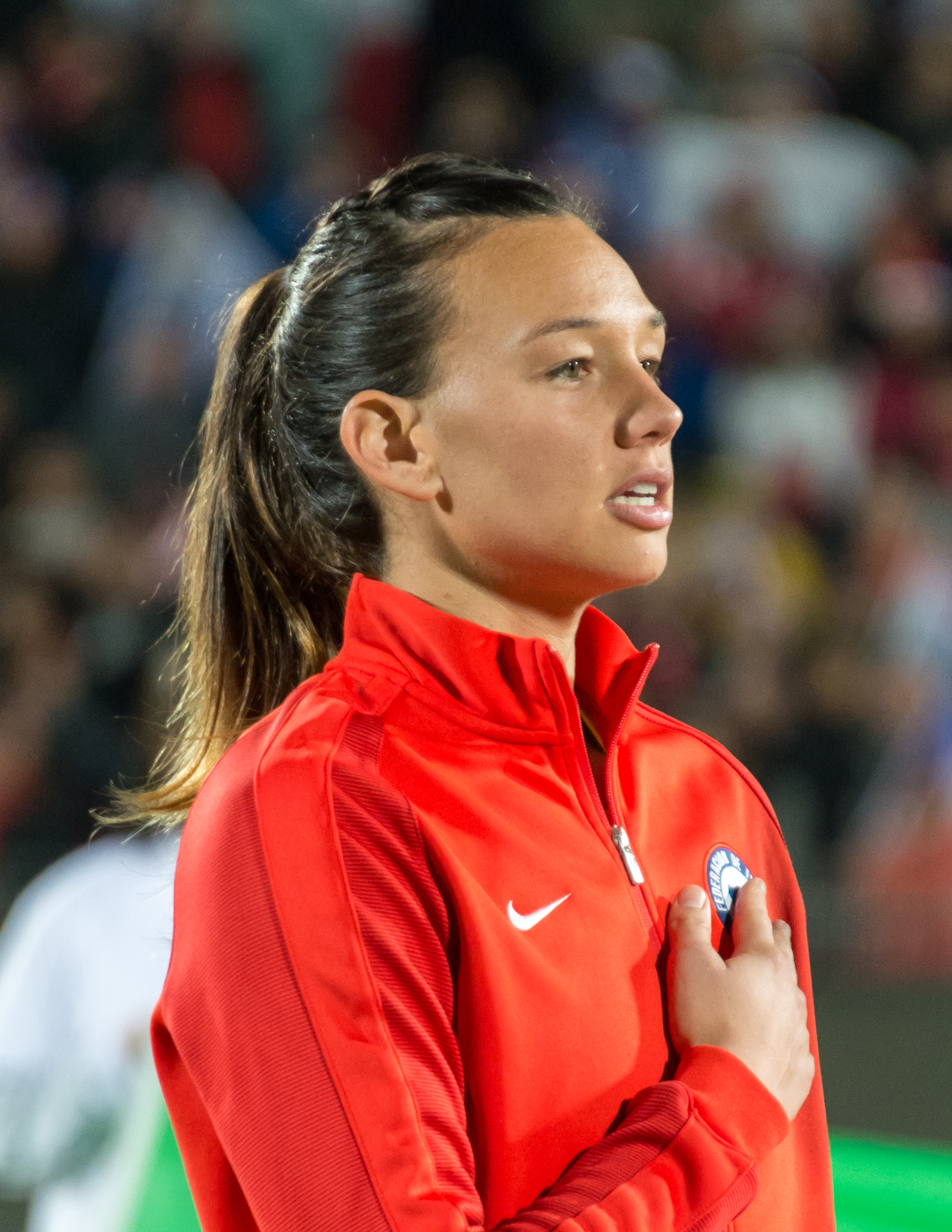
- Endler in 2019

Personal information
- Full name: Claudia Christiane Endler Mutinelli
- Date of birth: 23 July 1991 (age 35)
- Place of birth: Santiago, Chile
- Height: 1.82 m (6 ft 0 in)
- Position: Goalkeeper

Team information
- Current team: Lyon
- Number: 1

College career
Years	Team	Apps	(Gls)
2012–2014	South Florida Bulls	38	(0)

Senior career*
Years	Team	Apps	(Gls)
2008–2009	Unión La Calera		
2010	Everton		
2011–2012	Colo-Colo		
2014	Chelsea	3	(0)
2015–2016	Colo-Colo		
2016–2017	Valencia	23	(0)
2017–2021	Paris Saint-Germain	52	(0)
2021–	Lyon	68	(0)

International career
2008	Chile U-20	3	(0)
2009–	Chile	111	(0)
Medal record
Women's football
Representing Chile
Pan American Games
Silver medal – second place	2023 Santiago	Team
South American Games
Silver medal – second place	2014 Santiago	Team
- * Club domestic league appearances and goals as of 17 April 2025

Claudia Christiane Endler Mutinelli (born 23 July 1991) is a Chilean professional footballer who plays as goalkeeper for Première Ligue club Lyon. She has previously played for Colo-Colo, Valencia, Paris Saint-Germain, and the University of South Florida.

Endler is widely regarded as one of the best goalkeepers in the world. In all seasons from 2019 to 2022 she was among the three finalists nominated for Best Women's Goalkeeper at the Best FIFA Football Awards. She won the award in 2021.

== Early life ==
Endler was born in Santiago, Chile, to a Chilean mother with Italian ancestry and a German father. From childhood, Endler showed talent for sports, playing tennis, swimming, hockey, basketball, volleyball, and gymnastics before dedicating herself full time to football. At 10 years old, she went to her first football club, Stadio Italiano, and as a teenager she attended a German high school where she started to get formal football training. Throughout her youth, she played as a forward, but when she was 15, Endler had trials with the Chile U17 national team. Because of her height, former Chilean goalkeeper and then-coach Marco Cornez advised her to switch her position to goalkeeper. At 17 years old, she started playing semi-professionally with Unión La Calera's women's team. She spent two years with the club where she finished fifth and sixth in the league table, respectively.

== College career ==
During the 2011 Pan American Games, she was recruited to play in the United States for the D1 University of South Florida Bulls. After three years of playing semi-professionally in Chile, Endler departed the country in July 2011 to attend college for two years. She was enrolled on a scholarship and at first studied physical education, but switched her major to instead study business administration. It was there that she learned English. In 2012, she started all 19 games and throughout the season recorded 83 saves with an .847 (84.7%) save percentage. She also recorded nine shutouts and was named Big East goalkeeper of the week twice and Big East freshman of the week once. In 2013 she was named to the second team for the AAC and was named AAC goalkeeper of the week three times. That same season she had an .806 (80.6%) save percentage and a career-high 87 saves for the season. In 2014, she helped lead the Bulls to a regular season conference championship.

During her fall break in 2012, Colo-Colo were playing the Copa Libertadores, so she very briefly went on loan to compete in the beginning stages of the tournament.

== Club career ==
=== 2009–2010: Beginnings with Everton ===
In 2009, Endler participated in the first ever edition of the Copa Libertadores Femenina. In 2010, Endler reached her first ever Copa Libertadores final with Everton de Viña del Mar, where she would play Santos, a team that contacted her to play the year before. Everton was the first ever Chilean team to make the final of an international women's tournament. Endler held off the tournament's most effective attack for most of the match, but conceded in the 89th minute. Santos won 1-0 and took the title, their second in a row.

=== 2011–2012: Establishing herself with Colo-Colo ===
In 2011, after impressing at the previous year's Copa America, she was signed to Chilean team Colo-Colo. In 2011, Endler participated in her second consecutive and Colo-Colo's first Copa Libertadores final, where they fell to São José Esporte Clube. The following month in June, she announced her departure from Colo-Colo, opting to go to the United States and pursue a college education.

In 2012, while still in college, Endler took advantage of her brief fall break to participate in her third Libertadores final in a row. Luckily for her, the match went to penalties after regulation time. Endler had anticipated the probability of a penalty shootout and reviewed strategy with her coach the day before. To end the shootout, she stopped the final penalty and won her first Copa Libertadores title. Along with Santos, Colo-Colo became the only other club to win both the Men's and Women's Copa Libertadores. Chilean publication Dale Albo cites this victory as a turning point for women's football in Chile, allowing other women's clubs to establish themselves and find success in the tournament.

=== 2014: Short-lived stint with Chelsea ===
In 2014, Endler was signed by Chelsea. She made her WSL Cup debut in a 5–1 win against Watford and was in goal for another WSL Cup against Millwall. Endler was having a convincing start to her season, but due to the newfound intensity of training and workouts, she began feeling discomfort in her knee that developed into a season-ending ruptured meniscus injury. Chelsea offered to extend Endler's contract, but she believed the contract didn't offer enough to sustain the expensive cost of living in England. After playing only 3 games in the WSL that season, she returned to Chile for a year to rediscover her love for football.

=== 2015–2016: Brief return to Colo-Colo ===
Following her exit from England, she came back to Chile, where her options were to go to Santiago Morning or return to Colo-Colo. She ended up returning to Colo-Colo. It was with Colo-Colo where she regained her confidence, winning the Campeonato Apertura and returning to her fourth Copa Libertadores final in 2015.

=== 2016–2017: Season-long stay with Valencia ===
The following season, she was signed by Valencia. In week 24 of the season, she was awarded player of the week for her clean sheet performance against Santa Teresa CD. By the end of the 2016-2017 season, Valencia conceded the fewest goals in the league and finished third overall, qualifying for the 2017 Copa de la Reina de Fútbol. She was awarded the Zamora Trophy for conceding only 11 goals throughout the league campaign. She was the first foreign player in the Primera División to receive the award. She also was named to La Liga's team of the season by a fan vote of 5,400.

=== 2017–2021: Rise to international fame with PSG ===
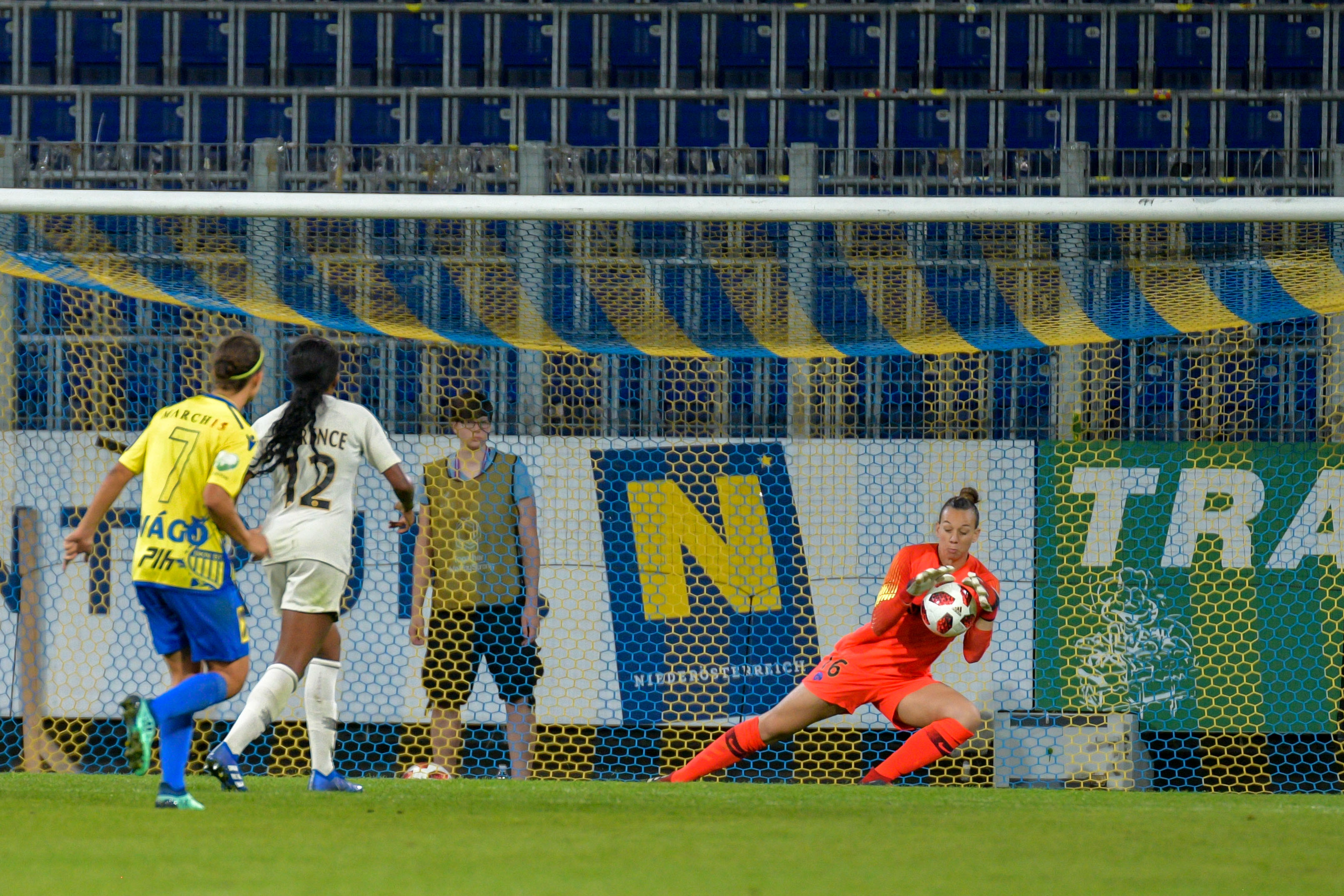
Endler making a save against SKN ST Pölten in the UWCL

Her performances with Valencia attracted the attention of Paris Saint-Germain, and in July 2017, Endler signed a three-year contract with the French club. The transfer was Valencia's first involving money, valued at 30,000 Euros. She officially debuted in the league for PSG in a 1–0 win against ASPTT Albi. After sharing goalkeeping duties with Katarzyna Kiedrzynek for the first half of the season, she started every league game in the second half of the season. Her only loss as a starter that season came against rivals Lyon. At the end of the 2017–18 Division 1 Féminine, PSG finished in second place, 8 points behind Lyon. Endler conceded just five goals and recorded seven shutouts in 11 matches for that campaign. She signed a contract extension later in 2018 that continued to June 2021.

Endler had a decisive performance in the 2018 Coupe de France Féminine final, making important saves against Shanice van de Sanden and Dzsenifer Marozsán. PSG won the match 1-0 and earned their second ever major trophy, breaking Lyon's streak of six consecutive Coupe de France Féminine titles. By the end of the 2018-2019 season, Endler conceded just 13 goals in 20 games, maintained the second-best defense in the French league, and was voted the best keeper of the French league in 2019.

Their second-place league finish in 2018 meant Endler was set to make her Champion's League debut the following season. Her debut came in the Round of 32 against Austrian team SKN ST Pölten, where PSG won the match 4-1 and won the tie 6–1 on aggregate. Endler's first Champions League campaign ended in a cruel fashion, where she conceded a 91st-minute goal from Maren Mjelde and lost the quarterfinal tie to her former club, Chelsea.

For her performances with PSG and Chile, she received the second-most votes for 2019 The Best FIFA Goalkeeper awards behind Dutch goalkeeper Sari van Veenendaal.

On 9 August 2020, Endler saved a penalty from Eugénie Le Sommer during the shootout that decided the 2020 Coupe de France but subsequently missed one that she took as PSG ultimately lost to Lyon.

Endler and PSG dominated the 2020–21 season, finishing undefeated with 20 victories and 2 draws; Endler allowed her opponents only 4 goals the entire season. PSG dethroned Lyon's 14-year run of championships, securing PSG's first-ever title in French league on 4 June 2021, the final day of the domestic season.

Shortly thereafter, Endler announced she would not renew her contract with PSG. In January 2022, she was named 2021 Women's Goalkeeper of the Year at the annual FIFA Awards Ceremony.

=== 2022–present: Glory with Lyon ===
On 21 June 2021, Lyon announced the signing of Endler to a three-year contract. With Endler serving as the goalkeeper, the French giant won the 2022 UEFA Women's Champions League Final by beating Barcelona 3–1, making her the first-ever Chilean to win the Women's Champions League.

== International career ==
=== Youth teams ===
In 2008, Endler participated in the first ever edition of the U17 Copa America, hosted in Chile. She was a regular starter, playing all four games of Chile's campaign as they finished third in Group A with five points and exited the tournament.

Endler's second international tournament experience came as a 17-year-old when Chile hosted the 2008 FIFA U-20 World Cup. Prior to the tournament, her starting position was disputed between her and then-Colo-Colo goalkeeper Romina Parraguirre. Endler ended up establishing herself as a starter and played every minute of each of Chile's three group stage matches. Chile finished last in their group and 14th overall, but Endler impressed enough to make the Team of the Tournament.

Ten years later, in an interview with FIFA, Endler said that the tournament was crucial in her decision to dedicate her life to football.

Before that championship I'd never imagined that I could play the game professionally, but it was thanks to that tournament that I realised there was a whole different world out there, that women's football was growing outside Chile.

Her final international youth tournament experience would come in the 2010 U20 Copa America, where Endler found greater success. She conceded just two goals in the four-round group stage as she moved onto the knockout rounds of an international tournament for the first time in her career. Chile were defeated 3–1 by Brazil in the semifinals and 6–0 by Paraguay in the third place match, giving them a fourth place overall finish in the tournament.

=== Senior team ===
==== 2009–2016: Navigating neglect from the federation ====
Endler's international debut for Chile's senior team came against Mexico on November 11, 2009, when she was 18.

At the 2010 Copa America, Chile finished in third place, their best since 1995, but still did not qualify for either the 2011 World Cup or the 2012 Olympics. They did, however, qualify for the 2011 Pan American Games. Endler won goalkeeper of the tournament. At next year's Pan American Games, Endler conceded only one goal in three games, but Chile only recorded 4 points, exiting the tournament in the group stage.

For the 2014 Copa America, Chile went into the tournament with zero preparation matches and subsequently finished fourth in Group B, where they did not qualify for any upcoming competitive international tournaments.

Throughout the 2010s, there were many times the Chile women's national team did not have official games scheduled, prompting FIFA to deem them inactive and strip the team of their FIFA ranking. In 2011, Chile federation president Harold Mayne-Nicholls resigned, which Endler believes was a turn for the worse for women's football in Chile. His successor, Sergio Jadue, who was later banned for life by the FIFA Ethics Committee due to his participation in the 2015 FIFA corruption case, completely neglected women's football in Chile. The Chile women's national team was forced to play in "deplorable conditions' and train with teenage boys. Under Jadue's successor, Arturo Salah, the team received no information about new matches between 2015 and 2017.

==== 2016–2018: Establishment of ANJUFF ====
In 2016, Chile dropped out of the FIFA rankings again, just a year after achieving their best ranking of 41 in 2015. Former footballer and Chilean international Iona Rothfeld, Endler, and a few other Chilean teammates created the ANJUFF (Asociación Nacional de Jugadoras de Fútbol), a Chilean women's footballing union to combat neglect from their federation. ANJUFF received recognition from Chile's athletic unions and FIFPro, and was one of the first efforts to unionize female athletes in Latin America. Chile made their competitive return in May 2017, where Endler captained her side to a triumphant 12–0 win over Peru.

==== 2018–2019: Chile's first Women's World Cup ====
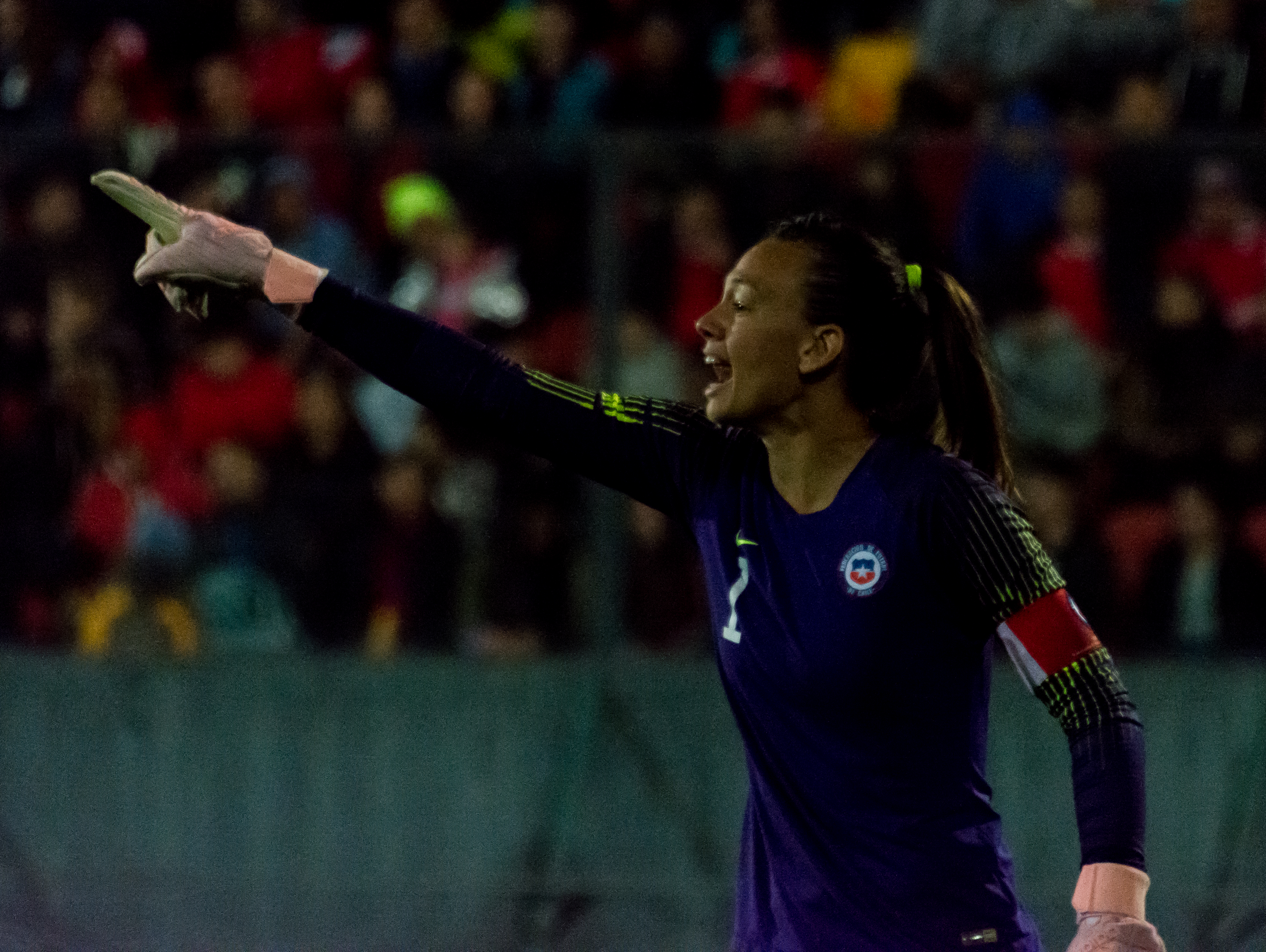
Endler with Chile in 2018 during a match against South Africa

In 2018, thanks to the efforts of ANJUFF, Chile hosted the 2018 Copa América Femenina. Endler captained her side to a second-place finish in Group A, only letting in 2 goals in 5 games. In the final stage, Chile came in second behind Brazil, becoming runners-up in the tournament and qualifying them for their first ever FIFA Women's World Cup. With this finish, Chile would also be given the chance to qualify for the 2020 Olympics in a CAF-CONMEBOL qualification playoff. Endler has criticized the CONMEBOL qualifying format, where the quadrennial competition determines qualification for three separate competitions- the FIFA World Cup, the Olympics, and the Pan-American Games.

At the 2019 World Cup, Endler was the captain and highest capped player on Chile's roster. She played every minute of Chile's three group stage matches, making thirteen total saves. In the second group match, Chile played number 1 ranked USWNT who had twenty-six attempts on goal and 9 on target throughout the match. Endler made six saves and despite conceding three goals, her performances against the eventual tournament winners earned herself a Player of the Match award and garnered international attention. In the final match of the group stage with Round of 16 qualification on the line, Chile played Thailand who, a week before, suffered the highest ever margin of defeat in a World Cup tournament, women or men. Endler recorded a shutout in that match, helping her team to their first ever win in a World Cup tournament. Chile finished third in Group F and very narrowly exited the tournament by not having enough points nor a high enough goal-difference to be one of the third placed teams that could qualify for the Round of 16. Endler questioned Chile coach José Letelier's decisions in the match against Thailand, saying in a post-match interview that she expected players with more experience to get more game time.

In September 2019, Endler won her first title with Chile, the 2019 Torneo Internacional Femenino de São Paulo friendly championship. In the final, they drew with Brazil and in extra time defeated them on penalties, where Endler saved the first penalty, missed a penalty that she took, and then saved another. This was Chile's first time in 13 matches against Brazil where they didn't lose. Endler did not concede a single goal throughout the tournament.

==== 2021: Chile's first Olympics ====
On 13 April 2021, Chile became the final women's team to qualify for the postponed 2020 Tokyo Olympics by defeating Cameroon in a pair of matches held in Ankara, Turkey due to COVID travel restrictions.

On 21 April 2021, Chile was drawn into Group E where they will face Great Britain, Canada, and host nation Japan in their round-robin matches on 21/24/27 July 2021; Endler will captain.

==== 2023: Pan American Games ====
She made four appearances at the 2023 Pan American Games, where Chile won the silver medal. At the end of the semi-final match against the United States, she announced her retirement from the national team.

== Style of play ==
In the official FIFA report for the 2008 FIFA U-20 World Cup she was listed as one of Chile's standout players, describing her as a "complete, solid all-round goalkeeper with commanding presence, good basic technique who starts build-up play quickly."

After her performance against the USWNT, well-respected American soccer journalist Grant Wahl called her performance "astonishing," saying that "Christen Press will see (Endler) in her nightmares." Former United States goalkeeper Hope Solo described her as "spectacular," "one-in-a-million," and "strong, powerful and quick with excellent positioning ...her ability to read the aerial balls is also top notch. She is a complete goalkeeper."

== Personal life ==
Endler holds both Chilean and German citizenship, and can speak Spanish, Portuguese, English, German and a bit of French.

Due to her German and Italian heritage, her hero and idol as a child was German footballer and former Bayern Munich goalkeeper Oliver Kahn and Italian former goalkeeper Gianluigi Buffon. Nevertheless, she doesn't speak Italian. She also admired Iker Casillas. She cites her biggest inspiration as her brother, who instilled a passion for football in her since a young age and pushed her to become a goalkeeper.

Endler has expressed her support for the 2019–20 Chilean protests, saying on Instagram that she was "proud to see it."

She married Sofía Orozco, who is the daughter of the Chilean singer Cristóbal (stage name of Marco Antonio Orozco), in France in May 2021. They became mothers on 4 March 2026.

== Honours ==
South Florida Bulls

- American Athletic Conference regular season: 2014

Everton

- Copa Chile Femenina: 2010
- Copa Libertadores Femenina runner-up: 2010

Colo-Colo

- Chilean League Apertura: 2011, 2015
- Chilean League Clausura: 2011, 2012
- Copa Libertadores Femenina: 2012 runner-up: 2011, 2015,

Paris Saint-Germain

- Division 1 Féminine: 2020–21
- Coupe de France Féminine: 2017–18

Lyon

- Division 1 Féminine: 2021–22, 2022-23
- UEFA Women's Champions League: 2021–22
- Trophée des Championnes: 2022
- Coupe de France Féminine: 2022–23

Chile

- Copa América Femenina runner-up: 2018
- Torneo Internacional Femenino de São Paulo: 2019 runner-up: 2013
- Pan American Games Silver Medal: 2023

Individual

- American Athletic Conference Second Team: 2013
- FIFA U-20 Women's World Cup All-Star Team: 2008
- Copa América Femenina Goalkeeper of the Tournament: 2010
- Copa Libertadores Femenina Goalkeeper of the Tournament: 2011
- Zamora Trophy: 2017
- ANFP Chilean Footballer of the Year: 2008, 2009, 2010, 2015, 2017, 2018, 2019, 2021, 2022
- IFFHS Women's World Best Goalkeeper: 2021, 2022
- The Best FIFA Goalkeeper: 2021 (Finalist - 2019, 2020, 2022)
- FIFA FIFPro Women's World11: 2020, 2021, 2022
- IFFHS CONMEBOL Woman Team of the Decade 2011–2020
- IFFHS Women's World Team: 2021, 2022
- UEFA Women's Champions League Squad of the Season: 2019–20, 2020–21, 2021–22, 2023–24
- Trophées UNFP du football Goalkeeper of the Year: 2020–21, 2021–22
- Trophées UNFP du football Team of the Year: 2020–21, 2021–22
- Trophées FFF D1 Féminine Team of the Year: 2020–21, 2021–22
- Trophées FFF D1 Féminine Goalkeeper of the Year: 2018–19, 2020–21, 2021–22

=== Awards and recognition ===
In 2018, Endler was named to The Guardian's list of top 100 women footballers in the world for the first time, ranking at 52 as the second-best goalkeeper on the list. The same year, the IFFHS voted her as the sixth-best goalkeeper in the world.

For her outstanding play against the United States during the 2019 FIFA World Cup, she was voted Player of the Match. Following the match, legendary goalkeeper Hope Solo went on record to say that Endler "sets the bar very high" and "she shows what goalkeeping should be." She also referred to a quote made by Chelsea coach Emma Hayes that women should have smaller pitches and goals. Solo cited Endler as an example of why that sentiment is "unbelievable." Former USMNT defender Alexi Lalas titled her "the best in the world." Paraguay goalkeeper José Luis Chilavert also acclaimed Endler as the best female goalkeeper in the world, praising her charisma, confidence and leadership. Later in the year, she was voted the fifth-best women's goalkeeper of 2019 by IFFHS, behind Sari van Veenendaal, Sarah Bouhaddi, Alyssa Naeher and Hedvig Lindahl. In their brief profile of her, IFFHS predicted that she had the potential to be the best goalkeeper in the world in later years. Endler was also a nominee for the 2019 FIFPRO FIFA Women's World 11.

In 2019, The Guardian listed her as the twenty-fourth best player and second-best goalkeeper in the world in their annual list of the top 100 players, going up 28 ranks from the previous year's list.

Then in 2020, The Guardian listed her as the twenty-second best female player and best female goalkeeper in the world in their annual list of the top 100 players.

In January 2022, she was named the 2021 Best FIFA Women's Goalkeeper.

== See also ==
- List of women's footballers with 100 or more international caps
