= Grace Geyoro =

French footballer (born 1997)

- Geyoro in 2026

Personal information
- Full name: Onema Grace Geyoro
- Date of birth: 2 July 1997 (age 29)
- Place of birth: Kolwezi, DR Congo
- Height: 1.66 m (5 ft 5 in)
- Position: Midfielder

Team information
- Current team: London City Lionesses
- Number: 88

Youth career
- 2005–2012: SMOC St Jean-de-Braye
- 2012–2016: Paris Saint-Germain

Senior career*
Years	Team	Apps	(Gls)
2014–2025	Paris Saint-Germain	175	(40)
2025–	London City Lionesses	29	(2)

International career^{‡}
2012	France U16	4	(0)
2012–2013	France U17	5	(0)
2015–2016	France U19	20	(4)
2016	France U20	8	(1)
2017–	France	114	(24)
Medal record
Women's football
Representing France
UEFA Women's Nations League
Runner-up	2024
Third place	2025
FIFA U-20 Women's World Cup
Runner-up	2016 Papua New Guinea
UEFA Women's Under-19 Championship
Winner	2016 Slovakia
FIFA U-17 Women's World Cup
Winner	2012 Azerbaijan
- * Club domestic league appearances and goals as of 8 November 2026 ‡ National team caps and goals as of 10 October 2026

Onema Grace Geyoro (born 2 July 1997) is a professional footballer who plays as a midfielder for Women's Super League club London City Lionesses. Born in the Democratic Republic of the Congo, she plays for the France national team.

== Club career ==
=== Youth ===
Geyoro was born in Kolwezi and moved with her family from the Democratic Republic of the Congo to France when she was a baby. At the age of eight, she started playing with the boys of SMOC St Jean-de-Braye, based in Orléans. She was recognised with an award of distinction, along with 26 other people, by the Regional Olympic and Sports Committee of Orléans in January 2013.

=== Paris Saint-Germain ===
In 2012, at the age of 15, Geyoro joined the youth department of Paris Saint-Germain. She made her debut for Paris Saint-Germain's senior team in October 2014 in a 2–0 victory over Issy, coming on as a substitute for Fatmire Alushi in the 76th minute. In March 2017, she signed a contract extension until June 2021.

On 27 May 2018, Geyoro scored her first goals for Paris Saint-Germain, netting a brace in a 3–0 victory over Soyaux which guaranteed the club a spot in the 2018–19 UEFA Women's Champions League. On 15 September 2023, she signed a contract extension with the club until June 2028.

=== London City Lionesses ===
On 5 September 2025, Geyoro joined newly promoted Women's Super League club London City Lionesses on a world record fee of £1.4m. On 26 April 2026, she scored her first goal for the club in a 5–1 home win against Leicester City.

== International career ==
=== Youth ===
In July 2012, Geyoro represented France under-16 at the 2012 Nordic Under-16 Cup. She played full matches in the 1–0 loss to Sweden, the 4–0 victory over Iceland, and the 3–0 victory over Norway. In the 5–1 victory over Finland she came on as a 52nd-minute substitute.

In March 2013, Geyoro represented France under-17 in the second round of the 2013 UEFA Women's Under-17 Championship qualification campaign, making one appearance as a substitute in the 2–0 victory over Finland.

In July 2015, Geyoro represented France under-19 at the 2015 UEFA Women's Under-19 Championship. In the group stage, she played full matches in the 1–0 victory over Denmark and in the 1–0 victory over Sweden, but sat on the bench for the 4–0 victory over Israel. She also sat on the bench for the semi-final against Spain, which France lost 5–4 in a penalty shoot-out.

In September 2015, Geyoro represented France under-19 in the qualifying round of the 2016 UEFA Women's Under-19 Championship. She played a full match in the 2–0 victory over Bosnia and Herzegovina, came on as a substitute in the 70th minute of the 7–0 victory over Faroe Islands, and played a full match and scored a goal in the 6–0 victory over Czech Republic. In April 2016, she was in France's squad for the elite qualification round, playing a full match in the 3–0 victory over Portugal and starting and scoring in the 2–0 victory over Scotland. In July 2016, played with France under-19 in the 2016 UEFA Women's Under-19 Championship. In the group stage she played all three matches, starting in the 1–0 loss to Norway, in the 6–0 victory over Slovakia, and in the 2–1 victory over Netherlands in which she scored the second goal. She played the full match of the semi-final 3–1 victory over Switzerland, and scored the first goal in the 2–1 victory over Spain in the final.

In March 2016 France under-19 competed in the 2016 La Manga Women Tournament, in which Geyoro started in the 2–1 victory over Norway, came on as a substitute in the 3–1 victory over Italy, and scored the only goal in the 1–0 victory over Sweden.

In November 2016, Geyoro was selected for France's squad for the 2016 FIFA U-20 Women's World Cup. She played in a friendly against Canada in Australia ahead of the tournament. In the tournament's group stage she played all 3 matches, with France drawing 0–0 against the United States and 2–2 against Ghana, before beating New Zealand 2–0 to qualify for the next stage. In the knock-out stage she played the full matches in the quarter-final 1–0 victory over Germany and in the semi-final 2–1 victory over Japan. In the final, Geyoro played the full match against North Korea and scored France's only goal in the 3–1 defeat. She was one of the only players to play every minute of the tournament.

=== Senior ===
On 22 January 2017, Geyoro debuted for the French senior team in a 2–0 friendly win over South Africa, coming on as a substitute for Sandie Toletti in the 69th minute. In March 2017, she represented France at the 2017 SheBelieves Cup, playing full matches in the 2–1 victory over England and in the 0–0 draw with Germany. In July 2017, she was selected for France's squad for UEFA Women's Euro 2017 and was the youngest player in the squad. She played full matches in the group stage 1–1 draws against Austria and Switzerland, as well as the 1–0 quarter-final loss to England. In March 2018, she represented France at the 2018 SheBelieves Cup, playing full matches in the 1–1 draw with the United States and in the 3–0 victory over Germany. On 4 March 2019, she scored her debut goal for the French senior team, converting the 4th goal in France's 6–0 victory over Uruguay.

Geyoro was called up to the France squad for the 2019 FIFA Women's World Cup. On 30 May 2022, Geyoro was called up to the France squad for the UEFA Women's Euro 2022. Geyoro was called up to the France squad for the 2023 FIFA Women's World Cup.

In July 2024, Geyoro was named in France's squad for the 2024 Olympics. On 5 July 2025, Geyoro received her 100th cap in a 2–1 victory over England at the UEFA Women's Euro 2025.

== Career statistics ==
=== Club ===
As of match played 8 November 2026

Appearances and goals by club, season and competition
Club	Season	League			National cup (Note: Includes Coupe de France Féminine, Women's FA Cup)		League cup (Note: Includes WSL Players Cup)		Continental		Other		Total	
Club	Season	Division	Apps	Goals	Apps	Goals	Apps	Goals	Apps	Goals	Apps	Goals	Apps	Goals
Paris Saint-Germain	2014–15	Première Ligue	1	0	0	0	—		0	0	—		1	0
Paris Saint-Germain	2015–16	Première Ligue	6	0	1	0	—		1 (Note: Appearance(s) in UEFA Women's Champions League)	0	—		8	0
Paris Saint-Germain	2016–17	Première Ligue	17	0	4	0	—		6	0	—		27	0
Paris Saint-Germain	2017–18	Première Ligue	19	2	5	0	—		—		—		24	2
Paris Saint-Germain	2018–19	Première Ligue	22	3	3	1	—		5	0	—		30	4
Paris Saint-Germain	2019–20	Première Ligue	16	6	4	1	—		3	0	1 (Note: Appearance in Trophée des Championnes)	0	24	7
Paris Saint-Germain	2020–21	Première Ligue	17	3	1	0	—		6	1	—		24	4
Paris Saint-Germain	2021–22	Première Ligue	19	4	5	1	—		9	1	—		33	6
Paris Saint-Germain	2022–23	Première Ligue	21	5	4	1	—		9	1	1	0	35	7
Paris Saint-Germain	2023–24	Première Ligue	19	11	3	1	—		12	2	3 (Note: One appearance in Trophée des Championnes; two appearances, one goal in playoffs)	1	37	15
Paris Saint-Germain	2024–25	Première Ligue	18	6	5	2	—		2	0	2 (Note: Appearances in playoffs)	0	27	8
Paris Saint-Germain	Total		175	40	35	7	0	0	53	5	7	1	270	53
London City Lionesses	2025–26	WSL	20	1	2	0	2	0	—		—		24	1
London City Lionesses	2026–27	WSL	9	1	0	0	4	0	—		—		13	1
London City Lionesses	Total		29	2	2	0	6	0	0	0	0	0	37	2
Career total			204	42	37	7	6	0	53	5	7	1	307	55

=== International ===
As of match played 10 October 2026

Appearances and goals by national team and year
National team	Year	Apps	Goals
France	2017	12	0
France	2018	5	0
France	2019	11	2
France	2020	7	2
France	2021	10	3
France	2022	14	6
France	2023	17	4
France	2024	15	0
France	2025	16	6
France	2026	7	1
Total		114	24

Scores and results list France's goal tally first, score column indicates score after each Geyoro goal.

List of international goals scored by Grace Geyoro
No.	Date	Venue	Opponent	Score	Result	Competition
1	4 March 2019	Stade de la Vallée du Cher, Tours, France	Uruguay	4–0	6–0	Friendly
2	9 November 2019	Matmut Atlantique, Bordeaux, France	Serbia	3–0	6–0	2022 UEFA Women's Euro qualification
3	23 October 2020	Stade de la Source, Orléans, France	North Macedonia	7–0	11–0	2022 UEFA Women's Euro qualification
4	23 October 2020	Stade de la Source, Orléans, France	North Macedonia	8–0	11–0	2022 UEFA Women's Euro qualification
5	17 September 2021	Pampeloponnisiako Stadium, Patras, Greece	Greece	2–0	10–0	2023 FIFA Women's World Cup qualification
6	17 September 2021	Pampeloponnisiako Stadium, Patras, Greece	Greece	7–0	10–0	2023 FIFA Women's World Cup qualification
7	22 October 2021	Stade Dominique Duvauchelle, Créteil, France	Estonia	1–0	11–0	2023 FIFA Women's World Cup qualification
8	16 February 2022	Stade Océane, Le Havre, France	Finland	4–0	5–0	2022 Tournoi de France
9	10 July 2022	New York Stadium, Rotherham, England	Italy	1–0	5–1	UEFA Women's Euro 2022
10	10 July 2022	New York Stadium, Rotherham, England	Italy	4–0	5–1	UEFA Women's Euro 2022
11	10 July 2022	New York Stadium, Rotherham, England	Italy	5–0	5–1	UEFA Women's Euro 2022
12	2 September 2022	Lilleküla Stadium, Tallinn, Estonia	Estonia	9–0	9–0	2023 FIFA Women's World Cup qualification
13	6 September 2022	Stade Louis Dugauguez, Sedan, France	Greece	1–0	5–1	2023 FIFA Women's World Cup qualification
14	7 April 2023	Stade Gabriel Montpied, Clermont-Ferrand, France	Colombia	5–2	5–2	Friendly
15	11 April 2023	MMArena, Le Mans, France	Canada	1–0	2–1	Friendly
16	22 September 2023	Stade du Hainaut, Valenciennes, France	Portugal	1–0	2–0	2023–24 UEFA Women's Nations League
17	5 December 2023	Estádio Dr. Magalhães Pessoa, Leiria, Portugal	Portugal	1–0	1–0	2023–24 UEFA Women's Nations League
18	30 May 2025	Stade Marcel Picot, Tomblaine, France	Switzerland	4–0	4–0	2025 UEFA Women's Nations League
19	3 June 2025	Laugardalsvöllur, Reykjavík, Iceland	Iceland	2–0	2–0	2025 UEFA Women's Nations League
20	27 June 2025	Stade des Alpes, Grenoble, France	Brazil	1–2	3–2	Friendly
21	27 June 2025	Stade des Alpes, Grenoble, France	Brazil	2–2	3–2	Friendly
22	9 July 2025	Kybunpark, St. Gallen, Switzerland	Wales	4–1	4–1	UEFA Women's Euro 2025
23	19 July 2025	St. Jakob-Park, Basel, Switzerland	Germany	1–0	1–1 (a.e.t.) (5–6 p)	UEFA Women's Euro 2025
24	10 October 2026	Stade Francis Le Basser, Laval, France	Latvia	4–0	9–0	Friendly

== Honours ==
Paris Saint-Germain

- Première Ligue: 2020–21
- Coupe de France Féminine: 2017–18, 2021–22, 2023–24
- UEFA Women's Champions League runner-up: 2014–15, 2016–17

France U17

- FIFA U-17 Women's World Cup: 2012

France U19

- UEFA Women's Under-19 Championship: 2016

France U20

- FIFA U-20 Women's World Cup runner-up: 2016

France

- UEFA Women's Nations League runner-up: 2023–24

Individual

- UEFA Women's Under-19 Championship team of the tournament: 2016
- LFFP Première Ligue best young player: 2016–17
- UNFP Première Ligue team of the year: 2020–21, 2021–22, 2022–23, 2023–24, 2024–25
- LFFP Première Ligue team of the season: 2016–17, 2020–21, 2021–22, 2022–23, 2023–24
- LFFP Première Ligue goal of the season: 2020–21
- Première Ligue Player of the Month: April 2023
