= Aurélie Gagnet =

French footballer (born 1994)

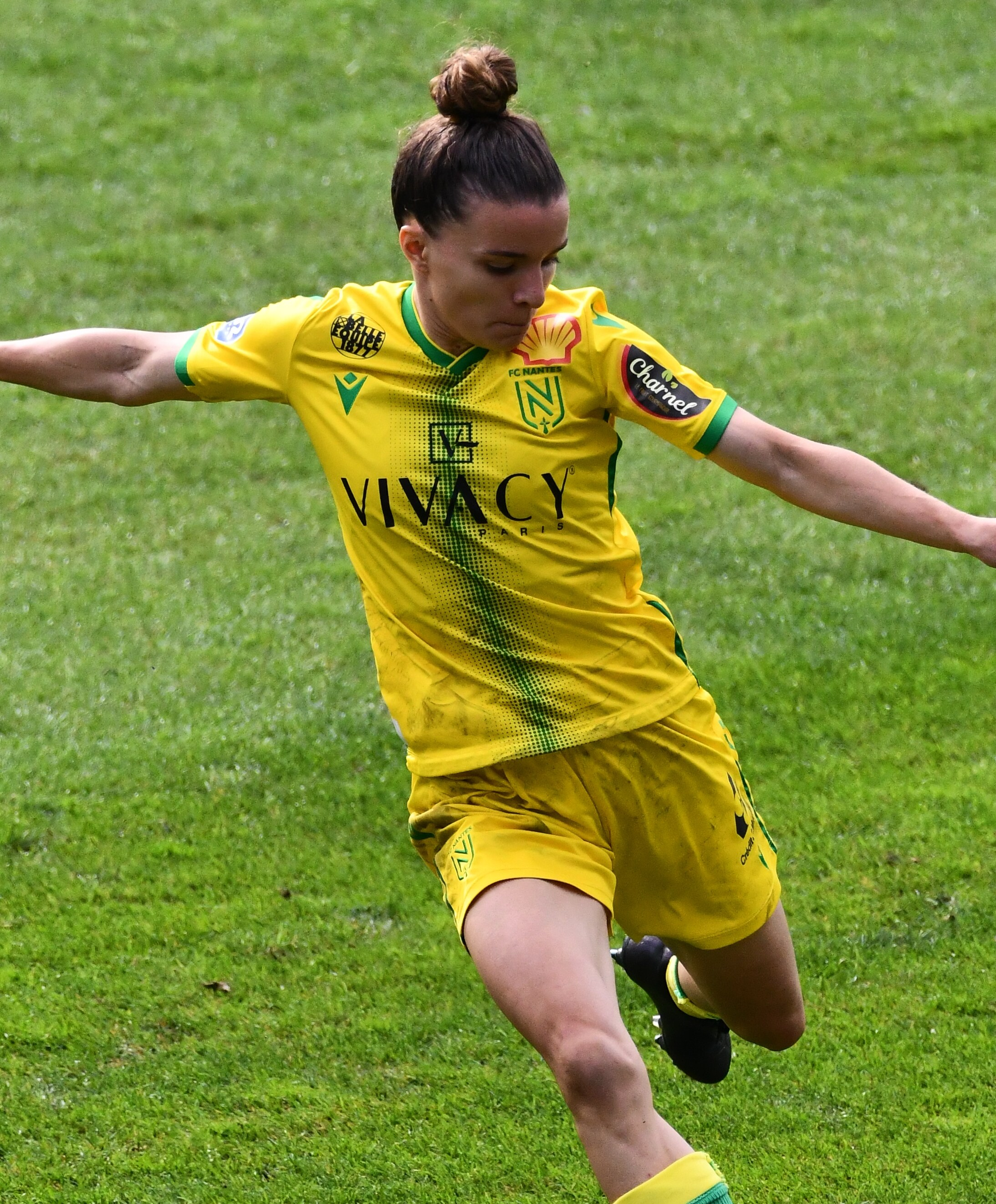
- Gagnet playing for Nantes in 2021

Personal information
- Date of birth: 30 December 1994 (age 31)
- Place of birth: Dreux, Eure-et-Loir, France
- Height: 1.60 m (5 ft 3 in)
- Position: Full back

Youth career
- 2001–2008: CS Ivry-la-Bataille
- 2008–2013: Montpellier

College career
| Years | Team | Apps | (Gls) |
| 2013–2016 | Kansas Jayhawks | 70 | (0) |

Senior career*
| Years | Team | Apps | (Gls) |
| 2010–2013 | Montpellier | 6 | (0) |
| 2018–2020 | Le Havre | 38 | (1) |
| 2020–2022 | Nantes | 23 | (0) |

International career^{‡}
| 2010 | France U16 | 2 | (0) |
| 2009 | France U17 | 1 | (0) |
| 2012–2013 | France U19 | 13 | (1) |
| 2014 | France U20 | 5 | (0) |
Medal record
Women's football
Representing France
FIFA U-20 Women's World Cup
| Third place | 2014 Canada |
UEFA Women's Under-19 Championship
| Winner | 2013 Wales |
- * Club domestic league appearances and goals as of 27 March 2025 ‡ National team caps and goals as of 20 June 2025

Aurélie Gagnet (born 30 December 1994) is a fronte French professional footballer who played as a full back.

== Club career ==
Gagnet began her career playing for Montpellier before moving to the United States in 2013 to join the Kansas Jayhawks, the women’s soccer team of the University of Kansas, where she studied political science. During her college career (2013–2016), she made 70 appearances, including 57 as a starter, and was named to the Big 12 All-Newcomer Team in 2013. She also earned multiple academic honors during her time with the team.

In 2018, she returned to France and signed her first professional contract with Le Havre. In 2020, she joined FC Nantes.

== International career ==
Gagnet has represented France U19, winning the UEFA Women's Under-19 Championship in 2013. She scored her first international goal in the qualifiers and helped the team capture the continental title. In 2014, she was part of France's U‑20 squad at the 2014 FIFA U-20 Women's World Cup, playing three matches and contributing to their third-place finish.
