= Laëtitia Philippe =

French footballer (born 1991)

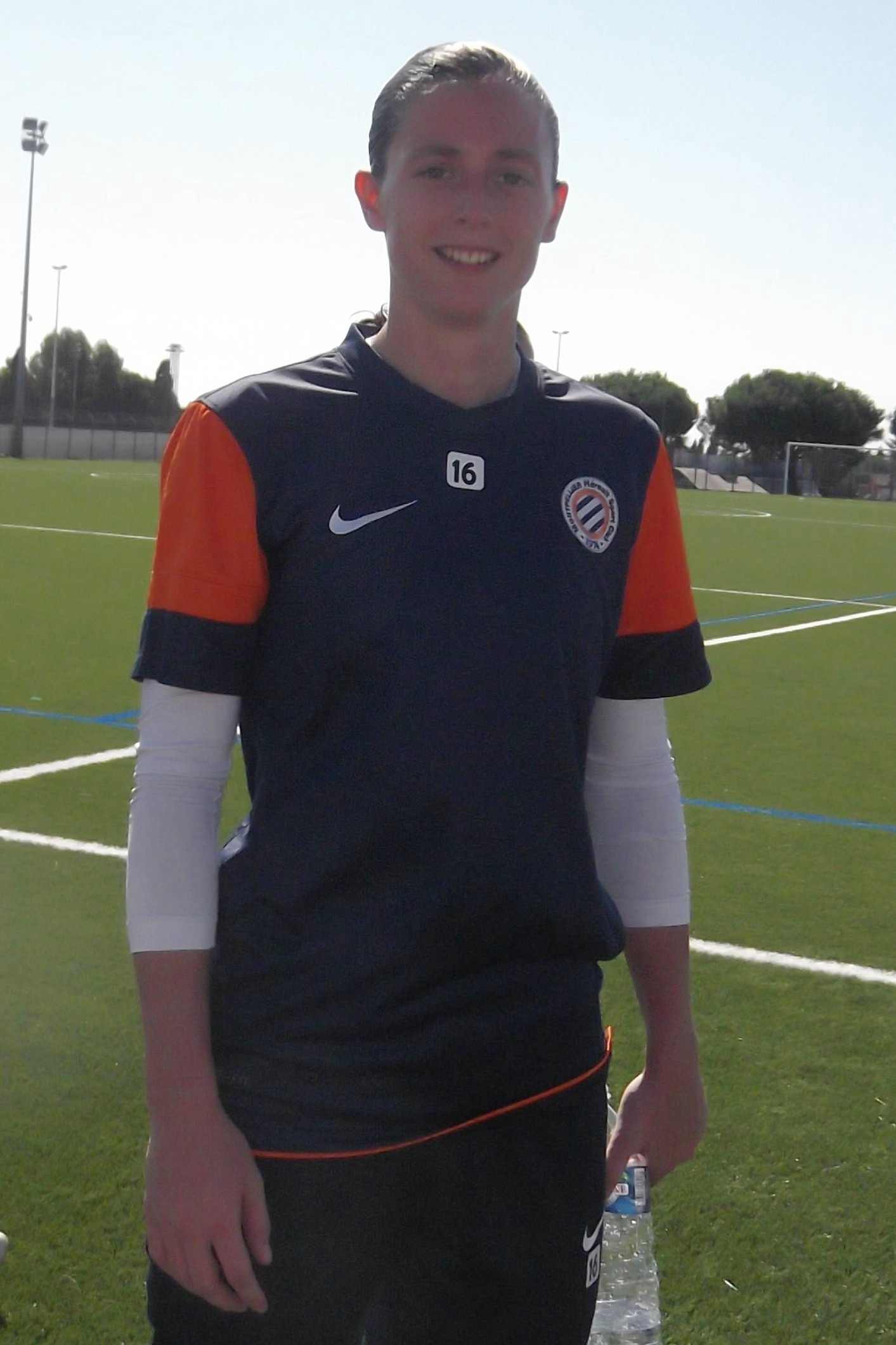
- Philippe in 2013

Personal information
- Full name: Laëtitia Marie Philippe
- Date of birth: 30 April 1991 (age 35)
- Place of birth: Chambéry, France
- Height: 5 ft 8 in (1.73 m)
- Position: Goalkeeper

Team information
- Current team: Le Havre
- Number: 16

Youth career
- 1998–2002: FC Vimines
- 2002–2004: Cognin Sports Foot
- 2004–2006: Sportif Rumilly
- 2006–2007: CNFE Clairefontaine
- 2007: Montpellier

Senior career*
Years	Team	Apps	(Gls)
2007–2018	Montpellier	119	(0)
2018–2019	Rodez	12	(0)
2019–2021	FC Fleury 91	16	(0)
2021	GPSO 92 Issy	9	(0)
2021–2022	Soyaux	3	(0)
2022	→ Bordeaux (loan)	4	(0)
2022–	Le Havre	31	(0)

International career^{‡}
2006–2008	France U17	23	(0)
2009–2010	France U19	13	(0)
2009–2017	France	4	(0)
- * Club domestic league appearances and goals as of 20:21, 31 January 2021 (UTC) ‡ National team caps and goals as of 01:18, 01 March 2017 (UTC)

Laëtitia Marie Philippe (born 30 April 1991) is a French professional footballer who plays as a goalkeeper for Division 1 Féminine club Le Havre. From 2009 to 2017, she played for the France national team, making four appearances.

== Honours ==
France

- SheBelieves Cup: 2017
