= Sakina Karchaoui =

French footballer (born 1996)

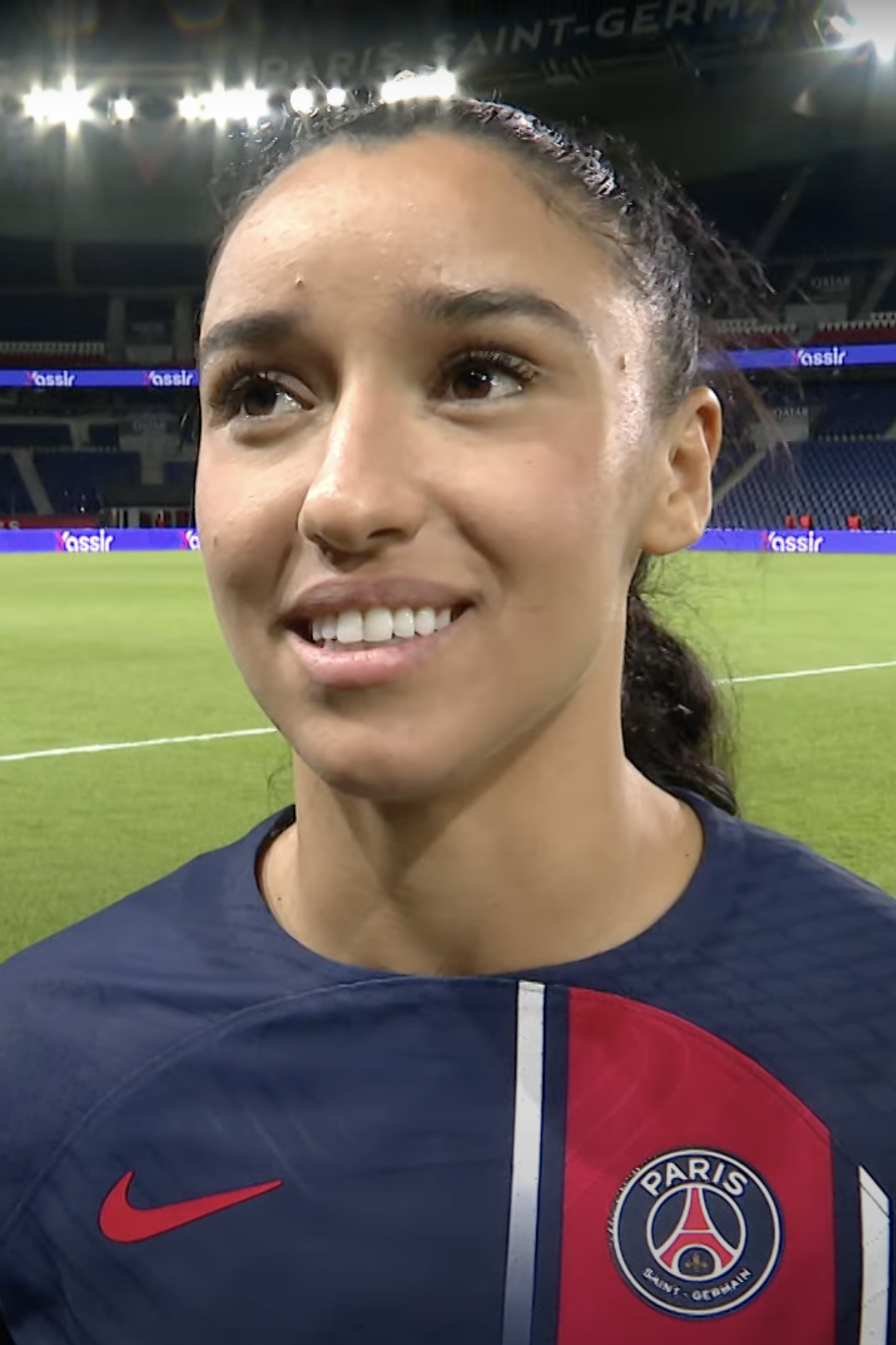
- Karchaoui with Paris Saint-Germain in 2023

Personal information
- Full name: Sakina Karchaoui
- Date of birth: 26 January 1996 (age 30)
- Place of birth: Salon-de-Provence, France
- Height: 1.60 m (5 ft 3 in)
- Positions: Left-back; midfielder

Team information
- Current team: Paris Saint-Germain
- Number: 7

Youth career
- 2007–2009: US Miramas
- 2009–2013: Montpellier

Senior career*
| Years | Team | Apps | (Gls) |
| 2012–2020 | Montpellier | 116 | (6) |
| 2020–2021 | Lyon | 18 | (0) |
| 2021– | Paris Saint-Germain | 89 | (16) |

International career^{‡}
| 2012 | France U17 | 6 | (1) |
| 2013–2015 | France U19 | 13 | (1) |
| 2016 | France U20 | 7 | (1) |
| 2016– | France | 103 | (6) |
Medal record
Women's football
Representing France
UEFA Women's Nations League
| Runner-up | 2024 |
| Third place | 2025 |
FIFA U-20 Women's World Cup
| Runner-up | 2016 Papua New Guinea |
- * Club domestic league appearances and goals as of 17 October 2026 ‡ National team caps and goals as of 10 October 2026

Sakina Karchaoui (Arabic: سكينة قرشاوي, pronounced [sa.ki.na kaʁ.ʃa.wi]; born 26 January 1996) is a French professional footballer who plays as a left-back or midfielder for Première Ligue club Paris Saint-Germain, which she captains, and the France national team.

== Early life ==
Born in Salon-de-Provence, in the Provence region of France, Karchaoui was raised in the nearby town of Miramas by her Moroccan parents. She began playing football in her neighborhood with boys. After two years at local club, US Miramas, she joined Montpellier.

== Club career ==
=== Montpellier ===
Karchaoui made her professional debut for Montpellier on 18 November 2012 in a 6–0 league win over Vendenheim. During the 2013–14 Division 1 Féminine season, she made six appearances for the club, tallying a total of 475 minutes on the pitch. Montpellier finished in fourth place with a 15–6–1 record. The following season, she made 12 appearances with 9 starts. The club finished the 2014–15 season in fourth place with a 13–4–5 record.

During the 2015–16 season, Karchaoui started in 19 of the 20 matches in which she appeared. On 1 November 2015, she scored her first goal in a 4–0 win against Rodez. Montpellier finished in third place during the regular season with a 15–3–5 record.

=== Lyon ===
On 24 June 2020, fourteen-time defending league champions Lyon announced the signing of Karchaoui for the 2020–21 season.

=== Paris Saint-Germain ===
On 10 July 2021, Karchaoui joined reigning league champions Paris Saint-Germain on a three-year deal. On 2 May 2024, she extended her contract with the club until June 2028. In September 2025, she was named as the club captain.

== International career ==
Karchaoui earned her first cap with the France national team in April 2016. She was later selected for the 2016 Rio Olympics. At the tournament, she started in the team's group-stage match against New Zealand resulting in a 3–0 win, and the quarter-final match against Canada where the team was eliminated in a 1–0 loss.

In March 2017, she helped France defeat the United States 3–0 to win the 2017 SheBelieves Cup for the first time.

Karchaoui was called up to the France squad for the UEFA Women's Euro 2017.

Karchaoui was called up to the France squad for the 2019 FIFA Women's World Cup.

On 30 May 2022, Karchaoui was called up to the France squad for the UEFA Women's Euro 2022.

Karchaoui was called up to the France squad for the 2023 FIFA Women's World Cup.

On 23 February 2024, she scored her first international goal in a 2–1 win against Germany.

In July 2024, Karchaoui was named in France's squad for the 2024 Olympics.

== Personal life ==
Karchaoui admired Robin van Persie, Hatem Ben Arfa and Samir Nasri when she was young.

== Career statistics ==
=== Club ===
As of match played 29 October 2026

Appearances and goals by club, season and competition
| Club | Season | League | | | National cup | | League cup | | Continental | | Other | | Total | |
| Club | Season | Division | Apps | Goals | Apps | Goals | Apps | Goals | Apps | Goals | Apps | Goals | Apps | Goals |
|---|---|---|---|---|---|---|---|---|---|---|---|---|---|---|
| Montpellier | 2012–13 | Première Ligue | 1 | 0 | 0 | 0 | — | | — | | — | | 1 | 0 |
| Montpellier | 2013–14 | Première Ligue | 6 | 0 | 0 | 0 | — | | — | | — | | 6 | 0 |
| Montpellier | 2014–15 | Première Ligue | 12 | 0 | 6 | 0 | — | | — | | — | | 18 | 0 |
| Montpellier | 2015–16 | Première Ligue | 20 | 1 | 6 | 1 | — | | — | | — | | 26 | 2 |
| Montpellier | 2016–17 | Première Ligue | 17 | 0 | 2 | 0 | — | | — | | — | | 19 | 0 |
| Montpellier | 2017–18 | Première Ligue | 22 | 0 | 4 | 0 | — | | 6 (Note: Appearance(s) in UEFA Women's Champions League) | 0 | — | | 32 | 0 |
| Montpellier | 2018–19 | Première Ligue | 22 | 2 | 1 | 0 | — | | — | | — | | 23 | 2 |
| Montpellier | 2019–20 | Première Ligue | 16 | 3 | 3 | 1 | — | | — | | — | | 19 | 4 |
| Montpellier | Total | | 116 | 6 | 22 | 2 | 0 | 0 | 6 | 0 | 0 | 0 | 144 | 8 |
| Lyon | 2019–20 | Première Ligue | — | | 0 | 0 | — | | 3 | 0 | — | | 3 | 0 |
| Lyon | 2020–21 | Première Ligue | 18 | 0 | 1 | 0 | — | | 5 | 0 | — | | 24 | 0 |
| Lyon | Total | | 18 | 0 | 1 | 0 | 0 | 0 | 8 | 0 | 0 | 0 | 27 | 0 |
| Paris Saint-Germain | 2021–22 | Première Ligue | 19 | 2 | 5 | 1 | — | | 9 | 1 | — | | 33 | 4 |
| Paris Saint-Germain | 2022–23 | Première Ligue | 17 | 1 | 3 | 0 | — | | 10 | 0 | 1 (Note: Appearance in Trophée des Championnes) | 0 | 31 | 1 |
| Paris Saint-Germain | 2023–24 | Première Ligue | 15 | 2 | 3 | 0 | — | | 12 | 0 | 3 (Note: Two appearances in playoffs, one appearance in Trophée des Championnes) | 0 | 33 | 2 |
| Paris Saint-Germain | 2024–25 | Première Ligue | 15 | 4 | 5 | 0 | — | | 1 | 0 | 2 (Note: Appearance(s) in playoffs) | 1 | 23 | 5 |
| Paris Saint-Germain | 2025–26 | Première Ligue | 19 | 6 | 4 | 0 | 3 | 0 | 5 | 1 | 1 | 0 | 32 | 7 |
| Paris Saint-Germain | 2026–27 | Première Ligue | 4 | 1 | 0 | 0 | 0 | 0 | 5 | 4 | — | | 9 | 5 |
| Paris Saint-Germain | Total | | 89 | 16 | 20 | 1 | 3 | 0 | 42 | 6 | 7 | 1 | 161 | 24 |
| Career total | | | 223 | 22 | 43 | 3 | 3 | 0 | 56 | 6 | 7 | 1 | 332 | 32 |

=== International ===
As of match played 10 October 2026

Appearances and goals by national team and year
| National team | Year | Apps | Goals |
|---|---|---|---|
| France | 2016 | 7 | 0 |
| France | 2017 | 10 | 0 |
| France | 2018 | 4 | 0 |
| France | 2019 | 9 | 0 |
| France | 2020 | 8 | 0 |
| France | 2021 | 5 | 0 |
| France | 2022 | 11 | 0 |
| France | 2023 | 14 | 0 |
| France | 2024 | 13 | 2 |
| France | 2025 | 15 | 3 |
| France | 2026 | 7 | 1 |
| Total | | 103 | 6 |

Scores and results list France's goal tally first, score column indicates score after each Karchaoui goal.

List of international goals scored by Sakina Karchaoui
| No. | Date | Venue | Opponent | Score | Result | Competition |
|---|---|---|---|---|---|---|
| 1 | 23 February 2024 | Parc Olympique Lyonnais, Décines-Charpieu, France | Germany | 2–0 | 2–1 | 2024 UEFA Women's Nations League Finals |
| 2 | 12 July 2024 | Stade Gaston Gérard, Dijon, France | Sweden | 1–0 | 2–1 | 2025 UEFA Women's Euro qualification |
| 3 | 20 June 2025 | Stade du Hainaut, Valenciennes, France | Belgium | 3–0 | 5–0 | Friendly |
| 4 | 13 July 2025 | St. Jakob-Park, Basel, Switzerland | Netherlands | 5–2 | 5–2 | UEFA Women's Euro 2025 |
| 5 | 28 November 2025 | Stade Auguste-Delaune, Reims, France | Sweden | 1–0 | 2–1 | 2025 UEFA Women's Nations League Finals |
| 6 | 7 March 2026 | Stade Gaston Gérard, Dijon, France | Poland | 3–1 | 4–1 | 2027 FIFA World Cup qualification |

== Honours ==
Montpellier

- Coupe de France Féminine runner-up: 2014–15, 2015–16

Lyon

- UEFA Women's Champions League: 2019–20

Paris Saint-Germain

- Coupe de France Féminine: 2021–22, 2023–24

France U20

- FIFA U-20 Women's World Cup runner-up: 2016

France

- UEFA Women's Nations League runner-up: 2023–24

Individual

- IFFHS World Team: 2020
- UEFA Women's Championship team of the tournament: 2022
- UNFP Première Ligue young player of the year: 2016–17
- UNFP Première Ligue team of the year: 2020–21, 2021–22, 2022–23, 2023–24, 2025–26
- LFFP Première Ligue team of the season: 2016–17, 2017–18, 2020–21, 2021–22, 2022–23, 2023–24, 2024–25, 2025–26
- Première Ligue Player of the Month: December 2021, February 2025, March 2026
