= Sonia Ouchene =

French footballer (born 2000)

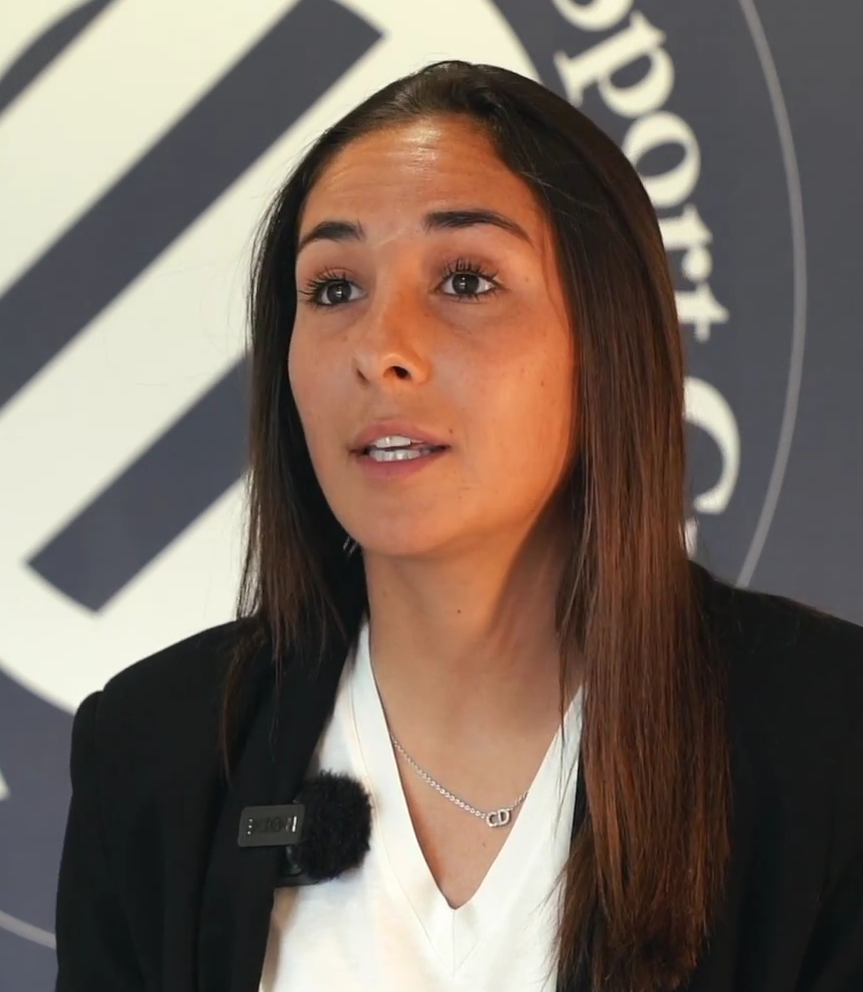
- Ouchene in 2023

Personal information
- Full name: Sonia Ouchene Salón
- Date of birth: 14 March 2000 (age 26)
- Place of birth: Valencia, Spain
- Height: 1.58 m (5 ft 2 in)
- Position: Midfielder

Team information
- Current team: Les Marseillaises
- Number: 99

College career
Years	Team	Apps	(Gls)
2019	Tennessee Volunteers	17	(2)

Senior career*
Years	Team	Apps	(Gls)
2015–2018	Reims	58	(8)
2018–2019	Valencia B	25	(13)
2020–2023	Reims	63	(8)
2023–2026	Montpellier	62	(8)
2026–	Les Marseillaises	0	(0)

International career^{‡}
2017	France U17	2	(0)
2018–2019	France U19	12	(5)
2020	France U20	2	(0)
2021–2025	France U23	17	(2)
- * Club domestic league appearances and goals as of 21:16, 29 June 2026 (UTC) ‡ National team caps and goals as of 23:00, 22 April 2026 (UTC)

Sonia Ouchene Salón (born 14 March 2000) is a professional footballer who plays as a midfielder for Première Ligue club Les Marseillaises. Born in Spain, she has represented France at the youth national level. Ouchene has previously played domestically for Reims and Montpellier, and in Spain for Valencia B.

== Early life ==
Ouchene was born in Valencia, Spain, to a Spanish mother and a French father. She grew up in the nearby town of Paterna alongside her parents and two siblings. Ouchene began playing football at the age of 7 before moving to Paris at 15 to enroll in the INSEP academy. While plying her trade at INSEP, Ouchene also spent a three-year stint with Division 2 Féminine side Reims. In 2018, she returned to Spain to play one campaign for Valencia CF's reserve team. Ouchene scored 13 goals in 25 matches to help Valencia claim a regional title in the Spanish second division.

== College career ==
In 2019, Ouchene moved overseas and played one season of American college soccer with the Tennessee Volunteers. She made her collegiate debut on 22 August 2019, playing 52 minutes in a match against Fordham. She recorded her first goal for the Volunteers in a 3–1 victory over Cincinnati on September 8. The following match, Ouchene scored directly from a free kick to open the scoring in a draw with Massachusetts. She went on to accumulate a total of 17 appearances for the Volunteers, starting in all but 2. Despite having previously planned on staying in Tennessee for four years, Ouchene chose to head back home to Europe after only five months in the United States. She cited a lack of enjoyment with the direct and physical style of play in college as the main reason for her early exit.

== Club career ==
=== Reims ===
Ouchene re-joined her former club Reims in January 2020. Since Ouchene's departure from the club two years prior, Reims had managed to earn promotion to the French top-flight and had already completed half of its first season in the Division 1 Féminine. Ouchene made 4 appearances for the team before operations halted in March 2020 due to the COVID-19 pandemic. She spent the remainder of quarantine in Valencia with her family members.

In her first full season with Reims, Ouchene registered 22 appearances and a career-high 19 starts. She also scored four goals, three of which came in an October 2020 hat-trick over Issy. On 25 February 2021, she inked a new deal with the club to keep her with the club an additional two years. Once Ouchene's contract expired in June 2023, she departed from the club. Counting both of her three-year stints with Reims, she had spent six seasons with the club and participated in 132 total games.

=== Montpellier ===
On 6 July 2023, Ouchene joined Montpellier. She recorded her first goal for Montpellier on 18 November 2023, scoring against her former club Reims; fellow ex-Reims player Kethna Louis also scored as the two Montpellier newcomers combined to achieve a 2–1 victory for their new club. Ouchene soon rose to prominence in the Montpellier squad, narrowly winning the team's January 2025 Player of the Month award over Océane Deslandes.

In July 2025, Ouchene was temporarily named Montpellier club captain after longtime skipper Marion Torrent went on maternity leave. Three months later, Ouchene was named the October 2025 Première Ligue Player of the Month award after recording a goal and two assists to help lift her team to victories against Strasbourg and Lens. On April 22, 2026, she sustained a serious cruciate ligament injury that ended her third season at Montpellier early.

=== Les Marseillaises ===
In June 2026, Ouchene moved to Les Marseillaises, signing a three-year contract until 2029. She is not expected to take the field until the end of 2026 as she rehabilitates from her knee injury.

== International career ==
Ouchene has represented France at multiple youth international levels, starting with a call-up to the under-16 team in 2015. Prior to joining the Tennessee Volunteers, she played for the French under-19 team across two years and scored 5 times across 12 matches. From 2020 to 2025, she has made 19 total appearances for the under-20 and under-23s.

== Honours ==
Individual

- Première Ligue Player of the Month: October 2025
