= Le Havre AC (women) =

Women's association football club in France

Le Havre
- Full name: Havre Athletic Club
- Nicknames: Les Havraises; Les Ciel et Marine (The Sky-and-Navy)
- Founded: 2015; 11 years ago
- Ground: Stade Océane
- Capacity: 25,181
- President: Vincent Volpe
- Head coach: Maxime Di Liberto
- League: Première Ligue
- 2025–26: Première Ligue, 8th of 12
- Website: http://www.hac-foot.com
Home colours	Away colours

Le Havre Athletic Club, commonly known simply as Le Havre (French pronunciation: [lə ɑvʁ]), is a French women's football club based in Le Havre, Normandy. Founded in 2015, the club plays its home matches at the Stade Océane in the city. It competes in the Première Ligue as of the 2026–27 season.

== History ==
At the instigation of the president of the association of Le Havre AC, Jean-Michel Kociszewski, and his management committee, HAC created its own female section in 2010. First, it trained young beginners for a few years, before in 2014 opening its doors to licensed players and registering U11 and U13 teams in formal competition. By 2015, the female section of HAC had 90 players, forming teams in all age categories from U8 to seniors.

On 27 September 2015, the senior women's team from Le Havre AC played its first match in official competition on the ground of Saint-Nicolas-d'Aliermont. On 5 May 2016, Le Havre won the Coupe de Normandie at the expense of ESM Gonfreville l'Orcher. Against the same opponent, the Le Havre team also won the DMF Cup (Maritime Football District).

At the beginning of the 2017–18 season, under the leadership of American club president Vincent Volpe, the women's team was reinforced by eight American college players. With these reinforcements, Le Havre achieved an almost perfect Regional 1 championship with 22 wins with one a draw (against AG Caen), with 146 goals scored and only seven conceded. In February 2018, Le Havre AC managed to qualify for the quarter-finals of the French Women's Cup. At the end of the season, the HAC played two rounds of play-offs, during which they defeated Amien SC (women) (1–0, 4–0) then Nice (2–2, 1–0) to secure promotion into Division 2 for the first time.

For the 2018–19 D2 season, due to a limit of three non-EU players in the match day squad, the American contingent was reduced to five, with only three being able to play any one game. Le Havre then turned to the British market, signing Martha Thomas (British-American), Courtney Brosnan (Irish-American), Lois Heuchan (Scottish), Ellie Leek and Rhian Cleverly (both Welsh). Added to these were French players Aurélie Gagnet, Margaux Huaumé, Élodie Policarpo, Ikram Adjabi and Léa Kergal. Due in part to several injuries sustained during preparations, Le Havre began its championship in indifferent form with two wins, three draws and three defeats after eight days. An upturn saw four consecutive wins before the Christmas break. After 15 match days, the club was fourth in the table with eight wins, three draws and four defeats, already trailing table-toppers Reims by 14 points. Nevertheless, "Les Havraises" ended the season in an encouraging second place.

The 2019–20 season was suspended on 12 March 2020, by the French Football Federation, due to the COVID-19 pandemic in France. The competition was then cancelled on 16 April 2020, with the final classification made according to average points-per-match played. As a result Le Havre finished at the top of its group and was promoted to Division 1 at the expense of the Stéphanoises, who led until the last match day but saw their final game postponed. This final classification was ratified on 15 May 2020.

At the outset of its first season in D1, the women's and girls' section of Le Havre comprised 150 licensed players of all ages. While coach Thierry Uvenard's contract was extended until 2022, the club kept only twelve players from the squad which gained promotion to the top flight of French football, including the majority of its American players. The team was bolstered by several French players who signed for two years: Lina Boussaha, from PSG, Élise Legrout who was at college in the United States, right-back Santana Sarhaoui (US Orléans) and goalkeeper Olesya Arsenieva. Several foreign internationals also signed: Cameroonian Luce Ndolo Ewelé, Chilean Francisca Lara, Russian Ekaterina Tyryshkina and Icelandic Berglind Björg Þorvaldsdóttir. Despite the squad being decimated by enforced absences, HAC began its D1 season perfectly with a 4–0 victory against the other promoted team GPSO 92 Issy. After a defeat by Fleury, HAC's absent players returned and helped secure a point against Paris FC. Le Havre also rounded out a busy transfer window by signing its ninth and 10th recruits: Turkey's Melike Pekel and the Icelandic Anna Björk Kristjánsdóttir.

In September 2020, Laure Lepailleur was appointed manager of the HAC women's and girls' section. Her mission was to continue the development and structuring of women's football within the Le Havre club. A disappointing 2020–21 Division 1 Féminine campaign saw Le Havre win only two matches and finish at the foot of the 12-team table, resulting in their relegation back to D2 after a single season at France's top level.

== Training ground ==
Initially the HAC women's team trained at Stade de la Cavée Verte. During the renovation of the Cavée Verte surface in 2016, they trained in Sanvic, on the grounds of the GASEG players, an agreement having been signed between the HAC and the company clubs.

Later the club wanted to separate boys and girls, declaring the Cavée Verte was too busy to support both. Therefore, the female players began training once a week at the nearby Yuri-Gagarin stadium, on hybrid terrain. In 2020 they were moved there permanently, with improvements including changing rooms and a weight room constructed.

== Current squad ==
As of 9 November 2026

Note: Flags indicate national team as defined under FIFA eligibility rules; some limited exceptions apply. Players may hold more than one non-FIFA nationality.

No.	Pos.	Nation	Player
3	DF	COL	Ángela Barón
5	DF	UGA	Shadia Nankya
6	MF	FRA	Solène Champagnac
7	FW	FRA	Zoé Stievenart
9	FW	ALG	Ikram Adjabi
10	MF	FRA	Judith Coquet
11	MF	FRA	Mélinda Mendy
12	DF	FRA	Mael Doré
14	DF	TTO	Kédie Johnson
15	DF	FRA	Maïté Boucly
16	GK	FRA	Marie Petiteau

No.	Pos.	Nation	Player
17	MF	MAR	Sarah Kassi
18	FW	FRA	Thaïs Gallais
19	FW	FRA	Esther Mbakem-Niaro
22	DF	FRA	Talila Seika
25	DF	FRA	Eden Le Guilly
20	DF	FRA	Luna Laboucarie
23	MF	MAR	Jade Nassi
27	MF	FRA	Emmy Lefèvre
28	DF	FRA	Célestine Boisard
95	FW	FRA	Naolia Traoré
