= FC Girondins de Bordeaux (women) =

Bordeaux
- Full name: Football Club des Girondins de Bordeaux
- Founded: 2015, as part of FC Girondins de Bordeaux
- Ground: Stade Sainte-Germaine, Le Bouscat, Bordeaux
- Capacity: 7,000
- Chairman: Stéphane Martin
- Manager: Patrice Lair
- League: Seconde Ligue
- 2023–24: Division 1 Féminine, 11th of 12 (relegated)
- Website: http://www.girondins.com/
Home colours	Away colours

Football Club des Girondins de Bordeaux (French pronunciation: [ʒiʁɔ̃dɛ̃ də bɔʁdo]; commonly referred to as Girondins de Bordeaux or simply Bordeaux) is a French women's football club based in the city of Bordeaux. It has been the women's section of FC Girondins de Bordeaux since 2015. The club previously played in the Seconde Ligue, the second-highest division of women's football in France. After their parent club folded, the club was excluded from the Second Ligue. The club has not played any matches in the 2024–25 season.

== European record ==
UEFA Women's Champions League
Season	Round 1	Round 2	Group stage	Quarterfinals	Semifinals	Final
2021–22	(Czech Republic) Slovácko	(Sweden) Kristianstads	(Germany) Wolfsburg	-		
2021–22	2–1	3–1	5–5 (3–0 p)	-		

== Players ==
=== Current squad ===
As of 22 December 2024

Note: Flags indicate national team as defined under FIFA eligibility rules; some limited exceptions apply. Players may hold more than one non-FIFA nationality.

No.	Pos.	Nation	Player
—	GK	(France) FRA	Lene Lambret
—	MF	(France) FRA	Axelle Graveleau
5	DF	(France) FRA	Andréa Lardez (Captain)
—	DF	(France) FRA	Amandine Herbert
—	DF	(France) FRA	Élisa Gonthier
—	DF	(France) FRA	Alizée Ribeiro
—	DF	(France) FRA	Chiara Baylet
—	MF	(France) FRA	Julia Roux
—	FW	(France) FRA	Ilona Koko
—	MF	(France) FRA	Noëllie Koutassila
—	MF	(Algeria) ALG	Sarah Guellil
—	DF	(France) FRA	Mathilde Meunier
—		(France) FRA	Linda Bouhendjeur

No.	Pos.	Nation	Player
—	FW	(French Polynesia) TAH	Kiani Wong
—	MF	(France) FRA	Éva Drouet
—	FW	(France) FRA	Kaysseely Danguiat Avrila
—	GK	(France) FRA	Orphée Roubine
—		(France) FRA	Imane E.
—		(France) FRA	Elia D.
12	FW	(France) FRA	Laurine Bruyère
—		(France) FRA	Stella G.
—	GK	(France) FRA	Valentine Marcandella
—		(France) FRA	Louane Zamarreno
—		(France) FRA	Gwladys Dumont
—		(France) FRA	Naig Melotte
—	DF	(France) FRA	Manon Brenot
