= 2022 CONCACAF W Championship squads =

Each team must submit a final squad of 23 players for 2022 CONCACAF W Championship, three of whom must be goalkeepers, at least ten days before the opening match of the tournament. If a player becomes injured or ill severely enough to prevent their participation in the tournament before their team's first match, or following the completion of the group stage, they can be replaced by another player from the preliminary list. On 8 June, all the teams submitted their preliminary roster. The final rosters were announced on 29 June 2022.

The age listed for each player is their age as of 4 July 2022, the first day of the tournament. The numbers of caps and goals listed for each player do not include any matches played after the start of the tournament. The club listed is the club for which the player last played a competitive match prior to the tournament. The nationality for each club reflects the national association (not the league) to which the club is affiliated. A flag is included for coaches who are of a different nationality to their team.

== Group A ==
=== Haiti ===
A 26-player training camp roster was announced on 17 June 2022. The final 23-player roster was released on 29 June 2022.

Head coach: (France) Nicolas Delépine

No.	Pos.	Player	Date of birth (age)	Caps	Goals	Club
1	GK	Madelina Fleuriot	28 October 2003 (aged 18)	1	0	(Haitian Football Federation) Exafoot
2	DF	Chelsea Surpris	20 December 1996 (aged 25)	4	1	(French Football Federation) Yzeure
3	DF	Jennyfer Limage	25 December 1997 (aged 24)	1	0	(French Football Federation) Grenoble
4	MF	Tabita Joseph	13 September 2003 (aged 18)	1+	0	(French Football Federation) Brest
5	DF	Maudeline Moryl	24 January 2003 (aged 19)	2	0	(Haitian Football Federation) Exafoot
6	MF	Melchie Dumornay	17 August 2003 (aged 18)	5	2	(French Football Federation) Reims
7	FW	Batcheba Louis	15 June 1997 (aged 25)	13	23	(French Football Federation) Issy
8	FW	Meghane St-Cyr	26 February 2003 (aged 19)	1	0	(Canadian Soccer Association) Collège Ahuntsic
9	FW	Sherly Jeudy	13 October 1998 (aged 23)	11	9	(French Football Federation) Grenoble
10	FW	Nérilia Mondésir (captain)	17 January 1999 (aged 23)	10	18	(French Football Federation) Montpellier
11	FW	Roseline Éloissaint	20 February 1999 (aged 23)	8	5	(French Football Federation) Nantes
12	GK	Nahomie Ambroise	13 November 2003 (aged 18)	0	0	(Haitian Football Federation) Anacaona
13	MF	Betina Petit-Frère	1 August 2003 (aged 18)			(French Football Federation) Brest
14	DF	Claire Constant	13 October 1999 (aged 22)	0	0	(United States Soccer Federation) Virginia Cavaliers
15	FW	Florsie Joseph	15 December 2003 (aged 18)	0	0	(Haitian Football Federation) Don Bosco
16	MF	Milan Pierre-Jérôme	23 April 2002 (aged 20)	5	2	(United States Soccer Federation) Maryland Terrapins
17	FW	Mikerline Saint-Félix	18 November 1999 (aged 22)	5+	5	(French Football Federation) Montauban
18	DF	Estericove Joseph	5 February 2003 (aged 19)	0	0	(Haitian Football Federation) Exafoot
19	FW	Dayana Pierre-Louis	24 September 2003 (aged 18)	0	0	(Haitian Football Federation) Asf Croix des Bouquets
20	MF	Kethna Louis	5 August 1996 (aged 25)	5	2	(French Football Federation) Reims
21	DF	Ruthny Mathurin	14 January 2001 (aged 21)	6	0	(United States Soccer Federation) Louisiana Ragin' Cajuns
22	FW	Roselord Borgella	1 April 1993 (aged 29)	13	7	(French Football Federation) Issy
23	GK	Lara Larco	27 November 2002 (aged 19)	3	0	(United States Soccer Federation) Georgetown Hoyas

=== Jamaica ===
A provisional 26 player squad was announced on 14 June 2022. The final 24-player roster was released on 28 June 2022.

Head coach: Lorne Donaldson

No.	Pos.	Player	Date of birth (age)	Caps	Goals	Club
1	GK	Sydney Schneider	31 August 1999 (aged 22)	19	0	(United States Soccer Federation) Kansas City Current
2	DF	Satara Murray	1 July 1993 (aged 29)	1	0	(United States Soccer Federation) Racing Louisville
3	DF	Vyan Sampson	2 July 1996 (aged 26)	4	0	(The Football Association) Charlton Athletic
4	DF	Chantelle Swaby	6 August 1998 (aged 23)	23	0	(Scottish Football Association) Rangers
5	DF	Jade Bailey	11 November 1995 (aged 26)	1	0	(The Football Association) Liverpool
6	MF	Havana Solaun	23 February 1993 (aged 29)	9	2	(United States Soccer Federation) North Carolina Courage
7	MF	Chinyelu Asher	20 May 1993 (aged 29)	31	6	(Swedish Football Association) AIK
8	MF	Kayla McCoy	3 September 1996 (aged 25)	10	3	(Scottish Football Association) Rangers
9	MF	Drew Spence	23 October 1992 (aged 29)	1	0	(The Football Association) Tottenham Hotspur
10	FW	Jody Brown	16 April 2002 (aged 20)	18	12	(United States Soccer Federation) Florida State Seminoles
11	FW	Khadija Shaw (captain)	31 January 1997 (aged 25)	38	56	(The Football Association) Manchester City
12	DF	Jayda Hylton-Pelaia	30 March 1998 (aged 24)	4	0	(Canadian Soccer Association) Woodbridge Strikers
13	GK	Rebecca Spencer	22 February 1991 (aged 31)	4	0	(The Football Association) Tottenham Hotspur
14	MF	Deneisha Blackwood	7 March 1997 (aged 25)	26	7	Unattached
15	FW	Kalyssa Van Zanten	25 August 2001 (aged 20)	1	0	(United States Soccer Federation) Notre Dame Fighting Irish
16	MF	Paige Bailey-Gayle	12 November 2001 (aged 20)	1	0	Unattached
17	DF	Allyson Swaby	3 October 1996 (aged 25)	24	0	(United States Soccer Federation) Angel City
18	MF	Trudi Carter	18 November 1994 (aged 27)	23	15	(Lithuanian Football Federation) Gintra
19	MF	Tiernny Wiltshire	8 May 1998 (aged 24)	3	0	Unattached
20	MF	Atlanta Primus	21 April 1997 (aged 25)	1	0	(The Football Association) London City Lionesses
21	FW	Olufolasade Adamolekun	21 February 2001 (aged 21)	12	0	(United States Soccer Federation) USC Trojans
22	FW	Mireya Grey	7 September 1998 (aged 23)	9	1	Unattached
23	GK	Yazmeen Jamieson	17 March 1998 (aged 24)	5	0	(Canadian Soccer Association) Simcoe County Rovers

=== Mexico ===
The 33 players were called up for training-camp, that was held on 13 June 2022. The 23 player roster was announced on 23 June.

Head coach: Mónica Vergara

No.	Pos.	Player	Date of birth (age)	Caps	Goals	Club
1	GK	Emily Alvarado	9 June 1998 (aged 24)	15	0	(French Football Federation) Reims
2	DF	Kenti Robles (captain)	15 February 1991 (aged 31)	83	3	(Royal Spanish Football Federation) Real Madrid
3	DF	Greta Espinoza	5 June 1995 (aged 27)	27	0	(Mexican Football Federation) Tigres UANL
4	DF	Rebeca Bernal	31 August 1997 (aged 24)	38	3	(Mexican Football Federation) Monterrey
5	DF	Jimena López	30 January 1999 (aged 23)	31	3	(United States Soccer Federation) OL Reign
6	MF	Alexia Delgado	9 December 1999 (aged 22)	16	0	(United States Soccer Federation) Arizona State Sun Devils
7	FW	Myra Delgadillo	9 December 1995 (aged 26)	8	2	Unattached
8	MF	Carolina Jaramillo	19 March 1994 (aged 28)	8	4	(Mexican Football Federation) Guadalajara
9	FW	Katty Martínez	14 March 1998 (aged 24)	18	8	(Mexican Football Federation) América
10	MF	Stephany Mayor	23 September 1991 (aged 30)	95	23	(Mexican Football Federation) Tigres UANL
11	FW	María Sánchez	20 February 1996 (aged 26)	37	7	(United States Soccer Federation) Houston Dash
12	GK	Itzel González	14 August 1994 (aged 27)	8	0	(Mexican Football Federation) América
13	DF	Bianca Sierra	25 June 1992 (aged 30)	67	0	(Mexican Football Federation) Tigres UANL
14	MF	Casandra Montero	31 May 1994 (aged 28)	2	1	(Mexican Football Federation) Guadalajara
15	DF	Cristina Ferral	16 February 1993 (aged 29)	19	1	(Mexican Football Federation) Tigres UANL
16	MF	Nancy Antonio	2 April 1996 (aged 26)	26	1	(Mexican Football Federation) Tigres UANL
17	FW	Jacqueline Ovalle	19 October 1999 (aged 22)	25	6	(Mexican Football Federation) Tigres UANL
18	FW	Joseline Montoya	23 July 2000 (aged 21)	10	1	(Mexican Football Federation) Guadalajara
19	FW	Alicia Cervantes	24 January 1994 (aged 28)	13	6	(Mexican Football Federation) Guadalajara
20	MF	Diana García	11 November 1999 (aged 22)	11	2	(Mexican Football Federation) Monterrey
21	GK	Melany Villeda	25 October 2001 (aged 20)	1	0	(Mexican Football Federation) Pumas UNAM
22	FW	Diana Ordoñez	26 September 2001 (aged 20)	4	4	(United States Soccer Federation) North Carolina Courage
23	MF	Maricarmen Reyes	23 April 2000 (aged 22)	7	6	(United States Soccer Federation) UCLA Bruins

=== United States ===
The 23 player roster was named on 13 June 2022. On 11 July 2022, Ashley Hatch withdrew due to an injury sustained in the group match against Jamaica and was replaced by Sam Coffey.

Head coach: (North Macedonia) Vlatko Andonovski

No.	Pos.	Player	Date of birth (age)	Caps	Goals	Club
1	GK	Alyssa Naeher	20 April 1988 (aged 34)	81	0	(United States Soccer Federation) Chicago Red Stars
2	MF	Ashley Sanchez	16 March 1999 (aged 23)	9	2	(United States Soccer Federation) Washington Spirit
3	DF	Alana Cook	11 April 1997 (aged 25)	10	0	(United States Soccer Federation) OL Reign
4	DF	Becky Sauerbrunn (captain)	6 June 1985 (aged 37)	203	0	(United States Soccer Federation) Portland Thorns
5	DF	Kelley O'Hara	4 August 1988 (aged 33)	154	3	(United States Soccer Federation) Washington Spirit
6	FW	Trinity Rodman	20 May 2002 (aged 20)	4	1	(United States Soccer Federation) Washington Spirit
7	FW	Ashley Hatch	25 May 1995 (aged 27)	10	4	(United States Soccer Federation) Washington Spirit
8	DF	Sofia Huerta	14 December 1992 (aged 29)	14	0	(United States Soccer Federation) OL Reign
9	FW	Mallory Pugh	29 April 1998 (aged 24)	74	23	(United States Soccer Federation) Chicago Red Stars
10	MF	Lindsey Horan	26 May 1994 (aged 28)	111	25	(French Football Federation) Lyon
11	FW	Sophia Smith	10 August 2000 (aged 21)	16	6	(United States Soccer Federation) Portland Thorns
12	DF	Naomi Girma	14 June 2000 (aged 22)	2	0	(United States Soccer Federation) San Diego Wave
13	FW	Alex Morgan	2 July 1989 (aged 33)	192	115	(United States Soccer Federation) San Diego Wave
14	DF	Emily Sonnett	25 November 1993 (aged 28)	66	0	(United States Soccer Federation) Washington Spirit
15	FW	Megan Rapinoe	5 July 1985 (aged 36)	189	62	(United States Soccer Federation) OL Reign
16	MF	Rose Lavelle	14 May 1995 (aged 27)	73	20	(United States Soccer Federation) OL Reign
17	MF	Andi Sullivan	20 December 1995 (aged 26)	28	3	(United States Soccer Federation) Washington Spirit
18	GK	Casey Murphy	25 April 1996 (aged 26)	5	0	(United States Soccer Federation) North Carolina Courage
19	DF	Emily Fox	5 July 1998 (aged 23)	14	0	(United States Soccer Federation) Racing Louisville
20	MF	Taylor Kornieck	22 November 1998 (aged 23)	2	1	(United States Soccer Federation) San Diego Wave
21	GK	Aubrey Kingsbury	20 November 1991 (aged 30)	1	0	(United States Soccer Federation) Washington Spirit
22	MF	Kristie Mewis	25 February 1991 (aged 31)	40	5	(United States Soccer Federation) Gotham FC
23	FW	Margaret Purce	18 September 1995 (aged 26)	15	3	(United States Soccer Federation) Gotham FC
24	MF	Sam Coffey	31 December 1998 (aged 23)	0	0	(United States Soccer Federation) Portland Thorns

== Group B ==
=== Canada ===
The 23 player roster was named on 24 June 2022.

Head coach: (England) Bev Priestman

No.	Pos.	Player	Date of birth (age)	Caps	Goals	Club
1	GK	Kailen Sheridan	16 July 1995 (aged 26)	24	0	(United States Soccer Federation) San Diego Wave
2	DF	Allysha Chapman	25 January 1989 (aged 33)	89	1	(United States Soccer Federation) Houston Dash
3	DF	Kadeisha Buchanan	5 November 1995 (aged 26)	118	4	(The Football Association) Chelsea
4	DF	Shelina Zadorsky	24 October 1992 (aged 29)	82	3	(The Football Association) Tottenham Hotspur
5	MF	Quinn	11 August 1995 (aged 26)	78	5	(United States Soccer Federation) OL Reign
6	FW	Deanne Rose	3 March 1999 (aged 23)	68	12	(The Football Association) Reading
7	MF	Julia Grosso	29 August 2000 (aged 21)	37	0	(Italian Football Federation) Juventus
8	DF	Jayde Riviere	22 January 2001 (aged 21)	31	1	(United States Soccer Federation) Michigan Wolverines
9	FW	Jordyn Huitema	8 May 2001 (aged 21)	49	14	(United States Soccer Federation) OL Reign
10	DF	Ashley Lawrence	11 June 1995 (aged 27)	105	7	(French Football Federation) Paris Saint-Germain
11	MF	Desiree Scott	31 July 1987 (aged 34)	176	0	(United States Soccer Federation) Kansas City Current
12	FW	Christine Sinclair (captain)	12 June 1983 (aged 39)	310	189	(United States Soccer Federation) Portland Thorns
13	MF	Sophie Schmidt	28 June 1988 (aged 34)	213	19	(United States Soccer Federation) Houston Dash
14	DF	Vanessa Gilles	11 March 1996 (aged 26)	19	2	(United States Soccer Federation) Angel City
15	FW	Nichelle Prince	19 February 1995 (aged 27)	79	13	(United States Soccer Federation) Houston Dash
16	FW	Janine Beckie	20 August 1994 (aged 27)	88	34	(United States Soccer Federation) Portland Thorns
17	MF	Jessie Fleming	11 March 1998 (aged 24)	99	15	(The Football Association) Chelsea
18	GK	Sabrina D'Angelo	11 May 1993 (aged 29)	10	0	(Swedish Football Association) Vittsjö GIK
19	FW	Adriana Leon	2 October 1992 (aged 29)	80	23	(The Football Association) West Ham United
20	FW	Cloé Lacasse	7 July 1993 (aged 28)	6	0	(Portuguese Football Federation) Benfica
21	MF	Zoe Burns	5 January 2002 (aged 20)	1	0	(United States Soccer Federation) USC Trojans
22	GK	Lysianne Proulx	17 April 1999 (aged 23)	0	0	Unattached
23	DF	Bianca St-Georges	28 July 1997 (aged 24)	1	0	(United States Soccer Federation) Chicago Red Stars

=== Costa Rica ===
The 23-player roster was announced on 29 June 2022.

Head coach: Amelia Valverde

No.	Pos.	Player	Date of birth (age)	Caps	Goals	Club
1	GK	Noelia Bermúdez	20 September 1994 (aged 27)	25	0	(Costa Rican Football Federation) Alajuelense
2	DF	Gabriela Guillén	1 March 1992 (aged 30)	51	1	(Costa Rican Football Federation) Alajuelense
3	DF	María Coto	2 March 1998 (aged 24)	5	0	(Costa Rican Football Federation) Alajuelense
4	DF	Mariana Benavides	26 December 1994 (aged 27)	34	4	(Costa Rican Football Federation) Herediano
5	DF	Valeria del Campo	15 December 2000 (aged 21)	1	0	(Mexican Football Federation) Monterrey
6	DF	Carol Sánchez	16 April 1986 (aged 36)	54	5	(Costa Rican Football Federation) Sporting San José
7	FW	Melissa Herrera	10 October 1996 (aged 25)	47	20	(French Football Federation) Bordeaux
8	DF	Daniela Cruz	8 March 1991 (aged 31)	47	7	(Costa Rican Football Federation) Saprissa
9	FW	Carolina Venegas	28 September 1991 (aged 30)	51	17	(Costa Rican Football Federation) Saprissa
10	MF	Shirley Cruz	28 August 1985 (aged 36)	91	29	(Costa Rican Football Federation) Alajuelense
11	MF	Raquel Rodríguez (captain)	28 October 1993 (aged 28)	74	43	(United States Soccer Federation) Portland Thorns
12	DF	Lixy Rodríguez	4 November 1990 (aged 31)	75	2	(Costa Rican Football Federation) Alajuelense
13	MF	Emilie Valenciano	15 February 1997 (aged 25)	4	0	(Costa Rican Football Federation) Sporting San José
14	MF	Priscila Chinchilla	11 July 2001 (aged 20)	18	9	(Scottish Football Association) Glasgow City
15	FW	Cristin Granados	19 August 1989 (aged 32)	74	12	(Costa Rican Football Federation) Sporting San José
16	MF	Katherine Alvarado	11 April 1991 (aged 31)	75	20	(Costa Rican Football Federation) Saprissa
17	FW	Michelle Montero	29 August 1994 (aged 27)	1	1	(Costa Rican Football Federation) Pérez Zeledón
18	GK	Priscilla Tapia	2 May 1991 (aged 31)	7	0	(Costa Rican Football Federation) Herediano
19	FW	María Paula Salas	12 July 2002 (aged 19)	23	5	Unattached
20	FW	Fabiola Villalobos	13 March 1998 (aged 24)	14	2	(Costa Rican Football Federation) Alajuelense
21	MF	Viviana Chinchilla	21 December 1994 (aged 27)	1	0	(Costa Rican Football Federation) Alajuelense
22	DF	Cristel Sandí	23 January 1998 (aged 24)	2	0	(Costa Rican Football Federation) Saprissa
23	GK	Daniela Solera	21 July 1997 (aged 24)	5	0	(Royal Spanish Football Federation) Santa Teresa

=== Panama ===
The 23-player roster was announced on 26 June 2022.

Head coach: (Mexico) Ignacio Quintana

No.	Pos.	Player	Date of birth (age)	Caps	Goals	Club
1	GK	Sasha Fábrega	23 October 1990 (aged 31)	2	0	(Panamanian Football Federation) Tauro
2	DF	Hilary Jaén	29 August 2002 (aged 19)	14	0	(Panamanian Football Federation) Tauro
3	DF	Carina Reyes	1 July 1998 (aged 24)	2	1	(Football Association of Serbia) Spartak Subotica
4	MF	Katherine Castillo	23 March 1996 (aged 26)	16	2	(Panamanian Football Federation) Tauro
5	DF	Yomira Pinzón	23 August 1996 (aged 25)	18	4	(Costa Rican Football Federation) Saprissa
6	MF	Deysiré Salazar	4 May 2004 (aged 18)	6	0	(Panamanian Football Federation) Tauro
7	MF	Kenia Rangel	6 August 1995 (aged 26)	19	5	(Costa Rican Football Federation) Alajuelense
8	MF	Laurie Batista	29 May 1996 (aged 26)	19	4	(Panamanian Football Federation) Tauro
9	MF	Karla Riley	18 September 1997 (aged 24)	15	8	(Panamanian Football Federation) Tauro
10	FW	Marta Cox	20 July 1997 (aged 24)	18	7	(Mexican Football Federation) Pachuca
11	FW	Shayari Camarena	13 October 2003 (aged 18)	2	0	(Panamanian Football Federation) Tauro
12	GK	Yenith Bailey	29 March 2001 (aged 21)	8	0	(Costa Rican Football Federation) Dimas Escazú
13	DF	Wendy Natis	19 August 2002 (aged 19)	1	0	(Colombian Football Federation) América de Cali
14	DF	Yerenis De León	23 February 1995 (aged 27)	9	2	(Costa Rican Football Federation) Sporting San José
15	MF	María Guevara	4 October 2000 (aged 21)	7	1	(Panamanian Football Federation) Atlético Nacional
16	DF	Rebeca Espinosa	5 July 1992 (aged 29)	6	0	(Panamanian Football Federation) Plaza Amador
17	MF	Gabriela Villagrand	12 January 1999 (aged 23)	6	2	(United States Soccer Federation) Angelo State Rams
18	FW	Erika Hernández	17 March 1999 (aged 23)	18	3	(Panamanian Football Federation) Plaza Amador
19	FW	Lineth Cedeño	5 December 2000 (aged 21)	13	7	(Italian Football Federation) Hellas Verona
20	MF	Schiandra González	4 July 1995 (aged 27)	2	0	(Panamanian Football Federation) Plaza Amador
21	FW	Nicole De Obaldía	16 March 2000 (aged 22)	2	0	(Costa Rican Football Federation) Sporting San José
22	GK	Nadia Ducreux	26 January 1992 (aged 30)	1	0	(Panamanian Football Federation) Sporting San Miguelito
23	DF	Rosario Vargas	9 August 2002 (aged 19)	1	0	(Royal Spanish Football Federation) Valencia B

=== Trinidad and Tobago ===
A 25-player travelling roster was announced on 21 June 2022. The final 23-player roster was announced on 1 July 2022.

Head coach: Kenwyne Jones

No.	Pos.	Player	Date of birth (age)	Caps	Goals	Club
1	GK	Kimika Forbes	28 August 1990 (aged 31)	13	0	Unattached
2	DF	Chelsi Jadoo	21 March 1998 (aged 24)	2	0	(Portuguese Football Federation) Valadares Gaia
3	DF	Cecily Stoute	26 October 1999 (aged 22)	4	1	(United States Soccer Federation) Georgia Bulldogs
4	DF	Rhea Belgrave	19 July 1991 (aged 30)	19	2	(Trinidad and Tobago Football Association) Police
5	DF	Shaunalee Govia	2 November 1998 (aged 23)	2	0	Unattached
6	MF	Kédie Johnson	19 November 2000 (aged 21)	3	0	(United States Soccer Federation) FIU Panthers
7	DF	Liana Hinds	23 February 1995 (aged 27)	19	2	(Scottish Football Association) Hibernian
8	DF	Victoria Swift	29 January 1995 (aged 27)	5	0	Unattached
9	FW	Brianna Austin	31 March 1999 (aged 23)	0	0	(United States Soccer Federation) Florida Atlantic Owls
10	MF	Asha James	5 December 1999 (aged 22)	5	4	(United States Soccer Federation) West Texas A&M Buffaloes
11	FW	Raenah Campbell	28 February 1999 (aged 23)	4	2	Unattached
12	MF	Chelcy Ralph	15 December 1998 (aged 23)	6	3	(United States Soccer Federation) Ball State Cardinals
13	DF	Amaya Ellis	31 October 1999 (aged 22)	2	0	(United States Soccer Federation) Johns Hopkins Blue Jays
14	MF	Karyn Forbes (captain)	27 August 1991 (aged 30)	21	7	(Trinidad and Tobago Football Association) Police
15	FW	Tori Paul	22 August 2002 (aged 19)	0	0	(United States Soccer Federation) Maryland Terrapins
16	FW	Cayla McFarlane	10 June 2002 (aged 20)	4	0	(United States Soccer Federation) Harvard Crimson
17	FW	Jolie St. Louis	7 April 2003 (aged 19)	0	0	(United States Soccer Federation) Seattle Redhawks
18	MF	Maria-Frances Serrant	14 November 2002 (aged 19)	4	2	(United States Soccer Federation) Corban Warriors
19	FW	Maya Matouk	30 March 1998 (aged 24)	3	2	(Trinidad and Tobago Football Association) Police
20	DF	Lauryn Hutchinson	12 June 1991 (aged 31)	13	3	Unattached
21	GK	Tenesha Palmer	16 September 1994 (aged 27)	3	0	(Trinidad and Tobago Football Association) Police
22	GK	Klil Keshwar	17 July 2000 (aged 21)	1	0	(United States Soccer Federation) St. Francis Brooklyn Terriers
23	MF	Sarah De Gannes	22 September 2002 (aged 19)	2	0	(United States Soccer Federation) Western Illinois Leathernecks

== Player representation ==
=== By club ===
Clubs with 4 or more players represented are listed.

Players	Club
8	(Costa Rica) Alajuelense
7	(Panama) Tauro, (United States) OL Reign, (United States) Washington Spirit
6	(Mexico) Tigres UANL
5	(Costa Rica) Saprissa, (Costa Rica) Sporting San José (United States) Portland Thorns
4	(Mexico) Guadalajara, (Trinidad and Tobago) Police, (United States) Houston Dash, (United States) San Diego Wave

=== By club nationality ===
Players	Clubs
65	United States
22	Costa Rica
17	Mexico
16	France
12	Panama
11	England
6	Haiti
4	Scotland, Trinidad and Tobago
3	Canada, Spain
2	Italy, Portugal, Sweden
1	Colombia, Lithuania, Serbia

=== By club federation ===
Players	Federation
129	CONCACAF
42	UEFA
1	CONMEBOL

=== By representatives of domestic league ===
National squad	Players
United States	22
Costa Rica	17
Mexico	15
Panama	12
Haiti	6
Trinidad and Tobago	4
Canada	0
Jamaica	0
