= 2023 FIFA Women's World Cup Group D =

Football tournament teams

Group D of the 2023 FIFA Women's World Cup was one of eight groups that formed the opening round of the tournament with the matches played from 22 July to 1 August 2023. The group consisted of England, Haiti, Denmark and China. The top two teams, England and Denmark, advanced to the round of 16.

China failed to qualify for the Women's World Cup knockout stage for the first time ever, appearing in all knockout stages until 2019. England avoided that fate by winning all three group fixtures for only the second time and scoring more group stage goals than ever before. Denmark qualified for the Women's World Cup knockout stage for the first time since 1995, a tournament where both they and England were eliminated in the quarter-finals.

== Teams ==
Draw position	Team	Pot	Confederation	Method of qualification	Date of qualification	Finals appearance	Last appearance	Previous best performance	FIFA Rankings	
Draw position	Team	Pot	Confederation	Method of qualification	Date of qualification	Finals appearance	Last appearance	Previous best performance	October 2022 (Note: The rankings of October 2022 were used for seeding for the final draw.)	June 2023
D1	England	1	UEFA	UEFA Group D winners	3 September 2022	6th	2019	Third place (2015)	4	4
D2	Haiti	4 (Note: As the identity of the inter-confederation play-off Group B winners was not known at the time of the final draw, positions in the FIFA Rankings were not taken into account, and the placeholder in the draw was automatically seeded into pot 4.)	CONCACAF	Inter-confederation play-off Group B winners	22 February 2023	1st	—	Debut	56	53
D3	Denmark	3	UEFA	UEFA Group E winners	2 May 2022	5th	2007	Quarter-finals (1991, 1995)	18	13
D4	China	2	AFC	2022 AFC Women's Asian Cup champions	30 January 2022	8th	2019	Runners-up (1999)	15	14

== Standings ==
Pos	Team	Pld	W	D	L	GF	GA	GD	Pts	Qualification
1	England	3	3	0	0	8	1	+7	9	Advance to knockout stage
2	Denmark	3	2	0	1	3	1	+2	6	Advance to knockout stage
3	China	3	1	0	2	2	7	−5	3	
4	Haiti	3	0	0	3	0	4	−4	0	

Source: FIFA
Rules for classification: Group stage tiebreakers

In the round of 16:

- The winners of Group D, England, advanced to play the runners-up of Group B, Nigeria.
- The runners-up of Group D, Denmark, advanced to play the winners of Group B, Australia.

== Matches ==
All times listed are local.

=== England vs Haiti ===
22 July 2023
19:30 UTC+10

England	1–0	Haiti
Stanway 29' (pen.)	Report

Lang Park, Brisbane
Attendance: 44,369
Referee: Emikar Calderas (Venezuela)

England	Haiti

GK	1	Mary Earps
RB	2	Lucy Bronze
CB	6	Millie Bright (c)
CB	16	Jess Carter
LB	5	Alex Greenwood
DM	4	Keira Walsh
CM	8	Georgia Stanway	(yellow card) 45+9'
CM	10	Ella Toone
RF	18	Chloe Kelly
CF	23	Alessia Russo		(substituted off) 76'
LF	11	Lauren Hemp	(yellow card) 51'	(substituted off) 61'
Substitutions:
FW	7	Lauren James		(substituted on) 61'
FW	9	Rachel Daly		(substituted on) 76'
Manager:
(Netherlands) Sarina Wiegman

GK	1	Kerly Théus
RB	13	Betina Petit-Frère
CB	3	Jennyfer Limage		(substituted off) 31'
CB	4	Tabita Joseph
LB	20	Kethna Louis
RM	7	Batcheba Louis		(substituted off) 90+3'
CM	9	Sherly Jeudy
CM	19	Dayana Pierre-Louis	(yellow card) 19'
LM	10	Nérilia Mondésir (c)
CF	6	Melchie Dumornay
CF	22	Roselord Borgella		(substituted off) 78'
Substitutions:
DF	21	Ruthny Mathurin		(substituted on) 31'
FW	11	Roseline Éloissaint		(substituted on) 76'
FW	15	Darlina Joseph		(substituted on) 90+3'
Manager:
(France) Nicolas Delépine

Player of the Match:
Georgia Stanway (England)

Assistant referees:
Migdalia Rodríguez Chirino (Venezuela)
Mary Blanco Bolívar (Colombia)
Fourth official:
Marianela Araya (Costa Rica)
Video assistant referee:
Juan Soto (Venezuela)
Assistant video assistant referee:
Nicolás Gallo (Colombia)
Offside video assistant referee:
Neuza Back (Brazil)

=== Denmark vs China ===
22 July 2023
20:00 UTC+8

Denmark	1–0	China
Vangsgaard 90'	Report

Perth Rectangular Stadium, Perth
Attendance: 16,989
Referee: Marie-Soleil Beaudoin (Canada)

Denmark	China

GK	1	Lene Christensen
RB	4	Rikke Sevecke	(yellow card) 40'
CB	3	Stine Ballisager
CB	5	Simone Boye
LB	11	Katrine Veje
DM	6	Karen Holmgaard
CM	2	Josefine Hasbo
CM	12	Kathrine Møller Kühl		(substituted off) 62'
RF	19	Janni Thomsen		(substituted off) 85'
CF	10	Pernille Harder (c)
LF	14	Nicoline Sørensen		(substituted off) 72'
Substitutions:
FW	20	Signe Bruun		(substituted on) 62'
FW	17	Rikke Madsen		(substituted on) 72'
FW	9	Amalie Vangsgaard		(substituted on) 85'
Manager:
Lars Søndergaard

GK	12	Xu Huan
RB	2	Li Mengwen	(substituted off) 85'
CB	11	Wang Shanshan (c)
CB	8	Yao Wei
LB	15	Chen Qiaozhu
RM	6	Zhang Xin	(substituted off) 46'
CM	10	Zhang Rui
CM	13	Yang Lina
LM	19	Zhang Linyan
CF	17	Wu Chengshu	(substituted off) 90+1'
CF	14	Lou Jiahui	(substituted off) 78'
Substitutions:
FW	7	Wang Shuang	(substituted on) 46'
MF	9	Shen Mengyu	(substituted on) 78'
DF	23	Gao Chen	(substituted on) 85'
MF	21	Gu Yasha	(substituted on) 90+1'
Manager:
Shui Qingxia

Player of the Match:
Amalie Vangsgaard (Denmark)

Assistant referees:
Chantal Boudreau (Canada)
Stephanie Yee Sing (Jamaica)
Fourth official:
Akhona Makalima (South Africa)
Video assistant referee:
Armando Villarreal (United States)
Assistant video assistant referee:
Alejandro Hernández Hernández (Spain)
Offside video assistant referee:
Shirley Perelló (Honduras)

=== England vs Denmark ===
28 July 2023
18:30 UTC+10

England	1–0	Denmark
James 6'	Report

Sydney Football Stadium, Sydney
Attendance: 40,439
Referee: Tess Olofsson (Sweden)

England	Denmark

GK	1	Mary Earps
RB	2	Lucy Bronze
CB	6	Millie Bright (c)
CB	5	Alex Greenwood
LB	9	Rachel Daly
DM	4	Keira Walsh	(substituted off) 38'
CM	10	Ella Toone	(substituted off) 76'
CM	8	Georgia Stanway
RF	18	Chloe Kelly
CF	23	Alessia Russo	(substituted off) 76'
LF	7	Lauren James
Substitutions:
MF	17	Laura Coombs	(substituted on) 38'
FW	11	Lauren Hemp	(substituted on) 76'
FW	19	Bethany England	(substituted on) 76'
Manager:
(Netherlands) Sarina Wiegman

GK	1	Lene Christensen
RB	4	Rikke Sevecke
CB	3	Stine Ballisager	(substituted off) 76'
CB	5	Simone Boye
LB	11	Katrine Veje
CM	2	Josefine Hasbo	(substituted off) 71'
CM	6	Karen Holmgaard	(substituted off) 87'
RW	19	Janni Thomsen
AM	12	Kathrine Møller Kühl
LW	17	Rikke Madsen	(substituted off) 76'
CF	10	Pernille Harder (c)
Substitutions:
FW	9	Amalie Vangsgaard	(substituted on) 71'
DF	15	Frederikke Thøgersen	(substituted on) 76'
MF	14	Nicoline Sørensen	(substituted on) 76'
MF	7	Sanne Troelsgaard Nielsen	(substituted on) 87'
Manager:
Lars Søndergaard

Player of the Match:
Lauren James (England)

Assistant referees:
Lucie Ratajová (Czech Republic)
Polyxeni Irodotou (Cyprus)
Fourth official:
Oh Hyeon-jeong (South Korea)
Video assistant referee:
Tatiana Guzmán (Nicaragua)
Assistant video assistant referee:
Carol Anne Chenard (Canada)
Offside video assistant referee:
Kathryn Nesbitt (United States)

=== China vs Haiti ===
28 July 2023
20:30 UTC+9:30

China	1–0	Haiti
Wang Shuang 74' (pen.)	Report

Hindmarsh Stadium, Adelaide
Attendance: 12,675
Referee: Marta Huerta de Aza (Spain)

China	Haiti

GK	1	Zhu Yu
RB	2	Li Mengwen
CB	11	Wang Shanshan (c)
CB	8	Yao Wei
LB	15	Chen Qiaozhu
DM	16	Yao Lingwei		(substituted off) 82'
CM	10	Zhang Rui	(red card) 29'
CM	13	Yang Lina
RF	17	Wu Chengshu		(substituted off) 46'
CF	14	Lou Jiahui		(substituted off) 37'
LF	19	Zhang Linyan		(substituted off) 88'
Substitutions:
MF	6	Zhang Xin		(substituted on) 37'
FW	7	Wang Shuang		(substituted on) 46'
DF	3	Dou Jiaxing		(substituted on) 82'
FW	18	Tang Jiali		(substituted on) 88'
Manager:
Shui Qingxia

GK	1	Kerly Théus
RB	13	Betina Petit-Frère
CB	4	Tabita Joseph
CB	20	Kethna Louis
LB	21	Ruthny Mathurin		(substituted off) 81'
CM	5	Maudeline Moryl		(substituted off) 46'
CM	19	Dayana Pierre-Louis		(substituted off) 81'
RW	7	Batcheba Louis		(substituted off) 64'
AM	9	Sherly Jeudy		(substituted off) 89'
LW	10	Nérilia Mondésir (c)
CF	22	Roselord Borgella
Substitutions:
MF	6	Melchie Dumornay	(yellow card) 63'	(substituted on) 46'
FW	11	Roseline Éloissaint		(substituted on) 64'
DF	2	Chelsea Surpris		(substituted on) 81'
MF	8	Danielle Étienne		(substituted on) 81'
FW	17	Shwendesky Joseph		(substituted on) 89'
Manager:
(France) Nicolas Delépine			(yellow card) 90+13'

Player of the Match:
Wang Shuang (China)

Assistant referees:
Guadalupe Porras Ayuso (Spain)
Sanja Rođak-Karšić (Croatia)
Fourth official:
Marianela Araya (Costa Rica)
Video assistant referee:
Alejandro Hernández Hernández (Spain)
Assistant video assistant referee:
Juan Martínez Munuera (Spain)
Offside video assistant referee:
Mariana de Almeida (Argentina)

=== China vs England ===
1 August 2023
20:30 UTC+9:30

China	1–6	England
Wang Shuang 57' (pen.)	Report	Russo 4'; Hemp 26'; James 41', 65'; Kelly 77'; Daly 84'

Hindmarsh Stadium, Adelaide
Attendance: 13,497
Referee: Casey Reibelt (Australia)

China	England

GK	1	Zhu Yu
RB	2	Li Mengwen	(substituted off) 75'
CB	11	Wang Shanshan (c)
CB	8	Yao Wei
LB	15	Chen Qiaozhu
RM	17	Wu Chengshu	(substituted off) 90+3'
CM	16	Yao Lingwei	(substituted off) 90+3'
CM	13	Yang Lina
LM	19	Zhang Linyan
CF	7	Wang Shuang	(substituted off) 75'
CF	14	Lou Jiahui	(substituted off) 90+11'
Substitutions:
DF	5	Wu Haiyan	(substituted on) 75'
MF	21	Gu Yasha	(substituted on) 75'
DF	3	Dou Jiaxing	(substituted on) 90+3'
MF	9	Shen Mengyu	(substituted on) 90+3'
DF	4	Wang Linlin	(substituted on) 90+11'
Manager:
Shui Qingxia

GK	1	Mary Earps
CB	16	Jess Carter
CB	6	Millie Bright (c)
CB	5	Alex Greenwood
RM	2	Lucy Bronze	(yellow card) 56'	(substituted off) 71'
CM	8	Georgia Stanway		(substituted off) 46'
CM	20	Katie Zelem
LM	9	Rachel Daly
RF	7	Lauren James		(substituted off) 81'
CF	23	Alessia Russo		(substituted off) 71'
LF	11	Lauren Hemp		(substituted off) 71'
Substitutions:
MF	17	Laura Coombs		(substituted on) 46'
FW	18	Chloe Kelly		(substituted on) 71'
FW	19	Bethany England		(substituted on) 71'
DF	3	Niamh Charles		(substituted on) 71'
MF	10	Ella Toone		(substituted on) 81'
Manager:
(Netherlands) Sarina Wiegman

Player of the Match:
Lauren James (England)

Assistant referees:
Ramina Tsoi (Kyrgyzstan)
Heba Saadieh (Palestine)
Fourth official:
Marianela Araya (Costa Rica)
Video assistant referee:
Juan Soto (Venezuela)
Assistant video assistant referee:
Daiane Muniz dos Santos (Brazil)
Offside video assistant referee:
Shirley Perello (Honduras)

=== Haiti vs Denmark ===
1 August 2023
19:00 UTC+8

Haiti	0–2	Denmark
	Report	Harder 21' (pen.); Troelsgaard 90+10'

Perth Rectangular Stadium, Perth
Attendance: 17,897
Referee: Oh Hyeon-jeong (South Korea)

Haiti	Denmark

GK	1	Kerly Théus
RB	2	Chelsea Surpris
CB	13	Betina Petit-Frère	(substituted off) 87'
CB	4	Tabita Joseph
LB	20	Kethna Louis
RM	11	Roseline Éloissaint
CM	9	Sherly Jeudy
CM	19	Dayana Pierre-Louis	(substituted off) 67'
LM	7	Batcheba Louis
CF	6	Melchie Dumornay
CF	10	Nérilia Mondésir (c)
Substitutions:
FW	22	Roselord Borgella	(substituted on) 67'
DF	21	Ruthny Mathurin	(substituted on) 87'
Manager:
(France) Nicolas Delépine

GK	1	Lene Christensen
RB	19	Janni Thomsen
CB	4	Rikke Sevecke
CB	5	Simone Boye
LB	11	Katrine Veje
RM	14	Nicoline Sørensen		(substituted off) 63'
CM	12	Kathrine Møller Kühl		(substituted off) 80'
CM	6	Karen Holmgaard	(yellow card) 66'	(substituted off) 80'
LM	17	Rikke Madsen		(substituted off) 63'
CF	9	Amalie Vangsgaard
CF	10	Pernille Harder (c)		(substituted off) 90+2'
Substitutions:
FW	20	Signe Bruun		(substituted on) 63'
FW	21	Mille Gejl		(substituted on) 63'
MF	7	Sanne Troelsgaard Nielsen		(substituted on) 80'
MF	2	Josefine Hasbo		(substituted on) 80'
DF	18	Luna Gevitz		(substituted on) 90+2'
Manager:
Lars Søndergaard

Player of the Match:
Pernille Harder (Denmark)

Assistant referees:
Park Mi-suk (South Korea)
Makoto Bozono (Japan)
Fourth official:
Akhona Makalima (South Africa)
Video assistant referee:
Muhammad Taqi (Singapore)
Assistant video assistant referee:
Abdulla Al-Marri (Qatar)
Offside video assistant referee:
Neuza Back (Brazil)

== Discipline ==
Fair play points would have been used as tiebreakers in the group should the overall and head-to-head records of teams were tied. These were calculated based on yellow and red cards received in all group matches as follows:

- first yellow card: minus 1 point;
- indirect red card (second yellow card): minus 3 points;
- direct red card: minus 4 points;
- yellow card and direct red card: minus 5 points;

Only one of the above deductions was applied to a player in a single match.

Team	Match 1				Match 2				Match 3				Points
Team	Booked	(yellow card) (yellow-red card)	Sent off (straight red)	(yellow card) (red card)	Booked	(yellow card) (yellow-red card)	Sent off (straight red)	(yellow card) (red card)	Booked	(yellow card) (yellow-red card)	Sent off (straight red)	(yellow card) (red card)	Points
Denmark	1								1				–2
England	2								1				–3
Haiti	1				1								–2
China							1						–4

== See also ==
- China at the FIFA Women's World Cup
- Denmark at the FIFA Women's World Cup
- England at the FIFA Women's World Cup
- Haiti at the FIFA Women's World Cup
