= 2019 Sud Ladies Cup squads =

The 2019 Sud Ladies Cup was an international association football tournament held in Provence-Alpes-Côte d'Azur, France. The six national teams involved in the tournament were required to register a squad of 22 players; only players in these squads were eligible to take part in the tournament.

== France ==
Head coach: (France) Gilles Eyquem

No.	Pos.	Player	Date of birth (age)	Club
1	GK	Justine Lerond	29 February 2000 (aged 19)	(French Football Federation) FC Metz
1*	GK	Mary Innebeer	2 November 2001 (aged 17)	(French Football Federation) Lille OSC
2	DF	Laura Riquelme Jouanin	13 November 2001 (aged 17)	(French Football Federation) Toulouse FC
3	DF	Fiona Bogi	23 January 2000 (aged 19)	(French Football Federation) Montpellier HSC
4	DF	Émeline Saint-Georges	5 April 2000 (aged 19)	(French Football Federation) US Saint-Malo
5	DF	Maëlle Lakrar	27 May 2000 (aged 18)	(French Football Federation) Montpellier HSC
6	MF	Oriane Jean-François	14 August 2001 (aged 17)	(French Football Federation) Paris FC
7	FW	Kessya Bussy	19 June 2001 (aged 17)	(French Football Federation) US Orléans
8	MF	Sonia Ouchène	14 March 2000 (aged 19)	(Royal Spanish Football Federation) Valencia CF
9	FW	Amélie Delabre	26 November 2000 (aged 18)	(French Football Federation) FC Metz
10	MF	Margaux Le Mouël	8 August 2001 (aged 17)	(French Football Federation) EA Guingamp
11	FW	Sandy Baltimore	19 February 2000 (aged 19)	(French Football Federation) Paris Saint-Germain
12	DF	Lisa Martinez	13 June 2000 (aged 18)	(French Football Federation) Montpellier HSC
13	DF	Emmy Jézéquel	21 February 2001 (aged 18)	(French Football Federation) EA Guingamp
14	DF	Maëva Bernard	18 July 2001 (aged 17)	(French Football Federation) AS Saint-Étienne
15	DF	Amanda Chaney	17 March 2000 (aged 19)	(French Football Federation) Dijon FCO
16	GK	Manon Wahl	27 June 2001 (aged 17)	(German Football Association) SC Sand
17	MF	Chloé Philippe	21 January 2000 (aged 19)	(French Football Federation) Stade de Reims
18	MF	Mélanie Ribeiro de Carvalho	12 September 2000 (aged 18)	(French Football Federation) Paris FC
19	MF	Chaïma Badr Bassem	7 December 2001 (aged 17)	(French Football Federation) Toulouse FC
20	FW	Mickaëlla Cardia	16 March 2000 (aged 19)	(French Football Federation) Olympique de Marseille
21	FW	Naomie Feller	6 November 2001 (aged 17)	(French Football Federation) Stade de Reims
22	FW	Amandine Béché	12 November 2001 (aged 17)	(French Football Federation) EA Guingamp

== Gabon ==
Head coach: (Gabon) Jeanne Moussavou

No.	Pos.	Player	Date of birth (age)	Club
1	GK	Marie Nurlie Okila Ndzila	27 August 2001 (aged 17)	(Gabonese Football Federation) FF Ballon d'Or
2	DF	Tatiana Monique Asseng Obounet	18 January 2004 (aged 15)	(Gabonese Football Federation) Tristar FC
3	MF	Julienne Paho Kombi	3 February 2000 (aged 19)	(Gabonese Football Federation) Tristar FC
4	DF	Lenayick Ntsame Obame	3 June 2003 (aged 15)	(Gabonese Football Federation) CF Altesse
5	MF	Erica Eyang	16 March 2000 (aged 19)	(Gabonese Football Federation) Tristar FC
6	DF	Orly Caprile Zeh Ovono	15 August 2000 (aged 18)	(Gabonese Football Federation) US Bitam
7	FW	Nicole Katya Rouchard Ozega	25 February 2002 (aged 17)	(Gabonese Football Federation) Tristar FC
8	MF	Isia Lucredia Ibogni Mouiti	10 April 2000 (aged 19)	(Gabonese Football Federation) Munadji FC
9	MF	Tania Avome Engone	20 April 2001 (aged 18)	(Gabonese Football Federation) CF Altesse
10	FW	Victorine Biatholi Maimouna	14 May 2003 (aged 15)	(Gabonese Football Federation) CF Altesse
11	MF	Elvina Madanie Ntogone Mezui	20 November 2002 (aged 16)	(Gabonese Football Federation) US Bitam
12	DF	Wandy Elodie Ongongone	10 October 2001 (aged 17)	(Gabonese Football Federation) FF Ballon d'Or
13	MF	Belinda Dixie Ondjani Ampagui	29 February 2000 (aged 19)	(Gabonese Football Federation) Amazones FC
14	MF	Grace Miria Aloung Mba	16 September 2000 (aged 18)	(Gabonese Football Federation) AS Pélican
15	MF	Berthe Océane Bivigou	7 August 2002 (aged 16)	(Gabonese Football Federation) CF Altesse
16	GK	Richka Minkue Me Nguema	20 May 2003 (aged 15)	(Gabonese Football Federation) CF Altesse
17	MF	Louise Cryna Assa Ekogha	10 November 2002 (aged 16)	(Gabonese Football Federation) FF Ballon d'Or
18	FW	Jessy Ornella Mezui Obiang	11 November 2001 (aged 17)	(Gabonese Football Federation) US Oyem
19	DF	Samirha Mboma Wissy	27 December 2000 (aged 18)	(Gabonese Football Federation) FF Ballon d'Or
20	FW	Aissatou Baba	6 February 2002 (aged 17)	(Gabonese Football Federation) US Bitam
22	GK	Chouelzea Elycia Mazei Boubadi	15 December 2000 (aged 18)	(Gabonese Football Federation) AS Pélican

== Haiti ==
Head coach: (Venezuela) Gerardo Contreras

No.	Pos.	Player	Date of birth (age)	Club
1	GK	Madelina Fleuriot	28 October 2003 (aged 15)	(Haitian Football Federation) EXAFOOT
2	DF	Tabita Joseph	13 September 2003 (aged 15)	(Haitian Football Federation) AS Tigresses
3	DF	Nancy Lindor	18 November 2001 (aged 17)	(Haitian Football Federation) EXAFOOT
4	DF	Ruthny Mathurin	14 January 2001 (aged 18)	(Haitian Football Federation) AS Tigresses
5	DF	Esthericove Joseph	5 February 2003 (aged 16)	(Haitian Football Federation) EXAFOOT
6	MF	Dieunica Jean-Baptiste	27 February 2001 (aged 18)	(Haitian Football Federation) Aigle Brillant FC
7	FW	Abaïna Louis	29 November 2001 (aged 17)	(Haitian Football Federation) AS Tigresses
8	MF	Angeline Gustave	30 January 2001 (aged 18)	(Haitian Football Federation) AS Tigresses
9	FW	Darlina Joseph	15 December 2003 (aged 15)	(Haitian Football Federation) Don Bosco FC
10	MF	Danielle Étienne	16 January 2001 (aged 18)	(United States Soccer Federation) New York City FC
11	FW	Rachelle Caremus	3 February 2003 (aged 16)	(Haitian Football Federation) Aigle Brillant FC
12	GK	Edjenie Joseph	20 April 2001 (aged 18)	(Haitian Football Federation) AS Tigresses
13	FW	Valentina Ornis	22 August 2003 (aged 15)	(Haitian Football Federation) ASF Croix-des-Bouquets
14	FW	Betina Petit-Frère	1 August 2003 (aged 15)	(Haitian Football Federation) EXAFOOT
15	MF	Rose-Alya Marcellus	22 March 2003 (aged 16)	(Haitian Football Federation) ASF Croix-des-Bouquets
16	MF	Dayana Pierre-Louis	24 September 2003 (aged 15)	(Haitian Football Federation) ASF Croix-des-Bouquets
17	FW	Maille Jean	24 August 2001 (aged 17)	(Haitian Football Federation) AS Tigresses
18	DF	Méghane St-Cyr	26 February 2005 (aged 14)	(Canadian Soccer Association) CS St-Hubert
19	MF	Maudeline Moryl	24 January 2003 (aged 16)	(Haitian Football Federation) ASF Croix-des-Bouquets
20	DF	Rose Pierreline France	3 October 2003 (aged 15)	(Haitian Football Federation) ASF Croix-des-Bouquets
21	GK	Nahomie Ambroise	13 November 2003 (aged 15)	(Haitian Football Federation) Anacaona SC

== Japan ==
Head coach: (Japan) Futoshi Ikeda

No.	Pos.	Player	Date of birth (age)	Club
1	GK	Momoko Tanaka	17 March 2000 (aged 19)	(Japan Football Association) Yamato Sylphid
2	DF	Himeno Shirai	25 May 2000 (aged 18)	(Japan Football Association) Albirex Niigata Ladies
3	DF	Shino Matsuda	27 March 2001 (aged 18)	(Japan Football Association) Nippon TV Beleza
4	DF	Nodoka Funaki	10 August 2000 (aged 18)	(Japan Football Association) Waseda University
5	MF	Oto Kanno	30 October 2000 (aged 18)	(Japan Football Association) Nippon TV Beleza
6	MF	Momo Kato	28 January 2001 (aged 18)	(Japan Football Association) NGU Loveledge Nagoya
7	FW	Haruka Miura	2 September 2000 (aged 18)	(Japan Football Association) Nittaidai Fields Yokohama
8	MF	Asumi Takeda	14 July 2000 (aged 18)	(Japan Football Association) Albirex Niigata Ladies
9	FW	Seira Kojima	5 February 2000 (aged 19)	(Japan Football Association) Orca Kamogawa FC
10	FW	Nanako Takeda	17 February 2000 (aged 19)	(Japan Football Association) Mynavi Vegalta Sendai Ladies
11	FW	Sara Imada	24 March 2000 (aged 19)	(Japan Football Association) Teikyo Heisei University
12	MF	Fukina Mizuno	31 January 2001 (aged 18)	(Japan Football Association) INAC Kobe Leonessa
13	FW	Maho Hirosawa	18 October 2000 (aged 18)	(Japan Football Association) Waseda University
14	MF	Momo Nakao	9 March 2002 (aged 17)	(Japan Football Association) JEF United Chiba Ladies
15	DF	Wakaba Goto	4 June 2001 (aged 17)	(Japan Football Association) Nippon TV Menina
16	DF	Ibuki Nagae	3 March 2002 (aged 17)	(Japan Football Association) Fujieda Junshin High School
17	MF	Sara Ito	11 November 2001 (aged 17)	(Japan Football Association) Nippon TV Menina
18	GK	Rena Chikazawa	3 September 2000 (aged 18)	(Japan Football Association) Waseda University
19	MF	Misaki Morita	11 January 2002 (aged 17)	(Japan Football Association) Okayama Sakuyo High School
20	FW	Haruka Osawa	15 April 2001 (aged 18)	(Japan Football Association) JEF United Chiba Ladies
21	GK	Shu Ohba	11 July 2002 (aged 16)	(Japan Football Association) JFA Academy Fukushima
22	DF	Haruna Tabata	27 May 2002 (aged 16)	(Japan Football Association) Cerezo Osaka Sakai Academy

== Mexico ==
Head coach: (Mexico) Mónica Vergara

No.	Pos.	Player	Date of birth (age)	Club
1	GK	Wendy Toledo	13 September 2000 (aged 18)	(Mexican Football Federation) Santos Laguna
2	DF	Reyna Reyes	16 February 2001 (aged 18)	(United States Soccer Federation) Alabama Crimson Tide
3	DF	Nicole Soto	8 July 2001 (aged 17)	(United States Soccer Federation) So Cal Blues
4	DF	Tanna Sánchez	21 December 2001 (aged 17)	(Mexican Football Federation) Borregos Salvajes Puebla
5	DF	Athalie Palomo	7 September 2000 (aged 18)	(United States Soccer Federation) Pittsburgh Panthers
6	MF	Silvana Flores	18 April 2002 (aged 17)	(The Football Association) Arsenal FC Academy
7	FW	Nayeli Díaz	10 October 2001 (aged 17)	(United States Soccer Federation) Arsenal FC USA
8	MF	Nicole Pérez	30 August 2001 (aged 17)	(Mexican Football Federation) Guadalajara
9	FW	Gabriela Juárez	13 April 2000 (aged 19)	(United States Soccer Federation) Princeton Tigers
10	FW	Alison González	31 January 2002 (aged 17)	(Mexican Football Federation) Atlas
11	MF	Anette Vázquez	11 March 2002 (aged 17)	(Mexican Football Federation) Guadalajara
12	GK	Zoe Aguirre	3 October 2000 (aged 18)	(United States Soccer Federation) Eastern Kentucky Colonels
13	DF	Laura Parra	19 December 2000 (aged 18)	(Mexican Football Federation) Toluca
14	DF	Karla Zempoalteca	18 May 2000 (aged 18)	(Mexican Football Federation) León
15	FW	Mayra Ríos	13 March 2000 (aged 19)	(Mexican Football Federation) BUAP
16	MF	Noemí Granados	30 September 2002 (aged 16)	(Mexican Football Federation) Veracruz
17	MF	Natalia Mauleón	4 February 2002 (aged 17)	(Mexican Football Federation) Toluca
18	MF	Alexxandra Ramírez	23 May 2002 (aged 16)	(Mexican Football Federation) Santos Laguna
19	FW	Joseline Hernández	3 March 2000 (aged 19)	(Mexican Football Federation) Santos Laguna
20	FW	Mariel Román	17 November 2002 (aged 16)	(Mexican Football Federation) Toluca

== North Korea ==
Head coach: (North Korea) Song Sung-gwon

No.	Pos.	Player	Date of birth (age)	Club
1	GK	Yun Pyol	4 January 2002 (aged 17)	(DPR Korea Football Association) Naegohyang SC
2	DF	Choe Ryon	25 June 2003 (aged 15)	(DPR Korea Football Association) 4.25 SC
3	DF	Ri Kum-hyang	22 April 2001 (aged 18)	(DPR Korea Football Association) Naegohyang SC
4	DF	Pong Song-ae	30 November 2001 (aged 17)	(DPR Korea Football Association) Naegohyang SC
5	DF	Son Ok-ju	7 March 2000 (aged 19)	(DPR Korea Football Association) Pyongyang SC
6	MF	Ri Su-jong	5 July 2002 (aged 16)	(DPR Korea Football Association) Naegohyang SC
7	MF	Ri Su-gyong	14 April 2003 (aged 16)	(DPR Korea Football Association) Naegohyang SC
8	MF	Ryu Sol-song	27 February 2002 (aged 17)	(DPR Korea Football Association) Naegohyang SC
9	MF	Pang Un-sim	29 June 2001 (aged 17)	(DPR Korea Football Association) Naegohyang SC
10	FW	Kim Ryu-song	26 February 2002 (aged 17)	(DPR Korea Football Association) Naegohyang SC
11	MF	O Si-nae	14 January 2001 (aged 18)	(DPR Korea Football Association) Naegohyang SC
12	MF	Pak Hyon-jong	12 June 2000 (aged 18)	(DPR Korea Football Association) Naegohyang SC
13	DF	Ri Chong-gyong	6 April 2001 (aged 18)	(DPR Korea Football Association) Pyongyang SC
14	FW	Kim Yun-ok	14 March 2003 (aged 16)	(DPR Korea Football Association) Naegohyang SC
15	MF	Yun Ji-hwa	3 January 2002 (aged 17)	(DPR Korea Football Association) Sobaeksu SC
16	MF	Kim Hyang	8 January 2001 (aged 18)	(DPR Korea Football Association) Sobaeksu SC
17	FW	Kim Kyong-yong	2 January 2001 (aged 18)	(DPR Korea Football Association) Naegohyang SC
18	GK	Yu Son-gum	8 November 2003 (aged 15)	(DPR Korea Football Association) Sobaeksu SC
19	FW	Pak Il-gyong	18 April 2002 (aged 17)	(DPR Korea Football Association) Naegohyang SC
20	DF	Jong Yun-mi	4 February 2002 (aged 17)	(DPR Korea Football Association) 4.25 SC
21	DF	Ri Sin-ok	26 May 2003 (aged 15)	(DPR Korea Football Association) Naegohyang SC
