= Jennyfer Limage =

Haitian footballer (born 1997)

Personal information
- Date of birth: 25 December 1997 (age 28)
- Place of birth: Port-au-Prince, Haiti
- Height: 1.80 m (5 ft 11 in)
- Positions: Defensive midfielder; centre-back

Team information
- Current team: Lens
- Number: 3

Senior career*
Years	Team	Apps	(Gls)
–2021	Blainville		
2021–2023	Grenoble	34	(3)
2023–	Lens	3	(0)

International career^{‡}
2015–	Haiti	13	(0)
- * Club domestic league appearances and goals as of 13 October 2024 ‡ National team caps and goals as of 00:56, 4 February 2020 (UTC)

Jennyfer Limage (born 25 December 1997) is a Haitian professional footballer who plays for Seconde Ligue club Lens and the Haiti national team. Mainly a defensive midfielder, she can also operate as a centre-back.

== Club career ==
Limage trained at Ranch de la Croix-des-Bouquets. Limage began her career with the Canadian semi-professional club Blainville, where she suffered a torn ACL. She then joined the French Division 2 club Grenoble Foot 38 in 2021.

== International career ==
On 18 September 2015, Limage made her senior debut for the Haiti women's national team against the United States. In 2023, Limage and her teammates, three of whom play with her in Grenoble (Chelsea Surpris, Maudeline Moryl and Sherly Jeudy) which is also managed by head coach Nicolas Delépine, qualified for the Women's World Cup for the first time in their history.

== Style of play ==
Limage originally started at the left-back position before being converted to centre-back in the Haitian squad. She has also played as a defensive midfielder since her arrival at Grenoble.
