= Haiti at the FIFA Women's World Cup =

The Haiti women's national football team has represented Haiti at the FIFA Women's World Cup on one occasion in 2023.

== 2023 World Cup ==
=== Group D ===
Pos	Team	Pld	W	D	L	GF	GA	GD	Pts	Qualification
1	England	3	3	0	0	8	1	+7	9	Advance to knockout stage
2	Denmark	3	2	0	1	3	1	+2	6	Advance to knockout stage
3	China	3	1	0	2	2	7	−5	3	
4	Haiti	3	0	0	3	0	4	−4	0	

Source: FIFA
22 July 2023
19:30 UTC+10

England	1–0	Haiti
Stanway 29' (pen.)	Report

Lang Park, Brisbane
Attendance: 44,369
Referee: Emikar Calderas Barrera (Venezuela)

28 July 2023
20:30 UTC+9:30

China	1–0	Haiti
Wang Shuang 74' (pen.)	Report

Hindmarsh Stadium, Adelaide
Attendance: 12,675
Referee: Marta Huerta de Aza (Spain)

1 August 2023
19:00 UTC+8

Haiti	0–2	Denmark
	Report	Harder 21' (pen.); Troelsgaard 90+10'

Perth Rectangular Stadium, Perth
Attendance: 17,897
Referee: Oh Hyeon-jeong (South Korea)

== FIFA World Cup record ==
FIFA Women's World Cup record
Year	Result	GP	W	D*	L	GF	GA	GD
(China) 1991	Did not qualify							
(Sweden) 1995	Did not enter							
(United States) 1999	Did not qualify							
(United States) 2003	Did not qualify							
(China) 2007	Did not qualify							
(Germany) 2011	Did not qualify							
(Canada) 2015	Did not qualify							
(France) 2019	Did not qualify							
(Australia) (New Zealand) 2023	Group stage	3	0	0	3	0	4	–4
(Brazil) 2027	To be determined							
(Costa Rica) (Jamaica) (Mexico) (United States) 2031	To be determined							
(United Kingdom) 2035	To be determined							
Total	1/12	3	0	0	3	0	4	–4

*Draws include knockout matches decided on penalty kicks.

== Head-to-head record ==
Opponent	Pld	W	D	L	GF	GA	GD	Win %}
China	1	0	0	1	0	1	−1	0.00
Denmark	1	0	0	1	0	2	−2	0.00
England	1	0	0	1	0	1	−1	0.00
Total	3	0	0	3	0	4	−4	0.00

== Goalscorers ==
Player	Goals	2023
Total	0	0
