= Kethna Louis =

Haitian footballer (born 1996)

Personal information
- Date of birth: 5 August 1996 (age 30)
- Place of birth: Desdunes, Haiti
- Height: 1.77 m (5 ft 10 in)
- Position: Centre-back

Team information
- Current team: Montpellier
- Number: 5

Senior career*
Years	Team	Apps	(Gls)
2018–2019	Issy	20	(2)
2019–2021	Le Havre	32	(4)
2021–2023	Reims	28	(8)
2023–	Montpellier	24	(2)

International career^{‡}
- Haiti U20
2018–	Haiti	23	(7)
- * Club domestic league appearances and goals as of 5 October 2024 ‡ National team caps and goals as of 23:15, 12 September 2022 (UTC)

Kethna Louis (born 5 August 1996) is a Haitian professional footballer who plays as a centre-back for Première Ligue club Montpellier and the Haiti national team.

== International goals ==
Scores and results list Haiti's goal tally first

No.	Date	Venue	Opponent	Score	Result	Competition
1	20 April 2018	Stade Sylvio Cator, Port-au-Prince, Haiti	U.S. Virgin Islands	1–0	14–0	2018 CFU Women's Challenge Series
2	18 February 2023	North Harbour Stadium, Auckland, New Zealand	Senegal	1–0	4–0	2023 FIFA Women's World Cup qualification
3	26 October 2023	SKNFA Technical Center, Basseterre, Saint Kitts and Nevis	Saint Kitts and Nevis	3–0	11–0	2024 CONCACAF W Gold Cup qualification
4	30 October 2023	SKNFA Technical Center, Basseterre, Saint Kitts and Nevis	Saint Kitts and Nevis	1–0	13–0	2024 CONCACAF W Gold Cup qualification
5	30 October 2023	SKNFA Technical Center, Basseterre, Saint Kitts and Nevis	Saint Kitts and Nevis	4–0	13–0	2024 CONCACAF W Gold Cup qualification
