= Kerly Théus =

Haitian footballer (born 1999)

Personal information
- Full name: Kerly Théus
- Date of birth: 7 January 1999 (age 27)
- Place of birth: Canapé Vert, Pétion-Ville, Haiti
- Height: 1.62 m (5 ft 4 in)
- Position: Goalkeeper

Team information
- Current team: Miami AC

Senior career*
| Years | Team | Apps | (Gls) |
| 2019 | Santiago Morning | | |
- Aigle Brillant AC
| 2022–2023 | Miami City | 11 | (0) |
| 2024– | Miami AC | 4 | (0) |

International career^{‡}
| 2018 | Haiti U20 | 10 | (0) |
| | Haiti | 1+ | |
- * Club domestic league appearances and goals as of 12 June 2024 ‡ National team caps and goals as of 03:05, 29 January 2020 (UTC)

Kerly Théus (born 7 January 1999) is a Haitian footballer who plays as a goalkeeper for Miami AC in the USL W League and for the Haiti women's national team.

== Career ==
Théus was a member of the Haiti under-20 national team, appearing for the team in all three matches of the 2018 FIFA U-20 Women's World Cup, the team's first ever major women's international tournament. She has appeared for the senior Haiti national team, including in the 2020 CONCACAF Women's Olympic Qualifying Championship against the United States on 28 January 2020.
