= Madelina Fleuriot =

Haitian footballer (born 2003)

Personal information
- Full name: Madelina Fleuriot
- Date of birth: 28 October 2003 (age 23)
- Place of birth: Léogâne, Haiti
- Height: 1.47 m (4 ft 10 in)
- Position: Goalkeeper

Team information
- Current team: Exafoot

Senior career*
Years	Team	Apps	(Gls)
- Exafoot

International career^{‡}
2017–2018	Haiti U17	7	(0)
2019–	Haiti U19	3	(0)
2018–	Haiti U20		
	Haiti	1+	
- * Club domestic league appearances and goals as of 03:16, 29 January 2020 (UTC) ‡ National team caps and goals as of 03:16, 29 January 2020 (UTC)

Madelina Fleuriot (born 28 October 2003) is a Haitian footballer who plays as a goalkeeper for Exafoot and the Haiti women's national team.

== Career ==
Fleuriot was a member of the Haiti under-20 national team at the 2018 FIFA U-20 Women's World Cup, the team's first ever major women's international tournament, but did not make an appearance. She has appeared for the senior Haiti national team, including in the 2020 CONCACAF Women's Olympic Qualifying Championship qualification against Puerto Rico on 7 October 2019, which finished as a 2–1 win.
