= Roselord Borgella =

Haitian footballer (born 1993)

Personal information
- Date of birth: 1 April 1993 (age 33)
- Place of birth: Léogâne, Haiti
- Height: 1.77 m (5 ft 10 in)
- Positions: Forward; utility player

Senior career*
Years	Team	Apps	(Gls)
2012–2015	FC Indiana	45	(24)
2016	Boston Breakers Reserves	14	(17)
2017	FC Suwon		
2018–2019	Santiago Morning	55	(102)
2020	Maccabi Kishronot Hadera F.C.	7	(10)
2020–2022	GPSO 92 Issy	29	(6)
2022–2023	Dijon	18	(3)
2023–2024	Le Havre	18	(0)
2024–2025	Fenerbahçe	16	(17)
2025–2026	Tijuana	13	(5)

International career^{‡}
2009–2010	Haiti U17	6	(10)
2011–2012	Haiti U20	8	(1)
2011–	Haiti	30	(18)
- * Club domestic league appearances and goals as of 9 February 2026 ‡ National team caps and goals as of 3 December 2023 (UTC)

Roselord Borgella (born 1 April 1993) is a Haitian professional footballer who plays as a forward for Liga MX Femenil club Tijuana and the Haiti national team.

== International goals ==
Scores and results list Haiti's goal tally first

No.	Date	Venue	Opponent	Score	Result	Competition
1.	17 February 2022	Estadio Olímpico Félix Sánchez, Santo Domingo, Dominican Republic	Honduras	4–0	6–0	2022 CONCACAF W Championship qualification
2.	20 February 2022	Estadio Antonio Maceo, Santiago de Cuba, Cuba	Saint Vincent and the Grenadines	1–0	11–0	2022 CONCACAF W Championship qualification
3.	20 February 2022	Estadio Antonio Maceo, Santiago de Cuba, Cuba	Saint Vincent and the Grenadines	5–0	11–0	2022 CONCACAF W Championship qualification
4.	20 February 2022	Estadio Antonio Maceo, Santiago de Cuba, Cuba	Saint Vincent and the Grenadines	8–0	11–0	2022 CONCACAF W Championship qualification
5.	20 February 2022	Estadio Antonio Maceo, Santiago de Cuba, Cuba	Saint Vincent and the Grenadines	11–0	11–0	2022 CONCACAF W Championship qualification
6.	9 April 2022	A. O. Shirley Recreation Ground, Road Town, British Virgin Islands	British Virgin Islands	1–0	21–0	2022 CONCACAF W Championship qualification
7.	9 April 2022	A. O. Shirley Recreation Ground, Road Town, British Virgin Islands	British Virgin Islands	5–0	21–0	2022 CONCACAF W Championship qualification
8.	9 April 2022	A. O. Shirley Recreation Ground, Road Town, British Virgin Islands	British Virgin Islands	6–0	21–0	2022 CONCACAF W Championship qualification
9.	9 April 2022	A. O. Shirley Recreation Ground, Road Town, British Virgin Islands	British Virgin Islands	11–0	21–0	2022 CONCACAF W Championship qualification
10.	12 April 2022	Estadio Olímpico Félix Sánchez, Santo Domingo, Dominican Republic	Cuba	2–0	6–0	2022 CONCACAF W Championship qualification
11.	12 April 2022	Estadio Olímpico Félix Sánchez, Santo Domingo, Dominican Republic	Cuba	5–0	6–0	2022 CONCACAF W Championship qualification
12.	28 June 2022	Sports Complex Fedefutbol-Plycem, San Rafael, Costa Rica	Costa Rica	1–0	4–2	Friendly
13.	7 July 2022	Estadio BBVA, Guadalupe, Mexico	Mexico	1–0	1–0	2022 CONCACAF W Championship
14.	18 February 2023	North Harbour Stadium, Auckland, New Zealand	Senegal	3–0	4–0	2023 FIFA Women's World Cup qualification
15.	18 February 2023	North Harbour Stadium, Auckland, New Zealand	Senegal	4–0	4–0	2023 FIFA Women's World Cup qualification
16.	26 October 2023	SKNFA Technical Center, Basseterre, Saint Kitts and Nevis	Saint Kitts and Nevis	6–0	11–0	2024 CONCACAF W Gold Cup qualification
