= Hindmarsh Stadium =

Football stadium

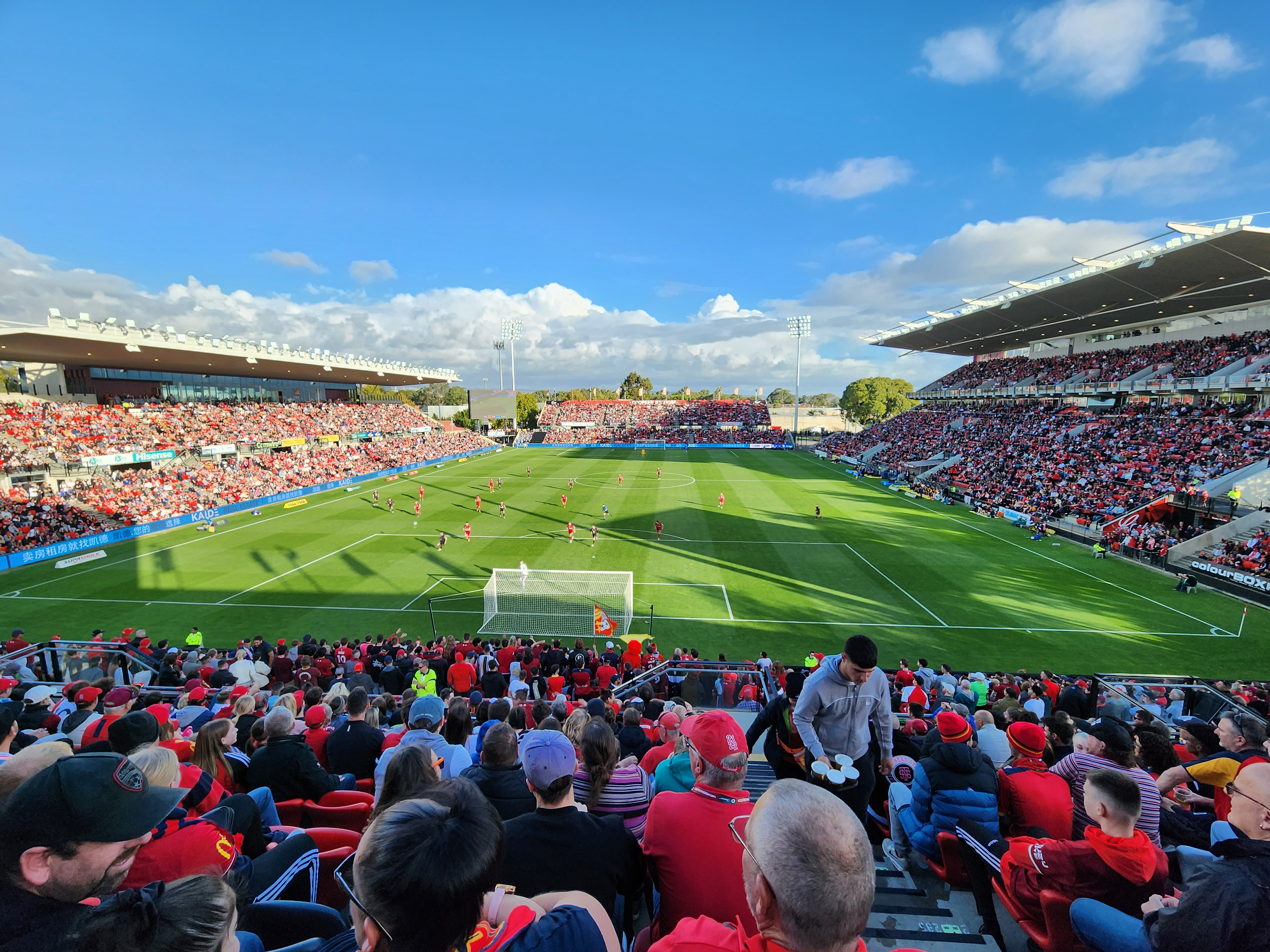
- Hindmarsh Stadium in 2023 from the North end
- Interactive map of Hindmarsh Stadium
- Location: Holden Street, Hindmarsh, South Australia 5007
- Coordinates: 34°54′27″S 138°34′8″E
- Owner: Government of South Australia
- Operator: Adelaide Venue Management Corporation
- Capacity: 16,500
- Record attendance: 18,430 (Italy vs Nigeria, 2000 Olympic Games)
- Field size: 120 x 80 metres
- Public transit: Bowden; Entertainment Centre

Construction
- Built: 1960
- Opened: 1960
- Rebuilt: 1997 renovated February 2000 and 2023

Tenants
- Adelaide United (NSL/A-League) (2003–present); West Torrens Cricket Club (SACA) (1857–1921); West Adelaide (NSL) (1977–1999); Adelaide City (NSL) (1986–2004); Adelaide Rams (NRL) (1998); Adelaide Black Falcons (ESC) (2000–2012); Penrith Panthers (NRL) (2006); Cronulla-Sutherland Sharks (NRL) (2009); 2000 Summer Olympics (Football); 2023 FIFA Women's World Cup

Hindmarsh Stadium (known under naming rights as Coopers Stadium) is a multi-purpose stadium in the Adelaide suburb of Hindmarsh. It is primarily used for soccer as the home ground of Adelaide United FC in the A-League men's and women's competitions.

The stadium has a capacity of 16,500, 15,000 is seated. The stadium opened in its current form in 1960, when it was renovated to be rectangular. Since then it has almost exclusively hosted soccer. Locally based brewery Coopers Brewery has held naming rights to the stadium since 2010.

The stadium hosted five matches during the 2023 FIFA Women's World Cup, as well as Football preliminaries in the 2000 Summer Olympics and matches in the AFC Champions League.

== History ==
Built in 1960, the stadium stands on the site that was once Lindsay Circus/Hindmarsh Oval which housed the Hindmarsh Cricket Club (later West Torrens District Cricket Club) from 1857 - 1921, and West Torrens Football Club of the SANFL from 1905 until 1921. During World War I, the Patriotic Football League, a group of SANFL clubs that wanted to continue playing football during the war, played many games at the venue. The 1916 Patriotic Football League Grand Final was held at the ground between Port Adelaide and West Torrens with Port Adelaide winning 7.11 (53) to 1.13 (19).

The Soccer Association of South Australia owned land on a former brick pit on Torrens Road at Brompton named Rowley Park which was located only 5 km from the city, and the original plan was for the land to be the home of soccer in SA as the site formed a natural bowl. However, the Soccer Association found it difficult to grow grass on the site. Rowley Park also had a tendency to flood during winter as the bottom of the brick pit was below the level of the water table. The land was eventually leased to a group of speedway drivers and became the famous Rowley Park Speedway which ran from December 1949 until it closed in April 1979.

The Soccer Association instead obtained a lease of Hindmarsh Oval from the Hindmarsh Council. The old Hindmarsh Oval was developed over the years into a rectangular stadium capable of holding 15,000, with a single tier grandstand built in 1960 that held approximately 2,000. 6 light towers for night games (plus another 8 smaller light towers on the grandstand roof) were installed during the mid-1970s. Other than the grandstand, the ground was all terracing surrounding the playing surface. This changed in 1996 when seats were installed on the eastern side of the ground.

Along with the Olympic Sports Field, Hindmarsh became one of two Adelaide venues in the former National Soccer League which was launched in 1977. Hindmarsh was the home ground of the Adelaide City Zebras (who also played games at the Sports Field), and later the home ground for West Adelaide Hellas. Hindmarsh would eventually become the sole Adelaide NSL venue during the late 1980s.

In 1986, Hindmarsh Stadium hosted the first leg of the NSL Grand Final between Adelaide City and Sydney Olympic. Olympic won 1–0. Adelaide would go on to win the 2nd leg in Sydney 3–1 and become NSL Champions. Hindmarsh again hosted the NSL Grand Final (this time a single game) in 1994-95 when Adelaide City faced the Mark Viduka led Melbourne Knights. In front of a crowd of over 16,000 the Knights defeated the Zebras 2–0.

As soccer was generally played to smaller crowds during the 1970s and 1980s, Hindmarsh became a regular host of the Socceroos in some of their international matches, with Adelaide-based players such as Robert Zabica, Alex Tobin, and the Vidmar brothers Aurelio and Tony all playing prominent roles.

== Association football since 2000 ==
Hindmarsh Stadium was one of the venues chosen to host preliminary matches for the men's soccer during the 2000 Olympics held in Sydney. This saw the stadium receive almost a complete rebuild which brought it to its present status. The field was lengthened from 110 to 120 metres to be able to also accommodate both rugby league and rugby union which used longer field dimensions (though the minimum field length of a union field including in-goal areas is actually 120 metres so shorter than desirable in-goals are required), the six old light towers were replaced with four television standard ones (one in each corner with lights also on the front edge of the grandstand roof) and the former terracing was now all seated, uncovered stands with only the grandstand built in the mid-1990s remaining in place. During the Olympics, temporary stands were erected in the corners of the stadium to bring capacity up to 20,000. Hosting matches from Groups A and B, the recorded attendance at Hindmarsh was set at 18,340 when Italy drew 1–1 Nigeria on 19 September 2000.

Other soccer played in the stadium in the past include several international matches, including most of the games played in the 2004 OFC Nations Cup - an event where the Socceroos began their qualifying campaign for the 2006 FIFA World Cup. In 2007 the venue hosted the first two rounds of the Olyroos campaign as they qualified for the 2008 Summer Olympics. With the rise in the sports popularity in Australia, Hindmarsh is rarely used these days by the Socceroos other than for training purposes or matches against lower ranked countries such as those from the Pacific islands. International matches now generally take place at larger capacity venues such as Sydney's 84,000 seat Stadium Australia, Brisbane's 52,500 seat Lang Park, or the largest stadium in the Southern Hemisphere, the 100,024 capacity Melbourne Cricket Ground. Though with the redevelopment of the Adelaide Oval to a world class, FIFA compliant 53,583 capacity stadium (50,083 seated), there is renewed speculation that the Socceroos will return to Adelaide for high-profile international matches.

=== Adelaide United ===
Hindmarsh Stadium has been the home ground of A-League Men club Adelaide United since the formation of the club in 2003. The stadium's record attendance outside of the 2000 Olympic Games is 17,000 at the 2008 AFC Champions League Final second leg between Adelaide United and Gamba Osaka of Japan. Adelaide lost 2–0, being the first Australian side to reach the Final of the AFC Champions League.

Since 2013, the stadium has been known has Coopers Stadium, under sponsorship from Adelaide brewery Coopers.

The venue took host to the inaugural FFA Cup Final on 16 December 2014 which saw Adelaide United defeat Perth Glory. It has gone on to have a rich cup football history, with United hosting and winning in 2018 and 2019. United were 1–0 victors with an attendance of 16,142.

== Rugby football ==
Hindmarsh Stadium not only hosted soccer matches but also hosted Rugby union and Rugby league. In 1992 the New Zealand All Blacks played an exhibition game against a South Australian 'Select' team. The All Blacks, including goal kicking Stand-off Grant Fox who would retire the following year as the All Blacks highest ever point scorer, ran out easy winners while FitzSimons, playing up to the crowd by humorously claiming innocence, was sent off midway through the second half after numerous infringements. At the time this made FitzSimons the only Wallaby (although his international career had finished by the time of the match) to ever be sent off in a match against the All Blacks.

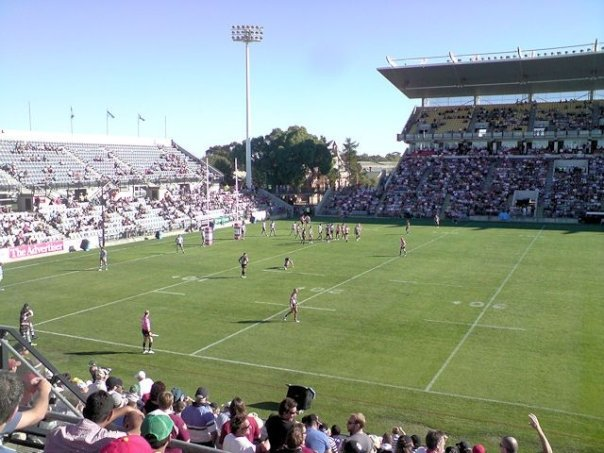
National Rugby League match between the Cronulla-Sutherland Sharks and North Queensland Cowboys at Hindmarsh Stadium on 19 April 2009

In 1998 the short lived National Rugby League team the Adelaide Rams used Hindmarsh for their last 4 home games of the 1998 NRL season. The Rams début at the venue was a success when they thumped the Balmain Tigers 52–0 in front of 7,351 fans. The Rams would end up 2–2 at Hindmarsh after defeating the Auckland Warriors, but losing to Manly-Warringah and North Sydney. The Rams were to continue using Hindmarsh as their home ground in the 1999 NRL season giving them a rectangular venue suited to league rather than an oval as was their previous home, the Adelaide Oval. However the team was wound up by owners News Ltd only weeks before the start of the 1999 season.

On 15 April 2006 on a Saturday night the stadium hosted its first NRL match since the Rams final home game in 1998 when the Sydney-based Penrith Panthers played that year's NRL Grand Finalist the Melbourne Storm. With 7,017 fans in attendance the Storm ran out easy 40–18 winners with emerging rugby league superstar Greg Inglis scoring 3 tries for Melbourne. It was a home match for the Panthers who brought the game to Adelaide due to renovations being completed at their usual home, Penrith Stadium in western Sydney.

On 3 October 2008 it was announced by the SA Government Minister for Recreation and Sport Michael Wright coach Ricky Stuart, head coach of Sydney-based NRL team the Cronulla-Sutherland Sharks, that the Sharks would play three NRL home games at Hindmarsh over 3 years starting from 2009. The first of those was against the North Queensland Cowboys on 19 April 2009. On a sunny autumn day the Cowboys defeated the Sharks 34–10 in front of 8,547 fans, the record crowd for a rugby league match at Hindmarsh.

Unfortunately for NRL fans in Adelaide it was announced early in the 2010 season that Cronulla had been allowed by the SA Government to pull out of their contract. Cronulla's official reasons were wanting to concentrate on their home fans by not taking home games away from Toyota Stadium. The NRL return to Adelaide in 2010 when another Sydney based club Canterbury-Bankstown Bulldogs played a home game at the Adelaide Oval instead of Hindmarsh against the Melbourne Storm. The Bulldogs had planned to make the Adelaide Oval their 'other' home, returning in 2011, again against the Storm, but this was also abandoned after just two years.

=== Rugby league attendances and results ===
Hindmarsh Stadium has hosted six top grade rugby league matches.

Date	Result	Attendance	Notes
3 July 1998	Adelaide Rams def. Balmain Tigers 52–0	7,351	1998 NRL season (round 17)
26 July 1998	Adelaide Rams def. Auckland Warriors 22–20	7,445	1998 NRL season (round 20)
7 August 1998	Manly-Warringah Sea Eagles def. Adelaide Rams 32–10	7,459	1998 NRL season (round 22); Adelaide Rams record Hindmarsh attendance
15 August 1998	North Sydney Bears def. Adelaide Rams 36–0	7,035	1998 NRL season (round 23); Final Adelaide Rams home game
15 April 2006	Melbourne Storm def. Penrith Panthers 40–18	7,017	2006 NRL season (round 6)
19 April 2009	North Queensland Cowboys def. Cronulla-Sutherland Sharks 34–10	8,547	2009 NRL season (round 6); Hindmarsh rugby league attendance record

== Upgrades ==
In 1996 as part of the rebuilding of the venue before the 2000 Summer Olympics, the original single tier grandstand with its wooden bench seats was demolished and replaced by the current two tier structure. The terracing on the opposite wing was also removed and replaced by seating. When the ground was rebuilt before the Olympics only the new grandstand would remain in place.

In 2021 Hindmarsh Stadium began undergoing a $53 million redevelopment which included new stadium lighting, a roof for the eastern grandstand, big screens, improvements to the stadium's change-rooms, upgrades to the media facilities, spectator amenities, and a corporate facility in the Eastern stand. The redevelopment was completed in January 2023, months in advance of the stadium's fixtures for the 2023 FIFA Women's World Cup. The redevelopment contributed towards installation of a new pitch, 15 new screens (2 large video replay screens and 13 digital signage screens across seven bars), and upgraded active supporter areas with safe standing, which were unveiled in October 2024.

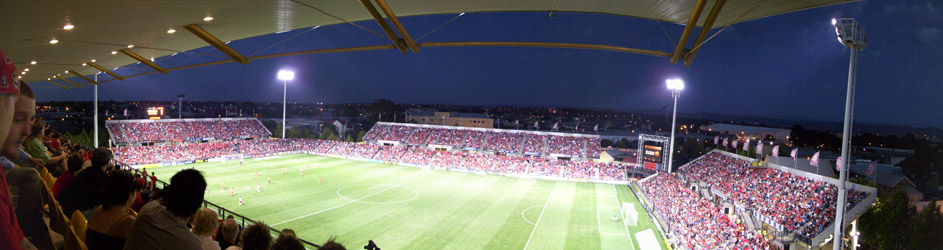
Panorama View of Hindmarsh Stadium, Adelaide United vs Perth Glory in 2009
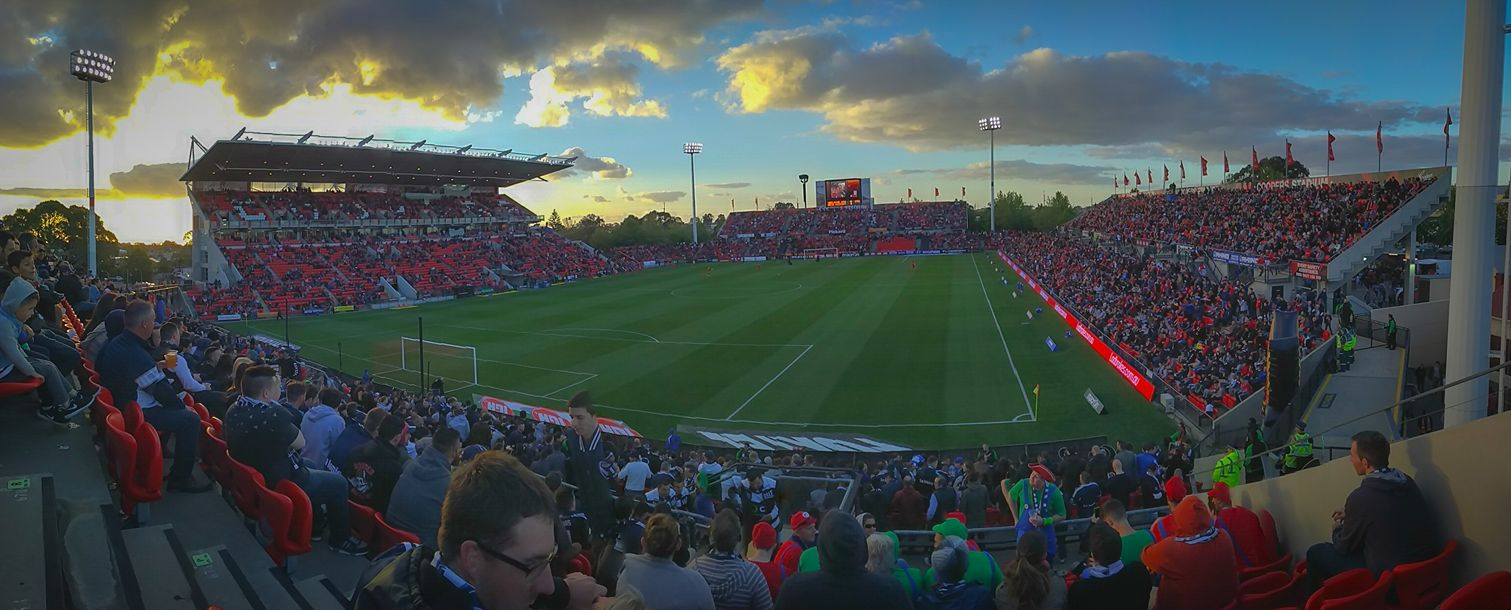
Panorama of Hindmarsh Stadium from the away end before Adelaide United v Melbourne Victory, October 2016

== 2000 Olympic Games football fixtures ==
Hindmarsh Stadium hosted seven games of the 2000 Olympic men's football tournament. The stadium's all-time attendance record of 18,430 was set during the Group A match between Italy and Nigeria.

Date	Time (ACST)	Team #1	Result	Team #2	Round	Attendance
13 September 2000	18:30	Nigeria	3–3	Honduras	Group A	13,386
14 September 2000	18:30	South Korea	0–3	Spain	Group B	14,060
16 September 2000	18:30	Italy	3–1	Honduras	Group A	18,301
17 September 2000	18:30	South Korea	1–0	Morocco	Group B	12,753
19 September 2000	18:30	Italy	1–1	Nigeria	Group A	18,430
20 September 2000	18:30	South Korea	1–0	Chile	Group B	16,309
23 September 2000	18:30	United States	1–1 (5–4 pen.)	Japan	Quarter-finals	18,345

== 2023 FIFA Women's World Cup fixtures ==
The venue hosted 5 matches of the 2023 FIFA Women's World Cup - 4 group games and 1 knockout fixture.

Date	Team #1	Result	Team #2	Round	Attendance
24 July 2023	Brazil	4–0	Panama	Group F	13,142
28 July 2023	China	1–0	Haiti	Group D	12,675
30 July 2023	South Korea	0–1	Morocco	Group H	12,886
1 August 2023	China	1–6	England	Group D	13,497
8 August 2023	France	4–0	Morocco	Round of 16	13,557

== See also ==
- Lists of stadiums
- List of soccer stadiums in Australia

Preceded by Rajamangala Stadium (Thailand) Bangkok	AFC Women's Asian Cup; Final Venue; 2006	Succeeded by Thong Nhat Stadium (Vietnam) Ho Chi Minh City
