= Milan Pierre-Jérôme =

Haitian association football player

Personal information
- Full name: Milan Raquel Pierre-Jérôme
- Date of birth: April 23, 2002 (age 24)
- Place of birth: Fort Lauderdale, Florida
- Height: 1.77 m (5 ft 10 in)
- Positions: Defender; midfielder

Team information
- Current team: George Mason Patriots
- Number: 16

Youth career
- Weston FC

College career
Years	Team	Apps	(Gls)
2020–2021	Maryland Terrapins	15	(0)
2022–	George Mason Patriots	33	(2)

Senior career*
Years	Team	Apps	(Gls)
2021	Sunrise Sting		

International career
2017–2018	Haiti U17	5	(1)
2018	Haiti U20	1	(0)
2022–	Haiti	8	(2)
- * Club domestic league appearances and goals as of 29 June 2024

Milan Raquel Pierre-Jérôme (born 23 April 2002) is a Haitian footballer who plays as a midfielder for the George Mason Patriots, and defender for the Haiti women's national team. She has 9 caps.

She played for University of Maryland. She plays for George Mason University.

She competed at the U17 Caribbean Cup Championship, 2018 FIFA U-20 Women's World Cup. She was called up for the 2023 FIFA Women's World Cup.
