= Dayana Pierre-Louis =

Haitian footballer (born 2003)

- Pierre-Louis with the Utah Royals in 2026

Personal information
- Date of birth: 24 September 2003 (age 23)
- Place of birth: Cap-Haïtien, Haiti
- Height: 1.79 m (5 ft 10 in)
- Position: Midfielder

Team information
- Current team: Utah Royals
- Number: 15

Senior career*
| Years | Team | Apps | (Gls) |
- AS Tigresses
| 2022–2023 | GPSO 92 Issy | 11 | (0) |
| 2023–2025 | Lens | 44 | (4) |
| 2026– | Utah Royals | 11 | (0) |

International career^{‡}
| 2019 | Haiti U-19 | 4 | (0) |
| 2020–2023 | Haiti U-20 | 5 | (4) |
| 2022– | Haiti | 14+ | (1) |
- * Club domestic league appearances and goals as of 04:23, 10 November 2026 (UTC) ‡ National team caps and goals as of 28 October 2025

Dayana Pierre-Louis (born 24 September 2003) is a Haitian professional footballer who plays as a midfielder for the Utah Royals of the National Women's Soccer League (NWSL) and the Haiti national team. She represented Haiti at the 2023 FIFA Women's World Cup.

== Club career ==
In September 2022, Pierre-Louis went overseas and signed with Division 2 Féminine club GPSO 92 Issy. In August 2023, she joined fellow Division 2 club Lens. She helped the club finish second in the 2024–25 season, earning promotion to the Première Ligue.

In January 2026, Pierre-Louis transferred to the NWSL's Utah Royals for an undisclosed fee, signing a three-year contract with the option for another year.

== International career ==
Pierre-Louis made her senior international debut for Haiti on June 25, 2022. She started all three games for Haiti at the 2023 FIFA Women's World Cup.
