= Sherly Jeudy =

Haitian footballer (born 1998)

Personal information
- Date of birth: 13 October 1998 (age 28)
- Place of birth: Léogâne, Haiti
- Height: 1.65 m (5 ft 5 in)
- Position: Forward

Team information
- Current team: Lens
- Number: 9

Senior career*
Years	Team	Apps	(Gls)
2018	Issy	2	(0)
2018	Anacaona SC		
2019	Santiago Morning		
2019	Anacaona SC		
2020–2021	Nantes	7	(2)
2021–2023	Grenoble	32	(10)
2023–	Lens	35	(6)

International career^{‡}
2018	Haiti U20	11	(1)
2015–	Haiti	35	(15)
- * Club domestic league appearances and goals as of 7 May 2025 ‡ National team caps and goals as of 4 June 2025

Sherly Jeudy (born 13 October 1998) is a Haitian professional footballer who plays as a forward for Seconde Ligue club Lens and the Haiti national team.

== International goals ==
Scores and results list Haiti's goal tally first

No.	Date	Venue	Opponent	Score	Result	Competition
1	21 August 2015	Juan Ramón Loubriel Stadium, Bayamón, Puerto Rico	Aruba	2–0	14–0	2016 CONCACAF Women's Olympic Qualifying Championship qualification
2	21 August 2015	Juan Ramón Loubriel Stadium, Bayamón, Puerto Rico	Aruba	3–0	14–0	2016 CONCACAF Women's Olympic Qualifying Championship qualification
3	21 August 2015	Juan Ramón Loubriel Stadium, Bayamón, Puerto Rico	Aruba	6–0	14–0	2016 CONCACAF Women's Olympic Qualifying Championship qualification
4	18 April 2018	Stade Sylvio Cator, Port-au-Prince, Haiti	U.S. Virgin Islands	4–0	7–0	2018 CFU Women's Challenge Series
5	20 April 2018	Stade Sylvio Cator, Port-au-Prince, Haiti	U.S. Virgin Islands	7–0	14–0	2018 CFU Women's Challenge Series
6	20 April 2018	Stade Sylvio Cator, Port-au-Prince, Haiti	U.S. Virgin Islands	14–0	14–0	2018 CFU Women's Challenge Series
7	11 May 2018	Stade Sylvio Cator, Port-au-Prince, Haiti	Guadeloupe	11–0	11–0	2018 CONCACAF Women's Championship qualification
8	13 May 2018	Stade Sylvio Cator, Port-au-Prince, Haiti	Jamaica	2–0	2–2	2018 CONCACAF Women's Championship qualification
9	25 June 2022	Estadio Alejandro Morera Soto, Alajuela, Costa Rica	Costa Rica	1–2	1–2	Friendly
10	17 April 2026	Stade Roger Zami, Le Gosier Guadeloupe	Dominican Republic	1–0	1–1	2026 CONCACAF W Championship qualification
