= Darlina Joseph =

Haitian footballer (born 2003)

Personal information
- Full name: Florsie Love Darlina Joseph
- Date of birth: 15 December 2003 (age 22)
- Place of birth: Pignon, Haiti
- Height: 1.60 m (5 ft 3 in)
- Position: Forward

Team information
- Current team: Marseille
- Number: 29

Senior career*
Years	Team	Apps	(Gls)
2019–2022	Don Bosco		
2023	Grenoble	7	(5)
2023–	Marseille	17	(3)
2025	→ Toulouse (loan)	0	(0)

International career^{‡}
2020–2022	Haiti U20	10	(4)
2022–	Haiti	10	(1)
- * Club domestic league appearances and goals as of 20 October 2024 ‡ National team caps and goals as of 26 May 2024 (UTC)

Florsie-Love Darlina Joseph (born 15 December 2003) is a Haitian professional footballer who plays as a forward for Seconde Ligue club Marseille and the Haiti national team. She has 4 caps.

She competed at the 2022 U-20 Women's World Cup qualification, and 2023 FIFA Women's World Cup.

She played for Don Bosco FC.

== International goals ==
No.	Date	Venue	Opponent	Score	Result	Competition
1.	26 October 2023	SKNFA Technical Center, Basseterre, Saint Kitts and Nevis	Saint Kitts and Nevis	11–0	11–0	2024 CONCACAF W Gold Cup qualification
