= Lars Søndergaard =

Danish footballer and manager (born 1959)

Personal information
- Full name: Lars Søndergaard
- Date of birth: 5 April 1959 (age 67)
- Place of birth: Aalborg, Denmark
- Height: 1.85 m (6 ft 1 in)

Senior career*
Years	Team	Apps	(Gls)
	AaB	40	

Managerial career
- 1996–1997: AaB (youth)
- 1997: AaB
- 1998–2000: AaB (assistant)
- 2000–2001: Austria Salzburg (assistant)
- 2001–2003: Austria Salzburg
- 2004–2005: Austria Wien
- 2006–2007: Grazer AK
- 2007: FC Wacker Innsbruck
- 2008–2009: Red Bull Salzburg youth
- 2009–2010: Viborg
- 2011–2015: SønderjyskE
- 2015–2016: AaB
- 2017–2023: Denmark women
- * Club domestic league appearances and goals

Lars Søndergaard (born 5 April 1959) is a Danish professional football manager and former player who last worked as manager of the Denmark women's national team.

On 18 December 2017, it was announced by the Danish Football Association (DBU) that Lars Søndergaard was the new manager of the Denmark women's national team. He signed a contract which would last until the end of UEFA Women's Euro 2021. On 10 October 2020, the DBU announced that Søndergaard had signed a new contract which would last until a potential qualification for the 2023 FIFA Women's World Cup. After qualifying for the 2023 FIFA Women's World Cup and guiding his team to the round of sixteen, Lars announced he would step down as coach.
