= Ruthny Mathurin =

Haitian footballer (born 2001)

Personal information
- Date of birth: 14 January 2001 (age 25)
- Place of birth: Port-au-Prince, Haiti
- Height: 1.73 m (5 ft 8 in)
- Positions: Defender; midfielder

Team information
- Current team: Alhama CF ElPozo
- Number: 15

College career
Years	Team	Apps	(Gls)
2021–2022	Louisiana Ragin' Cajuns	34	(7)
2023–2025	Mississippi State Bulldogs	41	(0)

Senior career*
Years	Team	Apps	(Gls)
2019–2021	AS Tigresses		

International career^{‡}
2016	Haiti U15		
2017–2018	Haiti U17	7	(0)
2018–2020	Haiti U20	19	(1)
2019–	Haiti	6	(0)
- * Club domestic league appearances and goals ‡ National team caps and goals as of 28 June 2022

Ruthny Mathurin (born 14 January 2001) is a Haitian footballer who plays as a defender or midfielder for the Mississippi State Bulldogs in the NCAA Division I and for the Haiti women's national team. Currently playing in Spain.

== Early life ==
Born in Port-au-Prince, Haiti, Mathurin is one of three siblings born to her parents, Denise and Hector. She grew up in Gressier, a commune located just west of Port-au-Prince. At the under-12 level, she was identified and moved to the Camp Nous, the training center of the Haitian Football Federation.

== International career ==
Mathurin first represented Haiti at the 2016 CONCACAF Girls' U-15 Championship. She then stepped up to the under-17 level, at which she played at the 2018 CONCACAF Women's U-17 Championship.

Mathurin made her senior debut for Haiti during 2020 CONCACAF Women's Olympic Qualifying Championship qualification. On 3 October 2019, in the Group C opener against Suriname, she started in a 10–0 victory.

== Career statistics ==
As of 28 June 2022

Appearances and goals by national team and year
National team	Year	Apps	Goals
Haiti	2019	2	0
Haiti	2020	2	0
Haiti	2021	0	0
Haiti	2022	2	0
Total		6	0
