= Chelsea Surpris =

Haitian footballer (born 1996)

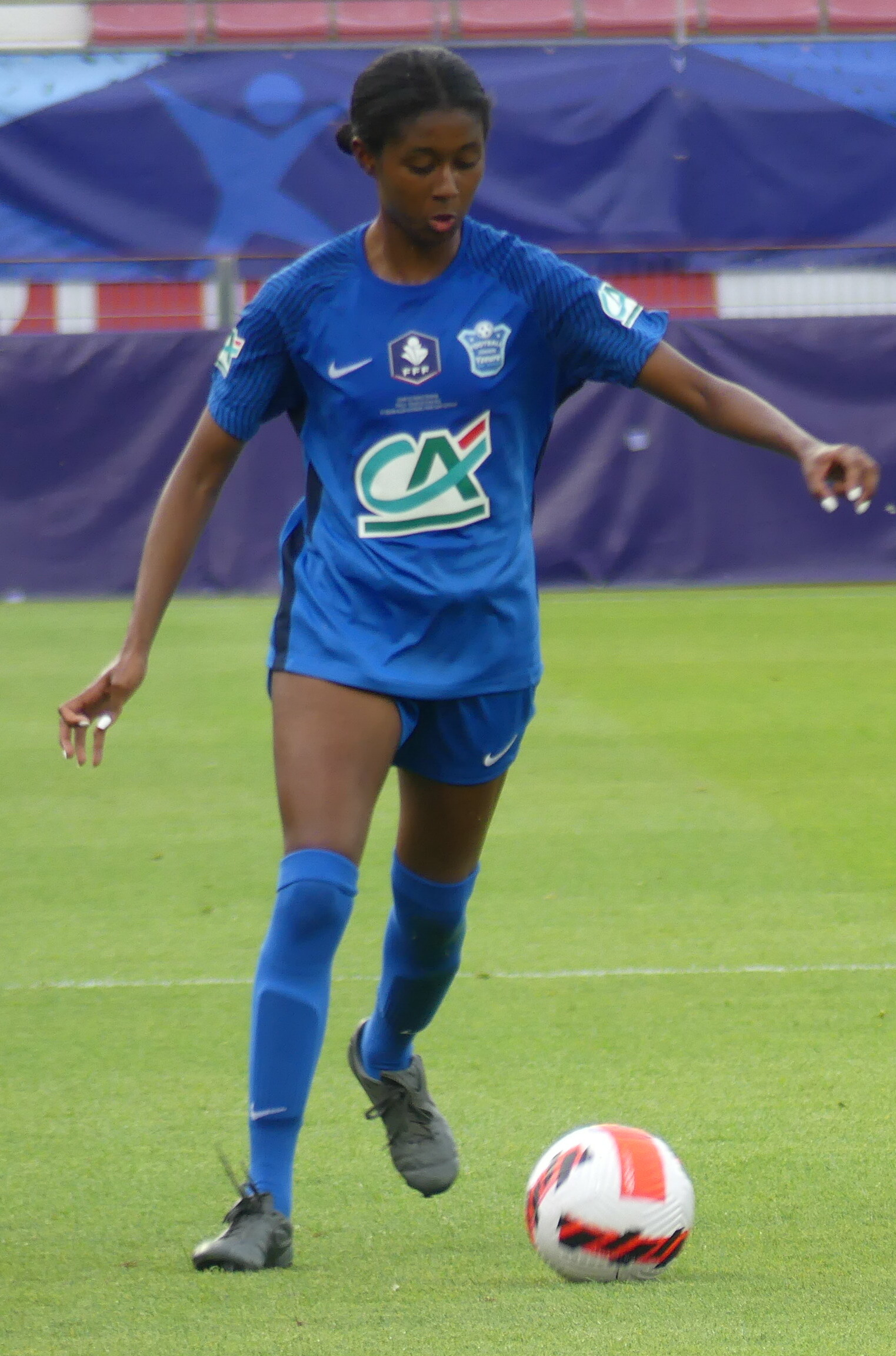
- Surpris with Yzeure Allier in 2022

Personal information
- Full name: Chelsea Ariane Surpris
- Date of birth: 20 December 1996 (age 29)
- Place of birth: Crowley, Texas, U.S.
- Height: 1.70 m (5 ft 7 in)
- Positions: Right back; left back; center back

Team information
- Current team: SC Sand
- Number: 3

Youth career
- Dallas Sting
- Nolan Catholic Vikings

College career
Years	Team	Apps	(Gls)
2015–2018	Texas Longhorns	60	(2)

Senior career*
Years	Team	Apps	(Gls)
2019	FC Dallas	7	(0)
2020–2021	ASJ Soyaux	4	(0)
2021–2022	Yzeure Allier	20	(0)
2022–2023	Grenoble	17	(4)
2024–2025	Apollon Ladies	6	(0)
2025–	SC Sand	16	(0)

International career^{‡}
- United States U20
2020–	Haiti	12	(2)

Managerial career
- 2019–2020: Louisiana Ragin' Cajuns (assistant)
- * Club domestic league appearances and goals as of 22 November 2026 ‡ National team caps and goals as of 02:51, 29 January 2020 (UTC)

Chelsea Ariane Surpris (born 20 December 1996) is a professional footballer who currently plays as a defender for 2. Frauen-Bundesliga club SC Sand. Internationally, she plays for the Haiti national team, despite previously representing the United States on their under-18 and under-20 national teams. She also worked as an assistant coach for the Louisiana Ragin' Cajuns in 2019.

== Early life and education ==
Chelsea Ariane Surpris was born on 20 December 1996 in Crowley, Texas to Haitian parents Arly and Pascale Surpris. She began playing soccer at age 6, after being inspired by watching her older brother Dylan play. Surpris attended Nolan Catholic High School, and played on their soccer team, the Nolan Catholic Vikings. In 2012, she was named the team's most valuable player. In addition to soccer, Surpris competed in track and field at the school and served on the student council. Surpris played for the Dallas Sting club team in her youth, helping the team to win the 2011 USYSA and 2014 ECNL national championships.

After high school, Surpris attended the University of Texas at Austin, where she played on the college's Texas Longhorns team from 2015 to 2018. In total, she made 60 appearances, scoring 2 goals and recording 2 assists. In 2019, she graduated with a Bachelor of Arts degree in Human Dimensions of Organization and a minor in business.

== Club career ==
Surpris played for the Chicago Stars FC during their 2019 preseason. In May and June of the same year, played for the senior Dallas Sting team in the WPSL.

In June 2020, she signed for the French Division 2 Féminine club Montauban FCTG. Although she never played for them before signing for the Division 1 Féminine club ASJ Soyaux-Charente later that year. She remained with the club for another year before joining Yzeure Allier as a free agent in 2021. During her time with the club, she played in the 2022 Coupe de France final against Paris Saint-Germain, however Yzeure Allier lost 0–8.

Surpris signed for Grenoble Foot 38 in September 2022. In March 2024, she joined Apollon Ladies F.C., before transferring a year later to the 2. Frauen-Bundesliga club SC Sand.

== International career ==
Although born in the United States, Surpris plays on the Haiti women's national team. She had previously appeared on the under-18 and United States under-20 national teams. Surpris made her international debut for Haiti in a match in the 2020 CONCACAF Women's Olympic Qualifying Championship against the United States on 28 January 2020, which Haiti lost 0–3. She also played in the 2022 CONCACAF W Championship held in Mexico.

== Coaching career ==
Surpris was appointed as an assistant coach for the Louisiana Ragin' Cajuns women's team on 24 October 2019.
