= Tabita Joseph =

Haitian footballer (born 2003)

Personal information
- Full name: Dougenie Tabita Kerbie Joseph
- Date of birth: 13 September 2003 (age 23)
- Place of birth: Plain of the Cul-de-Sac, Haiti
- Height: 1.70 m (5 ft 7 in)
- Position: Defender

Team information
- Current team: Marseille
- Number: 4

Senior career*
| Years | Team | Apps | (Gls) |
| 2018–2021 | AS Tigresses | | |
| 2021–2023 | Brest | 31 | (2) |
| 2023– | Marseille | 11 | (0) |

International career^{‡}
| 2017–2018 | Haiti U17 | 7 | (0) |
| 2019 | Haiti U19 | 5 | (0) |
| 2018–2020 | Haiti U20 | 12 | (0) |
| 2022– | Haiti | 6 | (0) |
- * Club domestic league appearances and goals as of 20 October 2024 ‡ National team caps and goals as of 27 July 2023

Dougenie Tabita Kerbie Joseph (born 13 September 2003) is a Haitian professional footballer who plays as a defender for Seconde Ligue club Marseille and the Haiti national team.

== International career ==
Joseph made a senior appearance for Haiti on 3 October 2019.

== Honours ==
Tigresses

- Championnat d'Haiti: 2018
