= Roseline Éloissaint =

Haitian footballer (born 1999)

Personal information
- Date of birth: 20 February 1999 (age 27)
- Place of birth: Paillant, Haiti
- Height: 1.61 m (5 ft 3 in)
- Position: Winger

Team information
- Current team: Nantes
- Number: 11

College career
Years	Team	Apps	(Gls)
2019	UQAM Citadins		

Senior career*
Years	Team	Apps	(Gls)
–2018	AS Tigresses		
2019	Blainville	15	(11)
2020–2023	Nantes	46	(7)
2023–2024	Strasbourg	1	(1)
2024-	Nantes	17	(1)

International career^{‡}
2018	Haiti U20	10	(2)
2018–	Haiti	11	(6)
- * Club domestic league appearances and goals as of 8 October 2025 ‡ National team caps and goals as of 30 July 2023 (UTC)

Roseline Éloissaint (born 20 February 1999) is a Haitian footballer who plays as a winger for Première Ligue club Nantes and the Haiti national team.

== International goals ==
Scores and results list Haiti's goal tally first

No.	Date	Venue	Opponent	Score	Result	Competition
1	18 April 2018	Stade Sylvio Cator, Port-au-Prince, Haiti	U.S. Virgin Islands	7–0	7–0	2018 CFU Women's Challenge Series
2	20 April 2018	Stade Sylvio Cator, Port-au-Prince, Haiti	U.S. Virgin Islands	4–0	14–0	2018 CFU Women's Challenge Series
3	11 May 2018	Stade Sylvio Cator, Port-au-Prince, Haiti	Guadeloupe	1–0	11–0	2018 CONCACAF Women's Championship qualification
4	11 May 2018	Stade Sylvio Cator, Port-au-Prince, Haiti	Guadeloupe	2–0	11–0	2018 CONCACAF Women's Championship qualification
5	11 May 2018	Stade Sylvio Cator, Port-au-Prince, Haiti	Guadeloupe	3–0	11–0	2018 CONCACAF Women's Championship qualification
6	11 April 2023	Marden Sports Complex, Alanya, Turkey	Moldova	1–0	3–1	Friendly
7	30 November 2025	FFB Stadium, Belmopan, Belize	Belize	5–0	9–0	2026 CONCACAF W Championship qualification
8	3 March 2026	Dr. Ir. Franklin Essed Stadion, Paramaribo, Suriname	Suriname	1–0	2–0	2026 CONCACAF W Championship qualification
