= Betina Petit-Frère =

Haitian footballer (born 2003)

Personal information
- Date of birth: 1 August 2003 (age 23)
- Place of birth: Port-au-Prince, Haiti
- Height: 1.60 m (5 ft 3 in)
- Position: Defender

Team information
- Current team: Amed
- Number: 7

Senior career*
Years	Team	Apps	(Gls)
–2021	Exafoot		
2021–2023	Brest	31	(0)
2023–2024	Grenoble	5	(0)
2024–	Brest	5	(0)
2026–	Amed	9	(0)

International career
2017–2018	Haiti U17	7	(0)
2018–2020	Haiti U20	9	(0)
2022–	Haiti	10	(0)
- * Club domestic league appearances and goals as of 14 November 2026

Betina Petit-Frère (born 1 August 2003) is a Haitian footballer who plays as a defender for Turkish Women's Super League club Amed, and the Haiti national team. She has 8 caps.

== Club career ==
Petit-Frère is a right-back. She played in her country for Exafoot, with which she won the Haitian women’s football championship during the 2020–21 season.

In November 2021, she went to France, and started a week-long trial with the Première Ligue club Girondins de Bordeaux that proved unsuccessful. She was spotted by another French club Brest, which signed her in December 2021. After the 2022–23 season with Brest, she transferred to Grenoble. In August 2024, she returned to her previous club Brest.

She moved to Turkey in September 2026, and signed with the Diyarbakur-based club Amed to play in the Women's Super League.

== International career ==
Petit-Frère was selected to the Haiti national team in June 2023, and played at the 2023 FIFA Women's World Cup.

== Honours ==
Haitian Women's Football Championship

Exafoot
Champions (1): 2020–21
