= Nicolas Delépine =

French football manager

Personal information
- Full name: Nicolas Michel Gregory Delépine
- Date of birth: 4 May 1979 (age 47)
- Place of birth: Angers

Team information
- Current team: Grenoble (women's manager)

Managerial career
- Years: Team
- Nantes (women)
- Montpellier (women)
- Guingamp (women)
- 2020–: Grenoble (women)
- 2022–2023: Haiti (women)

Nicolas Michel Gregory Delépine (born 4 May 1979) is a French football manager who manages Haiti.

== Career ==
In 2022, Delépine was appointed manager of Haiti. He led Haiti qualify for the 2023 FIFA Women's World Cup, their first World Cup. Previously, he had managed French side Grenoble.
