= Maudeline Moryl =

Haitian footballer (born 2003)

Personal information
- Date of birth: 24 January 2003 (age 23)
- Place of birth: Cap-Haïtien, Haiti
- Height: 1.60 m (5 ft 3 in)
- Position: Midfielder

Team information
- Current team: Marseille
- Number: 5

Senior career*
Years	Team	Apps	(Gls)
- ASF Croix-des-Bouquet
2023–2024	Grenoble	31	(5)
2024–	Marseille	4	(0)

International career^{‡}
2019	Haiti U19	5	(0)
2020–	Haiti	1+	
- * Club domestic league appearances and goals as of 20 October 2024 ‡ National team caps and goals as of 00:56, 4 February 2020 (UTC)

Maudeline Moryl (born 24 January 2003) is a Haitian professional footballer who plays as a midfielder for Première Ligue club Marseille and the Haiti national team.

== International career ==
Moryl has appeared for the Haiti women's national team, including in the 2020 CONCACAF Women's Olympic Qualifying Championship on 3 February 2020 against Panama. She came on as a substitute in the 82nd minute for Danielle Étienne, with the match finishing as a 6–0 win.
