= Paris SO Cœur =

French women's football club based in Issy-les-Moulineaux

Paris SO
- Full name: Paris SO Cœur
- Nickname: Les Chouettes d'Issy (Issy's Owls)
- Founded: 1997; 28 years ago (as EuroPeru); 2001; 24 years ago (as FF Issy); 2020; 5 years ago (as GPSO 92 Issy)
- Ground: Cité des Sports Issy Les Moulineaux
- President: David Valcke
- Website: https://www.gpso92issy.com/

Paris SO Cœur, formerly known as FF Issy and GPSO 92 Issy, is a French women's football based in Issy-les-Moulineaux, founded in 1997 as EuroPeru (French: EuroPérou). The club currently competes in Ligue de Paris-Île-de-France de football Régional 1 Féminine, the fourth-tier of women's football in France.

== History ==
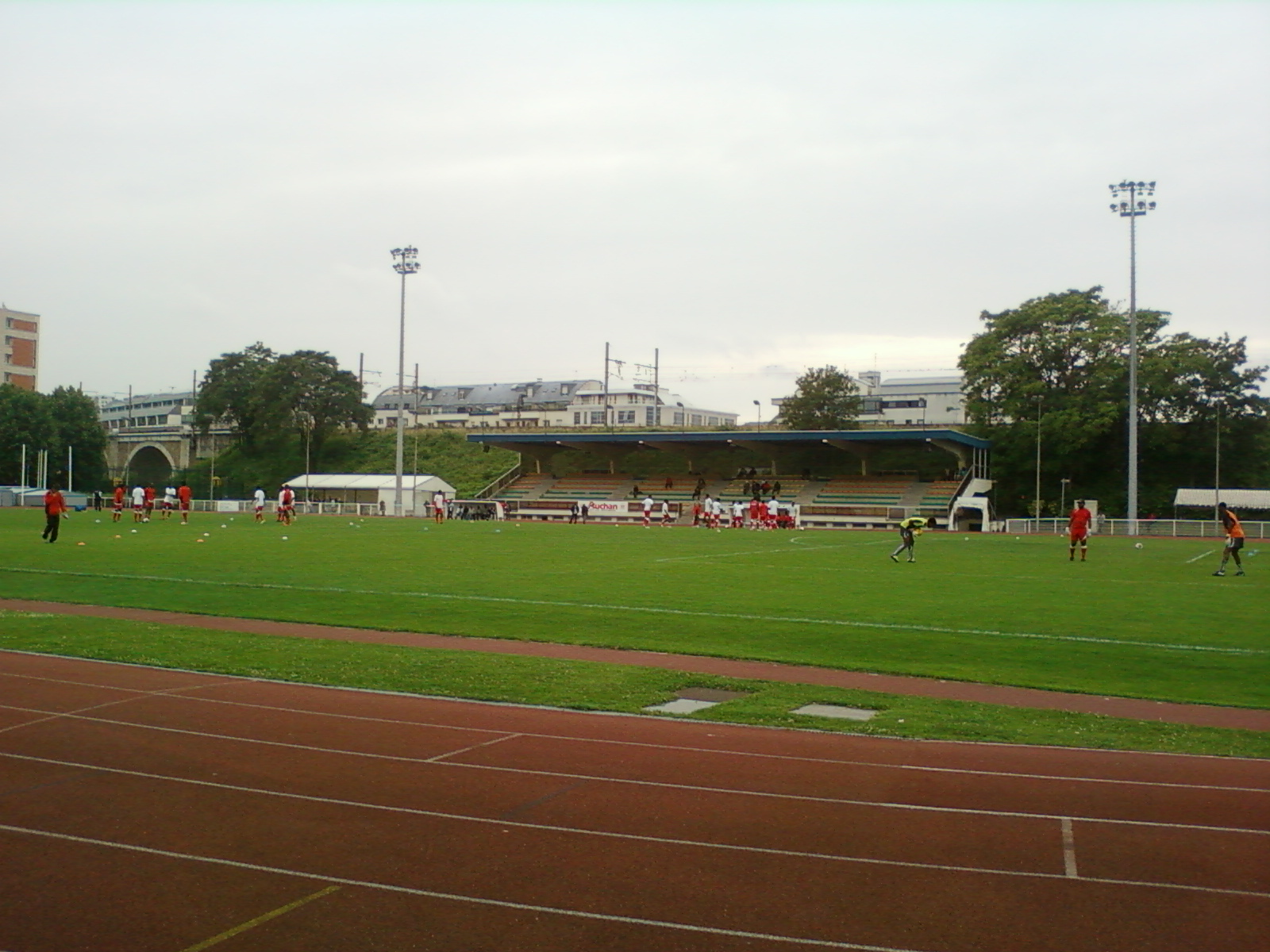
Stade Jean Bouin was the team's original stadium.

GPSO 92 Issy were founded in 1997 by three Peruvian sisters, Edith, Merylin and Mercedes Bohorquez, under the name EuroPeru. The team initially consisted of 20 players from the local Peruvian community, and they played at the Stade Jean-Bouin in Issy-les-Moulineaux. The team began playing in the French league system in November 1999. In 2001, the club was renamed Foot Féminin d'Issy (FF Issy), after being taken over by Corinne Mesas. In 2012, former FF Issy manager Christine Aubère took over the club. GPSO 92 Issy is one of the only French clubs to be run exclusively for women, rather than being affiliated with a men's team. In the 2020–21 season, GPSO 92 Issy and Soyaux were the only exclusively female top division teams, and GPSO 92 Issy has over 250 members.

In 2001, FF Issy played in Promotion de Ligue, the lowest division of the French regional football league. FF Issy achieved three successive promotions to reach the top division (Honorary Division) of the regional Paris-Île-de-France League for the 2003–2004 season. FF Issy missed promotion by finishing second in the next two consecutive seasons, before later achieving promotion to Division 2 Féminine for the 2009–2010 season. FF Issy were promoted to Division 1 Féminine for the 2012–13 season. They also played in the 2014–15 Division 1 Féminine. In 2018, there were suggestions of the club merging with men's Championnat National team Red Star, though the plans were later abandoned.

FF Issy were winning League A of the 2019–2020 Division 2 Féminine by 12 points when the league was suspended due to the COVID-19 pandemic. In April 2020, the French Football Federation (FFF) confirmed that Issy would be promoted to Division 1 Féminine for the 2020–21 season. In 2020, the team was renamed from FF Issy to Grand Paris Seine Ouest 92 Issy (GPSO 92 Issy). The new name reflects the fact the team is based in Hauts-de-Seine, which is French department number 92. Issy were initially relegated from Division 1 Féminine the next season. In July 2021, the FFF reprieved Issy, meaning that they would compete in the 2021–22 Division 1 Féminine. The decision was due to the knock-on effect of the COVID-19 pandemic on the French league systems. They finished 11th in the league, and were relegated to Division 2 Féminine for the 2022–2023 season. In July 2022, Issy appointed 23-year old Erwann Bouchard as their new manager. He was the youngest manager in the French football leagues at the time.

== First-team squad ==
As of 18 October 2025

Note: Flags indicate national team as defined under FIFA eligibility rules; some limited exceptions apply. Players may hold more than one non-FIFA nationality.

No.	Pos.	Nation	Player
8	MF	FRA	Anne-Caroline Piquet
—	DF	FRA	Lilou Suze
—	DF	FRA	Manon Delorme
—	MF	FRA	Chloé Pereira
—	DF	FRA	Alexia Nowak
—	DF	FRA	Ikram Allouchi
—	MF	FRA	Olivia Castillo
—	DF	FRA	Énola Michon
—	MF	CMR	Anne Moukoko Ebelle
—	FW	FRA	Mélissa Sorel

No.	Pos.	Nation	Player
—		FRA	Manon Lagrange
—	MF	TUN	Assia Zouaghi
—	DF	FRA	Laëtitia Agodor Ebongue
—		FRA	Marylou Levasseur
—	DF	FRA	Emma Broches
—		MAR	Inès Ziat
—		FRA	Oumou Dembélé
—		FRA	Mathilde Lebeau
—		FRA	Lucie Champion
—		FRA	Axelle Alash

== Reserve and youth teams ==
GPSO 92 Issy Reserves play in the Regional 1 division of the Paris-Île-de-France League. The GPSO 92 Issy under-19s team play in the Challenge National.
