= Haiti women's national football team =

Women's national association football team representing Haiti

Haiti
- Nickname(s): Les Grenadières; Le Rouge et Bleu; Les Bicolores; La Sélection Nationale
- Association: Fédération Haïtienne de Football (FHF)
- Confederation: CONCACAF (North America)
- Sub-confederation: CFU (Caribbean)
- Head coach: Pia Sundhage
- Captain: Nérilia Mondésir
- Most caps: Nérilia Mondésir (37)
- Top scorer: Melchie Dumornay (40)
- Home stadium: Stade Sylvio Cator
- FIFA code: HAI
First colours	Second colours	Third colours

FIFA ranking
- Current: 47 ▲2 (16 June 2026)
- Highest: 49 (August 2025)
- Lowest: 73 (December 2018; July – September 2019)

First international
- Haiti 1–0 Jamaica (Port-au-Prince, Haiti; 17 April 1991)

Biggest win
- British Virgin Islands 0–21 Haiti (Road Town, British Virgin Islands; 9 April 2022)

Biggest defeat
- Canada 11–1 Haiti (Victoria, British Columbia, Canada; 30 October 2002)

World Cup
- Appearances: 1 (first in 2023)
- Best result: Group stage (2023)

CONCACAF W Championship
- Appearances: 5 (first in 1991)
- Best result: Fourth place (1991)

The Haiti women's national football team (Haitian Creole: ekip foutbòl feminen Ayiti, French: équipe d'Haïti féminine de football) participates in several competitions including the CONCACAF W Championship. The team also participates in qualification for the FIFA Women's World Cup and Summer Olympics, and qualified for their first World Cup at the 2023 edition. The team is controlled by the Fédération Haïtienne de Football. They are one of the top women's national football teams in the Caribbean region along with Jamaica and Trinidad & Tobago. The team is currently coached by Pia Sundhage.

== Home stadium ==
The Haiti women's national team play their home matches on the Stade Sylvio Cator.

== Results and fixtures ==
The following is a list of match results in the last 12 months, as well as any future matches that have been scheduled.

Win Draw Lose Fixture

=== 2025 ===
28 October Friendly	Morocco	3-0	Haiti	Casablanca, Morocco
19:30 UTC+1	Saoud 18'; Chebbak 50'; Jraïdi 70'	Report		Stadium: Stade Pere Jego

30 November 2026 CONCACAF W Championship Q	Belize	0–9	Haiti	Belmopan, Belize
19:00 UTC−6		Report (FIFA); Report (CONCACAF)	Mondésir 12', 18', 32', 63'; Louis 13', 50'; Éloissaint 43'; Dumornay 78' (pen.), 87'	Stadium: FFB Stadium; Referee: Karen Hernández Andrade (Mexico)

=== 2026 ===
3 March 2026 CONCACAF W Championship Q	Belize	0–9	Haiti	Belmopan, Belize
19:00 UTC−3		Report (FIFA); Report (CONCACAF)	Mondésir 12', 18', 32', 63'; Louis 13', 50'; Éloissaint 43'; Dumornay 78' (pen.), 87'	Stadium: FFB Stadium; Referee: Karen Hernández Andrade (Mexico)

9 April 2026 CONCACAF W Championship Q	Suriname	0–2	Haiti	Paramaribo, Suriname
20:00 UTC−4		Report (FIFA); Report (CONCACAF)	Éloissaint 68'; Dumornay 89' (pen.)	Stadium: Dr. Ir. Franklin Essed Stadion; Referee: Kenisha Prescott (Guyana)

9 April 2026 CONCACAF W Championship Q	Haiti	5–0	Anguilla	Le Gosier, Guadeloupe
20:00 UTC−4	Joseph 15', 60'; Domond 21'; Jeudy 33'; Constant 79'	Report (FIFA); Report (CONCACAF)		Stadium: Stade Roger Zami; Referee: Crystal Sobers (Trinidad and Tobago)

17 April 2026 CONCACAF W Championship Q	Haiti	1–1	Dominican Republic	Le Gosier, Guadeloupe
19:00 UTC−6	Jeudy 57'	Report (FIFA)	Tapia 73'	Stadium: Stade Roger Zami; Referee: Lizzet García Olvera (Mexico)

5 June Friendly	New Zealand	1–2	Haiti	Málaga, Spain
18:00 UTC+2	Bunge 41'	Report	Mondesir 45+3'; Étienne 47'	Stadium: Nuevo Estadio El Maulí

8 June Friendly	Equatorial Guinea	1–3	Haiti	Malaga, Spain
18:00 UTC+1	Nñegue 85'	Report	Dumornay 19', 55'; Étienne 30'

9 October Friendly	Haiti	1–5	Japan	Saint-Ouen-sur-Seine, France
20:00 UTC+1	B. Louis 45+3'	Source	Seike 26'; Hamano 33'; Hasegawa 38'; Chiba 57'; Hijikata 81'	Stadium: Stade Bauer

13 October Friendly	Haiti	1–7	Australia	Chambly, France
21:00 UTC+1	Dumornay 3'	Report	McKenna 2', 44'; K. Louis 53' (o.g.); Foord 65'; Galic 72'; Wheeler 79'; McNamara 89'	Stadium: Stade Walter-Luzi; Referee: Jelena Medjedovic (Serbia)

28 November 2026 CONCACAF W Championship	Mexico	v	Haiti	Mansfield, United States
15:30 UTC−6				Stadium: Texas Health Mansfield Stadium

- Haiti Results and Fixtures – Soccerway.com

== Coaching staff ==
=== Current coaching staff ===
As of 23 February 2025:

Position	Name	Ref.
Head coach	Pia Sundhage	

=== Manager history ===
- Pia Sundhage (2026–present)
- Malou Quignette (2024–2025)
- Frédéric Gonçalves (2023–2024)
- Nicolas Delépine (2022–2023)
- Laurent Mortel (2019–2020)
- Stephan De Four (2018–2019)
- Shek Borkowski (2012–2017)

== Players ==
=== Current squad ===
The following players were called up for the international friendly matches against Japan and Australia on 9 and 13 October 2026, respectively.

Caps and goals are not updated for this match.

No.	Pos.	Player	Date of birth (age)	Caps	Goals	Club
1	GK	Naïla Louissaint	2 June 2005 (age 21)			(Canadian Soccer Association) Concordia Stingers
23	GK	Nelly Maignan	20 August 2005 (age 21)			(French Football Federation) AAS Sarcelles
2	DF	Chelsea Surpris	20 December 1996 (age 29)	13	2	(German Football Association) SC Sand
3	DF	Jennyfer Limage	25 December 1997 (age 28)			(French Football Federation) RC Lens
4	DF	Tabita Joseph	13 September 2003 (age 23)			(French Football Federation) Bourges FC
13	DF	Danique Ypema	20 November 1999 (age 26)			(Royal Dutch Football Association) Hera United
14	DF	Amandine Pierre-Louis	18 February 1995 (age 31)			(Canadian Soccer Association) Montreal Roses
16	DF	Claire Constant	13 October 1999 (age 27)			(United States Soccer Federation) DC Power
20	DF	Kethna Louis	5 August 1996 (age 30)			(French Football Federation) FC Fleury 91
22	DF	Nya Jean-Baptiste	6 July 2009 (age 17)			(United States Soccer Federation) Concorde Fire
24	DF	Jasmine Vilgrain	25 July 2002 (age 24)			(Canadian Soccer Association) AFC Toronto
6	MF	Melchie Dumornay	17 August 2003 (age 23)			(French Football Federation) OL Lyonnes
9	MF	Sherly Jeudy	13 October 1998 (age 28)			(French Football Federation) OGC Nice
21	MF	Anyssa Ibrahim	8 February 1999 (age 27)			(French Football Federation) Le Mans FC
25	MF	Maudeline Moryl	24 January 2003 (age 23)			(French Football Federation) Les Marseillaises
5	FW	Laurie-Ann Moïse	4 January 2001 (age 25)			(Turkish Football Federation) Kayseri FK
7	FW	Batcheba Louis	15 June 1997 (age 29)			(French Football Federation) FC Fleury 91
8	FW	Brittany Raphino	28 October 2000 (age 26)			(Italian Football Federation) Inter Milan
10	FW	Nérilia Mondésir	17 January 1999 (age 27)			(United States Soccer Federation) Seattle Reign
11	FW	Roseline Éloissaint	20 February 1999 (age 27)			(French Football Federation) RC Lens
12	FW	Audrey François	1 January 2004 (age 22)			(Canadian Soccer Association) Vancouver Rise
15	FW	Darlina Joseph	15 December 2003 (age 22)			(French Football Federation) AS Cannes
17	FW	Chelsea Domond	19 December 1999 (age 26)			(Hellenic Football Federation) Panathinaikos
18	MF	Joséphine Vanuxeem	12 August 2004 (age 22)			(French Football Federation) Lille OSC
19	FW	Lourdjina Étienne	14 July 2007 (age 19)			(French Football Federation) Bourges FC

=== Recent call ups ===
- The following players have been called up to a Haiti squad in the past 12 months.

Pos.	Player	Date of birth (age)	Caps	Goals	Club	Latest call-up
GK	Kaïna Cesar Pietrus	4 September 2005 (age 21)			(United States) UCF Knights	v. Equatorial Guinea, 8 June 2026
GK	Océane Toussaint	20 February 2004 (age 22)			(France) Paris Saint-Germain	v. Equatorial Guinea, 8 June 2026
GK	Mahe Lee Caron	1 March 2007 (age 19)			(United States) Western Illinois Leathernecks	v. Suriname, 3 March 2026
GK	Elieka Gabriel	28 November 2001 (age 24)			(Haiti) Haïtanna	v. Belize, 30 November 2025
DF	Betina Petit-Frère	1 August 2003 (age 23)			(France) EA Guingamp	v. Equatorial Guinea, 8 June 2026
DF	Alyssa Manassé	29 January 2010 (age 16)			(United States) Rutgers Scarlet Knights	v. Equatorial Guinea, 8 June 2026
DF	Cassandra Decombe	28 June 2004 (age 22)			(Canada) FC Laval	v. Equatorial Guinea, 8 June 2026
DF	Milan Pierre-Jérôme	23 April 2002 (age 24)			(Hungary) Diósgyőri VTK	v. Equatorial Guinea, 8 June 2026
DF	Chloé Joseph	4 April 2003 (age 23)			(United States) Syracuse Orange	v. Suriname, 3 March 2026
DF	Roxanne Vilain	24 February 2002 (age 24)			(France) Le Mans FC	v. Belize, 30 November 2025
MF	Dayana Pierre-Louis	24 September 2003 (age 23)			(United States) Utah Royals	v. Equatorial Guinea, 8 June 2026
MF	Deborah Bien-Aimé	16 September 2003 (age 23)			(France) AS Saint-Étienne	v. Equatorial Guinea, 8 June 2026
MF	Amélie Joseph	18 June 2005 (age 21)			(France) FC Metz	v. Equatorial Guinea, 8 June 2026
MF	Noah Ganthier	13 October 2002 (age 24)			(United States) Colorado State Rams	v. Morocco, 28 October 2025
FW	Keisha Gué				(United States) Las Vegas Heat Surf	v. Equatorial Guinea, 8 June 2026
FW	Nadia Cassamajor	8 October 2005 (age 21)			(United States) Colorado College Tigers	v. Suriname, 3 March 2026
FW	Roselord Borgella	1 April 1993 (age 33)			(Mexico) Club Tijuana	v. Dominican Republic, 17 April 2026

== Competitive record ==
=== FIFA Women's World Cup ===
FIFA Women's World Cup record
Year	Result	Position	Pld	W	D*	L	GF	GA
(China) 1991	Did not qualify							
(Sweden) 1995	Did not enter							
(United States) 1999	Did not qualify							
(United States) 2003	Did not qualify							
(China) 2007	Did not qualify							
(Germany) 2011	Did not qualify							
(Canada) 2015	Did not qualify							
(France) 2019	Did not qualify							
(Australia) (New Zealand) 2023	Group stage	4	3	0	0	3	0	4
(Brazil) 2027	To be determined							
(Mexico) (United States) 2031	To be determined							
(United Kingdom) 2035	To be determined							
Total	1/12	3	0	0	3	0	0	4

*Draws include knockout matches decided on penalty kicks.

=== Olympic Games ===
Summer Olympics record									Qualifying record						
Year	Result	Position	Pld	W	D*	L	GF	GA	Pld	W	D*	L	GF	GA	GD
(United States) 1996	Did not enter								1995 FIFA WWC						
(Australia) 2000	Did not qualify								1999 FIFA WWC						
(Greece) 2004	Did not qualify								5	2	0	3	12	21	-9
(China) 2008	Did not qualify								2	1	0	1	3	3	0
(United Kingdom) 2012	Did not qualify								6	3	1	2	16	9	+7
(Brazil) 2016	Did not qualify								3	2	0	1	29	3	+26
(Japan) 2020	Did not qualify								5	3	0	2	18	7	+11
(France) 2024	Did not qualify								2022 CONCACAF W Championship						
Total	-	-	-	-	-	-	-	-	24	12	1	11	81	50	+31

*Draws include knockout matches decided on penalty kicks.

=== CONCACAF W Championship ===
CONCACAF W Championship record									Qualification record						
Year	Result	Position	Pld	W	D*	L	GF	GA	Pld	W	D*	L	GF	GA	GD
(Haiti) 1991	Fourth place	5	2	0	3	7	16	–9	Qualified as host						
(United States) 1993	Did not enter								Did not enter						
(Canada) 1994	Did not enter								Did not enter						
(Canada) 1998	Group stage	3	0	0	3	3	11	–8	2	2	0	0	9	2	+7
(United States) 2000	Did not enter								Did not enter						
(Canada) (United States) 2002	Group stage	3	1	0	2	3	17	–14	7	5	1	1	18	3	+15
(United States) 2006	Did not qualify								3	2	0	1	8	3	+5
(Mexico) 2010	Group stage	3	1	0	2	1	8	–7	5	5	0	0	16	2	+14
(United States) 2014	Group stage	3	1	0	2	1	7	–6	2014 Caribbean Cup						
(United States) 2018	Did not qualify								3	2	1	0	15	2	+13
(Mexico) 2022	Group stage	3	1	0	2	3	7	–4	4	4	0	0	44	0	+44
(United States) 2026	Qualified								4	3	1	0	16	1	+15
Total	6/11	20	6	0	14	18	66	-48	28	20	1	2	126	13	+113

*Draws include knockout matches decided on penalty kicks.

=== CONCACAF W Gold Cup ===
CONCACAF W Gold Cup record								Qualification record							
Year	Result	Pld	W	D*	L	GF	GA	Division	Group	Pld	W	D*	L	GF	GA
(United States) 2024	Did not qualify							A	C	5	3	0	2	26	3
2029	To be determined							To be determined							
Total	–	–	–	–	–	–	–	–	–	5	3	0	2	26	3

*Draws include knockout matches decided on penalty kicks.

=== Pan American Games ===
Pan American Games record
Year	Result	Position	Pld	W	D*	L	GF	GA
(Canada) 1999	Did not enter							
(Dominican Republic) 2003	Group stage	6th	2	0	0	2	1	9
(Brazil) 2007	Did not enter							
(Mexico) 2011	Did not qualify							
(Canada) 2015	Did not qualify							
(Peru) 2019	Did not qualify							
(Chile) 2023	Did not qualify							
Total	Group stage	1/7	2	0	0	2	1	9

*Draws include knockout matches decided on penalty kicks.

=== Central American and Caribbean Games ===
Central American and Caribbean Games record
Year	Result	Position	Pld	W	D*	L	GF	GA
(Puerto Rico) 2010	Fourth place	4th	5	2	1	2	6	6
(Mexico) 2014	Group stage	6th	3	0	1	2	1	5
(Colombia) 2018	Withdrew							
(El Salvador) 2023	Group stage	8th	3	0	0	3	2	9
(Dominican Republic) 2026	To be determined							
Total	Fourth place	3/5	11	2	2	7	9	20

*Draws include knockout matches decided on penalty kicks.

=== CFU Women's Caribbean Cup ===
CFU Women's Caribbean Cup record
Year	Result	Position	Pld	W	D*	L	GF	GA
(Haiti) 2000	Champions	1st	5	5	0	0	13	2
(Trinidad and Tobago) 2014	Third place	3rd	6	5	0	1	18	4
(Haiti) 2018	Group C Winner	1st	2	2	0	0	21	0
Total	1 Title	3/3	13	12	0	1	52	6

*Draws include knockout matches decided on penalty kicks.

== Honours ==
=== Regional ===
- CFU Women's Caribbean Cup

Champions (1): 2000
Third place (1): 2014

== See also ==
- Sport in Haiti
  - Football in Haiti
    - Women's football in Haiti
- Haiti men's national football team
- Haiti women's national under-20 football team
- Haiti women's national under-17 football team
