= Grenoble Foot 38 (women) =

Women's football club in Grenoble, France

Grenoble
- Full name: Grenoble Foot 38
- Nickname: GF38
- Ground: Stade du Vercors
- Capacity: 1,000
- President: Alain Fessler
- Manager: Nicolas Delépine
- League: Seconde Ligue
- 2025–26: Seconde Ligue, 5th of 12
- Website: https://www.gf38.fr
Home colours	Away colours	Third colours

Grenoble Foot 38, commonly referred to as simply Grenoble or GF38, is a women's football club based in Grenoble, France. The club was called Grenoble Foot Féminin until it was merged by the town's men's football club, Grenoble Foot 38, in 1997. In 2016, GF38 merged with neighboring Grenoble Métropole Claix Football Féminin, which put the club's team in the Division 2.

== History ==
Grenoble Foot Féminin reached the Division 1 Féminine for the first time in its history in 1981, after having spent several years in the regional divisions of the Ligue Rhône-Alpes. The club would then go back and forth between the Division 1 and Division 2 until 1992, when relegation from the Division 1 that year provoked a rapid fall to the regional divisions of the Ligue Rhône-Alpes. Grenoble would only return to national-level football after the merger with Grenoble Métropole Claix Football Féminin (GMC2F) in 2016.

In 1997, on political will, the masculin clubs of Olympique Grenoble Isère and Norcap Grenoble merged to create Grenoble Foot 38. At the same time, Grenoble Foot Féminin was integrated into the club.

In the 2015–16 season, the first team of Grenoble competed in the Division d'Honneur, the fourth level of women's football in France, while neighboring club Grenoble Métropole Claix FF was playing in the Division 2. After initial rumours in June 2016, the absorption process took place in less than one month. The French Football Federation ratified the merger, and the playing rights of GMC2F were subsequently handed over to GF38. Therefore, the players and coaches of GMC2F, supplemented by several signings, participated in the Division 2 under the colors of Grenoble Foot 38.

== Players ==
=== Squad ===
As of 2 October 2024

Note: Flags indicate national team as defined under FIFA eligibility rules; some limited exceptions apply. Players may hold more than one non-FIFA nationality.

No.	Pos.	Nation	Player
3	DF	FRA	Romane Pilot
11	DF	ALG	Armelle Khellas
5	DF	FRA	Elsa Domenjoud
18	MF	FRA	Candice Charbonnier
10	MF	FRA	Laurine Baga
8	MF	FRA	Louise Grandjean Beylot
19	MF	SEN	Ndeye Lohourignon
—	MF	FRA	Taina Pereira
15	DF	FRA	Sylvie Renault
—	DF	IRL	Anna Cantwell

No.	Pos.	Nation	Player
9	FW	FRA	Claudia Fabre
13	DF	FRA	Angélique Schlepp
30	GK	FRA	Julie Tissino
24	DF	FRA	Tifanie De Sousa
12	FW	MTQ	Audrey Duranty
21	FW	FRA	Nehla Sadiki
14	FW	FRA	Mara Irys Akpa
22	MF	TUN	Yosra Ben Hadj
23	DF	FRA	Ophélie Wasner
28	FW	FRA	Mélanie Chabrier

=== Notable former players ===
- (France) Nadjma Ali Nadjim
- (Algeria) Inès Boutaleb
- (Jordan) Maysa Jbarah
- (Algeria) Lina Khelif
- (Lebanon) Pilar Khoury
- (Gabon) Winie Mapangou
- (The Gambia) Adama Tamba
