= Haiti women's national under-20 football team =

Haiti
- Nickname(s): Les Grenadières; Le Rouge et Bleu; Les Bicolores; La Sélection Nationale
- Association: Fédération Haïtienne de Football (FHF)
- Confederation: CONCACAF (North America)
- Sub-confederation: CFU (Caribbean)
- Head coach: Laurent Mortel
- Home stadium: Stade Sylvio Cator
- FIFA code: HAI
First colours	Second colours

Biggest win
- Haiti 16–0 Anguilla (Port-au-Prince, Haiti; July 19, 2017)

World Cup
- Appearances: 1 (first in 2018)
- Best result: Group stage (2018)

CONCACAF Women's U-20 Championship
- Appearances: 5 (first in 2012)
- Best result: Third place (2018, 2020)

The Haiti women's national under-20 football team represents Haiti in international football for women at this age level and is controlled by the Fédération Haïtienne de Football (FHF).

== History ==
The team participated in the 2016 FIFA U-20 Women's World Cup qualification in Honduras. The roster included Nérilia Mondésir and Batcheba Louis. Their first game of group play saw them defeat Panama 3–2.

The team participated in qualifying for the 2018 FIFA U-20 Women's World Cup on the regional level, with Haiti serving as host for the first round of group play. Most of the players on the squad for qualification were drawn from the u-20 team. They defeated Cuba 3–1 in one of their games in continental qualification. The team for the match included Liliane Perez, who scored her team's first goal in the 11th minute The roster also included Liaumeris Hernandez and Sherly Jeudy. Jeudy came off the bench, replacing Hernandez to score Haiti's second goal of the game. Mondésir scored the team's third goal. The victory left the Haitians at the top of their group at the end of group play. An earlier match in group play saw them defeat Dominica 7–0, with Jeudy, Mondésir, Roseline Éloissaint and Melchie Dumornay all contributing goals. They opened group play against Anguilla.

== Competitive record ==
=== FIFA U-20 Women's World Cup ===
FIFA U-20 Women's World Cup
Hosts / Year	Result	Pld	W	D*	L	GF	GA
(Canada) 2002	Did not qualify						
(Thailand) 2004	Withdrew						
(Russia) 2006	Did not qualify						
(Chile) 2008	Did not qualify						
(Germany) 2010	Did not enter						
(Japan) 2012	Did not qualify						
(Canada) 2014	Did not enter						
(Papua New Guinea) 2016	Did not qualify						
(France) 2018	Group Stage	3	0	0	3	3	6
(Costa Rica) 2022	Did not qualify						
(Colombia) 2024	Withdrew						
(Poland) 2026	Did not qualify						
Total	1/12	3	0	0	3	3	6

=== CONCACAF Women's U-20 Championship ===
CONCACAF Women's U-20 Championship record
Year	Result	Position	Pld	W	D*	L	GF	GA
(Trinidad and Tobago) 2002	Group stage	5th	3	1	0	2	2	10
(Canada) 2004	Did not qualify							
(Mexico) 2006	Did not qualify							
(Mexico) 2008	Did not qualify							
(Guatemala) 2010	Did not enter qualifiers							
(Panama) 2012	Group stage	7th	3	0	1	2	0	15
(Cayman Islands) 2014	Did not enter qualifiers							
(Honduras) 2015	Group stage	6th	3	1	0	2	3	13
(Trinidad and Tobago) 2018	Third place	3rd	4	2	0	2	7	9
(Dominican Republic) 2020	Third place	3rd	6	5	1	0	37	1
(Dominican Republic) 2022	Quarter-finals	7th	5	2	2	1	5	9
(Dominican Republic) 2023	Withdrew qualifiers							
(Costa Rica) 2025	Did not qualify							
Total	Third place	6/13	24	11	4	9	54	57

=== FIFA U-20 Women's CAC 2023 ===
29 June CAC games group stage	Haiti	1–3	Centro Caribe Sports (Note: Due to the suspension of the Guatemalan Olympic Committee in 2022, Guatemala is competing at the 2023 Central American and Caribbean Games under the Centro Caribe Sports flag.)	Santa Tecla, El Salvador
14:00 CST (UTC−6)	Joseph 76'	Report	Martínez 13', 79', 90'	Stadium: Estadio Las Delicias; Referee: Janeishka Caban (United States)

1 July CAC games group stage	Venezuela	4–1	Haiti	Santa Tecla, El Salvador
14:00 CST (UTC−6)	Castellanos 13', 89'; Villamizar 38'; Apóstol 84'	Report	Jean 8'	Stadium: Estadio Las Delicias; Referee: Mirian León (El Salvador)

3 July CAC games group stage	Costa Rica	2–0	Haiti	Santa Tecla, El Salvador
14:00 CST (UTC−6)	Herrera 41'; St-Cyr 78' (o.g.)	Report		Stadium: Estadio Las Delicias; Referee: Neressa Goldson (Jamaica)

== Roster ==
Roster who competed at the 2018 CONCACAF Women's U-20 Championship and for the first time in history, qualified for the 2018 FIFA U-20 Women's World Cup.

No.	Pos.	Player	Date of birth (age)	Club
12	GK	Naphtaline Clemeus	1 August 1998 (aged 19)	(Haitian Football Federation) Tigresse
1	GK	Kerly Theus	7 January 1999 (aged 19)	(Haitian Football Federation) Aigle Brillant
4	DF	Émeline Charles	27 October 1999 (aged 18)	(Haitian Football Federation) Aigle Brillant
16	DF	Taina Gervais	8 November 1999 (aged 18)	(Haitian Football Federation) Tigresse
13	DF	Rosiannae Jean	24 November 1999 (aged 18)	(Haitian Football Federation) Tigresse
5	DF	Dougenie Joseph	13 September 2003 (aged 14)	(Haitian Football Federation) ASF Croix des B
2	DF	Rutnhy Mathurin	14 January 2001 (aged 17)	(Haitian Football Federation) ASF Croix des B
3	DF	Naphtalie Northe	21 January 1999 (aged 18)	(Haitian Football Federation) Aigle Brillant
6	DF	Betina Petit-Frère	1 August 2003 (aged 14)	(Haitian Football Federation) ASF Croix des B
17	DF	Flero Dina	16 January 2003 (aged 15)	(Haitian Football Federation) ASF Croix des B
14	MF	Rachelle Caremus	3 February 2003 (aged 14)	(Haitian Football Federation) ASF Croix des B
7	MF	Melissa Dacius	24 May 1999 (aged 18)	(Haitian Football Federation) Tigresse
11	MF	Roseline Éloissaint	20 February 1999 (aged 18)	(Haitian Football Federation) Tigresse
15	MF	Danielle Étienne	16 January 2001 (aged 17)	(United States Soccer Federation) New York City FC
20	MF	Dolores Jean Thomas	16 May 1999 (aged 18)	(Haitian Football Federation) Tigresse
9	MF	Sherly Jeudy	13 October 1998 (aged 19)	(Haitian Football Federation) Anacaona Leogane
19	MF	Magdala Macean	12 January 1999 (aged 19)	(Haitian Football Federation) Anacaona
8	MF	Nelourde Nicolas	26 July 1999 (aged 18)	(Haitian Football Federation) Anacaona Leogane
18	FW	Melchie Dumornay	17 August 2003 (aged 14)	(Haitian Football Federation) ASF Croix des B
10	FW	Nérilia Mondésir (c)	17 January 1999 (aged 19)	(French Football Federation) Montpellier

== Matches ==
Opponent	Score	Competition	Date
Panama	3–2	2016 FIFA U-20 Women's World Cup qualification	5 December 2015
Cuba	3–1	2018 FIFA U-20 Women's World Cup qualification	July 2017
Anguilla	16–0	2018 FIFA U-20 Women's World Cup qualification	19 July 2017
Dominica	7–0	2018 FIFA U-20 Women's World Cup qualification	23 July 2017

== Head-to-head record ==
The following table shows Haiti's head-to-head record in the FIFA U-20 Women's World Cup.

Opponent	Pld	W	D	L	GF	GA	GD	Win %
China	1	0	0	1	1	2	−1	0.00
Germany	1	0	0	1	2	3	−1	0.00
Nigeria	1	0	0	1	0	1	−1	0.00
Total	3	0	0	3	3	6	−3	0.00

== See also ==
- Haiti women's national football team
- Haiti women's national under-17 football team
