= 2023 FIFA Women's World Cup play-off tournament squads =

List of squads for men's international team for FIFA World Cup 2022

The inter-confederation play-offs of qualification for the 2023 FIFA Women's World Cup was an international women's football tournament held in New Zealand from 17 to 23 February 2023. The twelve national teams involved in the tournament, including two only playing friendly matches, were required to register a squad of up to 23 players, including three goalkeepers. Only players in these squads were eligible to take part in the tournament.

Each team had to submit to FIFA a provisional release list of between 35 and 55 players per national team, including four goalkeepers. The release lists were not made public by FIFA. From the preliminary squad, the final list of up to 23 players per national team were submitted to FIFA. FIFA published the final lists with squad numbers on their website on 13 February (New Zealand time). The final matchday at club level for players named in the final squads was 12 February 2023, while clubs had to release their players by the following day. In the event that a player on the submitted squad list suffered from an injury or illness prior to her team's first match of the tournament, that player could be replaced at any time up to 24 hours before their first match. The team doctor and the FIFA General Medical Officer had to both confirm that the injury or illness was severe enough to prevent the player from participating in the tournament. Replacement players did not need to be limited to the preliminary list.

The position listed for each player is per the official squad list published by FIFA. The age listed for each player is as of 17 February 2023, the first day of the tournament. The numbers of caps and goals listed for each player do not include any matches played after the start of the tournament. The club listed is the club for which the player last played a competitive match prior to the tournament. The nationality for each club reflects the national association (not the league) to which the club is affiliated. A flag is included for coaches who are of a different nationality to their team.

== Group A ==
=== Cameroon ===
Coach: Gabriel Zabo

| No. | Pos. | Player | Date of birth (age) | Caps | Goals | Club |
|---|---|---|---|---|---|---|
| 1 | GK | Cathy Biya | 18 July 2006 (aged 16) | | | (Cameroonian Football Federation) Éclair FF de Sa'a |
| 2 | FW | Tatiana Ewodo Ekogo | 9 February 1997 (aged 26) | | | (Russian Football Union) CSKA Moscow |
| 3 | FW | Ajara Nchout | 12 January 1993 (aged 30) | | | (Italian Football Federation) Internazionale |
| 4 | MF | Catherine Mbengono | 8 September 1996 (aged 26) | | | (Cameroonian Football Federation) Fortuna Yaoundé |
| 5 | DF | Ousmanou Doudou | 26 January 1996 (aged 27) | | | (Cameroonian Football Federation) Amazone FAP |
| 6 | DF | Estelle Johnson | 21 July 1988 (aged 34) | | | (United States Soccer Federation) North Carolina Courage |
| 7 | FW | Gabrielle Onguéné (captain) | 25 February 1989 (aged 33) | | | (Russian Football Union) CSKA Moscow |
| 8 | MF | Fatima Komé | 22 July 2002 (aged 20) | | | (French Football Federation) Soyaux |
| 9 | FW | Brenda Tabe | 2 December 2003 (aged 19) | | | (Cameroonian Football Federation) Lékié FF |
| 10 | MF | Jeannette Yango | 12 June 1993 (aged 29) | | | (French Football Federation) Fleury |
| 11 | DF | Aurelle Awona | 2 February 1993 (aged 30) | | | (Portuguese Football Federation) Braga |
| 12 | DF | Claudine Meffometou | 1 July 1990 (aged 32) | | | (French Football Federation) Fleury |
| 13 | MF | Charlène Meyong | 19 November 1998 (aged 24) | | | (French Football Federation) Reims |
| 14 | MF | Monique Ngock | 17 September 2004 (aged 18) | | | (French Football Federation) Reims |
| 15 | DF | Colette Ndzana | 19 July 2000 (aged 22) | | | (Royal Spanish Football Federation) UDG Tenerife |
| 16 | GK | Ange Bawou | 12 February 2000 (aged 23) | | | (Nigeria Football Federation) Bayelsa Queens |
| 17 | MF | Brigitte Omboudou | 29 July 1992 (aged 30) | | | (Cameroonian Football Federation) FC Ebolowa |
| 18 | MF | Claudia Dabda | 1 July 2001 (aged 21) | | | (Football Federation of Belarus) Dinamo Minsk |
| 19 | FW | Éliane Bibout | 20 February 1999 (aged 23) | | | (Cameroonian Football Federation) Éclair FF de Sa'a |
| 20 | MF | Genevieve Ngo Mbeleck | 10 March 1993 (aged 29) | | | (Israel Football Association) Maccabi Kishronot Hadera |
| 21 | DF | Eliane Bodolo | 3 July 1991 (aged 31) | | | (Royal Spanish Football Federation) Juan Grande |
| 22 | FW | Michaela Abam | 12 June 1997 (aged 25) | | | (United States Soccer Federation) Houston Dash |
| 23 | GK | Marthe Ongmahan | 12 June 1992 (aged 30) | | | (Cameroonian Football Federation) AS AWA FC |

=== Portugal ===
Coach: Francisco Neto

| No. | Pos. | Player | Date of birth (age) | Caps | Goals | Club |
|---|---|---|---|---|---|---|
| 1 | GK | Inês Pereira | 26 May 1999 (aged 23) | | | (Swiss Football Association) Servette |
| 2 | DF | Catarina Amado | 21 July 1999 (aged 23) | | | (Portuguese Football Federation) Benfica |
| 3 | DF | Lúcia Alves | 22 October 1997 (aged 25) | | | (Portuguese Football Federation) Benfica |
| 4 | DF | Sílvia Rebelo | 20 May 1989 (aged 33) | | | (Portuguese Football Federation) Benfica |
| 5 | DF | Joana Marchão | 24 October 1996 (aged 26) | | | (Italian Football Federation) Parma |
| 6 | MF | Andreia Jacinto | 8 June 2002 (aged 20) | | | (Royal Spanish Football Federation) Real Sociedad |
| 7 | MF | Vanessa Marques | 12 April 1996 (aged 26) | | | (Portuguese Football Federation) Braga |
| 8 | MF | Andreia Norton | 15 August 1996 (aged 26) | | | (Portuguese Football Federation) Benfica |
| 9 | FW | Ana Borges | 15 June 1990 (aged 32) | | | (Portuguese Football Federation) Sporting CP |
| 10 | FW | Jéssica Silva | 11 December 1994 (aged 28) | | | (Portuguese Football Federation) Benfica |
| 11 | MF | Tatiana Pinto | 28 March 1994 (aged 28) | | | (Royal Spanish Football Federation) Levante |
| 12 | GK | Patrícia Morais | 17 June 1992 (aged 30) | | | (Portuguese Football Federation) Braga |
| 13 | MF | Fátima Pinto | 16 January 1996 (aged 27) | | | (Royal Spanish Football Federation) Alavés |
| 14 | MF | Dolores Silva | 7 August 1991 (aged 31) | | | (Portuguese Football Federation) Braga |
| 15 | DF | Carole Costa (captain) | 3 May 1990 (aged 32) | | | (Portuguese Football Federation) Benfica |
| 16 | FW | Diana Silva | 4 June 1995 (aged 27) | | | (Portuguese Football Federation) Sporting CP |
| 17 | DF | Ana Seiça | 25 March 2001 (aged 21) | | | (Portuguese Football Federation) Benfica |
| 18 | FW | Carolina Mendes | 27 November 1987 (aged 35) | | | (Portuguese Football Federation) Sporting CP |
| 19 | DF | Diana Gomes | 26 July 1998 (aged 24) | | | (Royal Spanish Football Federation) Sevilla |
| 20 | FW | Francisca Nazareth | 17 November 2002 (aged 20) | | | (Portuguese Football Federation) Benfica |
| 21 | FW | Ana Capeta | 22 December 1997 (aged 25) | | | (Portuguese Football Federation) Sporting CP |
| 22 | GK | Rute Costa | 1 June 1994 (aged 28) | | | (Portuguese Football Federation) Benfica |
| 23 | FW | Telma Encarnação | 11 October 2001 (aged 21) | | | (Portuguese Football Federation) Marítimo |

=== Thailand ===
Coach: (Japan) Miyo Okamoto

| No. | Pos. | Player | Date of birth (age) | Caps | Goals | Club |
|---|---|---|---|---|---|---|
| 1 | GK | Waraporn Boonsing | 16 February 1990 (aged 33) | | | (Football Association of Thailand) Bundit Asia |
| 2 | DF | Kanjanaporn Saenkhun | 18 July 1996 (aged 26) | | | (Football Association of Thailand) Bundit Asia |
| 3 | DF | Supapron Intaraprasit | 18 February 2004 (aged 18) | | | (Football Association of Thailand) Chonburi |
| 4 | DF | Phornphirun Philawan | 8 April 1999 (aged 23) | | | (Football Association of Thailand) Bundit Asia |
| 5 | DF | Nualanong Muensri | 28 February 2004 (aged 18) | | | (Football Association of Thailand) MH Nakhonsi |
| 6 | MF | Ploychompoo Somnuek | 26 December 2002 (aged 20) | | | (Football Association of Thailand) Bundit Asia |
| 7 | MF | Silawan Intamee (captain) | 22 January 1994 (aged 29) | | | (Football Association of Thailand) Chonburi |
| 8 | MF | Nipawan Panyosuk | 15 March 1995 (aged 27) | | | (Football Association of Thailand) Chonburi |
| 9 | DF | Warunee Phetwiset | 13 December 1990 (aged 32) | | | (Football Association of Thailand) MH Nakhonsi |
| 10 | DF | Sunisa Srangthaisong | 6 May 1988 (aged 34) | | | (Football Association of Thailand) Bundit Asia |
| 11 | DF | Chatchawan Rodthong | 22 June 2002 (aged 20) | | | (Football Association of Thailand) Bangkok |
| 12 | MF | Nutwadee Pram-nak | 9 October 2000 (aged 22) | | | (Football Association of Thailand) Bangkok |
| 13 | FW | Pattaranan Aupachai | 9 July 2002 (aged 20) | | | (Football Association of Thailand) Chonburi |
| 14 | FW | Saowalak Pengngam | 30 November 1996 (aged 26) | | | (Football Association of Thailand) Chonburi |
| 15 | MF | Orapin Waenngoen | 7 October 1995 (aged 27) | | | (Football Association of Thailand) Bundit Asia |
| 16 | MF | Sudarat Chuchuen | 19 June 1997 (aged 25) | | | (Football Association of Thailand) Bundit Asia |
| 17 | FW | Taneekarn Dangda | 15 December 1992 (aged 30) | | | (Football Association of Thailand) Bangkok |
| 18 | GK | Chotmanee Thongmongkol | 12 January 1999 (aged 24) | | | (Football Association of Thailand) Chonburi |
| 19 | DF | Panittha Jeeratanapavibul | 15 November 2001 (aged 21) | | | (Football Association of Thailand) Bangkok |
| 20 | MF | Irravadee Makris | 20 January 1992 (aged 31) | | | Unattached |
| 21 | FW | Jiraporn Mongkoldee | 13 August 1998 (aged 24) | | | (Football Association of Thailand) Chonburi |
| 22 | GK | Nattaruja Muthtanawech | 21 August 1996 (aged 26) | | | (Football Association of Thailand) Bundit Asia |
| 23 | FW | Janista Jinantuya | 9 September 2003 (aged 19) | | | (French Football Federation) Soyaux |

== Group B ==
=== Chile ===
Coach: José Letelier

| No. | Pos. | Player | Date of birth (age) | Caps | Goals | Club |
|---|---|---|---|---|---|---|
| 1 | GK | Christiane Endler (captain) | 23 July 1991 (aged 31) | | | (French Football Federation) Lyon |
| 2 | DF | Catalina Figueroa | 28 January 2005 (aged 18) | | | (Football Federation of Chile) Universidad Católica |
| 3 | DF | Carla Guerrero | 23 December 1987 (aged 35) | | | (Football Federation of Chile) Universidad de Chile |
| 4 | MF | Francisca Lara | 29 July 1990 (aged 32) | | | (Royal Spanish Football Federation) Villarreal |
| 5 | DF | Fernanda Ramírez | 30 August 1992 (aged 30) | | | (Football Federation of Chile) Colo-Colo |
| 6 | MF | Gisela Pino | 1 September 1992 (aged 30) | | | (Colombian Football Federation) Deportivo Cali |
| 7 | FW | Yenny Acuña | 18 May 1997 (aged 25) | | | (Brazilian Football Confederation) Bahia |
| 8 | MF | Karen Araya | 16 October 1990 (aged 32) | | | (Royal Spanish Football Federation) Madrid CFF |
| 9 | FW | Sonya Keefe | 11 April 2003 (aged 19) | | | (Royal Spanish Football Federation) Cacereño |
| 10 | FW | Valentina Navarrete | 13 July 2003 (aged 19) | | | (Football Federation of Chile) Santiago Morning |
| 11 | MF | Yessenia López | 20 October 1990 (aged 32) | | | (Football Federation of Chile) Colo-Colo |
| 12 | GK | Antonia Canales | 16 October 2002 (aged 20) | | | (Royal Spanish Football Federation) Real Oviedo |
| 13 | FW | Javiera Grez | 11 July 2000 (aged 22) | | | (Football Federation of Chile) Colo-Colo |
| 14 | MF | Ivette Olivares | 4 August 1997 (aged 25) | | | (Football Federation of Chile) Palestino |
| 15 | FW | Daniela Zamora | 13 November 1990 (aged 32) | | | (Football Federation of Chile) Universidad de Chile |
| 16 | FW | Isidora Olave | 23 April 2002 (aged 20) | | | (Football Federation of Chile) Colo-Colo |
| 17 | MF | Fernanda Hidalgo | 4 May 1998 (aged 24) | | | (Football Federation of Chile) Colo-Colo |
| 18 | DF | Camila Sáez | 17 October 1994 (aged 28) | | | (Royal Spanish Football Federation) Alavés |
| 19 | FW | María José Rojas | 17 December 1987 (aged 35) | | | (Football Australia) Melbourne City |
| 20 | MF | Yastin Jiménez | 17 October 2000 (aged 22) | | | (Football Federation of Chile) Colo-Colo |
| 21 | FW | Rosario Balmaceda | 26 March 1999 (aged 23) | | | Unattached |
| 22 | FW | Ámbar Figueroa | 24 October 2007 (aged 15) | | | (Football Federation of Chile) Santiago Morning |
| 23 | GK | Ryann Torrero | 1 September 1990 (aged 32) | | | (Football Federation of Chile) Colo-Colo |

=== Haiti ===
Coach: (France) Nicolas Delépine

| No. | Pos. | Player | Date of birth (age) | Caps | Goals | Club |
|---|---|---|---|---|---|---|
| 1 | GK | Kerly Théus | 7 January 1999 (aged 24) | | | (United States Soccer Federation) FC Miami City |
| 2 | DF | Chelsea Surpris | 20 December 1996 (aged 26) | | | (French Football Federation) Grenoble |
| 3 | MF | Jennyfer Limage | 25 December 1997 (aged 25) | | | (French Football Federation) Grenoble |
| 4 | DF | Tabita Joseph | 13 September 2003 (aged 19) | | | (French Football Federation) Brest |
| 5 | MF | Maudeline Moryl | 24 January 2003 (aged 20) | | | (French Football Federation) Grenoble |
| 6 | FW | Melchie Dumornay | 17 August 2003 (aged 19) | | | (French Football Federation) Reims |
| 7 | FW | Batcheba Louis | 15 June 1997 (aged 25) | | | (French Football Federation) Fleury |
| 8 | MF | Danielle Étienne | 16 January 2001 (aged 22) | | | (United States Soccer Federation) Fordham Rams |
| 9 | MF | Sherly Jeudy | 13 October 1998 (aged 24) | | | Unattached |
| 10 | FW | Nérilia Mondésir (captain) | 17 January 1999 (aged 24) | | | (French Football Federation) Montpellier |
| 11 | FW | Roseline Éloissaint | 20 February 1999 (aged 23) | | | (French Football Federation) Nantes |
| 12 | GK | Gabrielle Emilien | 31 May 1996 (aged 26) | | | (Canadian Soccer Association) Ottawa Gee-Gees |
| 13 | DF | Betina Petit-Frère | 1 August 2003 (aged 19) | | | (French Football Federation) Brest |
| 14 | DF | Claire Constant | 13 October 1999 (aged 23) | | | (Portuguese Football Federation) Torreense |
| 15 | FW | Darlina Joseph | 15 December 2003 (aged 19) | | | (Haitian Football Federation) Don Bosco |
| 16 | MF | Milan Pierre-Jérôme | 23 April 2002 (aged 20) | | | (United States Soccer Federation) George Washington Colonials |
| 17 | FW | Rose-Alya Marcellus | 22 March 2003 (aged 19) | | | (French Football Federation) Issy |
| 18 | FW | Noa Ganthier | 13 October 2002 (aged 20) | | | (United States Soccer Federation) Lipscomb Bisons |
| 19 | MF | Dayana Pierre Louis | 24 September 2003 (aged 19) | | | (French Football Federation) Issy |
| 20 | DF | Kethna Louis | 5 August 1996 (aged 26) | | | (French Football Federation) Reims |
| 21 | DF | Ruthny Mathurin | 14 January 2001 (aged 22) | | | (United States Soccer Federation) Louisiana Ragin' Cajuns |
| 22 | FW | Roselord Borgella | 1 April 1993 (aged 29) | | | (French Football Federation) Dijon |
| 23 | GK | Lara Larco | 27 November 2002 (aged 20) | | | (United States Soccer Federation) Georgetown Hoyas |

=== Senegal ===
Coach: Serigne Cissé

| No. | Pos. | Player | Date of birth (age) | Caps | Goals | Club |
|---|---|---|---|---|---|---|
| 1 | GK | Thiaba Séné | 14 March 1995 (aged 27) | | | (Senegalese Football Federation) Aigles de la Médina |
| 2 | DF | Marième Babou | 13 April 2003 (aged 19) | | | (Senegalese Football Federation) Parcelles Assainies |
| 3 | DF | Anta Dembele | 15 June 1994 (aged 28) | | | (Senegalese Football Federation) Dakar Sacré-Cœur |
| 4 | DF | Astou Sy | 11 December 1986 (aged 36) | | | (Senegalese Football Federation) Dakar Sacré-Cœur |
| 5 | DF | Wolimata Ndiaye | 10 January 2004 (aged 19) | | | (Senegalese Football Federation) Dakar Sacré-Cœur |
| 6 | MF | Edmée Diagne | 11 October 1994 (aged 28) | | | (Senegalese Football Federation) Dakar Sacré-Cœur |
| 7 | FW | Mama Diop | 9 October 1994 (aged 28) | | | (French Football Federation) Marseille |
| 8 | DF | Mbayang Sow | 21 January 1993 (aged 30) | | | (French Football Federation) Marseille |
| 9 | FW | Nguenar Ndiaye | 10 January 1995 (aged 28) | | | (French Football Federation) Bourges Foot 18 |
| 10 | MF | Ndeye Awa Diakhaté | 2 January 1997 (aged 26) | | | (French Football Federation) Marseille |
| 11 | MF | Haby Baldé | 1 January 2000 (aged 23) | | | (Senegalese Football Federation) Dakar Sacré-Cœur |
| 12 | MF | Safietou Sagna (captain) | 11 April 1994 (aged 28) | | | (French Football Federation) Metz |
| 13 | MF | Jeannette Sagna | 4 August 1999 (aged 23) | | | (Senegalese Football Federation) Parcelles Assainies |
| 14 | DF | Salimata Ndiaye | 17 February 1995 (aged 28) | | | (Senegalese Football Federation) AFA Grand-Yoff |
| 15 | FW | Jeanne Coumba Niang | 5 February 1998 (aged 25) | | | (Senegalese Football Federation) Dakar Sacré-Cœur |
| 16 | GK | Tenning Séne | 21 January 1990 (aged 33) | | | (Senegalese Football Federation) AFA Grand-Yoff |
| 17 | FW | Hapsatou Malado Diallo | 14 April 2005 (aged 17) | | | (Senegalese Football Federation) Parcelles Assainies |
| 18 | DF | Meta Camara | 14 August 1997 (aged 25) | | | (French Football Federation) Bourges Foot 18 |
| 19 | MF | Bineta Korkel Seck | 11 January 1998 (aged 25) | | | (Senegalese Football Federation) Dakar Sacré-Cœur |
| 20 | MF | Korka Fall | 19 February 1990 (aged 32) | | | (Senegalese Football Federation) Dakar Sacré-Cœur |
| 21 | DF | Mame Diagne | 20 March 1989 (aged 33) | | | (Senegalese Football Federation) AFA Grand-Yoff |
| 22 | FW | Coumba Sylla Mbodji | 26 August 2003 (aged 19) | | | (Senegalese Football Federation) Parcelles Assainies |
| 23 | GK | Adji Ndiaye | 4 August 2006 (aged 16) | | | (Senegalese Football Federation) Dakar Sacré-Cœur |

== Group C ==
=== Chinese Taipei ===
Coach: Yen Shih-kai

| No. | Pos. | Player | Date of birth (age) | Caps | Goals | Club |
|---|---|---|---|---|---|---|
| 1 | GK | Tsai Ming-jung | 23 January 1989 (aged 34) | | | (Chinese Taipei Football Association) Taichung Blue Whale |
| 2 | MF | Chang Chi-lan | 18 September 1996 (aged 26) | | | (Chinese Taipei Football Association) Taichung Blue Whale |
| 3 | FW | Li Yi-wen | 20 September 2005 (aged 17) | | | (Chinese Taipei Football Association) Hang Yuan |
| 4 | MF | Ting Chia-ying | 25 January 2002 (aged 21) | | | (Chinese Taipei Football Association) Taipei Bravo |
| 5 | DF | Pan Shin-yu | 3 May 1997 (aged 25) | | | (Chinese Taipei Football Association) Taichung Blue Whale |
| 6 | MF | Zhuo Li-ping | 29 September 1999 (aged 23) | | | (Chinese Taipei Football Association) Hualien |
| 7 | MF | Chen Yen-ping | 20 August 1991 (aged 31) | | | (Chinese Taipei Football Association) Hang Yuan |
| 8 | MF | Wang Hsiang-huei | 28 September 1987 (aged 35) | | | (Chinese Taipei Football Association) Hualien |
| 9 | MF | Hsu Yi-yun | 29 April 1997 (aged 25) | | | (Chinese Taipei Football Association) Hualien |
| 10 | FW | Lee Hsiu-chin | 18 August 1992 (aged 30) | | | (Chinese Taipei Football Association) Kaohsiung Sunny Bank |
| 11 | FW | Lai Li-chin | 15 August 1988 (aged 34) | | | (Chinese Taipei Football Association) Taichung Blue Whale |
| 12 | GK | Chu Fang-yi | 30 August 1989 (aged 33) | | | (Chinese Taipei Football Association) Hualien |
| 13 | DF | Su Sin-yun | 20 November 1996 (aged 26) | | | (Chinese Taipei Football Association) Hang Yuan |
| 14 | FW | Jheng Ya-zih | 25 January 2003 (aged 20) | | | (Chinese Taipei Football Association) Taipei Bravo |
| 15 | MF | Lin Ya-han | 15 December 1990 (aged 32) | | | (Chinese Taipei Football Association) Taipei Bravo |
| 16 | DF | Chang Su-hsin | 4 October 1990 (aged 32) | | | (Chinese Taipei Football Association) Hang Yuan |
| 17 | MF | Pan Yen-hsin | 18 February 1996 (aged 26) | | | (Chinese Taipei Football Association) Hualien |
| 18 | GK | Cheng Ssu-yu | 25 September 1989 (aged 33) | | | (Japan Football Association) JEF United Chiba |
| 19 | FW | Su Yu-hsuan | 21 February 2001 (aged 21) | | | (Chinese Taipei Football Association) Taichung Blue Whale |
| 20 | DF | Chen Ying-hui | 5 October 1998 (aged 24) | | | (Chinese Taipei Football Association) Hang Yuan |
| 21 | MF | Pao Hsin-hsuan | 1 September 1992 (aged 30) | | | Unattached |
| 22 | DF | Li Pei-jung | 25 April 2000 (aged 22) | | | (Chinese Taipei Football Association) Taichung Blue Whale |
| 23 | MF | Wu Kai-ching | 14 November 1999 (aged 23) | | | (Chinese Taipei Football Association) Kaohsiung Sunny Bank |

=== Panama ===
Coach: (Mexico) Ignacio Quintana

| No. | Pos. | Player | Date of birth (age) | Caps | Goals | Club |
|---|---|---|---|---|---|---|
| 1 | GK | Sasha Fábrega | 23 October 1990 (aged 32) | | | (Panamanian Football Federation) Tauro |
| 2 | DF | Hilary Jaén | 29 August 2002 (aged 20) | | | (United States Soccer Federation) South Alabama Jaguars |
| 3 | DF | Wendy Natis | 19 August 2002 (aged 20) | | | (Colombian Football Federation) Deportivo Cali |
| 4 | DF | Katherine Castillo | 23 March 1996 (aged 26) | | | (Panamanian Football Federation) Tauro |
| 5 | DF | Yomira Pinzón | 23 August 1996 (aged 26) | | | (Costa Rican Football Federation) Deportivo Saprissa |
| 6 | MF | Deysiré Salazar | 4 May 2004 (aged 18) | | | (Panamanian Football Federation) Tauro |
| 7 | MF | Emily Cedeño | 22 November 2003 (aged 19) | | | (Panamanian Football Federation) Plaza Amador |
| 8 | MF | Schiandra González | 4 July 1995 (aged 27) | | | (Panamanian Football Federation) Plaza Amador |
| 9 | FW | Karla Riley | 18 September 1997 (aged 25) | | | (Mexican Football Federation) Cruz Azul |
| 10 | MF | Marta Cox | 20 July 1997 (aged 25) | | | (Mexican Football Federation) Pachuca |
| 11 | MF | Natalia Mills (captain) | 22 March 1993 (aged 29) | | | (Costa Rican Football Federation) Alajuelense |
| 12 | GK | Yenith Bailey | 29 March 2001 (aged 21) | | | Unattached |
| 13 | FW | Riley Tanner | 15 October 1999 (aged 23) | | | (United States Soccer Federation) Alabama Crimson Tide |
| 14 | MF | Carmen Montenegro | 5 December 2000 (aged 22) | | | (Panamanian Football Federation) Universitario |
| 15 | DF | Rosario Vargas | 9 August 2002 (aged 20) | | | (Royal Spanish Football Federation) Rayo Vallecano |
| 16 | DF | Rebeca Espinosa | 5 July 1992 (aged 30) | | | (Panamanian Football Federation) Plaza Amador |
| 17 | FW | Gabriela Villagrand | 1 December 1999 (aged 23) | | | Unattached |
| 18 | FW | Erika Hernández | 17 March 1999 (aged 23) | | | (Panamanian Football Federation) Plaza Amador |
| 19 | FW | Lineth Cedeño | 5 December 2000 (aged 22) | | | (Italian Football Federation) Sampdoria |
| 20 | MF | Aldrith Quintero | 1 January 2002 (aged 21) | | | (Royal Spanish Football Federation) Alhama CF |
| 21 | MF | Nicole De Obaldía | 16 March 2000 (aged 22) | | | (Costa Rican Football Federation) Herediano |
| 22 | GK | Stephani Vargas | 1 February 1999 (aged 24) | | | (Panamanian Football Federation) Plaza Amador |
| 23 | DF | Carina Baltrip-Reyes | 1 July 1998 (aged 24) | | | (Portuguese Football Federation) Marítimo |

=== Papua New Guinea ===
Coach: (England) Spencer Prior

Daisy Winas withdrew from the initially announced squad and was replaced by Isabella Natera.

| No. | Pos. | Player | Date of birth (age) | Caps | Goals | Club |
|---|---|---|---|---|---|---|
| 1 | GK | Faith Kasiray | 20 December 1999 (aged 23) | | | (Papua New Guinea Football Association) Port Moresby |
| 2 | DF | Lavina Hola | 27 May 1996 (aged 26) | | | (Papua New Guinea Football Association) Port Moresby |
| 3 | DF | Margret Joseph | 4 January 1999 (aged 24) | | | (Papua New Guinea Football Association) Bara |
| 4 | DF | Lucy Maino | 2 August 1995 (aged 27) | | | (Papua New Guinea Football Association) Port Moresby |
| 5 | DF | Olivia Upaupa | 12 March 1997 (aged 25) | | | (Papua New Guinea Football Association) Tusbab Laidamon |
| 6 | MF | Yvonne Gabong | 29 August 1996 (aged 26) | | | (Papua New Guinea Football Association) Port Moresby |
| 7 | MF | Rumona Morris | 5 June 1995 (aged 27) | | | (Papua New Guinea Football Association) Hekari United |
| 8 | MF | Rayleen Bauelua | 11 January 1995 (aged 28) | | | (Papua New Guinea Football Association) Port Moresby |
| 9 | FW | Calista Maneo | 29 September 2002 (aged 20) | | | (Papua New Guinea Football Association) Hekari United |
| 10 | FW | Charlie Yanding | 1 February 1997 (aged 26) | | | (Papua New Guinea Football Association) Bara |
| 11 | FW | Georgina Kaikas | 10 April 1995 (aged 27) | | | (Papua New Guinea Football Association) NCD Souths |
| 12 | DF | Anashtasia Gunemba | 10 June 2000 (aged 22) | | | (Papua New Guinea Football Association) Poro |
| 13 | MF | Ramona Padio (captain) | 13 March 1998 (aged 24) | | | (Papua New Guinea Football Association) Port Moresby |
| 14 | MF | Kesai Kotome | 20 December 1991 (aged 31) | | | (Papua New Guinea Football Association) Bara |
| 15 | DF | Michaelyne Butubu | 23 January 2003 (aged 20) | | | (Papua New Guinea Football Association) Hekari United |
| 16 | MF | Phyllis Pala | 21 July 2003 (aged 19) | | | (Papua New Guinea Football Association) Hekari United |
| 17 | FW | Nenny Elipas | 25 May 2005 (aged 17) | | | (Papua New Guinea Football Association) Bara |
| 18 | DF | Shalom Waida | 15 February 2001 (aged 22) | | | (Papua New Guinea Football Association) Hekari United |
| 19 | FW | Asaiso Gossie | 18 April 2003 (aged 19) | | | (Papua New Guinea Football Association) Tusbab Laidamon |
| 20 | DF | Gloria Laeli | 25 March 1997 (aged 25) | | | (Papua New Guinea Football Association) Port Moresby |
| 21 | DF | Isabella Natera | 24 December 1999 (aged 23) | | | (Papua New Guinea Football Association) Tusbab Laidamon |
| 22 | GK | Betty Sam | 12 October 1995 (aged 27) | | | (Papua New Guinea Football Association) Poro |
| 23 | GK | Leah Loi | 26 April 2000 (aged 22) | | | (Papua New Guinea Football Association) Port Moresby |

=== Paraguay ===
Coach: (Brazil) Marcello Frigério

| No. | Pos. | Player | Date of birth (age) | Caps | Goals | Club |
|---|---|---|---|---|---|---|
| 1 | GK | Cristina Recalde | 29 March 1994 (aged 28) | | | (Royal Spanish Football Federation) Juan Grande |
| 2 | DF | Limpia Fretes | 24 June 2000 (aged 22) | | | (Brazilian Football Confederation) Avaí |
| 3 | DF | Fiorela Martínez | 18 April 2002 (aged 20) | | | (Royal Spanish Football Federation) Sport Extremadura |
| 4 | DF | Daysy Bareiro | 19 January 2001 (aged 22) | | | (Royal Spanish Football Federation) Juan Grande |
| 5 | DF | Verónica Riveros (captain) | 23 April 1987 (aged 35) | | | (Brazilian Football Confederation) Avaí |
| 6 | MF | Dulce Quintana | 6 February 1989 (aged 34) | | | (Portuguese Football Federation) Racing Power |
| 7 | FW | Fabiola Sandoval | 27 May 1999 (aged 23) | | | (Brazilian Football Confederation) Internacional |
| 8 | MF | Rosa Miño | 13 July 1999 (aged 23) | | | (Brazilian Football Confederation) Palmeiras |
| 9 | FW | Lice Chamorro | 22 December 1998 (aged 24) | | | (Royal Spanish Football Federation) Alavés |
| 10 | FW | Jessica Martínez | 14 June 1999 (aged 23) | | | (Royal Spanish Football Federation) Sevilla |
| 11 | MF | Fany Gauto | 19 August 1992 (aged 30) | | | (Brazilian Football Confederation) Internacional |
| 12 | GK | Alicia Bobadilla | 5 June 1994 (aged 28) | | | (Brazilian Football Confederation) Palmeiras |
| 13 | MF | Dahiana Bogarín | 13 November 2000 (aged 22) | | | (Football Federation of Chile) Colo-Colo |
| 14 | DF | Tania Riso | 26 January 1994 (aged 29) | | | (Royal Spanish Football Federation) Juan Grande |
| 15 | MF | Fanny Godoy | 21 January 1998 (aged 25) | | | (Royal Spanish Football Federation) Juan Grande |
| 16 | MF | Ramona Martínez | 21 July 1996 (aged 26) | | | (Brazilian Football Confederation) Palmeiras |
| 17 | DF | Natalia Barros | 28 December 1995 (aged 27) | | | (Paraguayan Football Association) Cerro Porteño |
| 18 | MF | Camila Arrieta | 16 September 2001 (aged 21) | | | (Brazilian Football Confederation) Cruzeiro |
| 19 | FW | Rebeca Fernández | 1 December 1991 (aged 31) | | | (Football Federation of Chile) Universidad de Chile |
| 20 | MF | Lourdes González | 16 July 1999 (aged 23) | | | (Brazilian Football Confederation) Avaí |
| 21 | DF | María Martínez | 24 May 1999 (aged 23) | | | (Football Federation of Chile) Universidad de Chile |
| 22 | GK | Gloria Saleb | 12 June 1991 (aged 31) | | | (Paraguayan Football Association) Olimpia |
| 23 | FW | Fátima Acosta | 7 January 2005 (aged 18) | | | (Paraguayan Football Association) Limpeño |

== Friendly matches ==
=== Argentina ===
Coach: Germán Portanova

Argentina only named a squad of 21 players, leaving the number 10 and 12 shirts unassigned.

| No. | Pos. | Player | Date of birth (age) | Caps | Goals | Club |
|---|---|---|---|---|---|---|
| 1 | GK | Vanina Correa | 14 August 1983 (aged 39) | | | (Argentine Football Association) Rosario Central |
| 2 | DF | Chiara Singarella | 5 December 2003 (aged 19) | | | (United States Soccer Federation) Kennesaw State Owls |
| 3 | FW | Eliana Stábile | 26 November 1993 (aged 29) | | | (Brazilian Football Confederation) Santos |
| 4 | MF | Julieta Cruz | 4 June 1996 (aged 26) | | | (Argentine Football Association) Boca Juniors |
| 5 | MF | Vanesa Santana | 3 September 1990 (aged 32) | | | (Royal Spanish Football Federation) Sporting de Huelva |
| 6 | DF | Aldana Cometti | 3 March 1996 (aged 26) | | | (Royal Spanish Football Federation) Madrid CFF |
| 7 | FW | Romina Núñez | 1 January 1994 (aged 29) | | | Unattached |
| 8 | MF | Daiana Falfán | 14 October 2000 (aged 22) | | | (Argentine Football Association) UAI Urquiza |
| 9 | FW | Paulina Gramaglia | 21 March 2003 (aged 19) | | | (United States Soccer Federation) Houston Dash |
| 11 | FW | Yamila Rodríguez | 24 January 1998 (aged 25) | | | (Argentine Football Association) Boca Juniors |
| 13 | DF | Sophia Braun | 26 January 2000 (aged 23) | | | (United States Soccer Federation) Gonzaga Bulldogs |
| 14 | MF | Miriam Mayorga | 20 November 1989 (aged 33) | | | (Argentine Football Association) Boca Juniors |
| 15 | FW | Florencia Bonsegundo | 14 July 1993 (aged 29) | | | (Royal Spanish Football Federation) Madrid CFF |
| 16 | MF | Lorena Benítez | 3 December 1998 (aged 24) | | | (Brazilian Football Confederation) Palmeiras |
| 17 | MF | Maricel Pereyra | 11 May 2002 (aged 20) | | | (Argentine Football Association) San Lorenzo de Almagro |
| 18 | DF | Gabriela Chávez | 9 April 1989 (aged 33) | | | (Argentine Football Association) Estudiantil Porteño |
| 19 | FW | Mariana Larroquette | 24 October 1992 (aged 30) | | | (Mexican Football Federation) León |
| 20 | DF | Marianela Szymanowski | 31 July 1990 (aged 32) | | | (Royal Spanish Football Federation) Rayo Vallecano |
| 21 | FW | Érica Lonigro | 6 July 1994 (aged 28) | | | (Argentine Football Association) River Plate |
| 22 | FW | Estefanía Banini | 21 June 1990 (aged 32) | | | (Royal Spanish Football Federation) Atlético Madrid |
| 23 | GK | Laurina Oliveros | 10 September 1993 (aged 29) | | | (Argentine Football Association) Boca Juniors |

=== New Zealand ===
Coach: (Czech Republic) Jitka Klimková

New Zealand announced their final squad on 9 February 2023. Anna Leat withdrew injured and was replaced by Murphy Sheaff on 10 February. Victoria Esson withdrew injured and was replaced by Brianna Edwards on 13 February. Rebekah Stott withdrew injured and was replaced by Michaela Foster on 16 February.

| No. | Pos. | Player | Date of birth (age) | Caps | Goals | Club |
|---|---|---|---|---|---|---|
| 1 | GK | Erin Nayler | 17 April 1992 (aged 30) | | | (Swedish Football Association) IFK Norrköping |
| 2 | DF | Kate Taylor | 21 October 2003 (aged 19) | | | (New Zealand Football) Wellington Phoenix |
| 3 | DF | Claudia Bunge | 21 September 1999 (aged 23) | | | (Football Australia) Melbourne Victory |
| 4 | DF | CJ Bott | 22 April 1995 (aged 27) | | | (The Football Association) Leicester City |
| 5 | DF | Meikayla Moore | 4 June 1996 (aged 26) | | | (Scottish Football Association) Glasgow City |
| 6 | MF | Malia Steinmetz | 18 January 1999 (aged 24) | | | (Football Australia) Western Sydney Wanderers |
| 7 | DF | Ali Riley | 30 October 1987 (aged 35) | | | (United States Soccer Federation) Angel City FC |
| 8 | MF | Daisy Cleverley | 30 April 1997 (aged 25) | | | (Danish Football Association) Køge |
| 9 | FW | Gabi Rennie | 7 July 2001 (aged 21) | | | (United States Soccer Federation) Arizona State Sun Devils |
| 10 | FW | Grace Jale | 10 April 1999 (aged 23) | | | (Football Australia) Canberra United |
| 11 | MF | Olivia Chance | 5 October 1993 (aged 29) | | | (Scottish Football Association) Celtic |
| 12 | MF | Betsy Hassett | 4 August 1990 (aged 32) | | | (New Zealand Football) Wellington Phoenix |
| 13 | DF | Michaela Foster | 9 January 1999 (aged 24) | | | (New Zealand Football) Wellington Phoenix |
| 14 | DF | Katie Bowen | 15 April 1994 (aged 28) | | | (Football Australia) Melbourne City |
| 15 | FW | Paige Satchell | 13 April 1998 (aged 24) | | | (New Zealand Football) Wellington Phoenix |
| 16 | DF | Grace Neville | 9 April 2000 (aged 22) | | | (The Football Association) London City Lionesses |
| 17 | FW | Hannah Wilkinson | 28 May 1992 (aged 30) | | | (Football Australia) Melbourne City |
| 18 | DF | Mackenzie Barry | 11 April 2001 (aged 21) | | | (New Zealand Football) Wellington Phoenix |
| 19 | DF | Elizabeth Anton | 12 December 1998 (aged 24) | | | (Football Australia) Perth Glory |
| 20 | FW | Indiah-Paige Riley | 20 December 2001 (aged 21) | | | (Football Australia) Brisbane Roar |
| 21 | GK | Brianna Edwards | 27 January 2003 (aged 20) | | | (Football Australia) Bankstown City |
| 22 | MF | Ava Collins | 18 April 2002 (aged 20) | | | (United States Soccer Federation) St. John's Red Storm |
| 23 | GK | Murphy Sheaff | 12 September 2003 (aged 19) | | | (United States Soccer Federation) Jacksonville Dolphins |
