= 2027 FIFA Women's World Cup qualification =

Tournament details
- Dates: 19 February 2025 – 27 February 2027
- Teams: 179 (from 6 confederations)

Tournament statistics
- Matches played: 452
- Goals scored: 1,706 (3.77 per match)
- Top scorer(s): (Mexico) Charlyn Corral (North Korea) Kim Kyong-yong (13 goals each)
- All statistics correct as of 13 October 2026.

The 2027 FIFA Women's World Cup qualification process determines the 31 teams joining hosts Brazil in the 2027 FIFA Women's World Cup. It is the tenth FIFA Women's World Cup, the quadrennial international women's football world championship tournament. The tournament is the first Women's World Cup to be hosted by a CONMEBOL member association and the second to be held in the Southern Hemisphere, after the previous edition in 2023.

Qualification began on 19 February 2025 with two matches of the CAF zone played that day. The first goal of the qualification series was scored by Algerian player Laura Taleb Muller against South Sudan.

== Slot allocation ==
The allocation of slots for the final tournament was approved by the FIFA Council on 10 December 2024. The slot for the host nation was taken directly from CONMEBOL's allocation.

== Qualified teams ==
Team qualified Team still able to qualify Team eliminated Team withdrew or suspended Did not enter Country has no women's team or is not a FIFA member

Team	Method of qualification	Date of qualification	Total times qualified	Last time qualified	Current consecutive appearances	Previous best performance
Brazil	Hosts	17 May 2024	10	2023	10	Runners-up (2007)
Australia	2026 AFC Women's Asian Cup quarter-final winners	13 March 2026	9	2023	9	Fourth place (2023)
China	2026 AFC Women's Asian Cup quarter-final winners	14 March 2026	9	2023	4	Runners-up (1999)
South Korea	2026 AFC Women's Asian Cup quarter-final winners	14 March 2026	5	2023	4	Round of 16 (2015)
Japan	2026 AFC Women's Asian Cup quarter-final winners	15 March 2026	10	2023	10	Champions (2011)
Philippines	2026 AFC Women's Asian Cup play-in winners	19 March 2026	2	2023	2	Group stage (2023)
North Korea	2026 AFC Women's Asian Cup play-in winners	19 March 2026	5	2011	1	Quarter-finals (2007)
New Zealand	OFC qualification winners	15 April 2026	7	2023	6	Group stage (1991, 2007, 2011, 2015, 2019, 2023)
Germany	UEFA qualification Group A4 winners	5 June 2026	10	2023	10	Champions (2003, 2007)
Argentina	2025–26 CONMEBOL Women's Nations League runners-up	5 June 2026	5	2023	3	Group stage (2003, 2007, 2019, 2023)
Colombia	2025–26 CONMEBOL Women's Nations League winners	5 June 2026	4	2023	2	Quarter-finals (2023)
Denmark	UEFA qualification Group A1 winners	9 June 2026	6	2023	2	Quarter-finals (1991, 1995)
Spain	UEFA qualification Group A3 winners	9 June 2026	4	2023	4	Champions (2023)
France	UEFA qualification Group A2 winners	9 June 2026	6	2023	5	Fourth place (2011)
Algeria	2026 Women's Africa Cup of Nations quarter-final winners	8 August 2026	1	—	1	Debut
Morocco	2026 Women's Africa Cup of Nations quarter-final winners	8 August 2026	2	2023	2	Round of 16 (2023)
Cameroon	2026 Women's Africa Cup of Nations quarter-final winners	9 August 2026	3	2019	1	Round of 16 (2015, 2019)
Malawi	2026 Women's Africa Cup of Nations quarter-final winners	9 August 2026	1	—	1	Debut

== Qualification process ==
=== Summary of qualification ===
FIFA's confederations organise their qualifications either through continental championships or separate qualifying competitions. Hosts Brazil qualified automatically for the tournament, and all eligible remaining FIFA member associations could enter qualification if they chose to do so.

Qualifying matches began on 19 February 2025 and are scheduled to end in February 2027.

Confederation	Direct slots	Play-off slots	Teams started	Teams eliminated	Teams can still qualify	Teams qualified	Qualifying start date	Qualifying next match date	Qualifying end date
AFC	6	2	38	30	2	6	23 June 2025	—N/a	19 March 2026
CAF	4	2	37	31	2	4	19 February 2025	—N/a	13 August 2026
CONCACAF	4	2	31	23	8	0	27 November 2025	27 November 2026	2 December 2026
CONMEBOL	2+1 (host)	2	9+1 (host)	5	2	2+1	24 October 2025	—N/a	9 June 2026
OFC	1	1	11	9	1	1	28 November 2025	—N/a	15 April 2026
UEFA	11	1	53	33	16	4	3 March 2026	1 December 2026	5 December 2026
Play-offs	3	—N/a	(10)	0	(10)	0	28 November 2026	28 November 2026	February 2027
Total	31+1 (host)	10	179+1 (host)	131	31	17+1	19 February 2025	27 November 2026	February 2027

=== Suspensions and withdrawals ===
Russia were suspended indefinitely on 28 February 2022 from participating in UEFA and FIFA competitions due to their country's invasion of Ukraine. The suspension was still in effect when UEFA finalised its qualifying process, and Russia were excluded from European qualification.

Congo withdrew prior to playing any matches, citing a lack of preparation.

Chad withdrew prior to playing any matches, citing delays in the disbursement process of the funds needed for match preparations and a lack of funding.

== Confederation qualification ==
FIFA retained the slot allocation from the previous edition. Brazil automatically qualified as hosts, and they took one of the slots allocated to CONMEBOL.

=== AFC ===
As in 2023, the AFC Women's Asian Cup served as the qualifying competition to determine the Asian representatives at the Women's World Cup. The qualifying process was as follows:

- Qualifying stage: Nations were drawn into eight groups of four or five teams to determine the eight nations joining the three top-ranked teams from the 2022 edition (China, South Korea and Japan) and hosts Australia for the final tournament. Groups B–H competed from 23 June – 5 July 2025, while Group A was postponed until 7–19 July due to the Twelve-Day War.
- Final tournament: The final tournament took place from 1–21 March 2026. Twelve nations were drawn into groups of four teams each to play single round-robin matches. The group winners and runners-up and the two best-ranked third-place teams advanced to the knockout phase. The four quarter-final winners qualified directly for the 2027 Women's World Cup, while the four quarter-final losers competed to determine the final two direct qualifiers, and the two Asian representatives in the inter-confederation play-offs.

==== Final positions (Women's Asian Cup knockout stage) ====
Quarter-finals
14 March – Sydney (SA)
South Korea	6
Uzbekistan	0
15 March – Sydney (SA)
Japan	7
Philippines	0
14 March – Perth (PRS)
China (a.e.t.)	2
Chinese Taipei	0
13 March – Perth (PRS)
Australia	2
North Korea	1

Semi-finals
18 March – Sydney (SA)
South Korea	1
Japan	4
17 March – Perth (PS)
China	1
Australia	2

Final
21 March – Sydney (SA)
Japan	1
Australia	0

Play-in matches for World Cup and inter-confederation play-offs 19 March – Gold Coast
Uzbekistan	0
Philippines	2
19 March – Gold Coast
Chinese Taipei	0
North Korea	4

=== CAF ===
As in 2023, the Women's Africa Cup of Nations serves as the qualifying competition to determine the African representatives at the Women's World Cup. The qualifying process is as follows:

- Qualifying stage: Qualification for the 2026 Women's Africa Cup of Nations took place over two rounds during the international windows of 19–26 February 2025 and 22–28 October 2025. Eleven nations advanced to join hosts Morocco in the final tournament. After the conclusion of qualifying, CAF announced four teams defeated in the second round had advanced based on the FIFA Women's World Ranking.
- Final tournament: The final tournament will be held 26 July – 16 August 2026. Sixteen nations were drawn into four groups of four teams each to play single round-robin matches. The group winners and runners-up will advance to the knockout phase, with the four quarter-final winners qualifying directly for the 2027 Women's World Cup, while the four quarter-final losers will compete to determine the two African representatives in the inter-confederation play-offs.

==== Final positions (Women's Africa Cup of Nations knockout stage) ====
Quarter-finals
8 August 2026
Morocco	2
South Africa	1
9 August 2026
Cameroon	1
Nigeria	0
8 August 2026
Ivory Coast	1
Algeria	2
9 August 2026
Malawi	2
Ghana	1

Semi-finals
12 August 2026
Morocco	0 (1)
Cameroon (p)	0 (3)
12 August 2026
Algeria	1
Malawi	3

Final
16 August 2026
Cameroon	3
Malawi	0
Third place
15 August 2026
Morocco	1 (2)
Algeria	1 (3)

Play-in matches for inter-confederation play-offs 13 August 2026
South Africa	2
Nigeria	1
13 August 2026
Ivory Coast	1
Ghana	2

=== CONCACAF ===
As in 2023, the CONCACAF W Championship serves as the qualifying competition to determine the North American, Central American, and Caribbean representatives at the Women's World Cup. The qualifying process is as follows:

- Qualifying stage: Twenty-nine nations were drawn into five groups of five teams each and one group of four teams to play matches during the international windows in November/December 2025, and February/March and April 2026. The six group winners advanced to join the top two CONCACAF teams in the FIFA Women's World Ranking – Canada and the United States – for the final tournament.
- Final tournament: Eight nations will compete in a single-elimination knockout tournament in November 2026. The four quarter-final winners will qualify directly for the 2027 Women's World Cup, and the four quarter-final losers will compete to determine the two CONCACAF representatives in the inter-confederation play-offs.

==== Most recent stage (CONCACAF W Championship qualification) ====
Legend
Qualified for the 2026 CONCACAF W Championship

Group A
Pos	Team	Pld	Pts
1	Mexico	4	12
2	Puerto Rico	4	9
3	Saint Vincent and the Grenadines	4	6
4	U.S. Virgin Islands	4	3
5	Saint Lucia	4	0

Source: CONCACAF

Group D
Pos	Team	Pld	Pts
1	Haiti	4	10
2	Dominican Republic	4	8
3	Belize	4	6
4	Suriname	4	4
5	Anguilla	4	0

Source: CONCACAF

Group B
Pos	Team	Pld	Pts
1	Jamaica	4	12
2	Nicaragua	4	9
3	Guyana	4	6
4	Antigua and Barbuda	4	1
5	Dominica	4	1

Source: CONCACAF

Group E
Pos	Team	Pld	Pts
1	Panama	4	12
2	Cuba	4	7
3	Aruba	4	6
4	Curaçao	4	3
5	Saint Kitts and Nevis	4	1

Source: CONCACAF

Group C
Pos	Team	Pld	Pts
1	Costa Rica	4	12
2	Guatemala	4	9
3	Bermuda	4	6
4	Grenada	4	3
5	Cayman Islands	4	0

Source: CONCACAF

Group F
Pos	Team	Pld	Pts
1	El Salvador	3	9
2	Trinidad and Tobago	3	4
3	Honduras	3	4
4	Barbados	3	0

Source: CONCACAF

==== Next stage (CONCACAF W Championship) ====
Quarter-finals
27 November 2026 – Mansfield
United States
El Salvador
27 November 2026 – Mansfield
Jamaica
Costa Rica
28 November 2026 – Mansfield
Canada
Panama
28 November 2026 – Mansfield
Mexico
Haiti

Semi-finals
1 December 2026 – Mansfield
1 December 2026 – Mansfield

Final
5 December 2026 – Houston
Third place
5 December 2026 – Houston

Play-in matches for inter-confederation play-offs 2 December 2026 – Mansfield
2 December 2026 – Mansfield

=== CONMEBOL ===
For the first time, CONMEBOL hosted a stand-alone tournament for FIFA Women's World Cup qualification. Nine teams competed in a round-robin tournament playing four matches at home and four matches away; Brazil qualified as hosts and did not participate. The tournament was held from 24 October 2025 to 9 June 2026. Two teams qualified for the Women's World Cup and two teams advanced to the inter-confederation playoffs.

Legend
Qualify for the 2027 FIFA Women's World Cup
Advance to the inter-confederation play-offs

Pos	Team	Pld	Pts
1	Colombia (C)	8	20
2	Argentina	8	18
3	Venezuela	8	12
4	Ecuador	8	11
5	Peru	8	11
6	Paraguay	8	10
7	Chile	8	10
8	Uruguay	8	6
9	Bolivia	8	1

Source: CONMEBOL
(C) Champions

=== OFC ===
The OFC held its first stand-alone qualification tournament. The qualification format was announced on 8 August 2025:

- The four lowest-ranked teams competed in a single-elimination tournament in the Cook Islands on 28 November and 1 December 2025. The winner advanced to the second round.
- The first round winner joined the seven highest-ranked teams in the second round. In August 2025, the eight teams were divided into two groups of four teams to play a single-leg round-robin tournament between 27 February and 8 March 2026. The group winners and runners-up advanced to the third round.
- The four teams advancing from the second round competed in a single-elimination tournament between 12 and 15 April 2026. The winner qualified for the 2027 FIFA Women's World Cup, and the runner-up advanced to the inter-confederation play-offs.

==== Final positions (third round) ====
Semi-finals
11 April 2026
Papua New Guinea	1
American Samoa	0
11 April 2026
New Zealand	5
Fiji	0

Final
15 April 2026
Papua New Guinea	0
New Zealand	1

=== UEFA ===
As in 2023, UEFA is holding a stand-alone qualification tournament to determine the European representatives at the Women's World Cup. The qualifying process is as follows:

- League phase: Fifty-three nations were divided into three leagues based on the 2025 UEFA Women's Nations League overall phase ranking. Each league consisted of groups of three or four teams playing a league format from 3 March to 9 June 2026. Four teams qualified directly for the 2027 Women's World Cup and 32 advanced to the play-off phase.
- Play-off phase: Thirty-two teams will play two rounds of home-and-away elimination matches to determine the final seven European nations qualifying directly for the Women's World Cup and the European representative in the inter-confederation play-offs. Round 1 matches will be held in October 2026 with round 2 matches in November and December 2026.

==== Final positions (league phase) ====
Legend
Qualified for the 2027 FIFA Women's World Cup
Advanced to the UEFA play-offs

Group A1
Pos	Team	Pld	Pts
1	Denmark	6	14
2	Italy	6	9
3	Sweden	6	8
4	Serbia (R)	6	1

Source: UEFA
(R) Relegated

Group A2
Pos	Team	Pld	Pts
1	France	6	13
2	Netherlands	6	11
3	Republic of Ireland	6	9
4	Poland (R)	6	1

Source: UEFA
(R) Relegated

Group A3
Pos	Team	Pld	Pts
1	Spain	6	15
2	England	6	15
3	Iceland	6	6
4	Ukraine (R)	6	0

Source: UEFA
(R) Relegated

Group A4
Pos	Team	Pld	Pts
1	Germany	6	16
2	Norway	6	12
3	Austria	6	4
4	Slovenia (R)	6	3

Source: UEFA
(R) Relegated

Group B1
Pos	Team	Pld	Pts
1	Wales (P)	6	14
2	Czech Republic	6	11
3	Albania	6	7
4	Montenegro (R)	6	1

Source: UEFA
(P) Promoted;
(R) Relegated

Group B2
Pos	Team	Pld	Pts
1	Switzerland (P)	6	16
2	Turkey	6	13
3	Northern Ireland	6	6
4	Malta (R)	6	0

Source: UEFA
(P) Promoted;
(R) Relegated

Group B3
Pos	Team	Pld	Pts
1	Portugal (P)	6	15
2	Finland	6	15
3	Slovakia (R)	6	6
4	Latvia (R)	6	0

Source: UEFA
(P) Promoted;
(R) Relegated

Group B4
Pos	Team	Pld	Pts
1	Scotland (P)	6	14
2	Belgium	6	14
3	Israel (R)	6	6
4	Luxembourg (R)	6	0

Source: UEFA
(P) Promoted;
(R) Relegated

Group C1
Pos	Team	Pld	Pts
1	Lithuania (P)	6	11
2	Bosnia and Herzegovina	6	11
3	Estonia	6	11
4	Liechtenstein	6	0

Source: UEFA
(P) Promoted

Group C2
Pos	Team	Pld	Pts
1	Kosovo (P)	6	15
2	Croatia	6	15
3	Bulgaria	6	6
4	Gibraltar	6	0

Source: UEFA
(P) Promoted

Group C3
Pos	Team	Pld	Pts
1	Hungary (P)	6	16
2	Azerbaijan	6	12
3	North Macedonia	6	6
4	Andorra	6	1

Source: UEFA
(P) Promoted

Group C4
Pos	Team	Pld	Pts
1	Greece (P)	4	12
2	Faroe Islands	4	6
3	Georgia	4	0

Source: UEFA
(P) Promoted

Group C5
Pos	Team	Pld	Pts
1	Romania (P)	4	10
2	Moldova	4	5
3	Cyprus	4	1

Source: UEFA
(P) Promoted

Group C6
Pos	Team	Pld	Pts
1	Belarus (P)	4	9
2	Kazakhstan	4	7
3	Armenia	4	1

Source: UEFA
(P) Promoted

League C runners-up table legend
Advanced to the UEFA play-offs

Ranking of League C runners-up
Pos	Team (Note: Due to differing group sizes, results against fourth-place teams were not considered when ranking runners-up.)	Pld	Pts
1	Croatia	4	9
2	Kazakhstan	4	7
3	Azerbaijan	4	6
4	Faroe Islands	4	6
5	Moldova	4	5
6	Bosnia and Herzegovina	4	5

Source: UEFA

==== Most recent stage (play-offs round 1) ====
Path 1
Team 1	Agg.	Team 2	1st leg	2nd leg
Lithuania	0–15	Sweden	0–5	0–10
Romania	0–8	Norway	0–2	0–6
Greece	1–8	England	1–3	0–5
Croatia	0–9	Iceland	0–4	0–5
Kazakhstan	0–12	Republic of Ireland	0–8	0–4
Kosovo	1–6	Austria	1–2	0–4
Hungary	0–11	Netherlands	0–8	0–3
Belarus	1–3	Italy	0–2	1–1

Path 2
Team 1	Agg.	Team 2	1st leg	2nd leg
Albania	0–4	Wales	0–1	0–3
Turkey	3–5	Slovenia	3–3	0–2
Slovakia	1–4	Ukraine	1–3	0–1
Israel	3–9	Switzerland	3–7	0–2
Belgium	3–3 (3–4 p)	Poland	1–0	2–3 (a.e.t.)
Czech Republic	2–5	Scotland	0–2	2–3
Northern Ireland	1–7	Portugal	0–4	1–3
Finland	6–2	Serbia	3–1	3–1

==== Next stage (play-offs round 2) ====
Team 1	Agg.	Team 2	1st leg	2nd leg
Ukraine		England	1 Dec	5 Dec
Finland		Italy	1 Dec	5 Dec
Portugal		Iceland	1 Dec	5 Dec
Wales		Norway	1 Dec	5 Dec
Switzerland		Austria	1 Dec	5 Dec
Scotland		Sweden	1 Dec	5 Dec
Poland		Republic of Ireland	1 Dec	5 Dec
Slovenia		Netherlands	1 Dec	5 Dec

== Inter-confederation play-offs ==
Ten teams will advance to a play-off tournament to determine the final three teams to qualify for the Women's World Cup: two teams each from AFC, CAF, CONCACAF, and CONMEBOL, and one team each from OFC and UEFA. Two rounds of matches will take place, with the teams from CONCACAF and UEFA receiving a bye based on the results of the 2023 play-offs and the CONMEBOL team ranked higher in the FIFA Women's World Ranking receiving a bye based on Brazil hosting the final tournament. The lower-ranked team from CONMEBOL and the teams from AFC, CAF, and OFC will play a series of matches in November–December 2026 with the top two teams advancing to the second round. The second round will consist of three single-elimination matches in February 2027 with teams from the same confederation barred from facing each other. The winners of these matches will qualify for the final tournament.

=== Next stage (preliminary phase) ===
Legend
Advance to the final phase

Pos	Team	Pld	Pts
1	Uzbekistan	0	0
2	South Africa	0	0
3	Papua New Guinea	0	0
4	Chinese Taipei	0	0
5	Ghana	0	0
6	Ecuador	0	0

First match(es) will be played: 28 November 2026.
Source: FIFA

== Top goalscorers ==
There have been 1,706 goals scored in 452 matches, for an average of 3.77 goals per match (as of 13 October 2026). Players highlighted in bold are still active in the competition.

13 goals

- (Mexico) **Charlyn Corral**
- (North Korea) Kim Kyong-yong

12 goals

- (Costa Rica) **Priscila Chinchilla**

11 goals

- (Scotland) **Caroline Weir**

10 goals

- (North Korea) Myong Yu-jong

9 goals

- (Jamaica) **Khadija Shaw**
- (Nepal) Sabitra Bhandari
- (Puerto Rico) Jill Aguilera

8 goals

- (Belgium) Tessa Wullaert

7 goals

- (Uzbekistan) **Nilufar Kudratova**

6 goals

- (Israel) Vital Kats
- (Lithuania) Rimantė Jonušaitė
- (Paraguay) Claudia Martínez
- (Portugal) **Kika Nazareth**
- (Uzbekistan) **Diyorakhon Khabibullaeva**
- (Wales) **Hannah Cain**

Below are goalscorer lists for all confederations:

- AFC Women's Asian Cup
  - qualification
  - tournament
- Women's Africa Cup of Nations
  - qualification
  - tournament
- CONCACAF W Championship
  - qualification
- CONMEBOL
- OFC
- UEFA

== See also ==
- 2026 FIFA World Cup qualification
