= 2026 CONCACAF W Championship =

North American association football competition

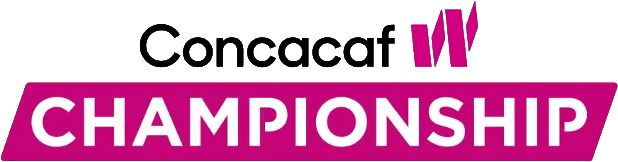

Tournament details
- Host country: United States
- Dates: 27 November – 5 December 2026
- Teams: 8
- Venues: 2 (in 2 host cities)

The 2026 CONCACAF W Championship will be the 12th edition of the CONCACAF W Championship, the quadrennial international women's football championship contested by the senior women's national teams of the member associations of CONCACAF, the regional governing body of North America, Central America, and the Caribbean. Eight teams will play in the tournament, and will be held in the United States from 27 November to 5 December 2026. The tournament will serve as the CONCACAF qualifiers to the 2027 FIFA Women's World Cup in Brazil. The top four teams will qualify for the World Cup, while two additional teams will advance to a play-off tournament.

Originally, only the two finalists would have qualified for the 2028 Summer Olympics in Los Angeles; had the United States—already qualified as hosts—been one of the finalists, then the winner of the third-place match would also have qualified. After the FIFA Council's official announcement on 17 December 2025 of the number of spots distributed for confederations, which gave CONCACAF three spots, the winner of the third-place match will now also qualify; should the United States reach the semi-finals, the other three semi-finalists will be guaranteed qualification.

The United States are the three-time defending champions of the competition, having won the 2014, 2018 and 2022 tournaments.

== Format ==
Eight teams will play in the tournament, which will be held in November 2026. They will play a single-elimination tournament consisting of quarter-finals, play-ins (between the losers of the quarter-finals), semi-finals, a third place match and a final. The competition will qualify four CONCACAF teams for the 2027 FIFA Women's World Cup in Brazil, while two teams will advance to the inter-confederation play-offs. In addition, three teams will qualify for the 2028 Summer Olympics in Los Angeles.

== Qualification ==
The two highest-ranked teams from CONCACAF in the FIFA Women's World Ranking of 7 August 2025 received a bye to the final tournament. Twenty-nine teams were drawn into five groups of five teams each and one group of four teams to play single round-robin matches during the international windows of November–December 2025, and February–March and April 2026. The six group winners advanced to the final tournament.

Team	Method of qualification	Date of qualification	Finals appearance	Last appearance	FIFA ranking at start of event	Previous best performance
United States	CONCACAF highest-ranked in FIFA ranking	7 August 2025 (Note: CONCACAF confirmed the automatic qualifiers on 7 August 2025, based on the CONCACAF women's ranking published on 11 March 2024. On 14 August 2025, CONCACAF re-allocated the seedings based on the FIFA Women's World Ranking of August 2025.)	11th	2022	2	Champions (1991, 1993, 1994, 2000, 2002, 2006, 2014, 2018, 2022)
Canada	CONCACAF next highest-ranked in FIFA ranking	7 August 2025	11th	2022	9	Champions (1998, 2010)
El Salvador	Qualification Group F winner	17 April 2026	1st	—N/a	78	Debut
Haiti	Qualification Group D winner	17 April 2026	7th	2022	48	Fourth place (1991)
Panama	Qualification Group E winner	17 April 2026	5th	2022	54	Fourth place (2018)
Costa Rica	Qualification Group C winner	18 April 2026	9th	2022	41	Runners-up (2014)
Jamaica	Qualification Group B winner	18 April 2026	8th	2022	40	Third place (2018, 2022)
Mexico	Qualification Group A winner	18 April 2026	11th	2022	28	Runners-up (1998, 2010)

== Venues ==
Location of the host cities of the 2026 CONCACAF W Championship.

The venues were announced by CONCACAF on April 21, 2026. Texas Health Mansfield Stadium in Mansfield, and Shell Energy Stadium in Houston, both in the state of Texas, will host the competition, with Houston hosting the third-place match and the final, with Mansfield hosting all other matches.

Mansfield, Texas	Houston, Texas
Texas Health Mansfield Stadium	Shell Energy Stadium
Capacity: 7,000	Capacity: 22,039

== Knockout stage ==
The tournament schedule, without kick-off times, was announced on 21 April 2026.

All times are local, CST (UTC−6).

The four quarter-final winners will qualify directly for the 2027 Women's World Cup, while the four quarter-final losers will compete in play-in matches to determine the two CONCACAF representatives in the inter-confederation play-offs. In addition, the top three teams, and, if United States is one of them, the fourth-place team, will qualify for the 2028 Summer Olympics.

=== Seeding ===
All teams were seeded according to the FIFA Women's World Ranking released 21 April 2026. The quarter-finals will feature the first- and eighth-seeded teams, the second- and seventh-seeded teams, the third- and sixth-seeded teams, and the fourth- and fifth-seeded teams facing off.

Qualified teams (Note: The number in parentheses indicates the FIFA Women's World Ranking of 21 April 2026.)
1. United States (2)
2. Canada (9)
3. Mexico (27)
4. Jamaica (41)
5. Costa Rica (42)
6. Haiti (49)
7. Panama (56)
8. El Salvador (78)

=== Bracket ===
Quarter-finals
27 November 2026 – Mansfield
United States
El Salvador
27 November 2026 – Mansfield
Jamaica
Costa Rica
28 November 2026 – Mansfield
Canada
Panama
28 November 2026 – Mansfield
Mexico
Haiti

Semi-finals
1 December 2026 – Mansfield
1 December 2026 – Mansfield

Final
5 December 2026 – Houston
Third place
5 December 2026 – Houston

Play-in matches for inter-confederation play-offs 2 December 2026 – Mansfield
2 December 2026 – Mansfield

=== Quarter-finals ===
The winners will qualify for the 2027 FIFA Women's World Cup.

27 November 2026
16ː00

Jamaica	v	Costa Rica
	Report

Texas Health Mansfield Stadium, Mansfield

27 November 2026
19ː30

United States	v	El Salvador
	Report

Texas Health Mansfield Stadium, Mansfield

28 November 2026
12ː00

Canada	v	Panama
	Report

Texas Health Mansfield Stadium, Mansfield

28 November 2026
15ː30

Mexico	v	Haiti
	Report

Texas Health Mansfield Stadium, Mansfield

=== Play-in matches ===
The winners will advance to the inter-confederation play-offs.

2 December 2026
12ː00

v

Texas Health Mansfield Stadium, Mansfield

2 December 2026
15ː30

v

Texas Health Mansfield Stadium, Mansfield

=== Semi-finals ===
The winners will qualify for the 2028 Summer Olympics. If the United States is one of the semi-finalists, then all semi-finalists will qualify for the 2028 Summer Olympics.

1 December 2026
16ː00

v

Texas Health Mansfield Stadium, Mansfield

1 December 2026
19ː30

v

Texas Health Mansfield Stadium, Mansfield

=== Third place ===
If the United States is not one of the semi-finalists, then only the winners will qualify for the 2028 Summer Olympics.

5 December 2026
14ː00

v

Shell Energy Stadium, Houston

=== Final ===
5 December 2026
17ː30

v

Shell Energy Stadium, Houston

== Qualification for international tournaments ==
=== Qualified teams for FIFA Women's World Cup ===
The following four teams from CONCACAF will qualify for the 2027 FIFA Women's World Cup in Brazil. Two more teams may qualify via the inter-confederation play-offs.

Team	Qualified on	Previous appearances in FIFA Women's World Cup (Note: Bold indicates champions for that year. Italic indicates hosts for that year.)
TBD	27 November 2026	
TBD	27 November 2026	
TBD	28 November 2026	
TBD	28 November 2026	

=== Qualified teams for 2028 Summer Olympics ===
The following four teams from CONCACAF will qualify for the 2028 Summer Olympic women's football tournament in the United States, including United States, who qualified as hosts.

Team	Qualified on	Previous appearances in Summer Olympics (Note: Bold indicates champions for that year. Italic indicates hosts for that year.)
United States	13 September 2017	8 (**1996**, 2000, **2004**, **2008**, **2012**, 2016, 2020, **2024**)
TBD	November/December 2026	
TBD	November/December 2026	
TBD	November/December 2026	
