= Saki Matsunaga =

Taiwanese footballer (born 1995)

Saki Matsunaga (Japanese: 松永 早姫; Chinese: 松永早姬; born 26 December 1995) is a footballer who plays as a midfielder for Hang Yuan FC. Born in Japan, she is a Chinese Taipei international.

== Early life ==
Matsunaga was born on 26 December 1995 in Chiba Prefecture, Japan. Of Taiwanese descent through her grandmother, she started playing football at the age of three. Growing up, she attended Shutoku Junior and Senior High School in Japan.

== Club career ==
Matsunaga played for Japanese side Ehime FC. Following her stint there, she signed for Taiwanese side Hang Yuan FC ahead of the 2024 season.

== International career ==
Matsunaga became a naturalized citizen of Taiwan in January 2025, making her eligible to play for Chinese Taipei. During the spring of 2026, she played for the Chinese Taipei women's national football team at the 2026 AFC Women's Asian Cup.

=== International goals ===
No.	Date	Venue	Opponent	Score	Result	Competition
1.	3 June 2025	Rizal Memorial Stadium, Manila, Philippines	Philippines	1–0	1–0	Friendly
2.	2 July 2025	Sport Centre Kelapa Dua Stadium, Tangerang, Indonesia	Kyrgyzstan	3–0	3–0	2026 AFC Women's Asian Cup qualification
3.	5 June 2026	GFA National Training Center, Dededo, Guam	Northern Mariana Islands	2–0	5–0	2028 EAFF E-1 Football Championship
4.	5 June 2026	GFA National Training Center, Dededo, Guam	Northern Mariana Islands	5–0	5–0	2028 EAFF E-1 Football Championship

== Style of play ==
Matsunaga plays as a midfielder. Japanese news website Gekisaka wrote in 2025 that "while she primarily played as a fullback in Japan, her main position in Taiwan is midfielder".
