= Chinese Taipei women's national football team =

Chinese Taipei
- Nickname(s): Mulan; Blue Magpies
- Association: Chinese Taipei Football Association
- Confederation: AFC (Asia)
- Sub-confederation: EAFF (East Asia)
- Head coach: Patrick De Wilde
- Captain: Ting Chi
- FIFA code: TPE
First colours	Second colours

FIFA ranking
- Current: 38 ▲2 (20 October 2026)
- Highest: 22 (July – October 2003)
- Lowest: 43 (March 2012; August – December 2012)

First international
- Taiwan 5–0 Indonesia (Taipei, Republic of China; 2 August 1977)

Biggest win
- Chinese Taipei 16–0 Malaysia (Iloilo, Philippines; 7 November 1999); Macau 0–16 Chinese Taipei (Zhuhai, China; 30 November 2023)

Biggest defeat
- Norway 12–1 Chinese Taipei (Philadelphia, United States; 2 August 1995); Chinese Taipei 0–11 Japan (Ho Chi Minh City, Vietnam; 31 March 2008)

World Cup
- Appearances: 1 (first in 1991)
- Best result: Quarter-finals (1991)

Asian Cup
- Appearances: 14 (first in 1977)
- Best result: Winners (1977, 1980, 1981)

OFC Nations Cup
- Appearances: 2 (first in 1986)
- Best result: Winners (1986, 1989)
Medal record
Women's football
Asian Games
Bronze medal – third place	1994 Hiroshima	Team
AFC Women's Asian Cup
Gold medal – first place	1977 Republic of China
Gold medal – first place	1980 India
Gold medal – first place	1981 Hong Kong
Silver medal – second place	1989 Hong Kong
Silver medal – second place	1999 Philippines
OFC Women's Nations Cup
Gold medal – first place	1986 New Zealand
Gold medal – first place	1989 Australia
ASEAN Women's Championship
Silver medal – second place	2006 Vietnam

The Chinese Taipei women's national football team (Chinese: 中華台北女子足球代表隊) represents Taiwan (Republic of China) in international women's football and is controlled by the Chinese Taipei Football Association, the governing body for football in Taiwan.

== History ==
=== Under the Asian Ladies Football Confederation ===
A women's national football team was form to represent Taiwan in the mid-1970s. Taiwan was among the founding members of the now defunct Asian Ladies Football Confederation (ALFC) along with Hong Kong, Malaysia, and Singapore in 1968. Republic of China debuted at the Asian Women's Championship in 1977 which it won. They were also the champions at the 1980 and 1981 editions.

However China (People's Republic of China) having successfully petitioned the Asian Football Confederation to ban Taiwan to compete under the name of "Republic of China" due to its One China policy in 1974, have also applied pressure to the ALFC. In 1981, the Republic of China FA was renamed as the Chinese Taipei Football Association (CTFA). For the 1981 Asian Women's Championship, the ALFC convinced Taiwan to compete under the name Mulan Taipei. The ALFC within the 1980s was absorbed into the AFC.

=== Oceania representatives ===
Taiwan, now Chinese Taipei, briefly moved to the Oceania Football Confederation (OFC). They won the 1986 and 1989 OFC Women's Championships.

=== Readmission to the AFC ===
Chinese Taipei were re-admitted to the AFC in 1989. Chinese Taipei is among the three Asian teams which qualified in the inaugural FIFA Women's World Cup in 1991 along with Japan and host China.

It also took part at the Women's World Invitational Tournament which was organized by Taiwan's football federation from 1978 to 1987.

The team have also continued to compete in the Asian Women's Championship (later known as the AFC Women's Asian Cup) since its return to the AFC, finishing no lower than fourth until 1999. However, after 1999, Chinese Taipei has failed to finish in the podium in succeeding editions and even not qualified from 2010 and 2018.

Chinese Taipei returned to the AFC Women's Asian Cup in 2022. They reached the quarterfinals, losing to the Philippines via a shootout and consequentially missing qualification for the 2023 FIFA Women's World Cup.

== Team image ==
=== Nicknames ===
The Chinese Taipei women's national football team has been known or nicknamed as "Mulan". The nickname was adopted by the national federation during the tenure of then-chairman General Cheng Wei-yuan in 1975 after the Chinese folk heroine Hua Mulan. After the Chinese Taipei Football Association adopted a new logo featuring a Formosan blue magpie in the 2010s, the Blue Magpies has also been used as an unofficial moniker.

=== Kits and crest ===
Home 2013	Away 2013	Home 2014	Away 2014	Home 2015	Away 2015	Home 2019	Away 2019

== FIFA World Ranking ==
As of 03 June 2024, after the match against Bangladesh.

Best Ranking Best Mover Worst Ranking Worst Mover

Chinese Taipei's FIFA World Ranking History
Rank	Year	Games Played	Won	Lost	Drawn	Best		Worst	
Rank	Year	Games Played	Won	Lost	Drawn	Rank	Move	Rank	Move
38 ▲2 (20 October 2026)	2022	5	2	2	1	39	0	39	0
39	2021	0	0	0	0	39	▲1	40	▼1

== Results and fixtures ==
The following is a list of match results in the last 12 months, as well as any future matches that have been scheduled.

Legend

Win Draw Lose Fixture

=== 2025 ===
29 November Friendly	Indonesia	0–5	Chinese Taipei	Yogyakarta, Indonesia
19:30 UTC+7		Report	Nottet 35' (o.g.); Pu Hsin-Hui 42'; Gea 70' (o.g.); Chen Yu-Chin 75'; Hsu Yi-Yun 87'	Stadium: Maguwoharjo Stadium

2 December Friendly	Nepal	0–1	Chinese Taipei	Yogyakarta, Indonesia
19:30 UTC+7		Report	Huang Ke-Sin 53'	Stadium: Maguwoharjo Stadium

=== 2026 ===
4 March AFC Women's Asian Cup GS	Japan	2–0	Chinese Taipei	Perth, Australia
13:00 UTC+8	Tanikawa 61'; Seike 90+2'	Report (AFC); Report (FIFA)		Stadium: Perth Rectangular Stadium; Attendance: 1,223; Referee: Oh Hyeon-jeong (South Korea)

7 March AFC Women's Asian Cup GS	Chinese Taipei	1–0	Vietnam	Perth, Australia
13:00 UTC+8	Su Yu-Hsuan 26'	Report (AFC); Report (FIFA)		Stadium: Perth Rectangular Stadium; Attendance: 1,784; Referee: Lara Lee (Australia)

10 March AFC Women's Asian Cup GS	India	1–3	Chinese Taipei	Sydney, Australia
20:00 UTC+11	Kalyan 39'	Report (AFC); Report (FIFA)	Su Yu-hsuan 12'; Elangbam 45+8' (o.g.); Chen Yu-chin 77'	Stadium: Western Sydney Stadium; Attendance: 3,648; Referee: Casey Reibelt (Australia)

14 March 2026 AFC Women's Asian Cup knockout stage	China	2–0	Chinese Taipei	Perth, Australia
13:00 UTC+8	Shao Ziqin 94'; Chen Ying-hui 118' (o.g.)	Report (AFC); Report (FIFA)		Stadium: Perth Rectangular Stadium; Attendance: 5,238; Referee: Oh Hyeon-jeong (South Korea)

19 March AFC Women's Asian Cup Play In	North Korea	4–0	Chinese Taipei	Gold Coast, Australia
19:00 UTC+10	Hong Song-ok 32', 49', 68'; Kim Kyong-yong 52'	Report (AFC); Report (FIFA)		Stadium: Gold Coast Stadium; Attendance: 2,684; Referee: Asaka Koizumi (Japan)

5 June EAFF E-1 Football Championship Preliminary round	Chinese Taipei	5–0	Northern Mariana Islands	Dededo, Guam
19:15 UTC+10	Hsu Yi-yun 12'; Matsunaga 16', 66'; Su Yu-hsuan 58'; Chen Ying-hui 62'	Report		Stadium: GFA National Training Center; Attendance: 175; Referee: Pansa Chaisanit (Thailand)

7 June EAFF E-1 Football Championship Preliminary round	Northern Mariana Islands	0–13	Chinese Taipei	Dededo, Guam
14:30 UTC+10		Report	Liu Yu-chiao 1', 41'; Huang Ke-sin 13'; Wu Kai-ching 17', 45'; Chang Chi-lan 49', 62', 75'; He Jia-shuan 60', 64', 83'; Chen Ying-hui 67' (pen.); Li Yi-wen 90'	Stadium: GFA National Training Center; Attendance: 75; Referee: Sugino Azusa (Japan)

9 June EAFF E-1 Football Championship Preliminary round Final	South Korea	5–3 (a.e.t.)	Chinese Taipei	Dededo, Guam
18:00 UTC+10	Yun Su-jeong 50', 105'; Kim Hye-ri 53' (pen.); Jang Sel-gi 114'; Jeong Yu-jin 120'	Report (EAFF)	Hsu Yi-yun 54'; Chen Jin-wen 61'; Li Yi-wen 106'	Stadium: GFA National Training Center; Referee: Koizumi Asaka (Japan)

14 September 2026 Asian Games GS	Chinese Taipei	2–1	Vietnam	Fukuroi, Japan
16:00 UTC+9	Su Yu-hsuan 16'; Wakabayashi 81'	Report	Nguyễn Thị Thanh Nhã 86'	Stadium: Shizuoka Stadium; Attendance: 352; Referee: Park Se-jin (South Korea)

17 September 2026 Asian Games GS	Thailand	0–1	Chinese Taipei	Fukuroi, Japan
16:00 UTC+9		Report	Tanaka 78'	Stadium: Shizuoka Stadium; Attendance: 277; Referee: Rawdha Al-Mansoori (United Arab Emirates)

21 September 2026 Asian Games GS	Japan	4–0	Chinese Taipei	Fukuroi, Japan
19:30 UTC+9	Takarada 7' (pen.); Kamiya 20'; Ueno 51'; Ikuta 58'	Report		Stadium: Shizuoka Stadium; Attendance: 3,679; Referee: Khin Nyein Chan (Myanmar)

25 September 2026 Asian Games QF	North Korea	5–1	Chinese Taipei	Fukuroi, Japan
15:00 UTC+9	Song Chun-sim 21'; Myong Ju-yong 29'; Kim Kyong-yong 34'; Choe Kum-ok 64'; Kim Song-gyong 86'	Report	Chen Yu-Chin 90+2'	Stadium: Shizuoka Stadium; Attendance: 477; Referee: Veronika Bernatskaia (Kyrgyzstan)

28 November 2027 FIFA Women's World Cup qualification	Chinese Taipei	–	South Africa	Salé, Morocco
14:00 UTC+0				Stadium: Mohammed VI Football Academy

1 December 2027 FIFA Women's World Cup qualification	Papua New Guinea	–	Chinese Taipei	Salé, Morocco
14:00 UTC+0				Stadium: Mohammed VI Football Academy

5 December 2027 FIFA Women's World Cup qualification	Chinese Taipei	–	Ecuador	Salé, Morocco
17:00 UTC+0				Stadium: Mohammed VI Football Academy

=== 2027 ===
19 April 2028 Olympic Qualifiers	Chinese Taipei	v	Australia	Taiwan
		Report

24 April 2028 Olympic Qualifiers	Uzbekistan	v	Chinese Taipei	Uzbekistan
		Report

7 October 2028 Olympic Qualifiers	Japan	v	Chinese Taipei	Japan
		Report

12 October 2028 Olympic Qualifiers	Chinese Taipei	v	Japan	Taiwan
		Report

29 November 2028 Olympic Qualifiers	Australia	v	Chinese Taipei	Australia
		Report

4 December 2028 Olympic Qualifiers	Chinese Taipei	v	Uzbekistan	Taiwan
		Report

- "Fixtures and Results". Soccerway.

== All-time results ==
- The following table shows Chinese Taipei women's all-time international record, correct as of 16 July 2025.

Against	Played	Won	Drawn	Lost	GF	GA
Total	170	70	15	85	332	380

Source: Worldfootball.net

== Coaching staff ==
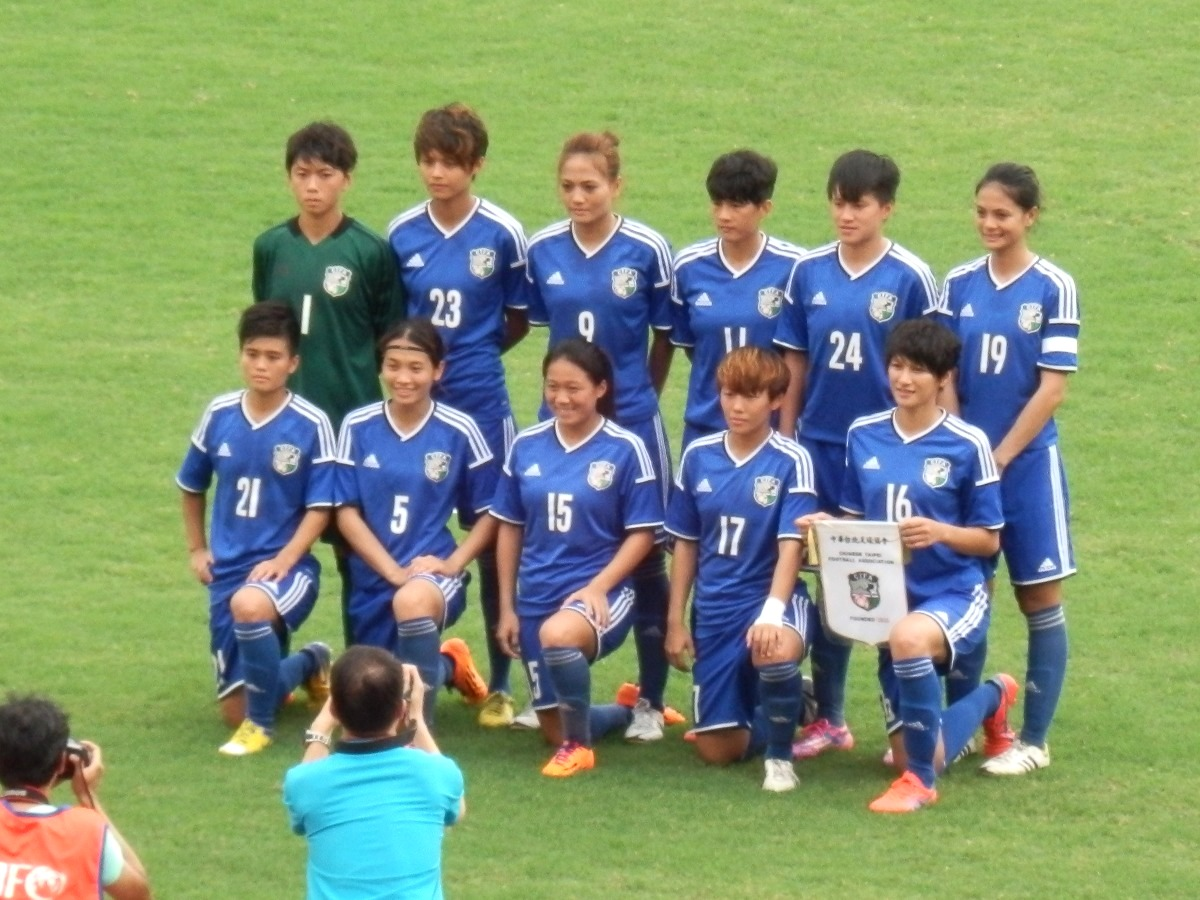
Chinese Taipei against Hong Kong at a friendly match on 30 August 2014

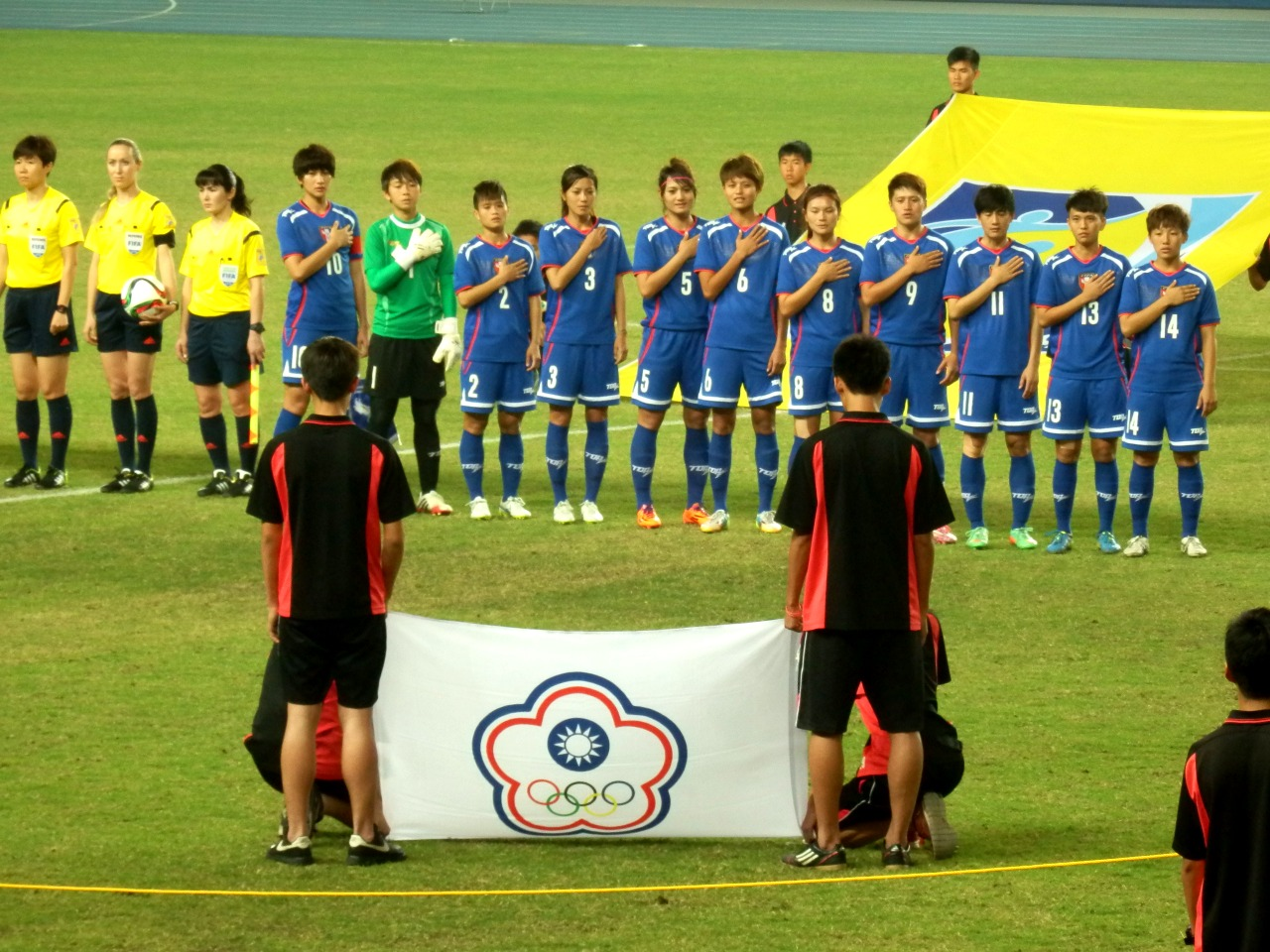
Chinese Taipei against Laos on 20 March 2015 in 2015–16 AFC Women's Olympic Qualifying Tournament

=== Current coaching staff ===
Position	Name
Head coach	(Belgium) Patrick De Wilde
Assistant coach	(Taiwan) Chuang Shu-Mei (Taiwan) Yang Chun-Yen
Goalkeeper coach	(Taiwan) Chen Yen-Fu
Fitness coach	(Taiwan) Chen Chia-Hui
Doctor	(Taiwan) Wu Chih-Kuan
Physical therapist	(Taiwan) Cheng Pei-shan
Managers	(Taiwan) Huang Yu-jun

=== Manager history ===
- (Taiwan) Chang Teng-yun (張騰雲), (1979)
- (Taiwan) Liu Jun-tse (劉潤澤), (1977)
- (Taiwan) Kao Yong (高庸), (1981, 1993, 1995–1998)
- (Taiwan) Chong Tsu-pin (張子濱), (1990–1991)
- (Taiwan) Chen Ting-hsiung (陳定雄), (1990)
- (Taiwan) Hsieh Chih-chun (謝志君), (1994)
- (Taiwan) Chang Ming-hsien (張明賢), (1999–2002)
- (Taiwan) Lu Kuei-hua (呂桂花), (2003–2005, 2008)
- (Taiwan) Chou Tai-ying (周台英), (2005–2006, 2010)
- (Japan) Toshiaki Imai (今井敏明), (2007)
- (Taiwan) Yen Shih-kai (顏士凱), (2012–2013, 2018)
- (Japan) Masayuki Nagira (柳樂雅幸), (2013–2017)
- (Japan) Kazuo Echigo (越後和男), (2019–2022)
- (Taiwan) Yen Shih-kai (顏士凱), (2022–2023)
- (Hong Kong) Chan Hiu Ming (陳曉明), (2023–2025)
- (Belgium) Patrick De Wilde (2026–)

== Players ==
=== Current squad ===
The following players were called up for the 2026 AFC Women's Asian Cup in Australia, announced by the AFC on 25 February 2026.

No.	Pos.	Player	Date of birth (age)	Caps	Goals	Club
1	GK	Wang Yu-ting	27 May 2001 (aged 24)			(Chinese Taipei Football Association) New Taipei Hang Yuen
2	DF	Chang Chi-lan	18 September 1996 (aged 29)			(Chinese Taipei Football Association) Taichung Blue Whale
3	DF	Su Sin-yun	20 November 1996 (aged 29)			(Chinese Taipei Football Association) New Taipei Hang Yuen
4	DF	Lin Yu-syuan	26 February 2003 (aged 23)			(Chinese Taipei Football Association) Taichung Blue Whale
5	DF	Pan Shin-yu	3 May 1997 (aged 28)			(Chinese Taipei Football Association) Kaohsiung Attackers
6	DF	Teng Pei-lin	6 October 2002 (aged 23)			(Chinese Taipei Football Association) New Taipei Hang Yuen
7	FW	Ting Chi	16 November 2000 (aged 25)			(Chinese Taipei Football Association) Taichung Blue Whale
8	FW	Li Yi-wen	20 September 2005 (aged 20)			(Chinese Taipei Football Association) Sunny Bank AC Taipei
9	MF	Hsu Yi-yun	29 April 1997 (aged 28)			(Chinese Taipei Football Association) Sunny Bank AC Taipei
10	MF	Saki Matsunaga	26 December 1995 (aged 30)			(Chinese Taipei Football Association) New Taipei Hang Yuen
11	FW	He Jia-shiuan	7 May 2005 (aged 20)			(Chinese Taipei Football Association) New Taipei Hang Yuen
12	DF	Pu Hsin-hui	12 September 2005 (aged 20)			(Chinese Taipei Football Association) New Taipei Hang Yuen
13	MF	Chan Pi-han	27 April 1992 (aged 33)			(Chinese Taipei Football Association) Kaohsiung Attackers
14	DF	Wu Kai-Ching	14 November 1999 (aged 26)			(Chinese Taipei Football Association) Kaohsiung Attackers
15	FW	Tseng Yun-ching	14 February 2000 (aged 26)			(Chinese Taipei Football Association) Sunny Bank AC Taipei
16	FW	Liu Yu-chiao	14 December 2005 (aged 20)			(Chinese Taipei Football Association) New Taipei Hang Yuen
17	FW	Chen Jin-wen	13 June 2003 (aged 22)			(Chinese Taipei Football Association) Kaohsiung Attackers
18	GK	Wu Hsin-ni	16 November 2005 (aged 20)			(Chinese Taipei Football Association) Valkyrie
19	FW	Su Yu-hsuan	21 February 2001 (aged 25)			(Chinese Football Association) Henan Jianye
20	DF	Chen Ying-hui (captain)	5 October 1998 (aged 27)			(Chinese Taipei Football Association) Taichung Blue Whale
21	MF	Chen Yu-chin	5 August 2007 (aged 18)			(Chinese Taipei Football Association) Kaohsiung Attackers
22	MF	Huang Ke-sin	18 July 2003 (aged 22)			(Chinese Taipei Football Association) Taichung Blue Whale
23	GK	Chiu I-hsiu	22 July 2005 (aged 20)			(Chinese Taipei Football Association) Sunny Bank AC Taipei
24	DF	Pan Yen-hsin	18 February 1996 (aged 30)			(Chinese Taipei Football Association) New Taipei Hang Yuen
25	MF	Wang Hsiang-huei	28 September 1987 (aged 38)			(Chinese Taipei Football Association) Hualien
26	FW	Yang Hsiao-chuan	23 September 2005 (aged 20)			(Chinese Taipei Football Association) Hualien

=== Recent call-ups ===
The following players have been called up to the squad in the past 12 months.

Pos.	Player	Date of birth (age)	Caps	Goals	Club	Latest call-up

=== Notable players ===
- Chou Tai-ying (周台英)
- Shieh Su-jean (謝素貞)
- Hsu Chia-cheng (許家珍)

== Records ==
*Active players in bold, statistics as of 1 October 2021.

=== Most capped players ===
#	Player	Year(s)	Caps	Goals

=== Top goalscorers ===
#	Player	Year(s)	Goals	Caps

== Honours ==
=== Major competitions ===
- **AFC Women's Asian Cup**

Champions: 1977, 1980, 1981
Runners-up: 1989, 1999

- **OFC Women's Championship**

Champions: 1986, 1989

=== Regional ===
- **AFF Women's Championship**

Runners-up: 2006

== Competitive record ==
=== FIFA Women's World Cup ===
FIFA Women's World Cup record
Host / Year	Result	Position	Pld	W	D	L	GF	GA
(China) 1991	**Quarter-finals**	8th	4	1	0	3	2	15
(Sweden) 1995	Did not qualify							
(United States) 1999	Did not qualify							
(United States) 2003	Did not qualify							
(China) 2007	Did not qualify							
(Germany) 2011	Did not qualify							
(Canada) 2015	Did not qualify							
(France) 2019	Did not qualify							
(Australia) (New Zealand) 2023	Did not qualify							
(Brazil) 2027	To be determined							
(Costa Rica) (Jamaica) (Mexico) (United States) 2031	To be determined							
(United Kingdom) 2035	To be determined							
Total:1/9	Quarter-finals	8th	4	1	0	3	2	15

FIFA Women's World Cup history
Year	Round	Date	Opponent	Result	Stadium
(China) 1991	Group stage	17 November	Italy	**L** 0–5	Jiangmen Stadium, Jiangmen
(China) 1991	Group stage	19 November	Germany	**L** 0–3	Zhongshan Stadium, Zhongshan
(China) 1991	Group stage	21 November	Nigeria	**W** 2–0	Jiangmen Stadium, Jiangmen
(China) 1991	Quarter-finals	24 November	United States	**L** 0–7	New Plaza Stadium, Foshan

=== Olympic Games ===
Summer Olympics record
Year	Result	GP	W	D	L	GF	GA	GD
(United States) 1996	Did not qualify							
(Australia) 2000	Did not qualify							
(Greece) 2004	Did not qualify							
(China) 2008	Did not qualify							
(United Kingdom) 2012	Did not qualify							
(Brazil) 2016	Did not qualify							
(Japan) 2020	Did not qualify							
(France) 2024	Did not qualify							
(United States) 2028	To be determined							
Total:0/7	–	–	–	–	–	–	–	–

=== AFC Women's Asian Cup ===
AFC Women's Asian Cup										Qualification						
Year	Result	Rank	M	W	D	L	GF	GA	GD	M	W	D	L	GF	GA	GD
(Hong Kong) 1975	Did Not Enter									No Qualification						
(Taiwan) 1977	**Champions**	**1st**	**4**	**4**	**0**	**0**	**18**	**1**	**+17**	No Qualification						
(India) 1980	**Champions**	**1st**	**7**	**6**	**1**	**0**	**19**	**0**	**+19**	No Qualification						
(Hong Kong) 1981	**Champions**	**1st**	**5**	**5**	**0**	**0**	**20**	**0**	**+20**	No Qualification						
(Thailand) 1983	Did Not Enter									No Qualification						
(Hong Kong) 1986	Did Not Enter									No Qualification						
(Hong Kong) 1989	**Runners-up**	**2nd**	**5**	**3**	**0**	**2**	**9**	**3**	**+6**	No Qualification						
(Japan) 1991	**Third place**	**3rd**	**5**	**1**	**3**	**1**	**9**	**3**	**+6**	No Qualification						
(Malaysia) 1993	**Fourth place**	**4th**	**5**	**2**	**0**	**3**	**15**	**11**	**+4**	No Qualification						
(Malaysia) 1995	**Third place**	**3rd**	**4**	**2**	**1**	**1**	**11**	**3**	**+8**	No Qualification						
(China) 1997	**Fourth place**	**4th**	**4**	**2**	**0**	**2**	**7**	**12**	**–5**	No Qualification						
(Philippines) 1999	**Runners-up**	**2nd**	**6**	**4**	**1**	**1**	**25**	**5**	**+20**	No Qualification						
(Taiwan) 2001	Group stage	5th	4	3	0	1	24	1	+23	No Qualification						
(Thailand) 2003	Group stage	7th	4	2	1	1	7	7	0	No Qualification						
(Australia) 2006	Group stage	8th	3	0	0	3	1	14	−13							
(Vietnam) 2008	Group stage	8th	3	0	0	3	0	17	−17							
(China) 2010	Did Not Qualify															
(Vietnam) 2014	Did Not Qualify															
(Jordan) 2018	Did Not Qualify															
(India) 2022	Quarter-finals	7th	5	2	1	2	10	7	+3							
(Australia) 2026	Quarter-finals	7th	5	2	0	3	4	9	-5							
Total:15/21	3 Titles		69	38	8	23	179	93	+86							

*Draws include knockout matches decided on penalty kicks.

=== OFC Women's Nations Cup ===
OFC Women's Nations Cup record
Year	Result	Position	Pld	W	D	L	GF	GA
(New Caledonia) 1983	Did not participate							
(New Zealand) 1986	**Champions**	**1st**	**4**	**4**	**0**	**0**	**8**	**2**
(Australia) 1989	**Champions**	**1st**	**5**	**4**	**0**	**1**	**15**	**3**
Total	Champions	1st	9	8	0	1	23	5

=== Asian Games ===
Asian Games record
Host / Year	Result	Rank	M	W	D	L	GF	GA	GD
(China) 1990	**Fourth place**	**4th**	**5**	**2**	**1**	**2**	**13**	**4**	**+9**
(Japan) 1994	**Bronze medal**	**3rd**	**3**	**1**	**0**	**2**	**2**	**8**	**–6**
(Thailand) 1998	**Fourth place**	**4th**	**5**	**1**	**2**	**2**	**16**	**10**	**+6**
(South Korea) 2002	Group stage	5th	5	0	1	4	2	7	−5
(Qatar) 2006	Group stage	5th	3	1	0	2	3	7	−4
(China) 2010	Did not enter								
(South Korea) 2014	Quarter-finals	7th	4	0	1	3	2	10	−8
(Indonesia) 2018	**Fourth place**	**4th**	**6**	**2**	**1**	**3**	**12**	**7**	**+5**
(China) 2022	Quarter-finals	6th	3	2	0	1	4	4	0
(Japan) 2026	**Fifth place**	5th	4	2	0	2	4	10	-6
Total	Bronze medal	3rd	38	11	6	21	58	67	-9

=== EAFF E-1 Football Championship ===
EAFF E-1 Championship record								Preliminary round					
Year	Result	Pld	W	D	L	GF	GA	Pld	W	D	L	GF	GA
(South Korea) 2005	Did not enter							Did not enter					
(China) 2008	Did not qualify							3	2	0	1	14	4
(Japan) 2010	**Fourth place**	**3**	**0**	**0**	**3**	**0**	**10**	4	3	0	1	35	7
(South Korea) 2013	Did not qualify							3	1	0	2	2	10
(China) 2015	Did not qualify							3	2	0	1	6	2
(Japan) 2017	Did not qualify							3	2	0	1	13	10
(South Korea) 2019	**Fourth place**	**3**	**0**	**0**	**3**	**0**	**13**	3	2	0	1	8	2
(Japan) 2022	**Fourth place**	**3**	**0**	**0**	**3**	**1**	**10**	—	—	—	—	—	—
(South Korea) 2025	**Fourth place**	**3**	**0**	**0**	**3**	**2**	**10**	2	2	0	0	19	0
Total	4/9	12	0	0	12	3	43	21	14	0	7	97	35

=== AFF Women's Championship ===
AFF Women's Championship record
Year	Result	Pld	W	D	L	GF	GA
Invitee
(Vietnam) 2006	**Runners-up**	3	1	1	1	4	2
Total	1/12	3	1	1	1	4	2

== See also ==
- Sport in Taiwan
  - Football in Taiwan
    - Women's football in Taiwan
- Chinese Taipei women's national under-20 football team
- Chinese Taipei women's national under-17 football team
- Chinese Taipei women's national futsal team
- Chinese Taipei men's national football team

Sporting positions
Preceded by 1983 New Zealand	OFC Women's Champions; 1986 (First title); 1989 (Second title)	Succeeded by 1991 New Zealand
Preceded by 1975 New Zealand	AFC Women's Champions; 1977 (First title); 1980 (Second title); 1981 (Third title)	Succeeded by 1983 Thailand
