= Hsu Yi-yun =

Taiwanese footballer (born 1997)

Hsu Yi-yun (Chinese: 許翊筠; born 29 April 1997) is a Taiwanese footballer who plays as a midfielder for AC Taipei.

== Early life ==
Hsu attended Fu Jen Catholic University in Taiwan.

== Club career ==
In 2019, she signed for Belgian side Moldavo. After that, she signed for Taiwanese side Hualien, where she was described as "mainly responsible for organizing passes in the midfield". In 2023, she almost signed for Chinese side Shaanxi Chang'an Athletic.

== International career ==
Hsu has been described as an "immovable core of the Chinese Women's National Team".

=== International goals ===
#	Date	Venue	Opponent	Score	Result	Competition
1.	5 April 2023	Fouad Chehab Stadium, Jounieh, Lebanon	Lebanon	1–1	5–1	2024 AFC Women's Olympic Qualifying Tournament
2.	11 April 2023	Fouad Chehab Stadium, Jounieh, Lebanon	Indonesia	2–0	4–0	2024 AFC Women's Olympic Qualifying Tournament
3.	26 October 2023	Perth Rectangular Stadium, Perth, Australia	Philippines	1–0	1–4	2024 AFC Women's Olympic Qualifying Tournament
4.	29 June 2025	Indomilk Arena, Tangerang, Indonesia	Pakistan	4–0	8–0	2026 AFC Women's Asian Cup qualification
5.	29 November 2025	Maguwoharjo Stadium, Yogyakarta, Indonesia	Indonesia	5–0	5–0	Friendly
6.	5 June 2026	GFA National Training Center, Dededo, Guam	Northern Mariana Islands	1–0	5–0	2028 EAFF E-1 Football Championship
7.	9 June 2026	GFA National Training Center, Dededo, Guam	South Korea	1–2	3–5 (a.e.t.)	2028 EAFF E-1 Football Championship

== Style of play ==
Hsu operated as an attacking midfielder before switching to a defensive midfielder while playing for the Chinese Taipei women's national football team. She has been described as having "excellent passing and control skills".

== Personal life ==
Hsu studied physiology and sports performance.
