= 2027 FIFA Women's World Cup qualification (inter-confederation play-offs) =

Play-Off Tournament for the FIFA Women's World Cup 2027

Tournament details
- Host country: Morocco (phase 1)
- Dates: 28 November–5 December 2026 (phase 1); February 2027 (phase 2)
- Teams: 10 (from 6 confederations)

The inter-confederation play-offs of the 2027 FIFA Women's World Cup qualification tournament will be played in two phases in the international windows of November–December 2026 and February 2027 to determine the final three teams to qualify for the 2027 FIFA Women's World Cup.

== Format ==
On 10 December 2024, the FIFA Council approved the slot allocation and format of the play-off tournament. On 15 April 2026, FIFA published the play-off tournament regulations.

- Preliminary phase: The preliminary phase of the inter-confederation play-offs will consist of six teams – two each from AFC and CAF, one from OFC, and the lower-ranked team from CONMEBOL according to the FIFA Women's World Ranking of 16 June 2026 – competing at a centralized venue in November–December 2026. The teams were drawn into three tiers to play a set of pre‑determined matches with teams from the same confederation barred from facing each other. The top two teams from this phase will advance to the final phase.
- Final phase: The final phase of the inter-confederation play-offs will consist of six teams – two teams advancing from the preliminary phase and four teams who received a bye: two from CONCACAF and one from UEFA (based on the results of the 2026 play-offs), and the higher-ranked team from CONMEBOL (based on Brazil hosting the final tournament) – competing in single knockout matches to determine the final three qualifiers for the 2027 FIFA Women's World Cup. Teams will be ranked according to the most recent FIFA Women's World Ranking, the three highest-ranked teams will be seeded into pathways, and the other teams will be drawn against them. Teams from the same confederation cannot be drawn into the same pathway.

== Qualified teams ==
Confederation	Qualified as	Team	Date qualified	Ref.
AFC	2026 AFC Women's Asian Cup play-in losers	Uzbekistan	19 March 2026	
AFC	2026 AFC Women's Asian Cup play-in losers	Chinese Taipei	19 March 2026	
CAF	2026 Women's Africa Cup of Nations play-in winners	Ghana	13 August 2026	
CAF	2026 Women's Africa Cup of Nations play-in winners	South Africa	13 August 2026	
CONCACAF	2026 CONCACAF W Championship play-in winners	TBD	2 December 2026	
CONCACAF	2026 CONCACAF W Championship play-in winners	TBD	2 December 2026	
CONMEBOL	2025–26 CONMEBOL Women's Nations League 3rd place	Venezuela	9 June 2026	
CONMEBOL	2025–26 CONMEBOL Women's Nations League 4th place	Ecuador	9 June 2026	
OFC	2027 FIFA Women's World Cup OFC qualifiers runners-up	Papua New Guinea	15 April 2026	
UEFA	2027 FIFA Women's World Cup qualification – UEFA play-offs lowest-ranked winners	TBD	5 December 2026	

== Preliminary phase ==
=== Draw ===
The preliminary phase draw took place on 20 August 2026 at 14:00 CEST (UTC+2), in Zürich, Switzerland. Six teams were seeded into three pots based on the FIFA Women's World Rankings of 16 June 2026 (shown in parentheses), with the two highest-ranked teams placed in pot 1, the next two highest-ranked teams in pot 2 and the remaining two teams in pot 3. Teams from the same confederation could not be drawn to play against each other. During the draw, the first team picked from pot 1 was assigned as team A1, followed by the second team as A2. The draw then continued by drawing all of the teams from pots 2 and 3. If a draw constraint prevented a team from being placed in its drawn position, it was placed in the next available position.

Draw pots (Note: Numbers in parentheses indicate FIFA ranking at the time of the draw.)
Pot 1	Pot 2	Pot 3
Chinese Taipei (40); Uzbekistan (51)	South Africa (57); Papua New Guinea (58)	Ghana (60); Ecuador (61)

=== Tiebreakers ===
During the preliminary phase, teams tied on standings points will be ranked using the following criteria:

1. higher number of points obtained in matches among the tied teams;
2. greatest goal difference obtained in matches among the tied teams;
3. greatest number of goals scored in matches among the tied teams

If teams remain tied, then criteria a–c are reapplied only to those teams that remain tied. If teams still remain tied, then the following criteria are applied only to those teams that remain tied:

4. greatest goal difference in all preliminary phase matches;
5. greatest number of goals scored in all preliminary phase matches;
6. greatest total number of points obtained by all preliminary phase opponents;
7. greatest total goal difference obtained by all preliminary phase opponents;
8. greatest total number of goals scored by all preliminary phase opponents;
9. highest team conduct score obtained by players and team officials in all league phase matches:
  1. Yellow card: –1 point;
  2. Second yellow card/indirect red card: –3 points;
  3. Direct red card: –4 points;
  4. Yellow card and direct red card: –5 points
  Only one deduction is applied to any player or team official in a single match

If teams are still tied, they will be ranked according to the most recent FIFA Women's World Ranking.

=== Summary ===
Pos	Team	Pld	W	D	L	GF	GA	GD	Pts	Qualification	(Uzbekistan)	(South Africa)	(Papua New Guinea)	(Chinese Taipei)	(Ghana)	(Ecuador)
1	Uzbekistan	0	0	0	0	0	0	0	0	Advance to final phase	—	—	28 Nov	—	1 Dec	—
2	South Africa	0	0	0	0	0	0	0	0	Advance to final phase	5 Dec	—	—	—	—	1 Dec
3	Papua New Guinea	0	0	0	0	0	0	0	0		—	—	—	1 Dec	5 Dec	—
4	Chinese Taipei	0	0	0	0	0	0	0	0		—	28 Nov	—	—	—	5 Dec
5	Ghana	0	0	0	0	0	0	0	0		—	—	—	—	—	28 Nov
6	Ecuador	0	0	0	0	0	0	0	0		—	—	—	—	—	—

First match(es) will be played: 28 November 2026. Source: FIFA
28 November 2026
14:00

Chinese Taipei	v	South Africa
	Report

Mohammed VI Football Academy (Pitch 1), Salé
28 November 2026
16:30

Uzbekistan	v	Papua New Guinea
	Report

Mohammed VI Football Academy (Pitch 2), Salé
28 November 2026
19:00

Ghana	v	Ecuador
	Report

Mohammed VI Football Academy (Pitch 3), Salé

1 December 2026
14:00

Papua New Guinea	v	Chinese Taipei
	Report

Mohammed VI Football Academy (Pitch 3), Salé
1 December 2026
16:30

Uzbekistan	v	Ghana
	Report

Mohammed VI Football Academy (Pitch 2), Salé
1 December 2026
19:00

South Africa	v	Ecuador
	Report

Mohammed VI Football Academy (Pitch 1), Salé

5 December 2026
17:00

Chinese Taipei	v	Ecuador
	Report

Mohammed VI Football Academy (Pitch 2), Salé
5 December 2026
17:00

Papua New Guinea	v	Ghana
	Report

Mohammed VI Football Academy (Pitch 1), Salé
5 December 2026
17:00

South Africa	v	Uzbekistan
	Report

Mohammed VI Football Academy (Pitch 3), Salé

== Final phase ==
Teams participating in the final phase will be ranked according to the FIFA Women's World Ranking. The three highest-ranked teams from different confederations will be seeded into pathways, and the three remaining teams will be drawn as their opponents to play a single match. Teams from the same confederation cannot play against each other. If a match is level at the end of regulation, two 15-minute periods of extra time will be played. If a match is still level at the end of extra time, the match will be decided by a penalty shoot-out. The winner of each match will qualify for the 2027 FIFA Women's World Cup.

Draw table
Seeded teams	Unseeded teams
1. Seeded team 2. Seeded team 3. Seeded team	4. Unseeded team 5. Unseeded team 6. Unseeded team

=== Summary ===
Team 1	Score	Team 2
Seed 1	Feb '27	Team 1
Seed 2	Feb '27	Team 2
Seed 3	Feb '27	Team 3

=== Matches ===
February 2027

Seed 1	v	Team 1

February 2027

Seed 2	v	Team 2

February 2027

Seed 3	v	Team 3

== Qualified teams for FIFA Women's World Cup ==
The following three teams will qualify for the 2027 FIFA Women's World Cup in Brazil.

Team	Qualified on	Previous appearances in FIFA Women's World Cup
TBD	February 2027	
TBD	February 2027	
TBD	February 2027	
