= AS Dakar Sacré-Cœur =

Senegalese football club

- Full name: Association Sportive Dakar Sacré-Cœur
- Founded: 1 January 2005; 21 years ago
- Ground: Stade municipal de Yoff; Dakar
- Capacity: 3,000
- Chairman: Malick Biram Diagne
- Manager: Ibrahima Ousmane Diop
- League: Senegal Premier League
- 2025–26: 12th
- Website: dakarsacrecoeur.com
Home colours	Away colours

Association Sportive Dakar Sacré-Cœur is a Senegalese football club located in Dakar, Senegal.

== History ==
AS Dakar Sacré-Cœur was founded in 2005, with the professional team beginning operation in October 2010. They are a partner of the French club Olympique Lyonnais. They have a men's team that plays in the Senegal Premier League, a women's team in the Senegalese first division, and a training center with more than 65 youth footballers. They are also associated with a football school with more than 1,800 children.

== Colours ==
The club's colours are blue and white.

== Squad ==
As of 2 January 2024

Note: Flags indicate national team as defined under FIFA eligibility rules; some limited exceptions apply. Players may hold more than one non-FIFA nationality.

No.	Pos.	Nation	Player
6	MF	SEN	Ibrahima Mané
15	DF	SEN	Cheikh Koné
20	FW	SEN	Abdourahmane Ba
41	FW	SEN	Samba Pape Ndour
—	GK	SEN	Lamine Ba
—	GK	SEN	Pape Dieng
—	GK	SEN	El Hadji Gueye
—	DF	SEN	Adama Wade
—	DF	SEN	Malick Kandji
—	DF	SEN	Abdoulaye Diouf
—	DF	SEN	Mbaye Ndiaye
