= Yen Shih-kai =

Taiwanese football manager

Yen Shih-kai (Chinese: 顏士凱; born 4 December 1969) is a Taiwanese football manager who last managed Chinese Taipei.

== Career ==
Yen has been regarded as one of the most important managers in Taiwanese women's football and managed the Chinese Taipei national football team.
