= Murphy Sheaff =

New Zealand soccer player (born 2003)

Personal information
- Full name: Murphy Lyn Hunt-Sheaff
- Date of birth: 12 September 2003 (age 23)
- Height: 1.75 m (5 ft 9 in)
- Position: Goalkeeper

Team information
- Current team: Oklahoma State Cowgirls
- Number: 1

College career
Years	Team	Apps	(Gls)
2022	Jacksonville Dolphins	13	(0)
2023–2024	Kansas State Wildcats	36	(0)
2025–	Oklahoma State Cowgirls	0	(0)

International career
2022	New Zealand U-20	3	(0)

Murphy Lyn Hunt-Sheaff (born September 12, 2003) is a New Zealand college soccer player who plays as a goalkeeper for the Oklahoma State Cowgirls. She previously played for the Jacksonville Dolphins and the Kansas State Wildcats. She was an alternate for New Zealand's squad at the 2024 Summer Olympics.

== College career ==
After graduating from Chancellor State College in the Sunshine Coast in Australia, Sheaff moved to the United States in 2022 to attend Jacksonville University. She played in 13 games for the Dolphins, starting 8 of them, and allowed just 6 goals against 55 saves, good for a nationally leading 90% save percentage. She transferred to Kansas State University in 2023, starting all 36 games and keeping 8 clean sheets over two seasons. Her junior year she led the Big 12 Conference in total saves. She transferred to Oklahoma State University in 2025.

== International career ==
Sheaff started all three games for the New Zealand under-20s at the 2022 FIFA U-20 Women's World Cup in India, a group stage exit with two draws.

Sheaff received her first senior call-up to New Zealand before two friendlies against the United States in January before the 2023 FIFA Women's World Cup. She next made the roster the following June before the 2024 Summer Olympics and was included in the tournament squad as an alternate.
