= Texas Health Mansfield Stadium =

Sports stadium in Mansfield, Texas

- Interactive map of Texas Health Mansfield Stadium
- Full name: Texas Health Mansfield Stadium
- Address: 3405 Stadium Drive
- Location: Mansfield, Texas, U.S.
- Coordinates: 32.550°N 97.080°W
- Capacity: 7,000

Construction
- Groundbreaking: December 18, 2024
- Opened: July 1, 2026; 3 months ago

Tenants
- North Texas SC (MLSNP) (2026–present)

Texas Health Mansfield Stadium is a multiuse soccer complex in Mansfield, Texas. It opened in July 2026. Naming rights are held by Texas Health Resources, an Arlington-based hospital and physician group chain.

== History ==
The stadium, located on Texas State Highway 360, was scheduled to be completed prior to the 2026 FIFA World Cup. North Texas SC of the MLS Next Pro league will begin playing home games at the stadium in 2026.

In March 2026, the stadium was named as a base camp for the 2026 FIFA World Cup, and was used by the national team of the Czech Republic.
