= 2028 EAFF E-1 Football Championship (women) =

2028年东亚女子足球锦标赛

Tournament details
- Host country: China
- Dates: January
- Teams: 4 (from 1 sub-confederation)

The 2028 EAFF E-1 Football Championship will be an association football tournament organized by the East Asian Football Federation. It will be the tenth edition of the women's tournament of the EAFF E-1 Football Championship, the women's football championship of East Asia.

== Teams ==
The following teams will participate in this edition.

| Final round | Preliminary round |
|---|---|
| China (hosts); Japan; North Korea | South Korea; Chinese Taipei; Guam (hosts); Macau; Northern Mariana Islands |

== Preliminary round ==
The preliminary round was held in Guam from 3 to 9 June 2026.

=== Group A ===
| Pos | Team | Pld | W | D | L | GF | GA | GD | Pts | Qualification |
|---|---|---|---|---|---|---|---|---|---|---|
| 1 | South Korea (Q) | 2 | 2 | 0 | 0 | 18 | 0 | +18 | 6 | Final |
| 2 | Guam | 2 | 1 | 0 | 1 | 3 | 5 | −2 | 3 | |
| 3 | Macau | 2 | 0 | 0 | 2 | 0 | 16 | −16 | 0 | |

Source: EAFF
(Q) Qualified for the phase indicated
3 June 2026
18:00

| South Korea | 5–0 | Guam |
|---|---|---|
| | Report |

5 June 2026
14:30

| Macau | 0–13 | South Korea |
|---|---|---|
| | Report |

7 June 2026
19:15

| Guam | 3–0 | Macau |
|---|---|---|
| | Report |

=== Group B ===
| Pos | Team | Pld | W | D | L | GF | GA | GD | Pts | Qualification |
|---|---|---|---|---|---|---|---|---|---|---|
| 1 | Chinese Taipei | 2 | 2 | 0 | 0 | 18 | 0 | +18 | 6 | Final |
| 2 | Northern Mariana Islands | 2 | 0 | 0 | 2 | 0 | 18 | −18 | 0 | |

Source: EAFF
5 June 2026
19:15

| Chinese Taipei | 5–0 | Northern Mariana Islands |
|---|---|---|
| | Report |

7 June 2026
14:30

| Northern Mariana Islands | 0–13 | Chinese Taipei |
|---|---|---|
| | Report |

=== Final ===
9 June 2026
18:00

| South Korea | 5–3 (a.e.t.) | Chinese Taipei |
|---|---|---|
| | Report |

== Final round ==
=== Table ===
| Pos | Team | Pld | W | D | L | GF | GA | GD | Pts | Result |
|---|---|---|---|---|---|---|---|---|---|---|
| 1 | South Korea | 0 | 0 | 0 | 0 | 0 | 0 | 0 | 0 | Champions |
| 2 | China (H) | 0 | 0 | 0 | 0 | 0 | 0 | 0 | 0 | Runners-up |
| 3 | Japan | 0 | 0 | 0 | 0 | 0 | 0 | 0 | 0 | Third place |
| 4 | North Korea | 0 | 0 | 0 | 0 | 0 | 0 | 0 | 0 | Fourth place |

Source: EAFF
(H) Hosts
