= 2027 FIFA Women's World Cup =

International football competition

Copa do Mundo Feminina da FIFA 2027

Tournament details
- Host country: Brazil
- Dates: 24 June – 25 July
- Teams: 32 (from 6 confederations)
- Venues: 8 (in 8 host cities)

The 2027 FIFA Women's World Cup is scheduled to be the 10th edition of the FIFA Women's World Cup, the quadrennial international women's football championship contested by the national teams of the member associations of FIFA. The tournament will include 32 teams for the second time after FIFA announced the expansion of the tournament in July 2019. Spain are the defending champions, having won their first title in 2023. This will be the second and last edition of the tournament to be contested by 32 teams, with FIFA expanding to 48 teams for the next edition in 2031.

On 17 May 2024, FIFA announced that Brazil won the hosting rights, making this the first FIFA Women's World Cup to be held in South America and Latin America. Brazil will become the sixth country—after Sweden, the United States, Germany, France, and Canada—to host both the men's and women's World Cup, having hosted the men's tournament in 1950 and 2014. It is also the first country to host eight different FIFA competitions. (Note: Brazil hosted the 2016 Olympic football tournaments, the 2000 FIFA Club World Championship, the 2013 FIFA Confederations Cup, the 2019 FIFA U-17 World Cup, the 2008 FIFA Futsal World Cup, and the first three editions of the FIFA-organised Beach Soccer World Cup in 2005, 2006, and 2007.)

== Host selection ==
On 23 March 2023, FIFA announced that bidding had begun for the 2027 FIFA Women's World Cup. Member associations interested in hosting the tournament had to submit a declaration of interest by 21 April, and provide the completed bidding registration by 8 December. Fourteen countries initially indicated interest in hosting the event. These were Brazil, Chile, Italy, Mexico, South Africa, and the United States, along with the two joint bids of Belgium–Germany–Netherlands and Denmark–Finland–Iceland–Norway–Sweden (the "Nordic bid"). Chile, Italy, South Africa and the Nordic countries would later drop out, while the U.S. Soccer Federation and the Mexican Football Federation merged their bids into a joint submission. The U.S. and Mexico withdrew their bid in April 2024—just weeks before the host selection—to focus on the 2031 Women's World Cup instead.

=== Voting ===
Voting for the host took place on 17 May 2024, during the 74th FIFA Congress in Bangkok, and it was open to 207 eligible member associations. The Brazilian bid won with 119 ballots, while the Belgium–Germany–Netherlands bid received 78 ballots. Costa Rica, Curaçao, Dominican Republic, Namibia, Nigeria, Sudan, and Togo abstained from the vote, Libya did not vote for either candidate, and Norway and the Philippines were unable to vote due to technical difficulties.

74th FIFA Congress vote
Nation	Vote	Map
Nation	Round 1	
Brazil	119	
Belgium, Germany and Netherlands	78	
None of the bids	3	
Abstentions	7	Allowed to vote / Banned from voting; Voted for Brazilian bid / Brazil; Voted for BNG bid / Belgium–Germany–Netherlands; Voted for neither / Not a FIFA member; Abstained from voting
Total votes	207	Allowed to vote / Banned from voting; Voted for Brazilian bid / Brazil; Voted for BNG bid / Belgium–Germany–Netherlands; Voted for neither / Not a FIFA member; Abstained from voting
Majority required	104	Allowed to vote / Banned from voting; Voted for Brazilian bid / Brazil; Voted for BNG bid / Belgium–Germany–Netherlands; Voted for neither / Not a FIFA member; Abstained from voting

== Format ==
The Women's World Cup, since the 2023 edition, opens with a group stage consisting of eight groups of four teams, with the top two teams from each group advancing to knockout rounds, starting with a round of 16 teams. The number of games played overall is 64.

== Venues ==
Locations of the host cities of the 2027 FIFA Women's World Cup

Eight stadiums will be used for the tournament, all of which hosted matches during the 2014 FIFA World Cup. After Brazil received the hosting rights, the city of Natal expressed an interest in becoming a host city.

On 22 August 2024, it was confirmed by the CBF that the Estádio Mangueirão in Belém would also be one of the host city candidates, the only city that did not host the 2014 World Cup to make the shortlist. Belém was originally part of the Brazilian bid back in March 2023. However, the city was left out of the final September project due to the fact that the Mangueirão was still in the final stages of its renovation.

On 3 September 2024, Belém and Natal were included in the FIFA's selection process. Inspection visits took place between September and November 2024. Further inspections for training sites and hotels began in February 2025.

On 7 May 2025, the venues selected to host matches during the tournament were announced.

Rio de Janeiro	Brasília	Belo Horizonte	Fortaleza
Estádio do Maracanã	Arena BRB Mané Garrincha (Estádio Nacional Mané Garrincha)	Estádio Mineirão	Arena Castelão
Capacity: 73,139	Capacity: 69,910	Capacity: 66,658	Capacity: 57,867
Porto Alegre	São Paulo	Salvador	Recife (Note: The Arena Pernambuco is located in São Lourenço da Mata, Pernambuco.)
Estádio Beira-Rio	Neo Química Arena (Arena Itaquera)	Arena Acelen Fonte Nova (Arena Fonte Nova)	Arena Pernambuco
Capacity: 50,848	Capacity: 48,905	Capacity: 47,915	Capacity: 45,440

=== Team base camps ===
Base camps will be used by the 32 national squads to stay and train before and during the Women's World Cup tournament.

Team	Hotel	Training site
TBD	VIDAM Hotel Aracaju, Aracaju, Sergipe	Batistão, Aracaju, Sergipe
TBD	Hotel Araucária Flat, Araraquara, São Paulo	Arena Fonte Luminosa, Araraquara, São Paulo
TBD	Hotel Araraquara by Mercure, Araraquara, São Paulo	Arena Fonte Luminosa, Araraquara, São Paulo
TBD	Bourbon Resort Atibaia, Atibaia, São Paulo	CT Santa Filomena (Sfera FC), Jarinu, São Paulo
TBD	Grand Mercure Belém do Pará, Belém, Pará	Estádio Leonidas Sodre de Castro - Curuzú (Paysandu SC), Belém, Pará
TBD	Tivoli Maiorana Belem, Belém, Pará	Baenão, Belém, Pará
TBD	Spa do Vinho Condomínio Vitivinícola, Bento Gonçalves, Rio Grande do Sul	Estádio Parque Esportivo Montanha dos Vinhedos, Bento Gonçalves, Rio Grande do Sul
TBD	Brasília Palace Hotel, Brasília	CECAF, Brasília
TBD	CICB Hospitality, Brasília	Estádio JK Paranoá, Paranoá, Federal District
TBD	Hotel Royal Tulip Brasília Alvorada, Brasília	CT do Brasiliense F.C. SAF, Brasília
TBD	Hotel Retrô F.C. Brasil, Camaragibe, Pernambuco	CT do Retrô, Camaragibe, Pernambuco
TBD	CT Serra Branca On-Site Accommodation, Campina Grande, Paraíba	CT Serra Branca, Campina Grande, Paraíba
TBD	Slaviero Hotel Campina Grande, Campina Grande, Paraíba	CT Serra Branca, Campina Grande, Paraíba
TBD	Royal Palm Plaza Resort, Campinas, São Paulo	Estádio Brinco de Ouro da Princesa (Guarani FC), Campinas, São Paulo
TBD	Royal Palm Tower Anhanguera, Campinas, São Paulo	Estádio Brinco de Ouro da Princesa (Guarani FC), Campinas, São Paulo
TBD	Hotel Intercity Caxias do Sul, Caxias do Sul, Rio Grande do Sul	Estádio Centenário, Caxias do Sul, Rio Grande do Sul
TBD	Blue Tree Towers Caxias do Sul, Caxias do Sul, Rio Grande do Sul	CT Esporte Clube Juventude, Caxias do Sul, Rio Grande do Sul
TBD	CFA Cotia On-Site Accommodation, Cotia, São Paulo	CFA Cotia, Cotia, São Paulo
TBD	Hotel Deville Prime Cuiabá, Cuiabá, Mato Grosso	CT Manoel Dresch (Cuiabá EC), Cuiabá, Mato Grosso
TBD	Radisson Hotel Curitiba, Curitiba, Paraná	CT do Coritiba, Curitiba, Paraná
TBD	Hotel Qoya Curitiba By Hilton, Curitiba, Paraná	Estádio Couto Pereira, Curitiba, Paraná
TBD	Holiday Inn Goiânia, Goiânia, Goiás	CT do Vila Nova FC, Goiânia, Goiás
TBD	Transamérica Collection Orion, Goiânia, Goiás	Estádio Olímpico Pedro Ludovico, Goiânia, Goiás
TBD	SJ Premium Hotels by Atlantica, Goiânia, Goiás	Estádio Annibal Batista de Toledo, Aparecida de Goiânia, Goiás
TBD	CT Dartanhã On-site Accommodation, Guararema, São Paulo	CT Dartanhã, Guararema, São Paulo
TBD	Guararema Parque Hotel, Guararema, São Paulo	CT Dartanhã, Guararema, São Paulo
TBD	Novotel Itajaí, Itajaí, Santa Catarina	Estádio Hercílio Luz, Itajaí, Santa Catarina
TBD	Sandri Palace Hotel, Itajaí, Santa Catarina	Arena Barra FC, Itajaí, Santa Catarina
TBD	Novotel Itu Golf & Resort, Itu, São Paulo	Estádio Novelli Júnior, Itu, São Paulo
TBD	Oto Hotel Resort Convention e Spa, Itu, São Paulo	Oto Hotel Resort Convention e Spa Ltda, Itu, São Paulo
TBD	San Raphael Country Hotel, Itu, São Paulo	Estádio Municipal Walter Ribeiro, Sorocaba, São Paulo
TBD	Transamerica Lagoa Santa, Lagoa Santa, Minas Gerais	Cidade do Galo, Vespasiano, Minas Gerais
TBD	Bourbon Londrina Hotel, Londrina, Paraná	Estádio Vitorino Gonçalves Dias, Londrina, Paraná
TBD	JK Premium Hotel e Eventos, Londrina, Paraná	Estádio Vitorino Gonçalves Dias, Londrina, Paraná
TBD	Best Western Premier Maceio, Maceió, Alagoas	Estádio Rei Pelé, Maceió, Alagoas
TBD	Novotel Manaus, Manaus, Amazonas	Instituto Bosco Brasil Bindá, Manaus, Amazonas
TBD	Hotel Deville Business Maringá, Maringá, Paraná	CT do Maringá Futebol Clube, Maringá, Paraná
TBD	Tivoli Ecoresort Praia do Forte Bahia, Mata de São João, Bahia	CT Praia do Forte, Mata de São João, Bahia
TBD	SERHS Natal Grand Hotel & Resort, Natal, Rio Grande do Norte	Arena América, Parnamirim, Rio Grande do Norte
TBD	Porto Feliz Executive Hotel, Porto Feliz, São Paulo	Centro Esportivo Luneng Brasil (Desportivo Brasil), Porto Feliz, São Paulo
TBD	Eco Bahia Hotel Porto Seguro, Porto Seguro, Bahia	Estádio Municipal Agnaldo Bento dos Santos, Porto Seguro, Bahia
TBD	Beach Class Convention by MAI, Recife, Pernambuco	CT do Leão - Presidente José de Andrade Médicis (Sport Club do Recife), Recife, Pernambuco
TBD	Beach Class Convention by MAI, Recife, Pernambuco	CT Wilson Campos (Clube Náutico Capibaribe), Recife, Pernambuco
TBD	Hotel Mont Blanc Premium, Ribeirão Preto, São Paulo	Estádio Santa Cruz, Ribeirão Preto, São Paulo
TBD	Hotel JP Ribeirão Preto Resort & Convenções, Ribeirão Preto, São Paulo	Estádio Santa Cruz, Ribeirão Preto, São Paulo
TBD	Windsor Leme, Rio de Janeiro	EsEFEx, Rio de Janeiro
TBD	Novotel Santos Gonzaga, Santos, São Paulo	CT Rei Pelé, Santos, São Paulo
TBD	Sheraton Santos Hotel, Santos, São Paulo	CT Rei Pelé, Santos, São Paulo
TBD	Hyatt Place São José do Rio Preto, São José do Rio Preto, São Paulo	CT 1 Mirassol FC, Mirassol, São Paulo
TBD	Hotel Golden Tulip São José dos Campos, São José dos Campos, São Paulo	Estádio Martins Pereira, São José dos Campos, São Paulo
TBD	Novotel São José dos Campos, São José dos Campos, São Paulo	Estádio Martins Pereira, São José dos Campos, São Paulo
TBD	Novotel SP Center Norte, São Paulo	Centro de Treinamento da Portuguesa, São Paulo
TBD	Hotel Tulip Inn Sete Lagoas, Sete Lagoas, Minas Gerais	Arena do Jacaré, Sete Lagoas, Minas Gerais
TBD	CT Clube Atlético Sorocaba On-Site Accommodation, Sorocaba, São Paulo	Clube Atlético Sorocaba, Sorocaba, São Paulo
TBD	Granja Comary On-Site Accommodation, Teresópolis, Rio de Janeiro	Granja Comary, Teresópolis, Rio de Janeiro
TBD	Vila Ventura Eco Resort, Viamão, Rio Grande do Sul	Clube Futebol com Vida SAF, Viamão, Rio Grande do Sul
TBD	Golden Tulip Porto Vitória, Vitória, Espírito Santo	AERT, Serra, Espírito Santo
TBD	Comfort Suites Vitória, Vitória, Espírito Santo	Sindipol/ES, Serra, Espírito Santo
TBD	Hotel Senac Ilha do Boi, Vitória, Espírito Santo	Estádio Kleber Andrade, Cariacica, Espírito Santo

== Teams ==
=== Qualification ===
Team qualified Team still able to qualify Team eliminated Team withdrew or suspended Did not enter No women's team or not a FIFA member

Three of FIFA's confederations (AFC, CAF and CONCACAF) organise their qualifications through continental championships, while the other three (CONMEBOL, OFC and UEFA) organise their own qualifying competitions. The Brazil national team qualified automatically as a host. Russia had been suspended from all FIFA and UEFA competitions since 28 February 2022 due to the Russian invasion of Ukraine, and were excluded from the European qualification process. In July 2026, UEFA threatened to boycott all FIFA competitions if the FIFA Forward Enterprise proposal went ahead, which would have then placed UEFA's qualification spots in doubt.

The allocation of slots below was approved by the FIFA Council on 10 December 2024. The slot for the host nation will be taken directly from the quotas allocated to their confederation.

- AFC (Asia): 6 slots
- CAF (Africa): 4 slots
- CONCACAF (North America, Central America and the Caribbean): 4 slots
- CONMEBOL (South America): 3 slots (including hosts Brazil)
- OFC (Oceania): 1 slot
- UEFA (Europe): 11 slots
- Inter-confederation play-off tournament: 3 slots

A ten-team play-off tournament will decide the final three spots at the Women's World Cup. The play-off slot allocation is as follows:

- AFC (Asia): 2 slots
- CAF (Africa): 2 slots
- CONCACAF (North America, Central America and the Caribbean): 2 slots
- CONMEBOL (South America): 2 slots
- OFC (Oceania): 1 slot
- UEFA (Europe): 1 slot

Algeria and Malawi will make their debuts in any FIFA women's tournament, while Malawi became the lowest ranked team to ever qualify for a World Cup in either gender. North Korea returns after last appearing in 2011. Cameroon returns after not making the 2023 edition and became the first country to ever qualify for the Women's World Cup after initially failing to, as a late expansion to the 2026 Women's Africa Cup of Nations gave them a reprieve. Vietnam and Zambia failed to qualify after debuting in 2023, and Nigeria failed to qualify for the first time in Women's World Cup history.

=== Qualified teams ===
AFC (6)

- Australia
- China (Note: Recognised as China PR by FIFA)
- Japan
- North Korea (Note: Recognised as DPR Korea by FIFA)
- Philippines
- South Korea (Note: Recognised as Korea Republic by FIFA)

CAF (4)

- Algeria (debut)
- Cameroon
- Malawi (debut)
- Morocco

CONMEBOL (3)

- Argentina
- Brazil (host)
- Colombia

OFC (1)

- New Zealand

UEFA (11)

- Denmark
- France
- Germany
- Spain

=== Draw ===
The final draw will take place on 11 December 2026 at the Museum of Modern Art in Rio de Janeiro at 13:30 BRT (UTC−3), prior to the completion of qualification. The three winners of the inter-confederation play-off will not be known at the time of the draw.

For the draw, the 32 teams will be allocated into four pots based on the FIFA Women's World Ranking of 7 December 2026. Pot one will contain hosts Brazil, automatically assigned to position A1, along with the best seven teams. Pot two will contain the next best eight teams, with the next best eight teams being allocated into the following pot (pot three). Pot four will contain the lowest ranked teams, along with the placeholders for the three inter-confederation play-off winners.

Teams from the same confederation cannot be drawn into the same group - except for the UEFA teams, as there will be at least 11 participating teams from that confederation. Each group is therefore required to contain at least one UEFA team and no more than two UEFA teams will be able to be drawn into any one group. The confederation constraints shall also apply to the placeholders for the inter-confederation play-off winners. Additionally, as had been similarly implemented in the previous year's edition of the men's tournament, the top four ranked teams at the time of the draw will be allocated to the groups in such a way that they are drawn into separate pathways for the knockout stage, thereby ensuring that the top two ranked teams cannot meet each other until the final, and the third and fourth ranked teams cannot meet either of the top two ranked teams until the semi-finals, although this will only apply on the condition that these teams advance to the knockout stage as winners of their respective groups.

== Group stage ==
All times are BRT (UTC−3). Kick-off times are subject to change.

=== Group A ===
Pos	Team	Pld	W	D	L	GF	GA	GD	Pts	Qualification
1	Brazil (H)	0	0	0	0	0	0	0	0	Advance to knockout stage
2	A2	0	0	0	0	0	0	0	0	Advance to knockout stage
3	A3	0	0	0	0	0	0	0	0	
4	A4	0	0	0	0	0	0	0	0	

First match(es) will be played: 24 June 2027. Source: FIFA
Rules for classification: Group stage tiebreakers
(H) Hosts
24 June 2027

Brazil	v

Estádio do Maracanã, Rio de Janeiro
25 June 2027

v

Arena Accelen Fonte Nova, Salvador

29 June 2027

v

Arena Pernambuco, Recife
29 June 2027

Brazil	v

Neo Química Arena, São Paulo

4 July 2027

v

Arena Accelen Fonte Nova, Salvador
4 July 2027

Brazil	v

Arena BRB Mané Garrincha, Brasília

=== Group B ===
Pos	Team	Pld	W	D	L	GF	GA	GD	Pts	Qualification
1	B1	0	0	0	0	0	0	0	0	Advance to knockout stage
2	B2	0	0	0	0	0	0	0	0	Advance to knockout stage
3	B3	0	0	0	0	0	0	0	0	
4	B4	0	0	0	0	0	0	0	0	

First match(es) will be played: 25 June 2027. Source: FIFA
Rules for classification: Group stage tiebreakers
25 June 2027

v

Arena BRB Mané Garrincha, Brasília
25 June 2027

v

Neo Química Arena, São Paulo

30 June 2027

v

Estádio Mineirão, Belo Horizonte
30 June 2027

v

Estádio Beira-Rio, Porto Alegre

5 July 2027

v

Arena Pernambuco, Recife
5 July 2027

v

Estádio do Maracanã, Rio de Janeiro

=== Group C ===
Pos	Team	Pld	W	D	L	GF	GA	GD	Pts	Qualification
1	C1	0	0	0	0	0	0	0	0	Advance to knockout stage
2	C2	0	0	0	0	0	0	0	0	Advance to knockout stage
3	C3	0	0	0	0	0	0	0	0	
4	C4	0	0	0	0	0	0	0	0	

First match(es) will be played: 26 June 2027. Source: FIFA
Rules for classification: Group stage tiebreakers
26 June 2027

v

Estádio Mineirão, Belo Horizonte
26 June 2027

v

Estádio Beira-Rio, Porto Alegre

30 June 2027

v

Estádio do Maracanã, Rio de Janeiro
1 July 2027

v

Arena BRB Mané Garrincha, Brasília

5 July 2027

v

Estádio Mineirão, Belo Horizonte
5 July 2027

v

Estádio Beira-Rio, Porto Alegre

=== Group D ===
Pos	Team	Pld	W	D	L	GF	GA	GD	Pts	Qualification
1	D1	0	0	0	0	0	0	0	0	Advance to knockout stage
2	D2	0	0	0	0	0	0	0	0	Advance to knockout stage
3	D3	0	0	0	0	0	0	0	0	
4	D4	0	0	0	0	0	0	0	0	

First match(es) will be played: 26 June 2027. Source: FIFA
Rules for classification: Group stage tiebreakers
26 June 2027

v

Arena Castelão, Fortaleza
26 June 2027

v

Estádio do Maracanã, Rio de Janeiro

1 July 2027

v

Arena Pernambuco, Recife
1 July 2027

v

Neo Química Arena, São Paulo

6 July 2027

v

Arena Castelão, Fortaleza
6 July 2027

v

Arena BRB Mané Garrincha, Brasília

=== Group E ===
Pos	Team	Pld	W	D	L	GF	GA	GD	Pts	Qualification
1	E1	0	0	0	0	0	0	0	0	Advance to knockout stage
2	E2	0	0	0	0	0	0	0	0	Advance to knockout stage
3	E3	0	0	0	0	0	0	0	0	
4	E4	0	0	0	0	0	0	0	0	

First match(es) will be played: 27 June 2027. Source: FIFA
Rules for classification: Group stage tiebreakers
27 June 2027

v

Arena Pernambuco, Recife
27 June 2027

v

Arena BRB Mané Garrincha, Brasília

2 July 2027

v

Arena Castelão, Fortaleza
2 July 2027

v

Arena Pernambuco, Recife

7 July 2027

v

Arena Pernambuco, Recife
7 July 2027

v

Estádio Mineirão, Belo Horizonte

=== Group F ===
Pos	Team	Pld	W	D	L	GF	GA	GD	Pts	Qualification
1	F1	0	0	0	0	0	0	0	0	Advance to knockout stage
2	F2	0	0	0	0	0	0	0	0	Advance to knockout stage
3	F3	0	0	0	0	0	0	0	0	
4	F4	0	0	0	0	0	0	0	0	

First match(es) will be played: 27 June 2027. Source: FIFA
Rules for classification: Group stage tiebreakers
27 June 2027

v

Arena Accelen Fonte Nova, Salvador
27 June 2027

v

Neo Química Arena, São Paulo

2 July 2027

v

Estádio Mineirão, Belo Horizonte
3 July 2027

v

Estádio Beira-Rio, Porto Alegre

7 July 2027

v

Arena Accelen Fonte Nova, Salvador
7 July 2027

v

Estádio do Maracanã, Rio de Janeiro

=== Group G ===
Pos	Team	Pld	W	D	L	GF	GA	GD	Pts	Qualification
1	G1	0	0	0	0	0	0	0	0	Advance to knockout stage
2	G2	0	0	0	0	0	0	0	0	Advance to knockout stage
3	G3	0	0	0	0	0	0	0	0	
4	G4	0	0	0	0	0	0	0	0	

First match(es) will be played: 28 June 2027. Source: FIFA
Rules for classification: Group stage tiebreakers
28 June 2027

v

Arena Castelão, Fortaleza
28 June 2027

v

Estádio Mineirão, Belo Horizonte

3 July 2027

v

Arena Pernambuco, Recife
3 July 2027

v

Estádio do Maracanã, Rio de Janeiro

8 July 2027

v

Arena Castelão, Fortaleza
8 July 2027

v

Neo Química Arena, São Paulo

=== Group H ===
Pos	Team	Pld	W	D	L	GF	GA	GD	Pts	Qualification
1	H1	0	0	0	0	0	0	0	0	Advance to knockout stage
2	H2	0	0	0	0	0	0	0	0	Advance to knockout stage
3	H3	0	0	0	0	0	0	0	0	
4	H4	0	0	0	0	0	0	0	0	

First match(es) will be played: 28 June 2027. Source: FIFA
Rules for classification: Group stage tiebreakers
28 June 2027

v

Estádio Beira-Rio, Porto Alegre
29 June 2027

v

Arena Accelen Fonte Nova, Salvador

4 July 2027

v

Arena Castelão, Fortaleza
4 July 2027

v

Neo Química Arena, São Paulo

8 July 2027

v

Arena BRB Mané Garrincha, Brasília
8 July 2027

v

Estádio Beira-Rio, Porto Alegre

== Knockout stage ==
=== Bracket ===
Round of 16
10 July – Fortaleza
Winner Group A
Runner-up Group B
10 July – Recife
Winner Group C
Runner-up Group D
12 July – Porto Alegre
Winner Group E
Runner-up Group F
12 July – Salvador
Winner Group G
Runner-up Group H
11 July – Belo Horizonte
Winner Group B
Runner-up Group A
11 July – São Paulo
Winner Group D
Runner-up Group C
13 July – Fortaleza
Winner Group F
Runner-up Group E
13 July – Brasília
Winner Group H
Runner-up Group G

Quarter-finals
16 July – Belo Horizonte
Winner Match 49
Winner Match 50
16 July – Rio de Janeiro
Winner Match 53
Winner Match 54
17 July – Fortaleza
Winner Match 51
Winner Match 52
17 July – São Paulo
Winner Match 55
Winner Match 56

Semi-finals
20 July – São Paulo
Winner Match 57
Winner Match 58
21 July – Rio de Janeiro
Winner Match 59
Winner Match 60

Final
25 July – Rio de Janeiro
Winner Match 61
Winner Match 62
Match for third place
24 July – São Paulo
Loser Match 61
Loser Match 62

=== Round of 16 ===
10 July 2027

Winner Group A	v	Runner-up Group B

Arena Castelão, Fortaleza

10 July 2027

Winner Group C	v	Runner-up Group D

Arena Pernambuco, Recife

11 July 2027

Winner Group B	v	Runner-up Group A

Estádio Mineirão, Belo Horizonte

11 July 2027

Winner Group D	v	Runner-up Group C

Neo Química Arena, São Paulo

12 July 2027

Winner Group E	v	Runner-up Group F

Estádio Beira-Rio, Porto Alegre

12 July 2027

Winner Group G	v	Runner-up Group H

Arena Accelen Fonte Nova, Salvador

13 July 2027

Winner Group F	v	Runner-up Group E

Arena Castelão, Fortaleza

13 July 2027

Winner Group H	v	Runner-up Group G

Arena BRB Mané Garrincha, Brasília

=== Quarter-finals ===
16 July 2027

Winner Match 49	v	Winner Match 50

Estádio Mineirão, Belo Horizonte

16 July 2027

Winner Match 53	v	Winner Match 54

Estádio do Maracanã, Rio de Janeiro

17 July 2027

Winner Match 51	v	Winner Match 52

Arena Castelão, Fortaleza

17 July 2027

Winner Match 55	v	Winner Match 56

Neo Química Arena, São Paulo

=== Semi-finals ===
20 July 2027

Winner Match 57	v	Winner Match 58

Neo Química Arena, São Paulo

21 July 2027

Winner Match 59	v	Winner Match 60

Estádio do Maracanã, Rio de Janeiro

=== Match for third place ===
24 July 2027

Loser Match 61	v	Loser Match 62

Neo Química Arena, São Paulo

=== Final ===
25 July 2027
16:00

Winner Match 61	v	Winner Match 62

Estádio do Maracanã, Rio de Janeiro

== Marketing ==
=== Branding ===
The official emblem was unveiled on 25 January 2026 during an event at Copacabana in Rio de Janeiro. The emblem's design was inspired by the Brazilian flag as well as football pitches, crafted from the union of "W" (representing the words "women" and "world") and "M" (from the equivalent Portuguese words "mulheres" and "mundo"). The slogan "Go Epic" ("Vai Ser Épico" in Portuguese) was also unveiled the same day.

=== Broadcasting ===
- Albania – Saran Media Group
- Armenia – Saran Media Group
- Australia – Paramount+ and Network 10
- Azerbaijan – Saran Media Group
- Belgium – RTBF, VRT
- Bosnia and Herzegovina – Saran Media Group
- Brazil – Grupo Globo and CazéTV
- Bulgaria – Saran Media Group
- Canada – Netflix
- China – CCTV
- Croatia – Saran Media Group
- Czech Republic – CRo, CT
- Denmark – DR, TV 2
- Estonia – Saran Media Group
- European Union – EBU
- Finland – Yle
- France – M6
- Georgia – Saran Media Group
- Germany – Magenta Sport
- Greenland – EBU
- Hungary – MTVA
- Iceland – RÚV
- India – Zee
- Indonesia - TVRI
- Ireland – Saran Media Group
- Kazakhstan – Saran Media Group
- Kosovo – Saran Media Group
- Kyrgyzstan – Saran Media Group
- Latvia – Saran Media Group
- Liechtenstein – EBU
- Lithuania – Saran Media Group
- Luxembourg – EBU
- Malta – PBS
- Mexico – Tudn Mexico
- Moldova – Saran Media Group
- Montenegro – Saran Media Group
- Netherlands – NOS
- North Macedonia – Saran Media Group
- Norway – NRK, TV 2 Direkte
- Poland – TVP
- Romania – Saran Media Group
- Serbia – Saran Media Group
- Slovakia – RTVS
- Slovenia – Saran Media Group
- Singapore – Mediacorp
- South Africa – SABC
- South Korea – JTBC and Naver
- Sub-Saharan Africa – New World TV
- Spain – RTVE
- Sweden – SR, SVT, TV4
- Switzerland – SRG SSR
- Tajikistan – Saran Media Group
- Thailand – MONOMAX Sports
- Türkiye – Saran Media Group and S Sport
- Turkmenistan – Saran Media Group
- Ukraine – Suspilne
- United Kingdom – BBC, ITV
- United States – Netflix
- Uzbekistan – Saran Media Group

=== Sponsorships ===
FIFA partners	FIFA Women's World Cup sponsors	FIFA Women's World Cup supporters
Adidas; Aramco; Coca-Cola; Hyundai–Kia; Lenovo; Qatar Airways; Visa	AB InBev (Budweiser+Others); Frito-Lay (Lay's); Mengniu Dairy; Unilever (Rexona)	Airbnb; DoorDash; Globant; Salesforce; Valvoline; Verizon

== Ticketing ==
It is expected that all matches of the 2027 FIFA Women's World Cup are going to have half price tickets for students, elderly people and low-income youth registered in the CadÚnico (a Brazilian government system used to identify low-income families and ensure access to social benefits).

== Controversies ==
=== UEFA boycott ===
On 30 July 2026, following FIFA's announcement of FIFA Forward Enterprise (a proposal to sell stakes in FIFA's tournament operations, including for the Women's World Cup, to private investors), all 55 UEFA member associations agreed on an indefinite boycott of FIFA competitions until the proposal was shelved and assurances were made that such a proposal would not be tabulated again. FIFA Forward Enterprise was scrapped on 31 July. Following written assurances that a similar proposal wouldn't be brought up, on 27 August UEFA provisionally suspended their boycott, including for the 2027 FIFA Women's World Cup.

== See also ==
- 2026 FIFA World Cup
