= 2023 FIFA Women's World Cup Group F =

Football tournament teams

Group F of the 2023 FIFA Women's World Cup was one of eight groups that formed the opening round of the tournament with the matches played from 23 July to 2 August 2023. The group consisted of France, Jamaica, Brazil and Panama. The top two teams, France and Jamaica, advanced to the round of 16.

Ahead of the tournament, the Brazilian government announced that they would move working hours of the civil service on the days of Brazil's matches in the World Cup, with the working day starting two hours after the scheduled conclusion of games; due to the time difference, Brazil's group matches were all kicked-off at commuter times. This ended in vain, as Brazil was eliminated in the group stage for the first time since finishing bottom in 1995. On the other hand, Jamaica became the first Caribbean team to advance from a senior World Cup group stage.

== Teams ==
Draw position	Team	Pot	Confederation	Method of qualification	Date of qualification	Finals appearance	Last appearance	Previous best performance	FIFA Rankings	
Draw position	Team	Pot	Confederation	Method of qualification	Date of qualification	Finals appearance	Last appearance	Previous best performance	October 2022 (Note: The rankings of October 2022 were used for seeding for the final draw.)	June 2023
F1	France	1	UEFA	UEFA Group I winners	12 April 2022	5th	2019	Fourth place (2011)	5	5
F2	Jamaica	3	CONCACAF	2022 CONCACAF W Championship third place	11 July 2022	2nd	2019	Group stage (2019)	43	43
F3	Brazil	2	CONMEBOL	2022 Copa América Femenina champions	26 July 2022	9th	2019	Runners-up (2007)	9	8
F4	Panama	4 (Note: As the identity of the inter-confederation play-off Group C winners was not known at the time of the final draw, positions in the FIFA Rankings were not taken into account, and the placeholder in the draw was automatically seeded into pot 4.)	CONCACAF	Inter-confederation play-off Group C winners	23 February 2023	1st	—	Debut	57	52

== Standings ==
Pos	Team	Pld	W	D	L	GF	GA	GD	Pts	Qualification
1	France	3	2	1	0	8	4	+4	7	Advance to knockout stage
2	Jamaica	3	1	2	0	1	0	+1	5	Advance to knockout stage
3	Brazil	3	1	1	1	5	2	+3	4	
4	Panama	3	0	0	3	3	11	−8	0	

Source: FIFA
Rules for classification: Group stage tiebreakers

In the round of 16:

- The winners of Group F, France, advanced to play the runners-up of Group H, Morocco.
- The runners-up of Group F, Jamaica, advanced to play the winners of Group H, Colombia.

== Matches ==
All times listed are local.

=== France vs Jamaica ===
23 July 2023
20:00 UTC+10

France	0–0	Jamaica
	Report

Sydney Football Stadium, Sydney
Attendance: 39,045
Referee: María Carvajal (Chile)

France	Jamaica

GK	16	Pauline Peyraud-Magnin
RB	2	Maëlle Lakrar
CB	3	Wendie Renard (c)
CB	20	Estelle Cascarino
LB	7	Sakina Karchaoui
RM	12	Clara Matéo	(yellow card) 14'	(substituted off) 66'
CM	8	Grace Geyoro
CM	6	Sandie Toletti
LM	10	Amel Majri		(substituted off) 66'
CF	11	Kadidiatou Diani
CF	9	Eugénie Le Sommer
Substitutions:
FW	23	Vicki Bècho		(substituted in) 66'
MF	15	Kenza Dali		(substituted in) 66'
Manager:
Hervé Renard

GK	13	Rebecca Spencer
RB	19	Tiernny Wiltshire
CB	17	Allyson Swaby
CB	4	Chantelle Swaby
LB	14	Deneisha Blackwood
RM	21	Cheyna Matthews		(substituted off) 70'
CM	8	Drew Spence
CM	3	Vyan Sampson
LM	10	Jody Brown
CF	20	Atlanta Primus	(yellow card) 24'	(substituted off) 70'
CF	11	Khadija Shaw (c)	(yellow card) 37' (yellow-red card) 90+2'
Substitutions:
MF	6	Havana Solaun		(substituted in) 70'
MF	2	Solai Washington		(substituted in) 70'
Manager:
Lorne Donaldson

Player of the Match:
Deneisha Blackwood (Jamaica)

Assistant referees:
Leslie Vásquez (Chile)
Loreto Toloza (Chile)
Fourth official:
Laura Fortunato (Argentina)
Video assistant referee:
Nicolás Gallo (Colombia)
Assistant video assistant referee:
Juan Soto (Venezuela)
Offside video assistant referee:
Mariana de Almeida (Argentina)

=== Brazil vs Panama ===
24 July 2023
20:30 UTC+9:30

Brazil	4–0	Panama
Ary Borges 19', 39', 70'; Bia Zaneratto 48'	Report

Hindmarsh Stadium, Adelaide
Attendance: 13,142
Referee: Cheryl Foster (Wales)

Brazil	Panama

GK	12	Letícia Izidoro
RB	2	Antônia	(substituted off) 59'
CB	14	Lauren
CB	4	Rafaelle Souza (c)
LB	6	Tamires
RM	17	Ary Borges	(substituted off) 75'
CM	5	Luana	(substituted off) 75'
CM	21	Kerolin
LM	11	Adriana
CF	9	Debinha	(substituted off) 59'
CF	16	Bia Zaneratto	(substituted off) 59'
Substitutions:
FW	23	Gabi Nunes	(substituted in) 59'
DF	13	Bruninha	(substituted in) 59'
FW	18	Geyse	(substituted in) 59'
FW	10	Marta	(substituted in) 75'
MF	15	Duda Sampaio	(substituted in) 75'
Manager:
(Sweden) Pia Sundhage

GK	12	Yenith Bailey
CB	23	Carina Baltrip-Reyes
CB	5	Yomira Pinzón
CB	15	Rosario Vargas	(substituted off) 83'
RWB	4	Katherine Castillo
LWB	2	Hilary Jaén	(substituted off) 46'
RM	11	Natalia Mills (c)	(substituted off) 53'
CM	8	Schiandra González
CM	20	Aldrith Quintero	(substituted off) 65'
LM	10	Marta Cox	(substituted off) 79'
CF	9	Karla Riley	(substituted off) 53'
Substitutions:
DF	3	Wendy Natis	(substituted in) 46'
MF	7	Emily Cedeño	(substituted in) 53'
FW	13	Riley Tanner	(substituted in) 53'
MF	6	Deysiré Salazar	(substituted in) 65'
FW	19	Lineth Cedeño	(substituted in) 79'
MF	14	Carmen Montenegro	(substituted in) 83'
Manager:
(Mexico) Ignacio Quintana

Player of the Match:
Ary Borges (Brazil)

Assistant referees:
Michelle O'Neill (Republic of Ireland)
Franca Overtoom (Netherlands)
Fourth official:
Iuliana Demetrescu (Romania)
Video assistant referee:
Massimiliano Irrati (Italy)
Assistant video assistant referee:
Alejandro Hernández Hernández (Spain)
Offside video assistant referee:
Guadalupe Porras Ayuso (Spain)

=== France vs Brazil ===
29 July 2023
20:00 UTC+10

France	2–1	Brazil
Le Sommer 17'; Renard 83'	Report	Debinha 58'

Lang Park, Brisbane
Attendance: 49,378
Referee: Kate Jacewicz (Australia)

France	Brazil

GK	16	Pauline Peyraud-Magnin
RB	22	Ève Périsset
CB	2	Maëlle Lakrar
CB	3	Wendie Renard (c)
LB	7	Sakina Karchaoui	(yellow card) 69'
DM	6	Sandie Toletti	(yellow card) 29'
CM	8	Grace Geyoro
CM	15	Kenza Dali	(yellow card) 11'	(substituted off) 87'
RF	11	Kadidiatou Diani
CF	9	Eugénie Le Sommer		(substituted off) 65'
LF	13	Selma Bacha
Substitutions:
FW	23	Vicki Bècho		(substituted in) 65'
MF	17	Léa Le Garrec		(substituted in) 87'
Manager:
Hervé Renard			(yellow card) 90+8'

GK	12	Letícia Izidoro
RB	2	Antônia		(substituted off) 86'
CB	14	Lauren
CB	4	Rafaelle Souza (c)
LB	6	Tamires
RM	17	Ary Borges		(substituted off) 86'
CM	21	Kerolin
CM	5	Luana	(yellow card) 44'
LM	11	Adriana		(substituted off) 80'
CF	9	Debinha		(substituted off) 86'
CF	18	Geyse		(substituted off) 61'
Substitutions:
FW	7	Andressa Alves		(substituted in) 61'
FW	16	Bia Zaneratto		(substituted in) 80'
FW	10	Marta		(substituted in) 86'
DF	19	Mônica		(substituted in) 86'
MF	8	Ana Vitória		(substituted in) 86'
Manager:
(Sweden) Pia Sundhage

Player of the Match:
Eugénie Le Sommer (France)

Assistant referees:
Kim Kyoung-min (South Korea)
Joanna Charaktis (Australia)
Fourth official:
Lina Lehtovaara (Finland)
Video assistant referee:
Massimiliano Irrati (Italy)
Assistant video assistant referee:
Armando Villarreal (United States)
Offside video assistant referee:
Enedina Caudillo (Mexico)

=== Panama vs Jamaica ===
29 July 2023
20:30 UTC+8

Panama	0–1	Jamaica
	Report	A. Swaby 56'

Perth Rectangular Stadium, Perth
Attendance: 15,987
Referee: Kateryna Monzul (Ukraine)

Panama	Jamaica

GK	12	Yenith Bailey
CB	3	Wendy Natis
CB	5	Yomira Pinzón
CB	23	Carina Baltrip-Reyes		(substituted off) 87'
RWB	7	Emily Cedeño	(yellow card) 13'
LWB	4	Katherine Castillo
RM	19	Lineth Cedeño		(substituted off) 65'
CM	6	Deysiré Salazar	(yellow card) 18'	(substituted off) 46'
CM	8	Schiandra González		(substituted off) 78'
LM	13	Riley Tanner
CF	10	Marta Cox (c)
Substitutions:
MF	20	Aldrith Quintero		(substituted in) 46'
FW	9	Karla Riley		(substituted in) 65'
MF	14	Carmen Montenegro		(substituted in) 78'
DF	2	Hilary Jaén		(substituted in) 87'
Manager:
(Mexico) Ignacio Quintana

GK	13	Rebecca Spencer
RB	15	Tiffany Cameron		(substituted off) 87'
CB	17	Allyson Swaby (c)
CB	4	Chantelle Swaby
LB	14	Deneisha Blackwood	(yellow card) 31'
DM	3	Vyan Sampson
CM	20	Atlanta Primus		(substituted off) 87'
CM	8	Drew Spence
RF	18	Trudi Carter		(substituted off) 65'
CF	22	Kayla McKenna		(substituted off) 80'
LF	10	Jody Brown		(substituted off) 80'
Substitutions:
FW	21	Cheyna Matthews		(substituted in) 65'
MF	2	Solai Washington		(substituted in) 80'
FW	9	Kameron Simmonds		(substituted in) 80'
FW	19	Tiernny Wiltshire		(substituted in) 87'
MF	7	Peyton McNamara		(substituted in) 87'
Manager:
Lorne Donaldson

Player of the Match:
Allyson Swaby (Jamaica)

Assistant referees:
Maryna Striletska (Ukraine)
Paulina Baranowska (Poland)
Fourth official:
Akhona Makalima (South Africa)
Video assistant referee:
Juan Martínez Munuera (Spain)
Assistant video assistant referee:
Adil Zourak (Morocco)
Offside video assistant referee:
Sian Massey-Ellis (England)

=== Panama vs France ===
2 August 2023
20:00 UTC+10

Panama	3–6	France
Cox 2'; Pinzón 64' (pen.); L. Cedeño 87'	Report	Lakrar 21'; Diani 28', 37' (pen.), 52' (pen.); Le Garrec 45+5'; Bècho 90+10'

Sydney Football Stadium, Sydney
Attendance: 40,498
Referee: Laura Fortunato (Argentina)

Panama	France

GK	12	Yenith Bailey
RB	23	Carina Baltrip-Reyes
CB	3	Wendy Natis		(substituted off) 62'
CB	5	Yomira Pinzón	(yellow card) 66'
LB	2	Hilary Jaén
RM	7	Emily Cedeño		(substituted off) 58'
CM	14	Carmen Montenegro		(substituted off) 58'
CM	6	Deysiré Salazar		(substituted off) 46'
CM	20	Aldrith Quintero
LM	13	Riley Tanner		(substituted off) 81'
CF	10	Marta Cox (c)
Substitutions:
FW	19	Lineth Cedeño		(substituted in) 46'
MF	18	Erika Hernández		(substituted in) 58'
MF	8	Schiandra González		(substituted in) 58'
DF	16	Rebeca Espinosa		(substituted in) 62'
FW	11	Natalia Mills		(substituted in) 81'
Manager:
(Mexico) Ignacio Quintana

GK	16	Pauline Peyraud-Magnin
RB	22	Ève Périsset
CB	2	Maëlle Lakrar
CB	5	Élisa De Almeida
LB	20	Estelle Cascarino
RM	23	Vicki Bècho
CM	17	Léa Le Garrec
CM	8	Grace Geyoro (c)	(substituted off) 46'
LM	13	Selma Bacha	(substituted off) 46'
AM	12	Clara Matéo
CF	11	Kadidiatou Diani	(substituted off) 60'
Substitutions:
MF	10	Amel Majri	(substituted in) 46'
FW	18	Viviane Asseyi	(substituted in) 46'
MF	4	Laurina Fazer	(substituted in) 60'
Manager:
Hervé Renard

Player of the Match:
Kadidiatou Diani (France)

Assistant referees:
Mariana de Almeida (Argentina)
Daiana Milone (Argentina)
Fourth official:
Emikar Calderas Barrera (Venezuela)
Video assistant referee:
Alejandro Hernández Hernández (Spain)
Assistant video assistant referee:
Salomé di Iorio (Argentina)
Offside video assistant referee:
Shirley Perello (Honduras)

=== Jamaica vs Brazil ===
2 August 2023
20:00 UTC+10

Jamaica	0–0	Brazil
	Report

Melbourne Rectangular Stadium, Melbourne
Attendance: 27,638
Referee: Esther Staubli (Switzerland)

Jamaica	Brazil

GK	13	Rebecca Spencer
RB	19	Tiernny Wiltshire
CB	17	Allyson Swaby
CB	4	Chantelle Swaby
LB	14	Deneisha Blackwood
CM	3	Vyan Sampson
CM	8	Drew Spence
RW	21	Cheyna Matthews	(yellow card) 30'	(substituted off) 46'
AM	20	Atlanta Primus
LW	10	Jody Brown		(substituted off) 85'
CF	11	Khadija Shaw (c)
Substitutions:
FW	15	Tiffany Cameron		(substituted in) 46'
MF	2	Solai Washington		(substituted in) 85'
Manager:
Lorne Donaldson

GK	12	Letícia Izidoro
RB	2	Antônia	(substituted off) 81'
CB	3	Kathellen
CB	4	Rafaelle Souza
LB	6	Tamires
RM	17	Ary Borges	(substituted off) 46'
CM	21	Kerolin
CM	5	Luana	(substituted off) 81'
LM	11	Adriana
CF	9	Debinha
CF	10	Marta (c)	(substituted off) 81'
Substitutions:
FW	16	Bia Zaneratto	(substituted in) 46'
MF	15	Duda Sampaio	(substituted in) 81'
FW	7	Andressa Alves	(substituted in) 81'
FW	18	Geyse	(substituted in) 81'
Manager:
(Sweden) Pia Sundhage

Player of the Match:
Rebecca Spencer (Jamaica)

Assistant referees:
Katrin Rafalski (Germany)
Susanne Küng (Switzerland)
Fourth official:
Vincentia Amedome (Togo)
Video assistant referee:
Marco Fritz (Germany)
Assistant video assistant referee:
Pol van Boekel (Netherlands)
Offside video assistant referee:
Ella De Vries (Belgium)

== Discipline ==
Fair play points would have been used as tiebreakers in the group should the overall and head-to-head records of teams were tied. These were calculated based on yellow and red cards received in all group matches as follows:

- first yellow card: minus 1 point;
- indirect red card (second yellow card): minus 3 points;
- direct red card: minus 4 points;
- yellow card and direct red card: minus 5 points;

Only one of the above deductions was applied to a player in a single match.

Team	Match 1				Match 2				Match 3				Points
Team	Booked	(yellow card) (yellow-red card)	Sent off (straight red)	(yellow card) (red card)	Booked	(yellow card) (yellow-red card)	Sent off (straight red)	(yellow card) (red card)	Booked	(yellow card) (yellow-red card)	Sent off (straight red)	(yellow card) (red card)	Points
Brazil					1								−1
Panama					2				1				−3
France	1				3								−4
Jamaica	1	1			1				1				−6

== See also ==
- Brazil at the FIFA Women's World Cup
- France at the FIFA Women's World Cup
- Jamaica at the FIFA Women's World Cup
- Panama at the FIFA Women's World Cup
