= 2026 CONCACAF W Championship squads =

International football tournament squads

The 2026 CONCACAF W Championship is an international football tournament held in the United States, from 27 November to 5 December 2026. The 8 national teams involved in the tournament were required to register a squad of up to 23 players, including three goalkeepers. Only players in these squads were eligible to take part in the tournament. The final rosters were announced on 20 November 2026.

The position listed for each player is per the official squad list published by CONCACAF. The age listed for each player is as of 27 November 2026, the first day of the tournament. The numbers of caps and goals listed for each player do not include any matches played after the start of the tournament. The club listed is the club for which the player last played a competitive match prior to the tournament. (Note: This is the club a player was last able to play for during the previous season in the event a player did not play a competitive match.) The nationality for each club reflects the national association (not the league) to which the club is affiliated. A flag is included for coaches who are of a different nationality to their team.

== Canada ==
Coach: (England) Casey Stoney

Canada announced their final squad on 18 November.

No.	Pos.	Player	Date of birth (age)	Caps	Goals	Club
1	GK	Kailen Sheridan	16 July 1995 (aged 31)	71	0	(United States Soccer Federation) North Carolina Courage
18	GK	Sabrina D'Angelo	11 May 1993 (aged 33)	25	0	(Canadian Soccer Association) AFC Toronto
22	GK	Lysianne Proulx	17 April 1999 (aged 27)	3	0	(The Football Association) Ipswich Town
3	DF	Kadeisha Buchanan	5 November 1995 (aged 31)	159	6	(The Football Association) Chelsea
10	DF	Ashley Lawrence	11 June 1995 (aged 31)	154	8	(French Football Federation) Lyon
4	DF	Shelina Zadorsky	24 October 1992 (aged 34)	121	8	(Canadian Soccer Association) AFC Toronto
8	DF	Jayde Riviere	22 January 2001 (aged 25)	56	1	(The Football Association) Manchester United
2	DF	Gabrielle Carle	12 October 1998 (aged 28)	64	1	(United States Soccer Federation) Washington Spirit
12	DF	Jade Rose	12 February 2003 (aged 23)	43	1	(The Football Association) Manchester City
14	DF	Élisabeth Tsé	7 December 2002 (aged 23)	2	0	(United States Soccer Federation) Washington Spirit
16	DF	Janine Sonis	20 August 1994 (aged 32)	132	40	(United States Soccer Federation) Denver Summit
17	MF	Jessie Fleming (captain)	{11 March 1998 (aged 28)	159	20	(United States Soccer Federation) Portland Thorns
7	MF	Julia Grosso	29 August 2000 (aged 26)	86	5	(United States Soccer Federation) Chicago Stars
13	MF	Simi Awujo	23 September 2003 (aged 23)	37	1	(The Football Association) Manchester United
6	MF	Marie-Yasmine Alidou	28 April 1995 (aged 31)	24	6	(Canadian Soccer Association) Montreal Roses
5	MF	Emma Regan	28 January 2000 (aged 26)	23	1	(United States Soccer Federation) Denver Summit
15	MF	Carly Wickenheiser	6 March 1997 (aged 29)	8	0	(United States Soccer Federation) North Carolina Courage
19	FW	Annabelle Chukwu	8 February 2007 (aged 19)	7	2	(United States Soccer Federation) Notre Dame Fighting Irish
11	FW	Evelyne Viens	6 February 1997 (aged 29)	51	11	(French Football Federation) Paris FC
20	FW	Cloé Lacasse	7 July 1993 (aged 33)	48	6	(United States Soccer Federation) Utah Royals
9	FW	Olivia Smith	5 August 2004 (aged 22)	25	6	(The Football Association) Arsenal
21	FW	Delaney Baie Pridham	1 September 1997 (aged 29)	9	1	(Canadian Soccer Association) Ottawa Rapid
23	FW	Kaylee Hunter	22 January 2008 (aged 18)	4	0	(Canadian Soccer Association) AFC Toronto

== Costa Rica ==
Costa Rica announced their final squad on 19 November.

Head coach: (Brazil) Lindsay Camila

No.	Pos.	Player	Date of birth (age)	Caps	Goals	Club
1	GK	Noelia Bermúdez	20 September 1994 (aged 32)	30	0	(Mexican Football Federation) Club León
18	GK	Génesis Pérez	4 May 2005 (aged 21)	8	0	(Royal Spanish Football Federation) Atlético Madrid
23	GK	Daniela Solera	21 July 1997 (aged 29)	25	0	(Israel Football Association) Hapoel Jerusalem
8	DF	Daniela Cruz	8 March 1991 (aged 35)	90	2	(Costa Rican Football Federation) Saprissa
20	DF	Fabiola Villalobos	13 March 1998 (aged 28)	38	3	Unattached
2	DF	Gabriela Guillén	1 March 1992 (aged 34)	88	2	(Costa Rican Football Federation) Alajuelense
4	DF	Mariana Benavides	26 December 1994 (aged 31)	72	2	(Colombian Football Federation) Millonarios
3	DF	Marilenis Oporta	24 March 1998 (aged 28)	0	0	(Costa Rican Football Federation) Alajuelense
15	DF	Stephannie Blanco	13 December 2000 (aged 25)	11	1	(Costa Rican Football Federation) Sporting F.C.
5	DF	Valeria del Campo	15 December 2000 (aged 25)	14	0	(Mexican Football Federation) Monterrey
22	MF	Alexandra Pinell	18 October 2002 (aged 24)	5	0	(Costa Rican Football Federation) Alajuelense
13	MF	Emilie Valenciano	15 February 1997 (aged 29)	11	0	(Costa Rican Football Federation) Alajuelense
10	MF	Gloriana Villalobos	20 August 1999 (aged 27)	76	10	(Costa Rican Football Federation) Saprissa
16	MF	Katherine Alvarado	11 April 1991 (aged 35)	133	20	(Costa Rican Football Federation) Saprissa
6	MF	Lucía Paniagua	27 November 2009 (aged 17)	0	0	(Costa Rican Football Federation) Sporting F.C.
11	MF	Raquel Rodríguez	18 October 1993 (aged 33)	108	58	(United States Soccer Federation) Kansas City Current
21	MF	Sheika Scott	22 October 2006 (aged 20)	6	0	(French Football Federation) Paris FC
19	FW	Anna Gilbertson	9 August 1994 (aged 32)	0	0	(United States Soccer Federation) California Storm
12	FW	Lixy Rodríguez	4 November 1990 (aged 36)	50	2	(Costa Rican Football Federation) Alajuelense
7	FW	Melissa Herrera	10 October 1996 (age 30)	94	20	(Mexican Football Federation) FC Juárez
17	FW	Nubia Medina	7 August 2010 (aged 16)	0	0	(Costa Rican Football Federation) Surf Futbol
9	FW	Pamela Elizondo	11 January 2005 (aged 21)	0	0	(Costa Rican Football Federation) Sporting F.C.
14	FW	Priscila Chinchilla	11 July 2001 (age 25)	48	20	(Mexican Football Federation) Pumas

== El Salvador ==
El Salvador announced their final squad on 20 November.

Head coach: Eric Acuña

No.	Pos.	Player	Date of birth (age)	Caps	Goals	Club
1	GK	Idalia Serrano	22 August 1999 (aged 27)	31	0	(Hellenic Football Federation) Volos
18	GK	Riley Meléndez	17 June 2002 (aged 24)	5	0	(Mexican Football Federation) Atlante
21	GK	Jennifer Alvarado	6 January 2011 (aged 15)	0	0	(Salvadoran Football Federation) Inter Santa Tecla
2	DF	Juana Plata	7 February 2000 (aged 26)	27	1	(Mexican Football Federation) Querétaro
3	DF	Vasthy Delgado	26 May 1994 (aged 32)	27	0	(Mexican Football Federation) Atlas
4	DF	Elaily Hernández	27 May 2000 (aged 26)	35	0	(Mexican Football Federation) Atlético San Luis
5	DF	Andrea Amaya	16 February 2003 (aged 23)	36	2	(Argentine Football Association) Belgrano
8	DF	Victoria Sánchez	22 January 2005 (aged 21)	38	13	(United States Soccer Federation) Sam Houston State University
13	DF	Ashlin Fuentes	9 August 2004 (aged 22)	6	0	(United States Soccer Federation) Louisiana State University Shreveport
23	DF	Jasmine Dybala	19 May 2005 (aged 21)	3	1	(United States Soccer Federation) Sam Houston State University
6	MF	Alejandra Morales	23 August 1990 (aged 36)	36	0	(United States Soccer Federation) C.A. Internacional
7	MF	Danielle Fuentes	23 August 2000 (aged 26)	34	11	(Mexican Football Federation) Club Tijuana
11	MF	Samantha Fisher	26 August 1999 (aged 27)	4	1	(Italian Football Federation) Sassuolo
12	MF	Maggi Segovia	15 January 2001 (aged 25)	11	0	(Nicaraguan Football Federation) Managua
14	MF	Mya Ulloa	29 April 2002 (aged 24)	1	1	(United States Soccer Federation) Simply Futbol FC
15	MF	Danya Gutiérrez	12 February 2000 (aged 26)	32	12	(Mexican Football Federation) León
16	MF	Makenna Domínguez	19 June 2003 (aged 23)	12	1	(Hellenic Football Federation) AEK
19	MF	Laila Saravia	21 October 2001 (aged 25)	12	0	(Mexican Football Federation) Atlas
22	MF	Amber Marinero	17 June 1998 (aged 28)	10	1	(United States Soccer Federation) FC Premier Women
9	FW	Yoselyn López	16 March 2001 (aged 25)	22	11	(Mexican Football Federation) Puebla
10	FW	Brenda Cerén (captain)	24 September 1998 (aged 28)	45	30	(Mexican Football Federation) Cruz Azul
17	FW	Samaria Gómez	18 February 2002 (aged 24)	21	5	(Mexican Football Federation) Atlante
20	FW	Jackeline Velásquez	18 September 1995 (aged 31)	20	5	(Ecuadorian Football Federation) Universidad Católica

== Haiti ==
Haiti announced their final squad on 20 November.

Head coach: (Sweden) Pia Sundhage

No.	Pos.	Player	Date of birth (age)	Caps	Goals	Club
1	GK	Kaïna Cesar Pietrus	4 September 2005 (aged 21)			(United States Soccer Federation) UCF Knights
12	GK	Océane Toussaint	20 February 2004 (aged 22)			(French Football Federation) Paris Saint-Germain
23	GK	Naïla Louissaint	2 June 2005 (aged 21)			Unattached
2	DF	Nya Jean-Baptiste	6 July 2009 (aged 17)			(United States Soccer Federation) Concorde Fire
3	DF	Jennyfer Limage	25 December 1997 (aged 28)			(French Football Federation) RC Lens
4	DF	Tabita Joseph	13 September 2003 (aged 23)			(French Football Federation) Bourges FC
5	DF	Danique Ypema	20 November 1999 (aged 27)			(Royal Dutch Football Association) Hera United
14	DF	Amandine Pierre-Louis	18 February 1995 (aged 31)			Unattached
16	DF	Claire Constant	13 October 1999 (aged 27)			(United States Soccer Federation) DC Power
20	DF	Kethna Louis	5 August 1996 (aged 30)			(French Football Federation) FC Fleury 91
22	DF	Chelsea Surpris	20 December 1996 (aged 29)	13	2	(German Football Association) SC Sand
6	MF	Melchie Dumornay	17 August 2003 (aged 23)			(French Football Federation) OL Lyonnes
9	MF	Sherly Jeudy	13 October 1998 (aged 28)			(French Football Federation) OGC Nice
13	MF	Jasmine Vilgrain	25 July 2002 (aged 24)			Unattached
21	MF	Anyssa Ibrahim	8 February 1999 (aged 27)			(French Football Federation) Le Mans FC
7	FW	Batcheba Louis	15 June 1997 (aged 29)			(French Football Federation) FC Fleury 91
8	FW	Brittany Raphino	28 October 2000 (aged 26)			(Italian Football Federation) Inter Milan
10	FW	Nérilia Mondésir	17 January 1999 (aged 27)			(United States Soccer Federation) Seattle Reign
11	FW	Roseline Éloissaint	20 February 1999 (aged 27)			(French Football Federation) RC Lens
15	FW	Darlina Joseph	15 December 2003 (aged 22)			(French Football Federation) Bourges FC
17	FW	Chelsea Domond	19 December 1999 (aged 26)			(Hellenic Football Federation) Panathinaikos
18	FW	Lourdjina Étienne	14 July 2007 (aged 19)			(French Football Federation) Bourges FC
19	MF	Dayana Pierre-Louis	24 September 2003 (aged 23)			(United States Soccer Federation) Utah Royals

== Jamaica ==
Jamaica announced their final squad on 20 November.

Head coach: Hubert Busby Jr.

No.	Pos.	Player	Date of birth (age)	Caps	Goals	Club
1	GK	Aliyah Morgan	28 September 2004 (aged 22)	1	0	(United States Soccer Federation) Anderson Trojans
13	GK	Becky Spencer	22 February 1991 (aged 35)	26	0	(The Football Association) Chelsea
23	GK	Liya Brooks	17 May 2005 (aged 21)	5	0	(United States Soccer Federation) North Carolina Tar Heels
3	DF	Naya Cardoza	2 November 2004 (aged 22)	10	1	(Canadian Soccer Association) Halifax Tides
4	DF	Tianna Harris	7 February 2000 (aged 26)	5	1	(Football Australia) Adelaide United
5	DF	Konya Plummer	2 August 1997 (aged 29)	42	3	(Turkish Football Federation) Fenerbahçe
14	DF	Deneisha Blackwood	7 March 1997 (aged 29)	50	12	(Mexican Football Federation) Toluca
17	DF	Allyson Swaby	3 October 1996 (aged 30)	47	2	(The Football Association) Crystal Palace
19	DF	Kameron Simmonds	6 December 2003 (aged 22)	13	1	(United States Soccer Federation) Utah Royals
2	MF	Mimi Van Zanten	25 January 2005 (aged 21)	8	0	(United States Soccer Federation) San Diego Wave
6	MF	Nikayla Small	24 March 2003 (aged 23)	0	0	(Canadian Soccer Association) AFC Toronto
8	MF	Drew Spence	23 October 1992 (aged 34)	29	4	(The Football Association) Tottenham Hotspur
16	MF	Peyton McNamara	22 February 2002 (aged 24)	8	0	Unattached
18	MF	Trudi Carter	18 November 1994 (aged 32)	36	16	(Mexican Football Federation) Club Tijuana
20	MF	Atlanta Primus	21 April 1997 (aged 29)	25	1	(The Football Association) Sunderland
7	FW	Shania Hayles	22 December 1999 (aged 26)	10	3	(The Football Association) Nottingham Forest
9	FW	Kayla McKenna	3 September 1996 (aged 30)	24	5	(Swiss Football Association) Grasshopper
10	MF	Jody Brown	16 April 2002 (aged 24)	48	21	(French Football Federation) Marseille
11	FW	Khadija Shaw	31 January 1997 (aged 29)	49	67	(The Football Association) Manchester City
12	FW	Kiki Van Zanten	25 August 2001 (aged 25)	17	4	(United States Soccer Federation) Houston Dash
15	FW	Natasha Thomas	19 December 1995 (aged 30)	7	3	(Football Association of Wales) Wrexham
21	FW	Shaneil Buckley	20 May 2005 (aged 21)	10	2	(United States Soccer Federation) Florida State Seminoles
22	FW	Solai Washington	1 October 2005 (aged 21)	11	1	(United States Soccer Federation) Orlando Pride

== Mexico ==
Mexico announced their final squad on 16 November.

Head coach: (Spain) Pedro López

No.	Pos.	Player	Date of birth (age)	Caps	Goals	Club
1	GK	Itzel Velasco	23 September 2004 (aged 22)	2	0	(Mexican Football Federation) América
12	GK	Blanca Félix	25 March 1996 (aged 30)	3	0	(Mexican Football Federation) Guadalajara
21	GK	Esthefanny Barreras	2 November 1996 (aged 30)	34	0	(Mexican Football Federation) Pachuca
2	DF	Kenti Robles	15 February 1991 (aged 35)	115	3	(Mexican Football Federation) Pachuca
4	DF	Rebeca Bernal	31 August 1997 (aged 29)	82	10	(The Football Association) Manchester United
6	DF	Reyna Reyes	16 February 2001 (aged 25)	29	0	(United States Soccer Federation) Portland Thorns
13	DF	Ana Mendoza	7 August 2005 (aged 21)	3	0	(Mexican Football Federation) UNAM
17	DF	Alexandra Godínez	16 May 2003 (aged 23)	1	0	(Mexican Football Federation) Monterrey
23	DF	Kimberly Rodríguez	26 March 1999 (aged 27)	36	2	(Mexican Football Federation) América
3	MF	Aaliyah Farmer	27 October 2003 (aged 23)	5	1	(United States Soccer Federation) Chicago Stars
7	MF	Alice Soto	26 March 2006 (aged 20)	21	8	(Mexican Football Federation) Monterrey
8	MF	Alexia Delgado	9 December 1999 (aged 26)	62	5	(Mexican Football Federation) Tigres UANL
11	MF	Lizbeth Ovalle	19 October 1999 (aged 27)	72	27	(United States Soccer Federation) Orlando Pride
14	MF	Maricarmen Reyes	23 April 2000 (aged 26)	15	8	(Mexican Football Federation) Tigres UANL
16	MF	Karla Nieto	9 January 1995 (aged 31)	71	1	(Mexican Football Federation) Pachuca
18	MF	Nancy Antonio	2 April 1996 (aged 30)	27	1	(Mexican Football Federation) América
19	MF	Montserrat Saldívar	20 September 2006 (aged 20)	15	3	(Mexican Football Federation) América
5	FW	Scarlett Camberos	20 November 2000 (aged 26)	32	7	(Mexican Football Federation) América
9	FW	Charlyn Corral	11 September 1991 (aged 35)	87	47	(Mexican Football Federation) Pachuca
10	FW	Kiana Palacios	1 October 1996 (aged 30)	60	15	(United States Soccer Federation) Utah Royals
15	FW	Jasmine Casarez	7 January 1997 (aged 29)	26	6	(Mexican Football Federation) Guadalajara
20	FW	Nicolette Hernández	17 February 1999 (aged 27)	34	1	(United States Soccer Federation) Boston Legacy
22	FW	Diana Ordóñez	26 September 2001 (aged 25)	40	16	(Mexican Football Federation) Tigres UANL

== Panama ==
Panama announced their final squad on 19 November.

Head coach: (Spain) Toña Is

No.	Pos.	Player	Date of birth (age)	Caps	Goals	Club
1	GK	Farissa Córdoba	30 June 1989 (aged 37)	4	0	(Panamanian Football Federation) UMECIT FC
12	GK	Yenith Bailey	29 March 2001 (aged 25)	13	0	(Panamanian Football Federation) Inter Panama CF
22	GK	Maria Cervantes	22 August 2001 (aged 25)	13	0	(Panamanian Football Federation) SD Atlético Nacional
2	DF	Hilary Jaén	29 August 2002 (aged 24)			(Football Association of the Czech Republic) SK Slavia Prague
3	DF	Wendy Natis	19 August 2002 (aged 24)	8	0	(Norwegian Football Federation) Kolbotn
4	DF	Katherine Castillo	23 March 1996 (aged 30)	16	1	(Argentine Football Association) San Lorenzo
16	DF	Rebeca Espinosa	5 July 1992 (aged 34)	9	0	(Panamanian Football Federation) CD Plaza Amador
17	DF	Arlén Hernández	1 December 1995 (aged 30)			(Panamanian Football Federation) CD Plaza Amador
23	DF	Carina Baltrip Reyes	1 August 1998 (aged 28)	30	0	(French Football Federation) Olympique de Marseille
6	MF	Deysiré Salazar	4 May 2004 (aged 22)	18	1	(Panamanian Football Federation) CD Origen
8	MF	Schiandra González	4 July 1995 (aged 31)	11	1	(Panamanian Football Federation) UMECIT FC
9	MF	Karla Riley	18 September 1997 (aged 29)	33	19	(Football Federation of Chile) Club Universidad de Chile
14	MF	Carmen Montenegro	5 December 2000 (aged 25)		1	(Panamanian Football Federation) Inter Panama CF
15	MF	Noémie Potier	12 September 2005 (aged 21)			(French Football Federation) Nantes
20	MF	Aldrith Quintero	1 January 2002 (aged 24)	7	1	(Israel Football Association) F.C. Kiryat Gat
5	FW	Analía Arosemena	24 May 2008 (aged 18)			(Panamanian Football Federation) Umecit FC
7	FW	Ericka Araúz	20 July 2003 (aged 23)	0	0	(National Football Federation of Guatemala) Unifut
10	FW	Sherline King	3 March 2006 (aged 20)	6	2	(United States Soccer Federation) Oklahoma State University
11	FW	Emily Cedeño	22 November 2003 (aged 23)			(Panamanian Football Federation) CD Origen
13	FW	Riley Tanner	15 October 1999 (aged 27)	19	6	(Football Australia) Sydney FC
18	FW	Shayari Camarena	13 October 2003 (aged 23)	1	1	(Panamanian Football Federation) CD Plaza Amador
19	FW	Lineth Cedeño	5 December 2000 (aged 25)	48	16	(German Football Association) Turbine Potsdam
21	FW	Ana Quintero	14 August 2004 (aged 22)	6	1	(United States Soccer Federation) University of South Florida

== United States ==
United States announced their final squad on 18 November.

Head coach: (England) Emma Hayes

No.	Pos.	Player	Date of birth (age)	Caps	Goals	Club
1	GK	Claudia Dickey	6 January 2000 (aged 26)	12	0	(United States Soccer Federation) Seattle Reign FC
22	GK	Phallon Tullis-Joyce	19 October 1996 (aged 30)	8	0	(The Football Association) Manchester United
18	GK	Mandy McGlynn	3 November 1998 (aged 28)	6	0	(United States Soccer Federation) Utah Royals
23	DF	Emily Fox	5 July 1998 (aged 28)	80	1	(The Football Association) Arsenal
12	DF	Tierna Davidson	{19 September 1998 (aged 28)	72	3	(United States Soccer Federation) Gotham FC
3	DF	Avery Patterson	14 June 2002 (aged 24)	15	1	(United States Soccer Federation) Houston Dash
19	DF	Gisele Thompson	{2 December 2005 (aged 20)	13	0	(United States Soccer Federation) Angel City FC
5	DF	Tara Rudd	{2 July 1999 (aged 27)	12	0	(United States Soccer Federation) Washington Spirit
4	DF	Kennedy Wesley	8 March 2001 (aged 25)	9	1	(United States Soccer Federation) San Diego Wave FC
13	DF	Kate Del Fava	23 July 1998 (aged 28)	1	0	(United States Soccer Federation) Utah Royals
14	DF	Evelyn Shores	29 December 2004 (aged 21)	0	0	(United States Soccer Federation) Angel City FC
10	MF	Lindsey Heaps (captain)	26 May 1994 (aged 32)	180	40	(United States Soccer Federation) Denver Summit FC
16	MF	Rose Lavelle	14 May 1995 (aged 31)	124	29	(United States Soccer Federation) Gotham FC
17	MF	Sam Coffey	31 December 1998 (aged 27)	46	5	(The Football Association) Manchester City
15	MF	Claire Hutton	11 January 2006 (aged 20)	22	1	(United States Soccer Federation) Bay FC
6	MF	Lily Yohannes	12 June 2007 (aged 19)	22	1	(French Football Federation) Lyon
8	MF	Croix Bethune	14 March 2001 (aged 25)	7	1	(United States Soccer Federation) Kansas City Current
9	FW	Mallory Swanson	29 April 1998 (aged 28)	105	39	(United States Soccer Federation) Chicago Stars
11	FW	Sophia Wilson	10 August 2000 (aged 26)	65	25	(United States Soccer Federation) Portland Thorns FC
2	FW	Trinity Rodman	20 May 2002 (aged 24)	59	13	(United States Soccer Federation) Washington Spirit
21	FW	Alyssa Thompson	7 November 2004 (aged 22)	34	4	(The Football Association) Chelsea
7	FW	Ashley Sanchez	16 March 1999 (aged 27)	30	4	(United States Soccer Federation) North Carolina Courage
20	FW	Michelle Cooper	4 December 2002 (aged 23)	16	1	(United States Soccer Federation) Kansas City Current

== Statistics ==
=== Player representation by club ===
Players	Clubs
6	(Mexican Football Federation) América
4	(Mexican Football Federation) Pachuca (United States Soccer Federation) Washington Spirit
3	(Canadian Soccer Association) AFC Toronto (Mexican Football Federation) UANL (United States Soccer Federation) Kansas City Current
