= Panama at the FIFA Women's World Cup =

The Panama women's national football team has represented Panama at the FIFA Women's World Cup on one occasion in 2023.

== 2023 World Cup ==
=== Group F ===
Pos	Team	Pld	W	D	L	GF	GA	GD	Pts	Qualification
1	France	3	2	1	0	8	4	+4	7	Advance to knockout stage
2	Jamaica	3	1	2	0	1	0	+1	5	Advance to knockout stage
3	Brazil	3	1	1	1	5	2	+3	4	
4	Panama	3	0	0	3	3	11	−8	0	

Source: FIFA
24 July 2023
20:30 UTC+9:30

Brazil	4–0	Panama
Ary Borges 19', 39', 70'; Bia Zaneratto 48'	Report

Hindmarsh Stadium, Adelaide
Attendance: 13,142
Referee: Cheryl Foster (Wales)

29 July 2023
20:30 UTC+8

Panama	0–1	Jamaica
	Report	A. Swaby 56'

Perth Rectangular Stadium, Perth
Attendance: 15,987
Referee: Kateryna Monzul (Ukraine)

2 August 2023
20:00 UTC+10

Panama	3–6	France
Cox 2'; Pinzón 64' (pen.); L. Cedeño 87'	Report	Lakrar 21'; Diani 28', 37' (pen.), 52' (pen.); Le Garrec 45+5'; Bècho 90+10'

Sydney Football Stadium, Sydney
Attendance: 40,498
Referee: Laura Fortunato (Argentina)

== FIFA World Cup record ==
FIFA Women's World Cup record
Year	Result	Pld	W	D*	L	GF	GA
(China) 1991	Did not enter						
(Sweden) 1995	Did not enter						
(United States) 1999	Did not enter						
(United States) 2003	Did not qualify						
(China) 2007	Did not qualify						
(Germany) 2011	Did not enter						
(Canada) 2015	Did not qualify						
(France) 2019	Did not qualify						
(Australia) (New Zealand) 2023	Group stage	3	0	0	3	3	11
(Brazil) 2027	To be determined						
(Costa Rica) (Jamaica) (Mexico) (United States) 2031	To be determined						
(United Kingdom) 2035	To be determined						
Total	1/12	3	0	0	3	3	11

*Draws include knockout matches decided on penalty kicks.

== Goalscorers ==
Player	Goals	2023
Lineth Cedeño	1	1
Marta Cox	1	1
Yomira Pinzón	1	1
Total	3	3

== Head-to-head record ==
Opponent	Pld	W	D	L	GF	GA	GD	Win %
Brazil	1	0	0	1	0	4	−4	0.00
France	1	0	0	1	3	6	−3	0.00
Jamaica	1	0	0	1	0	1	−1	0.00
Total	3	0	0	3	3	11	−8	0.00
