= Jamaica at the FIFA Women's World Cup =

The Jamaica women's national football team has represented Jamaica at the FIFA Women's World Cup at two stagings of the tournament, in 2019 and 2023.

== FIFA Women's World Cup record ==
World Cup Finals
Year	Result	GP	W	D*	L	GF	GA	GD
(China) 1991	Did not qualify							
(Sweden) 1995	Did not qualify							
(United States) 1999	Did not enter							
(United States) 2003	Did not qualify							
(China) 2007	Did not qualify							
(Germany) 2011	Did not enter							
(Canada) 2015	Did not qualify							
(France) 2019	Group stage	3	0	0	3	1	12	−11
(Australia) (New Zealand) 2023	Round of 16	4	1	2	1	1	1	0
(Brazil) 2027	To be determined							
(Costa Rica) (Jamaica) (Mexico) (United States) 2031	Qualified							
(United Kingdom) 2035	To be determined							
Total	3/12	7	1	2	4	2	13	−11

*Draws include knockout matches decided on penalty kicks.

FIFA Women's World Cup history
Year	Round	Date	Opponent	Result	Stadium
(France) 2019	Group stage	9 June	Brazil	L 0–3	Stade des Alpes, Grenoble
(France) 2019	Group stage	14 June	Italy	L 0–5	Stade Auguste-Delaune, Reims
(France) 2019	Group stage	18 June	Australia	L 1–4	Stade des Alpes, Grenoble
(Australia) (New Zealand) 2023	Group stage	23 July	France	D 0–0	Sydney Football Stadium, Sydney
(Australia) (New Zealand) 2023	Group stage	29 July	Panama	W 1–0	Perth Rectangular Stadium, Perth
(Australia) (New Zealand) 2023	Group stage	2 August	Brazil	D 0–0	Melbourne Rectangular Stadium, Melbourne
(Australia) (New Zealand) 2023	Round of 16	8 August	Colombia	L 0–1	Melbourne Rectangular Stadium, Melbourne

== 2019 FIFA Women's World Cup ==
=== Group C ===
Pos	Team	Pld	W	D	L	GF	GA	GD	Pts	Qualification
1	Italy	3	2	0	1	7	2	+5	6	Advance to knockout stage
2	Australia	3	2	0	1	8	5	+3	6	Advance to knockout stage
3	Brazil	3	2	0	1	6	3	+3	6	Advance to knockout stage
4	Jamaica	3	0	0	3	1	12	−11	0	

Source: FIFA
Rules for classification: Group stage tiebreakers
9 June 2019
15:30

Brazil	3–0	Jamaica
Cristiane 15', 50', 64'	Report

Stade des Alpes, Grenoble
Attendance: 17,668
Referee: Riem Hussein (Germany)
14 June 2019
18:00

Jamaica	0–5	Italy
	Report	Girelli 12' (pen.), 25', 46'; Galli 71', 81'

Stade Auguste-Delaune, Reims
Attendance: 12,016
Referee: Anna-Marie Keighley (New Zealand)
18 June 2019
21:00

Jamaica	1–4	Australia
Solaun 49'	Report	Kerr 11', 42', 69', 83'

Stade des Alpes, Grenoble
Attendance: 17,402
Referee: Katalin Kulcsár (Hungary)

== 2023 FIFA Women's World Cup ==
=== Group F ===
Pos	Team	Pld	W	D	L	GF	GA	GD	Pts	Qualification
1	France	3	2	1	0	8	4	+4	7	Advance to knockout stage
2	Jamaica	3	1	2	0	1	0	+1	5	Advance to knockout stage
3	Brazil	3	1	1	1	5	2	+3	4	
4	Panama	3	0	0	3	3	11	−8	0	

Source: FIFA
Rules for classification: Group stage tiebreakers
23 July 2023
20:00 UTC+10

France	0–0	Jamaica
	Report

Sydney Football Stadium, Sydney
Attendance: 39,045
Referee: María Carvajal (Chile)

29 July 2023
20:30 UTC+8

Panama	0–1	Jamaica
	Report	A. Swaby 56'

Perth Rectangular Stadium, Perth
Attendance: 15,987
Referee: Kateryna Monzul (Ukraine)

2 August 2023
20:00 UTC+10

Jamaica	0–0	Brazil
	Report

Melbourne Rectangular Stadium, Melbourne
Attendance: 27,638
Referee: Esther Staubli (Switzerland)

=== Round of 16 ===
8 August 2023
18:00 UTC+10

Colombia	1–0	Jamaica
Usme 51'	Report

Melbourne Rectangular Stadium, Melbourne
Attendance: 27,706
Referee: Kate Jacewicz (Australia)

== Goalscorers ==
Player	Goals	2019	2023
Havana Solaun	1	1	
Allyson Swaby	1		1
Total	2	1	1

== Head-to-head record ==
Opponent	Pld	W	D	L	GF	GA	GD	Win %
Australia	1	0	0	1	1	4	−3	0.00
Brazil	2	0	1	1	0	3	−3	0.00
Colombia	1	0	0	1	0	1	−1	0.00
France	1	0	1	0	0	0	+0	0.00
Italy	1	0	0	1	0	5	−5	0.00
Panama	1	1	0	0	1	0	+1	100.00
Total	7	1	2	4	2	13	−11	14.29
