= 2019 FIFA Women's World Cup Group C =

Football tournament group stage

Group C of the 2019 FIFA Women's World Cup took place from 9 to 18 June 2019. The group consisted of Australia, Brazil, Italy and Jamaica. The top two teams, Italy and Australia, along with the third-placed team, Brazil (as one of the four best third-placed teams), advanced to the round of 16.

== Teams ==
Draw position	Team	Pot	Confederation	Method of qualification	Date of qualification	Finals appearance	Last appearance	Previous best performance	FIFA Rankings	
Draw position	Team	Pot	Confederation	Method of qualification	Date of qualification	Finals appearance	Last appearance	Previous best performance	December 2018 (Note: The rankings of December 2018 were used for seeding for the final draw.)	March 2019
C1	Australia	1	AFC	AFC Women's Asian Cup runners-up	13 April 2018	7th	2015	Quarter-finals (2007, 2011, 2015)	6	6
C2	Italy	3	UEFA	UEFA Group 6 winners	8 June 2018	3rd	1999	Quarter-finals (1991)	16	15
C3	Brazil	2	CONMEBOL	Copa América Femenina champions	19 April 2018	8th	2015	Runners-up (2007)	10	10
C4	Jamaica	4	CONCACAF	CONCACAF Women's Championship 3rd place	17 October 2018	1st	—	Debut	53	53

== Standings ==
Pos	Team	Pld	W	D	L	GF	GA	GD	Pts	Qualification
1	Italy	3	2	0	1	7	2	+5	6	Advance to knockout stage
2	Australia	3	2	0	1	8	5	+3	6	Advance to knockout stage
3	Brazil	3	2	0	1	6	3	+3	6	Advance to knockout stage
4	Jamaica	3	0	0	3	1	12	−11	0	

Source: FIFA
Rules for classification: Group stage tiebreakers

In the round of 16:

- The winners of Group C, Italy, advanced to play the third-placed team of Group B, China.
- The runners-up of Group C, Australia, advanced to play the runners-up of Group A, Norway.
- The third-placed team of Group C, Brazil, advanced to play the winners of Group A, France (as one of the four best third-placed teams).

== Matches ==
All times listed are local, CEST (UTC+2).

=== Australia vs Italy ===
9 June 2019
13:00

Australia	1–2	Italy
Kerr 22'	Report	Bonansea 56', 90+5'

Stade du Hainaut, Valenciennes
Attendance: 15,380
Referee: Melissa Borjas (Honduras)

Australia	Italy

GK	1	Lydia Williams
RB	7	Steph Catley
CB	14	Alanna Kennedy
CB	4	Clare Polkinghorne
LB	21	Ellie Carpenter
DM	10	Emily van Egmond
CM	13	Tameka Yallop		(substituted off) 83'
CM	6	Chloe Logarzo		(substituted off) 61'
RM	16	Hayley Raso		(substituted off) 69'
LM	9	Caitlin Foord
CF	20	Sam Kerr (c)
Substitutions:
FW	11	Lisa De Vanna	(yellow card) 76'	(substituted on) 61'
MF	19	Katrina Gorry		(substituted on) 69'
MF	8	Elise Kellond-Knight		(substituted on) 83'
Manager:
Ante Milicic

GK	1	Laura Giuliani
RB	2	Valentina Bergamaschi		(substituted off) 77'
CB	3	Sara Gama (c)	(yellow card) 21'
CB	5	Elena Linari
LB	7	Alia Guagni
CM	4	Aurora Galli		(substituted off) 46'
CM	23	Manuela Giugliano
CM	21	Valentina Cernoia	(yellow card) 70'
RF	18	Ilaria Mauro		(substituted off) 58'
CF	10	Cristiana Girelli	(yellow card) 63'
LF	11	Barbara Bonansea
Substitutions:
DF	13	Elisa Bartoli		(substituted on) 46'
FW	9	Daniela Sabatino		(substituted on) 58'
FW	19	Valentina Giacinti		(substituted on) 77'
Manager:
Milena Bertolini

Player of the Match:
Barbara Bonansea (Italy)

Assistant referees:
Shirley Perello (Honduras)
Felisha Mariscal (United States)
Fourth official:
Katja Koroleva (United States)
Reserve assistant referee:
Enedina Caudillo (Mexico)
Video assistant referee:
Carlos del Cerro Grande (Spain)
Assistant video assistant referees:
José María Sánchez Martínez (Spain)
Luciana Mascaraña (Uruguay)

=== Brazil vs Jamaica ===
9 June 2019
15:30

Brazil	3–0	Jamaica
Cristiane 15', 50', 64'	Report

Stade des Alpes, Grenoble
Attendance: 17,668
Referee: Riem Hussein (Germany)

Brazil	Jamaica

GK	1	Bárbara
RB	13	Letícia Santos
CB	14	Kathellen		(substituted off) 76'
CB	21	Mônica (c)
LB	6	Tamires
RM	7	Andressa Alves
CM	8	Formiga	(yellow card) 58'
CM	5	Thaisa
LM	9	Debinha
CF	16	Beatriz		(substituted off) 65'
CF	11	Cristiane		(substituted off) 65'
Substitutions:
FW	23	Geyse		(substituted on) 65'
FW	19	Ludmila		(substituted on) 65'
DF	3	Daiane Limeira	(yellow card) 82'	(substituted on) 76'
Manager:
Vadão

GK	1	Sydney Schneider
RB	16	Dominique Bond-Flasza
CB	5	Konya Plummer (c)	(yellow card) 17'
CB	17	Allyson Swaby
LB	14	Deneisha Blackwood
CM	4	Chantelle Swaby
CM	6	Havana Solaun		(substituted off) 72'
CM	9	Marlo Sweatman
RF	20	Cheyna Matthews		(substituted off) 62'
CF	11	Khadija Shaw
LF	18	Trudi Carter		(substituted off) 79'
Substitutions:
FW	10	Jody Brown		(substituted on) 62'
MF	7	Chinyelu Asher		(substituted on) 72'
FW	15	Tiffany Cameron		(substituted on) 79'
Manager:
Hue Menzies

Player of the Match:
Cristiane (Brazil)

Assistant referees:
Kylie Cockburn (Scotland)
Mihaela Țepușă (Romania)
Fourth official:
Kateryna Monzul (Ukraine)
Reserve assistant referee:
Petruța Iugulescu (Romania)
Video assistant referee:
Bastian Dankert (Germany)
Assistant video assistant referees:
Sascha Stegemann (Germany)
Maryna Striletska (Ukraine)

=== Australia vs Brazil ===
13 June 2019
18:00

Australia	3–2	Brazil
Foord 45+1'; Logarzo 58'; Mônica 66' (o.g.)	Report	Marta 27' (pen.); Cristiane 38'

Stade de la Mosson, Montpellier
Attendance: 17,032
Referee: Esther Staubli (Switzerland)

Australia	Brazil

GK	1	Lydia Williams
RB	21	Ellie Carpenter
CB	14	Alanna Kennedy
CB	7	Steph Catley
LB	8	Elise Kellond-Knight
CM	13	Tameka Yallop
CM	10	Emily van Egmond
CM	6	Chloe Logarzo
RF	15	Emily Gielnik	(substituted off) 72'
CF	20	Sam Kerr (c)
LF	9	Caitlin Foord	(substituted off) 90+5'
Substitutions:
FW	16	Hayley Raso	(substituted on) 72'
DF	5	Karly Roestbakken	(substituted on) 90+5'
Manager:
Ante Milicic

GK	1	Bárbara
RB	13	Letícia Santos
CB	14	Kathellen
CB	21	Mônica
LB	6	Tamires
RM	9	Debinha
CM	8	Formiga	(yellow card) 14'	(substituted off) 46'
CM	5	Thaisa
LM	7	Andressa Alves	(yellow card) 85'
CF	11	Cristiane		(substituted off) 75'
CF	10	Marta (c)		(substituted off) 46'
Substitutions:
FW	19	Ludmila		(substituted on) 46'
MF	18	Luana	(yellow card) 87'	(substituted on) 46'
FW	16	Beatriz		(substituted on) 75'
Manager:
Vadão

Player of the Match:
Chloe Logarzo (Australia)

Assistant referees:
Sian Massey-Ellis (England)
Susanne Küng (Switzerland)
Fourth official:
Stéphanie Frappart (France)
Reserve assistant referee:
Lidwine Rakotozafinoro (Madagascar)
Video assistant referee:
Bastian Dankert (Germany)
Assistant video assistant referees:
Sascha Stegemann (Germany)
Lucie Ratajová (Czech Republic)

=== Jamaica vs Italy ===
14 June 2019
18:00

Jamaica	0–5	Italy
	Report	Girelli 12' (pen.), 25', 46'; Galli 71', 81'

Stade Auguste-Delaune, Reims
Attendance: 12,016
Referee: Anna-Marie Keighley (New Zealand)

Jamaica	Italy

GK	1	Sydney Schneider	(yellow card) 12'
RB	12	Sashana Campbell
CB	5	Konya Plummer (c)
CB	17	Allyson Swaby
LB	14	Deneisha Blackwood
RM	21	Olufolasade Adamolekun		(substituted off) 76'
CM	6	Havana Solaun
CM	4	Chantelle Swaby		(substituted off) 46'
LM	7	Chinyelu Asher
CF	11	Khadija Shaw	(yellow card) 59'
CF	22	Mireya Grey		(substituted off) 66'
Substitutions:
MF	9	Marlo Sweatman		(substituted on) 46'
FW	10	Jody Brown		(substituted on) 66'
DF	2	Lauren Silver		(substituted on) 76'
Manager:
Hue Menzies

GK	1	Laura Giuliani
RB	7	Alia Guagni	(substituted off) 57'
CB	3	Sara Gama (c)
CB	5	Elena Linari
LB	13	Elisa Bartoli
CM	2	Valentina Bergamaschi	(substituted off) 65'
CM	23	Manuela Giugliano
CM	21	Valentina Cernoia
RF	9	Daniela Sabatino
CF	10	Cristiana Girelli	(substituted off) 72'
LF	11	Barbara Bonansea
Substitutions:
DF	17	Lisa Boattin	(substituted on) 57'
MF	4	Aurora Galli	(substituted on) 65'
FW	19	Valentina Giacinti	(substituted on) 72'
Manager:
Milena Bertolini

Player of the Match:
Cristiana Girelli (Italy)

Assistant referees:
Sarah Jones (New Zealand)
Maria Salamasina (Samoa)
Fourth official:
Claudia Umpiérrez (Uruguay)
Reserve assistant referee:
Mónica Amboya (Ecuador)
Video assistant referee:
Danny Makkelie (Netherlands)
Assistant video assistant referees:
Paweł Gil (Poland)
Chrysoula Kourompylia (Greece)

=== Jamaica vs Australia ===
18 June 2019
21:00

Jamaica	1–4	Australia
Solaun 49'	Report	Kerr 11', 42', 69', 83'

Stade des Alpes, Grenoble
Attendance: 17,402
Referee: Katalin Kulcsár (Hungary)

Jamaica	Australia

GK	13	Nicole McClure
RB	12	Sashana Campbell
CB	5	Konya Plummer (c)	(yellow card) 71'
CB	17	Allyson Swaby
LB	14	Deneisha Blackwood
CM	4	Chantelle Swaby
CM	11	Khadija Shaw
CM	19	Toriana Patterson
RF	22	Mireya Grey		(substituted off) 72'
CF	20	Cheyna Matthews		(substituted off) 59'
LF	15	Tiffany Cameron		(substituted off) 46'
Substitutions:
MF	6	Havana Solaun		(substituted on) 46'
MF	18	Trudi Carter		(substituted on) 59'
FW	10	Jody Brown		(substituted on) 72'
Manager:
Hue Menzies

GK	1	Lydia Williams
RB	21	Ellie Carpenter
CB	14	Alanna Kennedy
CB	7	Steph Catley
LB	5	Karly Roestbakken
DM	10	Emily van Egmond	(yellow card) 76'
CM	6	Chloe Logarzo
CM	19	Katrina Gorry		(substituted off) 87'
RM	15	Emily Gielnik		(substituted off) 59'
LM	11	Lisa De Vanna		(substituted off) 63'
CF	20	Sam Kerr (c)
Substitutions:
FW	9	Caitlin Foord		(substituted on) 59'
FW	16	Hayley Raso		(substituted on) 63'
MF	3	Aivi Luik		(substituted on) 87'
Manager:
Ante Milicic

Player of the Match:
Sam Kerr (Australia)

Assistant referees:
Katalin Török (Hungary)
Sanja Rođak-Karšić (Croatia)
Fourth official:
Jana Adámková (Czech Republic)
Reserve assistant referee:
Mária Súkeníková (Slovakia)
Video assistant referee:
José María Sánchez Martínez (Spain)
Assistant video assistant referees:
Mohammed Abdulla Hassan Mohamed (United Arab Emirates)
Sian Massey-Ellis (England)

=== Italy vs Brazil ===
18 June 2019
21:00

Italy	0–1	Brazil
	Report	Marta 74' (pen.)

Stade du Hainaut, Valenciennes
Attendance: 21,669
Referee: Lucila Venegas (Mexico)

Italy	Brazil

GK	1	Laura Giuliani
RB	7	Alia Guagni
CB	3	Sara Gama (c)
CB	5	Elena Linari
LB	13	Elisa Bartoli	(yellow card) 15'	(substituted off) 71'
CM	4	Aurora Galli
CM	23	Manuela Giugliano
CM	21	Valentina Cernoia
RF	19	Valentina Giacinti		(substituted off) 63'
CF	10	Cristiana Girelli		(substituted off) 78'
LF	11	Barbara Bonansea
Substitutions:
MF	2	Valentina Bergamaschi		(substituted on) 63'
DF	17	Lisa Boattin		(substituted on) 71'
FW	18	Ilaria Mauro		(substituted on) 78'
Manager:
Milena Bertolini

GK	1	Bárbara
RB	13	Letícia Santos	(yellow card) 13'	(substituted off) 76'
CB	14	Kathellen	(yellow card) 90+4'
CB	21	Mônica
LB	6	Tamires
DM	5	Thaisa
CM	17	Andressinha
CM	10	Marta (c)		(substituted off) 84'
RM	19	Ludmila
LM	9	Debinha
CF	11	Cristiane		(substituted off) 65'
Substitutions:
FW	16	Beatriz		(substituted on) 65'
DF	2	Poliana		(substituted on) 76'
MF	18	Luana		(substituted on) 84'
Manager:
Vadão

Player of the Match:
Marta (Brazil)

Assistant referees:
Mayte Chávez (Mexico)
Enedina Caudillo (Mexico)
Fourth official:
Katja Koroleva (United States)
Reserve assistant referee:
Mary Njoroge (Kenya)
Video assistant referee:
Carlos del Cerro Grande (Spain)
Assistant video assistant referees:
Tiago Martins (Portugal)
Loreto Toloza (Chile)

== Discipline ==
Fair play points would have been used as tiebreakers in the group if the overall and head-to-head records of teams were tied, or if teams had the same record in the ranking of third-placed teams. These were calculated based on yellow and red cards received in all group matches as follows:

- first yellow card: minus 1 point;
- indirect red card (second yellow card): minus 3 points;
- direct red card: minus 4 points;
- yellow card and direct red card: minus 5 points;

Only one of the above deductions were applied to a player in a single match.

Team	Match 1				Match 2				Match 3				Points
Team	Yellow card	(yellow card) (yellow-red card)	Red card	(yellow card) (red card)	Yellow card	(yellow card) (yellow-red card)	Red card	(yellow card) (red card)	Yellow card	(yellow card) (yellow-red card)	Red card	(yellow card) (red card)	Points
Australia	1								1				−2
Italy	3								1				−4
Jamaica	1				2				1				−4
Brazil	2				3				2				−7

== See also ==
- Australia at the FIFA Women's World Cup
- Brazil at the FIFA Women's World Cup
- Italy at the FIFA Women's World Cup
- Jamaica at the FIFA Women's World Cup
