= Wendy Natis =

Panamanian footballer (born 2002)

Personal information
- Full name: Wendy Yisbel Natis Bárcenas
- Date of birth: 19 August 2002 (age 24)
- Place of birth: Panama City, Panama
- Height: 1.68 m (5 ft 6 in)
- Position: Defender

Senior career*
Years	Team	Apps	(Gls)
- CD Universitario
2021	CD Plaza Amador		
2022–2023	América de Cali	15	(2)
2024	EC Bahia		
2025	Atlético San Luis	26	(0)

International career^{‡}
2020–	Panama U20		
2021–	Panama	7	
- * Club domestic league appearances and goals as of 9 March 2023 ‡ National team caps and goals as of 9 March 2023

Wendy Yisbel Natis Bárcenas (born 19 August 2002) is a Panamanian professional footballer who plays as a defender for Liga MX club Atlético San Luis and the Panama women's national team.

== Early life ==
Natis was born in Panama City, Panama, on August 19, 2002. Natis grew up as a multi-sport athlete, playing volleyball, basketball, and wrestling. She began playing football when she was 16, but only within her neighborhood and not for any academy or club.

== Club career ==
Natis was first scouted to play for a club by the current Panama women's national team assistant manager, Raiza Gutiérrez, for the women's section of CD Universitario. She then signed for CD Plaza Amador in February 2021.

In January 2022, Natis signed for América de Cali of the Colombian Women's Football League, making her a professional football player. In the second leg of the 2022 Colombian Women's Football league semifinal, Natis scored against Deportivo Pereira in a 2–0 win to help send her team to the finals. Natis earned her first title with América de Cali in June 2022 after she played both matches of the 2022 Colombian Women's Football League finals. In the first match, she started and played all 90 minutes of a 2–1 loss. In the second leg at the Estadio Olímpico Pascual Guerrero, they came back to win 3–1 in front of a Colombian women's football record-breaking attendance of 37,100 spectators. She became the first Panamanian to win the Colombian Women's League. Shortly after, she renewed her contract with América de Cali until the end of 2022 to compete in the 2022 Copa Libertadores Femenina.

América de Cali advanced to the semifinals of the tournament, after conceding just two goals in the group stage and the quarterfinals. They faced eventual champions- Brazil's Palmeiras- in the semifinals, which ended in a 0–1 loss for Natis's team. In the third place match, they faced national rivals Deportivo Cali and won 5–0.

On January 4, 2023, she renewed with América de Cali for the 2023 season.

In December 2024, she signed with Atlético San Luis.

== International career ==
In a match for the U-20 national team, Natis was started as a defender by order of coach Raiza Gutiérrez. Natis ended up converting permanently to a defender. Natis was called up as a defender at the 2022 CONCACAF U-20 Women's Championship, where Panama advanced to the quarterfinals against Canada. Natis started but was shown a straight red card in the 45th minute for stopping a goal with her hand in the opposition's penalty area. Panama lost 0-1 and were eliminated by Canada.

Natis made her senior international debut on February 15, 2021, appearing in a 1–3 loss against Guatemala in an international friendly.

Natis represented Panama at the 2022 CONCACAF W Championship, where Panama were placed in Group B with Canada, Costa Rica, and Trinidad and Tobago. She played the full match of Panama's 0–3 loss against Costa Rica, and in Panama's following match against Canada, she started but was taken off in the 55th minute due to an injury. Panama conceded in the 64th minute and recorded a 0–1 loss. Natis was available for Panama's final group stage match against Trinidad and Tobago, which ended in a 1–0 win and gave Panama 3 points and a third-place finish on the Group B table. It managed to be enough to send them to inter-confederation playoffs, the final round of qualification for the 2023 FIFA Women's World Cup.

On February 19, 2023, Natis started and played all 90 minutes of the Group C semifinal in the inter-confederation play-off tournament against Papua New Guinea, which resulted in a clean sheet and a 2-0 Panama win. On February 23, 2023, Natis started at left-back and played all 90 minutes of the Group C final against Paraguay, which ended in a 1–0 victory for Panama and sent them to their first ever FIFA Women's World Cup.

== International goals ==
No.	Date	Venue	Opponent	Score	Result	Competition
1.	8 April 2025	Centro Nacional de Alto Rendimiento, Los Robles La Paz, Venezuela	Venezuela	1–0	1–1	Friendly

== Honors ==
CD Universitario

- LFF Apertura: 2018, 2019
- LFF Clausura: 2019

América de Cali

- Colombian Women's Football League: 2022
- Copa Libertadores Femenina: Third place, 2022
