= Yenith Bailey =

Panamanian footballer (born 2001)

Personal information
- Full name: Yenith Elizabett Bailey de la Cruz
- Date of birth: 29 March 2001 (age 25)
- Place of birth: Panama City, Panama
- Height: 1.70 m (5 ft 7 in)
- Position: Goalkeeper

Team information
- Current team: Santa Fe FC
- Number: 30

Senior career*
| Years | Team | Apps | (Gls) |
| 2016–2019 | San Francisco | | |
| 2019–2021 | Tauro | | |
| 2019 | → Libertad/Limpeño (loan) | | |
| 2021 | Atlético Nacional | 9 | |
| 2021–2023 | Dimas Escazú | | |
| 2023–2024 | Tauro | | |
| 2024– | Santa Fe | | |

International career^{‡}
| 2017– | Panama | 32 | (0) |
- * Club domestic league appearances and goals ‡ National team caps and goals as of 9 July 2019

Yenith Elizabett Bailey de la Cruz (born 29 March 2001) is a Panamanian footballer who plays as a goalkeeper for Santa Fe FC and the Panama women's national team. She is nicknamed Chomba.

== Club career ==
Bailey began playing in the top division in Panama as a 15-year-old and has spent much of her career in the country, including earning multiple titles with Tauro FC and Santa Fe. On the back of Santa Fe's 2024 title, Bailey featured heavily in the subsequent title-winning campaign in the 2024 UNCAF Women's Interclub Championship and tougher 2024–25 CONCACAF W Champions Cup group stage.

== International career ==
Bailey appeared in three matches for Panama at the 2018 CONCACAF Women's Championship, making 24 saves. She won the tournament's Golden Glove award and was named to its Best XI. Previously a midfielder, she was converted to goalkeeper by head coach Victor Suárez only a year before the tournament.

Panama ended up fourth, advancing to a playoff against CONMEBOL side Argentina for a place in the 2019 Women's World Cup. In the 8th minute of the first leg Bailey saved a penalty from Estefanía Banini. The match finished 4-0 for Argentina, though, and after a 1-1 draw at home Panama was eliminated.

Bailey would then backstop Panama though the following World Cup campaign, with the team once again needing to go through the play-offs after the CONCACAF Championship. This time, Panama won both of their play-off matches, successfully qualifying for the World Cup for the first time. At the 2023 FIFA Women's World Cup, Bailey played all three group stage matches but failed to advance from a group that included both Brazil and France.

== Honors ==
=== Tauro FC ===
- Liga de Fútbol Femenino (Panamá): Ap.2023

=== Santa Fe FC ===
- Liga de Fútbol Femenino (Panamá): Ap.2024
- UNCAF Interclub Championship: 2024

=== Individual ===
- CONCACAF W Championship Golden Glove: 2018

== See also ==
- List of Panama women's international footballers
