= Toña Is =

Spanish footballer (born 1966)

Personal information
- Full name: María Antonia Is Piñera
- Date of birth: June 13, 1966 (age 60)
- Place of birth: Oviedo, Asturias, Spain
- Height: 1.69 m (5 ft 7 in)
- Position: Defender

Team information
- Current team: Panama (Manager)

Senior career*
Years	Team	Apps	(Gls)
1982–2000	Oviedo Moderno CF		

International career
1989–1999	Spain	34	(0)

Managerial career
- 2015–2018: Spain U-17
- 2021: Pachuca (women)
- 2024–: Panama
- * Club domestic league appearances and goals

María Antonia "Toña" Is Piñera (born 1966) is a Spanish former football defender who played through her career for CFF Tradehi. She earned 33 caps for the Spain women's national football team from 1989 through the 1990s, taking part in the 1997 European Championship.
As manager of the Spain women's national under-17 football team, she led the squad to the nation's first-ever World Cup championship on the women's side, winning against Mexico women's national under-17 football team 2–1. In December 2020, she was named head coach of Pachuca Femenil.
