= Emily Cedeño =

Panamanian footballer (born 2003)

Personal information
- Full name: Emily Masiel Cedeño Coba
- Date of birth: 22 November 2003 (age 22)
- Place of birth: Puerto Armuelles, Panama
- Height: 1.62 m (5 ft 4 in)
- Position: Midfielder

Team information
- Current team: Tauro

Senior career*
Years	Team	Apps	(Gls)
- Tauro

International career^{‡}
2022–	Panama	3	
- * Club domestic league appearances and goals ‡ National team caps and goals as of 12 February 2023

Emily Masiel Cedeño Coba (born 22 November 2003) is a Panamanian footballer who plays as a midfielder for Tauro FC and the Panama women's national team.

== International goals ==
No.	Date	Venue	Opponent	Score	Result	Competition
1.	26 June 2023	Victoria Stadium, Gibraltar	Gibraltar	1–0	7–0	Friendly
2.	26 June 2023	Victoria Stadium, Gibraltar	Gibraltar	2–0	7–0	Friendly
3.	26 June 2023	Victoria Stadium, Gibraltar	Gibraltar	7–0	7–0	Friendly
