= Deysiré Salazar =

Panamanian footballer (born 2004)

Personal information
- Full name: Deysiré Mayte Salazar Biscaino
- Date of birth: 4 May 2004 (age 22)
- Place of birth: Río Alejandro, Panama
- Height: 1.62 m (5 ft 4 in)
- Position: Midfielder

Team information
- Current team: Tauro

Senior career*
Years	Team	Apps	(Gls)
- Tauro

International career
2019–	Panama		
- * Club domestic league appearances and goals

Deysiré Mayte Salazar Biscaino (born 4 May 2004) is a Panamanian footballer who plays as a midfielder for Tauro FC and the Panama women's national team. She is nicknamed Chiqui (Small).

== International career ==
In June 2024, she took part in the Sud Ladies Cup in France with Panama

== International goals ==
No.	Date	Venue	Opponent	Score	Result	Competition
1.	26 June 2023	Victoria Stadium, Gibraltar	Gibraltar	3–0	7–0	Friendly
