= Farissa Córdoba =

Panamanian footballer (born 1989)

Personal information
- Full name: Farissa Evelin Córdoba Martínez
- Date of birth: 30 June 1989 (age 37)
- Place of birth: Panama City, Panama
- Height: 1.83 m (6 ft 0 in)
- Position: Goalkeeper

Senior career*
Years	Team	Apps	(Gls)
2019	Ñañas	23	(0)
2019–2020	Maccabi Holon	12	(0)

International career^{‡}
2018	Panama	2	(0)
- * Club domestic league appearances and goals as of 5 December 2019 ‡ National team caps and goals as of 9 July 2019

Farissa Evelin Córdoba Martínez (born 30 June 1989) is a Panamanian footballer who plays as a goalkeeper for Israeli Ligat Nashim club Maccabi Holon FC and the Panama women's national team.

== International career ==
Córdoba appeared in two matches for Panama at the 2018 CONCACAF Women's Championship.

== See also ==
- List of Panama women's international footballers
