= Carmen Montenegro =

Panamanian footballer (born 2000)

Personal information
- Full name: Carmen Milagros Montenegro Martínez
- Date of birth: 5 December 2000 (age 25)
- Place of birth: Chame District, Panama
- Height: 1.65 m (5 ft 5 in)
- Position: Midfielder

Team information
- Current team: Sporting SM

Senior career*
Years	Team	Apps	(Gls)
- El Brujas
- Panamá Oeste
- Independiente La Chorrera
- CD Universitario
- Sporting SM

International career^{‡}
2022–	Panama	1	
- * Club domestic league appearances and goals ‡ National team caps and goals as of 5 February 2023

Carmen Milagros Montenegro Martínez (born 5 December 2000) is a Panamanian footballer who plays as a midfielder for Sporting San Miguelito and the Panama women's national team.

== International goals ==
No.	Date	Venue	Opponent	Score	Result	Competition
1.	20 September 2023	Estadio Pensativo, Antigua, Guatemala	Guatemala	3–0	3–0	2024 CONCACAF W Gold Cup qualification
2.	28 October 2025	Estadio Félix Castillo Tardío, Chincha Alta, Peru	Peru	3–0	3–0	Friendly
