= Río Alejandro =

- Location within Panama
- Coordinates: 9°22′25″N 79°47′19″W
- Country: Panama
- Province: Colón

Population (2008)
  - Total: 4 048

Río Alejandro is a town in the Colón province of Panama.

== Sources ==
- World Gazetteer: Panama – World-Gazetteer.com
