= Ignacio Quintana =

Mexican football manager (born 1988)

Personal information
- Full name: Ignacio Quintana Toledo
- Date of birth: 20 April 1988 (age 38)
- Place of birth: Mexico City, Mexico

Team information
- Current team: Atlético San Luis (women) (manager)

Managerial career
- Years: Team
- 2019–2020: Nicaragua (women) (assistant)
- 2021–2024: Panama (women)
- 2025–: Atlético San Luis (women)

Ignacio Quintana Toledo (born 20 April 1988) is a Mexican football manager who manages the Panama women's national team.

== Early life ==
Quintana was born in Mexico City, Mexico.

== Playing career ==
Quintana played football at an amateur level.

== Managerial career ==
In 2021, Quintana was appointed manager of the Panama women's national team. He helped Panama have equal salaries and conditions between the men's and women's national teams. He helped Panama qualify for the 2023 FIFA Women's World Cup, their first Women's World Cup. He holds a A coaching license.

He has worked for CONCACAF as a coaching license instructor. He has also worked as assistant for the Nicaragua women's national team. Before that, he worked as a youth manager at Reforma and Lioness FC.

== Personal life ==
Quintana is nicknamed "Nacho". He is a supporter of Mexican side Necaxa and has two older sisters and an older brother.
