= Aldrith Quintero =

Panamanian footballer (born 2002)

Personal information
- Full name: Aldrith Ivana Quintero Humphries
- Date of birth: 1 January 2002 (age 24)
- Place of birth: Panama City, Panama
- Height: 1.80 m (5 ft 11 in)
- Position: Midfielder

Team information
- Current team: Fleury
- Number: 6

Senior career*
Years	Team	Apps	(Gls)
201?–2020	Tauro		
2020–2022	Real Unión Tenerife	42	(4)
2023	Alhama	16	(1)
2023–	Fleury	9	(0)

International career^{‡}
2018–	Panama	10	(0)
- * Club domestic league appearances and goals as of 18 April 2023 ‡ National team caps and goals as of 8 November 2020

Aldrith Ivana Quintero Humphries (born 1 January 2002) is a Panamanian professional footballer who plays as a midfielder for Première Ligue club Fleury and the Panama women's national team.

== International career ==
Quintero appeared in five matches for Panama at the 2018 CONCACAF Women's Championship.

== International goals ==
No.	Date	Venue	Opponent	Score	Result	Competition
1.	8 October 2022	Estadio Rodrigo Paz Delgado, Quito, Ecuador	Ecuador	1–0	1–0	Friendly

== See also ==
- List of Panama women's international footballers
