= Rebeca Espinosa =

Panamanian footballer (born 1992)

Personal information
- Full name: Rebeca Margoth Espinosa Justavino
- Date of birth: 5 July 1992 (age 34)
- Place of birth: David, Panama
- Height: 1.72 m (5 ft 8 in)
- Position: Defender

Team information
- Current team: Sporting SM

Senior career*
Years	Team	Apps	(Gls)
–2019	Universitario		
2019	Sol de América		
- Plaza Amador
- Sporting SM

International career^{‡}
2018–	Panama	4	(0)
- * Club domestic league appearances and goals ‡ National team caps and goals as of 9 July 2019

Rebeca Margoth Espinosa Justavino (born 5 July 1992) is a Panamanian footballer who plays as a defender for Sporting San Miguelito and the Panama women's national team. She is nicknamed Rebe.

== International career ==
Espinosa appeared in one match for Panama at the 2018 CONCACAF Women's Championship.

== See also ==
- List of Panama women's international footballers
