= Karla Riley =

Panamanian footballer (born 1997)

Personal information
- Full name: Karla Paola Riley Serracín
- Date of birth: 18 September 1997 (age 29)
- Place of birth: Panama City, Panama
- Height: 1.65 m (5 ft 5 in)
- Position: Forward

Senior career*
| Years | Team | Apps | (Gls) |
| 2013–2018 | Sporting San Miguelito | | |
| 2019 | CD Universitario | | |
| 2019–2021 | Pozoalbense | 37 | (12) |
| 2021 | Santa Teresa | 10 | (0) |
| 2022 | Tauro | | |
| 2022 | Cruz Azul | 8 | (0) |
| 2023 | Sporting FC | | |
| 2023 | Tauro | | |
| 2024 | Cacereño | | |
| 2024 | Atlético Nacional | | |
| 2025 | UMECIT FC | | |
| 2025 | Santa Fe FC | | |
| 2026 | Universidad de Chile | 23 | (4) |

International career^{‡}
| 2011–2012 | Panama U17 | 9 | (6) |
| 2012 | Panama U20 | 5 | (0) |
| 2017– | Panama | 24 | (9) |
- * Club domestic league appearances and goals as of 19 November 2026 ‡ National team caps and goals as of 3 August 2023

Karla Paola Riley Serracín (born 18 September 1997) is a Panamanian footballer who plays as a forward. She is nicknamed La emperatriz del gol (The empress of the goal).

== Career ==
In July 2019, Riley signed with Pozoalbense.

In February 2026, Riley moved to Chile and joined Universidad de Chile.

== International goals ==
Scores and results list Panama's goal tally first

| No. | Date | Venue | Opponent | Score | Result | Competition |
|---|---|---|---|---|---|---|
| 1 | 27 August 2018 | IMG Academy Field 6, Bradenton, United States | Nicaragua | 1–0 | 4–0 | 2018 CONCACAF Women's Championship qualification |
| 2 | 27 August 2018 | IMG Academy Field 6, Bradenton, United States | Nicaragua | 3–0 | 4–0 | 2018 CONCACAF Women's Championship qualification |
| 3 | 29 August 2018 | IMG Academy Field 11, Bradenton, United States | El Salvador | 2–1 | 6–2 | 2018 CONCACAF Women's Championship qualification |
| 4 | 10 October 2018 | Sahlen's Stadium, Cary, United States | Mexico | 1–0 | 2–0 | 2018 CONCACAF Women's Championship |
| 5 | 6 August 2019 | Estadio Universidad San Marcos, Lima, Peru | Mexico | 1–4 | 1–5 | 2019 Pan American Games |
| 8 | 9 April 2023 | Estadio Rommel Fernández, Panama City, Panama | Dominican Republic | 4–3 | 4–3 | Friendly |
| 7 | 21 June 2023 | Estadio Olímpico Pascual Guerrero, Cali, Colombia | Colombia | 1–1 | 1–1 | Friendly |
| 8 | 26 June 2023 | Victoria Stadium, Gibraltar | Gibraltar | 3–0 | 7–0 | Friendly |
| 9 | 2 June 2025 | Estadio Rommel Fernández, Panama City, Panama | Bolivia | 3–0 | 5–1 | Friendly |
| 10 | 30 November 2025 | Stadion Rignaal 'Jean' Francisca, Willemstad, Curacao | Curaçao | 1–0 | 6–1 | 2026 CONCACAF W Championship qualification |
| 11 | 9 April 2026 | Estadio Universitario, Penonomé, Panama | Aruba | 3–1 | 3–1 | 2026 CONCACAF W Championship qualification |

== See also ==
- List of Panama women's international footballers
