= Lineth Cedeño =

Panamanian footballer (born 2000)

Personal information
- Full name: Lineth Isabel Cedeño Valderrama
- Date of birth: 5 December 2000 (age 25)
- Place of birth: Panama City, Panama
- Height: 1.70 m (5 ft 7 in)
- Position: Forward

Team information
- Current team: Turbine Potsdam
- Number: 19

Senior career*
Years	Team	Apps	(Gls)
–2019	Tauro		
2019–2020	Joventut Almassora	3+	(2+)
2020–2021	Alhama CF	9	(2)
2021–2022	Hellas Verona	15	(5)
2022–2023	Sampdoria	13	(0)
2023–2024	Al Hilal	1	(0)
2025	Chorrillo FC		
2025–	Turbine Potsdam		

International career^{‡}
2017–	Panama	25	(10)
- * Club domestic league appearances and goals as of 12 February 2023 ‡ National team caps and goals as of 8 August 2024

Lineth Isabel Cedeño Valderrama (born 5 December 2000) is a Panamanian professional footballer who plays as a forward for the Panama women's national team. She is nicknamed Palito (Little Stick).

== Career ==
Cedeño began playing club football with Tauro FF. In 2019, she joined Spanish third-tier side Joventot Alamassora. The following season she played in the second-tier with Alhama CF.

She joined Italian club SSD Women Hellas Verona in 2021, and made her Serie A debut in August 2021.

== International goals ==
Scores and results list Panama's goal tally first

No.	Date	Venue	Opponent	Score	Result	Competition
1	27 August 2018	IMG Academy Field 6, Bradenton, United States	Nicaragua	4–0	4–0	2018 CONCACAF Women's Championship qualification
2	29 August 2018	IMG Academy Field 11, Bradenton, United States	El Salvador	5–2	6–2	2018 CONCACAF Women's Championship qualification
3	10 October 2018	Sahlen's Stadium, Cary, United States	Mexico	2–0	2–0	2018 CONCACAF Women's Championship
4	17 October 2018	Toyota Stadium, Frisco, United States	Jamaica	2–2	2–2	2018 CONCACAF Women's Championship
5	10 November 2022	Estadio Municipal de Chapín, Jerez de la Frontera, Spain	Venezuela	1–0	3–1	Friendly
6	10 November 2022	Estadio Municipal de Chapín, Jerez de la Frontera, Spain	Venezuela	3–0	3–1	Friendly
7	23 February 2023	Waikato Stadium, Hamilton, New Zealand	Paraguay	1–0	1–0	2023 FIFA Women's World Cup qualification
8	9 April 2023	Estadio Rommel Fernández, Panama City, Panama	Dominican Republic	2–1	4–3	Friendly
9	2 August 2023	Sydney Football Stadium, Sydney, Australia	France	3–5	3–6	2023 FIFA Women's World Cup
10	25 October 2023	Estadio Rommel Fernández. Panama City, Panama	Jamaica	2–1	2–1	2024 CONCACAF W Gold Cup qualification
11	8 July 2025	HBF Park, Perth, Australia	Australia	2–2	2–3	Friendly
12	28 October 2025	Estadio Félix Castillo Tardío, Chincha Alta, Peru	Peru	1–0	3–0	Friendly

== See also ==
- List of Panama women's international footballers
