= Schiandra González =

Panamanian footballer (born 1995)

Personal information
- Full name: Schiandra Yael González Jurado
- Date of birth: 4 July 1995 (age 31)
- Place of birth: David, Panama
- Height: 1.68 m (5 ft 6 in)
- Position: Midfielder

Senior career*
Years	Team	Apps	(Gls)
- Estrellas Chiricanas
- SUVA Sports
2022	Plaza Amador		
2023–2024	Tauro		
2024–2025	Santa Fé FC		
2025–2026	Turbine Potsdam		

International career^{‡}
2012	Panama U17	3	(0)
2018–	Panama	17	(0)
- * Club domestic league appearances and goals ‡ National team caps and goals as of 11 April 2021.

Schiandra Yael González Jurado (born 4 July 1995) is a Panamanian footballer who plays as a midfielder for the Panama women's national team. She is nicknamed Sandrita.

== Early life ==
González was born in David.

== Club career ==
González has played for Estrellas Chiricanas in Panama and for SUVA Sports in Costa Rica.

== International career ==
González represented Panama at the 2012 CONCACAF Women's U-17 Championship. She made her senior debut on 24 March 2018 in a 1–1 friendly away draw against Trinidad and Tobago.

== International goals ==
Scores and results list Panama's goal tally first.

No.	Date	Venue	Opponent	Score	Result	Competition
1.	27 October 2024	Estadio Alejandro Morera Soto, Alajuela, Costa Rica	Costa Rica	1–0	1–0	Friendly
