= Riley Cohn =

Panamanian footballer (born 1999)

Personal information
- Full name: Riley Madison Cohn
- Birth name: Riley Madison Tanner Rintala
- Date of birth: 15 October 1999 (age 27)
- Place of birth: Grand Rapids, Michigan, United States
- Height: 1.70 m (5 ft 7 in)
- Position: Forward

Team information
- Current team: Sydney FC
- Number: 13

Youth career
- 2015–2017: Michigan Hawks
- 2017–2018: Midwest United

College career
Years	Team	Apps	(Gls)
2018–2021	South Carolina Gamecocks	45	(7)
2021–2022	Alabama Crimson Tide	45	(8)

Senior career*
Years	Team	Apps	(Gls)
2020–2022	Midwest United	5	(1)
2023–2024	Washington Spirit	0	(0)
2024–2025	Spokane Zephyr	1	(0)
2025–	Sydney FC	17	(5)

International career^{‡}
2023–	Panama	22	(9)
- * Club domestic league appearances and goals as of 3 April 2026 ‡ National team caps and goals as of 9 April 2026

Riley Madison Cohn (née Tanner; born 15 October 1999) is a professional footballer who plays as a forward for Australian A-League Women club Sydney FC. Born in the United States, she represents Panama at international level.

== College career ==
Cohn played college soccer at the University of South Carolina and the University of Alabama, where she earned a Master of Public Health in 2022.

== Club career ==
After graduating college, Cohn was chosen in the third round of the 2023 NWSL Draft by the Washington Spirit. On April 8, 2024, she was waived by the Spirit.

Cohn was signed by Spokane Zephyr in June 2024, ahead of the inaugural USL Super League season.

In August 2025, Cohn joined Australian A-League Women club Sydney FC. In July 2026, she departed the club to take up an opportunity overseas. Due to a change of circumstances, and following her marriage, Cohn returned to Sydney FC for the 2026–27 A-League Women season.

== International career ==
Although Cohn was born in Grand Rapids, Michigan, she was eligible to play for Panama as her mother was born in Panama City.

On January 26, 2023, Cohn was announced as part of a 23-player Panama squad for the Women's World Cup inter-confederation play-offs. In the first play-off match against Papua New Guinea on February 19, Cohn scored after coming off the bench to help Panama win 2–0.

== Personal life ==
In June 2026, Cohn married Donnie Cohn and following that changed her family name from "Tanner" to "Cohn".

== Career statistics ==
=== Club ===
As of August 23, 2024

Appearances and goals by club, season and competition
Club	Season	League			Cup (Note: Includes the NWSL Challenge Cup)		Playoffs (Note: Includes NWSL Playoffs)		Total	
Club	Season	Division	Apps	Goals	Apps	Goals	Apps	Goals	Apps	Goals
Washington Spirit	2023	NWSL	0	0	2	0	—		2	0
Washington Spirit	2024	NWSL	0	0	—		—		0	0
Spokane Zephyr FC	2024–25	USL Super League	0	0	0	0	0	0	0	0
Career total			0	0	2	0	0	0	2	0

=== International goals ===
No.	Date	Venue	Opponent	Score	Result	Competition
1.	February 19, 2023	North Harbour Stadium, Auckland, New Zealand	Papua New Guinea	2–0	2–0	2023 FIFA Women's World Cup qualification
2.	September 20, 2023	Estadio Pensativo, Antigua, Guatemala	Guatemala	1–0	3–0	2024 CONCACAF W Gold Cup qualification
3.	September 24, 2023	Estadio Universitario, Penonomé, Panama	Guatemala	2–1	2–3	2024 CONCACAF W Gold Cup qualification
4.	May 29, 2025	Estadio Rommel Fernández, Panama City, Panama	Bolivia	2–0	2–0	Friendly
5.	June 2, 2025	Estadio Rommel Fernández, Panama City, Panama	Bolivia	2–0	5–1	Friendly
6.	June 2, 2025	Estadio Rommel Fernández, Panama City, Panama	Bolivia	5–1	5–1	Friendly
7.	November 30, 2025	Stadion Rignaal 'Jean' Francisca, Willemstad, Curacao	Curaçao	6–1	6–1	2026 CONCACAF W Championship qualification
8.	3 March 2026	SKNFA Technical Center, St. Peter's, Saint Kitts and Nevis	Saint Kitts and Nevis	2–0	3–0	2026 CONCACAF W Championship qualification
9.	9 April 2026	Estadio Universitario, Penonomé, Panama	Aruba	1–1	3–1	2026 CONCACAF W Championship qualification
