= 2023 FIFA Women's World Cup qualification (inter-confederation play-offs) =

Play-Off Tournament for the FIFA Women's World Cup 2023

Tournament details
- Host country: New Zealand
- Dates: 18–23 February 2023
- Teams: 10 (from 6 confederations)
- Venue: 2 (in 2 host cities)

Tournament statistics
- Matches played: 7
- Goals scored: 19 (2.71 per match)
- Attendance: 6,261 (894 per match)
- Top scorer(s): (Cameroon) Gabrielle Onguéné (Haiti) Roselord Borgella (Haiti) Melchie Dumornay (2 goals each)

The inter-confederation play-offs (Note: Officially known as the Play-Off Tournament for the FIFA Women's World Cup 2023.) of the 2023 FIFA Women's World Cup qualification determined the final three qualification spots for the 2023 FIFA Women's World Cup. The play-off tournament was used as a test event for New Zealand to host prior to the Women's World Cup. It took place from 18 to 23 February 2023, and featured ten teams split into three groups, with the winner of each group qualifying for the Women's World Cup. New Zealand and guests Argentina also played friendlies against participating teams and each other as part of the event.

== Format ==
On 24 December 2020, the Bureau of the FIFA Council approved the slot allocation and format of the play-off tournament.

- AFC (Asia): 2 slots
- CAF (Africa): 2 slots
- CONCACAF (North, Central America and the Caribbean): 2 slots
- CONMEBOL (South America): 2 slots
- OFC (Oceania): 1 slot
- UEFA (Europe): 1 slot

The play-off tournament was held in New Zealand as a test event prior to their hosting of 2023 FIFA Women's World Cup. It featured ten teams, split into three groups of three (Group A and B) or four (Group C). The winner of each group qualified for the FIFA Women's World Cup. Four teams were seeded into groups based on the FIFA Women's World Rankings. In Groups A and B, two unseeded teams faced each other in a semi-final. The winner of the semi-final advanced to the play-off final, playing against the seeded team for a spot in the Women's World Cup. In Group C, the two seeded teams faced an unseeded team in the semi-finals. The winners of the semi-finals faced each other in the play-off final for a spot in the Women's World Cup.

New Zealand and Argentina (confirmed as guests on 8 December 2022) participated in friendly matches as part of the event, first against one of the seeded teams in Groups A and B, and then twice against each other. Friendly matches also took place between the semi-final loser of Groups A and B, as well as the two semi-final losers of Group C, thereby ensuring that all play-off teams played two matches at the event.

New Zealand were confirmed as the sole host nation for the play-off tournament on 4 July 2022. Australia were originally planned as co-hosts of the play-offs, with their national team intended to participate in friendly matches.

== Qualified teams ==
The following teams from each confederation qualified for the play-off tournament.

Confederation	Qualified as	Team
AFC	2022 Women's Asian Cup play-offs runners-up	Chinese Taipei
AFC	2022 Women's Asian Cup play-offs third place	Thailand
CAF	2022 Women's Africa Cup of Nations repechage winners	Cameroon
CAF	2022 Women's Africa Cup of Nations repechage winners	Senegal
CONCACAF	2022 W Championship Group A third place	Haiti
CONCACAF	2022 W Championship Group B third place	Panama
CONMEBOL	2022 Copa América Femenina fourth place	Paraguay
CONMEBOL	2022 Copa América Femenina fifth place	Chile
OFC	2022 Women's Nations Cup winners	Papua New Guinea
UEFA	Lowest-ranked winners of UEFA play-offs	Portugal

== Venues ==
The two venues for the tournament were confirmed by FIFA on 4 July 2022.

2023 FIFA Women's World Cup qualification (inter-confederation play-offs) is located in New Zealand	Hamilton	Auckland
2023 FIFA Women's World Cup qualification (inter-confederation play-offs) is located in New Zealand	Waikato Stadium	North Harbour Stadium
2023 FIFA Women's World Cup qualification (inter-confederation play-offs) is located in New Zealand	Capacity: 25,800	Capacity: 22,000

== Draw ==
The play-off draw took place on 14 October 2022, 12:00 CEST (UTC+2), in Zürich, Switzerland. Four teams were seeded into groups based on the FIFA Women's World Rankings of 13 October 2022 (shown in parentheses), with a maximum of one seeded team per confederation. The UEFA team was automatically seeded into pot 1, so as to prevent three or four European teams from being drawn into the same group in the final tournament. (Note: In the final tournament draw, geographical constraints dictated that teams from the same confederation could not be drawn into the same group except for UEFA teams, for which there was at least one and no more than two per group. However, as the final tournament draw was held before the completion of the play-offs, the play-off winners would be represented by placeholders which adhered to the geographical constraints of only the seeded team(s) of each play-off group. Therefore, teams from the same confederation might ultimately end up in the same final tournament group. However, FIFA wished to avoid the unlikely possibility of a final tournament group containing three or four UEFA teams, if the UEFA team in the play-offs were to be unseeded. Therefore, the UEFA team was automatically seeded into pot 1 of the play-off draw, regardless of their ranking.) The highest-ranked team was placed in slot A1, the second-highest in slot B1, the third-highest in slot C1, and the fourth-highest in slot C2. The remaining six teams were unseeded and drawn into the remaining slots, with the condition that teams from the same confederation could not be drawn into the same group. In the draw, the six unseeded teams were allocated to the first available group sequentially (from A to C, before repeating). After a team was selected, a separate draw then determined the team's position within their respective group for the purposes of the schedule.

Pot 1 (seeded)	Pot 2 (unseeded)
1. Portugal (23) (A1); 2. Chile (38) (B1); 3. Chinese Taipei (40) (C1); 4. Papua New Guinea (50) (C2)	5. Thailand (41); 6. Paraguay (51); 7. Haiti (56); 8. Panama (57); 9. Cameroon (58); 10. Senegal (84)

== Squads ==
Each team had to provide to FIFA a preliminary squad of between 35 and 55 players, which was not to be published. From the preliminary squad, each team had to name a final squad of up to 23 players (three of whom must be goalkeepers). Players in the final squad could be replaced due to serious injury or illness up to 24 hours prior to the team's first match.

== Schedule ==
The match schedule and venues, without kick-off times, were confirmed on 4 July 2022. The kick-off times were confirmed on 5 November 2022, after the play-off draw. The semi-finals took place from 18 to 19 February, while the finals took place from 22 to 23 February 2023.

All times listed are local, NZDT (UTC+13).

== Group A ==
The winner of Group A entered Group E in the final tournament.

=== Bracket ===
Semi-final
18 February 2023 – Hamilton
Cameroon	2
Thailand	0

Final
22 February 2023 – Hamilton
Portugal	2
Cameroon	1

=== Semi-final ===
18 February 2023
19:00

Cameroon	2–0	Thailand
Onguéné 79', 81'	Report

Waikato Stadium, Hamilton
Attendance: 1,021
Referee: Melissa Borjas (Honduras)

=== Final ===
22 February 2023
19:30

Portugal	2–1	Cameroon
Gomes 22'; C. Costa 90+4' (pen.)	Report	Nchout 89'

Waikato Stadium, Hamilton
Attendance: 1,132
Referee: Casey Reibelt (Australia)

== Group B ==
The winner of Group B entered Group D in the final tournament.

=== Bracket ===
Semi-final
18 February 2023 – Auckland
Senegal	0
Haiti	4

Final
22 February 2023 – Auckland
Chile	1
Haiti	2

=== Semi-final ===
18 February 2023
14:00

Senegal	0–4	Haiti
	Report	K. Louis 45'; Mondésir 55'; Borgella 64', 66'

North Harbour Stadium, Auckland
Attendance: 925
Referee: Kateryna Monzul (Ukraine)

=== Final ===
22 February 2023
14:00

Chile	1–2	Haiti
Rojas 90+11'	Report	Dumornay 45+1', 90+8'

North Harbour Stadium, Auckland
Attendance: 1,157
Referee: Salima Mukansanga (Rwanda)

== Group C ==
The winner of Group C entered Group F in the final tournament.

=== Bracket ===
Semi-finals
19 February 2023 – Hamilton
Chinese Taipei	2 (2)
Paraguay (p)	2 (4)
19 February 2023 – Auckland
Papua New Guinea	0
Panama	2

Final
23 February 2023 – Hamilton
Paraguay	0
Panama	1

=== Semi-finals ===
19 February 2023
14:00

Chinese Taipei	2–2 (a.e.t.)	Paraguay
Lai Li-chin 21'; Su Hsin-yun 75'	Report	Quintana 80'; Chamorro 81'
Penalties
Lai Li-chin (penalty scored); Zhuo Li-ping (penalty missed); Lee Hsiu-chin (penalty scored); Pao Hsin-hsuan (penalty missed)	2–4	(penalty scored) Quintana; (penalty scored) Gauto; (penalty scored) M. Martínez; (penalty scored) Chamorro

Waikato Stadium, Hamilton
Attendance: 804
Referee: Salima Mukansanga (Rwanda)

19 February 2023
19:00

Papua New Guinea	0–2	Panama
	Report	Cox 12'; Tanner 63'

North Harbour Stadium, Auckland
Attendance: 746
Referee: Casey Reibelt (Australia)

=== Final ===
23 February 2023
14:00

Paraguay	0–1	Panama
	Report	L. Cedeño 75'

Waikato Stadium, Hamilton
Attendance: 476
Referee: Kateryna Monzul (Ukraine)

== Goalscorers ==
There were 19 goals scored in 7 matches, for an average of 2.71 goals per match.

2 goals

- (Cameroon) Gabrielle Onguéné
- (Haiti) Roselord Borgella
- (Haiti) Melchie Dumornay

1 goal

- (Cameroon) Ajara Nchout
- (Chile) María José Rojas
- (Chinese Taipei) Lai Li-chin
- (Chinese Taipei) Su Hsin-yun
- (Haiti) Kethna Louis
- (Haiti) Nérilia Mondésir
- (Panama) Lineth Cedeño
- (Panama) Marta Cox
- (Panama) Riley Tanner
- (Paraguay) Lice Chamorro
- (Paraguay) Dulce Quintana
- (Portugal) Carole Costa
- (Portugal) Diana Gomes

== Qualified teams for FIFA Women's World Cup ==
The following three teams qualified for the 2023 FIFA Women's World Cup.

Team	Qualified on	Previous appearances in FIFA Women's World Cup
Haiti	22 February 2023	0 (debut)
Portugal	22 February 2023	0 (debut)
Panama	23 February 2023	0 (debut)

== Associated friendly matches ==
Friendly matches were scheduled during the play-off tournament in New Zealand. They had no bearing on qualification, but were considered by FIFA to be part of the event.

17 February 2023
19:00

New Zealand	0–5	Portugal
	Report	J. Silva 17'; Do. Silva 42' (pen.); Capeta 63', 69'; T. Pinto 79'

Waikato Stadium, Hamilton
Attendance: 3,788
Referee: Emikar Calderas (Venezuela)

17 February 2023
19:30

Argentina	4–0	Chile
Stábile 40'; Larroquette 49' (pen.); Rodríguez 71'; Bonsegundo 90+3'	Report

North Harbour Stadium, Auckland
Referee: Anna-Marie Keighley (New Zealand)

20 February 2023
19:00

New Zealand	0–2	Argentina
	Report	Larroquette 17'; Cometti 90'

Waikato Stadium, Hamilton
Attendance: 3,622
Referee: Lara Lee (Australia)

21 February 2023
19:00

Thailand	1–1	Senegal
Janista 17'	Report	Diakhaté 67' (pen.)

Waikato Stadium, Hamilton
Referee: Emikar Calderas (Venezuela)

23 February 2023
13:00

Chinese Taipei	5–0	Papua New Guinea
Chen Yen-ping 29'; Pao Hsin-hsuan 34'; Su Yu-hsuan 37'; Ting Chia-ying 65'; Lee Hsiu-chin 76'	Report

North Harbour Stadium, Auckland
Referee: Anna-Marie Keighley (New Zealand)

23 February 2023
19:00

New Zealand	0–1	Argentina
	Report	Larroquette 77'

North Harbour Stadium, Auckland
Attendance: 3,914
Referee: Tatiana Guzmán (Nicaragua)

== Discipline ==
A player was automatically suspended for the next match for receiving a red card, which could be extended for serious offences.

The following suspensions were served during the tournament:

Player	Offence(s)	Suspension(s)
(Cameroon) Fatima Komé	(red card) in Women's Africa Cup of Nations repechage vs Botswana (17 July 2022)	Group A semi-final vs Thailand (18 February 2023)
(Cameroon) Ange Bawou	(red card) in Group A semi-final vs Thailand (18 February 2023)	Group A final vs Portugal (22 February 2023)

== Player of the Match award ==
A player of the match was named for each game at the tournament, including friendlies.

Match	Player of the Match	Opponent	Ref.
Women's World Cup qualification
1	(Cameroon) Gabrielle Onguéné	Thailand	
2	(Haiti) Roselord Borgella	Senegal	
3	(Paraguay) Alicia Bobadilla	Chinese Taipei	
4	(Panama) Marta Cox	Papua New Guinea	
5	(Portugal) Tatiana Pinto	Cameroon	
6	(Haiti) Melchie Dumornay	Chile	
7	(Panama) Lineth Cedeño	Paraguay	
Friendly matches
1	(Portugal) Ana Capeta	New Zealand	
2	(Argentina) Florencia Bonsegundo	Chile	
3	(Argentina) Mariana Larroquette	New Zealand (first match)	
4	(Thailand) Phornphirun Philawan	Senegal	
5	(Chinese Taipei) Lee Hsiu-chin	Papua New Guinea	
6	(Argentina) Mariana Larroquette	New Zealand (second match)	
