= Yomira Pinzón =

Panamanian footballer (born 1996)

Personal information
- Full name: Yomira Tibisay Pinzón Ríos
- Date of birth: 23 August 1996 (age 30)
- Place of birth: Panama City, Panama
- Height: 1.70 m (5 ft 7 in)
- Positions: Defender; midfielder

Team information
- Current team: Saprissa

Senior career*
Years	Team	Apps	(Gls)
–2018	Atlético Nacional		
2019	Tauro		
2019–2020	Pozoalbense	10	(0)
- Saprissa

International career^{‡}
2012	Panama U17	2	(0)
2017–	Panama	9	(1)
- * Club domestic league appearances and goals as of 28 September 2019 ‡ National team caps and goals as of 13 November 2018

Yomira Tibisay Pinzón Ríos (born 23 August 1996) is a Panamanian footballer who plays as a defender for Costa Rican club Deportivo Saprissa and the Panama women's national team. She is nicknamed Yomi.

== International goals ==
Scores and results list Panama's goal tally first

No.	Date	Venue	Opponent	Score	Result	Competition
1	27 August 2018	IMG Academy Field 6, Bradenton, United States	Nicaragua	2–0	4–0	2018 CONCACAF Women's Championship qualification
2	2 August 2023	Sydney Football Stadium, Sydney, Australia	France	2–5	3–6	2023 FIFA Women's World Cup

== See also ==
- List of Panama women's international footballers
