= Chantelle Swaby =

American-Jamaican footballer (born 1998)

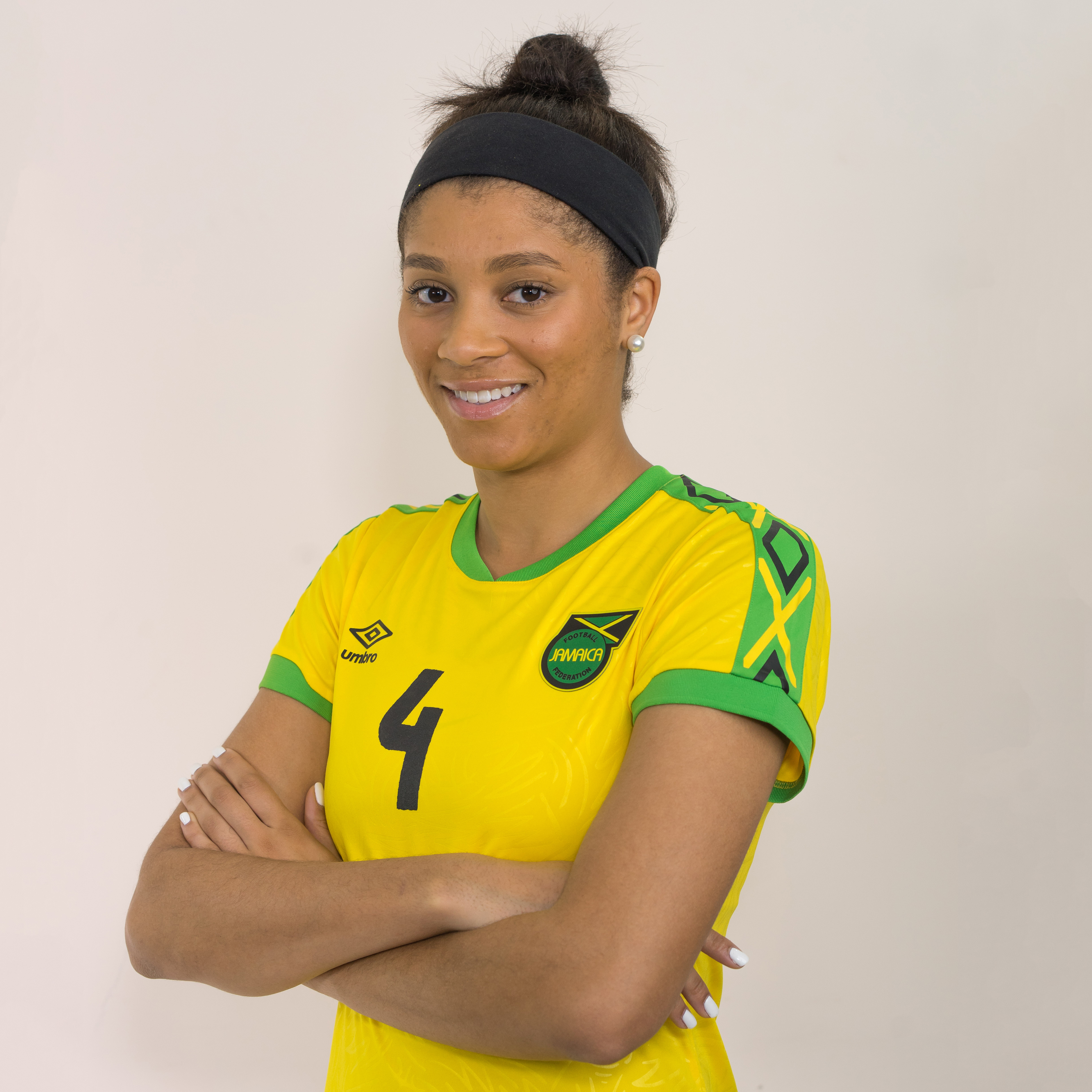

Personal information
- Full name: Chantelle Monique Swaby
- Date of birth: 6 August 1998 (age 28)
- Place of birth: West Hartford, Connecticut, U.S.
- Height: 1.81 m (5 ft 11 in)
- Position: Midfielder

Team information
- Current team: Vancouver Rise
- Number: 21

Youth career
- Connecticut FC
- Hall High School

College career
Years	Team	Apps	(Gls)
2016–2019	Rutgers Scarlet Knights	69	(1)

Senior career*
Years	Team	Apps	(Gls)
2020	Sky Blue FC	0	(0)
2021–2022	Rangers		
2022–2024	Fleury	37	(1)
2024–2026	Leicester City	31	(0)
2026–	Vancouver Rise	0	(0)

International career^{‡}
- United States U19
2018–	Jamaica	49	(0)
Medal record
Representing Jamaica
CONCACAF W Championship
Third place	2018 United States
Third place	2022 Mexico
- * Club domestic league appearances and goals as of 26 June 2025 ‡ National team caps and goals as of 2 March 2026

Chantelle Monique Swaby (born 6 August 1998) is a professional footballer who plays as a midfielder for Northern Super League club Vancouver Rise. Born in the United States, she represents Jamaica internationally.

== Amateur and college career ==
Swaby attended and played soccer for William Hall High School, Connecticut and Rutgers University, New Jersey. She also played youth soccer for Elite Clubs National League club Connecticut FC.

== Club career ==
Swaby previously played for Sky Blue FC of the National Women's Soccer League. In 2021, she signed for Scottish side Rangers. After winning the league with Rangers, Swaby departed and signed a contract through 2024 with FC Fleury 91 of D1 Arkema in France.

Swaby signed for English Women's Super League club Leicester City on a free transfer in July 2024. She departed Leicester City in June 2026.

On 13 August 2026, she joined Northern Super League club Vancouver Rise.

== International career ==
Born in the United States, Swaby represents the Jamaica women's national team at international level.

== Personal life ==
Her older sister Allyson Swaby is also a Jamaican international footballer.

== Honours ==
Rangers

- Scottish Women's Premier League: 2021–22
