= Carina Baltrip-Reyes =

Panamanian footballer (born 1998)

Personal information
- Full name: Carina Alicia Reyes Baltrip
- Birth name: Carina Alicia Baltrip-Reyes
- Date of birth: 1 July 1998 (age 28)
- Place of birth: Austin, Texas, U.S.
- Height: 1.70 m (5 ft 7 in)
- Positions: Defender; midfielder

Team information
- Current team: Les Marseillaises
- Number: 6

Youth career
- 2008–2016: Austin Texans Soccer Club
- 2012–2015: Hendrickson Hawks

College career
Years	Team	Apps	(Gls)
2016–2017	FIU Panthers	9	(0)
2018–2021	Florida Gators	54	(0)

Senior career*
Years	Team	Apps	(Gls)
2021–2022	Spartak Subotica	2	(0)
2022–2023	Marítimo	14	(1)
2023–2026	Lazio	58	(1)
2026–	Les Marseillaises	0	(0)

International career^{‡}
2021–	Panama	30	(1)
- * Club domestic league appearances and goals ‡ National team caps and goals as of 26 June 2026.

Carina Alicia Reyes Baltrip (born 1 July 1998), known as Carina Baltrip-Reyes, is a footballer who plays as a defender or midfielder for Première Ligue side Les Marseillaises. Born in the United States, she plays for the Panama women's national team.

== Early life ==
Baltrip-Reyes was born in Austin, Texas and raised in Pflugerville, Texas to a Panamanian father and an African-American mother.

== High school and college career ==
Baltrip-Reyes has attended the Hendrickson High School in Pflugerville, Texas, the Florida International University in Miami, Florida and the University of Florida in Gainesville, Florida.

== Club career ==
Baltrip-Reyes has played for Spartak Subotica in Serbia, CS Marítimo in Portugal and Lazio in Italy, before joining French side Les Marseillaises on June 26, 2026.

== International career ==
Baltrip-Reyes made her senior debut for Panama on 21 October 2021 in friendly away draw against Trinidad and Tobago.

=== International goals ===
Scores and results list Panama goal tally first

No.	Date	Venue	Opponent	Score	Result	Competition	Ref.
1	25 October 2021	Ato Boldon Stadium, Couva, Trinidad and Tobago	Trinidad and Tobago	1–1	1–1	Friendly	

== See also ==
- List of Panama women's international footballers
