= Hilary Jaén =

Panamanian footballer (born 2002)

Personal information
- Full name: Hilary Stacy Jaén Rodríguez
- Date of birth: 29 August 2002 (age 24)
- Place of birth: Las Margaritas, Panama
- Height: 1.65 m (5 ft 5 in)
- Position: Defender

Team information
- Current team: Jones County Bobcats
- Number: 7

College career
Years	Team	Apps	(Gls)
2022	South Alabama Jaguars	6	(1)
2023–	Jones County Bobcats	19	(16)

Senior career*
Years	Team	Apps	(Gls)
20??–2021	Tauro		
2023	Tauro		

International career^{‡}
2017–	Panama	9	(0)
- * Club domestic league appearances and goals ‡ National team caps and goals as of 9 July 2019

Hilary Stacy Jaén Rodríguez (born 29 August 2002) is a Panamanian footballer who plays as a defender for American collegiate team Jones County Bobcats and the Panama women's national team. She is nicknamed Hilareta.

== International career ==
Jaén appeared in four matches for Panama at the 2018 CONCACAF Women's Championship.

== International goals ==
No.	Date	Venue	Opponent	Score	Result	Competition
1.	16 February 2024	Estadio Universidad Latina, Penonomé, Panama	Paraguay	2–0	2–0	Friendly
2.	30 November 2025	Stadion Rignaal 'Jean' Francisca, Willemstad, Curacao	Curaçao	5–1	6–1	2026 CONCACAF W Championship qualification

== See also ==
- List of Panama women's international footballers
