= Katherine Castillo =

Panamanian footballer (born 1996)

Personal information
- Full name: Katherine Lineth Castillo Macías
- Date of birth: 23 March 1996 (age 30)
- Place of birth: Panama City, Panama
- Height: 1.70 m (5 ft 7 in)
- Position: Right back

Team information
- Current team: Tauro
- Number: 7

Senior career*
Years	Team	Apps	(Gls)
2021	UAI Urquiza		
2022–	Tauro		

International career^{‡}
2018–	Panama	8	(0)
- * Club domestic league appearances and goals ‡ National team caps and goals as of 9 July 2019

Katherine Lineth Castillo Macías (born 23 March 1996) is a Panamanian footballer who plays as a right back for Tauro FC and the Panama women's national team. She is nicknamed Kathyson.

== International career ==
Castillo appeared in four matches for Panama at the 2018 CONCACAF Women's Championship.

== International goals ==
No.	Date	Venue	Opponent	Score	Result	Competition
1.	28 January 2020	BBVA Stadium, Houston, United States	Costa Rica	1–2	1–6	2020 CONCACAF Women's Olympic Qualifying Championship
2.	22 September 2021	Estadio Nacional, San José, Costa Rica	Costa Rica	2–3	2–3	Friendly
3.	17 February 2022	Estadio Rommel Fernández, Panama City, Panama	Barbados	5–0	5–0	2022 CONCACAF W Championship qualification
4.	24 September 2023	Estadio Universitario, Penonomé, Panama	Guatemala	1–1	2–3	2024 CONCACAF W Gold Cup qualification
5.	3 March 2026	SKNFA Technical Center, St. Peter's, Saint Kitts and Nevis	Saint Kitts and Nevis	3–0	3–0	2026 CONCACAF W Championship qualification

== See also ==
- List of Panama women's international footballers
