= Estadio Félix Castillo Tardío =

- Interactive map of Estadio Félix Castillo Tardío
- Location: Chincha Alta, Peru
- Coordinates: 13.4061°S 76.1326°W
- Owner: Instituto Peruano del Deporte
- Capacity: 14,000
- Surface: Grass

Construction
- Built: 2007
- Opened: 25 July 2025

Tenant
- Peru women's national football team

The Estadio Félix Castillo Tardío is a multi-use stadium located in Chincha Alta, Peru. It is mostly used for football but also has an athletics track and various smaller courts. Opened in 2025, the stadium has a capacity of 14,000 and is named after the historic player Félix Castillo. It is the home stadium for the Peru women's national football team.

== History ==
Construction of the stadium initially started in 2007, replacing the old arena that was destroyed in the 2007 Peru earthquake, but paused numerous times. Construction continued in 2024. On 25 July 2025, the stadium was officially inaugurated by a youth squad of Alianza Lima and a city team of various players from Chincha Alta.
