= Allyson Swaby =

Jamaican footballer (born 1996)

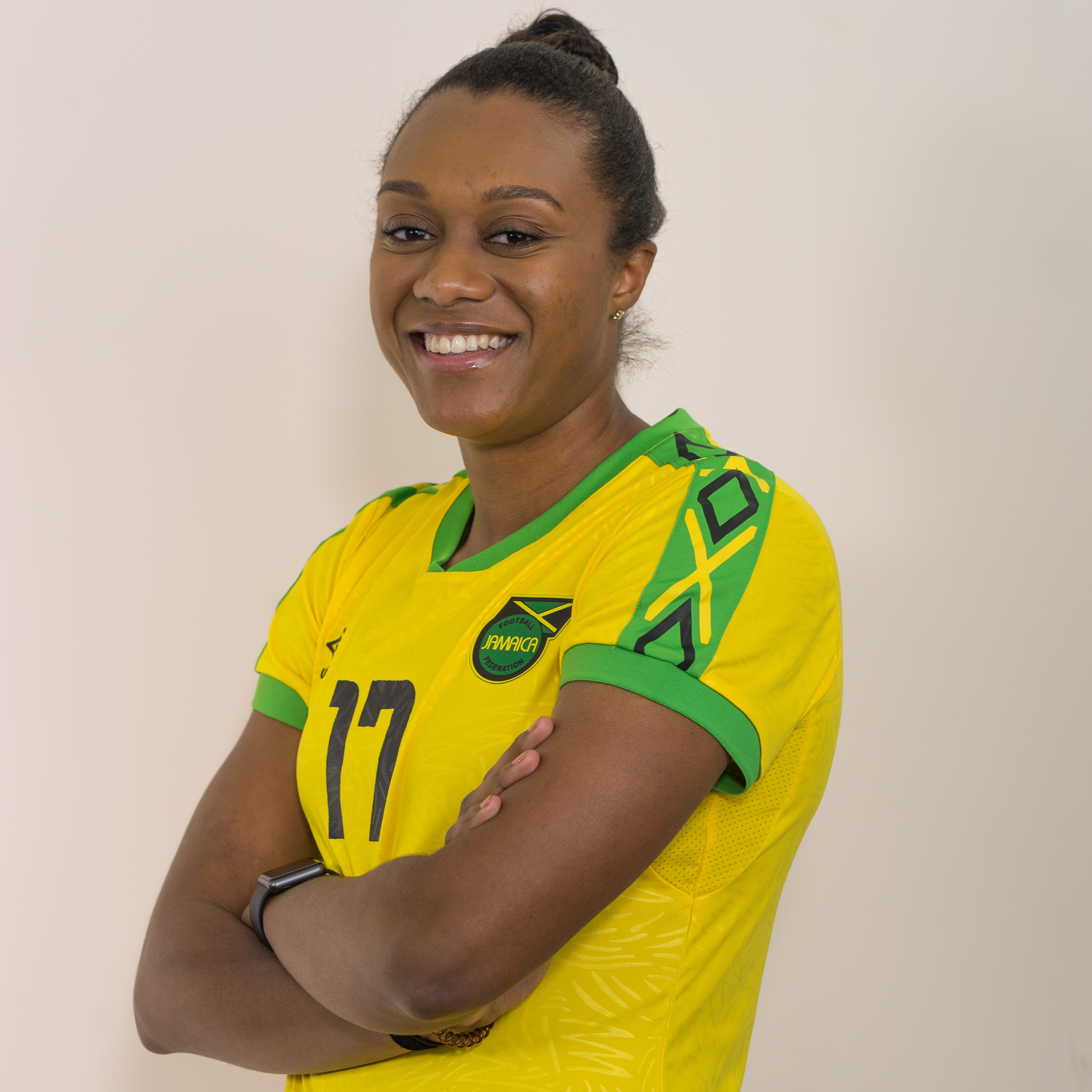

Personal information
- Full name: Allyson Renee Swaby
- Date of birth: 3 October 1996 (age 30)
- Place of birth: Hartford, Connecticut, U.S.
- Height: 1.73 m (5 ft 8 in)
- Position: Centre-back

Team information
- Current team: Crystal Palace
- Number: 29

Youth career
- 2010–2013: Hall High School
- 2011–2014: Connecticut FC

College career
| Years | Team | Apps | (Gls) |
| 2014–2017 | Boston College Eagles | 73 | (2) |

Senior career*
| Years | Team | Apps | (Gls) |
| 2018 | Fjarðab/Höttur/Leiknir | 11 | (5) |
| 2018–2022 | Roma | 55 | (2) |
| 2022–2023 | Angel City | 2 | (0) |
| 2023 | → Paris Saint-Germain (loan) | 0 | (0) |
| 2023–2025 | AC Milan | 28 | (0) |
| 2025– | Crystal Palace | 1 | (0) |

International career^{‡}
| 2015 | United States U20 | | |
| 2018– | Jamaica | 43 | (2) |
Medal record
Representing Jamaica
CONCACAF W Championship
| Third place | 2018 United States |
| Third place | 2022 Mexico |
- * Club domestic league appearances and goals as of 22 February 2025 ‡ National team caps and goals as of 3 March 2026

Allyson Renee Swaby (born 3 October 1996) is a professional footballer who plays as a centre back for Crystal Palace. Born in the United States, she represents Jamaica internationally.

== Amateur/College ==
Swaby attended and played soccer for William Hall High School, Connecticut from 2010 to 2013. She also played youth soccer for Elite Clubs National League club Connecticut FC United from 2011 to 2014.

She played college soccer for the Boston College Eagles in the United States, for four seasons between 2014 and 2017.

== Club career ==
Swaby began her first journey into European football in 2018, moving to Icelandic third-division football team Fjarðab/Höttur/Leiknir.

Swaby would gain a total of 12 appearances and 5 goals in all competitions during her brief stay in Iceland, before the Jamaican international defender caught the interest of Roma coach Betty Bavagnoli. The Italian club signed Swaby as a late, mid-season arrival to boost their squad in Roma's inaugural season of top-flight Italian football.

During the 2018–19 Serie A season, Swaby soon rose through the ranks from a Roma squad player to a regular first-eleven defender who could play either at centre-back or full-back for her club. She capped off her first season with Roma by appearing in the 2019 World Cup for Jamaica.

In her second season with Roma, Swaby's influence on Roma's backline continued to rise along with the consistency in her performances as she became one of the most regular players in the Roma squad. The club relied on Swaby's consistency to form different defensive partnerships with several names such as Federica Di Criscio, Petronella Ekroth and Tecla Pettenuzzo. Roma recognised Swaby's role in the club's growth by making her one of the first Roma players to sign a multi-year contract with the Giallorosse on 4 March 2020. Swaby temporarily stepped away from Roma in early 2020 due to the COVID-19 pandemic.

During her third season with Roma, Swaby was joined by new January 2021 signing Elena Linari at the heart of Roma's defence. The duo went on to reduce Roma's goals-conceded-per-game rate in the second half of the 2020–21 season. On 30 May 2021, Swaby helped Roma keep a clean sheet and win their first major trophy on the women's side of football when Roma defeated AC Milan on penalties in the Coppa Italia final.

On 21 December 2021, National Women's Soccer League expansion side Angel City FC announced that Swaby would join the team following the completion of the Supercoppa Italiana in January 2022. Swaby announced that the move was meant to bring her closer to her family. She signed a two-year contract with an option to extend.

On 26 January 2023, Angel City announced that Swaby would be joining Paris Saint-Germain on a six-month loan. On 30 January, PSG confirmed the loan until June 2023.

Upon Swaby's return from World Cup duty, Angel City transferred her to AC Milan. Her contract runs through June 2026.

On 30 January 2025, Crystal Palace signed Swaby from AC Milan for an undisclosed fee. Her contract runs until June 2027. She made her debut on 11 February, starting in a 2–0 win over Newcastle United in the FA Cup fifth round.

== International career ==
Swaby began her international career with Jamaica in 2018, making 4 appearances in the CONCACAF Women's Championship and playing in the third/fourth place playoff game against Panama. She played in Jamaica's successful World Cup 2019 qualifying campaign, and played in the World Cup tournament itself in the summer of 2019.

In the summer of 2021, Allyson Swaby started as captain of the Jamaica national team for the first time in her international career.

On 4 January 2022, the Jamaica Football Federation announced Swaby as its 2021 female player of the year.

== International goals ==
| No. | Date | Venue | Opponent | Score | Result | Competition |
|---|---|---|---|---|---|---|
| 1. | 10 November 2022 | Montego Bay Sports Complex, Montego Bay, Jamaica | Paraguay | 1–0 | 1–0 | Friendly |
| 2. | 29 July 2023 | Perth Rectangular Stadium, Perth, Australia | Panama | 1–0 | 1–0 | 2023 FIFA Women's World Cup |

== Style of play ==
Swaby shows a preference for direct, vertical football and often makes vertical passes straight to the frontline. She is a skilled defender in aerial duels and can often be tasked with man-marking by her team, owing to her athleticism and strength in individual duels.

== Personal life ==
Her younger sister Chantelle Swaby is also a Jamaican international footballer.
