= Panama women's national football team =

Women's association football team

Panama
- Nickname: Las Canaleras (The Canal Girls)
- Association: Federación Panameña de Fútbol
- Confederation: CONCACAF
- Head coach: Toña Is
- Captain: Marta Cox
- Most caps: Raiza Gutiérrez (39)
- Top scorer: Marta Cox (27)
- Home stadium: Estadio Rommel Fernández
- FIFA code: PAN
First colours	Second colours

FIFA ranking
- Current: 54 ▲2 (20 October 2026)
- Highest: 52 (March – June 2023)
- Lowest: 70 (September 2015)

First international
- Guatemala 1–2 Panama (San Salvador, El Salvador; 28 July 2002)

Biggest win
- Panama 15–2 Belize (Guatemala City, Guatemala; 21 November 2003)

Biggest defeat
- United States 9–0 Panama (Seattle, United States; 2 November 2002)

World Cup
- Appearances: 1 (first in 2023)
- Best result: Group stage (2023)

CONCACAF W Championship
- Appearances: 4 (first in 2002)
- Best result: Fourth place (2018)

The Panama women's national football team (Spanish: selección femenina de fútbol de Panamá) represents Panama in international women's football. The team is overseen by the Federación Panameña de Fútbol. Panama has made four appearances at the CONCACAF W Championship, with their best result being the semi-final finish in 2018. In 2023, Panama made their debut in the FIFA Women's World Cup, finishing last in Group F.

== History ==
=== 2000s ===
In 2002 Panama qualified for the CONCACAF Women's Gold Cup for the first time after securing one of two spots in Central American Zone qualifying. They went 1–0–2 at the 2002 CONCACAF Women's Gold Cup and did not qualify for the knockout round.

Panama once again qualified for the Women's Gold Cup in 2006 after winning their qualifying group. Panama lost their first-round match 2–1 to Jamaica and were eliminated.

=== 2010s ===
Panama did not participate in the 2010 CONCACAF Women's World Cup Qualifying tournament as they did not enter Central American qualifying.

In 2013 Panama participated in the Central American Games for the first time. They went 1–0–1 and advanced to the semi-finals, where they lost to Costa Rica. Panama would finish in fourth place after losing the third place match to Guatemala.

Panama finished second in their group in 2014 Central American Qualifying and did not qualify for the 2014 CONCACAF Women's Championship as only the group winner advanced.

At the 2017 Central American Games, Panama improved on their result from four years ago by defeating El Salvador on penalties to finish in third place.

=== 2018 CONCACAF Women's Championship ===
After failing to qualify for the 2016 Olympic Games, Panama secured one of the two spots available in Central American Qualifying for the 2018 CONCACAF Women's Championship, this marked their first appearance in the CONCACAF Women's Championship since 2006, after defeating Nicaragua and El Salvador. Their qualification was aided by the suspension of perennial rivals, Guatemala, by FIFA. Panama was drawn into Group A, alongside the United States, Mexico and Trinidad and Tobago.

Panama opened the 2018 CONCACAF Women's Championship with a 3–0 victory over Trinidad and Tobago. They suffered a 5–0 loss to the United States in their second match. The score could have been much worse if not for the excellent performance from 17-year old goalkeeper Yenith Bailey, as she made several big saves against the US who had 18 shots on goal. Panama secured their spot in the semi-final by defeating Mexico 2–0 in their final group match. Bailey once again made some big saves, including saving a penalty in the first half. Panama was beaten by Canada 7–0 in the semi-final, but they would move on to the third place match where a win would secure them a spot in the 2019 FIFA Women's World Cup. After drawing 2–2 with Jamaica and losing on penalties in the third-place match, Panama played against Argentina at the CONCACAF-CONMEBOL play-off to secure a spot for France 2019 but was eliminated from the qualification after losing 1–5 to the Argentines on aggregate.

=== 2020 Olympic qualifiers ===
After failing to qualify for the 2019 FIFA Women's World Cup, the Panamanians turned their interest to the 2020 CONCACAF Women's Olympic Qualifying Championship qualification. In Central American qualifying, they were drawn into a group containing Guatemala and Honduras. Held at the Estadio Rommel Fernandez in Panama City, they beat Honduras 3–0 in their first match but due to the Guatemalans beating Honduras 4–0, anything other than a win in their last game would eliminate them. But Panama held their nerve and secured their qualification to 2020 CONCACAF Women's Olympic Qualifying Championship after winning their group with 3–1 win.

At the championship, where the two finalists make the 2020 Olympics, Panama struggled immensely and couldn't recreate their 2018 performance. They first started with a poor 6–1 loss to Costa Rica, followed by a 8–0 loss to United States which eliminated them from Olympic contention. Also their goalkeeper, Yenith Bailey, was subbed off injured. In their final game, which was a dead rubber against Haiti, they had a dismal performance and lost 6–0, although they were very lucky that they didn't concede more. Las Caneleras ended the tournament with 0 wins and a –19 goal difference. After the competition, their manager Raiza Gutiérrez was replaced by Mexican coach, Ignacio Quintana.

=== 2023 Women's World Cup qualifying ===
After comfortable victories against El Salvador, Belize, Aruba and Barbados, Panama qualified for the 2022 CONCACAF W Championship.

They took part in the group stage, against its arch-rival and neighbor Costa Rica, alongside regional powerhouse Canada and Trinidad and Tobago. Panama suffered two defeats to Costa Rica and Canada losing its the chance to finish in top two. By winning 1–0 over Trinidad and Tobago in the third place match, Panama was able to qualify for the inter-confederation play-offs for the 2023 FIFA Women's World Cup. In the inter-confederation play-offs, Panama defeated Papua New Guinea 2–0 and Paraguay 1–0 to qualify for the 2023 Fifa Women's World Cup. Panama was the final team to qualify and will join Group F along with France, Jamaica, and Brazil.

=== 2023 Women's World Cup ===
At the 2023 FIFA Women's World Cup, Panama lost its opening match 4–0 to Brazil. In their second game, against Jamaica, they narrowly lost 1–0, which eliminated them from the tournament. In their final game, against France, they played an entertaining game, where Las Caneleras capped off their tournament with a 6–3 loss. Marta Cox scored her nation's first ever World Cup goal with a free kick from a long way out, which hit the top corner in the second minute. Their other goals were scored by Yomira Pinzón and Lineth Cedeño. After the match, French manager Herve Renard was severely disappointed with his team's performance.

== Team image ==
=== Nicknames ===
The Panama women's national football team have been nicknamed as "Las Canaleras (The Canal Girls)."

=== Home stadium ===
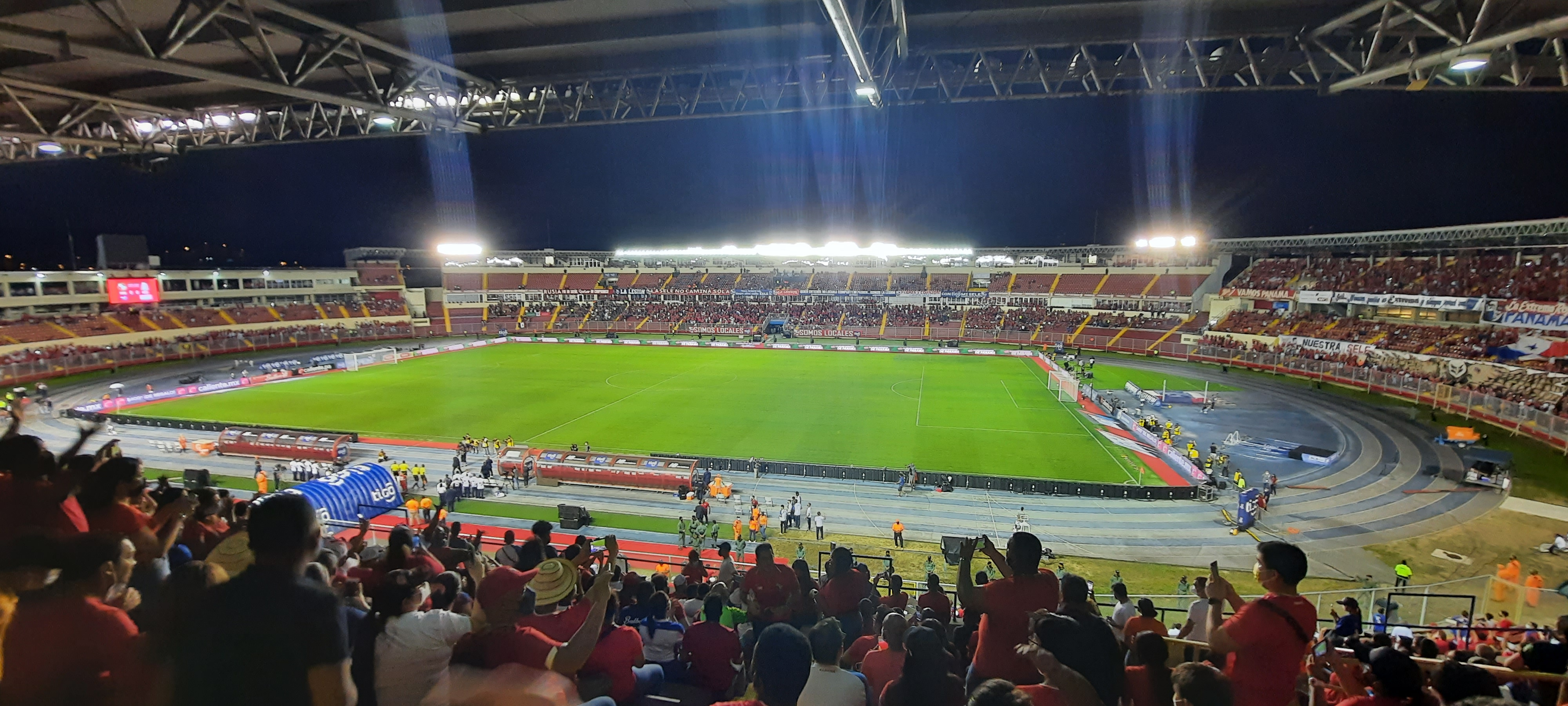
Estadio Rommel Fernández in September 2021

Panama plays their home matches on the Estadio Rommel Fernández.

== Results and fixtures ==
The following is a list of match results in the last 12 months, as well as any future matches that have been scheduled.

Legend

Win Draw Lose Fixture

=== 2025 ===
28 October Friendly	Peru	0–3	Panama	Chincha Alta, Peru
		Report	Cedeño 1'; Parris 33'; Montenegro 89'	Stadium: Estadio Félix Castillo Tardío

30 November 2026 CONCACAF W Championship Q	Curaçao	1–6	Panama	Willemstad, Curaçao
20:00 UTC−4	Martina 71'	Report (FIFA); Report (CONCACAF)	Riley 4'; Parris 50'; E. Araúz 66', 73'; Jaén 79'; Tanner 90+2'	Stadium: Stadion Rignaal 'Jean' Francisca; Referee: Marie-Soleil Beaudoin (Canada)

=== 2026 ===
4 March 2026 CONCACAF W Championship Q	Saint Kitts and Nevis	0–3	Panama	St. Peter's, Saint Kitts and Nevis
19:00 UTC−4		Report (FIFA); Report (CONCACAF)	Espinosa 53'; Tanner 56'; Castillo 90+3'	Stadium: SKNFA Technical Center; Referee: Génesis de León (Guatemala)

9 April 2026 CONCACAF W Championship Q	Panama	3–1	Aruba	Penonomé, Panama
19:00 UTC−5	Tanner 16'; Hernández 29'; Riley 73'	Report (FIFA); Report (CONCACAF)	Susanna 5'	Stadium: Estadio Universitario; Referee: Sandra Benítez (El Salvador)

17 April 2026 CONCACAF W Championship Q	Panama	3–0	Cuba	Penonomé, Panama
19:00 UTC−5	Arauz 2', 57'; Wanton 22' (o.g.)	Report (FIFA); Report (CONCACAF)		Stadium: Estadio Universitario; Referee: Alyssa Pennington (United States)

10 October Friendly	Panama	Cancelled	New Zealand	Panama City, Panama
19:00 UTC−5		Report		Stadium: Estadio Rommel Fernández
Note: Two-match series between New Zealand cancelled due to the 2026 Panama earthquake.

13 October Friendly	Panama	Cancelled	New Zealand	Panama City, Panama
16:30 UTC−5		Report		Stadium: Estadio Rommel Fernández
Note: Two-match series between New Zealand cancelled due to the 2026 Panama earthquake.

28 November 2026 CONCACAF W Championship QF	Canada	v	Panama	Mansfield, United States
12:00 UTC−6				Stadium: Texas Health Mansfield Stadium

=== 2027 ===
12 January Friendly	United States	v	Panama	Carson, California
				Stadium: Dignity Health Sports Park

- Next Games – FEPAFUT.com
- "Panama: Fixtures and Results". Soccerway.

== Coaching staff ==
=== Current coaching staff ===
As of 10 October 2024

Technical Corps

Position	Name	Ref
Head coach	(Spain) Toña Is	

Medical staff

Position	Name	Ref.
Doctor	Luis Sevillano	
Physiotherapist	Lisbeth Vallecilla	

Administrative

Position	Name	Ref.
Delegate	Pedro Núñez	
Press Delegate	Adán De Gracia-Esmenjaud	

=== Manager history ===
- (Peru) Lizandro Barbarán (2006)
- (Mexico) Ignacio Quintana (2020–2024)
- (Spain) Toña Is (2024–)

== Players ==
=== Current squad ===
The following players were named to the squad for the 2026 CONCACAF W Championship qualification match against Curaçao in November 2025.

Caps and goals updated as of 2025-05-30 after the match against Bolivia.

No.	Pos.	Player	Date of birth (age)	Caps	Goals	Club
12	GK	Yenith Bailey	29 March 2001 (age 25)	13	0	(Panamanian Football Federation) Santa Fe FC
1	GK	Farissa Córdoba	30 June 1989 (age 37)	4	0	(Panamanian Football Federation) UMECIT FC
0	GK	Isabella Morey	30 June 1999 (age 27)	0	0	(United States Soccer Federation) Georgia Southwestern
22	DF	Arlén Hernández	28 November 1993 (age 32)		0	(Panamanian Football Federation) Santa Fe FC
16	DF	Rebeca Espinosa	5 July 1992 (age 34)	9	0	(Panamanian Football Federation) UMECIT FC
5	DF	Katherine González	9 April 1997 (age 29)			(Panamanian Football Federation) UMECIT FC
4	DF	Katherine Castillo	23 March 1996 (age 30)	16	1	(Argentine Football Association) San Lorenzo
2	DF	Hilary Jaén	29 August 2002 (age 24)			(United States Soccer Federation) UMass Lowell
3	DF	Wendy Natis	19 August 2001 (age 25)	8	0	(Mexican Football Federation) Atlético San Luis
6	DF	Carina Baltrip Reyes	9 April 1997 (age 29)			(Italian Football Federation) Lazio
6	MF	Deysiré Salazar	4 May 2004 (age 22)	18	1	(Panamanian Football Federation) Chorrillo FC
19	MF	Ericka Araúz	20 July 2003 (age 23)	0	0	(Panamanian Football Federation) Rayadas de Chiriquí
14	MF	Carmen Montenegro	5 December 2000 (age 25)		1	(Albanian Football Federation) Vllaznia
15	MF	Aldrith Quintero	1 January 2002 (age 24)	7	1	(Royal Spanish Football Federation) Alhama CF
10	MF	Marta Cox (captain)	20 July 1997 (age 29)	60	23	(Turkish Football Federation) Fenerbahçe
7	MF	Schiandra González	4 July 1995 (age 31)	11	1	(German Football Association) Turbine Potsdam
11	MF	Sherline King	3 March 2006 (age 20)	6	2	(United States Soccer Federation) Jones College
13	MF	Riley Tanner	15 October 1999 (age 27)	19	6	(Football Australia) Sydney FC
21	MF	Ivis Ubarte	1 January 1997 (age 29)			(Panamanian Football Federation) Inter Panamá CF
17	FW	Shayaris Camarena	10 August 2000 (age 26)	1	1	(Panamanian Football Federation) Chorrillo FC
9	FW	Karla Riley	18 September 1997 (age 29)	33	19	(Panamanian Football Federation) Santa Fe FC
18	FW	Lineth Cedeño	5 December 2000 (age 25)	48	16	(German Football Association) Turbine Potsdam
19	FW	Katherin Parris	2 February 2003 (age 23)			(United States Soccer Federation) Maryland WS
21	FW	Ana Quintero	14 August 2004 (age 22)	6	1	(United States Soccer Federation) UTEP Soccer

=== Recent call-ups ===
The following players were called-up in the last 12 months.
This list may be incomplete.

Pos.	Player	Date of birth (age)	Caps	Goals	Club	Latest call-up
DF	Mickeylis Gutiérrez				(Panama) Santa Fe FC	v. Peru,28 October 2025
DF	Izaura Thryane				(Panama) Inter Panamá CF	v. Peru,28 October 2025
DF	Mireilis Rojas				(Albania) Vllaznia	v. Peru,28 October 2025

-

== Records ==
As of 16 March 2021
Players in bold are still active, at least at club level.

=== Most capped players ===
#	Player	Year(s)	Caps
**1**	Raiza Gutiérrez	20??–20??	??

=== Top goalscorers ===
#	Player	Year(s)	Goals	Caps

== Competitive record ==
=== FIFA Women's World Cup ===
FIFA Women's World Cup record
Year	Result	Pld	W	D*	L	GF	GA
(China) 1991	Did not enter						
(Sweden) 1995	Did not enter						
(United States) 1999	Did not enter						
(United States) 2003	Did not qualify						
(China) 2007	Did not qualify						
(Germany) 2011	Did not enter						
(Canada) 2015	Did not qualify						
(France) 2019	Did not qualify						
(Australia) (New Zealand) 2023	Group stage	3	0	0	3	3	11
(Brazil) 2027	To be determined						
(Mexico) (United States) 2031	To be determined						
(United Kingdom) 2035	To be determined						
Total	1/10	3	0	0	3	3	11

*Draws include knockout matches decided on penalty kicks.

=== Olympic Games ===
Summer Olympics record									Qualifying record					
Year	Result	Position	Pld	W	D*	L	GF	GA	Pld	W	D*	L	GF	GA
(United States) 1996	Did not enter								1995 FIFA WWC					
(Australia) 2000	Did not enter								1999 FIFA WWC					
(Greece) 2004	Did not qualify								5	2	1	2	23	13
(China) 2008	Did not enter								Did not enter					
(United Kingdom) 2012	Did not enter								Did not enter					
(Brazil) 2016	Did not enter								Did not enter					
(Japan) 2020	Did not qualify								5	2	0	3	7	21
(France) 2024	Did not qualify								2022 CONCACAF W Championship					
Total	–	–	–	–	–	–	–	–	10	4	1	5	30	34

*Draws include knockout matches decided on penalty kicks.

=== CONCACAF Women's Championship ===
CONCACAF Women's Championship record								Qualification record					
Year	Result	Pld	W	D*	L	GF	GA	Pld	W	D*	L	GF	GA
(Haiti) 1991	Did not enter							Did not enter					
(United States) 1993	Did not enter							Did not enter					
(Canada) 1994	Did not enter							Did not enter					
(Canada) 1998	Did not enter							Did not enter					
(United States) 2000	Did not enter							Did not enter					
(United States) (Canada) 2002	Group stage	3	1	0	2	5	16	4	2	0	2	8	12
(United States) 2006	First round	1	0	0	1	0	2	2	2	0	0	5	0
(Mexico) 2010	Did not enter							Did not enter					
(United States) 2014	Did not qualify							3	2	0	1	17	3
(United States) 2018	**Fourth place**	**5**	**2**	**1**	**2**	**7**	**14**	3	2	0	1	11	5
(Mexico) 2022	Group stage	3	1	0	2	1	4	4	4	0	0	24	0
(N/A) 2026	Qualified							4	4	0	0	15	2
Total	Fourth place	12	4	1	7	13	36	20	16	0	4	80	22

*Draws include knockout matches decided on penalty kicks.

=== CONCACAF W Gold Cup ===
CONCACAF W Gold Cup record								Qualification record							
Year	Result	GP	W	D*	L	GF	GA	Division	Group	GP	W	D*	L	GF	GA
(United States) 2024	Group Stage	3	0	0	3	1	13	A	B	4	2	1	1	8	5
2029	To be determined							To be determined							
Total	–	3	0	0	3	1	13	–	–	4	2	1	1	8	5

*Draws include knockout matches decided on penalty kicks.

=== Pan American Games ===
Pan American Games record
Year	Result	Pld	W	D*	L	GF	GA
(Canada) 1999	Did not enter						
(Dominican Republic) 2003	Did not enter						
(Brazil) 2007	Group stage	4	0	1	3	2	8
(Mexico) 2011	Did not qualify						
(Canada) 2015	Did not qualify						
(Peru) 2019	Fifth place	4	0	1	3	3	10
(Chile) 2023	Did not qualify						
Total	Fifth place	8	0	2	6	5	18

*Draws include knockout matches decided on penalty kicks.

=== Central American and Caribbean Games ===
Central American and Caribbean Games record
Year	Result	Pld	W	D*	L	GF	GA
(Puerto Rico) 2010	Did not enter						
(Mexico) 2014	Did not enter						
(Colombia) 2018	Did not enter						
(El Salvador) 2023	Did not enter						
Total	–	–	–	–	–	–	–

*Draws include knockout matches decided on penalty kicks.

=== Central American Games ===
Central American Games record
Year	Result	Pld	W	D*	L	GF	GA
(Guatemala) 2001	Did not enter						
(Costa Rica) 2013	**Fourth place**	**4**	**1**	**0**	**3**	**8**	**13**
(Nicaragua) 2017	**Bronze medal**	**5**	**1**	**2**	**2**	**8**	**10**
(Guatemala) 2025**	Group stage	2	0	0	2	1	7
Total	Bronze medal	11	2	2	7	17	30

*Draws include knockout matches decided on penalty kicks.
**U23 side was played for the tournament

== Honours ==
=== Regional ===
- **Central American Games**

Bronze Medalists (1): 2017

== See also ==
- Sport in Panama
  - Football in Panama
    - Women's football in Panama
- Panama women's national under-20 football team
- Panama women's national under-17 football team
- Panama men's national football team
