= Football at the 2024 Summer Olympics – Women's qualification =

Twelve teams were scheduled to compete in the women's football tournament at the 2024 Summer Olympics. In addition to France, the host nation, 11 women's national teams qualified from six separate continental confederations.

== Table ==
On 24 February 2022, the FIFA Council approved the slot allocation for the 2024 Summer Olympics. In addition to the automatic qualification of the host nation France, each confederation was given two slots, with the exception of the OFC which was given one slot.

Means of qualification	Dates (Note: Dates and venues are those of final tournaments (or final round of qualification tournaments); various qualification stages may precede these matches.)	Venue(s)	Berth(s)	Qualified
Host nation	—N/a	—N/a	1	France
2022 CONCACAF W Championship	4–18 July 2022	Mexico	1	United States
2022 Copa América Femenina	8–30 July 2022	Colombia	2	Brazil; Colombia
CONCACAF play-off	22–26 September 2023	Jamaica; Canada	1	Canada
2024 OFC Olympic Qualifying Tournament	7–19 February 2024	Samoa	1	New Zealand
2024 UEFA Women's Nations League Finals	23–28 February 2024	Multiple	2	Spain; Germany
2024 AFC Olympic Qualifying Tournament	24–28 February 2024	Multiple	2	Australia; Japan
2024 CAF Olympic Qualifying Tournament	5–9 April 2024	Multiple	2	Nigeria; Zambia
Total			12	

== CONCACAF ==
The 2022 CONCACAF W Championship was used as the first round of Olympic qualification. The winners of the tournament qualified directly to the Olympic tournament, while the teams finishing second and third competed in a play-off for the other qualification place.

=== Qualification round ===
Group A
Group B
Group C

Pos	Team	Pld	Pts
1	Mexico	4	12
2	Puerto Rico	4	9
3	Suriname	4	6
4	Antigua and Barbuda	4	3
5	Anguilla	4	0

Source: CONCACAF

Pos	Team	Pld	Pts
1	Costa Rica	4	12
2	Saint Kitts and Nevis	4	9
3	Guatemala	4	6
4	Curaçao	4	3
5	U.S. Virgin Islands	4	0

Source: CONCACAF

Pos	Team	Pld	Pts
1	Jamaica	4	12
2	Dominican Republic	4	9
3	Bermuda	4	6
4	Cayman Islands	4	3
5	Grenada	4	0

Source: CONCACAF
Group D
Group E
Group F

Pos	Team	Pld	Pts
1	Panama	4	12
2	El Salvador	4	9
3	Belize	4	4
4	Barbados	4	3
5	Aruba	4	1

Source: CONCACAF

Pos	Team	Pld	Pts
1	Haiti	4	12
2	Cuba	4	7
3	Honduras	4	7
4	Saint Vincent and the Grenadines	4	3
5	British Virgin Islands	4	0

Source: CONCACAF

Pos	Team	Pld	Pts
1	Trinidad and Tobago	4	10
2	Guyana	4	8
3	Nicaragua	4	7
4	Dominica	4	3
5	Turks and Caicos Islands	4	0

Source: CONCACAF

=== Final tournament ===
==== Group stage ====
Group A

Pos	Team	Pld	Pts
1	United States	3	9
2	Jamaica	3	6
3	Haiti	3	3
4	Mexico (H)	3	0

Source: CONCACAF
(H) Hosts
Group B

Pos	Team	Pld	Pts
1	Canada	3	9
2	Costa Rica	3	6
3	Panama	3	3
4	Trinidad and Tobago	3	0

Source: CONCACAF

==== Knockout stage ====
Semi-finals
14 July – San Nicolás de los Garza
United States	3
Costa Rica	0
14 July – San Nicolás de los Garza
Canada	3
Jamaica	0

Final
18 July – Guadalupe
United States	1
Canada	0
Third place match
18 July – Guadalupe
Costa Rica	0
Jamaica (a.e.t.)	1

=== Play-off ===
The play-off matches took place on 22 and 26 September 2023.

Team 1	Agg.	Team 2	1st leg	2nd leg
Jamaica	1–4	Canada	0–2	1–2

== CONMEBOL ==
The finalists of the 2022 Copa América Femenina earned Olympic qualification places.

=== Group stage ===
Group A

Pos	Team	Pld	Pts
1	Colombia (H)	4	12
2	Paraguay	4	9
3	Chile	4	6
4	Ecuador	4	3
5	Bolivia	4	0

Source: CONMEBOL
(H) Hosts
Group B

Pos	Team	Pld	Pts
1	Brazil	4	12
2	Argentina	4	9
3	Venezuela	4	6
4	Uruguay	4	3
5	Peru	4	0

Source: CONMEBOL

=== Knockout stage ===
Semi-finals
25 July – Bucaramanga
Colombia	1
Argentina	0
26 July – Bucaramanga
Brazil	2
Paraguay	0

Final
30 July – Bucaramanga
Colombia	0
Brazil	1

Fifth place match
24 July – Armenia
Chile (p)	1 (4)
Venezuela	1 (2)

Third place match
29 July – Armenia
Argentina	3
Paraguay	1

== OFC ==
Eight teams entered qualification and were drawn into two groups of four. The winners and runners-up from each group advanced to the semi-finals, and the winners of those matches played to determine the Oceanian representative to the 2024 Summer Olympics. The tournament took place from 7–19 February 2024 in Samoa.

=== Group round ===
Group A

Pos	Team	Pld	Pts
1	Solomon Islands	3	7
2	Fiji	3	6
3	Papua New Guinea	3	4
4	American Samoa	3	0

Source: OFC
Group B

Pos	Team	Pld	Pts
1	New Zealand	3	9
2	Samoa (H)	3	6
3	Tonga	3	3
4	Vanuatu	3	0

Source: OFC
(H) Hosts

=== Final round ===
Semi-finals
16 February 2024 – Apia
Solomon Islands	2
Samoa	0
16 February 2024 – Apia
New Zealand	7
Fiji	1

Final
19 February 2024 – Apia
Solomon Islands	1
New Zealand	11

== UEFA ==
League A of the 2023–24 UEFA Women's Nations League was used to determine the European nations that would compete at the Summer Olympics, with the top two eligible teams of the Finals (not including host France) qualifying for the Olympics. This was a change in UEFA qualifying tournament from the previous Summer Olympics.

=== Great Britain qualifying controversy ===
As the British Home Nations do not have individual Olympic Associations, all being represented by the British Olympic Association, England (as the highest-ranked Home Nation) was selected to attempt qualification on behalf of Great Britain. Accordingly, Scotland and Wales (both also in League A; Northern Ireland was in League B) could not qualify for the Games, even if they had reached the Nations League A Finals.

England and Scotland were both drawn into Group A1, having to meet twice; at the time of the draw this was considered strange and a conflict of interest. Further controversy arose from this arrangement ahead of the final matchday, with the two playing against each other and qualification undecided.

Due to previous results and the system of tiebreakers, the deciding factor between whether England (and thus Great Britain) or the Netherlands would continue in the tournament, presuming both won their final match, was how many goals they would score. With England having to defeat Scotland by as many goals as possible to qualify a Great Britain team to the Olympics, some outside spectators suggested that Scotland may throw the game as this would benefit them (and they were already set to finish last in the group regardless of result). Other commenters believed that the teams would play a fair game but that the British Home Nations should not have been put in such a position. England won the final match against Scotland 6–0, and, at the end of the match, were in a position to advance to the Nations League A Finals; in added time in the other match, the Netherlands scored twice to go ahead of England on overall goal difference and advanced instead, before coming last in the Finals and not qualifying for the Olympics.

The issue was seen to be caused by the Nations League's system and lack of prestige: England and Scotland had also been in the same group during the 2019 FIFA Women's World Cup, which served as qualifying for the 2020 Summer Olympics (which Great Britain did achieve), with the draw and their performances not questioned due to having to play many other teams and because the World Cup is aspirational and Olympics qualification an afterthought in that situation. The Nations League system had already been questioned as a means of qualifying when its use in ranking the play-offs for the men's Euro 2024 also presented a situation where a team had to lose to have a chance of qualifying (not involving the Home Nations). Suzanne Wrack questioned if UEFA should prevent the Home Nations from being drawn into the same group in similar future situations, especially as it would be theoretically possible for a group of four teams to consist of all four Home Nations. There was also some criticism due to England being the European champions and World Cup runners-up at the time, either of which could have automatically qualified Great Britain by previous qualifying metrics, and the situation would have been avoided.

Andries Jonker, manager of the Netherlands, criticised the situation. Players and staff from both teams considered suggestions of Scotland throwing the match to be rude and disrespectful; the teams have the oldest rivalry in football and it is a matter of national pride in both nations (though especially Scotland) when playing the other.

=== Group round ===
Group A1
Group A2

Pos	Team	Pld	Pts
1	Netherlands	6	12
2	England	6	12
3	Belgium (O)	6	8
4	Scotland (R)	6	2

Source: UEFA
(O) Play-off winners;
(R) Relegated

Pos	Team	Pld	Pts
1	France	6	16
2	Austria	6	10
3	Norway (O)	6	5
4	Portugal (R)	6	3

Source: UEFA
(O) Play-off winners;
(R) Relegated
Group A3
Group A4

Pos	Team	Pld	Pts
1	Germany	6	13
2	Denmark	6	12
3	Iceland (O)	6	9
4	Wales (R)	6	1

Source: UEFA
(O) Play-off winners;
(R) Relegated

Pos	Team	Pld	Pts
1	Spain	6	15
2	Italy	6	10
3	Sweden (O)	6	7
4	Switzerland (R)	6	3

Source: UEFA
(O) Play-off winners;
(R) Relegated

=== Final round ===
Semi-finals
23 February 2024 – Seville
Spain	3
Netherlands	0
23 February 2024 – Décines-Charpieu
France	2
Germany	1

Final
28 February 2024 – Seville
Spain	2
France	0
Third place play-off
28 February 2024 – Heerenveen
Netherlands	0
Germany	2

== AFC ==
Of the 47 national federations in the AFC, 31 entered teams into the competition.

- First round – The top five teams based on the FIFA Women's World Rankings of 9 December 2022 – North Korea, Japan, Australia, China, and South Korea – were given byes to the second round. The remaining 26 teams were drawn into seven groups with the winners of each group advancing to the second round.
- Second round – Twelve teams in the second round were drawn into three groups of four teams, with the winners of each group and the best-ranked runners-up advancing to the third round.
- Third round – Four teams were placed into two home-and-away ties based upon the group with the best runner-up. The winners of each tie advanced to the 2024 Summer Olympics.

The following teams qualified for the second round:

Participation in qualification second round
Pot 1	Pot 2	Pot 3	Pot 4
1. Australia (10); 2. Japan (11); 3. China (13)	4. South Korea (17); 5. Vietnam (33); 6. Chinese Taipei (37)	7. Thailand (44); 8. Philippines (49); 9. Uzbekistan (50)	10. India (61); 11. Iran (67); 12. North Korea (NR) (Note: North Korea had not played a match since March 2019 and were removed from the March 2023 rankings. FIFA Women's World Ranking Procedures, p. 4 "Teams that have not played at least one match during the last 48 months are deemed inactive and therefore not included in the ranking.")

- Numbers in parentheses indicate the position in the FIFA Women's World Ranking published on 24 March 2023.

=== Second round ===
Group A
Group B
Group C

Pos	Team	Pld	Pts
1	Australia (H)	3	9
2	Philippines	3	6
3	Iran	3	1
4	Chinese Taipei	3	1

Source: AFC
(H) Hosts

Pos	Team	Pld	Pts
1	North Korea	3	7
2	South Korea	3	5
3	China (H)	3	4
4	Thailand	3	0

Source: AFC
(H) Hosts

Pos	Team	Pld	Pts
1	Japan	3	9
2	Uzbekistan (H)	3	6
3	Vietnam	3	3
4	India	3	0

Source: AFC
(H) Hosts
Group runners-up

Pos	Team	Pld	Pts
1	Uzbekistan	3	6
2	Philippines	3	6
3	South Korea	3	5

Source: AFC

=== Third round ===
Team 1	Agg.	Team 2	1st leg	2nd leg
Uzbekistan	0–13	Australia	0–3	0–10
North Korea	1–2	Japan	0–0	1–2

== CAF ==
CAF qualification consisted of four rounds of home-and-away matches between July 2023 and April 2024 to determine the two teams which qualified for the 2024 Summer Olympics.

=== First round ===
First round matches were held between 10–18 July 2023.

2024 CAF Women's Olympic qualifying tournament first round
Team 1	Agg.	Team 2	1st leg	2nd leg
Guinea-Bissau	4–5	Benin	2–2	2–3
Guinea	0–7	Ghana	0–3	0–4
Burkina Faso	2–3	Mali	0–1	2–2 (a.e.t.)
Ivory Coast	w/o	Sierra Leone	—	—
Namibia	2–0	Equatorial Guinea	2–0	0–0
Uganda	4–3	Rwanda	3–3	1–0 (a.e.t.)
Ethiopia	10–0	Chad	6–0	4–0
Congo	w/o	Tanzania	—	—
Mozambique	w/o	DR Congo	—	—

=== Second round ===
Second round matches were held between 23–31 October 2023.

2024 CAF Women's Olympic qualifying tournament second round
Team 1	Agg.	Team 2	1st leg	2nd leg
Benin	0–5	Ghana	0–3	0–2
Mali	w/o	Zambia	—	—
Ivory Coast	w/o	Tunisia	—	—
Namibia	0–4	Morocco	0–2	0–2
Uganda	2–3	Cameroon	2–0	0–3 (a.e.t.)
Ethiopia	1–5	Nigeria	1–1	0–4
Tanzania	3–0	Botswana	2–0	1–0
DR Congo	1–3	South Africa	1–1	0–2

=== Third round ===
Third round matches were held between 23–28 February 2024.

2024 CAF Women's Olympic qualifying tournament third round
Team 1	Agg.	Team 2	1st leg	2nd leg
Ghana	3–4	Zambia	0–1	3–3
Tunisia	2–6	Morocco	1–2	1–4
Cameroon	0–1	Nigeria	0–0	0–1
Tanzania	0–4	South Africa	0–3	0–1

=== Fourth round ===
Fourth round matches were held between 5–9 April 2024.

2024 CAF Women's Olympic qualifying tournament fourth round
Team 1	Agg.	Team 2	1st leg	2nd leg
Zambia	3–2	Morocco	1–2	2–0 (a.e.t.)
Nigeria	1–0	South Africa	1–0	0–0
