= 2022 CONCACAF W Championship knockout stage =

CONCACAF women's football championship knockout stage

The 2022 CONCACAF W Championship knockout stage was a single-elimination tournament which made up the latter part of the 2022 CONCACAF W Championship, held from 14 to 18 July 2022 in Mexico. The teams competing in this stage were Canada, Costa Rica, Jamaica, and the United States. All four countries had already qualified for the 2023 FIFA Women's World Cup. The winner qualified for the 2024 Summer Olympics and the 2024 CONCACAF W Gold Cup, while the runner-up and third place will play in a single-leg play-off for both tournaments.

== Qualified teams ==
The winners and runners-up of Group A and Group B qualified for the knockout stage.

Group	Winners	Runners-up
Group A	United States	Jamaica
Group B	Canada	Costa Rica

== Bracket ==
Semi-finals
14 July – San Nicolás de los Garza
United States	3
Costa Rica	0
14 July – San Nicolás de los Garza
Canada	3
Jamaica	0

Final
18 July – Guadalupe
United States	1
Canada	0
Third place match
18 July – Guadalupe
Costa Rica	0
Jamaica (a.e.t.)	1

== Semi-finals ==
=== United States vs Costa Rica ===
14 July 2022
18:00

United States	3–0	Costa Rica
Sonnett 34'; Pugh 45+3'; Sanchez 90+5'	Report (FIFA); Report (CONCACAF)

Estadio Universitario, San Nicolás de los Garza
Attendance: 2,537
Referee: Astrid Gramajo (Guatemala)

United States

Team stats
United States	Statistic	Costa Rica
15	Shots	1
6	Shots on target	0
71%	Possession	29%
446	Passes	124
86%	Pass accuracy	80%
16	Fouls	7
2	Yellow cards	1
0	Red cards	0
2	Offsides	0
7	Corners	2

Costa Rica

Formation: 4–3–3
GK	18	Casey Murphy
LB	14	Emily Sonnett
CB	4	Becky Sauerbrunn
CB	3	Alana Cook	(substituted off) 63'
RB	8	Sofia Huerta
CM	10	Lindsey Horan	(substituted off) 63'
DM	17	Andi Sullivan
CM	16	Rose Lavelle	(yellow card) 70' (substituted off) 81'
LW	9	Mallory Pugh	(substituted off) 63'
CF	13	Alex Morgan
RW	11	Sophia Smith	(substituted off) 81'
Substitutions:
DF	12	Naomi Girma	(substituted in) 63'
MF	22	Kristie Mewis	(substituted in) 81'
MF	2	Ashley Sanchez	(substituted in) 63'
FW	15	Megan Rapinoe	(substituted in) 63' (yellow card) 84'
FW	6	Trinity Rodman	(substituted in) 81'
Manager:
(North Macedonia) Vlatko Andonovski

Formation: 5–4–1
GK	1	Noelia Bermúdez
RB	2	Gabriela Guillén
CB	6	Carol Sánchez
CB	4	Mariana Benavides
CB	5	Valeria del Campo
LB	12	Lixy Rodríguez
RM	13	Emilie Valenciano	(substituted off) 69'
CM	16	Katherine Alvarado	(substituted off) 46'
CM	10	Shirley Cruz	(yellow card) 54' (substituted off) 88'
LM	14	Priscila Chinchilla	(substituted off) 46'
FW	9	Carolina Venegas	(substituted off) 89'
Substitutions:
DF	8	Daniela Cruz	(substituted in) 69'
MF	21	Viviana Chinchilla	(substituted in) 88'
MF	7	Melissa Herrera	(substituted in) 46'
FW	17	Michelle Montero	(substituted in) 89'
FW	15	Cristín Granados	(substituted in) 46'
Manager:
Amelia Valverde

Player of the Match:
(United States) Rose Lavelle

=== Canada vs Jamaica ===
14 July 2022
21:00

Canada	3–0	Jamaica
Fleming 18'; Chapman 64'; Leon 76'	Report (FIFA); Report (CONCACAF)

Estadio Universitario, San Nicolás de los Garza
Attendance: 3,153
Referee: Melissa Borjas (Honduras)

Canada

Team stats
Canada	Statistic	Jamaica
18	Shots	1
9	Shots on target	0
53%	Possession	47%
324	Passes	272
87%	Pass accuracy	92%
6	Fouls	8
0	Yellow cards	1
0	Red cards	0
3	Offsides	1
14	Corners	1

Jamaica

Formation: 4–1–2–1–2
GK	1	Kailen Sheridan
RB	10	Ashley Lawrence	(substituted off) 53'
CB	14	Vanessa Gilles
CB	3	Kadeisha Buchanan
LB	8	Jayde Riviere
DM	11	Desiree Scott	(substituted off) 69'
CM	17	Jessie Fleming	(substituted off) 54'
CM	5	Quinn
AM	12	Christine Sinclair	(substituted off) 53'
CF	16	Janine Beckie
CF	15	Nichelle Prince	(substituted off) 53'
Substitutions:
DF	2	Allysha Chapman	(substituted in) 53'
FW	9	Jordyn Huitema	(substituted in) 53'
FW	19	Adriana Leon	(substituted in) 53'
MF	7	Julia Grosso	(substituted in) 54'
MF	13	Sophie Schmidt	(substituted in) 69'
Manager:
(England) Bev Priestman

Formation: 4–3–3
GK	13	Rebecca Spencer
RB	12	Jayda Hylton-Pelaia		(substituted off) 10'
CB	17	Allyson Swaby
CB	2	Satara Murray
LB	14	Deneisha Blackwood
CM	9	Drew Spence		(substituted off) 79'
CM	6	Havana Solaun
CM	7	Chinyelu Asher		(substituted off) 46'
RF	18	Trudi Carter		(substituted off) 46'
CF	8	Kayla McCoy		(substituted off) 65'
LF	10	Jody Brown
Substitutions:
MF	4	Chantelle Swaby		(substituted in) 10'
FW	15	Kalyssa Van Zanten	(yellow card) 90+4'	(substituted in) 65'
FW	20	Atlanta Primus		(substituted in) 46'
MF	21	Olufolasade Adamolekun		(substituted in) 79'
FW	22	Mireya Grey		(substituted in) 46'
Manager:
Lorne Donaldson

Player of the Match:
(Canada) Adriana Leon

== Third place match ==
18 July 2022
18:00

Costa Rica	0–1 (a.e.t.)	Jamaica
	Report (FIFA); Report (CONCACAF)	Van Zanten 102'

Estadio BBVA, Guadalupe
Attendance: 6,889
Referee: Marie-Soleil Beaudoin (Canada)

Costa Rica

Team stats
Costa Rica	Statistic	Jamaica
12	Shots	11
5	Shots on target	5
42%	Possession	58%
335	Passes	510
86%	Pass accuracy	79%
7	Fouls	14
1	Yellow cards	2
0	Red cards	0
2	Offsides	3
8	Corners	4

Jamaica

Formation: 4–3–1–2
GK	23	Daniela Solera
RB	8	Daniela Cruz
CB	20	Fabiola Villalobos
CB	4	Mariana Benavides
LB	2	Gabriela Guillén
CM	16	Katherine Alvarado
CM	14	Priscila Chinchilla		(substituted off) 76'
CM	15	Cristín Granados		(substituted off) 111'
AM	11	Raquel Rodríguez		(substituted off) 103'
CF	7	Melissa Herrera
CF	19	María Paula Salas		(substituted off) 67'
Substitutions:
FW	9	Carolina Venegas		(substituted in) 67'
MF	12	Lixy Rodríguez	(yellow card) 120+3'	(substituted in) 76'
MF	10	Shirley Cruz		(substituted in) 103'
FW	17	Michelle Montero		(substituted in) 111'
Manager:
Amelia Valverde

Formation: 4–2–3–1
GK	13	Rebecca Spencer
RB	5	Jade Bailey
CB	17	Allyson Swaby		(substituted off) 58'
CB	2	Satara Murray
LB	14	Deneisha Blackwood
CM	9	Drew Spence	(yellow card) 120'
CM	4	Chantelle Swaby
RW	18	Trudi Carter		(substituted off) 99'
AM	20	Atlanta Primus		(substituted off) 77'
LW	10	Jody Brown
CF	11	Khadija Shaw	(yellow card) 37'
Substitutions:
FW	19	Tiernny Wiltshire		(substituted in) 58'
MF	6	Havana Solaun		(substituted in) 77'
FW	15	Kalyssa Van Zanten		(substituted in) 99'
Manager:
Lorne Donaldson

Player of the Match:
(Jamaica) Rebecca Spencer

== Final ==
18 July 2022
21:00

United States	1–0	Canada
Morgan 78' (pen.)	Report (FIFA); Report (CONCACAF)

Estadio BBVA, Guadalupe
Attendance: 17,247
Referee: Katia García (Mexico)

2024 CONCACAF W Champions

United States
Ninth title

United States

Team stats
United States	Statistic	Canada
14	Shots	9
5	Shots on target	5
51%	Possession	49%
352	Passes	311
88%	Pass accuracy	91%
4	Fouls	8
1	Yellow cards	1
0	Red cards	0
1	Offsides	0
7	Corners	1

Canada

Formation: 4–3–3
GK	1	Alyssa Naeher
LB	8	Sofia Huerta
CB	3	Alana Cook
CB	4	Becky Sauerbrunn
RB	19	Emily Fox
CM	16	Rose Lavelle	(substituted off) 90+2'
CM	10	Lindsey Horan	(yellow card) 41'
CM	17	Andi Sullivan
RW	9	Mallory Pugh	(substituted off) 89'
CF	13	Alex Morgan	(substituted off) 89'
LW	11	Sophia Smith	(substituted off) 89'
Substitutions:
DF	12	Naomi Girma	(substituted in) 89'
MF	20	Taylor Kornieck	(substituted in) 90+2'
FW	6	Trinity Rodman	(substituted in) 89'
FW	23	Margaret Purce	(substituted in) 89'
Manager:
(North Macedonia) Vlatko Andonovski

Formation: 4–3–3
GK	1	Kailen Sheridan
LB	8	Jayde Riviere	(substituted off) 61'
CB	3	Kadeisha Buchanan
CB	14	Vanessa Gilles
RB	10	Ashley Lawrence
CM	11	Desiree Scott
CM	5	Quinn	(substituted off) 57'
CM	17	Jessie Fleming
RW	16	Janine Beckie
CF	12	Christine Sinclair	(yellow card) 46' (substituted off) 68'
LW	15	Nichelle Prince	(substituted off) 68'
Substitutions:
DF	2	Allysha Chapman	(substituted in) 61'
MF	7	Julia Grosso	(substituted in) 57'
FW	9	Jordyn Huitema	(substituted in) 68'
FW	19	Adriana Leon	(substituted in) 68'
Manager:
(England) Bev Priestman

Player of the Match:
(United States) Alex Morgan
