= 2022 CONCACAF W Championship final =

Final association football match of the 2022 CONCACAF W Championship

2022 CONCACAF W Championship Final
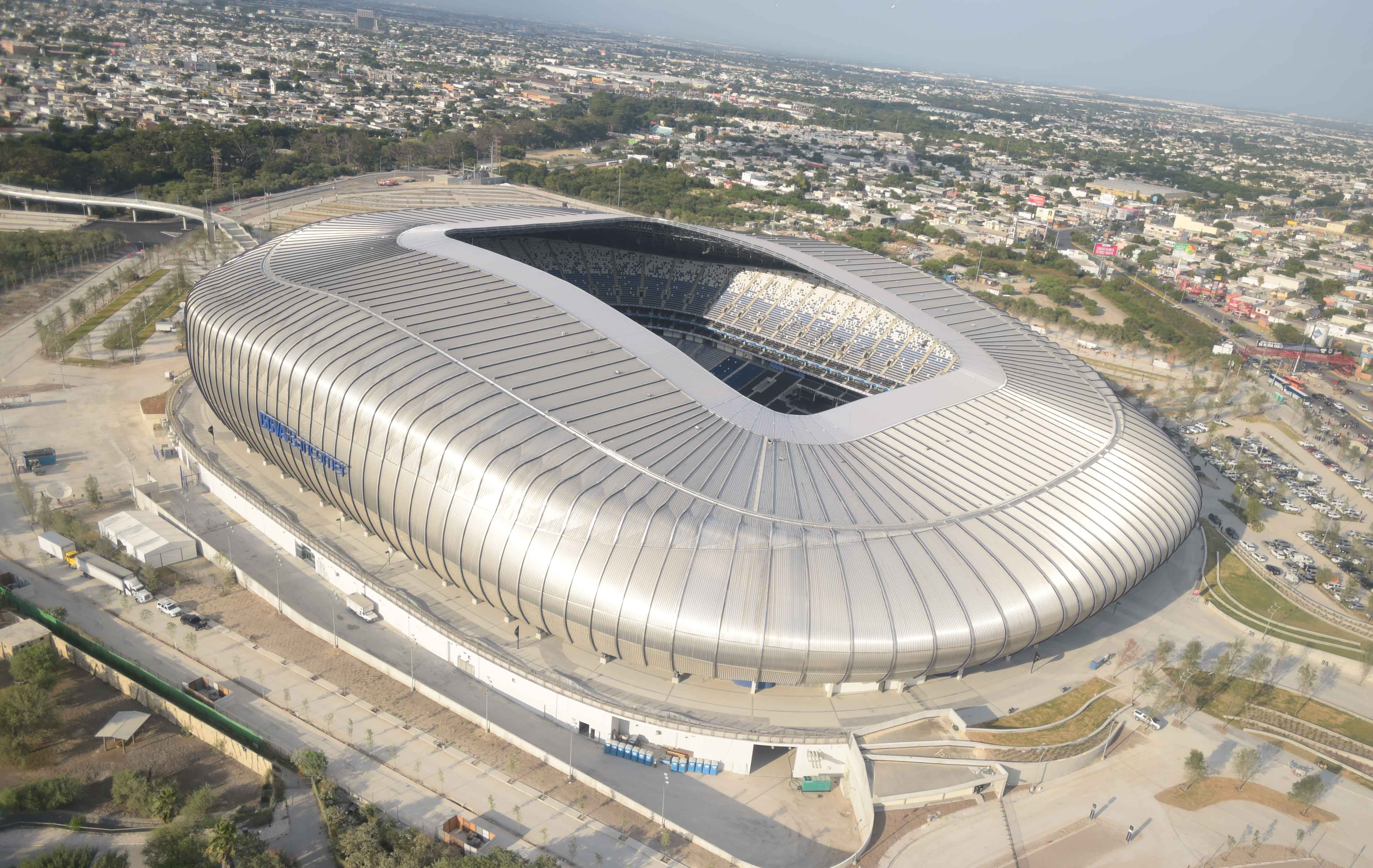
- Estadio BBVA
- Event: 2022 CONCACAF W Championship
United States	Canada
1	0
- Date: 18 July 2022
- Venue: Estadio BBVA, Guadalupe
- Referee: Katia García (Mexico)
- Attendance: 17,247

The 2022 CONCACAF W Championship Final was an association football match between Canada and the United States that took place on 18 July 2022. The match determined the winner of the 2022 CONCACAF W Championship at Estadio BBVA in Guadalupe, Mexico. It was the 11th final of the CONCACAF W Championship, a quadrennial tournament that consists of the women's national teams from CONCACAF to determine the best women's football country in North America, Central America, and the Caribbean.

Both countries had already qualified for the 2023 FIFA Women's World Cup. However, the winner qualified directly for the 2024 Summer Olympics and the 2024 CONCACAF W Gold Cup, whereas the runner-up would play the third-placed team in a two-leg play-off for both tournaments as the seeded team (home team in second leg).

== Background ==
The final was the 34th meeting between the two countries, with the United States leading the all-time series against Canada 27–6–1. However, the United States' lone loss to Canada came from the most recent result, a 1–0 loss in the semi-finals of the 2020 Summer Olympics. The United States is also the most historically successful team in the CONCACAF W Championship, since they won 8 of the 10 previous championships, with Canada obtaining the other two.

== Route to the final ==
United States
Round
Canada
Opponent
Result
Group stage
Opponent
Result
Haiti
3–0
Match 1
Trinidad and Tobago
6–0
Jamaica
5–0
Match 2
Panama
1–0
Mexico
1–0
Match 3
Costa Rica
2–0
Group A winners

Pos	Team	Pld	Pts
1	United States	3	9
2	Jamaica	3	6
3	Haiti	3	3
4	Mexico (H)	3	0

Source: CONCACAF
(H) Hosts
Final standings
Group B winners

Pos	Team	Pld	Pts
1	Canada	3	9
2	Costa Rica	3	6
3	Panama	3	3
4	Trinidad and Tobago	3	0

Source: CONCACAF
Opponent
Result
Knockout stage
Opponent
Result
Costa Rica
3–0
Semifinals
Jamaica
3–0

=== United States ===
The United States qualified for the 2022 CONCACAF W Championship by placing in the top two of the FIFA Women's World Rankings. The Americans were placed in Group A along with Haiti, Jamaica, and hosts Mexico. The team is managed by Vlatko Andonovski, who most notably coached the team to a bronze medal in the 2020 Summer Olympics. The United States began their run with a match against Haiti, who many experts predicted would be a 5–0 rout in favor of the US. However, after two goals were made by Alex Morgan by the 23rd minute, the US struggled to accurately make their shots on goal, as the shots on target accuracy would be 29%. However, their 3–0 win would soon be validated as Haiti made an upset against Mexico in a 3–0 win.

The United States won against Jamaica in a 5–0 rout, thus securing their spot in the knockout stage and the 2023 FIFA Women's World Cup. The match began with two goals by Sophia Smith in the 5th and 8th minute, and rounded out in the 2nd half with the help of Rose Lavelle, Kristie Mewis, and Trinity Rodman. In the last match of Group A, the United States was up against Mexico, who was underperforming relative to their projected placement in the tournament. However, Mexico put up a defensive fight against the United States, as they only conceded one goal in the 89th minute by Kristie Mewis. The United States would finish the group stage by sweeping Group A.

The United States played against Group B runner-ups Costa Rica in the semi-finals. The United States began with a slow start, as the first goal did not come until Emily Sonnett scored by rebounding the ball into the net in the 34th minute. The pace of the match continued the same as the first half came to a close, since the next goal came from the backheel of Mallory Pugh in the 45+4th minute. The match ended with a quick goal from Ashley Sanchez's attack in the 90+5th minute. Although Costa Rica defended the United States well, there was little to no offense from the Costa Ricans, as there was only one shot in the 3–0 loss, which was not on goal.

=== Canada ===
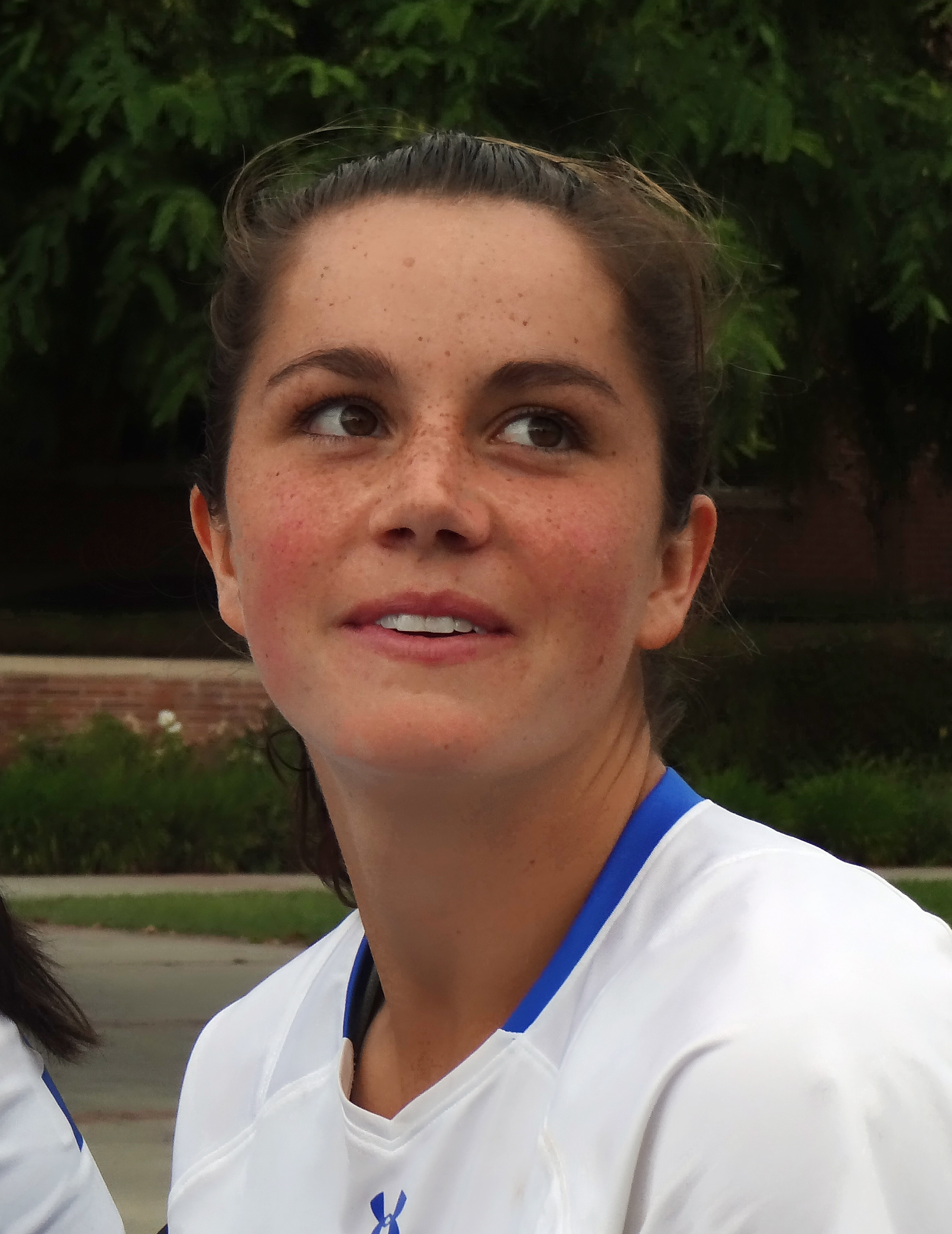
Jessie Fleming entered the final as one of the three top scorers with three goals in the tournament.

Canada qualified for the 2022 CONCACAF W Championship by placing in the top two of the FIFA Women's World Rankings. The Canadians were placed in Group B along with Costa Rica, Panama, and Trinidad and Tobago. The team is managed by Bev Priestman, who most notably coached the team to a gold medal in the 2020 Summer Olympics. Canada began their run with a match against Trinidad and Tobago, which ended with a 6–0 domination against the Trinbagonians. The match did take a bit for the Canadians to adapt to, as there was only one goal scored by Christine Sinclair in the first half. However, Canada rolled out in the 2nd half with five goals and had thirteen shots on target.

Canada began their next match of the group stage against Panama, which surprisingly led to a 1–0 win when experts predicted more goals from the Canadian side. The most contributing factor was Panamanian goalkeeper Yenith Bailey having five saves, with Julia Grosso scoring in the 64th minute as the only goal Bailey gave up. Nevertheless, Canada secured their spot in the knockout stage and the 2023 FIFA Women's World Cup after this match. The final match of the group stage was against Costa Rica, which ended in a solid 2–0 defensive-oriented win. Two of the three shots on target ended in goals with the help of Jessie Fleming in the 5th and Sophie Schmidt in the 69th minute. Canada would finish the group stage by sweeping Group B.

Canada played against Group A runner-ups Jamaica in the semi-finals. Canada secured the appearance in the final against the United States through a 3–0 win, that featured a healthy pace of goals. Canada's victory originated from Jessie Fleming's header in the 18th minute, Allysha Chapman's header with an assist from Adriana Leon in the 64th minute, and a goal from Leon herself in the 76th minute. Likewise to the offensive performance of Costa Rica against the United States, Jamaica showed little offense as there was only one shot in the entire game, which was not on target.

== Venue ==
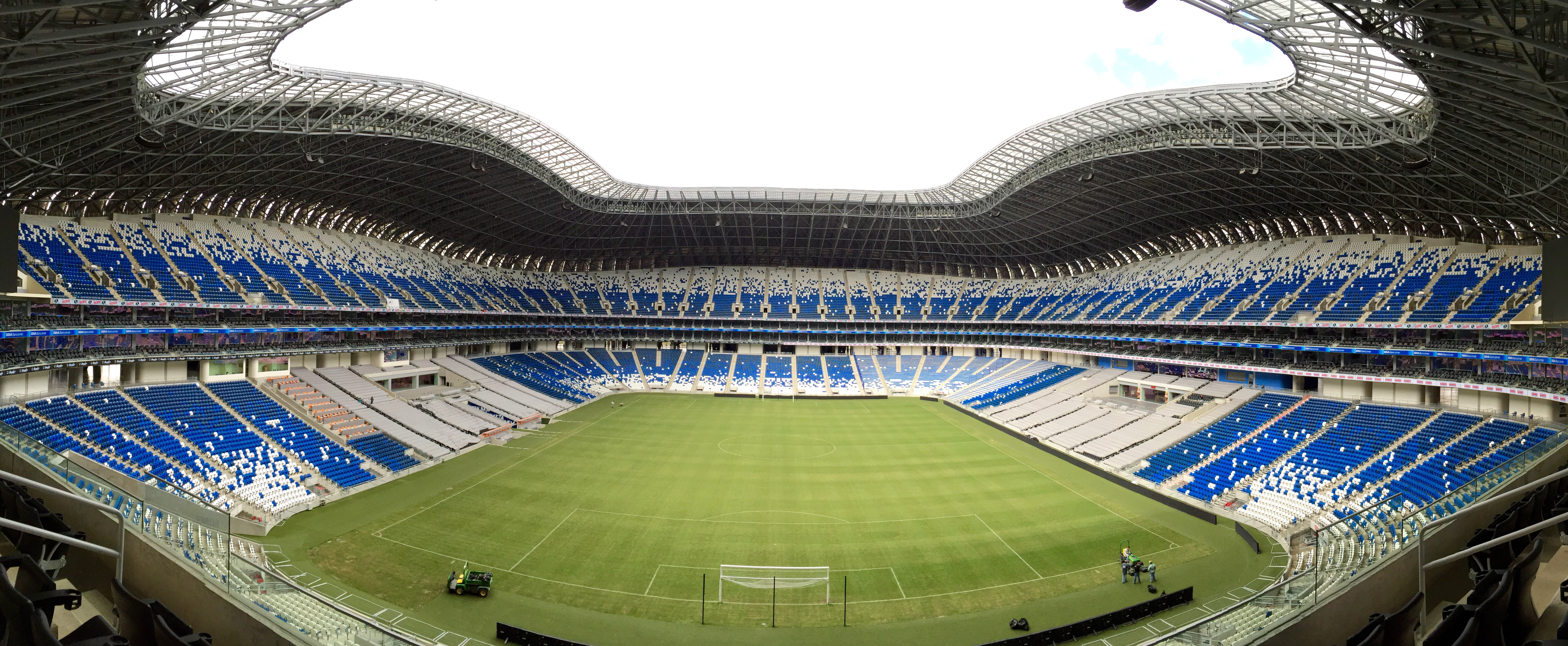
The interior view of Estadio BBVA.

The final was played at Estadio BBVA, a 51,000-seat stadium in the Monterrey suburb of Guadalupe in Mexico. The stadium – which opened in 2015 – features a pitch that is mostly used for association football; the only tenant for women's sports is C.F. Monterrey, which is a member of the Liga MX competition. The venue was chosen for the final over Estadio Universitario, due to Estadio BBVA being more modern from its opening date. International football activity outside of friendlies have never occurred prior to the 2022 CONCACAF W Championship. However, the stadium is one of the three official Mexican venues for the 2026 FIFA World Cup on the men's side.

== Match ==
18 July 2022
21:00

United States	1–0	Canada
Morgan 78' (pen.)	Report (FIFA); Report (CONCACAF)

Estadio BBVA, Guadalupe
Attendance: 17,247
Referee: Katia García (Mexico)

2022 CONCACAF W Championship winners

United States
9th title

United States

Canada

Formation: 4–3–3
GK	1	Alyssa Naeher
LB	8	Sofia Huerta
CB	3	Alana Cook
CB	4	Becky Sauerbrunn
RB	19	Emily Fox
CM	16	Rose Lavelle	(substituted off) 90+2'
CM	10	Lindsey Horan	(yellow card) 41'
CM	17	Andi Sullivan
RW	9	Mallory Pugh	(substituted off) 89'
CF	13	Alex Morgan	(substituted off) 89'
LW	11	Sophia Smith	(substituted off) 89'
Substitutions:
DF	12	Naomi Girma	(substituted on) 89'
FW	6	Trinity Rodman	(substituted on) 89'
FW	23	Margaret Purce	(substituted on) 89'
MF	20	Taylor Kornieck	(substituted on) 90+2'
Manager:
(North Macedonia) Vlatko Andonovski

Formation: 4–3–3
GK	1	Kailen Sheridan
LB	8	Jayde Riviere	(substituted off) 61'
CB	3	Kadeisha Buchanan
CB	14	Vanessa Gilles
RB	10	Ashley Lawrence
CM	11	Desiree Scott
CM	5	Quinn	(substituted off) 57'
CM	17	Jessie Fleming
RW	16	Janine Beckie
CF	12	Christine Sinclair	(yellow card) 46' (substituted off) 68'
LW	15	Nichelle Prince	(substituted off) 68'
Substitutions:
MF	7	Julia Grosso	(substituted on) 57'
DF	2	Allysha Chapman	(substituted on) 61'
FW	9	Jordyn Huitema	(substituted on) 68'
FW	19	Adriana Leon	(substituted on) 68'
Manager:
(England) Bev Priestman
