= 2022 CONCACAF W Championship Group A =

The 2022 CONCACAF W Championship Group A was one of the two groups in the group stage of the 2022 CONCACAF W Championship, held from 4–11 July 2022 in Mexico. The teams in this group were Haiti, Jamaica, hosts Mexico, and the United States. The top two teams qualified for the knockout stage and the 2023 FIFA Women's World Cup, while the third-placed team qualified for the 2023 FIFA Women's World Cup repêchage.

== Teams ==
Draw position	Team	Pot	Federation	Method of qualification	Date of qualification	Finals appearance	Last appearance	Previous best performance	FIFA Rankings
A1	United States	1	NAFU	FIFA Women's World Rankings	10 December 2020	10th	2018	Champions (1991, 1993, 1994, 2000, 2002, 2006, 2014, 2018)	1
A2	Mexico	2	NAFU	Qualification Group A winner	12 April 2022	10th	2018	Runners-up (1998, 2010)	26
A3	Jamaica	3	CFU	Qualification Group C winner	12 April 2022	7th	2018	Third place (2018)	51
A4	Haiti	4	CFU	Qualification Group E winner	12 April 2022	6th	2014	Fourth place (1991)	60

== Standings ==
Pos	Team	Pld	W	D	L	GF	GA	GD	Pts	Qualification
1	United States	3	3	0	0	9	0	+9	9	Qualification for Women's World Cup and advance to knockout stage
2	Jamaica	3	2	0	1	5	5	0	6	Qualification for Women's World Cup and advance to knockout stage
3	Haiti	3	1	0	2	3	7	−4	3	Advance to inter-confederation play-offs
4	Mexico (H)	3	0	0	3	0	5	−5	0	

Source: CONCACAF
Rules for classification: Tiebreakers
(H) Hosts

== Matches ==
All times are local, CDT (UTC−5).

=== United States vs Haiti ===
4 July 2022
18:00

United States	3–0	Haiti
Morgan 16', 23'; Purce 84'	Report (FIFA); Report (CONCACAF)

Estadio Universitario, San Nicolás de los Garza
Attendance: 5,345
Referee: Marie-Soleil Beaudoin (Canada)

United States

Team stats
United States	Statistic	Haiti
17	Shots	7
5	Shots on target	2
69%	Possession	31%
545	Passes	252
85%	Pass accuracy	70%
9	Fouls	11
1	Yellow cards	1
0	Red cards	0
6	Offsides	0
4	Corners	1

Haiti

Formation: 4–3–3
GK	18	Casey Murphy
LB	19	Emily Fox	(yellow card) 41'
CB	4	Becky Sauerbrunn
CB	3	Alana Cook
RB	5	Kelley O'Hara	(substituted off) 68'
CM	16	Rose Lavelle	(substituted off) 59'
DM	17	Andi Sullivan
CM	10	Lindsey Horan	(substituted off) 68'
LW	9	Mallory Pugh	(substituted off) 74'
CF	13	Alex Morgan
RW	11	Sophia Smith	(substituted off) 46'
Substitutions:
DF	8	Sofia Huerta	(substituted in) 68'
MF	22	Kristie Mewis	(substituted in) 68'
FW	23	Margaret Purce	(substituted in) 46'
FW	15	Megan Rapinoe	(substituted in) 74'
MF	2	Ashley Sanchez	(substituted in) 59'
Manager:
(North Macedonia) Vlatko Andonovski

Formation: 4–4–2
GK	23	Lara Larco
RB	2	Chelsea Surpris
CB	14	Claire Constant
CB	20	Kethna Louis
LB	21	Ruthny Mathurin
RM	10	Nérilia Mondésir	(substituted off) 90+2'
CM	3	Jennyfer Limage
CM	9	Sherly Jeudy
LM	7	Batcheba Louis	(substituted off) 90'
RS	6	Melchie Dumornay
LS	22	Roselord Borgella	(yellow card) 45' (substituted off) 90'
Substitutions:
MF	13	Betina Petit-Frère	(substituted in) 90'
FW	15	Florsie Joseph	(substituted in) 90'
MF	16	Milan Pierre-Jérôme	(substituted in) 90+2'
Manager:
(France) Nicolas Delépine

Player of the Match:
(United States) Alex Morgan

=== Mexico vs Jamaica ===
4 July 2022
21:00

Mexico	0–1	Jamaica
	Report (FIFA); Report (CONCACAF)	Shaw 8'

Estadio Universitario, San Nicolás de los Garza
Attendance: 5,291
Referee: Tatiana Guzmán (Nicaragua)

Mexico

Team stats
Mexico	Statistic	Jamaica
12	Shots	13
6	Shots on target	9
58%	Possession	42%
325	Passes	200
86%	Pass accuracy	91%
8	Fouls	11
1	Yellow cards	2
0	Red cards	0
2	Offsides	1
5	Corners	2

Jamaica

Formation: 4–4–2
GK	1	Emily Alvarado
LB	2	Kenti Robles	(substituted off) 80'
CB	14	Casandra Montero	(yellow card) 39'
CB	4	Rebeca Bernal
RB	13	Bianca Sierra
LM	7	Myra Delgadillo	(substituted off) 51'
CM	8	Carolina Jaramillo	(substituted off) 67'
CM	6	Alexia Delgado	(substituted off) 67'
RM	11	María Sánchez	(substituted off) 80'
LS	10	Stephany Mayor
RS	22	Diana Ordóñez
Substitutions:
DF	5	Jimena López	(substituted in) 80'
FW	17	Jacqueline Ovalle	(substituted in) 51'
FW	18	Joseline Montoya	(substituted in) 80'
MF	20	Diana García	(substituted in) 67'
FW	19	Alicia Cervantes	(substituted in) 67'
Manager:
Mónica Vergara

Formation: 4–2–3–1
GK	13	Rebecca Spencer	(yellow card) 73'
RB	19	Tiernny Wiltshire	(substituted off) 87'
CB	17	Allyson Swaby
CB	4	Chantelle Swaby
LB	14	Deneisha Blackwood	(yellow card) 53'
CM	6	Havana Solaun	(substituted off) 86'
DM	9	Drew Spence
RW	10	Jody Brown
AM	20	Atlanta Primus
LW	16	Paige Bailey-Gayle	(substituted off) 68'
FW	11	Khadija Shaw
Substitutions:
DF	12	Jayda Hylton-Pelaia	(substituted in) 87'
DF	3	Vyan Sampson	(substituted in) 86'
FW	15	Kalyssa Van Zanten	(substituted in) 68'
Manager:
Lorne Donaldson

Player of the Match:
(Jamaica) Khadija Shaw

=== Jamaica vs United States ===
7 July 2022
18:00

Jamaica	0–5	United States
	Report (FIFA); Report (CONCACAF)	Smith 5', 8'; Lavelle 59'; Mewis 83' (pen.); Rodman 86'

Estadio BBVA, Guadalupe
Attendance: 3,150
Referee: Melissa Borjas (Honduras)

Jamaica

Team stats
Jamaica	Statistic	United States
2	Shots	17
1	Shots on target	12
39%	Possession	61%
172	Passes	323
91%	Pass accuracy	89%
7	Fouls	9
1	Yellow cards	1
0	Red cards	0
0	Offsides	4
0	Corners	6

United States

Formation: 4–3–3
GK	13	Rebecca Spencer
RB	19	Tiernny Wiltshire
CB	17	Allyson Swaby	(yellow card) 90+4'
CB	4	Chantelle Swaby
LB	14	Deneisha Blackwood
CM	6	Havana Solaun	(substituted off) 46'
DM	7	Chinyelu Asher
CM	10	Jody Brown	(substituted off) 46'
RW	18	Trudi Carter	(substituted off) 75'
CF	20	Atlanta Primus	(substituted off) 63'
LW	11	Khadija Shaw	(substituted off) 63'
Substitutions:
DF	3	Vyan Sampson	(substituted in) 46'
MF	9	Drew Spence	(substituted in) 63'
FW	15	Kalyssa Van Zanten	(substituted in) 63'
MF	16	Paige Bailey-Gayle	(substituted in) 46'
FW	8	Kayla McCoy	(substituted in) 75'
Manager:
Lorne Donaldson

Formation: 4–3–3
GK	1	Alyssa Naeher
LB	19	Emily Fox	(substituted off) 46'
CB	12	Naomi Girma
CB	3	Alana Cook
RB	8	Sofia Huerta
CM	16	Rose Lavelle	(substituted off) 65'
DM	2	Ashley Sanchez	(yellow card) 45+5'
CM	10	Lindsey Horan	(substituted off) 61'
LW	9	Mallory Pugh
CF	7	Ashley Hatch	(substituted off) 61'
RW	11	Sophia Smith	(substituted off) 46'
Substitutions:
DF	14	Emily Sonnett	(substituted in) 46'
MF	20	Taylor Kornieck	(substituted in) 65'
MF	22	Kristie Mewis	(substituted in) 61'
FW	23	Margaret Purce	(substituted in) 46'
FW	6	Trinity Rodman	(substituted in) 61'
Manager:
(North Macedonia) Vlatko Andonovski

Player of the Match:
(United States) Sophia Smith

=== Haiti vs Mexico ===
7 July 2022
21:00

Haiti	3–0	Mexico
Borgella 14' (pen.); Mondésir 67' (pen.); Jeudy 78'	Report (FIFA); Report (CONCACAF)

Estadio BBVA, Guadalupe
Attendance: 3,375
Referee: Marianela Araya (Costa Rica)

Haiti

Team stats
Haiti	Statistic	Mexico
9	Shots	11
3	Shots on target	7
39%	Possession	61%
170	Passes	311
87%	Pass accuracy	85%
10	Fouls	14
0	Yellow cards	3
0	Red cards	1
2	Offsides	0
2	Corners	2

Mexico

Formation: 4–2–3–1
GK	12	Nahomie Ambroise
RB	2	Chelsea Surpris	(substituted off) 90'
CB	14	Claire Constant
CB	20	Kethna Louis
LB	21	Ruthny Mathurin
CM	9	Sherly Jeudy
CM	3	Jennyfer Limage
RW	10	Nérilia Mondésir
AM	6	Melchie Dumornay	(substituted off) 83'
LW	7	Batcheba Louis
CF	22	Roselord Borgella	(substituted off) 82'
Substitutions:
MF	16	Milan Pierre-Jerome	(substituted in) 90'
FW	15	Florsie Joseph	(substituted in) 83'
FW	17	Mikerline Saint-Félix	(substituted in) 82'
Manager:
(France) Nicolas Delépine

Formation: 4–3–3
GK	1	Emily Alvarado	(yellow card) 65'
RB	2	Kenti Robles	(yellow card) 70'
CB	4	Rebeca Bernal	(yellow card) 19' (substituted off) 74'
CB	3	Greta Espinoza	(red card) 77'
LB	5	Jimena López
CM	20	Diana García
DM	6	Alexia Delgado	(substituted off) 80'
CM	10	Stephany Mayor
LW	7	Myra Delgadillo	(substituted off) 46'
CF	9	Katty Martínez	(substituted off) 65'
RW	11	María Sánchez	(substituted off) 90'
Substitutions:
DF	4	Rebeca Bernal	(substituted in) 74'
FW	17	Jacqueline Ovalle	(substituted in) 65'
FW	18	Joseline Montoya	(substituted in) 90'
FW	19	Alicia Cervantes	(substituted in) 46'
FW	22	Diana Ordóñez	(substituted in) 80'
Manager:
Mónica Vergara

Player of the Match:
(Haiti) Sherly Jeudy

=== Jamaica vs Haiti ===
11 July 2022
21:00

Jamaica	4–0	Haiti
Carter 26'; Shaw 58', 70' (pen.); Spence 79'	Report (FIFA); Report (CONCACAF)

Estadio BBVA, Guadalupe
Attendance: 4,356
Referee: Ekaterina Koroleva (United States)

Jamaica

Team stats
Jamaica	Statistic	Haiti
13	Shots	12
8	Shots on target	3
61%	Possession	39%
386	Passes	244
68%	Pass accuracy	58%
11	Fouls	13
0	Yellow cards	4
0	Red cards	0
2	Offsides	0
5	Corners	4

Haiti

Formation: 4–3–3
GK	13	Rebecca Spencer
RB	19	Tiernny Wiltshire
CB	17	Allyson Swaby
CB	4	Chantelle Swaby
LB	2	Satara Murray
CM	10	Jody Brown
DM	6	Havana Solaun	(substituted off) 62'
CM	9	Drew Spence	(substituted off) 86'
RW	18	Trudi Carter	(substituted off) 84'
CF	20	Atlanta Primus	(substituted off) 85'
LW	11	Khadija Shaw
Substitutions:
DF	3	Vyan Sampson	(substituted in) 62'
MF	7	Chinyelu Asher	(substituted in) 85'
FW	21	Olufolasade Adamolekun	(substituted in) 86'
FW	22	Mireya Grey	(substituted in) 84'
Manager:
Lorne Donaldson

Formation: 4–5–1
GK	12	Nahomie Ambroise
RB	2	Chelsea Surpris
CB	14	Claire Constant	(yellow card) 69'
CB	20	Kethna Louis	(yellow card) 76'
LB	21	Ruthny Mathurin	(yellow card) 44' (substituted off) 72'
CM	9	Sherly Jeudy	(substituted off) 82'
RM	3	Jennyfer Limage	(yellow card) 82'
RM	10	Nérilia Mondésir	(substituted off) 81'
LM	6	Melchie Dumornay
LM	7	Batcheba Louis
CF	22	Roselord Borgella	(substituted off) 72'
Substitutions:
DF	5	Maudeline Moryl	(substituted in) 82'
MF	13	Betina Petit Frère	(substituted in) 72'
FW	15	Florsie Joseph	(substituted in) 81'
FW	17	Mikerline Saint-Félix	(substituted in) 72'
Manager:
(France) Nicolas Delépine

Player of the Match:
(Jamaica) Khadija Shaw

=== United States vs Mexico ===
11 July 2022
21:00

United States	1–0	Mexico
Mewis 89'	Report (FIFA); Report (CONCACAF)

Estadio Universitario, San Nicolás de los Garza
Attendance: 20,522
Referee: Myriam Marcotte (Canada)

United States

Team stats
United States	Statistic	Mexico
12	Shots	3
5	Shots on target	2
59%	Possession	41%
376	Passes	228
90%	Pass accuracy	75%
5	Fouls	10
0	Yellow cards	2
0	Red cards	1
2	Offsides	0
12	Corners	1

Mexico

Formation: 4–3–3
GK	18	Casey Murphy
RB	5	Kelley O'Hara	(substituted off) 64'
CB	12	Naomi Girma
CB	4	Becky Sauerbrunn
LB	14	Emily Sonnett
RM	2	Ashley Sanchez
CM	17	Andi Sullivan	(substituted off) 64'
CM	13	Alex Morgan	(substituted off) 80'
LM	10	Lindsey Horan	(substituted off) 64'
CF	23	Margaret Purce
CF	11	Sophia Smith	(substituted off) 64'
Substitutions:
DF	8	Sofia Huerta	(substituted in) 64'
NF	16	Rose Lavelle	(substituted in) 64'
MF	20	Taylor Kornieck	(substituted in) 80'
MF	22	Kristie Mewis	(substituted in) 64'
FW	15	Megan Rapinoe	(substituted in) 64'
Manager:
(North Macedonia) Vlatko Andonovski

Formation: 4–4–2
GK	12	Itzel González
RB	2	Kenti Robles	(yellow card) 68' (substituted off) 75'
CB	15	Cristina Ferral	(yellow card) 34'
CB	14	Casandra Montero
LB	5	Jimena López
DM	6	Alexia Delgado	(substituted off) 75'
RM	20	Diana García
CM	10	Stephany Mayor
CM	8	Carolina Jaramillo	(substituted off) 61'
RW	11	María Sánchez	(substituted off) 85'
CF	19	Alicia Cervantes	(substituted off) 61'
Substitutions:
DF	13	Bianca Sierra	(substituted in) 75'
MF	23	Maricarmen Reyes	(substituted in) 75'
FW	17	Jacqueline Ovalle	(substituted in) 61' (red card) 73'
FW	18	Joseline Montoya	(substituted in) 85'
FW	22	Diana Ordóñez	(substituted in) 61'
Manager:
Mónica Vergara

Player of the Match:
(Mexico) Jimena López

== Discipline ==
Fair play points were used as tiebreakers in the group if the overall and head-to-head records of teams were tied. These are calculated based on yellow and red cards received in all group matches as follows:

- first yellow card: minus 1 point;
- indirect red card (second yellow card): minus 3 points;
- direct red card: minus 4 points;
- yellow card and direct red card: minus 5 points;

Team	Match 1				Match 2				Match 3				Points
Team	Booked	(yellow card) (yellow-red card)	Sent off (straight red)	(yellow card) (red card)	Booked	(yellow card) (yellow-red card)	Sent off (straight red)	(yellow card) (red card)	Booked	(yellow card) (yellow-red card)	Sent off (straight red)	(yellow card) (red card)	Points
United States	1				1								–2
Mexico (H)	1				3		1		2		1		–14
Jamaica	2				2								–4
Haiti	1								4				–5
