= Tiernny Wiltshire =

Jamaican footballer (born 1998)

Personal information
- Full name: Tiernny Arlene Wiltshire
- Date of birth: 8 May 1998 (age 28)
- Place of birth: Elmer, New Jersey, United States
- Height: 1.63 m (5 ft 4 in)
- Positions: Forward; defender

College career
Years	Team	Apps	(Gls)
2016–2019	Rutgers Scarlet Knights	70	(4)

Senior career*
Years	Team	Apps	(Gls)
2020–2021	Maccabi Emek Hefer	14	(7)
2021	Kuopio Palloseura	5	(0)
2022	Houston Dash	0	(0)
2023–2024	Reims	1	(0)

International career^{‡}
2019–2023	Jamaica	11	(0)
Medal record
Representing Jamaica
CONCACAF W Championship
Third place	2022 Mexico
- * Club domestic league appearances and goals as of 18 September 2023 ‡ National team caps and goals as of 18 September 2023

Tiernny Arlene Wiltshire (born 8 May 1998) is a professional footballer who plays as a forward. Born in the United States, she represents Jamaica internationally.

== Club career ==
Wiltshire previously played for Israeli Ligat Nashim club Maccabi Emek Hefer during the 2020–2021 season. She made 14 appearances and scored seven goals (four regular-season league goals, two national cup goals, and one league cup goal). She returned to the U.S. upon the end of the season and joined the Houston Dash as a trialist.

In 2021, Wiltshire signed a short-term contract with Finnish Kansallinen Liiga team Kuopio Palloseura.

On 25 August 2022, Wiltshire was signed with the Houston Dash as a forward for the remainder of the 2022 season.

Wiltshire signed with French club Reims on September 2, 2023.

== International career ==
Wiltshire made her senior debut for Jamaica on 30 September 2019.
