= Mireya Grey =

Jamaican footballer (born 1998)

Personal information
- Full name: Mireya Aleshannee Delta Grey
- Date of birth: 7 September 1998 (age 28)
- Place of birth: Seattle, Washington, United States
- Height: 1.60 m (5 ft 3 in)
- Position: Forward

Youth career
- Crossfire Premier

College career
Years	Team	Apps	(Gls)
2017–2021	Washington Huskies	43	(1)

Senior career*
Years	Team	Apps	(Gls)
2018–2022	Seattle Sounders Women	3	(2)

International career^{‡}
2018	Jamaica U20	3	(0)
2019–	Jamaica	8	(1)
Medal record
Representing Jamaica
CONCACAF W Championship
Third place	2022 Mexico
- * Club domestic league appearances and goals as of 12 May 2020 ‡ National team caps and goals as of 19 May 2019

Mireya Aleshannee Delta Grey (born 7 September 1998) is a professional footballer who plays as a forward. Born in the United States, she represents Jamaica internationally.

== International career ==
Grey represented Jamaica at the 2018 CONCACAF Women's U-20 Championship. She made her senior debut in a 3–1 friendly win against Panama on 19 May 2019. She was a last minute replacement for injured Kayla McCoy taking her place at the 2019 FIFA Women's World Cup.

=== International goals ===
Scores and results list Jamaica's goal tally first

No.	Date	Venue	Opponent	Score	Result	Competition
1	6 August 2019	Estadio Universidad San Marcos, Lima, Peru	Peru	1–0	1–0	2019 Pan American Games
