= Emily Sonnett =

American soccer player (born 1993)

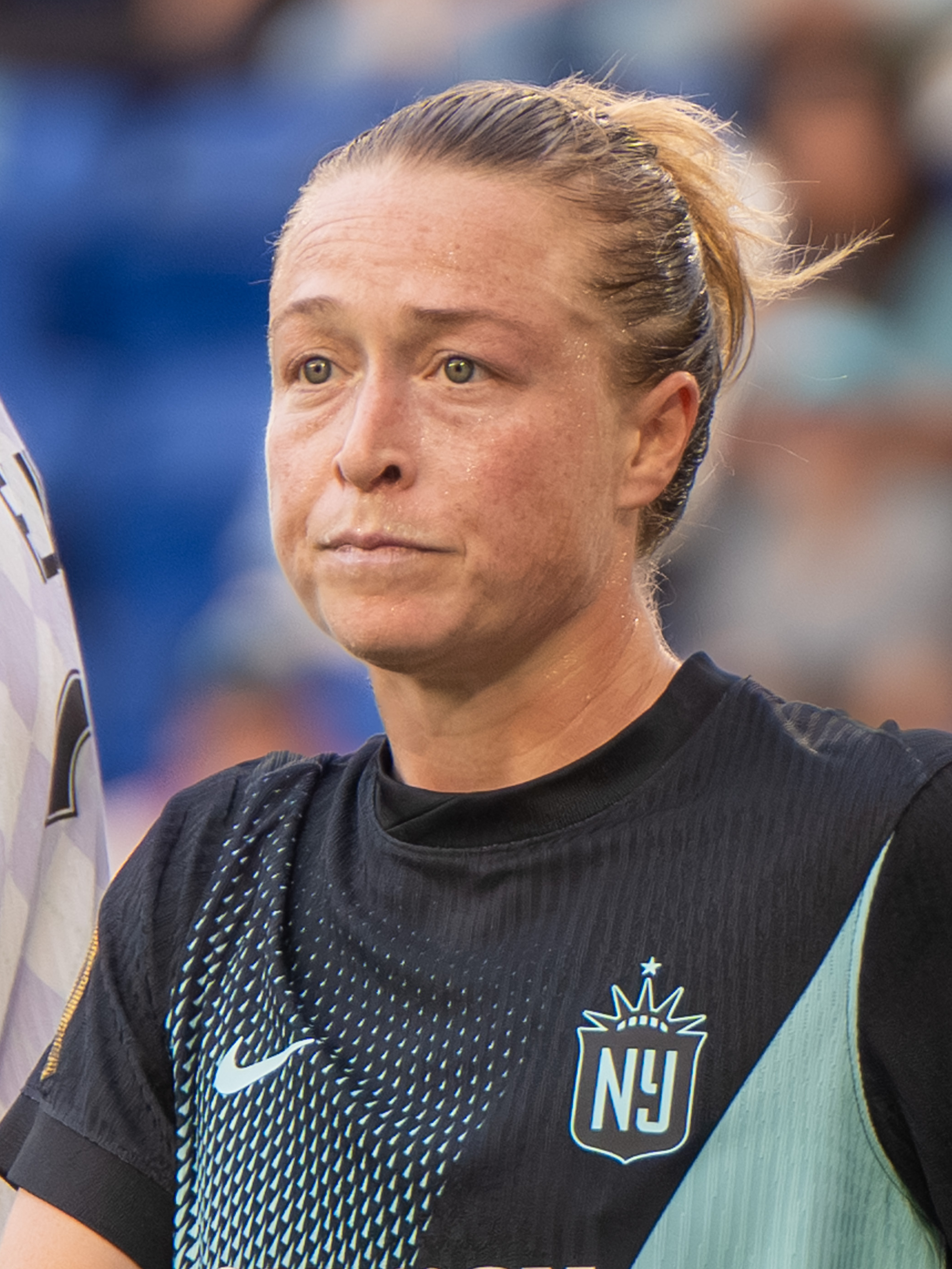
- Sonnett with Gotham FC in 2025

Personal information
- Full name: Emily Ann Sonnett
- Date of birth: November 25, 1993 (age 32)
- Place of birth: Marietta, Georgia, U.S.
- Height: 5 ft 7 in (1.70 m)
- Positions: Center back; full back; defensive midfielder

Team information
- Current team: Gotham FC
- Number: 6

Youth career
- 2003–2013: NASA 12 Elite II

College career
Years	Team	Apps	(Gls)
2012–2015	Virginia Cavaliers	98	(6)

Senior career*
Years	Team	Apps	(Gls)
2016–2019	Portland Thorns FC	72	(6)
2017–2018	→ Sydney FC (loan)	11	(1)
2020	Orlando Pride	0	(0)
2020	Kopparbergs/Göteborg FC	10	(0)
2021–2022	Washington Spirit	25	(0)
2023	OL Reign	19	(0)
2024–	Gotham FC	64	(0)

International career^{‡}
2011–2012	United States U18		
2013–2015	United States U23	6	(0)
2015–	United States	118	(2)
Medal record
Representing United States
CONCACAF W Championship
Winner	2018 United States
Winner	2022 Mexico
FIFA Women's World Cup
Gold medal – first place	2019 France
Olympic Games
Gold medal – first place	2024 Paris	Team
Bronze medal – third place	2020 Tokyo	Team
CONCACAF W Gold Cup
Winner	2024 United States
- * Club domestic league appearances and goals as of November 1, 2026 ‡ National team caps and goals as of June 9, 2026

Emily Ann Sonnett (born November 25, 1993) is an American professional soccer player who plays for Gotham FC of the National Women's Soccer League (NWSL) and the United States national team. She can play the positions of center back, full back, or defensive midfielder.

Sonnett played college soccer for the Virginia Cavaliers. She was drafted first overall by the Portland Thorns in the 2016 NWSL College Draft. She has won three NWSL Championships, with the Thorns in 2017, the Washington Spirit in 2021, and Gotham in 2025.

At the international level, Sonnett was on the United States squad that won the 2019 FIFA Women's World Cup, bronze at the 2020 Tokyo Olympics, and gold at the 2024 Paris Olympics. She is an eight-time winner of the invitational SheBelieves Cup.

== Early life and education ==
Sonnett was born in Marietta, Georgia to Bill and Jane Sonnett. She has a twin sister, Emma, who played soccer for the University of Georgia.

=== North Atlanta Soccer Association (2003–2013) ===
Sonnett, along with her sister, began playing for North Atlanta Soccer Association (NASA) in 2003. With NASA, the Sonnetts earned back-to-back Georgia State Cup Championship titles in 2007 and 2008 and also the Region III League Championship title in 2008. In the 2011 US Youth Soccer National Championship Series, NASA 12 Elite II placed third in U-17 standings, and Sonnett was named to the U-17 Best XI as a midfielder.

In 2013, Sonnett, playing in the midfield position, helped NASA 12 Elite II win the U-19 national title at the 2013 US Youth Soccer National Championship Series in Overland Park, Kansas. At the conclusion of the tournament, she was named to the U-19 Best XI and also earned the Golden Ball award as the best player at the tournament.

=== Fellowship Christian School (2008–2012) ===
Sonnett attended Fellowship Christian School in Roswell, Georgia, graduating in 2012.

In 2011 during Sonnett's junior season, Fellowship Christian's varsity girls soccer team reached the Final Four of the Class A state tournament, losing 0–2 to the eventual state champions, First Presbyterian Day School, in the semi-final. The following year, Fellowship Christian, with Sonnett as captain, reached the 2012 Georgia state championship game and again faced First Presbyterian Day School ultimately losing 0–1. Sonnett ended her career at Fellowship Christian as the school's leading scorer with 113 goals and 41 assists.

She was also named the 2011–2012 Gatorade Georgia Girls Soccer Player of the Year; Sonnett was the first ever athlete from Fellowship Christian School to win the award. Sonnett was also selected as 2011 Youth All-American by the National Soccer Coaches Association of America (NSCAA) and was also named to both 2011 and 2012 ESPN Rise 1st Team All-American.

In early February 2012, Sonnett signed her national letter of intent to play for the University of Virginia in the fall of 2012 on an athletic scholarship.

=== University of Virginia (2012–2015) ===
In her first season in 2012, UVA Cavaliers won the regular season Atlantic Coast Conference (ACC) title and made it to the round of 16 in the 2012 NCAA Women's Soccer Tournament. Sonnett herself was named to the ACC All-Freshman and All-Tournament Team. Though she was recruited as a center midfielder, Sonnett transitioned to the center back position early in her freshman year due to various injuries leaving the UVA back line bare and played in that position the remainder of her college career.

During her sophomore season, Sonnett earned 2 goals and 5 assists and started all 26 games, playing a total of 2,341 minutes and setting single-season record at UVA. She was also named to 1st Team All-ACC Team. Sonnett helped lead UVA to their first College Cup in 22 seasons, losing in the tournament's semifinal after double overtime to UCLA in penalty kicks, 1–1 (2–4).

In her junior year, Sonnett again started in all 26 games during the 2014 season and earned a total of 5 goals and 3 assists. UVA placed as runners-up to the ACC 2014 title, losing 0–1 to Florida State. At the conclusion of the tournament, Sonnett was named to the ACC All-Tournament Team. During quarterfinal of the 2014 NCAA women's tournament, Virginia defeated the defending champion, UCLA 2–1 with Sonnett scoring the opening goal in the 33rd minute ultimately ending UCLA's 969-minute shutout streak. In the semifinal match-up against Texas A&M, Sonnett again scored with a header off a corner kick, giving UVA a 2–1 lead. UVA ultimately defeated Texas A&M 3–1, earning a place in the university's first women's College Cup final. UVA ended their season with a 0–1 loss to Florida State in the national championship. Sonnett was then named the tournament's Most Outstanding Defensive Player and was also named a Third-Team NSCAA All-American.

In 2015, Sonnett spent the summer playing for pro-am team Atlanta Silverbacks, in the final season of the USL W-League. Returning to UVA for her senior year, she was named team captain at the beginning of the season. Mid-season in October 2015, Sonnett earned her first call-up and started her first cap (as center back) for the senior United States women's national soccer team against Brazil.

UVA were again runners-up to the 2015 ACC title, losing 2–2 (PK 6–7) to Florida State, and Sonnett was again named to ACC All-Tournament team. She led UVA to the quarterfinals of the 2015 NCAA women's tournament, losing to Rutgers University after double overtime in penalty kicks (6–7). Sonnett ended her senior season at UVA with 3 goals and 1 assist and was named a finalist for the Hermann Trophy. Additionally, Sonnett was named the 2015 ESPNW Soccer Player of the Year, Honda Sports Award Nominee, NSCAA first-team All-American, ACC Defensive Player of the Year, and first team All-ACC selection.

Sonnett left Charlottesville a semester early to enter the NWSL (after being drafted as the number one pick by Portland Thorns FC in January 2016) but ultimately did graduate with a degree in sociology from UVA.

== Club career ==
=== Portland Thorns FC (2016–2019) ===
On January 15, 2016, Sonnett was selected by Portland Thorns FC as the first overall pick in the 2016 NWSL College Draft. She made her debut with the Thorns on April 17, 2016. Her first professional goal came in the NWSL championship semi-final to bring the Thorns level with the Western New York Flash, though the Flash would go on to score the winning goal and ultimately win the championship. She was one of three finalists for NWSL Rookie of the Year.

Sonnett scored again in the NWSL post-season in the 2017 season, helping the Thorns to a 4–1 win over the Orlando Pride in the semi-final. They would go on to win the championship, with Sonnett tallying an assist on Lindsey Horan's game-winning goal.

In 2018 Sonnett appeared in 22 games for Portland, scoring one goal. Portland reached the NWSL Championship Game for the second straight year, but lost to North Carolina 3–0. She was named to the NWSL Team of the Month for March and April. Sonnett was one of four Portland Thorns named to the NWSL Best XI and was a finalist for Defender of the Year.

==== Loan to Sydney FC (2017) ====
On October 24, 2017, it was announced that Sonnett signed for Sydney FC for the 2017–18 W-League season. In her first appearance, she scored a penalty kick. During the semifinal against Newcastle Jets, she made a box to box run to assist Lisa De Vanna's game-winning goal in extra time.

=== Orlando Pride (2020) ===
On January 8, 2020, Sonnett was traded to Orlando Pride along with the NWSL rights to Caitlin Foord and two draft picks in exchange for Orlando's No. 1 overall selection in the 2020 NWSL College Draft. In March 2020, the NWSL announced an indefinite delay on the start of the 2020 NWSL season due to the COVID-19 pandemic. The NWSL eventually began with the smaller schedule 2020 NWSL Challenge Cup tournament in June. However, on June 22, Orlando Pride withdrew from the tournament following positive COVID-19 tests among both players and staff.

=== Kopparbergs/Göteborg FC (2020) ===
On August 18, 2020, having been unable to play for Orlando, Sonnett joined Swedish Damallsvenskan club Kopparbergs/Göteborg FC on a short-term contract until November 2020. Orlando retained Sonnett's NWSL rights. Five days later she made her Damallsvenskan debut, starting in a 3–0 defeat to Rosengård. She made 10 league appearances as Göteborg won its first Damallsvenskan title.

=== Washington Spirit (2021–2022) ===
On December 24, 2020, Sonnett was traded to the Washington Spirit in a deal that saw Meggie Dougherty Howard head to Orlando along with $140,000 in allocation money and the Spirit's 9th overall pick in the 2021 NWSL Draft.

In 2021 Sonnett appeared in 18 regular season matches for the Spirit helping Washington notch their first NWSL Championship by defeating the Chicago Red Stars, 2–1 in extra-time at Lynn Family Stadium in Louisville, Kentucky, on November 20, 2021.

During the 2022 NWSL Challenge Cup opener against the Orlando Pride, Sonnett suffered broken ribs after being kicked. Sonnett was placed on the SEI list on August 25, 2022, after sustaining a foot injury during the 2022 CONCACAF W Championship.

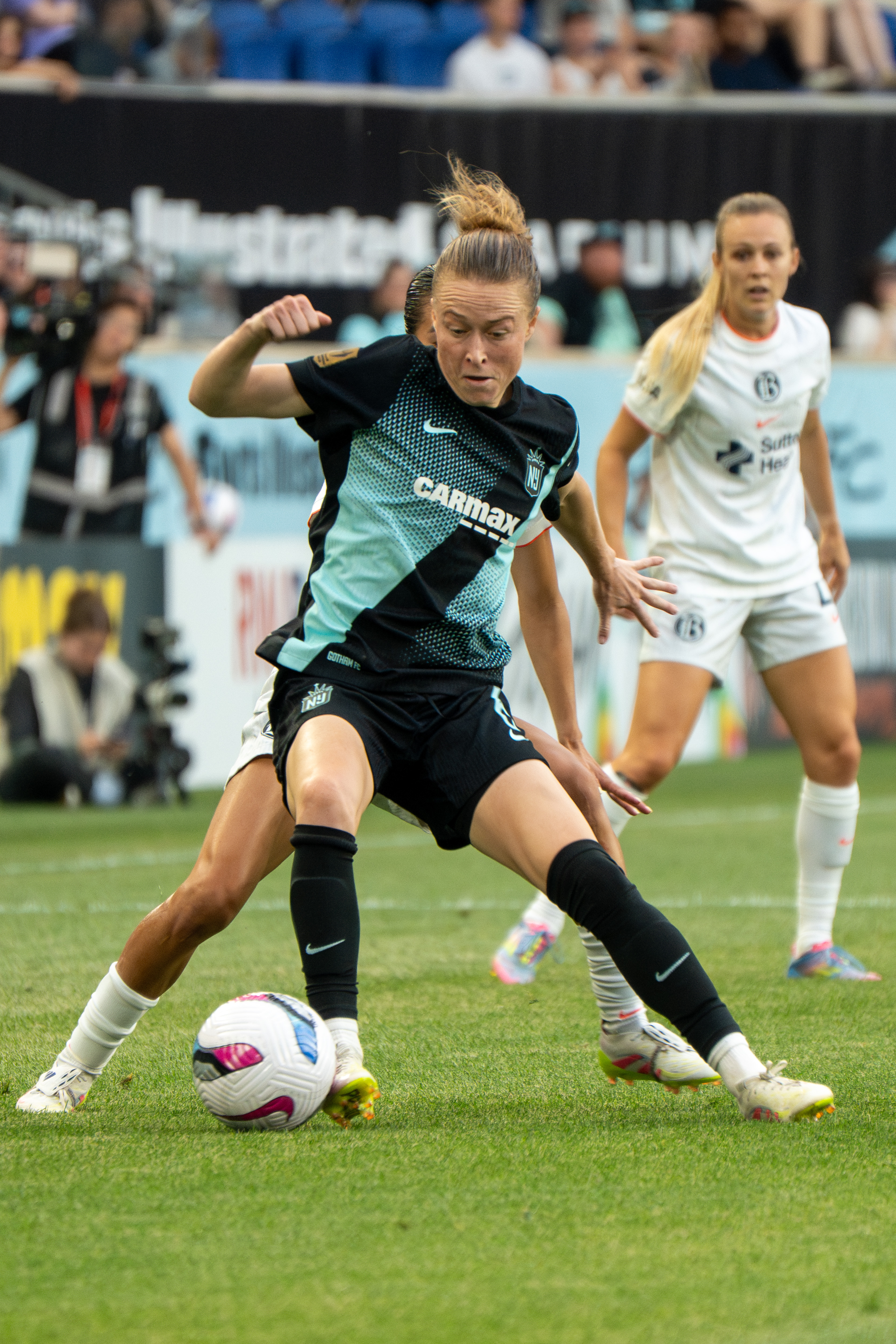
Emily Sonnett with Gotham FC in 2025

=== OL Reign (2023) ===
On January 12, 2023, Sonnett was traded to OL Reign in exchange for their 32nd overall draft pick in the 2023 NWSL Draft and their natural first-round pick in the 2024 NWSL Draft.

=== Gotham FC (2024–present) ===
On January 4, 2024, NJ/NY Gotham FC announced that Sonnett had signed a three-year deal with the club. She was one of four national team players who joined Gotham as free agents that off-season along with Crystal Dunn, Tierna Davidson, and Rose Lavelle. Sonnett made her club debut on the opening matchday, a 1–0 win over the Portland Thorns. She played the most minutes of any player for Gotham as they finished the season in third place.

On May 25, 2025, Sonnett was fouled inside the box in the 81st minute of the 2025 CONCACAF W Champions Cup final against Tigres. Esther scored on the rebound of the resulting penalty save as Gotham became the inaugural winners of the competition.

During the 2025 NWSL season Sonnett started every game for Gotham helping the team to their second NWSL Championship and earning a spot on the NWSL Best XI Second Team. Sonnett was subbed out of only one game all season and finished second in the league in successful passes. She became the second player to start five NWSL finals and became the first to win three championships with separate clubs.

On June 24, 2026, during a game against the Portland Thorns, Sonnett ruptured the patellar tendon in her left knee in a non-contact injury. She underwent surgery for the injury in the following days and the club announced that she would be out for the rest of the season. On November 1, 2026 Sonnett was present for the win of Gotham's first NWSL shield.

== International career ==
=== Youth national team (2011–2015) ===
In April 2011, Sonnett participated in the Southeast's Region III Olympic Development Program in Costa Rica. Sonnett received her first call-up to the United States U18 training camp as a midfielder in June 2011.

Sonnett received call-ups for the United States women's national under-23 soccer team training camps in April and December 2013. She later represented the United States as a center-back at the U23 level during the 2014 Six Nations Tournament in March 2014. Sonnett appeared in all three games, helping the team ultimately win the tournament title in the final against Norway.

In February 2015 Sonnett again appeared in all three games in the 2015 U-23 Six Nations International Tournament in La Manga, Spain helping the team earn their second consecutive tournament title and serving as captain in their match against Norway. Although Sonnett was called up to the USWNT U-23 training camp in Lakewood Ranch, Florida in April 2015, she was not named to the roster for the 2015 Four Nations International Nordic Tournament held in May 2015.

=== Senior national team debut (2015) ===
On October 16, 2015, Sonnett received her first senior call-up to the U.S. women's national soccer team (USWNT) from Jill Ellis. She received her first cap and start (while still a student at UVA) for the USWNT on October 25, 2015, at center back during a friendly against Brazil as part of the USWNT's 2015 FIFA Women's World Cup victory tour. She earned three more caps with the USWNT before the end of 2015 in friendlies against Trinidad and Tobago and China.

=== 2016 ===
In January 2016, Sonnett joined the national team for their first training camp of the year at the U.S. Soccer National Training Center in Carson, California and earned her second start in a friendly against the Republic of Ireland that same month. In February 2016, Sonnett was named to the USWNT roster for the 2016 CONCACAF Olympic Qualifying tournament, playing in two of the five games in the tournament. The USWNT's semi-final win over Trinidad and Tobago qualified the team for the 2016 Rio Olympics. The USWNT then went on to win CONCACAF title for the fourth consecutive year.

Sonnett was named to the roster for the 2016 SheBelieves Cup that took place in March 2016. Sonnett played the full 90 minutes in the tournament's opening match against England on March 3, 2016. The USWNT would go on to win the 2016 SheBelieves Cup after defeating Germany 2–1 in the final.

Sonnett was called up to all three training camps held in the spring and summer of 2016 and was named to rosters for friendlies against Colombia, Japan, and South Africa, appearing as a substitute for Becky Sauerbrunn during one of the friendlies against Colombia.

==== 2016 Olympics ====
In July 2016, Sonnett was named an alternate for the USWNT at the 2016 Rio Olympic Games, along with Ashlyn Harris, Sam Mewis, and Heather O'Reilly. The USWNT drew against Sweden in the quarterfinal but ultimately lost in a penalty shootout, 3–4, resulting in elimination from the tournament.

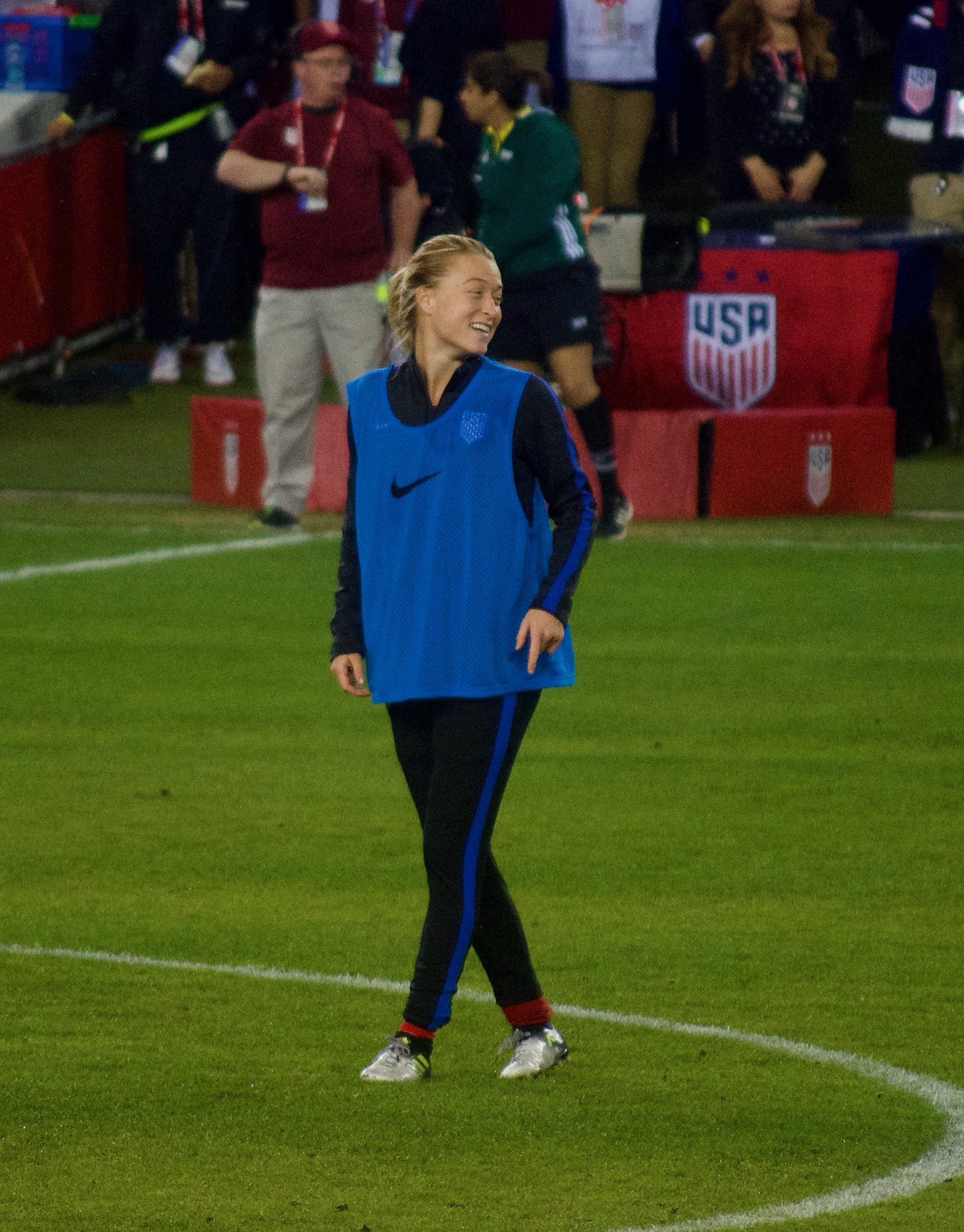
Sonnett during halftime at friendly in 2017

==== Post Olympics ====
For the remainder of 2016, Sonnett continued to earn caps for the USWNT, appearing in friendlies against Thailand, the Netherlands, and Switzerland.

=== 2017 ===
Sonnett dropped out of the USWNT rotation for the majority of 2017 and did not earn any international caps during the calendar year. Sonnett was called up for both the January and February training camps and was named to the roster for the 2017 SheBelieves Cup tournament in March but did not see any playing time. She was left off the USWNT roster entirely from April to October 2017 by coach, Jill Ellis. In November, Sonnett received her first call-up in over eight months for the pair of friendlies against Canada but did not earn any caps.

=== 2018 ===
In January 2018, Sonnett was called up to her third consecutive January training camp with the USWNT. She then returned to the pitch for the USWNT as a substitute for Taylor Smith at left-back in the January friendly against Denmark, earning her 13th cap for the USWNT (and making her first appearance in well over a year).

In February she attended the pre-SheBelieves Cup training camp and was ultimately named to the 23-player roster for the 2018 SheBelieves Cup for the third consecutive year. Sonnett appeared in two of the three USWNT matches in the tournament, and made her first start in over a year and played the full 90 minutes against England in the tournament's final on March 7, 2018. In April she earned two starts in a pair of friendlies against Mexico but was left off the roster for the friendlies against China in June.

Sonnett attended the USWNT July training camp and was soon after named to the roster for the 2018 Tournament of Nations. Sonnett started all three games at right-back during the Tournament of Nations and registered an assist to Alex Morgan's goal in the 26th minute against Japan. Sonnett was also named to the 20-player roster for the 2018 CONCACAF Women's Championship in September. She appeared in three of the five match-ups during the tournament, including the game (6–0 win over Jamaica) which ultimately qualified the USWNT for the 2019 FIFA Women's World Cup. Sonnett closed out 2018 with the USWNT appearing in international friendlies against Portugal and Scotland.

=== 2019 ===
Sonnett attended the USWNT training camp in January held in Portugal and started in the friendlies versus France and Spain that same month. Sonnett was named to the 23-player roster for the 2019 SheBelieves Cup and appeared as a substitute for Kelley O'Hara in two of three matches in the tournament.

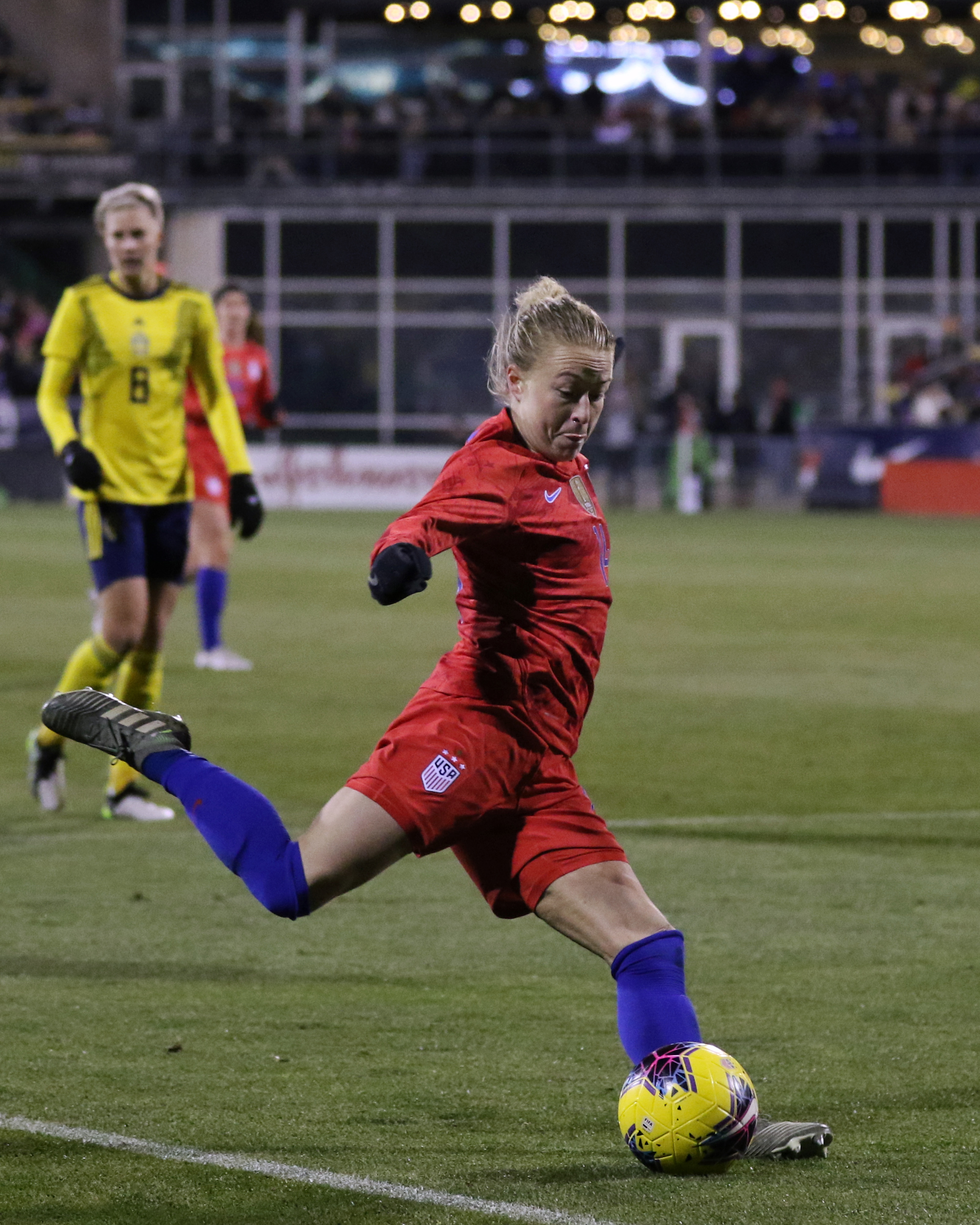
Sonnett with the USWNT in 2019

In April during the friendly against Australia, Sonnett started as right-back and registered two assists to Tobin Heath's goal in the 53rd minute and Mallory Pugh's in the 67th minute. She remained on the USWNT roster and appeared as a substitute in the World Cup send-off matches against South Africa and Mexico in May 2019.

==== 2019 FIFA Women's World Cup ====
On May 2, 2019, Sonnett was named to the 23-player roster that represented the United States at the 2019 FIFA Women's World Cup. Sonnett earned one cap in the second group stage game against Chile, entering the game at the 82nd minute to replace Abby Dahlkemper. The United States went on to defeat the Netherlands 2–0 in the final, winning back-to-back World Cup titles and the fourth overall World Cup title for the United States women's national team.

==== Post World Cup ====
Sonnett saw more playing time during the World Cup Victory Tour friendlies, appearing as right-back in four of the five match-ups and starting in three of these appearances. In November, Sonnett was called up for Vlatko Andonovski's first training camp as USWNT head coach. She played all 90 minutes as a full-back in both international friendlies against Sweden and Costa Rica.

=== 2020 ===
Sonnett attended her fifth consecutive January training camp that was held in Tampa, Florida, the first led by Andonovski. Following the January camp, she was named to the 20-player roster for the 2020 CONCACAF Women's Olympic Qualifying tournament held in late January/early February 2020. Sonnett appeared in 4 of the 5 matches during the CONCACAF tournament as right back (switching to left back with substitutions of Kelley O'Hara and Ali Krieger). The USWNT qualified for the 2020 Olympics with their win against Mexico and were named champions at the conclusion of the 2020 CONCACAF women's tournament. Sonnett was also named to the 23-player roster for the 2020 SheBelieves Cup and played all 90 minutes in the match against Spain at left back, aiding the USWNT to ultimately capture the tournament title on March 11, 2020.

Due to the COVID-19 pandemic, the USSF cancelled the USWNT's April international friendlies. The USWNT eventually returned to play in November 2020 defeating the Netherlands 2–0 in Breda, Netherlands with Sonnett playing at left back in the final minutes of the match.

=== 2021–present ===
In early January, Sonnett was called up for the annual USWNT camp that was held in Orlando. At the conclusion of camp, Sonnett appeared in both international friendlies as a full back against Colombia and registered an assist to Megan Rapinoe's goal during the January 22 match-up. In February, she was named as one of the 23 players to represent the United States during the 2021 SheBelieves Cup. Sonnett appeared in all three matches during the tournament, starting and putting in the full 90 minutes against Brazil as right back. During the final match of the tournament against Argentina, Sonnett was subbed in at the 32 minute mark for O'Hara and played in the right back, left back, and center back positions. The USWNT went undefeated during the tournament and secured their fourth SheBelieves Cup championship title with a 6–0 win over Argentina.

In the 2022 CONCACAF W Championship tournament in Monterrey, Sonnett scored her first career international goal on her 69th cap in a 3–0 semi-final win against Costa Rica.

==== 2020 Olympics ====
In late March 2020, the International Olympic Committee (IOC) and the Tokyo Metropolitan Government postponed the 2020 Summer Olympics until the summer of 2021 due to the COVID-19 pandemic.

In June 2021, Sonnett was named to the 18-player roster by Andonovski for the 2020 Summer Olympics in Tokyo, Japan. On July 24, 2021, Sonnett made her Olympic debut in a group stage match against New Zealand, playing the full 90 minutes and resulting in a 6–1 win. Sonnett also appeared in the final minutes of the bronze medal match on against Australia as a substitute for Christen Press. The USWNT defeated the Matildas 4–3, earning the team's first Olympic bronze medal.

==== 2024 Olympics ====
Sonnett was selected to the 18-player roster for the 2024 Summer Olympics in France. She started two games at center back in place of Tierna Davidson, getting wins against Australia and Japan. She appeared as a substitute in the gold medal game against Brazil, which the United States won 1–0 on a goal from Mallory Swanson.

== Personal life ==
Sonnett, Lindsey Horan, and Caitlin Foord (her former Portland Thorns FC teammates) have matching tattoos.

Sonnett is close friends with current and former teammates Rose Lavelle and Sam Mewis, as noted in multiple podcasts and media appearances.

Sonnett has a pet dog named Bagel.

== Career statistics ==
=== Club ===
As of November 10, 2024

Club	Division	Season	League		National Cup (Note: Includes Svenska Cupen and NWSL Challenge Cups)		Playoffs (Note: Includes NWSL Playoffs and W-League playoffs)		Continental (Note: Includes UEFA Champions League, NWSL x Liga MX Femenil Summer Cup, and CONCACAF W Champions Cup)		Total	
Club	Division	Season	Apps	Goals	Apps	Goals	Apps	Goals	Apps	Goals	Apps	Goals
Portland Thorns	NWSL	2016	15	0	—		1	1	—		16	1
Portland Thorns	NWSL	2017	24	3	—		2	1	—		26	4
Portland Thorns	NWSL	2018	20	1	—		2	0	—		22	1
Portland Thorns	NWSL	2019	13	2	—		1	0	—		14	2
Portland Thorns	Total		72	6	0	0	6	2	0	0	78	8
Sydney FC (loan)	W-League	2017–18	9	1	—		2	0	—		11	1
Orlando Pride	NWSL	2020	—		—		—		—		0	0
Kopparbergs/Göteborg FC	Damallsvenskan	2020	10	0	1	0	—		0	0	11	0
Washington Spirit	NWSL	2021	15	0	2	0	3	0	—		20	0
Washington Spirit	NWSL	2022	10	0	5	0	—		—		15	0
Washington Spirit	Total		25	0	1	0	1	0	3	0	30	0
OL Reign	NWSL	2023	19	0	3	0	3	0	—		25	0
Gotham FC	NWSL	2024	25	0	1	0	2	0	3	0	30	0
Gotham FC	NWSL	2025	26	0	0	0	3	0	5	0	34	0
Gotham FC	Total		51	0	1	0	1	0	3	0	30	0
Career total			186	7	12	0	15	2	3	0	224	9

=== International ===
As of match played June 9, 2026

National Team	Year	Apps	Goals
United States
United States	2015	4	0
United States	2016	8	0
United States	2017	0	0
United States	2018	14	0
United States	2019	14	0
United States	2020	6	0
United States	2021	17	0
United States	2022	6	1
United States	2023	14	1
United States	2024	20	0
United States	2025	10	0
United States	2026	5	0
Total		118	2

==== International goals ====
Scores and results list United States's goal tally first, score column indicates score after each Sonnett goal.

List of international goals scored by Emily Sonnett
No.	Date	Venue	Opponent	Score	Result	Competition	Ref.
1	July 14, 2022	San Nicolás de los Garza, Mexico	Costa Rica	1–0	3–0	2022 CONCACAF W Championship	
2	September 24, 2023	Chicago, Illinois, USA	South Africa	2–0	2–0	Friendly	

== Honors and awards ==
Portland Thorns FC

- NWSL Championship: 2017
- NWSL Shield: 2016

Kopparbergs/Göteborg FC

- Damallsvenskan: 2020

Washington Spirit

- NWSL Championship: 2021

Gotham FC

- NWSL Championship: 2025
- NWSL Shield: 2026
- NWSL Challenge Cup: 2026
- CONCACAF W Champions Cup: 2024–25
- FIFA Women's Champions Cup Bronze Medal: 2026

United States

- FIFA Women's World Cup: 2019
- Summer Olympic Games Gold Medal: 2024
- Summer Olympic Games Bronze Medal: 2020
- CONCACAF Women's Championship: 2018; 2022
- CONCACAF W Gold Cup: 2024
- CONCACAF Women's Olympic Qualifying Tournament: 2016; 2020
- SheBelieves Cup: 2016; 2018; 2020, 2021; 2022; 2023, 2024,2026
- Tournament of Nations: 2018
- 100 international appearances: 2024

Individual

- NWSL Best XI: 2018
- NWSL Second XI: 2019, 2025
- Most SheBelieves Cup wins of any player
- MAC Hermann Trophy Finalist: 2015
- Atlantic Coast Conference (ACC) Defensive Player of the Year: 2015
- ESPNW Soccer Player of the Year: 2015
- Honda Sports Award Nominee: 2015
- NSCAA First Team All-American: 2015
- College Cup Most Outstanding Defensive Player: 2014
- Second Team All-ACC: 2014
- First Team All-ACC: 2013; 2015
- Second Team TopDrawerSoccer.com Best XI: 2013; 2014
- ACC All-Tournament Team: 2012; 2014
- ACC All-Freshman Team: 2012
