= Casandra Montero =

Mexican footballer (born 1994)

Personal information
- Full name: Casandra Montero Rodríguez
- Date of birth: 31 May 1994 (age 32)
- Place of birth: La Antigua, Veracruz
- Height: 1.71 m (5 ft 7 in)
- Position: Defensive midfielder

Team information
- Current team: UNAM
- Number: 31

Youth career
- –2017: Orizaba Real Tamuin

Senior career*
| Years | Team | Apps | (Gls) |
| 2019 | Veracruz | 15 | (3) |
| 2020–2021 | Mazatlán | 34 | (4) |
| 2021–2026 | Guadalajara | 140 | (9) |
| 2026– | UNAM | 0 | (0) |

International career^{‡}
| 2013 | Mexico U-20 | | |
| 2022– | Mexico | 1 | (1) |
- * Club domestic league appearances and goals as of 31 January 2026 ‡ National team caps and goals as of 17 April 2022

Casandra Montero Rodríguez (born 31 May 1994) is a Mexican footballer who plays as a midfielder for Liga MX Femenil team UNAM and the Mexico women's national football team.

== Early career ==
Montero played for amateur football team Orizaba Real Tamuin. In 2017, she captained the team and scored 41 goals in the regional women's football tournament. She later joined the team's technical staff.

Montero also played rugby in her youth. She was a member of Tepetlan Rugby Club in Córdoba. In 2015, she represented Mexico in the Women's Sevens Series in Dublin.

== Club career ==
=== C.D. Veracruz ===
In July 2019, Montero made her professional debut for Liga MX Femenil team C.D. Veracruz.

=== Mazatlán F.C. ===
In December 2019, Montero joined Monarcas Morelia. She stayed with the team following their relocation and rebrand as Mazatlán F.C.

=== C.D. Guadalajara ===
In June 2021, Montero signed with C.D. Guadalajara.

== International career ==
In 2013, Montero was called up to the Mexico women's national under-20 football team.

In April 2022, Montero scored in her debut for Mexico in a 11–0 win over Anguilla.
