= Football at the 2024 Summer Olympics – Women's qualification (CONCACAF play-off) =

2024 Women's Olympic Football Tournament qualification (CONCACAF play-off)
- Event: Football at the 2024 Summer Olympics – Women's qualification
Jamaica	Canada
1	4
- on aggregate

First leg
Jamaica	Canada
0	2
- Date: 22 September 2023
- Venue: National Stadium, Kingston
- Referee: Katja Koroleva (United States)
- Attendance: 9,000

Second leg
Canada	Jamaica
2	1
- Date: 26 September 2023
- Venue: BMO Field, Toronto
- Referee: Katia Itzel García (Mexico)
- Attendance: 29,212

The CONCACAF play-off of the 2024 Women's Olympic Football Tournament qualification competition decided the second CONCACAF spot for the 2024 Summer Olympics women's football tournament in France. Contested over two legs in September 2023 by the teams that finished second and third in the 2022 CONCACAF W Championship, Canada defeated Jamaica in both matches to qualify for its fifth consecutive Olympics. The winner also qualified for the 2024 CONCACAF W Gold Cup.

== Qualified teams ==
CONCACAF was awarded two spots in the 2024 Women's Olympic Football Tournament by FIFA. The first spot was awarded to the winner of the 2022 CONCACAF W Championship. The teams finishing second and third in the W Championship contested the play-off for the second qualification place.

Placement	Team
2022 CONCACAF W Championship runners-up	Canada
2022 CONCACAF W Championship third place	Jamaica

== Format ==
The tie was played in a two-legged home-and-away format, with the runners-up of the W Championship, Canada, playing the second leg at home. The team that scored more goals on aggregate over the two legs qualified for the 2024 Summer Olympics, as well as the 2024 CONCACAF W Gold Cup while the loser entered qualification for the W Gold Cup. If the aggregate score was level, the away goals rule would have been applied, i.e. the team that scores more goals away from home over the two legs would qualified. If away goals were also equal, then 30 minutes of extra time would have been played, though the away goals rule would not have been applied in extra time. If the score remained level after extra time, the winners would have been decided by a penalty shoot-out.

== Summary ==
The play-off matches took place on 22 and 26 September 2023.

Team 1	Agg.	Team 2	1st leg	2nd leg
Jamaica	1–4	Canada	0–2	1–2

== Matches ==
22 September 2023
19:00 UTC-5

Jamaica	0–2	Canada
	Report	Prince 18'; Leon 90+3'

National Stadium, Kingston
Attendance: 9,000
Referee: Katja Koroleva (United States)
26 September 2023
19:00 UTC-4

Canada	2–1	Jamaica
Lacasse 40'; Huitema 50'	Report	Spence 33'

BMO Field, Toronto
Attendance: 29,212
Referee: Katia Itzel García (Mexico)
