= CONCACAF W Championship =

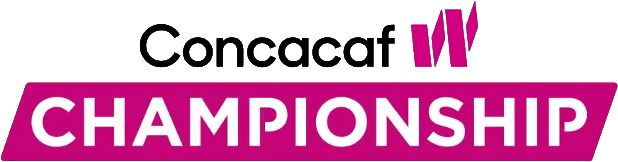
- Organizer(s): CONCACAF
- Founded: 1991; 35 years ago
- Region: North America, Central America and the Caribbean
- Teams: 8 (finals)
- Current champion: United States (9th title)
- Most championships: United States (9 titles)
- Website: CONCACAF Official
- 2026 CONCACAF W Championship

The CONCACAF W Championship (Note: Previously known as the CONCACAF Women's Championship, CONCACAF Women's Invitational Tournament, CONCACAF Women's Gold Cup and CONCACAF Women's World Cup Qualifying) is a women's association football competition for national teams organized by the Confederation of North, Central American and Caribbean Association Football (CONCACAF) that often serves as the qualifying competition to the Women's World Cup, and recently the Olympics. In years when the tournament has been held outside the World Cup qualifying cycle, non-CONCACAF members have been invited. CONCACAF is the governing body for football for North America, Central America and the Caribbean. The most successful country has been the United States, winning their ninth title in 2022.

== History ==
=== 2000 ===
Six member women's national teams participated: Canada, the U.S., Costa Rica, Guatemala, Mexico, Trinidad and Tobago, as well as two invited teams, Brazil and China. The United States hosted the tournament and were champions.

=== 2002 ===
The 2002 Women's Gold Cup was an eight-team tournament hosted by Canada and the United States. The two finalists qualified for the 2003 FIFA Women's World Cup and the third-place team qualified for the World Cup playoff. After 16 games (played as 8 doubleheaders) the United States were tournament champions, defeating Canada in overtime in the final. Mia Hamm scored the golden goal, taking the U.S. to their second Women's Gold Cup title. The U.S. had a 9–0–1 Gold Cup record, including 48 goals for and two goals against, both scored by Charmaine Hooper of Canada.

=== 2006 ===
The 2006 CONCACAF Women's Gold Cup was held in the United States, with games being hosted at The Home Depot Center in Carson, California and Tropical Park Stadium in Miami, Florida. This 2007 World Cup qualifying tournament featured six teams in single-elimination, with the top two teams qualifying directly for the 2007 FIFA Women's World Cup in China. Additionally, the third-place finisher played a two-legged home-and-away playoff against Japan (the fourth-place finisher from the Asian Confederation).

=== 2022 ===
The 2022 CONCACAF W Championship was held from 4–18 July 2022 and featured eight teams divided into two groups of four. After single round-robin play, the top two from each group qualified for the knockout rounds, played in a single match direct elimination format.

The tournament served as a CONCACAF qualifier to the 2023 FIFA Women's World Cup in Australia and New Zealand, the football tournament at the 2024 Summer Olympics in France, and the 2024 CONCACAF W Gold Cup. The top two teams of each round-robin group qualified for the World Cup, while the third-placed teams from each group advanced to the inter-confederation play-offs. The winner of the tournament also qualified for the 2024 Olympics and the 2024 CONCACAF W Gold Cup, while the second and third-placed teams advanced to a CONCACAF Olympic play-off. The winner of that play-off will also guarantee their place at the 2024 Olympics and the 2024 W Gold Cup.

== Results ==
| Year | Host | Final | | | Third place play-off | | |
| Year | Host | Champion | Score | Runner-up | 3rd place | Score | 4th place |
CONCACAF Women's Championship
| 1991; Details | Haiti | United States | 5–0 | Canada | Trinidad and Tobago | 4–2 | Haiti |
CONCACAF Women's Invitational Tournament
| 1993 (Note: Tournament was not used as FIFA Women's World Cup qualification); Details | United States | United States | Round-robin | New Zealand | Canada | Round-robin | Trinidad and Tobago |
CONCACAF Women's Championship
| 1994; Details | Canada | United States | Round-robin | Canada | Mexico | Round-robin | Trinidad and Tobago |
| 1998 (Note: The United States did not participate, as they qualified directly for the 1999 FIFA Women's World Cup as the host); Details | Canada | Canada | 1–0 | Mexico | Costa Rica | 4–0 | Guatemala |
CONCACAF Women's Gold Cup
| 2000; Details | United States | United States | 1–0 | Brazil | China | 2–1 | Canada |
| 2002; Details | Canada; United States | United States | 2–1 (gg) | Canada | Mexico | 4–1 | Costa Rica |
| 2006; Details | United States | United States | 2–1 (a.e.t.) | Canada | Mexico | 3–0 | Jamaica |
CONCACAF Women's World Cup Qualifying
| 2010; Details | Mexico | Canada | 1–0 | Mexico | United States | 3–0 | Costa Rica |
CONCACAF Women's Championship
| 2014 (Note: Canada did not participate, as they qualified directly for the 2015 FIFA Women's World Cup as the host); Details | United States | United States | 6–0 | Costa Rica | Mexico | 4–2 (a.e.t.) | Trinidad and Tobago |
| 2018; Details | United States | United States | 2–0 | Canada | Jamaica | 2–2 (a.e.t.); 4–2 (p) | Panama |
CONCACAF W Championship
| 2022; Details | Mexico | United States | 1–0 | Canada | Jamaica | 1–0 (a.e.t.) | Costa Rica |
| 2026; Details | United States | | | | | | |

== Performance by country ==
| Team | Champions | Runners-up | Third place | Fourth place |
|---|---|---|---|---|
| United States | 9 (1991, 1993, 1994, 2000, 2002, 2006, 2014, 2018, 2022) | – | 1 (2010) | – |
| Canada | 2 (1998, 2010) | 6 (1991, 1994, 2002, 2006, 2018, 2022) | 1 (1993) | 1 (2000) |
| Mexico | – | 2 (1998, 2010) | 4 (1994, 2002, 2006, 2014) | – |
| Costa Rica | – | 1 (2014) | 1 (1998) | 3 (2002, 2010, 2022) |
| Brazil (Note: Guest nation (non-CONCACAF invitees)) | – | 1 (2000) | – | – |
| New Zealand | – | 1 (1993) | – | – |
| Jamaica | – | – | 2 (2018, 2022) | 1 (2006) |
| Trinidad and Tobago | – | – | 1 (1991) | 3 (1993, 1994, 2014) |
| China | – | – | 1 (2000) | – |
| Haiti | – | – | – | 1 (1991) |
| Guatemala | – | – | – | 1 (1998) |
| Panama | – | – | | 1 (2018) |

== Overall team records ==
In this ranking 3 points are awarded for a win, 1 for a draw and 0 for a loss. As per statistical convention in football, matches decided in extra time are counted as wins and losses, while matches decided by penalty shoot-outs are counted as draws. Teams are ranked by total points, then by goal difference, then by goals scored.

As of 2022 CONCACAF Women's Championship

| Rank | Team | Part | Pld | W | D | L | GF | GA | Dif | Pts |
|---|---|---|---|---|---|---|---|---|---|---|
| 1 | United States | 10 | 44 | 42 | 1 | 1 | 212 | 6 | +206 | 127 |
| 2 | Canada | 10 | 44 | 33 | 1 | 10 | 191 | 33 | +158 | 100 |
| 3 | Mexico | 10 | 39 | 18 | 2 | 19 | 94 | 85 | +9 | 56 |
| 4 | Costa Rica | 8 | 34 | 15 | 1 | 18 | 53 | 80 | −27 | 46 |
| 5 | Trinidad and Tobago | 11 | 40 | 13 | 2 | 25 | 44 | 138 | −94 | 41 |
| 6 | Jamaica | 7 | 25 | 7 | 1 | 16 | 32 | 77 | −45 | 22 |
| 7 | Haiti | 6 | 20 | 6 | 0 | 14 | 18 | 66 | −48 | 18 |
| 8 | Panama | 4 | 12 | 4 | 1 | 7 | 13 | 36 | −23 | 13 |
| 9 | China | 1 | 5 | 4 | 0 | 1 | 24 | 6 | +18 | 12 |
| 10 | Brazil | 1 | 5 | 3 | 1 | 1 | 22 | 3 | +19 | 10 |
| 11 | Guatemala | 4 | 14 | 2 | 0 | 12 | 11 | 68 | −57 | 6 |
| 12 | New Zealand | 1 | 3 | 1 | 1 | 1 | 7 | 3 | +4 | 4 |
| 13 | Martinique | 3 | 9 | 0 | 2 | 7 | 12 | 59 | −47 | 2 |
| 14 | Guyana | 1 | 3 | 0 | 0 | 3 | 3 | 19 | −16 | 0 |
| 15 | Cuba | 1 | 3 | 0 | 0 | 3 | 0 | 29 | –29 | 0 |
| 16 | Puerto Rico | 1 | 3 | 0 | 0 | 3 | 0 | 38 | −38 | 0 |

== Comprehensive team results by tournament ==
Legend

- 1st – Champions
- 2nd – Runners-up
- 3rd – Third place
- 4th – Fourth place
- GS – Group stage
- Q – Qualified for upcoming tournament
- • – Did not qualify
- † – Disqualified
- × – Did not enter / Withdrew / Banned
- – Hosts

| Team | (Haiti) 1991 (8) | (United States) 1993 (4) | (Canada) 1994 (5) | (Canada) 1998 (8) | (United States) 2000 (8) | (Canada) (United States) 2002 (8) | (United States) 2006 (6) | (Mexico) 2010 (8) | (United States) 2014 (8) | (United States) 2018 (8) | (Mexico) 2022 (8) | (United States) 2026 (8) | Total |
|---|---|---|---|---|---|---|---|---|---|---|---|---|---|
| Canada | 2nd | 3rd | 2nd | 1st | 4th | 2nd | 2nd | 1st | × | 2nd | 2nd | Q | 11 |
| Costa Rica | GS | × | × | 3rd | GS | 4th | • | 4th | 2nd | GS | 4th | Q | 9 |
| Cuba | × | × | × | × | × | × | × | • | • | GS | • | • | 1 |
| El Salvador | × | × | × | • | × | • | • | • | • | • | • | Q | 1 |
| Guatemala | × | × | × | 4th | GS | — | — | GS | GS | † | — | — | 4 |
| Guyana | — | — | — | • | × | × | × | GS | × | • | • | • | 1 |
| Haiti | 4th | × | × | GS | × | GS | • | GS | GS | • | GS | Q | 7 |
| Jamaica | GS | × | 5th | × | × | GS | 4th | × | GS | 3rd | 3rd | Q | 8 |
| Martinique | GS | × | × | GS | × | × | × | × | GS | • | × | × | 3 |
| Mexico | GS | × | 3rd | 2nd | GS | 3rd | 3rd | 2nd | 3rd | GS | GS | Q | 11 |
| Panama | × | × | × | × | × | GS | GS | × | • | 4th | GS | Q | 5 |
| Puerto Rico | × | × | × | GS | × | • | × | • | • | • | • | • | 1 |
| Trinidad and Tobago | 3rd | 4th | 4th | GS | GS | GS | GS | GS | 4th | GS | GS | • | 11 |
| United States | 1st | 1st | 1st | — | 1st | 1st | 1st | 3rd | 1st | 1st | 1st | Q | 11 |
Non-CONCACAF Invitees
| Brazil | — | — | — | — | 2nd | — | — | — | — | — | — | — | 1 |
| China | — | — | — | — | 3rd | — | — | — | — | — | — | — | 1 |
| New Zealand | — | 2nd | — | — | — | — | — | — | — | — | — | — | 1 |
| Total | 8 | 4 | 5 | 8 | 8 | 8 | 6 | 8 | 8 | 8 | 8 | 8 | 8 |

== Awards ==
| Year | Best Player | Top Scorer | Goals | Best goalkeeper | Best Young Player | Fair Play Award |
|---|---|---|---|---|---|---|
| 1991 | | | | | | |
| 1993 | | | | | | |
| 1994 | | | | | | |
| 1998 | (Canada) Silvana Burtini | (Canada) Silvana Burtini | 14 | | | |
| 2000 | | (Brazil) Kátia | 8 | | | |
| 2002 | (United States) Tiffeny Milbrett | (Canada) Charmaine Hooper (Canada) Christine Sinclair (United States) Tiffeny Milbrett | 7 | (Mexico) Jennifer Molina | | |
| 2006 | (United States) Kristine Lilly | (Mexico) Maribel Domínguez (Mexico) Mónica Ocampo (Canada) Christine Sinclair (United States) Abby Wambach | 2 | (Canada) Erin McLeod | | |
| 2010 | | (United States) Abby Wambach | 8 | | | |
| 2014 | (United States) Carli Lloyd | (United States) Abby Wambach | 7 | (United States) Hope Solo | | Costa Rica |
| 2018 | (United States) Julie Ertz | (United States) Alex Morgan | 7 | (Panama) Yenith Bailey | (Jamaica) Jody Brown | United States |
| 2022 | (United States) Alex Morgan | (Canada) Jessie Fleming (Canada) Julia Grosso (Note: Grosso was awarded the Golden Boot based on having played the fewest minutes of the four players to score three goals.) (Jamaica) Khadija Shaw (United States) Alex Morgan | 3 | (Canada) Kailen Sheridan | (Haiti) Melchie Dumornay | Canada |

== Hat-tricks ==
| Player | Year | Score | Details |
|---|---|---|---|
| (Canada) Christine Sinclair | 2000 | Canada 12–0 Guatemala | Sinclair scored a hat-trick or more at matches in three different editions, before the competition became the CONCACAF Women's Championship. |
| (Canada) Christine Sinclair | 2002 | Canada 11–1 Haiti | Sinclair scored a hat-trick or more at matches in three different editions, before the competition became the CONCACAF Women's Championship. |
| (Canada) Christine Sinclair | 2010 | Canada 8–0 Guyana | Sinclair scored a hat-trick or more at matches in three different editions, before the competition became the CONCACAF Women's Championship. |

== Winning coaches ==
| Year | Team | Coach |
|---|---|---|
| 1991 | United States | (United States) Anson Dorrance |
| 1993 | United States | (United States) Anson Dorrance |
| 1994 | United States | (United States) Tony DiCicco |
| 1998 | Canada | (Canada) Neil Turnbull |
| 2000 | United States | (United States) April Heinrichs |
| 2002 | United States | (United States) April Heinrichs |
| 2006 | United States | (United States) Greg Ryan |
| 2010 | Canada | (Italy) Carolina Morace |
| 2014 | United States | (United States) Jill Ellis |
| 2018 | United States | (United States) Jill Ellis |
| 2022 | United States | (North Macedonia) Vlatko Andonovski |

== See also ==
- CONCACAF W Gold Cup
- CONCACAF Gold Cup
- CONCACAF Championship
