= 2022 CONCACAF W Championship =

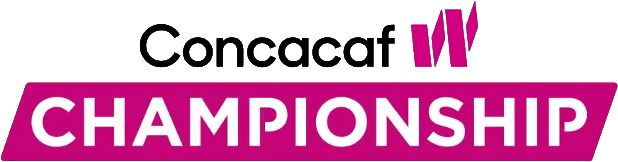

Tournament details
- Host country: Mexico
- Dates: 4–18 July
- Teams: 8 (from 1 confederation)
- Venues: 2 (in 2 host cities)

Final positions
- Champions: United States (9th title)
- Runners-up: Canada
- Third place: Jamaica
- Fourth place: Costa Rica

Tournament statistics
- Matches played: 16
- Goals scored: 42 (2.63 per match)
- Attendance: 94,028 (5,877 per match)
- Top scorer(s): (Canada) Jessie Fleming (Canada) Julia Grosso (Note: Grosso was awarded the Golden Boot based on having played the fewest minutes of the four players to score three goals.) (Jamaica) Khadija Shaw (United States) Alex Morgan (3 goals each)
- Best player: (United States) Alex Morgan
- Best young player: (Haiti) Melchie Dumornay
- Best goalkeeper: (Canada) Kailen Sheridan
- Fair play award: Canada

The 2022 CONCACAF W Championship was the 11th edition of the CONCACAF W Championship, the quadrennial international women's football championship contested by the senior women's national teams of the member associations of CONCACAF, the regional governing body of North America, Central America, and the Caribbean. Eight teams played in the tournament, which took place from 4 to 18 July 2022 in Mexico. The United States emerged as the winner, defeating Canada 1–0 in the final.

The tournament served as the CONCACAF qualifiers to the 2023 FIFA Women's World Cup in Australia and New Zealand, as well as for the football tournaments at the 2024 Summer Olympics in France and the 2023 Pan American Games in Chile. The top two teams in each of the two groups qualified for the Women's World Cup, while the third-placed teams from each group advanced to the inter-confederation play-offs. The winner qualified for the 2024 Summer Olympics and the 2024 CONCACAF W Gold Cup, while the second and third-placed teams advanced to the CONCACAF Olympic play-off. Finally, the champions and the best team from each of the three CONCACAF sub-regions qualified for the 2023 Pan American Games.

The United States were the two-time defending champions, having won the 2014 and 2018 tournaments.

== Qualification ==
The qualifying competition was held in February and April 2022. For six of the available eight slots, thirty teams were drawn into six groups of five, and played two home and two away matches in a single round-robin format. The six group winners advanced to the CONCACAF W Championship. In addition, Canada and the United States, the two highest-ranked CONCACAF teams in the FIFA Women's World Rankings of August 2020, qualified automatically.

=== Qualified teams ===
The following teams qualified for the CONCACAF W Championship.

Team	Method of qualification	Date of qualification	Finals appearance	Previous best performance	Previous World Cup appearances	FIFA ranking at start of event
Canada	Automatic	10 December 2020	10th	Champions (1998, 2010)	7	6
United States (title holders)	Automatic	10 December 2020	10th	Champions (1991, 1993, 1994, 2000, 2002, 2006, 2014, 2018)	8	1
Mexico (hosts)	Qualification Group A winner	12 April 2022	10th	Runners-up (1998, 2010)	3	26
Costa Rica	Qualification Group B winner	12 April 2022	8th	Runners-up (2014)	1	37
Jamaica	Qualification Group C winner	12 April 2022	7th	Third place (2018)	1	51
Panama	Qualification Group D winner	12 April 2022	4th	Fourth place (2018)	0	57
Haiti	Qualification Group E winner	12 April 2022	6th	Fourth place (1991)	0	60
Trinidad and Tobago	Qualification Group F winner	12 April 2022	11th	Third place (1991)	0	76

== Venues ==
On 14 February 2022, CONCACAF announced that the tournament would be held in Mexico and that matches would be played in the cities of Guadalupe and San Nicolás de los Garza, both located in the Monterrey metropolitan area, within the state of Nuevo León.

For commercial reasons, Estadio BBVA changed its name to "Estadio del Club de Fútbol Monterrey" during the tournament.

San Nicolás de los Garza	Guadalupe	Location of the host cities of the 2022 CONCACAF W Championship.
(Monterrey Area)		Location of the host cities of the 2022 CONCACAF W Championship.
Estadio Universitario	Estadio BBVA	Location of the host cities of the 2022 CONCACAF W Championship.
Capacity: 41,615	Capacity: 53,500	Location of the host cities of the 2022 CONCACAF W Championship.

== Format ==
Eight teams played in the tournament, drawn into two groups of four teams and played single round-robin matches. The top two teams of each group advanced to the knockout stage, and qualified for the 2023 FIFA Women's World Cup. The two third-placed teams from the group stage advanced to the inter-confederation play-offs. The number of slots is an expansion from the previous Women's World Cup qualifying competition, which allocated only 3.5 spots to CONCACAF.

The knockout stage featured the semi-finals, a third place match, and the final to determine the champions. The winners of the competition qualified for the football tournament at the 2024 Summer Olympics in France, while the second and third-placed teams advanced to the CONCACAF Olympic play-off.

=== Tiebreakers ===
Teams were ranked according to points (3 points for a win, 1 point for a draw, 0 points for a loss). The rankings of teams in each group were determined as follows (regulations Articles 12.3):

1. points obtained in all group matches;
2. goal difference in all group matches;
3. number of goals scored in all group matches;

If two or more teams are equal on the basis of the above three criteria, their rankings are determined as follows:

4. points obtained in the group matches between the teams concerned;
5. goal difference in the group matches between the teams concerned;
6. number of goals scored in the group matches between the teams concerned;
7. lowest fair play points in all group matches:
  - first yellow card: minus 1 point;
  - indirect red card (second yellow card): minus 3 points;
  - direct red card: minus 4 points;
  - yellow card and direct red card: minus 5 points;
8. drawing of lots by CONCACAF.

== Draw ==
The group stage draw was held on 19 April 2022, 19:00 EDT (UTC−4), in Miami, Florida, United States. The eight teams were split into four pots of two teams each, based on the FIFA Women's World Rankings of June 2021. The highest-ranked nation, the United States, was automatically placed in position 1 of Group A, while the second highest-ranked nation, Canada, was placed in position 1 of Group B. The remaining teams were drawn into Group A and B in order, taking the position corresponding to their pot.

Pot 1	Pot 2	Pot 3	Pot 4
United States (1) (position A1); Canada (8) (position B1)	Mexico (28); Costa Rica (36)	Jamaica (51); Panama (60)	Haiti (62); Trinidad and Tobago (70)

== Squads ==
Each national team had to submit a preliminary list of up to 60 players, 5 of whom must be goalkeepers, at least thirty days before the opening match of the tournament. Using players only from this list, each team must submit a final squad of 23 players, 3 of whom must be goalkeepers, at least ten days before the opening match of the tournament. If a player became injured or ill severely enough to prevent their participation in the tournament before their team's first match, or following the completion of the group stage, they could be replaced by another player from the preliminary list.

== Match officials ==
On 21 June 2022, CONCACAF announced the list of match officials for the tournament.

Referees

- (Canada) Marie-Soleil Beaudoin
- (Canada) Myriam Marcotte
- (Costa Rica) Marianela Araya
- (Guatemala) Astrid Gramajo
- (Honduras) Melissa Borjas
- (Jamaica) Odette Hamilton
- (Mexico) Katia García
- (Mexico) Francia González
- (Nicaragua) Tatiana Guzmán
- (United States) Ekaterina Koroleva
- (United States) Tori Penso

Assistant referees

- (Canada) Chantal Boudreau
- (Cuba) Ivett Santiago
- (El Salvador) Lidia Ayala
- (Guatemala) Iris Vail
- (Honduras) Lourdes Noriega
- (Honduras) Shirley Perelló
- (Jamaica) Jassett Kerr
- (Jamaica) Stephanie-Dale Yee Sing
- (Mexico) Enedina Caudillo
- (Mexico) Mayte Chávez
- (Mexico) Karen Díaz
- (Mexico) Sandra Ramírez
- (Suriname) Mijensa Rensch
- (United States) Felisha Mariscal
- (United States) Brooke Mayo
- (United States) Kathryn Nesbitt

Video assistant referees

- (Canada) Chantal Boudreau
- (Canada) Carol Anne Chenard
- (Costa Rica) Marianela Araya
- (Honduras) Melissa Borjas
- (Honduras) Shirley Perelló
- (Jamaica) Odette Hamilton
- (Jamaica) Stephanie-Dale Yee Sing
- (Mexico) Enedina Caudillo
- (Mexico) Mayte Chávez
- (Mexico) Karen Díaz
- (Mexico) Francia González
- (Mexico) Sandra Ramírez
- (Nicaragua) Tatiana Guzmán
- (United States) Ekaterina Koroleva
- (United States) Felisha Mariscal
- (United States) Brooke Mayo
- (United States) Kathryn Nesbitt
- (United States) Tori Penso

== Group stage ==
The tournament schedule, without kick-off times, was announced on 20 April 2022, the day following the draw.

The top two teams of each group qualified for the 2023 FIFA Women's World Cup in Australia and New Zealand. The third-placed teams in each group advanced to the inter-confederation play-offs.

All times are local, CDT (UTC−5).

=== Group A ===
Pos	Team	Pld	W	D	L	GF	GA	GD	Pts	Qualification
1	United States	3	3	0	0	9	0	+9	9	Qualification for Women's World Cup and advance to knockout stage
2	Jamaica	3	2	0	1	5	5	0	6	Qualification for Women's World Cup and advance to knockout stage
3	Haiti	3	1	0	2	3	7	−4	3	Advance to inter-confederation play-offs
4	Mexico (H)	3	0	0	3	0	5	−5	0	

Source: CONCACAF
Rules for classification: Tiebreakers
(H) Hosts
4 July 2022
18:00

United States	3–0	Haiti
Morgan 16', 23'; Purce 84'	Report (FIFA); Report (CONCACAF)

Estadio Universitario, San Nicolás de los Garza
Attendance: 5,345
Referee: Marie-Soleil Beaudoin (Canada)
4 July 2022
21:00

Mexico	0–1	Jamaica
	Report (FIFA); Report (CONCACAF)	Shaw 8'

Estadio Universitario, San Nicolás de los Garza
Attendance: 5,291
Referee: Tatiana Guzmán (Nicaragua)

7 July 2022
18:00

Jamaica	0–5	United States
	Report (FIFA); Report (CONCACAF)	Smith 5', 8'; Lavelle 59'; Mewis 83' (pen.); Rodman 86'

Estadio BBVA, Guadalupe
Attendance: 3,150
Referee: Melissa Borjas (Honduras)
7 July 2022
21:00

Haiti	3–0	Mexico
Borgella 14' (pen.); Mondésir 67' (pen.); Jeudy 78'	Report (FIFA); Report (CONCACAF)

Estadio BBVA, Guadalupe
Attendance: 3,375
Referee: Marianela Araya (Costa Rica)

11 July 2022
21:00

Jamaica	4–0	Haiti
Carter 26'; Shaw 58', 70' (pen.); Spence 79'	Report (FIFA); Report (CONCACAF)

Estadio BBVA, Guadalupe
Attendance: 4,356
Referee: Ekaterina Koroleva (United States)
11 July 2022
21:00

United States	1–0	Mexico
Mewis 89'	Report (FIFA); Report (CONCACAF)

Estadio Universitario, San Nicolás de los Garza
Attendance: 20,522
Referee: Myriam Marcotte (Canada)

=== Group B ===
Pos	Team	Pld	W	D	L	GF	GA	GD	Pts	Qualification
1	Canada	3	3	0	0	9	0	+9	9	Qualification for Women's World Cup and advance to knockout stage
2	Costa Rica	3	2	0	1	7	2	+5	6	Qualification for Women's World Cup and advance to knockout stage
3	Panama	3	1	0	2	1	4	−3	3	Advance to inter-confederation play-offs
4	Trinidad and Tobago	3	0	0	3	0	11	−11	0	

Source: CONCACAF
Rules for classification: Tiebreakers
5 July 2022
18:00

Costa Rica	3–0	Panama
R. Rodríguez 6'; Salas 24'; Alvarado 60' (pen.)	Report (FIFA); Report (CONCACAF)

Estadio BBVA, Guadalupe
Attendance: 4,327
Referee: Odette Hamilton (Jamaica)
5 July 2022
21:00

Canada	6−0	Trinidad and Tobago
Sinclair 27'; Grosso 67', 79'; Fleming 84'; Beckie 86'; Huitema 90+1'	Report (FIFA); Report (CONCACAF)

Estadio BBVA, Guadalupe
Attendance: 3,872
Referee: Katia García (Mexico)

8 July 2022
18:00

Trinidad and Tobago	0–4	Costa Rica
	Report (FIFA); Report (CONCACAF)	Granados 18', 44'; Hutchinson 33' (o.g.); Alvarado 48'

Estadio Universitario, San Nicolás de los Garza
Attendance: 3,025
Referee: Francia González (Mexico)
8 July 2022
21:00

Panama	0–1	Canada
	Report (FIFA); Report (CONCACAF)	Grosso 64'

Estadio Universitario, San Nicolás de los Garza
Attendance: 3,249
Referee: Tori Penso (United States)

11 July 2022
18:00

Canada	2–0	Costa Rica
Fleming 5'; Schmidt 69'	Report (FIFA); Report (CONCACAF)

Estadio BBVA, Guadalupe
Attendance: 3,721
Referee: Odette Hamilton (Jamaica)
11 July 2022
18:00

Panama	1–0	Trinidad and Tobago
Cox 43'	Report (FIFA); Report (CONCACAF)

Estadio Universitario, San Nicolás de los Garza
Attendance: 3,969
Referee: Astrid Gramajo (Guatemala)

== Knockout stage ==
In the knockout stage, if a match was level at the end of normal playing time, extra time (two periods of 15 minutes each) was played and followed, if necessary, by a penalty shoot-out to determine the winners.

=== Bracket ===
Semi-finals
14 July – San Nicolás de los Garza
United States	3
Costa Rica	0
14 July – San Nicolás de los Garza
Canada	3
Jamaica	0

Final
18 July – Guadalupe
United States	1
Canada	0
Third place match
18 July – Guadalupe
Costa Rica	0
Jamaica (a.e.t.)	1

=== Semi-finals ===
14 July 2022
18:00

United States	3–0	Costa Rica
Sonnett 34'; Pugh 45+3'; Sanchez 90+5'	Report (FIFA); Report (CONCACAF)

Estadio Universitario, San Nicolás de los Garza
Attendance: 2,537
Referee: Astrid Gramajo (Guatemala)

14 July 2022
21:00

Canada	3–0	Jamaica
Fleming 18'; Chapman 64'; Leon 76'	Report (FIFA); Report (CONCACAF)

Estadio Universitario, San Nicolás de los Garza
Attendance: 3,153
Referee: Melissa Borjas (Honduras)

=== Third place match ===
The winner advanced to the CONCACAF play-off for both the football tournament at the 2024 Summer Olympics in France and the 2024 CONCACAF W Gold Cup as unseeded team.

18 July 2022
18:00

Costa Rica	0–1 (a.e.t.)	Jamaica
	Report (FIFA); Report (CONCACAF)	Van Zanten 102'

Estadio BBVA, Guadalupe
Attendance: 6,889
Referee: Marie-Soleil Beaudoin (Canada)

=== Final ===
The winner qualified for the football tournament at the 2024 Summer Olympics in France and the 2024 CONCACAF W Gold Cup. The runners-up advanced to the two-legged CONCACAF playoff for both tournaments as seeded team.

18 July 2022
21:00

United States	1–0	Canada
Morgan 78' (pen.)	Report (FIFA); Report (CONCACAF)

Estadio BBVA, Guadalupe
Attendance: 17,247
Referee: Katia García (Mexico)

2022 CONCACAF W Championship winners

United States
9th title

== Goalscorers ==
There were 42 goals scored in 16 matches, for an average of 2.62 goals per match.

3 goals

- (Canada) Jessie Fleming
- (Canada) Julia Grosso
- (Jamaica) Khadija Shaw
- (United States) Alex Morgan

2 goals

- (Costa Rica) Katherine Alvarado
- (Costa Rica) Cristín Granados
- (United States) Kristie Mewis
- (United States) Sophia Smith

1 goal

- (Canada) Janine Beckie
- (Canada) Allysha Chapman
- (Canada) Jordyn Huitema
- (Canada) Adriana Leon
- (Canada) Sophie Schmidt
- (Canada) Christine Sinclair
- (Costa Rica) Raquel Rodríguez
- (Costa Rica) María Paula Salas
- (Haiti) Roselord Borgella
- (Haiti) Sherly Jeudy
- (Haiti) Nérilia Mondésir
- (Jamaica) Trudi Carter
- (Jamaica) Drew Spence
- (Jamaica) Kalyssa Van Zanten
- (Panama) Marta Cox
- (United States) Rose Lavelle
- (United States) Mallory Pugh
- (United States) Margaret Purce
- (United States) Trinity Rodman
- (United States) Ashley Sanchez
- (United States) Emily Sonnett

1 own goal

- (Trinidad and Tobago) Lauryn Hutchinson (against Costa Rica)

== Awards ==
Award	Player
Golden Ball	(United States) Alex Morgan
Golden Boot	(Canada) Julia Grosso (3 goals)
Golden Glove	(Canada) Kailen Sheridan
Young Player	(Haiti) Melchie Dumornay
Fair Play	Canada

Best XI
Goalkeeper	Defenders	Midfielders	Forwards
(Canada) Kailen Sheridan	(Canada) Vanessa Gilles; (United States) Naomi Girma; (United States) Becky Sauerbrunn	(Canada) Jessie Fleming; (Haiti) Melchie Dumornay; (Jamaica) Drew Spence; (United States) Rose Lavelle	(Canada) Julia Grosso; (Jamaica) Khadija Shaw; (United States) Alex Morgan

== Qualification for international tournaments ==
=== Qualified teams for the 2023 FIFA Women's World Cup ===
The following six teams from CONCACAF qualified for the 2023 FIFA Women's World Cup in Australia and New Zealand.

Team	Qualified on	Previous appearances in FIFA Women's World Cup^{1}
United States	7 July 2022	8 (**1991**, 1995, **1999**, 2003, 2007, 2011, **2015**, **2019**)
Costa Rica	8 July 2022	1 (2015)
Canada	8 July 2022	7 (1995, 1999, 2003, 2007, 2011, 2015, 2019)
Jamaica	11 July 2022	1 (2019)
Haiti	22 February 2023	0 (debut)
Panama	23 February 2023	0 (debut)

^{1} Bold indicates champions for that year. Italic indicates hosts for that year.

=== Qualified teams for the 2024 Summer Olympics and the 2024 CONCACAF W Gold Cup ===
The following two teams from CONCACAF qualified for the 2024 Summer Olympic Women's football tournament in France, and the 2024 CONCACAF W Gold Cup in the United States. In addition to the winner of the W Championship (United States), the winner of a CONCACAF Olympic play-off between the second and third-placed teams of the W Championship also qualified.

Team	Qualified on	Previous appearances in Summer Olympic Games^{2}
United States	18 July 2022	7 (**1996**, 2000, **2004**, **2008**, **2012**, 2016, 2020)
Canada	26 September 2023	4 (2008, 2012, 2016, **2020**)

^{2} Bold indicates champions for that year. Italic indicates hosts for that year.

=== Qualified teams for the 2023 Pan American Games ===
Similar to the 2018 championship, this tournament was used to determine the four teams from CONCACAF which qualified for the 2023 Pan American Games Women's football tournament in Chile. The champions and the top team from each of the three CONCACAF zones, i.e., Caribbean (CFU), Central American (UNCAF), and North American (NAFU), qualified. However, Canada declined to participate citing scheduling issues and was replaced by Mexico, the next NAFU best team.

Team	Zone	Qualified on	Previous appearances in Pan American Games^{3}
Costa Rica	UNCAF	8 July 2022	5 (1999, 2003, 2011, 2015, 2019)
Jamaica	CFU	11 July 2022	2 (2007, 2019)
United States	NAFU (Qualified by the champions quota)	14 July 2022	2 (**1999**, 2007)
Mexico	NAFU	12 September 2023	6 (all) (1999, 2003, 2007, 2011, 2015, 2019)

^{3} Bold indicates champions for that year. Italic indicates hosts for that year.

== Marketing ==
=== Logo ===
The official logo was unveiled on 19 August 2021.

=== Official song ===
"Lions (Champions Mix)" by Jamaican singer Skip Marley (feat. Cedella Marley) served as the official song of the tournament.

== Broadcasting rights ==
=== CONCACAF ===
Country	Broadcaster(s)	Ref.
Canada	OneSoccer; CBC	
United States	CBS; Paramount+; TUDN; ViX	
Mexico	ESPN; Star+	
Caribbean	ESPN; Star+	
Latin America	ESPN; Star+	

=== International ===
	Broadcaster	Ref
International (unsold markets)	Concacaf GO	
South America	ESPN; Star+	
