= Le Classique (women) =

Football rivalry in France

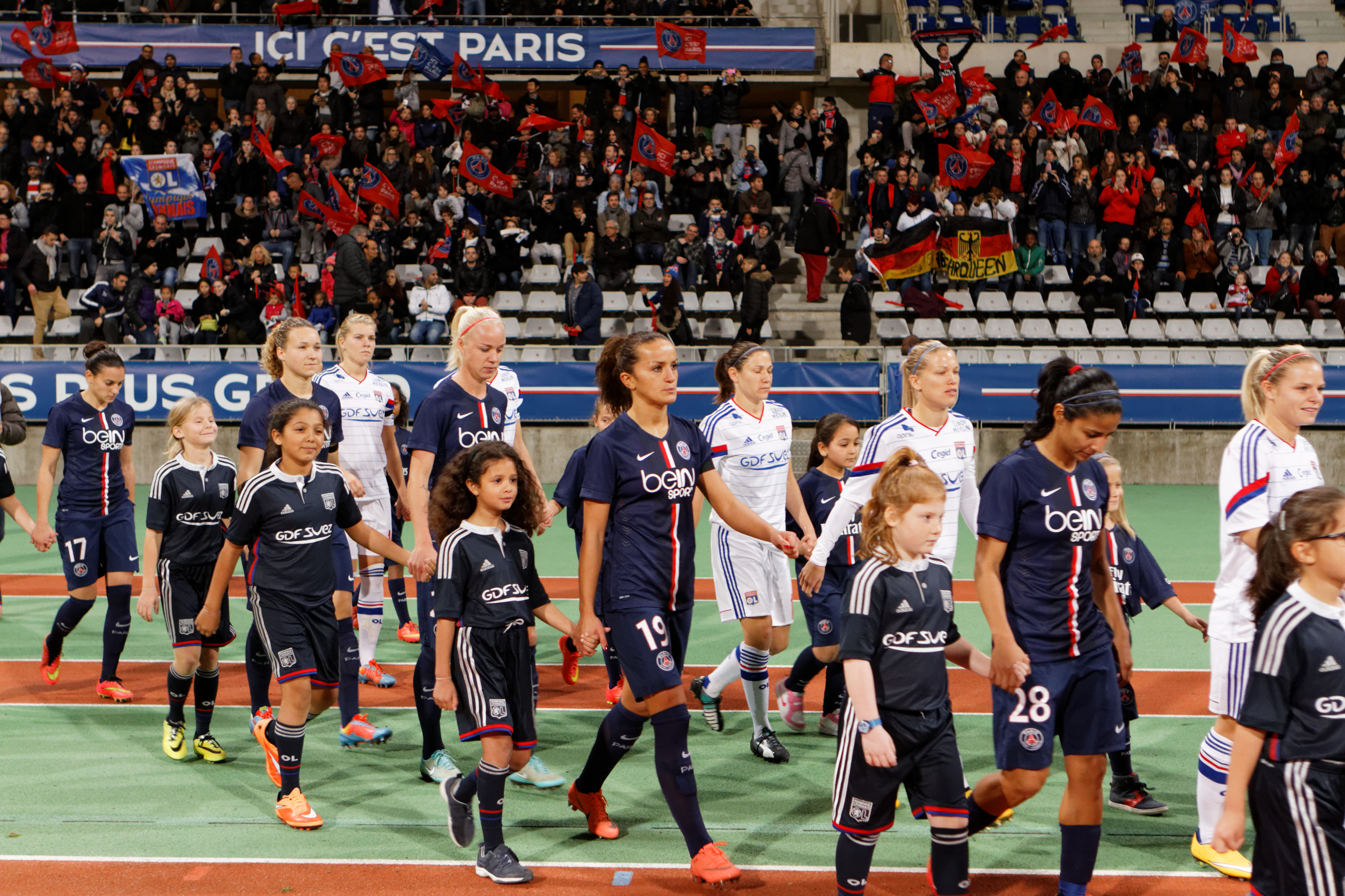
- PSG and Lyon players walk onto the pitch in 2014.
- Other names: Le Classico
- Location: France
- Teams: Paris Saint-Germain; OL Lyonnes
- First meeting: 2 October 1994; Première Ligue; Lyon 5–0 Paris Saint-Germain
- Stadiums: Parc des Princes (PSG); Parc Olympique Lyonnais (Lyon)

Statistics
- Total meetings: 80
- Most wins: Lyon (56)
- Most player appearances: Wendie Renard (59)
- Top scorer: Ada Hegerberg (14)
- All-time record: Paris Saint-Germain: 8 Draw: 16; Lyon: 56
- Largest victory: 23 April 2016; UEFA Women's Champions League; Lyon 7–0 Paris Saint-Germain

Le Classique (French pronunciation: [lə klasik], The Classic), also referred to as Le Classico, is a French football rivalry contested between Paris Saint-Germain (PSG) and OL Lyonnes (Lyon), the two most successful clubs in French women's football. First played in 1994, the fixture has grown in prominence to become one of the marquee matchups in the Première Ligue, France's top women's league. Over the years, the rivalry has featured closely contested league games, cup finals, and European encounters, drawing increased attention as both clubs have competed for national and continental honours.

By the end of the 2000s, Lyon had established overwhelming dominance in French and European women's football. PSG gradually emerged as a credible challenger in the 2010s following its acquisition by Qatar Sports Investments (QSI) in 2012. From the mid-2010s onward, the two sides regularly finished in the top two positions of the Première Ligue and faced each other repeatedly in the Coupe de France Féminine and the UEFA Women's Champions League. Although Lyon largely maintained the upper hand, PSG recorded notable milestones, including their first league victory over Lyon in 2014 and a landmark European success in 2015. Intense competition for elite players in the transfer market has further heightened tensions between two of the best-resourced clubs in women's football.

Public interest in the fixture grew steadily, leading it to be widely known as the women's Le Classique or Le Classico. A key turning point occurred in 2018, when PSG won their first trophy against Lyon by lifting the Coupe de France, symbolizing a narrowing of the competitive gap despite Lyon's continued domestic and European dominance. The rivalry intensified through a series of high-profile encounters in the 2020s, notably PSG ending Lyon's 80-match unbeaten league run and securing their first Première Ligue title in 2021. Lyon, however, retained the upper hand in decisive Champions League knockout ties and domestic finals between 2022 and 2026.

The women's rivalry mirrors the prominence of the men's Le Classique, contested between Paris Saint-Germain FC (PSG) and Olympique de Marseille (OM), which is regarded as the biggest fixture in French men's football. PSG and OM are the two most successful clubs in France and widely supported clubs in France. The rivalry emerged in the 1980s following PSG's first league title and OM's ascent under Bernard Tapie, as sustained competition for titles and a series of off-field controversies intensified tensions. Media involvement and increased financial backing in the 1990s further amplified the antagonism, which has endured despite fluctuating periods of sporting success for both clubs.

== History ==
=== Emergence of the rivalry ===
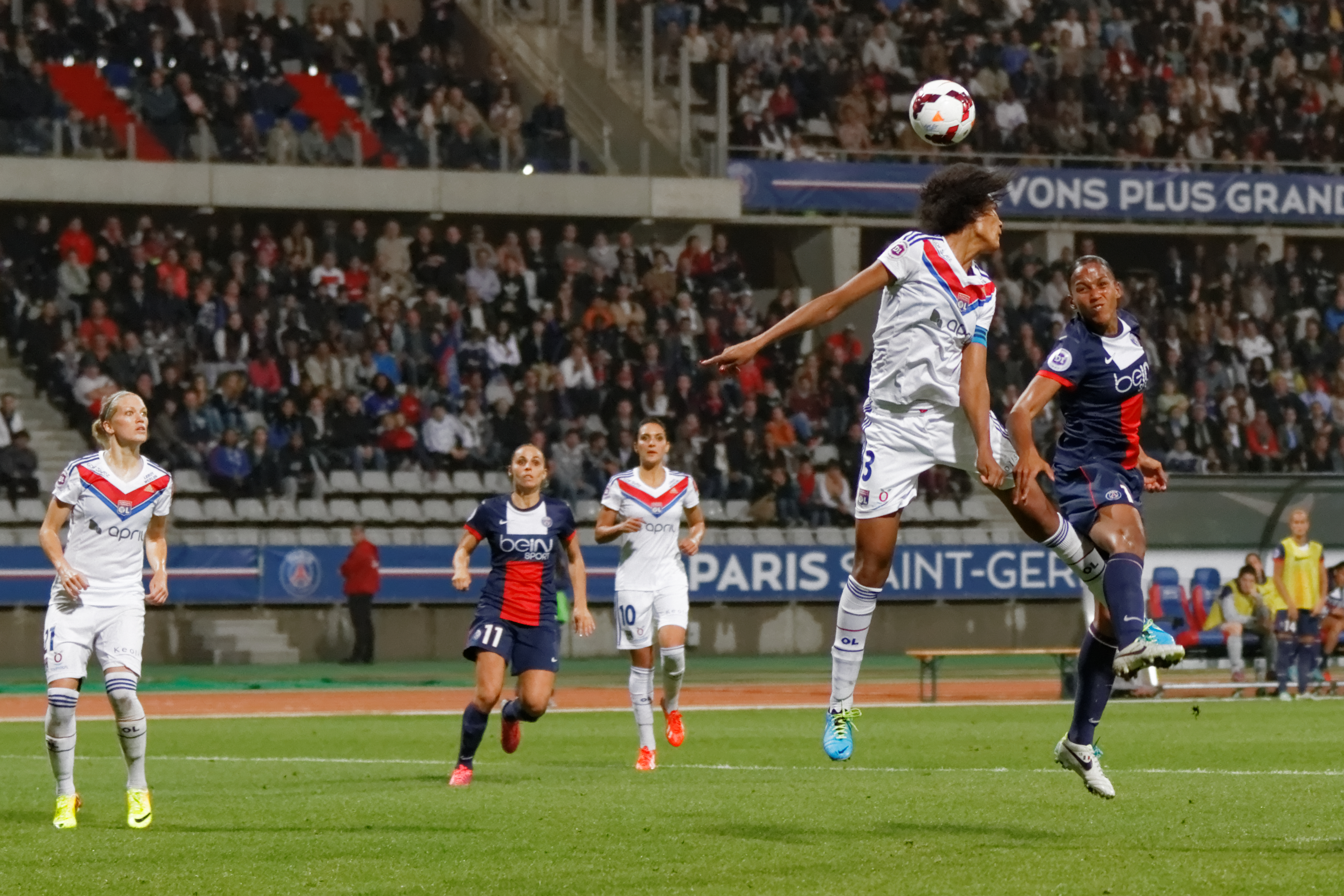
In September 2013, Lyon defeated PSG 3–0 in a Première Ligue match.

By the end of the 2000s, French women's football was dominated by OL Lyonnes, which won a record number of Première Ligue and UEFA Women's Champions League titles. Club president Jean-Michel Aulas was regarded as a pioneer in the development of women's football in France. Paris Saint-Germain FC (women) first faced Lyon in 1994, but it was not until the club's acquisition by Qatar Sports Investments (QSI) in 2012 that the two sides emerged as true rivals. Initially trailing, PSG rapidly closed the gap, using substantial financial backing to consistently challenge Lyon for league honours.

Since then, the two clubs have frequently finished in the top two positions of the Première Ligue and have faced each other several times in the Coupe de France Féminine final as well as in the Champions League. PSG defeated Lyon for the first time in 2014, marking a turning point in the rivalry. In 2015, the two teams met in the Champions League round of 16 for their first encounter on the European stage. PSG's Fatmire Alushi proved decisive in both legs: first with a delicate lob in the first leg to respond to Corine Franco's opening goal, and then with a close-range finish in the return leg to score the only goal and secure qualification for the Parisian side. PSG went on to reach the final, their first appearance at that stage, where they were defeated 2–1 by Eintracht Frankfurt.

The teams met again in the Champions League semi-finals in 2016. Weakened by the early exits of French internationals Laure Boulleau, Kheira Hamraoui and Laura Georges within the first half hour, PSG conceded seven goals in the first leg, including braces from Ada Hegerberg and Eugénie Le Sommer. Lyon recorded its largest-ever victory against PSG and equalled the record for the greatest goal difference in a European semi-final. The return leg ended 1–0 in favor of Lyon, offering little suspense. Two weeks later, Lyon secured its third Champions League title.

Two weeks apart, PSG experienced similar outcomes in consecutive finals against Lyon. Both matches ended level after regulation and extra time, with the winners decided by sixteen penalty kicks. Lyon claimed its seventh Coupe de France title before securing its fourth Champions League trophy, following the first all-French European final. The Champions League final finished goalless and featured decisive performances from both goalkeepers during the shoot-out. PSG's Polish international Katarzyna Kiedrzynek saved Eugénie Le Sommer's attempt but failed to convert her own penalty. At the other end, Sarah Bouhaddi denied Grace Geyoro's shot before scoring the decisive kick herself as the final taker, securing the trophy for Lyon.

=== Lyon dominance ===
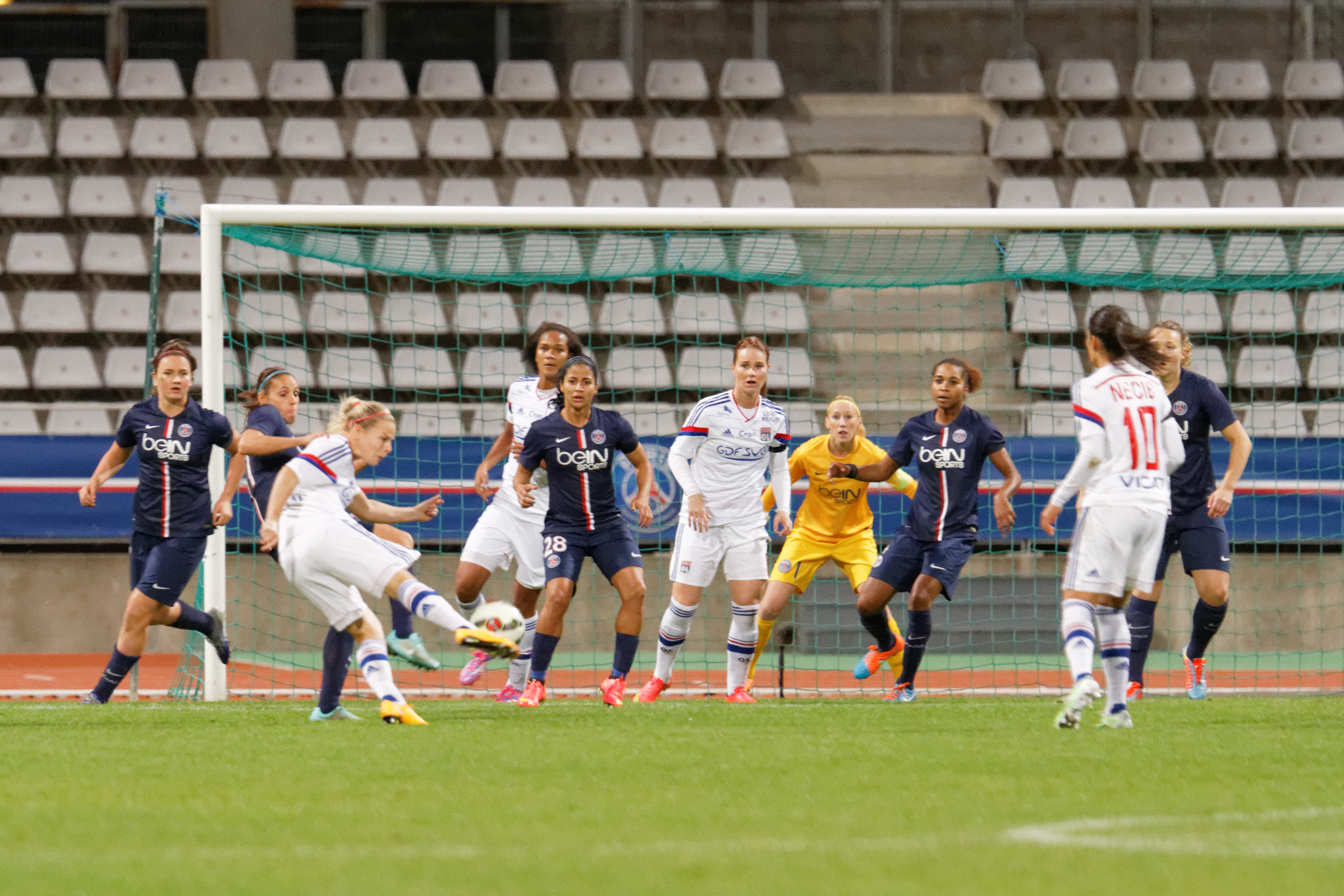
UEFA Women's Champions League match between PSG and Lyon in November 2014.

The fixture became increasingly anticipated, with public interest gradually growing, and came to be referred to as the women's Le Classique or Le Classico, in reference to the men's rivalry between Paris Saint-Germain and Olympique de Marseille. In 2018, PSG secured its first trophy against Lyon, winning the Coupe de France amid refereeing controversy. The victory symbolized a narrowing of the gap between the two teams. Lyon then went on to claim every major title until 2021. The COVID-19 pandemic disrupted the schedule of the Champions League in 2020, with the semi-finals played as single-leg matches. Played behind closed doors, the dismissal of PSG midfielder Grace Geyoro, followed by a header from Wendie Renard, sent Lyon through to the final.

The following season, PSG and Lyon met again in the Champions League quarter-finals under the traditional two-legged format. PSG were defeated at the Parc des Princes by a penalty converted by Wendie Renard but overturned the tie in Lyon with a 2–1 victory, qualifying on the away goals rule. An equalizer by Grace Geyoro and an own goal by Renard prevented Lyon from winning a sixth consecutive European title. In the league, PSG ended Lyon's 80-game unbeaten streak in November 2020 to move to the top of the table, with Marie-Antoinette Katoto scoring the only goal at the Parc des Princes. PSG then secured a crucial goalless draw away to Lyon to claim their first Première Ligue title, ending their Lyon's run of 14 consecutive championships.

In 2022, the two clubs reached the Champions League semi-finals while separated by only five points in the league standings. Lyon had suffered just one defeat, a 3–0 loss to PSG in the Coupe de France, while Paris had also recorded a single league loss, 6–1 against Lyon. Wendie Renard scored the equalizer in the first leg of the semi-final, narrowly won 3–2 by Lyon at home. In the return leg, with the score at 1–1, Renard headed in a free kick late in the match to secure Lyon's qualification. Three weeks later, Lyon won their eighth Champions League title. History repeated itself in 2024, as Lyon followed up a 3–2 first-leg comeback with a 2–1 victory away to PSG, advancing to their eleventh Champions League final, where they were defeated by Barcelona. In the 2024 and 2025 league finals, following the switch to a playoff system after the regular season, Lyon once again emerged victorious.

The inaugural Coupe LFFP, played at the Felix Houphouet Boigny Stadium in Abidjan, Ivory Coast, saw another Lyon victory over PSG. Despite a competitive start from the Parisian side, Lyon ultimately proved superior in the 2026 Coupe LFFP final, clinching the title with a second-half goal from Melchie Dumornay. Two months later, Lyon claimed another title by defeating PSG in the 2026 Coupe de France Féminine final. Lyon secured a comprehensive 4–1 victory, with PSG largely outplayed from the first half and suffering their fourth defeat to Lyon of the season. The title marked Lyon's eleventh triumph in the competition and their first since 2023.

== Transfer battles ==
The rivalry between the two leading French clubs also extends off the pitch, with both sides frequently competing to attract top players. Both clubs operate with comparable budgets, estimated at €7 million, placing them among the largest in women's football and well ahead of most domestic and European competitors. In the summer of 2016, four high-profile players left PSG for Lyon, including Kheira Hamraoui, while French international defender Ève Périsset joined PSG. In 2017, Amandine Henry, a prominent Lyon player, was loaned to PSG by her American club. At the end of the season, she caused controversy by returning to Lyon rather than joining Paris, which had facilitated her return to French football. In 2020, PSG goalkeeper Katarzyna Kiedrzynek declined an opportunity to join Lyon, explaining that the club was PSG's main rival and that she "simply could not do that."

In 2021, Lyon signed three PSG players at the end of their contracts: Christiane Endler, Signe Bruun and Perle Morroni, attracted by Lyon's more compelling sporting project. During this period, the club presidents exchanged public remarks through the media. In the same year, Sakina Karchaoui moved in the opposite direction, drawn by improved financial conditions. The exodus continued in subsequent seasons, with major PSG players, including Sara Däbritz, Kadidiatou Diani, Tabitha Chawinga, and Marie-Antoinette Katoto, all joining Lyon.

== Statistics ==
As of 17 October 2026.

Paris Saint-Germain OL Lyonnes Draw

=== Honours ===
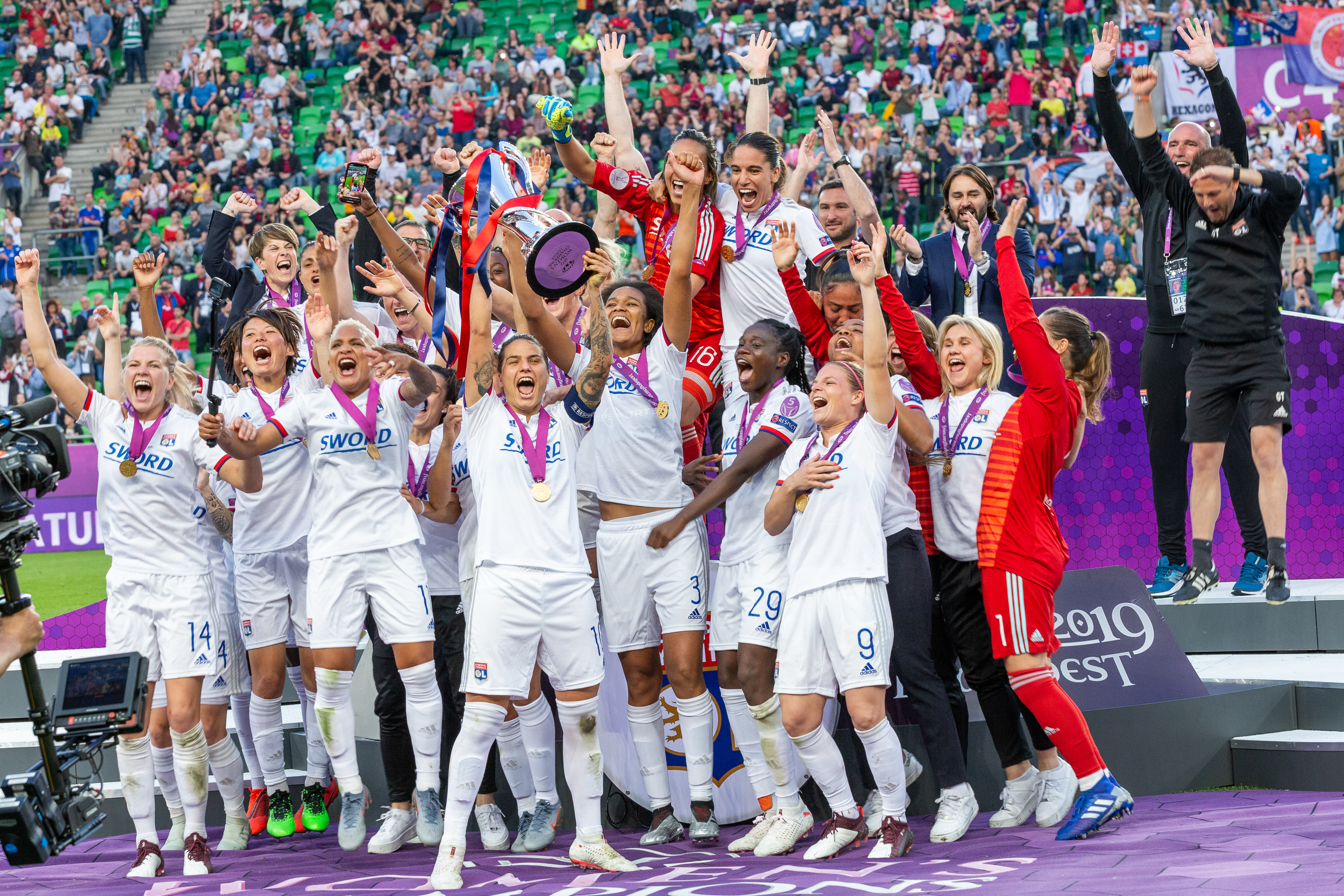
Lyon won the UEFA Women's Champions League in 2019.

Competition	Titles won	
Competition	PSG	Lyon
Première Ligue	1	19
Coupe de France Féminine	4	11
Coupe LFFP	0	1
Trophée des Championnes	0	3
National total	5	34
UEFA Women's Champions League	0	8
International total	0	8
Overall total	5	42

=== Head-to-head ===
Competition	Matches	Wins		Draws	Goals		Goal difference	
Competition	Matches	PSG	Lyon	Draws	PSG	Lyon	PSG	Lyon
Première Ligue	54	4	40	10	23	112	−89	+89
Coupe de France Féminine	10	2	5	3	8	14	−6	+6
Coupe LFFP	1	0	1	0	0	1	−1	+1
Trophée des Championnes	3	0	2	1	1	4	−3	+3
UEFA Women's Champions League	12	2	8	2	10	22	−12	+12
Total	80	8	56	16	42	153	−111	+111

== Matches ==
As of 17 October 2026.

Paris Saint-Germain OL Lyonnes Draw

=== Première Ligue ===
Première Ligue matches

2 October 1994 Matchday 3	Lyon	5–0	Paris Saint-Germain
		Report

5 February 1995 Matchday 14	Paris Saint-Germain	1–3	Lyon
		Report

9 December 2001 Matchday 11	Lyon	2–1	Paris Saint-Germain
	Creuzet-Laplantes 30', 56'	Report	Hoffele 75'

4 May 2002 Matchday 21	Paris Saint-Germain	1–1	Lyon
	Boyeldieu 55'	Report	Dessalle 66'

22 September 2002 Matchday 3	Paris Saint-Germain	2–5	Lyon
	Boyeldieu 9'; Hoffele 85'	Report	Granjon 6'; Creuzet-Laplantes 26' (pen.); Brétigny 41', 59'; Bruet 66'

1 May 2003 Matchday 13	Lyon	1–1	Paris Saint-Germain
	Brétigny 79'	Report	Freyermuth 20'

30 November 2003 Matchday 7	Paris Saint-Germain	0–1	Lyon	Bougival
		Report	Morel 49'	Stadium: Stade de la Banque de France; Attendance: 70; Referee: Fabienne Sagnier

7 March 2004 Matchday 17	Lyon	3–2	Paris Saint-Germain	Lyon
	Brétigny 30', 41'; Morel 36'	Report	Basse 79', 86'	Stadium: Plaine des Jeux de Gerland; Attendance: 50; Referee: Séverine Zinck

12 December 2004 Matchday 11	Paris Saint-Germain	0–3	Lyon	Saint-Germain-en-Laye
		Report	Morel 17'; Creuzet-Laplantes 31', 38'	Stadium: Stade Georges Lefèvre; Referee: Frédérique Neusch

17 April 2005 Matchday 21	Lyon	2–0	Paris Saint-Germain	Lyon
	Slaton 69'; Welsh 89'	Report		Stadium: Plaine des Jeux de Gerland; Attendance: 150; Referee: Audrey Cabrol

11 September 2005 Matchday 2	Lyon	1–0	Paris Saint-Germain	Lyon
	Morel 67'	Report		Stadium: Plaine des Jeux de Gerland; Attendance: 200; Referee: Florence Guillemin

11 December 2005 Matchday 12	Paris Saint-Germain	1–2	Lyon	Saint-Germain-en-Laye
	Morel 13'	Report	Jatobá 19'; Faye-Chellali 22'	Stadium: Stade Georges Lefèvre; Attendance: 150; Referee: Laure Courtas

12 November 2006 Matchday 7	Lyon	4–1	Paris Saint-Germain	Lyon
	Brétigny 14', 43', 55'; Bompastor 86'	Report	Pfeiffer 90+2'	Stadium: Plaine des Jeux de Gerland; Attendance: 200; Referee: Florence Guillemin

25 March 2007 Matchday 17	Paris Saint-Germain	1–2	Lyon	Saint-Germain-en-Laye
	Gobert 8'	Report	Lattaf 51'; Brétigny 57'	Stadium: Stade Georges Lefèvre; Attendance: 250; Referee: Florence Guillemin

9 September 2007 Matchday 2	Paris Saint-Germain	0–2	Lyon	Saint-Germain-en-Laye
15:00		Report	Cadamuro 19' (pen.); Lattaf 34'	Stadium: Camp des Loges; Attendance: 150; Referee: Marylin Rémy

20 January 2008 Matchday 12	Lyon	4–0	Paris Saint-Germain	Lyon
14:30	Abily 3', 84', 90'; Cruz 35'	Report		Stadium: Plaine des Jeux de Gerland; Attendance: 800; Referee: Dorothée Ily

23 August 2008 Matchday 1	Lyon	2–0	Paris Saint-Germain	Lyon
16:00	Georges 34'; Renard 47'	Report		Stadium: Plaine des Jeux de Gerland; Attendance: 150; Referee: Aurélie Efe

31 May 2009 Matchday 22	Paris Saint-Germain	0–2	Lyon	Le Pecq
15:00		Report	Schelin 57'; Stensland 84'	Stadium: Stade Louis Raffegeau; Attendance: 150; Referee: Karine Lasalle

13 December 2009 Matchday 10	Lyon	1–1	Paris Saint-Germain	Lyon
15:00	Brétigny 90+3'	Report	Poulain 38'	Stadium: Stade de Gerland; Attendance: 300; Referee: Séverine Zinck

30 May 2010 Matchday 22	Paris Saint-Germain	0–0	Lyon	Saint-Germain-en-Laye
15:00		Report		Stadium: Stade Georges Lefèvre; Attendance: 500; Referee: Noëlle Robin

19 January 2011 Matchday 9	Paris Saint-Germain	1–2	Lyon	Saint-Germain-en-Laye
20:00	Kátia 50'	Report	Dickenmann 53'; Thomis 82'	Stadium: Camp des Loges; Attendance: 250; Referee: Nathalie Le Breton

6 February 2011 Matchday 19	Lyon	3–0	Paris Saint-Germain	Lyon
13:00	Cadamuro 48'; Le Sommer 82'; Brétigny 85'	Report		Stadium: Stade de Gerland; Attendance: 200; Referee: Noëlle Robin

30 October 2011 Matchday 7	Paris Saint-Germain	0–0	Lyon	Créteil
15:00		Report		Stadium: Stade Dominique Duvauchelle; Attendance: 3,500; Referee: Nathalie Le Breton

20 May 2012 Matchday 17	Lyon	3–0	Paris Saint-Germain	Lyon
15:00	Cadamuro 16'; Bompastor 26', 69'	Report		Stadium: Stade de Gerland; Attendance: 4,500; Referee: Lugdivine Cinquini

17 November 2012 Matchday 9	Paris Saint-Germain	0–1	Lyon	Paris
13:00		Report	Henry 72' (pen.)	Stadium: Stade Sébastien Charléty; Attendance: 1,200; Referee: Séverine Craipeau

2 March 2013 Matchday 19	Lyon	3–0	Paris Saint-Germain	Lyon
20:50	Schelin 39', 62'; Henry 67' (pen.)	Report		Stadium: Stade de Gerland; Attendance: 6,512; Referee: Dorothée Ily

29 September 2013 Matchday 4	Paris Saint-Germain	0–3	Lyon	Paris
18:45		Report	Cadamuro 53'; Schelin 70'; Tonazzi 90+2'	Stadium: Stade Sébastien Charléty; Attendance: 1,000; Referee: Noëlle Robin

18 January 2014 Matchday 14	Lyon	0–1	Paris Saint-Germain	Lyon
20:45		Report	Georges 45'	Stadium: Stade de Gerland; Attendance: 7,512; Referee: Séverine Zinck

1 November 2014 Matchday 8	Lyon	2–1	Paris Saint-Germain	Lyon
20:50	Schelin 4'; Hegerberg 61'	Report	Kaci 8'	Stadium: Stade de Gerland; Attendance: 10,122; Referee: Florence Guillemin

21 February 2015 Matchday 18	Paris Saint-Germain	0–4	Lyon	Paris
20:50		Report	Abily 30'; Schelin 35'; Bussaglia 57'; Dickenmann 59'	Stadium: Stade Sébastien Charléty; Attendance: 4,000; Referee: Élodie Coppola

27 September 2015 Matchday 4	Lyon	5–0	Paris Saint-Germain	Lyon
14:55	Hegerberg 38', 53', 90'; Majri 42'; Houara 79' (o.g.)	Report		Stadium: Stade de Gerland; Attendance: 7,037; Referee: Élodie Coppola

5 February 2016 Matchday 15	Paris Saint-Germain	0–0	Lyon	Paris
18:45		Report		Stadium: Stade Sébastien Charléty; Attendance: 3,500; Referee: Florence Guillemin

17 December 2016 Matchday 11	Paris Saint-Germain	1–0	Lyon	Saint-Germain-en-Laye
18:45	Delie 83'	Report		Stadium: Stade Georges Lefèvre; Attendance: 1,858; Referee: Jennifer Maubacq

13 May 2017 Matchday 21	Lyon	3–0	Paris Saint-Germain	Décines-Charpieu
16:00	Le Sommer 13'; Hegerberg 27'; Morgan 28'	Report		Stadium: Parc Olympique Lyonnais; Attendance: 7,912; Referee: Florence Guillemin

11 December 2017 Matchday 11	Lyon	1–0	Paris Saint-Germain	Décines-Charpieu
21:00	Hegerberg 12'	Report		Stadium: Parc Olympique Lyonnais; Attendance: 7,050; Referee: Florence Guillemin

18 May 2018 Matchday 21	Paris Saint-Germain	0–0	Lyon	Saint-Germain-en-Laye
21:00		Report		Stadium: Stade Georges Lefèvre; Attendance: 1,440; Referee: Victoria Beyer

18 November 2018 Matchday 10	Paris Saint-Germain	1–1	Lyon	Paris
21:00	Shuang 15'	Report	Renard 19'	Stadium: Stade Jean-Bouin; Attendance: 8,704; Referee: Maïka Vanderstichel

13 April 2019 Matchday 20	Lyon	5–0	Paris Saint-Germain	Décines-Charpieu
20:45	Hegerberg 8'; Le Sommer 40'; Renard 45' (pen.); Marozsán 60'; Van de Sanden 90+2'	Report		Stadium: Parc Olympique Lyonnais; Attendance: 25,907; Referee: Victoria Beyer

16 November 2019 Matchday 9	Lyon	1–0	Paris Saint-Germain	Décines-Charpieu
17:30	Kumagai 49'	Report		Stadium: Parc Olympique Lyonnais; Attendance: 30,661; Referee: Victoria Beyer

14 March 2020 Matchday 17	Paris Saint-Germain	Cancelled	Lyon
		COVID-19 pandemic

20 November 2020 Matchday 9	Paris Saint-Germain	1–0	Lyon	Paris
21:00	Katoto 11'	Report		Stadium: Parc des Princes; Attendance: Behind closed doors Referee: Maïka Vanderstichel

30 May 2021 Matchday 16	Lyon	0–0	Paris Saint-Germain	Décines-Charpieu
21:00		Report		Stadium: Parc Olympique Lyonnais; Attendance: Behind closed doors Referee: Stéphanie Frappart

14 November 2021 Matchday 8	Lyon	6–1	Paris Saint-Germain	Décines-Charpieu
21:00	Macario 15' (pen.); Van de Donk 18'; Malard 53'; Egurrola 59'; Hegerberg 79', 82'	Report	Ilestedt 75'	Stadium: Parc Olympique Lyonnais; Attendance: 13,497; Referee: Sílvia Andreia Rosa Domingos (Portugal)

29 May 2022 Matchday 21	Paris Saint-Germain	0–1	Lyon	Paris
21:00		Report	Macario 3'	Stadium: Stade Jean-Bouin; Attendance: 4,338; Referee: Alexandra Collin

11 December 2022 Matchday 11	Lyon	0–1	Paris Saint-Germain	Décines-Charpieu
21:00		Report	Diani 87'	Stadium: Parc Olympique Lyonnais; Attendance: 13,400; Referee: Maïka Vanderstichel

21 May 2023 Matchday 21	Paris Saint-Germain	0–1	Lyon	Paris
21:00		Report	Bruun 88'	Stadium: Parc des Princes; Attendance: 18,876; Referee: Victoria Beyer

1 October 2023 Matchday 2	Paris Saint-Germain	0–1	Lyon	Paris
21:00		Report	Le Sommer 20'	Stadium: Parc des Princes; Attendance: 15,899; Referee: Émeline Rochebilière

11 February 2024 Matchday 15	Lyon	1–1	Paris Saint-Germain	Décines-Charpieu
21:00	De Almeida 90' (o.g.)	Report	Chawinga 66'	Stadium: Parc Olympique Lyonnais; Attendance: 21,764; Referee: Clémence Gonçalves

17 May 2024 Final	Lyon	2–1	Paris Saint-Germain	Décines-Charpieu
21:00	Cascarino 18'; Diani 22'	Report	Chawinga 73'	Stadium: Parc Olympique Lyonnais; Attendance: 15,660; Referee: Maïka Vanderstichel

3 November 2024 Matchday 6	Lyon	1–0	Paris Saint-Germain	Décines-Charpieu
14:00	Chawinga 27'	Report		Stadium: Parc Olympique Lyonnais; Attendance: 15,386; Referee: Élisa Daupeux

18 January 2025 Matchday 13	Paris Saint-Germain	0–2	Lyon	Paris
21:00		Report	Dumornay 7'; Diani 31'	Stadium: Parc des Princes; Attendance: 20,489; Referee: Alexandra Collin

16 May 2025 Final	Lyon	3–0	Paris Saint-Germain	Décines-Charpieu
21:00	Dumornay 45+2'; Dudek 80' (o.g.); Renard 90+4' (pen.)	Report		Stadium: Parc Olympique Lyonnais; Attendance: 10,500; Referee: Alexandra Collin

27 September 2025 Matchday 3	Lyon	6–1	Paris Saint-Germain	Décines-Charpieu
21:00	Tarciane 5'; Heaps 58'; Shrader 70', 74', 85'; Chawinga 90+3'	Report	Leuchter 33' (pen.)	Stadium: Parc Olympique Lyonnais; Attendance: 10,432; Referee: Émeline Rochebilière

1 February 2026 Matchday 14	Paris Saint-Germain	0–1	Lyon	Paris
15:00		Report	Chawinga 23'	Stadium: Parc des Princes; Attendance: 14,070; Referee: Clémence Gonçalves

17 October 2026 Matchday 5	Paris Saint-Germain	0–4	Lyon	Paris
21:00		Report	Dumornay 3'; Katoto 39'; Bècho 48'; Paralluelo 59'	Stadium: Parc des Princes; Attendance: 13,627; Referee: Alexandra Collin

=== Coupe de France Féminine ===
Coupe de France Féminine matches

3 June 2008 Final	Paris Saint-Germain	0–3	Lyon	Saint-Denis
17:30		Report	Cruz 52'; Cadamuro 59'; Abily 78'	Stadium: Stade de France; Attendance: 3,000; Referee: Séverine Craipeau

25 April 2010 Semi-finals	Paris Saint-Germain	1–1 (3–2 p)	Lyon	Saint-Germain-en-Laye
15:00	Pizzala 12'	Report	Herlovsen 19'	Stadium: Stade Georges Lefèvre; Attendance: 700; Referee: Florence Guillemin
	Penalties
	Lepailleur (penalty scored); Houara (penalty missed); Bussaglia (penalty scored); Debonne (penalty missed); Soyer (penalty scored)		(penalty scored) Brétigny; (penalty missed) Henry; (penalty missed) Franco; (penalty scored) Kaci; (penalty missed) Cadamuro

7 June 2014 Final	Lyon	2–0	Paris Saint-Germain	Le Mans
20:55	Dickenmann 58'; Franco 61'	Report		Stadium: Stade Marie-Marvingt; Attendance: 6,588; Referee: Séverine Zinck

19 May 2017 Final	Paris Saint-Germain	1–1 (6–7 p)	Lyon	Vannes
21:00	Cristiane 7'	Report	Kumagai 34' (pen.)	Stadium: Stade de la Rabine; Attendance: 6,616; Referee: Solen Dallongeville
	Penalties
	Delannoy (penalty scored); Delie (penalty scored); Périsset (penalty scored); Formiga (penalty scored); Paredes (penalty missed); Boquete (penalty scored); Diallo (penalty scored); Sarr (penalty missed)		(penalty scored) Majri; (penalty scored) Le Sommer; (penalty scored) Renard; (penalty scored) Mbock; (penalty missed) Kumagai; (penalty scored) Marozsán; (penalty scored) Abily; (penalty scored) Hegerberg

31 May 2018 Final	Paris Saint-Germain	1–0	Lyon	Strasbourg
21:00	Katoto 16'	Report		Stadium: Stade de la Meinau; Attendance: 12,480; Referee: Florence Guillemin

9 February 2019 Quarter-finals	Lyon	1–0	Paris Saint-Germain	Décines-Charpieu
15:45	Fishlock 60'	Report		Stadium: Parc Olympique Lyonnais; Attendance: 10,217; Referee: Florence Guillemin

9 August 2020 Final	Lyon	0–0 (4–3 p)	Paris Saint-Germain	Auxerre
21:00		Report		Stadium: Stade de l'Abbé-Deschamps; Attendance: 4,500; Referee: Victoria Beyer
	Penalties
	Majri (penalty scored); Marozsán (penalty scored); Renard (penalty scored); Le Sommer (penalty missed); Bronze (penalty scored)		(penalty scored) Nadim; (penalty scored) Däbritz; (penalty scored) Bruun; (penalty missed) Endler; (penalty missed) Khelifi

29 January 2022 Round of 16	Paris Saint-Germain	3–0	Lyon	Saint-Germain-en-Laye
14:00	Baltimore 48'; Diani 76'; Katoto 85'	Report		Stadium: Stade Georges Lefèvre; Attendance: 420; Referee: Victoria Beyer

13 May 2023 Final	Lyon	2–1	Paris Saint-Germain	Orléans
16:00	Hegerberg 12', 23'	Report	Bachmann 36' (pen.)	Stadium: Stade de la Source; Attendance: 6,127; Referee: Alexandra Collin

10 May 2026 Final	Paris Saint-Germain	1–4	Lyon	Valenciennes
15:30	Kanjinga 63'	Report	Dumornay 23'; Bècho 35', 40'; Heaps 74'	Stadium: Stade du Hainaut; Attendance: 12,858; Referee: Élisa Daupeux

=== Coupe LFFP ===
Coupe LFFP matches

14 March 2026 Final	Lyon	1–0	Paris Saint-Germain	Abidjan, Ivory Coast
18:30	Dumornay 59'	Report		Stadium: Felix Houphouet Boigny Stadium; Attendance: 24,000; Referee: Émeline Rochebilière

=== Trophée des Championnes ===
Trophée des Championnes matches

21 September 2019 Final	Lyon	1–1 (4–3 p)	Paris Saint-Germain	Guingamp
15:30	Majri 31'	Report	Nadim 43'	Stadium: Stade de Roudourou; Attendance: 12,588; Referee: Marie-Soleil Beaudoin (Canada)
	Penalties
	Majri (penalty scored); Mbock (penalty scored); Le Sommer (penalty missed); Hegerberg (penalty scored)		(penalty missed) Katoto; (penalty scored) Däbritz; (penalty scored) Diani; (penalty scored) Dudek; (penalty missed) Geyoro

28 August 2022 Final	Lyon	1–0	Paris Saint-Germain	Dunkirk
21:00	Van de Donk 13'	Report		Stadium: Stade Marcel-Tribut; Attendance: 4,472; Referee: Émeline Rochebilière

10 September 2023 Final	Lyon	2–0	Paris Saint-Germain	Troyes
21:00	Dumornay 35'; Le Sommer 67'	Report		Stadium: Stade de l'Aube; Attendance: 5,283; Referee: Victoria Beyer

=== UEFA Women's Champions League ===
UEFA Women's Champions League matches

8 November 2014 Round of 16	Paris Saint-Germain	1–1	Lyon	Paris
18:00	Alushi 49'	Report	Franco 21'	Stadium: Stade Sébastien Charléty; Attendance: 6,300; Referee: Kateryna Monzul (Ukraine)

12 November 2014 Round of 16	Lyon	0–1 (1–2 agg.)	Paris Saint-Germain	Lyon
18:45		Report	Alushi 79'	Stadium: Stade de Gerland; Attendance: 8,488; Referee: Katalin Kulcsár (Hungary)

23 April 2016 Semi-finals	Lyon	7–0	Paris Saint-Germain	Décines-Charpieu
15:00	Hegerberg 18', 40'; Le Sommer 28', 42'; Abily 45'; Cadamuro 73'; Schelin 76'	Report		Stadium: Parc Olympique Lyonnais; Attendance: 22,050; Referee: Bibiana Steinhaus (Germany)

2 May 2016 Semi-finals	Paris Saint-Germain	0–1 (0–8 agg.)	Lyon	Paris
20:45		Report	Schelin 44'	Stadium: Parc des Princes; Attendance: 5,855; Referee: Esther Staubli (Switzerland)

1 June 2017 Final	Lyon	0–0 (a.e.t.) (7–6 p)	Paris Saint-Germain	Cardiff, Wales
20:45		Report		Stadium: Cardiff City Stadium; Attendance: 22,433; Referee: Bibiana Steinhaus (Germany)
	Penalties
	Majri (penalty scored); Le Sommer (penalty missed); Renard (penalty scored); Mbock (penalty scored); Kumagai (penalty scored); Marozsán (penalty scored); Abily (penalty scored); Bouhaddi (penalty scored)		(penalty scored) Cristiane; (penalty scored) Delannoy; (penalty missed) Geyoro; (penalty scored) Delie; (penalty scored) Formiga; (penalty scored) Boquete; (penalty scored) Lawrence; (penalty missed) Kiedrzynek

26 August 2020 Semi-finals	Paris Saint-Germain	0–1	Lyon	Bilbao
20:00		Report	Renard 67'	Stadium: San Mamés; Attendance: Behind closed doors Referee: Anastasia Pustovoitova (Russia)

24 March 2021 Quarter-finals	Paris Saint-Germain	0–1	Lyon	Paris
18:00		Report	Renard 86' (pen.)	Stadium: Parc des Princes; Attendance: Behind closed doors Referee: Esther Staubli (Switzerland)

18 April 2021 Quarter-finals	Lyon	1–2 (2–2a agg.)	Paris Saint-Germain	Décines-Charpieu
14:00	Macario 4'	Report	Geyoro 24'; Renard 61' (o.g.)	Stadium: Parc Olympique Lyonnais; Attendance: Behind closed doors Referee: Ivana Martinčić (Croatia)

24 April 2022 Semi-finals	Lyon	3–2	Paris Saint-Germain	Décines-Charpieu
17:00	Renard 23' (pen.); Macario 33', 50'	Report	Katoto 6'; Dudek 58' (pen.)	Stadium: Parc Olympique Lyonnais; Attendance: 22,774; Referee: Ivana Martinčić (Croatia)

30 April 2022 Semi-finals	Paris Saint-Germain	1–2 (3–5 agg.)	Lyon	Paris
21:00	Katoto 62'	Report	Hegerberg 14'; Renard 83'	Stadium: Parc des Princes; Attendance: 43,254; Referee: Rebecca Welch (England)

20 April 2024 Semi-finals	Lyon	3–2	Paris Saint-Germain	Décines-Charpieu
19:00	Diani 80'; Dumornay 85'; Majri 86'	Report	Katoto 43', 48'	Stadium: Parc Olympique Lyonnais; Attendance: 38,466; Referee: Marta Huerta de Aza (Spain)

28 April 2024 Semi-finals	Paris Saint-Germain	1–2 (3–5 agg.)	Lyon	Paris
16:00	Chawinga 41'	Report	Bacha 3'; Dumornay 81'	Stadium: Parc des Princes; Attendance: 29,400; Referee: Ivana Projkovska (North Macedonia)

== Records ==
As of 17 October 2026.

Paris Saint-Germain OL Lyonnes Draw

=== Most appearances ===
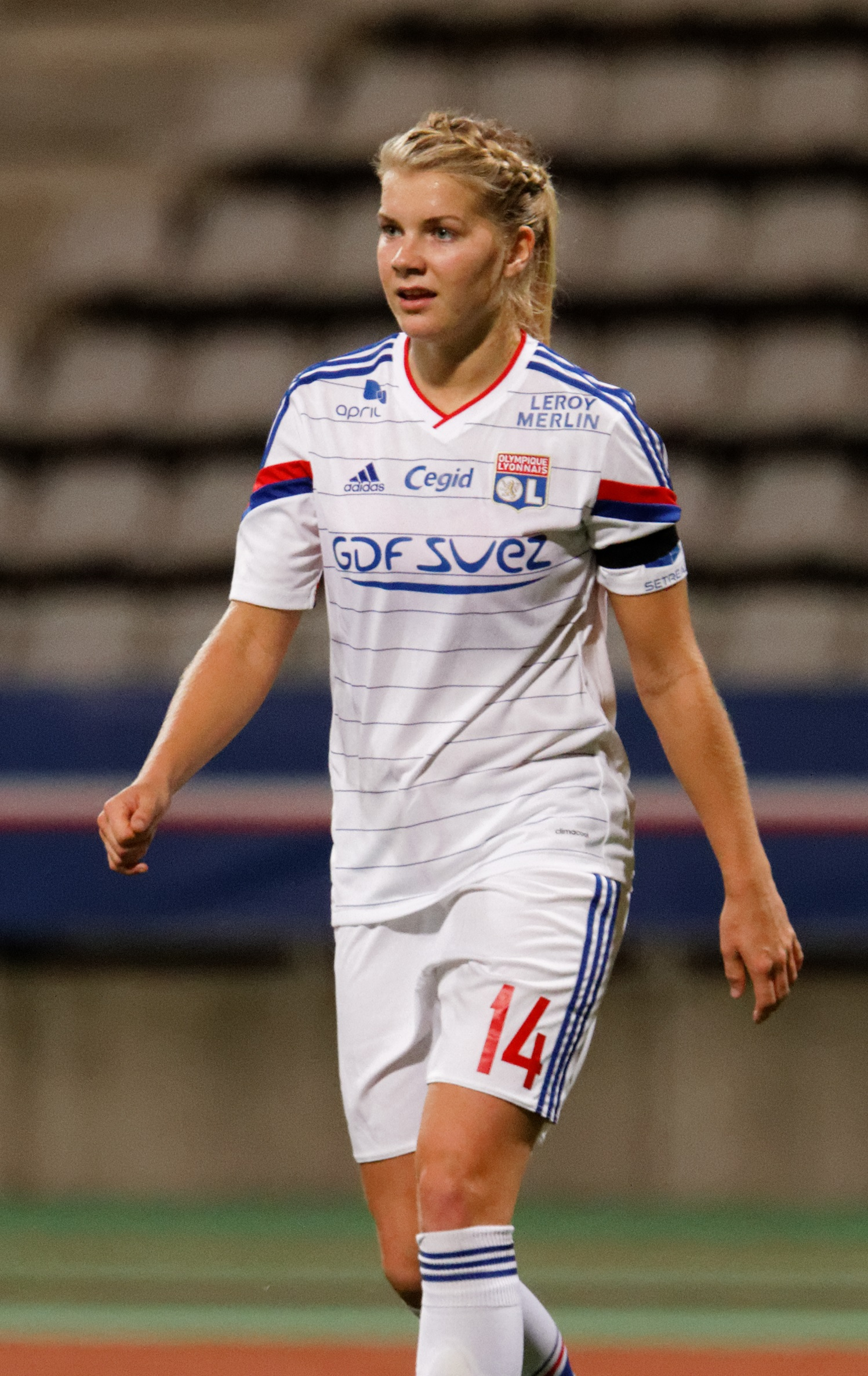
Ada Hegerberg

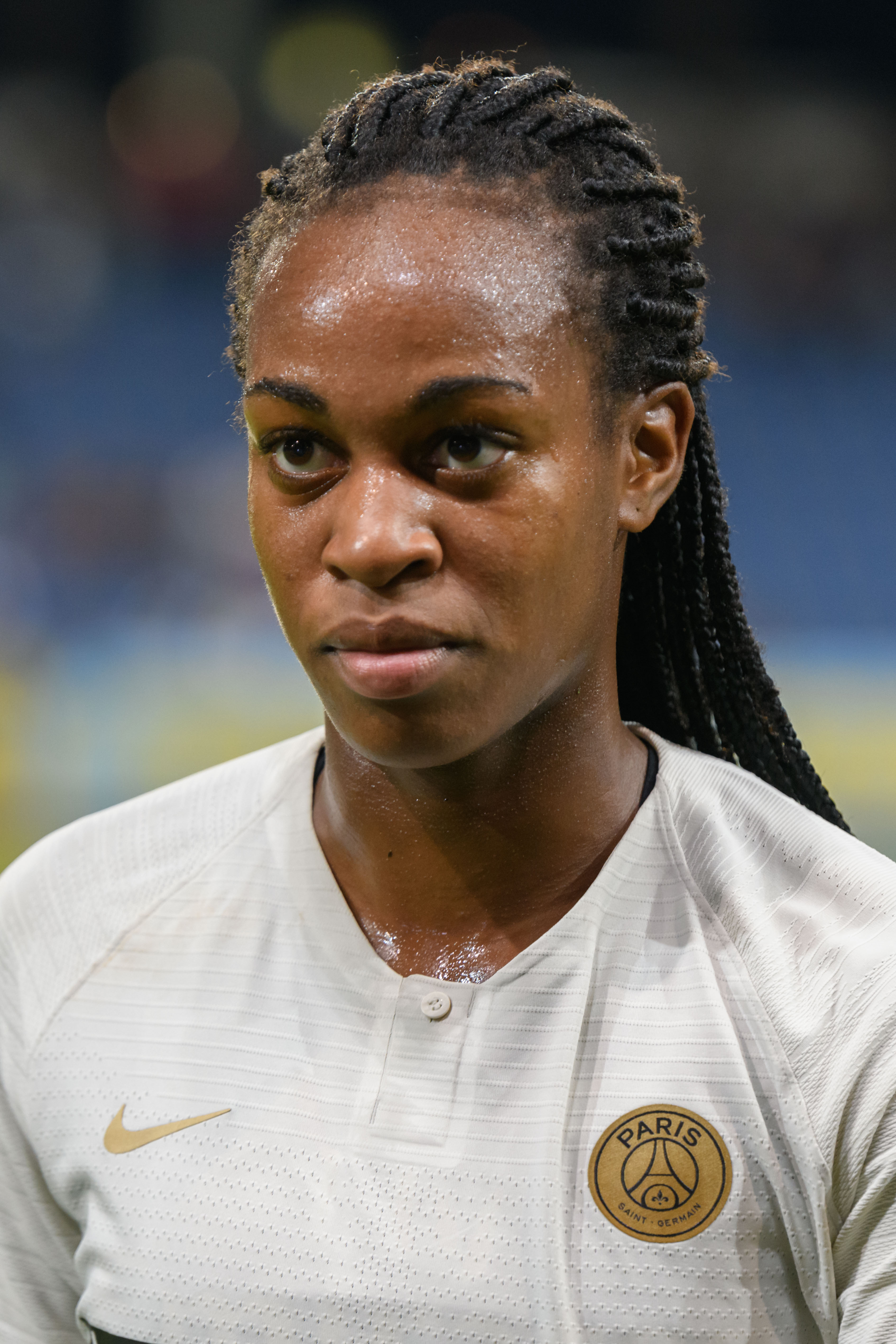
Marie-Antoinette Katoto

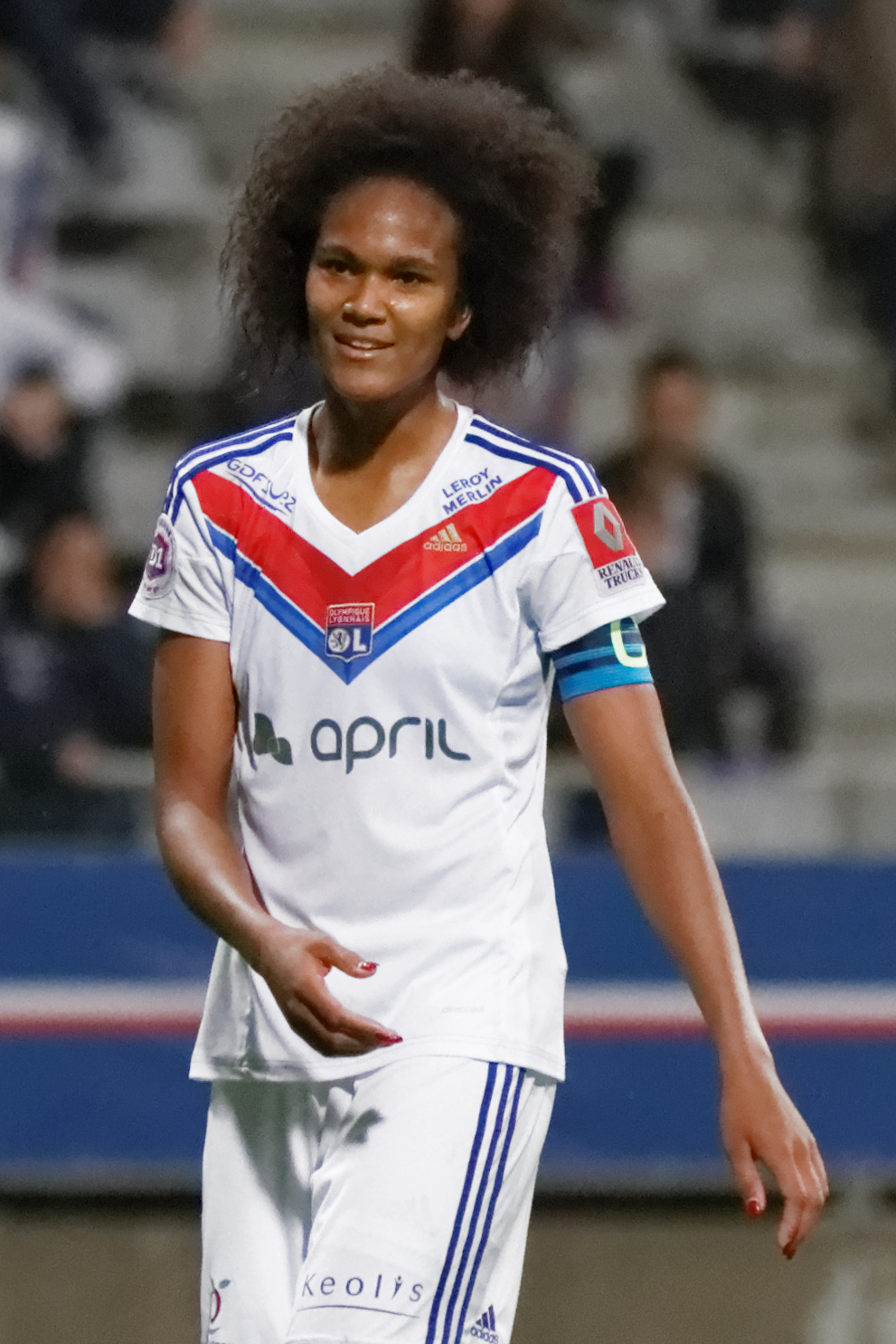
Wendie Renard

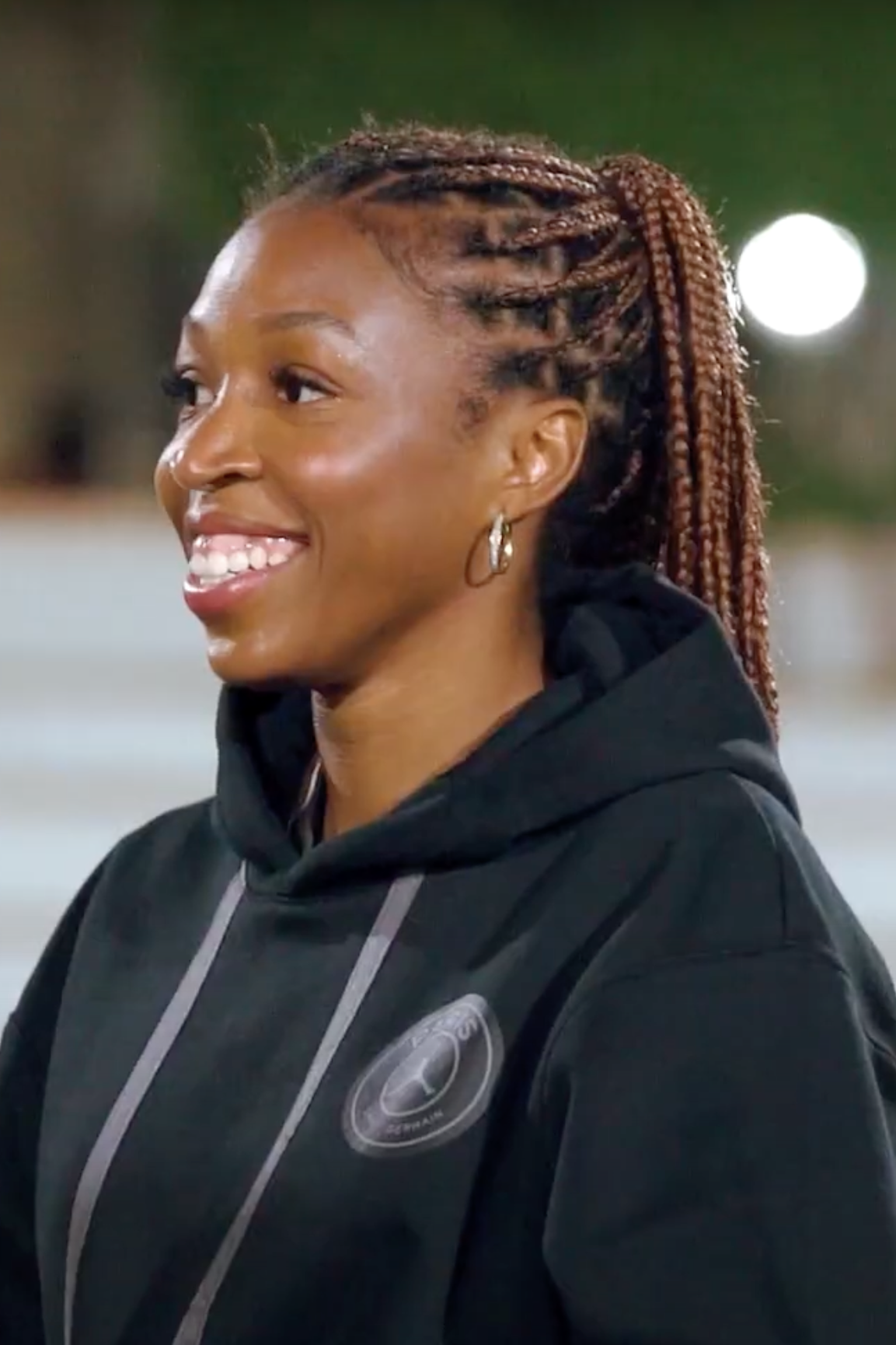
Grace Geyoro

Rank	Player	Position	Club	Period	Apps
1	(France) Wendie Renard	DF	Lyon	2006–	59
2	(France) Eugénie Le Sommer	FW	Lyon	2010–2025	45
3	(France) Grace Geyoro	MF	PSG	2014–2025	37
4	(Norway) Ada Hegerberg	FW	Lyon	2014–	35
5	(France) Amel Majri	MF	Lyon	2010–2025	34
6	(France) Kadidiatou Diani	FW	PSG	2017–2023	33
6	(France) Kadidiatou Diani	FW	Lyon	2023–2026	33
7	(Chile) Christiane Endler	GK	PSG	2017–2021	33
7	(Chile) Christiane Endler	GK	Lyon	2021–	33
8	(France) Sarah Bouhaddi	GK	Lyon	2009–2022	32
8	(France) Sarah Bouhaddi	GK	PSG	2022–2023	32
9	(France) Sabrina Delannoy	DF	PSG	2005–2017	32
11	(France) Marie-Antoinette Katoto	FW	PSG	2015–2025	31
11	(France) Marie-Antoinette Katoto	FW	Lyon	2025–	31
12	(France) Amandine Henry	MF	Lyon	2007–2016	30
12	(France) Amandine Henry	MF	PSG	2017	30
12	(France) Amandine Henry	MF	Lyon	2018–2023	30
12	(Costa Rica) Shirley Cruz	MF	Lyon	2006–2012	29
12	(Costa Rica) Shirley Cruz	MF	PSG	2012–2018	29
13	(Canada) Ashley Lawrence	DF	PSG	2015–2025	29
13	(Canada) Ashley Lawrence	DF	Lyon	2025–	29

=== Top goalscorers ===
Rank	Player	Position	Club	Period	Goals
1	(Norway) Ada Hegerberg	FW	Lyon	2014–	14
2	(France) Sandrine Brétigny	FW	Lyon	2001–2012	11
3	(France) Wendie Renard	DF	Lyon	2006–	8
4	(Sweden) Lotta Schelin	FW	Lyon	2008–2016	8
5	(France) Melchie Dumornay	MF	Lyon	2023–	8
6	(France) Marie-Antoinette Katoto	FW	PSG	2015–2025	8
6	(France) Marie-Antoinette Katoto	FW	Lyon	2025–	8
7	(France) Eugénie Le Sommer	FW	Lyon	2010–2025	7
8	(Malawi) Tabitha Chawinga	FW	PSG	2023–2024	6
8	(Malawi) Tabitha Chawinga	FW	Lyon	2024–	6

=== Biggest wins ===
Date	Competition	Home team	Result	Away team	Margin
23 April 2016	UEFA Women's Champions League	Lyon	7–0	PSG	7 goals
21 February 2015	Première Ligue	PSG	0–4	Lyon	4 goals
29 January 2022	Coupe de France Féminine	PSG	3–0	Lyon	3 goals
18 April 2021	UEFA Women's Champions League	Lyon	1–2	PSG	1 goal

=== Highest-scoring matches ===
Rank	Date	Competition	Home team	Result	Away team	Goals
1	22 September 2002	Première Ligue	PSG	2–5	Lyon	7
2	23 April 2016	UEFA Women's Champions League	Lyon	7–0	PSG	7
3	14 November 2021	Première Ligue	Lyon	6–1	PSG	7
4	27 September 2025	Première Ligue	Lyon	6–1	PSG	7

=== Longest winning runs ===
Rank	Club	From	To	Wins
1	Lyon	30 November 2003	31 May 2009	13
2	Lyon	20 April 2024	Present	11
3	Lyon	20 May 2012	29 September 2013	4
4	Lyon	24 April 2022	28 August 2022	4
5	Lyon	13 May 2023	1 October 2023	4

=== Longest unbeaten runs ===
Rank	Club	From	To	Wins	Draws	Matches
1	Lyon	2 October 1994	29 September 2013	23	6	29
2	Lyon	13 May 2023	Present	15	1	16
3	Lyon	18 November 2018	26 August 2020	4	3	7
4	Lyon	21 February 2015	2 May 2016	4	1	5
5	Lyon	13 May 2017	18 May 2018	2	3	5
6	Lyon	29 May 2022	28 August 2022	4	0	4
7	PSG	18 May 2018	18 November 2018	1	2	3

=== Highest attendances ===
Home team	Date	Competition	Stadium	Attendance
PSG	30 April 2022	UEFA Women's Champions League	Parc des Princes	43,254
Lyon	20 April 2024	UEFA Women's Champions League	Parc Olympique Lyonnais	38,466
Neutral	14 March 2026	Coupe LFFP	Felix Houphouet Boigny Stadium	24,000

== Playing for both clubs ==
A total of 39 players have played for both clubs during their careers.

=== List of players ===
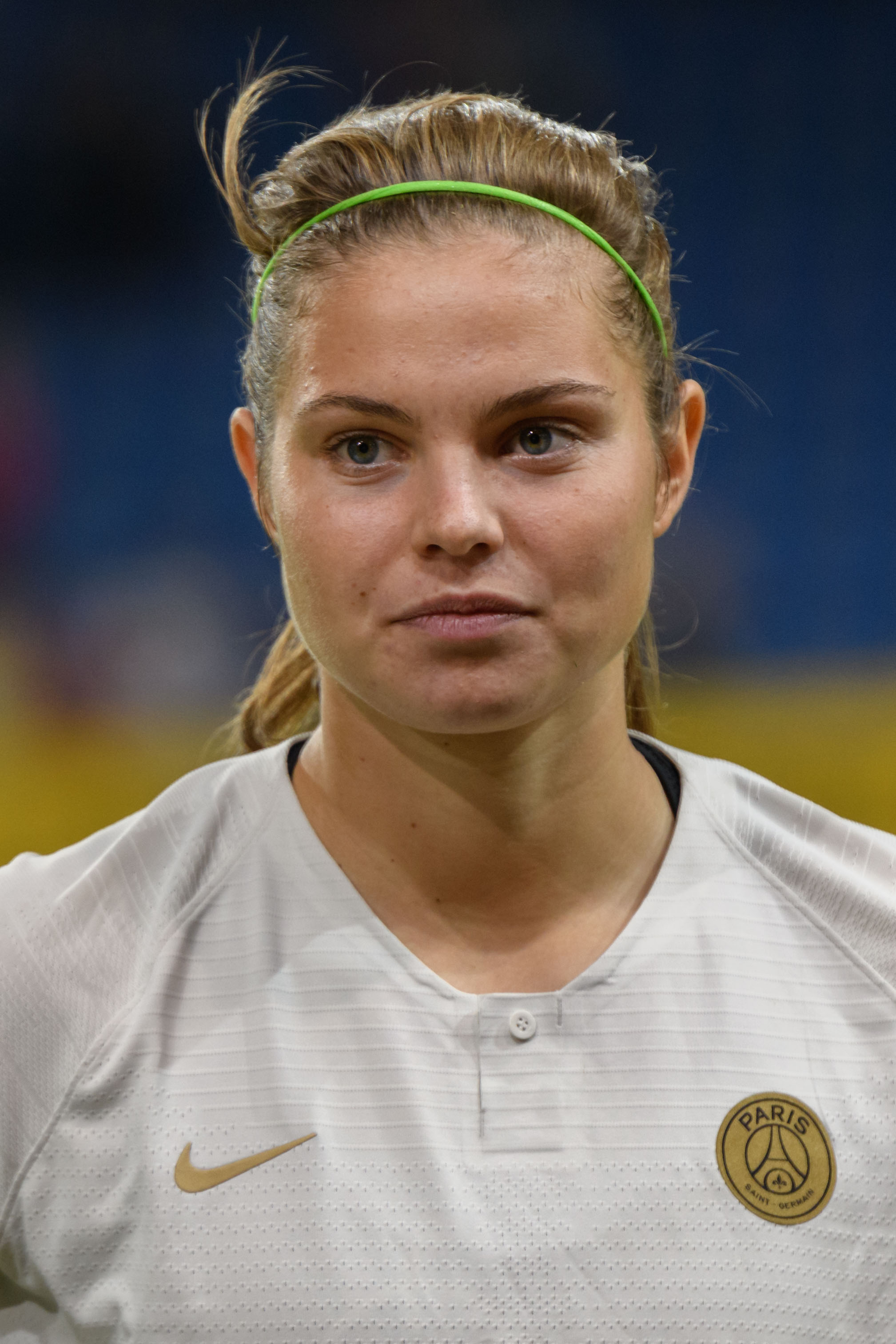
Signe Bruun

No.	Player
1	(France) Alice Sombath
2	(France) Amandine Henry
3	(Canada) Ashley Lawrence
4	(France) Aurélie Kaci
5	(France) Camille Abily
6	(Sweden) Caroline Seger
7	(France) Céline Deville
8	(Chile) Christiane Endler
9	(France) Delphine Blanc
10	(France) Élise Bussaglia
11	(France) Estelle Cascarino
12	(France) Ève Périsset
13	(France) Griedge Mbock Bathy
14	(France) Gwenaëlle Pelé
15	(France) Inès Dhaou

No.	Player
16	(France) Jessica Houara
17	(Germany) Josephine Henning
18	(France) Kadidiatou Diani
19	(Brazil) Kátia
20	(France) Kenza Dali
21	(France) Kheira Hamraoui
22	(United States) Korbin Shrader
23	(France) Laura Georges
24	(France) Laure Lepailleur
25	(United States) Lindsey Heaps
26	(France) Marie-Antoinette Katoto
27	(France) Méline Gérard
28	(France) Perle Morroni
29	(Brazil) Rosana
30	(France) Sakina Karchaoui

No.	Player
31	(Germany) Sara Däbritz
32	(France) Sarah Bouhaddi
33	(France) Saïda Akherraze
34	(Costa Rica) Shirley Cruz
35	(Denmark) Signe Bruun
36	(France) Sonia Bompastor
37	(Malawi) Tabitha Chawinga
38	(France) Véronique Pons
39	(France) Vicki Bècho

== Men's rivalry ==
The men's Le Classique is contested between Paris Saint-Germain FC (PSG) and Olympique de Marseille (OM). It is widely regarded as the biggest rivalry in French football and one of the most notable fixtures in world football, involving the two most successful clubs in France and the only French teams to have won major European trophies. The match is often compared to Spain's El Clásico and attracts significant attention in domestic and international football circles.

PSG and OM were the dominant French teams prior to the emergence of Olympique Lyonnais in the 2000s and remain the most followed French clubs internationally. Both clubs consistently rank among the highest in French attendances. Early clashes in the 1970s gave little indication of a major rivalry: PSG, a newly formed club, was still building competitiveness, while OM were established Ligue 1 contenders. The rivalry began in earnest in the 1980s, particularly after PSG won their first league title in 1986 and Marseille was acquired by businessman Bernard Tapie. By the end of the decade, the two clubs were competing closely for the Ligue 1 title, with tensions heightened by accusations of match-fixing and other controversies.

In the 1990s, the rivalry intensified. French media company Canal+ purchased PSG in 1991, partly to challenge Marseille's dominance, while media coverage helped promote the animosity between the clubs. With financial backing and growing media attention, PSG and OM became the main contenders for national honours. Although both teams were less successful in the 2000s, the rivalry remained strong. In the 2010s, PSG's significant investment from Qatar Sports Investments (QSI) allowed the club to dominate domestically, further intensifying the rivalry. Matches regularly draw large crowds, high television audiences, and require heightened security due to passionate fan support.
