= 2026 Coupe LFFP final =

- Match programme cover
- Event: 2025–26 Coupe LFFP
OL Lyonnes	Paris Saint-Germain
Première Ligue	Première Ligue
1	0
- Date: 14 March 2026
- Venue: Felix Houphouet Boigny Stadium, Abidjan
- Referee: Émeline Rochebilière (France)
- Attendance: 27,900
- Weather: Passing clouds 28 °C (82 °F); 84% humidity

The 2026 Coupe LFFP final was the final match of the 2025–26 Coupe LFFP, the inaugural season of France's women's football league cup competition organised by the Ligue féminine de football professionnel (LFFP). The match was played at Felix Houphouet Boigny Stadium in Abidjan, Ivory Coast, on 14 March 2026, between Première Ligue side OL Lyonnes and Paris Saint-Germain.

OL Lyonnes won the match 1–0 to claim the title in the inaugural edition, becoming the first winners of the competition.

== Teams ==
The inaugural final was Le Classique féminin between OL Lyonnes and Paris Saint-Germain, the two dominant clubs in French women's football. Exempted from the group stage, both teams entered the competition at the quarter-finals, where they won their quarter-final and semi-final matches to reach the final.

=== Route to the final ===
Note: In all results below, the score of the finalist is given first (H: home; A: away).

OL Lyonnes		Round	Paris Saint-Germain	
Opponent	Result	Round	Opponent	Result
Les Marseillaises	4–0 (H)	Quarter-finals	Thonon Evian GG FC	3–0 (H)
Dijon FCO	4–0 (A)	Semi-finals	Paris FC	3–0 (H)

== Venue ==
Following the confirmation of the establishment of the competition on 28 April 2025, Jean-Michel Aulas announced that the final would be held in Abidjan, Ivory Coast. On 25 February 2026, the Félix Houphouët-Boigny Stadium was confirmed as the venue for the final.

2026 Coupe LFFP final is located in Ivory Coast	Abidjan
2026 Coupe LFFP final is located in Ivory Coast	Felix Houphouet Boigny Stadium
2026 Coupe LFFP final is located in Ivory Coast	Capacity: 33,000

=== Boycott ===
Supporters of both teams announced a boycott of the final in Abidjan. The protest stems from the decision to stage the inaugural final outside France (in Côte d'Ivoire). Supporter groups argued that the relocation distances the event from the clubs' local roots and makes travel difficult and costly, particularly for organised fan groups, while prioritising promotion and funding over supporter accessibility and the traditional popular dimension of the game.

On 16 February 2026, Lyon's supporter group, the OL Ang'Elles, announced that they would boycott the match. In their statement, the group said that although they normally follow the team "everywhere", the relocation of the final abroad crossed a line, and confirmed that they would neither travel nor provide organised support in the stands. PSG Féminine supporters subsequently announced that they would take the same decision.

== Match ==
=== Summary ===
The final began at a measured tempo, with both teams showing attacking intent while remaining defensively organized. Paris Saint-Germain focused on controlled build-up play, whereas OL Lyonnes looked to create danger through quicker transitions and set pieces. Clear chances were limited in the opening half, although OL Lyonnes came closest to scoring when Tabitha Chawinga found the net in the 35th minute, only for the goal to be ruled out for offside.

After the break, OL Lyonnes increased their pressure and took control territorially. A penalty initially awarded for a challenge on Chawinga was overturned following a VAR review. The decisive moment arrived in the 59th minute, when Kadidiatou Diani delivered a low cross from the right; Ada Hegerberg's dummy allowed Melchie Dumornay to finish from close range and give Lyon the lead.

PSG responded by committing more players forward, but struggled to create clear scoring opportunities. As the match opened up, OL Lyonnes threatened on the counterattack, with Diani striking the post in the 75th minute and forcing additional saves from Mary Earps. Despite late attacking efforts, PSG were unable to find an equalizer, and the match concluded with OL Lyonnes securing a 1–0 victory.

=== Details ===
14 March 2026
18:30

OL Lyonnes	1–0	Paris Saint-Germain
Dumornay 59'	Report

Felix Houphouet Boigny Stadium, Abidjan, Ivory Coast
Attendance: 27,900
Referee: Émeline Rochebilière

OL Lyonnes	Paris SG

GK	1	(Chile) Christiane Endler
RB	12	(Canada) Ashley Lawrence
CB	3	(France) Wendie Renard (C)		(substituted off) 65'
CB	15	(Norway) Ingrid Syrstad Engen
LB	4	(France) Selma Bacha		(substituted off) 84'
CM	13	(Netherlands) Damaris Egurrola	(yellow card) 50'	(substituted off) 65'
CM	6	(Haiti) Melchie Dumornay
CM	10	(United States) Lindsey Heaps	(yellow card) 23'
RF	11	(France) Kadidiatou Diani		(substituted off) 76'
CF	14	(Norway) Ada Hegerberg		(substituted off) 65'
LF	22	(Malawi) Tabitha Chawinga
Substitutes:
DF	18	(France) Alice Sombath		(substituted on) 65'
MF	20	(United States) Lily Yohannes		(substituted on) 65'
FW	29	(Germany) Jule Brand		(substituted on) 65'
FW	9	(France) Marie-Antoinette Katoto		(substituted on) 76'
DF	33	(Brazil) Tarciane		(substituted on) 84'
Manager:
(Spain) Jonatan Giráldez

GK	27	(England) Mary Earps
RB	5	(France) Élisa De Almeida		(substituted off) 79'
CB	2	(France) Thiniba Samoura
CB	29	(France) Griedge Mbock
CB	77	(Spain) Olga Carmona
LB	20	(France) Tara Elimbi Gilbert		(substituted off) 79'
CM	26	(France) Anaïs Ebayilin	(yellow card) 32'
CM	14	(Netherlands) Jackie Groenen		(substituted off) 65'
CM	7	(France) Sakina Karchaoui (C)	(yellow card) 90+4'
CF	30	(Democratic Republic of the Congo) Merveille Kanjinga	(yellow card) 16'
CF	17	(Netherlands) Romée Leuchter		(substituted off) 65'
Substitutes:
FW	6	(Nigeria) Jennifer Echegini		(substituted on) 65'
FW	10	(Nigeria) Rasheedat Ajibade	(yellow card) 90+6'	(substituted on) 65'
FW	39	(France) Léa Morissaint		(substituted on) 79'
DF	12	(Brazil) Isabela Chagas		(substituted on) 79'
Manager:
(Brazil) Paulo César

Assistant referees:
Mélissa Rossignol
Siham Boudina
Stand-by referee:
Clémence Goncalves
Video assistant referee:
Elisa Daupeux
Assistant video assistant referee:
Maika Vanderstichel

Match rules

- 90 minutes
- Penalty shoot-out if scores level
- Maximum of seven named substitutes
- Maximum of five substitutions
- Maximum of three substitution opportunities
