= 2026 Coupe de France Féminine final =

- Match programme cover
- Event: 2025–26 Coupe de France Féminine
OL Lyonnes	Paris Saint-Germain
Première Ligue	Première Ligue
4	1
- Date: 10 May 2026
- Venue: Stade du Hainaut, Valenciennes
- Referee: Elisa Daupeux
- Attendance: 12,858
- Weather: Partly cloudy 17 °C (63 °F); 60% humidity

The 2026 Coupe de France Féminine final was the final match of the 2025–26 Coupe de France Féminine, the 25th season of France's women's football club knockout cup competition organised by the French Football Federation. The match was played at Le Stade du Hainaut in Valenciennes, Nord, on 10 May 2026, between Première Ligue sides OL Lyonnes and Paris Saint-Germain.

OL Lyonnes defeated last year's finalists to secure a record-extending 11th title.

== Teams ==
Team	Previous finals appearances (bold indicates winners)
OL Lyonnes	17 (2002 (Note: From 2001 to 2004, the team competed as the women's section of FC Lyon, with appearances recorded under that name.), **2003**, **2004**, 2005, 2006, 2007, **2008**, **2012**, **2013**, **2014**, **2015**, **2016**, **2017**, 2018, **2019**, **2020**, **2023**)
Paris Saint-Germain	10 (2008, **2010**, 2014, 2017, **2018**, 2020, **2022**, 2023, **2024**, 2025)

The final was a Classique between the rival and two most successful French club teams, OL Lyonnes and Paris Saint-Germain. The two teams have faced each other six times in the final of the competition, with Lyon coming out on top five times and PSG once.

Lyon, 12-time champions, are back in the final after missing out on the last two occasions. Meanwhile, PSG, the four-time champions, return for their 16th consecutive final after losing last year's final against Paris FC.

== Venue ==
On 17 February 2026, the FFF Executive Committee announced the selection of Le Stade du Hainaut to host the 2026 final.

Valenciennes	2026 Coupe de France Féminine final is located in France
Stade du Hainaut	2026 Coupe de France Féminine final is located in France
Capacity: **25,172**	2026 Coupe de France Féminine final is located in France

== Route to the final ==
Note: In all results below, the score of the finalist is given first (H: home; A: away).

OL Lyonnes		Round	Paris Saint-Germain	
Opponent	Result	Final Phase	Opponent	Result
AS Saint-Étienne	6–0 (A)	Round of 32	LOSC Lille	2–0 (H)
Les Marseillaises	5–1 (A)	Round of 16	Montpellier HSC	5–0 (H)
Le Havre AC	7–0 (H)	Quarter-finals	Dijon FCO	2–1 (A)
RC Strasbourg Alsace	6–0 (A)	Semi-finals	Paris FC	2–1 (H)

== Match ==
=== Summary ===
The final began cautiously, with both OL Lyonnes and Paris Saint-Germain carefully probing for openings. Lyon created the first clear opportunity in the fifth minute when Selma Bacha delivered a corner to the far post, where Vicki Becho volleyed goalward only for the effort to be cleared off the line. The deadlock was broken in the 23rd minute through Melchie Dumornay, who produced an impressive solo run, overpowering and dribbling past several defenders before finishing low past Mary Earps.

Lyon grew in confidence after taking the lead and doubled their advantage in the 35th minute. A flowing move involving Lindsey Heaps and Jule Brand ended with Brand crossing for Becho, whose looping header struck the crossbar before bouncing over the line. Becho scored again five minutes later, meeting another Brand delivery with an outside-of-the-foot volley that flew into the top corner. PSG responded before the interval as Tara Elimbi Gilbert forced a save from Christiane Endler, before Élisa De Almeida headed against the crossbar.

The second half was initially fragmented by fouls and substitutions before substitute Merveille Kanjinga pulled a goal back in the 63rd minute with a powerful volley from a cross by Olga Carmona. PSG nearly reduced the deficit further moments later when substitute Isabela headed narrowly wide from a corner. Lyon, however, restored control in the 74th minute as Heaps converted a long free-kick from Bacha with a first-time volley to make it 4–1. PSG continued to search for another goal, but Endler denied Marie-Estella Lafontaine in a one-on-one chance, allowing Lyon to comfortably see out the remainder of the match and secure the title.

=== Details ===
10 May 2026
15:30

OL Lyonnes (1)	4–1	(1) Paris Saint-Germain
Dumornay 23'; Bècho 35', 40'; Heaps 74'	Report	Kanjinga 63'

Stade du Hainaut, Valenciennes
Attendance: 12,858
Referee: Elisa Daupeux

**OL Lyonnes**	**Paris SG**

GK	1	(Chile) Christiane Endler
DF	12	(Canada) Ashley Lawrence
DF	15	(Norway) Ingrid Syrstad Engen		(substituted off) 86'
DF	3	(France) Wendie Renard (C)
DF	4	(France) Selma Bacha
MF	10	(United States) Lindsey Heaps
MF	20	(United States) Lily Yohannes	(yellow card) 49'	(substituted off) 66'
MF	6	(Haiti) Melchie Dumornay	(yellow card) 70'	(substituted off) 86'
FW	7	(France) Vicki Bècho		(substituted off) 81'
FW	9	(France) Marie-Antoinette Katoto		(substituted off) 66'
FW	29	(Germany) Jule Brand
Substitutes:
MF	8	(United States) Korbin Shrader		(substituted on) 66'
MF	13	(Netherlands) Damaris Egurrola		(substituted on) 66'
DF	18	(France) Alice Sombath		(substituted on) 86'
DF	23	(Denmark) Sofie Svava		(substituted on) 86'
DF	33	(Brazil) Tarciane		(substituted on) 81'
GK	16	(France) Féerine Belhadj
FW	22	(Malawi) Tabitha Chawinga
Manager:
(Spain) Jonatan Giráldez

GK	27	(England) Mary Earps
DF	5	(France) Élisa De Almeida
DF	2	(France) Thiniba Samoura		(substituted off) 65'
DF	29	(France) Griedge Mbock Bathy
DF	77	(Spain) Olga Carmona
MF	26	(France) Anaïs Ebayilin		(substituted off) 81'
MF	6	(Nigeria) Jennifer Echegini
MF	7	(France) Sakina Karchaoui (C)
FW	10	(Nigeria) Rasheedat Ajibade	(yellow card) 53'
FW	17	(Netherlands) Romée Leuchter		(substituted off) 62'
FW	20	(France) Tara Elimbi Gilbert		(substituted off) 46'
Substitutes:
FW	30	(Democratic Republic of the Congo) Merveille Kanjinga		(substituted on) 46'
FW	47	(France) Marie-Estella Lafontaine		(substituted on) 62'
DF	12	(Brazil) Isabela Chagas		(substituted on) 65'
MF	8	(Brazil) Vitória Yaya		(substituted on) 81'
GK	1	(Poland) Katarzyna Kiedrzynek
DF	4	(Poland) Paulina Dudek
MF	11	(Canada) Florianne Jourde
Manager:
(Brazil) Paulo César

Assistant referees:
Clémentine Dubreil
Violette Le Chevert
Fourth official:
Agathe Kocher
Video assistant referee:
Marc Bollengier
Assistant video assistant referee:
Morgane Chignard

**Match rules**

- 90 minutes
- Penalty shoot-out if scores level
- Maximum of seven named substitutes
- Maximum of five substitutions
