= Lindsey Heaps =

American football player (born 1994)

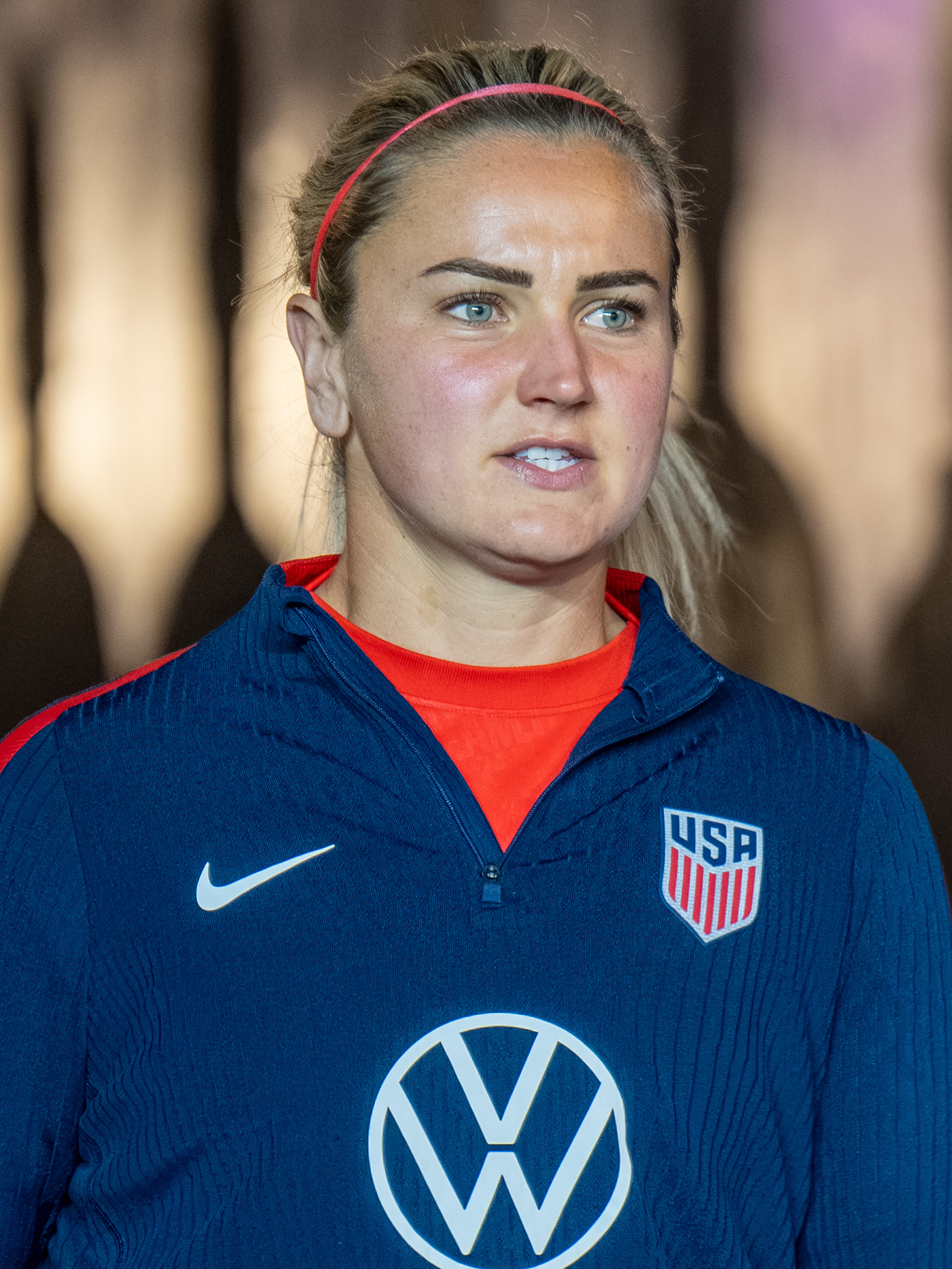
- Heaps with the United States in 2025

Personal information
- Full name: Lindsey Michelle Heaps
- Birth name: Lindsey Michelle Horan
- Date of birth: May 26, 1994 (age 32)
- Place of birth: Golden, Colorado, U.S.
- Height: 5 ft 9 in (1.75 m)
- Position: Midfielder

Team information
- Current team: Denver Summit
- Number: 10

Youth career
- 2005–2012: Colorado Rush

Senior career*
Years	Team	Apps	(Gls)
2012	Colorado Rush	3	(2)
2012–2016	Paris Saint-Germain	58	(46)
2016–2021	Portland Thorns	87	(25)
2022	→ Lyon (loan)	5	(0)
2022–2026	Lyon	62	(29)
2026–	Denver Summit	13	(7)

International career^{‡}
	United States U-17	17	(15)
	United States U-20	24	(26)
2013–	United States	180	(40)
Medal record
Women's soccer
Representing United States
Olympic Games
Gold medal – first place	2024 Paris	Team
Bronze medal – third place	2020 Tokyo	Team
FIFA Women's World Cup
Gold medal – first place	2019 France	Team
CONCACAF W Championship
Winner	2018 United States
Winner	2022 Mexico
CONCACAF W Gold Cup
Winner	2024 United States
CONCACAF Women's U-20 Championship
Winner	2014 Cayman Islands
- * Club domestic league appearances and goals as of 06:37, November 8, 2026 (UTC) ‡ National team caps and goals as of October 13, 2026

Lindsey Michelle Heaps (née Horan; /həˈræn/ hə-RAN; born May 26, 1994) is an American professional soccer player who plays as a midfielder for Denver Summit FC of the National Women's Soccer League (NWSL) and captains the United States national team.

Heaps began her career with Paris Saint-Germain in France at age 18 in 2012, emerging as a prolific scorer. In 2016, she joined the NWSL's Portland Thorns and helped lead the team to two NWSL Shields and the NWSL Championship in 2017, scoring the winning goal in the final. She was a four-time NWSL Best XI selection and was named the NWSL Most Valuable Player in 2018. After six years in Portland, she joined French powerhouse Lyon in 2022, initially on loan, and won the UEFA Women's Champions League in her debut season. After winning five league titles in five seasons at Lyon, she returned to the NWSL with hometown team Denver Summit in 2026.

Heaps made her senior debut for the United States and was named the U.S. Soccer Young Female Player of the Year in 2013. She was part of the team that won the 2019 FIFA Women's World Cup, won bronze at the 2020 Tokyo Olympics, and captained the team to win gold at the 2024 Paris Olympics. She was named the U.S. Soccer Female Player of the Year in 2021.

== Early life ==
Heaps was born May 26, 1994, and grew up in Golden, Colorado, near Denver. Although she attended Golden High School, she did not play soccer for the school. Instead, she played club soccer with the Colorado Rush. She first started playing for the Colorado Edge during the U-11 tryouts. In March, when Heaps was 15 years old and was one of the youngest players on the United States under-17 women's national team, she scored 12 goals in nine games (a team-best) leading up to the North American/Central American/Caribbean U-17 tournament in Costa Rica. During her sophomore year at Golden, she was named to the Parade Magazine High School All-American team although she didn't play high school soccer.

In 2012, Heaps was named the top-ranked college prospect by ESPN. Although she had a scholarship to play for Tar Heels of the University of North Carolina at Chapel Hill starting in the 2012 season, Heaps bypassed her college career and signed with French club Paris Saint-Germain (PSG).

== Club career ==
=== Colorado Rush ===
Heaps played for the Colorado Rush in the 2012 USL W-League season. She played three games for the team, scoring two goals and taking 19 shots. Her performance for the Rush against Seattle Sounders Women on June 1, 2012, in which Heaps scored a goal against Seattle and USWNT goalkeeper Hope Solo, impressed several national team players who also played for Seattle. After the match, Megan Rapinoe called Heaps "a hell of a player".

=== Paris Saint-Germain ===
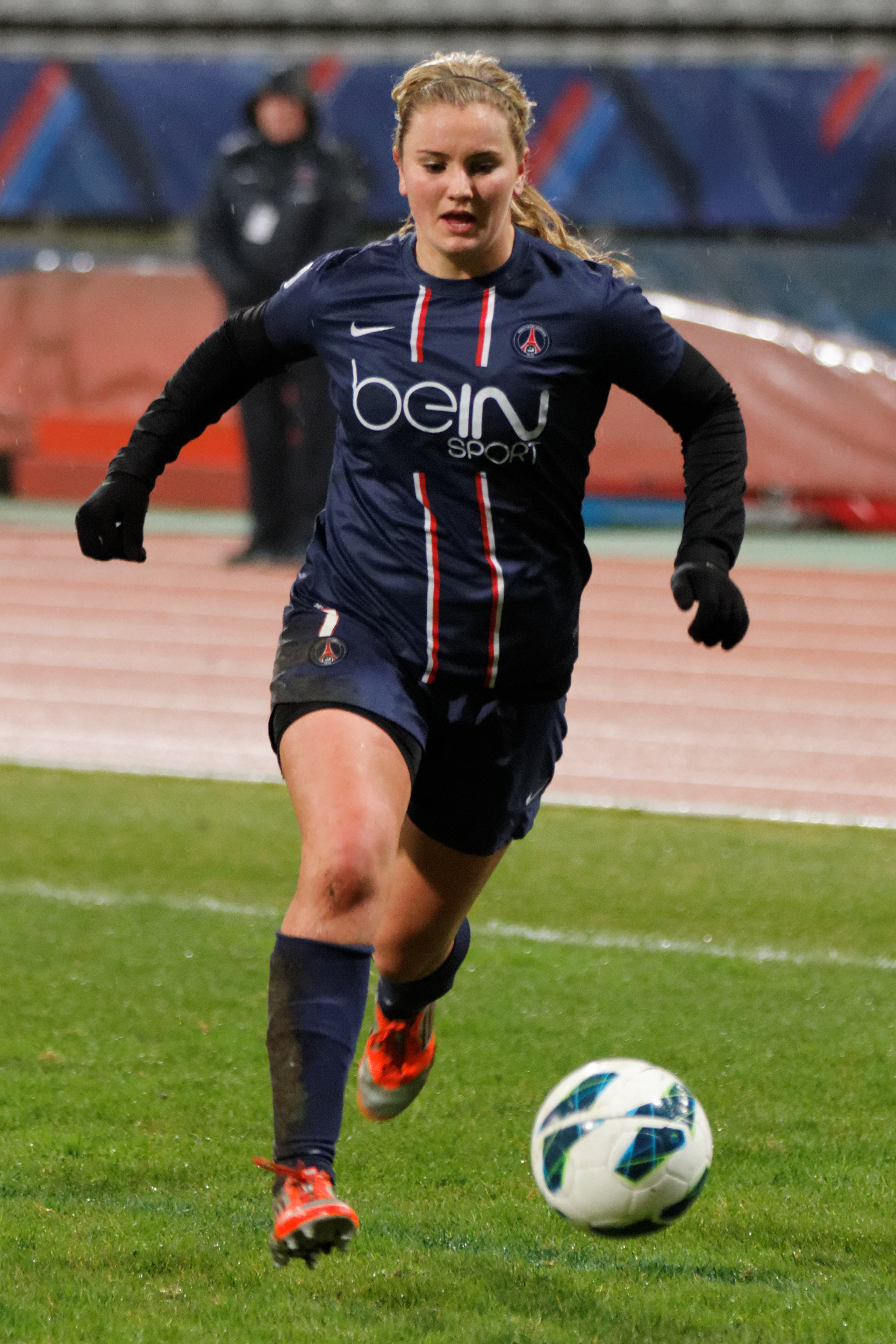
Heaps with PSG in 2013

In July 2012, 18-year-old Heaps signed a six-figure deal with the professional French club Paris Saint-Germain (PSG), giving up her college eligibility. On September 23, she made her professional debut for the club, scoring in a 5–0 win over Saint-Étienne. On January 30, 2013, she scored her first professional hat trick as PSG routed second-tier Montigny in their Coupe de France Féminine opener. She finished her debut season with 20 goals, including 17 in the league, leading PSG in scoring alongside Kosovare Asllani, as the club placed second in the league behind Lyon.

The following season, Heaps made her UEFA Women's Champions League debut on October 9, 2013, in the round of 32 first leg against Swedish club Tyresö, but PSG lost 2–1 thanks to two goals by Christen Press. On May 10, 2014, she scored a goal in a 6–0 Paris derby win in the Coupe de France semifinals, helping send PSG to the final where they lost to Lyon. She finished the season as PSG's second-leading scorer behind Marie-Laure Delie with 16 goals, including 14 in the league.

On October 15, 2014, Heaps scored her first Champions League goal in a 1–0 win over Dutch club Twente in the round of 32 second leg. The next month, she helped PSG oust rivals Lyon from the Champions League round of 16. She then underwent surgery early the next year and missed the rest of the season as PSG reached the Champions League final. She had scored 10 goals through half a season.

On January 4, 2016, PSG announced Heaps's contract had been terminated to allow her to return to the United States. She played her final game on December 5, 2015, a 5–0 win over Juvisy, scoring the opening goal. Heaps scored 46 goals in 58 appearances for PSG.

=== Portland Thorns ===
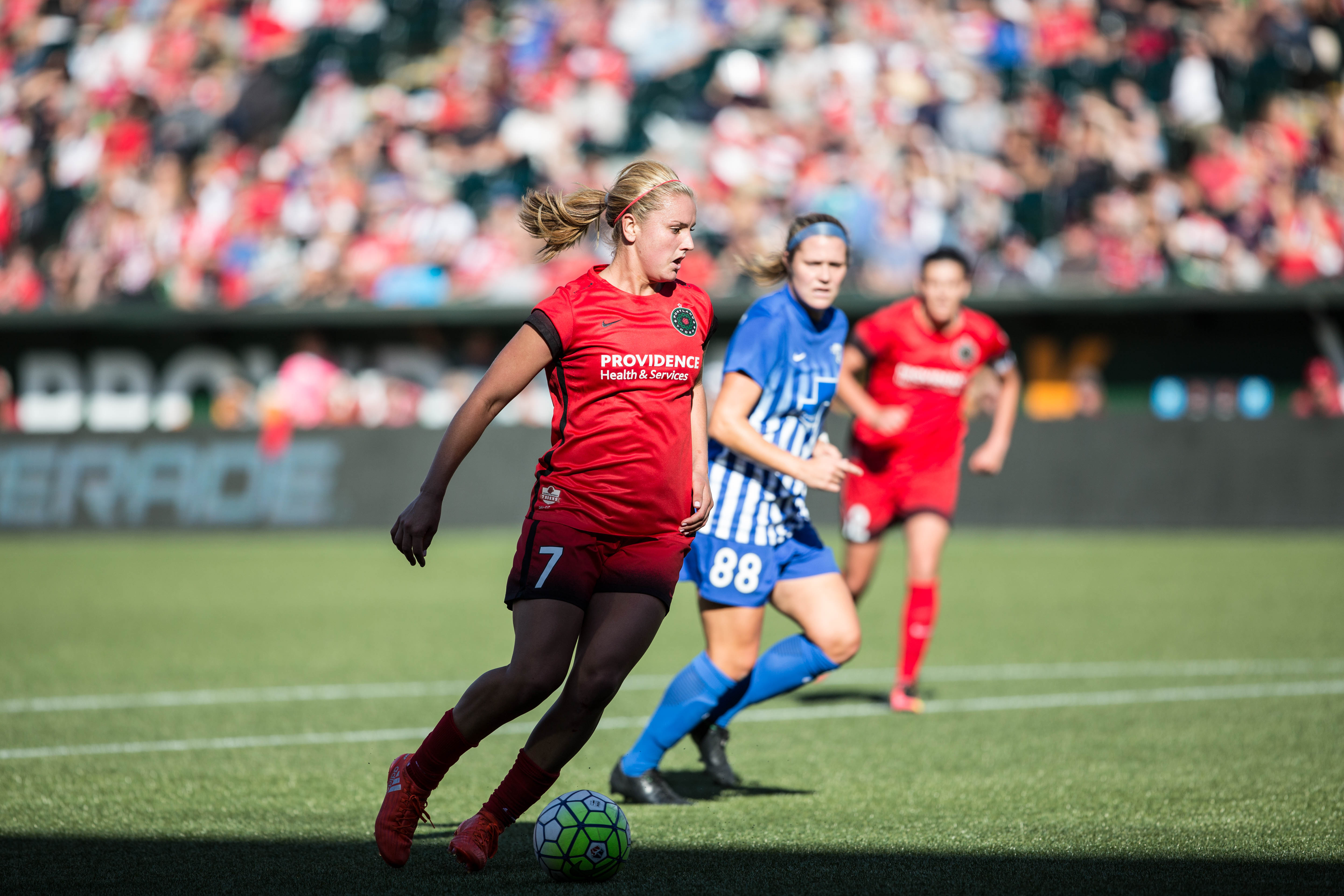
Heaps with the Thorns in 2016

On January 13, 2016, Heaps signed with Portland Thorns FC of the National Women's Soccer League (NWSL). Unlike her role at PSG, Heaps played for Portland in central midfield in a position similar to her national team role. She made her NWSL debut on April 17, scoring the 2–1 winner in Portland's season opener against the Orlando Pride. On September 25, she scored in the 3–1 regular-season finale win over Sky Blue as the Thorns clinched the NWSL Shield with the best record in the league. The following week, she made her playoff debut and scored in extra time in a 4–3 defeat to eventual champions Western New York Flash. She finished the season with 6 goals in 16 appearances in all competitions.

The following season, Heaps started all 26 games and scored 5 goals for the Thorns as she won her first NWSL championship. On June 3, 2017, she scored twice in a 2–0 win over Sky Blue FC, earning NWSL Player of the Week. In the playoffs, after placing second in the table, she recorded an assist to Hayley Raso in the 4–1 semifinal win over the Orlando Pride. She then scored the only goal in Portland's 1–0 win over the North Carolina Courage in the final and was named NWSL Championship MVP. She was also named to the NWSL Second XI at the end of the season.

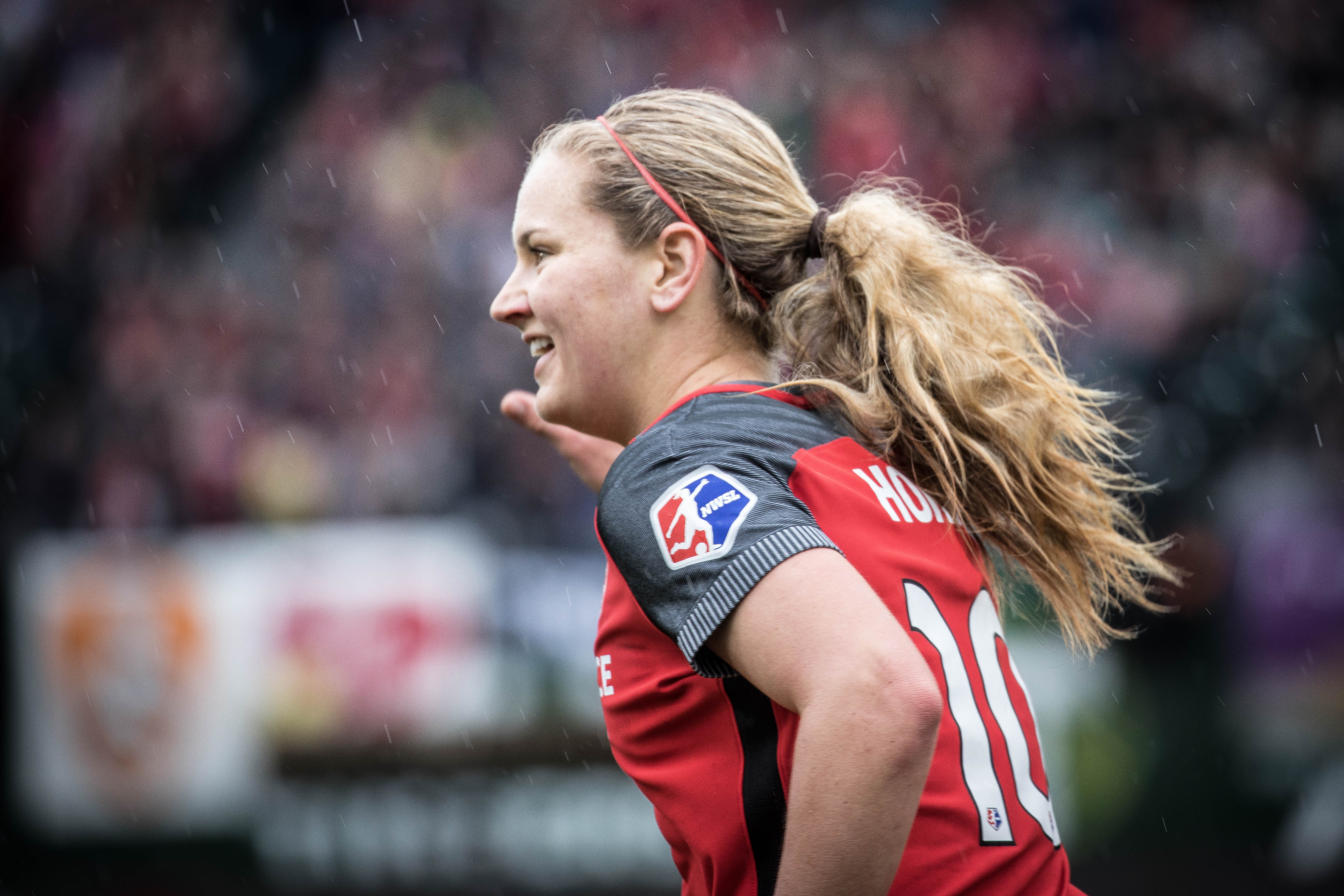
Heaps with the Thorns in 2018

In 2018, Heaps started 24 games and led the Thorns with 14 goals, ranking third on the regular-season scoring chart with 13. She was named NWSL Player of the Month for July 2018 after she scoring three goals to help the Thorns to a 3–0–0 record. On September 7, she scored twice in a 3–1 comeback win over rivals Seattle Reign on the last day of the season, clinching a home playoff game and winning NWSL Player of the Week. In the playoffs, she recorded a goal and an assist in a 2–1 semifinal win over the Reign, helping send the Thorns back into the final, which they lost 3–0 to the North Carolina Courage. Following the season, she was named to the NWSL Best XI and was named the NWSL Most Valuable Player.

In 2019, Heaps was named to the NWSL Best XI for the second consecutive year despite missing much of the season while at the 2019 FIFA Women's World Cup. She played in 14 games and scored 1 goal as the Thorns placed third in the league, losing 1–0 to the Chicago Red Stars in the playoff semifinals. In 2020, she was a key player in helping the Thorns win the NWSL Fall Series and the associated Community Shield, though the COVID-19 pandemic limited her to 8 games and 2 goals.

On April 21, 2021, Heaps made her first appearance of the season and scored from a free kick in a 2–0 win over the Seattle Reign in the NWSL Challenge Cup group stage. Two weeks later, she won the Challenge Cup final against NJ/NY Gotham FC, converting in the 6–5 penalty shootout after a 1–1 draw. She finished the season with 3 goals in 17 appearances in all competitions as the Thorns won the NWSL Shield for the second time. She missed Portland's playoff semifinal due to an eye injury, where the Thorns lost 2–0 to the Chicago Red Stars. She was named to the NWSL Second XI at the end of the season, receiving her fourth NWSL Best XI selection.

=== Lyon ===
On January 27, 2022, Heaps returned to France on loan with continental powerhouse Olympique Lyonnais. On February 6, she made her debut for Lyon in a 1–0 win over Bordeaux. On May 21, she played the full match in the Champions League final as Lyon won 3–1 against defending champions Barcelona, securing the club's eighth European title. Heaps and teammate Catarina Macario became the fourth and fifth Americans to win the UEFA Women's Champions League. She made 10 appearances in her debut season as Lyon won their record-extending 15th league title.

On September 18, 2022, Heaps scored her first goal for Lyon in a 2–1 victory over Soyaux. On October 27, she scored her first Champions League goal for the club as they drew 1–1 with Juventus in the group stage. On March 17, 2023, she opened the scoring against Fleury in a 2–0 win in the Coupe de France Féminine semifinals, helping send Lyon to the final (which they won 2–1 over Paris Saint-Germain). Later that month, she assisted Vanessa Gilles to level the Champions League quarterfinal tie against Chelsea, which ended 2–2 on aggregate. However, the defending champions were eliminated on penalties after Heaps took the final shot and had it saved. She made 27 appearances and scored 8 goals during the season as Lyon defended the league title. She was named to the UNFP Team of the Season after the season.

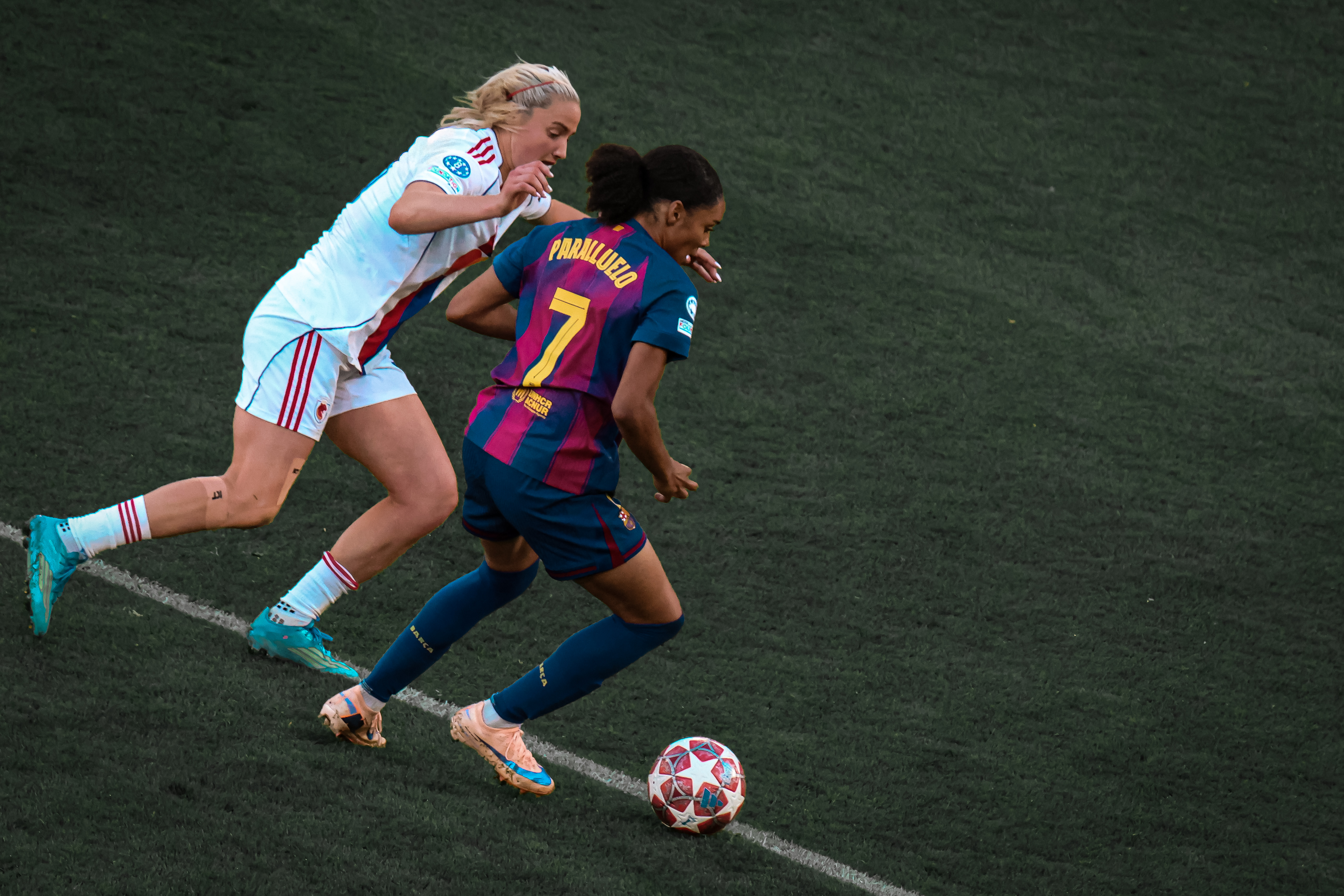
Heaps with Lyon in 2026

On June 22, 2023, the Thorns permanently transferred Heaps to Lyon for a fee of €250,000 (US$274,000) with a conditional bonus of an additional €50,000 (US$54,750). On October 14, she scored her first hat trick for Lyon in a 6–0 league victory over Saint-Étienne. On March 27, 2024, she provided two assists in a 4–1 win over Benfica in the second leg of the Champions League quarterfinals. On May 12, she provided two assists against Reims in the new league playoff semifinals, before winning her third consecutive league title after beating PSG in the final. Lyon also reached the Champions League final but lost 2–0 to Barcelona. She finished the season with 7 goals in 27 appearances in all competitions and was named in the UNFP and FFF D1 Arkema Teams of the Season, also earning a nomination for their Player of the Year awards.

On November 16, 2024, Heaps scored her second hat trick for Lyon in the first 35 minutes, also against Saint-Étienne. Lyon reached the Champions League semifinals but were eliminated by eventual champions Arsenal. On May 11, 2025, she scored in the league playoff semifinals against Dijon as Lyon went on to their fourth consecutive league title. She ended the season with 13 goals in 28 appearances in all competitions, also leading the league with 8 assists, and was named in the UNFP and LFFP Teams of the Season.

Heaps made 35 appearances and scored 6 goals in her final season with Lyon. On May 10, 2026, she scored the last goal in the Coupe de France final against PSG, securing her tenth title with Lyon in all competitions after a 4–1 win. The next week, she scored against Nantes in the league playoff semifinals. On May 23, she played in her third Champions League final but lost 4–0 to Barcelona. On May 29, she played her final match for Lyon as they won 5–0 against Paris FC in the league final, securing a fifth consecutive championship.

=== Denver Summit ===
On January 12, 2026, NWSL expansion team Denver Summit FC announced the signing of Heaps on a three-and-a-half-year contract, the player returning to her home state after the end of her Lyon season.

== International career ==
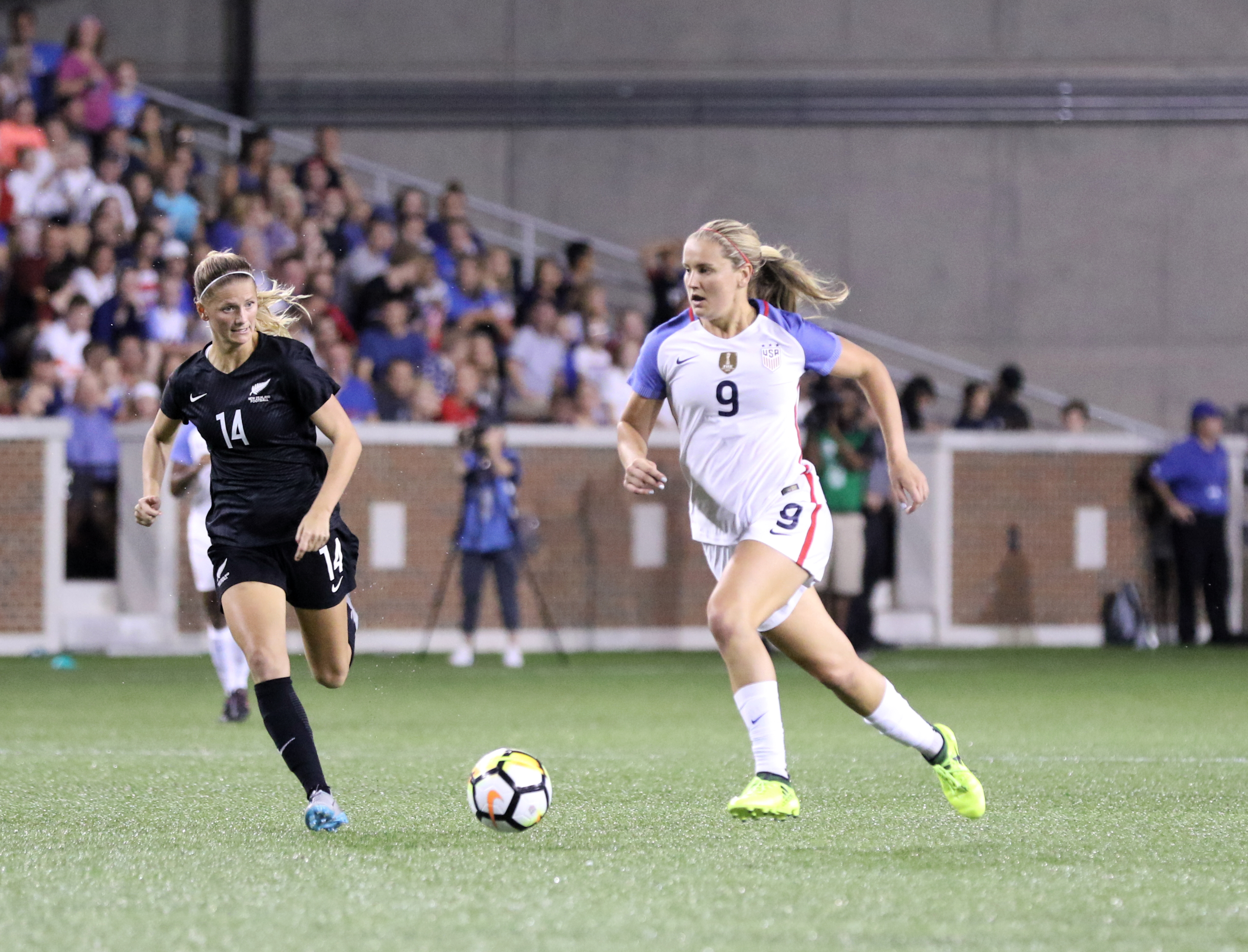
Heaps (right) with the national team in 2017

Heaps played for the United States women's national under-17 soccer team and was the leading scorer for the team at the 2010 CONCACAF Women's U-17 Championship. She helped the United States women's national under-20 soccer team win the 2012 CONCACAF Women's U-20 Championship in March by scoring four goals, including a hat trick against Guatemala in the group stage. Heaps was unable to play in the 2012 FIFA U-20 Women's World Cup because of a knee injury that required surgery.

In February 2013, at the age of eighteen, she was named to the senior team roster for the 2013 Algarve Cup. She earned her first cap for the senior team during a group stage match against China at the Algarve on March 8, 2013. Heaps was called up to the senior roster near the end of 2015, and scored her first goal for the senior team during a 'Woman of the Match' performance against Trinidad & Tobago in December 2015. She was on the roster for the 2016 CONCACAF Women's Olympic Qualifying Championship and started the opening group stage match against Costa Rica in central midfield. While Heaps played successfully as a striker during her time at PSG (2012–16), with 46 goals in 56 appearances, she played in central midfield after her return to the national team in 2016.

Heaps was called up for the 2019 FIFA Women's World Cup, scoring her first World Cup goal in the opening game against Thailand on June 11. On January 31, 2020, she scored her first career hat-trick, against Panama in the 2020 CONCACAF Women's Olympic Qualifying Championship, in addition to assisting goals scored by Lynn Williams and Tobin Heath.

On July 24, 2021, Heaps played her 100th match for the USWNT, and scored a goal in a 6–1 win over New Zealand in the 2020 Summer Olympics.

At the 2023 FIFA Women's World Cup, Heaps scored in the U.S.'s opening match against Vietnam. This gave her goals in successive World Cups. Heaps also scored in the U.S.'s match against the Netherlands, tying the game 1–1.

Heaps was selected to the 18-player roster for the 2024 Summer Olympics in France. She started and captained the team in all six USWNT matches, including the final, in which the team defeated Brazil 1–0 to win the gold medal.

== Personal life ==
Heaps married soccer analyst Tyler Heaps on December 28, 2024. They met when he was working for U.S. Soccer; he is now the sporting director and general manager for San Diego FC of Major League Soccer. Heaps began using her married name in 2025 for international matches; however, she continued to use her maiden name with Lyon through the remainder of the 2024–25 campaign since the Première Ligue does not allow name changes mid-season. Heaps started using her married name ahead of the 2025–26 season. As a child she idolised Lionel Messi and got to meet him during a coin toss in the MLS match between Inter Miami and San Diego on September 20, 2026.

== Career statistics ==
=== Club ===
Club	Season	League					Cup (Note: Includes Coupe de France Féminine, 2020 NWSL Challenge Cup, 2020 NWSL Fall Series, and 2021 NWSL Challenge Cup)		Continental (Note: Appearances in UEFA Women's Champions League and 2021 Women's International Champions Cup)		Total	
Club	Season	Division	Regular Season		Play-offs		Cup		Continental		Total	
Club	Season	Division	Apps	Goals	Apps	Goals	Apps	Goals	Apps	Goals	Apps	Goals
Colorado Rush	2012	USL W-League	3	2	—		—				3	2
Colorado Rush	Total		3	2	—		—				3	2
Paris Saint-Germain	2012–13	Division 1 Féminine	20	17	—		5	3	—		25	20
Paris Saint-Germain	2013–14	Division 1 Féminine	18	14	—		3	2	2	0	23	16
Paris Saint-Germain	2014–15	Division 1 Féminine	11	9	—		0	0	4	1	15	10
Paris Saint-Germain	2015–16	Division 1 Féminine	9	6	—		0	0	4	2	13	8
Paris Saint-Germain	Total		58	46	—		8	5	10	3	76	54
Portland Thorns FC	2016	NWSL	15	5	1	1	—				16	6
Portland Thorns FC	2017	NWSL	24	4	2	1	—				26	5
Portland Thorns FC	2018	NWSL	22	13	2	1	—				24	14
Portland Thorns FC	2019	NWSL	13	1	1	0	—				14	1
Portland Thorns FC	2020	NWSL	— (Note: 2020 regular season and playoffs cancelled due COVID-19 pandemic)				8	2	—		8	2
Portland Thorns FC	2021	NWSL	13	2	0	0	3	1	1	0	17	3
Portland Thorns FC	Total		87	25	6	3	11	3	1	0	105	31
Lyon (loan)	2021–22	Première Ligue	5	0	—		0	0	5	0	10	0
Lyon	2022–23	Première Ligue	14	5	1	0	4	1	8	2	27	8
Lyon	2023–24	Première Ligue	15	6	1	0	2	1	9	0	27	7
Lyon	2024–25	Première Ligue	17	14	0	0	1	0	10	2	28	16
Lyon	2025–26	Première Ligue	16	4			8	2	11	0	35	7
Lyon	Total		67	29	2	0	15	4	43	4	123	37
Denver Summit FC	2026	NWSL	0	0	—		—		—		0	0
Career total			215	102	8	3	34	12	54	7	311	124

=== International ===
As of match played October 13, 2026

Appearances and goals by national team and year
National team	Year	Apps	Goals
United States	2013	2	0
United States	2014	0	0
United States	2015	4	1
United States	2016	24	2
United States	2017	13	1
United States	2018	19	3
United States	2019	16	5
United States	2020	8	7
United States	2021	22	6
United States	2022	14	1
United States	2023	17	5
United States	2024	22	5
United States	2025	9	2
United States	2026	10	2
Total		180	40

==== International goals ====
Scores and results list the United States' goal tally first, score column indicates score after each Heaps goal.

List of international goals scored by Lindsey Heaps
No.	Date	Venue	Opponent	Score	Result	Competition	Ref.
1	December 10, 2015	San Antonio, Texas	Trinidad and Tobago	6–0	6–0	Friendly	
2	February 21, 2016	Houston, Texas	Canada	1–0	2–0	Olympic qualifier: Final	
3	June 2, 2016	Commerce City, Colorado	Japan	3–2	3–3	Friendly	
4	September 19, 2017	Cincinnati, Ohio	New Zealand	1–0	5–0	Friendly	
5	April 8, 2018	Houston, Texas	Mexico	2–2	6–2	Friendly	
6	July 29, 2018	East Hartford, Connecticut	Australia	1–1	1–1	2018 Tournament of Nations	
7	October 10, 2018	Cary, North Carolina	Trinidad and Tobago	5–0	7–0	World Cup qualifier: Group A	
8	April 7, 2019	Los Angeles, California	Belgium	3–0	6–0	Friendly	
9	June 11, 2019	Reims, France	Thailand	3–0	13–0	World Cup: Group F	
10	June 20, 2019	Le Havre, France	Sweden	1–0	2–0	World Cup: Group F	
11	August 3, 2019	Pasadena, California	Republic of Ireland	2–0	3–0	Friendly	
12	September 3, 2019	St. Paul, Minnesota	Portugal	3–0	3–0	Friendly	
13	January 28, 2020	Houston, Texas	Haiti	3–0	4–0	Olympic qualifier: Group A	
14	January 31, 2020	Houston, Texas	Panama	1–0	8–0	Olympic qualifier: Group A	
15	January 31, 2020	Houston, Texas	Panama	3–0	8–0	Olympic qualifier: Group A	
16	January 31, 2020	Houston, Texas	Panama	8–0	8–0	Olympic qualifier: Group A	
17	February 4, 2020	Houston, Texas	Costa Rica	2–0	6–0	Olympic qualifier: Group A	
18	February 9, 2020	Carson, California	Canada	2–0	3–0	Olympic qualifier: Final	
19	March 11, 2020	Frisco, Texas	Japan	3–1	3–1	2020 SheBelieves Cup: Final	
20	January 22, 2021	Orlando, Florida	Colombia	5–0	6–0	Friendly	
21	June 13, 2021	Houston, Texas	Jamaica	2–0	4–0	Friendly	
22	July 5, 2021	East Hartford, Connecticut	Mexico	1–0	4–0	Friendly	
23	July 24, 2021	Saitama, Japan	New Zealand	2–0	6–1	Olympics: Group G	
24	October 26, 2021	Saint Paul, Minnesota	South Korea	1–0	6–0	Friendly	
25	November 27, 2021	Sydney, Australia	Australia	3–0	3–0	Friendly	
26	September 3, 2022	Kansas City, Kansas	Nigeria	2–0	4–0	Friendly	
27	April 8, 2023	Austin, Texas	Republic of Ireland	2–0	2–0	Friendly	
28	July 22, 2023	Auckland, New Zealand	Vietnam	3–0	3–0	World Cup: Group E	
29	July 27, 2023	Wellington, New Zealand	Netherlands	1–1	1–1	World Cup: Group E	
30	October 29, 2023	San Diego, California	Colombia	2–0	3–0	Friendly	
31	December 2, 2023	Fort Lauderdale, Florida	China	2–0	3–0	Friendly	
32	February 23, 2024	Carson, California	Argentina	4–0	4–0	CONCACAF W Gold Cup	
33	March 3, 2024	Los Angeles, California	Colombia	1–0	3–0	CONCACAF W Gold Cup	
34	March 10, 2024	San Diego, California	Brazil	1–0	1–0	CONCACAF W Gold Cup	
35	April 6, 2024	Atlanta, Georgia	Japan	2–1	2–1	2024 SheBelieves Cup	
36	October 27, 2024	Nashville, Tennessee	Iceland	2–1	3–1	Friendly	
37	April 5, 2025	Inglewood, California	Brazil	2–0	2–0	Friendly	
38	May 31, 2025	Saint Paul, Minnesota	China	3–0	3–0	Friendly	
39	March 4, 2026	Nashville, Tennessee	Argentina	1–0	2–0	2026 SheBelieves Cup	
40	April 11, 2026	San Jose, California	Japan	2–0	2–1	Friendly	

== Honors ==
Portland Thorns FC

- NWSL Championship: 2017
- NWSL Shield: 2016, 2021
- NWSL Community Shield: 2020
- NWSL Challenge Cup: 2021
- Women's International Champions Cup: 2021

OL Lyonnes

- Première Ligue: 2021–22, 2022–23, 2023–24 2024–25, 2025–26
- UEFA Women's Champions League: 2021–22
- Coupe de France Féminine: 2022–23, 2025–26
- Trophée des Championnes: 2022
- Women's International Champions Cup: 2022
- Coupe LFFP: 2025–26

United States U20

- CONCACAF Women's U-20 Championship: 2014

United States

- FIFA Women's World Cup: 2019
- Summer Olympic Games Gold Medal: 2024
- Summer Olympic Games Bronze Medal: 2020
- CONCACAF Women's Championship: 2018; 2022
- CONCACAF W Gold Cup: 2024
- CONCACAF Women's Olympic Qualifying Tournament: 2016; 2020
- SheBelieves Cup: 2016; 2018; 2020; 2021; 2023,2024, 2026
- Tournament of Nations: 2018

Individual

- U.S. Soccer Female Player of the Year: 2021
- U.S Soccer Young Female Player of the Year: 2013
- NWSL Most Valuable Player: 2018
- NWSL Best XI: 2018, 2019
- NWSL Second XI: 2017, 2021
- NWSL Championship Most Valuable Player: 2017
- Arkema D1 Team of the Season: 2023–24 2024–25
- UNFP D1 Arkema Best XI: 2023, 2024 2025
- UEFA Women's Champions League Team of the Season: 2023–24
- CONCACAF Women's Olympic Qualifying Tournament Best XI: 2020
- CONCACAF W Gold Cup Best XI: 2024
- Arkema Première Ligue Player of the Month: September 2024
- The Best FIFA Women's 11: 2024
- ESPN FC Women's Rank: #17 on the 2024 list of 50 best women's soccer players 2024
- IFFHS Women's World Team: 2024
