= Sandrine Brétigny =

French footballer (born 1984)

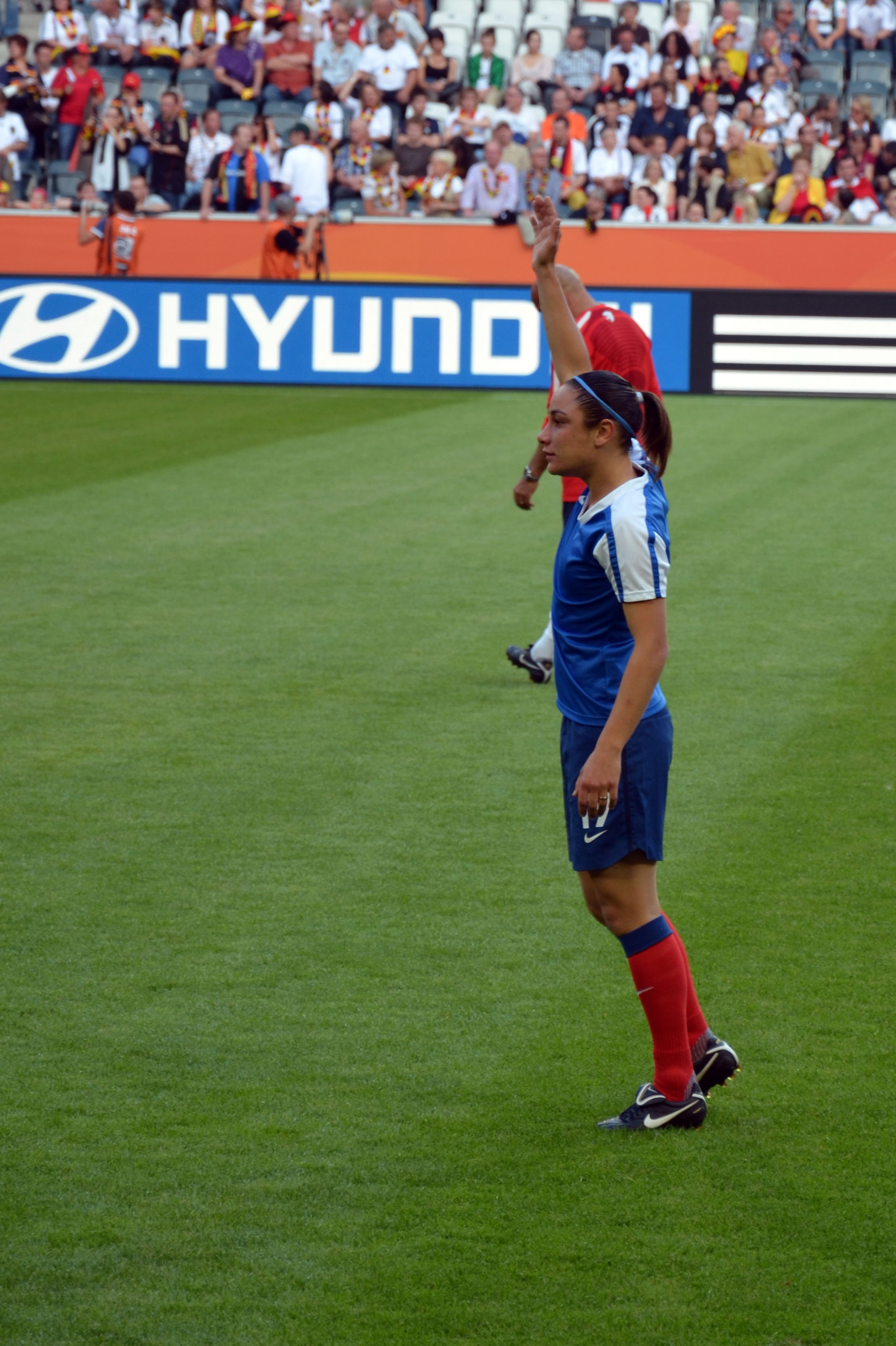
- Brétigny playing for France in 2011

Personal information
- Full name: Sandrine Brétigny
- Date of birth: 2 July 1984 (age 42)
- Place of birth: Le Creusot, France
- Height: 1.63 m (5 ft 4 in)
- Position: Striker

Team information
- Current team: Bastia

Youth career
- 1994–1997: Moncenis
- 1997–2000: Sanvignes-les-Mines
- 2000–2001: FC Lyon

Senior career*
| Years | Team | Apps | (Gls) |
| 2001–2012 | Lyon | 197 | (179) |
| 2012–2013 | 1. FFC Frankfurt | 14 | (6) |
| 2013–2015 | FCF Juvisy | 39 | (21) |
| 2015–2018 | Marseille | 47 | (29) |
| 2018-2019 | Grenoble | 23 | (14) |
| 2019- | Bastia | 0 | (0) |

International career^{‡}
| 2005–2006 | France U21 | 4 | (1) |
| 2006–2011 | France | 22 | (9) |
- * Club domestic league appearances and goals as of 16 September 2016 ‡ National team caps and goals as of 16 September 2016

Sandrine Brétigny (born 2 July 1984) is a French footballer who currently plays for the French club Bastia. She plays as a striker and is known for her goalscoring output.

== Career ==
Brétigny began her career with FC Lyon and remained with the club during it transformation to Olympique Lyonnais. Despite having solid seasons with Lyon previously, including leading the league in goals scored in 2003, it wasn't until the 2006–07 season where she gained recognition for being a feared striker when she scored 48 goals in 25 matches helping the club win their first title under the Olympique Lyonnais emblem. The following season, she would again impress scoring five goals in one match against Toulouse FC (the final result was 10–0). She would proceed to accomplish this feat again on 9 November 2008 in a match against FCF Hénin-Beaumont, though the final result was lowered to an 8–0 victory.

In July 2012, after over a decade with Lyon, Brétigny joined German club 1. FFC Frankfurt. She was the only player to remain from the squad of FC Lyon when, in 2003, the club was transformed to Olympique Lyonnais.

In 2013, she returned to the Division 1 Féminine by joining Juvisy.

In 2015, she joined Olympique de Marseille in the Division 2 Féminine.

== International career ==
Despite having some individual success earlier in her career, Brétigny made her international debut for the Bleues on 22 November 2006 in a match against Belgium. She currently has nine goals from 22 caps.

== Career statistics ==
=== Club ===
As of 1 September 2016

| Club | Season | League | | Cup | | Continental | | Total | |
| Club | Season | Apps | Goals | Apps | Goals | Apps | Goals | Apps | Goals |
|---|---|---|---|---|---|---|---|---|---|
| Lyon | 2000–01 | 1 | 0 | – | – | – | – | 1 | 0 |
| Lyon | 2001–02 | 19 | 5 | 2 | 0 | – | – | 21 | 5 |
| Lyon | 2002–03 | 21 | 26 | 1 | 2 | – | – | 23 | 28 |
| Lyon | 2003–04 | 16 | 11 | 1 | 1 | – | – | 17 | 12 |
| Lyon | 2004–05 | 18 | 8 | 1 | 1 | – | – | 19 | 9 |
| Lyon | 2005–06 | 19 | 11 | 1 | 0 | – | – | 20 | 11 |
| Lyon | 2006–07 | 21 | 42 | 1 | 0 | – | – | 22 | 42 |
| Lyon | 2007–08 | 22 | 25 | 4 | 3 | 7 | 4 | 33 | 32 |
| Lyon | 2008–09 | 21 | 22 | 3 | 2 | 5 | 3 | 29 | 27 |
| Lyon | 2009–10 | 17 | 9 | 4 | 6 | 2 | 1 | 23 | 16 |
| Lyon | 2010–11 | 19 | 19 | 3 | 6 | 6 | 1 | 28 | 26 |
| Lyon | 2011–12 | 2 | 1 | 1 | 2 | 2 | 0 | 5 | 3 |
| Lyon | Total | 197 | 179 | 22 | 23 | 22 | 9 | 241 | 211 |
| Frankfurt | 2012–13 | 14 | 6 | 1 | 0 | – | – | 15 | 6 |
| Frankfurt | Total | 14 | 6 | 1 | 0 | – | – | 15 | 6 |
| Juvisy | 2013–14 | 18 | 9 | 1 | 0 | – | – | 19 | 9 |
| Juvisy | 2014–15 | 21 | 12 | 2 | 1 | – | – | 23 | 13 |
| Juvisy | Total | 39 | 21 | 3 | 1 | – | – | 42 | 22 |
| Marseille | 2015–16 | 20 | 23 | – | – | – | – | 20 | 23 |
| Marseille | Total | 20 | 23 | – | – | – | – | 20 | 23 |
| Career total | | 270 | 229 | 26 | 24 | 22 | 9 | 318 | 262 |

=== International ===
As of 1 September 2016

| National team | Season | Apps | Goals |
|---|---|---|---|
| France | 2006–07 | 3 | 0 |
| France | 2007–08 | 6 | 7 |
| France | 2008–09 | 2 | 0 |
| France | 2009–10 | 5 | 1 |
| France | 2010–11 | 3 | 1 |
| France | 2010–11 | 1 | 0 |
| France | 2010–11 | 2 | 0 |
| France | 2010–11 | 0 | 0 |
| Total | | 22 | 9 |

==== International goals ====
| Goal | Date | Venue | Opponent | Score | Result | Competition |
|---|---|---|---|---|---|---|
| 1 | 1 October 2007 | Mitsubishi Forklift Stadion, Almere, Netherlands | Netherlands | 0–2 | 1–4 | Friendly |
| 2 | 1 October 2007 | Mitsubishi Forklift Stadion, Almere, Netherlands | Netherlands | 0–3 | 1–4 | Friendly |
| 3 | 27 October 2007 | Stadion Kralj Petar I, Belgrade, Serbia | Serbia | 0–4 | 0–8 | UEFA Women's Euro 2009 qualifying |
| 4 | 8 March 2008 | Stade Mohamed V, Casablanca, Morocco | Morocco | 0–5 | 0–6 | Friendly |
| 5 | 8 March 2008 | Stade Mohamed V, Casablanca, Morocco | Morocco | 0–6 | 0–6 | Friendly |
| 6 | 8 May 2008 | Stade Fred Aubert, Saint-Brieuc, France | Serbia | 1–0 | 2–0 | UEFA Women's Euro 2009 qualifying |
| 7 | 8 May 2008 | Stade Fred Aubert, Saint-Brieuc, France | Serbia | 2–0 | 2–0 | UEFA Women's Euro 2009 qualifying |
| 8 | 12 August 2009 | Stade des Grands Prés, Chartres, France | Scotland | 4–0 | 4–0 | Friendly |
| 9 | 18 June 2011 | Stade de l'Épopée, Calais, France | Belgium | 7–0 | 7–0 | Friendly |

== Honours ==
=== Club ===
Lyon

- Division 1 Féminine (6): 2006–07, 2007–08, 2008–09, 2009–10, 2010–11, 2011–12
- Challenge de France (4): 2002–03, 2003–04, 2007–08, 2011–12
- UEFA Women's Champions League (2): 2010–11, 2011–12
