= Coupe LFFP =

French football tournament

- Founded: 2025; 1 year ago
- Region: France
- Teams: 24
- Current champions: OL Lyonnes (1st title)
- Most championships: OL Lyonnes (1 title)
- Broadcaster: L'Équipe (final only)
- 2026–27 Coupe LFFP

The Coupe de la Ligue féminine de football professionnel (abbreviated as Coupe LFFP), internationally referred to as the French Women's League Cup, is a league cup competition in French women's association football. Established in January 2025, the tournament is organised by the LFFP. Unlike the Coupe de France Féminine, participation in the competition is restricted to clubs from the Première Ligue and Seconde Ligue.

== History ==
In January 2025, nearly one year after its establishment, the Ligue féminine de football professionnel announced the creation of a new competition under the presidency of Jean-Michel Aulas. The tournament was initially intended for clubs from the Première and Seconde Ligue that were not participating in European competitions that season.

In May 2025, the format was confirmed to also include the top three clubs engaged in European competition, with the inaugural final scheduled to be held in Abidjan, Ivory Coast.

== Format ==
The three clubs that qualified for European competitions receive a bye to the first round. The remaining 9 clubs from the Première Ligue and all 12 clubs from the Seconde Ligue (21 in total) are divided into five groups of four or five teams. Each team plays the others once. The winners of each group advance to the quarter-finals, where they are joined by the clubs participating in Europe. The competition then proceeds with semi-finals followed by the final.

== List of finals ==
Coupe LFFP winners
Season	Winners	Score	Runners-up	Venue	Attendance
2025–26	OL Lyonnes	1–0	Paris Saint-Germain	Felix Houphouet Boigny Stadium, Abidjan (Ivory Coast)	27,900
2026–27					

== See also ==
- Coupe de France féminine
- Coupe de la Ligue (defunct)
