= Alice Sombath =

French footballer (born 2003)

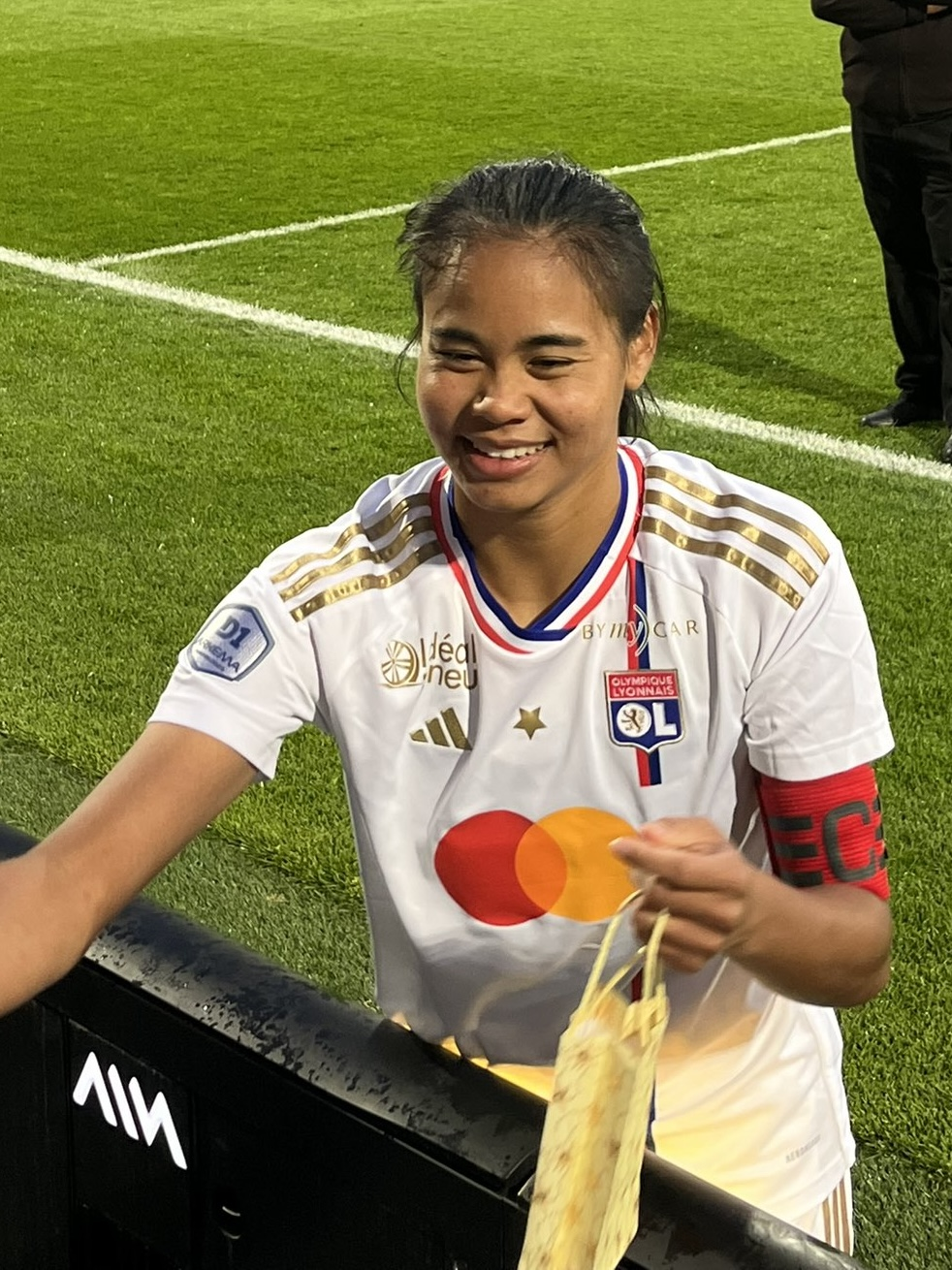
- Sombath in 2024

Personal information
- Full name: Alice Dauphine Sombath
- Date of birth: 16 October 2003 (age 23)
- Place of birth: Charenton-le-Pont, France
- Height: 1.65 m (5 ft 5 in)
- Position: Right-back

Team information
- Current team: Tottenham Hotspur
- Number: 5

Youth career
- 2011–2013: CSOM Arcueil
- 2013–2017: Paris FC
- 2017–2020: Paris Saint-Germain
- 2020–2022: Lyon

Senior career*
Years	Team	Apps	(Gls)
2021–2026	Lyon	71	(2)
2023	Lyon B	2	(0)
2026–	Tottenham Hotspur	0	(0)

International career^{‡}
2019	France U16	6	(0)
2019	France U17	3	(0)
2021–2022	France U19	5	(0)
2021–2022	France U20	11	(0)
2022–2025	France U23	15	(0)
2024–	France	17	(0)
Medal record
Women's football
Representing France
UEFA Women's Nations League
Third place	2025
- * Club domestic league appearances and goals as of 08:27, 21 July 2026 (UTC) ‡ National team caps and goals as of 10 October 2026

Alice Dauphine Sombath (French: [a.lis do.fin]; Thai: อลิซ โดฟีน สมบัติ, pronounced [sǒm.bàt]; born 16 October 2003) is a French professional footballer who plays as a right-back for Women's Super League club Tottenham Hotspur and the France national team.

== Early life ==
Sombath was born on 16 October 2003 in Val-de-Marne, France to Thai parents. She has an older brother.

== Youth career ==
In 2011, Sombath began her youth career at CSOM Arcueil. Age 10, she joined the academy setup of Paris FC. Sombath then joined Paris Saint-Germain's academy, where she became a pillar of the U19 team and won the Championnat National Féminin U19 in 2019.

== Club career ==
=== Lyon, 2020–26 ===
In 2020, Sombath, alongside PSG and French international teammate Vicki Bècho, was recruited by Lyon; the approach by a rival team was said to upset PSG's then-sporting director Leonardo. Upon arriving at Lyon, Sombath, age 16, signed her first professional contract.

Sombath began her time at Lyon as part of the academy team before transitioning into the senior squad ahead of the 2021–22 Division 1 Féminine season. With Lyon, she won five consecutive Prémiere Ligue titles and one UEFA Women's Champions League. She is the first player of Thai heritage to win the Women's Champions League.

=== Tottenham Hotspur, 2026– ===
In July 2026, Sombath joined Women's Super League club Tottenham Hotspur for an undisclosed fee.

== International career ==
Sombath began her international career with the France under-16 team when she won the Montaigu Tournament in 2019. She represented her country at all age levels from under-16 to under-23.

In November 2024, Sombath made her senior international debut against Nigeria.

== Career statistics ==
=== International ===
As of match played 10 October 2026

Appearances and goals by national team and year
National team	Year	Apps	Goals
France	2024	1	0
France	2025	10	0
France	2026	6	0
Total		17	0

== Honours ==
Paris Saint-Germain

- Championnat National Féminin U19: 2018–19

Lyon

- Première Ligue: 2021–22, 2022–23, 2023–24, 2024–25 2025–26
- Coupe de France Féminine: 2022–23, 2025–26
- Coupe LFFP: 2025–26
- Trophée des Championnes: 2022
- UEFA Women's Champions League: 2021–22

Individual

- LFFP Première Ligue team of the season: 2025–26
