= Ligue féminine de football professionnel =

French national women's association football organization

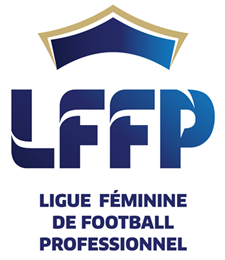
- Formation: 29 April 2024; 2 years ago
- Type: Sports association
- Region served: France
- Members: 24 football clubs
- President: Jean-Michel Aulas
- Main organ: General Assembly

The Ligue féminine de football professionnel is a sports association responsible for administering the two women's professional football leagues in France, the Première Ligue and Seconde Ligue.
