= 2026–27 OL Lyonnes season =

OL Lyonnes
2026–27 season
- President: Michele Kang
- Head coach: Jonatan Giráldez
- Stadium: Groupama OL Training Center
- Première Ligue: 1st
- Coupe de France: Preseason
- UEFA Champions League: League phase
- Top goalscorer: League: Melchie Dumornay (9); All: Melchie Dumornay (11)
Home colours	Away colours	Third colours

The 2026–27 OL Lyonnes season was the club's twenty-second season since FC Lyon joined OL as its women's section.

== Season events ==
On 12 June, OL Lyonnes announced the singing of Maria Luisa Grohs from Bayern Munich on a contract until the summer of 2027.

On 16 June, OL Lyonnes announced the singing of Caroline Weir from Real Madrid on a contract until the summer of 2029.

On 19 June, OL Lyonnes announced that Romane Rafalski had signed her first professional contract with the club, until 30 June 2029.

On 25 June, OL Lyonnes announced that Ambre Ouazar had signed her first professional contract with the club, until 30 June 2028.

On 30 June, OL Lyonnes announced that Maïssa Fathallah had extended her contract with the club until 30 June 2029.

On 6 July, OL Lyonnes announced the signing of Johanna Rytting Kaneryd from Chelsea, on a contract until 30 June 2029.

On 10 July, OL Lyonnes announced that Julie Swierot had extended her contract with the club until 30 June 2029.

On 15 July, OL Lyonnes announced that Kadidiatou Diani had left the club to sign for London City Lionesses, and that Kysha Sylla had left the club to sign for Juventus.

On 18 July, OL Lyonnes announced that Sofie Svava had left the club to sign for Como 1907.

On 21 July, OL Lyonnes announced that Alice Sombath had left the club to sign for Tottenham Hotspur.

On 25 July, OL Lyonnes announced the signing of Salma Paralluelo, who'd recently left Barcelona at the end of her contract, on a contract until 30 June 2030.

On 28 July, OL Lyonnes announced that Maeline Mendy had joined Paris FC on a permanent transfer after having spent the previous season on loan at the club.

On 3 September, OL Lyonnes announced that they had extended their contract with Wassa Sangaré until 30 June 2029.

On 10 September, OL Lyonnes announced that they had extended their contract with Elma Junttila Nelhage until 30 June 2029.

On 28 October, Sofia Bekhaled joined OGC Nice on loan until 30 June 2027.

== Squad ==
As of match played 14 November 2026

No.	Name	Nationality	Position	Date of birth (age)	Signed from	Signed in	Contract ends	Apps.	Goals
Goalkeepers
1	Christiane Endler	(Chile)	GK	23 July 1991 (age 35)	Paris Saint-Germain	2021	2027	157	0
16	Feerine Belhadj	(France)	GK	14 February 2005 (age 21)	Academy	2023	2027	11	0
21	Teagan Micah	(Australia)	GK	20 October 1997 (age 29)	Unattached	2025		6	0
25	Maria Luisa Grohs	(Germany)	GK	13 June 2001 (age 25)	Bayern Munich	2026	2027	7	0
Defenders
3	Wendie Renard (captain)	(France)	DF	20 July 1990 (age 36)	Academy	2006	2027	540	172
4	Selma Bacha	(France)	DF	9 November 2000 (age 26)	Academy	2017	2030	228	10
5	Elma Junttila Nelhage	(Sweden)	DF	21 May 2003 (age 23)	BK Häcken	2025	2029	21	1
12	Ashley Lawrence	(Canada)	DF	11 June 1995 (age 31)	Chelsea	2025	2028	37	1
15	Ingrid Syrstad Engen	(Norway)	DF	29 April 1998 (age 28)	Barça Femení	2025	2027	40	1
26	Wassa Sangaré	(France)	DF	16 March 2006 (age 20)	Academy	2023	2029	13	0
28	Romane Rafalski	(France)	DF	3 March 2007 (age 19)	Academy	2024	2029	6	1
33	Tarciane	(Brazil)	DF	27 May 2003 (age 23)	Houston Dash	2025	2029	44	5
Midfielders
6	Melchie Dumornay	(Haiti)	MF	17 August 2003 (age 23)	Stade de Reims	2023	2030	93	62
8	Korbin Shrader	(United States)	MF	13 October 2003 (age 23)	Paris Saint-Germain	2025	2028	43	12
10	Inès Benyahia	(France)	MF	26 March 2003 (age 23)	Academy	2020	2028	60	10
13	Damaris Egurrola	(Netherlands)	MF	26 August 1999 (age 27)	Everton	2021	2027	165	11
17	Maïssa Fathallah	(France)	MF	9 April 2009 (age 17)	Academy	2025	2029	7	0
20	Lily Yohannes	(United States)	MF	12 June 2007 (age 19)	AFC Ajax	2025	2028	46	9
23	Caroline Weir	(Scotland)	MF	20 June 1995 (age 31)	Real Madrid	2026	2029	3	1
24	Julie Swierot	(France)	MF	14 March 2006 (age 20)	Academy	2023	2029	11	1
27	Ambre Ouazar	(France)	MF	9 April 2007 (age 19)	Academy	2023	2028	2	0
30	Giovanna Waksman	(Brazil)	MF	21 March 2009 (age 17)	Unattached	2026	2028	0	0
36	Elida Kolbjørnsen	(Norway)	MF	8 August 2008 (age 18)	Stabæk	2025	2028	0	0
Forwards
7	Vicki Bècho	(France)	FW	3 October 2003 (age 23)	Paris Saint-Germain	2020	2027	133	32
9	Marie-Antoinette Katoto	(France)	FW	1 November 1998 (age 28)	Paris Saint-Germain	2025	2029	51	30
11	Tabitha Chawinga	(Malawi)	FW	22 May 1996 (age 30)	Wuhan Jianghan University	2024	2027	68	27
14	Ada Hegerberg	(Norway)	FW	10 July 1995 (age 31)	Turbine Potsdam	2014	2027	317	296
19	Johanna Rytting Kaneryd	(Sweden)	FW	12 February 1997 (age 29)	Chelsea	2026	2029	0	0
29	Jule Brand	(Germany)	FW	16 October 2002 (age 24)	VfL Wolfsburg	2025	2028	50	9
31	Liana Joseph	(France)	FW	15 August 2006 (age 20)	Academy	2023	2029	14	5
77	Salma Paralluelo	(Spain)	FW	13 November 2003 (age 23)	Unattached	2026	2030	11	3
Academy
35	Jade Derigent	(France)	DF	14 September 2009 (age 17)	Academy	2026		1	0
37	Oceane Tranchant	(France)	MF	27 June 2008 (age 18)	Academy	2026		1	0
38	Sarah Rougeron	(France)	DF	19 June 2006 (age 20)	Academy	2024		2	0
39	Charline Coutel	(France)	MF	12 June 2006 (age 20)	Academy	2024		3	0
40	Lorna Douvier	(France)	MF	11 February 2006 (age 20)	Academy	2024		3	0
41	Kelya Figueira	(France)	FW	28 April 2008 (age 18)	Academy	2026		1	0
43	Camille Marmillot	(France)	FW	23 July 2008 (age 18)	Academy	2025		2	1
45	Alexane Lambert	(Switzerland)	GK	2 October 2008 (age 18)	Academy	2025		0	0
56	Lou Marchal	(France)	GK	3 January 2007 (age 19)	Academy	2025		1	0
	Aalyah Samadi	(Comoros)	MF	1 May 2007 (age 19)	Academy	2024		1	0
Out on loan
	Sofia Bekhaled	(Algeria)	FW	26 October 2006 (age 20)	Academy	2023	2029	3	0
Left during the season
11	Kadidiatou Diani	(France)	FW	1 April 1995 (age 31)	Paris Saint-Germain	2023	2027	95	43
18	Alice Sombath	(France)	DF	16 October 2003 (age 23)	Paris Saint-Germain	2020	2027	106	2
19	Kysha Sylla	(France)	DF	4 February 2004 (age 22)	Academy	2021	2027	9	0
23	Sofie Svava	(Denmark)	DF	11 August 2000 (age 26)	Real Madrid	2024	2027	49	3
32	Maeline Mendy	(France)	MF	26 December 2006 (age 19)	Academy	2023	2028	7	2

== Transfers ==
=== In ===
Date	Position	Nationality	Name	From	Fee	Ref.
12 June 2026 (Note: Transfer announced on the shown date, becoming official on 1 July 2025.)	GK	(Germany)	Maria Luisa Grohs	Bayern Munich	Undisclosed	
16 June 2026	MF	(Scotland)	Caroline Weir	Real Madrid	Free	
6 July 2026	MF	(Sweden)	Johanna Rytting Kaneryd	Chelsea	Undisclosed	
25 July 2026	FW	(Spain)	Salma Paralluelo	Unattached	Free	

=== Out ===
Date	Position	Nationality	Name	To	Fee	Ref.
15 July 2026	DF	(France)	Kysha Sylla	Juventus	Undisclosed	
15 July 2026	FW	(France)	Kadidiatou Diani	London City Lionesses	Undisclosed	
18 July 2026	DF	(Denmark)	Sofie Svava	Como 1907	Undisclosed	
21 July 2026	DF	(France)	Alice Sombath	Tottenham Hotspur	Undisclosed	
28 July 2026	MF	(France)	Maeline Mendy	Paris FC	Undisclosed	

=== Loans out ===
Start date	Position	Nationality	Name	To	End date	Ref.
28 October 2026	MF	(Algeria)	Sofia Bekhaled	OGC Nice	30 June 2027	

== Friendlies ==
8 August 2026	OL Lyonnes	1–1	Real Sociedad	Décines-Charpieu
11:00 CEST (UTC+2)	Brand 64'	Report	Aparicio 35'	Stadium: Groupama OL Training Center
Note: Match played behind closed doors.

16 August 2026	Eintracht Frankfurt	2–1	OL Lyonnes	Herzogenaurach, Germany
13:00 CEST (UTC+2)	Mühlhaus 76'; Memeti 86'	Report	Yohannes (yellow card) 9'; Bècho 79'	Stadium: Adidas Campus

21 August 2026	OL Lyonnes	3–1	Aston Villa	Herzogenaurach, Germany
11:00 CEST (UTC+2)	Brand 50'; Katoto 76', 82'	Report	Deslandes 39'	Stadium: Adidas Campus

29 August 2026	OL Lyonnes	4–0	London City Lionesses	Décines-Charpieu
CEST (UTC+2)	Weir 38', 42'; Dumornay 47', 63'	Report		Stadium: Groupama OL Training Center

== Competitions ==
=== Overview ===
Competition	First match	Last match	Starting round	Record							
Competition	First match	Last match	Starting round	Pld	W	D	L	GF	GA	GD	Win %
Première Ligue	4 September 2026		Matchday 1	9	9	0	0	49	6	+43	100.00
Coupe de France			Round of 32	0	0	0	0	0	0	+0	—
UEFA Champions League	23 September 2026		League phase	4	3	1	0	20	0	+20	75.00
Total				13	12	1	0	69	6	+63	92.31

Last updated: 14 November 2026
Source: Competitions

=== Première Ligue ===
==== Regular season ====
===== Table =====
Pos	Team	Pld	W	D	L	GF	GA	GD	Pts	Qualification or relegation
1	Lyon	10	10	0	0	54	8	+46	30	Qualification for the play-offs
2	Paris Saint-Germain	10	8	1	1	17	6	+11	25	Qualification for the play-offs
3	Paris FC	9	7	1	1	23	11	+12	22	Qualification for the play-offs
4	Marseille	10	4	4	2	12	15	−3	16	Qualification for the play-offs
5	Nantes	10	4	3	3	14	11	+3	15	

Updated to match(es) played on 22 November 2026. Source: FFF.fr
Rules for classification: 1) points; 2) head-to-head points; 3) head-to-head goal difference; 4) goal difference; 5) goals scored

===== Results summary =====
Overall								Home						Away					
Pld	W	D	L	GF	GA	GD	Pts	W	D	L	GF	GA	GD	W	D	L	GF	GA	GD
10	10	0	0	54	8	+46	30	5	0	0	23	3	+20	5	0	0	31	5	+26

Last updated: 22 November 2026.

===== Results by matchday =====
Matchday	1	2	3	4	5	6	7	8	9	10
Ground	A	H	A	H	A	H	A	A	H	H
Result	W	W	W	W	W	W	W	W	W	W
Position	1	1	1	1	1	1	1	1	1	1

Updated to match(es) played on 22 November 2026. Source: Results
A = Away; H = Home; W = Win; D = Draw; L = Loss; P = Postponed

===== Results =====
4 September 2026 1	Fleury	1–7	OL Lyonnes	Bondoufle
21:00 CEST (UTC+2)	Chossenotte 9'; Blanc (yellow card) 42'; Meffometou (yellow card) 87'	Report	Tarciane 3'; Dumornay 11', 41', 45+2'; Goetsch 28' (o.g.); Bècho 31'; Swierot 71'	Stadium: Stade Robert Bobin; Referee: Maika Vanderstichel

12 September 2026 2	OL Lyonnes	7–1	Paris FC	Décines-Charpieu
13:30 CEST (UTC+2)	Bacha (yellow card) 4'; Katoto 41', 60'; Dumornay 45', 76', (yellow card) 49'; Hegerberg 63', 71', 90+2'; Yohannes (yellow card) 88'	Report	Mateo 70'; Jedlińska (yellow card) 73'	Stadium: Parc Olympique Lyonnais; Referee: Élisa Daupeux

18 September 2026 3	Le Havre	1–8	OL Lyonnes	Le Havre
19:00 CEST (UTC+2)	Nankya (yellow card) 52'; Gallais 64'; Mendy (yellow card) 69'	Report	Le Guilly 12' (o.g.); Hegerberg 32', 53'; Dumornay 43'; Benhaia 45+2'; Nankya 55' (o.g.); Brand 58'; Paralluelo 78'	Stadium: Stade Océane; Referee: Charlène Laur

3 October 2026 4	OL Lyonnes	5–0	Toulouse	Décines-Charpieu
18:00 CEST (UTC+2)	Benyahia 3'; Hegerberg 28'; Chaŵinga 35'; Joseph 76'; Weir 84'	Report	Gay (yellow card) 26'; Jumere (yellow card) 30'; Grinfan (yellow card) 53'; Gavory (yellow card) 68'	Stadium: Parc Olympique Lyonnais; Referee: Romy Fournier

17 October 2026 5	Paris Saint-Germain	0–4	OL Lyonnes	Paris
21:00 CEST (UTC+2)	Karchaoui (yellow card) 54'	Report	Dumornay 3'; Katoto 39'; Bècho 48'; Paralluelo 59'; Egurrola (yellow card) 90'	Stadium: Parc des Princes; Referee: Alexandra Collin

24 October 2026 6	OL Lyonnes	5–0	Les Marseillaises	Décines-Charpieu
21:00 CEST (UTC+2)	Paralluelo 4' (yellow card) 45'; Dumornay 26', 31'; Sangaré (yellow card) 27'; Hegerberg 40', 70'	Report	Fonseca (yellow card) 23'; Lavogez (yellow card) 56'	Stadium: Parc Olympique Lyonnais; Referee: Audrey Gerbel

31 October 2026 7	Montpellier	2–5	OL Lyonnes	Montpellier
18:00 CET (UTC+1)	Palis 7'; Chabod (yellow card) 17' (yellow-red card) 32'; Kharafi 75'; Bourgouin (yellow card) 85'	Report	Joseph (yellow card) 28'; Bècho (yellow card) 45'; Katoto 50', 61'; Shrader 56'; Skurcenski 83' (o.g.); Dumornay 85' (yellow card) 90'	Stadium: Bernard Gasset Stadium; Referee: Clémence Goncalves

7 November 2026 8	RC Lens	1–7	OL Lyonnes	Lens
18:00 CET (UTC+1)	Rossi 29'; Gelders (yellow card) 73'; Yeboah (yellow card) 78'	Report	Egurrola 3'; Dumornay 5' (yellow card) 26'; Katoto 13', 20'; Tarciane (yellow card) 43'; Yohannes 45'; Hegerberg (yellow card) 81' (goal) 89'; Renard 90'	Stadium: Stade François-Blin; Referee: Morgane Chignard

14 November 2026 9	OL Lyonnes	1–0	US Saint-Malo	Décines-Charpieu
18:00 CET (UTC+1)	Nelhage (red card) 24'; Bècho (yellow card) 46'; Hegerberg 61'	Report	Kouache (yellow card) 45'; Charpentier (yellow card) 53'; Aubert (yellow card) 86'	Stadium: Parc Olympique Lyonnais; Referee: Romy Fournier

22 November 2026 10	OL Lyonnes	5–2	Strasbourg Alsace	Décines-Charpieu
15:00 CET (UTC+1)	Tarciane 5'; Joseph 30'; Hegerberg 33'; Swierot 60'; Katoto (yellow card) 90+5'	Report	Pinther 62', 90+2'	Stadium: Parc Olympique Lyonnais; Referee: Maika Vanderstichel

=== Coupe de France ===
2026	–
CEST (UTC+2)

=== UEFA Champions League ===
==== League phase ====
Pos	Team	Pld	W	D	L	GF	GA	GD	Pts	Qualification
1	(Royal Spanish Football Federation) Barcelona (Q)	5	4	1	0	26	3	+23	13	Advance to the quarter-finals (seeded)
2	(French Football Federation) OL Lyonnes (Q)	5	4	1	0	22	0	+22	13	Advance to the quarter-finals (seeded)
3	(German Football Association) Bayern Munich (T)	5	3	2	0	13	5	+8	11	Advance to the quarter-finals (seeded)
4	(The Football Association) Chelsea (T)	5	3	2	0	4	0	+4	11	Advance to the quarter-finals (seeded)
5	(The Football Association) Manchester City (T)	5	2	3	0	10	5	+5	9 (Note: Ranked based on away goals scored, Manchester City 8, Real Madrid 3)	Advance to the knockout phase play-offs (seeded)
6	(Royal Spanish Football Federation) Real Madrid (T)	5	2	3	0	10	5	+5	9	Advance to the knockout phase play-offs (seeded)
7	(Italian Football Federation) Juventus (T)	5	3	0	2	10	9	+1	9	Advance to the knockout phase play-offs (seeded)
8	(The Football Association) Arsenal (T)	5	2	2	1	7	5	+2	8	Advance to the knockout phase play-offs (seeded)
9	(Italian Football Federation) Roma	5	2	1	2	5	11	−6	7	Advance to the knockout phase play-offs (unseeded)
10	(Portuguese Football Federation) Benfica	5	2	0	3	7	11	−4	6	Advance to the knockout phase play-offs (unseeded)
11	(French Football Federation) Paris Saint-Germain	5	1	2	2	8	5	+3	5	Advance to the knockout phase play-offs (unseeded)
12	(French Football Federation) Paris FC	5	1	2	2	7	12	−5	5	Advance to the knockout phase play-offs (unseeded)
13	(Danish Football Association) HB Køge	5	1	1	3	7	13	−6	4	
14	(Italian Football Federation) Inter Milan	5	1	1	3	4	14	−10	4	
15	(Swiss Football Association) Servette Chênois	5	1	0	4	7	22	−15	3	
16	(Swedish Football Association) BK Häcken	5	0	2	3	1	7	−6	2	
17	(Royal Belgian Football Association) OH Leuven	5	0	2	3	2	13	−11	2	
18	(Austrian Football Association) Austria Wien (E)	5	0	1	4	3	13	−10	1	

Updated to match(es) played on 19 November 2026. Source: UEFA
Rules for classification: League phase tiebreakers
(E) Eliminated; (Q) Qualified for the phase indicated; (T) Qualified, but not yet for the particular phase indicated
Notes:

23 September 2026 1	Servette Chênois (Switzerland)	0–8	(France) OL Lyonnes	Lancy, Switzerland
18:45 CEST (UTC+2)	Muratović (yellow card) 30'; Bourma (yellow card) 65'; Terchoun (yellow card) 74'	Report	Ballesté 8' (o.g.); Katoto 28', 40', 47'; Dumornay 45+1', 54'; Sobal 68' (o.g.); Benyahia 89'	Stadium: Stade de Genève; Attendance: 5,762; Referee: Michaela Pachtová (Czech Republic)

30 September 2026 2	OL Lyonnes (France)	0–0	(England) Chelsea	Décines-Charpieu, France
21:00 CEST (UTC+2)	Brand (yellow card) 50'; Tarciane (yellow card) 54'	Report	Potter (yellow card) 27'	Stadium: Parc Olympique Lyonnais; Attendance: 7,324; Referee: Marta Huerta de Aza (Spain)

28 October 2026 3	OL Lyonnes (France)	6–0	(Italy) Inter Milan	Décines-Charpieu, France
21:00 CET (UTC+1)	Katoto 18', 45'; Yohannes 59'; Bècho 69', 76', 90+4'	Report	Tomašević (yellow card) 83'	Stadium: Parc Olympique Lyonnais; Attendance: 8,118; Referee: Lotta Vuorio (Finland)

11 November 2026 4	Juventus (Italy)	0–6	(France) OL Lyonnes	Biella, Italy
21:00 CET (UTC+1)	Lenzini (yellow card) 83'	Report	Katoto 31', 35'; Dumornay 40'; Yohannes 80' (yellow card) 90+4'; Shrader 85'; Renard (penalty missed) 90' 90+1'	Stadium: Stadio Vittorio Pozzo; Attendance: 718; Referee: Emanuela Rusta (Albania)

19 November 2026 5	Arsenal (England)	0–2	(France) OL Lyonnes	Borehamwood, England
21:00 CET (UTC+1)	Baum (yellow card) 60'; Stanway (yellow card) 85'	Report	Egurrola (yellow card) 23'; Brand 24'; Dumornay 57'	Stadium: Meadow Park; Attendance: 2,317; Referee: Silvia Gasperotti (Italy)

16 December 2026 6	OL Lyonnes (France)	–	(Sweden) BK Häcken	Décines-Charpieu, France
21:00 CET (UTC+1)		Report		Stadium: Parc Olympique Lyonnais

== Squad statistics ==
As of match played 14 November 2026

=== Appearances ===
No.	Pos	Nat	Player	Total		Première Ligue		Coupe de France		UEFA Champions League	
No.	Pos	Nat	Player	Apps	Goals	Apps	Goals	Apps	Goals	Apps	Goals
1	GK	(Chile) CHI	Christiane Endler	5	0	5	0	0	0	0	0
3	DF	(France) FRA	Wendie Renard	8	2	3+2	1	0	0	2+1	1
4	DF	(France) FRA	Selma Bacha	13	0	4+5	0	0	0	4	0
5	DF	(Sweden) SWE	Elma Junttila Nelhage	3	0	2+1	0	0	0	0	0
6	MF	(Haiti) HAI	Melchie Dumornay	12	14	6+2	11	0	0	4	3
7	FW	(France) FRA	Vicki Bècho	12	5	5+4	2	0	0	1+2	3
8	MF	(United States) USA	Korbin Shrader	9	2	5+3	1	0	0	0+1	1
9	FW	(France) FRA	Marie-Antoinette Katoto	11	14	4+3	7	0	0	4	7
10	MF	(France) FRA	Inès Benyahia	9	3	4+2	2	0	0	0+3	1
11	FW	(Malawi) MAW	Tabitha Chaŵinga	10	1	3+3	1	0	0	2+2	0
12	DF	(Canada) CAN	Ashley Lawrence	6	0	5	0	0	0	1	0
13	MF	(Netherlands) NED	Damaris Egurrola	8	1	4	1	0	0	4	0
14	FW	(Norway) NOR	Ada Hegerberg	13	10	5+4	10	0	0	1+3	0
15	DF	(Norway) NOR	Ingrid Syrstad Engen	11	0	6+2	0	0	0	2+1	0
16	GK	(France) FRA	Feerine Belhadj	1	0	1	0	0	0	0	0
17	MF	(France) FRA	Maïssa Fathallah	2	0	1+1	0	0	0	0	0
20	MF	(United States) USA	Lily Yohannes	10	3	4+2	1	0	0	4	2
23	MF	(Scotland) SCO	Caroline Weir	3	1	0+1	1	0	0	1+1	0
24	MF	(France) FRA	Julie Swierot	8	1	5+3	1	0	0	0	0
25	GK	(Germany) GER	Mala Grohs	7	0	3	0	0	0	4	0
26	DF	(France) FRA	Wassa Sangaré	8	0	4+2	0	0	0	2	0
29	FW	(Germany) GER	Jule Brand	12	1	7+1	1	0	0	3+1	0
31	FW	(France) FRA	Liana Joseph	6	1	2+3	1	0	0	0+1	0
33	DF	(Brazil) BRA	Tarciane	9	1	5	1	0	0	2+2	0
77	FW	(Spain) ESP	Salma Paralluelo	11	3	6+1	3	0	0	3+1	0
Players away from the club on loan:
Players who appeared for OL Lyonnes but left during the season:

=== Goal scorers ===
Place	Position	Nation	Number	Name	Première Ligue	Coupe de France	UEFA Champions League	Total
1	MF	(Haiti)	6	Melchie Dumornay	11	0	3	14
1	FW	(France)	9	Marie-Antoinette Katoto	7	0	7	14
3	FW	(Norway)	14	Ada Hegerberg	10	0	0	10
4				Own goal	4	0	2	6
5	FW	(France)	7	Vicki Bècho	2	0	3	5
6	FW	(Spain)	77	Salma Paralluelo	3	0	0	3
6	MF	(France)	10	Inès Benyahia	2	0	1	3
6	MF	(United States)	20	Lily Yohannes	1	0	2	3
9	MF	(United States)	8	Korbin Shrader	1	0	1	2
9	DF	(France)	3	Wendie Renard	1	0	1	2
11	DF	(Brazil)	33	Tarciane	1	0	0	1
11	MF	(France)	24	Julie Swierot	1	0	0	1
11	FW	(Germany)	29	Jule Brand	1	0	0	1
11	FW	(Malawi)	11	Tabitha Chaŵinga	1	0	0	1
11	FW	(France)	31	Liana Joseph	1	0	0	1
11	MF	(Scotland)	23	Caroline Weir	1	0	0	1
11	MF	(Netherlands)	13	Damaris Egurrola	1	0	0	1
Total					49	0	20	69

=== Clean sheets ===
Place	Position	Nation	Number	Name	Première Ligue	Coupe de France	UEFA Champions League	Total
1	GK	(Germany)	25	Mala Grohs	1	0	4	5
2	GK	(Chile)	1	Christiane Endler	3	0	0	3
Total					4	0	4	8

=== Disciplinary record ===
Number	Nation	Position	Name	Première Ligue		Coupe de France		UEFA Champions League		Total	
Number	Nation	Position	Name	Yellow card	Red card	Yellow card	Red card	Yellow card	Red card	Yellow card	Red card
4	(France)	DF	Selma Bacha	1	0	0	0	0	0	1	0
5	(Sweden)	DF	Elma Junttila Nelhage	0	1	0	0	0	0	0	1
6	(Haiti)	MF	Melchie Dumornay	3	0	0	0	0	0	3	0
7	(France)	FW	Vicki Bècho	2	0	0	0	0	0	2	0
13	(Netherlands)	MF	Damaris Egurrola	1	0	0	0	0	0	1	0
14	(Norway)	FW	Ada Hegerberg	1	0	0	0	0	0	1	0
20	(United States)	MF	Lily Yohannes	1	0	0	0	1	0	2	0
26	(France)	DF	Wassa Sangaré	1	0	0	0	0	0	1	0
29	(Germany)	FW	Jule Brand	0	0	0	0	1	0	1	0
31	(France)	FW	Liana Joseph	1	0	0	0	0	0	1	0
33	(Brazil)	DF	Tarciane	1	0	0	0	1	0	2	0
77	(Spain)	FW	Salma Paralluelo	1	0	0	0	0	0	1	0
Players away on loan:
Players who left OL Lyonnes during the season:
Total				13	1	0	0	3	0	16	1
