= 2025–26 OL Lyonnes season =

OL Lyonnes
2025–26 season
- President: Michele Kang
- Head coach: Jonatan Giráldez
- Stadium: Groupama OL Training Center
- Première Ligue: Winners
- Coupe de France: Winners
- Coupe LFFP: Winners
- UEFA Champions League: Runners-up
- Top goalscorer: League: Tabitha Chawinga (12); All: Tabitha Chawinga (17)
Home colours	Away colours	Third colours

The 2025–26 OL Lyonnes season was the club's twenty-second season since Olympique Lyonnais joined OL Lyonnes as its women's section and first season with new logo and new name OL Lyonnes.

== Season events ==
On 22 May 2025, OL Lyonnes announced the singing of Jule Brand from VfL Wolfsburg on a contract until 2028.

On 1 June 2025, OL Lyonnes announced that Joe Montemurro had left his role as head coach. The following day, 2 June 2025, OL Lyonnes announced the appointment of Jonatan Giráldez as their new head coach, on a contract until June 2028.

On 4 June, OL Lyonnes announced the singing of Marie-Antoinette Katoto from Paris Saint-Germain on a contract until 30 June 2029.

On 17 June, Maïssa Fathallah signed her first contract with OL Lyonnes, until 30 June 2028.

On 20 June, OL Lyonnes announced the singing of Ingrid Syrstad Engen from Barça Femení on a contract until 30 June 2027.

On 2 July, OL Lyonnes announced the singing of Ashley Lawrence from Chelsea on a contract until 30 June 2028, whilst Ellie Carpenter departed the club to sign for Chelsea.

On 4 July, OL Lyonnes announced the signing of Korbin Albert from Paris Saint-Germain, on a contract until 30 June 2028.

On 8 July, OL Lyonnes announced the signing of Lily Yohannes from AFC Ajax, on a contract until 30 June 2028.

On 15 July, OL Lyonnes announced that Sofia Bekhaled had signed her first professional contract with the club, signing until June 2029.

On 16 July, OL Lyonnes announced the signing of Elida Kolbjørnsen from Stabæk, on a contract until 30 June 2028.

On 18 July, OL Lyonnes announced the signing of Teagan Micah to a one-year contract, after her contract with Liverpool had expired.

On 13 August, OL Lyonnes announced that Amel Majri had left the club in order to sign for Al-Ula.

On 23 August, OL Lyonnes announced that Leila Wandeler had left the club in order to sign for West Ham United.

On 29 August, Wassa Sangaré was sent on loan to London City Lionesses for the season.

On 10 September, OL Lyonnes announced that they had extended their contract with Selma Bacha by a year, keeping her at the club until 30 June 2030.

On 18 September, OL Lyonnes announced that they had extended their contract with Melchie Dumornay by a year, keeping her at the club until 30 June 2030.

On 23 September, Julie Swierot joined Nantes on loan for the season.

On 25 September, OL Lyonnes announced that they had extended their contract with Maeline Mendy until 30 June 2028, with Mendy joining Paris FC on loan for the season.

On 2 January, Kysha Sylla joined Paris FC on loan until 30 June 2026, after her loan deal with Washington Spirit concluded in December 2025.

On 9 January, OL Lyonnes announced that they had extended their contract with Inès Benyahia until 30 June 2028.

On 12 January, OL Lyonnes announced that Lindsey Heaps would leave the club at the end of the season to join the newly formed Denver Summit of the National Women's Soccer League.

On 15 January, OL Lyonnes announced that they had extended their contract with Alice Sombath until 30 June 2027.

On 20 January, OL Lyonnes announced that they had extended their contract with Liana Joseph until 30 June 2029.

On 6 February, Sofia Bekhaled joined Servette on loan until 30 June 2026.

On 9 March, OL Lyonnes announced the signing of Giovanna Waksman on a contract until the summer of 2028.

== Squad ==
As of match played 29 May 2026

No.	Name	Nationality	Position	Date of birth (age)	Signed from	Signed in	Contract ends	Apps.	Goals
Goalkeepers
1	Christiane Endler	(Chile)	GK	23 July 1991 (aged 34)	Paris Saint-Germain	2021	2027	152	0
16	Feerine Belhadj	(France)	GK	14 February 2005 (aged 21)	Academy	2023	2027	10	0
21	Teagan Micah	(Australia)	GK	20 October 1997 (aged 28)	Unattached	2025	2026	6	0
45	Alexane Lambert	(Switzerland)	GK	2 October 2008 (aged 17)	Academy	2025		0	0
56	Lou Marchal	(France)	GK	3 January 2007 (aged 19)	Academy	2025		1	0
Defenders
3	Wendie Renard (captain)	(France)	DF	20 July 1990 (aged 35)	Academy	2006	2027	532	170
4	Selma Bacha	(France)	DF	9 November 2000 (aged 25)	Academy	2017	2030	215	10
5	Elma Junttila Nelhage	(Sweden)	DF	21 May 2003 (aged 23)	BK Häcken	2025	2027	18	1
12	Ashley Lawrence	(Canada)	DF	11 June 1995 (aged 30)	Chelsea	2025	2028	31	1
18	Alice Sombath	(France)	DF	16 October 2003 (aged 22)	Paris Saint-Germain	2020	2027	106	2
23	Sofie Svava	(Denmark)	DF	11 August 2000 (aged 25)	Real Madrid	2024	2027	49	3
33	Tarciane	(Brazil)	DF	27 May 2003 (aged 23)	Houston Dash	2025	2029	35	4
36	Romane Rafalski	(France)	DF	3 March 2007 (aged 19)	Academy	2024		6	1
38	Sarah Rougeron	(France)	DF	19 June 2006 (aged 19)	Academy	2024		2	0
Midfielders
6	Melchie Dumornay	(Haiti)	MF	17 August 2003 (aged 22)	Stade de Reims	2023	2030	81	48
8	Korbin Shrader	(United States)	MF	13 October 2003 (aged 22)	Paris Saint-Germain	2025	2028	34	10
10	Lindsey Heaps	(United States)	MF	26 May 1994 (aged 32)	Portland Thorns	2023	2026	127	36
13	Damaris Egurrola	(Netherlands)	MF	26 August 1999 (aged 26)	Everton	2021	2027	157	10
15	Ingrid Syrstad Engen	(Norway)	MF	29 April 1998 (aged 28)	Barça Femení	2025	2027	29	1
17	Maïssa Fathallah	(France)	MF	9 April 2009 (aged 17)	Academy	2025	2028	5	0
20	Lily Yohannes	(United States)	MF	12 June 2007 (aged 18)	AFC Ajax	2025	2028	36	6
25	Inès Benyahia	(France)	MF	26 March 2003 (aged 23)	Academy	2020	2028	51	7
39	Charline Coutel	(France)	MF	12 June 2006 (aged 19)	Academy	2024		3	0
40	Lorna Douvier	(France)	MF	11 February 2006 (aged 20)	Academy	2024		3	0
	Giovanna Waksman	(Brazil)	MF	21 March 2009 (aged 17)	Unattached	2026	2028	0	0
Forwards
7	Vicki Bècho	(France)	FW	3 October 2003 (aged 22)	Paris Saint-Germain	2020	2027	121	27
9	Marie-Antoinette Katoto	(France)	FW	1 November 1998 (aged 27)	Paris Saint-Germain	2025	2029	40	17
11	Kadidiatou Diani	(France)	FW	1 April 1995 (aged 31)	Paris Saint-Germain	2023	2027	95	43
14	Ada Hegerberg	(Norway)	FW	10 July 1995 (aged 30)	Turbine Potsdam	2014	2027	303	284
22	Tabitha Chawinga	(Malawi)	FW	22 May 1996 (aged 30)	Wuhan Jianghan University	2024	2027	58	26
29	Jule Brand	(Germany)	FW	16 October 2002 (aged 23)	VfL Wolfsburg	2025	2028	38	8
31	Liana Joseph	(France)	FW	15 August 2006 (aged 19)	Academy	2023	2029	8	4
43	Camille Marmillot	(France)	FW	23 July 2008 (aged 17)	Academy	2025		2	1
Academy
35	Jade Derigent	(France)	DF	14 September 2009 (aged 16)	Academy	2026		1	0
37	Oceane Tranchant	(France)	MF	27 June 2008 (aged 17)	Academy	2026		1	0
41	Kelya Figueira	(France)	FW	28 April 2008 (aged 18)	Academy	2026		1	0
	Ambre Ouazar	(France)	MF	9 April 2007 (aged 19)	Academy	2023		2	0
	Aalyah Samadi	(Comoros)	MF	1 May 2007 (aged 19)	Academy	2024		1	0
	Elida Kolbjørnsen	(Norway)	MF	8 August 2008 (aged 17)	Stabæk	2025	2028	0	0
Out on loan
19	Kysha Sylla	(France)	DF	4 February 2004 (aged 22)	Academy	2021	2027	9	0
19	Julie Swierot	(France)	MF	14 March 2006 (aged 20)	Academy	2023	2027	3	0
28	Wassa Sangaré	(France)	DF	16 March 2006 (aged 20)	Academy	2023	2027	5	0
30	Sofia Bekhaled	(France)	FW	26 October 2006 (aged 19)	Academy	2023	2029	3	0
32	Maeline Mendy	(France)	MF	26 December 2006 (aged 19)	Academy	2023	2028	7	2
Left during the season
7	Amel Majri	(France)	MF	25 January 1993 (aged 33)	Academy	2010	2026	327	97
	Leila Wandeler	(Switzerland)	FW	11 April 2006 (aged 20)	Academy	2023		3	1

== Transfers ==
=== In ===
Date	Position	Nationality	Name	From	Fee	Ref.
22 May 2025 (Note: Transfer announced on the shown date, becoming official on 1 July 2025.)	MF	(Germany)	Jule Brand	VfL Wolfsburg	Undisclosed	
4 June 2025	FW	(France)	Marie-Antoinette Katoto	Paris Saint-Germain	Free	
20 June 2025	MF	(Norway)	Ingrid Syrstad Engen	Barça Femení	Free	
2 July 2025	DF	(Canada)	Ashley Lawrence	Chelsea	Undisclosed	
4 July 2025	MF	(United States)	Korbin Albert	Paris Saint-Germain	Undisclosed	
8 July 2025	MF	(United States)	Lily Yohannes	AFC Ajax	Undisclosed	
16 July 2025	MF	(Norway)	Elida Kolbjørnsen	Stabæk	Undisclosed	
18 July 2025	GK	(Australia)	Teagan Micah	Unattached	Free	
9 March 2026	MF	(Brazil)	Giovanna Waksman	Unattached	Free	

=== Out ===
Date	Position	Nationality	Name	To	Fee	Ref.
2 July 2025	DF	(Australia)	Ellie Carpenter	Chelsea	Undisclosed	
5 July 2025	DF	(Portugal)	Alice Marques	Sevilla	Undisclosed	
13 August 2025	MF	(France)	Amel Majri	Al-Ula	Undisclosed	
23 August 2025	FW	(Switzerland)	Leila Wandeler	West Ham United	Undisclosed	

=== Loans out ===
Start date	Position	Nationality	Name	To	End date	Ref.
6 February 2025	DF	(France)	Kysha Sylla	Washington Spirit	31 December 2025	
29 August 2025	DF	(France)	Wassa Sangaré	London City Lionesses	End of season	
23 September 2025	MF	(France)	Julie Swierot	Nantes	End of season	
25 September 2025	MF	(France)	Maeline Mendy	Paris FC	End of season	
2 January 2026	DF	(France)	Kysha Sylla	Paris FC	30 June 2026	
6 February 2026	FW	(France)	Sofia Bekhaled	Servette	30 June 2026	

=== Released ===
Date	Position	Nationality	Name	Joined	Date	Ref.
30 June 2026	MF	(United States)	Lindsey Heaps	Denver Summit	1 July 2026	

== Friendlies ==
9 August 2025	OL Lyonnes	5–0	Servette	Décines-Charpieu
15:00 CEST (UTC+2)	Joseph; Dumornay; Benyahia; Chawinga	Report		Stadium: Stade Gérard Houllier
Note: Match played behind closed doors.

16 August 2025	OL Lyonnes	3–0	1. FC Nürnberg	Décines-Charpieu
CEST (UTC+2)	Nelhage; Albert; Swierot	Report		Stadium: Stade Gérard Houllier
Note: Match played behind closed doors.

21 August 2025	OL Lyonnes	3–1	London City Lionesses	Décines-Charpieu
19:00 CEST (UTC+2)	Joseph 32'; Benyahia 67' (pen.); Yohannes 89'	Report	Godfrey 76'	Stadium: Stade Gérard Houllier

26 August 2025	Bayern Munich	1–4	OL Lyonnes	Herzogenaurach, Germany
CEST (UTC+2)	Oberdorf	Report	Renard 43'; Diani 81' (pen.); Joseph; Katoto	Stadium: Adi Dassler stadium

30 August 2025	OL Lyonnes	4–2	Eintracht Frankfurt	Herzogenaurach, Germany
CEST (UTC+2)	Joseph 3'; Katoto 16'; Diani 26'; Nelhage 60'	Report	Freigang; Bacha (o.g.)	Stadium: Adi Dassler stadium

== Competitions ==
=== Overview ===
Competition	First match	Last match	Starting round	Final position	Record							
Competition	First match	Last match	Starting round	Final position	Pld	W	D	L	GF	GA	GD	Win %
Première Ligue	7 September 2025	29 May 2026.	Matchday 1	Winners	24	21	3	0	89	11	+78	87.50
Coupe de France	10 January 2026	10 May 2026	Round of 32	Winners	5	5	0	0	28	2	+26	100.00
Coupe LFFP	4 February 2026	14 March 2026	Quarter-finals	Winners	3	3	0	0	9	0	+9	100.00
UEFA Champions League	4 October 2025	23 May 2026	League phase	Runnersup	11	7	1	3	26	13	+13	63.64
Total					43	36	4	3	152	26	+126	83.72

Last updated: 29 May 2026
Source: Competitions

=== Première Ligue ===
==== Regular season ====
===== Table =====
Pos	Team	Pld	W	D	L	GF	GA	GD	Pts	Qualification or relegation
1	Lyon (C)	22	19	3	0	76	11	+65	60	Qualification for the playoffs
2	Paris FC	22	15	3	4	46	16	+30	48	Qualification for the playoffs
3	Paris Saint-Germain	22	15	2	5	48	26	+22	47	Qualification for the playoffs
4	Nantes	22	12	5	5	42	34	+8	41	Qualification for the playoffs
5	Fleury	22	9	6	7	27	21	+6	33	

Source: FFF.fr
Rules for classification: 1) points; 2) head-to-head points; 3) head-to-head goal difference; 4) goal difference; 5) goals scored
(C) Champions

===== Results summary =====
Overall								Home						Away					
Pld	W	D	L	GF	GA	GD	Pts	W	D	L	GF	GA	GD	W	D	L	GF	GA	GD
22	19	3	0	76	11	+65	60	11	0	0	39	4	+35	8	3	0	37	7	+30

Last updated: 6 May 2026.

===== Results by matchday =====
Matchday	1	2	3	4	5	6	7	8	9	10	11	12	13	14	15	16	17	18	19	20	21	22
Ground	H	A	H	H	H	H	A	H	A	A	H	H	A	A	H	A	H	A	A	H	A	H
Result	W	W	W	W	W	W	W	W	W	W	W	W	D	W	W	W	W	W	D	W	D	W
Position	1	1	1	1	1	1	1	1	1	1	1	1	1	1	1	1	1	1	1	1	1	1

Updated to match(es) played on 6 May 2026. Source: Results
A = Away; H = Home; W = Win; D = Draw; L = Loss; P = Postponed

===== Results =====
7 September 2025 1	OL Lyonnes	3–1	Les Marseillaises	Décines-Charpieu
17:30 CEST (UTC+2)	Hegerberg 32' (yellow card) 71'; Joseph 58'; Yohannes 63'; Benyahia (yellow card) 78'	Report	Bourdieu (yellow card) 36' (goal) 90+1'	Stadium: Parc Olympique Lyonnais; Referee: Audrey Gerbel

20 September 2025 2	Saint-Étienne	0–2	OL Lyonnes	Saint-Étienne
14:30 CEST (UTC+2)	Bataillard (yellow card) 26'; Fon (yellow card) 87'	Report	Heaps 42'; Egurrola (yellow card) 64'; Katoto 76'	Stadium: Stade Etivallière; Referee: Alexandra Collin

27 September 2025 3	OL Lyonnes	6–1	Paris Saint-Germain	Décines-Charpieu
21:00 CEST (UTC+2)	Tarciane 5'; Diani (yellow card) 45'; Heaps 59'; Shrader 70', 74', 85'; Chawinga 90'	Report	Ajibade (yellow card) 20'; Bathy (yellow card) 25'; Leuchter 33'; Gilbert (yellow card) 35'	Stadium: Parc Olympique Lyonnais; Referee: Emeline Rochebiliere

3 October 2025 4	RC Lens	1–8	OL Lyonnes	Avion
19:00 CEST (UTC+2)	Jeudy 24'; Polito (yellow card) 31'; Revelli (yellow card) 65' (yellow-red card) 71'	Report	Bècho 1', 58', 65'; Chawinga 10'; Lawrence (yellow card) 57'; Joseph 74', 79', 82'; Dumornay 88'	Stadium: Stade François Blin; Referee: Morgane Chignard

18 October 2025 5	OL Lyonnes	6–1	Nantes	Décines-Charpieu
20:00 CEST (UTC+2)	Shrader 7'; Katoto 10'; Renard 27'; Chawinga 35'; Diani 58'; Tarciane 89'	Report	Swierot (yellow card) 25'; Calbe 10'; Sumo (yellow card) 79'; Bethi (yellow card) 90'	Stadium: Parc Olympique Lyonnais; Referee: Cecile Bessiere

1 November 2025 6	OL Lyonnes	1–0	Paris FC	Décines-Charpieu
20:00 CET (UTC+1)	Nelhage (yellow card) 65'; Chawinga 75'	Report	Davis (yellow card) 7'; Jedlińska (yellow card) 90'	Stadium: Parc Olympique Lyonnais; Referee: Alexandra Collin

7 November 2025 7	Montpellier	1–5	OL Lyonnes	Montpellier
18:00 CET (UTC+1)	Gstalter (yellow card) 34'; Rouquet 54'	Report	Heaps 8'; Yohannes (yellow card) 26'; Benyahia 28'; Nelhage 45'; Dumornay 85'; Hegerberg 90'	Stadium: Stade Bernard Gasset; Referee: Emeline Rochebiliere

22 November 2025 8	OL Lyonnes	5–0	RC Strasbourg	Décines-Charpieu
20:00 CET (UTC+1)	Bècho 45'; Chaney 57' (o.g.); Renard (yellow card) 67'; Brand 69'; Tarciane 84'; Hegerberg 88'	Report	Hoeltzel (yellow card) 89'	Stadium: Parc Olympique Lyonnais; Referee: Romy Fournier

6 December 2025 9	Dijon FCO	0–3	OL Lyonnes	Dijon
16:00 CET (UTC+1)	Ndzana (yellow card) 57'	Report	Tarciane (yellow card) 17'; Engen 25'; Egurrola 36'; Brand 55'	Stadium: Stade Gaston Gérard; Referee: Morgane Chignard

13 December 2025 10	Le Havre	0–7	OL Lyonnes	Le Havre
16:00 CET (UTC+1)	Boisard (yellow card) 36'; Kouache (yellow card) 74'	Report	Diani 16', 61'; Katoto 43'; Bècho 52'; Benyahia 56'; Chawinga 82', 90'	Stadium: Stade Océane; Referee: Charlène Laur

20 December 2025 11	OL Lyonnes	3–0	Fleury 91	Décines-Charpieu
20:00 CET (UTC+1)	Shrader (yellow card) 17'; Dumornay (yellow card) 18'; Katoto 33'; Yohannes 62'; Bècho 70' (yellow card) 90'	Report	Jaurena (yellow card) 18'	Stadium: Parc Olympique Lyonnais; Referee: Alexandra Collin

14 January 2026 12	OL Lyonnes	1–0	RC Lens	Décines-Charpieu
18:00 CET (UTC+1)	Sombath (yellow card) 16'; Yohannes 27'; Nelhage (yellow card) 52'	Report	Polito (yellow card) 43'	Stadium: Parc Olympique Lyonnais; Referee: Charlene Laur

18 January 2026 13	Paris FC	0–0	OL Lyonnes	Paris
13:00 CET (UTC+1)	Korošec (yellow card) 34'; Picard (yellow card) 71'	Report	Hegerberg (yellow card) 27'; Bacha (yellow card) 85'	Stadium: Stade Sébastien Charléty; Referee: Emeline Rochebiliere

1 February 2026 14	Paris Saint-Germain	0–1	OL Lyonnes	Poissy
15:00 CET (UTC+1)	Kanjinga (yellow card) 36'; Bathy (yellow card) 45'; Ebayilin (yellow card) 50'; Groenen (yellow card) 60'	Report	Chawinga 23'; Tarciane (yellow card) 49'	Stadium: Campus PSG; Referee: Clémence Goncalves

8 February 2026 15	OL Lyonnes	4–0	Saint-Étienne	Décines-Charpieu
15:00 CET (UTC+1)	Benyahia 45'; Svava 47'; Katoto 71'; Diani 90'	Report	Hermann (yellow card) 45'; Belkhiter (yellow card) 90'	Stadium: Parc Olympique Lyonnais; Referee: Cecile Bessiere

21 February 2026 16	Les Marseillaises	2–6	OL Lyonnes	Marseille
21:00 CET (UTC+1)	Cabezas (yellow card) 20'; Bourgouin (yellow card) 31'; Le Mouël 59' (pen.); Herrera 65'	Report	Shrader 33'; Diani (yellow card) 40'; Chawinga 45+1', 51'; Dumornay 55'; Bècho 57'; Egurrola (yellow card) 68'; Brand 82'	Stadium: La Commanderie; Referee: Elisa Daupeux

10 March 2026 17	OL Lyonnes	3–0	Le Havre	Décines-Charpieu
19:00 CET (UTC+1)	Chawinga 26'; Barón 45' (o.g.); Renard 86'	Report	Adjabi (yellow card) 88'	Stadium: Parc Olympique Lyonnais; Referee: Morgane Chignard

21 March 2026 18	Fleury 91	0–2	OL Lyonnes	Bondoufle
21:00 CET (UTC+1)	Jaurena (yellow card) 59'; Chossenotte (yellow card) 87'	Report	Hegerberg 35'; Diani 44'; Yohannes (yellow card) 51'; Svava (yellow card) 70'	Stadium: Stade Robert Bobin; Referee: Alexandra Collin

28 March 2026 19	RC Strasbourg	2–2	OL Lyonnes	Strasbourg
18:00 CET (UTC+1)	Lourenço 21'; Tchakounté (yellow card) 53'; Barrett 76'	Report	Shrader 25'; Yohannes 81'	Stadium: Stade de la Meinau; Referee: Charlène Laur

22 April 2026 20	OL Lyonnes	4–0	Dijon	Décines-Charpieu
18:45 CEST (UTC+2)	Brand 9'; Katoto 28'; Shrader (yellow card) 30'; Coutel (yellow card) 45'; Tarciane 49'; Bècho 57'	Report	Fontaine (yellow card) 6'; Carage (yellow card) 65'	Stadium: Parc Olympique Lyonnais; Referee: Agathe Kocher

29 April 2026 21	Nantes	1–1	OL Lyonnes	Nantes
19:00 CEST (UTC+2)	Swierot 86'	Report	Marmillot 31' (yellow card) 55'; Coutel (yellow card) 65'; Tranchant (yellow card) 77'	Stadium: Stade Marcel-Saupin; Referee: Alexandra Collin

6 May 2026 22	OL Lyonnes	3–1	Montpellier	Décines-Charpieu
18:45 CEST (UTC+2)	Shrader 9'; Rafalski 13'; Lawrence 90+2'	Report	Chabod (yellow card) 16'; Louis (yellow card) 48'; Coquet 75'; Palis (yellow card) 90+2'	Stadium: Parc Olympique Lyonnais; Referee: Audrey Gerbel

==== Playoffs ====
16 May 2026 Semifinal	OL Lyonnes	8–0	Nantes	Décines-Charpieu
18:00 CEST (UTC+2)	Renard (yellow card) 36' (goal) 53'; Bacha (yellow card) 41'; Dumornay 46', 60'; Bècho 50'; Heaps 67'; Hegerberg 80' (pen.), 85', 89'	Report		Stadium: Parc Olympique Lyonnais; Referee: Romy Fournier

29 May 2026 Final	OL Lyonnes	5–0	Paris FC	Décines-Charpieu
21:00 CEST (UTC+2)	Chawinga 11', 17'; Dumornay 22', 60', 89'; Egurrola (yellow card) 71'; Svava (yellow card) 79'	Report	Yerro (yellow card) 90'	Stadium: Parc Olympique Lyonnais; Referee: Elisa Daupeux

=== Coupe de France ===
10 January 2026 Round of 32	Saint-Étienne	0–6	OL Lyonnes	Saint-Étienne
13:30 CET (UTC+1)		Report	Chawinga 12', 80'; Hegerberg 21'; Tarciane (yellow card) 61'; Renard 72'; Diani 85', 90'	Stadium: Stade Etivallière; Referee: Romy Fournier

24 January 2026 Round of 16	Les Marseillaises	1–5	OL Lyonnes	Marseille
16:00 CET (UTC+1)	Léger (yellow card) 24' (goal) 82'; Le Mouël (yellow card) 72'; Compaoré (yellow card) 85'	Report	Katoto 13', 55', 59'; Renard 43'; Bècho 45'; Dumornay (yellow card) 45'; Bacha (yellow card) 71'; Nelhage (yellow card) 81'	Stadium: La Commanderie; Referee: Romy Fournier

18 March 2026 Quarter-final	OL Lyonnes	7–0	Le Havre	Décines-Charpieu
15:00 CET (UTC+1)	Svava 5'; Brand (yellow card) 47' (goal) 72'; Katoto 49', 78'; Egurrola 61'; Heaps 75'; Shrader 82'	Report	Kassi (yellow card) 49'	Stadium: Stade Gérard Houllier; Referee: Charlène Laur

5 April 2026 Semi-final	RC Strasbourg	0–6	OL Lyonnes	Molsheim
14:30 CEST (UTC+2)		Report	Svava 3'; Katoto 5', 44' (pen.); Renard 30' (pen.); Hegerberg 34'; Shrader 73'	Stadium: Parc des Sports Stadium N°1; Referee: Audrey Gerbel

10 May 2026 Final	Paris Saint-Germain	1–4	OL Lyonnes	Valenciennes
15:30 CEST (UTC+2)	Ajibade (yellow card) 53'; Kanjinga 63'	Report	Dumornay 23' (yellow card) 70'; Bècho 35', 40'; Yohannes (yellow card) 49'; Heaps 75'	Stadium: Stade du Hainaut; Referee: Elisa Daupeux

=== Coupe LFFP ===
4 February 2026 Quarter-final	OL Lyonnes	4–0	Les Marseillaises	Décines-Charpieu
15:00 CET (UTC+1)	Bècho 4'; Benyahia 27'; Hegerberg 30'; Sombath (yellow card) 66'; Katoto 80'	Report	Álvarez (yellow card) 90'	Stadium: Parc Olympique Lyonnais; Attendance: 996; Referee: Audrey Gerbel

14 February 2026 Semi-final	Dijon	0–4	OL Lyonnes	Dijon
19:00 CET (UTC+1)		Report	Lawrence (yellow card) 5'; Hegerberg 17', 32'; Bacha 65'; Katoto 88'	Stadium: Stade Gaston Gérard; Attendance: 690; Referee: Maika Vanderstichel

14 March 2026 Final	OL Lyonnes	1–0	Paris Saint-Germain	Abidjan, Ivory Coast
18:30 CET (UTC+1)	Heaps (yellow card) 21'; Egurrola (yellow card) 50'; Dumornay 59'	Report	Kanjinga (yellow card) 16'; Leuchter (yellow card) 30'; Ebayilin (yellow card) 34'; Ajibade (yellow card) 90+6'	Stadium: Felix Houphouet Boigny Stadium; Attendance: 27,900; Referee: Émeline Rochebilière

=== UEFA Champions League ===
==== League phase ====
Pos	Team	Pld	W	D	L	GF	GA	GD	Pts	Qualification
1	(Royal Spanish Football Federation) Barcelona	6	5	1	0	20	3	+17	16	Advance to the quarter-finals (seeded)
2	(French Football Federation) OL Lyonnes	6	5	1	0	18	5	+13	16	Advance to the quarter-finals (seeded)
3	(The Football Association) Chelsea	6	4	2	0	20	3	+17	14	Advance to the quarter-finals (seeded)
4	(German Football Association) Bayern Munich	6	4	1	1	14	13	+1	13	Advance to the quarter-finals (seeded)
5	(The Football Association) Arsenal	6	4	0	2	11	6	+5	12	Advance to the knockout phase play-offs (seeded)
6	(The Football Association) Manchester United	6	4	0	2	7	9	−2	12	Advance to the knockout phase play-offs (seeded)
7	(Royal Spanish Football Federation) Real Madrid	6	3	2	1	13	7	+6	11	Advance to the knockout phase play-offs (seeded)
8	(Italian Football Federation) Juventus	6	3	1	2	13	8	+5	10	Advance to the knockout phase play-offs (seeded)
9	(German Football Association) VfL Wolfsburg	6	3	0	3	13	10	+3	9	Advance to the knockout phase play-offs (unseeded)
10	(French Football Federation) Paris FC	6	2	2	2	6	9	−3	8	Advance to the knockout phase play-offs (unseeded)
11	(Royal Spanish Football Federation) Atlético Madrid	6	2	1	3	13	9	+4	7	Advance to the knockout phase play-offs (unseeded)
12	(Royal Belgian Football Association) OH Leuven	6	1	3	2	5	10	−5	6	Advance to the knockout phase play-offs (unseeded)
13	(Norwegian Football Federation) Vålerenga	6	1	1	4	4	9	−5	4	
14	(Italian Football Federation) Roma	6	1	1	4	9	19	−10	4	
15	(Royal Dutch Football Association) Twente	6	0	3	3	4	10	−6	3	
16	(Portuguese Football Federation) Benfica	6	0	2	4	4	11	−7	2	
17	(French Football Federation) Paris Saint-Germain	6	0	2	4	4	12	−8	2	
18	(Austrian Football Association) St. Pölten	6	0	1	5	3	28	−25	1	

Source: UEFA
Rules for classification: League phase tiebreakers

7 October 2025 1	Arsenal (England)	1–2	(France) OL Lyonnes	Borehamwood, England
21:00 CEST (UTC+2)	Russo 7'; Mead (yellow card) 35'; Maanum (yellow card) 84'	Report	Katoto (yellow card) 5'; Dumornay 18', 23'; Tarciane (yellow card) 79'	Stadium: Meadow Park; Attendance: 3,023; Referee: Maria Sole Ferrieri Caputi (Italy)

15 October 2025 2	OL Lyonnes (France)	3–0	(Austria) St. Pölten	Décines-Charpieu, France
18:45 CEST (UTC+2)	Brand 28'; Hegerberg 45'; Yohannes 52'	Report		Stadium: Parc Olympique Lyonnais; Attendance: 3,135; Referee: Emanuela Rusta (Albania)

11 November 2025 3	OL Lyonnes (France)	3–1	(Germany) VfL Wolfsburg	Décines-Charpieu, France
21:00 CET (UTC+1)	Hegerberg 25', 30'; Renard 72' (pen.)	Report	Zicai (yellow card) 53'; Beerensteyn 80'	Stadium: Parc Olympique Lyonnais; Attendance: 4,009; Referee: Eleni Antoniou (Greece)

19 November 2025 4	Juventus (Italy)	3–3	(France) OL Lyonnes	Biella, Italy
18:45 CET (UTC+1)	Beccari 12'; Brighton (yellow card) 20'; Cambiaghi 27'; Pinto 37'; Peyraud-Magnin (yellow card) 84'	Report	Dumornay (yellow card) 39'; Chawinga 60'; Katoto 79'; Renard 90' (pen.)	Stadium: Stadio La Marmora-Pozzo; Attendance: 710; Referee: Olatz Rivera Olmedo (Spain)

10 December 2025 5	Manchester United (England)	0–3	(France) OL Lyonnes	Leigh, England
21:00 CET (UTC+1)	Naalsund (yellow card) 33'; Zigiotti Olme (yellow card) 48'	Report	Chawinga 12'; Dumornay 81', 90'	Stadium: Leigh Sports Village; Referee: Alina Peşu (Romania) [

17 December 2025 6	OL Lyonnes (France)	4–0	(Spain) Atlético Madrid	Décines-Charpieu, France
21:00 CET (UTC+1)	Tarciane (yellow card) 13'; Bøe Risa 30' (o.g.); Renard 52' (pen.); Diani 53'; Shrader 71'	Report	Luany (red card) 36'	Stadium: Parc Olympique Lyonnais; Attendance: 5,028; Referee: Ivana Projkovska (North Macedonia)

==== Knockout phase ====
24 March 2026 Quarter-final 1st leg	VfL Wolfsburg (Germany)	1–0	(France) OL Lyonnes	Wolfsburg, Germany
18:45 CET (UTC+1)	Beerensteyn 14'; Johannes (yellow card) 89'; Küver (yellow card) 90'	Report	Egurrola (yellow card) 67'	Stadium: Volkswagen Arena; Attendance: 5,089; Referee: Emanuela Rusta (Albania)

2 April 2026 Quarter-final 2nd leg	OL Lyonnes (France)	4–0 (a.e.t.) (4–1 agg.)	(Germany) VfL Wolfsburg	Décines-Charpieu, France
21:00 CEST (UTC+2)	Yohannes 16' (yellow card) 60'; Brand (yellow card) 61'; Dumornay 102'; Egurrola 105+2'; Chawinga 119'	Report		Stadium: Parc Olympique Lyonnais; Attendance: 14,083; Referee: Marta Huerta de Aza (Spain)

26 April 2026 Semi-final 1st leg	Arsenal (England)	2–1	(France) OL Lyonnes	London, England
16:30 CEST (UTC+2)	Engen 59' (o.g.); Smith 83'	Report	Brand 18'; Hegerberg (yellow card) 32'; Heaps (yellow card) 43'; Yohannes (yellow card) 53'	Stadium: Emirates Stadium; Attendance: 26,758; Referee: Désirée Blanco (Switzerland)

2 May 2026 Semi-final 2nd leg	OL Lyonnes (France)	3–1 (4–3 agg.)	(England) Arsenal	Décines-Charpieu, France
15:00 CEST (UTC+2)	Renard 22' (pen.) (yellow card) 47'; Diani 36'; Brand 86'	Report	Wubben-Moy (yellow card) 19'; McCabe (yellow card) 22'; Pelova (yellow card) 70'; Russo 76'; Foord (yellow card) 90+5'	Stadium: Parc Olympique Lyonnais; Attendance: 22,505; Referee: Maria Sole Ferrieri Caputi (Italy)

23 May 2026 Final	Barcelona (Spain)	4–0	(France) OL Lyonnes	Oslo, Norway
18:00 CEST (UTC+2)	Pajor 55', 69'; Putellas (yellow card) 68'; Coll (yellow card) 88'; Paralluelo 90', 90+3'	Report	Dumornay (yellow card) 73'	Stadium: Ullevaal Stadion; Attendance: 24,258; Referee: Tess Olofsson (Sweden)

== Squad statistics ==
As of match played 29 May 2026

=== Appearances ===
No.	Pos	Nat	Player	Total		Première Ligue		Coupe de France		Coupe LFFP		UEFA Champions League	
No.	Pos	Nat	Player	Apps	Goals	Apps	Goals	Apps	Goals	Apps	Goals	Apps	Goals
1	GK	(Chile) CHI	Christiane Endler	30	0	14	0	5	0	1	0	10	0
3	DF	(France) FRA	Wendie Renard	28	10	12+1	3	4	3	1	0	9+1	4
4	DF	(France) FRA	Selma Bacha	27	1	11+1	0	3+1	0	2	1	9	0
5	DF	(Sweden) SWE	Elma Junttila Nelhage	14	1	8+2	1	1+2	0	0	0	1	0
6	MF	(Haiti) HAI	Melchie Dumornay	33	15	12+5	8	3	1	2+1	1	8+2	5
7	FW	(France) FRA	Vicki Bècho	35	13	16+6	9	3+2	3	2	1	2+4	0
8	MF	(United States) USA	Korbin Shrader	35	10	15+4	7	3+1	2	0+1	0	4+7	1
9	FW	(France) FRA	Marie-Antoinette Katoto	40	16	14+8	6	4+1	7	0+3	2	1+9	1
10	MF	(United States) USA	Lindsey Heaps	35	6	8+8	4	3+2	2	3	0	10+1	0
11	FW	(France) FRA	Kadidiatou Diani	32	9	9+7	5	2+1	2	1+2	0	8+2	2
12	DF	(Canada) CAN	Ashley Lawrence	31	1	11+7	1	2	0	3	0	6+2	0
13	MF	(Netherlands) NED	Damaris Egurrola	34	3	11+7	1	2+3	1	2	0	4+5	1
14	FW	(Norway) NOR	Ada Hegerberg	35	15	8+9	7	2+2	2	3	3	10+1	3
15	MF	(Norway) NOR	Ingrid Syrstad Engen	29	1	13+1	1	2	0	2+1	0	10	0
16	GK	(France) FRA	Feerine Belhadj	8	0	6	0	0	0	2	0	0	0
17	MF	(France) FRA	Maïssa Fathallah	5	0	1+2	0	0+1	0	1	0	0	0
18	DF	(France) FRA	Alice Sombath	27	0	14+1	0	3+2	0	2+1	0	2+2	0
20	MF	(United States) USA	Lily Yohannes	36	6	13+7	4	2+1	0	1+2	0	6+4	2
21	GK	(Australia) AUS	Teagan Micah	6	0	4	0	0+1	0	0	0	1	0
22	FW	(Malawi) MAW	Tabitha Chawinga	29	17	10+8	12	1+1	2	1	0	5+3	3
23	DF	(Denmark) DEN	Sofie Svava	22	3	10+6	1	2+1	2	1	0	2	0
25	MF	(France) FRA	Inès Benyahia	22	4	10+4	3	1+1	0	1+1	1	1+3	0
29	FW	(Germany) GER	Jule Brand	38	8	10+10	4	4	1	2+1	0	7+4	3
30	FW	(France) FRA	Sofia Bekhaled	1	0	0	0	0	0	0	0	0+1	0
31	FW	(France) FRA	Liana Joseph	4	4	2+1	4	0	0	0	0	0+1	0
33	DF	(Brazil) BRA	Tarciane	28	4	12+6	4	3+1	0	0+1	0	5	0
35	DF	(France) FRA	Jade Derigent	1	0	0+1	0	0	0	0	0	0	0
36	DF	(France) FRA	Romane Rafalski	5	1	3+1	1	0	0	0+1	0	0	0
37	MF	(France) FRA	Oceane Tranchant	1	0	0+1	0	0	0	0	0	0	0
38	DF	(France) FRA	Sarah Rougeron	2	0	1+1	0	0	0	0	0	0	0
39	MF	(France) FRA	Charline Coutel	2	0	2	0	0	0	0	0	0	0
40	MF	(France) FRA	Lorna Douvier	2	0	2	0	0	0	0	0	0	0
41	FW	(France) FRA	Kelya Figueira	1	0	0+1	0	0	0	0	0	0	0
43	FW	(France) FRA	Camille Marmillot	2	1	1+1	1	0	0	0	0	0	0
56	GK	(France) FRA	Lou Marchal	1	0	0+1	0	0	0	0	0	0	0
Players away from the club on loan:
Players who appeared for OL Lyonnes but left during the season:

=== Goal scorers ===
Place	Position	Nation	Number	Name	Première Ligue	Coupe de France	Coupe LFFP	UEFA Champions League	Total
1	FW	(Malawi)	22	Tabitha Chawinga	12	2	0	3	17
2	FW	(France)	9	Marie-Antoinette Katoto	6	7	2	1	16
3	MF	(Haiti)	6	Melchie Dumornay	8	1	1	5	15
3	FW	(Norway)	14	Ada Hegerberg	7	2	3	3	15
5	FW	(France)	7	Vicki Bècho	9	3	1	0	13
6	MF	(United States)	8	Korbin Shrader	7	2	0	1	10
6	DF	(France)	3	Wendie Renard	4	3	0	3	10
8	FW	(France)	11	Kadidiatou Diani	5	2	0	2	9
9	FW	(Germany)	29	Jule Brand	5	1	0	2	8
10	MF	(United States)	10	Lindsey Heaps	4	2	0	0	6
10	MF	(United States)	20	Lily Yohannes	4	0	0	2	6
12	DF	(Brazil)	33	Tarciane	4	0	0	0	4
12	MF	(France)	25	Inès Benyahia	3	0	1	0	4
14	FW	(France)	31	Liana Joseph	3	0	0	0	3
14	MF	(Netherlands)	13	Damaris Egurrola	1	1	0	1	3
14	DF	(Denmark)	23	Sofie Svava	1	2	0	0	3
14				Own Goal	2	0	0	1	3
19	DF	(Sweden)	5	Elma Junttila Nelhage	1	0	0	0	1
19	MF	(Norway)	15	Ingrid Syrstad Engen	1	0	0	0	1
19	FW	(France)	43	Camille Marmillot	1	0	0	0	1
19	DF	(France)	36	Romane Rafalski	1	0	0	0	1
19	DF	(Canada)	12	Ashley Lawrence	1	0	0	0	1
19	DF	(France)	4	Selma Bacha	0	0	1	0	1
Total					89	28	9	26	152

=== Clean sheets ===
Place	Position	Nation	Number	Name	Première Ligue	Coupe de France	Coupe LFFP	UEFA Champions League	Total
1	GK	(Chile)	1	Christiane Endler	7	3	1	3	14
2	GK	(France)	16	Feerine Belhadj	4	0	2	0	6
3	GK	(Australia)	21	Teagan Micah	4	0	0	1	5
Total					15	3	3	4	25

=== Disciplinary record ===
Number	Nation	Position	Name	Première Ligue		Coupe de France		Coupe LFFP		UEFA Champions League		Total	
Number	Nation	Position	Name	Booked	Sent off (straight red)	Booked	Sent off (straight red)	Booked	Sent off (straight red)	Booked	Sent off (straight red)	Booked	Sent off (straight red)
3	(France)	DF	Wendie Renard	2	0	0	0	0	0	1	0	3	0
4	(France)	DF	Selma Bacha	2	0	1	0	0	0	0	0	3	0
5	(Sweden)	DF	Elma Junttila Nelhage	2	0	1	0	0	0	0	0	3	0
6	(Haiti)	MF	Melchie Dumornay	1	0	2	0	0	0	2	0	5	0
7	(France)	FW	Vicki Bècho	1	0	0	0	0	0	0	0	1	0
8	(United States)	MF	Korbin Shrader	2	0	0	0	0	0	0	0	2	0
9	(France)	FW	Marie-Antoinette Katoto	0	0	0	0	0	0	1	0	1	0
10	(United States)	MF	Lindsey Heaps	0	0	0	0	1	0	1	0	2	0
11	(France)	FW	Kadidiatou Diani	2	0	0	0	0	0	0	0	2	0
12	(Canada)	DF	Ashley Lawrence	1	0	0	0	1	0	0	0	2	0
13	(Netherlands)	MF	Damaris Egurrola	3	0	0	0	1	0	1	0	5	0
14	(Norway)	FW	Ada Hegerberg	2	0	0	0	0	0	1	0	3	0
18	(France)	DF	Alice Sombath	1	0	0	0	1	0	0	0	2	0
20	(United States)	MF	Lily Yohannes	2	0	1	0	0	0	2	0	5	0
23	(Denmark)	DF	Sofie Svava	2	0	0	0	0	0	0	0	2	0
25	(France)	MF	Inès Benyahia	1	0	0	0	0	0	0	0	1	0
29	(Germany)	FW	Jule Brand	0	0	1	0	0	0	1	0	2	0
33	(Brazil)	DF	Tarciane	2	0	1	0	0	0	2	0	5	0
37	(France)	MF	Oceane Tranchant	1	0	0	0	0	0	0	0	1	0
39	(France)	MF	Charline Coutel	2	0	0	0	0	0	0	0	2	0
43	(France)	FW	Camille Marmillot	1	0	0	0	0	0	0	0	1	0
Players away on loan:
Players who left OL Lyonnes during the season:
Total				29	0	7	0	4	0	12	0	52	0
