= 2024–25 Olympique Lyonnais Féminin season =

Olympique Lyonnais Féminin
2024–25 season
- Manager: Joe Montemurro
- Stadium: Groupama OL Training Center
- Première Ligue: Winners
- Coupe de France: Round of 32 vs Stade de Reims
- UEFA Champions League: Semi-finals vs Arsenal
- Top goalscorer: League: Melchie Dumornay (17); All: Melchie Dumornay (22)
Home colours	Away colours	Third colours

The 2024–25 Olympique Lyonnais Féminin season is the club's twenty-first season since FC Lyon joined OL as its women's section.

== Season events ==
In early June, the 2024 edition of the Trophée des Championnes was cancelled due to fixture congestion.

On 19 June, Lyon announced Joe Montemurro as their new head coach on a contract until 30 June 2026.

On 24 June, Lyon announced the signing of Sofie Svava from Real Madrid on a contract until 30 June 2027.

On 2 July, Lyon announced the signing of Tabitha Chawinga from Wuhan Jianghan University on a contract until 30 June 2027.

On 12 July, Lyon announced that Melvine Malard had signed permanently for Manchester United after spending the previous season on loan at the Women's Super League club.

On 15 July, Lyon announced that they had extended their contract with Alice Marques for an additional year, and that she had joined Valencia for the season.

On 16 July, Lyon announced that they had extended their contract with Kysha Sylla for an additional year, until the summer of 2026.

On 1 August, Lyon announced that they had extended their contract with Julie Swierot for an additional year, until the summer of 2027, and that she had joined Reims on loan for the season.

On 2 September, Lyon announced that they had extended their contract with Wendie Renard until the summer of 2027.

On 12 September, Lyon announced the season-long loan signing of Sofia Huerta from Seattle Reign.

On 16 December, Lyon announced that they had extended their contract with Selma Bacha until the summer of 2029.

On 3 January, Lyon announced the signing of Elma Junttila Nelhage from BK Häcken on a contract until 30 June 2027.

On 11 January, Lyon extended their contract with Maeline Mendy until the summer of 2027.

On 15 January, Lyon announced that Liana Joseph and Maeline Mendy had both joined Strasbourg Alsace on loan for the remainder of the season. The following day, 16 January, Wassa Sangare extended her contract with Lyon until 30 June 2027, and joined Le Havre on loan for the remainder of the season.

On 2 February, Lyon announced the signing of Tarciane from Houston Dash on a contract until 30 June 2029.

On 6 February, Lyon announced that they had extended their contract with Kysha Sylla until the summer of 2027, and that she had joined Washington Spirit on loan until 31 December 2025.

On 2 April, Lyon announced that they had extended their contract with Feerine Belhadj until the summer of 2027.

On 5 May, Lyon announced that they had extended their contract with Melchie Dumornay until the summer of 2029.

On 19 May, Majority Owner Michele Kang, announced that the club would know be known as OL Lyonnes.

== Squad ==
As of match played 16 May 2025

No.	Name	Nationality	Position	Date of birth (age)	Signed from	Signed in	Contract ends	Apps.	Goals
Goalkeepers
1	Christiane Endler	(Chile)	GK	23 July 1991 (aged 33)	Paris Saint-Germain	2021	2027	122	0
16	Feerine Belhadj	(France)	GK	14 February 2005 (aged 20)	Academy	2023	2027	2	0
30	Laura Benkarth	(Germany)	GK	14 October 1992 (aged 32)	Bayern Munich	2023	2025	12	0
40	Yasmine Ammar	(Switzerland)	GK	10 August 2006 (aged 18)	Academy	2024		0	0
Defenders
2	Sofia Huerta	(United States)	DF	14 December 1992 (aged 32)	on loan from Seattle Reign	2024	2025	18	1
3	Wendie Renard (captain)	(France)	DF	20 July 1990 (aged 34)	Academy	2006	2027	504	159
4	Selma Bacha	(France)	DF	9 November 2000 (aged 24)	Academy	2017	2029	187	9
5	Elma Junttila Nelhage	(Sweden)	DF	21 May 2003 (aged 21)	BK Häcken	2025	2027	4	0
12	Ellie Carpenter	(Australia)	DF	8 April 2000 (aged 25)	Portland Thorns	2020	2026	126	3
18	Alice Sombath	(France)	DF	16 October 2003 (aged 21)	Paris Saint-Germain	2020	2026	79	2
21	Vanessa Gilles	(Canada)	DF	11 March 1996 (aged 29)	on loan from Angel City	2022	2025	85	19
23	Sofie Svava	(Denmark)	DF	11 August 2000 (aged 24)	Real Madrid	2024	2027	27	0
33	Tarciane	(Brazil)	DF	27 May 2003 (aged 21)	Houston Dash	2025	2029	7	0
37	Louna Belhout Achi	(Haiti)	DF	11 January 2005 (aged 20)	Academy	2023		1	0
39	Sarah Rougeron	(France)	DF	19 June 2006 (aged 18)	Academy	2024		0	0
44	Romane Rafalski	(France)	DF	3 March 2007 (aged 18)	Academy	2024		1	0
Midfielders
6	Melchie Dumornay	(Haiti)	MF	17 August 2003 (aged 21)	Stade de Reims	2023	2029	48	32
7	Amel Majri	(France)	MF	25 January 1993 (aged 32)	Academy	2010	2026	322	97
8	Sara Däbritz	(Germany)	MF	15 February 1995 (aged 30)	Paris Saint-Germain	2022	2025	76	27
10	Dzsenifer Marozsán	(Germany)	MF	18 April 1992 (aged 33)	Eintracht Frankfurt	2016	2025	234	66
13	Damaris Egurrola	(Netherlands)	MF	26 August 1999 (aged 25)	Everton	2021	2027	123	7
17	Daniëlle van de Donk	(Netherlands)	MF	5 August 1991 (aged 33)	Arsenal	2021	2025	109	23
26	Lindsey Horan	(United States)	MF	26 May 1994 (aged 30)	Portland Thorns	2023	2026	92	30
34	Sofia Bekhaled	(France)	MF	26 October 2006 (aged 18)	Academy	2023		2	0
36	Charline Coutel	(France)	MF	12 June 2006 (aged 18)	Academy	2024		1	0
38	Ambre Ouazar	(France)	MF	9 April 2007 (aged 18)	Academy	2023		2	0
41	Aalyah Samadi	(France)	MF	1 May 2007 (aged 18)	Academy	2024		1	0
43	Lorna Chicha Douvier	(France)	MF	11 February 2006 (aged 19)	Academy	2024		1	0
	Laureen Oillic	(France)	MF	3 May 2005 (aged 20)	Academy	2023		3	0
Forwards
9	Eugénie Le Sommer	(France)	FW	18 May 1989 (aged 35)	Stade Briochin	2010	2025	429	313
11	Kadidiatou Diani	(France)	FW	1 April 1995 (aged 30)	Paris Saint-Germain	2023	2027	63	34
14	Ada Hegerberg	(Norway)	FW	10 July 1995 (aged 29)	Turbine Potsdam	2014	2027	268	271
22	Tabitha Chawinga	(Malawi)	FW	22 May 1996 (aged 28)	Wuhan Jianghan University	2024	2027	29	9
25	Inès Benyahia	(France)	FW	26 March 2003 (aged 22)	Academy	2020	2026	29	3
27	Vicki Bècho	(France)	FW	3 October 2003 (aged 21)	Paris Saint-Germain	2020	2027	86	14
35	Leila Wandeler	(Switzerland)	FW	11 April 2006 (aged 19)	Academy	2023		3	1
Out on loan
15	Wassa Sangare	(France)	DF	16 March 2006 (aged 19)	Academy	2023	2027	5	0
19	Kysha Sylla	(France)	DF	4 February 2004 (aged 21)	Academy	2021	2027	9	0
23	Julie Swierot	(France)	MF	14 March 2006 (aged 19)	Academy	2023	2027	3	0
24	Alice Marques	(Portugal)	DF	4 May 2005 (aged 20)	Academy	2023	2026	2	1
31	Liana Joseph	(France)	FW	15 August 2006 (aged 18)	Academy	2023	2026	4	1
32	Maeline Mendy	(France)	MF	26 December 2006 (aged 18)	Academy	2023	2027	7	2
Left during the season

== Transfers ==
=== In ===
Date	Position	Nationality	Name	From	Fee	Ref.
24 June 2024	DF	(Denmark)	Sofie Svava	Real Madrid	Undisclosed	
2 July 2024	FW	(Malawi)	Tabitha Chawinga	Wuhan Jianghan University	Undisclosed	
3 January 2025	DF	(Sweden)	Elma Junttila Nelhage	BK Häcken	Undisclosed	
2 February 2025	DF	(Brazil)	Tarciane	Houston Dash	Undisclosed	

=== Loans in ===
Start date	Position	Nationality	Name	From	End date	Ref.
12 September 2024	DF	(United States)	Sofia Huerta	Seattle Reign	30 June 2025	

=== Out ===
Date	Position	Nationality	Name	To	Fee	Ref.
12 July 2024	FW	(France)	Melvine Malard	Manchester United	Undisclosed	

=== Loans out ===
Start date	Position	Nationality	Name	To	End date	Ref.
15 July 2024	DF	(Portugal)	Alice Marques	Valencia	30 June 2025	
1 August 2024	MF	(France)	Julie Swierot	Reims	30 June 2025	
15 January 2025	MF	(France)	Maeline Mendy	Strasbourg Alsace	30 June 2025	
15 January 2025	FW	(France)	Liana Joseph	Strasbourg Alsace	30 June 2025	
16 January 2025	DF	(France)	Wassa Sangare	Le Havre	30 June 2025	
6 February 2025	DF	(France)	Kysha Sylla	Washington Spirit	31 December 2025	

=== Released ===
Date	Position	Nationality	Name	Joined	Date	Ref.
30 June 2025	GK	(Germany)	Laura Benkarth	Freiburg	17 May 2025	
30 June 2025	GK	(Switzerland)	Yasmine Ammar	Zürich		
30 June 2025	DF	(Haiti)	Louna Belhout Achi	Lille		
30 June 2025	MF	(France)	Laureen Oillic	Lens		
30 June 2025	MF	(Germany)	Sara Däbritz	Real Madrid	19 June 2025	
30 June 2025	MF	(Germany)	Dzsenifer Marozsán	Al Qadsiah	10 August 2025	
30 June 2025	MF	(Netherlands)	Daniëlle van de Donk	London City Lionesses	20 June 2025	
30 June 2025	FW	(France)	Eugénie Le Sommer	Deportivo Toluca	27 June 2025	

== Friendlies ==
31 August 2024	Olympique Lyonnais	2–0	Real Madrid	Décines-Charpieu
12:00 CEST (UTC+2)	van de Donk 9'; Sangare (yellow card) 19'; Diani 38'	Report		Stadium: Groupama OL Training Center

7 September 2024	Olympique Lyonnais	4–2	Juventus	Bourgoin-Jallieu
17:00 CEST (UTC+2)	Le Sommer 11'; Chawinga 14'; Dumornay 30' van de Donk 35'; Marozsán (yellow card) 50'; Bècho (yellow card) 80'	Report	Krumbiegel 38'; Girelli 61'	Stadium: Stade Pierre Rajon

14 September 2024	Olympique Lyonnais	8–0	Vllaznia	Décines-Charpieu
19:30 CEST (UTC+2)	Bècho 4', 64'; Diani 8'; Däbritz 9', 23'; Horan 65', 80'; Carpenter 65'	Report		Stadium: Groupama OL Training Center

== Competitions ==
=== Overview ===
Competition	First match	Last match	Starting round	Final position	Record							
Competition	First match	Last match	Starting round	Final position	Pld	W	D	L	GF	GA	GD	Win %
Première Ligue	20 September 2024	16 May 2025	16 May 2025	Winners	24	22	2	0	99	8	+91	91.67
Coupe de France	12 January 2025	12 January 2025	Round of 32	Round of 32	1	0	1	0	0	0	+0	0.00
UEFA Champions League	8 October 2024	27 April 2025	Group Stage	Semi-finals	10	9	0	1	28	7	+21	90.00
Total					35	31	3	1	127	15	+112	88.57

Last updated: 16 May 2025
Source: Competitions

=== Première Ligue ===
==== Regular season ====
===== Table =====
Pos	Team	Pld	W	D	L	GF	GA	GD	Pts	Qualification or relegation
1	Lyon (C)	22	20	2	0	92	7	+85	62	Qualification for the play-offs
2	Paris Saint-Germain	22	16	4	2	57	14	+43	52	Qualification for the play-offs
3	Paris FC	22	13	6	3	58	19	+39	45	Qualification for the play-offs
4	Dijon	22	13	4	5	40	24	+16	43	Qualification for the play-offs
5	Fleury	22	9	6	7	40	30	+10	33	

Source: FFF.fr
Rules for classification: 1) points; 2) head-to-head points; 3) head-to-head goal difference; 4) goal difference; 5) goals scored
(C) Champions

===== Results summary =====
Overall								Home						Away					
Pld	W	D	L	GF	GA	GD	Pts	W	D	L	GF	GA	GD	W	D	L	GF	GA	GD
22	20	2	0	92	7	+85	62	10	1	0	52	4	+48	10	1	0	40	3	+37

Last updated: 7 May 2025.

===== Results by matchday =====
Matchday	1	2	3	4	5	6	7	8	9	10	11	12	13	14	15	16	17	18	19	20	21	22
Ground	A	H	H	A	A	H	A	H	A	A	H	H	A	A	H	A	H	A	H	H	A	H
Result	W	W	W	W	D	W	W	W	W	W	W	W	W	W	W	W	W	W	W	D	W	W
Position	2	2	1	1	1	1	1	1	1	1	1	1	1	1	1	1	1	1	1	1	1	1

Updated to match(es) played on 7 May 2025. Source: Results
A = Away; H = Home; W = Win; D = Draw; L = Loss; P = Postponed

===== Results =====
20 September 2024 1	Fleury 91	2–6	Olympique Lyonnais	Fleury-Mérogis
21:00 CEST (UTC+2)	Kamczyk 1', 46'	Report	Marozsán (yellow card) 13'; Dumornay 22', 43'; Horan 32', 57'; Svava (yellow card) 69'; Gilles 75'; Diani 80'	Stadium: Stade Auguste Gentelet; Referee: Alexandra Collin

27 September 2024 2	Olympique Lyonnais	6–0	Strasbourg Alsace	Décines-Charpieu
21:00 CEST (UTC+2)	van de Donk 17'; Horan 38', 90'; Diani 44'; Chawinga 52'; Dumornay 58'	Report	Neller (yellow card) 73'	Stadium: Stade Gérard Houllier; Referee: Elisa Daupeux

5 October 2024 3	Olympique Lyonnais	4–0	Montpellier HSC	Bourg-en-Bresse
21:00 CEST (UTC+2)	Renard 38'; Däbritz (yellow card) 62' (goal) 79'; Horan 63'; Dumornay 64'	Report	Rambaud (yellow card) 84'	Stadium: Stade Marcel-Verchère; Referee: Emeline Rochebiliere

12 October 2024 4	Dijon FCO	0–3	Olympique Lyonnais	Dijon
14:30 CEST (UTC+2)		Report	McGrady 14' (o.g.); Diani 25'; Le Sommer 73'	Stadium: Stade Gaston-Gérard; Referee: Cecile Bessiere

20 October 2024 5	Paris FC	0–0	Olympique Lyonnais	Paris
15:00 CEST (UTC+2)	N'Dongala (yellow card) 32'	Report		Stadium: Stade Sébastien Charléty; Referee: Maïka Vanderstichel

3 November 2024 6	Olympique Lyonnais	1–0	Paris Saint-Germain	Décines-Charpieu
14:00 CET (UTC+1)	Chawinga 27'	Report	Traoré (yellow card) 31'; Le Guilly (yellow card) 45'; Albert (yellow card) 57'	Stadium: Stade Gérard Houllier; Referee: Elisa Daupeux

8 November 2024 7	EA Guingamp	0–8	Olympique Lyonnais	Pabu
21:00 CET (UTC+1)	Kazadi (yellow card) 55'	Report	van de Donk 6'; Dumornay 8', 45'; Chawinga 49', 50', 65'; Mendy 66'; Majri 74'; Carpenter (yellow card) 79'	Stadium: Complexe Sportif Akademi Eag 1 Referee: Maïka Vanderstichel

16 November 2024 8	Olympique Lyonnais	11–0	AS Saint-Étienne	Décines-Charpieu
21:00 CET (UTC+1)	Horan 12', 14', 35', 48', 52', 67'; Chawinga 79' van de Donk 88', 90'; Dumornay 90'; Diani 90'	Report		Stadium: Stade Gérard Houllier; Referee: Audrey Gerbel

23 November 2024 9	Le Havre	0–3	Olympique Lyonnais	Le Havre
17:00 CET (UTC+1)	Cance (yellow card) 88'	Report	Majri 44'; Le Sommer 66'; Bècho 82'	Stadium: Stade Océane; Referee: Savina El Bour

6 December 2024 10	Stade de Reims	0–3	Olympique Lyonnais	Betheny
21:00 CET (UTC+1)	Ndzana (yellow card) 86'	Report	Dumornay 13', 90'; Svava (yellow card) 16'; Hegerberg 77'	Stadium: Stade Blériot 2 Referee: Cecile Bessiere

14 December 2024 11	Olympique Lyonnais	5–1	Nantes	Décines-Charpieu
21:00 CET (UTC+1)	Dumornay 11', 24'; Horan 22'; Gilles 31' (yellow card) 44'; Majri 74'	Report	Robillard 53'; Fremaux (yellow card) 55'; Ould Braham (yellow card) 65'	Stadium: Stade Gérard Houllier; Referee: Emeline Rochebiliere

8 January 2025 12	Olympique Lyonnais	2–0	Dijon FCO	Décines-Charpieu
21:00 CET (UTC+1)	Gilles 28' van de Donk 43'; Le Sommer (yellow card) 52'	Report		Stadium: Stade Gérard Houllier; Referee: Victoria Beyer

18 January 2025 13	Paris Saint-Germain	0–2	Olympique Lyonnais	Paris
21:00 CET (UTC+1)	De Almeida (yellow card) 78'	Report	Dumornay 7'; Diani 31'; Egurrola (yellow card) 44'; Renard (yellow card) 83'	Stadium: Parc des Princes; Referee: Alexandra Collin

31 January 2025 14	Montpellier HSC	1–4	Olympique Lyonnais	Montpellier
21:00 CET (UTC+1)	Louis (yellow card) 21'; Ouchene 45'	Report	Renard 30'; Majri 37'; Horan 45'; Däbritz 58'	Stadium: Stade Bernard Gasset – Mama Ouattara; Referee: Audrey Gerbel

15 February 2025 15	Olympique Lyonnais	7–0	EA Guingamp	Décines-Charpieu
17:00 CET (UTC+1)	Gilles 10'; Dumornay 30'; Diani 36', 59', 62' (yellow card) 54' van de Donk 69'; Huerta 72'	Report		Stadium: Stade Gérard Houllier; Referee: Agathe Kocher

1 March 2025 16	Strasbourg Alsace	0–4	Olympique Lyonnais	Strasbourg
21:00 CET (UTC+1)		Report	Le Sommer 6'; Marozsán (yellow card) 52'; Renard 62'; Dumornay 64'; Chawinga 90'	Stadium: Stade Jean-Nicolas Muller; Referee: Emeline Rochebiliere

14 March 2025 17	Olympique Lyonnais	8–1	Stade de Reims	Décines-Charpieu
21:00 CET (UTC+1)	Hegerberg 5', 90'; Renard 38'; Dumornay 47'; Däbritz 64'; Carpenter 77', 90'; Bècho 90'	Report	Le Moguédec 13'; Nassi (yellow card) 33'	Stadium: Stade Gérard Houllier; Referee: Cecile Bessiere

22 March 2025 18	AS Saint-Étienne	0–5	Olympique Lyonnais	Saint-Étienne
21:00 CET (UTC+1)	Champagnac (yellow card) 30'; Lamontagne (yellow card) 69'; Bataillard (yellow card) 72'	Report	Le Sommer 9'; Marozsán (yellow card) 16'; Hegerberg 36'; Däbritz 45'; Gilles 51'; Dumornay 74'	Stadium: Stade Salif-Keita; Referee: Victoria Beyer

30 March 2025 19	Olympique Lyonnais	4–0	Fleury 91	Décines-Charpieu
17:30 CET (UTC+1)	Dumornay (yellow card) 4'; Le Sommer 32', 43'; Majri (yellow card) 54'; Diani 77'	Report	Traoré (yellow card) 52'	Stadium: Stade Gérard Houllier; Referee: Maïka Vanderstichel

12 April 2025 20	Olympique Lyonnais	2–2	Paris FC	Décines-Charpieu
14:30 CEST (UTC+2)	Egurrola 15'; Le Sommer (yellow card) 60'; Majri 76'	Report	Matéo 46'; Bourdieu 90'	Stadium: Stade Gérard Houllier; Referee: Emeline Rochebiliere

23 April 2025 21	Nantes	0–2	Olympique Lyonnais	Nantes
21:00 CEST (UTC+2)		Report	Däbritz 39'; Wandeler 74'; Coutel (yellow card) 83'	Stadium: Stade Marcel-Saupin; Referee: Cecile Bessiere

7 May 2025 22	Olympique Lyonnais	2–0	Le Havre	Décines-Charpieu
17:00 CEST (UTC+2)	Däbritz 61'; Le Sommer 75'; Tarciane (yellow card) 84'	Report	Adjabi (yellow card) 53'	Stadium: Stade Gérard Houllier; Referee: Romy Fournier

==== Playoffs ====
11 May 2025 Semifinal	Olympique Lyonnais	4–1	Dijon FCO	Décines-Charpieu
15:15 CEST (UTC+2)	Le Sommer 19'; Horan 45'; Diani (yellow card) 58'; Gilles 62'; Hegerberg 87'	Report	Vairon (yellow card) 53'; Pinther 89'	Stadium: Stade Gérard Houllier; Referee: Maika Vanderstichel

16 May 2025 Final	Olympique Lyonnais	3–0	Paris Saint-Germain	Décines-Charpieu
CEST (UTC+2)	Dumornay 45'; Diani 80'; Renard 90'	Report	Hurtré (yellow card) 81'	Stadium: Parc Olympique Lyonnais; Referee: Alexandra Collin

=== Coupe de France ===
12 January 2025 Round of 32	Stade de Reims	0–0 (10–9 p)	Olympique Lyonnais	Bétheny
17:00 CET (UTC+1)	Ndzana (yellow card) 37'; Ngock (yellow card) 81'	Report	Bècho (yellow card) 55'; Egurrola (yellow card) 76'; Sombath (yellow card) 94'	Stadium: Stade Louis Blériot 2 Referee: Romy Fournier
	Penalties
	Calba (penalty scored); Corboz (penalty scored); Kack (penalty missed); Le Moguédec (penalty scored); Boucly (penalty scored); White (penalty scored); Maoulida (penalty scored); Gyau (penalty scored); Adamek (penalty scored); Haelewyn (penalty scored); Massey (penalty scored)		(penalty scored) Horan; (penalty missed) Hegerberg; (penalty scored) Diani; (penalty scored) Egurrola; (penalty scored) Le Sommer; (penalty scored) Huerta; (penalty scored) Carpenter; (penalty scored) Gilles; (penalty scored) Sombath; (penalty scored) Chawinga; (penalty missed) Benkarth

=== UEFA Champions League ===
==== Group stage ====
Pos	Team	Pld	W	D	L	GF	GA	GD	Pts	Qualification
1	(France) Lyon	6	6	0	0	19	1	+18	18	Advance to quarter-finals
2	(Germany) VfL Wolfsburg	6	3	0	3	16	5	+11	9 (Note: Wolfsburg 3 Pts, +4 GD; Roma 3 Pts, −4 GD.)	Advance to quarter-finals
3	(Italy) Roma	6	3	0	3	12	14	−2	9	
4	(Turkey) Galatasaray	6	0	0	6	1	28	−27	0	

Source: UEFA
Rules for classification: Group stage tiebreakers
Notes:

8 October 2024 1	Olympique Lyonnais (France)	3–0	(Turkey) Galatasaray	Décines-Charpieu, France
18:45 CET (UTC+1)	Diani 34', 77'; Gilles 45'	Report		Stadium: Parc Olympique Lyonnais; Attendance: 3,650; Referee: Michalina Diakow (Poland)

17 October 2024 2	VfL Wolfsburg (Germany)	0–2	(France) Olympique Lyonnais	Wolfsburg, Germany
21:00 CET (UTC+1)	Minge (yellow card) 35'; Huth (yellow card) 90+1'	Report	Renard 8'; Marozsán (yellow card) 10'; Horan 53' (pen.)	Stadium: AOK Stadion; Attendance: 2,403; Referee: Désirée Grundbacher (Switzerland)

13 November 2024 3	AS Roma (Italy)	0–3	(France) Olympique Lyonnais	Rome, Italy
21:00 CET (UTC+1)		Report	Dumornay 36', 42'; Gilles 52' (yellow card) 90+1'; Egurrola (yellow card) 55'; Svava (yellow card) 60'	Stadium: Stadio Tre Fontane; Attendance: 1,906; Referee: Abigail Byrne (England)

20 November 2024 4	Olympique Lyonnais (France)	4–1	(Italy) AS Roma	Décines-Charpieu, France
21:00 CET (UTC+1)	Diani 77', 79'; Le Sommer 89'; Renard 90+2'	Report	Dragoni 74'	Stadium: Parc Olympique Lyonnais; Attendance: 4,060; Referee: Marta Huerta de Aza (Spain)

11 December 2024 5	Galatasaray (Turkey)	0–6	(France) Olympique Lyonnais	Istanbul, Turkey
18:45 CET (UTC+1)	Demehin (yellow card) 85'	Report	Hegerberg 19'; Däbritz 24'; Jackmon 34' (o.g.); Renard 49'; Van de Donk 69'; Le Sommer 76'	Stadium: Atatürk Olympic Stadium; Attendance: 550; Referee: Catarina Campos (Portugal)

17 December 2024 6	Olympique Lyonnais (France)	1–0	(Germany) VfL Wolfsburg	Décines-Charpieu, France
21:00 CET (UTC+1)	van de Donk 81'	Report		Stadium: Parc Olympique Lyonnais; Attendance: 3,700; Referee: Alina Peşu (Romania)

==== Knockout stage ====
18 March 2025 Quarter-final 1st leg	Bayern Munich (Germany)	0–2	(France) Olympique Lyonnais	Munich, Germany
21:00 CET (UTC+1)	Zadrazil (yellow card) 45+4'	Report	Chawinga 35'; Horan (penalty missed) 45+5'; Dumornay 65'	Stadium: FC Bayern Campus; Attendance: 2,500; Referee: Olatz Rivera Olmedo (Spain)

26 March 2025 Quarter-final 2nd leg	Olympique Lyonnais (France)	4–1 (6–1 agg.)	(Germany) Bayern Munich	Décines-Charpieu, France
18:45 CET (UTC+1)	Dumornay 46'; Diani 54'; Chawinga 60'; Hegerberg 90+4'	Report	Bühl 33'; Simon (yellow card) 52'; Hansen (yellow card) 87'	Stadium: Parc Olympique Lyonnais; Attendance: 13,947; Referee: Iuliana Elena Demetrescu (Romania)

19 April 2025 Semi-final 1st leg	Arsenal (England)	1–2	(France) Olympique Lyonnais	Holloway, England
13:30 CET (UTC+1)	Foord (yellow card) 3'; Little (yellow card) 55'; Caldentey 78' (pen.)	Report	Diani 17'; Endler (yellow card) 76'; Dumornay 82'	Stadium: Emirates Stadium; Attendance: 40,045; Referee: Alina Peşu (Romania)

27 April 2025 Semi-final 2nd leg	Olympique Lyonnais (France)	1–4 (3–5 agg.)	(England) Arsenal	Décines-Charpieu, France
18:00 CET (UTC+1)	Egurrola (yellow card) 60'; Dumornay 81'	Report	Endler 5' (o.g.); Caldentey 45+1'; Russo 46'; Foord 63' van Domselaar (yellow card) 87'	Stadium: Parc Olympique Lyonnais; Attendance: 20,015; Referee: Maria Caputi (Italy)

== Squad statistics ==
As of match played 16 May 2025

=== Appearances ===
No.	Pos	Nat	Player	Total		Première Ligue		Coupe de France		UEFA Champions League	
No.	Pos	Nat	Player	Apps	Goals	Apps	Goals	Apps	Goals	Apps	Goals
1	GK	(Chile) CHI	Christiane Endler	30	0	20	0	0	0	10	0
2	DF	(United States) USA	Sofia Huerta	18	1	9+5	1	0+1	0	0+3	0
3	DF	(France) FRA	Wendie Renard	26	8	16+1	5	0	0	9	3
4	DF	(France) FRA	Selma Bacha	18	0	6+6	0	0	0	6	0
5	DF	(Sweden) SWE	Elma Junttila Nelhage	4	0	1+3	0	0	0	0	0
6	MF	(Haiti) HAI	Melchie Dumornay	28	22	17+2	17	0	0	9	5
7	MF	(France) FRA	Amel Majri	23	6	7+8	6	0	0	0+8	0
8	MF	(Germany) GER	Sara Däbritz	28	7	11+9	6	1	0	1+6	1
9	FW	(France) FRA	Eugénie Le Sommer	28	10	11+8	8	0+1	0	0+8	2
10	MF	(Germany) GER	Dzsenifer Marozsán	27	0	10+9	0	0	0	7+1	0
11	FW	(France) FRA	Kadidiatou Diani	30	16	15+4	10	0+1	0	9+1	6
12	DF	(Australia) AUS	Ellie Carpenter	29	2	17+1	2	1	0	10	0
13	MF	(Netherlands) NED	Damaris Egurrola	29	1	17+1	1	0+1	0	9+1	0
14	FW	(Norway) NOR	Ada Hegerberg	23	7	2+13	5	1	0	3+4	2
16	GK	(France) FRA	Feerine Belhadj	1	0	0+1	0	0	0	0	0
17	MF	(Netherlands) NED	Daniëlle van de Donk	28	8	13+6	6	1	0	4+4	2
18	DF	(France) FRA	Alice Sombath	17	0	7+6	0	1	0	2+1	0
21	DF	(Canada) CAN	Vanessa Gilles	29	8	18+1	6	1	0	9	2
22	FW	(Malawi) MAW	Tabitha Chawinga	29	9	13+6	7	1	0	9	2
23	DF	(Denmark) DEN	Sofie Svava	27	0	16+4	0	1	0	4+2	0
25	FW	(France) FRA	Inès Benyahia	3	0	1+2	0	0	0	0	0
26	MF	(United States) USA	Lindsey Horan	28	16	15+2	14	1	0	9+1	2
27	FW	(France) FRA	Vicki Bècho	19	2	8+6	2	1	0	0+4	0
30	GK	(Germany) GER	Laura Benkarth	5	0	4	0	1	0	0	0
33	DF	(Brazil) BRA	Tarciane	7	0	3+4	0	0	0	0	0
34	MF	(France) FRA	Sofia Bekhaled	1	0	1	0	0	0	0	0
35	FW	(Switzerland) SUI	Leila Wandeler	1	1	1	1	0	0	0	0
36	MF	(France) FRA	Charline Coutel	1	0	0+1	0	0	0	0	0
38	MF	(France) FRA	Ambre Ouazar	1	0	1	0	0	0	0	0
41	MF	(France) FRA	Aalyah Samadi	1	0	0+1	0	0	0	0	0
43	MF	(France) FRA	Lorna Chicha Douvier	1	0	0+1	0	0	0	0	0
44	DF	(France) FRA	Romane Rafalski	1	0	0+1	0	0	0	0	0
Players away from the club on loan:
19	DF	(France) FRA	Kysha Sylla	2	0	0+2	0	0	0	0	0
31	FW	(France) FRA	Liana Joseph	1	0	0+1	0	0	0	0	0
32	MF	(France) FRA	Maeline Mendy	2	1	0+2	1	0	0	0	0
Players who appeared for Olympique Lyonnais but left during the season:

=== Goal scorers ===
Place	Position	Nation	Number	Name	Première Ligue	Coupe de France	UEFA Champions League	Total
1	MF	(Haiti)	6	Melchie Dumornay	17	0	5	22
2	MF	(United States)	26	Lindsey Horan	14	0	2	16
2	FW	(France)	11	Kadidiatou Diani	10	0	6	16
4	FW	(France)	9	Eugénie Le Sommer	8	0	2	10
5	FW	(Malawi)	22	Tabitha Chawinga	7	0	2	9
6	MF	(Netherlands)	17	Daniëlle van de Donk	6	0	2	8
6	DF	(Canada)	21	Vanessa Gilles	6	0	2	8
6	DF	(France)	3	Wendie Renard	5	0	3	8
9	MF	(Germany)	8	Sara Däbritz	6	0	1	7
9	FW	(Norway)	14	Ada Hegerberg	5	0	2	7
11	MF	(France)	7	Amel Majri	6	0	0	6
12	FW	(France)	27	Vicki Bècho	2	0	0	2
12	DF	(Australia)	12	Ellie Carpenter	2	0	0	2
12				Own goal	1	0	1	2
15	MF	(France)	32	Maeline Mendy	1	0	0	1
15	DF	(United States)	2	Sofia Huerta	1	0	0	1
15	MF	(Netherlands)	13	Damaris Egurrola	1	0	0	1
15	MF	(Switzerland)	35	Leila Wandeler	1	0	0	1
Total					99	0	28	127

=== Clean sheets ===
Place	Position	Nation	Number	Name	Première Ligue	Coupe de France	UEFA Champions League	Total
1	GK	(Chile)	1	Christiane Endler	15	0	6	22
2	GK	(Germany)	30	Laura Benkarth	3	1	0	4
3	GK	(France)	16	Feerine Belhadj	1	0	0	1
Total					16	1	6	23

Laura Benkarth & Feerine Belhadj both played in Olympique Lyonnais' 2–0 victory over Nantes on 23 April 2025

=== Disciplinary record ===
Number	Nation	Position	Name	Première Ligue		Coupe de France		UEFA Champions League		Total	
Number	Nation	Position	Name	Booked	Sent off (straight red)	Booked	Sent off (straight red)	Booked	Sent off (straight red)	Booked	Sent off (straight red)
1	(Chile)	GK	Christiane Endler	0	0	0	0	1	0	1	0
3	(France)	DF	Wendie Renard	1	0	0	0	0	0	1	0
6	(Haiti)	MF	Melchie Dumornay	1	0	0	0	0	0	1	0
8	(Germany)	MF	Sara Däbritz	1	0	0	0	0	0	1	0
9	(France)	FW	Eugénie Le Sommer	2	0	0	0	0	0	2	0
10	(Germany)	MF	Dzsenifer Marozsán	3	0	0	0	1	0	4	0
11	(France)	FW	Kadidiatou Diani	2	0	0	0	0	0	2	0
12	(Australia)	DF	Ellie Carpenter	1	0	0	0	0	0	1	0
13	(Netherlands)	MF	Damaris Egurrola	1	0	1	0	2	0	4	0
18	(France)	DF	Alice Sombath	0	0	1	0	0	0	1	0
21	(Canada)	DF	Vanessa Gilles	1	0	0	0	1	0	2	0
23	(Denmark)	DF	Sofie Svava	2	0	0	0	1	0	3	0
27	(France)	FW	Vicki Bècho	0	0	1	0	0	0	1	0
33	(Brazil)	DF	Tarciane	1	0	0	0	0	0	1	0
36	(France)	MF	Charline Coutel	1	0	0	0	0	0	1	0
Players away on loan:
Players who left Olympique Lyonnais during the season:
Total				16	0	3	0	6	0	25	0
