= Melchie Dumornay =

Haitian footballer (born 2003)

Personal information
- Full name: Melchie Daëlle Dumornay
- Date of birth: 17 August 2003 (age 23)
- Place of birth: Mirebalais, Haiti
- Height: 1.60 m (5 ft 3 in)
- Position: Midfielder

Team information
- Current team: Lyon
- Number: 6

Youth career
- AS Mirebalais
- –2018: AS Tigresses

Senior career*
Years	Team	Apps	(Gls)
2018–2021	AS Tigresses	16	(37)
2021–2023	Reims	33	(18)
2023–	Lyon	48	(33)

International career^{‡}
2016	Haiti U15	5	(13)
2017–2018	Haiti U17	7	(10)
2018–2020	Haiti U20	11	(15)
2019–	Haiti	20	(20)
- * Club domestic league appearances and goals as of 23:37, 25 October 2026 (UTC) ‡ National team caps and goals as of 13:48, 30 April 2024 (UTC)

Melchie Daëlle Dumornay (born 17 August 2003), also known as Corventina, is a Haitian professional footballer who plays as a midfielder or forward for Première Ligue club Lyon and the Haiti national team.

In an article posted on the official Olympics website, Dumornay is referred to as "an anomaly" and "one of the best football players on the planet".

== Club career ==
=== Early life and AS Tigresses ===
Dumornay was born in Mirebalais, where she was raised by a single mother together with her three brothers and two cousins. Shortly after she started playing football with older boys in the commune's streets, she joined her first women's football club, AS Mirebalais. Having been impressed by Dumornay's talent, the club's coach, Jean-Claude Josaphat, brought her to Camp Nous, the federation-owned training center for all of the Haitian youth national teams, when she was only 10 years old.

A few years later, Dumornay joined fellow Haitian club AS Tigresses, where she came through the youth ranks. In the final of the 2018 Haitian Women's Soccer Championship, she scored all of the five goals that helped Tigresses gain a 5–2 win over Anacaona SC and win the national title. Having scored 25 goals in nine matches, despite being just 15 years old, she also became the league's top scorer and received the Best Player award.

In the same year, Dumornay was noticed by Reims' manager, Amandine Miquel, while performing at the FIFA U-20 Women's World Cup in France, as the club eventually kept scouting her. Meanwhile, she was also offered a trial by fellow French club Lyon. However, neither of the two clubs were able to sign the player because of her non-EU and underage status at the time, as well as the effects of the Haitian crisis.

In May 2021, Dumornay reached another league final with Tigresses, although the team eventually lost the title to Exafoot: she scored her side's only goal in a 2–1 defeat.

=== Reims ===
After attracting the interest of several high-profile clubs all around the world, on 9 September 2021, Dumornay officially joined Reims on a permanent deal, signing her first professional contract with the French club. In the process, she re-united with fellow Haitian footballer Kethna Louis.

On 2 October of the same year, she made her professional debut for Reims, coming on as a substitute at half-time of a Division 1 Féminine match against Issy: in the same occasion, she provided two assists for Kessya Bussy, thus helping her side gain a 3–1 win. One week later, on 9 October, she made her first start against Bordeaux, scoring a brace and serving an assist in a 5–2 victory.

In the following season, Dumornay was awarded as Division 1 Féminine Player of the Month in December 2022.

=== Lyon ===
On 16 January 2023, it was officially announced that Dumornay would join Division 1 Féminine title holders Lyon on a permanent deal starting from 1 July 2023, as she signed a contract until June 2026. In two seasons at Lyon, Dumornay has helped the club win two league titles, a Coupe de France Féminine, and make it to the finals of the Women's Champions League in 2024.

== International career ==
=== Youth level ===
Dumornay represented Haiti at various youth international levels.

After taking part in the 2016 CONCACAF Girls' U-15 Championship, aged only 12, she took part in three different tournaments throughout 2018. Firstly, she played in the 2018 CONCACAF Women's U-20 Championship, where Haiti finished third and became the first-ever Caribbean national team to qualify for a FIFA U-20 Women's World Cup. Secondly, she was called up for the 2018 CONCACAF Women's U-17 Championship, where she helped the Haitian team reach a fourth-place finish and received the Golden Ball. Finally, in August of the same year, she was included in the Haitian squad that took part in the 2018 FIFA U-20 Women's World Cup.

In 2020, she was involved once again in the CONCACAF Women's U-20 Championship, where she eventually received the Golden Boot, having scored 14 goals in six games, a new record for the competition.

=== Senior level ===
On 29 January 2020, Dumornay made her debut with the Haiti senior national team, starting and playing full 90 minutes in a 4–0 Olympic qualifier loss against the United States.

On 9 April 2022, she scored twice in a 0–21 win over the British Virgin Islands, in the 2022 CONCACAF W Championship qualifiers, which became Les Grenadières' biggest victory ever in an official international match.

In July 2022, she was included in the Haitian squad that took part in the CONCACAF W Championship in Mexico: she was eventually named as the Best Young Player and included in the tournament's Best XI, having helped Haiti qualify for the inter-confederation play-offs for the 2023 FIFA Women's World Cup.

On 21 February 2023, Dumornay scored a brace in the inter-confederation play-off final against Chile, thus helping her nation gain a 2–1 win and qualify for its first ever FIFA Women's World Cup.

In July of the same year, she was officially included in the final Haitian squad for the World Cup in Australia and New Zealand; Les Grenadières eventually exited the competition in the group stage.

== Personal life ==
In the early phases of her career, Dumornay was nicknamed Piti (the Haitian Creole term for "small") due to her diminutive stature. She is also known as Corventina, a nickname that was first given to her by her older brother.

In November 2022, she signed a long-term sponsorship deal with Adidas.

== Career statistics ==
=== Club ===
As of match played 24 October 2026

Appearances and goals by club, season, and competition.
Club	Season	League			National cup (Note: Includes Coupe de France Féminine)		Continental		Other		Total	
Club	Season	Division	Apps	Goals	Apps	Goals	Apps	Goals	Apps	Goals	Apps	Goals
AS Tigresses	2018	Haitian Championship	9	25	0	0	0	0	0	0	9	25
AS Tigresses	2019	Haitian Championship	0	0	0	0	0	0	0	0	0	0
AS Tigresses	2020	Haitian Championship	0	0	0	0	0	0	0	0	0	0
AS Tigresses	2021	Haitian Championship	7	12	0	0	0	0	0	0	7	12
AS Tigresses	Total		16	37	0	0	0	0	0	0	16	37
Reims	2021–22	Division 1 Feminine	15	7	3	2	0	0	0	0	18	9
Reims	2022–23	Division 1 Feminine	18	11	3	3	0	0	0	0	21	14
Reims	Total		33	18	6	5	0	0	0	0	39	23
Lyon	2023–24	Première Ligue	11	5	1	0	5 (Note: Appearances in UEFA Women's Champions League)	2	3 (Note: Two appearances and one goal in Première Ligue play-offs, one appearance and one goal Trophée des Championnes)	2	20	9
Lyon	2024–25	Première Ligue	17	15	0	0	9	6	2 (Note: Appearances in Première Ligue play-offs)	1	28	22
Lyon	2025–26	Première Ligue	15	4	1	1	10	5	5 (Note: Two appearances and five goals in Première Ligue play-offs, three appearances ane one goal in Coupe LFFP)	6	31	16
Lyon	2026–27	Première Ligue	5	9	0	0	2	2	0	0	7	11
Lyon	Total		48	33	2	1	26	15	10	9	86	58
Career total			97	88	8	6	26	15	10	9	141	118

=== International ===
Scores and results list Haiti's goal tally first, score column indicates score after each Dumornay goal.

List of international goals scored by Melchie Dumornay
No.	Date	Venue	Opponent	Score	Result	Competition
1	3 February 2020	BBVA Stadium, Houston, United States	Panama	4–0	6–0	2020 CONCACAF Women's Olympic Qualifying Championship
2	9 April 2022	A. O. Shirley Recreation Ground, Road Town, British Virgin Islands	British Virgin Islands	3–0	21–0	2022 CONCACAF W Championship qualification
3	9 April 2022	A. O. Shirley Recreation Ground, Road Town, British Virgin Islands	British Virgin Islands	4–0	21–0	2022 CONCACAF W Championship qualification
4	9 April 2022	A. O. Shirley Recreation Ground, Road Town, British Virgin Islands	British Virgin Islands	7–0	21–0	2022 CONCACAF W Championship qualification
5	12 April 2022	Estadio Olímpico Félix Sánchez, Santo Domingo, Dominican Republic	Cuba	3–0	6–0	2022 CONCACAF W Championship qualification
6	28 June 2022	Sports Complex Fedefutbol-Plycem, San Rafael, Costa Rica	Costa Rica	3–0	4–2	Friendly
7	28 June 2022	Sports Complex Fedefutbol-Plycem, San Rafael, Costa Rica	Costa Rica	4–2	4–2	Friendly
8	22 February 2023	North Harbour Stadium, Auckland, New Zealand	Chile	1–0	2–1	2023 FIFA Women's World Cup qualification
9	22 February 2023	North Harbour Stadium, Auckland, New Zealand	Chile	2–0	2–1	2023 FIFA Women's World Cup qualification
10	7 April 2023	Marden Sports Complex, Alanya, Turkey	Nigeria	1–2	1–2	Friendly
11	11 April 2023	Marden Sports Complex, Alanya, Turkey	Moldova	2–0	3–1	Friendly
12	26 October 2023	SKNFA Technical Center, Basseterre, St. Kitts and Nevis	Saint Kitts and Nevis	1–0	11–0	2024 CONCACAF W Gold Cup qualification
13	26 October 2023	SKNFA Technical Center, Basseterre, St. Kitts and Nevis	Saint Kitts and Nevis	4–0	11–0	2024 CONCACAF W Gold Cup qualification
14	26 October 2023	SKNFA Technical Center, Basseterre, St. Kitts and Nevis	Saint Kitts and Nevis	5–0	11–0	2024 CONCACAF W Gold Cup qualification
15	26 October 2023	SKNFA Technical Center, Basseterre, St. Kitts and Nevis	Saint Kitts and Nevis	8–0	11–0	2024 CONCACAF W Gold Cup qualification
16	26 October 2023	SKNFA Technical Center, Basseterre, St. Kitts and Nevis	Saint Kitts and Nevis	9–0	11–0	2024 CONCACAF W Gold Cup qualification
17	30 October 2023	SKNFA Technical Center, Basseterre, St. Kitts and Nevis	Saint Kitts and Nevis	3–0	13–0	2024 CONCACAF W Gold Cup qualification
18	30 October 2023	SKNFA Technical Center, Basseterre, St. Kitts and Nevis	Saint Kitts and Nevis	7–0	13–0	2024 CONCACAF W Gold Cup qualification
19	30 October 2023	SKNFA Technical Center, Basseterre, St. Kitts and Nevis	Saint Kitts and Nevis	8–0	13–0	2024 CONCACAF W Gold Cup qualification
20	26 October 2024	Emirhan Sports Complex, Antalya, Turkey	Chinese Taipei	1–2	3–2	2024 Pink Ladies Cup
21	29 October 2024	Emirhan Sports Complex, Antalya, Turkey	Russia	1–1	1–2	2024 Pink Ladies Cup
22	4 April 2025	Estadio Bicentenario de La Florida, Santiago, Chile	Chile	1–0	1–0	Friendly
23	3 June 2025	Saputo Stadium, Montréal, Canada	Canada	1–3	1–3	Friendly
24	30 November 2025	FFB Stadium, Belmopan, Belize	Belize	8–0	9–0	2026 CONCACAF W Championship qualification
25	30 November 2025	FFB Stadium, Belmopan, Belize	Belize	9–0	9–0	2026 CONCACAF W Championship qualification
26	3 March 2026	Dr. Ir. Franklin Essed Stadion, Paramaribo, Suriname	Suriname	2–0	2–0	2026 CONCACAF W Championship qualification
27	5 June 2026	Nuevo Estadio El Maulí, Málaga, Spain	Equatorial Guinea	1–0	3–1	Friendly
28	5 June 2026	Nuevo Estadio El Maulí, Málaga, Spain	Equatorial Guinea	3–0	3–1	Friendly
29	13 October 2026	Stade Walter-Luzi, Chambly, France	Australia	1–1	1–7	Friendly

== Honours ==
Lyon

- Trophée des Championnes: 2023
- Division 1 Féminine: 2023–24, 2024–25

Individual

- CONCACAF Women's Player of the Year: 2023–24, 2024–25
- CONCACAF Women's U-17 Championship Golden Ball: 2018
- CONCACAF Women's U-17 Championship Best XI: 2018
- CONCACAF Women's U-20 Championship Golden Boot: 2020
- CONCACAF W Championship Best Young Player: 2022
- CONCACAF W Championship Best XI: 2022
- UEFA Women's Champions League Young Player of the Season: 2023–24 2024–25
- UEFA Women's Champions League Team of the Season: 2024–25, 2025–26
- UNFP Première Ligue team of the year: 2024–25
- LFFP Première Ligue team of the season: 2024–25
- Première Ligue Player of the Month: December 2022, May 2023, October 2023, March 2025, September 2026, October 2026
