= Elida Kolbjørnsen =

Norwegian footballer (born 2008)

Personal information
- Full name: Elida Holvik Kolbjørnsen
- Date of birth: 8 August 2008 (age 18)
- Place of birth: Norway
- Position: Midfielder

Team information
- Current team: OL Lyonnes
- Number: 36

Youth career
- –2024: Stabæk

Senior career*
Years	Team	Apps	(Gls)
2023–2025	Stabæk 2	30	(2)
2023–2025	Stabæk	17	(2)
2025–	Lyon	0	(0)

International career^{‡}
2023	Norway U15	3	(0)
2024	Norway U16	13	(1)
2025–	Norway U17	13	(1)
- * Club domestic league appearances and goals ‡ National team caps and goals as of 24 October 2025

Elida Holvik Kolbjørnsen (born 8 August 2008) is a Norwegian professional footballer who plays as a midfielder for Lyon.

== Club career ==
As a youth player, Kolbjørnsen joined the youth academy of Norwegian side Stabæk and was promoted to the club's senior team in 2023 and debuted for them at the age of fifteen, becoming the second-youngest player to play in the Norwegian top flight.

Following her stint there, she signed for French side OL ahead of the 2025–26 season.

== International career ==
Kolbjørnsen is a Norway youth international. During the summer of 2025, she played for the Norway women's national under-17 football team at the 2025 UEFA Women's Under-17 Championship.
