= Lily Yohannes =

American soccer player (born 2007)

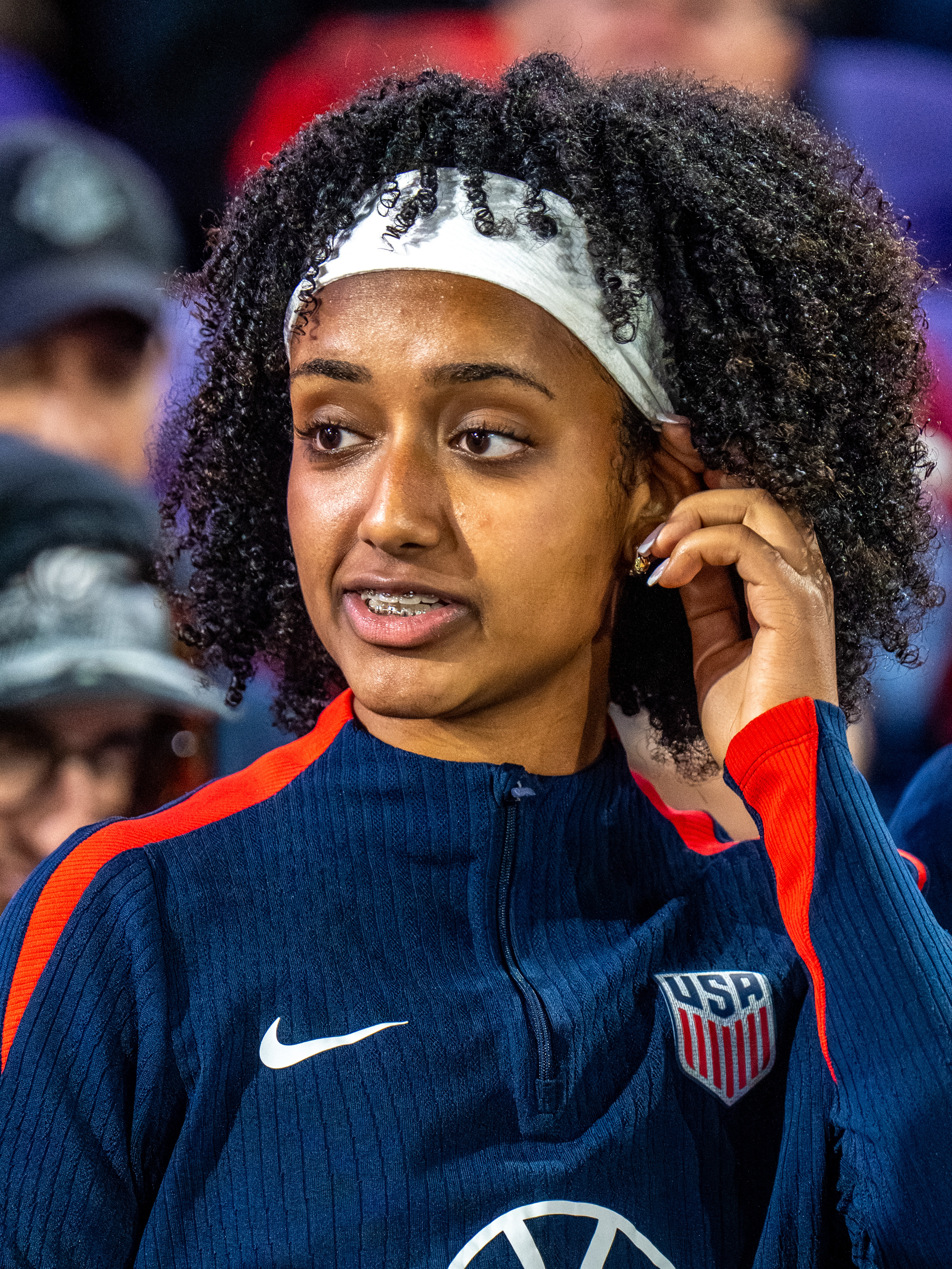
- Yohannes with the United States in 2025

Personal information
- Full name: Lilian Isabella Yohannes
- Date of birth: June 12, 2007 (age 19)
- Place of birth: Springfield, Virginia, United States
- Height: 5 ft 8 in (1.73 m)
- Position: Midfielder

Team information
- Current team: Lyon
- Number: 20

Youth career
- Ajax

Senior career*
Years	Team	Apps	(Gls)
2023–2025	Ajax	39	(11)
2025–	Lyon	22	(4)

International career^{‡}
2024–	United States	22	(1)
- * Club domestic league appearances and goals as of October 9, 2026 ‡ National team caps and goals as of October 13, 2026

Lilian Isabella Yohannes (born June 12, 2007) is an American soccer player who plays as a midfielder for French Première Ligue club Lyon and the United States national team.

== Early life ==
Yohannes was born in Springfield, Virginia to Eritrean parents. She moved to the Netherlands when she was ten years old after her father Daniel accepted a job in Amsterdam. She started her early education at the international school of Almere. Yohannes played youth soccer in the Netherlands and began training weekly with Ajax when she was 13 years old.

== Club career ==
=== Ajax ===
At age 15, Yohannes signed a three-year contract with Ajax in April 2023, lasting through June 2026. On November 15, 2023, aged 16, she became the youngest player ever to start a UEFA Women's Champions League group stage match and the youngest American to play in the competition. Ajax won 2–0 over Paris Saint-Germain. Yohannes was named player of the match in Ajax's 2–1 victory over AS Roma on January 30, 2024.

Yohannes received the Johan Cruyff Talent of the Year award for the 2023–24 Eredivisie season, given to a top player under the age of 20. In her first season in the top Dutch league, she scored 5 goals in 20 matches, helping Ajax finish second and, starting in the final against Fortuna Sittard, win the KNVB Women's Cup in 2024.

Ajax lost in the qualifying rounds of the 2024–25 UEFA Women's Champions League, with Yohannes starting both of the team's matches in Brøndby, Denmark.

=== Lyon ===
On July 7, 2025, French Première Ligue club Lyon announced the signing of Yohannes on a three-year contract, which would run until June 30, 2028. She scored on her debut against Olympique de Marseille on September 7, 2025 in a 3–1 win.

== International career ==
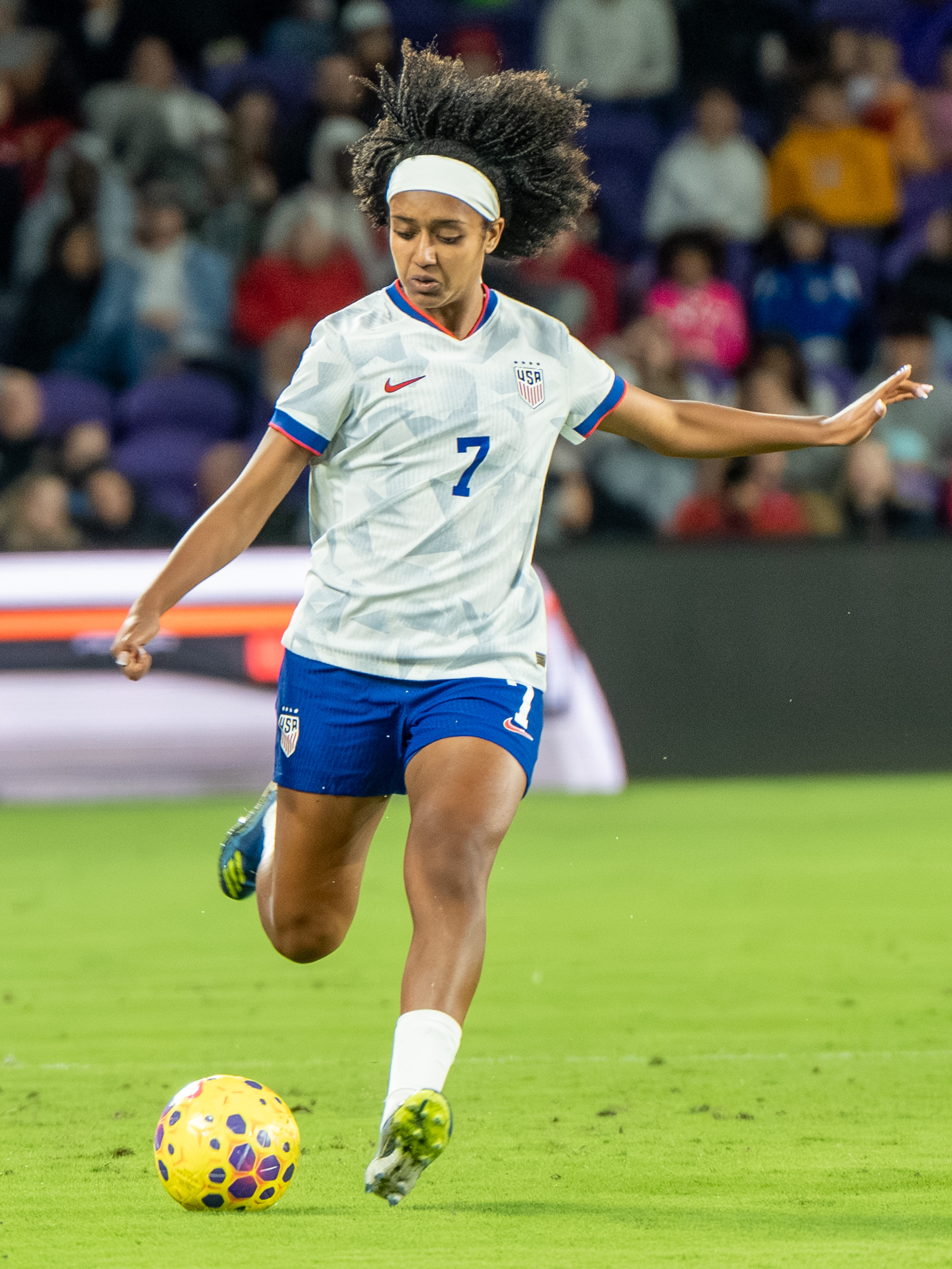
Yohannes with the United States in 2025

Yohannes was eligible for the United States, Netherlands, and Eritrea.

Yohannes trained with the United States youth national team at the under-15 and under-16 level in 2022.

In December 2023, Yohannes attended camp with the Dutch under-19 national team.

In March 2024, at age 16, Yohannes received her first senior United States national team call-up ahead of the 2024 SheBelieves Cup. She became the youngest player to be called in to a senior camp since 16-year-old Sophia Smith in 2017. She made her international debut on June 4, 2024, against South Korea. She entered the game in the 72nd minute and scored her first goal in the 82nd minute. At one week shy of her 17th birthday, Yohannes became the third-youngest goal scorer in USWNT history. Later that month, she was not selected for the United States roster for the 2024 Summer Olympics.

In April 2024, Yohannes said she was applying for Dutch citizenship, which would make her eligible to play for the Dutch national team. She could have changed national teams because her USWNT debut was in a friendly. In September, she said she had not yet decided between the American and Dutch teams. In October, Dutch national coach Andries Jonker said that Yohannes was still not eligible to play for the Netherlands.

On November 11, 2024, Yohannes committed to representing the United States in international play.

== Personal life ==
Yohannes is of Eritrean descent. Her maternal grandfather, Bokretsion Gebrehiwot, was a member of the Ethiopia national football team. Her two older brothers also play Dutch club soccer. Her oldest brother Aethan played on the United States under-15 and under-17 national teams and played college soccer at Wake Forest University. He is currently on the under-21 team of FC Den Bosch in North Brabant. Her brother Jayden plays for the under-21 team of SC Telstar in North Holland.

== Career statistics ==
=== Club ===
As of match played September 30, 2026

Appearances and goals by club, season and competition
Club	Season	League			National cup (Note: Includes KNVB Women's Cup, Coupe de France Féminine)		League cup (Note: Includes Coupe LFFP)		Continental		Other		Total	
Club	Season	Division	Apps	Goals	Apps	Goals	Apps	Goals	Apps	Goals	Apps	Goals	Apps	Goals
Ajax	2023–24	Eredivisie	20	5	1	0	—		9 (Note: Appearances in UEFA Women's Champions League)	0	1 (Note: Appearance in Dutch Women's Super Cup)	0	31	5
Ajax	2024–25	Eredivisie	19	6	1	0	—		2	0	1	0	23	6
Ajax	Total		39	11	2	0	—		11	0	2	0	54	11
OL Lyonnes	2025–26	Première Ligue	20	4	3	0	3	0	10	2	—		36	6
OL Lyonnes	2026–27	Première Ligue	2	0	0	0	0	0	2	0	—		4	0
OL Lyonnes	Total		22	4	3	0	3	0	12	0	—		40	6
Career total			61	15	5	0	3	0	23	0	2	0	94	17

=== International ===
As of match played October 13, 2026

National team	Year	Apps	Goals
United States	2024	2	1
United States	2025	11	0
United States	2026	9	0
Total		22	1

Scores and results list United States' goal tally first, score column indicates score after each Yohannes goal.

List of international goals scored by Lily Yohannes
No.	Date	Venue	Opponent	Score	Result	Competition	Ref.
1	June 4, 2024	Allianz Field, Saint Paul, Minnesota	South Korea	3–0	3–0	Friendly	

== Honors ==
Ajax

- KNVB Women's Cup: 2023–24

Lyon

- Première Ligue: 2025–26
- Coupe de France Féminine: 2025–26
- Coupe LFFP: 2025–26

United States

- SheBelieves Cup: 2024, 2026

Individual

- Johan Cruyff Talent of the Year: 2023–24
- UNFP Première Ligue team of the season: 2025–26
