= Tarciane =

Brazilian footballer

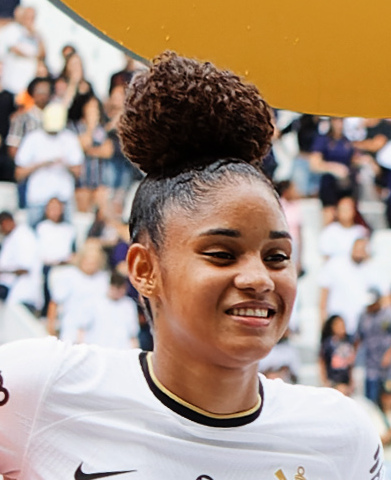
- Tarciane in 2023

Personal information
- Full name: Tarciane Karen dos Santos de Lima
- Date of birth: 27 May 2003 (age 23)
- Place of birth: Belford Roxo, Brazil
- Height: 1.84 m (6 ft 0 in)
- Position: Centre back

Team information
- Current team: Lyon
- Number: 33

Youth career
- 2019–2021: Fluminense

Senior career*
Years	Team	Apps	(Gls)
2019–2021	Fluminense	13	(1)
2021–2024	Corinthians	31	(4)
2024	Houston Dash	11	(0)
2025–	Lyon	25	(5)

International career^{‡}
2019	Brazil U17		
2022	Brazil U20	11	(8)
2022–	Brazil	7	(1)
Medal record
Women's football
Representing Brazil
Olympic Games
Silver medal – second place	2024 Paris
Copa América Femenina
Gold medal – first place	2025 Ecuador
- * Club domestic league appearances and goals as of 17:19, 4 October 2026 (UTC) ‡ National team caps and goals as of 00:35, 30 October 2024 (UTC)

Tarciane Karen dos Santos de Lima (born 27 May 2003), simply known as Tarciane, is a Brazilian professional footballer who plays as a central defender for Première Ligue club Lyon and the Brazil women's national team.

== Club career ==
=== Fluminense ===
Tarciane was born in Belford Roxo, Rio de Janeiro, and joined Fluminense's youth setup in 2019, from a local project called Daminhas da Bola. She immediately started to play with the main squad, while also featuring for the under-18 team.

On 21 June 2021, Tarciane asked to leave Flu.

=== Corinthians ===
Tarciane signed for Corinthians until the end of 2022. She made her league debut against Avaí on 22 August 2021. Tarciane scored her first league goal against Avaí on 28 May 2022, scoring in the 76th minute. On 16 December 2022, she renewed her contract until 2024.

=== Houston Dash ===
On 23 April 2024, the Houston Dash announced that they had signed Tarciane to a contract through the 2026 season with a mutual option for 2027. As of 2026, it is the biggest transfer fee in the history of Brazilian women's football.

=== Lyon ===
On 2 February 2025, Tarciane signed with Lyon on a four-year contract until June 2029.

== International career ==
Tarciane scored on her Brazil U20 debut against Uruguay U20s on 7 April 2022, scoring a penalty in the 63rd minute and scoring in the 66th minute.

After representing Brazil at under-17 and under-20 levels, Tarciane was called up for the senior side by manager Pia Sundhage on 22 September 2022, for friendlies against Norway and Italy. She made her full international debut on 7 October, coming on as a half-time substitute for Kathellen in a 4–1 win against the former in Oslo. Tarciane scored her first goal against Canada on 6 April 2024, scoring a penalty in the 22nd minute.

On 1 February 2024, Tarciane was called up to the Brazil squad for the 2024 CONCACAF W Gold Cup.

On 2 July 2024, Tarciane was called up to the Brazil squad for the 2024 Summer Olympics.

== Personal life ==
Tarciane married Thuany Siridakis on 25 July 2026.

== Honours ==
Corinthians

- Campeonato Brasileiro de Futebol Feminino Série A1: 2021, 2022, 2023
- Campeonato Paulista de Futebol Feminino: 2021
- Copa Libertadores Femenina: 2021, 2023
- Supercopa do Brasil de Futebol Feminino: 2022, 2023
- Copa Paulista de Futebol Feminino: 2022

Brazil U20

- South American Under-20 Women's Football Championship: 2022

Brazil

- Summer Olympics silver medal: 2024
- Copa América Femenina: 2025
