= Sofie Svava =

Danish footballer (born 2000)

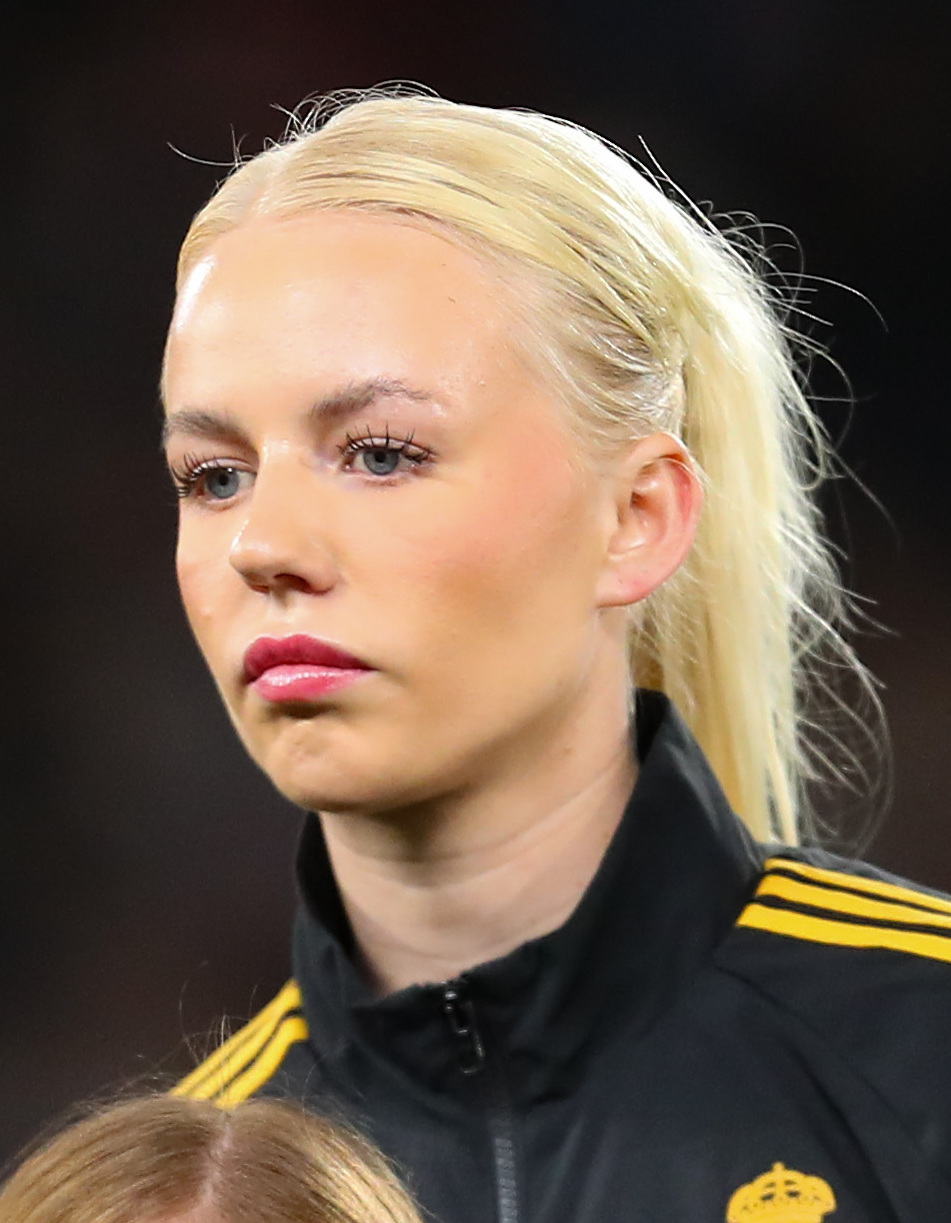
- Svava with Real Madrid in 2024

Personal information
- Date of birth: 11 August 2000 (age 26)
- Place of birth: Gentofte, Denmark
- Height: 1.73 m (5 ft 8 in)
- Positions: Defender; midfielder

Youth career
- Hørsholm-Usserød
- –2015: B.93

Senior career*
Years	Team	Apps	(Gls)
2015–2016	BSF		
2017–2019	Brøndby	42	(6)
2019–2020	FC Rosengård	35	(5)
2021	VfL Wolfsburg	14	(0)
2022–2024	Real Madrid	59	(0)
2024–2026	Lyon	36	(1)
2026–	Como 1907	4	(0)

International career^{‡}
2015	Denmark U16	6	(0)
2015–2016	Denmark U17	10	(2)
2016–2019	Denmark U19	24	(6)
2018	Denmark U23	1	(0)
2019–	Denmark	66	(5)
- * Club domestic league appearances and goals as of 16:05, 30 October 2026 (UTC) ‡ National team caps and goals as of 16:05, 30 October 2026 (UTC)

Sofie Svava (born 11 August 2000) is a Danish professional footballer who plays as a left wing-back or midfielder for Serie A club Como 1907 and the Denmark national team.

Svava has previously played for FC Rosengård of the Swedish Damallsvenskan, Brøndby IF of the Danish Elitedivisionen, VfL Wolfsburg of the German Bundesliga, Real Madrid of the Spanish Liga F, and French Première Ligue club Lyon. In January 2020, she was named by UEFA as one of the 10 most promising young players in Europe.

== Club career ==
Svava played in the junior teams of the clubs Hørsholm-Usserød, Brøndby, B.93, and Ballerup-Skovlunde Fodbold.

Starting at age 16, Svava played for Brøndby IF in the Danish top league and won the cup in her first season. In her second season she won the Danish championship. In July 2019, it was announced that Svava had signed a two-and-a-half-year contract with the Swedish side FC Rosengård. It was reported that Brøndby had received a club-record fee for 17-year-old Svava. In her debut season, she won Damallsvenskan. This made her champion twice in one year.

In November 2020, it was announced that Svava had signed a three-year contract with German club VfL Wolfsburg, running from January 2021. She made her debut on 5 February 2021 in the game against Turbine Potsdam when she came on as a substitute in injury time. In the 2021/22 Champions League, she was used in the group games against Servette FC Chênois and Juventus and reached the quarter-finals with the team.

In January 2022, Svava moved to Real Madrid.

In June 2024, Svava left Real Madrid and joined French club Lyon.

== International career ==
=== Youth ===
Svava made her first appearances for the Denmark U16 team in three games during a UEFA tournament in Ireland in February 2015. She then took part in the Nordic Cup at the end of June and beginning of July 2015. In September 2015 she was used in the U17 team in two friendly matches against Italy and scored her first international goal on 8 September. In October she took part in the first qualifying round for the 2016 U17 European Championship. They reached the elite round where she scored a goal against Israel.

In September 2016 she made her first appearance in the U19 team, winning 3–2 against Switzerland in a friendly match. In October she played in the first qualifying round for the 2017 U19 European Championship. She scored against Slovakia and qualified for the elite round as second in the group. She then played in three games at a tournament in La Manga in March 2017. She played again in September in the first qualifying round for the 2018 U19 European Championship. At the tournament, she contributed two goals and was named to the Best XI of the tournament. She was part of the team again at the finals of the 2018 U19 European Championship. They reached the semi-finals but lost 0–1 against defending champions Spain, who won first place three days later. The first qualifying round for the 2019 U19 European Championship started just one month later, and Svava scored against Liechtenstein. In October she took part with the team in the tournament.

=== Senior ===
Svava debuted for the Danish national team in the 1–0 friendly victory against Finland in January 2019, coming on as a substitute in the 74th minute. In 2019, Svava was named Danish Breakthrough Player of the Year. Additionally, she was nominated for Danish Football Player of the Year.

She has appeared for the team during the UEFA Euro 2021 qualifying cycle. She scored the first senior national goal in the victory against Georgia in qualifying for the Euro 2022. She played in the three games at the 2020 Algarve Cup and four other European Championship qualifying games, therefore able to contribute to early qualification for the finals.

She was always used in the nine games played in qualification for the 2023 World Cup and scored one goal. After Russia were excluded because of the political attack on Ukraine, which violated international law, Denmark were confirmed as World Cup participants early. They last took part in a World Cup in 2007. On 16 June 2022, she was nominated for the Euro 2022. There she was used in two games as Denmark were eliminated in the group stage. On 30 June she was nominated for the World Cup in Australia and New Zealand. She was not used at the World Cup, where Denmark made it to the round of 16 before being eliminated by Australia.

=== International goals ===
#	Date	Location	Opponent	Score	Result	Competition
1	12 November 2019	Viborg Stadium, Viborg, Denmark	Georgia	6–0	14–0	UEFA Women's Euro 2021 qualifying
2	26 October 2021	Podgorica City Stadium, Podgorica, Montenegro	Montenegro	3–0	5–1	2023 FIFA Women's World Cup qualification
3	18 February 2023	Stade Francis Le Basser, Laval, France	Norway	2–0	2–0	2023 Tournoi de France
4	9 April 2024	Viborg Stadium, Viborg, Denmark	Belgium	3–0	4–2	UEFA Women's Euro 2025 qualifying
5	24 October 2025	Tammelan Stadion, Tampere, Finland	Finland	2–0	6–1	2025 UEFA Women's Nations League promotion/relegation matches

== Achievements ==
- 2021: DFB Cup winner
- 2019: Danish champion and Swedish champion
- 2018: Danish Cup winner
