= Elma Junttila Nelhage =

Swedish footballer (born 2003)

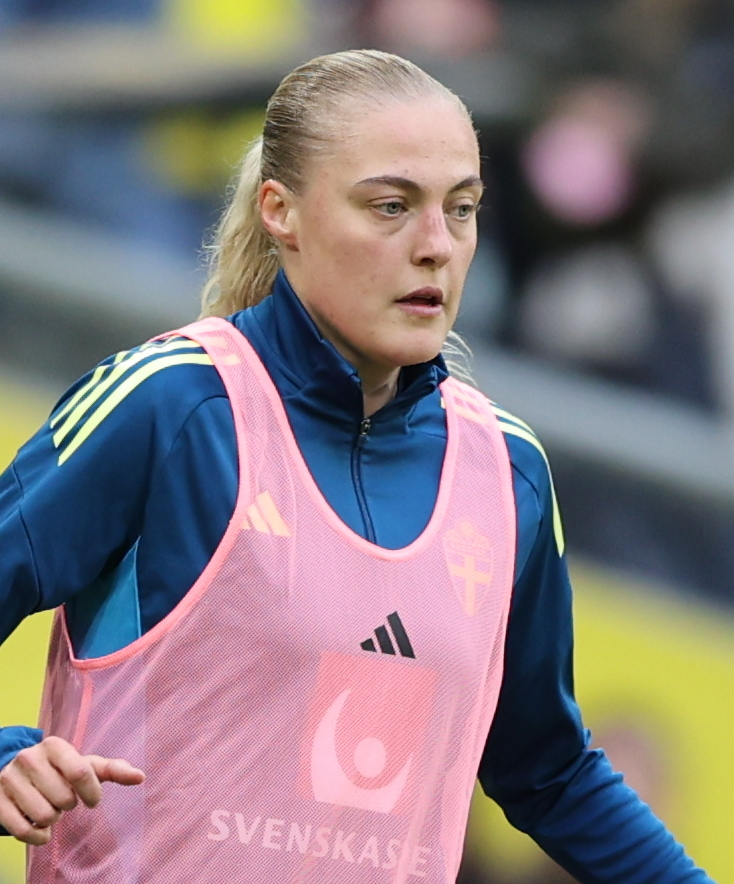
- Junttila Nelhage with Sweden in 2026

Personal information
- Full name: Elma Novah Junttila Nelhage
- Date of birth: 21 May 2003 (age 23)
- Place of birth: Hisingen, Sweden
- Height: 1.78 m (5 ft 10 in)
- Position: Defender

Team information
- Current team: Lyon
- Number: 5

Youth career
- –2019: IK Zenith
- 2019–2020: Kopparbergs/Göteborg

Senior career*
Years	Team	Apps	(Gls)
2021–2024	BK Häcken	51	(2)
2021	→ Kolbotn (loan)	14	(0)
2023	BK Häcken II	1	(0)
2025–	Lyon	14	(1)

International career^{‡}
2018–2020	Sweden U17	22	(1)
2021–2022	Sweden U19	10	(1)
2022–2025	Sweden U23	16	(0)
2025–	Sweden	7	(0)
- * Club domestic league appearances and goals as of 28 March 2026 ‡ National team caps and goals as of 18 April 2026

Elma Novah Junttila Nelhage (born 21 May 2003) is a Swedish professional footballer who plays as a defender for Première Ligue club Lyon and the Sweden national team. She has previously played in the Damallsvenskan for BK Häcken, and in the Toppserien for Kolbotn.

== Club career ==
=== BK Häcken ===
Junttila Nelhage was born in Hisingen, Sweden. She began her professional career with BK Häcken, which she signed her first professional contract with in March 2021. She spent most of the 2021 campaign out on loan, playing for Kolbotn, who placed sixth in the Norwegian top division Toppserien. Nelhage made 14 league appearances of which she started in 12.

She made her debut in the Damallsvenskan, the top tier of Swedish women's football, in 2022. Nelhage scored her first Damallsvenskan goal on 10 October 2024, against Vittsjö GIK. With BK Häcken, she made a total of 91 appearances across all competitions, scoring 3 goals. In the league alone, she played 51 matches, including 18 starts in 20 appearances during the 2023/2024 season.

=== Lyon ===
On 3 January 2025, she joined Lyon, after her contract with BK Häcken expired, signing a contract until 30 June 2027. At the time of her signing, she was the only left-footed central defender in the squad. She made her debut for Lyon on 14 March 2025, coming on as a substitute in a league match against Stade de Reims.

== International career ==
Junttila Nelhage has represented Sweden at various youth levels. She made her senior team debut on 28 October 2025 in a 1–0 loss to Spain.

== Career statistics ==
=== International ===
As of match played 18 April 2026

Appearances and goals by national team and year
National team	Year	Apps	Goals
Sweden	2025	3	0
Sweden	2026	4	0
Total		7	0

== Honours ==
Lyon

- Première Ligue: 2024–25, 2025–26
- Coupe de France Féminine: 2025–26
- Coupe LFFP: 2025–26
