= 2023–24 Olympique Lyonnais Féminin season =

Olympique Lyonnais Féminin
2023–24 season
- Manager: Sonia Bompastor
- Stadium: Groupama OL Training Center
- Division 1: Winners
- Coupe de France: Semi-final
- Trophée des Championnes: Winners
- UEFA Champions League: Runners Up
- Top goalscorer: League: Ada Hegerberg (12); All: Ada Hegerberg (21)
Home colours	Away colours	Third colours

The 2023–24 Olympique Lyonnais Féminin season was the club's twentieth season since FC Lyon joined OL as its women's section.

== Season events ==
On 22 June, Olympique Lyonnais made Lindsey Horan's loan deal from Portland Thorns a permanent move, with Horan signing until the summer of 2026.

On 1 July, Dzsenifer Marozsán extended her contract with Olympique Lyonnais until the summer of 2025, whilst Melchie Dumornay officially joined the club, having signed a pre-contract agreement on 16 January, from Stade Reims on a three-year deal.

On 5 July, Damaris Egurrola extended her contract with Olympique Lyonnais until the summer of 2027.

On 7 July, Olympique Lyonnais announced that six academy graduates had signed professional contracts with the club. Wassa Sangare, Liana Joseph, Maeline Mendy and Julie Swierot signed until the summer of 2026, whilst Féérine Belhadj and Alice Marques signed until the summer of 2025.

On 11 July, Olympique Lyonnais announced the signing of Laura Benkarth from Bayern Munich on a two-year contract.

On 2 August, Olympique Lyonnais announced the signing of Kadidiatou Diani from Paris Saint-Germain to a four-year contract.

On 15 September, Melvine Malard joined Manchester United on loan until the end of the 2023–24 season.

On 27 September, Inès Benyahia joined Le Havre on loan until the end of the 2023–24 season.

On 1 December, Christiane Endler extended her contract with Lyon until the summer of 2027.

On 12 December, Vanessa Gilles extended her loan deal with Lyon until the summer of 2025, with an option to make the move permanent.

On 22 March, Vicki Bècho extended her contract with Olympique Lyonnais until the summer of 2027.

On 17 April, Ada Hegerberg extended her contract with Olympique Lyonnais until the summer of 2027.

On 23 May, Eugénie Le Sommer extended her contract with Olympique Lyonnais until the summer of 2025.

== Squad ==
As of match played 25 May 2024

No.	Name	Nationality	Position	Date of birth (age)	Signed from	Signed in	Contract ends	Apps.	Goals
Goalkeepers
1	Christiane Endler	(Chile)	GK	23 July 1991 (aged 32)	Paris Saint-Germain	2021	2027	92	0
16	Feerine Belhadj	(France)	GK	14 February 2005 (aged 19)	Academy	2023	2025	1	0
30	Laura Benkarth	(Germany)	GK	14 October 1992 (aged 31)	Bayern Munich	2023	2025	7	0
Defenders
3	Wendie Renard (captain)	(France)	DF	20 July 1990 (aged 33)	Academy	2006	2026	478	152
4	Selma Bacha	(France)	DF	9 November 2000 (aged 23)	Academy	2017	2025	169	9
5	Perle Morroni	(France)	DF	15 October 1997 (aged 26)	Paris Saint-Germain	2021	2024	86	2
12	Ellie Carpenter	(Australia)	DF	8 April 2000 (aged 24)	Portland Thorns	2020	2026	97	1
15	Wassa Sangaré	(France)	DF	16 March 2006 (aged 18)	Academy	2023	2026	5	0
18	Alice Sombath	(France)	DF	16 October 2003 (aged 20)	Paris Saint-Germain	2020	2026	62	2
19	Kysha Sylla	(France)	DF	4 February 2004 (aged 20)	Academy	2021	2025	7	0
21	Vanessa Gilles	(Canada)	DF	11 March 1996 (aged 28)	on loan from Angel City	2022	2025	56	11
24	Alice Marques	(France)	DF	4 May 2005 (aged 19)	Academy	2023	2025	2	1
29	Griedge Mbock	(France)	DF	26 February 1995 (aged 29)	Guingamp	2015	2024	192	37
34	Jasmine Vilgrain	(Haiti)	DF	25 July 2002 (aged 21)	Academy	2023		1	0
35	Louna Belhout Achi	(Haiti)	DF	11 January 2005 (aged 19)	Academy	2023		1	0
Midfielders
6	Melchie Dumornay	(Haiti)	MF	17 August 2003 (aged 20)	Stade de Reims	2023	2026	20	9
7	Amel Majri	(France)	MF	25 January 1993 (aged 31)	Academy	2010	2026	299	91
8	Sara Däbritz	(Germany)	MF	15 February 1995 (aged 29)	Paris Saint-Germain	2022	2025	48	20
10	Dzsenifer Marozsán	(Germany)	MF	18 April 1992 (aged 32)	Eintracht Frankfurt	2016	2025	203	66
13	Damaris Egurrola	(Netherlands)	MF	26 August 1999 (aged 24)	Everton	2021	2027	94	6
17	Daniëlle van de Donk	(Netherlands)	MF	5 August 1991 (aged 32)	Arsenal	2021	2025	81	15
22	Sally Julini	(Switzerland)	MF	1 January 2003 (aged 21)	Academy	2020	2024	8	1
23	Julie Swierot	(France)	MF	14 March 2006 (aged 18)	Academy	2023	2026	3	0
26	Lindsey Horan	(United States)	MF	26 May 1994 (aged 29)	Portland Thorns	2023	2026	64	15
32	Maeline Mendy	(France)	MF	26 December 2006 (aged 17)	Academy	2023	2026	5	1
33	Chloe D'Abadie de Lurbe	(France)	MF	22 January 2004 (aged 20)	Academy	2023		1	0
37	Melissa Bethi	(Algeria)	MF	18 November 2005 (aged 18)	Academy	2023		2	0
38	Ambre Ouazar	(France)	MF	9 April 2007 (aged 17)	Academy	2023		1	0
38	Liana Priol	(France)	MF	1 April 2004 (aged 20)	Academy	2023		1	0
41	Laureen Oillic	(France)	MF	3 May 2005 (aged 19)	Academy	2023		3	0
45	Sofia Bekhaled	(France)	MF	26 October 2006 (aged 17)	Academy	2023		1	0
Forwards
9	Eugénie Le Sommer	(France)	FW	18 May 1989 (aged 35)	Stade Briochin	2010	2025	401	303
11	Kadidiatou Diani	(France)	FW	1 April 1995 (aged 29)	Paris Saint-Germain	2023	2027	33	18
14	Ada Hegerberg	(Norway)	FW	10 July 1995 (aged 28)	Turbine Potsdam	2014	2027	246	264
20	Delphine Cascarino	(France)	FW	5 February 1997 (aged 27)	Academy	2015	2024	221	45
27	Vicki Bècho	(France)	FW	3 October 2003 (aged 20)	Paris Saint-Germain	2020	2027	67	12
31	Liana Joseph	(France)	FW	15 August 2006 (aged 17)	Academy	2023	2026	3	1
39	Abigail Charpentier	(France)	FW	2 February 2005 (aged 19)	Academy	2023		3	0
43	Leila Wandeler	(Switzerland)	FW	11 April 2006 (aged 18)	Academy	2023		2	0
Out on loan
25	Inès Benyahia	(France)	FW	26 March 2003 (aged 21)	Academy	2020	2026	26	3
28	Melvine Malard	(France)	FW	28 June 2000 (aged 23)	Academy	2017		92	33
Left during the season
	Assimina Maoulida	(France)	DF	30 January 2002 (aged 22)	US Orléans	2020		0	0

=== Out on loan ===
Note: Flags indicate national team as defined under FIFA eligibility rules; some limited exceptions apply. Players may hold more than one non-FIFA nationality.

No.	Pos.	Nation	Player
—	FW	FRA	Inès Benyahia (at Le Havre until 30 June 2024)
—	FW	FRA	Melvine Malard (at Manchester United until 30 June 2024)

== Transfers ==
=== In ===
Date	Position	Nationality	Name	From	Fee	Ref.
22 June 2023	MF	(United States)	Lindsey Horan	Portland Thorns	Undisclosed	
1 July 2023	MF	(Haiti)	Melchie Dumornay	Stade Reims	Undisclosed	
11 July 2023	GK	(Germany)	Laura Benkarth	Bayern Munich	Undisclosed	
2 August 2023	FW	(France)	Kadidiatou Diani	Paris Saint-Germain	Undisclosed	

=== Out ===
Date	Position	Nationality	Name	To	Fee	Ref.
30 January 2024	DF	(France)	Assimina Maoulida	Fleury 91		

=== Loans out ===
Start date	Position	Nationality	Name	To	End date	Ref.
15 September 2023	FW	(France)	Melvine Malard	Manchester United	End of season	
27 September 2023	FW	(France)	Inès Benyahia	Le Havre	End of season	

=== Released ===
Date	Position	Nationality	Name	Joined	Date	Ref.
13 July 2023	GK	(France)	Alyssia Paljevic	Montauban		
30 June 2024	DF	(France)	Perle Morroni	San Diego Wave	22 August 2024	
30 June 2024	DF	(France)	Griedge Mbock	Paris Saint-Germain	3 July 2024	
30 June 2024	DF	(Haiti)	Jasmine Vilgrain			
30 June 2024	MF	(Algeria)	Mélissa Bethi	Nantes		
30 June 2024	MF	(France)	Liana Priol	Thonon Evian		
30 June 2024	MF	(Switzerland)	Sally Julini			
30 June 2024	FW	(France)	Delphine Cascarino	San Diego Wave	24 July 2024	
30 June 2024	FW	(France)	Abigail Charpentier			
30 June 2024	FW	(France)	Chloe D'Abadie de Lurbe			

== Friendlies ==
9 August 2023	Olympique Lyonnais	4–0	Grasshopper Club	Divonne-les-Bains
17:00 CEST (UTC+2)	Joseph 9'; Malard 44'; Benyahia 52'; Wandeler 66'	Report		Stadium: Cret d'Eau Sports Complex

19 August 2023	Olympique Lyonnais	3–3	Olympique Marseille	Décines-Charpieu
17:15 CEST (UTC+2)	Benyahia 20', 70' (pen.); Mendy 51'	Report	Diop 5', 34'; Clark (penalty missed) 21' 67'	Stadium: Groupama OL Training Center

26 August 2023	Olympique Lyonnais	1–2	AFC Ajax	Décines-Charpieu
11:30 CEST (UTC+2)	Benyahia 40'	Report	Leuchter 32', 58'	Stadium: Stade Gerard Houllier

== Competitions ==
=== Overview ===
Competition	First match	Last match	Starting round	Final position	Record							
Competition	First match	Last match	Starting round	Final position	Pld	W	D	L	GF	GA	GD	Win %
Division 1	16 September 2023	17 May 2024	Matchday 1	Winner	24	22	1	1	90	14	+76	91.67
Coupe de France	14 January 2024	9 March 2024	Round of 64	Semifinal	4	3	1	0	19	2	+17	75.00
Trophée des Championnes	10 September 2023		Final	Winner	1	1	0	0	2	0	+2	100.00
UEFA Champions League	14 November 2023	25 May 2024	Group Stage	Runners-up	11	8	2	1	36	12	+24	72.73
Total					40	34	4	2	147	28	+119	85.00

Last updated: 25 May 2024
Source: Competitions

=== Trophée des Championnes ===
10 September 2023	Olympique Lyonnais	2–0	Paris Saint-Germain	Troyes
21:00 CEST (UTC+2)	van de Donk (yellow card) 31'; Dumornay 36'; Le Sommer 67'	Report	Le Guilly (yellow card) 29'	Stadium: Stade de l'Aube; Referee: Victoria Beyer

=== Division 1 ===
==== First Phase ====
===== Table =====
Pos	Team	Pld	W	D	L	GF	GA	GD	Pts	Qualification or relegation
1	Lyon (C)	22	20	1	1	82	13	+69	61	Qualification for playoffs
2	Paris Saint-Germain	22	15	5	2	67	17	+50	50	Qualification for playoffs
3	Paris FC	22	13	3	6	56	27	+29	42	Qualification for playoffs
4	Reims	22	10	5	7	33	31	+2	35	Qualification for playoffs
5	Fleury	22	10	3	9	37	33	+4	33	

Source: Division 1 Féminine
Rules for classification: 1) points; 2) head-to-head points; 3) head-to-head goal difference; 4) goal difference; 5) goals scored
(C) Champions

===== Results summary =====
Overall								Home						Away					
Pld	W	D	L	GF	GA	GD	Pts	W	D	L	GF	GA	GD	W	D	L	GF	GA	GD
22	20	1	1	82	13	+69	61	10	1	0	39	4	+35	10	0	1	43	9	+34

Last updated: 8 May 2024.

===== Results by matchday =====
Matchday	1	2	3	4	5	6	7	8	9	10	11	12	13	14	15	16	17	18	19	20	21	22
Ground	A	A	H	H	A	A	H	H	A	H	A	H	A	H	H	A	H	A	H	A	H	A
Result	W	W	W	W	W	W	W	W	W	W	W	W	W	W	D	W	W	W	W	W	W	L
Position	1	2	2	1	1	1	1	1	1	1	1	1	1	1	1	1	1	1	1	1	1	1

Updated to match(es) played on 8 May 2024. Source: Results
A = Away; H = Home; W = Win; D = Draw; L = Loss; P = Postponed

===== Results =====
15 September 2023 1	Le Havre	0–4	Olympique Lyonnais	Le Havre
21:00 CEST (UTC+2)	Sumo (yellow card) 57'	Report	Le Sommer 25'; Renard 47' van de Donk 73'; Gilles 86'	Stadium: Stade Océane; Referee: Audrey Gerbel

1 October 2023 2	Paris Saint-Germain	0–1	Olympique Lyonnais	Paris
21:00 CEST (UTC+2)	Chawinga (yellow card) 84'	Report	Le Sommer 20' (yellow card) 48' van de Donk (yellow card) 64'; Egurrola (yellow card) 81'	Stadium: Stade Jean-Bouin; Referee: Emeline Rochebiliere

8 October 2023 3	Olympique Lyonnais	4–0	Girondins de Bordeaux	Décines-Charpieu
21:00 CEST (UTC+2)	Dumornay 24'; Diani 25'; Hegerberg 78'; Renard 86'	Report		Stadium: Stade Gerard Houllier; Referee: Alexandra Collin

14 October 2023 4	Olympique Lyonnais	6–0	AS Saint-Étienne	Décines-Charpieu
21:00 CEST (UTC+2)	Gilles 15'; Le Sommer 16', 26'; Horan 23', 79', 85'; Renard (yellow card) 37'; Bacha (yellow card) 75'; Mbock (yellow card) 89'	Report	Bataillard (yellow card) 29' (yellow-red card) 90'; Mbadi (yellow card) 77'	Stadium: Stade Gerard Houllier; Referee: Maika Vanderstichel

22 October 2023 5	Stade Reims	1–5	Olympique Lyonnais	Reims
21:00 CEST (UTC+2)	Imuran 28'	Report	Sombath 20'; Le Sommer 43'; Dumornay 45'; Horan 87'; Majri 90'	Stadium: Stade Auguste-Delaune; Referee: Clemence Goncalves

5 November 2023 6	Paris	1–6	Olympique Lyonnais	Bondoufle
21:00 CET (UTC+1)	Dufour 29'	Report	Le Sommer 1', 40'; Carpenter (yellow card) 25'; Hegerberg 38', 48'; Däbritz 68'; Diani 90'	Stadium: Stade Robert Bobin; Referee: Victoria Beyer

10 November 2023 7	Olympique Lyonnais	5–0	Montpellier	Décines-Charpieu
21:00 CET (UTC+1)	Däbritz 14'; Diani 17'; Boureille 61' (o.g.); Lakrar 76' (o.g.); Renard 90'	Report	Louis (yellow card) 84'; Blanc (yellow card) 90'	Stadium: Stade Gerard Houllier; Referee: Elisa Daupeux

17 November 2023 8	Olympique Lyonnais	4–1	Dijon	Décines-Charpieu
21:00 CET (UTC+1)	Sombath 34'; Dumornay 70'; Hegerberg 74'; Gilles (yellow card) 80'; Däbritz 89'	Report	Díaz 24'; Vairon (yellow card) 71'	Stadium: Stade Gerard Houllier; Referee: Charlene Laur

26 November 2023 9	Guingamp	1–5	Olympique Lyonnais	Guingamp
21:00 CET (UTC+1)	Cambot 45'; Traoré (yellow card) 49'	Report	Horan 4'; Jézéquel 15' (o.g.) van de Donk 29'; Hegerberg 71', 90'; Däbritz (yellow card) 78'	Stadium: Stade de Roudourou; Referee: Emeline Rochebiliere

8 December 2023 10	Olympique Lyonnais	5–0	Lille	Décines-Charpieu
21:00 CET (UTC+1)	Renard 17'; Hegerberg 27'; Egurrola (yellow card) 31' (goal) 57'; Mbock 59' van de Donk 90'	Report		Stadium: Stade Gerard Houllier; Referee: Celine Jeannot

16 December 2023 11	Fleury 91	1–3	Olympique Lyonnais	Fleury-Mérogis
13:30 CET (UTC+1)	Kamczyk 32'; Quintero (yellow card) 68'	Report	Egurrola 43'; Hegerberg 46'; Horan 80'	Stadium: Stade Auguste Gentelet; Referee: Emeline Rochebiliere

10 January 2024 12	Olympique Lyonnais	1–0	Paris	Décines-Charpieu
21:00 CET (UTC+1)	Bacha (yellow card) 28'; Hegerberg 84'	Report		Stadium: Stade Gerard Houllier; Referee: Alexandra Collin

21 January 2024 13	Montpellier	1–2	Olympique Lyonnais	Sussargues
21:00 CET (UTC+1)	Deslandes (yellow card) 35'; Bilbault (yellow card) 75'; Ngueleu (yellow card) 89'	Report	Gilles 12'; Hegerberg 26' van de Donk (yellow card) 90'	Stadium: Stade Jules Rimet; Referee: Maika Vanderstichel

3 February 2024 14	Olympique Lyonnais	4–1	Stade Reims	Décines-Charpieu
14:30 CET (UTC+1)	Le Sommer 12', 18'; Däbritz 33'; Hegerberg 49'	Report	Chossenotte 44'; Ndzana (yellow card) 80'	Stadium: Stade Gerard Houllier; Referee: Elisa Daupeux

11 February 2024 15	Olympique Lyonnais	1–1	Paris Saint-Germain	Décines-Charpieu
21:00 CET (UTC+1)	Gilles (yellow card) 69'; De Almeida 89' (o.g.)	Report	Baltimore (yellow card) 53'; Karchaoui (yellow card) 65'; Chawinga 66'; Geyoro (yellow card) 74'	Stadium: Parc Olympique Lyonnais; Referee: Clemence Goncalves

3 March 2024 16	Dijon	1–3	Olympique Lyonnais	Dijon
21:00 CET (UTC+1)	Roth 38'	Report	Däbritz 6', 90'; Sylla (yellow card) 35'; Hegerberg 44'	Stadium: Stade des Poussots; Referee: Audrey Gerbel

15 March 2024 17	Olympique Lyonnais	4–0	Fleury 91	Décines-Charpieu
21:00 CET (UTC+1)	Däbritz 11', 83'; Mbock 13'; Dumornay (yellow card) 50' (goal) 86'; Bacha (yellow card) 55' van de Donk (yellow card) 90+3'	Report	Diakité (yellow card) 27'; Fernandes (yellow card) 80'; Fontaine (yellow card) 90+3'; Ngaseh Mbele (yellow card) 90+4'	Stadium: Stade Gerard Houllier; Referee: Victoria Beyer

23 March 2024 18	Lille	0–7	Olympique Lyonnais	Villeneuve-d'Ascq
13:30 CET (UTC+1)	Johnson (yellow card) 44'	Report	Bècho 4', 59'; Marozsán 26'; Egurrola (yellow card) 29'; Majri (yellow card) 37' (goal) 43', 50', 67'; Joseph 63'; Sylla (yellow card) 85'	Stadium: Stadium Lille Métropole; Referee: Aurelie Efe

31 March 2024 19	Olympique Lyonnais	3–0	Le Havre	Décines-Charpieu
21:00 CEST (UTC+2)	Le Sommer 33'; Dumornay 42'; Däbritz 58'; Egurrola (yellow card) 73'	Report	Borgella (yellow card) 33'; Davis (yellow card) 53'; Sumo (yellow card) 90'	Stadium: Stade Gerard Houllier; Referee: Audrey Gerbel

14 April 2024 20	AS Saint-Étienne	1–6	Olympique Lyonnais	Saint-Étienne
21:00 CEST (UTC+2)	Pierre-Louis 21'; Otu (yellow card) 37'; Mbadi (yellow card) 73'	Report	Mbock 14'; Renard 18' (pen.); Bècho 28', 90+3'; Diani 45+4' (pen.); Otu 70' (o.g.)	Stadium: Stade Salif-Keita; Referee: Victoria Beyer

24 April 2024 21	Olympique Lyonnais	2–1	Guingamp	Décines-Charpieu
18:30 CEST (UTC+2)	Mendy 25' (yellow card) 34'; Bècho 43'; Sangare (yellow card) 68'; Wandeler (yellow card) 90+3'	Report	Péniguel 58'	Stadium: Stade Gerard Houllier; Referee: Aurelie Efe

8 May 2024 22	Girondins de Bordeaux	2–1	Olympique Lyonnais	Le Bouscat
16:30 CEST (UTC+2)	Bourgouin (yellow card) 28' (goal) 45', 85'	Report	Marques 34'	Stadium: Stade Sainte-Germaine; Referee: Celine Jeannot

==== Playoffs ====
12 May 2024 Semifinal	Olympique Lyonnais	6–0	Stade Reims	Décines-Charpieu
17:00 CEST (UTC+2)	Renard 12' van de Donk 36'; Majri 42'; Diani 57', 67'; Dumornay 58'; Morroni (yellow card) 88'	Report		Stadium: Parc Olympique Lyonnais; Attendance: 11,110; Referee: Clémence Gonçalves

17 May 2024 Final	Olympique Lyonnais	2–1	Paris Saint-Germain	Décines-Charpieu
21:00 CEST (UTC+2)	Cascarino 18'; Diani 22' van de Donk (yellow card) 86'	Report	Chawinga 73'; Gaetino (yellow card) 89'	Stadium: Parc Olympique Lyonnais; Referee: Maika Vanderstichel

=== Coupe de France ===
14 January 2024 Round of 32	Olympique Lyonnais	4–0	Montpellier	Décines-Charpieu
15:00 CET (UTC+1)	Majri 3'; Horan 38'; Hegerberg 55'; Gilles 64'	Report	Mondésir (yellow card) 77'	Stadium: Stade Gerard Houllier; Referee: Audrey Gerbel

28 January 2024 Round of 16	Olympique Lyonnais	6–0	Nantes	Décines-Charpieu
15:00 CET (UTC+1)	Bècho 8'; Carpenter (yellow card) 51'; Marozsán 56'; Hegerberg 58'; Le Sommer 67', 78'; Mbock 69'	Report	Ossol (yellow card) 72'	Stadium: Stade Gerard Houllier; Referee: Siham Benmahammed

14 February 2024 Quarterfinal	Montauban	2–9	Olympique Lyonnais	Montauban
18:00 CET (UTC+1)	Mbengue 7' (yellow card) 13'; Béché 87'	Report	Däbritz 10'; Bècho 22'; Diani 36', 64', 74'; Sombath (yellow card) 44'; Le Sommer 47', 49'; Hegerberg 55', 57'	Stadium: Stade de la Fobio; Referee: Audrey Gerbel

9 March 2024 Semifinal	Olympique Lyonnais	0–0 (a.e.t.) (4–5 p)	Fleury 91	Décines-Charpieu
17:45 CET (UTC+1)	Bacha (yellow card) 38'	Report	Dafeur (yellow card) 56'; Kouassi (yellow card) 69'; Diakité (yellow card) 83'	Stadium: Stade Gerard Houllier; Referee: Elisa Daupeux
	Penalties
	Mbock (penalty missed); Le Sommer (penalty missed) van de Donk (penalty scored); Däbritz (penalty scored); Dumornay (penalty scored); Egurrola (penalty scored); Cascarino (penalty missed)		(penalty scored) Dafeur; (penalty missed) Louis; (penalty scored) Jaurena; (penalty scored) Kamczyk; (penalty missed) Diakité; (penalty scored) Kassi; (penalty scored) Le Garrec

=== UEFA Champions League ===
==== Group stage ====
Pos	Team	Pld	W	D	L	GF	GA	GD	Pts	Qualification
1	(France) Lyon	6	4	2	0	25	5	+20	14	Advance to quarter-finals
2	(Norway) Brann	6	4	1	1	9	7	+2	13	Advance to quarter-finals
3	(Czech Republic) Slavia Prague	6	1	2	3	3	13	−10	5	
4	(Austria) St. Pölten	6	0	1	5	2	14	−12	1	

Source: UEFA
Rules for classification: Group stage tiebreakers

14 November 2023 1	Slavia Prague (Czech Republic)	0–9	(France) Olympique Lyonnais	Prague, Czech Republic
21:00 CET (UTC+1)	Bartovičová (yellow card) 58'	Report	Däbritz 3'; Van de Donk 14'; Gilles 17', 80'; Le Sommer 21'; Diani 24', 45' (yellow card) 41'; Hegerberg 60' (pen.); Majri 62'	Stadium: Fortuna Arena; Attendance: 2,728; Referee: Eleni Antoniou (Greece)

22 November 2023 2	Olympique Lyonnais (France)	2–0	(Austria) St. Pölten	Décines-Charpieu, France
18:45 CET (UTC+1)	Van de Donk 4'; Balog 47' (o.g.)	Report	Lemešová (yellow card) 24'	Stadium: Parc Olympique Lyonnais; Attendance: 6,076; Referee: Sandra Bastos (Portugal)

13 December 2023 3	Olympique Lyonnais (France)	3–1	(Norway) Brann	Décines-Charpieu, France
21:00 CET (UTC+1)	Diani 6', 48'; Hegerberg 23'; Bacha (yellow card) 44'; Marozsán (yellow card) 89'	Report	Lund (yellow card) 57'; Kielland 73'	Stadium: Parc Olympique Lyonnais; Attendance: 6,581; Referee: Marta Huerta de Aza (Spain)

21 December 2023 4	Brann (Norway)	2–2	(France) Olympique Lyonnais	Bergen, Norway
18:45 CET (UTC+1)	Stenevik (yellow card) 25'; Kielland 34'; Gaupset 90+4'	Report	Majri 6'; Hegerberg 13' (pen.); Morroni (yellow card) 31'; Horan (red card) 52'	Stadium: Åsane Arena; Attendance: 3,700; Referee: Volha Blotskaya (Belarus)

25 January 2024 5	St. Pölten (Austria)	0–7	(France) Olympique Lyonnais	Sankt Pölten, Austria
21:00 CET (UTC+1)	Touon (yellow card) 36'	Report	Hegerberg 21', 36'; Däbritz 22', 87'; Gilles 55'; Marozsán 79'; Diani 83'	Stadium: NÖ Arena; Attendance: 1,098; Referee: Silvia Gasperotti (Italy)

31 January 2024 6	Olympique Lyonnais (France)	2–2	(Czech Republic) Slavia Prague	Décines-Charpieu, France
18:45 CET (UTC+1)	Majri 4'; Bècho 74'	Report	Černá 9' (yellow card) 75'; Lukášová (yellow card) 75'; Gilles 90+1' (o.g.)	Stadium: Parc Olympique Lyonnais; Attendance: 10,734; Referee: Kirsty Dowle (England)

==== Knockout stage ====
19 March 2024 Quarter-final 1st leg	SL Benfica (Portugal)	1–2	(France) Olympique Lyonnais	Lisbon, Portugal
21:00 CET (UTC+1)	Faria 43'; Ucheibe (yellow card) 66'; Alves (yellow card) 90+3'	Report	Bacha (yellow card) 32'; Cascarino 63' (yellow card) 90+3'; Däbritz 79'	Stadium: Estádio da Luz; Attendance: 19,736; Referee: Ewa Augustyn (Poland)

27 March 2024 Quarter-final 2nd leg	Olympique Lyonnais (France)	4–1 (6–2 agg.)	(Portugal) SL Benfica	Décines-Charpieu, France
18:45 CET (UTC+1)	Däbritz (yellow card) 29'; Cascarino 43', 51'; Dumornay (yellow card) 81'; Diani 90+1', 90+6'	Report	Alidou 45'; Ucheibe (yellow card) 59'; Amado (yellow card) 62'; Laís (yellow card) 90'	Stadium: Parc Olympique Lyonnais; Attendance: 21,239; Referee: Cheryl Foster (Wales)

20 April 2024 Semi-final 1st leg	Olympique Lyonnais (France)	3–2	(France) Paris Saint-Germain	Décines-Charpieu, France
19:00 CET (UTC+1)	Diani (yellow card) 76' (goal) 80'; Dumornay 85'; Majri 86'	Report	Katoto 44', 48'	Stadium: Parc Olympique Lyonnais; Attendance: 38,466; Referee: Marta Huerta de Aza (Spain)

28 April 2024 Semi-final 2nd leg	Paris Saint-Germain (France)	1–2 (3–5 agg.)	(France) Olympique Lyonnais	Paris, France
16:00 CEST (UTC+2)	Chawinga 41'; Karchaoui (yellow card) 57'	Report	Bacha 3' van de Donk (yellow card) 12'; Carpenter (yellow card) 56'; Dumornay 81'	Stadium: Parc des Princes; Attendance: 29,400; Referee: Ivana Projkovska (North Macedonia)

25 May 2024 Final	Barcelona (Spain)	2–0	(France) Olympique Lyonnais	Bilbao, Spain
18:00 CEST (UTC+2)	Bonmatí 63'; Putellas 90+5' (yellow card) 90+6'	Report	Renard (yellow card) 70'; Endler (yellow card) 90+7'	Stadium: San Mamés; Attendance: 50,827; Referee: Rebecca Welch (England)

== Squad statistics ==
As of match played 25 May 2024

=== Appearances ===
No.	Pos	Nat	Player	Total		Division 1		Coupe de France		Trophée des Championnes		UEFA Champions League	
No.	Pos	Nat	Player	Apps	Goals	Apps	Goals	Apps	Goals	Apps	Goals	Apps	Goals
1	GK	(Chile) CHI	Christiane Endler	32	0	18	0	3	0	1	0	10	0
3	DF	(France) FRA	Wendie Renard	21	6	13+1	6	0	0	1	0	6	0
4	DF	(France) FRA	Selma Bacha	33	1	15+3	0	3+1	0	1	0	9+1	1
5	DF	(France) FRA	Perle Morroni	27	0	10+8	0	0+1	0	0+1	0	3+4	0
6	MF	(Haiti) HAI	Melchie Dumornay	20	9	9+4	6	0+1	0	1	1	3+2	2
7	MF	(France) FRA	Amel Majri	35	10	13+7	5	3+1	1	0+1	0	4+6	4
8	MF	(Germany) GER	Sara Däbritz	28	14	9+7	9	2+2	1	0	0	6+2	4
9	FW	(France) FRA	Eugénie Le Sommer	26	16	14+1	10	3+1	4	1	1	3+3	1
10	MF	(Germany) GER	Dzsenifer Marozsán	26	3	8+9	1	2	1	0+1	0	1+5	1
11	FW	(France) FRA	Kadidiatou Diani	33	18	16+2	7	2+1	3	1	0	10+1	8
12	DF	(Australia) AUS	Ellie Carpenter	33	0	16+1	0	4	0	1	0	11	0
13	MF	(Netherlands) NED	Damaris Egurrola	35	2	19+2	2	3	0	1	0	8+2	0
14	FW	(Norway) NOR	Ada Hegerberg	26	21	8+7	12	3+1	4	0	0	6+1	5
15	DF	(France) FRA	Wassa Sangaré	5	0	1+3	0	0+1	0	0	0	0	0
16	GK	(France) FRA	Féerine Belhadj	1	0	1	0	0	0	0	0	0	0
17	MF	(Netherlands) NED	Daniëlle van de Donk	35	6	14+6	4	2+2	0	1	0	8+2	2
18	DF	(France) FRA	Alice Sombath	23	2	9+6	2	3+1	0	0	0	1+3	0
19	DF	(France) FRA	Kysha Sylla	5	0	3+2	0	0	0	0	0	0	0
20	FW	(France) FRA	Delphine Cascarino	15	4	3+4	1	1+2	0	0	0	5	3
21	DF	(Canada) CAN	Vanessa Gilles	32	7	15+3	3	2	1	1	0	10+1	3
23	MF	(France) FRA	Julie Swierot	3	0	1+1	0	0	0	0	0	0+1	0
24	DF	(France) FRA	Alice Marques	2	1	1+1	1	0	0	0	0	0	0
26	MF	(United States) USA	Lindsey Horan	27	7	13+2	6	2	1	1	0	9	0
27	FW	(France) FRA	Vicki Bècho	32	8	7+12	5	2+1	2	0+1	0	2+7	1
29	DF	(France) FRA	Griedge Mbock	29	4	14+2	3	3+1	1	0+1	0	5+3	0
30	GK	(Germany) GER	Laura Benkarth	7	0	5	0	1	0	0	0	1	0
31	FW	(France) FRA	Liana Joseph	3	1	0+3	1	0	0	0	0	0	0
32	MF	(France) FRA	Maeline Mendy	5	1	2+3	1	0	0	0	0	0	0
33	FW	(France) FRA	Chloe D'Abadie de Lurbe	1	0	1	0	0	0	0	0	0	0
34	DF	(Haiti) HAI	Jasmine Vilgrain	1	0	0+1	0	0	0	0	0	0	0
35	DF	(France) FRA	Louna Belhout Achi	1	0	0+1	0	0	0	0	0	0	0
37	MF	(Algeria) ALG	Melissa Bethi	2	0	2	0	0	0	0	0	0	0
38	MF	(France) FRA	Liana Priol	1	0	0+1	0	0	0	0	0	0	0
38	MF	(France) FRA	Ambre Ouazar	1	0	0+1	0	0	0	0	0	0	0
39	FW	(France) FRA	Abigail Charpentier	3	0	1+2	0	0	0	0	0	0	0
41	MF	(France) FRA	Laureen Oillic	3	0	1+2	0	0	0	0	0	0	0
43	FW	(Switzerland) SUI	Leila Wandeler	2	0	1+1	0	0	0	0	0	0	0
45	MF	(France) FRA	Sofia Bekhaled	1	0	1	0	0	0	0	0	0	0
Players away from the club on loan:
Players who appeared for Olympique Lyonnais but left during the season:

=== Goal scorers ===
Place	Position	Nation	Number	Name	Division 1	Coupe de France	Trophée des Championnes	UEFA Champions League	Total
1	FW	(Norway)	14	Ada Hegerberg	12	4	0	5	21
2	FW	(France)	11	Kadidiatou Diani	7	3	0	8	18
3	FW	(France)	9	Eugénie Le Sommer	10	4	1	1	16
4	MF	(Germany)	8	Sara Däbritz	9	1	0	4	14
5	MF	(France)	7	Amel Majri	5	1	0	4	10
6	MF	(Haiti)	6	Melchie Dumornay	6	0	1	2	9
7	FW	(France)	27	Vicki Bècho	5	2	0	1	8
8	MF	(United States)	26	Lindsey Horan	6	1	0	0	7
8	DF	(Canada)	21	Vanessa Gilles	3	1	0	3	7
10	DF	(France)	3	Wendie Renard	6	0	0	0	6
10	MF	(Netherlands)	17	Daniëlle van de Donk	4	0	0	2	6
10				Own goal	5	0	0	1	6
13	DF	(France)	29	Griedge Mbock	3	1	0	0	4
13	FW	(France)	20	Delphine Cascarino	1	0	0	3	4
15	MF	(Germany)	10	Dzsenifer Marozsán	1	1	0	1	3
16	DF	(France)	18	Alice Sombath	2	0	0	0	2
16	MF	(Netherlands)	13	Damaris Egurrola	2	0	0	0	2
18	MF	(France)	31	Liana Joseph	1	0	0	0	1
18	MF	(France)	32	Maeline Mendy	1	0	0	0	1
18	DF	(France)	24	Alice Marques	1	0	0	0	1
18	DF	(France)	4	Selma Bacha	0	0	0	1	1
Total					90	19	2	36	147

=== Clean sheets ===
Place	Position	Nation	Number	Name	Division 1	Coupe de France	Trophée des Championnes	UEFA Champions League	Total
1	GK	(Chile)	1	Christiane Endler	10	3	1	3	17
2	GK	(Germany)	30	Laura Benkarth	2	0	0	0	2
Total					12	3	1	3	19

=== Disciplinary record ===
Number	Nation	Position	Name	Division 1		Coupe de France		Trophée des Championnes		UEFA Champions League		Total	
Number	Nation	Position	Name	Yellow card	Red card	Yellow card	Red card	Yellow card	Red card	Yellow card	Red card	Yellow card	Red card
1	(Chile)	GK	Christiane Endler	0	0	0	0	0	0	1	0	1	0
3	(France)	DF	Wendie Renard	1	0	0	0	0	0	1	0	2	0
4	(France)	DF	Selma Bacha	3	0	1	0	0	0	2	0	6	0
5	(France)	DF	Perle Morroni	1	0	0	0	0	0	1	0	2	0
6	(Haiti)	MF	Melchie Dumornay	1	0	0	0	0	0	1	0	2	0
7	(France)	MF	Amel Majri	1	0	0	0	0	0	0	0	1	0
8	(Germany)	MF	Sara Däbritz	1	0	0	0	0	0	1	0	2	0
9	(France)	FW	Eugénie Le Sommer	1	0	0	0	0	0	0	0	1	0
10	(Germany)	MF	Dzsenifer Marozsán	0	0	0	0	0	0	1	0	1	0
11	(France)	FW	Kadidiatou Diani	0	0	0	0	0	0	2	0	2	0
12	(Australia)	DF	Ellie Carpenter	1	0	1	0	0	0	1	0	3	0
13	(Netherlands)	MF	Damaris Egurrola	4	0	0	0	0	0	0	0	4	0
15	(France)	DF	Wassa Sangaré	1	0	0	0	0	0	0	0	1	0
17	(Netherlands)	MF	Daniëlle van de Donk	4	0	0	0	1	0	1	0	6	0
18	(France)	DF	Alice Sombath	0	0	1	0	0	0	0	0	1	0
19	(France)	DF	Kysha Sylla	2	0	0	0	0	0	0	0	2	0
20	(France)	FW	Delphine Cascarino	0	0	0	0	0	0	1	0	1	0
21	(Canada)	DF	Vanessa Gilles	2	0	0	0	0	0	0	0	2	0
26	(United States)	MF	Lindsey Horan	0	0	0	0	0	0	0	1	0	1
29	(France)	DF	Griedge Mbock	1	0	0	0	0	0	0	0	1	0
32	(France)	MF	Maeline Mendy	1	0	0	0	0	0	0	0	1	0
43	(Switzerland)	FW	Leila Wandeler	1	0	0	0	0	0	0	0	1	0
Players away on loan:
Players who left Olympique Lyonnais during the season:
Total				26	0	3	0	1	0	13	1	43	1
