= 2023 UEFA Women's Under-17 Championship =

2023. aasta U-17 naiste Euroopa meistrivõistlused jalgpallis

Tournament details
- Host country: Estonia
- Dates: 14–26 May
- Teams: 8 (from 1 confederation)
- Venues: 4 (in 3 host cities)

Final positions
- Champions: France (1st title)
- Runners-up: Spain

Tournament statistics
- Matches played: 15
- Goals scored: 65 (4.33 per match)
- Attendance: 10,836 (722 per match)
- Top scorer(s): (France) Liana Joseph (France) Maeline Mendy (Spain) Vicky López (5 goals each)
- Best player: (Spain) Vicky López

The 2023 UEFA Women's Under-17 Championship was the 14th edition of the UEFA Women's Under-17 Championship, the annual international youth football championship organised by UEFA for the women's under-17 national teams of Europe. Estonia was hosting the tournament from May 14 to 26. It was the first women's final tournament to be held in Estonia. A total of eight teams were playing in the tournament, with players born on or after 1 January 2006 eligible to participate.

Germany were the two-time defending champions but were eliminated in the group stage. In the final, France won their first title by defeating Spain 3–2.

== Qualification ==
48 (out of 55) UEFA nations entered the qualifying competition, with the hosts Estonia also competing despite already qualifying automatically, and seven teams qualified for the final tournament at the end of round 2 to join the hosts. The draw for round 1 was held on 31 May 2022, at the UEFA headquarters in Nyon, Switzerland.

=== Qualified teams ===
The following teams qualified for the final tournament.

Team	Method of qualification	Appearance	Last appearance	Previous best performance
Estonia	Hosts	1st	Debut	
Poland	Round 2 Group A1 winners	3rd	2018 (Group stage)	Champions (2013)
England	Round 2 Group A2 winners	8th	2019 (Group stage)	Third place (2016)
Germany	Round 2 Group A3 winners	13th	2022 (Champions)	Champions (2008, 2009, 2012, 2014, 2016, 2017, 2019, 2022)
Switzerland	Round 2 Group A4 winners	3rd	2015 (Runners-up)	Runners-up (2015)
France	Round 2 Group A5 winners	9th	2022 (Third place)	Runners-up (2008, 2011, 2012)
Spain	Round 2 Group A6 winners	12th	2022 (Runners-up)	Champions (2010, 2011, 2015, 2018)
Sweden	Round 2 Group A7 winners	2nd	2013 (Runners-up)	Runners-up (2013)

=== Final draw ===
The final draw was held on 13 April 2023, 09:00 CET, at Lilleküla Stadium in Tallinn, Estonia.

== Venues ==
Tallinn		2023 UEFA Women's Under-17 Championship is located in Estonia	Tartu	Võru
Kadriorg Stadium	Lilleküla Stadium	2023 UEFA Women's Under-17 Championship is located in Estonia	Tamme Stadium	Võru Stadium
Capacity: 5,000	Capacity: 14,336	2023 UEFA Women's Under-17 Championship is located in Estonia	Capacity: 1,638	Capacity: 1,600

== Squads ==
Each national team had to submit a squad of 20 players, two of whom had to be goalkeepers (Regulations Article 44.01).

== Group stage ==
The group winners and runners-up advanced to the semi-finals.

Tiebreakers

In the group stage, teams were ranked according to points (3 points for a win, 1 point for a draw, 0 points for a loss), and if tied on points, the following tiebreaking criteria were applied, in the order given, to determine the rankings (Regulations Articles 20.01 and 20.02):

1. Points in head-to-head matches among tied teams;
2. Goal difference in head-to-head matches among tied teams;
3. Goals scored in head-to-head matches among tied teams;
4. If more than two teams were tied, and after applying all head-to-head criteria above, a subset of teams were still tied, all head-to-head criteria above were reapplied exclusively to that subset of teams;
5. Goal difference in all group matches;
6. Goals scored in all group matches;
7. Penalty shoot-out if only two teams had the same number of points, and they met in the last round of the group and were tied after applying all criteria above (not used if more than two teams had the same number of points, or if their rankings were not relevant for qualification for the next stage);
8. Disciplinary points (red card = 3 points, yellow card = 1 point, expulsion for two yellow cards in one match = 3 points);
9. Higher position in the qualification round 2 league ranking

All times are local, EEST (UTC+3).

=== Group A ===
Pos	Team	Pld	W	D	L	GF	GA	GD	Pts	Qualification
1	Spain	3	3	0	0	11	0	+11	9	Knockout stage
2	Switzerland	3	2	0	1	6	4	+2	6	Knockout stage
3	Germany	3	1	0	2	6	4	+2	3	
4	Estonia	3	0	0	3	0	15	−15	0	

Source: UEFA
Rules for classification: Group stage tiebreakers
14 May 2023
13:00

Germany	0–2	Spain
	Report	López 1', 58'

Kadriorg Stadium, Tallinn
Attendance: 207
Referee: Minka Vekkeli (Finland)
14 May 2023
19:00

Estonia	0–4	Switzerland
	Report	L. Egli 39'; Pfister 60'; Klingenstein 77'; Widmer 89'

Lilleküla Stadium, Tallinn
Attendance: 1,325
Referee: Emanuela Rusta (Albania)

17 May 2023
17:00

Estonia	0–5	Germany
	Report	Merino Gonzalez 6'; Portella 39'; Walheim 45'; Boboy 83'; Scholz 88' (pen.)

Kadriorg Stadium, Tallinn
Attendance: 630
Referee: Anahí Fernández (Uruguay)
17 May 2023
19:00

Spain	3–0	Switzerland
Redondo 7', 10', 45'	Report

Lilleküla Stadium, Tallinn
Attendance: 321
Referee: Deborah Bianchi (Italy)

20 May 2023
17:00

Spain	6–0	Estonia
García 9', 41', 89'; Cubo 48'; Vázquez 63'; Cerrato 79' (pen.)	Report

Lilleküla Stadium, Tallinn
Attendance: 1,032
Referee: Ana Maria Terteleac (Romania)
20 May 2023
17:00

Switzerland	2–1	Germany
Beney 37'; Ivelj 71' (pen.)	Report	Merino Gonzalez 60'

Kadriorg Stadium, Tallinn
Attendance: 184
Referee: Kristina Georgieva (Bulgaria)

=== Group B ===
Pos	Team	Pld	W	D	L	GF	GA	GD	Pts	Qualification
1	France	3	2	1	0	7	1	+6	7	Knockout stage
2	England	3	2	1	0	6	3	+3	7	Knockout stage
3	Poland	3	1	0	2	7	5	+2	3	
4	Sweden	3	0	0	3	1	12	−11	0	

Source: UEFA
Rules for classification: Group stage tiebreakers
14 May 2023
13:00

England	2–1	Poland
Agyemang 4', 22'	Report	Kuprowska 90+2'

Võru Stadium, Võru
Attendance: 251
Referee: Kristina Georgieva (Bulgaria)
14 May 2023
17:00

Sweden	0–3	France
	Report	Joseph 53'; Autin 73'; Effa Effa 75'

Tamme Stadium, Tartu
Attendance: 427
Referee: Anahí Fernández (Uruguay)

17 May 2023
13:00

Poland	0–3	France
	Report	Joseph 37'; N. Traoré 70'; Ma. Mendy 84'

Võru Stadium, Võru
Attendance: 531
Referee: Ana Maria Terteleac (Romania)
17 May 2023
19:00

Sweden	1–3	England
Reid 26' (o.g.)	Report	Agyemang 12', 49'; Baker 72'

Tamme Stadium, Tartu
Attendance: 740
Referee: Emanuela Rusta (Albania)

20 May 2023
13:00

Poland	6–0	Sweden
Grzywińska 19', 55', 74'; Jagodzińska 44'; Witek 49'; Witkowska 68'	Report

Tamme Stadium, Tartu
Attendance: 458
Referee: Deborah Bianchi (Italy)
20 May 2023
13:00

France	1–1	England
Effa Effa 76'	Report	Ward 44'

Võru Stadium, Võru
Attendance: 571
Referee: Minka Vekkeli (Finland)

== Knockout stage ==
In the knockout stage, a penalty shoot-out was used to decide the winner if necessary (no extra time was played).

=== Bracket ===
Semi-finals
Spain	3
England	1
France	10
Switzerland	2

Final
Spain	2
France	3

=== Semi-finals ===
23 May 2023
17:00

France	10–2	Switzerland
Ma. Mendy 13', 16', 76'; N. Traoré 38'; Joseph 40'; Rambaud 56', 86'; Effa Effa 60', 78'; Graziani 83'	Report	Beney 44'; Klingenstein 63'

Kadriorg Stadium, Tallinn
Attendance: 196
Referee: Anahí Fernández (Uruguay)
23 May 2023
19:00

Spain	3–1	England
López 5'; Gómez 88'; Comendador 90+1'	Report	Reid 55'

Lilleküla Stadium, Tallinn
Attendance: 784
Referee: Deborah Bianchi (Italy)

=== Final ===
26 May 2023
19:00

Spain	2–3	France
López 79', 80'	Report	Joseph 64', 74'; Ma. Mendy 78' (pen.)

Lilleküla Stadium, Tallinn
Attendance: 3,179
Referee: Minka Vekkeli (Finland)

== Goalscorers ==
There were 65 goals scored in 15 matches, for an average of 4.33 goals per match.

5 goals

- (France) Liana Joseph
- (France) Maeline Mendy
- (Spain) Vicky López

4 goals

- (England) Michelle Agyemang
- (France) Chancelle Effa Effa

3 goals

- (Poland) Zuzanna Grzywińska
- (Spain) Cristina Redondo
- (Spain) Marisa García

2 goals

- (France) Elisa Rambaud
- (France) Naolia Traoré
- (Germany) Estrella Merino Gonzalez
- (Switzerland) Iman Beney
- (Switzerland) Anja Klingenstein

1 goal

- (England) Ava Baker
- (England) Katie Reid
- (England) Mari Ward
- (France) Lou Autin
- (France) Ornella Graziani
- (Germany) Delice Boboy
- (Germany) Laila Portella
- (Germany) Marina Scholz
- (Germany) Melina Walheim
- (Poland) Roksana Jagodzińska
- (Poland) Wiktoria Kuprowska
- (Poland) Zuzanna Witek
- (Poland) Iga Witkowska
- (Spain) Alba Cerrato
- (Spain) Lorena Cubo
- (Spain) Ainoa Gómez
- (Spain) Paula Comendador
- (Spain) Elena Vázquez
- (Switzerland) Leela Egli
- (Switzerland) Noemi Ivelj
- (Switzerland) Emanuela Pfister
- (Switzerland) Nathalie Widmer

1 own goal

- (England) Katie Reid (against Sweden)

Source: UEFA

== Awards ==
The following awards were given after the tournament:

- Player of the Tournament: (Spain) Vicky López
- Top Scorer(s): (France) Liana Joseph, (France) Maeline Mendy, (Spain) Vicky López (5 goals each).

=== Team of the Tournament ===
After the tournament, the Under-17 Team of the Tournament was selected by the UEFA Technical Observer panel.

Position	Player
Goalkeeper	(Spain) Alazne Estensoro
Defenders	(Spain) Noemí Bejarano
Defenders	(Spain) Aïcha Camara
Defenders	(England) Katie Reid
Defenders	(Spain) Martina González
Midfielders	(France) Maeline Mendy
Midfielders	(France) Nermyne Ben Khaled
Midfielders	(Spain) Vicky López
Forwards	(Switzerland) Iman Beney
Forwards	(France) Liana Joseph
Forwards	(France) Chancelle Effa Effa
