= Maeline Mendy =

French footballer (born 2006)

Personal information
- Full name: Maeline Jacqueline Caroline Mendy
- Date of birth: 26 December 2006 (age 19)
- Place of birth: Nogent-sur-Marne, France
- Position: Midfielder

Team information
- Current team: Paris FC
- Number: 27

Youth career
- 2012–2017: AS Val-de-Fontenay
- 2017–2022: RC Joinville
- 2022–: Lyon

Senior career*
Years	Team	Apps	(Gls)
2023–	Lyon B	4	(5)
2024–	OL Lyonnes	7	(2)
2025	→ Strasbourg (loan)	10	(2)
2025–2026	→ Paris FC (loan)	11	(2)
2026–	Paris FC	0	(0)

International career^{‡}
2022–2023	France U17	14	(10)
2023–	France U19	14	(9)
2024–	France U20	4	(0)
Medal record
Women's football
Representing France
UEFA Women's Under-19 Championship
Runner-up	2025 Poland
UEFA Women's Under-17 Championship
Winner	2023 Estonia
- * Club domestic league appearances and goals as of 05:23, 13 June 2026 (UTC) ‡ National team caps and goals as of 5 April 2025

Maeline Jacqueline Caroline Mendy (born 26 December 2006) is a French footballer who plays as a midfielder for Première Ligue club Paris FC. She has previously played for OL Lyonnes and Strasbourg.

== Early life ==
Born in Nogent-sur-Marne, Mendy started playing football at AS Val-de-Fontenay, where she played with the club's boys team. In 2017, she joined RC Joinville where she captained the U14 boys team before joining Lyon youth team in 2022. She won the 2022-23 France national U-19 Women's Championship with Lyon.

== Club career ==
=== Lyon ===
On 7 July 2023, Olympique Lyonnais announced that they had signed a professional contract with Mendy until the summer of 2026. She made her professional debut on 3 March 2024, in a match against Dijon (1-3). With 7 games played, and 2 goals scored in the league, Mendy became the first Lyon player to score more than one goal before her 18th birthday. On 11 January 2025, Lyon announced that they had extended their contract with Mendy until the summer of 2027.

Mendy was loaned to RC Strasbourg on 15 January 2025, on a deal that running until 30 June 2025. The aim of the loan is to give her more playing time and enable her to continue her progress at the highest level. Maeline Mendy scored her first goal for RC Strasbourg on 29 March, on the 19th day of the Arkema Première Ligue in a 6-0 win over En Avant Guingamp. Mendy scored the fourth goal of the match in the 63rd minute.

=== Paris FC ===
On 25 September 2025, Mendy extended her contract with Lyon through the summer of 2028 and was subsequently sent on a season-long loan to Paris FC. In April 2026, she was named the Première Ligue Player of the Month. After Mendy's loan at Paris FC expired, she joined the club permanently on 28 July 2026, signing a five-year deal until 2031.

== International career ==
In 2023, Mendy captained France under-17s during the 2023 UEFA Women's Under-17 Championship. She scored a hattrick and delivered 2 assists against Switzerland in the semi-finals and scored one goal in the final to help France winning the competition for the first time in their history. Mendy scored in total 5 goals during the campaign and was the joint top scorer alongside her teammate Liana Joseph and Spanish team player Vicky López.

== Honours ==
Lyon

- Division 1 Féminine: 2023–24

France U17

- UEFA Women's Under-17 Championship: 2023

France U19

- UEFA Women's Under-19 Championship runner-up: 2025

Individual

- UEFA Women's Under-17 Championship top scorer: 2023
- UEFA Women's Under-17 Championship Team of the Tournament: 2023
- UEFA Women's Under-19 Championship Player of the Tournament: 2025
- UEFA Women's Under-19 Championship Team of the Tournament: 2025
- Première Ligue Player of the Month: April 2026
