= Vicky López =

Spanish footballer (born 2006)

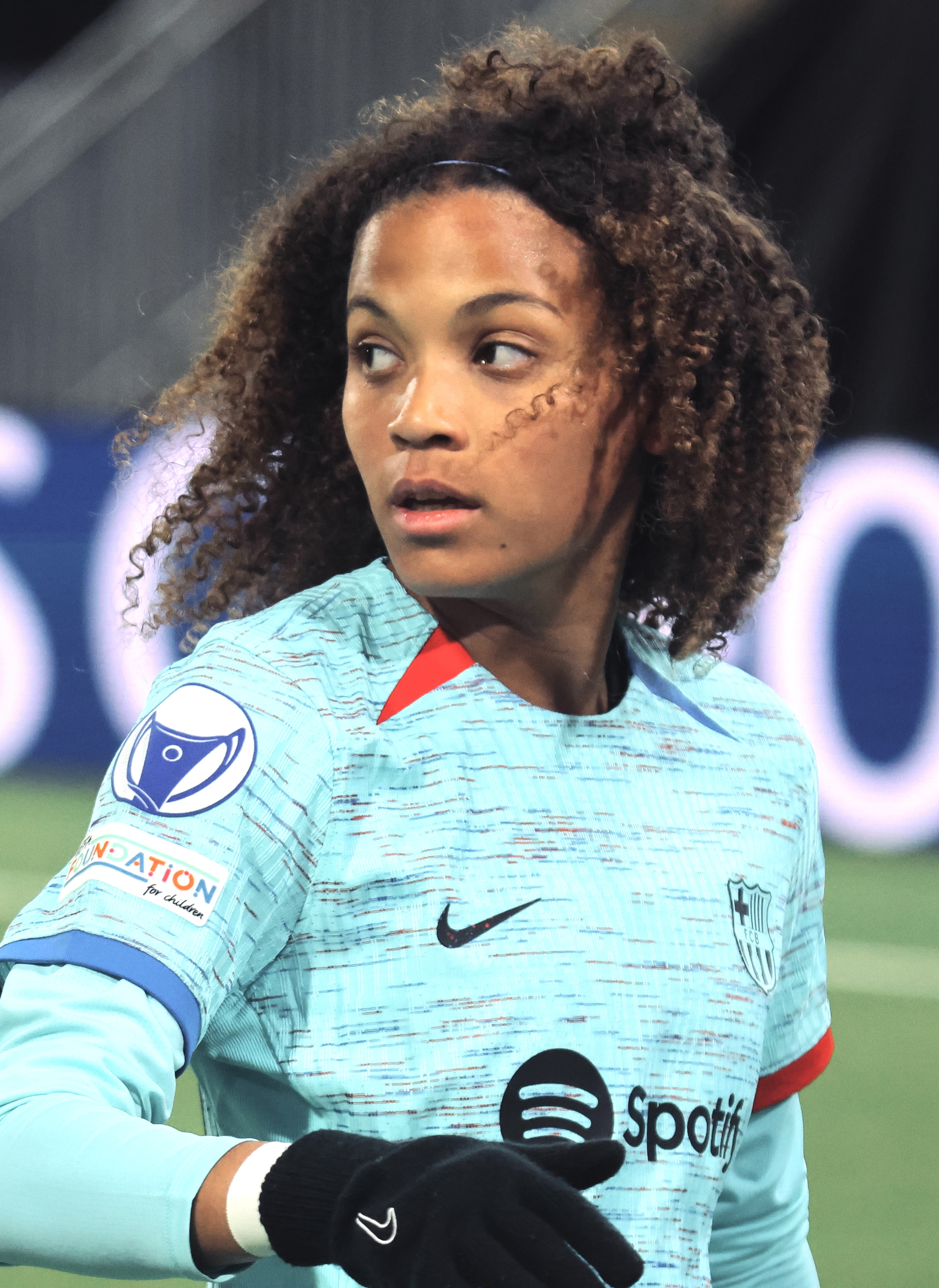
- López with Barcelona in 2024

Personal information
- Full name: Victoria López Serrano Felix
- Date of birth: 26 July 2006 (age 20)
- Place of birth: Madrid, Spain
- Height: 1.60 m (5 ft 3 in)
- Positions: Attacking midfielder; winger

Team information
- Current team: Barcelona
- Number: 19

Youth career
- Madrid CFF

Senior career*
Years	Team	Apps	(Gls)
2021–2022	Madrid CFF B	20	(14)
2021–2022	Madrid CFF	8	(0)
2022–2024	Barcelona B	23	(3)
2022–	Barcelona	78	(29)

International career^{‡}
2021–2023	Spain U17	26	(14)
2023–	Spain U19	4	(2)
2024–	Spain	22	(7)
Medal record
Women's football
Representing Spain
UEFA Women's Championship
Runner-up	2025 Switzerland
UEFA Women's Nations League
Winner	2024 France–Netherlands–Spain
FIFA U-17 Women's World Cup
Winner	2022 India
UEFA Women's Under-17 Championship
Runner-up	2022 Bosnia and Herzegovina
Runner-up	2023 Estonia
- * Club domestic league appearances and goals as of 20:26, 10 May 2024 (UTC) ‡ National team caps and goals as of 04:39, 6 June 2026 (UTC)

Victoria López Serrano Felix (Spanish pronunciation: [biɣˈtoɾja‿ˈβiki ˈlopeθ seˈrano ˈfeliɣs]; born 26 July 2006) is a Spanish professional footballer who plays as an attacking midfielder and a winger for Liga F club Barcelona and the Spain national team.

López began her club career in the youth sections of Madrid CFF in 2015, where she stood out as one of the best young female prospects in Spain. She made her debut in Liga F at age 15, becoming the youngest-ever player in Spain's top women's division. She later moved to FC Barcelona in 2022, where she broke multiple club records due to her age, being the youngest player to debut for FC Barcelona women's team, to play in the Champions League for any FC Barcelona team, and debut and score in a Clásico (women's or men's). With Barcelona, she has won two league titles, two Supercopa de España titles, one Copa de la Reina title, and two UEFA Women's Champions League titles, as well as two Spanish second division league titles with Barcelona's reserve team.

As part of Spain's youth national teams since 2021, López has found success with Spain's under-17 team, finishing runner-up in the Under-17 Euro in both 2022 and 2023, and winning the 2022 FIFA U-17 Women's World Cup. In this competition, she was awarded the Golden Ball trophy as the best player of the tournament. She made her senior debut in 2024, becoming the youngest player to play for the Spain women's national football team. In her second appearance for Spain, they won the 2024 UEFA Women's Nations League Finals.

== Early life ==
Victoria López Serrano Felix was born on 26 July 2006 in the Vallecas neighborhood of Madrid to Jesús López Serrano Pérez and Joy Felix. Her father is Spanish and her mother was Nigerian. Her mother was a business owner in López's early childhood but was forced to close the family business due to the 2008 financial crisis. López has an older brother who she would often play football with starting at age 4, and as she got older, she joined organised girls' teams and played against girls that were four years older than her.

López's mother died from a brain tumour in 2018, when López was 11 years old. As her mother was spending long periods in the hospital near the end of her life, Madrid CFF's president and the club's players helped take López to and from training, as her father was not able to. As a frequent goal celebration, she will often look up and point to the sky after scoring in remembrance of her mother.

== Club career ==
=== Youth football ===
López' earliest experience with a club was playing as a centre-back in a 7-a-side girls' football team, C.D. Sport Villa, based in Vallecas. Around the same time that she began playing in girls' football teams, she was approached by Alba Mellado, who captained Madrid CFF and coached some of their girls' youth sections. Mellado attempted to convince López to join Madrid CFF's youth ranks, but she and her parents wanted to keep her on the same team with her friends.

She played at Sport Villa for half a season before her father pulled her out of the club, as she was not doing well in school and was getting into fights with her brother; she was not allowed to play football for half a year, during which time she took up horse riding. After this, López went to a summer training camp for Rayo Vallecano where she was coached by footballer Paloma Lázaro, who wanted her to join Rayo's youth ranks. She ultimately went to Madrid CFF.

=== Madrid CFF ===
==== Youth, 2015–21 ====
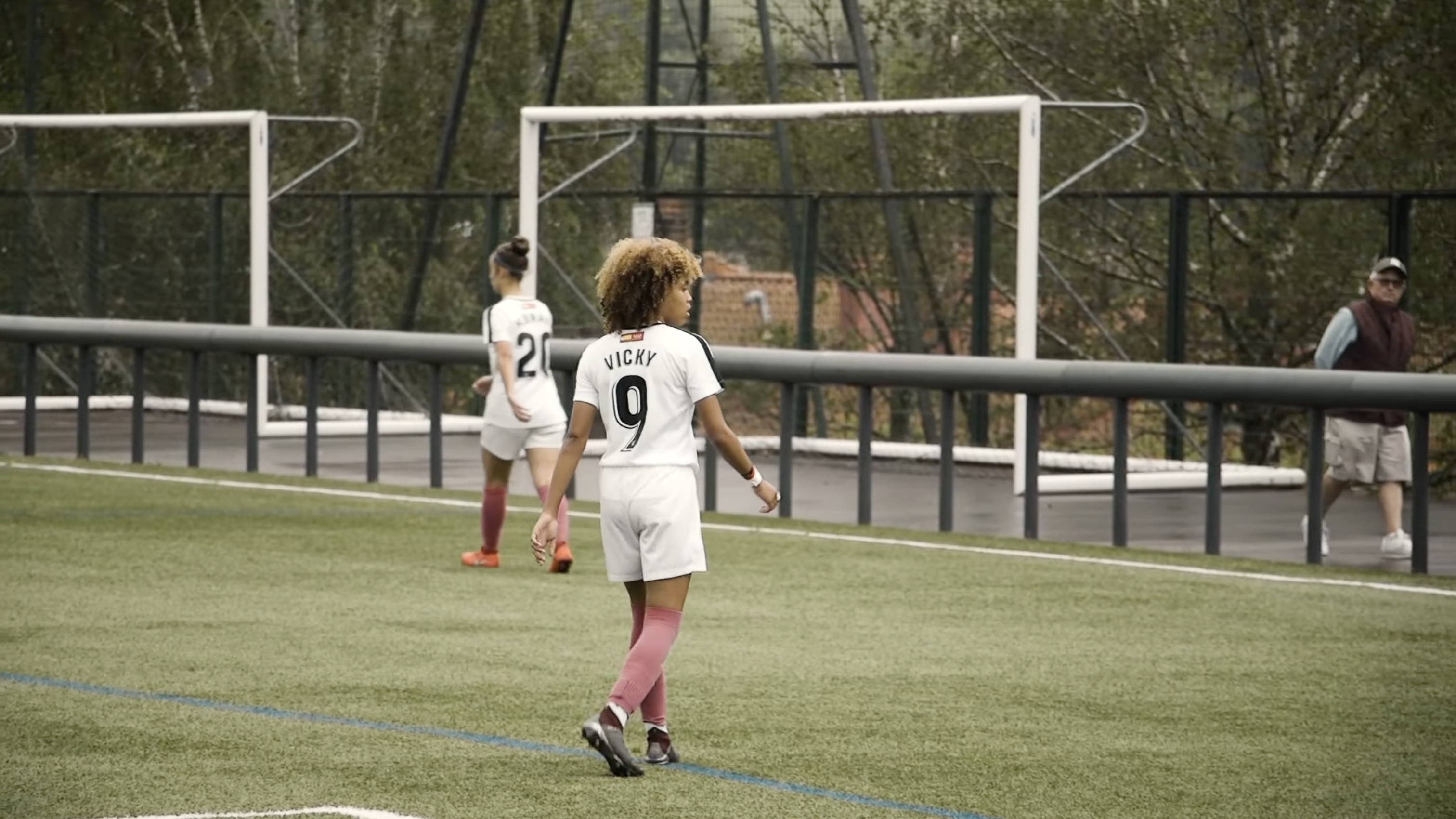
López with Madrid CFF in 2019

Following a summer training camp, López planned to join Rayo Vallecano's youth section but changed her mind after meeting Madrid CFF's Mellado again, on a summer holiday in Benidorm. Mellado was accompanied by Madrid CFF's president, Alfredo Ulloa, and goalkeeper, Paola Ulloa, and had been wearing a Rayo shirt, which caught López's attention. Though López's parents again refused her joining the club, Mellado was allowed to spend the next few days with the family, bonding with López and going through training drills on the beach. López's parents eventually agreed to let her undergo trials at the club, which she passed, joining the club at 9 years old. She entered competition at the under-10 (benjamín) level.

In 2019, López competed in the first La Liga Promesas Femenina, a tournament played amongst the under-12 sections of most teams in the Spanish first division. She scored seven goals – including a hat-trick in the final – and was named tournament MVP. She scored 60 goals in 17 matches during the 2020–21 youth league season.

==== Senior, 2021–22 ====
López had to reach the minimum age of 15 before she was able to debut with Madrid CFF's senior team. On 5 September 2021, she became the youngest player to debut in Spain's first division at just 15 years old when she entered the match to replace Geyse in the 73rd minute against Athletic Bilbao.

=== Barcelona ===
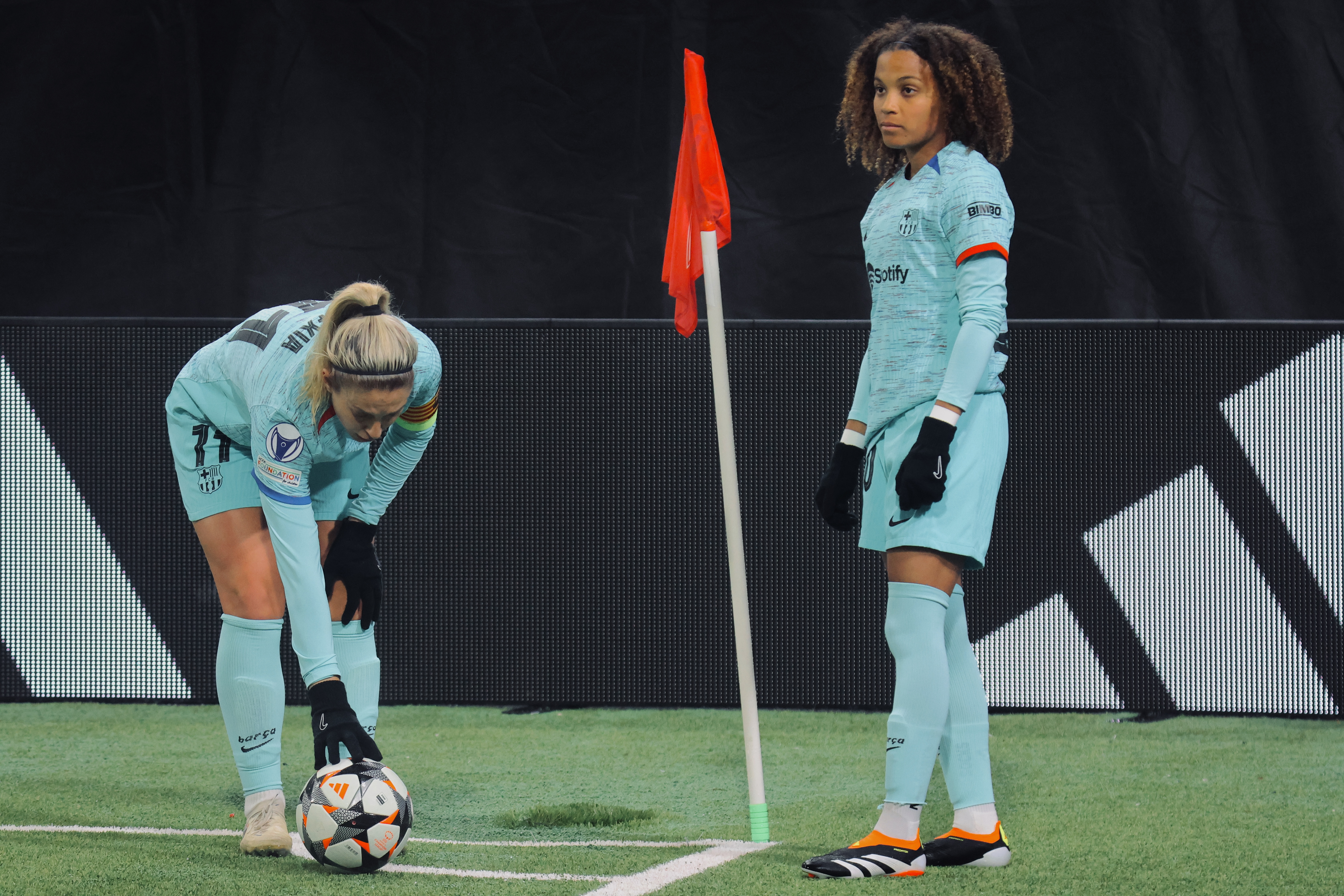
López (right) preparing to take a corner kick with Alexia Putellas (left) in a UEFA Women's Champions League match against Brann

==== 2022–23 ====
On 26 July 2022, on her 16th birthday López joined FC Barcelona on a five-year contract. She started at the club primarily as a B team player who also trained and sometimes played with the first team. Her first appearance for the first team came on 17 September 2022, when she was given a start in a 2–0 home win against UD Tenerife. She became the youngest debutante for Barcelona's first team in the professional era, at 16 years and 49 days old. In November, she became the youngest-ever player, male or female, to feature in a Clásico match when Barcelona won 4–0 over Real Madrid. She later went on to become the youngest player to compete in the Champions League with FC Barcelona, debuting on 21 December at 16 years and 148 days old, beating Ansu Fati's record of 16 years and 321 days old. A month later on 25 January 2023, she made history by becoming the youngest goalscorer in Barcelona's senior team history when she scored in their 7–0 victory over Levante Las Planas in the league.

López continued to compete with Barcelona B at the same time that she began to play more regularly with the first team. She scored her first goal for Barcelona B on 5 March 2023, the first goal in a 3–0 win against Athletic Club B. López won her first senior title with Barcelona on 1 May 2023, when the club won the 2022–23 Spanish league with a 3–0 win over Sporting Huelva. On the same day, she won her first title with Barcelona B, who were crowned champions of the 2022–23 Primera Federación, Spain's second-tier women's football league.

==== 2023–24 ====
In the 2023–24 season, López broke another one of Ansu Fati's records by becoming the youngest player to score a goal in El Clásico, which she accomplished at 17 years and 116 days.

In October 2023, she was included in the 10-women list of finalists for Tuttosport's European Golden Girl award alongside three of her Barcelona teammates. López made many appearances for the first team during the 2023–24 season in which they won a quadruple, consolidating the promise she had shown in her appearances the previous season and becoming reliable in the squad.

== International career ==
=== Youth ===
López competed in multiple youth tournaments with Spain's under-17 national team, including both the 2022 and 2023 U-17 Euro and the 2022 U-17 World Cup, the latter of which she won.

In the 2022 UEFA Women's Under-17 Championship, Spain finished as runners-up after losing the final on penalties to Germany. López had provided the assist for Spain's equaliser in the final, but missed the fifth penalty in the shoot-out. During the tournament she scored one goal, in a 4–0 win over Norway in the group stage.

The result qualified Spain U-17 for the 2022 FIFA U-17 Women's World Cup as one of the favourites, a tournament they won. López played in each of Spain's group stage matches, and assisted Spain's only goal in their final group stage match, a 1–0 win over China. Finishing second in their group behind Colombia, Spain had an unfavourable draw and played their quarterfinal against Japan; López scored both of Spain's late goals in a 2–1 comeback victory to progress, her only goals in the tournament. Spain defeated Germany in their semi-final and Colombia in the final, with López awarded the Golden Ball as the tournament's best player. Asked about the victory afterwards, López reflected that the U-17 World Cup was "the lowest level title"; ESPN opined that this was a sign of both López' ambition and her familiarity with the game's elite, as she already trained with the first team of Barcelona, considered the best team in the world. Though she did not have a prolific goalscoring tournament, her brace against Japan was significant, and her game play was said by ESPN to be important for Spain to control possession. The website noted that "whenever Spain were in any real trouble, they often just gave her the ball."

In the final year before she began getting called up to Spain's senior national team, she competed with Spain at the 2023 UEFA Women's Under-17 Championship. López had a much more prolific tournament compared to her previous Under-17 Euros campaign, scoring in the group stage, the semifinal, and the final. She scored both goals in Spain's 2–0 victory against Germany in their opening match of the group stage, the first of which was the fastest goal scored in Under-17 Women's Euro history. Spain finished first in their group and reached the semi-final against England, where she scored Spain's first goal in a 3–1 victory, helping advance them to their second consecutive U-17 Euro final. They met France in the final, and Les Bleues held a 3–0 lead over Spain by the 78th minute, with López conceding the penalty that led to France's third goal. She then immediately scored two goals within two minutes, but Spain were unable to overturn their 0–3 deficit and finished the match with a 2–3 loss. In total, she scored 5 goals and was the joint-top goalscorer of the tournament alongside French players Liana Joseph and Maeline Mendy. She earned the Player of the Tournament award for her performances.

=== Senior ===
As López was born to a Spanish father and a Nigerian mother, she was eligible to represent both Spain and Nigeria at international level. According to her father, she was pursued by the Royal Spanish Football Federation since she was young, and never contacted by the Nigeria Football Federation, though López herself mentioned her affection for the Nigerian team and (before she became cap-tied to Spain) suggested she might play for them to honour her mother. López made her senior Spain debut at the 2024 UEFA Women's Nations League Finals, aged 17.

She received her call-up to the squad in February 2024, to play in the playoff stages of the 2023–24 UEFA Women's Nations League A. She won her first cap in the semi-final, subbing on for Jenni Hermoso in a 3–0 win over the Netherlands, becoming the youngest player to debut for the Spain women's team, at 17 years, 6 months, and 27 days. Spain's victory qualified them for the 2024 Olympics, the first Olympic qualification in their history. Spain went on to win the Nations League final against France, when López again replaced Hermoso late in the match. Spain's Nations League victory was Lopez's first senior title with the Spanish national team.

On 10 June 2025, López was called up to the Spain squad for the UEFA Women's Euro 2025.

== Personal life ==
As of 2023, López has a hidden passion for horse riding and is completing her Bachillerato científico.

== Career statistics ==
=== Club ===
As of match played 12 March 2026

Appearances and goals by club, season and competition
Club	Season	League			Cup (Note: Appearances in Copa de la Reina)		Continental (Note: Appearances in UEFA Women's Champions League)		Other		Total	
Club	Season	Division	Apps	Goals	Apps	Goals	Apps	Goals	Apps	Goals	Apps	Goals
Madrid CFF B	2021–22	Segunda División Pro	20	14	–		–		–		20	14
Madrid CFF	2021–22	Primera División	8	0	0	0	–		–		8	0
Barcelona B	2022–23	Primera Federación	15	1	–		–		–		15	1
Barcelona B	2023–24	Primera Federación	8	2	–		–		–		8	2
Barcelona B	Total		23	3	–		–		–		23	3
Barcelona	2022–23	Liga F	10	2	1	0	1	0	0	0	12	2
Barcelona	2023–24	Liga F	23	9	4	0	8	0	2 (Note: Appearances in Supercopa de España)	0	37	9
Barcelona	2024–25	Liga F	25	10	3	0	8	1	1	0	37	11
Barcelona	2025–26	Liga F	20	8	3	0	6	1	2	0	31	9
Barcelona	Total		78	29	11	0	23	2	5	0	117	31
Career total			84	28	5	0	9	0	2	0	100	28

=== International ===
As of match played 18 April 2026

Appearances and goals by national team and year
National team	Year	Apps	Goals
Spain	2024	6	2
Spain	2025	11	3
Spain	2026	4	2
Total		21	7

=== International goals ===
No.	Date	Venue	Opponent	Score	Result	Competition
1.	29 November 2024	Estadio Cartagonova, Cartagena, Spain	South Korea	4–0	5–0	Friendly
2.	29 November 2024	Estadio Cartagonova, Cartagena, Spain	South Korea	5–0	5–0	Friendly
3.	27 June 2025	Butarque, Leganés, Spain	Japan	2–1	3–1	Friendly
4.	3 July 2025	Stadion Wankdorf, Bern, Switzerland	Portugal	2–0	5–0	UEFA Women's Euro 2025
5.	2 December 2025	Metropolitan Stadium, Madrid, Spain	Germany	2–0	3–0	2025 UEFA Women's Nations League Finals
6.	7 March 2026	Mardan Sports Complex, Antalya, Turkey	Ukraine	3–0	3–1	2027 FIFA Women's World Cup qualification
7.	18 April 2026	Estadio Nuevo Arcángel, Córdoba, Spain	Ukraine	5–0	5–0	2027 FIFA Women's World Cup qualification

== Honours ==
FC Barcelona B

- Primera Federación: 2022–23, 2023–24

FC Barcelona

- Liga F: 2022–23, 2023–24, 2024–25, 2025–26
- Copa de la Reina: 2023–24, 2024–25, 2025–26
- Supercopa de España: 2022–23, 2023–24, 2024–25, 2025–26
- UEFA Women's Champions League: 2022–23, 2023–24, 2025–26

Spain

- UEFA Women's Championship runner-up: 2025
- UEFA Women's Nations League: 2023–24, 2025

Spain U17

- FIFA U-17 Women's World Cup: 2022
- UEFA Women's Under-17 Championship runner-up: 2022, 2023

Individual

- Kopa Trophy: 2025, 2026
- Golden Girl: 2024
- IFFHS Women's World's Best Youth Player: 2024, 2025
- FIFA U-17 Women's World Cup Golden Ball: 2022
- UEFA Women's Under-17 Championship Player of the Tournament: 2023
- UEFA Women's Under-17 Championship Team of the Tournament: 2023
- IFFHS Women's Youth (U20) World Team: 2022, 2023, 2024
- IFFHS Women's Youth (U20) UEFA Team: 2023, 2024
- La Liga Promesas Femenina Best Player: 2019
- La Liga Promesas Femenina Top Goalscorer: 2019
