= Laura Benkarth =

German footballer (born 1992)

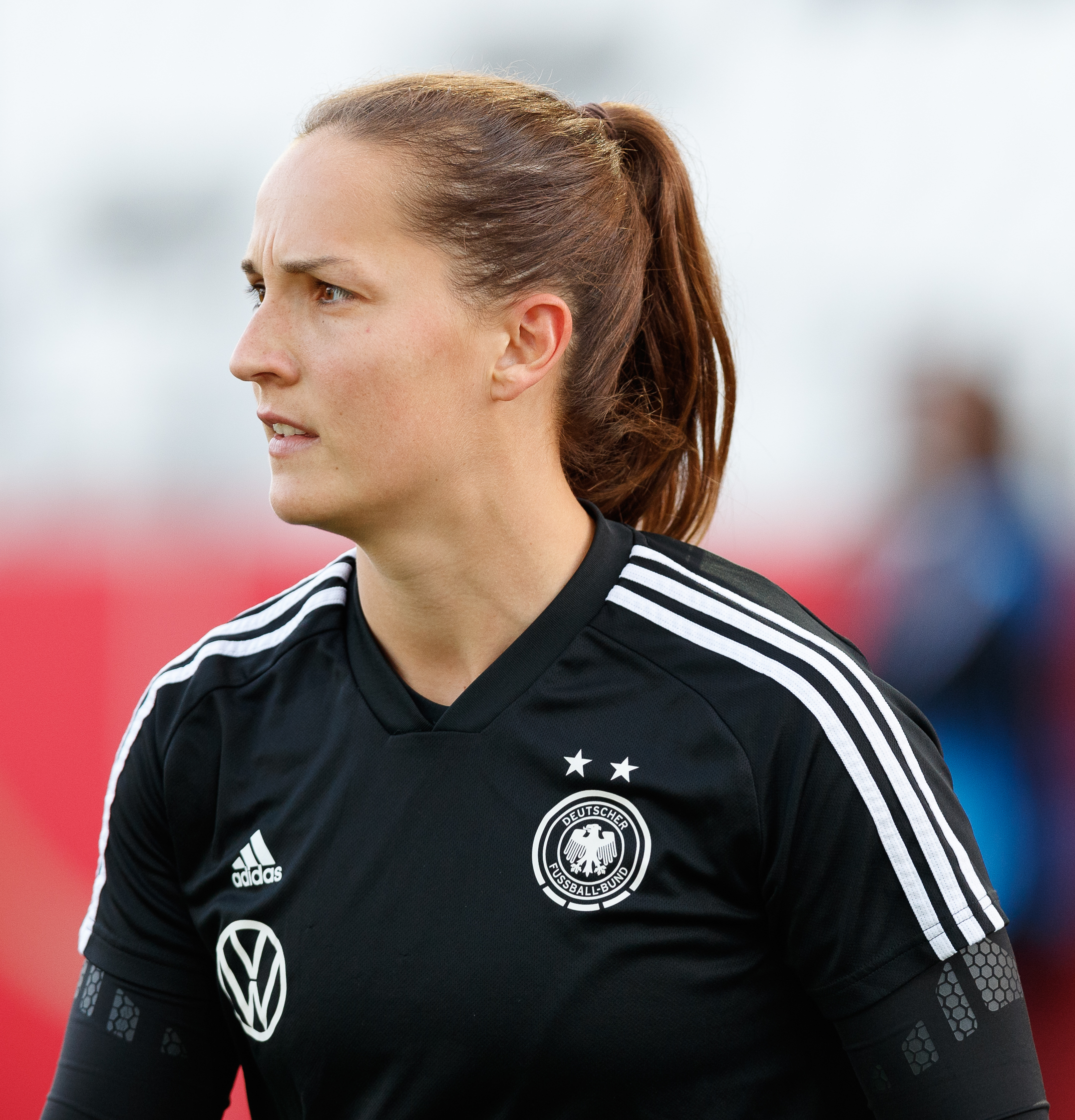
- Benkarth in 2021

Personal information
- Full name: Laura Anna Benkarth
- Date of birth: 14 October 1992 (age 34)
- Place of birth: Freiburg im Breisgau, Germany
- Height: 1.73 m (5 ft 8 in)
- Position: Goalkeeper

Team information
- Current team: SC Freiburg
- Number: 1

Youth career
- 2008: FC Wolfenweiler-Schallstadt
- 2008–2009: SC Freiburg

Senior career*
Years	Team	Apps	(Gls)
2009–2018	SC Freiburg	137	(0)
2018–2023	Bayern Munich	51	(0)
2023–2025	Lyon	9	(0)
2025–	SC Freiburg	16	(0)

International career^{‡}
2008	Germany U16	1	(0)
2009	Germany U17	1	(0)
2010–2011	Germany U19	9	(0)
2011–2012	Germany U20	10	(0)
2015–	Germany	11	(0)
Medal record
Women's football
Representing Germany
Olympic Games
Gold medal – first place	2016 Rio de Janeiro	Team
UEFA Women's Championship
Gold medal – first place	2013 Sweden
- * Club domestic league appearances and goals as of 26 April 2026 ‡ National team caps and goals as of 20:01, 15 June 2021 (UTC)

Laura Anna Benkarth (born 14 October 1992) is a German footballer who plays for SC Freiburg and the German national team.

== Club career ==
Benkarth began her career at SV Biengen and FC Wolfenweiler-Schallstadt. In 2008, she arrived in the youth department of the SC Freiburg where she played for the B-Jugend. In 2009, she moved to the senior squad as a second goalkeeper and made his debut on 20 September 2009 (1st Round) in the 0:1 defeat at home to the FF USV Jena. In her first season, she was used only three times at senior level. In her second season, Benkarth played 13 games and her participation increased in the third season with 22 appearances. In 2014, with the departure of Caroline Abbé to FC Bayern Munich, she was nominated the new team captain. Benkarth became the undisputed first-choice goalkeeper. In the 2017–18 season, she finished third in the league with Freiburg. For the 2018–19 season, she transferred to FC Bayern Munich and suffered an ACL injury in the summer. She returned to the pitch in the spring of 2019. With Bayern Munich, she won the German championship twice. Initially still the first-choice goalkeeper, she lost her starting position to Maria Luisa Grohs after suffering another severe knee injury in 2021.

She signed with Lyon in 2023. Benkarth made eleven appearances as the second-choice goalkeeper behind Christiane Endler and won the French championship twice with her club.

For the 2025–26 season, she returned to SC Freiburg. She was fielded in the season opener on 7 September 2025 in a 1–1 away draw against Werder Bremen and has been the first-choice goalkeeper ever since. In the 1–3 defeat to VfL Wolfsburg on 5 December 2025, she made her 200th Bundesliga appearance. Since February 2026, she has been on a break due to pregnancy.

== International career ==
In 2007, she was on the Germany U17 squad which was the champion in the 2009 UEFA Women's Under-17 Championship. With the Germany U19 team in 2010, Benkarth took part in the 2010 UEFA Women's Under-19 Championship in Macedonia. The team reached the semi-finals, but lost, for the future champion, France in the penalties (5–3). That same year she was part of the national team that won the 2010 FIFA U-20 Women's World Cup in their own country, remained as the third goalkeeper behind Almuth Schult and Desirée Schumann without playing any match. In the 2012 FIFA U-20 Women's World Cup in Japan she played every minute in all six matches, Germany played in the tournament without conceding one single goal (clean sheet). Germany only lost in the final against the United States, for the minimum score, 1:0 (goal scored by Kealia Ohai). Benkarth was named the best goalkeeper of the tournament with the "Golden Glove". In October 2012 Benkarth was nominated for the senior national team for the first time. In until 28 July 2013 she was called for the UEFA Women's Euro 2013 in Sweden, replacing Kathrin Längert in the squad.

She was part of the squad for the 2016 Summer Olympics, where Germany won the gold medal.

== Career statistics ==
=== International ===
As of 18 September 2021

Germany
Year	Apps	Goals
2015	1	0
2016	2	0
2017	5	0
2020	2	0
2021	1	0
Total	11	0

== Honours ==
Bayern Munich

- Frauen-Bundesliga: 2020–21, 2022–23

Olympique Lyon

- Première Ligue: 2024, 2025

Germany U-17

- UEFA U-17 Women's Championship: 2009

Germany U-20

- FIFA U-20 Women's World Cup: 2010

Germany

- Summer Olympic Games Gold medal: 2016
- UEFA Women's Championship: 2013

Individual

- FIFA U-20 Women's World Cup Golden Glove: 2012
