= Liana Joseph =

French footballer (born 2006)

Personal information
- Full name: Liana Lina Joseph
- Date of birth: 15 August 2006 (age 20)
- Place of birth: Bondy, France
- Height: 1.65 m (5 ft 5 in)
- Position: Forward

Team information
- Current team: Lyon
- Number: 31

Youth career
- 2015–2020: Paris FC
- 2020–2022: CO Vincennes
- 2022–2023: Lyon

Senior career*
Years	Team	Apps	(Gls)
2023–2024	Lyon B	4	(3)
2023–	Lyon	13	(7)
2025	→ Strasbourg (loan)	5	(3)

International career^{‡}
2022–2023	France U17	13	(10)
2023–2025	France U19	13	(11)
2024	France U20	4	(4)
2026–	France U23	2	(2)
Medal record
Women's football
Representing France
UEFA Women's Under-19 Championship
Runner-up	2025 Poland
UEFA Women's Under-17 Championship
Winner	2023 Estonia
- * Club domestic league appearances and goals as of 22 November 2026 ‡ National team caps and goals as of 12 October 2026

Liana Lina Joseph (born 15 August 2006) is a French professional footballer who plays as a forward for Première Ligue club Lyon.

== Early life ==
Joseph was born in a family of Haitian descent in Bondy. Her father Othlinds was a footballer for Maccabi Paris and her uncle Berley played for Troyes and Paris FC.

== Club career ==
Joseph started playing football in the youth categories of Paris FC, usually mixed with boys. After finishing as top scorer in the 2019 Danone Nations Cup, she was admitted to the Lyon youth team. She won the 2022-23 France national U-19 Women's Championship with Lyon and finished as top scorer with 27 goals, including 5 goals against Paris Saint-Germain in the deciding match in the last round of the league.

== International career ==
Joseph represented France under-17s during the 2023 UEFA Women's Under-17 Championship held in Estonia. She scored a brace in the final against Spain in a 3–2 victory to lead France winning their first European Under-17 title in their history. With 5 goals scored during the tournament, she shared the top scorer award with her teammate Maeline Mendy and Spanish team player Vicky López.

== Honours ==
Lyon

- Première Ligue: 2023–24, 2024–25
- Coupe de France Féminine: 2025–26
- Coupe LFFP: 2025–26

France U17

- UEFA Women's Under-17 Championship: 2023

France U19

- UEFA Women's Under-19 Championship runner-up: 2025

Individual

- UEFA Women's Under-17 Championship top scorer: 2023
- UEFA Women's Under-17 Championship Team of the Tournament: 2023
- UEFA Women's Under-19 Championship top scorer: 2025
- UEFA Women's Under-19 Championship Team of the Tournament: 2025
