= Romain Djoubri =

French football manager (born 1973)

Personal information
- Date of birth: 30 July 1973 (age 53)
- Place of birth: France

Managerial career
- Years: Team
- 2014–2017: Rouen
- 2017–2023: Oissel
- 2023–2024: Le Havre (women)

Romain Djoubri (born 30 July 1973) is a French professional football manager who is the former head coach of Première Ligue club Le Havre.

== Career ==
Djoubri managed Rouen from 2014 to 2017 and Oissel from 2017 to 2023. On 15 June 2023, he became the head coach of Division 1 Féminine club Le Havre. He succeeded Frédéric Gonçalves, who had led the team to an eighth-place finish in the previous season.

== Personal life ==
Born in France, Djoubri holds both French and Algerian nationality.
