= Louise Fleury =

French footballer (born 1997)

Personal information
- Full name: Louise Fleury
- Date of birth: 8 August 1997 (age 29)
- Place of birth: L'Aigle, France
- Height: 1.67 m (5 ft 6 in)
- Position: Forward

Team information
- Current team: Les Marseillaises
- Number: 7

Youth career
- 2006–2009: US Rugles
- 2009–2013: Pays Aiglon
- 2013–2016: Guingamp

Senior career*
Years	Team	Apps	(Gls)
2013–2022	Guingamp	126	(19)
2022–2024	Paris FC	44	(8)
2024–2026	Nantes	43	(3)
2026–	Les Marseillaises	0	(0)

International career
2015–2016	France U19	6	(0)
2016	France U20	6	(0)
2018–2021	France U23	9	(1)
Medal record
Representing France
Women's football
FIFA U-20 Women's World Cup
Runner-up	2016 Papua New Guinea
UEFA Women's Under-19 Championship
Winner	2016 Slovakia
- * Club domestic league appearances and goals as of 20:49, 29 June 2026 (UTC)

Louise Fleury (born 8 August 1997 ) is a French professional footballer who plays as a forward for Première Ligue club Les Marseillaises.

== Club career ==
Fleury made her league debut against Saint-Étienne on 15 December 2013. In July 2016, she extended her contract with Guingamp. Fleury scored her first league goal against Bordeaux on 16 October 2016, scoring in the 20th minute.

On 30 June 2022, Fleury was announced at Paris FC, signing a three year contract. On 3 November 2023, she was nominated to win the D1 Arkema Player of the Month Trophy for October. During her time at Paris FC, she played 58 matches and scored 10 goals.

On 30 July 2024, Fleury was announced at Nantes. She went on to spend two seasons at the club, contributing to a fourth-place finish in her second year.

Les Marseillaises announced the signing of Fleury on a two-year deal on 29 June 2026.

== International career ==
Fleury has represented France at youth level.

Fleury was called up to the senior French national team on 19 November 2019.
