= Mylène Chauvot =

French footballer (born 1970)

Personal information
- Date of birth: 19 August 1970 (age 56)
- Place of birth: Mâcon, France
- Position: Forward

Senior career*
Years	Team	Apps	(Gls)
1990–1998	Lyon		

International career
1990–1992	France	13	(2)
- * Club domestic league appearances and goals

Mylène Chauvot (French pronunciation: [milɛn ʃovo], born 19 August 1970) is a retired French professional footballer who played as a forward for French club Lyon and the France national team.

== International career ==
Chauvot was represented France 13 times and scored 2 goals.

== Honours ==
- Division 1 Féminine
  - Winners (4): 1989–90, 1992–93, 1994–95, 1997–98
