= Noemi Ivelj =

Swiss association football player

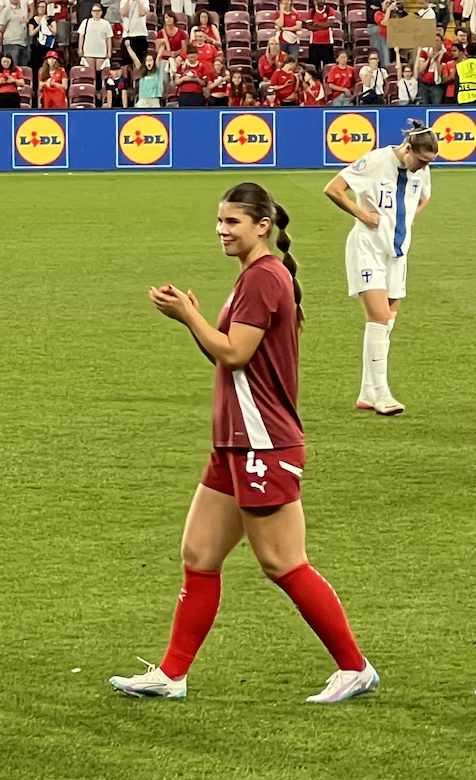
- Noemi Ivelj with Switzerland in 2025.

Personal information
- Date of birth: 1 November 2006 (age 20)
- Height: 1.71 m (5 ft 7 in)
- Position: Midfielder

Team information
- Current team: Eintracht Frankfurt
- Number: 4

Senior career*
Years	Team	Apps	(Gls)
2022–2025	Grasshoppers	49	(2)
2025–	Eintracht Frankfurt	27	(0)

International career^{‡}
2021–2022	Switzerland U16	2	(0)
2021–2023	Switzerland U17	15	(1)
2023–2025	Switzerland U19	7	(3)
2023–	Switzerland	12	(1)
- * Club domestic league appearances and goals as of 21 November 2026 ‡ National team caps and goals as of 28 June 2025

Noemi Ivelj (born 1 November 2006) is a Swiss professional footballer who plays as a midfielder for Frauen-Bundesliga club Eintracht Frankfurt and for the Switzerland national team.

== Club career ==
Ivelj began her senior club career at Grasshopper Club Zurich in 2022, joining for the 2022–23 season.

In 2025, Ivelj secured a move to Germany, signing a four-year contract with Frauen-Bundesliga club Eintracht Frankfurt beginning in the 2025–26 season.

== International career ==
Ivelj was part of Switzerland's 23-player squad for the UEFA Women's Euro 2025, held on home soil.

== Personal life ==
Ivelj's father is of Croatian descent and the mother of Serbian descent. She is fluent in Swiss German, English and Serbian/Croatian.
