= OL Lyonnes =

Women's association football club based in Lyon, France

- Full name: Olympique Lyonnais Lyonnes
- Nicknames: Les Fenottes; Les Lyonnaises
- Founded: 1970; 56 years ago (as FC Lyon); 2004; 22 years ago (as Olympique Lyonnais)
- Stadium: Parc Olympique Lyonnais; Décines-Charpieu
- Capacity: 59,186
- Owner: Olympe Bidco
- President: Michele Kang
- Head coach: Jonatan Giráldez
- League: Première Ligue
- 2025–26: Première Ligue, 1st of 12 (champions)
- Website: www.ol-lyonnes.com
Home colours	Away colours	Third colours

OL Lyonnes, formerly known as Olympique Lyonnais Féminin (French pronunciation: [ɔlɛ̃pik ljɔnɛ]) and still commonly known as Lyon or simply OL, is a French professional women's football club based in Lyon. The club has been the female section of Olympique Lyonnais since 2004. It is the most successful club in the history of the Première Ligue, with eighteen league titles as Olympique Lyonnais and four league titles as FC Lyon before the acquisition.

Since the 2010s, Lyon has frequently been named one of the strongest women's teams in the world, and has been cited as a model for the development of women's football in both economic and cultural terms. The team has won a record eight UEFA Women's Champions League titles, including a record five successive titles from 2016 to 2020, as well as fourteen consecutive domestic league titles from 2007 to 2020. They have also won five trebles when the top-level continental competition is considered, the most for any team.

== History ==
The club was formed as the women's section of FC Lyon in 1970. In 2004, the women's club became the women's section of Olympique Lyonnais. Since joining Lyon, the women's section has won the Division 1 Féminine fourteen times and the Coupe de France nine times. Lyon reached the semi-finals of the 2007–08 edition of the UEFA Women's Cup and, during the 2009–10 season, reached the final of the inaugural edition of the UEFA Women's Champions League, losing to German club Turbine Potsdam 7–6 on penalties. In the following season, Lyon finally captured the UEFA Women's Champions League, defeating its nemesis Turbine Potsdam 2–0 in the 2011 final. It successfully defended its title in 2012, defeating FFC Frankfurt in the final.

From 2016 to 2020, the club won five consecutive Champions League titles, equaling the male record held by Real Madrid. Four players: Sarah Bouhaddi, Amel Majri, Wendie Renard, and Eugénie Le Sommer have all won eight Champions League trophies. They are listed by the Guinness World Records as the "Most Women's Champions League wins by a player".

Lyon's main rivalry is with Paris Saint-Germain, with matches between the two teams sometimes referred as the "Classique féminin". Paris is OL's main contender for national titles, as they finished in second place of D1 Féminine seven times. Lyon had never lost the D1 title to PSG until 2021 when PSG finished ahead of Lyon, and won five Coupe de France finals against Paris. In 2017 both teams reached the Champions League final, with Lyon beating Paris after a penalty shoot-out and winning its fourth title in the competition.

Lyon hosts its matches at the Stade Gérard Houllier, a stadium of capacity 1,524 located in the Groupama OL Training Center and situated not far from the larger Parc Olympique Lyonnais (sometime called Groupama Stadium) where the male teams play. The women's team does host its "big" matches such as UEFA Women's Champions League at the 59,000-seat stadium. Often identified as the "tallest [woman] footballer", Wendie Renard had been a long-term captain (and also of the France women's national football team) of the team, having one of the most prolific careers, including most titles won (with Le Sommer), most final appearance and top all-time appearances in the Champions League. According to the UEFA women's coefficient, Lyon was the highest-ranked club in UEFA in 2014, and second in 2025, behind FC Barcelona Femení.

As Michele Kang took over the club in 2024, her immediate action was to have higher-capacity home ground. Groupama OL Training Center has only 1,200 seats. In the 2024–25 season, home matches were played at different cities like Bourg-en-Bresse, Grenoble, and Bourgoin-Jallieu. She negotiated with the Lyon OU Rugby to share their home stadium, the Matmut Stadium de Gerland, having a seating capacity of 25,000. However, she was able to convince the OL Groupe to allow the use of Parc Olympique Lyonnais. On 19 May 2025, Kang announced that Parc Olympique Lyonnais will be their home ground from the following season, and that she had taken over the men's training centre, which she will transform into one that is "better than most men's teams's training centres."

On 1 June 2025, the club announced the departure of head coach Joe Montemurro, after one year of his contract. He leaves with a league title under his belt, to take up an opportunity with the Australian women's national team. The following day, 2 June 2025, OL Lyonnes announced the appointment of Jonatan Giráldez as their new head coach, on a contract until June 2028.

== Club identity ==
The club's previous names (FC Lyon and Olympique Lyonnais Féminin) were direct references to the city of Lyon. On 19 May 2025, Kang announced the new name as "OL Lyonnes"; OL referring to the parent club and lyonnes as a portmanteau of the city and lionnes, a French word for "lionnesses". She explained that y was used in place of i to retain reference to the city, and the parent club, but entirely dropping féminin to designate the club as a separate management from that of the men's, as she said, "We wanted to emphasize that lionesses are different than lions."

Along with unveiling the new name, a new logo was introduced which shows the head part of a roaring red lioness with blue and gold accents, and a crest above it. To make a distinction from the counterpart men's club that has a lion as an emblem, Kang explained that she was inspired by her safari to Africa where she learnt that it was the lionesses who do most of the work such as hunting and caring for the pride, saying: "I'm talking in real life, male lions sleep 22 hours out of 24 hours. So if you think about the lioness, who's really roaring; the fears, competitiveness, protecting and surviving, all those things to us, that was the spirit of the lioness." The golden crest signifies the club's success in the highest-level competitions. The club will also adopt a new slogan: Nouvelle Histoire, Même Légende ("New Story, Same Legend").

== Ownership and finances ==
Lyon Féminin is part of OL Groupe, whose majority shareholder since December 2022 is Eagle Football Group, which is controlled by American businessman John Textor. Club president Jean-Michel Aulas was also OL Groupe's previous and founding owner, and remains a minority owner of OL Groupe and board director of Eagle Football Group.

As of April 2023, L'Équipe reported that Lyon Féminin operated at a €12 million annual deficit.

On 16 May 2023, OL Groupe and Michele Kang announced the formation of a separate entity that would be composed of Kang's Washington Spirit of the NWSL, and Olympique Lyon Féminin. OL Groupe would sell its NWSL club, OL Reign, to resolve conflicts of interest. OL Groupe would retain a 48% stake in the resulting new entity, and Kang would become the club's majority owner and CEO, pending regulatory approval. Kang's proposed deal for the women's side reportedly valued it at $54.4 million. Kang attended Lyon's victory in the Coupe de France féminine finals on 13 May 2023 and raised the trophy with the team.

In February 2024, Kang and Vincent Ponsot, the CEO of Lyon Féminin, jointly announced the completion of the ownership deal, with Kang becoming the majority owner at 52.9%. In July 2024, Kang announced the launch of Kynisca Sports International, Ltd., a London-based company that would serve as the umbrella group for her multi-team sports ownership, including Lyon Féminin, Washington Spirit and London City Lionesses. The company was named after Cynisca of Sparta, the first woman to win an event in the ancient Olympic Games. Kang simultaneously announced the launch of $50 million in seed and matching funding for the Kynisca Innovation Hub, a non-profit research initiative specialized in female sports training.

In July 2026, Kang also acquired a majority stake at the men's team, creating a new umbrella group exclusively for Olympique Lyonnais and OL Lyonnes, under the name of Olympe BidCo.

== Players ==
=== Current squad ===
As of 12 September 2026

Note: Flags indicate national team as defined under FIFA eligibility rules; some limited exceptions apply. Players may hold more than one non-FIFA nationality.

No.	Pos.	Nation	Player
1	GK	CHI	Christiane Endler
3	DF	FRA	Wendie Renard (captain)
4	DF	FRA	Selma Bacha
5	DF	SWE	Elma Junttila Nelhage
6	MF	HAI	Melchie Dumornay
7	FW	FRA	Vicki Bècho
8	MF	USA	Korbin Shrader
9	FW	FRA	Marie-Antoinette Katoto
10	FW	FRA	Inès Benyahia
11	FW	MAW	Tabitha Chaŵinga
12	DF	CAN	Ashley Lawrence
13	MF	NED	Damaris Egurrola
14	FW	NOR	Ada Hegerberg
15	DF	NOR	Ingrid Engen
16	GK	FRA	Féerine Belhadj
17	MF	FRA	Maïssa Fathallah

No.	Pos.	Nation	Player
19	FW	SWE	Johanna Rytting Kaneryd
20	MF	USA	Lily Yohannes
21	GK	AUS	Teagan Micah
23	MF	SCO	Caroline Weir
24	MF	FRA	Julie Swierot
25	GK	GER	Maria Luisa Grohs
26	DF	FRA	Wassa Sangaré
27	MF	FRA	Ambre Ouazar
28	DF	FRA	Romane Rafalski
29	FW	GER	Jule Brand
30	MF	BRA	Giovanna Waksman
31	FW	FRA	Liana Joseph
33	DF	BRA	Tarciane
36	MF	NOR	Elida Kolbjørnsen
77	FW	ESP	Salma Paralluelo
—	FW	ALG	Sofia Bekhaled

=== Notable former players ===
French

- Eugénie Le Sommer
- Camille Abily
- Mylène Chauvot
- Élodie Thomis
- Corine Petit
- Sonia Bompastor
- Louisa Necib
- Laura Georges
- Élise Bussaglia
- Hoda Lattaf
- Sabrina Viguier
- Sandrine Brétigny
- Sandrine Dusang
- Delphine Blanc
- Laëtitia Tonazzi
- Jessica Houara
- Claire Lavogez
- Pauline Peyraud-Magnin
- Kenza Dali
- Kheira Hamraoui
- Ève Périsset
- Claire Morel
- Séverine Creuzet-Laplantes
- Sarah Bouhaddi
- Amandine Henry
- Griedge Mbock
- Delphine Cascarino
- Melvine Malard
- Perle Morroni

Australian

- Ellie Carpenter

Belgian

- Janice Cayman

Brazilian

- Kátia
- Rosana
- Simone Jatobá

Canadian

- Kadeisha Buchanan

Chinese

- Wang Fei

Costa Rican

- Shirley Cruz

Danish

- Dorte Dalum Jensen
- Line Røddik Hansen

Dutch

- Daniëlle van de Donk
- Shanice van de Sanden

English

- Lucy Bronze
- Izzy Christiansen
- Alex Greenwood
- Nikita Parris

German

- Josephine Henning
- Pauline Bremer
- Carolin Simon
- Sara Däbritz
- Dzsenifer Marozsán

Icelandic

- Sara Björk Gunnarsdóttir

Japanese

- Saki Kumagai
- Shinobu Ohno
- Ami Otaki

New-Zealander

- Erin Nayler

Nigerian

- Cynthia Uwak

Norwegian

- Christine Colombo Nilsen
- Isabell Herlovsen
- Bente Nordby
- Ingvild Stensland
- Andrea Norheim

Portuguese

- Jéssica Silva

Swedish

- Amelie Rybäck
- Lotta Schelin
- Caroline Seger

Swiss

- Lara Dickenmann

American

- Lorrie Fair
- Megan Rapinoe
- Hope Solo
- Aly Wagner
- Christie Welsh
- Alex Morgan
- Morgan Brian
- Lindsey Horan

Welsh

- Jess Fishlock

== Current staff ==
As of 7 August 2024.

Position	Staff
Head coach	(Spain) Jonatan Giráldez
Assistant coaches	(Australia) Joe Palatsides (France) Méline Gérard (Italy) Patrizia Panico
Goalkeeping coach	(France) Simon Pouplin
Director of Performance	(United Kingdom) Jack Sharkey
Physical trainer	(France) Hugo Roche (France) Rémi Pullara
Video analyst	(France) Marceau Goguer
Doctor	(France) Jad Dbouk
Physiotherapists	(Japan) Shingo Kitada (Belgium) Anthony Martin (Netherlands) Ganaelle Rigondaud
Nutritionist	(Mexico) Ana Martinez
Data Analyst	(Portugal) Ana Sena
General manager/team delegate	(France) Julien Legrand
Team manager	(France) David Morreale
Kit manager	(Spain) Amilcar Perez

== Honours ==
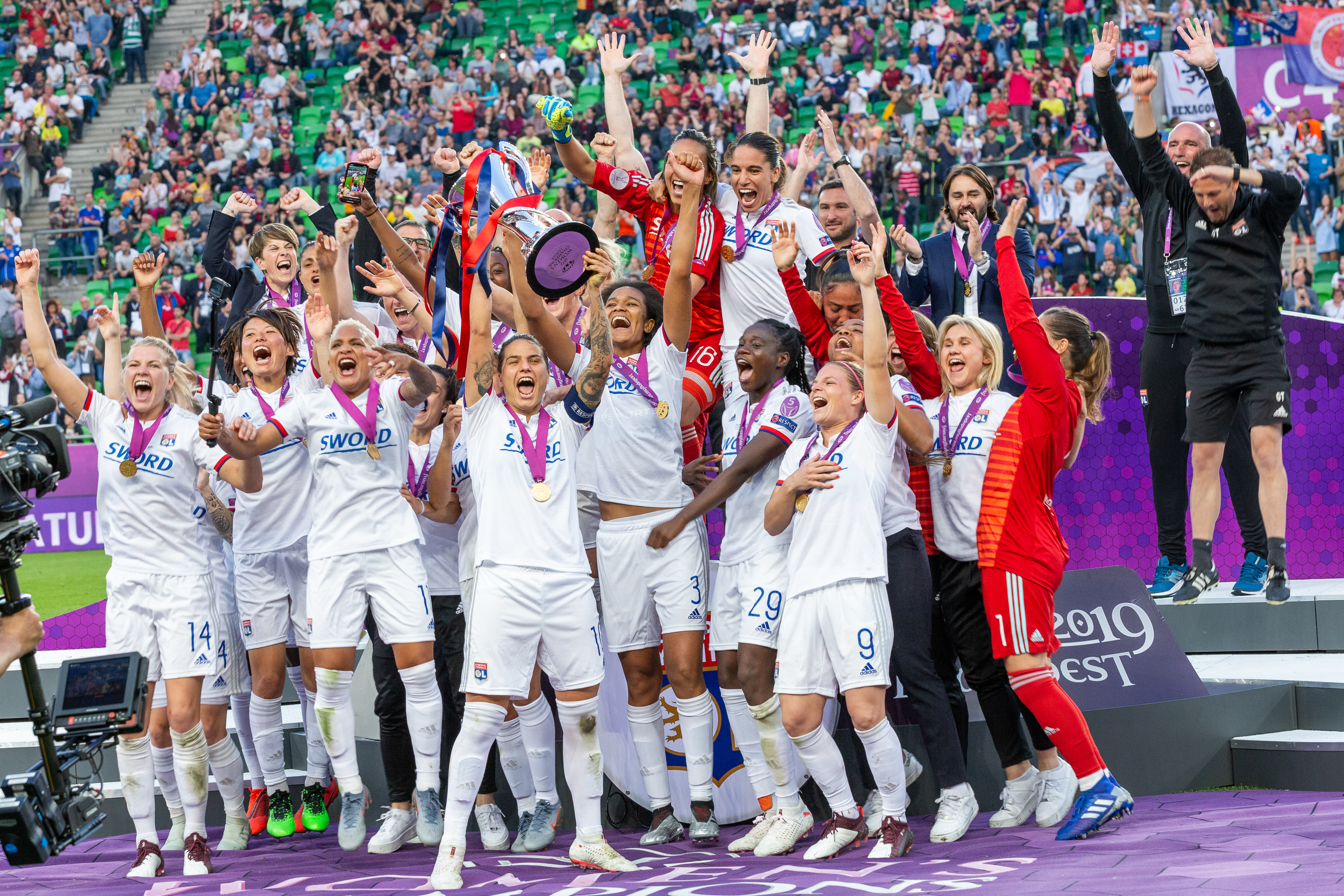
Celebration of the sixth UEFA Women's Champions League in 2019.

=== Official ===
==== Domestic ====
- Division 1 Féminine (Champions of France) (level 1)
  - (19, record): 2006–07, 2007–08, 2008–09, 2009–10, 2010–11, 2011–12, 2012–13, 2013–14, 2014–15, 2015–16, 2016–17, 2017–18, 2018–19, 2019–20, 2021–22, 2022–23, 2023–24, 2024–25, 2025–26
- Coupe de France Féminine
  - (11, record): 2007–08, 2011–12, 2012–13, 2013–14, 2014–15, 2015–16, 2016–17, 2018–19, 2019–20, 2022–23, 2025–26
- Trophée des Championnes
  - (3, record) 2019, 2022, 2023
- Coupe LFFP
  - (1, record) 2025–26

==== Continental ====
- UEFA Women's Champions League
  - (8, record): 2010–11, 2011–12, 2015–16, 2016–17, 2017–18, 2018–19, 2019–20, 2021–22

=== Invitational ===
- International Women's Club Championship
  - Winners: 2012
- Valais Cup
  - Winners: 2014
- Women's International Champions Cup
  - Winners: 2019, 2022
- Trophée Veolia Féminin
  - Winners: 2020

=== Others ===
- Guinness world record for most consecutive victories in all competitions: 41 wins (from 28 April 2012 to 18 May 2013).

== Record in UEFA Women's Champions League ==
As of match played 11 November 2026

Competition	Pld	W	D	L	GF	GA	GD
UEFA Champions League	167	129	21	17	560	96	+464

All results (away, home and aggregate) list Lyon's goal tally first.

Season	Round	Opponents	Away	Home	Agg.
2007–08	First qualifying round	(Slovakia) Slovan Duslo Šaľa	12–0	–	–
2007–08	First qualifying round	(North Macedonia) Škiponjat Struga (Host)	10–0	–	–
2007–08	First qualifying round	(Bosnia and Herzegovina) Sarajevo	7–0	–	–
2007–08	Second qualifying round	(Denmark) Brøndby	–	0–0	–
2007–08	Second qualifying round	(Norway) Kolbotn	–	1–0	–
2007–08	Second qualifying round	(Czech Republic) Sparta Prague	–	2–1	–
2007–08	Quarter-final	(England) Arsenal	3–2	0–0 ^{f}	3–2
2007–08	Semi-final	(Sweden) Umeå	0–0	1–1 ^{f}	1–1 (a)
2008–09	Second qualifying round	(Austria) Neulengbach	–	8–0	–
2008–09	Second qualifying round	(Switzerland) Zürich	–	7–1	–
2008–09	Second qualifying round	(England) Arsenal	–	3–0	–
2008–09	Quarter-final	(Italy) Verona	5–0 ^{f}	4–1	9–1
2008–09	Semi-final	(Germany) Duisburg	1–3	1–1 ^{f}	2–4
2009–10	Round of 32	(Serbia) Mašinac Niš	1–0 ^{f}	5–0	6–0
2009–10	Round of 16	(Denmark) Fortuna Hjørring	1–0 ^{f}	5–0	6–0
2009–10	Quarter-final	(Italy) Torres Sassari	0–1	3–0 ^{f}	3–1
2009–10	Semi-final	(Sweden) Umeå	0–0	3–2 ^{f}	3–2
2009–10	Final	(Germany) Turbine Potsdam	0–0 (a.e.t.) (6–7 p) ( (Spain) Getafe)		
2010–11	Round of 32	(Netherlands) AZ	2–1 ^{f}	8–0	10–1
2010–11	Round of 16	(Russia) Rossiyanka Khimki	6–1 ^{f}	5–0	11–1
2010–11	Quarter-final	(Russia) Zvezda Perm	0–0 ^{f}	1–0	1–0
2010–11	Semi-final	(England) Arsenal	3–2	2–0 ^{f}	5–2
2010–11	Final	(Germany) Turbine Potsdam	2–0 ( (England) London)		
2011–12	Round of 32	(Romania) Olimpia Cluj-Napoca	9–0 ^{f}	3–0	12–0
2011–12	Round of 16	(Czech Republic) Sparta Prague	6–0 ^{f}	6–0	12–0
2011–12	Quarter-final	(Denmark) Brøndby	4–0	4–0 ^{f}	8–0
2011–12	Semi-final	(Germany) Turbine Potsdam	0–0	5–1 ^{f}	5–1
2011–12	Final	(Germany) Frankfurt	2–0 ( (Germany) Munich)		
2012–13	Round of 32	(Finland) Vantaa	7–0 ^{f}	5–0	12–0
2012–13	Round of 16	(Russia) Zorky Krasnogorsk	9–0 ^{f}	2–0	11–0
2012–13	Quarter-final	(Sweden) Rosengård Malmö	3–0	5–0 ^{f}	8–0
2012–13	Semi-final	(France) Juvisy	6–1	3–0 ^{f}	9–1
2012–13	Final	(Germany) VfL Wolfsburg	0–1 ( (England) London)		
2013–14	Round of 32	(Netherlands) Twente Enschede	4–0 ^{f}	6–0	10–0
2013–14	Round of 16	(Germany) Turbine Potsdam	1–0 ^{f}	1–2	2–2 (a)
2014–15	Round of 32	(Italy) Brescia	5–0 ^{f}	9–0	14–0
2014–15	Round of 16	(France) Paris Saint-Germain	1–1 ^{f}	0–1	1–2
2015–16	Round of 32	(Poland) Medyk Konin	6–0 ^{f}	3–0	9–0
2015–16	Round of 16	(Spain) Atlético Madrid	3–1 ^{f}	6–0	9–1
2015–16	Quarter-final	(Czech Republic) Slavia Prague	0–0	9–1 ^{f}	9–1
2015–16	Semi-final	(France) Paris Saint-Germain	1–0	7–0 ^{f}	8–0
2015–16	Final	(Germany) VfL Wolfsburg	1–1 (a.e.t.) (4–3 p) ( (Italy) Reggio Emilia)		
2016–17	Round of 32	(Norway) Avaldsnes	5–2 ^{f}	5–0	10–2
2016–17	Round of 16	(Switzerland) Zürich	9–0	8–0 ^{f}	17–0
2016–17	Quarter-final	(Germany) VfL Wolfsburg	2–0 ^{f}	0–1	2–1
2016–17	Semi-final	(England) Manchester City	3–1 ^{f}	0–1	3–2
2016–17	Final	(France) Paris Saint-Germain	0–0 (a.e.t.) (7–6 p) ( (Wales) Cardiff)		
2017–18	Round of 32	(Poland) Medyk Konin	5–0 ^{f}	9–0	14–0
2017–18	Round of 16	(Kazakhstan) Kazygurt Shymkent	7–0 ^{f}	9–0	16–0
2017–18	Quarter-final	(Spain) Barcelona	1–0	2–1 ^{f}	3–1
2017–18	Semi-final	(England) Manchester City	0–0 ^{f}	1–0	1–0
2017–18	Final	(Germany) VfL Wolfsburg	4–1 (a.e.t.) ( (Ukraine) Kyiv)		
2018–19	Round of 32	(Norway) Avaldsnes	2–0 ^{f}	5–0	7–0
2018–19	Round of 16	(Netherlands) Ajax Amsterdam	4–0 ^{f}	9–0	13–0
2018–19	Quarter-final	(Germany) VfL Wolfsburg	4–2	2–1 ^{f}	6–3
2018–19	Semi-final	(England) Chelsea	1–1	2–1 ^{f}	3–2
2018–19	Final	(Spain) Barcelona	4–1 ( (Hungary) Budapest)		
2019–20	Round of 32	(Russia) Ryazan-VDV	9–0 ^{f}	7–0	16–0
2019–20	Round of 16	(Denmark) Fortuna Hjørring	4–0 ^{f}	7–0	11–0
2019–20	Quarter-final	(Germany) Bayern Munich	2–1 ( (Spain) Bilbao)		
2019–20	Semi-final	(France) Paris Saint-Germain	1–0 ( (Spain) Bilbao)		
2019–20	Final	(Germany) VfL Wolfsburg	3–1 ( (Spain) San Sebastián)		
2020–21	Round of 32	(Italy) Juventus	3–2 ^{f}	3–0	6–2
2020–21	Round of 16	(Denmark) Brøndby	3–1	2–0 ^{f}	5–1
2020–21	Quarter-final	(France) Paris Saint-Germain	1–0 ^{f}	1–2	2–2 (a)
2021–22	Round 2	(Spain) Levante	2–1 ^{f}	2–1	4–2
2021–22	Group D	(Germany) Bayern Munich	0–1	2–1	1st
2021–22	Group D	(Portugal) Benfica	5–0	5–0	1st
2021–22	Group D	(Sweden) BK Häcken	3–0	4–0	1st
2021–22	Quarter-final	(Italy) Juventus	1–2 ^{f}	3–1	4–3
2021–22	Semi-final	(France) Paris Saint-Germain	2–1	3–2 ^{f}	5–3
2021–22	Final	(Spain) Barcelona	3–1 ( (Italy) Turin)		
2022–23	Group C	(England) Arsenal	1–0	1–5	2nd
2022–23	Group C	(Italy) Juventus	1–1	0–0	2nd
2022–23	Group C	(Switzerland) Zürich	3–0	4–0	2nd
2022–23	Quarter-final	(England) Chelsea	2–1 (a.e.t.)	0–1 ^{f}	2–2 (3–4 p)
2023–24	Group B	(Czech Republic) Slavia Prague	9–0	2–2	1st
2023–24	Group B	(Austria) St. Pölten	7–0	2–0	1st
2023–24	Group B	(Norway) Brann	2–2	3–1	1st
2023–24	Quarter-final	(Portugal) Benfica	2–1 ^{f}	4–1	6–2
2023–24	Semi-final	(France) Paris Saint-Germain	2–1	3–2 ^{f}	5–3
2023–24	Final	(Spain) Barcelona	0–2 ( (Spain) Bilbao)		
2024–25	Group A	(Turkey) Galatasaray	3–0	6–0	1st
2024–25	Group A	(Germany) VfL Wolfsburg	1–0	2–0	1st
2024–25	Group A	(Italy) AS Roma	4–1	3–0	1st
2024–25	Quarter-final	(Germany) Bayern Munich	4–1	2–0^{f}	6–1
2024–25	Semi-final	(England) Arsenal	1–4	2–1^{f}	3–5
2025–26	League phase	(England) Arsenal	—N/a	2–1	2nd
2025–26	League phase	(Austria) SKN St. Pölten	3–0	—N/a	2nd
2025–26	League phase	(Germany) VfL Wolfsburg	3–1	—N/a	2nd
2025–26	League phase	(Italy) Juventus	—N/a	3–3	2nd
2025–26	League phase	(England) Manchester United	—N/a	3–0	2nd
2025–26	League phase	(Spain) Atlético Madrid	4–0	—N/a	2nd
2025–26	Quarter-final	(Germany) VfL Wolfsburg	0–1^{f}	4–0	4–1
2025–26	Semi-final	(England) Arsenal	1–2^{f}	3–1	4–3
2025–26	Final	(Spain) Barcelona	0–4 ( (Norway) Oslo)		
2026–27	League phase	(Switzerland) Servette Chênois	—N/a	8–0	
2026–27	League phase	(England) Chelsea	0–0	—N/a	
2026–27	League phase	(Italy) Inter Milan	6–0	—N/a	
2026–27	League phase	(Italy) Juventus	—N/a	6–0	
2026–27	League phase	(England) Arsenal	—N/a		
2026–27	League phase	(Sweden) BK Häcken		—N/a	

^{f} First leg.

== List of seasons ==
Top scorers in bold were also the top scorers in the Division 1 Féminine that season.

Champions	Runners-up	Promoted	Relegated

Season	League										Cup	Europe		Top goalscorer(s)	
Season	Division	Pos	Pld	W	D	L	GF	GA	GD	Pts	Cup	Europe		Name(s)	Goals
2001–02	D1	3rd	22	14	2	6	53	26	+27	66	RU			(France) Séverine Creuzet-Laplantes	17
2002–03	D1	2nd	22	15	4	3	60	19	+41	71	**W**			(France) **Sandrine Brétigny**	26
2003–04	D1	2nd	22	14	4	4	52	25	+27	68	**W**			(France) **Claire Morel**	18
2004–05	D1	3rd	22	15	2	5	50	20	+30	69	RU			(France) Séverine Creuzet-Laplantes	13
2005–06	D1	3rd	22	10	8	4	34	12	+22	60	RU			(France) Sandrine Brétigny	11
2006–07	D1	**1st**	22	20	1	1	116	9	+107	83	RU			(France) **Sandrine Brétigny**	42
2007–08	D1	**1st**	22	18	4	0	93	4	+89	80	**W**	Women's Cup	SF	(France) Sandrine Brétigny	25
2008–09	D1	**1st**	22	21	1	0	114	11	+103	86	SF	Women's Cup	SF	(Brazil) **Kátia**	27
2009–10	D1	**1st**	22	18	2	2	93	11	+82	78	SF	Champions League	RU	(Brazil) Kátia	17
2010–11	D1	**1st**	22	22	0	0	106	6	+100	88	QF	Champions League	**W**	(France) Sandrine Brétigny	19
2011–12	D1	**1st**	22	19	3	0	119	3	+116	82	**W**	Champions League	**W**	(France) **Eugénie Le Sommer**	22
2012–13	D1	**1st**	22	22	0	0	132	5	+127	88	**W**	Champions League	RU	(Sweden) **Lotta Schelin**	24
2013–14	D1	**1st**	22	21	0	1	95	12	+83	85	**W**	Champions League	R16	(France) Eugénie Le Sommer (France) Laëtitia Tonazzi	15
2014–15	D1	**1st**	22	22	0	0	147	6	+141	88	**W**	Champions League	R16	(Sweden) **Lotta Schelin**	34
2015–16	D1	**1st**	22	19	3	0	115	4	+111	82	**W**	Champions League	**W**	(Norway) **Ada Hegerberg**	33
2016–17	D1	**1st**	22	21	0	1	103	6	+97	63	**W**	Champions League	**W**	(Norway) **Ada Hegerberg** (France) **Eugénie Le Sommer**	20
2017–18	D1	**1st**	22	21	1	0	104	5	+99	64	RU	Champions League	**W**	(Norway) **Ada Hegerberg**	31
2018–19	D1	**1st**	22	20	2	0	89	9	+83	62	**W**	Champions League	**W**	(Norway) **Ada Hegerberg**	20
2019–20	D1	**1st**	16	14	2	0	67	4	+63	44	**W**	Champions League	**W**	(Norway) **Ada Hegerberg**	14
2020–21	D1	2nd	22	20	1	1	78	6	+72	61	DNF	Champions League	QF	(England) **Nikita Parris**	13
2021–22	D1	**1st**	22	21	1	0	79	8	+71	64	R16	Champions League	**W**	(United States) **Catarina Macario**	14
2022–23	D1	**1st**	22	20	1	1	69	9	+60	61	**W**	Champions League	QF	(Denmark) **Signe Bruun**	8
2023–24	D1	**1st**	22	20	1	1	82	13	+69	61	**W**	Champions League	RU	(Norway) **Ada Hegerberg**	12
2024–25	D1	**1st**	22	20	2	0	99	8	+91	62	R32	Champions League	SF	(Haiti) Melchie Dumornay	17
