= 2023–24 Division 1 Féminine =

50th season of top French women's football league

Division 1 Féminine
- Season: 2023–24
- Dates: 15 September 2023 – 17 May 2024
- Champions: Lyon (17th title)
- Relegated: Lille; Bordeaux
- Champions League: Lyon; Paris Saint-Germain; Paris FC
- Matches: 132
- Goals: 469 (3.55 per match)
- Top goalscorer: Tabitha Chawinga (18 goals)
- Biggest home win: Paris Saint-Germain 8–1 Bordeaux (20 January 2024)
- Biggest away win: Lille 0–7 Lyon (23 March 2024)
- Highest scoring: Paris Saint-Germain 8–1 Bordeaux (20 January 2024)
- Longest winning run: Lyon (14 matches)
- Longest unbeaten run: Lyon (21 matches)
- Longest winless run: Lille (16 matches)
- Longest losing run: Lille (6 matches)
- Highest attendance: 21,764; Lyon 1–1 Paris Saint-Germain (11 February 2024)
- Lowest attendance: 50; Reims 1–0 Guingamp (20 January 2024)
- Total attendance: 141,963
- Average attendance: 1,075

The 2023–24 Division 1 Féminine season, also known as D1 Arkema for sponsorship reasons, was the 50th edition of Division 1 Féminine since its establishment in 1974. The season began on 15 September 2023 and ended on 17 May 2024. Lyon were the defending champions, having won their record-extending sixteenth league title in 2022–23 season.

For the first time since 2004, playoffs were played after the regular season. It was contested between the four clubs with the most points after the regular season. On 17 May 2024, Lyon defeated Paris Saint-Germain in the playoff final to win their record-extending 17th title.

== Teams ==
Location of teams in 2023–24 Division 1 Féminine

A total of 12 teams compete in the league.

Team	Manager	Ground	Capacity	2022–23 season
Bordeaux	Patrice Lair	Stade Sainte-Germaine, Le Bouscat	7,000	7th
Dijon	Christophe Forest	Stade Gaston Gérard, Dijon	498	10th
Fleury	Fabrice Abriel	Stade Auguste Gentelet, Fleury-Mérogis	1,000	4th
Guingamp	Frédéric Biancalani	Stade de l'Akademi EA Guingamp, Pabu	1,960	9th
Le Havre	Romain Djoubri	Stade Océane, Le Havre	25,178	8th
Lille	Rachel Saidi	Stadium Lille Métropole, Lille	18,154	D2F Group A, 1st (promoted)
Lyon	Sonia Bompastor	Groupama OL Training Center, Décines-Charpieu	1,524	1st
Montpellier	Yannick Chandioux	Stade Bernard Gasset - Mama Ouattara Field, Montpellier	1,280	5th
Paris FC	Sandrine Soubeyrand	Stade Robert Bobin, Bondoufle	18,845	3rd
Paris Saint-Germain	Jocelyn Prêcheur	Stade Municipal Georges Lefèvre, Saint-Germain-en-Laye	2,164	2nd
Reims	Amandine Miquel	Stade Louis Blériot, Bétheny	500	6th
Saint-Étienne	Laurent Mortel	Stade Salif Keïta, Saint-Étienne	1,000	D2F Group B, 1st (promoted)

== Regular season ==
=== League table ===
Pos	Team	Pld	W	D	L	GF	GA	GD	Pts	Qualification or relegation
1	Lyon (C)	22	20	1	1	82	13	+69	61	Qualification for playoffs
2	Paris Saint-Germain	22	15	5	2	67	17	+50	50	Qualification for playoffs
3	Paris FC	22	13	3	6	56	27	+29	42	Qualification for playoffs
4	Reims	22	10	5	7	33	31	+2	35	Qualification for playoffs
5	Fleury	22	10	3	9	37	33	+4	33	
6	Montpellier	22	9	5	8	33	36	−3	32	
7	Saint-Étienne	22	9	2	11	31	52	−21	29	
8	Dijon	22	6	5	11	26	47	−21	23	
9	Le Havre	22	5	8	9	33	49	−16	23	
10	Guingamp	22	4	4	14	26	49	−23	16	
11	Bordeaux (R)	22	3	4	15	17	49	−32	13	Relegation to Division 2 Féminine
12	Lille (R)	22	2	7	13	27	65	−38	13	Relegation to Division 2 Féminine

Source: Division 1 Féminine
Rules for classification: 1) points; 2) head-to-head points; 3) head-to-head goal difference; 4) goal difference; 5) goals scored
(C) Champions; (R) Relegated

=== Results ===
Home \ Away	BOR	DIJ	FLE	GUI	LHV	LSC	LYO	MON	PFC	PSG	REI	SET
Bordeaux	—	0–2	0–3	1–1	1–1	3–0	2–1	1–1	2–6	0–3	0–2	1–4
Dijon	1–0	—	0–5	2–0	1–2	3–3	1–3	1–0	0–6	2–5	1–1	3–2
Fleury	2–1	2–1	—	3–1	2–2	2–2	1–3	2–3	2–1	1–1	1–0	2–1
Guingamp	1–0	1–1	3–1	—	3–4	4–3	1–5	0–1	0–4	3–3	0–0	3–4
Le Havre	1–1	3–3	1–3	2–0	—	2–2	0–4	3–3	1–4	1–1	0–2	4–2
Lille	1–2	2–2	2–1	0–2	3–3	—	0–7	0–0	0–4	0–4	2–5	1–2
Lyon	4–0	4–1	4–0	2–1	3–0	5–0	—	5–0	1–0	1–1	4–1	6–0
Montpellier	2–1	2–0	1–1	3–1	2–1	1–2	1–2	—	1–4	1–3	2–1	4–0
Paris FC	1–0	0–1	3–1	2–0	3–2	3–2	1–6	3–0	—	1–2	2–2	0–1
Paris Saint-Germain	8–1	3–0	2–1	5–0	4–0	6–0	0–1	4–1	1–1	—	4–0	5–0
Reims	3–0	1–0	2–0	1–0	0–0	3–1	1–5	0–3	1–1	2–1	—	2–0
Saint-Étienne	1–0	2–0	1–0	2–1	1–2	1–1	1–6	1–1	1–6	0–1	4–3	—

Source: fff.fr
Legend: Blue = home team win; Yellow = draw; Red = away team win.

== Playoffs ==
Playoffs included four matches. The first match was played between the team with the most points during the regular season and the team which finished fourth. The second match was played between the clubs which finished second and third during the regular season. The winners of both matches qualified for the 2024–25 UEFA Women's Champions League and faced each other in a final match to determine the league champions, who qualify directly to the group stage while the runner-up enter the final qualifying round. A third place playoff was also played between the other two clubs to determine the third club for the Champions League, entering in round 1.

Semi-finals
1	Lyon	6
4	Reims	0
2	Paris Saint-Germain (p)	2 (5)
3	Paris FC	2 (4)

Final
Lyon	2
Paris Saint-Germain	1
Third place playoff
Paris FC (p)	1 (4)
Reims	1 (2)

=== Semi-finals ===
11 May 2024
21:00 CEST

Paris Saint-Germain	2–2	Paris FC
Geyoro 52' (pen.); Katoto 72'	Report	Matéo 36'; Corboz 56'
Penalties
Karchaoui (penalty scored); Katoto (penalty scored); Baltimore (penalty scored); Martens (penalty scored); Geyoro (penalty scored)	5–4	(penalty scored) Gréboval; (penalty missed) Bourdieu; (penalty scored) Thiney; (penalty scored) Le Mouël; (penalty scored) Sissoko

Parc des Princes, Paris
Attendance: 5,971
Referee: Audrey Gerbel
12 May 2024
17:00 CEST

Lyon	6–0	Reims
Renard 12'; Van de Donk 36'; Majri 42'; Diani 57', 67'; Dumornay 58'	Report

Parc Olympique Lyonnais, Décines-Charpieu
Attendance: 11,110
Referee: Clémence Gonçalves

=== Third place playoff ===
17 May 2024
18:00 CEST

Paris FC	1–1	Reims
Matéo 83'	Report	Corboz 87' (pen.)
Penalties
Greboval (penalty scored); Hocine (penalty scored); Thiney (penalty scored); Ribadeira (penalty scored)	4–2	(penalty missed) Corboz; (penalty scored) Gomes; (penalty scored) Pasquereau; (penalty missed) Ngock

Stade Sébastien Charléty, Paris
Attendance: 1,552
Referee: Victoria Beyer

=== Final ===
17 May 2024
21:00 CEST

Lyon	2–1	Paris Saint-Germain
Cascarino 18'; Diani 22'	Report	Chawinga 73'

Parc Olympique Lyonnais, Décines-Charpieu
Attendance: 15,660
Referee: Maika Vanderstichel

== Season statistics ==
=== Top scorers ===
As of 8 May 2024

Rank	Player	Club	Goals
1	(Malawi) Tabitha Chawinga	Paris Saint-Germain	18
2	(Norway) Ada Hegerberg	Lyon	12
3	(France) Grace Geyoro	Paris Saint-Germain	11
3	(France) Marie-Antoinette Katoto	Paris Saint-Germain	11
5	(France) Eugénie Le Sommer	Lyon	10
6	(France) Noémie Mouchon	Reims	9
6	(France) Faustine Robert	Montpellier	9
6	(France) Gaëtane Thiney	Paris FC	9
9	(France) Inès Benyahia	Le Havre	8
9	(Germany) Sara Däbritz	Lyon	8
9	(Poland) Ewelina Kamczyk	Fleury	8
9	(France) Clara Matéo	Paris FC	8
9	(France) Louna Ribadeira	Paris FC	8

=== Most clean sheets ===
As of 8 May 2024

Rank	Player	Club	Clean sheets
1	(Poland) Kinga Szemik	Reims	9
2	(Chile) Christiane Endler	Lyon	8
2	(France) Constance Picaud	Paris Saint-Germain	8
4	(Nigeria) Chiamaka Nnadozie	Paris FC	6
5	(France) Maryne Gignoux-Soulier	Saint-Étienne	4
5	(Belgium) Lisa Lichtfus	Dijon	4
7	(France) Marie Petiteau	Montpellier	3
8	(Germany) Laura Benkarth	Lyon	2
8	(France) Manon Heil	Fleury	2
8	(United States) Cosette Morché	Montpellier	2
8	(France) Laëtitia Philippe	Le Havre	2
8	(France) Marie-Morgane Sieber	Guingamp	2

=== Hat-tricks ===
Player	Club	Against	Result	Date
(France) Louise Fleury	Paris FC	Le Havre	4–1 (A)	6 October 2023
(United States) Lindsey Horan	Lyon	Saint-Étienne	6–0 (H)	14 October 2023
(France) Louise Fleury	Paris FC	Saint-Étienne	6–1 (A)	11 November 2023
(Malawi) Tabitha Chawinga	Paris Saint-Germain	Dijon	5–2 (A)	12 November 2023
(France) Clara Matéo	Paris FC	Bordeaux	6–2 (A)	10 February 2024
(France) Louna Ribadeira	Paris FC	Le Havre	3–2 (H)	6 March 2024
(France) Amel Majri	Lyon	Lille	7–0 (A)	23 March 2024
(France) Vicki Bècho	Lyon	Saint-Étienne	6–1 (A)	14 April 2024

== Awards ==
=== Player of the Month ===
Month	Winner	Club	Ref.
September 2023	(France) Eugénie Le Sommer	Lyon	
October 2023	(Haiti) Melchie Dumornay	Lyon	
November 2023	(France) Inès Benyahia	Le Havre	
December 2023	(Netherlands) Damaris Egurrola	Lyon	
January 2024	(Norway) Ada Hegerberg	Lyon	
February 2024	(Malawi) Tabitha Chawinga	Paris Saint-Germain	
March 2024	(Malawi) Tabitha Chawinga	Paris Saint-Germain	
April 2024	(France) Noémie Mouchon	Reims	

=== UNFP Awards ===
Nominations were announced on 30 April 2024. Winners along with the Team of the Year were announced on 13 May.

Note: Winners are displayed in boldface.

==== Player of the Year ====
Player	Club
(Malawi) **Tabitha Chawinga**	**Paris Saint-Germain**
(France) Grace Geyoro	Paris Saint-Germain
(Norway) Ada Hegerberg	Lyon
(United States) Lindsey Horan	Lyon
(France) Sakina Karchaoui	Paris Saint-Germain

==== Young Player of the Year ====
Player	Club
(United States) Korbin Albert	Paris Saint-Germain
(France) Vicki Bècho	Lyon
(Haiti) Melchie Dumornay	Lyon
(France) **Louna Ribadeira**	**Paris FC**
(France) Thiniba Samoura	Paris Saint-Germain

==== Goalkeeper of the Year ====
Player	Club
(Chile) Christiane Endler	Lyon
(Poland) Katarzyna Kiedrzynek	Paris Saint-Germain
(Algeria) Chloé N'Gazi	Fleury
(Nigeria) **Chiamaka Nnadozie**	**Paris FC**
(Poland) Kinga Szemik	Reims

==== Team of the Year ====
Position	Player	Club
GK	(Nigeria) Chiamaka Nnadozie	Paris FC
DF	(Australia) Ellie Carpenter	Lyon
DF	(France) Griedge Mbock Bathy	Lyon
DF	(France) Élisa De Almeida	Paris Saint-Germain
DF	(France) Sakina Karchaoui	Paris Saint-Germain
MF	(France) Grace Geyoro	Paris Saint-Germain
MF	(France) Inès Benyahia	Le Havre
MF	(United States) Lindsey Horan	Lyon
FW	(France) Delphine Cascarino	Lyon
FW	(France) Eugénie Le Sommer	Lyon
FW	(Malawi) Tabitha Chawinga	Paris Saint-Germain

=== FFF D1 Arkema Awards ===
Nominations were announced on 22 April 2024. Winners along with the Team of the Season were announced on 29 April.

Note: Winners are displayed in boldface.

==== Best Player ====
Player	Club
(Malawi) **Tabitha Chawinga**	**Paris Saint-Germain**
(France) Grace Geyoro	Paris Saint-Germain
(United States) Lindsey Horan	Lyon

==== Best Young Player ====
Player	Club
(France) **Inès Benyahia**	**Le Havre**
(France) Louna Ribadeira	Paris FC
(France) Thiniba Samoura	Paris Saint-Germain

==== Best Goalkeeper ====
Player	Club
(Chile) Christiane Endler	Lyon
(Poland) Katarzyna Kiedrzynek	Paris Saint-Germain
(Nigeria) **Chiamaka Nnadozie**	**Paris FC**

==== Best Manager ====
Manager	Club
(France) **Sonia Bompastor**	**Lyon**
(France) Jocelyn Prêcheur	Paris Saint-Germain
(France) Sandrine Soubeyrand	Paris FC

==== Goal of the Season ====
Player	Club
(France) **Eugénie Le Sommer**	**Lyon**
(Haiti) Kethna Louis	Montpellier
(France) Julie Machart	Lille

==== Team of the Season ====
Position	Player	Club
GK	(Nigeria) Chiamaka Nnadozie	Paris FC
DF	(Australia) Ellie Carpenter	Lyon
DF	(France) Griedge Mbock Bathy	Lyon
DF	(France) Élisa De Almeida	Paris Saint-Germain
DF	(France) Sakina Karchaoui	Paris Saint-Germain
MF	(France) Grace Geyoro	Paris Saint-Germain
MF	(Netherlands) Damaris Egurrola	Lyon
MF	(United States) Lindsey Horan	Lyon
FW	(France) Inès Benyahia	Le Havre
FW	(France) Eugénie Le Sommer	Lyon
FW	(Malawi) Tabitha Chawinga	Paris Saint-Germain

== Attendances ==
#	Football club	Average attendance
1	Olympique lyonnais	2,737
2	PSG	1,966
3	Paris FC	1,261
4	Havre AC	1,172
5	Girondins de Bordeaux	953
6	LOSC	920
7	EA Guingamp	816
8	Dijon FCO	721
9	FC Fleury 91	695
10	Saint-Étienne	660
11	Stade de Reims	621
12	MHSC	426
