= Inès Benyahia =

French footballer (born 2003)

Personal information
- Date of birth: 26 March 2003 (age 23)
- Place of birth: Sète, France
- Height: 1.75 m (5 ft 9 in)
- Position: Attacking midfielder

Team information
- Current team: Lyon
- Number: 10

Youth career
- 2009–2010: AS Fabrègues
- 2010–2018: Montpellier
- 2018–2022: Lyon

Senior career*
Years	Team	Apps	(Gls)
2021–	Lyon	43	(8)
2023–2024	→ Le Havre (loan)	21	(8)

International career^{‡}
2019	France U16	3	(3)
2020	France U17	1	(0)
2022	France U19	5	(1)
2021–2022	France U20	2	(1)
2022–	France U23	14	(3)
Medal record
Women's football
Representing France
UEFA Women's Nations League
Third place	2025
- * Club domestic league appearances and goals as of 14 November 2026 ‡ National team caps and goals as of 27 November 2025

Inès Benyahia (born 26 March 2003) is a French professional footballer who plays as an attacking midfielder for Première Ligue club Lyon.

== Honours ==
Lyon

- Première Ligue: 2021–22, 2022–23, 2024–25, 2025–26
- Coupe de France Féminine: 2022–23, 2025–26
- Coupe LFFP: 2025–26
- Trophée des Championnes: 2022
- UEFA Women's Champions League: 2021–22

Individual

- LFFP Première Ligue best young player: 2023–24
- LFFP Première Ligue team of the season: 2023–24
- UNFP Division 1 Féminine team of the year: 2023–24
- Première Ligue Player of the Month: November 2023
