= List of foreign Première Ligue players =

The Première Ligue is the highest league of women's football in France. The following players must meet both of the following two criteria:

1. Have played at least one Première Ligue game. Players who were signed by Première Ligue clubs, but only played in lower leagues, cup games and/or European games, or did not play in any competitive games at all, are not included.

Clubs listed are those for which the player has played at least one Première Ligue game.

In bold: players who are currently under contract by a Première Ligue club.

== Africa (CAF) ==
=== Algeria ===
- Melissa Bethi – Nantes – 2026
- Léa Abadou – Guingamp – 2014–2019
- Laetitia Agab-Cluzel – Saint Etienne – 2009–2011
- Lydia Belkacemi – Le Mans, Soyaux – 2010–2017
- **Morgane Belkhiter** – Nimes, Le Havre, Saint Etienne, Metz, Albi, Soyaux – 2015–
- Yasmina Benabid – Saint-Memmie, Charleville – 2005
- Myriam Benlazar – Toulouse, Albi, Rodez – 2012–2018
- Sarah Boudaoud – Issy – 2014–2022
- Lilia Boumrar – Vendenheim – 2011–2012
- Inès Boutaleb – Lyon, Marseille, Metz – 2015–
- Lina Chabane – Fleury – 2020–
- Inès Chasseloup De Laubat – OGC Nice – 2021
- Imane Chebel – Brest, Fleury – 2021–2023
- **Marine Dafeur** – Guingamp, Fleury, Lille – 2014–
- Anissa Dellidj – Lille – 2017–
- **Sofia Guellati** – Guingamp – 2024–
- Ghoutia Karchouni – PSG, Bordeaux – 2013–2021
- Sylia Koui – Yzeure Allier, Le Havre – 2010–2021
- **Laura Muller** – Le Havre – 2022–
- **Chloé N'Gazi** – Le Havre, Fleury, Marseille, PSG, Orleans, Issy – 2011–
- Amira Ould Braham – Juvisy, Nantes – 2015–
- Sabah Rguila – Issy – 2012–2013
- Samira Tebbi – Nimes – 2015–

=== Benin ===
- Aude Gbedjissi – Lens – 2025–2026

=== Cameroon ===
- Nina Ngueleu – Montpellier – 2026
- Michaela Abam – Paris – 2018–2019
- Claudine Meffometou – Guingamp, Fleury – 2017–
- Charlène Meyong – Reims – 2022–2024
- Marlyse Ngo Ndoumbouk – Metz, Tours, Nancy, Lille – 2013–2021
- Jeannette Yango – Yzeure, Guingamp, Fleury – 2013-2023-
- Henriette Akaba – Soyaux – 2021
- Aurelle Awona – Soyaux, Dijon, Reims – 2011–
- Francine Zouga – Montpellier – 2014–2015
- Yvonne Leuko – Nantes, Montigny, Arras, Strasbourg, Albi – 2009
- Monique Ngock – Fleury – 2026

=== Congo ===
- Chardente Saya Ndoulou – Arras – 2013–2014

=== Djibouti ===
- Isabelle Lommelais – Angers, La Roche-sur-Yon, Corné, Rhone Crussol, Valence – 2000–2013

=== DR Congo ===
- **Merveille Kanjinga** – **PSG** – 2025–
- Gloria Mabomba – Reims – 2016–2017
- Éva Sumo – Soyaux, Yzeure, Bordeaux, Marseille, Le Havre, Nantes – 2011–2014, 2016–2017, 2019–2020, 2022–2025

=== Gabon ===
- Flore Essone – AS Montigny-le-Bretonneux – 2010
- Patricia Mbazogho – Limoges FC, ASJ Soyaux, US Orleans, Yzeure Allier – 2015–

=== Ghana ===
- Abi Kim – Nantes, Bordeaux – 2023–2024
- Bénédicte Simon – Reims, Paris Saint-Germain – 2019–2021, 2022–2023
- Mariam Toloba – Nantes – 2026

=== Ivory Coast ===
- **Mariam Diakité** – Fleury – 2022–2024
- **Stéphanie Gbogou** – Soyaux – 2022–2023
- **Inès Konan** – Fleury – 2022–
- **Rosemonde Kouassi** – Fleury – 2022–2024

=== Kenya ===
- **Lilian Awuor** – Soyaux – 2022–2023

=== Madagascar ===
- Juliette Merle – Guingamp – 2018–2020

=== Malawi ===
- **Tabitha Chawinga** – Lyon, PSG – 2023–2024
- **Rose Kadzere** – Montpellier – 2024–2025

=== Mali ===
- Djeneba Bamba – AS Saint Etienne – 2006–2008
- Aïssata Coulibaly – Saint Etienne – 2006–2007
- Kadidia Diawara – Strasbourg Alsace, FC Vendenheim – 2006–
- Maïmouna Konaré – Saint Etienne – 2007
- Aminata Sissoko – Montpellier – 2003
- **Aissata Traoré** – Fleury, Guingamp – 2019–

=== Morocco ===
- Hajar Said – Paris – 2026
- Dounia Akhazroun – Hem, Leers, Gravelines, Henin-Beaumont, Arras, Lille – 2005–
- Salma Amani – Issy, Fleury, Guingamp, Dijon, Saint-Malo – 2011–2023
- Khadija Ben Haddou – US Compiegne – 2005–
- Kenza Chapelle – Strasbourg, Fleury – 2020–
- **Sana Daoudi** – PSG, Guingamp – 2016–
- Nesryne El Chad – Saint Etienne, Lille – 2021–
- **Sarah Kassi** – Fleury – 2021–
- **Anissa Lahmari** – PSG, Paris, Soyaux, Guingamp – 2015–2023
- Élodie Nakkach – Soyaux, Dijon, La-Roche-sur-Yon – 2011–2021
- **Jade Nassi** – Reims – 2023–
- Nawëal Ouinekh – Bordeaux – 2016–

=== Nigeria ===
- Chinaza Uchendu – Nantes – 2025
- Rofiat Imuran – Reims – 2022–2024
- Chiamaka Nnadozie – Paris FC – 2020–
- Jennifer Echegini – PSG – 2024–
- Evelyn Nwabuoku – EA Guingamp – 2016
- Desire Oparanozie – Dijon, Guingamp – 2014–2022
- Cynthia Uwak – Olympique Lyonnais – 2008–2009
- Onyinyechi Zogg – ASJ Soyaux – 2021–2022
- Joy Bokiri – Saint Etienne – 2022–2023

=== Senegal ===
- Fatoumata Baldé – Guingamp, Dijon, La-Roche-sur-Yon, Strasbourg – 2013–
- Binta Diakhaté – Metz – 2016–2017
- Mareme Yally – Metz – 2016–2017

=== South Africa ===
- Noxolo Cesane – Reims – 2022
- Ode Fulutudilu – Fleury – 2022–2023

=== Tunisia ===
- **Ella Kaabachi** – Rodez, PSG, Issy, Soyaux, Rouen – 2008–2023
- Leïla Maknoun – Rouen, Guingamp, Issy, Paris, PSG – 2011–2022
- Salma Zemzem – GPSO 92 Issy – 2020–2021

=== Uganda ===
- Shadia Nankya – Le Havre – 2026

== Asia (AFC) ==
=== Australia ===
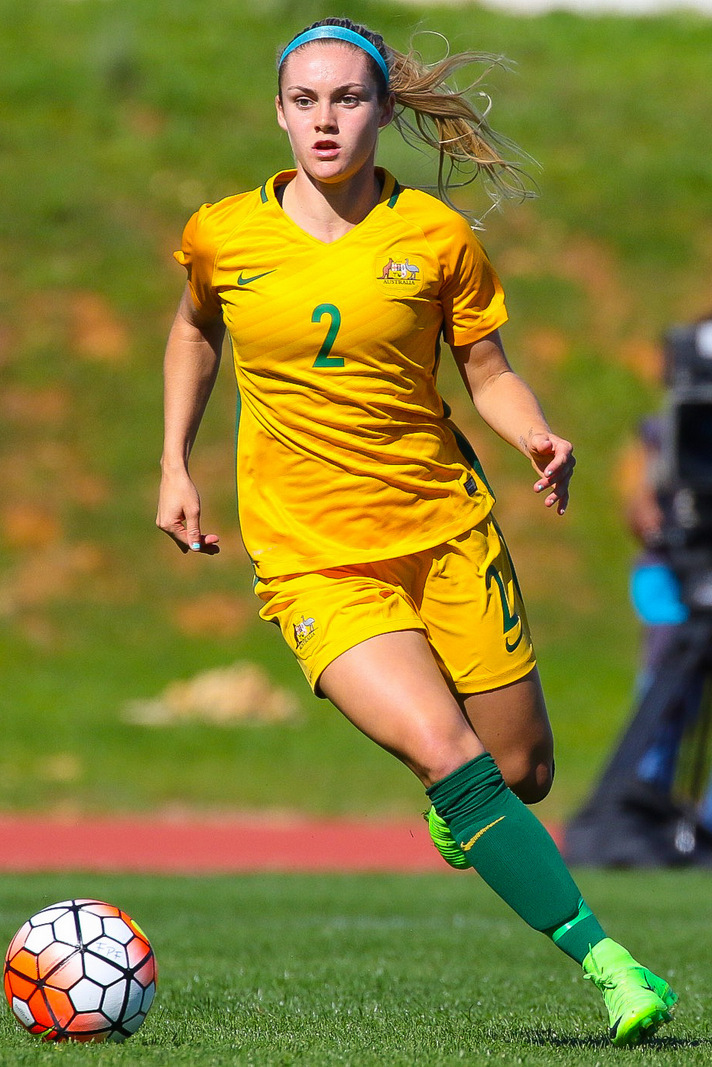
Ellie Carpenter

- Laura Brock – Guingamp – 2020–2021
- Ellie Carpenter – Lyon – 2020–2025
- Emma Checker – FC Fleury 91 – 2020
- Mary Fowler – Montpellier – 2020–2022
- **Clara Hoarau** – **Fleury** – 2026–
- Clare Hunt – PSG – 2023–2024
- Sarah Hunter – Paris FC – 2023–2025
- **Teagan Micah** – **Lyon** – 2025–
- Annalise Rasmussen – Toulouse – 2026–
- Kyah Simon – Dijon – 2025–2026
- Lydia Williams – PSG – 2022

=== China ===
- Wu Chengshu – Dijon FCO – 2023–
- Wang Fei – Olympique Lyonnais – 2015
- Li Mengwen – PSG – 2022–2023
- Wurigumula – Montpellier – 2026

=== Nepal ===
- Sabitra Bhandari – Guingamp – 2024–

=== Chinese Taipei ===
- Lin Man-ting – Albi – 2015–2016
- Tseng Shu-o – Saint Etienne, Albi – 2012–2020

=== Japan ===
- Saki Kumagai – Lyon – 2013–2021
- Shinobu Ohno – Lyon – 2013
- Ami Otaki – Guingamp, Paris – 2014–2017
- Rumi Utsugi – Montpellier – 2010–2016

=== Lebanon ===
- Pilar Khoury – Nantes, Albi, Grenoble, Saint-Etienne, Strasbourg – 2016

=== Thailand ===
- **Janista Jinantuya** – Soyaux – 2022–2023

== Europe (UEFA) ==
=== Armenia ===
- Lara Kazandjian – Lens – 2025

=== Austria ===
- Viktoria Pinther – Dijon – 2024–
- Sarah Puntigam – Montpellier – 2018–2022
- Marina Georgieva – PSG – 2022–2023

=== Belgium ===
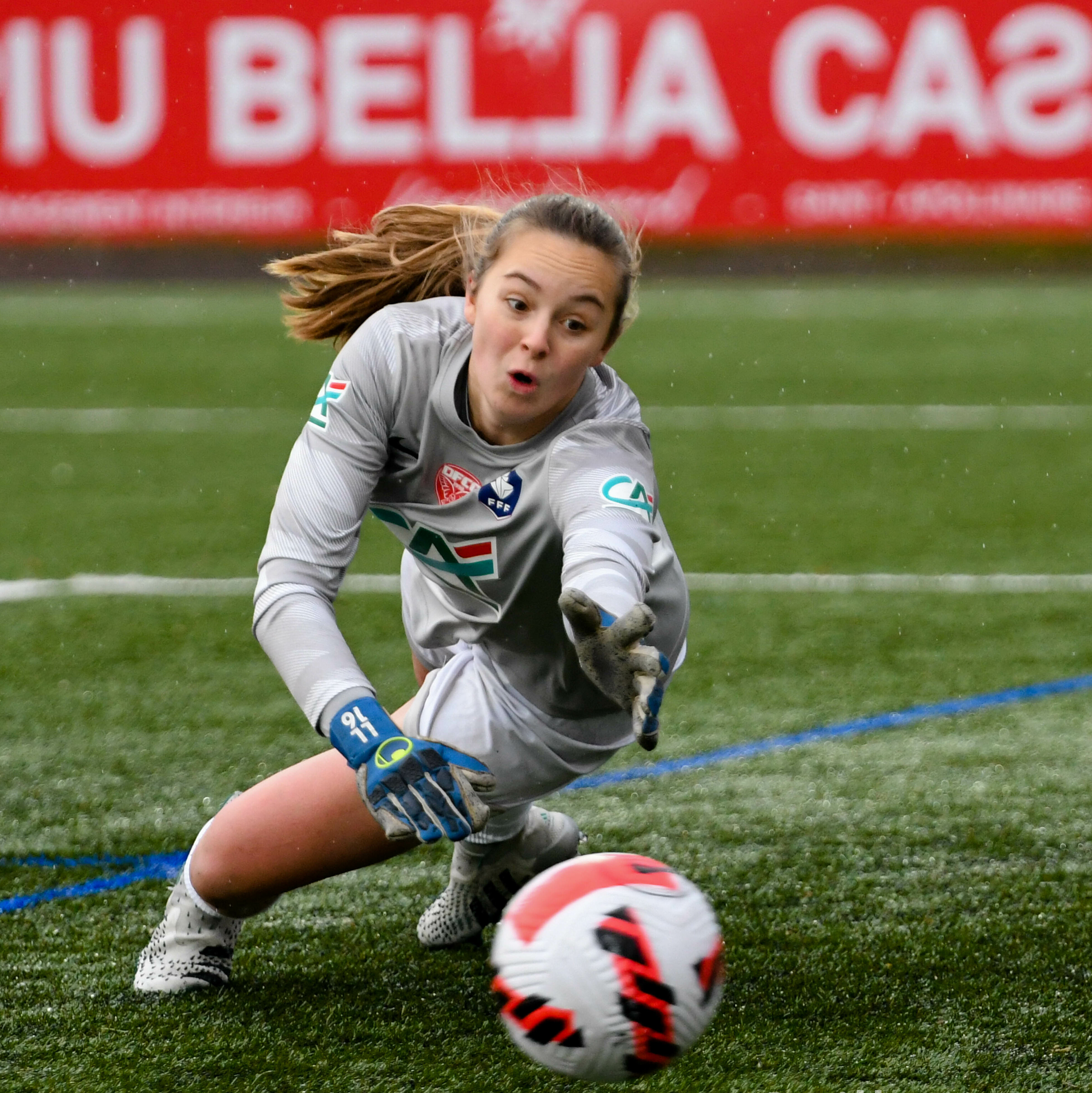
Lisa Lichtfus

- Janice Cayman – Juvisy, Montpellier, Lyon – 2012–2023
- Jana Coryn – Lille – 2017–2018
- Maud Coutereels – Lille – 2017–2019
- Silke Demeyere – Lille, Le Havre – 2017–2019, 2022–2026
- Welma Fon – Saint Etienne – 2025
- Lisa Lichtfus – Dijon, Le Havre – 2022–2026
- Aurélie Reynders – Paris – 2026–
- **Mariam Toloba** – Nantes, **Paris** – 2025–
- Davinia Vanmechelen – PSG – 2018
- Sara Yuceil – Marseille – 2016–2017

=== Bosnia and Herzegovina ===
- Ema Paljevic – Nantes – 2025–

=== Bulgaria ===
- Catherine Karadjov – Juvisy – 2016

=== Croatia ===
- Iva Landeka (née Lazeta) – Montpellier – 2019–2022

=== Czech Republic ===
- Barbora Votíková – PSG – 2021–2023
- Antonie Starova – Guingamp – 2023–2024

=== Denmark ===
- Amalie Vangsgaard – PSG – 2023–2024
- Katrine Veje – Montpellier – 2017–2018
- Nadia Nadim – PSG – 2019–2021
- Luna Gevitz – Montpellier, Guingamp – 2019–2023
- Dorte Dalum Jensen – Lyon – 2008–2009
- Line Røddik Hansen – Lyon – 2016
- Cecilie Sandvej – Fleury, Dijon – 2019–2024
- Malou Marcetto Rylov – Dijon – 2023–2024
- Sarah Jankovska – Dijon – 2023–2025
- Mille Gejl – Montpellier HSC – 2024
- Rikke Sevecke – Fleury – 2019–2020
- Sarah Sundahl – Fleury – 2026
- Emilie Byrnak – Strabourg – 2026

=== England ===
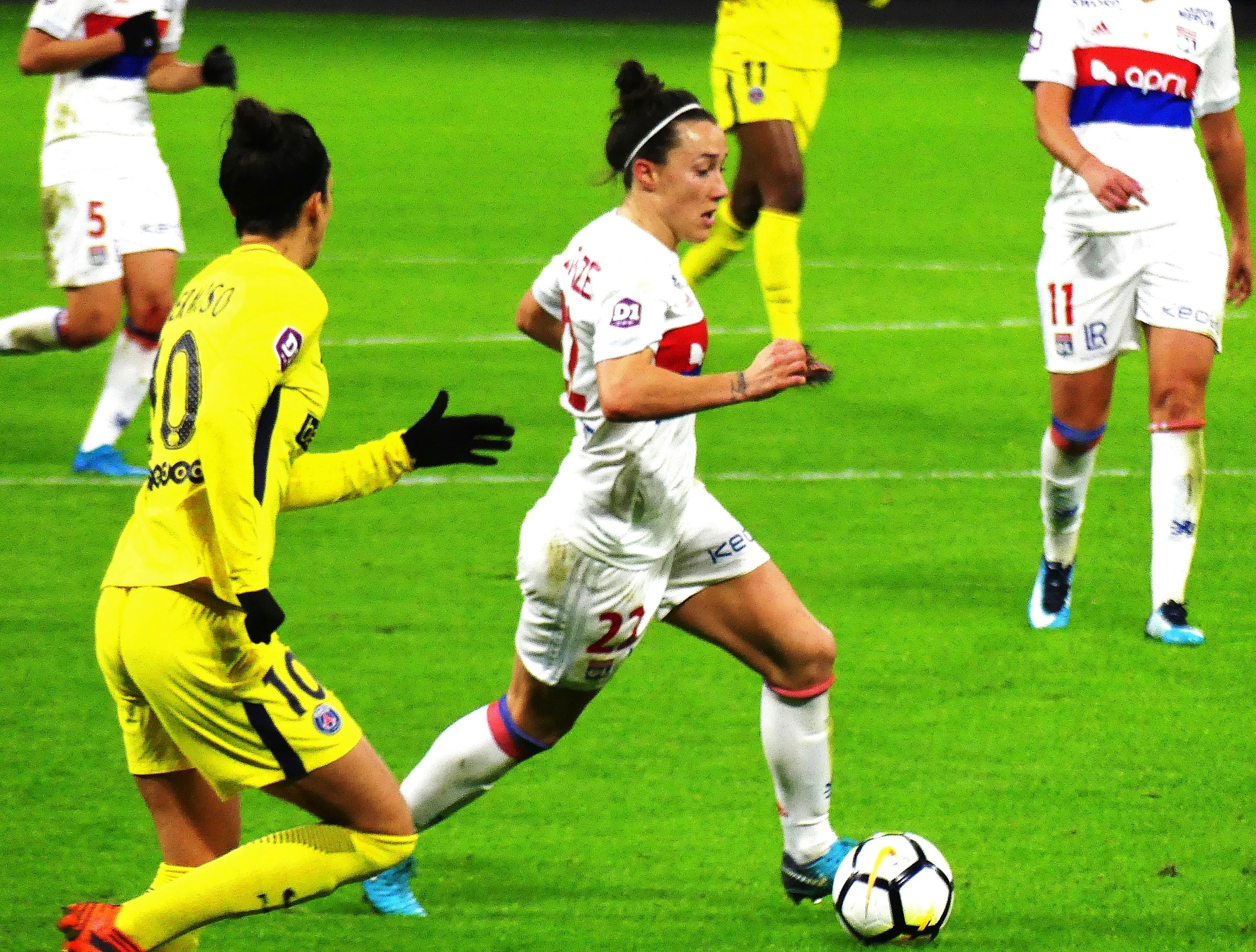
Lucy Bronze

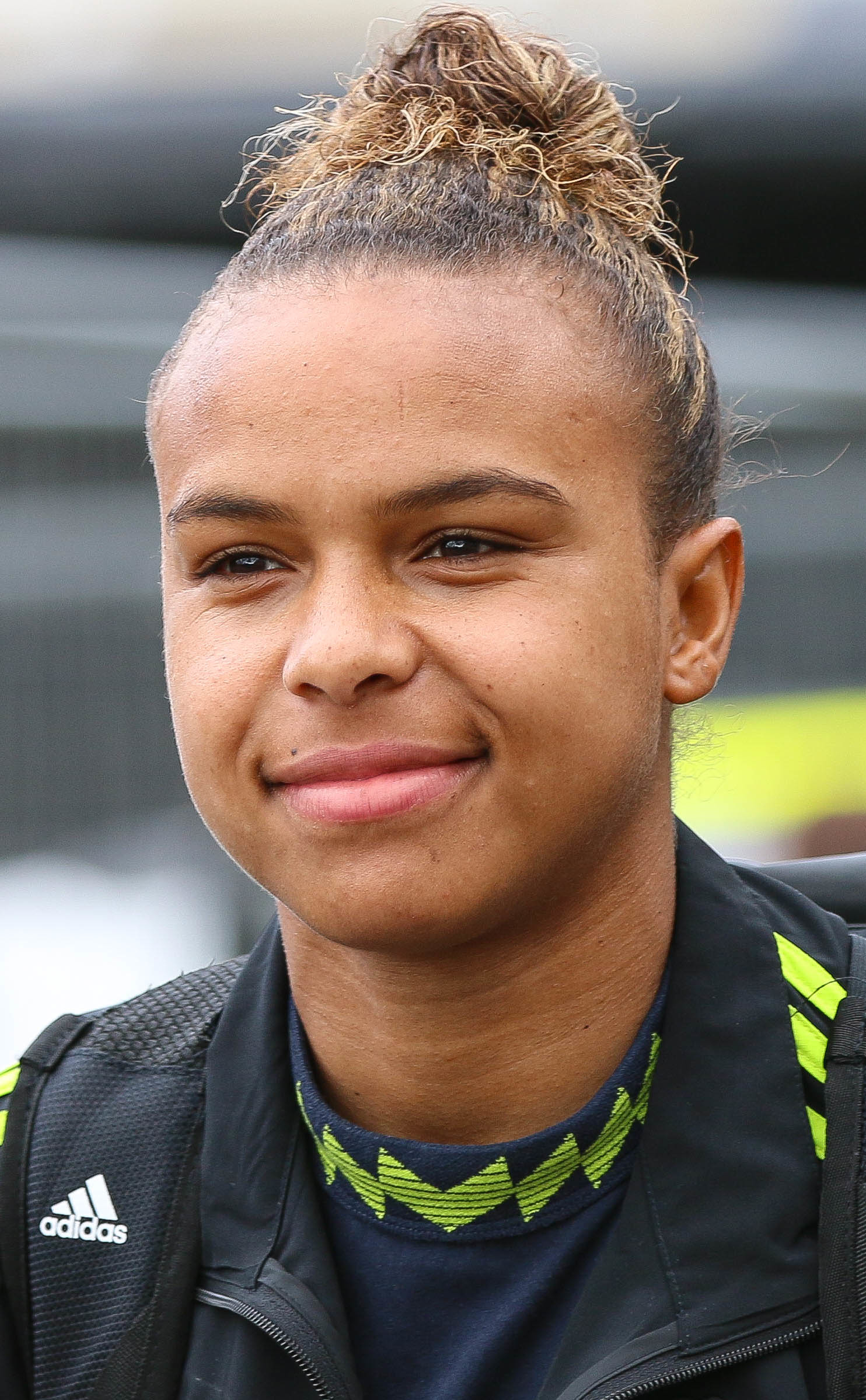
Nikita Parris

- Grace Gillard – Montpellier – 2026
- Tinaya Alexander – Montpellier – 2022–2023
- Lucy Bronze – Lyon – 2017–2020
- Izzy Christiansen – Lyon – 2018–2019
- Jenna Dear – Dijon, Fleury – 2019–2023
- Mary Earps – PSG – 2024–
- Kess Elmore – Saint-Etienne – 2023–2024
- Alex Greenwood – Lyon – 2019–2020
- Shameeka Fishley – Bordeaux – 2023
- Anna Moorhouse – Bordeaux – 2020–2022
- Nikita Parris – Lyon – 2019–2021
- Grace Rapp – Reims – 2019–2022
- Jodie Taylor – Lyon – 2020–2021

=== Estonia ===
- Getter Laar – Guingamp, Metz – 2013–2018

=== Finland ===
- Aada Torronen – Guingamp – 2024–
- Katriina Talaslahti – Le Havre, FC Fleury 91, Dijon – 2021–
- Linda Sallstrom – Paris – 2018–2021
- Adelina Engman – Montpellier HSC – 2020–2021
- Emmi Siren – Dijon – 2025

=== Germany ===
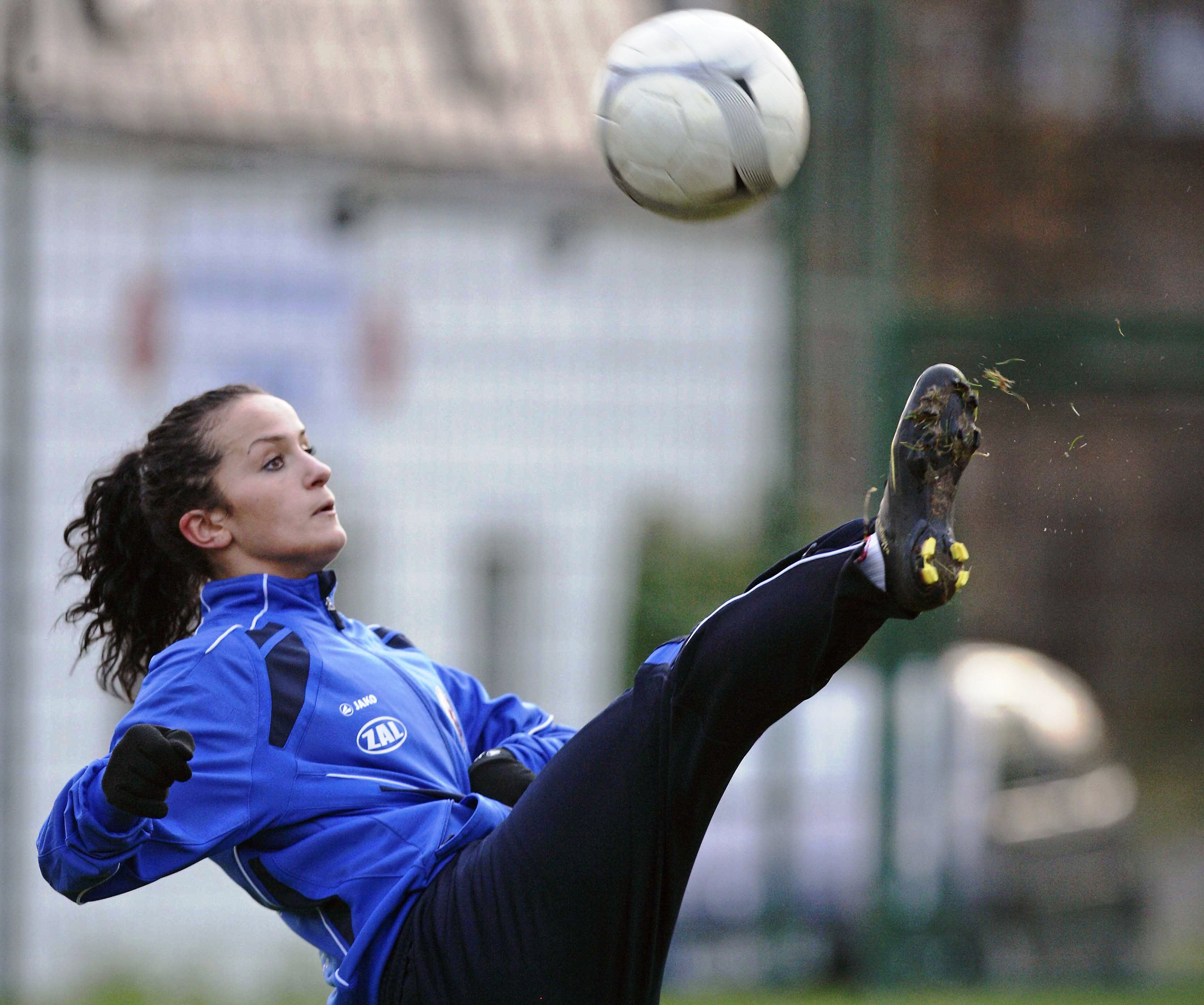
Fatmire Alushi

- Fatmire Alushi (née Bajramaj) – PSG – 2014–2016
- Kristin Kögel – Strasbourg – 2026–
- Maria Luisa Grohs – Lyon – 2026–
- Luisa Guttenberger – Strasbourg – 2026–
- Marith Prießen (née Muller-Prießen) – Paris FC – 2019–2020
- Lisa Schmitz – Montpellier – 2019–2023
- Lena Petermann – Montpellier – 2019–2023
- Linda Bresonik – PSG – 2012–2015
- Pauline Bremer – Lyon – 2015–2017
- Sara Däbritz – PSG, Lyon – 2019–2025
- Josephine Henning – PSG, Lyon – 2014–2017
- Dzsenifer Marozsán – Lyon – 2016–2025
- Claire Savin – Paris FC – 2019–2021
- Carolin Simon – Lyon – 2018–2019
- Anja Mittag – PSG – 2015–2016
- Annike Krahn – PSG – 2012–2015
- Laura Benkarth – Lyon – 2023–2025
- Victoria Krug – Nantes – 2026–

=== Hungary ===
- Katalin Bökk – US Compiegne – 2003
- Erzsébet Milassin – US Compiegne – 2003–
- Ildiko Szabo – US Compiegne, Tremblay FC – 2001

=== Iceland ===
- Sara Björk Gunnarsdóttir – Lyon – 2020–2022
- Berglind Björg Þorvaldsdóttir – Le Havre, PSG – 2020–
- Fanndís Friðriksdóttir – Marseille – 2017–2018
- Svava Ros Gudmundsdottir – FC Girondins de Bordeaux – 2020–2022

=== Israel ===
- Agam Haviv – FC Girondins de Bordeaux – 2023–
- **Eden Avital** – Soyaux – 2021–2023

=== Italy ===
- Erin Ceasrini - Fluery - 2026-
- Elena Linari – Bordeaux – 2020–2021
- Sara Gama – PSG – 2013–2015
- Rose Reilly – Reims – 1973–1975
- Giorgia Spinelli – Reims – 2019–2020
- Arianna Criscione – Saint-Etienne, Saint-Malo, PSG – 2015–2021
- Margot Shore – Marseille – 2025–

=== Lithuania ===
- Liucija Vaitukaityte – Nantes – 2026

=== Montenegro ===
- Jelena Karličić – Bordeaux – 2022–

=== Netherlands ===
- Mieke Roelfsema – Nantes – 2026
- Lieke Martens – PSG – 2022–
- Corina Luijks – Soyaux – 2021–2022
- **Damaris Egurrola** – Lyon – 2024–
- Anouk Dekker – Montpellier – 2016–2021
- Daniëlle van de Donk – Lyon – 2021–2025
- Sisca Folkertsma – Bordeaux – 2021–2023
- Loes Geurts – PSG – 2016–2017
- Jackie Groenen – PSG – 2022–
- Shanice van de Sanden – Lyon – 2017–2020
- Katja Snoeijs – FC Girondins de Bordeaux – 2020–2022
- Romee Leuchter – PSG – 2026–
- Zoi van de Ven – Nantes – 2026

=== North Macedonia ===
- Nataša Andonova – PSG – 2017

=== Norway ===
- Nora Haheim – Paris – 2025
- Anja Sonstevold – Fleury – 2020
- Ada Hegerberg – Lyon – 2014–
- Isabell Herlovsen – Lyon – 2009–2010
- Christine Colombo Nilsen – Lyon – 2009–2010
- Bente Nordby – Lyon – 2008–2009
- Andrea Norheim — Lyon – 2016–2018
- Karina Sævik – PSG – 2019–2020
- Ingvild Stensland – Lyon – 2009–2011
- Celin Bizet – PSG – 2021–2022
- Frøya Dorsin – PSG – 2024–
- Elida Kolbjørnsen – Lyon – 2026
- Johanna Rytting Kaneryd – Lyon – 2026

=== Poland ===
- Natalia Wrobel – Strabourg – 2026
- Kayla Adamek – Reims – 2024–25
- **Paulina Dudek** – **Paris Saint-Germain** – 2018–
- Dominika Grabowska – Fleury – 2020–24
- **Małgorzata Grec** – **Dijon** – 2022–
- **Klaudia Jedlińska** – **Dijon** – 2023–
- **Ewelina Kamczyk** – **Fleury** – 2021–
- Nikola Karczewska – Fleury – 2021–22
- **Katarzyna Kiedrzynek** – **Paris Saint-Germain** – 2013–20, 2023–
- Kinga Szemik – Reims – 2022–24
- **Oliwia Szperkowska** – **Paris Saint-Germain** – 2023–
- Wiktoria Zieniewicz – Fleury – 2024–
- Natalia Radkiewicz – Nantes – 2026

=== Portugal ===
- Beatriz Fonsca – Marsille – 2026
- Kelsey Araújo – Le Havre – 2021–2023
- **Mélissa Gomes** – Juvisy, Saint-Maur, **Reims**, Bordeaux
- **Morgane Martins** – Saint-Étienne, Issy, **Dijon** – 2016–17, 2021–
- **Serena Queirós** – **Bordeaux**
- Nelly Rodrigues – Marseille, PSG, Nantes – 2022–
- Jéssica Silva – Lyon – 2019–2021
- Héléna Theriez – Paris – 2021–
- Mariane Amaro – PSG – 2011–2013
- Jassie Vasconcelos – Metz – 2019–2020

=== Republic of Ireland ===
- Kyra Carusa – Le Havre – 2019
- Niamh Fahey – Bordeaux – 2017–2018
- Chloe Mustaki – Bordeaux – 2016–2017
- Anne O'Brien – Reims – 1973–1975
- Fiona O'Sullivan – Soyaux – 2011–2012
- Stephanie Roche (née Zambra) – Albi – 2014
- Amber Barrett – Alsace – 2026–

=== Romania ===
- Anne-Marie Banuta – Rodez, Saint-Etienne, Nantes, Metz, Toulouse – 2007–
- Daniela Gurz – Metz, FC Rouen – 2014–2017

=== Russia ===
- Irina Grigorieva – Lyon – 1993
- Ekaterina Tyryshkina – Rodez, Guingamp, Le Havre, Dijon – 2017–

=== Scotland ===
- Jen Beattie – Montpellier – 2013–2015
- Christy Grimshaw – Metz – 2019–2020
- Edna Neillis – Reims – 1973–1975
- Caroline Weir – Lyon – 2026

=== Serbia ===
- Dejana Stefanovic – Albi – 2017–2018
- Milica Mijatovic – Albi – 2017–2018
- Kristina Pantelić – Albi, Saint-Etienne, FC Vendenheim – 2015–
- Alexsandra Gajic - Fluery - 2026-

=== Slovakia ===
- **Dominika Škorvánková** – Montpellier – 2020–2023

=== Slovenia ===
- Kaja Korosec – Paris – 2023–
- Manja Rogan – Nantes – 2025–

=== Spain ===
- Marta Carro – Marseille – 2025–
- María Díaz Cirauqui – Fleury, Dijon – 2021–2024
- Irene Paredes – PSG – 2016–2021
- Veronica Boquete – PSG – 2016–2018
- Patricia Martinez – Albi – 2015–2018
- Jennifer Hermoso – PSG – 2017–2018
- Andrea Rocio – Nantes – 2024–
- Virginia Torrecilla – Montpellier – 2015–2019
- Elba Verges – Soyaux – 2017–2018
- Clara Creus Fabregat – GPSO 92 Issy – 2020–2021
- Izarne Sarasola – Nantes – 2026

=== Sweden ===
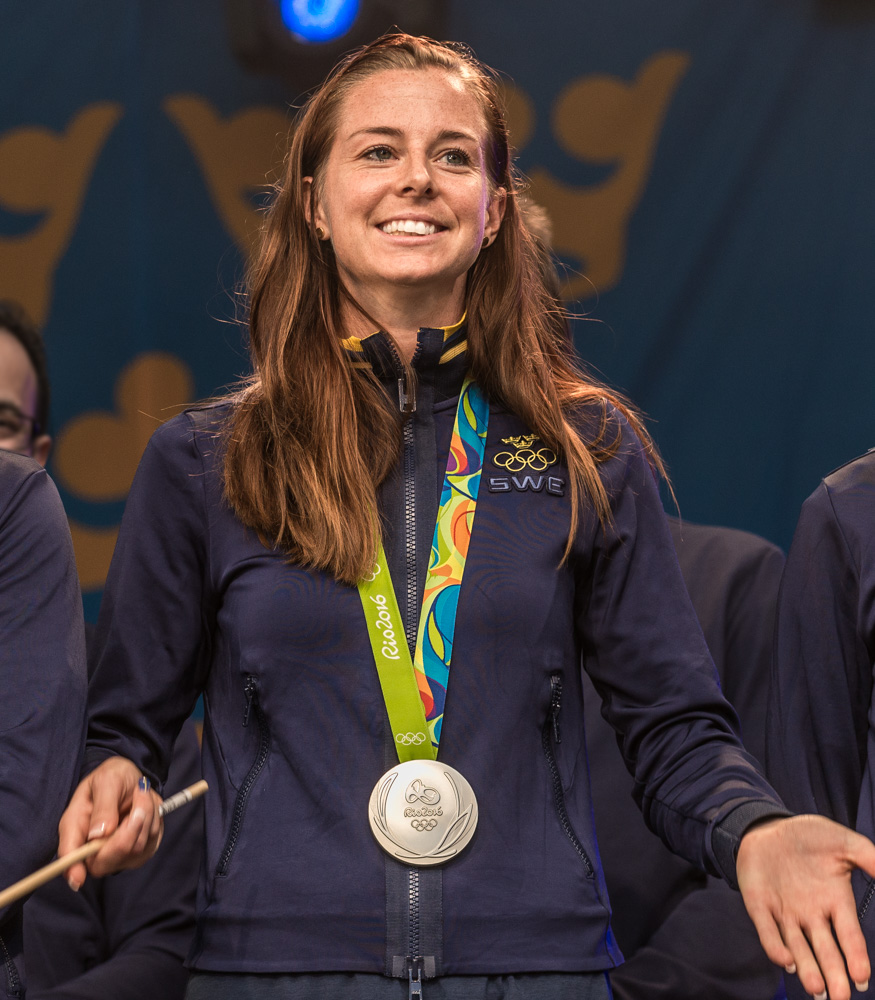
Lotta Schelin

- Maria Karlsson – AS Saint Etienne – 2015–2016
- Kosovare Asllani – PSG – 2012–2016
- Stina Blackstenius – Montpellier – 2017–2019
- Emma Holmgren – Lyon – 2021–2023
- Amanda Ilestedt – PSG – 2019–2021
- Amelie Rybäck – Lyon – 2010
- Lotta Schelin – Lyon – 2008–2016
- Caroline Seger – Lyon, PSG – 2014–2017
- Marija Banusic – Montpellier – 2019–2021
- Sofia Jakobsson – Montpellier – 2014–2019
- Michelle de Jongh – FC Fleury – 2021
- Elma Junttila Nelhage – Lyon – 2026

=== Switzerland ===
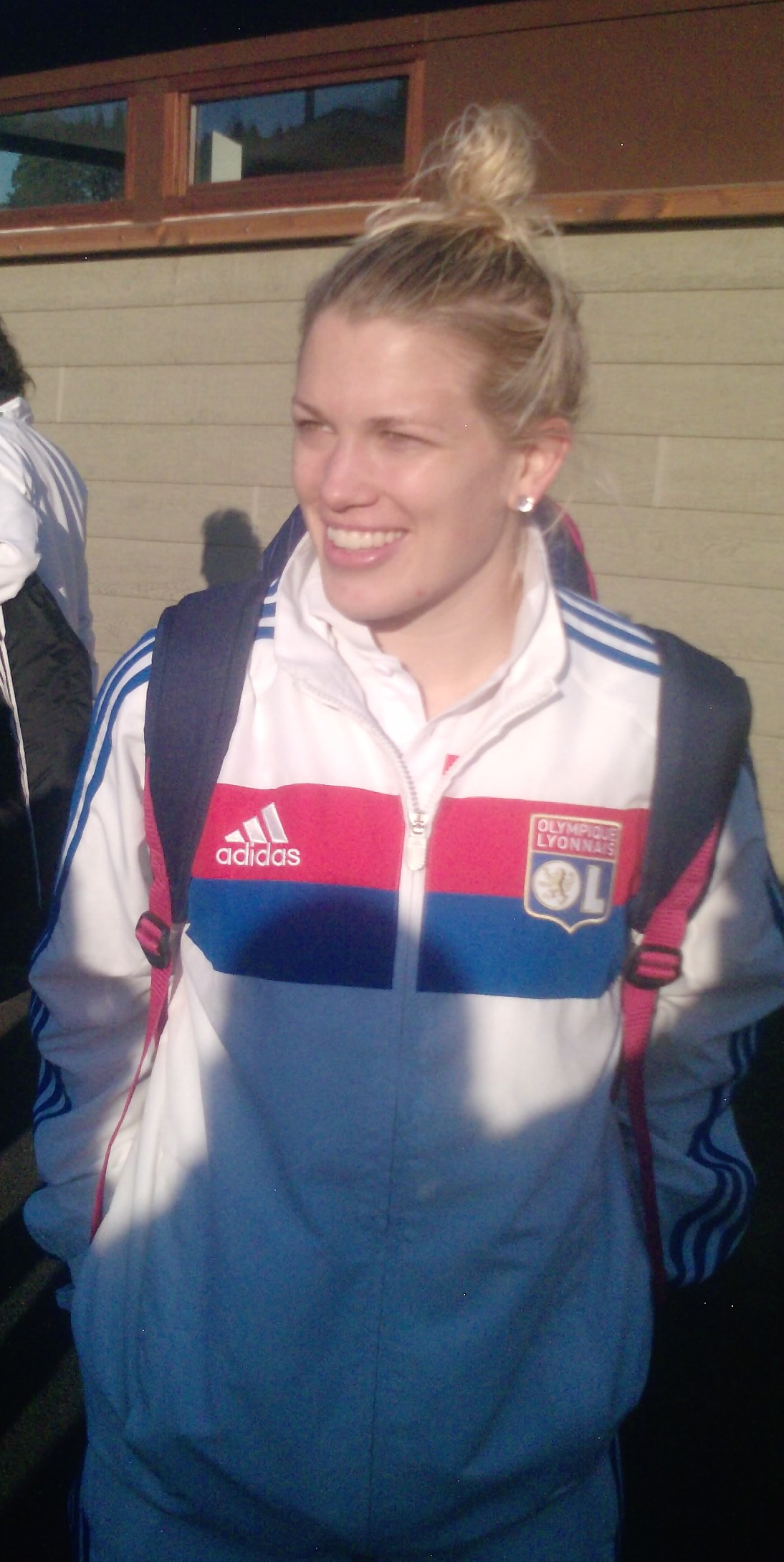
Lara Dickenmann

- Naomie Poitier – PSG – 2026
- Viola Calligaris – PSG – 2023–2024
- Nina Stapelfeldt – ASJ Soyaux – 2020–2021
- Thais Hurni – Saint-Etienne – 2023–2024
- Eseosa Aigbogun – Paris – 2018–2023
- Ramona Bachmann – PSG – 2020–2024
- Lara Dickenmann – Lyon – 2009–2015
- Sally Julini – Lyon, Guingamp – 2020–
- Coumba Sow – Paris – 2019–2023
- Meriame Terchoun – Dijon – 2022–
- Leila Wandeler – Lyon – 2023–2024
- Camille Surdez – FC Girondins de Bordeaux – 2018–2020
- Ana-Maria Crnogorevic – Strasbourg – 2026–

=== Turkey ===
- Selen Altunkulak – Metz, Marseille, Rodez, Toulouse, FC Vendenheim – 2013–
- **İpek Kaya** – Soyaux, Metz – 2015–
- Melike Pekel – Metz, PSG, Reims, Bordeaux, Le Havre – 2017–2021
- Laila Dali-Storti – Guingamp, Yzeure Allier, Marseille, Dijon, Saint Etienne, Montpellier, Nantes – 2009–

=== Ukraine ===
- Tetyana Romanenko – Saint-Etienne – 2022–
- Darya Kravets – Reims – 2019–2021
- Inna Hlushchenko – Lille – 2024–
- Kateryna Boklach – Nantes – 2026

=== Wales ===
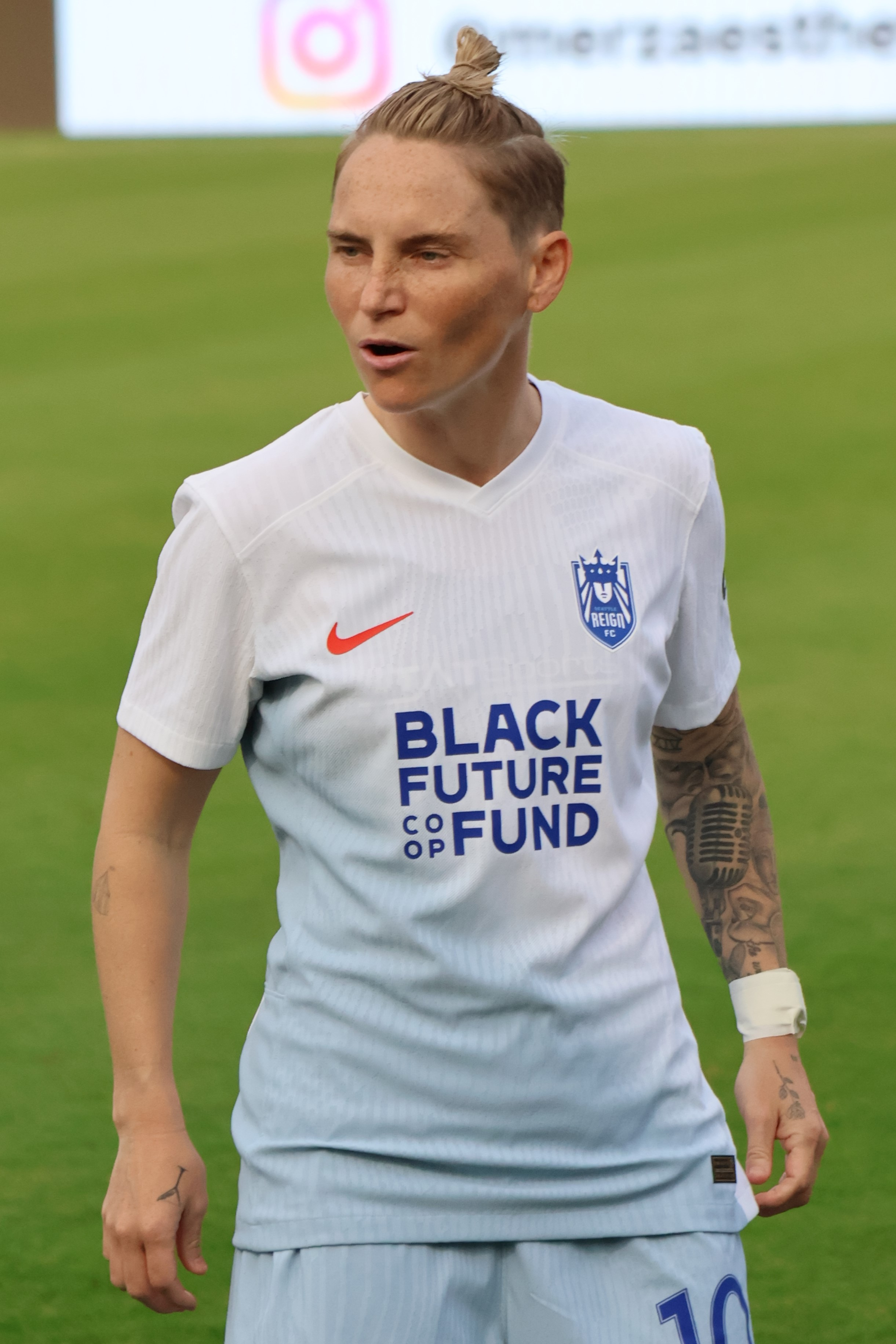
Jess Fishlock

- Jess Fishlock – Lyon – 2018–2019

== North, Central America and Caribbean (CONCACAF) ==
=== Bahamas ===
- Miracle Porter – Reims – 2022

=== Canada ===
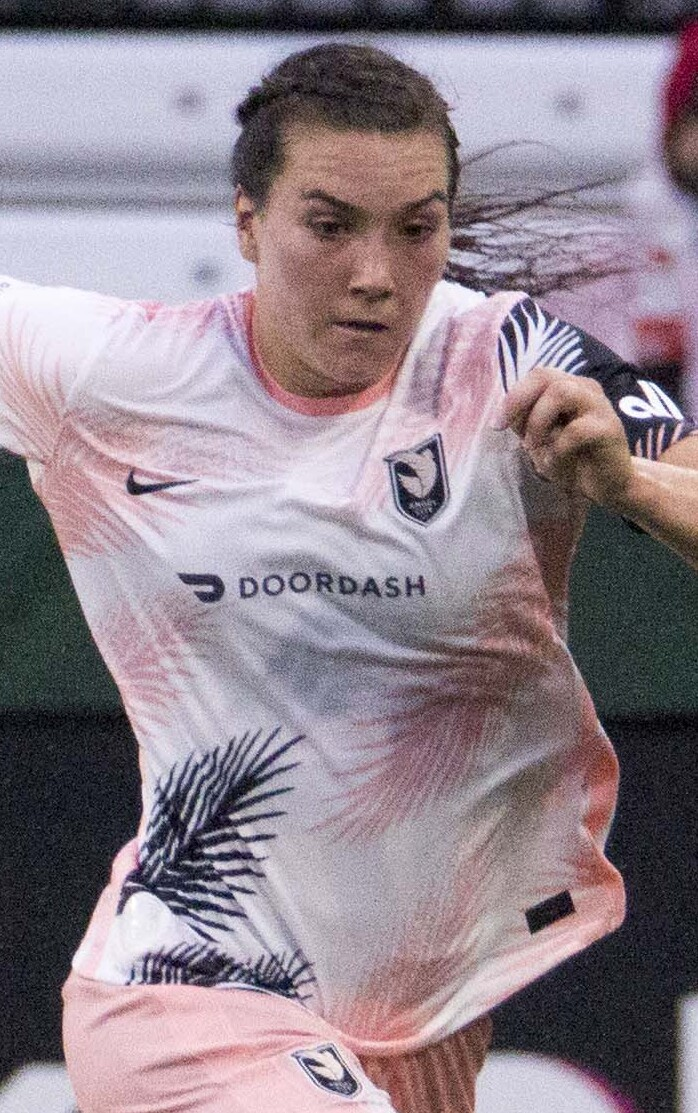
Vanessa Gilles

- Latifah Abdu – Soyaux, Dijon, Guingamp – 2020, 2023–2024
- Marie-Yasmine Alidou – Marseille – 2017–2018
- **Emily Burns** – Saint-Etienne, Nantes, Dijon, **Marseille** – 2021–2022, 2024–
- Zoe Burns – Fleury – 2025
- Courtney Conrad – Issy – 2014–2015
- Paige Culver – Soyaux, Bordeaux – 2020–2021
- Vanessa Gilles – Bordeaux, Lyon – 2018–2025
- Jenna Hellstrom – Dijon – 2022–2023
- Jordyn Huitema – PSG – 2019–2022
- Nikolina Istocki – Saint-Étienne – 2025–2026
- **Florianne Jourde** – **PSG** – 2025–
- Stephanie Labbé – PSG – 2021
- Alex Lamontagne – Fleury, Rodez, Saint-Etienne – 2018–2019, 2022–2026
- **Ashley Lawrence** – PSG, **Lyon** – 2017–2023, 2025–
- Marie Levasseur – Metz, Fleury, Montpellier – 2020–2026
- Asma Merzougui – Lens – 2026
- Quinn – Paris – 2019
- Geneviève Richard – Olympique Marseille – 2017–2018
- Danielle Rotheram – Metz – 2016–2017
- Mélissa Roy – Fleury – 2018–2019
- Wanda Rozwadowska – Soyaux – 2004–2005
- Valérie Sanderson – Metz – 2018–2019
- Sadie Sider-Echenberg – Le Havre – 2023
- Sarah Stratigakis – Saint-Étienne – 2024–2025
- Élisabeth Tsé – Le Havre – 2023–2025
- Sura Yekka – Le Havre – 2022

=== Costa Rica ===
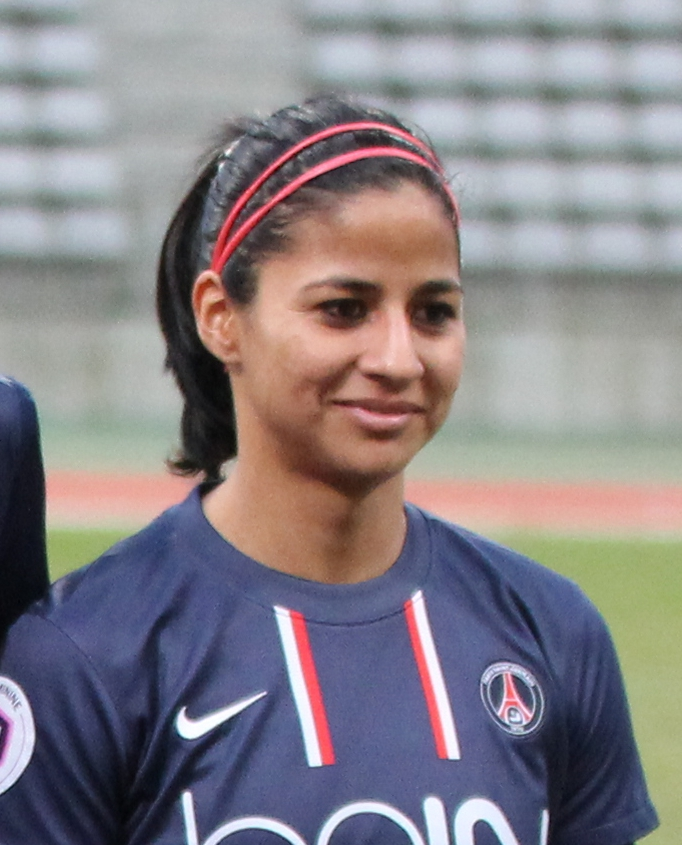
Shirley Cruz

- Sheika Scott – Paris – 2026
- Shirley Cruz – Lyon, PSG – 2006–2018
- Melissa Herrera – Bordeaux, Reims – 2018–2021
- Maria Paula Salas - Montpellier - 2026-

=== Guadeloupe ===
Note: As Guadeloupe is an overseas department of the French Republic, players listed here must also have been capped by the Guadeloupe women's national team, which is a member of CONCACAF, although not of FIFA.

- Anaïs Hatchi – Olympique Marseille – 2016–

=== Haiti ===
- **Roselord Borgella** – Issy, Dijon, Le Havre – 2020–2024
- Darlina Joseph – Grenoble, TOULOUSE, mARSILLE – 2023–
- **Melchie Dumornay** – Reims, Lyon – 2021–
- **Batcheba Louis** – Issy, Fleury – 2018–
- **Kethna Louis** – Issy, Reims, Montpellier, Le Havre – 2018–
- **Nérilia Mondésir** – Montpellier – 2017–2024
- Amandine Pierre-Louis – Metz, Rodez, Saint-Etienne – 2020–
- Chelsea Surpris – Grenoble, Yzeure Allier, ASJ Soyaux – 2020–2023
- Tabith Joseph – Marsille – 2025–
- Maudline Moryl _ Marsille – 2025–
- Chesliea Domond – Marsille – 2025–
- Deborah Bien-Aime – Saint Etienne – 2025

=== Jamaica ===
- Khadija Shaw – Bordeaux – 2019–2021
- Rebecca Spencer – Soyaux – 2011–2012
- **Chantelle Swaby** – Fleury – 2022–2024
- Lauren Silver – Metz – 2016–2017
- Jody Brown – Marsille – 2024–

=== Martinique ===
Note: As Martinique is an overseas department of the French Republic, players listed here must also have been capped by the Martinique women's national team, which is a member of CONCACAF, although not of FIFA.

- Élodie Dinglor – Saint Malo, Guingamp, Nantes – 2015
- Emmeline Mainguy – Fleury, Dijon, Guingamp – 2011–
- Aurélie Rougé – Soyaux – 2017–2020
- Maëva Salomon – Le Mans, Marseille, Saint-Maur, Bordeaux, PSG – 2014–
- Mylaine Tarrieu – OL Lyonnes, Bordeaux, Rodez, Dijon – 2013–
- Laurène Tresfield – Le Havre – 2020–

=== Mexico ===
- Emily Alvarado – Reims – 2021–2023
- Cristina Ferral – Marseille – 2017–2018
- Gabrielle Teres – Toulouse – 2009

=== Panama ===
- Aldrith Quintero – Fleury – 2025–

=== Puerto Rico ===
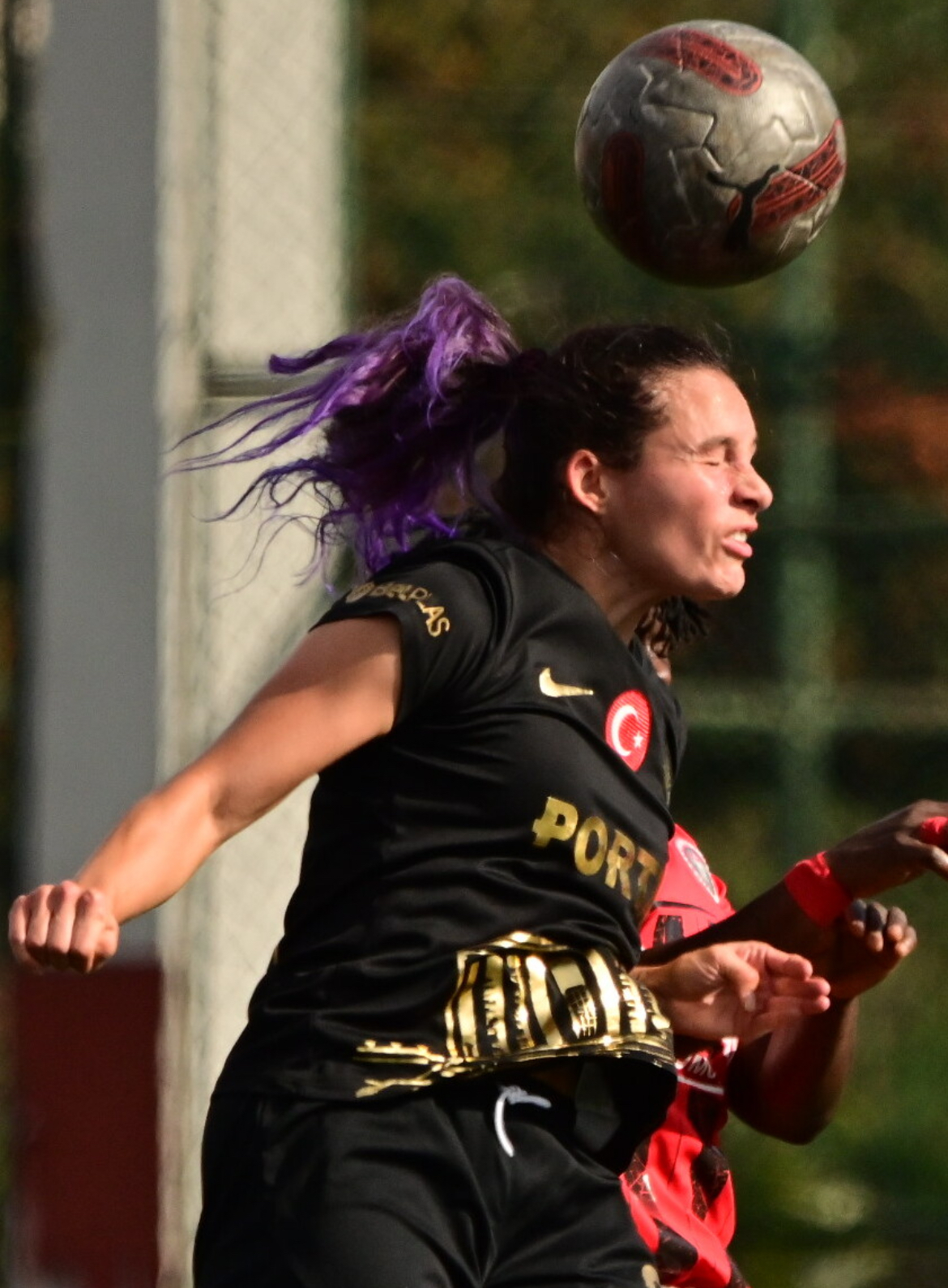
Danielle Marcano

- Danielle Marcano – Nantes – 2024–
- Caitlin Cosme – Nantes – 2024–

=== Saint Kitts and Nevis ===
- Phoenetia Browne – Saint Etienne – 2022–2024

=== Suriname ===
- Ashleigh Weerden – Montpellier – 2020–2022

=== Trinidad and Tobago ===
- **Kédie Johnson** – **Lille** – 2023–

=== United States ===
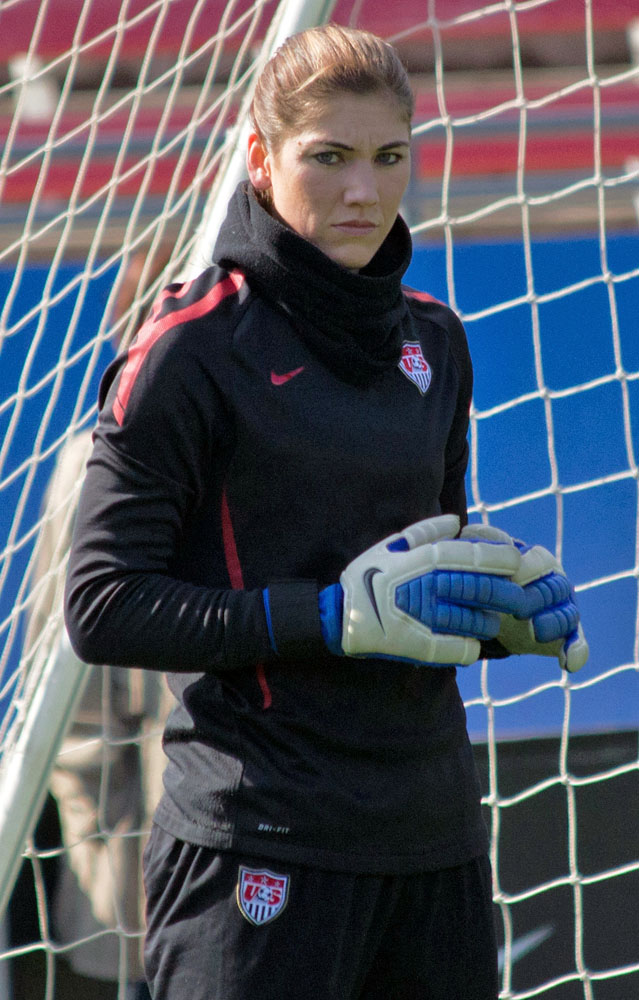
Hope Solo

- Murphy Agnew – Strasbourg – 2025–
- Crystal Dunn (née Soubrier) – PSG – 2025–
- Genessee Daughetee Puntigam – Dijon, Montpellier – 2014–2021
- Sofia Huerta – Lyon – 2024–
- Maddie Bauer – FC Fleury 91 – 2019
- Korbin Albert – PSG – 2023–
- Malia Berkely – Bordeaux – 2021
- Celeste Boureille – Montpellier, Fleury – 2020–
- Morgan Brian (née Gautrat) – Lyon – 2018
- Alana Cook – PSG – 2019–2021
- Rachel Corboz – Reims, Fleury – 2018–
- Hannah Diaz – Fleury – 2019–2021
- Lorrie Fair – Lyon – 2005
- Sh'Nia Gordon – Metz, Le Havre, Dijon, Montpellier – 2019–2024
- Carlin Hudson – Guingamp – 2019–2020
- Darian Jenkins – Bordeaux – 2020–2021
- Samantha Johnson – Soyaux – 2021
- Allie Thornton – Le Havre, Issy – 2020–2022
- Tobin Heath – PSG – 2013–2014
- Lindsey Horan (née Heaps) – Lyon – 2022
- Phallon Tullis-Joyce – Reims – 2019–2021
- Megan Lindsay – Metz – 2014–2015
- Catarina Macario – Lyon – 2020–2023
- Cosette Morché – Issy, Montpellier – 2021–2024
- Alex Morgan (née Carrasco) – Lyon – 2017
- Megan Rapinoe – Lyon – 2013–2014
- Danielle Slaton – Lyon – 2005
- Hope Solo(née Stevens) – Lyon – 2005
- Sarah Teegarden – Lille – 2020–
- Aly Wagner – Lyon – 2005
- Christie Welsh – Lyon – 2005
- Carleigh Williams – Metz – 2016–2017

== Oceania (OFC) ==
=== New Zealand ===
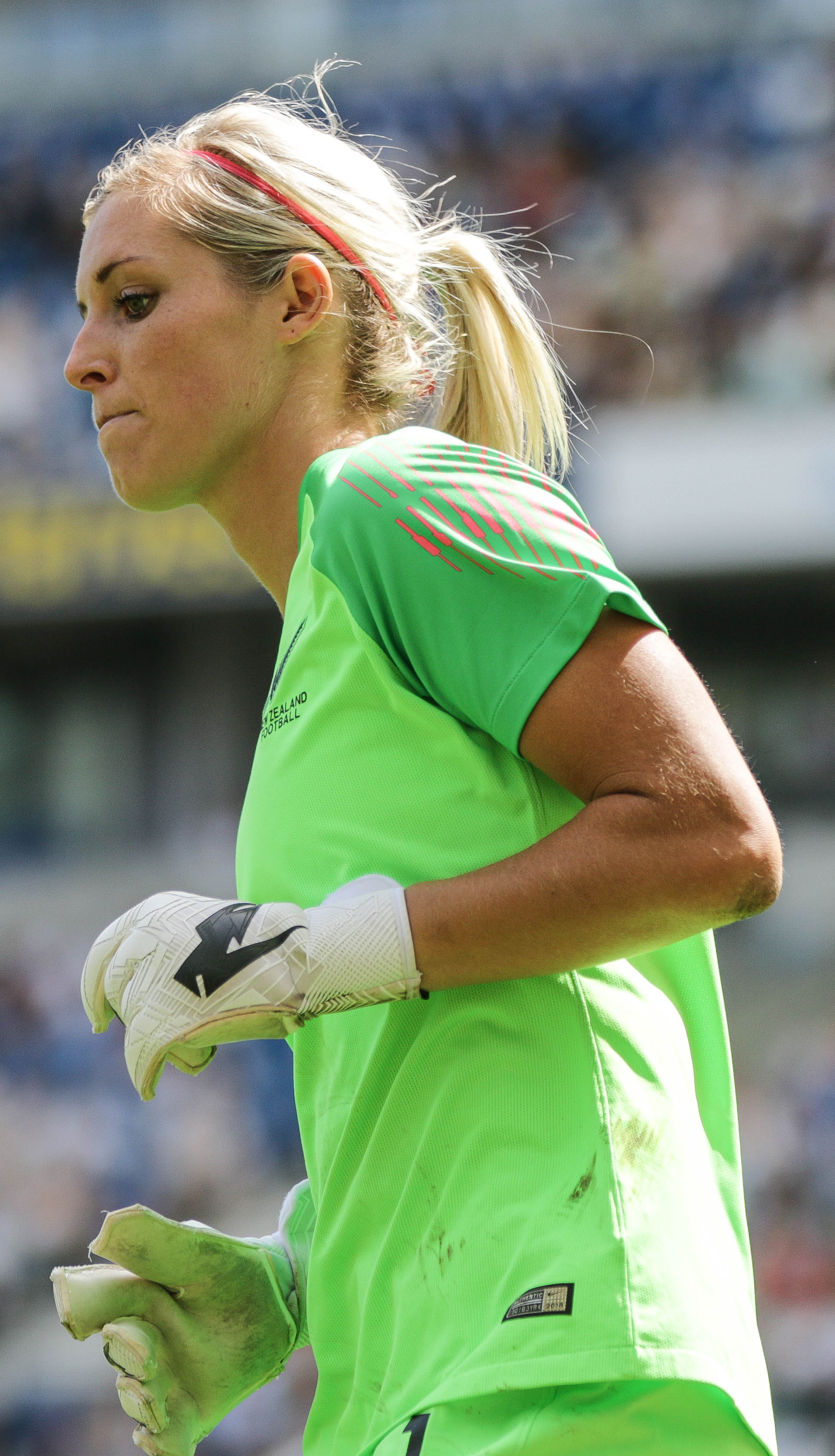
Erin Nayler

- Kate Taylor – Dijon – 2024–
- Erin Nayler – Lyon, Grenoble, Bordeaux – 2016–2020
- Suya Haering – Montpellier – 2026

=== Tahiti ===
- Vaihei Samin – Fleury – 2020–

== South America (CONMEBOL) ==
=== Argentina ===
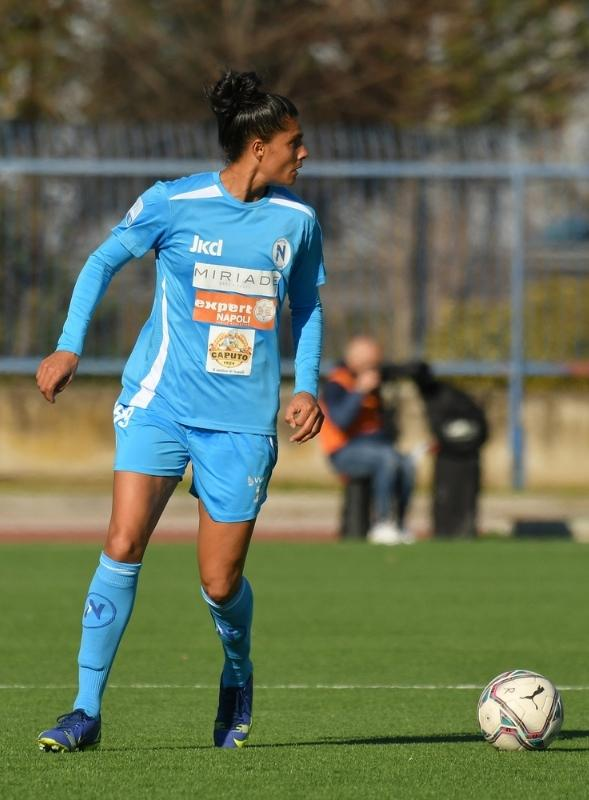
Sole Jaimes

- Aldana Cometti – Fleury – 2025–2026
- Sole Jaimes – Lyon – 2019
- Julieta Lema – Soyaux – 2022

=== Brazil ===
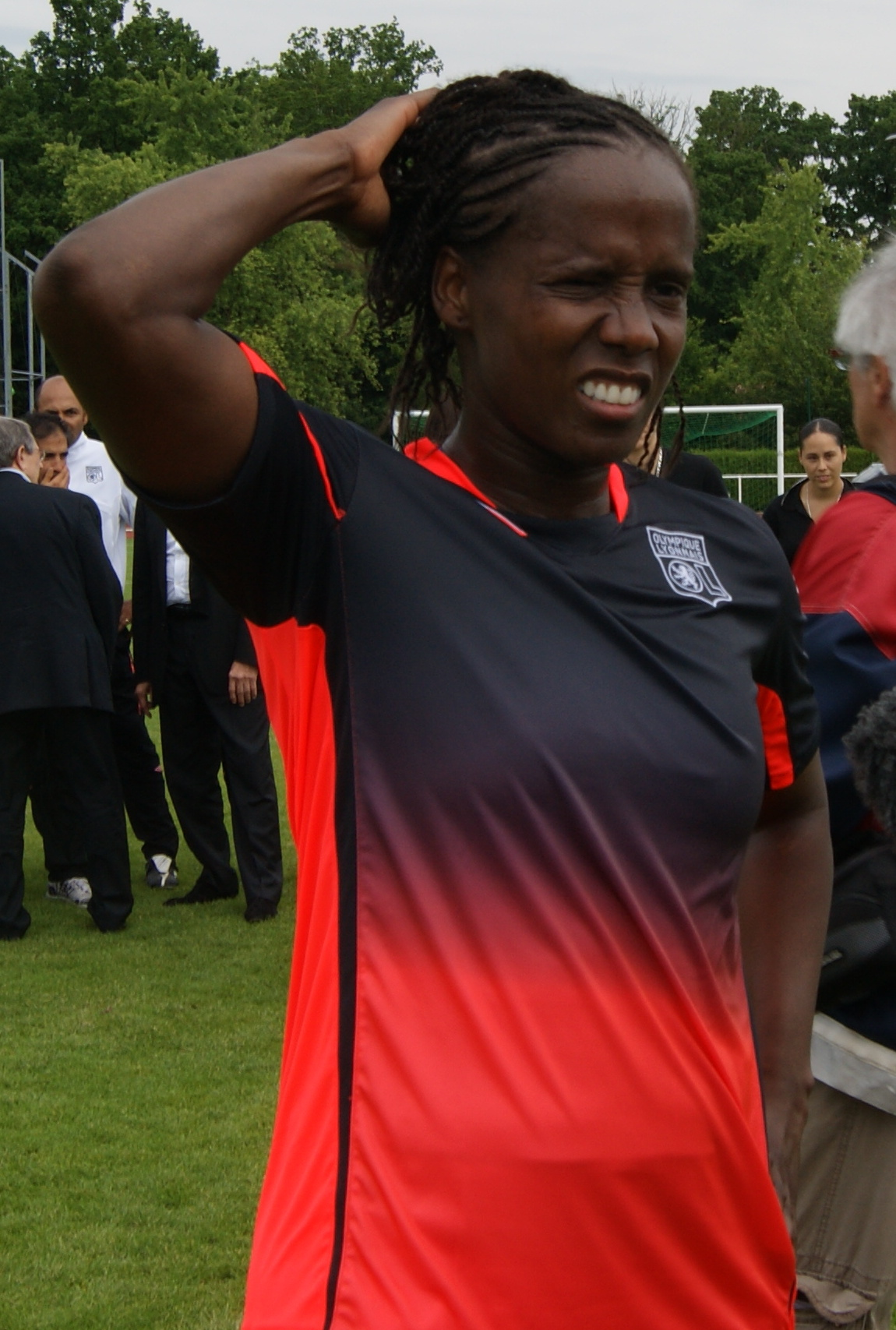
Katia

- **Isabela Chagas** – **PSG** – 2025–
- **Tarciane** – **Lyon** – 2025–
- Giovanna Waksman – Lyon – 2026
- **Vitória Yaya** – **PSG** – 2025–
- Thais – Yzeure Allier – 2009–2011
- Dayane da Rocha – Olympique Lyon – 2006
- Marjorie Boilesen – Lille OSC – 2023–2024
- Natascha Honegger – Paris – 2019–2021
- Tainara – Bordeaux – 2022
- Kátia – PSG, Lyon – 2007–2011
- Rosana – PSG, Lyon – 2009–2016
- Simone – Lyon – 2005–2010
- Kathellen Sousa – Bordeaux – 2018–2020
- Andressa Alves – Montpellier – 2015–2016
- Cristiane – PSG – 2015–2017
- Luana – PSG – 2020–2022
- Daiane Limeira – PSG – 2018
- Carol Baiana – Bordeaux, Dijon – 2017–2020
- Amanda Gutierres – Bordeaux – 2022
- Formiga – PSG – 2017–2021

=== Chile ===
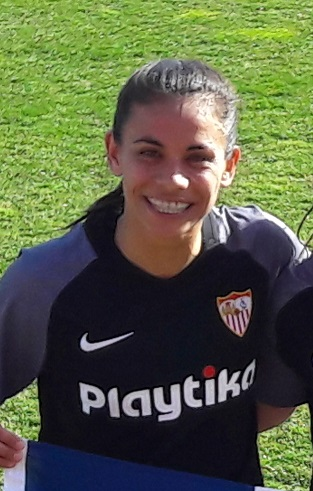
Francisca Lara in 2019

- **Christiane Endler** – PSG – 2017–2021
- Pancha Lara – Le Havre – 2020–2021
- Karen Araya – Nantes – 2025

=== Colombia ===
- Sintia Cabezas – Marseille – 2026
- Ángela Barón – Le Havre – 2025–
- Catalina Perez – Strasbourg – 2025–
- Karla Torres – Paris FC – 2025–
- Mary Alvarez – Marseille – 2026–
- Mayra Ramirez - PSG - 2026-

=== Ecuador ===
- Manoly Baquierzo – Paris – 2026

=== Venezuela ===
- Sonia O'Neill – FC Fleury 91 – 2019

== Notes ==
1. Born in Bosnia and Herzegovina
2. Born in Brazil
3. Born in Canada
4. Born in the Democratic Republic of the Congo
5. Born in England
6. Born in France
7. Born in Guinea
8. Born in Hong Kong
9. Born in Hungary
10. Born in Liberia
11. Born in the Netherlands
12. Born in South Africa
13. Born in Switzerland
14. Born in the United States
15. Capped for the Algeria women's national football team
16. Capped for the Canada women's national under-20 football team
17. Capped for the England women's national under-19 football team
18. Capped for the England women's national under-20 football team
19. Capped for the Spain women's national football team
20. Capped for the Spain women's national under-17 football team
21. Capped for the Spain women's national under-19 football team
22. Capped for the Spain women's national under-20 football team
23. Capped for the France women's national football team
24. Capped for the France women's national futsal team
25. Capped for the France women's national under-16 football team
26. Capped for the France women's national under-17 football team
27. Capped for the France women's national under-19 football team
28. Capped for the France women's national under-20 football team
29. Capped for the France women's national under-23 football team
30. Capped for the Morocco women's national football team
31. Capped for the Mexico women's national football team
32. Capped for the Mexico women's national under-20 football team
33. Capped for the Switzerland women's national under-19 football team
34. Capped for the United States women's national under-17 football team
35. Capped for the United States women's national under-19 football team
36. Capped for the United States women's national under-20 football team
37. Capped for the United States women's national under-23 football team
