= Aïssata =

Aïssata [a.i.sa.ta] is both a surname and a female given name. It is French spelling of a Fulani name ultimately derived from Arabic عَائِشَةُ (ʿāʾišatu, “Aisha”). Notable people with the name include:

Given name

- Aïssata Coulibaly (born 1983), Malian football player
- Aïssata Coulibaly (1920–1967), Malian activist
- Aissata Daffé (born 1956), Guinean politician
- Aïssata Issoufou Mahamadou, Nigerian First Lady and scientist
- Aïssata Kane (1938–2019), Mauritanian politician and women's rights activist
- Aïssata Lam (born 1986/87), Mauritanian women's rights activist
- Aïssata Soulama (born 1979), Burkinabé hurdler
- Aissata Diallo (born 1994), Guinean-American reality star

Surname

- Mounkaïla Aïssata, Nigerian politician
