= Sarah Puntigam =

Austrian footballer (born 1992)

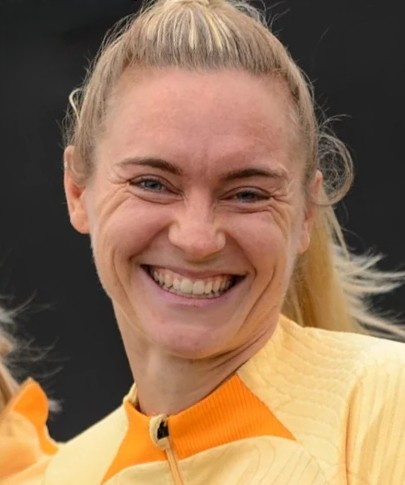
- Puntigam with the Houston Dash in 2025

Personal information
- Date of birth: 13 October 1992 (age 34)
- Place of birth: Raning, Austria
- Height: 1.73 m (5 ft 8 in)
- Position: Midfielder

Team information
- Current team: Houston Dash
- Number: 17

Youth career
- 2000–2007: USV Gnas
- 2007–2009: DFC LUV Graz

Senior career*
Years	Team	Apps	(Gls)
2009–2012	Bayern Munich II	25	(3)
2010–2013	Bayern Munich	17	(0)
2013–2014	SC Kriens		
2014–2018	SC Freiburg	79	(4)
2018–2022	Montpellier	71	(11)
2022–2023	1. FC Köln	21	(2)
2023–	Houston Dash	66	(1)

International career^{‡}
2010–2011	Austria U19	4	(7)
2009–	Austria	168	(26)
- * Club domestic league appearances and goals as of 03:17, 8 November 2026 (UTC) ‡ National team caps and goals as of 14 October 2026

Sarah Puntigam (born 13 October 1992) is an Austrian professional footballer who plays as a midfielder for the Houston Dash of the National Women's Soccer League (NWSL) and the Austria national team. She has previously played for German clubs Bayern Munich, SC Freiburg, and 1. FC Köln, Swiss club SC Kriens, and French club Montpellier.

== Club career ==
Puntigam played in her youth with USV Gnas from 2000 until 2007, helping them win the Eastern under-13 division twice and the under-15 division once. She then played with DFC LUV Graz in the ÖFB Frauen Bundesliga from 2007 until 2009.

Puntigam made her senior career debut in 2009 with Bayern Munich II in the 2009–10 2. Frauen-Bundesliga. She scored three goals in 25 appearances, before joining the first team in 2010.

Puntigam joined Swiss club SC Kriens in 2013. In June 2014, she scored SC Krien's only goal in the 2014 Swiss Women's Cup final 2–1 loss to FC Basel. Following the match the club disbanded, merging with FC Luzern.

In April 2014, Puntigam returned to Germany, joining SC Freiburg alongside former Bayern Munich and SC Kriens teammate Nicole Banecki. She scored four goals for Freiburg in 79 appearances.

In July 2018, Puntigam joined French club Montpellier as their first signing of the summer and the first Austrian in the history of the club. During her time at the French club, she contributed 10 goals and assists in 71 appearances.

On 5 May 2022, Puntigam joined Frauen-Bundesliga club 1. FC Köln on a two-year deal. During the 2022–23 Frauen-Bundesliga season, she scored two goals in 21 league appearances, as well as playing three matches in the DFB-Pokal.

After leaving 1. FC Köln in July 2023, Puntigam transferred to American club Houston Dash, signing a deal for the 2023 National Women's Soccer League season with an option for an extra year. In September 2024, the club signed Puntigam to a two-year contract extension.

== International career ==
Puntigam made her international debut on 4 March 2009 in a 2–1 win against Wales. She scored her first two goals with Austria in a 6–0 win against Faroe Islands on 3 March 2010.

Puntigam was part of the 23-women squad who represented Austria and reached the semi-finals at the UEFA Women's Euro 2017.

On 6 March 2020, Puntigam played her 100th match for Austria in a 1–1 draw against Switzerland. On 17 September 2021, she played her 110th match for Austria and surpassed Nina Burger to become country's all-time most capped player.

Puntigam was part of the Austrian squad that was called up to the UEFA Women's Euro 2022.

== Personal life ==
Puntigam was born in the Austrian city of Raning. She married her 1. FC Köln teammate Genessee Daughetee in June 2022.

== Honours ==
Bayern Munich

- DFB-Pokal: 2011–12

Austria

- Cyprus Cup: 2016

== Career statistics ==
Scores and results list Austria's goal tally first, score column indicates score after each Puntigam goal.

List of international goals scored by Sarah Puntigam
No.	Date	Venue	Opponent	Score	Result	Competition
1.	3 March 2010	José Arcanjo Stadium, Olhão, Portugal	Faroe Islands	4–0	6–0	2010 Algarve Cup
2.	3 March 2010	José Arcanjo Stadium, Olhão, Portugal	Faroe Islands	5–0	6–0	2010 Algarve Cup
3.	16 June 2012	FK Viktoria Stadion, Prague, Czech Republic	Czech Republic	1–0	3–2	UEFA Women's Euro 2013 qualifying
4.	25 October 2012	Olimp – 2, Rostov-on-Don, Russia	Russia	1–1	1–1	UEFA Women's Euro 2013 qualifying play-off
5.	22 August 2012	CASHPOINT Arena Altach, Austria	Switzerland	1–2	1–2	Friendly
6.	5 April 2014	Lovech Stadium, Lovech, Bulgaria	Bulgaria	4–0	6–1	2015 FIFA Women's World Cup qualification
7.	9 April 2014	MMArena, Le Mans, France	France	1–3	1–3	2015 FIFA Women's World Cup qualification
8.	17 September 2014	Waldstadion, Pasching, Austria	Kazakhstan	3–0	5–1	2015 FIFA Women's World Cup qualification
9.	22 September 2015	NV Arena, Sankt Pölten, Austria	Wales	2–0	3–0	UEFA Women's Euro 2017 qualifying
10.	23 November 2017	Bundesstadion Südstadt, Maria Enzersdorf, Austria	Israel	1–0	2–0	2019 FIFA Women's World Cup qualification
11.	7 March 2018	AEK Arena, Larnaca, Cyprus	Wales	1–0	1–1 (3–2 p)	2018 Cyprus Women's Cup
12.	12 June 2018	Ramat Gan Stadium, Ramat Gan, Israel	Israel	4–0	6–0	2019 FIFA Women's World Cup qualification
13.	10 March 2020	Estadio Municipal de Marbella Marbella, Spain	Switzerland	1–1	1–2	Friendly
14.	22 September 2020	Namyz Stadium, Shymkent, Kazakhstan	Kazakhstan	4–0	5–0	UEFA Women's Euro 2022 qualifying
15.	22 October 2021	Stadion Wiener Neustadt, Wiener Neustadt, Austria	Luxembourg	5–0	5–0	2023 FIFA Women's World Cup qualification
16.	12 April 2022	Stadion Wiener Neustadt, Wiener Neustadt, Austria	Latvia	1–0	8–0	2023 FIFA Women's World Cup qualification
17.	12 April 2022	Stadion Wiener Neustadt, Wiener Neustadt, Austria	Latvia	2–0	8–0	2023 FIFA Women's World Cup qualification
18.	7 April 2023	Stadion Wiener Neustadt, Wiener Neustadt, Austria	Belgium	1–2	3–2	Friendly
19.	9 April 2024	Stadion Miejski w Gdyni, Gdynia, Poland	Poland	1–0	3–1	UEFA Women's Euro 2025 qualifying League A
20.	31 May 2024	Josko Arena, Ried im Innkreis, Austria	Iceland	1–0	1–1	UEFA Women's Euro 2025 qualifying League A
21.	25 October 2024	Bonifika Stadium, Koper, Slovenia	Slovenia	2–0	3–0	UEFA Women's Euro 2025 qualifying play-offs
22.	29 October 2024	Stadion Wiener Neustadt, Wiener Neustadt, Austria	Slovenia	1–0	2–1	UEFA Women's Euro 2025 qualifying play-offs
23.	29 October 2024	Stadion Wiener Neustadt, Wiener Neustadt, Austria	Slovenia	2–0	2–1	UEFA Women's Euro 2025 qualifying play-offs
25.	28 October 2025	Franz Horr Stadium, Vienna, Austria	Czech Republic	1–0	2–0	2025 UEFA Women's Nations League play-off matches
26.	13 October 2026	Sportclub-Platz Dornbach, Vienna, Austria	Kosovo	2–0	4–0	2027 FIFA Women's World Cup qualification

== See also ==
- List of women's footballers with 100 or more international caps
