= Isabelle Le Dû =

French footballer

Personal information
- Date of birth: 24 May 1958 (age 68)
- Place of birth: Chevilly, Loiret, France
- Position: Forward

Senior career*
Years	Team	Apps	(Gls)
1974-1984	US Orléans		

International career
1983	France	1	(0)
- * Club domestic league appearances and goals

Isabelle Le Dû (born 24 May 1958) is a French former footballer who played as a striker for US Orléans. Le Dû represented France in the early 1980s.
