= Sarah Boudaoud =

Algerian international footballer (born 1995)

- Born: 28 September 1996 (age 29); Lyon France
- Occupation: footballer
- Known for: a defender or midfielder for ASA Issy

Sarah Boudaoud (Arabic: سارة بو داود; born 28 September 1995) is a former footballer who is last known to have played as a defender or midfielder for ASA Issy. Born in France, she was an Algeria international.

== Early life ==
Boudaoud started playing football at the age of nine with French side ASPTT Bron. Besides football, she practiced judo and swimming as a child.

== College career ==
Boudaoud obtained a master's degree in Management and Public Affairs at Sciences Po.

She played club soccer at the University of Florida.

== Club career ==
Boudaoud spent six seasons with French side Issy, before signing for French side Orléans. In 2022, Boudaoud retired from professional football at the age of twenty-five.

== International career ==
As a youth player, Boudaoud represented France internationally at youth level. After that, she represented the Algeria women's national football team at senior level.

== Style of play ==
Boudaoud is known for her in-game vision and technical ability. She can operate as a defender or midfielder.

== Parliamentary career ==
While playing football, Boudaoud also worked as a parliamentary assistant in the National Assembly.

== Personal life ==
Boudaoud is a supporter of French side OL and Spanish side Barcelona.
