= Amelie Rybäck =

Swedish footballer

Personal information
- Full name: Amelie Rybäck
- Date of birth: 6 August 1982 (age 44)
- Place of birth: Sweden
- Height: 1.72 m (5 ft 8 in)
- Position: Defender

Senior career*
Years	Team	Apps	(Gls)
1999–2009	Göteborg		
2010	Olympique Lyon	11	(0)
2010–2011	Stabæk		
2012	Jitex		
- * Club domestic league appearances and goals

Amelie Rybäck (or Amelie Rybeck), is a Swedish football defender who most recently played for Jitex BK in the Damallsvenskan. She previously played for Göteborg FC, Olympique Lyon in the French Division 1 and Stabæk Fotball in Norway's Toppserien.
