= Grace Rapp =

English football player

Personal information
- Date of birth: 6 July 1995 (age 31)
- Place of birth: Hong Kong
- Height: 1.72 m (5 ft 8 in)
- Position: Midfielder

College career
Years	Team	Apps	(Gls)
2014–2017	Miami Hurricanes	70	(7)

Senior career*
Years	Team	Apps	(Gls)
2011–2012	Keynsham Town		
2012–2014	Yeovil Town		
2018–2019	Selfoss	22	(5)
2019–2022	Reims	39	(0)

International career
	England U19	3	(0)
- * Club domestic league appearances and goals as of 16 April 2022

Grace Rapp (born 6 July 1995) is an English professional footballer who plays as a midfielder. She has played professionally in Iceland and France.
