= Mounkaïla Aïssata =

Nigerien politician

Mounkaila Aissata
- Citizenship: Nigerian
- Occupation: Politician

Mounkaïla Aïssata is a Nigerien politician. At one time the only female member of parliament, Aïssata is also a member of the Pan-African Parliament. In the Pan-African Parliament, she is a member of the Committee on Gender, Family, Youth and People with Disability.
