= Genessee Daughetee =

American soccer player (born 1992)

Genessee Puntigam
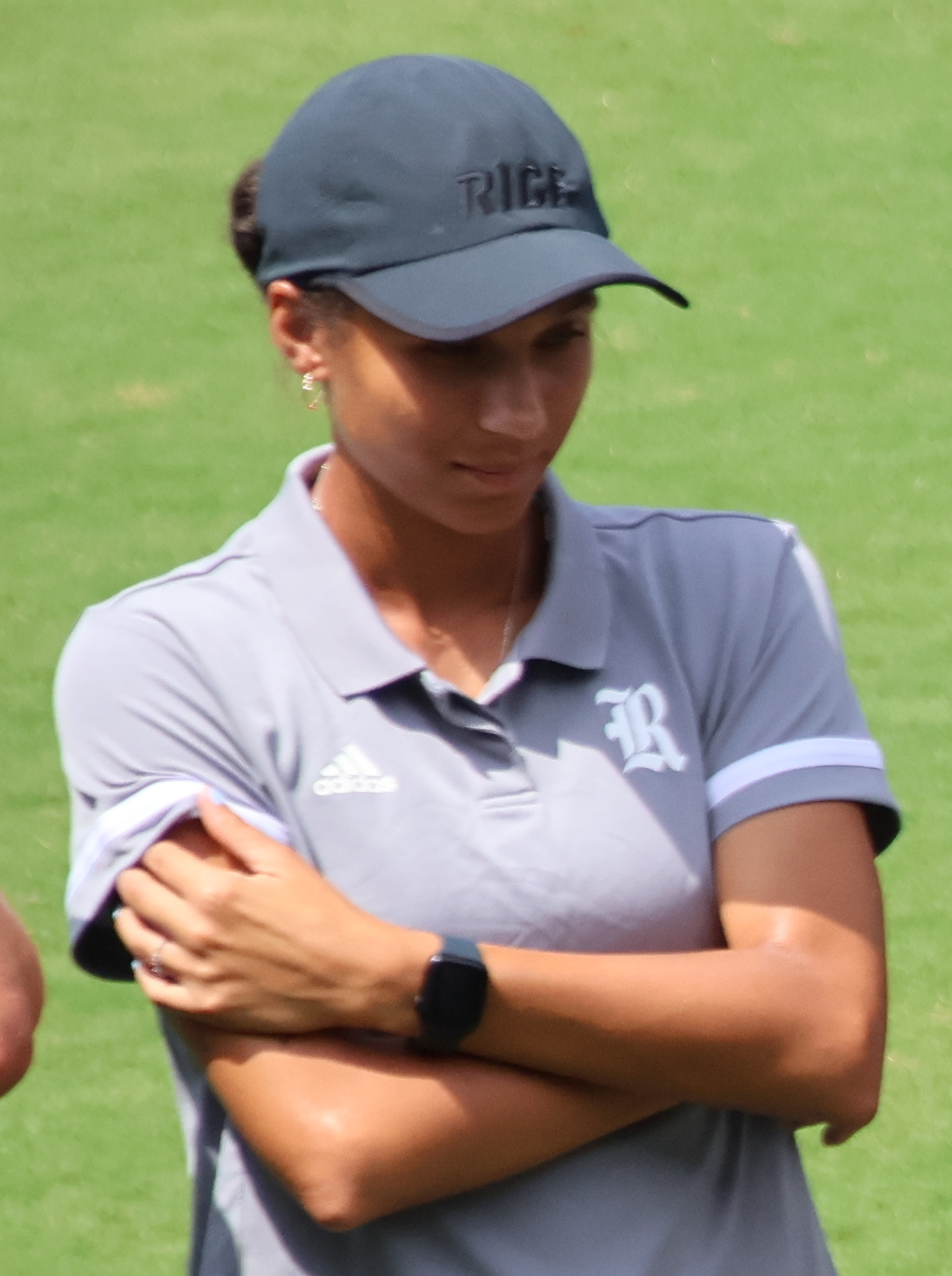
- Puntigam with Rice in 2025

Personal information
- Full name: Genessee Marcie Daughetee
- Date of birth: August 28, 1992 (age 34)
- Place of birth: Huntington Beach, California, U.S.
- Height: 1.73 m (5 ft 8 in)
- Position: Defender

College career
Years	Team	Apps	(Gls)
2010–2013	California Golden Bears	82	(1)

Senior career*
Years	Team	Apps	(Gls)
2014–2017	Montpellier	35	(0)
2017–2018	Vittsjö	21	(1)
2019	LA Galaxy OC		
2020–2021	Dijon	18	(0)
2022–2023	Köln	17	(0)

Managerial career
- 2023–: Rice Owls (assistant)
- * Club domestic league appearances and goals

Genessee Marcie Daughetee Puntigam (née Daughetee; born August 28, 1992) is an American soccer player.

== Personal life ==
Daughetee married her girlfriend and Köln teammate Sarah Puntigam in June 2022.
