= Raning =

- Former municipality
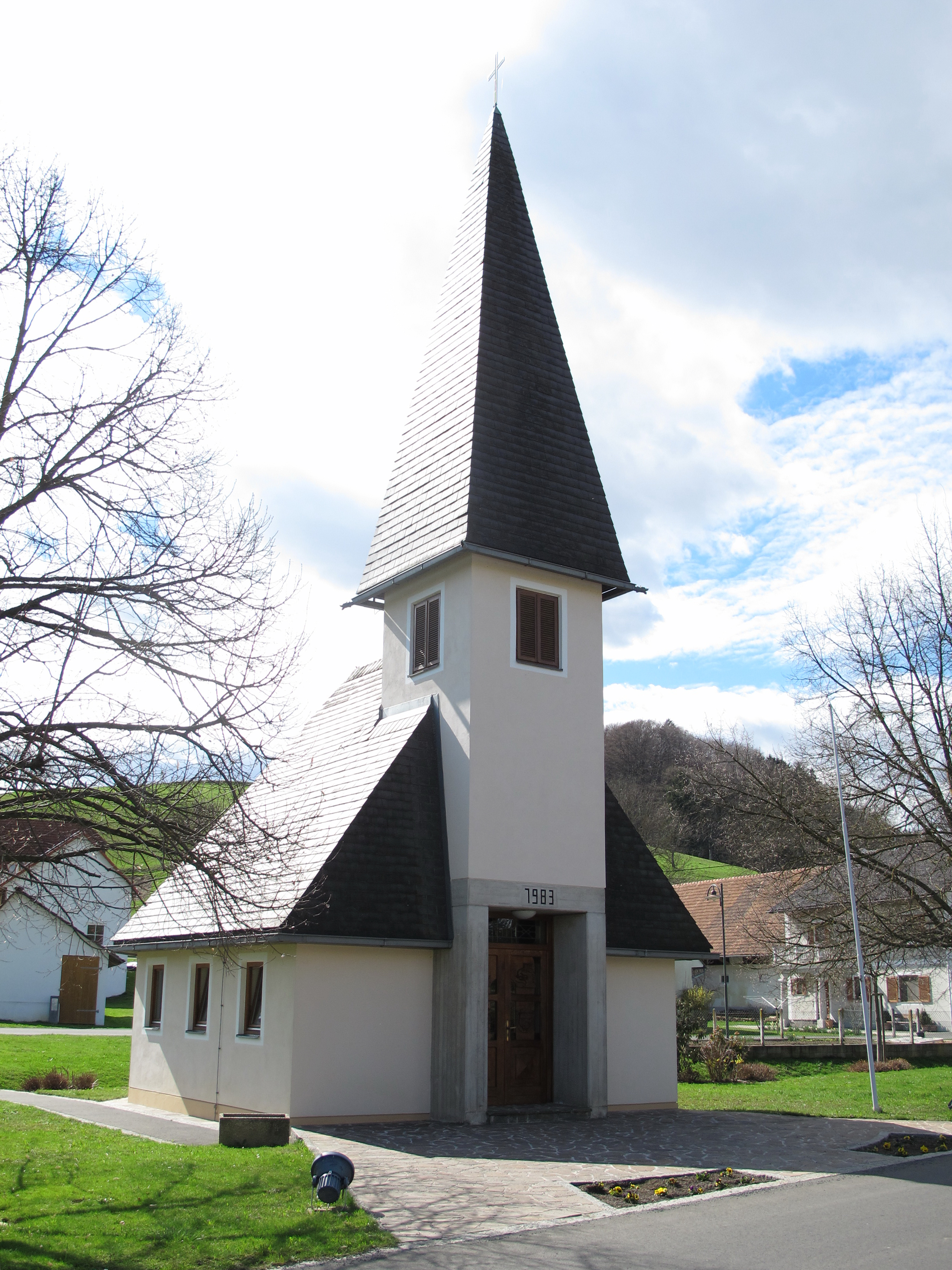
- Chapel in Raning

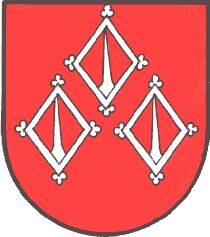
- Coat of arms

- Location within Styria#Location within Austria Raning (Austria)
- Coordinates: 46°52′00″N 15°49′00″E
- Country: Austria
- State: Styria
- District: Südoststeiermark

Area
  - Total: 8.2 km^{2} (3.2 sq mi)
- Elevation: 273 m (896 ft)

Population (1 January 2016)
  - Total: 810
  - Density: 99/km^{2} (260/sq mi)
- Time zone: UTC+1 (CET)
  - Summer (DST): UTC+2 (CEST)
- Postal code: 8342
- Area code: 03151
- Vehicle registration: FB
- Website: www.raning.at

Raning is a former municipality in the district of Südoststeiermark in the Austrian state of Styria. Since the 2015 Styria municipal structural reform, it is part of the municipality Gnas.

== Population ==
Historical population
Year	Pop.	±%
1869	919	—
1880	943	+2.6%
1890	919	−2.5%
1900	852	−7.3%
1910	851	−0.1%
1923	807	−5.2%
1934	795	−1.5%
1939	805	+1.3%
1951	750	−6.8%
1961	739	−1.5%
1971	783	+6.0%
1981	830	+6.0%
1991	842	+1.4%
2001	813	−3.4%
2013	805	−1.0%
