= Miracle Porter =

American soccer player

Personal information
- Date of birth: December 18, 1998 (age 27)
- Place of birth: Palm Coast, Florida
- Height: 1.76 m (5 ft 9 in)
- Position: Striker

Team information
- Current team: Glasgow City

College career
Years	Team	Apps	(Gls)
2017–2021	Florida Atlantic Owls	83	(17)

Senior career*
Years	Team	Apps	(Gls)
2022	Reims	5	(0)
2022	Gintra		
2023–	Glasgow City	6	(1)
- * Club domestic league appearances and goals

Miracle Porter (born December 18, 1998) is an American soccer player who plays as a striker for Glasgow City.

== Early life ==
Porter was born December 18, 1998, and started playing soccer at the age of three. She is the niece of a former soccer player.

== Youth career ==
Porter played for Matanzas High School, where she was regarded as an important player for the team. She scored over 229 goals, breaking the Florida high school state record.

== College career ==
In 2017, Porter joined the Florida Atlantic Owls in the United States after receiving offers from Arkansas, Seton Hall, Marist, Southeastern Louisiana, Stetson and South Florida.

== Club career ==
In 2022, she signed for Lithuanian side Gintra, where she played in the UEFA Women's Champions League. In 2023, she signed for Scottish side Glasgow City.

== International career ==
In 2012, Porter was selected for the U.S. Olympic Development Program.

== Style of play ==
Porter mainly operates as a striker and is known for her speed.
