= Aïssata Lam =

Mauritanian activist

Aïssata Lam (born in October 1986) is a Mauritanian Development Professional .

She is the cofounder and president of the Youth Chamber of Commerce of Mauritania (JCCM) and has a background in microfinance and agricultural finance. She works in climate finance and is very involved in youth and women empowerment on the African continent, specially in Mauritania.

She was appointed in 2019 by Emmanuel Macron to the G7 council on gender equality.

In 2019, she was listed among the BBC's 100 Women. and has been awarded the “Chevalier de l’Ordre National du Mérite” in 2020 by the Mauritanian Government.
