= Léa Abadou =

Algerian footballer (born 1997)

Léa Abadou ليا عبدو
Personal information
- Full name: Léa Soïzic Abadou
- Date of birth: 12 March 1997 (age 29)
- Place of birth: Landerneau, France
- Height: 1.72 m (5 ft 8 in)
- Position: Centre-back

Team information
- Current team: Orléans
- Number: 21

Youth career
- 2012–2014: Guingamp

Senior career*
Years	Team	Apps	(Gls)
2015–2019	Guingamp	19	(1)
2019	Rennes Bréquigny	2	(0)
2020–2022	Vendenheim	25	(1)
2022–2023	US Saint-Malo	19	(0)
2023–	Orléans	20	(1)

International career^{‡}
2023–	Algeria	3	(0)
- * Club domestic league appearances and goals as of 26 May 2024 ‡ National team caps and goals as of 5 December 2023

Léa Soïzic Abadou (Arabic: ليا سويزيك عبدو; born 12 March 1997) is a professional footballer who plays as a centre-back for Seconde Ligue club Orléans. Born in France, she represents Algeria at international level.

== Club career ==
=== Post-Guingamp ===
In 2019, Léa left Guingamp after seven years and joined CPB Rennes Bréquigny. A year later she joined Vendenheim for two seasons deal, marking the first time she played outside of Brittany.

In 2022, she moved from Vendenheim to US Saint-Malo in Division 2 Féminine for a season contract. In July 2023, US Orléans announced the signing of Abadou.

== International career ==
In September 2021, Abadou got her first call-up to the Algerian national team to participate in a preparational camp for the 2022 Women's Africa Cup of Nations qualification from 15 to 21 September 2023. In February 2023, Following the appointment of Farid Benstiti as head coach of the Algeria national team, she got re-called up again to participate in a training camp from 13 to 21 February 2023.

On 18 July 2023, Abadou debuted for the national team as a starter in a 4–nil loss to Senegal. On 27 November 2024, She scored her first goal for the fennecs in a 2–1 win against Uganda.

== Career statistics ==
As of match played 26 November 2023

Appearances and goals by club, season and competition
Club	Season	League			Cup		Continental		Other		Total	
Club	Season	Division	Apps	Goals	Apps	Goals	Apps	Goals	Apps	Goals	Apps	Goals
EA Guingamp	2014–15	Division 1 Féminine	2	0	–	–	—		—		2	0
EA Guingamp	2015–16	Division 1 Féminine	–	–	–	–	—		—		–	–
EA Guingamp	2016–17	Division 1 Féminine	1	0	–	–	—		—		1	0
EA Guingamp	2017–18	Division 1 Féminine	6	0	2	1	—		—		8	1
EA Guingamp	2018–19	Division 1 Féminine	8	0	–	–	—		—		8	0
EA Guingamp	Total		17	0	2	1	—		—		19	1
Rennes Bréquigny	2018–2019	Division 2 Féminine	2	0	–	–	—		—		2	0
Rennes Bréquigny	Total		2	0	–	–	—		—		2	0
Vendenheim	2020–2021	Division 2 Féminine	5	0	–	–	—		—		5	0
Vendenheim	2021–2022	Division 2 Féminine	19	1	1	0	—		—		20	1
Vendenheim	Total		24	1	1	0	—		—		25	1
US Saint-Malo	2022–2023	Division 2 Féminine	19	0	0	0	—		—		19	0
US Saint-Malo	Total		19	0	0	0	—		—		19	0
US Orléans	2023–2024	Division 2 Féminine	7	0	1	0	—		—		8	0
US Orléans	Total		7	0	1	0	—		—		8	0
Career total			69	1	4	1	—		—		73	2

=== International ===
As of match played 5 December 2023

Appearances and goals by national team and year
National team	Year	Apps	Goals
Algeria	2023	8	0
Total		3	0

As of match played 27 November 2024
Scores and results list Algeria's goal tally first, score column indicates score after each Abadou goal.

List of international goals scored by Léa Abadou
No.	Date	Venue	Opponent	Score	Result	Competition
1	27 November 2024	Mustapha Tchaker Stadium, Blida, Algeria	Uganda	2–1	2–1	International Friendly
