= Patricia Mbazogho =

Gabonese footballer (born 1990)

Personal information
- Full name: Patricia Mbazogho Ndong
- Date of birth: 7 October 1990
- Place of birth: Gabon
- Position: Midfielder

Senior career*
Years	Team	Apps	(Gls)
2015–2016	Limoges FC		
2016–2017	ASJ Soyaux-Charente		
2017–2018	US Orléans		
2018–2019	FF Yzeure Allier Auvergne		

International career
- Gabon
- * Club domestic league appearances and goals

Patricia Mbazogho Ndong (born 7 October 1990) is a Gabonese footballer who plays as a midfielder.

== Early life ==
Mbazogho started her career with Gabonese side Académie Club de Libreville.

== Club career ==
In 2016, Mbazogho signed for French side Limoges FC, where she played in the Coupe de France. After that, she signed for French side US Orléans, helping the club achieve promotion.

== International career ==
Mvazogho played for the Gabon women's national football team.

== Style of play ==
Mbazogho has been described as "versatile in the offensive sector, she has the ability to play with both feet and relies on her liveliness and percussion to hurt opposing defenses".

== Personal life ==
Mbazogho is a native of Oyem, France.
