= US Orléans (women) =

Women's football club in Orléans, France

- Full name: Union Sportive Orléans Loiret Football féminines
- Nickname: Les Guêpes
- Founded: 1968; 58 years ago as AS Orléans
- Ground: Stade de la Source
- Capacity: 7,533
- President: Cyril Courtin
- Coach: Mathias Bastos; Régis Mohar
- League: Division 3 Féminine
- 2024–25: Seconde Ligue, 11th of 11 (relegated)
Home colours	Away colours

Union Sportive Orléans Loiret Football féminines (pronounced [ynjɔ̃ spɔʁtiv ɔʁleɑ̃]; commonly referred to as US Orléans or simply Orléans) is a French women's professional football club based in Orléans. The club is the women's section of US Orléans and competes in the Division 3 Féminine, the third tier of the French football system.

== History ==
The women's section of Arago Sport Orléanais was established in 1941 and led to the creation of the first women's football team in Loiret in 1968.

In 1970, Bernard Ranoul, a former player of the club, founded the first women's football team in Loiret. The team entered the Eure-et-Loir district championship in 1971 due to the absence of local competitors.

The club was among the 16 teams to compete in the inaugural season of the French Women's Championship in 1974–75. The team reached the final but lost 5–0 to Stade de Reims. The following seasons saw mixed performances, including a fourth-place finish in 1975–76 and then merging with US Orleans to form US Orléans Arago in 1976.

Throughout the late 1970s and 1980s, US Orléans remained in Division 1, achieving varying results but facing relegation to regional competitions in 1991.

After nearly two decades at the regional level, the team began a resurgence in 2009, winning multiple Division d'Honneur titles and narrowly missing promotion to Division 2 in several seasons.

In 2018, the team returned to the national stage, securing promotion to Division 2 after a playoff victory over FC Rouen, coinciding with the 50th anniversary of the women's section. The season was capped off with a Coupe du Centre triumph.

After maintaining their place in Division 2 for the 2023–24 season, the club's management considered relegating the team to a lower division for budgetary reasons or shutting down the women's section entirely to prioritize the men's team. However, support from Jean-Michel Aulas, the minister of sports, local authorities, and regional governments helped secure the team’s place in the second tier.

== Players ==
=== Current squad ===
As of 7 December 2024

Note: Flags indicate national team as defined under FIFA eligibility rules; some limited exceptions apply. Players may hold more than one non-FIFA nationality.

No.	Pos.	Nation	Player
1	GK	FRA	Manon Galichet
3	DF	POR	Mariane Amaro
4	DF	FRA	Lilou Charron
5	DF	FRA	Charlotte Noël
6	MF	FRA	Adja Binate
7	DF	FRA	Elisa Cardoso
8	MF	FRA	Leïla Kadri
10	MF	FRA	Laurène Martin
11	FW	FRA	Namnata Traoré
12	MF	FRA	Luna Berthe
14	MF	FRA	Axelle Monnot
17	MF	FRA	Clara Mogendre

No.	Pos.	Nation	Player
18	FW	FRA	Lauralie Rubègue
19	FW	FRA	Pauline Cousin
20	DF	FRA	Alizée Leroy
21	MF	ALG	Léa Abadou
22	FW	SRB	Sara Vranić
23	DF	FRA	Justine Popot
25	DF	FRA	Cyriel Sibailly
26	MF	FRA	Kenza Abidi
27	FW	FRA	Pauline Martin
29	DF	FRA	Cassandre Fernandes
30	GK	FRA	Audrey Dupupet
69	GK	FRA	Alyssia Paljevic

=== Notable players ===
Below are the notable former players who have represented Orléans in and international competition since the club's foundation in 1976. To appear in the section below, a player must have played in at least 80 official matches for the club or have represented their respective national team during their stint at the club or after the player's departure.

- (France) Isabelle Le Dû

== Current staff ==
As of 28 December 2024

Position	Name
Head coach	(France) Mathias Bastos (France) Régis Mohar
Assistant coach	(France) Mathias Bastos
Strength and Conditioning Coach	(France) Cédric Lacaïle
Video Analyst	(France) Youssef Halla
