= Serena Queirós =

Portuguese footballer (born 2004)

Personal information
- Full name: Serena Duarte Pinto de Queirós
- Date of birth: 1 December 2004 (age 21)
- Place of birth: Niort, France
- Position: Forward

Senior career*
Years	Team	Apps	(Gls)
2022–2024	Bordeaux		
2024–2026	Rio Ave F.C.		
- * Club domestic league appearances and goals

Serena Duarte Pinto de Queirós is a Portuguese footballer who played for Bordeaux.
