= Aïssata Coulibaly =

Malian footballer (born 1983)

Aïssata Sankoun Coulibaly
Personal information
- Date of birth: 12 May 1983 (age 43)
- Place of birth: Bamako, Mali

Senior career*
Years	Team	Apps	(Gls)
- AS Mandé
- RC Saint -Étienne
- Caïman AC de Lome

International career
2003 -	Mali		
- * Club domestic league appearances and goals

Aïssata Sankoun Coulibaly (born May 12, 1983) is a Malian football player who plays defense for the Mali women's national football team.

== Biography ==
Coulibaly was born on May 12, 1983, in Bamako, the capital city of Mali. She plays the position of a lateral defender. Coulibaly started her career in Mali with AS Mandé football club. In 2004, Aïssata moved from Mali to the reserve of the Association Sportive de Saint-Étienne Loire (RC Saint -Étienne) in France. In January 2006, she was promoted to the Division one Féminine team of RC Saint -Étienne, where Coulibaly on May 21 that year made her professional debut against Stade Briochin Football Féminin. After four years playing for the St. Etienne AS, she returned to the African continent and since then has been playing for the Caïman AC de Lome in Togo. Coulibaly has since 2003 been playing for the Malian women national football team. She has made three appearances in FIFA World Cup tournaments out of which her team drew twice and lost once to Ghana in 2003.
