= FC Rouen (women) =

- Full name: Football Club de Rouen 1899 Féminin
- Founded: 1970
- Ground: Stade de la Ferme, Rouen
- Chairman: Pascal Darmon
- Manager: Stéphane Arnold
- League: Division 2
- 2011–12: Division 2, Group A, 8th
Home colours	Away colours

FC Rouen Féminin is the women's team of French football club FC Rouen, based in Rouen.

== History ==
The team was originally established in 1970. In 1974 it was one of the twelve founding clubs of the Division 1 Féminine, and in 1976 it was the championship's runner-up. However, the section was dissolved the following year. In 2001 FC Rouen again created a women's team, which currently competes in the second tier. Most recently it was 8th in the category's Group A and it reached the 2012 Coupe de France's Round of 64.

=== Notable former players ===
French

- Annie Bataille
- Armelle Binard
- Nicole Carrie
- Nicole Revet

== Titles ==
- Coupe de Normandie
  - 2010, 2011, 2012
