= 2011–12 Coupe de France Féminine =

Tournament details
- Country: France
- Teams: 397

Final positions
- Champions: Lyon
- Runners-up: Montpellier

The 2011–12 Coupe de France Féminine was the 11th edition of the French cup competition for women. This was the inaugural edition of the competition under the name Coupe de France Féminine, as for the past decade, it was played under the name Challenge de France. The defending champions were Saint-Étienne who defeated Montpellier 3–2 on penalties in the 2010–11 edition of the final. The competition was organized by the French Football Federation and is open to all women's French football clubs in France. On 13 May 2012, Lyon earned its fourth Coupe de France Féminine title after defeating rivals Montpellier 2–1 in the final match, which was played at the Stade Jacques Rimbault in Bourges.

== Calendar ==
On 25 August 2011, the French Football Federation announced the calendar for the Coupe de France Féminine.

Round	First match date	Fixtures	Clubs	Notes
Regional finals	11 December 2011			
First Round	8 January 2012			Clubs participating in D2 Féminine gain entry.
Second Round	29 January 2012			
Round of 32	19 February 2012	16	32 → 16	Clubs participating in D1 Féminine gain entry.
Round of 16	11 March 2012	8	16 → 8	
Quarter-finals	8 April 2012	4	8 → 4	
Semi-finals	29 April 2012	2	4 → 2	
Final	13 May 2012	1	2 → 1	

== First round ==
The draw for the first round of the Coupe de France Féminine was held on 19 December 2011 at the headquarters of the French Football Federation in Paris. The draw was conducted by current French women's national team manager Bruno Bini and women's international and Paris Saint-Germain player Laure Lepailleur. The matches were contested on 8–9 January 2012. The postponed matches were played on 15 January.

Tie no	Home team	Score	Away team
1	Brest Bergot	0–4	Saint-Herblain
2	Lorient Féminin	3–0	Rennes Bréquigny
3	Couffé Conquérante	2–1	Ploermel
4	Plédéliac	3–2	Quimper Kerfeunteun
5	Sablé-sur-Sarthe	0–2	Saint-Georges
6	La Roche-sur-Yon	4–1	Angers Croix-Blanche
7	Toulouse Féminin	4–1	ASPTT Albi
8	Sainte Christie Preignan	2–4	Saint-Simon
9	Varetz	2–9	Limoges Landouge
10	Lafrançaise	4–1	Sarrancolin
11	Arlac Mérignac	9–0	Mauriac Ally
12	Jurançon	1–2	Blanquefort
13	Monteux	2–0	Claix
14	Aubignan	1–0	La Véore
15	Marseille Féminin	1–2	Nîmes Métropole
16	Cannes Bocca	0–4	Villeneuve-lès-Maguelone
17	Vabres L'Abbaye	0–4	ASPTT Montpellier
18	Cruas	0–2	Saint-Christol
19	Plaine Revermont	1–6	Nivolas
20	Dommartin Tour	0–0 (a.e.t); 4–5 pen.	Flacé Macon
21	Blanzy	1–2	Le Puy Féminin
22	Caluire Filles	1–4	Arpajon
23	Montmerle	1–5	Saint Romain Sanne
24	Saint Martin-en-Haut	0–0 (a.e.t); 3–0 pen.	Aulnat
25	Saessolsheim	0–4	Algrange
26	Épinal Féminin	0–2	Dijon Féminin

Tie no	Home team	Score	Away team
27	Wittelsheim	0–2	Besançon Féminin
28	Rossfeld	0–5	Mars Bischheim
29	Illzach Modenheim	1–6	Saint-Vit
30	Strasbourg Musau	0–7	Chatenoy-le-Royal
31	Compiègne Oise	3–3 (a.e.t); 4–2 pen.	Issy-les-Moulineaux
32	Troyes Féminin	0–2	Arras Féminin
33	Colombes	1–7	Woippy
34	Saint Quentin	14–0	Dijon Université
35	Nancy Féminin	1–4	Herblay
36	Estrées	0–2	Rochette Vaux
37	Abbeville	1–1 (a.e.t); 1–3 pen.	Rouen
38	Athis Mons	1–0	Pont de l'Arche
39	Flers	0–4	Gonfreville Féminin
40	Thiberville	1–1 (a.e.t); 4–5 pen.	Gravelines Féminin
41	Seizième	2–7	Cormelles
42	Rouvroy	6–0	Leers
43	Lumbres	1–3	Templemars Vendeville
44	Amiens Montières	0–1	Condé-sur-Noireau
45	Poitiers 3 Cités	4–2	Montigny-le-Bretonneux
46	Saumur Féminin	0–2	Domont
47	Paris-Charenton	2–2 (a.e.t); 0–3 pen.	Bagneux
48	Seizième	0–6	Corné
49	Bourges Féminin	2–1	Saint-Maur
50	Naintre	1–2	Dreux Féminin
51	Changé	0–4	Tours Féminin
52	Orléans Féminin	0–3	Le Mans Féminin

== Second round ==
The draw for the second round of the Coupe de France Féminine was held on 11 January 2012 at the headquarters of the French Football Federation in Paris. The draw was conducted by the former Miss France and Miss Europe Alexandra Rosenfeld and French journalist David Astorga. The matches were played on 29 January.

Tie no	Home team	Score	Away team
1	Saint-Christol	1–1 (a.e.t); 3–1 pen.	ASPTT Montpellier
2	Nîmes Métropole	1–2	Montpellier
3	Aubignan	0–0 (a.e.t); 5–6 pen.	Saint-Simon
4	Lafrançaise	1–4	Villeneuve-lès-Maguelone
5	Muret	2–2 (a.e.t); 3–4 pen.	Rodez Féminin
6	Monteux	0–0 (a.e.t); 3–4 pen.	Toulouse Féminin
7	Couffé Conquérante	2–1	Limoges Landouge
8	Soyaux	2–2 (a.e.t); 3–4 pen.	La Roche-sur-Yon
9	Saint-Herblain	0–7	Juvisy
10	Blanquefort	4–1	Tours Féminin
11	Saint-Georges	1–1 (a.e.t); 5–4 pen.	Arlac Mérignac
12	Corné	1–1 (a.e.t); 6–5 pen.	Poitiers 3 Cités

Tie no	Home team	Score	Away team
13	Guingamp Féminin	0–1	Paris SG Féminin
14	Bagneux	1–2	Cormelles-le-Royal
15	Dreux Féminin	0–20	Le Mans Féminin
16	Rochette Vaux	1–4	Gonfreville Féminin
17	Condé-sur-Noireau	2–0	Rouen
18	Plédéliac	1–7	Lorient Féminin
19	Chatenoy-le-Royal	1–2	Flacé Mâcon
20	Saint-Vit	0–2	Saint Romain Sanne
21	Le Puy Féminin	0–2	Saint-Étienne Féminin
22	Saint Martin-en-Haut	2–3	Bourges Féminin
23	Lyon Féminin	6–0	Yzeure
24	Nivolas	2–0	Besançon Féminin
25	Arpajon	1–0	Dijon Féminin
26	Woippy	5–1	Saint Quentin
27	Vendenheim	1–3	Hénin-Beaumont
28	Domont	0–0 (a.e.t); 4–2 pen.	Algrange
29	Athis Mons	0–3	Gravelines Féminin
30	Mars Bischheim	1–2	Arras Féminin
31	Rouvroy	0–5	Herblay
32	Templemars Vendeville	1–1 (a.e.t); 1–3 pen.	Compiègne Oise

== Round of 32 ==
The draw for the Round of 32 of the Coupe de France Féminine was held on 1 February 2012 at the headquarters of the French Football Federation in Paris. The draw was conducted by television host Julie Raynaud and former French international Grégory Coupet. The matches were played through 19–22 February.

Tie no	Home team	Score	Away team
1	Villeneuve-lès-Maguelone	0–1	Rodez Féminin
2	Saint-Simon	0–5	Montpellier Féminin
3	Saint-Christol	0–6	Toulouse Féminin
4	Arpajon	1–2	Blanquefort
5	Herblay	2–4	Compiègne Oise
6	Nivolas	3–0	Flacé Macon
7	Saint Romain Sanne	1–0	Bourges Féminin
8	Saint-Étienne Féminin	0–4	Lyon Féminin

Tie no	Home team	Score	Away team
9	Woippy	3–3 (a.e.t); 5–4 pen.	Gonfreville Féminin
10	Hénin-Beaumont	1–3	Juvisy
11	Gravelines Féminin	4–3	Cormelles-le-Royal
12	Domont	1–7	Arras Féminin
13	Saint-Georges	0–15	Paris SG Féminin
14	Couffé Conquérante	1–2	Condé-sur-Noireau
15	La Roche-sur-Yon	3–0	Corné
16	Lorient Féminin	1–2	Le Mans Féminin

== Round of 16 ==
The draw for the Round of 16 of the Coupe de France Féminine was held on 27 February 2012 at the headquarters of the French Football Federation in Paris. The draw was conducted by federation president Noël Le Graët. The matches were played on 11 March.

Tie no	Home team	Score	Away team
1	Montpellier Féminin	0–0 (a.e.t); 4–2 pen.	Rodez Féminin
2	Toulouse Féminin	1–0	Blanquefort
3	Nivolas	0–2	La Roche-sur-Yon
4	Saint Romain Sanne	0–7	Lyon Féminin
5	Woippy	1–1 (a.e.t); 2–4 pen.	Compiègne Oise

Tie no	Home team	Score	Away team
6	Juvisy	0–0 (a.e.t); 3–4 pen.	Paris SG Féminin
7	Le Mans Féminin	0–0 (a.e.t); 1–3 pen.	Gravelines Féminin
8	Arras Féminin	3–0	Condé-sur-Noireau

== Quarter-finals ==
The draw for the quarter-finals and semi-finals of the Coupe de France Féminine was held on 21 March 2012 at the Place Marcel Plaisant in Bourges. The draw was conducted by the president of the Ligue du Football Amateur (LFA) Bernard Barbet.

8 April	Lyon	11 – 1	Compiègne Oise	Stade de Gerland, Lyon
15:00	Franco 13'; Otaki 36'; Nécib 41'; Schelin 42', 55', 62', 90+1', 90+2'; Abily 61'; Le Sommer 66'; Dickenmann 73'	Report	Ndoulou 72'	Referee: Lugdivine Cinquini (Méditerranée)

8 April	Paris Saint-Germain	7 – 0	Gravelines	Stade Georges Lefèvre, Saint-Germain-en-Laye
15:00	Coton-Pélagie 13', 43', 61', 79', 89', 90'; Houara 34'	Report		Referee: Nathalie Le Breton (Centre-Ouest)

8 April	La Roche-sur-Yon	2 – 3	Arras	Stade de Saint-André-d'Ornay, La Roche-sur-Yon
15:00	Sauques 12'; Pasquereau 39'	Report	Bultel 51', 56'; Gracial 78'	Referee: Sabine Bonnin (Centre)

8 April	Montpellier	5 – 1	Toulouse	Complexe Sportif Roger Bambuck, Baillargues
15:00	Lattaf 17', 89'; Gadéa 21'; Delie 42'; Diguelman 49'	Report	90+2'	Referee: Solenne Bartnik (Rhône-Alpes)

== Semi-finals ==
28 April	Arras	0 – 8	Lyon	Stade Degouve Brabant, Arras
14:30		Report	Rosana 2'; Renard 4'; Otaki 12', 69', 77'; Schelin 65'; Thomis 86'; Le Sommer 89' (pen.)	Referee: Severine Craipeau (Pays de la Loire)

1 May	Paris Saint-Germain	0 – 1	Montpellier	Stade Georges Lefèvre, Saint-Germain-en-Laye
15:00		Report	Torrent 13'	Referee: Sabine Bonnin (Centre)

== Final ==
13 May
16:45

Montpellier	1 – 2	Lyon
Derevière 76'	Report	Schelin 2', 13'

Stade Jacques Rimbault, Bourges
Referee: Élodie Coppola (Brittany)

Montpellier	Lyon

MONTPELLIER:
GK	1	(France) Laëtitia Philippe
RB	8	(Japan) Aya Sameshima
CB	5	(France) Ophélie Meilleroux (c)
CB	3	(France) Kelly Gadéa
LB	4	(France) Marion Torrent
CM	14	(France) Mélissa Plaza	(substituted off) 54'
CM	25	(Japan) Rumi Utsugi
RM	11	(France) Ludivine Diguelman	(substituted off) 68'
LM	21	(France) Stéphanie De Rivière	(substituted off) 90'
FW	33	(France) Hoda Lattaf
FW	6	(France) Marie-Laure Delie
Substitutes:
MF	20	(France) Viviane Asseyi	(substituted on) 54'
MF	7	(France) Charlotte Bilbault	(substituted on) 90'
FW	18	(France) Marine Pervier	(substituted on) 68'
Manager:
(France) Sarah M'Barek

LYON:
GK	26	(France) Sarah Bouhaddi
RB	17	(France) Corine Franco
CB	20	(France) Sabrina Viguier
CB	3	(France) Wendie Renard
LB	18	(France) Sonia Bompastor (c)
DM	6	(France) Amandine Henry
CM	11	(Costa Rica) Shirley Cruz Traña
CM	23	(France) Camille Abily	(substituted off) 60'
LW	12	(France) Élodie Thomis	(substituted off) 75'
RW	21	(Switzerland) Lara Dickenmann	(substituted off) 60'
FW	8	(Sweden) Lotta Schelin
Substitutes:
MF	10	(France) Louisa Nécib	(substituted on) 60'
MF	14	(Brazil) Rosana	(substituted on) 75'
FW	9	(France) Eugénie Le Sommer	(substituted on) 60'
Manager:
(France) Patrice Lair

MATCH OFFICIALS

- Assistant referees:
  - Severine Craipeau
  - Cindy Gosselin
- Fourth official: Marie-Laure Taesch
- Chief Delegate: Didier de Mari

PLAYER OF THE MATCH

- Lotta Schelin

MATCH RULES

- 90 minutes.
- 30 minutes of extra-time if necessary.
- Penalty shoot-out if scores still level.
- Seven named substitutes.
- Maximum of three substitutions.
