= 2011 Challenge de France final =

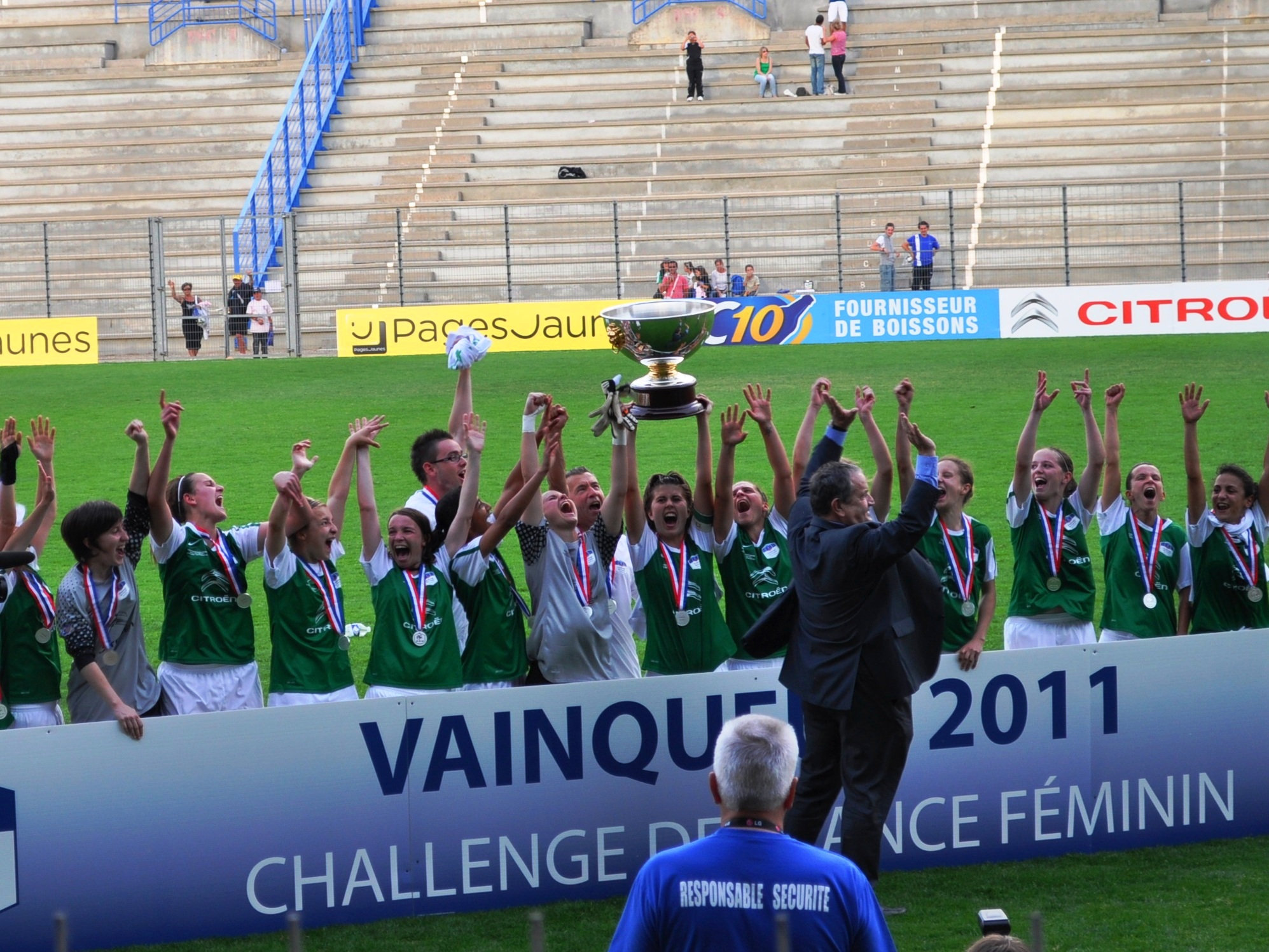
- Event: 2010–11 Challenge de France
| Saint-Étienne | Montpellier |
| D1 Féminine | D1 Féminine |
| 0 | 0 |
- Saint-Étienne win 3–2 on penalties.
- Date: 21 May 2011
- Venue: Stade de la Pépinière, Poitiers
- Referee: Stéphanie Frappart (Île-de-France)
- Weather: 20 °C (68 °F), Cloudy

The 2011 Challenge de France final was the 10th final of France's female football cup competition. The final took place on 21 May 2011 at the Stade de la Pépinière in Poitiers and was contested between D1 Féminine clubs Saint-Étienne and Montpellier. This was the last final under the Challenge de France name as the competition will be renamed to the Coupe de France Feminine for the 2011–12 season and onwards.

In the match, Saint-Étienne recorded a historic upset defeating Montpellier 3–2 on penalties after the match ended 0–0 in both regular time and extra time. The title is Saint-Étienne's first Challenge de France in the club's history and its first major honour since joining the AS Saint-Étienne in 2008.

== News ==
=== Team backgrounds ===
Saint-Étienne made its debut in the ultimate match of the competition. In its run-up to the final, the club faced only one first division club, Le Mans in the quarter-finals, and defeated the club 1–0. Saint-Étienne also did not concede a goal in the competition having shut out all of its opponents. Montpellier made its fifth appearance in the final of the Challenge de France, which is only second to Lyon, which has appeared in seven. Of its five appearances, Montpellier have won the Challenge de France three times; tied for the most titles ever won in the competition with Lyon. The club won its first titles in back-to-back seasons from 2006 to 2007 when it defeated Lyon two consecutive years on penalties. Montpellier won its last title in 2009. The club defeated Le Mans 3–1 in the final. The three-time champions only conceded one goal in the competition having outscored its opponents 22–1.

== Road to the final ==
| Saint-Étienne | | | Round | Montpellier |
|---|---|---|---|---|---|---|
| Opponent | H/A | Result | 2010–11 Challenge de France | Opponent | H/A | Result |
| Caluire | A | 5–0 | Second Round | Villeneuve-lès-Maguelone | A | 3–0 |
| Flacé Mâcon | H | 2–0 | Round of 32 | Arpajon | H | 9–0 |
| Saint-Simont | A | 1–0 | Round of 16 | Toulouse | A | 1–0 |
| Le Mans | H | 1–0 | Quarterfinals | La Roche-sur-Yon | H | 6–0 |
| Dijon | A | 5–0 | Semi-finals | Juvisy | A | 3–1 |

== Match ==
=== Match details ===
21 May
18:00 CEST

| Saint-Étienne | 0 – 0 | Montpellier |
|---|---|---|
| | Report |
Penalties
| (penalty missed) Catala; (penalty scored) Chazal; (penalty scored) Brevet; (penalty scored) Calmaron | 3–2 | (penalty missed) Torrent; (penalty missed) Bilbault; (penalty scored) Ramos; (penalty scored) Utsgui; (penalty missed) Lattaf |

Stade de la Pépinière, Poitiers
Referee: Stéphanie Frappart (Île-de-France)

| Saint-Étienne | Montpellier |

SAINT-ÉTIENNE:
| GK | 1 | (France) Méline Gérard |
| RB | 2 | (France) Ludivine Coulomb |
| CB | 4 | (France) Morgane Courteille |
| CB | 5 | (France) Astrid Chazal (c) |
| LB | 3 | (France) Ophélie Brevet |
| CM | 6 | (France) Aude Moreau |
| CM | 7 | (France) Charlotte Gauvin | (yellow card) 42' |
| RM | 10 | (France) Amélie Barbetta |
| LM | 9 | (France) Déborah Taghavi | | (substituted off) 63' |
| AM | 11 | (France) Kheira Hamraoui | | (substituted off) 76' |
| FW | 8 | (France) Camille Catala |
Substitutes:
| GK | 16 | (France) Julie Perrodin |
| FW | 12 | (France) Maéva Clemaron | | (substituted in) 76' |
| DF | 13 | (France) Juliette Benne |
| DF | 14 | (France) Amandine Soulard |
| MF | 15 | (Algeria) Safia Bengueddoudj | | (substituted in) 63' |
Manager:
(France) Hervé Didier

MONTPELLIER:
| GK | 1 | (France) Céline Deville |
| RB | 9 | (France) Marion Torrent | (yellow card) 82' |
| CB | 4 | (France) Ophélie Meilleroux |
| CB | 3 | (France) Kelly Gadéa |
| LB | 8 | (France) Cynthia Viana |
| CM | 6 | (France) Charlotte Bilbault |
| CM | 7 | (Japan) Rumi Utsugi |
| RW | 11 | (France) Ludivine Diguelman | | (substituted off) 62' |
| LW | 10 | (France) Viviane Asseyi | | (substituted off) 71' |
| FW | 5 | (France) Hoda Lattaf (c) | (yellow card) 82' |
| FW | 2 | (France) Marie-Laure Delie |
Substitutes:
| GK | 16 | (France) Laëtitia Philippe |
| MF | 12 | (Algeria) Nora Hamou Maamar |
| MF | 13 | (France) Stéphanie De Revière |
| DF | 14 | (France) Marine Pervier | | (substituted in) 63' |
| FW | 15 | (France) Elodie Ramos | | (substituted in) 71' |
Manager:
(France) Sarah M'Barek

MATCH OFFICIALS

- Assistant referees:
  - Lugdivine Cinquini (Méditerranée)
  - Emilie Mougeot (Franche-Comté)
- Fourth official: Nathalie Le Breton (Centre-Ouest)
- Chief Observer: Jean-Luc Rouinsard
- Chief Delegate: Marc Giraud

MAN OF THE MATCH

MATCH RULES

- 90 minutes.
- 30 minutes of extra-time if necessary.
- Penalty shoot-out if scores still level.
- Seven named substitutes.
- Maximum of three substitutions.
