= 2011–12 Division 1 Féminine =

Division 1 Féminine
- Season: 2011–12
- Champions: Lyon; 10th title
- Relegated: Hénin-Beaumont; Soyaux; Muret
- Champions League: Lyon; Juvisy
- Matches: 132
- Goals: 519 (3.93 per match)
- Top goalscorer: Lotta Schelin (20 goals)
- Biggest home win: Lyon 11–0 Muret (16 October 2011)
- Biggest away win: Vendenheim 0–10 Lyon (3 September 2011)
- Highest scoring: Lyon 11–0 Muret (16 October 2011)
- Longest winning run: 11 games Lyon (11 December – 2 June)
- Longest unbeaten run: 22 games Lyon (3 September – 2 June)
- Longest winless run: 20 games Muret (25 September – 2 June)
- Longest losing run: 9 games Muret (16 October – 15 January)
- Highest attendance: 12,263 – Guingamp 0–5 Lyon (8 October 2011)

The 2011–12 Division 1 Féminine season was the 38th since its establishment. Lyon are the defending champions. The league schedule was announced on 31 March 2011 and the fixtures were determined on 10 June. The season began on 3 September 2011 and ended on 2 June 2012. The winter break was in effect from 11 December 2011 to 7 January 2012.

== Teams ==
Location of teams in 2011–12 Division 1 Féminine

There will be three promoted teams from the Division 2 Féminine, the second level of women's football in France, replacing the three teams that were relegated from the Division 1 Féminine following the 2010–11 season. A total of 12 teams will compete in the league with three clubs suffering relegation to the second division, Division 1 Féminine.

La Roche-sur-Yon was the first club to suffer relegation from the first division to the Division 2 Féminine. The club's impending drop occurred on 17 May 2011 following the team's 6–1 defeat to Paris Saint-Germain. The negative result made it mathematically impossible for La Roche-sur-Yon to seize the ninth position in the table, which would have allowed the club to remain in the first division. On the final day of the league season, both Le Mans and Toulouse were relegated to the second division. Toulouse were relegated after losing 5–1 to the champions Lyon. Le Mans drew 0–0 with Saint Étienne, but were unable to pass Yzeure, whom it was equal on points with, in the standings due to goal difference.

Vendenheim was the first club from the Division 2 Féminine to earn a place in the first division after winning Group A of the league. Vendenheim won its group by a 20-point margin. Soyaux was the second club to earn its place in the first division after defeating ES Blanquefort 4–0 win two matches to spare in its group. Vendenheim will be making its return to the first division after two seasons in the second division, while Soyaux will be back in the first division after only one season in the league. AS Muret earned promotion to the first division with only one match to spare after Aulnat Sportif 3–0 at home. On 15 June 2011, the French Football Federation ruled against Muret's promotion due to the club's non-utilization of a youth academy. Second-place club FCF Monteux was subsequently inserted in Muret's place. A day after the announcement, Muret released a press release on its official website announcing its intent to appeal the ruling at the CNOSF, the National Sporting Committee of France which governs sport in France. On 18 July, the CNOSF ruled in favor of Muret allowing the club to retain its promotion to the Division 1 Féminine.

=== Guingamp and Stade Briochin merger ===
On 18 August 2011, the presidential hierarchy of men's professional club En Avant de Guingamp and women's club Stade Briochin announced that the clubs had reached an agreement on a merger, which will come into effect at the start of the 2011–12 season. Under the agreement, Stade Briochin will dissolve and play as the women's team of Guingamp. All other remnants of the club remain the same, such as its president, manager, and players.

Teams promoted to Division 1 Féminine

- Vendenheim
- Soyaux
- Muret

Teams relegated to Division 2 Féminine

- Le Mans
- Toulouse
- La Roche-sur-Yon

=== Stadia and locations ===
Club	Location	Venue	Capacity
Guingamp	Saint-Brieuc	Stade Fred Aubert	13,500
Hénin-Beaumont	Hénin-Beaumont	Stade Octave Birembaut	3,000
Juvisy	Viry-Châtillon	Stade Georges Maquin	2,000
Lyon	Lyon	Plaine des Jeux de Gerland	2,500
Montpellier	Villeneuve-lès-Maguelone	Stade Joseph Blanc	1,000
Muret	Muret	Stade Clément Ader	1,800
Paris Saint-Germain	Paris	Stade Georges Lefèvre	3,500
Rodez	Rodez	Stade de Vabre	400
Saint-Étienne	Saint-Étienne	Stade Léon Nautin	1,000
Soyaux	Soyaux	Stade Léo Lagrange	400
Vendenheim	Vendenheim	Stade Waldeck	2,000
Yzeure	Yzeure	Stade de Bellevue	2,135

=== Personnel and kits ===
Team	Manager^{1}	Captain^{1}	Kit Manufacturer^{1}	Shirt Sponsor^{1}
Guingamp	(France) Adolphe Ogouyon	(France) Julie Morel	Adidas	
Hénin-Beaumont	(France) Yannick Ansart	(France) Rachel Saïdi	Adidas	
Juvisy	(France) Sandrine Mathivet	(France) Sandrine Soubeyrand	Errea	
Lyon	(France) Patrice Lair	(France) Laura Georges	Adidas	Leroy Merlin
Montpellier	(France) Sarah M'Barek	(France) Ophélie Meilleroux	Nike	Groupe Nicollin
Muret	(France) Madjid Alliche	(France) Anne Trevisan		
Paris Saint-Germain	(France) Camille Vaz	(France) Sabrina Delannoy	Nike	Emirates
Rodez	(France) Franck Plenecassagne	(France) Agathe Calvié	Duarig	
Saint-Étienne	(France) Hervé Didier	(France) Astrid Chazal	Adidas	Winamax Poker
Soyaux	(France) Corinne Diacre	(France) Siga Tandia		
Vendenheim	(France) Dominique Steinberger	(France) Jennifer Meyer		
Yzeure	(France) Patrice De Gironde	(France) Faustine Roux	Adidas	

^{1} Subject to change prior to start of the season.

== League table ==
Note: A win in D1 Féminine is worth 4 points, with 2 points for a draw and 1 for a defeat.

Pos	Team	Pld	W	D	L	GF	GA	GD	Pts	Qualification or relegation
1	Lyon (C, Q)	22	19	3	0	119	3	+116	82	Qualification for Women's Champions League
2	Juvisy (Q)	22	18	2	2	62	21	+41	78	Qualification for Women's Champions League
3	Montpellier	22	17	3	2	74	17	+57	76	
4	Paris Saint-Germain	22	13	5	4	48	23	+25	66	
5	Saint-Étienne	22	8	4	10	33	38	−5	50	
6	Guingamp	22	7	5	10	25	48	−23	48	
7	Vendenheim	22	7	4	11	39	68	−29	47	
8	Rodez	22	7	3	12	29	40	−11	46	
9	Yzeure	22	5	8	9	31	50	−19	45	
10	Hénin-Beaumont (R)	22	6	4	12	27	72	−45	44	Relegation to Division 2 Féminine
11	Soyaux (R)	22	2	0	20	19	69	−50	28	Relegation to Division 2 Féminine
12	Muret (R)	22	1	3	18	14	71	−57	28	Relegation to Division 2 Féminine

Source: French Football Federation
Rules for classification: 1st points; 2nd head-to-head goal difference; 3rd total goal difference
(C) Champions; (Q) Qualified for the phase indicated; (R) Relegated

== Results ==
Home \ Away	GUI	HEB	JUV	LYO	MON	MUR	PSG	ROD	SET	SOY	VEN	YZE
Guingamp		1–1	0–3	0–5	0–3	2–1	0–0	2–1	0–0	4–3	3–2	2–2
Hénin-Beaumont	6–0		0–9	1–6	0–6	1–1	0–4	3–1	1–0	0–4	4–2	1–1
Juvisy	2–0	5–2		0–3	2–1	4–0	1–0	4–2	1–0	5–0	6–3	2–1
Lyon	7–0	9–0	1–1		1–0	11–0	3–0	7–0	7–0	6–0	10–0	8–0
Montpellier	4–2	5–1	0–0	1–1		8–0	4–2	1–0	4–0	4–3	5–0	4–0
Muret	0–3	2–3	0–3	0–3	0–4		1–5	0–1	0–5	1–2	1–2	1–1
Paris Saint-Germain	2–0	2–0	1–3	0–0	1–1	3–0		2–0	3–2	2–0	4–1	5–2
Rodez	0–1	3–1	1–2	0–4	1–2	3–2	1–1		1–0	2–0	3–3	0–1
Saint-Étienne	1–1	3–0	4–1	0–3	1–6	3–1	1–2	2–2		1–0	0–0	1–0
Soyaux	1–4	0–1	0–2	0–8	0–6	0–1	1–2	0–5	0–4		1–2	2–4
Vendenheim	2–0	7–0	1–3	0–10	1–3	3–1	0–4	2–1	1–3	2–1		3–3
Yzeure	2–0	1–1	1–3	0–6	1–2	1–1	2–2	0–1	4–2	2–1	2–2	

Updated to match(es) played on 2 June 2012. Source: French Football Federation
Legend: Blue = home team win; Yellow = draw; Red = away team win.

== Statistics ==
=== Top goalscorers ===
Rank	Player	Club	Goals
1	(France) Eugénie Le Sommer	Lyon	22
2	(Sweden) Lotta Schelin	Lyon	20
3	(France) Camille Abily	Lyon	15
3	(France) Élodie Thomis	Lyon	15
5	(France) Gaëtane Thiney	Juvisy	14
6	(France) Camille Catala	Saint-Étienne	13
6	(France) Hoda Lattaf	Montpellier	13
8	(France) Marie-Laure Delie	Montpellier	12
9	(France) Anaïs Ribeyra	Yzeure	11
10	3 players		10

Last updated: 3 June 2012
Source: Official Goalscorers' Standings

=== Hat-tricks ===
Player	For	Against	Result	Date
(France) Eugénie Le Sommer	Lyon	Vendenheim	0–10	3 September 2011
(France) Élodie Thomis	Lyon	Vendenheim	0–10	3 September 2011
(France) Gaëtane Thiney	Juvisy	Soyaux	5–0	4 September 2011
(Sweden) Lotta Schelin	Lyon	Hénin-Beaumont	9–0	11 September 2011
(France) Julie Machart^{4}	Juvisy	Hénin-Beaumont	0–9	25 September 2011
(Sweden) Lotta Schelin^{4}	Lyon	Saint-Étienne	7–0	1 October 2011
(France) Camille Abily	Lyon	Guingamp	0–5	8 October 2011
(France) Eugénie Le Sommer	Lyon	Muret	11–0	16 October 2011
(France) Camille Abily	Lyon	Rodez	7–0	6 November 2011
(France) Louisa Nécib	Lyon	Yzeure	0–6	13 November 2011
(France) Laëtitia Tonazzi	Juvisy	Hénin-Beaumont	5–2	8 January 2012
(France) Camille Catala	Saint-Étienne	Soyaux	0–4	15 April 2012

- ^{4} Player scored 4 goals

=== Scoring ===
- First goal of the season: Lotta Schelin for Lyon against Vendenheim (3 September 2011)
- First own goal of the season: Noémie Freckhaus (Vendenheim) for Soyaux (25 September 2011)
- Widest winning margin: 11 goals
  - Lyon 11–0 Muret (16 October 2011)
- Highest scoring game: 11 goals
  - Lyon 11–0 Muret (16 October 2011)
- Most goals scored in a match by a single team: 11 goals
  - Lyon 11–0 Muret (16 October 2011)

=== Discipline ===
- Worst overall disciplinary record (1 pt per yellow card, 3 pts per red card): 28 points
  - Vendenheim (22 yellow & 2 red cards)
- Best overall disciplinary record: 6 points
  - Lyon (6 yellow & 0 red cards)
- Most yellow cards (club): 25
  - Yzeure
- Most yellow cards (player): 5
  - Faustine Roux (Yzeure)
- Most red cards (club): 2
  - Muret
  - Vendenheim
- Most red cards (player): 1
  - Nora Hamou Maamar (Montpellier)
  - Kadidia Diawara (Vendenheim)
  - Caroline La Villa (Saint-Étienne)
  - Julia Dany (Muret)
  - Marine Fromantin (Muret)
  - Noémie Sturm (Vendenheim)

== Notable transfers ==
Paris Saint-Germain opened the transfer campaign by signing Rodez star Kenza Dali. The club later raided Rodez again, this time for French women's international Delphine Blanc, while also signing youth international Solène Barbance from Toulouse. Rodez later acquired Paris Saint-Germian striker Zohra Ayachi. In September 2011, in an effort to replace Ayachi, Paris Saint-Germain recruited American striker Allie Long. The defending champions Lyon made three signings. After losing Ingvild Stensland and backup goalkeeper Véronique Pons, manager Patrice Lair replaced the two with 18-year-old French youth international midfielder Makan Traoré and French senior international goalkeeper Céline Deville. In September 2011, Lyon signed Brazilian international Rosana. After winning the final edition of the Challenge de France last season, in an effort to establish themselves as league contenders, Saint-Étienne signed eight new players while also keeping the club's core players intact. Notables signing for the club include youth internationals Rose Lavaud and Charlotte Lorgeré, both of whom were signed from Toulouse who were relegated to the second division last season.

Other notable signings during the transfer window include Montpellier signing Japanese international and 2011 FIFA Women's World Cup champion Aya Sameshima, Yzeure signing former La Roche-sur-Yon captain Claire Guillard, Juvisy acquiring both goalkeeper Morgan Mancion and defender Julie Debever from Hénin-Beaumont, Rodez signing senior international goalkeeper Karima Benameur, and newly promoted Soyaux raiding third division club Arlac Mérignac for three players; 17-year-old striker Eva Sumo, starting goalkeeper Audrey Souletis, and Fidélia Poussil. Poussil had led Arlac Mérignac in goals during the 2010–11 Division 2 Féminine season as the club ultimately were relegated.
