= 2010–11 Challenge de France =

Tournament details
- Country: France
- Teams: 387

Final positions
- Champions: Saint-Étienne
- Runners-up: Montpellier

The 2010–11 Challenge de France is the tenth season of the French cup competition for women. The defending champions are Paris Saint-Germain who defeated Montpellier 5–0 in the 2009–10 edition of the competition. The competition is organized by the French Football Federation and is open to all women's French football clubs in France. The final will be held on 21 May 2011 at Stade de la Pépinière in Poitiers. This will be the last season of the competition under the Challenge de France name as the cup will be renamed to the Coupe de France Feminine for the 2011–12 season and onwards.

== Calendar ==
On 15 August 2010, the French Football Federation announced the calendar for the Challenge de France.

Round	First match date	Fixtures	Clubs	Notes
Regional finals	12 December 2010			
First Round	9 January 2011			Clubs participating in D2 Féminine gain entry.
Second Round	30 January 2011			
Round of 32	20 February 2011	16	32 → 16	Clubs participating in D1 Féminine gain entry.
Round of 16	13 March 2011	8	16 → 8	
Quarter-finals	3 April 2011	4	8 → 4	
Semi-finals	1 May 2011	2	4 → 2	
Final	21 May 2011	1	2 → 1	

== First round ==
The draw for the first round of the Challenge de France was held on 16 December 2010 at the headquarters of the French Football Federation in Paris. The draw was conducted by current French women's international and Paris Saint-Germain midfielder Élise Bussaglia. The matches were played on 9 January 2011. The canceled will be played on 16 January.

Tie no	Home team	Score	Away team
1	Saint-Avold	1–9	Vendenheim
2	Chèvremont	0–8	Mars Bischheim
3	Valentigney	1–2	Mussig
4	Masevaux	1–4	Algrange
5	Guemar	0–3	Woippy
6	Rossfeld	0–0 (a.e.t); 3–4 pen.	Monswiller
7	Ville d'Évry	1–0	Stade Auxerre
8	Saint-Maur	0–2	Montigny-le-Bretonneux
9	Saint-Denis	1–2	Compiègne Oise
10	Dijon	2–0	Bagneux
11	Rochette Vaux	1–1 (a.e.t); 3–4 pen.	Val d'Orge
12	Saint-Memmie	3–0	Chauny
13	Cannes Bocca	2–3	Saint-Cyprien
14	Grenoble	2–4	Gardanne
15	Provence	0–5	Monteux
16	Nîmes Métropole	2–1	La Véore
17	Celtic Marseille	1–1 (a.e.t); 2–4 pen.	Villeneuve-Lès-Maguelone
18	Cannet Rocheville	1–4	Claix
19	Lafrançaise	1–2	Isle
20	Gandalou	2–2 (a.e.t); 3–4 pen.	Mérignac Arlac
21	Albi	3–1	Blanquefort
22	Preignan	11–0	Pessac Alouette
23	Limoges Landouge	0–5	Muret
24	Saint-Simont	5–0	Grayan Médoc
25	Chitenay-Celettes	0–10	Saint-Herblain
26	Sainte-Luce	0–2	Verchers Saint-Georges

Tie no	Home team	Score	Away team
27	Saint-Sauveur	0–11	Tours
28	Vineuil Brion	0–5	Soyaux
29	Orléans	1–7	Poitiers 3 Cités
30	Couffe Conquérante	0–4	Corné
31	Quimper	1–4	Croix-Blanche Angers
32	Saint-Malo	2–1	Condé-sur-Noireau
33	Saint-Brice Stéphanais	0–6	Ploermel
34	Janze	2–5	La Flèche
35	Laval	2–1	Avant Caen
36	Rennes Bréquigny	4–1	Cormelles
37	Amiens Montières	2–1	Pont-de-l'Arche
38	Saint-Olle	3–4	Raismes
39	Leers	2–2 (a.e.t); 4–2 pen.	Arras
40	Issy-les-Moulineaux	2–1	Gravelines
41	Seizième	2–0	Rouen
42	Neuville	0–9	Herblay
43	Iris Lambersart	0–2	Templemars Vendeville
44	Domont	1–2	Rouvroy
45	Plaine Revermont	1–1 (a.e.t); 3–5 pen.	Chatenoy Royal
46	Mieussy	0–9	Arpajon
47	Nivolas	1–3	Flacé Mâcon
48	Arbois	1–1 (a.e.t); 5–4 pen.	Le Puy
49	Montmerle	2–3	Besançon
50	Andrézieux	1–1 (a.e.t); 3–4 pen.	Aulnat
51	Dommartin Tour	0–5	Blanzy
52	Caluire	5–0	Saint-Julien Chapteuil

== Second round ==
The draw for the second round of the Challenge de France was held on 12 January 2011 at the headquarters of the French Football Federation in Paris. The draw was conducted by former French women's international Sandrine Roux. The matches were played on 29–30 January 2011. The canceled match between Val d'Orge–Saint-Malo was played on 6 February.

Tie no	Home team	Score	Away team
1	Rouvroy	2–0	Raismes
2	Amiens Montières	0–3	Montigny-le-Bretonneux
3	Issy-les-Moulineaux	0–10	Paris Saint-Germain
4	Herblay	2–0	Templemars Vendeville
5	Hénin-Beaumont	6–0	Leers
6	Saint-Memmie	1–3	Compiègne Oise
7	Caluire	0–5	Saint-Étienne
8	Monteux	0–7	Lyon
9	Gardanne	1–2	Nîmes Métropole
10	Claix	4–0	Chatenoy Royal
11	Villeneuve-Lès-Maguelone	0–3	Montpellier
12	Saint-Cyprien	1–2	Flacé Mâcon
13	Soyaux	0–1	Rodez
14	Saint-Simont	3–1	Mérignac Arlac
15	Arpajon	2–1	Muret
16	Poitiers 3 Cités	1–0	Aulnat
17	Albi	2–2 (a.e.t); 4–5 pen.	Toulouse

Tie no	Home team	Score	Away team
18	Isle	1–4	Preignan
19	Arbois	0–11	Vendenheim
20	Monswiller	0–4	Mars Bischheim
21	Seizième	0–1	Dijon
22	Algrange	0–5	Juvisy
23	Mussig	0–8	Besançon
24	Woippy	1–1 (a.e.t); 3–2 pen.	Blanzy
25	Ville d'Évry	0–4	Yzeure Allier
26	Ploermel	1–2	La Roche-sur-Yon
27	Stade Briochin	1–2	Rennes Bréquigny
28	La Flèche	0–13	Croix-Blanche Angers
29	Tours	0–5	Le Mans
30	Val d'Orge	1–2	Saint-Malo
31	Verchers Saint-Georges	2–2 (a.e.t); 3–1 pen.	Condé-sur-Noireau
32	Saint Herblain	2–0	Corné

== Round of 32 ==
The draw for the Round of 32 of the Challenge de France was held on 2 February 2011 at the headquarters of the French Football Federation. The draw was conducted the president of the Ligue du Football Amateur (LFA) Bernard Barbet. The matches will be played on 20–21 February.

Tie no	Home team	Score	Away team
1	Rodez	3–1	Claix
2	Nîmes Métropole	0–0 (a.e.t); 1–4 pen.	Toulouse
3	Montpellier	9–0	Arpajon
4	Preignan	0–4	Saint-Simont
5	Le Mans	3–1	Croix-Blanche Angers
6	Rennes Bréquigny	2–3	Saint Herblain
7	Saint-Malo	0–1	Verchers Saint-Georges
8	Poitiers 3 Cités	0–2	La Roche-sur-Yon

Tie no	Home team	Score	Away team
9	Herblay	1–4	Yzeure Allier
10	Saint-Étienne	2–0	Flacé Mâcon
11	Dijon	2–0	Besançon
12	Lyon	13–0	Montigny-le-Bretonneux
13	Rouvroy	0–4	Hénin-Beaumont
14	Vendenheim	1–0	Paris Saint-Germain
15	Compiègne Oise	2–0	Mars Bischheim
16	Woippy	1–9	Juvisy

== Round of 16 ==
The draw for the Round of 16 of the Challenge de France was held on 23 February 2011 at the headquarters of the French Football Federation in Paris. The draw was conducted by the current coach of the French women's national team Bruno Bini. The matches were played on 13 March.

Tie no	Home team	Score	Away team
1	Toulouse	0–1	Montpellier
2	Vendenheim	0–0 (a.e.t); 5–6 pen.	Dijon
3	Saint-Simont	0–1	Saint-Étienne
4	Lyon	3–0	Rodez

Tie no	Home team	Score	Away team
5	La Roche-sur-Yon	1–1 (a.e.t); 4–2 pen.	Compiègne Oise
6	Saint Herblain	0–5	Juvisy
7	Hénin-Beaumont	0–1	Le Mans
8	Verchers Saint-Georges	3–0	Yzeure Allier

== Quarterfinals ==
The draw for the quarterfinals of the Challenge de France was held on 16 March 2011 at the headquarters of the French Football Federation in Paris. The draw was conducted by Henri Emile, the team coordinator of the France national team. The matches were played on 3 April.

3 April	Juvisy	0–0 (3–2 p)	Lyon	Stade Georges Maquin, Viry-Châtillon
15:00 CET		Report		Referee: Élodie Coppola

3 April	Verchers Saint-Georges	1–3	Dijon	Stade des Petites Rivières, Les Verchers-sur-Layon
15:00 CET	Bonnin 16'	Report	Paulin 28'; Rabut 37'; Hakkar 48'	Referee: Nathalie Le Breton

3 April	Montpellier	6–0	La Roche-sur-Yon	Stade Jules Rimet, Sussargues
15:00 CET	Lattaf 33', 66', 79', 89'; Ramos 40', 50'	Report		Referee: Solenne Bartnik

3 April	Saint-Étienne	1–0	Le Mans	Stade Léon Nautin, Saint-Étienne
15:00 CET	Taghavi 74'	Report		Referee: Nathalie Mittelbronn

== Semi-finals ==
The draw for the semi-finals of the Challenge de France was held on 16 March 2011 at the headquarters of the French Football Federation in Paris. The draw was conducted by Henri Emile, the team coordinator of the France national team. The matches will be played on 1 May.

1 May	Dijon	0–5	Saint-Étienne	Stade des Poussots, Dijon
15:00 CET		Report	Catala 20', 45', 61', 67'; Clemaron 70'	Referee: Dorothée Ily (Languedoc-Roussillon)

1 May	Juvisy	1–3	Montpellier	Stade Georges Maquin, Viry-Châtillon
15:00 CET	Tonazzi 2'	Report	Gadéa 26'; Diguelman 39', 67' (pen.)	Referee: Severine Zinck (Alsace)

== Final ==
21 May
18:00 CEST

Saint-Étienne	0 – 0	Montpellier
	Report
Penalties
(penalty missed) Catala; (penalty scored) Chazal; (penalty scored) Brevet; (penalty scored) Calmaron	3–2	(penalty missed) Torrent; (penalty missed) Bilbault; (penalty scored) Ramos; (penalty scored) Utsgui; (penalty missed) Lattaf

Stade de la Pépinière, Poitiers
Referee: Stéphanie Frappart (Île-de-France)
