= Corine Franco =

French footballer (born 1983)

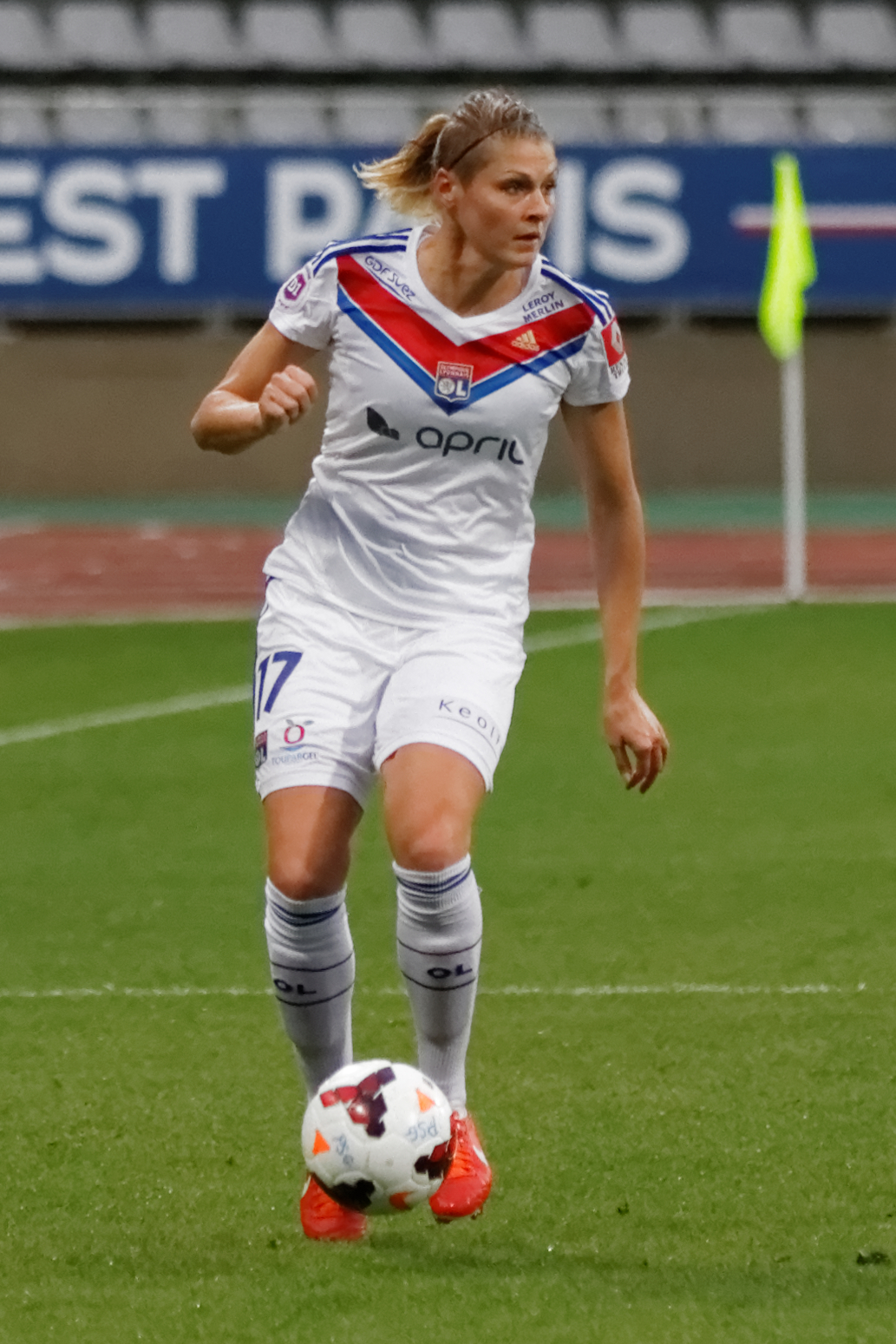
- Corine Franco with Lyon in 2013

Personal information
- Birth name: Corine Cécile Petit
- Date of birth: 5 October 1983 (age 43)
- Place of birth: La Rochelle, France
- Height: 5 ft 10 in (1.78 m)
- Positions: Right back; defensive midfielder

Youth career
- 1992–1998: Avenir Maritime Laleu
- 1998–2001: ES Rochellaise
- 2001–2002: Soyaux

Senior career*
Years	Team	Apps	(Gls)
2002–2008	Soyaux	125	(51)
2008–2018	Lyon	121	(14)

International career^{‡}
2006	France U21	4	(0)
2003–2014	France	89	(11)
- * Club domestic league appearances and goals as of 7 June 2016 (UTC) ‡ National team caps and goals as of 7 March 2014 (UTC)

Corine Cécile Franco (née Petit) (born 5 October 1983) is a retired French football player who is best known for having played for France and Olympique Lyonnais of the Division 1 Féminine. Franco served as vice-captain of the French club and played as a physical, yet creative defensive midfielder, often acting as a deep-lying playmaker. She was often utilized as a right back at international level.

Franco is one of the most decorated players at club level in women's professional football, having won five European Cups and 10 Division 1 Féminine trophies.

She competed for France at the 2012 Summer Olympics.

== Club career ==
=== Early career ===
Franco was born on the west coast of France and began her career playing for Avenir Maritime Laleu in her hometown. She later moved to ES Rochellaise before securing a move to D1 Féminine club ASJ Soyaux at the start of the millennium. Franco spent two years in the youth system before making her league debut during the 2002–03 season. In her debut season, she scored four goals. The 2003–04 season saw Franco's opportunities in the team increase as she was given a permanent role in the starting eleven. Over the next four seasons, she appeared in all 22 matches scoring double-digit goals on two occasions. In her final season with Soyaux, she appeared in 19 matches scoring seven goals. Her successful seven-year career gained the attention of defending champions Olympique Lyonnais and Franco eventually secured a move to the club.

=== Lyon ===
In Franco's first season with Lyon, she appeared in 19 matches, starting 17, and scored two goals en route to Lyon winning their second straight D1 Féminine title and Franco's first of her career. The 2008–09 season also gave Franco the opportunity to display her talents on the European stage as Lyon were participating in the 2008–09 UEFA Women's Cup. Lyon cruised through the group stage portion of the tournament and in the knockout rounds, they faced Italian club A.S.D. CF Bardolino. Lyon won the tie 9–1 on aggregate as Franco scoring a goal in both legs. Lyon eventually suffered elimination in the semi-finals to German club FCR 2001 Duisburg.

On 15 October 2010, it was confirmed by Lyon officials that Franco suffered a rupture of her anterior cruciate ligament, as well as her medial meniscus and lateral meniscus in her right knee. She suffered the injury while playing in a UEFA Women's Champions League match against AZ Alkmaar. Franco missed six months.

She retired at the end of the 2017—2018 football season, after having won the domestic league and Champions League titles with Lyon.

== International career ==
Franco made her international debut on 22 February 2003 in a 2–1 loss to China. She scored her first international goal three days later in a 2–1 victory over the Netherlands. During qualification for the UEFA Euro 2009, she scored one goal against Greece. In the tournament, she appeared in all 4 matches France contested. France reached as far as the quarterfinals losing to the Netherlands 4–5 on penalties with Franco missing her penalty shot. On 23 September 2009, she scored a brace against Serbia in a 2011 FIFA World Cup qualification match. France won the match 7–0. A month later, she scored a goal in another qualification match, this time against Estonia in a 12–0 victory.

Franco made her last international appearance in 2–3 win over Australia on 7 March 2014.

== Career statistics ==
=== Club ===
Statistics accurate as of match played 8 June 2016

Club	Season	League		Cup		Continental		Total	
Club	Season	Apps	Goals	Apps	Goals	Apps	Goals	Apps	Goals
Soyaux	2002–03	18	4	0	0	0	0	18	4
Soyaux	2003–04	22	13	0	0	0	0	22	13
Soyaux	2004–05	22	8	0	0	0	0	22	8
Soyaux	2005–06	22	12	0	0	0	0	22	12
Soyaux	2006–07	22	7	0	0	0	0	22	7
Soyaux	2007–08	19	7	4	2	0	0	23	9
Soyaux	Total	125	51	4	2	0	0	129	53
Lyon	2008–09	19	2	3	1	6	2	28	5
Lyon	2009–10	21	2	4	0	9	1	34	3
Lyon	2010–11	5	0	0	0	2	0	7	0
Lyon	2011–12	16	2	4	1	8	1	28	4
Lyon	2012–13	17	4	5	1	5	0	27	5
Lyon	2013–14	15	1	6	3	2	0	23	4
Lyon	2014–15	17	0	3	1	6	1	26	2
Lyon	2015–16	11	3	3	1	4	0	18	4
Lyon	Total	121	14	32	7	38	6	181	27
Career total		246	62	36	9	38	6	310	78

=== International ===
(Correct as of 7 March 2014)

National team	Season	Apps	Goals
France	2002–03	3	1
France	2003–04	1	0
France	2004–05	0	0
France	2005–06	0	0
France	2006–07	7	0
France	2007–08	6	1
France	2008–09	10	2
France	2009–10	14	4
France	2010–11	8	0
France	2011–12	22	2
France	2012–13	13	0
France	2013–14	1	0
Total		89	11

==== International goals ====
#	Date	Venue	Opponent	Score	Result	Competition
1	25 February 2003	Stade Municipal de Albi, Albi, France	Netherlands	1–0	2–1	Friendly
2	23 April 2008	Yiannis Pathiakakis Stadium, Ano Liossia, Greece	Greece	0–4	0–5	UEFA Women's Euro 2009 qualifying
3	7 March 2009	Tasos Markou Stadium, Paralimni, Cyprus	England	0–1	2–2	2009 Cyprus Cup
4	10 March 2009	Makario Stadium, Nicosia, Cyprus	South Africa	3–1	3–2	2009 Cyprus Cup
5	23 September 2009	Stadion NK Inter Zaprešić, Zaprešić, Croatia	Croatia	0–2	0–7	2011 FIFA Women's World Cup qualification
6	23 September 2009	Stadion NK Inter Zaprešić, Zaprešić, Croatia	Croatia	0–4	0–7	2011 FIFA Women's World Cup qualification
7	28 October 2009	Stade Jules Deschaseaux, Le Havre, France	Estonia	5–0	12–0	2011 FIFA Women's World Cup qualification
8	27 March 2010	Stade de la Libération, Boulogne-sur-Mer, France	Northern Ireland	1–0	6–0	2011 FIFA Women's World Cup qualification
9	14 September 2011	Ness Ziona Stadium, Ness Ziona, Israel	Israel	2–0	5–0	UEFA Women's Euro 2013 qualifying
10	4 July 2012	Stade de la Source, Orléans, France	Romania	5–0	6–0	Friendly
11	29 November 2012	Erdgas Sportpark, Halle, Germany	Germany	1–1	1–1	Friendly

== Honours ==
=== Club ===
Lyon

- Division 1 Féminine: 2008–09, 2009–10, 2010–11, 2011–12, 2012–13, 2013–14, 2014–15, 2015–16, 2016–2017, 2017–2018
- Coupe de France Féminine: 2011–12, 2012–13, 2013–14, 2014–15, 2015–16
- UEFA Women's Champions League: 2010–11, 2011–12, 2015–16, 2016–17, 2017–18

=== International ===
France

- Cyprus Cup: Winner 2012
