= Céline Deville =

French footballer (born 1982)

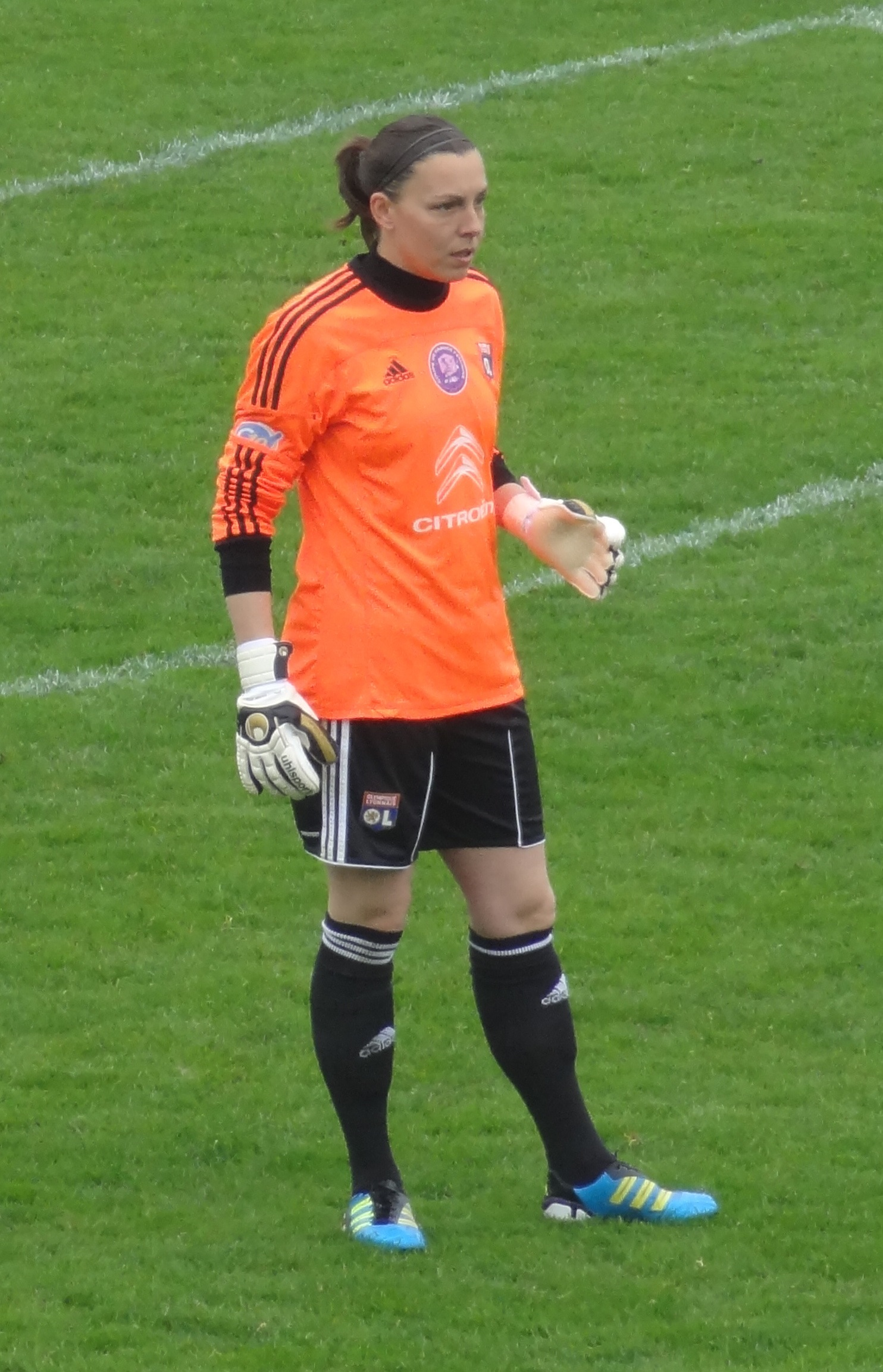
- Deville with Lyon

Personal information
- Full name: Céline Nadine Sabine Deville
- Date of birth: 24 January 1982 (age 44)
- Place of birth: Berck-sur-Mer, France
- Height: 1.73 m (5 ft 8 in)
- Position: Goalkeeper

Team information
- Current team: Paris FC
- Number: 1

Youth career
- 1995–2000: UO Albertville
- 2000–2002: Paris Saint-Germain

Senior career*
Years	Team	Apps	(Gls)
2002–2011	Montpellier	136	(0)
2011–2013	Olympique Lyon	7	(0)
2013–2018	Paris FC	54	(0)

International career^{‡}
2001	France U18	3	(0)
2002–	France	65	(0)
- * Club domestic league appearances and goals as of 16 September 2016 (UTC) ‡ National team caps and goals as of 16 September 2016 (UTC)

Céline Nadine Sabine Deville (born 24 January 1982) is a French football player who has played as goalkeeper for Montpellier and various other top French clubs. Deville has also played for the senior women's national team having made her debut on 9 April 2002 in a friendly match against Australia.

== Career statistics ==
Updated 1 September 2016

Club	Season	League		Cup		Continental		Total	
Club	Season	Apps	Goals	Apps	Goals	Apps	Goals	Apps	Goals
Montpellier	2002–03	3	0	0	0	0	0	3	0
Montpellier	2003–04	19	0	0	0	0	0	19	0
Montpellier	2004–05	19	0	0	0	4	0	23	0
Montpellier	2005–06	17	0	1	0	10	0	28	0
Montpellier	2006–07	16	0	1	0	0	0	17	0
Montpellier	2007–08	17	0	2	0	0	0	19	0
Montpellier	2008–09	20	0	2	0	0	0	22	0
Montpellier	2009–10	13	0	4	0	8	0	25	0
Montpellier	2010–11	12	0	4	0	0	0	16	0
Montpellier	Total	136	0	14	0	22	0	172	0
Lyon	2011–12	4	0	3	0	2	0	9	0
Lyon	2012–13	3	0	2	0	1	0	6	0
Lyon	Total	7	0	5	0	3	0	15	0
Juvisy	2013–14	21	0	2	0	–	–	23	0
Juvisy	2014–15	22	0	4	0	–	–	26	0
Juvisy	2015–16	10	0	3	0	–	–	13	0
Juvisy	Total	53	0	9	0	–	–	62	0
Career total		196	0	28	0	25	0	249	0

== Honours ==
=== Official ===
- Division 1 Féminine (Champions of France) (level 1)

Winners (4): 2003–04, 2004–05, 2011–12, 2012–13

- Challenge de France

Winners (5): 2006, 2007, 2009, 2012, 2013

- UEFA Women's Champions League: Winner 2011–12

=== Invitational ===
- Pyrénées Cup

Winners (2): 2008, 2010
