= Camille Catala =

French footballer (born 1991)

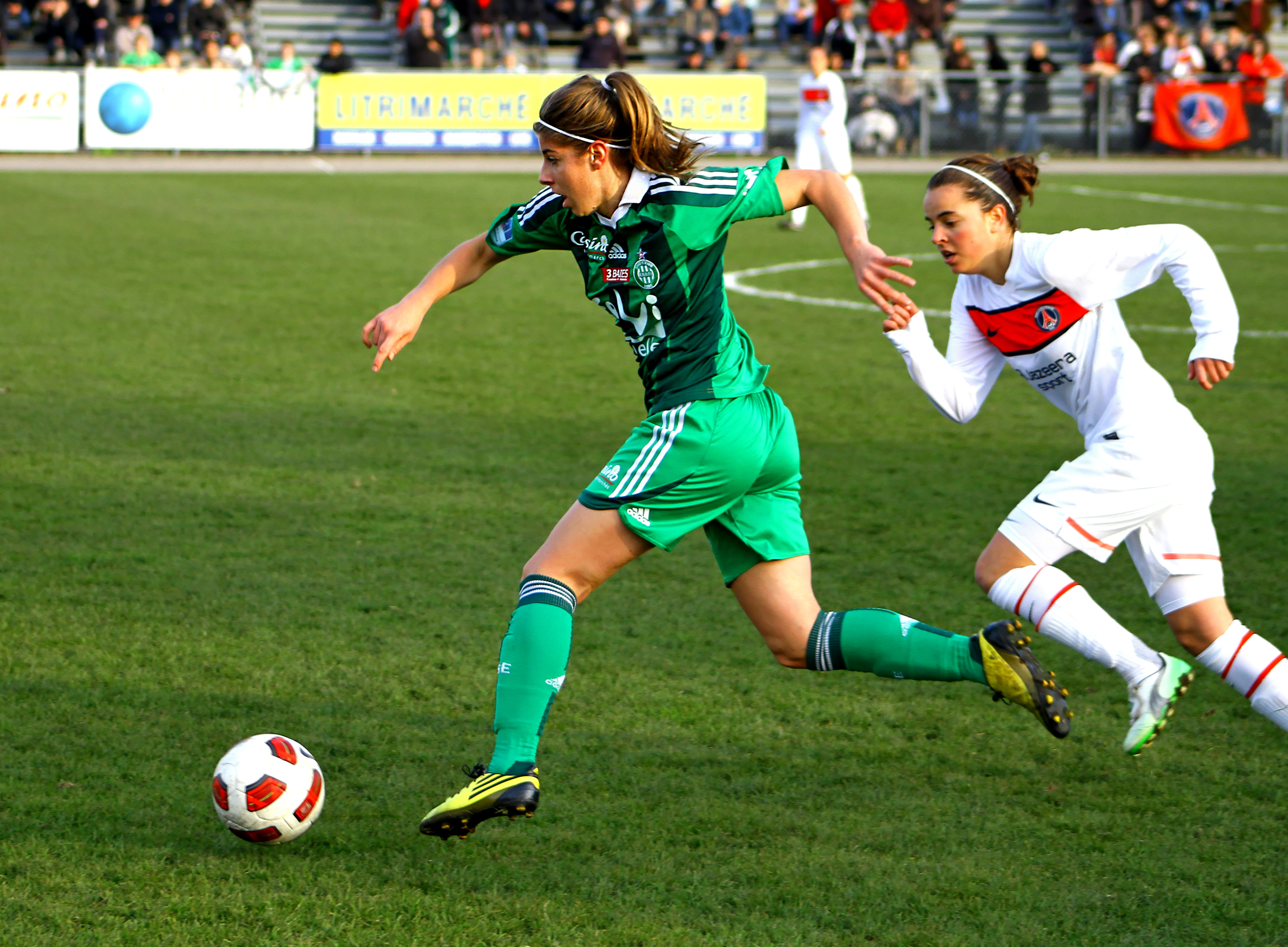
- Catala playing for Saint-Étienne against PSG

Personal information
- Full name: Camille Catala
- Date of birth: 6 May 1991 (age 35)
- Place of birth: Montpellier, France
- Height: 1.68 m (5 ft 6 in)
- Position: Striker

Youth career
- 2005–2008: Saint-Christol-lès-Alès

Senior career*
Years	Team	Apps	(Gls)
2008–2012	Saint-Étienne	81	(26)
2012–2021	Paris FC	150	(55)

International career^{‡}
2008	France U17	3	(1)
2009–2010	France U19	19	(4)
2010	France U20	3	(0)
2011–2017	France	31	(3)
- * Club domestic league appearances and goals as of 16 September 2016 ‡ National team caps and goals as of 20 June 2018

Camille Catala (born 6 May 1991) is a French footballer. Catala plays as a striker and has been active with the France women's national football team on the youth circuit. In 2010, she played on the under-19 team that won the 2010 UEFA Women's Under-19 Championship.

== Career ==
=== Saint-Étienne ===
Catala began her career at Saint-Christol-lès-Alès. With the club, she made an appearance in a Challenge de France match before departing for Racing Club de Saint-Étienne, where she was inserted as a starter upon arrival. In her first season with the club, she appeared in 15 matches scoring only one goal, which came on 10 May 2009 in a 2–2 draw with Nord Allier Yzeure. The following season saw RC Saint-Étienne merge with Ligue 1 club AS Saint-Étienne to form the club's women's section. Catala again entered the season as a starter scoring her first goal of the season in her club's 1–4 loss to Nord Allier Yzeure.

=== Juvisy ===
In June 2012, it was announced that Catala would be joining Juvisy.

=== International ===
Catala has been active with the women's section of the national team. She has earned caps with the women's under-17 and under-19 teams. With the under-17 team, she participated in both the 2008 UEFA Women's Under-17 Championship and the inaugural 2008 FIFA U-17 Women's World Cup, where France were eliminated in the group stage. Catala's only goal in the World Cup came in France's 6–2 thrashing of Paraguay. With the under-19s, Catala played in the La Manga Cup international tournament and the 2009 UEFA Women's Under-19 Championship reached the semi-finals before bowing out to Sweden in extra time. She appeared for France at the 2012 Summer Olympics.

== Career statistics ==
=== Club ===
Statistics accurate as of 1 September 2016

Club	Season	League		Cup		Continental		Total	
Club	Season	Apps	Goals	Apps	Goals	Apps	Goals	Apps	Goals
Saint-Étienne	2008–09	15	1	3	0	—		18	1
Saint-Étienne	2009–10	22	5	2	4	—		24	9
Saint-Étienne	2010–11	22	7	5	4	—		27	11
Saint-Étienne	2011–12	22	13	2	1	—		24	14
Saint-Étienne	Total	81	26	12	9	—		93	35
Juvisy	2012–13	19	11	3	2	7	2	29	15
Juvisy	2013–14	21	9	2	1	—	—	23	10
Juvisy	2014–15	21	10	3	4	—	—	24	14
Juvisy	2015–16	19	7	3	4	—	—	22	11
Juvisy	Total	80	37	11	11	7	2	98	50
Career total		161	63	23	20	7	2	191	85

=== International ===
(Correct as of 1 September 2016)

National team	Season	Apps	Goals
France	2011–12	10	2
France	2012–13	9	0
France	2013–14	4	0
Total		23	2

==== International goals ====
#	Date	Venue	Opponent	Score	Result	Competition
1	4 July 2012	Stade de la Source, Orléans, France	Romania	6–0	6–0	Friendly
2	28 July 2012	Hampden Park, Glasgow, Scotland	North Korea	5–0	5–0	2012 Summer Olympics
3	7 July 2017	Stade de la Mosson, Montpellier, France	Belgium	2–0	2–0	Friendly
Correct as of 20 June 2018

== Honours ==
- SheBelieves Cup: Winner 2017
