= Breve (disambiguation) =

Breve is the diacritical mark ˘.

Breve or Breves may also refer to:

- Breve (music), or double whole note
- Breve, a mark used to denote a short syllable in scansion
- Breve, a type of milk coffee
- Brèves, commune in Nièvre, France
- Breves, Pará, a municipality in Brazil
  - Breves Airport
- Papal brief or breve, a formal document emanating from the Pope

== See also ==
- Brevet (disambiguation)
- Bréval, a commune in Yvelines, France
