= Marion Torrent =

French footballer (born 1992)

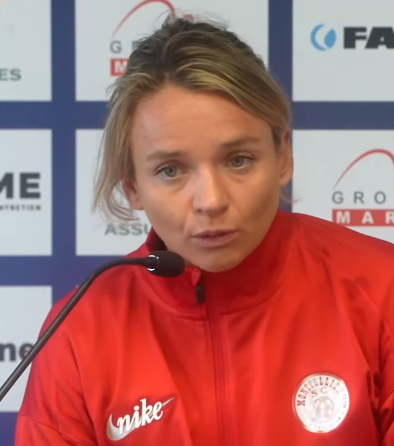
- Torrent in 2024

Personal information
- Date of birth: 17 April 1992 (age 34)
- Place of birth: Châlons-en-Champagne, France
- Height: 1.64 m (5 ft 5 in)
- Positions: Right-back; defensive midfielder

Team information
- Current team: Montpellier
- Number: 4

Youth career
- 1998–1999: Châlons-en-Champagne
- 1999–2004: Luynes
- 2004–2011: Montpellier

Senior career*
Years	Team	Apps	(Gls)
2007–2009	Montpellier B	14	(0)
2008–	Montpellier	314	(9)

International career
2008	France U16	4	(0)
2007–2009	France U17	13	(1)
2010–2011	France U19	14	(0)
2010	France U20	1	(0)
2014–2017	France U23	9	(2)
2017–2022	France	51	(1)
Medal record
Representing France
Women's football
UEFA Women's Under-19 Championship
Winner	2010 Macedonia
- * Club domestic league appearances and goals as of 6 November 2026

Marion Torrent (born 17 April 1992) is a French professional footballer who plays as a right-back or defensive midfielder for Première Ligue club Montpellier.

== Club career ==
Torrent joined Montpellier HSC, after arriving from Marseille, at the age of 13. Footballing runs in her family as her older brother had previously been selected to the academy for Ligue 1 club AJ Auxerre. She quickly adapted to the change of scenery earning her first honor with the Montpellier under-16 team winning the Coupe Fédérale 16 ans following a 6–0 thrashing of Juvisy. On 1 May 2008, she made her competitive debut with the senior team playing the full 90 minutes in the club's 2–1 defeat to Hénin-Beaumont. She finished the season with four appearances. For the 2008–09 season, Torrent's playing time increased to eight games, which included five starts. She also appeared in two cup matches, which included playing the entire final against Le Mans, helping Montpellier win the 2008–09 edition of the Challenge de France.

Torrent was given the first team number 4 shirt for the 2009–10 season and was given a starting position in the squad by manager Sarah M'Barek. She has starred for the club in the newly created UEFA Women's Champions League appearing in four matches helping the club reach the main round.

== International career ==
Torrent has been active with the women's section of the national team. She has earned caps with the women's under-16 and under-17. She was given the captaincy by under-16 manager Paco Rubio ahead of the 2008 edition of the Nordic Cup. In the tournament, France reached the final losing to Germany 5–0. Her captaincy carried over to the under-17 team as she represented her nation at the 2009 UEFA Women's Under-17 Championship, where France finished in a respectable third-place position. Torrent scored her only goal with the under-17s in their 16–0 thrashing of Armenia during the qualification process.

== Career statistics ==
=== Club ===
As of 27 May 2023

Appearances and goals by club, season and competition
Club	Season	League			Cup		Continental		Total	
Club	Season	Division	Apps	Goals	Apps	Goals	Apps	Goals	Apps	Goals
Montpellier	2007–08	D1F	4	0	0	0	—		4	0
Montpellier	2008–09	D1F	8	0	2	0	—		10	0
Montpellier	2009–10	D1F	14	0	1	0	6	0	21	0
Montpellier	2010–11	D1F	19	0	5	0	—		24	0
Montpellier	2011–12	D1F	16	1	3	1	—		19	2
Montpellier	2012–13	D1F	19	1	4	0	—		23	1
Montpellier	2013–14	D1F	20	0	1	0	—		21	0
Montpellier	2014–15	D1F	20	1	4	0	—		24	1
Montpellier	2015–16	D1F	18	0	6	0	—		24	0
Montpellier	2016–17	D1F	21	0	3	0	—		24	0
Montpellier	2017–18	D1F	18	0	4	0	6	0	28	0
Montpellier	2018–19	D1F	22	3	1	0	—		23	3
Montpellier	2019–20	D1F	13	0	2	0	—		15	0
Montpellier	2020–21	D1F	18	0	1	0	—		19	0
Montpellier	2021–22	D1F	20	0	3	0	—		23	0
Montpellier	2022–23	D1F	21	1	2	0	—		23	1
Career total			271	7	42	1	12	0	325	8

=== International ===
As of match played 11 October 2022

Appearances and goals by national team and year
National team	Year	Apps	Goals
France	2017	6	0
France	2018	9	0
France	2019	15	0
France	2020	5	1
France	2021	5	0
France	2022	11	0
Total		51	1

Scores and results list France's goal tally first, score column indicates score after each Torrent goal.

List of international goals scored by Marion Torrent
No.	Date	Venue	Opponent	Score	Result	Competition
1	22 September 2020	Toše Proeski Arena, Skopje, North Macedonia	North Macedonia	5–0	7–0	2022 UEFA Women's Euro qualification
