= 2012–13 Division 1 Féminine =

Division 1 Féminine
- Season: 2012–13
- Champions: Lyon; 11th title
- Relegated: Issy-les-Moulineaux; Vendenheim; Toulouse
- Champions League: Lyon
- Matches: 132
- Goals: 530 (4.02 per match)
- Biggest home win: Lyon 13–1 Arras (2 December 2012)
- Biggest away win: Toulouse 1–11 Lyon (6 January 2013)
- Highest scoring: Lyon 13–1 Arras (2 December 2012)

The 2012–13 Division 1 Féminine season was the 39th since its establishment. Lyon were the defending champions. The season began on 9 September 2012 and ended on 26 May 2013. The winter break was in effect from 17 December 2012 to 6 January 2013.

== Teams ==
Location of teams in 2012–13 Division 1 Féminine

There were three promoted teams from the Division 2 Féminine, the second level of women's football in France, replacing the three teams that were relegated from the Division 1 Féminine following the 2011–12 season. A total of 12 teams currently competes in the league with three clubs suffering relegation to the second division, Division 1 Féminine.

Teams promoted to Division 1 Féminine

- Arras
- Issy-les-Molineaux
- Toulouse

Teams relegated to Division 2 Féminine

- Hénin-Beaumont
- Muret
- Soyaux

=== Stadia and locations ===
Club	Location	Venue	Capacity
Arras	Arras	Stade Pierre-Bollé	1,500
Guingamp	Saint-Brieuc	Stade Fred Aubert	13,500
Issy-les-Moulineaux	Issy-les-Moulineaux	Stade Gabriel-Voisin	1,000
Juvisy	Viry-Châtillon	Stade Georges Maquin	2,000
Lyon	Lyon	Plaine des Jeux de Gerland	2,500
Montpellier	Villeneuve-lès-Maguelone	Stade Joseph Blanc	1,000
Paris Saint-Germain	Paris	Stade Georges Lefèvre	3,500
Rodez	Rodez	Stade de Vabre	400
Saint-Étienne	Saint-Étienne	Stade Léon Nautin	1,000
Toulouse	Toulouse	Stadium Municipal Annexe 1	1,700
Vendenheim	Vendenheim	Stade Waldeck	2,000
Yzeure	Yzeure	Stade de Bellevue	2,135

== League table ==
Note: A win in D1 Féminine is worth 4 points, with 2 points for a draw and 1 for a defeat.

Pos	Team	Pld	W	D	L	GF	GA	GD	Pts	Qualification or relegation
1	Lyon (C, Q)	22	22	0	0	132	5	+127	88	Qualification for Women's Champions League
2	Paris Saint-Germain (Q)	22	18	2	2	75	10	+65	78	Qualification for Women's Champions League
3	Juvisy	22	16	1	5	65	16	+49	71	
4	Montpellier	22	14	3	5	65	23	+42	67	
5	Yzeure	22	9	4	9	34	44	−10	53	
6	Saint-Étienne	22	8	6	8	27	35	−8	52	
7	Guingamp	22	9	3	10	35	43	−8	52	
8	Rodez	22	7	3	12	24	49	−25	46	
9	Arras	22	4	5	13	23	76	−53	39	
10	Vendenheim (R)	22	3	4	15	14	74	−60	35	Relegation to Division 2 Féminine
11	Issy-les-Molineaux (R)	22	2	3	17	19	74	−55	31	Relegation to Division 2 Féminine
12	Toulouse (R)	22	1	4	17	17	81	−64	29	Relegation to Division 2 Féminine

Source: French Football Federation
Rules for classification: 1st points; 2nd head-to-head goal difference; 3rd total goal difference
(C) Champions; (Q) Qualified for the phase indicated; (R) Relegated

== Results ==
Home \ Away	ARA	GUI	ISS	JUV	LYO	MON	PSG	ROD	SET	TOU	VEN	YZE
Arras		1–1	2–1	3–4	0–6	0–3	1–4	0–2	0–2	2–2	2–0	4–1
Guingamp	7–0		4–2	0–2	1–5	1–6	1–1	2–0	0–1	3–0	1–0	2–0
Issy-les-Molineaux	1–1	0–2		0–4	0–8	1–3	0–2	0–1	0–2	4–2	1–4	2–2
Juvisy	6–0	3–1	9–1		0–4	2–0	0–2	0–0	4–0	6–0	4–0	3–0
Lyon	13–1	3–0	9–0	2–0		6–2	3–0	8–0	5–0	7–0	13–0	3–0
Montpellier	7–0	1–1	8–0	0–1	0–4		1–1	7–0	1–1	2–1	6–0	1–0
Paris Saint-Germain	6–0	5–0	2–0	2–1	0–1	3–1		5–0	4–1	3–0	11–0	3–0
Rodez	5–1	4–0	1–0	0–3	0–3	0–2	0–4		1–1	4–1	0–2	2–4
Saint-Étienne	1–1	4–0	2–0	0–5	0–3	0–2	0–5	2–0		5–1	3–0	2–2
Toulouse	0–2	1–2	3–4	0–5	1–11	0–5	0–6	1–1	1–0		0–0	1–5
Vendenheim	2–2	1–4	2–1	0–3	0–7	1–4	0–3	0–1	0–0	1–1		1–4
Yzeure	2–0	3–2	1–1	1–0	0–8	0–3	0–3	3–2	0–0	3–1	3–0	

Source: French Football Federation
Legend: Blue = home team win; Yellow = draw; Red = away team win.

== Statistics ==
=== Top scorers ===
Rank	Player	Club	Goals
1	(Sweden) Lotta Schelin	Lyon	24
2	(France) Camille Abily	Lyon	20
2	(France) Eugénie Le Sommer	Lyon	20
4	(France) Hoda Lattaf	Montpellier	19
5	(France) Laura Bouillot	Yzeure	18
6	(Sweden) Kosovare Asllani	Paris SG	17
6	(United States) Lindsey Horan	Paris SG	17
6	(France) Laëtitia Tonazzi	Lyon	17
9	(France) Marie-Laure Delie	Montpellier	15
10	(France) Gaëtane Thiney	Juvisy	13

Source: Official Goalscorers' Standings
