= 2013–14 Division 1 Féminine =

Division 1 Féminine
- Season: 2013–14
- Champions: Lyon; 12th title
- Relegated: Hénin-Beaumont; Yzeure; Muret
- Champions League: Lyon; Paris Saint-Germain
- Matches: 132
- Goals: 501 (3.8 per match)
- Top goalscorer: Gaëtane Thiney (25 goals)
- Biggest home win: Paris Saint-Germain 11-0 Hénin-Beaumont (20 April 2014)
- Biggest away win: Muret 0–10 Juvisy (1 June 2014)
- Highest scoring: Arras 2-11 Lyon (1 February 2014)
- Longest winning run: 13 games Lyon
- Longest unbeaten run: 13 games Lyon
- Longest winless run: 22 games Muret
- Longest losing run: 18 games Muret

The 2013–14 Division 1 Féminine season was the 40th since its establishment. Lyon were the defending champions. The season began on 1 September 2013 and ended on 1 June 2014. The winter break was in effect from 23 December 2013 to 18 January 2014.

== Teams ==
Location of teams in 2013–14 Division 1 Féminine

There were three promoted teams from the Division 2 Féminine, the second level of women's football in France, replacing the three teams that were relegated from the Division 1 Féminine following the 2012–13 season. A total of 12 teams currently compete in the league with three clubs suffering relegation to the second division, Division 2 Féminine.

Teams promoted to Division 1 Féminine

- Muret
- Hénin-Beaumont
- Soyaux

Teams relegated to Division 2 Féminine

- Issy-les-Molineaux
- Toulouse
- Vendenheim

=== Stadia and locations ===
Club	Location	Venue	Capacity
Arras	Arras	Stade Pierre-Bollé	1,500
Guingamp	Saint-Brieuc	Stade Fred Aubert	13,500
Hénin-Beaumont	Hénin-Beaumont	Stade Octave-Birembaut	3,000
Juvisy	Viry-Châtillon	Stade Georges Maquin	2,000
Lyon	Lyon	Plaine des Jeux de Gerland	2,500
Montpellier	Villeneuve-lès-Maguelone	Stade Joseph Blanc	1,000
Muret	Muret	Stade Clément Ader	3,000
Paris Saint-Germain	Paris	Stade Georges Lefèvre	3,500
Rodez	Rodez	Stade de Vabre	400
Saint-Étienne	Saint-Étienne	Stade Léon Nautin	1,000
Soyaux	Soyaux	Stade Léo-Lagrange	4,800
Yzeure	Yzeure	Stade de Bellevue	2,135

== League table ==
Note: A win in D1 Féminine is worth 4 points, with 2 points for a draw and 1 for a defeat.

Pos	Team	Pld	W	D	L	GF	GA	GD	Pts	Qualification or relegation
1	Lyon (C, Q)	22	21	0	1	95	12	+83	85	Qualification for Women's Champions League
2	Paris Saint-Germain (Q)	22	18	2	2	81	10	+71	78	Qualification for Women's Champions League
3	Juvisy	22	18	1	3	64	24	+40	77	
4	Montpellier	22	15	1	6	67	20	+47	68	
5	Guingamp	22	7	6	9	29	43	−14	49	
6	Soyaux	22	7	4	11	32	49	−17	47	
7	Rodez	22	6	5	11	29	46	−17	45	
8	Arras	22	6	4	12	27	56	−29	44	
9	Saint-Étienne	22	5	6	11	23	35	−12	43	
10	Hénin-Beaumont (R)	22	5	6	11	27	56	−29	43	Relegation to Division 2 Féminine
11	Yzeure (R)	22	5	2	15	19	41	−22	39	Relegation to Division 2 Féminine
12	Muret (R)	22	0	1	21	8	109	−101	23	Relegation to Division 2 Féminine

Rules for classification: 1st points; 2nd head-to-head goal difference; 3rd total goal difference
(C) Champions; (Q) Qualified for the phase indicated; (R) Relegated

== Results ==
Home \ Away	ARA	GUI	HEB	JUV	LYO	MON	MUR	PSG	ROD	SET	SOY	YZE
Arras		0–0	0–1	2–3	2–11	1–3	2–2	1–6	1–0	1–0	3–0	2–0
Guingamp	3–2		4–1	2–6	1–5	1–2	5–1	0–6	0–0	0–3	1–0	1–1
Hénin-Beaumont	2–2	1–1		2–4	0–4	0–3	7–0	0–1	0–4	0–3	1–1	3–0
Juvisy	2–0	2–1	3–0		0–4	2–1	4–0	2–2	3–1	2–1	1–2	1–0
Lyon	3–2	5–0	7–0	3–0		2–1	10–1	0–1	4–0	4–1	5–0	1–0
Montpellier	7–1	2–0	4–0	1–2	1–4		5–0	1–2	8–1	3–1	2–0	4–0
Muret	0–1	0–3	1–5	0–10	0–7	0–6		0–9	1–6	0–4	1–7	0–3
Paris Saint-Germain	3–0	4–0	11–0	0–1	0–3	2–0	4–0		7–0	5–0	6–0	4–0
Rodez	1–2	0–0	1–1	1–6	1–2	0–2	2–0	0–3		1–1	1–1	2–0
Saint-Étienne	1–1	1–1	0–0	0–3	1–5	1–1	2–0	0–0	0–2		1–2	0–2
Soyaux	5–0	0–1	1–1	1–4	0–5	0–7	4–1	2–3	3–2	0–1		1–0
Yzeure	3–1	1–4	1–2	0–3	0–1	0–3	3–0	0–2	1–3	2–1	2–2	

Legend: Blue = home team win; Yellow = draw; Red = away team win.

== Statistics ==
=== Top scorers ===
Rank	Player	Club	Goals
1	(France) Gaëtane Thiney	Juvisy	25
2	(France) Marie-Laure Delie	Paris SG	24
3	(Sweden) Josefine Öqvist	Montpellier	18
4	(France) Eugénie Le Sommer	Lyon	15
4	(France) Laetitia Tonazzi	Lyon	15
6	(United States) Lindsey Horan	Paris SG	14
7	(France) Camille Abily	Lyon	13
8	(Sweden) Lotta Schelin	Lyon	12
9	(Japan) Rumi Utsugi	Montpellier	10
10	(France) Viviane Asseyi	Montpellier	9
10	(France) Sandrine Brétigny	Juvisy	9
10	(France) Camille Catala	Juvisy	9
10	(Germany) Anaïs Ribeyra	Rodez	9

Source: Official Goalscorers' Standings
