= Romane Munich =

French footballer (born 1994)

Personal information
- Date of birth: 6 October 1994 (age 32)
- Place of birth: Moselle, France
- Height: 1.73 m (5 ft 8 in)
- Position: Goalkeeper

Team information
- Current team: ASJ Soyaux-Charente

Senior career*
Years	Team	Apps	(Gls)
2010–2011	FSV Jägersburg		
2011–2012	1. FC Saarbrücken		
2012–2014	FC Vendenheim	47	(0)
2014–2016	Nancy	43	(0)
2016–	ASJ Soyaux-Charente	139	(0)
- * Club domestic league appearances and goals

Romane Munich (born 6 October 1994) is a French footballer who plays as a goalkeeper for ASJ Soyaux-Charente.

== Early life ==
Munich was born in 1994 in Moselle, France. She started playing as a goalkeeper at the age of eight.

== Education ==
Munich obtained a technical university degree.

== Club career ==
Munich has been regarded as one of the highest performing goalkeepers in the league. In 2012, she signed for French side FC Vendenheim.

== International career ==
Munich represented France internationally at youth level and helped the under-17 team achieve second place at the 2011 UEFA Women's Under-17 Championship.

== Personal life ==
Munich is the daughter of a football coach father.
