= Brevet (disambiguation) =

A brevet is a higher rank that rewards merit or gallantry, but without higher pay.

Brevet may also refer to:

== Military ==
- Brevet d'état-major, a military distinction in France and Belgium awarded to officers passing military staff college
- Aircrew brevet, or aircrew flying badge
- Parachutist brevet, or parachutist badge
- Marine Corps Brevet Medal, a former military award in the U.S. Marines

== Other uses ==
- Brevet (cycling), a long-distance cycling sport or a certificate awarded at such events
- Brevet des colleges, a national diploma given to French pupils who pass the exam the end of 3e or year 10
- Brevet, a non-hereditary form of French nobility
- Brevet d'invention, a French term for a kind of patent
- "En France c'est le Brevet" famous quote by Adrian IV on absolutism in the French Catholic Church
- Ophélie Brevet (born 1992), French soccer player
