= Marie-Laure Delie =

French footballer (born 1988)

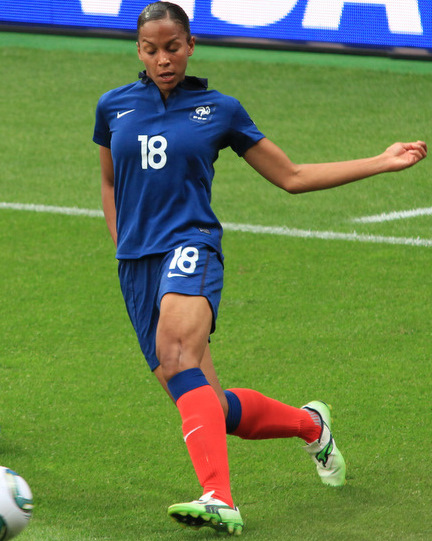
- Delie playing for France in the 2011 FIFA Women's World Cup

Personal information
- Date of birth: 29 January 1988 (age 38)
- Place of birth: Villiers-le-Bel, France
- Height: 1.72 m (5 ft 7 1/2 in)
- Position: Striker

Youth career
- 1995–2000: Viarmes Asnières
- 2000–2005: Domont FC

Senior career*
Years	Team	Apps	(Gls)
2005–2007	CNFE Clairefontaine	37	(19)
2007–2008	Paris Saint-Germain	22	(16)
2008–2013	Montpellier	104	(76)
2013–2018	Paris Saint-Germain	62	(59)
2018–2019	Metz	22	(3)
2019–2020	Madrid CFF	8	(1)

International career^{‡}
2005	France U17	4	(2)
2006–2007	France U19	23	(22)
2007–2008	France U20	12	(8)
2009–2017	France	123	(65)
- * Club domestic league appearances and goals as of 5 January 2020 ‡ National team caps and goals as of 1 March 2017

Marie-Laure Delie (born 29 January 1988) is a French former football player who played as a striker. She plays as a striker and is a member of the France women's national football team having made her debut for the team on 23 September 2009.

== Club career ==
=== Early career ===
Delie began her career playing for Olympique Viarmes Asnières, just north of her birthplace. After five years at the club, she joined Domont FC, In 2005, Delie being selected to the CNFE Clairefontaine, the women's section of the prestigious Clairefontaine academy. She spent two seasons with the team making 37 appearances and scoring 19 goals. Before the 2007–2008 season, Delie drew interest from both Division 1 Féminine clubs Montpellier and Paris Saint-Germain. She eventually agreed to join the latter club. In her only one season at the club, she played in all of the club's league matches and scored 16 goals.

=== Montpellier ===
After a successful season at Paris Saint-Germain, Montpellier remained keen on signing the young striker. In June 2008, Delie reached an agreement to sign with the club and was handed the number 23 shirt by manager Sarak M'Barek. In her first season with Montpellier, she scored a team-leading 19 goals and helped the club win the 2008–09 Challenge de France. Delie remained potent on the field of play in the 2009–10 season as Montpellier were not only playing in domestic competitions, but also in the 2009–10 edition of the UEFA Women's Champions League. She finished as the second-best scorer in the league behind Eugénie Le Sommer after netting 18 in 20 league matches.

In the team's defense of the Challenge de France, Delie scored a team-high six goals in five matches as Montpellier reached the final for the second consecutive season. The club was unable to defend its title though losing 5–0 to Delie's former club Paris Saint-Germain in the final. In the Champions League, Delie scored three goals in the first qualifying rounds in wins over Bulgarian club NSA Sofia and Macedonian outfit ZFK Tikvesanka. In the Round of 32, Delie scored the team's final goal in a 3–1 second leg victory over the women's section of Belgian club Standard Liège. Montpellier were later defeated in the quarter-finals by Swedish club Umeå. Delie ultimately finished the season with 34 total appearances and a team-leading 28 goals.

In the 2010–11 season, Delie appeared as all 22 league matches scoring 14 goals. In the cup, despite scoring only one goal as the lead striker, Montpellier still reached the final for the third consecutive season. The club, however, failed to live up to its 2008 performance falling on penalties to Saint-Étienne.

=== Paris Saint-Germain ===
In July 2013, she signed with PSG.

== International career ==
Delie has been active with the women's section of the national team. She has earned caps with the women's under-17, under-19, and under-20 teams. At under-19 level, Delie made 23 appearances and helped the team reach the final at the 2007 UEFA Women's Under-19 Championship, where they lost to Germany. Delie finished the competition as one of its joint top-scorers.

On 23 September 2009, Delie earned her first cap with the senior women's national team against Croatia. On her debut, she scored her first international goal in a 7–0 away win. In her following match with the team, against Estonia, she scored a double. France won the match 12–0. Delie quickly settled in with the team and finished the 2011 FIFA Women's World Cup qualification round with nine goals. In the 2011 Cyprus Cup, Delie scored a tournament-high six goals. Her goals were courtesy of separate hat tricks in wins over New Zealand and Scotland. On 15 June 2011, in a preparation friendly ahead of the 2011 FIFA Women's World Cup, Delie scored both team goals in a 2–1 win over Belgium. In the return friendly against Belgium on 18 June, Delie netted a hat trick in a 7–0 win. The treble was her third in the team's last five matches. She scored the only goal of the opening match of the World Cup against Nigeria at the Rhein-Neckar Arena, converting at close range from a cross by Eugénie Le Sommer, and also netted in the final group game against the hosts Germany, as France came fourth.

She was part of France's team at the 2012 Summer Olympics, scoring two goals in the group stages. She also played in the 2016 Olympics.

At the 2015 World Cup in Canada, Delie opened a 5–0 group stage win over Mexico which sent France through as group winners, her goal came after 34 seconds. In the last 16 against South Korea at the Olympic Stadium in Montreal, she struck in each half of a 3–0 victory.

== Career statistics ==
=== Club ===
Updated 1 September 2016

Club	Season	League		Cup		Continental		Total	
Club	Season	Apps	Goals	Apps	Goals	Apps	Goals	Apps	Goals
CNFE Clairefontaine	2005–06	16	5	0	0	0	0	16	5
CNFE Clairefontaine	2006–07	21	14	0	0	0	0	21	14
CNFE Clairefontaine	Total	37	19	0	0	0	0	37	19
Paris SG	2007–08	22	16	5	5	0	0	27	21
Paris SG	Total	22	16	5	5	0	0	27	21
Montpellier	2008–09	22	17	5	2	0	0	27	19
Montpellier	2009–10	20	18	5	6	9	4	34	28
Montpellier	2010–11	22	14	4	1	0	0	26	15
Montpellier	2011–12	19	12	5	2	0	0	24	14
Montpellier	2012–13	21	15	5	3	0	0	26	18
Montpellier	Total	104	76	24	14	9	4	137	94
Paris SG	2013–14	20	24	3	5	2	0	25	29
Paris SG	2014–15	17	14	3	3	7	3	27	20
Paris SG	2015–16	18	12	5	6	5	0	28	18
Paris SG	Total	55	50	11	14	14	3	80	67
Career total		218	161	40	33	23	7	281	201

=== International ===
(Correct as of 1 September 2016)

National team	Season	Apps	Goals
France	2009–10	9	9
France	2010–11	13	13
France	2011–12	16	11
France	2012–13	20	12
France	2013–14	17	10
France	2014–15	15	6
France	2015–16	12	2
France	2016–17	6	0
Total		108	63

==== International goals ====
No.	Date	Venue	Opponent	Score	Result	Competition
1	23 September 2009	Stadion NK Inter Zaprešić, Zaprešić, Croatia	Croatia	0–3	0–7	2011 FIFA Women's World Cup qualification
2	28 October 2009	Stade Jules Deschaseaux, Le Havre, France	Estonia	10–0	12–0	2011 FIFA Women's World Cup qualification
3	28 October 2009	Stade Jules Deschaseaux, Le Havre, France	Estonia	11–0	12–0	2011 FIFA Women's World Cup qualification
4	25 February 2010	Richman Park, Dublin, Republic of Ireland	Republic of Ireland	1–2	1–2	Friendly
5	27 March 2010	Stade de la Libération, Boulogne-sur-Mer, France	Northern Ireland	4–0	6–0	2011 FIFA Women's World Cup qualification
6	31 March 2010	Windsor Park, Belfast, Northern Ireland	Northern Ireland	0–4	0–4	2011 FIFA Women's World Cup qualification
7	20 June 2010	Stade Léo Lagrange, Besançon, France	Croatia	3–0	3–0	2011 FIFA Women's World Cup qualification
8	23 June 2010	Kadrioru Stadium, Tallinn, Estonia	Estonia	0–5	0–6	2011 FIFA Women's World Cup qualification
9	23 June 2010	Kadrioru Stadium, Tallinn, Estonia	Estonia	0–6	0–6	2011 FIFA Women's World Cup qualification
10	25 August 2010	Stade de l'Aube, Troyes, France	Serbia	4–0	7–0	2011 FIFA Women's World Cup qualification
11	7 March 2011	GSP Stadium, Nicosia, Cyprus	New Zealand	1–0	5–2	2011 Cyprus Cup
12	7 March 2011	GSP Stadium, Nicosia, Cyprus	New Zealand	2–0	5–2	2011 Cyprus Cup
13	7 March 2011	GSP Stadium, Nicosia, Cyprus	New Zealand	4–2	5–2	2011 Cyprus Cup
14	9 March 2011	GSP Stadium, Nicosia, Cyprus	Scotland	0–1	0–3	2011 Cyprus Cup
15	9 March 2011	GSP Stadium, Nicosia, Cyprus	Scotland	0–2	0–3	2011 Cyprus Cup
16	9 March 2011	GSP Stadium, Nicosia, Cyprus	Scotland	0–3	0–3	2011 Cyprus Cup
17	15 June 2011	Sportpark de Lenspolder, Nieuwpoort, Belgium	Belgium	1–1	1–2	Friendly
18	15 June 2011	Sportpark de Lenspolder, Nieuwpoort, Belgium	Belgium	1–2	1–2	Friendly
19	18 June 2011	Stade de l'Épopée, Calais, France	Belgium	1–0	7–0	Friendly
20	18 June 2011	Stade de l'Épopée, Calais, France	Belgium	2–0	7–0	Friendly
21	18 June 2011	Stade de l'Épopée, Calais, France	Belgium	3–0	7–0	Friendly
22	26 June 2011	Rhein-Neckar-Arena, Sinsheim, Germany	Nigeria	1–0	1–0	2011 FIFA Women's World Cup
23	5 July 2011	Borussia-Park, Mönchengladbach, Germany	Germany	1–2	2–4	2011 FIFA Women's World Cup
24	14 September 2011	Ness Ziona Stadium, Ness Ziona, Israel	Israel	5–0	5–0	UEFA Women's Euro 2013 qualifying
25	22 September 2011	Turner's Cross, Cork, Republic of Ireland	Republic of Ireland	0–2	1–3	UEFA Women's Euro 2013 qualifying
26	22 October 2011	Parc y Scarlets, Llanelli, Wales	Wales	1–4	1–4	UEFA Women's Euro 2013 qualifying
27	16 November 2011	Stade René Serge Nabajoth, Pointe-à-Pitre, Guadeloupe	Uruguay	2–0	8–0	Friendly
28	20 November 2011	Stade Pierre-Aliker, Fort-de-France, Martinique	Mexico	2–0	5–0	Friendly
29	20 November 2011	Stade Pierre-Aliker, Fort-de-France, Martinique	Mexico	3–0	5–0	Friendly
30	15 February 2012	Stade des Costières, Nîmes, France	Netherlands	2–1	2–1	Friendly
31	28 February 2012	GSP Stadium, Nicosia, Cyprus	Switzerland	1–0	3–0	2012 Cyprus Cup
32	4 March 2012	Paralimni Stadium, Paralimni, Cyprus	England	0–2	0–3	2012 Cyprus Cup
33	6 March 2012	GSZ Stadium, Larnaca, Cyprus	Canada	1–0	2–0	2012 Cyprus Cup
34	11 July 2012	Stade Pierre Brisson, Beauvais, France	Russia	2–0	3–0	Friendly
35	11 July 2012	Stade Pierre Brisson, Beauvais, France	Russia	3–0	3–0	Friendly
36	19 July 2012	Stade Sébastien Charléty, Paris, France	Japan	1–0	2–0	Friendly
37	25 July 2012	Hampden Park, Glasgow, Scotland	United States	0–2	4–2	2012 Summer Olympics
38	28 July 2012	Hampden Park, Glasgow, Scotland	North Korea	3–0	5–0	2012 Summer Olympics
39	19 September 2012	Tynecastle Stadium, Edinburgh, Scotland	Scotland	0–1	0–5	UEFA Women's Euro 2013 qualifying
40	19 September 2012	Tynecastle Stadium, Edinburgh, Scotland	Scotland	0–5	0–5	UEFA Women's Euro 2013 qualifying
41	20 October 2012	Stade Sébastien Charléty, Paris, France	England	1–2	2–2	Friendly
42	20 October 2012	Stade Sébastien Charléty, Paris, France	England	2–2	2–2	Friendly
43	13 February 2013	Stade de la Meinau, Strasbourg, France	Germany	3–1	3–3	Friendly
44	1 June 2013	Stade du Hainaut, Valenciennes, France	Finland	1–0	3–0	Friendly
45	1 June 2013	Stade du Hainaut, Valenciennes, France	Finland	3–0	3–0	Friendly
46	12 July 2013	Idrottsparken, Norrköping, Sweden	Russia	1–0	3–1	UEFA Women's Euro 2013
47	12 July 2013	Idrottsparken, Norrköping, Sweden	Russia	2–0	3–1	UEFA Women's Euro 2013
48	25 September 2013	Kazhimukan Munaitpasov Stadium, Astana, Kazakhstan	Kazakhstan	0–1	0–4	2015 FIFA Women's World Cup qualification
49	23 November 2013	Lovech Stadium, Lovech, Bulgaria	Bulgaria	0–1	0–10	2015 FIFA Women's World Cup qualification
50	23 November 2013	Lovech Stadium, Lovech, Bulgaria	Bulgaria	0–2	0–10	2015 FIFA Women's World Cup qualification
51	23 November 2013	Lovech Stadium, Lovech, Bulgaria	Bulgaria	0–4	0–10	2015 FIFA Women's World Cup qualification
52	7 March 2014	GSP Stadium, Nicosia, Cyprus	Australia	0–1	2–3	2014 Cyprus Cup
53	5 April 2014	Jean-Bouin Stadium, Angers, France	Kazakhstan	1–0	7–0	2015 FIFA Women's World Cup qualification
54	5 April 2014	Jean-Bouin Stadium, Angers, France	Kazakhstan	2–0	7–0	2015 FIFA Women's World Cup qualification
55	9 April 2014	MMArena, Le Mans, France	Austria	2–0	3–1	2015 FIFA Women's World Cup qualification
56	20 August 2014	Bozsik Stadion, Budapest, Hungary	Hungary	0–4	0–4	2015 FIFA Women's World Cup qualification
57	17 September 2014	Stade de l'Épopée, Calais, France	Finland	3–1	3–1	2015 FIFA Women's World Cup qualification
58	28 May 2015	Stade Marcel Picot, Tomblaine, France	Scotland	1–0	1–0	Friendly
59	17 June 2015	Lansdowne Stadium, Ottawa, Canada	Mexico	0–1	0–5	2015 FIFA Women's World Cup
60	21 June 2015	Olympic Stadium, Montreal, Canada	South Korea	1–0	3–0	2015 FIFA Women's World Cup
61	21 June 2015	Olympic Stadium, Montreal, Canada	South Korea	3–0	3–0	2015 FIFA Women's World Cup
62	22 September 2015	MMArena, Le Mans, France	Romania	1–0	3–0	UEFA Women's Euro 2017 qualifying
63	27 October 2015	Arena Lviv, Lviv, Ukraine	Ukraine	0–1	0–3	UEFA Women's Euro 2017 qualifying
64	20 September 2016	Stade Sébastien Charléty, Paris, France	Albania	0–6	6–0	UEFA Women's Euro 2017 qualifying
65	1 March 2017	Talen Energy Stadium, Chester, United States	England	1–1	1–2	2017 SheBelieves Cup
Correct as of 1 March 2017

== Honours ==
=== Club ===
Montpellier

- Challenge de France: 2008–09

Paris Saint-Germain

- Challenge de France: 2017-2018

=== International ===
France

- Cyprus Cup: Winner 2012, 2014
- SheBelieves Cup: Winner 2017

== See also ==
- List of women's footballers with 100 or more caps
