= Noémie Freckhaus =

French footballer (born 1988)

Personal information
- Date of birth: 27 August 1988 (age 38)
- Place of birth: Strasbourg, France
- Height: 1.70 m (5 ft 7 in)
- Position: Centre-back

Noémie Freckhaus (born 27 August 1988) is a French footballer who played as a centre-back for SC Sand.
