= Nora Hamou Maamar =

French–Algerian footballer (born 1983)

Personal information
- Date of birth: 18 May 1983 (age 43)
- Place of birth: Blois, France
- Height: 1.68 m (5 ft 6 in)
- Position: Midfielder

Senior career*
Years	Team	Apps	(Gls)
2002–2013	Montpellier	88	(4)
2013–2016	Nîmes Metropole Gard	38	(0)

International career
- Algeria
- * Club domestic league appearances and goals

Nora Hamou Maamar (Arabic: نورا حمو معمر; born 18 May 1983) is a former footballer who played as midfielder. Born in France, she has been a member of the Algeria women's national team.

== Club career ==
Hamou Maamar played for Montpellier HSC from 2002 to 2013 before leaving for Nîmes.

With Montpellier, she has won two Leagues and three national Cups.

== International career ==
Hamou Maamar was a member of the Algeria women's national football team at the 2010 African Women's Championship in South Africa.
