= Aude Moreau =

French artist

Aude Moreau (born 1969) is a French artist. Moreau was born in Gencay, France. Her work is included in the collections of the Musée d'art contemporain de Montréal, the Musée national des beaux-arts du Québec and the Musée d’Art Moderne Grand-Duc Jean, Luxembourg.
