= Ophélie Brevet =

French footballer

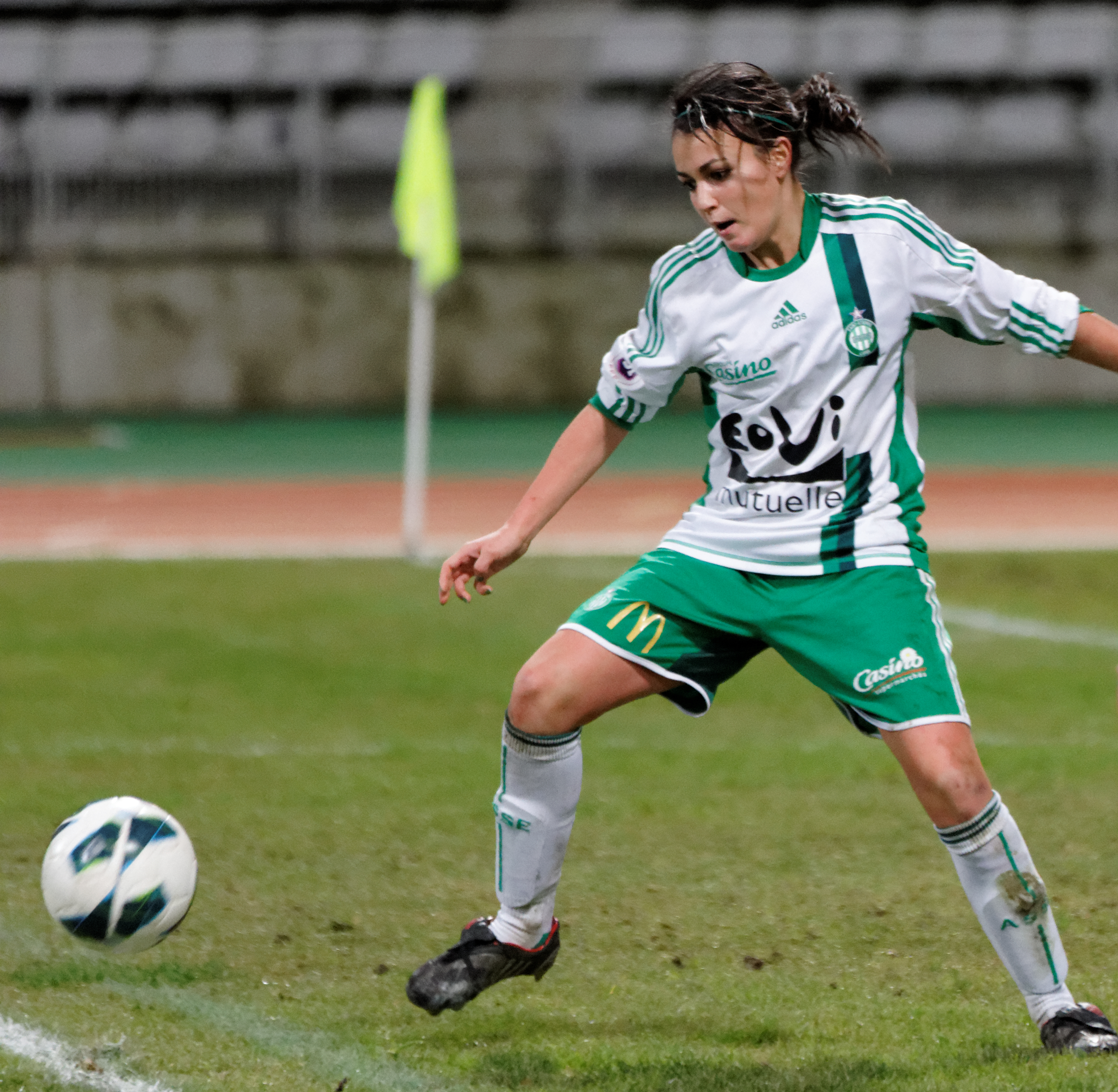
- Ophélie Brevet playing for Saint-Étienne in the 2012–13 season

Personal information
- Date of birth: 23 August 1992 (age 34)
- Place of birth: Villefranche-sur-Saône, France
- Position: Fullback

Ophélie Brevet (born 23 August 1992) is a retired French professional footballer who has played as a fullback for Première Ligue club AS Saint-Étienne.

== International career ==
Brevet has represented France at youth level.

== Honours ==
Saint-Étienne

- Coupe de France Féminine: 2011
