= Laura Bouillot =

French footballer (born 1992)

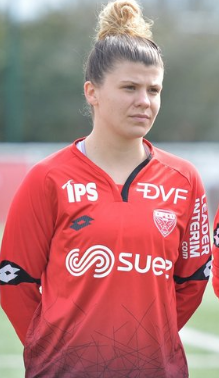

Personal information
- Date of birth: 21 July 1992 (age 34)
- Place of birth: Moulins, Allier, France
- Position: Forward

Senior career*
Years	Team	Apps	(Gls)
2014-2020	Dijon	141	(87)
- * Club domestic league appearances and goals

Laura Bouillot (born 21 July 1992) is a French footballer who plays as a striker for Dijon. At the end of the 2019-2020 season, Bouillot retired from professional football as Dijon's all time top goal scorer.

== International career ==
Laura Bouillot was one of five reserve players on standby for the France national team at Euro 2013.
