= Astrid Chazal =

French association football player (born 1989)

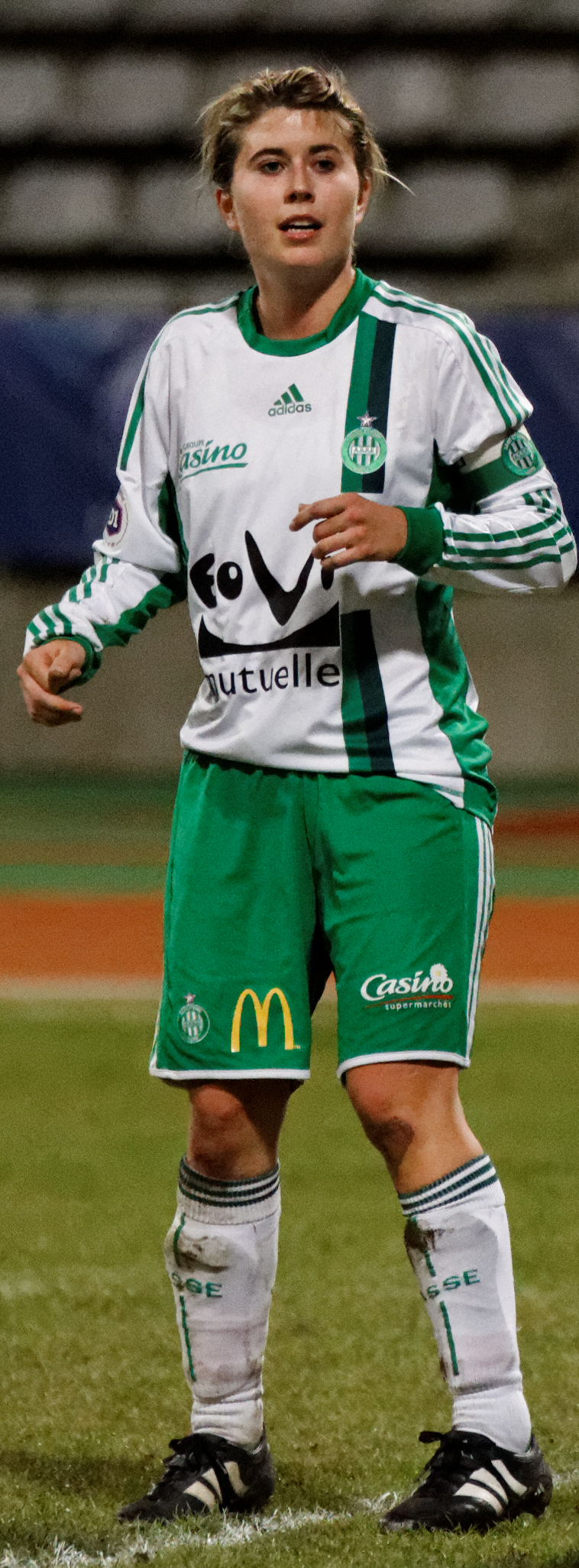

Personal information
- Date of birth: 10 December 1989 (age 36)
- Place of birth: Montbrison, Loire, France
- Height: 1.68 m (5 ft 6 in)
- Position: Defender

Astrid Chazal (born 10 December 1989) is a French footballer who played as a defender for AS Saint-Étienne. She won the 2011 Coupe de France in 2011. Chazal retired from football to take up professional cycling.

== Honours ==
Saint-Étienne

- Coupe de France Féminine: 2011
