= AS Muret =

French sporting club

Muret
- Full name: Amicale Sportive Muretaine football
- Founded: 1903
- Ground: Stade Clément Ader
- Capacity: 1,800
- Chairman: Marco Cafiéro
- Manager: Christophe Taine
- League: Régional 1 Occitanie
- 2021–22: National 3 Group H: Occitanie, 13th (relegated)
- Website: https://www.asmuretfootball.fr

Amicale Sportive Muretaine is a club located in Muret, France. Founded in 1903, it is mostly known for its football teams.

The women's team played in the highest level of league competition, Division 1 Féminine for ten consecutive seasons during the 1970s and 1980s, and again in 2011–12 and 2013–14, but finished bottom of the table on both occasions. In 2019, the women's team created a sporting collective with FC Roquettes and FC Eaunes Labarthe, to compete in Régional 2 Féminine of the Ligue de Occitanie.

The men's team played at the top level of amateur football between 1976 and 1996. It reached the round of 32 of the Coupe de France six times before exciting the competition: in 1979 and 1994 against Monaco, in 1987 against FC Martigues, in 1997 against Cannes, in 1999 against Trélissac FC, and in 2013 against Vendée Fontenay Foot. From 2018 until 2022 they played in Championnat National 3, the fifth level of men's football in France, after being promoted to the division in 2018. They were relegated to the regional league in 2022.
