= Kelly Gadéa =

French footballer (born 1991)

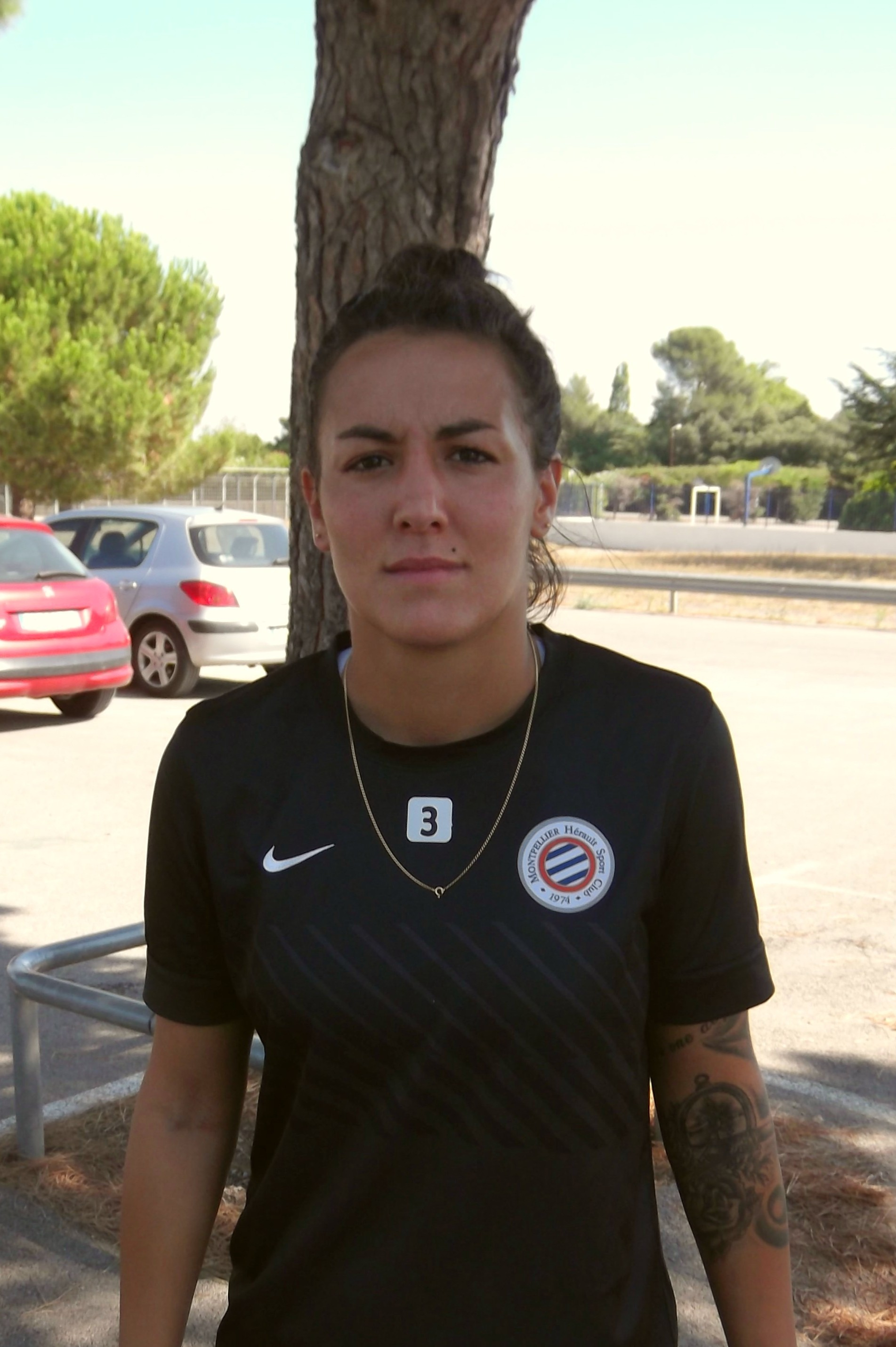
- Gadéa in 2013

Personal information
- Date of birth: 16 December 1991 (age 34)
- Place of birth: Nîmes, France
- Height: 1.69 m (5 ft 7 in)
- Positions: Centre back; defensive midfielder

Youth career
- 1998–2005: Caissargues

Senior career*
Years	Team	Apps	(Gls)
2005–2007	Montpellier	13	(0)
2007–2010	Saint-Étienne	42	(7)
2010–2016	Montpellier	100	(15)
2016–2018	Marseille	43	(4)
2018–2020	Fleury	33	(5)
2020	Sevilla	0	(0)
2021–2022	Soyaux	24	(1)
2022–2023	Le Havre	19	(0)
Total		274	(32)

International career
2006–2008	France U17	10	(1)
2009–2010	France U19	24	(1)
2010	France U20	4	(0)
2011–2016	France	5	(0)
- * Club domestic league appearances and goals as of 14:06, 22 November 2024 (UTC)

Kelly Gadéa (born 16 December 1991) is a French former footballer.

She is equally adept at playing as either a central defender or a defensive midfielder.

== Career ==
Gadéa had two stints with Montpellier having started her career with the club in 2005. In 2007, she joined Saint-Étienne and established herself as an up-and-coming talent domestically and internationally. After three seasons with the club, Gadea returned to Montpellier in 2010.

On 2 September 2020, Gadéa was announced at Sevilla.

On 26 July 2022, Gadéa was announced at Le Havre on a one year contract, with the option of an extension.

On 22 July 2023, Gadéa announced her retirement.

== International career ==
Gadéa is known for her leadership ability and has, subsequently, captained several of her age groups in international competitions. She has represented France at under-17, under-19, and under-20 levels. With the under-20 team, she played in the 2010 FIFA U-20 Women's World Cup. Her most notable moment in the competition came in a group stage match against Germany. With France trailing 4–1 in the second half, following a free-kick, Gadéa received the ball and took a chipped, driven shot straight at the goal. The ball went into the back of the net before bouncing back out, however, no goal was given by the referee. France lost the match by the same scoreline and was eliminated from the competition by goal difference. The non-call was similar to what happened the previous month at the 2010 FIFA World Cup in a match against England and Germany, which led to calls for the introduction of goal-line technology.

She was part of the French team at the 2012 Summer Olympics.
