= Stade Michel-Amand =

Stadium in Poitiers, France

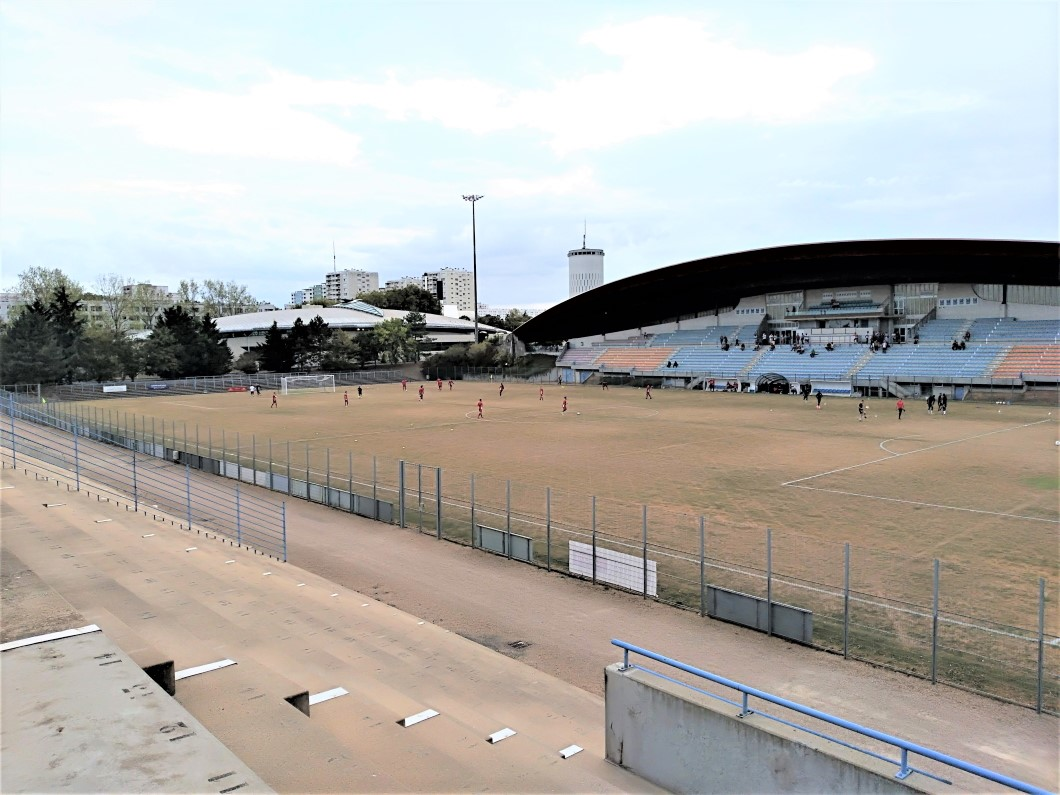
- The Stade Michel-Amand in 2019
- Interactive map of Stade Michel-Amand
- Former names: Stade de la Pépinière
- Location: Poitiers, Nouvelle-Aquitaine, France
- Coordinates: 46.59518450°N 0.36417320°E
- Owner: Grand Poitiers
- Capacity: 12,000
- Surface: Grass

Construction
- Built: 1986
- Opened: 1989
- Renovated: 1995

Tenant
- Stade Poitevin FC

The Stade Michel-Amand, formerly the Stade de la Pépinière, is a stadium in Poitiers, France. It is currently used for football matches and is the home stadium of Stade Poitevin FC. It has a capacity of 12,000.
