= Sarah M'Barek =

French footballer and manager (born 1977)

Personal information
- Date of birth: 13 October 1977 (age 49)
- Place of birth: Chaumont, France
- Height: 1.70 m (5 ft 7 in)
- Position: Midfielder

Team information
- Current team: Lens Féminin (manager)

Youth career
- 1992–1993: Vallée du Lys Pont
- 1993–1996: Orléans
- 1996–1997: Touraine
- 1997–2000: La Roche-sur-Yon

Senior career*
Years	Team	Apps	(Gls)
2000–2001	La Roche-sur-Yon	3	(0)
2001–2005	Montpellier	42	(5)

International career
1997–2002	France	21	(0)

Managerial career
- 2007–2013: Montpellier Féminines
- 2013–2021: Guingamp Féminines
- 2021–: Lens Féminin
- * Club domestic league appearances and goals

Sarah M'Barek (born 13 October 1977) is a French football manager and former player. She played as a midfielder and has represented the France women's national team, having attained 21 caps.

== Club career ==
M'Barek starred for Montpellier from 2001 to 2005.

== Managerial career ==
M'Barek was manager of Guingamp in Division 1 Féminine from 2013, but left to become manager of Racing Club de Lens Féminin which competes in Division 2 Féminine.

== Personal life ==
M'Barek is of Tunisian descent.
