= FC Vendenheim =

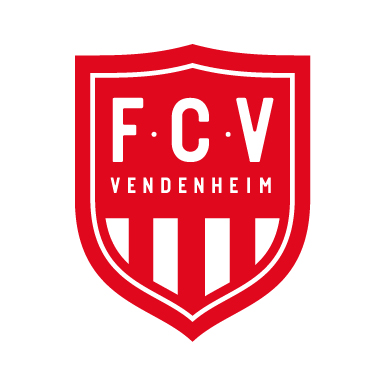
- Full name: Football Club Vendenheim Alsace
- Founded: 1974
- Ground: Les Floralies, Mundolsheim
- Chairman: Pascal Campos
- Manager: Dominique Steinberger
- League: D2 Féminine
- 2018-19: 7th
Home colours

Football Club Vendenheim Alsace is a French football club from Vendenheim founded in 1927. It is best known for its women's team, created in 1974. It was one of the sixteen founding members of the French Championship that same year, and it currently plays in the French Second Division after attaining in 2011 its third promotion since 2004.

== 2019–20 squad ==
Note: Flags indicate national team as defined under FIFA eligibility rules; some limited exceptions apply. Players may hold more than one non-FIFA nationality.

No.	Pos.	Nation	Player
1	GK	FRA	Romane Munich
2	DF	FRA	Laure Anstett
3	DF	FRA	Rebbecca Milloch
4	DF	FRA	Charlotte Landrieux
5	DF	FRA	Jennifer Meyer
7	MF	FRA	Marine Campos
8	MF	FRA	Cynthia Duteil
9	DF	FRA	Joanna Schwartz
10	MF	FRA	Julie Walocha
11	FW	FRA	Aurélie Mula

No.	Pos.	Nation	Player
12	FW	FRA	Cindy Thomas
14	FW	FRA	Fanny Hoarau
15	FW	FRA	Fanny Bovalo
16	GK	FRA	Delphine Soret
17	MF	FRA	Alexandra Atamaniuk
18	DF	FRA	Viviane Boudaud
19	MF	FRA	Nathalie Grammont
20	MF	FRA	Cloé Faillant
22	FW	BRA	Milena Alves

== Competition record ==
Season	Division	Place	Coupe de France
1974–75	1	Quarterfinals	
1975–76	2 (Gr. A)	?	
1976–77	2 (Gr. ?)	?	
1977–78	2 (Gr. ?)	?	
1978–79	2 (Gr. ?)	?	
1979–80	2 (Gr. ?)	?	
1980–81	2 (Gr. East)	?	
1981–82	2 (Gr. East)	?	
1982–83	2 (Gr. G)	?	
1983–84	1 (Gr. D)	5th	
1984–85	1 (Gr. C)	6th	
1985–86	2 (Gr. F)	?th	
1986–2001	?	?th	
2001–02	2 (Gr. B)	7th	
2002–03	3 (Gr. B)	2nd	
2003–04	2 (Gr. B)	1st	Round of 32
2004–05	1	8th	Quarterfinals
2005–06	1	11th	Round of 16
2006–07	2 (Gr. B)	1st	
2007–08	1	7th	Round of 16
2008–09	1	12th	Round of 16
2009–10	2 (Gr. B)	3rd	
2010–11	2 (Gr. B)	1st	Round of 16
2011–12	1	7th	Round of 64
2012–13	1		
