= Hoda Lattaf =

French footballer (born 1978)

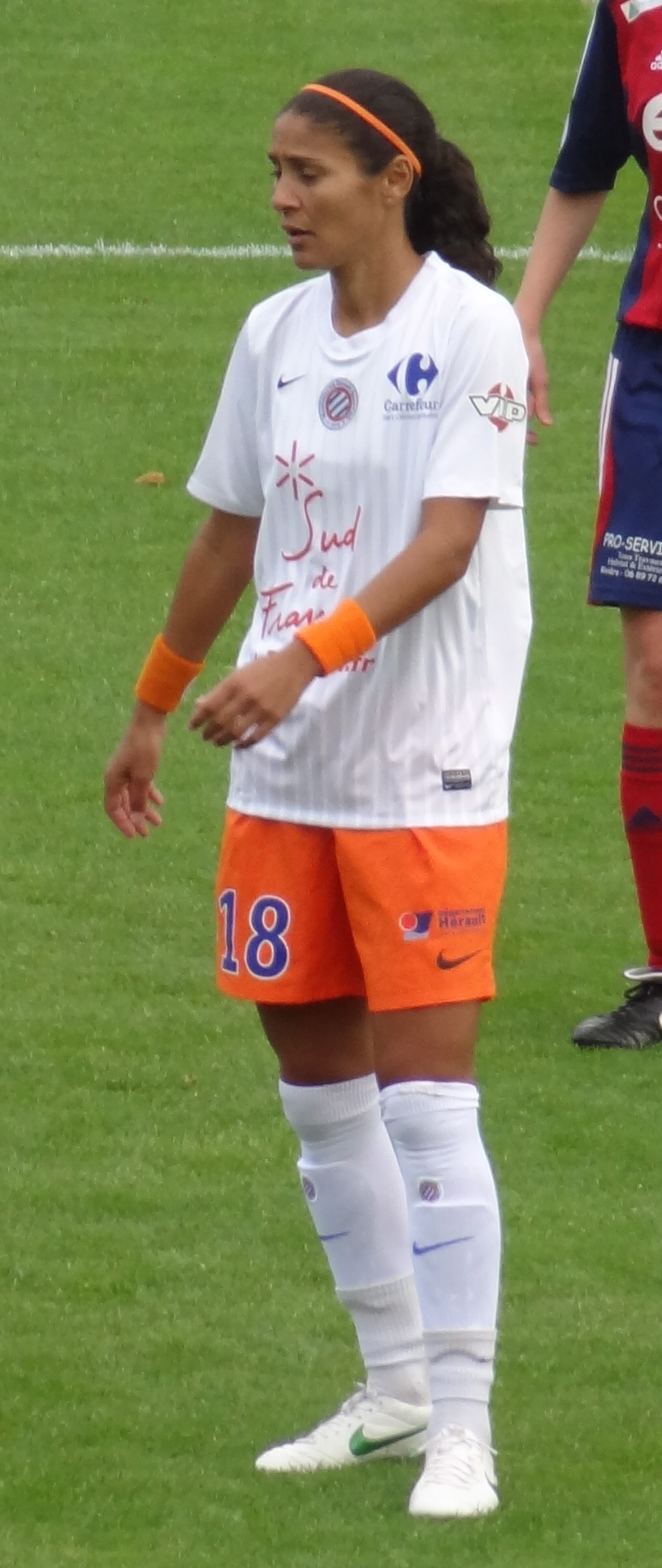

Personal information
- Full name: Hoda Lattaf
- Date of birth: 31 August 1978 (age 48)
- Place of birth: Bordeaux, France
- Position: Forward

Senior career*
Years	Team	Apps	(Gls)
1997–1998	FC Lyon		
1998–2001	La Roche ESOF		
2001–2006	Montpellier HSC		
2006–2008	Lyon	43	(41)
2008–2014	Montpellier	60	(29)

International career
1997–2007	France	112	(31)
- * Club domestic league appearances and goals

Hoda Lattaf (born 31 August 1978) is a former French football player who plays as forward. She last played for Montpellier in the top French league and is one of the leading players for the France national team, and was seen as the preferred partner for Marinette Pichon until the latter decided to retire from international soccer.

== Club career ==
Lattaf joined Olympique Lyonnais in the summer of 2006, after 6 seasons with Montpellier HSC, during which she won the title in 2004 and 2005. Lattaf was the second highest scorer in the 2005/2006 season after Marinette Pichon.

== International career ==
Since making her debut on 22 November 1997, Lattaf has played 98 time for her country, scoring 26 goals (as of 26 May 2006), and appeared in the 2001 UEFA Championships, the 2003 World Cup and the 2005 UEFA Championships. The France team failed to qualify for the 2007 World Cup after Lattaf scored an own goal against England on 30 September 2006.

== International goals ==
No.	Date	Venue	Opponent	Score	Result	Competition
1.	15 February 1998	Alençon, France	England	3–2	3–2	Friendly
2.	2 May 1998	Bruay-la-Buissière, France	Switzerland	2–0	3–0	1999 FIFA Women's World Cup qualification
3.	2 May 1998	Bruay-la-Buissière, France	Switzerland	3–0	3–0	1999 FIFA Women's World Cup qualification
4.	14 May 1998	Cesson-Sévigné, France	Algeria	9–0	14–0	Friendly
5.	20 March 1999	Bonneuil-sur-Marne, France	Austria	3–1	4–1	Friendly
6.	15 April 2000	Castanet-Tolosan, France	Netherlands	2–1	2–1	UEFA Women's Euro 2001 qualifying
7.	18 November 2000	Mérignac, France	Greece	2–0	3–0	Friendly
8.	11 January 2001	Coffs Harbour, Australia	Australia	1–2	1–2	Friendly
9.	17 March 2001	Quimper, France	Scotland	3–0	5–0	Friendly
10.	17 March 2001	Quimper, France	Scotland	4–0	5–0	Friendly
11.	11 April 2001	Troyes, France	Sweden	2–1	2–1	Friendly
12.	15 April 2001	Montaigu-Vendée, France	Switzerland	1–0	1–1	Friendly
13.	14 August 2002	Clairefontaine-en-Yvelines, France	Switzerland	1–0	1–2	Friendly
14.	18 March 2003	Albufeira, Portugal	Finland	1–0	1–0	2003 Algarve Cup
15.	11 May 2003	Kecskemét, Hungary	Hungary	2–0	4–0	UEFA Women's Euro 2005 qualifying
16.	11 May 2003	Kecskemét, Hungary	Hungary	4–0	4–0	UEFA Women's Euro 2005 qualifying
17.	15 November 2003	Quimper, France	Poland	6–0	7–1	UEFA Women's Euro 2005 qualifying
18.	16 March 2004	Quarteira, Portugal	Sweden	1–0	3–0	2004 Algarve Cup
19.	16 May 2004	Selyatino, Russia	Russia	1–0	3–0	UEFA Women's Euro 2005 qualifying
20.	2 June 2004	Reykjavík, Iceland	Iceland	1–0	3–0	UEFA Women's Euro 2005 qualifying
21.	2 June 2004	Reykjavík, Iceland	Iceland	2–0	3–0	UEFA Women's Euro 2005 qualifying
22.	26 September 2004	Dijon, France	Russia	2–4	2–5	UEFA Women's Euro 2005 qualifying
23.	15 March 2005	Faro, Portugal	Sweden	3–2	3–2	2005 Algarve Cup
24.	6 June 2005	Preston, England	Italy	1–0	3–1	UEFA Women's Euro 2005
25.	13 March 2006	Faro, Portugal	United States	1–3	1–4	2006 Algarve Cup
26.	22 April 2006	Dunaujvaros, Hungary	Hungary	5–0	5–0	2007 FIFA Women's World Cup qualification
27.	29 August 2006	Dieppe, France	Canada	2–2	2–2	Friendly
28.	22 November 2006	Boulogne-sur-Mer, France	Belgium	1–0	6–0	Friendly
29.	11 April 2007	Valence, France	Greece	6–0	6–0	UEFA Women's Euro 2009 qualifying
30.	30 May 2007	Angoulême, France	Slovenia	4–0	6–0	UEFA Women's Euro 2009 qualifying
31.	30 May 2007	Angoulême, France	Slovenia	5–0	6–0	UEFA Women's Euro 2009 qualifying
