= FF Yzeure Allier Auvergne =

Football Féminin Yzeure Allier Auvergne
- Full name: Football Club Féminin Nord Allier Yzeure
- Founded: 1999
- Ground: Stade Serge Mesonès & Stade de Bellevue
- President: Dominique Darnet
- Manager: Ophélie Meilleroux
- League: D2 Féminine
- 2020/2021: 2nd
Home colours	Away colours

Football Féminin Yzeure Allier Auvergne, formerly named FCF Nord Allier Yzeure, is a French women's football club founded in 1999 based in Yzeure. It was promoted to D1 Féminine for the first time in its history following the conclusion of the 2007–2008 season. Its best result in the championship so far is a fifth place. It has also reached the national cup's quarterfinals twice.

== Current squad ==
As of 23 March 2022.

Note: Flags indicate national team as defined under FIFA eligibility rules; some limited exceptions apply. Players may hold more than one non-FIFA nationality.

No.	Pos.	Nation	Player
2	DF	CMR	Christine Manie
4	DF	FRA	Nesrine Barka
5	DF	FRA	Tifanie De Sousa
8	MF	FRA	Maëlys Goumeziane
11	FW	TOG	Sabine Woedikou
13	MF	FRA	Laura Douet

No.	Pos.	Nation	Player
14	MF	FRA	Manon Olivier
17	DF	FRA	Charlène Turland
21	MF	FRA	Inès Ou Mahi
25	MF	FRA	Angélique Vayssié
27	FW	FRA	Aïcha Camara
28	MF	FRA	Tania Seddaoui
29	MF	FRA	Maëlys Rousset
30	GK	FRA	Clara Geneviève Anastasie
—	DF	CMR	Dolorès Tsadjia
—	FW	FRA	Aude N'Diaye
—	MF	FRA	Chloé Pimbert

== Honours ==
- D2 Féminine Champion: 2008

== Season to season ==
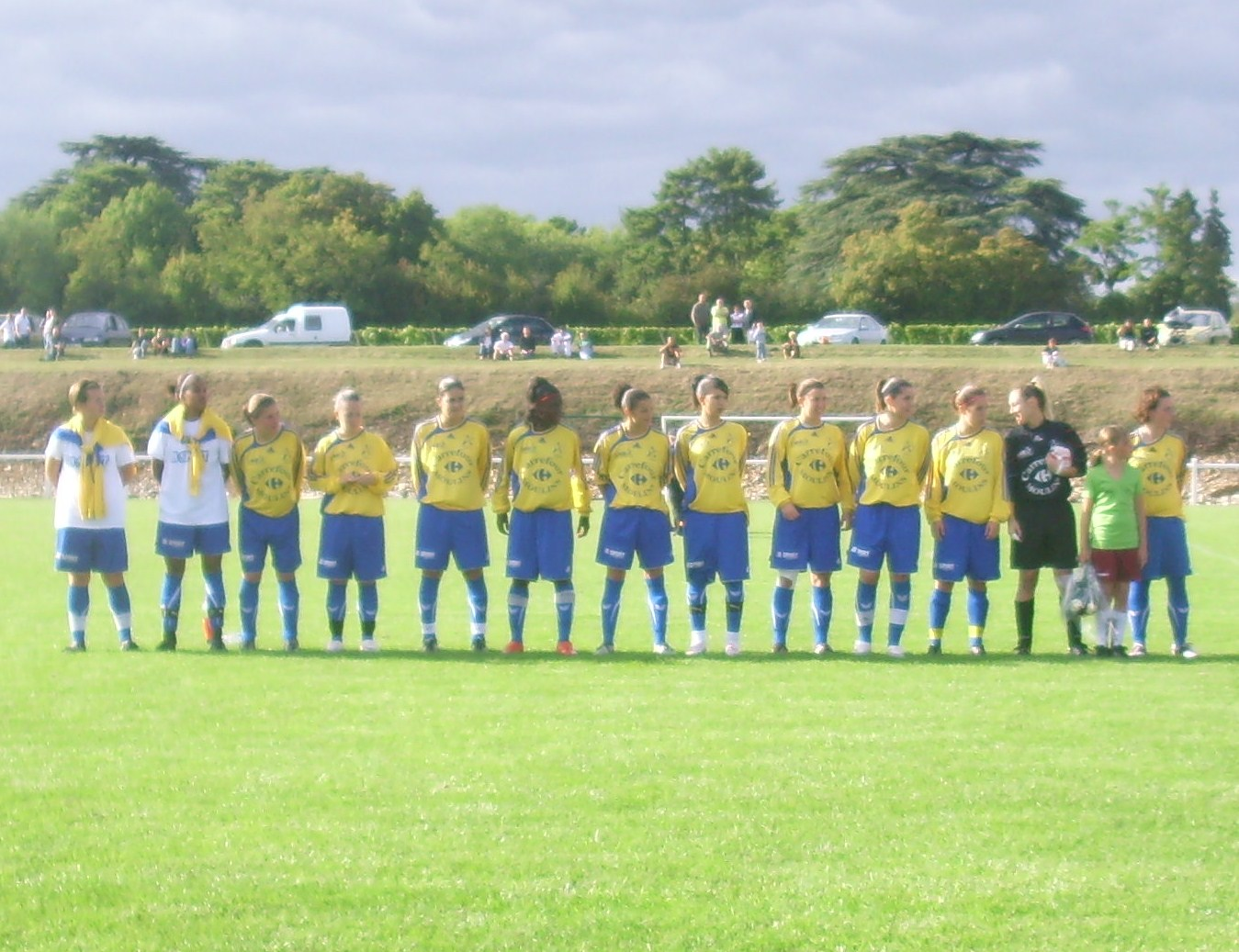
2009-2010 team in Mercurey for a friendly with FCF Juvisy.

Season	Division	Place	Coupe de France
2003–04	3 (Gr. B)	7th	
2004–05	3 (Gr. B)	4th	
2005–06	3 (Gr. B)	2nd	Round of 64
2006–07	2 (Gr. B)	5th	Round of 32
2007–08	2 (Gr. B)	1st	Round of 16
2008–09	1	5th	Quarterfinals
2009–10	1	5th	Round of 32
2010–11	1	9th	Quarterfinals
2011–12	1	9th	Round of 64
