= Coupe de France Féminine =

French football tournament

- Founded: 2001; 25 years ago
- Region: France
- Teams: 488 (2014–15)
- Domestic cup: Trophée des Championnes
- Current champions: Lyon (11th title)
- Most championships: Lyon (11 titles)
- Broadcaster(s): France Télévisions beIN Sports
- Website: Official site (in French)
- 2025–26 Coupe de France Féminine

The Coupe de France Féminine (French pronunciation: [kup də fʁɑ̃s feminin], Women's French Cup) is the top annual cup tournament for French women's football clubs. The competition is open to all professional and non-professional women's teams in France. Founded in 2001 as Challenge de France, the competition was renamed as Coupe de France féminine from the 2011–12 season.

Lyon holds the record for most titles overall, having won eleven times. They are also the current champions, having defeated Paris Saint-Germain in the most recent final on 10 May 2026.

== History ==
The inaugural Challenge de France was first held during the 2001–02 season. The competition coincided with the inaugural edition of the UEFA Women's Cup, which is now known as the UEFA Women's Champions League. The cup competition is the only tournament in France reserved for senior women's players. Participation in the competition varies. Regional clubs participation is voluntary, however, clubs who participate in D3 Féminine on up participation is mandatory unless unforeseen circumstances prohibit their appearance.

== List of finals ==
The following is a list of Coupe de France féminine seasons and final results.

| Season | Winners | Score | Runners-up | Venue |
|---|---|---|---|---|
| 2001–02 | Toulouse | 2–1 | FC Lyon | Stade Léon Sausset |
| 2002–03 | FC Lyon | 4–3 | Montpellier | Stade des Alouettes |
| 2003–04 | FC Lyon | 2–0 | Compiègne | Stade Alexandre Cueille |
| 2004–05 | Juvisy | 1–1 (5–4 p) | Olympique Lyonnais | Stade de la Tête Noire |
| 2005–06 | Montpellier | 1–1 (4–3 p) | Olympique Lyonnais | Stade Pierre Ducourtial |
| 2006–07 | Montpellier | 3–3 (3–0 p) | Olympique Lyonnais | Stade Auguste-Delaune |
| 2007–08 | Olympique Lyonnais | 3–0 | Paris Saint-Germain | Stade de France |
| 2008–09 | Montpellier | 3–1 | Le Mans | Stade de Gerland |
| 2009–10 | Paris Saint-Germain | 5–0 | Montpellier | Stade Robert Bobin |
| 2010–11 | Saint-Étienne | 0–0 (3–2 p) | Montpellier | Stade de la Pépinière |
| 2011–12 | Olympique Lyonnais | 2–1 | Montpellier | Stade Jacques Rimbault |
| 2012–13 | Olympique Lyonnais | 3–1 | Saint-Étienne | Stade Gabriel Montpied |
| 2013–14 | Olympique Lyonnais | 2–0 | Paris Saint-Germain | MMArena |
| 2014–15 | Olympique Lyonnais | 2–1 | Montpellier | Stade de l'Épopée |
| 2015–16 | Olympique Lyonnais | 2–1 | Montpellier | Stade des Alpes |
| 2016–17 | Olympique Lyonnais | 1–1 (7–6 p) | Paris Saint-Germain | Stade de la Rabine |
| 2017–18 | Paris Saint-Germain | 1–0 | Olympique Lyonnais | Stade de la Meinau |
| 2018–19 | Olympique Lyonnais | 3–1 | Lille | Stade Gaston-Petit |
| 2019–20 | Olympique Lyonnais | 0–0 (4–3 p) | Paris Saint-Germain | Stade de l'Abbé-Deschamps |
| 2020–21 | Tournament abandoned due to COVID-19 pandemic in France | | | |
| 2021–22 | Paris Saint-Germain | 8–0 | Yzeure | Stade Gaston Gérard |
| 2022–23 | Olympique Lyonnais | 2–1 | Paris Saint-Germain | Stade de la Source |
| 2023–24 | Paris Saint-Germain | 1–0 | Fleury | Stade de la Mosson |
| 2024–25 | Paris FC | 0–0 (5–4 p) | Paris Saint-Germain | Stade de l'Épopée |
| 2025–26 | OL Lyonnes | 4–1 | Paris Saint-Germain | Stade du Hainaut |

== Performance by club ==
| Club | Winners | Runners-up | Winning seasons | Runner-up seasons |
|---|---|---|---|---|
| OL Lyonnes | 11 | 4 | 2007–08, 2011–12, 2012–13, 2013–14, 2014–15, 2015–16, 2016–17, 2018–19, 2019–20, 2022–23, 2025–26 | 2004–05, 2005–06, 2006–07, 2017–18 |
| Paris Saint-Germain | 4 | 7 | 2009–10, 2017–18, 2021–22, 2023–24 | 2007–08, 2013–14, 2016–17, 2019–20, 2022–23, 2024–25, 2025–26 |
| Montpellier | 3 | 6 | 2005–06, 2006–07, 2008–09 | 2002–03, 2009–10, 2010–11, 2011–12, 2014–15, 2015–16 |
| FC Lyon | 2 | 1 | 2002–03, 2003–04 | 2001–02 |
| Paris FC / Juvisy | 2 | 0 | 2004–05, 2024–25 | |
| Saint-Étienne | 1 | 1 | 2010–11 | 2012–13 |
| Toulouse | 1 | 0 | 2001–02 | |
| Compiègne | 0 | 1 | | 2003–04 |
| Le Mans | 0 | 1 | | 2008–09 |
| Lille | 0 | 1 | | 2018–19 |
| Yzeure | 0 | 1 | | 2021–22 |
| FC Fleury 91 | 0 | 1 | | 2023–24 |
