= List of France women's international footballers =

The France women's national football team (French: Equipe de France Féminine) represents the nation of France in international women's football. It is fielded by the French Football Federation (FFF) (French: Fédération Française de Football), the governing body of football in France, and competes as a member of the UEFA.

The team played its first official international match under FFF jurisdiction on 17 April 1971 against the Netherlands. Since its first competitive match under the federation, more than 300 players have made at least one official appearance for the team. On 11 May 2003, Corinne Diacre became the first player to play 100 official matches for the team. Since then, 19 more players have reached this milestone.

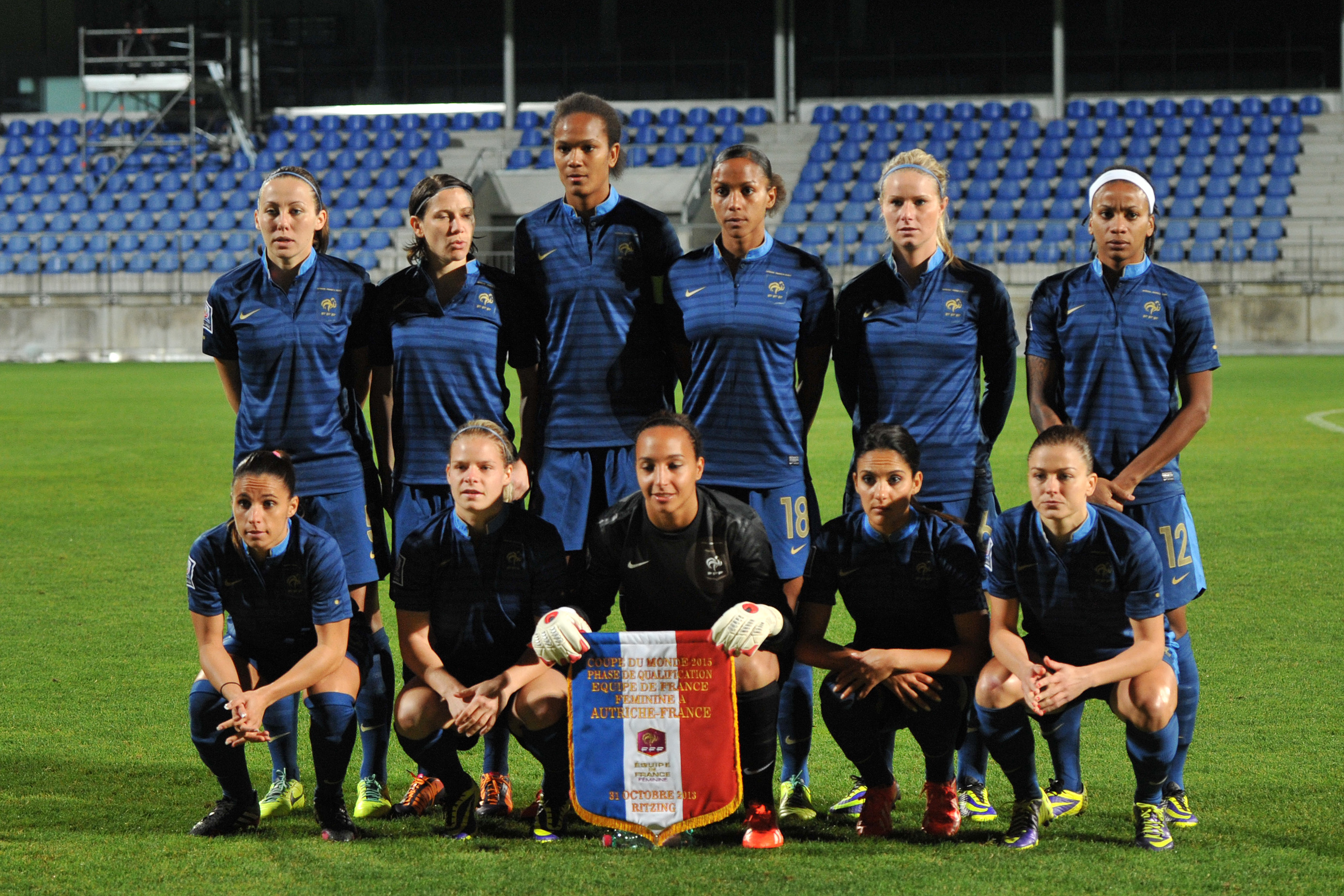
France lineup ahead of a 2015 FIFA Women's World Cup qualification match against Austria

== List of players ==
Note: Players are listed by number of caps, then number of goals scored. Players are listed alphabetically if number of goals are equal.

Key
§	Player is active in international football and has been called up to the squad within the last 24 months

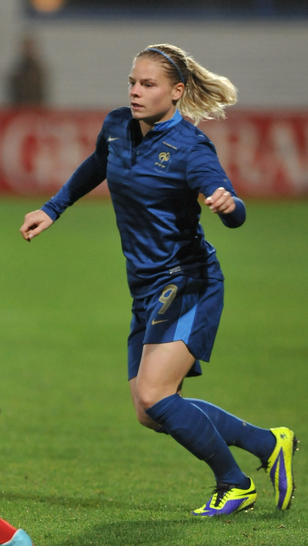
Eugénie Le Sommer (200 caps, 94 goals) is France's all-time leading goal scorer and most capped player.

Player	Caps	Goals	First cap	Last cap	Ref
Eugénie Le Sommer	200	94	2009	2025	
Sandrine Soubeyrand	198	17	1997	2013	
Élise Bussaglia	192	30	2003	2019	
Laura Georges	188	7	2001	2018	
Camille Abily	183	37	2001	2017	
Wendie Renard	168	39	2011	2025	
Gaëtane Thiney	163	58	2007	2019	
Sonia Bompastor	156	19	2000	2012	
Sarah Bouhaddi	149	0	2004	2020	
Louisa Nécib	145	36	2005	2016	
Élodie Thomis	141	32	2005	2017	
Kadidiatou Diani	127	33	2014	2026	
Marie-Laure Delie	123	65	2009	2017	
Corinne Diacre	121	14	1993	2005	
Stéphanie Mugneret-Béghé	116	15	1992	2005	
Grace Geyoro	114	24	2017	2026	
Marinette Pichon	112	81	1994	2006	
Hoda Lattaf	111	31	1997	2007	
Amandine Henry	109	14	2009	2024	
Sakina Karchaoui	103	6	2016	2026	
Griedge Mbock Bathy	99	9	2013	2026	
Sabrina Viguier	93	1	2000	2012	
Peggy Provost	91	2	1998	2006	
Corine Franco	89	11	2003	2014	
Delphine Cascarino	86	16	2016	2026	
Candie Herbert	83	11	1994	2010	
Amel Majri	82	13	2014	2025	
Emmanuelle Sykora	82	10	1992	2004	
Élodie Woock	78	4	1995	2004	
Pauline Peyraud-Magnin	77	0	2019	2026	
Kenza Dali	76	13	2014	2025	
Sandie Toletti	72	4	2013	2025	
Sandrine Roux	71	0	1983	2000	
Marie-Antoinette Katoto	67	44	2018	2026	
Ophélie Meilleroux	67	0	2003	2013	
Laëtitia Tonazzi	66	15	2002	2014	
Viviane Asseyi	66	14	2013	2023	
Laure Boulleau	65	0	2005	2016	
Céline Deville	65	0	2002	2015	
Jessica Houara	64	3	2008	2017	
Hélène Hillion-Guillemin	62	2	1988	1997	
Ève Périsset	61	4	2016	2024	
Aline Riera	60	0	1993	2002	
Sandy Baltimore	58	12	2020	2026	
Françoise Jézéquel	56	14	1988	2001	
Charlotte Bilbault	56	2	2015	2023	
Selma Bacha	55	3	2021	2026	
Élisa De Almeida	52	5	2019	2026	
Angélique Roujas	51	14	1995	2001	
Marion Torrent	51	1	2017	2022	
Clara Matéo	50	11	2020	2026	
Anne Zenoni	50	6	1992	2001	
Sandrine Dusang	47	1	2003	2011	
Cécile Locatelli	46	2	1992	1998	
Bernadette Constantin	45	4	1978	1994	
Marie-Ange Kramo	44	0	1999	2009	
Melvine Malard	42	15	2020	2026	
Sophie Ryckeboer-Charrier	42	0	1980	1990	
Isabelle Musset	41	15	1976	1990	
Gaëlle Blouin	41	4	1991	2002	
Kheira Hamraoui	41	3	2012	2023	
Maëlle Lakrar	41	3	2023	2026	
Élisabeth Loisel	41	3	1980	1989	
Aïssatou Tounkara	40	3	2016	2022	
Céline Marty	40	0	1997	2003	
Ludivine Diguelman	39	3	2002	2009	
Sabrina Delannoy	39	1	2012	2016	
Véronique Nowak	39	1	1985	1994	
Régine Mismacq	38	9	1984	1992	
Laure Lepailleur	38	2	2005	2011	
Valérie Gauvin	37	17	2015	2021	
Marie-Christine Umdenstock	37	0	1986	1992	
Michèle Wolf	36	9	1972	1986	
Claire Lavogez	35	3	2014	2017	
Brigitte Olive	32	2	1988	1997	
Camille Catala	31	3	2011	2017	
Marie-Angèle Blin	31	2	1985	1992	
Jocelyne Gout	30	4	1993	1997	
Isabelle Le Boulch	29	8	1985	1992	
Ouleymata Sarr	28	9	2017	2023	
Anne-Laure Casseleux	28	0	2003	2008	
Sylvie Baracat	27	1	1983	1991	
Oriane Jean-François	27	0	2020	2026	
Corinne Lagache	27	0	1998	2001	
Marie-Agnès Annequin-Plantagenet	26	3	1978	1987	
Sylvie Josset	26	0	1984	1991	
Myriam Bernauer	25	2	1987	1993	
Marielle Breton	24	3	1987	1996	
Ghislaine Baron	24	1	1989	1993	
Florence Rimbault	24	1	1979	1988	
Nathalie Tarade	24	0	1988	1992	
Fabienne Prieux	23	1	1992	1999	
Bérangère Sapowicz	23	0	2003	2011	
Sandrine Brétigny	22	9	2006	2013	
Sandrine Fusier	21	7	1992	1996	
Vicki Bècho	21	2	2023	2026	
Sylvie Bailly	21	1	1975	1983	
Marie-Noëlle Warot-Fourdrignier	21	0	1977	1986	
Marie-Louise Butzig	20	0	1971	1980	

== See also ==
- France women's national football team
- Category:French women's footballers
- France women's national football team current squad
- Women's football in France
