= Wendie Renard =

French footballer (born 1990)

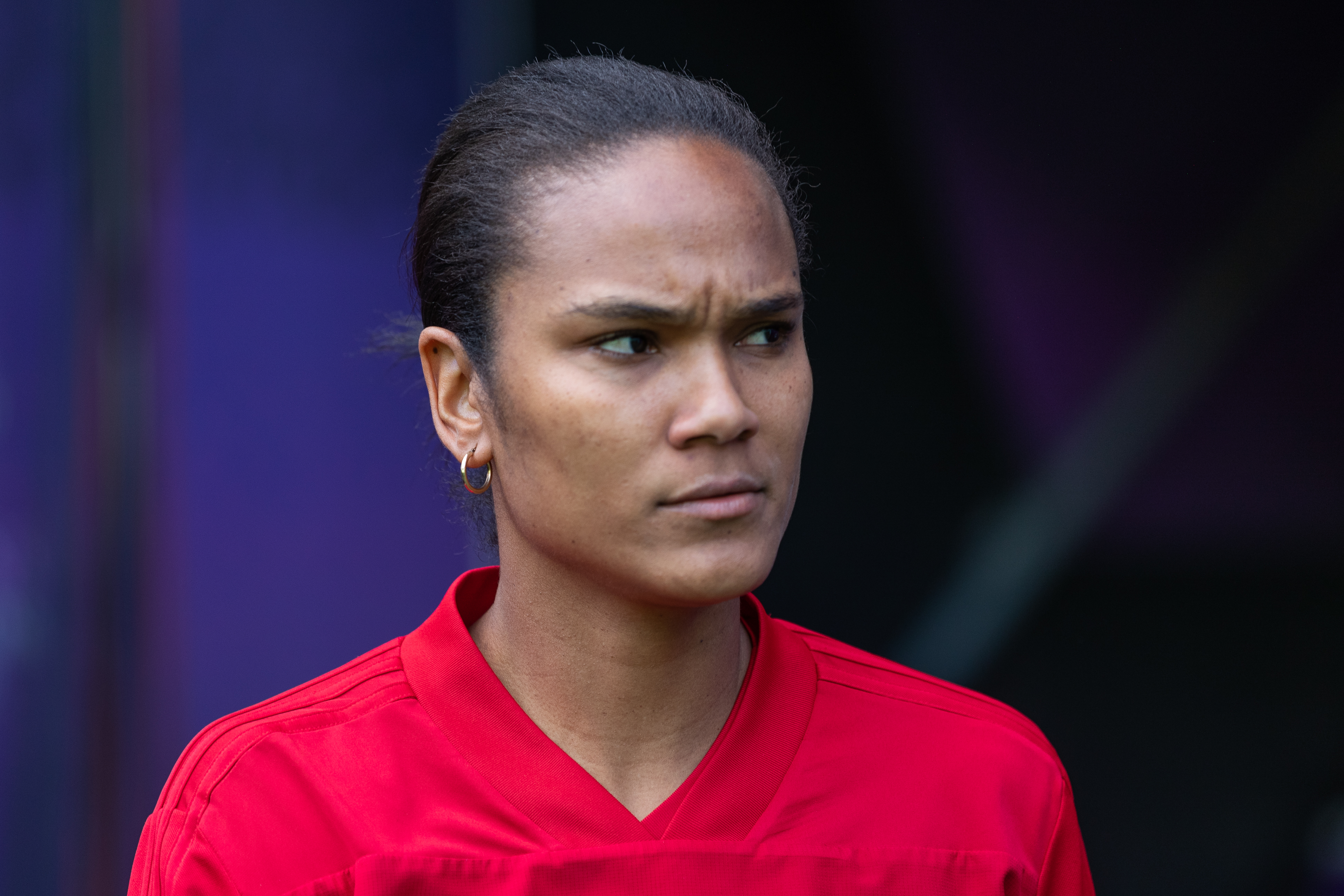
- Renard in 2019

Personal information
- Full name: Wendie Thérèse Renard
- Date of birth: 20 July 1990 (age 36)
- Place of birth: Schœlcher, Martinique, France
- Height: 1.87 m (6 ft 2 in)
- Position: Centre-back

Team information
- Current team: Lyon
- Number: 3

Youth career
- 1997–2005: Essor-Préchotain
- 2005–2006: Rapid Club du Lorrain

Senior career*
| Years | Team | Apps | (Gls) |
| 2006– | Lyon | 328 | (104) |

International career^{‡}
| 2007–2009 | France U19 | 18 | (0) |
| 2008–2010 | France U20 | 7 | (0) |
| 2011– | France | 168 | (39) |
- * Club domestic league appearances and goals as of 22 November 2026 ‡ National team caps and goals as of 25 February 2025

Wendeleine Thérèse Renard (born 20 July 1990) is a French professional footballer who plays as a centre-back for Première Ligue club Lyon and the France national team.

Renard is one of the most decorated players in modern women's club football. She has won a record 19 French league titles and eight European Cups. In 2019, the New York Times described her as an "institution" at Lyon, the most successful club in European women's football.

== Early life ==
Renard was born in Schœlcher in Martinique, a French island in the Lesser Antilles. She is the youngest of 4 daughters. Her father died of lung cancer when she was eight years old. Prior to moving to the mainland, Renard played for Essor-Préchotain on her home island.

When she was 15, Renard flew to mainland France for a trial at Clairefontaine but was not accepted into the national training program. She subsequently took the train to Lyon and, after a more successful trial, landed a spot with Lyon. She left Martinique to permanently live in Lyon at the age of sixteen.

== Club career ==
Renard made her debut at L'Essor Préchotin at the age of seven and then played for Rapid Club Le Lorrain. In 2006, Farid Benstiti, then coach of Olympique Lyon, brought Wendie Renard into the club's youth center and used the 16-year-old in two league games in the top league at the end of the same season. Three months later she was called up to the youth national team for the first time.

Renard joined Lyon in 2006 and, since the 2007–08 season, has been a regular within the starting eleven winning fourteen consecutive league titles from 2006 to 2020, as well numerous Challenge de France trophies. In 2010, Renard featured in the final match of the UEFA Women's Champions League and, in the 2010–11 edition, helped Lyon win the competition. She scored the opening goal in a 2–0 win over Turbine Potsdam in the final.

On 26 August 2020, she scored the winning goal in a 1–0 win against Paris Saint-Germain in the 2019–20 UEFA Women's Champions League semi-finals, to eventually win the competition for the seventh time in her career.

== International career ==
Renard is a former youth international having played at under-19 and under-20 level. She made her debut for the France national team at the 2011 Cyprus Cup in a match against Switzerland. Renard has since represented France in two FIFA World Cups and two Olympics, and was the team captain from September 2013. She was stripped of the captaincy after the Euro 2017 tournament and was ultimately succeeded by Amandine Henry. Renard regained the captaincy in September 2021.

At the 2019 World Cup on home soil, Renard scored three goals in the group stage: a brace against South Korea and a penalty against Nigeria. She also scored an own goal against Norway. Renard scored a consolation goal in France's 2–1 quarter-final defeat to the United States. The 6 foot 2 inch-tall defender was the tallest player at that edition of the World Cup.

On 24 February 2023, Renard announced she would not play at the World Cup later that year to "preserve her mental health". According to a report in French multimedia outlet RMC Sport, Renard had decided not play for the national team as long as then-coach Corinne Diacre was in charge. After Diacre was sacked in early March 2023, Renard said she was open to a return to the team if selected. When Hervé Renard (no relation) succeeded Diacre as France's head coach at the end of March, he immediately invited Renard to rejoin the national squad.

Renard accepted the invitation to resume playing for France and serving as captain. In France's second match of the 2023 FIFA World Cup group stage, she scored the winning goal against Brazil. In the quarterfinals of the World Cup tournament, France saw a goal called back after Renard was charged with a jersey-pulling foul on an Australian player, and ultimately lost to Australia in a penalty kick shoot-out.

In July 2024, Renard was named in France's squad for the 2024 Olympics. However, she was not chosen by coach Laurent Bonadei for the Euro 2025 squad.

== Style of play ==
As a defender, Renard is physically strong, with good pace and technique, and is noted for scoring powerful headers.

== Personal life ==
Renard is a devout Roman Catholic who met Pope Francis in 2021.

== Career statistics ==
=== Club ===
As of match played 26 April 2026

Appearances and goals by club, season and competition
| Club | Season | League | | | Cup | | Continental | | Other | | Total | |
| Club | Season | Division | Apps | Goals | Apps | Goals | Apps | Goals | Apps | Goals | Apps | Goals |
|---|---|---|---|---|---|---|---|---|---|---|---|---|
| Lyon | 2006–07 | Division 1 Féminine | 2 | 0 | 1 | 0 | 0 | 0 | — | | 3 | 0 |
| Lyon | 2007–08 | Division 1 Féminine | 14 | 2 | 3 | 1 | 6 | 2 | — | | 23 | 5 |
| Lyon | 2008–09 | Division 1 Féminine | 19 | 2 | 3 | 0 | 4 | 0 | — | | 26 | 2 |
| Lyon | 2009–10 | Division 1 Féminine | 20 | 6 | 3 | 0 | 9 | 0 | — | | 32 | 6 |
| Lyon | 2010–11 | Division 1 Féminine | 20 | 2 | 3 | 0 | 9 | 3 | — | | 32 | 5 |
| Lyon | 2011–12 | Division 1 Féminine | 20 | 9 | 4 | 1 | 8 | 1 | — | | 32 | 11 |
| Lyon | 2012–13 | Division 1 Féminine | 13 | 3 | 6 | 2 | 7 | 3 | — | | 26 | 8 |
| Lyon | 2013–14 | Division 1 Féminine | 19 | 7 | 6 | 1 | 4 | 0 | — | | 29 | 8 |
| Lyon | 2014–15 | Division 1 Féminine | 21 | 10 | 4 | 1 | 4 | 1 | — | | 29 | 12 |
| Lyon | 2015–16 | Division 1 Féminine | 15 | 6 | 3 | 4 | 6 | 1 | — | | 24 | 11 |
| Lyon | 2016–17 | Division 1 Féminine | 16 | 6 | 4 | 0 | 8 | 2 | — | | 28 | 8 |
| Lyon | 2017–18 | Division 1 Féminine | 17 | 5 | 5 | 3 | 8 | 4 | — | | 30 | 12 |
| Lyon | 2018–19 | Division 1 Féminine | 17 | 8 | 4 | 2 | 9 | 4 | — | | 30 | 14 |
| Lyon | 2019–20 | Division 1 Féminine | 14 | 7 | 5 | 2 | 6 | 5 | 1 (Note: Appearance(s) in the Trophée des Championnes.) | 0 | 26 | 14 |
| Lyon | 2020–21 | Division 1 Féminine | 20 | 10 | 1 | 1 | 5 | 4 | — | | 26 | 15 |
| Lyon | 2021–22 | Division 1 Féminine | 16 | 2 | 2 | 2 | 9 | 3 | — | | 27 | 7 |
| Lyon | 2022–23 | Division 1 Féminine | 21 | 7 | 5 | 1 | 8 | 0 | 0 | 0 | 34 | 8 |
| Lyon | 2023–24 | Division 1 Féminine | 14 | 6 | 0 | 0 | 6 | 0 | 1 | 0 | 21 | 6 |
| Lyon | 2024–25 | Division 1 Féminine | 17 | 5 | 0 | 0 | 9 | 3 | 0 | 0 | 26 | 8 |
| Lyon | 2025–26 | Division 1 Féminine | 11 | 2 | 2 | 2 | 5 | 3 | 0 | 0 | 18 | 7 |
| Career total | | | 325 | 107 | 62 | 21 | 118 | 34 | 2 | 0 | 507 | 161 |

=== International ===
As of match played 25 February 2025

Appearances and goals by national team and year
| National team | Year | Apps | Goals |
|---|---|---|---|
| France | 2011 | 13 | 1 |
| France | 2012 | 19 | 5 |
| France | 2013 | 14 | 9 |
| France | 2014 | 14 | 1 |
| France | 2015 | 15 | 1 |
| France | 2016 | 9 | 1 |
| France | 2017 | 14 | 1 |
| France | 2018 | 6 | 1 |
| France | 2019 | 14 | 4 |
| France | 2020 | 4 | 1 |
| France | 2021 | 4 | 4 |
| France | 2022 | 13 | 4 |
| France | 2023 | 16 | 4 |
| France | 2024 | 12 | 2 |
| France | 2025 | 1 | 0 |
| Total | | 168 | 39 |

Scores and results list France's goal tally first, score column indicates score after each Renard goal.

List of international goals scored by Wendie Renard
| # | Date | Venue | Opponent | Score | Result | Competition |
|---|---|---|---|---|---|---|
| 1 | 20 November 2011 | Stade Pierre-Aliker, Fort-de-France, Martinique | Mexico | 5–0 | 5–0 | Friendly |
| 2 | 1 March 2012 | GSZ Stadium, Larnaca, Cyprus | Finland | 1–2 | 1–2 | 2012 Cyprus Cup |
| 3 | 31 March 2012 | Stade Jules Deschaseaux, Le Havre, France | Scotland | 2–0 | 2–0 | UEFA Women's Euro 2013 qualifying |
| 4 | 19 July 2012 | Stade Sébastien Charléty, Paris, France | Japan | 2–0 | 2–0 | Friendly |
| 5 | 28 July 2012 | Hampden Park, Glasgow, Scotland | North Korea | 4–0 | 5–0 | 2012 Summer Olympics |
| 6 | 3 August 2012 | Hampden Park, Glasgow, Scotland | Sweden | 1–2 | 1–2 | 2012 Summer Olympics |
| 7 | 15 July 2013 | Idrottsparken, Norrköping, Sweden | Spain | 0–1 | 0–1 | UEFA Women's Euro 2013 |
| 8 | 19 July 2013 | Linköping Arena, Linköping, Sweden | England | 3–0 | 3–0 | UEFA Women's Euro 2013 |
| 9 | 20 September 2013 | Stade Robert Bobin, Bondoufle, France | Czech Republic | 1–0 | 2–0 | Friendly |
| 10 | 25 October 2013 | Stade Pierre Brisson, Beauvais, France | Poland | 2–0 | 6–0 | Friendly |
| 11 | 31 October 2013 | Sonnensee Stadion, Ritzing, Austria | Austria | 1–3 | 1–3 | 2015 FIFA Women's World Cup qualification |
| 12 | 23 November 2013 | Lovech Stadium, Lovech, Bulgaria | Bulgaria | 0–5 | 0–10 | 2015 FIFA Women's World Cup qualification |
| 13 | 23 November 2013 | Lovech Stadium, Lovech, Bulgaria | Bulgaria | 0–6 | 0–10 | 2015 FIFA Women's World Cup qualification |
| 14 | 27 November 2013 | MMArena, Le Mans, France | Bulgaria | 6–0 | 14–0 | 2015 FIFA Women's World Cup qualification |
| 15 | 27 November 2013 | MMArena, Le Mans, France | Bulgaria | 8–0 | 14–0 | 2015 FIFA Women's World Cup qualification |
| 16 | 10 March 2014 | GSP Stadium, Nicosia, Cyprus | Netherlands | 0–3 | 0–3 | 2014 Cyprus Cup |
| 17 | 19 September 2015 | Stade Océane, Le Havre, France | Brazil | 1–0 | 2–1 | Friendly |
| 18 | 16 July 2016 | Stade Sébastien Charléty, Paris, France | China | 2–0 | 3–0 | Friendly |
| 19 | 1 March 2017 | Talen Energy Stadium, Chester, Pennsylvania, United States | England | 1–2 | 1–2 | 2017 SheBelieves Cup |
| 20 | 10 November 2018 | Allianz Riviera, Nice, France | Brazil | 3–0 | 3–1 | Friendly |
| 21 | 7 June 2019 | Parc des Princes, Paris, France | South Korea | 2–0 | 4–0 | 2019 FIFA Women's World Cup |
| 22 | 7 June 2019 | Parc des Princes, Paris, France | South Korea | 3–0 | 4–0 | 2019 FIFA Women's World Cup |
| 23 | 17 June 2019 | Roazhon Park, Rennes, France | Nigeria | 0–1 | 0–1 | 2019 FIFA Women's World Cup |
| 24 | 28 June 2019 | Parc des Princes, Paris, France | United States | 2–1 | 2–1 | 2019 FIFA Women's World Cup |
| 25 | 27 November 2020 | Stade du Roudourou, Guingamp, France | Austria | 1–0 | 3–0 | UEFA Women's Euro 2022 qualifying |
| 26 | 20 February 2021 | Stade Saint-Symphorien, Metz, France | Switzerland | 1–0 | 2–0 | Friendly |
| 27 | 23 February 2021 | Stade Saint-Symphorien, Metz, France | Switzerland | 1–0 | 2–0 | Friendly |
| 28 | 23 February 2021 | Stade Saint-Symphorien, Metz, France | Switzerland | 2–0 | 2–0 | Friendly |
| 29 | 17 September 2021 | Pampeloponnisiako Stadium, Patras, Greece | Greece | 0–10 | 0–10 | 2023 FIFA Women's World Cup qualification |
| 30 | 16 February 2022 | Stade Océane, Le Havre | Finland | 3–0 | 5–0 | 2022 Tournoi de France |
| 31 | 16 February 2022 | Stade Océane, Le Havre | Finland | 5–0 | 5–0 | 2022 Tournoi de France |
| 32 | 22 February 2022 | Stade Océane, Le Havre | Netherlands | 1–0 | 3–1 | 2022 Tournoi de France |
| 33 | 8 April 2022 | Parc y Scarlets, Llanelli, Wales | Wales | 0–1 | 1–2 | 2023 FIFA Women's World Cup qualification |
| 34 | 18 February 2023 | Stade Raymond Kopa, Angers, France | Uruguay | 3–1 | 5–1 | 2023 Tournoi de France |
| 35 | 29 July 2023 | Lang Park, Brisbane, Australia | Brazil | 2–1 | 2–1 | 2023 FIFA Women's World Cup |
| 36 | 26 September 2023 | Franz Horr Stadium, Vienna, Austria | Austria | 0–1 | 0–1 | 2023–24 UEFA Women's Nations League |
| 37 | 27 October 2023 | Ullevaal Stadion, Oslo, Norway | Norway | 1–2 | 1–2 | 2023–24 UEFA Women's Nations League |
| 38 | 9 April 2024 | Gamla Ullevi, Gothenburg, Sweden | Sweden | 0–1 | 0–1 | UEFA Women's Euro 2025 qualifying |
| 39 | 25 October 2024 | Stade Auguste-Bonal, Montbéliard, France | Jamaica | 2–0 | 3–0 | Friendly |
Correct as of 29 October 2024

== Honours ==
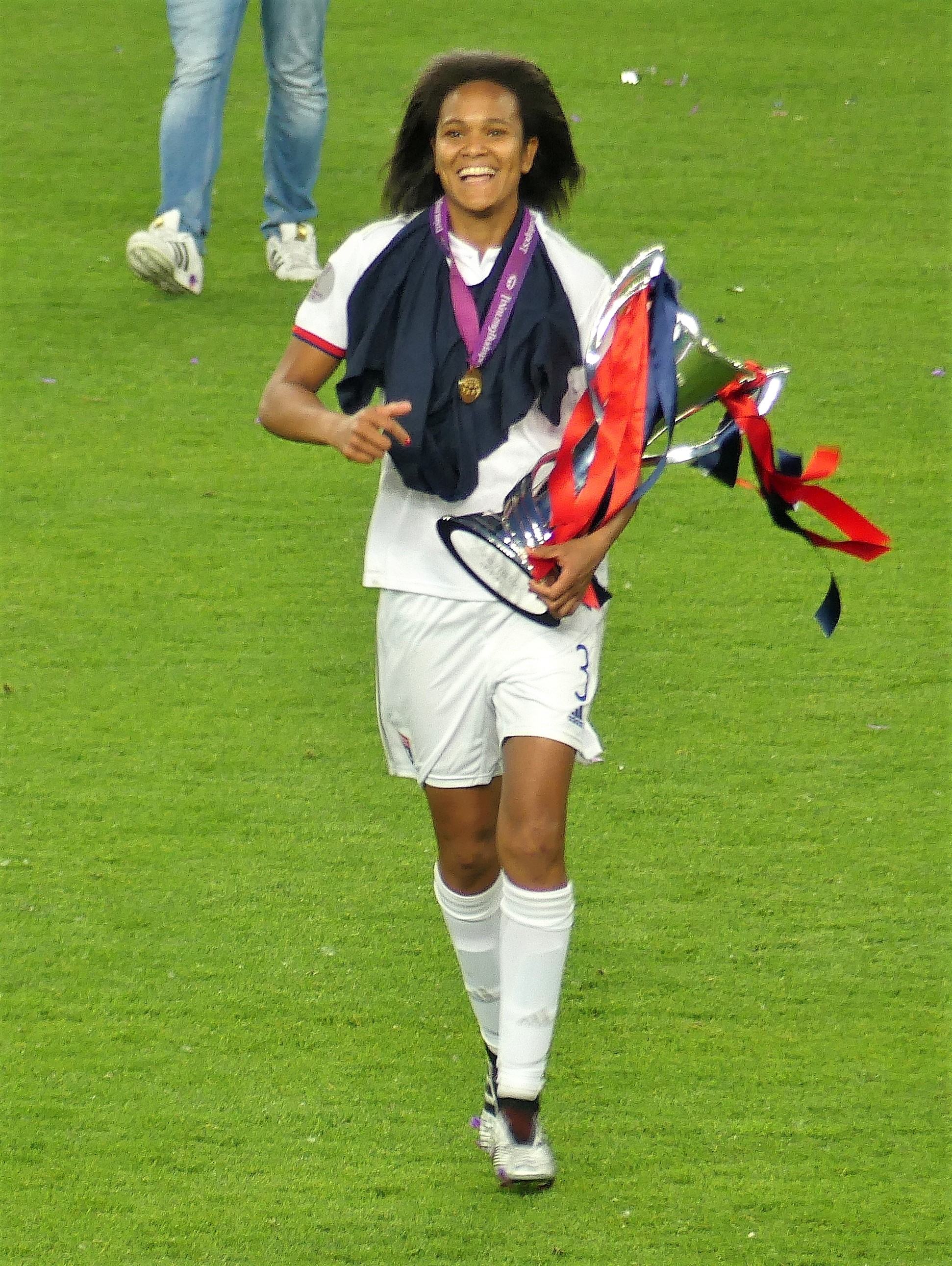
Renard with the UEFA Women's Champions League trophy after the 2019 final.

Lyon

- Première Ligue: 2006–07, 2007–08, 2008–09, 2009–10, 2010–11, 2011–12, 2012–13, 2013–14, 2014–15, 2015–16, 2016–17, 2017–18, 2018–19, 2019–20, 2021–22, 2022–23, 2023–24, 2024–25, 2025–26
- Coupe de France Féminine: 2007–08, 2011–12, 2012–13, 2013–14, 2014–15, 2015–16, 2016–17, 2018–19, 2019–20, 2022–23, 2025–26
- Coupe LFFP: 2025–26
- Trophée des Championnes: 2019, 2023
- UEFA Women's Champions League: 2010–11, 2011–12, 2015–16, 2016–17, 2017–18, 2018–19, 2019–20, 2021–22

Individual

- UEFA Women's Championship All-Star Team: 2013
- FIFA Women's World Cup All Star Team: 2015
- FIFA Women's World Cup Dream Team: 2015
- FIFPro: FIFA FIFPro World XI 2015, 2016, 2017, 2019, 2020, 2021, 2022
- IFFHS Women's World Team: 2017, 2018, 2019, 2020, 2021, 2022, 2023
- UEFA Champions League Defender of the Season: 2019–20
- IFFHS World's Woman Team of the Decade 2011–2020
- IFFHS UEFA Woman Team of the Decade 2011–2020

Orders

- Knight of the National Order of Merit: 2022

== See also ==
- List of women's footballers with 100 or more international caps
- List of players who have appeared in four or more FIFA Women's World Cups
- List of UEFA Women's Championship goalscorers
- List of UEFA Women's Champions League hat-tricks
- List of France women's international footballers
