= Francis-Pierre Coché =

French football coach (1924–2010)

Personal information
- Date of birth: 5 August 1924
- Place of birth: Libourne, France
- Date of death: 4 May 2010 (aged 85)
- Place of death: Martillac, France

Managerial career
- Years: Team
- 1978-1987: France

Francis-Pierre Coché (August 5, 1924 – May 4, 2010) was a French women's football coach. Coché coached the France women's national football team for 35 games, with 13 wins, 7 draws and 15 losses, and notably managed the team at the 1979 European Competition for Women's Football.

In 2022, Coché was accused of sexual harassment during his time as coach of the France national team which was uncovered by French journalist Romain Molina.
