= Hervé Renard =

French footballer and coach (born 1968)

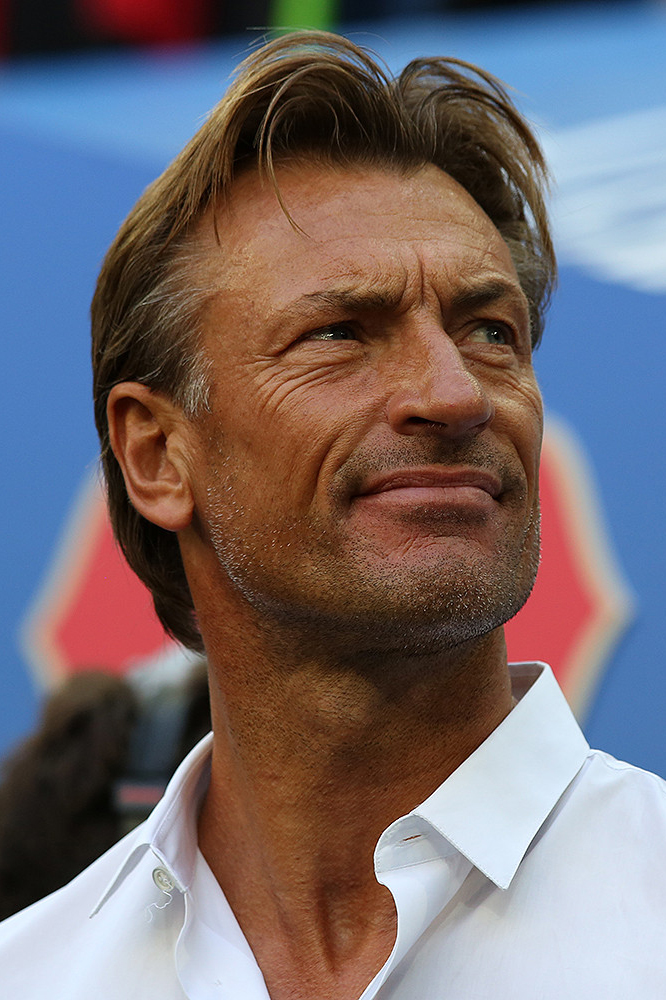
- Renard in 2018

Personal information
- Full name: Hervé Jean-Marie Roger Renard
- Date of birth: 30 September 1968 (age 58)
- Place of birth: Aix-les-Bains, France
- Position: Defender

Team information
- Current team: Ivory Coast (manager)

Senior career*
Years	Team	Apps	(Gls)
1983–1990	Cannes	87	(0)
1991–1997	Stade de Vallauris	105	(2)
1997–1998	Draguignan	23	(1)
Total		215	(3)

Managerial career
- 1999–2001: Draguignan
- 2004: Cambridge United
- 2004: Nam Dinh
- 2005–2007: Cherbourg
- 2008–2010: Zambia
- 2010: Angola
- 2011: USM Alger
- 2011–2013: Zambia
- 2013–2014: Sochaux
- 2014–2015: Ivory Coast
- 2015: Lille
- 2016–2019: Morocco
- 2019–2023: Saudi Arabia
- 2023–2024: France Women
- 2024–2026: Saudi Arabia
- 2026: Tunisia
- 2026–: Ivory Coast
Medal record
Men's football
Africa Cup of Nations
Representing Zambia (as manager)
Winner	2012
Representing Ivory Coast (as manager)
Winner	2015
FIFA Arab Cup
Representing Saudi Arabia (as manager)
Third place	2025
- * Club domestic league appearances and goals

Hervé Jean-Marie Roger Renard (French pronunciation: [ɛʁve ʁənaʁ]; born 30 September 1968) is a French professional football coach and former player who is the manager of the Ivory Coast national team.

Renard has previously been the manager of the Zambia national team, with whom he won the 2012 Africa Cup of Nations; he also won the competition in 2015 with the Ivory Coast, becoming the first coach to win two Africa Cup of Nations with different teams. In addition, he coached Morocco at the 2018 World Cup. From 2019 to 2023, he was the manager of Saudi Arabia before he became manager of the France women's team ahead of the 2023 FIFA Women's World Cup. In October 2024, he returned to Saudi Arabia for a second spell before being dismissed 18 months later. He was appointed on a short-term contract by Tunisia after the team lost their first match in the 2026 FIFA World Cup and departed the role after losing the remaining two games.

== Early life ==
Hervé Jean-Marie Roger Renard was born on 30 September 1968 in Aix-les-Bains, Auvergne-Rhône-Alpes. His maternal grandparents were from Poland.

== Playing career ==
Renard played as a defender for French clubs Cannes, Stade de Vallauris and Draguignan in a playing career which lasted from 1983 to 1998. After retiring as a professional player, he worked as a cleaner, working there in the morning and training with Draguignan in the evening, eventually starting his own cleaning company.

== Coaching career ==
=== Early years ===
Renard began his coaching career with Draguignan. He was an assistant at Chinese side Shanghai Cosco with head coach Claude Le Roy from 2002 to 2003, and managed English side Cambridge United in 2004, having first joined the club with Le Roy to serve as a coach.

He became manager of Vietnamese club Nam Dinh in 2004, leaving them after several months. He became manager of Cherbourg in 2005, leaving them in 2007. Next, he worked again with Le Roy as an assistant coach for the Ghana national side.

=== Zambia ===
In May 2008, Renard was appointed manager of the Zambia national team. At the 2010 Africa Cup of Nations, he led Zambia to the quarter final stage of the tournament for the first time in 14 years. Renard left his duties as Zambia manager in April 2010 with only two months remaining on his contract. Two days later, he agreed to become manager of Angola. He resigned from his position as Angola manager in October 2010, and was replaced by Zeca Amaral.

=== USM Alger ===
On 21 January 2011, Renard reached an agreement with Algerian club USM Alger to become the head coach of the club.

=== Second spell with Zambia ===
On 22 October 2011, it was announced that Renard had returned for a second stint as coach of Zambia on a one-year contract. He led the team to their first victory in the AFCON in 2012. The win was dedicated to the 18 players who perished in April 1993, after a plane carrying the squad crashed just miles from the site of the 2012 final in Gabon.

In May 2012, Chishimba Kambwili, the Zambian sports minister, announced he expected Renard to sign a new contract by the end of the month.

After Zambia were eliminated from the group stages of the 2013 Africa Cup of Nations, Renard said that it was his fault. He later criticised CAF for not allowing Zambia, as the 2012 winners of the AFCON, the chance to compete at the 2013 FIFA Confederations Cup.

Renard was released from his contract by the Football Association of Zambia in October 2013, in preparation for a role with French club Sochaux.

=== Sochaux ===
On 7 October 2013 it was announced that Renard was appointed as the new manager of French Ligue 1 side Sochaux. In April 2014, he was linked with the Morocco national team job.

The club was involved in a relegation fight in May 2014, and after being relegated, he left the club later that month. In July 2014, he was announced to be on the shortlist for the Ivory Coast job.

=== Ivory Coast ===
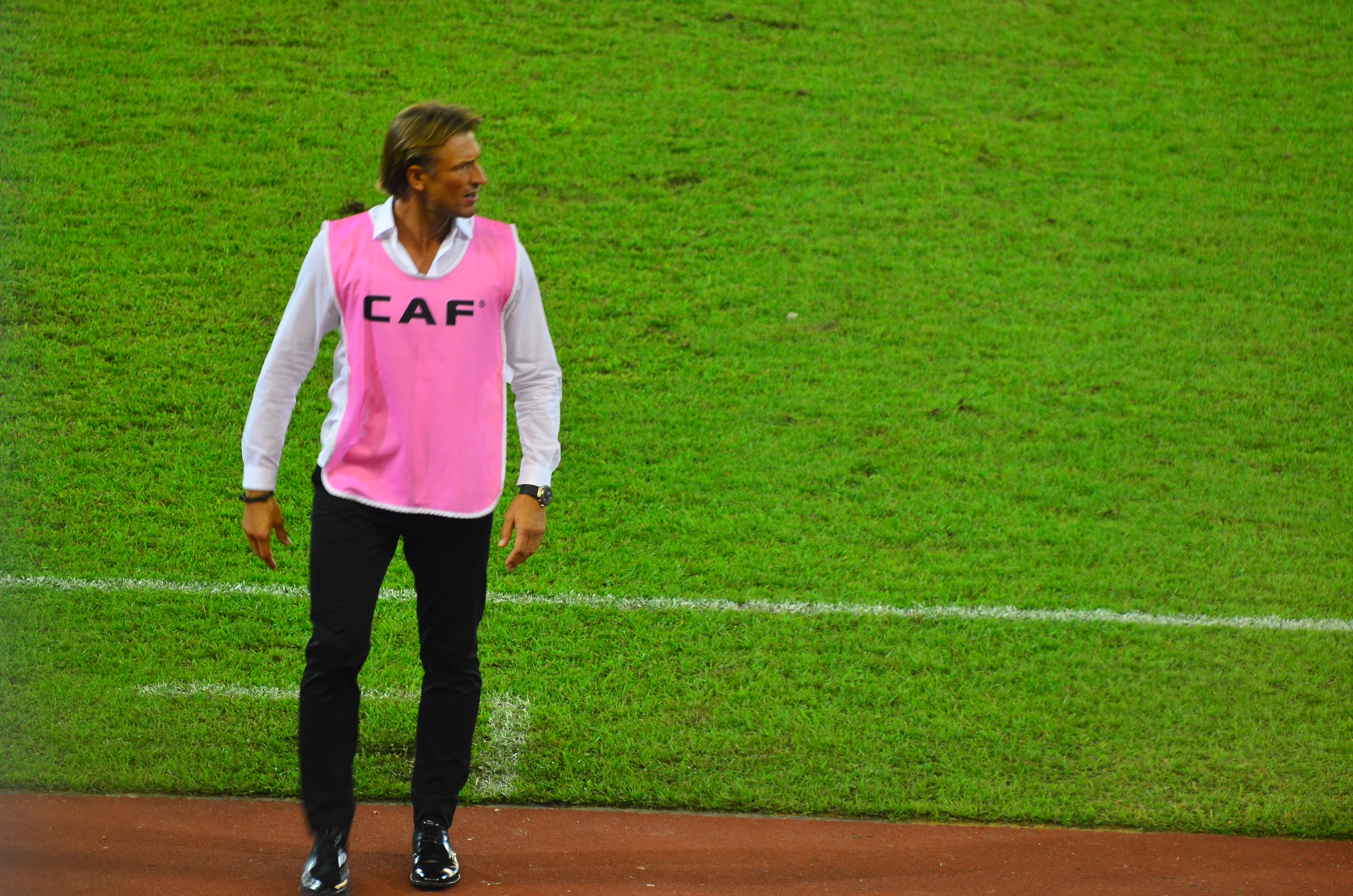
Renard as Ivory Coast manager at the 2015 Africa Cup of Nations.

Renard was appointed as manager of the Ivory Coast national team in July 2014. He was manager at the 2015 Africa Cup of Nations, and praised the organization of the tournament. He won the competition, becoming the first coach to win two Africa Cup of Nations with different countries.

=== Lille ===
Renard became manager of French club Lille in May 2015. On 11 November 2015, he was sacked after getting only 13 points in 13 league games.

=== Morocco ===
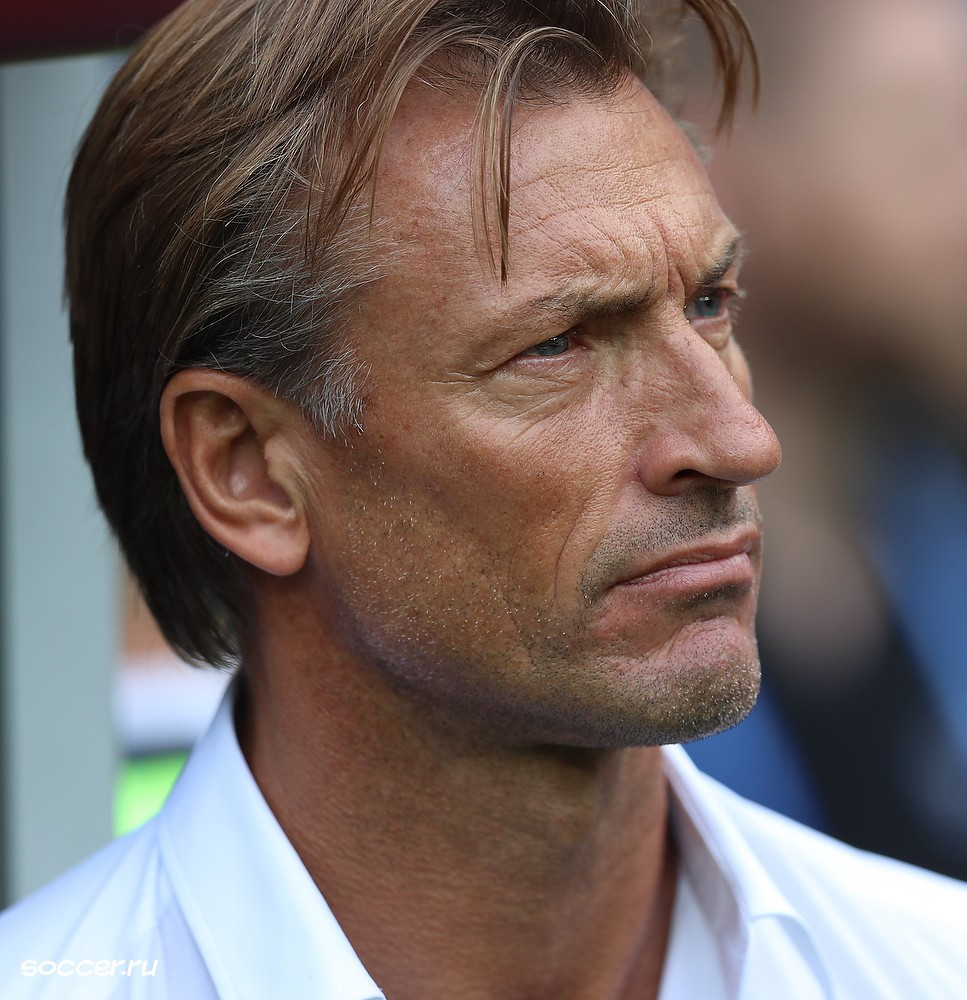
Renard as Morocco manager at the 2018 FIFA World Cup.

In February 2016, Renard was linked with the vacant Morocco national team job. Later that month he was appointed as the new Morocco manager. In October 2016, he was linked with the vacant Algeria national team job.

In November 2017, he qualified Morocco to the 2018 FIFA World Cup in Russia, their first since 1998. Later that month, he signed a new contract, until 2022. In July 2019 the Moroccan team was eliminated from the 2019 Africa Cup of Nations, with Renard taking responsibility for the "shock exit". He resigned a few days later, on 15 July 2019.

=== Saudi Arabia ===
Later in July 2019 he became manager of Saudi Arabia, the first Frenchman to do so. On 10 September 2019, he managed his first official match against Yemen in the 2022 FIFA World Cup qualification. In March 2022, Renard led Saudi Arabia to qualification for the 2022 FIFA World Cup, and in the process became the foreign-born manager with the most wins (18) in the nation's history. In their opening game of the World Cup, he led Saudi Arabia to a 2–1 win over Argentina, one of the pre-tournament favourites, in what was considered one of the biggest shock results in World Cup history. However, Saudi Arabia lost the other two matches against Poland and Mexico, and were eventually eliminated from the group stage. His final game was a friendly, which he lost 1-2 to Bolivia. He was replaced by Roberto Mancini.

=== France women ===
In March 2023, Renard was linked with the job as coach of the France women's national football team following the dismissal of Corinne Diacre. On 29 March, the Saudi Arabian Football Federation accepted Renard's resignation, in order to begin his tenure as coach of the France women's team. On 30 March, Renard officially became the manager of France's women's national team, succeeding Diacre with a contract lasted until August 2024. He was tasked with preparing the team for the 2023 FIFA Women's World Cup amid player changes and conflicts, particularly with management.

Renard became the second manager to have coached at both the men's and women's World Cups after Englishman John Herdman.

On 29 July 2023, he became the first coach to win a match in both the men's and women's World Cups after France defeated Brazil in the group stage. However, France were eliminated on penalties in the quarter-finals, losing to Australia.

In January 2024, the Ivory Coast men's team attempted to temporarily hire Renard for the delayed 2024 AFCON tournament, which was rejected by the French Football Federation.

It was announced that Renard would leave his role after the 2024 Summer Olympics, being succeeded by assistant Laurent Bonadei.

=== Return to Saudi Arabia ===
On 26 October 2024, Renard was reappointed as head coach of Saudi Arabia, after the sacking of Roberto Mancini during the 2026 FIFA World Cup qualification. A year later, on 14 October, he guided the national team to secure qualification for the 2026 FIFA World Cup, finishing at the top of their group in the qualification fourth round after a goalless draw with Iraq. He was sacked on 17 April 2026, before the tournament began.

=== Tunisia ===
On 16 June 2026, Renard was appointed head coach of the Tunisia national football team following the dismissal of Sabri Lamouchi, whose tenure ended after a 5–1 defeat to Sweden in Tunisia's opening Group F match at the 2026 FIFA World Cup in Monterrey, Mexico. His first game in charge on 20 June, which was also the 1,000th in the World Cup, was a 4–0 defeat against Japan, and resulted in Tunisia's elimination from the tournament. Two days later, on 22 June, he confirmed his intention to step down once the final group-stage match against the Netherlands in the United States has concluded. On 4 July 2026, Renard announced his resignation as head coach after a brief 18-day tenure.

=== Return to Ivory Coast ===
In August 2026, Renard returned as manager of Ivory Coast.

== Managerial statistics ==
As of match played 17 November 2026

Managerial record by team and tenure
Team	From	To	Record				
Team	From	To	G	W	D	L	Win %
Cambridge United	1 January 2004	12 May 2004	6	2	2	2	33.33
Cherbourg	1 July 2005	30 June 2007	77	19	31	27	24.68
Zambia	7 May 2008	6 April 2010	18	5	4	9	27.78
Angola	8 April 2010	6 October 2010	3	0	0	3	0.00
USM Alger	18 January 2011	23 October 2011	22	9	7	6	40.91
Zambia	24 October 2011	6 October 2013	24	11	9	4	45.83
Sochaux	7 October 2013	24 May 2014	33	11	8	14	33.33
Ivory Coast	29 June 2014	25 May 2015	18	9	5	4	50.00
Lille OSC	26 May 2015	11 November 2015	14	3	7	4	21.43
Morocco	16 February 2016	21 July 2019	45	25	9	11	55.56
Saudi Arabia	29 July 2019	28 March 2023	45	20	10	15	44.44
France women's	30 March 2023	6 August 2024	17	12	3	2	70.59
Saudi Arabia	26 October 2024	17 April 2026	29	13	5	11	44.83
Tunisia	16 June 2026	4 July 2026	2	0	0	2	0.00
Ivory Coast	4 August 2026	present	5	3	1	1	60.00
Total			358	142	101	115	39.66

== Personal life ==
Renard is in a relationship with Viviane Dièye, the widow of coach Bruno Metsu.

== Honours ==
=== Manager ===
Zambia

- Africa Cup of Nations: 2012
- COSAFA Cup: 2013

Ivory Coast

- Africa Cup of Nations: 2015

Saudi Arabia

- FIFA Arab Cup third place: 2025

Individual

- CAF Coach of the Year: 2012, 2015, 2018
- Officier of the National Order of the Ivory Coast: 2015

== See also ==
- National team managers with 100 or more matches
