= Fabienne Prieux =

French footballer (born 1971)

Personal information
- Date of birth: 15 September 1971 (age 55)
- Place of birth: La Ferté-Macé, France
- Position: Defender

Senior career*
Years	Team	Apps	(Gls)
1999–2001	FCF Juvisy		

International career
1992–1999	France	23	(1)
- * Club domestic league appearances and goals

Fabienne Prieux is a retired French professional footballer who played as a defender for French club FCF Juvisy and the France national team.

== International career ==
Prieux was represented France 23 times and scored 1 goal.
