= Anaële Le Moguédec =

French footballer (born 2001)

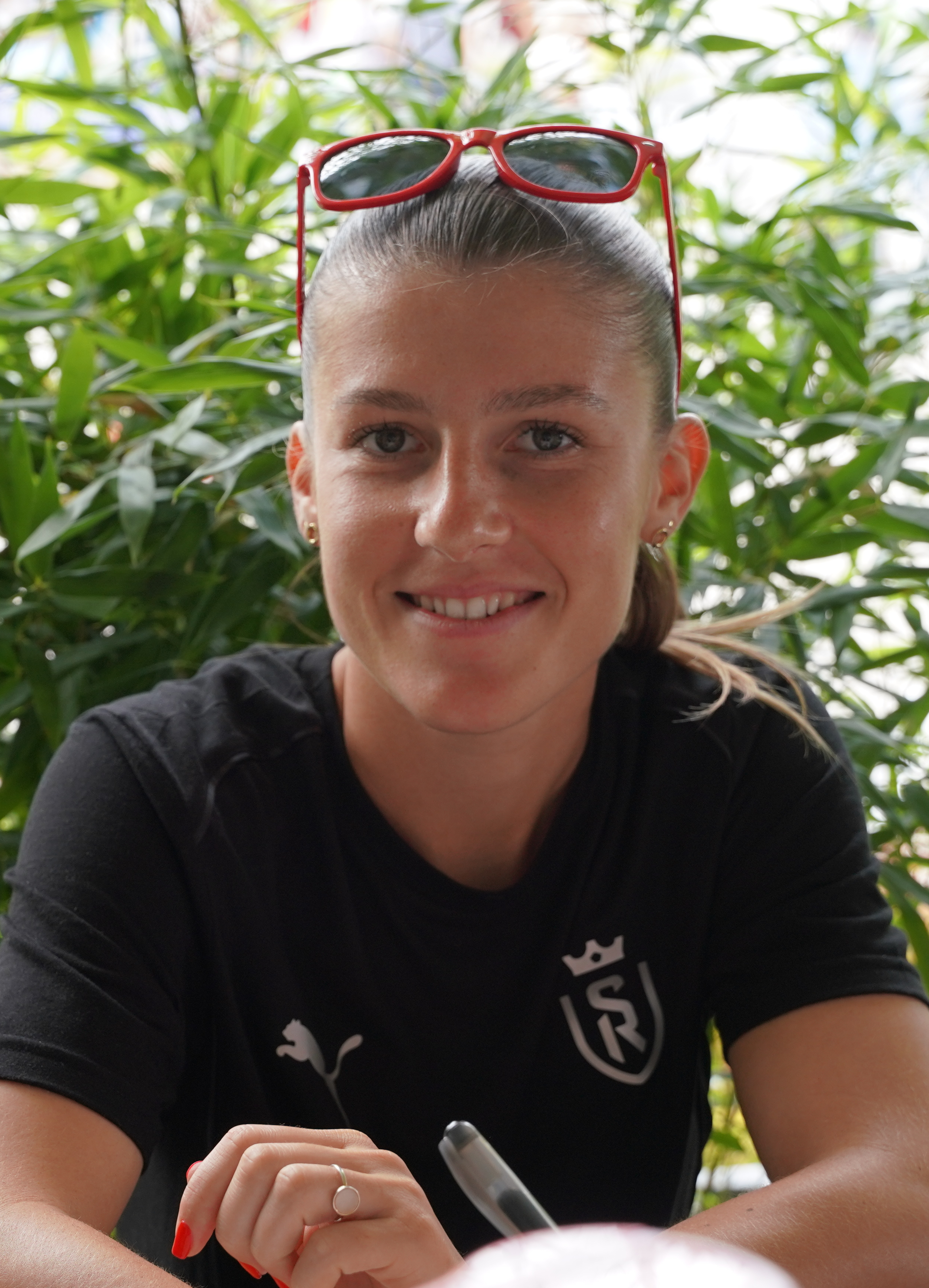
- Le Moguédec in 2024

Personal information
- Date of birth: 12 June 2001 (age 25)
- Place of birth: Vannes, France
- Height: 1.64 m (5 ft 5 in)
- Position: Midfielder

Team information
- Current team: Paris FC
- Number: 24

Youth career
- 2007–2016: St-Jean-Brévelay
- 2016–2018: Guingamp

Senior career*
Years	Team	Apps	(Gls)
2018–2019	Guingamp	0	(0)
2019–2023	Nantes	58	(5)
2023–2025	Reims	44	(5)
2025–	Paris FC	28	(4)

International career^{‡}
2023–2024	France U23	8	(0)
2025–	France	6	(2)
Medal record
Women's football
Representing France
UEFA Women's Nations League
Third place	2025
- * Club domestic league appearances and goals as of 22 November 2026 ‡ National team caps and goals as of 10 October 2026

Anaële Le Moguédec (born 6 December 2001) is a French professional footballer who plays as a midfielder for Première Ligue club Paris FC and the France national team. She has previously played for Nantes and Reims.

== Club career ==
=== Nantes ===
Born in Vannes, Le Moguédec started playing football at the age of 5 for FC St-Jean-Brévelay. She then spent three years at En Avant Guingamp before signing for Division 2 Féminine club FC Nantes in 2019. Over four seasons at Nantes, Le Moguédec showed steady signs of improvement, plying her trade both as a defensive or attacking midfielder. She has referred to her time at Nantes as her "best years."

Near the end of her Nantes tenure, Le Moguédec balanced her playing career with the academic load of being a student at the ISG Business School. She vowed to fully dedicate herself to football if Nantes gained promotion to the French top-flight, but the opposite instead occurred; at the end of the 2022–23 season, Nantes was relegated down to the Division 3 Féminine. Although the later exclusion of ASJ Soyaux-Charente from the Division 2 allowed for Nantes to evade relegation, Le Moguédec had already departed from Nantes. She recorded 68 matches across her four years at the club.

=== Reims ===
In a quest to gain experience in the Division 1 Féminine, Le Moguédec signed for Stade de Reims on 9 June 2023. She adapted quickly to top-division football and ended up playing in every one of Reims' regular season matches across two consecutive seasons. At the end of the 2024–25 season, Reims was relegated and Le Moguédec changed clubs once again.

=== Paris FC ===
On 28 May 2025, Le Moguédec signed a 3-year contract with Première Ligue team Paris FC. She scored her first goal for the club on 26 September, contributing to a 2–0 victory over AS Saint-Étienne. Less than a month later, she scored a brace in a 6–1 drubbing of newly promoted side Olympique de Marseille. Le Moguédec quickly became a regular starter for the Parisian club, starring in both league play and in the UEFA Women's Champions League. On 19 November 2025, she assisted both Maeline Mendy and Maëlle Garbino in a 2–0 league phase victory over Portuguese champions Benfica.

== International career ==
Le Moguédec has represented France at the under-23 national level. She received her first call-up to the French senior team in November 2025 for two UEFA Women's Nations League games against Sweden. On 28 November, she made her national team debut, coming on as a late substitute for Grace Geyoro in a 2–1 first-leg victory for the French.

== Career statistics ==
=== Club ===
As of 30 September 2026

Appearances and goals by club, season and competition
Club	Season	League			National cup (Note: Includes the Coupe de France Féminine)		League cup (Note: Includes the Coupe LFFP)		Continental (Note: Includes the UEFA Women's Champions League)		Other		Total	
Club	Season	Division	Apps	Goals	Apps	Goals	Apps	Goals	Apps	Goals	Apps	Goals	Apps	Goals
En Avant Guingamp	2017–18	Division 2 Féminine	0	0	1	0	—		—		—		1	0
En Avant Guingamp	2018–19	Division 2 Féminine	0	0	0	0	—		—		—		0	0
En Avant Guingamp	Total		0	0	1	0	0	0	0	0	0	0	1	0
FC Nantes	2019–20	Division 2 Féminine	15	1	1	0	—		—		—		16	1
FC Nantes	2020–21	Division 2 Féminine	6	0	—		—		—		—		6	0
FC Nantes	2021–22	Division 2 Féminine	21	4	5	1	—		—		—		26	5
FC Nantes	2022–23	Division 2 Féminine	16	0	3	0	—		—		—		19	0
FC Nantes	Total		58	5	9	1	0	0	0	0	0	0	67	6
Stade de Reims	2023–24	Division 1 Féminine	22	3	1	1	—		—		—		23	4
Stade de Reims	2024–25	Première Ligue	22	2	2	0	—		—		—		24	2
Stade de Reims	Total		44	5	3	1	0	0	0	0	0	0	47	6
Paris FC	2025–26	Première Ligue	20	3	4	1	2	0	9	0	2 (Note: Appearance(s) in the Première Ligue Playoffs)	0	35	4
Paris FC	2026–27	Première Ligue	3	0	0	0	—		2	0	—		5	0
Paris FC	Total		23	3	4	1	2	0	11	0	2	0	40	4
Career total			125	13	17	3	2	0	11	0	2	0	155	16

=== International ===
As of match played 10 October 2026

Appearances and goals by national team and year
National team	Year	Apps	Goals
France	2025	1	0
France	2026	5	2
Total		6	2

Scores and results list France's goal tally first, score column indicates score after each Le Moguédec goal.

List of international goals scored by Anaële Le Moguédec
No.	Date	Venue	Opponent	Score	Result	Competition
1	10 October 2026	Stade Francis Le Basser, Laval, France	Latvia	2–0	9–0	Friendly
2	10 October 2026	Stade Francis Le Basser, Laval, France	Latvia	5–0	9–0	Friendly
