= Michèle Wolf (footballer) =

French association football player (born 1954)

Personal information
- Date of birth: 29 August 1954 (age 72)
- Place of birth: Strasbourg, France
- Position: Midfielder

Senior career*
Years	Team	Apps	(Gls)
1974-1977	Reims		

International career
1972-1986	France	36	(9)
- * Club domestic league appearances and goals

Michèle Wolf is a French former football player who played as a forward for French club Reims of the Division 1 Féminine.

== Honours ==
- Division 1 Féminine
  - Winners (3): 1974–75, 1975–76, 1976–77
