= Gaëlle Blouin =

French footballer (born 1972)

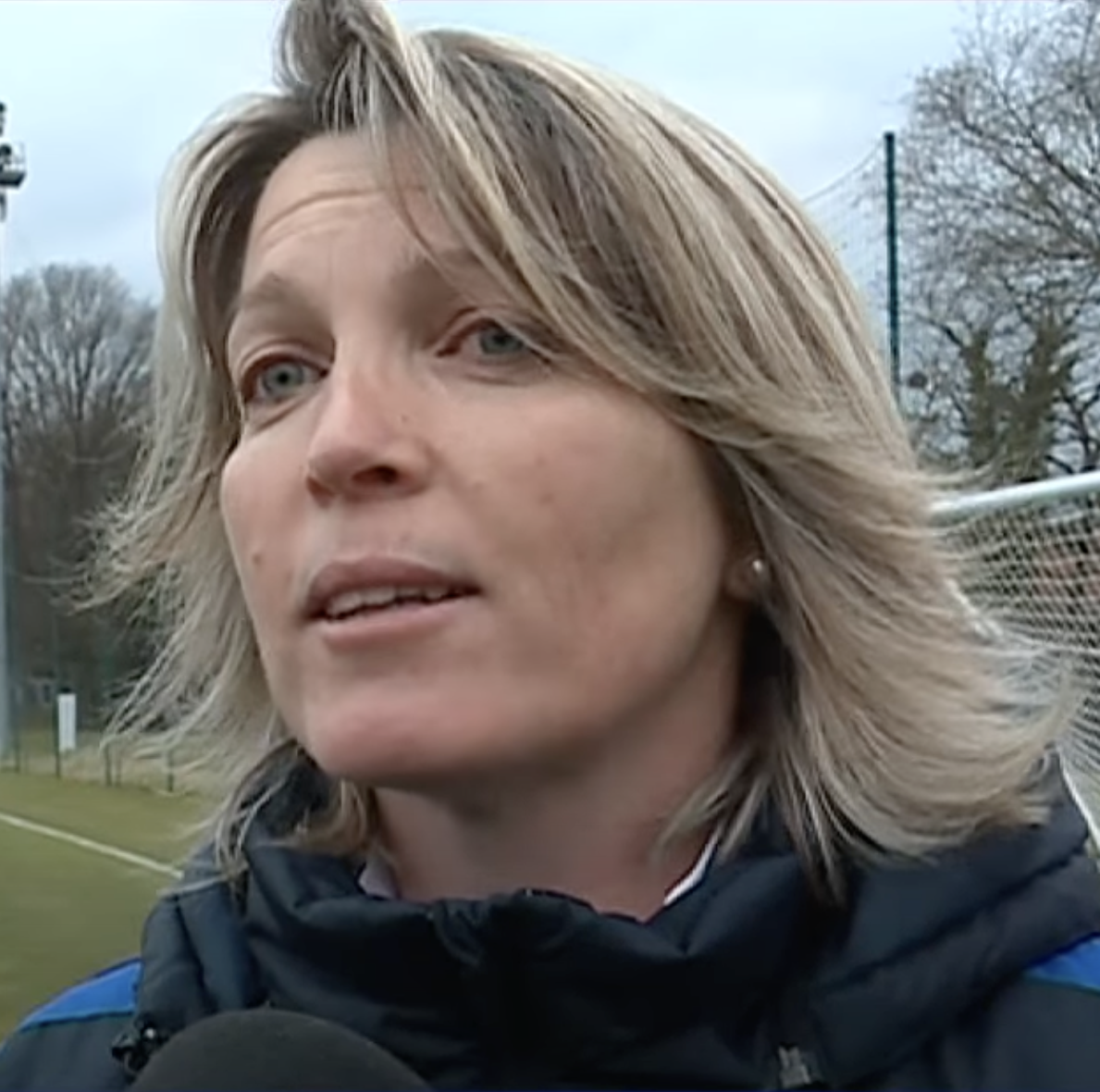

Personal information
- Date of birth: 14 August 1972 (age 54)
- Place of birth: Nantes, France
- Position: Midfielder

Senior career*
Years	Team	Apps	(Gls)
- Toulouse FC

International career
- France
- * Club domestic league appearances and goals

Gaëlle Blouin (born 14 August 1972) is a French footballer who played as a midfielder for the France women's national football team. She was part of the team at the UEFA Women's Euro 2001. On club level she plays for Toulouse FC in France.
