= Élisabeth Loisel =

French footballer and manager (born 1963)

Personal information
- Date of birth: 1 August 1963 (age 63)
- Place of birth: Meaux, France
- Height: 1.71 m (5 ft 7 in)
- Position: Defender

Senior career*
Years	Team	Apps	(Gls)
1979–1982	Stade Reims		
1982–1989	Saint-Maur		

International career
1980–1989	France	40	(3)

Managerial career
- 1997–2007: France (women's)
- 2007–2008: China (women's)
- * Club domestic league appearances and goals

Élisabeth Loisel (born 1 August 1963) is a French former football player and manager. Throughout her career she played for Stade de Reims and VGA Saint-Maur. She was a member of the France national team between 1980 and her retirement in 1989 at 26.

In 1997 she was appointed the France national team manager. Under her tenancy France qualified for the 2003 World Cup and the 2001 and 2005 European Championships. She was sacked after France failed to qualify for the 2007 World Cup. That same year she was signed by the Chinese Football Association as China's manager for the 2008 Summer Olympics. However, she was sacked five months from the tournament, following a disappointing performance in the 2008 Algarve Cup.

She currently leads the Committee for Women's Football and the FIFA Women's World Cup in the French Football Federation.
