= Laurent Bonadei =

French football coach (born 1969)

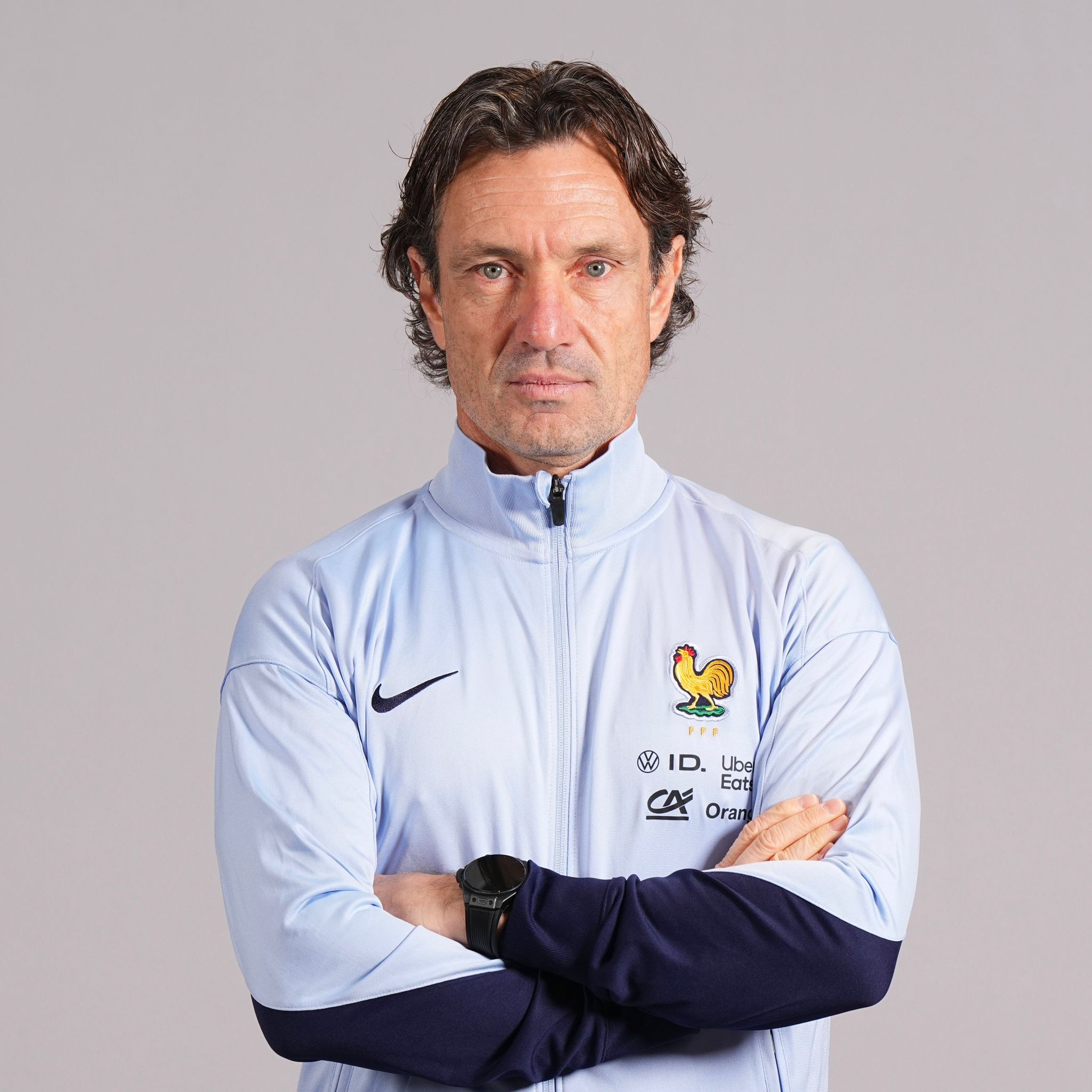
- Bonadei in 2024

Personal information
- Full name: Laurent Pierre Bonadei
- Date of birth: 3 November 1969 (age 56)
- Place of birth: Marseille, France

Team information
- Current team: France women (head coach)

Managerial career
- Years: Team
- 2013–2015: Paris Saint-Germain U19
- 2015–2019: Nice II
- 2021: Saudi Arabia (caretaker)
- 2024–: France women

Laurent Pierre Bonadei (born 3 November 1969) is a French football coach and former player who is currently the head coach of the France women's national team.

Previously, Bonadei was the assistant coach of the Saudi Arabia national team under Hervé Renard, having also coached the team during the 2021 FIFA Arab Cup. He then performed the same role under Renard at France women's national team.

Bonadei was the coach of youth club teams such as Paris Saint-Germain U19, and Nice II.

Bonadei lead the France women's national football team in July 2025 to their first major international title at the UEFA Women's EURO 2025. His team was then eliminated in the quarterfinals by Germany women's national football team with a score of 1–1 after extra time and penalties.
