= Anne Zenoni =

French footballer (born 1971)

Personal information
- Date of birth: 26 March 1971 (age 55)
- Place of birth: Albi, France
- Position: Forward

Senior career*
Years	Team	Apps	(Gls)
1985–1991	Albi		
1991–2002	Toulouse FC		
2006–2007	Albi		

International career
1992–2001	France	50	(6)
- * Club domestic league appearances and goals

Anne Zenoni (born 26 March 1971) is a French footballer who played as a forward for the France women's national football team. She was part of the team at the UEFA Women's Euro 1997 and UEFA Women's Euro 2001. On club level she played for Toulouse FC in France. She became the UNFP Female Player of the Year in 2001.
