= Isabelle Le Boulch =

French footballer (born 1964)

Personal information
- Date of birth: 29 December 1964 (age 61)
- Place of birth: Pluméliau, France
- Position: Forward

Senior career*
Years	Team	Apps	(Gls)
1984-1999	Saint-Brieuc SC		
1999-2002	Saint-Brieuc FF		

International career
1985-1992	France	27	(8)
- * Club domestic league appearances and goals

Isabelle Le Boulch (born 29 December 1964) is a French footballer who plays as a striker for French club Saint-Brieuc SC of the Division 1 Féminine.

== International career ==
Le Boulch represented France 27 times between 1985 and 1992.
