= Emmanuelle Sykora =

French footballer (born 1976)

Personal information
- Date of birth: 21 February 1976 (age 50)
- Place of birth: Pau, France
- Height: 1.72 m (5 ft 8 in)
- Position: Defender

Senior career*
Years	Team	Apps	(Gls)
1991–1992	F.C. Pau		
1992–2004	F.C.F. Lyon		
2004–2005	Olympique Lyonnais		

International career^{‡}
1992–2004	France	36	(9)
- * Club domestic league appearances and goals ‡ National team caps and goals as of 29 September 2003

Emmanuelle Sykora (born 21 February 1976) is a French women's international footballer who plays as a defender. She is a member of the France women's national football team. She was part of the team at the UEFA Women's Euro 1997, UEFA Women's Euro 2001 and 2003 FIFA Women's World Cup.
