= Sandrine Fusier =

French footballer (born 1972)

Personal information
- Date of birth: 6 July 1972 (age 54)
- Position: Forward

Senior career*
Years	Team	Apps	(Gls)
1992–2005	FCF Juvisy		

International career
1992–1996	France	21	(7)
- * Club domestic league appearances and goals

Sandrine Fusier is a retired French professional footballer who played as a forward for French club FCF Juvisy and the France national team.

== International career ==
Fusier represented France 21 times and scored 7 goals.
