= Hélène Hillion-Guillemin =

French footballer (born 1969)

Personal information
- Date of birth: 2 January 1969 (age 57)
- Place of birth: Pontivy, France
- Height: 1.69 m (5 ft 7 in)
- Position: Defender

Senior career*
Years	Team	Apps	(Gls)
1987–1990	VGA Saint-Maur		
1990–1997	Juvisy		

International career
1988–1997	France	62	(1)
- * Club domestic league appearances and goals

Hélène Hillion-Guillemin (born 2 January 1969) is a French former footballer who played as a defender for Juvisy of the Division 1 Féminine. Guillemin won 6 Division 1 Féminine titles.

== International career ==
Hélène Hillion represented France 62 times and scored once. Guillemin was also part of the French team at the 1997 European Championships.

== Honours ==
=== Official ===
- Division 1 Féminine (Champions of France) (level 1)

Winners (4): 1987–88, 1989–90, 1991–92, 1993–94
