= Corinne Diacre =

French footballer and manager (born 1974)

Personal information
- Full name: Corinne Catherine Diacre
- Date of birth: 4 August 1974 (age 52)
- Place of birth: Croix, France
- Height: 1.76 m (5 ft 9 in)
- Position: Defender

Youth career
- 1982–1983: CO Saint-Chamond
- 1983–1986: SS Aubusson
- 1986–1988: ES Azérables

Senior career*
Years	Team	Apps	(Gls)
1988–2007	Soyaux		

International career
1993–2005	France	121	(14)

Managerial career
- 2007–2013: Soyaux
- 2014–2017: Clermont
- 2017–2023: France Women
- 2025–2026: Les Marseillaises
- * Club domestic league appearances and goals

Corinne Catherine Diacre (born 4 August 1974) is a French professional football manager and former player. A defender, she played her entire club career with Soyaux and captained the France national team.

In August 2014, she became the first woman to coach a men's professional football team (Clermont) in a competitive match in France. Diacre continued to manage Clermont for three seasons until taking up the position as head coach of the French women's national team, a job she lost in March 2023. Diacre’s tenure with France was notably marred with controversies.

== Playing career ==
=== Club ===
Diacre joined amateur club ASJ Soyaux in 1988, and quickly stood out for her strong character. She remained with Soyaux throughout her entire career. Prior to her final 2006-07 season, she received many proposals from American clubs, but stayed in France. In October 2006, she was injured during a match between Soyaux and Montpellier, suffering from an ACL tear in her right knee. This injury ended her footballing career at the age of 32.

During her career 19-year-long career, she played around 350 D1 matches, which was a record at the time. She has since been overtaken by Sandrine Soubeyrand, Gaëtane Thiney and Camille Abily.

=== International ===
Diacre began her France national team career at the age of 18, debuting for the team on March 9, 1993. She was given captaincy a few years after her debut. Diacre then went on to represent France in the 1997, 2001 and 2005 European Championships, serving as the team's captain.

Diacre scored the goal against England that qualified France for the 2003 World Cup, where they were eliminated in the first round. In August 2005, Diacre retired from the France national team at the age of 31, finishing her career with 121 national team caps.

== International goals ==
No.	Date	Venue	Opponent	Score	Result	Competition
1.	28 September 1996	Avranches, France	Finland	2–0	3–0	UEFA Women's Euro 1997 qualifying
2.	18 May 1997	Orry-la-Ville, France	Republic of Ireland	2–0	2–0	Friendly
3.	21 March 1998	Guéret, France	Poland	1–0	3–0	Friendly
4.	14 May 1998	Cesson-Sévigné, France	Algeria	1–0	14–0	Friendly
5.	14 May 1998	Cesson-Sévigné, France	Algeria	2–0	14–0	Friendly
6.	14 May 1998	Cesson-Sévigné, France	Algeria	3–0	14–0	Friendly
7.	20 March 1999	Bonneuil-sur-Marne, France	Austria	4–1	4–1	Friendly
8.	30 October 1999	Eindhoven, Netherlands	Netherlands	1–0	1–1	UEFA Women's Euro 2001 qualifying
9.	27 November 1999	Martigues, France	Spain	1–0	1–0	UEFA Women's Euro 2001 qualifying
10.	15 April 2000	Castanet-Tolosan, France	Netherlands	1–1	2–1	UEFA Women's Euro 2001 qualifying
11.	16 November 2002	Saint-Étienne, France	England	1–0	1–0	2003 FIFA Women's World Cup qualification
12.	15 November 2003	Quimper, France	Poland	3–0	7–1	UEFA Women's Euro 2005 qualifying
13.	19 February 2005	La Manga, Spain	Norway	2–0	2–0	Friendly
14.	11 March 2005	Albufeira, Portugal	Denmark	2–1	2–1	2005 Algarve Cup

== Coaching career ==
Diacre previously served as ASJ Soyaux's manager and the France national team's assistant manager.

In June 2014, French men's professional club, Clermont Foot, appointed her as the replacement for head coach Helena Costa. On 4 August, her 40th birthday, she became the first woman to manage in the top two tiers of a men's European League, in a 2–1 Ligue 2 loss at Brest.

After three full seasons all in Ligue 2, on 30 August 2017 Diacre left Clermont to become the manager of France's women's national team. She succeeded Olivier Echouafni and became the first woman in the role since January 2007. At the 2019 FIFA Women's World Cup, hosted by France, Diacre had the goal by the French Football Federation of reaching the final, despite the draw meaning that they would likely face favourites the United States in the quarter-finals. Despite a 2–1 loss at that stage to that team, Diacre said that she would remain in the job for the duration of her long-term contract.

On 9 March 2023, the France Football Federation terminated Diacre amid reports of several top players, including captain Wendie Renard, refusing to play under her management.

== Controversies ==
In 2017, Diacre stripped longtime France national team player Wendie Renard of her first-captaincy, and gave the armband to Amandine Henry instead. Renard discussed her feud with Diacre in her 2019 autobiography “Mon Étoile”. Renard wrote that Diacre stripped her of her captaincy under the reasoning that Renard had a low individual level and did not play as well for France as she did for her club team, Lyon. In the same autobiography, Renard also claimed that Diacre refused to shake her hand at a national team camp in Montpellier in 2018, and “looked at (Renard) with disgust” for not introducing herself with the faire la bise instead. Renard’s autobiography drew criticism from Noël Le Graët for revisiting old problems, and Diacre demanded Renard be punished, which Le Graët also pushed back against.

Diacre generated controversy with her list of call-ups for the 2019 FIFA Women's World Cup, with notable absences including Kheira Hamraoui and Marie-Antoinette Katoto. The absence of the latter Katoto garnered the most controversy, as she was the French league’s top scorer in the previous season. France exited the tournament in the quarterfinals to the United States, the eventual winners of the tournament. Later in the year, United States player and quarterfinal goalscorer Megan Rapinoe questioned Diacre’s tactics in the match, and suggested the team have a change in management.

On the morning of the 2019 FIFA Women's World Cup Final, Diacre gave an interview with Téléfoot where she criticized Eugénie Le Sommer’s play during the quarterfinal match against the USA, alleging that Le Sommer ignored Diacre’s tactics and strayed too far to the left. Diacre’s comments were put into question by Olympique Lyonnais president Jean-Michel Aulas and former Lyon manager Reynald Pedros. Aulas claimed that people from Lyon knew of “inconceivable things” that happened during preparation for the 2019 Women’s World Cup. Pedros replied to Diacre’s criticisms with a tweet praising Le Sommer’s play in the striker position with Lyon. Diacre later apologized to Le Sommer for her comments, saying she was “still learning the rules of communication.”

In February 2020, France national team midfielder Gaëtane Thiney was the next to speak out against Diacre, asking her to modernize her coaching tactics and model them after French men’s national football team coach Didier Deschamps. Weeks later, she was subsequently left out of the French squad for the 2020 Tournoi de France, with Diacre claiming her performances were below par. Following the Tournoi de France, former Lyon manager Gérard Prêcheur told L'Équipe that “everyone knows” about the bad relationship between Diacre and her players.

At the end of July 2020, longtime France national team goalkeeper Sarah Bouhaddi indefinitely retired from international football, at first referencing the team’s early 2019 Women’s World Cup exit as a reason for her departure. Bouhaddi was originally unsettled by Diacre’s decision to give France's third-captaincy to Marion Torrent who had less than 30 caps, after Bouhaddi had been third-captain for over a year. Bouhaddi delved further into her reasons for retiring from the national team and denounced Diacre in an interview, saying “Winning a title with this coach seems impossible to me. We play in a very, very negative environment. I don't see myself winning anything with this manager, and a lot of players think so too but don't say it.” Bouhaddi was included in Diacre’s call-up list in September 2020, but Bouhaddi persisted on being away from the team as long as Diacre was national team manager.

A new controversy arose when Diacre did not call up captain Amandine Henry for two Euro 2022 qualifying matches in October 2020, saying she was not at an adequate national team level after recovering from an injury. The decision drew critical reactions from Olympique Lyonnais Féminin’s General Manager Olivier Blanc, Henry’s agent, Wendie Renard, Amel Majri, and Reynald Pedros. Pedros commented on the situation to Canal+, saying Diacre’s treatment of Henry was “very clearly a punishment.” He continued to criticize Diacre, saying "It is a very complicated relationship between the players and the coach. Players returned to their clubs very psychologically affected. They go to the France team out of obligation, not out of pleasure. They go to the French team with a pit in their stomach. When they came back, we had discussions to morally try to put them afloat […] We could see that there were things that were wrong. The girls were sometimes at their wit's end. ” Diacre responded accusing Pedros of being jealous of her position as national team coach. A short time after the call-up list was announced, Henry scored a goal against Guingamp with her club team, Lyon. She celebrated by plugging her ears (similarly to Memphis Depay’s signature celebration) as teammate Dzsenifer Marozsán pulled on the name of Henry’s shirt, alluding to Diacre’s comments.

"When you go in her direction, you have her confidence. But as soon as you start to put yourself between her and her goals, she won't hesitate to fire you for the good of her group."

— Anthony Lippini explaining his experience under Diacre's management at Clermont.

In the same month of October, former Clermont Foot goalkeeper Franck L'Hostis, along with players Anthony Lippini and Karim Djellabi, spoke out against Diacre’s coaching style in an interview with So Foot, comparing her time at the club to a dictatorship. They claimed Diacre would force players to sit out matches without giving them a reason, and would threaten to fire them “for the good of the group.” Diacre also allegedly would not allow players to stay in their rooms during Ramadan, again for the good of the group. The players continued, criticizing her for being overly particular about minor things such as players wearing matching socks in practice or even barring players from having ice cubes in their drinks. All of these things earned her the nicknames of “Attila,” “the dragon” and “the chief warrant officer” amongst the Clermont players. When Diacre left her position at Clermont, she did so without saying goodbye.

In mid-November, Amandine Henry gave an interview with Canal+, where she spoke about being dropped from the national team, accusing Diacre of doing so as punishment for speaking to Noël Le Graët about the team’s issues. Henry went on to describe the national team environment around the time of the 2019 FIFA Women’s World Cup.

"I saw girls crying in their room, I personally happened to cry in my room, because I wanted to experience this World Cup, but it was total chaos."

Days after Henry’s interview, Diacre attempted to put an end to the controversies surrounding the France national team. She re-called Amandine Henry to the team, despite Henry’s public comments against Diacre. Around the same time as Henry’s interview, a former Clermont player, Thomas Guerbert, spoke about her management during her time at the club. Guerbert tweeted that Diacre’s coaching style for the France national team was the same as it was in the Ligue 2 club, and to “not expect her to change.” Guerbert’s claims echoed the concerns of his Clermont teammates from a month prior.

At the beginning of February 2021, Noël Le Graët offered his continued support to Diacre: "Her sporting record is very good." He added, however, that her communication could be a point to improve: "She has hardened, perhaps a little too much ... There is probably better communication to be had.” In the summer of 2021, Eric Blahic, Diacre’s assistant coach since January 2020, stepped down from his role. He was the second assistant coach under Diacre to step down since 2017. Blahic was reprimanded by Diacre for having private, off-the-record conversations with players, and upon his departure he blamed Diacre for wanting too much control.

On 8 March 2023, amid reports of opposition from players and uncertainty over her future, Diacre said she had been "the subject of a smear campaign that is astonishing in its violence and dishonesty" ahead of the World Cup. French media reports said former captain Wendie Renard and other senior players including Marie-Antoinette Katoto and Kadidiatou Diani had made clear they would no longer play for France as long as Diacre remained coach. A day later, the France Football Federation announced Diacre had been sacked due to her poor relations with players. "It appears that the dysfunctions observed seem, in this context, irreversible," the federation said in a statement.

== Personal life ==
In December 2020, Diacre tested positive for COVID-19. Some members of the French women’s national team were reported to nickname her "cocovirus," in relation to her illness.

== Honours ==
Orders

- Knight of the National Order of Merit: 2014

== See also ==
- List of France women's international footballers
- List of footballers with 100 or more caps
- Timeline of women's sports
- List of women's firsts
- Trophées UNFP du football
