= Françoise Jézéquel =

French footballer (born 1970)

Françoise Jezequel
Personal information
- Date of birth: 30 March 1970 (age 56)
- Place of birth: Morlaix, France
- Position: Midfielder

Senior career*
Years	Team	Apps	(Gls)
- Saint-Brieuc

International career
1988–2001	France	55	(13)
- * Club domestic league appearances and goals

Françoise Jezequel (born 30 March 1970) is a French footballer who played as a midfielder for the France women's national football team. She was part of the team at the UEFA Women's Euro 2001. On club level she played for Saint-Brieuc in France.
