= Stéphanie Mugneret-Béghé =

French footballer (born 1974)

Personal information
- Date of birth: 22 March 1974 (age 52)
- Place of birth: Dijon, France
- Height: 1.62 m (5 ft 4 in)
- Position: Midfielder

Senior career*
Years	Team	Apps	(Gls)
1991–1992	Villers		
1992–1994	Lyon		
1994–2003	Juvisy		
2003–2004	Boston Breakers		
2004–2005	Juvisy	20	(4)

International career
1992–2005	France	115	(14)
- * Club domestic league appearances and goals

Stéphanie Mugneret-Béghé (born 22 March 1974) is a French former football midfielder who played for FCF Lyon and FCF Juvisy in the French First Division and the Boston Breakers in the WUSA. She was a member of the France national team for thirteen years, taking part in the 1997, 2001 and 2005 European Championships and the 2003 World Cup.

== Biography ==
A club, she played the colors of Juvisy FCF from 1994 to 2003 and played in the WUSA with the Boston Breakers in 2003 before finding Juvisy in 2004-2005. With Juvisy she won three French championships in 1996, 1997 and 2003 and won the 2004-2005 Women's Challenge of France.

After her career as a player, she began her career as a coach, taking charge of AS Bon Conseil's women's team.

== Titles ==
- 4 French Leagues (1993, 1996, 1997, 2003)
- 1 French Cup (2005)
