= Candie Herbert =

French footballer (born 1977)

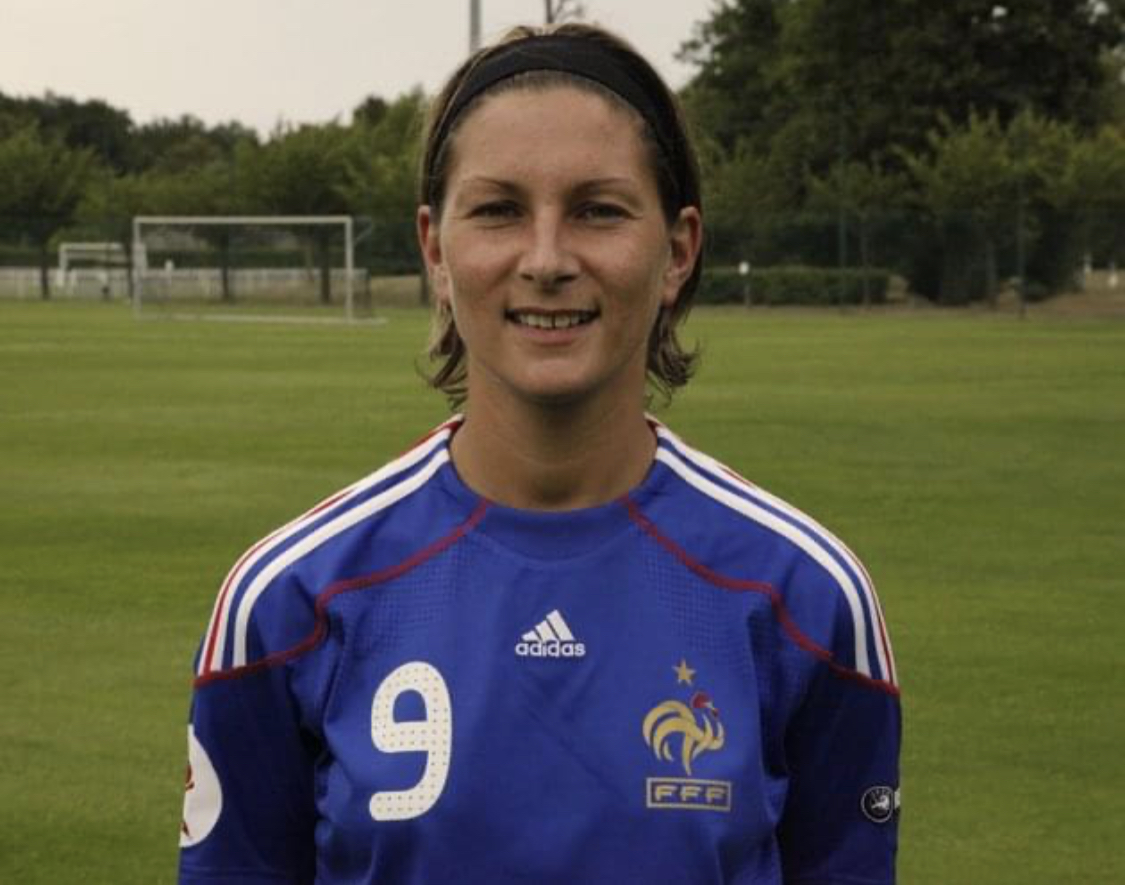
- Candie Herbert

Personal information
- Full name: Candie Monique Nadine Herbert
- Date of birth: 4 June 1977 (age 49)
- Place of birth: Seclin, France
- Height: 5 ft 6 in (1.68 m)
- Position: Striker

Senior career*
| Years | Team | Apps | (Gls) |
| 1992–1996 | Hénin-Beaumont | | |
| 1996–1999 | USO Bray-la-Buissière | | |
| 1999–2007 | Soyaux | 98 | (46) |
| 2007–2009 | Hénin-Beaumont | 39 | (20) |
| 2009–2012 | Soyaux | 40 | (13) |

International career
| 1994–2010 | France | 83 | (11) |
- * Club domestic league appearances and goals

Candie Monique Nadine Herbert (born 4 June 1977) is a French former footballer who played as a striker for ASJ Soyaux and FCF Hénin-Beaumont in the Division 1 Féminine. Herbert was a member of the France women's national football team, making her debut in 1994 and gaining her 83rd and last cap in 2010.

== Career ==
Herbert began her career playing for FCF Hénin-Beaumont, where she established herself as an international making her debut for France at the age of 17. She later joined USO Bray-la-Buissière before finally settling in with ASJ Soyaux at the start of the new millennium. Herbert spent seven productive years at the club making 98 league appearances and scoring 46 goals. In 2007, she returned to Hénin-Beaumont and, in her second season with the club, scored a career high 13 goals. The 2009–10 season saw the emergence of the much younger attacker Pauline Crammer. Due to this and other circumstances, Herbert began the season with the Hénin-Beaumont reserves in the women's third division. She then rejoined Soyaux, playing there until 2012.

== International career ==
Herbert made her international debut on 14 May 1994 in a 1–1 draw with Italy. She has collected 79 caps since her debut scoring 11 goals. On 28 October 2009, Herbert scored her first international brace in a 2011 FIFA Women's World Cup qualification match against Estonia. The match saw France hammer Estonia 12–0. Herbert has participated in several international tournaments for her nation beginning with UEFA Women's Euro 1997, UEFA Women's Euro 2001, UEFA Women's Euro 2005, and ending with UEFA Women's Euro 2009.

== International goals ==
| No. | Date | Venue | Opponent | Score | Result | Competition |
|---|---|---|---|---|---|---|
| 1. | 28 October 2009 | Stade Jules Deschaseaux, Le Havre, France | Estonia | 1–0 | 12–0 | 2011 FIFA Women's World Cup qualification |
| 2. | 28 October 2009 | Stade Jules Deschaseaux, Le Havre, France | Estonia | 8–0 | 12–0 | 2011 FIFA Women's World Cup qualification |
