= France women's national football team =

Women's national association football team representing France

France
- Nickname: Les Bleues (The Blues)
- Association: Fédération Française de Football (FFF)
- Confederation: UEFA (Europe)
- Head coach: Laurent Bonadei
- Captain: Griedge Mbock
- Most caps: Eugénie Le Sommer (200)
- Top scorer: Eugénie Le Sommer (94)
- FIFA code: FRA
| First colours | Second colours |

FIFA ranking
- Current: 6 (20 October 2026)
- Highest: 2 (June 2024)
- Lowest: 11 (December 2024 – March 2025)

First international
- France 4–0 Netherlands (Hazebrouck, France; 17 April 1971)

Biggest win
- France 14–0 Algeria (Cesson-Sévigné, France; 14 May 1998); France 14–0 Bulgaria (Le Mans, France; 28 November 2013)

Biggest defeat
- Germany 7–0 France (Bad Kreuznach, Germany; 2 September 1992)

World Cup
- Appearances: 6 (first in 2003)
- Best result: Fourth place (2011)

Olympic Games
- Appearances: 3 (first in 2012)
- Best result: Fourth place (2012)

European Championship
- Appearances: 8 (first in 1997)
- Best result: Semi-finals (2022)

Nations League Finals
- Appearances: 2 (first in 2024)
- Best result: Runners-up (2024)
Medal record
UEFA Women's Nations League
| Silver medal – second place | 2024 France, Netherlands & Spain | Team |
| Bronze medal – third place | 2025 France, Germany, Spain & Sweden | Team |

The France women's national football team (French: Équipe de France féminine de football, sometimes shortened as Féminin A) represents France in international women's football. The team is directed by the French Football Federation (FFF). France competes as a member of UEFA in various international football tournaments such as the FIFA Women's World Cup, UEFA Women's Euro, the Summer Olympics, and the Algarve Cup.

The France women's national team initially struggled on the international stage failing to qualify for three of the first FIFA Women's World Cups and the six straight UEFA European Championships before reaching the quarter-finals in the 1997 edition of the competition. However, since the beginning of the new millennium, France have become one of the most consistent teams in Europe, having qualified for their first-ever FIFA Women's World Cup in 2003 and reaching the quarter-finals in two of the three European Championships held since 2000. In 2011, France recorded a fourth-place finish at the 2011 FIFA Women's World Cup; its best finish overall at the competition. In the following year, the team captured the 2012 Cyprus Cup and the fourth place at Women's Olympic Football Tournament.

Laurent Bonadei has been the team manager since August 2024. The current captain of the national team is defender Griedge Mbock.

== History ==
=== Early history ===
In 1919, a women's football championship was established in France by the Fédération des Sociétés Féminines Sportives de France (FSFSF). On 29 April 1920, a team led by French women's football pioneer Alice Milliat traveled to England and played its first international match against English team Dick, Kerr's Ladies. The match, held in Preston, attracted more than 25,000 spectators. France won the match 2–0 and ended its tour with two wins, one draw, and one defeat. The following year, a return match in France at the Stade Pershing in Vincennes, a suburb of Paris, took place in front of over 12,000 spectators. The match ended in a 1–1 draw. In May 1921, France returned to England for friendlies. The team won its first match 5–1, then suffered three consecutive defeats. In October 1921, the English team returned to France contesting matches in Paris and Le Havre with both matches ending in stalemates. Despite women's football in England being prohibited by The Football Association in December 1921, France continued to go there on tour for matches. A victory for the French in Plymouth was followed by 0–0 draws in Exeter and Falmouth. By 1932, the female game had been called to an end and the women's league formed in 1919 by the FSFSF was discontinued. The last match by the FSFSF international team was another scoreless draw against Belgium on 3 April 1932.

=== Ban ===
In 1941, the Vichy regime officially banned women’s football, declaring the sport “unsuitable” and “harmful” for women. This decision was supported by the medical discourse of the time, which claimed that playing football was contrary to “female nature.” For nearly three decades, French players were denied an official national team and the sport survived only thanks to a few local initiatives and the dedication of passionate pioneers.

It was not until the late 1960s that women’s football re-emerged and was once again recognized by the French Football Federation. At that time, French players, notably those from Reims, actively mobilized to have women’s football acknowledged. A year before the official green light from the federation, Les Bleues took part in an unofficial European Cup, organized outside FIFA, with three other nations: England (a 2–0 loss in front of 15,000 spectators), Denmark, and Italy (a 1–0 loss on November 1, 1969, in front of 5,000 spectators). Italy was crowned champion.

The Federal Council of the French Football Federation officially reinstated women's football in 1970 and France played its first official international match on 17 April 1971 against the Netherlands in Hazebrouck with Jocelyne Ratignier and Marie-Claire Caron-Harant scoring. That same year, France took part in the unofficial 1971 Women's World Cup, held in Mexico. The ladies continued the pirate games, which just made it into the margins of FIFA's records, until FIFA began overseeing the competition in 1991. Since 1982, UEFA has governed the European games.

=== Reinstatement ===
In 1975, the women's football league was officially reinstated, this time with backing from the French Football Federation, the governing body of football in France. Stade Reims was the best team in the country throughout the 1970s and early 1980s, thus constituted much of the France national team. For the non-official World Cup in 1978 in Taiwan, the team included the entire Reims squad. The team shared the title with Finland, who never actually played the final. Due to receiving minimal support from the French Football Federation, who ultimately looked at women's football as not being highly regarded, France struggled in international competition failing to advance past the first round of qualification in both the 1984 and 1987 UEFA Women's Championship. Francis Coché, who managed the team during these failures, was later replaced by Aimé Mignot. Mignot helped the team finally get past the first round, however, in the quarterfinals, they lost to Italy, which meant they wouldn't appear at the 1989 UEFA Women's Championship. Despite the initial positives, Mignot failed to continue his success with France failing to qualify for both the 1991 and 1995 FIFA Women's World Cup and losing in the first round of qualification in three straight UEFA Women's Championships. After almost a decade in charge, Mignot was replaced by former women's international Élisabeth Loisel.

With Loisel in charge, the FFF, along with then France national football team manager Aimé Jacquet, moved the women's national team to Clairefontaine, which had quickly become a high-level training facility for male football players. As a result of the move, younger women were afforded the same benefits from the facilities offered by Clairefontaine as the men. The success of female training led to the formation of the Centre National de Formation et d'Entraînement de Clairefontaine, which is now referred to as the female section of the Clairefontaine academy. Under the tutelage of Loisel, the first results appeared encouraging. They reached their first-ever Women's World Cup qualifying for the 2003 edition after defeating England over two legs in a play-off game in London and again at the Stade Geoffroy-Guichard. The match in Saint-Étienne attracted more than 23,000 spectators and was broadcast by the popular French broadcasting company Canal Plus. Loisel's squad later qualified for the 2005 European Championship, where they were knocked out in the group stage. She was eventually sacked after failing to qualify for the 2007 FIFA Women's World Cup.

=== Team under Bruno Bini ===
Loisel was replaced by former football player and now coach Bruno Bini. Bini had been in charge of several France female international youth sides before accepting the role and was tasked with the job of qualifying for UEFA Women's Euro 2009. Due to the success of the Clairefontaine project and the surprising emergence of the French women's first division, Division 1 Féminine, Bini inherited a team full of emerging, young, and influential talent, which included the likes of Camille Abily, Sonia Bompastor, Louisa Necib, Élise Bussaglia, Laura Georges, and Corine Franco. Bini was also provided with leadership from captain Sandrine Soubeyrand. Early results under Bini were extremely positive with France finishing first in their Euro qualifying group only conceded two goals. France also performed well in friendly tournaments, such as the Nordic Cup and Cyprus Cup. At UEFA Women's Euro 2009, France were inserted into the group of death, which consisted of themselves, world powerhouse Germany, no. 7 ranked Norway, and an underrated Iceland. France finished the group with 4 points, alongside Norway, with Germany leading the group. As a result of the competition's rules, all three nations qualified for the quarterfinals. In the knockout rounds, France suffered defeat to the Netherlands losing 5–4 on penalties after no goals were scored in regular time and extra time.

==== 2011 Women's World Cup ====
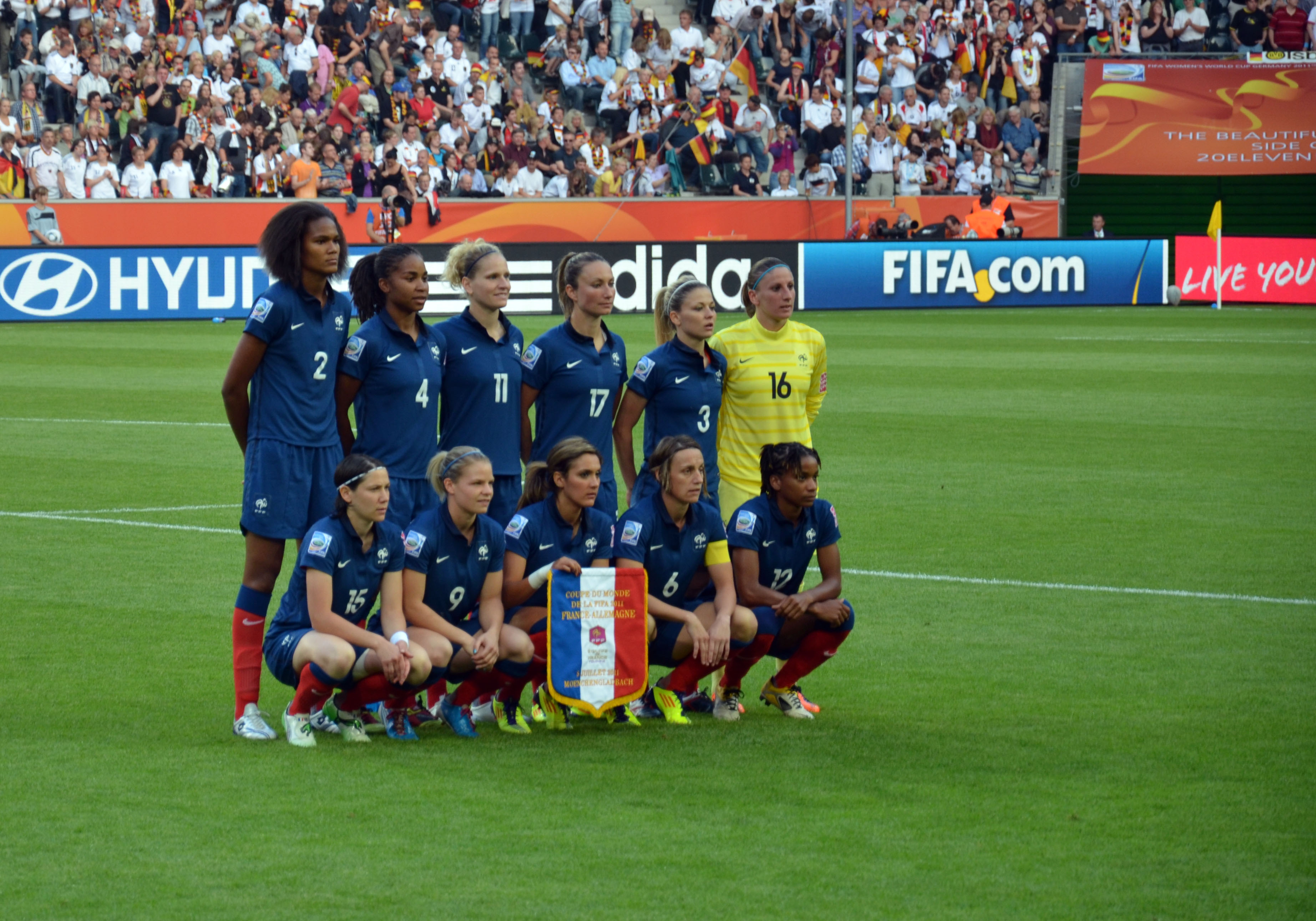
The French team at the 2011 Women's World Cup prior to the 2–4 first round loss to Germany on 5 July 2011.

Bini's next task was to qualify for the 2011 FIFA Women's World Cup after the disappointment of four years earlier. In the team's qualifying group, France finished the campaign scoring 50 goals and conceded none over the course of ten matches (all wins). On 16 September 2010, France qualified for the World Cup following the team's 3–2 aggregate victory over Italy.

At the 2011 FIFA Women's World Cup in Germany, France qualified to the knockout stage by finishing in second place in its group after wins over Nigeria and Canada, and a loss to the host team. The team went on to beat England on penalty kicks in the quarterfinals, but lost to the United States in the semi-finals. France finished the competition in fourth place and earned qualification to the Olympic football tournament at the 2012 Summer Olympics in London; it was the nation's first appearance in the competition. Striker Marie-Laure Delie was the only multiple goal scorer for France in the tournament, while defenders Sonia Bompastor and Laura Georges as well as midfielder Louisa Necib were selected to the All-Star Team.

=== Golden era ===
France has entered one of the most successful eras in the country's women's football history. In the UEFA Women's Euro 2013 held in Sweden, France stood top of the group, beating Spain, England and Russia to earn its ticket to the quarter-finals. However, Bergeroo's side lost to Denmark in a penalty shootout, thus failing to advance to the semi-finals.

==== 2015 FIFA Women's World Cup ====
In the 2015 FIFA Women's World Cup held in Canada, France was listed to Pot 1, and was a favorite to become champions. France was named to Group F, alongside England, Mexico and Colombia. In the opening match against England, a goal from Eugénie Le Sommer gave France a 1–0 victory. However, France was shocked by Colombia in a 2–0 loss, making Colombia only the second Latin American team to win a Women's World Cup match. Therefore, France's third and final group stage match against Mexico was a must-win. France went on to beat Mexico 5–0 to qualify to the knockout round as top of the group.

In the knockout round, France eased past South Korea in a 3–0 win in Montreal to remain at the same location awaiting the quarter-final match against Germany. In the quarter-final match against Germany, despite dominating the majority of the match, France were unable to capitalize on their chances, which ultimately cost them the game. France were finally able to score in the 64th minute through Louisa Nécib, but failed to keep the lead as Célia Šašić scored on an 83rd-minute penalty kick. The score was 1–1 after 120 minutes, resulting in the match to be decided in a penalty shootout, where France's 5th penalty taken by Claire Lavogez was denied by Nadine Angerer, in which France were eliminated from the tournament losing 4–5 on penalty kicks.

=== Corinne Diacre Era ===
Corinne Diacre was appointed manager of France's women's national team in August 2017. She has led the France national team to success as champions in the SheBelieves Cup in 2017 and runner-ups in 2018. Her time in charge was marked by considerable controversy with a number of veteran players, ultimately leading the France Football Federation to sack Diacre ahead of the 2023 Women's World Cup on 9 March 2023 due to her poor relations with players. "It appears that the dysfunctions observed seem, in this context, irreversible," the federation said in a statement.

==== UEFA Women's Euro 2017 ====
France won all matches at the UEFA Women's Euro 2017 qualifying Group 3. The home matches had sizable crowds, with 7,761 spectators attending the Romania match at the MMArena in Le Mans, 15,028 spectators at the Ukraine match at the Stade du Hainaut in Valenciennes, 24,835 spectators at the Greece match at Roazhon Park in Rennes, and 7,521 spectators at the Albania at Stade Jean-Bouin in Paris. The team scored a win and two draws at the UEFA Women's Euro 2017 Group C, and was defeated by England in quarter-finals.

==== 2019 FIFA Women's World Cup ====
In March 2015, France was selected to host the 2019 FIFA Women's World Cup of the tournament. Having automatically qualified as hosts, France was considered a favorite to win the tournament, along with the United States. The team opened with three victories against Norway, Nigeria, and South Korea, winning its group with a total of 9 points. In the round of 16, France defeated Brazil by a score of 2–1 in extra time, but lost to the United States in the quarterfinal with the same score of 2–1. This Women's World Cup was particularly notable, as it was used as a platform by many women's teams to campaign for equal pay between men and women.

==== UEFA Women's Euro 2022 ====
The UEFA Women’s Euro 2022 was hosted in England. France qualified and was placed in Group D with Belgium, Iceland, and Italy. France finished top of the group with 7 points to advance to the quarterfinals. They beat the Netherlands in extra time 1-0 on July 23, 2022, in Rotherham, England. In the semi-finals, France played Germany on July 27, 2022 where they lost 2-1.

=== Hervé Renard Era ===
Hervé Renard was appointed on 30 March 2023 to be the new manager of France's women's national team with a contract through the Olympic Games in August 2024. On 6 August 2024 he announced his departure.

==== FIFA Women's World Cup 2023 ====
France qualified for the 2023 FIFA Women’s World Cup, which was hosted by Australia and New Zealand. France was placed in Group F with Jamaica, Brazil, and Panama, where they finished top of group with 7 points. In the round of 16, France beat Morocco 4-0 on August 8, 2023, to advance to the quarterfinals. France lost to Australia in penalty shootout, 7-6, on August 12, 2023.

==== Olympic Games 2024 ====
At the 2024 Summer Olympics, France reached the quarter-finals, where they were eliminated by Brazil after a 1–0 defeat. Despite dominating much of the match and missing a first-half penalty through Sakina Karchaoui, France conceded a late goal scored by Gabi Portilho in the 82nd minute.

=== Laurent Bonadei Era ===
Since 23 2024, Laurent Bonadei has managed "les Bleues".

==== UEFA Women's Euro 2025 ====
France qualified for the UEFA Women’s Euro 2025 and were placed in Group D with England, Wales, and the Netherlands. They finished at the top of the group with 9 points and advanced to the quarterfinals. They played Germany and lost in penalty shootout on July 19, 2025.

==== FIFA Women's World Cup 2027 ====
On 9 June 2026, France qualified for the 2027 FIFA Women's World Cup after defeating the Republic of Ireland 1–0.

== Team image ==
=== Nicknames ===
The France women's national football team has been known or nicknamed as the "Les Bleues (The Blues)".

=== Media coverage ===
==== FIFA Women's World Cup ====
| Television channel | Period |
|---|---|
| Direct 8 | 2011 |
| W9 | 2015 |
| TF1 | 2019 |
| France Télévisions, M6 | 2023 |
| M6 | 2027 |

==== UEFA Women's Euro ====
| Television channel | Period |
|---|---|
| Direct 8 | 2009, 2013 |
| France Télévisions | 2017 |
| TF1 | 2022 |
| TF1, France Télévisions | 2025 |

==== Friendly and Qualifiers ====
| Television channel | Period |
|---|---|
| Direct 8, C8, CStar | 2009–2018 |
| W9 | 2019–2023 |

== Overall competitive record ==
=== Overall record ===
| Competition | Stage | Result | Opponent | Position | Top scorer |
|---|---|---|---|---|---|
| 1984 European Championship qualification | 1st Stage | 1–0 0–3; 0–0 2–0; 1–1 0–0 | Italy; Portugal; Switzerland | 2 / 4 | Musset; Musset, Wolf; Musset |
| 1987 European Championship qualification | 1st Stage | 0–1 3–5; 1–3 3–1; 0–4 0–1 | Netherlands; Belgium; Sweden | 2 / 4 | Constantin, Musset, Romagnoli ? |
| (Italy) 1988 Mundialito | 1st Stage | 1–1; 1–1 | England; Italy B | 2 / 3 | Musset; Bernard |
| (Italy) 1988 Mundialito | Semifinals | 0–3 | Italy | | |
| (Italy) 1988 Mundialito | Third place | 0–1 | United States | | |
| 1989 European Championship qualification | 1st Stage | 2–0 0–0; 5–0 2–0; 3–1 0–0; 2–2 0–0 | Belgium; Bulgaria; Spain; Czechoslovakia | 1 / 5 | Musset, Puentes; Baracat, Breton, Mismacq, Musset, Puentes; Musset 2, Loisel; Loisel, Romagnoli |
| 1989 European Championship qualification | Quarterfinals | 1–2 0–2 | Italy | | Musset |
| 1991 European Championship qualification | 1st Stage | 3–1 2–0; 0–2 1–4 | Poland; Sweden | 2 / 3 | Mismacq 2, Le Boulch, Jézéquel, Musset; Jézéquel |
| 1993 European Championship qualification | 1st Stage | 1–4 0–4; 1–1 5–1 | Denmark; Finland | 2 / 3 | Jézéquel; Fusier 2, Bernauer, Cassauba, Locatelli, Petit |
| 1995 European Championship qualification | 1st Stage | 0–2 1–1; 1–0 3–0; 1–0 3–0 | Italy; Portugal; Scotland | 2 / 4 | Sykora; Sykora 2, Gout, Richoux; Béghé, Guitti, Hillion, Pichon |
| 1997 European Championship qualification | 1st Stage | 3–3 3–0; 0–0 0–1; 1–1 2–1 | Iceland; Russia; Netherlands | 2 / 4 | Pichon 4, Sykora + 1 o.g. Gout, Henriques, Pichon |
| 1997 European Championship qualification | Repechage | 2–0 3–0 | Finland | | Pichon 2, Diacre, Roujas, Woock |
| (Norway) / (Sweden) 1997 European Championship | 1st Stage | 1–1; 3–1; 0–3 | Spain; Russia; Sweden | 3 / 4 | Roujas; Roujas 3 |
| 1999 World Cup qualification | 1st Stage (Class A) | 2–1 3–0; 2–2 0–1; 0–0 2–3 | Switzerland; Finland; Italy | 3 / 4 | Lattaf 2, Lagrevol, Roujas + 1 o.g. Lagrevol, Pichon; Pichon, Soubeyrand |
| 2001 European Championship qualification | 1st Stage (Class A) | 2–2 2–0; 1–1 2–1; 1–0 2–1 | Sweden; Netherlands; Spain | 1 / 4 | Jézéquel 2, Herbert, Zenoni; Diacre 2, Lattaf; Béghé 2, Diacre |
| (Germany) 2001 European Championship | 1st Stage | 0–3; 3–4; 2–0 | Norway; Denmark; Italy | 4 / 4 | Béghé, Blouet, Pichon; Jézéquel, Pichon |
| 2003 World Cup qualification | 1st Stage (Class A) | 0–3 1–3; 2–0 2–1; 2–1 4–1 | Norway; Ukraine; Czech Republic | 2 / 4 | Pichon; Pichon 3, Soubeyrand; Pichon 3, Béghé, Blouin, Soubeyrand |
| 2003 World Cup qualification | Repechage | 1–0 1–0 | England | | Diacre, Pichon |
| (United States) 2003 World Cup | 1st Stage | 0–2; 1–0; 1–1 | Norway; South Korea; Brazil | 3 / 4 | Pichon; Pichon |
| 2005 European Championship qualification | 1st Stage (Class A) | 4–0 6–0; 2–0 3–0; 7–1 5–1; 3–0 2–5 | Hungary; Iceland; Poland; Russia | 1 / 5 | Pichon 5, Lattaf 2, Béghé, Bompastor, Tonazzi; Lattaf 2, Tonazzi 2, Béghé; Pichon 6, Diacre, Diguelman, Herbert, Lattaf, Tonazzi, Woock; Lattaf 2, Pichon 2, Tonazzi |
| (England) 2005 European Championship | 1st Stage | 3–1; 1–1; 0–3 | Italy; Norway; Germany | 3 / 4 | Pichon 2, Lattaf; Béghé |
| 2007 World Cup qualification | 1st Stage (Class A) | 0–1 2–0; 3–1 2–1; 2–0 5–0; 0–0 1–1 | Netherlands; Austria; Hungary; England | 2 / 5 | Soubeyrand 2 Bussaglia 2, Soubeyrand 2, Pichon; Pichon 2, Soubeyrand 2, Bompastor, Lattaf, Tonazzi; Diguelman |
| 2009 European Championship qualification | 1st Stage | 6–0 5–0; 6–0 2–0; 0–1 2–1; 8–0 2–0 | Greece; Slovenia; Iceland; Serbia | 1 / 5 | Abily 3, Soubeyrand 2, Lattaf, Nécib, Franco, Herbert, Thomis; Bussaglia 2, Lattaf 2, Abily, Thiney, Thomis + 1 o.g. Herbert, Soubeyrand; Brétigny 3, Thomis 2, Abily, Bussaglia, Nécib, Thiney, Traïkia |
| (Finland) 2009 European Championship | 1st Stage | 3–1; 1–5; 1–1 | Iceland; Germany; Norway | 3 / 4 | Abily, Bompastor, Nécib; Thiney; Abily |
| (Finland) 2009 European Championship | Quarterfinals | 0–0 (PSO: 4–5) | Netherlands | | (penalty scored) : 1 Soubeyrand, 2 Abily, 3 Henry, 4 Le Sommer (penalty missed) : 5 Franco, 6 Meilleroux, 7 Herbert |
| 2011 World Cup qualification | 1st Stage | 7–0 3–0; 2–0 1–0; 12–0 6–0; 2–0 7–0; 6–0 4–0 | Croatia; Iceland; Estonia; Serbia; Northern Ireland | 1 / 6 | Delie 2, Franco 2, Le Sommer 2, Abily, Soubeyrand, Thiney, Thomis; Thiney 2, Thomis; Delie 4, Thiney 4, Herbert 2, Thomis 2, Abily, Bussaglia, Franco, Nécib, Le Sommer + 1 o.g. Thiney 4, Abily 2, Bussaglia, Delie, Thomis; Bompastor 2, Delie 2, Le Sommer 2, Abily, Franco, Nécib + 1 o.g. |
| 2011 World Cup qualification | Direct qualification | 0–0 3–2 | Italy | | Bussaglia, Thiney, Bompastor |
| (Germany) 2011 World Cup | 1st Stage | 1–0; 4–0; 2–4 | Nigeria; Canada; Germany | 2 / 4 | Delie; Thiney 2, Abily, Thomis; Delie, Georges |
| (Germany) 2011 World Cup | Quarterfinals | 1–1 (PSO: 4–3) | England | | Bussaglia — (penalty scored) : 2 Bussaglia, 3 Thiney, 4. Bompastor, 5 Le Sommer (penalty missed) : 1 Abily |
| (Germany) 2011 World Cup | Semifinals | 1–3 | United States | | Bompastor |
| (Germany) 2011 World Cup | Third place | 1–2 | Sweden | | Thomis |
| (United Kingdom) 2012 Summer Olympics | 1st Stage | 2–4; 5–0; 1–0 | United States; North Korea; Colombia | 2 / 4 | Delie, Thiney; Catala, Delie, Georges, Renard, Thomis; Thomis |
| (United Kingdom) 2012 Summer Olympics | Quarterfinals | 2–1 | Sweden | | Georges, Renard |
| (United Kingdom) 2012 Summer Olympics | Semifinals | 1–2 | Japan | | Le Sommer |
| (United Kingdom) 2012 Summer Olympics | Bronze match | 0–1 | Canada | | |
| 2013 European Championship qualification | 1st Stage | 5–0 5–0; 3–1 4–0; 4–1 4–0; 2–0 5–0 | Israel (Republic of Ireland) Ireland; Wales; Scotland | 1 / 5 | Thiney 3, Abily, Bompastor, Delie, Franco, Rubio, Le Sommer + 1 o.g. Le Sommer 3, Delie, Morel, Nécib, Thomis; Thomis 3, Thiney 2, Abily, Delie, Le Sommer; Delie 2, Le Sommer 2, Nécib, Renard + 1 o.g. |
| (Sweden) 2013 European Championship | 1st Stage | 3–1; 1–0; 3–0 | Russia; Spain; England | 1 / 4 | Delie 2, Le Sommer; Renard; Le Sommer, Necib, Renard |
| (Sweden) 2013 European Championship | Quarterfinals | 1–1 (PSO: 2–4) | Denmark | | Necib — (penalty scored) : 2 Thiney, 3 Le Sommer (penalty missed) : 1 Necib, 4 Delannoy |
| 2015 World Cup qualification | 1st Stage | 4–0 7–0; 3–1 3–1; 10–0 14–0; 4–0 4–0; 2–0 3–1 | Kazakhstan; Austria; Bulgaria; Hungary; Finland | 1 / 6 | Thiney 4, Delie 3, Abily 2, Delannoy, Thomis; Bussaglia, Delie, Henry, Necib, Renard, Thomis; Thiney 8, Le Sommer 5, Renard 4, Delie 3, Abily, Bussaglia, Georges, Necib; Le Sommer 2, Abily, Delie, Majri, Thiney, Thomis + 1 o.g. Necib 2, Bussaglia, Delie, Thiney |
| (Canada) 2015 World Cup | 1st Stage | 1–0; 0–2; 5–0 | England; Colombia; Mexico | 1 / 4 | Le Sommer Le Sommer 2, Delie, Henry + 1 o.g. |
| (Canada) 2015 World Cup | Round of 16 | 3–0 | South Korea | | Delie 2, Thomis |
| (Canada) 2015 World Cup | Quarterfinals | 1–1 (PSO: 4–5) | Germany | | Necib — (penalty scored) : 1 Thiney, 2 Abily, 3 Necib, 4 Renard (penalty missed) : 5 Lavogez |
| 2017 European Championship qualification | 1st Stage | 6–0 6–0; 3–0 1–0; 3–0 1–0; 3–0 4–0 | Albania; Greece; Romania; Ukraine | 1 / 5 | Houara 2, Le Sommer 4, Le Bihan 3, Hamraoui 2, Delie; Le Sommer 2, Bilbault, Le Bihan; Le Sommer 2, Delie, Bussaglia; Majri 2, Delie, Bussaglia, Hamraoui, Abily + 1 o.g. |
| (Brazil) 2016 Summer Olympics | 1st Stage | 4–0; 0–1; 3–0 | Colombia; United States; New Zealand | 2 / 4 | Le Sommer, Abily, Majri + 1 o.g. Le Sommer, Cadamuro 2 |
| (Brazil) 2016 Summer Olympics | Quarterfinals | 0–1 | Canada | | |
| (Netherlands) 2017 European Championship | 1st Stage | 1–0; 1–1; 1–1 | Iceland; Austria; Switzerland | 2 / 4 | Le Sommer; Henry; Abily |
| (Netherlands) 2017 European Championship | Quarterfinals | 0–1 | England | | |
| (France) 2019 World Cup | 1st Stage | 4–0; 2–1; 1–0 | South Korea; Norway; Nigeria | 1 / 4 | Le Sommer, Renard 2, Henry; Gauvin, Le Sommer; Renard |
| (France) 2019 World Cup | Round of 16 | 2–1 (a.e.t.) | Brazil | | Gauvin, Henry |
| (France) 2019 World Cup | Quarterfinals | 1–2 | United States | | Renard |
| 2022 European Championship qualification | 1st Stage | 3–0 12–0; 6–0 2–0; 7–0 11–0; 0–0 3–0 | Kazakhstan; Serbia; North Macedonia; Austria | 1 / 5 | Gauvin, Le Sommer, Katoto 3, De Almeida, Diani 2, Dali, Périsset, Cascarino, Laurent, Morroni, Baltimore, Matéo; Majri 4, Geyoro, Katoto, Asseyi + 1 o.g. Le Sommer 6, Katoto, De Almeida 3, Torrent, Asseyi 2, Gauvin, Diani, Geyoro 2, Cascarino; Renard, Katoto 2 |
| (England) 2022 European Championship | 1st Stage | 5–1; 2–1; 1–1 | Italy; Belgium; Iceland | 1 / 4 | Geyoro 3, Katoto, Cascarino; Diani, Mbock Bathy; Malard |
| (England) 2022 European Championship | Quarterfinals | 1–0 | Netherlands | | Périsset |
| (England) 2022 European Championship | Semifinals | 1–2 | Germany | | Popp |
| 2023 World Cup qualification | 1st Stage | 10–0 5–1; 3–2 1–0; 11–0 9–0; 5–0 6–0; 2–0 2–1 | Greece; Slovenia; Estonia; Kazakhstan; Wales | 1 / 6 | Majri, Geyoro 3, Katoto 3, Diani 3, Asseyi, Renard, Malard, Baltimore +1 o.g. Katoto 2, Majri, Cascarino; Geyoro 2, Katoto, Périsset 25' (pen.), Cascarino 2, Toletti, Diani, Tounkara 2, Dali 2, Sarr 4, Matéo 2 + 2 o.g. Katoto 3, Dali 2, Malard 2, Asseyi, Cascarino, Périsset, Gauvin; Diani, Bacha, Renard, Katoto |
| (Australia) (New Zealand) 2023 World Cup | 1st Stage | 0–0; 2–1; 6–3 | Jamaica; Brazil; Panama | 1 / 4 | Le Sommer, Renard; Lakrar, Diani 3, Le Garrec, Bècho |
| (Australia) (New Zealand) 2023 World Cup | Round of 16 | 4–0 | Morocco | | Diani, Dali, Le Sommer 2 |
| (Australia) (New Zealand) 2023 World Cup | Quarterfinals | 0–0(PSO: 6–7) | Australia | | (penalty scored) : 2 Diani, 3 Renard, 4 Le Sommer, 6 Geyoro, 7 Karchaoui, 8Lakrar (penalty missed) : 1 Bacha, 5 Périsset, 9 Dali, 10 Bècho |

== Results and fixtures ==
The following is a list of match results in the last 12 months, as well as any future matches that have been scheduled.

Legend

Win Draw Loss Fixture

=== 2025 ===
| 28 November 2025 UEFA Nations League 3rd/F | France | 2–1 | Sweden | Reims |
| 21:10 | Karchaoui 45+3' (pen.); Mbock Bathy 90+6' | Report | Blackstenius 67' | Stadium: Stade Auguste-Delaune; Attendance: 7,091; Referee: Désirée Blanco (Switzerland) |

| 2 December 2025 UEFA Nations League 3rd/F | Sweden | 2–2 (a.e.t.) (3–4 agg.) | France | Solna |
| 19:00 | Ijeh 84'; Kafaji 90+2' | Report | Mateo 58'; Gago 106' | Stadium: Strawberry Arena; Attendance: 9,141; Referee: Marta Huerta de Aza (Spain) |

=== 2026 ===
| 3 March 2027 FIFA Women's World Cup qualification | Republic of Ireland | 1–2 | France | Dublin |
| 19:30 (18:30 UTC) | McCabe 12' | Report | Malard 71', 79' | Stadium: Tallaght Stadium; Attendance: 8,376; Referee: Tess Olofsson (Sweden) |

| 7 March 2027 FIFA Women's World Cup qualification | France | 4–1 | Poland | Dijon |
| 21:10 | Katoto 20', 40'; Karchaoui 59' (pen.); Diani 71' | Report | Pajor 29' | Stadium: Stade Gaston Gérard; Referee: Alina Peşu (Romania) |

| 14 April 2027 FIFA Women's World Cup qualification | Netherlands | 2–1 | France | Breda |
| 20:45 | van Asten 11'; Brugts 68' | Report | Baltimore 54' | Stadium: Rat Verlegh Stadion; Attendance: 6,503; Referee: Marta Huerta De Aza (Spain) |

| 18 April 2027 FIFA Women's World Cup qualification | France | 1–1 | Netherlands | Auxerre |
| 21:10 | Katoto 45+1' | Report | Kaptein 76' | Stadium: Stade de l'Abbé-Deschamps; Attendance: 8,334; Referee: Maria Sole Ferrieri Caputi (Italy) |

| 5 June 2027 FIFA Women's World Cup qualification | Poland | 0–2 | France | Gdańsk |
| 18:00 | | Report (FIFA); Report (UEFA) | Malard 47'; Baltimore 63' | Stadium: Gdańsk Stadium; Attendance: 11,713; Referee: Kirsty Dowle (England) |

| 9 June 2027 FIFA Women's World Cup qualification | France | 1–0 | Republic of Ireland | Grenoble |
| 21:00 | Malard 40' | Report (FIFA); Report (UEFA) | | Stadium: Stade des Alpes; Attendance: 7,559; Referee: Désirée Blanco (Switzerland) |

| 10 October Friendly | France | 9–0 | Latvia | Laval |
| 21:00 | Diani 9'; Le Moguédec 12', 40'; Malard 20'; Geyoro 31'; Hurtré 45+1'; Gago 59'; Mateo 66'; Katoto 82' | Report | | Stadium: Stade Francis Le Basser; Attendance: 7,434; Referee: Stacey Pearson (England) |

| 27 November Friendly | France | v | Venezuela | Tomblaine |
| 21:00 | | Report | | Stadium: Stade Marcel Picot |

| 5 December Friendly | France | v | Morocco | Montbéliard |
| 21:10 | | Report | | Stadium: Stade Auguste-Bonal |

== Coaching staff ==
=== Current personnel ===
As of 27 July 2025.

| Position | Name |
|---|---|
| Head coach | (France) Laurent Bonadei |
| Assistant coaches | (France) Stéphane Saillant (France) Sabrina Viguier |
| Goalkeeping coach | (France) Lionel Letizi |

=== Managerial history ===
- (France) Pierre Geoffroy (1971–1978)
- (France) Francis-Pierre Coché (1978–1987)
- (France) Aimé Mignot (1987–1997)
- (France) Élisabeth Loisel (1997–2007)
- (France) Bruno Bini (2007–2013)
- (France) Philippe Bergeroo (2013–2016)
- (France) Olivier Echouafni (2016–2017)
- (France) Corinne Diacre (2017–2023)
- (France) Hervé Renard (2023–2024)
- (France) Laurent Bonadei (2024–present)

== Players ==
=== Current squad ===
The following 24 players were called up for the friendly matches against Venezuela and Morocco on 27 November and 5 December 2026, respectively.

Caps and goals correct as of 10 October 2026, after the match against the Latvia.

| No. | Pos. | Player | Date of birth (age) | Caps | Goals | Club |
|---|---|---|---|---|---|---|
| | GK | Pauline Peyraud-Magnin | 17 March 1992 (age 34) | 77 | 0 | (The Football Association) Crystal Palace |
| | GK | Constance Picaud | 5 July 1998 (age 28) | 17 | 0 | (The Football Association) West Ham United |
| | GK | Mylène Chavas | 7 January 1998 (age 28) | 1 | 0 | (French Football Federation) Paris FC |
| | DF | Griedge Mbock (captain) | 26 February 1995 (age 31) | 99 | 9 | (French Football Federation) Paris Saint-Germain |
| | DF | Selma Bacha | 9 November 2000 (age 26) | 55 | 3 | (French Football Federation) Lyon |
| | DF | Élisa De Almeida | 11 January 1998 (age 28) | 52 | 5 | (The Football Association) Arsenal |
| | DF | Maëlle Lakrar | 27 May 2000 (age 26) | 41 | 3 | (Royal Spanish Football Federation) Real Madrid |
| | DF | Thiniba Samoura | 11 February 2004 (age 22) | 17 | 0 | (French Football Federation) Paris Saint-Germain |
| | DF | Perle Morroni | 15 October 1997 (age 29) | 14 | 2 | (United States Soccer Federation) San Diego Wave |
| | DF | Wassa Sangaré | 16 March 2006 (age 20) | 3 | 0 | (French Football Federation) Lyon |
| | MF | Grace Geyoro | 2 July 1997 (age 29) | 114 | 24 | (The Football Association) London City Lionesses |
| | MF | Sandy Baltimore | 19 February 2000 (age 26) | 58 | 12 | (The Football Association) Chelsea |
| | MF | Oriane Jean-François | 14 August 2001 (age 25) | 27 | 0 | (The Football Association) Aston Villa |
| | MF | Anaële Le Moguédec | 12 June 2001 (age 25) | 6 | 2 | (French Football Federation) Paris FC |
| | MF | Laurina Fazer | 13 October 2003 (age 23) | 5 | 0 | (United States Soccer Federation) San Diego Wave |
| | MF | Océane Hurtré | 17 February 2004 (age 22) | 1 | 1 | (The Football Association) Birmingham City |
| | MF | Julie Swierot | 14 March 2006 (age 20) | 1 | 0 | (French Football Federation) Lyon |
| | FW | Kadidiatou Diani | 1 April 1995 (age 31) | 127 | 33 | (The Football Association) London City Lionesses |
| | FW | Delphine Cascarino | 5 February 1997 (age 29) | 86 | 16 | (The Football Association) London City Lionesses |
| | FW | Marie-Antoinette Katoto | 1 November 1998 (age 28) | 67 | 44 | (French Football Federation) Lyon |
| | FW | Clara Mateo | 28 November 1997 (age 28) | 50 | 11 | (French Football Federation) Paris FC |
| | FW | Vicki Bècho | 3 October 2003 (age 23) | 21 | 2 | (French Football Federation) Lyon |
| | FW | Kelly Gago | 5 January 1999 (age 27) | 15 | 4 | (The Football Association) West Ham United |
| | FW | Liana Joseph | 15 August 2006 (age 20) | 0 | 0 | (French Football Federation) Lyon |

=== Recent call-ups ===
The following players have also been called up to the squad within the past 12 months.

| Pos. | Player | Date of birth (age) | Caps | Goals | Club | Latest call-up |
|---|---|---|---|---|---|---|
| GK | Alice Pinguet | 29 June 2002 (age 24) | 0 | 0 | (Spain) Valencia | v. Latvia, 10 October 2026 |
| DF | Estelle Cascarino | 5 February 1997 (age 29) | 19 | 1 | (England) West Ham United | v. Latvia, 10 October 2026 |
| DF | Alice Sombath | 16 October 2003 (age 23) | 17 | 0 | (England) Tottenham Hotspur | v. Latvia, 10 October 2026 |
| DF | Melween N'Dongala | 6 September 2004 (age 22) | 13 | 0 | (France) Paris FC | v. Latvia, 10 October 2026 |
| DF | Lou Bogaert | 25 June 2004 (age 22) | 6 | 0 | (Germany) VfL Wolfsburg | v. Republic of Ireland, 9 June 2026 |
| MF | Sakina Karchaoui | 26 January 1996 (age 30) | 103 | 6 | (France) Paris Saint-Germain | v. Latvia, 10 October 2026 |
| MF | Anaïs Ebayilin | 17 December 2007 (age 18) | 2 | 0 | (France) Paris Saint-Germain | v. Latvia, 10 October 2026 |
| MF | Maeline Mendy | 26 December 2006 (age 19) | 0 | 0 | (France) Lyon | v. Republic of Ireland, 9 June 2026 |
| FW | Melvine Malard | 28 June 2000 (age 26) | 42 | 15 | (England) Chelsea | v. Latvia, 10 October 2026 |
| FW | Lucie Calba | 24 February 2005 (age 21) | 0 | 0 | (France) Fleury | v. Republic of Ireland, 9 June 2026 |
| FW | Justine Rouquet | 6 June 2007 (age 19) | 0 | 0 | (France) Montpellier | v. Republic of Ireland, 9 June 2026 |
| FW | Naomie Feller | 6 November 2001 (age 25) | 9 | 1 | (France) Paris Saint-Germain | v. Netherlands, 18 April 2026 |
| FW | Kessya Bussy | 19 June 2001 (age 25) | 11 | 1 | (Germany) VfL Wolfsburg | v. Poland, 7 March 2026 |
Notes: ^{INJ} = Withdrew due to injury; ^{PRE} = Preliminary squad; ^{RET} = Retired from the national team; ^{SUS} = Serving suspension; ^{WD} = Player withdrew from the squad due to non-injury issue

=== Previous squads ===
FIFA Women's World Cup squads

- 2003 FIFA Women's World Cup
- 2011 FIFA Women's World Cup
- 2015 FIFA Women's World Cup
- 2019 FIFA Women's World Cup

UEFA European Championships squads

- 2009 UEFA Women's Euro
- 2013 UEFA Women's Euro
- 2017 UEFA Women's Euro
- 2022 UEFA Women's Euro

Summer Olympics squads

- 2012 Summer Olympics
- 2016 Summer Olympics

== Individual records ==
As of 10 October 2026
Players in bold are still active with France.

Most appearances
| Rank | Player | Career | Caps | Goals |
|---|---|---|---|---|
| 1 | **Eugénie Le Sommer** | 2009–present | 200 | 94 |
| 2 | Sandrine Soubeyrand | 1997–2013 | 198 | 17 |
| 3 | Élise Bussaglia | 2003–2019 | 192 | 30 |
| 4 | Laura Georges | 2001–2018 | 188 | 7 |
| 5 | Camille Abily | 2001–2017 | 183 | 37 |
| 6 | **Wendie Renard** | 2011–present | 168 | 39 |
| 7 | Gaëtane Thiney | 2007–2019 | 163 | 58 |
| 8 | Sonia Bompastor | 2000–2012 | 156 | 19 |
| 9 | Sarah Bouhaddi | 2004–2020 | 149 | 0 |
| 10 | Louisa Nécib | 2005–2016 | 145 | 36 |

Top goalscorers
| Rank | Player | Career | Goals | Caps | Avg. |
|---|---|---|---|---|---|
| 1 | **Eugénie Le Sommer** | 2009–present | 94 | 200 | 0.47 |
| 2 | Marinette Pichon | 1994–2008 | 81 | 112 | 0.72 |
| 3 | Marie-Laure Delie | 2009–2017 | 65 | 123 | 0.53 |
| 4 | Gaëtane Thiney | 2007–2019 | 58 | 163 | 0.36 |
| 5 | **Marie-Antoinette Katoto** | 2018–present | 44 | 67 | 0.66 |
| 6 | **Wendie Renard** | 2011–present | 39 | 168 | 0.23 |
| 7 | Camille Abily | 2001–2017 | 37 | 183 | 0.20 |
| 8 | Louisa Nécib | 2005–2016 | 36 | 145 | 0.25 |
| 9 | **Kadidiatou Diani** | 2014–present | 33 | 127 | 0.26 |
| 10 | Élodie Thomis | 2005–2017 | 32 | 141 | 0.23 |

== Honours ==
=== Major competitions ===
- UEFA Women's Nations League
  - Runners-up (1): 2024
  - Third place (1): 2025

=== Friendly ===
- Cyprus Cup
  - Winners: 2012, 2014
- SheBelieves Cup
  - Winner: 2017
- Tournoi de France
  - Winner: 2020, 2022, 2023

== Competitive record ==
=== FIFA Women's World Cup ===
| FIFA Women's World Cup record | | | | | | | | | Qualification record | | | | | |
| Year | Result | Position | Pld | W | D* | L | GF | GA | Pld | W | D* | L | GF | GA |
|---|---|---|---|---|---|---|---|---|---|---|---|---|---|---|
| (China) 1991 | Did not qualify | | | | | | | | UEFA Euro 1991 | | | | | |
| (Sweden) 1995 | Did not qualify | | | | | | | | UEFA Euro 1995 | | | | | |
| (United States) 1999 | Did not qualify | | | | | | | | 6 | 2 | 2 | 2 | 9 | 7 |
| (United States) 2003 | Group stage | 9th | 3 | 1 | 1 | 1 | 2 | 3 | 10 | 7 | 1 | 2 | 16 | 10 |
| (China) 2007 | Did not qualify | | | | | | | | 8 | 5 | 2 | 1 | 15 | 4 |
| (Germany) 2011 | Fourth place | 4th | 6 | 2 | 1 | 3 | 10 | 10 | 12 | 11 | 1 | 0 | 53 | 2 |
| (Canada) 2015 | Quarter-finals | 5th | 5 | 3 | 1 | 1 | 10 | 3 | 10 | 10 | 0 | 0 | 54 | 4 |
| (France) 2019 | Quarter-finals | 6th | 5 | 4 | 0 | 1 | 10 | 4 | Qualified as host | | | | | |
| (Australia) (New Zealand) 2023 | Quarter-finals | 6th | 5 | 3 | 2 | 0 | 12 | 4 | 10 | 10 | 0 | 0 | 54 | 3 |
| (Brazil) 2027 | Qualified | | | | | | | | 6 | 4 | 1 | 1 | 11 | 5 |
| (Costa Rica) (Jamaica) (Mexico) (United States) 2031 | To be determined | | | | | | | | To be determined | | | | | |
| (United Kingdom) 2035 | To be determined | | | | | | | | To be determined | | | | | |
| Total | 6/10 | 0 Titles | 24 | 13 | 5 | 6 | 44 | 24 | 56 | 45 | 6 | 5 | 201 | 29 |

*Draws include knockout matches decided by penalty kicks.

==== Match history ====
FIFA Women's World Cup Finals history
| Year | Round | Date | Opponent | Result | Stadium |
|---|---|---|---|---|---|
| (United States) 2003 | Group stage | 20 September | Norway | L 0–2 | Lincoln Financial Field, Philadelphia |
| (United States) 2003 | Group stage | 24 September | South Korea | W 1–0 | RFK Stadium, Washington |
| (United States) 2003 | Group stage | 27 September | Brazil | D 1–1 | RFK Stadium, Washington |
| (Germany) 2011 | Group stage | 26 June | Nigeria | W 1–0 | Rhein-Neckar-Arena, Sinsheim |
| (Germany) 2011 | Group stage | 30 June | Canada | W 4–0 | Ruhrstadion, Bochum |
| (Germany) 2011 | Group stage | 5 July | Germany | L 2–4 | Borussia-Park, Mönchengladbach |
| (Germany) 2011 | Quarter-finals | 9 July | England | D 1–1 (4–3 (p)) | BayArena, Leverkusen |
| (Germany) 2011 | Semi-finals | 13 July | United States | L 1–3 | Borussia-Park, Mönchengladbach |
| (Germany) 2011 | Third place play-off | 16 July | Sweden | L 1–2 | Rhein-Neckar-Arena, Sinsheim |
| (Canada) 2015 | Group stage | 9 June | England | W 1–0 | Moncton Stadium, Moncton |
| (Canada) 2015 | Group stage | 13 June | Colombia | L 0–2 | Moncton Stadium, Moncton |
| (Canada) 2015 | Group stage | 17 June | Mexico | W 5–0 | Lansdowne Stadium, Ottawa |
| (Canada) 2015 | Round of 16 | 21 June | South Korea | W 3–0 | Olympic Stadium, Montreal |
| (Canada) 2015 | Quarter-finals | 26 June | Germany | D 1–1 (4–5 (p)) | Olympic Stadium, Montreal |
| (France) 2019 | Group stage | 7 June | South Korea | W 4–0 | Parc des Princes, Paris |
| (France) 2019 | Group stage | 12 June | Norway | W 2–1 | Allianz Riviera, Nice |
| (France) 2019 | Group stage | 17 June | Nigeria | W 1–0 | Roazhon Park, Rennes |
| (France) 2019 | Round of 16 | 23 June | Brazil | W 2–1 (a.e.t.) | Stade Océane, Le Havre |
| (France) 2019 | Quarter-finals | 28 June | United States | L 1–2 | Parc des Princes, Paris |
| (Australia) (New Zealand) 2023 | Group stage | 23 July | Jamaica | D 0–0 | Sydney Football Stadium, Sydney |
| (Australia) (New Zealand) 2023 | Group stage | 29 July | Brazil | W 2–1 | Lang Park, Brisbane |
| (Australia) (New Zealand) 2023 | Group stage | 2 August | Panama | W 6–3 | Sydney Football Stadium, Sydney |
| (Australia) (New Zealand) 2023 | Round of 16 | 8 August | Morocco | W 4–0 | Hindmarsh Stadium, Adelaide |
| (Australia) (New Zealand) 2023 | Quarter-finals | 12 August | Australia | D 0–0 (6–7 (p)) | Lang Park, Brisbane |

=== Olympic Games ===
Summer Olympics record
| Year | Result | Position | Pld | W | D | L | GF | GA |
|---|---|---|---|---|---|---|---|---|
| (United States) 1996 | Did not qualify | | | | | | | |
| (Australia) 2000 | Did not qualify | | | | | | | |
| (Greece) 2004 | Did not qualify | | | | | | | |
| (China) 2008 | Did not qualify | | | | | | | |
| (United Kingdom) 2012 | Fourth place | 4th | 6 | 3 | 0 | 3 | 11 | 8 |
| (Brazil) 2016 | Quarter-finals | 6th | 4 | 2 | 0 | 2 | 7 | 2 |
| (Japan) 2020 | Did not qualify | | | | | | | |
| (France) 2024 | Quarter-finals | 6th | 4 | 2 | 0 | 2 | 6 | 6 |
| (United States) 2028 | To be determined | | | | | | | |
| (Australia) 2032 | To be determined | | | | | | | |
| Total | 3/8 | 0 Titles | 14 | 7 | 0 | 7 | 24 | 16 |

=== UEFA Women's Championship ===
| UEFA Women's Championship record | | | | | | | | | Qualification record | | | | | | | |
| Year | Result | Position | Pld | W | D* | L | GF | GA | Pld | W | D* | L | GF | GA | P/R | Rnk |
|---|---|---|---|---|---|---|---|---|---|---|---|---|---|---|---|---|
| 1984 | Did not qualify | | | | | | | | 6 | 2 | 3 | 1 | 4 | 4 | – | |
| (Norway) 1987 | Did not qualify | | | | | | | | 6 | 1 | 0 | 5 | 7 | 15 | – | |
| (West Germany) 1989 | Did not qualify | | | | | | | | 10 | 4 | 4 | 2 | 15 | 3 | – | |
| (Denmark) 1991 | Did not qualify | | | | | | | | 4 | 2 | 0 | 2 | 6 | 7 | – | |
| (Italy) 1993 | Did not qualify | | | | | | | | 4 | 1 | 1 | 2 | 7 | 10 | – | |
| (England) (Germany) (Norway) (Sweden) 1995 | Did not qualify | | | | | | | | 6 | 4 | 1 | 1 | 9 | 3 | – | |
| (Norway) (Sweden) 1997 | Group stage | 6th | 3 | 1 | 1 | 1 | 4 | 5 | 8 | 4 | 3 | 1 | 14 | 6 | – | |
| (Germany) 2001 | Group stage | 6th | 3 | 1 | 0 | 2 | 5 | 7 | 6 | 4 | 2 | 0 | 10 | 5 | – | |
| (England) 2005 | Group stage | 6th | 3 | 1 | 1 | 1 | 4 | 5 | 8 | 7 | 0 | 1 | 32 | 7 | – | |
| (Finland) 2009 | Quarter-finals | 8th | 4 | 1 | 2 | 1 | 5 | 7 | 8 | 7 | 0 | 1 | 31 | 2 | – | |
| (Sweden) 2013 | Quarter-finals | 5th | 4 | 3 | 1 | 0 | 8 | 2 | 8 | 8 | 0 | 0 | 32 | 2 | – | |
| (Netherlands) 2017 | Quarter-finals | 6th | 4 | 1 | 2 | 1 | 3 | 3 | 8 | 8 | 0 | 0 | 27 | 0 | – | |
| (England) 2022 | Semi-finals | 3rd | 5 | 3 | 1 | 1 | 10 | 5 | 8 | 7 | 1 | 0 | 44 | 0 | – | |
| (Switzerland) 2025 | Quarter-finals | 5th | 4 | 3 | 1 | 0 | 12 | 5 | 6 | 4 | 0 | 2 | 8 | 7 | (Note: From Euro 2025 onwards a new qualifying format was introduced, linked to the Women's Nations League where teams are divided into leagues with promotion/relegation between the leagues at the end of each cycle.) | 3rd |
| (Germany) 2029 | | | | | | | | | | | | | | | | |
| Total | 8/14 | 0 Titles | 30 | 14 | 9 | 7 | 51 | 39 | 96 | 63 | 15 | 18 | 246 | 71 | 3rd | |

*Draws include knockout matches decided via penalty shoot-out.

=== UEFA Women's Nations League ===
UEFA Women's Nations League record
| League phase | | | | | | | | | | | | Finals | | | | | | | |
| Season | LG | GP | Pos | Pld | W | D | L | GF | GA | P/R | RK | Year | Pos | Pld | W | D | L | GF | GA |
|---|---|---|---|---|---|---|---|---|---|---|---|---|---|---|---|---|---|---|---|
| 2023–24 | A | 2 | 1st | 6 | 5 | 1 | 0 | 9 | 1 | Same position | 1st | (France) (Netherlands) (Spain) 2024 | Runners-up | 2 | 1 | 0 | 1 | 2 | 3 |
| 2025 | A | 2 | 1st | 6 | 6 | 0 | 0 | 14 | 2 | Same position | 1st | (France) (Germany) (Spain) (Sweden) 2025 | Third place | 4 | 1 | 2 | 1 | 6 | 6 |
| Total | | | | 12 | 11 | 1 | 0 | 23 | 3 | 1st | | Total | 0 Titles | 6 | 2 | 2 | 2 | 8 | 9 |

| ▲ | Promoted at end of season |
| Same position | No movement at end of season |
| ▼ | Relegated at end of season |
| * | Participated in promotion/relegation play-offs |

== See also ==
- Sport in France
  - Football in France
    - Women's football in France
- France women's national under-19 football team
- France women's national under-17 football team
- FIFA Women's World Cup
- UEFA Women's Championship
