= 2010–11 Division 1 Féminine =

Division 1 Féminine
- Season: 2010–11
- Champions: Lyon (9th title)
- Relegated: Le Mans; Toulouse; La Roche-sur-Yon
- Champions League: Lyon; Paris Saint-Germain
- Matches: 126
- Goals: 394 (3.13 per match)
- Top goalscorer: Laëtitia Tonazzi (20 goals)
- Biggest home win: Lyon 13–0 Nord Allier (17 October 2010)
- Biggest away win: Nord Allier 0–5 Lyon (15 December 2010); Le Mans 0–5 Montpellier (6 February 2011)
- Highest scoring: Lyon 13–0 Nord Allier (17 October 2010)
- Longest winning run: 22 games Lyon (5 September – present)
- Longest unbeaten run: 22 games Lyon (5 September – present)
- Longest losing run: 6 games La Roche-sur-Yon (30 October – 23 January)

The 2010–11 Division 1 Féminine season was the 37th since its establishment. Lyon were the defending champions. The fixtures were announced in August 2010. The season began on 5 September 2010 and ended early on 31 May 2011, in order to increase the fitness of national team players ahead of the 2011 FIFA Women's World Cup. There were two promoted teams from the Division 2 Féminine, replacing the two teams that were relegated from Division 1 Féminine following the 2009–10 season. A total of 12 teams competed in the league with two clubs suffering relegation to the second division, the Division 2 Féminine.

On 27 March 2011, Lyon successfully defended its title after defeating title rivals Montpellier 1–0 at the Stade Jules Rimet in Sussargues. The title is the club's fifth consecutive in the Division 1 Féminine and its ninth overall dating back to its FC Lyon years. The win also places Lyon in the 2011–12 edition of the UEFA Women's Champions League. Lyon eventually finished the season unbeaten. The runner-up place, which qualified for the Champions League too, was decided on the final match day in a direct encounter between Paris Saint-Germain and Montpellier. Paris ranked third before the match and had to win in order to overtake Montpellier, which they achieved with a 1–0 win courtesy of a goal in the 88th minute.[2] Paris made its debut in the UEFA Women's Champions League in the following season.

== Teams ==
=== Changes in 2009–10 ===
Location of teams in 2010–11 Division 1 Féminine

On 2 May 2010, the women's sections of football clubs Rodez and Le Mans won their respective group to achieve promotion to the Division 1 Féminine. Rodez earned promotion following a 1–1 draw with AS Muret, who were in second place. Le Mans earned promotion after defeating ES Blanquefort 2–1.

Montigny-le-Bretonneux were the first club to suffer relegation to the second division, faltering with two games remaining in league play. On the final day of the league season, Soyaux became the second and final club to fall following its 2–0 loss to Montpellier.

Teams promoted to Division 1 Féminine

- Le Mans
- Rodez

Teams relegated to Division 2 Féminine

- Soyaux
- Montigny-le-Bretonneux

=== Stadia and locations ===
| Club | Location | Venue | Capacity |
|---|---|---|---|
| Hénin-Beaumont | Hénin-Beaumont | Stade Octave Birembaut | 3,000 |
| Juvisy | Viry-Châtillon | Stade Georges Maquin | 2,000 |
| La Roche ESOF | La Roche-sur-Yon | Stade de Saint-André d'Ornay | 1,800 |
| Le Mans | Le Mans | Stade Annexe Léon-Bollée | 4,000 |
| Lyon | Lyon | Plaine des Jeux de Gerland | 2,500 |
| Montpellier | Villeneuve-lès-Maguelone | Stade Joseph Blanc | 1,000 |
| Nord Allier Yzeure | Yzeure | Stade de Bellevue | 2,135 |
| Paris Saint-Germain | Paris | Stade Georges Lefèvre | 3,500 |
| Rodez | Rodez | Stade de Vabre | 400 |
| Saint-Étienne | Saint-Étienne | Stade Léon Nautin | 1,000 |
| Stade Briochin | Saint-Brieuc | Stade Fred Aubert | 13,500 |
| Toulouse | Toulouse | Stade de la Ramée | 3,000 |

=== Personnel and kits ===
| Team | Manager^{1} | Captain^{1} | Kit Manufacturer^{1} | Shirt Sponsor^{1} |
|---|---|---|---|---|
| Hénin-Beaumont | (France) Philippe Piette | (France) Gwendoline Rossi | Adidas | |
| Juvisy | (France) Sandrine Mathivet | (France) Sandrine Soubeyrand | Errea | |
| La Roche ESOF | (France) Malika Bousseau | (France) Coraline Roul | | |
| Le Mans | (France) Xavier Aubert | (France) Murielle Pannier | Kappa | LOUÉ |
| Lyon | (France) Patrice Lair | (France) Laura Georges | Adidas | BetClic |
| Montpellier | (France) Sarah M'Barek | (France) Hoda Lattaf | Nike | Groupe Nicollin |
| Nord Allier Yzeure | (France) Johnny Kari | (France) Faustine Roux | Adidas | |
| Paris Saint-Germain | (France) Camille Vaz | (France) Sabrina Delannoy | Nike | Emirates |
| Rodez | (France) Franck Plenecassagne | (France) Agathe Calvié | Duarig | |
| Saint-Étienne | (France) Hervé Didier | (Algeria) Safia Bengueddoudj | Adidas | Fruité |
| Stade Briochin | (France) Adolphe Ogouyon | (France) Audrey Février | Adidas | |
| Toulouse | (France) Matthieu Vrilliard | (France) Virginie Dessalle | Airness | IDEC |

^{1} Subject to change during the season.

=== Managerial changes ===
| Team | Outgoing manager | Manner of departure | Date of vacancy | Table | Incoming manager | Date of appointment | Table |
|---|---|---|---|---|---|---|---|
| Lyon | (France) Farid Benstiti | Mutual consent | 16 June 2010 | Off-season | (France) Patrice Lair | 18 June 2010 | Off-season |
| Stade Briochin | (France) Sonia Haziraj | Resigned | 15 July 2010 | Off-season | (France) Adolphe Ogouyon | 29 July 2010 | Off-season |

== League table ==
Note: A win in D1 Féminine is worth 4 points, with 2 points for a draw and 1 for a defeat.

| Pos | Team | Pld | W | D | L | GF | GA | GD | Pts | Qualification or relegation |
|---|---|---|---|---|---|---|---|---|---|---|
| 1 | Lyon (C, Q) | 22 | 22 | 0 | 0 | 106 | 6 | +100 | 88 | Qualification for Women's Champions League |
| 2 | Paris Saint-Germain (Q) | 22 | 17 | 1 | 4 | 43 | 16 | +27 | 74 | Qualification for Women's Champions League |
| 3 | Montpellier | 22 | 16 | 1 | 5 | 54 | 13 | +41 | 71 | |
| 4 | Juvisy | 22 | 15 | 3 | 4 | 62 | 30 | +32 | 70 | |
| 5 | Saint-Étienne | 22 | 11 | 1 | 10 | 25 | 27 | −2 | 56 | |
| 6 | Hénin-Beaumont | 22 | 8 | 2 | 12 | 19 | 37 | −18 | 48 | |
| 7 | Rodez | 22 | 6 | 5 | 11 | 19 | 29 | −10 | 45 | |
| 8 | Stade Briochin | 22 | 5 | 5 | 12 | 17 | 35 | −18 | 42 | |
| 9 | Yzeure | 22 | 4 | 5 | 13 | 26 | 57 | −31 | 39 | |
| 10 | Le Mans (R) | 22 | 4 | 5 | 13 | 17 | 51 | −34 | 39 | Relegation to Division 2 Féminine |
| 11 | Toulouse (R) | 22 | 4 | 4 | 14 | 19 | 50 | −31 | 38 | Relegation to Division 2 Féminine |
| 12 | La Roche-sur-Yon (R) | 22 | 3 | 2 | 17 | 15 | 71 | −56 | 33 | Relegation to Division 2 Féminine |

Source: French Football Federation
Rules for classification: 1st points; 2nd head-to-head goal difference; 3rd total goal difference
(C) Champions; (Q) Qualified for the phase indicated; (R) Relegated

== Results ==
| Home \ Away | HEB | JUV | LRO | MFC | LYO | MON | YZE | PSG | ROD | SET | STB | TOU |
|---|---|---|---|---|---|---|---|---|---|---|---|---|
| Hénin-Beaumont | | 1–2 | 4–1 | 2–1 | 0–1 | 0–3 | 0–2 | 0–4 | 0–1 | 1–0 | 2–1 | 1–0 |
| Juvisy | 1–1 | | 7–1 | 5–0 | 1–3 | 3–1 | 6–0 | 0–0 | 4–0 | 2–1 | 1–0 | 4–2 |
| La Roche-sur-Yon | 1–0 | 2–3 | | 1–2 | 0–4 | 0–4 | 2–1 | 1–6 | 0–2 | 0–1 | 2–1 | 1–1 |
| Le Mans | 1–2 | 1–2 | 2–1 | | 0–4 | 0–5 | 2–2 | 1–2 | 2–1 | 0–3 | 1–2 | 0–0 |
| Lyon | 7–0 | 7–1 | 10–0 | 9–0 | | 1–0 | 13–0 | 3–0 | 1–0 | 8–0 | 3–0 | 6–0 |
| Montpellier | 4–0 | 1–0 | 6–0 | 3–0 | 0–1 | | 3–1 | 3–1 | 2–1 | 0–1 | 5–0 | 5–1 |
| Yzeure | 0–3 | 3–3 | 2–2 | 3–0 | 0–5 | 2–2 | | 0–1 | 1–2 | 1–0 | 0–2 | 2–3 |
| Paris Saint-Germain | 1–2 | 3–1 | 2–0 | 2–1 | 1–2 | 1–0 | 2–1 | | 3–0 | 1–0 | 3–0 | 1–0 |
| Rodez | 2–0 | 2–4 | 2–0 | 0–0 | 1–3 | 0–2 | 1–1 | 0–1 | | 2–1 | 0–0 | 0–0 |
| Saint-Étienne | 3–0 | 1–3 | 4–0 | 0–0 | 0–6 | 0–1 | 2–0 | 0–1 | 1–0 | | 2–0 | 3–1 |
| Stade Briochin | 0–0 | 0–3 | 4–0 | 1–1 | 1–4 | 0–1 | 2–1 | 0–3 | 1–1 | 0–1 | | 1–1 |
| Toulouse | 1–0 | 0–6 | 3–0 | 1–2 | 1–5 | 0–3 | 1–3 | 1–4 | 2–1 | 0–1 | 0–1 | |

Updated to match(es) played on 31 May 2011. Source: French Football Federation
Legend: Blue = home team win; Yellow = draw; Red = away team win.

== Season statistics ==
Tonazzi was the topscorer award.

=== Top scorers ===
| Rank | Scorer | Club | Goals |
|---|---|---|---|
| 1 | (France) Laëtitia Tonazzi | Juvisy | 20 |
| 2 | (France) Sandrine Brétigny | Lyon | 19 |
| 3 | (France) Eugénie Le Sommer | Lyon | 17 |
| 4 | (France) Marie-Laure Delie | Montpellier | 14 |
| | (France) Louisa Necib | Lyon | 14 |

== Awards ==
=== Player of the Year ===
For the second consecutive season, the French Football Federation awarded a trophy to the best player of the Division 1 Féminine. The award was based on a points system with each manager of each club in the league voting for two players not on their team following each match day. Depending on their selection, the two players voted by each manager are given points of either three or one. During the season, the points were added up every week and, following the season, the player with the most points was awarded the honour. The previous winner of the award was Lyon midfielder Eugénie Le Sommer, who won the award while playing for Stade Briochin. On 5 May 2011, Paris Saint-Germain midfielder Élise Bussaglia was given the Division 1 Féminine Best Player award for her performances during the season. Bussaglia appeared in 20 matches, scored ten goals, and issued four assists.

| Rank | Name | Position | Team | Points | Matches Played | Goals | Assists |
|---|---|---|---|---|---|---|---|
| 1 | (France) **Élise Bussaglia** | **MF** | **Paris SG** | 40 | 20 | 10 | 4 |
| 2 | (France) Julie Morel | MF | Stade Briochin | 31 | 20 | 3 | 1 |
| 3 | (France) Cynthia Gueheo-Djetou | MF | Nord Allier | 29 | 20 | 6 | 2 |
| 4 | (France) Claire Guillard | FW | La Roche-sur-Yon | 25 | 13 | 4 | 0 |
| 4 | (France) Rose Lavaud | FW | Toulouse | 25 | 20 | 2 | 0 |
| 6 | (France) Gaëtane Thiney | MF | Juvisy | 24 | 20 | 11 | 3 |
| 6 | (France) Kenza Dali | MF | Rodez | 24 | 20 | 1 | 4 |
| 8 | (France) Claire Lavogez | FW | Hénin-Beaumont | 22 | 16 | 3 | 0 |
| 9 | (France) Marie-Laure Delie | FW | Montpellier | 21 | 20 | 12 | 4 |
| 10 | (France) Hoda Lattaf | FW | Montpellier | 20 | 20 | 10 | 5 |

Last updated: 9 May 2011
Source: Best Player Standings

=== UNFP Women's Player of the Year ===
The nominees for the UNFP Women's Player of the Year in the Division 1 Féminine. The winner was determined at the annual UNFP Awards, which was held on 22 May. The winner is displayed in bold.

| Player | Nationality | Club |
|---|---|---|
| Camille Abily | France | Lyon |
| **Élise Bussaglia** | France | Paris Saint-Germain |
| Shirley Cruz Traña | Costa Rica | Lyon |
| Lara Dickenmann | Switzerland | Lyon |

== Notable transfers ==
The summer transfer window for the 2010–11 Division 1 Féminine includes a host of transfers by French internationals and youth internationals. On 30 June, midfielder Eugénie Le Sommer confirmed that she would be departing her club, Stade Briochin, to join the defending champions Lyon. The following day, centre back Sabrina Viguier did the same joining Lyon on a fédéral contract. On 9 July, fellow international defender Ophélie Meilleroux joined Montpellier from Nord Allier Yzeure.

During the same offseason, Paris Saint-Germain recruited three youth internationals to the club, signing Léa Rubio and Charlotte Lozè from Montpellier and under-19 star Léa Le Garrec from relegated club Montigny-le-Bretonneux. Montpellier later nullified the departures of Rubio and Lozè by signing under-20 team captain Kelly Gadéa and under-20 team member Charlotte Bilbault.

On 5 July, Saint-Étienne confirmed that the club had signed Swiss international Muriel Bouakaz to a contract. Bouakaz had previously played with Zürich in the Nationalliga A. On 9 July, Montpellier announced the addition of Japanese international Rumi Utsugi to the team. Utsugi joins the club from NTV Beleza.
