= Camille Abily =

French footballer and manager (born 1984)

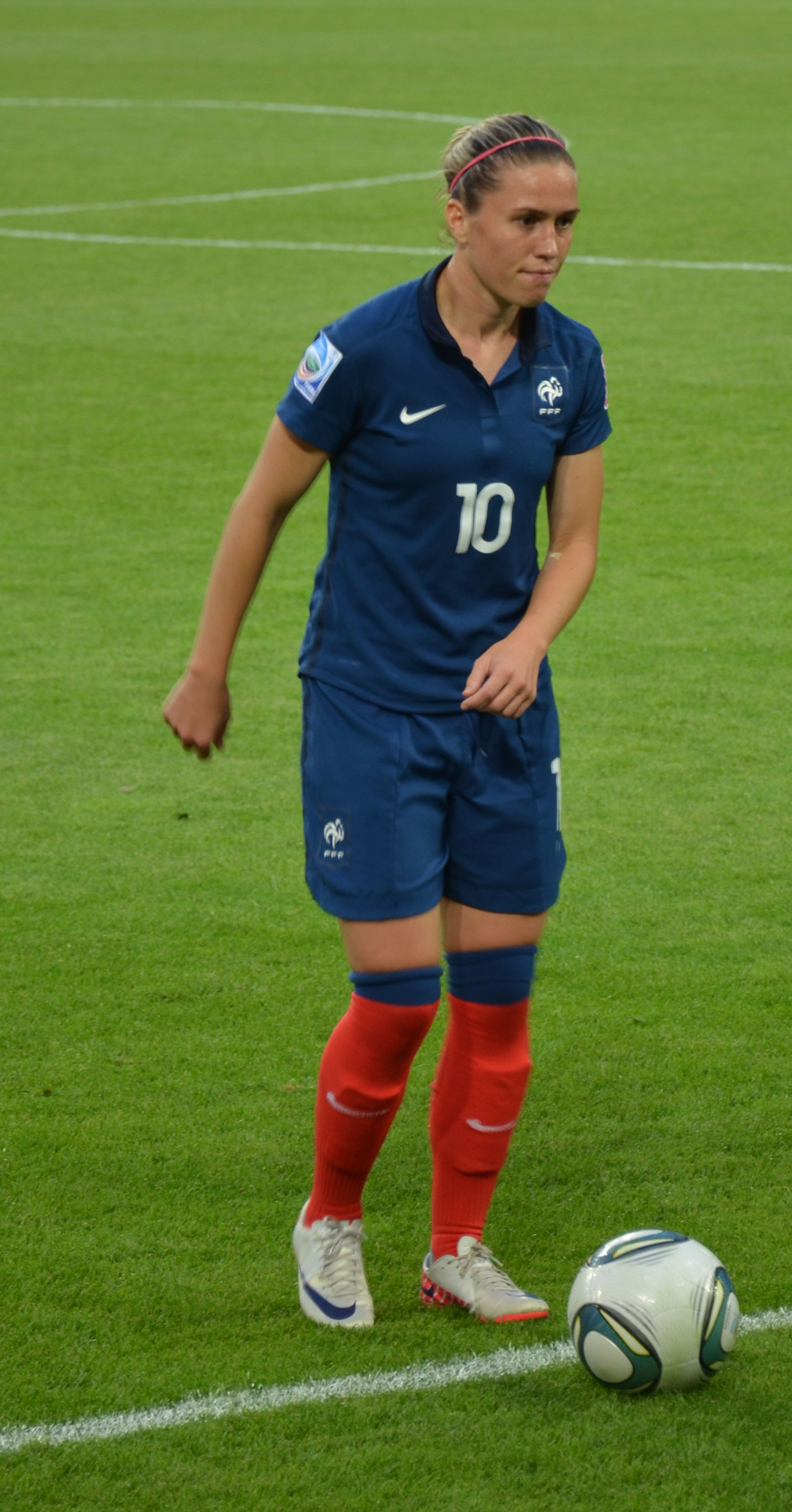
- Abily with France in 2011

Personal information
- Full name: Camille Anne Françoise Abily
- Date of birth: 5 December 1984 (age 41)
- Place of birth: Rennes, France
- Height: 1.68 m (5 ft 6 in)
- Position: Midfielder

Team information
- Current team: Chelsea (assistant)

Youth career
- 1992–1994: Jeanne d'Arc Bruz
- 1994–1999: FC Bruz
- 1999–2000: SC Le Rheu
- 2001–2005: CNFE Clairefontaine

Senior career*
Years	Team	Apps	(Gls)
2000–2001	Stade Briochin	20	(4)
2001–2002	La Roche-sur-Yon	21	(3)
2003–2006	Montpellier	68	(17)
2006–2009	Lyon	56	(34)
2009–2010	Los Angeles Sol	18	(8)
2009–2010	→ Paris Saint-Germain (loan)	13	(12)
2010	FC Gold Pride	17	(1)
2010–2018	Lyon	222	(144)
Total		452	(228)

International career
2000–2001	France U18	4	(0)
2001–2002	France U19	5	(0)
2001–2017	France	183	(37)

Managerial career
- 2019–2024: Lyon Féminin (assistant)
- 2024–: Chelsea (assistant)
- * Club domestic league appearances and goals

Camille Anne Françoise Abily (born 5 December 1984) is a French football manager and former player, who is currently the assistant manager of Chelsea F.C. Women. Abily played primarily as a midfielder. During her playing career, Abily featured prominently for both the France women's national team and for Lyon in the Division 1 Féminine. She also played for French teams Stade Briochin, La Roche-sur-Yon, CNFE Clairefontaine, Montpellier, and Paris Saint-Germain, and the Los Angeles Sol and FC Gold Pride in the United States. She has numerous titles, having won the Women's Professional Soccer Championship and numerous Division 1 Féminine league, Coupe de France Féminine, and UEFA Women's Champions League titles. With Lyon, she achieved a continental treble on four occasions, and a total of five Champions League titles.

Abily began her senior career in 2000, joining Stade Briochin. Following stints in a number of French clubs, including league-title winning seasons with Montpellier and Lyon, Abily joined the newly-formed Women's Professional Soccer league. She returned to the French league in 2010, re-joining Lyon where she made 222 league appearances in the final eight years of her professional career.

For France, Abily earned 183 caps and competed in three Euros, two World Cups, and two Olympic Games.

== Early life ==
Camille Anne Françoise Abily was born on 5 December 1984 in Rennes, a city in the region of Brittany, France. She has a sister, Hélène, who is a nurse, and an older brother, Julien.

== Youth career ==
Abily began her football career in 1992 when she was six. Her older brother played for FC Bruz and Abily, brought along to watch him play, was asked to train with the boys team after being spotted on the sidelines. Across her youth career, she played for Jeanne d'Arc Bruz, FC Bruz, and SC Le Rheu.

=== CNFE Clairefontaine, 2001–05 ===
Between 2001 and 2005, Abily attended the Clairefontaine academy. A member of the girl's residential programme, she completed her academic studies at a nearby high school while training at the academy.

== Club career ==
=== Early career, 2000–03 ===
Abily began her professional career in France's first division, playing for Stade Briochin and La Roche-sur-Yon.

=== Montpellier, 2003–06 ===
After her stint at Clairefontaine, Abily signed with Montpellier. With Montpellier, Abily won two Division 1 Féminine league titles in 2004 and 2005, as well as one Challenge de France cup.

=== Lyon, 2006–09 ===
After three seasons with Montpellier, Abily joined Lyon. With the team, she won several titles, including three consecutive titles league from 2006 to 2009. She was selected as the UNFP Female Player of the Year in 2006 and 2007.

=== Los Angeles Sol, 2009–10 ===
In 2008, Abily was selected by the Los Angeles Sol in the 2008 WPS International Draft, and, in March 2009, joined the new United States–based Women's Professional Soccer league. General manager Charlie Naimo sought to bring Abily to the Sol having seen a video of her play. She made her debut in the league's inaugural match against the Washington Freedom, and scored the second goal in the Sol's 2–0 victory. The Sol topped the regular-season league table, but were defeated by Sky Blue FC in the Championship final. Abily was the second highest goalscorer in the 2009 league season, scoring eight times to Sol teammate Marta's nine.

==== Loan to Paris Saint-Germain, 2009–10 ====
Following the conclusion of the 2009 Women's Professional Soccer season, Abily returned to France where she played for Paris Saint-Germain on loan.

=== FC Gold Pride, 2010 ===
Abily was traded to FC Gold Pride in exchange for Tina DiMartino and the 14th pick in the 2010 draft. Of Abily's trade, FC Gold Pride's general manager, Ilisa Kessler, said she ‘‘[couldn't] remember’’ what was traded in return for Abily: “I didn’t care. I just wanted Abily.’’ Abily played in 17 games for the Pride, scoring one goal and providing six assists. On 26 September 2010, Abily won the Women's Professional Soccer Championship with FC Gold Pride. On 27 September 2010, Abily's contract with the Gold Pride was mutually terminated as she decided to return to Lyon and focus on the upcoming 2011 Women's World Cup. 51 days after lifting the title, FC Gold Pride ceased operations.

=== Return to Lyon, 2010–18 ===
==== 2010–11 ====
In 2010, Abily announced that she would be returning to Lyon for the 2010–11 season. She won her fourth Division 1 Féminine title, and second with Lyon. On 26 May 2011, she was a part of the Lyon team that won their first Champions League title. Abily was named Player of the Match in the final. She was nominated for the UNFP Women's Player of the Year.

==== 2011–12 ====
With Lyon, Abily retained the D1 league title, scoring 15 goals across the league season. On 13 May 2012, Lyon defeated Montpellier 2–1 to lift the Coupe de France Féminine. In the Champions League final, Abily scored the second of Lyon's goals as they triumphed over Frankfurt, and was named the final's Player of the Match for a consecutive season. She was the joint-top goalscorer of the 2011–12 Champions League season (alongside Lyon teammate Eugénie Le Sommer), scoring nine goals. Having achieved the domestic league, cup, and Champions League titles, Abily earned her first continental treble.

==== 2012–15: Domestic success, continental struggle ====
In the 2012–13 Champions League, Lyon were runners-up following defeat to Wolfsburg. In the 2013–14 season, Abily achieved her seventh league title, and fourth Coupe de France Féminine. She repeated the domestic double in the 2014–15 season.

==== 2015–16 ====
In the 2015–16 season, Abily lifted the Division 1 Féminine and Coupe de France Féminine titles. On 26 May 2016, Abily lifted her third Champions League trophy with Lyon. She was named to the Champions League Squad of the Season.

==== 2016–17 ====
In December 2016, Abily announced that she would retired from competitive play—both internationally and at club level—following the 2017 Euro. However, in May 2017, she signed a one-year contract extension with Lyon to complete a final season with the club. On 1 June 2017, Abily secured her fourth Champions League title following a penalty shoot-out win over domestic rivals Paris Saint-Germain; Abily was Lyon's sixth penalty taker, and successfully scored past Katarzyna Kiedrzynek.

==== 2017–18 ====
After spending eight seasons at Lyon during her second stint, Abily retired from competitive play in June 2018. She scored in her final match, the 2018 Champions League final, with Lyon beating Wolfsburg 4–1 in extra time. Following Lyon's 2018 Champions League victory, Abily became one of four Lyon players to hold the record for the most titles (five); she also became the all-time competition appearance maker with 81—overtaking Emma Byrne's previous record of 77—and broke the record for the most Champions League goals for a single club (43). Abily achieved 23 titles with Lyon, and made a club-record 326 appearances. She has been described by Lyon as ‘‘one of [the club's] greatest legends,’’ and as having left an ‘‘indelible mark’’ on the club.

== International career ==
=== Youth: –2001 ===
Prior to playing for the senior team, Abily played at youth level representing France's under-18 team at the 2001 Women's Under-18 Euro.

=== Senior: 2001–17 ===
==== 2001–05: Senior and major tournament debut ====
On 26 September 2001, Abily—age 16—made her senior debut for France during a friendly match against the Netherlands. Her major international tournament debut came at the 2005 Euro, where France were eliminated in the group stage.

==== 2007–09: Debut goal and 2009 Euro ====
Abily's debut senior international goal came on 28 February 2007, as France secured a 2–0 win over China PR. On 11 April 2007, Abily scored a hat-trick in France's 6–0 2009 Euro qualifying victory over Greece. She scored again in qualifying wins over Serbia and Slovenia. Abily represented France at the 2009 Euro. Abily scored twice in the competition's group stage: an 18th-minute penalty in France's opening match against Iceland, and the equaliser in a 1–1 draw to Norway. In the quarter-finals, France were eliminated by the Netherlands following a 5–4 penalty shootout loss.

==== 2010–11: 2011 World Cup ====
During qualification for the 2011 World Cup, Abily scored five times, including during France's 12–0 win over Estonia. On 6 June 2011, Abily was named to France's tournament squad for the World Cup. France proceeded to their first-ever semi-final appearance at a Women's World Cup after beating England 4–3 in a penalty shootout. Abily, France's first penalty taker, had her shot saved by Karen Bardsley. France were defeated in the semi-final by eventual runners up, the United States. In the third place play-off, France lost 2–1 to Sweden.

==== 2011–12: 2012 Olympic Games ====
As one of the top two UEFA teams at the 2011 World Cup, France qualified for the 2012 Summer Olympics in London. In May 2012, Abily was named to France's squad for the tournament. On 6 August 2012, France were defeated 2–1 by Japan in the semi-finals. Despite a ‘‘dominating’’ performance from France, they lost out on the bronze medal to Canada following an injury time goal by Diana Matheson.

==== 2013–15: Cyprus Cup and 2015 World Cup ====
On 12 March 2014, Abily scored in France's 2–0 victory over England to win the 2014 Cyprus Cup. It marked the fifteenth meeting of the two countries since England had last produced a victory over France in 1974. In October 2014, during a 2–0 friendly win over Germany, Abily suffered a sprain to her medial collateral ligament.

On 23 April 2015, Abily was named to France's squad for the 2015 Women's World Cup. In the team's opening match, a 1–0 win over England in Moncton, Abily was not punished after elbowing England's Laura Bassett in the face. England's head coach, Mark Sampson, believed the incident to have been worthy of Abily receiving a red card, saying: “If you see Laura Bassett walk out of the stadium or see pictures of her you’ll see what the decision should have been.’’ The incident was not reviewed by FIFA's disciplinary committee, and Abily did not receive retrospective punishment. England did not contest the decision to review the incident or lodge a formal complaint with FIFA. Basset said the incident was ‘‘out of [her] control’’, emphasising that England's Football Association ‘‘have to do what they deem best’’ in regards to challenging incidents. Later in the tournament, Ugo Njoku of Nigeria was handed a three-match ban by the disciplinary committee for elbowing Australia's Sam Kerr. France were ultimately eliminated in the quarter-finals following a penalty shoot-out defeat to Germany. Abily shared her frustrations with the two teams being drawn against each other early in the competition, and the differences in seeding methods compared to the men's tournament, telling French sport newspaper L'Équipe ‘‘At some point they have to stop taking us for idiots ...’’ [À un moment, il faut qu’ils arrêtent de nous prendre pour des cons…] Despite their early exit, France qualified for the 2016 Summer Olympics as one of the three UEFA teams (aside from England) to progress the furthest at the World Cup.

==== 2016–17: 2016 Olympic Games, 2017 SheBelieves, 2017 Euro, and international retirement ====
Abily again represented France at the 2016 Summer Olympics in Rio. The team were eliminated in the quarter-finals following a 1–0 defeat to Canada.

In March 2017, Abily was a member of the France squad who defeated World Cup title-holders, the United States, to win the 2017 SheBelieves Cup. Abily scored a brace in the team's 3–0 victory, handing the USA their worst defeat since 2007.

At the 2017 Euro, France qualified for the knockout stage second in their group, being held to draws by both Austria and Switzerland. In the final group stage game, following the ejection of Ève Périsset on a red card, it was Abily who scored France's late equaliser in their 1–1 draw to Switzerland. Drawn against England, France were eliminated in the quarter-finals; it was England's first victory over Les Bleues in 43 years. The match marked Abily's final performance for France as she retired from international play in July 2017, citing a desire to spend more time with her daughter and the psychological stress of international tournament cycles. Upon her retirement, England manager Sampson described Abily as a ‘‘football legend’’ who ‘‘[didn't] deserve to end her international career with a defeat.’’ Abily described his sentiments as ‘‘nice to hear, but [...] a little over the top.’’

Across a senior career spanning more than 15 years, Abily earned 183 caps for France, and scored 37 goals. As of September 2026, she is the fifth most capped player for France's women's national team.

== Managerial career ==
From 2019 until 2024, Abily worked as assistant manager for Olympique Lyonnais Féminin.

On 1 July 2024, she was appointed as assistant manager of Chelsea.

== Personal life ==
In February 2025, Abily and former France and Lyon teammate Sonia Bompastor announced that they had been in a relationship for 13 years. They have four children together, born between 2015 and 2021, including twins born in 2017. As of July 2024, the pair have coached Chelsea together, with Abily acting as Bompastor's assistant coach. Of their working relationship, Abily has stated that they ‘‘don’t work together because [they] are a couple’’ but ‘‘because [they] complement each other.’’

== Career statistics ==
=== Club ===
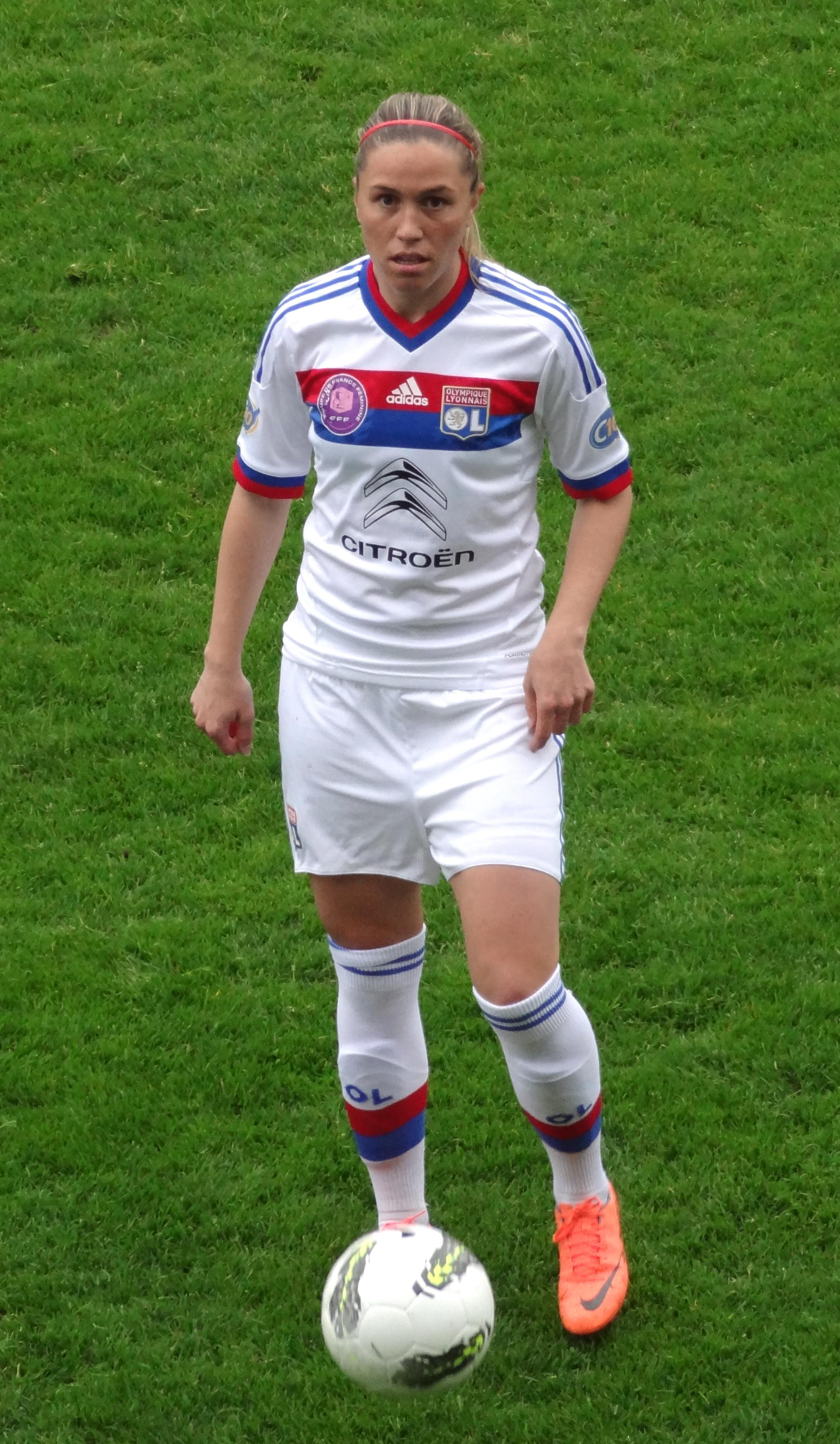
Abily with Lyon in 2012

Statistics accurate as of 1 September 2016

Club	Season	League		Cup		Continental		Total	
Club	Season	Apps	Goals	Apps	Goals	Apps	Goals	Apps	Goals
Stade Briochin	2000–01	20	4	–	–	–	–	20	4
Stade Briochin	Total	20	4	–	–	–	–	20	4
La Roche-sur-Yon	2001–02	21	3	–	–	–	–	21	3
La Roche-sur-Yon	Total	21	3	–	–	–	–	21	3
CNFE Clairefontaine	2002–03	17	5	–	–	–	–	17	5
CNFE Clairefontaine	Total	17	5	–	–	–	–	17	5
Montpellier	2003–04	22+3	4+0	0	0	0	0	25	4
Montpellier	2004–05	22	9	3	1	5	0	30	10
Montpellier	2005–06	21	4	5	3	9	0	35	7
Montpellier	Total	68	17	8	4	14	0	90	21
Lyon	2006–07	22	17	4	3	0	0	26	20
Lyon	2007–08	21	8	4	1	9	5	34	14
Lyon	2008–09	13	9	0	0	5	5	18	14
Lyon	Total	56	34	8	4	14	10	78	48
Los Angeles Sol	2009	18	8	–	–	–	–	18	8
Los Angeles Sol	Total	18	8	–	–	–	–	18	8
Paris SG	2009–10	13	12	0	0	0	0	13	12
Paris SG	Total	13	12	0	0	0	0	13	12
FC Gold Pride	2010	17	1	–	–	–	–	17	1
FC Gold Pride	Total	17	1	–	–	–	–	17	1
Lyon	2010–11	19	12	3	0	7	1	29	13
Lyon	2011–12	22	15	5	3	8	9	35	27
Lyon	2012–13	21	20	4	6	9	5	34	31
Lyon	2013–14	19	13	6	4	2	1	27	18
Lyon	2014–15	19	12	6	5	2	3	27	20
Lyon	2015–16	19	10	4	3	8	3	31	16
Lyon	2016–17	19	6	2	0	9	5	30	15
Lyon	2017–18	21	9	5	6	8	6	34	21
Lyon	Total	158	97	35	27	53	33	247	161
Career total		388	181	51	35	81	43	521	263

=== International ===
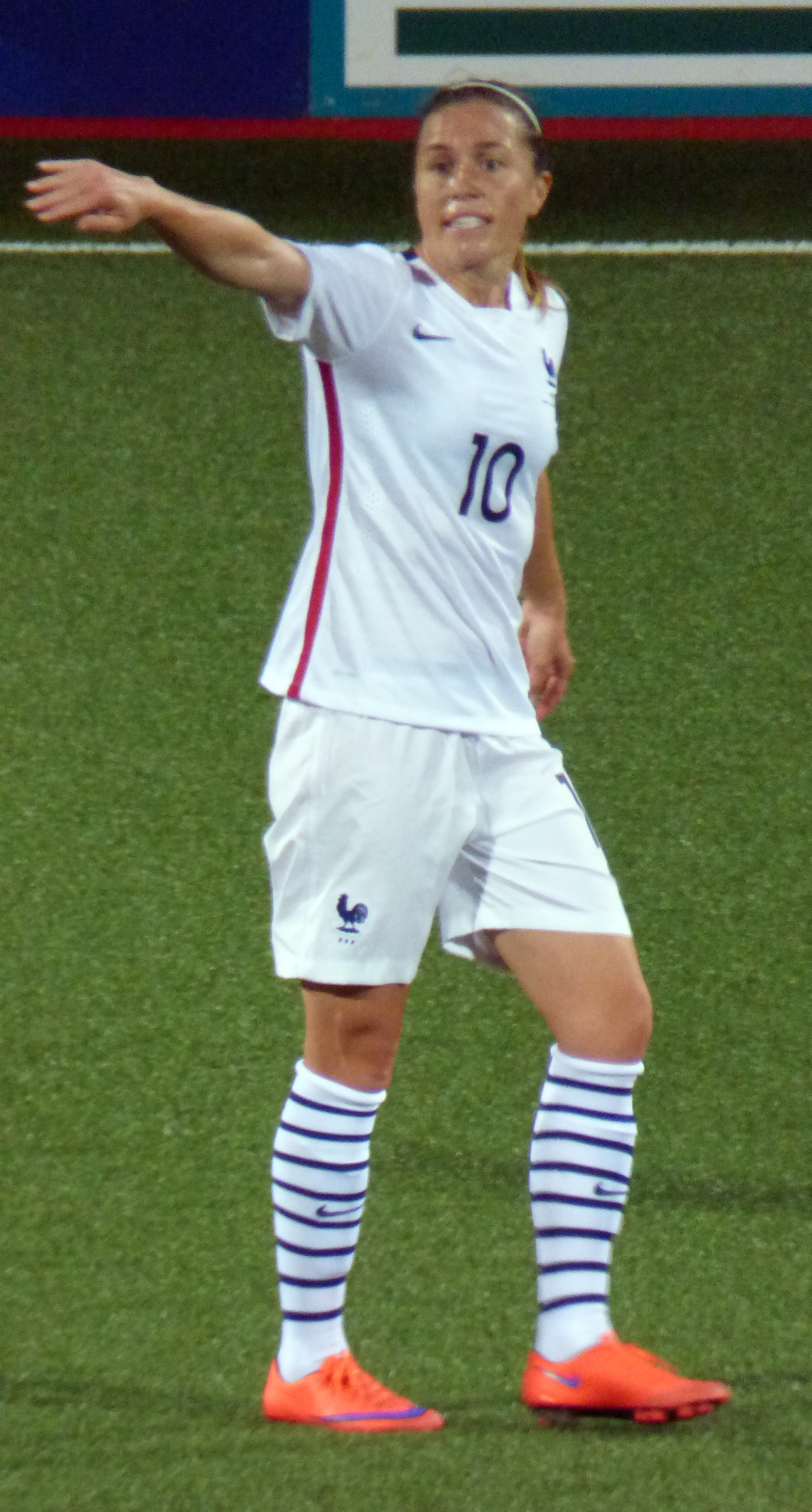
Camille Abily playing for France in May 2015

(Correct as of 1 September 2016)

National team	Season	Apps	Goals
France	2001–02	2	0
France	2002–03	0	0
France	2003–04	0	0
France	2004–05	11	0
France	2005–06	13	0
France	2006–07	13	6
France	2007–08	7	2
France	2008–09	4	1
France	2009–10	13	6
France	2010–11	14	5
France	2011–12	18	3
France	2012–13	20	0
France	2013–14	20	5
France	2014–15	16	1
France	2015–16	13	2
France	2016–17	6	2
Total		170	33

==== International goals ====
#	Date	Venue	Opponent	Score	Result	Competition
1	28 February 2007	Stade Robert Brettes, Mérignac, France	China	2–0	2–0	Friendly
2	12 March 2007	Estadio Municipal, Lagos, Portugal	Norway	1–0	1–0	2007 Algarve Cup
3	11 April 2007	Stade Georges Pompidou, Valence, France	Greece	1–0	6–0	UEFA Women's Euro 2009 qualifying
4	11 April 2007	Stade Georges Pompidou, Valence, France	Greece	3–0	6–0	UEFA Women's Euro 2009 qualifying
5	11 April 2007	Stade Georges Pompidou, Valence, France	Greece	5–0	6–0	UEFA Women's Euro 2009 qualifying
6	30 May 2007	Stade Camille Lebon, Angoulême, France	Slovenia	2–0	6–0	UEFA Women's Euro 2009 qualifying
7	1 October 2007	Mitsubishi Forklift Stadion, Almere, Netherlands	Netherlands	0–1	1–4	Friendly
8	27 October 2007	Stadion Kralj Petar I, Belgrade, Serbia	Serbia	0–2	0–8	UEFA Women's Euro 2009 qualifying
9	22 April 2009	Stade Gaston Gérard, Dijon, France	Switzerland	1–0	2–0	Friendly
10	24 August 2009	Ratina Stadion, Tampere, Finland	Iceland	1–1	1–3	UEFA Women's Euro 2009
11	30 August 2009	Finnair Stadium, Helsinki, Finland	Norway	1–1	1–1	UEFA Women's Euro 2009
12	23 September 2009	Stadion NK Inter Zaprešić, Zaprešić, Croatia	Croatia	0–6	0–7	2011 FIFA Women's World Cup qualification
13	28 October 2009	Stade Jules Deschaseaux, Le Havre, France	Estonia	3–0	12–0	2011 FIFA Women's World Cup qualification
14	21 November 2009	Gradski Stadion, Inđija, Serbia	Serbia	0–2	0–2	2011 FIFA Women's World Cup qualification
15	31 March 2010	Windsor Park, Belfast, Northern Ireland	Northern Ireland	0–2	0–4	2011 FIFA Women's World Cup qualification
16	25 August 2010	Stade de l'Aube, Troyes, France	Serbia	6–0	7–0	2011 FIFA Women's World Cup qualification
17	2 March 2011	GSP Stadium, Nicosia, Cyprus	Switzerland	2–0	2–0	2011 Cyprus Cup
18	4 March 2011	Ammochostos Stadium, Larnaca, Cyprus	Netherlands	1–1	1–2	2011 Cyprus Cup
19	18 June 2011	Stade de l'Épopée, Calais, France	Belgium	2–0	7–0	Friendly
20	30 June 2011	Ruhrstadion, Bochum, Germany	Canada	3–0	4–0	2011 FIFA Women's World Cup
21	14 September 2011	Ness Ziona Stadium, Ness Ziona, Israel	Israel	2–0	5–0	UEFA Women's Euro 2013 qualifying
22	16 November 2011	Stade René Serge Nabajoth, Pointe-à-Pitre, Guadeloupe	Uruguay	6–0	8–0	Friendly
23	4 April 2012	Stade Michel d'Ornano, Caen, France	Wales	4–0	4–0	UEFA Women's Euro 2013 qualifying
24	28 November 2013	MMArena, Le Mans, France	Bulgaria	11–0	14–0	2015 FIFA Women's World Cup qualification
25	12 March 2014	GSP Stadium, Nicosia, Cyprus	England	0–2	0–2	2014 Cyprus Cup
26	5 April 2014	Stade Jean-Bouin, Angers, France	Kazakhstan	4–0	7–0	2015 FIFA Women's World Cup qualification
27	5 April 2014	Stade Jean-Bouin, Angers, France	Kazakhstan	5–0	7–0	2015 FIFA Women's World Cup qualification
28	7 May 2014	Stade Léo Lagrange, Besançon, France	Hungary	2–0	4–0	2015 FIFA Women's World Cup qualification
29	6 March 2015	Stadium Bela Vista, Parchal, Portugal	Denmark	2–0	4–1	2015 Algarve Cup
30	23 October 2015	Stade Jean-Bouin, Paris, France	Netherlands	1–2	1–2	Friendly
31	11 April 2016	Stade Nungesser, Valenciennes, France	Ukraine	2–0	4–0	UEFA Women's Euro 2017 qualifying
32	23 July 2016	Stade de l'Abbé-Deschamps, Auxerre, France	Canada	1–0	1–0	Friendly
33	3 August 2016	Mineirão, Belo Horizonte, Brazil	Colombia	3–0	4–0	2016 Olympics
34	7 March 2017	Robert F. Kennedy Memorial Stadium, Washington, United States	United States	0–1	0–3	2017 SheBelieves Cup
35	7 March 2017	Robert F. Kennedy Memorial Stadium, Washington, United States	United States	0–3	0–3	2017 SheBelieves Cup
36	11 July 2017	Stade Louis Dugauguez, Sedan, France	Norway	1–0	1–1	Friendly
36	26 July 2017	Rat Verlegh Stadion, Breda, Netherlands	Switzerland	1–1	1–1	UEFA Women's Euro 2017
Correct as of 20 June 2018

== Honours ==
Montpellier HSC

- Division 1 Féminine: 2004, 2005
- Coupe de France Féminine: 2006

FC Gold Pride

- Women's Professional Soccer Championship: 2010

Lyon

- Division 1 Féminine: 2007, 2008, 2009, 2011, 2012, 2013, 2014, 2015, 2016, 2017
- Coupe de France Féminine: 2008, 2012, 2013, 2014, 2015, 2016, 2017
- UEFA Women's Champions League: 2010–2011, 2011–2012, 2015–16, 2016–17, 2017–18

France

- Cyprus Cup: 2012, 2014
- SheBelieves Cup: 2017

Individual

- UNFP Female Player of the Year: 2006, 2007
- Women's Professional Soccer Player of the Month: June 2009
- Women's Professional Soccer All-Star: 2009
- UEFA Women's Champions League Top scorer: 2011–12 (9, joint with Eugénie Le Sommer)
- UEFA Women's Champions League Squad of the Season: 2015–16
- FIFA FIFPRO Women's World 11: 2017

=== Records ===
- All-time UEFA Women's Champions League appearance maker: 81 (24 May 2018 – 13 November 2019)
- Most UEFA Women's Champions League goals scored for a single club: 43 (24 May 2018 – 25 September 2019)
