= Sarah Bouhaddi =

French footballer (born 1986)

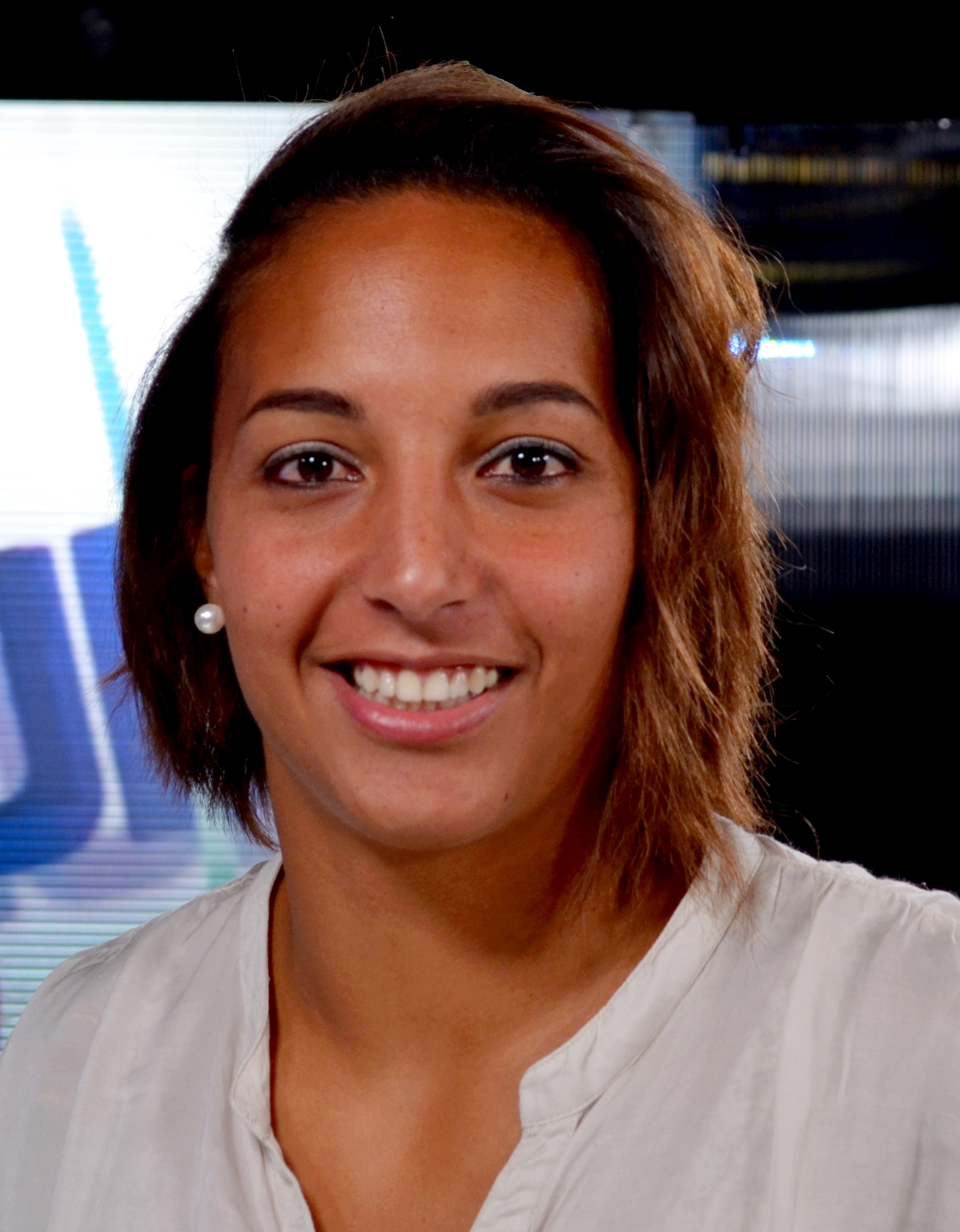
- Bouhaddi in 2014

Personal information
- Full name: Sarah Bouhaddi
- Date of birth: 17 October 1986 (age 40)
- Place of birth: Cannes, France
- Height: 1.75 m (5 ft 9 in)
- Position: Goalkeeper

Youth career
- 1994–1999: SC Mouans-Sartoux
- 1999–2001: FC Mougins
- 2001–2002: OS Monaco

Senior career*
Years	Team	Apps	(Gls)
2002–2005	CNFE Clairefontaine	51	(1)
2005–2006	Toulouse	22	(0)
2006–2009	Juvisy	46	(0)
2009–2022	Lyon	199	(1)
2021	→ OL Reign (loan)	19	(0)
2022–2023	Paris Saint-Germain	15	(0)
2024	Arsenal	0	(0)
2024–2025	Al-Ula	16	(0)

International career
2001–2002	France U17	9	(0)
2003–2005	France U19	36	(0)
2006	France U20	5	(0)
2004–2020	France	149	(0)
- * Club domestic league appearances and goals as of 23 November 2024

Sarah Bouhaddi (born 17 October 1986) is a French professional footballer who plays as a goalkeeper.

== Club career ==
After spending 13 seasons with Lyon, Bouhaddi joined Paris Saint-Germain on 16 September 2022 on a one-year deal.

After leaving Paris Saint-Germain a free agent, Bouhaddi joined Arsenal WFC on a short term contract on 30 January 2024.

In September 2024, Bouhaddi signed with Al-Ula FC in the Saudi Women's Premier League.

== International career ==
Bouhaddi is of Algerian descent. Born in France, she made her debut for the France national team in 2004. She represented her nation at the 2012 Summer Olympics, playing in all of France's matches, as they reached fourth place. Bouhaddi went on to become her country's all-time most capped goalkeeper. In 2020, she paused her international career.

== Career statistics ==
=== Club ===
As of 1 May 2021

Club	Season	League		National cup		Continental		Total	
Club	Season	Apps	Goals	Apps	Goals	Apps	Goals	Apps	Goals
CNFE Clairefontaine	2002–03	21	0	—		—		21	0
CNFE Clairefontaine	2003–04	17	0	—		—		17	0
CNFE Clairefontaine	Total	38	0	0	0	0	0	38	0
Toulouse	2005–06	22	0	—		—		22	0
Toulouse	Total	22	0	0	0	0	0	22	0
Juvisy	2006–07	18	0	—		1	0	19	0
Juvisy	2007–08	16	0	3	0	—		19	0
Juvisy	2008–09	12	0	3	0	—		15	0
Juvisy	Total	46	0	6	0	1	0	53	0
Lyon	2009–10	7	0	3	0	2	0	12	0
Lyon	2010–11	14	0	3	0	9	0	26	0
Lyon	2011–12	19	0	3	0	7	0	29	0
Lyon	2012–13	18	0	5	0	8	0	31	0
Lyon	2013–14	20	0	3	0	4	0	27	0
Lyon	2014–15	18	1	3	0	3	0	24	1
Lyon	2015–16	8	0	4	0	5	0	17	0
Lyon	2016–17	17	0	—		9	0	26	0
Lyon	2017–18	21	0	—		7	0	28	0
Lyon	2018–19	18	0	—		7	0	25	0
Lyon	2019–20	16	0	—		9	0	25	0
Lyon	2020–21	16	0	—		—		3	0
Lyon	Total	192	1	24	0	70	0	273	1
Career total		285	1	30	0	71	0	386	1

=== International ===
As of match played 4 March 2020

Appearances and goals by national team and year
National team	Year	Apps	Goals
France	2004	2	0
France	2005	7	0
France	2006	12	0
France	2007	9	0
France	2008	4	0
France	2009	9	0
France	2010	0	0
France	2011	1	0
France	2012	18	0
France	2013	12	0
France	2014	14	0
France	2015	11	0
France	2016	16	0
France	2017	11	0
France	2018	8	0
France	2019	14	0
France	2020	1	0
Total		149	0

== Honours ==
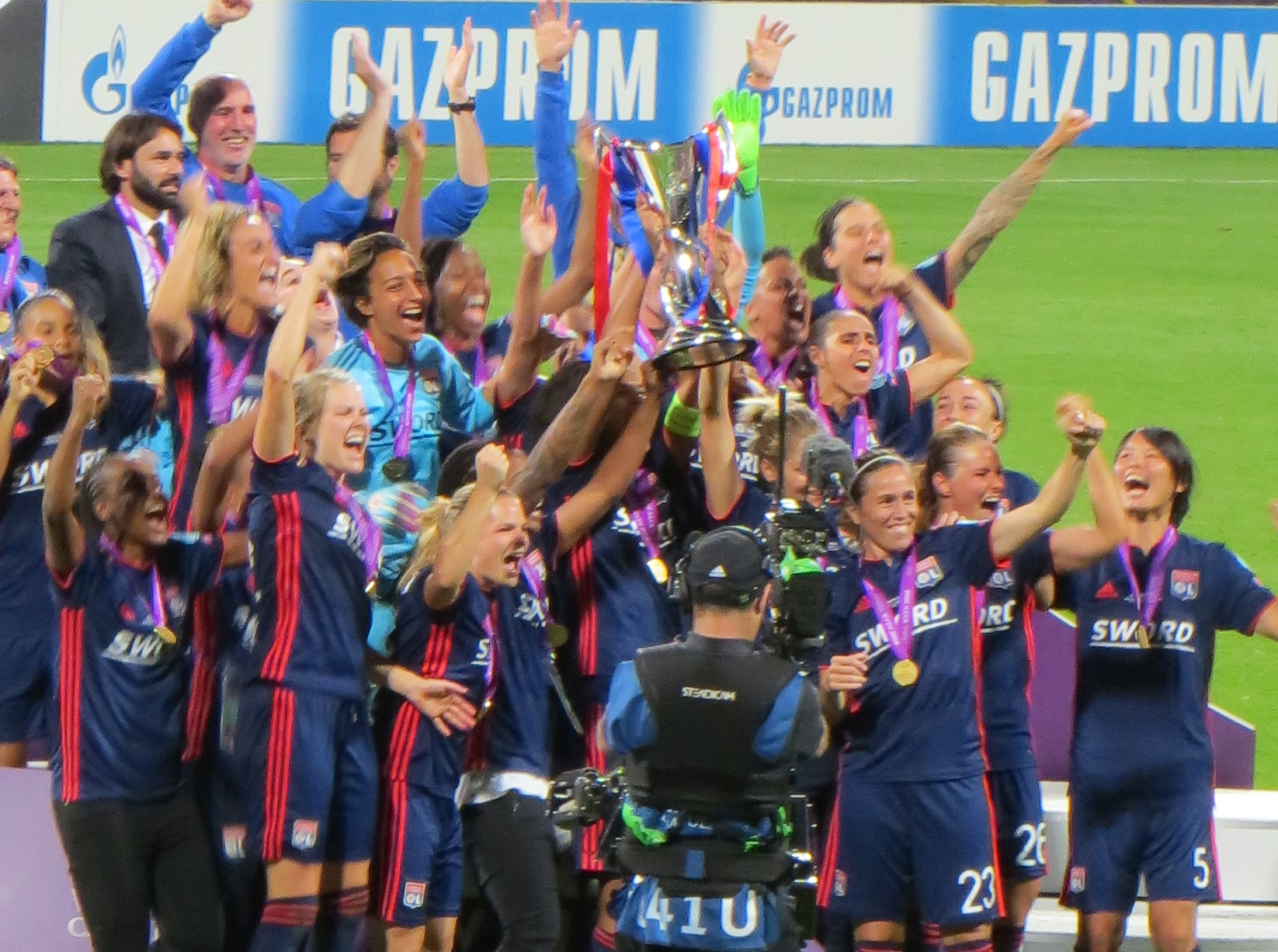
Bouhaddi (in light blue) celebrating with Lyon teammates after winning the 2018 UEFA Women's Champions League Final.

Lyon

- Division 1 Féminine (11): 2009–10, 2010–11, 2011–12, 2012–13, 2013–14, 2014–15, 2015–16, 2016–17, 2017–18, 2018–19, 2019–20
- Coupe de France Féminine (8): 2011–12, 2012–13, 2013–14, 2014–15, 2015–16, 2016–17, 2018–19, 2019–20
- UEFA Women's Champions League (8): 2010–11, 2011–12, 2015–16, 2016–17, 2017–18, 2018–19, 2019–20, 2021–22

France

- Cyprus Cup: 2012, 2014
- SheBelieves Cup: 2017

Individual

- IFFHS World's Best Woman Goalkeeper: 2016, 2017, 2018
- IFFHS Women's World Team: 2017, 2018, 2020
- UEFA Champions League Goalkeeper of the Season: 2019–20
- The Best FIFA Goalkeeper: 2020

== See also ==
- List of women's footballers with 100 or more international caps
