= Sabrina Viguier =

French footballer (born 1981)

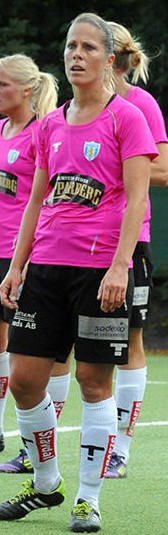
- Playing for Göteborg in 2014

Personal information
- Full name: Sabrina Marie-Christine Viguier
- Date of birth: 4 January 1981 (age 45)
- Place of birth: Rodez, France
- Height: 5 ft 7 in (1.70 m)
- Position: Centre back

Team information
- Current team: IF Limhamn Bunkeflo
- Number: 25

Youth career
- 1987–1998: US Laissac-Bertholène
- 1998–1999: FCF Lioujas-La Loubière
- 1999–2000: Toulouse FC

Senior career*
| Years | Team | Apps | (Gls) |
| 2000–2006 | Toulouse FC | 126 | (8) |
| 2006–2010 | Montpellier HSC | 81 | (5) |
| 2010–2014 | Olympique Lyonnais | 60 | (1) |
| 2014 | Kopparbergs/Göteborg FC | 20 | (0) |
| 2014–2016 | AS Saint-Étienne | 27 | (0) |
| 2016 | IF Limhamn Bunkeflo | 14 | (0) |

International career^{‡}
| 2000–2012 | France | 92 | (1) |
- * Club domestic league appearances and goals as of 14:50, 28 October 2015 (UTC) ‡ National team caps and goals as of 14:50, 28 October 2015 (UTC)

Sabrina Marie-Christine Viguier (born 4 January 1981 in Rodez) is a retired French football player. She played as a centre back and has played for the France women's national football team making her debut in 2000. She last played for IF Limhamn Bunkeflo of the Elitettan until she announced her retirement from football in 2017. She has won the UEFA Women's Champions League twice with Olympique Lyonnais in 2011 and 2012.

== Career ==
=== Early career at Toulouse FC ===
Viguier began her career at age six playing for US Laissac-Bertholène in her hometown commune of Bertholène. After an eight-year stint at the club, she joined FCF Lioujas-La Loubière in nearby La Loubière. Viguier later joined the biggest women's club in the Midi-Pyrénées département, Toulouse FC, known then as Toulouse OAC. After spending a year in the reserves, she joined the club during the 2000–01 as Toulouse were coming off its first league championship. Viguier became a regular in the squad that saw the team win three straight D1 Féminine titles, including winning the double during the 2002–03 season after capturing the Challenge de France. Toulouse also reached the semi-finals of the 2001–02 UEFA Women's Cup. Following the increase in competition from rivals Juvisy, Toulouse's stranglehold on the league came to an end and, following the 2005–06 season, Viguier moved to Montpellier HSC who had just completed back-to-back championship runs in 2004 and 2005.

=== Montpellier HSC ===
In her first season with the club, Viguier appeared in all 22 league matches scoring two goals helping the club win the 2006–07 Challenge de France. The 2008–09 season saw Viguier maintain her consistency appearing in 25 matches during the season and scoring two goals helping Montpellier capture another Challenge de France and finish the league in 2nd place. It gave Montpellier qualification to the newly created UEFA Women's Champions League. Viguier remained a starter in the 2009–10 season as Montpellier participated in three competitions. Domestically, she made 20 league appearances scoring two goals. In the Challenge de France, Viguier appeared in all five matches the team contested as Montpellier reached the final for the second consecutive season. The club was unable to defend its title though losing 5–0 to Paris Saint-Germain in 2010 Final. In the Champions League, Viguier appeared in all nine matches the team contested as Montpellier reached the quarterfinals losing to Swedish club Umeå. She scored her only goal in the competition in a 7–1 qualifying round win over Macedonian outfit Tikvesanka Kavadarci.

=== Olympique Lyonnais ===
On 1 July 2010, Olympique Lyonnais confirmed that it had signed Viguier from Montpellier. She made her club debut in the team's opening league match of the season against her former club Toulouse. Viguier featured regularly during the campaign starting in defense, usually as either a right back or central defender. She scored her first goal for the club on 13 March 2011 in a 3–0 win over Rodez in the Challenge de France. A week later, Viguier scored her first league goal in a 10–0 win over La-Roche-sur-Yon. She finished the campaign appearing in 29 total matches scoring two goals as Lyon won the league and the UEFA Women's Champions League. Viguier played 28 matches in total at the 2011–12 season, helping Lyon to achieve the treble by winning the league, the cup (beating her former team Montpellier at the final) and the UEFA Women's Champions League (defeating German team Frankfurt in the final).

=== Kopparbergs/Göteborg FC ===
On 31 March 2014, Viguier left Olympique Lyonnais to sign with Swedish team Kopparbergs/Göteborg FC of the Damallsvenskan. She played all 20 league matches of the season, helping Göteborg finish 3rd in the league.

=== AS Saint-Étienne ===
On 17 December 2014, with the French season already in progress, she decided to return to France signing with AS Saint-Étienne until the end of the season. In August 2015, Viguier extended her contract with Saint-Étienne for another year to play the 2015–16 season.

== International career ==
Viguier made her international debut on 18 November 2000 in a 3–0 victory over Greece. She has collected 92 caps since her debut with her only international goal coming 23 February 2003 in a 2–1 victory over the Netherlands. Viguier has participated in several international tournaments for her nation; beginning with UEFA Women's Euro 2001, the 2003 FIFA Women's World Cup, UEFA Women's Euro 2005, UEFA Women's Euro 2009, the 2011 FIFA Women's World Cup and the 2012 Olympics.

== Career statistics ==
=== Club ===
Statistics accurate as of 28 October 2015

| Club | Season | League | | Cup | | Continental | | Total | |
| Club | Season | Apps | Goals | Apps | Goals | Apps | Goals | Apps | Goals |
|---|---|---|---|---|---|---|---|---|---|
| Toulouse FC | 2000–01 | 17 | 0 | 0 | 0 | 0 | 0 | 17 | 0 |
| Toulouse FC | 2001–02 | 22 | 1 | 1 | 0 | 7 | 0 | 30 | 1 |
| Toulouse FC | 2002–03 | 21 | 0 | 0 | 0 | 5 | 0 | 26 | 0 |
| Toulouse FC | 2003–04 | 24 | 2 | 0 | 0 | 0 | 0 | 24 | 2 |
| Toulouse FC | 2004–05 | 21 | 3 | 0 | 0 | 0 | 0 | 21 | 3 |
| Toulouse FC | 2005–06 | 21 | 2 | 0 | 0 | 0 | 0 | 21 | 2 |
| Toulouse FC | Total | 126 | 8 | 1 | 0 | 12 | 0 | 139 | 8 |
| Montpellier HSC | 2006–07 | 22 | 2 | 1 | 0 | 0 | 0 | 23 | 2 |
| Montpellier HSC | 2007–08 | 19 | 0 | 3 | 0 | 0 | 0 | 22 | 0 |
| Montpellier HSC | 2008–09 | 20 | 1 | 5 | 1 | 0 | 0 | 25 | 2 |
| Montpellier HSC | 2009–10 | 20 | 2 | 5 | 0 | 9 | 1 | 34 | 3 |
| Montpellier HSC | Total | 81 | 5 | 14 | 1 | 9 | 1 | 104 | 7 |
| Olympique Lyonnais | 2010–11 | 19 | 1 | 2 | 1 | 8 | 0 | 29 | 2 |
| Olympique Lyonnais | 2011–12 | 16 | 0 | 5 | 0 | 7 | 0 | 28 | 0 |
| Olympique Lyonnais | 2012–13 | 16 | 0 | 5 | 2 | 5 | 0 | 26 | 2 |
| Olympique Lyonnais | 2013–14 | 9 | 0 | 0 | 0 | 1 | 0 | 10 | 0 |
| Olympique Lyonnais | Total | 60 | 1 | 12 | 3 | 21 | 0 | 93 | 4 |
| Kopparbergs/Göteborg FC | 2014 | 20 | 0 | 1 | 0 | 0 | 0 | 21 | 0 |
| Kopparbergs/Göteborg FC | Total | 20 | 0 | 1 | 0 | 0 | 0 | 21 | 0 |
| AS Saint-Étienne | 2014–15 | 6 | 0 | 4 | 0 | 0 | 0 | 10 | 0 |
| AS Saint-Étienne | 2015–16 | 7 | 0 | 0 | 0 | 0 | 0 | 7 | 0 |
| AS Saint-Étienne | Total | 13 | 0 | 4 | 0 | 0 | 0 | 17 | 0 |
| Career total | | 300 | 14 | 32 | 4 | 42 | 1 | 374 | 19 |

=== International ===
(Correct as of 28 October 2015)

| National team | Season | Apps | Goals |
|---|---|---|---|
| France | 2000–01 | 2 | 0 |
| France | 2001–02 | 2 | 0 |
| France | 2002–03 | 12 | 1 |
| France | 2003–04 | 14 | 0 |
| France | 2004–05 | 10 | 0 |
| France | 2005–06 | 12 | 0 |
| France | 2006–07 | 9 | 0 |
| France | 2007–08 | 3 | 0 |
| France | 2008–09 | 8 | 0 |
| France | 2009–10 | 7 | 0 |
| France | 2010–11 | 8 | 0 |
| France | 2011–12 | 3 | 0 |
| France | 2012–13 | 3 | 0 |
| Total | | 93 | 1 |

==== International goals ====
| # | Date | Venue | Opponent | Score | Result | Competition |
|---|---|---|---|---|---|---|
| 1 | 25 February 2003 | Stade Municipal de Albi, Albi, France | Netherlands | 2–1 | 2–1 | Friendly |

== Honours ==
=== Club ===
Toulouse

- Division 1 Féminine (2): Winner 2000–01, 2001–02
- Coupe de France Féminine (1): Winner 2001–02

Montpellier

- Coupe de France Féminine (2): Winner 2006–07, 2008–09

Lyon

- Division 1 Féminine (4): Winner 2010–11, 2011–12, 2012–13, 2013–14
- Coupe de France Féminine (3): Winner 2011–12, 2012–13, 2013–14
- UEFA Women's Champions League (2): Winner 2010–11, 2011–12
