= 2012 UEFA Women's Champions League final =

- Event: 2011–12 UEFA Women's Champions League
Lyon	Frankfurt
(France)	(Germany)
2	0
- Date: 17 May 2012
- Venue: Olympiastadion, Munich
- Referee: Jenny Palmqvist (Sweden)
- Attendance: 50,212
- Weather: Sunny, 10°C

The 2012 UEFA Women's Champions League final was the final match of the 2011–12 UEFA Women's Champions League, the 11th season of the UEFA Women's Champions League football tournament and the third since it was renamed from the UEFA Women's Cup. The match was held in the Olympiastadion in Munich, Germany on 17 May 2012. Lyon won the tournament, beating Frankfurt 2–0 to retain the trophy.

Lyon played the final for the third consecutive time. It also marked the third time in a row that a French and a German club met in the final.

The attendance of 50,212 was claimed by UEFA as a European record for women's club football, ignoring the existence of earlier reported women's club match attendances of 53,000. Both figures were later surpassed by a 2019 match in Spain.

== Route to the final ==
Lyon		Round	Frankfurt
Opponent	Result	2011–12 UEFA Women's Champions League	Opponent	Result
(Romania) Olimpia Cluj	9–0, 3–0	Round of 32	(Norway) Stabæk	0–1, 4–1
(Czech Republic) Sparta Praha	6–0, 6–0	Round of 16	(France) Paris Saint-Germain	3–0, 1–2
(Denmark) Brøndby	4–0, 4–0	Quarter-finals	(Sweden) LdB FC Malmö	0–1, 3–0
(Germany) Turbine Potsdam	5–1, 0–0	Semi-finals	(England) Arsenal	2–1, 2–0

== Match ==
=== Details ===
17 May 2012
18:00 CEST

Lyon (France)	2–0	(Germany) Frankfurt
Le Sommer 15' (pen.); Abily 28'	Report

Olympiastadion, Munich
Attendance: 50,212
Referee: Jenny Palmqvist (Sweden)

Lyon	Frankfurt

GK	26	(France) Sarah Bouhaddi
DF	3	(France) Wendie Renard
DF	17	(France) Corine Franco
DF	18	(France) Sonia Bompastor (c)
DF	20	(France) Sabrina Viguier
MF	6	(France) Amandine Henry	(yellow card) 90+1'
MF	9	(France) Eugénie Le Sommer		(substituted off) 65'
MF	10	(France) Louisa Necib		(substituted off) 49'
MF	11	(Costa Rica) Shirley Cruz Traña
MF	23	(France) Camille Abily
FW	8	(Sweden) Lotta Schelin		(substituted off) 88'
Substitutions:
GK	1	(France) Céline Deville
DF	5	(France) Laura Georges
MF	14	(Brazil) Rosana		(substituted on) 65'
MF	15	(France) Aurélie Kaci
MF	21	(Switzerland) Lara Dickenmann		(substituted on) 49'
MF	22	(Japan) Ami Otaki		(substituted on) 88'
FW	4	(France) Makan Traoré
Manager:
Patrice Lair

GK	26	(Germany) Desirée Schumann
DF	2	(United States) Gina Lewandowski
DF	4	(Japan) Saki Kumagai
DF	5	(Sweden) Sara Thunebro
DF	12	(Germany) Meike Weber	(substituted off) 61'
DF	25	(Germany) Saskia Bartusiak
MF	7	(Germany) Melanie Behringer
MF	10	(Germany) Dzsenifer Marozsán
MF	18	(Germany) Kerstin Garefrekes
FW	15	(Germany) Svenja Huth	(substituted off) 64'
FW	28	(Germany) Sandra Smisek (c)	(substituted off) 83'
Substitutions:
GK	30	(Germany) Anne-Kathrine Kremer
MF	20	(Germany) Jasmin Herbert
MF	23	(New Zealand) Ria Percival	(substituted on) 61'
FW	6	(Germany) Silvana Chojnowski
FW	11	(Sweden) Jessica Landström	(substituted on) 83'
FW	21	(Switzerland) Ana-Maria Crnogorčević	(substituted on) 64'
Manager:
Sven Kahlert

Assistant referees:
Helen Karo (Sweden)
Anna Nyström (Sweden)
Fourth official:
Sara Persson (Sweden)

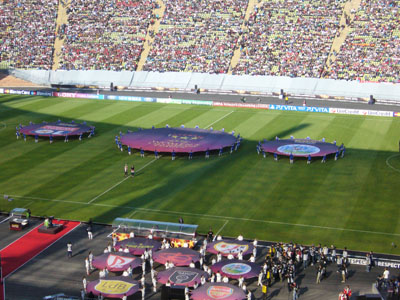
Opening ceremony

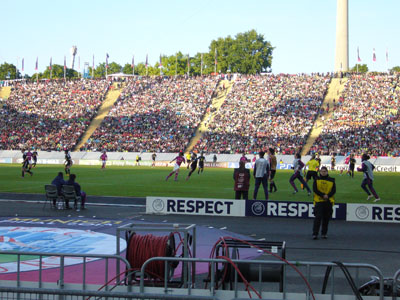
Match scene

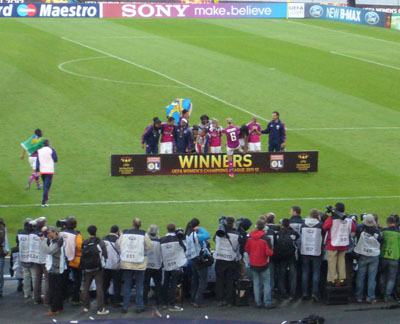
Lyon celebrates

== See also ==
- 2011–12 UEFA Women's Champions League
