= Mélissa Plaza =

French footballer (born 1988)

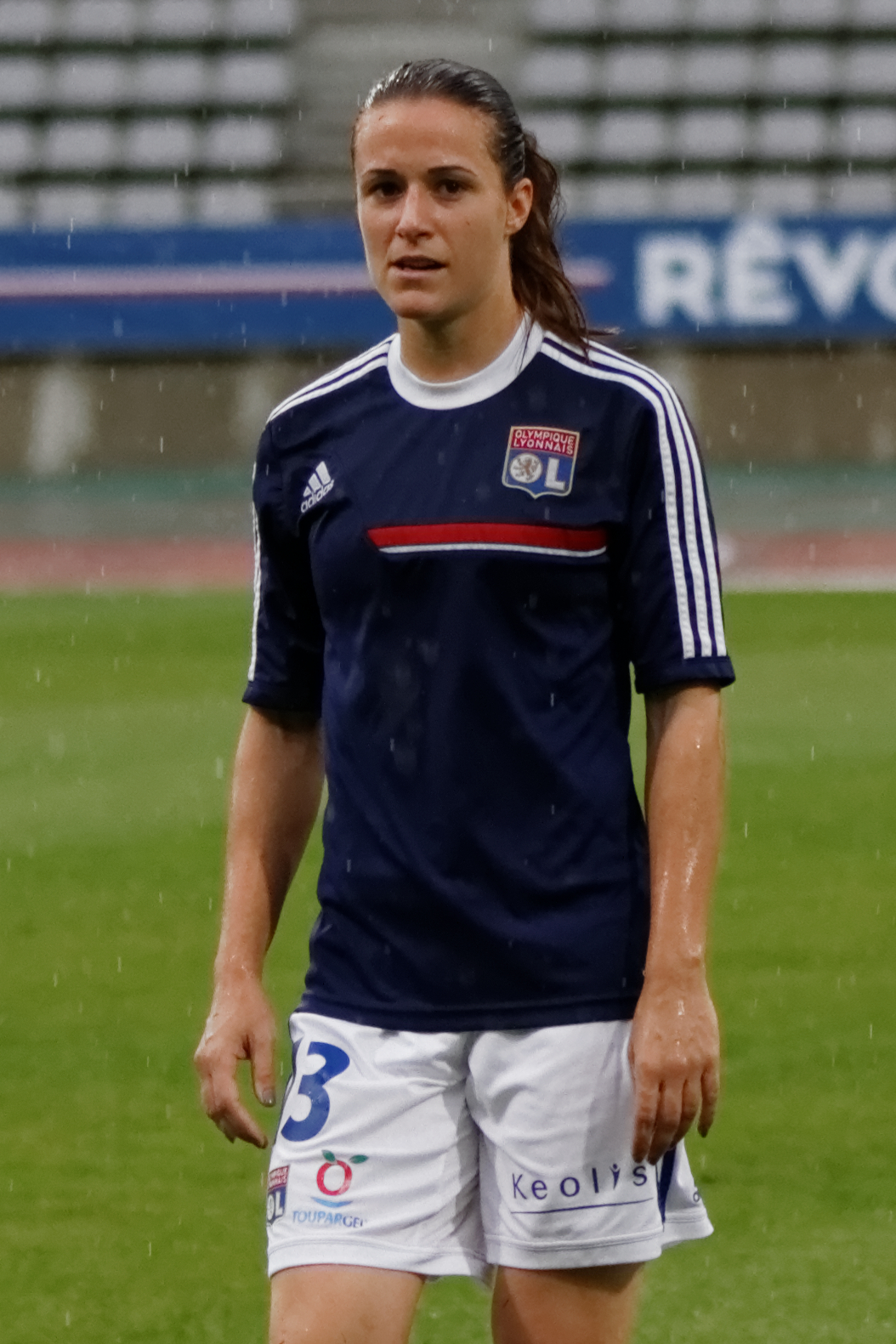
- Plaza with Lyon in 2013.

Personal information
- Full name: Mélissa Plaza
- Date of birth: 28 July 1988 (age 38)
- Place of birth: Saint-Gaudens, France
- Height: 1.69 m (5 ft 7 in)
- Position: Midfielder

Youth career
- 1999–2001: Saint-Pierre-en-Faucigny
- 2001–2002: US Arnage
- 2002–2003: Tours

Senior career*
Years	Team	Apps	(Gls)
2003–2009	La Roche-sur-Yon	93	(8)
2009–2013	Montpellier	70	(2)
2013–2015	Lyon	16	(0)
2015–2016	Guingamp	12	(2)

International career^{‡}
2008	France U20	8	(0)
2009–	France	2	(0)
- * Club domestic league appearances and goals as of 16 September 2016 (UTC) ‡ National team caps and goals as of 16 September 2016 (UTC)

Mélissa Plaza (born 28 July 1988) is a French football player who last played for EA Guingamp of the Division 1 Féminine. She plays as a defensive midfielder. Plaza is a former women's youth international having played with the under-20 team at the 2008 FIFA U-20 Women's World Cup and is a currently a member of the senior team making her debut in 2009. She also played with the France team at 2009 Summer Universiade Games where she netted two goals.

== Club statistics ==
Club	Season	League		Cup		Continental		Total	
Club	Season	Apps	Goals	Apps	Goals	Apps	Goals	Apps	Goals
La Roche-sur-Yon	2003–04	7	0	0	0	0	0	7	0
La Roche-sur-Yon	2004–05	0	0	0	0	0	0	0	0
La Roche-sur-Yon	2005–06	22	2	0	0	0	0	22	2
La Roche-sur-Yon	2006–07	22	0	0	0	0	0	22	0
La Roche-sur-Yon	2007–08	21	0	0	0	0	0	21	0
La Roche-sur-Yon	2008–09	21	6	0	0	0	0	21	6
La Roche-sur-Yon	Total	93	8	0	0	0	0	93	8
Montpellier	2009–10	22	1	5	2	9	1	36	4
Montpellier	2010–11	19	0	3	0	0	0	22	0
Montpellier	2011–12	11	1	5	0	0	0	16	1
Montpellier	2012–13	18	0	5	0	0	0	23	0
Montpellier	Total	68	2	18	2	9	1	95	5
Career total		161	10	18	2	9	1	188	13
