= 2015–16 Division 1 Féminine =

Division 1 Féminine
- Season: 2015–16
- Champions: Lyon (10th title)
- Relegated: VGA Saint-Maur; Nîmes MG; La Roche-sur-Yon
- Champions League: Lyon; Paris Saint-Germain
- Matches: 132
- Goals: 502 (3.8 per match)
- Top goalscorer: Ada Hegerberg (33 goals)
- Biggest home win: Lyon 12–0 Guingamp (17 January 2016)
- Biggest away win: Nîmes MG 0–10 Lyon (20 December 2015)
- Highest scoring: Lyon 12–0 Guingamp (17 January 2016)
- Longest winning run: 10 matches Lyon; Paris Saint-Germain
- Longest unbeaten run: 22 matches Lyon

The 2015–16 Division 1 Féminine season was the 42nd since its establishment. Lyon successfully retained the title on 8 May 2016, making it the tenth Division 1 title in a row. The season began on 30 August 2015 and ended on 21 May 2016.

== Teams ==
Location of teams in 2015–16 Division 1 Féminine

There were three promoted teams from the Division 2 Féminine, the second level of women's football in France, replacing the three teams that were relegated from the Division 1 Féminine following the 2014–15 season. A total of 12 teams currently compete in the league with three clubs suffering relegation to the second division, Division 2 Féminine.

Teams promoted to 2015–16 Division 1 Féminine

- La Roche-sur-Yon
- Nîmes Métropole Gard
- VGA Saint-Maur

Teams relegated to 2015–16 Division 2 Féminine

- Arras
- Issy
- Metz

=== Stadia and locations ===
Club	Location	Venue	Capacity
Albi	Albi	Stade Maurice-Rigaud	3,000
Guingamp	Saint-Brieuc	Stade Fred-Aubert	13,500
Juvisy	Bondoufle	Stade Robert-Bobin	18,850
La Roche-sur-Yon	La Roche-sur-Yon	Stade Henri-Desgranges	10,000
Nîmes Métropole Gard	Nîmes	Stade des Costières	18,482
Lyon	Lyon	Plaine des Jeux de Gerland	2,200
Montpellier	Montpellier	Stade de Grammont	1,000
Paris Saint-Germain	Paris	Stade Charléty	20,000
Rodez	Rodez	Stade Paul-Lignon	5,955
Saint-Étienne	Feurs	Stade Maurice-Rousson	2,800
Soyaux	Soyaux	Stade Léo-Lagrange	4,800
VGA Saint-Maur	Bonneuil-sur-Marne	Stade Adolphe-Chéron	3,500

== League table ==
Note: A win in D1 Féminine is worth 4 points, with 2 points for a draw and 1 for a defeat.

Pos	Team	Pld	W	D	L	GF	GA	GD	Pts	Qualification or relegation
1	Lyon (C)	22	19	3	0	115	4	+111	82	Qualification for the Champions League Round of 32
2	Paris Saint-Germain	22	18	3	1	75	13	+62	79	Qualification for the Champions League Round of 32
3	Montpellier	22	15	4	3	58	11	+47	71	
4	Juvisy	22	15	3	4	49	19	+30	70	
5	Rodez	22	9	3	10	33	47	−14	52	
6	Saint-Étienne	22	8	5	9	31	38	−7	51	
7	Soyaux	22	7	4	11	27	51	−24	47	
8	Guingamp	22	8	1	13	26	60	−34	47	
9	Albi	22	6	5	11	25	44	−19	45	
10	La Roche-sur-Yon (R)	22	5	1	16	24	58	−34	38	Relegation to Division 2 Féminine
11	VGA Saint-Maur (R)	22	2	2	18	22	78	−56	30	Relegation to Division 2 Féminine
12	Nîmes Métropole Gard (R)	22	1	4	17	17	79	−62	29	Relegation to Division 2 Féminine

Source: statsfootofeminin.fr (in French)
Rules for classification: 1) points; 2) goal difference; 3) goals scored
(C) Champions; (R) Relegated

== Results ==
Home \ Away	ALB	GUI	JUV	LRO	LYO	MON	NMG	PSG	ROD	SET	SOY	VSM
Albi		1–0	1–2	1–1	0–4	2–1	2–1	2–3	0–0	0–3	0–0	4–2
Guingamp	3–2		0–3	1–0	0–8	1–2	1–0	1–4	4–1	3–1	0–1	5–2
Juvisy	3–0	5–0		2–0	0–1	1–2	5–0	0–5	3–0	2–1	4–1	2–0
La Roche-sur-Yon	0–3	1–0	0–4		0–5	0–2	3–1	1–5	0–3	2–3	2–3	4–1
Lyon	6–0	12–0	2–0	6–0		1–1	9–0	5–0	5–0	5–0	7–1	8–1
Montpellier	3–0	3–0	1–3	2–0	0–0		1–0	1–2	4–0	1–0	7–0	5–0
Nîmes Métropole Gard	1–1	0–2	0–3	2–4	0–10	0–7		0–5	2–4	1–2	2–2	3–2
Paris Saint-Germain	3–0	6–0	2–2	4–0	0–0	0–0	8–0		5–0	3–0	3–0	7–0
Rodez	2–2	2–0	1–1	3–2	0–6	0–3	3–1	0–1		1–0	2–3	5–2
Saint-Étienne	2–1	1–1	2–2	3–0	0–3	1–1	2–2	0–4	3–0		1–2	2–2
Soyaux	3–0	4–1	0–1	2–3	1–5	0–6	0–0	0–2	0–2	1–2		2–0
VGA Saint-Maur	1–3	1–3	0–1	2–1	0–7	0–5	3–1	1–3	0–4	1–2	1–1	

Source: statsfootofeminin.fr (in French)
Legend: Blue = home team win; Yellow = draw; Red = away team win.

== Season statistics ==
=== Top scorers ===
Rank	Player	Club	Goals
1	(Norway) Ada Hegerberg	Lyon	33
2	(Brazil) Cristiane	Paris Saint-Germain	15
3	(Sweden) Lotta Schelin	Lyon	14
4	(France) Marie-Laure Delie	Paris Saint-Germain	12
4	(France) Julie Peruzzetto	Saint-Étienne	12
6	(France) Marie-Charlotte Léger	Montpellier	11
6	(Nigeria) Desire Oparanozie	Guingamp	11
6	(France) Gaëtane Thiney	Juvisy	11
9	(France) Camille Abily	Lyon	10
9	(France) Laura Bourgouin	Soyaux	10
9	(France) Kadidiatou Diani	Juvisy	10
9	(France) Eugénie Le Sommer	Lyon	10
9	(Germany) Anja Mittag	Paris Saint-Germain	10
9	(Cameroon) Marlyse Ngo Ndoumbouk	VGA Saint-Maur	10
9	(France) Laëtitia Tonazzi	Montpellier	10

=== Hat-tricks ===
Player	For	Against	Result	Date	Ref.
(France) Valérie Gauvin	Montpellier	Nîmes Métropole Gard	7–0	30 August 2015	
(Norway) Ada Hegerberg	Lyon	Paris Saint-Germain	5–0	27 September 2015	
(Brazil) Cristiane	Paris Saint-Germain	Nîmes Métropole Gard	8–0	4 October 2015	
(Norway) Ada Hegerberg	Lyon	La Roche-sur-Yon	6–0	11 October 2015	
(Brazil) Cristiane	Paris Saint-Germain	VGA Saint-Maur	7–0	18 October 2015	
(France) Audrey Nicolas	La Roche-sur-Yon	VGA Saint-Maur	4–1	5 December 2015	
(Norway) Ada Hegerberg	Lyon	VGA Saint-Maur	8–1	13 December 2015	
(Sweden) Lotta Schelin^{4}	Lyon	Nîmes Métropole Gard	10–0	20 December 2015	
(Norway) Ada Hegerberg	Lyon	Guingamp	12–0	17 January 2016	
(Norway) Ada Hegerberg	Lyon	Albi	6–0	27 March 2016	
(Nigeria) Desire Oparanozie	Guingamp	Saint-Étienne	3–1	27 March 2016	
(France) Laëtitia Tonazzi	Montpellier	Soyaux	7–0	24 April 2016	
(Norway) Ada Hegerberg	Lyon	Soyaux	5–1	8 May 2016	

^{4} Player scored 4 goals
