= Gaëtane Thiney =

French footballer (born 1985)

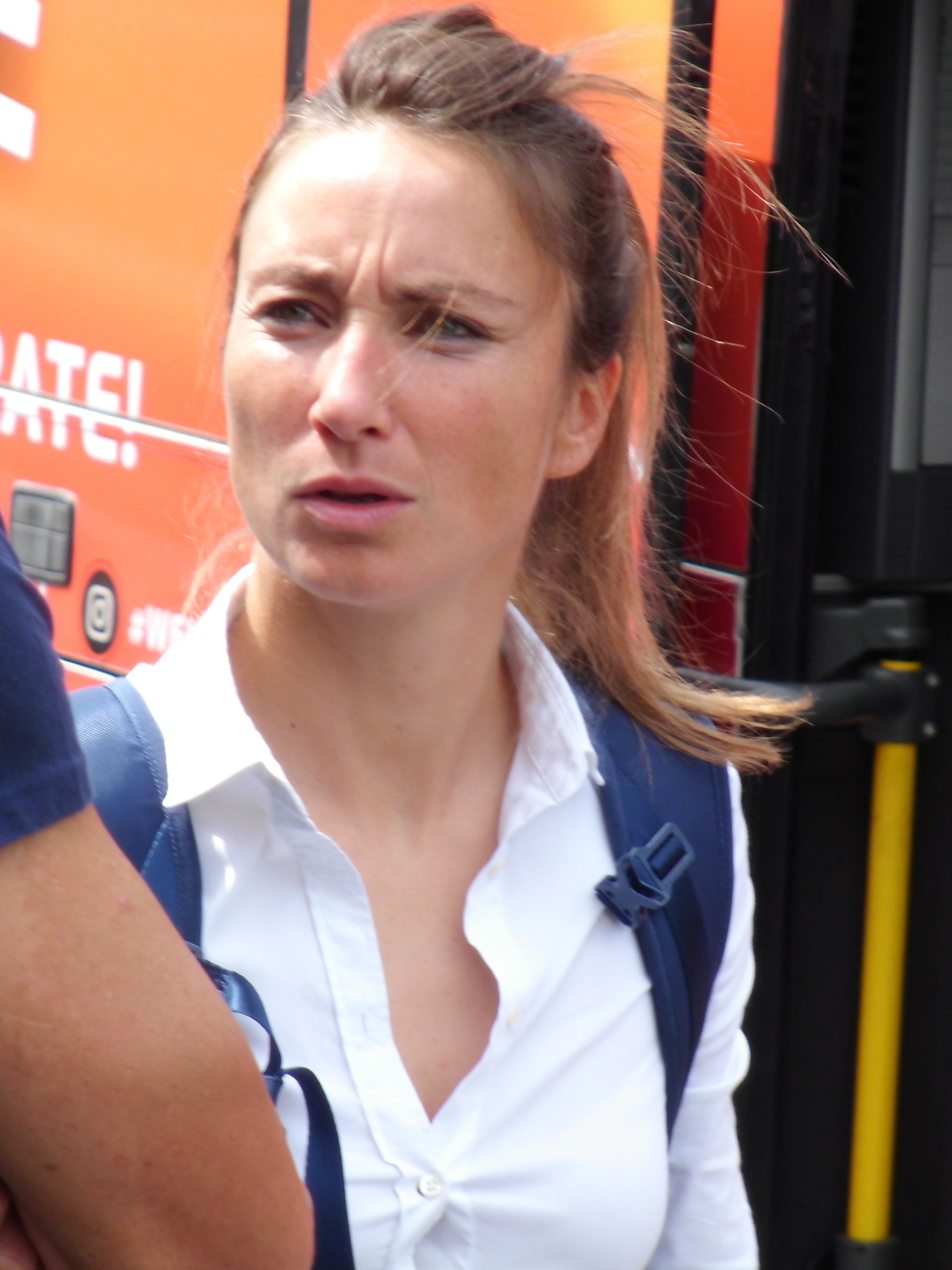
- Thiney in 2017

Personal information
- Full name: Gaëtane Iza Laure Thiney
- Date of birth: 28 October 1985 (age 41)
- Place of birth: Troyes, France
- Height: 1.70 m (5 ft 7 in)
- Positions: Midfielder; striker

Youth career
- 1990–1998: Brienne-le-Château
- 1998–2000: Olympique Saint-Memmie

Senior career*
Years	Team	Apps	(Gls)
2000–2006	Olympique Saint-Memmie	126	(22)
2006–2008	US Compiègne Oise	39	(25)
2008–2025	Paris FC (Note: Known as FCF Juvisy until July 2017.)	343	(161)
2021	→ NJ/NY Gotham FC (loan)	13	(2)
Total		521	(210)

International career
2001–2002	France U17	5	(0)
2003–2004	France U19	25	(5)
2005–2007	France U21	6	(1)
2007–2019	France	163	(58)
- * Club domestic league appearances and goals

Gaëtane Iza Laure Thiney (born 28 October 1985) is a French former footballer who played as a midfielder or striker. She spent most of her career with Première Ligue club Paris FC.

Thiney was also a member of the France national team, making her first major tournament appearance with her nation at UEFA Women's Euro 2009. She is a two-time winner of the Division 1 Féminine player of the year award.

== Club career ==
Thiney began her career playing for ASS Brienne-le-Château in the commune of Brienne-le-Château, which is 26 miles northeast of her hometown Troyes. After a stint in the youth system, she moved a few miles north to Olympique Saint-Memmie, who were playing in the first division of French women's football. She made her league debut with Saint-Memmie during the 2000–01 season. Thiney spent six seasons at the club and, following the 2005–06 season, secured a moved to US Compiègne Oise in Compiègne. In her first season with the club, she appeared in 21 matches and scored five goals. Unfortunately, Compiègne suffered relegation to the second division. Thiney spent her final season with the club in D2 Féminine and was easily the best player in the team appearing in 18 matches and scoring a team-leading 20 goals.

Thiney's successful play earned her a call-up to the national team and also a move to top-tier club FCF Juvisy. In Thiney's first season with Juvisy, she appeared in 21 matches. She scored seven goals, helping Juvisy finish in 3rd position, one point shy of qualifying for the newly created UEFA Women's Champions League. In the 2009–10 season, Thiney remained potent on the field scoring nine goals helping Juvisy finish runner-up to Lyon in the league, which inserted the club into the 2010–11 edition of the UEFA Women's Champions League. In the competition, she scored a goal in the first qualifying round against Estonian club Levadia Tallinn in a 12–0 win. After contributing to Juvisy reaching the knockout stage, Thiney increased her contribution by scoring a goal in each leg of the team's 9–0 aggregate victory over Icelandic club Breiðablik in the Round of 32. Juvisy ultimately suffered elimination in the competition at the hands of the defending champions Turbine Potsdam. In league play, Thiney converted 11 goals, second-best on the team behind lead striker Laëtitia Tonazzi. Juvisy, however, finished the season in a disappointing 4th place.

Thiney retired from professional football in May 2025.

== International career ==
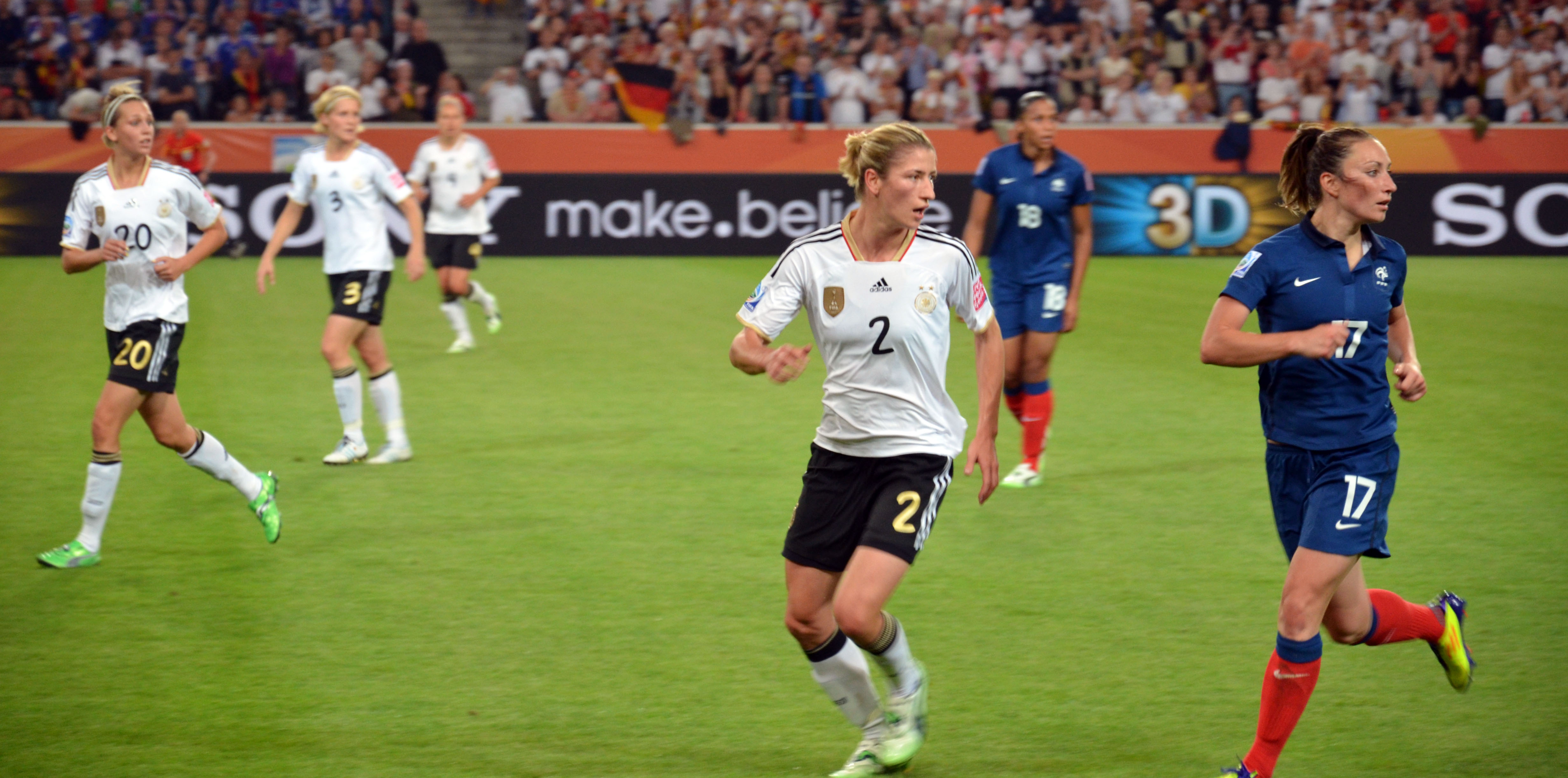
Gaëtane Thiney, in blue, and Bianca Schmidt in the France-Germany match at the 2011 FIFA Women's World Cup

Thiney made her international debut on 28 February 2007 in a 2–0 victory over China. During qualification for the UEFA Women's Euro 2009, she scored two goals against Slovenia and Serbia. In the tournament, she scored her only goal in France's 1–5 group stage defeat to the eventual champions Germany. France reached as far as the quarterfinals, losing to the Netherlands 4–5 on penalties. On 28 October 2009, Thiney scored her first career hat trick in a 2011 FIFA Women's World Cup qualification match against Estonia in a 12–0 victory. Thiney finished the qualification campaign with a team-high 12 goals, including a goal in the team's 3–2 second leg World Cup playoff victory over Italy, which allowed France qualification to the competition.

At the World Cup, Thiney was the decisive player in the team's second group stage match against Canada, scoring a double in a 4–0 win. The victory allowed France progress to the knockout stage portion of the competition.

== Career statistics ==
=== Club ===
Statistics accurate as of 26 July 2022.

Club	Season	League		Cup		Continental		Total	
Club	Season	Apps	Goals	Apps	Goals	Apps	Goals	Apps	Goals
Saint-Memmie	2001–02	18	2	0	0	0	0	18	2
Saint-Memmie	2002–03	20	3	0	0	0	0	20	3
Saint-Memmie	2003–04	22	1	0	0	0	0	22	1
Saint-Memmie	2004–05	20	6	0	0	0	0	20	6
Saint-Memmie	2005–06	22	7	0	0	0	0	22	7
Saint-Memmie	Total	102	19	0	0	0	0	102	19
Compiègne	2006–07	21	5	0	0	0	0	21	5
Compiègne	2007–08	18	20	4	5	0	0	22	25
Compiègne	Total	39	25	4	5	0	0	43	30
Paris FC	2008–09	21	10	3	0	0	0	24	10
Paris FC	2009–10	22	9	4	1	0	0	26	10
Paris FC	2010–11	21	11	4	3	9	4	34	18
Paris FC	2011–12	22	14	3	2	0	0	25	16
Paris FC	2012–13	17	13	2	5	8	2	27	20
Paris FC	2013–14	22	25	2	0	0	0	24	25
Paris FC	2014–15	22	14	4	4	0	0	26	18
Paris FC	2015–16	21	11	3	3	0	0	24	14
Paris FC	2016–17	21	8	4	3	0	0	25	8
Paris FC	2017–18	22	11	2	1	0	0	24	12
Paris FC	2018–19	22	8	4	2	0	0	26	10
Paris FC	2019–20	14	2	0	0	0	0	14	2
Paris FC	2020-21	22	3	1	0	0	0	23	3
Paris FC	Total	269	139	36	24	17	6	322	166
Career total		410	183	40	24	17	6	467	215

=== International ===
As of 9 November 2019

National team	Season	Apps	Goals
France	2006–07	8	2
France	2007–08	8	3
France	2008–09	7	0
France	2009–10	13	8
France	2010–11	14	8
France	2011–12	18	9
France	2012–13	19	5
France	2013–14	22	15
France	2014–15	18	5
France	2015–16	0	0
France	2016–17	14	0
France	2017–18	5	2
France	2018–19	15	1
France	2019–20	2	0
Total		163	58

==== International goals ====
#	Date	Venue	Opponent	Score	Result	Competition
1	28 February 2007	Stade Robert Brettes, Mérignac, France	China	1–0	2–0	Friendly
2	30 May 2007	Stade Lebon, Angoulême, France	Slovenia	6–0	6–0	UEFA Women's Euro 2009 qualifying
3	1 October 2007	Mitsubishi Forklift Stadion, Almere, Netherlands	Netherlands	0–4	1–4	Friendly
4	27 October 2007	Stadion Kralj Petar I, Belgrade, Serbia	Serbia	0–7	0–8	UEFA Women's Euro 2009 qualifying
5	8 March 2008	Stade Mohamed V, Casablanca, Morocco	Morocco	0–4	0–6	Friendly
6	27 August 2009	Ratina Stadion, Tampere, Finland	Germany	4–1	5–1	UEFA Women's Euro 2009
7	24 October 2009	Stade de Gerland, Lyon, France	Iceland	1–0	2–0	2011 FIFA Women's World Cup qualification
8	28 October 2009	Stade Jules Deschaseaux, Le Havre, France	Estonia	4–0	12–0	2011 FIFA Women's World Cup qualification
9	28 October 2009	Stade Jules Deschaseaux, Le Havre, France	Estonia	6–0	12–0	2011 FIFA Women's World Cup qualification
10	28 October 2009	Stade Jules Deschaseaux, Le Havre, France	Estonia	7–0	12–0	2011 FIFA Women's World Cup qualification
11	21 November 2009	Gradski Stadion, Inđija, Serbia	Serbia	0–1	0–2	2011 FIFA Women's World Cup qualification
12	20 June 2010	Stade Léo Lagrange, Besançon, France	Croatia	1–0	3–0	2011 FIFA Women's World Cup qualification
13	23 June 2010	Kadrioru Stadium, Tallinn, Estonia	Estonia	0–1	0–6	2011 FIFA Women's World Cup qualification
14	21 August 2010	Laugardalsvöllur, Reykjavík, Iceland	Iceland	0–1	0–1	2011 FIFA Women's World Cup qualification
15	25 August 2010	Stade de l'Aube, Troyes, France	Serbia	2–0	7–0	2011 FIFA Women's World Cup qualification
16	25 August 2010	Stade de l'Aube, Troyes, France	Serbia	5–0	7–0	2011 FIFA Women's World Cup qualification
17	25 August 2010	Stade de l'Aube, Troyes, France	Serbia	7–0	7–0	2011 FIFA Women's World Cup qualification
18	15 September 2010	Stadio Pietro Barbetti, Gubbio, Italy	Italy	1–2	2–3	2011 FIFA Women's World Cup qualification
19	2 March 2011	GSP Stadium, Nicosia, Cyprus	Switzerland	0–1	0–2	2011 Cyprus Cup
20	30 June 2011	Ruhrstadion, Bochum, Germany	Canada	0–1	0–4	2011 FIFA Women's World Cup
21	30 June 2011	Ruhrstadion, Bochum, Germany	Canada	0–2	0–4	2011 FIFA Women's World Cup
22	22 October 2011	Parc y Scarlets, Llanelli, Wales	Wales	1–1	1–4	UEFA Women's Euro 2013 qualifying
23	22 October 2011	Parc y Scarlets, Llanelli, Wales	Wales	1–3	1–4	UEFA Women's Euro 2013 qualifying
24	26 October 2011	Stade de l'Aube, Troyes, France	Israel	1–0	5–0	UEFA Women's Euro 2013 qualifying
25	26 October 2011	Stade de l'Aube, Troyes, France	Israel	3–0	5–0	UEFA Women's Euro 2013 qualifying
26	26 October 2011	Stade de l'Aube, Troyes, France	Israel	4–0	5–0	UEFA Women's Euro 2013 qualifying
27	16 November 2011	Stade René Serge Nabajoth, Pointe-à-Pitre, Guadeloupe	Uruguay	1–0	8–0	Friendly
28	16 November 2011	Stade René Serge Nabajoth, Pointe-à-Pitre, Guadeloupe	Uruguay	4–0	8–0	Friendly
29	28 February 2012	GSP Stadium, Nicosia, Cyprus	Switzerland	2–0	3–0	2012 Cyprus Cup
30	4 March 2012	Paralimni Stadium, Paralimni, Cyprus	England	0–3	0–3	2012 Cyprus Cup
31	11 July 2012	Stade Pierre Brisson, Beauvais, France	Russia	1–0	3–0	Friendly
32	25 July 2012	Hampden Park, Glasgow, Scotland	United States	0–1	4–2	2012 Summer Olympics
33	6 March 2013	Stade Marcel Picot, Tomblaine, France	Brazil	2–2	2–2	Friendly
34	1 June 2013	Stade du Hainaut, Valenciennes, France	Finland	2–0	3–0	Friendly
35	29 June 2013	Stade Auguste Delaune, Reims, France	Norway	1–0	1–0	Friendly
36	25 September 2013	Kazhimukan Munaitpasov Stadium, Astana, Kazakhstan	Kazakhstan	0–2	0–4	2015 FIFA Women's World Cup qualification
37	25 September 2013	Kazhimukan Munaitpasov Stadium, Astana, Kazakhstan	Kazakhstan	0–4	0–4	2015 FIFA Women's World Cup qualification
38	25 October 2013	Stade Pierre Brisson, Beauvais, France	Poland	5–0	6–0	Friendly
39	23 November 2013	Lovech Stadium, Lovech, Bulgaria	Bulgaria	0–3	0–10	2015 FIFA Women's World Cup qualification
40	23 November 2013	Lovech Stadium, Lovech, Bulgaria	Bulgaria	0–8	0–10	2015 FIFA Women's World Cup qualification
41	23 November 2013	Lovech Stadium, Lovech, Bulgaria	Bulgaria	0–9	0–10	2015 FIFA Women's World Cup qualification
42	28 November 2013	MMArena, Le Mans, France	Bulgaria	3–0	14–0	2015 FIFA Women's World Cup qualification
43	28 November 2013	MMArena, Le Mans, France	Bulgaria	5–0	14–0	2015 FIFA Women's World Cup qualification
44	28 November 2013	MMArena, Le Mans, France	Bulgaria	9–0	14–0	2015 FIFA Women's World Cup qualification
45	28 November 2013	MMArena, Le Mans, France	Bulgaria	13–0	14–0	2015 FIFA Women's World Cup qualification
46	8 February 2014	Stade de la Licorne, Amiens, France	Sweden	1–0	3–0	Friendly
47	12 March 2014	GSP Stadium, Nicosia, Cyprus	England	0–1	0–2	2014 Cyprus Cup
48	5 April 2014	Jean-Bouin Stadium, Angers, France	Kazakhstan	6–0	7–0	2015 FIFA Women's World Cup qualification
49	5 April 2014	Jean-Bouin Stadium, Angers, France	Kazakhstan	7–0	7–0	2015 FIFA Women's World Cup qualification
50	7 May 2014	Stade Léo Lagrange, Besançon, France	Hungary	3–0	4–0	2015 FIFA Women's World Cup qualification
51	13 September 2014	ISS Stadion, Vantaa, Finland	Finland	0–2	0–2	2015 FIFA Women's World Cup qualification
52	9 March 2015	Stadium Bela Vista, Parchal, Portugal	Japan	1–1	1–3	2015 Algarve Cup
53	9 March 2015	Stadium Bela Vista, Parchal, Portugal	Japan	1–3	1–3	2015 Algarve Cup
54	22 May 2015	Stade Gaston Petit, Châteauroux, France	Russia	1–0	2–1	Friendly
55	22 May 2015	Stade Gaston Petit, Châteauroux, France	Russia	2–1	2–1	Friendly
56	1 March 2018	MAPFRE Stadium, Columbus, Ohio, United States	England	4–1	4–1	2018 SheBelieves Cup
57	6 April 2018	MMArena, Le Mans, France	Nigeria	3–0	8–0	Friendly
58	1 September 2018	Stade de la Licorne, Amiens, France	Mexico	2–0	4–0	Friendly
Correct as of 31 August 2019

== Honours ==
Paris FC

- Coupe de France Féminine: 2024–25

France

- UEFA Women's Under-19 Championship: 2003

Individual

- UEFA Women's Championship team of the tournament: 2013
- UNFP Première Ligue player of the year: 2011–12, 2013–14
- Première Ligue top goalscorer: 2013–14
- Coupe de France Féminine top goalscorer: 2024–25
- LFFP Première Ligue team of the season: 2015–16

== See also ==
- List of women's footballers with 100 or more caps
