= Audrey Février =

French footballer (born 1990)

Personal information
- Date of birth: 2 July 1990 (age 36)
- Place of birth: Saint-Malo, France
- Height: 1.77 m (5 ft 10 in)
- Positions: Defender; midfielder

Team information
- Current team: US Saint-Malo

Youth career
- 1996–2000: Jacques Cartier Paramé
- 2000–2005: Rennes

Senior career*
Years	Team	Apps	(Gls)
2005–2015	Guingamp	150	(13)
2015–2020	US Saint-Malo	21	(1)

International career^{‡}
2004–2006	France U17	13	(0)
2007–2009	France U19	14	(0)
2010	France U20	3	(0)
- * Club domestic league appearances and goals as of 16 September 2016 (UTC) ‡ National team caps and goals as of 16 September 2010 (UTC)

Audrey Février (born 2 July 1990) is a French former football player.

She played for Guingamp of the Division 1 Féminine for eleven seasons and also captained the club before finishing her career at US Saint-Malo of the Division 2 Féminine. She is equally adept at playing as either a central defender or a midfielder.

Born in Saint-Malo, Février began playing football with local club Jacques-Cartier Paramé. In 2000, she and her brother, Gaëtan, joined Rennes' youth academy. Neither made a senior appearance for the club, but Audrey would make her Division 1 debut with Guingamp (at the time known as Stade Briochin).

Février played for France at youth level.
