= Eugénie Le Sommer =

French footballer (born 1989)

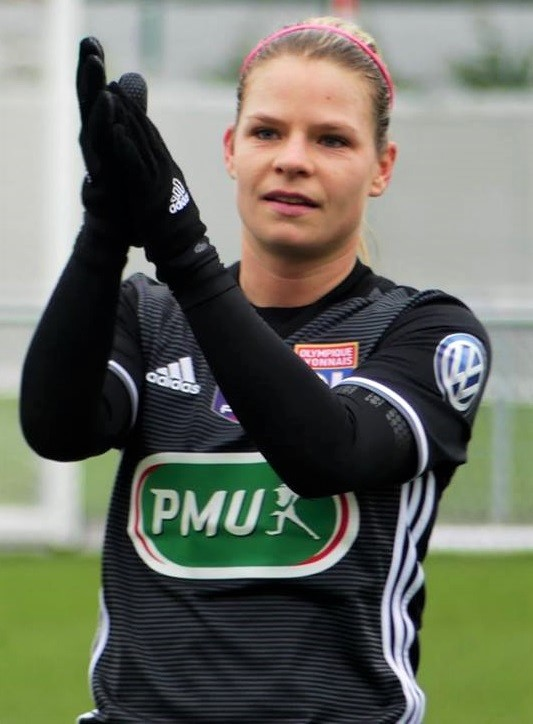
- Le Sommer with Lyon in 2018

Personal information
- Full name: Eugénie Anne Claudine Le Sommer
- Date of birth: 18 May 1989 (age 37)
- Place of birth: Grasse, France
- Height: 1.61 m (5 ft 3 in)
- Position: Forward

Team information
- Current team: Toluca
- Number: 9

Youth career
- 1994–1998: Trélissac
- 1998–2004: AS Guermeur
- 2004–2007: Lorient
- 2007: CNFE Clairefontaine

Senior career*
Years	Team	Apps	(Gls)
2007–2010	Stade Briochin	65	(33)
2010–2025	Lyon	262	(202)
2021	→ OL Reign (loan)	17	(7)
2025–	Toluca	27	(27)

International career^{‡}
2004–2005	France U17	4	(0)
2006–2008	France U19	26	(11)
2008–2009	France U20	8	(5)
2009–	France	200	(94)
Medal record
Women's football
Representing France
UEFA Women's Nations League
Runner-up	2024
- * Club domestic league appearances and goals as of 31 January 2026 ‡ National team caps and goals as of 4 April 2025

Eugénie Anne Claudine Le Sommer-Dariel (born 18 May 1989) is a French professional footballer who plays as a forward for Liga MX Femenil club Toluca and the France national team. She primarily plays as a creative attacking midfielder and left winger, but has also played as a second striker for her country.

Le Sommer is one of the most decorated players in modern women's club football and has scored more goals for France than any player of both men and women. She has won 13 French domestic league titles and is one of just three players to have won a record eight UEFA Women's Champions League with Lyon.

== Early life ==
Le Sommer is one of seven children, five girls and two boys. Her father, Thierry, was a retired policeman. Her mother had played football in her youth.

== Club career ==
=== Early years ===
Le Sommer began playing football at the age of five joining the women's section of Trélissac FC. After a four-year stint at the club, she joined AS Guermeur in the Brittany region. She later played at one of the biggest clubs in the region, FC Lorient, and earned many honors in the youth section of the club helping her youth sides win the Coupe Fédérale 16 ans in 2005 and the Mozaïc Foot Challenge in 2006, with the latter being held at the prestigious Clairefontaine academy.

Le Sommer was later selected to attend CNFE Clairefontaine, the women's section of the Clairefontaine academy.

=== Stade Briochin (2007-2010) ===
After a short stint there, she joined D1 Féminine club Stade Briochin. In her debut season with Saint-Brieuc, Le Sommer appeared in all 22 league matches scoring four goals. The 2008–09 season saw her score 10 goals in 22 matches. For her efforts, she was nominated for the UNFP Female Player of the Year losing out to Lyon player Louisa Necib.

Le Sommer got off to a fast start for the 2009–10 season scoring ten goals in her first seven league matches, which included a hat trick against Toulouse in a 5–4 defeat. She finished the season as the league's top scorer and was awarded the UNFP Female Player of the Year the following season.

=== Olympique lyonnais (2010-2025) ===
On 30 June 2010, Le Sommer announced she would be joining the four-time defending champions Lyon departing her former club, Stade Briochin, after three seasons.

On 30 August 2020, Le Sommer scored the opening goal in Lyon's 3–1 defeat of Wolfsburg in the final of the 2019–20 UEFA Women's Champions League. It was both Le Sommer and Lyon's seventh overall win in the competition and fifth in a row.

On 12 May 2021, it was announced that Le Sommer would be joining OL Reign in the US on loan for the 2021 season.

Following fifteen seasons at Olympique Lyonnais, Le Sommer’s tenure concluded in the summer of 2025 after management informed her in May that her contract would not be renewed. Although she had anticipated this outcome following months of administrative silence, she found the late notice disappointing and described her final match as an intensely stressful experience exceeding the pressure of major finals.

=== Toluca (since 2025) ===
In the summer of 2025, Le Sommer joined Deportivo Toluca in Mexico’s Liga MX Femenil, seeking a sporting and cultural challenge different from European football. Her arrival was part of a broader "French revolution" at the club, which included the signing of Faustine Robert and former Lyon teammate Amandine Henry under the management of Patrice Lair.

During the 2025 Apertura tournament, she scored eight goals in her first eight appearances, including a hat-trick against Cruz Azul in August. She concluded the opening tournament with thirteen goals as Toluca finished in fourth place before being eliminated in the quarter-finals of the championship playoffs. She began the 2026 Clausura season with a hat-trick in a 5–3 victory over Tijuana during the opening round in January. By 8 February 2026, Le Sommer had reached 21 goals in 23 matches for Toluca, a tally that placed her among the top five all-time leading scorers in the club's history.

== International career ==
Le Sommer has earned caps with the women's under-17, under-19, and under-20 teams. With the under-19 team, she participated in both the 2007 and 2008 editions of the La Manga Cup, as well as both the 2007 UEFA Women's Under-19 Championship, as an underage player, and 2008 UEFA Women's Under-19 Championship, with the latter being held on home soil. France reached the semi-finals at the 2007 finals and were eliminated in the group stage in 2008. Le Sommer later featured with the under-20 team at the 2008 FIFA U-20 Women's World Cup, held in Chile. In the tournament, Le Sommer scored a team-leading four goals, which included a brace against Argentina in the final group stage match, which sent France through to the knockout rounds to face Nigeria. In the match against Nigeria, with France trailing 2–1, Le Sommer equalised in the 49th minute. France won 3–2 with a late goal from Nora Coton-Pélagie, but were eliminated in the next round by North Korea. Le Sommer was awarded the Bronze Ball as the tournament's third best player.

On 12 February 2009, Le Sommer made her international debut in a 2–0 win over the Republic of Ireland coming on as a substitute. After appearing consistently with the national team, which included scoring two goals over the course of four matches at a tournament in Cyprus, Le Sommer was selected by coach Bruno Bini to play at UEFA Women's Euro 2009, despite the player not appearing with the team during the qualification process. During the tournament, Le Sommer played in all four matches her nation contested. France reached as far as the quarterfinals losing to the Netherlands 4–5 on penalties with Le Sommer converting her penalty shot. On 23 September 2009, Le Sommer scored her third international goal against Serbia in a 2011 FIFA Women's World Cup qualification match.

She played for France at the 2012 Summer Olympics, scoring one goal, in the 2–1 loss to Japan in the semifinals.

Le Sommer was a striker for France at the 2015 FIFA Women's World Cup. She scored against England on 9 June 2015 in France's opening 1–0 victory. She also scored two of France's goals in their 3–0 victory over South Korea in the quarterfinal.

She played in France's 2016 Olympic campaign, scoring two goals in the group stage, one against Colombia and one against New Zealand.

On 22 September 2020, Le Sommer scored two goals in a 7–0 win over North Macedonia in the Euro 2021 qualifiers, to become the all-time top scorer with 82 goals, breaking the previous record of 81 goals by Marinette Pichon.

Le Sommer was called up to the France squad for the 2023 FIFA Women's World Cup. In France's second match of the 2023 FIFA Women's World Cup, she scored the opening goal of the match against Brazil.

In July 2024, Le Sommer was named in France's squad for the 2024 Olympics.

In early 2025, Le Sommer reached a historic milestone as the first French player to achieve 200 international caps, a feat achieved while head coach Laurent Bonadei initially utilized her in a super-sub role behind Marie-Antoinette Katoto.

=== Omission from Euro 2025 squad ===
In June 2025, Le Sommer was omitted from France's 23-player squad for Euro 2025, a decision manager Laurent Bonadei justified by citing a need for personnel renewal to break the team's streak of quarter-final exits. Bonadei referenced an Albert Einstein quote regarding the insanity of repeating failed actions while expecting different results, opting instead to prioritize younger players and the 2027 World Cup cycle. Le Sommer, who had been expected to serve as a super-sub and was actively negotiating tournament bonuses as part of the team's leadership group, characterized the exclusion as a betrayal. She expressed profound incomprehension regarding the three-minute phone call used to communicate the decision, which she felt disregarded her fifteen-year commitment to the national team. France's campaign ended in the quarter-finals on July 19, 2025, with a defeat to Germany. Despite playing with a numerical advantage for most of the match and taking an early lead through a Grace Geyoro penalty, France drew 1-1 after extra time and lost 6-5 in a penalty shootout.

== Personal life ==
Le Sommer married Florian Dariel, an Olympique Lyon employee, in Brittany on 11 August 2020, two days after winning the 2019–20 Coupe de France féminine. Current and former teammates such as Ada Hegerberg and Corine Franco attended the ceremony.

== Career statistics ==
=== Club ===
As of match played on 10 January 2024

Appearances and goals by club, season and competition
Club	Season	League			Cup		Continental		Total	
Club	Season	Division	Apps	Goals	Apps	Goals	Apps	Goals	Apps	Goals
Stade Briochin	2007–08	Division 1 Féminine	22	4	1	0	0	0	23	4
Stade Briochin	2008–09	Division 1 Féminine	21	10	3	2	0	0	24	12
Stade Briochin	2009–10	Division 1 Féminine	22	19	2	3	0	0	24	22
Stade Briochin	Total		65	33	6	5	0	0	71	38
Lyon	2010–11	Division 1 Féminine	20	17	4	6	9	5	33	28
Lyon	2011–12	Division 1 Féminine	21	22	5	5	9	9	35	36
Lyon	2012–13	Division 1 Féminine	20	20	6	10	9	1	35	31
Lyon	2013–14	Division 1 Féminine	20	15	5	1	4	1	26	17
Lyon	2014–15	Division 1 Féminine	22	29	5	4	4	5	31	38
Lyon	2015–16	Division 1 Féminine	18	10	5	9	9	5	32	24
Lyon	2016–17	Division 1 Féminine	19	20	4	3	9	6	32	29
Lyon	2017–18	Division 1 Féminine	20	17	6	12	8	4	34	33
Lyon	2018–19	Division 1 Féminine	18	13	5	2	8	6	31	21
Lyon	2019–20	Division 1 Féminine	11	5	3	2	6	5	20	12
Lyon	2020–21	Division 1 Féminine	18	7	1	0	3	0	22	7
Lyon	2021–22	Division 1 Féminine	7	2	2	0	3	0	12	2
Lyon	2022–23	Division 1 Féminine	17	7	6	2	7	0	30	9
Lyon	2023-24	Division 1 Féminine	15	10	3	4	6	1	13	9
Lyon	Total		245	194	61	60	94	48	400	302
Career total			301	223	62	65	94	48	457	336

=== International ===
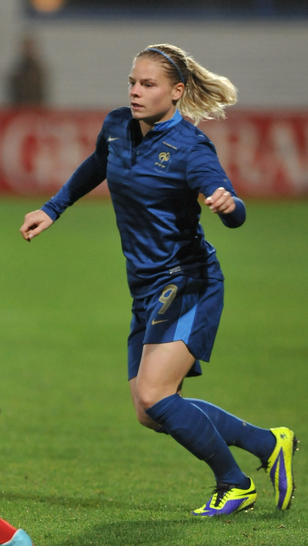
Le Sommer playing for France in 2013.

As of 8 February 2026

Appearances and goals by national team and year
National team	Year	Apps	Goals
France	2008–09	16	3
France	2009–10	11	5
France	2010–11	20	7
France	2011–12	20	10
France	2012–13	16	10
France	2013–14	14	4
France	2014–15	19	13
France	2015–16	14	6
France	2016–17	17	6
France	2017–18	9	9
France	2018–19	11	7
France	2019–20	7	6
France	2020–21	1	0
France	2021–22	0	0
France	2022–23	7	6
France	2023-24	15	5
France	2024-25	8	2
Total		182	92

== Honours ==
Lyon

- Division 1 Féminine: 2010–11, 2011–12, 2012–13, 2013–14, 2014–15, 2015–16, 2016–17, 2017–18, 2018–19, 2019–20, 2021–22, 2022–23, 2023–24
- Coupe de France Féminine: 2011–12, 2012–13, 2013–14, 2014–15, 2015–16, 2016–17, 2018–19, 2019–20, 2022–23
- Trophée des Championnes: 2019, 2022, 2023
- UEFA Women's Champions League: 2010–11, 2011–12, 2015–16, 2016–17, 2017–18, 2018–19, 2019–20, 2021–22

France

- UEFA Women's Nations League runner-up: 2023–24
- Cyprus Cup: 2012, 2014
- SheBelieves Cup: 2017

Individual

- FIFA U-20 Women's World Cup Bronze Ball: 2008
- UNFP Female Player of the Year: 2009–10, 2014–15
- UNFP Première Ligue team of the year: 2023–24
- FIFA Women's World Cup All-Star Team: 2015
- UEFA Women's Player of the Year Award Top 10: 2014–15, 2015–16, 2016–17, 2017–18
- Algarve Cup Best Player: 2015
- France National Championship Best Striker: 2009–10, 2011–12, 2016–17
- UEFA Women's Champions League Best Striker: 2011–12
- UEFA Women's Championship All-Star Team: 2013
- FIFPro: FIFA FIFPro World XI 2015, 2016
- NWSL Best XI: 2021
- Liga MX Femenil Golden Boot: Clausura 2026

== See also ==
- List of women's footballers with 100 or more caps
- List of women footballers with 300 or more goals
