= Laura Bourgouin =

French association football player (born 1992)

Personal information
- Full name: Laura Bourgouin
- Date of birth: 17 September 1992 (age 34)
- Place of birth: Le Mans, France
- Height: 1.51 m (4 ft 11 in)
- Position: Striker

Team information
- Current team: Montpellier

Senior career*
Years	Team	Apps	(Gls)
2006–2013	Le Mans	132	(61)
2013–2023	ASJ Soyaux-Charente	212	(54)
2023-2024	Pomigliano	10	(0)
2024	Bordeaux	10	(0)
2024-2026	Marseille	20	(1)
2026-	Montpellier	0	(0)

International career
2009	France U17	1	(0)
2014–2017	France U23	11	(1)
- * Club domestic league appearances and goals as of 9 July 2026

Laura Bourgouin (born 17 September 1992) is a French footballer who plays as a striker for Montpellier in the Première Ligue.

== Early life ==
Bourgouin was born in 1992 in Le Mans, France.

== Youth career ==
Bourgouin joined the youth academy of French side Le Mans at the age of seven.

== Senior club career ==
Bourgouin started her career with French side Le Mans, helping the club reach the final of the 2009 Coupe de France féminine. In 2013, Bourgouin signed for French side ASJ Soyaux-Charente, where she was regarded as one of the club's most important players.

== International career ==
In 2013, Bourgouin was called up to represent France B team internationally for the first team for a friendly against Romania.

== Style of play ==
Bourgouin mainly operates as a striker and is known for her ability as a playmaker.
