= Claire Guillard =

French footballer (born 1986)

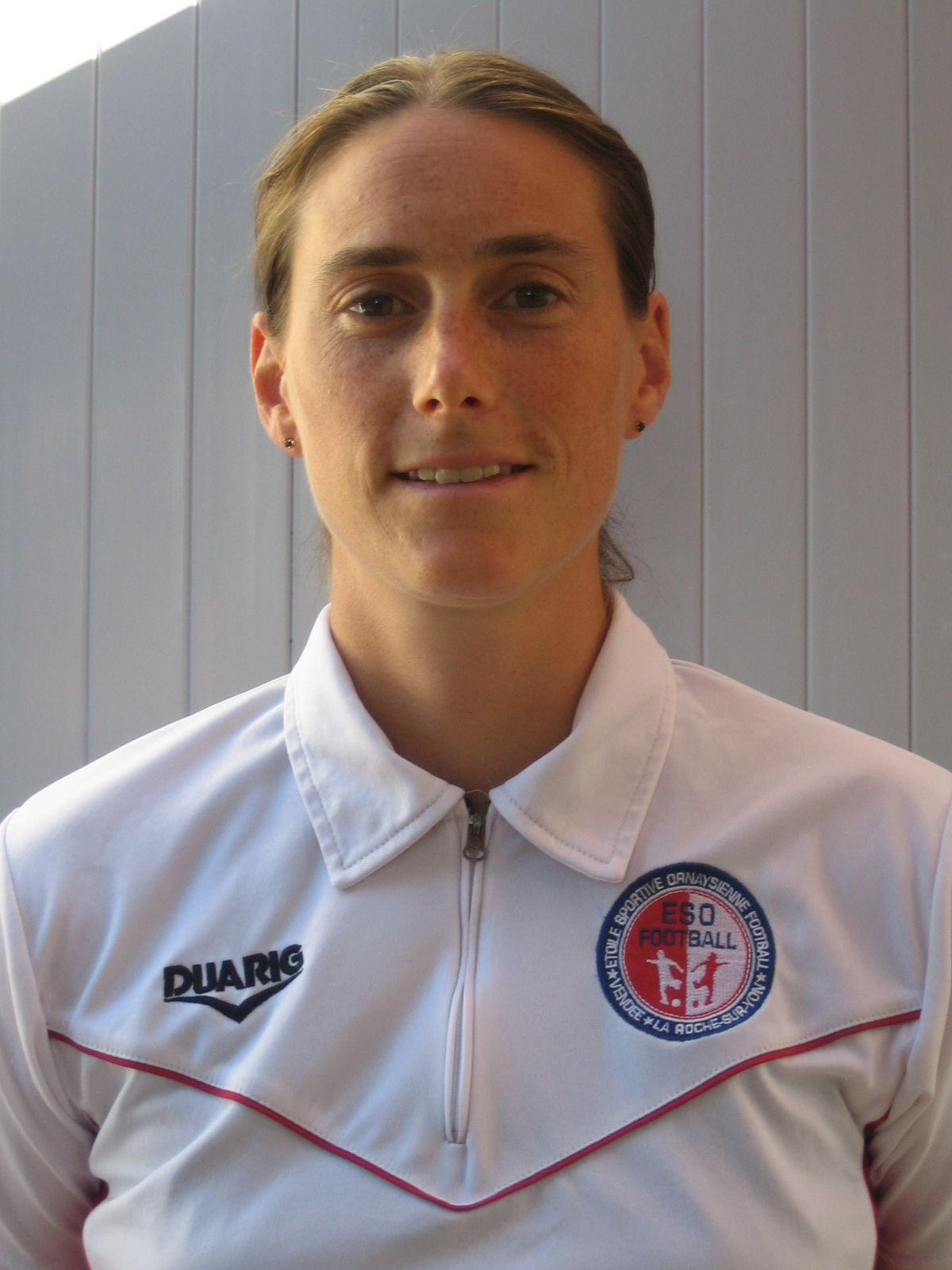

Personal information
- Date of birth: 17 December 1986 (age 39)
- Place of birth: Nantes, France
- Height: 1.73 m (5 ft 8 in)
- Position: Forward

Youth career
- 1996–2001: Savenay

Senior career*
Years	Team	Apps	(Gls)
2001–2005	Nantes Saint-Herblain	56	(0)
2005–2011	Vendée La Roche	90	(31)
2011–2012	Yzeure	15	(2)
2012–2018	Vendée La Roche	107	(89)
2018–2020	Nantes	38	(31)
2020–2021	Croix Blanche Angers	2	(1)
2021–2024	Pornic Foot	72	(63)
2024–2025	Saint-Nazaire	0	(0)
- * Club domestic league appearances and goals

Claire Guillard (born 17 December 1986) is a former French footballer who played as a striker.
