= Safia Bengueddoudj =

French–Algerian footballer (born 1986)

Personal information
- Date of birth: 31 January 1986 (age 40)
- Place of birth: Saint-Priest-en-Jarez, France
- Height: 1.52 m (5 ft 0 in)
- Position: Midfielder

Senior career*
Years	Team	Apps	(Gls)
2001–2009	RC Saint-Étienne	52+	(2+)
2007–2008	RC Saint-Étienne B	2	(0)
2009–2011	AS Saint-Étienne	31	(2)
2011–2016	Le Puy	79	(11)
2016–2017	Saint-Étienne FC		

International career^{‡}
2010	Algeria	3	(0)
- * Club domestic league appearances and goals ‡ National team caps and goals as of 8 November 2010

Safia Bengueddoudj (Arabic: صفية بن جودج; born 31 January 1986) is a former footballer who played as a midfielder. Born in France, she made three appearances for the Algeria women's national team.

== Club career ==
Bengueddoudj has played for RC Saint-Étienne, AS Saint-Étienne, Le Puy Foot 43 Auvergne and Saint-Étienne FC in France.

During this period, she played as an attacking midfielder, with her performances drawing attention for her playing style and her association with the club.

When RC Saint-Étienne merged with AS Saint-Étienne to create the ASSE women's section, Safia Bengueddoudj naturally continued her adventure in the green colours. She became a key player for the team and actively contributed to the club's stability in the national championship.

== International career ==
In November 2007, Safia Bengueddoudj was called up for the first time to the Algerian women's national team, along with her teammate Laetitia Agab, for a training camp in Algiers in preparation for the 2008 AFCON qualifiers.

Bengueddoudj capped for Algeria at senior level during the 2010 African Women's Championship.
