= En Avant Guingamp (women) =

French football club

Guingamp
- Full name: En Avant Guingamp Féminines
- Founded: 1973 as CS Saint-Brieuc; 1999 as Saint-Brieuc FF; 2003 as Stade Briochin; 2009 as EA Guingamp
- Ground: Stade du Roudourou, Guingamp
- Capacity: 18,462
- President: Fred Le grand
- Manager: Jérôme Bonnet
- League: Division 3 Féminine
- 2025–26: Seconde Ligue, 12th of 12 (relegated)
- Website: www.eaguingamp.com/d1-feminine/
Home colours	Away colours

En Avant Guingamp Féminines are a French football club based in Saint-Brieuc, a commune in the Brittany region.

== History ==
The club was previously the women's section of men's football club Stade Briochin and was founded in 1973 under the name Chaffoteaux Sports Saint-Brieuc. From 1999–2003, the club played under the name Saint-Brieuc Football Féminin, switching to Stade Briochin following the end of the 2002–03 season. The club currently plays in the Première Ligue, the first division of women's football in France, and is coached by Frédéric Biancalani.

On 18 August 2011, the presidential hierarchy of men's professional club En Avant Guingamp and Stade Briochin announced that the clubs reached an agreement on a merger, which will come into effect at the start of the 2011–12 season. Under the agreement, Stade Briochin will dissolve and play as the women's team of Guingamp. All other remnants of the club remain the same, such as its president, manager, and players.

== Players ==
=== Current squad ===
As of 3 February 2025

Note: Flags indicate national team as defined under FIFA eligibility rules; some limited exceptions apply. Players may hold more than one non-FIFA nationality.

No.	Pos.	Nation	Player
1	GK	FRA	Cindy Perrault
2	MF	CMR	Naomi Eto
4	DF	FRA	Hélène Fercocq
5	DF	FRA	Maïwen Renard
6	MF	FRA	Agathe Donnary
7	FW	MAR	Imane Touriss
8	MF	MAR	Sana Daoudi
9	FW	NEP	Sabitra Bhandari
11	FW	FRA	Alison Peniguel
10	MF	FRA	Leïla Peneau
14	MF	FRA	Maëlle Seguin
15	DF	FRA	Lou Autin
16	GK	FRA	Laura Prieur

No.	Pos.	Nation	Player
18	FW	FRA	Adélie Fourré
19	DF	ALG	Sofia Guellati
20	MF	FRA	Inès Avenant
22	MF	FRA	Wassilah Pacaud
23	FW	FRA	Maïwenn Brezac
24	FW	FRA	Célia Aggoune
25	DF	FRA	Agathe Ollivier
28	FW	FRA	Lauraleen Le Lan
29	MF	FRA	Maureen Bigot
30	GK	FRA	Marie-Morgane Sieber
34	DF	FRA	Léane Lescop
40	GK	FRA	Lucie Vivier
—	MF	FIN	Aada Törrönen

=== Former internationals ===
- France: Camille Abily, Solène Durand, Anne Gouëzel, Françoise Jézéquel, Clarisse Le Bihan, Isabelle Le Boulch, Eugénie Le Sommer, Griedge Mbock Bathy, Mélissa Plaza
- Algeria: Marine Dafeur, Sofia Guellati
- Lebanon: Lili Iskandar
- Morocco: Sana Daoudi
- Nepal: Sabitra Bhandari
- Nigeria: Desire Oparanozie
- Tunisia: Leïla Maknoun

== Honours ==
=== Domestic ===
- Division 1 Féminine (level 1)
- Winners (1): 1988–89
