= ESOF Vendée La Roche-sur-Yon =

ESOF Vendée La Roche
- Full name: Etoile Sportive Ornaysienne de Football Vendée La Roche-sur-Yon
- Short name: ESOF La Roche
- Founded: 1978
- Ground: Stade de Saint-André-d'Ornay; La Roche-sur-Yon, France
- Capacity: 1,800
- Chairman: Laurent Grelier
- Manager: Malika Bousseau
- League: D3 Féminine
- 2024–25: 4th (Group A)
- Website: http://www.esofootball.net/
Home colours	Away colours

ESOF Vendée La Roche (Etoile Sportive Ornaysienne de Football Vendée La Roche-sur-Yon) is a French women's football club founded in 1978 and is based in La Roche-sur-Yon, in the Vendée department of the Pays de la Loire.

The women's football department, created in 1978, took part in the multi-group French championship in the 1986–1987 and 1991–1992 seasons.

Following the creation of a single-group top league in 1992, ESOF La Roche first played it in the 1996–1997 season. This was the golden era of the team, and in the 1998–1999 and 2000–2001 seasons it was the championship's runner-up, being close to being the first team to represent France in the UEFA Women's Cup.

From the next season the team fell to mid to low positions and in the 2003–2004 season it was relegated. It has since played in the top tier in the 2005–2006, 2006–2007, 2007–2008, 2009–2010, 2010–2011 and 2015–2016 seasons. In all these appearances it struggled to avoid relegation and its best result was the 2006–2007's ninth position, while in the national cup it has reached the quarterfinals in three occasions, most recently in the 2011–2012 season.

== Honours ==
=== Domestic ===
- Division 2 Féminine
  - Winners (3): 1994–95, 2004–05, 2008–09,

== 2024–2025 Squad ==
Note: Flags indicate national team as defined under FIFA eligibility rules; some limited exceptions apply. Players may hold more than one non-FIFA nationality.

No.	Pos.	Nation	Player
—	GK	FRA	Camille Nerbonne
—	DF	FRA	Salomé Alborbide Leboeuf
—	DF	FRA	Coralie Belin
—	DF	FRA	Maureen Cosson
—	DF	FRA	Adeline Coudrin
—	DF	FRA	Aline Liaigre
—	DF	FRA	Jessica Marchadié
—	DF	FRA	Claire Micheneau
—	DF	FRA	Cécilie Neau
—	DF	FRA	Mélanie Roux
—	MF	FRA	Charlotte Boisneau

No.	Pos.	Nation	Player
—	MF	FRA	Charlotte Lemarchand
—	MF	FRA	Audrey Nicolas
—	MF	FRA	Claire Paillat
—	MF	FRA	Julie Pasquereau
—	MF	FRA	Anaïs Pugnetti
—	MF	FRA	Laurie Teinturier
—	MF	FRA	Juliette Vrignaud
—	FW	FRA	Eloïse Chabrat
—	FW	FRA	Caroline Deluca
—	FW	FRA	Lisa Fragoli
—	FW	FRA	Claire Guillard
—	FW	FRA	Charlotte Peslerbe
—	FW	FRA	Hilda Ravon

== Former notable players ==
- Camille Abily
- Sonia Bompastor
- Alexandra Guiné
- Elodie Jacq
- Hoda Lattaf
- Melissa Plaza
