= 2015–16 in French football =

Football in France
- Season: 2015–16

Men's football
- Ligue 1: Paris Saint-Germain
- Ligue 2: Nancy
- Championnat National: Strasbourg
- Coupe de France: Paris Saint-Germain
- Coupe de la Ligue: Paris Saint-Germain
- Trophée des Champions: Paris Saint-Germain

Women's football
- Division 1: Lyon
- Coupe de France: Lyon

The following article is a summary of the 2015–16 football season in France, which was the 82nd season of competitive football in the country and ran from July 2015 to June 2016.

== League table ==
=== Ligue 1 ===
Pos	Team	Pld	W	D	L	GF	GA	GD	Pts	Qualification or relegation
1	Paris Saint-Germain (C)	38	30	6	2	102	19	+83	96	Qualification for the Champions League group stage
2	Lyon	38	19	8	11	67	43	+24	65	Qualification for the Champions League group stage
3	Monaco	38	17	14	7	57	50	+7	65	Qualification for the Champions League third qualifying round
4	Nice	38	18	9	11	58	41	+17	63	Qualification for the Europa League group stage (Note: Since the winners of the 2015–16 Coupe de France and the 2015–16 Coupe de la Ligue, Paris Saint-Germain, qualified for European competition based on their league position, the spot awarded to the Coupe de France winners (Europa League group stage) was passed to the fourth-placed team and the spot awarded to the Coupe de la Ligue winners (Europa League third qualifying round) was passed to the sixth-placed team. The fifth-placed team received the spot in Europa League third qualifying round originally designated to the fourth-placed team.)
5	Lille	38	15	15	8	39	27	+12	60	Qualification for the Europa League third qualifying round
6	Saint-Étienne	38	17	7	14	42	37	+5	58	Qualification for the Europa League third qualifying round
7	Caen	38	16	6	16	39	52	−13	54	
8	Rennes	38	13	13	12	52	54	−2	52	
9	Angers	38	13	11	14	40	38	+2	50	
10	Bastia	38	14	8	16	36	42	−6	50	
11	Bordeaux	38	12	14	12	50	57	−7	50	
12	Montpellier	38	14	7	17	49	47	+2	49	
13	Marseille	38	10	18	10	48	42	+6	48	
14	Nantes	38	12	12	14	33	44	−11	48	
15	Lorient	38	11	13	14	47	58	−11	46	
16	Guingamp	38	11	11	16	47	56	−9	44	
17	Toulouse	38	9	13	16	45	55	−10	40	
18	Reims (R)	38	10	9	19	44	57	−13	39	Relegation to Ligue 2 (Note: Starting this season, Ligue 1 decided to reduce the number of relegation spots from three to two. However, the decision was appealed and overturned so three teams were relegated.)
19	Gazélec Ajaccio (R)	38	8	13	17	37	58	−21	37	Relegation to Ligue 2
20	Troyes (R)	38	3	9	26	28	83	−55	18	Relegation to Ligue 2

Source: Ligue 1, Soccerway
Rules for classification: 1) Points; 2) Goal difference; 3) Goals scored; 4) Head-to-head points; 5) Head-to-head goal difference; 6) Fairplay ranking.
(C) Champions; (R) Relegated

=== Ligue 2 ===
Pos	Team	Pld	W	D	L	GF	GA	GD	Pts	Promotion or Relegation
1	Nancy (C, P)	38	21	11	6	60	32	+28	74	Promotion to Ligue 1
2	Dijon (P)	38	20	10	8	62	36	+26	70	Promotion to Ligue 1
3	Metz (P)	38	19	8	11	54	39	+15	65	Promotion to Ligue 1
4	Le Havre	38	19	8	11	52	37	+15	65	
5	Red Star	38	18	10	10	43	38	+5	64	
6	Lens	38	15	13	10	39	35	+4	58	
7	Clermont Foot	38	16	10	12	56	53	+3	58	
8	Auxerre	38	15	10	13	47	46	+1	55	
9	Tours	38	11	14	13	36	41	−5	47	
10	Brest	38	12	11	15	34	41	−7	47	
11	Bourg-en-Bresse	38	13	8	17	47	59	−12	47	
12	Valenciennes	38	10	14	14	39	43	−4	44	
13	Laval	38	9	17	12	35	42	−7	44	
14	Nîmes (Note: Nîmes was docked 8 points for match fixing in the 2013–14 season.)	38	13	12	13	50	52	−2	43	
15	Sochaux	38	9	15	14	34	36	−2	42	
16	Niort	38	8	18	12	38	45	−7	42	
17	Ajaccio	38	9	15	14	34	42	−8	42	
18	Evian (Note: Evian was demoted due to financial difficulties.) (R, D)	38	9	12	17	41	41	0	39	Demotion to Division d'Honneur Régionale
19	Créteil (R)	38	8	10	20	42	66	−24	34	Relegation to Championnat National
20	Paris FC (R)	38	4	18	16	32	51	−19	30	Relegation to Championnat National

Source: Ligue 2
Rules for classification: 1) points; 2) goal difference; 3) number of goals scored; 4) head-to-head goal difference; 5) fair play points
(C) Champions; (D) Disqualified; (P) Promoted; (R) Relegated

=== Championnat National ===
Pos	Team	Pld	W	D	L	GF	GA	GD	Pts	Promotion or Relegation
1	Strasbourg (C, P)	34	15	13	6	35	19	+16	58	Promotion to Ligue 2
2	Orléans (P)	34	14	14	6	50	37	+13	56	Promotion to Ligue 2
3	Amiens (P)	34	14	13	7	44	35	+9	55	Promotion to Ligue 2
4	Marseille Consolat	34	15	9	10	50	43	+7	54	
5	Châteauroux	34	14	10	10	52	45	+7	52	
6	Dunkerque	34	12	11	11	42	42	0	47	
7	Avranches	34	10	16	8	44	36	+8	46	
8	Boulogne	34	12	10	12	50	45	+5	46	
9	Chambly	34	11	11	12	46	40	+6	44	
10	Béziers	34	11	11	12	35	38	−3	44	
11	Luçon (Note: Luçon resigned due to financial difficulties. Les Herbiers was reprieved from relegation.) (D, R)	34	11	11	12	45	50	−5	44	Demotion to Division d'Honneur
12	Sedan	34	10	13	11	31	34	−3	43	
13	CA Bastia	34	10	13	11	29	33	−4	43	
14	Belfort	34	9	14	11	26	32	−6	41	
15	Les Herbiers	34	8	15	11	44	51	−7	39	
16	Colmar (Note: Colmar was assigned to Division d'Honneur (6th tier) after filing for insolvency. Épinal was reprieved from relegation.) (D, R, R)	34	10	9	15	39	46	−7	37	Demotion to Division d'Honneur
17	Épinal	34	6	12	16	39	53	−14	30	
18	Fréjus Saint-Raphaël (R)	34	4	15	15	22	44	−22	27	Relegation to Championnat de France Amateur

Source: foot-national.com
Rules for classification: 1) points; 2) head-to-head results; 3) head-to-head goal difference; 4) goal difference; 5) number of goals scored; 6) fair play points; 7) draw
(C) Champions; (D) Disqualified; (P) Promoted; (R) Relegated

=== Championnat de France Amateur ===
Group A
Pos	Team	Pld	Pts
1	Quevilly-Rouen (C)	30	92
2	IC Croix	30	85
3	Poissy	30	82
4	L'Entente SSG	30	76
5	Arras FA	30	71
6	AC Amiens	30	70
7	Paris Saint-Germain (res)	30	70
8	Mantes	30	69
9	Calais RUFC	30	68
10	Boulogne-Billancourt	30	68
11	Dieppe	30	67
12	Wasquehal	30	66
13	Lens (res)	30	66
14	Troyes (res) (R)	30	65
15	Aubervilliers (R)	30	54
16	Roye Noyon (R)	30	51

Source: FFF.fr
(C) Champions;
(R) Relegated

Group B
Pos	Team	Pld	Pts
1	Lyon-Duchère (C)	30	92
2	Grenoble	30	89
3	Auxerre (res)	30	79
4	Lyon (res)	30	77
5	Villefranche	30	73
6	Jura Sud	30	73
7	Drancy	30	71
8	St-Louis Neuweg	30	70
9	Monts d'Or	30	68
10	Mulhouse	30	67
11	Yzeure	30	66
12	Le Puy Foot	30	62
13	Montceau	30	62
14	Sarre-Union (R)	30	58
15	Sochaux (res) (R)	30	54
16	Moulins (X)	30	0

Updated to match(es) played on 4 June 2016.
Source: FFF.fr
(C) Champions;
(R) Relegated;
(X) Relegated and points expunged

Group C
Pos	Team	Pld	Pts
1	Pau (C)	28	86
2	Colomiers	28	76
3	Monaco (res)	28	74
4	Nice (res)	28	73
5	Stade Montois	28	71
6	Marignane	28	65
7	Martigues	28	65
8	Hyères	28	64
9	Marseille (res)	28	62
10	Tarbes	28	62
11	Toulon-Le Las	28	62
12	Le Pontet	28	62
13	Sète	28	60
14	Rodez	28	59
15	Bayonne (R)	28	48
16	Arles (D)	0	0

Source: FFF.fr
(C) Champions;
(D) Record expunged due to dissolution.;
(R) Relegated

Group D
Pos	Team	Pld	Pts
1	Concarneau (C)	30	86
2	Saint-Malo	30	85
3	Romorantin	30	84
4	Bergerac	30	82
5	Cholet	30	74
6	Lorient (res)	30	74
7	Châteaubriant	30	73
8	Fleury-Mérogis	30	71
9	Trélissac	30	69
10	Vendée Fontenay	30	65
11	Nantes (res)	30	65
12	Stade Plabennécois	30	64
13	Viry	30	61
14	Vitré	30	60
15	Stade Bordelais (R)	30	55
16	Bordeaux (res) (R)	30	52

Source: FFF.fr
(C) Champions;
(R) Relegated
