= Norway at the FIFA Women's World Cup =

The Norway women's national football team has represented Norway at the FIFA Women's World Cup on nine occasions in 1991, 1995, 1999, 2003, 2007, 2011, 2015, 2019 and 2023. They were runners up in 1991. They won the following tournament in 1995. They also reached the fourth place in 1999 and in 2007.

== 1991 World Cup ==
Lineups in Women's World Cup Finals

Norway had five wins and a draw in the European Championship qualification. In the quarter-final against Hungary they won 2–1 at home, followed by 0–2 away. In the European Championship finals, Denmark was defeated after scoreless 100 minutes (the regular game time was 2 × 40 minutes at that time) – on a penalty shootout. The final against Germany also went into extra time, in which the Germans won 3–1.

In the People's Republic of China Norway was in the group with the host, Denmark and New Zealand. In the first game they lost 0–4 against the Chinese women. The second game against New Zealand was won 4–0. Linda Medalen was the first Norwegian to score a World Cup goal following an own goal by Terry McCahill. In the match for second place of the group they defeated the Danes 2–1 and thus reached the quarter-finals. Opponents in the quarter-finals were then the Italians. Norway took the lead twice, but the Italians equalized in extra time. The final score was 3–2 to Norway. In the semifinals against Sweden the Norwegians won 4–1 in the final. Final opponents were the United States, who had previously won all matches. Although Linda Medalen was able to equalize the United States's lead with her sixth goal, Michelle Akers secured the US Women's 2–1 victory with her second final goal.

=== Group A ===
Pos	Team	Pld	W	D	L	GF	GA	GD	Pts	Qualification
1	China (H)	3	2	1	0	10	3	+7	5	Advance to knockout stage
2	Norway	3	2	0	1	6	5	+1	4	Advance to knockout stage
3	Denmark	3	1	1	1	6	4	+2	3	Advance to knockout stage
4	New Zealand	3	0	0	3	1	11	−10	0	

Source: FIFA
(H) Hosts
16 November 1991
20:45

China	4–0	Norway
Ma Li 22'; Liu Ailing 45', 50'; Sun Qingmei 75'	Report

Tianhe Stadium, Guangzhou
Attendance: 65,000
Referee: Salvador Imperatore (Chile)

19 November 1991
15:30

Norway	4–0	New Zealand
McCahill 30' (o.g.); Medalen 32', 38'; Riise 49'	Report

Guangdong Provincial Stadium, Guangzhou
Attendance: 12,000
Referee: Salvador Imperatore (Chile)

21 November 1991
19:45

Norway	2–1	Denmark
Svensson 14' (pen.); Medalen 56'	Report	Thychosen 54' (pen.)

Ying Tung Stadium, Guangzhou
Attendance: 15,500
Referee: Vadim Zhuk (Soviet Union)

=== Quarter-finals ===
24 November 1991
19:45

Norway	3–2 (a.e.t.)	Italy
Hegstad 22'; Carlsen 67'; Svensson 96' (pen.)	Report	Salmaso 31'; Guarino 80'

Jiangmen Stadium, Jiangmen
Attendance: 13,000
Referee: Rafael Rodríguez Medina (El Salvador)

=== Semi-finals ===
27 November 1991
15:30

Sweden	1–4	Norway
Videkull 6'	Report	Svensson 39' (pen.); Medalen 41', 77'; Carlsen 67'

Ying Tung Stadium, Guangzhou
Attendance: 16,000
Referee: Jim McCluskey (Scotland)

=== Final ===
30 November 1991
19:45

Norway	1–2	United States
Medalen 29'	Report	Akers-Stahl 20', 78'

Tianhe Stadium, Guangzhou
Attendance: 63,000
Referee: Vadim Zhuk (Soviet Union)

== 1995 World Cup ==
For the World Cup in the neighboring country the Norwegians qualified as semi-finalist of the European Championship 1995. In the Qualification, Norway won five wins and a draw against Finland, Hungary and Czech Republic. In the quarter-finals, Norway prevailed with two wins against Italy and was thus qualified for the World Cup. In the semi-final they won the first leg against Sweden 4: 3, but lost in Sweden with 1: 4.

At the World Cup in Sweden, they met in the first match Nigeria and won 8–0. A 2–0 win over England followed by a 7–0 win over World Cup rookie Canada. In the quarter-final against Denmark, they then had to accept the 3–1 first goal. In the semifinals, there was then a rematch for the previous World Cup final. This time, the Norwegians had the better end for themselves and won 1–0. Thus, the United States had lost a World Cup match for the first time. Final opponent was Germany and in the pouring rain, Hege Riise and Marianne Pettersen made the decision for the Norwegians shortly before half-time. This was Norway for the first time world champion. Already with the entry into the quarterfinals, Norway had also qualified for the first women's football tournament at the Olympic Games 1996 in which only the eight best teams of the World Cup could participate.

=== Group B ===
Pos	Team	Pld	W	D	L	GF	GA	GD	Pts	Qualification
1	Norway	3	3	0	0	17	0	+17	9	Advance to knockout stage
2	England	3	2	0	1	6	6	0	6	Advance to knockout stage
3	Canada	3	0	1	2	5	13	−8	1	
4	Nigeria	3	0	1	2	5	14	−9	1	

Source: FIFA
6 June 1995
19:00

Norway	8–0	Nigeria
Sandberg 30', 44', 82'; Riise 49'; Aarønes 60', 90'; Medalen 67'; Svensson 76' (pen.)	Report

Tingvalla IP, Karlstad
Attendance: 4,344
Referee: Alain Hamer (Luxembourg)

8 June 1995
19:00

Norway	2–0	England
Haugen 7'; Riise 37'	Report

Tingvalla IP, Karlstad
Attendance: 5,520
Referee: Eduardo Gamboa (Chile)

10 June 1995
16:00

Norway	7–0	Canada
Aarønes 4', 21', 90+3'; Riise 12'; Pettersen 71', 89'; Leinan 84'	Report

Strömvallen, Gävle
Attendance: 2,715
Referee: Maria Edilene Siqueira (Brazil)

=== Quarter-finals ===
13 June 1995
17:15

Norway	3–1	Denmark
Espeseth 21'; Medalen 64'; Riise 85'	Report	Krogh 86'

Tingvalla IP, Karlstad
Attendance: 4,655
Referee: Pirom Un-prasert (Thailand)

=== Semi-finals ===
15 June 1995
17:15

United States	0–1	Norway
	Report	Aarønes 10'

Arosvallen, Västerås
Attendance: 2,893
Referee: Alain Hamer (Luxembourg)

=== Final ===
18 June 1995
18:00

Germany	0–2	Norway
	Report	Riise 37'; Pettersen 40'

Råsunda Stadium, Solna
Attendance: 17,158
Referee: Ingrid Jonsson (Sweden)

== 1999 World Cup ==
Unlike the men's World Cup, where the defending champion was automatically qualified until 2002, the defending champion had to qualify for the women's second World Cup. For the third World Cup, UEFA then set up separate qualifiers for the first time and to date the only continental association. In the qualification, Norway met the final opponent of 1995 as well as the Netherlands and England. With four wins, a draw and a defeat in Germany, Norway took first place with one point ahead of Germany and qualified directly for the World Cup. Germany, which had lost except in Norway also in the Netherlands, qualified for the playoffs of the runners-up against Ukraine also for the World Cup finals.

In the US, the Norwegians won their opening game against World Cup newcomer Russia with 2: 1. Against Canada followed then a 7: 1 and against Japan a 4–0. In the quarter-finals Sweden was again the opponent and Norway reached the semi-finals with a 3–1 win for the third time in a row. There, China was superior and won 5–0. The match for the third place match against Brazil was scoreless for 90 minutes. Due to the subsequent final, no extra time was played and immediately a penalty shoot-out set, which Brazil won 5: 4. Fourth, however, Norway had qualified for the women's football tournament at the Olympic Games 2000 alongside the host Australia only the seven best teams in the World Cup could participate. There Norway then won the Olympic gold medal and became the second team after the USA, which was both continental champion, world champion and Olympic champion.

=== Group C ===
Pos	Team	Pld	W	D	L	GF	GA	GD	Pts	Qualification
1	Norway	3	3	0	0	13	2	+11	9	Advance to knockout stage
2	Russia	3	2	0	1	10	3	+7	6	Advance to knockout stage
3	Canada	3	0	1	2	3	12	−9	1	
4	Japan	3	0	1	2	1	10	−9	1	

Source: FIFA

June 20, 1999
16:00 EDT (UTC−4)

Norway	2–1	Russia
Sandaune 28'; Pettersen 68'	Report	Komarova 78'

Foxboro Stadium, Foxborough
Attendance: 14,873
Referee: Zuo Xiudi (China PR)

June 23, 1999
18:00 EDT (UTC−4)

Norway	7–1	Canada
Aarønes 8', 36'; Lehn 49'; Riise 54'; Medalen 62'; Pettersen 76'; S. Gulbrandsen 87'	Report	Hooper 31'

Jack Kent Cooke Stadium, Landover
Attendance: 16,448
Referee: Tammy Ogston (Australia)

June 26, 1999
18:30 CDT (UTC−5)

Norway	4–0	Japan
Riise 8' (pen.); Isozaki 26' (o.g.); Aarønes 36'; Mellgren 61'	Report

Soldier Field, Chicago
Attendance: 34,256
Referee: Marisela Contreras (Venezuela)

=== Quarter-finals ===
June 30, 1999
19:30 PDT (UTC−7)

Norway	3–1	Sweden
Aarønes 51'; Pettersen 58'; Riise 72' (pen.)	Report	Moström 90+1'

Spartan Stadium, San Jose
Attendance: 21,411
Referee: Im Eun-ju (South Korea)

=== Semi-finals ===
July 4, 1999
19:30 EDT (UTC−4)

Norway	0–5	China
	Report	Sun Wen 3', 72' (pen.); Liu Ailing 14', 51'; Fan Yunjie 65'

Foxboro Stadium, Foxborough
Attendance: 28,986
Referee: Sonia Denoncourt (Canada)

=== Third place play-off ===
July 10, 1999
10:15 PDT (UTC−7)

Brazil	0–0 (a.e.t.)	Norway
	Report
Penalties
Pretinha (penalty missed); Cidinha (penalty scored); Kátia (penalty scored); Maycon (penalty scored); Nenê (penalty scored); Formiga (penalty scored)	5–4	(penalty scored) Riise; (penalty scored) Pettersen; (penalty missed) Jørgensen; (penalty scored) Sandaune; (penalty scored) S. Gulbrandsen; (penalty missed) Aarønes

Rose Bowl, Pasadena
Attendance: 90,185
Referee: Im Eun-ju (South Korea)

== 2003 World Cup ==
Actually, the 2003 World Cup should take place again in People's Republic of China. Due to the SARS epidemic, the tournament was temporarily relocated to the United States. Thus the World Cup took place for the second time in the USA. In the Qualification, Norway met France, Ukraine and the Czech Republic. With five wins and a draw, Norway qualified as group winners for the World Cup. The second-placed French also succeeded in the playoffs of the group second qualifying by a 2–0 and a 1–1 draw against Denmark.

In the USA, they met again in the first group match on the qualification opponents France and won 2–0. They then lost to Brazil 4–1 but lost 7–1 to South Korea's South Korea to reach the quarter-finals as group winners. Here again the USA were the opponents and after a 0: 1 was not reached the semi-final for the first time. In this case, the United States but then failed to Germany, so that they could not defend their title. With the quarter-finals, Norway had also missed the qualification for the women's football tournament at the Olympic Games alongside the host Greece only the two best European Teams of the World Cup could participate, which Norway had no chance to defend the title as Olympic champion.

=== Group B ===
Pos	Team	Pld	W	D	L	GF	GA	GD	Pts	Qualification
1	Brazil	3	2	1	0	8	2	+6	7	Advance to knockout stage
2	Norway	3	2	0	1	10	5	+5	6	Advance to knockout stage
3	France	3	1	1	1	2	3	−1	4	
4	South Korea	3	0	0	3	1	11	−10	0	

Source: FIFA
September 20, 2003
12:00 EDT (UTC−4)

Norway	2–0	France
Rapp 47'; Mellgren 66'	Report

Lincoln Financial Field, Philadelphia
Attendance: 24,347
Referee: Kari Seitz (United States)

September 24, 2003
17:00 EDT (UTC−4)

Norway	1–4	Brazil
Pettersen 45'	Report	Daniela 26'; Rosana 37'; Marta 59'; Kátia 68'

Robert F. Kennedy Memorial Stadium, Washington, D.C.
Attendance: 16,316
Referee: Xonam Agboyi (Togo)

September 27, 2003
12:45 EDT (UTC−4)

South Korea	1–7	Norway
Kim Jin-hee 75'	Report	Gulbrandsen 5'; Mellgren 24', 31'; Pettersen 40'; Sandaune 52'; Ørmen 80', 90'

Gillette Stadium, Foxborough
Attendance: 14,356
Referee: Tammy Ogston (Australia)

=== Quarter-finals ===
October 1, 2003
19:30 EDT (UTC−4)

United States	1–0	Norway
Wambach 24'	Report

Gillette Stadium, Foxborough
Attendance: 25,103
Referee: Nicole Petignat (Switzerland)

== 2007 World Cup ==
Four years later, the World Cup took place for the second time in the People's Republic of China. In the Qualification, Norway met Ukraine, Italy, Serbia and Greece. With seven wins and a draw, the Norwegians prevailed sovereign.

In the first game of the final they met Canada. After two high wins in previous finals, only 2–1 was enough and only 1–1 in the second game against Australia. However, Ghana were followed by a 7–2, with Ragnhild Gulbrandsen alone scoring three goals. Norway were group winners and met host China in the quarter-finals. With 1: 0, the Norwegians could retaliate for the semi-final defeat eight years earlier and move into the semifinals. Here they met defending champion Germany and lost 0–3. Germany was then able to win the final against Brazil and be the first team to defend the world title and remain without conceding in the tournament. Norway, however, lost the third/fourth place play-off against the United States with 1: 4 and thus for the first time in a World Cup three games. However, with the semi-final draw, Norway had secured the qualification for the women's football tournament at the Olympic Games, which was only attended by the three best European teams in the World Cup.

=== Group C ===
Pos	Team	Pld	W	D	L	GF	GA	GD	Pts	Qualification
1	Norway	3	2	1	0	10	4	+6	7	Advance to knockout stage
2	Australia	3	1	2	0	7	4	+3	5	Advance to knockout stage
3	Canada	3	1	1	1	7	4	+3	4	
4	Ghana	3	0	0	3	3	15	−12	0	

Source: FIFA
12 September 2007
20:00

Norway	2–1	Canada
R. Gulbrandsen 52'; Stangeland Horpestad 81'	Report	Chapman 33'

Yellow Dragon Stadium, Hangzhou
Attendance: 30,752
Referee: Christine Beck (Germany)

15 September 2007
20:00

Australia	1–1	Norway
De Vanna 83'	Report	R. Gulbrandsen 5'

Yellow Dragon Stadium, Hangzhou
Attendance: 33,835
Referee: Niu Huijun (China PR)

20 September 2007
17:00

Norway	7–2	Ghana
Storløkken 4'; R. Gulbrandsen 39', 59', 62'; Stangeland Horpestad 45' (pen.); Herlovsen 56'; Klaveness 69'	Report	Bayor 73'; Okoe 80' (pen.)

Yellow Dragon Stadium, Hangzhou
Attendance: 43,817
Referee: Jennifer Bennett (United States)

=== Quarter-finals ===
23 September 2007
17:00

Norway	1–0	China
Herlovsen 32'	Report

Wuhan Sports Centre Stadium, Wuhan
Attendance: 52,000
Referee: Gyöngyi Gaál (Hungary)

=== Semi-finals ===
26 September 2007
20:00

Germany	3–0	Norway
Rønning 42' (o.g.); Stegemann 72'; Müller 75'	Report

Tianjin Olympic Center Stadium, Tianjin
Attendance: 53,819
Referee: Dagmar Damková (Czech Republic)

=== Third place play-off ===
30 September 2007
17:00

Norway	1–4	United States
R. Gulbrandsen 63'	Report	Wambach 30', 46'; Chalupny 58'; O'Reilly 59'

Hongkou Football Stadium, Shanghai
Attendance: 31,000
Referee: Gyöngyi Gaál (Hungary)

== 2011 World Cup ==
For the World Cup in Germany qualifying the Norwegians won with seven wins and a draw against the Netherlands, Belarus, Slovakia and Macedonia. It Isabell Herlovsen in the 14–0 victory over Macedonia six goals. With the 4: 0 on the penultimate round in Slovakia, Norway qualified ahead of schedule for the play-offs of the group winners, which were necessary this time. With 1: 0 and 2: 0 Ukraine was defeated and booked the ticket to the World Cup.

In Germany, Norway was wound up in a group with World Cup freshman Equatorial Guinea, runner-up Brazil and Australia. In the first game against the World Cup newcomer, the Norwegians did a long time hard and came only in the 84th minute to redeeming 1: 0, which then remained. Against Brazil followed then a 0–3 defeat. The final game against Australia was then for second place. Although Norway went 1–0 in the 56th minute, but had to accept the postponed compensation. As the Australians had the better goal difference, this draw was enough for them to move into the quarter-finals, so Norway pushed for the winner, but had to accept the 1: 2 in the 87th minute and could not compensate this. Thus Norway dropped out for the first time in the preliminary round and thus could not qualify for the women's football tournament at the Olympic Games 2012 in which only the two best European teams in the World Cup and Britain could participate as hosts. Group winners Brazil and Australia failed but both in the quarterfinals.

=== Group D ===
Pos	Team	Pld	W	D	L	GF	GA	GD	Pts	Qualification
1	Brazil	3	3	0	0	7	0	+7	9	Advance to knockout stage
2	Australia	3	2	0	1	5	4	+1	6	Advance to knockout stage
3	Norway	3	1	0	2	2	5	−3	3	
4	Equatorial Guinea	3	0	0	3	2	7	−5	0	

Source: FIFA
29 June 2011
15:00

Norway	1–0	Equatorial Guinea
Haavi 84'	Report

Impuls Arena, Augsburg
Attendance: 12,928
Referee: Quetzalli Alvarado (Mexico)

3 July 2011
18:15

Brazil	3–0	Norway
Marta 22', 48'; Rosana 46'	Report

Volkswagen Arena, Wolfsburg
Attendance: 26,067
Referee: Kari Seitz (United States)

6 July 2011
18:00

Australia	2–1	Norway
Simon 57', 87'	Report	Thorsnes 56'

BayArena, Leverkusen
Attendance: 18,474
Referee: Estela Álvarez (Argentina)

== 2015 World Cup ==
In the Qualification the Norwegians prevail again. In the group were the Netherlands, who qualified for the World Cup for the first time through the playoffs, Belgium, Portugal, Greece and for the first time Albania the opponents. After nine victories Norway was qualified on 13 September 2014 as the third European team for the World Cup finals. The last game against the Netherlands was then lost, but could be countered, as the Netherlands had come in the home game against Belgium only to a 1: 1.

In the draw of the groups, the Norwegians were not set and were the group B with Germany against which they had lost the last European Championship final ,Other group opponents included the World Cup newcomers Thailand and the Ivory Coast.

In the group they prevailed sovereign and was only because of the worse goal difference behind Germany second. In the second round Norway lost 1: 2 against England. Norway missed out on qualifying for the Women's Football Tournament at the 2016 Olympic Games, but still had the chance to win the third European Olympic ticket in play-offs against the three other European knockout fans, National coach Pellerud resigned from his post in August, believing the chances of qualifying for the Olympics were higher without him. These were missed in March 2016, when it was enough for only one win and two defeats and thus only the disappointing 4th place.

=== Group B ===
Pos	Team	Pld	W	D	L	GF	GA	GD	Pts	Qualification
1	Germany	3	2	1	0	15	1	+14	7	Advance to knockout stage
2	Norway	3	2	1	0	8	2	+6	7	Advance to knockout stage
3	Thailand	3	1	0	2	3	10	−7	3	
4	Ivory Coast	3	0	0	3	3	16	−13	0	

Source: FIFA
7 June 2015
13:00 EDT (UTC−4)

Norway	4–0	Thailand
Rønning 15'; Herlovsen 29', 34'; Hegerberg 68'	Report

TD Place Stadium, Ottawa
Attendance: 20,953
Referee: Anna-Marie Keighley (New Zealand)

11 June 2015
16:00 EDT (UTC−4)

Germany	1–1	Norway
Mittag 6'	Report	Mjelde 61'

TD Place Stadium, Ottawa
Attendance: 18,987
Referee: Teodora Albon (Romania)

15 June 2015
17:00 ADT (UTC−3)

Ivory Coast	1–3	Norway
N'Guessan 71'	Report	Hegerberg 6', 62'; Gulbrandsen 67'

Moncton Stadium, Moncton
Attendance: 7,147
Referee: Salomé di Iorio (Argentina)

=== Round of 16 ===
22 June 2015
17:00 EDT (UTC−4)

Norway	1–2	England
Gulbrandsen 54'	Report	Houghton 61'; Bronze 76'

TD Place Stadium, Ottawa
Attendance: 19,829
Referee: Esther Staubli (Switzerland)

== 2019 World Cup ==
In the Qualification for the world cup, the team had to face European champions Netherlands, Ireland, Slovakia and Northern Ireland. After victories against Northern Ireland and Slovakia, the Norwegians lost 0–1 in the Netherlands. After that, they won all matches, including on the final day of the home game against the Netherlands 2–1. Although this was the direct comparison by the more away away goals for the Dutch women, but since they had come in November at home to Ireland only a goalless draw, they had – although they won all other games – in the end two points less than the Norwegians, which thus achieved the direct qualification.

Group opponents in France were the hosts as well as Nigeria and South Korea. The Norwegians started 3–0 against Nigeria, losing 2–1 to France and securing second place with a 2–1 win against South Korea. In the last sixteen they met Australia. As it was 1: 1 after 120 minutes, it came to the penalty shoot-out, the Norwegians won 4: 1. In the quarter-final against England they came in the third minute in arrears and conceded shortly before the break, the second goal. In the second half, they could not take advantage of several opportunities, but instead collected the third goal. The departure did not qualify them for the 2020 Olympics.

=== Group A ===
Pos	Team	Pld	W	D	L	GF	GA	GD	Pts	Qualification
1	France (H)	3	3	0	0	7	1	+6	9	Advance to knockout stage
2	Norway	3	2	0	1	6	3	+3	6	Advance to knockout stage
3	Nigeria	3	1	0	2	2	4	−2	3	Advance to knockout stage
4	South Korea	3	0	0	3	1	8	−7	0	

Source: FIFA
(H) Hosts
8 June 2019
21:00

Norway	3–0	Nigeria
Reiten 17'; Utland 34'; Ohale 37' (o.g.)	Report

Stade Auguste-Delaune, Reims
Attendance: 11,058
Referee: Kate Jacewicz (Australia)

12 June 2019
21:00

France	2–1	Norway
Gauvin 46'; Le Sommer 72' (pen.)	Report	Renard 54' (o.g.)

Allianz Riviera, Nice
Attendance: 34,872
Referee: Bibiana Steinhaus (Germany)

17 June 2019
21:00

South Korea	1–2	Norway
Yeo Min-ji 78'	Report	Graham Hansen 5' (pen.); Herlovsen 51' (pen.)

Stade Auguste-Delaune, Reims
Attendance: 13,034
Referee: Marie-Soleil Beaudoin (Canada)

=== Round of 16 ===
22 June 2019
21:00

Norway	1–1 (a.e.t.)	Australia
Herlovsen 31'	Report	Kellond-Knight 83'
Penalties
Graham Hansen (penalty scored); Reiten (penalty scored); Mjelde (penalty scored); Syrstad Engen (penalty scored)	4–1	(penalty missed) Kerr; (penalty missed) Gielnik; (penalty scored) Catley

Allianz Riviera, Nice
Attendance: 12,229
Referee: Riem Hussein (Germany)

=== Quarter-finals ===
27 June 2019
21:00

Norway	0–3	England
	Report	Scott 3'; White 40'; Bronze 57'

Stade Océane, Le Havre
Attendance: 21,111
Referee: Lucila Venegas (Mexico)

== 2023 World Cup ==
=== Group A ===
Pos	Team	Pld	W	D	L	GF	GA	GD	Pts	Qualification
1	Switzerland	3	1	2	0	2	0	+2	5	Advance to knockout stage
2	Norway	3	1	1	1	6	1	+5	4	Advance to knockout stage
3	New Zealand (H)	3	1	1	1	1	1	0	4	
4	Philippines	3	1	0	2	1	8	−7	3	

Source: FIFA
Rules for classification: Group stage tiebreakers
(H) Hosts
20 July 2023
19:00 UTC+12

New Zealand	1–0	Norway
Wilkinson 48'	Report

Eden Park, Auckland
Attendance: 42,137
Referee: Yoshimi Yamashita (Japan)

25 July 2023
20:00 UTC+12

Switzerland	0–0	Norway
	Report

Waikato Stadium, Hamilton
Attendance: 10,769
Referee: Stéphanie Frappart (France)

30 July 2023
19:00 UTC+12

Norway	6–0	Philippines
Román Haug 6', 17', 90+5'; Graham Hansen 31'; Barker 48' (o.g.); Reiten 53' (pen.)	Report

Eden Park, Auckland
Attendance: 34,697
Referee: Marie-Soleil Beaudoin (Canada)

=== Round of 16 ===
5 August 2023
20:00 UTC+12

Japan	3–1	Norway
Syrstad Engen 15' (o.g.); Shimizu 50'; Miyazawa 81'	Report	Reiten 20'

Wellington Regional Stadium, Wellington
Attendance: 33,042
Referee: Edina Alves Batista (Brazil)

== FIFA World Cup record ==
Year	Result	Pld	W	D*	L	GF	GA
(China) 1991	Runners-up	6	4	0	2	14	10
(Sweden) 1995	Champions	6	6	0	0	23	1
(United States) 1999	Fourth Place	6	4	1	1	16	8
(United States) 2003	Quarter-finals	4	2	0	2	10	6
(China) 2007	Fourth Place	6	3	1	2	12	11
(Germany) 2011	Group stage	3	1	0	2	2	5
(Canada) 2015	Round of 16	4	2	1	1	9	4
(France) 2019	Quarter-finals	5	2	1	2	7	7
(Australia) (New Zealand) 2023	Round of 16	4	1	1	2	7	4
(Brazil) 2027	Qualification in progress						
(Costa Rica) (Jamaica) (Mexico) (United States) 2031	To be determined						
(United Kingdom) 2035	To be determined						
Total	9/12	44	25	5	14	100	56

FIFA Women's World Cup history
Year	Round	Date	Opponent	Result	Stadium
(China) 1991	Group stage	16 November	China	L 0–4	Tianhe Stadium, Guangzhou
(China) 1991	Group stage	19 November	New Zealand	W 4–0	Guangdong Provincial Stadium, Guangzhou
(China) 1991	Group stage	21 November	Denmark	W 2–1	Ying Dong Stadium, Panyu
(China) 1991	Quarter-finals	24 November	Italy	W 3–2	Jiangmen Stadium, Jiangmen
(China) 1991	Semi-finals	27 November	Sweden	W 4–1	Ying Dong Stadium, Panyu
(China) 1991	Final	30 November	United States	L 1–2	Tianhe Stadium, Guangzhou
(Sweden) 1995	Group stage	6 June	Nigeria	W 8–0	Tingvallen, Karlstad
(Sweden) 1995	Group stage	8 June	England	W 2–0	Tingvallen, Karlstad
(Sweden) 1995	Group stage	10 June	Canada	W 7–0	Strömvallen, Gävle
(Sweden) 1995	Quarter-finals	13 June	Denmark	W 3–1	Tingvallen, Karlstad
(Sweden) 1995	Semi-finals	15 June	United States	W 1–0	Arosvallen, Västerås
(Sweden) 1995	Final	18 June	Germany	W 2–0	Råsunda Stadium, Solna
(United States) 1999	Group stage	20 June	Russia	W 2–1	Foxboro Stadium, Foxborough
(United States) 1999	Group stage	23 June	Canada	W 7–1	Jack Kent Cooke Stadium, Landover
(United States) 1999	Group stage	26 June	Japan	W 4–0	Soldier Field, Chicago
(United States) 1999	Quarter-finals	30 June	Sweden	W 3–1	Spartan Stadium, San Jose
(United States) 1999	Semi-finals	4 July	China	L 0–5	Foxboro Stadium, Foxborough
(United States) 1999	Third place play-off	10 July	Brazil	D 0–0 (4–5 (p))	Rose Bowl, Pasadena
(United States) 2003	Group stage	20 September	France	W 2–0	Lincoln Financial Field, Philadelphia
(United States) 2003	Group stage	24 September	Brazil	L 1–4	RFK Stadium, Washington, D.C.
(United States) 2003	Group stage	27 September	South Korea	W 7–1	Gillette Stadium, Foxborough
(United States) 2003	Quarter-finals	1 October	United States	L 0–1	Gillette Stadium, Foxborough
(China) 2007	Group stage	12 September	Canada	W 2–1	Yellow Dragon Sports Center, Hangzhou
(China) 2007	Group stage	15 September	Australia	D 1–1	Yellow Dragon Sports Center, Hangzhou
(China) 2007	Group stage	20 September	Ghana	W 7–2	Yellow Dragon Sports Center, Hangzhou
(China) 2007	Quarter-finals	23 September	China	W 1–0	Wuhan Stadium, Wuhan
(China) 2007	Semi-finals	26 September	Germany	L 0–3	Tianjin Olympic Centre Stadium, Tianjin
(China) 2007	Third place play-off	30 September	United States	L 1–4	Hongkou Stadium, Shanghai
(Germany) 2011	Group stage	29 June	Equatorial Guinea	W 1–0	Impuls Arena, Augsburg
(Germany) 2011	Group stage	3 July	Brazil	L 0–3	Volkswagen-Arena, Wolfsburg
(Germany) 2011	Group stage	6 July	Australia	L 1–2	BayArena, Leverkusen
(Canada) 2015	Group stage	7 June	Thailand	W 4–0	TD Place Stadium, Ottawa
(Canada) 2015	Group stage	11 June	Germany	D 1–1	TD Place Stadium, Ottawa
(Canada) 2015	Group stage	15 June	Ivory Coast	W 3–1	Moncton Stadium, Moncton
(Canada) 2015	Round of 16	22 June	England	L 1–2	TD Place Stadium, Ottawa
(France) 2019	Group stage	8 June	Nigeria	W 3–0	Stade Auguste-Delaune, Reims
(France) 2019	Group stage	12 June	France	L 1–2	Allianz Riviera, Nice
(France) 2019	Group stage	17 June	South Korea	W 2–1	Stade Auguste-Delaune, Reims
(France) 2019	Round of 16	22 June	Australia	D 1–1 (4–1 (p))	Allianz Riviera, Nice
(France) 2019	Quarter-finals	27 June	England	L 0–3	Stade Océane, Le Havre
(Australia) / (New Zealand) 2023	Group stage	20 July	New Zealand	L 0–1	Eden Park, Auckland
(Australia) / (New Zealand) 2023	Group stage	25 July	Switzerland	D 0–0	Waikato Stadium, Hamilton
(Australia) / (New Zealand) 2023	Group stage	30 July	Philippines	W 6–0	Eden Park, Auckland
(Australia) / (New Zealand) 2023	Round of 16	5 August	Japan	L 1–3	Wellington Regional Stadium, Wellington

== Head-to-head record ==
Opponent	Pld	W	D	L	GF	GA	GD	Win %
Australia	3	0	2	1	3	4	−1	0.00
Brazil	3	0	1	2	1	7	−6	0.00
Canada	3	3	0	0	16	2	+14	100.00
China	3	1	0	2	1	9	−8	33.33
Denmark	2	2	0	0	5	2	+3	100.00
England	3	1	0	2	3	5	−2	33.33
Equatorial Guinea	1	1	0	0	1	0	+1	100.00
France	2	1	0	1	3	2	+1	50.00
Germany	3	1	1	1	3	4	−1	33.33
Ghana	1	1	0	0	7	2	+5	100.00
Italy	1	1	0	0	3	2	+1	100.00
Ivory Coast	1	1	0	0	3	1	+2	100.00
Japan	2	1	0	1	5	3	+2	50.00
New Zealand	2	1	0	1	4	1	+3	50.00
Nigeria	2	2	0	0	11	0	+11	100.00
Philippines	1	1	0	0	6	0	+6	100.00
Russia	1	1	0	0	2	1	+1	100.00
South Korea	2	2	0	0	9	2	+7	100.00
Sweden	2	2	0	0	7	2	+5	100.00
Switzerland	1	0	1	0	0	0	+0	0.00
Thailand	1	1	0	0	4	0	+4	100.00
United States	4	1	0	3	3	7	−4	25.00
Total	44	25	5	14	100	56	+44	56.82

== Goalscorers ==
Player	Goals	1991	1995	1999	2003	2007	2011	2015	2019	2023
Ann Kristin Aarønes	10		6	4						
Linda Medalen	9	6	2	1						
Hege Riise	9	1	5	3						
Marianne Pettersen	8		3	3	2					
Ragnhild Gulbrandsen	6					6				
Isabell Herlovsen	6					2		2	2	
Solveig Gulbrandsen	4			1	1			2		
Dagny Mellgren	4			1	3					
Tina Svensson	4	3	1							
Ada Hegerberg	3							3		
Kristin Sandberg	3		3							
Sophie Román Haug	3									3
Agnete Carlsen	2	2								
Linda Ørmen	2				2					
Brit Sandaune	2			1	1					
Ane Stangeland Horpestad	2					2				
Caroline Graham Hansen	2								1	1
Guro Reiten	2								1	1
Gro Espeseth	1		1							
Emilie Haavi	1						1			
Tone Haugen	1		1							
Birthe Hegstad	1	1								
Lise Klaveness	1					1				
Unni Lehn	1			1						
Randi Leinan	1		1							
Maren Mjelde	1							1		
Anita Rapp	1				1					
Trine Rønning	1							1		
Lisa-Marie Karlseng Utland	1								1	
Lene Storløkken	1					1				
Elise Thorsnes	1						1			
Guro Reiten	1									1
Own goals	4	1		1					2	1
Total	100	14	23	16	10	12	2	9	7	7

Own goals scored for opponents

- Trine Rønning (scored for Germany in 2007)
- Ingrid Syrstad Engen (scored for Japan in 2023)

== See also ==
- Norway at the UEFA Women's Championship
