= South Korea at the FIFA Women's World Cup =

The South Korea women's national football team has represented South Korea (Korea Republic) at the FIFA Women's World Cup on four occasions, in 2003, 2015, 2019, and 2023.

== Competitive record ==
FIFA Women's World Cup record									Qualification record					
Year	Round	Pld	W	D	L	GF	GA	Squad	Pld	W	D	L	GF	GA
(China) 1991	Did not qualify								Via AFC Women's Asian Cup					
(Sweden) 1995	Did not qualify								Via Asian Games					
(United States) 1999	Did not qualify								Via AFC Women's Asian Cup					
(United States) 2003	Group stage	3	0	0	3	1	11	Squad	Via AFC Women's Asian Cup					
(China) 2007	Did not qualify								Via AFC Women's Asian Cup					
(Germany) 2011	Did not qualify								Via AFC Women's Asian Cup					
(Canada) 2015	Round of 16	4	1	1	2	4	8	Squad	Via AFC Women's Asian Cup					
(France) 2019	Group stage	3	0	0	3	1	8	Squad	Via AFC Women's Asian Cup					
(Australia) (New Zealand) 2023	Group stage	3	0	1	2	1	4	Squad	Via AFC Women's Asian Cup					
(Brazil) 2027	Qualified								Via AFC Women's Asian Cup					
(Costa Rica) (Jamaica) (Mexico) (United States) 2031	To be determined								To be determined					
(United Kingdom) 2035	To be determined								To be determined					
Total	Round of 16	13	1	2	10	7	31	5/12	0	0	0	0	0	0

== Head-to-head record ==
Opponent	Pld	W	D	L	GF	GA	GD	Win %
Brazil	2	0	0	2	0	5	−5	0.00
Colombia	1	0	0	1	0	2	−2	0.00
Costa Rica	1	0	1	0	2	2	+0	0.00
France	3	0	0	3	0	8	−8	0.00
Germany	1	0	1	0	1	1	+0	0.00
Morocco	1	0	0	1	0	1	−1	0.00
Nigeria	1	0	0	1	0	2	−2	0.00
Norway	2	0	0	2	2	9	−7	0.00
Spain	1	1	0	0	2	1	+1	100.00
Total	13	1	2	10	7	31	−24	7.69

== Player records ==
=== Top goalscorers ===
Rank	Player	Goals
1	Cho So-hyun	2
2	Kim Jin-hee	1
2	Jeon Ga-eul	1
2	Ji So-yun	1
2	Kim Soo-yun	1
2	Yeo Min-ji	1

== Details ==
=== 2003 (United States) ===
21 September 2003 Group B	Brazil	3–0	South Korea	Robert F. Kennedy Memorial Stadium, Washington, D.C.
15:15	Marta 14' (pen.); Kátia 55', 62'	Report		Attendance: 34,144; Referee: Tammy Ogston (Australia)

24 September 2003 Group B	France	1–0	South Korea	Robert F. Kennedy Memorial Stadium, Washington, D.C.
19:45	Pichon 84'	Report		Attendance: 16,316; Referee: Zhang Dongqing (China PR)

27 September 2003 Group B	South Korea	1–7	Norway	Gillette Stadium, Foxborough
12:45	Kim Jin-hee 75'	Report	Gulbrandsen 5'; Mellgren 24', 31'; Pettersen 40'; Sandaune 52'; Ørmen 80', 90'	Attendance: 14,356; Referee: Tammy Ogston (Australia)

Group B table
Pos	Team	Pld	W	D	L	GF	GA	GD	Pts	Qualification
1	Brazil	3	2	1	0	8	2	+6	7	Advance to knockout stage
2	Norway	3	2	0	1	10	5	+5	6	Advance to knockout stage
3	France	3	1	1	1	2	3	−1	4	
4	South Korea	3	0	0	3	1	11	−10	0	

Source: FIFA
Rules for classification: Group stage tiebreakers

=== 2015 (Canada) ===
South Korea finished in fourth place at the 2014 AFC Women's Asian Cup and qualified for the 2015 FIFA Women's World Cup, where they made it out of the group stage for the first time. They were drawn in Group E with Brazil, Spain and Costa Rica. South Korea lost 2–0 to Brazil, but a 2–2 draw with Costa Rica and a 2–1 victory against Spain were enough to progress for the first time ever at a World Cup. They went on to lose 3–0 to France in the round of 16.

9 June 2015 Group E	Brazil	2–0	South Korea	Olympic Stadium, Montreal
19:00 EDT (UTC−4)	Formiga 33'; Marta 53' (pen.)	Report		Attendance: 10,175; Referee: Esther Staubli (Switzerland)

13 June 2015 Group E	South Korea	2–2	Costa Rica	Olympic Stadium, Montreal
19:00 EDT (UTC−4)	Ji So-yun 21' (pen.); Jeon Ga-eul 25'	Report	Herrera 17'; K. Villalobos 89'	Attendance: 28,623; Referee: Carina Vitulano (Italy)

17 June 2015 Group E	South Korea	2–1	Spain	TD Place Stadium, Ottawa
19:00 EDT (UTC−4)	Cho So-hyun 53'; Kim Soo-yun 78'	Report	Boquete 29'	Attendance: 21,562; Referee: Anna-Marie Keighley (New Zealand)

Group E table
Pos	Team	Pld	W	D	L	GF	GA	GD	Pts	Qualification
1	Brazil	3	3	0	0	4	0	+4	9	Advance to knockout stage
2	South Korea	3	1	1	1	4	5	−1	4	Advance to knockout stage
3	Costa Rica	3	0	2	1	3	4	−1	2	
4	Spain	3	0	1	2	2	4	−2	1	

Source: FIFA
Rules for classification: Group stage tiebreakers

21 June 2015 Round of 16	France	3–0	South Korea	Olympic Stadium, Montreal
16:00 EDT (UTC−4)	Delie 4', 48'; Thomis 8'	Report		Attendance: 15,518; Referee: Salomé di Iorio (Argentina)

=== 2019 (France) ===
Coming off an improved showing at the previous one, South Korea qualified for the 2019 FIFA Women's World Cup and were put in Group A with France, Norway and Nigeria. However, they could not repeat their prior success in 2015 and lost all three games and exited the tournament in the group stage, only scoring one goal in their entire run and even an own goal.

7 June 2019 Group A	France	4–0	South Korea	Parc des Princes, Paris
21:00	Le Sommer 9'; Renard 35', 45+2'; Henry 85'	Report		Attendance: 45,261; Referee: Claudia Umpiérrez (Uruguay)

12 June 2019 Group A	Nigeria	2–0	South Korea	Stade des Alpes, Grenoble
15:00	Kim Do-yeon 29' (o.g.); Oshoala 75'	Report		Attendance: 11,252; Referee: Anastasia Pustovoitova (Russia)

17 June 2019 Group A	South Korea	1–2	Norway	Stade Auguste-Delaune, Reims
21:00	Yeo Min-ji 78'	Report	Graham Hansen 5' (pen.); Herlovsen 51' (pen.)	Attendance: 13,034; Referee: Marie-Soleil Beaudoin (Canada)

Group A table
Pos	Team	Pld	W	D	L	GF	GA	GD	Pts	Qualification
1	France (H)	3	3	0	0	7	1	+6	9	Advance to knockout stage
2	Norway	3	2	0	1	6	3	+3	6	Advance to knockout stage
3	Nigeria	3	1	0	2	2	4	−2	3	Advance to knockout stage
4	South Korea	3	0	0	3	1	8	−7	0	

Source: FIFA
Rules for classification: Group stage tiebreakers
(H) Hosts

=== 2023 (Australia and New Zealand) ===
South Korea next qualified for the 2023 FIFA Women's World Cup. As in 2019, the team scored only one goal, but achieved a notable result by drawing their final match with Germany 1–1, which resulted in the Germans exiting the tournament at the group stage despite being second in the FIFA Ranking at the time.

25 July 2023 Group H	Colombia	2–0	South Korea	Sydney Football Stadium, Sydney
12:00 UTC+10	Usme 30' (pen.); Caicedo 39'	Report		Attendance: 24,323; Referee: Rebecca Welch (England)

30 July 2023 Group H	South Korea	0–1	Morocco	Hindmarsh Stadium, Adelaide
14:00 UTC+9:30		Report	Jraïdi 6'	Attendance: 12,886; Referee: Edina Alves Batista (Brazil)

3 August 2023 Group H	South Korea	1–1	Germany	Lang Park, Brisbane
20:00 UTC+10	Cho So-hyun 6'	Report	Popp 42'	Attendance: 38,945; Referee: Anna-Marie Keighley (New Zealand)

Group H table
Pos	Team	Pld	W	D	L	GF	GA	GD	Pts	Qualification
1	Colombia	3	2	0	1	4	2	+2	6	Advance to knockout stage
2	Morocco	3	2	0	1	2	6	−4	6	Advance to knockout stage
3	Germany	3	1	1	1	8	3	+5	4	
4	South Korea	3	0	1	2	1	4	−3	1	

Source: FIFA
Rules for classification: Group stage tiebreakers

== See also ==
- History of the South Korea national football team
