= 2018–19 in French football =

Football season in France

Football in France
- Season: 2018–19

Men's football
- Ligue 1: Paris Saint-Germain
- Ligue 2: Metz
- Championnat National: Rodez
- Coupe de France: Rennes
- Coupe de la Ligue: Strasbourg
- Trophée des Champions: Paris Saint-Germain

Women's football
- Division 1: Lyon
- Coupe de France: Lyon

The following article is a summary of the 2018–19 football season in France, which was the 85th season of competitive football in the country and ran from July 2018 to June 2019.

== National teams ==
=== France national football team ===
==== Friendly matches ====
11 October 2018	France	2–2	Iceland	Guingamp, France
21:00 CEST (UTC+2)	Hólmar 86' (o.g.); Mbappé 90' (pen.)	Report	Birkir 30'; Kári 58'	Stadium: Stade de Roudourou; Attendance: 17,000; Referee: Tiago Martins (Portugal)

20 November 2018	France	1–0	Uruguay	Saint-Denis, France
21:00 CET (UTC+1)	Giroud 52' (pen.)	Report		Stadium: Stade de France; Attendance: 70,000; Referee: Damir Skomina (Slovenia)

2 June 2019	France	2–0	Bolivia	Nantes, France
21:00 CEST (UTC+2)	Lemar 5'; Griezmann 43'	Report		Stadium: Stade de la Beaujoire; Attendance: 35,228; Referee: Alberto Undiano Mallenco (Spain)

==== UEFA Nations League A ====
===== Group 1 =====
Pos	Team	Pld	W	D	L	GF	GA	GD	Pts	Qualification (Note: Due to revamp of the format for the 2020–21 UEFA Nations League, no teams were eventually relegated.)	(Netherlands)	(France)	(Germany)
1	Netherlands	4	2	1	1	8	4	+4	7 (Note: Head-to-head goal difference: Netherlands +1, France −1.)	Qualification for Nations League Finals	—	2–0	3–0
2	France	4	2	1	1	4	4	0	7		2–1	—	2–1
3	Germany	4	0	2	2	3	7	−4	2		2–2	0–0	—

Source: UEFA
Rules for classification: Tiebreakers

==== UEFA Euro 2020 qualifying ====
===== Group H =====
Pos	Team	Pld	W	D	L	GF	GA	GD	Pts	Qualification	(France)	(Turkey)	(Iceland)	(Albania)	(Andorra)	(Moldova)
1	France	10	8	1	1	25	6	+19	25	Qualify for final tournament	—	1–1	4–0	4–1	3–0	2–1
2	Turkey	10	7	2	1	18	3	+15	23	Qualify for final tournament	2–0	—	0–0	1–0	1–0	4–0
3	Iceland	10	6	1	3	14	11	+3	19	Advance to play-offs via Nations League	0–1	2–1	—	1–0	2–0	3–0
4	Albania	10	4	1	5	16	14	+2	13		0–2	0–2	4–2	—	2–2	2–0
5	Andorra	10	1	1	8	3	20	−17	4		0–4	0–2	0–2	0–3	—	1–0
6	Moldova	10	1	0	9	4	26	−22	3		1–4	0–4	1–2	0–4	1–0	—

Source: UEFA
Rules for classification: Qualification tiebreakers

22 March 2019	Moldova	1–4	France	Chișinău, Moldova
20:45 (21:45 UTC+2)	Ambros 89'	Report	Griezmann 24'; Varane 27'; Giroud 36'; Mbappé 87'	Stadium: Zimbru Stadium; Attendance: 10,042; Referee: Aleksandar Stavrev (Macedonia)

25 March 2019	France	4–0	Iceland	Saint-Denis, France
20:45	Umtiti 12'; Giroud 68'; Mbappé 78'; Griezmann 84'	Report		Stadium: Stade de France; Attendance: 64,538; Referee: István Kovács (Romania)

8 June 2019	Turkey	2–0	France	Konya, Turkey
20:45 (21:45 UTC+3)	Ayhan 30'; Ünder 40'	Report		Stadium: Büyükşehir Stadium; Referee: Damir Skomina (Slovenia)

11 June 2019	Andorra	0–4	France	Andorra la Vella, Andorra
20:45		Report	Mbappé 11'; Ben Yedder 30'; Thauvin 45+1'; Zouma 60'	Stadium: Estadi Nacional; Attendance: 3,300; Referee: Fran Jović (Croatia)

=== France women's national football team ===
==== Friendly matches ====
1 September 2018	France	4–0	Mexico	Amiens, France
21:00	Diani 9'; Thiney 49'; Le Sommer 54', 88' (pen.)	Report		Stadium: Stade de la Licorne; Attendance: 8,080; Referee: Irina Lyussin (Belgium)

5 October 2018	France	2–0	Australia	Saint-Étienne, France
21:00	Le Sommer 56', 90'	Report		Stadium: Stade Geoffroy-Guichard; Attendance: 10,815; Referee: Ivana Martinčić (Croatia)

9 October 2018	France	6–0	Cameroon	Grenoble, France
21:00	Mbock 36', 88' (pen.); Diani 44'; Le Sommer 47'; Dali 54', 60'	Report		Stadium: Stade des Alpes; Attendance: 8,023; Referee: Désirée Grundbacher (Switzerland)

10 November 2018	France	3–1	Brazil	Nice, France
21:00	Cascarino 23'; Bussaglia 47'; Renard 75'	Report	Darlene 90+4'	Stadium: Allianz Riviera; Attendance: 12,073; Referee: Marta Huerta De Aza (Spain)

19 January 2019	France	3–1	United States	Le Havre, France
20:45	Diani 9', 56'; Katoto 78'	Report	Pugh 90+1'	Stadium: Stade Océane; Attendance: 22,870; Referee: Pernilla Larsson (Sweden)

28 February 2019	France	0–1	Germany	Laval, France
21:00		Report	Schüller 31'	Stadium: Stade Francis Le Basser; Attendance: 10,238; Referee: Kateryna Monzul (Ukraine)

4 March 2019	France	6–0	Uruguay	Tours, France
21:00	Asseyi 21'; Bilbault 36'; Gauvin 45', 67'; Geyoro 48'; Clemaron 83'	Report		Stadium: Stade de la Vallée du Cher; Attendance: 11,019; Referee: Monika Mularczyk (Poland)

4 April 2019	France	3–1	Japan	Auxerre, France
21:00	Gauvin 3'; Le Sommer 33'; Diani 82'	Report	Kobayashi 24'	Stadium: Stade de l'Abbé-Deschamps; Attendance: 15,379; Referee: Sara Persson (Sweden)

8 April 2019	France	4–0	Denmark	Strasbourg, France
21:00	Cascarino 31', 47'; Mbock 54'; Gauvin 66'	Report		Stadium: Stade de la Meinau; Attendance: 15,874; Referee: Ivana Martinčić (Croatia)

25 May 2019	France	3–0	Thailand	Orléans, France
16:00	Bussaglia 61'; Diani 78', 86'	Report		Stadium: Stade de la Source; Attendance: 7,000; Referee: Lina Lehtovaara

31 May 2019	France	2–1	China	Creteil, France
21:00	Gauvin 30'; Diani 58'	Report	Wang 52'	Stadium: Stade Dominique Duvauchelle; Referee: Bram Van Driessche (Belgium)

==== 2019 FIFA Women's World Cup ====
===== Group A =====
Pos	Team	Pld	W	D	L	GF	GA	GD	Pts	Qualification
1	France (H)	3	3	0	0	7	1	+6	9	Advance to knockout stage
2	Norway	3	2	0	1	6	3	+3	6	Advance to knockout stage
3	Nigeria	3	1	0	2	2	4	−2	3	Advance to knockout stage
4	South Korea	3	0	0	3	1	8	−7	0	

Source: FIFA
Rules for classification: Group stage tiebreakers
(H) Hosts

7 June 2019 Group A	France	4–0	South Korea	Paris
21:00	Le Sommer 9'; Renard 35', 45+2'; Henry 85'	Report		Stadium: Parc des Princes; Attendance: 45,261; Referee: Claudia Umpiérrez (Uruguay)

12 June 2019 Group A	France	2–1	Norway	Nice
21:00	Gauvin 46'; Le Sommer 72' (pen.)	Report	Renard 54' (o.g.)	Stadium: Allianz Riviera, Attendance: 34,872; Referee: Bibiana Steinhaus (Germany)

17 June 2019 Group A	Nigeria	0–1	France	Rennes
21:00		Report	Renard 79' (pen.)	Stadium: Roazhon Park; Attendance: 28,267; Referee: Melissa Borjas (Honduras)

===== Knockout stage =====
23 June 2019 Round of 16	France	2–1 (a.e.t.)	Brazil	Le Havre
21:00	Gauvin 52'; Henry 106'	Report	Thaisa 63'	Stadium: Stade Océane; Attendance: 23,965; Referee: Marie-Soleil Beaudoin (Canada)

28 June 2019 Quarter-finals	France	1–2	United States	Paris
21:00	Renard 81'	Report	Rapinoe 5', 65'	Stadium: Parc des Princes; Attendance: 45,595; Referee: Kateryna Monzul (Ukraine)

== League tables ==
=== Ligue 1 ===
Pos	Team	Pld	W	D	L	GF	GA	GD	Pts	Qualification or relegation
1	Paris Saint-Germain (C)	38	29	4	5	105	35	+70	91	Qualification to Champions League group stage
2	Lille	38	22	9	7	68	33	+35	75	Qualification to Champions League group stage
3	Lyon	38	21	9	8	70	47	+23	72	Qualification to Champions League group stage
4	Saint-Étienne	38	19	9	10	59	41	+18	66	Qualification to Europa League group stage
5	Marseille	38	18	7	13	60	52	+8	61	
6	Montpellier	38	15	14	9	53	42	+11	59	
7	Nice	38	15	11	12	30	35	−5	56	
8	Reims	38	13	16	9	39	42	−3	55	
9	Nîmes	38	15	8	15	57	58	−1	53	
10	Rennes	38	13	13	12	55	52	+3	52	Qualification to Europa League group stage (Note: Rennes qualified for the Europa League group stage by winning the 2018–19 Coupe de France.)
11	Strasbourg	38	11	16	11	58	48	+10	49	Qualification to Europa League second qualifying round (Note: Strasbourg qualified for the Europa League second qualifying round by winning the 2018–19 Coupe de la Ligue.)
12	Nantes	38	13	9	16	48	48	0	48	
13	Angers	38	10	16	12	44	49	−5	46	
14	Bordeaux	38	10	11	17	34	42	−8	41	
15	Amiens	38	9	11	18	31	52	−21	38	
16	Toulouse	38	8	14	16	35	57	−22	38	
17	Monaco	38	8	12	18	38	57	−19	36	
18	Dijon (O)	38	9	7	22	31	60	−29	34	Qualification to Relegation play-offs
19	Caen (R)	38	7	12	19	29	54	−25	33	Relegation to Ligue 2
20	Guingamp (R)	38	5	12	21	28	68	−40	27	Relegation to Ligue 2

Source: Ligue 1 and Soccerway
Rules for classification: 1) Points; 2) Goal difference; 3) Head-to-head points; 4) Head-to-head goal difference; 5) Head-to-head goals scored; 6) Head-to-head away goals scored; 7) Goals scored; 8) Away goals scored; 9) Most goals scored in single league match; 10) Fairplay ranking.
(C) Champions; (O) Play-off winners; (R) Relegated

=== Ligue 2 ===
Pos	Team	Pld	W	D	L	GF	GA	GD	Pts	Promotion or Relegation
1	Metz (C, P)	38	24	9	5	60	23	+37	81	Promotion to Ligue 1
2	Brest (P)	38	21	11	6	64	35	+29	74	Promotion to Ligue 1
3	Troyes	38	21	8	9	51	28	+23	71	Qualification to promotion play-offs semi-final
4	Paris FC	38	17	14	7	36	22	+14	65	Qualification to promotion play-offs quarter-final
5	Lens	38	18	9	11	49	28	+21	63	Qualification to promotion play-offs quarter-final
6	Lorient	38	17	12	9	51	41	+10	63	
7	Le Havre	38	13	15	10	45	40	+5	54	
8	Orléans	38	15	7	16	51	53	−2	52	
9	Grenoble	38	13	11	14	43	47	−4	50	
10	Clermont	38	11	15	12	44	37	+7	48	
11	Châteauroux	38	11	15	12	37	42	−5	48	
12	Niort	38	11	14	13	34	41	−7	47	
13	Valenciennes	38	11	10	17	52	61	−9	43	
14	Nancy	38	12	6	20	36	50	−14	42	
15	Auxerre	38	10	11	17	34	36	−2	41	
16	Sochaux	38	11	8	19	27	43	−16	41	
17	Ajaccio	38	9	13	16	29	45	−16	40	
18	Gazélec Ajaccio (R)	38	9	12	17	30	54	−24	39	Qualification to relegation play-offs
19	Béziers (R)	38	9	11	18	33	50	−17	38	Relegation to Championnat National
20	Red Star (R)	38	7	9	22	28	58	−30	30	Relegation to Championnat National

Source: Ligue 2
Rules for classification: 1) Points; 2) Goal difference; 3) Number of goals scored; 4) Head-to-head goal difference; 5) Fair play points
(C) Champions; (P) Promoted; (R) Relegated

=== Championnat National ===
28 May 2019
20:45 CEST

Le Mans	1–2	Gazélec Ajaccio
Boissier 53'	Report	Blayac 14'; Jobello 48'

MMArena, Le Mans
Attendance: 22,800
Referee: François Letexier

2 June 2019
20:45 CEST

Gazélec Ajaccio	0–2	Le Mans
	Report	Boissier 73'; Mamadou 90+7'

Stade Ange Casanova, Ajaccio
Attendance: 3,500
Referee: Mikael Lesage

=== Championnat National 2 ===
Group A

Pos	Team	Pld	Pts
1	Toulon (P)	30	59
2	Fréjus Saint-Raphaël	30	57
3	Annecy	30	53
4	Jura Sud	30	50
5	Athlético Marseille	30	47
6	Endoume Marseille	30	44
7	Hyères	30	41
8	Saint-Priest	30	40
9	Martigues	30	40
10	Grasse	30	39
11	Chasselay MDA	30	39
12	Lyon (res)	30	37
13	Olympic Marseille (res)	30	35
14	Monaco (res)	30	33
15	Pontarlier (R)	30	22
16	Nice (res) (R)	30	20

Source: FFF.fr
(P) Promoted;
(R) Relegated
Group B

Pos	Team	Pld	Pts
1	Le Puy (P)	30	52
2	Les Herbiers	30	50
3	Andrézieux	30	48
4	Yzeure	30	47
5	Sète	30	46
6	Blois	30	45
7	Saint-Pryvé	30	44
8	Bergerac	30	42
9	Saint-Étienne (res)	30	41
10	Colomiers	30	40
11	Stade Bordelais	30	38
12	Romorantin	30	37
13	Trélissac	30	37
14	Nîmes (res)	30	33
15	Bordeaux (res) (R)	30	26
16	Mont-de-Marsan (R)	30	25

Source: FFF.fr
(P) Promoted;
(R) Relegated
Group C

Pos	Team	Pld	Pts
1	Nantes (res)	30	55
2	Bastia-Borgo (P)	30	54
3	Chartres	30	52
4	Saint-Brieuc	30	50
5	Lorient (res)	30	47
6	Oissel	30	41
7	Vannes	30	40
8	Mantes	30	39
9	Poissy	30	39
10	Granville	30	38
11	Saint-Malo	30	37
12	Vitré	30	36
13	Paris Saint-Germain (res)	30	33
14	Furiani-Agliani (R)	30	33
15	Boulogne-Billancourt (R)	30	29
16	Le Havre (res) (R)	30	29

Source: FFF.fr
(P) Promoted;
(R) Relegated
Group D

Pos	Team	Pld	Pts
1	Créteil (C, P)	30	59
2	Saint-Maur	30	49
3	Sedan	30	47
4	Lille (res)	30	46
5	Sainte-Geneviève	30	45
6	Croix	30	43
7	Schiltigheim	30	42
8	Épinal	30	42
9	Reims (res)	30	41
10	Fleury	30	39
11	Lens (res)	30	37
12	Belfort	30	35
13	Bobigny	30	34
14	Haguenau	30	31
15	Feignies Aulnoye (R)	30	31
16	Arras (R)	30	21

Source: FFF.fr
(C) Champions;
(P) Promoted;
(R) Relegated

== Cup competitions ==
=== 2018–19 Coupe de France ===
==== Final ====
27 April 2019
21:00 CEST

Rennes	2–2 (a.e.t.)	Paris Saint-Germain
Kimpembe 40' (o.g.); Mexer 66'	Report	Dani Alves 13'; Neymar 21'
Penalties
Niang (penalty scored); Ben Arfa (penalty scored); Grenier (penalty scored); Léa Siliki (penalty scored); Bensebaini (penalty scored); Sarr (penalty scored)	6–5	(penalty scored) Cavani; (penalty scored) Dani Alves; (penalty scored) Paredes; (penalty scored) Bernat; (penalty scored) Neymar; (penalty missed) Nkunku

Stade de France, Saint-Denis
Attendance: 75,000
Referee: Ruddy Buquet

=== 2018–19 Coupe de la Ligue ===
==== Final ====
30 March 2019
21:05 CET

Strasbourg	0–0 (a.e.t.)	Guingamp
	Report
Penalties
Prcić (penalty scored); Thomasson (penalty scored); Liénard (penalty scored); Carole (penalty scored)	4–1	(penalty missed) Mendy; (penalty scored) Didot; (penalty missed) Rodelin

Stade Pierre-Mauroy, Villeneuve-d'Ascq
Attendance: 49,161
Referee: Benoît Millot

=== 2018 Trophée des Champions ===
4 August 2018
20:00 CST

Paris Saint-Germain	4–0	Monaco
Di María 32', 90+2'; Nkunku 39'; Weah 67'	Report

Shenzhen Universiade Sports Centre, Shenzhen
Attendance: 41,237
Referee: Ruddy Buquet

== UEFA competitions ==
=== UEFA Champions League ===
==== Group stage ====
===== Group A =====
Pos	Team	Pld	W	D	L	GF	GA	GD	Pts	Qualification	DOR	ATM	BRU	MON
1	(Germany) Borussia Dortmund	6	4	1	1	10	2	+8	13 (Note: Head-to-head goal difference: Borussia Dortmund +2, Atlético Madrid –2.)	Advance to knockout phase	—	4–0	0–0	3–0
2	(Spain) Atlético Madrid	6	4	1	1	9	6	+3	13	Advance to knockout phase	2–0	—	3–1	2–0
3	(Belgium) Club Brugge	6	1	3	2	6	5	+1	6	Transfer to Europa League	0–1	0–0	—	1–1
4	(France) Monaco	6	0	1	5	2	14	−12	1		0–2	1–2	0–4	—

Source: UEFA

===== Group C =====
Pos	Team	Pld	W	D	L	GF	GA	GD	Pts	Qualification	PAR	LIV	NAP	RSB
1	(France) Paris Saint-Germain	6	3	2	1	17	9	+8	11	Advance to knockout phase	—	2–1	2–2	6–1
2	(England) Liverpool	6	3	0	3	9	7	+2	9 (Note: Goals in all group matches: Liverpool 9, Napoli 7.)	Advance to knockout phase	3–2	—	1–0	4–0
3	(Italy) Napoli	6	2	3	1	7	5	+2	9	Transfer to Europa League	1–1	1–0	—	3–1
4	(Serbia) Red Star Belgrade	6	1	1	4	5	17	−12	4		1–4	2–0	0–0	—

Source: UEFA

===== Group F =====
Pos	Team	Pld	W	D	L	GF	GA	GD	Pts	Qualification	MCI	LYO	SHK	HOF
1	(England) Manchester City	6	4	1	1	16	6	+10	13	Advance to knockout phase	—	1–2	6–0	2–1
2	(France) Lyon	6	1	5	0	12	11	+1	8	Advance to knockout phase	2–2	—	2–2	2–2
3	(Ukraine) Shakhtar Donetsk	6	1	3	2	8	16	−8	6	Transfer to Europa League	0–3	1–1	—	2–2
4	(Germany) TSG Hoffenheim	6	0	3	3	11	14	−3	3		1–2	3–3	2–3	—

Source: UEFA

===== Round of 16 =====
Team 1	Agg.	Team 2	1st leg	2nd leg
Manchester United (England)	3–3 (a)	(France) Paris Saint-Germain	0–2	3–1
Lyon (France)	1–5	(Spain) Barcelona	0–0	1–5

=== UEFA Europa League ===
==== Qualifying phase and play-off round ====
===== Second qualifying round =====
Team 1	Agg.	Team 2	1st leg	2nd leg
Ventspils (Latvia)	1–3	(France) Bordeaux	0–1	1–2

===== Third qualifying round =====
Team 1	Agg.	Team 2	1st leg	2nd leg
Mariupol (Ukraine)	2–5	(France) Bordeaux	1–3	1–2

===== Play-off round =====
Team 1	Agg.	Team 2	1st leg	2nd leg
Gent (Belgium)	0–2	(France) Bordeaux	0–0	0–2

==== Group stage ====
===== Group C =====
Pos	Team	Pld	W	D	L	GF	GA	GD	Pts	Qualification	ZEN	SLP	BOR	KOB
1	(Russia) Zenit Saint Petersburg	6	3	2	1	6	5	+1	11	Advance to knockout phase	—	1–0	2–1	1–0
2	(Czech Republic) Slavia Prague	6	3	1	2	4	3	+1	10	Advance to knockout phase	2–0	—	1–0	0–0
3	(France) Bordeaux	6	2	1	3	6	6	0	7		1–1	2–0	—	1–2
4	(Denmark) Copenhagen	6	1	2	3	3	5	−2	5		1–1	0–1	0–1	—

Source: UEFA
Rules for classification: Group stage tiebreakers

===== Group H =====
Pos	Team	Pld	W	D	L	GF	GA	GD	Pts	Qualification	FRA	LAZ	APL	MAR
1	(Germany) Eintracht Frankfurt	6	6	0	0	17	5	+12	18	Advance to knockout phase	—	4–1	2–0	4–0
2	(Italy) Lazio	6	3	0	3	9	11	−2	9	Advance to knockout phase	1–2	—	2–1	2–1
3	(Cyprus) Apollon Limassol	6	2	1	3	10	10	0	7		2–3	2–0	—	2–2
4	(France) Marseille	6	0	1	5	6	16	−10	1		1–2	1–3	1–3	—

Source: UEFA
Rules for classification: Group stage tiebreakers

===== Group K =====
Pos	Team	Pld	W	D	L	GF	GA	GD	Pts	Qualification	DKV	REN	AST	JAB
1	(Ukraine) Dynamo Kyiv	6	3	2	1	10	7	+3	11	Advance to knockout phase	—	3–1	2–2	0–1
2	(France) Rennes	6	3	0	3	7	8	−1	9	Advance to knockout phase	1–2	—	2–0	2–1
3	(Kazakhstan) Astana	6	2	2	2	7	7	0	8		0–1	2–0	—	2–1
4	(Czech Republic) Jablonec	6	1	2	3	6	8	−2	5		2–2	0–1	1–1	—

Source: UEFA
Rules for classification: Group stage tiebreakers

==== Knockout phase ====
===== Round of 32 =====
Team 1	Agg.	Team 2	1st leg	2nd leg
Rennes (France)	6–4	(Spain) Real Betis	3–3	3–1

===== Round of 16 =====
Team 1	Agg.	Team 2	1st leg	2nd leg
Rennes (France)	3–4	(England) Arsenal	3–1	0–3

=== UEFA Youth League ===
==== UEFA Champions League Path ====
===== Group A =====
Pos	Team	Pld	W	D	L	GF	GA	GD	Pts	Qualification	ATM	MON	BRU	DOR
1	(Spain) Atlético Madrid	6	4	0	2	15	8	+7	12	Round of 16	—	3–0	1–2	4–0
2	(France) Monaco	6	3	1	2	9	9	0	10	Play-offs	0–2	—	3–1	1–1
3	(Belgium) Club Brugge	6	2	1	3	10	11	−1	7		3–1	2–3	—	1–1
4	(Germany) Borussia Dortmund	6	1	2	3	7	13	−6	5		3–4	0–2	2–1	—

Source: UEFA
Rules for classification: Group stage tiebreakers

===== Group C =====
Pos	Team	Pld	W	D	L	GF	GA	GD	Pts	Qualification	LIV	PAR	NAP	RSB
1	(England) Liverpool	6	4	1	1	17	7	+10	13	Round of 16	—	5–2	5–0	2–1
2	(France) Paris Saint-Germain	6	4	1	1	13	10	+3	13	Play-offs	3–2	—	0–0	2–1
3	(Italy) Napoli	6	1	3	2	9	15	−6	6		1–1	2–5	—	5–3
4	(Serbia) Red Star Belgrade	6	0	1	5	6	13	−7	1		0–2	0–1	1–1	—

Source: UEFA
Rules for classification: Group stage tiebreakers

===== Group F =====
Pos	Team	Pld	W	D	L	GF	GA	GD	Pts	Qualification	HOF	LYO	MCI	SHK
1	(Germany) TSG Hoffenheim	6	3	2	1	15	10	+5	11	Round of 16	—	3–1	5–2	1–1
2	(France) Lyon	6	3	2	1	13	8	+5	11	Play-offs	3–3	—	2–0	2–0
3	(England) Manchester City	6	2	1	3	10	14	−4	7		2–1	1–4	—	4–1
4	(Ukraine) Shakhtar Donetsk	6	0	3	3	5	11	−6	3		1–2	1–1	1–1	—

Source: UEFA
Rules for classification: Group stage tiebreakers

==== Domestic Champions Path ====
===== First round =====
Team 1	Agg.	Team 2	1st leg	2nd leg
Žilina (Slovakia)	1–7	(France) Montpellier	1–5	0–2

===== Second round =====
Team 1	Agg.	Team 2	1st leg	2nd leg
Altınordu (Turkey)	2–5	(France) Montpellier	2–4	0–1

==== Play-offs ====
Team 1	Score	Team 2
Chelsea (England)	3–1	(France) Monaco
Montpellier (France)	2–1	(Portugal) Benfica
Hertha BSC (Germany)	2–1	(France) Paris Saint-Germain
Sigma Olomouc (Czech Republic)	0–2	(France) Lyon

==== Knockout phase ====
===== Round of 16 =====
Team 1	Score	Team 2
Chelsea (England)	2–1	(France) Montpellier
Lyon (France)	2–2 (6–5 p)	(Netherlands) Ajax

===== Quarter-finals =====
Team 1	Score	Team 2
Barcelona (Spain)	3–2	(France) Lyon

=== UEFA Women's Champions League ===
==== Knockout phase ====
===== Round of 32 =====
Team 1	Agg.	Team 2	1st leg	2nd leg
Avaldsnes (Norway)	0–7	(France) Lyon	0–2	0–5
St. Pölten (Austria)	1–6	(France) Paris Saint-Germain	1–4	0–2

===== Round of 16 =====
Team 1	Agg.	Team 2	1st leg	2nd leg
Ajax (Netherlands)	0–13	(France) Lyon	0–4	0–9
Linköping (Sweden)	2–5	(France) Paris Saint-Germain	0–2	2–3

===== Quarter-finals =====
Team 1	Agg.	Team 2	1st leg	2nd leg
Lyon (France)	6–3	(Germany) VfL Wolfsburg	2–1	4–2
Chelsea (England)	3–2	(France) Paris Saint-Germain	2–0	1–2

===== Semi-finals =====
Team 1	Agg.	Team 2	1st leg	2nd leg
Lyon (France)	3–2	(England) Chelsea	2–1	1–1

===== Final =====
The final was played on 18 May 2019 at the Groupama Arena in Budapest. The "home" team for the final (for administrative purposes) was determined by an additional draw held after the quarter-final and semi-final draws.

18 May 2019
18:00 UTC+2

Lyon (France)	4–1	(Spain) Barcelona
Marozsán 5'; Hegerberg 14', 19', 30'	Report	Oshoala 89'

Groupama Arena, Budapest
Attendance: 19,487
Referee: Anastasia Pustovoitova (Russia)
