= France at the FIFA Women's World Cup =

France women's national football team's record at the FIFA Women's World Cup

The France women's national football team has represented France at the FIFA Women's World Cup at five stagings of the tournament, in 2003, 2011, 2015, 2019 and 2023, they hosted in 2019.

== FIFA Women's World Cup record ==
| Year | Result | Position | Pld | W | D* | L | GF | GA |
|---|---|---|---|---|---|---|---|---|
| (China) 1991 | Did not qualify | | | | | | | |
| (Sweden) 1995 | Did not qualify | | | | | | | |
| (United States) 1999 | Did not qualify | | | | | | | |
| (United States) 2003 | Group stage | 9th | 3 | 1 | 1 | 1 | 2 | 3 |
| (China) 2007 | Did not qualify | | | | | | | |
| (Germany) 2011 | Fourth place | 4th | 6 | 2 | 1 | 3 | 10 | 10 |
| (Canada) 2015 | Quarter-finals | 5th | 5 | 3 | 1 | 1 | 10 | 3 |
| (France) 2019 | Quarter-finals | 6th | 5 | 4 | 0 | 1 | 10 | 4 |
| (Australia) (New Zealand) 2023 | Quarter-finals | 6th | 5 | 3 | 2 | 0 | 12 | 4 |
| (Brazil) 2027 | Qualified | | | | | | | |
| (Costa Rica) (Jamaica) (Mexico) (United States) 2031 | To be determined | | | | | | | |
| (United Kingdom) 2035 | To be determined | | | | | | | |
| Total | 6/10 | 4th | 24 | 13 | 5 | 6 | 44 | 24 |

FIFA Women's World Cup history
| Year | Round | Date | Opponent | Result | Stadium |
|---|---|---|---|---|---|
| (United States) 2003 | Group stage | 20 September | Norway | L 0–2 | Lincoln Financial Field, Philadelphia |
| (United States) 2003 | Group stage | 24 September | South Korea | W 1–0 | RFK Stadium, Washington |
| (United States) 2003 | Group stage | 27 September | Brazil | D 1–1 | RFK Stadium, Washington |
| (Germany) 2011 | Group stage | 26 June | Nigeria | W 1–0 | Rhein-Neckar-Arena, Sinsheim |
| (Germany) 2011 | Group stage | 30 June | Canada | W 4–0 | Ruhrstadion, Bochum |
| (Germany) 2011 | Group stage | 5 July | Germany | L 2–4 | Borussia-Park, Mönchengladbach |
| (Germany) 2011 | Quarter-finals | 9 July | England | D 1–1 (4–3 (p)) | BayArena, Leverkusen |
| (Germany) 2011 | Semi-finals | 13 July | United States | L 1–3 | Borussia-Park, Mönchengladbach |
| (Germany) 2011 | Third place play-off | 16 July | Sweden | L 1–2 | Rhein-Neckar-Arena, Sinsheim |
| (Canada) 2015 | Group stage | 9 June | England | W 1–0 | Moncton Stadium, Moncton |
| (Canada) 2015 | Group stage | 13 June | Colombia | L 0–2 | Moncton Stadium, Moncton |
| (Canada) 2015 | Group stage | 17 June | Mexico | W 5–0 | Lansdowne Stadium, Ottawa |
| (Canada) 2015 | Round of 16 | 21 June | South Korea | W 3–0 | Olympic Stadium, Montreal |
| (Canada) 2015 | Quarter-finals | 26 June | Germany | D 1–1 (4–5 (p)) | Olympic Stadium, Montreal |
| (France) 2019 | Group stage | 7 June | South Korea | W 4–0 | Parc des Princes, Paris |
| (France) 2019 | Group stage | 12 June | Norway | W 2–1 | Allianz Riviera, Nice |
| (France) 2019 | Group stage | 17 June | Nigeria | W 1–0 | Roazhon Park, Rennes |
| (France) 2019 | Round of 16 | 23 June | Brazil | W 2–1 (a.e.t.) | Stade Océane, Le Havre |
| (France) 2019 | Quarter-finals | 28 June | United States | L 1–2 | Parc des Princes, Paris |
| (Australia) (New Zealand) 2023 | Group stage | 23 July | Jamaica | D 0–0 | Sydney Football Stadium, Sydney |
| (Australia) (New Zealand) 2023 | Group stage | 29 July | Brazil | W 2–1 | Lang Park, Brisbane |
| (Australia) (New Zealand) 2023 | Group stage | 2 August | Panama | W 6–3 | Sydney Football Stadium, Sydney |
| (Australia) (New Zealand) 2023 | Round of 16 | 8 August | Morocco | W 4–0 | Hindmarsh Stadium, Adelaide |
| (Australia) (New Zealand) 2023 | Quarter-finals | 12 August | Australia | D 0–0 (6–7 (p)) | Lang Park, Brisbane |
| (Brazil) 2027 | Group stage | | | | |

== 2003 FIFA Women's World Cup ==
=== Group B ===
| Pos | Team | Pld | W | D | L | GF | GA | GD | Pts | Qualification |
|---|---|---|---|---|---|---|---|---|---|---|
| 1 | Brazil | 3 | 2 | 1 | 0 | 8 | 2 | +6 | 7 | Advance to knockout stage |
| 2 | Norway | 3 | 2 | 0 | 1 | 10 | 5 | +5 | 6 | Advance to knockout stage |
| 3 | France | 3 | 1 | 1 | 1 | 2 | 3 | −1 | 4 | |
| 4 | South Korea | 3 | 0 | 0 | 3 | 1 | 11 | −10 | 0 | |

Source: FIFA
Rules for classification: Group stage tiebreakers
September 20, 2003
12:00 EDT (UTC−4)

| Norway | 2–0 | France |
|---|---|---|
| Rapp 47'; Mellgren 66' | Report |

Lincoln Financial Field, Philadelphia
Attendance: 24,347
Referee: Kari Seitz (United States)
September 24, 2003
19:45 EDT (UTC−4)

| France | 1–0 | South Korea |
|---|---|---|
| Pichon 84' | Report |

Robert F. Kennedy Memorial Stadium, Washington, D.C.
Attendance: 16,316
Referee: Zhang Dongqing (China PR)
September 27, 2003
12:45 EDT (UTC−4)

| France | 1–1 | Brazil |
|---|---|---|
| Pichon 90+2' | Report | Kátia 58' |

Robert F. Kennedy Memorial Stadium, Washington, D.C.
Attendance: 17,618
Referee: Cristina Ionescu (Romania)

== 2011 FIFA Women's World Cup ==
=== Group A ===
| Pos | Team | Pld | W | D | L | GF | GA | GD | Pts | Qualification |
|---|---|---|---|---|---|---|---|---|---|---|
| 1 | Germany (H) | 3 | 3 | 0 | 0 | 7 | 3 | +4 | 9 | Advance to knockout stage |
| 2 | France | 3 | 2 | 0 | 1 | 7 | 4 | +3 | 6 | Advance to knockout stage |
| 3 | Nigeria | 3 | 1 | 0 | 2 | 1 | 2 | −1 | 3 | |
| 4 | Canada | 3 | 0 | 0 | 3 | 1 | 7 | −6 | 0 | |

Source: FIFA
Rules for classification: Group stage tiebreakers
(H) Hosts
26 June 2011
15:00

| Nigeria | 0–1 | France |
|---|---|---|
| | Report | Delie 56' |

Rhein-Neckar-Arena, Sinsheim
Attendance: 25,475
Referee: Kari Seitz (United States)
30 June 2011
18:00

| Canada | 0–4 | France |
|---|---|---|
| | Report | Thiney 24', 60'; Abily 66'; Thomis 83' |

Ruhrstadion, Bochum
Attendance: 16,591
Referee: Etsuko Fukano (Japan)
5 July 2011
20:45

| France | 2–4 | Germany |
|---|---|---|
| Delie 56'; Georges 72' | Report | Garefrekes 25'; Grings 32', 68' (pen.); Okoyino da Mbabi 89' |

Borussia-Park, Mönchengladbach
Attendance: 45,867
Referee: Kirsi Heikkinen (Finland)

=== Quarterfinals ===
9 July 2011
18:00

| England | 1–1 (a.e.t.) | France |
|---|---|---|
| J. Scott 59' | Report | Bussaglia 88' |
Penalties
| Smith (penalty scored); Carney (penalty scored); Stoney (penalty scored); Rafferty (penalty missed); F. White (penalty missed) | 3–4 | (penalty missed) Abily; (penalty scored) Bussaglia; (penalty scored) Thiney; (penalty scored) Bompastor; (penalty scored) Le Sommer |

BayArena, Leverkusen
Attendance: 26,395
Referee: Jenny Palmqvist (Sweden)

=== Semifinals ===
13 July 2011
18:00

| France | 1–3 | United States |
|---|---|---|
| Bompastor 55' | Report | Cheney 9'; Wambach 79'; Morgan 82' |

Borussia-Park, Mönchengladbach
Attendance: 25,676
Referee: Kirsi Heikkinen (Finland)

=== Third place match ===
16 July 2011
17:30

| Sweden | 2–1 | France |
|---|---|---|
| Schelin 29'; M. Hammarström 82' | Report | Thomis 56' |

Rhein-Neckar-Arena, Sinsheim
Attendance: 25,475
Referee: Kari Seitz (United States)

== 2015 FIFA Women's World Cup ==
=== Group F ===
| Pos | Team | Pld | W | D | L | GF | GA | GD | Pts | Qualification |
|---|---|---|---|---|---|---|---|---|---|---|
| 1 | France | 3 | 2 | 0 | 1 | 6 | 2 | +4 | 6 | Advance to knockout stage |
| 2 | England | 3 | 2 | 0 | 1 | 4 | 3 | +1 | 6 | Advance to knockout stage |
| 3 | Colombia | 3 | 1 | 1 | 1 | 4 | 3 | +1 | 4 | Advance to knockout stage |
| 4 | Mexico | 3 | 0 | 1 | 2 | 2 | 8 | −6 | 1 | |

Source: FIFA
Rules for classification: Group stage tiebreakers
9 June 2015
14:00 ADT (UTC−3)

| France | 1–0 | England |
|---|---|---|
| Le Sommer 29' | Report |

Moncton Stadium, Moncton
Attendance: 11,686
Referee: Efthalia Mitsi (Greece)
13 June 2015
14:00 ADT (UTC−3)

| France | 0–2 | Colombia |
|---|---|---|
| | Report | Andrade 19'; Usme 90+3' |

Moncton Stadium, Moncton
Attendance: 13,138
Referee: Qin Liang (China PR)
17 June 2015
16:00 EDT (UTC−4)

| Mexico | 0–5 | France |
|---|---|---|
| | Report | Delie 1'; Ruiz 9' (o.g.); Le Sommer 13', 36'; Henry 80' |

TD Place Stadium, Ottawa
Attendance: 21,562
Referee: Sachiko Yamagishi (Japan)

=== Round of 16 ===
21 June 2015
16:00 EDT (UTC−4)

| France | 3–0 | South Korea |
|---|---|---|
| Delie 4', 48'; Thomis 8' | Report |

Olympic Stadium, Montreal
Attendance: 15,518
Referee: Salomé di Iorio (Argentina)

=== Quarterfinals ===
26 June 2015
16:00 EDT (UTC−4)

| Germany | 1–1 (a.e.t.) | France |
|---|---|---|
| Šašić 84' (pen.) | Report | Nécib 64' |
Penalties
| Behringer (penalty scored); Laudehr (penalty scored); Peter (penalty scored); Marozsán (penalty scored); Šašić (penalty scored) | 5–4 | (penalty scored) Thiney; (penalty scored) Abily; (penalty scored) Nécib; (penalty scored) Renard; (penalty missed) Lavogez |

Olympic Stadium, Montreal
Attendance: 24,859
Referee: Carol Anne Chenard (Canada)

== 2019 FIFA Women's World Cup ==
=== Group A ===
| Pos | Team | Pld | W | D | L | GF | GA | GD | Pts | Qualification |
|---|---|---|---|---|---|---|---|---|---|---|
| 1 | France (H) | 3 | 3 | 0 | 0 | 7 | 1 | +6 | 9 | Advance to knockout stage |
| 2 | Norway | 3 | 2 | 0 | 1 | 6 | 3 | +3 | 6 | Advance to knockout stage |
| 3 | Nigeria | 3 | 1 | 0 | 2 | 2 | 4 | −2 | 3 | Advance to knockout stage |
| 4 | South Korea | 3 | 0 | 0 | 3 | 1 | 8 | −7 | 0 | |

Source: FIFA
Rules for classification: Group stage tiebreakers
(H) Hosts
7 June 2019
21:00

| France | 4–0 | South Korea |
|---|---|---|
| Le Sommer 9'; Renard 35', 45+2'; Henry 85' | Report |

Parc des Princes, Paris
Attendance: 45,261
Referee: Claudia Umpiérrez (Uruguay)
12 June 2019
21:00

| France | 2–1 | Norway |
|---|---|---|
| Gauvin 46'; Le Sommer 72' (pen.) | Report | Renard 54' (o.g.) |

Allianz Riviera, Nice
Attendance: 34,872
Referee: Bibiana Steinhaus (Germany)
17 June 2019
21:00

| Nigeria | 0–1 | France |
|---|---|---|
| | Report | Renard 79' (pen.) |

Roazhon Park, Rennes
Attendance: 28,267
Referee: Melissa Borjas (Honduras)

=== Round of 16 ===
23 June 2019
21:00

| France | 2–1 (a.e.t.) | Brazil |
|---|---|---|
| Gauvin 52'; Henry 107' | Report | Thaisa 63' |

Stade Océane, Le Havre
Attendance: 23,965
Referee: Marie-Soleil Beaudoin (Canada)

=== Quarterfinals ===
28 June 2019
21:00

| France | 1–2 | United States |
|---|---|---|
| Renard 81' | Report | Rapinoe 5', 65' |

Parc des Princes, Paris
Attendance: 45,595
Referee: Kateryna Monzul (Ukraine)

== 2023 FIFA Women's World Cup ==
=== Group F ===
| Pos | Team | Pld | W | D | L | GF | GA | GD | Pts | Qualification |
|---|---|---|---|---|---|---|---|---|---|---|
| 1 | France | 3 | 2 | 1 | 0 | 8 | 4 | +4 | 7 | Advance to knockout stage |
| 2 | Jamaica | 3 | 1 | 2 | 0 | 1 | 0 | +1 | 5 | Advance to knockout stage |
| 3 | Brazil | 3 | 1 | 1 | 1 | 5 | 2 | +3 | 4 | |
| 4 | Panama | 3 | 0 | 0 | 3 | 3 | 11 | −8 | 0 | |

Source: FIFA
Rules for classification: Group stage tiebreakers
23 July 2023
20:00 UTC+10

| France | 0–0 | Jamaica |
|---|---|---|
| | Report |

Sydney Football Stadium, Sydney
Attendance: 39,045
Referee: María Carvajal (Chile)

29 July 2023
20:00 UTC+10

| France | 2–1 | Brazil |
|---|---|---|
| Le Sommer 17'; Renard 83' | Report | Debinha 58' |

Lang Park, Brisbane
Attendance: 49,378
Referee: Kate Jacewicz (Australia)

2 August 2023
20:00 UTC+10

| Panama | 3–6 | France |
|---|---|---|
| Cox 2'; Pinzón 64' (pen.); L. Cedeño 87' | Report | Lakrar 21'; Diani 28', 37' (pen.), 52' (pen.); Le Garrec 45+5'; Bècho 90+10' |

Sydney Football Stadium, Sydney
Attendance: 40,498
Referee: Laura Fortunato (Argentina)

=== Round of 16 ===
8 August 2023
20:30 UTC+9:30

| France | 4–0 | Morocco |
|---|---|---|
| Diani 15'; Dali 20'; Le Sommer 23', 70' | Report |

Hindmarsh Stadium, Adelaide
Attendance: 13,557
Referee: Tori Penso (United States)

=== Quarter-finals ===
12 August 2023
17:00 UTC+10

| Australia | 0–0 (a.e.t.) | France |
|---|---|---|
| | Report |
Penalties
| Foord (penalty scored); Catley (penalty missed); Kerr (penalty scored); Fowler (penalty scored); Arnold (penalty missed); Gorry (penalty scored); Yallop (penalty scored); Carpenter (penalty scored); Hunt (penalty missed); Vine (penalty scored) | 7–6 | (penalty missed) Bacha; (penalty scored) Diani; (penalty scored) Renard; (penalty scored) Le Sommer; (penalty missed) Périsset; (penalty scored) Geyoro; (penalty scored) Karchaoui; (penalty scored) Lakrar; (penalty missed) Dali; (penalty missed) Bècho |

Lang Park, Brisbane
Attendance: 49,461
Referee: María Carvajal (Chile)

== Goalscorers ==
| Player | Goals | 2003 | 2011 | 2015 | 2019 | 2023 | 2027 |
|---|---|---|---|---|---|---|---|
| Eugénie Le Sommer | 8 | | | 3 | 2 | 3 | |
| Marie-Laure Delie | 5 | | 2 | 3 | | | |
| Wendie Renard | 5 | | | | 4 | 1 | |
| Kadidiatou Diani | 4 | | | | | 4 | |
| Élodie Thomis | 3 | | 2 | 1 | | | |
| Amandine Henry | 3 | | | 1 | 2 | | |
| Marinette Pichon | 2 | 2 | | | | | |
| Gaëtane Thiney | 2 | | 2 | | | | |
| Valérie Gauvin | 2 | | | | 2 | | |
| Camille Abily | 1 | | 1 | | | | |
| Laura Georges | 1 | | 1 | | | | |
| Élise Bussaglia | 1 | | 1 | | | | |
| Sonia Bompastor | 1 | | 1 | | | | |
| Louisa Cadamuro | 1 | | | 1 | | | |
| Maëlle Lakrar | 1 | | | | | 1 | |
| Léa Le Garrec | 1 | | | | | 1 | |
| Vicki Bècho | 1 | | | | | 1 | |
| Kenza Dali | 1 | | | | | 1 | |
| Own goals | 1 | | | 1 | | | |
| Total | 44 | 2 | 10 | 10 | 10 | 12 | |

Own goals scored for opponents

- Wendie Renard (scored for Norway in 2019)

== See also ==
- France at the UEFA Women's Championship

== Head-to-head record ==
| Opponent | Pld | W | D | L | GF | GA | GD | Win % |
|---|---|---|---|---|---|---|---|---|
| Australia | 1 | 0 | 1 | 0 | 0 | 0 | +0 | 0.00 |
| Brazil | 3 | 2 | 1 | 0 | 5 | 3 | +2 | 66.67 |
| Canada | 1 | 1 | 0 | 0 | 4 | 0 | +4 | 100.00 |
| Colombia | 1 | 0 | 0 | 1 | 0 | 2 | −2 | 0.00 |
| England | 2 | 1 | 1 | 0 | 2 | 1 | +1 | 50.00 |
| Germany | 2 | 0 | 1 | 1 | 3 | 5 | −2 | 0.00 |
| Jamaica | 1 | 0 | 1 | 0 | 0 | 0 | +0 | 0.00 |
| Mexico | 1 | 1 | 0 | 0 | 5 | 0 | +5 | 100.00 |
| Morocco | 1 | 1 | 0 | 0 | 4 | 0 | +4 | 100.00 |
| Nigeria | 2 | 2 | 0 | 0 | 2 | 0 | +2 | 100.00 |
| Norway | 2 | 1 | 0 | 1 | 2 | 3 | −1 | 50.00 |
| Panama | 1 | 1 | 0 | 0 | 6 | 3 | +3 | 100.00 |
| South Korea | 3 | 3 | 0 | 0 | 8 | 0 | +8 | 100.00 |
| Sweden | 1 | 0 | 0 | 1 | 1 | 2 | −1 | 0.00 |
| United States | 2 | 0 | 0 | 2 | 2 | 5 | −3 | 0.00 |
| Total | 24 | 13 | 5 | 6 | 44 | 24 | +20 | 54.17 |
