= List of FIFA Women's World Cup opening matches =

The FIFA Women's World Cup is an international association football competition established in 1991. It is contested by the women's national teams of the members of Fédération Internationale de Football Association (FIFA), the sport's global governing body. The tournament has taken place every four years.

The World Cup opening match is the first of the competition. Opening match regulations have changed many times. Five times the opening matches involved the host nations and one time involved the defending champion.

== List of opening matches ==
Year	Team 1	Final score	Team 2	Venue	Location	Attendance	References	Notes
1991	China	4–0	Norway	Tianhe Stadium	Guangzhou, China	65,000	Report	China is host country
1995	Germany	1–0	Japan	Tingvalla IP	Karlstad, Sweden	3,824	Report	
1999	United States	3–0	Denmark	Giants Stadium	East Rutherford, United States	78,972	Report	United States is host country
2003	Norway	2–0	France	Lincoln Financial Field	Philadelphia, United States	24,347	Report	
2007	Germany	11–0	Argentina	Hongkou Football Stadium	Shanghai, China	28,098	Report	Germany is defending champion
2011	France	1–0	Nigeria	Rhein-Neckar-Arena	Sinsheim, Germany	25,475	Report	
2015	Canada	1–0	China	Commonwealth Stadium	Edmonton, Canada	53,058	Report	Canada is host country
2019	France	4–0	South Korea	Parc des Princes	Paris, France	45,261	Report	France is host country
2023	New Zealand	1–0	Norway	Eden Park	Auckland, New Zealand	42,137	Report	New Zealand is a host country
2027	Brazil	–	TBA	Maracanã Stadium	Rio de Janeiro, Brazil			Brazil is a host country

== See also ==
- List of FIFA Women's World Cup finals
