= 2003 FIFA Women's World Cup Group B =

Football tournament group stage

Group B of the 2003 FIFA Women's World Cup was one of four groups of nations, consisting of Brazil, France, Norway and South Korea. It began on September 20 and ended on September 27. Rising power Brazil topped the group, comfortably beating South Korea and Norway by large margins and were denied a 100% record by Marinette Pichon's last minute equalizer against France. Brazil were joined in the second round by Norway, who won their other two games against France and South Korea, both which were making their debut at the World Cup.

== Standings ==
Pos	Team	Pld	W	D	L	GF	GA	GD	Pts	Qualification
1	Brazil	3	2	1	0	8	2	+6	7	Advance to knockout stage
2	Norway	3	2	0	1	10	5	+5	6	Advance to knockout stage
3	France	3	1	1	1	2	3	−1	4	
4	South Korea	3	0	0	3	1	11	−10	0	

Source: FIFA
Rules for classification: Group stage tiebreakers

== Matches ==
All times local (EDT/UTC–4)

=== Norway vs France ===
September 20, 2003
12:00

Norway	2–0	France
Rapp 47'; Mellgren 66'	Report

Lincoln Financial Field, Philadelphia
Attendance: 24,347
Referee: Kari Seitz (United States)

GK	1	Bente Nordby
DF	2	Brit Sandaune
DF	3	Ane Stangeland Horpestad
DF	4	Monica Knudsen
DF	16	Gunhild Følstad
DF	14	Dagny Mellgren (c)
MF	10	Unni Lehn		(substituted off) 89'
MF	8	Solveig Gulbrandsen		(substituted off) 80'
MF	20	Lise Klaveness	(yellow card) 90+1'
FW	9	Anita Rapp	(yellow card) 86'
FW	11	Marianne Pettersen		(substituted off) 90+1'
Substitutions:
DF	7	Trine Rønning		(substituted in) 80'
MF	6	Hege Riise		(substituted in) 89'
FW	17	Linda Ørmen		(substituted in) 90+1'
Manager:
Åge Steen

GK	1	Celine Marty
DF	2	Sabrina Viguier
DF	3	Peggy Provost
DF	4	Laura Georges
DF	5	Corinne Diacre (c)
MF	6	Sandrine Soubeyrand
MF	8	Sonia Bompastor
MF	10	Élodie Woock
FW	18	Hoda Lattaf	(substituted off) 72'
FW	7	Stéphanie Mugneret-Béghé	(substituted off) 82'
FW	9	Marinette Pichon
Substitutions:
FW	15	Laëtitia Tonazzi	(substituted in) 72'
FW	17	Marie-Ange Kramo	(substituted in) 82'
Manager:
Élisabeth Loisel

Player of the Match:
Dagny Mellgren (Norway)

Assistant referees:
Karalee Sutton (United States)
Sharon Wheeler (United States)
Fourth official:
Tammy Ogston (Australia)

=== Brazil vs South Korea ===
September 21, 2003
15:15

Brazil	3–0	South Korea
Marta 14' (pen.); Kátia 55', 62'	Report

Robert F. Kennedy Memorial Stadium, Washington, D.C.
Attendance: 34,144
Referee: Tammy Ogston (Australia)

GK	1	Andréia
DF	3	Juliana (c)
DF	4	Tânia
MF	5	Renata Costa
MF	18	Daniela
MF	16	Maycon		(substituted off) 78'
MF	17	Kátia
FW	14	Rosana
FW	2	Simone
FW	7	Formiga	(yellow card) 2'	(substituted off) 89'
FW	10	Marta
Substitutions:
FW	11	Cristiane		(substituted in) 78'
MF	19	Priscila		(substituted in) 89'
Manager:
Paulo Gonçalves

GK	12	Kim Jung-Mi
DF	4	Kim Yeo-Jin
DF	18	Kim Yoo-Mi	(yellow card) 22'	(substituted off) 46'
DF	20	Yoo Young-Sil (c)
MF	16	Shin Sun-Nam
MF	15	Kim Kyul-Sil		(substituted off) 65'
MF	9	Song Ju-Hee
MF	10	Kim Jin-Hee		(substituted off) 49'
MF	14	Han Jin-Sook
FW	7	Park Eun-Sun
FW	11	Lee Ji-Eun
Substitutions:
DF	6	Jin Suk-Hee	(yellow card) 71'	(substituted in) 46'
FW	17	Sung Hyun-Ah		(substituted in) 49'
MF	8	Hwang In-Sun		(substituted in) 65'
Manager:
Ahn Jong-Kwan

Player of the Match:
Marta (Brazil)

Assistant referees:
Irina Mirt (Romania)
Katarzyna Nadolska (Poland)
Fourth official:
Xonam Agboyi (Togo)

=== Norway vs Brazil ===
September 24, 2003
17:00

Norway	1–4	Brazil
Pettersen 45'	Report	Daniela 26'; Rosana 37'; Marta 59'; Kátia 68'

Robert F. Kennedy Memorial Stadium, Washington, D.C.
Attendance: 16,316
Referee: Xonam Agboyi (Togo)

GK	1	Bente Nordby
DF	2	Brit Sandaune
DF	3	Ane Stangeland Horpestad
DF	4	Monica Knudsen
DF	16	Gunhild Følstad
DF	7	Trine Rønning	(yellow card) 77'
DF	14	Dagny Mellgren (c)
MF	10	Unni Lehn		(substituted off) 74'
MF	8	Solveig Gulbrandsen		(substituted off) 74'
FW	9	Anita Rapp		(substituted off) 46'
FW	11	Marianne Pettersen
Substitutions:
FW	17	Linda Ørmen		(substituted in) 46'
MF	6	Hege Riise		(substituted in) 74'
MF	20	Lise Klaveness		(substituted in) 74'
Manager:
Åge Steen

GK	1	Andréia
DF	3	Juliana (c)
DF	4	Tânia
MF	5	Renata Costa	(yellow card) 51'
MF	18	Daniela		(substituted off) 90'
MF	16	Maycon		(substituted off) 80'
MF	17	Kátia
FW	14	Rosana
FW	2	Simone
FW	7	Formiga		(substituted off) 88'
FW	10	Marta
Substitutions:
FW	11	Cristiane		(substituted in) 80'
MF	8	Rafaela		(substituted in) 88'
MF	19	Priscila		(substituted in) 90'
Manager:
Paulo Gonçalves

Player of the Match:
Daniela (Brazil)

Assistant referees:
Désirée Perpétué (Ivory Coast)
Florence Biagui (Senegal)
Fourth official:
Sonia Denoncourt (Canada)

=== France vs South Korea ===
September 24, 2003
19:45

France	1–0	South Korea
Pichon 84'	Report

Robert F. Kennedy Memorial Stadium, Washington, D.C.
Attendance: 16,316
Referee: Zhang Dongqing (China PR)

GK	1	Celine Marty
DF	13	Anne-Laure Casseleux		(substituted off) 81'
DF	3	Peggy Provost
DF	4	Laura Georges
DF	5	Corinne Diacre (c)	(yellow card) 65'
MF	6	Sandrine Soubeyrand
MF	8	Sonia Bompastor
MF	10	Élodie Woock	(yellow card) 37'	(substituted off) 89'
FW	17	Marie-Ange Kramo
FW	7	Stéphanie Mugneret-Béghé		(substituted off) 68'
FW	9	Marinette Pichon
Substitutions:
FW	15	Laëtitia Tonazzi		(substituted in) 68'
DF	20	Emmanuelle Sykora		(substituted in) 81'
MF	14	Virginie Dessalle		(substituted in) 89'
Manager:
Élisabeth Loisel

GK	12	Kim Jung-Mi
DF	4	Kim Yeo-Jin
DF	18	Kim Yoo-Mi
DF	20	Yoo Young-Sil (c)	(yellow card) 45'	(substituted off) 83'
MF	16	Shin Sun-Nam		(substituted off) 85'
MF	15	Kim Kyul-Sil		(substituted off) 75'
MF	9	Song Ju-Hee
MF	10	Kim Jin-Hee
MF	14	Han Jin-Sook
FW	7	Park Eun-Sun
FW	11	Lee Ji-Eun
Substitutions:
MF	19	Lee Myung-Hwa	(yellow card) 83'	(substituted in) 75'
DF	6	Jin Suk-Hee		(substituted in) 83'
MF	2	Kim Joo-Hee		(substituted in) 85'
Manager:
Ahn Jong-Kwan

Player of the Match:
Celine Marty (France)

Assistant referees:
Liu Hsiu-mei (Chinese Taipei)
Hisae Yoshizawa (Japan)
Fourth official:
Sonia Denoncourt (Canada)

=== South Korea vs Norway ===
September 27, 2003
12:45

South Korea	1–7	Norway
Kim Jin-hee 75'	Report	Gulbrandsen 5'; Mellgren 24', 31'; Pettersen 40'; Sandaune 52'; Ørmen 80', 90'

Gillette Stadium, Foxborough
Attendance: 14,356
Referee: Tammy Ogston (Australia)

GK	12	Kim Jung-Mi
DF	4	Kim Yeo-Jin	(substituted off) 55'
DF	18	Kim Yoo-Mi
DF	20	Yoo Young-Sil (c)
MF	2	Kim Joo-Hee
MF	15	Kim Kyul-Sil
MF	9	Song Ju-Hee
MF	10	Kim Jin-Hee
MF	14	Han Jin-Sook	(substituted off) 30'
FW	7	Park Eun-Sun	(substituted off) 59'
FW	11	Lee Ji-Eun
Substitutions:
MF	13	Kim Yoo-Jin	(substituted in) 30'
DF	6	Jin Suk-Hee	(substituted in) 55'
MF	3	Hong Kyung-Suk	(substituted in) 59'
Manager:
Ahn Jong-Kwan

GK	1	Bente Nordby
DF	2	Brit Sandaune
DF	3	Ane Stangeland Horpestad
DF	4	Monica Knudsen
DF	15	Marit Fiane Christensen
DF	7	Trine Rønning	(substituted off) 69'
DF	14	Dagny Mellgren (c)
MF	10	Unni Lehn
MF	8	Solveig Gulbrandsen	(substituted off) 73'
FW	20	Lise Klaveness	(substituted off) 81'
FW	11	Marianne Pettersen
Substitutions:
FW	17	Linda Ørmen	(substituted in) 69'
FW	18	Ingrid Fosse	(substituted in) 73'
MF	6	Hege Riise	(substituted in) 81'
Manager:
Åge Steen

Player of the Match:
Dagny Mellgren (Norway)

Assistant referees:
Airlie Keen (Australia)
Jacqueline Leleu (Australia)
Fourth official:
Nicole Petignat (Switzerland)

=== France vs Brazil ===
September 27, 2003
12:45

France	1–1	Brazil
Pichon 90+2'	Report	Kátia 58'

Robert F. Kennedy Memorial Stadium, Washington, D.C.
Attendance: 17,618
Referee: Cristina Ionescu (Romania)

GK	1	Celine Marty
DF	2	Sabrina Viguier		(substituted off) 85'
DF	3	Peggy Provost	(yellow card) 72'
DF	4	Laura Georges
DF	5	Corinne Diacre (c)
MF	6	Sandrine Soubeyrand
MF	8	Sonia Bompastor
MF	10	Élodie Woock		(substituted off) 73'
FW	17	Marie-Ange Kramo
FW	7	Stéphanie Mugneret-Béghé		(substituted off) 46'
FW	9	Marinette Pichon
Substitutions:
FW	15	Laëtitia Tonazzi		(substituted in) 46'
MF	11	Amélie Coquet		(substituted in) 73'
FW	18	Hoda Lattaf		(substituted in) 85'
Manager:
Élisabeth Loisel

GK	1	Andréia (c)
DF	3	Juliana
DF	4	Tânia		(substituted off) 88'
MF	8	Rafaela
MF	18	Daniela	(yellow card) 51'
MF	16	Maycon
MF	19	Priscila		(substituted off) 46'
MF	17	Kátia
FW	14	Rosana
FW	2	Simone
FW	10	Marta
Substitutions:
FW	11	Cristiane		(substituted in) 46'
DF	13	Mônica		(substituted in) 88'
Manager:
Paulo Gonçalves

Player of the Match:
Maycon (Brazil)

Assistant referees:
Irina Mirt (Romania)
Katarzyna Nadolska (Poland)
Fourth official:
Sandra Hunt (United States)

== See also ==
- Brazil at the FIFA Women's World Cup
- France at the FIFA Women's World Cup
- Norway at the FIFA Women's World Cup
- South Korea at the FIFA Women's World Cup
