= Norway at the UEFA Women's Championship =

Norway have participated 12 times at the UEFA Women's Championship: They have won two UEFA Women's Championships (1987, 1993). Norways largest defeat at the UEFA Women's Championship was 8-0.

== UEFA Women's Championship ==
UEFA Women's Championship record								Qualifying record							
Year	Result	Match	Win	Draw*	Loss	GF	GA	Match	Win	Draw*	Loss	GF	GA	P/R	Rnk
1984	Did not qualify							6	3	1	2	10	6		
(Norway) 1987	Champions	2	2	0	0	4	1	6	3	3	0	12	6		
(West Germany) 1989	Runners-up	2	1	0	1	3	5	8	4	1	3	15	11		
(Denmark) 1991	Runners-up	2	0	1	1	1	3	8	7	1	0	16	1		
(Italy) 1993	Champions	2	2	0	0	2	0	6	5	1	0	30	0		
(England) (Germany) (Norway) (Sweden) 1995	Semifinals	2	1	0	1	5	7	8	7	1	0	40	6		
(Norway) 1997	Group stage	3	1	1	1	5	2	6	5	1	0	33	1		
(Germany) 2001	Semifinals	4	1	1	2	4	3	6	6	0	0	25	0		
(England) 2005	Runners-up	5	2	1	2	10	10	10	8	1	1	31	7		
(Finland) 2009	Semifinals	5	2	1	2	6	9	8	7	1	0	26	0		
(Sweden) 2013	Runners-up	6	3	2	1	7	4	10	8	0	2	35	9		
(Netherlands) 2017	Group stage	3	0	0	3	0	4	8	7	1	0	29	2		
(England) 2022	Group stage	3	1	0	2	4	10	6	6	0	0	34	1		
(Switzerland) 2025	Quarter-finals	4	3	0	1	9	7	10	5	4	1	28	4	(Note: From Euro 2025 onwards a new qualifying format was introduced, linked to the Women's Nations League where teams are divided into leagues with promotion/relegation between the leagues at the end of each cycle.)	10th
Total	12/13	43	19	7	17	60	65	106	81	16	9	364	54	10th	

*Draws include knockout matches decided on penalty kicks.

== See also ==
- Norway at the FIFA Women's World Cup
