= 2019 FIFA Women's World Cup Group A =

Football tournament group stage

Group A of the 2019 FIFA Women's World Cup took place from 7 to 17 June 2019. The group consisted of hosts France, Nigeria, Norway and South Korea. The top two teams, France and Norway, along with the third-placed team, Nigeria (as one of the four best third-placed teams), advanced to the round of 16.

== Teams ==
Draw position	Team	Pot	Confederation	Method of qualification	Date of qualification	Finals appearance	Last appearance	Previous best performance	FIFA Rankings	
Draw position	Team	Pot	Confederation	Method of qualification	Date of qualification	Finals appearance	Last appearance	Previous best performance	December 2018 (Note: The rankings of December 2018 were used for seeding for the final draw.)	March 2019
A1	France	1	UEFA	Hosts	19 March 2015	4th	2015	Fourth place (2011)	3	4
A2	South Korea	3	AFC	AFC Women's Asian Cup playoff Winner	16 April 2018	3rd	2015	Round of 16 (2015)	14	14
A3	Norway	2	UEFA	UEFA Group 3 winners	4 September 2018	8th	2015	Winners (1995)	13	12
A4	Nigeria	4	CAF	Africa Women Cup of Nations champions	27 November 2018	8th	2015	Quarter-finals (1999)	39	38

== Standings ==
Pos	Team	Pld	W	D	L	GF	GA	GD	Pts	Qualification
1	France (H)	3	3	0	0	7	1	+6	9	Advance to knockout stage
2	Norway	3	2	0	1	6	3	+3	6	Advance to knockout stage
3	Nigeria	3	1	0	2	2	4	−2	3	Advance to knockout stage
4	South Korea	3	0	0	3	1	8	−7	0	

Source: FIFA
Rules for classification: Group stage tiebreakers
(H) Hosts

In the round of 16:

- The winners of Group A, France, advanced to play the third-placed team of Group C, Brazil.
- The runners-up of Group A, Norway, advanced to play the runners-up of Group C, Australia.
- The third-placed team of Group A, Nigeria, advanced to play the winners of Group B, Germany (as one of the four best third-placed teams).

== Matches ==
All times listed are local, CEST (UTC+2).

=== France vs South Korea ===
7 June 2019
21:00

France	4–0	South Korea
Le Sommer 9'; Renard 35', 45+2'; Henry 85'	Report

Parc des Princes, Paris
Attendance: 45,261
Referee: Claudia Umpiérrez (Uruguay)

France	South Korea

GK	16	Sarah Bouhaddi
RB	4	Marion Torrent
CB	19	Griedge Mbock Bathy
CB	3	Wendie Renard
LB	10	Amel Majri	(substituted off) 74'
CM	6	Amandine Henry (c)
CM	17	Gaëtane Thiney	(substituted off) 86'
CM	15	Élise Bussaglia
RF	20	Delphine Cascarino	(substituted off) 70'
CF	11	Kadidiatou Diani
LF	9	Eugénie Le Sommer
Substitutions:
FW	13	Valérie Gauvin	(substituted on) 70'
DF	2	Ève Périsset	(substituted on) 74'
MF	8	Grace Geyoro	(substituted on) 86'
Manager:
Corinne Diacre

GK	18	Kim Min-jeong
RB	20	Kim Hye-ri
CB	4	Hwang Bo-ram
CB	5	Kim Do-yeon
LB	16	Jang Sel-gi
CM	15	Lee Young-ju	(substituted off) 69'
CM	10	Ji So-yun
CM	8	Cho So-hyun (c)
RF	12	Kang Yu-mi	(substituted off) 52'
CF	11	Jung Seol-bin	(substituted off) 86'
LF	17	Lee Geum-min
Substitutions:
MF	23	Kang Chae-rim	(substituted on) 52'
MF	7	Lee Min-a	(substituted on) 69'
FW	13	Yeo Min-ji	(substituted on) 86'
Manager:
Yoon Deok-yeo

Player of the Match:
Wendie Renard (France)

Assistant referees:
Luciana Mascaraña (Uruguay)
Mónica Amboya (Ecuador)
Fourth official:
Melissa Borjas (Honduras)
Reserve assistant referee:
Mariana de Almeida (Argentina)
Video assistant referee:
Mauro Vigliano (Argentina)
Assistant video assistant referees:
José María Sánchez Martínez (Spain)
Felisha Mariscal (United States)

=== Norway vs Nigeria ===
8 June 2019
21:00

Norway	3–0	Nigeria
Reiten 17'; Utland 34'; Ohale 37' (o.g.)	Report

Stade Auguste-Delaune, Reims
Attendance: 11,058
Referee: Kate Jacewicz (Australia)

Norway	Nigeria

GK	1	Ingrid Hjelmseth
RB	2	Ingrid Moe Wold
CB	6	Maren Mjelde (c)
CB	3	Maria Thorisdottir
LB	17	Kristine Minde
RM	10	Caroline Graham Hansen
CM	8	Vilde Bøe Risa	(substituted off) 84'
CM	14	Ingrid Syrstad Engen
LM	16	Guro Reiten	(substituted off) 90+1'
CF	9	Isabell Herlovsen
CF	11	Lisa-Marie Utland	(substituted off) 80'
Substitutions:
FW	7	Elise Thorsnes	(substituted on) 80'
MF	18	Frida Maanum	(substituted on) 84'
FW	20	Emilie Haavi	(substituted on) 90+1'
Manager:
(Sweden) Martin Sjögren

GK	1	Tochukwu Oluehi
RB	14	Faith Michael		(substituted off) 54'
CB	3	Osinachi Ohale
CB	5	Onome Ebi
LB	4	Ngozi Ebere
CM	18	Halimatu Ayinde		(substituted off) 51'
CM	13	Ngozi Okobi-Okeoghene
CM	10	Rita Chikwelu
RF	8	Asisat Oshoala
CF	9	Desire Oparanozie (c)	(yellow card) 13'	(substituted off) 71'
LF	17	Francisca Ordega	(yellow card) 45+1'
Substitutions:
FW	11	Chinaza Uchendu		(substituted on) 51'
DF	20	Chidinma Okeke		(substituted on) 54'
FW	12	Uchenna Kanu		(substituted on) 71'
Manager:
(Sweden) Thomas Dennerby

Player of the Match:
Guro Reiten (Norway)

Assistant referees:
Kathryn Nesbitt (United States)
Chantal Boudreau (Canada)
Fourth official:
Casey Reibelt (Australia)
Reserve assistant referee:
Maiko Hagio (Japan)
Video assistant referee:
Danny Makkelie (Netherlands)
Assistant video assistant referees:
Mohammed Abdulla Hassan Mohamed (United Arab Emirates)
Sian Massey-Ellis (England)

=== Nigeria vs South Korea ===
12 June 2019
15:00

Nigeria	2–0	South Korea
Kim Do-yeon 29' (o.g.); Oshoala 75'	Report

Stade des Alpes, Grenoble
Attendance: 11,252
Referee: Anastasia Pustovoitova (Russia)

Nigeria	South Korea

GK	16	Chiamaka Nnadozie
RB	20	Chidinma Okeke
CB	3	Osinachi Ohale
CB	5	Onome Ebi
LB	4	Ngozi Ebere
CM	11	Chinaza Uchendu		(substituted off) 65'
CM	13	Ngozi Okobi-Okeoghene
CM	10	Rita Chikwelu	(yellow card) 61'
RF	8	Asisat Oshoala		(substituted off) 83'
CF	9	Desire Oparanozie (c)
LF	17	Francisca Ordega		(substituted off) 80'
Substitutions:
MF	18	Halimatu Ayinde		(substituted on) 65'
FW	7	Anam Imo		(substituted on) 80'
FW	12	Uchenna Kanu		(substituted on) 83'
Manager:
(Sweden) Thomas Dennerby

GK	18	Kim Min-jeong
RB	20	Kim Hye-ri
CB	4	Hwang Bo-ram	(yellow card) 71'
CB	5	Kim Do-yeon
LB	16	Jang Sel-gi
DM	8	Cho So-hyun (c)
CM	7	Lee Min-a		(substituted off) 56'
CM	10	Ji So-yun	(yellow card) 49'
RM	23	Kang Chae-rim		(substituted off) 76'
LM	17	Lee Geum-min
CF	11	Jung Seol-bin		(substituted off) 56'
Substitutions:
FW	13	Yeo Min-ji		(substituted on) 56'
MF	9	Moon Mi-ra		(substituted on) 56'
MF	19	Lee So-dam		(substituted on) 76'
Manager:
Yoon Deok-yeo

Player of the Match:
Asisat Oshoala (Nigeria)

Assistant referees:
Ekaterina Kurochkina (Russia)
Petruța Iugulescu (Romania)
Fourth official:
Katja Koroleva (United States)
Reserve assistant referee:
Julia Magnusson (Sweden)
Video assistant referee:
Carlos del Cerro Grande (Spain)
Assistant video assistant referees:
Paolo Valeri (Italy)
Leslie Vásquez (Chile)

=== France vs Norway ===
12 June 2019
21:00

France	2–1	Norway
Gauvin 46'; Le Sommer 72' (pen.)	Report	Renard 54' (o.g.)

Allianz Riviera, Nice
Attendance: 34,872
Referee: Bibiana Steinhaus (Germany)

France	Norway

GK	16	Sarah Bouhaddi
RB	4	Marion Torrent
CB	19	Griedge Mbock Bathy
CB	3	Wendie Renard
LB	10	Amel Majri
CM	6	Amandine Henry (c)
CM	17	Gaëtane Thiney		(substituted off) 82'
CM	15	Élise Bussaglia
RF	11	Kadidiatou Diani
CF	13	Valérie Gauvin		(substituted off) 85'
LF	9	Eugénie Le Sommer	(yellow card) 56'
Substitutions:
MF	14	Charlotte Bilbault		(substituted on) 82'
FW	20	Delphine Cascarino		(substituted on) 85'
Manager:
Corinne Diacre

GK	1	Ingrid Hjelmseth
RB	2	Ingrid Moe Wold		(substituted off) 86'
CB	6	Maren Mjelde (c)
CB	3	Maria Thorisdottir
LB	17	Kristine Minde
RM	21	Karina Sævik		(substituted off) 76'
CM	8	Vilde Bøe Risa		(substituted off) 90+1'
CM	14	Ingrid Syrstad Engen	(yellow card) 71'
LM	16	Guro Reiten
CF	10	Caroline Graham Hansen
CF	9	Isabell Herlovsen
Substitutions:
FW	11	Lisa-Marie Utland		(substituted on) 76'
MF	5	Synne Skinnes Hansen		(substituted on) 86'
MF	18	Frida Maanum		(substituted on) 90+1'
Manager:
(Sweden) Martin Sjögren

Player of the Match:
Valérie Gauvin (France)

Assistant referees:
Katrin Rafalski (Germany)
Chrysoula Kourompylia (Greece)
Fourth official:
Riem Hussein (Germany)
Reserve assistant referee:
Lisa Rashid (England)
Video assistant referee:
Felix Zwayer (Germany)
Assistant video assistant referees:
Sascha Stegemann (Germany)
Chantal Boudreau (Canada)

=== Nigeria vs France ===
17 June 2019
21:00

Nigeria	0–1	France
	Report	Renard 79' (pen.)

Roazhon Park, Rennes
Attendance: 28,267
Referee: Melissa Borjas (Honduras)

Nigeria	France

GK	16	Chiamaka Nnadozie	(yellow card) 77'
RB	20	Chidinma Okeke
CB	5	Onome Ebi
CB	3	Osinachi Ohale
LB	4	Ngozi Ebere	(yellow card) 28' (yellow-red card) 75'
CM	18	Halimatu Ayinde
CM	13	Ngozi Okobi-Okeoghene
CM	10	Rita Chikwelu	(yellow card) 90+9'
RF	17	Francisca Ordega		(substituted off) 84'
CF	8	Asisat Oshoala		(substituted off) 85'
LF	9	Desire Oparanozie (c)		(substituted off) 90'
Substitutions:
MF	6	Evelyn Nwabuoku		(substituted on) 84'
FW	7	Anam Imo		(substituted on) 85'
FW	12	Uchenna Kanu		(substituted on) 90'
Manager:
(Sweden) Thomas Dennerby

GK	16	Sarah Bouhaddi
RB	2	Ève Périsset
CB	19	Griedge Mbock Bathy
CB	3	Wendie Renard
LB	10	Amel Majri
CM	6	Amandine Henry (c)
CM	17	Gaëtane Thiney		(substituted off) 89'
CM	14	Charlotte Bilbault
RF	20	Delphine Cascarino		(substituted off) 62'
CF	13	Valérie Gauvin	(yellow card) 45+1'	(substituted off) 62'
LF	18	Viviane Asseyi
Substitutions:
FW	9	Eugénie Le Sommer		(substituted on) 62'
FW	11	Kadidiatou Diani		(substituted on) 62'
MF	8	Grace Geyoro		(substituted on) 89'
Manager:
Corinne Diacre

Player of the Match:
Wendie Renard (France)

Assistant referees:
Shirley Perello (Honduras)
Felisha Mariscal (United States)
Fourth official:
María Carvajal (Chile)
Reserve assistant referee:
Leslie Vásquez (Chile)
Video assistant referee:
Danny Makkelie (Netherlands)
Assistant video assistant referees:
Paweł Gil (Poland)
Loreto Toloza (Chile)

=== South Korea vs Norway ===
17 June 2019
21:00

South Korea	1–2	Norway
Yeo Min-ji 78'	Report	Graham Hansen 5' (pen.); Herlovsen 51' (pen.)

Stade Auguste-Delaune, Reims
Attendance: 13,034
Referee: Marie-Soleil Beaudoin (Canada)

South Korea	Norway

GK	18	Kim Min-jeong
RB	2	Lee Eun-mi		(substituted off) 79'
CB	14	Shin Dam-yeong
CB	5	Kim Do-yeon
LB	16	Jang Sel-gi
CM	23	Kang Chae-rim		(substituted off) 66'
CM	10	Ji So-yun
CM	8	Cho So-hyun (c)	(yellow card) 4'
RF	17	Lee Geum-min
CF	13	Yeo Min-ji	(yellow card) 85'
LF	9	Moon Mi-ra		(substituted off) 82'
Substitutions:
MF	7	Lee Min-a		(substituted on) 66'
DF	3	Jeong Yeong-a		(substituted on) 79'
MF	12	Kang Yu-mi		(substituted on) 82'
Manager:
Yoon Deok-yeo

GK	1	Ingrid Hjelmseth
RB	2	Ingrid Moe Wold
CB	6	Maren Mjelde (c)
CB	3	Maria Thorisdottir
LB	17	Kristine Minde
RM	10	Caroline Graham Hansen	(substituted off) 54'
CM	8	Vilde Bøe Risa
CM	14	Ingrid Syrstad Engen
LM	16	Guro Reiten
CF	11	Lisa-Marie Utland	(substituted off) 46'
CF	9	Isabell Herlovsen	(substituted off) 69'
Substitutions:
MF	21	Karina Sævik	(substituted on) 46'
MF	18	Frida Maanum	(substituted on) 54'
FW	7	Elise Thorsnes	(substituted on) 69'
Manager:
(Sweden) Martin Sjögren

Player of the Match:
Caroline Graham Hansen (Norway)

Assistant referees:
Princess Brown (Jamaica)
Stephanie-Dale Yee Sing (Jamaica)
Fourth official:
Gladys Lengwe (Zambia)
Reserve assistant referee:
Maria Salamasina (Samoa)
Video assistant referee:
Chris Beath (Australia)
Assistant video assistant referees:
Mohammed Abdulla Hassan Mohamed (United Arab Emirates)
Lucie Ratajová (Czech Republic)

== Discipline ==
Fair play points would have been used as tiebreakers in the group if the overall and head-to-head records of teams were tied, or if teams had the same record in the ranking of third-placed teams. These were calculated based on yellow and red cards received in all group matches as follows:

- first yellow card: minus 1 point;
- indirect red card (second yellow card): minus 3 points;
- direct red card: minus 4 points;
- yellow card and direct red card: minus 5 points;

Only one of the above deductions were applied to a player in a single match.

Team	Match 1				Match 2				Match 3				Points
Team	Yellow card	(yellow card) (yellow-red card)	Red card	(yellow card) (red card)	Yellow card	(yellow card) (yellow-red card)	Red card	(yellow card) (red card)	Yellow card	(yellow card) (yellow-red card)	Red card	(yellow card) (red card)	Points
Norway					1								−1
France					1				1				−2
South Korea					2				2				−4
Nigeria	2				1				2	1			−8

== See also ==
- France at the FIFA Women's World Cup
- Nigeria at the FIFA Women's World Cup
- Norway at the FIFA Women's World Cup
- South Korea at the FIFA Women's World Cup
