= France at the UEFA Women's Championship =

France have participated 8 times at the UEFA Women's Championship: Their best achievement is reaching the UEFA Women's Championships semi finals in (2022). Since Euro 1997, France have reached at least the quarter-finals.

== UEFA Women's Championship ==
UEFA Women's Championship record									Qualifying record							
Year	Result	Position	GP	W	D*	L	GS	GA	GP	W	D*	L	GS	GA	P/R	Rnk
1984	Did not qualify								6	2	3	1	4	4		
(Norway) 1987	Did not qualify								6	1	0	5	7	15		
(West Germany) 1989	Did not qualify								10	4	4	2	15	3		
(Denmark) 1991	Did not qualify								4	2	0	2	6	7		
(Italy) 1993	Did not qualify								4	1	1	2	7	10		
(England) (Germany) (Norway) (Sweden) 1995	Did not qualify								6	4	1	1	9	3		
(Norway) (Sweden) 1997	Group stage	6th	3	1	1	1	4	5	8	4	3	1	14	6		
(Germany) 2001	Group stage	6th	3	1	0	2	5	7	6	4	2	0	10	5		
(England) 2005	Group stage	6th	3	1	1	1	4	5	8	7	0	1	32	7		
(Finland) 2009	Quarter-finals	8th	4	1	2	1	5	7	8	7	0	1	31	2		
(Sweden) 2013	Quarter-finals	5th	4	3	1	0	8	2	8	8	0	0	32	2		
(Netherlands) 2017	Quarter-finals	6th	4	1	2	1	3	3	8	8	0	0	27	0		
(England) 2022	Semi-finals	3rd	5	3	1	1	10	5	8	7	1	0	44	0		
(Switzerland) 2025	Quarter-finals	5th	4	3	1	0	12	5	6	4	0	2	8	7	(Note: From Euro 2025 onwards a new qualifying format was introduced, linked to the Women's Nations League where teams are divided into leagues with promotion/relegation between the leagues at the end of each cycle.)	3rd
(Germany) 2029																
Total	8/14	0 Titles	30	14	9	7	51	39	96	63	15	18	246	71	3rd	

*Draws include knockout matches decided by penalty shootout.

== Head-to-head record ==
Opponent	Pld	W	D	L	GF	GA	GD	Win %
Austria	1	0	1	0	1	1	+0	0.00
Belgium	1	1	0	0	2	1	+1	100.00
Denmark	2	0	1	1	4	5	−1	0.00
England	3	2	0	1	5	2	+3	66.67
Germany	4	0	1	3	3	11	−8	0.00
Iceland	3	2	1	0	5	2	+3	66.67
Italy	3	3	0	0	10	2	+8	100.00
Netherlands	3	2	1	0	6	2	+4	66.67
Norway	3	0	2	1	2	5	−3	0.00
Russia	2	2	0	0	6	2	+4	100.00
Spain	2	1	1	0	2	1	+1	50.00
Sweden	1	0	0	1	0	3	−3	0.00
Switzerland	1	0	1	0	1	1	+0	0.00
Wales	1	1	0	0	4	1	+3	100.00
Total	30	14	9	7	51	39	+12	46.67

== See also ==
- France at the FIFA Women's World Cup
