= Kim Do-yeon (footballer, born 1988) =

South Korean footballer (born 1988)

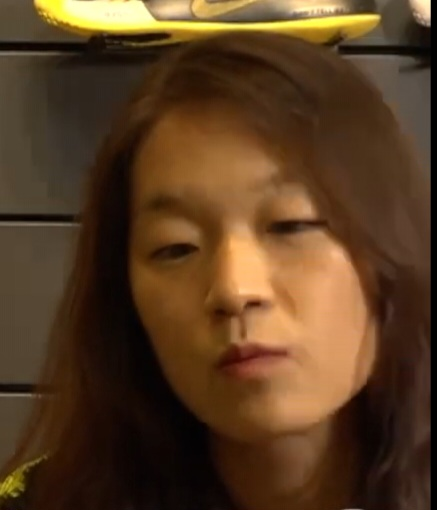

Personal information
- Date of birth: 7 December 1988 (age 37)
- Height: 1.66 m (5 ft 5 1/2 in)
- Position: Defender

Team information
- Current team: Sejong Sportstoto WFC
- Number: 4

Senior career*
Years	Team	Apps	(Gls)
2010–2011	Seoul WFC		
2012–2023	Hyundai Steel Red Angels		
2024-	Sejong Sportstoto WFC		

International career
2005	South Korea U17	5	(0)
2007	South Korea U20	5	(0)
2007–2019	South Korea	83	(1)
- * Club domestic league appearances and goals

Kim Do-yeon (Korean: 김도연; Korean pronunciation: [kim.do.jʌn] or [kim] [to.jʌn]; born 7 December 1988) is a South Korean footballer who plays for Sejong Sportstoto WFC. With South Korea, she participated at the 2015 FIFA Women's World Cup.
