= Yeo Min-ji =

South Korean footballer

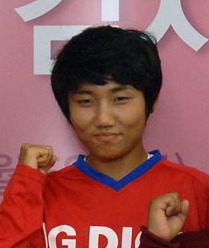
- Yeo in 2010

Personal information
- Date of birth: 27 April 1993 (age 33)
- Place of birth: Gimhae, South Korea
- Height: 1.60 m (5 ft 3 in)
- Position: Forward

Team information
- Current team: Selangor
- Number: 17

Senior career*
Years	Team	Apps	(Gls)
2014–2018	Gumi Sportstoto		
2019–2020	Suwon UDC		
2021–2024	Gyeongju KHNP	33	(15)
2025–2026	JEF United Chiba	5	(0)
2026–	Selangor	0	(0)

International career^{‡}
2007–2010	South Korea U17	14	(22)
2011–2012	South Korea U20	7	(0)
2011–	South Korea	53	(15)
Medal record
Women's football
Representing South Korea
FIFA U-17 Women's World Cup
Winner	2010 Trinidad and Tobago
AFC Women's Asian Cup
Runner-up	2022 India
AFC U-16 Women's Championship
Winner	2009 Thailand
EAFF Championship
Runner-up	2019 South Korea
- * Club domestic league appearances and goals ‡ National team caps and goals as of 26 October 2024

- Yeo Min-ji
- Hangul: 여민지
- Hanja: 余敏智
- RR: Yeo Minji
- MR: Yŏ Minji

Yeo Min-ji (Korean: 여민지; born 27 April 1993) is a South Korean footballer who plays as a forward for Selangor.

== Early life ==
Yeo became interested in football as a child, playing together with her older brother. She began training in earnest when she joined the football academy at Myeongseo Elementary School in Busan in the fourth grade. She was the top goalscorer when her team achieved a clean sweep of all the domestic tournament titles in 2005.

While playing for Haman Daesan High School and representing South Korea at youth level, Yeo sustained an injury to her right knee which required surgery. Yeo later attended Ulsan College, where she was part of the winning team at the university division of the Korean Women's National Championship.

== Club career ==
Following her performance at the 2010 FIFA U-17 Women's World Cup, Yeo was one of the most highly anticipated newcomers ahead of the start of the 2014 WK League. She was the third pick at the 2014 WK League draft, signing a three-year contract with Chungbuk Sportstoto. While playing for Sportstoto for five years, she won two Korean Women's National Championship titles with the club, and became the top goalscorer at one of the two tournaments.

After leaving Sportstoto at the end of the 2018 season, Yeo played for Suwon UDC from 2019 to 2020, and Gyeongju KHNP from 2021 to 2024. She was appointed Gyeongju's captain from 2022 to 2024.

In March 2025, South Korean media reported that Yeo's agency had reached a deal with Toppserien club Kolbotn, and left the last procedures including her medical examination. In June, Yeo signed for WE League side JEF United Chiba, contrary to expectations.

== International career ==
Yeo started to train at the national under-20 team when she was 14 years old, but missed out on the 2008 FIFA U-20 Women's World Cup due to an ACL injury.

While South Korea won their first AFC U-16 Women's Championship title in 2009, Yeo became the top goalscorer of the tournament with 10 goals in five matches. She scored hat-tricks against Myanmar and Thailand, the winning goal in a 1–0 win over Japan, and three goals in two matches against North Korea. Her influence was continued until the 2010 FIFA U-17 Women's World Cup, where South Korea won a world competition organised by FIFA for the first time. At the U-17 World Cup, she scored eight goals during six matches, receiving the Golden Ball and the Golden Shoe. She was subsequently named the AFC Women's Youth Player of the Year.

After her success as a youth international, Yeo became a regular in the senior squad. She was named in the squad for the 2015 FIFA Women's World Cup, but was unable to play in the finals following a knee injury in training.

During the 2019 FIFA Women's World Cup, Yeo played all three Group A matches and scored South Korea's only goal at the tournament in a 2–1 defeat to Norway.

== Honours ==
Gumi Sportstoto

- Korean Women's National Championship: 2017, 2018

Suwon UDC

- Korean Women's National Championship: 2019

Gyeongju KHNP

- Korean Women's National Championship: 2022

South Korea U17

- FIFA U-17 Women's World Cup: 2010
- AFC U-17 Women's Asian Cup: 2009

South Korea

- AFC Women's Asian Cup runner-up: 2022
- EAFF Championship runner-up: 2019

Individual

- AFC U-17 Women's Asian Cup top goalscorer: 2009
- FIFA U-17 Women's World Cup Golden Ball: 2010
- FIFA U-17 Women's World Cup Golden Shoe: 2010
- AFC Women's Youth Player of the Year: 2010
- Korean Women's National Championship top goalscorer: 2018
