= Valérie Gauvin =

French footballer (born 1996)

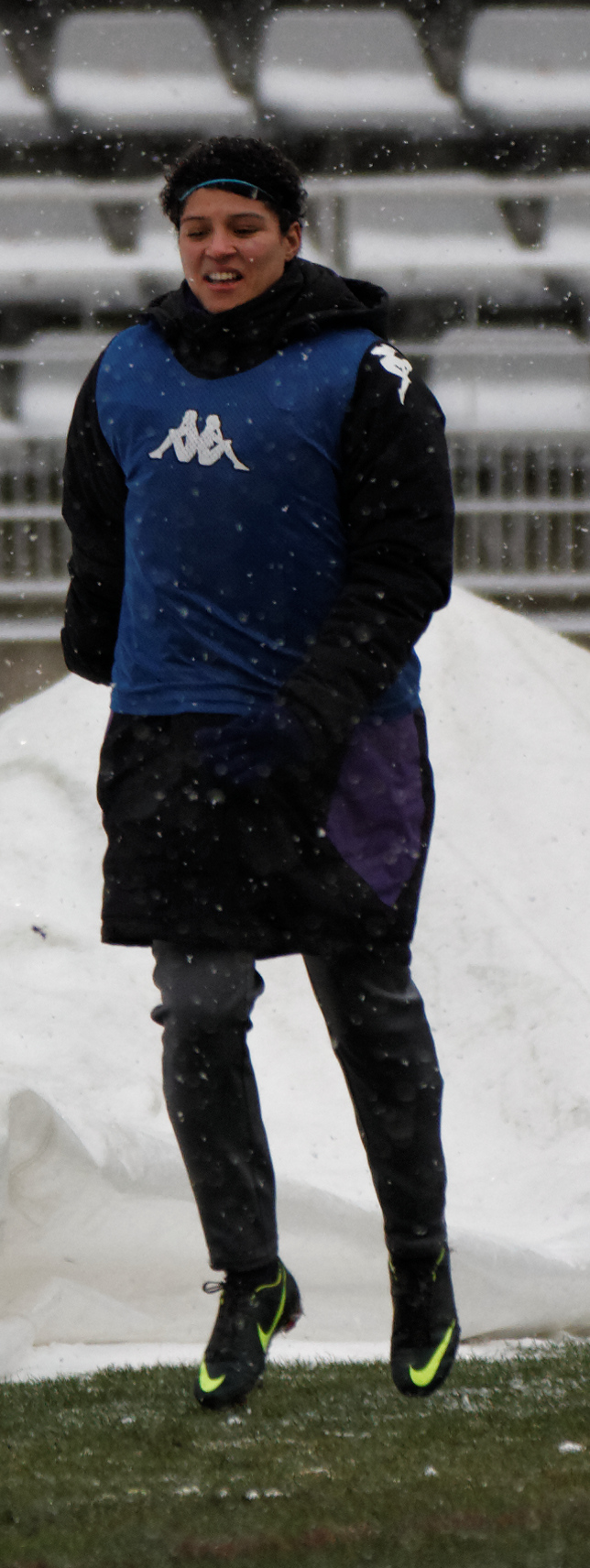
- Gauvin in 2013

Personal information
- Full name: Valérie Marie Christelle Gauvin
- Date of birth: 1 June 1996 (age 30)
- Place of birth: Sainte-Clotilde, Réunion, France
- Height: 1.73 m (5 ft 8 in)
- Position: Forward

Team information
- Current team: US Colomiers

Youth career
- 2003–2008: FC Mirandais
- 2008–2014: Toulouse

Senior career*
Years	Team	Apps	(Gls)
2012–2014	Toulouse	31	(33)
2014–2020	Montpellier	90	(50)
2020–2022	Everton	27	(5)
2022	North Carolina Courage	0	(0)
2022	Houston Dash	3	(0)
2023	Fleury	3	(0)
2023–2026	Montauban	6	(0)
2026–	US Colomiers	0	(0)

International career
2012	France U16	5	(3)
2012–2013	France U17	9	(9)
2016	France U20	6	(1)
2016–2017	France U23	8	(6)
2015–2021	France	37	(17)
Medal record
Summer Universiade
Gold medal – first place	2015 Gwangju	Team
- * Club domestic league appearances and goals as of 1 July 2024

Valérie Marie Christelle Gauvin (born 1 June 1996) is a professional footballer who plays as a forward for US Colomiers. Born in Réunion, she played for the France national team.

== Club career ==
=== Toulouse ===
Gauvin was born on the French island of Réunion and moved to the south-west of mainland France with her mother and sister at the age of 4. At the age of 12 she joined Toulouse to train with the club, and at the age of 16 joined the senior team in the Division 2 Féminine. In 2012–13, Gauvin played for Toulouse in the Division 1 Féminine before being relegated back to the Division 2 Féminine. In the 2013–14 season she was the top scorer of the league with 32 goals in 20 games. During her time at Toulouse, she also scored 45 goals in the National U19 Challenge.

=== Montpellier ===
In June 2014, Gauvin returned to the Division 1 Féminine, joining Montpellier. In May 2017, following a successful season in which she scored 13 goals in 17 appearances and helped Montpellier qualify for the 2017–18 UEFA Women's Champions League, Gauvin signed a contract extension until 2020.

=== Everton ===
After scoring 14 goals in 16 appearances for Montpellier in the 2019–20 season, Gauvin was signed by FA Women's Super League club Everton in August 2020.

=== North Carolina Courage ===
On 31 March 2022, the North Carolina Courage of the American National Women's Soccer League paid a transfer fee to Everton to acquire Gauvin, who signed a one-year contract with one-year option. After five months without an appearance for the club while recuperating from minor injuries, the Courage traded Gauvin to Houston Dash in exchange for $25,000 in allocation money and a conditional second-round pick in the 2024 NWSL Draft.

== International career ==
In July 2012, Gauvin represented France under-16 at the 2012 Nordic Under-16 Cup. She started in the 1–0 loss to Sweden, started and scored the first goal in the 5–1 victory over Finland, and started and scored a brace in the 3–0 victory over Norway, giving France the third place in the tournament.

In October 2012, Gauvin represented France under-17 in the first round of the 2013 UEFA Women's Under-17 Championship qualification campaign. She started all 3 matches, scoring a brace in the 5–0 victory against Bosnia and Herzegovina, a brace in the 12–0 victory over Lithuania, and a hat-trick in the 5–0 victory over Hungary. In March 2013, she was in the French squad for the second round. She started and scored a goal in both the 3–1 victory over Northern Ireland and in the 2–0 victory over Finland, but came on as a 75th minute substitute in the 1–1 draw with Spain, who qualified due to a better goal-difference.

In July 2015, Gauvin helped France to win the gold medal at the 2015 Summer Universiade, including opening the scoring against Russia in the 2–0 victory in the final.

In September 2015, Gauvin was called up to the French senior team for the first time, for matches against Brazil and Romania. She made her official debut appearance for the French senior team on 23 October 2015, in a 2–1 loss to the Netherlands, coming on as a substitute for Marie-Laure Delie in the 71st minute.

In November 2016, Gauvin was selected for France's under-20 squad for the 2016 FIFA U-20 Women's World Cup. She played in a friendly against Canada in Australia ahead of the tournament, scoring the second goal in a 2–0 victory. In the tournament's group stage she came on as a late sub in the 0–0 draw against the United States and in the 2–0 victory over New Zealand. She started in the 2–2 draw against Ghana, providing the assist for the first goal by Delphine Cascarino. In the knock-out stage she came on as a sub in extra-time in the semi-final 2–1 victory over Japan and in the 73rd minute in the final against North Korea which France lost 3–1.

In March 2017, Gauvin represented the French secondary senior team at the 2017 Istria Cup. She played in all 4 matches, scoring a hat-trick against Hungary B. France B finished the tournament in third place, beating Northern Ireland 1–0.

On 23 October 2017, Gauvin scored her first goal for the French senior team in an 8–0 victory over Ghana during a friendly match. On 6 April 2018, Gauvin scored a hat-trick in an 8–0 victory over Nigeria.

== Personal life ==
Gauvin's father, Alex Augustine, is a former footballer who represented the Réunion men's national team.

== Career statistics ==
=== International ===
As of 26 November 2021

Appearances and goals by national team and year
National team	Year	Apps	Goals
France	2015	1	0
France	2016	0	0
France	2017	4	1
France	2018	8	4
France	2019	15	8
France	2020	5	3
France	2021	4	1
Total		37	17

Scores and results list France's goal tally first, score column indicates score after each Gauvin goal.

International goals by date, venue, opponent, score, result and competition
#	Date	Venue	Opponent	Score	Result	Competition
1.	23 October 2017	Stade Auguste Delaune, Reims, France	Ghana	8–0	8–0	Friendly
2.	7 March 2018	Orlando City Stadium, Orlando, United States	Germany	3–0	3–0	SheBelieves Cup
3.	6 April 2018	MMArena, Le Mans, France	Nigeria	2–0	8–0	Friendly
4.	6 April 2018	MMArena, Le Mans, France	Nigeria	5–0	8–0	Friendly
5.	6 April 2018	MMArena, Le Mans, France	Nigeria	6–0	8–0	Friendly
6.	4 March 2019	Stade de la Vallée du Cher, Tours, France	Uruguay	3–0	6–0	Friendly
7.	4 March 2019	Stade de la Vallée du Cher, Tours, France	Uruguay	5–0	6–0	Friendly
8.	4 April 2019	Stade de l'Abbé-Deschamps, Auxerre, France	Japan	1–1	3–1	Friendly
9.	8 April 2019	Stade de la Meinau, Strasbourg, France	Denmark	4–0	4–0	Friendly
10.	31 May 2019	Stade Dominique Duvauchelle, Créteil, France	China	1–0	2–0	Friendly
11.	12 June 2019	Allianz Riviera, Nice, France	Norway	1–0	2–1	2019 FIFA Women's World Cup
12.	23 June 2019	Stade Océane, Le Havre, France	Brazil	1–0	2–1	2019 FIFA Women's World Cup
13.	8 October 2019	Kazhymukan Munaitapaspv Stadium, Shymkent, Kazakhstan	Kazakhstan	1–0	3–0	UEFA Women's Euro 2022 qualifying
14.	7 March 2020	Stade du Hainaut, Valenciennes, France	Brazil	1–0	1–0	2020 Tournoi de France
15.	10 March 2020	Stade du Hainaut, Valenciennes, France	Netherlands	1–2	3–3	2020 Tournoi de France
16.	23 October 2020	Stade de la Source, Orléans, France	North Macedonia	1–0	11–0	UEFA Women's Euro 2022 qualifying
17.	26 November 2021	Stade de la Rabine, Vannes, France	Kazakhstan	5–0	6–0	2023 FIFA Women's World Cup qualification
