= Linda Ørmen =

Norwegian footballer (born 1977)

Personal information
- Date of birth: 22 March 1977 (age 49)
- Height: 1.67 m (5 ft 6 in)
- Position: Forward

Senior career*
Years	Team	Apps	(Gls)
1983–1991	Råde		
1991–1996	Sprint-Jeløy		
1996–1999	Athene Moss		
1999–2001	Kolbotn		
2001–2002	New York Power		
2002–2003	Asker		

International career
1992–1993	Norway U16	12	(3)
1995–1997	Norway U20	16	(2)
1998–2000	Norway U21	7	(3)
1998–2003	Norway	51	(14)
- * Club domestic league appearances and goals

Linda Ørmen (born 22 March 1977) is a former Norwegian football player who played for the Norway national team from 1998 to 2001.

She played on the Norwegian team that finished fourth at the 1999 FIFA World Cup in the United States.

Ørmen played for the clubs Athene Moss, Kolbotn IL, New York Power, and Asker.
