= Kim Jin-hee (footballer) =

South Korean footballer (born 1981)

Personal information
- Date of birth: 26 March 1981 (age 45)
- Height: 1.65 m (5 ft 5 in)
- Position: Midfielder

Senior career*
Years	Team	Apps	(Gls)
- Ulsan College
- Incheon Red Angels

International career^{‡}
1999-2007	South Korea	41	(7)
- * Club domestic league appearances and goals ‡ National team caps and goals as of 06:58, 19 March 2026 (UTC)

- Kim Jin-hee
- Hangul: 김진희
- RR: Gim Jinhui
- MR: Kim Chinhŭi

Kim Jin-hee (born 26 March 1981) is a South Korean former footballer who played as a midfielder. She was a member of the South Korea women's national football team, and of the team at the 2003 FIFA Women's World Cup. She was the first player ever to score for South Korea at a FIFA Women's World Cup.

== International goals ==
No.	Date	Venue	Opponent	Score	Result	Competition
1.	10 June 2003	Rajamangala Stadium, Bangkok, Thailand	Thailand	2–0	6–0	2003 AFC Women's Championship
2.	19 June 2003	Rajamangala Stadium, Bangkok, Thailand	China	1–2	1–3	2003 AFC Women's Championship
3.	27 September 2003	Gillette Stadium, Foxborough, United States	Norway	1–5	1–7	2003 FIFA Women's World Cup
4.	20 July 2006	Hindmarsh Stadium, Adelaide, Australia	Thailand	6–0	11–0	2006 AFC Women's Asian Cup
5.	4 December 2006	Ahmed bin Ali Stadium, Al-Rayyan, Qatar	Vietnam	1–0	3–1	2006 Asian Games
