= Anita Rapp =

Norwegian footballer (born 1977)

Personal information
- Full name: Anita Rapp-Ødegaard
- Birth name: Anita Rapp
- Date of birth: 24 July 1977 (age 49)
- Place of birth: Lillehammer, Norway
- Height: 1.77 m (5 ft 10 in)

College career
Years	Team	Apps	(Gls)
1997–2001	Oakland Golden Grizzlies	64	(37)

Senior career*
Years	Team	Apps	(Gls)
1998–2001	Asker	36	(26)
2002–2003	New York Power		
2004	Asker	17	(7)

International career
1999–2003	Norway	62	(12)
Medal record
Women's football
Representing Norway
Olympic Games
Gold medal – first place	2000 Sydney	Team competition
- * Club domestic league appearances and goals

Anita Rapp-Ødegaard (born 24 July 1977) is a former Norwegian footballer and Olympic champion.

She debuted for the Norway women's national football team in 1998, and played 62 matches for the national team. She was on the gold medal-winning team at the 2000 Summer Olympics in Sydney.

She played for Oakland University from 1997 to 2001.
