= Marie-Soleil Beaudoin =

Canadian soccer referee

- Full name: Marie-Soleil Beaudoin
- Born: 30 November 1982 (age 43); North Vancouver, British Columbia
- Other occupation: Professor

Domestic
Years	League	Role
2015–2017	USL Championship	Referee
2019	National Women's Soccer League	Referee
2019–Present	Canadian Premier League	Referee

International
Years	League	Role
2014–Present	FIFA listed	Referee

Marie-Soleil Beaudoin (born 30 November 1982) is a Canadian soccer referee. She was named to the FIFA International list in 2014. She is also a professor of physiology and biophysics at Dalhousie University.

== Early life and education ==
Beaudoin was born in 1982 in North Vancouver, before moving to Quebec City, Quebec as a toddler. She is the oldest of three daughters and began playing soccer at the age of five.

Beaudoin graduated from McGill University with a bachelor in science, minoring in education. She then attended the University of Guelph graduating with a masters in science and a PhD in nutrition, exercise and metabolism.

She worked as a professor at the University of Northern British Columbia for a year, before being hired as a professor of physiology and biophysics at Dalhousie University.

== Refereeing career ==
Beaudoin received her regional badge in 2008, provincial status in 2009, national badge in 2013 and her FIFA badge in 2014.

On 31 August 2018 Beaudoin was appointed to referee the 2018 FIFA U-17 Women's World Cup in Uruguay. Beaudoin refereed the final of that tournament with Jamaican assistant referees Princess Brown and Stephanie-Dale Yee Sing.

On 3 December 2018 FIFA announced that Beaudoin had been appointed to be an official in the 2019 FIFA Women's World Cup. After the conclusion of the round of 16, Beaudoin was retained as one of 11 officials to be assigned matches for the remainder of the tournament. Beaudoin also officiated a National Women's Soccer League match between Orlando Pride and Portland Thorns FC on 11 May 2019.

During the inaugural season of the Canadian Premier League, Beaudoin was assigned to officiate HFX Wanderers FC's home opener against Forge FC on 4 May 2019.

On 9 January 2023, FIFA appointed her to the officiating pool for the 2023 FIFA Women's World Cup in Australia and New Zealand.

On 16 April 2025, she was the referee for the inaugural match of the Northern Super League between Vancouver Rise FC and Calgary Wild FC.

== Honours ==
- Ray Morgan Memorial Award: 2014
