= Louisa Cadamuro =

French footballer (born 1987)

Louisa Nécib
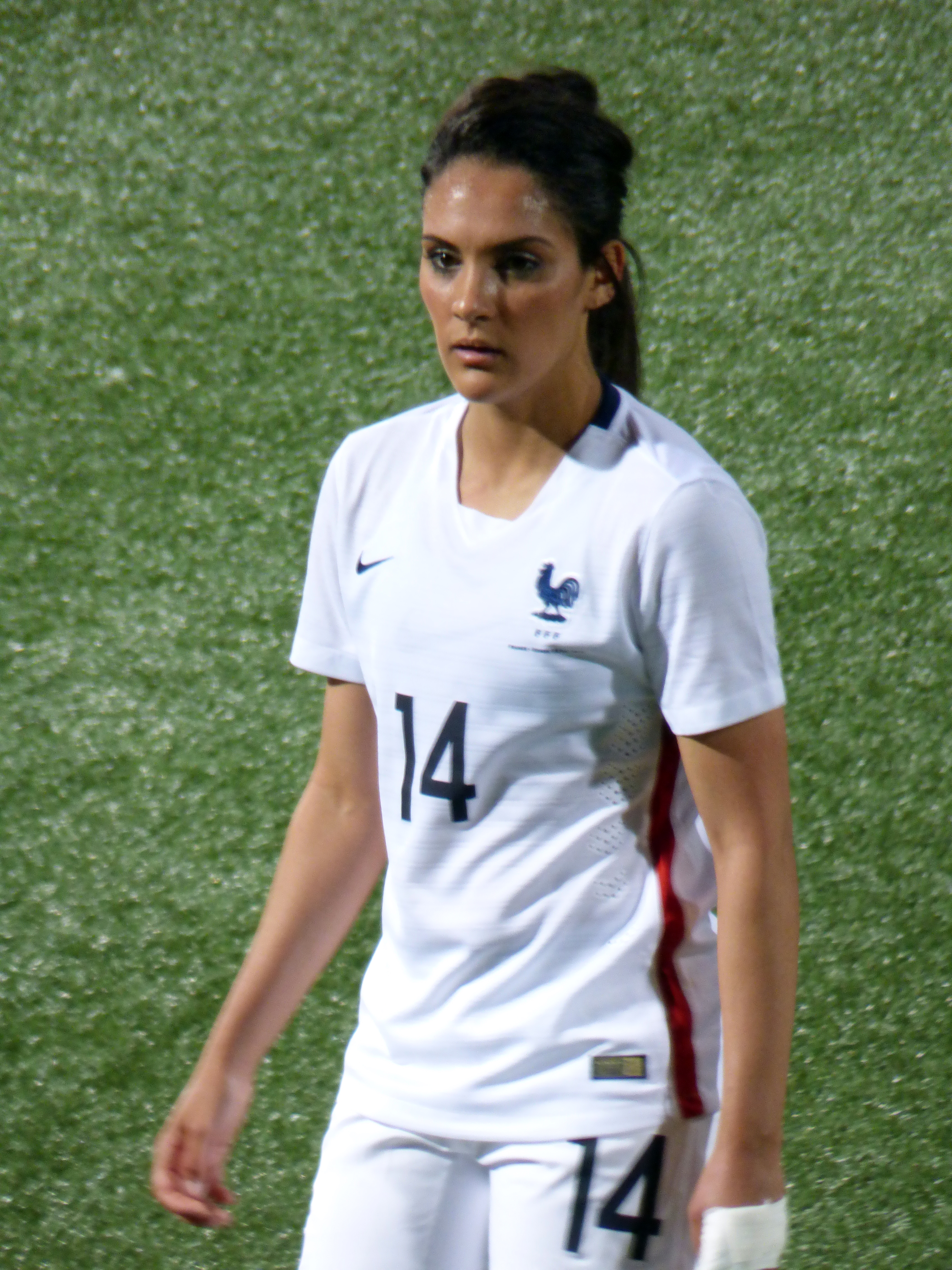
- Nécib with France in 2015

Personal information
- Full name: Louisa Nécib Cadamuro
- Date of birth: 23 January 1987 (age 39)
- Place of birth: Marseille, France
- Height: 1.68 m (5 ft 6 in)
- Position: Midfielder

Youth career
- 2000–2002: US Marseille
- 2002–2004: Celtic de Marseille

Senior career*
Years	Team	Apps	(Gls)
2004–2006	CNFE Clairefontaine	38	(9)
2006–2007	Montpellier	20	(11)
2007–2016	Lyon	173	(64)
Total		231	(84)

International career
2003	France U17		
2004–2005	France U19		
2006	France U20	6	(2)
2005–2016	France	145	(36)
- * Club domestic league appearances and goals

Louisa Nécib Cadamuro (French pronunciation: [luiza nesib]; born 23 January 1987) is a French former professional footballer who played for the France national team. She spent the majority of her career at Lyon, amassing eighteen titles with the French club over a nine-year span. She played as an attacking midfielder and was described as a "gifted playmaker" who "possesses superb technique". Nécib is also known for her "elegant possession, sublime passing skills, and cultured touch on the ball".

She has been labeled by the French media as "the female Zidane" – like Zinedine Zidane, she has Algerian ancestry, grew up in Marseille and possesses immense skill, especially as a playmaker with an eye for goal. As such, she has been nicknamed "Ziza", a variant of Zidane's "Zizou". In an interview with FIFA.com just before the 2012 Olympics, she alluded to the comparison, saying, "Zidane is a role model for me. He was always the player that I most enjoyed watching. The comparison was made frequently when I was starting out, and now, as the years pass, it happens less and less often. But I wouldn't say I’m tired of it." She often attempts to downplay the comparison, though, stating "Being compared to Zidane is really nice, but I don't think it can harm me because I’ve been hearing it since I was very young. It always makes me proud, but as I always say, I don't think you can compare anyone to him. He's unique". While training at the Clairefontaine academy in 2004, Nécib met Zidane, who was at the training center in preparation for qualifying for the 2006 World Cup (the finals would eventually be his last act as a professional). The two players exchanged shirts, and the shirt Nécib acquired from Zidane is currently in the possession of her father.

Nécib began her football career playing for local youth clubs in her hometown of Marseille, such as Union Sportive Marseille and Celtic de Marseille. With the latter club, she made her senior team debut in 2003 and, in the following season, helped the club win the Division 3 Féminine. In 2004, Nécib was selected to attend CNFE Clairefontaine, the women's section of the Clairefontaine academy. She spent two years at the training center, and in 2006, departed for Montpellier of the Division 1 Féminine. In her only season with Montpellier, Nécib helped the team win the 2006–07 edition of the Challenge de France. After departing Montpellier, she joined Lyon. Since joining the club, Nécib has won a slew of trophies, which include four league titles, one Challenge de France, and one UEFA Women's Champions League title. For her performances during the 2008–09 season, she was named the National Union of Professional Footballers (UNFP) Female Player of the Year.

Nécib is a former French women's youth international having represented her nation at all levels for which she was eligible. At under-19 level, she played on the teams that reached the 2004 and 2005 editions of the UEFA Women's Under-19 Championship. With the under-20 team, Nécib played at the 2006 FIFA U-20 Women's World Championship scoring a goal in the group stage against Argentina as France reached the quarter-finals. Prior to playing in the U-20 Women's World Cup, Nécib made her senior international debut in February 2005 in a friendly match against Norway. Two years later in March 2007, Nécib scored her first senior international goal in a UEFA Women's Euro 2009 qualifying victory over Greece. She has participated in five major international tournaments for her country; the 2005 and 2009 editions of UEFA Women's Euro and the 2011 and 2015 FIFA Women's World Cup and the 2012 Summer Olympics. In the latter competition, Nécib acted as the playmaker and contributed to the team that finished in fourth place.

== Club career ==
=== Early career ===
"These comparisons do not bother me. To be compared with Zizou is a pride. But there is no comparison to make. I am myself."

— Nécib on the comparisons to Zinedine Zidane.

Nécib began her career as a youth player for her hometown club Union Sportive de Marseille. After spending two years at the club, she signed on with nearby Celtic de Marseille. Nécib spent six months developing in the academy and, in April 2002, she was selected to attend the under-16 female National Cup representing her region. The competition served as a training camp for the Centre National de Formation et d'Entraînement (CNFE) (English: National Center for Education and Training) located at the Clairefontaine academy in Clairefontaine-en-Yvelines. The initiative to allow women to train at the famous national center came about in the 1990s due to the fact that it had quickly become a high-level training facility for male football players. As a result of allowing female football players to train at the academy, younger women were afforded the same benefits from the facilities offered by Clairefontaine as the men. At the National Cup, Nécib impressed and was given an award by coaches for possessing the best shot of any player. After the competition, she returned to Celtic.

At the age of 16, Nécib was promoted to the senior team by coach Yohan Silvy in the latter part of the 2002–03 season. While at the club, Nécib was teammates with future national teammate Caroline Pizzala. In the 2003–04 season, Nécib flourished and helped the club reach the Division 3 Féminine league final where they faced the women's team of professional men's club Le Mans. In the tie, Nécib started and played the full match as Celtic cruised to a 4–1 victory. The result promoted the club to the Division 2 Féminine, the second division of French women's football. Nécib's performance that season attracted numerous attention, which resulted in her being nicknamed Titou as homage to Zinedine Zidane, who is nicknamed Zizou.

After three years with Celtic, in July 2004, Nécib was selected to attend the CNFE academy at Clairefontaine. She initially struggled to adapt at the center admitting "the first year was really hard because I was so far from my family. I almost gave up". However, after developing a rapport with future international teammates Sarah Bouhaddi, Élodie Thomis, Laure Boulleau, Jessica Houara, and the aforementioned Pizzala, Nécib quickly returned to the form that got her selected to the center. The CNFE academy is allowed participation in the French women's football league system and, from 2002 to 2007, fielded a team that participated in the Division 1 Féminine. Nécib spent two seasons with the team and made her league debut on 29 August 2004 against Lyon. In the match, she scored the only goal, a 90th-minute winner, in a 1–0 win. Nécib finished the campaign with 20 league appearances and six goals. Four of her six goals came in the final four weeks of the season. On 26 March 2005, she scored a double in a 4–2 defeat to Juvisy. A week later, she scored the only goal in a win over Olympique Saint-Memmie and, on the final match day of the season, she scored the team's fourth goal in a 5–1 win over Lyon. CNFE ultimately finished the campaign in 5th-place position. In the following season, Nécib appeared in 18 matches and scored three goals, all of which came in victories.

=== Montpellier ===
After completing her education and training at Clairefontaine, Nécib returned to the south of France to sign with Division 1 Féminine club Montpellier. She joined the club alongside former Clairefontaine teammate Thomis and made her debut on 3 September 2006 in a 0–0 league draw with Toulouse. She scored her first goal for the club two weeks later on 17 September converting a double in a 5–0 away win over USCO Compiègne. On 8 October, Nécib scored the second goal in a 2–0 victory against Soyaux. In November, she scored two goals each in wins over FCF Condé-sur-Noireau and Hénin-Beaumont. Nécib finished the campaign with 11 league goals, which was third-best on the team behind Thomis and Elodie Ramos. In the Challenge de France, the women's domestic cup competition in France, Nécib helped Montpellier reach the final where the team faced Lyon. She played the entire match as Montpellier won 3–0 on penalties. The domestic cup title was Nécib's first major honour of her career.

=== Lyon ===
Following the season, on 22 June 2007, Lyon officials announced that the club had signed both Nécib and Thomis to contracts. Nécib was handed the number 14 shirt and made her club debut on 2 September 2007 in the team's opening league match of the campaign; a 4–0 win over La Roche-sur-Yon. A week later, she scored her first goal for Lyon converting a penalty kick in a 2–0 win against Paris Saint-Germain. Nécib also made her debut in European competition participating in the 2007–08 edition of the UEFA Women's Cup. On her debut against the women's team of Slovak outfit Slovan Duslo Šaľa in the group stage, Nécib netted a hat trick in a 12–0 win. She ultimately finished the European campaign appearing in ten matches and scoring six goals as Lyon reached the semi-finals where the club was eliminated by Swedish club Umeå. While simultaneously performing well in Europe, Nécib remained productive in the league scoring in league wins over Toulouse, Hénin-Beaumont, and Soyaux late in the season. Lyon eventually pulled away from both Juvisy and Montpellier in the league standings to claim its second straight league title and Nécib's first overall. Nécib later helped Lyon capture its third Challenge de France, which completed the club's league and cup double that season. She scored the second goal in a 3–0 win over Paris Saint-Germain in the final match.

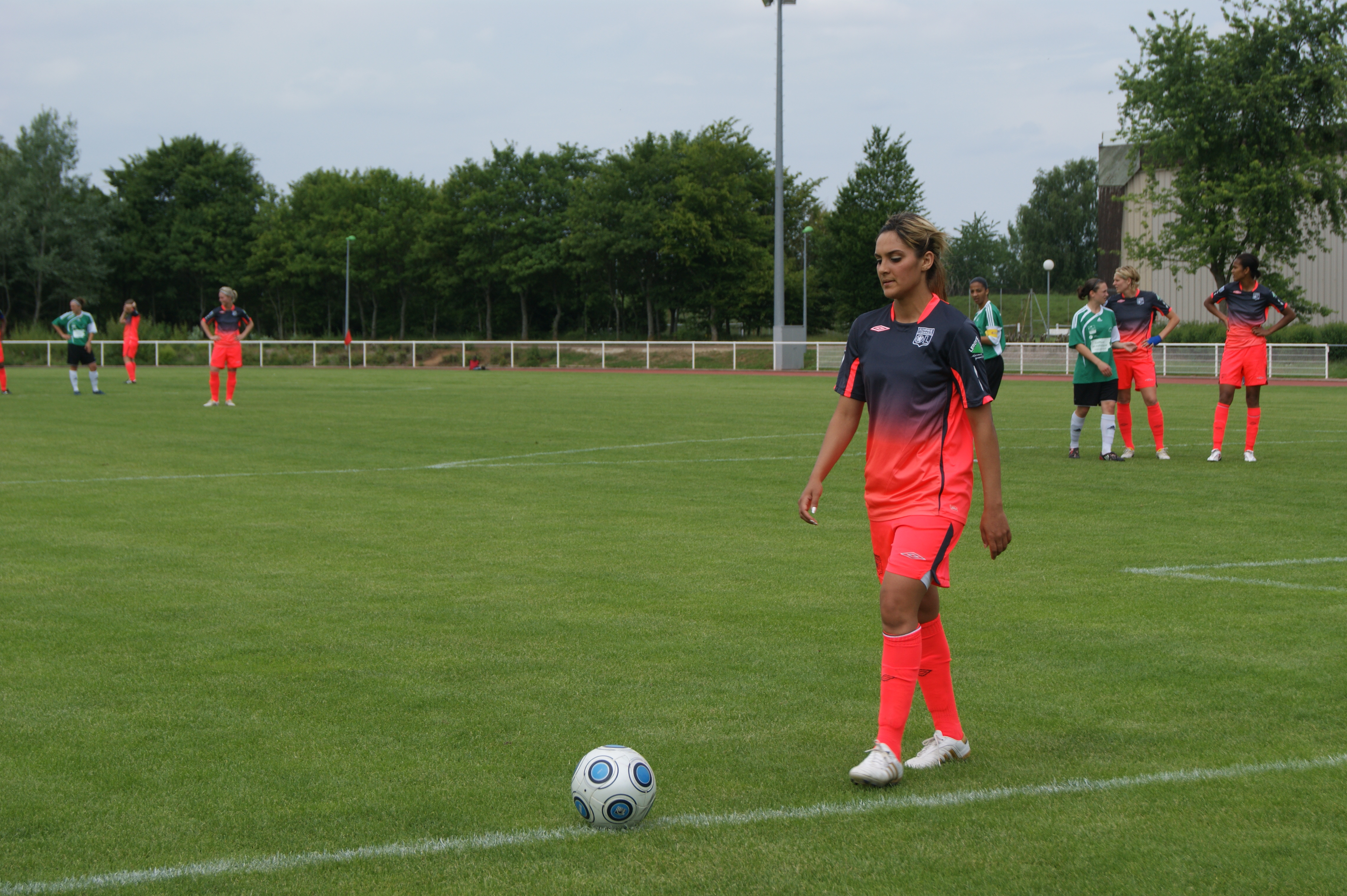
Nécib participating in a league match against Montigny-le-Bretonneux in the 2009–10 season.

During the infancy of the 2008–09 season, Nécib was selected to join the new United States-based women's soccer league, Women's Professional Soccer, after her American playing rights were assigned to the Washington Freedom in the 2008 WPS International Draft. Her Lyon teammate Sonia Bompastor was also assigned to the Freedom. While Bompastor was allowed to negotiate her exit out of the club, Lyon chairman Jean-Michel Aulas was able to convince Nécib to remain in France after having previously declared the player off limits. Nécib scored her first league goal of the campaign on 14 September 2008 in a 12–0 home win over Vendenheim. A month later, she scored a double in an 8–1 victory over Soyaux. Nécib repeated her two-goal display on 1 February 2009 in a 5–0 away win over Stade Briochin. In the UEFA Women's Cup, Nécib scored her first two goals of the campaign in an 8–0 home win over Austrian club Neulengbach in a second qualifying round group stage match. On 18 November, she scored the third goal in a 4–1 second leg win over Italian club Bardolino. The 9–1 aggregate scoreline advanced Lyon to the semi-finals for the second consecutive season where Lyon were again eliminated, this time by German team FCR 2001 Duisburg. In the league, Lyon captured its third straight league title, but was unable to defend its Challenge de France title losing to the eventual champions Montpellier in the semi-finals. For her performances during the campaign, Nécib was named the National Union of Professional Footballers (UNFP) Female Player of the Year.

In the 2009–10 season, Nécib switched to the number 10 shirt and, due to participating in UEFA Women's Euro 2009, was limited to two substitute appearances in the team's first three matches of the season. In her first start of the campaign against Soyaux, she scored a double in a 5–0 win. In the team's first match following the September international break, Nécib scored a goal in the team's 7–1 away win over Toulouse. In November, while on international duty with France, Nécib suffered an injury and, subsequently, missed five weeks domestically. She returned to the team in the new year in a league match against Saint-Étienne. In the match, she scored a goal in a 4–0 win. Nécib finished the campaign scoring two goals in the team's final four league matches as Lyon claimed its fourth consecutive league championship and reached the semi-finals of the Challenge de France. In the re-branded UEFA Women's Champions League, Nécib made eight appearances scoring four goals as Lyon reached the final. In the semi-finals against Umeå, she converted two goals in a 3–2 first leg victory. The 0–0 draw in the second leg allowed Lyon to advance to the final. In the penultimate match, Lyon faced German club Turbine Potsdam. Nécib played the entire match in regulation time, but was substituted out prior to the start of extra time. Lyon eventually conceded defeat losing 7–6 on penalties.

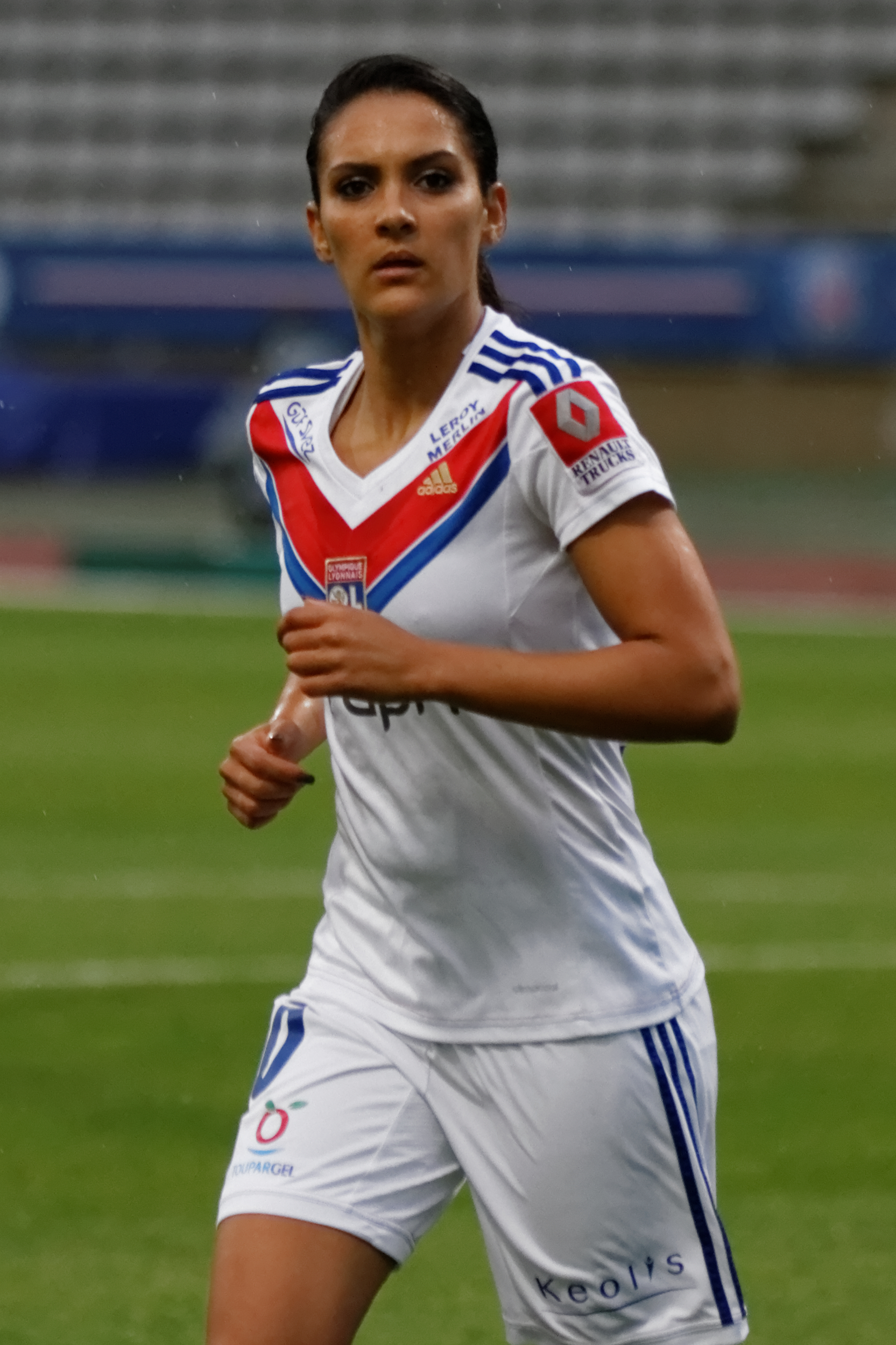
Nécib with Lyon in 2013

For the second time in her career at Lyon, in the 2010–11 season, Nécib converted double-digit goals scoring 14, which was third-best on the team behind Sandrine Brétigny and Eugénie Le Sommer. She opened the campaign by scoring in the team's first league match; a 6–0 win over Toulouse. Two weeks later, Nécib scored the second goal in a 3–0 victory against Stade Briochin. After scoring against La Roche-sur-Yon on 7 November 2010, she went scoreless for two months. On 9 January 2011, she scored two goals in a 7–0 home win over Hénin-Beaumont. Two weeks later, Nécib scored another set of goals, this time against Juvisy in a 7–1 win. In the Challenge de France, she scored in back-to-back rounds against Montigny-le-Bretonneux and Rodez before playing 53 minutes in a quarter-final defeat on penalties to Juvisy. On the final match day of the season, despite Lyon clinching its fifth straight league title with several matches to spare, Nécib started the match and scored her first league hat trick in an 8–0 victory. In the 2010–11 edition of the Women's Champions League, she scored her only goal of the competition on 4 November 2010 in the first leg of Lyon's Round of 16 tie against Russian club Rossiyanka. Nécib netted the final goal in a 6–1 away win. Despite her limited scoring, Lyon still reached the final where the team faced its nemesis Turbine Potsdam. In the final, Nécib started the match and played 55 minutes before being substituted out. Lyon went on to win the match 2–0 to claim its first-ever European title.

After the 2011–12 season, Nécib's contract with Lyon expired, which led to speculation that the player would join league rivals Paris Saint-Germain. However, on 16 July 2012, Nécib re-signed with Lyon after agreeing to a four-year contract with an option for a fifth year. On 21 May 2016, Lyon confirmed that Louisa Necib and her friend Lotta Schelin departed the club.

In July 2016, she confirmed that she would end her football career after the 2016 Summer Olympics.

== International career ==
=== Youth ===
Nécib is a former France women's youth international, having played for her nation at every level for which she was eligible. On 11 September 2003, she was called up to international level for the first time by coach Gérard Sergent to play with the under-17 team. She played with the team at the 2003 edition of the Nordic Cup, a premier women's youth tournament, before earning a call up to the under-19 team by coach Bruno Bini. At under-19 level, Nécib featured heavily playing with the team at the La Manga Cup and also representing France at the 2004 and 2005 editions of the UEFA Women's Under-19 Championship. In the 2004 competition, she appeared in two group stage matches as France suffered elimination in the group stage. In the 2005 edition, Nécib started all five matches France played as the team reached the final. She scored her only goal in the competition in a 4–0 opening group stage victory against Russia. In the final, France faced their group stage opponents Russia and were defeated 6–5 on penalties after the match finished 2–2 in regulation time.

Due to France's second-place finish at the 2005 UEFA Women's Under-19 Championship, the team qualified for the 2006 FIFA U-20 Women's World Championship, which merited under-20 appearances for Nécib. She made her under-20 debut on 12 August 2006 in a World Cup preparation friendly against Mexico. In the match, Nécib scored the team's second goal in a 4–2 victory. At the World Cup, Nécib appeared in all four matches France contested. In the team's opening group stage match against Argentina, she scored the team's third goal in a 5–0 win. France suffered elimination in the quarter-finals losing 2–1 to North Korea.

=== Senior ===
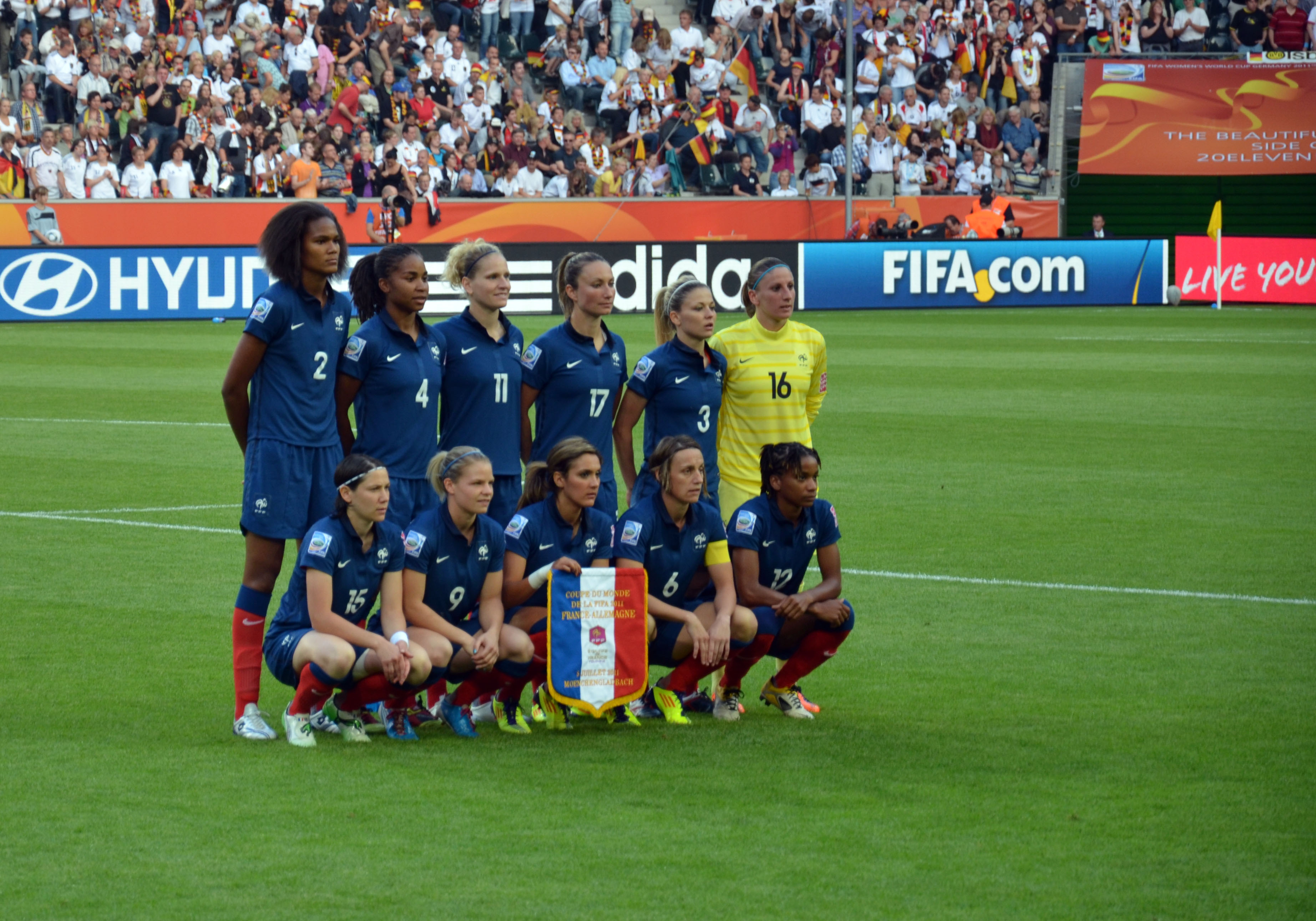
Nécib, bottom center, ahead of France's match against Germany at the 2011 FIFA Women's World Cup

Prior to playing at the 2005 UEFA Women's Under-19 Championship, Nécib made her senior international debut on 19 February 2005 in a friendly match against Norway. She started the match and was substituted out after 56 minutes as France won 2–0. The victory was France's first-ever against Norway. Despite featuring in only two senior international matches, the other match being the return leg friendly against Norway on 22 February, Nécib, at the age of 18, was included in the team to play at UEFA Women's Euro 2005 by coach Elisabeth Loisel. The midfielder featured in only one match in the competition; the final group stage match against Germany. Nécib played the entire match as the Germans won 3–0. In 2010, Nécib admitted that she took the Germany defeat hard stating "I still have regrets because all we needed was a draw and we conceded three goals in ten minutes". France had kept the Germans at bay for the majority of the match before letting in three goals in the final 20 minutes.

Following the conclusion of the 2006 U-20 World Cup, Nécib began playing full-time with the senior team participating in qualification matches for the 2007 FIFA Women's World Cup. During the season, Nécib also played with the team at the 2006 edition of the Algarve Cup. On 22 April 2006, she played with the team in a 5–0 World Cup qualification win against Hungary. Afterwards, Nécib failed to appear with the team in its final three qualification matches as France missed the World Cup after drawing 1–1 with England in its final qualifying match. France needed an outright victory to qualify for the tournament.

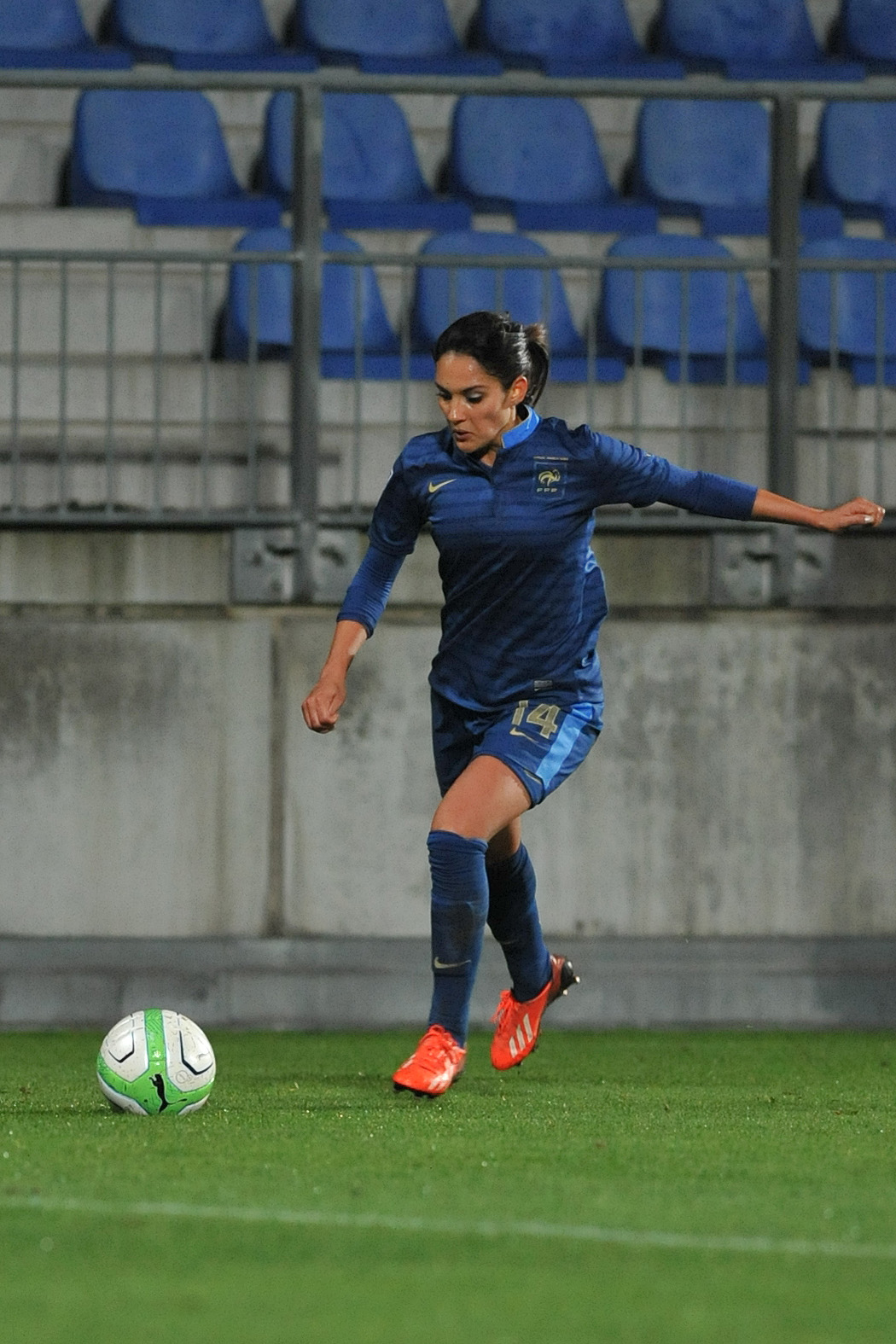
Nécib playing for France in a match against Austria in 2013.

After the firing of Loisel and the appointment of former youth national team coach Bruno Bini in 2007, Nécib became a regular starter in the team and, on 11 April 2007, scored her first international goal in a 6–0 victory over Greece in qualification for UEFA Women's Euro 2009. She featured as a starter in all seven qualification matches she appeared in and scored another qualification goal in an 8–0 away win over Serbia on 27 October 2007 as France qualified for the competition with one match to spare. In the lead up to UEFA Women's Euro 2009, France participated in the 2009 Cyprus Cup. In the competition, Nécib appeared in three matches and scored the team's second goal in a 3–2 group stage win over South Africa. France later finished the competition in third place. Nécib did not participate in the third-place victory over New Zealand. After being selected by Bini to participate in Women's Euro 2009, Nécib scored her fourth international goal in a preparation friendly against Scotland on 12 August 2009. In her second major competition for France, Nécib started all four of the team's matches. She scored her first major international goal in the team's opening group stage match against Iceland netting the final goal in a 3–1 win. France reached the quarter-finals before suffering elimination losing on penalties to the Netherlands.

Following Women's Euro 2009, Nécib returned to the national team duty to participate in qualification for the 2011 FIFA Women's World Cup. In qualification, she participated in nine of the ten qualifying round group stage matches France contested. France finished the stage winning all of its matches and conceding no goals. Nécib scored two goals during the round against Estonia in a 12–0 win and Northern Ireland in a 6–0 victory. In September 2010, she played in both legs of France's World Cup playoff match against Italy. France won the tie 3–2 on aggregate to qualify for its second FIFA Women's World Cup. On 19 November 2010, Nécib scored her first international double in a 5–0 friendly win over Poland. After playing in the 2011 Cyprus Cup and several friendly matches, on 6 June 2011, Nécib was named to the 21-woman squad to participate in the World Cup. On 18 June, in a prep friendly against Belgium, she scored her tenth international goal in a 7–0 home win.

On 26 June 2011, in France's opening World Cup group stage match against Nigeria, Nécib, on her competition's debut, was named the Player of the Match for her performance in the team's 1–0 victory. In the team's second group stage match against Canada, she assisted on the final goal, scored by Thomis, in a 4–0 win. Nécib started France's final four matches in the competition, which included a 4–2 loss against Germany in the team final group stage match and a 4–3 penalty shootout victory over England in the quarter-finals. France were eliminated from the competition in the semi-finals losing 3–1 to the United States after goals from Abby Wambach and Alex Morgan broke a 1–1 deadlock created when Sonia Bompastor had equalized following Lauren Cheney's opener. On 16 July, in the third place match against Sweden, Nécib was forced to leave the match after 30 minutes due to an injury, a sprained knee who forced her to leave the stadium on crutches. France lost 2–1. During and after the competition, Nécib was praised for her performance by several media outlets with one publication declaring that she "was largely responsible for France making it the semi-finals in the first place".

== Style of play ==
"Louisa is a player that there are few of. What she does, it's not in the textbooks. She is an artist. It's sunny when she touches the ball. She radiates the team."

— National team coach Bruno Bini on Nécib's style of play.

Nécib primarily plays as an attacking midfielder, but can also be deployed in central midfield as a deep-lying midfielder, or as a winger. Domestically, she primarily plays as a playmaker in the number 10 role, while at international level, she plays as a winger in Bruno Bini's 4–3–3 formation. Two of Nécib's most common exemplary traits are her vision and passing, which have been described as "one-of-a-kind" and "sublime", respectively. She is also known for her distinct understanding of the game, which has led to her developing "a great football IQ". In addition to her creativity, eye for goal, and tactical awareness, she is known for outstanding control and dribbling ability, as well as her elegance on the ball. Her technical skill and ability to read the game allow her to determine "when to take a defender on one-on-one, how to find a teammate with a slide-rule pass, and how to exploit tight spaces to create scoring chances for herself and her cohorts". For these reasons, her playing style has drawn comparisons with compatriot and 1998 World Cup winner Zinedine Zidane.

== Personal life ==
Nécib was born on 23 January 1987 in the city of Marseille to parents of Algerian origin. Her father had emigrated to France from Biskra, while her mother had come from Oran. Nécib was raised in Busserine, a quartier located in the northern suburbs of the 14th arrondissement of Marseille and has a brother and sister. After signing with Lyon, Nécib enrolled at the Université Lyon 1 with hopes of completing her undergraduate studies in Sciences et techniques des activités physiques et sportives (STAP) (English: Science and Technology of Sport and Physical Activity). She developed an interest in football at a young age, prior to which she trained in gymnastics. She, initially, did not look at the future prospects of women's football and played mainly with males for recreation, stating "I'd always played with the boys in my neighborhood" and "I didn't plan to join a club because, to be honest, I didn't know girls' teams existed. Then, one day I found out there was a club in the 14th arrondissement and I signed up".

In June 2016, she married footballer Liassine Cadamuro-Bentaïba.

== Career statistics ==
=== Club ===
Appearances and goals by club, season and competition
Club	Season	League		Cup		Continental		Total	
Club	Season	Apps	Goals	Apps	Goals	Apps	Goals	Apps	Goals
CNFE Clairefontaine	2004–05	20	6	0	0	–		20	6
CNFE Clairefontaine	2005–06	18	3	0	0	–		18	3
CNFE Clairefontaine	Total	38	9	0	0	0	0	38	9
Montpellier	2006–07	20	11	1	0	–		21	11
Lyon	2007–08	21	8	5	3	10	6	36	17
Lyon	2008–09	19	10	2	1	7	3	28	14
Lyon	2009–10	15	7	3	0	8	4	26	11
Lyon	2010–11	21	14	3	2	9	1	33	17
Lyon	2011–12	21	9	6	1	8	2	35	12
Lyon	2012–13	20	3	7	1	10 (Note: 8 appearances in UEFA Women's Champions League, 2 appearances in International Women's Club Championship)	6 (Note: 5 goals in UEFA Women's Champions League, 1 goal in International Women's Club Championship)	37	10
Lyon	2013–14	21	4	3	1	4	3	28	8
Lyon	2014–15	16	2	3	0	4	2	23	4
Lyon	2015–16	19	7	4	2	8	3	31	12
Lyon	Total	173	64	36	11	68	30	277	105
Career total		231	84	37	11	68	30	336	125

=== International ===
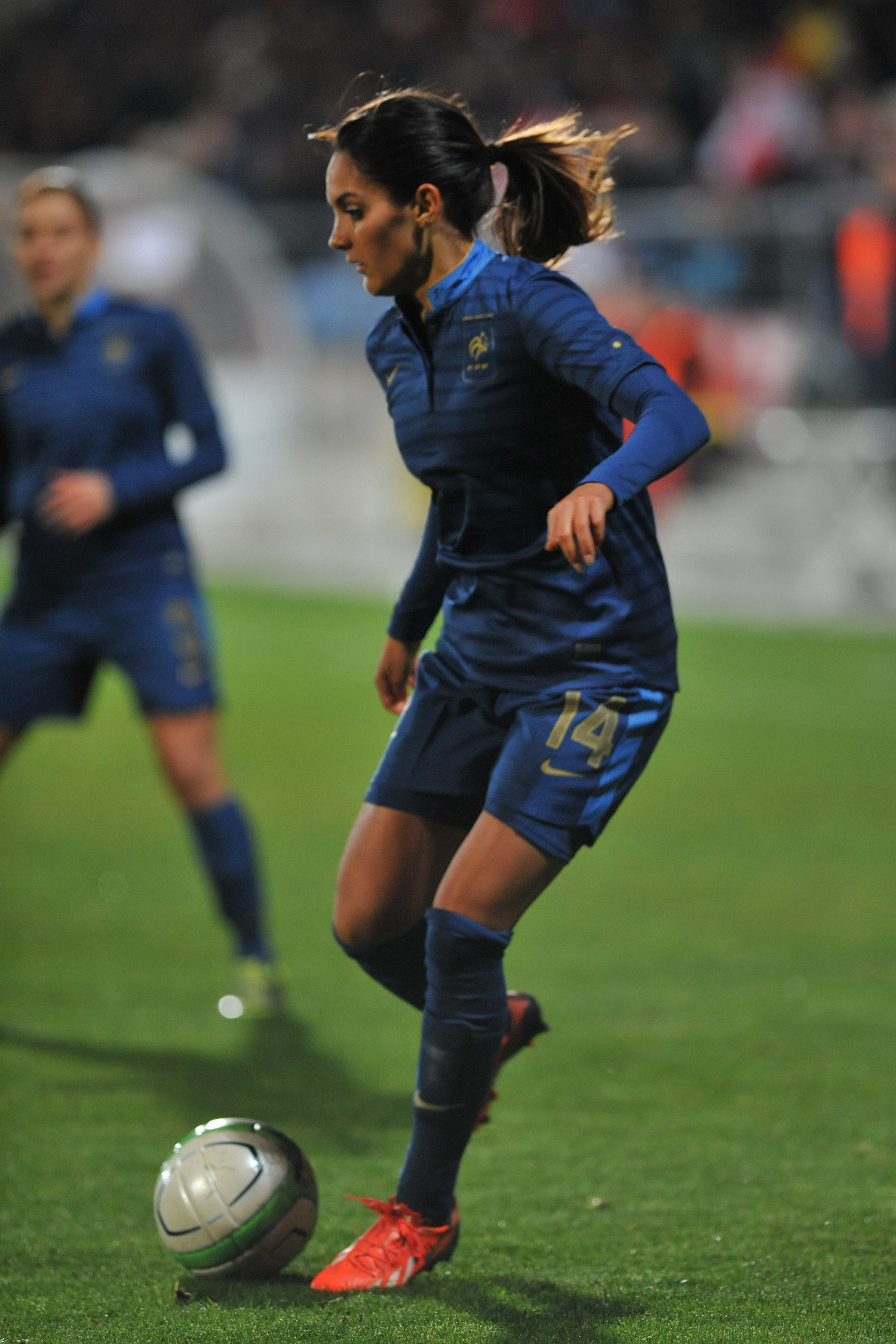
Nécib playing for France in 2013

Appearances and goals by national team and year
National team	Year	Apps	Goals
France	2004–05	3	0
France	2005–06	8	0
France	2006–07	7	1
France	2007–08	6	1
France	2008–09	7	1
France	2009–10	15	4
France	2010–11	14	3
France	2011–12	17	5
France	2012–13	20	5
France	2013–14	21	10
France	2014–15	12	3
France	2015–16	9	1
France	2015–16	6	2
Total		145	36

Scores and results list France's goal tally first, score column indicates score after each Cadamuro goal.

List of international goals scored by Louisa Cadamuro
No.	Date	Venue	Opponent	Score	Result	Competition
1	11 April 2007	Stade Georges Pompidou, Valence, France	Greece	4–0	6–0	UEFA Women's Euro 2009 qualifying
2	27 October 2007	Stadion Kralj Petar I, Belgrade, Serbia	Greece	3–0	8–0	UEFA Women's Euro 2009 qualifying
3	10 March 2009	Makario Stadium, Nicosia, Cyprus	South Africa	2–0	3–2	2009 Cyprus Cup
4	12 August 2009	Stade des Grands Prés, Chartres, France	Scotland	3–0	4–0	Friendly
5	24 August 2009	Ratina Stadion, Tampere, Finland	Iceland	3–1	3–1	UEFA Women's Euro 2009
6	28 October 2009	Stade Jules Deschaseaux, Le Havre, France	Estonia	2–0	12–0	2011 FIFA Women's World Cup qualification
7	27 March 2010	Stade de la Libération, Boulogne-sur-Mer, France	Northern Ireland	5–0	6–0	2011 FIFA Women's World Cup qualification
8	19 November 2010	Stade Jean Bouin, Angers, France	Poland	2–0	5–0	Friendly
9	19 November 2010	Stade Jean Bouin, Angers, France	Poland	3–0	5–0	Friendly
10	18 June 2011	Stade de l'Épopée, Calais, France	Belgium	6–0	7–0	Friendly
11	22 September 2011	Turners Cross, Cork, Ireland	Republic of Ireland	1–0	3–1	UEFA Women's Euro 2013 qualifying
12	16 November 2011	Stade René Serge Nabajoth, Pointe-à-Pitre, Guadeloupe	Uruguay	3–0	8–0	Friendly
13	20 November 2011	Stade Pierre-Aliker, Fort-de-France, Martinique	Mexico	1–0	5–0	Friendly
14	4 March 2012	Paralimni Stadium, Paralimni, Cyprus	England	1–0	3–0	2012 Cyprus Cup
15	6 March 2012	GSZ Stadium, Larnaca, Cyprus	Canada	2–0	2–0	2012 Cyprus Cup
16	4 July 2012	Stade de la Source, Orléans, France	Romania	3–0	6–0	Friendly
17	19 September 2012	Tynecastle Stadium, Edinburgh, Scotland	Scotland	4–0	5–0	UEFA Women's Euro 2013 qualifying
18	13 February 2013	Stade de la Meinau, Strasbourg, France	Germany	1–1	3–3	Friendly
19	13 February 2013	Stade de la Meinau, Strasbourg, France	Germany	2–1	3–3	Friendly
20	9 March 2013	Stade Robert Diochon, Rouen, France	Brazil	1–1	1–1	Friendly
21	18 July 2013	Arena Linköping, Linköping, Sweden	England	2–0	3–0	UEFA Women's Euro 2013
22	22 July 2013	Arena Linköping, Linköping, Sweden	Denmark	1–1	1–1	UEFA Women's Euro 2013
23	20 September 2013	Stade Robert Bobin, Bondoufle, France	Czech Republic	2–0	2–0	Friendly
24	25 October 2013	Stade Pierre Brisson, Beauvais, France	Poland	4–0	6–0	Friendly
25	31 October 2013	Sonnensee Stadion, Ritzing, Austria	Austria	1–0	3–1	2015 FIFA Women's World Cup qualification
26	28 November 2013	MMArena, Le Mans, France	Bulgaria	4–0	14–0	2015 FIFA Women's World Cup qualification
27	8 February 2014	Stade de la Licorne, Amiens, France	Sweden	2–0	3–0	Friendly
28	8 February 2014	Stade de la Licorne, Amiens, France	Sweden	3–0	3–0	Friendly
29	7 March 2014	GSP Stadium, Nicosia, Cyprus	Australia	3–0	3–2	2014 Cyprus Cup
30	20 June 2014	Rentschler Field, Hartford, USA	United States	1–0	2–2	Friendly
31	13 September 2014	ISS Stadion, Vantaa, Finland	Finland	1–0	2–0	2015 FIFA Women's World Cup qualification
32	17 September 2014	Stade de l'Épopée, Calais, France	Finland	2–1	3–1	2015 FIFA Women's World Cup qualification
33	26 June 2015	Olympic Stadium, Montreal, Canada	Germany	1–0	1–1	2015 FIFA Women's World Cup
34	26 January 2016	La Manga Stadium, La Manga, Spain	Norway	1–0	1–0	Friendly
35	9 August 2016	Arena Fonte Nova, Salvador, Brazil	New Zealand	2–0	3–0	2016 Olympic Games
36	9 August 2016	Arena Fonte Nova, Salvador, Brazil	New Zealand	3–0	3–0	2016 Olympic Games

== Honours ==
Celtic Marseille

- Division 3 Féminine: 2003–04

Montpellier

- Challenge de France: 2006–07

Lyon

- Division 1 Féminine (9): 2007–08, 2008–09, 2009–10, 2010–11, 2011–12, 2012–13, 2013–14, 2014–15, 2015–16
- Coupe de France Féminine (6): 2007–08, 2011–12, 2012–13, 2013–14, 2014–15, 2015–16
- UEFA Women's Champions League: 2010–11, 2011–12, 2015–16
- International Women's Club Championship: 2012
- Valais Cup: 2014

France

- Cyprus Cup: 2012, 2014

Individual

- UNFP Female Player of the Year: 2008–09
- FIFA Women's World Cup All-Star Team: 2011
- FIFA Puskás Award nominee 2013
