= Laura Agard =

French footballer (born 1989)

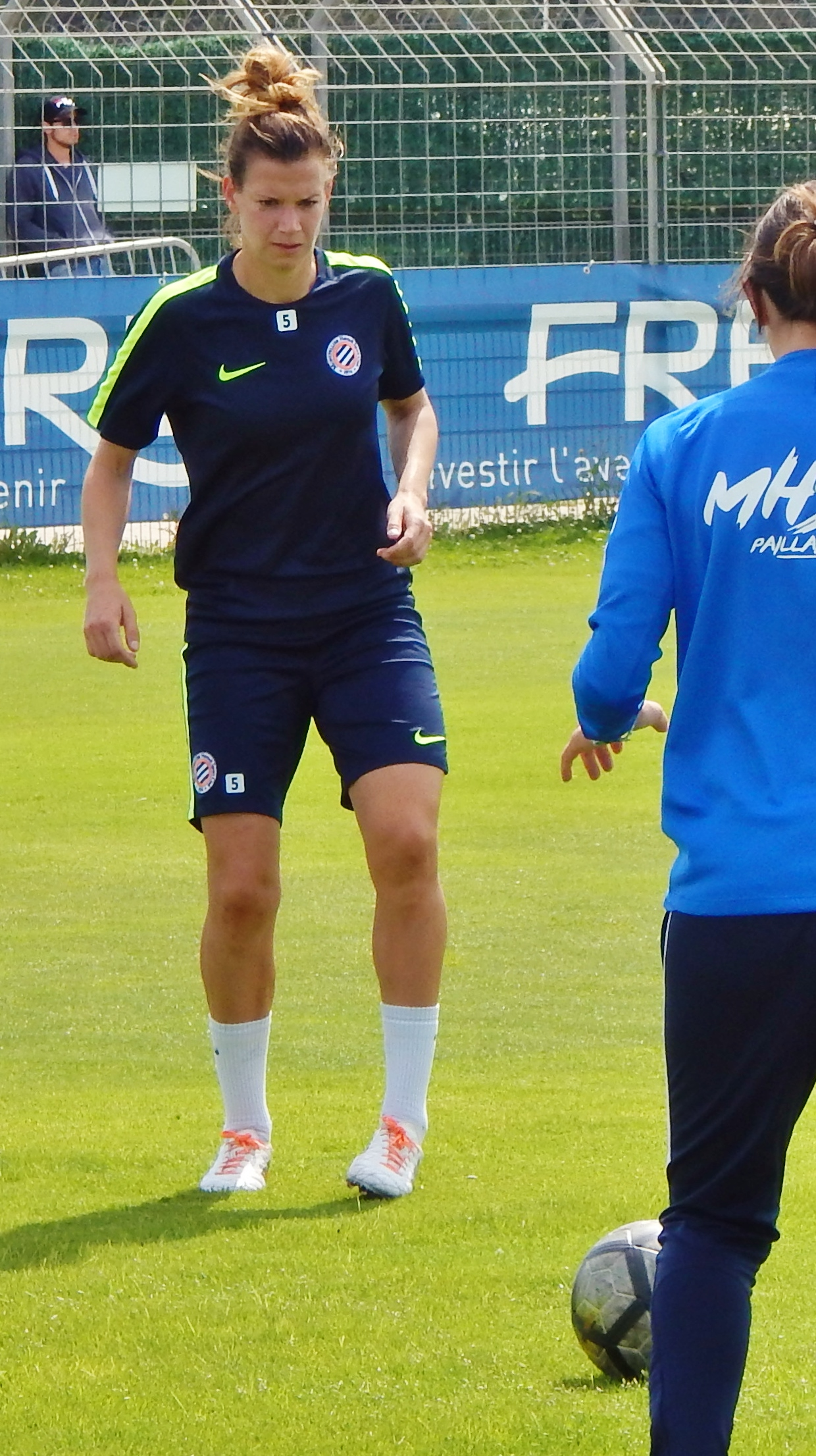
- Agard with Montpellier HSC in 2018

Personal information
- Date of birth: 26 July 1989 (age 37)
- Place of birth: L'Union, France
- Height: 1.75 m (5 ft 9 in)
- Position: Centre back

Senior career*
Years	Team	Apps	(Gls)
2010–2012	Rodez	26	(5)
2012–2013	Lyon	11	(0)
2015–2018	Montpellier	53	(4)
2018–2020	Fiorentina	30	(1)
2020–2022	Milan	42	(1)
2022–2024	Fiorentina	43	(2)

International career
2004–2006	France U17	13	(0)
2006–2008	France U19	22	(2)
2008	France U20	8	(0)
- * Club domestic league appearances and goals

Laura Agard (born 26 July 1989) is a French professional footballer who plays as a centre back.

== Honours ==
Montpellier

- Coupe de France Féminine: 2007, 2009

Lyon

- Division 1 Féminine: 2012–13
- Coupe de France Féminine: 2013
- UEFA Women's Champions League: 2013
- International Women's Club Championship: 2012

France

- Summer Universiade: 2015 Gold medal.
