= 2014–15 Division 1 Féminine =

Division 1 Féminine
- Season: 2014–15
- Champions: Lyon
- Relegated: Metz; Arras; Issy
- Champions League: Lyon; Paris Saint-Germain
- Matches: 132
- Goals: 550 (4.17 per match)
- Top goalscorer: Lotta Schelin (34 goals)
- Biggest home win: Lyon 14–0 Albi (18 January 2015); Lyon 14–0 Arras (3 May 2015)
- Biggest away win: Metz 0–15 Lyon (7 September 2014)
- Highest scoring: Metz 0–15 Lyon (7 September 2014)
- Longest winning run: 22 games Lyon
- Longest unbeaten run: 22 games Lyon
- Longest winless run: 15 games Issy
- Longest losing run: 9 games Arras
- All statistics correct as of 9 May 2015.

The 2014–15 Division 1 Féminine season was the 41st since its establishment. Lyon were the defending champions. The season began on 30 August 2014 and ended on 9 May 2015. The winter break began on 22 December 2014 and ended on 9 January 2015.

== Teams ==
Location of teams in 2014–15 Division 1 Féminine

There were three promoted teams from the Division 2 Féminine, the second level of women's football in France, replacing the three teams that were relegated from the Division 1 Féminine following the 2013–14 season. A total of 12 teams currently compete in the league with three clubs suffering relegation to the second division, Division 2 Féminine.

Teams promoted to 2014–15 Division 1 Féminine

- Albi
- Issy
- Metz

Teams relegated to 2014–15 Division 2 Féminine

- Hénin-Beaumont
- Muret
- Yzeure

=== Stadia and locations ===
Club	Location	Venue	Capacity
Arras	Arras	Stade Degouve-Brabant	3,000
Albi	Albi	Stade Maurice-Rigaud	3,000
Guingamp	Saint-Brieuc	Stade Fred-Aubert	13,500
Issy	Issy-les-Moulineaux	Stade Gabriel-Voisin	1,000
Juvisy	Bondoufle	Stade Robert Bobin	18,850
Lyon	Lyon	Plaine des Jeux de Gerland	2,200
Metz	Algrange	Stade du Batzenthal	3,000
Montpellier	Montpellier	Stade de Grammont	1,000
Paris Saint-Germain	Paris	Stade Charléty	20,000
Rodez	Rodez	Stade Paul-Lignon	5,955
Saint-Étienne	Feurs	Stade Maurice Rousson	2,800
Soyaux	Soyaux	Stade Léo Lagrange	4,800

== League table ==
Note: A win in D1 Féminine is worth 4 points, with 2 points for a draw and 1 for a defeat.

Pos	Team	Pld	W	D	L	GF	GA	GD	Pts	Qualification or relegation
1	Lyon (C, Q)	22	22	0	0	147	6	+141	88	Qualification for Women's Champions League
2	Paris Saint-Germain (Q)	22	20	0	2	88	9	+79	82	Qualification for Women's Champions League
3	Juvisy	22	15	0	7	53	25	+28	67	
4	Montpellier	22	13	5	4	63	20	+43	66	
5	Guingamp	22	13	3	6	41	31	+10	64	
6	Soyaux	22	7	5	10	26	57	−31	48	
7	Rodez	22	7	3	12	33	50	−17	46	
8	Saint-Étienne	22	7	1	14	24	46	−22	44	
9	Albi	22	7	1	14	21	65	−44	44	
10	Metz (R)	22	5	4	13	27	77	−50	41	Relegation to Division 2 Féminine
11	Arras (R)	22	1	3	18	14	89	−75	28	Relegation to Division 2 Féminine
12	Issy (R)	22	1	3	18	13	75	−62	28	Relegation to Division 2 Féminine

Updated to match(es) played on 9 May 2015. Source: statsfootofeminin.fr (in French)
Rules for classification: 1st points; 2nd head-to-head goal difference; 3rd total goal difference
(C) Champions; (Q) Qualified for the phase indicated; (R) Relegated

== Results ==
Home \ Away	ARA	ALB	GUI	ISS	JUV	LYO	MET	MON	PSG	ROD	SET	SOY
Arras		0–3	0–2	3–1	0–4	2–8	0–2	0–6	0–3	0–5	1–1	2–3
ASPTT Albi	3–1		1–2	5–0	0–3	0–4	2–0	1–7	0–4	2–1	1–0	1–1
Guingamp	2–0	3–0		1–0	1–6	0–3	2–2	1–1	0–3	4–2	3–2	1–2
Issy	1–1	0–2	0–4		1–5	0–9	0–1	1–3	0–2	2–3	0–3	0–0
Juvisy	4–0	4–0	1–2	3–1		1–4	4–0	1–3	0–3	2–0	3–0	3–0
Lyon	14–0	14–0	3–0	6–0	4–0		11–0	4–0	2–1	7–0	5–1	9–0
Metz	3–1	7–0	0–2	1–1	1–3	0–15		2–2	0–9	2–3	0–1	1–1
Montpellier	8–0	3–0	0–0	9–0	3–1	1–5	5–0		0–1	0–0	1–0	1–0
Paris Saint-Germain	5–0	6–0	2–1	5–0	2–0	0–4	7–0	2–1		5–0	2–0	6–0
Rodez	1–1	2–0	2–4	5–1	0–1	0–6	1–2	0–4	1–3		1–0	0–0
Saint-Étienne	5–1	2–0	1–2	1–2	0–1	0–6	2–1	0–4	0–7	1–4		2–0
Soyaux	5–1	1–0	0–4	3–2	0–3	0–4	5–2	1–1	0–10	3–2	1–2	

Updated to match(es) played on 9 May 2015. Source: statsfootofeminin.fr (in French)
Legend: Blue = home team win; Yellow = draw; Red = away team win.

== Season statistics ==
=== Top scorers ===
Updated to games played on 9 May 2015

Rank	Player	Club	Goals
1	(Sweden) Lotta Schelin	Lyon	34
2	(France) Eugénie Le Sommer	Lyon	29
3	(Norway) Ada Hegerberg	Lyon	26
4	(Sweden) Sofia Jakobsson	Montpellier	15
4	(France) Sarah Palacin	Saint-Étienne	15
6	(France) Marie-Laure Delie	Paris Saint-Germain	14
6	(France) Flavie Lemaître	Rodez	14
6	(France) Gaëtane Thiney	Juvisy	14
9	(Sweden) Kosovare Asllani	Paris Saint-Germain	13
10	(France) Camille Abily	Lyon	12
10	(France) Sandrine Brétigny	Juvisy	12

=== Hat-tricks ===
Updated to games played on 9 May 2015

Player	For	Against	Result	Date
(Sweden) Lotta Schelin	Lyon	Metz	15–0	7 September 2014
(Norway) Ada Hegerberg	Lyon	Metz	15–0	7 September 2014
(Sweden) Kosovare Asllani	PSG	Metz	7–0	21 September 2014
(France) Clarisse Le Bihan	Guingamp	Soyaux	4–0	12 October 2014
(Norway) Ada Hegerberg^{4}	Lyon	Soyaux	9–0	19 October 2014
(France) Gaëtane Thiney	Juvisy	Guingamp	6–1	9 November 2014
(France) Eugénie Le Sommer	Lyon	Saint-Étienne	6–0	3 December 2014
(France) Marie-Laure Delie	PSG	Soyaux	6–0	3 December 2014
(France) Julie Morel	Saint-Étienne	Arras	5–1	7 December 2014
(Sweden) Lotta Schelin^{4}	Lyon	Metz	11–0	7 December 2014
(Norway) Ada Hegerberg	Lyon	Metz	11–0	7 December 2014
(Sweden) Sofia Jakobsson	Montpellier	ASPTT Albi	7–1	7 December 2014
(France) Eugénie Le Sommer	Lyon	Issy	9–0	11 January 2015
(Sweden) Lotta Schelin^{4}	Lyon	ASPTT Albi	14–0	18 January 2015
(France) Marie-Laure Delie^{4}	PSG	Soyaux	10–0	21 January 2015
(France) Sarah Palacin	Saint-Étienne	Issy	3–0	1 February 2015
(Sweden) Lotta Schelin^{4}	Lyon	Arras	14–0	3 May 2015
(France) Ouleye Sarr^{4}	PSG	Rodez	5–0	3 May 2015
(France) Sandrine Brétigny	Juvisy	Soyaux	3–0	9 May 2015
(United States) Megan Lindsay	Metz	ASPTT Albi	7–0	9 May 2015
(France) Valérie Gauvin	Montpellier	Issy	9–0	9 May 2015
(Sweden) Sofia Jakobsson	Montpellier	Issy	9–0	9 May 2015

^{4} Player scored 4 goals
