= Camilla Schelin =

Swedish footballer

Personal information
- Full name: Camilla Gun Schelin
- Date of birth: 2 March 1982 (age 44)
- Place of birth: Trångsund, Sweden
- Height: 1.75 m (5 ft 9 in)
- Position: Defender

Youth career
- 1990: Kållereds SK
- 1991–1998: Hällesåkers IF
- 1999–2000: Mölnlycke IF

Senior career*
Years	Team	Apps	(Gls)
2001–2008	Göteborg FC	89	(4)
2009	Jitex BK		
2010–2013	Falkenbergs FF		
2014	Lindome GIF		
- * Club domestic league appearances and goals ‡ National team caps and goals as of 21:50, 17 August 2016 (UTC)

Camilla Gun Schelin (born 2 March 1982) is a Swedish former footballer who played as a defender for Kopparbergs/Göteborg FC of the Damallsvenskan. Her sister is the footballer Lotta Schelin.

== International career ==
Schelin won seven caps for the Sweden women's national under-17 football team.

== Personal life ==
In 2015 Schelin was married to Fredrik and had a baby son named Melvin.
