= Bev Yanez =

American soccer player and coach (born 1988)

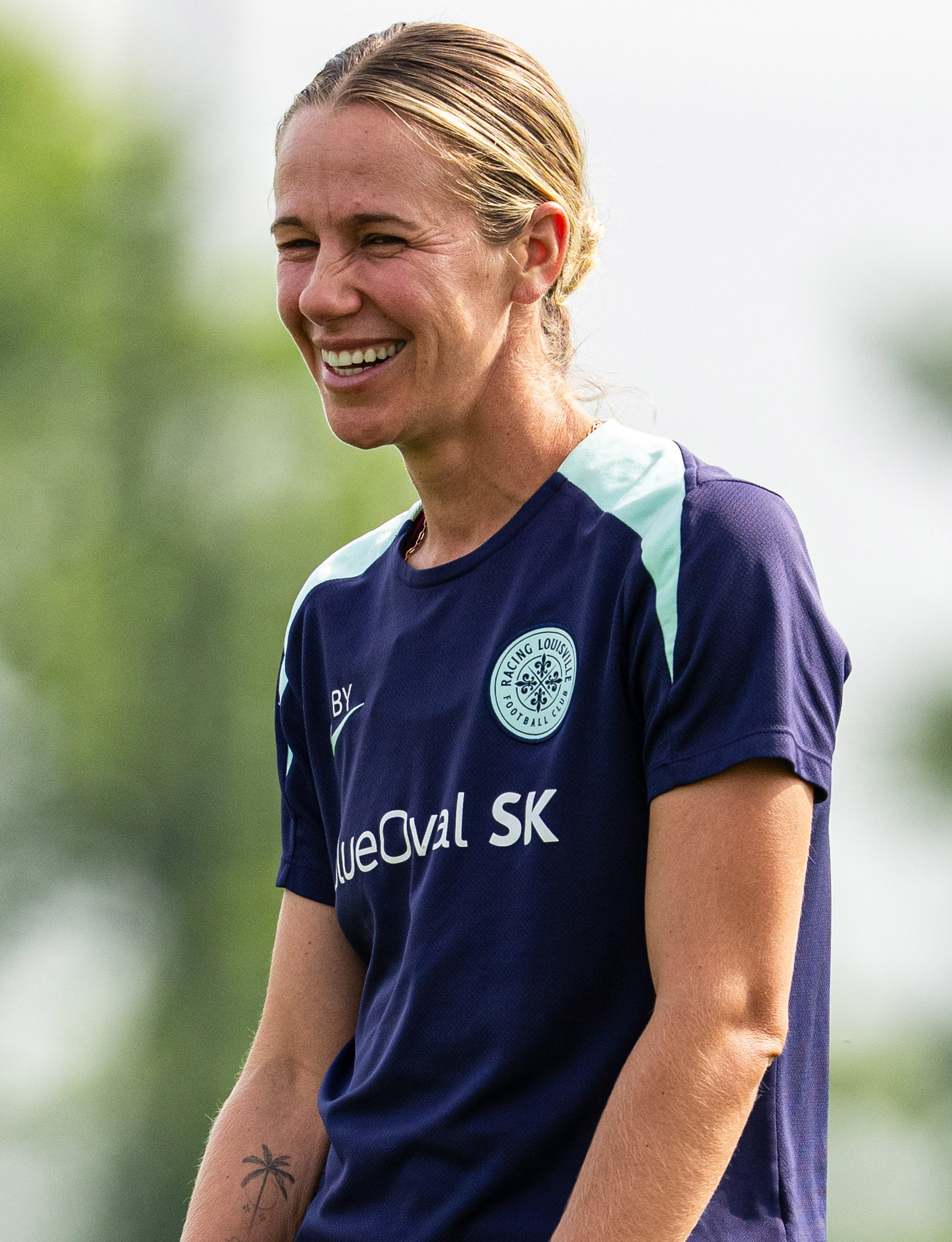
- Yanez with Racing Louisville FC in 2025

Personal information
- Full name: Beverly Goebel Yanez
- Birth name: Beverly June Goebel
- Date of birth: July 19, 1988 (age 38)
- Place of birth: Moreno Valley, California, United States
- Height: 5 ft 8 in (1.73 m)
- Position: Forward

Team information
- Current team: Racing Louisville (head coach)

Youth career
- Freedom United

College career
Years	Team	Apps	(Gls)
2006	Sacramento State Hornets		
2007–2009	Miami Hurricanes		

Senior career*
Years	Team	Apps	(Gls)
2010	Washington Freedom	16	(1)
2011	Western New York Flash	15	(1)
2011	PK-35	6	(1)
2012–2014	INAC Kobe Leonessa	24	(19)
2014	→ Seattle Reign (loan)	24	(5)
2015–2019	Reign FC	99	(20)
2016–2017	→ Melbourne City (loan)	11	(2)
Total		195	(49)

Managerial career
- 2021–2022: NJ/NY Gotham (assistant)
- 2023: Racing Louisville (assistant)
- 2024–: Racing Louisville
- * Club domestic league appearances and goals

Beverly Goebel Yanez (born Beverly June Goebel; July 19, 1988) is an American soccer coach and former professional player. She is the head coach of Racing Louisville FC in the National Women's Soccer League (NWSL). Yanez played as a forward for Reign FC in the NWSL, Melbourne City in the Australian W-League, INAC Kobe Leonessa in the Japanese Nadeshiko.League, and PK-35 in Finland's Naisten Liiga, as well as the Western New York Flash and the Washington Freedom in the Women's Professional Soccer (WPS) league.

Yanez was the top scorer in Japan's Nadeshiko league in 2013, earning the Golden Boot award, and was a top scorer for the Seattle Reign of the NWSL during the 2014 and 2015 seasons. She was named to Best XI teams in both top-division leagues. On February 10, 2020, Yanez announced her retirement from professional soccer.

== Early life ==
Raised in Moreno Valley, California, Yanez attended Moreno Valley High School, where she helped lead the girls' soccer team to win the Coast Soccer League and was named the League's MVP and offensive MVP. She played for club team Freedom United for two years, helping the team to the 2004 Nike Harvest Cup and Coast Soccer League championships.

=== Sacramento State University, 2006 ===
In 2006, Yanez attended Sacramento State University. As a freshman, she finished fourth on the team in scoring with two goals and six assists and received an All-Big Sky Honorable Mention. Her six assists ranked second on the team and third in the Big Sky Conference. Yanez recorded a team-high 66 shots and ranked third in the Big Sky Conference with 3.19 shots per game.

=== University of Miami, 2007–2009 ===
Yanez transferred after her freshman year to the University of Miami for the remainder of her collegiate career. During her sophomore year, she played in all 21 matches, starting 20 and finishing the season third in scoring with four goals and four assists. She served an assist in three straight matches against Alabama A&M University, Samford University, and Louisiana State University. She ranked third on the team in both shots (38) and shots on goal (19). As a junior she played in 13 matches, starting 12, and finished the season with three assists. As a senior, Yanez captained the team and finished her career at Miami having started 51 of 53 games.

== Professional career ==
=== Club ===
==== WPS Years, 2010–2011 ====
Yanez was selected by the Washington Freedom in the third round of the 2010 WPS Draft. She started in nine of 16 games for the Freedom in 2010 and scored her first professional goal, against the Chicago Red Stars, on Sep. 5.

In November 2010, Yanez was drafted by the expansion team Western New York Flash in the second round (27th overall) of the 2010 WPS Expansion Draft. She started three times in 14 total games during the 2011 WPS season, scoring one goal and providing one assist. The Flash won the 2011 WPS Championship after defeating the Philadelphia Independence in penalty kicks.

==== Pallokerho-35, 2011 ====
In 2011, Yanez signed with Finnish team, Pallokerho-35. She started in all six games in which she played for a total of 540 minutes and tallied one goal. The team won the Finnish Women's Cup after a 2–0 win over Ilves.

In early January 2012, Yanez signed with Sky Blue FC; however, later that month the WPS suspended operations before the season began.

==== INAC Kobe Leonessa, 2012–2014 ====
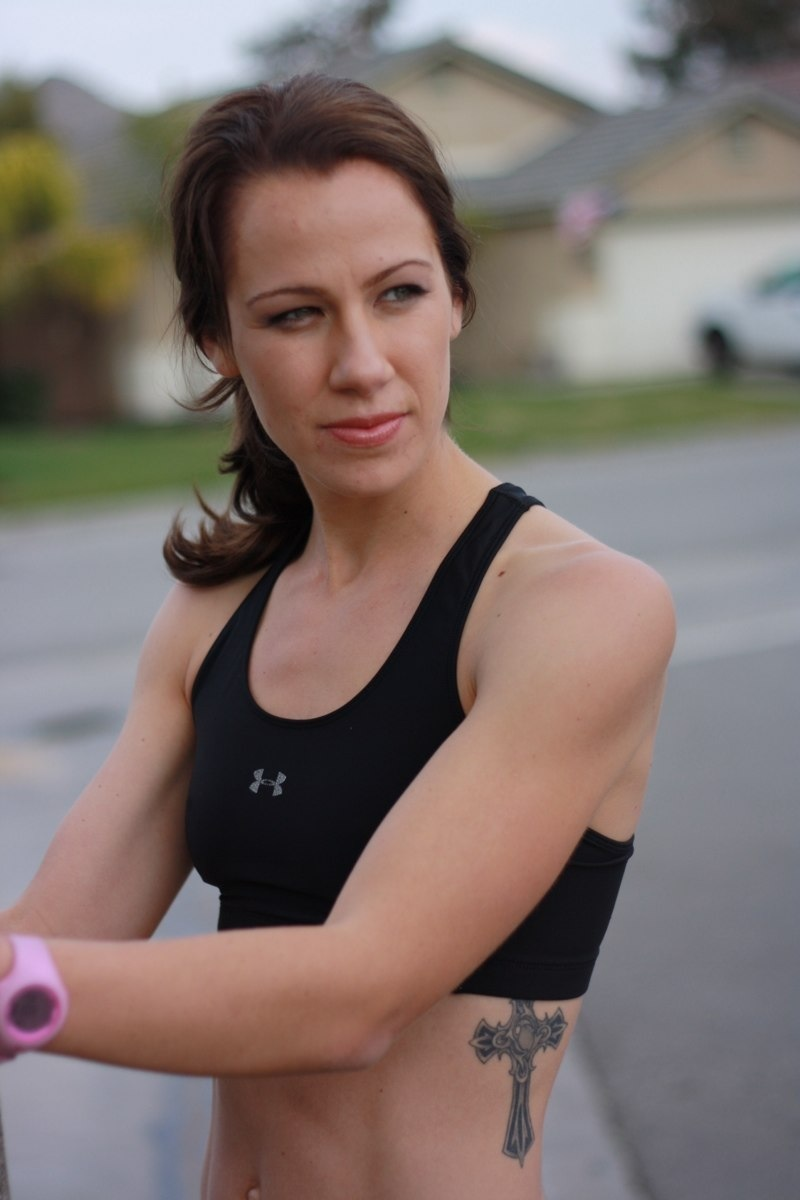
Yanez in 2013

Yanez went with Sky Blue FC (now without a league) on a tour of Nadeshiko League teams in Japan. They played a friendly against INAC Kobe Leonessa, who were sufficiently impressed with her to offer her a contract in April 2012. During her first season with the team, Yanez played as a center-forward (previously she had played almost entirely in midfield) and scored 13 goals, including two goals at the 2012 International Women's Club Championship where INAC finished second. INAC won the league championship and the Empress's Cup the same year.

As the league's top scorer in 2013, Yanez earned the league's Golden Boot award and was named to the Best XI after helping the team win the league championship for the second consecutive season. Yanez became the first foreign top scorer in the league since the 1990s. In December 2013, she helped the team win the Mobcast Cup, the unofficial women's club world championship tournament, after scoring a penalty kick to help INAC defeat Chelsea LFC 4–2. Her two goals at the tournament tied with Francisca Lara, Emi Nakajima, and Renee Rollason as the top scorer at the tournament.

==== Reign FC, 2014–2019 ====
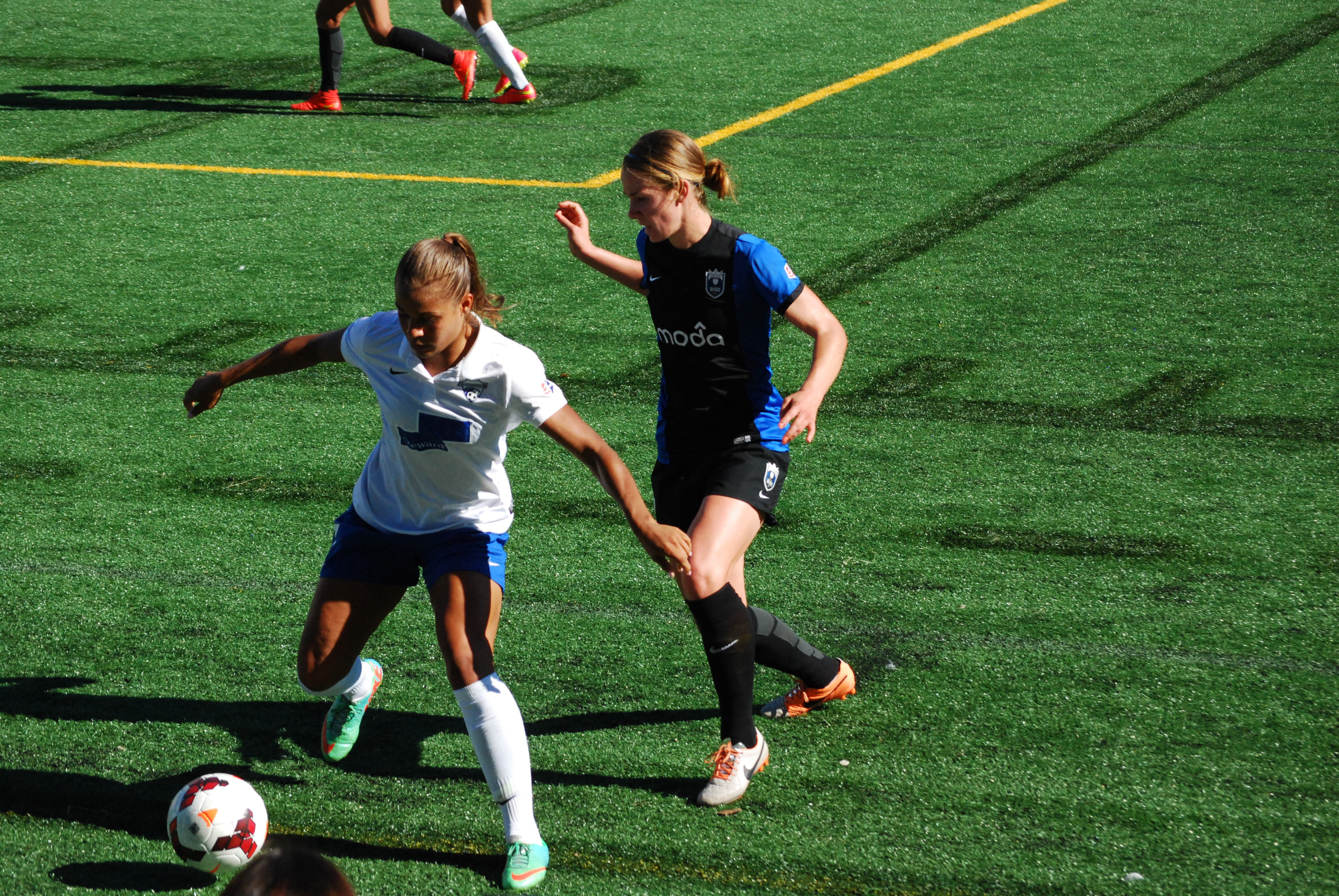
Yanez during a match against the Boston Breakers, July 2014

In December 2013, Yanez signed with Seattle Reign FC on loan from INAC Kobe Leonessa for the second season of the National Women's Soccer League. Of the signing, Reign FC head coach Laura Harvey said, "We immediately knew that Bev would be a massive addition to our club, so we made it a priority to find a way to bring her to Seattle for the 2014 season."

During the 2014 season, Yanez helped the Reign set a league record unbeaten streak of 16 games during the first part of the season, going 13–0–3 (W-L-D). The Reign finished first in the regular season, clinching the NWSL Shield for the first time. After defeating the Washington Spirit 2–1 in the playoff semi-finals, the Reign were defeated 2–1 by FC Kansas City during the championship final. Yanez was the only Reign player to appear in all 24 regular season games and both playoff games, scoring 5 goals along the way.

After returning to INAC and playing for the rest of the 2014 Nadeshiko League season, Yanez signed for the Reign permanently ahead of the 2015 season. That year, Yanez was the second-highest scorer on the team, her 9 goals following Kim Little with 10. The Reign finished the regular season in first place, clinching the NWSL Shield for the second consecutive time. After advancing to the playoffs, Seattle faced fourth-place team Washington Spirit. Yanez scored the game-opening goal in the 71st minute after subbing in following a hip strain injury that had kept her from the pitch for a few games. After defeating the Spirit 3–0, the Reign advanced to the championship final. Seattle was ultimately defeated 1–0 by FC Kansas City during the championship final in Portland. Yanez, along with teammates Lauren Barnes, Kim Little, and Jess Fishlock, were named to the NWSL Best XI team.

On February 10, 2020, Yanez announced her retirement from professional soccer.

==== Melbourne City ====
On November 14, 2016, Reign FC announced that Yanez would be loaned to Australian club Melbourne City for the NWSL off-season.

== Coaching career ==
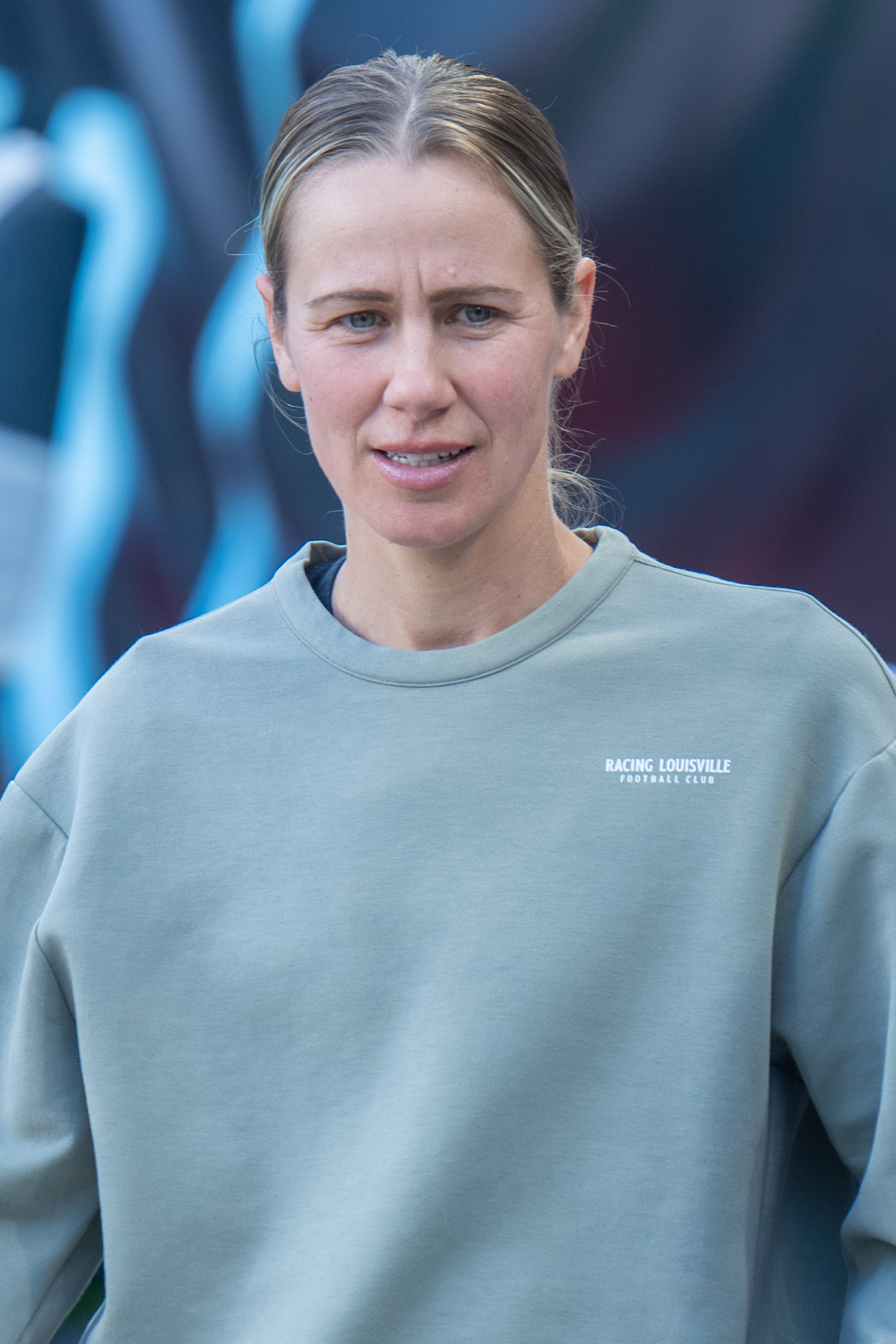
Yanez coaching Racing Louisville in 2026

Yanez served as an assistant coach for NJ/NY Gotham FC from 2021 to 2022. In November 2022, Racing Louisville FC named her as an assistant coach for the 2023 NWSL season.

Yanez was appointed as Racing Louisville's head coach in November 2023. In the 2025 season, she guided the team to its first playoff appearance. Yanez was named the NWSL Coach of the Year for the 2025 season.

== Personal life ==
Yanez is married to former Columbus Crew midfielder Othaniel Yáñez. On December 5, 2020, Yanez gave birth to their first daughter, Noemi-Rae. Their second daughter, Cali June, was born on November 8, 2023.

== Career statistics ==
=== Player ===
Club	Season	League		National Cup		League Cup		Total	
Club	Season	Apps	Goals	Apps	Goals	Apps	Goals	Apps	Goals
Washington Freedom	2010	16	1	-	-	-	-	16	1
Western New York Flash	2011	15	1	-	-	1	0	15	1
Pallokerho-35	2011	6	1	-	-	-	-	6	1
INAC Kobe Leonessa	2012	9	4	4	2	6	7	19	13
INAC Kobe Leonessa	2013	15	15	2	1	10	6	27	22
INAC Kobe Leonessa	INAC Total	24	19	6	3	16	13	46	35
Reign FC	2014	24	5	-	-	2	0	26	5
Reign FC	2015	17	9	-	-	2	1	19	10
Reign FC	2016	20	3	-	-	-	-	17	9
Reign FC	2017	22	4	-	-	-	-	22	4
Reign FC	2018	19	2	-	-	1	0	20	2
Reign FC	2019	21	1	-	-	1	0	22	1
Reign FC	SRFC Total	123	24	-	-	6	1	126	31
Career total		184	46	6	3	23	14	209	69

=== Head coach ===
As of November 1, 2026

Team	Nat.	Year (Note: Statistics include NWSL Playoffs)	Record				
Team	Nat.	Year	G	W	D	L	Win %
Racing Louisville FC	(United States)	2024	26	7	7	12	26.92
Racing Louisville FC	(United States)	2025	27	10	8	9	37.04
Racing Louisville FC	(United States)	2026	30	7	3	20	23.33
Career total			83	24	18	41	28.92

== Honors ==
=== Player ===
Pallokerho-35

- Finnish Women's Cup: 2011

Western New York Flash

- WPS Championship: 2011
- WPSL-Elite Championship: 2012

INAC Kobe Leonessa

- Nadeshiko League (2): 2012, 2013
- Empress's Cup All-Japan Women's Football Tournament (2): 2012, 2013
- Nadeshiko League Cup (1): 2013
- International Women's Club Championship (1): 2013

Seattle Reign FC

- NWSL Shield (regular season winners): 2014, 2015
- NWSL Championship Runners-Up: 2014, 2015

Individual

- Nadeshiko League Top Scorers (1): 2013
- Nadeshiko League Best Eleven (1): 2013
- International Women's Club Championship Top Scorer (2): 2012, 2013
- NWSL Best XI (1): 2015

=== Coach ===
- NWSL Coach of the Year: 2025

== See also ==
- List of University of Miami alumni
- List of Seattle Reign FC players
