= Lotta Schelin =

Swedish footballer (born 1984)

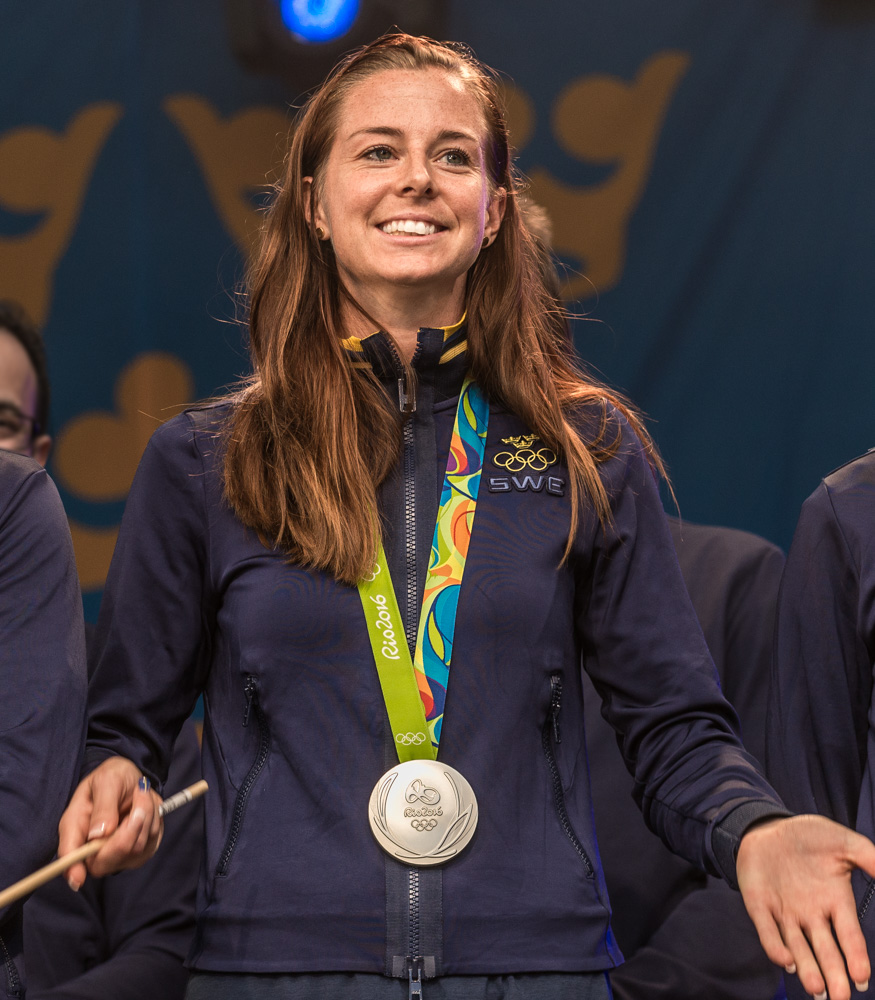
- Schelin in 2016

Personal information
- Full name: Charlotta Eva Schelin
- Date of birth: 27 February 1984 (age 42)
- Place of birth: Trångsund, Sweden
- Height: 1.79 m (5 ft 10 in)
- Position: Forward

Youth career
- 1990: Kållereds SK
- 1991–1998: Hällesåkers IF
- 1999–2000: Mölnlycke IF

Senior career*
Years	Team	Apps	(Gls)
2001–2008	Göteborg	123	(92)
2008–2016	Lyon	138	(143)
2016–2018	FC Rosengård	17	(10)
Total		278	(245)

International career
2000–2001	Sweden U17	6	(3)
2001–2002	Sweden U19	7	(2)
2004–2017	Sweden	185	(88)
Medal record
Representing Sweden
Women's football
Olympic Games
Silver medal – second place	2016 Rio de Janeiro	Team
FIFA Women's World Cup
Third place	2011 Germany
- * Club domestic league appearances and goals

Charlotta Eva Schelin (born 27 February 1984) is a Swedish former professional footballer who played as a forward.

She made her debut for the Sweden national team in March 2004 and was appointed joint captain alongside Caroline Seger in October 2012. Schelin has represented her country in the 2005, 2009, 2013, and 2017 editions of the UEFA Women's Championship, as well as the 2007, 2011, and 2015 FIFA Women's World Cups. She also played at the Olympic football tournaments in 2004, 2008, 2012 and 2016.

In October 2014, Schelin became Sweden's all time record goalscorer by scoring her 73rd international goal in a friendly defeat by Germany.

Schelin began her senior club career with Kopparbergs/Göteborg FC (then known as Landvetter FC) in 2001. She developed into a prolific goalscorer in the Damallsvenskan then made a lucrative transfer to Lyon in 2008, rejecting a competing offer from the American Women's Professional Soccer league. During her eight-season stay at Lyon, she won eight consecutive Division 1 Féminine titles, five Coupes de France Féminine, three UEFA Women's Champions Leagues and was the top goalscorer in the 2012–13 and 2014–15 Division 1 Féminine seasons. In 2013, she became the first foreign UNFP Player of the Year. In 2016, she returned to Swedish football with FC Rosengård, departing Lyon as the French club's all time record goalscorer with 225 goals in 225 appearances. She has been awarded Diamantbollen (the Diamond Ball), given to the Swedish player of the year, a record five times, including four consecutive times from 2011 to 2014.

On 30 August 2018, she announced her retirement due to chronic head and neck pain resulting from an injury suffered while playing for FC Rosengård in 2017.

== Early life ==
Although Schelin was born in Stockholm, her family moved away from the capital when she was two years old. With her father Kjell and mother Nina, she grew up in Kållered outside Gothenburg and began to play football for Kållereds SK along with her older sister, Camilla. She has also played for Hällesåkers IF and Mölnlycke IF. Schelin was also adept at sports including table-tennis, track and field, and snowboarding before opting to focus on football full-time. As a teenager, she developed problems with her spine and was advised to stop playing the sport. Schelin went through intensive strength training and recovered by the time she turned 17. She credited her sister and former teammate Camilla and Tina Nordlund as important role models for her.

== Club career ==
=== Göteborg FC ===
In 2001, when she was 17 years old, Schelin made her debut in the Damallsvenskan for Landvetter FC, now known as Göteborg FC. Her debut season yielded eight goals in 19 appearances. After an injury in August 2002, she was out of the league for almost a year and a half, returning in June 2003. In 2004 Schelin was named Breakthrough Player of the Year after netting 14 goals in 15 games for Göteborg. In 2006, Schelin scored 21 goals in 21 league games. At the end of season Fotbollsgalan, she was named Forward of the Year, Player of the Year and Top Goalscorer. She was also shortlisted for the 2006 FIFA World Player of the Year and was recognised by Swedish referees with a special award for her sporting treatment of opponents and officials. In 2007, she retained her top scorer title by scoring 26 league goals. Despite persistent interest from leading Damallsvenskan clubs including Umeå IK and Linköpings FC, Schelin opted to stay at her hometown team. She ultimately played in over 120 league matches with Göteborg, establishing herself as one of the club's most prominent players.

=== Lyon ===
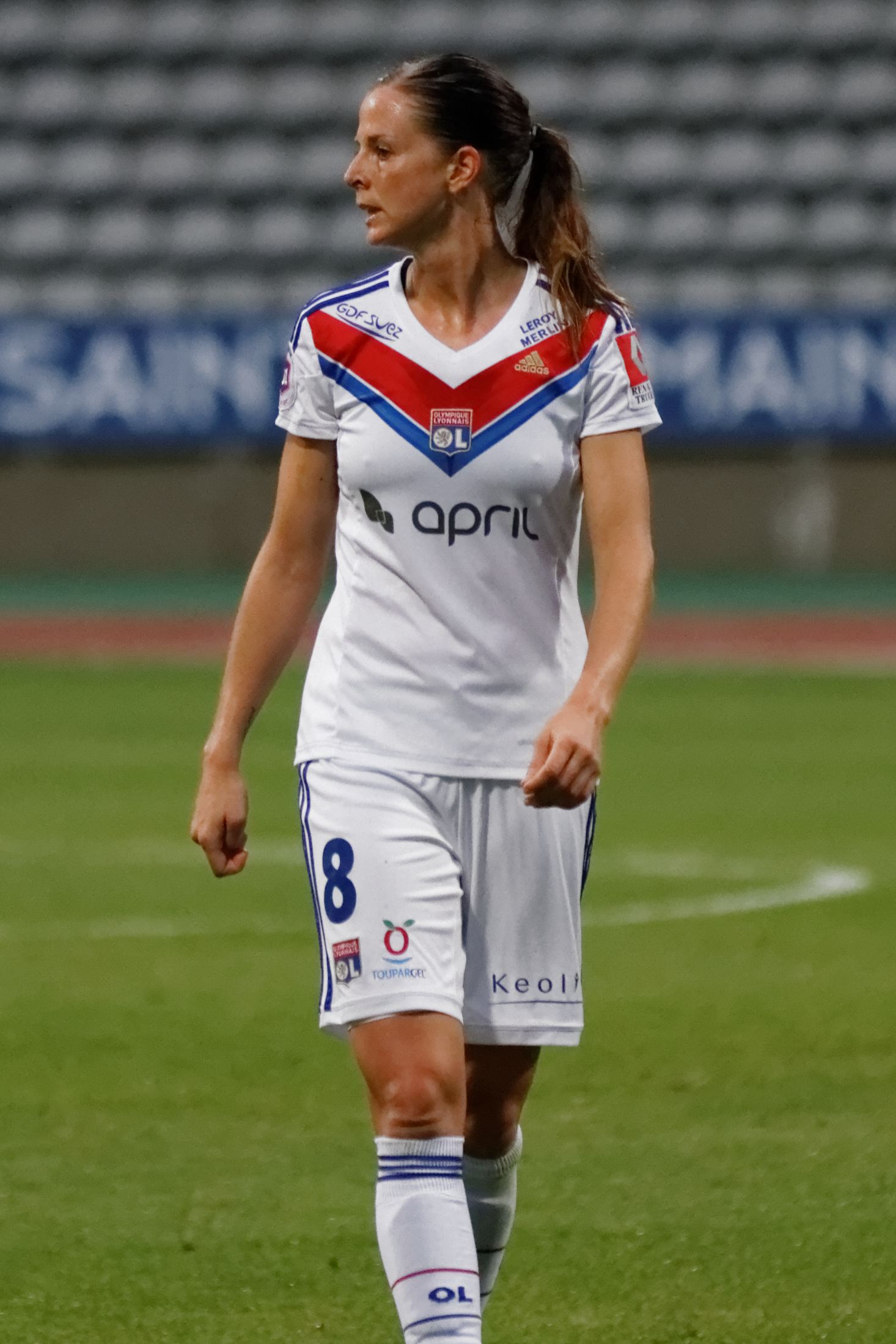
Playing for Lyon in 2013

After the re-branding and re-launch of the new United States-based league, Women's Professional Soccer (WPS), Schelin declared that she would be interested in playing in the league. However, after the 2008 Summer Olympics, Schelin announced that she would instead be joining Division 1 Féminine club Olympique Lyonnais in France. Upon signing her contract, it was reported by Göteborgs-Posten that Schelin would be earning over 1 million kr (US$160,000) per year. The move to France was criticised in Sweden, as, although Lyon were a well-resourced club, the overall standard of the Division 1 Féminine was considered much weaker than the Damallsvenskan. On 24 September 2008, Schelin's American transfer rights were drafted by the Saint Louis Athletica in the 2008 WPS International Draft. She declined the chance to join WPS, citing her contract with Lyon as the primary reason. Saint Louis signed Schelin's compatriot Sara Larsson instead.

Schelin arrived in Lyon in poor condition, after a thigh injury disrupted her 2008 spring season with Göteborg and migraines and stomach aches afflicted her at the 2008 Olympic Games. When she told Lyon's coach Farid Benstiti that she could also play on the wing, he shook his head and replied that he had signed her to score goals. Alongside Brazil's Kátia Cilene Teixeira, Schelin formed a productive attack for Lyon as the club defended its French title and reached the 2008–09 UEFA Women's Cup semi-final, where they lost to FCR 2001 Duisburg. The following season, Schelin was afflicted by injuries and was ruled out of Lyon's 2010 UEFA Women's Champions League Final defeat by Turbine Potsdam with ligament damage.

Schelin did play in the 2011 final, as Lyon avenged the previous year's defeat to beat Turbine Potsdam 2–0 at Craven Cottage and secure their first continental title. She had scored nine times on Lyon's route to the final, including twice in the semi-final, to bring about what she termed "the proudest moment" of her career. Lyon won a domestic double in 2011–12 and retained their European title by beating Frankfurt 2–0 in the 2012 final at the Olympic Stadium in Munich. In 2012–13 Schelin was in the best form of her career and finished as Division 1 Féminine top scorer with 24 goals in 16 appearances. She was also named French Player of the Year for the first time, but missed out on a third successive Champions League winner's medal when Lyon lost the final 1–0 to Wolfsburg at Stamford Bridge. In May 2013 she signed a new three-year contract with Lyon, reportedly worth an annual 2 million kr.

In 2013–14 Schelin contributed 12 league goals to another domestic double but Lyon lost to Turbine Potsdam in the Champions League round of 16. Her form had slumped after a breakdown in her working relationship with coach Patrice Lair. She rebounded the following season, scoring Lyon's 1000th Division 1 Féminine goal in a 7–0 home win over Rodez on 16 November 2014. Her second goal in the same match drew her level with Sandrine Brétigny as Lyon's all-time record scorer. She finished 2014–15 as Division 1 Féminine top scorer with 34 goals in 21 games, but Lyon were upset by French rivals Paris Saint-Germain in the Champions League round of 16.

Towards the end of another successful season in 2015–16, Lyon announced that Schelin would depart the club at the end of her contract. Her final game for the club was the 2016 UEFA Women's Champions League Final, in which she scored in the penalty shootout win over Wolfsburg. With Lyon Schelin won eight consecutive Division 1 Féminine titles, five Cups and three Champions Leagues. She left as the team's all-time record goalscorer with 225 goals in 225 appearances. Schelin's 41 goals for Lyon in the UEFA Women's Champions League left her fourth in the competition's all-time top scorer list. She held the record for Champions League goals for a single club, since Anja Mittag (49), Conny Pohlers (48) and Marta (46) all accrued their totals with more than one club.

=== Rosengård ===
On 8 June 2016, Schelin was presented as a player for Swedish champions FC Rosengård, of Malmö. She rejected an offer to rejoin Göteborg FC because they were unable to offer Champions League football. Schelin made her Rosengård debut slightly earlier than expected, substituting in for the injured Nataša Andonova after 22 minutes of a league fixture against Djurgården. Schelin scored a 90th-minute goal to salvage a 2–2 draw.

== International career ==
In March 2004 Schelin scored twice on her debut for the Swedish under-21 team, in their 6–0 win over the full Republic of Ireland national team in Dublin. She previously scored three goals in six appearances for Sweden's under-16 team and two goals in seven appearances for the under-18s.

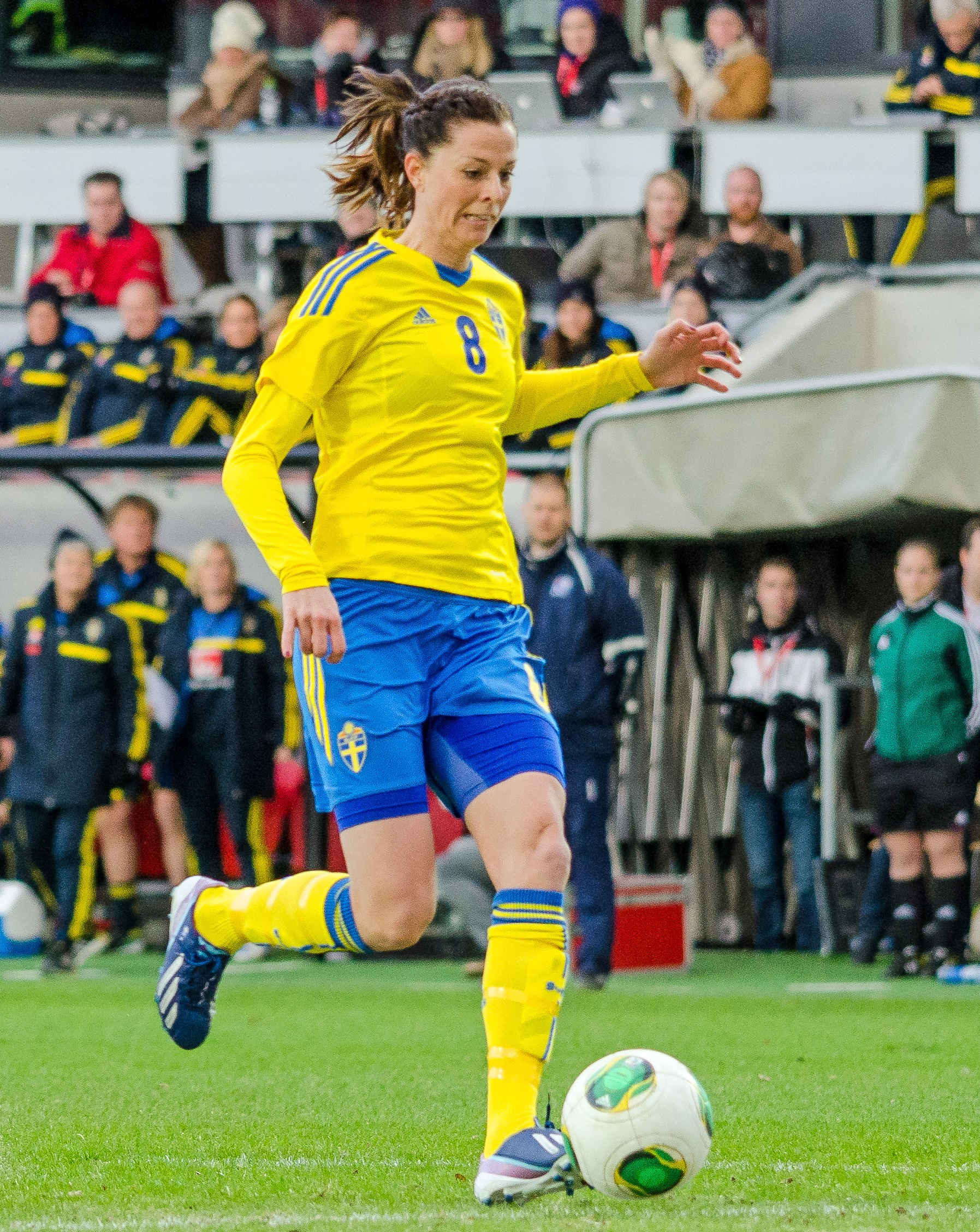
Schelin in April 2013

Schelin made her senior national team debut for Sweden on 16 March 2004; a 3–0 Algarve Cup defeat by France. In the fifth place play-off against China, Schelin was praised for scoring in Sweden's penalty shootout win after a 1–1 draw. She had been called into the squad as a replacement for Sara Johansson who had flu. Schelin retained her place and represented her nation at the 2004 Summer Olympics in Athens. Throughout this period, Schelin endured injuries to the groin and hamstring, which required extensive rest. She was selected by coach Marika Domanski-Lyfors for UEFA Women's Euro 2005 in North West England. She entered play as a second-half substitute but failed to score as Sweden lost 3–2 to rivals Norway in extra time of the semi-final in Warrington.

Schelin was a key player in the 2006 edition of the Algarve Cup; leading Sweden to their third-place finish. She scored the only goal in the bronze medal victory over France. After overcoming her injury problems, Schelin was awarded the Diamond Ball as the country's best female football player. That same year, she was named the Forward of the Year in the Damallsvenskan. Schelin's success brought her to mainstream attention in her country and she was rewarded with selection to attend the 2007 FIFA Women's World Cup draw in China on behalf of Sweden.

At the World Cup in China, Schelin scored two goals in three matches (one start) but Sweden unexpectedly failed to progress out of their group. After that failure some experienced players retired and coach Thomas Dennerby gave Schelin and other younger players a more prominent role in the team. Back in China the following year for the 2008 Beijing Olympics, she contributed three goals in four games but the Swedes lost 2–0 to Germany in the quarter-final.

Schelin helped Sweden to a bronze medal position at the 2011 FIFA Women's World Cup in Germany and was named in the All-Star Team. She featured in Sweden's 3–1 semi-final defeat to eventual winners Japan in Frankfurt. Sweden secured third place by beating France 2–1 in Sinsheim, Schelin scoring her second goal of the tournament. Third place also ensured Sweden's qualification for the 2012 Olympic football tournament in London. Dennerby kept Schelin in Sweden's Olympic squad for London, where they lost to France in the quarter-finals. Schelin scored twice in four matches but felt Dennerby's emphasis on defence had left her isolated in Sweden's attack.

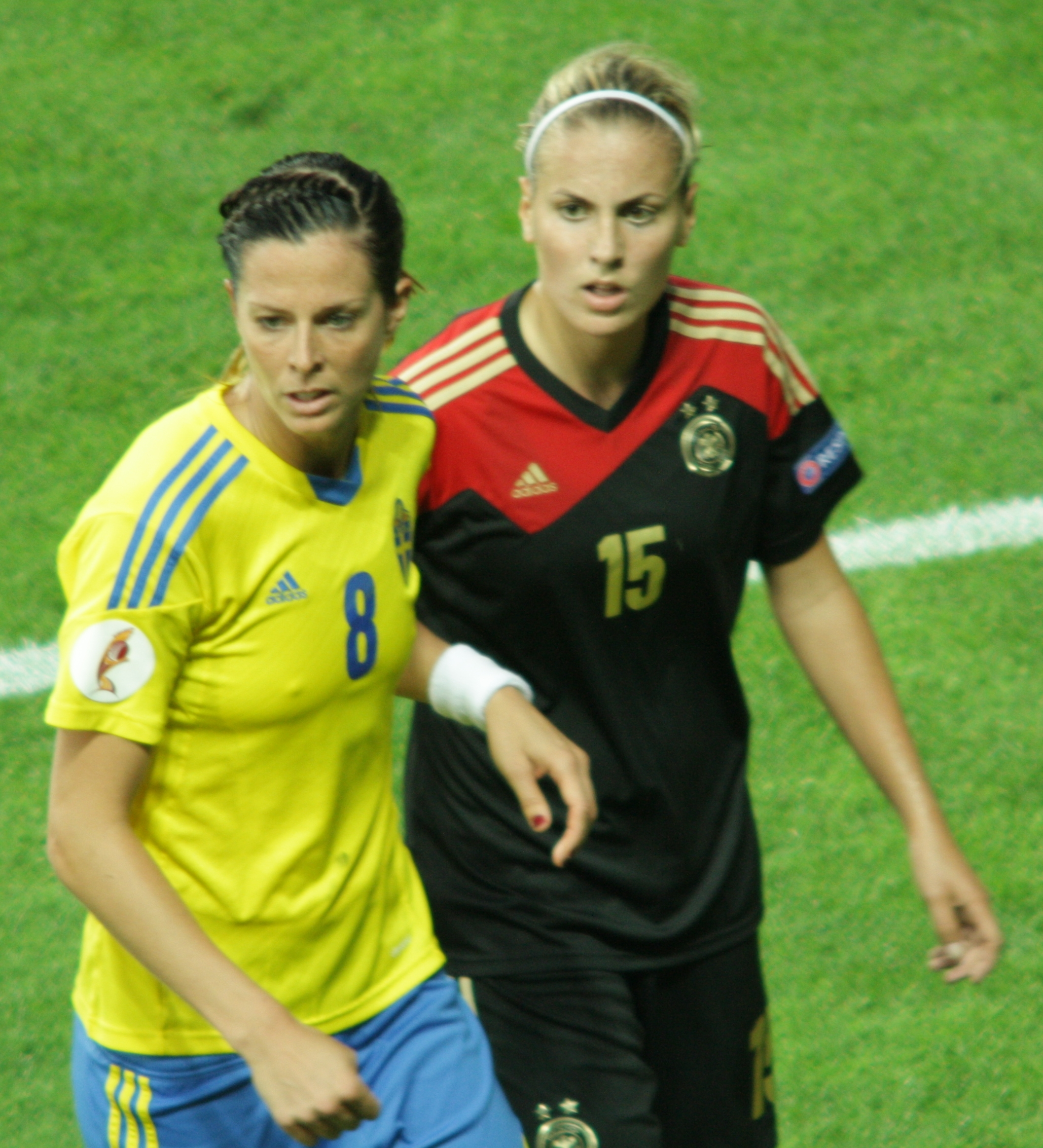
Marked by Germany's Jennifer Cramer in the Euro 2013 semi-final

In October 2012, new national team coach Pia Sundhage decided that Schelin and Caroline Seger would share the captaincy. Sundhage named Schelin in the squad for UEFA Women's Euro 2013, which Sweden hosted. Schelin finished as the tournament top scorer with five goals but was disappointed when Sweden lost 1–0 to Germany in the semi-final. She criticised the decision of Swiss referee Esther Staubli, who disallowed her equalising goal for a very questionable foul on Germany's centre-back Annike Krahn. Schelin's goal against Germany in October 2014's 2–1 home friendly defeat was her 73rd goal for Sweden, which broke the national record previously set by Hanna Ljungberg.

Schelin arrived at the 2015 FIFA Women's World Cup suffering from persistent knee pain. In Sweden's opening game she was unable to make any impression on Nigeria's defence, as the Africans recovered from 3–1 down to draw 3–3. In the team's 4–1 second round loss to Germany, goalkeeper Hedvig Lindahl made several saves to prevent an even heavier defeat for the disorganised Swedes.

With 165 caps and 84 goals, Schelin was the most experienced member of Sweden's 18-player squad for the 2016 Summer Olympics. When the team suffered a record 5–1 defeat by hosts Brazil in the second match, Schelin scored the late consolation goal and tried to lift the spirits of her demoralised teammates. In the quarter-final against the United States, captain Schelin had an extra-time goal incorrectly ruled out for offside and the match finished 1–1. She scored in Sweden's penalty shootout win. Sweden reached the gold medal match, but lost 2–1 to Germany. Schelin was disappointed by the defeat but proud to win a silver medal.

== Style of play ==
In June 2015 Schelin described herself as "not a typical center-forward" as she likes to drop deep or go wide in order to find space: "I always think of the collective because the danger can come from all players. Even if I do not score, I pass, I run to attract defenders. In the end, I want to win." She attributes her unselfish play to her upbringing in communal Swedish culture. After moving to Lyon, her instinct to pass to better-placed teammates annoyed her coach Farid Benstiti, who wanted her to concentrate on converting chances herself. Sweden's former coach Thomas Dennerby felt that Schelin became more comfortable on the ball after moving to Lyon, but retained her pace and ability in one-on-one situations.

Schelin is capable of playing as a winger. But when Dennerby deployed her wide in the 2007 FIFA Women's World Cup, her Göteborg coach Martin Pringle called for her to be given a more central role: "she is too good a player to play out there". China's coach Shang Ruihua highlighted Schelin as Sweden's best player ahead of the countries' opening match at the 2008 Summer Olympics: "Schelin has fast pace and excellent technique, and few defenders could keep up with her." Although tall and slender, she is also physically strong; England captain Steph Houghton rated Schelin as the "toughest opponent" of her career.

The comparisons are nice in a way. After all, Zlatan's one of the best in the world; a real killer on the field with fantastic technical skills and an awesome will to win. But although he inspires me, and I love watching him play, there are big differences between us too. And I like that young girls look up to me as Lotta Schelin, not as 'the female Zlatan'.

— Lotta Schelin

As a tall, skilful and prolific Swedish forward, Schelin has frequently drawn comparison with the contemporary male footballer Zlatan Ibrahimović. Former Denmark national team manager Peter Bonde branded Schelin "the female Zlatan" in 2005. In December 2013, Ibrahimović made an outspoken rejection of any comparison: "I was asked [by Swedish media] in the summer who was the better player, me or Lotta Schelin. You're kidding me, right? When I've broken all these records, this goal record, the goals in the national team, who shall I compare it to? Shall I compare it to whoever has the record, or the ladies?" Schelin's national team coach Pia Sundhage described his comments as sad and boring. Johanna Frändén, a journalist specialising in coverage of Ibrahimović, noted Schelin's contrasting temperament: "She is polite, charming, she does not have the same arrogance".

== Personal life ==
Schelin came out publicly as a lesbian in August 2018. She has been married to her wife Rebecca since 2018.

== In popular culture ==
Schelin featured in the Sveriges Television documentary television series The Other Sport from 2013.

In 2021 Schelin participated in the Swedish version of the South Korean game show Masked Singer as Jokern (The Joker).

== Career statistics ==
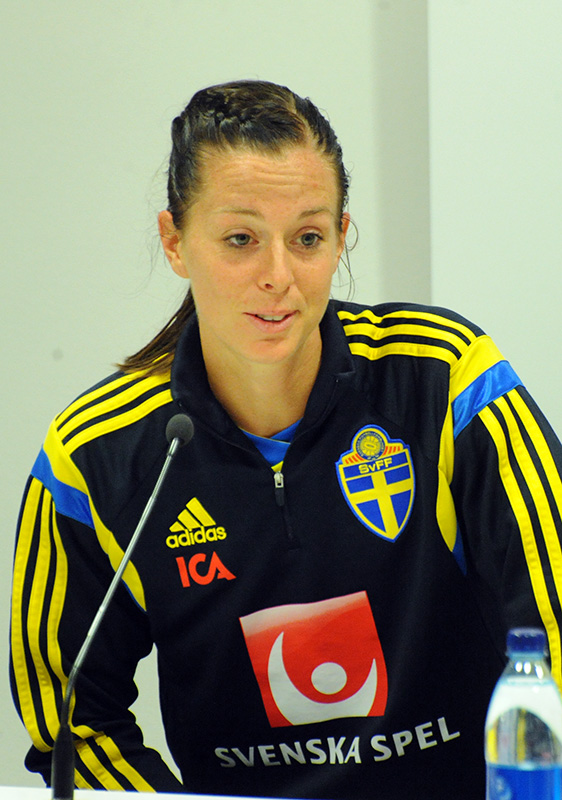
Schelin in 2014

=== Club ===
Appearances and goals by club, season and competition
Club	Season	League		Cup		Continental		Total	
Club	Season	Apps	Goals	Apps	Goals	Apps	Goals	Apps	Goals
Göteborg	2001	19	8	0	0	0	0	19	8
Göteborg	2002	8	3	0	0	0	0	8	3
Göteborg	2003	11	10	2	2	0	0	13	12
Göteborg	2004	15	14	1	0	0	0	16	14
Göteborg	2005	22	10	2	2	0	0	24	12
Göteborg	2006	21	21	4	8	0	0	25	29
Göteborg	2007	22	26	2	1	0	0	24	27
Göteborg	2008	5	0	0	0	0	0	5	0
Göteborg	Total	123	92	11	13	0	0	134	105
Lyon	2008–09	16	17	3	1	7	7	26	25
Lyon	2009–10	11	11	1	0	7	5	19	16
Lyon	2010–11	18	11	4	2	9	9	31	22
Lyon	2011–12	20	20	6	13	9	5	35	38
Lyon	2012–13	16	24	5	7	6	7	27	38
Lyon	2013–14	18	12	4	9	4	2	26	23
Lyon	2014–15	21	34	6	5	4	2	31	41
Lyon	2015–16	18	14	5	4	7	4	30	22
Lyon	Total	138	143	34	41	53	41	225	225
Rosengård	2015	0	0	1	1	0	0	1	1
Rosengård	2016	6	5	3	3	0	0	9	8
Rosengård	2017	11	5	0	0	0	0	11	5
Rosengård	Total	17	10	4	4	0	0	21	14
Career total		278	245	49	58	53	41	380	344

=== International ===
Scores and results list Sweden's goal tally first, score column indicates score after each Schelin goal.

List of international goals scored by Lotta Schelin
No.	Date	Venue	Opponent	Score	Result	Competition	Ref.
1	28 August 2005	Nobelstadion, Karlskoga, Sweden	Iceland	2–1	2–2	2007 FIFA Women's World Cup qualification	
2	24 September 2005	Norrvalla, Skellefteå, Sweden	Belarus	3–0	6–0	2007 FIFA Women's World Cup qualification	
3	15 March 2006	Estádio Algarve, Faro, Portugal	France	1–0	1–0	2006 Algarve Cup	
4	22 April 2006	Stadion Františka Kloze, Kladno, Czech Republic	Czech Republic	2–1	3–2	2007 FIFA Women's World Cup qualification	
5	22 April 2006	Stadion Františka Kloze, Kladno, Czech Republic	Czech Republic	3–2	3–2	2007 FIFA Women's World Cup qualification	
6	7 May 2006	Vångavallen, Trelleborg, Sweden	Portugal	2–1	5–1	2007 FIFA Women's World Cup qualification	
7	18 June 2006	Darida Stadium, Minsk, Belarus	Belarus	1–0	6–0	2007 FIFA Women's World Cup qualification	
8	12 February 2007	GSZ Stadium, Larnaca, Cyprus	Japan	1–0	2–2	Friendly	
9	16 June 2007	Stadionul Mogoșoaia, Mogoșoaia, Romania	Romania	7–0	7–0	UEFA Women's Euro 2009 qualifying	
10	18 September 2007	Tianjin Olympic Center Stadium, Tianjin, China	North Korea	1–0	2–1	2007 FIFA Women's World Cup	
11	18 September 2007	Tianjin Olympic Center Stadium, Tianjin, China	North Korea	2–1	2–1	2007 FIFA Women's World Cup	
12	8 November 2007	Energi Viborg Arena, Viborg, Denmark	Denmark	2–1	4–2	2008 Summer Olympics qualification	
13	8 November 2007	Energi Viborg Arena, Viborg, Denmark	Denmark	4–1	4–2	2008 Summer Olympics qualification	
14	28 November 2007	Råsundastadion, Solna, Sweden	Denmark	1–0	3–1	2008 Summer Olympics qualification	
15	12 February 2008	Dasaki Stadium, Dasaki Achnas, Cyprus	England	1–0	2–0	Friendly	
16	12 February 2008	Dasaki Stadium, Dasaki Achnas, Cyprus	England	2–0	2–0	Friendly	
17	16 February 2008	Paralimni Stadium, Paralimni, Cyprus	Norway	1–0	2–0	Friendly	
18	25 June 2008	Carlisle Grounds, Bray, Ireland	Republic of Ireland	5–0	5–0	UEFA Women's Euro 2009 qualifying	
19	20 July 2008	Komplett Arena, Sandefjord, Norway	Norway	1–0	2–0	Friendly	
20	6 August 2008	Tianjin Olympic Center Stadium, Tianjin, China	China	1–1	1–2	2008 Summer Olympics	
21	12 August 2008	Beijing Workers' Stadium, Beijing, China	Canada	1–0	2–1	2008 Summer Olympics	
22	12 August 2008	Beijing Workers' Stadium, Beijing, China	Canada	2–0	2–1	2008 Summer Olympics	
23	31 January 2009	Marbella Football Centre, Marbella, Spain	Norway	1–0	5–1	Friendly	
24	31 January 2009	Marbella Football Centre, Marbella, Spain	Norway	3–0	5–1	Friendly	
25	31 January 2009	Marbella Football Centre, Marbella, Spain	Norway	4–0	5–1	Friendly	
26	31 January 2009	Marbella Football Centre, Marbella, Spain	Norway	5–1	5–1	Friendly	
27	9 March 2009	Estádio Algarve, Faro, Portugal	Germany	2–0	3–2	2009 Algarve Cup	
28	9 March 2009	Estádio Algarve, Faro, Portugal	Germany	3–0	3–2	2009 Algarve Cup	
29	11 March 2009	Estádio Algarve, Faro, Portugal	United States	1–0	1–1 (4–3	2009 Algarve Cup p)	
30	25 April 2009	Gamla Ullevi, Gothenburg, Sweden	Brazil	3–1	3–1	Friendly	
31	28 August 2009	Veritas Stadion, Turku, Finland	Italy	1–0	2–0	UEFA Women's Euro 2009	
32	25 August 2010	Värendsvallen, Växjö, Sweden	Wales	1–0	5–1	2011 FIFA Women's World Cup qualification	
33	25 August 2010	Värendsvallen, Växjö, Sweden	Wales	4–0	5–1	2011 FIFA Women's World Cup qualification	
34	11 September 2010	Gamla Ullevi, Gothenburg, Sweden	Denmark	2–0	2–1	2011 FIFA Women's World Cup qualification - UEFA play-offs	
35	26 October 2010	Falkenbergs IP, Falkenberg, Sweden	Norway	2–0	3–1	Friendly	
36	26 October 2010	Falkenbergs IP, Falkenberg, Sweden	Norway	3–1	3–1	Friendly	
37	7 March 2011	Estádio José Arcanjo, Olhão, Portugal	China	1–0	1–0	2011 Algarve Cup	
38	16 June 2011	Gamla Ullevi, Gothenburg, Sweden	Mexico	2–0	2–0	Friendly	
39	10 July 2011	Impuls Arena, Augsburg, Germany	Australia	3–1	3–1	2011 FIFA Women's World Cup	
40	16 July 2011	Rhein-Neckar-Arena, Sinsheim, Germany	France	1–0	2–1	2011 FIFA Women's World Cup	
41	2 March 2012	Desportivo da Nora Park, Ferreiras, Portugal	Iceland	1–0	4–1	2012 Algarve Cup	
42	31 March 2012	Malmö Stadion, Malmö, Sweden	Canada	2–0	3–1	Friendly	
43	26 May 2012	Stark's Park, Kirkcaldy, Scotland	Scotland	1–0	4–1	Friendly	
44	26 May 2012	Stark's Park, Kirkcaldy, Scotland	Scotland	2–0	4–1	Friendly	
45	16 June 2012	Örjans Vall, Halmstad, Sweden	United States	1–2	1–3	2012 Sweden Invitational	
46	25 July 2012	City of Coventry Stadium, Coventry, England	South Africa	3–0	4–1	2012 Summer Olympics	
47	25 July 2012	City of Coventry Stadium, Coventry, England	South Africa	4–1	4–1	2012 Summer Olympics	
48	15 September 2012	Gamla Ullevi, Gothenburg, Sweden	Netherlands	1–1	2–1	Friendly	
49	8 March 2013	Municipal Stadium, Albufeira, Portugal	Iceland	3–0	6–1	2013 Algarve Cup	
50	6 April 2013	Myresjöhus Arena, Växjö, Sweden	Iceland	1–0	2–0	Friendly	
51	6 April 2013	Myresjöhus Arena, Växjö, Sweden	Iceland	2–0	2–0	Friendly	
52	1 June 2013	Linköping Arena, Linköping, Sweden	Norway	1–1	2–1	Friendly	
53	4 July 2013	Skarsjövallen, Ljungskile, Sweden	England	2–1	4–1	Friendly	
54	4 July 2013	Skarsjövallen, Ljungskile, Sweden	England	4–1	4–1	Friendly	
55	13 July 2013	Gamla Ullevi, Gothenburg, Sweden	Finland	4–0	5–0	UEFA Women's Euro 2013	
56	13 July 2013	Gamla Ullevi, Gothenburg, Sweden	Finland	5–0	5–0	UEFA Women's Euro 2013	
57	16 July 2013	Örjans Vall, Halmstad, Sweden	Italy	2–0	3–1	UEFA Women's Euro 2013	
58	21 July 2013	Örjans Vall, Halmstad, Sweden	Iceland	3–0	4–0	UEFA Women's Euro 2013	
59	21 July 2013	Örjans Vall, Halmstad, Sweden	Iceland	4–0	4–0	UEFA Women's Euro 2013	
60	21 September 2013	Swedbank Stadion, Malmö, Sweden	Poland	1–0	2–0	2015 FIFA Women's World Cup qualification	
61	26 October 2013	Bilino Polje, Zenica, Bosnia & Herzegovina	Bosnia and Herzegovina	1–0	1–0	2015 FIFA Women's World Cup qualification	
62	31 October 2013	Gamla Ullevi, Gothenburg, Sweden	Faroe Islands	1–0	5–0	2015 FIFA Women's World Cup qualification	
63	31 October 2013	Gamla Ullevi, Gothenburg, Sweden	Faroe Islands	4–0	5–0	2015 FIFA Women's World Cup qualification	
64	7 March 2014	Estádio Municipal, Albufeira, Portugal	United States	1–0	1–0	2014 Algarve Cup	
65	5 April 2014	Shamrock Park, Portadown, Northern Ireland	Northern Ireland	2–0	4–0	2015 FIFA Women's World Cup qualification	
66	19 June 2014	Tórsvøllur, Tórshavn, Faroe Islands	Faroe Islands	3–0	5–0	2015 FIFA Women's World Cup qualification	
67	19 June 2014	Tórsvøllur, Tórshavn, Faroe Islands	Faroe Islands	4–0	5–0	2015 FIFA Women's World Cup qualification	
68	21 August 2014	Stadion Kazimierza Deyny, Starogard Gdański, Poland	Poland	1–0	4–0	2015 FIFA Women's World Cup qualification	
69	21 August 2014	Stadion Kazimierza Deyny, Starogard Gdański, Poland	Poland	3–0	4–0	2015 FIFA Women's World Cup qualification	
70	13 September 2014	Gamla Ullevi, Gothenburg, Sweden	Bosnia and Herzegovina	2–0	3–0	2015 FIFA Women's World Cup qualification	
71	13 September 2014	Gamla Ullevi, Gothenburg, Sweden	Bosnia and Herzegovina	3–0	3–0	2015 FIFA Women's World Cup qualification	
72	17 September 2014	Gamla Ullevi, Gothenburg, Sweden	Scotland	2–0	2–0	2015 FIFA Women's World Cup qualification	
73	29 October 2014	Behrn Arena, Örebro, Sweden	Germany	1–0	1–2	Friendly	
74	13 January 2015	La Manga, Spain	Norway	3–2	3–2	Friendly	
75	12 February 2015	Eerikkilä Areena, Tammela, Finland	Finland	1–0	3–0	Friendly	
76	9 March 2015	Estádio Municipal, Vila Real de Santo António, Portugal	China	2–0	3–0	2015 Algarve Cup	
77	5 April 2015	Tunavallen, Eskilstuna, Sweden	Switzerland	1–2	1–3	Friendly	
78	8 April 2015	Tele2 Arena, Stockholm, Sweden	Denmark	1–0	3–3	Friendly	
79	8 April 2015	Tele2 Arena, Stockholm, Sweden	Denmark	2–2	3–3	Friendly	
80	30 May 2015	York Stadium, Toronto, Canada	Netherlands	1–1	2–1	Friendly	
81	17 September 2015	CSR Orhei, Orhei, Moldova	Moldova	2–0	3–0	UEFA Women's Euro 2017 qualifying	
82	26 January 2016	Prioritet Serneke Arena, Gothenburg, Sweden	Scotland	4–0	6–0	Friendly	
83	2 June 2016	Stadion ŁKS, Łódź, Poland	Poland	2–0	4–0	UEFA Women's Euro 2017 qualifying	
84	21 July 2016	Guldfågeln Arena, Kalmar, Sweden	Japan	1–0	3–0	Friendly	
85	6 August 2016	Estádio Olímpico João Havelange, Rio de Janeiro, Brazil	Brazil	1–5	1–5	2016 Summer Olympics	
86	1 March 2017	Albufeira Municipal Stadium, Albufeira, Portugal	Australia	1–0	1–0	2017 Algarve Cup	
87	21 July 2017	De Adelaarshorst, Deventer, Netherlands	Russia	1–0	2–0	UEFA Women's Euro 2017	
88	25 July 2017	De Vijverberg, Doetinchem, Netherlands	Italy	1–1	2–3	UEFA Women's Euro 2017	

== Honours ==
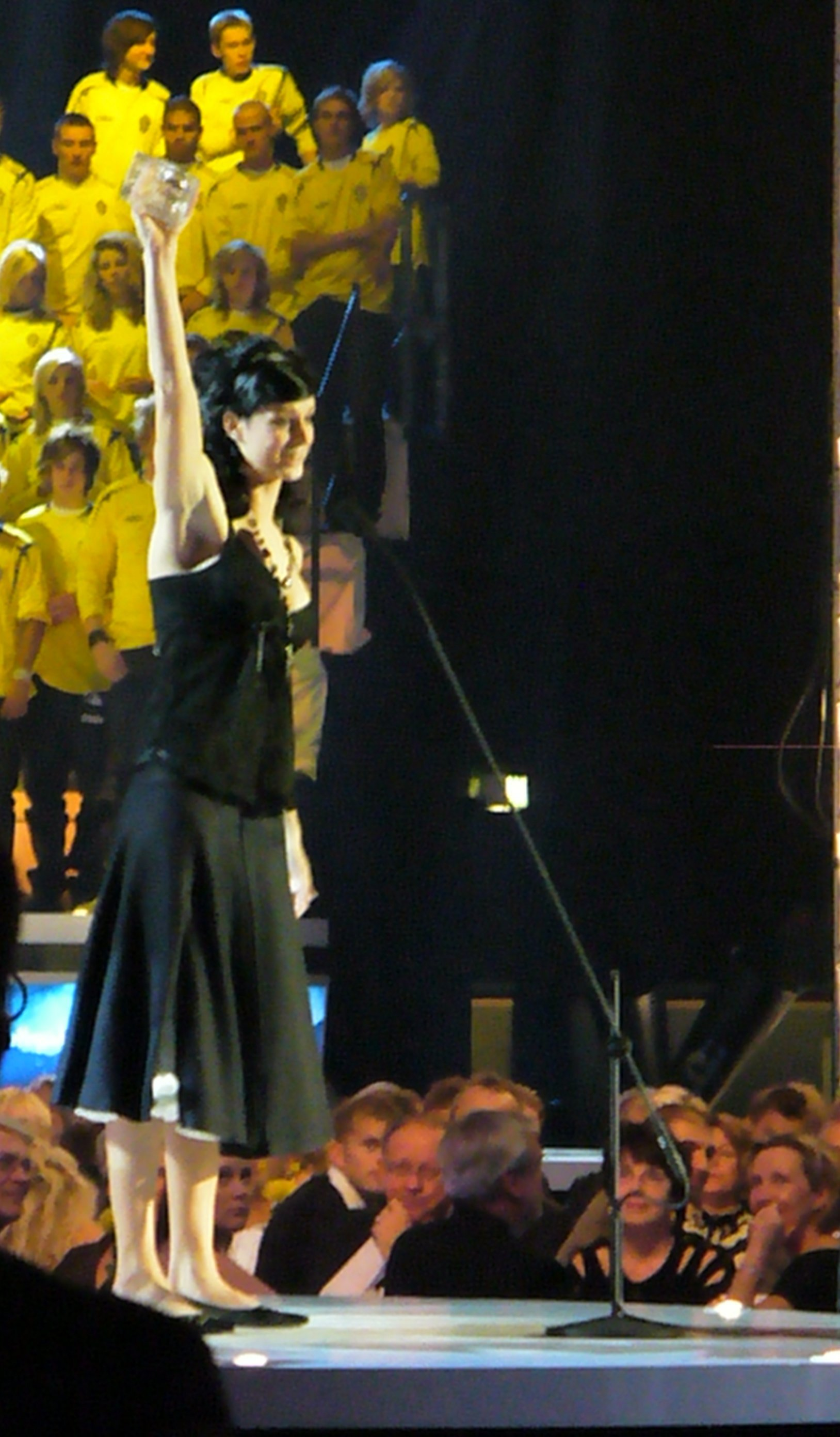
Receiving Diamantbollen in November 2006

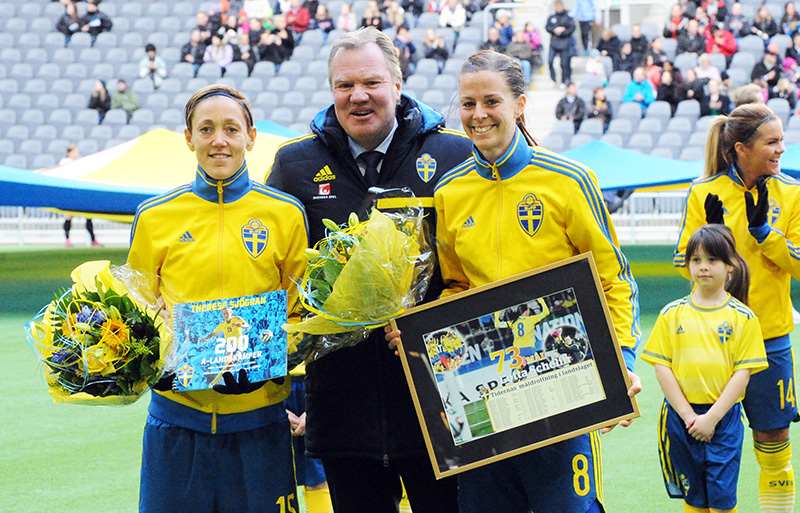
Schelin (right) receiving an award from SvFF President Karl-Erik Nilsson in April 2015, for breaking Sweden's international scoring record. Therese Sjögran (left) got an award for her 200 caps.

Lyon

- Division 1 Féminine: 2008–09, 2009–10, 2010–11, 2011–12, 2012–13, 2013–14, 2014–15, 2015–16
- Coupe de France Féminine: 2011–12, 2012–13, 2013–14, 2014–15, 2015–16
- UEFA Women's Champions League: 2010–11, 2011–12, 2015–16
- International Women's Club Championship: 2012
- Valais Women's Cup: 2014

FC Rosengård

- Svenska Cupen: 2016

Sweden

- FIFA Women's World Cup third place: 2011
- Olympics runner-up: 2016
- Algarve Cup: 2009

Sweden U17

- Nordic Cup runner-up: 2001

Individual

- UEFA Best Women's Player in Europe Award third place: 2013
- UEFA Women's Euro Golden Boot: 2013
- FIFA Women's World Cup All Star Team: 2011
- UEFA Women's Euro All Star Team: 2013
- Best player in France: 2013
- Diamantbollen: 2006, 2011, 2012, 2013, 2014
- Swedish Breakthrough Player of the Year: 2004
- Division 1 Féminine top scorer: 2013, 2015
- Damallsvenskan top scorer: 2006, 2007
- Swedish Forward of the Year: 2006, 2011, 2013, 2014
- Kopparbergs/Göteborg FC MVP: 2006
