= 2012 International Women's Club Championship =

mobcast cup International Women's Club Championship 2012
mobcast cup 国際女子サッカークラブ選手権2012

Tournament details
- Host country: Japan
- Dates: 22–25 November
- Teams: 4
- Venue: 2 (in 1 host city)

Final positions
- Champions: Olympique Lyonnais (1st title)
- Runners-up: INAC Kobe Leonessa
- Third place: NTV Beleza
- Fourth place: Canberra United

Tournament statistics
- Matches played: 4
- Goals scored: 21 (5.25 per match)
- Attendance: 10,232 (2,558 per match)
- Top scorer(s): Azusa Iwashimizu; Asano Nagasato; Lara Dickenmann; Beverly Goebel-Yanez (2 goals)

The 2012 International Women's Club Championship was the first worldwide international women's football club tournament, and was held in Japan from November 22–25, 2012. Four teams, comprising representatives from Europe, Australia and Japan, took part in the competition.

== Organization ==
The tournament was hosted by Japan Football Association and Japan Women's Football league. Fuji Television and BS Fuji affiliated, and Sankei Shimbun, Sankei Sports, FM NACK5, city of Saitama and Saitama Sports Commission supported the competition. Several companies such as Peugeot Citroën Japon, ASICS, Calbee and Nikon sponsored with the main sponsor Mobcast.

== Participating teams ==
- The participants were the champions of Europe, Australia, Japan and Japanese league cup.

Team	Tournament won	Confederation or FA
(France) Olympique Lyonnais	2011–12 UEFA Women's Champions League	UEFA (Europe)
(Australia) Canberra United FC	2011–12 W-League	Football Federation Australia
(Japan) INAC Kobe Leonessa	2012 Nadeshiko League	Japan Football Association
(Japan) NTV Beleza	2012 Nadeshiko League Cup	Japan Football Association

== Venues ==
Two venues for the competition and both are in Saitama.

Saitama
Urawa Komaba Stadium	NACK5 Stadium Omiya
Capacity: 21,500	Capacity: 15,500

== Results ==
=== Tournament map ===
Semi-finals
22 November — Urawa
(France) Olympique Lyonnais	5
(Japan) NTV Beleza	2
22 November — Urawa
(Japan) INAC Kobe	4
(Australia) Canberra United FC	0

Final
25 November — Omiya
(Japan) INAC Kobe	1
(France) Olympique Lyonnais (a.e.t.)	2
Third place
25 November — Omiya
(Japan) NTV Beleza	4
(Australia) Canberra United FC	3

=== Semi-finals ===
22 November 2012
16:30

Olympique Lyonnais (France)	5–2	(Japan) NTV Beleza
Own 4'; Lara Dickenmann 6'; Louisa Nécib 23'; Lara Dickenmann 58'; Lotta Schelin 60'	Report	Nanase Kiryu 55'; Asano Nagasato 89'

Urawa Komaba Stadium, Saitama
Attendance: 1,293
Referee: Sook Hee KIM (South Korea)

22 November 2012
19:20

INAC Kobe Leonessa (Japan)	4–0	(Australia) Canberra United FC
Beverly Goebel-Yanez 17'; Megumi Takase 35'; Shinobu Ohno 54'; Beverly Goebel-Yanez 82'	Report

Urawa Komaba Stadium, Saitama
Attendance: 2,027
Referee: Pannipar Kamnueng (Thailand)

=== Third place play-off ===
25 November 2012
13:30

Canberra United FC (Australia)	3–4	(Japan) NTV Beleza
Jennifer Bisset 7'; Michelle Heyman 33'; Hayley Raso 66'	Report	Azusa Iwashimizu 11'; Kanako Ito 42'; Asano Nagasato 78'; Azusa Iwashimizu 90+2'

NACK5 Stadium Omiya, Saitama
Attendance: 2,711
Referee: Pannipar Kamnueng (Thailand)

=== Final ===
25 November 2012
17:20

INAC Kobe Leonessa (Japan)	1–2 (a.e.t.)	(France) Olympique Lyonnais
Ji So-Yun 39'	Report	Corine Franco 80'; Sonia Bompastor 103'

NACK5 Stadium Omiya, Saitama
Attendance: 4,201
Referee: Sook Hee KIM (South Korea)

INAC Kobe Leonessa	Olympique Lyonnais

GK	1	(Japan) Ayumi Kaihori	(yellow card) 67'
DF	2	(Japan) Yukari Kinga
DF	5	(Japan) Junko Kai	(yellow card) 102'
DF	4	(Japan) Asuna Tanaka
DF	22	(United States) Becky		(substituted off) 74'
MF	8	(Japan) Homare Sawa
MF	10	(Japan) Shinobu Ohno (c)
MF	7	(South Korea) Ji So-Yun	(yellow card) 60'	(substituted off) 105'
FW	9	(Japan) Nahomi Kawasumi
FW	21	(United States) Beverly Goebel-Yanez		(substituted off) 105'
FW	11	(Japan) Megumi Takase
Substitutes:
DF	3	(Japan) Ryoko Takara		(substituted in) 74'
MF	6	(Japan) Chiaki Minamiyama		(substituted in) 105'
FW	19	(Japan) Emi Nakajima		(substituted in) 105'
Manager:
Kei Hoshikawa

GK	30	(France) Sarah Bouhaddi
DF	5	(France) Laura Georges
DF	3	(France) Wendie Renard
DF	11	(France) Laura Agard		(substituted off) 51'
DF	18	(France) Sonia Bompastor (c)
MF	6	(France) Amandine Henry		(substituted off) 61'
MF	10	(France) Louisa Necib		(substituted off) 106'
MF	23	(France) Camille Abily
FW	12	(France) Élodie Thomis
FW	8	(Sweden) Lotta Schelin
MF	9	(France) Eugénie Le Sommer		(substituted off) 45'
Substitutes:
FW	21	(Switzerland) Lara Dickenmann	(yellow card) 90+3'	(substituted in) 45'
DF	17	(France) Corine Franco		(substituted in) 51'
FW	24	(France) Laëtitia Tonazzi		(substituted in) 61'
MF	15	(France) Elise Bussaglia		(substituted in) 106'
Manager:
Patrice Lair

MATCH OFFICIALS

- Assistant referees:
  - Shiho Ayukai (Japan)
  - Naomi Nakano (Japan)
- Fourth official: Sachiko Yamagishi (Japan)

== Awards ==
Prize	Player	Club
Most Valuable Player	(France) Corine Franco	(France) Lyon
Most Impressive Player	(South Korea) Ji So-Yun	(Japan) Kobe

== Goal scorers ==
2 goals

- (Japan) Azusa Iwashimizu
- (Japan) Asano Nagasato
- (Switzerland) Lara Dickenmann
- (United States) Beverly Goebel-Yanez

1 goal

- (Australia) Jennifer Bisset
- (Australia) Michelle Heyman
- (Australia) Hayley Raso
- (France) Sonia Bompastor
- (France) Corine Franco
- (France) Louisa Nécib
- (Japan) Kanako Ito
- (Japan) Nanase Kiryu
- (Japan) Shinobu Ohno
- (Japan) Megumi Takase
- (South Korea) Ji So-Yun
- (Sweden) Lotta Schelin

=== Own goals ===
1 goal

- (Japan) Saori Ariyoshi

== Referees ==
- (Thailand) Pannipar Kamnueng
- (South Korea) Sook-Hee Kim

Assistants:

- (Japan) Rikako Arakawa
- (Japan) Kumi Sunaga
- (Japan) Hisae Yoshizawa
- (Japan) Makoto Bozono
- (Japan) Chie Ohata
- (Japan) Mayumi Yonemura
- (Japan) Shiho Ayukai
- (Japan) Naomi Makino

Fourth:

- (Japan) Etsuko Fukano
- (Japan) Sachiko Yamagishi

== Prize-pool ==
The total prize-pool was 100,000$:

- 1st 60,000$
- 2nd 30,000$
- 3rd 10,000$
