= Flavie Lemaître =

French footballer (born 1988)

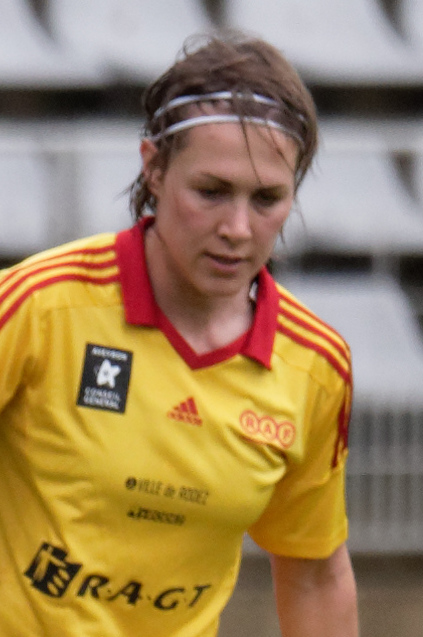

Personal information
- Date of birth: 2 October 1988 (age 38)
- Place of birth: Tours, France
- Height: 1.69 m (5 ft 7 in)
- Position: Forward

Senior career*
Years	Team	Apps	(Gls)
- Toulouse
- * Club domestic league appearances and goals

Flavie Lemaître (born 2 October 1988) is a French footballer who plays as a striker who played Toulouse.
