= Sarah Palacin =

French footballer (born 1988)

Personal information
- Date of birth: 2 November 1988 (age 38)
- Place of birth: Longjumeau, France
- Height: 1.60 m (5 ft 3 in)
- Position: Forward

Team information
- Current team: Nice

Youth career
- 1997–2003: ES Plessis-Pâté
- 2003–2008: Val d'Orge

Senior career*
Years	Team	Apps	(Gls)
2008–2011	FF Issy	59	(41)
2011–2016	Saint-Étienne	102	(37)
2016–2017	Paris Saint-Germain	6	(1)
2017–2019	FC Fleury 91	31	(3)
2019–2020	Marseille	9	(1)
2020–	OGC Nice	28	(24)

International career^{‡}
2015–2016	France U23	2	(0)
- * Club domestic league appearances and goals as of 16:01, 17 October 2022 (UTC) ‡ National team caps and goals as of 19:30, 11 March 2021 (UTC)

Sarah Palacin (born 2 November 1988) is a French footballer who plays for Division 2 Féminine club Nice Féminine. She has previously played for Val d'Orge, FF Issy, Saint-Étienne, Paris Saint-Germain, FC Fleury 91, and Olympique de Marseille. Between 2015 and 2016, she made two appearances for the France under-23s team.

== Club career ==
Palacin started playing football aged nine in Le Plessis-Pâté. She played for four years at Val d'Orge, before moving to FF Issy, where she played from 2008 until 2011. In that time, FF Issy were promoted from Division 3 Féminine to Division 2 Féminine. Between 2011 and 2016, Palacin played for Division 1 Féminine club Saint-Étienne. She scored 15 goals for Saint-Étienne in the 2014–15 season, making her the team's top scorer. She scored a hat-trick in a February 2015 match against FF Issy. In the 2015–16 season, she scored eight goals.

In 2016, Palacin signed for Paris Saint-Germain Féminine. She signed a one-year contract, with an option of another year. In April 2017, she fractured her fibula, which ruled her out for the remainder of the season. In June 2017, she signed for FC Fleury 91 (formerly Val d'Orge). In 2019, she signed for Olympique de Marseille, and in 2020, she signed for Nice Féminine.

== International career ==
Palacin has made two appearances for the France-under 23 team, in 2015 and 2016 matches against Poland B.

== Personal life ==
Palacin is from Longjumeau, a suburb of Paris. Whilst at Saint-Étienne, she also worked for Eovi Mcd mutuelle. Her father was a footballer in Le Plessis-Pâté.
