= International Women's Club Championship =

- Organiser(s): Japan Football Association; Nadeshiko League
- Founded: 2012
- Abolished: 2014
- Region: International
- Teams: 4–6
- Last champions: (Brazil) São José (1st title)
- Most championships: (France) Olympique Lyonnais (Japan) INAC Kobe Leonessa (Brazil) São José (1 title each)
- Website: iwcchampionship.com (in Japanese)

The International Women's Club Championship (IWCC), previously named the mobcast Cup and the Nestlé Cup for sponsorship reasons, was an invitational association football tournament contested by women's clubs. It was organised by the Japan Football Association and the Nadeshiko League. The first IWCC took place in Japan in November 2012 with participation from four teams: Olympique Lyonnais (Europe), Canberra United (Australia), INAC Kobe Leonessa (Japan) and NTV Beleza (cup winner, Japan).

The tournament billed itself as a world championship and frequently invited domestic and continental champions from around the world. The Nadeshiko League's senior executive announced in October 2012 that they intended to run the competition for three years and expand to include more champions, such as the South American Copa Libertadores winner. It was envisaged that FIFA, the sport's global governing body, would ultimately endorse the tournament as the female equivalent of the FIFA Club World Cup.

== Results ==
Year	Host	Final			Third place match			Number of teams
Year	Host	Winners	Score	Runners-up	Third place	Score	Fourth place	Number of teams
2012 details	Japan	(France); Olympique Lyonnais	2–1 (a.e.t.)	(Japan); INAC Kobe Leonessa	(Japan); NTV Beleza	4–3	(Australia); Canberra United	4
2013 details	Japan	(Japan); INAC Kobe Leonessa	4–2	(England); Chelsea	(Australia); Sydney FC	3–3; 4–2 (p)	(Chile); Colo Colo	5
2014 details	Japan	(Brazil); São José	2–0	(England); Arsenal	(Japan); Urawa Red Diamonds	4–0	(Japan); Okayama Yunogo Belle	6

== Honours ==
Year	Most valuable player	Most impressive player	Top goalscorer
2012	(France) Corine Franco	(South Korea) Ji So-yun	(Switzerland) Lara Dickenmann (United States) Beverly Goebel-Yanez (Japan) Azusa Iwashimizu (Japan) Asano Nagasato
2013			(United States) Beverly Goebel-Yanez (Chile) Francisca Lara (Japan) Emi Nakajima (Australia) Renee Rollason
2014			(Japan) Saori Arimachi (Japan) Chinatsu Kira (Japan) Manami Nakano (Japan) Shinobu Ohno

== Prize money ==
The winners earned $60,000 out of a total purse of $100,000.

== See also ==
- FIFA Women's Club World Cup
- pt:Torneio Internacional Interclubes de Futebol Feminino
- Women's International Champions Cup
