= 2025 Racing Louisville FC season =

Racing Louisville FC 2025 soccer season

Racing Louisville FC
2025 season
- General manager: Caitlyn Flores Milby
- Head coach: Bev Yanez
- Stadium: Lynn Family Stadium (capacity: 11,700)
- 2025: 7th of 14
- Playoffs: Quarterfinals
- Top goalscorer: League: Emma Sears (10); All: Emma Sears (10)
- Highest home attendance: 8,113
- Lowest home attendance: 2,847
- Average home league attendance: 5,409
- Biggest win: 2–0 (Jun 20 vs. ORL)
- Biggest defeat: 1–4 (Apr 19 at SD)
Home colours	Away colours
- All statistics correct as of November 8, 2025.

The 2025 Racing Louisville FC season was the team's fifth season as a professional women's soccer team. Racing Louisville FC plays in the National Women's Soccer League (NWSL), the top tier of women's soccer in the United States.

Racing Louisville finished the season in 7th place and qualified for the NWSL playoffs for the first time in history; it also marked the first year in which the club did not end the NWSL year in 9th. In Louisville's first-round playoff match against the Washington Spirit, Kayla Fischer scored a stoppage-time equalizer to push the game into extra time, but Racing were eventually vanquished on penalties.

At the end of the season, Bev Yanez was named NWSL Coach of the Year, and both Taylor Flint and Emma Sears received berths on the NWSL Second XI.

== Background ==
In 2024, Racing Louisville finished in ninth place for the fourth year in a row, falling just outside of a playoff berth. However, under new head coach Bev Yanez, the Racing managed to set new single-season club records in total points, goals scored, and total home attendance.

=== Offseason transactions ===
In the offseason, Racing re-signed multiple players, including captain Arin Wright and eventual starting goalkeeper Jordyn Bloomer. The club took advantage of the elimination of the NWSL Draft by signing a large group of rookies; many of Louisville's college signings eventually became regular contributors throughout the season, such as Ella Hase, Katie O'Kane, and Sarah Weber. The offseason included the departures of Abby Erceg and Parker Goins, two players who had been at Louisville for multiple seasons. South African midfielder Linda Motlhalo was the third and final player to leave Louisville over the winter.

=== Kit changes ===
As part of a league-wide refresh, Racing Louisville announced its new secondary kit, called 'Roots', in February 2025. The new jerseys are colored a solid dark green, celebrating the "common ground connection between Racing and the Louisville community."

== Team ==
=== Coaching staff ===
As of August 30, 2025

Technical
Head coach	Beverly Yanez
Assistant coach	Mitch Sowerby
Goalkeeper coach	Sergio Gonzalez
Support
Head athletic trainer	Tara Condon
Assistant athletic trainer	Isabelle Clarke
Head equipment manager	Sarah Kanuch

=== Current squad ===
As of October 18, 2025

No.	Nat.	Name	Date of birth (age)	Since	Previous team	Notes (Note: denotes a season-ending injury.)
Goalkeepers
1	(United States)	Katie Lund	November 27, 1996 (aged 28)	2021	(United States) Washington Spirit	–
24	(United States)	Jordyn Bloomer	October 14, 1997 (aged 27)	2022	(United States) Wisconsin Badgers	–
33	(Puerto Rico)	Cristina Roque	November 6, 2001 (aged 23)	2025	(United States) Utah Royals	–
77	(United States)	Madison White	June 15, 2001 (aged 23)	2024	(United States) Texas Tech Red Raiders	–
99	(United States)	Olivia Sekany	December 29, 1998 (aged 26)	2023	(United States) Washington Huskies	
Defenders
2	(United States)	Lauren Milliet	December 1, 1996 (aged 28)	2021	(United States) North Carolina Courage	–
3	(United States)	Arin Wright	December 25, 1992 (aged 32)	2024	(United States) Chicago Red Stars	–
4	(United States)	Makenna Morris	April 26, 2002 (aged 22)	2025	(United States) Washington Spirit	–
5	(United States)	Ellie Jean	January 31, 1997 (aged 28)	2024	(United States) NJ/NY Gotham FC	–
6	(United States)	Ella Hase	July 12, 2002 (aged 22)	2025	(United States) Duke Blue Devils	–
11	(United States)	Courtney Petersen	October 28, 1997 (aged 27)	2024	(United States) Houston Dash	–
12	(United States)	Allie George	March 25, 2003 (aged 21)	2025	(United States) Virginia Tech Hokies	–
17	(United States)	Maddie Pokorny	November 24, 1996 (aged 28)	2023	(Denmark) HB Køge	–
Midfielders
7	(United States)	Savannah DeMelo	March 26, 1998 (aged 26)	2022	(United States) USC Trojans	–
8	(Brazil)	Ary Borges	December 28, 1999 (aged 25)	2023	(Brazil) Palmeiras	INT
9	(United States)	Kayla Fischer	January 5, 2000 (aged 25)	2023	(United States) Ohio State Buckeyes	–
14	(United States)	Marisa DiGrande	February 5, 1997 (aged 28)	2024	(United States) Houston Dash	–
19	(United States)	Jordan Baggett	October 28, 1996 (aged 28)	2023	(United States) Washington Spirit	–
20	(United States)	Katie O'Kane	January 18, 2002 (aged 23)	2025	(United States) Utah Utes	–
26	(United States)	Taylor Flint	November 22, 1998 (aged 26)	2024	(United States) San Diego Wave FC	–
32	(United States)	Avery Kalitta	July 15, 2003 (aged 21)	2025	(United States) Michigan Wolverines	–
Forwards
13	(United States)	Emma Sears	February 23, 2001 (aged 24)	2024	(United States) Ohio State Buckeyes	–
16	(Canada)	Janine Sonis	August 20, 1994 (aged 30)	2024	(United States) Portland Thorns	–
22	(United States)	Kirsten Wright	September 8, 1998 (aged 26)	2022	(United States) Texas Tech Red Raiders	, ML
29	(Nigeria)	Uchenna Kanu	June 20, 1997 (aged 27)	2023	(Mexico) Tigres UANL	INT
42	(United States)	Sarah Weber	February 14, 2003 (aged 22)	2025	(United States) Nebraska Cornhuskers	–
88	(United States)	Bethany Balcer	March 7, 1997 (aged 28)	2024	(United States) Seattle Reign FC	–

==== Out on loan ====
No.	Pos.	Nation	Player
18	FW	NZL	Milly Clegg (on loan to Halifax Tides FC)

== Competitions ==
Win Draw Loss

=== Preseason ===
Racing Louisville played in three closed-door preseason friendlies prior to kicking off the NWSL regular season in March.

February 20	Racing Louisville FC	–	Washington Spirit	Bradenton, Florida
				Stadium: IMG Academy
Note: Closed-door scrimmage. No scoreline announced.

February 23	Racing Louisville FC	–	Kansas City Current	Bradenton, Florida
				Stadium: IMG Academy
Note: Closed-door scrimmage. No scoreline announced.

March 8	Chicago Stars FC	–	Racing Louisville FC	West Lafayette, Indiana
				Stadium: Purdue University
Note: Closed-door scrimmage. No scoreline announced.

=== Regular season ===
March 15 1	Racing Louisville FC	1–1	North Carolina Courage	Louisville, Kentucky
5:00 pm ET	Sears 13'	Report	Lussi (yellow card) 63'; Jackson 69'	Stadium: Lynn Family Stadium; Attendance: 2,847; Referee: Adorae Monroy

March 22 2	Bay FC	2–0	Racing Louisville FC	San Jose, California
10:00 pm ET	Pickett (yellow card) 2'; Anderson 12'; Bailey (yellow card) 45+1'; Lema 45+2'; Huff (yellow card) 45+6'	Report	Fischer (yellow card) 90+8'	Stadium: PayPal Park; Attendance: 14,742; Referee: Danielle Chesky

March 30 3	Chicago Stars FC	0–1	Racing Louisville FC	Bridgeview, Illinois
4:00 pm ET	Gaynor (yellow card) 12'; Roccaro (yellow card) 41'; Groom (yellow card) 84'	Report	Sears 27'	Stadium: SeatGeek Stadium; Attendance: 1,806; Referee: Laura Rodriguez

April 12 4	Racing Louisville FC	0–2	Washington Spirit	Louisville, Kentucky
5:00 pm ET		Report	Santos 58'; Narumi (yellow card) 65'; Hatch 75'	Stadium: Lynn Family Stadium; Attendance: 7,886; Referee: Matthew Corrigan

April 19 5	Racing Louisville FC	1–4	San Diego Wave FC	Louisville, Kentucky
3:00 pm ET	Hase (yellow card) 39'; Fischer (yellow card) 45'; Borges 45+6' (pen.)	Report	Dali 17'; Barcenas 50'; Cascarino 60', 77'	Stadium: Lynn Family Stadium; Attendance: 4,431; Referee: Jaclyn Metz

April 27 6	Portland Thorns FC	3–3	Racing Louisville FC	Portland, Oregon
4:00 pm ET	Turner 17'; Fleming 45+5' (pen.); Reyes (yellow card) 90+6'; Perry 90+10' (pen.)	Report	DeMelo 9'; Fischer 32'; Sears 39'; Borges (red card) 90+12'	Stadium: Providence Park; Attendance: 16,219; Referee: Corbyn May

May 2 7	Houston Dash	1–2	Racing Louisville FC	Houston, Texas
8:00 pm ET	Patterson 8'; Westphal (yellow card) 52'; Graham (yellow card) 72'	Report	Fischer 20'; DiGrande (yellow card) 62'; Sears 70'	Stadium: Shell Energy Stadium; Attendance: 5,765; Referee: Marie Durr

May 9 8	Racing Louisville FC	1–0	Gotham FC	Louisville, Kentucky
8:00 pm ET	Fischer (yellow card) 16'; Flint 56'	Report	Howell (yellow card) 7'; Geyse (yellow card) 55'; Torres (yellow card) 84'	Stadium: Lynn Family Stadium; Attendance: 5,495; Referee: Muhammad Hassan

May 16 9	Racing Louisville FC	0–1	Seattle Reign FC	Louisville, Kentucky
7:30 pm ET		Report	Dahlien 39'; Mason (yellow card) 90'; Bugg (yellow card) 90+6'	Stadium: Lynn Family Stadium; Attendance: 3,039; Referee: Iryna Petrunok

May 24 10	Angel City FC	2–3	Racing Louisville FC	Los Angeles, California
10:00 pm ET	Hodge (yellow card) 9'; Tiernan 48'; A. Thompson 68'; Zelem (yellow card) 90+7'	Report	Flint (yellow card) 15', (goal) 23' (pen.); O'Kane (yellow card) 45+2'; Sears 53'; DeMelo 56'; Fischer (red card) 67'	Stadium: BMO Stadium; Attendance: 16,740; Referee: Elvis Osmanovic

June 6 11	Racing Louisville FC	3–2	Utah Royals	Louisville, Kentucky
7:30 pm ET	Sears 9', (yellow card) 68'; Sonis 26'; Weber 85'; DeMelo (yellow card) 90+1'	Report	Mozingo 3'; St-Georges 31', (yellow card) 52'; Tejada (yellow card) 45+2' (red card) 73'; Rábano (yellow card) 71'	Stadium: Lynn Family Stadium; Attendance: 3,951; Referee: Adorae Monroy

June 14 12	Kansas City Current	4–2	Racing Louisville FC	Kansas City, Missouri
7:30 pm ET	Milliet 2' (o.g.); Cooper 15'; Zaneratto 19'; R. Rodríguez (yellow card) 35'; Feist (yellow card) 82'; Chawinga 90+5'	Report	Petersen (yellow card) 36'; Flint (yellow card) 60'; Sonis 62'; Kanu 88'	Stadium: CPKC Stadium; Attendance: 11,500; Referee: Jaclyn Metz

June 20 13	Racing Louisville FC	2–0	Orlando Pride	Louisville, Kentucky
8:00 pm ET	A. Wright 30'; Flint 68' (pen.), (yellow card) 71'; O'Kane (yellow card) 83'	Report	McCutcheon (yellow card) 43'	Stadium: Lynn Family Stadium; Attendance: 5,469; Referee: John Matto

August 1 14	Racing Louisville FC	0–2	Kansas City Current	Louisville, Kentucky
8:00 pm ET	Fischer (yellow card) 57'; Hase (yellow card) 83'	Report	Chawinga 65'; Ball 72'; Hopkins (yellow card) 90+3'	Stadium: Lynn Family Stadium; Attendance: 8,113; Referee: Nabil Bensalah

August 9 15	Orlando Pride	1–1	Racing Louisville FC	Orlando Pride
7:30 pm ET	DiGrande 45+4'; DeMelo (yellow card) 55'	Report	Lemos (yellow card) 35'; Borges 90+3' (o.g.)	Stadium: Inter&Co Stadium; Attendance: 7,003; Referee: Iryna Petrunok

August 15 16	Washington Spirit	2–2	Racing Louisville FC	Washington, D.C.
8:00 pm ET	Santos (yellow card) 27'; Cantore 39'; Hershfelt (yellow card) 58'; Kouassi 90+10'	Report	Petersen (yellow card) 33'; Bernal 53' (o.g.); DeMelo 80' (pen.); Hase (yellow card) 85'; Borges (yellow card) 90+6'	Stadium: Audi Field; Attendance: 11,691; Referee: John Matto

August 24 17	San Diego Wave FC	0–1	Racing Louisville FC	San Diego, California
8:00 pm ET		Report	Borges (yellow card) 22'; Flint (yellow card) 48'; Sears 59', (yellow card) 62'	Stadium: Snapdragon Stadium; Attendance: 12,966; Referee: Ekaterina Koroleva

August 29 18	Racing Louisville FC	1–1	Houston Dash	Louisville, Kentucky
7:30 pm ET	Fischer (yellow card) 8'; Flint 71', (yellow card) 90+7'; DeMelo (yellow card) 77'	Report	Sheehan (yellow card) 45+4'; Duljan 90+1'	Stadium: Lynn Family Stadium; Attendance: 6,095

September 5 19	Racing Louisville FC	1–2	Portland Thorns FC	Louisville, Kentucky
8:00 pm ET	O'Kane 22'; DeMelo (yellow card) 90+4'	Report	Dufour 31', (yellow card) 36'; Perry (yellow card) 75'; Alidou (yellow card) 89'; Jean 90' (o.g.)	Stadium: Lynn Family Stadium; Attendance: 6,102; Referee: Gerald Flores

September 14 20	Seattle Reign FC	1–0	Racing Louisville FC	Seattle, Washington
8:00 pm ET	Meza (yellow card) 64'; Fishlock 90'; Bugg (yellow card) 90+7'	Report	Jean (yellow card) 31'; Flint (yellow card) 90+2'	Stadium: Lumen Field; Referee: Jaclyn Metz
Note: Suspended at halftime due to a medical emergency involving Savannah DeMelo and completed on September 16 behind closed doors.

September 19 21	Utah Royals	3–2	Racing Louisville FC	Sandy, Utah
10:00 pm ET	Tanaka 13', (yellow card) 53'; Thomsen 38'; Lacasse 45+3'; Rábano (yellow card) 77'; McGlynn (yellow card) 77'; Del Fava (yellow card) 90+2'	Report	Sears (yellow card) 57', (goal) 68'; DiGrande (yellow card) 71'; Sonis 81'	Stadium: America First Field; Attendance: 8,426; Referee: Lauren Aldrich

September 27 22	Racing Louisville FC	1–0	Angel City FC	Louisville, Kentucky
7:30 pm ET	Flint (yellow card) 19'; Weber 66'	Report	Martin (yellow card) 21'; Shores (yellow card) 29'; Niehues (yellow card) 45+2'; Hodge (yellow card) 80'	Stadium: Lynn Family Stadium; Referee: Shawn Tehini

October 4 23	North Carolina Courage	1–3	Racing Louisville FC	Cary, North Carolina
7:30 pm ET	Manaka 55'	Report	Flint (yellow card) 7'; Sears 49', 79'; Fischer 59', (yellow card) 61'	Stadium: WakeMed Soccer Park; Attendance: 7,218; Referee: Jeremy Scheer

October 10 24	Racing Louisville FC	1–1	Chicago Stars FC	Louisville, Kentucky
7:30 pm ET	Weber (yellow card) 45+1'; Balcer 90+3'	Report	Nesbeth (yellow card) 82'; Joseph 85'	Stadium: Lynn Family Stadium; Attendance: 5,703; Referee: Greg Dopka

October 19 25	Gotham FC	2–2	Racing Louisville FC	Harrison, New Jersey
3:00 pm ET	Howell 15'; Bruninha (yellow card) 53'; Sonnett (yellow card) 67'; Lavelle 85'	Report	Sonis 29'; Weber 65'; Flint 84'	Stadium: Sports Illustrated Stadium; Attendance: 11,219; Referee: Alexandra Billeter

November 2 26	Racing Louisville FC	1–0	Bay FC	Louisville, Kentucky
5:00 pm ET	A. Wright (yellow card) 6'; Hase 48'; Flint (yellow card) 57'; Borges (yellow card) 66'; Bloomer (yellow card) 90+1'	Report	Conti (yellow card) 68'; Lema (yellow card) 90+1'	Stadium: Lynn Family Stadium; Attendance: 6,574; Referee: Shawn Tehini

==== Regular-season standings ====
Pos	Team	Pld	W	D	L	GF	GA	GD	Pts	Qualification
5	Seattle Reign FC	26	10	9	7	32	29	+3	39	Playoffs
6	San Diego Wave FC	26	10	7	9	41	34	+7	37	Playoffs
7	Racing Louisville FC	26	10	7	9	35	38	−3	37	Playoffs
8	Gotham FC (C)	26	9	9	8	35	25	+10	36	Playoffs and CONCACAF W Champions Cup
9	North Carolina Courage	26	9	8	9	37	39	−2	35	

Source: NWSL
Rules for classification: 1) points; 2) total goal difference; 3) total wins; 4) total goals scored; 5) head-to-head points; 6) head-to-head goals scored; 7) fewest disciplinary points; 8) coin toss (if 2 clubs tied) or drawing of lots (if ≥3 clubs tied).
(C) Champions

=== Playoffs ===
==== Bracket ====
Quarterfinals
1	Kansas City Current	1
8	Gotham FC (a.e.t.)	2
4	Orlando Pride	2
5	Seattle Reign FC	0
2	Washington Spirit (p)	1 (3)
7	Racing Louisville FC	1 (1)
3	Portland Thorns FC (a.e.t.)	1
6	San Diego Wave FC	0

Semifinals
8	Gotham FC	1
4	Orlando Pride	0
2	Washington Spirit	2
3	Portland Thorns FC	0

Championship
8	Gotham FC	1
2	Washington Spirit	0

==== Results ====
November 8, 2025 Quarterfinals	Washington Spirit	1–1 (3–1 p)	Racing Louisville	Washington, D.C.
12:00 pm EST	Monday 73'	Report	Fischer 90+2'	Stadium: Audi Field; Attendance: 19,215; Referee: Nabil Bensalah
	Penalties
	Bernal (penalty scored); Morgan (penalty scored); Hershfelt (penalty scored)		(penalty scored) Balcer; (penalty missed) Jean; (penalty missed) DiGrande; (penalty missed) Borges

== Statistics ==
As of November 8, 2025

=== Appearances and goals ===
Starting appearances are listed first, followed by substitute appearances after the + symbol where applicable.

No.	Pos	Nat	Player	Total		NWSL		Playoffs	
No.	Pos	Nat	Player	Apps	Goals	Apps	Goals	Apps	Goals
Goalkeepers
1	GK	(United States) USA	Katie Lund	6	0	6	0	0	0
24	GK	(United States) USA	Jordyn Bloomer	21	0	20	0	1	0
33	GK	(Puerto Rico) PUR	Cristina Roque	0	0	0	0	0	0
77	GK	(United States) USA	Madison White	0	0	0	0	0	0
99	GK	(United States) USA	Olivia Sekany	0	0	0	0	0	0
Defenders
2	DF	(United States) USA	Lauren Milliet	20	0	16+3	0	1	0
3	DF	(United States) USA	Arin Wright	23	1	21+1	1	1	0
4	DF	(United States) USA	Makenna Morris	6	0	4+2	0	0	0
5	DF	(United States) USA	Ellie Jean	24	1	23	1	1	0
6	DF	(United States) USA	Ella Hase	24	1	17+6	1	1	0
11	DF	(United States) USA	Courtney Petersen	25	0	23+1	0	0+1	0
12	DF	(United States) USA	Allie George	0	0	0	0	0	0
17	DF	(United States) USA	Maddie Pokorny	0	0	0	0	0	0
Midfielders
7	MF	(United States) USA	Savannah DeMelo	18	3	17+1	3	0	0
8	MF	(Brazil) BRA	Ary Borges	22	1	16+5	1	1	0
9	MF	(United States) USA	Kayla Fischer	22	4	16+5	3	0+1	1
14	MF	(United States) USA	Marisa DiGrande	24	1	5+18	1	0+1	0
19	MF	(United States) USA	Jordan Baggett	0	0	0	0	0	0
20	MF	(United States) USA	Katie O'Kane	27	1	16+10	1	1	0
26	MF	(United States) USA	Taylor Flint	24	4	23	4	1	0
32	MF	(United States) USA	Avery Kalitta	0	0	0	0	0	0
Forwards
13	FW	(United States) USA	Emma Sears	27	10	26	10	1	0
16	FW	(Canada) CAN	Janine Sonis	27	3	23+3	3	1	0
22	FW	(United States) USA	Kirsten Wright	0	0	0	0	0	0
29	FW	(Nigeria) NGR	Uchenna Kanu	7	1	0+7	1	0	0
42	FW	(United States) USA	Sarah Weber	26	3	14+11	3	1	0
88	FW	(United States) USA	Bethany Balcer	12	1	0+11	1	0+1	0
Players away from the club on loan:
18	FW	(New Zealand) NZL	Milly Clegg	0	0	0	0	0	0
Players who left the club during the season:
4	DF	(Finland) FIN	Elli Pikkujämsä	1	0	0+1	0	0	0
15	DF	(Colombia) COL	Ángela Barón	0	0	0	0	0	0
23	FW	(Colombia) COL	Elexa Bahr	0	0	0	0	0	0
31	DF	(United States) USA	Katie Scott	0	0	0	0	0	0
Own goals for:
—	—	(Mexico) MEX	Rebeca Bernal (8/15 v. WAS)	0	1	0	1	0	0

== Transactions ==
=== Contract operations ===
Date	Player	Pos.	Notes	Ref.
December 10, 2024	(Finland) Elli Pikkujämsä	DF	Mutual contract option exercised.	
January 3, 2025	(United States) Arin Wright	DF	Re-signed to a two-year contract through 2026 with an option for 2027.	
January 10, 2025	(United States) Jordyn Bloomer	GK	Re-signed to a two-year contract through 2026.	
May 6, 2025	(United States) Avery Kalitta	MF	Re-signed to a one-year contract through 2025.	
June 4, 2025	(Puerto Rico) Cristina Roque	GK	Re-signed to a two-year contract through 2026 with an option for 2027.	
July 1, 2025	(United States) Kayla Fischer	MF	Re-signed to a two-year contract through 2027.	
July 1, 2025	(United States) Katie O'Kane	MF	Re-signed to a two-year contract through 2027.	
July 1, 2025	(United States) Courtney Petersen	DF	Re-signed to a two-year contract through 2027.	
July 15, 2025	(United States) Taylor Flint	MF	Re-signed to a three-year contract through 2028.	
August 12, 2025	(United States) Ellie Jean	DF	Re-signed to a three-year contract through 2028.	
October 9, 2025	(United States) Emma Sears	FW	Re-signed to a three-year contract through 2028.	

=== Loans in ===
Date	Player	Pos.	Previous club	Fee/notes	Ref.
August 7, 2025	(United States) Katie Scott	DF	(United States) Kansas City Current	Loaned through the 2025 NWSL season.	

=== Loans out ===
Date	Player	Pos.	Destination club	Fee/notes	Ref.
January 28, 2025	(New Zealand) Milly Clegg	FW	(Canada) Halifax Tides FC	Loaned through the 2025 NWSL season.	
January 30, 2025	(Colombia) Elexa Bahr	FW	(Colombia) América de Cali	Loaned through the 2025 NWSL season.	
August 12, 2025	(United States) Allie George	DF	(United States) Fort Lauderdale United FC	Loaned through the 2025 NWSL season (Note: Recalled early on September 18, 2025.)	

=== Transfers in ===
Date	Player	Pos.	Previous club	Fee/notes	Ref.
January 16, 2025	(United States) Ella Hase	DF	(United States) Duke Blue Devils	Rookie signed to a two-year contract through 2026 with a mutual option for 2027.	
January 17, 2025	(United States) Sarah Weber	FW	(United States) Nebraska Cornhuskers	Rookie signed to a two-year contract through 2026.	
January 20, 2025	(United States) Allie George	DF	(United States) Virginia Tech Hokies	Rookie signed to a one-year contract.	
February 21, 2025	(United States) Katie O'Kane	MF	(United States) Utah Utes	Rookie signed to a one-year contract.	
March 12, 2025	(United States) Maddy Anderson	GK	(United States) Mississippi State Bulldogs	Rookie signed to a short-term contract through June 22, 2025	
March 21, 2025	(United States) Avery Kalitta	MF	(United States) Michigan Wolverines	Rookie signed to a short-term injury replacement contract.	
June 4, 2025	(Puerto Rico) Cristina Roque	GK	(United States) Utah Royals	Acquired in exchange for $50,000 in allocation money.	
August 27, 2025	(United States) Makenna Morris	DF	(United States) Washington Spirit	Acquired in exchange for $115,000 in allocation money.	

=== Transfers out ===
Date	Player	Pos.	Destination club	Fee/notes	Ref.
December 10, 2024	(New Zealand) Abby Erceg	DF	(Mexico) Deportivo Toluca	Out of contract.	
December 10, 2024	(United States) Parker Goins	FW	(United States) Tampa Bay Sun FC	Out of contract.	
February 7, 2025	(South Africa) Linda Motlhalo	MF	(Scotland) Glasgow City	Mutual contract termination.	
July 21, 2025	(Finland) Elli Pikkujämsä	DF	(Sweden) FC Rosengård	Transferred out in exchange for an undisclosed fee.	
September 17, 2025	(Colombia) Elexa Bahr	FW	(Italy) Genoa	Mutual contract termination.	
September 22, 2025	(Colombia) Ángela Barón	DF	(France) Le Havre AC	Mutual contract termination.	

=== Injury listings ===
Date	Player	Pos.	List	Injury	Ref.
April 4, 2024	(Finland) Elli Pikkujämsä	DF	Season-ending injury	Torn patellar tendon sustained in a match against Portland Thorns FC in March 2024.	
July 30, 2024	(United States) Kirsten Wright	FW	Season-ending injury	Knee injury sustained in 2024 preseason.	
March 12, 2025	(United States) Olivia Sekany	GK	Season-ending injury	Leg injury sustained in a match against Sydney FC while on loan.	
March 28, 2025	(United States) Maddie Pokorny	MF	45-day injury	Hip labrum injury suffered in training.	
May 7, 2025	(United States) Maddie Pokorny	MF	Season-ending injury	Hip labrum injury suffered in training.	
May 7, 2025	(United States) Katie Lund	GK	Season-ending injury	Hip labrum injury.	

=== Preseason trialists ===
Trialists are non-rostered invitees during preseason and are not automatically signed. Racing Louisville released its initial preseason roster on January 21, 2025, before supplementing the squad with additional trialists as preseason continued.

Player	Pos.	Previous club	Status	Ref.
(United States) Maddy Anderson	GK	(United States) Mississippi State Bulldogs	Signed to short-term contract.	
(United States) Meg Boade	MF	(United States) UCLA Bruins	Not signed.	
(United States) Kennedi Cotter	FW	(United States) Paisley Athletic FC	Not signed.	
(United States) Makayla DeMelo	MF	(United States) Long Beach State Beach	Not signed.	
(United States) Ginger Fontenot	DF	(United States) Penn State Nittany Lions	Not signed.	
(United States) Avery Kalitta	MF	(United States) Michigan Wolverines	Signed to short-term contract.	
(United States) Audrey McKeen	FW	(United States) Virginia Development Academy	Not signed.	
(United States) Katie O'Kane	FW	(United States) Utah Utes	Signed to standard contract.	
(United States) Kelsey Oyler	MF	(United States) Arkansas Razorbacks	Not signed.	
(United States) Kaitlyn Parks	GK	(United States) Michigan State Spartans	Not signed.	
(United States) Brooklyn Vann	DF	(United States) Cincinnati United Premier	Not signed.	
(Canada) Holly Ward	FW	(United States) Texas Longhorns	Not signed.	
