= 2024 Racing Louisville FC season =

Racing Louisville FC 2024 soccer season

Racing Louisville FC
2024 season
- General manager: Ryan Dell (until Nov 26)
- Manager: Bev Yanez
- Stadium: Lynn Family Stadium (capacity: 11,700)
- League: 9th
- NWSL x Liga MX Femenil Summer Cup: Group stage
- Playoffs: DNQ
- Top goalscorer: League: Savannah DeMelo, Uchenna Kanu, Emma Sears (5); All: Emma Sears (6)
- Highest home attendance: 11,365
- Lowest home attendance: 2,137
- Average home league attendance: 6,223
- Biggest win: 5–1 (Apr 20 vs. UTA)
- Biggest defeat: 1–4 (Oct 13 at WAS)
Home colours	Away colours
- All statistics correct as of November 3, 2024.

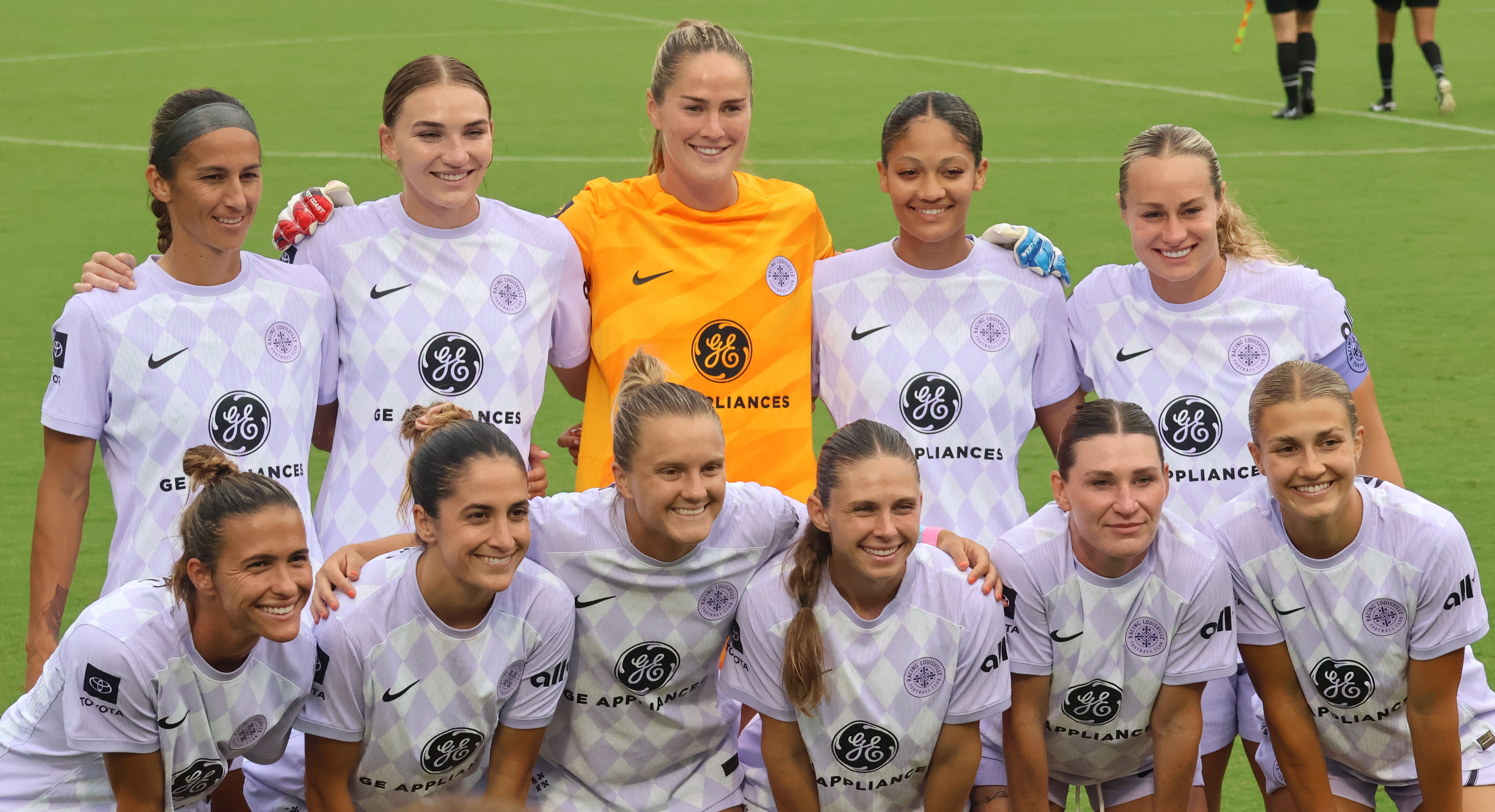
Week 16 starting lineup: Erceg, Flint, Lund, Turner, Howell Pickett, DeMelo, Milliet, A. Wright, DiGrande, Fischer

The 2024 Racing Louisville FC season was the team's fourth as a top-tier professional women's soccer team in the National Women's Soccer League.

The club finished the 2024 National Women's Soccer League season in ninth place and failed to qualify for the NWSL playoffs for the fourth consecutive season. It also finishied second in Group E during the 2024 NWSL x Liga MX Femenil Summer Cup and failed to advance to the mid-season tournament's knockout stages.

== Background ==
=== Hirings ===
After Racing Louisville announced head coach Kim Björkegren would not return for the 2024 season, the club hired former NWSL standout player Bev Yanez as its new coach. The 35-year-old spent the 2023 season as Racing's assistant coach after two years in the same role at NJ/NY Gotham FC.

Yanez added former UANL Tigres coach and Canada Women's National Football Team star Carmelina Moscato to her staff as assistant coach. Former men's collegiate coach Mitch Sowerby was also hired as an assistant coach.

=== Kit changes ===
As part of the NWSL's new collaboration with Nike, Racing Louisville announced two new kits for the 2024 season and beyond. The primary kit has an argyle pattern "inspired by traditional jockey silks." The secondary kit is a midnight violet gradient.

== Stadium and facilities ==
Racing Louisville plays its home games at Lynn Family Stadium, a soccer-specific stadium it shares with brother club Louisville City FC. The team trains at the Lynn Family Sports Vision & Training Center about two miles away from the stadium.

== Broadcasting ==
In November 2023, the NWSL announced its largest media rights deal in league history, worth a reported $240 million. The new broadcast agreement includes ABC, CBS, CBS Sports Network, ESPN, Prime Video and Scripps Sports. The NWSL also announced its new in-house streaming service, NWSL+.

For its local broadcast rights, Racing renewed its deal with WAVE, the NBC affiliate in Louisville. The club also started a new radio broadcast deal with iHeartMedia in Louisville, with games primarily carried by Sports Talk 790AM and News Talk 1080 AM.

== Technical staff ==
As of November 26, 2024

Position	Staff
General manager	Ryan Dell (Note: Dell served as the club's general manager through the 2024 season until Dell and Racing Louisville FC mutually ended his tenure on November 26, 2024.)
Head coach	Bev Yanez
Assistant coach	Carmelina Moscato
Assistant coach	Mitchell Sowerby
Goalkeepers coach	Sergio Gonzalez
Performance coach	Julie Twaddle
Video analyst	Charlie Tuley

== Players ==
As of November 3, 2024

No.	Pos.	Player	Nation
1	GK	Katie Lund	United States
2	DF	Lauren Milliet	United States
3	DF	Arin Wright	United States
4	DF	Elli Pikkujämsä	Finland
5	DF	Ellie Jean	United States
7	MF	Savannah DeMelo	United States
8	MF	Ary Borges	Brazil
9	MF	Kayla Fischer	United States
10	FW	Linda Motlhalo	South Africa
11	DF	Courtney Petersen	United States
13	FW	Emma Sears	United States
14	MF	Marisa DiGrande	United States
15	DF	Ángela Barón	Colombia
16	FW	Janine Beckie	Canada
17	DF	Maddie Pokorny	United States
18	FW	Milly Clegg	New Zealand
19	MF	Jordan Baggett	United States
20	DF	Abby Erceg	New Zealand
21	FW	Parker Goins	United States
22	FW	Kirsten Wright	United States
23	FW	Elexa Bahr	United States
24	GK	Jordyn Bloomer	United States
26	MF	Taylor Flint	United States
29	FW	Uchenna Kanu	Nigeria
88	FW	Bethany Balcer	United States

Players rostered during the season and loaned out
No.	Pos.	Player	Nation	Destination
99	GK	Olivia Sekany	United States	Brisbane Roar FC
77	GK	Madison White	United States	Dallas Trinity FC

Former players rostered during part of the season
No.	Pos.	Player	Nation
6	MF	Jaelin Howell	United States
11	MF	Yuuka Kurosaki	Japan
16	DF	Carson Pickett	United States
66	FW	Reilyn Turner	United States

== Transactions ==
=== 2024 NWSL Draft ===
Draft picks are not automatically signed to the roster.

Round	Pick	Player	Position	College	Status
1	6	Reilyn Turner	FW	UCLA	Signed
2	28	Emma Sears	FW	Ohio State	Signed
3	48	Sam Cary	DF	Iowa	
4	54	Madison White	GK	Texas Tech	Signed

=== Transfers in ===
Date	Player	Position	Previous club	Fee/notes	Ref.
Dec. 18, 2023	Ellie Jean	DF	NJ/NY Gotham FC	Trade via Bay FC	
Dec. 21, 2023	Marisa DiGrande	MF	Houston Dash	Free agent	
Jan. 4, 2024	Yuuka Kurosaki	MF	KuPS	Out of contract	
Jan. 12, 2024	Arin Wright	DF	Chicago Red Stars	Trade	
Jan. 17, 2024	Linda Motlhalo	FW	Glasgow City F.C.	Transfer	
Jan. 18, 2024	Elexa Bahr	FW	América de Cali	Transfer	
Jan. 22, 2024	Taylor Flint	MF	San Diego Wave FC	Trade for $150,000 in NWSL allocation money	
Jan. 22, 2024	Milly Clegg	FW	Western Sydney Wanderers FC	Out of contract	
Aug. 19, 2024	Bethany Balcer	FW	Seattle Reign FC	Trade for Jaelin Howell	
Aug. 21, 2024	Janine Beckie	FW	Portland Thorns FC	Trade for Reilyn Turner	

=== Transfers out ===
Date	Player	Position	Destination club	Fee/notes	Ref.
Nov. 9, 2023	Emina Ekic	FW	Melbourne City FC	Out of contract	
Dec. 15, 2023	Paige Monaghan	FW	Utah Royals	2024 NWSL Expansion Draft	
Dec. 20, 2023	Thembi Kgatlana	FW	Tigres UANL	$275,000 transfer fee	
Dec. 31, 2023	Alex Chidiac	MF	Melbourne Victory FC	Out of contract	
Dec. 31, 2023	Taylor Aylmer	MF		Out of contract	
Dec. 31, 2023	Nadia Nadim	FW	AC Milan	Out of contract	
Dec. 31, 2023	Rebecca Holloway	DF	Birmingham City W.F.C.	Out of contract	
Dec. 31, 2023	Jessica McDonald	FW		Out of contract	
Jan. 8, 2024	Hillary Beall	GK	San Diego Wave FC	Trade	
Jan. 24, 2024	Julia Lester	DF	Seattle Reign FC	Trade	
Aug. 15, 2024	Yuuka Kurosaki	MF	DC Power FC	Transfer; undisclosed fee	
Aug. 16, 2024	Carson Pickett	DF	Orlando Pride	Trade for $75,000 in NWSL allocation money	
Aug. 19, 2024	Jaelin Howell	MF	Seattle Reign FC	Trade for $50,000 in NWSL allocation money and Bethany Balcer	
Aug. 21, 2024	Reilyn Turner	FW	Portland Thorns FC	Trade for Janine Beckie	

== Competitions ==
=== NWSL standings ===
Pos	Team	Pld	W	D	L	GF	GA	GD	Pts	Qualification
1	Orlando Pride (C, S)	26	18	6	2	46	20	+26	60	NWSL Shield, playoffs, and CONCACAF W Champions Cup
2	Washington Spirit	26	18	2	6	51	28	+23	56	Playoffs, and CONCACAF W Champions Cup
3	NJ/NY Gotham FC	26	17	5	4	41	20	+21	56	Playoffs, and CONCACAF W Champions Cup (Note: With Orlando Pride winning both the 2024 National Women's Soccer League Championship and 2024 National Women's Soccer League Shield, the third qualifying spot for the United States went to the next best club in 2024 National Women's Soccer League Shield standings not already qualified, Gotham FC.)
4	Kansas City Current	26	16	7	3	57	31	+26	55	Playoffs
5	North Carolina Courage	26	12	3	11	34	28	+6	39	Playoffs
6	Portland Thorns FC	26	10	4	12	37	35	+2	34	Playoffs
7	Bay FC	26	11	1	14	31	41	−10	34	Playoffs
8	Chicago Red Stars	26	10	2	14	31	38	−7	32	Playoffs
9	Racing Louisville FC	26	7	7	12	33	39	−6	28	
10	San Diego Wave FC	26	6	7	13	24	35	−11	25	
11	Utah Royals	26	7	4	15	22	40	−18	25	
12	Angel City FC	26	7	6	13	29	42	−13	24 (Note: Angel City FC were deducted three points for breaching spending cap rules.)	
13	Seattle Reign FC	26	6	5	15	27	44	−17	23	
14	Houston Dash	26	5	5	16	20	42	−22	20	

Source: NWSL
Rules for classification: Tiebreakers
(C) Champions and W Champions Cup; (S) NWSL Shield

=== Regular season ===
March 16, 2024 1	Racing Louisville FC	2–2	Orlando Pride	Louisville, Kentucky
4:00 PM EST	Flint (yellow card) 3'; Bahr 13' (Turner); Kanu 19' (Bahr); DeMelo (yellow card) 37'; Howell (yellow card) 68'; Fischer (yellow card) 79'	Report	Strom (yellow card) 15' (yellow-red card) 62'; Pikkujämsä 24' (o.g.); Luana (yellow card) 43'; Yates 86' (Allen)	Stadium: Lynn Family Stadium; Attendance: 6,123; Referee: Laura Rodriguez

March 23, 2024 2	Houston Dash	0–0	Racing Louisville FC	Houston, Texas
8:30 PM EST	Solaun (yellow card) 43'; Puntigam (yellow card) 49'; van Zanten (yellow card) 86'	Report	Kanu (yellow card) 27'	Stadium: Shell Energy Stadium; Attendance: 8,600; Referee: Brandon Stevis

March 30, 2024 3	Portland Thorns FC	2–2	Racing Louisville FC	Portland, Oregon
7:30 PM EST	Fleming (yellow card) 24'; Weaver; Coffey 90+9' (Hubly)	Report	Kanu 3', 6' (Turner)	Stadium: Providence Park; Attendance: 16,688; Referee: Gerald Flores

April 13, 2024 4	Racing Louisville FC	0–0	San Diego Wave	Louisville, Kentucky
7:30 PM EST	Milliet (yellow card) 35'; Howell (yellow card) 80'	Report	Lundkvist (yellow card) 84'	Stadium: Lynn Family Stadium; Attendance: 6,818; Referee: Rebecca Pagan

April 20, 2024 5	Racing Louisville FC	5–1	Utah Royals	Louisville, Kentucky
5:00 PM EST	Milliet (yellow card) 13'; Kanu 26' (Milliet); DeMelo (yellow card) 37' (goal) 68', 78'; Turner 87' (Pickett); Sears 90+1' (DiGrande)	Report	Griffitts 45+3' (Sentnor); Flynn (yellow card) 72'	Stadium: Lynn Family Stadium; Attendance: 11,365; Referee: Joshua Encarnacion

April 28, 2024 6	NJ/NY Gotham FC	1–1	Racing Louisville FC	Harrison, New Jersey
5:00 PM EST	Martin (yellow card) 51'; Sonnett (yellow card) 70'; Lavelle 90+7' (Stevens) (yellow card) 90+12'	Report	DeMelo (yellow card) 53'; Turner 90+5'	Stadium: Red Bull Arena; Attendance: 6,015; Referee: Calin Radosav

May 5, 2024 7	Orlando Pride	1–0	Racing Louisville FC	Orlando, Florida
6:00 PM EST	Banda 17' (Sams); Abello (yellow card) 26'; Gautrat (yellow card) 90+3'	Report	Fischer (yellow card) 39'	Stadium: Inter&Co Stadium; Attendance: 6,837; Referee: Alyssa Nichols

May 10, 2024 8	Racing Louisville FC	1–2	Washington Spirit	Louisville, Kentucky
8:00 PM EST	DeMelo 45+6'; Fischer (yellow card) 59'; Sears (yellow card) 68'	Report	Bethune 5' (Sullivan); Milliet 34' (o.g.); Sullivan (yellow card) 45+9'; Hershfelt (yellow card) 53'; Metayer (yellow card) 87'	Stadium: Lynn Family Stadium; Attendance: 6,222; Referee: Shawn Tehini

May 18, 2024 9	Kansas City Current	3–3	Racing Louisville FC	Kansas City, Missouri
9:30 PM EST	Rodriguez (yellow card) 12'; Mace (yellow card) 33'; LaBonta 45+3' (pen.); Cooper 56' (Debinha); Robinson (yellow card) 72' (goal) 90+2' (Chawinga)	Report	Sears 18' (Milliet); Fischer (yellow card) 23'; Erceg 68' (Pickett); Flint (yellow card) 89'; DeMelo 90+13' (Erceg)	Stadium: CPKC Stadium; Attendance: 11,500; Referee: Nabil Bensalah

May 25, 2024 10	Chicago Red Stars	0–1	Racing Louisville FC	Bridgeview, Illinois
7:30 PM EST	Milazzo (yellow card) 34'; Nesbeth (yellow card) 39'; Hocking (yellow card) 49'	Report	Wright (yellow card) 24'; Sears 26'; Fischer (yellow card) 58'	Stadium: SeatGeek Stadium; Attendance: 3,872; Referee: Rebecca Pagan

June 7, 2024 11	Racing Louisville FC	2–0	Houston Dash	Louisville, Kentucky
8:00 PM EST	Kanu (yellow card) 60'; DeMelo 62'; Turner (yellow card) 78'; Goins 85' (DeMelo)	Report	Puntigam (yellow card) 43'; Patterson (yellow card) 87'	Stadium: Lynn Family Stadium; Attendance: 6,061; Referee: Katja Koroleva

June 15, 2024 12	Racing Louisville FC	0–2	NJ/NY Gotham FC	Louisville, Kentucky
1:00 PM EST	Flint (yellow card) 22'; Pokorny (yellow card) 90+5'	Report	Stengel 5'; Ryan 21' (Dunn); Stevens 53' (Freeman); López (yellow card) 90+4'	Stadium: Lynn Family Stadium; Attendance: 6,412; Referee: Danielle Chesky

June 19, 2024 13	Angel City FC	3–2	Racing Louisville FC	Los Angeles, CA
7:00 p.m. PDT (UTC-7)	Rodríguez (yellow card) 12' (goal) 32'; Fuller 17' (Curry); Reid (yellow card) 39'; Mathias (yellow card) 45+8'; Hammond (yellow card) 63'; Leroux 85' (A. Thompson)	Report	Flint 41' (pen.); Fischer (yellow card) 45+2'; Pickett 64' (Emma Sears); Howell (yellow card) 74'	Stadium: BMO Stadium; Attendance: 16,735; Referee: Lorenzo Hernandez

June 23, 2024 14	Seattle Reign FC	1–1	Racing Louisville FC	Seattle, Washington
6:00 PM EST	Balcer 10' (pen.); Huitema (yellow card) 57'	Report	Wright (red card) 9'; Flint (yellow card) 31'; Turner 90+7' (Howell)	Stadium: Lumen Field; Attendance: 10,715; Referee: Mathew Corrigan

June 29, 2024 15	Racing Louisville FC	0–1	Bay FC	Louisville, Kentucky
4:00 PM EST	Baggett (yellow card) 76'	Report	Anderson (yellow card) 13'; Oshoala 76' (pen.)	Stadium: Lynn Family Stadium; Attendance: 8,096; Referee: Laura Rodriguez

July 7, 2024 16	North Carolina Courage	3–1	Racing Louisville FC	Cary, North Carolina
4:30 PM EST	Sanchez 55'; Matsukubo 61'; Wingate 69'; Speck (yellow card) 80'	Report	Turner 31'; Fischer (yellow card) 33'; Howell (yellow card) 35'	Stadium: WakeMed Soccer Park; Attendance: 4,738; Referee: Anya Voigt

August 24, 2024 17	Racing Louisville FC	3–1	Chicago Red Stars	Louisville, Kentucky
7:30 PM EST	Kanu 12'; Milliet (yellow card) 42'; DiGrande 61'; Fischer 72'; Borges (yellow card) 90+2'	Report	Anderson (yellow card) 41'; Joseph (yellow card) 57', (goal) 59'; Nesbeth (yellow card) 67'	Stadium: Lynn Family Stadium; Attendance: 6,607; Referee: Shawn Tehini

August 31, 2024 18	Racing Louisville FC	2–3	Seattle Reign FC	Louisville, Kentucky
7:30 PM EST	Borges 6'; Flint 45'; DeMelo (yellow card) 61'	Report	Huerta 15' (pen.), (yellow card) 90+6'; Howell (yellow card) 62'; Ji 75'; Wright 81' (o.g.)	Stadium: Lynn Family Stadium; Attendance: 5.011; Referee: Laura Rodriguez

September 7, 2024 19	Bay FC	1–0	Racing Louisville FC	San Jose, California
7:00 PM PDT	Oshoala 75' (yellow card) 82'	Report		Stadium: PayPal Park; Attendance: 11,478; Referee: Rebecca Pagan

September 14, 2024 20	Racing Louisville FC	2–1	Angel City FC	Louisville, Kentucky
7:30 PM EST	Balcer 26' (Ary Borges); Fischer (yellow card) 66'; Beckie 68'; Ary Borges (yellow card) 74'; Sears (yellow card) 90+4'	Report	Dougherty Howard 18'; Spencer (yellow card) 72'; Bright (yellow card) 90+4'	Stadium: Lynn Family Stadium; Attendance: 5,493; Referee: Danielle Chesky

September 21, 2024 21	Racing Louisville FC	2–1	North Carolina Courage	Louisville, Kentucky
7:30 PM EST	Petersen (yellow card) 37'; Sears 78'; Balcer 90+2' (pen.)	Report	Sanchez (yellow card) 18'; Pinto 43'; Rauch (yellow card) 77'; Miura (yellow card) 88'; Williams (yellow card) 90+6'	Stadium: Lynn Family Stadium; Attendance: 4,853; Referee: Adorae Monroy

September 28, 2024 22	Utah Royals	1–0	Racing Louisville FC	Sandy, Utah
7:00 PM EST	Tucker (yellow card) 10'; Del Fava (yellow card) 56'; Riehl (yellow card) 66'; Tejada 78'; Burns (yellow card) 87'	Report	Flint (yellow card) 45+3'	Stadium: America First Field; Attendance: 9,002; Referee: Alexandra Billeter

October 5, 2024 23	Racing Louisville FC	0–2	Kansas City Current	Louisville, Kentucky
7:30 PM EST		Report	Chawinga 2'; DiBernardo 86'	Stadium: Lynn Family Stadium; Attendance: 6,013; Referee: Matthew Corrigan

October 13, 2024 24	Washington Spirit	4–1	Racing Louisville FC	Washington, D.C.
5:00 PM EST	Morris 35', 42'; Kouassi (yellow card) 41'; Hatch 55' (pen.); Silano 90+6'	Report	Sears 71'	Stadium: Audi Field; Referee: Abdou Ndiaye

October 19, 2024 25	Racing Louisville FC	1–0	Portland Thorns FC	Louisville, Kentucky
7:30 PM EST	Flint (yellow card) 60' (goal) 88'	Report	Moultrie (yellow card) 79'	Stadium: Lynn Family Stadium; Attendance: 5,905; Referee: Calin Radosav

November 3, 2024 26	Racing Louisville FC	1–3	San Diego Wave FC	Louisville, Kentucky
5:30 PM EST	Fischer (yellow card) 58'; Balcer 68'; Borges (yellow card) 86'	Report	Shaw 3'; Sánchez 22'; McNabb (yellow card) 60'; McCaskill 76'	Stadium: Lynn Family Stadium; Attendance: 2,137; Referee: Greg Dopka
Note: Relocated from San Diego on November 1 due to poor field conditions at Snapdragon Stadium.

=== NWSL x Liga MX Femenil Summer Cup ===
July 20, 2024	Racing Louisville FC (United States)	3–1	(Mexico) Monterrey	Louisville, United States
8:00 p.m.	Sears 36'; Fischer 47'; Borges 71'	Report	Servín 11'	Stadium: Lynn Family Stadium; Attendance: 4,362; Referee: Alex Billeter

July 26, 2024	Racing Louisville FC (United States)	1–1 (4–5 p)	(United States) North Carolina Courage	Louisville, United States
8:00 p.m.	Pickett 66'	Report	Jackson 90+1'	Stadium: Lynn Family Stadium
	Penalties
	Borges (penalty scored); DiGrande (penalty scored); Pickett (penalty scored); Turner (penalty scored); Howell (penalty missed)		(penalty scored) Jackson; (penalty scored) Kurtz; (penalty scored) Berkely; (penalty scored) Miura; (penalty scored) Lussi

August 1	Orlando Pride (United States)	1–1 (3–4 p)	(United States) Racing Louisville FC	Orlando, Florida
7:00 pm		Report		Stadium: Inter&Co Stadium
