= Ella Hase =

American soccer player (born 2002)

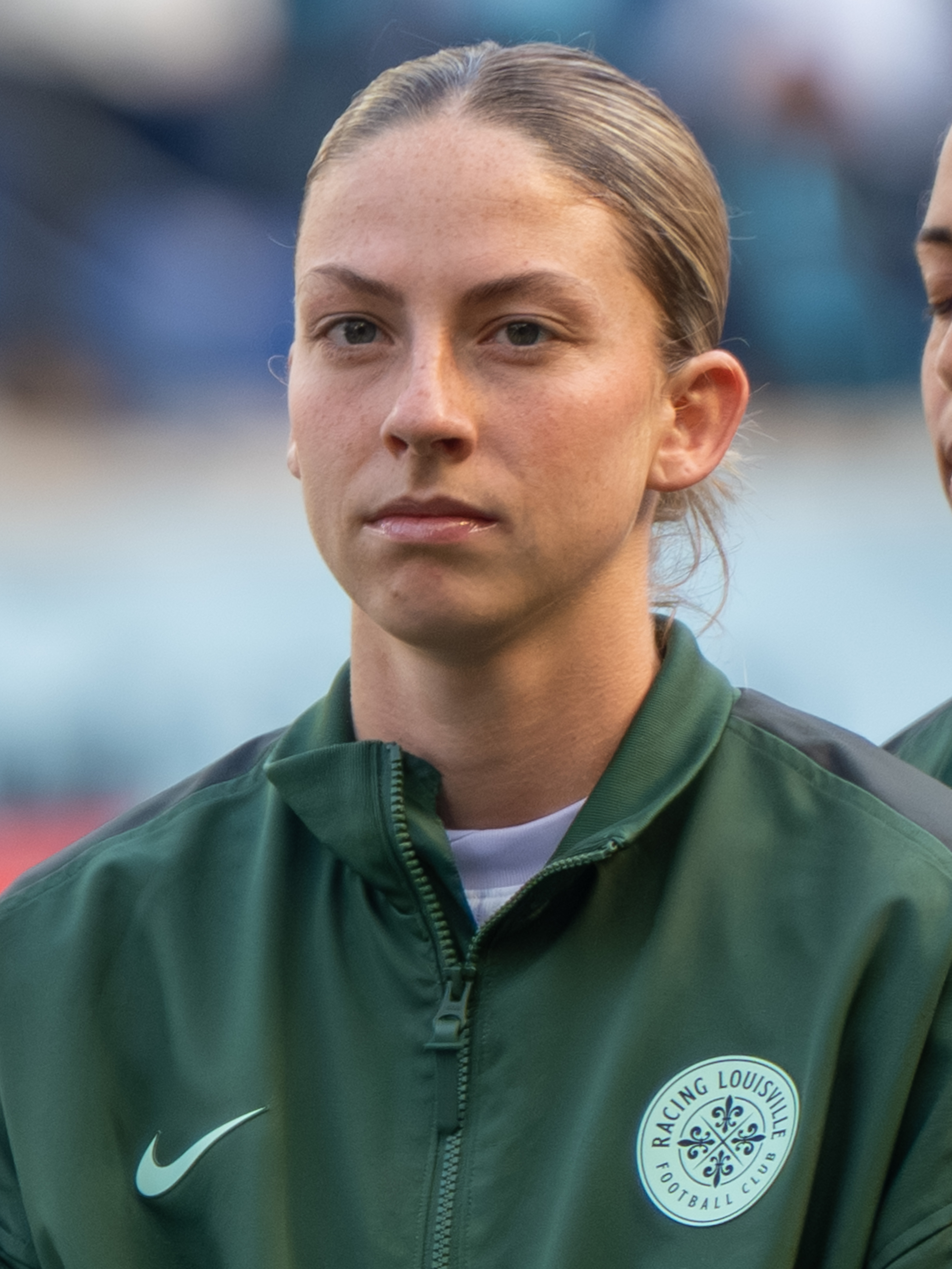
- Hase with Racing Louisville in 2025

Personal information
- Full name: Ella Bleu Hase
- Date of birth: July 12, 2002 (age 24)
- Height: 5 ft 5 in (1.65 m)
- Positions: Left back; winger

Team information
- Current team: North Carolina Courage
- Number: 36

Youth career
- Chicago Inter

College career
Years	Team	Apps	(Gls)
2020–2023	Northwestern Wildcats	71	(14)
2024	Duke Blue Devils	22	(3)

Senior career*
Years	Team	Apps	(Gls)
2025–2026	Racing Louisville	44	(1)
2026–	North Carolina Courage	1	(0)
- * Club domestic league appearances and goals as of 06:52, November 8, 2026 (UTC)

Ella Bleu Hase (born July 12, 2002) is an American professional soccer player who plays as a left back or left winger for the North Carolina Courage of the National Women's Soccer League (NWSL). She played college soccer for the Northwestern Wildcats and the Duke Blue Devils. She began her professional career with Racing Louisville in 2025.

== Early life ==
Hase grew up in Orland Park, Illinois, one of three children born to Rog and Deborah Hase. Her sister, Kylie, played college soccer for Purdue. She played club soccer for Chicago Inter and attended Sandburg High School. In her junior year, she earned all-state honors after scoring 7 goals with 8 assists and helping Sandburg to the sectional finals. Her senior season was cancelled due to the COVID-19 pandemic.

== College career ==
=== Northwestern Wildcats ===
Hase appeared in all 71 games (67 starts) for the Northwestern Wildcats from 2020 to 2023. She was deployed at left back during her first two seasons, starting every game as a freshman and all but four as a sophomore.

As a junior, she moved to the more offensive role of wingback, scoring 4 goals and providing a team-second-high 7 assists, including the winning assist in the quarterfinals of the Big Ten tournament. Northwestern qualified for the 2022 NCAA tournament, where Hase played every minute as the team made the third round before falling to eventual champions UCLA.

She was used further forward in her senior season, leading the team with 10 goals and adding 3 assists, and earned second-team All-Big Ten honors.

=== Duke Blue Devils ===
After four seasons in Evanston, Hale entered the transfer portal and joined the Duke Blue Devils. She appeared in all 22 games (21 starts) in the 2024 season, helping Duke reach the No. 1 national ranking and win the Atlantic Coast Conference (ACC) regular-season title with an unbeaten conference record. She scored 3 goals and jointly led the team with 13 assists (tied with Mia Oliaro), which ranked second in the nation. She had four assists during the NCAA tournament as Duke made the semifinals before being stopped by rivals North Carolina. Hase was named to the All-ACC second team and the NCAA all-tournament team.

== Club career ==
=== Racing Louisville ===
Racing Louisville FC announced on January 16, 2025, that the club had signed Hase to her first professional contract, a two-year deal with an option to extend an additional year. She made her professional debut on March 22, starting and playing the full 90 minutes at left back in a 2–0 loss to Bay FC. She gained a consistent starting role at left winger or midfielder after the summer break. On November 2, she scored her first professional goal in the season finale against Bay FC as Racing won 1–0 to clinch playoffs for the first time in club history.

=== North Carolina Courage ===
On October 8, 2026, Hase was traded to the North Carolina Courage for US$35,000 in intraleague transfer funds, signing a three-year extension with the club through 2029.

== International career ==
Hase was called into camp with the United States under-23 team, training concurrently with the senior national team, in October 2025.

== Career statistics ==
As of March 12, 2025

Appearances and goals by club, season and competition
Club	Season	League			Playoffs		Total	
Club	Season	Division	Apps	Goals	Apps	Goals	Apps	Goals
Racing Louisville FC	2025	NWSL	23	1	1	0	24	1
Career total			23	1	1	0	24	1

== Honors and awards ==
Duke Blue Devils

- Atlantic Coast Conference: 2024

Individual

- Second-team All-ACC: 2024
- Second-team All-Big Ten: 2023
- NCAA tournament all-tournament team: 2024
