= Lauren Milliet =

American soccer player (born 1996)

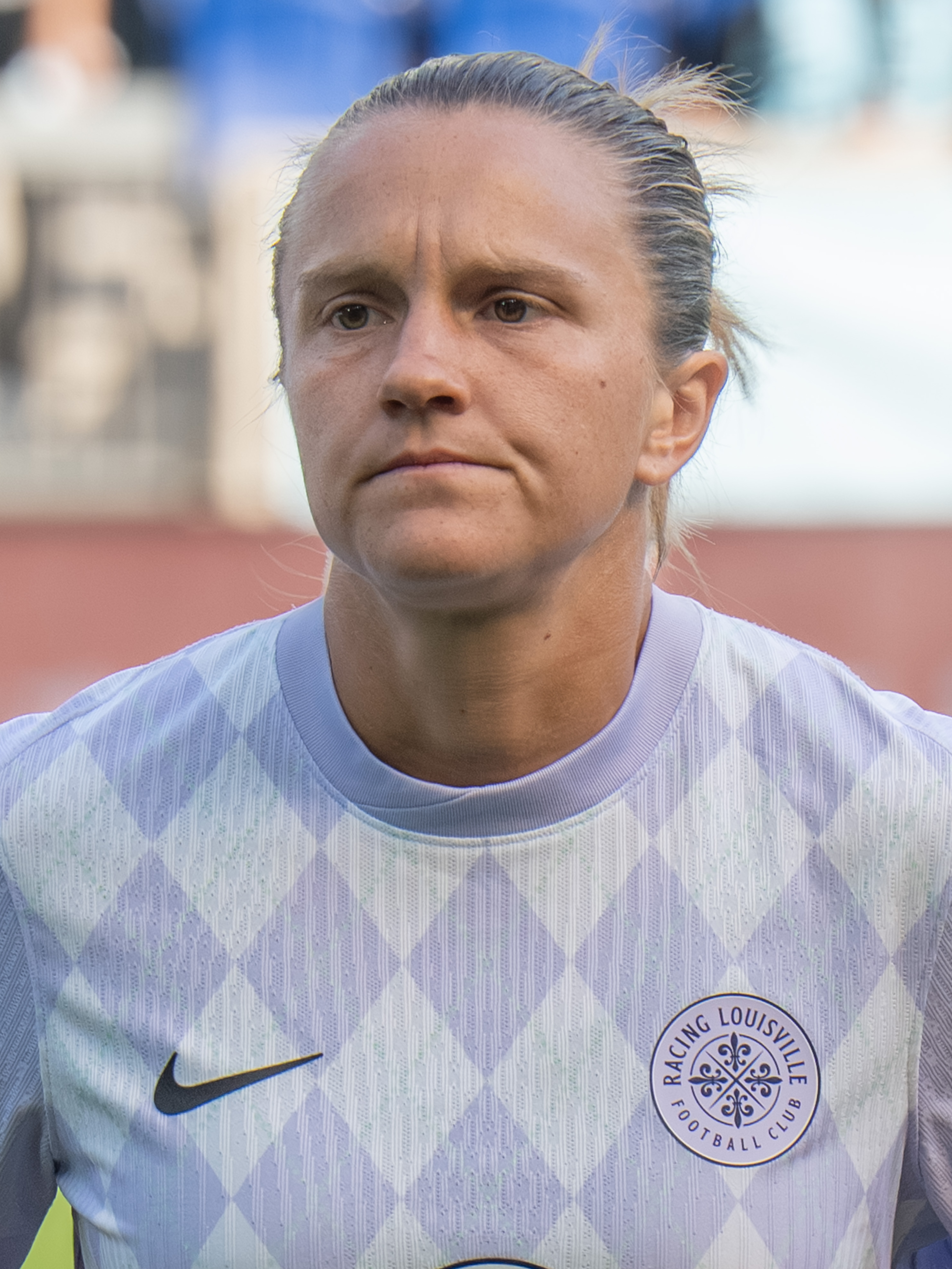
- Milliet with Racing Louisville FC in 2025

Personal information
- Full name: Lauren Milliet
- Date of birth: December 1, 1996 (age 29)
- Place of birth: Durango, Colorado
- Height: 5 ft 1 in (1.55 m)
- Positions: Right back; midfielder

Team information
- Current team: Racing Louisville
- Number: 2

College career
Years	Team	Apps	(Gls)
2015–2018	Colorado College Tigers	77	(21)

Senior career*
Years	Team	Apps	(Gls)
2019–2020	North Carolina Courage	2	(0)
2021–	Racing Louisville	143	(4)
- * Club domestic league appearances and goals as of 05:55, November 2, 2026 (UTC)

Lauren Milliet (born December 1, 1996) is an American professional soccer player who plays as a right back or midfielder for Racing Louisville of the National Women's Soccer League (NWSL). In April 2025, Milliet became the first player in NWSL history to log 100 consecutive matches for one club.

== College career ==
Milliet started in all 77 of her appearances for Colorado College, tallying 21 goals and 16 assists. The midfielder was the 14th overall pick in the 2019 NWSL draft as just the second player to be selected from Colorado College.

== Club career ==
=== North Carolina Courage ===
Milliet was chosen by the North Carolina Courage in the second round with the 14th overall pick in the 2019 NWSL College Draft. Milliet featured in two matches for the Courage in 2019. After the 2020 NWSL regular season was cancelled due to the COVID-19 pandemic, Milliet participated in the 2020 NWSL Challenge Cup and the 2020 NWSL Fall Series. She made her first professional start on July 1 in a 2–0 win over the Washington Spirit.

=== Racing Louisville FC ===
Milliet was chosen by Racing Louisville FC in the 2020 NWSL Expansion Draft. She scored her first goal for the team in a 3–0 win over the Kansas City Current on April 2 in the 2022 NWSL Challenge Cup. On September 8, 2022, Racing announced Milliet had signed a new three-year contract through 2025. In both 2022 and 2023, Milliet was an NWSL Ironwoman, playing every minute of every game for Louisville.

In 2024, the club extended Milliet's contract through the 2026 season. She then signed a new contact with the club before the 2026 season, keeping her in Louisville through 2027 with an option for 2028. As of 2026, she is Racing's all-time appearance leader, and the only player still with the club since its inception.

On April 24, 2026, Milliet scored her first professional brace in a 3–2 victory over the Orlando Pride, contributing to Racing's first win of the year and marking her first time scoring in nearly four years.

== Personal life ==
Milliet married Cameron Stopforth on December 20, 2022.

== Career statistics ==
As of March 12, 2025

Appearances and goals by club, season and competition
Club	Season	League			Playoffs (Note: Includes NWSL Playoffs)		Cup (Note: Includes the NWSL Challenge Cup, NWSL Fall Series, The Women's Cup, and NWSL x Liga MX Femenil Summer Cup)		Total	
Club	Season	Division	Apps	Goals	Apps	Goals	Apps	Goals	Apps	Goals
North Carolina Courage	2019	NWSL	2	0	—		0	0	2	0
North Carolina Courage	2020	NWSL	—		—		8	0	8	0
Racing Louisville FC	2021	NWSL	24	0	—		6	0	30	0
Racing Louisville FC	2022	NWSL	22	1	—		6	1	28	2
Racing Louisville FC	2023	NWSL	22	0	—		8	0	30	0
Racing Louisville FC	2024	NWSL	26	0	—		3	0	29	0
Racing Louisville FC	2025	NWSL	19	0	1	0	1	0	21	0
Career total			115	1	1	0	32	1	148	2
