= Kayla Fischer =

American soccer player (born 2000)

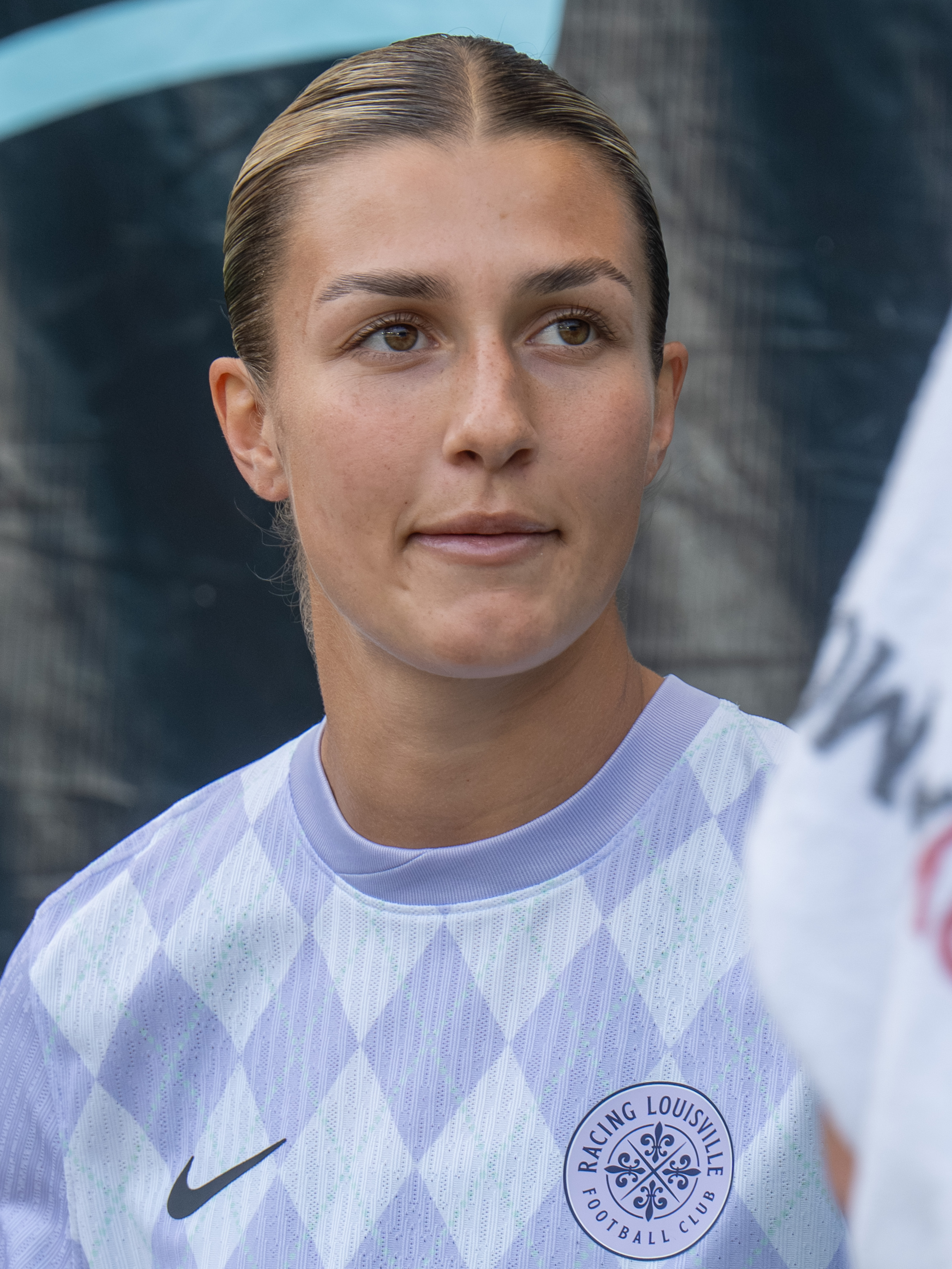
- Fischer with Racing Louisville in 2025

Personal information
- Full name: Kayla Ann Fischer
- Date of birth: January 5, 2000 (age 26)
- Place of birth: Kent, Ohio, US
- Positions: Striker; midfielder

Team information
- Current team: Racing Louisville FC
- Number: 9

Youth career
- Cleveland FC

College career
Years	Team	Apps	(Gls)
2018–2022	Ohio State Buckeyes	84	(28)

Senior career*
Years	Team	Apps	(Gls)
2023–	Racing Louisville FC	85	(12)
- * Club domestic league appearances and goals as of 06:00, November 2, 2026 (UTC)

Kayla Ann Fischer (born January 5, 2000) is an American professional soccer player who plays as a striker or midfielder for Racing Louisville FC of the National Women's Soccer League (NWSL). She played college soccer for the Ohio State Buckeyes and was selected 16th overall by Racing in the 2023 NWSL Draft.

== College career ==
Fischer played five seasons for the Ohio State Buckeyes, totaling 28 goals and 19 assists in 84 appearances. She started 79 games for Ohio State, helping her team reach the NCAA Tournament four times. She was twice named first team All-Big Ten and once third team All-Big Ten. She was also a selection for the All-Big Ten Freshman Team in 2018.

== Club career ==
After her selection in the 2023 NWSL Draft, Fischer signed a two-year contract with Racing Louisville. She made her professional debut in Racing's season-opening 0–0 draw at the Houston Dash and started her first game on April 15 at Angel City. Fischer scored her first goal professional goal on June 14 against the Houston Dash in a 3–0 Challenge Cup group stage win. Fischer finished the 2023 NWSL season with one assist in 10 appearances, including five starts.

In 2024, Fischer made 24 appearances for Racing, starting 12 matches. She was named to the NWSL Team of the Month in August and finished the year having contributed one goal and one assist. On August 15, Racing Louisville announced the club had signed Fischer to a one-year contract extension.

Fischer started 16 matches in 21 regular season appearances in 2025, scoring a career-high three goals and adding three assists. In the club's first-ever playoff appearance, Fischer became the first Louisville player to score in the post-season. Her goal in the 90'+2 minute tied the game at a 1–1 which forced the match into overtime and eventually a penalty kick shootout which saw the Washington Spirit advance to the semifinals. Racing announced on July 1 that Fischer had signed a new contract with the club through the 2027 season.

== Playing style ==
In her first two professional seasons, Fischer played an attacking midfield position, before being moved to a center forward position in 2025. Fischer is known for her aggressive play style, which resulted in a record 10 yellow cards in the 2024 NWSL season, as well as a three game suspension in the 2025 season due to a red card for violent conduct.

== Career statistics ==
As of March 11, 2026

Appearances and goals by club, season and competition
Club	Season	League			Cup (Note: Includes the NWSL Challenge Cup)		Playoffs (Note: Includes NWSL Playoffs)		Total	
Club	Season	Division	Apps	Goals	Apps	Goals	Apps	Goals	Apps	Goals
Racing Louisville FC	2023	NWSL	10	0	7	1	—		17	1
Racing Louisville FC	2024	NWSL	24	1	—		—		24	1
Racing Louisville FC	2025	NWSL	21	3	—		1	1	22	4
Career total			55	4	7	1	1	1	63	6
