= Taylor Flint =

American soccer player (born 1998)

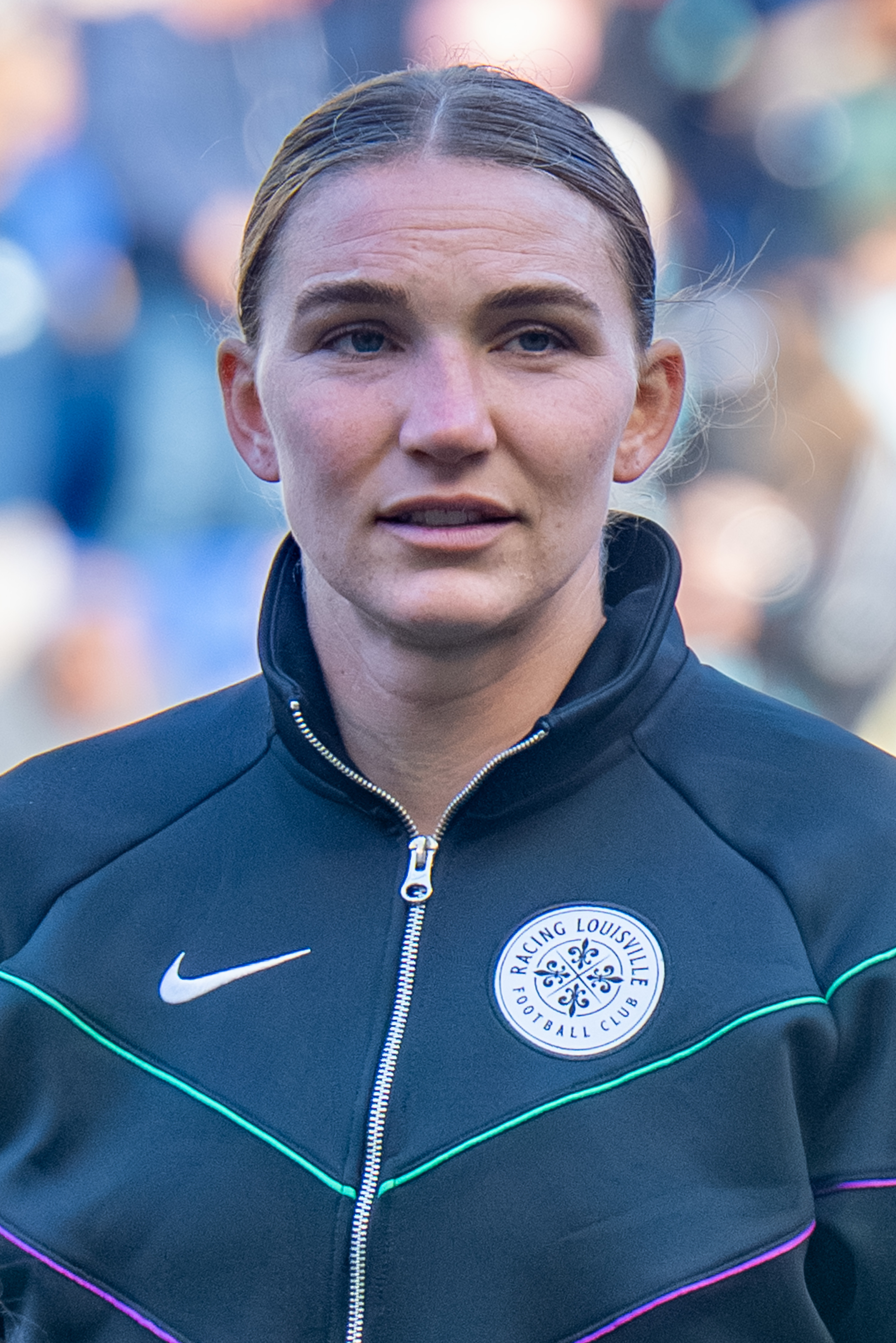
- Flint with Racing Louisville in 2026

Personal information
- Birth name: Taylor Jacklyn Kornieck
- Date of birth: November 22, 1998 (age 27)
- Place of birth: Troy, Michigan, United States
- Height: 6 ft 1 in (1.85 m)
- Position: Defensive midfielder

Team information
- Current team: Racing Louisville FC
- Number: 26

Youth career
- San Diego Surf
- Las Vegas Premier
- Nevada ODP

College career
Years	Team	Apps	(Gls)
2016–2019	Colorado Buffaloes	82	(39)

Senior career*
Years	Team	Apps	(Gls)
2019	LA Galaxy OC	2	(0)
2020–2021	Orlando Pride	22	(2)
2020	→ MSV Duisburg (loan)	10	(1)
2022–2023	San Diego Wave	34	(4)
2024–	Racing Louisville FC	67	(12)

International career
2016	United States U18		
2017–2018	United States U19	5	(1)
2017–2018	United States U20	7	(0)
2022–2023	United States	12	(2)
- * Club domestic league appearances and goals as of 06:08, November 2, 2026 (UTC)

Taylor Jacklyn Flint (née Kornieck; born November 22, 1998) is an American professional soccer player who plays as a defensive midfielder for Racing Louisville FC of the National Women's Soccer League (NWSL). She previously played for San Diego Wave FC and the Orlando Pride. She was the third overall pick of the 2020 NWSL College Draft after playing for the Colorado Buffaloes. She debuted for the United States national team in 2022.

== Early life ==
Born in Troy, Michigan, Flint grew up in Henderson, Nevada, and was a 2015 NSCAA All-American at Coronado High School where she served as team captain and finished her prep career with 84 goals and 44 assists. As a senior, she was named Gatorade Player of the Year for Nevada as she scored 56 goals and led her school to the Division I state championship. A standout high school athlete, Flint also played outside hitter for the school volleyball team and wide receiver for the flag football team. At club level, Flint played soccer for the San Diego Surf and Las Vegas Premier ECNL clubs, captained the Nevada Olympic Development Program team and was selected to the Region IV ODP team in 2015.

=== Colorado Buffaloes ===
Flint was a four-year starter for the Colorado Buffaloes at the University of Colorado Boulder from 2016 to 2019 while also earning a degree in integrative physiology. During her freshman season, Flint scored 11 goals for the Buffaloes in 22 matches, earning the Pac-12 Freshman of the Year award. Following her junior year, Flint became the first All-American for the Buffaloes since 2006, scoring 9 goals in 16 starts. She earned All Pac-12 honors every year of her collegiate career. Flint left Colorado as the program's all-time leader in points (102) and assists (24).

During the 2019 college offseason, Flint joined UWS club LA Galaxy OC, making two appearances as the team won the National Championship.

== Club career ==
=== Orlando Pride (2020–2021) ===
On January 16, 2020, Flint was selected with the third overall pick in the 2020 NWSL College Draft by Orlando Pride who traded up during the draft in order to select her. Flint became the highest draft selection in Orlando Pride history. On February 11, 2020, she signed a one-year contract with an option for an additional year. With preseason and the ensuing NWSL schedule canceled in March due to the coronavirus pandemic, the NWSL eventually scheduled a smaller 2020 NWSL Challenge Cup replacement tournament in June. However, on June 22, Orlando Pride withdrew from the tournament following positive COVID-19 tests among both players and staff.

Flint returned to Orlando following her loan spell ahead of the 2021 season, making her professional NWSL debut for the club on April 10, 2021, starting and scoring a 44th-minute equalizer in the team's Challenge Cup opener against Racing Louisville.

==== MSV Duisburg (2020) ====
In September 2020, having been unable to play for Orlando, Flint joined German Bundesliga club MSV Duisburg on loan for the rest of the year. She made her debut on September 11, 2020, starting in a 2–0 defeat to Bayer Leverkusen. On October 31 she made her DFB-Pokal Frauen debut in a second round match against third-tier team Borussia Bocholt. She received a straight red card for serious foul play in the 38th minute and later handed a four-game ban by the German FA. She scored her first goal on November 14 in a 5–3 defeat to Werder Bremen.

=== San Diego Wave FC (2022–2023) ===
On January 18, 2022, Flint was traded with the rights to Emily van Egmond to San Diego Wave FC in exchange for $125,000 in allocation money and San Diego's natural second-round pick in the 2024 NWSL Draft.

In two seasons with the club, Flint totaled four goals and three assists in 34 appearances, helping the Wave win the 2023 NWSL Shield and become the first expansion team to make the playoffs in its first year in 2022.

=== Racing Louisville FC (2024–present) ===
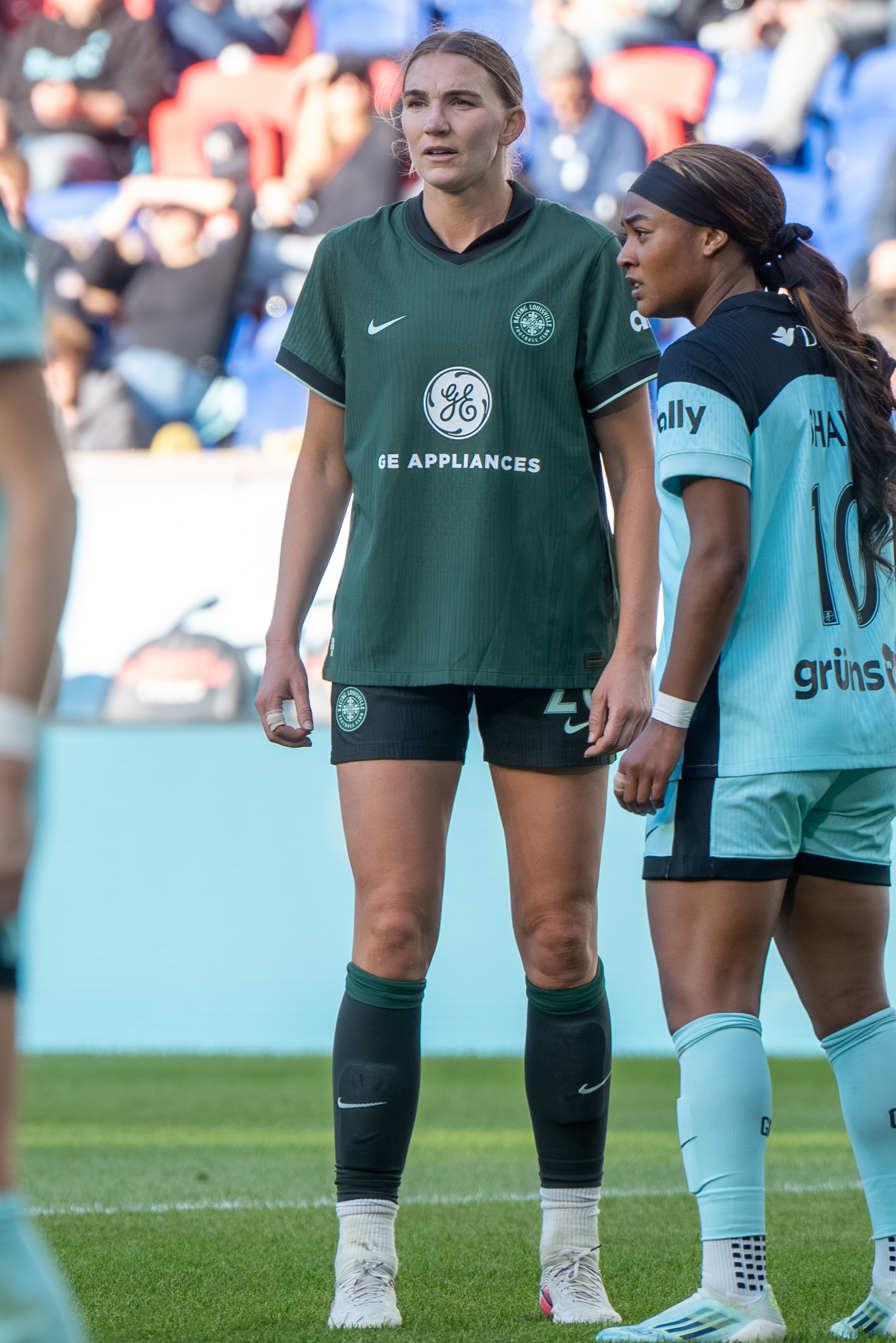
Taylor Flint with Racing Louisville in 2026

On January 22, 2024, Flint was traded to Racing Louisville FC for $150,000 in allocation money. In Louisville, Flint transitioned from an attacking midfield role to a defensive midfield position. In the 2024 season, Flint started 24 games, recorded three goals and one assist, and led the league in tackles won, aerial duels won, and interceptions. She was named to the March/April NWSL Team of the Month.

In 2025, Flint led the league in interceptions and aerial duels won for the second straight year. Flint started all 23 regular-season matches she appeared in, scoring a career-high four goals and providing one assist. She was named to the NWSL team of the month in both May and August. Flint was suspended for one match in September due to yellow card accumulation. She played 120 minutes in Louisville's first-ever playoff appearance, a 1–1 draw that saw the Washington Spirit advance to the semifinals 3–1 on penalty kicks. At the conclusion of the season, Flint was named to the 2025 NWSL Best XI Second Team. On July 15, Racing announced Flint had signed a new contract to extend her time in Louisville through the 2028 season.

== International career ==
=== Youth ===
Flint has represented the United States at under-18, under-19 and under-20 levels. In 2016, she served as the team captain for the under-18 side. Flint scored her first international goal with the under-19s in July 2017 in a 2–0 win over England. In 2018, Flint was called up for the La Manga U20 tournament but was forced to withdraw through injury.

=== Senior ===
In June 2022, Flint received her first senior international call-up. At 6'1", she became the tallest player in the program's history to earn a cap with the national team. She made her United States debut on June 25, 2022, entering as a 73rd-minute substitute and scoring in the 90th minute in a 3–0 friendly win over Colombia. Flint scored her second international goal in a 5–0 win over New Zealand when she headed in a Rose Lavelle corner at the 80th minute.

== Personal life ==
Taylor's mother, Kristin, played professional volleyball in Europe. Her older brother, Nick, played basketball collegiately for Doane Tigers and CSU Dominguez Hills Toros.

Formerly Taylor Kornieck, she married Bailey Flint and began using her married name in 2024.

== Career statistics ==
=== College ===
Team	Season	Pac-12 regular season			NCAA Tournament		Total	
Team	Season	Division	Apps	Goals	Apps	Goals	Apps	Goals
Colorado Buffaloes	2016	Div. I	20	11	2	0	22	11
Colorado Buffaloes	2017	Div. I	20	6	2	1	22	7
Colorado Buffaloes	2018	Div. I	16	9	—		16	9
Colorado Buffaloes	2019	Div. I	20	11	2	1	22	12
Total			76	37	6	2	82	39

=== Club ===
As of match played August 28, 2026

Appearances and goals by club, season and competition
Club	Season	League			National cup (Note: Includes DFB-Pokal, NWSL Challenge Cup)		Playoffs (Note: Includes NWSL Playoffs)		Other		Total	
Club	Season	Division	Apps	Goals	Apps	Goals	Apps	Goals	Apps	Goals	Apps	Goals
LA Galaxy OC	2019	UWS	2	0	—		—		—		2	0
Orlando Pride	2020	NWSL	—		—		—		—		0	0
Orlando Pride	2021	NWSL	22	2	4	1	—		—		26	3
Orlando Pride	Total		22	2	4	1	—		—		26	3
MSV Duisburg (loan)	2020–21	Bundesliga	10	1	1	0	—		—		11	1
San Diego Wave FC	2022	NWSL	18	3	6	1	2	1	—		26	5
San Diego Wave FC	2023	NWSL	16	1	5	1	1	0	—		22	2
San Diego Wave FC	Total		34	4	11	2	3	1	—		48	7
Racing Louisville FC	2024	NWSL	24	3	—		—		3 (Note: Appearances in NWSL x Liga MX Femenil Summer Cup)	0	27	3
Racing Louisville FC	2025	NWSL	23	4	—		1	0	2 (Note: WCU)	0	26	4
Racing Louisville FC	2026	NWSL	20	5	—		—		0	0	20	5
Racing Louisville FC	Total		67	12	—		1	0	5	0	73	12
Career total			135	19	16	3	4	1	5	0	160	23

=== International ===
As of match played February 22, 2023

Appearances and goals by national team and year
National team	Year	Apps	Goals
United States	2022	7	1
United States	2023	5	1
Total		12	2

Scores and results list United States's goal tally first, score column indicates score after each Flint goal.

List of international goals scored by Taylor Flint
No.	Date	Venue	Opponent	Score	Result	Competition	Ref.
1	June 25, 2022	Commerce City, Colorado, United States	Colombia	3–0	3–0	Friendly	
2	January 21, 2023	Auckland, New Zealand	New Zealand	5–0	5–0	Friendly	

== Honors ==
LA Galaxy OC

- UWS National Championship: 2019

San Diego Wave

- NWSL Shield: 2023

Racing Louisville

- The Women's Cup: 2025

United States

- CONCACAF Women's Championship: 2022
- SheBelieves Cup: 2023

Individual

- Pac-12 Freshman of the Year: 2016
- NWSL Second XI: 2025
