= Allie George =

American soccer player (born 2003)

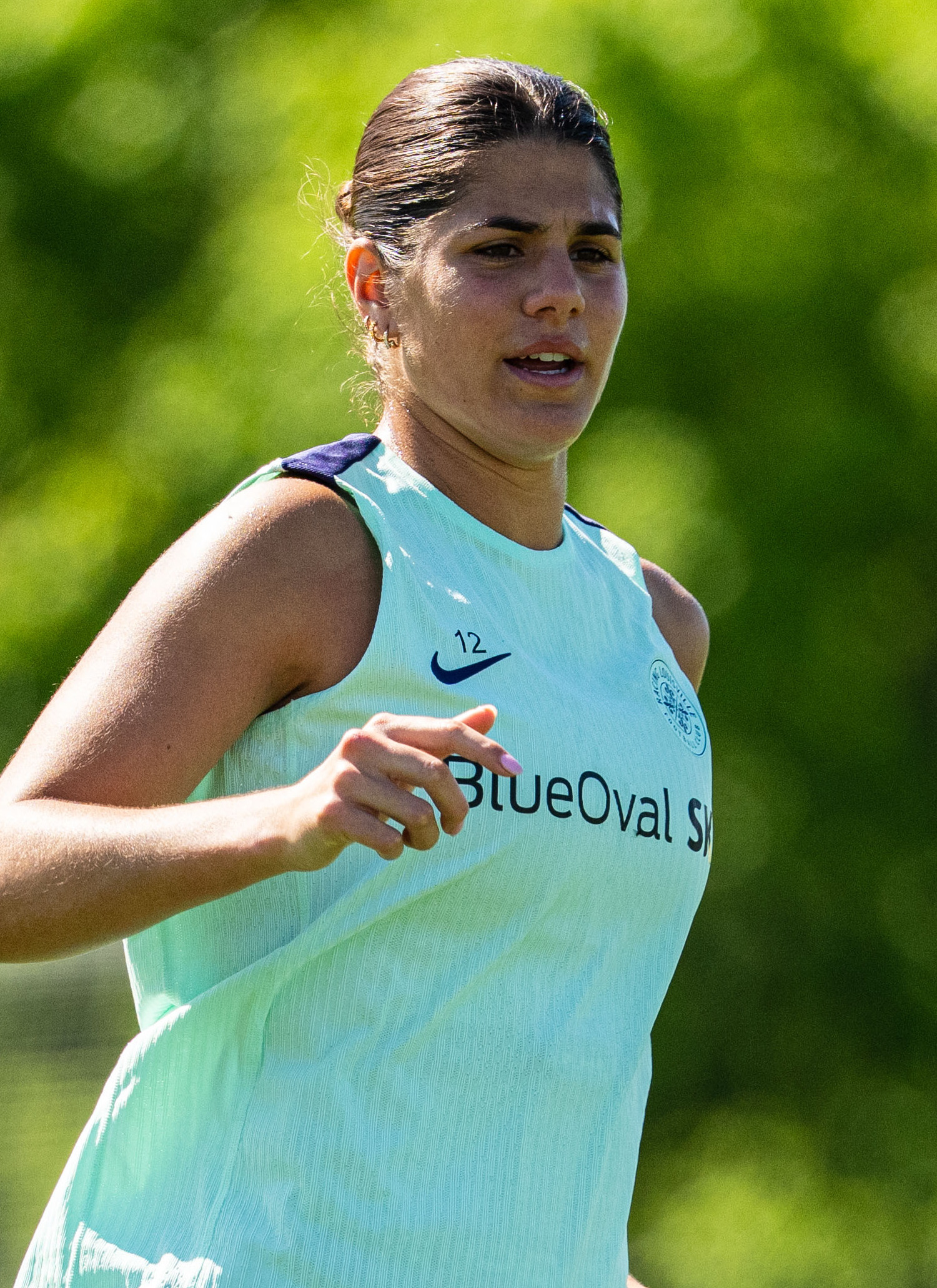
- George with Racing Louisville in 2025

Personal information
- Full name: Allie Suzanne George
- Date of birth: March 25, 2003 (age 23)
- Place of birth: Louisville, Kentucky, U.S.
- Height: 5 ft 11 in (1.80 m)
- Position: Right back

Team information
- Current team: Querétaro
- Number: 16

Youth career
- 2011–2020: Javanon FC
- 2017–2020: Sacred Heart Valkyries

College career
| Years | Team | Apps | (Gls) |
| 2021–2024 | Virginia Tech Hokies | 77 | (6) |

Senior career*
| Years | Team | Apps | (Gls) |
| 2022–2024 | Racing Louisvile (USL W) | 23 | (1) |
| 2025 | Racing Louisville | 0 | (0) |
| 2025 | → Fort Lauderdale United (loan) | 4 | (0) |
| 2026– | Querétaro | 3 | (1) |
- * Club domestic league appearances and goals as of August 17, 2026

Allie Suzanne George (born March 25, 2003) is an American professional soccer player who plays as a right back for Liga Femenil club Querétaro. She played college soccer for the Virginia Tech Hokies. She began her professional career with hometown club Racing Louisville in 2025, though never made a competitive appearance for them.

== Early life ==
George was born and raised in Louisville, Kentucky, the youngest of three children born to Cris and Kittie George. She attended Sacred Heart Academy, where she played forward or defender on the soccer team all four years, leading them to the Kentucky state championship and being named first-team all-state in 2020. She played club soccer for Javanon FC for ten years. She committed to Virginia Tech as a senior.

== College career ==
George was a rotation player for the Virginia Tech Hokies during her first two seasons, scoring 2 goals in 38 appearances with 5 starts. She took on a bigger role as a junior and started all 18 games in 2023. She recorded career high as a senior in 2024, scoring 4 goals with 2 assists in 21 starts. She played every minute of four rounds of the NCAA tournament, providing the winning assist against UCLA and scoring the lone goal against Iowa, as Virginia Tech reached the quarterfinals for the second time in program history. During college, she also played three summer seasons with Racing Louisville's USL W League side.

== Club career ==
On January 20, 2025, George signed her first professional contract with Racing Louisville on a one-year deal. In July, she made her only appearance for the club in their friendly against USL Super League club Lexington SC.

On August 12, 2025, Racing announced that George would join USL Super League club Fort Lauderdale United on loan for the rest of the season. She made her professional league debut on August 23, playing the entire match in United's season-opening 3–3 draw with Lexington SC. After four appearances and two starts, she was recalled to Racing on September 18.

In April 2026, George trained with the NWSL's Bay FC before their friendly against the Ottawa Rapid.

On June 15, 2026, it was announced that George had signed with Liga MX Femenil club Querétaro. She debuted for the club in their season-opening 3–1 loss to Guadalajara. On August 17, she scored her first professional goal in a 1–0 victory over Club León.
