= Lynn Family Stadium =

Soccer-specific stadium in Louisville, Kentucky, United States

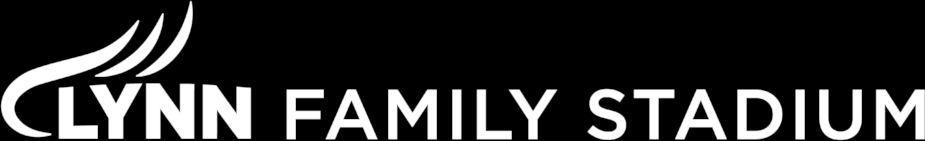

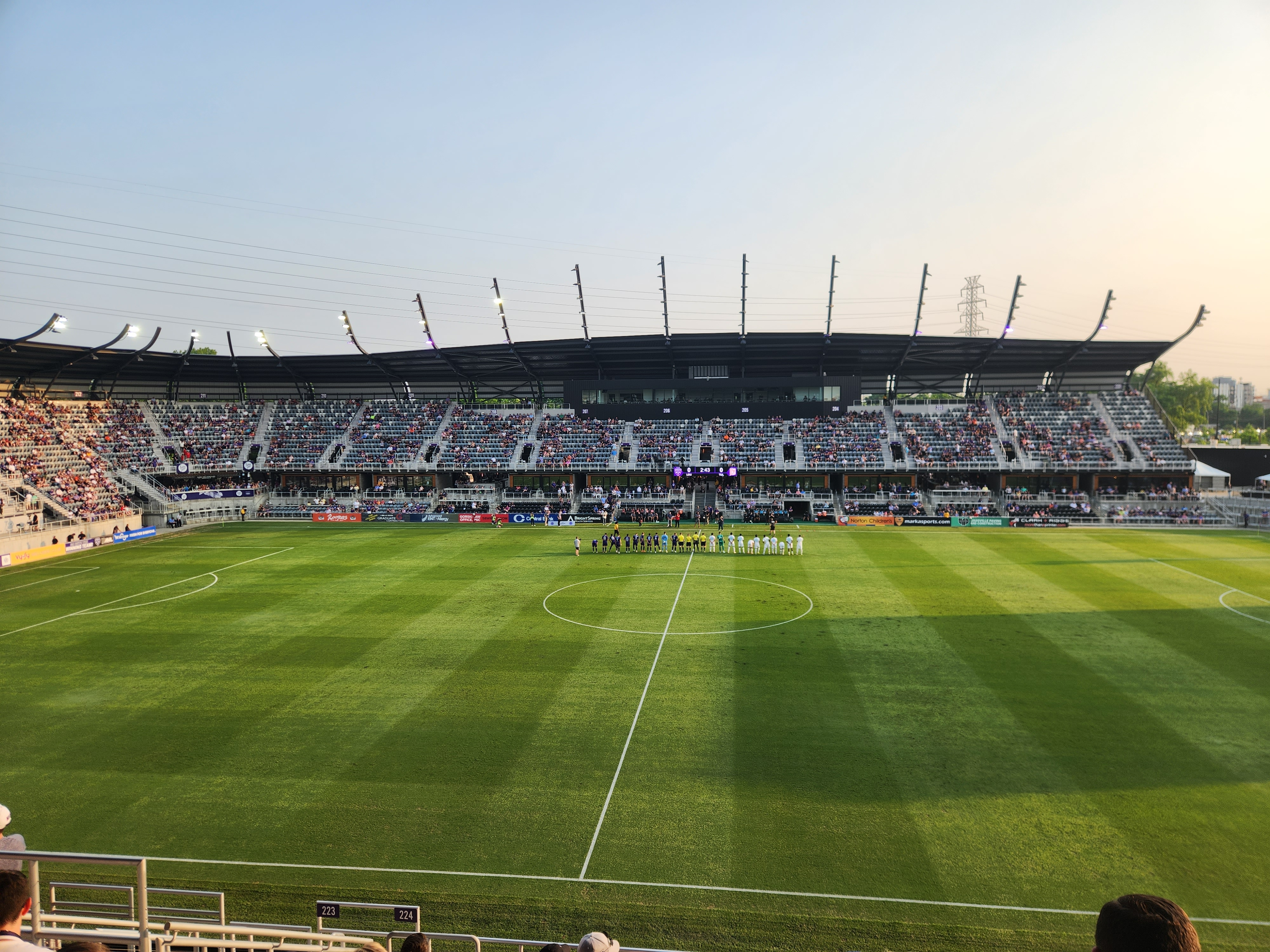
- Louisville City match in 2023

- Location in Kentucky Location in the United States
- Address: 350 Adams Street
- Location: Louisville, Kentucky, U.S.
- Coordinates: 38°15′34″N 85°43′55″W
- Owner: Soccer Holdings, LLC
- Operator: Soccer Holdings, LLC
- Capacity: 11,700 seated, 15,304 with standing room
- Type: Soccer-specific stadium
- Surface: Bermuda and ryegrass mix
- Record attendance: 14,673 (Soccer; Louisville City FC vs. Tampa Bay Rowdies; August 12, 2022)

Construction
- Groundbreaking: June 28, 2018
- Opened: July 12, 2020
- Cost: $65 million
- Architect: HOK
- General contractor: Messer-Harmon JV

Tenants
- Louisville City FC (USLC) (2020–present); Racing Louisville FC (NWSL) (2021–present); Louisville Kings (UFL) (2026–present)

Website
- lynnfamilystadium.com

Lynn Family Stadium is a soccer-specific stadium in the Butchertown neighborhood of Louisville, Kentucky, United States. It has been home to Louisville City FC of the USL Championship (USLC) since its opening in 2020, along with the National Women's Soccer League (NWSL) side Racing Louisville FC since 2021, and the United Football League (UFL) Louisville Kings since 2026. With a capacity of 11,700, the design of the stadium allows expansion up to 15,304 spectators. Breaking ground in 2018, naming-rights were acquired by local business leader Mark Lynn shortly after.

== Development ==
=== Planning and financing ===
Louisville City FC was founded in 2014 as the successor to Orlando City SC, which had moved to Major League Soccer (MLS) and left an open slot in USL Pro (later the USL Championship). The team began play in 2015 at Louisville Slugger Field, a minor league baseball park, but expressed interest in building a soccer-specific stadium after reaching attendance goals. As part of the shared five-year arrangement at Slugger Field, Louisville City FC paid for minor renovations, including a retractable pitchers mound designed by the original team owner Wayne Estopinal, and a rental fee of $5,000 per match. The new team drew an average attendance of over 6,000 fans the inaugural season, second among teams in the USL. However, they were unable to generate revenue as a secondary tenant at Slugger Field due to unexpected expenses.

In August 2015, high-level talks with Mayor Greg Fischer concerning stadium planning began as the club also explored bidding for an MLS franchise. Estopinal and Metro Councilman Dan Johnson proposed a site at Champions Park, a former country club northeast of downtown, for a stadium that would initially seat 10,000 spectators and expand to 20,000 for an MLS team. The city government announced a stadium feasibility and financing study in January 2016, examining four sites in Louisville. The study was completed in August and recommended a 10,000-seat stadium that would cost $30–50 million depending on the mix of public and private funds, but did not name potential sites. The club appointed John Neace as chairman and operating manager in September 2016, with a focus on planning for the stadium. In a December interview with The Courier-Journal, he revealed that the club had been actively acquiring property at a proposed site and were negotiating a public–private partnership to fund the project.

The club hired HOK as the architect for the stadium project, which would also include a mixed-use development with offices and retail, in January 2017. On April 12, 2017, Louisville City FC announced its intention to build a 10,000-seat stadium on a 40-acre (16 ha) industrial site in the Butchertown neighborhood east of Downtown Louisville. The stadium and surrounding development would cost a total of $200 million to construct, including financing assistance from the state government. In September, Mayor Fischer announced a $30 million financing plan from the city that would buy the necessary parcels at the stadium site and contribute to infrastructure improvements. The financing plan was approved by the Metro Council the following month, along with an application to the state government for tax increment financing for the surrounding development.

Property acquisition of the four parcels that comprise the stadium site was completed in November 2018 at a cost of $24.1 million. The tax increment financing proposal was approved by the state government in May 2018, allowing for $21.7 million in financing over a 20-year period within a special district created by the Kentucky Economic Development Finance Authority. The club was criticized by a councilmember during early planning for removing a homeless camp at the stadium site in February 2018; the club ownership donated funds to a homeless advocacy group to house the displaced residents in hotels for two months.

=== Design and construction ===
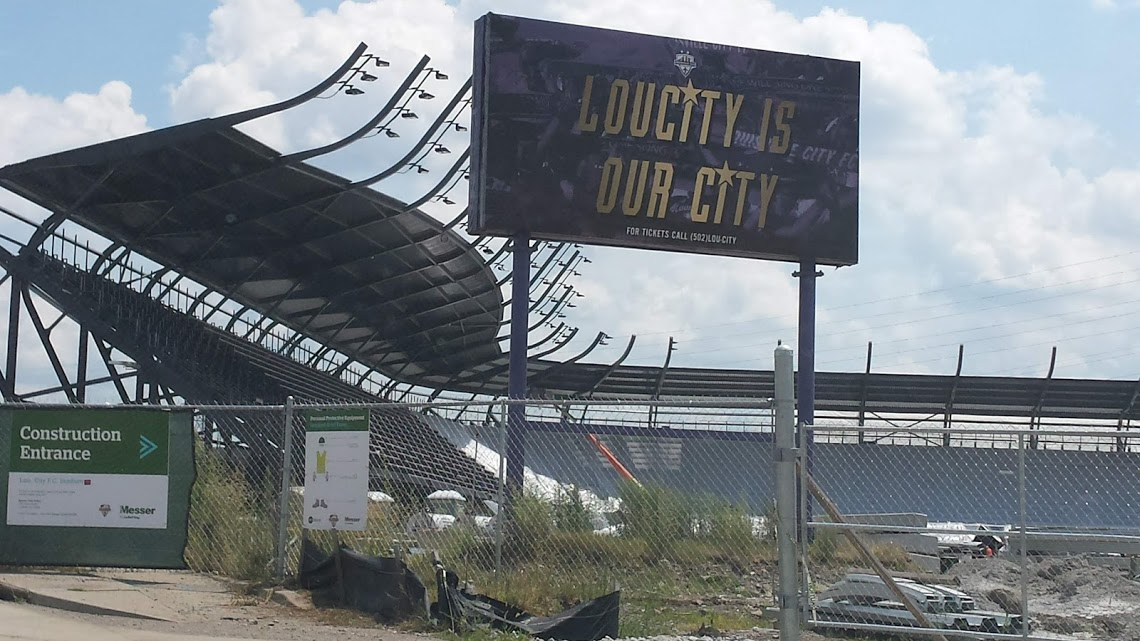
Under construction in 2019

HOK designed the stadium and drew inspiration from other venues, including PayPal Park in San Jose, California, Rio Tinto Stadium in Sandy, Utah, and Little Caesars Arena in Detroit. The roof's exterior-facing façade was designed to resemble a bourbon barrel. The stadium was designed to offer sightlines for fans inside the venue, while also improving the cityscape from outside.

In its initial configuration, Lynn Family Stadium has 11,700 seats, a Premier Club area with 250 seats, and 18 luxury suite boxes. The stadium's total capacity is 15,304 spectators with a safe standing area for supporters' groups and would be expandable to 20,000 with additional construction. The stands enclose three sides of the field, with the open end facing west towards prominent downtown bridges spanning the Ohio River; the open end also has a 40-by-72.5-foot (12.2 by 22.1 m) video board made by Daktronics, one of eight digital displays at the stadium.

The original playing surface was Bermuda grass sod that was grown in Indiana and maintained with an underheating element. Forced to initially re-sod too often, grow lights were later added for a Bermuda and ryegrass blend.

The club and city government hosted a groundbreaking ceremony for the project on June 28, 2018, which included the ownership group, Kentucky governor Matt Bevin, and Louisville mayor Greg Fischer. The stadium was originally estimated to cost $45 million but costs rose to $60–65 million at the time of the groundbreaking. A joint venture of Messer Construction and Harmon Construction was selected as the general contractor for the stadium project in November 2018. By May 2019, work on the roof structure was two-thirds complete and the lower levels of the stadium were in place. The structural steel elements of the stadium were completed in July ahead of work on the grass surface, which was installed in September. Construction was completed in early March, with a formal handover ceremony as Louisville City FC (Soccer Holdings, LLC) took possession of the stadium.

=== Contracts and naming rights ===
On August 5, 2019, Louisville City FC announced that the stadium would be named Lynn Family Stadium for Dr. Mark and Cindy Lynn, who had purchased the ten-year naming rights for an undisclosed amount. Dr. Lynn, an optometrist, owned the Louisville-area franchise of the national optical retailer Visionworks, formerly known as Dr Bizer's Vision World. The Lynns had also donated to the University of Louisville for construction of a collegiate soccer stadium named Dr. Mark & Cindy Lynn Stadium, which opened in 2014 and was designed by Estopinal. The stadium's roof-affixed floodlight masts, which display a multicolored light show after goals, are intended to resemble eyelashes.

The stadium is managed by AEG Facilities.

== Tenants and events ==
=== Louisville City FC ===
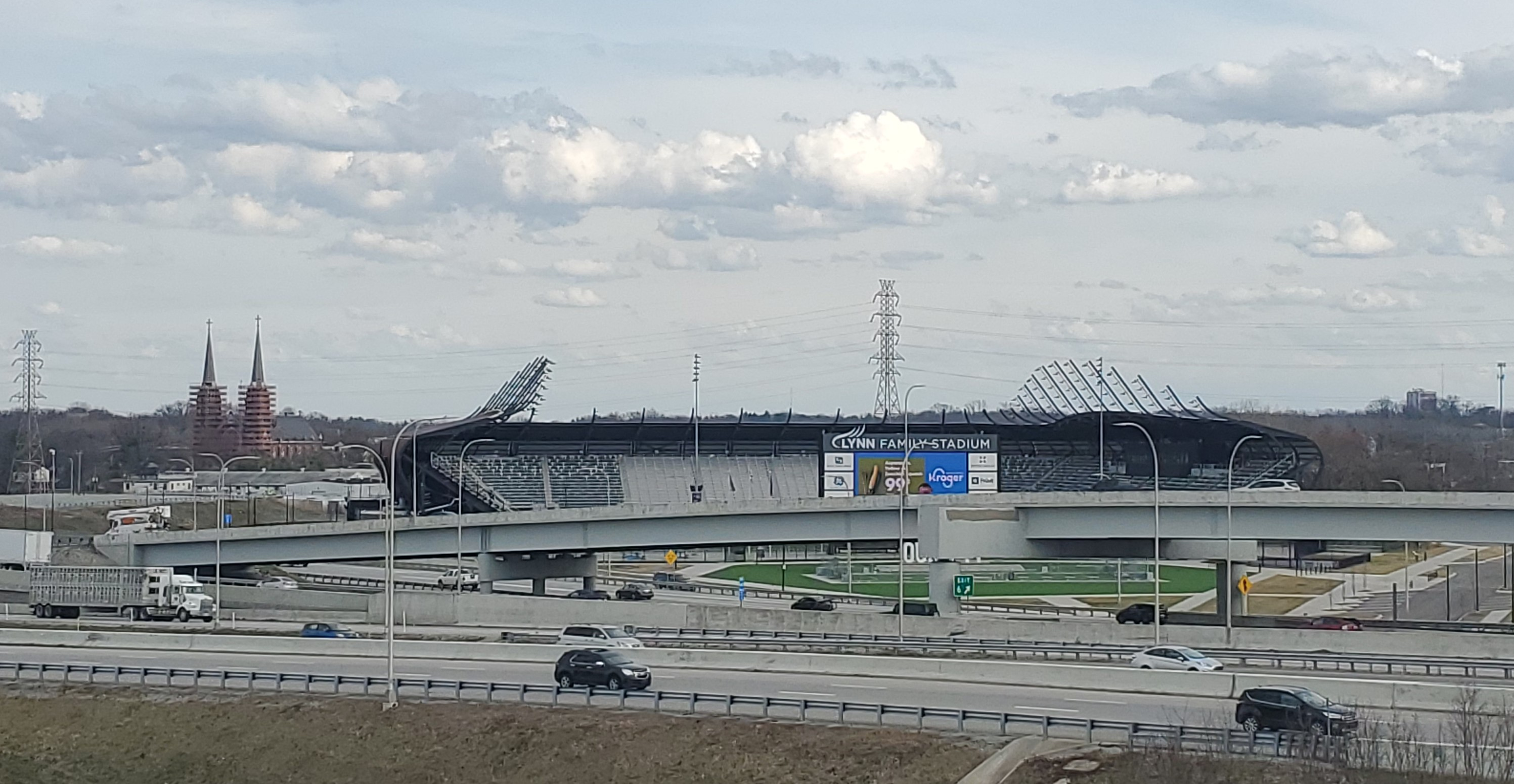
Lynn Family Stadium, as seen from the Big Four Bridge in 2021

Lynn Family Stadium was scheduled to open on April 11, 2020, with a regular season match between Louisville City FC and Birmingham Legion FC. A fixture for Louisville City FC in the 2020 U.S. Open Cup was also scheduled on April 7. The home opener and cup fixture were cancelled by the suspension of USL and U.S. Open Cup play announced in March 2020 because of the COVID-19 pandemic. The opening date was pushed to July 12, 2020, with a home match against the Pittsburgh Riverhounds SC and capacity limited to 30 percent (4,600 spectators).

During the 2021 regular season, the team earned a 10–1–1 home record.

=== Racing Louisville FC ===
In October 2019, the NWSL awarded an expansion franchise to Louisville (later named Racing Louisville FC) that would begin play at Lynn Family Stadium in 2021. The stadium hosted the 2021 NWSL Championship on November 20, 2021, after the match was moved from Portland's Providence Park.

On October 30, 2024, the venue hosted its first United States Women's National Team friendly match against the Argentina Women's National Team. The USWNT won the match 3–0 in front of an announced sold-out crowd of 13,543. Racing Louisville FC's own Emma Sears started the match.

=== Louisville Kings ===
On October 7, 2025, the United Football League (UFL) announced that a new team, the Louisville Kings, will begin play in the stadium in spring 2026.

On March 27, 2026, the venue hosted the Kings' first game against the Birmingham Stallions. The Kings lost 15–13.

=== Music ===
The venue's first concert was on May 8, 2022, when Janet Jackson performed with a stage and temporary floor area specially designed to protect the turf.
