= Savannah DeMelo =

American soccer player (born 1998)

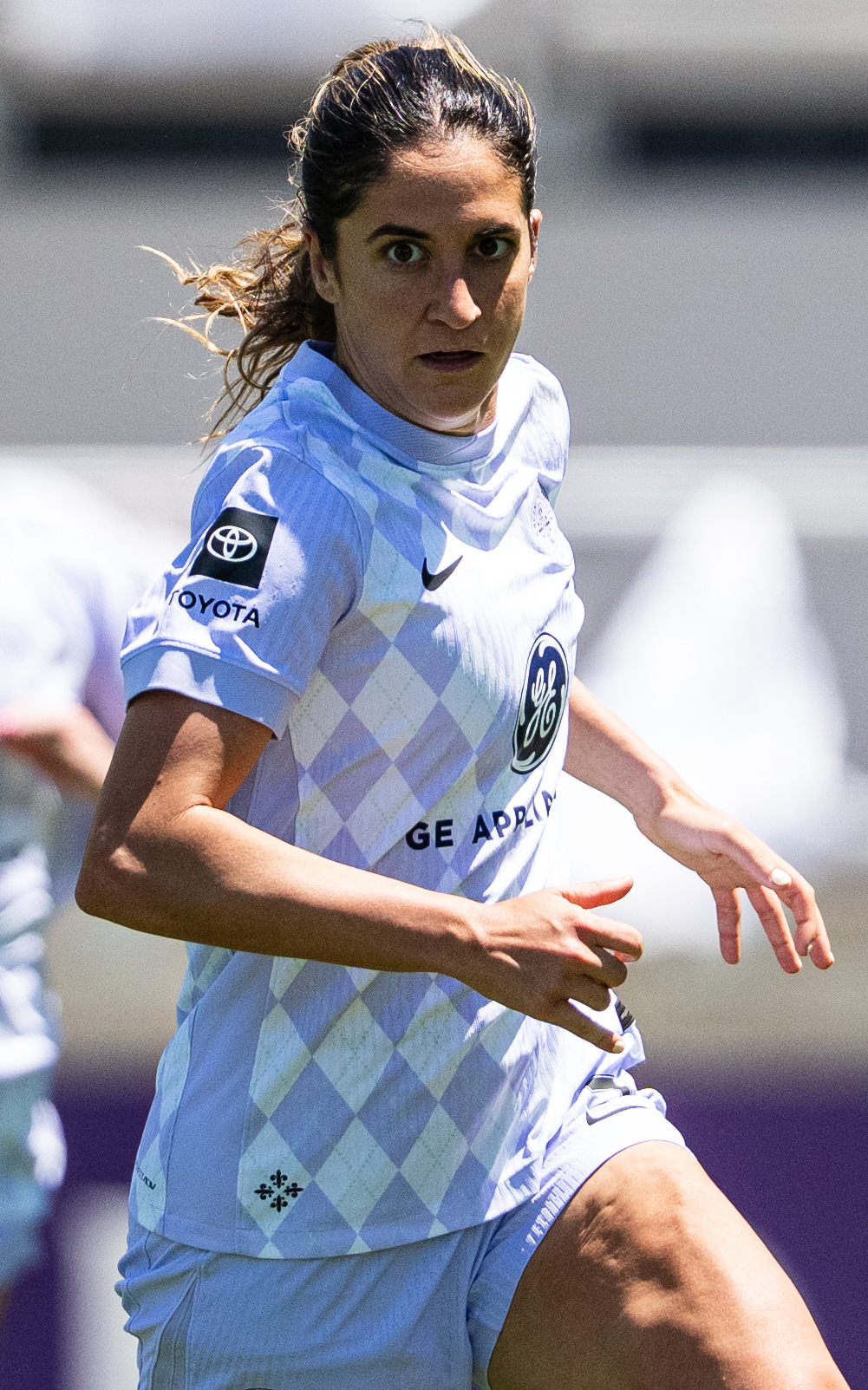
- DeMelo with Racing Louisville FC in 2025

Personal information
- Full name: Savannah Marie DeMelo
- Date of birth: March 26, 1998 (age 28)
- Place of birth: Bellflower, California, U.S.
- Height: 5 ft 5 in (1.65 m)
- Position: Midfielder

Team information
- Current team: Racing Louisville
- Number: 7

College career
Years	Team	Apps	(Gls)
2016–2021	USC Trojans	75	(17)

Senior career*
Years	Team	Apps	(Gls)
2022–	Racing Louisville	81	(17)

International career^{‡}
2016–2018	United States U20	21	(6)
2023–	United States	7	(0)
- * Club domestic league appearances and goals as of 06:06, November 2, 2026 (UTC) ‡ National team caps and goals as of December 2, 2023

Savannah Marie DeMelo (born March 26, 1998) is an American professional soccer player who plays as a midfielder for Racing Louisville FC of the National Women's Soccer League (NWSL). She was the fourth pick in the 2022 NWSL Draft after playing collegiately for the USC Trojans. She debuted for the United States national team at the 2023 FIFA Women's World Cup.

== College career ==
DeMelo played five years at the University of Southern California, making 75 appearances and tallying 17 goals and 28 assists for the Trojans. A regular starter over her college career, DeMelo was a three-time All-Pac-12 selection, including All-Freshman team honors in 2017. As a sophomore in 2018, DeMelo scored nine goals and assisted 10 others en route to United Soccer Coaches All-American honors. DeMelo missed her junior season because of a torn Achilles' tendon, but she successfully returned to action as a senior, starting all 14 games. USC reached the NCAA Tournament in each of the five years DeMelo played for the Trojans.

== Club career ==
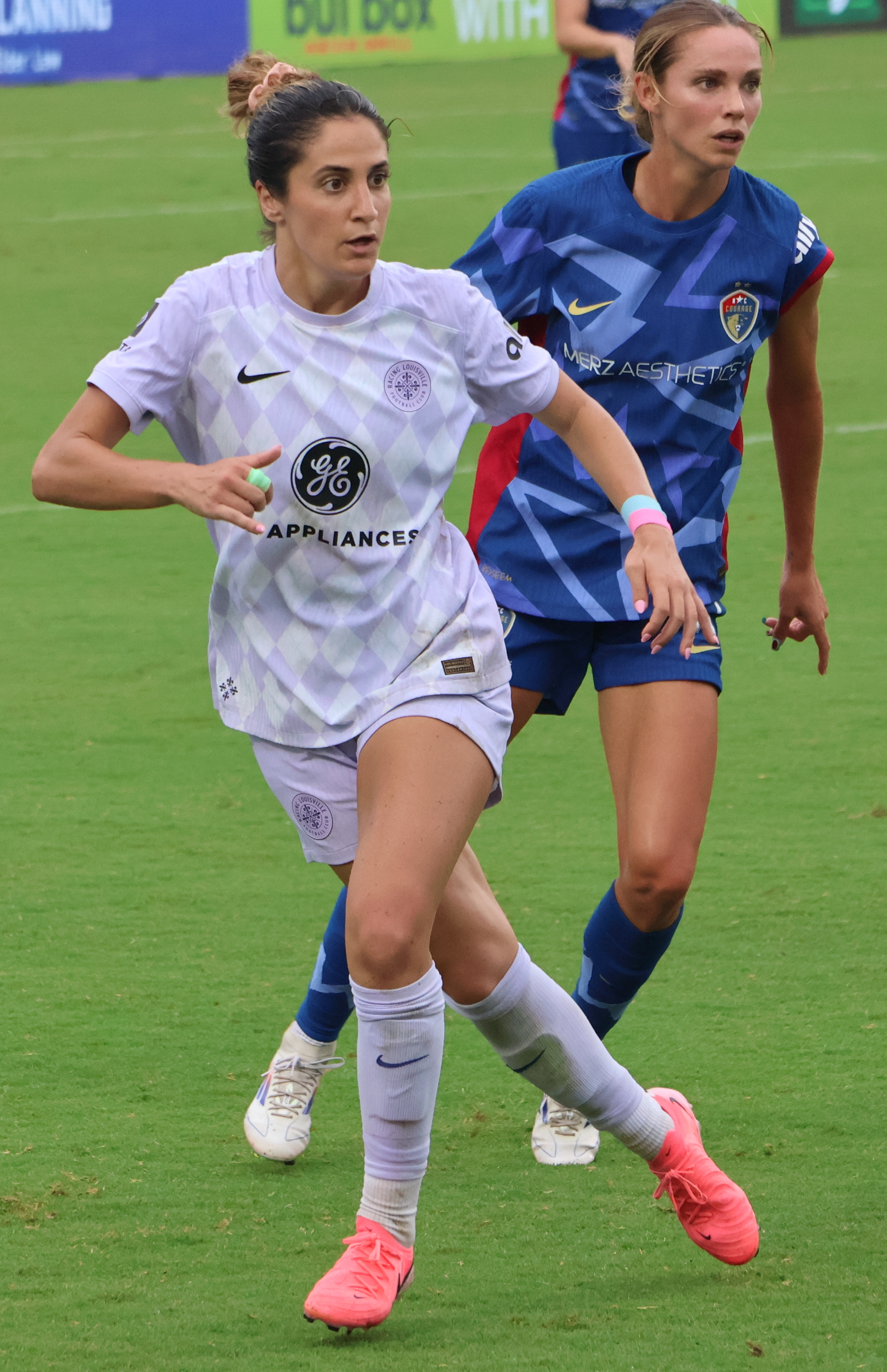
DeMelo playing for Racing in 2024

Racing Louisville selected DeMelo with the fourth pick in the 2022 NWSL Draft, two spots after the club selected fellow midfielder Jaelin Howell. DeMelo made her professional debut on March 25, playing 11 minutes off the bench against the Houston Dash in Racing's second game of the 2022 NWSL Challenge Cup. She started for the first time on April 2 in a 3–0 win against the Kansas City Current. DeMelo started every Racing match in the 2022 NWSL season, scoring four goals and assisting two while leading the league in scoring chances created and fouls won. DeMelo's first professional goal, a game-winning direct free kick against San Diego Wave FC on May 18, 2022, was featured on ESPN's SportsCenter Top 10.

In 2023, DeMelo had 12 goal involvements across all competitions, scoring five and assisting two in league play. She was named to the 2023 NWSL Challenge Cup All-Tournament Team and the NWSL Player of the Month for May. She twice made the league's Team of the Month.

On 14 September 2025, she collapsed during a game against Seattle Reign. The club later said she was 'stable and alert". It was later revealed that DeMelo had suffered a cardiac event on the field.

== International career ==
DeMelo delayed her start at USC to play for the United States in the 2016 U-20 Women's World Cup. She also played in the 2018 U-20 Women's World Cup, scoring four goals, and helped the U.S. win the 2015 CONCACAF Women's U-20 Championship in Honduras.

In September and October 2022, DeMelo received her first call-ups to the U.S. senior national team for friendlies against Nigeria, England, and Spain, but did not see any playing time.

On June 21, 2023, DeMelo was named to the U.S. squad for the 2023 FIFA Women's World Cup in Australia and New Zealand, becoming the third player to ever make a U.S. World Cup roster without previously earning a cap. She received her first cap coming on as a second half sub during the team's send-off match against Wales. At the World Cup, DeMelo was in the starting lineup for the team's first two group stage matches, a 3–0 win against Vietnam and a 1–1 tie to the Netherlands.

== Personal life ==
DeMelo is engaged to Louisville City FC defender Kyle Adams.

In 2025, DeMelo shared that she had been diagnosed with Graves' disease and hyperthyroidism near the end of the 2024 NWSL season.

On September 15, 2026, DeMelo sued UofL Health and two physicians for allegedly failing to diagnose a severe heart condition, which lead to her suffering a cardiac arrest during a match in September 2025.

== Career statistics ==
=== Club ===
As of July 7, 2024

Appearances and goals by club, season and competition
Club	Season	League			Cup (Note: Includes the NWSL Challenge Cup)		Playoffs (Note: Includes NWSL Playoffs)		Total	
Club	Season	Division	Apps	Goals	Apps	Goals	Apps	Goals	Apps	Goals
Racing Louisville FC	2022	NWSL	22	4	5	0	—		27	4
Racing Louisville FC	2023	NWSL	18	5	5	3	—		23	8
Racing Louisville FC	2024	NWSL	13	5	—		—		13	5
Career total			53	14	10	3	0	0	63	17

=== International ===
As of match played December 2, 2023

Appearances and goals by national team and year
National team	Year	Apps	Goals
United States	2023	7	0
Total		7	0

== Honors ==
Individual

- NWSL Best XI of the Month: May 2022, May 2023, June 2023, May 2024
- NWSL Rookie of the Month: July 2022
- NWSL Best XI Second Team: 2023
