= Emma Sears =

American soccer player (born 2001)

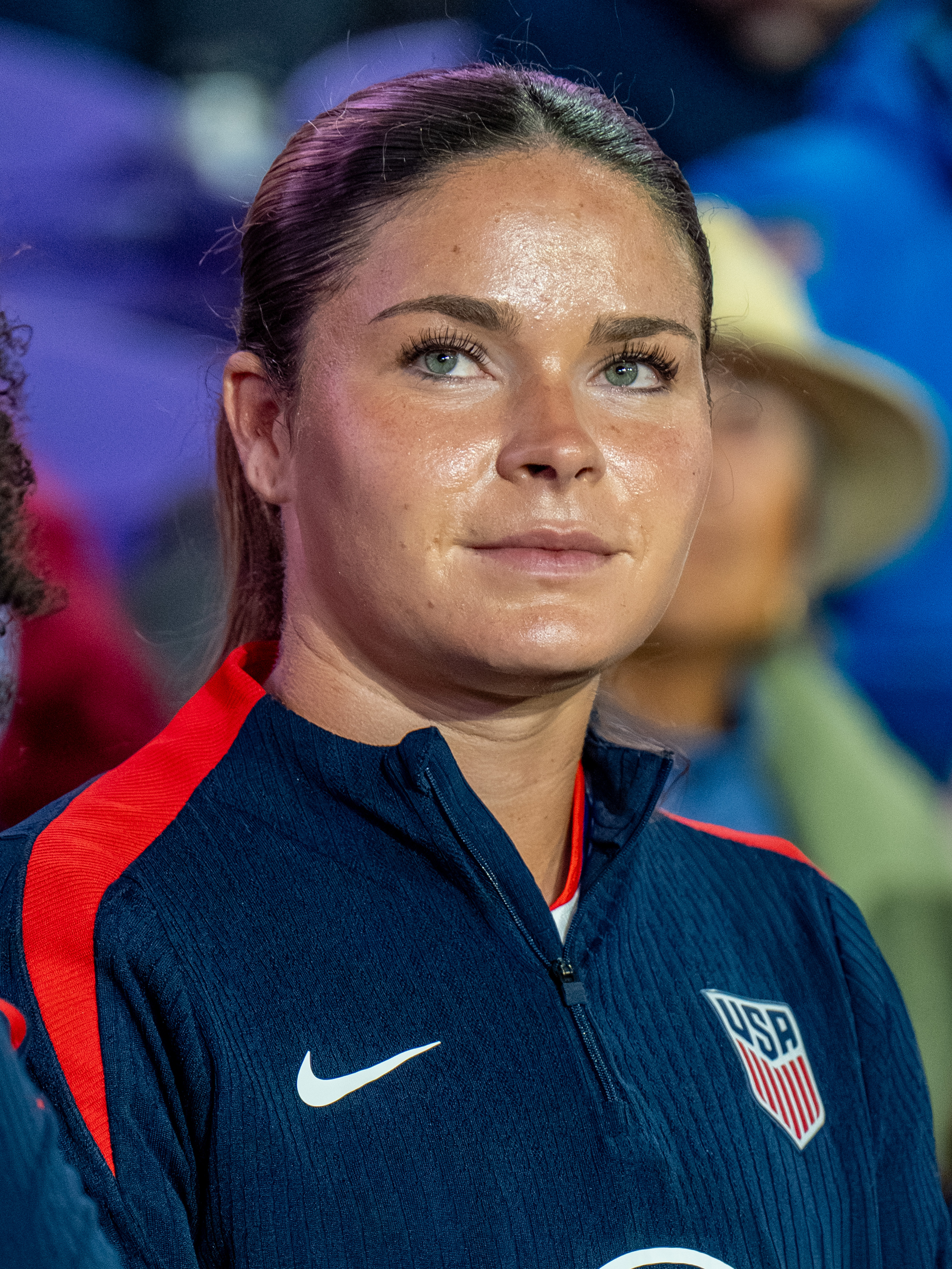
- Sears with the United States in 2025

Personal information
- Full name: Emma C. Sears
- Date of birth: February 23, 2001 (age 25)
- Place of birth: New Brunswick, New Jersey, United States
- Height: 5 ft 9 in (1.75 m)
- Position: Forward

Team information
- Current team: Racing Louisville FC
- Number: 13

Youth career
- Ohio Premier

College career
Years	Team	Apps	(Gls)
2019–2023	Ohio State Buckeyes	83	(25)

Senior career*
Years	Team	Apps	(Gls)
2024–	Racing Louisville FC	81	(22)

International career^{‡}
2024–	United States	22	(6)
- * Club domestic league appearances and goals as of 06:01, November 2, 2026 (UTC) ‡ National team caps and goals as of October 13, 2026

Emma C. Sears (born February 23, 2001) is an American professional soccer player who plays as a forward for Racing Louisville FC of the National Women's Soccer League (NWSL) and the United States national team. She played college soccer for the Ohio State Buckeyes and was drafted by Louisville in the second round of the 2024 NWSL Draft.

== Early life and college career ==
Sears was born in New Brunswick, New Jersey to Robin and Lindsay Sears. She lived in both England and Laguna Beach, California before moving to Dublin, Ohio. Sears attended Dublin Jerome High School where she was a four-year letterwinner and three-year starter for the girls' soccer team. She was named first team All-Ohio after both her junior and senior seasons. Sears played club soccer for Ohio Premier.

=== Ohio State Buckeyes ===
Sears attended the Ohio State University and featured in 83 matches for the Buckeyes from 2019 to 2023. She primarily played as a wide forward, but transitioned during her fifth year to a deeper playmaking position. She scored 25 goals, including the game-winner against Bucknell University in extra time in the first round of the 2022 NCAA tournament, and tallied 15 assists in total for the Buckeyes. Sears was a second team All-Big Ten honoree in Spring 2021 and 2022, and a first team All-Big Ten honoree in 2023. She graduated with a degree in health science in 2023.

== Club career ==
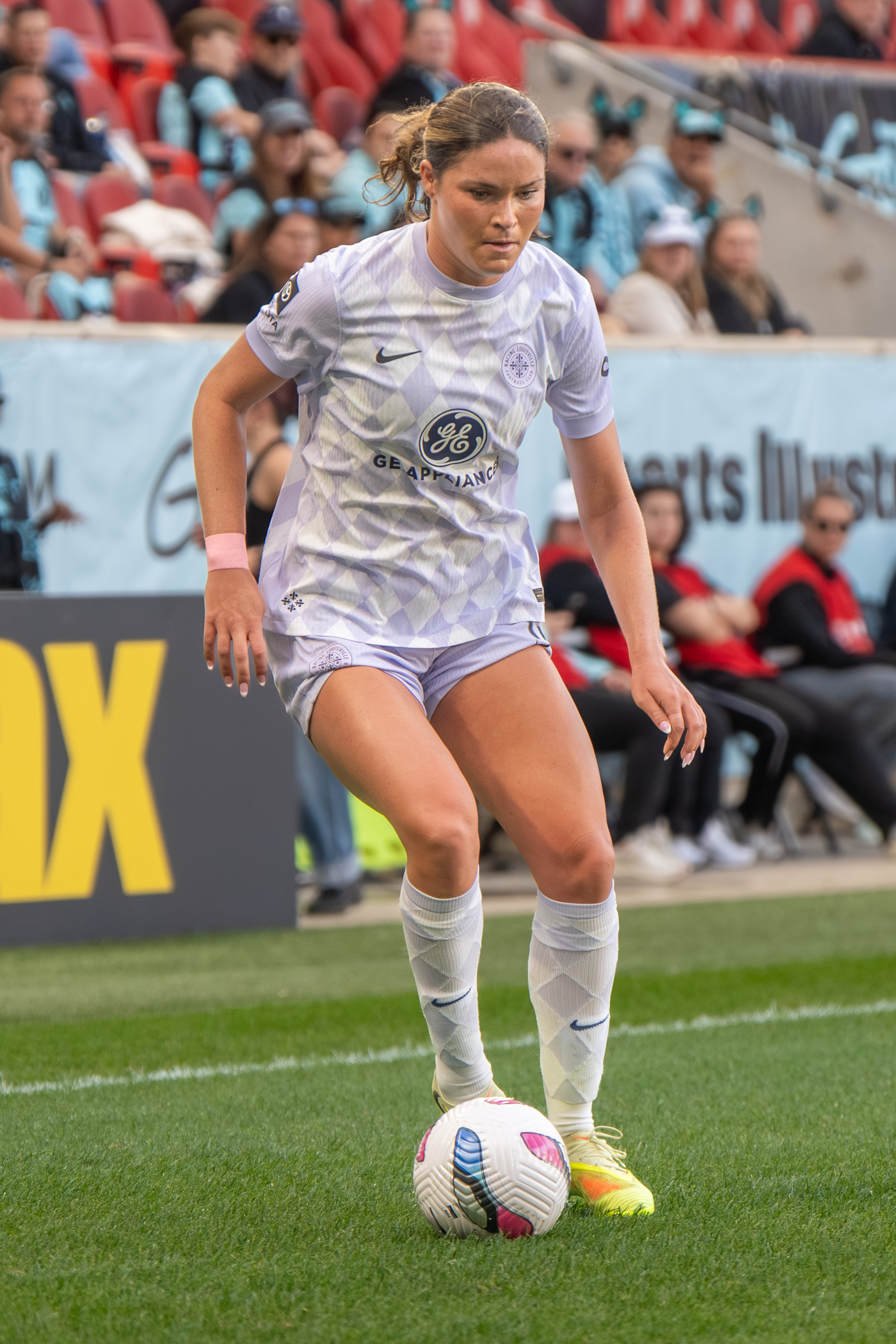
Sears with Racing Louisville in 2025

=== Racing Louisville ===
Sears was selected 28th overall in the second round of the 2024 NWSL Draft by Racing Louisville FC. She signed a one-year contract with an option for an additional year. She made her professional debut as a 66th-minute substitute against the Orlando Pride on the opening matchday on March 16. She scored her first professional goal in a 5–1 win over the Utah Royals on April 20. She earned her first start for Louisville against the Orlando Pride on May 5. Her next two goals for Racing were voted back-to-back NWSL Goals of the Week. She scored the first from a tight angle near the corner flag in a 3–3 draw to the Kansas City Current on May 18; the second set up a 1–0 win over the Chicago Red Stars on May 25. On May 22, Sears's contract was extended through the 2026 season. Sears finished her rookie season having scored 5 goals and 2 assists in 26 matches, including 12 starts.

In 2025, Sears scored a club-record 10 goals and was the top American goalscorer in the NWSL as she led Louisville to its first playoff appearance. Her strike against the Utah Royals on June 6 earned Sears her third career goal of the week award. Sears was named to the NWSL’s October/November Best XI after recording her first professional brace against the North Carolina Courage on October 4. On October 9, Sears signed a new contract to extend her time in Louisville to 2028. At the conclusion of the season, Sears was named to the 2025 NWSL Best XI Second Team.

== International career ==
Sears was called up to the United States national team in October 2024 for the team's Olympic gold medal victory tour, her first national call-up at any level. She earned her first cap as a 55th-minute substitute for Yazmeen Ryan in a 3–1 friendly win over Iceland on October 27, 2024. She assisted Lynn Williams for the USWNT's opening goal and scored herself in the 90+3rd minute, becoming the first player to score and assist on her USWNT debut since Christen Press in 2013.

On October 29, 2025, Sears scored her first international hat trick in a 6–0 victory over New Zealand.

== Personal life ==
Sears has a twin sister, Bronwen, who played collegiate soccer for the Miami RedHawks.

== Career statistics ==
=== Club ===
As of March 12, 2025

Appearances and goals by club, season and competition
Club	Season	League			Cup (Note: Includes the NWSL Challenge Cup, The Women's Cup, and NWSL x Liga MX Femenil Summer Cup)		Playoffs (Note: Includes NWSL Playoffs)		Total	
Club	Season	Division	Apps	Goals	Apps	Goals	Apps	Goals	Apps	Goals
Racing Louisville FC	2024	NWSL	26	5	3	1	—		29	6
Racing Louisville FC	2025	NWSL	26	10	2	1	1	0	29	11
Career total			52	15	5	2	1	0	58	17

=== International ===
As of match played October 13, 2026

National Team	Year	Apps	Goals
United States	2024	3	1
United States	2025	9	3
United States	2026	10	2
Total		22	6

=== International goals ===
As of January 27, 2026

Goal	Date	Location	Opponent	Score	Result	Competition	Ref.
1	October 27, 2024	Nashville, Tennessee	Iceland	3–1	3–1	Friendly	
2	October 29, 2025	Kansas City, Missouri	New Zealand	1–0	6–0	Friendly	
3	October 29, 2025	Kansas City, Missouri	New Zealand	4–0	6–0	Friendly	
4	October 29, 2025	Kansas City, Missouri	New Zealand	6–0	6–0	Friendly	
5	January 24, 2026	Carson, California	Paraguay	6–0	6–0	Friendly	
6	January 27, 2026	Santa Barbara, California	Chile	4–0	5–0	Friendly	

== Honors and awards ==
United States

- SheBelieves Cup: 2026

Racing Louisville

- The Women's Cup: 2025

Individual

- NWSL Second XI: 2025
