= Elexa Bahr =

Colombian footballer (born 1998)

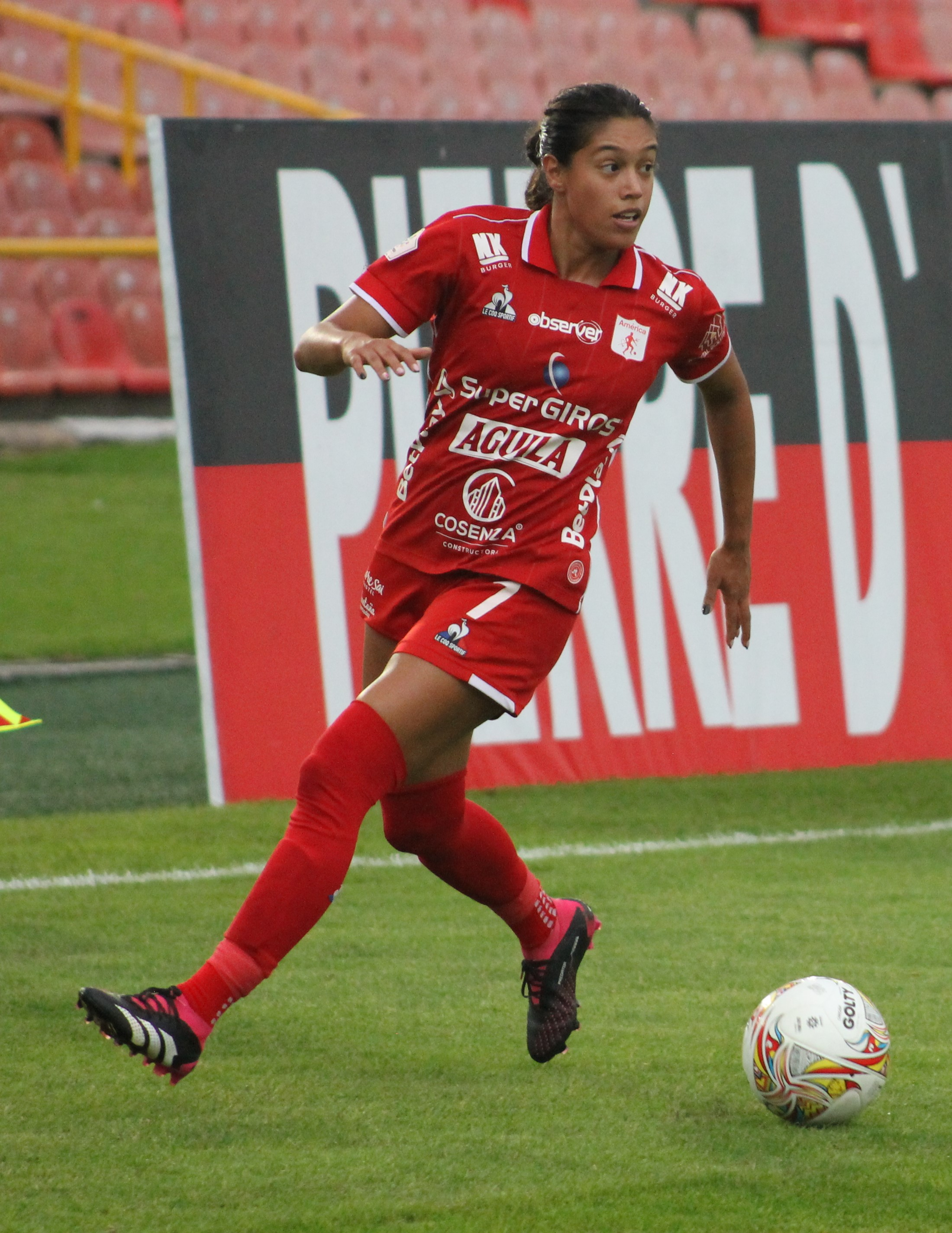
- Bahr playing for América de Cali in 2023

Personal information
- Full name: Elexa Marie Bahr Gutiérrez
- Date of birth: 26 May 1998 (age 28)
- Place of birth: Buford, Georgia, U.S.
- Height: 1.60 m (5 ft 3 in)
- Position: Forward

Team information
- Current team: Western Sydney Wanderers
- Number: 9

Youth career
- Buford Wolves

College career
Years	Team	Apps	(Gls)
2016–2019	South Carolina Gamecocks	88	(18)

Senior career*
Years	Team	Apps	(Gls)
2020–2022	Racing Féminas	46	(11)
2022	Deportivo Cali	0	(0)
2023–2024	América de Cali	17	(6)
2024–2025	Racing Louisville	16	(1)
2025	→ América de Cali (loan)	22	(10)
2025–2026	Genoa	20	(1)
2026–	Western Sydney Wanderers	0	(0)

International career^{‡}
2015	Honduras U20	5	(3)
2021–	Colombia	21	(1)
Medal record
Women's football
Representing Colombia
Copa América Femenina
Runner-up	2022 Colombia
- * Club domestic league appearances and goals as of 9 August 2026 ‡ National team caps and goals as of 27 February 2024

Elexa Marie Bahr Gutiérrez (born 26 May 1998) is a professional footballer who plays as a forward for A-League Women side Western Sydney Wanderers. Born in the United States, she plays for the Colombia women's national team. She represented Colombia at the 2022 Copa América Femenina, where the Colombians finished as runner-up, as well as the 2023 FIFA Women's World Cup. She has previously represented Honduras at under-20 level.

== Club career ==
Bahr attended Buford High School in her hometown and the University of South Carolina in Columbia, South Carolina.

In 2020, Bahr signed a professional contract with Spanish club Racing Féminas, which currently plays in the Segunda División Pro; the second level of league competition for Spanish women's football.

Bahr was announced as a reinforcement for Deportivo Cali ahead of the 2022 Copa Libertadores Femenina on 25 August 2022. She debuted on September 17 against Olimpia in the friendly tournament, Copa Ídolas 2022, with a goal. Her team went on to win the tournament in the final against Atlético Mineiro which also included the hometown rival, América de Cali.

It was announced on 25 January 2023, that Bahr had signed for rivals América de Cali ahead of the 2023 season. She made 17 appearances for the club and scored six goals, helping the club to win the first stage of league play.

It was announced on 18 January 2024 that Bahr had signed a two-year deal with Racing Louisville through the 2025 NWSL season. In January 2025, Racing Louisville announced the season-long loan of Bahr to former club América de Cali.

In September 2025, Bahr signed a two-year contract with Italian club Genoa.

In September 2026, Bahr joined Australian A-League Women club Western Sydney Wanderers.

== International career ==
Bahr was born in the United States to a Honduran father and a Colombian mother, which made her eligible to represent the United States, Honduras, and Colombia at international level.

=== Honduras U20 ===
Bahr initially represented Honduras at the 2015 CONCACAF Women's U-20 Championship, where she scored three goals. Honduras ultimately failed to qualify for the 2016 FIFA U-20 Women's World Cup, following a 2–0 defeat to Mexico in the third-place play-off.

=== Colombia ===
She made her senior debut for Colombia on 23 October 2021 as an 87th-minute substitution in a 2–0 friendly home win over Chile. In November 2021, Bahr was called up for two friendlies against Uruguay; she was substituted on in both games as Colombia won 3–2 and 1–0, respectively.

During the first half of 2022, Bahr appeared in five friendlies in preparation for the 2022 Copa América Femenina. On 3 July 2022, Bahr was included in Nelson Abadía's final Colombia squad for the Copa América. She made her tournament debut during Colombia's opening match against Paraguay, coming on as a substitute for Mayra Ramírez as Colombia went on to win 4–2. Bahr was an unused substitute in the final against Brazil where Colombia finished as the tournament's runner-up after losing 0–1.

Bahr was named to the roster for the 2023 FIFA Women's World Cup, but did not make an appearance.
