= List of Racing Louisville FC players =

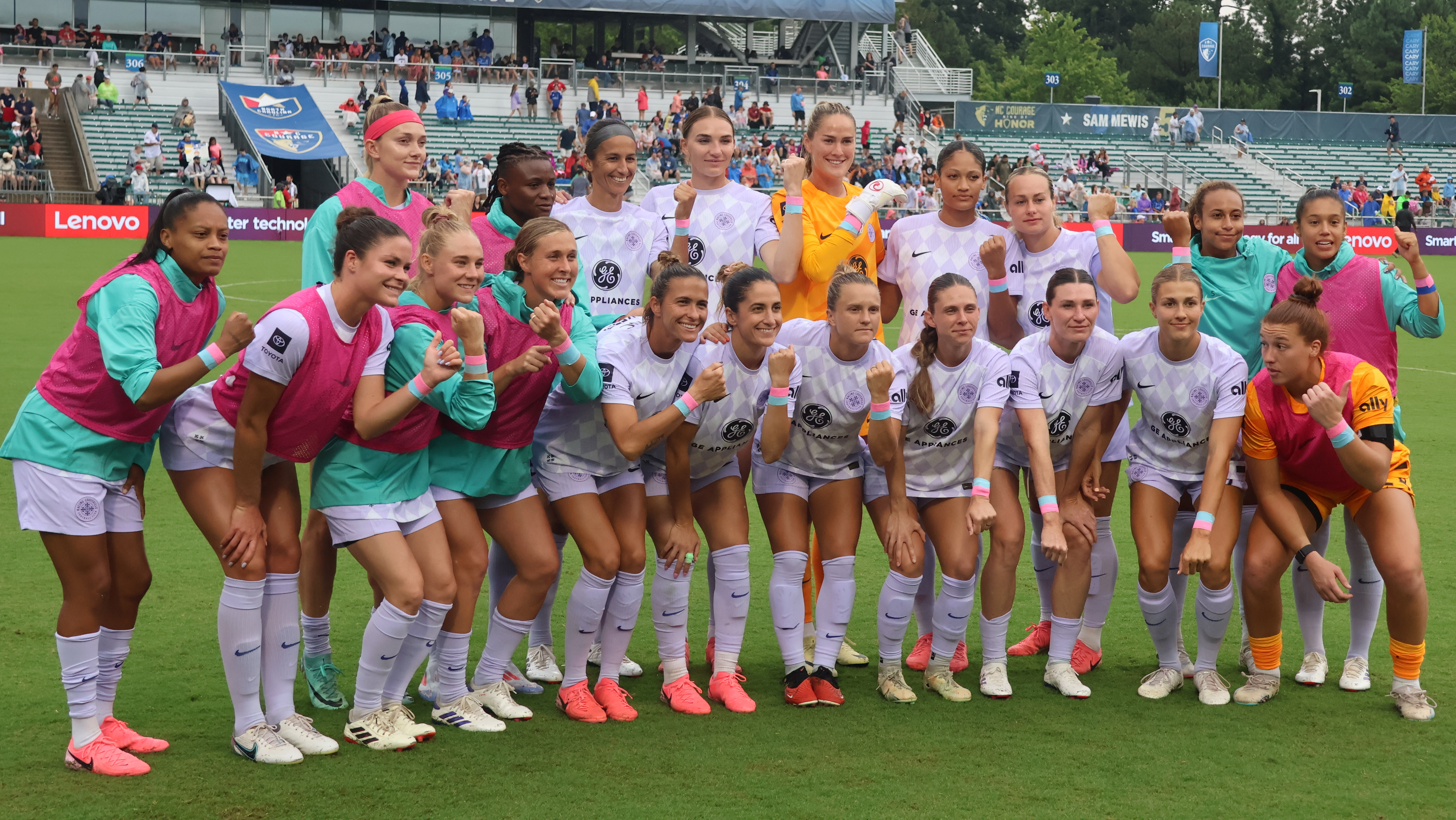
Racing Louisville FC players pose for a photo before a match against the North Carolina Courage on July 7, 2024.

Racing Louisville FC is an American professional women's soccer club which began play in the National Women's Soccer League (NWSL) in 2021.

The team's first acquisitions were Japanese midfielder Yūki Nagasato and American midfielder Savannah McCaskill, acquired via trade with Chicago Red Stars. The team's initial acquisitions included players and player rights taken in the 2020 NWSL Expansion Draft, though not all of the draft's selections agreed to contracts with Racing or reported to the club and were not rostered as a result.

All Racing Louisville players who have appeared for the team in an official competition are listed below.

== Key ==
- The list is ordered alphabetically.
- Appearances as a substitute are included.
- Statistics are correct as of November 1, 2026, the end of the 2026 National Women's Soccer League season, and are updated once a year after the conclusion of the NWSL season.
- Players whose names are highlighted in **bold** were active players on the Racing Louisville roster as of the list's most recent update.

Positions key
GK	Goalkeeper
DF	Defender
MF	Midfielder
FW	Forward

Nationality
Unless otherwise noted, the nationality of a player is determined by the country they most recently represented in international play, or if said player has not played international football then by their country of birth.
Position
Playing positions are listed according to the player's roster designation as of the list's most recent update.
Years
Years are defined as the first and last calendar years in which the player was rostered for the club in any of the competitions listed below.
Appearances and goals
This list counts appearances and goals in the NWSL, NWSL playoffs, NWSL Challenge Cup, and NWSL x Liga MX Femenil Summer Cup.

== Players ==
Yrs	No.	Pos	Nat	Player	Total		NWSL		Playoffs		Cup (Note: Includes the NWSL Challenge Cup)		Other (Note: Includes the NWSL x Liga MX Femenil Summer Cup)	
Yrs	No.	Pos	Nat	Player	Apps	Goals	Apps	Goals	Apps	Goals	Apps	Goals	Apps	Goals
2021	16	DF	(United States) USA	Julia Ashley	16	0	15	0	0	0	1	0	0	0
2023	26	MF	(United States) USA	Taylor Aylmer	4	0	2	0	0	0	2	0	0	0
2023–2025	19	MF	(United States) USA	Jordan Baggett	20	2	13	1	0	0	6	1	1	0
2024–2025	23	FW	(Colombia) COL	Elexa Bahr	19	1	16	1	0	0	0	0	3	0
2024–2025	88	FW	(United States) USA	Bethany Balcer	22	4	21	4	1	0	0	0	0	0
2024–2025	15	DF	(Colombia) COL	Ángela Barón	1	0	1	0	0	0	0	0	0	0
2021	33	FW	(United States) USA	Jorian Baucom	15	1	12	0	0	0	3	1	0	0
2021	1	GK	(United States) USA	Michelle Betos	24	0	20	0	0	0	4	0	0	0
2022–	24	GK	(United States) USA	Jordyn Bloomer	51	0	47	0	1	0	1	0	2	0
2021–2022	4	DF	(England) ENG	Gemma Bonner	39	2	33	1	0	0	6	1	0	0
2023–2025	8	MF	(Brazil) BRA	Ary Borges	60	5	53	3	1	0	3	1	3	1
2022–2023	27	MF	(Australia) AUS	Alex Chidiac	28	2	26	2	0	0	2	0	0	0
2025–	32, 19	MF	(United States) USA	Avery Ciorbu	6	0	6	0	0	0	0	0	0	0
2024–2025	18	FW	(New Zealand) NZL	Milly Clegg	1	0	1	0	0	0	0	0	0	0
2022–	7	MF	(United States) USA	Savannah DeMelo	91	20	81	17	0	0	8	3	2	0
2024–	14	MF	(United States) USA	Marisa DiGrande	50	2	46	2	1	0	0	0	3	0
2021–2023	13	FW	(Bosnia and Herzegovina) BIH	Emina Ekić	51	4	38	3	0	0	13	1	0	0
2023–2024	20	DF	(New Zealand) NZL	Abby Erceg	56	2	48	2	0	0	5	0	3	0
2023–	9	FW	(United States) USA	Kayla Fischer	95	15	85	12	1	1	6	1	3	1
2024–	26	MF	(United States) USA	Taylor Flint	71	12	67	12	1	0	0	0	3	0
2021–2022	11	DF	(United States) USA	Emily Fox	50	1	40	1	0	0	10	0	0	0
2026–	15	DF	(United States) USA	Mirann Gacioch	18	1	18	1	0	0	0	0	0	0
2022–2024	21	FW	(United States) USA	Parker Goins	39	4	31	2	0	0	6	2	2	0
2022	23	FW	(United States) USA	Sh'Nia Gordon	7	0	4	0	0	0	3	0	0	0
2025–2026	6	DF	(United States) USA	Ella Hase	45	1	44	1	1	0	0	0	0	0
2021	15	DF	(United States) USA	Brooke Hendrix	11	1	7	0	0	0	4	1	0	0
2026–	21	FW	(United States) USA	Rachel Hill	18	0	18	0	0	0	0	0	0	0
2026–	10	MF	(United States) USA	Macey Hodge	23	0	23	0	0	0	0	0	0	0
2022–2023	25	DF	(Northern Ireland) NIR	Rebecca Holloway	16	0	15	0	0	0	1	0	0	0
2022–2024	6	MF	(United States) USA	Jaelin Howell	63	1	50	0	0	0	10	1	3	0
2025–	5	DF	(United States) USA	Ellie Jean	58	1	54	1	1	0	0	0	3	0
2023–2025	29	FW	(Nigeria) NGR	Uchenna Kanu	38	7	35	6	0	0	3	1	0	0
2021	27	FW	(Dominican Republic) DOM	Vanessa Kara	3	0	1	0	0	0	2	0	0	0
2022–2023	16, 11	FW	(South Africa) RSA	Thembi Kgatlana	16	2	14	2	0	0	2	0	0	0
2021–2022	5	FW	(United States) USA	Cece Kizer	38	8	29	5	0	0	9	3	0	0
2026–	16	FW	(United States) USA	Maja Lardner	23	2	23	2	0	0	0	0	0	0
2022–2023	15	DF	(United States) USA	Julia Lester	41	0	33	0	0	0	8	0	0	0
2021–2025	23, 1	GK	(United States) USA	Katie Lund	92	0	80	0	0	0	11	0	1	0
2022	12	MF	(United States) USA	Taylor Malham	5	0	4	0	0	0	1	0	0	0
2021–2022	14, 17	DF	(United States) USA	Nealy Martin	36	0	29	0	0	0	7	0	0	0
2021–2022	20	FW	(Jamaica) JAM	Cheyna Matthews	17	1	17	1	0	0	0	0	0	0
2021	7	FW	(United States) USA	Savannah McCaskill	27	2	23	2	0	0	4	0	0	0
2021	22	FW	(United States) USA	Katie McClure	18	1	15	1	0	0	3	0	0	0
2022–2023	14	FW	(United States) USA	Jessica McDonald	30	4	26	3	0	0	4	1	0	0
2026–	88	FW	(United States) USA	Audrey McKeen	25	1	25	1	0	0	0	0	0	0
2026–	12	DF	(United States) USA	Quincy McMahon	25	0	25	0	0	0	0	0	0	0
2021–2022	26	DF	(United States) USA	Addisyn Merrick	10	0	5	0	0	0	5	0	0	0
2021–	2	DF	(United States) USA	Lauren Milliet	163	5	143	4	1	0	16	1	3	0
2021	12	DF	(United States) USA	Sinclaire Miramontez	14	0	14	0	0	0	0	0	0	0
2023	5	FW	(United States) USA	Paige Monaghan	28	4	22	3	0	0	6	1	0	0
2025–	4	DF	(United States) USA	Makenna Morris	29	1	29	1	0	0	0	0	0	0
2024	10	MF	(South Africa) RSA	Linda Motlhalo	2	0	1	0	0	0	0	0	1	0
2022–2023	44	DF	(Jamaica) JAM	Satara Murray	10	0	9	0	0	0	1	0	0	0
2021–2023	10	FW	(Denmark) DEN	Nadia Nadim	28	10	25	10	0	0	3	0	0	0
2021	17	FW	(Japan) JPN	Yūki Nagasato	25	2	21	2	0	0	4	0	0	0
2025–	20	MF	(United States) USA	Katie O'Kane	57	5	56	5	1	0	0	0	0	0
2021–2022	8	MF	(Sweden) SWE	Freja Olofsson	46	0	37	0	0	0	9	0	0	0
2021–2022	19	MF	(United States) USA	Taylor Otto	17	0	11	0	0	0	6	0	0	0
2024–	11, 8	DF	(United States) USA	Courtney Petersen	52	0	51	0	1	0	0	0	0	0
2026–	23	DF	(United States) USA	Macy Philippus	8	1	8	1	0	0	0	0	0	0
2023–2024	16	DF	(United States) USA	Carson Pickett	32	0	31	0	1	0	0	0	0	0
2023–2025	4	DF	(Finland) FIN	Elli Pikkujämsä	28	1	22	1	0	0	6	0	0	0
2023–	17	MF	(United States) USA	Maddie Pokorny	24	0	20	0	0	0	3	0	1	0
2026–	1	GK	(United States) USA	Maddie Prohaska	4	0	4	0	0	0	0	0	0	0
2021	18	DF	(United States) USA	Kaleigh Riehl	23	0	21	0	0	0	2	0	0	0
2021–2022	9	FW	(England) ENG	Ebony Salmon	29	6	25	6	0	0	4	0	0	0
2024–	13	FW	(United States) USA	Emma Sears	85	23	81	22	1	0	0	0	3	1
2022–2023	77	FW	(China) CHN	Wang Shuang	22	2	22	2	0	0	0	0	0	0
2021–2022	3	DF	(United States) USA	Erin Simon	29	0	23	0	0	0	6	0	0	0
2024–2025	16	FW	(Canada) CAN	Janine Sonis	37	4	36	4	1	0	0	0	0	0
2024	66	FW	(United States) USA	Reilyn Turner	19	5	16	4	0	0	0	0	3	1
2025–	42	FW	(United States) USA	Sarah Weber	52	6	51	6	1	0	0	0	0	0
2026–	11	FW	(United States) USA	Taylor White	10	1	10	1	0	0	0	0	0	0
2024–	3	DF	(United States) USA	Arin Wright	73	2	69	2	1	0	0	0	3	0
2022–2025	22	FW	(United States) USA	Kirsten Wright	48	7	39	6	0	0	9	1	0	0
2022–2023	30, 3	DF	(United States) USA	Zaneta Wyne	11	0	9	0	0	0	2	0	0	0

== See also ==
- 2020 NWSL Expansion Draft
- List of top-division football clubs in CONCACAF countries
- List of professional sports teams in the United States and Canada
