= 2026 Racing Louisville FC season =

Racing Louisville FC 2026 soccer season

Racing Louisville FC
2026 season
- General manager: Caitlyn Flores Milby
- Head coach: Bev Yanez
- Stadium: Lynn Family Stadium (capacity: 11,700)
- League: 15th
- Top goalscorer: Kayla Fischer (8)
- Highest home attendance: 7,018 (vs BAY, Oct 24)
- Lowest home attendance: 4,528 (vs KC, Nov 1)
- Average home league attendance: 5,454
- Biggest win: 4–1 (vs BOS (H), NWSL, Aug 15)
- Biggest defeat: 1–6 (vs DEN (A), NWSL, Oct 24)
| Home colors | Away colors | Third colors |
- All statistics correct as of November 1, 2026.

The 2026 Racing Louisville FC season was the team's sixth season as a professional women's soccer team. Racing Louisville FC played in the National Women's Soccer League (NWSL), the top tier of women's soccer in the United States.

== Team ==
=== Coaching staff ===
As of July 11, 2026

Technical
| Head coach | Beverly Yanez |
| Assistant coach | Mitch Sowerby |
| Goalkeeper coach | Sergio Gonzalez |
| Assistant coach | Kiley Polk |
| Individual Development Coach | Jo Chubb |
| Video Analyst | Charlie Tuley |
| Head of Performance | John Ireland |
Support
| Director of Operations | Shelby Gilmore |
| Player care coordinator | Lilly Andres |
| Head equipment manager | Sarah Kanuch |
| Athletic trainer | Michaela Clay |
| Applied sports scientist | Phil Congleton |
| Dietitian | Rose Donnelly |

=== Squad ===
As of July 11, 2026.

| No. | Pos. | Nation | Player |
|---|---|---|---|
| 1 | GK | USA | Maddie Prohaska |
| 2 | DF | USA | Lauren Milliet |
| 3 | DF | USA | Arin Wright |
| 4 | MF | USA | Makenna Morris |
| 5 | DF | USA | Ellie Jean |
| 6 | FW | USA | Ella Hase |
| 7 | MF | USA | Savannah DeMelo |
| 8 | DF | USA | Courtney Petersen |
| 9 | FW | USA | Kayla Fischer |
| 10 | MF | USA | Macey Hodge |
| 11 | FW | USA | Taylor White |
| 12 | DF | USA | Quincy McMahon |
| 13 | FW | USA | Emma Sears |
| 14 | MF | USA | Marisa DiGrande (ML) |
| 15 | DF | USA | Mirann Gacioch |
| 16 | FW | USA | Maja Lardner |
| 17 | MF | USA | Maddie Pokorny |
| 19 | DF | USA | Avery Ciorbu |
| 20 | MF | USA | Katie O'Kane |
| 21 | FW | USA | Rachel Hill |
| 22 | MF | USA | Natalie Mitchell |
| 23 | DF | USA | Macy Philippus |
| 24 | GK | USA | Jordyn Bloomer |
| 26 | MF | USA | Taylor Flint |
| 30 | GK | USA | Erynn Floyd |
| 33 | GK | PUR | Cristina Roque |
| 42 | FW | USA | Sarah Weber |
| 88 | FW | USA | Audrey McKeen |
| 99 | GK | USA | Olivia Sekany (SEI) |

=== Regular season ===
==== March ====
| March 14 1 | North Carolina Courage | 2–1 | Racing Louisville FC | Cary, North Carolina |
| 7:00 pm EDT | Sanchez 29', 86'; Jacobs (yellow card) 40' | Report | Weber 45+1' | Stadium: WakeMed Soccer Park; Attendance: 8,157; Referee: Jaclyn Metz |

| March 20 2 | Racing Louisville FC | 2–2 | Washington Spirit | Louisville, Kentucky |
| 8:00 pm EDT | Fischer 28'; Sears 43', (yellow card) 76'; Flint (yellow card) 90+6' | Report | Cantore 50'; Santos 74' | Stadium: Lynn Family Stadium; Attendance: 5,722; Referee: Calin Radosav |

| March 28 3 | Seattle Reign FC | 2–1 | Racing Louisville FC | Spokane, Washington |
| 6:30 pm EDT | Mercado 10'; Mondésir 41' | Report | Hodge (yellow card) 63'; Blackburn 90+4' | Stadium: One Spokane Stadium; Attendance: 3,879; Referee: Gerald Flores |

==== April ====
| April 3 4 | Houston Dash | 4–3 | Racing Louisville FC | Houston, Texas |
| 8:30 pm EDT | Rader 39' (pen.); Nielsen (yellow card) 45+5'; Van Zanten 50', 67'; Campbell (yellow card) 78'; Puntigam 90+9' (pen.); Patterson (yellow card) 90+12' | Report | Flint 23' (pen.), 81' (pen.); Weber 48'; Hodge (yellow card) 56'; O'Kane (yellow card) 69' | Stadium: Shell Energy Stadium; Attendance: 5,442; Referee: Alexandra Billeter |

| April 24 5 | Racing Louisville FC | 3–2 | Orlando Pride | Louisville, Kentucky |
| 5:30 pm EDT | Milliet 19', 50'; Weber 47'; Morris (yellow card) 90+1' | Report | Banda 45+6', 90+3'; McCutcheon (yellow card) 90' | Stadium: Lynn Family Stadium; Attendance: 4,928; Referee: Alyssa Pennington |

| April 29 6 | Washington Spirit | 1–0 | Racing Louisville FC | Washington, D.C. |
| 7:00 pm EDT | Rodman (yellow card) 10', (goal) 15' | Report | Fischer (yellow card) 34' | Stadium: Audi Field; Attendance: 10,587; Referee: Trevor Wiseman |

==== May ====
| May 3 7 | Gotham FC | 1–0 | Racing Louisville FC | Harrison, New Jersey |
| 5:00 pm EDT | Shaw 16' | Report | O'Kane (yellow card) 7'; Flint (yellow card) 45+5'; McMahon (yellow card) 90+1' | Stadium: Sports Illustrated Stadium; Attendance: 6,193; Referee: JC Griggs |

| May 8 8 | Racing Louisville FC | 3–1 | Portland Thorns FC | Louisville, Kentucky |
| 6:30 pm EDT | O'Kane 14', 77'; Fischer (yellow card) 41'; Flint (yellow card) 73'; Sears 90+6' | Report | Wilson 6'; Hiatt (yellow card) 76' | Stadium: Lynn Family Stadium; Attendance: 5,356; Referee: Muhammad Hassan |

| May 17 9 | Utah Royals | 2–1 | Racing Louisville FC | Sandy, Utah |
| 8:00 pm EDT | Milliet 22' (o.g.); Tanaka 77' | Report | Flint (yellow card) 45+4'; Fischer 68' | Stadium: America First Field; Attendance: 6,514; Referee: Elton Garcia |

| May 23 10 | Racing Louisville FC | 1–2 | North Carolina Courage | Louisville, Kentucky |
| 4:00 pm EDT | McMahon (yellow card) 8'; Wright 90+1' | Report | Ijeh 13'; Jackson (yellow card) 39'; Sanchez 78'; Shiragaki (yellow card) 87' | Stadium: Lynn Family Stadium; Attendance: 5,942; Referee: Katja Koroleva |

| May 29 11 | Racing Louisville FC | 0–1 | Denver Summit FC | Louisville, Kentucky |
| 6:00 p.m. MDT (UTC-6) | Milliet (yellow card) 47' | Report | Yamamoto (yellow card) 32'; Thomas (yellow card) 49'; Brazier 64' | Stadium: Lynn Family Stadium; Attendance: 6,034; Referee: Calin Radosav |

==== July ====
| July 5 12 | Portland Thorns FC | 4–0 | Racing Louisville FC | Portland, Oregon |
| 7:00 pm EDT | Perry (yellow card) 8', (goal) 13'; Tordin 36'; Turner 41'; Immethun (yellow card) 75'; Wilson 82' | Report | Jean (yellow card) 17'; Hodge (yellow card) 61' | Stadium: Providence Park; Attendance: 16,638; Referee: Shawn Tehini |

| July 10 13 | Racing Louisville FC | 0–2 | Bay FC | Louisville, Kentucky |
| 8:00 pm EDT | McMahon (yellow card) 70' | Report | Fuller 21'; Moreau (yellow card) 28'; Lema 58' | Stadium: Lynn Family Stadium; Attendance: 5,328; Referee: Trevor Wiseman |

| July 18 14 | Racing Louisville FC | 1–1 | Houston Dash | Louisville, Kentucky |
| 8:00 pm EDT | Fischer 19', (yellow card) 28'; Sears (yellow card) 71'; Hodge (yellow card) 81'; Flint (yellow card) 90+7' | Report | Ullmark (yellow card) 8'; Chapman (yellow card) 23'; Rader 90+5' | Stadium: Lynn Family Stadium; Attendance: 4,728; Referee: Matthew Thompson |

| July 26 15 | Angel City FC | 1–2 | Racing Louisville FC | Los Angeles, California |
| 9:00 pm EDT | Sams (yellow card) 36'; Jónsdóttir 80' | Report | Lardner 24', 55', (yellow card) 45+3'; Hill (yellow card) 90+3' | Stadium: BMO Stadium; Attendance: 15,908; Referee: Laura Rodriguez |

| July 29 16 | Kansas City Current | 5–1 | Racing Louisville FC | Kansas City, Missouri |
| 8:00 pm EDT | Hopkins 5', 48'; Debinha 15', 52'; White 20'; Scott (yellow card) 81' | Report | Milliet (yellow card) 45+5'; Fischer (yellow card) 72'; Flint 81' (pen.) | Stadium: CPKC Stadium; Attendance: 11,500; Referee: Danielle Chesky |

==== August ====
| August 1 17 | Racing Louisville FC | 2–1 | Chicago Stars FC | Louisville, Kentucky |
| 4:00 pm EDT | Gacioch 55'; Fischer 62' | Report | Ouahabi (yellow card) 40'; Gomes 80' | Stadium: Lynn Family Stadium; Attendance: 5,148; Referee: Muhammad Kaleia |

| August 7 18 | Orlando Pride | 1–3 | Racing Louisville FC | Orlando, Florida |
| 7:00 pm EDT | Abello 90+4' | Report | McKeen 16'; O'Kane (yellow card) 45+1'; Sears 68', 86' | Stadium: Inter.co Stadium; Attendance: 6,214; Referee: Muhammad Hassan |

| August 15 19 | Racing Louisville FC | 4–1 | Boston Legacy FC | Louisville, Kentucky |
| 6:30 pm EDT | Fischer 44', 62'; O'Kane 53' (pen.); Sears 59' | Report | Smith 90+5' | Stadium: Lynn Family Stadium; Attendance: 7,018; Referee: Calin Radosav |

| August 19 20 | Racing Louisville FC | 2–1 | Seattle Reign FC | Louisville, Kentucky |
| 6:30 pm EDT | Sears 35', 52' | Report | Mercado 19'; James-Turner (yellow card) 33' | Stadium: Lynn Family Stadium; Attendance: 5,258; Referee: Brandon Stevis |

| August 23 21 | Chicago Stars FC | 3–2 | Racing Louisville FC | Evanston, Illinois |
| 2:00 pm EDT | Joseph 34'; Swanson 62'; Grosso 83' | Report | Flint 49'; Morris 68' | Stadium: Martin Stadium; Attendance: 4,405; Referee: Corbyn May |

| August 28 22 | San Diego Wave FC | 3–2 | Racing Louisville FC | San Diego, California |
| 10:00 pm EDT | Byars 47', 76'; Dali 80'; Barcenas (yellow card) 88' | Report | Milliet 12'; Flint 23'; Fischer (yellow card) 58'; McMahon (yellow card) 59'; Hodge (yellow card) 86' | Stadium: Snapdragon Stadium; Attendance: 12,220; Referee: Atahan Yaya |

==== September ====
| September 5 23 | Racing Louisville FC | 0–2 | Angel City FC | Louisville, Kentucky |
| 6:30 pm EDT | Hodge (yellow card) 38' | Report | Shores 69', 90+1'; Jónsdóttir (yellow card) 86' | Stadium: Lynn Family Stadium; Attendance: 5,782; Referee: Laadi Issaka |

| September 11 24 | Racing Louisville FC | 1–2 | Gotham FC | Louisville, Kentucky |
| 6:30 pm EDT | Fischer 17'; Weber (yellow card) 45'; Milliet (yellow card) 69'; Morris (yellow card) 90+3' | Report | Reiten 8'; Shaw 46' | Stadium: Lynn Family Stadium; Attendance: 5,748; Referee: Robert Vincze |

| September 20 25 | Bay FC | 2–0 | Racing Louisville FC | San Jose, California |
| 7:00 pm EDT | Pfeiffer 50'; Lema 56'; Conti (yellow card) 90+2' | Report | Wright (yellow card) 35' | Stadium: PayPal Park; Attendance: 11,427; Referee: Amin Hadzic |

| September 25 26 | Racing Louisville FC | 0–2 | San Diego Wave FC | Louisville, Kentucky |
| 6:30 pm EDT | Fischer (yellow card) 63' | Report | Corley 27'; Ludmila 49' | Stadium: Lynn Family Stadium; Attendance: 5,128; Referee: Joshua Encarnación |

==== October and November ====
| October 3 27 | Racing Louisville FC | 1–1 | Utah Royals | Louisville, Kentucky |
| 4:00 pm EDT | Hodge (yellow card) 33'; O'Kane 42' (pen.); Weber (yellow card) 45+3' | Report | Hammond (yellow card) 11'; Tanaka (yellow card) 45+5'; Palacios (yellow card) 66'; Mozingo 90+6' | Stadium: Lynn Family Stadium; Attendance: 5,155; Referee: Rodrigo Albuquerque |

| October 16 28 | Boston Legacy FC | 2–1 | Racing Louisville FC | Foxborough, Massachusetts |
| 8:00 pm EDT | Gutierres 9'; Davis 51'; Reale (yellow card) 90' | Report | Fischer 22' | Stadium: Gillette Stadium; Attendance: 13,892; Referee: John Griggs |

| October 24 29 | Denver Summit FC | 6–1 | Racing Louisville FC | Centennial, Colorado |
| 6:30 pm EDT | Flint 19', 68'; Kurtz 45+2'; Kössler 59'; Heaps 66'; Ryan 81' | Report | White 79' | Stadium: Centennial Stadium; Attendance: 12,372; Referee: Brad Jensen |

| November 1 30 | Racing Louisville FC | 0–2 | Kansas City Current | Louisville, Kentucky |
| 5:00 pm EST | Weber (yellow card) 32'; O'Kane (yellow card) 40' | Report | Sharples 15'; Hopkins 59' | Stadium: Lynn Family Stadium; Attendance: 4,528; Referee: Jaclyn Metz |

==== Regular-season standings ====
| Pos | Team | Pld | W | D | L | GF | GA | GD | Pts |
|---|---|---|---|---|---|---|---|---|---|
| 12 | Houston Dash | 30 | 9 | 6 | 15 | 38 | 44 | −6 | 33 |
| 13 | Boston Legacy FC | 30 | 9 | 6 | 15 | 41 | 53 | −12 | 33 |
| 14 | Bay FC | 30 | 7 | 6 | 17 | 30 | 47 | −17 | 27 |
| 15 | Racing Louisville FC | 30 | 7 | 3 | 20 | 38 | 62 | −24 | 24 |
| 16 | Chicago Stars FC | 30 | 5 | 2 | 23 | 17 | 71 | −54 | 17 |

Source: NWSL
Rules for classification: 1) points; 2) total goal difference; 3) total wins; 4) total goals scored; 5) head-to-head points; 6) head-to-head goal goals scored; 7) fewest disciplinary points; 8) coin toss (if 2 clubs tied) or drawing of lots (if ≥3 clubs tied).

== Statistics ==
As of August 15, 2026

=== Appearances and goals ===
Starting appearances are listed first, followed by substitute appearances after the + symbol where applicable.

| No. | Pos | Nat | Player | Total | | NWSL | |
| No. | Pos | Nat | Player | Apps | Goals | Apps | Goals |
Goalkeepers
| 1 | GK | (United States) USA | Maddie Prohaska | 2 | 0 | 1+1 | 0 |
| 24 | GK | (United States) USA | Jordyn Bloomer | 18 | 0 | 18 | 0 |
| 30 | GK | (United States) USA | Erynn Floyd | 0 | 0 | 0 | 0 |
| 33 | GK | (Puerto Rico) PUR | Cristina Roque | 0 | 0 | 0 | 0 |
| 99 | GK | (United States) USA | Olivia Sekany | 0 | 0 | 0 | 0 |
Defenders
| 2 | DF | (United States) USA | Lauren Milliet | 19 | 2 | 19 | 2 |
| 3 | DF | (United States) USA | Arin Wright | 14 | 1 | 13+1 | 1 |
| 5 | DF | (United States) USA | Ellie Jean | 15 | 0 | 13+2 | 0 |
| 8 | DF | (United States) USA | Courtney Petersen | 15 | 0 | 13+2 | 0 |
| 12 | DF | (United States) USA | Quincy McMahon | 14 | 0 | 11+3 | 0 |
| 15 | DF | (United States) USA | Mirann Gacioch | 8 | 1 | 8 | 1 |
| 19 | DF | (United States) USA | Avery Ciorbu | 6 | 0 | 1+5 | 0 |
| 23 | DF | (United States) USA | Macy Philippus | 4 | 1 | 0+4 | 1 |
Midfielders
| 4 | MF | (United States) USA | Makenna Morris | 14 | 0 | 10+4 | 0 |
| 7 | MF | (United States) USA | Savannah DeMelo | 0 | 0 | 0 | 0 |
| 10 | MF | (United States) USA | Macey Hodge | 15 | 0 | 9+6 | 0 |
| 14 | MF | (United States) USA | Marisa DiGrande | 0 | 0 | 0 | 0 |
| 17 | MF | (United States) USA | Maddie Pokorny | 0 | 0 | 0 | 0 |
| 20 | MF | (United States) USA | Katie O'Kane | 19 | 3 | 17+2 | 3 |
| 22 | MF | (United States) USA | Natalie Mitchell | 0 | 0 | 0 | 0 |
| 26 | MF | (United States) USA | Taylor Flint | 17 | 3 | 15+2 | 3 |
Forwards
| 6 | FW | (United States) USA | Ella Hase | 15 | 0 | 10+5 | 0 |
| 9 | FW | (United States) USA | Kayla Fischer | 19 | 6 | 17+2 | 6 |
| 11 | FW | (United States) USA | Taylor White | 5 | 0 | 1+4 | 0 |
| 13 | FW | (United States) USA | Emma Sears | 18 | 5 | 16+2 | 5 |
| 16 | FW | (United States) USA | Maja Lardner | 14 | 2 | 2+12 | 2 |
| 21 | FW | (United States) USA | Rachel Hill | 10 | 0 | 1+9 | 0 |
| 42 | FW | (United States) USA | Sarah Weber | 16 | 3 | 11+5 | 3 |
| 88 | FW | (United States) USA | Audrey McKeen | 16 | 1 | 3+13 | 1 |

== Transactions ==
=== Transfers in ===
| Date | Player | Pos. | Previous club | Fee/notes | Ref. |
|---|---|---|---|---|---|
| January 12, 2026 | (United States) Quincy McMahon | DF | (United States) San Diego Wave FC | Trade | |
| January 14, 2026 | (United States) Maddie Prohaska | GK | (United States) Seattle Reign | Trade | |
| January 14, 2026 | (United States) Macey Hodge | MF | (United States) Angel City FC | Trade | |

=== Transfers out ===
| Date | Player | Pos. | Destination club | Fee/notes | Ref. |
|---|---|---|---|---|---|
| December 9, 2025 | (United States) Madison White | GK | (United States) North Carolina Courage | Transfer | |
| December 9, 2025 | (United States) Jordan Baggett | MF | (United States) Denver Summit FC | Free agent | |
| December 15, 2025 | (United States) Katie Atkinson | GK | (United States) Chicago Stars FC | Transfer | |
| January 6, 2026 | (Brazil) Ary Borges | FW | (United States) Angel City FC | Free agent | |
| January 9, 2026 | (Canada) Janine Sonis | DF | (United States) Denver Summit FC | Trade | |
| January 22, 2026 | (United States) Kirsten Wright | FW | | Retirement | |
| February 9, 2026 | (New Zealand) Milly Clegg | FW | | Agreed to a mutual contract termination | |
