= Taylor White (disambiguation) =

Taylor White (1701–1772) was a British jurist.

Taylor White may also refer to:

- Taylor White (goalkeeper), Guyanese footballer
- Taylor White (American soccer) (born 2004), American soccer player
