= United States women's national under-18 soccer team =

Women's national under-18 soccer team representing the United States

United States under-18
- Nickname(s): Team USA; The Stars and Stripes; The Yanks
- Association: United States Soccer Federation
- Confederation: CONCACAF (North America)
- Head coach: Toni Pressley
- FIFA code: USA
First colors	Second colors

Pan American Games
- Appearances: 1 (first in 1999)
- Best result: Gold (1999)
Medal record
Pan American Games
Gold medal – first place	1999 Winnipeg	Team

The United States U-18 women's national soccer team is a youth soccer team operated under the auspices of U.S. Soccer. Its primary role is the development of players in preparation for the senior women's national team, as well as bridging the development between the two major youth competition levels of the U-17 and the U-20.

== History ==
Between 1998 and 2001, the United States U-18 was active as the primary youth-level team. It was led by Shannon Higgins-Cirovski, the first coach in the team's history, through the middle of 1999 before she left for the Maryland Terrapins soccer team. Jay Hoffman, who served as Higgins-Cirovski's assistant, took charge of the team and led them to a gold medal for the 1999 Pan American Games, the first time the tournament was open to women's teams. Among the U-18 women playing at the 1999 Pan American Games were future senior national team members Cat Whitehill and Hope Solo.

In 2001, the United States Soccer Federation decided to change the age limit from the U-18 team to U-19. The move was in preparation for FIFA's introduction of the first ever FIFA U-19 Women's World Championship (which has since changed). The team therefore became dormant with only periodic competitions until 2019, when the Federation (under general manager Kate Markgraf) reinstated all youth-level teams in their own right.

== Competitive record ==
=== Pan American Games ===
The under-18 team participated and won the inaugural soccer tournament in the 1999 Pan American Games, while competing against full national teams. These opportunities are a consequence of holding the FIFA Women's World Cup in the same year as the Pan American Games.

Year	Result	Matches	Wins	Draws	Losses	GF	GA	Coach
(Canada) 1999	Champions	6	5	1	0	22	2	Jay Hoffman
Total	1/1	6	5	1	0	22	2	

== Fixtures and results ==
The following is a list of match results in the last 12 months, as well as any future matches that have been scheduled.

Legend Win Draw Lose Fixture

=== 2026 ===
March 3 friendly	United States	8–0	Sweden	San Pedro del Pinatar, Spain
	Kral 2'; Kocher 18'; McKeen 30', 35'; Jeakle 57', 83'; Kemmerley 74', 80'	Report		Stadium: Pinatar Arena; Attendance: 100; Referee: Mireya Lopez Reche (SPA)

March 6 friendly	United States	6–0	Hungary	San Pedro del Pinatar, Spain
	Showler-Little; Kennedy; McKeen; Fuller; Kocher; Ella Kral	Report		Stadium: Pinatar Arena

June 6 Bulgarian Nations Cup	Ukraine	0–7	United States	Plovdiv Bulgaria
		Report	Kral 50', 59', 80'; Parsons 64', 89'; Kemmerley 78'; Antonucci 90+1'	Stadium: Hristo Botev Stadium; Attendance: 40; Referee: Martin Stefanov (BUL)

June 9 Bulgarian Nations Cup	Ukraine	0–5	United States	Plovdiv, Bulgaria
		Bulgarian Football Union	Kral 17', 38'; Antonucci 35'; McKeen 66', 90'	Stadium: Stadion Hristo Botev; Referee: Antonio Autov (BUL)

== Players ==
=== Current squad ===
The following 20 players were called up for the June/July 2026 training camp.

Caps and goals are updated as of June 9, 2026 after the match against Ukraine.

No.	Pos.	Player	Date of birth (age)	Caps	Goals	Club
12	GK	Hannah Folliard	July 14, 2008 (age 18)	2	0	(United States Soccer Federation) Georgia
	GK	Elli Johnson	(17)	0	0	(United States Soccer Federation) Pittsburgh
	GK	Abby Kennedy	(17)	0	0	(United States Soccer Federation) Jacksonville FC
2	DF	Brynna Burrus	(17)	3	0	(United States Soccer Federation) Tophat SC
14	DF	Cali O'Neill	(17)	2	0	(United States Soccer Federation) North Carolina
	DF	Natalie Chudowsky	February 14, 2008 (age 18)	0	0	(United States Soccer Federation) Duke
	DF	Izzy Dalke	(17)	0	0	(United States Soccer Federation) Clemson
	DF	Maya Engel	December 28, 2008 (age 17)	0	0	(United States Soccer Federation) Virginia Development Academy
	DF	Olivia Robinson	April 30, 2008 (age 18)	1	0	(United States Soccer Federation) North Carolina
	DF	Abby Spalla	(17)	0	0	(United States Soccer Federation) Beadling SC
	DF	Vienna Whipple	(17)	1	0	(United States Soccer Federation) Crossfire Premier SC
	DF	London Young	(17)	1	0	(United States Soccer Federation) Stanford
6	MF	Brooke Bunton	June 21, 2009 (age 17)	3	0	(United States Soccer Federation) SMU
8	MF	Riley Kennedy	June 15, 2008 (age 18)	3	0	(United States Soccer Federation) North Carolina
16	MF	Chloe Sadler	(17)	2	0	(United States Soccer Federation) La Roca FC
18	MF	Scottie Antonucci	January 14, 2008 (age 18)	2	2	(United States Soccer Federation) North Carolina
	MF	Emerson Moore	(17)	0	0	(United States Soccer Federation) Richmond United SC
	MF	Anastasia Showler-Little	December 4, 2008 (age 17)	1	0	(United States Soccer Federation) PDA
11	FW	Emmy O'Donnell	(17)	2	0	(United States Soccer Federation) FC Stars Blue
	FW	Kamiya Beck	March 13, 2009 (age 17)	1	0	(United States Soccer Federation) SMU
	FW	Addison Feldman	(17)	0	0	(United States Soccer Federation) Utah Celtic FC
	FW	McKenzie Godfrey	(17)	0	0	(United States Soccer Federation) Tophat SC
	FW	Lily Jeakle	November 28, 2009 (age 16)	1	2	(United States Soccer Federation) Nationals SC
	FW	Ellie Kocher	August 5, 2008 (age 18)	1	1	(United States Soccer Federation) Penn State

=== Recent call-ups ===
The following players were named to a squad in the last 12 months.

- Bulgarian Nations Cup.
- April 2026 training camp.
- March 2026 friendlies.

Pos.	Player	Date of birth (age)	Caps	Goals	Club	Latest call-up
GK	Peyton Trayer	(17)	1	0	(United States) North Carolina	Bulgarian Nations Cup
GK	Cate Cantu	(17)	0	0	(United States) Penn Fusion SA	April 2026 training camp
DF	Ryana Dill	March 13, 2009 (age 17)	2	0	(United States) Bethesda SC	Bulgarian Nations Cup
DF	Lauren Hemann	(17)	2	0	(United States) Bethesda SC	Bulgarian Nations Cup
DF	Claire Kessenger	(17)	2	0	(United States) CE Europa Femenino	Bulgarian Nations Cup
DF	Marlee Raymond	(17)	2	0	(United States) Penn State	Bulgarian Nations Cup
DF	Gracie Milam	January 13, 2009 (age 17)	2	0	(United States) Notre Dame	Bulgarian Nations Cup
DF	Marlee Raymond	May 13, 2008 (age 18)	1	0	(United States) Penn State	April 2026 training camp
DF	Rhiannon Mahon	(17)	0	0	(United States) USC	April 2026 training camp
DF	Sophie Wyshner	(17)	0	0	(United States) North Carolina Fusion	April 2026 training camp
MF	Ella Kral	December 23, 2008 (age 17)	3	6	(United States) Lamorinda SC	Bulgarian Nations Cup
MF	Reese Canada	(17)	2	0	(United States) Notre Dame	Bulgarian Nations Cup
MF	Kamdyn Fuller	(17)	1	0	(United States) TCU	April 2026 training camp
MF	Brianna Concepcion	(17)	1	0	(United States) STA Soccer Academy	March 2026 friendlies
FW	Audrey McKeen	October 3, 2009 (age 16)	3	4	(United States) Racing Louisville	Bulgarian Nations Cup
FW	Kate Kemmerley	(17)	4	3	(United States) Penn Fusion SA	Bulgarian Nations Cup
FW	Mailee Hilburn	(17)	2	0	(United States) Seattle United	Bulgarian Nations Cup
FW	Alyssa Parsons	(17)	2	2	(United States) USC	Bulgarian Nations Cup
FW	Mikayla Cunningham	(17)	2	0	(United States) Classics Elite SA	Bulgarian Nations Cup
FW	Kyndal Shuler	(17)	1	0	(United States) Virginia	April 2026 training camp

- INJ - Injured
- PRE - Withdrew prior to camp

== Coaches ==
- (United States) Shannon Higgins-Cirovski (1998–1999)
- (United States) Jay Hoffman (1999)
- (United States) Steve Swanson (2000)
- (United States) Tracey Leone (2001)
- (England) Tracey Kevins (2019)
- (England) Mark Carr (2019)
- (United States) Chris Petrucelli (2020)
- (United States) Toni Pressley (2025)
