= Gacioch =

Gacioch is a surname. Notable people with the surname inclde:

- Mirann Gacioch (born 2003), American professional soccer player
- Rose Gacioch (1915–2004), American professional baseball player
