= Erynn Floyd =

American soccer player (born 2004)

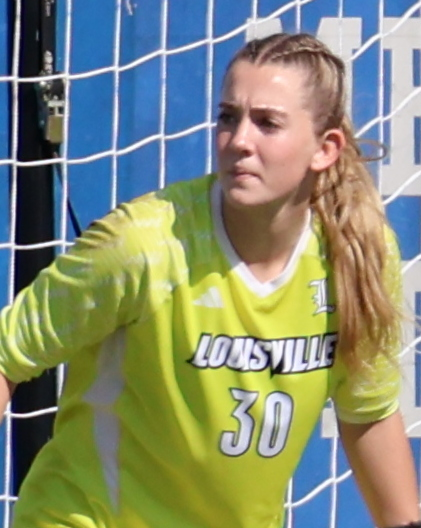
- Floyd with Louisville in 2024

Personal information
- Full name: Erynn Marie Floyd
- Date of birth: April 4, 2004 (age 22)
- Height: 5 ft 8 in (1.73 m)
- Position: Goalkeeper

Team information
- Current team: Racing Louisville
- Number: 30

Youth career
- Connecticut FC

College career
Years	Team	Apps	(Gls)
2022–2025	Louisville Cardinals	67	(0)

Senior career*
Years	Team	Apps	(Gls)
2025	Lexington SC (USLW)	5	(0)
2026–	Racing Louisville	0	(0)
- * Club domestic league appearances and goals as of 19:23, March 30, 2026 (UTC)

Erynn Marie Floyd (born April 4, 2004) is an American professional soccer player who plays as a goalkeeper for Racing Louisville FC of the National Women's Soccer League (NWSL). She played college soccer for the Louisville Cardinals.

== Early life ==
A native of Wilton, Connecticut, Floyd attended Wilton High School. She was a four-year starter for the school's varsity soccer team, earning the number one goalkeeper position from the moment she joined the squad. She led Wilton to the state quarterfinals in 2018 and 2019 before captaining the team to a state title as a senior. Over her four-season career at Wilton, she recorded 39 shutouts, was a one-time high school All-American, a two-time All-New England honoree, and a three-time All-State honoree. Floyd also played club soccer for local team Connecticut FC.

== College career ==
Floyd originally focused her college search on schools in the New England region for convenience and proximity to home. However, after a conversation with Louisville Cardinals head coach Karen Ferguson-Dayes, Floyd decided to verbally commit to the University of Louisville in April 2021 and fulfill her dream of playing in the Atlantic Coast Conference (ACC). She ended up becoming an immediate starter for the Cardinals, coming on as a substitute in only one of her 67 appearances across four years. As a sophomore in 2023, she registered a career-high 62 saves on the season. The following year, Floyd received her first conference honor, being named the ACC Defensive Player of the Week in October 2024 after recording a single-game career-high 10 saves in a shutout victory over Notre Dame. Her performance marked the first time that the Fighting Irish were held scoreless in 25 consecutive matches.

In the offseason before her senior year of college, Floyd, alongside Louisville teammate Karsyn Cherry, gained experience with Lexington SC's pre-professional USL W League team. Floyd made 5 appearances and racked up 409 minutes with Lexington.

As a senior in 2025, Floyd helped lead Louisville to a record-setting year in which the team broke program records for single-season goals and assists en route to the Cardinals' third-ever appearance in the second round of the NCAA tournament. Floyd herself had a standout season, ranking third in the ACC with 10 clean sheets and a 0.70 goals against average. In October 2025, she received her second and final ACC Defensive Player of the Week award, this time after contributing to Louisville's shutout victory over NC State.

== Club career ==
On March 27, 2026, NWSL club Racing Louisville FC announced that they had signed Floyd to her first professional contract, a one-year deal with an option for an additional season. The move reunited her with former Lexington teammate Natalie Mitchell, who had signed for Louisville earlier the same month. As the third-string goalkeeper behind Jordyn Bloomer and Maddie Prohaska, Floyd did not make any appearances in her rookie year.
