= Tom McMahon (American football) =

American football coach (born 1969)

Personal information
- Born: July 12, 1969 (age 57); Helena, Montana, U.S.

Career information
- College: Carroll College

Career history
- Carroll College (1992) Secondary; Bozeman High School (1993) Assistant; Carroll College (1994) Secondary; Utah State (1995–1997) Graduate assistant; Utah State (1998–2000) Linebackers/special teams; Utah State (2001–2005) Defensive line/recruiting coordinator; Louisville (2006) Outside linebackers/special teams; Atlanta Falcons (2007–2008) Assistant special teams coach; St. Louis Rams (2009–2011) Special teams coordinator; Kansas City Chiefs (2012) Special teams coordinator; Indianapolis Colts (2013–2017) Special teams coordinator; Denver Broncos (2018–2021) Special teams coordinator; Las Vegas Raiders (2022–2025) Special teams coordinator

Thomas Stephen McMahon (born July 12, 1969) is an American football coach. He has served as the special teams coordinator in the National Football League (NFL) for 16 seasons for teams such as the St. Louis Rams, Kansas City Chiefs, Indianapolis Colts, Denver Broncos, and Las Vegas Raiders .

== Coaching career ==
=== Early career ===
McMahon began his coaching career in 1992 as the secondary coach for the Fighting Saints of his alma mater, Carroll College. He served as an assistant coach at Bozeman High School in 1993 before returning to Carroll in 1994 in his previous role. He spent eleven years with the Utah State Aggies – first as a graduate assistant from 1995 to 1997, then as a linebackers and special teams coach from 1998 to 2000, and finally as a defensive line coach and recruiting coordinator from 2001 to 2005. He served as the outside linebackers and special teams coach of the Louisville Cardinals in 2006.

=== Atlanta Falcons ===
In 2007, McMahon began his NFL career as an assistant special teams coordinator for the Atlanta Falcons.

=== St. Louis Rams ===
From 2009 until 2011, he worked as the special teams coordinator for the St. Louis Rams.

=== Kansas City Chiefs ===
In 2012, he worked as the special teams coordinator for the Kansas City Chiefs.

=== Indianapolis Colts ===
From 2013 to 2017, McMahon worked as the Indianapolis Colts special teams coordinator.

=== Denver Broncos ===
From 2018 to 2021, McMahon was the special teams coordinator for the Denver Broncos.

=== Las Vegas Raiders ===
On February 7, 2022, McMahon joined Josh McDaniels's inaugural Las Vegas Raiders staff as the team's special teams coordinator. He remained in the role after the firings of McDaniels and Antonio Pierce as a member of Pete Carroll's staff. On November 7, 2025, McMahon was fired by the Raiders.

== Personal life ==
McMahon and his wife, Kim, have three children. Their son Emmett, nicknamed "Mitt", is a producer for The Pat McAfee Show and executive producer of the Hammer DAHN sports gambling podcast. Their daughter, Quincy, is a professional soccer player for San Diego Wave FC of the National Women's Soccer League (NWSL).
