= Audrey McKeen =

American soccer player (born 2008)

- McKeen with Racing Louisville in 2026

Personal information
- Full name: Audrey Lynn McKeen
- Date of birth: November 26, 2008 (age 17)
- Height: 5 ft 8 in (1.73 m)
- Positions: Forward; attacking midfielder

Team information
- Current team: Racing Louisville
- Number: 88

Youth career
- Loudoun SC
- 2023–2024: Northern Virginia Alliance
- 2024–2025: Virginia Development Academy

Senior career*
| Years | Team | Apps | (Gls) |
| 2026– | Racing Louisville | 25 | (1) |

International career^{‡}
| 2025 | United States U-17 | 3 | (0) |
| 2026– | United States U-18 | 1 | (2) |
| 2025– | United States U-19 | 2 | (3) |
| 2026– | United States U-20 | 4 | (0) |
- * Club domestic league appearances and goals as of 06:04, November 2, 2026 (UTC) ‡ National team caps and goals as of September 16, 2026

Audrey Lynn McKeen (born November 26, 2008) is an American professional soccer player who plays as a forward or attacking midfielder for Racing Louisville FC of the National Women's Soccer League (NWSL). She signed with Racing at age 17 in 2026.

== Early life ==
McKeen grew up in Vienna, Virginia. She played high school soccer for two seasons at Bishop O'Connell High School, in Arlington County, Virginia, where she was also an all-conference swimmer and competed in track. She scored 23 goals with 7 assists as a freshman in 2023, being named second-team All-Met by The Washington Post. She scored a program record 37 goals and added 9 assists as a sophomore in 2024, reaching the Washington Catholic Athletic Conference (WCAC) final and winning the Northern Virginia Independent Schools state title. She was named first-team All-Met, the WCAC Player of the Year, and the Virginia Gatorade Player of the Year.

McKeen played club soccer for Loudoun SC, Northern Virginia Alliance, and Virginia Development Academy, earning multiple ECNL all-conference honors and being named ECNL All-American in 2025. Before going pro, she was committed to play college soccer for the Florida State Seminoles, planning to reclassify to the class of 2026. TopDrawerSoccer ranked her as the 5th-best recruit in that class.

== Club career ==
McKeen trained with Racing Louisville FC and the Washington Spirit during the 2025 season. On January 6, 2026, Racing Louisville announced that they had signed McKeen to her first professional contract on a three-year deal, making her the club's first under-18 signing. She made her professional debut on March 14, coming on as a late substitute for Kayla Fischer in a season-opening 2–1 loss to the North Carolina Courage. On August 7, in just her second start, she scored her first professional goal against the Orlando Pride, opening the scoring with a header from Katie O'Kane's corner kick in a 3–1 victory.

== International career ==
McKeen played for the United States under-17 team in the CONCACAF qualifiers for the 2025 FIFA U-17 Women's World Cup. Later that year, she played friendlies for the under-19 team and scored three goals in two games. At age 17, she was the youngest player named to the under-20 roster for the 2026 FIFA U-20 Women's World Cup in Poland.
