= Avery Ciorbu =

American soccer player (born 2003)

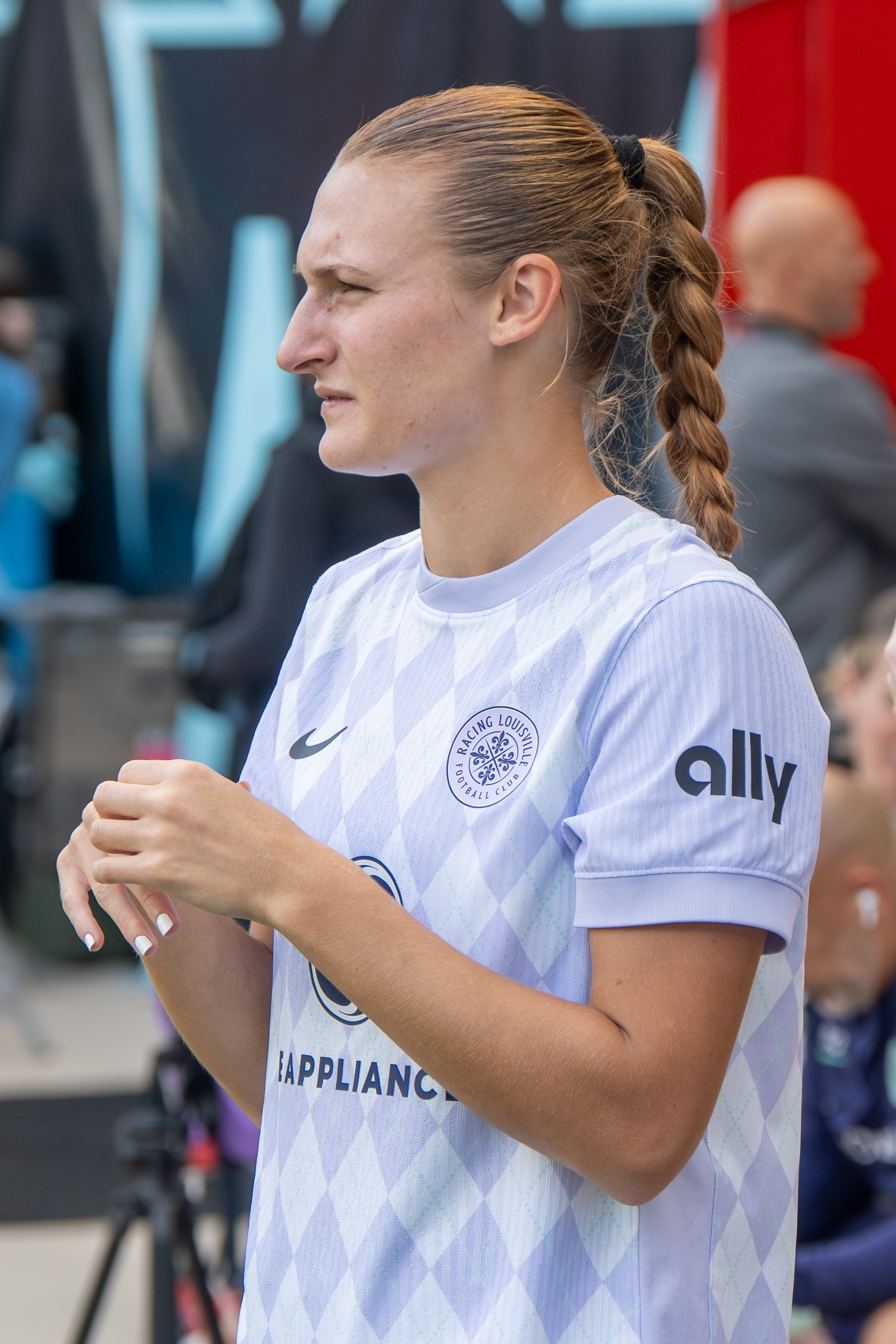
- Ciorbu with Racing Louisville in 2025

Personal information
- Full name: Avery Lynne Ciorbu
- Birth name: Avery Lynne Kalitta
- Date of birth: July 15, 2003 (age 23)
- Height: 5 ft 9 in (1.75 m)
- Positions: Defender; midfielder

Team information
- Current team: Racing Louisville
- Number: 19

Youth career
- Michigan Hawks

College career
Years	Team	Apps	(Gls)
2021–2024	Michigan Wolverines	78	(1)

Senior career*
Years	Team	Apps	(Gls)
2022–2023	Flint City AFC		
2025–	Racing Louisville	6	(0)
- * Club domestic league appearances and goals as of 05:59, November 2, 2026 (UTC)

Avery Lynne Ciorbu (née Kalitta; born July 15, 2003) is an American professional soccer player who plays as a defender or midfielder for Racing Louisville FC of the National Women's Soccer League (NWSL). She played college soccer for the Michigan Wolverines.

== Early life ==
Ciorbu grew up in Saline, Michigan, as one of multiple children born to Doug Kalitta and Josie Kalitta. She attended Washtenaw Christian Academy, where she played varsity basketball, but not soccer. Instead, she was a member of the Elite Clubs National League and played for the Michigan Hawks. She took a trip to the ECNL National Finals in 2019 and was a two-time all-conference selection.

== College career ==
Over four years, Ciorbu made 78 appearances for the Michigan Wolverines soccer program. 24 of those matches came in her freshman season, where she started 9 games. Ciorbu's performances heated up near the end of the year, helping her earn a spot on the Big Ten All-Freshman team. The next season, she was named to the Big Ten Preseason Watchlist and later cemented her spot as the Wolverines' starting defensive midfielder. She scored her first (and only) college goal in a 7–2 victory over Toledo on September 11, 2022. Ciorbu ended up starting all of Michigan's matches over the course of the season, a feat which she would also repeat in her next two years of college. She also won the Big Ten Sportsmanship Award as a sophomore and was named to the All-Big Ten third team as a junior.

Ciorbu played for Flint City AFC in the pre-professional USL W League during two consecutive college offseasons. She played in two matches in 2022, staying on for 90 minutes in both games. In her second season at Flint City, Ciorbu contributed to an undefeated regular season record and subsequent playoff qualification.

== Club career ==
On March 21, 2025, Ciorbu signed her first professional deal with Racing Louisville FC of the National Women's Soccer League. She had previously trained with the club in preseason before inking an injury replacement contract. On May 6, Ciorbu re-signed with Racing Louisville on a permanent deal lasting through the conclusion of the 2025 NWSL season. She appeared on 22 of 26 gameday rosters across the season, but did not earn a competitive appearance. On December 10, 2025, Ciorbu signed a new, one-year deal with Racing Louisville.

Ciorbu made her professional debut on March 28, 2026, coming on as a second-half substitute for Macey Hodge in a 2–1 loss to the Seattle Reign. In July 2026, she made her first professional start, playing in central midfield in a defeat to the Kansas City Current. She made four more appearances across the season, all of which were as a late-game substitute.

== Personal life ==
She married Rostik Ciorbu in January 2026.

== Career statistics ==
=== Club ===
As of November 9, 2026

Appearances and goals by club, season and competition
Club	Season	League			Cup (Note: Includes the NWSL Challenge Cup)		Playoffs (Note: Includes NWSL playoffs)		Total	
Club	Season	Division	Apps	Goals	Apps	Goals	Apps	Goals	Apps	Goals
Racing Louisville FC	2025	NWSL	0	0	—		0	0	0	0
Racing Louisville FC	2026	NWSL	6	0	—		—		6	0
Career total			6	0	0	0	0	0	6	0
