= Jay Hoffman (soccer) =

American soccer coach and former player (born 1951)

Personal information
- Full name: James Arthur Hoffman Jr.
- Date of birth: January 15, 1951 (age 75)
- Place of birth: Womelsdorf, Pennsylvania, United States
- Position: Defender

College career
Years	Team	Apps	(Gls)
1968–1971	East Stroudsbourg		

Managerial career
- 1972: East Stroudsbourg (assistant)
- 1973–1975: Alderson-Broaddus College
- 1975–1977: SUNY Fredonia
- 1978–1980: Houston Hurricane (assistant)
- 1980–1981: Edmonton Drillers (assistant)
- 1981–1982: New Jersey Rockets (assistant)
- 1982–1983: Buffalo Stallions
- 1983–1988: Cleveland Force (assistant)
- 1993: United States U17 (assistant)
- 1997: United States U20 (assistant)
- 1999: United States U18 women
- 1999: United States women (assistant)
- 2001–2002: Boston Breakers
- 2005–2006: Virginia Beach Mariners
- ‡ National team caps and goals as of 22 June 2006

James Arthur Hoffman Jr. (born January 15, 1951) is an American soccer coach and former player.

== Playing career ==
=== High school and college ===
Hoffman attended Conrad Weiser Middle School where he played polo, soccer and baseball, graduating in 1968. He then attended East Stroudsburg University of Pennsylvania playing four seasons of soccer from 1968 to 1971. He continued to attend East Stroudsbourg, working as an assistant coach until he attained his undergraduate (1972. He later earned a master's degree in Physical Education and Recreation in 1977.

=== Professional ===
Hoffman played professionally in the Canadian National Soccer League.

== Coaching ==
=== College and professional ===
He coached Alderson-Broaddus College from 1973 to 1975, then SUNY Fredonia from 1975 to 1977. He was assistant coach for the NASL's Houston Hurricanes and Edmonton Drillers. He also coached the Boston Breakers of the WUSA. The Breakers fired him on August 11, 2002. In 2005, he was hired to coach the Virginia Beach Mariners of the USL First Division.

=== National teams ===
Hoffman was an assistant coach of the United States U-17 men's side that finished seventh in the FIFA U-17 World Cup at Japan in 1993. He was head coach of the United States U-20 men's side that went to the 9th World Youth Championships at Malaysia in July 1997. He was head coach of the 1999 U.S. Women's Pan American Games team that won the gold medal, and assistant coach to the Women's National Team that won the 1999 FIFA Women's World Cup. He holds the USSF "A" license, and teaches that advanced course to other coaches. He also coached the US Paralympic soccer team from 2002 until 2015.

== Personal ==
He and his wife Susan have two children, Scott and Samantha. Hoffman is an avid golfer.
