= Mirann Gacioch =

American soccer player (born 2003)

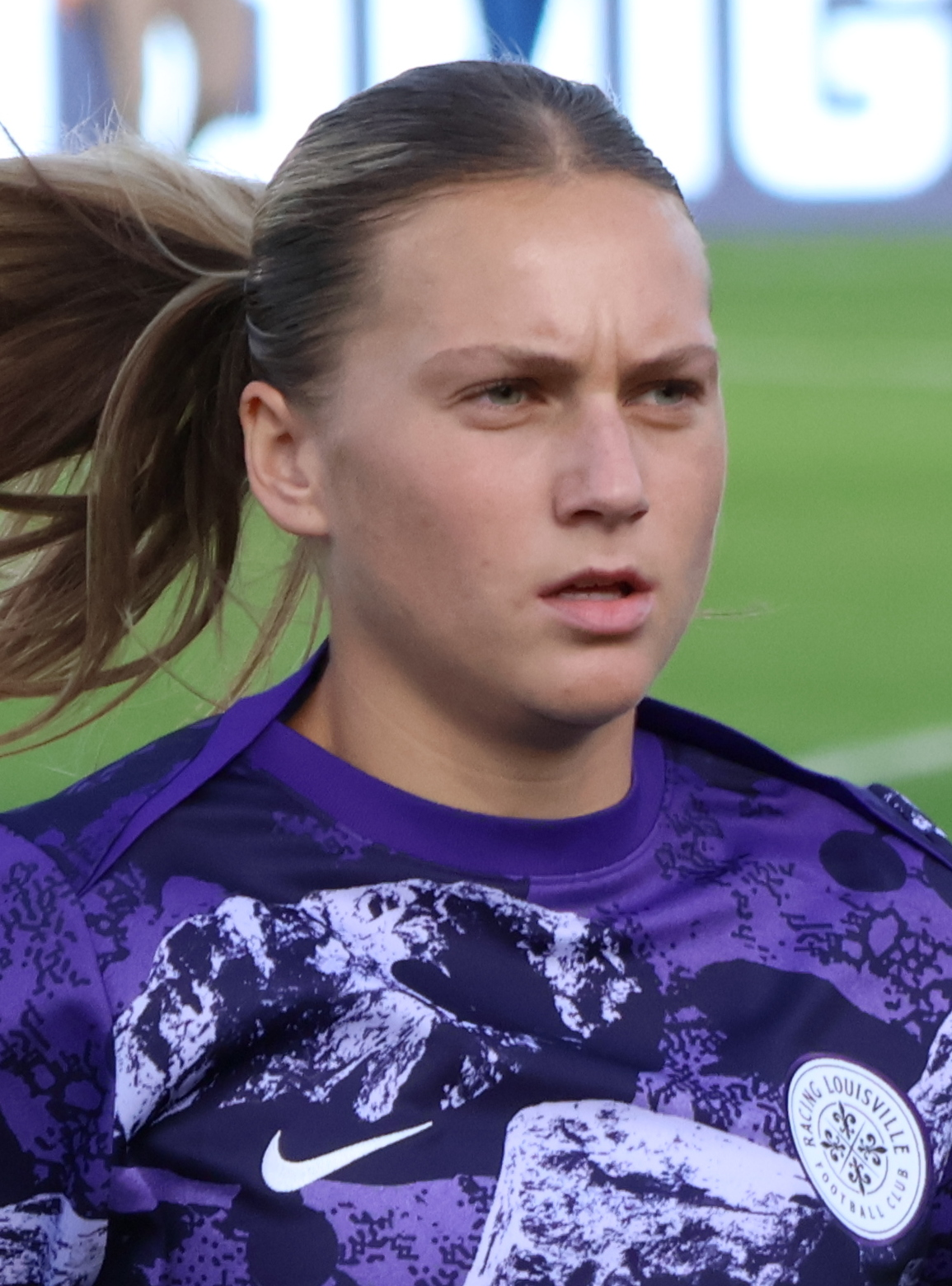
- Gacioch with Racing Louisville in 2026

Personal information
- Full name: Mirann Sienna Gacioch
- Date of birth: October 30, 2003 (age 23)
- Height: 5 ft 5 in (1.65 m)
- Position: Defender

Team information
- Current team: Racing Louisville
- Number: 15

Youth career
- Western New York Flash

College career
Years	Team	Apps	(Gls)
2022–2025	Ohio State Buckeyes	83	(0)

Senior career*
Years	Team	Apps	(Gls)
2026–	Racing Louisville	18	(1)
- * Club domestic league appearances and goals as of 05:58, November 2, 2026 (UTC)

Mirann Sienna Gacioch (born October 30, 2003) is an American professional soccer player who plays as a defender for Racing Louisville FC of the National Women's Soccer League (NWSL). She played college soccer for the Ohio State Buckeyes, earning fourth-team All-American honors in 2025.

== Early life ==
Gacioch is a native of West Falls, New York. She played eleven years of club soccer for the Western New York Flash Academy, eventually ascending to the role of club captain. She guided the Flash to three Elite Clubs National League National Championship appearances and one national top eight finish. In 2021, she was a member of the Flash squad that won the North American Cup.

Gacioch attended the Nichols School, a private school in Buffalo. Operating as an offensive-minded defender, she led the soccer team to four straight division championship games and one title in 2018. In 2021, she was named a high school All-American. As a defender, and team captain, Gacioch tallied 136 points in her high school soccer career while also participating in basketball, where she was a two-year starter, and in track, where she led the team in points and was the MVP. She still holds the All Sita Mile record time which she set prior to her high school years.

Outside of sports, Gacioch was elected student body co-president at Nichols for the 2021–22 school year, in which capacity she served as head of the school's student council. She had previously served as co-president of her class.

== College career ==
As a freshman with the Ohio State Buckeyes in 2022, Gacioch started in the back line with Talani Barnett, Sydney Jones, and Olivia Sensky. After starting in all but one of her 16 appearances and helping the Buckeyes record 9 shutouts, she was named to the Big Ten Conference's All-Freshman Team for her performances. The following year, Gacioch (starting 18 of 19 matches) continued to be a part of Ohio State's starting lineup; she also made two assists on the season.

As a junior in 2024, Gacioch was elected as one of the Buckeyes' three co-captains. She led the team to the Sweet 16 of the NCAA tournament before losing to Wake Forest. In August 2024, she started a streak of playing every single minute for Ohio State that would go on to span 41 matches and the entirety of her senior year. Gacioch's senior season was her most successful, as she earned All-Big Ten and All-Region First Team honors for the first time. Playing every minute of these 22 matches, Gacioch led Ohio State to the NCAA Elite Eight, where they were vanquished by eventual champions Florida State. Gacioch and the rest of the Buckeyes' defense set a program record for the most consecutive shutouts, with seven, as well as a record for straight shut out minutes. Gacioch appeared in 83 total matches in her time at Ohio State.

== Club career ==
On January 9, 2026, National Women's Soccer League club Racing Louisville FC announced that they had signed Gacioch to her first professional contract, a one-year deal with a mutual option for a second season. Gacioch made her pro debut on March 20, 2026, stepping into the starting lineup for the injured Quincy McMahon in Louisville's season-opener against the Washington Spirit. In her sixth NWSL appearance, she netted her first professional goal, heading in a cross from Arin Wright to open the scoring in a 2–1 victory over the Chicago Stars on August 1. After becoming a regular in the Racing starting lineup by the second half of the year, she signed a new contract with the club in October 2026 lasting through the 2028 season. She started in all but one of her 18 appearances as a rookie.

== Career statistics ==
=== Club ===
As of November 15, 2026

Appearances and goals by club, season and competition
Club	Season	League			Cup		Playoffs (Note: Includes NWSL playoffs)		Total	
Club	Season	Division	Apps	Goals	Apps	Goals	Apps	Goals	Apps	Goals
Racing Louisville FC	2026	NWSL	18	1	—		—		18	1
Career total			18	1	0	0	0	0	18	1

== Honors and awards ==
Individual

- Fourth-Team All-American: 2025
- First-Team All-Big Ten: 2025
- Big Ten All-Freshman Team: 2022
