= Maddie Pokorny =

American soccer player (born 1996)

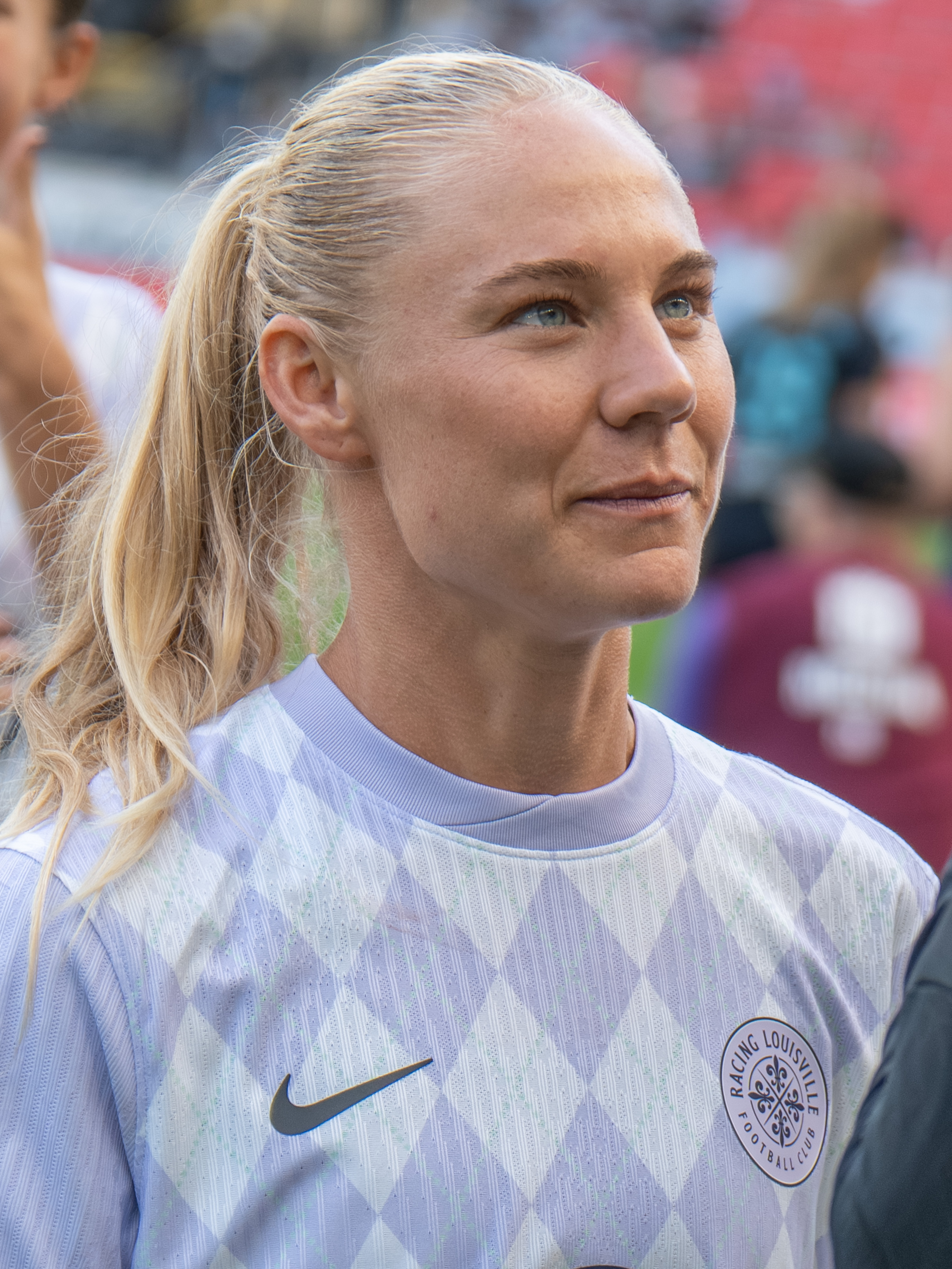
- Pokorny with Racing Louisville 2025

Personal information
- Full name: Madalyn Ann Pokorny
- Date of birth: November 24, 1996 (age 29)
- Height: 5 ft 3 in (1.60 m)
- Positions: Winger; fullback; attacking midfielder

Team information
- Current team: Racing Louisville
- Number: 17

College career
Years	Team	Apps	(Gls)
2015–2018	Saint Louis Billikens	82	(24)

Senior career*
Years	Team	Apps	(Gls)
2019	Chicago Red Stars	0	(0)
2020–2023	HB Køge	64	(23)
2023–	Racing Louisville	20	(0)
2026	→ Tampa Bay Sun (loan)	11	(0)
- * Club domestic league appearances and goals as of 03:46, May 18, 2026 (UTC)

Madalyn Ann Pokorny (born November 24, 1996) is an American professional soccer player who plays as a winger or fullback for Racing Louisville FC of the National Women's Soccer League (NWSL). She formerly played for the Chicago Red Stars and Danish club HB Køge.

== Early life ==
Growing up in the area of St. Louis, Missouri, Pokorny attended Webster Groves High School. At Webster Groves, she captained the team for two years and graduated holding the school record for goals scored. She earned numerous conference and state honors during her tenure.

== College career ==
Pokorny played four years for the Saint Louis Billikens women's soccer team. She was a three-time A-10 All-Conference selection and was named the A-10 Championship Most Outstanding Player at the 2018 Atlantic 10 Conference women's soccer tournament after scoring four goals and helping her team win the league title.

Pokorny finished her college career as one of the most accomplished players in Saint Louis program history, ranking third in shots, fourth in starts and sixth in goals and games played.

== Club career ==
=== Chicago Red Stars ===
In 2019, Pokorny signed with the Chicago Red Stars as a National Team Replacement Player. She did not make an appearance for Chicago.

=== HB Køge ===
Before the 2020 season in the Danish Kvindeligaen, Pokorny signed with HB Køge. She helped the club win three consecutive Danish Women's League titles and qualify for the UEFA Women's Champions League. Pokorny scored the team's first Champions League group stage goal in a defeat away to Arsenal. She scored 26 goals in 79 appearances across all competitions with HB Køge, including 22 in league play.

=== Racing Louisville ===
In June 2023, Pokorny signed as a National Team Replacement Player with Racing Louisville with the departures of six of the club's players to the 2023 FIFA Women's World Cup. She made her first NWSL assist in a 1–1 draw on August 19, 2023, vs. Angel City. Pokorny signed a two-year contract with Racing in November 2023.

On January 23, 2026, Racing Louisville announced that they had re-signed Pokorny to a one-year contract, subsequently loaning her out to USL Super League club Tampa Bay Sun FC for the first half of the 2026 NWSL season.
