= Quincy McMahon =

American soccer player (born 2002)

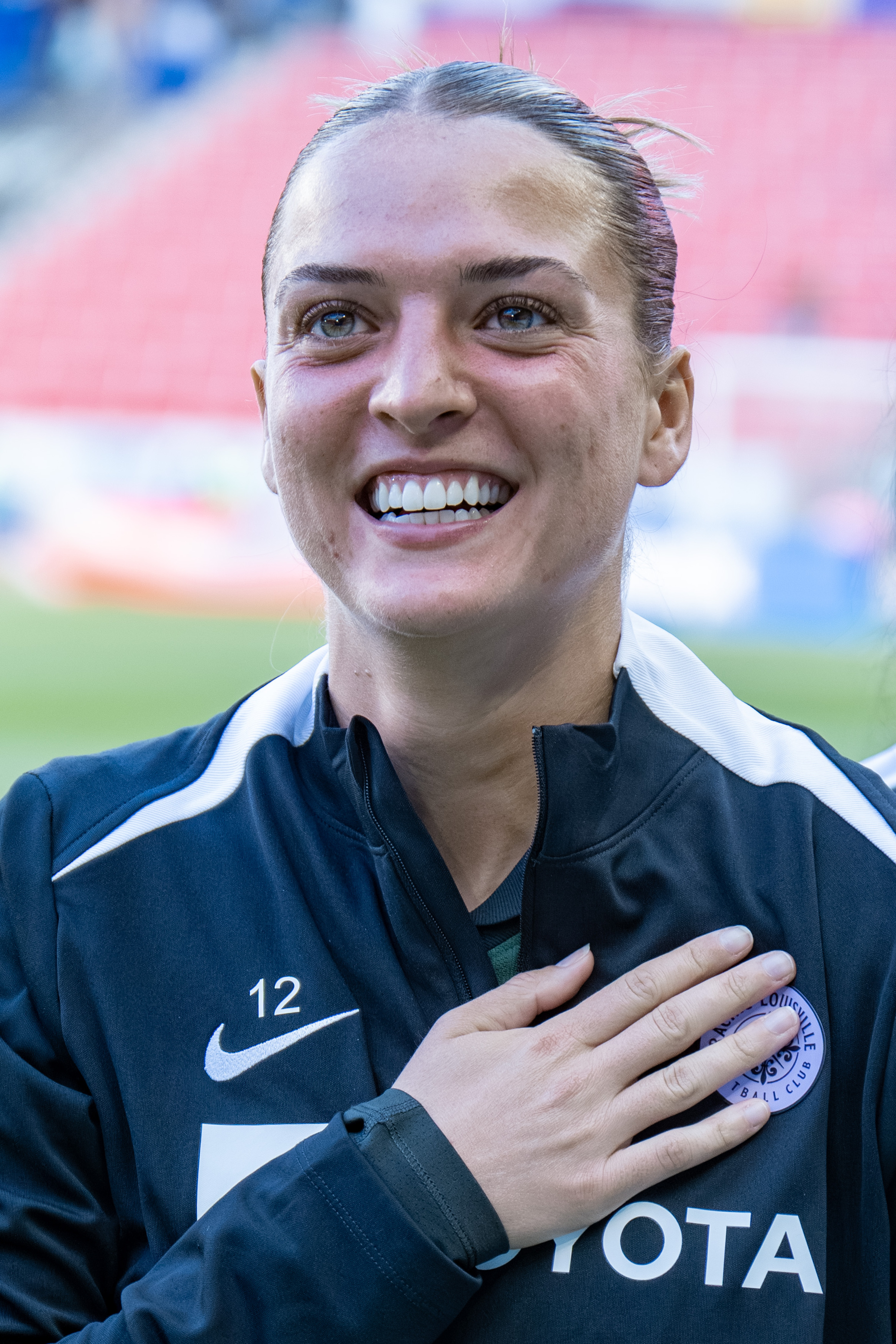
- McMahon with Racing Louisville in 2026

Personal information
- Full name: Quincy Marie McMahon
- Date of birth: September 26, 2002 (age 24)
- Place of birth: Logan, Utah, United States
- Height: 5 ft 7 in (1.70 m)
- Position: Fullback

Team information
- Current team: Racing Louisville
- Number: 12

College career
Years	Team	Apps	(Gls)
2021–2024	UCLA Bruins	86	(8)

Senior career*
Years	Team	Apps	(Gls)
2025	San Diego Wave	7	(0)
2026–	Racing Louisville	25	(0)

International career^{‡}
2020	United States U-18	3	(0)
2020	United States U-19	3	(1)
2019	United States U-20	2	(0)
- * Club domestic league appearances and goals as of 05:58, November 2, 2026 (UTC) ‡ National team caps and goals as of March 8, 2020

Quincy Marie McMahon (born September 26, 2002) is an American professional soccer player who plays as a fullback for Racing Louisville FC of the National Women's Soccer League (NWSL). She played college soccer for the UCLA Bruins, winning the 2022 national championship. She began her professional career with the San Diego Wave in 2025.

== Early life ==
McMahon was born in Logan, Utah, to Kim (née Sullivan) and Tom McMahon, and has two older brothers. Her father most recently served as the special teams coordinator for the Las Vegas Raiders in the National Football League (NFL). McMahon attended Valor Christian High School in Highlands Ranch, Colorado, for two years before moving to Guerin Catholic High School in Carmel, Indiana. In her senior year of high school, she posted 19 goals and 21 assists and received Indiana's state Gatorade Player of the Year and United Soccer Coaches All-American honors. She played club soccer for Indiana Fire Juniors.

== College career ==
McMahon played for the UCLA Bruins from 2021 to 2024, scoring 8 goals and providing 26 assists in 86 appearances (78 starts). She moved into the starting lineup by the end of her freshman season, earning Pac-12 Conference all-freshman honors as UCLA went undefeated to win the conference title before an NCAA tournament first-round upset. In her sophomore season, she started every game and was named first-team All-Pac-12, helping keep 13 clean sheets in 23 games. She helped lead UCLA to the 2022 national championship, playing every minute of their comeback from 2–0 down against North Carolina to win 3–2 in the title game.

In her junior season in 2023, McMahon played the second-most minutes on the team and became the first player to receive four Pac-12 Defensive Player of the Week honors in a season, also repeating as first-team All-Pac-12. She led the team with 7 assists as they kept 11 clean sheets in 19 games. While they again won the Pac-12 title, they were also again upset in the NCAA tournament first round. In her senior season, with the program's move to the Big Ten Conference, she matched her sophomore total of 3 goals and a team-high 6 assists. She was named to the All-Big Ten second team, helping UCLA win its new conference tournament for the first time. During her years at UCLA, head coach Margueritte Aozasa mostly used McMahon at left back but occasionally put her on the right or up forward when needed.

== Club career ==
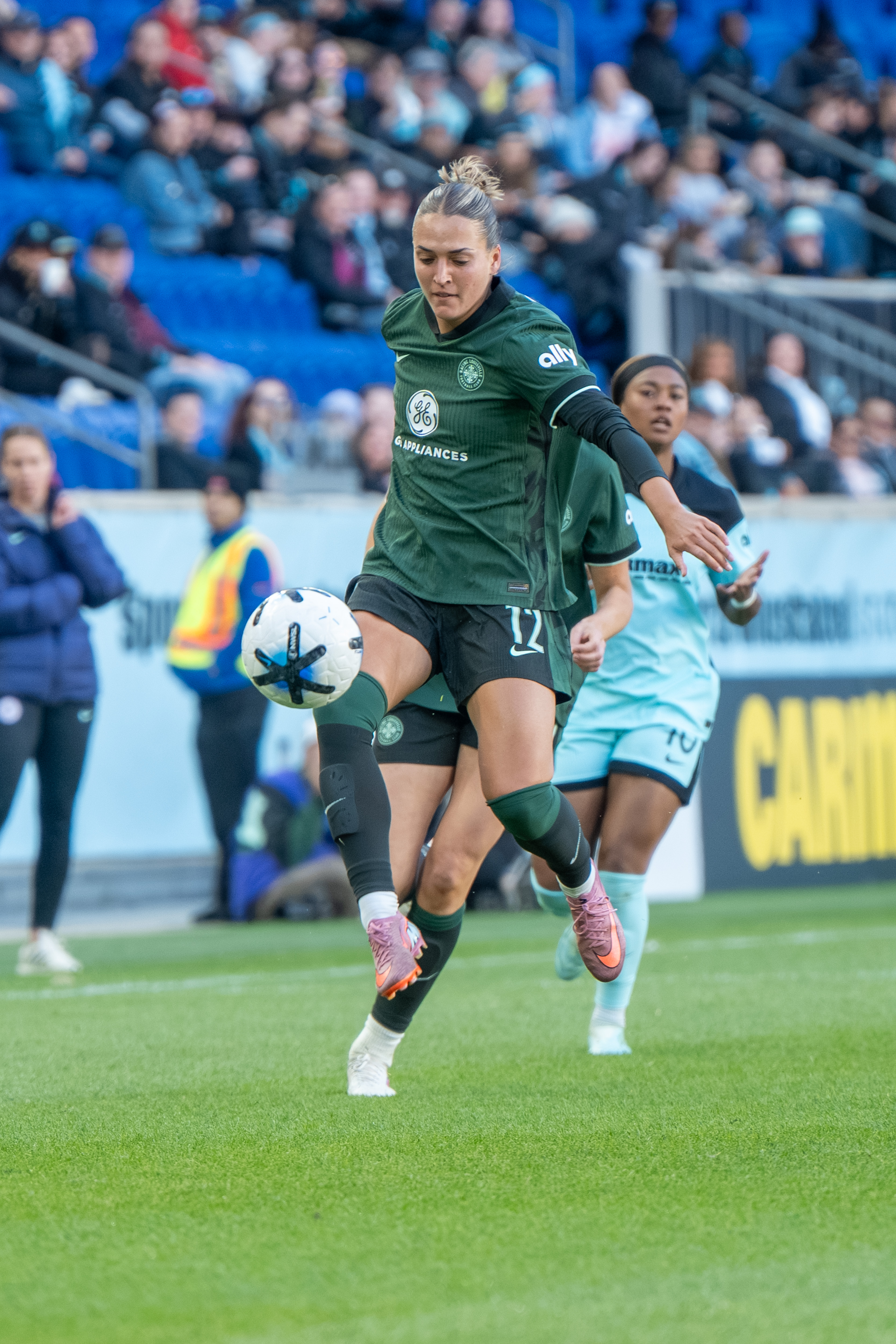
McMahon with Racing Louisville in 2026

=== San Diego Wave ===
San Diego Wave FC announced on December 13, 2024, that they had signed McMahon to her first professional contract on a three-year deal. She was the second college player, after new teammate Trinity Byars, to enter the NWSL after the abolition of the college draft. She made her professional debut as a stoppage-time substitute for Hanna Lundkvist in a 2–1 defeat to the Orlando Pride on March 29, 2025. She made 7 regular-season appearances exclusively as a late substitute in her rookie season as the Wave finished sixth in the standings. In the playoff quarterfinals, she played a season-high 19 minutes in a 1–0 extra-time loss to the Portland Thorns.

=== Racing Louisville ===
On January 12, 2026, McMahon was traded to Racing Louisville FC in exchange for US$25,000 in allocation money and international roster sports for the next two seasons.

== International career ==
McMahon played for the United States at the under-18, under-19, under-20, and under-23 levels.

== Honors and awards ==
UCLA Bruins

- NCAA Division I women's soccer tournament: 2022
- Pac-12 Conference: 2021, 2023
- Big Ten women's soccer tournament: 2024

Individual

- First-team All-Pac-12: 2022, 2023
- Second-team All-Big Ten: 2024
- Pac-12 all-freshman team: 2021
