= Natalie Mitchell =

American soccer player (born 2004)

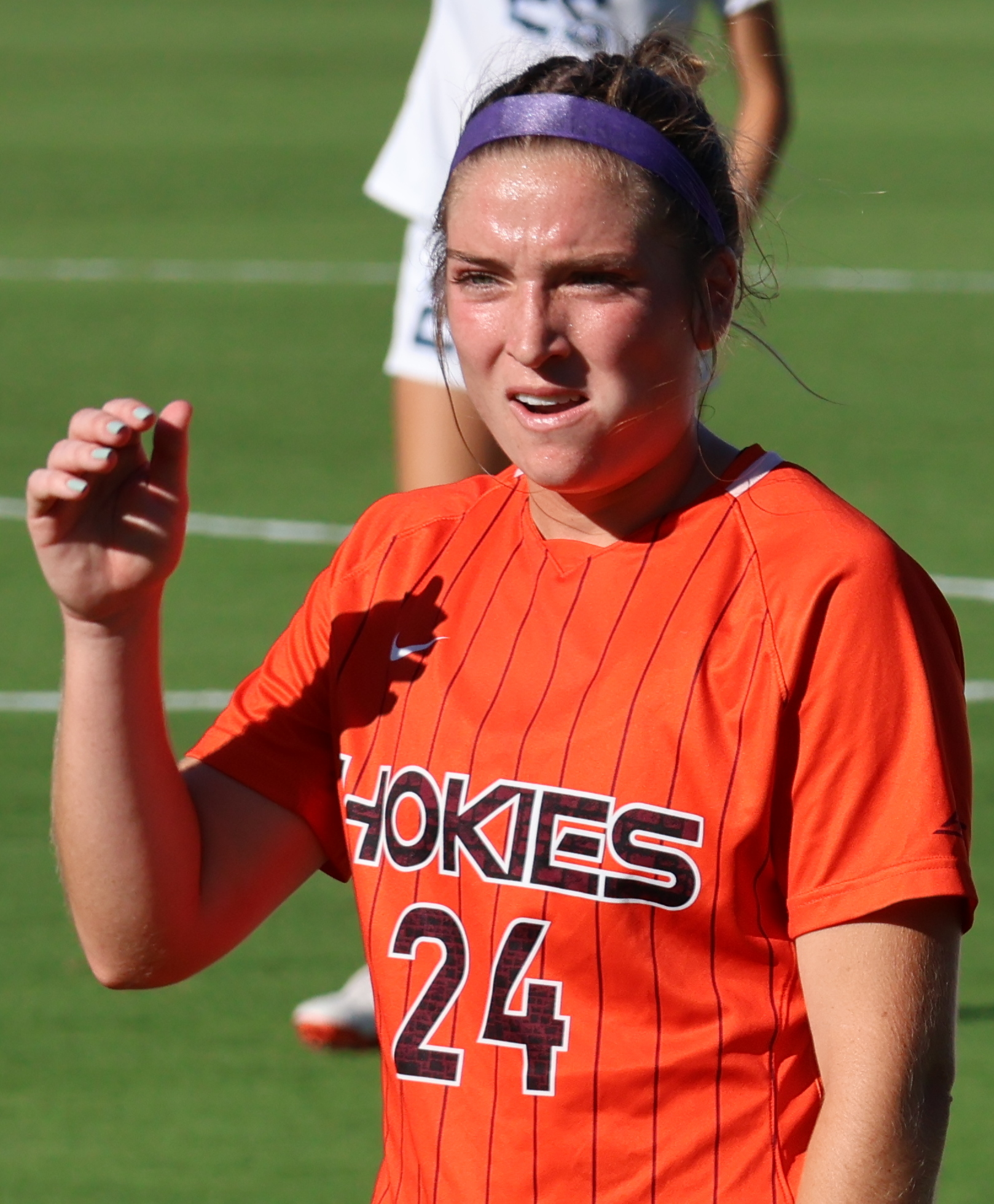
- Mitchell with Virginia Tech in 2023

Personal information
- Date of birth: January 6, 2004 (age 22)
- Place of birth: Temecula, California, U.S.
- Height: 5 ft 8 in (1.73 m)
- Position: Midfielder

Team information
- Current team: Racing Louisville
- Number: 22

Youth career
- Arsenal FC Sporting
- 2021: San Diego Surf

College career
Years	Team	Apps	(Gls)
2022–2025	Virginia Tech Hokies	78	(24)

Senior career*
Years	Team	Apps	(Gls)
2024	Indy Eleven	11	(7)
2025	Lexington SC (USLW)	8	(4)
2026–	Racing Louisville	0	(0)
- * Club domestic league appearances and goals as of 06:13, March 15, 2026 (UTC)

Natalie Mitchell (born January 6, 2004) is an American professional soccer player who plays as a midfielder for Racing Louisville FC of the National Women's Soccer League (NWSL). She played college soccer for the Virginia Tech Hokies.

== Early life ==
Mitchell was born and raised in Temecula, California. She attended Temecula Valley High School, where she earned four varsity letters in track and three in soccer. With the soccer team, she had a breakout season in her senior year, setting a program record with 35 goals on the season, captaining Temecula Valley to a 21-match winning streak, and leading the team to a California Interscholastic Federation state title. In the state championship match, she scored both of Temecula Valley's goals against Santiago to secure the trophy. She was named the CIF Southern Player of the Year for her performances. Outside of school, Mitchell played four years for Murrieta-based club team Arsenal FC Sporting, where she was a prolific goalscorer and won multiple cup titles. In 2021, she switched to San Diego Surf SC, where she recorded 5 hat-tricks and one five-goal game in her lone season.

== College career ==
Originally, Mitchell had accepted a scholarship to play soccer at East Carolina University. She later changed courses and instead played four seasons for the Virginia Tech Hokies, starting every game across her collegiate career. Fifteen minutes into her Virginia Tech debut in 2022, she assisted Tori Powell to produce the Hokies' first goal of the season. On August 28, 2022, she scored her first college goal in a match against Elon. Mitchell went on to play the most minutes out of any freshman on Virginia Tech. Her 8 assists were the fourth-highest in the Atlantic Coast Conference (ACC). TopDrawerSoccer named Mitchell to its 2022 Freshman Best XI Second Team.

As a sophomore in 2023, Mitchell led Virginia Tech with 9 goals and was named to the All-ACC third team. The following year, she registered 5 goals and 6 assists, with two of her assists coming in the Hokies' first win over Florida State in program history. In the first and second rounds of the NCAA tournament, Mitchell scored back-to-back game winners, first against Tennessee, and then against UCLA. She then played in both of Virginia Tech's remaining two matches as the Hokies were eliminated by Duke in the elite eight. She was named to the All-Atlantic Region fourth team for her efforts. Mitchell went on to play one more year for Virginia Tech, finishing 2025 with over 5,000 career minutes of play across all seasons.

== Club career ==
In the offseason before her junior year of college, Mitchell played for Indy Eleven of the pre-professional USL W League. She was Indy Eleven's 2024 leading goalscorer, also netting the game-winner in the club's playoff victory over the Minnesota Aurora. The following year, she returned to the USL W League, making 8 appearances and scoring 4 goals for Lexington SC's USLW squad.

On March 11, 2026, NWSL club Racing Louisville FC announced that they had signed Mitchell to her first professional contract on a one-year deal.

== Personal life ==
She is the daughter of Spike and Julie Mitchell. She has two brothers, Jordan and Jake Mitchell, the latter of whom was a first-team All-American for Oregon Tech's soccer team in the NAIA. Mitchell studied criminology at Virginia Tech and hopes to join the FBI after her soccer career concludes.

== Honors ==
Individual

- Third-team All-ACC: 2023
