= Katie O'Kane =

American soccer player (born 2002)

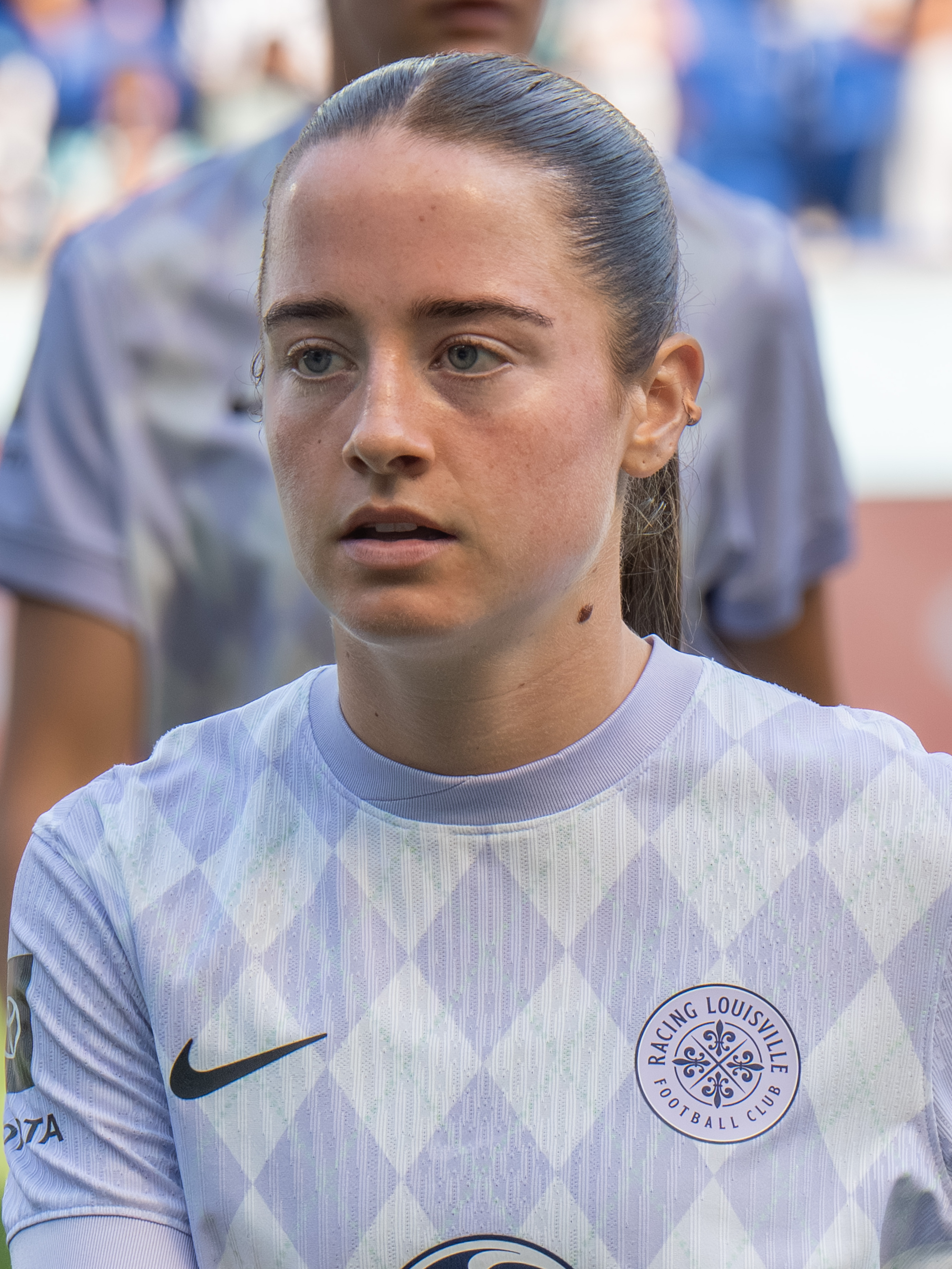
- O'Kane with Racing Louisville in 2025

Personal information
- Full name: Katherine Susanna O'Kane
- Date of birth: January 18, 2002 (age 24)
- Height: 5 ft 4 in (1.63 m)
- Position: Midfielder

Team information
- Current team: Racing Louisville
- Number: 20

Youth career
- Reign FC Academy

College career
Years	Team	Apps	(Gls)
2021	Washington Huskies	29	(1)
2022–2024	Utah Utes	54	(16)

Senior career*
Years	Team	Apps	(Gls)
2024	Oakland Soul	5	(1)
2025–	Racing Louisville	56	(5)
- * Club domestic league appearances and goals as of 06:07, November 2, 2026 (UTC)

Katherine Susanna O'Kane (born January 18, 2002) is an American professional soccer player who plays as a midfielder for Racing Louisville FC of the National Women's Soccer League (NWSL). She played college soccer for the Washington Huskies and the Utah Utes.

== Early life ==
O'Kane was raised in Seattle, playing for the Reign FC academy in her youth. Both of her parents are former Dartmouth athletes, with her mother competing in cross-country skiing and her father playing football. O'Kane attended Bishop Blanchet High School, where, as a freshman, she helped the soccer team reach the state semifinals for the first time in over two decades. In the same year, she was awarded with All-Metro and All-State honors for her efforts. Throughout the entirety of her high school career, O'Kane was also twice named to the All-Region tournament team. She played for the Washington ODP team and led the program in scoring.

== College career ==
=== Washington Huskies ===
As a high school freshman, O'Kane verbally committed to the University of Washington. She started playing with the Huskies soccer team in 2021 and ended up playing in 29 games throughout her time with Washington, starting 2. O'Kane scored her first college goal and only as a Husky on September 5, 2021, netting a long-range strike in a 2–1 defeat to New Mexico. She transferred out of Washington ahead of 2022.

=== Utah Utes ===
In her first season with her new team, the Utah Utes, O'Kane started all 19 of the squad's matches. She built upon her success the following year, becoming a goalscoring threat and leading the team in both goals and points. She was named Pac-12 Offensive Player of the Week in October 2023 after registering a hat-trick in a 4–2 victory over Oregon.

In the summer leading up to her senior year of college, O'Kane played for Oakland Soul SC of the pre-professional USL W League. Oakland finished second in the league's Nor Cal division and advanced to the playoffs. Upon arriving back to Utah, O'Kane was part of the first Utes squad to play in the Big 12 Conference. She was the lone goalscorer in Utah's first ever Big 12 victory, against Arizona State on September 12. Just as she had done two years previously, O'Kane finished her senior season having played in all 19 games. She was also second for the Utes in goals and assists.

== Club career ==
After graduating from Utah, O'Kane trained with National Women's Soccer League team Racing Louisville FC in the 2025 preseason as a non-roster invitee. She signed a one-year contract with Louisville on February 21, 2025, and was noted to have changed positions from forward to midfielder. O'Kane became the first Ute to join the NWSL following the abolition of the league's college draft. She made her professional debut on March 15, coming on as a second-half substitute for Janine Sonis in Louisville's season-opening draw with the North Carolina Courage. Two games later, O'Kane made her first start with Racing Louisville, in a match versus the Chicago Stars. O'Kane continued to gain playing time over the first half of 2025, appearing in each of Louisville's matches and registering one assist. On July 1, she re-signed with Louisville through the 2027 season. O'Kane netted her first professional goal on September 5, opening the scoring in a 2–1 loss to the Portland Thorns. She ended up starring in all 26 regular season games for Louisville as the club eventually advanced to the playoffs for the first time in history. During the match, O'Kane started and played 85 minutes as Racing were eventually defeated on penalties.

O'Kane scored her first career brace on May 8, 2026, netting her first two goals of the season in a 3–1 victory over league leaders Portland Thorns FC. Her second of the two goals, a curling strike from a direct free kick, was voted the NWSL Goal of the Week. In August 2026, she registered both a goal and an assist in a win over the Boston Legacy. She appeared in all of Racing's matches for the second year in a row and ranked second on the team in minutes (behind only Lauren Milliet) as Louisville finished second-to-last, failing to qualify for the playoffs.

== International career ==
O'Kane was called up to the United States under-23 team, for a training camp concurrent with the senior national team, in October 2025.

== Career statistics ==
=== Club ===
As of November 9, 2026

Appearances and goals by club, season and competition
Club	Season	League			Cup		Playoffs (Note: Includes NWSL playoffs)		Total	
Club	Season	Division	Apps	Goals	Apps	Goals	Apps	Goals	Apps	Goals
Racing Louisville FC	2025	NWSL	26	1	—		1	0	27	1
Racing Louisville FC	2026	NWSL	30	4	—		—		30	4
Career total			56	5	0	0	0	0	57	5
