= Ellie Jean =

American soccer player (born 1997)

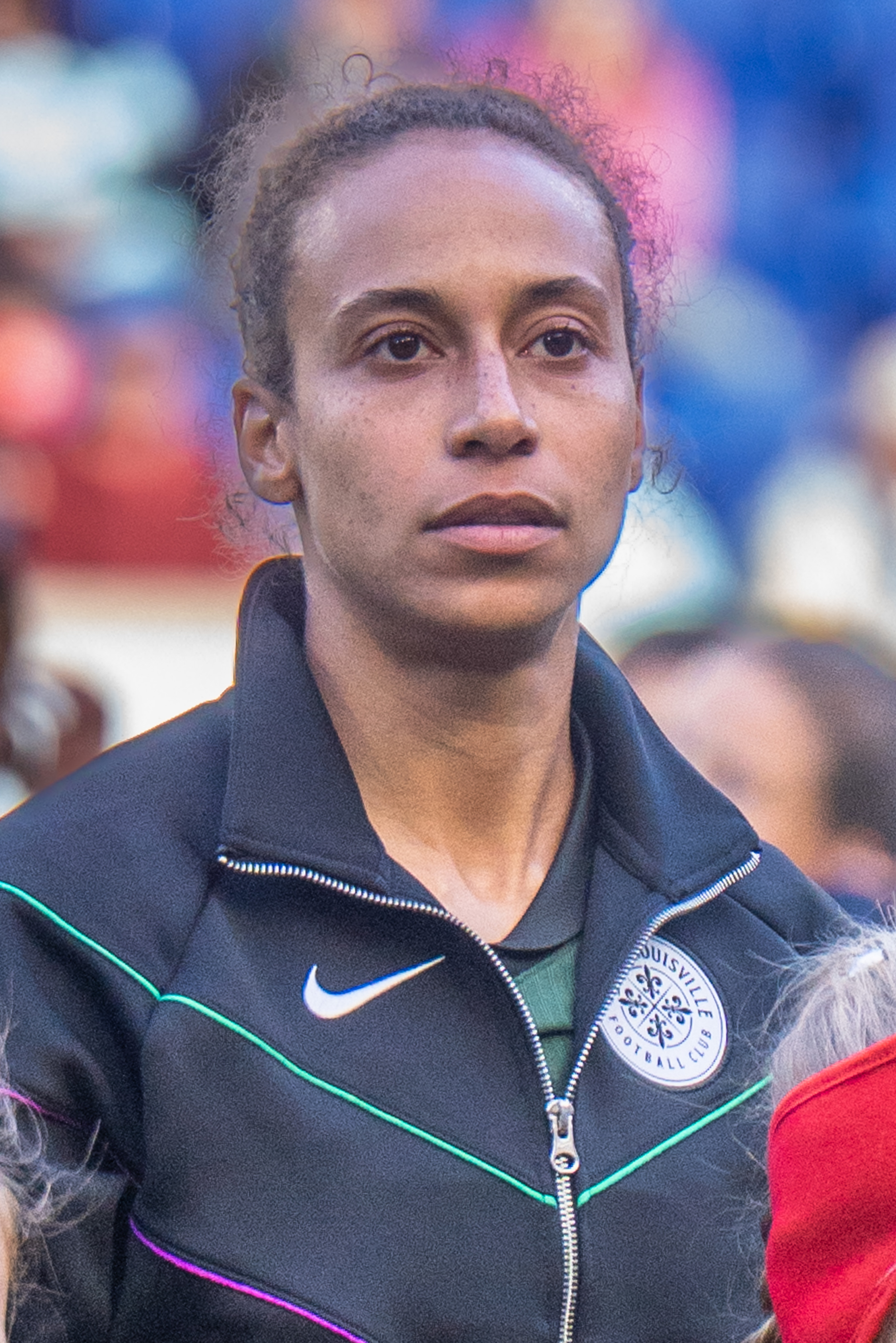
- Jean with Racing Louisville in 2026

Personal information
- Full name: Elisabeth Charlotte Jean
- Date of birth: January 31, 1997 (age 29)
- Place of birth: Chattanooga, Tennessee, United States
- Height: 5 ft 6 in (1.68 m)
- Position: Center back

Team information
- Current team: Racing Louisville FC
- Number: 5

Youth career
- Oakwood SC

College career
Years	Team	Apps	(Gls)
2015–2018	Penn State Nittany Lions	100	(8)

Senior career*
Years	Team	Apps	(Gls)
2018–2019	New England Mutiny		
2020	FC Nordsjælland		
2020–2022	PSV Eindhoven	22	
2022–2023	NJ/NY Gotham FC	32	(0)
2024–	Racing Louisville FC	54	(1)

International career^{‡}
2013	United States U17		
2016	United States U20		
2017–2018	United States U23		
- * Club domestic league appearances and goals as of 05:57, November 2, 2026 (UTC) ‡ National team caps and goals as of June 10, 2023

Elisabeth Charlotte Jean (born January 31, 1997) is an American professional soccer player who plays as a center back for Racing Louisville FC of the National Women's Soccer League (NWSL).

== Early life ==
Jean was born in Chattanooga, Tennessee, and grew up in Coventry, Connecticut. As a child, she practiced gymnastics before taking up soccer, initially at Northeast United. At age 13, she moved teams to youth soccer club Oakwood SC in Glastonbury, Connecticut, where she played for five years. She attended Coventry High School but did not play soccer for the school, instead competing in cross country running. The Hartford Courant named her its cross country runner of the year in her senior year.

== College career ==
In the 2015 season, Jean was credited with six assists in 26 matches played for the Nittany Lions, and the team won the national championship. She redshirted in her sophomore season to play for the United States women's national under-20 soccer team at the 2016 FIFA U-20 Women's World Cup. Jean finished her Penn State career in 2018 with 100 appearances, one goal, and eight assists.

== Club career ==
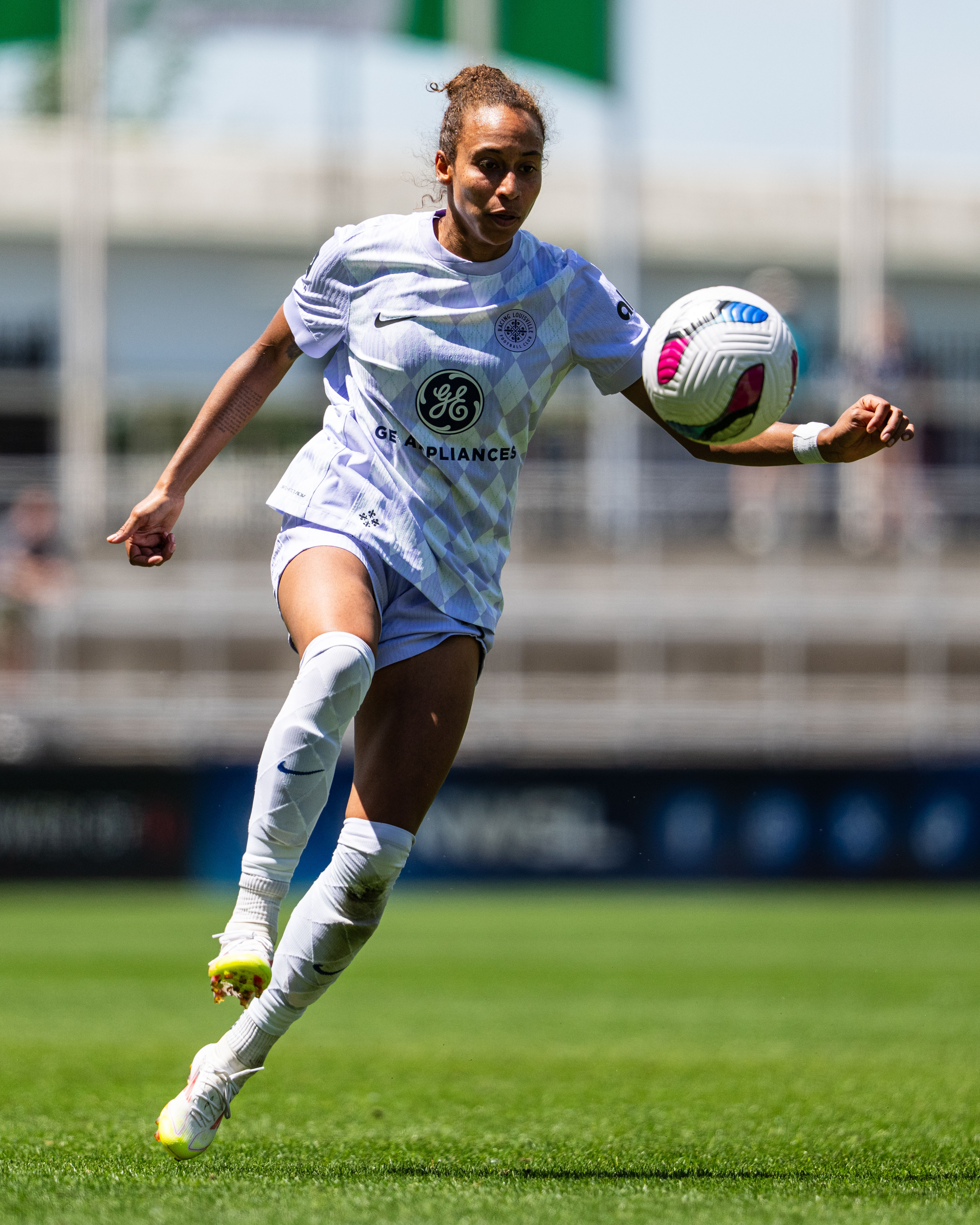
Jean with Racing Louisville in 2025

Jean played for the New England Mutiny of United Women's Soccer in 2018 and 2019.

=== FC Nordsjælland, 2020 ===
Jean opted not to register for the 2020 NWSL College Draft.

On January 14, 2020, Jean signed a contract with semi-professional Danish club FC Nordsjælland of the Danish Women's League. However, due to the impact of the COVID-19 pandemic on sports, all sport in Denmark was locked down and banned on March 6, 2020, suspending the 2019–20 season. Jean returned to the United States in March.

=== PSV Eindhoven, 2020–2022 ===
On May 1, 2020, Jean was transferred to Dutch club PSV Eindhoven and signed a two-year contract with the club. She appeared in 22 league matches for PSV, and four matches of the team's 2020–21 UEFA Women's Champions League campaign, debuting in the European competition in December 2020 in a 1–4 loss to FC Barcelona.

=== NJ/NY Gotham FC, 2022–2023 ===
On January 31, 2022, NWSL club NJ/NY Gotham FC paid an undisclosed transfer fee to acquire Jean from PSV with six months remaining on her contract with the Dutch club. Gotham signed her to a one-year contract with an option for an additional year.

In 2023, newly appointed Gotham FC coach Juan Carlos Amorós shifted Jean from her traditional role as a fullback to center back, pairing her with Ali Krieger. Gotham FC would go on to win the NWSL Championship.

=== Racing Louisville FC, 2024– ===
On December 12, 2023 Gotham FC traded Jean to expansion team Bay FC in exchange for 2024 NWSL Expansion Draft protection. On December 18, Jean was traded to Racing Louisville FC.

== International career ==
Jean was called into camp for the United States under-15 team in October 2012.

On September 25, 2013, Jean was named to the United States under-17 roster for the 2013 CONCACAF Women's U-17 Championship. Jean captained the team at the tournament.

In 2016, Jean started in all six matches for the United States under-20 team at the 2016 FIFA U-20 Women's World Cup.

In March 2017, Jean was called into camp for the United States under-23 team for the first time. In June 2017, she was named to the under-23 roster for the 2017 Nordic Cup, where the United States finished in second place. Jean was called into under-23 camp again in July 2017 and January 2018, and in March was named to the roster that would compete in the 2018 Portland Thorns FC Spring Invitational pre-season tournament.

== Personal life ==
Jean is Dominican American.

Jean's birth father, Domingo Jean, had been a pitcher for the New York Yankees in 1993. He left the family when Jean was a child, and Jean's mother, Rebecca, raised her as a single parent. Jean's mother remarried, and Jean's stepfather Kevin Bacher was an assistant coach for the UConn Huskies men's soccer team, which inspired Jean to play soccer. Jean would later reconnect with her father and half-brother as an adult after returning to the United States from the Netherlands in 2022.

== Honors ==
Penn State Nittany Lions

- Women's College Cup champion: 2015

PSV Eindhoven

- KNVB Women's Cup: 2020–21

NJ/NY Gotham FC

- NWSL Championship: 2023
