= Racing Louisville FC =

National Women's Soccer League team in Louisville, Kentucky

- Full name: Racing Louisville Football Club
- Founded: October 22, 2019; 7 years ago
- Stadium: Lynn Family Stadium; Louisville, Kentucky
- Capacity: 15,304
- Owner(s): Soccer Holdings, LLC
- Chairman: John Neace
- Head coach: Bev Yanez
- League: National Women's Soccer League
- 2026: Regular season: 15th of 16; Playoffs: DNQ
- Website: racingloufc.com
| Home colors | Away colors | Third colors |

Racing Louisville Football Club is an American professional soccer team based in Louisville, Kentucky, that competes in the National Women's Soccer League (NWSL). It plays home matches at Lynn Family Stadium, which seats 15,304 spectators. The team is owned by Soccer Holdings LLC, which it shares with Louisville City FC of the USL Championship men's league. Louisville's expansion team was announced on October 22, 2019, and began play in the 2021 season. Their second team plays in the USL W League.

== History ==
Louisville was mentioned as a potential candidate for an expansion team in National Women's Soccer League as early as 2018, shortly after construction began on their soccer-specific venue, Lynn Family Stadium. Soccer Holdings, LLC, ownership group of USL Championship club Louisville City FC began preliminary discussions with the league the following year, with plans to enter in the 2020 season. Louisville's NWSL expansion team was officially announced on October 22, 2019, sharing its ownership group with Louisville City FC. It would begin play in 2021 at Lynn Family Stadium. The team became the first professional team to play in the city of Louisville since the Kentucky Colonels in 1975.

In November 2019, NWSL filed a trademark application for "Proof Louisville FC", which was confirmed by Louisville City FC as their preliminary name for the team. The name references the local bourbon whiskey industry by using the term "proof", a measure of alcohol content. The ownership group later announced in April 2020 that they would explore other names with community input after a mixed reception from fans. The club's new name, Racing Louisville FC, was officially unveiled on July 8, 2020. PNC Bank was announced as the club's first kit sponsor on July 1, 2020, with the company's logo appearing on the back of the team's jerseys. On December 17, 2020, Louisville City announced that GE Appliances, which had already been that club's primary shirt sponsor (i.e., on the front of the kit), would expand this sponsorship to include all clubs under the Louisville City umbrella, including Racing.

Former Sky Blue FC head coach Christy Holly was named as Racing Louisville FC's first head coach on August 12, 2020. The club made their NWSL debut in the 2021 NWSL Challenge Cup, where they finished at the bottom of the East Division with two losses and two draws. Racing Louisville FC made their home debut on May 15, 2021, playing to a scoreless draw against Kansas City NWSL.

Holly was fired for cause on August 31, 2021, and the club named Mario Sanchez, head of the club's youth academy and former collegiate coach, as the interim head coach. After the season, veteran Swedish coach Kim Björkegren was named as the permanent replacement. In 2022, a report from U.S. Soccer revealed that Holly had allegedly sexually abused players as coach of Racing.

Racing named former NWSL MVP finalist and Best XI selection Bev Yanez as its new coach in November 2023. In 2025, Bev Yanez was named NWSL Coach of the Year. Racing Louisville has been the subject of a speculated relocation due to the small market size, low attendance, and the team's low valuation, estimated at $127 million to $140 million. A sale of partial ownership was proposed in early 2026 amid interest from FC Cincinnati, who had failed to win an expansion team of their own.

== Club identity ==
Racing Louisville FC is named in reference to the city's horse racing venues, including the Kentucky Derby at Churchill Downs, using the "Racing" moniker used by foreign clubs. The club's circular crest uses a lavender background and a four-pointed fleur-de-lis at its center in violet. It was designed by Matthew Wolff, who had previously worked with Major League Soccer teams New York City FC and Los Angeles FC.

=== Sponsorship ===
On December 17, 2020, GE Appliances became the exclusive front-of-jersey sponsor for Soccer Holdings, LLC, the parent organization of Racing Louisville.

| Seasons | Jersey manufacturer | Front-of-Jersey |
|---|---|---|
| 2021–present | Nike, Inc. | GE Appliances |

== Stadium and facilities ==
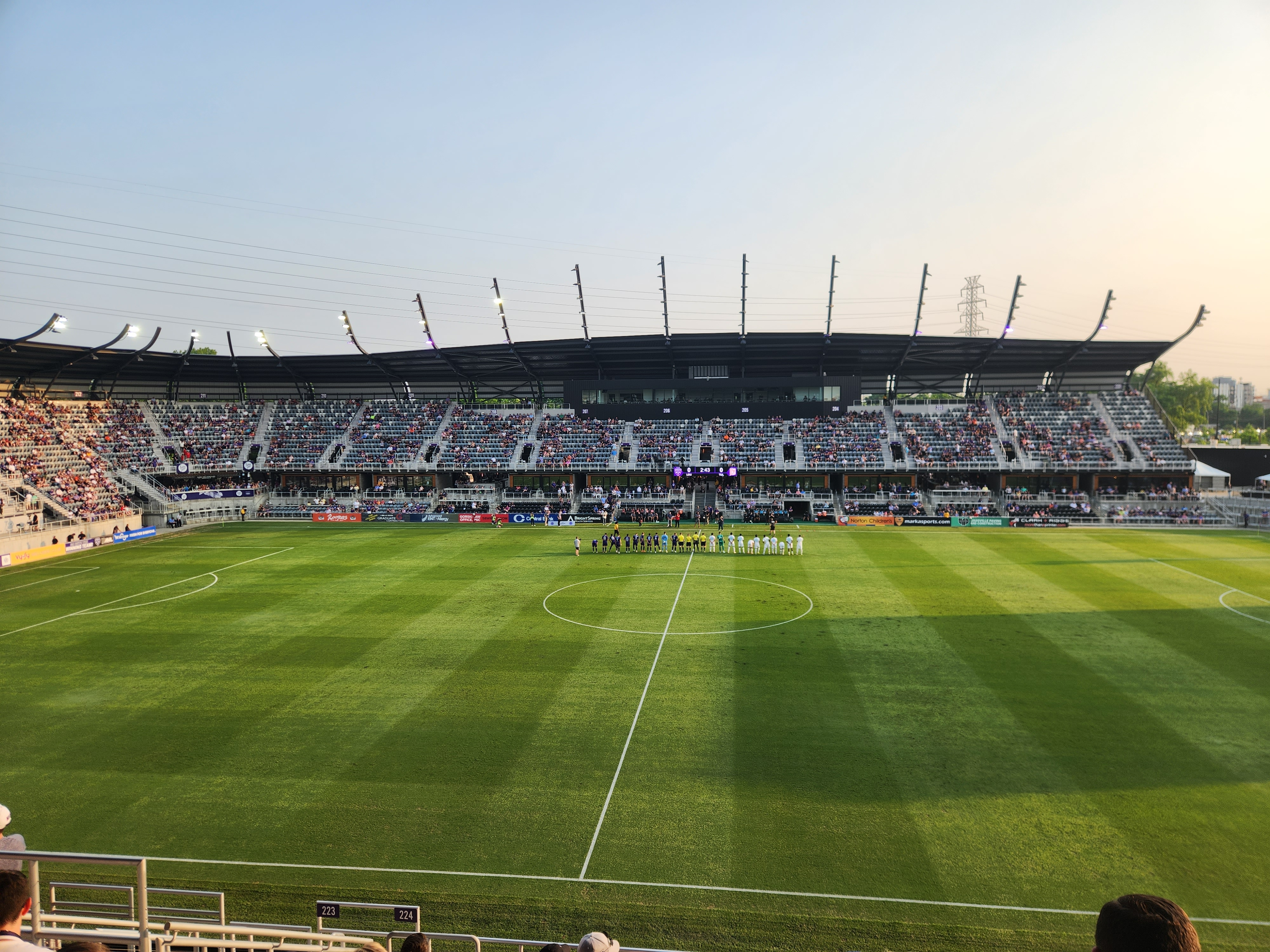
Lynn Family Stadium, the team's home venue

The club shares Lynn Family Stadium and its training facilities with Louisville City FC. The soccer-specific stadium, opened in 2020, has a seated capacity of 11,600, with standing-room capacity up to 15,304. The 20-acre (8.1 ha) training facilities at Louisville Champions Park includes several practice fields and an indoor gymnasium and office complex.

== Players and staff ==
=== Current squad ===
As of November 8, 2026.

| No. | Pos. | Nation | Player |
|---|---|---|---|
| 1 | GK | USA | Maddie Prohaska |
| 2 | DF | USA | Lauren Milliet |
| 3 | DF | USA | Arin Wright |
| 4 | MF | USA | Makenna Morris |
| 5 | DF | USA | Ellie Jean |
| 7 | MF | USA | Savannah DeMelo |
| 8 | DF | USA | Courtney Petersen |
| 9 | FW | USA | Kayla Fischer |
| 10 | MF | USA | Macey Hodge |
| 11 | FW | USA | Taylor White |
| 12 | DF | USA | Quincy McMahon |
| 13 | FW | USA | Emma Sears |
| 14 | MF | USA | Marisa DiGrande |
| 15 | DF | USA | Mirann Gacioch |
| 16 | FW | USA | Maja Lardner |
| 17 | MF | USA | Maddie Pokorny |
| 19 | DF | USA | Avery Ciorbu |
| 20 | MF | USA | Katie O'Kane |
| 21 | FW | USA | Rachel Hill |
| 22 | MF | USA | Natalie Mitchell |
| 23 | DF | USA | Macy Philippus |
| 24 | GK | USA | Jordyn Bloomer |
| 26 | MF | USA | Taylor Flint |
| 28 | MF | USA | Jordan Fusco (on loan from the San Diego Wave) |
| 30 | GK | USA | Erynn Floyd |
| 42 | FW | USA | Sarah Weber |
| 88 | FW | USA | Audrey McKeen |

==== Out on loan ====
| No. | Pos. | Nation | Player |
|---|---|---|---|
| 33 | GK | PUR | Cristina Roque (at Tampa Bay Sun FC through December 31, 2026) |

=== Staff ===
As of November 17, 2026

Technical
| Head coach | Beverly Yanez |
| Assistant coach | Mitch Sowerby |
| Assistant coach | Kiley Polk |
| Goalkeeper coach | Sergio Gonzalez |
Support
| Head athletic trainer | Summer Jones |
| Athletic trainer | Michaela Clay |
| Head equipment manager | Sarah Kanuch |

=== Head coaches ===
As of November 17, 2026

| Name | Tenure | Refs |
|---|---|---|
| Christy Holly | August 12, 2020 – August 31, 2021 | |
| Mario Sanchez (interim) | August 31, 2021 – December 9, 2021 | |
| Kim Björkegren | December 9, 2021 – October 27, 2023 | |
| Bev Yanez | November 30, 2023 – | |

== Record ==
=== Year-by-year ===
==== First team ====
As of November 3, 2025

| Season | League | Regular season | | | | | | | | | Playoffs | Challenge Cup | Average attendance | Total attendance |
| Season | League | P | W | D | L | GF | GA | GD | Pts | Pos | Playoffs | Challenge Cup | Average attendance | Total attendance |
|---|---|---|---|---|---|---|---|---|---|---|---|---|---|---|
| 2021 | NWSL | 24 | 5 | 7 | 12 | 21 | 40 | -19 | 22 | 9th | Did not qualify | Group stage | 6,565 | 79,042 |
| 2022 | NWSL | 22 | 5 | 8 | 9 | 23 | 35 | -12 | 23 | 9th | Did not qualify | Group stage | 6,048 | 66,529 |
| 2023 | NWSL | 22 | 6 | 9 | 7 | 25 | 24 | 1 | 27 | 9th | Did not qualify | Runners-up | 5,999 | 65,989 |
| 2024 | NWSL | 26 | 7 | 7 | 12 | 33 | 39 | -6 | 28 | 9th | Did not qualify | DNQ | 6,223 | 86,916 |
| 2025 | NWSL | 26 | 10 | 7 | 9 | 35 | 38 | -3 | 37 | 7th | Quarterfinals | DNQ | 5,521 | 71,775 |
| 2026 | NWSL | 30 | 7 | 3 | 20 | 38 | 62 | -24 | 24 | 15th | Did not qualify | DNQ | 4,528 | 81,803 |

==== Second team ====
| Season | League | Regular season | | | | | | | | | Playoffs |
| Season | League | P | W | D | L | GF | GA | GD | Pts | Pos | Playoffs |
|---|---|---|---|---|---|---|---|---|---|---|---|
| 2022 | USL W League | 12 | 6 | 3 | 3 | 26 | 15 | +11 | 21 | 3rd, Great Lakes | Did not qualify |
| 2023 | USL W League | 10 | 8 | 1 | 1 | 42 | 4 | +38 | 25 | 2nd, Great Lakes | Did not qualify |
| 2024 | USL W League | 10 | 4 | 2 | 4 | 32 | 17 | +15 | 14 | 4th, Great Lakes | Did not qualify |
| 2025 | USL W League | 10 | 6 | 2 | 2 | 31 | 8 | +23 | 20 | 2nd, Great Lakes | Did not qualify |
| 2026 | USL W League | 9 | 6 | 2 | 1 | 18 | 10 | +8 | 20 | 1st, Great Lakes | Conference Semifinals |

=== Team records ===
==== First team ====
As of November 8, 2026. Current players in bold. Statistics are updated once a year after the conclusion of the NWSL season.

Most appearances
| Player | | | | | Appearances | | | | |
| # | Name | Nat. | Pos. | Racing career | NWSL | Playoffs | Cup | Other | Total |
|---|---|---|---|---|---|---|---|---|---|
| 1 | **Lauren Milliet** | (United States) | DF | 2021– | 143 | 1 | 16 | 3 | 163 |
| 2 | **Kayla Fischer** | (United States) | FW | 2023– | 85 | 1 | 6 | 3 | 95 |
| 3 | Katie Lund | (United States) | GK | 2021–2025 | 80 | 0 | 11 | 1 | 92 |
| 4 | **Savannah DeMelo** | (United States) | MF | 2022– | 81 | 0 | 8 | 2 | 91 |
| 5 | **Emma Sears** | (United States) | FW | 2024– | 81 | 1 | 0 | 3 | 85 |
| 6 | **Arin Wright** | (United States) | DF | 2024– | 69 | 1 | 0 | 3 | 73 |
| 7 | **Taylor Flint** | (United States) | MF | 2024– | 67 | 1 | 0 | 3 | 71 |
| 8 | Jaelin Howell | (United States) | MF | 2022–2024 | 50 | 0 | 10 | 3 | 63 |
| 9 | Ary Borges | (Brazil) | MF | 2023–2025 | 53 | 1 | 3 | 3 | 60 |
| 10 | **Ellie Jean** | (United States) | DF | 2025– | 54 | 1 | 0 | 3 | 58 |

Top goalscorers
| Player | | | | | Appearances | | | | |
| # | Name | Nat. | Pos. | Racing career | NWSL | Playoffs | Cup | Other | Total |
|---|---|---|---|---|---|---|---|---|---|
| 1 | **Emma Sears** | (United States) | FW | 2024– | 22 | 0 | 0 | 1 | 23 |
| 2 | **Savannah DeMelo** | (United States) | MF | 2022– | 17 | 0 | 3 | 0 | 20 |
| 3 | **Kayla Fischer** | (United States) | FW | 2023– | 12 | 1 | 1 | 1 | 15 |
| 4 | **Taylor Flint** | (United States) | MF | 2024– | 12 | 0 | 0 | 0 | 12 |
| 5 | Nadia Nadim | (Denmark) | FW | 2021–2023 | 10 | 0 | 0 | 0 | 10 |
| 6 | Cece Kizer | (United States) | FW | 2021–2022 | 5 | 0 | 3 | 0 | 8 |
| 7 | Uchenna Kanu | (Nigeria) | FW | 2023–2025 | 6 | 0 | 1 | 0 | 7 |
| 7 | Kirsten Wright | (United States) | FW | 2022–2025 | 6 | 0 | 1 | 0 | 7 |
| 9 | Ebony Salmon | (England) | FW | 2021–2022 | 6 | 0 | 0 | 0 | 6 |
| 9 | **Sarah Weber** | (United States) | FW | 2025– | 6 | 0 | 0 | 0 | 6 |
