= Taylor White (American soccer) =

American soccer player (born 2004)

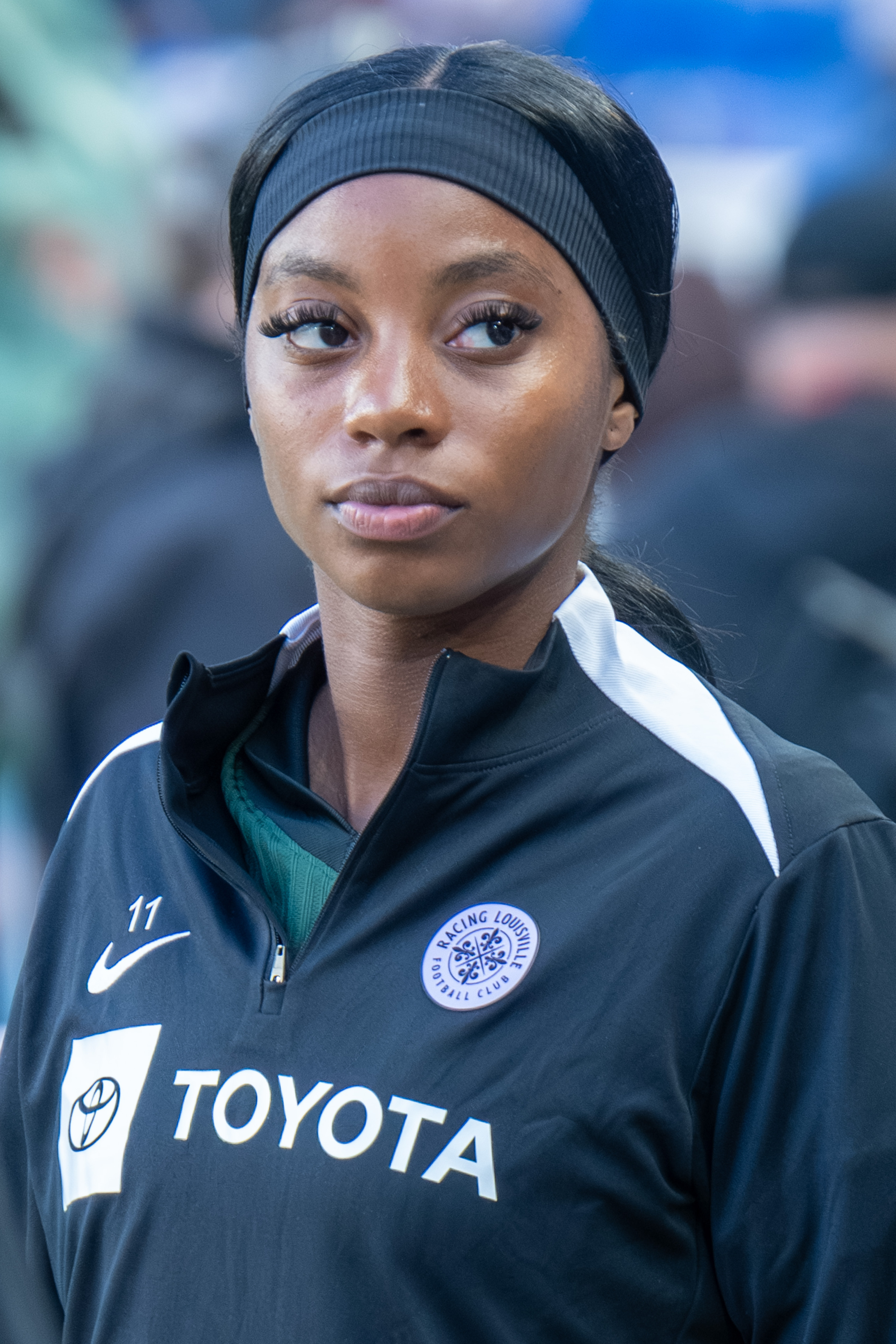
- White with Racing Louisville in 2026

Personal information
- Full name: Taylor Michele White
- Date of birth: April 23, 2004 (age 22)
- Height: 5 ft 6 in (1.68 m)
- Position: Forward

Team information
- Current team: Racing Louisville
- Number: 11

College career
Years	Team	Apps	(Gls)
2022–2025	West Virginia Mountaineers	80	(26)

Senior career*
Years	Team	Apps	(Gls)
2024–2025	Kings Hammer FC	15	(9)
2026–	Racing Louisville	10	(1)
- * Club domestic league appearances and goals as of 06:00, November 2, 2026 (UTC)

Taylor Michele White (born April 23, 2004) is an American professional soccer player who plays as a forward for Racing Louisville FC of the National Women's Soccer League (NWSL). She played college soccer for the West Virginia Mountaineers, earning third-team All-American honors in 2025.

== Early life ==
White grew up in Cincinnati, Ohio. She attended Winton Woods High School, where she also played basketball, and she played club soccer for Cincinnati United in the Girls Academy.

== College career ==
White played in 20 games and had 2 assists for the West Virginia Mountaineers as a freshman in 2022. She helped the team win the Big 12 tournament and had an assist in the NCAA tournament as they made the second round. She then became a starter as a sophomore in 2023, leading the team with 9 goals and adding 2 assists in 19 games. After starting her junior year with a minor injury, she again led the team with 7 goals and had 3 assists in 20 games in 2024, earning second-team All-Big 12 honors. She had a breakout senior year in 2025, leading the Mountaineers with 10 goals and 10 assists in 21 games. She helped lead the team go unbeaten in the Big 12, placing second in the conference, and reach the NCAA tournament second round, while achieving their highest win total since 2018. She was named first-team All-Big 12 and third-team All-American by United Soccer Coaches.

== Club career ==
Racing Louisville FC announced on January 7, 2026, that they had signed White to her first professional contract on a two-year deal. She made her professional debut as a second-half substitute for Ella Hase in a season-opening 2–1 loss to the North Carolina Courage on March 14.

== Personal life ==
White is the daughter of Anthony and Nancy White and has two siblings. Her father played college football for Morehead State, and her mother played college basketball for Chattanooga. Her brother, Michael, played college soccer for Shepherd, and her sister, Morgan, plays professionally in France.

== Honors and awards ==
West Virginia Mountaineers

- Big 12 Conference tournament: 2022

Individual

- Third-team All-American: 2025
- First-team All-Big 12: 2025
- Second-team All-Big 12: 2024
