= Maddie Prohaska =

American soccer player (born 2002)

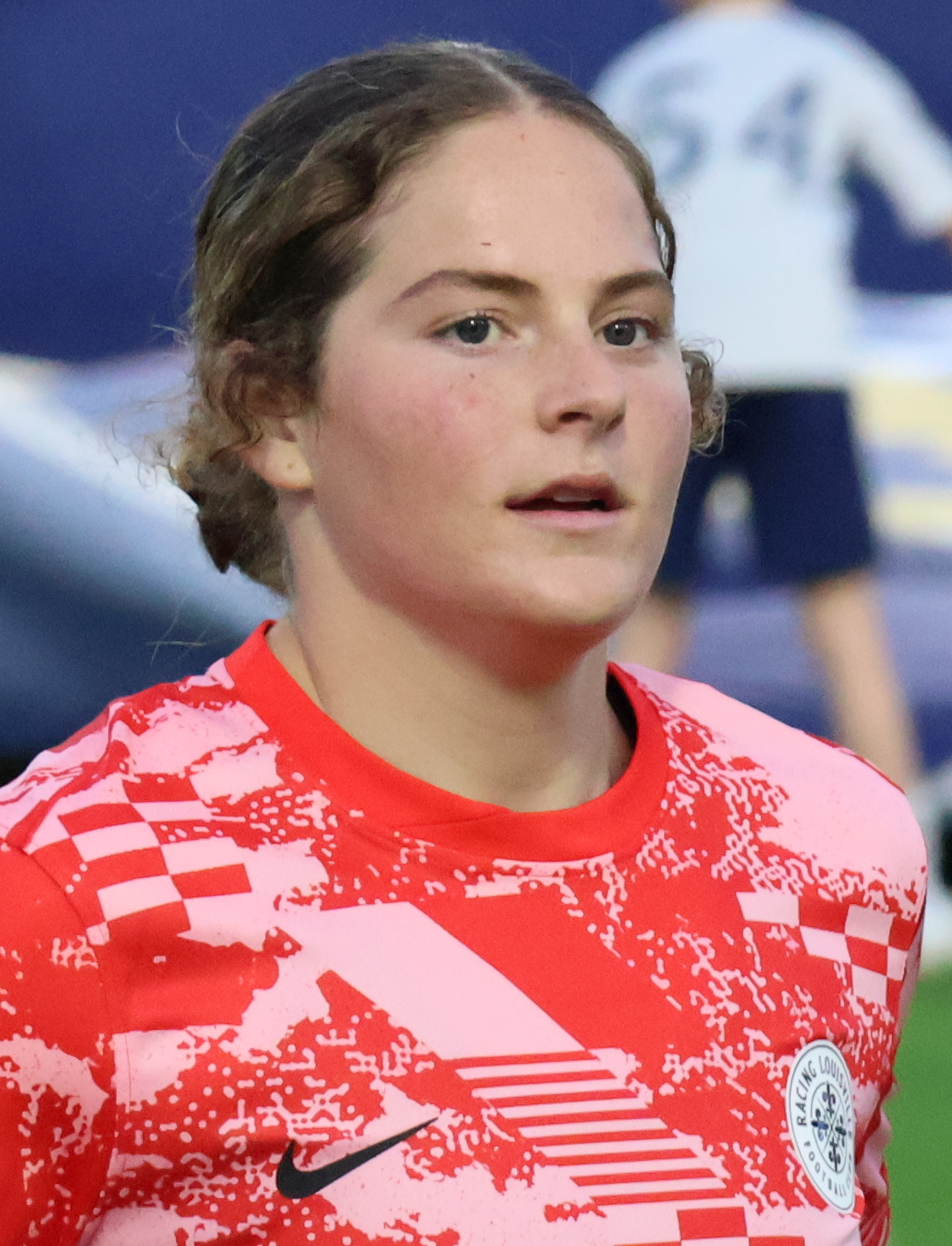
- Prohaska with Racing Louisville in 2026

Personal information
- Full name: Madison Prohaska
- Date of birth: December 2, 2002 (age 23)
- Height: 5 ft 11 in (1.80 m)
- Position: Goalkeeper

Team information
- Current team: Racing Louisville
- Number: 1

Youth career
- FC Cincinnati

College career
Years	Team	Apps	(Gls)
2020–2024	Auburn Tigers	96	(0)

Senior career*
Years	Team	Apps	(Gls)
2025	Seattle Reign	0	(0)
2026–	Racing Louisville	4	(0)
- * Club domestic league appearances and goals as of 05:54, November 2, 2026 (UTC)

Madison Prohaska (born December 2, 2002) is an American professional soccer player who plays as a goalkeeper for Racing Louisville FC of the National Women's Soccer League (NWSL). She played college soccer for the Auburn Tigers, setting the program record for career shutouts. She began her professional career with the Seattle Reign in 2025.

== Early life ==
Prohaska grew up in West Chester, Ohio, and attended Lakota West High School. She committed to play college soccer for the Auburn Tigers as a freshman. She played club soccer for FC Cincinnati in the Development Academy. She played high school basketball and one season of high school soccer in 2019, making 8 shutouts in 19 games as Lakota West won the OHSAA state championship.

== College career ==
Prohaska arrived at Auburn as an early enrollee and became the starting goalkeeper as a freshman in 2020. She led the Southeastern Conference with an 0.843 save percentage and contributed to 8 clean sheets in 17 starts, earning SEC all-freshman honors. Because the season was disrupted by the COVID-19 pandemic, she received an extra year of eligibility and would play four more years with the team. She started all 20 games in her sophomore season and kept 7 clean sheets. In the SEC tournament, South Carolina could only score against Prohaska from the penalty spot as Auburn advanced to the semifinals. In her junior season, she started all 18 games and kept 7 clean sheets.

Prohaska became one of Auburn's captains in her senior season in 2023. She started all 20 games and recorded 7 shutouts (including two combined shutouts) and 1 assist, which came during the SEC tournament. In her graduate season, Prohaska started all 21 games and kept a career-high 12 clean sheets. She helped Auburn reach the second round of the NCAA tournament before falling to her former youth teammates Kailyn Dudukovich and Sydney Jones of Ohio State. After five seasons, she left Auburn as the program career leader in clean sheets with 36, third-most in SEC history.

== Club career ==
=== Seattle Reign ===
Prohaska joined the Seattle Reign as a non-roster trialist in the 2025 preseason. On March 6, 2025, the Reign announced that she had signed her first professional contract with the club on a one-year deal. She began her rookie season as the third-stringer behind starter Claudia Dickey and veteran backup Cassie Miller, before moving to the gameday bench after Miller sustained a leg injury in May. In July, she made her professional debut in a 2–1 friendly win against the Urawa Red Diamonds. On August 7, the Reign announced that she had signed a one-year extension with the club. She made no league appearances as Dickey was the only goalkeeper the play every minute of the NWSL season.

=== Racing Louisville ===
On January 14, 2026, Prohaska was traded to Racing Louisville FC in exchange for US$25,000 in intraleague transfer funds and US$25,000 in allocation money with potential add-ons. She made her NWSL debut against the North Carolina Courage on May 23, replacing injured starter Jordyn Bloomer in the 22nd minute and allowing one goal as Racing were beaten 2–1. Six days later, she made her first NWSL start in a 1–0 loss to expansion team Denver Summit. On July 1, she signed a one-year contract extension with Louisville.

== International career ==
Prohaska was called up to train with the United States under-14 team in March 2016. In June 2025, she was called into training with the United States under-23 team at a camp held concurrently with the senior national team.

== Personal life ==
Prohaska is one of three children born to Tom and Melissa Prohaska. Her father was a college football linebacker at Ashland University. Her older sister, Abby, played college basketball at Notre Dame and San Diego State.

== Honors and awards ==
Individual

- SEC all-freshman team: 2020
