= 2026 Portland Thorns FC season =

Portland Thorns FC
2026 season
- Owner: RAJ Sports
- General manager: Jeff Agoos
- Head coach: Robert Vilahamn
- Stadium: Providence Park; (capacity: 25,218)
- League: 6th
- Playoffs: Quarterfinals
- Top goalscorer: Sophia Wilson (15)
- Highest home attendance: 22,017 (vs Denver Summit FC, Aug 22)
- Lowest home attendance: 15,683 (vs Bay FC, May 20)
- Average home league attendance: 19,067
- Biggest win: 4–0 (vs Racing Louisville (H), NWSL, July 5)
- Biggest defeat: 1–5 (vs Utah Royals (A), NWSL, Aug 2)
| Home colors | Away colors |
- All statistics correct as of November 8, 2026.

The 2026 Portland Thorns FC season was the team's fourteenth season as a professional women's soccer team. Thorns FC played in the National Women's Soccer League (NWSL), the top tier of women's soccer in the United States.

== Team ==
=== Squad ===
As of August 15, 2026.

| No. | Nat. | Name | Date of birth (age) | Since | Previous team | Notes (Note: denotes a season-ending injury.) |
Goalkeepers
| 1 | (United States) | Bella Bixby | November 20, 1995 (age 30) | 2018 | (United States) Oregon State | |
| 18 | (Australia) | Mackenzie Arnold | February 25, 1994 (age 32) | 2024 | (England) West Ham United | INTL |
| 28 | (United States) | Mackenzie Wood | July 4, 2000 (age 26) | 2026 | (United States) Chicago Stars | LOAN |
| 35 | (United States) | Morgan Messner | February 17, 2000 (age 26) | 2025 | (United States) San Diego Wave | |
Defenders
| 2 | (Mexico) | Reyna Reyes | February 16, 2001 (age 25) | 2024 | (United States) Alabama Crimson Tide | |
| 4 | (United States) | Carolyn Calzada | March 6, 2003 (age 23) | 2026 | (United States) Notre Dame | |
| 5 | (Denmark) | Isabella Obaze | October 30, 2002 (age 24) | 2024 | (Sweden) FC Rosengård | INTL |
| 16 | (United States) | Sam Hiatt (c) | January 6, 1998 (age 28) | 2025 | (United States) Gotham FC | |
| 23 | (Germany) | Marie Müller | July 25, 2000 (age 26) | 2024 | (Germany) SC Freiburg | INTL |
| 24 | (United States) | Jayden Perry | February 20, 2001 (age 25) | 2025 | (United States) UCLA Bruins | |
| 25 | (United States) | M.A. Vignola | February 11, 1998 (age 28) | 2025 | (United States) Angel City | |
| 29 | (United States) | Mallie McKenzie | November 13, 2000 (age 25) | 2024 | (United States) Georgia Bulldogs | |
Midfielders
| 6 | (Sweden) | Cassandra Bogere | June 25, 2005 (age 21) | 2026 | (Norway) SK Brann | INTL |
| 13 | (United States) | Olivia Moultrie | September 17, 2005 (age 21) | 2021 | Portland Thorns Academy | |
| 15 | (United States) | Shae Harvey | March 5, 2005 (age 21) | 2025 | (United States) Stanford | |
| 20 | (Netherlands) | Nina Nijstad | March 5, 2003 (age 23) | 2026 | (Netherlands) PSV Eindhoven | INTL |
| 21 | (Canada) | Jessie Fleming | March 11, 1998 (age 28) | 2024 | (England) Chelsea | INTL |
| 41 | (United States) | Renee Lyles | October 30, 2002 (age 24) | 2026 | (United States) Clemson Tigers | |
Forwards
| 7 | (United States) | Caiya Hanks | September 26, 2004 (age 22) | 2025 | (United States) Wake Forest | |
| 9 | (United States) | Sophia Wilson | August 10, 2000 (age 26) | 2020 | (United States) Stanford | |
| 10 | (Venezuela) | Deyna Castellanos | April 18, 1999 (age 27) | 2025 | (United States) Bay FC | |
| 11 | (United States) | Maddie Padelski | September 29, 2007 (age 19) | 2026 | (United States) Alabama Crimson Tide | |
| 19 | (United States) | Pietra Tordin | March 30, 2004 (age 22) | 2025 | (United States) Princeton Tigers | |
| 22 | (United States) | Morgan Weaver | October 18, 1997 (age 29) | 2020 | (United States) Washington State | |
| 27 | (France) | Julie Dufour | May 29, 2001 (age 25) | 2025 | (United States) Angel City | INTL |
| 66 | (United States) | Reilyn Turner | October 18, 2002 (age 24) | 2024 | (United States) Racing Louisville | |
| 88 | (Colombia) | Valerin Loboa | July 3, 2007 (age 19) | 2025 | (Colombia) Deportivo Cali | INTL |

=== Technical staff ===
On March 4, the club announced the appointment of Robert Vilahamn as permanent head coach. Vilahamn was previously the head coach of Tottenham Hotspur in the Women's Super League in England, and Swedish side BK Häcken in the Damallsvenskan.

On April 14, the Thorns announced the promotion of Sarah Lowdon to first assistant coach, and the hiring of former Gotham FC assistant coach Jen Lalor as assistant coach of individual development. On May 2, the Thorns announced the hiring of former BK Häcken goalkeeping coach Mattias Gustafsson.

As of May 2, 2026.

Executive
| President and General Manager | (United States) Jeff Agoos |
| Technical Director | (England) Mike Norris |
Coaching
| Head Coach | (Sweden) Robert Vilahamn |
| First Assistant Coach | (England) Sarah Lowdon |
| Assistant Coach | (Lithuania) Vytautas Andriuškevičius |
| Assistant Coach | (United States) Kelly Madsen |
| Assistant Coach | (United States) Jennifer Lalor |
| Goalkeeping Coach | (Sweden) Mattias Gustafsson |

== Pre-season ==
=== Coachella Valley Invitational ===
| February 15 | Angel City | 2–1 | Portland Thorns | Indio, California |
| 1:00 pm PT | Niehues 2', 56'; Sugita (yellow card) 85' | Report | Spaanstra (yellow card) 65'; Lyles 89' | Stadium: Empire Polo Club |

| February 21 | Houston Dash | 1–1 | Portland Thorns | Indio, California |
| 10:30 am PT | Obaze 67' (o.g.) | Report | Castellanos 67'; Immethun (yellow card) 85' | Stadium: Empire Polo Club |

=== Friendly ===
| March 6 | Portland Thorns | 5–1 | (Mexico) Monterrey | Portland, Oregon |
| 7:00 pm PT | Spaanstra 11' (pen.); Lyles 22', 31', 45+2'; McKenzie 42' | Report | Evangelista 36' | Stadium: Providence Park |

== Mid-season ==
=== Friendly ===
| June 28 | Portland Thorns | 3–4 | San Diego Wave | Portland, Oregon |
| 4:00 pm PDT | Wilson 18'; Moultrie 45+2'; Müller 73' | Report | Byars 14'; Ludmila 54', 74'; Godfrey 88' | Stadium: Providence Park; Attendance: 17,072 |

== Competitions ==
Win Draw Loss

=== Regular season ===
| Pos | Team | Pld | W | D | L | GF | GA | GD | Pts | Qualification |
|---|---|---|---|---|---|---|---|---|---|---|
| 4 | Kansas City Current | 30 | 16 | 5 | 9 | 54 | 39 | +15 | 53 | Playoffs |
| 5 | Angel City FC | 30 | 15 | 7 | 8 | 54 | 32 | +22 | 52 | Playoffs |
| 6 | Portland Thorns FC | 30 | 14 | 8 | 8 | 50 | 41 | +9 | 50 | Playoffs |
| 7 | Utah Royals | 30 | 14 | 5 | 11 | 44 | 39 | +5 | 47 | Playoffs |
| 8 | Seattle Reign FC | 30 | 14 | 5 | 11 | 37 | 33 | +4 | 47 | Playoffs |

Source: NWSL
Rules for classification: 1) points; 2) total goal difference; 3) total wins; 4) total goals scored; 5) head-to-head points; 6) head-to-head goal goals scored; 7) fewest disciplinary points; 8) coin toss (if 2 clubs tied) or drawing of lots (if ≥3 clubs tied).

==== Results summary ====
| Overall | | | | | | | | Home | | | | | | Away | | | | | |
| Pld | W | D | L | GF | GA | GD | Pts | W | D | L | GF | GA | GD | W | D | L | GF | GA | GD |
|---|---|---|---|---|---|---|---|---|---|---|---|---|---|---|---|---|---|---|---|
| 30 | 14 | 8 | 8 | 50 | 41 | +9 | 50 | 8 | 5 | 2 | 25 | 13 | +12 | 6 | 3 | 6 | 25 | 28 | −3 |

Last updated: November 1, 2026.
Source: NWSL

==== Results by matchday ====
| Matchday | 1 | 2 | 3 | 4 | 5 | 6 | 7 | 8 | 9 | 10 | 11 | 12 | 13 | 14 | 15 | 16 | 17 | 18 | 19 | 20 | 21 | 22 | 23 | 24 | 25 | 26 | 27 | 28 | 29 | 30 |
|---|---|---|---|---|---|---|---|---|---|---|---|---|---|---|---|---|---|---|---|---|---|---|---|---|---|---|---|---|---|---|
| Ground | A | H | A | H | A | A | H | A | A | H | H | A | H | H | A | A | H | A | A | H | H | A | H | H | A | H | H | A | H | A |
| Result | W | W | L | W | D | W | W | W | L | D | W | L | D | W | L | L | D | L | W | W | W | D | L | D | W | D | L | D | W | W |
| Position | 6 | 3 | 5 | 4 | 2 | 2 | 1 | 1 | 1 | 3 | 1 | 2 | 3 | 2 | 3 | 4 | 5 | 6 | 5 | 4 | 3 | 5 | 6 | 6 | 5 | 5 | 7 | 7 | 7 | 6 |

Updated to match(es) played on November 1, 2026. Source: NWSL
A = Away; H = Home; W = Win; D = Draw; L = Loss; P = Postponed

==== Matches ====
| March 13 1 | Washington Spirit | 0–1 | Portland Thorns | Washington D.C. |
| 8:00 pm EDT | | Report | Moultrie 52' | Stadium: Audi Field; Attendance: 19,215; Referee: Brad Jensen |

| March 20 2 | Portland Thorns | 2–0 | Seattle Reign | Portland, Oregon |
| 7:00 pm PDT | Bogere (yellow card) 8' (red card) 9'; Tordin 28'; Turner 37'; Reyes (red card) 57'; Müller (yellow card) 58' | Report | Ward (yellow card) 90+1' | Stadium: Providence Park; Attendance: 21,321; Referee: Elvis Osmanovic |

| March 25 3 | San Diego Wave | 3–1 | Portland Thorns | San Diego, California |
| 7:00 pm PDT | Dudinha 2'; Godfrey 27'; Morroni (yellow card) 54'; Barcenas 82' | Report | Tordin 8'; Moultrie (yellow card) 61' | Stadium: Snapdragon Stadium; Attendance: 8,428; Referee: Jaclyn Metz |

| March 28 4 | Portland Thorns | 2–0 | Kansas City Current | Portland, Oregon |
| 1:00 pm PDT | Vignola (yellow card) 21'; Moultrie 53' (pen.); Turner 63' | Report | Bravo-Young (yellow card) 32'; Bethune (yellow card) 34'; Sharples (yellow card) 78' | Stadium: Providence Park; Attendance: 16,734; Referee: Abdou Ndiaye |

| April 4 5 | North Carolina Courage | 2–2 | Portland Thorns | Cary, North Carolina |
| 6:30 pm EDT | Matsukubo 28'; Sanchez 37'; Ijeh (yellow card) 80' | Report | Turner 12'; Moultrie 33'; Castellanos (yellow card) 84' | Stadium: WakeMed Soccer Park; Attendance: 7,018; Referee: Alyssa Pennington |

| April 26 6 | Angel City | 1–2 | Portland Thorns | Los Angeles, California |
| 3:00 pm PDT | Chilufya 90+8' | Report | Tordin (yellow card) 39', (goal) 76'; Calzada (yellow card) 65'; Wilson 90+5' | Stadium: BMO Stadium; Attendance: 16,636; Referee: Katja Koroleva |

| April 29 7 | Portland Thorns | 2–0 | San Diego Wave | Portland, Oregon |
| 7:00 pm PDT | Müller 10'; Wilson (yellow card) 40', (goal) 64'; Perry (yellow card) 85' | Report | Byars (yellow card) 72' | Stadium: Providence Park; Attendance: 19,806; Referee: Elton Garcia |

| May 3 8 | Chicago Stars | 0–2 | Portland Thorns | Evanston, Illinois |
| 12:00 pm CDT | | Report | Moultrie 17'; Turner 89' | Stadium: Martin Stadium; Attendance: 4,344; Referee: Brad Jensen |

| May 8 9 | Racing Louisville | 3–1 | Portland Thorns | Louisville, Kentucky |
| 6:30 pm EDT | O'Kane 14', 77'; Fischer (yellow card) 41'; Flint (yellow card) 73'; Sears 90+6' | Report | Wilson 6'; Hiatt (yellow card) 76' | Stadium: Lynn Family Stadium; Attendance: 5,356; Referee: Muhammad Hassan |

| May 17 10 | Portland Thorns | 0–0 | Angel City | Portland, Oregon |
| 3:00 pm PDT | | Report | Martin (yellow card) 11'; Sams (yellow card) 82' | Stadium: Providence Park; Attendance: 20,652; Referee: Alex Billeter |

| May 20 11 | Portland Thorns | 2–0 | Bay FC | Portland, Oregon |
| 7:00 pm PDT | Vignola 30'; McKenzie 77', (yellow card) 90' | Report | Cometti (yellow card) 65' | Stadium: Providence Park; Attendance: 15,683; Referee: John Griggs |

| May 24 12 | Kansas City Current | 3–1 | Portland Thorns | Kansas City, Missouri |
| 12:00 pm CDT | LaBonta 41'; Chawinga 63'; Hopkins 90+3' | Report | Wilson 14' | Stadium: CPKC Stadium; Attendance: 11,500; Referee: Natalie Simon |

| May 30 13 | Portland Thorns | 2–2 | Utah Royals | Portland, Oregon |
| 1:00 pm PDT | Moultrie 21'; Bogere (yellow card) 61'; Wilson 90+1' (pen.) | Report | Palacios 44'; Tanaka (yellow card) 48'; Lacasse 50', (yellow card) 90+2'; Tejada (yellow card) 52'; Pierre-Louis (yellow card) 68' | Stadium: Providence Park; Attendance: 20,053; Referee: Sergii Demianchuk |

| July 5 14 | Portland Thorns | 4–0 | Racing Louisville | Portland, Oregon |
| 4:00 pm PDT | Perry (yellow card) 8', (goal) 13'; Tordin 36'; Turner 41'; Immethun (yellow card) 75'; Wilson 82' | Report | Jean (yellow card) 17'; Hodge (yellow card) 61' | Stadium: Providence Park; Attendance: 16,638; Referee: Shawn Tehini |

| July 12 15 | Seattle Reign | 2–0 | Portland Thorns | Seattle, Washington |
| 1:00 pm PDT | Brown 8'; Mercado 43'; Meza (yellow card) 56' | Report | Castellanos (yellow card) 88' | Stadium: Lumen Field; Attendance: 14,793; Referee: Abdou Ndiaye |

| July 18 16 | Denver Summit | 2–1 | Portland Thorns | Centennial, Colorado |
| 12:00 pm MDT | Sonis 45+8'; Sheehan (yellow card) 80'; Means 86' | Report | Wilson 25' (pen.); Müller (yellow card) 53' | Stadium: Centennial Stadium; Attendance: 12,372; Referee: Jaclyn Metz |

| July 24 17 | Portland Thorns | 2–2 | Gotham FC | Portland, Oregon |
| 7:00 pm PDT | Lyles 21'; Fleming 53'; Müller (yellow card) 56'; Perry (red card) 73'; Arnold (yellow card) 74' | Report | Purce 2'; Carter (yellow card) 40'; Dudley (yellow card) 57'; Kerr 62'; Howell (yellow card) 69' | Stadium: Providence Park; Attendance: 21,743; Referee: Katja Koroleva |

| August 2 18 | Utah Royals | 5–1 | Portland Thorns | Sandy, Utah |
| 5:00 pm MDT | Delzer 35', 47'; Mozingo 68'; Palacios 79'; Del Fava 89' | Report | Wilson 1' | Stadium: America First Field; Attendance: 6,243; Referee: Matthew Corrigan |

| August 9 19 | Boston Legacy | 3–4 | Portland Thorns | Pawtucket, Rhode Island |
| 4:00 pm EDT | St-Georges 31'; Caño 42'; Olivieri (yellow card) 69'; Gutierres 82' | Report | Tordin 2', 10', 37'; Wilson 6'; Nijstad (yellow card) 54'; Vilahamn (red card) 58'; McKenzie (yellow card) 64'; Perry (yellow card) 83'; Weaver (yellow card) 87'; Arnold (yellow card) 90+6' | Stadium: Centreville Bank Stadium; Attendance: 10,223; Referee: Jeremy Scheer |

| August 15 20 | Portland Thorns | 2–1 | Orlando Pride | Portland, Oregon |
| 5:45 pm PDT | Castellanos 58'; Hanks 90+6' | Report | Ovalle (yellow card) 40', (goal) 63'; Doyle (yellow card) 52'; Rafaelle (yellow card) 85' | Stadium: Providence Park; Attendance: 19,106; Referee: Brad Jensen |

| August 22 21 | Portland Thorns | 1–0 | Denver Summit | Portland, Oregon |
| 5:45 pm PDT | Perry (yellow card) 22'; Wilson 44'; Hanks (yellow card) 90+1' | Report | | Stadium: Providence Park; Attendance: 22,017; Referee: Nabil Bensalah |

| August 28 22 | Gotham FC | 1–1 | Portland Thorns | Harrison, New Jersey |
| 8:00 pm EDT | Shaw 60'; Purce (yellow card) 90+6' | Report | Nijstad (yellow card) 43'; Wilson 75' (pen.); Vignola (yellow card) 90+1' | Stadium: Sports Illustrated Stadium; Attendance: 10,379; Referee: Joshua Encarnación |

| September 6 23 | Portland Thorns | 1–2 | Washington Spirit | Portland, Oregon |
| 1:00 pm PDT | Wilson 18' (pen.); Perry (yellow card) 90+3' | Report | Ngock (yellow card) 26'; Rudd (yellow card) 32', (goal) 59' (pen.); Bethi 80'; Sullivan (yellow card) 90+2' (yellow-red card) 90+7' | Stadium: Providence Park; Attendance: 19,065; Referee: Cristian Campo |

| September 13 24 | Portland Thorns | 1–1 | Chicago Stars | Portland, Oregon |
| 4:00 pm PDT | Maitane 22' (o.g.) | Report | Maitane (yellow card) 24'; Wood 90+2' | Stadium: Providence Park; Attendance: 17,066; Referee: Natalie Simon |

| September 19 25 | Orlando Pride | 1–4 | Portland Thorns | Orlando, Florida |
| 4:00 pm EDT | Lemos 30' | Report | Nijstad 3'; Perry (yellow card) 25'; Wilson 28' (pen.); Weaver 74'; Lyles (yellow card) 78', (goal) 88' | Stadium: Inter.co Stadium; Attendance: 7,602; Referee: Elvis Osmanovic |

| September 26 26 | Portland Thorns | 1–1 | Houston Dash | Portland, Oregon |
| 5:45 pm PDT | Müller (yellow card) 77', (goal) 85' | Report | Rader 10'; Van Zanten (yellow card) 39' | Stadium: Providence Park; Attendance: 18,247; Referee: Trevor Wiseman |

| October 3 27 | Portland Thorns | 2–4 | Boston Legacy | Portland, Oregon |
| 5:45 pm PDT | Reyes (yellow card) 6'; Wilson (red card) 22'; Tordin 59' (pen.); Turner (yellow card) 64'; Harvey 90'; Fleming (yellow card) 90+5' | Report | Olivieri (yellow card) 27'; Caño 35'; Schupansky 39'; Murphy (yellow card) 58'; Gutierres 88', 90+3' | Stadium: Providence Park; Attendance: 17,860; Referee: Calin Radosav |

| October 18 28 | Bay FC | 2–2 | Portland Thorns | San Jose, California |
| 2:00 pm PDT | Conti 33', (yellow card) 45'; Fuller 67' | Report | Weaver 10'; Reyes (yellow card) 74'; Hanks 86' | Stadium: PayPal Park; Attendance: 14,451; Referee: Alexandra Billeter |

| October 23 29 | Portland Thorns | 1–0 | North Carolina Courage | Portland, Oregon |
| 7:00 pm PDT | Müller (yellow card) 27', (goal) 60' | Report | Bia (yellow card) 55'; Jackson (yellow card) 79' | Stadium: Providence Park; Attendance: 20,105; Referee: Matthew Thompson |

| November 1 30 | Houston Dash | 0–2 | Portland Thorns | Houston, Texas |
| 4:00 pm CST | | Report | Wilson 34', 70' (pen.); Perry (yellow card) 41' | Stadium: Shell Energy Stadium; Attendance: 8,375; Referee: Joshua Encarnación |

=== Playoffs ===
Quarterfinals
1 | Gotham FC | 1
8 | Seattle Reign FC | 0
4 | Kansas City Current (a.e.t.) | 1
5 | Angel City FC | 0
2 | San Diego Wave FC | 0
7 | Utah Royals | 1
3 | Washington Spirit | 4
6 | Portland Thorns FC | 1

Semifinals
1 | Gotham FC
4 | Kansas City Current
3 | Washington Spirit
7 | Utah Royals

Championship

| November 8, 2026 | Washington Spirit | v | Portland Thorns FC | Washington, District of Columbia |
| 3:00 pm ET | Bethi 6'; Luvanga 34' (yellow card) 62'; Rodman 35', 58'; Morgan (yellow card) 82' | Report | Perry (yellow card) 47' (yellow-red card) 88'; Tordin 51' | Stadium: Audi Field; Attendance: 19,215; Referee: Nabil Bensalah |

== Statistics ==
As of August 15, 2026.

=== Appearances and goals ===
Starting appearances are listed first, followed by substitute appearances after the + symbol where applicable.

| No | Pos | Nat | Player | NWSL Regular Season | | NWSL Playoffs | | Total | |
| No | Pos | Nat | Player | Apps | Goals | Apps | Goals | Apps | Goals |
Goalkeepers
| 18 | GK | (Australia) | Mackenzie Arnold | 17 | 0 | 0 | 0 | 17 | 0 |
| 28 | GK | (United States) | Mackenzie Wood | 0 | 0 | 0 | 0 | 0 | 0 |
| 35 | GK | (United States) | Morgan Messner | 3 | 0 | 0 | 0 | 3 | 0 |
Defenders
| 2 | DF | (Mexico) | Reyna Reyes | 13+3 | 0 | 0 | 0 | 16 | 0 |
| 4 | DF | (United States) | Carolyn Calzada | 6+2 | 0 | 0 | 0 | 8 | 0 |
| 5 | DF | (Denmark) | Isabella Obaze | 10+1 | 0 | 0 | 0 | 11 | 0 |
| 16 | DF | (United States) | Sam Hiatt | 17+2 | 0 | 0 | 0 | 19 | 0 |
| 23 | DF | (Germany) | Marie Müller | 15+3 | 1 | 0 | 0 | 18 | 1 |
| 24 | DF | (United States) | Jayden Perry | 9+6 | 1 | 0 | 0 | 15 | 1 |
| 25 | DF | (United States) | M.A. Vignola | 17+3 | 1 | 0 | 0 | 20 | 1 |
| 29 | DF | (United States) | Mallie McKenzie | 1+9 | 1 | 0 | 0 | 10 | 1 |
Midfielders
| 6 | MF | (Sweden) | Cassandra Bogere | 14+5 | 0 | 0 | 0 | 19 | 0 |
| 13 | MF | (United States) | Olivia Moultrie | 15+1 | 5 | 0 | 0 | 16 | 5 |
| 15 | MF | (United States) | Shae Harvey | 1+4 | 0 | 0 | 0 | 5 | 0 |
| 20 | MF | (Netherlands) | Nina Nijstad | 3+1 | 0 | 0 | 0 | 4 | 0 |
| 21 | MF | (Canada) | Jessie Fleming | 20 | 1 | 0 | 0 | 20 | 1 |
| 41 | MF | (United States) | Renee Lyles | 2+6 | 1 | 0 | 0 | 8 | 1 |
Forwards
| 7 | FW | (United States) | Caiya Hanks | 0+1 | 1 | 0 | 0 | 1 | 1 |
| 9 | FW | (United States) | Sophia Wilson | 17+3 | 9 | 0 | 0 | 20 | 9 |
| 11 | FW | (United States) | Maddie Padelski | 0+6 | 0 | 0 | 0 | 6 | 0 |
| 19 | FW | (United States) | Pietra Tordin | 19+1 | 7 | 0 | 0 | 20 | 7 |
| 22 | FW | (United States) | Morgan Weaver | 0+4 | 0 | 0 | 0 | 4 | 0 |
| 66 | FW | (United States) | Reilyn Turner | 11+2 | 5 | 0 | 0 | 13 | 5 |
| 88 | FW | (Colombia) | Valerin Loboa | 0+1 | 0 | 0 | 0 | 1 | 0 |
Other players (departed during season, out on loan, season-ending injury etc.)
| 1 | GK | (United States) | Bella Bixby^{*} | 0 | 0 | 0 | 0 | 0 | 0 |
| 27 | FW | (France) | Julie Dufour^{*} | 0 | 0 | 0 | 0 | 0 | 0 |
| 26 | FW | (Canada) | Mimi Alidou^{†} | 6+6 | 0 | 0 | 0 | 12 | 0 |
| 32 | GK | (United States) | Erin McKinney^{†} | 0 | 0 | 0 | 0 | 0 | 0 |
| 34 | DF | (Brazil) | Daiane^{†} | 0 | 0 | 0 | 0 | 0 | 0 |
| 40 | MF | (United States) | Jennie Immethun^{†} | 2+2 | 0 | 0 | 0 | 4 | 0 |
| 77 | FW | (United States) | Alexa Spaanstra^{†} | 0+1 | 0 | 0 | 0 | 1 | 0 |
| 10 | FW | (Venezuela) | Deyna Castellanos^{†} | 2+6 | 1 | 0 | 0 | 8 | 1 |

^{*} Player is on the season-ending injury (SEI) list.
^{†} Player left the team mid-season via transfer, loan, or end of contract.

=== Goalscorers ===
| Rank | No. | Pos. | Nat. | Name | NWSL | Playoffs | Total |
|---|---|---|---|---|---|---|---|
| 1 | 9 | FW | (United States) | Sophia Wilson | 9 | 0 | 9 |
| 2 | 19 | FW | (United States) | Pietra Tordin | 7 | 0 | 7 |
| 3 | 13 | MF | (United States) | Olivia Moultrie | 5 | 0 | 5 |
| 3 | 66 | FW | (United States) | Reilyn Turner | 5 | 0 | 5 |
| 5 | 7 | FW | (United States) | Caiya Hanks | 1 | 0 | 1 |
| 5 | 10 | FW | (Venezuela) | Deyna Castellanos | 1 | 0 | 1 |
| 5 | 21 | MF | (Canada) | Jessie Fleming | 1 | 0 | 1 |
| 5 | 23 | DF | (Germany) | Marie Müller | 1 | 0 | 1 |
| 5 | 24 | DF | (United States) | Jayden Perry | 1 | 0 | 1 |
| 5 | 25 | DF | (United States) | M.A. Vignola | 1 | 0 | 1 |
| 5 | 29 | DF | (United States) | Mallie McKenzie | 1 | 0 | 1 |
| 5 | 41 | MF | (United States) | Renee Lyles | 1 | 0 | 1 |
| Total | | | | | 34 | 0 | 34 |

=== Shutouts ===
| Rank | No. | Nat. | Name | NWSL | Playoffs | Total | |
|---|---|---|---|---|---|---|---|
| 1 | 18 | (Australia) | Mackenzie Arnold | 6 | 0 | 6 | |
| 2 | 35 | (United States) | Morgan Messner | 2 | 0 | 2 | |
| 3 | 28 | (United States) | Mackenzie Wood | 0 | 0 | 0 | |
| 3 | Total | | | | 8 | 0 | 8 |

=== Disciplinary record ===
| Rank | No. | Pos. | Nat. | Name | NWSL | | | Playoffs | | | Total | | |
| Rank | No. | Pos. | Nat. | Name | Yellow card | (yellow card) (yellow-red card) | Red card | Yellow card | (yellow card) (yellow-red card) | Red card | Yellow card | (yellow card) (yellow-red card) | Red card |
|---|---|---|---|---|---|---|---|---|---|---|---|---|---|
| 1 | 24 | DF | (United States) | Jayden Perry | 3 | 0 | 1 | 0 | 0 | 0 | 3 | 0 | 1 |
| 2 | 23 | DF | (Germany) | Marie Müller | 3 | 0 | 0 | 0 | 0 | 0 | 3 | 0 | 0 |
| 3 | 6 | MF | (Sweden) | Cassandra Bogere | 1 | 1 | 0 | 0 | 0 | 0 | 1 | 1 | 0 |
| 3 | 10 | FW | (Venezuela) | Deyna Castellanos | 2 | 0 | 0 | 0 | 0 | 0 | 2 | 0 | 0 |
| 3 | 18 | GK | (Australia) | Mackenzie Arnold | 2 | 0 | 0 | 0 | 0 | 0 | 2 | 0 | 0 |
| 3 | 29 | DF | (United States) | Mallie McKenzie | 2 | 0 | 0 | 0 | 0 | 0 | 2 | 0 | 0 |
| 7 | 2 | DF | (Mexico) | Reyna Reyes | 0 | 0 | 1 | 0 | 0 | 0 | 0 | 0 | 1 |
| 7 | 4 | DF | (United States) | Carolyn Calzada | 1 | 0 | 0 | 0 | 0 | 0 | 1 | 0 | 0 |
| 7 | 9 | FW | (United States) | Sophia Wilson | 1 | 0 | 0 | 0 | 0 | 0 | 1 | 0 | 0 |
| 7 | 13 | MF | (United States) | Olivia Moultrie | 1 | 0 | 0 | 0 | 0 | 0 | 1 | 0 | 0 |
| 7 | 15 | DF | (United States) | Sam Hiatt | 1 | 0 | 0 | 0 | 0 | 0 | 1 | 0 | 0 |
| 7 | 19 | FW | (United States) | Pietra Tordin | 1 | 0 | 0 | 0 | 0 | 0 | 1 | 0 | 0 |
| 7 | 20 | MF | (Netherlands) | Nina Nijstad | 1 | 0 | 0 | 0 | 0 | 0 | 1 | 0 | 0 |
| 7 | 22 | FW | (United States) | Morgan Weaver | 1 | 0 | 0 | 0 | 0 | 0 | 1 | 0 | 0 |
| 7 | 25 | DF | (United States) | M.A. Vignola | 1 | 0 | 0 | 0 | 0 | 0 | 1 | 0 | 0 |
| 7 | 40 | MF | (United States) | Jennie Immethun | 1 | 0 | 0 | 0 | 0 | 0 | 1 | 0 | 0 |
| Total | | | | | 22 | 1 | 2 | 0 | 0 | 0 | 22 | 1 | 2 |

== Transactions ==
=== Contract extensions ===
| Date | Player | Pos. | Notes | Ref. |
|---|---|---|---|---|
| December 17, 2025 | (United States) Sophia Wilson | FW | Mutual offer for 2026 season agreed upon and triggered. | |
| May 1, 2026 | (United States) Bella Bixby | GK | Signed a one-year contract extension through the 2027 season. | |
| May 5, 2026 | (United States) Morgan Messner | GK | Signed a two-year contract through the 2028 season. | |
| May 12, 2026 | (Australia) Mackenzie Arnold | GK | Mutual offer for 2027 season agreed upon and triggered. | |
| June 9, 2026 | (United States) Jennie Immethun | MF | Short-term contract extension through July 2026. | |
| June 9, 2026 | (United States) Renee Lyles | MF | Signed contract extension until end-of-season. | |
| June 16, 2026 | (Germany) Marie Müller | DF | Mutual offer for 2027 season agreed upon and triggered. | |
| June 30, 2026 | (United States) Sam Hiatt | DF | Signed a one-year contract extension through the 2027 season. | |
| July 16, 2026 | (Canada) Jessie Fleming | MF | Signed a two-year contract extension through the 2028 season. | |
| July 17, 2026 | (United States) Pietra Tordin | FW | Signed a multi-year contract extension through the 2029 season. | |

=== Transfers in ===
| Date | Player | Pos. | Previous club | Fee/notes | Ref. |
|---|---|---|---|---|---|
| December 29, 2025 | (United States) Shae Harvey | MF | (United States) Stanford | Signed a three-year contract through the 2028 season. | |
| January 8, 2026 | (United States) Maddie Padelski | FW | (United States) Alabama Crimson Tide | Signed a two-year contract through the 2027 season. | |
| January 22, 2026 | (United States) Carolyn Calzada | DF | (United States) Notre Dame | Signed a two-year contract with a 2028 season mutual option. | |
| January 29, 2026 | (Norway) Cassandra Bogere | MF | (Norway) SK Brann | Signed a three-year contract with a 2029 season mutual option for an undisclosed transfer fee. | |
| March 5, 2026 | (United States) Erin McKinney | GK | (United States) Fort Lauderdale United | Signed a short-term contract through March 2026. | |
| March 12, 2026 | (United States) Jennie Immethun | MF | (United States) UCLA Bruins | Signed a short-term contract through to May 31, 2026. | |
| March 12, 2026 | (United States) Renee Lyles | MF | (United States) Clemson Tigers | Signed a short-term contract through to May 31, 2026. | |
| July 7, 2026 | (Netherlands) Nina Nijstad | MF | (Netherlands) PSV Eindhoven | Signed a three-year contract through the 2029 season for an undisclosed transfer fee. | |

=== Loans in ===
| Date | Player | Pos. | From club | Fee/notes | Ref. |
|---|---|---|---|---|---|
| March 12, 2026 | (United States) Mackenzie Wood | GK | (United States) Chicago Stars | Loaned until end of season. | |

=== Transfers out ===
| Date | Player | Pos. | Destination club | Fee/notes | Ref. |
|---|---|---|---|---|---|
| December 1, 2025 | (United States) Olivia Wade-Katoa | MF | Retirement | Out of contract. | |
| December 1, 2025 | (Nigeria) Nicole Payne | DF | (United States) Orlando Pride | Out of contract. | |
| December 1, 2025 | (United States) Naomi Powell | MF | | Out of contract. | |
| December 1, 2025 | (Australia) Kaitlyn Torpey | DF | (England) Newcastle United | Out of contract. | |
| January 14, 2026 | (United States) Sam Coffey | MF | (England) Manchester City | Traded in exchange for an undisclosed transfer fee. | |
| June 18, 2026 | (Brazil) Daiane | DF | (Mexico) Monterrey | Traded in exchange for an undisclosed transfer fee. | |
| July 8, 2026 | (Canada) Mimi Alidou | FW | (Canada) Montreal Roses | Transferred in exchange for an undisclosed fee. | |
| July 24, 2026 | (United States) Alexa Spaanstra | FW | (United States) Utah Royals | Traded in exchange for $25,000 in intra-league transfer fees and up to $7,500 in conditional add-ons. | |
| July 30, 2026 | (United States) Jennie Immethun | MF | (United States) Angel City FC | Left as a free transfer. | |

=== Loans out ===
| Date | Player | Pos. | To club | Notes | Ref. |
|---|---|---|---|---|---|
| January 9, 2026 | (Brazil) Daiane | DF | (Mexico) Monterrey | Short-term loan through July 16, 2026. | |
| March 22, 2026 | (United States) Alexa Spaanstra | FW | (United States) Utah Royals | Short-term loan through July 2026. | |

=== Injury listings ===
| Date | Player | Pos. | List | Injury | Ref. |
|---|---|---|---|---|---|
| June 20, 2025 | (United States) Caiya Hanks | FW | Season-ending injury | Sustained a left knee anterior cruciate ligament tear during a game against Washington Spirit on June 15, 2025. Returned to the active roster on August 14, 2026. | |
| September 25, 2025 | (France) Julie Dufour | FW | Season-ending injury | Left knee anterior cruciate ligament injury sustained during a match against San Diego Wave on September 20, 2025. | |
| January 31, 2026 | (United States) Bella Bixby | GK | Season-ending injury | Sustained a left knee anterior cruciate ligament injury during pre-season training. | |
| August 11, 2026 | (United States) Olivia Moultrie | MF | Season-ending injury | Sustained a right knee anterior cruciate ligament injury during a training session. | |
