= Jennie Immethun =

American soccer player (born 2004)

- Immethun with Angel City FC in 2026

Personal information
- Full name: Jennifer Kate Immethun
- Date of birth: August 25, 2004 (age 22)
- Place of birth: Fremont, California, U.S.
- Height: 5 ft 5 in (1.65 m)
- Positions: Defensive midfielder; center back

Team information
- Current team: Angel City
- Number: 40

Youth career
- De Anza Force South
- 2018–2019: San Jose Earthquakes
- 2020: FC Bay Area
- 2021–2022: FC Bay Area Surf

College career
Years	Team	Apps	(Gls)
2022	Loyola Marymount Lions	17	(0)
2023–2024	TCU Horned Frogs	37	(0)
2025	UCLA Bruins	17	(0)

Senior career*
Years	Team	Apps	(Gls)
2023	San Francisco Glens	–	(–)
2026	Portland Thorns	4	(0)
2026–	Angel City	2	(0)
- * Club domestic league appearances and goals as of 06:00, November 12, 2026 (UTC)

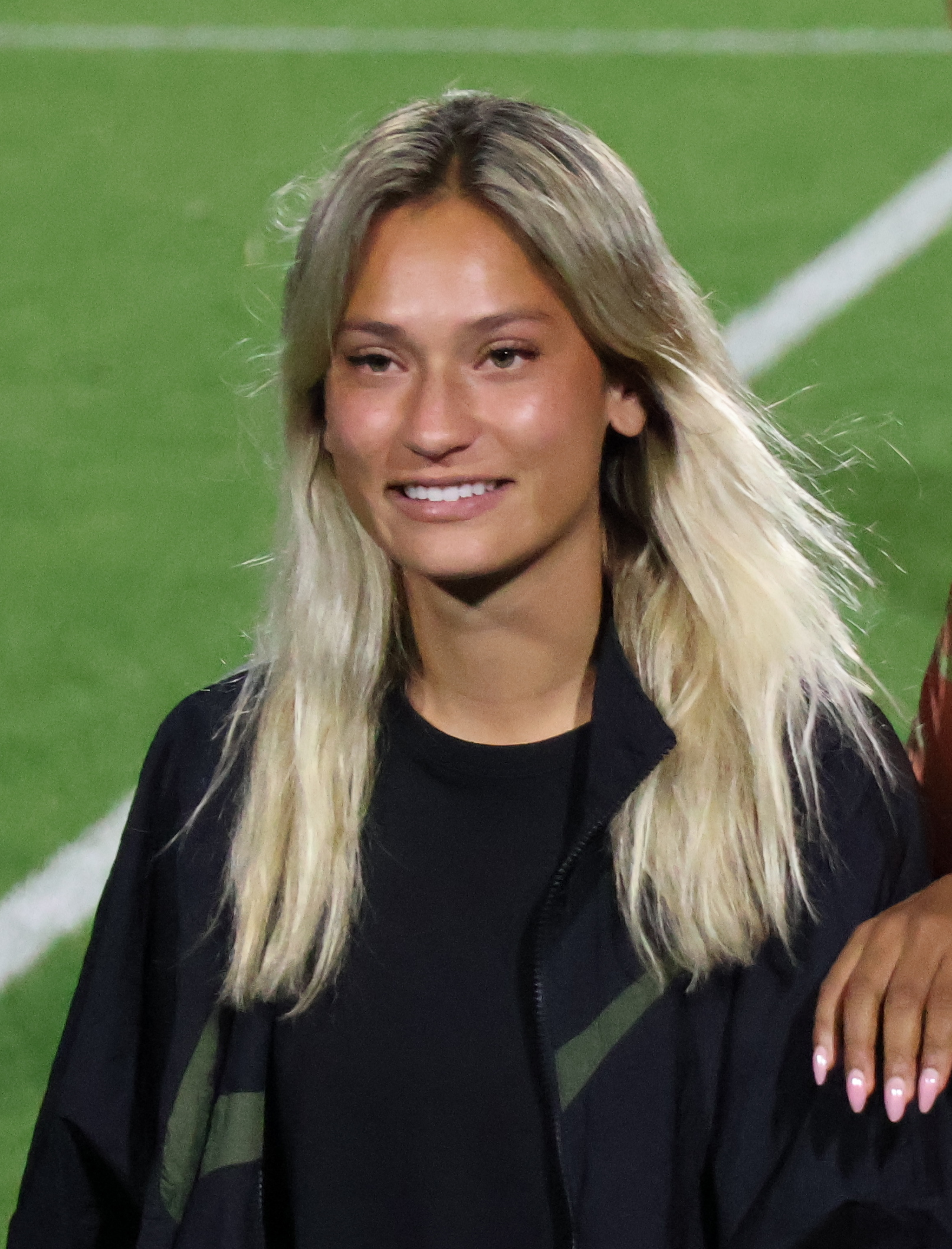
Immethun in 2026

Jennifer Kate Immethun (born August 25, 2004) is an American professional soccer player who plays as a defensive midfielder or center back for Angel City FC of the National Women's Soccer League (NWSL). She played college soccer for the Loyola Marymount Lions, the TCU Horned Frogs, and the UCLA Bruins, earning second-team All-American honors while at UCLA. She started her professional career with Portland Thorns FC.

== Early life ==
Born in Fremont, California, to Dave and Dara Immethun, Immethun grew up in the nearby city of San Jose. She started playing club soccer for De Anza Force South before joining the San Jose Earthquakes' academy in 2018. She later switched to FC Bay Area before rounding out her youth career with FC Bay Area Surf. With her club teams, she won three consecutive youth national championships. Immethun attended Piedmont High School, where she earned one varsity letter with the soccer team. Upon departing from high school, Immethun was ranked by TopDrawerSoccer as the 55th-best club soccer player in the nation.

== College career ==
=== Loyola Marymount Lions ===
Immethun began matriculating at Loyola Marymount University after graduating. She spent one season with the Lions soccer team, appearing in all 17 of Loyola Marymount's matches and starting in all but two.

=== TCU Horned Frogs ===
Ahead of the 2023 season, Immethun transferred to Texas Christian University. Before diving into her sophomore season of college soccer, Immethun spent the summer of 2023 back at home in the Bay Area, playing for the San Francisco Glens of the pre-professional USL W League. As a sophomore with the TCU Horned Frogs later in 2023, Immethun started in 10 of TCU's 15 matches.

Immethun found even more success the following year, earning All Big-12 second team honors after lifting the Horned Frogs to a Big 12 Conference regular season title. She had played the entire 90 minutes in 11 matches and had helped contribute to 7 shutouts on the year.

=== UCLA Bruins ===
In 2025, Immethun transferred for the second time, returning to her home state of California and enrolling in the University of California, Los Angeles. After a strong debut performance for the Bruins in August 2025, she was named the Big Ten Defensive Player of the Week. She continued to post positive performances for the Bruins and earned a place on the Mac Hermann Trophy midseason watchlist in October 2025. Immethun went on to start every match of the season and lead the team in minutes played, staying on the pitch for the entirety of all of UCLA's matches except for one. She worked with the rest of the Bruins' defensive unit to allow only 10 goals on the year and record the second-best goals against average across the nation. Immethun was named to the All-America and All-Big Ten second teams at the end of the year.

== Club career ==
=== Portland Thorns ===
National Women's Soccer League (NWSL) club Portland Thorns FC invited Immethun to the team's preseason roster as a trialist ahead of the 2026 season. Immethun was called on to play minutes in the Thorns' preseason matches, both in the Coachella Valley Invitational and in a friendly against Liga MX Femenil club Monterrey. In March 2026, she signed her first professional contract with the Thorns, inking a short-term deal until the end of May 2026. She made her pro debut on May 20, coming on as a second-half substitute for Cassandra Bogere in a 2–0 victory over Bay FC. On June 9, 2026, the Thorns announced that Immethun's contract had been extended two additional months, now lasting through July. Immethun made 4 appearances (2 starts) before departing from Portland at the end of her contract.

=== Angel City ===
On July 31, 2026, Immethun signed for Angel City FC on a short-term roster relief deal lasting through September 6. Once her initial contract expired, Immethun re-signed with Angel City through the end of 2026.

== Honors and awards ==
TCU Horned Frogs

- Big 12 Conference: 2024

Individual

- Second-team All-American: 2025
- First-team All-Big Ten: 2025
- Second-team All-Big 12: 2024
