= Carolyn Calzada =

American soccer player (born 2003)

- Calzada with the Portland Thorns in 2026

Personal information
- Full name: Carolyn Lisette Calzada
- Date of birth: March 6, 2003 (age 23)
- Place of birth: Sugar Hill, Georgia, U.S.
- Height: 5 ft 9 in (1.75 m)
- Positions: Right back; center back

Team information
- Current team: Portland Thorns
- Number: 4

Youth career
- 2006–2012: United Fútbol Academy
- 2012–2015: Concord Fire
- 2016–2022: Tophat SC

College career
Years	Team	Apps	(Gls)
2022–2024	Texas A&M Aggies	54	(0)
2025	Notre Dame Fighting Irish	18	(0)

Senior career*
Years	Team	Apps	(Gls)
2026–	Portland Thorns	18	(0)

International career^{‡}
2019	United States U17	3	(0)
2026–	United States U23	1	(0)
- * Club domestic league appearances and goals as of 17:56, November 11, 2026 (UTC) ‡ National team caps and goals as of 14:10, March 8, 2026 (UTC)

Carolyn Lisette Calzada (born March 6, 2003) is an American professional soccer player who plays as a right back or center back for Portland Thorns FC of the National Women's Soccer League (NWSL). She played college soccer for the Texas A&M Aggies and the Notre Dame Fighting Irish.

== Early life ==
Calzada grew up in Sugar Hill, Georgia. She played a variety of sports as a child before focusing completely on soccer. She joined club team Tophat SC in 2016, where she contributed to three regional championship titles and one second place national finish. Calzada played one season of varsity soccer for Buford High School as captain. She led the team to its best record in program history, not conceding a single goal and advancing to the Georgia state semifinals. Calzada, who registered 15 goals and 12 assists, was named regional player of the year and received all-state honors. She also ran cross country, qualifying for a state meet in 2019.

== College career ==
=== Texas A&M Aggies ===
Calzada graduated early from high school in order to enroll early at Texas A&M University. In her first season with the Aggies soccer team, she started in each of her 17 appearances. She was named the team's 2022 Newcomer of the Year and earned a slot on the SEC All-Freshman team. She also recorded two assists, both of which occurred less than a week apart from each other.

As a sophomore, Calzada was named team defensive MVP after she helped Texas A&M register nine shutouts on the year. She was also recognized on the All-SEC first team, United Soccer Coaches All-Southeast Region team, and SEC All-tournament team; TopDrawerSoccer ranked her as one of the 100 best college players in the nation. Calzada's junior year was her last as an Aggie. She was one of the team's co-captains and received All-SEC second team honors. She left the program having made 54 appearances, all of which were as a starter.

=== Notre Dame Fighting Irish ===
On December 12, 2024, Calzada transferred to the University of Notre Dame as a graduate student; she also received her bachelor's degree in allied health from Texas A&M on the same day. She participated in 18 matches for the Fighting Irish in 2025. Her efforts helped the team reach second place in the 2025 ACC tournament and the second round of the NCAA tournament.

== Club career ==
National Women's Soccer League club Portland Thorns FC announced that they had signed Calzada to her first professional contract, a two-year deal with a mutual option for a third year, on January 22, 2026. On February 21, Calzada made her professional debut during the preseason Coachella Valley Invitational tournament, substituting on at halftime for Jayden Perry. On April 26, she made her first NWSL regular season appearance and first professional start, playing the entirety of a 2–1 victory over Angel City FC and earning her first professional assist on Pietra Tordin's opening goal. A center back in college, Calzada was also deployed at right back throughout her rookie year. She started on the flank in the Thorns' first-round playoff match to the Washington Spirit, but conceded a turnover that resulted in the Spirit's opening goal and was subbed off later in the first half; the game ended 4–1 in Washington's favor. Calzada started in all but two of her 18 appearances across her first NWSL season.

== International career ==
In 2019, Calzada was called up to the United States under-17 national team ahead of the UEFA Development Tournament. She participated in all three of the team's matches as the United States won the tournament, picking up victories against the Czech Republic, Belgium, and the Republic of Ireland. On April 21, 2021, Calzada was announced as one of the players invited to the under-19 national team's virtual training camp, led by Laura Harvey.

== Personal life ==
Calzada's brother, Zach Calzada, played three seasons of college football at Texas A&M University; the siblings' Aggies sports career did not overlap, with Zach transferring to Auburn University ahead of Carolyn's first collegiate season.

Calzada is of Cuban descent through her paternal grandparents.

== Honors and awards ==
Individual

- First-team All-SEC: 2023
- Second-team All-SEC: 2024
- SEC all-freshman team: 2022
- SEC tournament all-tournament team: 2023
