= Mallie McKenzie =

American soccer player (born 2000)

- McKenzie with the Portland Thorns in 2026

Personal information
- Full name: Mallie Elizabeth McKenzie
- Date of birth: November 13, 2000 (age 25)
- Place of birth: Roswell, Georgia, United States
- Height: 5 ft 9 in (1.75 m)
- Position: Right back

Team information
- Current team: Portland Thorns
- Number: 29

Youth career
- UFA Milton

College career
Years	Team	Apps	(Gls)
2019–2023	Georgia Bulldogs	98	(6)

Senior career*
Years	Team	Apps	(Gls)
2024–	Portland Thorns	38	(1)
- * Club domestic league appearances and goals as of 17:59, November 11, 2026 (UTC)

Mallie Elizabeth McKenzie (born November 13, 2000) is an American professional soccer player who plays as a right back for Portland Thorns FC of the National Women's Soccer League (NWSL). She played college soccer for the Georgia Bulldogs.

== Early life ==
McKenzie was born in Roswell, Georgia. She attended Roswell High School, where she set the school record for all-time goals scored. She played youth soccer for UFA Milton after joining the team in eighth grade and helped lead Milton to three Georgia State Cup championships. She was the 2018 7A Player of the Year and was named to the All-Region Team in all four years of her high school career. McKenzie also ran track in her senior year and was a letterwinner in cross-country. In 2019, she placed third at the Georgia 7A state championship in the 800M.

== College career ==
McKenzie attended the University of Georgia, where she played for the Georgia Bulldogs for five seasons. McKenzie scored her first collegiate goal on September 9, 2021, in a 5–1 victory over Presbyterian. In her senior year, McKenzie took part in her team's first NCAA appearance in 8 years; the Bulldogs' tournament ended in the second round after facing defeat at the hands of North Carolina.

During McKenzie's final year of college, UGA won both the SEC East season title and the SEC Championship for the first time in program history. In the SEC Championship match, McKenzie forced an own goal from an Arkansas defender that would end up being the match's game-winner. She also played a key role in the semifinal game, scoring and tallying an assist. Georgia ended the season with the highest ranking in program history. McKenzie was named to the 2023 SEC All-Tournament Team. McKenzie left Georgia as the leader in career appearances at 98 and fourth in assists with 22. She also scored 6 goals while primarily playing as a wingback, although officially listed as a midfielder.

== Club career ==
McKenzie was originally not included in Portland Thorns FC's 2024 preseason roster. However, going into the Coachella Invitational Tournament, the Thorns elected to add McKenzie to their squad as a non-roster invitee due to key international absences. On March 21, 2024, the Thorns signed McKenzie to her first professional contract, a one-year deal. She made her pro debut in the NWSL x Liga MX Femenil Summer Cup against Club Tijuana. She started all three Summer Cup matches and registered an assist against the Utah Royals. She made her NWSL debut against NJ/NY Gotham FC on August 24, replacing Alexa Spaanstra in the 78th minute of the match.

In December 2024, McKenzie signed a one-year contract extension with Portland. She became a regular substitute in her second year with the Thorns, appearing in 23 regular season matches and making 8 starts as the Thorns finished third in the NWSL standings. She came on as a substitute for Kaitlyn Torpey in both of Portland's playoff matches as the Thorns were eliminated in the semifinals by the Washington Spirit.

On May 20, 2026, McKenzie scored her first professional goal, contributing to a 2–0 win over Bay FC that broke the NWSL's record for home shutout minutes.

== Career statistics ==
=== Club ===
As of 21 May 2026 (UTC)

Appearances and goals by club, season and competition
Club	Season	League			Cup		Playoffs (Note: Includes NWSL Playoffs)		Continental (Note: Includes CONCACAF W Champions Cup)		Other		Total	
Club	Season	Division	Apps	Goals	Apps	Goals	Apps	Goals	Apps	Goals	Apps	Goals	Apps	Goals
Portland Thorns FC	2024	NWSL	1	0	—		0	0	3	0	3 (Note: Appearance(s) in the NWSL x Liga MX Femenil Summer Cup)	0	7	0
Portland Thorns FC	2025	NWSL	23	0	—		1	0	1	0	—		25	0
Portland Thorns FC	2026	NWSL	5	1	—		0	0	0	0	—		5	1
Career total			29	1	0	0	1	0	4	0	3	0	37	1
