= Isabella Bryld Obaze =

Danish footballer (born 2002)

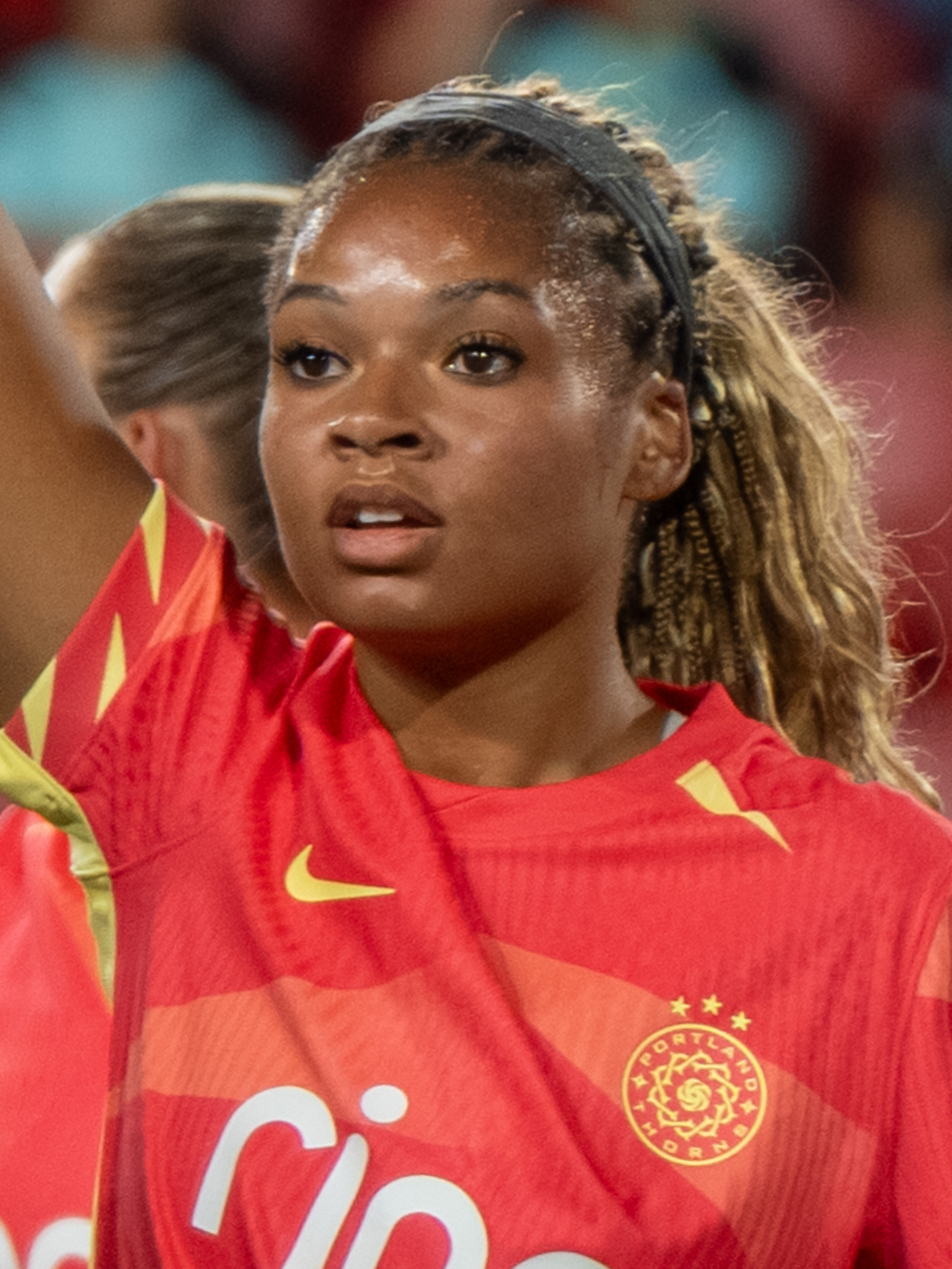
- Obaze with the Portland Thorns in 2025

Personal information
- Full name: Isabella Bryld Obaze
- Date of birth: 30 October 2002 (age 24)
- Place of birth: Kolding, Denmark
- Height: 1.79 m (5 ft 10 in)
- Position: Centre-back

Team information
- Current team: Portland Thorns
- Number: 5

Youth career
- 2017–2018: KoldingQ

Senior career*
Years	Team	Apps	(Gls)
2018–2020	KoldingQ	27	(0)
2020–2022	HB Køge	43	(0)
2022–2023	FC Rosengård	20	(1)
2024–	Portland Thorns	48	(0)

International career^{‡}
2018	Denmark U16	5	(1)
2018–2019	Denmark U17	13	(0)
2019–2020	Denmark U19	8	(1)
2023	Denmark U23	4	(1)
2022–	Denmark	15	(1)
- * Club domestic league appearances and goals as of 04:52, 9 November 2026 (UTC) ‡ National team caps and goals as of 1 December 2025

Isabella Bryld Obaze (born 30 October 2002) is a Danish professional footballer who plays as a centre-back for National Women's Soccer League (NWSL) club Portland Thorns and the Denmark national team.

== Club career ==
Obaze played in the youth clubs of Danish club KoldingQ (now called Kolding IF Women) and became a member of the senior team starting in the 2018–2019 season. In December 2020 she transferred to HB Køge, playing there for two years.

In December 2022 she transferred to Swedish club FC Rosengård. She scored her first goal for Rosengård on 11 November 2023 against IFK Kalmar.

In January 2024 it was announced that she had been transferred to NWSL team Portland Thorns FC for the 2024 season.

Her first season with the Thorns, she contested 1,017 minutes across 13 appearances and has appeared in 18 matches with over 1,800 minutes so far in 2025, playing as a starter on the backline.

== International career ==
Obaze was born in Denmark and is of Nigerian descent. She was a youth international for Denmark, participating in the 2019 UEFA Under-17 European Championship in Bulgaria. Obaze most recently played for the Denmark national under-19 team at the 2020 La Manga Tournament. She first played for the senior Denmark team in a friendly against Italy on 16 February 2022 and appeared in four UEFA Women's Nation's League games in fall 2023 as well as being called up for games in the summer and fall of 2025.

== Career statistics ==
=== International ===
As of match played 3 June 2025

Appearances and goals by national team and year
National team	Year	Apps	Goals
Denmark	2022	1	0
Denmark	2023	4	0
Denmark	2024	6	1
Denmark	2025	3	0
Total		14	1

Scores and results list Denmark's goal tally first, score column indicates score after each Obaze goal.

List of international goals scored by Isabella Bryld Obaze
No.	Date	Venue	Opponent	Score	Result	Competition
1	25 October 2024	Aalborg Stadium, Aalborg, Denmark	South Africa	1–0	5–0	Friendly
