= Portland Thorns FC =

Soccer team and National Women's Soccer League franchise in Portland, Oregon

- Founded: 2012 (14 years ago)
- Stadium: Providence Park; Portland, Oregon
- Capacity: 25,218
- Owner: RAJ Sports
- General manager: Jeff Agoos
- Head coach: Robert Vilahamn
- League: National Women's Soccer League
- 2026: Regular season: 6th of 16; Playoffs: Quarter-finals
- Website: thorns.com
Home colors	Away colors

Portland Thorns FC is an American professional soccer team based in Portland, Oregon, that competes in the National Women's Soccer League (NWSL). Established in 2012, the team began play in 2013 in the then-eight-team NWSL, which received support from the United States Soccer Federation (USSF).

In its inaugural season, Portland Thorns FC placed third during the regular season and, in the playoffs, won the first NWSL championship. The club won the NWSL Shield in 2016 and a second NWSL Championship in 2017. In 2020, they won the Community Shield with the best record in the 2020 NWSL Fall Series. In 2021, the Thorns won the NWSL Challenge Cup, the Women's International Champions Cup, and the NWSL Shield. They followed up in 2022 by winning the NWSL championship.

The Thorns have had the highest average attendance in the league in each of their first eight regular seasons, and set the club's all-time attendance record with a capacity 25,218 attendance on August 11, 2019, in a match against the North Carolina Courage that also set the league's record at the time.

== History ==
The first professional women's soccer team in Portland was started by the Portland Timbers in 2001, competing alongside teams formed by the Seattle Sounders and Vancouver Whitecaps in the USL W-League's W-1 division. In Portland the team was christened the Portland Rain and played the 2000 season in the Pacific Coast Soccer League (PCSL). The team played the 2001 season in the W-League before returning to the PCSL until 2003 when the team folded. Women's soccer was also well-supported via the University of Portland Pilots.

The Portland Rain were re-founded in 2009 when they joined the Women's Premier Soccer League (WPSL). On May 2, 2012 the Portland Timbers partnered with the Portland Rain and the Oregon Youth Soccer Association's (OYSA) Girls Olympic Development Program (ODP). This precursor to the NWSL announcement the following November was to facilitate an integrated development structure for Oregon's girls youth soccer to elite women's competition.

=== NWSL formation ===
The formation of the National Women's Soccer League (NWSL) was announced on November 21, 2012, with Portland selected as a host for one of the eight teams. At that time it was announced by Portland Timbers' owner Merritt Paulson that the Timbers would own the team. The team name was announced on December 13, 2012 as Portland Thorns FC. Also, a logo was unveiled. Both the name and logo were intended to invoke Portland's nickname of the Rose City.

The team announced Cindy Parlow Cone as its first head coach on December 19, 2012. On January 11, 2013, the league held its player allocation for the national team players, with Portland receiving seven players, including former University of Portland Pilots star Christine Sinclair. The other players assigned to the Thorns were Rachel Buehler, Tobin Heath, Karina LeBlanc, Alex Morgan, Marlene Sandoval, and Luz Saucedo.

"We are thrilled with today's allocation, and I see this group of seven players as a terrific foundation for this club," said Parlow Cone. Seattle Reign FC general manager Amy Carnell reacted to the NWSL allocation and Morgan's placement by saying, "I think generally speaking, I could speak for all the clubs when I say I'm extremely surprised they would place (Christine) Sinclair and (Alex) Morgan in the same city. Two of the best strikers in the world in the same city." Carnell said Seattle Reign FC "were a little surprised" they didn't get Morgan, considering that she had spent the previous spring with the Seattle Sounders Women. This reunited Sinclair and Morgan as club mates since winning the regular season and championship title with the Western New York Flash in Women's Professional Soccer's final season.

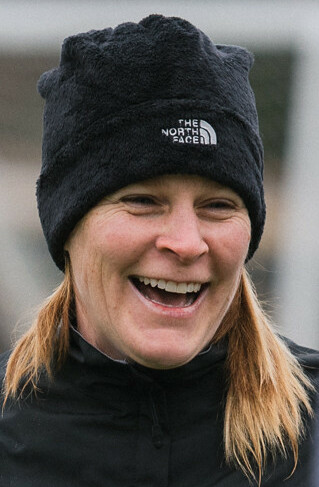
The Thorns hired Cindy Parlow Cone as its first head coach in 2013

=== 2013–2015: Founding and early success ===
Under head coach Parlow Cone, the Thorns played in the new league's inaugural game on April 13, 2013, against host team FC Kansas City, which ended in a 1–1 draw. Sinclair scored the club's first goal on a penalty kick. The team's first home match on April 21 provided the club its first victory, a 2–1 win over Seattle Reign FC. Beyond setting a new league record, the opening day crowd of 16,479 at Jeld-Wen Field eclipsed any single-game attendance from Women's Professional Soccer.

The club finished in a three-way tie atop the league in the regular season standings, but by virtue of goal differential tiebreaker the club claimed the No. 3 seed in the NWSL playoffs. The Thorns beat FC Kansas City 3–2 after extra time in the semi-finals, then beat the Western New York Flash 2–0 in the championship game to become the first NWSL Champions. Parlow Cone resigned as head coach on December 5, 2013, citing personal reasons, particularly the desire to spend more time with her husband, Portland Timbers director of sports science John Cone, who also resigned from his role.

The Thorns kicked off their 2014 season with the announcement of a new head coach, Paul Riley, formerly of the Long Island Fury of the Women's Premier Soccer League. The Thorns broke the club's own NWSL attendance record with 19,123 attending an August 3 game between Portland and new expansion team Houston Dash at newly renamed Providence Park. After finishing third in the regular season, the Thorns qualified for the playoffs but were knocked out in the semi-finals by FC Kansas City.

The Thorns made a number of roster moves in the offseason but struggled during the 2015 Portland Thorns FC season. On June 19, 2015, the Thorns made NWSL history when goalkeeper Michelle Betos headed the equalizing goal for 10-woman Portland in the 95th minute against FC Kansas City, the first goal scored by a goalkeeper in the league. The Thorns also sold out Providence Park for the first time in a match against Seattle Reign FC following the 2015 FIFA Women's World Cup, again setting the league's attendance record with 21,144. However, the Thorns finished in 6th place of the now 9-team league, missing the playoffs for the first and only time in its history. At the end of the season the team announced that head coach Paul Riley's contract was allowed to expire, though reports in 2021 would reveal that Riley had been investigated for alleged sexual harassment and coercion and quietly terminated.

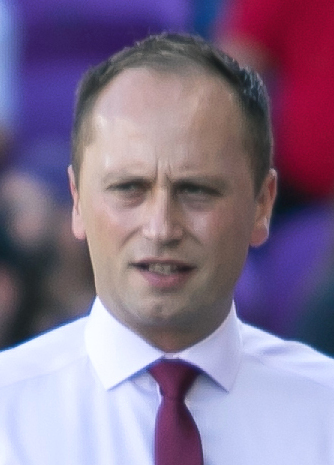
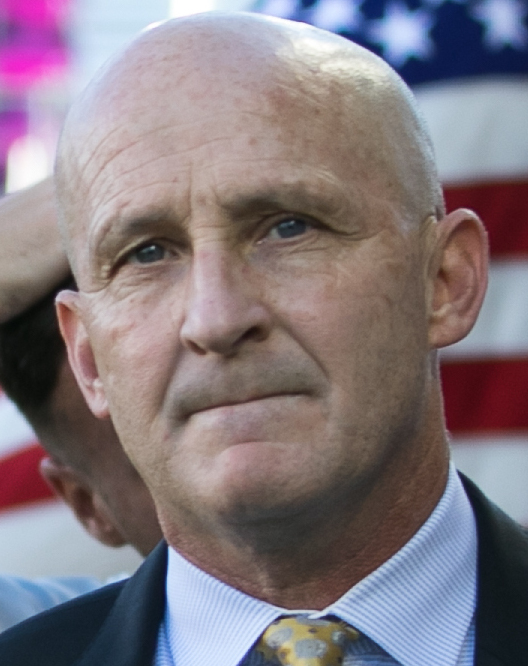
The Thorns hired Washington Spirit coach Mark Parsons (left) in 2015 to replace Paul Riley, who went on to coach the Flash and Courage against the Thorns in three consecutive postseasons

=== 2016–2019: Start of the Parsons era, battles with the Courage ===
On October 5, 2015, the Thorns hired Washington Spirit head coach Mark Parsons to replace Riley. In Parsons's first season in charge, the Thorns executed a series of trades — anchored by moving founding forward Alex Morgan and midfielder Kaylyn Kyle to expansion team Orlando Pride — that resulted in the acquisitions of Emily Sonnett, Lindsey Horan, Meghan Klingenberg, Adrianna Franch, Dagný Brynjarsdóttir, Amandine Henry, and Nadia Nadim. The acquisitions would form the core of a team that won the Thorns its first NWSL Shield in 2016 and host its first playoff match, against Western New York Flash led by their former coach Paul Riley. The physical match ended in regulation as a 2–2 draw, and the Thorns lost 4–3 after extra time.

Parsons' Thorns finished second in the regular season in 2017 behind the Courage and defeated former Thorn Alex Morgan and the Orlando Pride on the way to beating the Courage 1–0 in the NWSL Championship at Orlando City Stadium, the Thorns' second title. Despite losing Henry and Nadim for the 2018 season due to financial limits and trading founding midfielder Allie Long to Seattle Reign FC for the rights to Caitlin Foord, the Thorns finished 2018 again in second place behind the Courage. The Thorns defeated the Reign 2–1 in the Cascadian rivalry's first and only playoff encounter, then faced the Courage once again in a rematch of the previous season's final, this time hosted in the Thorns' home stadium of Providence Park. The Thorns, however, lost 3–0 to the Courage, who became the first team to win the NWSL Shield and Championship in the same season.

The Thorns opened the 2019 season with a six-game road schedule due to ongoing renovations and expansion of Providence Park lost only two of their first 15 matches through July, and set another league attendance record with 25,218 attending the newly expanded Providence Park against the Courage in August. Beginning September at the top of the table, the team entered the worst run of form in Parsons' tenure as head coach, losing three of its last five games, including an embarrassing club-worst 6–0 loss to the Courage. The Thorns finished third in the league and were eliminated from the playoffs in a 1–0 defeat to the Chicago Red Stars.

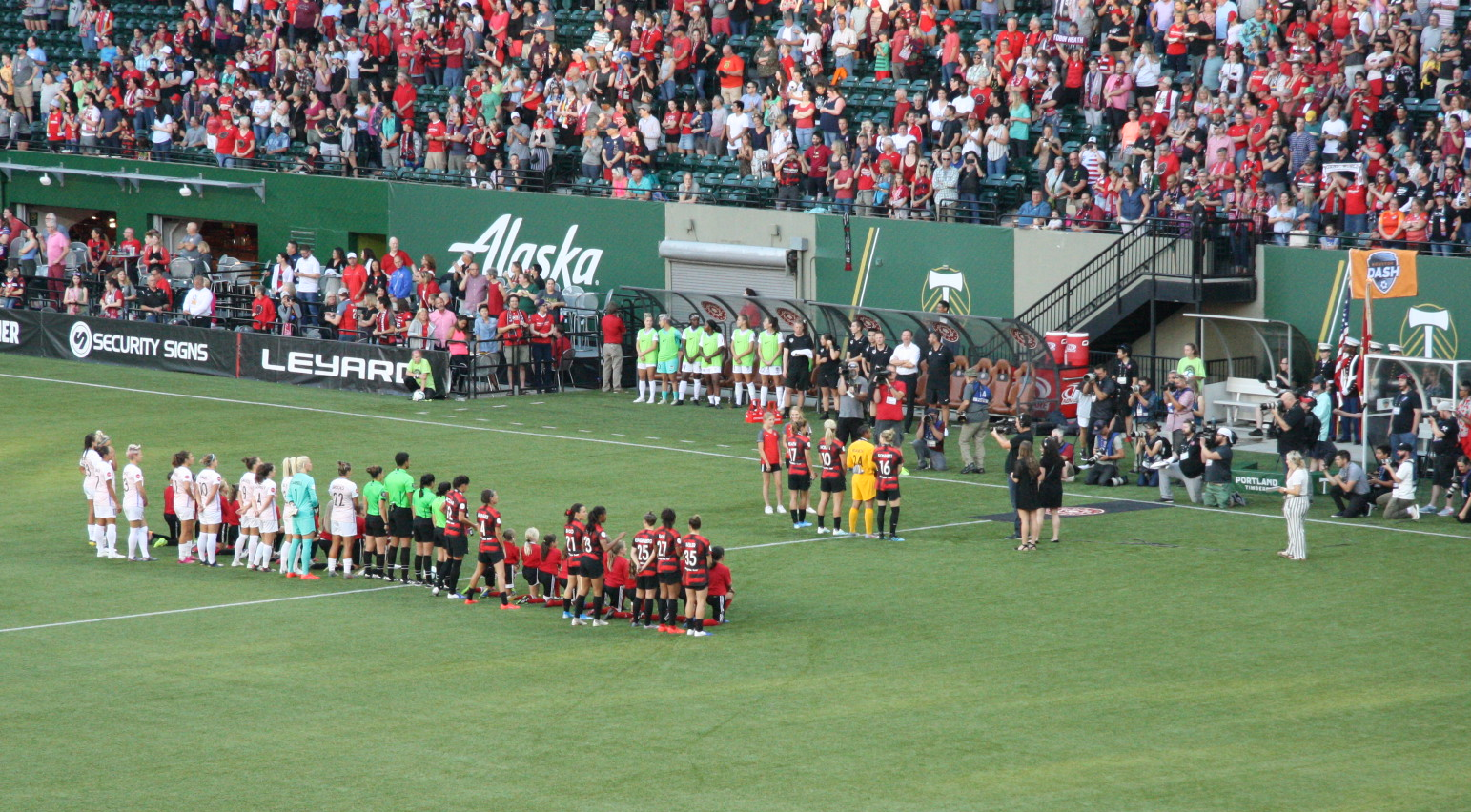
Four Thorns players who won the 2019 FIFA Women's World Cup with the U.S. national team were recognized before the July 24, 2019, match against the Houston Dash.

=== 2020–2021: Pandemic and scandal ===
Due to the impact of the COVID-19 pandemic on sports, the Thorns canceled their preseason tournament in March, followed by the league postponing, then canceling the 2020 NWSL season. The Thorns finished last in the inaugural NWSL Challenge Cup's group stage but upset the top-seeded Courage in the quarterfinals before losing to eventual champions Houston Dash in the semifinals. The Thorns also participated in and clinched the 2020 NWSL Fall Series Community Shield with a win on October 11, 2020, over OL Reign.

In late-September, The Athletic published an investigation into North Carolina Courage head coach Paul Riley, alleging that Riley had sexually coerced and verbally abused players on his teams, including during his two-year tenure as Thorns head coach in 2014 and 2015. More than a dozen players from every team Riley had coached since 2010 spoke to the publication and two named players, both former Thorns, went on the record with allegations against him. In the article, Riley denied the allegations. Later that day, the Courage announced that Riley had been fired due to "very serious allegations of misconduct".

The subsequent fallout resulted in the resignation of league commissioner Lisa Baird and dismissal of league counsel Lisa Levine. A number of Portland Thorns players also released a statement calling for Thorns general manager Gavin Wilkinson to be suspended. Wilkinson was then put on administrative leave from the Thorns while remaining manager of the MLS Portland Timbers, and later fired. President of business Mike Golub, separately accused of sexual harassment of Parlow Cone in the report, was also fired, and Paulson stepped down as CEO of both the Thorns and Timbers.

The U.S. Soccer Federation commissioned a league-wide independent investigation into abusive behavior led by Sally Yates. The report, published on October 3, 2022, indicated that the club "interfered with our access to relevant witnesses and raised specious legal arguments in an attempt to impede our use of relevant documents." The report further detailed how Wilkinson advised other clubs to hire Riley after his departure from the Thorns and downplayed the alleged abuses reported by players.

On the pitch, the Thorns won the West Division of the 2021 NWSL Challenge Cup and hosted the finals in May 2021, defeating NJ/NY Gotham FC 6–5 in a penalty shoot-out following a 1–1 draw in regulation. The Thorns qualified for and hosted the 2021 Women's International Champions Cup as champions of the 2020 Fall Series, and won the friendly tournament by defeating three-time finalists and defending champions Olympique Lyon 1–0. In the regular season, the Thorns clinched their second NWSL Shield on October 17 but again lost in the semi-finals to Chicago.

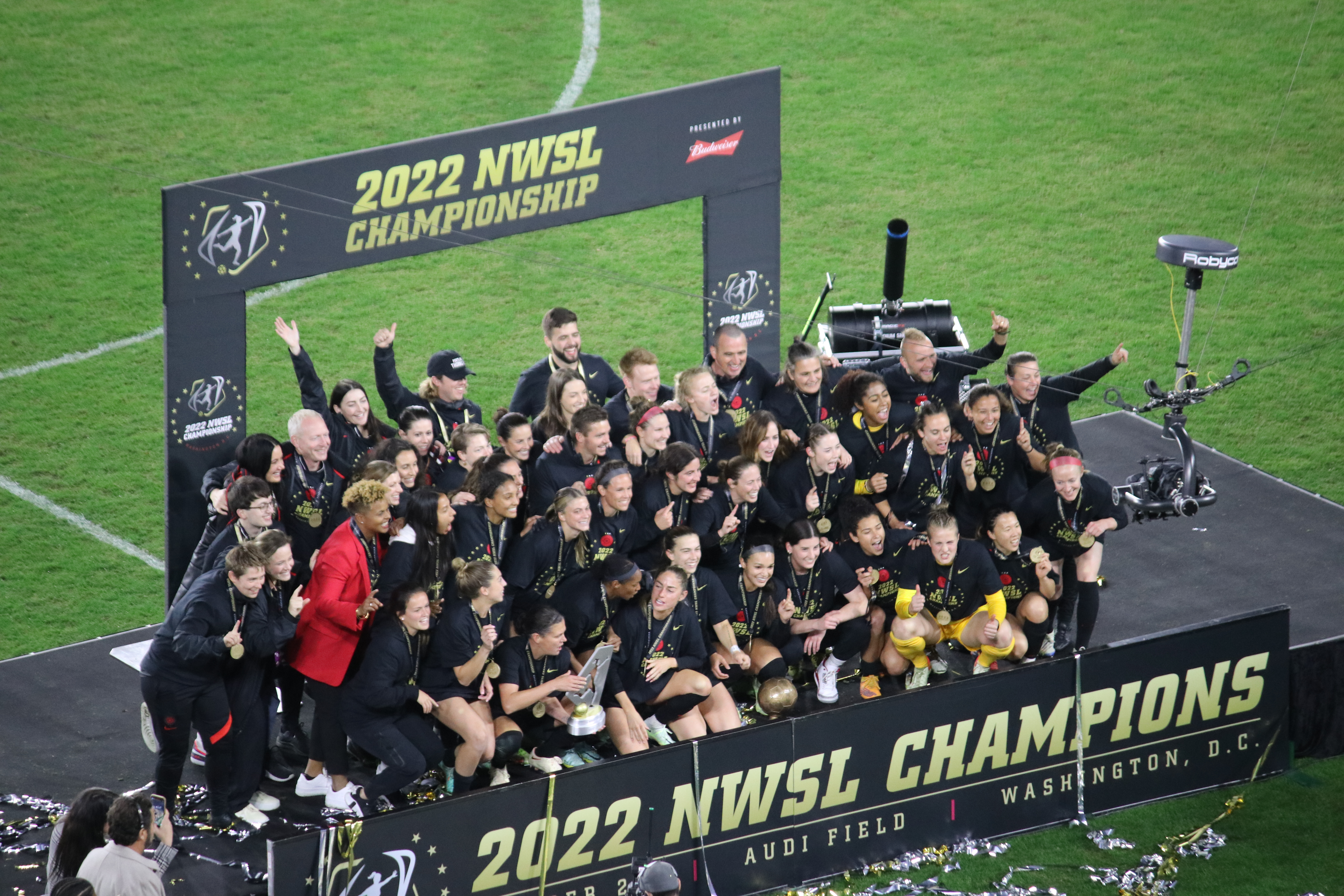
Thorns players and staff celebrate winning the 2022 NWSL Championship at Audi Field.

=== 2022–2024: Transitions and a third star ===
Parsons, who had served as head coach since 2016, left the team after the 2021 season to lead the Netherlands women's national team. The Thorns hired retired former club goalkeeper and Canadian international Karina LeBlanc as Gavin Wilkinson's replacement in the Thorns general manager role in November 2021, then hired former Thorn and fellow Canadian international Rhian Wilkinson as Parsons's replacement. The Thorns finished the 2022 regular season in second place behind OL Reign, and defeated Kansas City Current 2–0 in the championship game to become the first NWSL team to win three championships.

On December 1, 2022, Paulson announced that he was selling the Thorns while retaining the Timbers and control of Providence Park. The next day, Rhian Wilkinson resigned as coach after reports that she exchanged messages of romantic feelings with a Thorns player. The team promoted Wilkinson's assistant Mike Norris to the head coaching role in January 2023.

The 2023 regular season ended with the Thorns again finishing in second place, this time behind the San Diego Wave. They lost their first-round playoff game to NJ/NY Gotham FC in extra time.

On January 3, 2024, the sale of the Thorns to RAJ Sports was completed. On March 27, 2024, Sophia Wilson (then named Sophia Smith) was signed by the Thorns to a two-year contract extension that made her the highest paid player in the NWSL, though her salary was not disclosed. On April 18, 2024, following a four-game winless streak to start the season, the Thorns promoted Norris to Technical Director, named Rob Gale interim head coach, and announced a worldwide search for the permanent head coach. On July 19, 2024, the Thorns announced that Gale would be the permanent head coach.

The 2024 regular season was modestly successful, with the Thorns collecting only one point from their first four games, winning the next six games through mid-May, having mixed results through early July, going winless for three months through early October, and then winning two of their last three games to claim sixth place in the NWSL standings and a playoff spot. The sixth-place finish tied (with 2015) their lowest-ever finish in the league, and the Thorns were eliminated in the first round of the playoffs once again by Gotham FC on November 10. The playoff loss would be the final match of Sinclair's professional career and the end of LeBlanc's tenure as general manager. The Thorns announced on January 7, 2025, that Jeff Agoos would be LeBlanc's successor as general manager. Agoos was also named club president.

On Nov. 25, 2025, the Thorns announced that Gale and the club had agreed to part ways, with assistant coach Sarah Lowdon to serve as interim head coach.

On Mar. 4, 2026, the Thorns announced Robert Vilahamn as the club’s new head coach.

== Identity ==
=== Crest ===
The team crest was designed by artist and Timbers Army member Brent Diskin. Its design originally featured the team colors of red, black, and white "with a protective wreath of thorns surrounding a familiar, stylized rose in the center." The design also includes a pair of four-pointed stars, or hypocycloids, that house the letters "F" and "C" and anchor the sides of the badge, and resemble the star prominent on Portland's official city flag.

From 2018 onward, the team's primary crest was reduced from four to two colors, typically either with a red or black background and red or white features. The team completed its transition to a two- or one-color crest in 2019, when it revealed new secondary kits that discarded the four-color crest. The original design would not reappear in the team's identity until March 2023, with a "Heritage" designation as part of new secondary kits.

=== Colors ===
Portland's first home colors (2013)

The team's colors were announced as red, green, and black. However, the Thorns did not use green in the team's kits until 2023, and from 2019 to 2022 used green in neither its crest nor its kits.

The Thorns unveiled their home and away kits on April 9, 2013. The team's inaugural home kit was rose red with a white stripe, black shorts, and red socks, while the road kit was white with black shorts and socks. Both uniforms featured sponsorships by Providence Health & Services and Parklane Mattresses, and were made by Nike.

In 2019, the Thorns began expanding the use of black as a primary color, with a home kit that had wide black stripe-like blocks. The transition to black as the team's primary color was completed in 2020, with a black shirt printed with gray roses that used a black and red variation on the original crest. The away shirt also used a monochrome black and gray crest and accents. Thorns primary kits since 2020 have all been black with red relegated to an accent color.

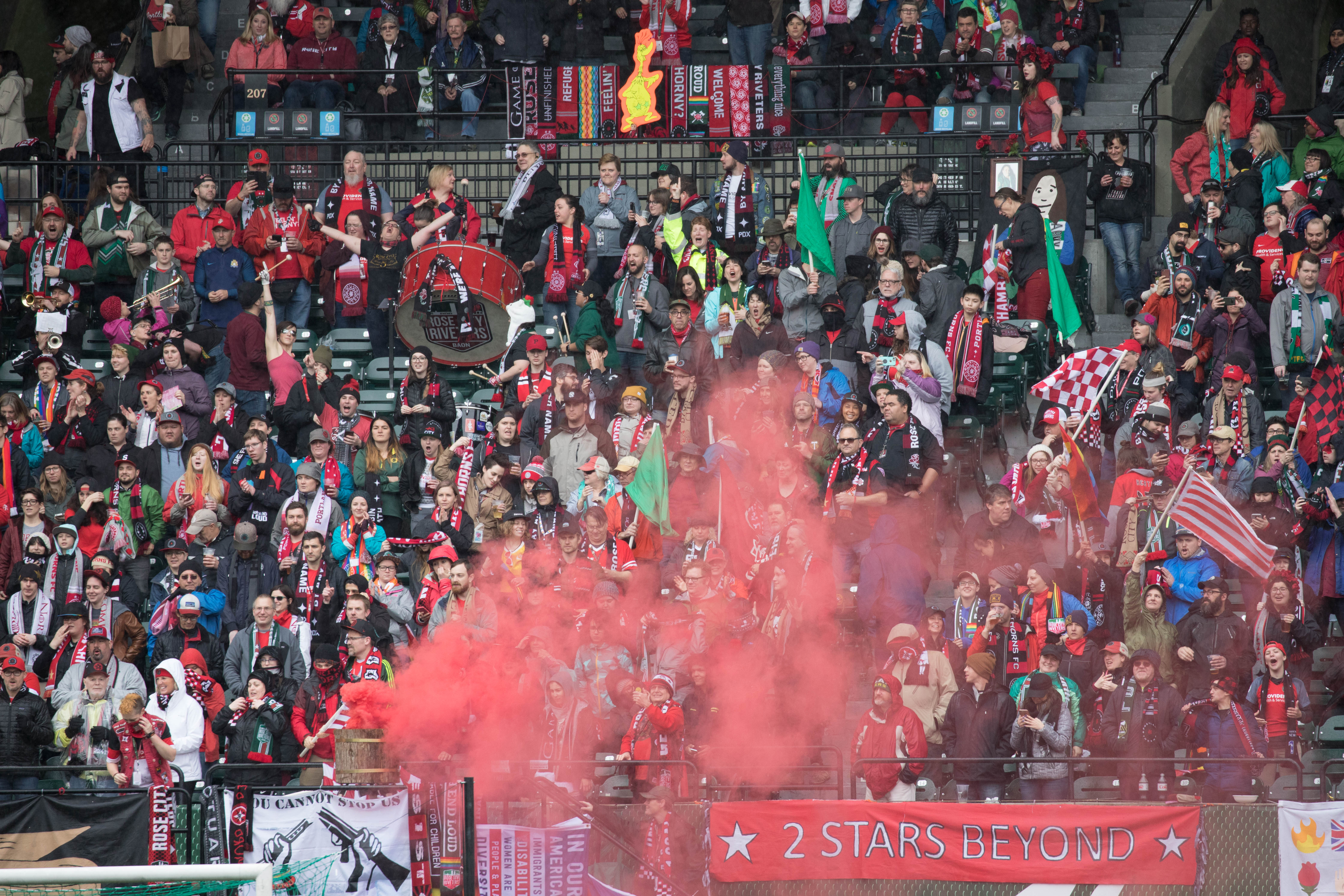
The Rose City Riveters supporters' group cheers and deploys smoke after a Thorns goal.

== Support ==
The Thorns led the NWSL in attendance from 2013 to 2021, and from the inaugural season were the first team to have averaged more than 10,000 per match in league attendance, and in 2019 became the first to average 20,000 per match. Inaugural Thorns coach Cindy Parlow Cone, previously a United States national team player, compared the support and atmosphere at Thorns matches to World Cup and Olympics matches.

The team has a single organized supporters' group, the Rose City Riveters, that is recognized by the Thorns front office with privileges to stand, play instruments, and wave flags in the north general admission stands. Founded by a group composed primarily of members of the Portland Timbers supporters' group Timbers Army in 2013 as the Thorns Alliance, they adopted the Riveters name on April 3 and adopted many of the practices and shared infrastructure with the Timbers Army, including the creation and coordination of large and complex tifo displays and performing football chants throughout the match. Both the Riveters and Timbers are considered part of the umbrella supporters organization 107 Independent Supporters Trust (107IST), named after section 107 in Providence Park that both groups use.

The large crowds attended despite Timbers front office expectations of 7,000 fans per match and little promotion before the team's launch. The front office initially expected to play regular-season matches at Merlo Field of the University of Portland, which had a capacity of less than 5,000, but the Thorns sold more than that number in season tickets before the league's launch and expected to reach 10,000 season tickets sold by 2014. A majority of those season ticket holders did not have season tickets to the sibling Timbers club. The immediate and sustained strength of support prompted other women's clubs to try to replicate the Thorns' success, including formal studies of the role of organized support in women's soccer that focused on the Riveters.

== Rivalries ==
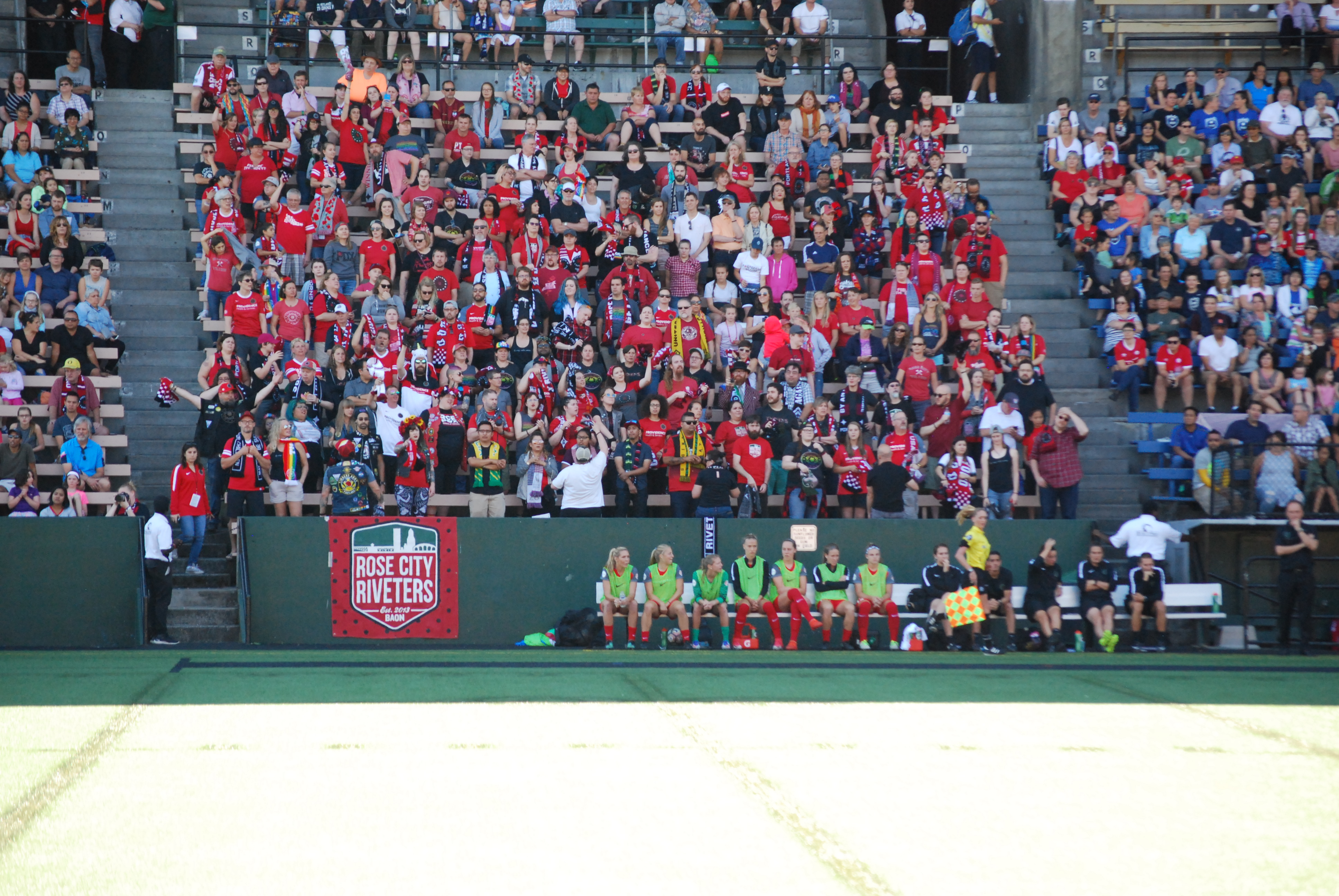
The traveling Rose City Riveters at Seattle's Memorial Stadium in 2017.

=== Seattle ===
Since the NWSL's founding, the Thorns' most intense rivalry has been with the Seattle-based Reign. The Thorns' first home match was a 2–1 win over Seattle, they qualified for the 2014 playoffs by defeating the Reign in the season's final match week, and they didn't win at Seattle's Memorial Stadium until August 2017. The Thorns defeated Seattle in back-to-back home matches in 2018, first in the season's final match week to secure home-pitch advantage, then again in the first round of the playoffs. Matches between Portland and Seattle broke the league's attendance records in April 2013 (16,479), July 2015 (21,144, in Portland) and August 2021 (27,248, in Seattle), and have been staged as double-headers with Major League Soccer's Timbers and Seattle Sounders FC.

Existing rivalries between Portland and Seattle predated the league, but other sources of tension added to the rivalry before the league played a match. National federation allocation placed Seattle Sounders Women player Alex Morgan on Portland, and Portland Pilots national championship teammates Christine Sinclair and Megan Rapinoe on opposing sides, despite Rapinoe requesting Portland as her first-choice destination.

As of June 3, 2023, the Thorns have played more matches against the Reign across the NWSL regular season, playoffs, Challenge Cup, and 2020 Fall Series than any other team in the NWSL, with Portland holding a record of 13–14–8 with a -4 goal differential. The two top goalscorers in the rivalry are Sinclair (11) and Rapinoe (9). Neither team has won more than three matches in a row against the other. Matches between the teams quickly earned a reputation for their physicality. The rivalry continued even as United States players from the Thorns and Reign were in France at the 2019 FIFA Women's World Cup, during which the NWSL continued play with a match between the teams.

Several players have played for both teams, including Allie Long, Michelle Betos, Ifeoma Onumonu, Steph Catley, Jodie Taylor, Adelaide Gay, Amber Brooks, Jessica McDonald, Danielle Foxhoven, Alyssa Kleiner, Kaylyn Kyle, Tobin Heath, and Emily Sonnett.

=== Flash/Courage ===
On the pitch, some of the league's highest-stakes matches were contested between the Thorns and Western New York Flash, who were relocated in 2017 to become the North Carolina Courage. The Thorns and Flash/Courage have met in more NWSL tournament knockout matches than any other combination of NWSL teams, including the 2013, 2017, and 2018 championship matches, 2016 playoff semifinals, and 2020 Challenge Cup quarter-finals. The August 11, 2019, match between Portland and North Carolina set a league attendance record (25,218).

The Flash won the 2013 NWSL Shield by goal-difference tiebreak in a three-team tie for first place that included Portland. The Flash hosted the 2013 championship match, but the Thorns defeated Western New York 2–0. The teams featured rival national team forwards Abby Wambach, the United States player who at the time led all players in international goalscoring playing for the Flash, and Christine Sinclair, the Canadian who would eventually eclipse Wambach's record.

In the 2016 semifinals, the Thorns were the shield winners and the Flash were the lower seed, and the match was the first home playoff game for Portland. But the Flash, who had hired former Thorns head coach Paul Riley at the start of the season, defeated Portland after extra time in a 4–3, highly physical match that featured three goals after the 90th minute. Riley was ejected from the match in the first half for arguing with officials after Christine Sinclair scored the first equalizing goal. The Thorns won their revenge in the 2017 championship match, defeating the Courage 1–0 after a match that Thorns defender Meghan Klingenberg called "the ugliest soccer game I have ever played in" and featured tackles on United States national teammates and opposing club players Taylor Smith and Tobin Heath that both attempted to play through but would rule both players out of national team camp in the following weeks.

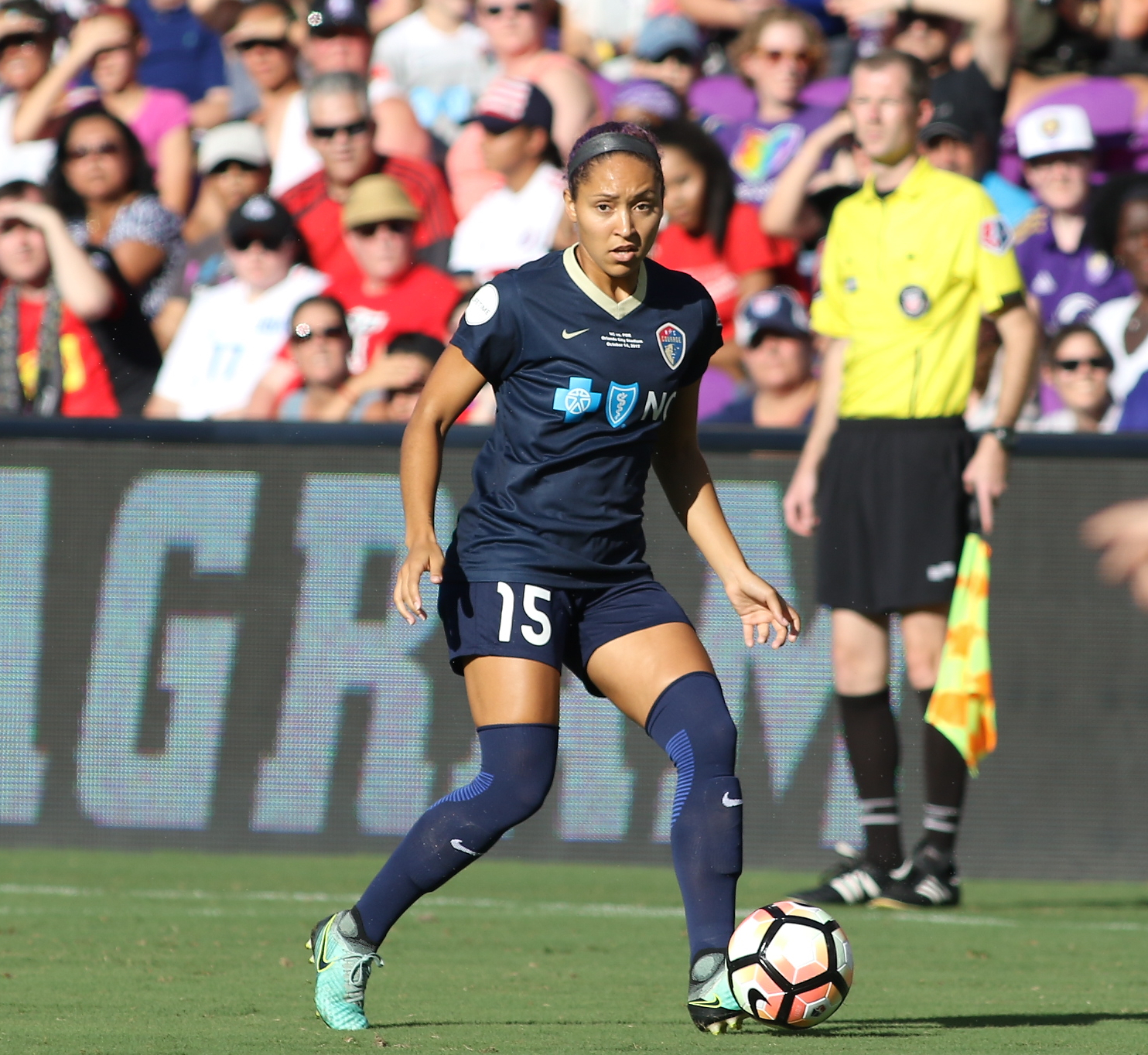
Jaelene Daniels playing for the North Carolina Courage against the Thorns in the 2017 NWSL championship.

Adding to the rivalry was Courage defender Jaelene Daniels's 2018 appearance on The 700 Club about refusing to wear LGBT pride-themed uniforms for the United States national team and being excused from its roster citing "personal reasons", and the relocation of a Courage 2018 playoff match to Portland from Cary, North Carolina due to Hurricane Florence.

Daniels's segment preceded a match against the Thorns in Portland on May 30, 2018. The Riveters were already renowned for supporting LGBTQ causes in Portland, and reported that many of its members were LGBTQ. During the match, the Portland crowd booed Daniels when she was announced during the starting lineups, and again each time she touched the ball. Members of the Riveters designed a rainbow-lettered banner reading "personal reasons" and displayed it at the match. The booing and "personal reasons" banners spread to every road venue where Daniels and the Courage played, and during the Courage's semi-finals match against Chicago Red Stars relocated to Portland days prior due to Hurricane Florence.

The Courage responded by defeating Portland 4–1 in the May 30 match, then 3–0 in the 2018 championship match against — and hosted by — Portland. Jessica McDonald, who had been the Thorns' leading goalscorer in 2014 and had defended Daniels' comments and Christian faith post-match comments on May 30, scored a goal against Portland during the championship match, then removed her jersey to display an undershirt with "Jesus Paid It All" written on it.

== Stadium ==
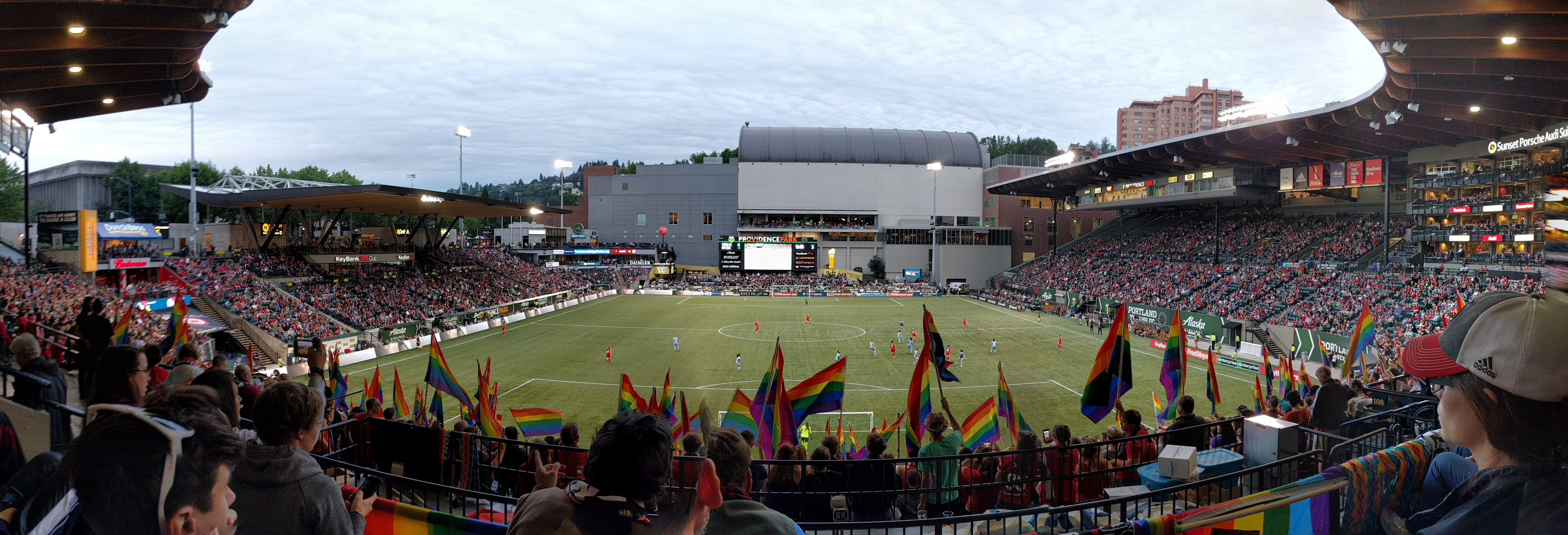
Portland Thorns FC playing Sky Blue FC at Providence Park in 2017, as viewed from the stadium's north end facing the south goal. In 2019, three additional decks were added to the east stands.

The Portland Thorns play at Providence Park, a municipally owned soccer-specific stadium located in the Goose Hollow neighborhood of Portland, Oregon. The Thorns also share the stadium with the Portland Timbers of Major League Soccer, and because the Thorns don't have a dedicated training facility, the team also trains at Providence Park. A provision in the stadium lease allowed parent company Peregrine Sports to cancel its agreement and move the Thorns if their attendance fell to below 7,000 over any two regular-season matches, or 4,000 in any one match.

Upon the NWSL's founding, Providence Park's seated capacity of 21,144 was the third-largest in the NWSL, after the Boston Breakers' Harvard Stadium (30,000) and the 2014 expansion Houston Dash's BBVA Compass Stadium (22,039, now named Shell Energy Stadium). Providence Park was expanded in 2019 to a seated capacity of 25,218, making it the second-largest NWSL venue at the time behind Orlando Pride's Exploria Stadium (25,527). OL Reign moved into 68,740-seat Lumen Field to begin the 2022 season with limited but expandable seating, and 2022 expansion team San Diego Wave FC moved into 32,000-capacity Snapdragon Stadium at the end of its first season.

The Thorns set the NWSL's all-time attendance record several times in Providence Park starting from its home opener on April 21, 2013 (16,479), and twice at the venue's capacity on July 23, 2015 (21,144) and August 11, 2019 (25,218).

== Broadcasting ==
In 2024 Portland Thorns FC games will be broadcast across 5 broadcasting platforms and NWSL's own streaming service. Games will be available on ABC, ESPN+, ESPN Deportes, ESPN2, ION Network, NWSL+, CBS Sports Network, Paramount+ and Prime Video.

In 2021, the team struck a multi-year deal with KPTV and KPDX to be its local broadcast partner.

As of April 2017, Thorns games are streamed exclusively by Go90 for American audiences and via the NWSL website for international viewers. For the 2017 season, the Thorns were featured in six nationally televised Lifetime NWSL Game of the Week broadcasts on April 15, April 29, July 15, August 5, August 26, and September 30, 2017.

During the 2013 season, games were streamed online and broadcast on the radio on Freedom 970 AM. Long-time Portland-area sports reporter and broadcaster Ann Schatz was announced as the play-by-play broadcaster, while Angela Harrison, an All-American goalkeeper with the Portland Pilots, was the color analyst. In 2014, Schatz returned, with former Thorns defender Marian Dougherty, who retired after the 2013 season, joining for color commentary.

== Players ==
=== Squad ===
As of September 9, 2026.

No.	Pos.	Nation	Player
1	GK	USA	Bella Bixby
2	DF	MEX	Reyna Reyes
4	DF	USA	Carolyn Calzada
5	DF	DEN	Isabella Obaze
6	MF	SWE	Cassandra Bogere
7	FW	USA	Caiya Hanks
9	FW	USA	Sophia Wilson
11	FW	USA	Maddie Padelski
13	MF	USA	Olivia Moultrie
15	MF	USA	Shae Harvey
16	DF	USA	Sam Hiatt (Captain)
18	GK	AUS	Mackenzie Arnold
19	FW	USA	Pietra Tordin
20	MF	NED	Nina Nijstad
21	MF	CAN	Jessie Fleming
22	FW	USA	Morgan Weaver
23	DF	GER	Marie Müller
24	DF	USA	Jayden Perry
25	DF	USA	M.A. Vignola
27	FW	FRA	Julie Dufour
28	GK	USA	Mackenzie Wood (on loan from Chicago Stars FC)
29	DF	USA	Mallie McKenzie
35	GK	USA	Morgan Messner
41	MF	USA	Renee Lyles
66	FW	USA	Reilyn Turner
88	FW	COL	Valerin Loboa

=== Former players ===
For details of former players, see Category:Portland Thorns FC players and List of Portland Thorns FC players.

== Head coaches ==
Name	Nationality	From	To
Cindy Parlow Cone	United States	December 19, 2012	December 5, 2013
Paul Riley	England	December 10, 2013	December 31, 2015
Mark Parsons	England	January 1, 2016	November 14, 2021
Rhian Wilkinson	Canada	November 29, 2021	December 2, 2022
Mike Norris	England	January 9, 2023	April 16, 2024
Rob Gale	England	April 16, 2024	November 25, 2025
Robert Vilahamn	Sweden	March 4, 2026	present

== Records ==
=== Year-by-year ===
As of November 10th, 2024

Season	Regular season									Playoffs	Challenge Cup
Season	P	W	D	L	GF	GA	Pts	Position	Attendance (rank in league)	Playoffs	Challenge Cup
2013	22	11	5	6	32	28	38	3rd	13,320 (1st)	Champions	N/A
2014	24	10	6	8	39	35	36	3rd	13,362 (1st)	Semi-finals	N/A
2015	20	6	5	9	27	29	23	6th	15,639 (1st)	DNQ	N/A
2016	20	12	5	3	35	19	41	1st	16,945 (1st)	Semi-finals	N/A
2017	24	14	5	5	37	20	47	2nd	17,653 (1st)	Champions	N/A
2018	24	12	6	6	40	28	42	2nd	16,959 (1st)	Runners-up	N/A
2019	24	11	7	6	40	31	40	3rd	20,098 (1st)	Semi-finals	N/A
2020	4	3	1	0	10	7	10	Community Shield	N/A (COVID-19)	N/A	Semi-finals
2021	24	13	5	6	33	17	44	1st	14,391 (1st)	Semi-finals	Champions
2022	22	10	9	3	49	24	39	2nd	15,543 (2nd)	Champions	2nd in West Division
2023	22	10	5	7	42	32	35	2nd	18,918 (3rd)	Semi-finals	3rd in West Division
2024	26	10	4	12	37	35	34	6th	18,725 (3rd)	Quarter-final	DNQ
2025	26	11	7	8	36	29	40	3rd	18,173 (1st)	Semi-finals	DNQ

=== Career statistical leaders ===
As of match played October 29, 2022.

Bold indicates the player is rostered by the Thorns as of the 2026 season.

Total appearances per player, by competition
#	Pos.	Nat.	Name	Career	NWSL	Playoffs	Cup	Other	Total
1	FW	(Canada)	Christine Sinclair	2013–2024	140	11	14	4	169
2	DF	(United States)	Emily Menges	2014–2023	141	7	7	4	159
3	DF	(United States)	Meghan Klingenberg	2016–2024	84	8	16	3	111
4	MF	(United States)	Allie Long	2013–2017	100	5	0	0	105
5	MF	(United States)	Lindsey Horan	2016–2023	75	5	7	4	91
6	MF	(Costa Rica)	Raquel Rodríguez	2020–2023	61	3	15	4	83
7	MF	(United States)	Mana Shim	2013–2017	76	3	0	0	79
8	DF	(United States)	Kelli Hubly	2017–2024	56	2	16	4	78
9	MF	(United States)	Celeste Boureille	2016–2021	56	2	8	0	66
10	MF	(United States)	Tobin Heath	2013–2019	57	8	0	0	65

Total goals scored per player, by competition
#	Pos.	Nat.	Name	Career	NWSL	Playoffs	Cup	Other	Total
1	FW	(Canada)	Christine Sinclair	2013–2024	59	3	3	6	71
2	MF	(United States)	Lindsey Horan	2016–2023	25	3	2	1	31
3	MF	(United States)	Allie Long	2013–2017	30	0	—	—	30
4	FW	(United States)	**Sophia Wilson**	2020–	21	1	3	1	26
5	MF	(United States)	Tobin Heath	2013–2020	12	3	—	—	15
5	FW	(United States)	Alex Morgan	2013–2015	15	0	—	—	15
5	FW	(Denmark)	Nadia Nadim	2016–2017	15	0	—	—	15
8	FW	(Australia)	Hayley Raso	2016–2019	12	1	—	—	13
9	FW	(United States)	Jessica McDonald	2014-2014	11	0	—	—	11
9	FW	(United States)	**Morgan Weaver**	2020–	8	0	3	0	11

Total assists credited per player, by competition
#	Pos.	Nat.	Name	Career	NWSL	Playoffs	Cup	Other	Total
1	MF	(United States)	Tobin Heath	2013–2020	24	1	—	—	25
2	DF	(United States)	Meghan Klingenberg	2016–2024	17	1	2	1	21
3	FW	(Canada)	Christine Sinclair	2013–2024	15	1	0	0	16
4	MF	(United States)	Lindsey Horan	2016–2023	9	2	0	3	14
5	MF	(United States)	Allie Long	2013–2017	13	0	—	—	13
6	FW	(United States)	Alex Morgan	2013–2015	11	1	—	—	12
7	MF	(United States)	Mana Shim	2013–2017	9	0	—	—	9
8	FW	(Denmark)	Nadia Nadim	2016–2017	6	1	—	—	7
8	FW	(Australia)	Hayley Raso	2016–2019	7	0	—	—	7
8	FW	(United States)	**Morgan Weaver**	2020–	6	0	1	—	7

== NWSL award winners ==
Most Valuable Player

- Lindsey (Horan) Heaps: 2018
- Sophia (Smith) Wilson: 2022

Goalkeeper of the Year

- Michelle Betos: 2015
- Adrianna Franch: 2017, 2018

Golden Boot

- Sophia (Smith) Wilson: 2023

Coach of the Year

- Mark Parsons: 2016

Best XI First Team

- Verónica Boquete: 2014
- Michelle Betos: 2015
- Allie Long: 2015, 2016
- Emily Menges: 2016
- Adrianna Franch: 2017, 2018
- Emily Sonnett: 2018
- Tobin Heath: 2016, 2018, 2019
- Lindsey (Horan) Heaps: 2018, 2019
- Angela Salem: 2021
- Sam Coffey: 2022, 2023, 2025
- Sophia (Smith) Wilson: 2022, 2023, 2024
- Olivia Moultrie: 2025

Best XI Second Team

- Rachel Buehler: 2013
- Steph Catley: 2013
- Allie Long: 2013
- Jessica McDonald: 2013
- Alex Morgan: 2013
- Christine Sinclair: 2013, 2018
- Bella Bixby: 2019
- Emily Sonnett: 2019
- Lindsey (Horan) Heaps: 2017, 2021
- Meghan Klingenberg: 2017, 2021
- Emily Menges: 2017, 2018, 2021
- Kelli Hubly: 2022
- Becky Sauerbrunn: 2022

Lauren Holiday Impact Award

- Sam Hiatt, 2025

== Honors ==
- NWSL Championship
  - Winners (3): 2013, 2017, 2022
- NWSL Shield
  - Winners (2): 2016, 2021
- NWSL Challenge Cup
  - Winners (1): 2021
- NWSL Community Shield
  - Winners (1): 2020
- Women's International Champions Cup
  - Winners (1): 2021

== See also ==
- List of top-division football clubs in CONCACAF countries
- List of professional sports teams in the United States and Canada
- Women's sports in Portland, Oregon
