= Nina Nijstad =

Dutch footballer (born 2003)

- Nijstad with the Portland Thorns in 2026

Personal information
- Full name: Nina Iyobosa Nekpen Nijstad
- Date of birth: 5 March 2003 (age 23)
- Place of birth: Leeuwarden, Netherlands
- Height: 1.74 m (5 ft 9 in)
- Position: Midfielder

Team information
- Current team: Portland Thorns
- Number: 20

Youth career
- 2011–2018: LAC Frisia 1883
- 2018–2021: Heerenveen

Senior career*
Years	Team	Apps	(Gls)
2021–2023	Heerenveen	48	(3)
2023–2026	PSV	65	(11)
2026–	Portland Thorns	14	(1)

International career^{‡}
2022	Netherlands U19	3	(0)
2022	Netherlands U20	6	(0)
2022–	Netherlands U23	21	(3)
2024–	Netherlands	4	(2)
- * Club domestic league appearances and goals as of 18:01, 11 November 2026 (UTC) ‡ National team caps and goals as of 12 October 2026

Nina Iyobosa Nekpen Nijstad (Dutch: [ˈni.naː ˈnɛi̯.stɑt], Edo: [ijɔ̀bɔ̀sà nɛ̀kpẽ̀]; born 5 March 2003) is a Dutch professional footballer who plays as a midfielder for Portland Thorns FC of the National Women's Soccer League (NWSL) and the Netherlands national team.

== Club career ==
Nijstad started her youth career with LAC Frisia 1883, before joining Heerenveen in 2018. She made her professional debut for Heerenveen on 12 March 2021 in a 2–6 defeat to Twente.

On 21 March 2023, PSV announced that Nijstad will join the club on 1 July 2023. In April 2024, she extended her contract with the club until June 2028.

On 7 July 2026, Nijstad joined National Women's Soccer League (NWSL) Portland Thorns, signing a four-year contract through 2029.

== International career ==
Formerly a Netherlands youth international, Nijstad represented the nation from under-19 level. She was part of the Dutch squad which finished fourth at the 2022 FIFA U-20 Women's World Cup.

In March 2024, Nijstad received her first call-up to the Netherlands national team. She made her international debut on 25 October 2024 by scoring two goals in a record breaking 15–0 win against Indonesia.

== Personal life ==
Nijstad was born in the Netherlands to a Nigerian father and a Dutch mother. She is a fan of Real Madrid.

== Career statistics ==
=== International ===
As of match played 2 December 2025

Appearances and goals by national team and year
National team	Year	Apps	Goals
Netherlands	2024	2	2
Netherlands	2025	2	0
Netherlands	2026	0	0
Total		4	2

Scores and results list Netherlands' goal tally first, score column indicates score after each Nijstad goal.

List of international goals scored by Nina Nijstad
No.	Date	Venue	Opponent	Score	Result	Competition
1	25 October 2024	De Vijverberg, Doetinchem, Netherlands	Indonesia	10–0	15–0	Friendly
2	25 October 2024	De Vijverberg, Doetinchem, Netherlands	Indonesia	12–0	15–0	Friendly

== Honours ==
PSV

- Vrouwen Eredivisie: 2025–26
- Eredivisie Cup: 2024–25, 2025–26

Individual

- Eredivisie Cup top goalscorer: 2025–26
