= Renee Lyles =

American soccer player (born 2002)

- Lyles with the Portland Thorns in 2026

Personal information
- Full name: Renee Grace Lyles
- Date of birth: October 30, 2002 (age 24)
- Height: 5 ft 5 in (1.65 m)
- Position: Midfielder

Team information
- Current team: Portland Thorns
- Number: 41

Youth career
- Concorde Fire

College career
Years	Team	Apps	(Gls)
2021–2025	Clemson Tigers	81	(21)

Senior career*
Years	Team	Apps	(Gls)
2026–	Portland Thorns	12	(2)
- * Club domestic league appearances and goals as of 17:59, November 11, 2026 (UTC)

Renee Grace Lyles (born October 30, 2002) is an American professional soccer player who plays as a midfielder for Portland Thorns FC of the National Women's Soccer League (NWSL). She played college soccer for the Clemson Tigers.

== Early life ==
Lyles grew up in Atlanta, Georgia, where she attended St. Pius X Catholic High School. She played club soccer for Concorde Fire. As a member of the school's soccer team, she helped St. Pius X win the Georgia Class 4A state championship in 2019. In 2021, she was named the Georgia Class 5A Player of the Year.

== College career ==
Lyles played college soccer for the Clemson Tigers from 2021 to 2025. As a freshman in 2021, she started 19 matches, scoring seven goals and recording five assists. She was named to the ACC All-Freshman Team and the All-ACC Academic Team. In 2022, she appeared in 17 matches, making 16 starts, and scored four goals while earning a second consecutive All-ACC Academic Team selection.

In 2023, Lyles appeared in 21 matches, including 16 starts, scoring six goals and adding five assists. She was named to the All-ACC Academic Team for a third consecutive season and was selected as ACC Player of the Week on October 24, 2023. She helped Clemson reach the semifinals of the NCAA Division I women's soccer tournament and was named to the NCAA College Cup All-Tournament Team. Lyles suffered a torn medial collateral ligament (MCL) during preseason training ahead of the 2024 season, causing her to miss the entire campaign. She returned in 2025, starting all 19 matches while scoring four goals and recording five assists. Lyles finished her collegiate career with 81 appearances and 21 goals.

== Club career ==
Lyles joined the Portland Thorns ahead of the 2026 National Women's Soccer League preseason as a non-roster invitee. On March 12, 2026, after scoring four goals during the preseason, she signed her first professional contract, a short-term deal through May 31, 2026. On June 9, 2026, she signed a contract extension to remain with the Thorns through the end of the 2026 season. Lyles scored her first professional goal on July 24, 2026, in the 21st minute of a draw against Gotham FC.
