= Jayden Perry =

American soccer player (born 2001)

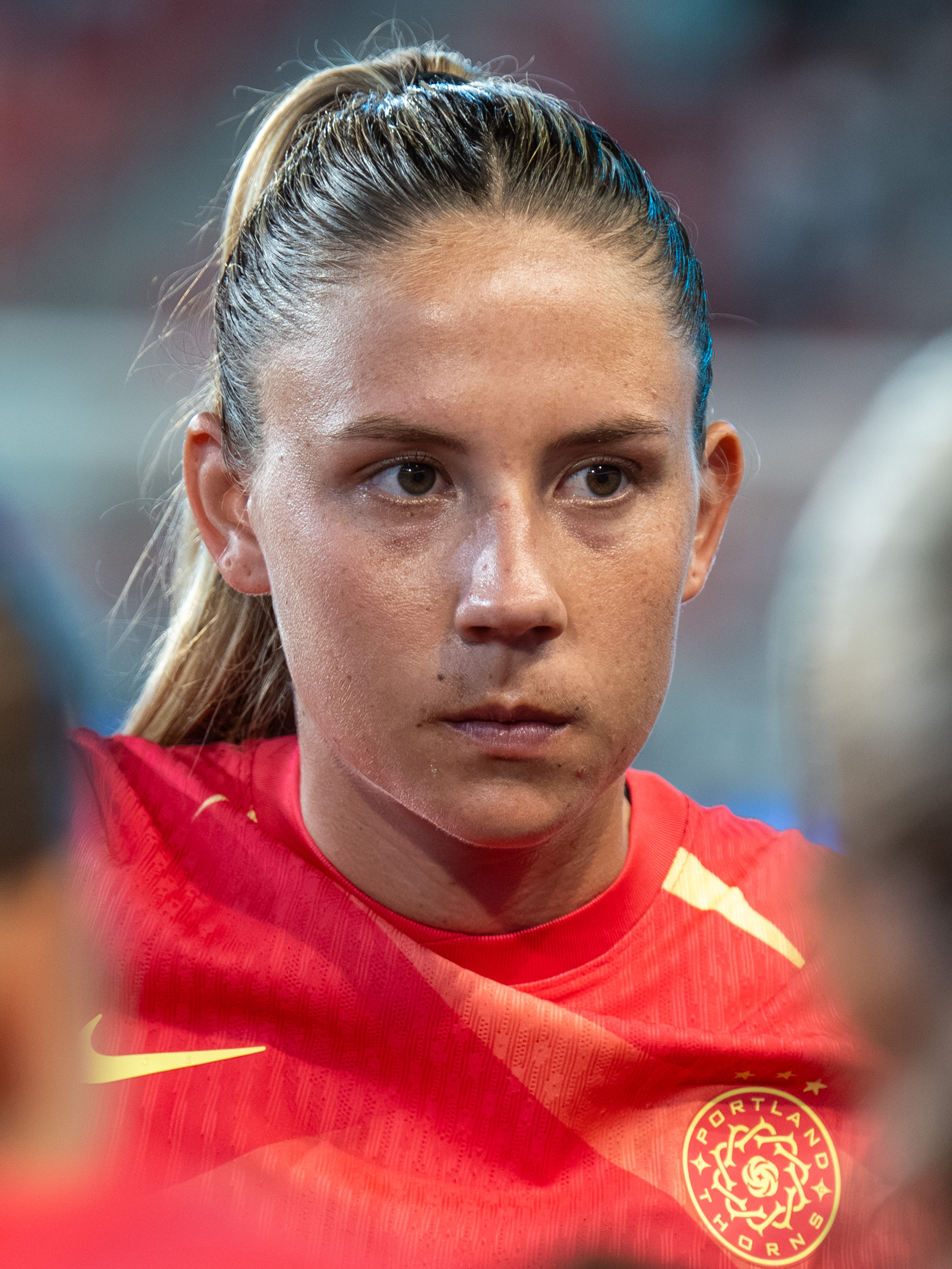
- Perry with the Portland Thorns in 2025

Personal information
- Full name: Jayden Lee Perry
- Date of birth: March 31, 2003 (age 23)
- Place of birth: Laguna Hills, California, U.S.
- Height: 5 ft 9 in (1.75 m)
- Position: Center back

Team information
- Current team: Portland Thorns
- Number: 24

College career
Years	Team	Apps	(Gls)
2021–2024	UCLA Bruins	82	(7)

Senior career*
Years	Team	Apps	(Gls)
2025–	Portland Thorns	42	(4)

International career^{‡}
2025–	United States U23	3	(0)
- * Club domestic league appearances and goals as of 18:01, November 11, 2026 (UTC) ‡ National team caps and goals as of December 2, 2025

Jayden Lee Perry (born March 31, 2003) is an American professional soccer player who plays as a center back for Portland Thorns FC of the National Women's Soccer League (NWSL). She played college soccer for the UCLA Bruins, winning the 2022 national championship.

== Early life ==
Perry was born in Laguna Hills, California, to Jana and Jason Perry, and has two younger siblings. She was raised in Rancho Santa Margarita and attended Trabuco Hills High School, where she captained the soccer team and earned all-state honors. She played club soccer for Slammers FC, winning the ECNL under-15 national championship in 2018. She committed to UCLA before her sophomore year.

== College career ==
Perry played in 17 games, two of them as a starter, in her freshman season with the UCLA Bruins in 2021, winning the Pac-12 Conference regular-season championship. She established herself in the lineup as a sophomore in 2022, starting all but one of her 24 appearances. She played every minute of the NCAA tournament after the first round, featuring alongside Lilly Reale and Quincy McMahon on the back line, as UCLA won their second national championship. In the title game, UCLA came back from a two-goal deficit to defeat North Carolina 3–2 in overtime.

Perry started all 19 games in her junior season in 2023, earning second-team All-Pac-12 honors as she won her second conference championship. She started 22 games in her senior season in 2024, with the program moving to the Big Ten Conference. UCLA won its new conference tournament without conceding in three tournament games. Perry also helped UCLA lead the nation with 16 clean sheets and earned second-team All-Big Ten honors. She scored seven goals in her college career, all of them penalties.

== Club career ==
Portland Thorns FC announced on January 22, 2025, that the club had signed Perry to her first professional contract on a one-year deal. She made her professional debut on March 15, starting and playing the full 90 minutes in the season opener, a 3–1 defeat to the Kansas City Current. On April 23, she scored her first professional goal, converting from the penalty spot, as the Thorns won 4–1 at home against Gotham FC. She was the fastest NWSL rookie to score a penalty (fourth appearance). Four days later, she made her first professional assist against Racing Louisville, setting up a header for Reilyn Turner from near midfield, and earned NWSL Assist of the Week for the effort. In late stoppage time, she converted her second penalty in two games to salvage a 3–3 draw with Louisville. Another stoppage-time penalty saved a 1–1 draw against the San Diego Wave on May 10.

On May 15, the Thorns signed Perry to a contract extension through 2028. Later in the month, she settled for third place at the inaugural CONCACAF W Champions Cup after losing 2–0 to Tigres in the semifinals. She finished her rookie campaign with 18 regular-season appearances, starting 14, and scored 3 penalty goals as she played over 1,300 minutes.

== International career ==
Perry was called into training with the United States under-23 team in June 2025 at a camp held concurrently with the senior national team.

== Honors and awards ==
UCLA Bruins

- NCAA Division I tournament: 2022
- Pac-12 Conference: 2021, 2023
- Big Ten tournament: 2024

Individual

- Second-team All-Pac-12: 2023
- Second-team All-Big Ten: 2024
