= Cassandra Bogere =

Swedish footballer (born 2005)

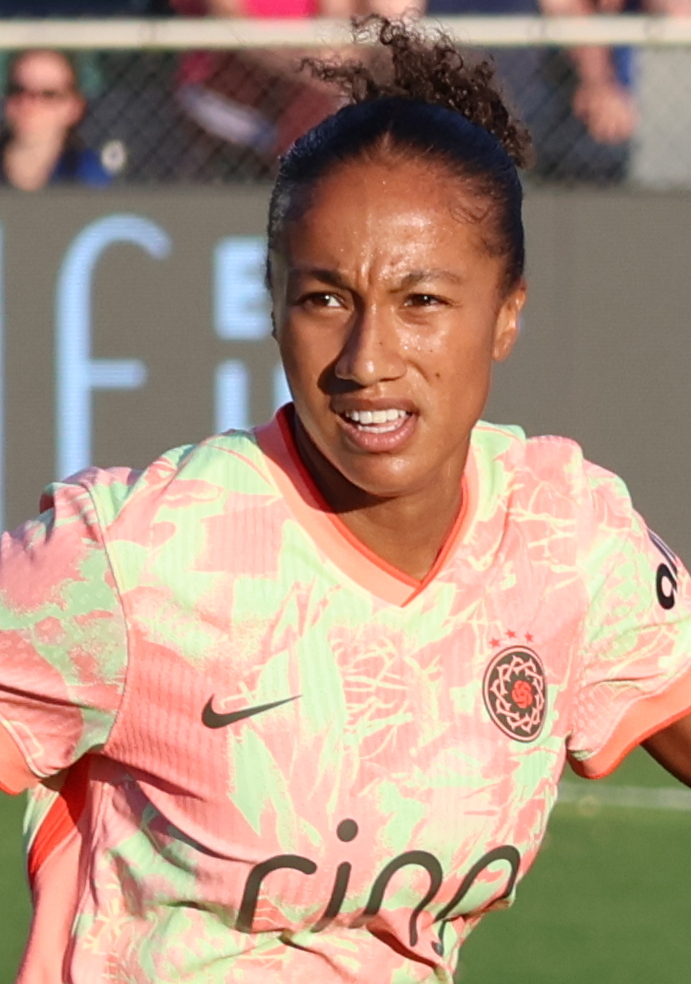
- Bogere with the Portland Thorns in 2026

Personal information
- Full name: Cassandra Ella Archontoulis Bogere
- Date of birth: 25 June 2005 (age 21)
- Place of birth: Gothenburg, Sweden
- Position: Midfielder

Team information
- Current team: Portland Thorns
- Number: 6

Youth career
- 2010-2013: Azalea BK
- 2014-2019: Grüner
- 2019: Nordstrand
- 2019–2021: Skeid
- 2022: Røa

Senior career*
Years	Team	Apps	(Gls)
2022–2024	Røa	49	(0)
2024	→ Brann (loan)	6	(0)
2025	Brann	22	(2)
2026–	Portland Thorns	22	(0)

International career^{‡}
2022	Norway U18	3	(0)
2023–2024	Norway U19	9	(0)
- * Club domestic league appearances and goals as of 17:56, 11 November 2026 (UTC) ‡ National team caps and goals as of 29 January 2026

Cassandra Ella Archontoulis Bogere (born 25 June 2005) is a Swedish professional footballer who plays as a midfielder for National Women's Soccer League club Portland Thorns. A former Norway youth international, she committed to play for the Sweden national team.

== Early life ==
Bogere was born in Gothenburg, Sweden to a Swedish/Greek mother. Cassandra was raised in Oslo, Norway, by her mother where she also became a citizen in her teenage years. She is also of Ugandan descent.

== Club career ==
Bogere joined Røa's academy from Skeid in January 2022. In June 2024, she joined Brann on loan with the intention for permanent transfer at the end of the season. In November 2024, she signed a three-year contract with Brann. The following season, she contributed to the club's league triumph.

In January 2026, Bogere joined the National Women's Soccer League (NWSL)'s Portland Thorns for an undisclosed fee, signing a three-year contract with a club option for another year. She made her debut in the season opener on March 13, starting in a 1–0 win over the Washington Spirit. The following match, she was sent off in the 9th minute of Portland's rivalry match against the Seattle Reign after committing two bookable offences in quick succession, setting the record for the fastest double yellow in NWSL history.

== International career ==
Due to her dual citizenship, Bogere was eligible to play for the national teams of Sweden and Norway. She has represented the latter at youth levels. On 19 May 2026 Bogere's switch to Sweden was approved by FIFA.

== Honors ==
Brann

- Toppserien: 2025
