= 2018–19 Olympique Lyonnais Féminin season =

Olympique Lyonnais Féminin
2018–19 season
- Manager: Reynald Pedros
- Stadium: Groupama OL Training Center
- Division 1: Champions
- Coupe de France: Champions
- UEFA Champions League: Champions
- Top goalscorer: League: Ada Hegerberg (20); All: Ada Hegerberg (29)
Home colours	Away colours

The 2018–19 Olympique Lyonnais Féminin season was the club's fifteenth season since FC Lyon joined OL as its women's section. Olympique Lyonnais retained their Division 1 Féminine and UEFA Women's Champions League titles, and won the Coupe de France Féminine for the seventh time in eight season having been Runners Up to Paris Saint-Germain the previous season.

== Season events ==
On 2 July, Olympique Lyonnais signed Lisa Weiß from SGS Essen and Carolin Simon from SC Freiburg, both to two-year contracts.

On 23 July, Olympique Lyonnais announced the signing of Izzy Christiansen from Manchester City.

On 24 September, Jess Fishlock joined Olympique Lyonnais on loan until the end of Olympique Lyonnais' participation in the UEFA Women's Champions League.

On 11 January, Olympique Lyonnais announced the signing of Sole Jaimes from Dalian.

== Squad ==
As of match played 18 May 2019

No.	Name	Nationality	Position	Date of birth (age)	Signed from	Signed in	Contract ends	Apps.	Goals
Goalkeepers
1	Lisa Weiß	(Germany)	GK	29 October 1987 (aged 31)	SGS Essen	2018	2020	10	0
16	Sarah Bouhaddi	(France)	GK	17 October 1986 (aged 32)	Juvisy	2009		256	1
30	Audrey Dupupet	(France)	GK	3 January 2001 (aged 18)	Academy	2017		0	0
Defenders
2	Lucy Bronze	(England)	DF	28 October 1991 (aged 27)	Manchester City	2017	2020	60	6
3	Wendie Renard	(France)	DF	20 July 1990 (aged 28)	Academy	2006		344	102
4	Selma Bacha	(France)	DF	9 November 2000 (aged 18)	Academy	2017		47	3
21	Kadeisha Buchanan	(Canada)	DF	5 November 1995 (aged 23)	West Virginia Mountaineers	2017		55	1
26	Carolin Simon	(Germany)	DF	24 November 1992 (aged 26)	SC Freiburg	2018	2020	14	0
29	Griedge Mbock Bathy	(France)	DF	26 February 1995 (aged 24)	Guingamp	2015		114	21
Midfielders
5	Saki Kumagai	(Japan)	MF	17 October 1990 (aged 28)	1. FFC Frankfurt	2013		190	35
6	Amandine Henry	(France)	MF	28 September 1989 (aged 29)	Portland Thorns	2018	2021	255	52
7	Amel Majri	(France)	MF	25 January 1993 (aged 26)	Academy	2010		193	57
8	Izzy Christiansen	(England)	MF	20 September 1991 (aged 27)	Manchester City	2018		18	4
10	Dzsenifer Marozsán	(Germany)	MF	18 April 1992 (aged 27)	1. FFC Frankfurt	2016		90	33
18	Eva Kouache	(France)	MF	7 January 2000 (aged 19)	Academy	2018		5	0
19	Lorena Azzaro	(France)	MF	22 October 2000 (aged 18)	Academy	2018		1	0
24	Jess Fishlock	(Wales)	MF	14 January 1987 (aged 32)	on loan from OL Reign	2018	2019	26	2
	Yasmine Klai	(France)	MF	15 September 2002 (aged 16)	Academy	2017		0	0
	Iris Rabot	(France)	MF	16 October 2000 (aged 18)	Academy	2017		0	0
Forwards
9	Eugénie Le Sommer	(France)	FW	18 May 1989 (aged 30)	Stade Briochin	2010		290	257
11	Shanice van de Sanden	(Netherlands)	FW	2 October 1992 (aged 26)	Liverpool	2017	2020	55	10
14	Ada Hegerberg	(Norway)	FW	10 July 1995 (aged 23)	Turbine Potsdam	2014		166	197
20	Delphine Cascarino	(France)	FW	5 February 1997 (aged 22)	Academy	2015		92	23
25	Sole Jaimes	(Argentina)	FW	20 January 1989 (aged 30)	Dalian Quanjian	2019		7	1
27	Emelyne Laurent	(France)	FW	4 November 1998 (aged 20)	Bordeaux	2017		18	4
28	Melvine Malard	(France)	FW	28 June 2000 (aged 18)	Academy	2017		5	0
	Cyrine Ben Rabah	(France)	FW	27 November 2002 (aged 16)	Academy	2017		0	0
	Jessy Danielle Roux	(France)	FW	30 March 2000 (aged 19)	Academy	2017		0	0
Out on loan
Left during the season

== Transfers ==
=== In ===
Date	Position	Nationality	Name	From	Fee	Ref.
2 July 2018	GK	(Germany)	Lisa Weiß	SGS Essen	Undisclosed	
2 July 2018	DF	(Germany)	Carolin Simon	SC Freiburg	Undisclosed	
23 July 2018	MF	(England)	Izzy Christiansen	Manchester City	Undisclosed	
11 January 2019	FW	(Argentina)	Sole Jaimes	Dalian Quanjian	Undisclosed	

=== Loans in ===
Start date	Position	Nationality	Name	From	End date	Ref.
24 September 2018	MF	(Wales)	Jess Fishlock	OL Reign	19 May 2019	

=== Loans out ===
Start date	Position	Nationality	Name	To	End date	Ref.
24 January 2019	FW	(France)	Emelyne Laurent	Guingamp	End of season	

=== Released ===
Date	Position	Nationality	Name	Joined	Date	Ref.
30 June 2019	GK	(France)	Audrey Dupupet	Reims		
30 June 2019	FW	(Argentina)	Sole Jaimes	Santos	11 July 2019	
30 June 2019	FW	(France)	Jessy Danielle Roux	Reims		

== Friendlies ==
=== International Champions Cup ===
27 July 2018 Semifinal	Olympique Lyonnais (France)	3–0	(England) Manchester City	Miami Gardens, United States
03:00 CEST (UTC+2)	Le Sommer 4', 14'; Hegerberg 17'	Report		Stadium: Hard Rock Stadium; Referee: Jasmine Peralta (United States)

30 July 2018 Final	North Carolina Courage (United States)	1–0	(France) Olympique Lyonnais	Miami Gardens, United States
03:00 CEST (UTC+2)	O'Reilly 10'; Roccaro (yellow card) 69'; Jenkins (yellow card) 89'	Report	Buchanan (yellow card) 81'	Stadium: Hard Rock Stadium; Referee: Jasmine Peralta (United States)

== Competitions ==
=== Overview ===
Competition	First match	Last match	Starting round	Final position	Record							
Competition	First match	Last match	Starting round	Final position	Pld	W	D	L	GF	GA	GD	Win %
Division 1	25 August 2018	4 May 2019	Matchday 1	Winners	22	20	2	0	89	6	+83	90.91
Coupe de France	6 January 2019	8 May 2019	Round of 32	Winners	5	5	0	0	16	1	+15	100.00
UEFA Champions League	12 September 2018	18 May 2019	Round of 32	Winners	9	8	1	0	33	6	+27	88.89
Total					36	33	3	0	138	13	+125	91.67

Last updated: 18 May 2019
Source: Competitions

=== Division 1 ===
==== Results summary ====
Overall								Home						Away					
Pld	W	D	L	GF	GA	GD	Pts	W	D	L	GF	GA	GD	W	D	L	GF	GA	GD
22	20	2	0	89	6	+83	62	11	0	0	43	2	+41	9	2	0	46	4	+42

Last updated: 4 May 2019.

==== Results by matchday ====
Matchday	1	2	3	4	5	6	7	8	9	10	11	12	13	14	15	16	17	18	19	20	21	22
Ground	A	H	A	H	A	H	H	A	H	A	H	H	A	A	H	H	A	A	A	H	A	H
Result	W	W	W	W	W	W	W	W	W	D	W	W	W	W	W	W	W	W	D	W	W	W
Position	1	1	1	1	1	1	1	1	1	1	1	1	1	1	1	1	1	1	1	1	1	1

Updated to match(es) played on 4 May 2019. Source: Results
A = Away; H = Home; W = Win; D = Draw; L = Loss; P = Postponed

==== Results ====
26 August 2018 1	Lille OSC	0–8	Olympique Lyonnais	Camphin-en-Pévèle
14:45 CEST (UTC+2)	Demeyere (yellow card) 24'	Report	Hegerberg 5', 46'; Majri 12', 90+1' van de Sanden 33'; Christiansen 64'; Henry 72'; Bronze 87'	Stadium: Complexe Sportif de Luchin; Referee: Elodie Coppola

8 September 2018 2	Olympique Lyonnais	4–0	Soyaux	Décines-Charpieu
14:30 CEST (UTC+2)	Hegerberg 5'; Majri 33', 57'; Mbock 85'	Report		Stadium: Stade Gérard Houllier; Referee: Victoria Beyer

16 September 2018 3	Guingamp	0–3	Olympique Lyonnais	Pabu
15:00 CEST (UTC+2)	Hoarau (yellow card) 47'; Le Moing (yellow card) 77'	Report	Le Sommer 67', 71', 86'; Christiansen (yellow card) 83'	Stadium: Stade Centre Formation EAG 1 Referee: Maika Vanderstichel

22 September 2018 4	Olympique Lyonnais	5–0	Paris FC	Décines-Charpieu
14:30 CEST (UTC+2)	Hegerberg 11', 36', 58'; Renard 20'; Henry 34'; Majri (yellow card) 72'	Report	E.Cascarino (yellow card) 57'; Bourdieu (yellow card) 68'	Stadium: Stade Gérard Houllier; Referee: Florence Guillemin

30 September 2018 5	Rodez	0–2	Olympique Lyonnais	Rodez
15:00 CEST (UTC+2)		Report	Kumagai 39'; Cascarino 51'	Stadium: Stade Paul-Lignon; Referee: Helene Burban

14 October 2018 6	Olympique Lyonnais	2–1	Montpellier	Décines-Charpieu
15:00 CEST (UTC+2)	Le Sommer 44'; Fishlock 52'	Report	Mondésir (yellow card) 19'; Dekker (yellow card) 24'; Gauvin 72'	Stadium: Stade Gérard Houllier; Referee: Victoria Beyer

21 October 2018 7	Olympique Lyonnais	3–0	Girondins Bordeaux	Décines-Charpieu
15:00 CEST (UTC+2)	Majri 8', 30'; Hegerberg 80'	Report	Lavogez (yellow card) 52'; Istillart (yellow card) 71'; Thibaud (yellow card) 84'	Stadium: Stade Gérard Houllier; Referee: Elodie Coppola

27 October 2018 8	Metz	0–5	Olympique Lyonnais	Longeville-lès-Metz
14:30 CEST (UTC+2)	Kaya (yellow card) 79'	Report	Hegerberg 7', 55'; Laurent 9'; Kumagai (yellow card) 21'; Cascarino 62'; Majri 80'	Stadium: Stade Saint-Symphorien; Referee: Camille Soriano

3 November 2018 9	Olympique Lyonnais	5–0	Dijon FCO	Décines-Charpieu
14:30 CET (UTC+1)	Henry 26', 77'; Marozsán 38'; Mbock (yellow card) 60'; Renard 75', 90+2' (pen.)	Report	Carage (yellow card) 52'	Stadium: Stade Gérard Houllier; Referee: Aurelie Efe

18 November 2018 10	Paris Saint-Germain	1–1	Olympique Lyonnais	Paris
21:00 CEST (UTC+2)	Wang 15' (yellow card) 90'	Report	Renard 15'; Bacha (yellow card) 60'	Stadium: Stade Jean-Bouin; Referee: Maika Vanderstichel

24 November 2018 11	Olympique Lyonnais	4–1	Fleury 91	Décines-Charpieu
21:00 CET (UTC+1)	Le Sommer 5'; Marozsán 42'; Hegerberg 66'; Christiansen 84'	Report	Chatelain (yellow card) 5'; Sissoko (yellow card) 69'	Stadium: Stade Gérard Houllier; Referee: Helene Burban

2 December 2018 12	Olympique Lyonnais	7–0	Guingamp	Décines-Charpieu
14:45 CET (UTC+1)	Robert 39' (o.g.); Hegerberg 43', 48' van de Sanden 52'; Marozsán 62', 74'; Le Sommer 90+1'	Report		Stadium: Stade Gérard Houllier; Referee: Jennifer Maubacq

8 December 2018 13	Soyaux	0–6	Olympique Lyonnais	Angoulême
14:00 CET (UTC+1)	Boudaud (yellow card) 27'	Report	van de Sanden 10'; Majri 21'; Marozsán 30' (pen.); Hegerberg 65', 78'; Le Sommer 68'	Stadium: Stade Camille Lebon; Referee: Aurelie Efe

16 December 2018 14	Montpellier	0–5	Olympique Lyonnais	Montpellier
13:00 CET (UTC+1)	Dekker (yellow card) 64'; Toletti 66'	Report	Le Sommer 38'; Torrent 39' (o.g.); Renard 55' (pen.); Marozsán 86'	Stadium: Stade Bernard Gasset; Referee: Stephanie di Benedetto

12 January 2019 15	Olympique Lyonnais	4–0	Rodez	Décines-Charpieu
21:00 CET (UTC+1)	Le Sommer 16', 32'; Renard 22'; Marozsán 34'; Buchanan (yellow card) 90+1'	Report		Stadium: Stade Gérard Houllier; Referee: Maika Vanderstichel

16 February 2019 17	Olympique Lyonnais	1–0	Lille OSC	Décines-Charpieu
14:30 CET (UTC+1)	Marozsán 12'	Report		Stadium: Stade Gérard Houllier; Referee: Maika Vanderstichel

20 February 2019 16	Paris FC	1–4	Olympique Lyonnais	Paris
18:30 CET (UTC+1)	Thiney 44' (pen.)	Report	Cascarino 2'; Hegerberg 33'; Abam 62' (o.g.); Majri 88'	Stadium: Stade Sébastien Charléty; Referee: Aurelie Efe

16 March 2019 18	Girondins Bordeaux	1–7	Olympique Lyonnais	Le Bouscat
14:30 CET (UTC+1)	Asseyi 30'; Kathellen (yellow card) 61'	Report	van de Sanden 14', 73' (yellow card) 81'; Marozsán 21'; Hegerberg 27', 84'; Le Sommer 48'; Buchanan 63'; Bacha (yellow card) 77'	Stadium: Stade Sainte Germaine; Referee: Stephanie di Benedetto

31 March 2019 19	Fleury 91	1–1	Olympique Lyonnais	Fleury-Mérogis
14:45 CEST (UTC+2)	Corboz 73'	Report	Jaimes 39'; Kumagai (yellow card) 88'	Stadium: Stade Auguste Gentelet; Referee: Aurelie Efe

13 April 2019 20	Olympique Lyonnais	5–0	Paris Saint-Germain	Décines-Charpieu
20:45 CET (UTC+1)	Hegerberg 8'; Le Sommer 40'; Renard 45' (pen.); Marozsán 60' van de Sanden 90+2'	Report	Diani (yellow card) 53'; Lawrence (yellow card) 56'	Stadium: Groupama OL Training Center; Referee: Victoria Beyer

24 April 2019 21	Dijon FCO	0–4	Olympique Lyonnais	Dijon
18:30 CEST (UTC+2)	Nakkach (yellow card) 57'	Report	Majri 48'; Le Sommer 62'; Mbock 65' van de Sanden 86'	Stadium: Stade Gaston Gérard; Referee: Jennifer Maubacq

4 May 2019 22	Olympique Lyonnais	3–0	Metz	Décines-Charpieu
14:30 CET (UTC+1)	Renard 23'; Kumagai 45' (pen.); Buchanan (yellow card) 58'; Hegerberg 81'	Report		Stadium: Stade Gérard Houllier; Referee: Alexandra Collin

==== Table ====
Pos	Team	Pld	W	D	L	GF	GA	GD	Pts	Qualification or relegation
1	Lyon (C)	22	20	2	0	89	6	+83	62	Qualification for the Champions League round of 32
2	Paris Saint-Germain	22	18	3	1	62	16	+46	57	Qualification for the Champions League round of 32
3	Montpellier	22	12	3	7	51	27	+24	39	
4	Bordeaux	22	10	4	8	26	34	−8	34	
5	Paris FC	22	9	5	8	34	28	+6	32	
6	Soyaux	22	7	6	9	19	37	−18	27	
7	Guingamp	22	6	6	10	24	33	−9	24	
8	Dijon	22	7	3	12	29	44	−15	24	
9	Fleury	22	5	7	10	24	34	−10	22	
10	Metz	22	6	1	15	21	63	−42	19	
11	Lille (R)	22	4	6	12	20	43	−23	18	Relegation to Division 2 Féminine
12	Rodez (R)	22	3	4	15	14	48	−34	13	Relegation to Division 2 Féminine

Source: Soccerway FFF
Rules for classification: 1) points; 2) head-to-head points; 3) head-to-head goal difference; 4) goal difference; 5) goals scored
(C) Champions; (R) Relegated

=== Coupe de France ===
6 January 2019 Round of 32	Rodez	0–6	Olympique Lyonnais	Rodez
15:00 CET (UTC+1)	Cazeau (yellow card) 23'; Guitard (yellow card) 25'		Bacha (yellow card) 17'; Christiansen 35'; Le Sommer 56', 83'; Renard 67'; Henry 75'; Majri 89'	Stadium: Stade Paul-Lignon; Attendance: 696; Referee: Camille Soriano

27 January 2019 Round of 16	Soyaux	0–5	Olympique Lyonnais	Angoulême
13:30 CET (UTC+1)	Cissoko (yellow card) 57'		Cascarino 17'; Mbock 20'; Hegerberg 36'; Marozsán 55', 80'	Stadium: Stade Camille Lebon; Attendance: 636; Referee: Elodie Coppola

10 February 2019 Quarterfinal	Olympique Lyonnais	1–0	Paris Saint-Germain	Décines-Charpieu
14:45 CET (UTC+1)	Le Sommer (yellow card) 16'; Fishlock 60'; Renard (yellow card) 68'; Bouhaddi (yellow card) 81'; Henry (yellow card) 82'		Wang (yellow card) 34'; Morroni (yellow card) 39'; Lawrence (yellow card) 78'	Stadium: Groupama OL Training Center; Attendance: 10,217; Referee: Florence Guillemin

10 March 2019 Semifinal	Grenoble Foot 38	0–1	Olympique Lyonnais	Grenoble
14:15 CET (UTC+1)			Hegerberg 90+4'	Stadium: Stade des Alpes; Attendance: 4,920; Referee: Solenne Bartnik

8 May 2019 Final	Olympique Lyonnais	3–1	Lille OSC	Châteauroux
18:00	Henry 52' van de Sanden 53'; Renard 83'		Sarr 68'; Dufour (yellow card) 73'	Stadium: Stade Gaston-Petit; Attendance: 9,518; Referee: Maika Vanderstichel

=== UEFA Champions League ===
12 September 2018 Round of 32 1st leg	Avaldsnes (Norway)	0–2	(France) Olympique Lyonnais	Haugesund, Norway
18:00 CEST (UTC+2)		Report	Henry 50'; Majri 77'	Stadium: Haugesund Stadion; Attendance: 2,319; Referee: Marta Frias Acedo (Spain)

27 September 2018 Round of 32 2nd leg	Olympique Lyonnais (France)	5–0 (7–0 agg.)	(Norway) Avaldsnes	Décines-Charpieu, France
18:30 CEST (UTC+2)	Majri 8'; Le Sommer 22', 31'; Hegerberg 55', 81'	Report	Utvik (yellow card) 72'	Stadium: Groupama Academy Stadium; Attendance: 1,214; Referee: Petra Pavlikova (Slovakia)

17 October 2018 Round of 16 1st leg	Ajax (Netherlands)	0–4	(France) Olympique Lyonnais	Duivendrecht, Netherlands
19:00 CEST (UTC+2)		Report	Majri 12'; Bacha 27'; Hegerberg 57'; Christiansen 89'	Stadium: Sportpark De Toekomst; Attendance: 1,783; Referee: Pernilla Larsson (Sweden)

31 October 2018 Round of 16 2nd leg	Olympique Lyonnais (France)	9–0 (13–0 agg.)	(Netherlands) Ajax	Décines-Charpieu, France
19:00 CET (UTC+1)	Cascarino 4', 8'; Renard 17', 22' (yellow card) 83'; Hegerberg 57'; Mbock Bathy 62', 89'; Majri 69'; Kumagai (yellow card) 77'; Bronze 90+3'	Report		Stadium: Groupama Academy Stadium; Attendance: 1,480; Referee: Katalin Kulcsár (Hungary)

20 March 2018 Quarterfinal 1st leg	Olympique Lyonnais (France)	2–1	(Germany) VfL Wolfsburg	Décines-Charpieu, France
20:45 CET (UTC+1)	Le Sommer 11' (yellow card) 75'; Renard 18' van de Sanden (yellow card) 63'; Marozsán (yellow card) 73'	Report	Fischer 64'; Peter (yellow card) 80'	Stadium: Parc Olympique Lyonnais; Attendance: 17,840; Referee: Kateryna Monzul (Ukraine)

27 March 2019 Quarterfinal 2nd leg	VfL Wolfsburg (Germany)	2–4 (3–6 agg.)	(France) Olympique Lyonnais	Wolfsburg, Germany
18:15 CEST (UTC+2)	Neto (yellow card) 11'; Harder 53', 56'; Gunnarsdóttir (yellow card) 83'	Report	Marozsán 8'; Bronze (yellow card) 21'; Renard 25' (pen.); Hegerberg (yellow card) 58'; Le Sommer 60', 80'	Stadium: AOK Stadion; Attendance: 4,445; Referee: Lina Lehtovaara (Finland)

21 April 2019 Semifinal 1st leg	Olympique Lyonnais (France)	2–1	(England) Chelsea	Décines-Charpieu, France
17:00 CEST (UTC+2)	Eriksson 27' (o.g.); Henry 39'	Report	Kirby (penalty missed) 45+1'; Cuthbert 72'	Stadium: Parc Olympique Lyonnais; Attendance: 22,911; Referee: Katalin Kulcsár (Hungary)

28 April 2019 Semifinal 2nd leg	Chelsea (England)	1–1 (2–3 agg.)	(France) Olympique Lyonnais	Kingston upon Thames, England
15:00 CEST (UTC+2)	Ji 34'; Bachmann (yellow card) 35'	Report	Le Sommer 17'; Henry (yellow card) 28'; Cascarino (yellow card) 32'; Bouhaddi (yellow card) 35'; Fishlock (yellow card) 64'; Renard (yellow card) 72'	Stadium: Kingsmeadow; Attendance: 4,670; Referee: Sara Persson (Sweden)

==== Final ====
18 May 2019 Final	Olympique Lyonnais (France)	4–1	(Spain) Barcelona	Budapest, Hungary
18:00 CEST (UTC+2)	Marozsán 5'; Hegerberg 14', 19', 30' (yellow card) 15'; Renard (yellow card) 25'	Report	Oshoala 89'	Stadium: Groupama Arena; Attendance: 19,487; Referee: Anastasia Pustovoitova (Russia)

== Squad statistics ==
As of match played 18 May 2019

=== Appearances ===
No.	Pos	Nat	Player	Total		Division 1		Coupe de France		UEFA Champions League	
No.	Pos	Nat	Player	Apps	Goals	Apps	Goals	Apps	Goals	Apps	Goals
1	GK	(Germany) GER	Lisa Weiß	10	0	4	0	4	0	2	0
2	DF	(England) ENG	Lucy Bronze	29	2	15+1	1	4	0	9	1
3	DF	(France) FRA	Wendie Renard	30	14	17	8	4	2	9	4
4	DF	(France) FRA	Selma Bacha	24	1	10+5	0	1+1	0	6+1	1
5	MF	(Japan) JPN	Saki Kumagai	34	2	15+5	2	3+2	0	5+4	0
6	MF	(France) FRA	Amandine Henry	31	8	16+2	4	4+1	2	8	2
7	MF	(France) FRA	Amel Majri	31	15	16+2	10	4	1	8+1	4
8	MF	(England) ENG	Izzy Christiansen	18	4	8+6	2	1	1	2+1	1
9	FW	(France) FRA	Eugénie Le Sommer	31	21	15+3	13	5	2	8	6
10	MF	(Germany) GER	Dzsenifer Marozsán	27	14	14+1	10	4+1	2	5+2	2
11	FW	(Netherlands) NED	Shanice van de Sanden	31	8	11+8	7	1+4	1	3+4	0
14	FW	(Norway) NOR	Ada Hegerberg	33	29	18+2	20	4	2	9	7
16	GK	(France) FRA	Sarah Bouhaddi	26	0	18	0	1	0	7	0
18	MF	(France) FRA	Eva Kouache	5	0	2+2	0	1	0	0	0
19	MF	(France) FRA	Lorena Azzaro	1	0	0+1	0	0	0	0	0
20	FW	(France) FRA	Delphine Cascarino	29	5	10+8	3	3	1	3+5	1
21	DF	(Canada) CAN	Kadeisha Buchanan	14	1	8+3	1	2+1	0	0	0
24	MF	(Wales) WAL	Jess Fishlock	26	2	11+3	1	5	1	5+2	0
25	FW	(Argentina) ARG	Sole Jaimes	7	1	4+1	1	0+2	0	0	0
26	DF	(Germany) GER	Carolin Simon	14	0	13	0	0	0	1	0
27	FW	(France) FRA	Emelyne Laurent	14	1	2+8	1	0	0	0+4	0
28	FW	(France) FRA	Melvine Malard	4	0	0+2	0	1	0	0+1	0
29	DF	(France) FRA	Griedge Mbock	28	5	15+1	2	3	1	9	2
Players away from the club on loan:
Players who appeared for Olympique Lyonnais but left during the season:

=== Goal scorers ===
Place	Position	Nation	Number	Name	Division 1	Coupe de France	UEFA Champions League	Total
1	FW	(Norway)	14	Ada Hegerberg	20	2	7	29
2	FW	(France)	9	Eugénie Le Sommer	13	2	6	21
3	MF	(France)	7	Amel Majri	10	1	4	15
4	MF	(Germany)	10	Dzsenifer Marozsán	10	2	2	14
4	DF	(France)	3	Wendie Renard	8	2	4	14
6	FW	(Netherlands)	11	Shanice van de Sanden	7	1	0	8
6	MF	(France)	26	Amandine Henry	4	2	2	8
8	FW	(France)	20	Delphine Cascarino	3	1	1	5
8	DF	(France)	29	Griedge Mbock	2	1	2	5
8				Own goal	3	0	2	5
11	MF	(England)	8	Izzy Christiansen	2	1	1	4
12	MF	(Japan)	5	Saki Kumagai	2	0	0	2
12	MF	(Wales)	24	Jess Fishlock	1	1	0	2
12	DF	(England)	22	Lucy Bronze	1	0	1	2
15	DF	(Canada)	21	Kadeisha Buchanan	1	0	0	1
15	FW	(Argentina)	25	Sole Jaimes	1	0	0	1
15	FW	(France)	27	Emelyne Laurent	1	0	0	1
15	DF	(France)	4	Selma Bacha	0	0	1	1
Total					89	16	33	138

=== Clean sheets ===
Place	Position	Nation	Number	Name	Division 1	Coupe de France	UEFA Champions League	Total
1	GK	(France)	16	Sarah Bouhaddi	13	1	2	16
2	GK	(Germany)	1	Lisa Weiß	3	3	2	8
Total					16	4	4	24

=== Disciplinary record ===
Number	Nation	Position	Name	Division 1		Coupe de France		UEFA Champions League		Total	
Number	Nation	Position	Name	Booked	Sent off (straight red)	Booked	Sent off (straight red)	Booked	Sent off (straight red)	Booked	Sent off (straight red)
2	(England)	DF	Lucy Bronze	0	0	0	0	1	0	1	0
3	(France)	DF	Wendie Renard	0	0	1	0	3	0	3	0
4	(France)	DF	Selma Bacha	2	0	1	0	0	0	3	0
5	(Japan)	MF	Saki Kumagai	2	0	0	0	0	0	2	0
6	(France)	MF	Amandine Henry	0	0	1	0	1	0	1	0
7	(France)	MF	Amel Majri	1	0	0	0	0	0	1	0
8	(England)	MF	Izzy Christiansen	1	0	0	0	0	0	1	0
9	(France)	FW	Eugénie Le Sommer	0	0	1	0	1	0	2	0
10	(Germany)	MF	Dzsenifer Marozsán	0	0	0	0	1	0	1	0
11	(Netherlands)	FW	Shanice van de Sanden	1	0	0	0	1	0	2	0
14	(Norway)	FW	Ada Hegerberg	0	0	0	0	2	0	2	0
16	(France)	GK	Sarah Bouhaddi	0	0	1	0	1	0	1	0
20	(France)	FW	Delphine Cascarino	0	0	0	0	1	0	1	0
21	(Canada)	MF	Kadeisha Buchanan	2	0	0	0	0	0	2	0
24	(Wales)	MF	Jess Fishlock	0	0	0	0	1	0	1	0
29	(France)	MF	Griedge Mbock	1	0	0	0	0	0	1	0
Players away on loan:
Players who left Olympique Lyonnais during the season:
Total				10	0	5	0	14	0	29	0
