= 2019–20 Olympique Lyonnais Féminin season =

Olympique Lyonnais Féminin
2019–20 season
- Manager: Jean-Luc Vasseur
- Stadium: Groupama OL Training Center
- Division 1: Champions
- Coupe de France: Champions
- Trophée des Championnes: Champions
- UEFA Champions League: Champions
- Top goalscorer: League: Ada Hegerberg (14); All: Ada Hegerberg (23)
| Home colours | Away colours |

The 2019–20 Olympique Lyonnais Féminin season was the club's sixthteenth season since FC Lyon joined OL as its women's section. Olympique Lyonnais retained their Division 1 Féminine, Coupe de France Féminine and UEFA Women's Champions League titles.

== Season events ==
On 19 June, Olympique Lyonnais announced the signings of Katriina Talaslahti from Bayern Munich, Janice Cayman from Montpellier, Nikita Parris from Manchester City and Jéssica Silva from Levante.

On 8 August, Olympique Lyonnais announced the signing of Alex Greenwood, on a contract until 30 June 2020, from Manchester United for a fee of €40,000 rising to €60,000 depending on incentives.

On 31 January, Naomie Feller joined Olympique Lyonnais on loan from Stade Reims until the end of the season.

After 16 match days, the season was abandoned due to the COVID-19 pandemic in France. Lyon were declared champions, and Paris joined them in qualification for the 2020–21 UEFA Women's Champions League.

On 11 June, Shanice van de Sanden extended her contract with Olympique Lyonnais until 30 June 2021.

On 17 June 2020, Olympique Lyonnais announced a deal to signing of Ellie Carpenter from Portland Thorns. A week later, 24 June, Sakina Karchaoui joined Olympique Lyonnais from Montpellier on a contract until June 2021.

On 29 June, Lucy Bronze and Alex Greenwood both extended their contracts with Olympique Lyonnais for two-months, taking them to the end of the UEFA Champions League season.

On 1 July 2020, Olympique Lyonnais announced the signings of Lola Gallardo and Sara Gunnarsdóttir on contracts until June 2022.

On 3 July 2020, Olympique Lyonnais confirmed the signing of Ellie Carpenter on a contract until the summer of 2023.

On 4 August 2020, Olympique Lyonnais announced the signing of Jodie Taylor on a contract until 31 December 2020 from OL Reign.

== Squad ==
As of match played 30 August 2020

| No. | Name | Nationality | Position | Date of birth (age) | Signed from | Signed in | Contract ends | Apps. | Goals |
Goalkeepers
| 1 | Lola Gallardo | (Spain) | GK | 10 June 1993 (aged 27) | Atlético Madrid | 2020 | 2022 | 0 | 0 |
| 16 | Sarah Bouhaddi | (France) | GK | 17 October 1986 (aged 33) | Juvisy | 2009 | | 282 | 1 |
| 40 | Katriina Talaslahti | (Finland) | GK | 21 September 2000 (aged 19) | Bayern Munich | 2019 | 2022 | 0 | 0 |
Defenders
| 2 | Lucy Bronze | (England) | DF | 28 October 1991 (aged 28) | Manchester City | 2017 | 2020 | 87 | 6 |
| 3 | Wendie Renard | (France) | DF | 20 July 1990 (aged 30) | Academy | 2006 | | 370 | 116 |
| 4 | Selma Bacha | (France) | DF | 9 November 2000 (aged 19) | Academy | 2017 | | 62 | 3 |
| 12 | Ellie Carpenter | (Australia) | DF | 28 April 2000 (aged 20) | Portland Thorns | 2020 | 2023 | 0 | 0 |
| 13 | Manon Revelli | (France) | DF | 26 November 2001 (aged 18) | Academy | 2019 | | 2 | 0 |
| 15 | Alex Greenwood | (England) | DF | 7 September 1993 (aged 26) | Manchester United | 2019 | 2020 | 17 | 0 |
| 21 | Kadeisha Buchanan | (Canada) | DF | 5 November 1995 (aged 24) | West Virginia Mountaineers | 2017 | | 70 | 2 |
| 24 | Grace Kazadi | (France) | DF | 31 January 2001 (aged 19) | Academy | 2020 | | 0 | 0 |
| 26 | Sakina Karchaoui | (France) | DF | 26 January 1996 (aged 24) | Montpellier | 2020 | 2021 | 3 | 0 |
| 29 | Griedge Mbock Bathy | (France) | DF | 26 February 1995 (aged 25) | Guingamp | 2015 | | 135 | 26 |
| | Florine Belin | (France) | DF | 4 August 2003 (aged 17) | Academy | 2020 | | 0 | 0 |
| | Clara Moreira | (France) | DF | 21 February 2001 (aged 19) | Academy | 2020 | | 0 | 0 |
Midfielders
| 5 | Saki Kumagai | (Japan) | MF | 17 October 1990 (aged 29) | 1. FFC Frankfurt | 2013 | | 216 | 38 |
| 6 | Amandine Henry | (France) | MF | 28 September 1989 (aged 30) | Portland Thorns | 2018 | 2021 | 279 | 57 |
| 7 | Amel Majri | (France) | MF | 25 January 1993 (aged 27) | Academy | 2010 | | 219 | 65 |
| 8 | Sara Björk Gunnarsdóttir | (Iceland) | MF | 29 September 1990 (aged 29) | VfL Wolfsburg | 2020 | 2022 | 5 | 1 |
| 10 | Dzsenifer Marozsán | (Germany) | MF | 18 April 1992 (aged 28) | 1. FFC Frankfurt | 2016 | | 118 | 46 |
| 18 | Eva Kouache | (France) | MF | 7 January 2000 (aged 20) | Academy | 2018 | | 6 | 0 |
| 19 | Lorena Azzaro | (France) | MF | 22 October 2000 (aged 19) | Academy | 2018 | | 1 | 0 |
| 22 | Sally Julini | (Switzerland) | MF | 1 January 2003 (aged 17) | Academy | 2020 | | 0 | 0 |
| 23 | Janice Cayman | (Belgium) | MF | 12 October 1988 (aged 31) | Montpellier | 2019 | 2021 | 9 | 2 |
| | Yasmine Klai | (France) | MF | 15 September 2002 (aged 17) | Academy | 2017 | | 0 | 0 |
| | Marine Pierret | (France) | MF | 15 October 2001 (aged 18) | Academy | 2019 | | 0 | 0 |
Forwards
| 9 | Eugénie Le Sommer | (France) | FW | 18 May 1989 (aged 31) | Stade Briochin | 2010 | | 311 | 270 |
| 11 | Shanice van de Sanden | (Netherlands) | FW | 2 October 1992 (aged 27) | Liverpool | 2017 | 2021 | 74 | 12 |
| 14 | Ada Hegerberg | (Norway) | FW | 10 July 1995 (aged 25) | Turbine Potsdam | 2014 | | 184 | 220 |
| 17 | Nikita Parris | (England) | FW | 10 March 1994 (aged 26) | Manchester City | 2019 | 2022 | 26 | 17 |
| 19 | Jéssica Silva | (Portugal) | FW | 11 December 1994 (aged 25) | Levante | 2019 | 2021 | 6 | 2 |
| 20 | Delphine Cascarino | (France) | FW | 5 February 1997 (aged 23) | Academy | 2015 | | 120 | 28 |
| 28 | Melvine Malard | (France) | FW | 28 June 2000 (aged 20) | Academy | 2017 | | 5 | 0 |
| 31 | Jodie Taylor | (England) | FW | 17 May 1986 (aged 34) | OL Reign | 2020 | 2020 | 3 | 0 |
| | Cyrine Ben Rabah | (France) | FW | 27 November 2002 (aged 17) | Academy | 2017 | | 0 | 0 |
Out on loan
| 27 | Emelyne Laurent | (France) | FW | 4 November 1998 (aged 21) | Bordeaux | 2017 | | 19 | 4 |
Left during the season
| 1 | Lisa Weiß | (Germany) | GK | 29 October 1987 (aged 32) | SGS Essen | 2018 | 2020 | 13 | 0 |
| 8 | Izzy Christiansen | (England) | MF | 20 September 1991 (aged 28) | Manchester City | 2018 | | 26 | 5 |
| 12 | Naomie Feller | (France) | FW | 6 November 2001 (aged 18) | on loan from Reims | 2020 | 2020 | 3 | 1 |
| 26 | Carolin Simon | (Germany) | DF | 24 November 1992 (aged 27) | SC Freiburg | 2018 | 2020 | 14 | 0 |
| | Jessy Danielle Roux | (France) | FW | 30 March 2000 (aged 20) | Academy | 2017 | | 0 | 0 |

== Transfers ==
=== In ===
| Date | Position | Nationality | Name | From | Fee | Ref. |
|---|---|---|---|---|---|---|
| 19 June 2019 | GK | (Finland) | Katriina Talaslahti | Bayern Munich | Undisclosed | |
| 19 June 2019 | MF | (Belgium) | Janice Cayman | Montpellier | Undisclosed | |
| 19 June 2019 | FW | (England) | Nikita Parris | Manchester City | Undisclosed | |
| 19 June 2019 | FW | (Portugal) | Jéssica Silva | Levante | Undisclosed | |
| 8 August 2019 | DF | (England) | Alex Greenwood | Manchester United | €40,000 | |
| 17 June 2020 | DF | (Australia) | Ellie Carpenter | Portland Thorns | Undisclosed | |
| 24 June 2020 | DF | (France) | Sakina Karchaoui | Montpellier | Undisclosed | |
| 1 July 2020 | GK | (Spain) | Lola Gallardo | Atlético Madrid | Undisclosed | |
| 1 July 2020 | MF | (Iceland) | Sara Björk Gunnarsdóttir | VfL Wolfsburg | Undisclosed | |
| 4 August 2020 | FW | (England) | Jodie Taylor | OL Reign | Undisclosed | |

=== Loans in ===
| Start date | Position | Nationality | Name | From | End date | Ref. |
|---|---|---|---|---|---|---|
| 31 January 2020 | FW | (France) | Naomie Feller | Reims | 30 June 2020 | |

=== Out ===
| Date | Position | Nationality | Name | To | Fee | Ref. |
|---|---|---|---|---|---|---|
| 9 August 2019 | DF | (Germany) | Carolin Simon | Bayern Munich | Undisclosed | |
| 27 December 2019 | MF | (England) | Izzy Christiansen | Everton | Undisclosed | |

=== Loans out ===
| Start date | Position | Nationality | Name | To | End date | Ref. |
|---|---|---|---|---|---|---|
| 1 July 2019 | FW | (France) | Emelyne Laurent | Bordeaux | 30 June 2020 | |
| 1 August 2020 | DF | (France) | Grace Kazadi | Atlético Madrid | 30 June 2021 | |
| 5 August 2020 | FW | (France) | Emelyne Laurent | Atlético Madrid | 30 June 2021 | |

=== Released ===
| Date | Position | Nationality | Name | Joined | Date | Ref. |
|---|---|---|---|---|---|---|
| 30 June 2020 | GK | (Germany) | Lisa Weiß | Aston Villa | 23 July 2020 | |
| 31 August 2020 | DF | (England) | Lucy Bronze | Manchester City | 8 September 2020 | |
| 31 August 2020 | DF | (England) | Alex Greenwood | Manchester City | 9 September 2020 | |

== Friendlies ==
=== International Champions Cup ===
| 15 August 2019 Semifinal | Olympique Lyonnais (France) | 1–0 | (Spain) Atlético Madrid | Cary, United States |
| 23:00 CEST (UTC+2) | Renard 90+1' | Report | | Stadium: Sahlen's Stadium |

| 19 August 2018 Final | North Carolina Courage (United States) | 0–1 | (France) Olympique Lyonnais | Cary, United States |
| 01:00 CEST (UTC+2) | Dahlkemper (yellow card) 89' | Report | Marozsán 57'; Bouhaddi (yellow card) 68' van de Sanden (yellow card) 90+4' | Stadium: Sahlen's Stadium; Attendance: 8,208 |

== Competitions ==
=== Overview ===
| Competition | First match | Last match | Starting round | Final position | Record | | | | | | | |
| Competition | First match | Last match | Starting round | Final position | Pld | W | D | L | GF | GA | GD | Win % |
|---|---|---|---|---|---|---|---|---|---|---|---|---|
| Division 1 | 24 August 2019 | 28 April 2020 | Matchday 1 | Winners | 16 | 14 | 2 | 0 | 67 | 4 | +63 | 87.50 |
| Coupe de France | 12 January 2020 | 9 August 2020 | Round of 32 | Winners | 5 | 4 | 1 | 0 | 14 | 1 | +13 | 80.00 |
| Trophée des Championnes | 21 September 2019 | 21 September 2019 | Final | Winners | 1 | 0 | 1 | 0 | 1 | 1 | +0 | 0.00 |
| UEFA Champions League | 11 September 2019 | 30 August 2020 | Round of 32 | Winners | 7 | 7 | 0 | 0 | 33 | 2 | +31 | 100.00 |
| Total | | | | | 29 | 25 | 4 | 0 | 115 | 8 | +107 | 86.21 |

Last updated: 30 August 2020
Source: Competitions

=== Trophée des Championnes ===
| 21 September 2019 Final | Olympique Lyonnais | 1–1 (4–3 p) | Paris Saint-Germain | Guingamp |
| 15:30 CEST (UTC+2) | Majri 31' | | Nadim (yellow card) 27' (goal) 43'; Morroni (yellow card) 94' | Stadium: Stade de Roudourou; Attendance: 12,558; Referee: Jennifer Maubacq |
| | Penalties |
| | Majri (penalty scored); Mbock (penalty scored); Le Sommer (penalty missed); Hegerberg (penalty scored); Renard (penalty scored) | | (penalty missed) Katoto; (penalty scored) Däbritz; (penalty scored) Diani; (penalty scored) Geyoro; (penalty missed) Dudek |

=== Division 1 ===
==== Results summary ====
| Overall | | | | | | | | Home | | | | | | Away | | | | | |
| Pld | W | D | L | GF | GA | GD | Pts | W | D | L | GF | GA | GD | W | D | L | GF | GA | GD |
|---|---|---|---|---|---|---|---|---|---|---|---|---|---|---|---|---|---|---|---|
| 16 | 14 | 2 | 0 | 67 | 4 | +63 | 44 | 9 | 0 | 0 | 39 | 0 | +39 | 5 | 2 | 0 | 28 | 4 | +24 |

Last updated: 23 February 2020.

==== Results by matchday ====
| Matchday | 1 | 2 | 3 | 4 | 5 | 6 | 7 | 8 | 9 | 10 | 11 | 12 | 13 | 14 | 15 | 16 |
|---|---|---|---|---|---|---|---|---|---|---|---|---|---|---|---|---|
| Ground | H | A | H | A | H | A | H | A | H | A | H | H | A | H | A | H |
| Result | W | W | W | W | W | D | W | W | W | W | W | W | D | W | W | W |
| Position | 2 | 2 | 1 | 1 | 1 | 2 | 2 | 1 | 1 | 1 | 1 | 1 | 1 | 1 | 1 | 1 |

Updated to match(es) played on 23 February 2020. Source: Results
A = Away; H = Home; W = Win; D = Draw; L = Loss; P = Postponed

==== Results ====
| 24 August 2019 1 | Olympique Lyonnais | 6–0 | Olympique Marseille | Décines-Charpieu |
| 15:30 CEST (UTC+2) | Parris 3'; Le Sommer 11'; Marozsán 17'; Cascarino 77'; Hegerberg 83', 84' | Report | Blanc (yellow card) 44' (yellow-red card) 64'; Ali Nadjim (yellow card) 77'; Lamarque (yellow card) 84' | Stadium: Stade Gérard Houllier; Referee: Victoria Beyer |

| 7 September 2019 2 | Stade Reims | 3–8 | Olympique Lyonnais | Reims |
| 16:30 CEST (UTC+2) | Feller 8', 40'; David 51' (yellow card) 54'; Doucouré (yellow card) 58' | Report | Cascarino 1'; Hegerberg 3', 77', 88'; Renard 20'; Henry 29' (yellow card) 65'; Majri 44', 81' (pen.) | Stadium: Stade Auguste-Delaune II; Referee: Camille Soriano |

| 15 September 2019 3 | Olympique Lyonnais | 6–0 | Fleury 91 | Décines-Charpieu |
| 16:30 CEST (UTC+2) | Marozsán 10', 39'; Le Sommer 31', 51'; Mbock 56'; Christiansen 75' | Report | | Stadium: Stade Gérard Houllier; Referee: Jennifer Maubacq |

| 28 September 2019 4 | Guingamp | 1–5 | Olympique Lyonnais | Guingamp |
| 20:40 CEST (UTC+2) | Fleury 73' | Report | Le Sommer 14'; Marozsán 19' (pen.), 72'; Cascarino 34'; Hegerberg 90' | Stadium: Stade de Roudourou; Referee: Stephanie di Benedetto |

| 12 October 2019 5 | Olympique Lyonnais | 4–0 | Paris FC | Décines-Charpieu |
| 14:30 CEST (UTC+2) | Renard 45' (yellow card) 72'; Hegerberg 47', 88'; Le Sommer 61' | Report | Vaysse (yellow card) 60'; Benoît (yellow card) 85' | Stadium: Stade Gérard Houllier; Referee: Elodie Coppola |

| 20 October 2019 6 | Dijon FCO | 0–0 | Olympique Lyonnais | Dijon |
| 14:45 CEST (UTC+2) | Declercq (yellow card) 83' | Report | | Stadium: Stade Gaston Gérard; Referee: Camille Soriano |

| 26 October 2019 7 | Olympique Lyonnais | 4–0 | Girondins Bordeaux | Décines-Charpieu |
| 15:30 CEST (UTC+2) | Henry 19'; Hegerberg 44'; Parris 45' van de Sanden 79'; Renard (yellow card) 90+2' | Report | Lavogez (yellow card) 33'; Asseyi (yellow card) 61' | Stadium: Stade Gérard Houllier; Referee: Jennifer Maubacq |

| 2 November 2019 8 | Montpellier | 0–3 | Olympique Lyonnais | Montpellier |
| 15:30 CET (UTC+1) | Toletti (yellow card) 87' | Report | Renard 4' (yellow card) 65'; Marozsán 39' (yellow card) 67'; Hegerberg 71' | Stadium: Stade Bernard Gasset; Referee: Elodie Coppola |

| 16 November 2019 9 | Olympique Lyonnais | 1–0 | Paris Saint-Germain | Décines-Charpieu |
| 17:30 CET (UTC+1) | Kumagai 49' | Report | Formiga (yellow card) 47'; Paredes (yellow card) 58'; Huitema (yellow card) 85' | Stadium: Parc Olympique Lyonnais; Referee: Victoria Beyer |

| 24 November 2019 10 | Soyaux | 0–4 | Olympique Lyonnais | Angoulême |
| 14:45 CET (UTC+1) | | Report | Hegerberg 10'; Parris 36'; Marozsán 68'; Henry 89' | Stadium: Stade Camille Lebon; Referee: Savina Elbour |

| 8 December 2019 11 | Olympique Lyonnais | 6–0 | Metz | Décines-Charpieu |
| 14:45 CET (UTC+1) | Hegerberg 12', 45' (pen.), 75'; Mbock 35', 38'; Parris 61' | Report | Godart (yellow card) 70' | Stadium: Stade Gérard Houllier; Referee: Savina Elbour |

| 14 December 2019 12 | Olympique Lyonnais | 2–0 | Dijon FCO | Décines-Charpieu |
| 15:30 CET (UTC+1) | Mbock (yellow card) 57'; Renard 75' van de Sanden 90+3' | Report | Lavaud (yellow card) 72' | Stadium: Stade Gérard Houllier; Referee: Victoria Beyer |

| 19 January 2020 13 | Girondins Bordeaux | 0–0 | Olympique Lyonnais | Le Bouscat |
| 15:00 CET (UTC+1) | Lavogez (yellow card) 59' | Report | Henry (yellow card) 45+1'; Buchanan (yellow card) 56' | Stadium: Stade Sainte Germaine; Referee: Stephanie di Benedetto |

| 26 January 2020 14 | Olympique Lyonnais | 5–0 | Stade Reims | Décines-Charpieu |
| 17:00 CET (UTC+1) | Majri 11', 54'; Parris 52'; Renard 67' (pen.); Silva 87' | Report | Simon (yellow card) 29' | Stadium: Stade Gérard Houllier; Referee: Victoria Beyer |

| 8 February 2020 15 | Olympique Marseille | 0–8 | Olympique Lyonnais | Marseille |
| 15:30 CET (UTC+1) | Altunkulak (yellow card) 86' | Report | Kumagai 15'; Renard 40' (pen.), 64'; Mbock 49'; Marozsán 73', 89' (pen.); Parris 60'; Feller 67' | Stadium: Stade Paul Le Cesne; Referee: Jennifer Maubacq |

| 23 February 2020 16 | Olympique Lyonnais | 5–0 | Montpellier | Décines-Charpieu |
| 14:15 CEST (UTC+2) | Henry 1'; Kumagai (yellow card) 3'; Majri 51'; Parris 58', 60'; Marozsán 90+4' | Report | Mondésir (yellow card) 65' | Stadium: Stade Gérard Houllier; Referee: Camille Soriano |

| 14 March 2020 17 | Paris Saint-Germain | v | Olympique Lyonnais | Paris |
| CEST (UTC+2) | | | | Stadium: Stade Jean-Bouin |

| 28 March 2020 18 | Fleury 91 | v | Olympique Lyonnais | Fleury-Mérogis |
| CEST (UTC+2) | | | | Stadium: Stade Auguste Gentelet |

| 4 April 2020 19 | Olympique Lyonnais | v | Soyaux | Décines-Charpieu |
| CEST (UTC+2) | | | | Stadium: Stade Gérard Houllier |

| 18 April 2020 20 | Metz | v | Olympique Lyonnais | Longeville-lès-Metz |
| CEST (UTC+2) | | | | Stadium: Stade Saint-Symphorien |

| 16 May 2020 21 | Olympique Lyonnais | v | Guingamp | Décines-Charpieu |
| CEST (UTC+2) | | | | Stadium: Stade Gérard Houllier |

| 30 May 2020 22 | Paris FC | v | Olympique Lyonnais | Paris |
| CEST (UTC+2) | | | | Stadium: Stade Sébastien Charléty |

==== Table ====
| Pos | Team | Pld | W | D | L | GF | GA | GD | Pts | Qualification or relegation |
|---|---|---|---|---|---|---|---|---|---|---|
| 1 | Lyon (C) | 16 | 14 | 2 | 0 | 67 | 4 | +63 | 44 | Qualification for the Champions League Round of 32 |
| 2 | Paris Saint-Germain | 16 | 13 | 2 | 1 | 60 | 7 | +53 | 41 | Qualification for the Champions League Round of 32 |
| 3 | Bordeaux | 16 | 12 | 1 | 3 | 36 | 12 | +24 | 37 | |
| 4 | Montpellier | 16 | 9 | 3 | 4 | 39 | 18 | +21 | 30 | |
| 5 | Paris FC | 16 | 7 | 3 | 6 | 21 | 26 | −5 | 24 | |
| 6 | Guingamp | 16 | 6 | 5 | 5 | 20 | 21 | −1 | 23 | |
| 7 | Fleury | 16 | 6 | 2 | 8 | 18 | 30 | −12 | 20 | |
| 8 | Reims | 16 | 4 | 3 | 9 | 13 | 32 | −19 | 15 | |
| 9 | Dijon | 16 | 3 | 5 | 8 | 10 | 32 | −22 | 14 | |
| 10 | Soyaux | 16 | 4 | 4 | 8 | 15 | 30 | −15 | 13 (Note: 3 points deduction (sanctioned by DNCG).) | |
| 11 | Marseille (R) | 16 | 2 | 0 | 14 | 12 | 62 | −50 | 6 | Relegation to Division 2 Féminine |
| 12 | Metz (R) | 16 | 0 | 2 | 14 | 7 | 44 | −37 | 2 | Relegation to Division 2 Féminine |

Rules for classification: 1) points; 2) head-to-head points; 3) head-to-head goal difference; 4) goal difference; 5) goals scored
(C) Champions; (R) Relegated

=== Coupe de France ===
| 12 January 2020 Round of 32 | Olympique Lyonnais | 9–1 | Olympique Marseille | Décines-Charpieu |
| 15:30 CET (UTC+1) | Parris 12', 40', 46', 86'; Le Sommer 21', 35'; Marozsán 47'; Renard 49'; Cayman 75' | | Cardia 8' | Stadium: Groupama OL Training Center; Attendance: 1,206; Referee: Maika Vanderstichel |

| 1 February 2020 Round of 16 | Thonon Evian | 0–2 | Olympique Lyonnais | Thonon-les-Bains |
| 13:15 CET (UTC+1) | Jbarah (yellow card) 22'; Khelif (yellow card) 29'; Jung (yellow card) 43'; Messomo (yellow card) 82' | | Marozsán 17'; Renard 44'; Greenwood (yellow card) 81' | Stadium: Stade Joseph-Moynat; Attendance: 2,568; Referee: Savina Elbour |

| 15 February 2020 Quarterfinal | Dijon FCO | 0–2 | Olympique Lyonnais | Dijon |
| 12:00 CET (UTC+1) | | | Cascarino 51'; Parris 75' | Stadium: Stade des Poussots; Attendance: 552; Referee: Maika Vanderstichel |

| 2 August 2020 Semifinal | Guingamp | 0–1 | Olympique Lyonnais | Guingamp |
| 14:00 CEST (UTC+2) | Lukas (yellow card) 67'; Daoudi (yellow card) 78'; Traoré (yellow card) 82' | | Parris 65'; Kumagai (yellow card) 88' | Stadium: Stade de Roudourou; Attendance: 1,196; Referee: Savina Elbour |

| 9 August 2020 Final | Olympique Lyonnais | 0–0 (4–3 p) | Paris Saint-Germain | Auxerre |
| 20:00 | Le Sommer (yellow card) 90' | | Katoto (yellow card) 28' | Stadium: Stade de l'Abbé-Deschamps; Attendance: 4,500; Referee: Victoria Beyer |
| | Penalties |
| | Majri (penalty scored); Marozsán (penalty scored); Renard (penalty scored); Le Sommer (penalty missed); Bronze (penalty scored) | | (penalty scored) Nadim; (penalty scored) Däbritz; (penalty scored) Bruun; (penalty missed) Endler; (penalty missed) Khelifi |

=== UEFA Champions League ===
| 11 September 2019 Round of 32 1st leg | Ryazan-VDV (Russia) | 0–9 | (France) Olympique Lyonnais | Ryazan, Russia |
| 14:00 CEST (UTC+2) | Eremeeva (yellow card) 11'; Lazarević (yellow card) 36'; Turieva (yellow card) 90+1' | Report | Marozsán 12' (pen.); Hegerberg 27', 39', 70' (pen.); Renard 31', 77', 90'; Henry 37'; Majri 78' (pen.) | Stadium: CSK Stadium; Attendance: 2,570; Referee: Elvira Nurmustafina (Kazakhstan) |

| 25 September 2019 Round of 32 2nd leg | Olympique Lyonnais (France) | 7–0 (16–0 agg.) | (Russia) Ryazan-VDV | Décines-Charpieu, France |
| 16:30 CEST (UTC+2) | Le Sommer 18'; Parris 21', 88'; Cascarino 40'; Hegerberg 55' (pen.), 90'; Renard 90+2' (pen.) | Report | Lazarević (yellow card) 72' | Stadium: Groupama OL Training Center; Attendance: 701; Referee: Silvia Domingos (Portugal) |

| 16 October 2019 Round of 16 1st leg | Fortuna Hjørring (Denmark) | 0–4 | (France) Olympique Lyonnais | Hjørring, Denmark |
| 19:00 CEST (UTC+2) | Snerle (yellow card) 87' | Report | Hegerberg 17' (pen.), 54'; Le Sommer 29', 41' | Stadium: Hjørring Stadium; Attendance: 1,953; Referee: Lorraine Clark (Scotland) |

| 30 October 2019 Round of 16 2nd leg | Olympique Lyonnais (France) | 7–0 (11–0 agg.) | (Denmark) Fortuna Hjørring | Décines-Charpieu, France |
| 16:30 CET (UTC+1) | Hegerberg 12', 46'; Le Sommer 34'; Mbock Bathy 65'; Silva 81'; Buchanan 83'; Parris 90+3' | Report | | Stadium: Groupama OL Training Center; Attendance: 1,037; Referee: Cheryl Foster (Wales) |

| 22 August 2020 Quarterfinal | Olympique Lyonnais (France) | 2–1 | (Germany) Bayern Munich | Bilbao, Spain |
| 20:00 CEST (UTC+2) | Parris 41'; Marozsán (yellow card) 55'; Majri 59'; Karchaoui (yellow card) 72' | Report | Benkarth (yellow card) 43'; Simon 64'; Hegering (yellow card) 89'; Dallmann (yellow card) 90+3' | Stadium: San Mamés; Attendance: 0 Referee: Kateryna Monzul (Ukraine) |
Note: Match played behind closed doors due to the COVID-19 pandemic in Europe.

| 26 August 2020 Semifinal | Paris Saint-Germain (France) | 0–1 | (France) Olympique Lyonnais | Bilbao, Spain |
| 20:00 CEST (UTC+2) | Nadim (yellow card) 17'; Geyoro (yellow card) 29' (yellow-red card) 65' | Report | Parris (yellow card) 52' (yellow-red card) 75'; Renard 67' | Stadium: San Mamés; Attendance: 0 Referee: Anastasia Pustovoitova (Russia) |
Note: Match played behind closed doors due to the COVID-19 pandemic in Europe.

==== Final ====
| 30 August 2020 Final | VfL Wolfsburg (Germany) | 1–3 | (France) Olympique Lyonnais | San Sebastián, Spain |
| 20:00 CEST (UTC+2) | Huth (yellow card) 14'; Popp 58' | Report | Le Sommer 25'; Marozsán (yellow card) 40'; Kumagai 44'; Gunnarsdóttir 88' | Stadium: Anoeta Stadium; Attendance: 0 Referee: Esther Staubli (Switzerland) |
Note: Match played behind closed doors due to the COVID-19 pandemic in Europe.

== Squad statistics ==
As of match played 30 August 2020

=== Appearances ===
| No. | Pos | Nat | Player | Total | | Division 1 | | Coupe de France | | Trophée des Championnes | | UEFA Champions League | |
| No. | Pos | Nat | Player | Apps | Goals | Apps | Goals | Apps | Goals | Apps | Goals | Apps | Goals |
|---|---|---|---|---|---|---|---|---|---|---|---|---|---|
| 2 | DF | (England) ENG | Lucy Bronze | 27 | 0 | 15 | 0 | 5 | 0 | 1 | 0 | 6 | 0 |
| 3 | DF | (France) FRA | Wendie Renard | 26 | 14 | 14 | 7 | 5 | 2 | 1 | 0 | 6 | 5 |
| 4 | DF | (France) FRA | Selma Bacha | 15 | 0 | 4+2 | 0 | 3+1 | 0 | 0 | 0 | 3+2 | 0 |
| 5 | MF | (Japan) JPN | Saki Kumagai | 26 | 3 | 12+2 | 2 | 5 | 0 | 1 | 0 | 6 | 1 |
| 6 | MF | (France) FRA | Amandine Henry | 24 | 5 | 14+1 | 4 | 5 | 0 | 1 | 0 | 3 | 1 |
| 7 | MF | (France) FRA | Amel Majri | 26 | 8 | 12+2 | 5 | 4+1 | 0 | 1 | 1 | 6 | 2 |
| 8 | MF | (Iceland) ISL | Sara Gunnarsdóttir | 5 | 1 | 0 | 0 | 0+2 | 0 | 0 | 0 | 2+1 | 1 |
| 9 | FW | (France) FRA | Eugénie Le Sommer | 21 | 13 | 9+2 | 5 | 2+1 | 3 | 1 | 0 | 5+1 | 5 |
| 10 | MF | (Germany) GER | Dzsenifer Marozsán | 28 | 13 | 16 | 10 | 5 | 2 | 1 | 0 | 6 | 1 |
| 11 | FW | (Netherlands) NED | Shanice van de Sanden | 19 | 2 | 0+11 | 2 | 0+5 | 0 | 0 | 0 | 1+2 | 0 |
| 12 | FW | (France) FRA | Naomie Feller | 3 | 1 | 0+2 | 1 | 0+1 | 0 | 0 | 0 | 0 | 0 |
| 13 | DF | (France) FRA | Manon Revelli | 2 | 0 | 0+1 | 0 | 0 | 0 | 0 | 0 | 0+1 | 0 |
| 14 | FW | (Norway) NOR | Ada Hegerberg | 18 | 23 | 13 | 14 | 0 | 0 | 1 | 0 | 4 | 9 |
| 15 | DF | (England) ENG | Alex Greenwood | 17 | 0 | 11 | 0 | 3+1 | 0 | 1 | 0 | 0+1 | 0 |
| 16 | GK | (France) FRA | Sarah Bouhaddi | 26 | 0 | 16 | 0 | 2 | 0 | 1 | 0 | 7 | 0 |
| 17 | FW | (England) ENG | Nikita Parris | 26 | 17 | 10+5 | 8 | 5 | 5 | 0 | 0 | 5+1 | 4 |
| 18 | MF | (France) FRA | Eva Kouache | 1 | 0 | 0 | 0 | 0 | 0 | 0 | 0 | 0+1 | 0 |
| 19 | FW | (Portugal) POR | Jéssica Silva | 6 | 2 | 0+2 | 1 | 0+1 | 0 | 0 | 0 | 0+3 | 1 |
| 20 | FW | (France) FRA | Delphine Cascarino | 28 | 5 | 10+6 | 3 | 3+1 | 1 | 0+1 | 0 | 4+3 | 1 |
| 21 | DF | (Canada) CAN | Kadeisha Buchanan | 15 | 1 | 3+2 | 0 | 2+1 | 0 | 0 | 0 | 5+2 | 1 |
| 23 | DF | (Belgium) BEL | Janice Cayman | 9 | 2 | 3+1 | 0 | 1+2 | 1 | 0 | 0 | 2 | 1 |
| 26 | DF | (France) FRA | Sakina Karchaoui | 3 | 0 | 0 | 0 | 0 | 0 | 0 | 0 | 2+1 | 0 |
| 29 | DF | (France) FRA | Griedge Mbock | 21 | 5 | 14+1 | 4 | 2 | 0 | 1 | 0 | 3 | 1 |
| 31 | FW | (England) ENG | Jodie Taylor | 3 | 0 | 0 | 0 | 0+1 | 0 | 0 | 0 | 0+2 | 0 |
Players away from the club on loan:
| 27 | FW | (France) FRA | Emelyne Laurent | 1 | 0 | 0+1 | 0 | 0 | 0 | 0 | 0 | 0 | 0 |
Players who appeared for Olympique Lyonnais but left during the season:
| 1 | GK | (Germany) GER | Lisa Weiß | 3 | 0 | 0 | 0 | 3 | 0 | 0 | 0 | 0 | 0 |
| 8 | MF | (England) ENG | Izzy Christiansen | 8 | 1 | 0+6 | 1 | 0 | 0 | 0 | 0 | 1+1 | 0 |

=== Goal scorers ===
| Place | Position | Nation | Number | Name | Division 1 | Coupe de France | Trophée des Championnes | UEFA Champions League | Total |
|---|---|---|---|---|---|---|---|---|---|
| 1 | FW | (Norway) | 14 | Ada Hegerberg | 14 | 0 | 0 | 9 | 23 |
| 2 | FW | (England) | 17 | Nikita Parris | 8 | 6 | 0 | 4 | 18 |
| 3 | DF | (France) | 3 | Wendie Renard | 7 | 2 | 0 | 5 | 14 |
| 4 | MF | (Germany) | 10 | Dzsenifer Marozsán | 10 | 2 | 0 | 1 | 13 |
| 5 | FW | (France) | 9 | Eugénie Le Sommer | 5 | 2 | 0 | 5 | 12 |
| 6 | MF | (France) | 7 | Amel Majri | 5 | 0 | 1 | 2 | 8 |
| 7 | MF | (France) | 6 | Amandine Henry | 4 | 0 | 0 | 1 | 5 |
| 7 | DF | (France) | 29 | Griedge Mbock | 4 | 0 | 0 | 1 | 5 |
| 7 | FW | (France) | 20 | Delphine Cascarino | 3 | 1 | 0 | 1 | 5 |
| 10 | MF | (Japan) | 5 | Saki Kumagai | 2 | 0 | 0 | 1 | 3 |
| 11 | FW | (Netherlands) | 11 | Shanice van de Sanden | 2 | 0 | 0 | 0 | 2 |
| 11 | FW | (Portugal) | 19 | Jéssica Silva | 1 | 0 | 0 | 1 | 2 |
| 13 | MF | (England) | 8 | Izzy Christiansen | 1 | 0 | 0 | 0 | 1 |
| 13 | FW | (France) | 12 | Naomie Feller | 1 | 0 | 0 | 0 | 1 |
| 13 | DF | (Belgium) | 23 | Janice Cayman | 0 | 1 | 0 | 0 | 1 |
| 13 | DF | (Canada) | 21 | Kadeisha Buchanan | 0 | 0 | 0 | 1 | 1 |
| 13 | MF | (Iceland) | 8 | Sara Gunnarsdóttir | 0 | 0 | 0 | 1 | 1 |
| Total | | | | | 67 | 14 | 1 | 33 | 115 |

=== Clean sheets ===
| Place | Position | Nation | Number | Name | Division 1 | Coupe de France | Trophée des Championnes | UEFA Champions League | Total |
|---|---|---|---|---|---|---|---|---|---|
| 1 | GK | (France) | 16 | Sarah Bouhaddi | 14 | 2 | 0 | 5 | 21 |
| 2 | GK | (Germany) | 1 | Lisa Weiß | 0 | 2 | 0 | 0 | 2 |
| Total | | | | | 14 | 4 | 0 | 5 | 23 |

=== Disciplinary record ===
| Number | Nation | Position | Name | Division 1 | | Coupe de France | | Trophée des Championnes | | UEFA Champions League | | Total | |
| Number | Nation | Position | Name | Booked | Sent off (straight red) | Booked | Sent off (straight red) | Booked | Sent off (straight red) | Booked | Sent off (straight red) | Booked | Sent off (straight red) |
|---|---|---|---|---|---|---|---|---|---|---|---|---|---|
| 3 | (France) | DF | Wendie Renard | 3 | 0 | 0 | 0 | 0 | 0 | 0 | 0 | 3 | 0 |
| 5 | (Japan) | MF | Saki Kumagai | 1 | 0 | 1 | 0 | 0 | 0 | 0 | 0 | 2 | 0 |
| 6 | (France) | MF | Amandine Henry | 2 | 0 | 0 | 0 | 0 | 0 | 0 | 0 | 2 | 0 |
| 9 | (France) | FW | Eugénie Le Sommer | 0 | 0 | 1 | 0 | 0 | 0 | 0 | 0 | 1 | 0 |
| 10 | (Germany) | MF | Dzsenifer Marozsán | 1 | 0 | 0 | 0 | 0 | 0 | 2 | 0 | 3 | 0 |
| 15 | (England) | DF | Alex Greenwood | 0 | 0 | 1 | 0 | 0 | 0 | 0 | 0 | 1 | 0 |
| 17 | (England) | FW | Nikita Parris | 0 | 0 | 0 | 0 | 0 | 0 | 2 | 1 | 2 | 0 |
| 21 | (Canada) | DF | Kadeisha Buchanan | 1 | 0 | 0 | 0 | 0 | 0 | 0 | 0 | 1 | 0 |
| 26 | (France) | DF | Sakina Karchaoui | 0 | 0 | 0 | 0 | 0 | 0 | 1 | 0 | 1 | 0 |
| 29 | (France) | DF | Griedge Mbock | 1 | 0 | 0 | 0 | 0 | 0 | 0 | 0 | 1 | 0 |
Players away on loan:
Players who left Olympique Lyonnais during the season:
| Total | | | | 9 | 0 | 3 | 0 | 0 | 0 | 5 | 1 | 17 | 1 |
