= Delphine Cascarino =

French footballer (born 1997)

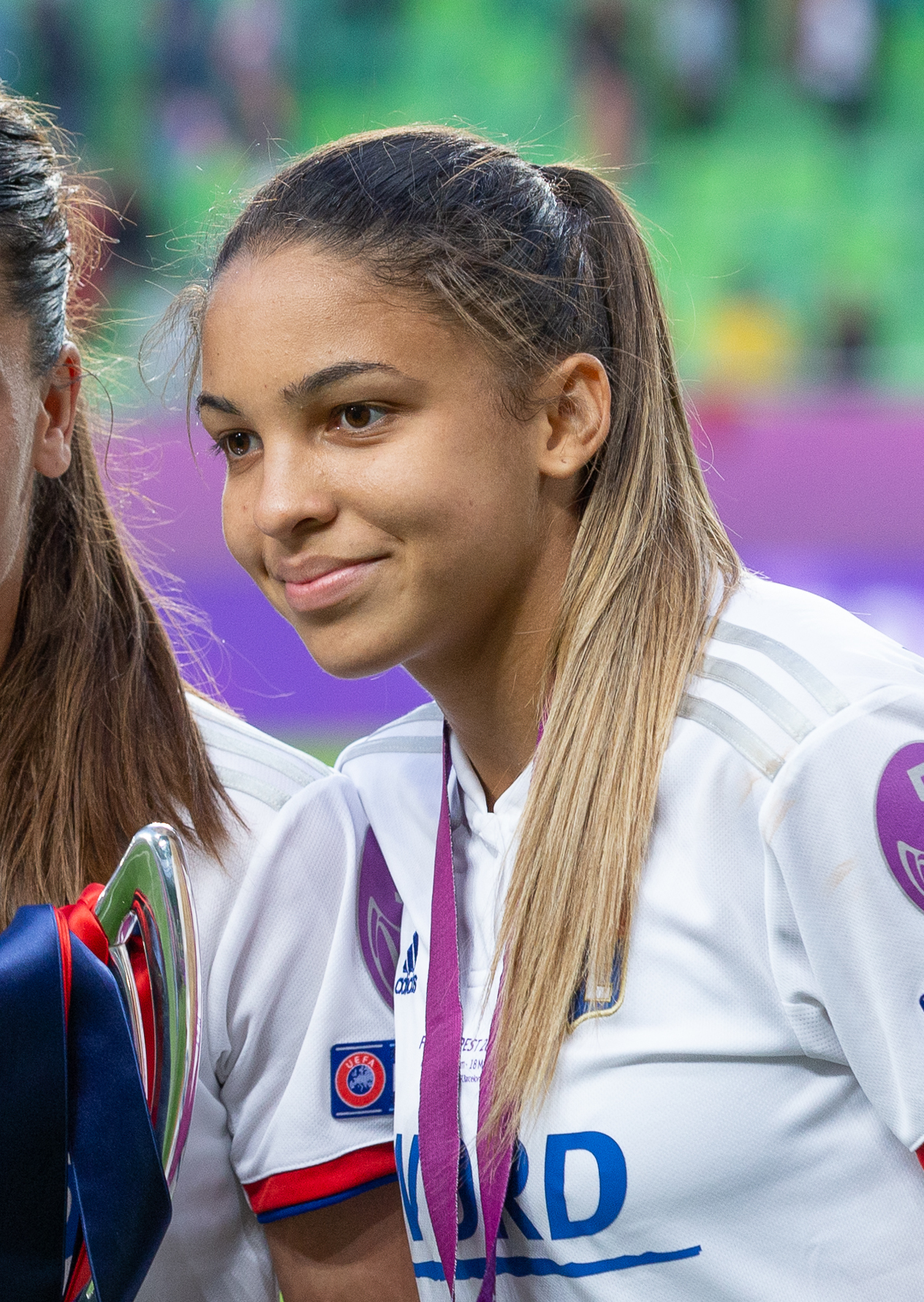
- Cascarino with Lyon in 2019

Personal information
- Date of birth: 5 February 1997 (age 29)
- Place of birth: Saint-Priest, France
- Height: 1.65 m (5 ft 5 in)
- Positions: Winger; forward

Team information
- Current team: London City Lionesses
- Number: 20

Youth career
- 2006–2007: AS Saint-Priest
- 2007–2009: AS Manissieux Saint-Priest
- 2009–2016: Lyon

Senior career*
Years	Team	Apps	(Gls)
2015–2024	Lyon	134	(20)
2024–2025	San Diego Wave	34	(7)
2026–	London City Lionesses	6	(0)

International career^{‡}
2012	France U16	5	(1)
2012–2013	France U17	17	(0)
2015–2016	France U19	23	(5)
2016	France U20	8	(2)
2018	France U23	4	(3)
2016–	France	86	(16)
Medal record
Women's football
Representing France
UEFA Women's Nations League
Runner-up	2024
Third place	2025
FIFA U-20 Women's World Cup
Runner-up	2016 Papua New Guinea
UEFA Women's Under-19 Championship
Winner	2016 Slovakia
FIFA U-17 Women's World Cup
Winner	2012 Azerbaijan
- * Club domestic league appearances and goals as of 4 September 2026 ‡ National team caps and goals as of 9 June 2026

Delphine Cascarino (born 5 February 1997) is a French professional footballer who plays as a winger or forward for Women's Super League club London City Lionesses and the France national team. She has previously played for Première Ligue club Lyon and San Diego Wave FC of the National Women's Soccer League.

== Club career ==
=== Lyon ===
Cascarino started playing football for her local youth teams of A.S. St. Priest and A.S. A.S. Manissieux St Priest before joining Lyon in 2009. She made her senior debut for Lyon in the Division 1 Féminine in the 2014–15 season. She was rewarded with her first professional contract in 2015. In January 2017, her season was ended early due to a knee injury. By 2018, she had won three UEFA Women's Champions League and three Division 1 titles with Olympic Lyonnais. On 7 May 2021, Cascarino extended her contract with Lyon through the club's 2023–24 season.

On 25 May 2023, Lyon announced that Cascarino would be sidelined for several months after rupturing an anterior cruciate ligament. She made her return to the field in January 2024 and later scored three goals across two UWCL quarterfinal matches as Lyon progressed to the final.

=== San Diego Wave ===
==== 2024 ====
On 24 July 2024, Cascarino joined National Women's Soccer League club San Diego Wave FC, signing a three-year contract with an additional option. She made her NWSL debut on 24 August, appearing as a substitute in a defeat to Angel City FC. On 15 September, Cascarino tallied her first goal and first assist with San Diego in a 2–1 victory over the Utah Royals.

==== 2025 ====
Cascarino started the following season on a positive note, tallying an assist in the Wave's opening match and subsequently being a nominee for the NWSL Player of the Week. Despite not winning the opening week accolade, she later received her first Player of the Week award after recording an assist and notching her first NWSL brace in a 4–1 win over Racing Louisville FC a month later. At the end of April, Cascarino was named to the NWSL Team of the Month for the first time.

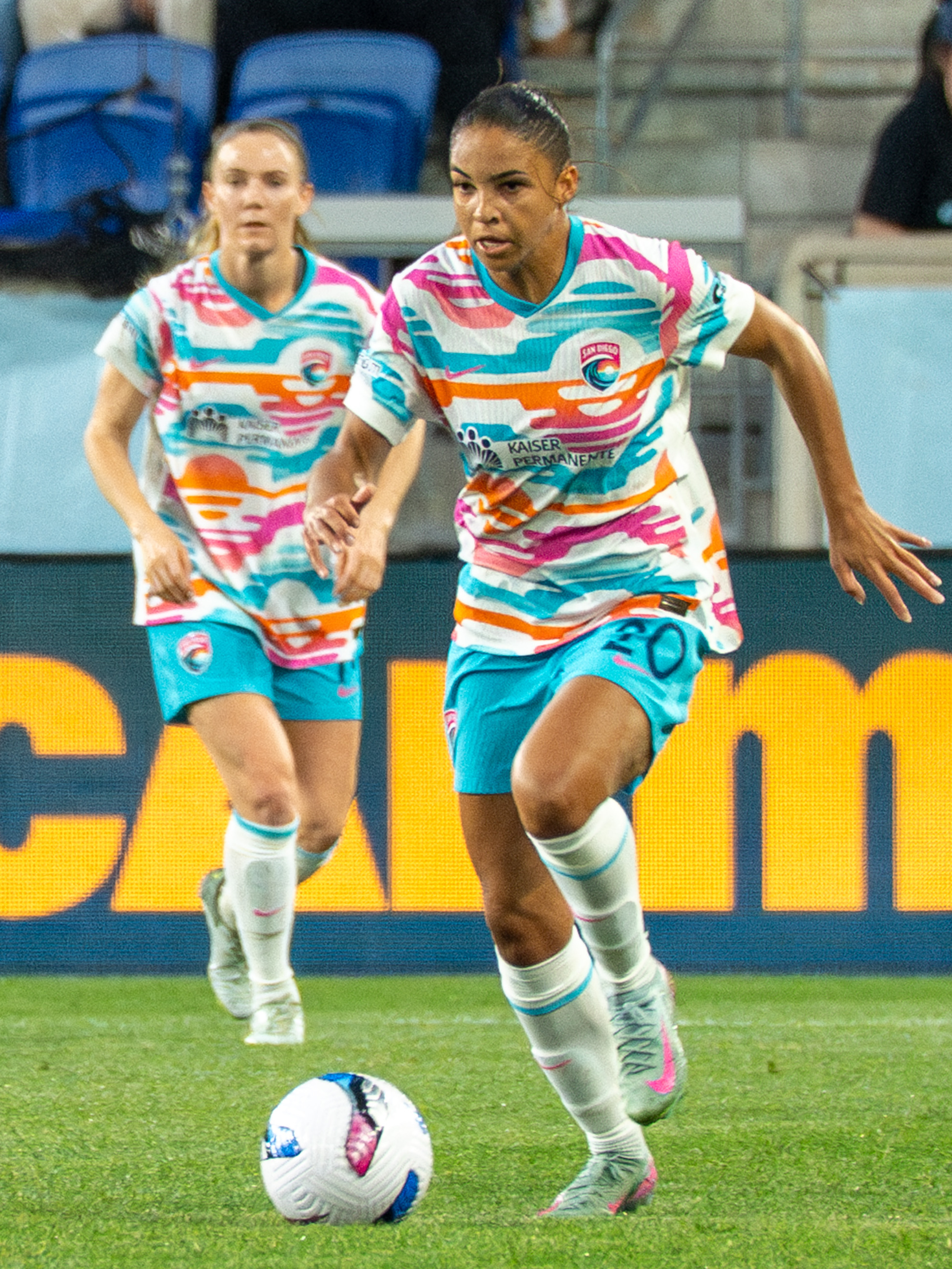
Cascarino with the San Diego Wave in 2025

She continued to be productive offensively in May, including during a 5–2 victory over the North Carolina Courage. Cascarino, who recorded an assist, helped contribute to the win, which set a club record for goals scored in a single match and extended San Diego's unbeaten streak to six games. Five months later, the Wave increased its single-game scoring record after putting 6 past Chicago Stars FC in the penultimate match of San Diego's 2025 season. Cascarino scored the opening goal in the 6–1 win as the Wave also clinched a spot in the playoffs with the victory. In San Diego's quarterfinal match, a 9 November away game at the Portland Thorns, Cascarino played 106 minutes of the eventual extra-time defeat.

Cascarino ended up recording 24 regular season appearances (23 starts) in her first full season with the Wave. Her 5 goals were tied for highest on San Diego, and her 6 assists (all of which were to different players) ranked at the top of the NWSL. Her efforts throughout 2025 earned her a nomination for NWSL Most Valuable Player, but the award was won instead by Temwa Chawinga. Cascarino was, however, named to the NWSL Second XI, alongside French teammate Kenza Dali. At the end of the season, Cascarino mutually terminated her contract with the Wave, citing a desire to be "closer to home" in the next stage of her career.

=== London City Lionesses ===
On 19 January 2026, Cascarino was announced to have signed a three-and-a-half-year contract with English Women's Super League club London City Lionesses. On 4 September 2026, she was in the starting line up for the opening match of the season against Manchester United, providing the assist for Daniëlle van de Donk's superb flick into goal, sealing the win for LCL.

== International career ==
In 2012, Cascarino was selected to play for the France women's national under-17 football team, where she was part of their 2012 FIFA U-17 Women's World Cup winning campaign. During the tournament, she played in all three of France's group stage games and recorded three assists in the team's match against Gambia. Cascarino also appeared in each of France's knockout matches and took successful spot-kicks in two penalty shootouts on the squad's road to victory. Her captain Sandie Toletti said of Cascarino: "It's a great discovery, knowing that she was not part of the last European championship. She is already a great player, despite her young age."

In 2016, Cascarino made her senior debut for France against England. She scored her first goal with the senior team on 10 November 2018, in a 3–1 win against Brazil. The following year, Cascarino was named to the French squad for the 2019 FIFA Women's World Cup. The team made it to the quarterfinals of the tournament before being eliminated by the United States.

On 30 May 2022, Cascarino was called up to the France squad for the UEFA Women's Euro 2022.

Cascarino was not able to participate in the 2023 FIFA Women's World Cup due to her ACL injury but was named in France's squad for the 2024 Olympics the very next year.

At the UEFA Women's Euro 2025, Cascarino was noted for her "immaculate" play by The Athletic.

== Personal life ==
Cascarino is the twin sister of Estelle Cascarino, also a football player, who played alongside her sister at Lyon before moving to Paris FC in 2016. They are not related to Tony Cascarino, although they are often asked if they are: "I am often asked if I am from his family, that is not the case ... I know that he notably played for Nancy and that he is Irish. Me, I'm not Irish at all! (laughs)" Her father is Italian and her mother comes from Guadeloupe.

== Career statistics ==
=== Club ===
As of 29 November 2025

Club	Season	League			Cup (Note: Includes the Coupe de France Féminine and the NWSL Challenge Cup)		Continental (Note: Includes the UEFA Women's Champions League and CONCACAF W Champions Cup)		Other		Total	
Club	Season	Division	Apps	Goals	Apps	Goals	Apps	Goals	Apps	Goals	Apps	Goals
Lyon	2014–15	Division 1 Féminine	2	0	1	1	0	0	—		3	1
Lyon	2015–16	Division 1 Féminine	12	3	3	4	3	0	—		18	7
Lyon	2016–17	Division 1 Féminine	6	0	1	2	2	1	—		9	3
Lyon	2017–18	Division 1 Féminine	19	2	6	4	8	1	—		33	7
Lyon	2018–19	Division 1 Féminine	18	3	3	1	8	2	—		29	6
Lyon	2019–20	Division 1 Féminine	16	3	4	1	7	1	1 (Note: Appearance(s) in the Trophée des Championnes)	0	28	5
Lyon	2020–21	Division 1 Féminine	21	2	1	0	5	0	—		27	2
Lyon	2021–22	Division 1 Féminine	18	3	2	0	12	0	—		32	3
Lyon	2022–23	Division 1 Féminine	17	4	4	1	7	1	1	0	29	6
Lyon	2023–24	Division 1 Féminine	5	0	3	0	5	3	0	0	13	3
Lyon	Total		134	20	28	14	57	9	2	0	221	43
San Diego Wave FC	2024	NWSL	10	2	0	0	3	0	0	0	13	2
San Diego Wave FC	2025	NWSL	24	5	—		—		1 (Note: Appearance(s) in the NWSL playoffs)	0	25	5
San Diego Wave FC	Total		34	7	0	0	3	0	1	0	38	7
Career total			168	27	28	14	60	9	3	0	259	50

=== International ===
As of match played 9 June 2026

Appearances and goals by national team and year
National team	Year	Apps	Goals
France	2016	1	0
France	2018	5	1
France	2019	16	4
France	2020	7	1
France	2021	7	2
France	2022	15	4
France	2023	5	2
France	2024	16	0
France	2025	11	2
France	2026	3	0
Total		86	16

Scores and results list France's goal tally first, score column indicates score after each Cascarino goal.

List of international goals scored by Delphine Cascarino
No.	Date	Venue	Opponent	Score	Result	Competition
1	10 November 2018	Allianz Riviera, Nice, France	Brazil	1–0	3–1	Friendly
2	8 April 2019	Stade de la Meinau, Strasbourg, France	Denmark	1–0	4–0	Friendly
3	8 April 2019	Stade de la Meinau, Strasbourg, France	Denmark	2–0	4–0	Friendly
4	31 August 2019	Stade Gabriel Montpied, Clermont-Ferrand, France	Spain	2–0	2–0	Friendly
5	4 October 2019	Stade des Costières, Nîmes, France	Iceland	3–0	4–0	Friendly
6	23 October 2020	Stade Gaston Gérard, Dijon, France	North Macedonia	9–0	11–0	2022 UEFA Women's Euro qualification
7	22 October 2021	Stade Dominique Duvauchelle, Créteil, France	Estonia	4–0	11–0	2023 FIFA Women's World Cup qualification
8	26 November 2021	Stade de la Rabine, Vannes, France	Kazakhstan	2–0	6–0	2023 FIFA Women's World Cup qualification
9	12 April 2022	MMArena, Le Mans, France	Slovenia	1–0	1–0	2023 FIFA Women's World Cup qualification
10	1 July 2022	Stade de la Source, Orléans, France	Vietnam	1–0	7–0	Friendly
11	10 July 2022	New York Stadium, Rotherham, England	Italy	3–0	5–1	UEFA Women's Euro 2022
12	2 September 2022	Lilleküla Stadium, Tallinn, Estonia	Estonia	1–0	9–0	2023 FIFA Women's World Cup qualification
13	7 April 2023	Stade Gabriel Montpied, Clermont-Ferrand, France	Colombia	1–2	5–2	Friendly
14	7 April 2023	Stade Gabriel Montpied, Clermont-Ferrand, France	Colombia	4–2	5–2	Friendly
15	13 July 2025	St. Jakob-Park, Basel, Switzerland	Netherlands	3–2	5–2	UEFA Women's Euro 2025
16	13 July 2025	St. Jakob-Park, Basel, Switzerland	Netherlands	4–2	5–2	UEFA Women's Euro 2025

== Honours ==
Lyon

- Première Ligue: 2014–15, 2015–16, 2016–17, 2017–18, 2018–19, 2019–20, 2021–22, 2022–23, 2023–24
- Coupe de France Féminine: 2014–15, 2015–16, 2016–17, 2018–19, 2019–20, 2022–23
- Trophée des Championnes: 2019, 2022
- UEFA Women's Champions League: 2015–16, 2016–17, 2017–18, 2018–19, 2019–20, 2021–22

France U17

- FIFA U-17 Women's World Cup: 2012

France U19

- UEFA Women's Under-19 Championship: 2016

France U20

- FIFA U-20 Women's World Cup runners-up: 2016

France

- UEFA Women's Nations League runners-up: 2023–24

Individual

- FIFA FIFPro Women's World11: 2020
- IFFHS Women's World Team: 2020
- UNFP Première Ligue player of the year: 2022–23
- UNFP Première Ligue team of the year: 2020–21, 2022–23, 2023–24
- LFFP Première Ligue team of the season: 2022–23
- Première Ligue Player of the Month: February 2023
- 2020 UEFA Women's Champions League final player of the match
- Gol do Torneio of the UEFA Women's Championship: 2025
