= Saki Kumagai =

Japanese footballer (born 1990)

Saki Kumagai 熊谷 紗希
- Kumagai in 2026

Personal information
- Date of birth: 17 October 1990 (age 36)
- Place of birth: Sapporo, Hokkaido, Japan
- Height: 1.73 m (5 ft 8 in)
- Positions: Defender; midfielder

Team information
- Current team: West Ham United
- Number: 8

Youth career
- 2006–2008: Tokiwagi Gakuen High School

Senior career*
Years	Team	Apps	(Gls)
2009–2011	Urawa Reds	44	(8)
2011–2013	Frankfurt	38	(2)
2013–2021	Lyon	152	(29)
2021–2023	Bayern Munich	39	(9)
2023–2025	AS Roma	37	(5)
2025–2026	London City Lionesses	28	(2)
2026–	West Ham United	8	(0)

International career^{‡}
2009	Japan U-19	5	(1)
2008–2010	Japan U-20	7	(0)
2008–	Japan	173	(4)
Medal record
Women's football
Representing Japan
Olympic Games
Silver medal – second place	2012 London	Team
FIFA Women's World Cup
Winner	2011 Germany
Runner-up	2015 Canada
AFC Women's Asian Cup
Winner	2018 Jordan
Winner	2026 Australia
Bronze medal – third place	2008 Vietnam
Bronze medal – third place	2010 China
Asian Games
Gold medal – first place	2010 Guangzhou	Team
AFC U-19 Women's Championship
Winner	2009 China
Runner-up	2007 China
- * Club domestic league appearances and goals as of 20:55, 8 November 2026 (UTC) ‡ National team caps and goals as of 02:36, 10 September 2026 (UTC)

Saki Kumagai (熊谷 紗希, Kumagai Saki; Japanese: [kɯ̟ːmaɡai saki]; born 17 October 1990) is a Japanese professional footballer who plays as a midfielder or defender for Women's Super League club West Ham United and the Japan national team. A versatile defensive midfielder with keen sense of anticipation and exceptional tactical acumen, she is also able to be deployed as a central defender. She is regarded as one of the finest Asian female midfielders of all time. She is one of the most successful East Asian footballers, of any gender, at club and international level.

Kumagai was born in Sapporo on 17 October 1990 and had ambitions to become a professional footballer from elementary school. Kumagai began her senior career in her native Japan with Urawa Reds in 2009. She would then move to Europe in 2011, joining Frauen-Bundesliga side FFC Frankfurt. She joined Olympique Lyonnais in the summer of 2013. Kumagai made over 240 appearances for the club, winning 19 titles trophies, including seven Division 1 Féminine titles, six Coupe de France titles, and five UEFA Women's Champions League titles. She was part of the squad that won 4 continental treble of Division 1 Féminine, Coupe de France, and UEFA Women's Champions League in 2015–16, 2016–17, 2018–19, and 2019–20. She left Lyon to join Bayern Munich in 2021. She won the league title with Bayern Munich in 2022–23 season before joining Serie A side AS Roma in the summer of 2023.

Kumagai has made over 100 caps for Japan women's national team and currently ranked as the 3rd most capped female player for the country. She made her senior international debut for Japan in 2008 at the age of 17. She had represented Japan in four World Cup tournaments, winning the 2011 FIFA Women's World Cup where she scored the decisive penalty in the penalty shootout. She had further won an Asian Games gold medal and the AFC Women's Asian Cup in 2014, 2018 and 2026. She was named captain of the national team in January 2017.

== Club career ==
=== Urawa Reds ===
After graduating from high school, she joined for Urawa Reds in 2009. The club won L.League championship in 2009 season.

=== Frankfurt ===
In July 2011, she moved to German Bundesliga club Frankfurt where she played for 2 seasons.

=== Lyon ===
Kumagai moved to French Division 1 Féminine club Lyon in June 2013, where she scored the decisive penalty for Lyon in the 2016 UEFA Champions League Final, following a player-of-the-match performance.

In April 2021, Kumagai announced that she would be leaving Lyon after 8 seasons.

=== Bayern Munich ===
On 12 May 2021, Kumagai would return to the Frauen Bundesliga when FC Bayern Munich announced her as their first signing of the season.

=== Roma ===
On 5 June 2023, it was announced that Kumagai had joined Serie A side AS Roma on a three-year deal.

=== London City Lionesses ===
On 23 January 2025, it was announced that Kumagai had signed for London City Lionesses.

=== West Ham United ===
On 4 September 2026, it was announced that Kumagai had signed for West Ham United.

== International career ==
On 7 March 2008, when Kumagai was 17 years old, she debuted for the Japan national team against Canada. In August, Kumagai was selected for the Japan U-20 national team at the 2008 U-20 World Cup. In 2010, she played for the U-20 team as captain during the 2010 U-20 World Cup. In 2011, she was part of Japan's World Cup-winning team, scoring the winning penalty in the final against the United States. She was also in the squad at the 2012 Summer Olympics and the 2015 World Cup. Japan came second at both competitions. In January 2017, she was named Japan's captain by manager Asako Takakura. In 2018, Japan won the 2018 Asian Cup. She has played more than 100 games for Japan. On 10 November 2019, Kumagai scored her first ever goal in a friendly match for Japan in a 2–0 win against South Africa.

On 18 June 2021, she was included in the Japan squad for the 2020 Summer Olympics.

On 7 January 2022, Kumagai was called up to the 2022 AFC Women's Asian Cup squad.

On 13 June 2023, she was included in the 23-player squad for the 2023 FIFA Women's World Cup.

On 14 June 2024, Kumagai was included in the Japan squad for the 2024 Summer Olympics.

Kumagai was part of the Japan squad that won the 2025 SheBelieves Cup and the 2026 AFC Women's Asian Cup.

== Career statistics ==
=== Club ===
As of match played 8 November 2026

Appearances and goals by club, season and competition
Club	Season	League			National cup (Note: includes Empress's Cup, Coupe de France, DFB Pokal)		League cup (Note: includes Nadeshiko League Cup)		Continental (Note: includes UEFA Women's Champions League)		Other		Total	
Club	Season	Division	Apps	Goals	Apps	Goals	Apps	Goals	Apps	Goals	Apps	Goals	Apps	Goals
Urawa Reds	2009	Nadeshiko League	21	2	4	1	0	0	—		—		25	3
Urawa Reds	2010	Nadeshiko League	18	6	4	2	2	0	—		—		24	8
Urawa Reds	2011	Nadeshiko League	5	0	0	0	0	0	—		—		5	0
Urawa Reds	Total		44	8	8	3	2	0	0	0	0	0	54	11
FFC Frankfurt	2011–12	Frauen-Bundesliga	20	2	3	0	—		8	0	—		31	2
FFC Frankfurt	2012–13	Frauen-Bundesliga	18	0	1	0	—		—		—		19	0
FFC Frankfurt	Total		38	2	4	0	0	0	8	0	0	0	50	2
Lyon	2013–14	D1 Féminine	19	3	5	3	—		4	1	—		28	7
Lyon	2014–15	D1 Féminine	22	2	6	0	—		4	0	—		32	2
Lyon	2015–16	D1 Féminine	20	5	5	1	—		9	1	—		34	7
Lyon	2016–17	D1 Féminine	19	6	2	2	—		9	3	—		30	11
Lyon	2017–18	D1 Féminine	21	5	4	0	—		7	1	—		32	6
Lyon	2018–19	D1 Féminine	20	2	5	0	—		9	0	—		34	2
Lyon	2019–20	D1 Féminine	14	2	6	0	—		6	1	1 (Note: Trophée des Championnes)	0	27	3
Lyon	2020–21	D1 Féminine	17	4	1	0	—		6	1	—		24	5
Lyon	Total		152	29	34	6	0	0	54	8	1	0	241	43
FC Bayern Munich	2021–22	Frauen-Bundesliga	21	5	4	1	—		8	2	—		33	8
FC Bayern Munich	2022–23	Frauen-Bundesliga	18	4	3	2	—		9	0	—		30	6
FC Bayern Munich	Total		39	9	7	3	0	0	17	2	0	0	63	14
A.S. Roma	2023–24	Serie A	25	5	5	0	—		8	0	1	0	39	5
A.S. Roma	2024–25	Serie A	12	0	1	1	—		8	1	1	0	22	2
A.S. Roma	Total		37	5	7	3	0	0	17	2	2	0	61	7
London City Lionesses	2024–25	Women's Championship	9	0	1	0	—		—		—		10	0
London City Lionesses	2025–26	Women's Super League	19	2	2	0	0	0	—		—		21	2
London City Lionesses	Total		28	2	3	0	0	0	0	0	0	0	31	2
West Ham United	2026–27	Women's Super League	8	0	0	0	3	0	—		—		11	0
Career total			346	53	63	13	5	0	87	11	3	0	511	79

=== International ===
As of match played 9 June 2026

Appearances and goals by national team and year
National Team	Year	Apps	Goals
Japan	2008	2	0
Japan	2009	0	0
Japan	2010	15	0
Japan	2011	16	0
Japan	2012	16	0
Japan	2013	9	0
Japan	2014	5	0
Japan	2015	11	0
Japan	2016	7	0
Japan	2017	9	0
Japan	2018	10	0
Japan	2019	10	1
Japan	2020	2	0
Japan	2021	8	0
Japan	2022	11	1
Japan	2023	16	0
Japan	2024	10	1
Japan	2025	7	0
Japan	2026	9	1
Total		173	4

Scores and results list Japan's goal tally first, score column indicates score after each Kumagai goal.

List of international goals scored by Saki Kumagai
No.	Date	Venue	Opponent	Score	Result	Competition
1	10 November 2019	Kitakyushu Stadium, Kitakyushu, Japan	South Africa	1–0	2–0	Friendly
2	24 January 2022	Shree Shiv Chhatrapati Sports Complex, Pune, India	Vietnam	2–0	3–0	2022 AFC Women's Asian Cup
3	29 July 2024	Parc des Princes, Paris, France	Brazil	1–1	2–1	2024 Summer Olympics
4	18 March 2026	Stadium Australia, Sydney, Australia	South Korea	3–0	4–1	2026 AFC Women's Asian Cup

== Honours ==
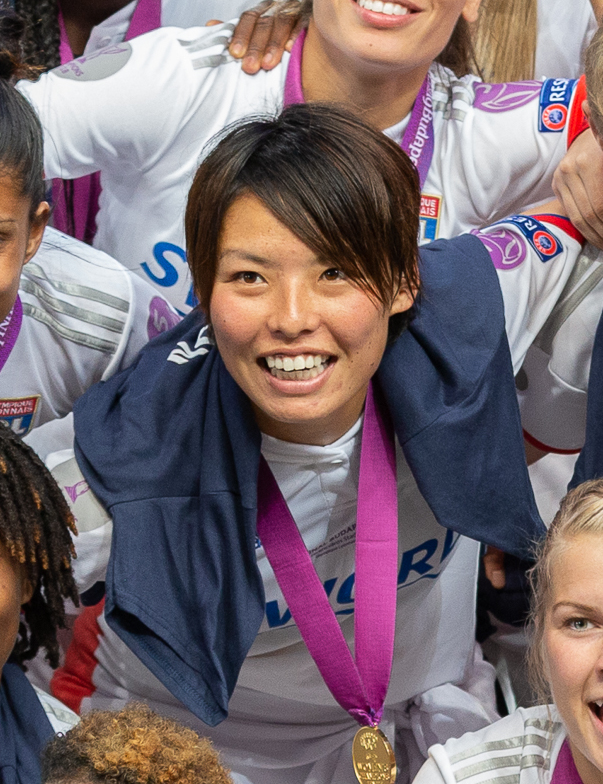
Saki Kumagai with Lyon in 2019.

Urawa Reds

- Nadeshiko League: 2009

Lyon

- Première Ligue: 2013–14, 2014–15, 2015–16, 2016–17, 2017–18, 2018–19, 2019–20
- Coupe de France: 2013–14, 2014–15, 2015–16, 2016–17, 2018–19, 2019–20
- UEFA Women's Champions League: 2015–16, 2016–17, 2017–18, 2018–19, 2019–20
- Trophée des Championnes: 2019

Bayern Munich

- Frauen-Bundesliga: 2022–23

AS Roma

- Serie A Femminile: 2023–24
- Coppa Italia (women): 2023–24
- Supercoppa Italiana (women): 2024

London City Lionesses

- Championship: 2024–25

Japan

- FIFA Women's World Cup - Winner: 2011, Runner-up: 2015
- Summer Olympics Silver Medal: 2012
- AFC Women's Asian Cup - Winner: 2018, 2026
- Asian Games - Winner: 2010
- East Asian Football Championship - Winner: 2010
- SheBelieves Cup - Winner: 2025

Japan U20

- AFC U-19 Women's Championship: 2009

Individual

- Asian Women's Footballer of the Year: 2019
- IFFHS Women's World Team: 2018, 2020
- IFFHS World's Woman Team of the Decade 2011–2020
- IFFHS AFC Woman Team of the Decade 2011–2020
- Women's Golden Foot: 2024

== See also ==
- List of women's footballers with 100 or more caps
