= Amandine Henry =

French footballer (born 1989)

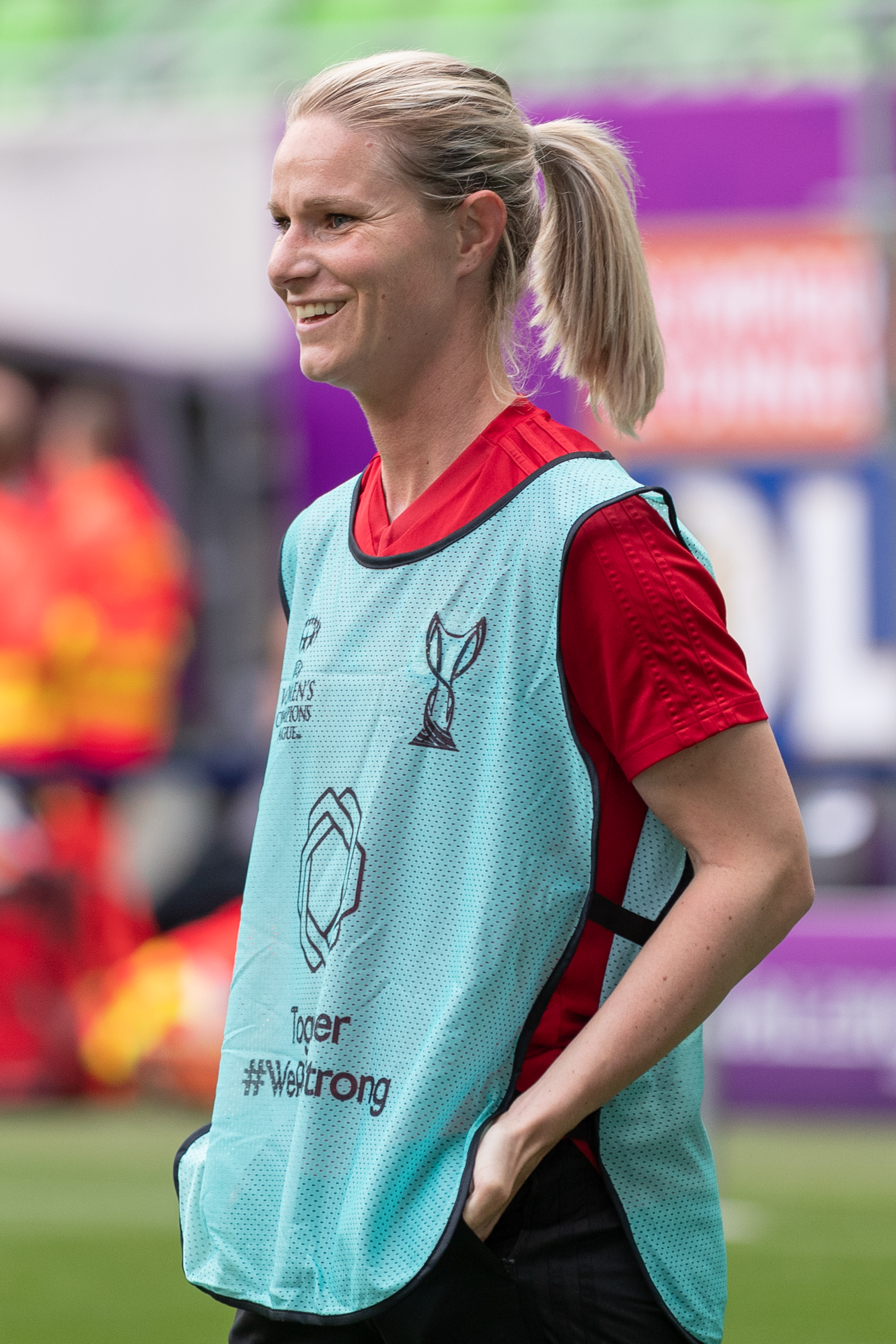
- Henry in 2019

Personal information
- Full name: Amandine Chantal Henry
- Date of birth: 28 September 1989 (age 37)
- Place of birth: Lille, France
- Height: 1.71 m (5 ft 7 in)
- Position: Defensive midfielder

Team information
- Current team: Toluca
- Number: 6

Youth career
- 1995–2000: OSM Lomme
- 2000–2004: Iris Club de Lambersart

Senior career*
Years	Team	Apps	(Gls)
2004–2005	Hénin-Beaumont	20	(11)
2005–2007	CNFE Clairefontaine	32	(22)
2007–2016	Lyon	132	(31)
2016–2017	Portland Thorns	33	(4)
2017	→ Paris Saint-Germain (loan)	4	(1)
2018–2023	Lyon	87	(19)
2023–2024	Angel City FC	9	(0)
2023–2024	→ Lille (loan)	2	(0)
2024	Utah Royals	11	(0)
2024–	Toluca	43	(10)

International career
2003–2005	France U17	14	(3)
2006–2007	France U19	18	(6)
2006	France U20	5	(1)
2009–2024	France	109	(14)
Medal record
Women's football
Representing France
UEFA Women's Nations League
Runner-up	2024
- * Club domestic league appearances and goals as of 31 January 2026

Amandine Chantal Henry (born 28 September 1989) is a French professional footballer who plays as a defensive midfielder for the Liga MX Femenil club Toluca.

Henry made her senior international debut for France in 2009 and captained the national team from October 2017 to 2020. At the 2015 FIFA Women's World Cup in Canada, she won the Silver Ball and was named to the tournament's All-Star Squad.

With Lyon, she has won 7 UEFA Women's Champions League finals, 13 league titles, and 8 French Cup championships. With the Portland Thorns, she won the 2016 NWSL Shield and 2017 league championship.

In 2022, Henry was nominated for the FIFA Puskás Award.

== Career ==
Henry began her career in 2004, at the age of 15, at Hénin-Beaumont. After one season, she attended the women's section of the Clairefontaine academy for two seasons.

=== Olympique Lyonnais, 2007–2016 ===
In 2007, at the age of 18, Henry joined Lyon, the most successful women's team in France. During her first season with Lyon, she injured the cartilage in her knee, which kept her out of competition for a year and a half. It was a difficult time, and she considered giving up on football, but with the support of her family, she persevered and returned to Lyon.

With Lyon, Henry was featured in the final match of the UEFA Women's Champions League in three consecutive seasons beginning in 2010.

=== Portland Thorns, 2016–17 ===
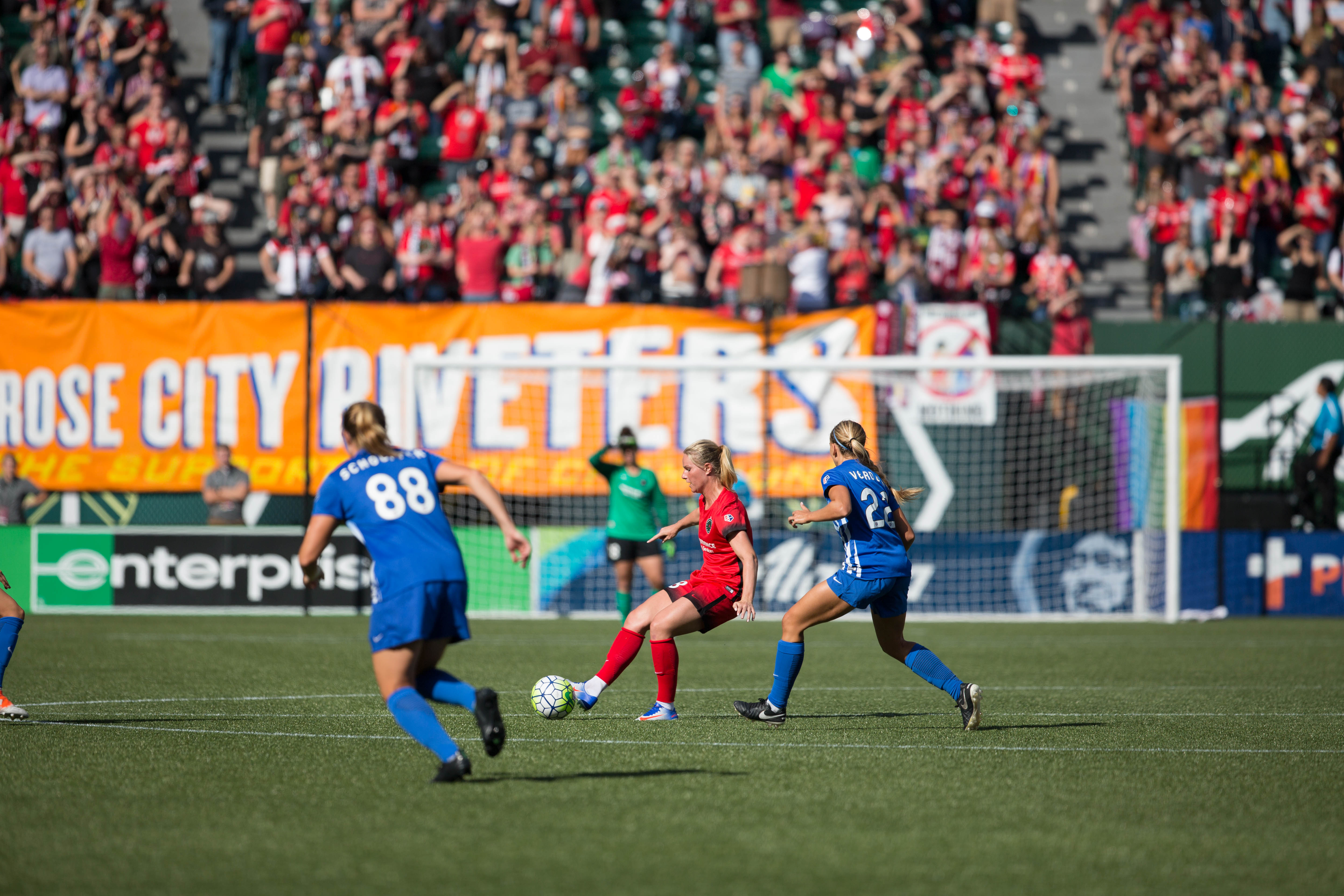
Henry playing for the Portland Thorns in 2016

Henry signed with the Portland Thorns in March 2016 and joined the team in June, where she played in 10 matches and started in 9 for the regular season-winning National Women's Soccer League team. She scored her first NWSL goal against Boston on 27 May. In May, she was named to the NWSL Team of the Month. She started in 12 consecutive games between April and July before departing for the UEFA Women's Euro 2017.

During the 2017 season, Henry returned to the Thorns to score in consecutive matches. First, she scored against Kansas City on 16 August, converting her first penalty kick for the Thorns. Then, she played 30 minutes as a substitute in the game against the Houston Dash on 19 August, scoring her third goal of the season.

The Thorns finished the 2017 season in second place, advancing to the playoffs where Henry scored the first goal against the third-place team Orlando Pride. Portland defeated Orlando 4–1. Henry became an NWSL champion when the Thorns defeated the regular-season winning team North Carolina Courage 1–0 in the 2017 NWSL Championship on 14 October 2017.

==== Paris Saint-Germain (loan), 2017 ====
After undergoing surgery following the 2016 NWSL season, Henry joined Paris Saint-Germain in January 2017 on a short-term loan. She played in four Division 1 matches and one Coupe de France Féminine match before rejoining the Thorns in March.

=== Olympique Lyonnais, 2017–23 ===
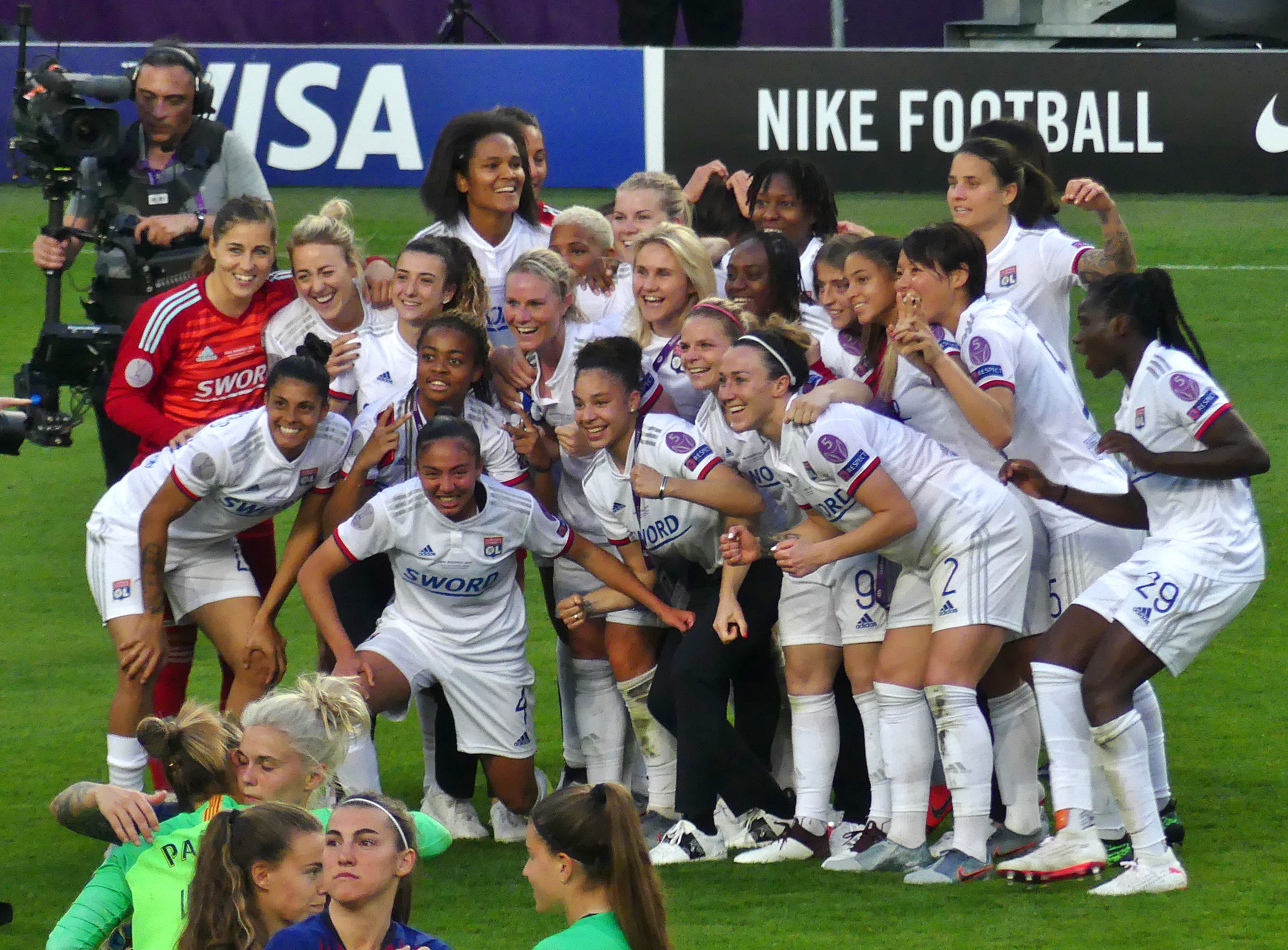
Henry celebrates winning the 2019 UEFA Women's Champions League final with her Lyon teammates, May 2019

After the 2017 NWSL season, Henry returned to Lyon for the remainder of the 2017–18 Division 1 Féminine season. She was nominated for the 2022 FIFA Puskás Award for best goal in January 2023, in recognition of her long-distance goal against FC Barcelona in the sixth minute of the 2022 UEFA Women's Champions League final.

Henry remained a regular starter with Lyon until suffering a lateral collateral ligament injury in her left knee during a Coupe de France semifinal match against Stade de Reims Féminines on 4 March 2023.

=== Angel City FC, 2023–2024 ===
On June 1, 2023, NWSL club Angel City FC of Los Angeles signed Henry to a three-year contract with an option for a fourth year. After recovering from the injury that kept her from the France World Cup Squad, Henry made her debut for Angel City on September 1, 2023, coming on as a substitute in a NWSL away match against Kansas City Current. Henry made her first start for Angel City on October 8, 2023 in a must win match against Houston Dash to keep the team in playoffs contention that finished as a 1–2 victory. She would go on to start the rest of the games that season, including the clubs first playoffs appearance against OL Reign on October 20, 2023 where the team was ultimately defeated 1–0.

==== Lille OSC (loan) 2023–24 ====
On November 16, 2023, it was announced that Henry would join Lille OSC on loan from Angel City during the NWSL offseason and would return to Los Angeles to join the team for preseason training in March 2024.

=== Utah Royals, 2024 ===
On April 20, 2024, Angel City FC announced that they had traded Henry to Utah Royals FC in exchange for $75,000 in allocation money.

=== Toluca, 2024–2025 ===
On September 10, 2024, Henry signed with the Liga MX Femenil club Toluca.

== International career ==
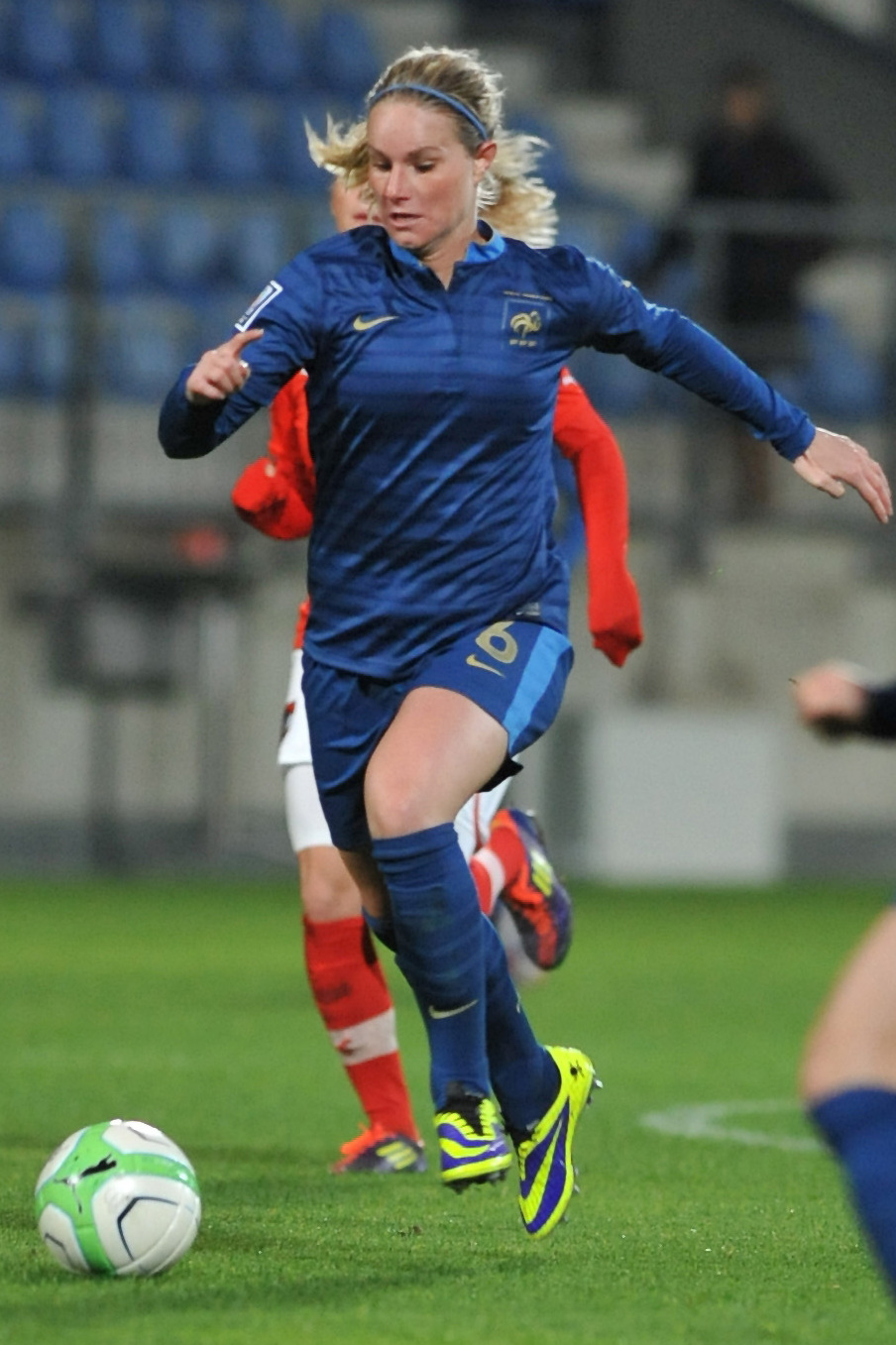
Henry playing for France in 2013

At the 2015 FIFA Women's World Cup in Canada, Henry earned the Silver Ball Award. Henry was named among the best players in Europe in 2015, becoming a finalist in the annual UEFA Best Women's Player in Europe Award, finishing second behind Célia Šašić.

During UEFA Women's Euro 2017, Henry started in all four games for France. France was ranked #3 in the world. France beat Iceland 1–0 on 18 July. On 22 July, Henry scored the goal that drew the game against Austria 1–1, and on 26 July, France drew Switzerland 1–1. This qualified France to advance to the quarter-finals where they lost to England 1–0 on 30 July. Henry received the player of the match award for the quarter-final match against England.

In May 2022, Henry was omitted from the French selection for UEFA Women's Euro 2022 by manager Corinne Diacre despite her form for Lyon in national and Champions League club play. This continued a trend since 2020 of Diacre omitting Henry from the selection. France Football writer Théo Troude considered the omission a "scandal" and indicative of Diacre's management style. In February 2023, Wendie Renard withdrew from the squad "to preserve (her) sanity", Kadidiatou Diani withdrew and called for "profound changes", and Marie Katoto suspended her international career while also calling for change. The French federation fired Diacre on 9 March 2023.

On 6 June 2023, the France women's national team manager Hervé Renard included Henry in the selection for the 2023 FIFA Women's World Cup. However, on 7 July 2023 the federation announced that Henry would be forced to withdraw due to an injury to her left calf.

On 13 August 2024, Henry announced her retirement from international football.

== Personal life ==
Henry was born in Lille and started playing football at the age of 5. There were no girls' teams for such young players, so she played with boys until she was 13 years old.

== Career statistics ==
=== Club ===
As of match played 13 April 2024

Club	Season	League			Cup		Continental		Other		Total	
Club	Season	Division	Apps	Goals	Apps	Goals	Apps	Goals	Apps	Goals	Apps	Goals
Hénin-Beaumont	2004–05		20	11	0	0	—				20	11
Hénin-Beaumont	Total		20	11	0	0	—				20	11
CNFE Clairefontaine	2005–06		16	11	—						16	11
CNFE Clairefontaine	2006–07		16	11	—						16	11
CNFE Clairefontaine	Total		32	22	—						32	22
Lyon	2007–08	D1 Féminine	4	0	0	0	2	1	—		6	1
Lyon	2008–09	D1 Féminine	7	1	4	1	1	0	—		12	2
Lyon	2009–10	D1 Féminine	10	2	3	1	6	0	—		19	3
Lyon	2010–11	D1 Féminine	18	5	3	1	9	0	—		30	6
Lyon	2011–12	D1 Féminine	21	8	6	0	7	1	—		29	7
Lyon	2012–13	D1 Féminine	20	5	6	4	8	3	—		34	12
Lyon	2013–14	D1 Féminine	20	3	2	0	3	0	—		26	4
Lyon	2014–15	D1 Féminine	19	1	5	1	4	0	—		28	2
Lyon	2015–16	D1 Féminine	13	6	1	0	5	0	—		19	6
Lyon	Total		132	31	30	8	45	5	—		207	39
Portland	2016	NWSL	10	0	—						10	0
Portland	2017	NWSL	23	4	—						23	4
Portland	Total		33	4	—						33	4
PSG (loan)	2016–17	D1 Féminine	4	1	1	1	—				5	2
PSG (loan)	Total		4	1	1	1	—				5	2
Lyon	2017–18	D1 Féminine	7	3	5	1	5	1	—		17	5
Lyon	2018–19	D1 Féminine	18	4	5	2	8	2	—		31	8
Lyon	2019–20	D1 Féminine	15	4	5	0	3	1	1 (Note: Appearances in Trophée des Championnes)	0	24	5
Lyon	2020–21	D1 Féminine	19	6	1	0	5	0	—		25	6
Lyon	2021–22	D1 Féminine	18	1	0	0	13	3	—		31	4
Lyon	2022–23	D1 Féminine	10	1	1	0	4	0	0	0	15	1
Lyon	Total		87	19	17	3	38	7	1	0	143	29
Angel City FC	2023	NWSL	5	0	0	0	0	0	1	0	6	0
Angel City FC	2024	NWSL	4	0	—		—		—		4	0
Angel City FC	Total		9	0	0	0	0	0	1	0	10	0
Lille (loan)	2023–24	D1 Féminine	2	0	—		—		—		2	0
Utah Royals	2024	NWSL	0	0	—		—		—		0	0
Career total			319	88	48	12	83	12	2	0	452	112

=== International ===
As of 10 March 2020

National team	Season	Apps	Goals
France	2008–09	6	0
France	2009–10	6	1
France	2010–11	0	0
France	2011–12	0	0
France	2012–13	7	1
France	2013–14	13	1
France	2014–15	16	3
France	2015–16	8	0
France	2016–17	13	3
France	2017–18	9	2
France	2018–19	11	2
France	2019–20	3	0
Total		92	13

==== International goals ====
As of 7 June 2019

#	Date	Venue	Opponent	Score	Result	Competition
1	5 May 2010	Stadion Rankhof, Basel, Switzerland	Switzerland	0–1	0–2	Friendly
2	31 October 2013	Sonnensee Stadion, Ritzing, Austria	Austria	0–2	1–3	2015 FIFA Women's World Cup qualification
3	20 June 2014	Rentschler Field, Hartford, United States	United States	1–2	2–2	Friendly
4	17 June 2015	Lansdowne Stadium, Ottawa, Canada	Mexico	0–5	0–5	2015 FIFA Women's World Cup
5	19 September 2015	Stade Océane, Le Havre, France	Brazil	2–0	2–1	Friendly
6	1 December 2015	Katerini Stadium, Katerini, Greece	Greece	0–1	0–3	UEFA Women's Euro 2017 qualifying
7	22 July 2017	Stadion Galgenwaard, Utrecht, Netherlands	Austria	1–1	1–1	UEFA Women's Euro 2017
8	23 October 2017	Stade Auguste Delaune, Reims, France	Ghana	2–0	8–0	Friendly
9	23 October 2017	Stade Auguste Delaune, Reims, France	Ghana	3–0	8–0	Friendly
10	20 January 2018	Stade Vélodrome, Marseille, France	Italy	1–1	1–1	Friendly
11	7 March 2018	Exploria Stadium, Orlando, United States	Germany	1–0	3–0	2018 SheBelieves Cup
12	7 June 2019	Parc des princes, Paris, France	South Korea	4–0	4–0	2019 FIFA Women's World Cup
13	23 June 2019	Stade Océane, Le Havre, France	Brazil	2–1	2–1	2019 FIFA Women's World Cup
14	5 December 2023	Roazhon Park, Rennes, France	Austria	1–0	3–0	2023–24 UEFA Women's Nations League

== Honours ==
Lyon

- Division 1 Féminine: 2007–08, 2008–09, 2009–10, 2010–11, 2011–12, 2012–13, 2013–14, 2014–15, 2015–16, 2017–18, 2018–19, 2019–20, 2021–22
- Coupe de France Féminine: 2007–08, 2011–12, 2012–13, 2013–14, 2014–15, 2015–16, 2018–19, 2019–20
- UEFA Women's Champions League: 2010–11, 2011–12, 2015–16, 2017–18, 2018–19, 2019–20, 2021–22

Portland Thorns

- NWSL Championship: 2017
- NWSL Shield: 2016

France

- Cyprus Cup: 2014
- SheBelieves Cup: 2017

Individual

- FIFA Women's World Cup Silver Ball: 2015
- FIFA Women's World Cup All-Star Team: 2015
- FIFPro: FIFA FIFPro World XI 2015
- IFFHS Women's World Team: 2018, 2019
- IFFHS UEFA Woman Team of the Decade 2011–2020
- FIFA Puskás Award: 2022 nominee

== See also ==
- The 100 Best Female Footballers in the World
- List of women's footballers with 100 or more international caps
- List of UEFA Women's Championship goalscorers
- List of France women's international footballers
- List of UEFA Women's Cup and UEFA Women's Champions League records and statistics
