= Sara Björk Gunnarsdóttir =

Icelandic footballer (born 1990)

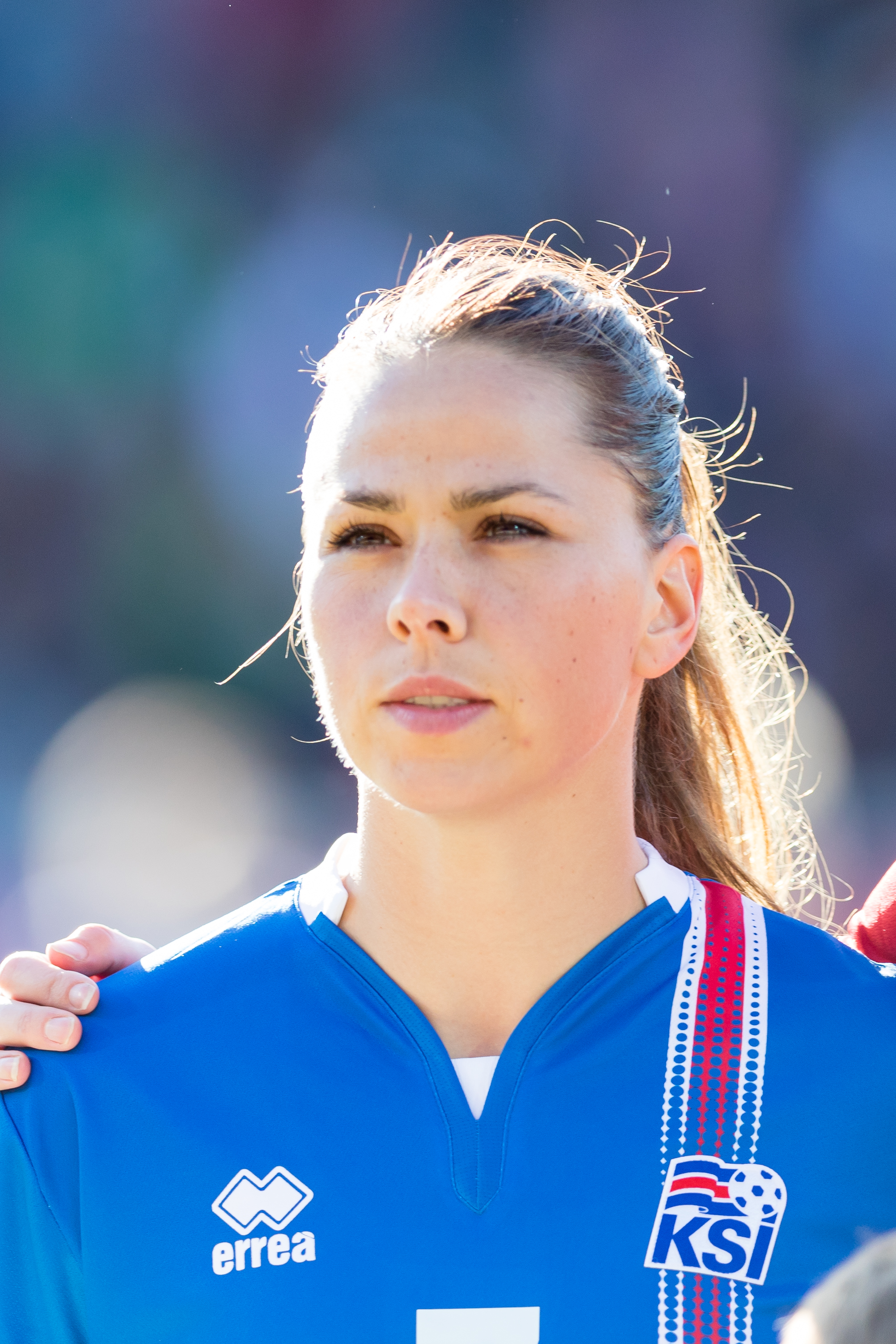
- Sara Björk in October 2017

Personal information
- Full name: Sara Björk Gunnarsdóttir
- Date of birth: 29 September 1990 (age 36)
- Place of birth: Iceland
- Position: Midfielder

Team information
- Current team: Al Qadsiah
- Number: 7

Senior career*
Years	Team	Apps	(Gls)
2004–2008	Haukar	0	(0)
2008–2010	Breiðablik	41	(17)
2011–2016	FC Rosengård	111	(34)
2016–2020	VfL Wolfsburg	68	(12)
2020–2022	Olympique Lyonnais	17	(3)
2022–2024	Juventus	34	
2024–	Al Qadsiah		

International career^{‡}
2007	Iceland U17	4	(0)
2007–2008	Iceland U19	13	(4)
2007–2023	Iceland	145	(24)
- * Club domestic league appearances and goals as of 17:21, 19 March 2023 (UTC) ‡ National team caps and goals as of 18:12, 24 February 2023 (UTC)

Sara Björk Gunnarsdóttir (born 29 September 1990) is an Icelandic professional footballer who plays as a midfielder for Saudi Women's Premier League club Al Qadsiah.

Sara Björk was part of the Iceland women's national football team from 2007 to 2022 and represented her country at the 2009, 2013, 2017, and 2022 editions of the UEFA Women's Championship. She is the only woman to have been named the Icelandic Sportsperson of the Year twice, in 2018 and 2020. In August 2020, she became the first Icelander to win the UEFA Women's Champions League.

== Club career ==
Sara Björk joined local team Haukar at the age of six and remained until she was 18.

=== FC Malmö ===
After three subsequent seasons with Breiðablik, she left Iceland in 2011, to sign a three-year professional contract with Swedish club LdB FC Malmö. She was an immediate success in Sweden, contributing 12 goals as Malmö won the Damallsvenskan title. In August 2013 she announced the extension of her Malmö contract for another two and a half seasons via Twitter.

=== VfL Wolfsburg ===
In May 2016, Sara Björk announced that she would not extend her contract with Malmö (now known as FC Rosengård) and planned to leave Sweden after winning four Damallsvenskan titles in five years. At that stage she did not confirm speculation that she was heading for German club VfL Wolfsburg. Shortly afterwards the transfer to Wolfsburg was made official, ahead of their 2016–17 season. In her four seasons with Wolfsburg, the club won the Frauen-Bundesliga and the German Cup each year.

=== Olympique Lyonnais ===
On 1 July 2020, she joined Olympique Lyonnais. On 9 August, she won her first title with the club when it defeated Paris Saint-Germain in the Coupe de France after penalties. On 30 August, she scored one goal in Olympique Lyonnais' 3–1 win against her former club, Wolfsburg, in the UEFA Women's Champions League final.

In December 2020, Sara was named the Icelandic Sportsperson of the Year, becoming the first woman to win it twice. In April 2021, she announced that she was pregnant with her first child. She returned to the pitch in March 2022. In May the same year, she confirmed that she would leave Lyon at the end of the season.

=== Juventus ===
On 1 July 2022, Sara joined Juventus. She achieved the 2022–23 Coppa Italia with her club following a 1–0 win over Roma in the final.

=== Al Qadsiah ===
On 3 August 2024, Sara signed for Saudi Women's Premier League side Al Qadsiah.

== International career ==
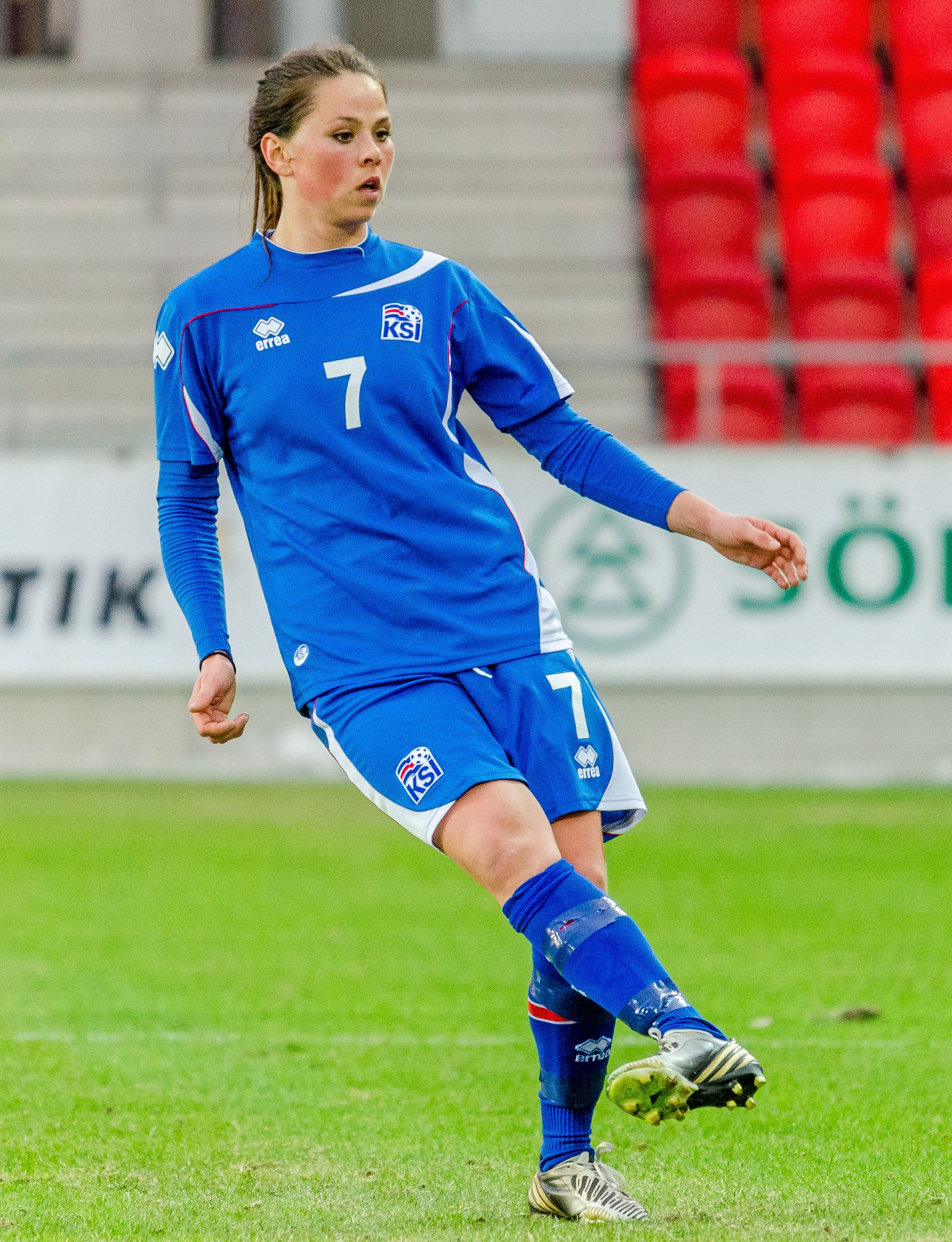
Sara Björk playing an international friendly against Sweden at Myresjöhus Arena in Växjö, 6 April 2013

Sara Björk was included in Iceland's senior national squad in August 2007, aged 16. She had recovered from an anterior cruciate ligament injury after having to delay surgery because she was too young and her bones were not yet fused.

Still a month short of her 17th birthday, she made her national team debut in a UEFA Women's Euro 2009 qualifying match versus Slovenia in Dravograd. Sara Björk substituted in for Katrín Ómarsdóttir on 87 minutes.

Sara Björk scored twice in Iceland's 3–1 win over Norway at the 2009 Algarve Cup and was selected in the squad for the UEFA Women's Euro 2009 finals in Finland. She played in all three group matches as Iceland were eliminated in the first round.

Women's national team coach Siggi Eyjólfsson selected Sara Björk in the Iceland squad for UEFA Women's Euro 2013, where she played in all four matches including the 4–0 quarter-final defeat to hosts Sweden.

With Margrét Lára Viðarsdóttir on maternity leave, incoming national coach Freyr Alexandersson appointed Sara Björk as Iceland's new team captain in 2014.

Sara Björk limped out of the 2018 UEFA Women's Champions League Final with an injury. She was ruled out of Iceland's match with Slovenia in June 2018, which was the first national team fixture she had missed since 2009.

On 13 January 2023, she announced her retirement from the Icelandic national team.

== Personal life ==
Sara Björk is married to fellow footballer Árni Vilhjálmsson; the couple have a son together.

In January 2023, Sara Björk wrote an article in the Player's Tribune publicizing Lyon's neglect of maternal care for her while she was pregnant and postpartum, including failure to properly pay her.

== Career statistics ==
=== Club ===
As of match played 11 March 2023

Appearances and goals by club, season and competition
Club	Season	League			National cup (Note: Includes Icelandic Cup, Svenska Cupen Damer, DFB-Pokal Frauen, Coupe de France Féminine)		League cup (Note: Includes Icelandic League Cup)		Continental (Note: All appearances in UEFA Women's Champions League)		Other		Total	
Club	Season	Division	Apps	Goals	Apps	Goals	Apps	Goals	Apps	Goals	Apps	Goals	Apps	Goals
Haukar	2004	Besta deild kvenna	0	0	0	0	3	0	—		—		3	0
Haukar	2007	Besta deild kvenna	0	0	1	0	11	13	—		—		12	13
Haukar	2008	Besta deild kvenna	0	0	0	0	8	5	—		—		8	5
Haukar	Total		0	0	1	0	22	18	—		—		23	18
Breiðablik	2008	Besta deild kvenna	6	4	1	1	—		—		—		7	5
Breiðablik	2009	Besta deild kvenna	17	7	3	0	0	0	—		—		20	7
Breiðablik	2010	Besta deild kvenna	18	6	1	0	0	0	5	3	—		24	9
Breiðablik	Total		41	17	5	1	0	0	5	3	—		51	21
FC Rosengård	2011	Damallsvenskan	21	12	2	0	—		6	5	1 (Note: Appearance in Svenska Supercupen)	0	30	17
FC Rosengård	2012	Damallsvenskan	20	4	3	0	—		5	1	1	0	29	5
FC Rosengård	2013	Damallsvenskan	20	8	2	1	—		4	1	—		26	10
FC Rosengård	2014	Damallsvenskan	19	2	3	1	—		6	1	—		28	4
FC Rosengård	2015	Damallsvenskan	21	7	1	0	—		6	2	1	0	29	9
FC Rosengård	2016	Damallsvenskan	10	1	3	2	—		—		1	0	14	3
FC Rosengård	Total		111	34	14	4	—		27	10	4	0	156	48
Vfl Wolfsburg	2016–17	Frauen-Bundesliga	17	1	4	0	—		6	1	—		27	2
Vfl Wolfsburg	2017–18	Frauen-Bundesliga	19	4	4	2	—		9	6	—		32	12
Vfl Wolfsburg	2018–19	Frauen-Bundesliga	16	2	4	2	—		5	0	—		25	4
Vfl Wolfsburg	2019–20	Frauen-Bundesliga	16	5	3	1	—		3	1	—		22	7
Vfl Wolfsburg	Total		68	12	15	5	—		23	8	—		106	25
Olympique Lyonnais	2019–20	D1 Féminine	—		—		—		3 (Note: 2019-20 UEFA Women's Champions League was postponed due to ongoing COVID 19 pandemic before being restarted in August 2020. Sara Björk Gunnarsdóttir was transferred to Olympique Lyonnais in July 2020.)	1	—		3	1
Olympique Lyonnais	2020–21	D1 Féminine	12	3	1	0	—		4	0	—		17	3
Olympique Lyonnais	2021–22	D1 Féminine	5	0	0	0	—		1	0	—		6	0
Olympique Lyonnais	Total		17	3	1	0	—		8	1	—		26	4
Juventus	2022–23	Serie A	10	1	3	1	—		6	1	1 (Note: Appearance in Supercoppa Italiana)	0	20	3
Career total			247	67	39	11	19	18	69	23	4	0	382	119

=== International ===
As of match played 12 October 2022

Appearances and goals by national team and year
National team	Year	Apps	Goals
Iceland	2007	1	0
Iceland	2008	12	3
Iceland	2009	11	3
Iceland	2010	10	3
Iceland	2011	9	1
Iceland	2012	11	2
Iceland	2013	12	2
Iceland	2014	12	1
Iceland	2015	9	0
Iceland	2016	11	1
Iceland	2017	14	1
Iceland	2018	8	0
Iceland	2019	9	1
Iceland	2020	7	2
Iceland	2022	9	2
Total		145	22

Scores and results list Iceland's goal tally first, score column indicates score after each Gunnarsdóttir goal.

List of international goals scored by Sara Björk Gunnarsdóttir
No.	Date	Venue	Opponent	Score	Result	Competition	Ref.
1	7 March 2008	Municipal Stadium, Lagos, Portugal	Republic of Ireland	3–0	4–1	2008 Algarve Cup	
2	28 May 2008	Čika Dača Stadium, Kragujevac, Serbia	Serbia	2–0	4–0	UEFA Women's Euro 2009 qualifying	
3	26 June 2008	Laugardalsvöllur, Reykjavík, Iceland	Greece	1–0	7–0	UEFA Women's Euro 2009 qualifying	
4	4 March 2009	Estádio José Arcanjo, Olhão, Portugal	Norway	1–0	3–1	2009 Algarve Cup	
5	4 March 2009	Estádio José Arcanjo, Olhão, Portugal	Norway	2–1	3–1	2009 Algarve Cup	
6	17 September 2009	Laugardalsvöllur, Reykjavík, Iceland	Estonia	9–0	12–0	2011 FIFA Women's World Cup qualification	
7	19 June 2010	Laugardalsvöllur, Reykjavík, Iceland	Northern Ireland	1–0	2–0	2011 FIFA Women's World Cup qualification	
8	25 August 2010	Rakvere Linnastaadion, Rakvere, Estonia	Estonia	3–0	5–0	2011 FIFA Women's World Cup qualification	
9	25 August 2010	Rakvere Linnastaadion, Rakvere, Estonia	Estonia	5–0	5–0	2011 FIFA Women's World Cup qualification	
10	19 May 2011	Laugardalsvöllur, Reykjavík, Iceland	Bulgaria	2–0	6–0	UEFA Women's Euro 2013 qualifying	
11	21 June 2012	Lovech Stadium, Lovech, Bulgaria	Bulgaria	2–0	10–0	UEFA Women's Euro 2013 qualifying	
12	21 June 2012	Lovech Stadium, Lovech, Bulgaria	Bulgaria	10–0	10–0	UEFA Women's Euro 2013 qualifying	
13	13 March 2013	Bela Vista Municipal Stadium, Parchal, Portugal	Hungary	1–0	4–1	2013 Algarve Cup	
14	1 June 2013	Laugardalsvöllur, Reykjavík, Iceland	Scotland	1–2	2–3	Friendly	
15	13 September 2014	Laugardalsvöllur, Reykjavík, Iceland	Israel	3–0	3–0	2015 FIFA Women's World Cup qualification	
16	7 June 2016	Laugardalsvöllur, Reykjavík, Iceland	North Macedonia	4–0	8–0	UEFA Women's Euro 2017 qualifying	
17	18 September 2017	Laugardalsvöllur, Reykjavík, Iceland	Faroe Islands	4–0	8–0	2019 FIFA Women's World Cup qualification	
18	4 March 2019	Bela Vista Municipal Stadium, Parchal, Portugal	Scotland	1–3	1–4	2019 Algarve Cup	
19	26 November 2020	NTC Senec, Senec, Slovakia	Slovakia	2–1	3–1	UEFA Women's Euro 2022 qualifying	
20	26 November 2020	NTC Senec, Senec, Slovakia	Slovakia	3–1	3–1	UEFA Women's Euro 2022 qualifying	
21	2 September 2022	Laugardalsvöllur, Reykjavík, Iceland	Belarus	1–0	6–0	2023 FIFA Women's World Cup qualification	
22	2 September 2022	Laugardalsvöllur, Reykjavík, Iceland	Belarus	2–0	6–0	2023 FIFA Women's World Cup qualification	

== Honours ==
Rosengård

- Damallsvenskan: 2011, 2013, 2014, 2015
- Svenska Cupen: 2015–16
- Svenska Supercupen: 2011, 2012, 2015, 2016

VfL Wolfsburg

- Bundesliga: 2016–17, 2017–18, 2018–19, 2019–20
- DFB-Pokal: 2016–17, 2017–18, 2018–19, 2019–20

Olympique Lyonnais

- Division 1 Féminine: 2021–22
- Coupe de France: 2019–20
- UEFA Women's Champions League: 2019–20, 2021–22

Juventus

- Coppa Italia: 2022–23

Individual

- Sport Person of the Year in Haukar in 2008
- Icelandic Women's Footballer of the Year: 2013, 2015, 2016, 2017, 2018, 2019, 2020
- Icelandic Sportsperson of the Year: 2018, 2020
