= Lisa Weiß =

German footballer (born 1987)

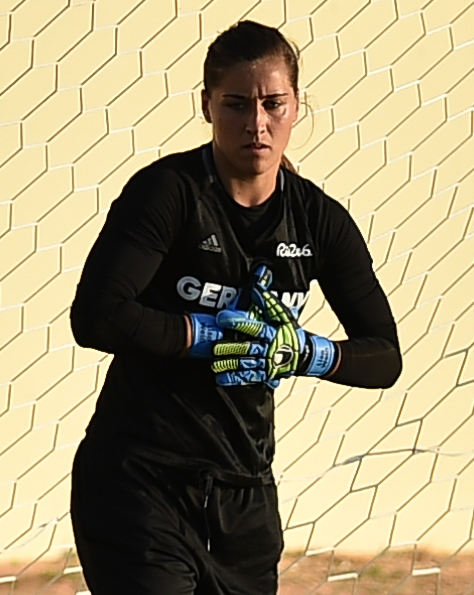
- Weiß in 2016

Personal information
- Full name: Lisa Weiß
- Date of birth: 29 October 1987 (age 39)
- Place of birth: Düsseldorf, West Germany
- Height: 1.71 m (5 ft 7 in)
- Position: Goalkeeper

Youth career
- SV Lohausen

Senior career*
Years	Team	Apps	(Gls)
–2006	SV Lohausen		
2006–2007	FCR 2001 Duisburg	0	(0)
2007–2018	SGS Essen	187	(0)
2018–2020	Lyon	4	(0)
2020–2021	Aston Villa	21	(0)
2021–2023	VfL Wolfsburg	7	(0)

International career^{‡}
2010–2017	Germany	4	(0)
Medal record
Women's football
Representing Germany
UEFA Women's Championship
Gold medal – first place	2009 Finland	Team
- * Club domestic league appearances and goals as of 16 March 2022 ‡ National team caps and goals as of 7 March 2017

Lisa Weiß (born 29 October 1987) is a German former footballer who played as a goalkeeper for the Germany national team.

== Career ==
Weiß began her career with the Düsseldorf district club Lohausener SV. In 2006 she moved to the Bundesliga club FCR 2001 Duisburg. After just one year, she switched to SG Essen-Schoenebeck, which has been operating as SGS Essen since the 2012/13 season. On 7 October 2007 (3rd matchday) she made her Bundesliga debut in a 1-1 home draw against 1. FFC Turbine Potsdam. After 187 Bundesliga games, Weiß said goodbye to Essen on 30 May 2018 and signed for the 2018/19 season with Champions League winners Lyon. For the 2020/21 season, Weiß moved to the English league to promoted Aston Villa and signed a two-year contract there. After just one season, she returned to Germany and played in five league games in the 2021/22 season for VfL Wolfsburg, with whom she won the German championship.

On 25 February 2023, her club VfL Wolfsburg announced that Weiß would not renew her contract after the current season and would retire.

== International career ==
On 22 May 2008, she made her debut for the U23 national team, which lost 1-0 to the United States. A short time later, White was included in the preparation squad for the 2008 Olympic football tournament by national coach Silvia Neid. In 2009 she was named to the squad for the European Championship, but did not play in this. On 26 May 2010, she also played her sixth and last international match in this age group against the U-23 selection of the Americans.

Weiß made her senior international debut for Germany on 17 February 2010, as a 17th minute substitute for the injured Nadine Angerer in a 3–0 friendly victory over North Korea.

At the end of the year in football, she was part of the squad for the senior national team that beat England 3-0 in London on 23 November 2014.

In 2016 and 2017 she played three more international matches. She was part of the squad at the 2017 European Championships but was not used.

== Honours ==
FCR 2001 Duisburg

- Bundesliga: Runner-up 2006–07
- German Cup: Runner-up 2006–07

Lyon

- French Champions: 2019, 2020
- French Cup: 2019, 2020
- UEFA Women's Champions League: 2018–19

VfL Wolfsburg

- Bundesliga: 2022
- German Cup: 2022, 2023

Germany

- European Championship: Winner 2009
