= 2021–22 Olympique Lyonnais Féminin season =

Olympique Lyonnais Féminin
2021–22 season
- Manager: Sonia Bompastor
- Stadium: Groupama OL Training Center
- Division 1: Champions
- Coupe de France: Round of 16 vs Paris Saint-Germain
- UEFA Champions League: Champions
- Top goalscorer: League: Catarina Macario (14); All: Catarina Macario (23)
Home colours	Away colours	Third colours

The 2021–22 Olympique Lyonnais Féminin season was the club's eighteenth season since FC Lyon joined OL as its women's section. Olympique Lyonnais finished the season as Champions of the Division 1 Féminine and UEFA Women's Champions League, whilst they were knocked out of the Coupe de France Féminine by Paris Saint-Germain at the Round of 16 stage.

== Season events ==
On 21 June, Olympique Lyonnais announced the signings of Christiane Endler to a three-year contract, and Daniëlle van de Donk and Signe Bruun to two-year contracts.

On 23 June, Olympique Lyonnais announced the signing of Perle Morroni from Paris Saint-Germain on a contract until 30 June 2024.

On 2 July, Olympique Lyonnais sold Nikita Parris to Arsenal for €80,000, with another €20,000 in addons.

On 13 August, Olympique Lyonnais announced the signing of Emma Holmgren from Eskilstuna United on a contract until 30 June 2023.

On 17 August, Olympique Lyonnais announced that Assimina Maoulida had been loaned to Issy until 30 June 2023, Lola Gallardo had left the club to re-join Atlético Madrid and that Katriina Talaslahti had left the club after her contract was terminated by mutual agreement.

On 8 October, Kysha Sylla signed her first professional contract with Olympique Lyonnais until 30 June 2024.

On 12 November, Olympique Lyonnais extended their contract with Grace Kazadi until 30 June 2023.

On 6 December, Olympique Lyonnais extended their contract with Selma Bacha until 30 June 2025.

On 4 January, Sally Julini extended her contract with Olympique Lyonnais until 30 June 2024, and then joined Guingamp on loan for the remainder of the season.

On 31 January, Signe Bruun joined Manchester United on loan for the remainder of the season.

On 31 January, Grace Kazadi joined Sevilla on loan for the remainder of the season.

On 9 May, Wendie Renard extended her contract with Olympique Lyonnais until 30 June 2026.

== Squad ==
As of match played 1 June 2022

No.	Name	Nationality	Position	Date of birth (age)	Signed from	Signed in	Contract ends	Apps.	Goals
Goalkeepers
1	Christiane Endler	(Chile)	GK	23 July 1991 (aged 30)	Paris Saint-Germain	2021	2024	28	0
16	Sarah Bouhaddi	(France)	GK	17 October 1986 (aged 35)	Juvisy	2009	2024	312	1
30	Alyssia Paljevic	(France)	GK	22 June 2002 (aged 19)	Academy	2021	2022	0	0
40	Emma Holmgren	(Sweden)	GK	13 May 1997 (aged 25)	Eskilstuna United	2021	2023	5	0
Defenders
3	Wendie Renard	(France)	DF	20 July 1990 (aged 31)	Academy	2006	2026	423	137
4	Selma Bacha	(France)	DF	9 November 2000 (aged 21)	Academy	2017	2025	110	6
5	Perle Morroni	(France)	DF	15 October 1997 (aged 24)	Paris Saint-Germain	2021	2024	28	2
12	Ellie Carpenter	(Australia)	DF	28 April 2000 (aged 22)	Portland Thorns	2020	2023	53	1
18	Alice Sombath	(France)	DF	16 October 2003 (aged 18)	Paris Saint-Germain	2020		14	0
21	Kadeisha Buchanan	(Canada)	DF	5 November 1995 (aged 26)	West Virginia Mountaineers	2017		126	8
23	Janice Cayman	(Belgium)	DF	12 October 1988 (aged 33)	Montpellier	2019	2023	56	9
29	Griedge Mbock Bathy	(France)	DF	26 February 1995 (aged 27)	Guingamp	2015	2024	163	33
	Florine Belin	(France)	DF	4 August 2003 (aged 18)	Academy	2020		0	0
	Chloé Tapia	(France)	DF	30 May 2002 (aged 20)	Academy	2021		0	0
Midfielders
6	Amandine Henry	(France)	MF	28 September 1989 (aged 32)	Portland Thorns	2018	2023 (+1)	335	68
7	Amel Majri	(France)	MF	25 January 1993 (aged 29)	Academy	2010		250	79
8	Sara Björk Gunnarsdóttir	(Iceland)	MF	29 September 1990 (aged 31)	VfL Wolfsburg	2020	2022	28	5
10	Dzsenifer Marozsán	(Germany)	MF	18 April 1992 (aged 30)	1. FFC Frankfurt	2016	2023	153	56
11	Damaris Egurrola	(Netherlands)	MF	26 August 1999 (aged 22)	Everton	2021	2024	30	3
13	Catarina Macario	(United States)	MF	4 October 1999 (aged 22)	Stanford Cardinal	2021	2023	46	29
17	Daniëlle van de Donk	(Netherlands)	MF	5 August 1991 (aged 30)	Arsenal	2021	2023	14	4
26	Lindsey Horan	(United States)	MF	26 May 1994 (aged 28)	on loan from Portland Thorns	2022	2023	10	0
31	Laurine Baga	(France)	MF	15 May 2003 (aged 19)	Academy	2021		4	0
32	Nesrine Bahlouli	(France)	MF	20 February 2003 (aged 19)	Academy	2021		0	0
34	Kysha Sylla	(France)	MF	4 February 2004 (aged 18)	Academy	2021	2024	1	0
	Celia Bensalem	(France)	MF	9 November 2004 (aged 17)	Academy	2021		1	0
	Yasmine Klai	(France)	MF	15 September 2002 (aged 19)	Academy	2017		0	0
	Marine Pierret	(France)	MF	15 October 2001 (aged 20)	Academy	2019		0	0
Forwards
9	Eugénie Le Sommer	(France)	FW	18 May 1989 (aged 33)	Stade Briochin	2010	2023	345	279
14	Ada Hegerberg	(Norway)	FW	10 July 1995 (aged 26)	Turbine Potsdam	2014	2024	212	237
19	Emelyne Laurent	(France)	FW	4 November 1998 (aged 23)	Girondins Bordeaux	2017		38	6
20	Delphine Cascarino	(France)	FW	5 February 1997 (aged 25)	Academy	2015	2024	179	33
25	Inès Benyahia	(France)	FW	26 March 2003 (aged 19)	Academy	2020		9	1
27	Vicki Bècho	(France)	FW	3 October 2003 (aged 18)	Paris Saint-Germain	2020		4	0
28	Melvine Malard	(France)	FW	28 June 2000 (aged 21)	Academy	2017		66	25
	Nihed Naïli	(Algeria)	FW	11 April 2001 (aged 21)	Academy	2021		0	0
	Yrma Mze Issa	(Comoros)	FW	26 October 2003 (aged 18)	Academy	2021		0	0
Out on loan
2	Grace Kazadi	(France)	DF	31 January 2001 (aged 21)	Academy	2016	2023	1	0
22	Sally Julini	(Switzerland)	MF	1 January 2003 (aged 19)	Academy	2020	2024	8	1
24	Signe Bruun	(Denmark)	FW	6 April 1998 (aged 24)	Paris Saint-Germain	2021	2023	20	7
	Assimina Maoulida	(France)	DF	30 January 2002 (aged 20)	Academy	2020		0	0
	Manon Revelli	(France)	DF	26 November 2001 (aged 20)	Academy	2019	2023	2	0
Left during the season
1	Lola Gallardo	(Spain)	GK	10 June 1993 (aged 28)	Atlético Madrid	2020	2022	4	0
17	Nikita Parris	(England)	FW	10 March 1994 (aged 28)	Manchester City	2019	2022	48	32
40	Katriina Talaslahti	(Finland)	GK	21 September 2000 (aged 21)	Bayern Munich	2019	2022	0	0

== Transfers ==
=== In ===
Date	Position	Nationality	Name	From	Fee	Ref.
21 June 2021	GK	(Chile)	Christiane Endler	Paris Saint-Germain	Undisclosed	
21 June 2021	MF	(Netherlands)	Daniëlle van de Donk	Arsenal	Undisclosed	
21 June 2021	FW	(Denmark)	Signe Bruun	Paris Saint-Germain	Undisclosed	
23 June 2021	DF	(France)	Perle Morroni	Paris Saint-Germain	Undisclosed	
13 August 2021	GK	(Sweden)	Emma Holmgren	Eskilstuna United	Undisclosed	

=== Out ===
Date	Position	Nationality	Name	To	Fee	Ref.
2 July 2021	FW	(England)	Nikita Parris	Arsenal	€80,000	
17 August 2021	GK	(Spain)	Lola Gallardo	Atlético Madrid	Undisclosed	

=== Loans out ===
Start date	Position	Nationality	Name	To	End date	Ref.
5 June 2021	GK	(France)	Sarah Bouhaddi	OL Reign	31 December 2021	
5 June 2021	MF	(Germany)	Dzsenifer Marozsán	OL Reign	31 December 2021	
17 August 2021	DF	(France)	Assimina Maoulida	Issy	30 June 2023	
4 January 2022	MF	(Switzerland)	Sally Julini	Guingamp	30 June 2023	
27 January 2022	FW	(Denmark)	Signe Bruun	Manchester United	30 June 2023	
31 January 2022	DF	(France)	Grace Kazadi	Sevilla		

=== Released ===
Date	Position	Nationality	Name	Joined	Date	Ref.
17 August 2021	GK	(Finland)	Katriina Talaslahti	Fleury		

== Friendlies ==
=== International Champions Cup ===
19 August 2021 Semifinal	Barcelona (Spain)	2–3	(France) Olympique Lyonnais	Portland, United States
02:36 CEST (UTC+2)	Caldentey 9', 63'	Report	Majri 20'; Henry 27'; Malard 85'	Stadium: Providence Park; Referee: Katja Koroleva (United States)

21 August 2021 Final	Portland Thorns (United States)	1–0	(France) Olympique Lyonnais	Portland, United States
04:06 CEST (UTC+2)	Rodríguez (yellow card) 26'; Weaver 87'	Report	Malard (yellow card) 12' van de Donk (yellow card) 77'	Stadium: Providence Park; Referee: Laura Rodriguez (United States)

== Competitions ==
=== Overview ===
Competition	First match	Last match	Starting round	Final position	Record							
Competition	First match	Last match	Starting round	Final position	Pld	W	D	L	GF	GA	GD	Win %
Division 1	27 August 2021	1 June 2022	Matchday 1	Winners	22	21	1	0	79	8	+71	95.45
Coupe de France	8 January 2022	29 January 2022	Round of 32	Round of 16	2	1	0	1	4	3	+1	50.00
UEFA Champions League	1 September 2021	21 May 2022	Second Round	Winners	13	11	0	2	35	11	+24	84.62
Total					37	33	1	3	118	22	+96	89.19

Last updated: 1 June 2022
Source: Competitions

=== Division 1 ===
==== Results summary ====
Overall								Home						Away					
Pld	W	D	L	GF	GA	GD	Pts	W	D	L	GF	GA	GD	W	D	L	GF	GA	GD
22	21	1	0	79	8	+71	64	11	0	0	49	1	+48	10	1	0	30	7	+23

Last updated: 1 June 2022.

==== Results by matchday ====
Matchday	1	2	3	4	5	6	7	8	9	10	11	12	13	14	15	16	17	18	19	20	21	22
Ground	H	H	H	H	A	H	A	H	A	H	A	A	H	H	A	A	A	A	A	H	A	H
Result	W	W	W	W	W	W	W	W	W	W	W	W	W	W	W	D	W	W	W	W	W	W
Position	3	1	1	1	1	1	1	1	1	1	1	1	1	1	1	1	1	1	1	1	1	1

Updated to match(es) played on 1 June 2022. Source: Results
A = Away; H = Home; W = Win; D = Draw; L = Loss; P = Postponed

==== Results ====
27 August 2021 1	Olympique Lyonnais	3–0	Stade Reims	Décines-Charpieu
18:30 CEST (UTC+2)	Kith 6' (o.g.); Cascarino 10' (yellow card) 70'; Bacha 90+3'	Report	Deslandes (yellow card) 5'; Feller (yellow card) 24'; Ouchene (yellow card) 69'	Stadium: Stade Gérard Houllier; Referee: Maika Vanderstichel

5 September 2021 2	Olympique Lyonnais	6–0	AS Saint-Étienne	Décines-Charpieu
13:00 CEST (UTC+2)	Macario 18'; Laurent (yellow card) 24' (goal) 53'; Majri 28'; Malard 42'; Egurrola 56'; Bacha 84'	Report	Uffren (yellow card) 22'; Bornes (yellow card) 45+3'; Condon (yellow card) 82'	Stadium: Stade Gérard Houllier; Referee: Victoria Beyer

12 September 2021 3	Olympique Lyonnais	6–0	Dijon FCO	Décines-Charpieu
15:05 CEST (UTC+2)	Macario 3', 37'; Buchanan (yellow card) 32'; Malard 36'; Bruun 47', 66', 78'	Report	Fercocq (yellow card) 54'	Stadium: Stade Gérard Houllier; Referee: Savina Elbour

24 September 2021 4	Olympique Lyonnais	4–0	Guingamp	Décines-Charpieu
18:30 CEST (UTC+2)	Malard 3'; Bacha (yellow card) 15'; Buchanan (yellow card) 28' (goal) 48'; Henry (yellow card) 31'; Laurent 72' van de Donk 86'	Report	Péniguel (yellow card) 27'	Stadium: Stade Gérard Houllier; Referee: Maika Vanderstichel

1 October 2021 5	Girondins Bordeaux	1–4	Olympique Lyonnais	Le Bouscat
21:00 CEST (UTC+2)	Jaurena 3'; Lardez (yellow card) 59'; Périsset (yellow card) 76'; Bilbault (yellow card) 77'	Report	Macario 7'; Majri 26'; Buchanan (yellow card) 69'; Mbock 73' (pen.); Egurrola (yellow card) 80' (goal) 87'	Stadium: Stade Sainte-Germaine; Referee: Victoria Beyer

17 October 2021 6	Olympique Lyonnais	5–0	Montpellier	Décines-Charpieu
12:45 CEST (UTC+2)	Bacha 33'; Torrent 45+2'; Morroni 47'; Malard 59'; Julini 88'	Report	Torrent (yellow card) 31'; Mondésir (yellow card) 86'	Stadium: Stade Gérard Houllier; Referee: Savina Elbour

31 October 2021 7	Soyaux	1–6	Olympique Lyonnais	Besançon
12:45 CET (UTC+1)	Luijks 6'	Report	Macario 5'; Bruun 13', 39'; Cayman 28'; Malard 76'; Mbock 79'	Stadium: Stade Léo Lagrange; Referee: Audrey Gerbel

14 November 2021 8	Olympique Lyonnais	6–1	Paris Saint-Germain	Décines-Charpieu
21:00 CET (UTC+1)	Macario 15' (pen.) van de Donk 18'; Malard 53'; Egurrola 59'; Hegerberg 79', 82'	Report	Lawrence (red card) 26'; Ilestedt 75'	Stadium: Parc Olympique Lyonnais; Referee: Silvia Andreia Rosa Domingos

21 November 2021 9	Issy	0–4	Olympique Lyonnais	Issy-les-Moulineaux
12:45 CET (UTC+1)	Prisock (yellow card) 83'	Report	Malard 4'; Macario 6'; Bruun 71'; Hegerberg 79'	Stadium: Cité des Sports; Referee: Emeline Rochebilière

5 December 2021 10	Olympique Lyonnais	4–0	Fleury 91	Décines-Charpieu
14:45 CET (UTC+1)	Hegerberg 24'; Cayman 30'; Mbock 39'; Henry 52' (yellow card) 83'; Renard (yellow card) 54'; Bacha (yellow card) 68'	Report	Yango (yellow card) 18'; Kouassi (yellow card) 47'	Stadium: Stade Gérard Houllier; Referee: Victoria Beyer

12 December 2021 11	Paris FC	1–2	Olympique Lyonnais	Paris
12:45 CET (UTC+1)	Vaysse (yellow card) 42' (yellow-red card) 64'; Greboval 45+1'; Soyer (yellow card) 82'; Laplacette (yellow card) 86'	Report	Cascarino 38'; Hegerberg 39'; Henry (yellow card) 88'	Stadium: Stade Sébastien Charléty; Referee: Alexandra Collin

20 January 2022 13	Montpellier	2–3	Olympique Lyonnais	Montpellier
17:00 CET (UTC+1)	Petermann 18', 44' (pen.); Mpomé (yellow card) 24'; Elsig (yellow card) 53'	Report	Mbock 5', 89'; Le Sommer 42'	Stadium: Stade Bernard Gasset; Referee: Emeline Rochebilière

6 February 2022 14	Olympique Lyonnais	1–0	Girondins Bordeaux	Décines-Charpieu
14:45 CET (UTC+1)	Malard 25'; Le Sommer (yellow card) 45' (yellow-red card) 56'	Report	Amanda (yellow card) 79'; Périsset (yellow card) 87'	Stadium: Stade Gérard Houllier; Referee: Alexandra Collin

11 February 2022 12	Olympique Lyonnais	8–0	Soyaux	Décines-Charpieu
21:00 CET (UTC+1)	Hegerberg 19', 52', 70'; Macario 38', 86'; Mbock 45+1'; Malard 71'; Benyahia 77'; Baga (yellow card) 79'	Report	Yang (yellow card) 35'; Battouri (yellow card) 48'	Stadium: Stade Gérard Houllier; Referee: Savina Elbour

27 February 2022 15	Stade Reims	0–2	Olympique Lyonnais	Reims
14:45 CET (UTC+1)		Report	Carpenter (yellow card) 33'; Malard 61'; Renard 90+3'	Stadium: Stade Auguste-Delaune II; Referee: Emeline Rochebilière

12 March 2022 16	AS Saint-Étienne	1–1	Olympique Lyonnais	Saint-Étienne
14:30 CET (UTC+1)	Multari (yellow card) 21'; Bornes (yellow card) 38'; Caputo (yellow card) 43'; Uffren 73'; Burns (yellow card) 89'	Report	Carpenter (yellow card) 78'; Malard 79'	Stadium: Stade Salif Keita; Referee: Siham Benmahammed

18 March 2022 17	Dijon FCO	0–3	Olympique Lyonnais	Dijon
18:45 CET (UTC+1)	Sunday (yellow card) 26'	Report	Macario 9', 35'; Renard (yellow card) 31'; Malard 62'	Stadium: Stade Gaston Gérard; Referee: Emeline Rochebilière

3 April 2022 18	Guingamp	0–2	Olympique Lyonnais	Guingamp
12:45 CEST (UTC+2)		Report	Macario 10'; Hegerberg 37'	Stadium: Stade de Roudourou; Referee: Savina Elbour

17 April 2022 19	Fleury 91	1–2	Olympique Lyonnais	Fleury-Mérogis
14:45 CEST (UTC+2)	Grabowska (yellow card) 19'; Kouassi 36'	Report	Talaslahti 37' (o.g.); Macario 60' (yellow card) 90'	Stadium: Terrain Walter Felder; Referee: Alexandra Collin

8 May 2022 20	Olympique Lyonnais	2–0	Paris FC	Décines-Charpieu
14:45 CEST (UTC+2)	Hegerberg 45'; Cascarino 61'	Report	Greboval (yellow card) 56'	Stadium: Stade Gérard Houllier; Referee: Savina Elbour

29 May 2022 21	Paris Saint-Germain	0–1	Olympique Lyonnais	Paris
21:00 CEST (UTC+2)		Report	Macario 3'; Egurrola (yellow card) 86'	Stadium: Stade Jean-Bouin; Referee: Alexandra Collin

1 June 2022 22	Olympique Lyonnais	4–0	Issy	Décines-Charpieu
20:45 CEST (UTC+2)	Le Sommer 30'; Malard 52'; Egurrola (yellow card) 62' van de Donk 82'; Renard 90+1'	Report	Debonne (yellow card) 33'; Donnary (yellow card) 38'	Stadium: Stade Gérard Houllier; Referee: Victoria Beyer

==== Table ====
Pos	Team	Pld	W	D	L	GF	GA	GD	Pts	Qualification or relegation
1	Lyon (C)	22	21	1	0	79	8	+71	64	Qualification for the Champions League group stage
2	Paris Saint-Germain	22	17	2	3	68	12	+56	53	Qualification for the Champions League second round
3	Paris FC	22	16	2	4	49	21	+28	50	Qualification for the Champions League first round
4	Fleury	22	14	1	7	36	26	+10	43	
5	Montpellier	22	11	2	9	38	25	+13	35	
6	Bordeaux	22	11	2	9	38	29	+9	35	
7	Reims	22	10	3	9	29	38	−9	33	
8	Guingamp	22	4	5	13	23	57	−34	17	
9	Soyaux	22	5	1	16	18	55	−37	16	
10	Dijon	22	3	6	13	13	45	−32	15	
11	Issy (R)	22	4	1	17	19	57	−38	13	Relegation to Division 2 Féminine
12	Saint-Étienne (R)	22	1	4	17	17	54	−37	7	Relegation to Division 2 Féminine

Source: Division 1 Féminine
Rules for classification: 1) points; 2) head-to-head points; 3) head-to-head goal difference; 4) goal difference; 5) goals scored
(C) Champions; (R) Relegated

=== Coupe de France ===
8 January 2022 Round of 32	Girondins Bordeaux	0–4	Olympique Lyonnais	Le Bouscat
15:00 CET (UTC+1)	Palis (yellow card) 50'		Renard 12', 31'; Morroni (yellow card) 22'; Marozsán 24' (yellow card) 67'; Hegerberg 26'; Carpenter (yellow card) 59'	Stadium: Stade Sainte Germain; Attendance: 1,412; Referee: Charlène Laur

29 January 2022 Round of 16	Paris Saint-Germain	3–0	Olympique Lyonnais	Saint-Germain-en-Laye
13:00	Geyoro (yellow card) 45'; Baltimore 48'; Diani 76'; Katoto 85' (yellow card) 90+4'		Morroni (yellow card) 26'; Cascarino (yellow card) 69'; Bacha (yellow card) 78'	Stadium: Stade Municipal Georges Lefèvre; Attendance: 420; Referee: Victoria Beyer

=== UEFA Champions League ===
==== Qualifying rounds ====
1 September 2021 Round 2 1st leg	Levante (Spain)	1–2	(France) Olympique Lyonnais	Valencia, Spain
21:00 CEST (UTC+2)	Méndez (yellow card) 44'; Părăluță (yellow card) 72'; Cometti (yellow card) 82'; Crivelari 86'	Report	Bacha (yellow card) 23' (yellow-red card) 90+3'; Buchanan (yellow card) 69'; Malard 80'; Morroni 84'	Stadium: Ciutat de València; Referee: Jelena Međedović (Serbia)

8 September 2021 Round 2 2nd leg	Olympique Lyonnais (France)	2–1 (4–2 agg.)	(Spain) Levante	Décines-Charpieu
18:00 CEST (UTC+2)	Egurrola (yellow card) 26'; Renard (yellow card) 55'; Majri 60'; Macario 63'	Report	Toletti (yellow card) 30'; Andonova (yellow card) 33'; Alharilla (yellow card) 38'; Irene (yellow card) 52'; Tomás (yellow card) 58'; Gio (yellow card) 60'; Cometti 64'; Méndez (yellow card) 67'	Stadium: Stade Gérard Houllier; Referee: Rebecca Welch (England)

==== Group stage ====
Pos	Team	Pld	W	D	L	GF	GA	GD	Pts	Qualification
1	(France) Lyon	6	5	0	1	19	2	+17	15	Advance to Quarter-finals
2	(Germany) Bayern Munich	6	4	1	1	15	3	+12	13	Advance to Quarter-finals
3	(Portugal) Benfica	6	1	1	4	2	16	−14	4	
4	(Sweden) BK Häcken	6	1	0	5	3	18	−15	3	

Source: UEFA
Rules for classification: Group stage tiebreakers

5 October 2021 1	BK Häcken (Sweden)	0–3	(France) Olympique Lyonnais	Gothenburg, Sweden
18:45 CEST (UTC+2)	Gevitz (yellow card) 24'	Report	Malard 10'; Macario 48'; Larsen 53' (o.g.); Egurrola (yellow card) 86'	Stadium: Bravida Arena; Referee: Lorraine Watson (Scotland)

14 October 2021 2	Olympique Lyonnais (France)	5–0	(Portugal) Benfica	Décines-Charpieu, France
21:00 CEST (UTC+2)	Buchanan 29', 63'; Van de Donk 31'; Malard 53'; Macario 56' (pen.)	Report		Stadium: Parc Olympique Lyonnais; Referee: Cheryl Foster (Wales)

10 November 2021 3	Olympique Lyonnais (France)	2–1	(Germany) Bayern Munich	Décines-Charpieu, France
21:00 CET (UTC+1)	Cayman 50'; Mbock (yellow card) 82'; Henry 86'; Macario (yellow card) 90+1'	Report	Buchanan 25' (o.g.)	Stadium: Parc Olympique Lyonnais; Referee: Monika Mularczyk (Poland)

17 November 2021 4	Bayern Munich (Germany)	1–0	(France) Olympique Lyonnais	Munich, Germany
21:00 CET (UTC+1)	Kumagai 69'; Magull (yellow card) 76'	Report	Egurrola (yellow card) 18'	Stadium: FC Bayern Campus; Referee: Lina Lehtovaara (Finland)

9 December 2021 5	Benfica (Portugal)	0–5	(France) Olympique Lyonnais	Seixal, Portugal
21:00 CET (UTC+1)		Report	Hegerberg 1', 45+3'; Renard 27'; Mbock 40'; Carpenter (yellow card) 45+1'; Bruun 52'; Morroni (yellow card) 75'	Stadium: Benfica Campus; Referee: Rebecca Welch (England)

15 December 2021 6	Olympique Lyonnais (France)	4–0	(Sweden) BK Häcken	Décines-Charpieu, France
18:45 CET (UTC+1)	Macario 35'; Carpenter (yellow card) 39'; Hegerberg 52'; Henry 76'; Cayman 79'; Buchanan (yellow card) 89'	Report		Stadium: Stade Gérard Houllier; Referee: Marta Huerta de Aza (Spain)

==== Knockout phase ====
23 March 2022 Quarterfinal 1st leg	Juventus (Italy)	2–1	(France) Olympique Lyonnais	Turin, Italy
18:45 CET (UTC+1)	Girelli 71'; Bonfantini 83' (yellow card) 88'; Bonansea (yellow card) 90+1'	Report	Macario 8'; Carpenter (red card) 62'	Stadium: Juventus Stadium; Attendance: 9,227; Referee: Cheryl Foster (Wales)

31 March 2022 Quarterfinal 2nd leg	Olympique Lyonnais (France)	3–1 (4–3 agg.)	(Italy) Juventus	Décines-Charpieu, France
21:00 CEST (UTC+2)	Hegerberg 33' (yellow card) 90+4'; Malard 35'; Egurrola (yellow card) 45'; Horan (yellow card) 71'; Macario 73'	Report	Girelli (yellow card) 17'; Lundorf (yellow card) 80'; Stašková 84'; Gama (yellow card) 90+4'	Stadium: Parc Olympique Lyonnais; Attendance: 20,017; Referee: Riem Hussein (Germany)

24 April 2022 Semifinal 1st leg	Olympique Lyonnais (France)	3–2	(France) Paris Saint-Germain	Décines-Charpieu, France
17:00 CEST (UTC+2)	Renard 23' (pen.); Macario 34', 50'	Report	Katoto 6'; Geyoro (yellow card) 13'; Baltimore (yellow card) 34'; Dudek 58' (pen.); Karchaoui (yellow card) 63'	Stadium: Parc Olympique Lyonnais; Attendance: 22,774; Referee: Ivana Martinčić (Croatia)

30 April 2022 Semifinal 2nd leg	Paris Saint-Germain (France)	1–2 (3–5 agg.)	(France) Olympique Lyonnais	Paris, France
21:00 CEST (UTC+2)	Katoto 62'	Report	Hegerberg 14'; Bacha (yellow card) 49'; Renard 83'	Stadium: Parc des Princes; Attendance: 43,255; Referee: Rebecca Welch (England)

==== Final ====
21 May 2022	Barcelona (Spain)	1–3	(France) Olympique Lyonnais	Turin, Italy
19:00 CEST (UTC+2)	León (yellow card) 33'; Putellas 41'; Paredes (yellow card) 85'	Report	Henry 6'; Hegerberg 23' (yellow card) 45+3'; Macario 33' (yellow card) 64'; Morroni (yellow card) 90+4'	Stadium: Juventus Stadium; Attendance: 32,257; Referee: Lina Lehtovaara (Finland)

== Squad statistics ==
As of match played 1 June 2022

=== Appearances ===
No.	Pos	Nat	Player	Total		Division 1		Coupe de France		UEFA Champions League	
No.	Pos	Nat	Player	Apps	Goals	Apps	Goals	Apps	Goals	Apps	Goals
1	GK	(Chile) CHI	Christiane Endler	28	0	14	0	2	0	12	0
3	DF	(France) FRA	Wendie Renard	27	7	16	2	2	2	9	3
4	DF	(France) FRA	Selma Bacha	32	3	15+4	3	2	0	11	0
5	DF	(France) FRA	Perle Morroni	28	2	12+4	1	2	0	7+3	1
6	MF	(France) FRA	Amandine Henry	31	4	17+1	1	0	0	12+1	3
7	MF	(France) FRA	Amel Majri	7	3	5	2	0	0	2	1
8	MF	(Iceland) ISL	Sara Gunnarsdóttir	6	0	0+5	0	0	0	0+1	0
9	FW	(France) FRA	Eugénie Le Sommer	12	2	6+1	2	1+1	0	0+3	0
10	MF	(Germany) GER	Dzsenifer Marozsán	6	1	1+2	0	1+1	1	0+1	0
11	MF	(Netherlands) NED	Damaris Egurrola	23	3	9+5	3	0	0	7+2	0
12	DF	(Australia) AUS	Ellie Carpenter	29	0	15+1	0	1	0	12	0
13	MF	(United States) USA	Catarina Macario	35	23	18+2	14	1+1	0	12+1	9
14	FW	(Norway) NOR	Ada Hegerberg	28	17	12+4	10	2	1	7+3	6
16	GK	(France) FRA	Sarah Bouhaddi	5	0	4	0	0	0	1	0
17	MF	(Netherlands) NED	Daniëlle van de Donk	14	4	7+2	3	0	0	4+1	1
18	DF	(France) FRA	Alice Sombath	14	0	5+7	0	0	0	0+2	0
19	FW	(France) FRA	Emelyne Laurent	19	2	3+9	2	0	0	0+7	0
20	FW	(France) FRA	Delphine Cascarino	32	3	18	3	2	0	11+1	0
21	DF	(Canada) CAN	Kadeisha Buchanan	33	3	17+1	1	2	0	11+2	2
23	DF	(Belgium) BEL	Janice Cayman	31	4	7+12	2	1	0	3+8	2
25	FW	(France) FRA	Inès Benyahia	7	1	2+3	1	0	0	0+2	0
26	MF	(United States) USA	Lindsey Horan	10	0	2+3	0	0	0	4+1	0
28	FW	(France) FRA	Melvine Malard	35	17	17+3	13	1+1	0	9+4	4
29	DF	(France) FRA	Griedge Mbock	28	7	14+4	6	2	0	7+1	1
31	MF	(France) FRA	Laurine Baga	4	0	0+3	0	0	0	0+1	0
34	MF	(France) FRA	Kysha Sylla	1	0	0+1	0	0	0	0	0
35	MF	(France) FRA	Celia Bensalem	1	0	0+1	0	0	0	0	0
40	GK	(Sweden) SWE	Emma Holmgren	5	0	4	0	0+1	0	0	0
Players away from the club on loan:
2	DF	(France) FRA	Grace Kazadi	1	0	0	0	0	0	0+1	0
22	MF	(Switzerland) SUI	Sally Julini	5	1	0+4	1	0	0	0+1	0
24	FW	(Denmark) DEN	Signe Bruun	20	7	2+9	6	0+1	0	2+6	1
Players who appeared for Olympique Lyonnais but left during the season:

=== Goal scorers ===
Place	Position	Nation	Number	Name	Division 1	Coupe de France	UEFA Champions League	Total
1	MF	(United States)	13	Catarina Macario	14	0	9	23
2	FW	(France)	28	Melvine Malard	13	0	4	17
2	FW	(Norway)	14	Ada Hegerberg	10	1	6	17
4	FW	(Denmark)	24	Signe Bruun	6	0	1	7
4	DF	(France)	29	Griedge Mbock	6	0	1	7
4	DF	(France)	3	Wendie Renard	2	2	3	7
7	MF	(Netherlands)	17	Daniëlle van de Donk	3	0	1	4
7	DF	(Belgium)	23	Janice Cayman	2	0	2	4
7	MF	(France)	6	Amandine Henry	1	0	3	4
10	DF	(France)	4	Selma Bacha	3	0	0	3
10	MF	(Netherlands)	11	Damaris Egurrola	3	0	0	3
10	FW	(France)	20	Delphine Cascarino	3	0	0	3
10	MF	(France)	7	Amel Majri	2	0	1	3
10	DF	(Canada)	21	Kadeisha Buchanan	1	0	2	3
10				Own goal	3	0	0	3
16	FW	(France)	9	Eugénie Le Sommer	2	0	0	2
16	FW	(France)	19	Emelyne Laurent	2	0	0	2
16	DF	(France)	5	Perle Morroni	1	0	1	2
19	MF	(Switzerland)	22	Sally Julini	1	0	0	1
19	FW	(France)	25	Inès Benyahia	1	0	0	1
19	MF	(Germany)	10	Dzsenifer Marozsán	0	1	0	1
Total					79	4	35	118

=== Clean sheets ===
Place	Position	Nation	Number	Name	Division 1	Coupe de France	UEFA Champions League	Total
1	GK	(Chile)	1	Christiane Endler	10	1	4	15
2	GK	(France)	16	Sarah Bouhaddi	3	0	0	3
3	GK	(Sweden)	40	Emma Holmgren	2	0	0	2
Total					15	1	4	20

=== Disciplinary record ===
Number	Nation	Position	Name	Division 1		Coupe de France		UEFA Champions League		Total	
Number	Nation	Position	Name	Booked	Sent off (straight red)	Booked	Sent off (straight red)	Booked	Sent off (straight red)	Booked	Sent off (straight red)
3	(France)	DF	Wendie Renard	2	0	0	0	1	0	3	0
4	(France)	DF	Selma Bacha	2	0	1	0	2	1	5	1
5	(France)	DF	Perle Morroni	0	0	2	0	2	0	4	0
6	(France)	MF	Amandine Henry	3	0	0	0	0	0	3	0
9	(France)	FW	Eugénie Le Sommer	2	1	0	0	0	0	2	1
10	(Germany)	MF	Dzsenifer Marozsán	0	0	1	0	0	0	1	0
11	(Netherlands)	MF	Damaris Egurrola	3	0	0	0	4	0	7	0
12	(Australia)	DF	Ellie Carpenter	2	0	1	0	2	1	5	1
13	(United States)	MF	Catarina Macario	1	0	0	0	2	0	3	0
14	(Norway)	FW	Ada Hegerberg	0	0	0	0	2	0	2	0
19	(France)	FW	Emelyne Laurent	1	0	0	0	0	0	1	0
20	(France)	FW	Delphine Cascarino	1	0	1	0	0	0	2	0
21	(Canada)	DF	Kadeisha Buchanan	3	0	0	0	2	0	5	0
26	(United States)	MF	Lindsey Horan	0	0	0	0	1	0	1	0
29	(Canada)	DF	Griedge Mbock	0	0	0	0	1	0	1	0
31	(France)	MF	Laurine Baga	1	0	0	0	0	0	1	0
Players away on loan:
Players who left Olympique Lyonnais during the season:
Total				21	1	6	0	19	2	46	3
