= 2020–21 Olympique Lyonnais Féminin season =

Olympique Lyonnais Féminin
2020–21 season
- Manager: Jean-Luc Vasseur, Sonia Bompastor
- Stadium: Groupama OL Training Center
- Division 1: 2nd
- Coupe de France: Cancelled
- UEFA Champions League: Quarterfinal vs Paris Saint-Germain
- Top goalscorer: League: Nikita Parris (13); All: Nikita Parris (15)
Home colours	Away colours	Third colours

The 2020–21 Olympique Lyonnais Féminin season was the club's seventeenth season since FC Lyon joined OL as its women's section. Olympique Lyonnais finished runner up in the Division 1 Féminine for the first time in 14 seasons and were eliminated from the UEFA Women's Champions League by Paris Saint-Germain, while the Coupe de France Féminine was cancelled.

== Season events ==
On 22 June, Olympique Lyonnais announced that they had extended their contract with Sarah Bouhaddi until 30 June 2024, and with Dzsenifer Marozsán until 30 June 2023.

On 1 July, Olympique Lyonnais announced that they had signed professional contracts with academy player Inès Benyahia, Alice Sombath and Vicki Bècho from Paris Saint-Germain and Assimina Maoulida from US Orléans.

On 21 September, Shanice van de Sanden left Olympique Lyonnais to join VfL Wolfsburg.

On 23 September, Celia joined Olympique Lyonnais on loan from OL Reign for the season.

On 18 December, Ada Hegerberg extended her contract with Olympique Lyonnais until 30 June 2024.

On 5 January, Olympique Lyonnais extended their contract with Jodie Taylor until the end of the season. The following day, 6 January, Olympique Lyonnais extended their contract with Manon Revelli until 30 June 2023, and also loan her to Servette until the end of the season.

On 12 January, Olympique Lyonnais announced the signing of Catarina Macario from Stanford Cardinal on a contract until 30 June 2023.

On 20 January, Olympique Lyonnais announced the signing of Damaris Egurrola from Everton on a contract until 30 June 2024.

On 4 February, Griedge Mbock extended her contract with Olympique Lyonnais until 30 June 2024.

On 10 February, Amandine Henry extended her contract with Olympique Lyonnais until 30 June 2023, with the option of an additional year.

On 17 March, Eugénie Le Sommer extended her contract with Olympique Lyonnais until 30 June 2023.

On 22 April, Janice Cayman extended her contract with Olympique Lyonnais until 30 June 2023.

On 7 May, Delphine Cascarino extended her contract with Olympique Lyonnais until 30 June 2024.

On 5 June, Sarah Bouhaddi and Dzsenifer Marozsán joined OL Reign on loan until 31 December 2021.

== Squad ==
As of match played 4 June 2021

No.	Name	Nationality	Position	Date of birth (age)	Signed from	Signed in	Contract ends	Apps.	Goals
Goalkeepers
1	Lola Gallardo	(Spain)	GK	10 June 1993 (aged 27)	Atlético Madrid	2020	2022	4	0
16	Sarah Bouhaddi	(France)	GK	17 October 1986 (aged 34)	Juvisy	2009	2024	307	1
40	Katriina Talaslahti	(Finland)	GK	21 September 2000 (aged 20)	Bayern Munich	2019	2022	0	0
Defenders
3	Wendie Renard	(France)	DF	20 July 1990 (aged 30)	Academy	2006		396	130
4	Selma Bacha	(France)	DF	9 November 2000 (aged 20)	Academy	2017		78	3
12	Ellie Carpenter	(Australia)	DF	28 April 2000 (aged 21)	Portland Thorns	2020	2023	24	1
18	Alice Sombath	(France)	DF	16 October 2003 (aged 17)	Paris Saint-Germain	2020	2023	0	0
21	Kadeisha Buchanan	(Canada)	DF	5 November 1995 (aged 25)	West Virginia Mountaineers	2017		93	5
23	Janice Cayman	(Belgium)	DF	12 October 1988 (aged 32)	Montpellier	2019	2023	25	5
26	Sakina Karchaoui	(France)	DF	26 January 1996 (aged 25)	Montpellier	2020		27	0
29	Griedge Mbock Bathy	(France)	DF	26 February 1995 (aged 26)	Guingamp	2015	2024	135	26
	Florine Belin	(France)	DF	4 August 2003 (aged 17)	Academy	2020		0	0
Midfielders
5	Saki Kumagai	(Japan)	MF	17 October 1990 (aged 30)	1. FFC Frankfurt	2013		240	43
6	Amandine Henry	(France)	MF	28 September 1989 (aged 31)	Portland Thorns	2018	2023 (+1)	304	63
7	Amel Majri	(France)	MF	25 January 1993 (aged 28)	Academy	2010		243	674
8	Sara Björk Gunnarsdóttir	(Iceland)	MF	29 September 1990 (aged 30)	VfL Wolfsburg	2020	2022	22	5
10	Dzsenifer Marozsán	(Germany)	MF	18 April 1992 (aged 29)	1. FFC Frankfurt	2016		147	55
11	Damaris Egurrola	(Spain)	MF	26 August 1999 (aged 21)	Everton	2021	2024	7	0
13	Catarina Macario	(United States)	MF	4 October 1999 (aged 21)	Stanford Cardinal	2021	2023	11	6
22	Sally Julini	(Switzerland)	MF	1 January 2003 (aged 18)	Academy	2020		3	0
	Yasmine Klai	(France)	MF	15 September 2002 (aged 18)	Academy	2017		0	0
	Marine Pierret	(France)	MF	15 October 2001 (aged 19)	Academy	2019		0	0
Forwards
9	Eugénie Le Sommer	(France)	FW	18 May 1989 (aged 32)	Stade Briochin	2010	2023	333	277
14	Ada Hegerberg	(Norway)	FW	10 July 1995 (aged 25)	Turbine Potsdam	2014		184	220
17	Nikita Parris	(England)	FW	10 March 1994 (aged 27)	Manchester City	2019	2022	48	32
19	Jéssica Silva	(Portugal)	FW	11 December 1994 (aged 26)	Levante	2019	2021	6	2
20	Delphine Cascarino	(France)	FW	5 February 1997 (aged 24)	Academy	2015	2024	147	30
25	Inès Benyahia	(France)	FW	26 March 2003 (aged 18)	Academy	2020		2	0
27	Vicki Bècho	(France)	FW	3 October 2003 (aged 17)	Paris Saint-Germain	2020		4	0
28	Melvine Malard	(France)	FW	28 June 2000 (aged 20)	Academy	2017		31	8
31	Jodie Taylor	(England)	FW	17 May 1986 (aged 35)	OL Reign	2020	2021	11	1
	Cyrine Ben Rabah	(France)	FW	27 November 2002 (aged 18)	Academy	2017		0	0
Out on loan
	Grace Kazadi	(France)	DF	31 January 2001 (aged 20)	Academy	2020		0	0
	Assimina Maoulida	(France)	DF	30 January 2002 (aged 19)	Orléans	2020		0	0
	Manon Revelli	(France)	DF	26 November 2001 (aged 19)	Academy	2019	2023	2	0
	Emelyne Laurent	(France)	FW	4 November 1998 (aged 22)	Bordeaux	2017		19	4
Left during the season
11	Shanice van de Sanden	(Netherlands)	FW	2 October 1992 (aged 28)	Liverpool	2017	2021	75	12

== Transfers ==
=== In ===
Date	Position	Nationality	Name	From	Fee	Ref.
12 January 2023	MF	(United States)	Catarina Macario	Stanford Cardinal	Undisclosed	
20 January 2023	MF	(Spain)	Damaris Egurrola	Everton	Undisclosed	

=== Loans in ===
Start date	Position	Nationality	Name	From	End date	Ref.
23 September 2020	DF	(Spain)	Celia	OL Reign	1 March 2021	

=== Out ===
Date	Position	Nationality	Name	To	Fee	Ref.
21 September 2020	FW	(Netherlands)	Shanice van de Sanden	VfL Wolfsburg	Undisclosed	

=== Loans out ===
Start date	Position	Nationality	Name	To	End date	Ref.
1 August 2020	DF	(France)	Grace Kazadi	Atlético Madrid	30 June 2021	
5 August 2020	FW	(France)	Emelyne Laurent	Atlético Madrid	30 June 2021	
6 January 2021	MF	(France)	Manon Revelli	Servette	30 June 2021	
3 February 2021	DF	(France)	Assimina Maoulida	Le Havre	30 June 2021	
5 June 2021	GK	(France)	Sarah Bouhaddi	OL Reign	31 December 2021	
5 June 2021	MF	(Germany)	Dzsenifer Marozsán	OL Reign	31 December 2021	

=== Released ===
Date	Position	Nationality	Name	Joined	Date	Ref.
30 June 2021	DF	(France)	Sakina Karchaoui	Paris Saint-Germain	10 July 2021	
30 June 2021	MF	(Japan)	Saki Kumagai	Bayern Munich	1 July 2021	
30 June 2021	FW	(England)	Jodie Taylor	Orlando Pride	8 July 2021	
30 June 2021	FW	(Portugal)	Jéssica Silva	Kansas City Current		

== Friendlies ==
v

== Competitions ==
=== Overview ===
Competition	First match	Last match	Starting round	Final position	Record							
Competition	First match	Last match	Starting round	Final position	Pld	W	D	L	GF	GA	GD	Win %
Division 1	6 September 2020	4 June 2021	Matchday 1	2nd	22	20	1	1	78	6	+72	90.91
Coupe de France	29 January 2021	29 January 2021	Round of 32	Cancelled	1	1	0	0	5	0	+5	100.00
UEFA Champions League	9 December 2020	18 April 2021	Round of 32	Quarterfinal	6	5	0	1	13	5	+8	83.33
Total					29	26	1	2	96	11	+85	89.66

Last updated: 4 June 2021
Source: Competitions

=== Division 1 ===
==== Results summary ====
Overall								Home						Away					
Pld	W	D	L	GF	GA	GD	Pts	W	D	L	GF	GA	GD	W	D	L	GF	GA	GD
22	20	1	1	78	6	+72	61	10	1	0	44	4	+40	10	0	1	34	2	+32

Last updated: 4 June 2021.

==== Results by matchday ====
Matchday	1	2	3	4	5	6	7	8	9	10	11	12	13	14	15	16	17	18	19	20	21	22
Ground	H	A	H	A	H	H	A	H	A	A	H	H	A	H	A	A	A	H	A	A	H	H
Result	W	W	W	W	W	W	W	W	L	W	W	W	W	W	W	W	W	W	W	W	D	W
Position	2	1	1	1	1	1	1	1	2	2	2	2	2	2	2	2	2	2	2	2	2	2

Updated to match(es) played on 4 June 2021. Source: Results
A = Away; H = Home; W = Win; D = Draw; L = Loss; P = Postponed

==== Results ====
6 September 2020 1	Olympique Lyonnais	4–0	Paris FC	Décines-Charpieu
17:00 CEST (UTC+2)	Renard 56' (pen.); Kumagai 68', 86'; Le Sommer 75' (pen.)	Report	Matéo (yellow card) 90+2'	Stadium: Stade Gérard Houllier; Referee: Victoria Beyer

11 September 2020 2	Stade Reims	0–3	Olympique Lyonnais	Reims
18:30 CEST (UTC+2)	Philippe (yellow card) 84'	Report	Parris 9'; Buchanan (yellow card) 28'; Kravets 45+1' (o.g.); Cayman 47'; Majri (penalty missed) 58'; Bacha (red card) 90+4'	Stadium: Stade Auguste-Delaune II; Referee: Justine Catania

27 September 2020 3	Olympique Lyonnais	2–1	Girondins Bordeaux	Décines-Charpieu
21:00 CEST (UTC+2)	Carpenter 42'; Le Sommer 57'	Report	Lavogez (yellow card) 33'; Chatelin (yellow card) 70'; Sarr 72'	Stadium: Stade Gérard Houllier; Referee: Alexandra Collin

2 October 2020 4	Fleury 91	0–3	Olympique Lyonnais	Fleury-Mérogis
18:30 CEST (UTC+2)	Fernandes (yellow card) 17'; Sissoko (yellow card) 30'	Report	Le Sommer (yellow card) 64'; Malard 68'; Renard 79'; Parris 85'	Stadium: Terrain Walter Felder; Referee: Charlene Laur

11 October 2020 5	Olympique Lyonnais	2–0	Dijon FCO	Décines-Charpieu
17:00 CEST (UTC+2)	Parris 31'; Renard 87' (pen.)	Report	Gordon (yellow card) 5'; Daniel (yellow card) 76'; Cuynet (yellow card) 90+3'	Stadium: Stade Gérard Houllier; Referee: Victoria Beyer

16 October 2020 6	Olympique Lyonnais	4–0	Guingamp	Décines-Charpieu
20:45 CEST (UTC+2)	Henry 37'; Parris (yellow card) 64'; Majri 70' (yellow card) 86'; Gunnarsdóttir 73'; Marozsán 81'	Report	Durand (yellow card) 25'; Traoré (yellow card) 90'; Lahmari (yellow card) 90+3'	Stadium: Stade Gérard Houllier; Referee: Romy Fournier

31 October 2020 7	Montpellier	0–5	Olympique Lyonnais	Montpellier
21:00 CET (UTC+1)	Lažeta (yellow card) 60'; Škorvánková (yellow card) 66'	Report	Marozsán 5'; Henry 7'; Le Sommer 21'; Gunnarsdóttir 72'; Buchanan 90+3'	Stadium: Stade Bernard Gasset; Referee: Elodie Coppola

13 November 2020 8	Olympique Lyonnais	5–1	Soyaux	Décines-Charpieu
18:30 CET (UTC+1)	Marozsán 20'; Renard (penalty missed) 26' 27' (yellow card) 55'; Parris 43', 62'; Buchanan 79'	Report	Cazeau (yellow card) 16'; Avant (yellow card) 51' (goal) 56'; Stapelfeldt (yellow card) 83'	Stadium: Stade Gérard Houllier; Referee: Alexandra Collin

20 November 2020 9	Paris Saint-Germain	1–0	Olympique Lyonnais	Paris
21:00 CET (UTC+1)	Katoto 10'; Lawrence (yellow card) 16'	Report	Kumagai (yellow card) 13'; Henry (yellow card) 60'; Renard (yellow card) 72'	Stadium: Parc des Princes; Referee: Maika Vanderstichel

5 December 2020 10	Le Havre	1–3	Olympique Lyonnais	Le Havre
14:30 CET (UTC+1)	Koui 42'; Davis (yellow card) 45+1'	Report	Renard 5'; Kumagai 11'; Majri 18'	Stadium: Stade Océane; Referee: Gabrielle Guillot

12 December 2020 11	Olympique Lyonnais	9–0	Issy	Décines-Charpieu
14:30 CET (UTC+1)	Majri 9', 42', 52' (penalty missed) 51'; Parris 15', 18', 21', 41'; Cayman 30'; Cascarino 72'	Report	Borgella (yellow card) 17'	Stadium: Stade Gérard Houllier; Referee: Justine Catania

15 January 2021 12	Olympique Lyonnais	3–0	Stade Reims	Décines-Charpieu
18:45 CET (UTC+1)	Renard 47', 64'; Henry 90+1'	Report	Philippe (yellow card) 29'	Stadium: Stade Gérard Houllier; Referee: Victoria Beyer

22 January 2021 13	Paris FC	0–5	Olympique Lyonnais	Bondoufle
18:30 CET (UTC+1)	Savin (yellow card) 18'; Thiney (yellow card) 54'; Binaté (yellow card) 90'	Report	Marozsán 7'; Parris 11', 66'; Majri 33'; Malard (yellow card) 68'; Renard 73' (yellow card) 80'	Stadium: Stade Robert Bobin; Referee: Romy Fournier

6 February 2021 14	Olympique Lyonnais	2–1	Montpellier	Décines-Charpieu
15:15 CET (UTC+1)	Marozsán (penalty missed) 4'; Henry 4'; De Almeida 40'	Report	Le Bihan 6'; Pankratz (yellow card) 25'; Mondésir (yellow card) 39'	Stadium: Stade Gérard Houllier; Referee: Maika Vanderstichel

27 February 2021 15	Soyaux	0–2	Olympique Lyonnais	Angoulême
15:15 CET (UTC+1)	Léger (yellow card) 53'	Report	Gunnarsdóttir 27'; Marozsán 87' (pen.)	Stadium: Stade Camille Lebon; Referee: Savina Elbour

27 March 2021 17	Dijon FCO	0–3	Olympique Lyonnais	Dijon
18:45 CEST (UTC+2)	Bonet (yellow card) 82'	Report	Kumagai 24'; Renard (penalty missed) 42'; Macario 55'; Malard 79'; Marozsán (yellow card) 84'	Stadium: Stade Gaston Gérard; Referee: Maika Vanderstichel

24 April 2021 18	Guingamp	0–5	Olympique Lyonnais	Guingamp
15:15 CEST (UTC+2)	Lahmari (yellow card) 25'; Traoré (yellow card) 86'	Report	Henry 10'; Macario 14'; Cascarino 22' (yellow card) 40'; Brock 68' (o.g.); Buchanan (yellow card) 71'; Malard 89'	Stadium: Stade de Roudourou; Referee: Savina Elbour

30 April 2021 19	Olympique Lyonnais	5–1	Le Havre	Décines-Charpieu
18:30 CEST (UTC+2)	Henry 4'; Majri 20'; Renard 34' (pen.); Le Sommer 53'; Macario 79'; Bacha (yellow card) 89'	Report	Louis (yellow card) 16'; Þorvaldsdóttir 22'; Hauksdóttir (yellow card) 61'; Kristjánsdóttir (yellow card) 78'	Stadium: Stade Gérard Houllier; Referee: Charlene Laur

9 May 2021 20	Issy	0–4	Olympique Lyonnais	Boulogne-Billancourt
17:30 CEST (UTC+2)	Mills (yellow card) 73'	Report	Majri 10' (pen.); Macario 32', 42'; Le Sommer 56'	Stadium: Stade Le Gallo; Referee: Emeline Rochebilière

21 May 2021 21	Girondins Bordeaux	0–1	Olympique Lyonnais	Libourne
20:45 CEST (UTC+2)	Cascarino (yellow card) 47'	Report	Le Sommer 9'; Marozsán (yellow card) 52'; Kumagai (yellow card) 87'	Stadium: Stade Jean-Antoine Moueix; Referee: Alexandra Collin

30 May 2021 16	Olympique Lyonnais	0–0	Paris Saint-Germain	Décines-Charpieu
21:00 CEST (UTC+2)		Report	Baltimore (yellow card) 35'; Paredes (yellow card) 57'; Lawrence (yellow card) 67'	Stadium: Parc Olympique Lyonnais; Referee: Stephanie Frappart

4 June 2021 22	Olympique Lyonnais	8–0	Fleury 91	Décines-Charpieu
20:45 CEST (UTC+2)	Majri 15'; Malard 26'; Parris 32', 54'; Renard 65'; Le Sommer 81'; Taylor 84'; Buchanan 90+2'	Report		Stadium: Stade Gérard Houllier; Referee: Savina Elbour

==== Table ====
Pos	Team	Pld	W	D	L	GF	GA	GD	Pts	Qualification or relegation
1	Paris Saint-Germain (C)	22	20	2	0	83	4	+79	62	Qualification for the Champions League group stage
2	Lyon	22	20	1	1	78	6	+72	61	Qualification for the Champions League second round
3	Bordeaux	22	14	2	6	50	23	+27	44	Qualification for the Champions League first round
4	Paris FC	22	11	4	7	39	29	+10	37	
5	Guingamp	22	9	4	9	29	32	−3	31	
6	Reims	22	9	3	10	34	42	−8	30 (Note: Reims finished ahead of Montpellier on head-to-head goal difference: Reims 0–1 Montpellier, Montpellier 0–4 Reims.)	
7	Montpellier	22	9	3	10	27	35	−8	30	
8	Dijon	22	8	2	12	24	37	−13	26	
9	Fleury	22	7	4	11	18	42	−24	25	
10	Soyaux	22	5	2	15	15	46	−31	17	
11	Issy	22	3	1	18	11	77	−66	10	
12	Le Havre (R)	22	2	2	18	14	49	−35	8	Relegation to Division 2 Féminine

Rules for classification: 1) points; 2) head-to-head points; 3) head-to-head goal difference; 4) goal difference; 5) goals scored
(C) Champions; (R) Relegated

=== Coupe de France ===
29 January 2021 Round of 32	Stade Reims	0–5	Olympique Lyonnais	Bétheny
14:30 CET (UTC+1)	Kith (yellow card) 1'; Dupupet (yellow card) 15'; Doucouré (yellow card) 19'		Marozsán 16', 51', 53'; Renard 36' (pen.); Gunnarsdóttir 49'	Stadium: Stade Louis Blériot; Referee: Justine Catania

=== UEFA Champions League ===
9 December 2020 Round of 32 1st leg	Juventus (Italy)	2–3	(France) Olympique Lyonnais	Turin, Italy
15:00 CET (UTC+1)	Hurtig 16'; Bonansea (yellow card) 29'; Buchanan 38' (o.g.); Caruso (yellow card) 44'	Report	Buchanan (yellow card) 5'; Renard 30' (pen.); Malard 68'; Kumagai 88'	Stadium: Juventus Stadium; Attendance: 0 Referee: Riem Hussein (Germany)

15 December 2020 Round of 32 2nd leg	Olympique Lyonnais (France)	3–0 (6–2 agg.)	(Italy) Juventus	Décines-Charpieu, France
19:00 CET (UTC+1)	Kumagai (yellow card) 2'; Henry (yellow card) 12'; Marozsán 21' (yellow card) 73'; Malard 88'; Cayman 90+1'	Report		Stadium: Parc Olympique Lyonnais; Attendance: 0 Referee: Sara Persson (Sweden)

4 March 2021 Round of 16 1st leg	Olympique Lyonnais (France)	2–0	(Denmark) Brøndby	Décines-Charpieu, France
16:00 CEST (UTC+2)	Renard (yellow card) 5'; Parris 30'; Malard 90+3' (yellow card) 90+4'	Report		Stadium: Parc Olympique Lyonnais; Attendance: 0 Referee: Henrikke Nervik (Norway)

10 March 2021 Round of 16 2nd leg	Brøndby (Denmark)	1–3 (1–5 agg.)	(France) Olympique Lyonnais	Brøndby
13:55 CET (UTC+1)	Christiansen 11'; Lindhardt (yellow card) 45+2'; Kildemoes (yellow card) 49'	Report	Parris 32'; Malard 42'; Renard 50' (pen.)	Stadium: Brøndby Stadium; Attendance: 0 Referee: Ivana Martinčić (Croatia)

24 March 2021 Quarterfinal 1st leg	Paris Saint-Germain (France)	0–1	(France) Olympique Lyonnais	Paris, France
18:00 CET (UTC+1)	Paredes (yellow card) 47'; Bruun (yellow card) 90+2'	Report	Majri (yellow card) 7'; Renard 86' (pen.); Karchaoui (yellow card) 90+4'	Stadium: Parc des Princes; Attendance: 0 Referee: Esther Staubli (Switzerland)

18 April 2021 Quarterfinal 2nd leg	Olympique Lyonnais (France)	1–2 (2–2 (a) agg.)	(France) Paris Saint-Germain	Décines-Charpieu, France
14:00 CEST (UTC+2)	Macario 4'; Henry (yellow card) 73'; Bacha (yellow card) 90+1'	Report	Geyoro 25'; Renard 61' (o.g.); Morroni (yellow card) 65'	Stadium: Parc Olympique Lyonnais; Attendance: 0 Referee: Ivana Martinčić (Croatia)
Note: The match was originally scheduled to be played on 1 April 2021, but was postponed due to positive COVID-19 tests by Lyon players.

== Squad statistics ==
As of match played 4 June 2021

=== Appearances ===
No.	Pos	Nat	Player	Total		Division 1		Coupe de France		UEFA Champions League	
No.	Pos	Nat	Player	Apps	Goals	Apps	Goals	Apps	Goals	Apps	Goals
1	GK	(Spain) ESP	Lola Gallardo	4	0	3	0	1	0	0	0
3	DF	(France) FRA	Wendie Renard	26	14	20	10	1	1	5	3
4	DF	(France) FRA	Selma Bacha	16	0	7+3	0	1	0	3+2	0
5	MF	(Japan) JPN	Saki Kumagai	24	5	12+5	4	1	0	4+2	1
6	MF	(France) FRA	Amandine Henry	25	6	17+2	6	1	0	2+3	0
7	MF	(France) FRA	Amel Majri	24	9	16+1	9	0+1	0	5+1	0
8	MF	(Iceland) ISL	Sara Gunnarsdóttir	17	4	8+4	3	1	1	3+1	0
9	FW	(France) FRA	Eugénie Le Sommer	22	7	14+4	7	0+1	0	0+3	0
10	MF	(Germany) GER	Dzsenifer Marozsán	29	9	21+1	5	1	3	6	1
11	MF	(Spain) ESP	Damaris Egurrola	7	0	1+1	0	0+1	0	2+2	0
12	DF	(Australia) AUS	Ellie Carpenter	24	1	17+1	1	1	0	5	0
13	MF	(United States) USA	Catarina Macario	11	6	6+1	5	0	0	2+2	1
16	GK	(France) FRA	Sarah Bouhaddi	25	0	19	0	0	0	6	0
17	FW	(England) ENG	Nikita Parris	27	15	13+7	13	1	0	6	2
20	FW	(France) FRA	Delphine Cascarino	27	2	18+3	2	1	0	5	0
21	DF	(Canada) CAN	Kadeisha Buchanan	27	3	20	3	0+1	0	6	0
22	MF	(Switzerland) SUI	Sally Julini	3	0	0+2	0	0	0	0+1	0
23	DF	(Belgium) BEL	Janice Cayman	16	3	6+5	2	0	0	1+4	1
25	FW	(France) FRA	Inès Benyahia	2	0	1+1	0	0	0	0	0
26	DF	(France) FRA	Sakina Karchaoui	24	0	16+2	0	1	0	4+1	0
27	FW	(France) FRA	Vicki Bècho	4	0	0+3	0	0	0	0+1	0
28	FW	(France) FRA	Melvine Malard	26	8	6+14	4	0	0	1+5	4
31	FW	(England) ENG	Jodie Taylor	8	1	1+5	1	0	0	0+2	0
Players away from the club on loan:
Players who appeared for Olympique Lyonnais but left during the season:
11	FW	(Netherlands) NED	Shanice van de Sanden	1	0	0+1	0	0	0	0	0

=== Goal scorers ===
Place	Position	Nation	Number	Name	Division 1	Coupe de France	UEFA Champions League	Total
1	FW	(England)	17	Nikita Parris	13	0	2	15
2	DF	(France)	3	Wendie Renard	10	1	3	14
3	MF	(France)	7	Amel Majri	9	0	0	9
3	MF	(Germany)	10	Dzsenifer Marozsán	5	3	1	9
5	FW	(France)	28	Melvine Malard	4	0	4	8
6	FW	(France)	9	Eugénie Le Sommer	7	0	0	7
7	MF	(France)	6	Amandine Henry	6	0	0	6
7	MF	(United States)	13	Catarina Macario	5	0	1	6
9	MF	(Japan)	5	Saki Kumagai	4	0	1	5
10	MF	(Iceland)	8	Sara Gunnarsdóttir	3	1	0	4
11	DF	(Canada)	21	Kadeisha Buchanan	3	0	0	3
11	DF	(Belgium)	23	Janice Cayman	2	0	1	3
11				Own goal	3	0	0	3
14	FW	(France)	20	Delphine Cascarino	2	0	0	2
15	DF	(Australia)	12	Ellie Carpenter	1	0	0	1
15	FW	(England)	31	Jodie Taylor	1	0	1	
Total					78	5	13	96

=== Clean sheets ===
Place	Position	Nation	Number	Name	Division 1	Coupe de France	UEFA Champions League	Total
1	GK	(France)	16	Sarah Bouhaddi	14	0	3	17
2	GK	(Germany)	1	Lola Gallardo	2	1	0	3
Total					16	1	3	20

=== Disciplinary record ===
Number	Nation	Position	Name	Division 1		Coupe de France		UEFA Champions League		Total	
Number	Nation	Position	Name	Booked	Sent off (straight red)	Booked	Sent off (straight red)	Booked	Sent off (straight red)	Booked	Sent off (straight red)
3	(France)	DF	Wendie Renard	3	0	0	0	1	0	4	0
4	(France)	DF	Selma Bacha	1	1	0	0	1	0	2	1
5	(Japan)	MF	Saki Kumagai	2	0	0	0	1	0	3	0
6	(France)	MF	Amandine Henry	1	0	0	0	2	0	3	0
7	(France)	MF	Amel Majri	1	0	0	0	1	0	2	0
9	(France)	FW	Eugénie Le Sommer	1	0	0	0	0	0	1	0
10	(Germany)	MF	Dzsenifer Marozsán	2	0	0	0	1	0	3	0
17	(England)	FW	Nikita Parris	1	0	0	0	0	0	1	0
20	(France)	FW	Delphine Cascarino	1	0	0	0	0	0	1	0
21	(Canada)	DF	Kadeisha Buchanan	2	0	0	0	1	0	3	0
26	(France)	DF	Sakina Karchaoui	0	0	0	0	1	0	1	0
28	(France)	FW	Melvine Malard	1	0	0	0	1	0	2	0
Players away on loan:
Players who left Olympique Lyonnais during the season:
Total				16	1	0	0	10	0	26	1
