= 2022–23 Olympique Lyonnais Féminin season =

Olympique Lyonnais Féminin
2022–23 season
- Manager: Sonia Bompastor
- Stadium: Groupama OL Training Center
- Division 1: Champions
- Coupe de France: Champions
- Trophée des Championnes: Champions
- UEFA Champions League: Quarterfinal vs Chelsea
- Top goalscorer: League: Signe Bruun (8); All: Signe Bruun (10)
Home colours	Away colours	Third colours

The 2022–23 Olympique Lyonnais Féminin season was the club's nineteenth season since FC Lyon joined OL as its women's section. Olympique Lyonnais finished the season as Champions of the Division 1 Féminine, Coupe de France and Trophée des Championnes, whilst they were knocked out of the UEFA Champions League by Chelsea in the Quarterfinals.

== Season events ==
On 8 June, Olympique Lyonnais announced the singing of Sara Däbritz from Paris Saint-Germain on a contract until the summer of 2025.

On 28 June, Olympique Lyonnais extended their contract with Ellie Carpenter until 30 June 2026, and with Kysha Sylla until 30 June 2025.

On 18 July, Olympique Lyonnais announced the signing of Inès Jaurena from Girondins de Bordeaux to a one-year contract.

On 21 July, Olympique Lyonnais extended their contract with Amel Majri until 30 June 2026. The following day 22 July, Alyssia Paljevic extended her contract with Olympique Lyonnais until 30 June 2023.

On 27 July, Grace Kazadi left Olympique Lyonnais to sign for Guingamp.

On 9 August, Manon Revelli joined Guingamp whilst Sally Julini also joined Guingamp on loan.

On 19 September, Olympique Lyonnais announced the signing of Vanessa Gilles on loan from Angel City until 30 June 2023.

On 16 January, Olympique Lyonnais announced the signing of Melchie Dumornay from Stade Reims to a three-year contract starting on 1 July 2023.

On 17 January, Olympique Lyonnais announced that Alice Sombath had extended her contract with the club until 30 June 2026, and that Kysha Sylla had joined Dijon FCO on loan for the remainder of the season.

On 29 January, Olympique Lyonnais announced that Inès Jaurena had left the club after her contract was terminated by mutual agreement.

On 15 March, Daniëlle van de Donk extended her contract with Olympique Lyonnais until the summer of 2025.

On 26 April, Janice Cayman announced that she would be leaving Olympique Lyonnais at the end of the season.

On 13 May, Olympique Lyonnais won the Coupe de France féminine 2–1 over Paris Saint-Germain, its 10th victory in the competition, on a brace by Ada Hegerberg. The match was attended by Y. Michele Kang, owner of the Washington Spirit of the American National Women's Soccer League, who also raised the trophy with Lyon.

On 16 May, OL Groupe and Kang announced the formation of a separate entity that would be composed of Kang's Washington Spirit, and Olympique Lyon Féminin. OL Groupe would retain a 48% stake in the resulting new entity, and Kang would become the club's majority owner and CEO, pending regulatory approval.

On 20 May, Olympique Lyonnais announced that they had extended the loan deal with Vanessa Gilles until 30 June 2024, with an option to make the move permanent. The following day, Olympique Lyonnais secured their 16th Division 1 Féminine title with a 1–0 victory over Paris Saint-Germain at the Parc des Princes.

On 31 May, Olympique Lyonnais announced that Inès Benyahia had extended her contract with the club until 30 June 2026.

On 2 June, Janice Cayman left Olympique Lyonnais after her contract expired, with Signe Bruun also departing on 5 June and Catarina Macario on 6 June.

== Squad ==
As of match played 27 May 2023

No.	Name	Nationality	Position	Date of birth (age)	Signed from	Signed in	Contract ends	Apps.	Goals
Goalkeepers
1	Christiane Endler	(Chile)	GK	23 July 1991 (aged 31)	Paris Saint-Germain	2021	2024	60	0
30	Alyssia Paljevic	(France)	GK	22 June 2002 (aged 20)	Academy	2021	2023	1	0
40	Emma Holmgren	(Sweden)	GK	13 May 1997 (aged 26)	Eskilstuna United	2021	2023	9	0
50	Feerine Belhadj	(France)	GK	14 February 2005 (aged 18)	Academy	2022		0	0
Defenders
3	Wendie Renard (captain)	(France)	DF	20 July 1990 (aged 32)	Academy	2006	2026	457	146
4	Selma Bacha	(France)	DF	9 November 2000 (aged 22)	Academy	2017	2025	136	8
5	Perle Morroni	(France)	DF	15 October 1997 (aged 25)	Paris Saint-Germain	2021	2024	60	2
12	Ellie Carpenter	(Australia)	DF	8 April 2000 (aged 23)	Portland Thorns	2020	2026	64	1
15	Assimina Maoulida	(France)	DF	30 January 2002 (aged 21)	US Orléans	2020		0	0
18	Alice Sombath	(France)	DF	16 October 2003 (aged 19)	Paris Saint-Germain	2020	2026	39	0
21	Vanessa Gilles	(Canada)	DF	11 March 1996 (aged 27)	on loan from Angel City	2022	2024	24	4
23	Janice Cayman	(Belgium)	DF	12 October 1988 (aged 34)	Montpellier	2019	2023	80	13
29	Griedge Mbock	(France)	DF	26 February 1995 (aged 28)	Guingamp	2015	2024	163	33
	Alice Marques	(France)	DF	4 May 2005 (aged 18)	Academy	2022		0	0
Midfielders
6	Amandine Henry	(France)	MF	28 September 1989 (aged 33)	Portland Thorns	2018	2023 (+1)	354	69
7	Amel Majri	(France)	MF	25 January 1993 (aged 30)	Academy	2010	2026	264	81
8	Sara Däbritz	(Germany)	MF	15 February 1995 (aged 28)	Paris Saint-Germain	2022	2025	20	6
10	Dzsenifer Marozsán	(Germany)	MF	18 April 1992 (aged 31)	Eintracht Frankfurt	2016	2023	177	63
11	Damaris Egurrola	(Netherlands)	MF	26 August 1999 (aged 23)	Everton	2021	2024	59	4
13	Catarina Macario	(United States)	MF	4 October 1999 (aged 23)	Stanford Cardinal	2021	2023	46	30
17	Daniëlle van de Donk	(Netherlands)	MF	5 August 1991 (aged 31)	Arsenal	2021	2025	46	9
26	Lindsey Horan	(United States)	MF	26 May 1994 (aged 29)	on loan from Portland Thorns	2022	2023	37	8
34	Mélissa Bethi	(Algeria)	MF	18 November 2004 (aged 18)	Academy	2022		0	0
35	Celia Bensalem	(France)	MF	9 November 2004 (aged 18)	Academy	2021		1	0
Forwards
9	Eugénie Le Sommer	(France)	FW	18 May 1989 (aged 34)	Stade Briochin	2010	2023	375	287
14	Ada Hegerberg	(Norway)	FW	10 July 1995 (aged 27)	Turbine Potsdam	2014	2024	217	243
20	Delphine Cascarino	(France)	FW	5 February 1997 (aged 26)	Academy	2015	2024	206	41
24	Signe Bruun	(Denmark)	FW	6 April 1998 (aged 25)	Paris Saint-Germain	2021	2023	44	17
25	Inès Benyahia	(France)	FW	26 March 2003 (aged 20)	Academy	2020	2026	26	3
27	Vicki Bècho	(France)	FW	3 October 2003 (aged 19)	Paris Saint-Germain	2020		35	4
28	Melvine Malard	(France)	FW	28 June 2000 (aged 22)	Academy	2017		92	33
Out on loan
19	Kysha Sylla	(France)	MF	4 February 2004 (aged 19)	Academy	2021	2025	2	0
	Sally Julini	(Switzerland)	MF	1 January 2003 (aged 20)	Academy	2020	2024	8	1
Left during the season
2	Inès Jaurena	(France)	MF	14 May 1991 (aged 32)	Girondins de Bordeaux	2022	2023	5	0
32	Nesrine Bahlouli	(France)	MF	20 February 2003 (aged 20)	Academy	2021		2	0

=== Out on loan ===
Note: Flags indicate national team as defined under FIFA eligibility rules; some limited exceptions apply. Players may hold more than one non-FIFA nationality.

No.	Pos.	Nation	Player
19	MF	FRA	Kysha Sylla (at Dijon FCO until 30 June 2023)
—	MF	SUI	Sally Julini (at Guingamp until 30 June 2023)

== Transfers ==
=== In ===
Date	Position	Nationality	Name	From	Fee	Ref.
8 June 2022	MF	(Germany)	Sara Däbritz	Paris Saint-Germain	Undisclosed	
18 July 2022	MF	(France)	Inès Jaurena	Girondins de Bordeaux	Undisclosed	

=== Loans in ===
Start date	Position	Nationality	Name	From	End date	Ref.
27 January 2022	MF	(United States)	Lindsey Horan	Portland Thorns	30 June 2023	
19 September 2022	DF	(Canada)	Vanessa Gilles	Angel City	30 June 2023	

=== Out ===
Date	Position	Nationality	Name	To	Fee	Ref.
27 July 2022	DF	(France)	Grace Kazadi	Guingamp	Undisclosed	
9 August 2022	MF	(France)	Manon Revelli	Guingamp	Undisclosed	
20 January 2023	MF	(France)	Nesrine Bahlouli	AC Milan	Undisclosed	

=== Loans out ===
Start date	Position	Nationality	Name	To	End date	Ref.
9 August 2022	MF	(Switzerland)	Sally Julini	Guingamp	30 June 2023	
17 January 2023	MF	(France)	Kysha Sylla	Dijon FCO	30 June 2023	

=== Released ===
Date	Position	Nationality	Name	Joined	Date	Ref.
29 January 2023	MF	(France)	Inès Jaurena	Washington Spirit	7 February 2023	
1 June 2023	MF	(France)	Amandine Henry	Angel City	11 July 2023	
2 June 2023	DF	(Belgium)	Janice Cayman	Leicester City	11 July 2023	
5 June 2023	FW	(Denmark)	Signe Bruun	Real Madrid	10 July 2023	
6 June 2023	MF	(United States)	Catarina Macario	Chelsea	9 June 2023	
30 June 2023	FW	(France)	Celia Bensalem			

== Friendlies ==
v

== Competitions ==
=== Overview ===
Competition	First match	Last match	Starting round	Final position	Record							
Competition	First match	Last match	Starting round	Final position	Pld	W	D	L	GF	GA	GD	Win %
Division 1	11 September 2022	27 May 20223	Matchday 1	Winners	22	20	1	1	69	9	+60	90.91
Coupe de France	7 January 2023	13 May 2023	Round of 64	Winners	5	4	1	0	16	3	+13	80.00
Trophée des Championnes	28 August 2022		Final	Winners	1	1	0	0	1	0	+1	100.00
UEFA Champions League	19 October 2022	30 March 2023	Group Stage	Quarterfinal	8	4	2	2	12	8	+4	50.00
Total					36	29	4	3	98	20	+78	80.56

Last updated: 27 May 2023
Source: Competitions

=== Trophée des Championnes ===
28 August 2022 Final	Olympique Lyonnais	1–0	Paris Saint-Germain	Dunkirk
21:00 CET (UTC+1)	van de Donk 13'; Morroni (yellow card) 29'	Report		Stadium: Stade Marcel-Tribut; Referee: Emeline Rochebiliere

=== Division 1 ===
==== Results summary ====
Overall								Home						Away					
Pld	W	D	L	GF	GA	GD	Pts	W	D	L	GF	GA	GD	W	D	L	GF	GA	GD
22	20	1	1	69	9	+60	61	10	0	1	34	3	+31	10	1	0	35	6	+29

Last updated: 27 May 2023.

==== Results by matchday ====
Matchday	1	2	3	4	5	6	7	8	9	10	11	12	13	14	15	16	17	18	19	20	21	22
Ground	A	H	A	H	A	H	A	H	A	H	H	A	H	A	H	A	H	A	H	A	A	H
Result	W	W	W	W	W	W	D	W	W	W	L	W	W	W	W	W	W	W	W	W	W	W
Position	1	2	1	1	1	1	1	1	1	1	2	2	1	1	1	1	1	1	1	1	1	1

Updated to match(es) played on 27 May 2023. Source: Results
A = Away; H = Home; W = Win; D = Draw; L = Loss; P = Postponed

==== Results ====
11 September 2022 1	Stade de Reims	1–5	Olympique Lyonnais	Reims
12:45 CEST (UTC+2)	Doucouré (yellow card) 54'; Dumornay 63'	Report	van de Donk 16', 85'; Egurrola 39'; Däbritz 72'; Le Sommer (yellow card) 87'; Malard 90+4'	Stadium: Stade Auguste-Delaune; Referee: Siham Benmahammed

18 September 2022 2	Olympique Lyonnais	2–1	Soyaux-Charente	Décines-Charpieu
15:00 CEST (UTC+2)	Horan 32'; Henry (yellow card) 39'; Däbritz (yellow card) 45'; Cascarino 77'; Benyahia (yellow card) 83'	Report	Couturier (yellow card) 43'; Gbogou 90+3'	Stadium: Stade Gerard Houllier; Referee: Romy Fournier

23 September 2022 3	Montpellier	1–3	Olympique Lyonnais	Montpellier
21:00 CEST (UTC+2)	Mondésir (yellow card) 52'; Robert 74' (pen.); Bilbault (yellow card) 90+1'	Report	Renard (yellow card) 20'; Horan (yellow card) 23' (goal) 33'; Henry (yellow card) 55'; Le Sommer 71' van de Donk 83'	Stadium: Bernard Gasset Stadium; Referee: Alexandra Collin

1 October 2022 4	Olympique Lyonnais	2–0	Rodez AF	Décines-Charpieu
14:30 CEST (UTC+2)	Cascarino 5'; Egurrola (yellow card) 24'; Le Sommer 32'	Report	Bornes (yellow card) 22'; Barbance (yellow card) 42'; Canon (yellow card) 44'	Stadium: Groupama OL Training Center; Referee: Victoria Beyer

16 October 2022 5	Girondins de Bordeaux	1–3	Olympique Lyonnais	Bordeaux
12:45 CEST (UTC+2)	Malard 10' (o.g.)	Report	Horan 5'; Renard 14'; Bècho (yellow card) 25'; Malard 44'; Jaurena (yellow card) 46'; Bacha (yellow card) 69'	Stadium: Stade Sainte-Germaine; Referee: Clemence Goncalves

30 October 2022 6	Olympique Lyonnais	1–0	Fleury 91	Décines-Charpieu
12:45 CET (UTC+1)	Renard 90+2'	Report	Kouassi (yellow card) 14' (yellow-red card) 25'; Meffometou (yellow card) 80'	Stadium: Stade Gerard Houllier; Referee: Emeline Rochebiliere

5 November 2022 7	Guingamp	0–0	Olympique Lyonnais	Pabu
14:30 CET (UTC+1)	Léger (yellow card) 29'; Perrault (yellow card) 87'	Report	Morroni (yellow card) 35'; Gilles (yellow card) 60'; Cascarino (yellow card) 82'	Stadium: Stade Centre Formation EAG 1 Referee: Aurelie Efe

20 November 2022 8	Olympique Lyonnais	1–0	Le Havre	Décines-Charpieu
16:00 CET (UTC+1)	Horan 49'	Report	Rueda (yellow card) 46'; Ali Nadjim (yellow card) 72'	Stadium: Stade Gerard Houllier; Referee: Audrey Gerbel

27 November 2022 9	Paris FC	2–3	Olympique Lyonnais	Paris
16:00 CET (UTC+1)	Bourdieu 19', 46'; Soyer (yellow card) 65'	Report	Renard 17', 70'; Cascarino 80'; Morroni (yellow card) 90+2'	Stadium: Stade Sébastien Charléty; Referee: Savina El Bour

3 December 2022 10	Olympique Lyonnais	8–0	Dijon	Décines-Charpieu
14:30 CET (UTC+1)	Cayman 9'; Bruun 31', 42', 49'; Roth 35' (o.g.); Bacha 40', 57'; Benyahia 60' (yellow card) 79'	Report	Soleilhet (yellow card) 32'	Stadium: Stade Gerard Houllier; Referee: Clemence Goncalves

11 December 2022 11	Olympique Lyonnais	0–1	Paris Saint-Germain	Décines-Charpieu
21:00 CET (UTC+1)		Report	De Almeida (yellow card) 36'; Ilestedt (yellow card) 86'; Diani 87'	Stadium: Groupama OL Training Center; Referee: Maika Vanderstichel

14 January 2023 12	Soyaux-Charente	0–3	Olympique Lyonnais	Soyaux
14:45 CET (UTC+1)		Report	Sombath (yellow card) 28'; Gilles 36'; Henry 40'; Renard 72'	Stadium: Stade Léo Lagrange; Referee: Audrey Gerbel

21 January 2023 13	Olympique Lyonnais	2–0	Montpellier	Décines-Charpieu
21:00 CET (UTC+1)	Le Sommer 49'; Renard (yellow card) 59'; Däbritz 80'	Report		Stadium: Groupama OL Training Center; Referee: Clemence Goncalves

4 February 2023 14	Rodez AF	0–5	Olympique Lyonnais	Rodez
13:45 CET (UTC+1)		Report	Cascarino 21'; Renard 39' (pen.); Marozsán 43', 45'; Majri 58'	Stadium: Stade Paul-Lignon; Referee: Elisa Daupeux

26 February 2023 15	Olympique Lyonnais	3–0	Girondins de Bordeaux	Décines-Charpieu
14:45 CET (UTC+1)	Marozsán 37', 90'; Morroni (yellow card) 39'; Henry (yellow card) 56'; Le Sommer 77'	Report	Seguin (yellow card) 90'	Stadium: Groupama OL Training Center; Referee: Victoria Beyer

10 March 2023 16	Fleury 91	1–2	Olympique Lyonnais	Fleury-Mérogis
21:00 CET (UTC+1)	Dafeur (yellow card) 57'; Jacques (yellow card) 81'; Le Garrec 90'	Report	Däbritz 17'; Morroni (yellow card) 38'; Bacha (yellow card) 65'; Horan 80'	Stadium: Terrain Walter Felder; Referee: Siham Benmahammed

25 March 2023 17	Olympique Lyonnais	6–0	En Guingamp	Décines-Charpieu
15:00 CET (UTC+1)	Egurrola (yellow card) 9'; Bruun 10', 29'; Bècho 41'; Hegerberg 71'; Le Sommer 80' van de Donk 81'	Report		Stadium: Groupama OL Training Center; Referee: Clemence Goncalves

2 April 2023 18	Le Havre	0–7	Olympique Lyonnais	Le Havre
11:45 CEST (UTC+2)	Sumo (yellow card) 44'	Report	Cayman 10', 15'; Egurrola 32'; Bruun 42'; Däbritz 64'; Hegerberg 68'; Benyahia 70'	Stadium: Stade Océane; Referee: Alexandra Collin

16 April 2023 19	Olympique Lyonnais	2–0	Paris FC	Décines-Charpieu
15:00 CEST (UTC+2)	Gilles 15' van de Donk (yellow card) 50'; Däbritz (yellow card) 80'; Carpenter (yellow card) 85'; Bruun 89'	Report	Nnadozie (yellow card) 50'	Stadium: Groupama OL Training Center; Referee: Emeline Rochebiliere

6 May 2023 20	Dijon	0–3	Olympique Lyonnais	Dijon
13:30 CEST (UTC+2)		Report	Gilles 7'; Bècho 44'; Hegerberg 69'	Stadium: Stade des Poussots; Referee: Elisa Daupeux

21 May 2023 21	Paris Saint-Germain	0–1	Olympique Lyonnais	Paris
21:00 CEST (UTC+2)	Karchaoui (yellow card) 90'	Report	Bruun 88' van de Donk (yellow card) 88'	Stadium: Parc des Princes; Referee: Victoria Beyer

27 May 2023 22	Olympique Lyonnais	7–1	Reims	Décines-Charpieu
14:30 CEST (UTC+2)	Marozsán 2'; Renard 9'; Malard 30'; Cayman (yellow card) 45'; Majri 59'; Le Sommer 65', 80'; Hegerberg 74'	Report	Doucouré (yellow card) 27'; Demehin (yellow card) 48'; Ouchene (yellow card) 57'; Dumornay 87'	Stadium: Groupama OL Training Center; Referee: Elisa Daupeux

==== Table ====
Pos	Team	Pld	W	D	L	GF	GA	GD	Pts	Qualification or relegation
1	Lyon (C)	22	20	1	1	69	9	+60	61	Qualification for the Champions League group stage
2	Paris Saint-Germain	22	17	4	1	45	12	+33	55	Qualification for the Champions League second round
3	Paris FC	22	12	6	4	44	18	+26	42	Qualification for the Champions League first round
4	Fleury	22	11	6	5	49	20	+29	39	
5	Montpellier	22	11	4	7	37	27	+10	37	

Source: Division 1 Féminine
Rules for classification: 1) points; 2) head-to-head points; 3) head-to-head goal difference; 4) goal difference; 5) goals scored
(C) Champions

=== Coupe de France ===
7 January 2023 Round of 32	Rodez AF	0–8	Olympique Lyonnais	Rodez
14:30 CET (UTC+1)		Report	Cayman 4', 80'; Marozsán 8'; Malard 38'; Renard 49'; Le Sommer 54', 86'; Bècho (yellow card) 68' (goal) 85'	Stadium: Stade Paul-Lignon; Referee: Elisa Daupeux

28 January 2023 Round of 16	Olympique Lyonnais	2–0	Montpellier	Décines-Charpieu
16:00 CET (UTC+1)	Marozsán 19'; Cascarino 67'	Report	Elsig (yellow card) 15'; Mondésir (yellow card) 28'	Stadium: Groupama OL Training Center; Referee: Emeline Rochebiliere

4 March 2023 Quarterfinal	Reims	2–2 (7–8 p)	Olympique Lyonnais	Reims
13:45 CET (UTC+1)	Corboz 53'; Dumornay 68'	Report	Marozsán 32'; Gilles (yellow card) 40'; Däbritz 55'	Stadium: Stade Auguste-Delaune; Referee: Audrey Gerbel
	Penalties
	Dumornay (penalty scored); Eninger (penalty scored); Ngock (penalty missed); Louis (penalty scored); Pasquereau (penalty scored); Doucouré (penalty scored); Szemik (penalty missed); Chossenotte (penalty scored); Kack (penalty scored); Rastocle (penalty missed)		(penalty scored) Majri; (penalty scored) Egurrola; (penalty missed) Renard; (penalty scored) Däbritz; (penalty scored) Marozsán; (penalty scored) Cascarino; (penalty missed) Gilles; (penalty scored) Carpenter; (penalty scored) Morroni; (penalty scored) Bècho

17 March 2023 Semifinal	Olympique Lyonnais	2–0	Fleury 91	Décines-Charpieu
17:30 CET (UTC+1)	Horan 8'; Bècho 11'; Majri (yellow card) 75'	Report	Levasseur (yellow card) 42'; Kouassi (yellow card) 64'; Konan (yellow card) 64'	Stadium: Groupama OL Training Center; Referee: Victoria Beyer

13 May 2023 Final	Olympique Lyonnais	2–1	Paris Saint-Germain	Orléans
15:00 CET (UTC+1)	Hegerberg 12', 23'; Egurrola (yellow card) 73' (yellow-red card) 86'	Report	Bachmann 36'; Mengwen (yellow card) 90'	Stadium: Stade de la Source; Referee: Alexandra Collin

=== UEFA Champions League ===
==== Group stage ====
Pos	Team	Pld	W	D	L	GF	GA	GD	Pts	Qualification
1	(England) Arsenal	6	4	1	1	19	5	+14	13	Advance to Quarter-finals
2	(France) Lyon	6	3	2	1	10	6	+4	11	Advance to Quarter-finals
3	(Italy) Juventus	6	2	3	1	9	3	+6	9	
4	(Switzerland) Zürich	6	0	0	6	2	26	−24	0	

Source: UEFA
Rules for classification: Group stage tiebreakers

19 October 2022 1	Olympique Lyonnais (France)	1–5	(England) Arsenal	Décines-Charpieu, France
21:00 CEST (UTC+2)	Malard 27'; Renard (yellow card) 44'	Report	Foord 13', 67'; Maanum 23'; Mead 45+1', 69' (yellow card) 90+3'	Stadium: Parc Olympique Lyonnais; Attendance: 8,012; Referee: Ivana Projkovska (North Macedonia)

27 October 2022 2	Juventus (Italy)	1–1	(France) Olympique Lyonnais	Turin, Italy
18:45 CEST (UTC+2)	Malard 52' (o.g.)	Report	Egurrola (yellow card) 21'; Horan 23' van de Donk (yellow card) 50'; Bruun (yellow card) 79'; Bacha (yellow card) 81'	Stadium: Juventus Stadium; Attendance: 7,331; Referee: Marta Huerta de Aza (Spain)

24 November 2022 3	Zürich (Switzerland)	0–3	(France) Olympique Lyonnais	Schaffhausen, Switzerland
18:45 CET (UTC+1)		Report	Malard 4'; Bruun 35', 66'	Stadium: Wefox Arena; Attendance: 2,073; Referee: Angelika Söder (Germany)

7 December 2022 4	Olympique Lyonnais (France)	4–0	(Switzerland) Zürich	Décines-Charpieu, France
18:45 CET (UTC+1)	Horan 14'; Malard 65', 79'; Cascarino 90+4'	Report	Kim Dubs (yellow card) 17'; Vetterlein (yellow card) 37'	Stadium: Parc Olympique Lyonnais; Attendance: 7,106; Referee: Monika Mularczyk (Poland)

15 December 2022 5	Arsenal (England)	0–1	(France) Olympique Lyonnais	London, England
21:00 CET (UTC+1)	McCabe (yellow card) 84'	Report	Maanum 45+2' (o.g.)	Stadium: Emirates Stadium; Attendance: 7,711; Referee: Marta Huerta de Aza (Spain)

21 December 2022 6	Olympique Lyonnais (France)	0–0	(Italy) Juventus	Décines-Charpieu, France
18:45 CET (UTC+1)	Marozsán (yellow card) 32'; Egurrola (yellow card) 66'	Report	Bonansea (yellow card) 84'	Stadium: Parc Olympique Lyonnais; Attendance: 11,212; Referee: Jana Adámková (Czech Republic)

==== Knockout stage ====
22 March 2023 Quarterfinal 1st leg	Olympique Lyonnais (France)	0–1	(England) Chelsea	Décines-Charpieu, France
18:45 CET (UTC+1)		Report	Reiten 28'	Stadium: Parc Olympique Lyonnais; Attendance: 18,751; Referee: Tess Olofsson (Sweden)

30 March 2023 Quarterfinal 2nd leg	Chelsea (England)	1–2 (a.e.t.) (2–2 agg.) (4–3 p)	(France) Olympique Lyonnais	London, England
21:00 CEST (UTC+2)	Ingle (yellow card) 118'; Mjelde 120+8' (pen.)	Report	Gilles 77' van de Donk (yellow card) 84'; Däbritz 110'; Marozsán (yellow card) 120+1'	Stadium: Stamford Bridge; Referee: Ivana Martinčić (Croatia)
	Penalties
	Mjelde (penalty scored); Kerr (penalty scored); Fleming (penalty scored); James (penalty missed); Carter (penalty scored)		(penalty scored) Marozsán; (penalty scored) Hegerberg; (penalty missed) Renard; (penalty scored) Däbritz; (penalty missed) Horan

== Squad statistics ==
As of match played 27 May 2023

=== Appearances ===
No.	Pos	Nat	Player	Total		Division 1		Coupe de France		Trophée des Championnes		UEFA Champions League	
No.	Pos	Nat	Player	Apps	Goals	Apps	Goals	Apps	Goals	Apps	Goals	Apps	Goals
1	GK	(Chile) CHI	Christiane Endler	32	0	19	0	4	0	1	0	8	0
3	DF	(France) FRA	Wendie Renard	34	8	20+1	7	5	1	0	0	8	0
4	DF	(France) FRA	Selma Bacha	26	2	12+2	2	3	0	0+1	0	6+2	0
5	DF	(France) FRA	Perle Morroni	32	0	15+4	0	2+3	0	1	0	3+4	0
6	MF	(France) FRA	Amandine Henry	19	1	11+1	1	2+1	0	0	0	3+1	0
7	MF	(France) FRA	Amel Majri	15	2	5+5	2	1+2	0	0	0	1+1	0
8	MF	(Germany) GER	Sara Däbritz	20	6	10+2	4	3+2	1	1	0	1+1	1
9	FW	(France) FRA	Eugénie Le Sommer	30	9	11+6	7	3+2	2	0+1	0	5+2	0
10	MF	(Germany) GER	Dzsenifer Marozsán	24	8	10+4	5	4+1	3	0	0	2+3	0
11	MF	(Netherlands) NED	Damaris Egurrola	29	2	12+4	2	4+1	0	0+1	0	6+1	0
12	DF	(Australia) AUS	Ellie Carpenter	11	0	5+1	0	3	0	0	0	2	0
14	FW	(Norway) NOR	Ada Hegerberg	8	6	1+4	4	1	2	1	0	0+1	0
17	MF	(Netherlands) NED	Daniëlle van de Donk	32	5	14+5	4	1+3	0	1	1	5+3	0
18	DF	(France) FRA	Alice Sombath	25	0	16	0	1+1	0	1	0	5+1	0
19	MF	(France) FRA	Kysha Sylla	1	0	0+1	0	0	0	0	0	0	0
20	FW	(France) FRA	Delphine Cascarino	29	6	14+3	4	3+1	1	1	0	7	1
21	DF	(Canada) CAN	Vanessa Gilles	24	4	12+1	3	5	0	0	0	5+1	1
23	DF	(Belgium) BEL	Janice Cayman	24	5	8+7	3	2	2	1	0	3+3	0
24	FW	(Denmark) DEN	Signe Bruun	24	10	8+10	8	0	0	0	0	3+3	2
25	FW	(France) FRA	Inès Benyahia	17	2	3+10	2	0+1	0	0+1	0	1+1	0
26	MF	(United States) USA	Lindsey Horan	27	8	11+3	5	4	1	1	0	8	2
27	FW	(France) FRA	Vicki Bècho	31	4	8+13	2	2+3	2	0	0	0+5	0
28	FW	(France) FRA	Melvine Malard	26	8	11+5	3	1	1	1	0	5+3	4
30	GK	(France) FRA	Alyssia Paljevic	1	0	0+1	0	0	0	0	0	0	0
31	MF	(France) FRA	Nesrine Bahlouli	3	0	0+2	0	0	0	1	0	0	0
40	GK	(Sweden) SWE	Emma Holmgren	4	0	3	0	1	0	0	0	0	0
Players away from the club on loan:
Players who appeared for Olympique Lyonnais but left during the season:
2	MF	(France) FRA	Inès Jaurena	5	0	3+1	0	0	0	0	0	1	0

=== Goal scorers ===
Place	Position	Nation	Number	Name	Division 1	Coupe de France	Trophée des Championnes	UEFA Champions League	Total
1	FW	(Denmark)	24	Signe Bruun	8	0	0	2	10
2	FW	(France)	9	Eugénie Le Sommer	7	2	0	0	9
3	DF	(France)	3	Wendie Renard	7	1	0	0	8
3	MF	(Germany)	10	Dzsenifer Marozsán	5	3	0	0	8
3	MF	(United States)	26	Lindsey Horan	5	1	0	2	8
3	FW	(France)	28	Melvine Malard	3	1	0	4	8
7	FW	(Norway)	14	Ada Hegerberg	4	2	0	0	6
7	FW	(France)	20	Delphine Cascarino	4	1	0	1	6
7	MF	(Germany)	8	Sara Däbritz	4	1	0	1	6
10	MF	(Netherlands)	17	Daniëlle van de Donk	4	0	1	0	5
10	DF	(Belgium)	23	Janice Cayman	3	2	0	0	5
12	DF	(Canada)	21	Vanessa Gilles	3	0	0	1	4
12	FW	(France)	27	Vicki Bècho	2	2	0	0	4
14	DF	(France)	4	Selma Bacha	2	0	0	0	2
14	MF	(Netherlands)	11	Damaris Egurrola	2	0	0	0	2
14	FW	(France)	25	Inès Benyahia	2	0	0	0	2
14	MF	(France)	7	Amel Majri	2	0	0	0	2
14				Own goal	1	0	0	1	2
19	MF	(France)	6	Amandine Henry	1	0	0	0	1
Total					69	16	1	12	98

=== Clean sheets ===
Place	Position	Nation	Number	Name	Division 1	Coupe de France	Trophée des Championnes	UEFA Champions League	Total
1	GK	(Chile)	1	Christiane Endler	12	2	1	4	19
2	GK	(Sweden)	40	Emma Holmgren	2	1	0	0	3
Total					14	3	1	4	22

=== Disciplinary record ===
Number	Nation	Position	Name	Division 1		Coupe de France		Trophée des Championnes		UEFA Champions League		Total	
Number	Nation	Position	Name	Yellow card	Red card	Yellow card	Red card	Yellow card	Red card	Yellow card	Red card	Yellow card	Red card
3	(France)	DF	Wendie Renard	2	0	0	0	0	0	1	0	3	0
4	(France)	DF	Selma Bacha	3	0	0	0	0	0	1	0	4	0
5	(France)	DF	Perle Morroni	3	0	0	0	1	0	0	0	4	0
6	(France)	MF	Amandine Henry	3	0	0	0	0	0	0	0	3	0
7	(France)	MF	Amel Majri	0	0	1	0	0	0	0	0	1	0
8	(Germany)	MF	Sara Däbritz	2	0	0	0	0	0	0	0	2	0
9	(France)	FW	Eugénie Le Sommer	1	0	0	0	0	0	0	0	1	0
10	(Germany)	MF	Dzsenifer Marozsán	0	0	0	0	0	0	2	0	2	0
11	(Netherlands)	MF	Damaris Egurrola	2	0	2	1	0	0	2	0	6	1
12	(Australia)	DF	Ellie Carpenter	1	0	0	0	0	0	0	0	1	0
17	(Netherlands)	MF	Daniëlle van de Donk	2	0	0	0	0	0	2	0	4	0
18	(France)	DF	Alice Sombath	1	0	0	0	0	0	0	0	1	0
20	(France)	FW	Delphine Cascarino	1	0	0	0	0	0	0	0	1	0
21	(Canada)	DF	Vanessa Gilles	1	0	1	0	0	0	0	0	2	0
23	(Belgium)	DF	Janice Cayman	1	0	0	0	0	0	0	0	1	0
24	(Denmark)	DF	Signe Bruun	0	0	0	0	0	0	1	0	1	0
25	(France)	FW	Inès Benyahia	2	0	0	0	0	0	0	0	2	0
26	(United States)	MF	Lindsey Horan	1	0	0	0	0	0	0	0	1	0
27	(France)	FW	Vicki Bècho	1	0	1	0	0	0	0	0	2	0
Players away on loan:
Players who left Olympique Lyonnais during the season:
2	(France)	MF	Inès Jaurena	1	0	0	0	0	0	0	0	1	0
Total				28	0	5	1	1	0	9	0	43	1
