= Amel Majri =

French footballer (born 1993)

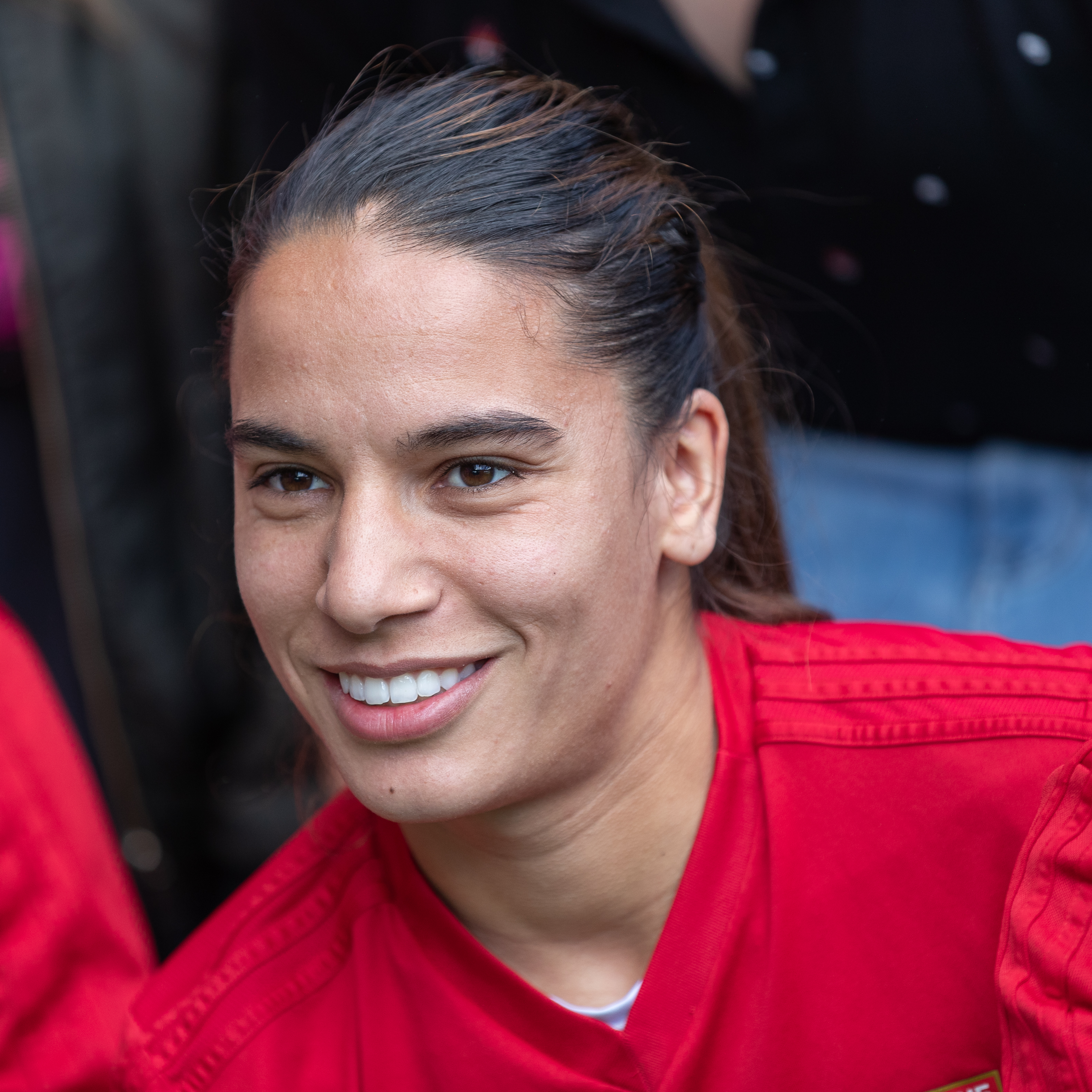
- Majri with Lyon in 2019

Personal information
- Full name: Amel Majri
- Date of birth: 25 January 1993 (age 33)
- Place of birth: Monastir, Tunisia
- Height: 1.64 m (5 ft 5 in)
- Positions: Winger; left-back

Team information
- Current team: Al-Ula
- Number: 69

Senior career*
Years	Team	Apps	(Gls)
2007–2010	Lyon B	21	(5)
2010–2025	Lyon	198	(64)
2025–	Al-Ula	1	(1)

International career
2012	Tunisia U20		
2014	France U23	2	(0)
2014–2025	France	82	(13)
Medal record
Women's football
Representing France
UEFA Women's Nations League
Runner-up	2024
- * Club domestic league appearances and goals as of 14 August 2025

Amel Majri (born 25 January 1993) is a professional footballer who plays as a winger and left-back for Saudi Women's Premier League club Al-Ula. With Lyon, she has won thirteen league titles and eight UEFA Women's Champions League titles.

Born in Tunisia, Majri moved to France at a young age. She played for the Tunisia U20s and France U23s before making her senior France debut in 2014.

== Early life ==
Majri was born in Monastir, Tunisia and moved to France at the age of 1 alongside her twin sister, Rachida, and her mother, Hafsia. They settled in Vénissieux in the residential area of Minguettes, located in the suburbs of Lyon. She returns to Tunisia every summer.

She began playing football in Tunisia at the age of 4 with her uncle. She perfected her technique using tennis balls and spent her summers on the beaches of Tunisia playing beach football. In France, she played five-a-side pick up games with boys in her neighbourhood until the age of 12, and at school. Upon seeing her play in the schoolyard, her primary school teacher insisted that she join a club, something Majri was initially against. Eventually, she joined l'AS Minguettes where she was the only girl on her team. Two years later, she was recruited by Lyon aged 14.

== Club career ==
On 13 August 2025, OL Lyonnes announced the departure of Majri at her request, and that she had signed for Al-Ula.

On 19 September 2025, Majri participated in her first match with Al-Ula in the 2025–26 Saudi Women's Premier League against NEOM, where she entered as a substitute player in the 70th minute of the second half and then scored her first goal in the 83rd minute from a penalty kick, so the match ended in a 1–1 draw at Prince Mohammed Bin Abdulaziz Sports City in Medina.

== Personal life ==
Majri is a Muslim. She got married in 2012.

Majri gave birth to a daughter, Maryam, in July 2022. Majri returned to playing football in December 2022 after five months away and became the first woman French international to report for duty with a young child. She brought her daughter to training at Clairefontaine before the 2023 World Cup.

== Career statistics ==
=== Club ===
As of match played 16 May 2025

Appearances and goals by club, season and competition
Club	Season	League		Cup		Continental		Other		Total	
Club	Season	Apps	Goals	Apps	Goals	Apps	Goals	Apps	Goals	Apps	Goals
Lyon	2010–11	4	1	1	0	–		–		5	1
Lyon	2011–12	3	1	1	0	2	1	0	0	6	2
Lyon	2012–13	9	0	4	1	4	2	0	0	17	3
Lyon	2013–14	11	0	3	0	2	0	0	0	16	0
Lyon	2014–15	20	8	5	3	3	0	0	0	28	11
Lyon	2015–16	17	4	5	3	8	1	0	0	30	8
Lyon	2016–17	18	6	2	1	8	0	0	0	28	7
Lyon	2017–18	19	3	4	3	9	3	0	0	32	9
Lyon	2018–19	18	10	4	1	9	5	2	0	33	16
Lyon	2019–20	14	5	5	0	6	2	3	1	28	8
Lyon	2020–21	17	10	1	0	6	0	0	0	24	10
Lyon	2021–22	5	2	0	0	2	1	0	0	7	3
Lyon	2022–23	10	2	3	0	2	0	0	0	15	2
Lyon	2023–24	20	5	4	1	10	4	1	0	35	10
Lyon	2024–25	15	7	0	0	8	0	0	0	23	7
Career total		200	64	42	13	79	19	6	1	327	97

=== International ===
As of match played 19 July 2025

Appearances and goals by national team and year
National team	Year	Apps	Goals
France	2014	5	1
France	2015	9	1
France	2016	13	2
France	2017	7	0
France	2018	8	0
France	2019	13	4
France	2020	6	1
France	2021	5	2
France	2023	7	0
France	2024	2	1
France	2025	7	1
Total		82	13

Scores and results list France's goal tally first, score column indicates score after each Majri goal.

List of international goals scored by Amel Majri
No.	Date	Venue	Opponent	Score	Result	Competition
1	7 May 2014	Stade Léo Lagrange, Besançon, France	Hungary	4–0	4–0	2015 FIFA Women's World Cup qualification
2	27 October 2015	Arena Lviv, Lviv, Ukraine	Ukraine	3–0	3–0	UEFA Women's Euro 2017 qualifying
3	11 April 2016	Stade Nungesser, Valenciennes, France	Ukraine	4–0	4–0	UEFA Women's Euro 2017 qualifying
4	3 August 2016	Mineirão, Belo Horizonte, Brazil	Colombia	4–0	4–0	2016 Summer Olympics
5	4 October 2019	Stade des Costières, Nîmes, France	Iceland	4–0	4–0	Friendly
6	9 November 2019	Nouveau Stade de Bordeaux, Bordeaux, France	Serbia	1–0	6–0	UEFA Women's Euro 2021 qualifying
7	9 November 2019	Nouveau Stade de Bordeaux, Bordeaux, France	Serbia	2–0	6–0	UEFA Women's Euro 2021 qualifying
8	9 November 2019	Nouveau Stade de Bordeaux, Bordeaux, France	Serbia	5–0	6–0	UEFA Women's Euro 2021 qualifying
9	18 November 2020	City Stadium, Subotica, Serbia	Serbia	2–0	2–0	UEFA Women's Euro 2022 qualifying
10	17 September 2021	Pampeloponnisiako Stadium, Patras, Greece	Greece	1–0	10–0	2023 FIFA Women's World Cup qualification
11	21 September 2021	Fazanerija City Stadium, Murska Sobota, Slovenia	Slovenia	3–2	3–2	2023 FIFA Women's World Cup qualification
12	30 November 2024	Stade Raymond Kopa, Angers, France	Nigeria	2–0	2–1	Friendly
13	9 July 2025	Kybunpark, St. Gallen, Switzerland	Wales	3–1	4–1	UEFA Women's Euro 2025

== Honours ==
Lyon

- Première Ligue: 2010–11, 2011–12, 2012–13, 2013–14, 2014–15, 2015–16, 2016–17, 2017–18, 2018–19, 2019–20, 2021–22, 2022–23, 2023–24
- Coupe de France Féminine: 2011–12, 2012–13, 2013–14, 2014–15, 2015–16, 2016–17, 2018–19, 2019–20, 2022–23
- Trophée des Championnes: 2019, 2023
- UEFA Women's Champions League: 2010–11, 2011–12, 2015–16, 2016–17, 2017–18, 2018–19, 2019–20, 2021–22

France

- UEFA Women's Nations League runner-up: 2023–24
- SheBelieves Cup: 2017
- Tournoi de France: 2020

Individual

- UNFP Female Player of the Year: 2015–16
- Première Ligue Player of the Month: March 2023
