= Yasmine Klai =

Tunisian footballer (born 2002)

Personal information
- Date of birth: 15 September 2002 (age 24)
- Place of birth: France
- Position: Midfielder

Team information
- Current team: Lyon Youth

Youth career
- Lyon

International career^{‡}
Years	Team	Apps	(Gls)
2021–	Tunisia	1	
- ‡ National team caps and goals as of 24 August 2021.

Yasmine Klai (Arabic: ياسمين قلاعي, born 15 September 2002) is a footballer who plays as a midfielder for the Lyon youth team. Born in France, she represents Tunisia at international level.

== International career ==
Klai has capped for Tunisia at senior level, including a 2021 Arab Women's Cup match against Lebanon on 24 August 2021.

== See also ==
- List of Tunisia women's international footballers
