= Emma Holmgren =

Swedish footballer (born 1997)

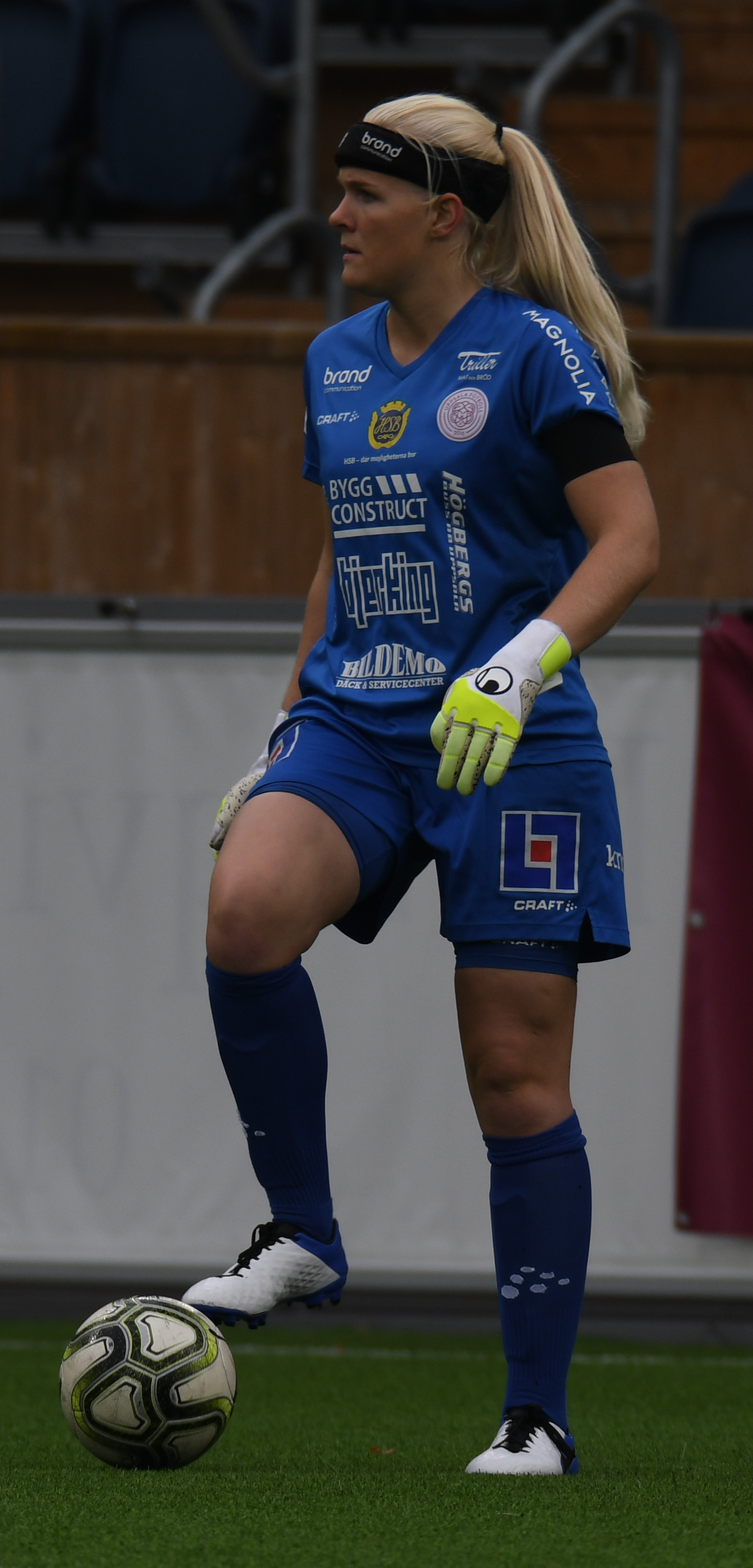
- Holmgren in 2020

Personal information
- Full name: Emma Ida Emilia Holmgren
- Date of birth: 13 May 1997 (age 29)
- Place of birth: Uppsala, Sweden
- Position: Goalkeeper

Team information
- Current team: Hammarby

Senior career*
Years	Team	Apps	(Gls)
2011	Gamlis FF	2	(1)
2012	Gamla Upsala	1	(0)
2012	→ Gamla Upsala 2 (loan)	15	(0)
2012	→ Gamla Upsala 3 (loan)	3	(2)
2013–2014	Vaksala	21	(1)
2014–2016	Sirius	53	(0)
2017–2018	Hammarby	42	(0)
2019	Linköping	18	(0)
2020	Uppsala	22	(0)
2021	Eskilstuna	12	(0)
2021–2023	Lyon	7	(0)
2023–2025	Levante UD	31	(0)
2025–	Hammarby	3	(0)

International career
2012–2013	Sweden U17	8	(0)
2014–2016	Sweden U19	15	(0)
2025–	Sweden	0	(0)
- * Club domestic league appearances and goals as of 22 November 2026

Emma Ida Emilia Holmgren (born 13 May 1997) is a Swedish footballer who plays as a goalkeeper for Hammarby in the Swedish Damallsvenskan.

== Career ==
Holmgren started her career with Swedish sixth tier side Gamlis FF. Before the 2012 season, she signed for Gamla Upsala in the Swedish fourth tier. In 2014, Holmgren signed for Swedish second tier club Sirius.

Before the 2021 season, she signed for Eskilstuna in the Swedish top flight. In 2021, she signed for French top flight team OL, helping them win the league.

== Honors ==
Lyon

- UEFA Women's Champions League: 2021–22
