= Katriina Talaslahti =

Finnish footballer (born 2000)

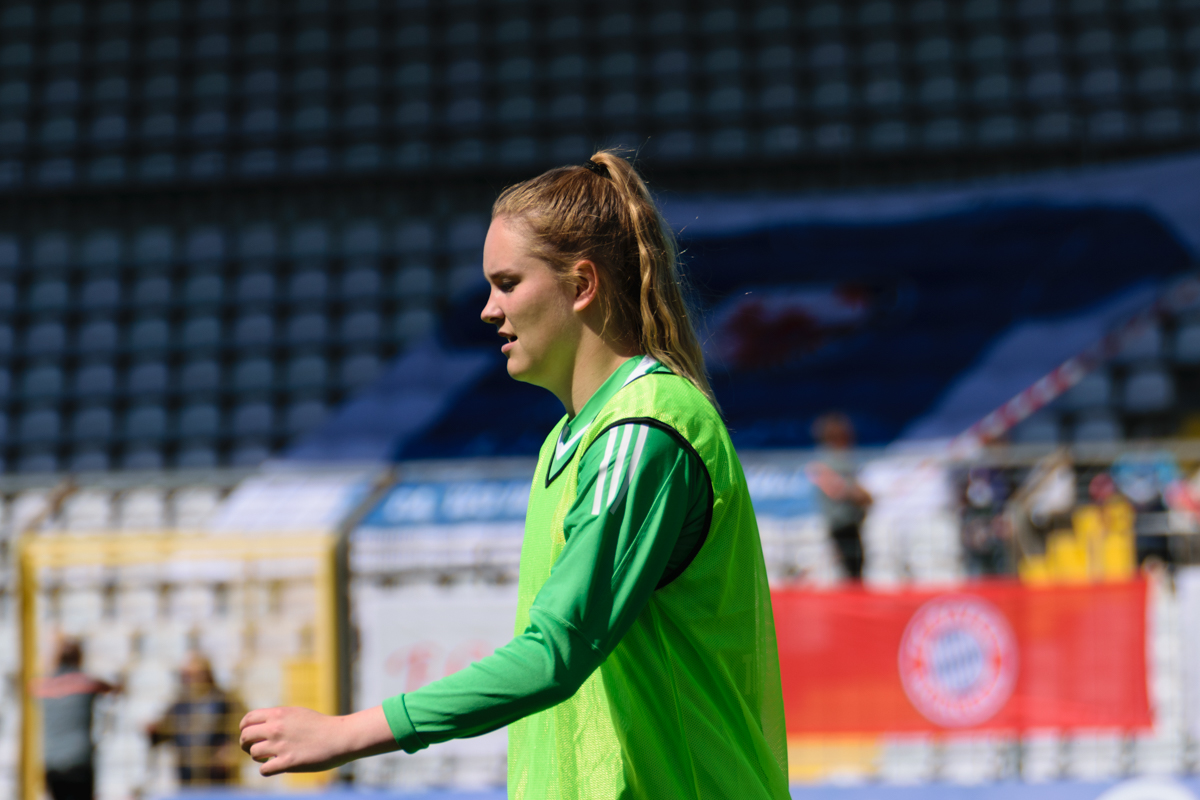
- Talaslahti in 2018

Personal information
- Full name: Katriina Talaslahti
- Date of birth: 21 September 2000 (age 26)
- Place of birth: Espoo, Finland
- Height: 1.81 m (5 ft 11 in)
- Position: Goalkeeper

Team information
- Current team: Fleury
- Number: 1

Youth career
- Leppävaaran Pallo, Espoo, Finland
- FC Honka
- 2014–2015: 1. FC Nürnberg
- 2015–2017: Bayern Munich U17

Senior career*
| Years | Team | Apps | (Gls) |
| 2017–2019 | Bayern Munich II | 24 | (0) |
| 2019 | Bayern Munich | 1 | (0) |
| 2019–2021 | Olympique Lyonnais | 0 | (0) |
| 2021–2023 | Fleury | 20 | (0) |
| 2023–2024 | Le Havre | 12 | (0) |
| 2024–2026 | Dijon FCO | 39 | (0) |
| 2026– | Fleury | 0 | (0) |

International career^{‡}
| 2015 | Finland U16 | 1 | (0) |
| 2016 | Finland U17 | 1 | (0) |
| 2018–2019 | Finland U19 | 4 | (0) |
| 2019–2023 | Finland U23 | 2 | (0) |
| 2022– | Finland | 6 | (0) |
- * Club domestic league appearances and goals as of 27 May 2026 ‡ National team caps and goals as of 11 October 2026

Katriina Talaslahti (born 21 September 2000) is a Finnish professional footballer who plays as a goalkeeper for Première Ligue club Fleury and the Finland national team.

== Club career ==
Talaslahti started her senior career with German side Bayern Munich. She made her league debut for Bayern Munich II against SC Freiburg on 9 September 2017. Shemade her league debut for Bayern Munich against SC Sand on 17 April 2019.

In 2019, she signed for Olympique Lyonnais in the French top flight. Talaslahti did not make any appearances during her time at Lyon, but was named on the bench once against Soyaux.

In 2021, she moved to Fleury. She made her league debut against Bordeaux on 12 September 2021.

On 20 July 2023, Talaslahti was announced at Le Havre. She made her league debut against Montpellier HSC on 15 December 2023.

In 2024, she moved to Dijon FCO. She made her league debut against Strasbourg on 21 September 2024.

In July 2026, Talaslahti returned to Fleury, signing a one-year deal.

== International career ==
Talaslahti made her senior team debut for Finland on 12 April 2022 in a 6–0 win against Georgia.

Talaslahti was called up to the UEFA Women's Euro 2022 squad.

== Personal life ==
Talaslahti's older sister Pauliina Talaslahti is also a footballer. Both of them played together at 1. FC Nürnberg and Bayern Munich. She can speak Finnish, English, French and German.

== Career statistics ==
=== Club ===
As of match played 6 September 2025

Appearances and goals by club, season and competition
| Club | Season | League | | | National cup (Note: Includes Coupe de France Féminine) | | Other | | Total | |
| Club | Season | Division | Apps | Goals | Apps | Goals | Apps | Goals | Apps | Goals |
|---|---|---|---|---|---|---|---|---|---|---|
| Bayern Munich II | 2017–18 | 2. Frauen-Bundesliga | 9 | 0 | – | | – | | 9 | 0 |
| Bayern Munich II | 2018–19 | 2. Frauen-Bundesliga | 15 | 0 | – | | – | | 15 | 0 |
| Bayern Munich II | Total | | 24 | 0 | 0 | 0 | 0 | 0 | 24 | 0 |
| Bayern Munich | 2018–19 | Frauen-Bundesliga | 1 | 0 | 0 | 0 | 0 | 0 | 1 | 0 |
| Lyon | 2019–20 | Division 1 Féminine | 0 | 0 | 0 | 0 | – | | 0 | 0 |
| Lyon | 2020–21 | Division 1 Féminine | 0 | 0 | 0 | 0 | 1 (Note: Includes Trophée Veolia (football)) | 0 | 1 | 0 |
| Lyon | Total | | 0 | 0 | 0 | 0 | 1 | 0 | 1 | 0 |
| Fleury 91 | 2021–22 | Division 1 Féminine | 14 | 0 | 3 | 0 | – | | 17 | 0 |
| Fleury 91 | 2022–23 | Division 1 Féminine | 0 | 0 | 3 | 0 | – | | 3 | 0 |
| Fleury 91 | Total | | 14 | 0 | 6 | 0 | 0 | 0 | 20 | 0 |
| Le Havre | 2023–24 | Division 1 Féminine | 12 | 0 | 0 | 0 | – | | 12 | 0 |
| Dijon | 2024–25 | Première Ligue | 16 | 0 | 0 | 0 | – | | 16 | 0 |
| Dijon | 2025–26 | Première Ligue | 1 | 0 | 0 | 0 | – | | 1 | 0 |
| Dijon | Total | | 17 | 0 | 0 | 0 | – | | 17 | 0 |
| Career total | | | 68 | 0 | 6 | 0 | 1 | 0 | 75 | 0 |

=== International ===
As of 16 July 2022

Appearances and goals by national team and year
| National team | Year | Apps | Goals |
|---|---|---|---|
Finland
| Finland | 2022 | 2 | 0 |
| Total | | 2 | 0 |

== Honours ==
Bayern Munich II

- 2. Frauen-Bundesliga: 2018–19

Lyon

- Coupe de France féminine: 2019–20
- UEFA Women's Champions League: 2019–20
