= Damaris Egurrola =

Dutch footballer (born 1999)

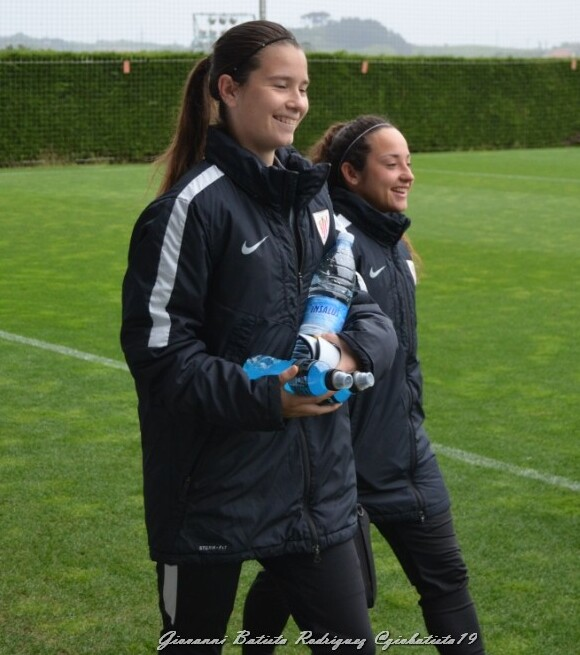
- Egurrola (left) with Athletic Club, 2017

Personal information
- Full name: Damaris Berta Egurrola Wienke
- Date of birth: 26 August 1999 (age 27)
- Place of birth: Orlando, Florida, United States
- Height: 1.75 m (5 ft 9 in)
- Position: Defensive midfielder

Team information
- Current team: Lyon
- Number: 13

Youth career
- 2011–2013: Lumo
- 2013–2014: Betiko Neskak (eu)

Senior career*
Years	Team	Apps	(Gls)
2014–2016	Athletic Club B	25	(9)
2015–2020	Athletic Club	104	(4)
2020–2021	Everton	6	(0)
2021–	Lyon	88	(10)

International career^{‡}
2016	Spain U17	4	(0)
2017–2018	Spain U19	13	(6)
2018	Spain U20	6	(0)
2017	Basque Country	1	(0)
2019	Spain	1	(0)
2022–	Netherlands	55	(9)
- * Club domestic league appearances and goals as of 22 November 2026 ‡ National team caps and goals as of 13 October 2026

Damaris Berta Egurrola Wienke (born 26 August 1999) is a professional footballer who plays as a midfielder for Première Ligue club OL Lyonnes and the Netherlands national team. At club level, she made her debut with Athletic Club in 2015, moved to Everton in 2020, then signed for Lyon in January 2021.

Born in the United States, she made her senior debut for Spain in 2019; in 2022, she filed a one-time switch to represent the Netherlands instead.

== Club career ==
=== Early life ===
Egurrola spent her early childhood in Orlando, Florida, the second of three children born to a Dutch mother and a Spanish-Basque father (Pablo Egurrola Osa, a professional pelotari competing in American Jai Alai leagues); when he retired in 2006, the family relocated to his homeland in eastern Biscay in Spain's Basque Country.

=== Athletic Bilbao ===
After playing youth football at clubs in the Gernika area, Egurrola – who also showed a talent for tennis – signed for Athletic Club in 2014, aged 14, meeting the club's selective signing criteria due to her local upbringing. Following one season with their B-team, she made her senior team debut in December 2015, making six appearances in the 2015–16 Primera División as Athletic finished as champions, and became a regular from then on.

Along with teammate and friend Maite Oroz, she decided to leave the club when her contract expired in the summer of 2020. In July 2020, a court case regarding the legality of 'compensation lists' for players in Spanish women's football confirmed that a new employer would not have to pay a fee to Athletic Club.

=== Everton ===
After announcing leaving Athletic Bilbao at the end of her contract, Egurrola drew interest from major European clubs, including Everton, which ultimately signed the midfielder on a two-year deal in early September 2020. Egurrola made her debut in the FA WSL on 3 October, in a 6–0 win over Aston Villa and quickly settled as an instrumental player for the team, starting all subsequent games. Teammate Izzy Christiansen was impressed by Egurrola's debut and described her as an "incredible talent".

=== Lyon ===
Only four months after signing for Everton, rumors started to spread about a new potential move for Egurrola. European champions Lyon were reportedly interested in signing the midfielder in the winter transfer window to address their difficulties in the league. Egurrola signed for OL on a three-year and a half deal on 20 January 2021, and made her debut in a Coupe de France game against Stade de Reims. Soon after, she made her debut in both Division 1 Féminine and the UEFA Champions League, both ending in wins and clean sheets.

Egurrola established herself as a starter in the start of the 2021–22 season, proving to be an important member of the team.

== International career ==
Through birth and descent, Egurrola was eligible to play for the United States, Spain, and the Netherlands. She was involved with Spain national team age-groups at several levels and with much success, being a member of the under-17 squad that claimed the silver medal at the 2016 UEFA U-17 Championship and bronze at the 2016 FIFA U-17 World Cup; the under-19 squad which won the 2017 UEFA U-19 Championship, (using her height to score a header in the final victory over France) – she also helped the U19s to qualify for the 2018 edition which they again won, but had moved to the higher age group by the time of the finals tournament – and the under-20 squad who were runners-up at the 2018 FIFA U-20 World Cup.

Egurrola made her Spain senior debut in May 2019, aged 19, appearing as a substitute for the closing minutes of a 4–0 friendly win over Cameroon in the build-up to the 2019 FIFA World Cup, although she was not selected in the eventual finals squad. In October 2019, she was called up to the inaugural squad for España Promesas (essentially Spain B), along with two clubmates. She has also played for the unofficial Basque Country team.

Two years after her appearance for Spain, in November 2021 the Spain national team coach Jorge Vilda stated that he had tried to call up Egurrola twice over the past few months, and to talk to her over the phone on multiple occasions; the player's agents refuted this, responding that these call-ups referred to the Promesas (under-23s) rather than the senior team, and that there had been no attempt to reach out to her personally over the past two years. It was also disclosed that Egurrola had elected to play for another national team, at that time not identified (but one of the two teams in the 2019 FIFA Women's World Cup Final).

After filing a one-time switch, Egurrola committed to the Netherlands national team in March 2022. She made her debut on 8 April 2022. It was later revealed that she had a poor opinion of Jorge Vilda over his treatment of female footballers including herself, and this was a major factor in her decision to represent the Netherlands instead.

On 31 May 2023, she was named as part of the Netherlands provisional squad for the 2023 FIFA World Cup. She played in all five games for the Netherlands.

In the 2023–24 UEFA Nations League on 5 December 2023, the Netherlands were winning 2–0 against Belgium in the 90th minute, but needed to score once more to beat England on goal difference in Group A1 and advance to the finals (and possible qualification for the 2024 Summer Olympics). Egurrola scored in the first minute of injury time. However, England subsequently scored in their concurrent fixture against Scotland, putting them back at the top of the group. In the final seconds of the match against Belgium, Egurrola scored again, securing her team's progression to the finals.

== Career statistics ==
=== International ===
As of match played 13 October 2026

Appearances and goals by national team and year
National team	Year	Apps	Goals
Spain	2019	1	0
Netherlands	2022	11	3
Netherlands	2023	16	2
Netherlands	2024	9	1
Netherlands	2025	11	1
Netherlands	2026	8	2
Netherlands	Total	55	9
Career total		56	9

Scores and results list Netherlands' goal tally first, score column indicates score after each Egurrola goal.

List of international goals scored by Damaris Egurrola
No.	Date	Venue	Opponent	Score	Result	Competition
1	12 April 2022	ADO Den Haag Stadium, The Hague, Netherlands	South Africa	4–1	5–1	Friendly
2	12 April 2022	ADO Den Haag Stadium, The Hague, Netherlands	South Africa	5–1	5–1	Friendly
3	13 July 2022	Leigh Sports Village, Leigh, England	Portugal	1–0	3–2	UEFA Women's Euro 2022
4	5 December 2023	Koning Willem II Stadion, Tilburg, Netherlands	Belgium	3–0	4–0	2023–24 UEFA Women's Nations League
5	5 December 2023	Koning Willem II Stadion, Tilburg, Netherlands	Belgium	4–0	4–0	2023–24 UEFA Women's Nations League
6	25 October 2024	De Vijverberg, Doetinchem, Netherlands	Indonesia	8–0	15–0	Friendly
7	4 April 2025	Erve Asito, Almelo, Netherlands	Austria	2–0	3–1	2025 UEFA Women's Nations League
8	9 October 2026	Pancho Aréna, Felcsút, Hungary	Hungary	5–0	8–0	2027 FIFA Women's World Cup qualification
9	13 October 2026	Koning Willem II Stadion, Tilburg, Netherlands	Hungary	3–0	3–0	2027 FIFA Women's World Cup qualification

== Honours ==
Athletic Bilbao

- Primera División: 2015–16

Lyon

- Première Ligue: 2021–22, 2022–23, 2023–24, 2024–25
- Coupe de France Féminine: 2022–23, 2025–26
- Coupe LFFP: 2025–26
- Trophée des Championnes: 2022, 2023
- UEFA Champions League: 2021–22; runner-up 2023–24

Individual

- LFFP Première Ligue team of the season: 2023–24, 2024–25
- Première Ligue Player of the Month: December 2023
