= Sally Julini =

Swiss footballer (born 2003)

Personal information
- Date of birth: 1 January 2003 (age 23)
- Place of birth: Carouge, Switzerland
- Height: 1.69 m (5 ft 7 in)
- Position: Midfielder

Youth career
- Servette
- 2018–2020: Olympique Lyonnais

Senior career*
Years	Team	Apps	(Gls)
2020–2024	Olympique Lyonnais	6	(1)
2022	→ Guingamp (loan)	10	(1)
2022–2023	→ Guingamp (loan)	10	(0)

International career^{‡}
2020	France U18		
2020	France U20		
2021–	Switzerland	3	(0)
- * Club domestic league appearances and goals as of 14 October 2021 ‡ National team caps and goals as of 14 October 2021

Sally Julini (born 1 January 2003) is a Swiss footballer who plays as a midfielder. She represents the Switzerland national team.

== Early life ==
Julini was born in Geneva to a French father of Ivorian and Guadeloupean descent and a Swiss mother.

== Club career ==
After training at the Swiss national center in Biel since the age of 12, Sally Julini then played with the men's youth teams of Meyrin FC and the U15s of Servette FC, before joining Olympique Lyonnais youth academy in 2019.

She played her first D1 match on the 2 October 2020 against Fleury, soon also making her Champions League debut on the following 15 December, against Juventus.

== International career ==
Called with the youth selections of the France team on several occasions since the summer 2020, she finally opted for the Swiss selection, that she was first selected for in April 2021 for the Euro 2022 qualifaying against the Czech Republic.

She made her international debut for Switzerland on the 17 September 2021, during a World Cup qualifaying against Lithuania.

== Personal life ==
In August 2024, Julini gave birth to her first child Saïmon, which resulted in her career break.
