= Grace Kazadi =

French footballer (born 2001)

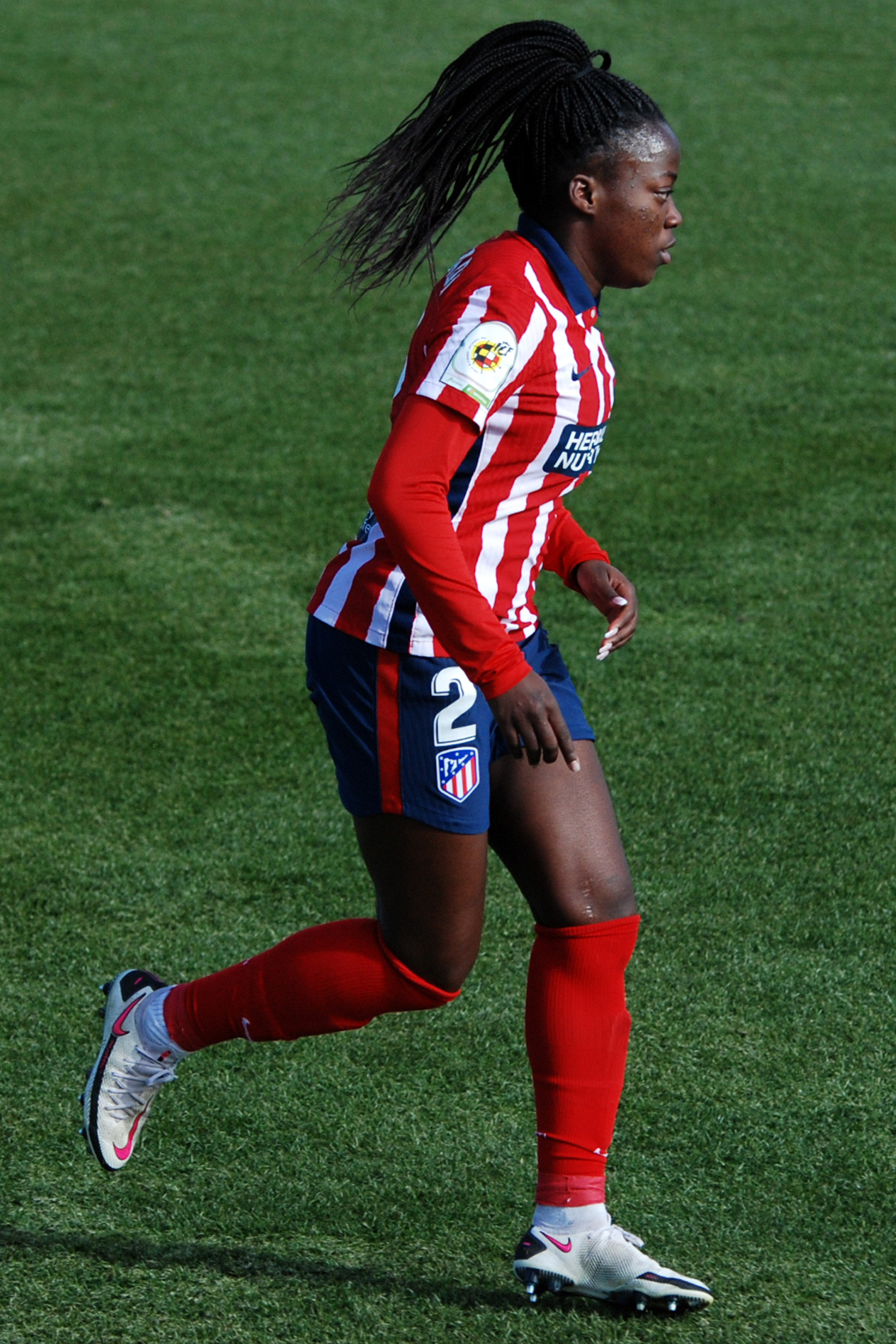
- Kazadi with Atlético Madrid in 2021

Personal information
- Full name: Grace Kazadi Ntambwe
- Date of birth: 31 January 2001 (age 25)
- Place of birth: Montmorency, France
- Height: 1.63 m (5 ft 4 in)
- Position: Defender

Team information
- Current team: Strasbourg
- Number: 3

Youth career
- 2010–2011: CSM Eaubonne
- 2011–2016: Etente SSG
- 2016–2020: Lyon

Senior career*
Years	Team	Apps	(Gls)
2020–2022	Lyon	0	(0)
2020–2021	→ Atlético Madrid (loan)	20	(0)
2022	→ Sevilla (loan)	6	(0)
2022–2025	Guingamp	42	(0)
2025–	Strasbourg	2	(0)

International career
2018	France U17	3	(2)
2018–2020	France U19	13	(0)
2019	France U20	2	(0)
2022–2023	France U23	7	(0)
2021–2022	France	2	(0)
- * Club domestic league appearances and goals as of 03:39, 16 November 2025 (UTC)

Grace Kazadi Ntambwe (born 31 January 2001) is a French professional footballer who plays as a defender for Première Ligue club Strasbourg.

== Club career ==
On 12 November 2021, Kazadi extended hercontract with Olympique Lyonnais until 30 June 2023. Lyon will receive a 40% interest in a future transfer.

On 1 August 2020, Kazadi joined Atlético Madrid on loan. She made her league debut against Espanyol on 3 October 2020. Whilst at the club, Kazadi helped them win the Supercopa de España on 16 January 2021.

In January 2022, Kazadi was sent on loan to Sevilla for the remainder of the season. She made her league debut against Villarreal on 2 February 2022.

On 5 August 2022, Kazadi was announced at Guingamp on a two year contract. She made her league debut against Fleury on 10 September 2022. On 30 January 2024, it was announced that Kazado had suffered a season ending knee injury. On 1 July 2024, she extended her contract with the club until 2025.

Following the expiry of her contract, Kazadi joined fellow Première Ligue team Strasbourg on a two-year deal. She became only the second-ever player with France national team appearances to play for Strasbourg.

== International career ==
On 13 April 2021, Kazadi made her senior international debut for France, in a 2–0 defeat against the United States.

On 29 August 2022, Kazadi was later called up to the France squad for matches against Estonia and Greece in September 2022.

== Career statistics ==
=== International ===
As of match played 2 September 2022

Appearances and goals by national team and year
National team	Year	Apps	Goals
France	2021	1	0
France	2022	1	0
Total		2	0

== Honours ==
- Supercopa de España: 2020–21
