= Dijon FCO (women) =

French women's football club, based in Dijon

- Full name: Dijon Football Côte d'Or
- Founded: 2006
- Ground: Stade des Poussots, Dijon
- Capacity: 1,500
- Manager: Sébastien Joseph
- League: Première Ligue
- 2025–26: Première Ligue, 6th of 12
- Website: https://www.dfco.fr/dfco-feminin
Home colours	Away colours	Third colours

Dijon Football Côte d'Or (French pronunciation: [diʒɔ̃ futbol kot dɔʁ]; commonly referred to as Dijon FCO or simply Dijon) is a French women's football club based in the city of Dijon.

== History ==
The club has been the women's section of Dijon FCO since 2006. The club currently plays in the Première Ligue, the highest division of women's football in France. After finishing sixth in the 2025–26 Première Ligue, the club was excluded from national competitions by the DNCG due to insufficient financial guarantees for the 2026–27 season.

== Players ==
=== Current squad ===
As of 8 June 2026

Note: Flags indicate national team as defined under FIFA eligibility rules; some limited exceptions apply. Players may hold more than one non-FIFA nationality.

No.	Pos.	Nation	Player
1	GK	FIN	Katriina Talaslahti
2	DF	FRA	Maëlle Richelandet
3	DF	FIN	Emmi Siren
4	DF	FRA	Marion Haelewyn
5	MF	POL	Gabriela Grzybowska
6	MF	FRA	Lina Gay
7	DF	CMR	Colette Ndzana
8	MF	FRA	Léa Declercq
11	FW	SUI	Meriame Terchoun

No.	Pos.	Nation	Player
12	FW	CHN	Wang Yanwen
15	FW	CHN	Wu Chengshu
16	MF	POL	Oliwia Domin
20	MF	FRA	Aïrine Fontaine
24	DF	FRA	Margaux Vairon
27	DF	FRA	Juliane Denizot
28	DF	FRA	Noémie Carage
30	GK	FRA	Charlotte Verdier
33	FW	FRA	Clelia Ducreux
