= Selma Bacha =

French footballer (born 2000)

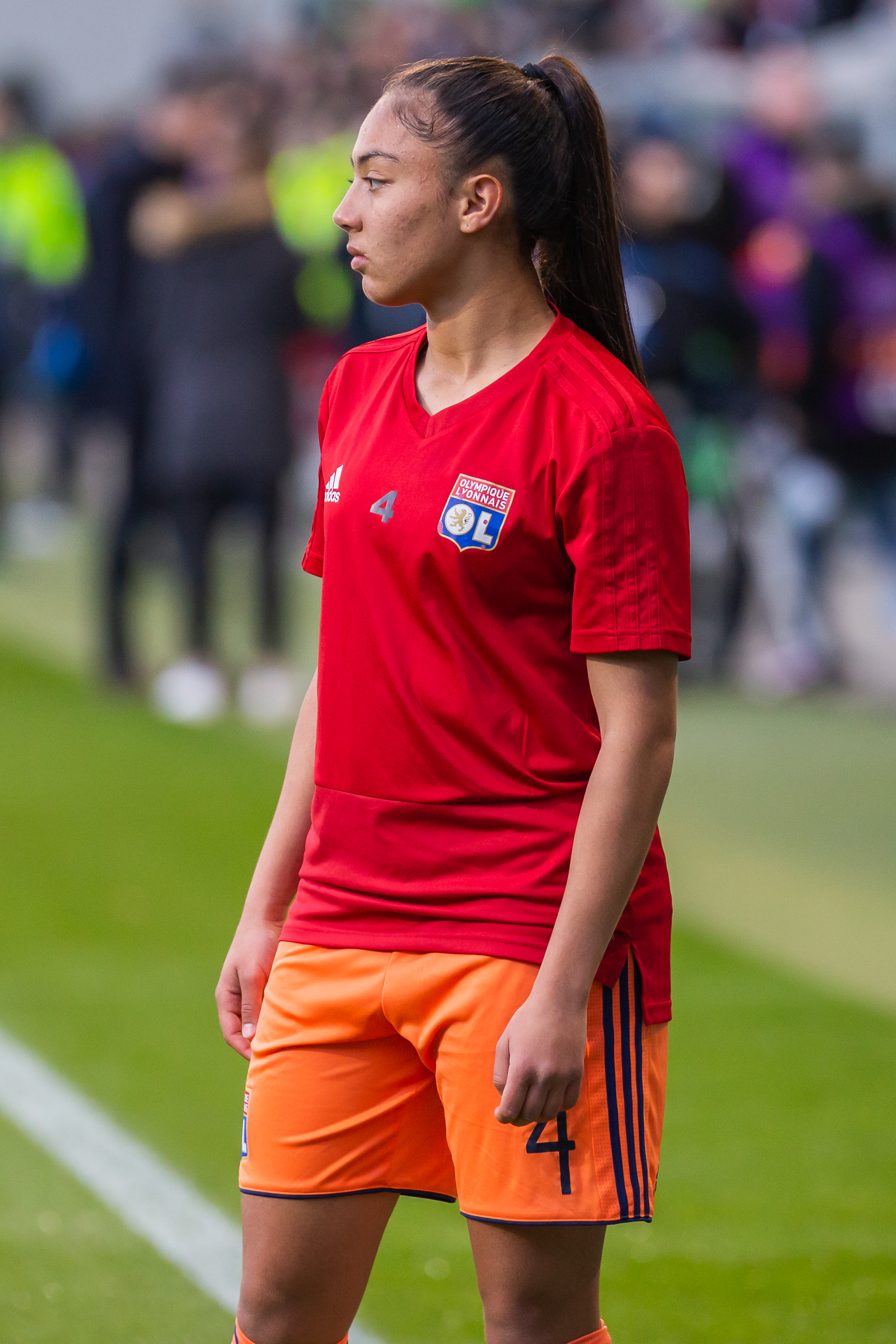
- Bacha with Lyon in 2019

Personal information
- Full name: Selma Lena Bacha
- Date of birth: 9 November 2000 (age 26)
- Place of birth: Lyon, France
- Height: 1.61 m (5 ft 3 in)
- Positions: Left-back; left winger

Team information
- Current team: Lyon
- Number: 4

Youth career
- 2008–2009: FC Gerland
- 2009–2017: Lyon

Senior career*
Years	Team	Apps	(Gls)
2017–	Lyon	122	(5)

International career^{‡}
2016	France U16	9	(2)
2016–2017	France U17	13	(4)
2018–2019	France U19	13	(0)
2017–2020	France U20	15	(0)
2021	France U23	2	(0)
2021–	France	55	(3)
Medal record
Women's football
Representing France
UEFA Women's Nations League
Runner-up	2024
Third place	2025
UEFA Women's Under-19 Championship
Winner	2019 Scotland
- * Club domestic league appearances and goals as of 22 November 2026 ‡ National team caps and goals as of 10 October 2026

Selma Lena Bacha (born 9 November 2000) is a French professional footballer who plays as a left-back or left winger for Première Ligue club Lyon and the France national team.

== Early life ==
Bacha grew up in the Grange Blanche district of Lyon, France to a father of Algerian descent and Tunisian mother. She was introduced to football by her brother at the age of four. She joined the Lyon academy at the age of eight.

== Club career ==
Bacha continued to progress through the youth ranks at Lyon. In 2013, her performances caught the attention of Sonia Bompastor, a former footballer who was also responsible for Lyon's training centre. She signed a professional contract with Lyon during the 2017–18 season. That same season, Lyon went on to win the Champions League, with Bacha starting in the final. She was nominated for the prize for best young player of the year at the 2018 UNFP Football Trophies. Lyon were to contest the 2019 Champions League final too; Bacha featured in the game as a substitute for Eugénie Le Sommer, coming on in the 82nd minute of the match.

In 2020, she won the Champions League, Coupe de France, and French Championship treble with Lyon.

In December 2024, Bacha extended her contract with Lyon until 2029.

== International career ==
On 30 May 2022, Bacha was called up to the France squad for the UEFA Euro 2022.

She was called up to the France squad for the 2023 FIFA World Cup.

In July 2024, Bacha was named in France's squad for the 2024 Olympics.

== Career statistics ==
=== Club ===
As of match played 22 November 2026

Appearances and goals by club, season and competition
Club	Season	League			National cup		League cup		Continental		Other		Total	
Club	Season	Division	Apps	Goals	Apps	Goals	Apps	Goals	Apps	Goals	Apps	Goals	Apps	Goals
Lyon	2017–18	Première Ligue	11	0	6	2	—		6 (Note: Appearances in UEFA Women's Champions League)	0	—		23	2
Lyon	2018–19	Première Ligue	15	0	2	0	—		7	1	—		24	1
Lyon	2019–20	Première Ligue	6	0	4	0	—		5	0	0	0	15	0
Lyon	2020–21	Première Ligue	10	0	1	0	—		5	0	—		16	0
Lyon	2021–22	Première Ligue	19	3	2	0	—		11	0	—		32	3
Lyon	2022–23	Première Ligue	14	2	3	0	—		8	0	1 (Note: Appearance in Trophée des Championnes)	0	26	2
Lyon	2023–24	Première Ligue	16	0	4	0	—		10	1	3 (Note: Two appearances in playoffs and one appearance in Trophée des Championnes)	0	33	1
Lyon	2024–25	Première Ligue	10	0	0	0	—		6	0	2 (Note: Appearances in playoffs)	0	18	0
Lyon	2025–26	Première Ligue	11	0	4	0	2	1	9	0	2	0	28	1
Lyon	2026–27	Première Ligue	10	0	0	0	0	0	5	0	—		15	0
Career total			122	5	26	2	2	1	72	2	8	0	230	10

=== International ===
As of match played 10 October 2026

Appearances and goals by national team and year
National team	Year	Apps	Goals
France	2021	2	1
France	2022	11	0
France	2023	13	1
France	2024	12	0
France	2025	14	1
France	2026	3	0
Total		55	3

Scores and results list France's goal tally first, score column indicates score after each Bacha goal.

List of international goals scored by Selma Bacha
No.	Date	Venue	Opponent	Score	Result	Competition
1	30 November 2021	Stade de Roudourou, Guingamp, France	Wales	2–0	2–0	2023 FIFA Women's World Cup qualification
2	22 September 2023	Stade du Hainaut, Valenciennes, France	Portugal	2–0	2–0	2023–24 UEFA Women's Nations League
3	4 April 2025	Kybunpark, St. Gallen, Switzerland	Switzerland	2–0	2–0	2025 UEFA Women's Nations League

== Honours ==
Lyon

- Première Ligue: 2017–18, 2018–19, 2019–20, 2021–22, 2022–23, 2023–24, 2024–25, 2025–26
- Coupe de France Féminine: 2018–19, 2019–20, 2022–23, 2025–26
- Coupe LFFP: 2025–26
- Trophée des Championnes: 2019, 2022, 2023
- UEFA Women's Champions League: 2017–18, 2018–19, 2019–20, 2021–22

France U19

- UEFA Women's Under-19 Championship: 2019

France

- UEFA Women's Nations League runners-up: 2023–24

Individual

- UEFA Women's Under-17 Championship team of the tournament: 2017
- IFFHS Women's World Team: 2022
- UEFA Women's Champions League team of the season: 2023–24, 2025–26
- UNFP Première Ligue team of the year: 2024–25
- LFFP Première Ligue team of the season: 2021–22, 2025–26
- Première Ligue Player of the Month: October 2021, November 2021
