= 2016–17 Olympique Lyonnais Féminin season =

Olympique Lyonnais Féminin
2016–17 season
- Manager: Gérard Prêcheur
- Stadium: Groupama OL Training Center
- Division 1: Champions
- Coupe de France: Champions
- UEFA Champions League: Champions
- Top goalscorer: League: Two players (20); All: Eugénie Le Sommer (29)
Home colours	Away colours	Third colours

The 2016–17 Olympique Lyonnais Féminin season was the club's thirteenth season since FC Lyon joined OL as its women's section. Like the previous season, the team won all three competitions: the Division 1 Féminine, the Coupe de France Féminine and notably its fourth UEFA Women's Champions League after it defeated Paris Saint-Germain in the final.

== Season events ==
Lyon had won in the 2015–16 season its second triple crown, including its fourth UEFA Women's Champions League along with its fifth national double in a row. Before the end of the season Amandine Henry had moved to the NWSL, while subsequently Louisa Necib retired and Lotta Schelin returned to the Damallsvenskan. Lyon reacted by signing Dzsenifer Marozsán from Frankfurt. Kenza Dali, Kheira Hamraoui, Jessica Houara and Caroline Seger joined from major rival Paris Saint-Germain. Lyon also recruited New Zealand goalkeeper, Erin Nayler, from Sky Blue on a two-year contract to act as back-up for first-choice goalkeeper, Sarah Bouhaddi.

From September to November, Lyon won all first eight league games and first two Champions League rounds against newcomer Avaldsnes and Zürich by wide scorelines. Following a 2–1 win over 3rd place Montpellier, Lyon ended the year a 1–0 loss in its first game against Paris Saint-Germain, which took the lead in the table. However, on January 6 PSG's September 0–4 win over Albi was reversed to a 3–0 loss, thus losing their advantage over Lyon. PSG's subsequent 2–1 loss against Montpellier gave Lyon the lead again.

In the winter transfer window, Lyon made three signings. Alex Morgan was recruited on loan from NWSL's Orlando Pride, Kadeisha Buchanan arrived straight from college soccer, and Josephine Henning subsequently joined the team. Lyon won all its first games in 2017, expanding its lead to a 6-point margin, before facing Wolfsburg in the Champions League's quarterfinals. 2012–13 and 2013–14 champion Wolfsburg had been Lyon's rival in the past edition's final, which Lyon had won on penalties, and the tie was branded by the media as the competition's advanced final. Lyon nearly ensured qualification with a 0–2 away win, and made it to the semifinals against Manchester City despite a 0–1 home defeat. After qualifying for the national cup's final, Lyon again set course to the final in an away first leg with a 1–3 win before suffering a one-goal defeat in Lyon to a goal by Carli Lloyd, enough to make it to the final in Cardiff, where they faced PSG in the second final between two teams from the same country.

On May 8, Lyon sealed its 11th national championship in a row with two games remaining, in a 9–0 win over Soyaux. Finally the team faced a triple showdown against Paris Saint-Germain with two titles in dispute as well as PSG's qualification for the next Champions League as Montpellier took the second place. After a 3–0 win in the league match, the cup final ended in a 1–1 draw followed by a 7–6 victory in the penalty shootout, giving Lyon its sixth consecutive national double. The Champions League final also ended in a draw with no goals were scored either in the extra time. The penalty shootout was also a long one, and it was resolved in a duel between the two goalkeepers. PSG's Katarzyna Kiedrzynek missed her kick and couldn't stop Bouhaddi's shot, which made the team the European champion for the fourth time and second time in a row.

== Squad ==
As of match played 1 June 2017

No.	Name	Nationality	Position	Date of birth (age)	Signed from	Signed in	Contract ends	Apps.	Goals
Goalkeepers
16	Sarah Bouhaddi	(France)	GK	17 October 1986 (aged 30)	Juvisy	2009		200	1
30	Méline Gérard	(France)	GK	30 May 1990 (aged 27)	Saint-Étienne	2014			
Defenders
3	Wendie Renard	(France)	DF	20 July 1990 (aged 26)	Academy	2006		284	76
4	Julie Marichaud	(France)	DF	12 November 1997 (aged 19)	Academy	2012			
8	Jessica Houara	(France)	DF	29 September 1987 (aged 29)	Paris Saint-Germain	2016		28	2
17	Corine Petit	(France)	DF	5 October 1983 (aged 33)	Soyaux	2008			
21	Kadeisha Buchanan	(Canada)	DF	5 November 1995 (aged 21)	West Virginia Mountaineers	2017		17	0
26	Josephine Henning	(Germany)	DF	8 September 1989 (aged 27)	Arsenal	2017		8	0
29	Griedge Mbock Bathy	(France)	DF	26 February 1995 (aged 22)	Guingamp	2015			
Midfielders
2	Kenza Dali	(France)	MF	31 July 1991 (aged 25)	Paris Saint-Germain	2016		7	1
5	Saki Kumagai	(Japan)	MF	17 October 1990 (aged 26)	1. FFC Frankfurt	2013		124	27
7	Amel Majri	(France)	MF	25 January 1993 (aged 24)	Academy	2010			
10	Dzsenifer Marozsán	(Germany)	MF	18 April 1992 (aged 25)	1. FFC Frankfurt	2016		32	7
11	Kheira Hamraoui	(France)	MF	13 January 1990 (aged 27)	Paris Saint-Germain	2016		14	3
15	Aurélie Kaci	(France)	MF	19 December 1989 (aged 27)	Paris Saint-Germain	2015			
18	Claire Lavogez	(France)	MF	18 June 1994 (aged 22)	Montpellier	2015			
23	Camille Abily	(France)	MF	5 December 1984 (aged 32)	FC Gold Pride	2010			
27	Caroline Seger	(Sweden)	MF	19 March 1985 (aged 32)	Paris Saint-Germain	2016		26	1
Forwards
6	Andrea Norheim	(Norway)	FW	30 January 1999 (aged 18)	Klepp	2016		1	1
9	Eugénie Le Sommer	(France)	FW	18 May 1989 (aged 28)	Stade Briochin	2010		225	203
12	Élodie Thomis	(France)	FW	13 August 1986 (aged 30)	Montpellier	2007		265	107
13	Alex Morgan	(United States)	FW	2 July 1989 (aged 27)	Orlando Pride	2017	2017	16	12
14	Ada Hegerberg	(Norway)	FW	10 July 1995 (aged 21)	Turbine Potsdam	2014		100	115
20	Delphine Cascarino	(France)	FW	5 February 1997 (aged 20)	Academy	2015		30	11
22	Pauline Bremer	(Germany)	FW	10 April 1996 (aged 21)	Turbine Potsdam	2017		28	9
24	Mylaine Tarrieu	(France)	FW	3 January 1995 (aged 22)	Academy	2013			
Out on loan
1	Erin Nayler	(New Zealand)	GK	17 April 1992 (aged 25)	Sky Blue FC	2016	2018	0	0
25	Julie Piga	(France)	DF	12 January 1998 (aged 19)	Academy	2013			
Left during the season

=== Out on loan ===
Note: Flags indicate national team as defined under FIFA eligibility rules; some limited exceptions apply. Players may hold more than one non-FIFA nationality.

No. / Pos. / Nation / Player; 1 / GK / NZL / Erin Nayler (at Grenoble)	No. / Pos. / Nation / Player; 25 / DF / FRA / Julie Piga (at Grenoble)

== Transfers ==
=== In ===
Date	Position	Nationality	Name	From	Fee	Ref.
1 July 2016	MF	(Germany)	Dzsenifer Marozsán	1. FFC Frankfurt	Undisclosed	
1 July 2016	DF	(France)	Kenza Dali	Paris Saint-Germain	Undisclosed	
1 July 2016	MF	(France)	Kheira Hamraoui	Paris Saint-Germain	Undisclosed	
1 July 2016	MF	(France)	Jessica Houara	Paris Saint-Germain	Undisclosed	
1 July 2016	MF	(Sweden)	Caroline Seger	Paris Saint-Germain	Undisclosed	
1 July 2016	FW	(Norway)	Andrea Norheim	Klepp	Undisclosed	
1 September 2016	GK	(New Zealand)	Erin Nayler	Sky Blue FC	Undisclosed	
3 January 2017	DF	(Germany)	Josephine Henning	Arsenal	Undisclosed	
8 January 2017	DF	(Canada)	Kadeisha Buchanan	West Virginia Mountaineers	Undisclosed	

=== Loans in ===
Start date	Position	Nationality	Name	From	End date	Ref.
20 December 2016	FW	(United States)	Alex Morgan	Orlando Pride	30 June 2017	

=== Out ===
Date	Position	Nationality	Name	To	Fee	Ref.
8 June 2016	FW	(Sweden)	Lotta Schelin	Rosengård	Undisclosed	
27 June 2016	DF	(France)	Estelle Cascarino	Juvisy	Undisclosed	
7 July 2016	GK	(France)	Cindy Perrault	Albi	Undisclosed	
8 July 2016	DF	(Denmark)	Line Røddik Hansen	Barcelona	Undisclosed	

=== Loans out ===
Start date	Position	Nationality	Name	To	End date	Ref.
5 January 2017	GK	(New Zealand)	Erin Nayler	Grenoble	End of season	
31 January 2017	DF	(France)	Julie Piga	Grenoble	End of season	

=== Released ===
Date	Position	Nationality	Name	Joined	Date	Ref.
30 June 2017	GK	(France)	Méline Gérard	Montpellier		
30 June 2017	GK	(France)	Lois Ursella			
30 June 2017	DF	(France)	Julie Marichaud			
30 June 2017	DF	(Germany)	Josephine Henning	Arsenal		
30 June 2017	MF	(France)	Aurélie Kaci	Atlético Madrid		
30 June 2017	MF	(Sweden)	Caroline Seger	Rosengård		
30 June 2017	FW	(France)	Marine Cochelin	Saint-Étienne		

== Friendlies ==
8 August 2016	Nîmes	Cancelled	Olympique Lyonnais	Nîmes
		Report

13 August 2016	Olympique Lyonnais	4–0	Grenoble	Lyon
	Hegerberg	Report

17 August 2016	Olympique Lyonnais	7–3	Saint-Étienne	Chasse-sur-Rhône
	Hegerberg 7', 18', 82'; Bremer 24'; Kumagai 27', 62'; Cascarino 38'	Report	Lavaud 40'; Traoré 72'; Gago 77'

27 August 2016	Olympique Lyonnais (France)	1–0	(Germany) Freiburg	Holtzwihr
16:00	Dali 30'	Report		Attendance: 2,000

4 September 2016	Olympique Lyonnais (France)	4–0	(Italy) Brescia	Montreux
16:00	Kumagai 40'; Lavogez 48'; Hegerberg 52'; Le Sommer 67'	Report		Attendance: 400

== Competitions ==
=== Overview ===
Competition	First match	Last match	Starting round	Final position	Record							
Competition	First match	Last match	Starting round	Final position	Pld	W	D	L	GF	GA	GD	Win %
Division 1	11 September 2016	25 May 2017	Matchday 1	Winners	22	21	0	1	103	6	+97	95.45
Coupe de France	8 January 2017	19 May 2017	Round of 64	Winners	6	5	1	0	35	1	+34	83.33
UEFA Champions League	5 October 2016	1 June 2017	Round of 32	Winners	9	6	1	2	32	5	+27	66.67
Total					37	32	2	3	170	12	+158	86.49

Last updated: 1 June 2017
Source: Competitions

=== Division 1 ===
==== Results summary ====
Overall								Home						Away					
Pld	W	D	L	GF	GA	GD	Pts	W	D	L	GF	GA	GD	W	D	L	GF	GA	GD
22	21	0	1	103	6	+97	63	11	0	0	63	4	+59	10	0	1	40	2	+38

Last updated: 25 May 2017.

==== Results by matchday ====
Matchday	1	2	3	4	5	6	7	8	9	10	11	12	13	14	15	16	17	18	19	20	21	22
Ground	A	H	A	H	A	H	A	H	H	A (Note: matchday 11)	A (Note: matchday 12)	H (Note: matchday 13)	H (Note: matchday 14)	A (Note: matchday 9)	A	A	H	H	A	H	H	A
Result	W	W	W	W	W	W	W	W	W	L	W	W	W	W	W	W	W	W	W	W	W	W
Position	1	1	1	1	1	1	1	1	1	1	1	1	1	1	1	1	1	1	1	1	1	1

Updated to match(es) played on 25 May 2017. Source: Results
A = Away; H = Home; W = Win; D = Draw; L = Loss; P = Postponed

==== Results ====
11 September 2016 1	Soyaux	0–9	Olympique Lyonnais	Angoulême
15:00 CEST (UTC+2)	Viana (yellow card) 32'	Report	Le Sommer 5', 23', 35', 69', 78'; Hegerberg 38', 79'; Tarrieu 45'; Lavogez 81'	Stadium: Stade Camille Lebon; Attendance: 1,169; Referee: Anaelle Loidon

25 September 2016 2	Olympique Lyonnais	6–0	Albi	Décines-Charpieu
15:00 CEST (UTC+2)	Marozsán 12', 70'; Majri 27'; Lavogez 45'; Hegerberg 68', 75'	Report		Stadium: Groupama OL Training Center; Attendance: 965; Referee: Solen Dallongeville

2 October 2016 3	AS Saint-Étienne	0–4	Olympique Lyonnais	Feurs
15:00 CEST (UTC+2)	Moreau (yellow card) 41'; Digonnet (yellow card) 62'; Carage (yellow card) 66'; Clemaron (yellow card) 89'	Report	Abily 44'; Hamraoui (yellow card) 53'; Hegerberg 72'; Majri 81'; Lavogez (yellow card) 87'; Kumagai 90+1' (pen.)	Stadium: Stade Maurice Rousson; Attendance: 566; Referee: Florence Guillemin

9 October 2016 4	Olympique Lyonnais	8–0	Girondins Bordeaux	Décines-Charpieu
15:00 CEST (UTC+2)	Majri 15'; Lavogez 23', 65'; Hegerberg 29'; Mustaki 47' (o.g.); Petit 54', 60'; Bremer 65'	Report	Hamidouche (yellow card) 26'; Salomon (yellow card) 52'; Montegut (yellow card) 67'	Stadium: Groupama OL Training Center; Attendance: 971; Referee: Jennifer Maubacq

15 October 2016 5	Olympique Marseille	1–6	Olympique Lyonnais	Fos-sur-Mer
18:45 CEST (UTC+2)	Multari (yellow card) 68'; Asseyi 75'	Report	Abily 27'; Le Sommer 32', 49'; Hegerberg 44'; Majri 63'; Laplacette 65' (o.g.)	Stadium: Stade Parsemain; Attendance: 1,685; Referee: Elodie Coppola

30 October 2016 6	Olympique Lyonnais	9–1	Guingamp	Décines-Charpieu
15:00 CET (UTC+1)	Abily 8', 47'; Majri 11'; Bremer 28'; Kumagai 31'; Lavogez 45+1'; Le Sommer 63', 82', 84'	Report	Oparanozie 67'	Stadium: Groupama OL Training Center; Attendance: 1,300; Referee: Vanessa Cruchon

5 November 2016 7	Rodez	0–5	Olympique Lyonnais	Rodez
16:00 CET (UTC+1)		Report	Marozsán 31', 45'; Hegerberg 56'; Abily 57'; Renard 90' (pen.)	Stadium: Stade Paul-Lignon; Attendance: 758; Referee: Vanessa Cruchon

20 November 2016 8	Olympique Lyonnais	3–0	Metz	Décines-Charpieu
14:30 CET (UTC+1)	Abily 36'; Hegerberg 54'; Renard 86'	Report	Dechilly (yellow card) 68'	Stadium: Groupama OL Training Center; Attendance: 681; Referee: Solen Dallongeville

10 December 2016 10	Olympique Lyonnais	2–1	Montpellier	Décines-Charpieu
15:00 CET (UTC+1)	Abily 5'; Le Sommer 7'	Report	Dekker 42'	Stadium: Groupama OL Training Center; Attendance: 1,269; Referee: Sabine Bonnin

12 December 2016 11	Paris Saint-Germain	1–0	Olympique Lyonnais	Saint-Germain-en-Laye
18:45 CET (UTC+1)	Delie 83'	Report		Stadium: Georges Lefèvre; Attendance: 1,858; Referee: Jennifer Maubacq

14 January 2017 12	Guingamp	0–3	Olympique Lyonnais	Saint-Brieuc
14:30 CET (UTC+1)		Report	Le Sommer 21', 26'; Hegerberg 72'	Stadium: Stade Fred Aubert; Attendance: 3,076; Referee: Sabine Bonnin

5 February 2017 13	Olympique Lyonnais	4–0	Olympique Marseille	Décines-Charpieu
15:00 CET (UTC+1)	Kumagai 28' (pen.); Abily 37'; Le Sommer 54'; Hegerberg 84'	Report		Stadium: Groupama OL Training Center; Attendance: 1,404; Referee: Florence Guillemin

12 February 2017 14	Olympique Lyonnais	5–2	Juvisy	Décines-Charpieu
16:30 CET (UTC+1)	Majri 5'; Hegerberg 23', 29'; Kumagai 53' (pen.); Le Sommer 66'	Report	Mateo 31'; Cascarino (yellow card) 52'; Jauréna 80'	Stadium: Groupama OL Training Center; Attendance: 4,913; Referee: Solen Dallongeville

15 February 2017 9	Juvisy	0–1	Olympique Lyonnais	Bondoufle
15:00 CET (UTC+1)		Report	Abily 22'	Stadium: Stade Robert Bobin; Attendance: 1,200; Referee: Sabine Bonnin

25 February 2017 15	Montpellier	0–3	Olympique Lyonnais	Montpellier
14:30 CET (UTC+1)		Report	Renard 13', 67'; Bremer 26'; Buchanan (yellow card) 73'	Stadium: Stade Bernard Gasset; Attendance: 684; Referee: Élodie Coppola

18 March 2017 16	Albi	0–5	Olympique Lyonnais	Albi
18:30 CET (UTC+1)	Martinez (yellow card) 90'	Report	Kumagai 4' (pen.); Hegerberg 30'; Renard (yellow card) 32'; Abily 39'; Morgan 67', 68'	Stadium: Stade Maurice Rigaud; Attendance: 959; Referee: Vanessa Cruchon

26 March 2017 17	Olympique Lyonnais	8–0	Rodez	Décines-Charpieu
16:00 CET (UTC+1)	Seger (yellow card) 25'; Hegerberg 38', 44'; Lavogez 42'; Tarrieu 45+1', 48'; Mbock 62'; Petit 76'; Bremer 80'	Report		Stadium: Groupama OL Training Center; Attendance: 1,033; Referee: Céline Bagrowski

2 April 2017 18	Olympique Lyonnais	6–0	AS Saint-Étienne	Décines-Charpieu
15:00 CEST (UTC+2)	Houara 9', 13'; Mbock 23'; Le Sommer 48', 72'; Lavogez 70'	Report	Carré (red card) 20'; Courteille (yellow card) 75'	Stadium: Groupama OL Training Center; Attendance: 1,300; Referee: Cindy Buffart

3 May 2017 19	Girondins Bordeaux	0–1	Olympique Lyonnais	Libourne
15:00 CEST (UTC+2)		Report	Lavogez 79'	Stadium: Stade Jean-Antoine Moueix; Attendance: 2,405; Referee: Cindy Buffart

8 May 2017 20	Olympique Lyonnais	9–0	Soyaux	Décines-Charpieu
16:00 CEST (UTC+2)	Viana 21' (o.g.); Hegerberg 24', 32'; Morgan 37', 51'; Kumagai 43' (pen.); Le Sommer 47', 59'; Renard 68'	Report	Alleron (yellow card) 3'	Stadium: Groupama OL Training Center; Attendance: 1,204; Referee: Aurélie Labadot-Cadinot

13 May 2017 21	Olympique Lyonnais	3–0	Paris Saint-Germain	Décines-Charpieu
16:00 CEST (UTC+2)	Le Sommer 13'; Hegerberg 27'; Morgan 28'	Report	Delannoy (yellow card) 17'; Cruz (yellow card) 59'; Geyoro (yellow card) 87'	Stadium: Groupama OL Training Center; Attendance: 7,912; Referee: Florence Guillemin

25 May 2017 22	Metz	0–3	Olympique Lyonnais	Amnéville
17:00 CEST (UTC+2)	Pekel (yellow card) 54'	Report	Hegerberg 34'; Mbock 52'; Renard 57'	Stadium: Stade Municipal de Amnéville; Attendance: 1,400; Referee: Victoria Beyer

==== Table ====
Pos	Team	Pld	W	D	L	GF	GA	GD	Pts	Qualification or relegation
1	Lyon (C)	22	21	0	1	103	6	+97	63	Qualification for the Champions League Round of 32
2	Montpellier	22	18	1	3	73	10	+63	55	Qualification for the Champions League Round of 32
3	Paris Saint-Germain	22	16	2	4	54	16	+38	49 (Note: Paris Saint-Germain were deducted 1 point.)	
4	Marseille	22	11	2	9	32	38	−6	35	
5	Juvisy	22	9	5	8	42	25	+17	32	
6	Guingamp	22	8	5	9	28	36	−8	29	
7	Soyaux	22	7	6	9	25	52	−27	27	
8	Rodez	22	5	6	11	22	56	−34	21	
9	Albi	22	6	1	15	14	49	−35	19	
10	Bordeaux	22	3	7	12	14	43	−29	16	
11	Saint-Étienne (R)	22	3	6	13	18	48	−30	15	Relegation to Division 2 Féminine
12	Metz (R)	22	3	3	16	13	59	−46	12	Relegation to Division 2 Féminine

Source: Soccerway FFF
Rules for classification: 1) points; 2) goal difference; 3) goals scored
(C) Champions; (R) Relegated

=== Coupe de France ===
8 January 2017 Round of 64	Ambilly	0–8	Olympique Lyonnais	Gaillard
18:45 CET (UTC+1)			Cascarino 7', 74'; Petit 11'; Bremer 19'; Lavogez 49', 60'; Hamraoui 72'; Norheim 76'	Stadium: Salvatore Mazzéo; Referee: Solenne Bartnik

27 January 2017 Round of 32	Olympique Lyonnais	5–0	Grenoble	Décines-Charpieu
20:00 CET (UTC+1)	Le Sommer 20'; Hamraoui 22'; Lavogez 42', 56'; Kaci 86'			Stadium: Groupama OL Training Center; Referee: Magali Bourquin

19 February 2017 Round of 16	Guingamp	0–5	Olympique Lyonnais	Saint-Brieuc
16:40 CET (UTC+1)			Bremer 67', 84', 87'; Lavogez 89'; Kumagai 90+3' (pen.)	Stadium: Stade Fred Aubert; Attendance: 800; Referee: Sabine Bonnin

12 March 2017 Quarterfinal	Olympique Lyonnais	6–0	Rodez	Décines-Charpieu
14:00 CET (UTC+1)	Bremer 31'; Morgan 37', 65', 79'; Hamraoui 73'; Dali 87'		Cance (yellow card) 88'	Stadium: Groupama OL Training Center; Attendance: 600; Referee: Cindy Buffart

16 April 2017 Semifinal	Hénin-Beaumont	0–10	Olympique Lyonnais	Hénin-Beaumont
15:00 CEST (UTC+2)			Le Sommer 9', 18'; Morgan 20', 55', 61', 64'; Majri 27'; Hegerberg 50', 80', 85'	Stadium: Stade Octave Birembaut; Attendance: 1,000; Referee: Jennifer Maubacq

19 May 2017 Final	Olympique Lyonnais	1–1 (a.e.t.) (7–6 p)	Paris Saint-Germain	Vannes
21:00 CEST (UTC+2)	Kumagai 34' (pen.); Mbock (yellow card) 74'		Cristiane 7'; Périsset (yellow card) 86'; Kiedrzynek (yellow card) 91'	Stadium: Stade de La Rabine; Attendance: 7,000; Referee: Solen Dalongeville
	Penalties
	Majri (penalty scored); Le Sommer (penalty scored); Renard (penalty scored); Mbock (penalty scored); Kumagai (penalty missed); Marozsán (penalty scored); Abily (penalty scored); Hegerberg (penalty scored)		(penalty scored) Delannoy; (penalty scored) Delie; (penalty scored) Périsset; (penalty scored) Formiga; (penalty missed) Paredes; (penalty scored) Boquete; (penalty scored) Diallo; (penalty missed) Sarr

=== UEFA Champions League ===
5 October 2016 Round of 32 1st leg	Avaldsnes (Norway)	2–5	(France) Olympique Lyonnais	Haugesund, Norway
18:00 CEST (UTC+2)	Thorsnes 23'; Hansen 52'	Report	Kumagai 7' (pen.); Le Sommer 20'; Abily 48', 62'; Hegerberg 86'	Stadium: Haugesund Stadion; Attendance: 4,619; Referee: Teodora Albon (Romania)

12 October 2016 Round of 32 2nd leg	Olympique Lyonnais (France)	5–0 (10–2 agg.)	(Norway) Avaldsnes	Décines-Charpieu, France
20:45 CEST (UTC+2)		Report	Renard 3'; Marozsán 41'; Cascarino 59'; Le Sommer 64', 74'	Stadium: Parc Olympique Lyonnais; Attendance: 5,089; Referee: Zuzana Kováčová (Slovakia)

9 November 2016 Round of 16 1st leg	Olympique Lyonnais (France)	8–0	(Switzerland) Zürich	Décines-Charpieu, France
18:15 CET (UTC+1)	Le Sommer 22', 35'; Mbock 26'; Hegerberg 29', 30', 41'; Tarrieu 90'; Lavogez 90+3'	Report		Stadium: Parc Olympique Lyonnais; Attendance: 3,841; Referee: Esther Azzopardi (Malta)

16 November 2016 Round of 16 2nd leg	Zürich (Switzerland)	0–9 (0–17 agg.)	(France) Olympique Lyonnais	Zürich, Switzerland
19:00 CET (UTC+1)		Report	Abily 18', 39'; Seger 20'; Kumagai 42'; Lavogez 62', 63'; Tarrieu 64'; Renard 80'; Petit 88'	Stadium: Stadion Letzigrund; Attendance: 4,022; Referee: Marte Sørø (Norway)

23 March 2017 Quarterfinal 1st leg	Wolfsburg (Germany)	0–2	(France) Olympique Lyonnais	Wolfsburg, Germany
20:15 CET (UTC+1)		Report	Abily 61'; Marozsán 74'	Stadium: AOK Stadion; Attendance: 3,705; Referee: Jana Adámková (Czech Republic)

29 March 2017 Quarterfinal 2nd leg	Olympique Lyonnais (France)	0–1 (2–1 agg.)	(Germany) Wolfsburg	Décines-Charpieu, France
20:45 CEST (UTC+2)		Report	Hansen 82' (pen.)	Stadium: Parc Olympique Lyonnais; Attendance: 14,128; Referee: Monika Mularczyk (Poland)

22 April 2017 Semifinal 1st leg	Manchester City (England)	1–3	(France) Olympique Lyonnais	Manchester, England
15:00 CEST (UTC+2)	Asllani 10'	Report	Kumagai 2' (pen.); Marozsán 16'; Le Sommer 68'	Stadium: Academy Stadium; Attendance: 3,614; Referee: Katalin Kulcsár (Hungary)

29 April 2017 Semifinal 2nd leg	Olympique Lyonnais (France)	0–1 (3–2 agg.)	(England) Manchester City	Décines-Charpieu, France
20:45 CEST (UTC+2)		Report	Lloyd 57'	Stadium: Parc Olympique Lyonnais; Attendance: 19,214; Referee: Esther Staubli (Switzerland)

==== Final ====
1 June 2017 Final	Olympique Lyonnais (France)	0–0	(France) Paris Saint-Germain	Cardiff, Wales
20:45 CEST (UTC+2)				Stadium: Cardiff City Stadium; Attendance: 22,433; Referee: Bibiana Steinhaus (Germany)
	Penalties
	Majri (penalty scored); Le Sommer (penalty missed); Renard (penalty scored); Mbock (penalty scored); Kumagai (penalty scored); Marozsán (penalty scored); Abily (penalty scored); Bouhaddi (penalty scored)		(penalty scored) Cristiane; (penalty scored) Delannoy; (penalty missed) Geyoro; (penalty scored) Delie; (penalty scored) Formiga; (penalty scored) Boquete; (penalty scored) Lawrence; (penalty missed) Kiedrzynek

== Squad statistics ==
As of match played 1 June 2017

=== Appearances ===
No.	Pos	Nat	Player	Total		Division 1		Coupe de France		UEFA Champions League	
No.	Pos	Nat	Player	Apps	Goals	Apps	Goals	Apps	Goals	Apps	Goals
2	MF	(France) FRA	Kenza Dali	6	1	1+1	0	3+1	1	0	0
3	DF	(France) FRA	Wendie Renard	28	8	16	6	3+1	0	8	2
5	MF	(Japan) JPN	Saki Kumagai	30	10	19	6	2	1	7+2	3
6	FW	(Norway) NOR	Andrea Norheim	1	1	0	0	0+1	1	0	0
7	MF	(France) FRA	Amel Majri	28	7	17+1	6	2	1	8	0
8	DF	(France) FRA	Jessica Houara	28	2	17+1	2	2+1	0	6+1	0
9	FW	(France) FRA	Eugénie Le Sommer	32	29	14+5	20	3+1	3	8+1	6
10	MF	(Germany) GER	Dzsenifer Marozsán	32	7	14+4	4	4+1	0	9	3
11	MF	(France) FRA	Kheira Hamraoui	14	3	5+4	0	4	3	0+1	0
12	FW	(France) FRA	Élodie Thomis	16	0	2+7	0	4+1	0	0+2	0
13	FW	(United States) USA	Alex Morgan	16	12	6+2	5	2+1	7	4+1	0
14	FW	(Norway) NOR	Ada Hegerberg	33	27	20+2	20	2+1	3	7+1	4
15	MF	(France) FRA	Aurélie Kaci	5	1	0+1	0	3+1	1	0	0
16	GK	(France) FRA	Sarah Bouhaddi	26	0	17	0	0	0	9	0
17	DF	(France) FRA	Corine Petit	15	5	4+4	3	4	1	1+2	1
18	MF	(France) FRA	Claire Lavogez	24	16	7+8	8	4	5	0+5	3
20	FW	(France) FRA	Delphine Cascarino	9	3	2+4	0	1	2	2	1
21	DF	(Canada) CAN	Kadeisha Buchanan	17	0	6+2	0	2+2	0	5	0
22	FW	(Germany) GER	Pauline Bremer	28	9	15+3	4	2+1	5	3+4	0
23	MF	(France) FRA	Camille Abily	30	15	16+3	10	2	0	9	5
24	FW	(France) FRA	Mylaine Tarrieu	14	5	5+4	3	2	0	1+2	2
26	DF	(Germany) GER	Josephine Henning	8	0	3	0	5	0	0	0
27	MF	(Sweden) SWE	Caroline Seger	26	1	15+3	0	1	0	5+2	1
29	DF	(France) FRA	Griedge Mbock	26	4	16+1	3	2	0	7	1
30	GK	(France) FRA	Méline Gérard	11	0	5	0	6	0	0	0
Players away from the club on loan:
25	DF	(France) FRA	Julie Piga	3	0	0+1	0	1+1	0	0	0
Players who appeared for Olympique Lyonnais but left during the season:

=== Goal scorers ===
Place	Position	Nation	Number	Name	Division 1	Coupe de France	UEFA Champions League	Total
1	FW	(France)	9	Eugénie Le Sommer	20	3	6	29
2	FW	(Norway)	14	Ada Hegerberg	20	3	4	27
3	MF	(France)	18	Claire Lavogez	8	5	3	16
4	MF	(France)	23	Camille Abily	10	0	5	15
5	FW	(United States)	13	Alex Morgan	5	7	0	12
6	MF	(Japan)	5	Saki Kumagai	6	2	3	11
7	FW	(Germany)	22	Pauline Bremer	4	5	0	9
8	DF	(France)	3	Wendie Renard	6	0	2	8
9	MF	(France)	7	Amel Majri	6	1	0	7
9	MF	(Germany)	10	Dzsenifer Marozsán	4	0	3	7
11	DF	(France)	17	Corine Petit	3	1	1	5
11	FW	(France)	24	Mylaine Tarrieu	3	0	2	5
13	DF	(France)	29	Griedge Mbock	3	0	1	4
14	MF	(France)	11	Kheira Hamraoui	0	3	0	0
14	FW	(France)	20	Delphine Cascarino	0	2	1	3
14				Own goal	3	0	0	3
17	DF	(France)	8	Jessica Houara	2	0	0	2
18	MF	(Sweden)	27	Caroline Seger	0	0	1	1
18	FW	(Norway)	6	Andrea Norheim	0	1	0	0
18	MF	(France)	15	Aurélie Kaci	0	1	0	0
18	MF	(France)	2	Kenza Dali	0	1	0	0
Total					103	35	32	170

=== Clean sheets ===
Place	Position	Nation	Number	Name	Division 1	Coupe de France	UEFA Champions League	Total
1	GK	(France)	16	Sarah Bouhaddi	13	0	5	18
2	GK	(France)	30	Méline Gérard	4	5	0	9
Total					17	5	5	27

=== Disciplinary record ===
Number	Nation	Position	Name	Division 1		Coupe de France		UEFA Champions League		Total	
Number	Nation	Position	Name	Booked	Sent off (straight red)	Booked	Sent off (straight red)	Booked	Sent off (straight red)	Booked	Sent off (straight red)
3	(France)	DF	Wendie Renard	2	0	0	0	2	0	4	0
5	(Japan)	MF	Saki Kumagai	0	0	0	0	1	0	1	0
11	(France)	MF	Kheira Hamraoui	1	0	0	0	0	0	1	0
14	(Norway)	FW	Ada Hegerberg	0	0	0	0	1	0	1	0
18	(France)	MF	Claire Lavogez	1	0	0	0	0	0	1	0
21	(Canada)	DF	Kadeisha Buchanan	1	0	0	0	0	0	1	0
22	(Germany)	FW	Pauline Bremer	0	0	0	0	1	0	1	0
23	(France)	MF	Camille Abily	0	0	0	0	1	0	1	0
27	(Sweden)	MF	Caroline Seger	1	0	0	0	0	0	1	0
29	(France)	DF	Griedge Mbock	0	0	1	0	0	0	1	0
Players away on loan:
Players who left Olympique Lyonnais during the season:
Total				6	0	1	0	6	0	13	0
