= 2016 SheBelieves Cup squads =

List of players competing at the inaugural edition of the SheBelieves Cup

This article lists the squads for the 2016 SheBelieves Cup, the inaugural edition of the SheBelieves Cup. The cup consisted of a series of friendly games, and was held in the United States from 3 to 9 March 2016. The four national teams involved in the tournament registered a squad of 23 players.

The age listed for each player is on 3 March 2016, the first day of the tournament. The club listed is the club for which the player last played a competitive match prior to the tournament. The nationality for each club reflects the national association (not the league) to which the club is affiliated. A flag is included for coaches that are of a different nationality than their own national team.

== Squads ==
=== England ===
Coach: (Wales) Mark Sampson

The final squad was announced on 22 February 2016.

No.	Pos.	Player	Date of birth (age)	Caps	Goals	Club
1	GK	Karen Bardsley	14 October 1984 (aged 31)			(The Football Association) Manchester City
2	DF	Lucy Bronze	28 October 1991 (aged 24)			(The Football Association) Manchester City
3	DF	Alex Greenwood	7 September 1993 (aged 22)			(The Football Association) Liverpool
4	MF	Fara Williams	25 January 1984 (aged 32)			(The Football Association) Arsenal
5	DF	Steph Houghton (captain)	23 April 1988 (aged 27)			(The Football Association) Manchester City
6	DF	Gilly Flaherty	24 August 1991 (aged 24)			(The Football Association) Chelsea
7	MF	Jordan Nobbs	8 December 1992 (aged 23)			(The Football Association) Arsenal
8	MF	Jill Scott	2 February 1987 (aged 29)			(The Football Association) Manchester City
9	FW	Jodie Taylor	17 May 1986 (aged 29)			(United States Soccer Federation) Portland Thorns
10	FW	Karen Carney	1 August 1987 (aged 28)			(The Football Association) Chelsea
11	DF	Demi Stokes	12 December 1991 (aged 24)			(The Football Association) Manchester City
12	DF	Alex Scott	14 October 1984 (aged 31)			(The Football Association) Arsenal
13	GK	Siobhan Chamberlain	15 August 1983 (aged 32)			(The Football Association) Liverpool
14	DF	Claire Rafferty	11 January 1989 (aged 27)			(The Football Association) Chelsea
15	DF	Casey Stoney	13 May 1982 (aged 33)			(The Football Association) Arsenal
16	DF	Laura Bassett	2 August 1983 (aged 32)			(The Football Association) Notts County
17	MF	Katie Chapman	15 June 1982 (aged 33)			(The Football Association) Chelsea
18	MF	Izzy Christiansen	20 September 1991 (aged 24)			(The Football Association) Manchester City
19	FW	Toni Duggan	25 July 1991 (aged 24)			(The Football Association) Manchester City
20	FW	Eniola Aluko	21 February 1987 (aged 29)			(The Football Association) Chelsea
21	GK	Carly Telford	7 July 1987 (aged 28)			(The Football Association) Notts County
22	FW	Fran Kirby	29 June 1993 (aged 22)			(The Football Association) Chelsea
23	FW	Gemma Davison	17 April 1987 (aged 28)			(The Football Association) Chelsea

=== France ===
Coach: Philippe Bergeroo

The final squad was announced on 23 February 2016. On 24 February 2016, Amandine Henry withdrew from the squad due to ongoing recovery from injury and was replaced by Viviane Asseyi. The next day, Laure Boulleau withdrew from the squad due to injury and was replaced by Sakina Karchaoui. A few days later, Karchaoui also withdrew due to injury and was replaced by Marion Torrent.

No.	Pos.	Player	Date of birth (age)	Caps	Goals	Club
1	GK	Laëtitia Philippe	30 April 1991 (aged 24)			(French Football Federation) Montpellier
2	DF	Kelly Gadéa	16 December 1991 (aged 24)			(French Football Federation) Montpellier
3	DF	Marion Torrent	17 April 1992 (aged 23)			(French Football Federation) Montpellier
4	DF	Laura Georges	20 August 1984 (aged 31)			(French Football Federation) Paris Saint-Germain
5	DF	Sabrina Delannoy	18 May 1986 (aged 29)			(French Football Federation) Paris Saint-Germain
6	MF	Viviane Asseyi	20 November 1993 (aged 22)			(French Football Federation) Montpellier
7	MF	Charlotte Bilbault	5 June 1990 (aged 25)			(French Football Federation) Juvisy
8	DF	Jessica Houara	29 September 1987 (aged 28)			(French Football Federation) Paris Saint-Germain
9	FW	Eugénie Le Sommer	18 May 1989 (aged 26)			(French Football Federation) Lyon
10	MF	Camille Abily	5 December 1984 (aged 31)			(French Football Federation) Lyon
11	FW	Claire Lavogez	18 June 1994 (aged 21)			(French Football Federation) Lyon
12	FW	Élodie Thomis	13 August 1986 (aged 29)			(French Football Federation) Lyon
13	FW	Marie-Charlotte Léger	13 March 1996 (aged 19)			(French Football Federation) Montpellier
14	MF	Louisa Nécib	23 January 1987 (aged 29)			(French Football Federation) Lyon
15	MF	Élise Bussaglia	24 September 1985 (aged 30)			(German Football Association) VfL Wolfsburg
16	GK	Sarah Bouhaddi	17 October 1986 (aged 29)			(French Football Federation) Lyon
17	MF	Aurélie Kaci	19 December 1989 (aged 26)			(French Football Federation) Lyon
18	FW	Marie-Laure Delie	29 January 1988 (aged 28)			(French Football Federation) Paris Saint-Germain
19	DF	Griedge Mbock Bathy	26 February 1995 (aged 21)			(French Football Federation) Lyon
20	FW	Kadidiatou Diani	1 April 1995 (aged 20)			(French Football Federation) Juvisy
21	GK	Méline Gérard	30 May 1990 (aged 25)			(French Football Federation) Lyon
22	DF	Amel Majri	25 January 1993 (aged 23)			(French Football Federation) Lyon
23	MF	Kheira Hamraoui	13 January 1990 (aged 26)			(French Football Federation) Paris Saint-Germain

=== Germany ===
Coach: Silvia Neid

The final squad was announced on 16 February 2016. On 23 February 2016, Felicitas Rauch withdrew from the squad due to injury and was replaced by Kathrin Hendrich. On 26 February 2016, Melanie Leupolz withdrew from the squad due to a bone edema and was replaced by Svenja Huth.

No.	Pos.	Player	Date of birth (age)	Caps	Goals	Club
1	GK	Almuth Schult	9 February 1991 (aged 25)			(German Football Association) VfL Wolfsburg
2	DF	Josephine Henning	8 September 1989 (aged 26)			(French Football Federation) Paris Saint-Germain
3	DF	Saskia Bartusiak	9 September 1982 (aged 33)			(German Football Association) FFC Frankfurt
4	DF	Leonie Maier	29 September 1992 (aged 23)			(German Football Association) Bayern Munich
5	DF	Annike Krahn	1 July 1985 (aged 30)			(German Football Association) Bayer Leverkusen
6	FW	Lina Magull	15 August 1994 (aged 21)			(German Football Association) SC Freiburg
7	MF	Melanie Behringer	18 November 1985 (aged 30)			(German Football Association) Bayern Munich
8	DF	Kathrin Hendrich	6 April 1992 (aged 23)			(German Football Association) FFC Frankfurt
9	FW	Mandy Islacker	8 August 1988 (aged 27)			(German Football Association) FFC Frankfurt
10	FW	Dzsenifer Marozsán	18 April 1992 (aged 23)			(German Football Association) FFC Frankfurt
11	FW	Anja Mittag	16 May 1985 (aged 30)			(French Football Federation) Paris Saint-Germain
12	GK	Laura Benkarth	14 October 1992 (aged 23)			(German Football Association) SC Freiburg
14	DF	Babett Peter	12 May 1988 (aged 27)			(German Football Association) VfL Wolfsburg
15	MF	Anna Blässe	27 February 1987 (aged 29)			(German Football Association) VfL Wolfsburg
16	MF	Svenja Huth	25 January 1991 (aged 25)			(German Football Association) Turbine Potsdam
17	MF	Isabel Kerschowski	22 January 1988 (aged 28)			(German Football Association) VfL Wolfsburg
18	FW	Alexandra Popp	6 April 1991 (aged 24)			(German Football Association) VfL Wolfsburg
19	FW	Lena Petermann	5 February 1994 (aged 22)			(German Football Association) SC Freiburg
20	MF	Lena Goeßling	8 March 1986 (aged 29)			(German Football Association) VfL Wolfsburg
21	GK	Lisa Weiß	29 October 1987 (aged 28)			(German Football Association) SGS Essen
22	DF	Tabea Kemme	14 December 1991 (aged 24)			(German Football Association) Turbine Potsdam
23	MF	Sara Däbritz	15 February 1995 (aged 21)			(German Football Association) Bayern Munich
24	MF	Sara Doorsoun	17 November 1991 (aged 24)			(German Football Association) SGS Essen

=== United States ===
Coach: Jill Ellis

The final squad was announced on 26 February 2016.

No.	Pos.	Player	Date of birth (age)	Caps	Goals	Club
1	GK	Hope Solo	July 30, 1981 (aged 34)			(United States Soccer Federation) Seattle Reign
2	FW	Mallory Pugh	April 29, 1998 (aged 17)			(United States Soccer Federation) Real Colorado
3	MF	Sam Mewis	October 9, 1992 (aged 23)			(United States Soccer Federation) Western New York Flash
4	DF	Becky Sauerbrunn	June 6, 1985 (aged 30)			(United States Soccer Federation) Kansas City
5	DF	Kelley O'Hara	August 4, 1988 (aged 27)			(United States Soccer Federation) Sky Blue
6	DF	Whitney Engen	November 28, 1987 (aged 28)			(United States Soccer Federation) Boston Breakers
7	DF	Meghan Klingenberg	August 2, 1988 (aged 27)			(United States Soccer Federation) Portland Thorns
8	DF	Julie Johnston	April 6, 1992 (aged 23)			(United States Soccer Federation) Chicago Red Stars
9	MF	Heather O'Reilly	January 2, 1985 (aged 31)			(United States Soccer Federation) Kansas City
10	MF	Carli Lloyd	July 16, 1982 (aged 33)			(United States Soccer Federation) Houston Dash
11	DF	Ali Krieger	July 28, 1984 (aged 31)			(United States Soccer Federation) Washington Spirit
12	FW	Christen Press	December 29, 1988 (aged 27)			(United States Soccer Federation) Chicago Red Stars
13	FW	Alex Morgan	July 2, 1989 (aged 26)			(United States Soccer Federation) Orlando Pride
14	MF	Morgan Brian	February 26, 1993 (aged 23)			(United States Soccer Federation) Houston Dash
15	DF	Emily Sonnett	November 25, 1993 (aged 22)			(United States Soccer Federation) Portland Thorns
16	FW	Crystal Dunn	July 3, 1992 (aged 23)			(United States Soccer Federation) Washington Spirit
17	MF	Tobin Heath	May 29, 1988 (aged 27)			(United States Soccer Federation) Portland Thorns
18	GK	Ashlyn Harris	October 19, 1985 (aged 30)			(United States Soccer Federation) Orlando Pride
19	DF	Jaelene Hinkle	May 28, 1993 (aged 22)			(United States Soccer Federation) Western New York Flash
20	DF	Lauren Barnes	May 31, 1989 (aged 26)			(United States Soccer Federation) Seattle Reign
21	GK	Alyssa Naeher	April 20, 1988 (aged 27)			(United States Soccer Federation) Chicago Red Stars
22	MF	Lindsey Horan	May 26, 1994 (aged 21)			(United States Soccer Federation) Portland Thorns

== Player representation ==
=== By club ===
Clubs with 3 or more players represented are listed.

Players	Club
10	(France) Lyon
7	(England) Chelsea, (England) Manchester City, (France) Paris Saint-Germain, (Germany) VfL Wolfsburg
5	(France) Montpellier, (United States) Portland Thorns
4	(England) Arsenal, (Germany) FFC Frankfurt
3	(Germany) Bayern Munich, (Germany) Freiburg, (United States) Chicago Red Stars

=== By club nationality ===
Players	Clubs
24	France
23	United States
22	England, Germany

=== By club federation ===
Players	Federation
68	UEFA
23	CONCACAF

=== By representatives of domestic league ===
National squad	Players
England	22
France	22
United States	22
Germany	21
