= 2017 SheBelieves Cup squads =

List of players competing at the 2nd edition of the SheBelieves Cup

This article lists the squads for the 2017 SheBelieves Cup, the 2nd edition of the SheBelieves Cup. The cup consisted of a series of friendly games, and was held in the United States from 1 to 7 March 2017. The four national teams involved in the tournament registered a squad of 23 players.

The age listed for each player is on 1 March 2017, the first day of the tournament. The club listed is the club for which the player last played a competitive match prior to the tournament. The nationality for each club reflects the national association (not the league) to which the club is affiliated. A flag is included for coaches that are of a different nationality than their own national team.

== Squads ==
=== England ===
Coach: (Wales) Mark Sampson

The final squad was announced on 21 February 2017. On 26 February 2017, Jo Potter withdrew from the squad due to a knee injury and was replaced by Gemma Bonner.

| No. | Pos. | Player | Date of birth (age) | Caps | Goals | Club |
|---|---|---|---|---|---|---|
| 1 | GK | Karen Bardsley | 14 October 1984 (aged 32) | | | (The Football Association) Manchester City |
| 2 | DF | Alex Scott | 14 October 1984 (aged 32) | | | (The Football Association) Arsenal |
| 3 | DF | Demi Stokes | 12 December 1991 (aged 25) | | | (The Football Association) Manchester City |
| 4 | DF | Lucy Bronze | 28 October 1991 (aged 25) | | | (The Football Association) Manchester City |
| 5 | DF | Steph Houghton | 23 April 1988 (aged 28) | | | (The Football Association) Manchester City |
| 6 | DF | Millie Bright | 21 August 1993 (aged 23) | | | (The Football Association) Chelsea |
| 7 | MF | Jordan Nobbs | 8 December 1992 (aged 24) | | | (The Football Association) Arsenal |
| 8 | MF | Jade Moore | 22 October 1990 (aged 26) | | | (The Football Association) Notts County |
| 9 | FW | Jodie Taylor | 17 May 1986 (aged 30) | | | (The Football Association) Arsenal |
| 10 | MF | Izzy Christiansen | 20 September 1991 (aged 25) | | | (The Football Association) Manchester City |
| 11 | FW | Ellen White | 9 May 1989 (aged 27) | | | (The Football Association) Birmingham City |
| 12 | DF | Rachel Daly | 6 December 1991 (aged 25) | | | (United States Soccer Federation) Houston Dash |
| 13 | GK | Siobhan Chamberlain | 15 August 1983 (aged 33) | | | (The Football Association) Liverpool |
| 14 | DF | Casey Stoney | 13 May 1982 (aged 34) | | | (The Football Association) Liverpool |
| 15 | DF | Laura Bassett | 2 August 1983 (aged 33) | | | (The Football Association) Notts County |
| 16 | DF | Gemma Bonner | 13 January 1991 (aged 26) | | | (The Football Association) Liverpool |
| 17 | MF | Fara Williams | 25 January 1984 (aged 33) | | | (The Football Association) Arsenal |
| 18 | MF | Jill Scott | 2 February 1987 (aged 30) | | | (The Football Association) Manchester City |
| 19 | FW | Toni Duggan | 25 July 1991 (aged 25) | | | (The Football Association) Manchester City |
| 20 | FW | Karen Carney | 1 August 1987 (aged 29) | | | (The Football Association) Chelsea |
| 21 | GK | Mary Earps | 7 March 1993 (aged 23) | | | (The Football Association) Reading |
| 22 | FW | Nikita Parris | 10 March 1994 (aged 22) | | | (The Football Association) Manchester City |
| 23 | FW | Rachel Williams | 10 January 1988 (aged 29) | | | (The Football Association) Notts County |

=== France ===
Coach: Olivier Echouafni

The final squad was announced on 21 February 2017.

| No. | Pos. | Player | Date of birth (age) | Caps | Goals | Club |
|---|---|---|---|---|---|---|
| 1 | GK | Laëtitia Philippe | 30 April 1991 (aged 25) | | | (French Football Federation) Montpellier |
| 2 | DF | Ève Périsset | 24 December 1994 (aged 22) | | | (French Football Federation) Paris Saint-Germain |
| 3 | DF | Wendie Renard | 20 July 1990 (aged 26) | | | (French Football Federation) Lyon |
| 4 | DF | Laura Georges | 20 August 1984 (aged 32) | | | (French Football Federation) Paris Saint-Germain |
| 5 | DF | Aïssatou Tounkara | 16 March 1995 (aged 21) | | | (French Football Federation) Juvisy |
| 6 | MF | Amandine Henry | 28 September 1989 (aged 27) | | | (French Football Federation) Paris Saint-Germain |
| 7 | MF | Sandie Toletti | 13 July 1995 (aged 21) | | | (French Football Federation) Montpellier |
| 8 | DF | Jessica Houara | 29 September 1987 (aged 29) | | | (French Football Federation) Lyon |
| 9 | FW | Eugénie Le Sommer | 18 May 1989 (aged 27) | | | (French Football Federation) Lyon |
| 10 | MF | Camille Abily | 5 December 1984 (aged 32) | | | (French Football Federation) Lyon |
| 11 | MF | Claire Lavogez | 18 June 1994 (aged 22) | | | (French Football Federation) Lyon |
| 12 | FW | Élodie Thomis | 13 August 1986 (aged 30) | | | (French Football Federation) Lyon |
| 13 | FW | Kadidiatou Diani | 1 April 1995 (aged 21) | | | (French Football Federation) Juvisy |
| 14 | FW | Camille Catala | 6 May 1991 (aged 25) | | | (French Football Federation) Juvisy |
| 15 | MF | Élise Bussaglia | 24 September 1985 (aged 31) | | | (German Football Association) VfL Wolfsburg |
| 16 | GK | Sarah Bouhaddi | 17 October 1986 (aged 30) | | | (French Football Federation) Lyon |
| 17 | MF | Gaëtane Thiney | 28 October 1985 (aged 31) | | | (French Football Federation) Juvisy |
| 18 | FW | Marie-Laure Delie | 29 January 1988 (aged 29) | | | (French Football Federation) Paris Saint-Germain |
| 19 | DF | Griedge Mbock Bathy | 26 February 1995 (aged 22) | | | (French Football Federation) Lyon |
| 20 | MF | Grace Geyoro | 2 July 1997 (aged 19) | | | (French Football Federation) Paris Saint-Germain |
| 21 | GK | Méline Gérard | 30 May 1990 (aged 26) | | | (French Football Federation) Lyon |
| 22 | MF | Amel Majri | 25 January 1993 (aged 24) | | | (French Football Federation) Lyon |
| 23 | DF | Sakina Karchaoui | 26 January 1996 (aged 21) | | | (French Football Federation) Montpellier |

=== Germany ===
Coach: Steffi Jones

The final squad was announced on 13 February 2017. On 17 February 2017, Tabea Kemme and Svenja Huth withdrew from the squad due to injuries and were replaced by Verena Faißt and Hasret Kayikçi.

| No. | Pos. | Player | Date of birth (age) | Caps | Goals | Club |
|---|---|---|---|---|---|---|
| 1 | GK | Almuth Schult | 9 February 1991 (aged 26) | | | (German Football Association) VfL Wolfsburg |
| 2 | DF | Josephine Henning | 8 September 1989 (aged 27) | | | (French Football Federation) Lyon |
| 3 | DF | Kathrin Hendrich | 6 April 1992 (aged 24) | | | (German Football Association) FFC Frankfurt |
| 4 | DF | Leonie Maier | 29 September 1992 (aged 24) | | | (German Football Association) Bayern Munich |
| 5 | DF | Babett Peter | 12 May 1988 (aged 28) | | | (German Football Association) VfL Wolfsburg |
| 7 | MF | Pauline Bremer | 10 April 1996 (aged 20) | | | (French Football Federation) Lyon |
| 9 | FW | Alexandra Popp | 6 April 1991 (aged 25) | | | (German Football Association) VfL Wolfsburg |
| 10 | MF | Dzsenifer Marozsán | 18 April 1992 (aged 24) | | | (French Football Federation) Lyon |
| 11 | FW | Anja Mittag | 16 May 1985 (aged 31) | | | (German Football Association) VfL Wolfsburg |
| 12 | GK | Laura Benkarth | 14 October 1992 (aged 24) | | | (German Football Association) SC Freiburg |
| 13 | MF | Sara Däbritz | 15 February 1995 (aged 22) | | | (German Football Association) Bayern Munich |
| 14 | DF | Anna Blässe | 27 February 1987 (aged 30) | | | (German Football Association) VfL Wolfsburg |
| 15 | FW | Mandy Islacker | 8 August 1988 (aged 28) | | | (German Football Association) FFC Frankfurt |
| 17 | DF | Isabel Kerschowski | 22 January 1988 (aged 29) | | | (German Football Association) VfL Wolfsburg |
| 18 | FW | Lena Petermann | 5 February 1994 (aged 23) | | | (German Football Association) SC Freiburg |
| 20 | FW | Lina Magull | 15 August 1994 (aged 22) | | | (German Football Association) SC Freiburg |
| 21 | GK | Lisa Weiß | 29 October 1987 (aged 29) | | | (German Football Association) SGS Essen |
| 23 | DF | Verena Faißt | 22 May 1989 (aged 27) | | | (German Football Association) Bayern Munich |
| 24 | DF | Kristin Demann | 7 April 1993 (aged 23) | | | (German Football Association) 1899 Hoffenheim |
| 26 | FW | Hasret Kayikçi | 6 November 1991 (aged 25) | | | (German Football Association) SC Freiburg |
| 27 | MF | Sara Doorsoun | 17 November 1991 (aged 25) | | | (German Football Association) SGS Essen |
| 29 | DF | Felicitas Rauch | 30 April 1996 (aged 20) | | | (German Football Association) Turbine Potsdam |
| 31 | MF | Linda Dallmann | 2 September 1994 (aged 22) | | | (German Football Association) SGS Essen |

=== United States ===
Coach: Jill Ellis

The final squad was announced on 24 February 2017.

| No. | Pos. | Player | Date of birth (age) | Caps | Goals | Club |
|---|---|---|---|---|---|---|
| 1 | GK | Alyssa Naeher | April 20, 1988 (aged 28) | | | (United States Soccer Federation) Chicago Red Stars |
| 2 | FW | Mallory Pugh | April 29, 1998 (aged 18) | | | (United States Soccer Federation) UCLA Bruins |
| 3 | MF | Sam Mewis | October 9, 1992 (aged 24) | | | (United States Soccer Federation) North Carolina Courage |
| 4 | DF | Becky Sauerbrunn | June 6, 1985 (aged 31) | | | (United States Soccer Federation) Kansas City |
| 5 | DF | Kelley O'Hara | August 4, 1988 (aged 28) | | | (United States Soccer Federation) Sky Blue |
| 6 | MF | Morgan Brian | February 26, 1993 (aged 24) | | | (United States Soccer Federation) Houston Dash |
| 7 | DF | Casey Short | August 23, 1990 (aged 26) | | | (United States Soccer Federation) Chicago Red Stars |
| 8 | DF | Julie Johnston | April 6, 1992 (aged 24) | | | (United States Soccer Federation) Chicago Red Stars |
| 9 | MF | Lindsey Horan | May 26, 1994 (aged 22) | | | (United States Soccer Federation) Portland Thorns |
| 10 | MF | Carli Lloyd | July 16, 1982 (aged 34) | | | (The Football Association) Manchester City |
| 11 | DF | Ali Krieger | July 28, 1984 (aged 32) | | | (United States Soccer Federation) Orlando Pride |
| 12 | FW | Lynn Williams | May 21, 1993 (aged 23) | | | (United States Soccer Federation) North Carolina Courage |
| 13 | FW | Alex Morgan | July 2, 1989 (aged 27) | | | (French Football Federation) Lyon |
| 14 | FW | Jessica McDonald | February 28, 1988 (aged 29) | | | (United States Soccer Federation) North Carolina Courage |
| 15 | DF | Emily Sonnett | November 25, 1993 (aged 23) | | | (United States Soccer Federation) Portland Thorns |
| 16 | MF | Rose Lavelle | May 14, 1995 (aged 21) | | | (United States Soccer Federation) Boston Breakers |
| 17 | MF | Tobin Heath | May 29, 1988 (aged 28) | | | (United States Soccer Federation) Portland Thorns |
| 18 | GK | Jane Campbell | February 17, 1995 (aged 22) | | | (United States Soccer Federation) Houston Dash |
| 19 | FW | Crystal Dunn | July 3, 1992 (aged 24) | | | (The Football Association) Chelsea |
| 20 | MF | Allie Long | August 13, 1987 (aged 29) | | | (United States Soccer Federation) Portland Thorns |
| 22 | MF | Brianna Pinto | May 24, 2000 (aged 16) | | | (United States Soccer Federation) CASL |
| 23 | FW | Christen Press | December 29, 1988 (aged 28) | | | (United States Soccer Federation) Chicago Red Stars |
| 24 | GK | Ashlyn Harris | October 19, 1985 (aged 31) | | | (United States Soccer Federation) Orlando Pride |

== Player representation ==
=== By club ===
Clubs with 3 or more players represented are listed.

| Players | Club |
|---|---|
| 14 | (France) Lyon |
| 9 | (England) Manchester City |
| 7 | (Germany) VfL Wolfsburg |
| 5 | (France) Paris Saint-Germain |
| 4 | (England) Arsenal, (France) Juvisy, (Germany) Freiburg, (United States) Chicago Red Stars, (United States) Portland Thorns |
| 3 | (England) Chelsea, (England) Liverpool, (England) Notts County, (France) Montpellier, (Germany) Bayern Munich, (Germany) Essen, (United States) Houston Dash, (United States) North Carolina Courage |

=== By club nationality ===
| Players | Clubs |
|---|---|
| 26 | France |
| 24 | England |
| 21 | Germany, United States |

=== By club federation ===
| Players | Federation |
|---|---|
| 71 | UEFA |
| 21 | CONCACAF |

=== By representatives of domestic league ===
| National squad | Players |
|---|---|
| England | 22 |
| France | 22 |
| Germany | 20 |
| United States | 20 |
