= 2017–18 Olympique Lyonnais Féminin season =

Olympique Lyonnais Féminin
2017–18 season
- Manager: Reynald Pedros
- Stadium: Groupama OL Training Center
- Division 1: Champions
- Coupe de France: Runners Up
- UEFA Champions League: Champions
- Top goalscorer: League: Ada Hegerberg (31); All: Ada Hegerberg (53)
Home colours	Away colours

The 2017–18 Olympique Lyonnais Féminin season was the club's fourteenth season since FC Lyon joined OL as its women's section. Olympique Lyonnais retained their Division 1 Féminine and UEFA Women's Champions League titles, and where Runners Up to Paris Saint-Germain in the Coupe de France Féminine.

== Season events ==
On 18 August, Olympique Lyonnais announced the signing of Lucy Bronze from Manchester City to a three-year contract.

On 29 August, Olympique Lyonnais announced the signing of Shanice van de Sanden from Liverpool to a three-year contract.

On 9 September it was announced that Amandine Henry would return to Olympique Lyonnais on a three-and-a-half-year contract from 1 January.

On 1 January, Morgan Brian joined Olympique Lyonnais from Chicago Red Stars on a contract until the summer of 2020.

== Squad ==
As of match played 31 May 2018

No.	Name	Nationality	Position	Date of birth (age)	Signed from	Signed in	Contract ends	Apps.	Goals
Goalkeepers
1	Pauline Peyraud-Magnin	(France)	GK	17 February 1992 (aged 26)	Marseille	2017		7	0
16	Sarah Bouhaddi	(France)	GK	17 October 1986 (aged 31)	Juvisy	2009		230	1
30	Romane Bruneau	(France)	GK	27 August 1996 (aged 21)	Dijon	2017		0	0
	Audrey Dupupet	(France)	GK	3 January 2001 (aged 17)	Academy	2017		0	0
Defenders
3	Wendie Renard	(France)	DF	20 July 1990 (aged 27)	Academy	2006		314	88
4	Selma Bacha	(France)	DF	9 November 2000 (aged 17)	Academy	2017		23	2
8	Jessica Houara	(France)	DF	29 September 1987 (aged 30)	Paris Saint-Germain	2016		32	2
17	Corine Petit	(France)	DF	5 October 1983 (aged 34)	Soyaux	2008		217	31
21	Kadeisha Buchanan	(Canada)	DF	5 November 1995 (aged 22)	West Virginia Mountaineers	2017		41	0
22	Lucy Bronze	(England)	DF	28 October 1991 (aged 26)	Manchester City	2017	2020	31	4
29	Griedge Mbock Bathy	(France)	DF	26 February 1995 (aged 23)	Guingamp	2015		86	16
Midfielders
5	Saki Kumagai	(Japan)	MF	17 October 1990 (aged 27)	1. FFC Frankfurt	2013		156	33
6	Amandine Henry	(France)	MF	28 September 1989 (aged 28)	Portland Thorns	2018	2021	224	44
7	Amel Majri	(France)	MF	25 January 1993 (aged 25)	Academy	2010		162	42
10	Dzsenifer Marozsán	(Germany)	MF	18 April 1992 (aged 26)	1. FFC Frankfurt	2016		63	19
11	Kheira Hamraoui	(France)	MF	13 January 1990 (aged 28)	Paris Saint-Germain	2016		42	17
15	Morgan Brian	(United States)	MF	26 February 1993 (aged 25)	Chicago Red Stars	2018	2020	5	2
23	Camille Abily	(France)	MF	5 December 1984 (aged 33)	FC Gold Pride	2010		321	204
	Yasmine Klai	(France)	MF	15 September 2002 (aged 15)	Academy	2017		0	0
	Iris Rabot	(France)	MF	16 October 2000 (aged 17)	Academy	2017		0	0
Forwards
9	Eugénie Le Sommer	(France)	FW	18 May 1989 (aged 29)	Stade Briochin	2010		259	236
12	Élodie Thomis	(France)	FW	13 August 1986 (aged 31)	Montpellier	2007		276	107
14	Ada Hegerberg	(Norway)	FW	10 July 1995 (aged 22)	Turbine Potsdam	2014		133	168
19	Shanice van de Sanden	(Netherlands)	FW	2 October 1992 (aged 25)	Liverpool	2017	2020	24	2
20	Delphine Cascarino	(France)	FW	5 February 1997 (aged 21)	Academy	2015		63	18
27	Emelyne Laurent	(France)	FW	4 November 1998 (aged 19)	Bordeaux	2017		4	3
28	Melvine Malard	(France)	FW	28 June 2000 (aged 17)	Academy	2017		1	0
	Cyrine Ben Rabah	(France)	FW	27 November 2002 (aged 15)	Academy	2017		0	0
	Jessy Danielle Roux	(France)	FW	30 March 2000 (aged 18)	Academy	2017		0	0
Out on loan
2	Kenza Dali	(France)	MF	31 July 1991 (aged 26)	Paris Saint-Germain	2016		7	1
18	Claire Lavogez	(France)	MF	18 June 1994 (aged 23)	Montpellier	2015		42	22
Left during the season
1	Erin Nayler	(New Zealand)	GK	17 April 1992 (aged 26)	Sky Blue FC	2016	2018	0	0
6	Andrea Norheim	(Norway)	FW	30 January 1999 (aged 19)	Klepp	2016		1	1
24	Mylaine Tarrieu	(France)	FW	3 January 1995 (aged 23)	Academy	2013		36	6

== Transfers ==
=== In ===
Date	Position	Nationality	Name	From	Fee	Ref.
1 July 2017	GK	(France)	Romane Bruneau	Dijon	Undisclosed	
1 July 2017	FW	(France)	Emelyne Laurent	Bordeaux	Undisclosed	
1 July 2017	DF	(France)	Clara Moreira	CS Nivolésien	Undisclosed	
1 July 2017	GK	(France)	Pauline Peyraud-Magnin	Marseille	Undisclosed	
18 August 2017	DF	(England)	Lucy Bronze	Manchester City	Undisclosed	
29 August 2017	FW	(Netherlands)	Shanice van de Sanden	Liverpool	Undisclosed	
1 January 2018	MF	(France)	Amandine Henry	Portland Thorns	Undisclosed	
1 January 2018	MF	(United States)	Morgan Brian	Chicago Red Stars	Undisclosed	

=== Out ===
Date	Position	Nationality	Name	To	Fee	Ref.
24 July 2017	GK	(New Zealand)	Erin Nayler	Bordeaux	Undisclosed	
18 August 2017	FW	(Germany)	Pauline Bremer	Manchester City	Undisclosed	
31 December 2017	FW	(France)	Mylaine Tarrieu	Rodez	Undisclosed	
1 January 2018	FW	(Norway)	Andrea Norheim	HB Køge	Undisclosed	

=== Loans out ===
Start date	Position	Nationality	Name	To	End date	Ref.
1 January 2018	MF	(France)	Kenza Dali	Lille	30 June 2018	
1 January 2018	MF	(France)	Claire Lavogez	Fleury	30 June 2018	

=== Released ===
Date	Position	Nationality	Name	Joined	Date	Ref.
5 June 2018	DF	(France)	Corine Petit	Retired		
5 June 2018	MF	(France)	Camille Abily	Retired		
5 June 2018	FW	(France)	Élodie Thomis	Retired		
19 June 2018	MF	(United States)	Morgan Brian	Chicago Red Stars	19 June 2018	
30 June 2018	GK	(France)	Romane Bruneau	Bordeaux		
30 June 2018	GK	(France)	Pauline Peyraud-Magnin	Arsenal	12 July 2018	
30 June 2018	MF	(France)	Kenza Dali	Dijon		
30 June 2018	MF	(France)	Jessica Houara	Retired		
30 June 2018	MF	(France)	Claire Lavogez	Bordeaux		

== Friendlies ==
v

== Competitions ==
=== Overview ===
Competition	First match	Last match	Starting round	Final position	Record							
Competition	First match	Last match	Starting round	Final position	Pld	W	D	L	GF	GA	GD	Win %
Division 1	3 September 2017	27 May 2018	Matchday 1	Winners	22	21	1	0	104	5	+99	95.45
Coupe de France	7 January 2018	31 May 2018	Round of 64	Runners-up	6	5	0	1	56	1	+55	83.33
UEFA Champions League	4 October 2017	24 May 2018	Round of 32	Winners	9	8	1	0	38	2	+36	88.89
Total					37	34	2	1	198	8	+190	91.89

Last updated: 31 May 2018
Source: Competitions

=== Division 1 ===
==== Results summary ====
Overall								Home						Away					
Pld	W	D	L	GF	GA	GD	Pts	W	D	L	GF	GA	GD	W	D	L	GF	GA	GD
22	21	1	0	103	6	+97	64	11	0	0	63	4	+59	10	1	0	40	2	+38

Last updated: 25 May 2018.

==== Results by matchday ====
Matchday	1	2	3	4	5	6	7	8	9	10	11	12	13	14	15	16	17	18	19	20	21	22
Ground	H	A	H	A	H	A	H	A	H	A	H	H	A	H	A	H	A	H	A	H	A	A
Result	W	W	W	W	W	W	W	W	W	W	W	W	W	W	W	W	W	W	W	W	D	W
Position	1	2	1	1	1	1	1	1	1	1	1	1	1	1	1	1	1	1	1	1	1	1

Updated to match(es) played on 25 May 2018. Source: Results
A = Away; H = Home; W = Win; D = Draw; L = Loss; P = Postponed

==== Results ====
3 September 2017 1	Olympique Lyonnais	7–0	Rodez	Décines-Charpieu
16:00 CEST (UTC+2)	Hegerberg 9', 10', 40', 82'; Le Sommer 25', 81'; Hamraoui 78'	Report	Bonet (yellow card) 35'	Stadium: Stade Gérard Houllier; Referee: Florence Guillemin

9 September 2017 2	Guingamp	0–5	Olympique Lyonnais	Saint-Brieuc
18:00 CEST (UTC+2)		Report	Le Sommer 24'; Renard 26'; Kumagai 38' (pen.); Hegerberg 59'; Marozsán 80'	Stadium: Stade Fred Aubert; Referee: Céline Bagrowski

24 September 2017 3	Olympique Lyonnais	9–2	Paris FC	Décines-Charpieu
15:00 CEST (UTC+2)	Declercq 16' (o.g.); Le Sommer 21', 62'; Butel 24' (o.g.); Abily 29', 57'; Deville 31' (o.g.); Hegerberg 65', 77'	Report	Thiney 45' (pen.); Butel (yellow card) 61'; Soyer (yellow card) 72'; Otaki 90+2'	Stadium: Stade Gérard Houllier; Referee: Victoria Beyer

30 September 2017 4	Montpellier	0–5	Olympique Lyonnais	Montpellier
14:30 CEST (UTC+2)	Romanelli (yellow card) 77'; Virginia (yellow card) 80'	Report	Hegerberg 23'; Karchaoui 51' (o.g.); Le Sommer 59' (yellow card) 80'; Hamraoui 66'; Kumagai (yellow card) 74'; Marozsán 90+2'	Stadium: Stade Bernard Gasset; Referee: Florence Guillemin

8 October 2017 5	Olympique Lyonnais	2–0	Girondins Bordeaux	Décines-Charpieu
15:00 CEST (UTC+2)	Hamraoui 10'; Laurent 28'	Report	Rodrigues (yellow card) 56'	Stadium: Stade Gérard Houllier; Referee: Solen Dallongeville

15 October 2017 6	Soyaux	0–5	Olympique Lyonnais	Angoulême
16:30 CEST (UTC+2)		Report	Le Sommer 3', 31'; Hegerberg 10'; Bronze 14'; Renard 81'	Stadium: Stade Camille Lebon; Referee: Stephanie di Benedetto

28 October 2017 7	Olympique Lyonnais	6–0	Lille OSC	Décines-Charpieu
18:45 CEST (UTC+2)	Abily 7', 21' van de Sanden 9'; Hegerberg 17', 42'; Majri 90+2'	Report	Bultel (yellow card) 38'	Stadium: Stade Gérard Houllier; Referee: Anaelle Loidon

4 November 2017 8	Albi	0–5	Olympique Lyonnais	Albi
17:00 CET (UTC+1)	Cazes (yellow card) 54'; Pantelić (yellow card) 67'	Report	Hegerberg 2'; Le Sommer 56'; Kumagai 68' (pen.); Abily 73'; Mbock 90'	Stadium: Stade Maurice Rigaud; Referee: Helene Burban

19 November 2017 9	Olympique Lyonnais	5–0	Fleury 91	Décines-Charpieu
14:30 CET (UTC+1)	Marozsán 34'; Hegerberg 48'; Kumagai 67' (pen.); Le Sommer 75'; Cascarino 84'	Report		Stadium: Stade Gérard Houllier; Referee: Elodie Coppola

2 December 2017 10	Olympique Marseille	0–5	Olympique Lyonnais	Martigues
18:00 CET (UTC+1)		Report	Renard 11'; Hegerberg 50', 55'; Bronze 58'; Hamraoui 68'	Stadium: Stade Francis Turcan; Referee: Céline Bagrowski

11 December 2017 11	Olympique Lyonnais	1–0	Paris Saint-Germain	Décines-Charpieu
21:00 CET (UTC+1)	Hegerberg 12'; Hamraoui (yellow card) 16'; Marozsán (yellow card) 37'	Report	Lawrence (yellow card) 44'	Stadium: Groupama OL Training Center; Referee: Florence Guillemin

17 December 2017 12	Olympique Lyonnais	4–0	Guingamp	Décines-Charpieu
14:30 CET (UTC+1)	Hegerberg 8', 61'; Le Sommer 27'; Marozsán 66'	Report		Stadium: Stade Gérard Houllier; Referee: Stephanie di Benedetto

14 January 2018 13	Paris FC	0–4	Olympique Lyonnais	Bondoufle
14:30 CET (UTC+1)	Jauréna (yellow card) 62'	Report	Hegerberg 53', 84', 87'; Hamraoui 90+3'	Stadium: Stade Robert Bobin; Referee: Florence Guillemin

5 February 2018 14	Olympique Lyonnais	2–1	Montpellier	Décines-Charpieu
21:00 CET (UTC+1)	Marozsán 43', 68'	Report	Sembrant 90+2'	Stadium: Stade Gérard Houllier; Referee: Élodie Coppola

18 February 2018 15	Girondins Bordeaux	0–4	Olympique Lyonnais	Saint-Médard-en-Jalles
15:00 CET (UTC+1)	Chatelin (red card) 40'; Lardez (yellow card) 76'	Report	Kumagai 40' (pen.); Le Sommer 77', 87'; Marozsán 84' (pen.)	Stadium: Complexe Sportif Robert Monseau; Referee: Victoria Beyer

11 March 2018 16	Olympique Lyonnais	5–0	Soyaux	Décines-Charpieu
14:00 CET (UTC+1)	Kumagai 29' (pen.); Majri 50', 55'; Hegerberg 58'; Abily 71'; Bronze (yellow card) 90'	Report		Stadium: Stade Gérard Houllier; Referee: Maika Vanderstichel

17 March 2018 17	Lille OSC	1–10	Olympique Lyonnais	Villeneuve-d'Ascq
18:30 CET (UTC+1)	Sarr 45'	Report	Cascarino 1'; Le Sommer 7'; Hegerberg 11', 54'; Marozsán 31'; Henry 49'; Renard 51'; Abily 58'; Gautrat 86'; Hamraoui 90+1'	Stadium: Stadium Lille Métropole; Referee: Florence Guillemin

1 April 2018 18	Olympique Lyonnais	4–0	Albi	Décines-Charpieu
15:00 CEST (UTC+2)	Marozsán 12', 70'; Majri 27'; Lavogez 45'; Hegerberg 68', 75'	Report	Mitchai (yellow card) 38'	Stadium: Stade Gérard Houllier; Referee: Stephanie di Benedetto

2 May 2018 19	Fleury 91	1–3	Olympique Lyonnais	Fleury-Mérogis
15:00 CEST (UTC+2)	Haupais (yellow card) 86'	Report	Hegerberg 13', 47' van de Sanden 59'	Stadium: Stade Auguste Gentelet; Referee: Elodie Coppola

13 May 2018 20	Olympique Lyonnais	7–0	Olympique Marseille	Décines-Charpieu
16:30 CEST (UTC+2)	Mbock 26', 74'; Hegerberg 59', 77'; Hamraoui 65'; Buchanan (yellow card) 70'; Henry 72', 90'	Report	Laplacette (yellow card) 88'	Stadium: Stade Gérard Houllier; Referee: Anaelle Loidon

18 May 2018 21	Paris Saint-Germain	0–0	Olympique Lyonnais	Saint-Germain-en-Laye
21:00 CEST (UTC+2)	Katoto (yellow card) 42'; Diallo (yellow card) 72'	Report		Stadium: Georges Lefèvre; Referee: Victoria Beyer

27 May 2018 22	Rodez	0–6	Olympique Lyonnais	Rodez
15:00 CEST (UTC+2)		Report	Laurent 8'; Hegerberg 21'; Abily 34', 41'; Le Sommer 67', 70'	Stadium: Stade Paul-Lignon; Referee: Anaelle Loidon

==== Table ====
Pos	Team	Pld	W	D	L	GF	GA	GD	Pts	Qualification or relegation
1	Lyon (C)	22	21	1	0	104	5	+99	64	Qualification for the Champions League Round of 32
2	Paris Saint-Germain	22	18	2	2	59	13	+46	56	Qualification for the Champions League Round of 32
3	Montpellier	22	17	2	3	63	22	+41	53	
4	Paris FC	22	8	6	8	31	37	−6	30	
5	Soyaux	22	6	6	10	18	36	−18	24	
6	Lille	22	6	5	11	24	47	−23	23	
7	Bordeaux	22	5	7	10	19	33	−14	22	
8	Fleury	22	6	4	12	22	45	−23	22	
9	Rodez	22	5	7	10	22	52	−30	22	
10	Guingamp	22	6	4	12	17	33	−16	22	
11	Albi (R)	22	5	5	12	12	37	−25	20	Relegation to Division 2 Féminine
12	Marseille (R)	22	3	3	16	16	47	−31	12	Relegation to Division 2 Féminine

Source: Soccerway FFF
Rules for classification: 1) points; 2) head-to-head; 3) head-to-head goal difference; 4) goal difference; 5) goals scored
(C) Champions; (R) Relegated

=== Coupe de France ===
7 January 2018 Round of 64	Racing Besançon	0–20	Olympique Lyonnais	Orléans
CET (UTC+1)			Hegerberg 2', 50', 61', 77'; Le Sommer 3', 36', 39', 70'; Majri 7', 11'; Cascarino 15', 55'; Marozsán 20', 79'; Abily 43', 75'; Renard 47'; Hamraoui 59', 76'; Lombardot 68' (o.g.)	Stadium: Stade Omnisports de la Source; Referee: Victoria Beyer

28 January 2018 Round of 32	Olympique Lyonnais	10–0	Yzeure Allier Auvergne	Décines-Charpieu
13:30 CET (UTC+1)	Le Sommer 7', 33', 44'; Renard 12', 64'; Petit 32'; Marozsán 49'; Bacha 61'; Abily 70' (yellow card) 85'; Hamraoui 72'			Stadium: Groupama Academy Stadium; Attendance: 676; Referee: Lisa Coste

11 February 2018 Round of 16	Olympique Lyonnais	11–0	Toulouse	Décines-Charpieu
12:00 CET (UTC+1)	Cascarino 12'; Le Sommer 20', 48', 84'; Mbock 24'; Hamraoui 43', 90+1'; Abily 54', 87'; Gautrat 68'; Laurent 73'		Palou (yellow card) 84'	Stadium: Groupama Academy Stadium; Attendance: 473; Referee: Stéphanie Di Benedetto

15 April 2018 Quarterfinal	Arras	0–11	Olympique Lyonnais	Arras
14:00 CEST (UTC+2)			Hegerberg 2', 6'; Cascarino 5'; Hamraoui 19', 52'; Abily 30'; Lefevre 38', 90+2' (o.g.); Denis 57' (o.g.); Bacha 69'; Le Sommer 90+1'	Stadium: Stade Degouve-Brabant; Attendance: 1,428; Referee: Victoria Beyer

7 May 2018 Semifinal	Olympique Lyonnais	4–0	Montpellier	Décines-Charpieu
20:00 CEST (UTC+2)	Le Sommer 19'; Majri 54'; Henry 56'; Marozsán (yellow card) 67'; Hegerberg 83'		Virginia (yellow card) 68'	Stadium: Groupama Academy Stadium; Attendance: 1,092; Referee: Maika Vanderstichel

31 May 2018 Final	Olympique Lyonnais	0–1	Paris Saint-Germain	Strasbourg
20:00 CEST (UTC+2)	Le Sommer (yellow card) 40'; Henry (yellow card) 41' van de Sanden (yellow card) 52'		Katoto 16'; Delie (yellow card) 29'; Endler (yellow card) 81'; Diani (yellow card) 90+2'	Stadium: Stade de la Meinau; Attendance: 12,480; Referee: Florence Guillemin

=== UEFA Champions League ===
4 October 2017 Round of 32 1st leg	Medyk Konin (Poland)	0–5	(France) Olympique Lyonnais	Konin, Poland
15:15 CEST (UTC+2)	Balcerzak (yellow card) 44'	Report	Hegerberg 11', 29', 67'; Renard 32'; Le Sommer 83'	Stadium: Stadion im. Złotej Jedenastki Kazimierza Górskiego w Koninie; Attendance: 1,200; Referee: Anastasia Romanyuk (Ukraine)

11 October 2017 Round of 32 2nd leg	Olympique Lyonnais (France)	9–0 (14–0 agg.)	(Poland) Medyk Konin	Décines-Charpieu, France
18:30 CEST (UTC+2)	Majri 22'; Hegerberg 29', 39'; Bronze 32'; Renard 38', 62', 88'; Abily 43'; Kumagai 65' (pen.)	Report	Kaletka (yellow card) 64'; Sałata (yellow card) 82'	Stadium: Parc Olympique Lyonnais; Attendance: 4,822; Referee: Vivian Peeters (Netherlands)

8 November 2017 Round of 16 1st leg	BIIK Kazygurt (Kazakhstan)	0–7	(France) Olympique Lyonnais	Shymkent, Kazakhstan
07:00 CET (UTC+1)	Adule (yellow card) 70'	Report	Hegerberg 5', 19' (pen.), 73', 90'; Abily 44'; Majri 47'; Le Sommer 75'	Stadium: BIIK Stadium; Attendance: 250; Referee: Sofia Karagiorgi (Cyprus)

15 November 2017 Round of 16 2nd leg	Olympique Lyonnais (France)	9–0 (16–0 agg.)	(Kazakhstan) BIIK Kazygurt	Décines-Charpieu, France
20:30 CET (UTC+1)	Majri 12'; Hegerberg 32', 36', 46', 58' (pen.); Abily 43', 69', 83'; Cascarino 73'	Report		Stadium: Groupama Academy Stadium; Attendance: 509; Referee: Silvia Domingos (Portugal)

22 March 2018 Quarterfinal 1st leg	Olympique Lyonnais (France)	2–1	(Spain) Barcelona	Décines-Charpieu, France
18:45 CET (UTC+1)	Cascarino (yellow card) 36'; Marozsán 44'; Hegerberg 80' van de Sanden (yellow card) 90+1'	Report	León (yellow card) 40'; Guijarro 72'	Stadium: Parc Olympique Lyonnais; Attendance: 15,104; Referee: Pernilla Larsson (Sweden)

28 March 2018 Quarterfinal 2nd leg	Barcelona (Spain)	0–1 (1–3 agg.)	(France) Olympique Lyonnais	Barcelona, Spain
19:00 CEST (UTC+2)		Report	Le Sommer 62'	Stadium: Mini Estadi; Attendance: 12,178; Referee: Sandra Bastos (Portugal)

22 April 2018 Semifinal 1st leg	Manchester City (England)	0–0	(France) Olympique Lyonnais	Manchester, England
14:00 CEST (UTC+2)	Stokes (yellow card) 63'	Report	Bronze (yellow card) 26'	Stadium: Academy Stadium; Attendance: 2,876; Referee: Bibiana Steinhaus (Germany)

29 April 2018 Semifinal 2nd leg	Olympique Lyonnais (France)	1–0 (1–0 agg.)	(England) Manchester City	Décines-Charpieu, France
14:45 CEST (UTC+2)	Bronze 17'	Report		Stadium: Parc Olympique Lyonnais; Attendance: 20,837; Referee: Katalin Kulcsár (Hungary)

==== Final ====
24 May 2018 Final	Wolfsburg (Germany)	1–4 (a.e.t.)	(France) Olympique Lyonnais	Kyiv, Ukraine
18:00 CEST (UTC+2)	Popp (yellow card) 72' (yellow-red card) 96'; Maritz (yellow card) 80'; Harder 93'	Report	Bacha (yellow card) 61'; Henry 98'; Le Sommer 99'; Hegerberg 103'; Renard (yellow card) 107'; Abily 116'	Stadium: Valeriy Lobanovskyi Dynamo Stadium; Attendance: 14,237; Referee: Jana Adámková (Czech Republic)

== Squad statistics ==
As of match played 31 May 2018

=== Appearances ===
No.	Pos	Nat	Player	Total		Division 1		Coupe de France		UEFA Champions League	
No.	Pos	Nat	Player	Apps	Goals	Apps	Goals	Apps	Goals	Apps	Goals
1	GK	(France) FRA	Pauline Peyraud-Magnin	7	0	1	0	5	0	1	0
3	DF	(France) FRA	Wendie Renard	30	12	17	5	5	3	8	4
4	DF	(France) FRA	Selma Bacha	23	2	8+3	0	5+1	2	6	0
5	MF	(Japan) JPN	Saki Kumagai	32	6	17+4	5	3+1	0	6+1	1
6	MF	(France) FRA	Amandine Henry	17	5	6+1	3	3+2	1	5	1
7	MF	(France) FRA	Amel Majri	32	9	16+3	3	4	3	9	3
8	DF	(France) FRA	Jessica Houara	4	0	3	0	1	0	0	0
9	FW	(France) FRA	Eugénie Le Sommer	34	33	16+4	17	5+1	12	8	4
10	MF	(Germany) GER	Dzsenifer Marozsán	31	12	16+2	8	5	3	8	1
11	MF	(France) FRA	Kheira Hamraoui	28	14	9+10	7	2+2	7	2+3	0
12	FW	(France) FRA	Élodie Thomis	11	0	1+8	0	1	0	0+1	0
14	FW	(Norway) NOR	Ada Hegerberg	33	53	20	31	4	7	9	15
15	MF	(United States) USA	Morgan Gautrat	5	2	2+2	1	1	1	0	0
16	GK	(France) FRA	Sarah Bouhaddi	30	0	21	0	1	0	8	0
17	DF	(France) FRA	Corine Petit	13	1	3+4	0	2+1	1	1+2	0
19	FW	(Netherlands) NED	Shanice van de Sanden	24	2	14+2	2	1+2	0	2+3	0
20	FW	(France) FRA	Delphine Cascarino	33	7	7+12	2	3+3	4	3+5	1
21	DF	(Canada) CAN	Kadeisha Buchanan	24	0	15+1	0	4	0	4	0
22	DF	(England) ENG	Lucy Bronze	31	4	19	2	4	0	8	2
23	MF	(France) FRA	Camille Abily	34	21	16+5	9	4+1	6	5+3	6
27	FW	(France) FRA	Emelyne Laurent	4	3	2	2	0+1	1	0+1	0
28	FW	(France) FRA	Melvine Malard	1	0	0	0	0	0	0+1	0
29	DF	(France) FRA	Griedge Mbock	26	4	12+3	3	3+1	1	6+1	0
Players away from the club on loan:
Players who appeared for Olympique Lyonnais but left during the season:
24	FW	(France) FRA	Mylaine Tarrieu	2	0	1	0	0	0	0+1	0

=== Goal scorers ===
Place	Position	Nation	Number	Name	Division 1	Coupe de France	UEFA Champions League	Total
1	FW	(Norway)	14	Ada Hegerberg	31	7	15	53
2	FW	(France)	9	Eugénie Le Sommer	17	12	4	33
3	MF	(France)	23	Camille Abily	9	6	6	21
4	MF	(France)	11	Kheira Hamraoui	7	7	0	14
5	MF	(Germany)	10	Dzsenifer Marozsán	8	3	1	12
5	DF	(France)	3	Wendie Renard	5	3	4	12
7	MF	(France)	7	Amel Majri	3	3	3	9
8				Own goal	4	4	0	8
9	FW	(France)	20	Delphine Cascarino	2	4	1	7
10	MF	(Japan)	5	Saki Kumagai	5	0	1	6
11	MF	(France)	6	Amandine Henry	3	1	1	5
12	DF	(France)	29	Griedge Mbock	3	1	0	4
12	DF	(England)	22	Lucy Bronze	2	0	2	4
14	FW	(France)	27	Emelyne Laurent	2	1	0	3
15	FW	(Netherlands)	19	Shanice van de Sanden	2	0	0	2
15	MF	(United States)	15	Morgan Gautrat	1	1	0	2
15	MF	(France)	26	Selma Bacha	0	2	0	2
18	DF	(France)	17	Corine Petit	0	1	0	1
Total					104	56	38	198

=== Clean sheets ===
Place	Position	Nation	Number	Name	Division 1	Coupe de France	UEFA Champions League	Total
1	GK	(France)	16	Sarah Bouhaddi	17	1	6	24
2	GK	(France)	1	Pauline Peyraud-Magnin	1	4	1	6
Total					18	5	7	30

=== Disciplinary record ===
Number	Nation	Position	Name	Division 1		Coupe de France		UEFA Champions League		Total	
Number	Nation	Position	Name	Booked	Sent off (straight red)	Booked	Sent off (straight red)	Booked	Sent off (straight red)	Booked	Sent off (straight red)
3	(France)	DF	Wendie Renard	0	0	0	0	1	0	1	0
4	(France)	DF	Selma Bacha	0	0	0	0	1	0	1	0
5	(Japan)	MF	Saki Kumagai	1	0	0	0	0	0	1	0
6	(France)	MF	Amandine Henry	0	0	1	0	0	0	1	0
9	(France)	FW	Eugénie Le Sommer	1	0	1	0	0	0	2	0
10	(Germany)	MF	Dzsenifer Marozsán	1	0	1	0	0	0	2	0
11	(France)	MF	Kheira Hamraoui	2	0	0	0	0	0	2	0
19	(Netherlands)	FW	Shanice van de Sanden	0	0	1	0	1	0	2	0
20	(France)	FW	Delphine Cascarino	0	0	0	0	1	0	1	0
21	(Canada)	DF	Kadeisha Buchanan	1	0	0	0	0	0	1	0
22	(England)	DF	Lucy Bronze	1	0	0	0	1	0	2	0
23	(France)	MF	Camille Abily	0	0	1	0	0	0	1	0
Players away on loan:
Players who left Olympique Lyonnais during the season:
Total				7	0	5	0	5	0	17	0
