= Aurélie Kaci =

French footballer (born 1989)

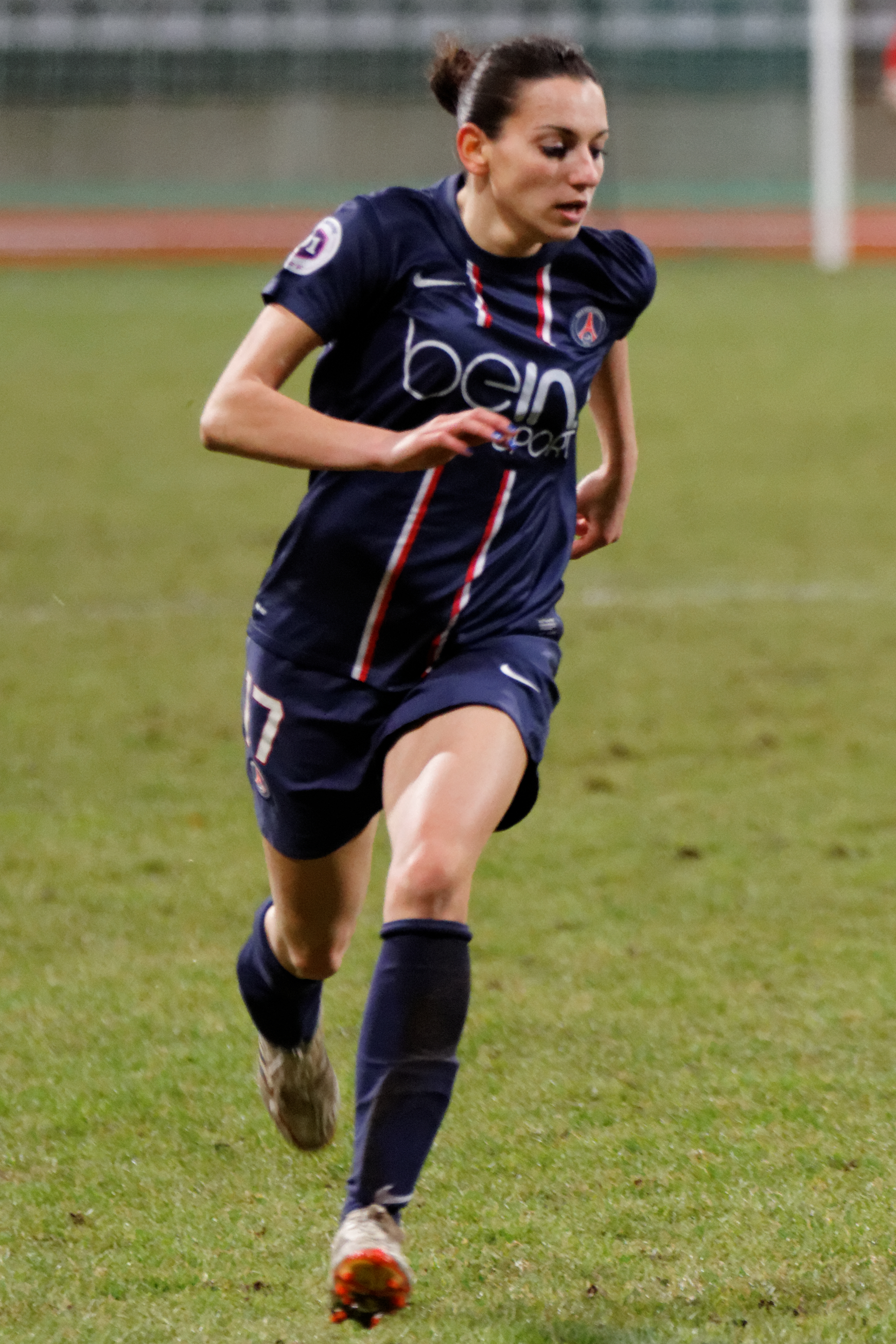
- Kaci with Paris Saint-Germain in 2012

Personal information
- Date of birth: 19 December 1989 (age 36)
- Place of birth: Lyon, France
- Height: 1.60 m (5 ft 3 in)
- Position: Defensive midfielder

Team information
- Current team: Juárez
- Number: 18

Youth career
- 1997–2004: ASCEM Villeurbanne
- 2004–2006: Lyon

Senior career*
Years	Team	Apps	(Gls)
2006–2012	Lyon	57	(1)
2012–2015	Paris Saint-Germain	56	(7)
2015–2017	Lyon	18	(0)
2017–2019	Atlético de Madrid	39	(2)
2019–2020	CD Tacón	19	(2)
2020–2022	Real Madrid	49	(5)
2022–2024	América	76	(9)
2024–	Juárez	20	(0)

International career^{‡}
2007	France U19	2	(1)
2013–2016	France	7	(0)
- * Club domestic league appearances and goals as of 30 May 2024 ‡ National team caps and goals as of 11 April 2016

Aurélie Kaci (French pronunciation: [ɔʁeli kasi]; born 19 December 1989) is a French professional footballer for Liga MX Femenil side Juárez.

== Early life ==
Born in Lyon and raised in Villeurbanne, Kaci began playing football with club ASCEM Villeurbanne until she joined FC Lyon in 2002.

== Club career ==
=== Olympique Lyonnais ===
Kaci played her first official match with Olympique Lyonnais on 12 February 2006 during the team's 6–1 win against Besançon RC in the Challenge de France. She scored her first goal in the 85th minute of the match.

At the age of 16, Kaci played her first regular season match for Olympique Lyonnais on 3 September 2006, the first day of the 2006–2007 season. Her debut came during a 3–0 win against ASJ Soyaux after coming in during the 79th minute. During her first season with the team, she made six appearances.

During the next two seasons, she played in four matches in Division 1 and changed regularly with the club's reserve team in Division 3. Kaci increased her playing time with the Division 1 squad during the 2009–2010 season where she played in almost all league games. She scored her first goal against AS Saint-Étienne helping Lyon defeat the team 5–0.

=== Paris Saint-Germain ===
Out of contract with Lyon at the end of the 2011–2012 season, Kaci left Olympique Lyonnais and signed with Paris Saint-Germain for the 2012–2013 season. During the 2012–13 season, she started in 20 of the 22 matches in which she appeared and scored two goals.

=== Olympique Lyonnais ===
In 2015, Kaci returned to Lyon by signing a two-year deal with the current Division 1 champions. While playing for Lyon, she won two additional championship titles in each of the Division 1, the Coupe de France, and the UEFA Women's Champions League. She was injured in May 2016, therefore missing that year's Division 1 finals and the Olympic games.

=== Atlético de Madrid ===
In 2017, Kaci signed to play in the Liga Feminina Iberdrola, becoming the first French player to play for Atlético de Madrid.

=== CD Tacón ===
In 2019, Kaci signed for CD Tacón in the Primera División.

== International career ==
Kaci was selected to represent the France national team starting in 2013, making her first appearance on 25 October in a match against Poland.

In 2015, she was selected to be an alternate for the World Cup, but forfeited her selection due to a quadriceps injury. On 27 October 2015, Kaci started in her first national team game in a qualifying match for the UEFA Women's Euro 2017.

The next year, she was on the roster for the 2016 She Believes Cup, but did not play. A torn ligament suffered in May that year prevented her from playing in the Olympics.

== Career statistics ==
=== Club ===
As of 1 June 2017

Club	Season	League		Cup		Continental		Total	
Club	Season	Apps	Goals	Apps	Goals	Apps	Goals	Apps	Goals
Lyon	2006–07	6	0	1	0	-	-	7	0
Lyon	2007–08	3	0	-	-	-	-	3	0
Lyon	2008–09	1	0	-	-	-	-	1	0
Lyon	2009–10	18	1	4	2	2	0	24	3
Lyon	2010–11	17	0	3	0	6	0	26	0
Lyon	2011–12	12	0	5	1	5	0	22	1
Total		57	1	13	3	13	0	83	4
Paris SG	2012–13	22	2	5	0	-	-	27	2
Paris SG	2013–14	16	1	-	-	2	0	18	1
Paris SG	2014–15	18	4	3	0	9	1	30	5
Total		56	7	8	0	11	1	75	8
Lyon	2015–16	17	0	5	2	8	0	30	2
Lyon	2016–17	1	0	4	1	-	-	5	1
Total		18	0	9	3	8	0	35	3
Career total		131	8	33	8	31	1	196	17

=== International ===
As of 11 April 2016

Appearances and goals by national team and year
National team	Year	Apps	Goals
France	2013	1	0
France	2014	1	0
France	2015	4	0
France	2016	1	0
Total		7	0

== Honors ==
=== Club ===
- Division 1 Féminine (Champions of France): Winner 2006–07, 2007–08, 2008–09, 2009–10, 2010–11, 2011–12, 2015–16, 2016-17
- Coupe de France Féminine: Winner 2007–2008, 2011–2012, 2015–2016, 2016–17
- UEFA Women's Champions League: Winner 2010–11, 2011–12, 2015–16, 2016-17

Club América

- Liga MX Femenil: Clausura 2023
