= Méline Gérard =

French footballer (born 1990)

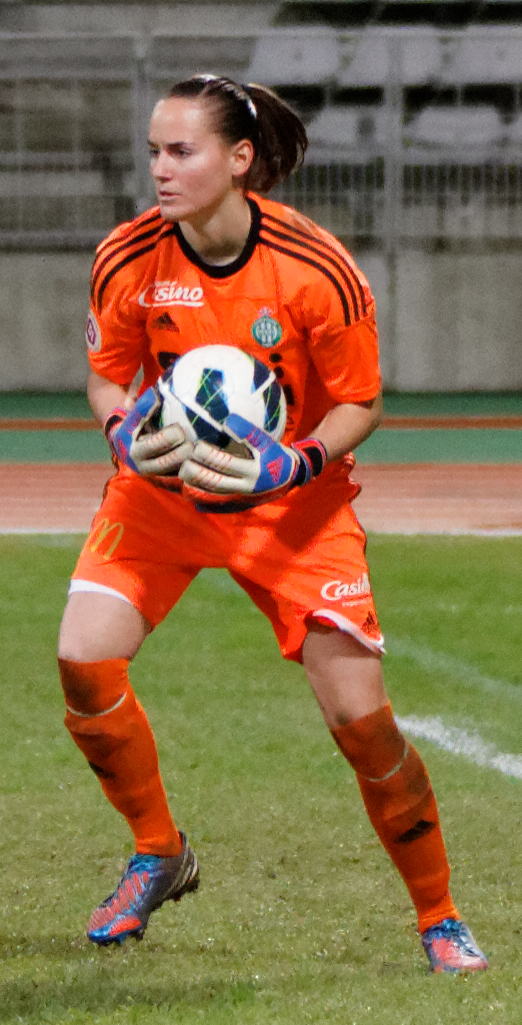
- Gérard with Saint-Étienne in 2012

Personal information
- Full name: Méline Orlane Christine Gérard
- Date of birth: 30 May 1990 (age 36)
- Place of birth: Massy, France
- Height: 1.68 m (5 ft 6 in)
- Position: Goalkeeper

Youth career
- 1998–2000: Massy 91
- 2000–2007: Montigny

Senior career*
| Years | Team | Apps | (Gls) |
| 2007–2008 | Paris Saint-Germain | 15 | (0) |
| 2008–2010 | Montigny | 43 | (0) |
| 2010–2014 | Saint-Étienne | 85 | (0) |
| 2014–2017 | Lyon | 21 | (0) |
| 2017–2019 | Montpellier | 13 | (0) |
| 2019–2021 | Betis | 54 | (0) |
| 2021–2023 | Real Madrid | 7 | (0) |
| Total | | 238 | (0) |

International career
| 2006 | France U17 | 2 | (0) |
| 2007–2008 | France U19 | 5 | (0) |
| 2008–2010 | France U20 | 5 | (0) |
| 2012–2014 | France U23 | 3 | (0) |
| 2015–2017 | France | 14 | (0) |
- * Club domestic league appearances and goals

Méline Orlane Christine Gérard (born 30 May 1990) is a French former professional footballer who played as a goalkeeper.

During her career, Gérard won three league titles, three league cups and two Champions Leagues.

== Career ==
=== Lyon ===
On 23 June 2014, Gérard was announced at Lyon on a three year contract. She made her league debut against Issy on 5 October 2014.

=== Montpellier ===
On 4 July 2017, Gérard was announced at Montpellier. She made her league debut against ASPTT Albi on 3 September 2017.

=== Real Betis ===
On 23 July 2019, Gérard was announced at Real Betis. She made her league debut against Madrid CFF on 8 September 2019. On 22 September 2019, she was substituted at half time due to an injury.

=== Real Madrid ===
On 12 July 2021, Gérard was announced at Real Madrid. She played 10 games for Real Madrid during her time there.

== Coaching career ==
After her retirement, she joined Lyon's backroom staff as an assistant coach.

== International career ==
Gérard was called up to the French national team for the first time in September 2014, but didn't make any appearances. She made her international debut on 4 March 2015 in an Algarve Cup match against Portugal.

Gérard was called up to the France squad for the 2015 FIFA Women's World Cup.

Gérard was called up to the France squad for the 2016 Summer Olympics.

Gérard was called up to the France squad for the UEFA Women's Euro 2017.

Gérard started the match and kept a clean sheet as France won the 2017 SheBelieves Cup for the first time.

== Career statistics ==
=== International ===
Appearances and goals by national team and year
| National team | Year | Apps | Goals |
|---|---|---|---|
| France | 2015 | 6 | 0 |
| France | 2016 | 3 | 0 |
| France | 2017 | 5 | 0 |
| Total | | 14 | 0 |

== Honours ==
Lyon

- UEFA Women's Champions League: 2015–16, 2016–17
- Division 1 Féminine: 2014–15, 2015–16, 2016–17
- Coupe de France: 2014–15, 2015–16, 2016–17

France

- SheBelieves Cup: 2017
