= Stade Camille-Lebon =

Football stadium in Angoulême, France

Stade Lebon
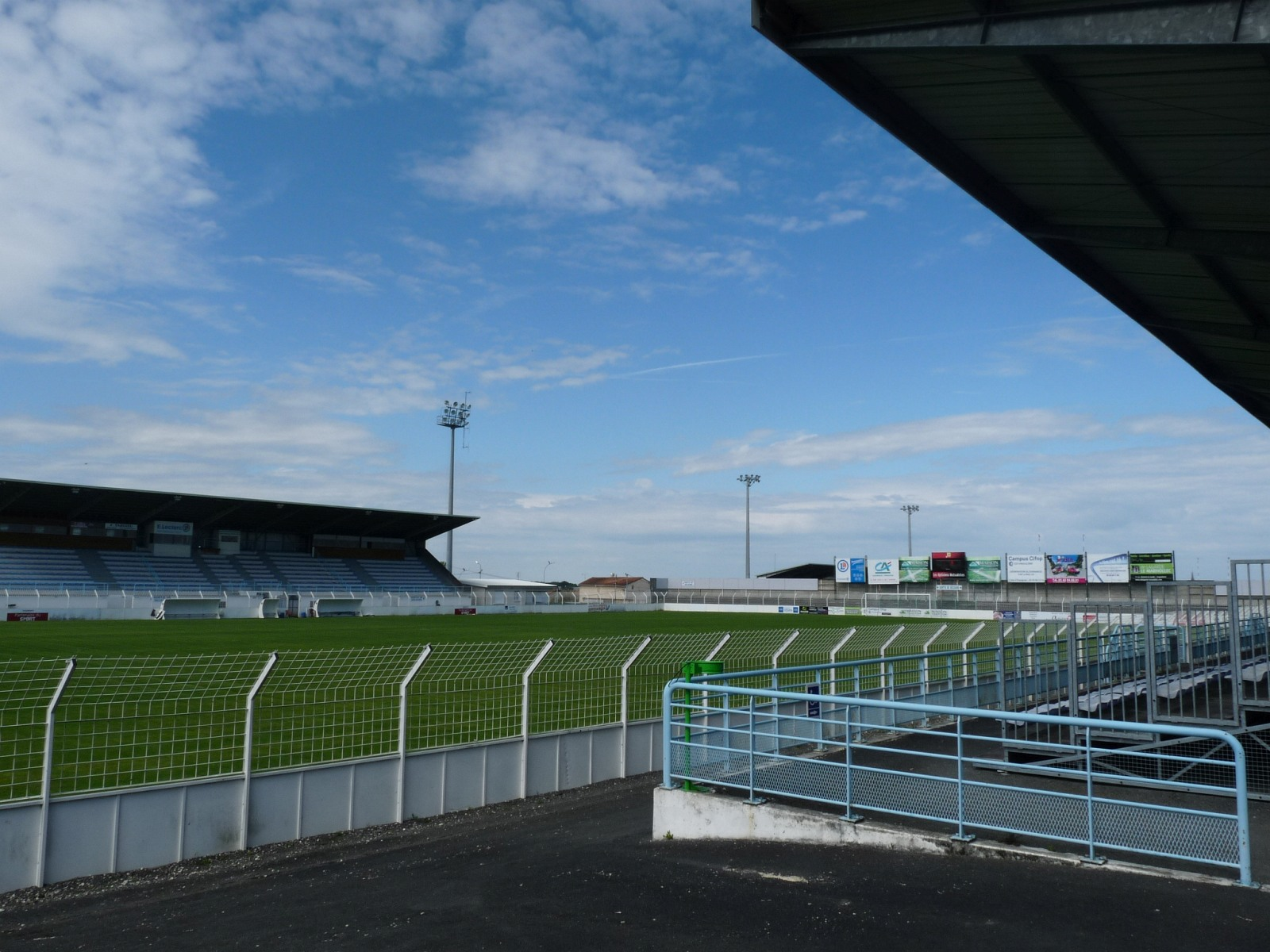
- The stadium in 2016
- Interactive map of Stade Lebon
- Full name: Stade Camille-Lebon
- Location: Angoulême, France
- Coordinates: 45°38′30.82″N 0°10′34.06″E
- Owner: City of Angoulême
- Capacity: 6,500 (1,927 seated)
- Surface: Grass

Construction
- Opened: 1932
- Renovated: 1969

Tenant
- Angoulême Charente FC

The Stade Camille-Lebon (French pronunciation: [stad kamij ləbɔ̃]) is a stadium in Angoulême, France. It is used mostly for football matches and is the home ground of Angoulême Charente FC. The stadium is able to hold 6,500 people.
