= Mylaine Tarrieu =

Martinican footballer (born 1995)

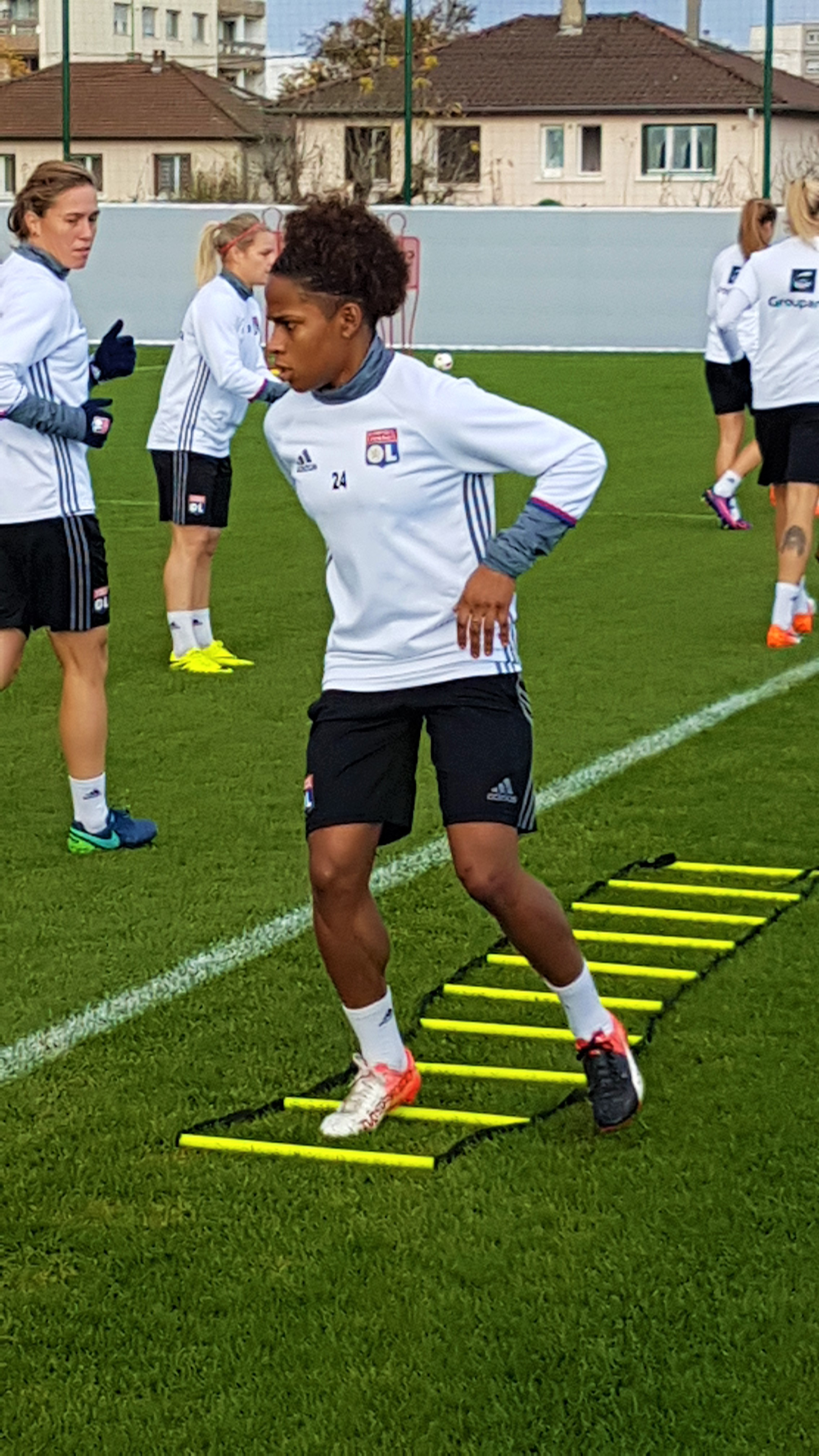
- Tarrieu with Lyon in 2016

Personal information
- Date of birth: 3 January 1995 (age 31)
- Place of birth: Lamentin, Martinique
- Height: 1.61 m (5 ft 3 in)
- Position: Forward

Senior career*
Years	Team	Apps	(Gls)
2015–2018	Lyon	23	(3)
2018	→ Bordeaux (loan)	9	(0)
2018–2020	Bordeaux	3	(1)
2020–2022	Dijon FCO	27	(1)
2022–2023	Rodez AF	15	(1)
2023–2024	Bordeaux	9	(0)

International career^{‡}
2014	France U20	4	(1)
2023–	Martinique	4	(3)
- * Club domestic league appearances and goals as of 3 December 2023 ‡ National team caps and goals as of 16 December 2023

Mylaine Tarrieu (born 3 January 1995) is a Martinican professional footballer who plays as a midfielder for the Martinique women's national team.

== International career ==
Tarrieu has represented France at the youth level.

== Honors ==
=== Lyon ===
- UEFA Women's Champions League: 2015–16
