= Jessica Houara =

French footballer (born 1987)

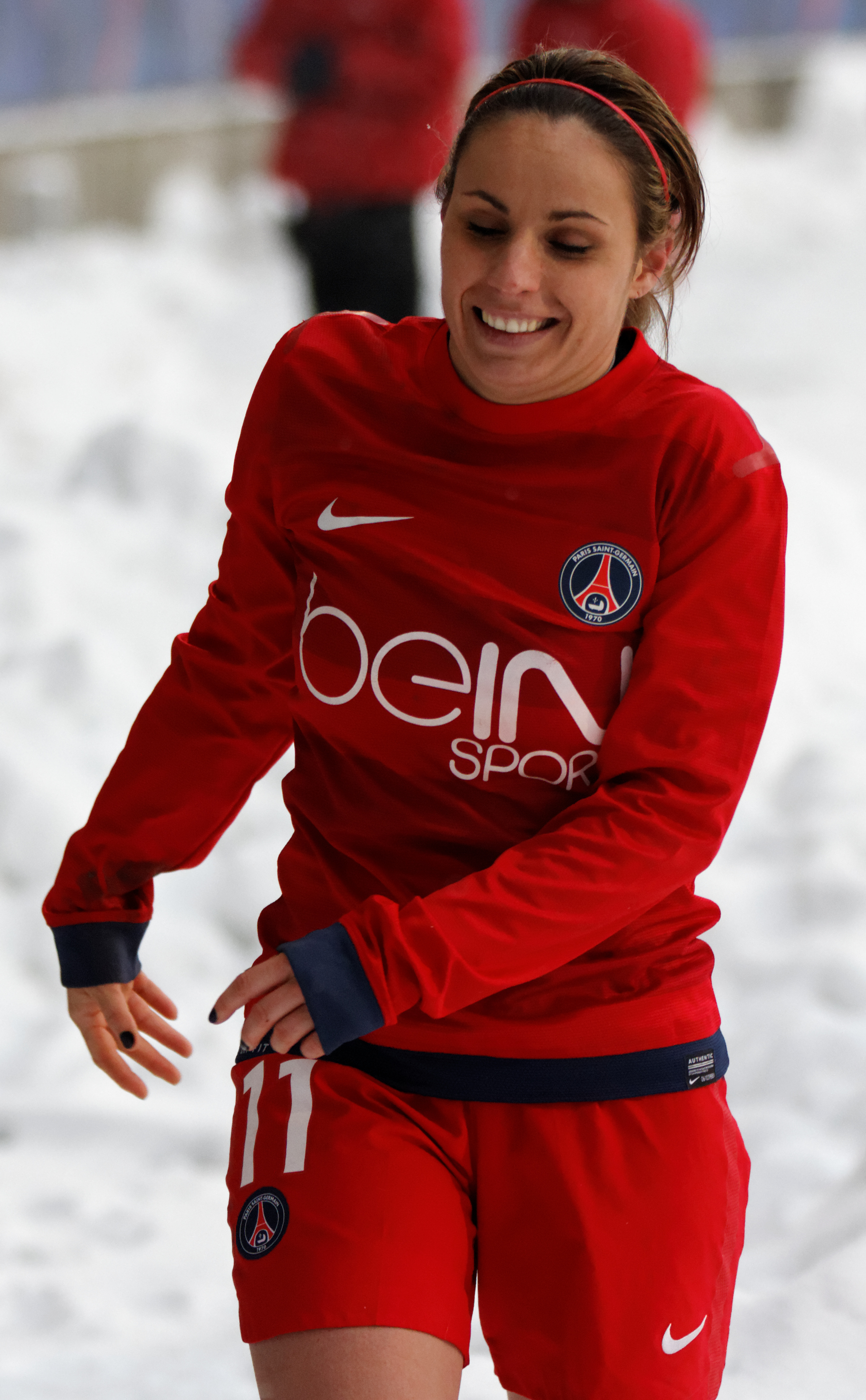
- Jessica Houara with PSG in 2013

Personal information
- Full name: Jessica Lucetta Léone Houara-d'Hommeaux
- Date of birth: 29 September 1987 (age 39)
- Place of birth: Angers, France
- Height: 1.61 m (5 ft 3 in)
- Position: Midfielder

Youth career
- 2000–2003: Angers CB

Senior career*
Years	Team	Apps	(Gls)
2003–2006	CNFE Clairefontaine	45	(7)
2006–2007	Celtic de Marseille	14	(8)
2007–2009	Saint-Étienne	41	(3)
2009–2016	Paris Saint-Germain	117	(13)
2016–2018	Lyon	21	(2)

International career^{‡}
2006	France U19	10	(4)
2006	France U20	4	(1)
2006–2007	France U21	3	(0)
2008–2018	France	64	(3)
- * Club domestic league appearances and goals as of 20 June 2018 ‡ National team caps and goals as of 20 June 2018

Jessica Lucetta Léone Houara-d'Hommeaux (née Houara) (born 29 September 1987) is a former French football player who played as a midfielder for Paris Saint-Germain, Lyon and other French clubs, and for the France national team.

== Club career ==
Jessica Houara made her debut at Croix Blanche Angers club, then joined Celtic de Marseille Women and AS Saint-Étienne.

She then signed with PSG for 7 years. With the Paris club, she won a Coupe de France in 2010, and finished second in the championship five times.

In 2016, she joined Olympique Lyonnais. On 18 November 2018, she and Lyon played against PSG - her former club, Lyon then lost 0-1. In the same year, she left Lyon after two years of serious knee injury. She announced her retirement at the same time as her pregnancy.

== International career ==
Jessica Houara was selected for various national youth team. With the under-19, she was a runner-up in the UEFA European U19 Championship in 2005 and 2006.

With the under-20s, she was called up to French's squad for the 2006 Under-20 World Cup. The French team reached the quarter-finals of the competition, but get knocked-out by U20 North Korea.

She made her debut for the senior France national team on 8 March 2008 in a friendly match against Morocco.

== Career statistics ==
Correct as of 2018

Club	Season	League		Cup		Continental		Total	
Club	Season	Apps	Goals	Apps	Goals	Apps	Goals	Apps	Goals
CNFE Clairefontaine	2003–04	18	4	0	0	0	0	18	4
CNFE Clairefontaine	2004–05	13	2	0	0	0	0	13	2
CNFE Clairefontaine	2005–06	14	1	0	0	0	0	14	1
CNFE Clairefontaine	Total	45	7	0	0	0	0	45	7
Celtic de Marseille	2006–07	14	8	0	0	0	0	14	8
Celtic de Marseille	Total	14	8	0	0	0	0	14	8
Saint-Etienne	2007–08	20	2	1	0	0	0	21	2
Saint-Etienne	2008–09	21	1	3	0	0	0	24	1
Saint-Etienne	Total	41	3	4	0	0	0	45	3
Paris SG	2009–10	19	3	4	1	0	0	23	4
Paris SG	2010–11	22	4	1	0	0	0	26	4
Paris SG	2011–12	21	3	4	1	3	0	28	4
Paris SG	2012–13	19	0	5	0	0	0	24	0
Paris SG	2013–14	18	2	2	0	2	0	22	2
Paris SG	2014–15	18	1	3	0	8	0	29	1
Paris SG	2015–16	13	0						
Paris SG	Total	117	13	19	2	13	0	152	15
Lyon	2016–17	18	2						
Lyon	2017–18	3	0						
Lyon	Total	21	2						
Career total		238	33	23	2	13	0	256	33

== International goals ==
#	Date	Venue	Opponent	Score	Result	Competition
1	8 February 2015	Stade du Moustoir, Lorient, France	United States	2–0	2–0	Friendly
2	27 November 2015	Qemal Stafa Stadium, Tirana, Albania	Albania	0–1	0–6	UEFA Women's Euro 2017 qualifying
3	27 November 2015	Qemal Stafa Stadium, Tirana, Albania	Albania	0–2	0–6	UEFA Women's Euro 2017 qualifying
Correct as of 27 November 2015

== Honours ==
=== Club ===
==== Lyon ====
- UEFA Women's Champions League: 2017–18

Paris Saint-Germain

- Coupe de France féminine: 2010

=== National team ===
- SheBelieves Cup: 2017
