= Griedge Mbock =

French footballer (born 1995)

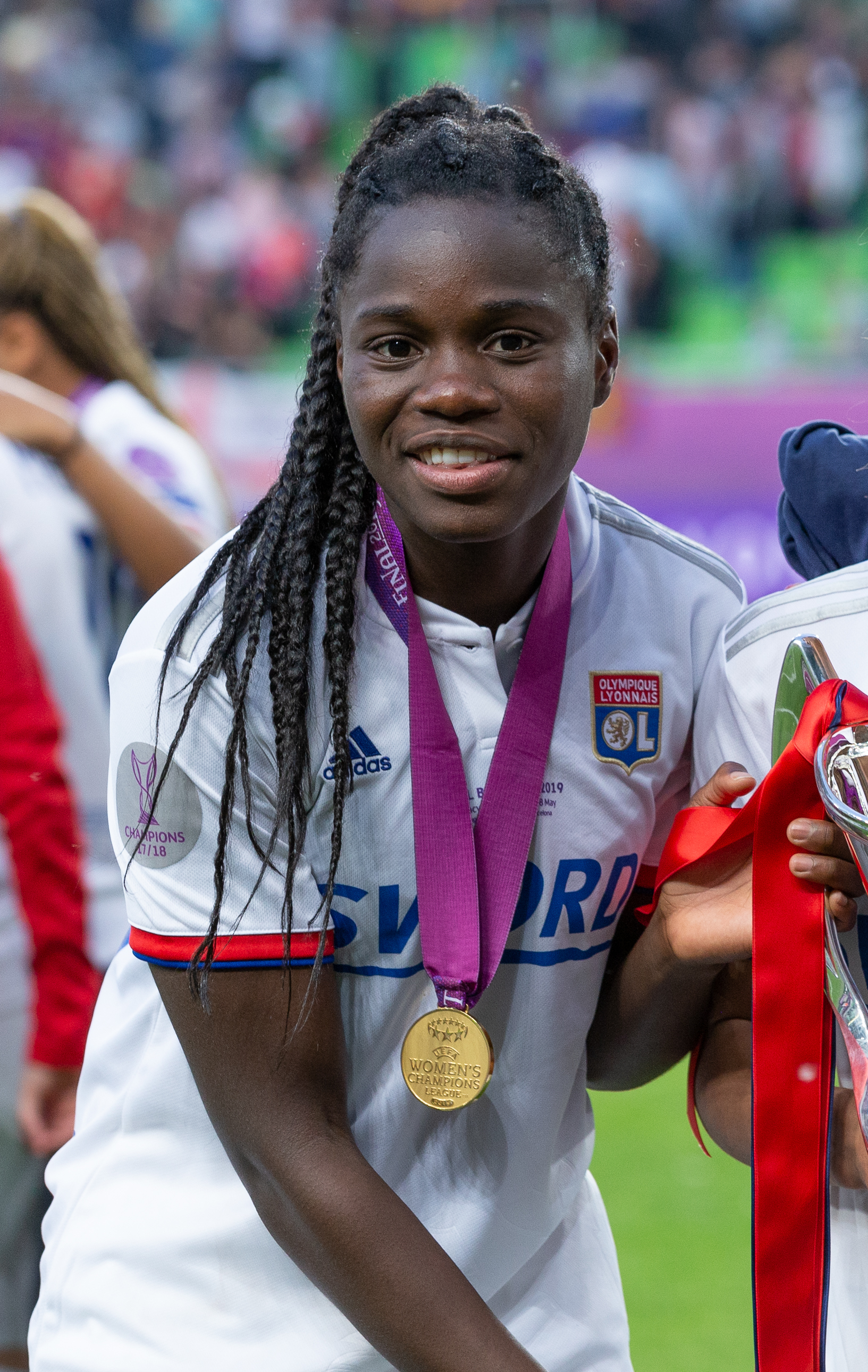
- Mbock with Lyon in 2019

Personal information
- Full name: Griedge Yinda Colette Mbock Bathy Nka
- Date of birth: 26 February 1995 (age 31)
- Place of birth: Brest, France
- Height: 1.72 m (5 ft 8 in)
- Position: Centre-back

Team information
- Current team: Paris Saint-Germain
- Number: 29

Youth career
- 2001–2006: SC Pontanézen
- 2006–2010: AS Brestoise
- 2010–2012: Guingamp

Senior career*
Years	Team	Apps	(Gls)
2010–2015	Guingamp	86	(9)
2015–2024	Lyon	117	(24)
2024–	Paris Saint-Germain	32	(6)

International career^{‡}
2010–2012	France U17	28	(4)
2013	France U19	11	(3)
2014	France U20	8	(1)
2013–	France	99	(9)
Medal record
Women's football
Representing France
UEFA Women's Nations League
Runner-up	2024
Third place	2025
- * Club domestic league appearances and goals as of 14 November 2026 ‡ National team caps and goals as of 10 October 2026

Griedge Yinda Colette Mbock Bathy Nka (born 26 February 1995) is a French professional footballer who plays as a centre-back for Première Ligue club Paris Saint-Germain and the France national team.

== Club career ==
Mbock was born in Brest to a family of Cameroonian and Malagasy descent. A strong centre-back, she joined Stade Briochin in 2010, which merged with En Avant de Guingamp in 2011. After four seasons with Guingamp, she moved to Lyon on a four-year deal. Lyon paid 100,000 euros for her, making her the most expensive transfer in the history of the Première Ligue. In June 2024, Mbock Bathy left Lyon after nine years, winning over twenty trophies, playing 193 times and scoring 36 goals.

On 3 July 2024, Mbock joined Paris Saint-Germain on a three-year contract until June 2027.

== International career ==
With the French under-17 team, Mbock played in the 2012 FIFA U-17 Women's World Cup in Azerbaijan. She was named FIFA's Player of the Tournament after France won a penalty shootout in the final over North Korea, marking the occasion with a memorable dance routine.

At the 2013 UEFA Women's Under-19 Championship, Mbock was suspended for the final after being sent off in the semi-final. In the final France beat England 2–0 after extra time.

On 23 November 2013, Mbock made her senior France debut in a 10–0 win over Bulgaria. She scored her first international goals against South Africa on 22 January 2017, scoring in the 9th and 34th minute.

Mbock was called up to the final 23–player France squad for the 2015 FIFA Women's World Cup.

Mbock was called up to the France squad for the 2016 Summer Olympics.

On 30 May 2017, Mbock was named in the France squad for the UEFA Women's Euro 2017.

On 2 May 2019, Mbock was named in the France squad for the 2019 FIFA Women's World Cup.

Mbock was called up to the France squad for the UEFA Women's Euro 2022 in May 2022. During the Euros, she scored against Belgium on 14 July 2022, scoring in the 41st minute.

Mbock was called up to the France squad for the 2024 Summer Olympics.

== Personal life ==
Griedge's brother, Hiang'a Mbock, is also a professional footballer.

== Career statistics ==
=== International ===
As of match played 10 October 2026

Appearances and goals by national team and year
National team	Year	Apps	Goals
France	2013	2	0
France	2014	5	0
France	2015	7	0
France	2016	12	0
France	2017	11	2
France	2018	10	2
France	2019	11	1
France	2020	2	1
France	2021	2	0
France	2022	9	2
France	2023	5	0
France	2024	9	0
France	2025	11	1
France	2026	3	0
Total		99	9

Scores and results list France's goal tally first, score column indicates score after each Mbock Bathy goal.

List of international goals scored by Griedge Mbock Bathy
No.	Date	Venue	Opponent	Score	Result	Competition
1	22 January 2017	Stade Jean-Ivoula, Saint-Denis, Réunion, France	South Africa	1–0	2–0	Friendly
2	22 January 2017	Stade Jean-Ivoula, Saint-Denis, Réunion, France	South Africa	2–0	2–0	Friendly
3	9 October 2018	Stade des Alpes, Grenoble, France	Cameroon	1–0	6–0	Friendly
4	9 October 2018	Stade des Alpes, Grenoble, France	Cameroon	6–0	6–0	Friendly
5	8 April 2019	Stade de la Meinau, Strasbourg, France	Denmark	3–0	4–0	Friendly
6	10 March 2020	Stade du Hainaut, Valenciennes, France	Netherlands	2–2	3–3	Friendly
7	25 June 2022	Stade Pierre Brisson, Beauvais, France	Cameroon	2–0	4–0	Friendly
8	14 July 2022	New York Stadium, Rotherham, England	Belgium	2–1	2–1	UEFA Women's Euro 2022

== Honours ==
Lyon

- Division 1 Féminine: 2015–16, 2016–17, 2017-18, 2018-19, 2019–20
- Coupe/Challenge de France: 2015–16, 2016–17, 2018–19, 2019–20
- UEFA Women's Champions League: 2015–16, 2016–17, 2017–18, 2018–19, 2019–20, 2021–22
- Trophée des Championnes: 2019

France

- SheBelieves Cup: 2017

France U17

- FIFA U-17 Women's World Cup: 2012

Individual

- FIFA U-17 Women's World Cup Golden Ball winner: 2012
- UNFP Division 1 Féminine Young Player of the Year: 2015–16
- UNFP Première Ligue team of the year: 2023–24
