= Claire Lavogez =

French footballer (born 1994)

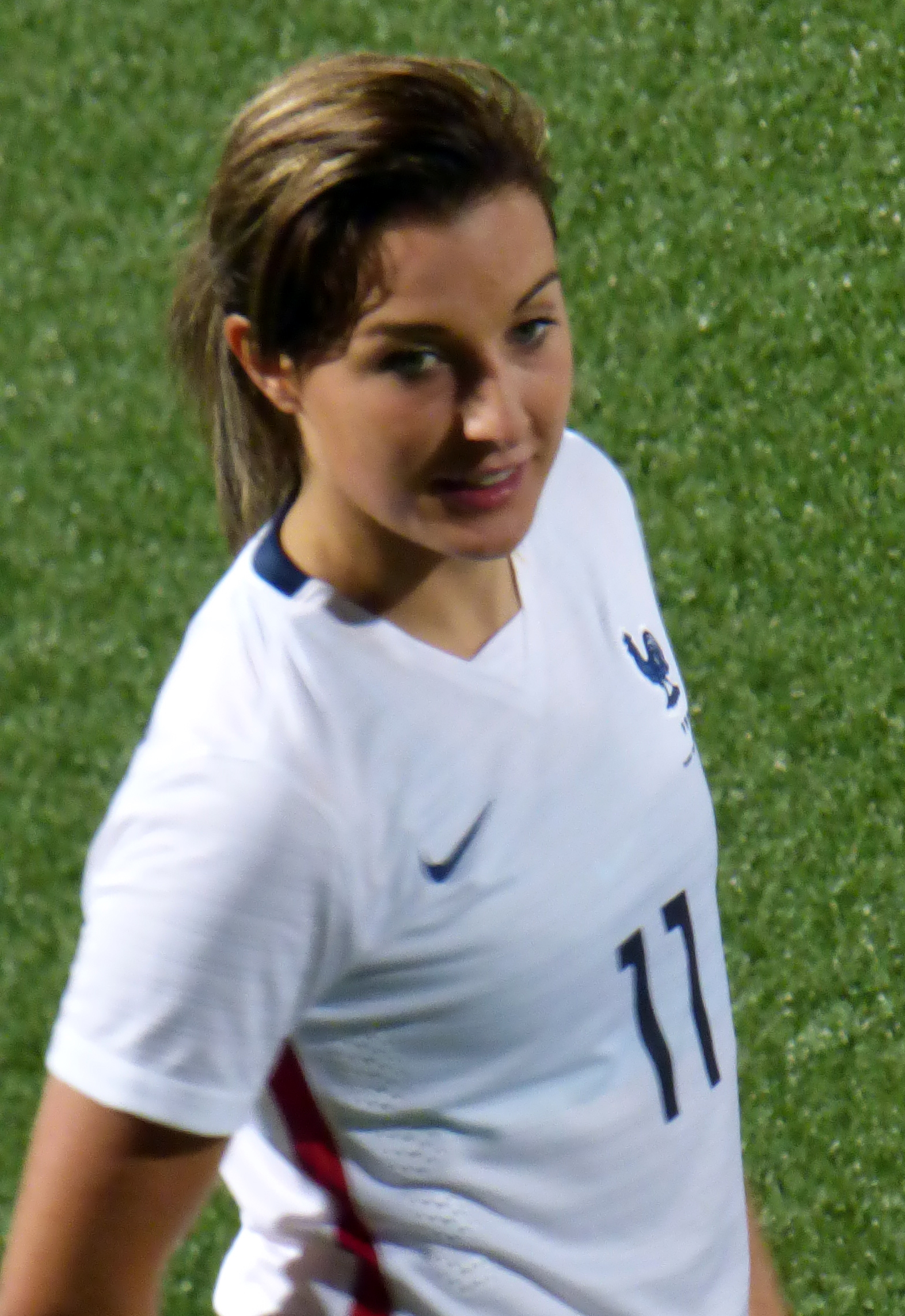
- Lavogez with France in 2015

Personal information
- Full name: Claire Marie Annie Lavogez
- Date of birth: 18 June 1994 (age 32)
- Place of birth: Calais, France
- Height: 1.73 m (5 ft 8 in)
- Position: Midfielder

Team information
- Current team: Marseille
- Number: 20

Youth career
- 2001–2008: AS Marck
- 2008–2009: Calais RUFC

Senior career*
Years	Team	Apps	(Gls)
2009–2010	Gravelines	14	(5)
2010–2011	Hénin-Beaumont	17	(3)
2011–2015	Montpellier	60	(15)
2015–2018	Lyon	26	(10)
2018	→ Fleury (loan)	11	(4)
2018–2022	Bordeaux	68	(15)
2022–2024	Kansas City Current	28	(4)
2024–2026	Real Sociedad	30	(3)
2026–	Marseille	3	(0)

International career
2009–2010	France U16	6	(1)
2009–2011	France U17	19	(11)
2012–2013	France U19	13	(5)
2014	France U20	7	(4)
2018	France U23	4	(2)
2014–2017	France	35	(3)
- * Club domestic league appearances and goals as of 18:09, 9 December 2024 (UTC)

Claire Marie Annie Lavogez (born 18 June 1994) is a French professional footballer who plays as a midfielder for Première Ligue club Marseille.

== Club career ==
A midfielder, she joined Lyon on a three-year deal in 2015.

On 20 July 2022, NWSL club Kansas City Current announced the signing of Lavogez on a contract until the end of the 2023 season. She made her league debut against San Diego Wave on 7 August 2022. Lavogez scored her first league goal against North Carolina Courage on 14 August 2022, scoring in the 79th minute. On 31 January 2024, she signed a one year extension with the club. On 1 August 2024, Lavogez announced her departure from the club.

On 12 August 2024, Liga F club Real Sociedad Femenino announced that they had signed Lavogez to a contract through the end of the 2024–25 season.

== International career ==
With the French under-20 team, Lavogez played in the 2014 FIFA U-20 Women's World Cup and scored a celebrated goal against Costa Rica. She ended the tournament with 4 goals in 6 games earning her the 2014 FIFA U-20 Women's World Cup Bronze Ball as the third best player in the tournament. Lavogez and France finished in 3rd place, defeating North Korea in the Bronze medal match. She made her made her senior France debut in a 2–0 win over Germany on 25 October 2014. Lavogez scored her first international goal against Denmark on 6 March 2015, scoring in the 43rd minute.

Lavogez was called up to the final 23-player squad on 23 April 2015 for the 2015 FIFA Women's World Cup. In the quarter-final, substitute Lavogez had her crucial penalty saved by Nadine Angerer in France's penalty shootout defeat by Germany. Lavogez also attracted criticism for a "comically bad" dive during regulation time.

Lavogez competed for France at the 2016 Summer Olympics.

Lavogez was called up to the France squad for the UEFA Women's Euro 2017.

Lavogez was called up to the France squad for the 2017 SheBelieves Cup. France won the tournament for the first time.

== Career statistics ==
As of 30 July 2017

Appearances and goals by national team and year
National team	Year	Apps	Goals
France	2014	3	0
France	2015	11	1
France	2016	13	2
France	2017	8	0
Total		35	3

As of match played 30 July 2017

Scores and results list France's goal tally first, score column indicates score after each Lavogez goal.

List of international goals scored by Claire Lavogez
No.	Date	Venue	Opponent	Score	Result	Competition
1	6 March 2015	Stadium Bela Vista, Parchal, Portugal	Denmark	4–0	4–1	2015 Algarve Cup
2	16 July 2016	Stade Charléty, Paris, France	China	3–0	3–0	Friendly
3	16 September 2016	Stade des Alpes, Grenoble, France	Brazil	1–0	1–1	Friendly

== Honours ==
Lyon

- Division 1 Féminine: 2015–16, 2016–17
- Coupe/Challenge de France: 2015–16, 2015–16
- UEFA Women's Champions League: 2015–16, 2016–17

France U19

- UEFA Women's Under-19 Championship: 2013

France

- SheBelieves Cup: 2017
