= Josephine Henning =

German footballer (born 1989)

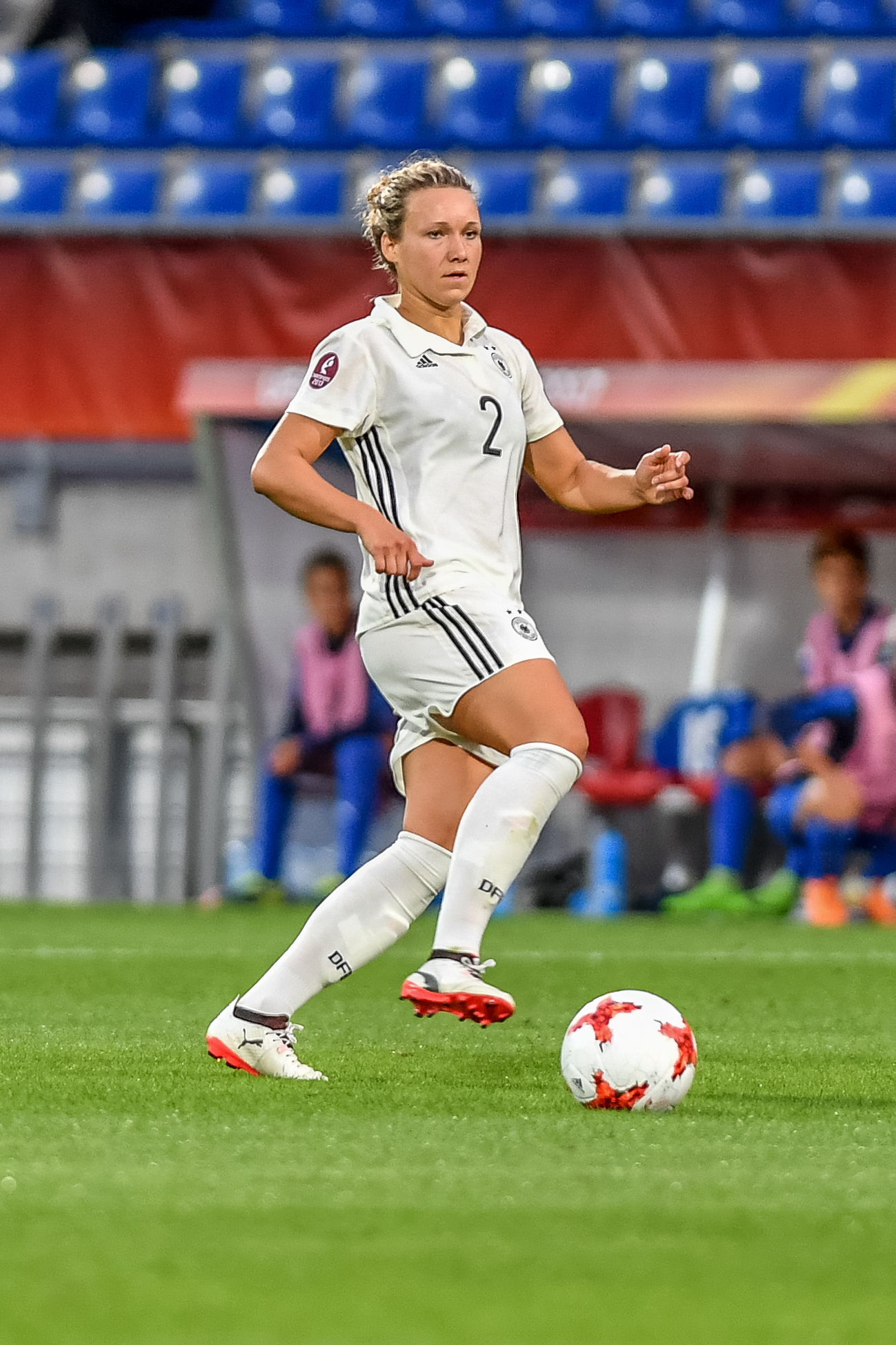
- Josephine Henning during the UEFA Women's Euro 2017 match against Italy

Personal information
- Full name: Josephine Henning
- Date of birth: 8 September 1989 (age 37)
- Place of birth: Trier, West Germany
- Height: 1.75 m (5 ft 9 in)
- Position: Centre back

Youth career
- MSG/FSG Zewen-Igel
- –2005: MSG/FSG Schweich-Issel

Senior career*
Years	Team	Apps	(Gls)
2005–2009	1. FC Saarbrücken	50	(0)
2009–2011	1. FFC Turbine Potsdam	39	(0)
2011–2014	VfL Wolfsburg	49	(0)
2014–2016	Paris Saint-Germain	15	(0)
2016	Arsenal	10	(0)
2017	Olympique Lyonnais	3	(0)
2017–2018	Arsenal	3	(0)
Total		169	(0)

International career
2007–2008	Germany U19	11	(0)
2008–2011	Germany U20	8	(0)
2010–2017	Germany	42	(2)
Medal record
Women's football
Representing Germany
Olympic Games
Gold medal – first place	2016 Rio de Janeiro	Team
UEFA Women's Championship
Gold medal – first place	2013 Sweden	Team
- * Club domestic league appearances and goals

Josephine Henning (born 8 September 1989) is a German former footballer who last played as a centre-back. After making her debut for the Germany national team in September 2010, she won over 25 caps and represented her country at UEFA Women's Euro 2013 and the 2015 FIFA Women's World Cup.

== Club career ==
Henning won the Frauen-Bundesliga four times and the UEFA Women's Champions League four times while playing with Turbine Potsdam and VfL Wolfsburg in her home country. She then signed for French club Paris Saint-Germain in June 2014.

She helped Paris Saint-Germain reach the 2015 UEFA Women's Champions League Final, where they lost 2–1 to Frankfurt. Henning missed the first half of the 2015–16 season through injury then negotiated a termination of her contract in January 2016.

In February 2016, Henning attended a pre-season training camp with Arsenal in Seville, Spain. She was named as a substitute in Arsenal's 3–1 friendly win over Bayern Munich. Her transfer to Arsenal was confirmed by the club on 18 February 2016.

She returned to Arsenal for the 2017–18 season.

On 2 July 2018, Henning announced her retirement.

== International career ==
Henning was part of the squad for the 2016 Summer Olympics, where Germany went on to win the gold medal.

== Podcast ==
Together with her former teammate Anja Mittag she runs the podcast Mittag’s bei Henning.

== Career statistics ==
Scores and results list Germany's goal tally first:

Henning – goals for Germany
#	Date	Location	Opponent	Score	Result	Competition
1.	29 November 2016	Stadion an der Gellertstraße, Chemnitz, Germany	Norway	1–1	1–1	Friendly
2.	21 July 2017	Koning Willem II Stadion, Breda, Netherlands	Italy	1–0	2–1	UEFA Women's Euro 2017

== Honours ==
1. FC Saarbrücken

- DFB-Pokal: runner-up 2007–08

1. FFC Turbine Potsdam

- Bundesliga: 2009–10, 2010–11
- UEFA Women's Champions League: 2009–10
- DFB-Hallenpokal for women: 2010

VfL Wolfsburg

- Bundesliga: 2012–13, 2013–14
- UEFA Women's Champions League: 2012–13, 2013–14
- DFB-Pokal: 2012–13

Paris Saint Germain

- UEFA Women's Champions League: runner-up 2015

Arsenal

- FA Women's Cup: 2015–16

Olympique Lyon

- Division 1 Féminine: 2016–17
- Coupe de France Féminine: 2017
- UEFA Women's Champions League: 2016–17

Germany

- UEFA European Women's Championship: 2013
- Summer Olympic Games: Gold medal, 2016
- Algarve Cup: 2012, 2014
