= 2017 SheBelieves Cup =

Tournament details
- Host country: United States
- Dates: March 1–7
- Teams: 4 (from 2 confederations)
- Venues: 3 (in 3 host cities)

Final positions
- Champions: France (1st title)
- Runners-up: Germany
- Third place: England
- Fourth place: United States

Tournament statistics
- Matches played: 6
- Goals scored: 9 (1.5 per match)
- Attendance: 93,072 (15,512 per match)
- Top scorer(s): (France) Camille Abily (2 goals)

The 2017 SheBelieves Cup was the second edition of the SheBelieves Cup, an invitational women's soccer tournament held in the United States. It took place between March 1 and 7, 2017.

The four teams were ranked No. 1, 2, 3, and 5 in the FIFA Women's World rankings, thus making the tournament the most important friendly Cup of the year. The Algarve Cup ran in parallel as well as the Cyprus Cup. France won the tournament for the first time, winning two and drawing one of their games in the process.

== Teams ==
Team	FIFA Rankings (December 2016)
United States	1
Germany	2
France	3
England	5

== Format ==
The four invited teams played a round-robin tournament.

Points awarded in the group stage followed the standard formula of three points for a win, one point for a draw and zero points for a loss.

== Venues ==
Chester (Philadelphia area)	Harrison (New York City area)	Washington, D.C.
Talen Energy Stadium	Red Bull Arena	Robert F. Kennedy Memorial Stadium
Capacity: 18,500	Capacity: 25,000	Capacity: 45,596
2017 SheBelieves Cup is located in the United States

== Standings ==
Pos	Team	Pld	W	D	L	GF	GA	GD	Pts
1	France (C)	3	2	1	0	5	1	+4	7
2	Germany	3	1	1	1	1	1	0	4
3	England	3	1	0	2	2	3	−1	3
4	United States (H)	3	1	0	2	1	4	−3	3

Source: Flashscore
Rules for classification: 1) points; 2) Goal difference; 3) Goals scored; 4) head-to-head points; 5) head-to-head goal difference; 6) head-to-head number of goals scored; 7) FIFA ranking.
(C) Champions; (H) Hosts

== Results ==
All times are local (UTC−5).

March 1, 2017
16:00

England	1–2	France
Nobbs 32'	Report	Delie 80'; Renard 90+5'

Talen Energy Stadium, Chester, Pennsylvania
Attendance: 8,616
Referee: Melissa Borjas (Honduras)
March 1, 2017
19:00

United States	1–0	Germany
Williams 56'	Report

Talen Energy Stadium, Chester, Pennsylvania
Attendance: 16,318
Referee: Carol Chenard (Canada)

March 4, 2017
14:15

France	0–0	Germany
	Report

Red Bull Arena, Harrison, New Jersey
Attendance: 10,000
Referee: Karen Abt (United States)
March 4, 2017
17:00

United States	0–1	England
	Report	White 89'

Red Bull Arena, Harrison, New Jersey
Attendance: 26,500
Referee: Quetzalli Alvarado (Mexico)

March 7, 2017
16:00

Germany	1–0	England
Mittag 44'	Report

Robert F. Kennedy Memorial Stadium, Washington, D.C.
Attendance: 10,000
Referee: Michelle Pye (Canada)
March 7, 2017
19:00

United States	0–3	France
	Report	Abily 8' (pen.), 63'; Le Sommer 10'

Robert F. Kennedy Memorial Stadium, Washington, D.C.
Attendance: 21,638
Referee: Marie-Soleil Beaudoin (Canada)

== Final standings ==
Rank	Team
1st place, gold medalist(s)	France
2nd place, silver medalist(s)	Germany
3rd place, bronze medalist(s)	England
4	United States

== Goalscorers ==
2 goals

- (France) Camille Abily

1 goal

- (England) Jordan Nobbs
- (England) Ellen White
- (France) Marie-Laure Delie
- (France) Eugénie Le Sommer
- (France) Wendie Renard
- (Germany) Anja Mittag
- (United States) Lynn Williams
