= Abu Bakr (name) =

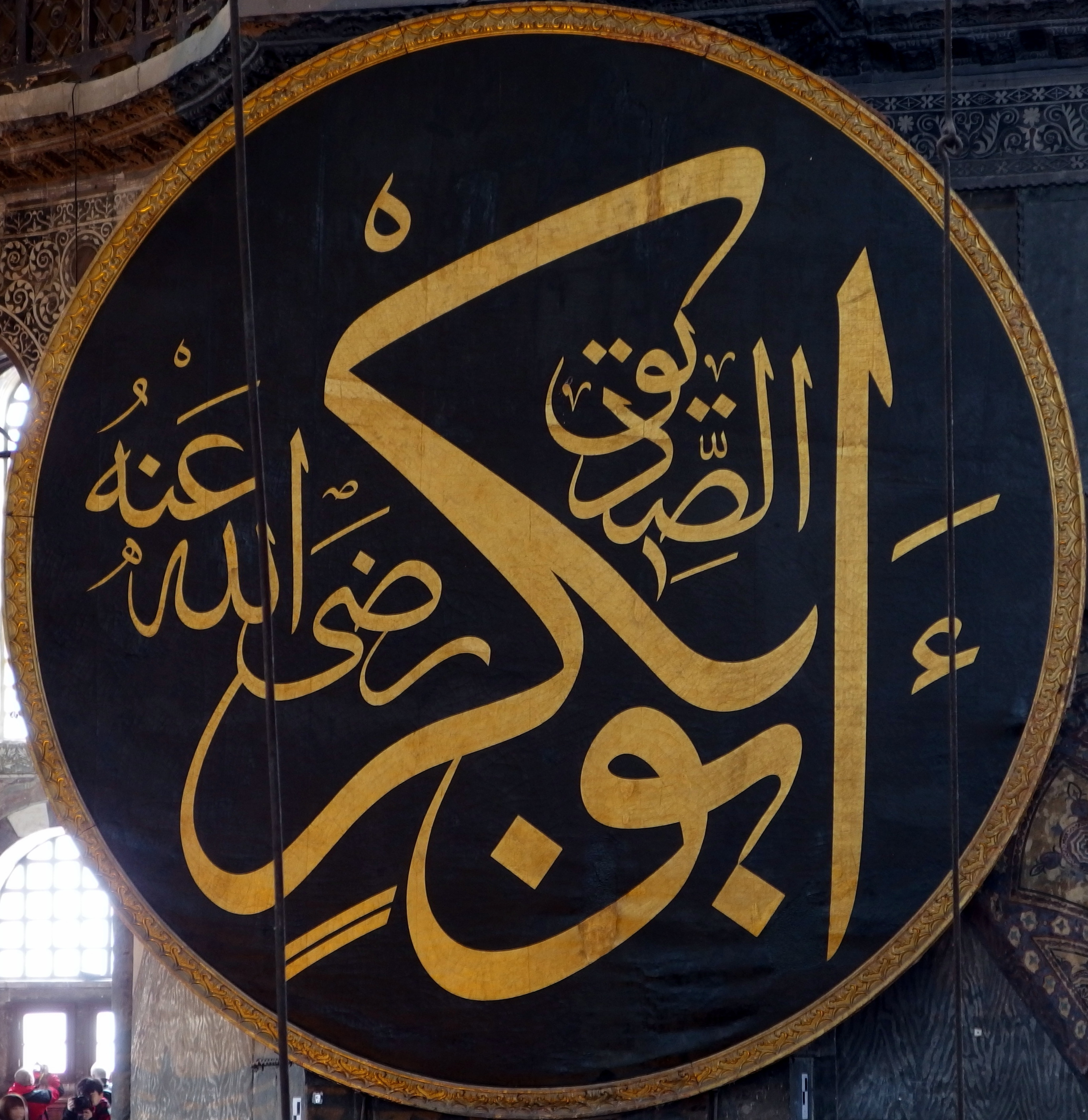
- Calligraphic seal featuring Abu Bakr's name, on display in the Hagia Sophia
- Gender: Male

Origin
- Word/name: Semitic (Arabic)
- Meaning: "Father of a Young Camel"

Abū Bakr (Arabic: أبو بكر) is an Arabic given name meaning "Father of a Young Camel" (Abu meaning 'Father of' and Bakr meaning 'Young Camel') that is widely used by Sunni Muslims.

Other transliterations include Abu Bakar, Abu Bekr, Ebubekir, Aboubacar, Abubakar, etc. The two parts of the name can be written together, hyphenated, or separately.

The most famous person to carry this name was Abu Bakr al-Siddiq (c. 573–634), one of the companions of the Islamic prophet Muhammad and the first caliph of Islam. He was also Muhammad's father-in-law through Aisha. His real name was Abdullah, Abu Bakr being his kunya.

== Early and medieval Islam ==
- Abu Bakr al-Siddiq (573–634)
- Abu Bakr ibn Ali (650–680)
- Abu Bakr ibn Hasan ibn Ali (died 680)
- Abu Bakr ibn Muhammad ibn Hazm (died 737), Sunni Islamic scholar based in Madinah, Saudi Arabia
- Abu Bakr ibn Abd al-Malik (died 750), an Umayyad prince
- Abu Bakr al-Isfahani (died 908), Persian scholar in Warsh recitation
- Abu Bakr al-Khallal (died 923), Muslim jurist
- Abu Bakr Muhammad ibn Zakariyya' al-Razi (865–925), Persian physician, alchemist, and philosopher
- Abu Bakr Ibn Mujāhid (860–936), Iraqi Islamic scholar
- Abu Bakr Muhammad (died 941), Muhtajid ruler of Chaghaniyan and governor of Samanid Khurasan
- Abu Bakr al-Shibli (861–946), Sufi of Persian descent, disciple of Junayd Baghdadi
- Abu Bakr bin Yahya al-Suli (880–946), Arab shatranj player
- Abu Bakr Ibn Al-Qutia (died 997), historian and author born in Córdoba, Spain
- Abu Bakr Ahmed ibn 'Ali ibn Qays al-Wahshiyah, or Ibn Wahshiyya (died 930), Iraqi alchemist, agriculturalist, farm toxicologist, egyptologist and historian
- Abu Bakr al-Alami al-Idrissi (died 10th-century), ancestor of the Alami Sayyids of Morocco and leader of the Beni Arrous tribe
- Abu Bakr al-Kalabadhi (late 10th Century), Bukhara Sufi, author of the Kitab at-ta'arruf
- Abu Bakr Muḥammad ibn al-Ṭayyib al-Baqillani (930–1013), Iraqi Islamic scholar, theologian and logician
- Abu Bakr Muhammad ibn al-Hasan ibn Furak (941–1015) Muslim Imam, specialist of Arabic language, grammar and poetry, an orator, a jurist, and a hadith scholar from the Shafi'i Madhab
- Abu Bakr Abd al-Karīm ibn al-Faḍl al-Muti better known by his regnal name At-Ta'i (932–1003), was the caliph of Baghdad from 974 to 991.
- Abul-Mahāsin Abu Bakr Zaynuddin Azraqi (died 1072), Persian poet
- Abu Bakr ibn Umar (died 1087), Almoravid ruler
- Abu Bakr al-Turtushi (1059–1127), Muslim jurist and political theorist from Tortosa, Spain
- Abu Bakr ibn al-Arabi (1076–1148), judge and scholar of Maliki law from al-Andalus
- Abu Bakr Abd al-Malik ibn Quzman (1078–1160) poet in al-Andalus
- Abû Bakr Muḥammad Ibn Yaḥyà ibn aṣ-Ṣâ’igh at-Tûjîbî Ibn Bâjja al-Tujibi, known as Avempace, (1085–1138), Andalusian polymath: whose writings cover astronomy, physics, psychology, music, etc.
- Abu Bakr Muhammad ibn Abd al-Malik ibn Muhammad ibn Tufail al-Qaisi al-Andalusi; (1105–1185), Andalusian Arab physician and philosopher
- Abu Bakr al-Hassar or Abu Bakr ibn Muhammad ibn Ayyash al Hassar (12th century), Muslim mathematician from Morocco
- al-Adil Sayf al-Din Abu-Bakr ibn Ayyub or Al-Adil I (1145–1218), Ayyubid-Egyptian general, brother of Saladin
- Abu Bakr Ibn Sayyid al-Nās (1200–1261), Almohad theologian.
- Saif ad-Dīn al-Malik al-ʿĀdil Abū Bakr b. Nāṣir ad-Dīn Muḥammad or Al-Adil II (1221?–1248), Ayyubid sultan of Egypt
- Abubakr Sa'd ibn Zangy (1231–1260), ruler of Shiraz
- Abu Bakr (mid 13th century), brother and companion of Sunjata, founder of the Mali Empire
- Abu Bakr (late 13th century), mansa of the Mali Empire
- Saif ad-Din Abu-Bakr (1321–1341), Mamluk sultan of Egypt
- Abu Bakr ibn Faris (died 1359), Marinid Sultan
- Abu Bakr Shah (died 1390), ruler of the Tughlaq dynasty
- Aboobakuru I of the Maldives (died 1443?), sultan of Maldives during 1443
- Abu Bakr al-Aydarus (1447–1508), Hadhrami religious scholar of Sufism and poet
- Mirza Abu Bakr Dughlat (died after 1514), ruler in eastern Central Asia, an emir of the Dughlat tribe
- Abu Bakr ibn Muhammad (died 1526), sultan of Adal Sultanate
- Abu Bakr Qecchin, governor of Adal Sultanate
- Abu Bakr Mirza (died 1602), self-declared Shah of Shirvan after the downfall of Kavus Mirza

== 18th century to present ==
- Abu Bakr al-Siddiq (enslaved man from Timbuktu), Islamic scholar
- Abu Bakr Atiku (1782–1842), sultan of the Sokoto Caliphate or Fulani Empire
- Abu Bakr II ibn ʽAbd al-Munan (died 1852), emir of Harar
- Abu Bakr Effendi (1814–1880), Ottoman qadi of Kurdish descent in the Cape of Good Hope from 1862 to 1880
- Abu Bakar of Johor (1833–1895), Sultan of Johor
- Mulla Abu Bakr Effendi, or just Mulla Effendi (1863–1942), Kurdish Muslim cleric, Islamic philosopher, scholar, astronomer and politician
- Abu Bakar bin Taha (1882–1956), Yemen-born Islamic educator in Singapore
- Abu Bakr Ahmad Haleem (1897–1975), Pakistani political scientist and first vice-chancellor of Karachi University
- Abu Bakar Jambol (1897–1976), Bruneian civil servant and community leader
- Abu Bakar of Pahang (1904–1974), Sultan of Pahang
- Pengiran Abu Bakar Umar (1906–1985), Bruneian legislative speaker
- Pengiran Abu Bakar Salleh (1907–1974), Bruneian legislative speaker
- Abū Bakr Sirāj ad-Dīn or Martin Lings (1909–2005), English Islamic scholar
- Abu Bakr Khairat (1910–1963), Egyptian composer of classical music
- Abubakar Tafawa Balewa (1912–1966), first prime minister of independent Nigeria
- Aboubakar Sangoulé Lamizana (1916–2005), second President of Upper Volta (now Burkina Faso)
- Roqia Abubakr (1917-after 1973), one of the first four women elected to parliament in Afghanistan
- Aboubakar Abdel Rahmane (died 1979), Chadian warlord
- Abubakar Olusola Saraki (1933–2012), Nigerian politician
- Abdullahi Abubakar (1936–2026), Nigerian Islamic cleric and humanitarian
- Abu Bakar Ba'asyir (born 1938), Indonesian Muslim cleric
- Aboubakar Diaby Ouattara (born 1938), diplomat from Côte d'Ivoire
- Datti Abubakar (1939–2005), Military Governor of Anambra State in Nigeria
- Haidar Abu Bakr al-Attas (born 1939), Yemeni politician and sometime Prime Minister
- Sheikh Abubakr Ahmad (born 1939), leader of one of the traditionalist Sunni (Sufi) Muslims (shafi) in Kerala, India
- Abubakar Rimi (1940–2010), Nigerian politician
- Abu Bakr Baira (born 1941), Libyan politician, Acting President of the Council of Deputies of Libya
- Yasin Abu Bakr (1941–2021), leader of the Jamaat al Muslimeen, a Muslim group in Trinidad and Tobago.
- Abu Bakr al-Qirbi (born 1942), Yemeni politician
- Abdulsalami Abubakar (born 1942), Nigerian general and politician
- Abu Baker Asvat (1943–1989), murdered South African activist and medical doctor
- Aboubacar Somparé (1944–2017), Guinean politician, President of the National Assembly
- Abu Bakar Abdul Jamal (born 1946), admiral in the Malaysian Navy
- Atef Abu Bakr (born 1946), Palestinian politician and PLO member
- Atiku Abubakar (born 1946), Nigerian politician
- Boubaker Ayadi (born 1949), Tunisian author
- Mustafa Abubakar (born 1949), Indonesian politician
- Abu-Bakr Yunis Jabr (1952–2011), Libyan Minister of Defence under Gaddafi
- Abu Bakar (1952–2019), Indonesian regent of West Bandung
- Sa'adu Abubakar (born 1956), Sultan of Sokoto in northern Nigeria
- Abu Bakr, name used by Australian militant activist Abdul Nacer Benbrika (born 1960)
- Aboubacar Ibrahim Abani (born 1962), Nigerian diplomat
- Abubakar Bukola Saraki (born 1962), Nigerian politician
- Mohammed Badaru Abubakar (born 1962), Nigerian politician
- Aboe Bakar Al-Habsyi (born 1964), Indonesian politician
- Aboubakr Jamaï (born 1968), Moroccan journalist and banker
- Abu Bakker Qassim (born 1969), Uyghur who was held in Guantanamo Bay
- Abu Bakr al-Baghdadi (1971–2019) as Ibrahim Awad Ibrahim al-Badri, leader of the Islamic State of Iraq and the Levant (ISIL) militant group and self-proclaimed caliph
- Aboubacar Doumbia (born 1974), also known as Abou Nidal, Ivorian singer
- Aboubakar Soumahoro (born 1980), Italian-Ivorian trade unionist, labor activist and politician
- Abu Bakr Mansha (born 1983/1984), convicted under the British Terrorism Act 2000
- Abu Bakar (Dubrovka attack) or Abubakar, pseudonym of Khanpasha Terkibayev, perpetrator of the 2002 Dubrovka attack
- Abu-Bakr al-Mansouri, Libyan politician, secretary for Agriculture, Animal Wealth and Marine Resources
- Abubakar Salim (born 1993), British actor and video game voice actor
- Abu Bakr Shawky (born 1985), Egyptian-Austrian writer and director
- Abubakar Tabuni (born 1995/1996), Indonesian Papuan separatist militant
- Aboubakar Moukadas Nouré (born 1958), Central African academician, sociologist, writer, and politician
- Md. Abu Bakar, Bangladeshi politician

=== Sportspeople ===
- Abu Bakr Ratib (1896-??), Egyptian fencer
- Abubakar Al-Mass (born 1955), Yemeni footballer
- Aboubakar Camara (born 1965), former rugby union footballer and current coach from Côte d'Ivoire
- Aboubacar Cissé (born 1969), Ivorian footballer
- Aboubacar Titi Camara, (born 1972), Guinean footballer
- Aboubacar Mario Bangoura (born 1977), Guinean football referee
- Abubaker Tabula (born 1980), Ugandan footballer
- Aboubacar Guindo (born 1981), Malian footballer
- Abubakari Yakubu (born 1981), Ghanaian footballer
- Abubakr Al Abaidy (born 1981), Libyan footballer
- Aboubacar Bangoura (born 1982), Guinean international footballer
- Aboubakar Koné (born 1982), footballer from Côte d'Ivoire
- Abubakari Yahuza (born 1983), Ghanaian footballer
- Aboubacar Tandia (born 1983), French footballer
- Aboubacar Sylla (born 1983), Guinean footballer
- Abubaker Ali Kamal (born 1983), Qatari runner who has specialized in the 1500 metres and 3000 metres steeplechase
- Aboubacar M'Baye Camara (born 1985), Guinean footballer
- Radanfah Abu Bakr (born 1987), Trinidadian footballer
- Abubakar Bello-Osagie (born 1988), Nigerian footballer
- Mé Aboubacar Diomandé (born 1988), Ivorian footballer
- Aboubacar Camara (born 1988), Guinean footballer
- Abubaker Kaki Khamis (1989–2025), Sudanese Olympic middle-distance runner
- Mohd Faizal Abu Bakar (born 1990), Malaysian footballer
- Abou Bakr Al-Mel (born 1992), Lebanese footballer
- Vincent Aboubakar (born 1992), Cameroonian international footballer
- Lalas Abubakar (born 1994), Ghanaian footballer
- Aboubacar Doumbia (born 1995), Malian footballer
- Aboubacar Doumbia (born 1999), Ivorian footballer
- Aboubacar Keita (born 2000), American footballer
- Umar Abubakar (born 2006), Nigerian footballer

== Other uses ==
- Hazrati Abu Bakr Siddique, mosque in Flushing, Queens, New York
- Abu Bakar Royal Mosque, Pahang, Malaysia
- Saidina Abu Bakar As Siddiq Mosque, Kuala Lumpur, Malaysia
- Sultan Abu Bakar State Mosque, Johor, Malaysia
- Sultan Abu Bakar Complex, customs, immigration and quarantine complex, Malaysia
- Abubakar Tafawa Balewa University, Bauchi, Nigeria
- BNS Abu Bakr (1982), Bangladeshi warship
- BNS Abu Bakr (2014), Bangladeshi warship

== See also ==
- Boubacar, West African version of the same name
