= Tandia (disambiguation) =

Tandia is a novel. Tandia may also refer to:

== People ==
- Aboubacar Tandia (born 1983), French footballer
- Ibrahima Tandia (born 1993), French footballer
- Siga Tandia (born 1987), French footballer
- Souleymane Tandia (born 1987), Senegalese footballer

== Other uses ==
- Tandia language, language
