= Siga (disambiguation) =

Siga was a port city of the ancient kingdom of Numidia.

Siga may also refer to:

- Shiga Prefecture, Japan
- Tapen Siga, a BJP politician in Arunachal Pradesh, India
- Siga Tandia, a French footballer
- Siga (moth), a genus of moths
- SIGA Technologies, a pharmaceutical company
- Peste & Sida and Despe e Siga, Portuguese musical groups
- The Estonian word for pig
