= Agriculture in Libya =

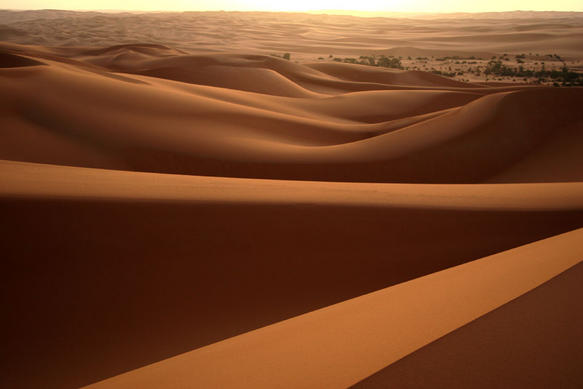
Desert landscape in Libya; 90% of the country is desert

Although agriculture is the second-largest sector in the economy, Libya depends on imports in most foods. Climatic conditions and poor soils limit farm output, and domestic food production meets about 25% of demand. Domestic conditions limit output, while income and population growth have increased food consumption. Because of low rainfall, agricultural projects like the Kufra Oasis rely on underground water sources. Libya's primary agricultural water source remains the Great Man-made River (GMMR), but significant resources are being invested in desalinization research to meet growing demand. Libyan agricultural projects and policies are overseen by a General Inspector; there is no Ministry of Agriculture, per se.

== History of agricultural development ==
Historically, Libyan agriculture has had an inverse relationship to growth in the oil industry. In 1958, agriculture supplied over 26% of GDP. Although gross agricultural production was relatively constant, increasing oil revenues resulted in declines in agriculture's share of national income. Agriculture contributed 9% of GDP in 1962, 2% in 1978, 3.5% in 1984 and 5.6% by 1997. In 1977 imported food valuations were over 37 times higher than in 1958. However, while a large part of oil wealth was spent on imported food this was not necessarily disturbing. The 1950s agricultural sector masked high poverty, low productivity and limited alternatives. Petrodollars provided urban employment, resulting in higher rural migration. In 1961-63, government loans to buy land from Italian settlers, encouraged them to purchase land for recreation rather than farming, thereby inflating values and reducing production.

=== Libyan Soils ===
Soils characteristics in Libya are affected to the great extent by nature and conditions in which these soils were formed. Generally, aridity is the main characterizes of such soils. Most of these soils are undeveloped or partially developed. According to the United States soil classification, Aridisols and Entisols are the major soil orders in the country. Salt affected soils are spread in the coastal area as Salic Haplocambids, Typic Aquisalids, Typic Haplosalids, Typic Haplocalcids, Lithic Haplocalcids, and Typical Torriorthents.

=== Agriculture since 1962 ===
Since 1962 agriculture has received more attention. The government bag began providing inducements for absentee landlords to encourage productive land use and initiated agricultural wage policies. Agricultural was the cornerstone of the 1981-85 development plan, attaching high priority to funding the GMMR project, designed to bring water from aquifers in Sarir and Kufra. In 1981, the National Libyan Agricultural Bank provided agricultural credit totaling almost 10,000 loans averaging nearly LD1,500 each. This may explain why many Libyans (nearly 20% of the labor force in 1984) remained in the agricultural sector. By 1997, about 17% of the labor force worked in agriculture.

In 1984, Libya imported over 2 million mt of cereals (up from 612,000 mt in 1974). Also in 1984, the average index of food production per capita indicated a 6% decline from 1974 to 1976. Through the 1980s about 70% of Libya's food needs were imported. By 1998, cereal production was 207,000 mt and met only 15% of the country's needs.

== Production ==
Libya produced in 2018:

- 348 thousand tons of potato;
- 236 thousand tons of watermelon;
- 215 thousand tons of tomato;
- 188 thousand tons of olive;
- 183 thousand tons of onion;
- 176 thousand tons of date;
- 138 thousand tons of wheat;
- 93 thousand tons of barley;
- 72 thousand tons of vegetable;
- 60 thousand tons of plum;
- 53 thousand tons of orange;

In addition to smaller productions of other agricultural products.

== Land use and irrigation ==
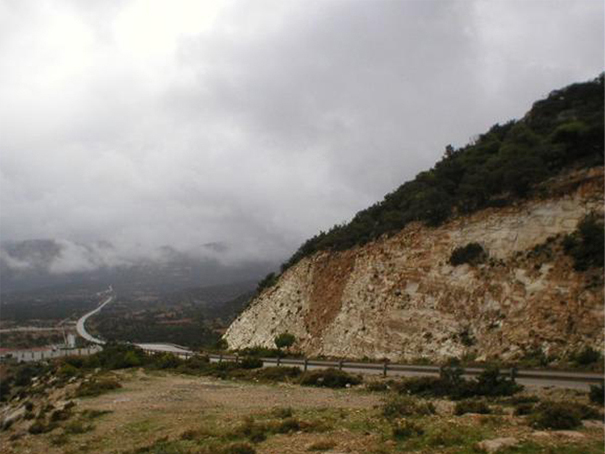
View from Jebel Akhdar in Libya near Benghazi is Libya's wettest region. Annual rainfall averages at between 400 and 600 millimeters.

The total area of Libya is estimated at 1,760,000 km^{2}. Area suitable for cultivation approximates 22,000 km^{2} of which 2,390 km^{2} dedicated to irrigated agriculture, 15,500 km^{2} to rain fed farming, and 140,000 km^{2} of forest and range lands. Under 2% of the land is arable and about 4% is suitable for grazing livestock. Most arable land is in the Jebel Akhdar region near Benghazi, and the Jifara Plain near Tripoli. The highest parts of Jebel Akhdar receive 400-600 mm of rain annually, and the adjacent area, north to Marj Plain, receives 200–400 mm. Central and eastern Jifara Plain and Jabal Nafusa average 200 to 400 mm. The remaining coast and southern areas average 100–200 mm. Jifara Plain has an underground aquifer, enabling well-driven irrigation. Between these areas is a 50 km land strip with enough scrub vegetation to support livestock. Desert dominates the south with occasional oasis cultivation at Kufra, Sabha and Murzuk.

Studies from the 1970s indicated that at any given time, about one-third of total arable land remained fallow and up to 45% of farms were under 10 ha. Most farms in the Jifara Plain were irrigated by individual wells and electric pumps, although in 1985 only about 1% of arable land was irrigated.

Since 1969, the Gaddafi government has been very concerned with land reform. After the "al-Fatah" revolution, confiscated Italian-owned farms (about 380 km^{2}) were redistributed. The state retained some confiscated lands for state farming ventures, but overall, the government has not sought to eliminate the private sector from agriculture. In 1971, uncultivated land was declared state property. This measure targeted tribes in the Jebel Akhdar claiming large land tracts. Another law in 1977 further restricted tribal groups, emphasizing use in determining land ownership. Since 1977 families receive enough land to satisfy their personal requirements; this policy was designed to prevent large private sector farms and end using fertile "tribal" lands for grazing. Partly as a result of these policies and Islamic inheritance law, which stipulate each son receive an equal share of land upon the father's death, in 1986 farms tended to be fragmented and too small to efficiently use water. This was especially severe in the Jifara Plain, which has been Libya's single most productive agricultural region.

Falling water tables caused by over irrigation posed a long-term ecological threat. The government recognized this in 1976, and took measures discouraging citrus and tomato cultivation, which require large water amounts. However, the steps required to save coastal water resources – i.e., irrigation regulation and land tenure reform to make it more water-efficient - conflicted with Gaddafi's concept of economic equity, which favored intensive irrigated cultivation of small plots for family use. Thus, instead of reforming harmful practices, agricultural policy since 1983 focused on pumping water to the coast from fossil reserves in the desert as part of the GMMR project.

=== Libyan Soils ===
Soils and their characteristics in Libya are affected to the great extent by nature and conditions in which these soils were formed. Generally, aridity is the main characterizes of such soils. Most of these soils are undeveloped or partially developed. According to the United States soil classification, Aridisols and Entisols are the major soil orders in the country. Salt affected soils are spread in the coastal area as Salic Haplocambids, Typic Aquisalids, Typic Haplosalids, Typic Haplocalcids, Lithic Haplocalcids, and Typical Torriorthents.

== Fishing ==
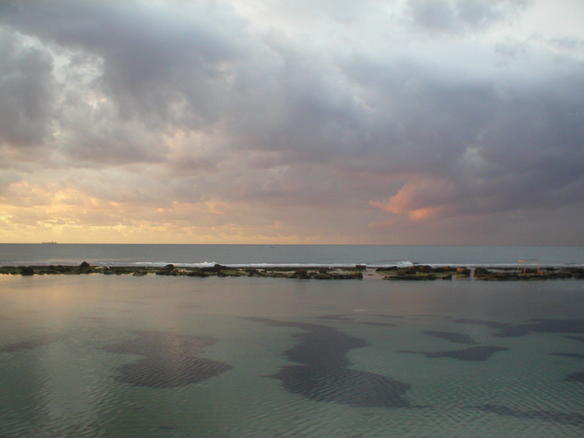
Coastline of Benghazi, Libya's second largest city. With the longest Mediterranean coastline among African nations, Libya's mostly unspoilt beaches are a social gathering place.

Although Libya has nearly 1,800 km of coastline and the second largest continental shelf in the Mediterranean, its waters are not particularly rich in plankton needed to sustain fishing waters. In 1977, Libya's fishing catch was 4,803 tons and 6,418 tons by 1981. Most fleets were located on the western coast near Tripoli. In 1979, fishing boats were estimated at 325, 13 being commercial trawlers; the rest small and medium-sized boats. There were approximately 1,000-1,200 professional fishermen by 1981. The government has encouraged fishing and attempted to stimulate demand. In 1986 a fishing port was constructed at Zuwara, and ice plants were built at several coastal sites. Agreements for joint fishing development were signed with several countries, including Tunisia and Spain.

Sponge fishing was monopolized by Greek fishers. A tiny percentage of the harvest was obtained by Libyans using small boats and skin-diving equipment from shallow waters inshore. In 1977, the government established freshwater fish farms in several inshore locations. In 1997, the low annual catch of 34,500 mt demonstrates Libya’s still underdeveloped fisheries. Low investments in fishing boats, ports, and processing facilities are major obstacles to growth. The country has one major fishing port (Zliten), one tuna plant and two sardine factories with small processing capacities (1,000 metric tons per year each). Libya is planning to build 24 fishing ports in addition to one under construction at Marsa Zuaga. With a primary and secondary productive employment base of around 12,000 persons by 2006, the national fisheries sector provides a small fraction - around 1% - of the total labor force. Its estimated contribution to Agricultural GDP is negligible, standing at around 10%.

== Forestry ==
Libya lacks forests for commercial purposes. Although the government designated over 624 km^{2} as woodland or forest, this land is covered in scrub and minor vegetation. During the 1960s the government began an afforestation program. An estimated 213 million seedlings were planted by 1977, 33 million being fruit trees. Most reforestation occurred in western Libya. During reforestation, scientists experimented with a petrochemical spray that is sufficiently porous to allow rain to seep through, yet sturdy enough to prevent seedlings from being blown away during sandstorms. Planting program goals included growing enough trees to meet domestic lumber needs, soil conservation and reclamation, and windbreaks for crops and settlements.

== Statistics ==
- Area:
  - total: 1,759,540 km².
  - land: 1,759,540 km².
  - water: 0 km²
- Coastline: 1,770 km.
- Maritime claims:
  - territorial sea: 12 nm
  - note: Gulf of Sidra closing line - 32 degrees, 30 minutes north
  - exclusive fishing zone: 62 nautical miles (115 km)
- Climate: Mediterranean along coast; dry, extreme desert interior.
- Elevation extremes:
  - lowest point: Sabkhat Ghuzayyil -47 m
  - highest point: Bikku Bitti 2,266 m
- Land use:
  - arable land: 1.03%.
  - permanent crops: 0.19%.
  - other: 98.78% (2005).
- Irrigated land: 4,700 km² (2003).
- Geography: more than 90% of the country is desert or semidesert.
- Agriculture - products: wheat, barley, olives, dates, citrus, vegetables, peanuts, soybeans; cattle.

== See also ==
- Abu-Bakr al-Mansouri
