= CIFF =

CIFF may refer to:

== Film festivals ==
- Cairo International Film Festival, Egypt
- Calgary International Film Festival, Canada
- Cambodia International Film Festival
- Canberra International Film Festival, Australia
- Chennai International Film Festival, India
- Chicago International Film Festival, United States
- Cinekambiya International Film Festival, The Gambia
- Cleveland International Film Festival, United States
- Copenhagen International Film Festival, Denmark (2003-2008)
- Cork International Film Festival, Ireland

== Other uses ==
- Camera Image File Format
- The Children's Investment Fund Foundation, a UK charity
- CIFF-FM, a Canadian radio station
