= Gambia Film Unit =

Gambian government agency from 1967 to 1995

Agency overview
- Formed: 1967
- Dissolved: 1995
- Superseding agencies: Gam TV; GRTS
- Agency executive: Ebrima Sagnia, Director
- Parent department: Department of Agriculture (1967–1969); Department of Information (1969–1995)

Gambia Film Unit was an agency of the Gambian government that produced short films and showed them in remote parts of The Gambia. It was founded in 1967 by Anthony Latham, a UK Filmmaker, first at the Department of Agriculture at Yundum, then in 1968 at the government's Information Office in Bathurst, as it was then. Ebrima Sanyang took over from 1972, and Tony left at the end of 1973. By the time Tony left, it had become a highly productive unit with up-to-date equipment, with two filmmobiles showing films for 23-nights every month in villages on both banks of the river Gambia. From the first film that Tony made when only 1% of the population had seen a moving picture, to seven-years later, when the census office recorded close to 100%. It was merged into Gam TV, a predecessor to the Gambia Radio & Television Service (GRTS), in 1995.

== History ==
The Gambia Film Unit was founded in 1967 by ANTHONY LATHAM, who after seven-years working as a Sound Recordist on the BBC news programme Midlands Today, accepted a job as a VSO (Voluntary Service Overseas) to make films in The Gambia. With a donated Filmmobile from British Films Ltd, 10 cans of 100 ft colour film, and a Bell and Howell DR70 camera, Tony made his first film called 'Seed Next Season' in five languages. His second film in 1967 was called 'Two Years of Progress'. This so impressed the government and others, that Tony was offered a three-year contract to continue funded by the British government - ODA as it was then. Following that contract, Tony was offered a three-year UNESCO contract to continue. In total, Tony made 19-films in up to five local languages each. During this time, Ebrima Sanyang was employed, and Tony successfully enrolled him in a UK film school for three-years. Sanyang took over officially in 1972 on return from the UK, and Tony stayed on as his mentor until the end of 1973. At the time of writing, 2025, Tony is still alive at 84, and still making films. It was in 1966 that a cinema projection unit was donated to the Department of Agriculture. Originally destined for Nigeria, it was off-loaded in The Gambia due to the Biafran war by Oxfam, who donated a camera and projection equipment, LWB Land Rover with a built-in power generator. The unit produced short films on various topics that it then showed to people in villages. One film, 'Two Years of Progress', highlighted the government's achievements in the two years following independence. In 1969, the unit was transferred to the control of the Department of Information. Following this transfer, it began producing films on topics such as health, nutrition, the 1973 census, and the 1978 state visit of the President of Nigeria.

In 1969, Ebrima Sanyang was sent on a production course at the London Film School, returning in 1972 to head the unit. The unit acted in the place of a television service in remote parts of The Gambia. Early production was limited by a lack of a professional sound camera, editing equipment, and the lack of trained Gambians in this field. Due to these conditions, the government requested assistance from the UNESCO for the expansion of the unit. Anthony Latham, was the original founder of The Gambia Film Unit, and after four-years, was given a three-year contract to continue by UNESCO. This came with a huge cheque, which Tony used to purchase an Arriflex BL-16 camera, a LWB second Filmmobile Landrover, and professional editing equipment. Tony also managed to get additional UNESCO funding to send Ebrima Sanyang to the UK for three-years, and the Filmmobile Operator Yaya Ceesay on a nine-month attachment to British Films. In 1975, a black and white film laboratory and the training of technicians were also provided for. In 1981, the unit was able to capture footage of the coup d'etat attempt that was used by news media across the world.

The unit held an important role in Gambian media, alongside Radio Gambia and the Gambia News Bulletin. The unit became part of Gam TV, The Gambia's first TV station, which was short-lived before it became itself part of Gambia Radio & Television Service (GRTS) in 1995. Sanyang and others involved in the unit have since been described as "pioneers" of Gambian film by Gambian filmmaker Prince Bubacarr Aminata Sankanu.
