= Bubacarr =

Bubacar or Bubacarr is a masculine given name. It is related to Boubacar.

== People ==
- Bubacarr Bah, Gambian mathematician
- Bubacar Djaló (born 1997), Guinea-Bissau-born Portuguese footballer
- Bubacarr Jobe (born 1994), Gambian footballer
- Bubacar Njie Kambi (born 1998), known as Bacari, Gambian footballer
- Bubacarr Marong (born 2000), Gambian footballer
- Bubacarr Sanneh (born 1994), Gambian footballer
- Bubacarr Trawally (born 1994), Gambian footballer

== See also ==
- Hassan Bubacar Jallow (born 1951), Gambian judge
- Prince Bubacarr Aminata Sankanu, Gambian filmmaker
