= Bangsar Park =

Coordinates: 3.1327°N 101.6721°E

Bangsar Park was the first residential area to be developed within the area which is now known as Bangsar in Kuala Lumpur, Malaysia. It is a much sought-after residential and commercial address in the Klang Valley.

Bangsar shown within the Federal Territory of Kuala Lumpur

It lies about four kilometres southwest of the city centre and is a ten minutes drive by car from the city centre. It is given the postcode of 59000.

The Dewan Bandaraya Kuala Lumpur is the local governing authority. It is represented by the Bangsar Park Residents' Association. Bangsar Park is also part of the Lembah Pantai constituency and its Member of Parliament is Fahmi Fadzil, for the past 1 term.

== History ==
Bangsar was initially a rubber estate. One suggestion is that it derives its name from Bunge, a Belgian, and Grisar, a Frenchman, said to be the founders of a European company that ran the estate, Bunge-Grisar. The name of this estate was soon localised to Bangsar, and finally Bangsar. It was the nearest to Kuala Lumpur.

It was later developed into a residential area. Bangsar Park was the first area to be developed. Apparently it was the first planned housing estates in Kuala Lumpur. The first houses were built in 1969. Development in Bangsar started once Socfin estates sold the land to private developers.

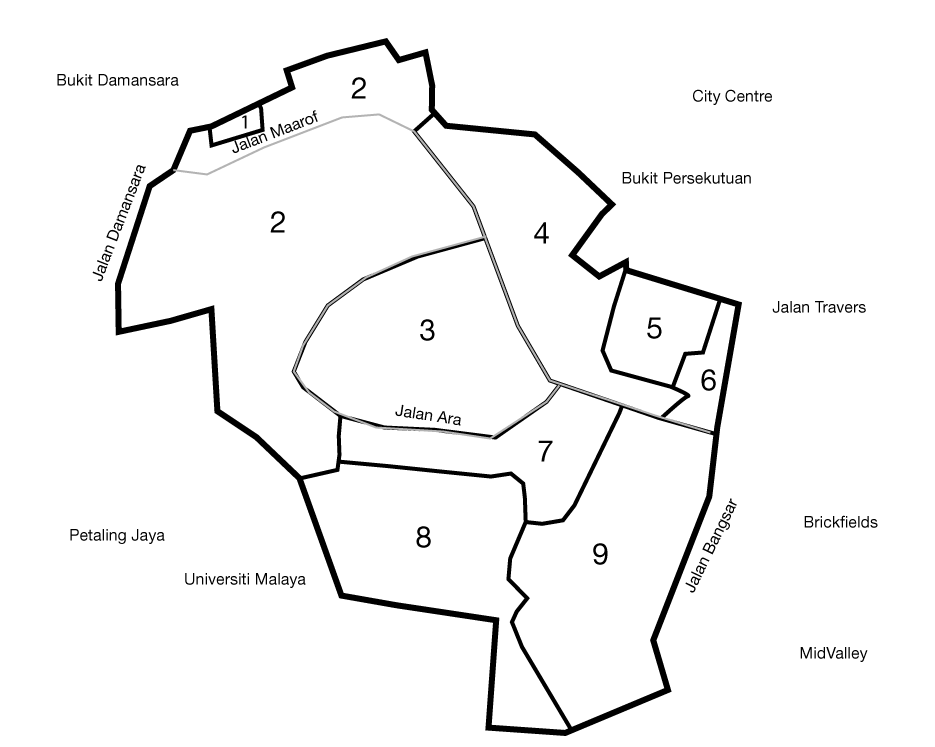
1. Taman SA; 2. Bukit Bandaraya; 3. Bangsar Baru; 4. Bangsar Park; 5. Bukit Bangsar; 6. Bangsar Utama; 7. Lucky Garden; 8. Pantai Hills; 9. Off Jalan Bangsar

== Geography ==
Though generally Bangsar is a hilly suburb, Bangsar Park lies in the southern part of the area which of flat terrain.

Jalan Maarof (Ma'arof) is Bangsar's main thoroughfare. It also divides Bangsar into two main parts. On the east of this road lies Taman SA, Bangsar Park, Bukit Bangsar, Bangsar Utama and one-half of Bukit Bandaraya (postcode 59000). The other neighbourhoods (and other half of Bukit Bandaraya) lie on the west (postcode 59100).

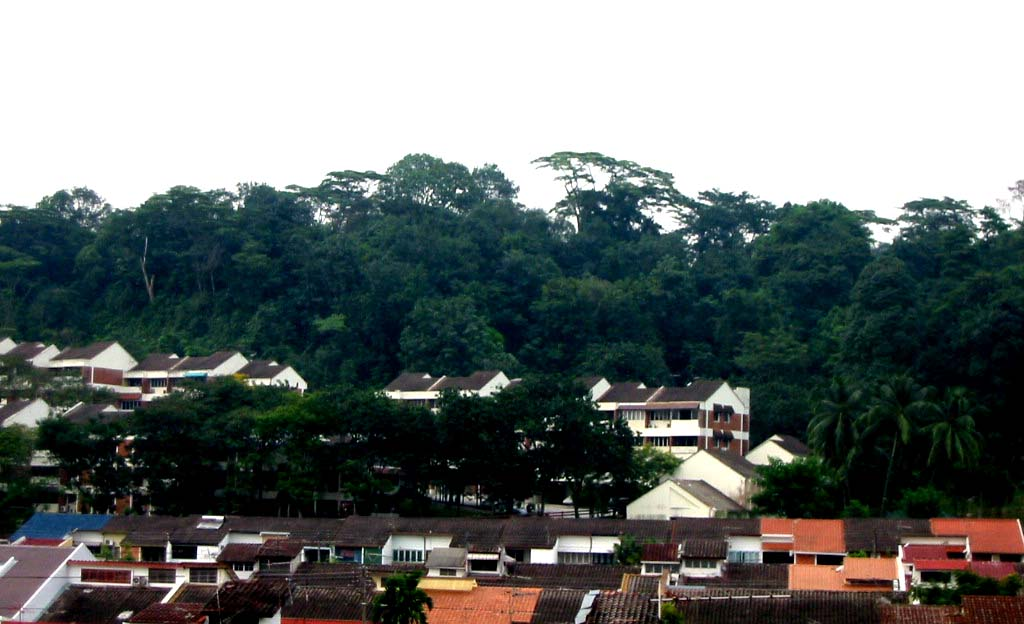
The secondary forests of Bukit Persekutuan and Bukit Damansara can be seen surrounding this part of Bangsar Park

East of Bangsar Park lies Bukit Persekutuan, a low density neighbourhood developed in the colonial days and Bukit Damansara. Most of the vegetation from the forest has not been cleared, thus it would appears as if the eastern neighbourhoods of Bangsar were actually surrounded by a jungle.

A few monsoon drains were constructed when Bangsar was developed. They have since been covered up, although they remain operational.

== Demographics ==
Bangsar Park is a popular residential area among both Malaysians and expatriates. It is a melting pot today with a good balance of different races living here. However, it was never always that way. The initial residents of Bangsar Park were mainly Ceylonese from Brickfields, who were mostly government clerks and looking for a new, clean neighbourhood to move into.

Bangsar Park does not have any commercial area. It is a purely residential area. The closest thing to a commercial area is the row of shophouses housing sundry shops, restaurants and a laundry shop.

However, residents of Bangsar Park do not find this a problem. They love the peace and quiet and the homely feel of the area as a result of it being a purely residential area. Besides, the commercial areas of Bangsar Baru, Lucky Gardens and Bangsar Utama are all within walking distance.

Bangsar Park has also a large population of Gujaratis. The Gujarati Association WP & Selangor building and Jain Mandir is also located at Lorong Maarof.

== Infrastructure ==
Sekolah Menengah Kebangsaan Bangsar is a secondary school located within Bangsar Park. However, most parents prefer sending their children to Sekolah Menengah Kebangsaan Bukit Bandaraya, which is just three minutes drive away, as it has a better academic record.

Pusat Kesihatan Umum Bangsar is a primary healthcare centre which is just walking distance from Bangsar Park. Universiti Malaya Medical Centre (UMMC), a public hospital is situated within five minutes drive, although access is through Petaling Jaya.

== Transport ==
Until recently Bangsar Park did not suffer from traffic congestion at any time of the day. However recent poorly planned and approved developments, such as Bangsar Hill Park, (that replaces the previous low density low cost housing that was Sri Pahang flats), are causing excessive congestion with now the formally quite inner road of Lorong Maarof frequently backing up through the taman.

Bangsar Park is easily accessible from any part of Kuala Lumpur. It is just a ten-minute drive from the Kuala Lumpur city centre. It is also connected to the city of Petaling Jaya via the Federal Highway.

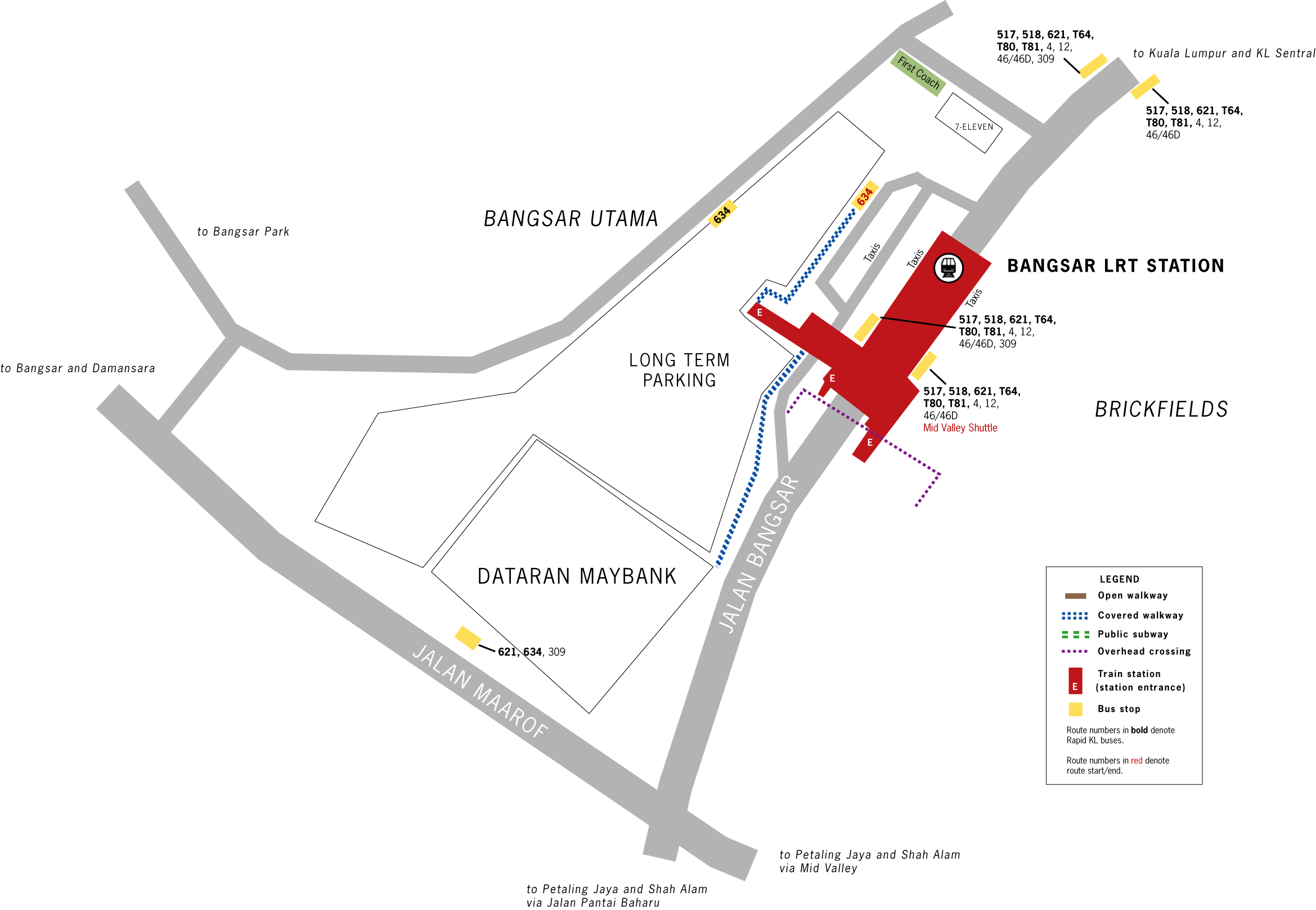
Location of Bangsar LRT and bus connections

The Bangsar LRT station (on Rapid KL's Kelana Jaya Line) is located along Jalan Bangsar. Abdullah Hukum, Kerinchi and Universiti LRT stations are also located nearby.

Bangsar is a five-minute drive from KL Sentral, a major transportation hub in neighbouring Brickfields.

Bangsar Park is also easily accessible using any of Rapid KL's bus services.

== See also ==
- Bangsar
