= Jalan Pantai Baharu =

Road in Kuala Lumpur, Malaysia

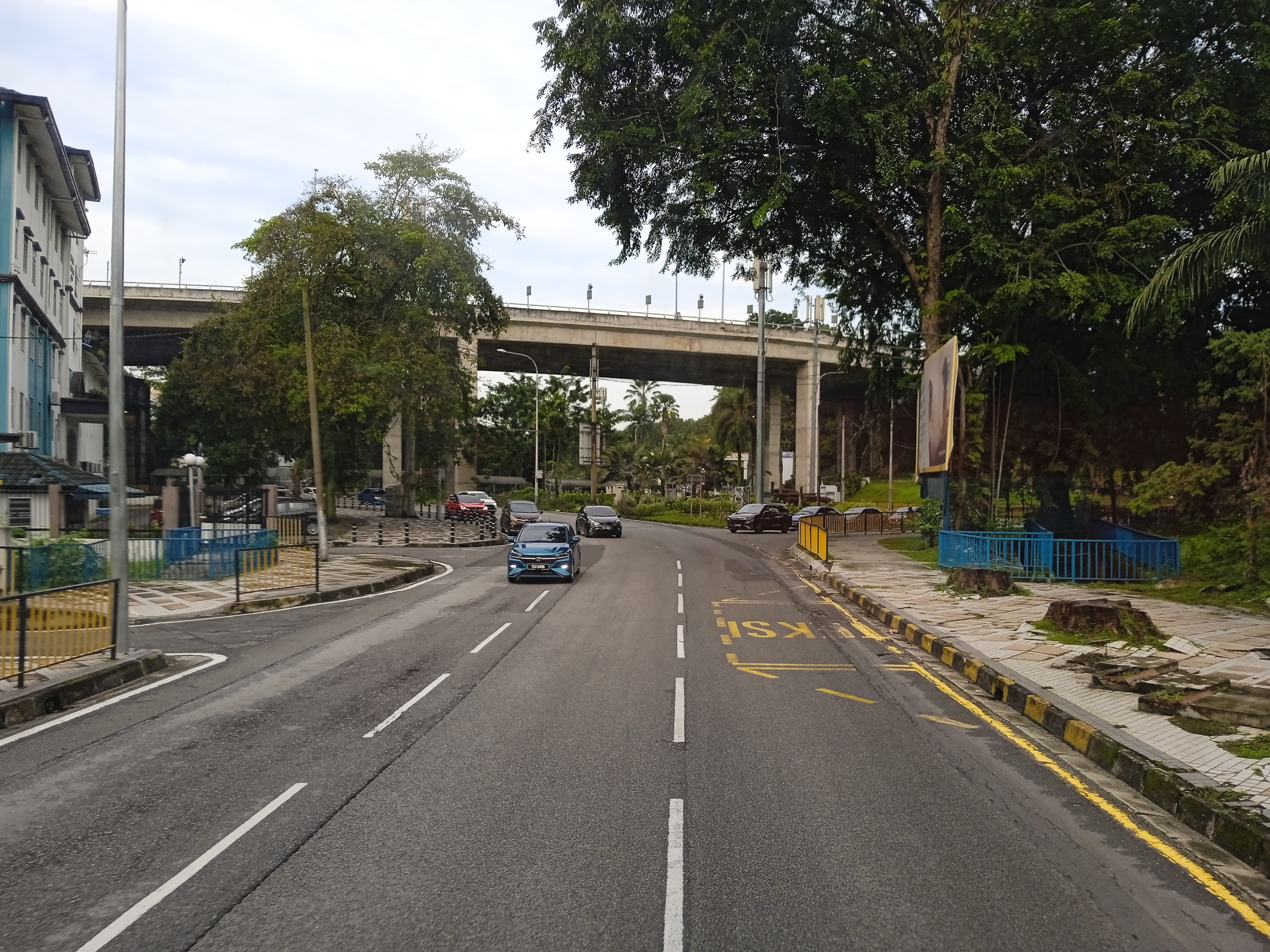

Route information
- Length: 1.5 km (0.93 mi)

Major junctions
- West end: Kerinchi Interchange; FT 2 Federal Highway
- FT 2 Federal Highway; New Pantai Expressway New Pantai Expressway
- East end: Pantai Baharu Interchange; New Pantai Expressway New Pantai Expressway

Location
- Country: Malaysia
- Primary destinations: Bangsar; Kuala Lumpur; KL Sentral

Highway system
- Highways in Malaysia; Expressways; Federal; State

Jalan Pantai Baharu is a major road in Kuala Lumpur, Malaysia.

== Landmarks ==
- Menara Telekom
- Kerinchi Pylon

== List of junctions ==
km	Exit	Junctions	To	Remarks
		Kerinchi	South; Jalan Kerinchi; Bangsar South (Kerinchi) FT 2 Federal Highway West; Petaling Jaya; Shah Alam; Klang East; City Centre; Cheras; Seremban	Diamond interchange
		Masjid Universiti Malaya		
				Start/End of separated carriageway
		Universiti Malaya		Junctions; Bangsar bound
		Persekutuan Pandu Puteri Malaysia main headquarters		
		Menara Telekom	Menara Telekom	Interchange; Kerinchi bound
				Start/End of separated carriageway
		Syarikat Bekalan Air Selangor (SYABAS) main headquarters		
		Jalan Bukit Pantai	North; Jalan Bukit Pantai; Bukit Bandaraya; Pantai Medical Centre	T-junctions
		Pantai Baharu-NPE	New Pantai Expressway New Pantai Expressway North; City Centre; Bangsar; KL Sentral South; Petaling Jaya; Bandar Sunway; Subang Jaya; Seremban	Diamond interchange
			East; KL Eco City (Kampung Haji Abdullah Hukum)	
