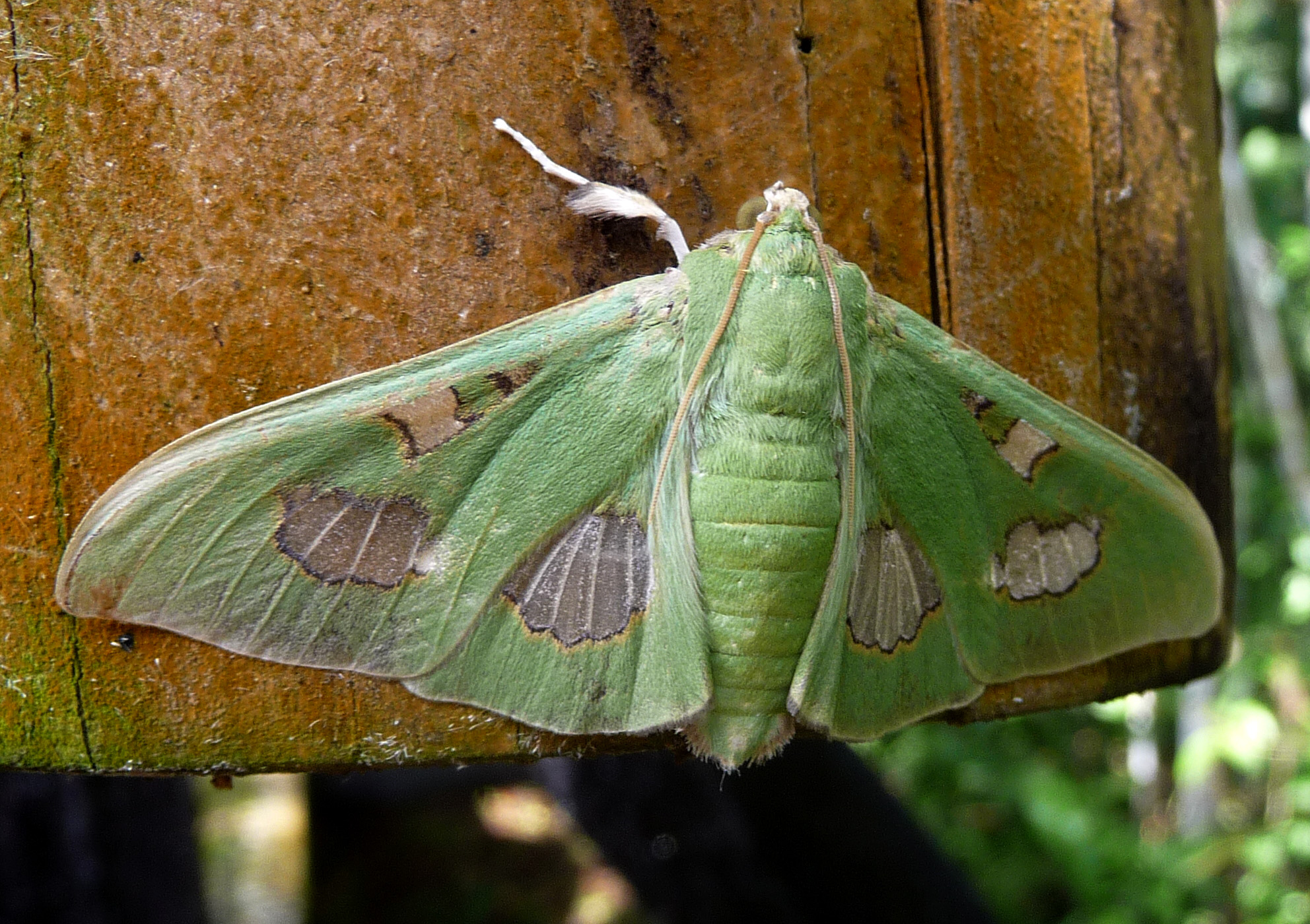

Scientific classification
- Kingdom: Animalia
- Phylum: Arthropoda
- Clade: Pancrustacea
- Class: Insecta
- Order: Lepidoptera
- Family: Crambidae
- Genus: Siga
- Species: S. liris

Binomial name
- Siga liris (Cramer, 1775)

Synonyms
- Phalaena liris Cramer, 1775; Margaronia thalassarcha Meyrick, 1936

= Siga liris =

Species of moth

Siga liris, the moonlight queen, is a moth in the family Crambidae described by Pieter Cramer in 1775. It is found in the West Indies, Peru, Brazil, Suriname, French Guiana, Ecuador and Bolivia. The habitat consists of primary rainforests and cloudforests at altitudes between 400 and 2,000 meters.
