= Boubacar =

Boubacar is both a surname and a given name, which is a West African variant of Abu Bakr.

Surname:

- Sarr Boubacar (born 1951), Senegalese footballer
- Sidi Mohamed Ould Boubacar (born 1957), Mauritanian politician and Prime Minister of Mauritania

Given name:

- Boubacar Bagili (born 1994), Mauritanian footballer
- Boubacar Barry (born 1979), Ivorian footballer
- Boubacar Dembélé (born 1982), French footballer
- Boubacar Dialiba (born 1988), Senegalese footballer
- Boubacar Diallo (filmmaker), Burkinabé film director
- Boubacar Diallo (footballer) (born 1985), Guinean footballer
- Boubacar Biro Diallo (1922–2025), Guinean politician
- Boubacar Diarra (footballer, born 1979), Malian footballer
- Boubacar Diarra (footballer, born 1994), Malian footballer
- Boubacar Boris Diop (born 1946), Senegalese writer and journalist
- Boubacar Kamara (born 1999) French footballer
- Boubacar Kébé (born 1987), Burkinabé-Malian footballer
- Boubacar Keita (born 1984), Guinean-born Nigerian footballer
- Boubacar Koné (born 1984), Malian footballer
- Boubacar Mansaly (born 1988), Senegalese footballer
- Boubacar Sanogo (born 1982), Ivorian footballer
- Boubacar Sylla (born 1991), Malian footballer
- Boubacar Talatou (born 1987), Nigerien footballer
- Boubacar Traoré (musician) (born 1942), Malian musician
- Boubacar Traore (runner) (born 1971) Guinean activist and Paralympic athlete

== See also ==
- Bubacarr
