= Bernadette Constantin =

French footballer (born 1963)

Personal information
- Date of birth: 29 March 1963 (age 63)
- Place of birth: Barbezieux-Saint-Hilaire, France
- Position: Midfielder

Senior career*
Years	Team	Apps	(Gls)
1977–1993	ASJ Soyaux		

International career
1978–1994	France	44	(2)

Managerial career
- 1996–2006: ASJ Soyaux
- 2009–2010: ASJ Soyaux
- * Club domestic league appearances and goals

Bernadette Constantin is a French former footballer who played as a midfielder for French club ASJ Soyaux of the Division 1 Féminine.

== International career ==
Constantin represented France 44 times from 1978 to 1994.
