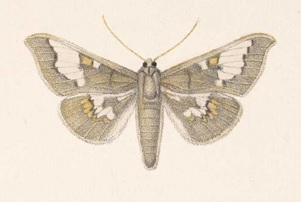

Scientific classification
- Kingdom: Animalia
- Phylum: Arthropoda
- Clade: Pancrustacea
- Class: Insecta
- Order: Lepidoptera
- Family: Crambidae
- Genus: Siga
- Species: S. pyronia

Binomial name
- Siga pyronia H. Druce, 1895

Synonyms
- Margaronia saturniana Meyrick, 1936

= Siga pyronia =

Species of moth

Siga pyronia is a moth in the family Crambidae first described by Herbert Druce in 1895. It is found in Panama and Costa Rica.

The forewings are pale grey, crossed beyond the middle from the costal to near the inner margin by a wide hyaline (glass-like) band. There is also a square hyaline spot at the end of the cell, with a yellow spot beyond it on the outer side. The costal margin is whitish. The hindwings are pale grey, crossed about the middle from the costal to near the inner margin by a waved, rather wide, hyaline band, edged with a zigzag yellow band on the outer side.
