= Bangsar =

Suburb of Kuala Lumpur, Malaysia

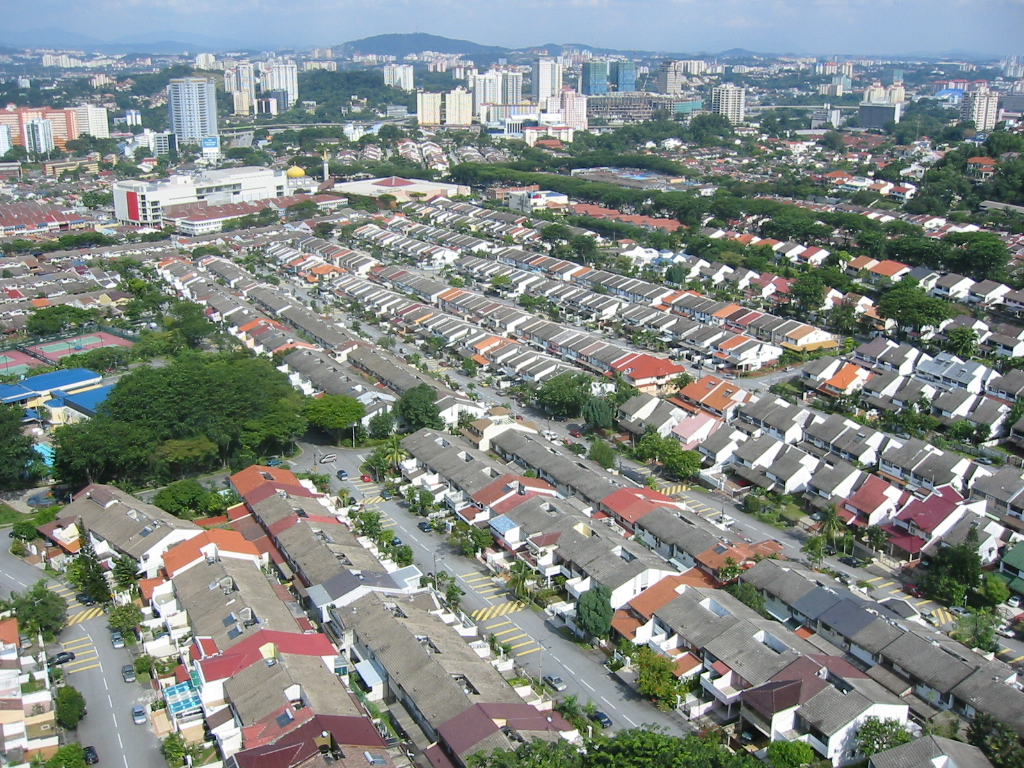
- A view of Bangsar, with the Terasek houses of Bangsar Baru in the foreground.

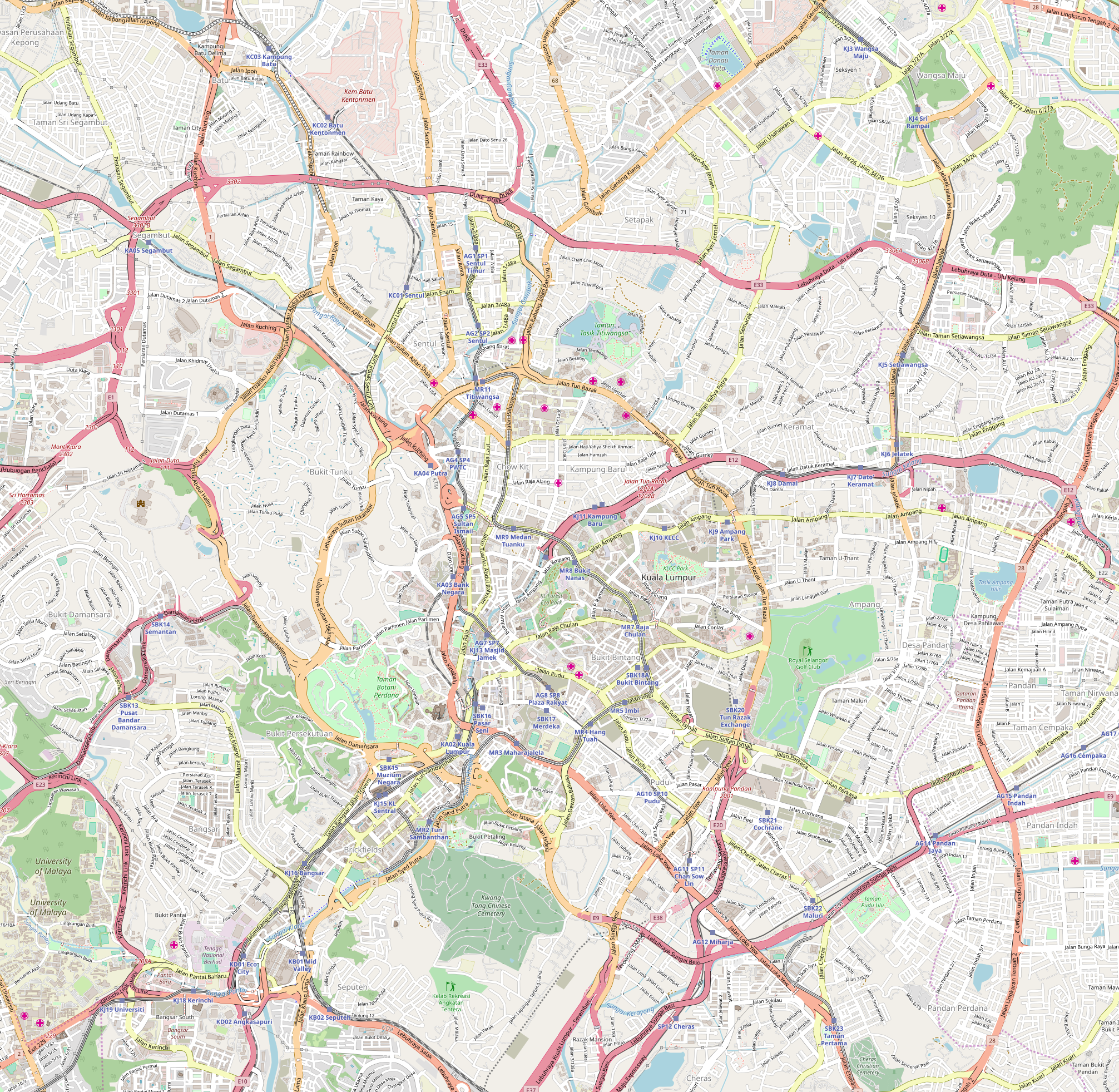
- Bangsar shown within central Kuala Lumpur Bangsar shown within Kuala Lumpur Bangsar shown within the Klang Valley Bangsar shown within Peninsular Malaysia
- Coordinates: 3°7′51″N 101°40′10″E
- Country: Malaysia
- State: Federal Territory of Kuala Lumpur
- Constituency: Lembah Pantai

Government
  - Local Authority: Dewan Bandaraya Kuala Lumpur
  - Mayor: Nor Hisham Ahmad Dahlan

Population
  - Estimate (2005): 40,000
- Time zone: UTC+8 (MST)
- Postcode: 59000, 59100 and 59200
- Dialling code: +60 322
- Police: Jalan Travers, Brickfields
- Fire: Pantai

Bangsar is a residential suburb on the outskirts of Kuala Lumpur, lying about 4 kilometres (2.5 mi) south-west of the city centre. It is part of the Lembah Pantai parliamentary constituency. Bangsar is administered by Dewan Bandaraya Kuala Lumpur (DBKL), unlike other townships in the Klang Valley such as Petaling Jaya and Subang Jaya which have their municipal councils. Neighbourhood residents' associations and business councils play a part in communicating with the local authority, but they exercise no legal or administrative power. Malays make up most of the population at 61%, followed by the Chinese at 24%, Indians at 15%.

== History ==
In the year 1906, Malaya was still under British administration. The London-based Kuala Lumpur Rubber Co. Ltd. (KLR) was incorporated on 19 May 1906. It set out to plant rubber trees around Kuala Lumpur to capitalise on the booming rubber price brought about by the introduction of the modern motor-car which require pneumatic rubber tyres as a replacement for horse-drawn carriages in the United States. Among KLR's first board members were Belgians Edouard Bunge and Alfred Grisar. The two men's names were contracted to create the name Bunge-Grisar rubber estate or Bangsar Estate. (Sometimes spelt "Bungsar".)

The Bangsar Estate was owned by its plantation firm Société Financière des Caoutchoucs (Socfin), before it was developed into a residential area. Bangsar Park was the first area to be developed for housing in Kuala Lumpur in 1969. From there Socfin began selling its land to private buyers and from then on, Bangsar began experiencing rapid development.

During the 1950s, several companies housed their staff and families in Bangsar due to its convenient location. The Malayan Railway (now Keretapi Tanah Melayu) used the Off Jalan Bangsar area because the Kuala Lumpur Railway Station and depot is less than three kilometres away in Brickfields. The National Electricity Board (now Tenaga Nasional Berhad) housed their staff in Bukit Bangsar since its headquarters is in Pantai Hills. Staff quarters are still found and used in Bangsar today.

Among the earliest government building here is Bangsar Hospital (European Hospital), built in the early 1900s. Towards the end of 1965, an eight-floor building for the Public Health College costing a million ringgit was built in Bukit Bangsar. In 1966, the Health Inspectors Training School and the Nurses Training School was shifted to the new premise in Bangsar. In 1967, the Institute for Public Health was officially inaugurated and eventually expanded to its present form.

During the 13 May Riots in 1969 many shops owned by local Chinese in Bangsar were burnt. Unsuspecting road users passing Bangsar on their way to Petaling Jaya were ambushed leaving Jalan Bangsar littered with burnt-out cars and motorcycles.

Eng Lian Enterprise Sdn Bhd developed the Bangsar Baru neighbourhood, comprising 1,125 houses and a thriving business community in 1974. The 1970s saw Bangsar recover into a housing suburb catering to the baby boomers settling in Kuala Lumpur. As their children grew up and formed a large part of the city's youth, Bangsar became a sought-after place for the trendy during the 1980s. Among companies that contributed to the demographic development of Bangsar include Sistem Televisyen Malaysia Berhad and Lever Brothers.

== Geography ==
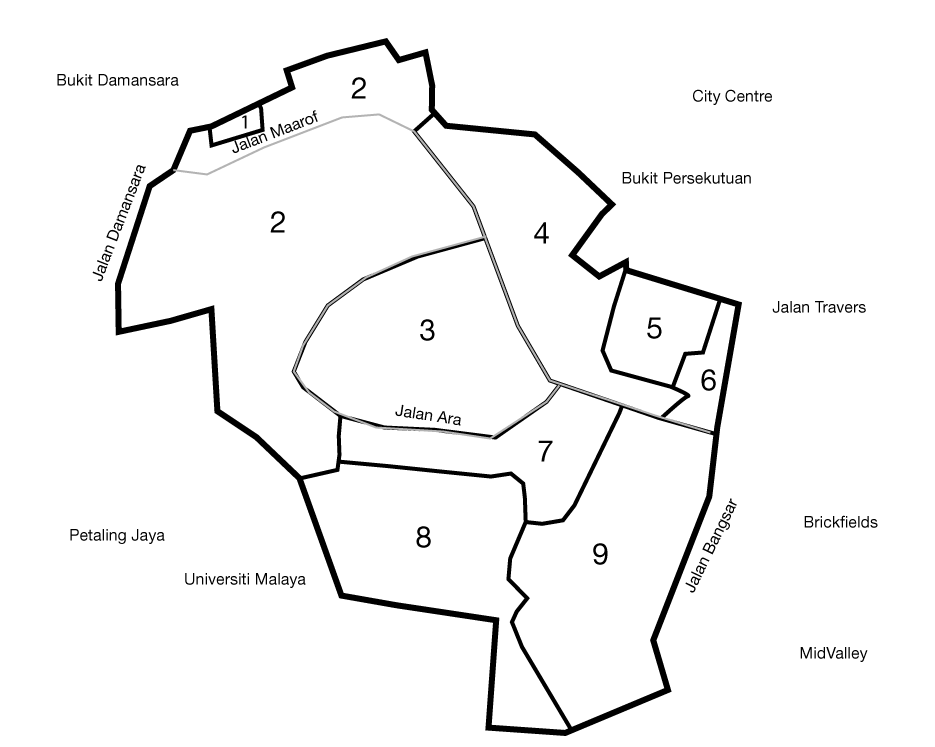
Neighbourhoods within Bangsar: 1. Taman SA; 2. Bukit Bandaraya; 3. Bangsar Baru; 4. Bangsar Park; 5. Bukit Bangsar; 6. Bangsar Utama; 7. Lucky Garden; 8. Pantai Hills; 9. Off Jalan Bangsar

Bangsar lies respectively to the north and south of the neighbouring areas of Pantai Dalam and Damansara, and 4 kilometres (2.5 mi) south-west of Kuala Lumpur city centre.

Bangsar is bounded by Jalan Bangsar and Jalan Pantai Baharu to the south, Universiti Malaya to the west, Jalan Damansara (Sprint Expressway and Bukit Damansara) to the north and Bukit Persekutuan to the east. It has the following neighbourhoods or housing estates: Bangsar Utama, Bukit Bangsar, Bangsar Park, Bukit Bandaraya, Taman SA, Bangsar Baru, Lucky Garden, Pantai Hills, and the areas off Jalan Bangsar. Jalan Maarof is Bangsar's main thoroughfare, dividing Bangsar into two main areas: east and west. On the east side lies Taman SA, Bangsar Park, Bukit Bangsar, Bangsar Utama and one-half of Bukit Bandaraya. The remainder of the other neighbourhoods lie on the west.

Bangsar is rather flat in the southern neighbourhoods of Bangsar Utama, Bangsar Park and the Off Jalan Bangsar area. This makes Jalan Bangsar in the south prone to flooding during heavy downpours. The terrain progressively rises towards the north up Bangsar Baru before making a steep drop in elevation after Bukit Bandaraya.

== Demographics ==
Its earliest settlers were railway workers living next to the KL-Klang railway track and rubber estate workers. Starting with a community of mostly Indian civil servants, comprising teachers, firemen, telecommunications officers and the police, Bangsar grew to include young professionals of various races including Malays, Chinese, Indian and expatriates, bringing its population to some 40,000 people by 2005.

== Culture ==
=== Food ===
McDonald's Bangsar Baru

A tau foo far or douhua beancurd dessert stall in Lucky Garden.

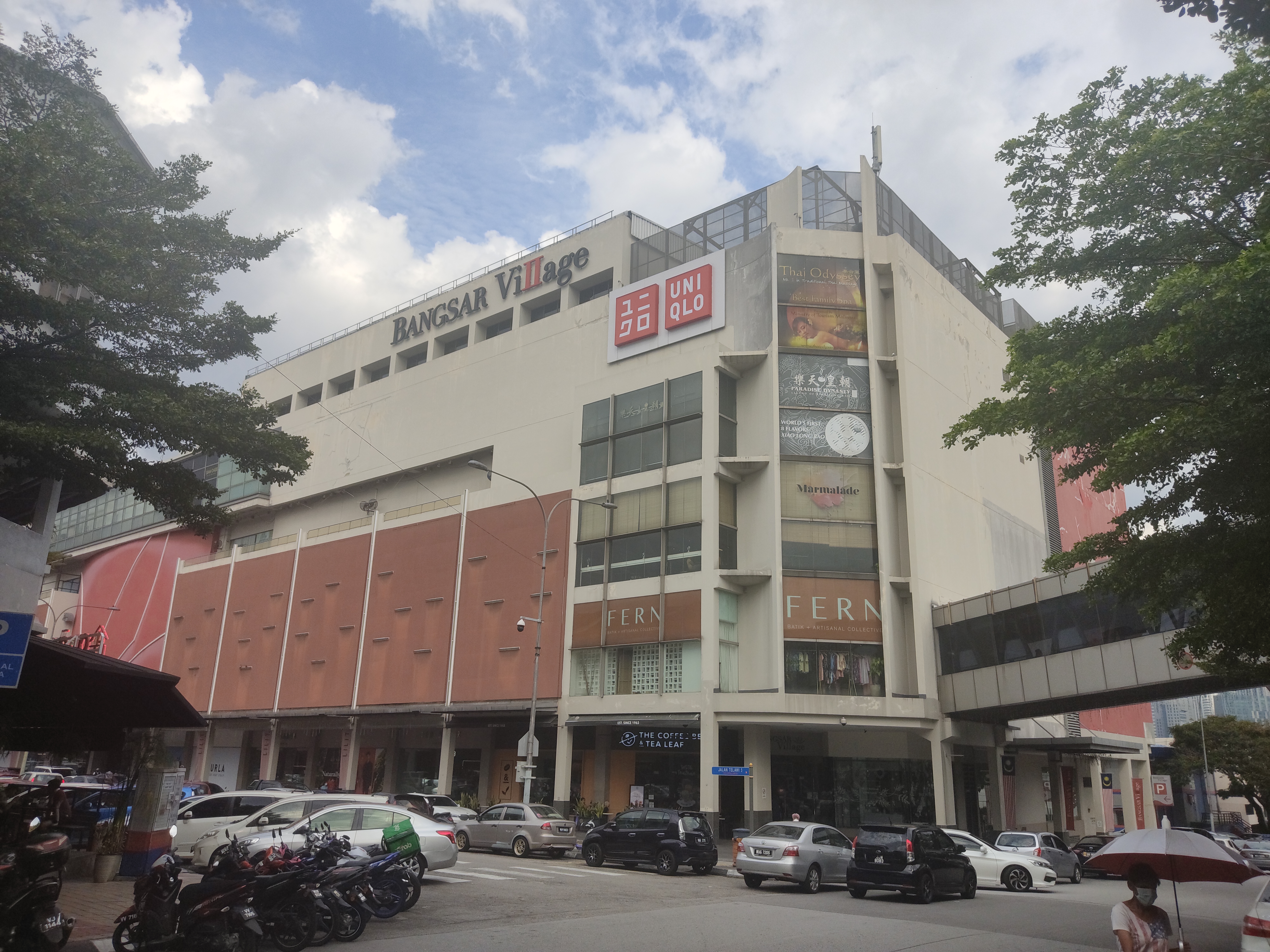
Bangsar Village

Typically Malaysian, Bangsar has a wide array of cuisine. Indian Muslim Mamak stalls, south Indian banana leaf restaurants and Malay warungs are easily found. Roadside hawkers usually open in the evenings and close late at night. There are many 24-hour Mamak and banana leaf restaurants. Meanwhile, Chinese kopitiam and seafood restaurants are a little harder to find.

There is also a hawker centre in Bangsar Baru, sometimes referred to as Bangsar Mamak, at the former Jolly Green Giant. Roadside stalls serving drinks, local cakes, burgers, hot dogs and cut fruit are found on many street corners. Ice cream, pastry, satay, rojak and milk is also sold on motorcycles and vans.

Mutiara Bangsar Tower located at Jalan Liku is another one of the most popular place in Bangsar, at 2nd floor food court, there are several Malay foodstalls.

The Telawi area in Bangsar Baru is sometimes known as "the strip". It has often been compared to Singapore's Holland Village. "The strip" can be skirted on foot in about 15 minutes. A large pasar malam, or night market, each Sunday lends the Bangsar Baru a colourful flavour. There is also a daily wet market in Lucky Garden. Another lesser-known pasar malam is held in Bukit Bangsar on Wednesdays.

=== Art and theatre ===
The Actors Studio was located at Bangsar Shopping Centre but has moved to Lot 10. There are several art galleries scattered around Bangsar, especially in Bangsar Baru. Roving buskers, usually performing covers, may be found in Bangsar Baru.

== Infrastructure ==
=== Medical ===
Bangsar's first hospital, Bangsar Hospital or European Hospital, was built in the early 1900s. After numerous upgrades and expansion exercises over the years, it is now known as the Institute for Public Health (Institut Kesihatan Umum). The privately owned Pantai Medical Centre was built in 1974 on Jalan Bukit Pantai. The medical centre houses the Pantai Institute of Health Sciences and Nursing. University Malaya Medical Centre (UMMC), a public hospital, is situated within a five-minute drive through Petaling Jaya. There are also many private clinics spread throughout Bangsar to meet the health needs of the residents.

=== Education ===
Kindergartens and nurseries are usually operated out of houses. Many tuition centres for school-aged students run out of shop lots and homes. Drama, ballet, and music schools also operate similarly.

Bangsar has three primary schools, which are Sekolah Kebangsaan Bukit Bandaraya, Sekolah Kebangsaan Bukit Pantai, and Sekolah Rendah Jenis Kebangsaan (T) Jalan Bangsar (a Tamil school). Secondary schools here are Sekolah Menengah Kebangsaan Bangsar and Sekolah Menengah Kebangsaan Bukit Bandaraya. University Malaya (UM) is five minutes from Bangsar. Also in the vicinity is the Maktab Perguruan Raja Muda (Raja Muda Teachers' College) and the Maktab Perguruan Bahasa (Language Teaching College).

=== Sports and recreation ===
The Bangsar Sports Complex has a swimming pool, a multipurpose hall with badminton courts as well as squash, tennis and basketball. Prospin Tennis management is based here. Several parks and playgrounds are scattered around, namely those at Jalan Bangkung, Jalan Rumpai, Jalan Terasek 7, Jalan Tempinis 5 and Jalan Kurau.

The Kilat Stadium is on Tenaga Nasional's grounds. The Kuala Lumpur Hockey Stadium is near Jalan Pantai Baharu, next to Universiti Malaya. It was the venue for the hockey events during the Kuala Lumpur Commonwealth Games in 1998.

== Religion ==
Bangsar is a diverse community with a Muslim mosque and 'suraus', Buddhist centres, Christian churches, Hindu temples and other places of worship. Saidina Abu Bakar As Siddiq Mosque was built in 1980 and is located next to Bangsar Village Shopping Centre. It serves the local Muslim community.

Ti-Ratana Buddhist Society, Kuala Lumpur & Selangor (HQ) is located at 17, Lorong Maarof. The centre is mainly focused on community and religious services to the neighbourhood and welfare projects to the poor and needy.

Sri Ramalingaeswarar temple, located near the junction of Lorong Maarof and Jalan Bangsar, serves Hindu devotees. There is also a Jain temple and Indian Muslim surau located in Bangsar Park.

Bangsar Gospel Centre (originally an offshoot of Jalan Imbi Chapel, in the Christian Brethren tradition) operates from a shophouse along Jalan Telawi Tiga. Bangsar Lutheran Church was restarted in 2000 and convened in a house along with Jalan Abdullah. The St Peter's Anglican Church is situated at Jalan Tempinis Kiri 1 near Lorong Riong, and there another church is located in Bukit Bandaraya near a primary school.

== Development ==
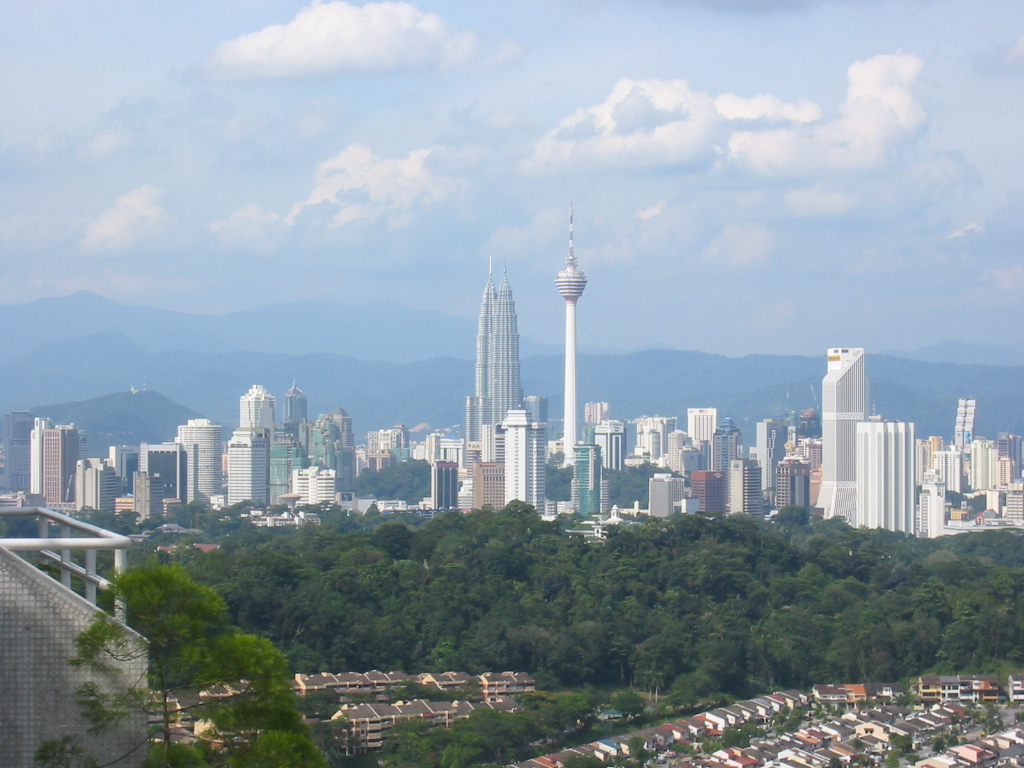
A view of the city and surrounding landscape from Bangsar

Bangsar's population has increased in recent years and led to an increase in traffic congestions and parking shortages. Developments in neighbouring Bukit Damansara and Mid Valley Megamall have caused increased traffic to pass through Bangsar, especially along Jalan Maarof.

New shops and attractions are sprouting up in Bangsar, but many do not survive for long, particularly food and entertainment outlets. Other long-standing outlets have been successful, and some have opened branches within Bangsar itself.

== Transport ==
Bangsar is four kilometres from the Kuala Lumpur city centre. It is also connected to Petaling Jaya via the Federal Highway or the Sprint Expressway. The New Pantai Expressway begins at Jalan Bangsar and passes through Jalan Pantai Baharu, Pantai Dalam, Jalan Kuchai Lama, Jalan Klang Lama, Bandar Sunway and terminates at Subang Jaya. The Sprint Expressway, at the northern end of Jalan Maarof connects to Bukit Damansara, Jalan Duta, Sri Hartamas, the New Klang Valley Expressway, the Damansara–Puchong Expressway and several suburbs in Petaling Jaya.

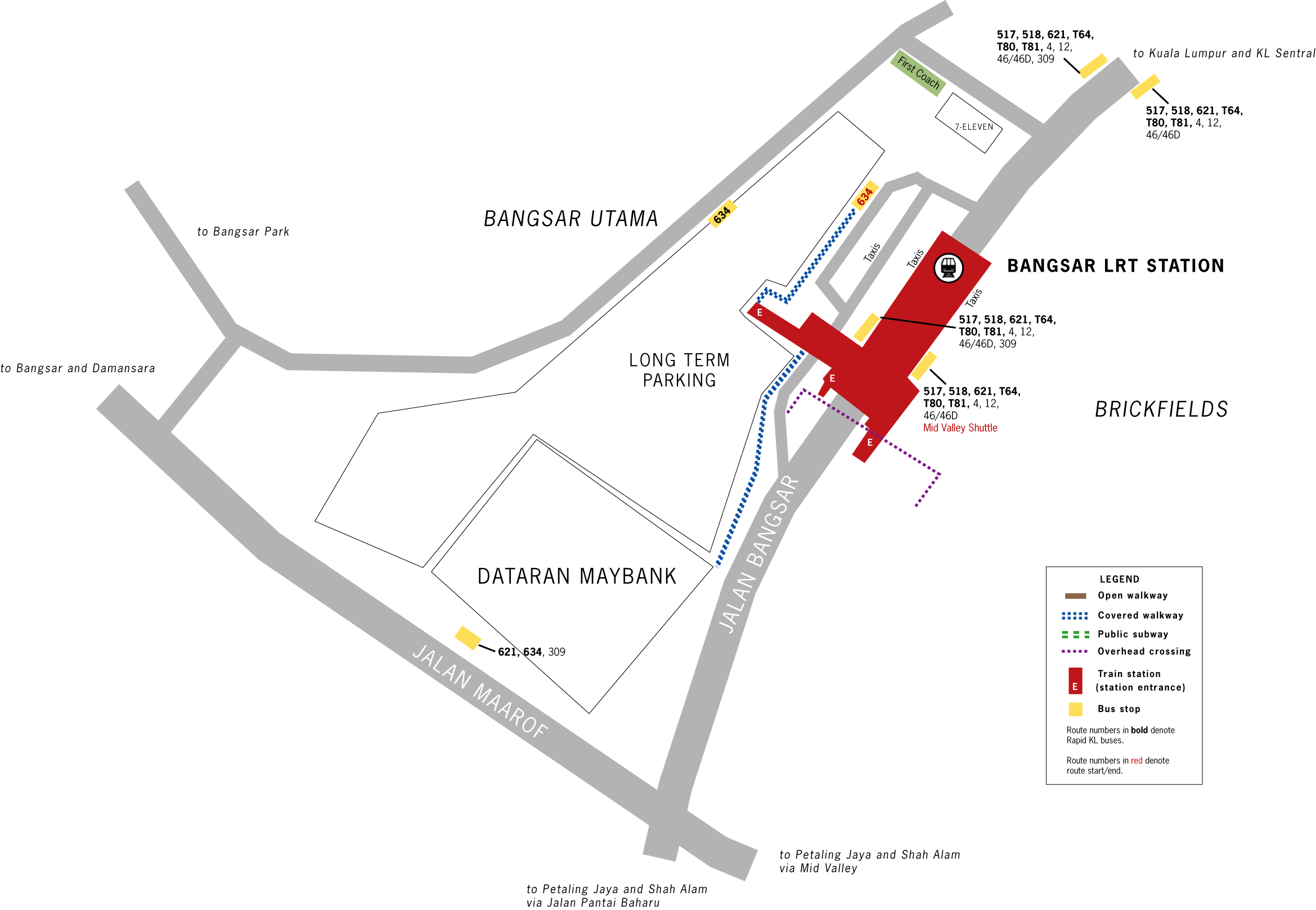
Location of Bangsar LRT and bus connections

The Bangsar LRT station on Rapid KL's Kelana Jaya Line is located on Jalan Bangsar. Abdullah Hukum, Kerinchi and Universiti LRT stations are also located nearby. Bangsar is a five-minute drive from KL Sentral, a major transportation hub in neighbouring Brickfields.

Bus services running through Bangsar are as follows.

- 822: (previously 5 and 621) Bangsar LRT – Mid Valley – Lucky Garden – Bangsar Baru – Bukit Bandaraya – Bangsar Shopping Centre – Bangsar Park – Bangsar LRT (loop service)
- T817: (MRT Feeder Bus) Pusat Bandar Damansara MRT – Bangsar Shopping Centre – Bangsar Park – Bangsar Baru - Mid Valley - Bangsar Baru - Bukit Bandaraya - Bangsar Shopping Centre - Pusat Bandar Damansara MRT (loop service)
- T850: (previously 908B and 634) Bangsar LRT – Bangsar Park – Bangsar Shopping Centre – MRT Semantan - Pusat Bandar Damansara – Jalan Semantan – Pusat Bandar Damansara – Bangsar Shopping Centre – Bangsar Park – Bangsar LRT (loop service)
- 309: (operated by Triton Commuter; ceased operation) KL Sentral – Jalan Semantan – Mont Kiara – Pusat Bandar Damansara – Bangsar Shopping Centre – Bangsar Park – Bangsar LRT – KL Sentral (loop service)

Many other Rapid KL buses head towards the city centre, and Selangor suburbs also ply Jalan Bangsar.

- 821 (previously 518): KL Sentral – Bangsar LRT – New Pantai Expressway – Jalan 1/112 – Jalan Pantai Murni (Hillpark) – Jalan Pantai Permai – Rumah Panjang
- 751 (previous T64): KL Sentral – Bangsar LRT – Jalan Pantai Baharu – Federal Highway – Persiaran Tengku Ampuan – Persiaran Selangor – Persiaran Sultan – Persiaran Jubli Perak – Persiaran Perusahaan – Persiaran Budiman (Seri Muda)
- 750 (previously T80): KL Sentral – Bangsar LRT – Jalan Pantai Baharu – Federal Highway – UiTM Shah Alam
- 772 (previously T81): KL Sentral – Bangsar LRT – Jalan Pantai Baharu – Federal Highway – Jalan Lapangan Terbang Subang – Jalan Bukit Badak (Subang Baru)

First Coach runs bus services from Lengkok Abdullah (near Bangsar LRT and Jalan Bangsar 7-Eleven) to Singapore's Novena Square (near Novena MRT station).
