= ASJ Soyaux-Charente =

Women's football club based in Soyaux, France

ASJ Soyaux Charente
- Full name: Association Sportive Jeunesse de Soyaux Charente
- Founded: 1968
- Ground: Stade Léo Lagrange
Home colours	Away colours

ASJ Soyaux Charente (Association Sportive Jeunesse de Soyaux Charente), commonly known as Soyaux, is a women's football club founded in 1968 and based in Soyaux, France. The club had played in France's top division except for spans of relegation to Division 2 Féminine in the 2010–11 and 2012–13 seasons, winning promotion back to the top flight each time. It also successfully appealed attempts by DNCG to relegate the club due to failed administrative reviews of its finances in both 2021 and 2022.

== History ==
The club was founded in 1968 as AS Soyaux. In 1982, the club changed its name to Association Sportive Jeunesse de Soyaux Charente.

== Honours ==
- D1 Féminine Champion: 1984

== Players ==
=== Current squad ===
As of 25 February 2024

Note: Flags indicate national team as defined under FIFA eligibility rules; some limited exceptions apply. Players may hold more than one non-FIFA nationality.

No.	Pos.	Nation	Player
2	DF	FRA	Léonie Multari
4	DF	FRA	Camille Collin
7	MF	FRA	Anna Clérac
8	MF	CMR	Fadimatou Aretouyap
11	DF	FRA	Laurine Pinot
12	MF	CAN	Vanessa Gregoire
13	FW	CIV	Stéphanie Gbogou

No.	Pos.	Nation	Player
14	MF	FRA	Cathy Couturier
15	FW	FRA	Agathe Donnary
18	DF	FRA	Emeline Saint-Georges
19	FW	FRA	Carla Cosme
20	DF	FRA	Aminata Keïta
22	MF	FRA	Siga Tandia
26	FW	FRA	Jessy Danielle Roux
30	GK	FRA	Romane Munich
40	GK	FRA	Raphaëlle Dubois

=== Former notable players ===
- Sylvie Bailly
- Natacha Brandy
- Martine Chapuzet
- Hawa Cissoko
- Bernadette Constantin
- Nora Coton-Pélagie
- Fernanda Da Mota
- Corinne Diacre
- Sylvie Dizier
- Valérie Dodille
- Émilie Dos Santos
- Candie Herbert
- Catherine Mercadier
- Ophélie Meilleroux
- Fiona O'Sullivan
- Françoise Paulhac
- Corinne Petit
- Florence Rimbault
- Sylvie Rousseau
- Rebecca Spencer
- Nathalie Tarade
- Nicole Turcot

== Controversy ==
In October 2021, Samantha Johnson, player of ASJ Soyaux, expressed her dissatisfaction to media with the club following the poor working conditions she allegedly experienced during her time at Soyaux. She had been with the club for less than three months, signing in July 2021.
