= Haplocambids =

Type of soil

Haplocambids are a type of Aridisol soil which are taxonomically identified as a suborder of Cambid soils. Haplocambids are the most commonly occurring Cambids and are characterized by minimal horizon expression. Soil with 0-5 slopes over 5 °C temperature and loam soil structure is Haplocambids. Almost cold condition and high altitude soil classified into this group. These soil types are the most commonly occurring of the Cambids. The soils are characterized by minimal horizon expression. Most Haplocambids have a redistribution of carbonates below the cambic horizon. The amount of carbonates, however, is insufficient to meet the definition of a calcic horizon, or the upper boundary is more than 100 cm below the soil surface. These soils occur on a variety of landscapes, commonly on those that are younger than late Pleistocene in age. Haplocambids are divided into 22 suborders.
