= Cinekambiya International Film Festival =

Film festival in The Gambia

Cinekambiya International Film Festival (CIFF) is an annual film festival held in The Gambia. The festival was founded by Prince Bubacarr Aminata Sankanu in 2015 and has since had three editions. It is supported by the German cultural organisation FilmInitiativ Köln.

== History ==
Cinekambiya International Film Festival was founded in 2015 as a festival for films made in indigenous languages not always considered in more mainstream festivals in the West. As many African filmmakers cannot afford to visit festivals on other continents, CIFF was designed to provide an alternative for them to expose their works to domestic and international audiences. The festival is organised by Sanxaari, the production company of Prince Bubacarr Aminata Sankanu.

The first edition of the festival took place from 26 December 2015 to 3 January 2016. The grand patron of this inaugural edition was Isatou Touray, and the theme was "African Cinema and Gender Valuation". It took place in the Global Hands Development Hub, Manduar, West Coast Region. Following this edition, FilmInitiativ Köln, a German cultural organisation focused on African cinema, pledged its support to future editions of the festival.

The second edition of the festival had the theme "The Youth Factor", and was also the inaugural festival for the Pan African Screen Awards (PASA). It took place from 20 May 2016 to 26 May 2016. The third edition of the festival had the theme "Film and the Rights to Truth in Transitional Justice" and took place from 25 December 2017 to 30 December 2017. The third edition was opened by a screening of Sankanu's production, Bleeding Blade. Over 20 Gambian-made films were screened during the festival, as well as productions from Togo, Germany, and Iraq.

=== Editions ===
Edition	Date	Theme	Notes
First	26 December 2015 – 3 January 2016	African Cinema and Gender Valuation	Isatou Touray as patron.
Second	20 May 2016 – 26 May 2016	The Youth Factor	Pan African Screen Awards attached.
Third	25 December 2017 – 30 December 2017	Film and the Rights to Truth in Transitional Justice	Premiere of Bleeding Blade.
Fourth	25 February 2019 – 28 February 2019	Film and The Gambia's National Development Plan, 2019–2021	
Fifth	6 December 2024 – 14 December 2024	The Advancement of Creative Freedom under the Barrow Administration since 2017	

== Pan African Screen Awards ==
The Pan African Screen Awards (PASA) were founded in 2008 by Sankanu, and the ceremony took place for the first time during the 2008 Out of Africa Film Festival in Germany. France-based Nigerian director Newton Aduaka won the main prize for his 2007 film Ezra on the Sierra Leone Civil War. In 2016, the awards were attached to CIFF as a result of Sankanu's involvement in both. In 2016, PASA had 17 categories. They were as follows:

- Best Male Actor
- Best Female Actor
- Best Comedian, Stage and Screen
- Best Director
- Best Cinematographer
- Best Scriptwriter/Playwright
- Best Feature Film
- Best Documentary
- Best Creative Group
- Best Production/Post Production Services
- Best Institutional Patron of the Arts
- Best Patron of the Arts
- Best Medium for Arts, Culture and Entertainment
- Best Reporter/Writer on Arts, Culture and Entertainment
- Best Television Content
- Best Celebrity Humanitarian Action
- Life Achievement Award
