= Saidina Abu Bakar As Siddiq Mosque =

Mosque in Kuala Lumpur, Malaysia

Coordinates: 3°07′46.5″N 101°40′18.5″E

- Masjid Saidina Abu Bakar As Siddiq

Religion
- Affiliation: Islam
- Branch/tradition: Sunni (Shafi'i)

Location
- Location: Bangsar, Kuala Lumpur, Malaysia
- Interactive map of Saidina Abu Bakar As Siddiq Mosque

Architecture
- Type: Mosque
- Style: Modernist
- Completed: 1982
- Minaret: 1

The Saidina Abu Bakar As Siddiq Mosque (MSABA) (Malay: Masjid Saidina Abu Bakar As-Siddiq) is a prominent mosque in Bangsar, Kuala Lumpur, Malaysia. The mosque was named after Muhammad's successor (Caliph) Abu Bakr.

== History ==
In 1976, residents in Bangsar requested for a mosque. It was approved by the Federal Territory Islamic Religious Council on 25 November 1977. A meeting was then held by local representatives with YB Datuk Othman Abdullah on 27 November 1977. It received RM700,000 in donations from the public. The government took over the project and placed it under the 3rd Malaysian 5-Year Plan. Planning for the construction of the mosque began in 1978 and its construction was completed in 1982.

The site was officially handed over to the contractor on 18 July 1980. The direction of the qibla was consented by The Mufti of the Federal Territories, S.S. Datuk Sheikh Abdul Mohsein bin Haji Salleh on 24 August 1980. Ground levelling work started in September 1980.

The mosque was officially handed over to the government on 29 March 1982. Its official opening ceremony was officiated by the Yang di-Pertuan Agong, Sultan Ahmad Shah ibni Almarhum Sultan Abu Bakar on 15 July 1982.

== Architecture and features ==
The mosque was originally designed for up to 3,500 people, but after expansion work was done in 2009 and 2010, it became capable of accommodating up to 4,000 people.

The architecture of the mosque follows traditional Malay mosque architecture, with a minaret (43.3 m), arches, dome (16.6 m wide and 24 m from the floor), and motifs, but also depicts levels of modernity in its form. It has an open concept, where air flow is allowed into the mosque as its doors are made from hard wood. Islamic patterned holes are also carved in between the motifs.

Its architectural designs are used in the construction of the Maldives National Mosque, as well as other prominent mosques in Kuala Lumpur such as Masjid Saidina Omar al-Khattab and Masjid Saidina Uthman ibn Affan.

=== Levels ===
The building has three levels:

==== Ground floor ====
- Classrooms for religious classes
- Office space and library
- Multipurpose hall that can accommodate up to 200 people
- Canteen
- Place for ablution and toilets

==== First floor ====
- Main praying hall for daily use by up to 1,000 people. Its full capacity can accommodate up to 4,000 people.

==== Second floor ====
- Additional praying hall for Fridays and special occasions
- Left wing: A school block comprising classrooms and school office

In the compound, there is a book shop and canteen for the public as well as for school students.

== Awards ==
The mosque has received several awards for serving as the temporary National Mosque of Malaysia while it was undergoing renovation.

In May 2023, the mosque received the Muhibbah Award for its efforts in promoting unity and muhibbah in the community over the recent years.

== See also ==
- Islam in Malaysia
