= Aboubacar Ibrahim Abani =

Nigerien diplomat

Niger's Permanent Representative to the United Nations
- Incumbent
- Assumed office 2005

Personal details
- Born: 16 March 1962 (age 64)
- Occupation: Diplomat

Aboubacar Ibrahim Abani (born 16 March 1962) is a Nigerien diplomat. He served as Niger's Permanent Representative to the United Nations beginning in 2005.

At the Nigerian Ministry of Foreign Affairs, Abani was Chief of the Consular Office for the Protection of Citizens of Niger from 1988 to 1989, Chief of the Section for United Nations Specialized Agencies from 1989 to 1990, and Chief of the Office for Inter-African Institutions from 1990 to 1991. He was then First Secretary of the Nigerian Embassy in Ethiopia as well as First Secretary of the Nigerian Mission to the Organisation of African Unity from 1992 to 1997.

At the Foreign Ministry, Abani was Chief of the Consular Division in the Directorate for Citizens of Niger Living Abroad from 1997 to 1998. He was an intern at the American University in Washington, D.C., from 1998 to 1999, then Chief of the Office of Multilateral Legal Affairs at the Foreign Ministry from 2000 to 2001. He was Technical Advisor to the Minister of Foreign Affairs from 2001 to 2003, then Diplomatic Advisor to the Presidency of Niger from 2003 until he was appointed as Permanent Representative to the UN in 2005. He presented his credentials as Permanent Representative on September 8, 2005.
