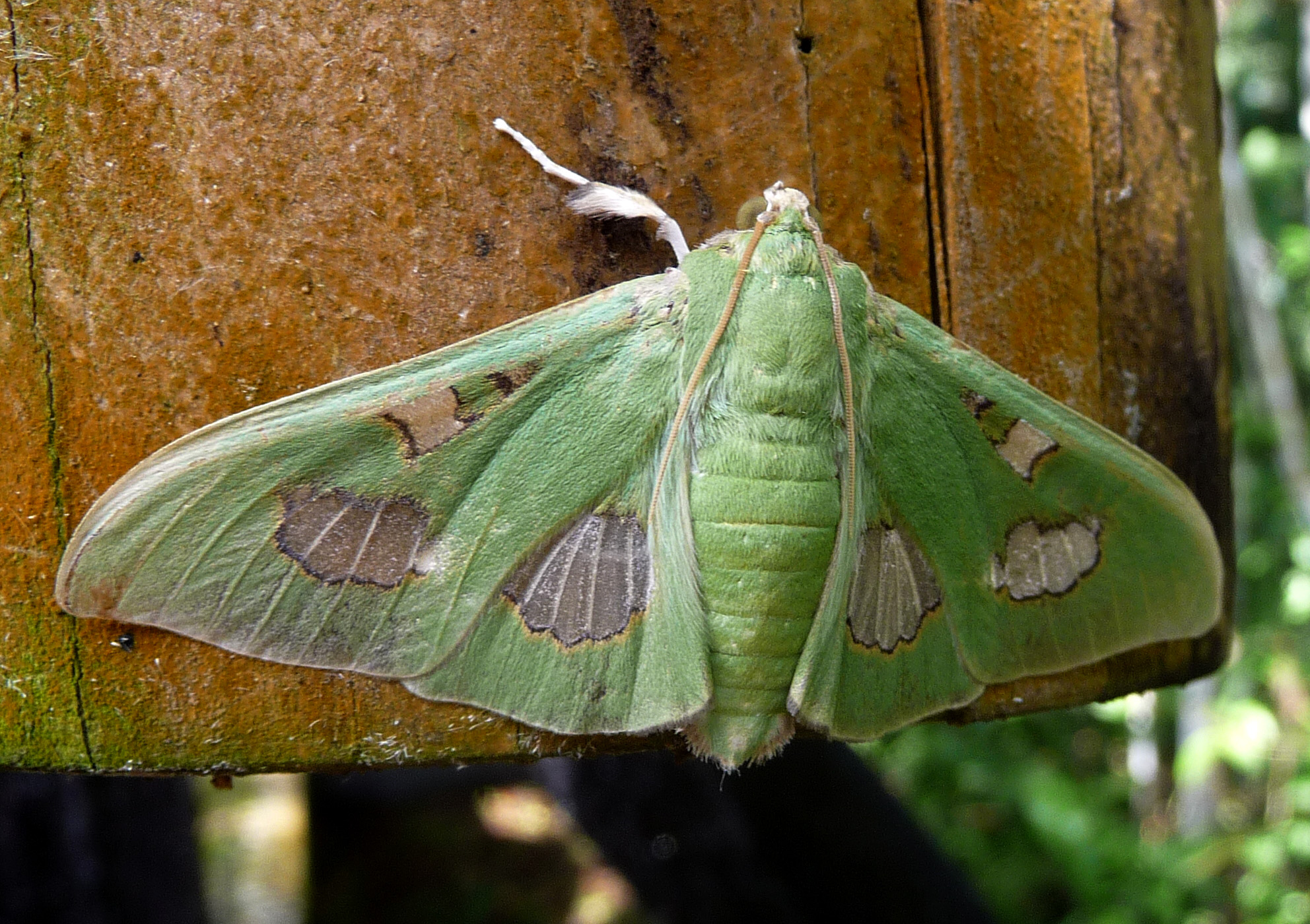

Scientific classification
- Kingdom: Animalia
- Phylum: Arthropoda
- Class: Insecta
- Order: Lepidoptera
- Family: Crambidae
- Subfamily: Spilomelinae
- Genus: Siga; Hübner, 1820

= Siga (moth) =

Genus of moths

Siga is a genus of moths of the family Crambidae described by Jacob Hübner in 1820.

== Species ==
- Siga liris (Cramer, 1775)
- Siga pyronia Druce, 1895
