= Boubacar Traore (runner) =

Guinean political activist and marathon runner

Boubacar Traore (born c. 1971) is a Guinean political activist, torture survivor and marathon runner.

== Biography ==
Born in the West African nation of Guinea, Traore studied law at Gamal Abdel Nasser University in Conakry. During the 1993 presidential election, he was caught giving information to a political opposition group and detained. During his detention, he was beaten so severely that his mangled right leg developed gangrene and had to be amputated at the hip.

In 2002, Traore left Guinea for the United States, where he was granted political asylum. He received medical and mental health treatment at the Bellevue/NYU Program for Survivors of Torture in Bellevue Hospital, New York City. On June 15, 2003, he ran his first race, a 5-mile course, finishing in 76 minutes on crutches. He was subsequently given a prosthetic running leg. In June 2004, he was selected to be the relay runner to carry the Olympic Flame into the United Nations complex. By December 2006, Traore had run the New York City Marathon five times, as well as other races including the Los Angeles Marathon. He thus gained a degree of celebrity in regional running circles. A volunteer who runs with Traore notes, "I don't know how many times I've heard spectators and other runners, including elite athletes at the front of the pack of the New York City marathon, shout to Boubacar, 'You're my hero.'" Traore was studying to take the LSAT tests in 2006.
