= Abubakar Tabuni =

Indonesian Papuan Guerilla leader (died 2024)

- Born: 1995/1996; Tembagapura, Mimika Regency, Central Papua, Indonesia
- Died: 4 April 2024 (aged 28); Grasberg mine, Mimika Regency, Central Papua, Indonesia
- Military career
- Allegiance: Free Papua Movement
- Unit: West Papua National Liberation Army
- Conflicts: Papua conflict

Abubakar "Kuburan" Kogoya (1995/1996 – 4 April 2024), known as Abubakar Tabuni, was an Indonesian Papuan separatist militant and leader of the West Papua National Liberation Army.

== Activity ==
Born in Tembagapura, Tabuni was a subordinate of Guspi Waker and one of the operation commanders in the Intan Jaya faction of Undius Kogoya (Kodap VIII) of TPNPB-OPM, the armed wing of the Free Papua Movement, a separatist organization which is seeking the secession of the territory currently administered by Indonesia as the provinces of Central Papua, Highland Papua, Papua, South Papua, Southwest Papua, and West Papua, serving as one of the group's leaders.

Tabuni took part in three attacks near the Grasberg mine, including a March 2020 attack that killed Graeme Thomas Weal, a New Zealander and wounded six others, a road ambush in October 2017 that left one police officer dead, and another attack in November the same year that wounded a company truck driver.

Tabuni was killed alongside fellow leader Natan Wanimbo by the Indonesian Army on 4 April 2024, during a shootout near the mine. He was 28.
