= Abu Bakr Ratib =

Egyptian fencer

Personal information
- Born: 12 June 1896

Sport
- Sport: Fencing

Abu Bakr Ratib (born 12 June 1896, date of death unknown) was an Egyptian fencer. He competed in the team foil event at the 1928 Summer Olympics.
