= Aboubacar Tandia =

French footballer (born 1983)

Personal information
- Date of birth: 3 October 1983 (age 43)
- Place of birth: Paris, France
- Height: 1.92 m (6 ft 4 in)
- Position: Striker

Youth career
- CFF Paris

Senior career*
Years	Team	Apps	(Gls)
2004–2005	Red Star 93	11	(0)
2005–2006	US Roye	31	(0)
2006–2007	Pau FC	24	(3)
2007–2008	Beauvais	1	(0)
2008–2009	Villemomble Sports	17	(4)
2009–2010	Naval 1º de Maio	11	(0)
2010–2011	Aulnoye	0	(0)
2011	US Sénart-Moissy	0	(0)
2012–2013	FCM Aubervilliers	0	(0)
Total		95	(7)
- * Club domestic league appearances and goals

Aboubacar Tandia (born 3 October 1983) is a French former professional footballer who played as a striker.

== Career ==
Tandia played for Red Star 93, US Roye, Pau FC, and AS Beauvais Oise.

After trialling with US Sénart-Moissy, he joined the club in October 2011.
