= Abu-Bakr al-Mansouri =

Dr. Abu Bakr Al-Mabrouk Al-Mansouri (Arabic: أبو بكر المبروك المنصوري) is a Libyan politician who served as Secretary of the General People's Committee (GPCO) of the Secretariat for Agriculture, Animal Wealth and Marine Resources. Some of his responsibilities include addressing matters relating to food security, agricultural development and managing the Great Manmade River project.

== Activities ==
On 25 March 2007, the Libyan Ministry of Agriculture hosted a two-day workshop organized by the Arab Maghreb Union where experts from Maghreb countries meet to discuss economic benefits of combating desertification and studied methods to revive interest and promote investment in the region. Experts from Tunisia, Morocco, Algeria, Mauritania, and Libya presented related research, exchanged experiences and various strategies.

During his opening address, Dr. al-Mansouri said severe weather conditions of desert areas and the shortage of resources has a direct effect on the agriculture development programs in the region and it is a threat to the Maghreb countries’ food production. He added that, "unsuitable agricultural practices and the misuse of land and irrigation water have contributed to the increase of desertification."

== Working Relationships ==
Al-Mansouri works closely with Engineer Adnan Gebril, who is Director of Agricultural development at the GPCO for Agriculture. Other associates include Technofarm International, an American agricultural company working in Libya.
