= Prince Bubacarr Aminata Sankanu =

Gambian film director

- Born: Aminata Sankanu; Sotuma Sere, Jimara, Upper River Region, The Gambia
- Occupation: Filmmaker
- Years active: 2012–present
- Notable work: Pain of Sorrow

Prince Bubacarr Aminata Sankanu is a Gambian film director and producer. A former journalist, he moved to Germany in 1998 and began creating films in 2012. He has since founded the Cinekambiya International Film Festival (CIFF), his own production company, Sanxaafi, and created a number of films. He is also a scholar of African cinema affiliated to the University of Stirling.

== Early life ==
Sankanu was born in the village of Sotuma Sere in Jimara, Upper River Region. He is a Serahulleh (also known as Soninke) and is Muslim. Sankanu is part of the Sankanu Kaggoro clan, part of the ancient Ghana Empire, and is a prince of his clan. He attended Nusrat High School and was a student journalist.

== Journalistic career and move to Germany ==
Sankanu initially worked as a journalist in The Gambia. He was a freelance journalist who wrote primarily for Upfront, the APRC's party newspaper, as well as the BBC, Voice of America, Deutsche Welle, and The Point. In some of his articles, he used the pen name Wagadou Ghana Remme. He went on to work for Gambia Radio & Television Service (GRTS) on national TV, and hosted the programme 'Business Forum'. Sankanu experienced "a strange illness" anytime he entered the GRTS building and saw others suffering health problems as a result of serving the Jammeh regime. He secretly applied for a visa to the Schengen area, and left for Germany in 1998.

== Film career ==
Sankanu decided to become a professional filmmaker in 2012. He founded the Cinekambiya International Film Festival (CIFF) in 2015. He has founded two companies, Sanxaanu Kaggoro Film Kaffo (Sanxaafi) and Tagadou Productions, and studied a diploma in digital film and animation at the SAE Institute in Cologne, Germany. Sanxaafi has since become the first Gambian film company to become part of the Pan African Federation of Filmmakers.

In September 2017, Sankanu finished a film called Bleeding Blade about female genital mutilation (FGM). The film follows a girl called Sira Camara whose fiancé attempts to force her to be circumcised after they agree to marry; the film sees the community eventually turn against the practice. Campaigner and politician Isatou Touray said that the film was "a very good start" in changing public opinion in the fight against FGM in The Gambia.

Sankanu also created a number of other films in 2017. They include Pain of Sorrow, on discrimination against girls with disabilities, Kuu Buka Labang, a Mandinka-language film on changes in destiny, and Hisirinwalle, a Sarahulleh-language family drama on ungratefulness. Pain of Sorrow was nominated for Best Film in the 2018 Hollywood African Prestigious Awards (HAPAwards). He is said to have inspired a "new wave of Gambian filmmaking."

In 2018, two films that Sankanu co-produced were released. They include Faasike, with Bubacarr Zaidi Jallow, and Chossano, with Papis Kebbah Jobarteh and Frank Adim. Sankanu is also executive producer of Kelefa Saane, a documentary on a precolonial Senegambian hero, directed by Fenja Braster.

== Film scholarship ==
Sankanu has stated that his aim is to become a "full professor of cinema." As such, he has advanced this aim by studying MLitt Film Studies: Theory and Practice at the University of Stirling, UK. Having graduated, Stirling have offered him the chance to study a PhD in African cinema at the institution, which he has deferred until his work schedule is not so busy.

== Personal life and politics ==
Sankanu was married for 15 years, but it was dissolved in the Brikama Cadi Court after the marriage produced no children. He married again but this only lasted for five years. He is now on his third marriage.

On 5 September 2016, Sankanu won a primary election in the German Pirate Party to stand as a candidate in parliamentary elections in North Rhine-Westphalia on 14 May 2017. He was to be a candidate in Wahkreis 17, covering the southeast district of Cologne. Sankanu previously attempted to stand as a candidate in European Parliament elections, but he missed the deadline for candidate registration. Sankanu has also been the Pirate Party's commissioner for sub-Saharan Africa.
