= Siga Tandia =

French footballer (born 1987)

Personal information
- Date of birth: 10 November 1987 (age 39)
- Place of birth: Paris, France
- Height: 5 ft 7 in (1.70 m)
- Position: Defender

Youth career
- 2002–2005: Tremblay FC
- 2005–2006: Tours

Senior career*
Years	Team	Apps	(Gls)
2006–2008	Tours	34	(2)
2008–2023	Soyaux	278	(23)

International career
2009–2010	France	3	(0)
- * Club domestic league appearances and goals

Siga Tandia (born 10 November 1987) is a French football player of Malian descent. Tandia plays as a defender and is a member of the France women's national football team having made her debut on 28 October 2009 against Estonia.

== Career ==
Tandia was born in Paris and grew up in the commune of Clichy-sous-Bois where she played football with her five brothers. She was very adept at not only football, but also judo having earned a brown belt as a child. Tandia, who considered herself a tomboy, initially was hesitant to playing football with girls and preferred playing with boys. Eventually, she re-considered and joined the women's section of local club Tremblay FC, who were playing in the Division d'Honneur Régionale. After almost three years at the club, she ventured to the city of Tours joining the women's section of Ligue 2 club Tours FC. The women's section were, ironically, playing in D2 Féminine, the second division of women's football. Over the course of two seasons with the club, Tandia played in 37 total matches scoring two goals.

Following the 2007–08 season, Tandia moved up a division joining D1 Féminine mainstay ASJ Soyaux. At Soyaux, Tandia appearing in 18 league matches during the 2008–09 season starting them all. Tandia continued her consistent play for the 2009–10 season appearing in 9 of the 10 league matches contested so far this season.

== International career ==
Tandia had never appeared for France in the youth sections of the women's national team. She did appear for her nation at the 2009 University Games, held in Belgrade, Serbia. France finished in 4th-place position after losing 1–4 to Great Britain in the bronze medal match. In October 2009, Tandia was a surprise selection to the national team for 2011 FIFA Women's World Cup qualification matches against Iceland and Estonia. She received the call up notice via SMS from team manager Bruno Bini. She made her debut in the Estonia match appearing as a substitute in the 77th minute for Sandrine Soubeyrand. France won the match 12–0. Tandia returned to the team for another qualification match the following month against Serbia. She did not appear in the match, which France won 2–0.
