= 2009–10 Paris Saint-Germain FC (women) season =

Paris Saint-Germain Féminine
2009–10 season
- Owner: Colony Capital
- Chairperson: Pierre Noguès
- Head coach: Camillo Vaz
- Stadium: Stade Municipal Georges Lefèvre; Parc des Princes
- Division 1 Féminine: 3rd
- Challenge de France: Winners
- Top goalscorer: League: Camille Abily (12); All: Camille Abily (12)
- Highest home attendance: 5,892 vs Juvisy, Division 1 Féminine, 18 October 2009
- Lowest home attendance: 100 vs Saint-Brieuc, Division 1 Féminine, 2 May 2010
- Biggest win: 7–0 vs Saint-Brieuc, Division 1 Féminine, 6 December 2009
- Biggest defeat: 0–3 vs Juvisy, Division 1 Féminine, 11 April 2010
Home colours	Away colours

The 2009–10 season was French football club Paris Saint-Germain's 11th season in Division 1 Féminine and their 9th consecutive season in the top division of French football. PSG was managed by Camillo Vaz - in his first season since replacing Éric Leroy. The club was chaired by Pierre Noguès. Paris Saint-Germain was present in the 2009–10 Division 1 Féminine and the 2009–10 Challenge de France. After finishing eighth in the last championship, Paris SG began the campaign with the desire to continue their progress among the elite and work hard for them to conquer their first major trophy. Following a disappointing 2008–09 season, Éric Leroy resigned and Camillo Vaz took over as manager in June 2009. Camillo Vaz was supported by assistant coach Karine Noilhan, who had been in charge of PSG's DH squad. Paris Saint-Germain entered the new season with great ambition and signed French internationals Élise Bussaglia, Julie Soyer and Jessica Houara during the summer transfer market. Camille Abily, Sonia Bompastor, Zohra Ayachi, Charlotte Poulain and Stéphanie Legrand also joined Paris Saint-Germain. The capital club started the season looking to finish within the top five in Division 1 and to pull something off in the Challenge de France.

== Squad ==
French teams are limited to four players without EU citizenship. The squad list includes only the principal nationality of each player; several non-European players on the squad have dual citizenship with an EU country. Also, players from the ACP countries—countries in Africa, the Caribbean, and the Pacific that are signatories to the Cotonou Agreement—are not counted against non-EU quotas due to the Kolpak ruling. Note: Flags indicate national team as defined under FIFA eligibility rules; some limited exceptions apply. Players may hold more than one non-FIFA nationality.

No.	Pos.	Nation	Player
1	GK	FRA	Bérangère Sapowicz
2	DF	FRA	Julie Soyer
3	DF	FRA	Laure Boulleau
4	DF	FRA	Laure Lepailleur
5	DF	FRA	Sabrina Delannoy
6	MF	FRA	Caroline Pizzala
7	MF	FRA	Jessica Houara
8	MF	FRA	Sonia Bompastor (on loan from Washington Freedom)
9	FW	FRA	Zohra Ayachi
10	MF	FRA	Camille Abily (on loan from Gold Pride)
11	MF	FRA	Élise Bussaglia
12	DF	FRA	Nonna Debonne
13	MF	FRA	Charlotte Poulain

No.	Pos.	Nation	Player
14	MF	FRA	Stéphanie Hoffele
15	MF	FRA	Nora Coton-Pélagie
16	DF	FRA	Stéphanie Legrand
18	FW	FRA	Candice Prévost
19	DF	FRA	Gwenaëlle Pelé
21	MF	FRA	Sophie Perrichon
22	DF	FRA	Félicité Hamidouche
23	DF	FRA	Émilie L'Huillier
24	FW	FRA	Ingrid Boyeldieu
25	GK	FRA	Marie-Océane Bayol
—	FW	FRA	Cindy Thomas
—	FW	FRA	Ella Kaabachi

== Board and staff ==
Manager	(France) Camillo Vaz
Assistant Coach	(France) Karine Noilhan
Goalkeeping Coach	(France) Jean Paul Plaire
Physical Trainer	(France) Denis Lefebve
Head Doctors	(France) Dr. N'Guyen, Stéphane Cascua
Physiotherapists	(France) Cédric Dupuis

Updated to match played 18 September
Source: PSG.fr

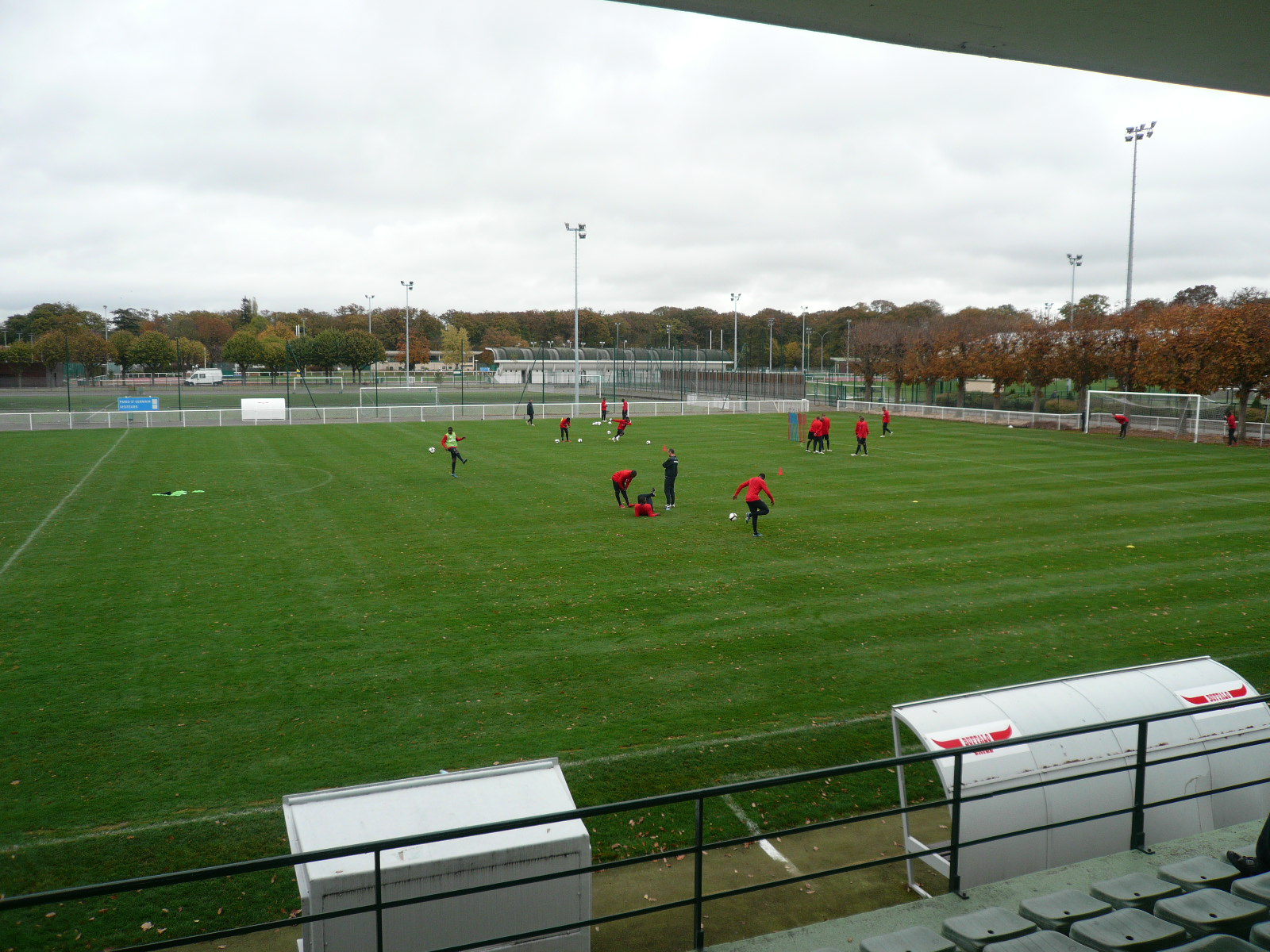
Stade Georges Lefèvre

General Delegate	(France) Pierre Noguès
General Manager	(France) Brigitte Henriques
Academy Director	(France) Laure Lepailleur
Administrative Secretariat	(France) Irène Desperak, Jessica Flavigny
Sporting Director	(France) Sophie Perrichon
Ground (capacity and dimensions)	Stade Georges Lefèvre (3,500 / -)

Updated to match played 18 September
Source: PSG.fr

== Division 1 Féminine ==
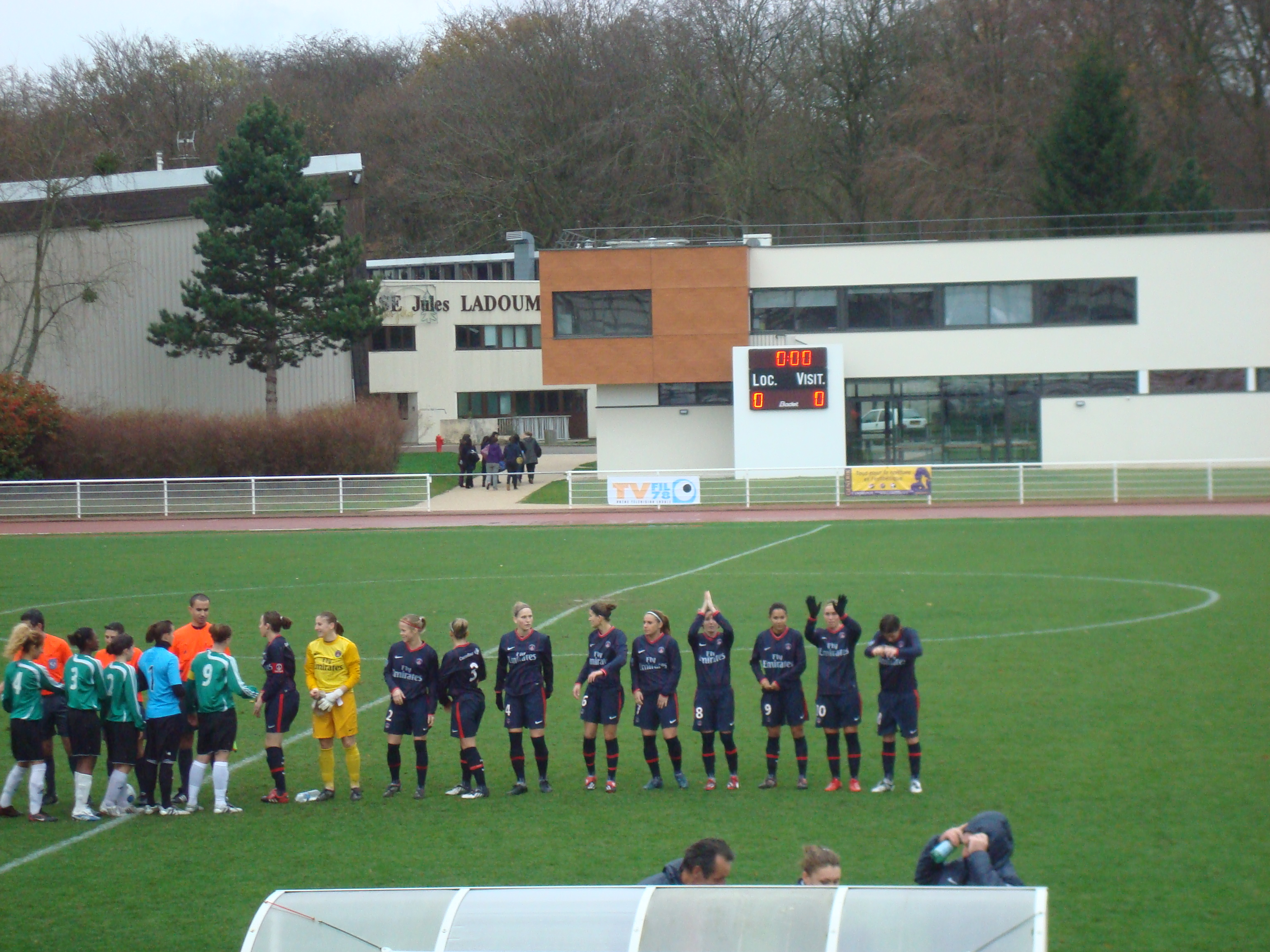
PSG against Montigny.

Paris Saint-Germain dominated Saint-Étienne from the start and were rewarded with a victory thanks to goals from Nora Coton-Pélagie and Laure Boulleau. PSG's first match at home served to confirm their good start to the season by earning a great win over Soyaux. Paris Saint-Germain recorded their third consecutive win courtesy of a narrow triumph away to Toulouse as they reached the second spot, levelled on points with leaders Olympique Lyonnais. Paris Saint-Germain returned home and claimed a narrow victory over archrivals Juvisy in the first derby at the Parc des Princes. With a record 5,892 spectators, PSG started the game brighter and Caroline Pizzala's cross from the left was met on the penalty spot by Camille Abily. Paris Saint-Germain defeated Hénin-Beaumont by a four-goal margin. Sixth game, sixth victory and still no goals against after "Les Rouge-et-Bleu" recorded another impressive victory at the Camp des Loges against La Roche, which allowed Paris Saint-Germain to keep up with Lyon at the top of the table.

Paris Saint-Germain ended their run as they conceded a draw against third-placed Montpellier but climbed to the top spot in the league thanks to the Hénin-Beaumont's surprising victory over Lyon. "Les Parisiennes" claimed a narrow victory over Montigny as PSG had yet to concede a goal. Paris returned home and recorded a crushing victory over Saint-Brieuc. Paris Saint-Germain conceded a last minute goal, their first of the season, which gave Lyon the draw, but maintained the top spot. Camille Abily, on loan from Los Angeles Sol, was transferred to Gold Pride. Paris Saint-Germain recorded a crushing victory over Yzeure thanks to a stunning hat-trick by Sonia Bompastor. Sonia Bompastor, on loan from Washington Freedom, and Camille Abily, on loan from Gold Pride, extended their stay until 1 March 2010. The capital club claimed the honorary title of winter champions, which rewarded the good work of the technical staff and the excellent atmosphere in the team. Unbeaten since the start of the season, PSG recorded 9 wins and 2 draws with 32 goals scored and only 1 conceded. Camille Abily's early goal gave PSG a narrow victory over Soyaux. Camille Abily scored a hat-trick to give PSG the victory over Toulouse at the Camp des Loges. Paris Saint-Germain recorded a great win against Hénin-Beaumont and allowed PSG to maintain the top spot. Paris failed to defeat La Roche and conceded their second goal of the season, but maintained the top spot. Sonia Bompastor and Camille Abily returned to their respective clubs, after their six-month loan at the capital expired. Robin Leproux handed them a bouquet of flowers thanking and recognizing their vital participation throughout the season.

After being unbeaten for 17 days, Paris Saint-Germain retained the first place but was surprised by a determined Montpellier. A goal from Élise Bussaglia just after the break gave emotion to the match, but the damaged was done. On their rescheduled match, Paris lost the top spot to Juvisy after suffering a crushing defeat to their arch-rivals and registered their third consecutive match without victory, a streak which coincidentally began after Bompastor and Abily left the club. Juvisy scored early and despite PSG trying to equalize, the "FCFJ" killed off any remaining hope on the second half with two goals in ten minutes. Paris Saint-Germain defeated Montigny by a large margin of goals, retaining the second place. PSG walked over Saint-Brieuc with a crushing victory as Candice Prévost scored a hat-trick. PSG was looking to get back in the fight for the title against Lyon. The match was an opportunity for Lyon to get revenge as PSG had eliminated them in the cup semi-finals a few weeks ago. Both clubs had shared points in their first league match and it seemed to be a very balanced meeting. "Les Parisiennes", however, underperformed and narrowly achieved a scoreless draw against a dominant Lyon. PSG secured a 3rd-place finish after their victory over Yzeure. The title, however, was not lost as the capital club looked for a victory and wished both Lyon and Juvisy were defeated. Paris defeated Saint-Étienne at the Camp des Loges, thus concluding an excellent season which saw the club win the Challenge de France and finish in 3rd place. PSG midfielder Élise Bussaglia was nominated for the UNFP Female Player of the Year but the trophy was awarded to league top scorer and Stade Briochin player Eugénie Le Sommer.

=== League table ===
Pos	Team	P	W	D	L	GF	GA	GD	Pts	
1	Lyon (C)	22	18	2	2	92	11	+81	78	UEFA Women's Champions League; Main Round
2	Juvisy	22	18	1	3	58	18	+40	77	UEFA Women's Champions League; First Qualifying Round
3	Paris Saint-Germain	22	16	4	2	62	8	+54	74	
4	Montpellier	22	15	3	4	48	18	+30	70	
5	Yzeure	22	9	4	9	28	32	–4	53	

=== Results summary ===
Overall								Home						Away					
Pld	W	D	L	GF	GA	GD	Pts	W	D	L	GF	GA	GD	W	D	L	GF	GA	GD
22	16	4	2	62	8	+54	52	9	1	1	43	2	+41	7	3	1	19	6	+13

Source: Footofeminin

=== Results by round ===
Round	1	2	3	4	5	6	7	8	9	10	11	12	13	14	15	16	17	18	19	20	21	22
Ground	A	H	A	H	A	H	A	A	H	A	H	A	H	A	H	A	H	H	A	H	A	H
Result	W	W	W	W	W	W	D	W	W	D	W	W	W	L	W	D	L	W	W	D	W	W
Position	3	2	2	2	2	2	1	1	1	1	1	1	1	2	1	1	1	2	2	3	3	3

Source: Footofeminin
A = Away; H = Home; W = Win; D = Draw; L = Loss

Match Results

Date	Opponents	H / A	Result	Scorers	Attendance	Position	Referee
2009
27 September	Saint-Étienne	A	0 – 3	Coton-Pélagie 30', 76', Boulleau 90+5'	200	3rd	(Provence-Alpes-Côte d'Azur) Aurélie Efe
4 October	Soyaux	H	5 – 0	Ayachi 4', Bompastor 10', Coton-Pélagie 24', Pizzala 45', Stribick-Burckel 55' (o.g.)	100	▲2nd	(Île-de-France) Karine Lasalle
11 October	Toulouse	A	0 – 1	Abily 77'	210	2nd	(Alsace) Sabrina Himber
18 October	Juvisy	H	1 – 0	Abily 7'	5,892	2nd	(Brittany) Élodie Coppola
1 November	Hénin-Beaumont	A	0 – 4	Bompastor 4', Ayachi 30', Delannoy 60', Coton-Pélagie 62'	100	2nd	(Lorraine) Nathalie Mittelbronn
8 November	La Roche	H	5 – 0	Bompastor 9', Abily 17', 21', Pizzala 60', Guerin 72' (o.g.)	200	2nd	(Nord-Pas-de-Calais) Cindy Gosselin
15 November	Montpellier	A	0 – 0		200	▲1st	(Alsace) Sabrina Himber
29 November	Montigny	A	0 – 1	Abily 79'	350	1st	(Rhône-Alpes) Solenne Bartnik
6 December	Saint-Brieuc	H	7 – 0	Bussaglia 15', Poulain 22', 43', Abily 39', Boyeldieu 52', Bompastor 60', Prévost 74'	150	1st	(Lorraine) Nathalie Mittelbronn
13 December	Lyon	A	1 – 1	Poulain 38'	300	1st	(Alsace) Séverine Zinck
2010
24 January	Yzeure	H	4 – 0	Thomas 73', Bompastor 75', 77', 84'	200	1st	(Franche-Comté) Florence Guillemin
31 January	Soyaux	A	0 – 1	Abily 4'	200	1st	(Languedoc-Roussillon) Dorothée Ily
7 February	Toulouse	H	9 – 0	Abily 15', 68', 80', Poulain 44', Bompastor 73', 84', Delannoy 75', Boyeldieu 89', 90+1'	200	1st	(Franche-Comté) Emilie Mougeot
11 April	Juvisy	A	3 – 0		1,100	▼2nd	(Centre-Val de Loire) Sabine Bonnin
28 February	Hénin-Beaumont	H	3 – 0	Abily 3', 12', Bompastor 26'	100	▲1st	(Alsace) Sabrina Himber
13 March	La Roche	A	1 – 1	Thomas 6'	343	1st	(Brittany) Élodie Coppola
4 April	Montpellier	H	1 – 2	Bussaglia 41'	450	1st	(Brittany) Élodie Coppola
18 April	Montigny	H	6 – 0	Boyeldieu 33', 35', Soyer 51', Pizzala 63', 90', Boulleau 87'	200	▼2nd	(Lorraine) Nathalie Mittelbronn
2 May	Saint-Brieuc	A	0 – 5	Prévost 25', 29', 65', Ayachi 72', Coton-Pélagie 82'	100	2nd	(Alsace) Sabrina Himber
30 May	Lyon	H	0 – 0		500	▼3rd	(Provence-Alpes-Côte d'Azur) Noëlle Robin
6 June	Yzeure	A	1 – 2	Houara 2', 7'	250	3rd	(France) Gwendoline Defente
13 June	Saint-Étienne	H	2 – 0	Prévost 38', Houara 51'	200	3rd	(Île-de-France) Karine Lasalle

== Challenge de France ==
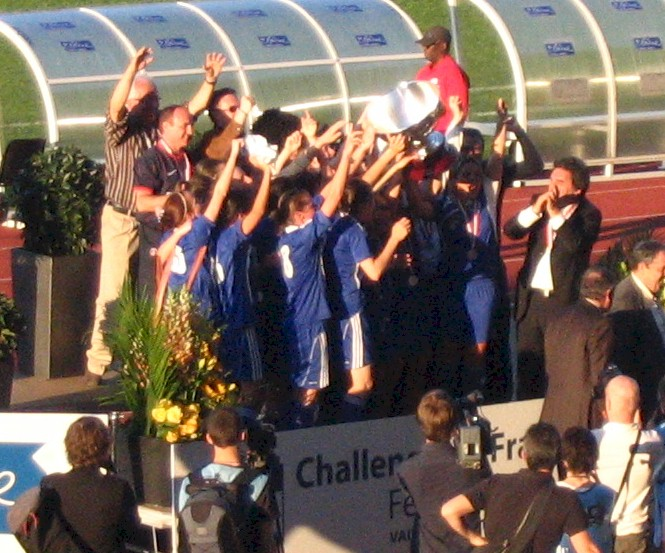
PSG players celebrate winning the Challenge de France.

Paris Saint-Germain entered the 2009–10 Challenge de France season having last reached the final in 2008. Last season, they were eliminated in the Round of 32 by Le Mans. PSG entered the competition during the Round of 32 phase. Paris were pitted against Montigny. Nonna Debonne headed the opener after a good cross from Julie Soyer, before Montigny equalized through Rachelle Bracchi. After the break, Laure Lepailleur's last-gasp goal qualified PSG to the last-16. Paris were pitted against second tier club Le Mans. After a very close match, scoreless in regular and extra time, Paris took revenge and qualified for the quarter-finals on penalties, leaving Le Mans empty handed. Paris Saint-Germain then visited Hénin-Beaumont looking to reach the semi-finals, where a match versus Olympique Lyonnais looked very likely to happen. Caroline Pizzala, Cindy Thomas, Laure Lepailleur and Jessica Houara scored in the first half. After the break, Hénin-Beaumont scored twice through Pauline Crammer, but the capital club advanced to the semi-finals looking for a spot in the Final.

The match was an opportunity for both Paris Saint-Germain and Lyon to get back on track their domestic seasons through cup glory. Paris Saint-Germain, meanwhile, had the chance to get revenge, as history had pitted these sides together in the cup before. It was in the 2007-08 edition, when Lyon clinched their third title after defeating the capital club by a 3-0 margin at the Stade de France. Having withstood the French champion in the first half, Paris Saint-Germain conceded three goals in the second period. Both clubs had shared points in their only match of the season and this seemed to be a very balanced meeting. Paris Saint-Germain opened the score through Caroline Pizzala, but Lyon quickly equalized through Isabell Herlovsen. Despite a host of chances for both clubs, Paris Saint-Germain, in a thrilling scenario, earned a dramatic win, 3-2 on penalties over OL after extra time couldn't separate them. Like their male counterparts, they qualified for the Challenge de France Final, the equivalent of the Coupe de France, and, in their second final, they looked to clinch the club's first major title against three-time winners and defending champions Montpellier.

On 23 May 2010, Paris Saint-Germain captured the Challenge de France becoming the club's first major title and most prestigious honour to date. The capital club captured the cup by defeating Montpellier 5–0 in the final at the Stade Robert Bobin. The scoreline is the largest gap in the cup's young history. It is also the first time in French football history that both the male and female sections of a club occupy both the country's national cups. The male section of Paris Saint-Germain claimed the French Cup on 1 May. "Les Parisiennes" controlled the match from start to finish and Ingrid Boyeldieu opened the score after Candice Prévost's volley bounced off the crossbar. After the break, Caroline Pizzala doubled the advantage after a good cross from Jessica Houara. PSG found the third after Houara set free Nora Coton-Pélagie, who killed Montpellier's remaining hopes. Élise Bussaglia, with a 25-yard shot, and Pizzala, with her second of the night, rounded up the scoreline.

=== Matches ===
21 February 2010 Round of 32	Montigny	1-2	Paris Saint-Germain	Montigny-le-Bretonneux
			Debonne 5'; Lepailleur 87'	Stadium: Parc des Sports de la Couldre; Referee: Cindy Gosselin

7 March 2010 Round of 16	Paris Saint-Germain	0-0 (5-4 p)	Le Mans	Saint-Germain-en-Laye
				Stadium: Stade Municipal Georges Lefèvre; Referee: Karine Lasalle

21 March 2010 Quarter-finals	Hénin-Beaumont	2-4	Paris Saint-Germain	Hénin-Beaumont
	Crammer 48', 53'	Report	Pizzala 6'; Thomas 10'; Lepailleur 43'; Houara 45'	Stadium: Stade Raymonde Delabre; Referee: Karine Lasalle

25 April 2010 Semi-finals	Paris Saint-Germain	1-1 (3–2 p)	Lyon	Saint-Germain-en-Laye
	Pizzala 10'	Report	Herlovsen 18'	Stadium: Stade Municipal Georges Lefèvre; Attendance: 700; Referee: Florence Guillemin

23 May 2010 Final	Paris Saint-Germain	5-0	Montpellier	Bondoufle
	Boyeldieu 19'; Pizzala 54', 85'; Coton-Pélagie 68'; Bussaglia 71'	Report		Stadium: Stade Robert Bobin; Attendance: 4,200; Referee: Sabine Bonnin
