= 2010–11 Paris Saint-Germain FC (women) season =

Paris Saint-Germain
2010–11 season
- General Delegate: Pierre Noguès
- Manager: Camillo Vaz
- Stadium: Stade Georges Lefèvre
- Division 1 Féminine: 2nd
- Challenge de France: Round of 32
- Top goalscorer: League: Kátia (12); All: Kátia (12)
- Highest home attendance: 500 vs Montpellier (29 May 2011)
- Lowest home attendance: 100 vs Saint-Brieuc (7 November 2010)

The 2010–11 season was French football club Paris Saint-Germain's 12th season in Division 1 Féminine and their 10th consecutive season in the top division of French football. Paris Saint-Germain was managed by Camillo Vaz - in his second season since replacing Éric Leroy. The club was chaired by Pierre Noguès. Paris Saint-Germain was present in the 2010–11 Division 1 Féminine and the 2010–11 Challenge de France. Christophe Dedouche replaced Karine Noilhan as assistant coach. During the summer, the face of the team changed slightly. Three players left the capital club: Ingrid Boyeldieu, Émilie L'Huillier and Stéphanie Hoffele. Montpellier's Léa Rubio and Montigny's Léa Le Garrec, both champions with France in the 2010 UEFA Women's Under-19 Championship, signed for Paris Saint-Germain. Charlotte Lozè, also from Montpellier, joined former Lyon striker Kátia at the club. As seen in Zohra Ayachi's words, Paris Saint-Germain was aiming for a second place in the league to dispute the UEFA Women's Champions League next season:

The goal is simple for us: finish between the first two in the league in order to dispute the European Cup next year. We narrowly missed qualifying last season and we do not want to repeat it again. Play the European Cup would be a nice reward for the group and for the club.

— Zohra Ayachi, 18 October 2010

== Squad ==
French teams are limited to four players without EU citizenship. The squad list includes only the principal nationality of each player; several non-European players on the squad have dual citizenship with an EU country. Also, players from the ACP countries—countries in Africa, the Caribbean, and the Pacific that are signatories to the Cotonou Agreement—are not counted against non-EU quotas due to the Kolpak ruling. Note: Flags indicate national team as defined under FIFA eligibility rules; some limited exceptions apply. Players may hold more than one non-FIFA nationality.

No.	Pos.	Nation	Player
—	GK	FRA	Marie-Océane Bayol
—	GK	FRA	Stéphanie Legrand
—	GK	FRA	Bérangère Sapowicz
—	DF	FRA	Laure Boulleau
—	DF	FRA	Nonna Debonne
—	DF	FRA	Sabrina Delannoy
—	DF	FRA	Félicité Hamidouche
—	DF	FRA	Laure Lepailleur
—	DF	FRA	Julie Soyer
—	MF	FRA	Zohra Ayachi
—	MF	FRA	Élise Bussaglia
—	MF	FRA	Nora Coton-Pélagie

No.	Pos.	Nation	Player
—	MF	FRA	Jessica Houara
—	MF	FRA	Ella Kaabachi
—	MF	FRA	Charlotte Lozè
—	MF	FRA	Caroline Pizzala
—	MF	FRA	Charlotte Poulain
—	MF	FRA	Coralie Reguengo
—	MF	FRA	Léa Rubio
—	FW	FRA	Aurélie Conforti
—	FW	FRA	Léa Le Garrec
—	FW	FRA	Candice Prévost
—	FW	BRA	Kátia
—	FW	FRA	Cindy Thomas

== Board and staff ==
Manager	(France) Camillo Vaz
Assistant Coach	(France) Christophe Dedouche
Goalkeeping Coach	(France) Jean Paul Plaire
Physical Trainer	(France) Denis Lefebve
Head Doctors	(France) Dr. N'Guyen, Stéphane Cascua
Physiotherapists	(France) Cédric Dupuis

Source: PSG.fr

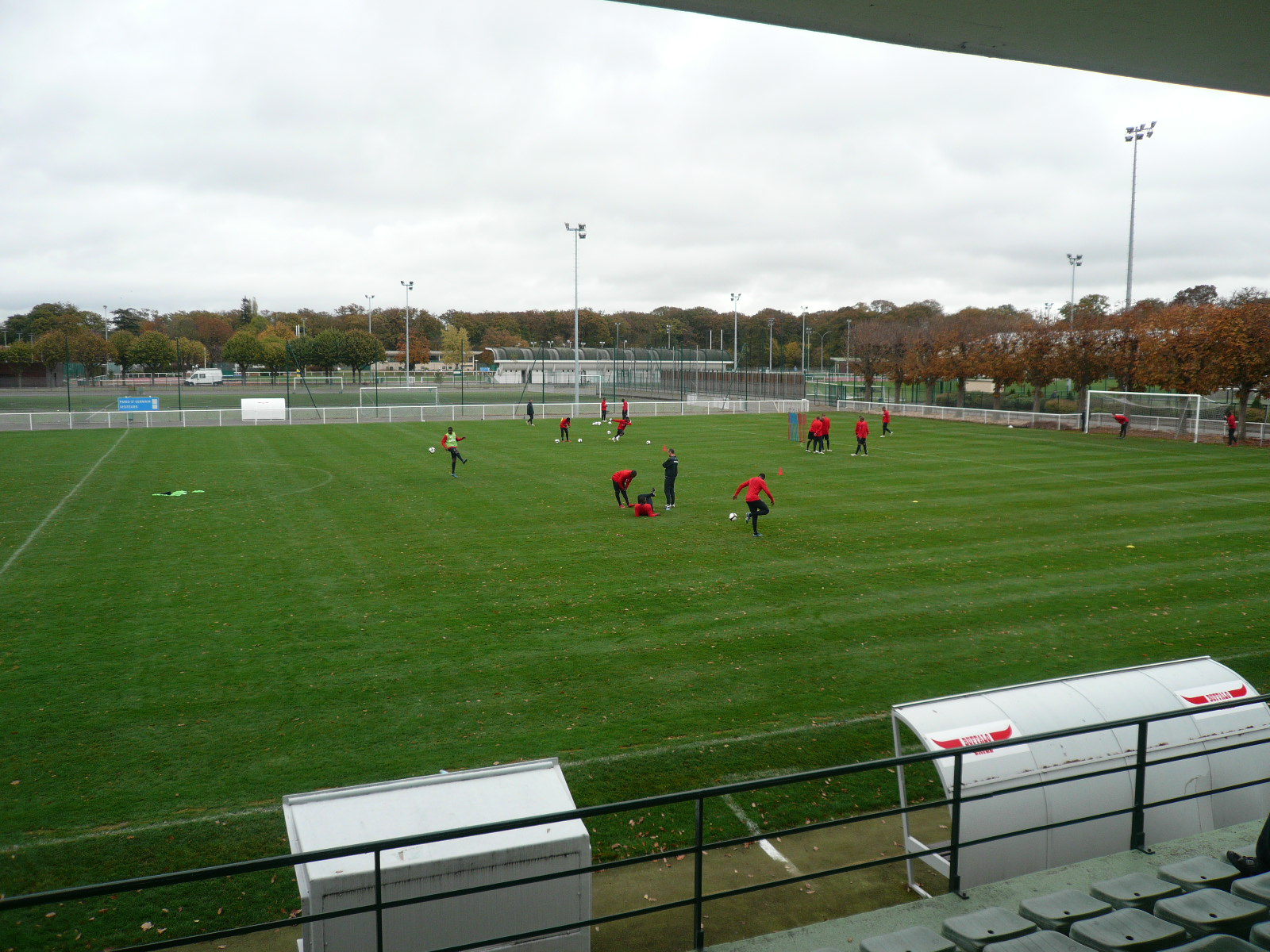
Stade Georges Lefèvre

General Delegate	(France) Pierre Noguès
General Manager	(France) Brigitte Henriques
Academy Director	(France) Laure Lepailleur
Administrative Secretariat	(France) Irène Desperak, Jessica Flavigny
Sporting Director	(France) Sophie Perrichon
Ground (capacity and dimensions)	Stade Georges Lefèvre (3,500 / -)

Source: PSG.fr

== Division 1 Féminine ==
Paris Saint-Germain suffered a crushing defeat to Montpellier only alleviated by Laure Lepailleur's consolation goal. Élise Bussaglia's strike after a defensive error was enough to claim PSG's first victory of the season in a highly contested match against Yzeure. "Les Parisiennes" first match at home ended with a win over Rodez as Kátia, PSG's star signing, scored in her debut at the Stade Georges Lefèvre. Paris claimed all three points away to Saint-Étienne thanks to Élise Bussaglia's free kick which became her third goal of the season. PSG Ladies followed the steps of their male associates and defeated Toulouse at the Camp des Loges thanks to a fourth consecutive goal in four matches from Élise Bussaglia. Paris Saint-Germain continued their good run defeating Hénin-Beaumont by a margin of four goals. "Les Rouge-et-Bleu" recorded an impressive fourth consecutive victory and climbed into the podium, tied with Montpellier and just three points from leaders Lyon.

Brazilian star Kátia opened the score for Paris Saint-Germain against Saint-Brieuc as Camillo Vaz's ladies recorded their sixth consecutive victory and consolidated their place in the podium. "Les Parisiennes" returned to action for their Week 15 match against Toulouse which was brought forward. PSG took the lead through Charlotte Lozè early in the first half before Kátia, Élise Bussaglia and Candice Prévost signed three more goals as they recorded a second victory over Toulouse. Caroline Pizzala and Sabrina Delannoy found the net as the capital club came from behind to beat Yzeure. PSG claimed all three points away to Rodez thanks to Élise Bussaglia's seventh goal of the season after a smoothly conducted team work. Paris fell to their second defeat of the season as leaders Lyon came from behind at the Stade Georges Lefèvre. Brazilian striker Kátia scored PSG's goal in a wondrous display. Élise Bussaglia's goal from the penalty spot against Saint-Étienne earned Paris a spot in the podium as they reached third in the Division 1 Féminine. PSG withstood the French champion during the first half, but Lyon dominated an extremely defensive capital side which conceded three goals in the second period. PSG's Champions League hopes suffered a major blow as Hénin-Beaumont came from behind to win at the Camp des Loges.

Élise Bussaglia scored in each half to defeat Le Mans and keep Paris Saint-Germain in the hunt for the European Cup. Kátia's brace and a superb header from Sabrina Delannoy against Saint-Brieuc allowed Paris to go level with Montpellier in second place. Kátia's ninth Division 1 goal of the season got the ball rolling for PSG as they ran out home winners over arch-rivals Juvisy to stand second in the table. Kátia took her tally to 10 Division 1 strikes as the Brazilian struck to keep Paris in the race for Champions League football with a win over La Roche. Kátia notched her club-leading 11th Division 1 goal of the season as PSG enjoyed a home win over Le Mans. Brazilian star Kátia produced a virtuoso performance crowned by two goals as Paris condemned La Roche to a fifth defeat in five Division 1 games. Sabrina Delannoy struck her 5th goal of the season from the penalty spot as PSG qualified to the Champions League for the first time in their history with a decisive victory over second-placed Montpellier. Élise Bussaglia confirmed her continuing ascendancy in the French game by collecting the coveted Division 1 Player of the Year award.

=== League table ===
Pos	Team	Pld	W	D	L	GF	GA	GD	Pts	Qualification or relegation
1	Lyon (C, Q)	22	22	0	0	106	6	+100	88	Qualification for Women's Champions League
2	Paris Saint-Germain (Q)	22	17	1	4	43	16	+27	74	Qualification for Women's Champions League
3	Montpellier	22	16	1	5	54	13	+41	71	
4	Juvisy	22	15	3	4	62	30	+32	70	
5	Saint-Étienne	22	11	1	10	25	27	−2	56	

Source: French Football Federation
Rules for classification: 1st points; 2nd head-to-head goal difference; 3rd total goal difference
(C) Champions; (Q) Qualified for the phase indicated

=== Results summary ===
Overall								Home						Away					
Pld	W	D	L	GF	GA	GD	Pts	W	D	L	GF	GA	GD	W	D	L	GF	GA	GD
22	17	1	4	43	16	+27	52	9	0	2	20	7	+13	8	1	2	23	9	+14

Source: Footofeminin

=== Results by round ===
Round	1	2	3	4	5	6	7	8	9	10	11	12	13	14	15	16	17	18	19	20	21	22
Ground	A	A	H	A	H	A	H	A	H	A	H	H	A	H	A	H	A	H	A	H	A	H
Result	L	W	W	W	W	W	W	D	L	W	W	W	W	W	W	L	W	W	L	W	W	W
Position	9	6	5	4	3	3	3	2	3	3	2	4	4	3	4	4	3	3	4	3	3	2

Source: Footofeminin
A = Away; H = Home; W = Win; D = Draw; L = Loss

Match Results
Date	Opponents	H / A	Result	Scorers	Attendance	Position	Referee
2010
5 September	Montpellier	A	3–1	Lepailleur 70'	250	8th	(Provence-Alpes-Côte d'Azur) Lugdivine Cinquini
19 September	Yzeure	A	0–1	Bussaglia 76'	250	▲6th	(Île-de-France) Karine Lasalle
26 September	Rodez	H	3–0	Houara 10', Kátia 40', Bussaglia 55'	200	▲5th	(France) Marie-Laure Taesch
10 October	Saint-Étienne	A	0–1	Bussaglia 67'	150	▲4th	(Provence-Alpes-Côte d'Azur) Lugdivine Cinquini
17 October	Toulouse	H	1–0	Bussaglia 30'	250	▲3rd	(Lorraine) Nathalie Mittelbronn
31 October	Hénin-Beaumont	A	0–4	Kátia 7', Houara 31', Lozè 45', Ayachi 90+1'	250	3rd	(Rhône-Alpes) Jennifer Maubacq
7 November	Saint-Brieuc	H	3–0	Kátia 23', Pizzala 45', Delannoy 60'	100	3rd	(Nord-Pas-de-Calais) Cindy Gosselin
28 November	Toulouse	A	1–4	Lozè 17', Kátia 49', Bussaglia 63', Prévost 70'	70	3rd	(Languedoc-Roussillon) Dorothée Ily
15 December	Juvisy	A	0–0		70	▲2nd	(France) Stéphanie Frappart
2011
19 January	Lyon	H	1–2	Kátia 50'	250	▼3rd	(Rhône-Alpes) Nathalie Le Breton
26 February	Le Mans	A	1–2	Bussaglia 39', 52'	150	3rd	(Rhône-Alpes) Jennifer Maubacq
9 April	La Roche	H	2–0	Rubio 14', Kátia 45'	200	3rd	(France) Florent Mathis
9 January	Yzeure	H	2–1	Pizzala 41', Delannoy 75'	150	3rd	(Île-de-France) Karine Lasalle
16 January	Rodez	A	0–1	Bussaglia 40'	300	3rd	(Languedoc-Roussillon) Dorothée Ily
23 January	Saint-Étienne	H	1–0	Bussaglia 22' (pen.)	150	3rd	(France) Séverine Craipeau
13 February	Hénin-Beaumont	H	1–2	Bussaglia 33'	250	3rd	(Brittany) Élodie Coppola
20 March	Saint-Brieuc	A	0–3	Kátia 16', 36', Delannoy 27'	100	3rd	(France) Séverine Craipeau
27 March	Juvisy	H	3–1	Pizzala 20', Kátia 44', Houara 75'	400	▲2nd	(Lorraine) Nathalie Mittelbronn
6 February	Lyon	A	3–0		200	▼3rd	(Provence-Alpes-Côte d'Azur) Noëlle Robin
24 April	Le Mans	H	2–1	Kátia 22', Thomas 82'	250	3rd	(Île-de-France) Karine Lasalle
15 May	La Roche	A	1–6	Kátia 42', 82', Houara 46', Prévost 54', Delannoy 58' (pen.), Coton-Pélagie 66' (pen.)	150	3rd	(Centre-Val de Loire) Gwendoline Defente
29 May	Montpellier	H	1–0	Delannoy 88' (pen.)	500	▲2nd	(Nord-Pas-de-Calais) Cindy Gosselin

== Challenge de France ==
Paris Saint-Germain entered the 2010–11 Challenge de France season as defending champions having won the title last season in a one-sided Final against Montpellier at the Stade Robert Bobin. A masterful display saw PSG claim their first major title and most prestigious honour to date. Division 1 sides entered the draw for the Second Round and Paris Saint-Germain began their defence of the trophy visiting Division 2 side Issy. Zohra Ayachi struck a hat-trick as Challenge de France holders PSG cruised to victory in Issy. Camillo Vaz's ladies stormed home as they scored a record ten goals against their weak opponents to secure a place in the last-32. Paris Saint-Germain began their defence of the trophy by putting ten past Issy, and then faced a trip to Alsace to play Vendenheim of the second division. The French Football Federation validated the appeal to replace the Challenge de France Féminin for the Coupe de France Féminine from the 2011–12 season onwards. A Joanna Schwartz strike midway through the second half took Vendenheim into the last-16 at the expense of Paris Saint-Germain after a nervy evening at the Stade Waldeck.

Date	Round	Opponents	H / A	Result	Scorer(s)	Attendance	Referee
2011
30 January	Second Round	Issy	A	0 – 10	Lozè 14', 53', Bussaglia 21', Lepailleur 28', ? 31' (o.g.), Prévost 32', Ayachi 35', 56', 85', Boulleau 51'		(France) Yannick Tenesi
20 February	Round of 32	Vendenheim	A	1 – 0		300	(France) Marie-Laure Taesch

== Reserves and academy ==
Paris Saint-Germain
2010–11 season
- DH Île-de-France: Champions
- Challenge National Féminine U-19: Groupe A, 2nd

PSG B Manager	(France) Pierre-Yves Bodineau
U-19 Manager	(France) Julien Rigoux
Football School	(France) Léa Rubio, Nora Coton-Pélagie
Head Doctors	(France) Dr. N'Guyen, Stéphane Cascua
Physical Trainer	(France) Denis Lefebve
Physiotherapist	(France) Cédric Dupuis
Goalkeeping Coach	(France) Jean Paul Plaire
Ground (capacity and dimensions)	Stade Georges Lefèvre (3,500 / -)

Source: PSG.fr

PSG B
Date	Opponents	H / A	Result	Scorer(s)	Attendance	Position	Referee
Phase 1 - Group A
2010
25 September	Domont	H	8 – 2	Dorival, Thebaud, Corso (x2), Lozè (x2), Conforti (x2)		2nd	
2 October	Paris CA	A	1 – 7	Rouaud, Corso, Conforti (x2), Okpo (x3)		▲1st	
9 October	Blanc-Mesnil	H	16 – 0	Okpo (x4), Pradier, Coton-Pélagie, Conforti (x4), Lozè (x5), ?		1st	
16 October	Bagneux	A	0 – 1	Conforti		1st	
6 November	Tremblay	A	1 – 5	Kaabachi, Legrand, Okpo (x3)		1st	
13 November	Bagneux	H	0 – 0			1st	
20 November	Paris CA	H	3 – 2	Maknoun, Kaabachi, Okpo		1st	
2011
15 January	Blanc-Mesnil	A	0 – 11	Corso, Mahfoud, Bayle (x2), Prévost (x2), Conforti (x4), ?		1st	
22 January	Domont	A	0 – 2	Dellas 13', Bafuanikisa 84'		1st	
12 February	Tremblay	H	0 – 1			1st	
Phase 2 - Challenge DH
12 March	Juvisy	H	6 – 1	Lozè, Corso, Bayle, Okpo, ?, ?		1st	
19 March	Bagneux	A	1 – 9	Corso (x2), Bayle, Okpo (x2), Lozè (x3), ?		1st	
26 March	Tremblay	A	3 – 4	Corso, Pinto, Lozè, ?		1st	
2 April	Val d'Orge	H	6 – 0	Thomas (x3), Conforti, Okpo, Lozè		1st	
30 April	Paris CA	A	2 – 4	Traoré, Kervroedan, Lozè, Okpo		1st	
7 May	Juvisy	A	1 – 3	Conforti (x2), Pinto		1st	
14 May	Bagneux	H	11 – 0	Conforti (x4), Hamidouche, Larroude, Lozè (x5)		1st	
21 May	Tremblay	H	5 – 1	Bayle, Lozè, Okpo (x2), Ayachi		1st	
28 May	Val d'Orge	A	5 – 6	Conforti, Poulain, Corso, Kaabachi (x2), ?		1st	
4 June	Paris CA	H	0 – 0			1st	

U-19
Date	Opponents	H / A	Result	Scorer(s)	Attendance	Position	Referee
2010
26 September	Vendenheim	H	1 – 2	Kervroedan 70'		7th	(France) Mathieu Renaud
17 October	Hénin-Beaumont	A	4 – 9	Maknoun 1', 60', Guerrab 3', 11', Kervroedan 44', 48', 56', Friard 88', Mahfoud 90+1'		▲4th	(France) Amandine Desrumaux
24 October	Montigny	H	3 – 0	Friard 44', Maknoun 60', 78'		4th	(France) Thomas Chaumeron
14 November	Le Mans	A	2 – 3	Guerrab 36', Le Garrec 48', Maknoun 66'		▲3rd	(France) Cédric Avignon
28 November	Juvisy	H	3 – 0	Kaabachi 51', Friard 63', Maknoun 76'		▲1st	(France) Kévin Garnier
2011
30 January	Compiègne	A	0 – 5	Guerrab 38', Odini 51', Friard 60', 88', Kaabachi 83'		1st	(France) Lilia Achiche Garnier
16 January	Saint-Brieuc	A	1 – 5	Maknoun 12', Guerrab 16', 52', 87', Kervroedan 81'		1st	(France) Emilie Giraud
23 January	Hénin-Beaumont	H	1 – 2	Kaabachi 19' (pen.)		1st	(France) Noureddin Guini
6 February	Montigny	A	0 – 0			▼2nd	(France) Tiago Tinoco
13 February	Le Mans	H	2 – 0	Guerrab 15', Flores Silvaje 88'		▲1st	(France) Tiago Tinoco
20 March	Juvisy	A	0 – 0			1st	(France) Pascal Boumendil
27 March	Compiègne	H	8 – 1	Kervroedan 26', 66', Guerrab 42', Maknoun 50', 67', 82', Kaabachi 60', Flores Silvaje 84'		1st	(France) Ahmed Guettoufi
17 April	Saint-Brieuc	H	5 – 0	Reguengo 30', 62', Thomas 42', 70', 82'		1st	(France) Karim Amejal
8 May	Vendenheim	A	1 – 0			▼2nd	(France) Morgane Zimmer
