= 2008–09 Paris Saint-Germain FC (women) season =

French football club season

Paris Saint-Germain
Season 2008–09
Manager	(France) Éric Leroy
President	(France) Alain Gobert
Division 1 Féminine	8th
Challenge de France	Round of 32
Season Top Goalscorer	(France) Candice Prévost (7)
Season Top Assister (3)	(France) Stéphanie Hoffele (France) Caroline Pizzala
Highest Home Attendance	200 vs Montpellier (10 May 2009)
Lowest Home Attendance	70 vs Soyaux (1 March 2009)
$\leftarrow$ Previous season 2007–08
$\rightarrow$ Next season 2009–10

The 2008–09 season was French football club Paris Saint-Germain's 10th season in Division 1 Féminine and their 8th consecutive season in the top division of French football. PSG was managed by Éric Leroy - in his second season since replacing Cyril Combettes. The club was chaired by Alain Gobert. PSG was present in the 2008–09 Division 1 Féminine and the 2008–09 Challenge de France. Paris Saint-Germain reached the target set by the club last season after finishing 5th. Additionally, the fact that PSG became Challenge de France runners-up, the club's biggest honour to date, after being defeated by Olympique Lyonnais in the Final at the Stade de France set the bar even higher for the capital club. As seen in Éric Leroy's words, PSG started the campaign with the prospect of matching last season's heights by finishing between the first four in the league and pulling something off in the Challenge de France:

Do as well as last season! To do this, I have a more comprehensive workforce with 22 girls at my disposal to work. The backbone of the group stayed unchanged, while some experienced new players will help us. My team is still young, but I think this season will be interesting.

— Éric Leroy, 20 August 2008

== Squad ==
French teams are limited to four players without EU citizenship. The squad list includes only the principal nationality of each player; several non-European players on the squad have dual citizenship with an EU country. Also, players from the ACP countries—countries in Africa, the Caribbean, and the Pacific that are signatories to the Cotonou Agreement—are not counted against non-EU quotas due to the Kolpak ruling. Note: Flags indicate national team as defined under FIFA eligibility rules; some limited exceptions apply. Players may hold more than one non-FIFA nationality.

No.	Pos.	Nation	Player
1	GK	FRA	Bérangère Sapowicz
3	DF	FRA	Laure Boulleau
4	DF	FRA	Laure Lepailleur
5	DF	FRA	Sabrina Delannoy
6	MF	FRA	Caroline Pizzala
12	DF	FRA	Nonna Debonne
14	MF	FRA	Stéphanie Hoffele
15	MF	FRA	Nora Coton-Pélagie
16	DF	FRA	Stéphanie Legrand
18	FW	FRA	Candice Prévost
19	DF	FRA	Gwenaëlle Pelé
21	MF	FRA	Sophie Perrichon

No.	Pos.	Nation	Player
22	DF	FRA	Félicité Hamidouche
23	DF	FRA	Émilie L'Huillier
24	FW	FRA	Ingrid Boyeldieu
—	FW	FRA	Cindy Thomas
—	MF	FRA	Coralie Barbosa
—	MF	FRA	Vanessa Ordonez
—	MF	FRA	Mériame Ben Abdelwahab
—	MF	FRA	Claire Ficadière
—	MF	FRA	Madina Frarma
—	FW	FRA	Ella Kaabachi
—	FW	FRA	Élodie Monteiro

== Board and staff ==
Manager	(France) Éric Leroy
Goalkeeping Coach	(France) Jean Paul Plaire
Physical Trainer	(France) Denis Lefebve
Head Doctors	(France) Dr. N'Guyen, Stéphane Cascua
Physiotherapists	(France) Cédric Dupuis

Updated to match played 18 September
Source: PSG.fr

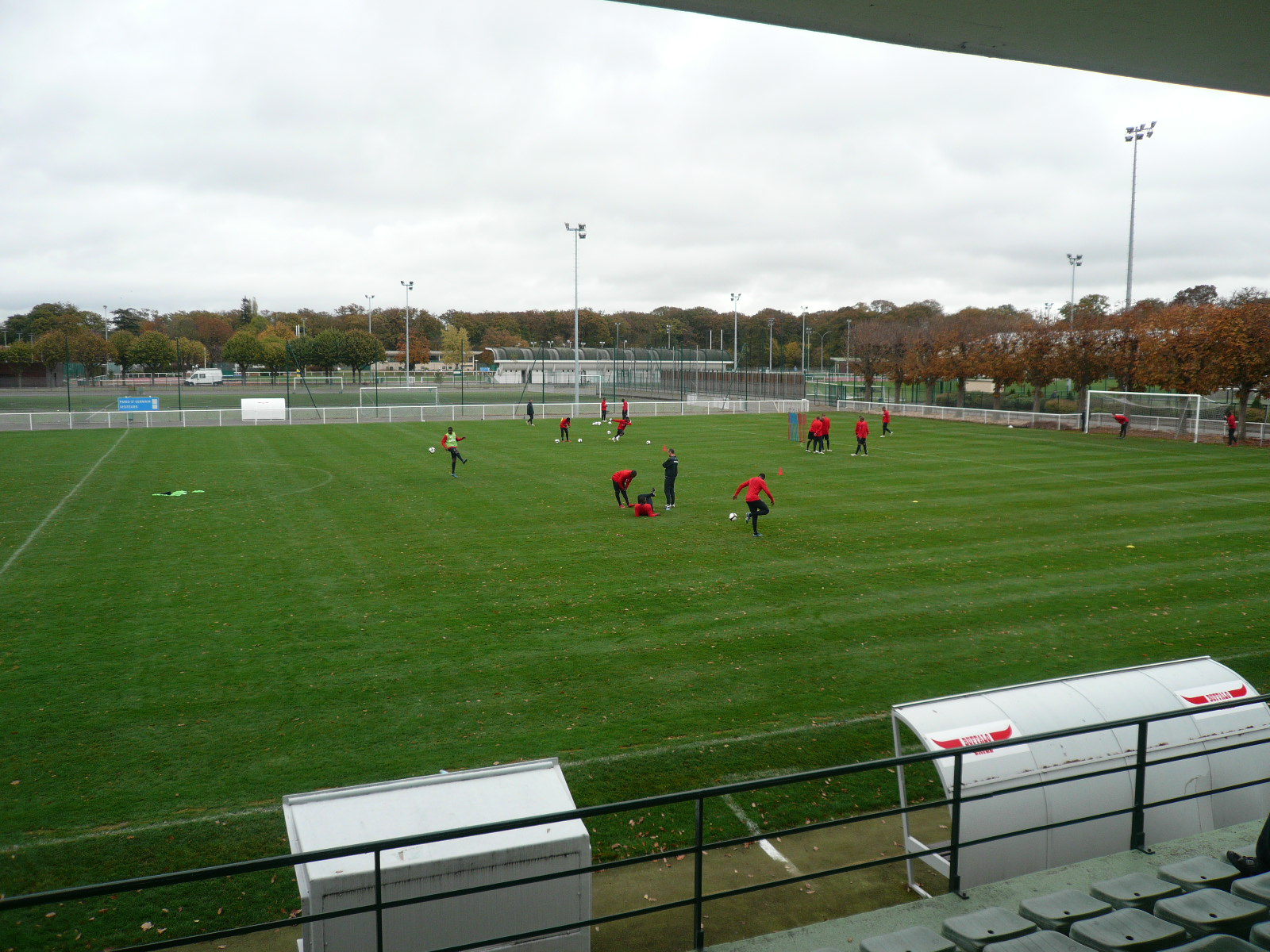
Stade Georges Lefèvre

President	(France) Alain Gobert
General Manager	(France) Brigitte Henriques
Academy Director	(France) Laure Lepailleur
Administrative Secretariat	(France) Irène Desperak
Sporting Director	(France) Sophie Perrichon
Ground (capacity and dimensions)	Stade Georges Lefèvre (3,500 / -)

Updated to match played 18 September
Source: PSG.fr

== Division 1 Féminine ==
Having defeated Paris Saint-Germain in last season's Challenge de France final with three unanswered goals, defending league and cup champions Olympique Lyonnais dominated an extremely defensive capital side which had to wait until stoppage time to record their only shot of the match. After the break, "Les Parisiennes" scored twice in two minutes and Vendenheim never recovered, conceding two more late in the match as Ingrid Boyeldieu grabbed a brace. Goals in each half from Sophie Perrichon and Nora Coton-Pélagie turn the tables on a combative Yzeure side that managed to rescue a point and could have won it in the last-gasp. Juvisy had the chance to get revenge as Paris Saint-Germain defeated them for the first time in six years and left them out of the 2008 Challenge de France Final. Juvisy got their sweet revenge and climbed to second place after a highly contested match decided by two consecutive goals from the visitors in the dying stages. PSG produced a dominant display away to Soyaux which both Ingrid Boyeldieu and Candice Prévost seized to seal the capital's victory. PSG and Saint-Étienne ended with a scoreless draw.

Ingrid Boyeldieu's strike midway through the first half equalized the score, but only served as consolation for the capital club against a Condé side which dominated the match from start to finish. In the absence of nine injured players, Paris Saint-Germain showed a seductive game but could not get the victory over Hénin-Beaumont at the Camp des Loges. Under the watchful eye of France manager Bruno Bini, it seemed "Les Parisiennes" were getting back on track after Ingrid Boyeldieu opened the score. Just a minute a later the visitors equalized before taking the lead. Paris Saint-Germain, however, didn't gave up and Boyeldieu completed her brace. Hénin-Beaumont responded quickly again and Rachel Saïdi netted a brace. After the break, Madina Frarma reduced the advantage and staged a failed comeback as Hénin-Beaumont killed off any remaining hope for Paris Saint-Germain. Paris Saint-Germain could not be separated from Saint-Brieuc as both sides were condemned to a scoreless draw. Montpellier scored three times as Paris Saint-Germain finished 2008 one point from relegation and stretched their negative run to five matches without victory.

Paris Saint-Germain returned to winning ways with a crushing victory against Yzeure thanks to Caroline Pizzala's hat-trick. "Les Parisiennes" recorded their first back-to-back victories after they went past a Toulouse side thanks to second-half goals from Stéphanie Hoffele and Laure Lepailleur. Candice Prévost scored an amazing 20-yard shot to give Paris the lead in the derby. Juvisy, however, took the derby honours thanks to Laëtitia Tonazzi's brace. PSG bounced back with a hard-earned victory over Soyaux thanks to Nonna Debonne's strike. "Les Verts" claimed victory and climbed over PSG in the standings to reach safety in a match which saw Saint-Étienne players Jessica Houara and Kheira Hamraoui being sent-off after an altercation. Paris Saint-Germain made the trip to Vendenheim with just twelve players and could only save a point thanks to Candice Prévost's fourth goal of the season. During the final minutes of the match, "Les Parisiennes" were forced to play with ten players as an injured Élodie Monteiro, who had to left the field, couldn't be replaced after the capital club had already introduced Laure Boulleau, their only replacement available.

Paris Saint-Germain returned to winning days inspired by Cindy Thomas who netted a hat-trick and laid on a fourth to condemn Condé to a sixth consecutive defeat. PSG, however, lost against a Hénin-Beaumont side which reached safety after being in relegation prior to the encounter. Paris Saint-Germain took the lead through Nora Coton-Pélagie's superb free kick, but "Les Parisiennes" were condemned to a draw against Saint-Brieuc at the Camp des Loges. After grabbing the lead thanks to Candice Prévost, it took Montpellier just three minutes to equalize. PSG defeated Toulouse by the same score after a rampant two minutes, which saw strikes from Candice Prévost and Cindy Thomas, sealed the victory. PSG withstood the French champion during the first half, but Lyon dominated an extremely defensive capital side which conceded two goals in the second period. After a disappointing campaign marked by numerous injuries and where Paris Saint-Germain finished eighth and was prematurely eliminated from the Challenge de France, Éric Leroy handed over the job to manager Camillo Vaz and assistant coach Karine Noilhan in June 2009.

=== League table ===
Pos	Club	Pld	W	D	L	F	A	GD	Pts	Notes
6	Saint-Brieuc	22	8	4	10	32	53	-21	50
7	Saint-Étienne	22	7	6	9	40	46	-6	49
8	Paris Saint-Germain	22	7	6	9	29	30	-1	49
9	Toulouse	22	7	5	10	34	46	-12	48
10	Soyaux	22	5	4	13	22	51	-29	41

=== Results summary ===
Overall								Home						Away					
Pld	W	D	L	GF	GA	GD	Pts	W	D	L	GF	GA	GD	W	D	L	GF	GA	GD
22	7	6	9	29	30	−1	27	5	3	3	19	11	+8	2	3	6	10	19	−9

Source: Footofeminin

=== Results by round ===
Round	1	2	3	4	5	6	7	8	9	10	11	12	13	14	15	16	17	18	19	20	21	22
Ground	A	H	A	H	A	H	A	H	A	A	H	A	H	A	H	A	H	A	H	H	A	H
Result	L	W	D	L	W	D	L	L	D	L	W	D	W	L	W	L	W	L	D	D	W	L
Position	10	6	6	8	7	6	8	9	10	10	7	7	6	6	6	7	6	6	7	7	5	8

Source: Footofeminin
A = Away; H = Home; W = Win; D = Draw; L = Loss

Match Results

Date	Opponents	H / A	Result	Scorers	Attendance	Position	Referee
2008
23 August	Lyon	A	2 – 0		150	10th	(Provence-Alpes-Côte d'Azur) Aurélie Efe
31 August	Vendenheim	H	4 – 0	Boyeldieu 51', 70', Frarma 53', Pizzala 79'	120	▲6th	(Rhône-Alpes) Solenne Bartnik
7 September	Yzeure	A	2 – 2	Perrichon 30', Coton-Pélagie 52'	200	6th	(France) Guillaume Coulon
14 September	Juvisy	H	0 – 2		200	▼8th	(Île-de-France) Karine Lasalle
21 September	Soyaux	A	0 – 2	Boyeldieu 31', Prévost 60'	300	▲7th	(Brittany) Élodie Coppola
5 October	Saint-Étienne	H	0 – 0		100	▲6th	(Alsace) Sabrina Himber
12 October	Condé	A	5 – 1	Boyeldieu 36'	150	▼8th	(Nord-Pas-de-Calais) Cindy Gosselin
19 October	Hénin-Beaumont	H	3 – 5	Boyeldieu 4', 22', Frarma 70'	200	▼9th	(Rhône-Alpes) Solenne Bartnik
2 November	Saint-Brieuc	A	0 – 0		100	▼10th	(Provence-Alpes-Côte d'Azur) Noëlle Robin
9 November	Montpellier	A	3 – 1	Prévost 69'	200	10th	(Provence-Alpes-Côte d'Azur) Lugdivine Cinquini
2009
1 February	Toulouse	H	2 – 0	Hoffele 52', Lepailleur 76'	150	▲7th	(Nord-Pas-de-Calais) Cindy Gosselin
29 March	Vendenheim	A	1 – 1	Prévost 63'	100	7th	(Rhône-Alpes) Solenne Bartnik
25 January	Yzeure	H	3 – 0	Pizzala	80	▲6th	(Alsace) Sabrina Himber
8 February	Juvisy	A	2 – 1	Prévost 36'	200	6th	(Brittany) Élodie Coppola
1 March	Soyaux	H	1 – 0	Debonne 64'	70	6th	(Alsace) Sabrina Himber
22 March	Saint-Étienne	A	2 – 0		150	▼7th	(Languedoc-Roussillon) Dorothée Ily
5 April	Condé	H	4 – 0	Thomas 7', 69', 85', Prévost 22'	100	▲6th	(Alsace) Sabrina Himber
18 April	Hénin-Beaumont	A	2 – 0		70	6th	(France) Delphine Lenoir
3 May	Saint-Brieuc	H	1 – 1	Coton-Pélagie 21'	100	▼7th	(Île-de-France) Karine Lasalle
10 May	Montpellier	H	1 – 1	Prévost 53'	200	7th	(Lorraine) Nathalie Mittelbronn
24 May	Toulouse	A	0 – 2	Prévost 55', Thomas 57'	250	▲5th	(Languedoc-Roussillon) Dorothée Ily
31 May	Lyon	H	0 – 2		150	▼8th	(Île-de-France) Karine Lasalle

== Challenge de France ==
Paris Saint-Germain entered the 2008–09 Challenge de France season having reached the final last season where they fell to a 0-3 defeat against Olympique Lyonnais. Paris Saint-Germain entered the competition during the Round of 32 phase. The last-32 were drawn and "Les Parisiennes" were pitted against second tier Le Mans. On paper, Paris Saint-Germain was favourite to beat D2 side Le Mans, however they disappointed as the capital club crashed out of the last-32 after being defeated on penalties. Le Mans opened the hostilities through Cindy Dufeu's powerful shot and Paris Saint-Germain reacted immediately, taking control of the game and creating a host of chances which Laura Guilleux, the host's goalkeeper, managed to deflect. After the break, Nora Coton-Pélagie took advantage of a defensive error and scored the equalizer for "Les Rouge-et-Bleu", which could have won the match if it wasn't for Guilleux's save in a hand-to-hand against Cindy Thomas. With the final whistle, the penalties had to decide the fate of the game and eventual runners-up Le Mans came out victorious from the shootout as they left Paris Saint-Germain empty handed.

Match Results

Date	Round	Opponents	H / A	Result	Scorers	Attendance	Referee
2009
15 February	Round of 32	Le Mans	A	1 – 1; 4–3 p.	Coton-Pélagie 70'	100	(France) Stéphane Etaix
