= 2010 Challenge de France final =

- Event: 2009–10 Challenge de France
| Paris Saint-Germain | Montpellier |
| D1 Féminine | D1 Féminine |
| 5 | 0 |
- Date: 23 May 2010
- Venue: Stade Robert Bobin, Bondoufle
- Referee: Sabine Bonnin (Ligue du Centre)

The 2010 Challenge de France final was the 9th final of France's female cup competition. The final took place on 23 May 2010 at the Stade Robert Bobin in Bondoufle, a commune in the Île-de-France region. The match was contested between Paris Saint-Germain and Montpellier with the latter club coming in as defending champions.

Paris Saint-Germain captured their first Challenge de France title by defeating Montpellier 5–0. Montpellier were attempting to become the third club to defend their Challenge de France title having already done it once before. The 5–0 scoreline gap is the largest in the cup's young history. It is also the first time in French football history that both the male and female sections of a club occupy both the country's national cups. The male section of Paris Saint-Germain won the Coupe de France on 1 May.

== Match ==
=== Details ===
23 May 2010
18:30 CET

| Paris SG | 5 – 0 | Montpellier |
|---|---|---|
| Boyeldieu 19'; Pizzala 54', 85'; Coton-Pélagie 68'; Bussaglia 71' | Report |

Stade Robert Bobin, Bondoufle
Attendance: 4,200
Referee: Sabine Bonnin (Ligue du Centre)

| Paris SG | Montpellier |

Paris SG:
| GK | 1 | (France) Bérangère Sapowicz |
| RB | 2 | (France) Julie Soyer |
| CB | 5 | (France) Sabrina Delannoy (c) |
| CB | 4 | (France) Nonna Debonne |
| LB | 3 | (France) Laure Boulleau |
| CM | 6 | (France) Caroline Pizzala |
| CM | 11 | (France) Élise Bussaglia |
| CM | 7 | (France) Jessica Houara |
| AM | 10 | (France) Nora Coton-Pélagie | | (substituted off) 72' |
| FW | 8 | (France) Candice Prévost | | (substituted off) 90' |
| FW | 9 | (France) Ingrid Boyeldieu | | (substituted off) 58' |
Substitutes:
| GK | 16 | (France) Marie-Océane Bayol |
| DF | 12 | (France) Gwenaëlle Pelé | | (substituted in) 72' |
| FW | 13 | (France) Zohra Ayachi | | (substituted in) 58' |
| DF | 14 | (France) Émilie L'Huillier |
| MF | 15 | (France) Stéphanie Legrand | (yellow card) 90' | (substituted in) 90' |
Manager:
(France) Camille Vaz

MONTPELLIER:
| GK | 1 | (France) Céline Deville |
| RB | 2 | (France) Ludivine Diguelman |
| CB | 5 | (France) Sabrina Viguier (c) |
| CB | 6 | (France) Faustine Roux | (substituted off) 76' |
| LB | 3 | (France) Cynthia Viani |
| CM | 4 | (France) Lalia Dali | (substituted off) 46' |
| CM | 8 | (France) Mélissa Plaza |
| RM | 10 | (France) Viviane Asseyi |
| LM | 7 | (France) Marine Pervier | (substituted off) 46' |
| FW | 11 | (France) Hoda Lattaf |
| FW | 9 | (France) Marie-Laure Delie |
Substitutes:
| GK | 16 | (France) Solène Durand |
| FW | 12 | (Algeria) Nora Hamou Maamar | (substituted in) 46' |
| MF | 13 | (France) Charlotte Lozè | (substituted in) 46' |
| DF | 14 | (France) Delphine Blanc | (substituted in) 76' |
| DF | 15 | (France) Marine Cacciaguerra |
Manager:
(France) Sarah M'Barek

MATCH OFFICIALS

- Assistant referees:
  - Élodie Coppola (Ligue de Bretagne)
  - Audrey Guerlin (Ligue de Champagne-Ardenne)
- Fourth official: Karine Lasalle (Ligue d'Île-de-France)

MATCH RULES

- 90 minutes.
- Penalty shoot-out if scores still level after 90 minutes.
- Five named substitutes.
- Maximum of three substitutions.
