= Lara Dickenmann =

Swiss footballer (born 1985)

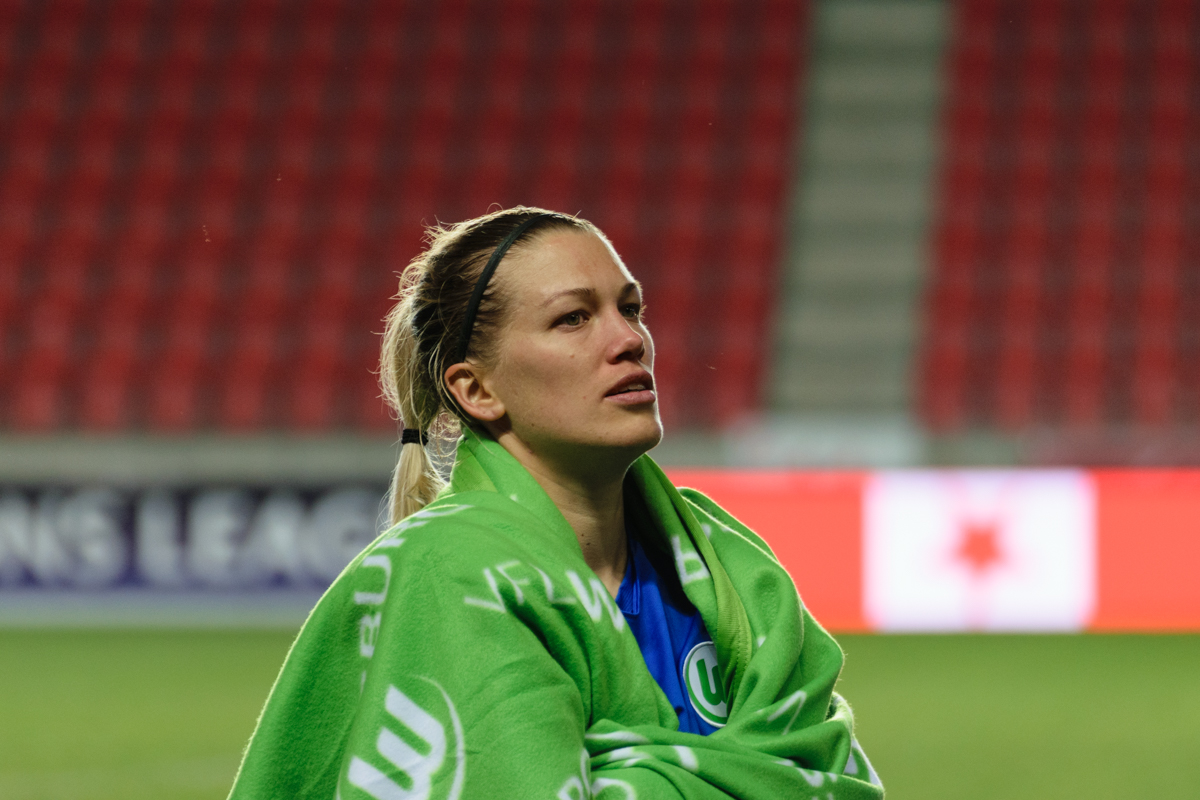
- Dickenmann with VfL Wolfsburg in 2018

Personal information
- Full name: Lara Joy Dickenmann
- Date of birth: 27 November 1985 (age 40)
- Place of birth: Kriens, Switzerland
- Height: 5 ft 5 in (1.65 m)
- Positions: Midfielder; full-back

Youth career
- 1993–2000: SC Kriens
- 2000–2004: DFC Sursee

College career
Years	Team	Apps	(Gls)
2004–2007	Ohio State Buckeyes		

Senior career*
Years	Team	Apps	(Gls)
2006	New Jersey Wildcats	8	(8)
2007	Jersey Sky Blue	11	(18)
2008–2009	FC Zürich		
2009–2015	Lyon	117	(57)
2015–2021	VfL Wolfsburg	81	(12)
2019	VfL Wolfsburg II	1	(0)

International career
2002–2003	Switzerland U18	3	(0)
2002–2004	Switzerland U19	18	(7)
2002–2018	Switzerland	135	(53)
- * Club domestic league appearances and goals

Lara Joy Dickenmann (born 27 November 1985) is a Swiss former footballer who played as a midfielder or full-back. She played for German club VfL Wolfsburg and French club Olympique Lyonnais. She is a versatile footballer who can play as a midfielder or a full-back on either side of the field. She formerly played at the college level for the Ohio State University, breaking many records and earning several player honors. In 2008, Dickenmann left the university and joined D1 Féminine club Lyon.

Dickenmann was also a member of the Switzerland women's national football team. She starred for the national team at youth level and made her senior debut in August 2002 at the age of 16 against France, scoring in a 2–1 defeat.

== Career ==
=== Youth career ===
Dickenmann was born in the town of Kriens located in the Canton of Lucerne. She began her career with the boys' section of local outfit SC Kriens spending seven years at the club. In 2000, she joined DFC Sursee. Dickenmann gained notice for her performance with the national team's youth sides, helping the Swiss U-19 team reach the 2002 and 2004 UEFA Women's Under-19 Championship and winning three league championships and two league cups with Sursee. For her efforts during the 2003–04 season, Dickenmann was named the Swiss Player of the Year.

=== Collegiate career ===
In 2004, Dickenmann decided to move to the United States of America to play college soccer at the Ohio State University. In her freshman season, she was named the Big Ten Freshman of the Year, as well as the nation's Freshman of the Year by numerous publications. She was also deemed a second-team All-American by the NSCAA. Dickenmann established single-season records for OSU in goals scored (13) and assisted on (12) helping Ohio State reach the Elite 8 in the NCAA national tournament.

In her sophomore season, due to earning call ups to the Swiss national team, Dickenmann missed significant playing time. However, she still earned all-Big Ten honors after being selected to the second team. Her junior season was more spectacular as she was named Ohio State's Most Valuable Player and was also selected as a first-team All-American by the NSCAA. On 14 December 2008, Dickenmann graduated from the university with a bachelor's degree in international business. She departed the university the career leader in assists (32), second in total points (89), and seventh in goals scored (27). Dickenmann was also a three-time Big Ten Academic All-American and a four-time Ohio State Scholar Athlete. She was the first Ohio State women's soccer player to earn an appearance on the Hermann Trophy watch list. The trophy is awarded to the top soccer player in the country.

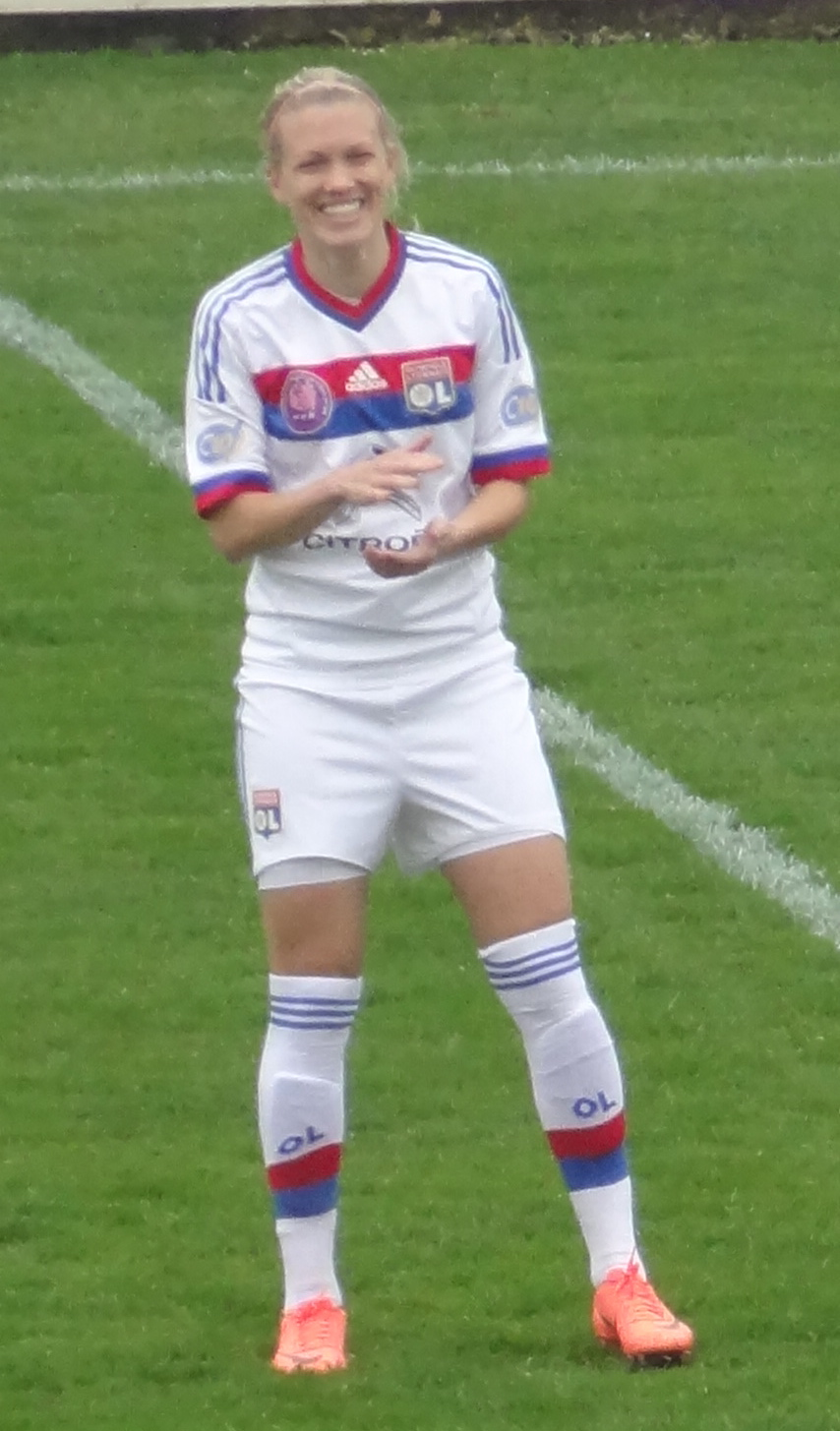
Lara Dickenmann with OL

=== Professional career ===
During the off-seasons when Dickenmann was in college, in an effort to continue playing high level soccer and still maintain her college eligibility, she starred with the New Jersey Wildcats in 2006, and for Jersey Sky Blue in 2007. With Jersey Sky Blue, Dickenmann was named the W-League Most Valuable Player for the 2007 W-League season. Following her senior season at Ohio State, she played half a season with FC Zürich Frauen, the women's section of popular Swiss club FC Zürich, helping the team win the 2008–09 league championship. Prior to graduating, it was announced that Dickenmann would be joining Division 1 Féminine club Olympique Lyonnais in 2009. Dickenmann joined the club mid-season during the 2008–09 season and was limited to only four appearances, though she did score two goals. Lyon were later declared champions of the league winning by a very wide margin. For the 2009–10 season, Dickenmann was named a starter and began the season on a positive note scoring a goal in Lyon's 6–0 win over Montigny-le-Bretonneux. On 29 November 2009, she scored her first professional hat trick in a 9–0 victory over ESOF Vendée La Roche-sur-Yon.

In April 2015 Dickenmann agreed a transfer to VfL Wolfsburg.

=== International career ===
Dickenmann starred with the Swiss women's under-19 team in both the 2002 and 2004 UEFA Women's Under-19 Championship. In both editions, the Swiss failed to get out of the group stage. On 14 August 2002, at the age 16, she made her international debut in a match against France. Switzerland lost the match 2–1, but Dickenmann was responsible for the Swiss's only goal scoring it in the 33rd minute. Since her debut, Dickenmann has been a regular in the squad appearing in teams that attempted to qualify for UEFA Women's Euro 2005, the 2007 FIFA Women's World Cup, and UEFA Women's Euro 2009; all of which the Swiss have failed to qualify for. Dickenman and Switzerland also missed out on qualification for the 2011 FIFA Women's World Cup. She scored her first goal of the qualification process in a 2–0 victory over the Republic of Ireland converting a penalty.

Goals scored for the Swiss WNT in official competitions
Competition	Stage	Date	Location	Opponent	Goals	Result	Overall
2007 FIFA World Cup	Qualifiers	2006–03–25	Biel	Republic of Ireland	2	2–0	2
2009 UEFA Euro	Qualifiers	2008–05–08	Oberdorf	Wales	2	2–0	2
2011 FIFA World Cup	Qualifiers	2009–09–19	Wohlen	Republic of Ireland	1	2–0	4
2011 FIFA World Cup	Qualifiers	2010–03–27	Wohlen	Israel	1	6–0	4
2011 FIFA World Cup	Qualifiers	2010–06–23	Karagandy	Kazakhstan	2	4–2	4
2013 UEFA Euro	Qualifiers	2011–11–24	Aarau	Kazakhstan	3	8–1	5
2013 UEFA Euro	Qualifiers	2012–03–31	Aarau	Turkey	1	5–0	5
2013 UEFA Euro	Qualifiers	2012–09–15	Istanbul	Turkey	1	3–1	5
2015 FIFA World Cup	Qualifiers	2013–09–21	Nyon	Serbia	1	9–0	10
2015 FIFA World Cup	Qualifiers	2013–09–26	Reykjavík	Iceland	1	2–0	10
2015 FIFA World Cup	Qualifiers	2014–02–12	Petach-Tikva	Israel	1	5–0	10
2015 FIFA World Cup	Qualifiers	2014–04–05	Zug	Malta	3	11–0	10
2015 FIFA World Cup	Qualifiers	2014–04–10	Aarau	Denmark	1	1–1	10
2015 FIFA World Cup	Qualifiers	2014–05–08	Nyon	Iceland	1	3–0	10
2015 FIFA World Cup	Qualifiers	2014–06–19	Inđija	Serbia	2	7–0	10
2017 UEFA Euro	Qualifiers	2015–10–27	Biel/Bienne	Georgia	1	4–0	4
2017 UEFA Euro	Qualifiers	2015–11–27	Lurgan	Northern Ireland	1	8–1	4
2017 UEFA Euro	Qualifiers	2016–09–15	Gori	Georgia	1	3–0	4
2017 UEFA Euro	First Stage	2017–07–22	Doetinchem	Iceland	1	2–1	4
2019 FIFA World Cup	Qualifiers	2017–09–15	Elbasan	Albania	1	4–1	5
2019 FIFA World Cup	Qualifiers	2017–09–19	Biel/Bienne	Poland	1	2–1	5
2019 FIFA World Cup	Qualifiers	2018–04–05	Schaffhausen	Scotland	1	1–0	5
2019 FIFA World Cup	Qualifiers	2018–06–12	Minsk	Belarus	2	5–0	5

== Career statistics ==
=== Club ===
Statistics accurate as of match played 13 September 2015

Club	Season	League		Cup		Continental		Total	
Club	Season	Apps	Goals	Apps	Goals	Apps	Goals	Apps	Goals
New Jersey Wildcats	2006	8	8	—				8	8
New Jersey Wildcats	Total	8	8	—				8	8
Jersey Sky Blue	2007	11	18	—				11	18
Jersey Sky Blue	Total	11	18	—				11	18
Zürich Frauen	2008–09	—							
Zürich Frauen	Total	—							
Lyon	2008–09	4	2	1	0	2	0	7	2
Lyon	2009–10	21	15	3	1	8	0	32	16
Lyon	2010–11	16	8	2	0	8	5	26	13
Lyon	2011–12	18	9	6	2	7	3	31	14
Lyon	2012–13	17	5	5	3	9	1	31	9
Lyon	2013–14	21	8	3	2	4	0	28	10
Lyon	2014–15	20	10	4	1	4	0	28	11
Lyon	Total	117	57	24	9	42	9	183	75
VfL Wolfsburg	2015–16	3	1	0	0	0	0	3	1
Career total		139	84	24	9	42	9	205	102

=== International ===
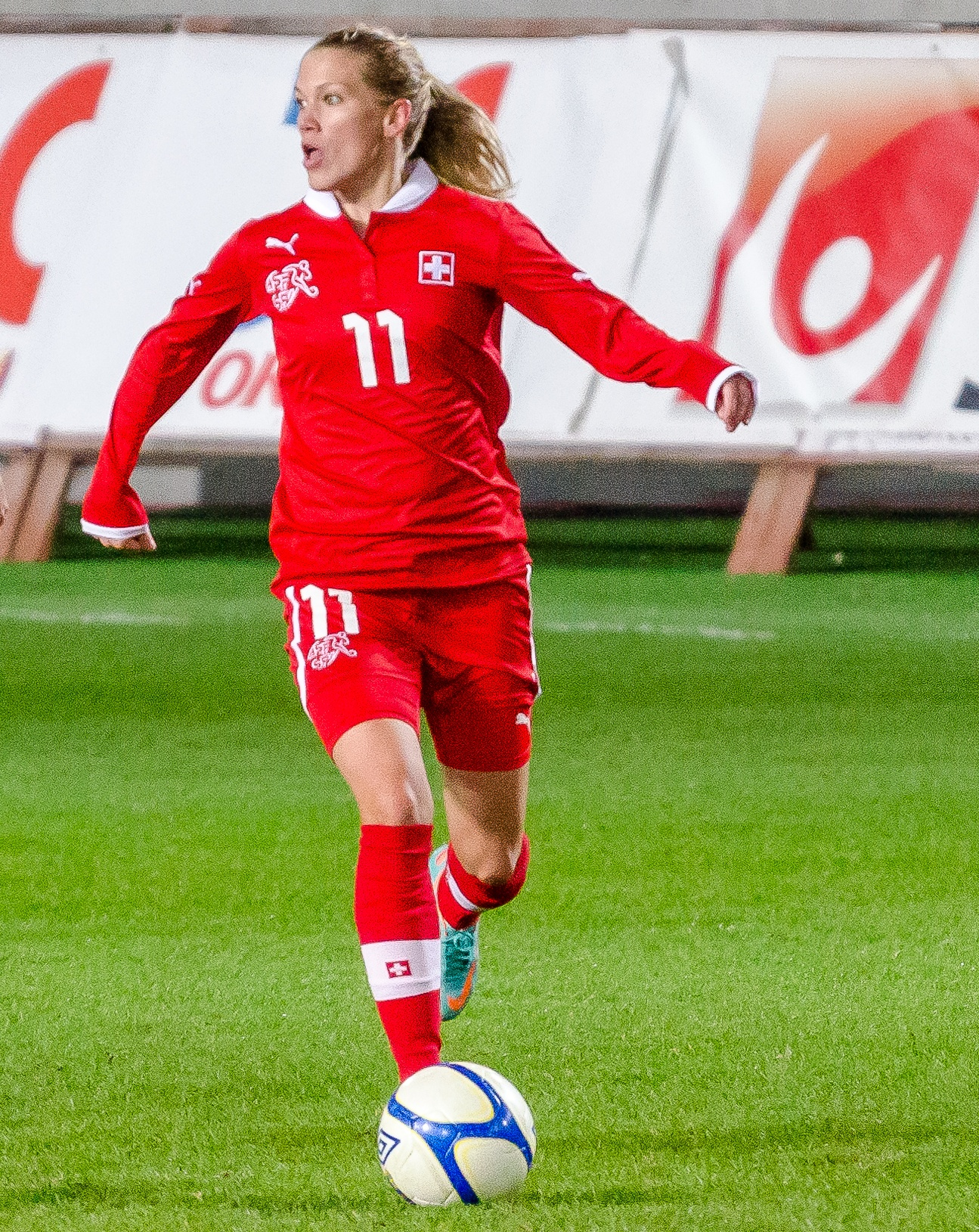
Playing for Switzerland in 2011

(Correct as of 18 May 2012)

National team	Season	Apps	Goals
Switzerland	2002–03	6	2
Switzerland	2003–04	3	0
Switzerland	2004–05	1	0
Switzerland	2005–06	3	2
Switzerland	2006–07	2	0
Switzerland	2007–08	9	5
Switzerland	2008–09	8	3
Switzerland	2009–10	14	6
Switzerland	2010–11	12	1
Switzerland	2011–12	8	4
Total		66	23

== International goals ==
No.	Date	Venue	Opponent	Score	Result	Competition
1.	14 August 2002		France	1–1	2–1	Friendly
2.	22 April 2006	Biel, Switzerland	Republic of Ireland	1–0	2–0	2007 FIFA Women's World Cup qualification
3.	22 April 2006	Biel, Switzerland	Republic of Ireland	2–0	2–0	2007 FIFA Women's World Cup qualification
4.	8 May 2008	Oberdorf, Switzerland	Wales	1–0	2–0	UEFA Women's Euro 2009 qualifying
5.	8 May 2008	Oberdorf, Switzerland	Wales	2–0	2–0	UEFA Women's Euro 2009 qualifying
6.	19 September 2009	Wohlen, Switzerland	Republic of Ireland	2–0	2–0	2011 FIFA Women's World Cup qualification
7.	24 February 2010	Larnaca, Cyprus	Canada	1–0	1–2	2010 Cyprus Women's Cup
8.	1 March 2010	Nicosia, Cyprus	England	1–0	2–2	2010 Cyprus Women's Cup
9.	1 March 2010	Nicosia, Cyprus	England	2–2	2–2	2010 Cyprus Women's Cup
10.	27 March 2010	Wohlen, Switzerland	Israel	5–0	6–0	2011 FIFA Women's World Cup qualification
11.	23 June 2010	Karagandy, Kazakhstan	Kazakhstan	2–1	4–2	2011 FIFA Women's World Cup qualification
12.	23 June 2010	Karagandy, Kazakhstan	Kazakhstan	3–2	4–2	2011 FIFA Women's World Cup qualification
13.	9 March 2011	Larnaca, Cyprus	Northern Ireland	1–0	2–1	2011 Cyprus Women's Cup
14.	24 November 2011	Aarau, Switzerland	Kazakhstan	1–0	8–1	UEFA Women's Euro 2013 qualifying
15.	24 November 2011	Aarau, Switzerland	Kazakhstan	5–1	8–1	UEFA Women's Euro 2013 qualifying
16.	24 November 2011	Aarau, Switzerland	Kazakhstan	8–1	8–1	UEFA Women's Euro 2013 qualifying
17.	31 March 2012	Aarau, Switzerland	Turkey	5–0	5–0	UEFA Women's Euro 2013 qualifying
18.	22 August 2012	Altach, Austria	Austria	2–0	2–1	Friendly
19.	15 September 2012	Istanbul, Turkey	Turkey	1–0	3–1	UEFA Women's Euro 2013 qualifying
20.	11 March 2013	Larnaca, Cyprus	Finland	2–2	3–2	2013 Cyprus Women's Cup
21.	21 September 2013	Nyon, Switzerland	Serbia	3–0	9–0	2015 FIFA Women's World Cup qualification
22.	26 September 2013	Reykjavík, Iceland	Iceland	2–0	2–0	2015 FIFA Women's World Cup qualification
23.	12 February 2014	Petah Tikva, Israel	Israel	4–0	5–0	2015 FIFA Women's World Cup qualification
24.	5 March 2014	Paralimni, Cyprus	South Korea	1–0	1–1	2014 Cyprus Women's Cup
25.	10 March 2014	Paralimni, Cyprus	Republic of Ireland	1–0	1–2	2014 Cyprus Women's Cup
26.	5 April 2014	Zug, Switzerland	Malta	2–0	11–0	2015 FIFA Women's World Cup qualification
27.	5 April 2014	Zug, Switzerland	Malta	7–0	11–0	2015 FIFA Women's World Cup qualification
28.	5 April 2014	Zug, Switzerland	Malta	11–0	11–0	2015 FIFA Women's World Cup qualification
29.	10 April 2014	Aarau, Switzerland	Denmark	1–1	1–1	2015 FIFA Women's World Cup qualification
30.	8 May 2014	Nyon, Switzerland	Iceland	3–0	3–0	2015 FIFA Women's World Cup qualification
31.	19 June 2014	Inđija, Serbia	Serbia	2–0	7–0	2015 FIFA Women's World Cup qualification
32.	19 June 2014	Inđija, Serbia	Serbia	4–0	7–0	2015 FIFA Women's World Cup qualification
33.	4 March 2015	Lagos, Portugal	Iceland	1–0	2–0	2015 Algarve Cup
34.	4 March 2015	Lagos, Portugal	Iceland	2–0	2–0	2015 Algarve Cup
35.	27 October 2015	Biel/Bienne, Switzerland	Georgia	3–0	4–0	UEFA Women's Euro 2017 qualifying
36.	27 November 2015	Lurgan, Northern Ireland	Northern Ireland	8–1	8–1	UEFA Women's Euro 2017 qualifying
37.	15 September 2016	Gori, Georgia	Georgia	3–0	3–0	UEFA Women's Euro 2017 qualifying
38.	8 March 2017	Larnaca, Cyprus	South Korea	1–0	1–0	2017 Cyprus Women's Cup
39.	10 April 2017	Skien, Norway	Norway	1–1	1–2	Friendly
40.	22 July 2017	Doetinchem, Netherlands	Iceland	1–1	2–1	UEFA Women's Euro 2017
41.	15 September 2017	Elbasan, Albania	Albania	4–0	4–1	2019 FIFA Women's World Cup qualification
42.	19 September 2017	Biel/Bienne, Switzerland	Poland	2–1	2–1	2019 FIFA Women's World Cup qualification
43.	5 April 2018	Schaffhausen, Switzerland	Scotland	1–0	1–0	2019 FIFA Women's World Cup qualification
44.	12 June 2018	Minsk, Belarus	Belarus	2–0	5–0	2019 FIFA Women's World Cup qualification
45.	12 June 2018	Minsk, Belarus	Belarus	4–0	5–0	2019 FIFA Women's World Cup qualification
46.	30 August 2018	Paisley, Scotland	Scotland	1–2	1–2	2019 FIFA Women's World Cup qualification

== Honours ==
=== Club ===
Zürich Frauen

- Nationalliga A: Winner 2008–09

Lyon

- Division 1 Féminine: Winner 2009–10, 2010–11, 2011–12, 2012–13, 2013–14, 2014–15
- Coupe de France Féminine: Winner 2011–12, 2012–13, 2013–14, 2014–15
- UEFA Women's Champions League: Winner 2010–11, 2011–12

VfL Wolfsburg

- Bundesliga: Winner 2016–17, 2017–18, 2018–19, 2019–20
- DFB-Pokal: Winner 2015–16, 2016–17, 2017–18, 2018–19, 2019–20, 2020–21

== Personal ==
She is openly lesbian and married with her former teammate Anna Blässe.
