= 2009–10 Challenge de France =

Tournament details
- Country: France

Final positions
- Champions: Paris Saint-Germain (1st title)
- Runners-up: Montpellier

The 2009–10 Challenge de France is the ninth season of the French cup competition for women, organized by the French Football Federation. The competition is open to all women's clubs in French football. The final will be contested on 23 May 2010 at the Stade Robert-Bobin. The defending champions were Montpellier, who defeated Le Mans 3–1 in the 2008–09 edition of the competition. On 23 May 2010, Division 1 Féminine club Paris Saint-Germain won the competition by defeating fellow first division club Montpellier by a score of 5–0 in the final. The victory gives Paris Saint-Germain its first Challenge de France title.

== Calendar ==
On 6 July 2009, the French Football Federation announced the calendar for the Challenge de France.

Round	First match date	Fixtures	Clubs	Notes
Regional semi-finals	22 November 2009			Clubs participating in D3 Féminine gain entry.
Regional finals	13 December 2009			
First Round	10 January 2010			Clubs participating in D2 Féminine gain entry.
Second Round	31 January 2010			
Round of 32	21 February 2010	16	32 → 16	Clubs participating in D1 Féminine gain entry.
Round of 16	7 March 2010	8	16 → 8	
Quarter-finals	21 March 2010	4	8 → 4	
Semi-finals	25 April 2010	2	4 → 2	
Final	23 May 2010	1	2 → 1	Final at the Stade Robert-Bobin.

== First round ==
The draw for the first round of Challenge de France was conducted on 18 December 2009 at the headquarters of the French Football Federation, in Paris by French journalist Christian Jeanpierre and Marilou Duringer, a member of the Federal Council. The matches were played on 10 January 2010. Several matches that were postponed were played on 17 January. The rest of the postponed matches will be contested on 24 January

Tie no	Home team	Score	Away team
1	Val d'Argenteuil	2 – 2 (aet); 2–4 p.	Bagneux
2	Gonfreville	1 – 2	Évreux
3	Cormelles	0 – 0 (aet); 6–5 p.	Tremblay
4	Le Blanc-Mesnil	1 – 2	Rouen
5	Thiberville	0 – 4	Issy-les-Moulineaux
6	Bourg-la-Reine	0 – 1	Anet
7	Saint-Malo	3 – 4	Lorient
8	FA Laval	0 – 2	Condé-sur-Noireau
9	Domont	3 – 3 (aet); 3–5 p.	Ploermel
10	Brunoy	1 – 1 (aet); 1–4 p.	Rennes
11	Évry Ville	0 – 2	Saint-Maur
12	Le Mans	10 – 0	Saint-Lô Manche
13	Nord Médoc	0 – 4	Corné
14	Terves	0 – 4	Saint Georges-sur-Layon
15	La Flèche	2 – 7	Tours
16	Limoges	2 – 2 (aet); 4–3 p.	Saint-Herblain
17	Angers	1 – 2	Blanquefort
18	Blois	1 – 2	Arlac-Mérignac
19	Muret	11 – 0	Saint-Simon

Tie no	Home team	Score	Away team
20	Villeneuve-les-Maguelone	0 – 5	Rodez
21	Nîmes Métropole	6 – 1	Saint-Gaudens
22	Carros	3 – 5	Albi
23	Aubune	4 – 4 (aet); 3–4 p.	Saint-Jean-de-Vedas
24	Ramonville	0 – 6	Monteux
25	Saint-Apollinaire	2 – 1	Flacé-Mâcon
26	Nivolas	3 – 2	Auxerre
27	Salaise-Sanne	1 – 2	Le Puy Foot
28	Aulnat	2 – 1	Claix
29	Saint Lou	0 – 7	Arpajon
30	Blanzy	1 – 4	La Véore
31	Mussig	0 – 4	Troyes
32	Algrange	3 – 0	Saint-Memmie
33	Besançon	0 – 4	Woippy
34	Mulhouse	0 – 0 (aet); 4–5 p.	Épinal
35	Sessenheim-Stattmatten	0 – 8	Vendenheim
36	Baume-les-Dames	0 – 5	Mars Bischheim
37	Arras	2 – 0	Halliun
38	Montières Amiens	0 – 0 (aet); 2–3 p.	Raismes
39	Arcques	2 – 4	Compiègne
40	Abbeville	0 – 2	Gravelines

== Second round ==
The draw for the second round of Challenge de France was based on the results of the first round with the winners advancing to the second round to face each other based on where they were drawn. The matches will be played on 31 January 2010.

Tie no	Home team	Score	Away team
1	Bagneux	0 – 1	Évreux
2	Anet	0 – 5	Issy-les-Moulineaux
3	Cormelles	2 – 1	Rouen
4	Lorient	1 – 4	Condé-sur-Noireau
5	Ploermel	1 – 3	Rennes
6	Saint-Maur	0 – 3	Le Mans
7	Corné	5 – 0	Saint Georges-sur-Layon
8	Tours	2 – 0	Limoges
9	Blanquefort	2 – 2(aet); 5–3 p.	Arlac-Mérignac
10	Rodez	0 – 4	Muret

Tie no	Home team	Score	Away team
11	Nîmes Métropole	2 – 1	Albi
12	Saint-Jean-de-Vedas	1 – 3	Monteux
13	Nivolas	3 – 0	Saint-Apollinaire
14	La Véore	3 – 3(aet); 3–5 p.	Arpajon
15	Woippy	4 – 2	Épinal
16	Troyes	1 – 5	Algrange
17	Le Puy Foot	2 – 2(aet); 2–3 p.	Aulnat
18	Raismes	1 – 3	Arras
19	Mars Bischheim	3 – 2	Vendenheim
20	Gravelines	0 – 2	Compiègne

== Round of 32 ==
The draw for the Round of 32 of the Challenge de France was conducted on 8 February and saw the arrival of clubs based in Division 1 Féminine. The draw was conducted by Jézabel Lemonier and Christophe Pacaud, who hosts the television show Direct Sport and French television channel Direct 8. The matches were played on 21 February.

Tie no	Home team	Score	Away team
1	Condé-sur-Noireau	2 – 0	Gravelines
2	Toulouse	1 – 7	Saint-Étienne
3	Le Mans	0 – 0(aet); 4–3 p.	Corné
4	Tours	2 – 5	Soyaux
5	Rennes	1 – 1(aet); 3–1 p.	Blanquefort
6	Montigny-le-Bretonneux	1 – 2	Paris Saint-Germain
7	La Rochue-sur-Yon	1 – 3	Stade Briochin
8	Muret	2 – 0	Monteux

Tie no	Home team	Score	Away team
9	Nord Allier	PPD	Lyon
10	Arpajon	1 – 8	Montpellier
11	Woippy	2 – 1	Nivolas
12	Algrange	0 – 2	Juvisy
13	Aulnat	1 – 1(aet); 5–3 p.	Nîmes Métropole
14	Arras	7 – 0	Cormelles
15	Issy-les-Moulineaux	3 – 1	Mars Bischheim
16	Évreux	0 – 3	Hénin-Beaumont

== Round of 16 ==
The draw for the Round of 16 of the Challenge de France was conducted on 24 February at the headquarters of the French Football Federation. The draw was conducted by Sandrine Roux, the current coach of the France women's under-19 team. The matches were played on 7 March.

Tie no	Home team	Score	Away team
1	Paris Saint-Germain	0 – 0(aet); 5–4 p.	Le Mans
2	Soyaux	5 – 2	Rennes
3	Arras	1 – 4	Stade Briochin
4	Hénin-Beaumont	6 – 1	Condé-sur-Noireau

Tie no	Home team	Score	Away team
5	Woippy	1 – 1(aet); 2–4 p.	Aulnat
6	Muret	0 – 9	Lyon
7	Juvisy	2 – 0	Saint-Étienne
8	Montpellier	3 – 1	Issy-les-Moulineaux

== Quarterfinals ==
The draw for the quarterfinals and semi-finals of the Challenge de France was held on 8 March 2010. The draw was conducted by Red Cross ambassador and fashion model Adriana Karembeu. The quarterfinals were contested on 21 March.

21 March
15:00 CET

Aulnat	0 – 2	Montpellier
	Report	Rubio 86'; Meynier 90'

Stade Pierre Ducourtial, Aulnat
Attendance: 250
Referee: Florence Guillemin (Ligue de Franche-Comté)

21 March
15:00 CET

Hénin-Beaumont	2 – 4	Paris Saint-Germain
Crammer 48', 53'	Report	Pizzala 6'; Thomas 10'; Lepailleur 43'; Houara 45'

Stade Raymonde Delabre, Hénin-Beaumont
Attendance: 440
Referee: Solenne Bartnik (Ligue Rhône-Alpes)

21 March
15:00 CET

Soyaux	0 – 2	Lyon
	Report	Kaci 42'; Thomis 43'

Stade Léo Lagrange, Besançon
Attendance: 300
Referee: Élodie Coppola (Ligue de Bretagne)

21 March
15:00 CET

Stade Briochin	0 – 3	Juvisy
	Report	Soubeyrand 23'; Tonazzi 31', 42'

Stade Fred Aubert, Saint-Brieuc
Attendance: 30
Referee: Noelle Robin (Ligue de la Méditerranée)

== Semi-finals ==
The draw for the quarterfinals and semi-finals of the Challenge de France was held on 8 March 2010. The draw was conducted by Red Cross ambassador and fashion model Adriana Karembeu. The semi-finals were contested on 25 April.

25 April
17:00 CET

Paris Saint-Germain	1 – 1	Lyon
Pizzala 10'	Report	Herlovsen 18'
Penalties
	3–2

Stade Georges Lefèvre, Paris
Referee: Florence Guillemin (Ligue de Franche-Comté)

25 April
17:00 CET

Montpellier	3 – 1	Juvisy
Delie 15'; Rubio 66'; Plaza 75'	Report	Tonazzi 60'

Stade Joseph-Blanc, Montpellier
Referee: Severine Zinck (Ligue d'Alsace)

== Final ==
23 May
18:30 CET

Paris Saint-Germain	5 – 0	Montpellier
Boyeldieu 19'; Pizzala 54', 85'; Coton-Pélagie 68'; Bussaglia 71'	Report

Stade Robert Bobin, Bondoufle
Attendance: 4,200
Referee: Sabine Bonnin (Ligue du Centre)

== See also ==
- 2009–10 D1 Féminine
