= Bérangère Sapowicz =

French footballer (born 1983)

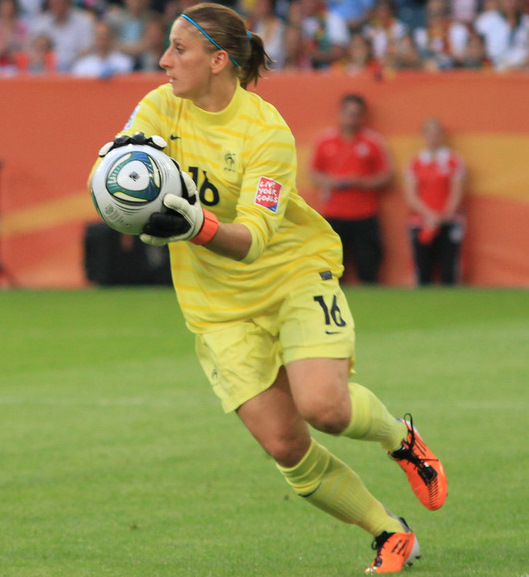
- Sapowicz at the 2011 World Cup

Personal information
- Full name: Bérangère Sapowicz
- Date of birth: 6 February 1983 (age 43)
- Place of birth: Verneuil-sur-Avre, France
- Height: 5 ft 5 in (1.65 m)
- Position: Goalkeeper

Youth career
- 1986–1998: Breteuil
- 1998–2002: Évreux
- 2000–2002: CNFE Clairefontaine
- 2002–2003: Paris Saint-Germain

Senior career*
Years	Team	Apps	(Gls)
2003–2013	Paris Saint-Germain	117	(1)

International career^{‡}
2002	France U-19		
2003–2011	France	23	(0)
- * Club domestic league appearances and goals as of 10 June 2011 (UTC) ‡ National team caps and goals as of 16 July 2011 (UTC)

Bérangère Sapowicz (born 6 February 1983) is a former French football player who played long time for French club Paris Saint-Germain of the Division 1 Féminine. Sapowicz plays as a goalkeeper and is a member of the France women's national football team having made her debut in 2003. That same year, she was selected to participate in 2003 FIFA Women's World Cup, held in the United States.

Since 2018 she is goalkeeper coach of a men's team in the fifth league, AS Fabrègues.

== Club career ==
=== Early career ===
Sapowicz initially trained in gymnastics before beginning a career in football. She began her career playing for nearby club Association Sportive Bretolienne. She spent 12 years at the club before joining the women's section of city club Évreux AC (now Évreux FC). While at Évreux, she became a youth international and eventually was selected to attend CNFE Clairefontaine, the women's section of the Clairefontaine academy.

=== Paris Saint-Germain ===
In 2002, she joined Paris Saint-Germain and after a year in the youth system joined the club's senior team. In her first season with the club (2003–04), she appeared in 17 matches. The following season, her playing time decreased making only ten appearances in the league, which included scoring a goal. In the next two seasons, she appeared in 27 matches. Her 2007–08 season was uneventful as she missed the entire year due to tearing her ACL in one of her knees. She returned to form for the 2008–09 season appearing in 20 matches as Les Parisiens finished the season mid-table.

The 2009–10 season saw the arrival of fellow internationals Camille Abily, Sonia Bompastor, and Élise Bussaglia. The arrival of the veterans paid extreme dividends to the club and Sapowicz as the goalkeeper failed to concede a goal until the 10th league match of the season. Sapowicz finished the season appearing in 25 total matches. She was the starting goalkeeper for Paris Saint-Germain in its 5–0 win over Montpellier in the 2010 Challenge de France Final. Sapowicz remained the first-choice goalkeeper for the 2010–11 season. The goalkeeper appeared in 20 league matches as Paris Saint-Germain qualified for the 2011–12 edition of the UEFA Women's Champions League after finishing runner-up to champions Lyon.

== International career ==
Sapowicz had previously starred with the women's under-17, under-19, under-20, and under-21 teams. In 2002, she was designated as the starting goalkeeper for the under-19 team at the 2002 FIFA U-19 Women's World Championship, held in Canada. She appeared in all three group stage matches as France suffered group stage elimination. The following year, on 14 September 2003, Sapowicz was selected to the France squad to play in the 2003 FIFA Women's World Cup, despite not having any senior international experience. She was installed as the backup goalkeeper, but did not make any appearances as France suffered elimination in the group stage. On 14 September 2003, she made her senior international debut in a friendly match against Japan. Due to an injury to France number one Sarah Bouhaddi, national team coach Bruno Bini gave Sapowicz the starting goalkeeper position for France's qualifying campaign for the 2011 FIFA Women's World Cup and the competition itself.

== Career statistics ==
=== Club ===
Statistics accurate as of 10 June 2011

Club	Season	League		Cup		Continental		Total	
Club	Season	Apps	Goals	Apps	Goals	Apps	Goals	Apps	Goals
Paris SG	2003–04	17	0	0	0	0	0	17	0
Paris SG	2004–05	10	1	0	0	0	0	10	1
Paris SG	2005–06	18	0	0	0	0	0	18	0
Paris SG	2006–07	11	0	0	0	0	0	11	0
Paris SG	2007–08	0	0	0	0	0	0	0	0
Paris SG	2008–09	20	0	1	0	0	0	21	0
Paris SG	2009–10	21	0	4	0	0	0	25	0
Paris SG	2010–11	20	0	1	0	0	0	21	0
Paris SG	2011–12	2	0	0	0	0	0	2	0
Paris SG	2012–13	0	0	0	0	0	0	0	0
Paris SG	Total	119	1	6	0	0	0	125	1
Career total		117	1	6	0	0	0	123	1

=== International ===
(Correct as of 16 July 2011)

National team	Season	Apps	Goals
France	2003–04	1	0
France	2004–05	0	0
France	2005–06	0	0
France	2006–07	0	0
France	2007–08	0	0
France	2008–09	0	0
France	2009–10	8	0
France	2010–11	14	0
Total		23	0

== Honours ==
=== Club ===
Paris Saint-Germain

- Challenge de France (1): 2009–10
