= Caroline Pizzala =

French footballer (born 1987)

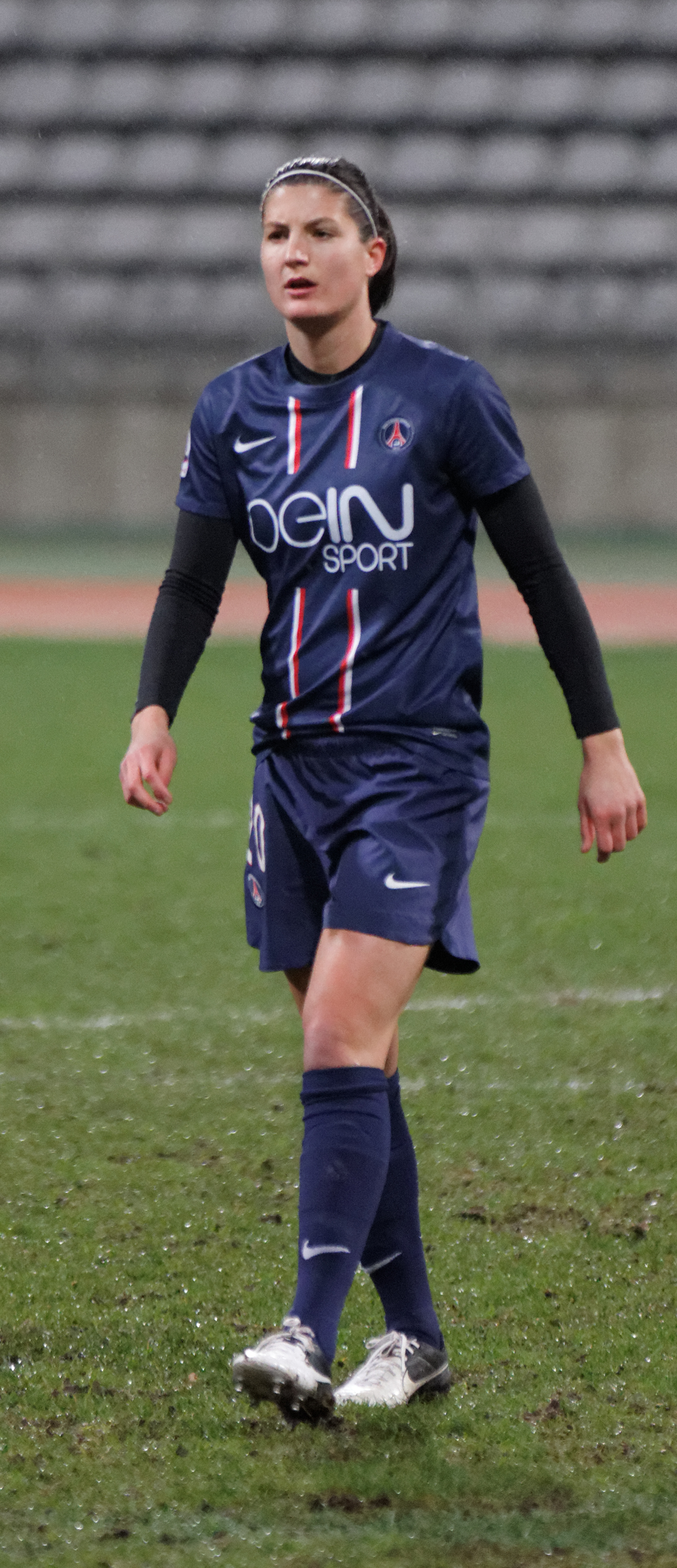
- Pizzala with PSG, 2013

Personal information
- Full name: Caroline Pizzala
- Date of birth: 23 November 1987 (age 38)
- Place of birth: Marseille, France
- Height: 1.68 m (5 ft 6 in)
- Position: Midfielder

Youth career
- 1994–1997: Marseille Sud d'Espagne
- 1997–2001: ASPTT Marseille
- 2001–2004: Celtic Marseille
- 2004–2005: CNFE Clairefontaine

Senior career*
Years	Team	Apps	(Gls)
2005–2006	CNFE Clairefontaine	22	(0)
2006–2007	Celtic Marseille	12	(3)
2007–2014	Paris Saint-Germain	127	(20)
2014–2020	Olympique de Marseille	123	(28)

International career
2007–2011	France	17	(0)
- * Club domestic league appearances and goals as of 14 October 2022 (UTC)

Caroline Pizzala (born 23 November 1987) is a French former football player who played as a midfielder. She plays as a central midfielder and is a member of the France women's national football team.

== Club career ==
=== Early career ===
Pizzala began her career playing for local club in her hometown before settling in at Celtic Marseille in 2001. While playing with Celtic, she was teammates with fellow international Louisa Necib. Both players were instrumental in helping the club win the Division 3 Féminine, the third level of French women's football in 2004. In the league's final match, Pizzala scored a goal in a 4–0 win over Le Mans. In 2004, Pizzala and Necib were both selected to attend CNFE Clairefontaine, the women's section of the Clairefontaine academy. She spent three years at the academy and made 22 appearances scoring no goals in her final season. After departing the academy, Pizzala returned to Celtic Marseille and played with the club's senior team, who were now playing in D2 Féminine, the second division of football for women in France. With Celtic, she made 13 league appearances scoring two goals.

=== Paris Saint-Germain ===
Following the 2006–07 season, Pizzala signed with Paris Saint-Germain. Her inaugural season at the club saw Pizzala earn her international debut with France, though her domestic club struggled finishing mid-table. For the 2009–10 season, fellow internationals Camille Abily, Sonia Bompastor, and Élise Bussaglia joined Les Parisiens. The arrival of veterans have paid off for Paris Saint-Germain as the club reached first place in the league after the first ten matches. Pizzala appeared in all ten of those matches scoring two goals against Soyaux and La Roche-sur-Yon. In the 2009–10 edition of the Challenge de France, Pizzala scored two goals as Paris Saint-Germain reached the final. In the final, she scored a double as PSG cruised to a 5–0 victory over Montpellier. Pizzala finished the season with 25 total appearances and eight goals. Pizzala remained a starter for the 2010–11 season. She appeared in all 22 league matches scoring three goals as Paris Saint-Germain finished runner-up to the champions Lyon. The second-place finish resulted in Paris Saint-Germain qualifying for the UEFA Women's Champions League for the first time in the club's history.

=== Olympique de Marseille ===
After seven seasons in Paris, during the summer of 2014, she decided to not renew her contract with Paris Saint-Germain and return to her home town of Marseille to join Division 2 Féminine side Olympique de Marseille. She helped the club win the Division 2 title in 2015–16, and gain promotion to Division 1 Féminine's following season.

== International career ==
Pizzala had previously starred with the women's under-17 team helping France win the bronze medal at the 2003 European Youth Festival, an early incarnation of what is now the UEFA Women's Under-17 Championship. In 2009, Pizzala appeared for her nation at the 2009 University Games, held in Belgrade, Serbia. Pizzala captained the team that finished in 4th-place position after losing 4–1 to Great Britain in the bronze medal match. On 1 November 2007, she earned her first cap with the senior women's national team in a match against Netherlands. Since making her debut, Pizzala has featured in only one competitive match for France; a 2–0 away win over Slovenia in qualifying for UEFA Women's Euro 2009. The rest of her appearances have been in friendly matches.

== Career statistics ==
=== Club ===
Statistics accurate as of match played 14 October 2022

Club	Season	League		Cup		Continental		Total	
Club	Season	Apps	Goals	Apps	Goals	Apps	Goals	Apps	Goals
CNFE Clairefontaine	2005–06	22	0	0	0	–	–	22	0
CNFE Clairefontaine	Total	22	0	0	0	–	–	22	0
Celtic Marseille	2006–07	12	3	0	0	–	–	12	3
Celtic Marseille	Total	12	3	0	0	–	–	12	3
Paris SG	2007–08	19	4	4	0	–	–	23	4
Paris SG	2008–09	17	4	1	0	–	–	18	4
Paris SG	2009–10	20	4	5	4	–	–	25	8
Paris SG	2010–11	22	3	1	0	–	–	23	3
Paris SG	2011–12	18	4	5	6	4	0	27	10
Paris SG	2012–13	14	0	5	0	–	–	19	0
Paris SG	2013–14	17	1	3	1	–	–	20	2
Paris SG	Total	127	20	24	11	4	0	155	31
Ol. Marseille	2014–15	21	6	4	0	–	–	25	6
Ol. Marseille	2015–16	22	8	0	0	–	–	22	8
Ol. Marseille	2016–17	19	4	1	0	–	–	20	4
Ol. Marseille	2017-18	21	1	3	0	–	–	24	1
Ol. Marseille	2018-19	24	7	1	0	–	–	25	7
Ol. Marseille	2019-20	16	2	1	0	–	–	17	2
Ol. Marseille	Total	123	28	10	0	–	–	133	28
Career total		284	51	34	11	4	0	322	62

=== International ===
(Correct as of 25 August 2011)

National team	Season	Apps	Goals
France	2007–08	3	0
France	2008–09	4	0
France	2009–10	0	0
France	2010–11	9	0
France	2011–12	1	0
Total		17	0

== Honours ==
=== Club ===
Celtic Marseille

- Division 3 Féminine (1): 2003–04

Paris Saint-Germain

- Challenge de France (1): 2009–10

Olympique de Marseille

- Division 2 Féminine (1): 2015–16
