= Émilie L'Huillier =

French footballer

Personal information
- Date of birth: 3 July 1986 (age 40)
- Place of birth: Essey-lès-Nancy, France
- Position: Defender

Senior career*
Years	Team	Apps	(Gls)
2005–2010	Paris Saint-Germain		
2012–2013	Nancy		

International career
2004	France	1	(0)
- * Club domestic league appearances and goals

Émilie L'Huillier (born 3 July 1986) is a French former footballer who played as a defender for Paris Saint-Germain.

== National team ==
Émilie L'Huillier represented France women's national team once in 2004.

== Honours ==
- 2010 Challenge de France
