= Sabrina Delannoy =

French footballer (born 1986)

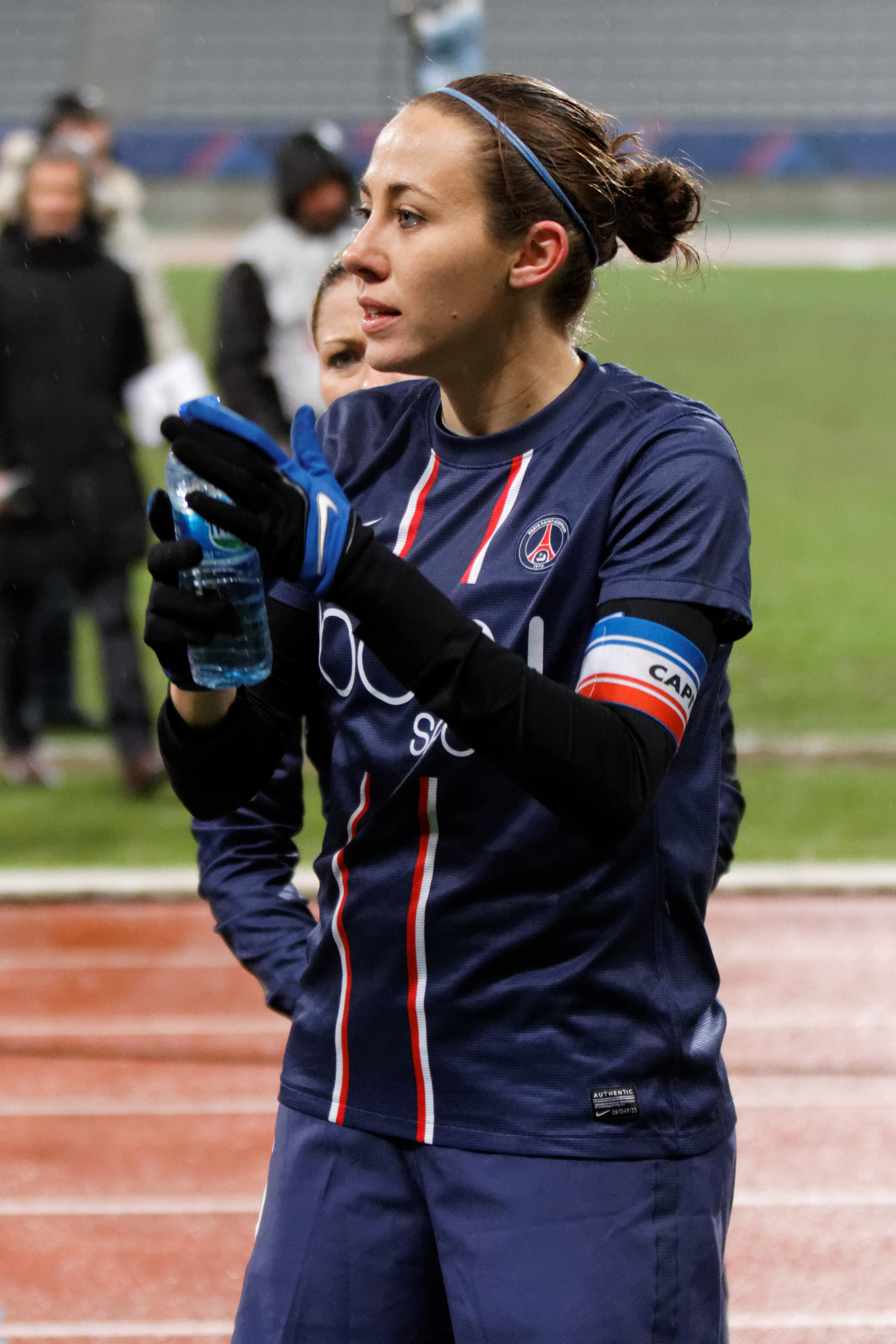
- Sabrina Delannoy in 2013

Personal information
- Full name: Sabrina Julienne Francine Delannoy
- Date of birth: 18 May 1986 (age 40)
- Place of birth: Béthune, Pas-de-Calais, France
- Height: 1.71 m (5 ft 7 in)
- Position: Defender

Youth career
- 1997–2003: USO Bruay-la-Buissière

Senior career*
Years	Team	Apps	(Gls)
2003–2005	CNFE Clairefontaine	41	(0)
2005–2017	Paris Saint-Germain	244	(25)
Total		285	(25)

International career
2006	France U20	5	(0)
2006–2007	France U21	5	(0)
2012	France B	2	(0)
2012–2016	France	39	(1)
- * Club domestic league appearances and goals

Sabrina Julienne Francine Delannoy (born 18 May 1986) is a French former football player who played for Division 1 Féminine club Paris Saint-Germain. She primarily played as a centre back, but was also capable of playing as a right back. Delannoy is a former women's youth international having played at under-20 and under-21 level. With the under-20 team, she played at the 2006 FIFA U-20 Women's World Championship.

== Club statistics ==
Club	Season	League		Cup		Continental		Total	
Club	Season	Apps	Goals	Apps	Goals	Apps	Goals	Apps	Goals
CNFE Clairefontaine
CNFE Clairefontaine	2003–04	21	0	0	0	0	0	21	0
CNFE Clairefontaine	2004–05	20	0	0	0	0	0	20	0
CNFE Clairefontaine	Total	41	0	0	0	0	0	41	0
Paris SG
Paris SG	2005–06	21	1	0	0	0	0	21	1
Paris SG	2006–07	20	0	0	0	0	0	20	0
Paris SG	2007–08	19	0	5	0	0	0	24	0
Paris SG	2008–09	19	0	1	0	0	0	20	0
Paris SG	2009–10	20	2	5	0	0	0	25	2
Paris SG	2010–11	22	5	0	0	0	0	22	5
Paris SG	2011–12	19	2	5	0	4	0	28	2
Paris SG	2012–13	21	4	5	0	0	0	26	4
Paris SG	2013–14	21	3	3	1	2	1	26	5
Paris SG	2014–15	19	2	3	0	9	2	31	4
Paris SG	2015–16	22	5	5	0	8	1	35	6
Paris SG	Total	223	24	32	1	23	4	278	29
Career total		264	24	32	1	23	4	319	29

== International goals ==
#	Date	Venue	Opponent	Score	Result	Competition
2	25 September 2013	Kazhimukan Munaitpasov Stadium, Astana, Kazakhstan	Kazakhstan	0–3	0–4	2015 FIFA Women's World Cup qualification
Correct as of 9 June 2015

== Honours ==
Paris Saint-Germain

- Coupe de France Féminine: 2009–10

Orders

- Knight of the National Order of Merit: 2025
