= Laure Boulleau =

French footballer (born 1986)

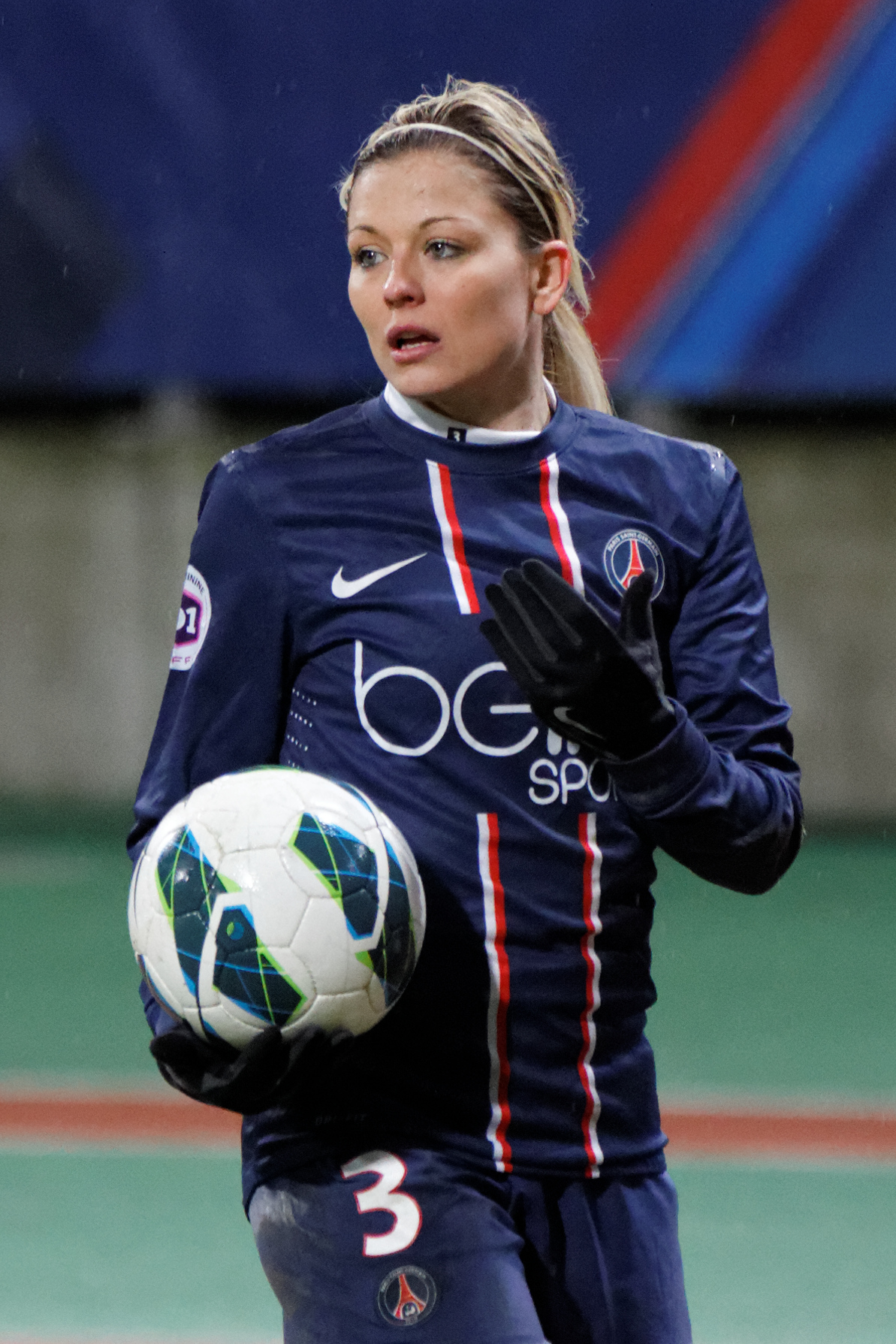
- Boulleau in 2013

Personal information
- Full name: Laure Pascale Claire Boulleau
- Date of birth: 22 October 1986 (age 40)
- Place of birth: Clermont-Ferrand, Puy-de-Dôme, France
- Height: 1.60 m (5 ft 3 in)
- Position: Left back

Youth career
- 1996–2000: FC Moulin-sur-Allier
- 2000–2001: FC Riom
- 2001–2002: Nord Allier Yzeure
- 2002–2003: Entente Yssingeaux

Senior career*
Years	Team	Apps	(Gls)
2003–2005	CNFE Clairefontaine	35	(0)
2005–2018	Paris Saint-Germain	181	(15)
Total		216	(15)

International career
2006	France U20	5	(1)
2006–2007	France U21	5	(0)
2005–2016	France	65	(0)
- * Club domestic league appearances and goals

Laure Pascale Claire Boulleau (born 22 October 1986) is a French former footballer who played for the Division 1 Féminine club Paris Saint-Germain (PSG). She primarily played as a defender and was a member of the France women's national football team. Boulleau is currently an ambassador for PSG and a consultant for the French television show Canal Football Club, which has been broadcast on the French television network Canal+ since 2008.

== Career statistics ==
=== Club ===
Appearances and goals by club, season and competition
Club	Season	League			Cup		Continental		Total	
Club	Season	Division	Apps	Goals	Apps	Goals	Apps	Goals	Apps	Goals
CNFE Clairefontaine	2003–04	Division 1	17	0	0	0	—		17	0
CNFE Clairefontaine	2004–05	Division 1	18	0	0	0	—		18	0
CNFE Clairefontaine	Total		35	0	0	0	—		35	0
Paris Saint-Germain	2005–06	Division 1	11	2	0	0	—		11	2
Paris Saint-Germain	2006–07	Division 1	16	3	0	0	—		16	3
Paris Saint-Germain	2007–08	Division 1	13	2	3	0	—		16	2
Paris Saint-Germain	2008–09	Division 1	9	0	0	0	—		9	0
Paris Saint-Germain	2009–10	Division 1	21	2	5	0	—		26	2
Paris Saint-Germain	2010–11	Division 1	16	0	1	0	—		17	0
Paris Saint-Germain	2011–12	Division 1	17	1	5	0	4	0	26	1
Paris Saint-Germain	2012–13	Division 1	19	2	5	1	—		24	3
Paris Saint-Germain	2013–14	Division 1	18	2	3	0	2	0	23	2
Paris Saint-Germain	2014–15	Division 1	15	1	2	0	5	0	22	1
Paris Saint-Germain	2015–16	Division 1	10	0	3	0	4	0	17	0
Paris Saint-Germain	2016–17	Division 1	2	0	0	0	0	0	2	0
Paris Saint-Germain	2017–18	Division 1	14	0	2	0	0	0	16	0
Paris Saint-Germain	Total		181	15	29	1	15	0	225	16
Career total			216	15	29	1	15	0	260	16

=== International ===
Appearances and goals by national team and year
National team	Year	Apps	Goals
France	2005	1	0
France	2006	1	0
France	2009	1	0
France	2010	6	0
France	2011	11	0
France	2012	13	0
France	2013	13	0
France	2014	6	0
France	2015	12	0
France	2016	1	0
Total		65	0

== Honours ==
Paris Saint-Germain

- Coupe de France: 2009–10, 2017–18; runner-up: 2007–08, 2013–14

Individual

- UEFA Women's Championship All-Star Team: 2013

Orders

- Knight of the National Order of Merit: 2023
