= 2009–10 Division 1 Féminine =

36th edition of top French women's football league

Division 1 Féminine
- Season: 2009–10
- Champions: Lyon (8th title)
- Relegated: Soyaux; Montigny-le-Bretonneux
- UEFA Women's Champions League: Lyon (Main round); Juvisy (First qualifying round)
- Matches: 132
- Goals: 461 (3.49 per match)
- Top goalscorer: Eugénie Le Sommer (18)
- Biggest home win: Lyon 9–0 La Roche-sur-Yon (29 November 2009); Paris SG 9–0 Toulouse (7 February 2010)
- Biggest away win: Toulouse 1–7 Lyon (1 November 2009)
- Highest scoring: Hénin-Beaumont 5–5 Stade Briochin (14 March 2010)

The 2009–10 Division 1 Féminine was the 36th edition of the women's league since its re-establishment by the French Football Federation. The league began on 27 September 2009 and ended on 13 June 2010. Olympique Lyonnais were the defending champions.

On 13 June 2010, Olympique Lyonnais successfully defended their league title winning the league by one point over Juvisy. The championship was assured following the club's 5–0 victory over Montigny-le-Bretonneux on the final match day of the season. Both Lyon and Juvisy will appear in next year's UEFA Women's Champions League. Montigny-le-Bretonneux and Soyaux were relegated to the second division.

== League table ==
Note: A win in D1 Féminine is worth 4 points, with 2 points for a draw and 1 for a defeat.

Pos	Team	Pld	W	D	L	GF	GA	GD	Pts	Qualification or relegation
1	Lyon (C, Q)	22	18	2	2	93	11	+82	78	Qualification for Women's Champions League
2	Juvisy (Q)	22	18	1	3	58	18	+40	77	Qualification for Women's Champions League
3	Paris Saint-Germain	22	16	4	2	62	8	+54	74	
4	Montpellier	22	15	3	4	48	18	+30	70	
5	Nord Allier	22	9	4	9	28	32	−4	53	
6	Saint-Étienne	22	8	2	12	26	44	−18	48	
7	Hénin-Beaumont	22	7	5	10	28	43	−15	48	
8	Toulouse	22	6	4	12	25	50	−25	44	
9	Stade Briochin	22	6	2	14	38	76	−38	42	
10	La Roche-sur-Yon	22	5	3	14	23	58	−35	40	
11	Soyaux (R)	22	3	5	14	13	44	−31	36	Relegation to Division 2 Féminine
12	Montigny-le-Bretonneux (R)	22	3	1	18	15	55	−40	32	Relegation to Division 2 Féminine

Rules for classification: 1st points; 2nd head-to-head goal difference; 3rd total goal difference
(C) Champions; (Q) Qualified for the phase indicated; (R) Relegated

== Results ==
Home \ Away	HEB	JUV	LRO	LYO	MOB	MON	YZE	PSG	SET	SOY	STB	TOU
Hénin-Beaumont		0–1	2–1	3–1	4–1	2–1	0–0	0–4	1–1	2–1	5–5	1–4
Juvisy	3–1		5–1	2–0	4–0	1–1	3–2	3–0	3–1	4–1	4–1	3–0
La Roche-sur-Yon	3–1	0–2		0–5	3–2	0–3	0–2	1–1	4–3	1–0	2–4	1–1
Lyon	3–1	6–1	9–0		6–0	5–0	4–0	1–1	5–0	5–0	5–0	5–0
Montigny-le-Bretonneux	3–0	1–3	0–2	0–5		2–5	0–1	0–1	0–1	1–0	0–2	1–1
Montpellier	4–0	1–0	3–0	1–3	5–1		0–1	0–0	1–0	3–0	4–1	3–0
Yzeure	1–1	0–4	2–0	0–3	1–0	0–2		1–2	4–1	1–1	6–2	2–0
Paris Saint-Germain	3–0	1–0	5–0	0–0	6–0	1–2	4–0		2–0	5–0	7–0	9–0
Saint-Étienne	2–1	0–1	1–0	0–4	0–2	0–2	2–1	0–3		2–1	2–2	4–2
Soyaux	0–1	0–3	2–2	0–7	1–0	1–1	0–0	0–1	0–1		3–2	0–0
Stade Briochin	0–1	0–6	3–1	1–4	2–1	0–5	2–1	0–5	4–5	2–1		4–5
Toulouse	1–1	1–2	2–1	1–7	2–0	0–1	1–2	0–1	1–0	0–1	3–1	

Updated to match(es) played on 16 June 2010. Source: D1 Calendar
Legend: Blue = home team win; Yellow = draw; Red = away team win.

== Top scorers ==
Le Sommer was the season's top scorer.

Rank	Scorer	Club	Goals
1	(France) Eugénie Le Sommer	Stade Briochin	19
2	(France) Marie-Laure Delie	Montpellier	18
3	(Brazil) Kátia	Lyon	17
4	(Switzerland) Lara Dickenmann	Lyon	15

== Player of the year ==
The nominees for the UNFP Female Player of the Year. The winner was determined at the annual UNFP Awards, which was held on 9 May. The winner is displayed in bold.

Player	Nationality	Club
Élise Bussaglia	France	Paris Saint-Germain
Shirley Cruz Traña	Costa Rica	Lyon
**Eugénie Le Sommer**	**France**	**Stade Briochin**
Lotta Schelin	Sweden	Lyon

== Managers ==
Club	Head coach
Hénin-Beaumont	(France) Philippe Piette
Juvisy	(France) Sandrine Mathivet
La Roche-sur-Yon	(France) Malika Bousseau
Lyon	(France) Farid Benstiti
Montigny-le-Bretonneux	(France) Catherine Jarriault
Montpellier	(France) Sarah M'Barek
Nord Allier	(France) Johnny Kari
Paris SG	(France) Camille Vaz and (France) Karine Noilhan
Saint-Étienne	(France) Hervé Didier
Soyaux	(France) Bernadette Constantin
Stade Briochin	(France) Sonia Haziraj
Toulouse	(France) Matthieu Vrilliard

== See also ==
- 2009–10 Challenge de France
