= Ingrid Boyeldieu =

French association football player (1977-2019)

Personal information
- Date of birth: 7 February 1977
- Place of birth: Chaumont-en-Vexin, France
- Date of death: 24 July 2019 (aged 42)
- Place of death: Pontoise, France
- Height: 1.63 m (5 ft 4 in)
- Position: Forward

Senior career*
Years	Team	Apps	(Gls)
1996–1997	Rouen SPO		
1997–2000	Paris Saint-Germain		
2000–2001	Évreux AC		
2001–2005	Paris Saint-Germain		
2005–2006	Hénin-Beaumont	21	(11)
2006–2007	Compiègne	20	(12)
2008–2010	Paris Saint-Germain	22	(11)
2010–2012	Herblay	22	(21)
2012–2013	Compiègne	9	(4)

International career
1997–1998	France U21	2	(0)
2003	France	4	(0)
- * Club domestic league appearances and goals

Ingrid Boyeldieu (7 February 1977 – 24 July 2019) was a French international footballer who played for Paris Saint-Germain as a centre-forward.
