= Candice Prévost =

French footballer (born 1983)

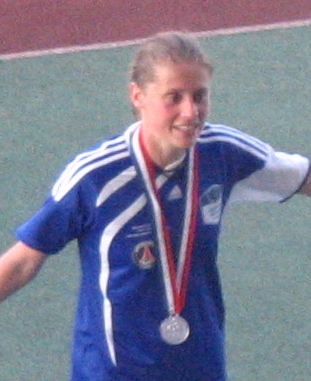
- Candice Prévost

Personal information
- Full name: Candice Prévost
- Date of birth: 24 June 1983 (age 43)
- Place of birth: Évreux, France
- Height: 1.68 m (5 ft 6 in)
- Position: Midfielder

Team information
- Current team: Paris Saint-Germain
- Number: 14

Youth career
- 1998–2003: Évreux

Senior career*
Years	Team	Apps	(Gls)
2003–2012	Paris Saint-Germain	128	(27)

International career^{‡}
2008–	France	4	(0)
- * Club domestic league appearances and goals as of 7 May 2010 (UTC) ‡ National team caps and goals as of 7 May 2010 (UTC)

Candice Prévost (born 24 June 1983) is a former French football player who last played for Paris Saint-Germain of the Division 1 Féminine. She played as an attacking midfielder. Prévost was a member of the France women's national football team making her debut in 2008.

In 2012 she ended her career.
