= AS Montigny-le-Bretonneux =

- Full name: Association Sportive de Montigny-le-Bretonneux
- Nickname: ASMB
- Founded: 1974
- Ground: Parc des Sports de la Couldre
- President: (France) Didier Moller
- Manager: (France) Catherine Jarriault
- League: D1 Féminine
- 2008–2009: 1st, D2 Féminine (Group B)
Home colours	Away colours

AS Montigny-le-Bretonneux (Association Sportive de Montigny-le-Bretonneux) are a French football club founded in 1974. They currently play in D1 Féminine and are based in Montigny-le-Bretonneux.

== History ==
The club was founded in 1974 and won promotion to D1 Féminine following the conclusion of the 2008–2009 season.

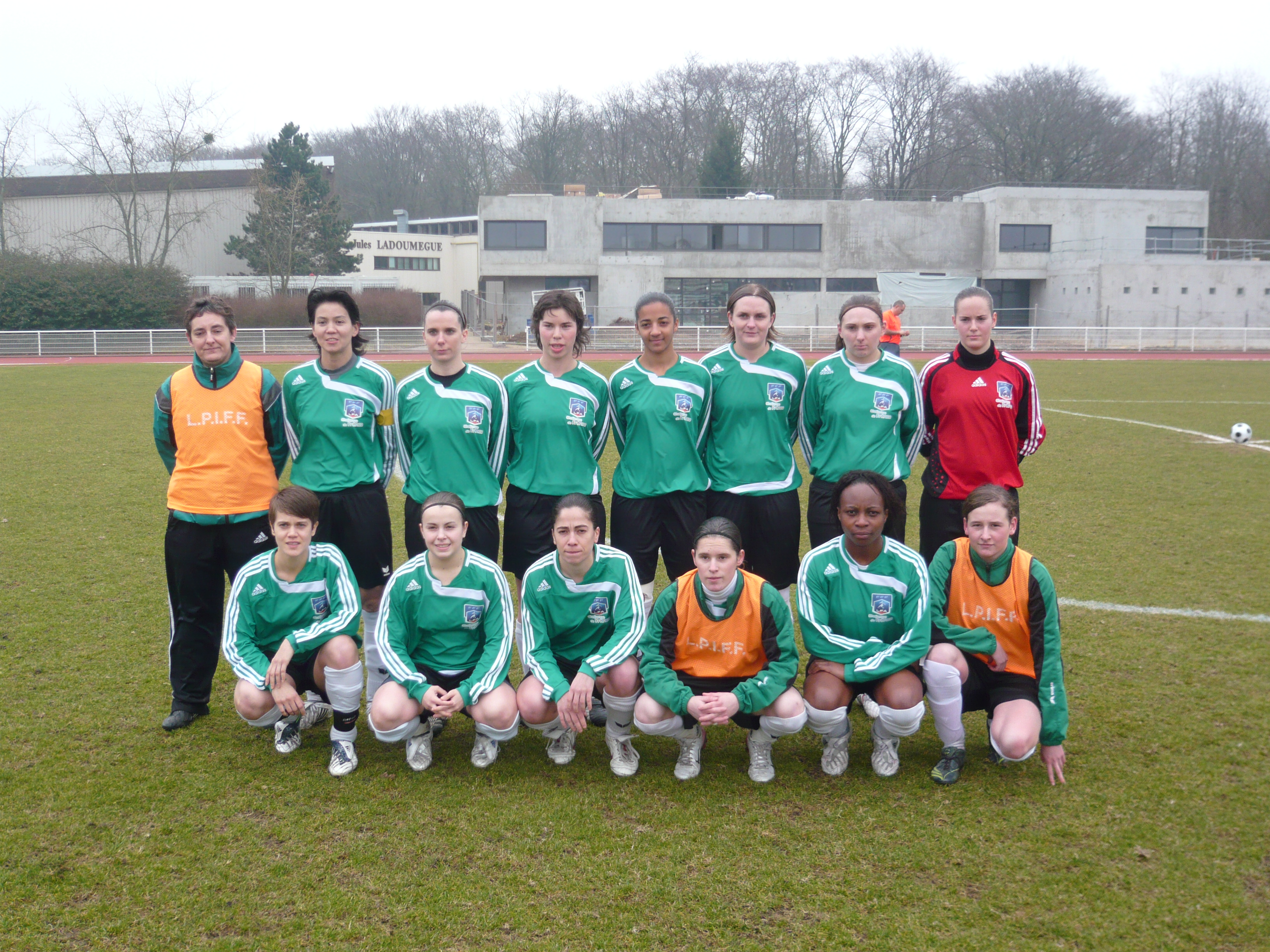
ASMB in February 2009 in the Challenge de France.

== Honours ==
- D2 Féminine Champion: 2009
- Coupe de Paris Winners: 2005, 2007, 2009
- Coupe des Yvelines Winners: 1992, 1993, 1994, 1997, 2003, 2005, 2007
