= Nora Coton-Pélagie =

French footballer (born 1988)

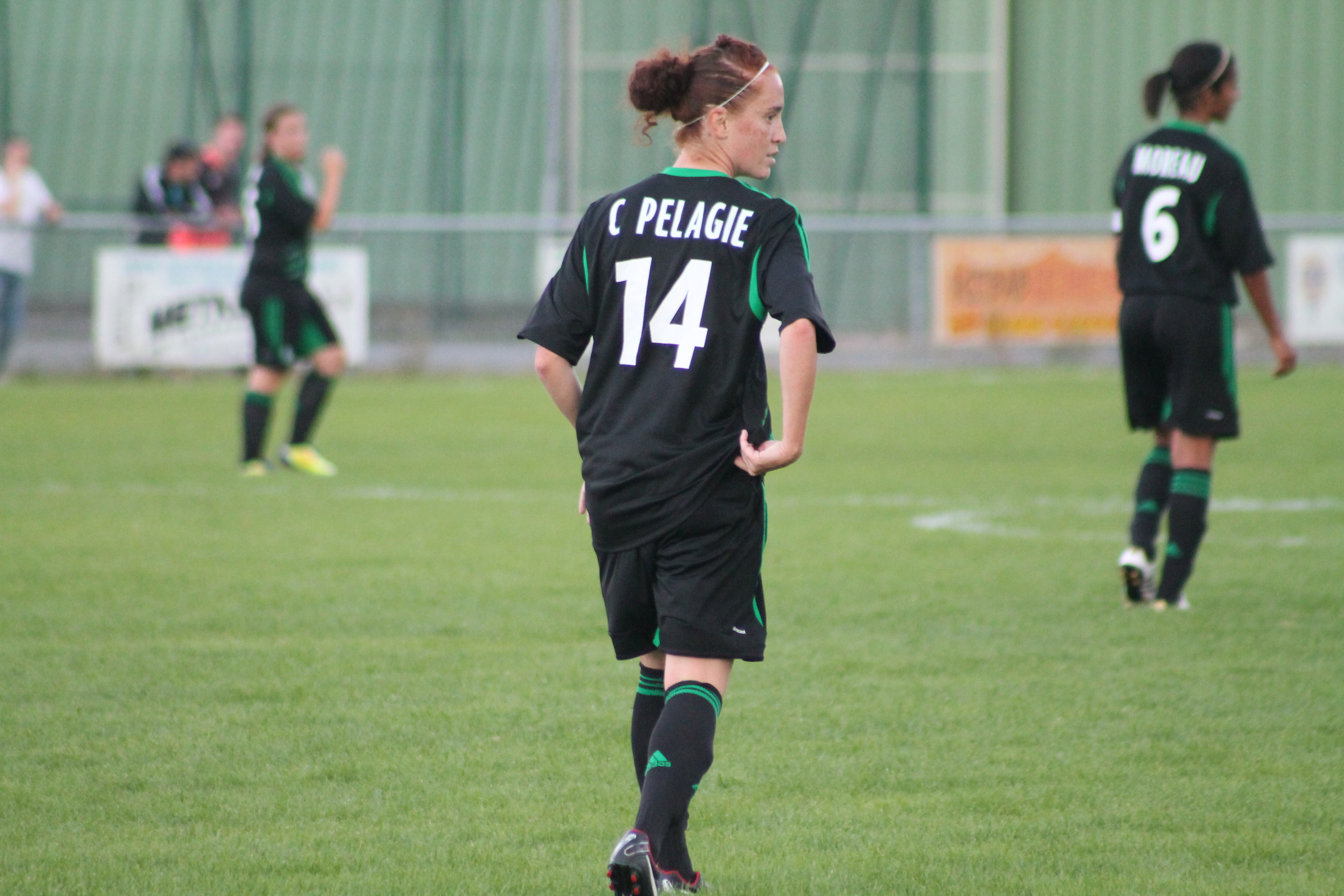
- Coton-Pélagie in 2013

Personal information
- Date of birth: 22 April 1988 (age 38)
- Place of birth: Les Lilas, France
- Height: 1.64 m (5 ft 5 in)
- Position: Midfielder

Youth career
- 1996–2001: Les Lilas
- 2001–2004: Le Blanc-Mesnil

Senior career*
Years	Team	Apps	(Gls)
2004–2007	CNFE Clairefontaine	34	(7)
2007–2008	Soyaux	20	(9)
2008–2012	Paris Saint-Germain	75	(10)
2012–2013	Issy	18	(7)
2013–2015	Saint-Étienne	30	(5)
2015–2020	Marseille	85	(17)
2020–2021	Nancy	2	(0)
2021–2023	Le Havre	42	(9)

International career^{‡}
2005	France U17	4	(0)
2006	France U19	11	(2)
2008	France U20	7	(2)
- * Club domestic league appearances and goals as of 16 September 2016 (UTC) ‡ National team caps and goals as of 16 September 2016 (UTC)

Nora Coton-Pélagie (born 22 April 1988) is a French football player. She plays as an attacking midfielder and is a former women's youth international having played at all levels. Coton-Pélagie played at both the 2006 UEFA Women's Under-19 Championship and 2008 FIFA U-20 Women's World Cup where she formed excellent partnerships with current senior internationals Eugénie Le Sommer and Marie-Laure Delie. She is the daughter of Bruno Coton-Pélagie, who is currently the manager of Championnat de France amateur 2 club FC Les Lilas.

== Career ==
Coton-Pélagie began playing football at the club where her father coached and he brother played as amateur, FC Les Lilas. She played in the lower levels of French football with Blanc-Mesnil and CNFE Clairefontaine before joining D1 sides ASJ Soyaux and Paris Saint-Germain.

Coton-Pélagie joined D2 side Olympique de Marseille, and helped the club gain promotion to D1. In 2020, she joined the feminine squad of AS Nancy.

She retired from her playing career in June 2023.
