= OL Lyonnes in European football =

Overview of Olympique Lyonnais Féminin's role in European football

- Club: OL Lyonnes
- Seasons played: 20
- Most appearances: Wendie Renard (138)
- Top scorer: Ada Hegerberg (65)
- First entry: 2007–08 UEFA Women's Cup
- Latest entry: 2026–27 UEFA Women's Champions League

Titles
- Champions League: 8

OL Lyonnes is a French women's football club based in Lyon, France.

== History ==
Olympique Lyonnais reached the UEFA Women's Champions League Final for the first time during the 2009–10, where they lost on penalties to Turbine Potsdam. The following year, Olympique Lyonnais returned to final and faced Turbine Potsdam again, this time defeating them 2–0 to win their first UEFA Women's Champions League title.

=== Matches ===
As of match played 11 November 2026

Season	Round	Opponents	Away	Home	Agg.
2007–08	First qualifying round	(Slovakia) Slovan Duslo Šaľa	12–0	–	–
2007–08	First qualifying round	(North Macedonia) Škiponjat Struga (Host)	10–0	–	–
2007–08	First qualifying round	(Bosnia and Herzegovina) Sarajevo	7–0	–	–
2007–08	Second qualifying round	(Denmark) Brøndby	–	0–0	–
2007–08	Second qualifying round	(Norway) Kolbotn	–	1–0	–
2007–08	Second qualifying round	(Czech Republic) Sparta Prague	–	2–1	–
2007–08	Quarter-final	(England) Arsenal	3–2	0–0 ^{f}	3–2
2007–08	Semi-final	(Sweden) Umeå	0–0	1–1 ^{f}	1–1 (a)
2008–09	Second qualifying round	(Austria) Neulengbach	–	8–0	–
2008–09	Second qualifying round	(Switzerland) Zürich	–	7–1	–
2008–09	Second qualifying round	(England) Arsenal	–	3–0	–
2008–09	Quarter-final	(Italy) Verona	5–0 ^{f}	4–1	9–1
2008–09	Semi-final	(Germany) Duisburg	1–3	1–1 ^{f}	2–4
2009–10	Round of 32	(Serbia) Mašinac Niš	1–0 ^{f}	5–0	6–0
2009–10	Round of 16	(Denmark) Fortuna Hjørring	1–0 ^{f}	5–0	6–0
2009–10	Quarter-final	(Italy) Torres Sassari	0–1	3–0 ^{f}	3–1
2009–10	Semi-final	(Sweden) Umeå	0–0	3–2 ^{f}	3–2
2009–10	Final	(Germany) Turbine Potsdam	0–0 (a.e.t.) (6–7 p) ( (Spain) Getafe)		
2010–11	Round of 32	(Netherlands) AZ	2–1 ^{f}	8–0	10–1
2010–11	Round of 16	(Russia) Rossiyanka Khimki	6–1 ^{f}	5–0	11–1
2010–11	Quarter-final	(Russia) Zvezda Perm	0–0 ^{f}	1–0	1–0
2010–11	Semi-final	(England) Arsenal	3–2	2–0 ^{f}	5–2
2010–11	Final	(Germany) Turbine Potsdam	2–0 ( (England) London)		
2011–12	Round of 32	(Romania) Olimpia Cluj-Napoca	9–0 ^{f}	3–0	12–0
2011–12	Round of 16	(Czech Republic) Sparta Prague	6–0 ^{f}	6–0	12–0
2011–12	Quarter-final	(Denmark) Brøndby	4–0	4–0 ^{f}	8–0
2011–12	Semi-final	(Germany) Turbine Potsdam	0–0	5–1 ^{f}	5–1
2011–12	Final	(Germany) Frankfurt	2–0 ( (Germany) Munich)		
2012–13	Round of 32	(Finland) PK-35 Vantaa	7–0 ^{f}	5–0	12–0
2012–13	Round of 16	(Russia) Zorky Krasnogorsk	9–0 ^{f}	2–0	11–0
2012–13	Quarter-final	(Sweden) Rosengård Malmö	3–0	5–0 ^{f}	8–0
2012–13	Semi-final	(France) Juvisy	6–1	3–0 ^{f}	9–1
2012–13	Final	(Germany) Wolfsburg	0–1 ( (England) London)		
2013–14	Round of 32	(Netherlands) Twente Enschede	4–0 ^{f}	6–0	10–0
2013–14	Round of 16	(Germany) Turbine Potsdam	1–0 ^{f}	1–2	2–2 (a)
2014–15	Round of 32	(Italy) Brescia	5–0 ^{f}	9–0	14–0
2014–15	Round of 16	(France) Paris Saint-Germain	1–1 ^{f}	0–1	1–2
2015–16	Round of 32	(Poland) Medyk Konin	6–0 ^{f}	3–0	9–0
2015–16	Round of 16	(Spain) Atlético Madrid	3–1 ^{f}	6–0	9–1
2015–16	Quarter-final	(Czech Republic) Slavia Prague	0–0	9–1 ^{f}	9–1
2015–16	Semi-final	(France) Paris Saint-Germain	1–0	7–0 ^{f}	8–0
2015–16	Final	(Germany) Wolfsburg	1–1 (a.e.t.) (4–3 p) ( (Italy) Reggio Emilia)		
2016–17	Round of 32	(Norway) Avaldsnes	5–2 ^{f}	5–0	10–2
2016–17	Round of 16	(Switzerland) Zürich	9–0	8–0 ^{f}	17–0
2016–17	Quarter-final	(Germany) Wolfsburg	2–0 ^{f}	0–1	2–1
2016–17	Semi-final	(England) Manchester City	3–1 ^{f}	0–1	3–2
2016–17	Final	(France) Paris Saint-Germain	0–0 (a.e.t.) (7–6 p) ( (Wales) Cardiff)		
2017–18	Round of 32	(Poland) Medyk Konin	5–0 ^{f}	9–0	14–0
2017–18	Round of 16	(Kazakhstan) BIIK Shymkent	7–0 ^{f}	9–0	16–0
2017–18	Quarter-final	(Spain) Barcelona	1–0	2–1 ^{f}	3–1
2017–18	Semi-final	(England) Manchester City	0–0 ^{f}	1–0	1–0
2017–18	Final	(Germany) Wolfsburg	4–1 (a.e.t.) ( (Ukraine) Kyiv)		
2018–19	Round of 32	(Norway) Avaldsnes	2–0 ^{f}	5–0	7–0
2018–19	Round of 16	(Netherlands) Ajax Amsterdam	4–0 ^{f}	9–0	13–0
2018–19	Quarter-final	(Germany) Wolfsburg	4–2	2–1 ^{f}	6–3
2018–19	Semi-final	(England) Chelsea	1–1	2–1 ^{f}	3–2
2018–19	Final	(Spain) Barcelona	4–1 ( (Hungary) Budapest)		
2019–20	Round of 32	(Russia) Ryazan-VDV	9–0 ^{f}	7–0	16–0
2019–20	Round of 16	(Denmark) Fortuna Hjørring	4–0 ^{f}	7–0	11–0
2019–20	Quarter-final	(Germany) Bayern Munich	2–1 ( (Spain) Bilbao)		
2019–20	Semi-final	(France) Paris Saint-Germain	1–0 ( (Spain) Bilbao)		
2019–20	Final	(Germany) Wolfsburg	3–1 ( (Spain) San Sebastián)		
2020–21	Round of 32	(Italy) Juventus	3–2 ^{f}	3–0	6–2
2020–21	Round of 16	(Denmark) Brøndby	3–1	2–0 ^{f}	5–1
2020–21	Quarter-final	(France) Paris Saint-Germain	1–0 ^{f}	1–2	2–2 (a)
2021–22	Round 2	(Spain) Levante	2–1 ^{f}	2–1	4–2
2021–22	Group D	(Germany) Bayern Munich	0–1	2–1	1st
2021–22	Group D	(Portugal) Benfica	5–0	5–0	1st
2021–22	Group D	(Sweden) BK Häcken	3–0	4–0	1st
2021–22	Quarter-final	(Italy) Juventus	1–2 ^{f}	3–1	4–3
2021–22	Semi-final	(France) Paris Saint-Germain	2–1	3–2 ^{f}	5–3
2021–22	Final	(Spain) Barcelona	3–1 ( (Italy) Turin)		
2022–23	Group C	(England) Arsenal	1–0	1–5	2nd
2022–23	Group C	(Italy) Juventus	1–1	0–0	2nd
2022–23	Group C	(Switzerland) Zürich	3–0	4–0	2nd
2022–23	Quarter-final	(England) Chelsea	2–1 (a.e.t.)	0–1 ^{f}	2–2 (3–4 p)
2023–24	Group B	(Czech Republic) Slavia Prague	9–0	2–2	1st
2023–24	Group B	(Austria) St. Pölten	7–0	2–0	1st
2023–24	Group B	(Norway) Brann	2–2	3–1	1st
2023–24	Quarter-final	(Portugal) Benfica	2–1 ^{f}	4–1	6–2
2023–24	Semi-final	(France) Paris Saint-Germain	2–1	3–2 ^{f}	5–3
2023–24	Final	(Spain) Barcelona	0–2 ( (Spain) Bilbao)		
2024–25	Group A	(Turkey) Galatasaray	3–0	6–0	1st
2024–25	Group A	(Germany) VfL Wolfsburg	1–0	2–0	1st
2024–25	Group A	(Italy) AS Roma	4–1	3–0	1st
2024–25	Quarter-final	(Germany) Bayern Munich	4–1	2–0^{f}	6–1
2024–25	Semi-final	(England) Arsenal	1–4	2–1^{f}	3–5
2025–26	League phase	(England) Arsenal	—N/a	2–1	2nd
2025–26	League phase	(Austria) SKN St. Pölten	3–0	—N/a	2nd
2025–26	League phase	(Germany) VfL Wolfsburg	3–1	—N/a	2nd
2025–26	League phase	(Italy) Juventus	—N/a	3–3	2nd
2025–26	League phase	(England) Manchester United	—N/a	3–0	2nd
2025–26	League phase	(Spain) Atlético Madrid	4–0	—N/a	2nd
2025–26	Quarter-final	(Germany) Wolfsburg	0–1^{f}	4–0	4–1
2025–26	Semi-final	(England) Arsenal	1–2^{f}	3-1	4-3
2025–26	Final	(Spain) Barcelona	0–4 ( (Norway) Oslo)		
2026–27	League phase	(Switzerland) Servette Chênois	—N/a	8–0	
2026–27	League phase	(England) Chelsea	0–0	—N/a	
2026–27	League phase	(Italy) Inter Milan	6–0	—N/a	
2026–27	League phase	(Italy) Juventus	—N/a	6–0	
2026–27	League phase	(England) Arsenal	—N/a		
2026–27	League phase	(Sweden) BK Häcken		—N/a	

^{f} First leg.

== Player statistics ==
=== Appearances ===
As of match played 11 November 2026

	Name	Years	UEFA Champions League	Total	Ratio
1	(France) Wendie Renard	2006–Present	138 (40)	138 (40)	0.29
2	(France) Eugénie Le Sommer	2010–2025	102 (50)	102 (50)	0.49
3	(France) Amandine Henry	2007-2016, 2018-2023	83 (12)	83 (12)	0.14
3	(Norway) Ada Hegerberg	2014–Present	83 (65)	83 (65)	0.78
5	(France) Amel Majri	2010–2025	79 (18)	79 (18)	0.23
6	(France) Sarah Bouhaddi	2009–2022	76 (0)	76 (0)	0
7	(France) Selma Bacha	2017–Present	71 (2)	71 (2)	0.03
8	(France) Camille Abily	2006-2009, 2010-2018	67 (43)	67 (43)	0.64
9	(France) Louisa Cadamuro	2007-2016	66 (29)	66 (29)	0.44
10	(France) Élodie Thomis	2007-2018	64 (15)	64 (15)	0.23
11	(France) Delphine Cascarino	2015-2024	57 (9)	57 (9)	0.16
12	(Germany) Dzsenifer Marozsán	2016–2025	56 (9)	56 (9)	0.16
13	(Japan) Saki Kumagai	2013-2021	54 (8)	54 (8)	0.15
14	(Sweden) Lotta Schelin	2008-2016	53 (41)	53 (41)	0.77
14	(Netherlands) Damaris Egurrola	2021–Present	53 (1)	53 (1)	0.02
16	(France) Griedge Mbock Bathy	2015-2024	51 (7)	51 (7)	0.14
17	(Chile) Christiane Endler	2021–Present	50 (0)	50 (0)	0
18	(France) Corine Franco	2008-2018	45 (6)	45 (6)	0.13
19	(Switzerland) Lara Dickenmann	2009-2015	43 (9)	43 (9)	0.21
19	(United States) Lindsey Heaps	2022-2023, 2023–2026	4£ (3)	43 (3)	0.07
21	(Australia) Ellie Carpenter	2019–2025	40 (0)	40 (0)	0
22	(France) Laura Georges	2007-2013	38 (2)	38 (2)	0.05
23	(France) Sonia Bompastor	2006-2009, 2010-2013	37 (8)	37 (8)	0.22
23	(Costa Rica) Shirley Cruz	2006-2012	37 (5)	37 (5)	0.14
25	(France) Kadeisha Buchanan	2017-2022	35 (3)	35 (3)	0.09
26	(France) Aurélie Kaci	2006-2012, 2015-2017	32 (0)	32 (0)	0
26	(France) Sabrina Viguier	2010-2014	32 (0)	32 (0)	0
28	(Netherlands) Daniëlle van de Donk	2021–2025	31 (5)	31 (5)	0.16
28	(France) Kadidiatou Diani	2023–2026	31 (16)	31 (16)	0.52
30	(France) Melvine Malard	2017-2024	30 (12)	30 (12)	0.4
31	(Haiti) Melchie Dumornay	2023–Present	28 (16)	28 (16)	0.57
31	(France) Vicki Bècho	2020–Present	28 (4)	28 (4)	0.14
33	(Canada) Vanessa Gilles	2022–2025	26 (6)	26 (6)	0.23
34	(Belgium) Janice Cayman	2019-2023	24 (3)	24 (3)	0.13
34	(France) Perle Morroni	2021-2024	24 (1)	24 (1)	0.04
36	(England) Lucy Bronze	2017-2020	23 (3)	23 (3)	0.13
37	(France) Sandrine Brétigny	2001-2012	22 (9)	22 (9)	0.41
38	(Brazil) Simone Jatobá	2005-2010	21 (2)	21 (2)	0.1
38	(Brazil) Kátia	2007-2010	21 (13)	21 (13)	0.62
38	(Malawi) Tabitha Chawinga	2024–Present	21 (5)	21 (5)	0.24
41	(France) Sandrine Dusang	2003-2011	19 (1)	19 (1)	0.05
41	(France) Alice Sombath	2021–2026	19 (0)	19 (0)	0
43	(Brazil) Catarina Macario	2021-2023	17 (10)	17 (10)	0.59
43	(Germany) Sara Däbritz	2022–2025	17 (6)	17 (6)	0.35
45	(Netherlands) Shanice van de Sanden	2017-2020	15 (0)	15 (0)	0
45	(Germany) Jule Brand	2025–Present	15 (3)	15 (3)	0.2
47	(Germany) Pauline Bremer	2015-2017	14 (2)	14 (2)	0.14
47	(Denmark) Signe Bruun	2021-2023	14 (3)	14 (3)	0.21
47	(United States) Lily Yohannes	2025–Present	14 (4)	14 (4)	0.29
47	(France) Marie-Antoinette Katoto	2025–Present	14 (8)	14 (8)	0.57
51	(Norway) Ingrid Syrstad Engen	2025–Present	13 (0)	13 (0)	0
52	(France) Laëtitia Tonazzi	2012-2014	12 (8)	12 (8)	0.67
52	(France) Emelyne Laurent	2017-2022	12 (0)	12 (0)	0
52	(England) Nikita Parris	2019-2021	12 (6)	12 (6)	0.5
55	(Norway) Ingvild Stensland	2009-2011	11 (1)	11 (1)	0.09
55	(France) Élise Bussaglia	2012-2015	11 (1)	11 (1)	0.09
55	(United States) Korbin Shrader	2025–Present	11 (2)	11 (2)	0.18
58	(France) Véronique Pons	2007–2011	10 (0)	10 (0)	0
58	(France) Inès Benyahia	2021–Present	11 (1)	11 (1)	0.09
60	(Denmark) Dorte Dalum Jensen	2008–2009	9 (0)	9 (0)	0
60	(United States) Megan Rapinoe	2013-2014	9 (3)	9 (3)	0.33
60	(France) Claire Lavogez	2015-2018	9 (3)	9 (3)	0.33
60	(Canada) Ashley Lawrence	2025–Present	9 (0)	9 (0)	0
60	(Brazil) Tarciane	2025–Present	9 (0)	9 (0)	0
65	(France) Sakina Karchaoui	2020–2021	8 (0)	8 (0)	0
65	(Iceland) Sara Björk Gunnarsdóttir	2020-2022	8 (1)	8 (1)	0.13
65	(Denmark) Sofie Svava	2024–2026	8 (0)	8 (0)	0
68	(France) Laure Lepailleur	2006–2007	7 (0)	7 (0)	0
68	(Norway) Isabell Herlovsen (Note: Herlovsen was born in West Germany, but went on to represent Norway at international level.)	2009–2010	7 (0)	7 (0)	0
68	(France) Jessica Houara	2016–2018	7 (0)	7 (0)	0
68	(Sweden) Caroline Seger	2016-2017	7 (1)	7 (1)	0.14
68	(Wales) Jess Fishlock	2018–2019	7 (0)	7 (0)	0
73	(France) Emmeline Mainguy (Note: Mainguy was born in France, but went on to represent Martinique at international level after leaving Lyon.)	2007–2008	6 (0)	6 (0)	0
73	(France) Hoda Lattaf	2006–2008	6 (0)	6 (0)	0
73	(Brazil) Rosana	2011–2012	6 (0)	6 (0)	0
73	(France) Mylaine Tarrieu	2015-2018	6 (2)	6 (2)	0.33
73	(France) Kheira Hamraoui	2006–2008	6 (0)	6 (0)	0
78	(Norway) Christine Colombo Nilsen	2009–2010	5 (0)	5 (0)	0
78	(Sweden) Amelie Rybäck	2010	5 (0)	5 (0)	0
78	(Japan) Ami Otaki	2012-2013	5 (1)	5 (1)	0.2
78	(United States) Alex Morgan	2017	5 (0)	5 (0)	0
78	(England) Izzy Christiansen	2018-2019	5 (1)	5 (1)	0.2
83	(Norway) Bente Nordby	2008–2009	4 (0)	4 (0)	0
83	(France) Meline Gerard	2008–2009	4 (0)	4 (0)	0
83	(France) Ève Périsset	2012–2016	4 (0)	4 (0)	0
83	(England) Jodie Taylor	2020–2021	4 (0)	4 (0)	0
83	(Germany) Mala Grohs	2026–Present	4 (0)	4 (0)	0
83	(Spain) Salma Paralluelo	2026–Present	4 (0)	4 (0)	0
89	(France) Alix Faye-Chellali	2005–2009	3 (0)	3 (0)	0
89	(France) Coralie Ducher	2004–2010	3 (0)	3 (0)	0
89	(France) Celine Deville	2011–2013	3 (0)	3 (0)	0
89	(France) Makan Mouchou Traore	2011–2013	3 (0)	3 (0)	0
89	(Portugal) Jéssica Silva	2019-2021	3 (1)	3 (1)	0.33
89	(United States) Sofia Huerta	2024–2025	3 (0)	3 (0)	0
95	(France) Sarah Chorfa	2003–2013	2 (0)	2 (0)	0
95	(France) Laura Agard	2012–2013	2 (0)	2 (0)	0
95	(Germany) Lisa Weiß	2018–2020	2 (0)	2 (0)	0
95	(Switzerland) Sally Julini	2020–2024	2 (0)	2 (0)	0
95	(France) Liana Joseph	2025–Present	2 (0)	2 (0)	0
95	(Scotland) Caroline Weir	2026–Present	2 (0)	2 (0)	0
95	(France) Wassa Sangaré	2023–Present	2 (0)	2 (0)	0
102	(France) Emilie Gonssollin	2004–2008	1 (0)	1 (0)	0
102	(France) Alexandra Muci	2005–2009	1 (0)	1 (0)	0
102	(France) Laura Martinez	2007–2008	1 (0)	1 (0)	0
102	(France) Océane Cairaty	2005–2010	1 (0)	1 (0)	0
102	(France) Pauline Peyraud-Magnin	2011–2014, 2017–2018	1 (0)	1 (0)	0
102	(France) Saida Akherraze	2008–2011	1 (0)	1 (0)	0
102	(France) Mélissa Plaza	2013–2015	1 (0)	1 (0)	0
102	(France) Lucie Pingeon	2014–2016	1 (0)	1 (0)	0
102	(China) Wang Fei	2015	1 (0)	1 (0)	0
102	(France) Maëlle Garbino	2014–2016	1 (0)	1 (0)	0
102	(Germany) Carolin Simon	2018–2019	1 (0)	1 (0)	0
102	(France) Éva Kouache	2015–2020	1 (0)	1 (0)	0
102	(England) Alex Greenwood	2019–2020	1 (0)	1 (0)	0
102	(France) Grace Kazadi	2020–2022	1 (0)	1 (0)	0
102	(France) Manon Revelli	2016–2020	1 (0)	1 (0)	0
102	(France) Laurine Baga	2018–2022	1 (0)	1 (0)	0
102	(France) Inès Jaurena	2022–2023	1 (0)	1 (0)	0
102	(Germany) Laura Benkarth	2023–2025	1 (0)	1 (0)	0
102	(France) Julie Swierot	2023–Present	1 (0)	1 (0)	0
102	(Australia) Teagan Micah	2025–Present	1 (0)	1 (0)	0
102	(Sweden) Elma Junttila Nelhage	2025–Present	1 (0)	1 (0)	0
102	(France) Sofia Bekhaled	2023–Present	1 (0)	1 (0)	0

=== Goalscorers ===
As of match played 11 November 2026

	Name	Years	UEFA Champions League	Total	Ratio
1	(Norway) Ada Hegerberg	2014–Present	65 (83)	65 (83)	0.78
2	(France) Eugénie Le Sommer	2010–2025	50 (102)	50 (102)	0.49
3	(France) Camille Abily	2006-2009, 2010-2018	43 (67)	43 (67)	0.64
4	(Sweden) Lotta Schelin	2008-2016	41 (53)	41 (53)	0.77
5	(France) Wendie Renard	2006–Present	40 (138)	40 (138)	0.29
6	(France) Louisa Cadamuro	2007-2016	29 (66)	29 (66)	0.44
7	(France) Amel Majri	2010–2025	18 (79)	18 (79)	0.23
8	(France) Kadidiatou Diani	2023–2026	16 (31)	16 (31)	0.52
8	(Haiti) Melchie Dumornay	2023–Present	16 (28)	16 (28)	0.57
10	(France) Élodie Thomis	2007-2018	15 (64)	15 (64)	0.23
11	(Brazil) Kátia	2007-2010	13 (21)	13 (21)	0.62
12	(France) Amandine Henry	2007-2016, 2018-2023	12 (83)	12 (83)	0.14
12	(France) Melvine Malard	2017-2024	12 (30)	12 (30)	0.4
14	(Brazil) Catarina Macario	2021-2023	10 (17)	10 (17)	0.59
14	Own goal	2007–Present	0 (167)	10 (167)	0.06
16	(France) Sandrine Brétigny	2001-2012	9 (22)	9 (22)	0.41
16	(Switzerland) Lara Dickenmann	2009-2015	9 (43)	9 (43)	0.21
16	(France) Delphine Cascarino	2015-2024	9 (57)	9 (57)	0.16
16	(Germany) Dzsenifer Marozsán	2016–2025	9 (56)	9 (56)	0.16
20	(France) Sonia Bompastor	2006-2009, 2010-2013	8 (37)	8 (37)	0.22
20	(France) Laëtitia Tonazzi	2012-2014	8 (12)	8 (12)	0.67
20	(Japan) Saki Kumagai	2013-2021	8 (54)	8 (54)	0.15
20	(France) Marie-Antoinette Katoto	2025–Present	8 (14)	8 (14)	0.57
24	(France) Griedge Mbock Bathy	2015-2024	7 (51)	7 (51)	0.14
25	(France) Corine Franco	2008-2018	6 (45)	6 (45)	0.13
25	(England) Nikita Parris	2019-2021	6 (12)	6 (12)	0.5
25	(Canada) Vanessa Gilles	2022–2025	6 (26)	6 (26)	0.23
25	(Germany) Sara Däbritz	2022–2025	6 (17)	6 (17)	0.35
29	(Costa Rica) Shirley Cruz	2006-2012	5 (37)	5 (37)	0.14
29	(Netherlands) Daniëlle van de Donk	2021–2025	5 (31)	5 (31)	0.16
29	(Malawi) Tabitha Chawinga	2024–Present	5 (21)	5 (21)	0.24
32	(France) Vicki Bècho	2020–Present	4 (28)	4 (28)	0.14
32	(United States) Lily Yohannes	2025–Present	4 (14)	4 (14)	0.29
34	(United States) Megan Rapinoe	2013-2014	3 (9)	3 (9)	0.33
34	(France) Claire Lavogez	2015-2018	3 (9)	3 (9)	0.33
34	(England) Lucy Bronze	2017-2020	3 (23)	3 (23)	0.13
34	(France) Kadeisha Buchanan	2017-2022	3 (35)	3 (35)	0.09
34	(Belgium) Janice Cayman	2019-2023	3 (24)	3 (24)	0.13
34	(Denmark) Signe Bruun	2021-2023	3 (14)	3 (14)	0.21
34	(United States) Lindsey Heaps	2022-2023, 2023–2026	3 (42)	3 (42)	0.07
34	(Germany) Jule Brand	2025–Present	3 (14)	3 (14)	0.21
42	(Brazil) Simone Jatobá	2005-2010	2 (21)	2 (21)	0.1
42	(France) Laura Georges	2007-2013	2 (38)	2 (38)	0.05
42	(Germany) Pauline Bremer	2015-2017	2 (14)	2 (14)	0.14
42	(France) Mylaine Tarrieu	2015-2018	2 (6)	2 (6)	0.33
42	(France) Selma Bacha	2017–Present	2 (71)	2 (71)	0.03
42	(United States) Korbin Shrader	2025–Present	2 (11)	2 (11)	0.18
48	(France) Sandrine Dusang	2003-2011	1 (19)	1 (19)	0.05
48	(Norway) Ingvild Stensland	2009-2011	1 (11)	1 (11)	0.09
48	(Japan) Ami Otaki	2012-2013	1 (5)	1 (5)	0.2
48	(France) Élise Bussaglia	2012-2015	1 (11)	1 (11)	0.09
48	(Sweden) Caroline Seger	2016-2017	1 (7)	1 (7)	0.14
48	(England) Izzy Christiansen	2018-2019	1 (5)	1 (5)	0.2
48	(Portugal) Jéssica Silva	2019-2021	1 (3)	1 (3)	0.33
48	(Iceland) Sara Björk Gunnarsdóttir	2020-2022	1 (8)	1 (8)	0.13
48	(France) Perle Morroni	2021-2024	1 (24)	1 (24)	0.04
48	(Netherlands) Damaris Egurrola	2021–Present	1 (53)	1 (53)	0.02
48	(Netherlands) Inès Benyahia	2020–Present	1 (11)	1 (11)	0.09

=== Clean sheets ===
As of match played 11 November 2026

	Name	Years	UEFA Champions League	Total	Ratio
1	(France) Sarah Bouhaddi	2009–2022	48 (76)	48 (76)	0.63
2	(Chile) Christiane Endler	2021–Present	20 (50)	20 (50)	0.4
3	(France) Véronique Pons	2007–2011	8 (10)	8 (10)	0.8
4	(France) Emmeline Mainguy	2007–2008	4 (6)	4 (6)	0.67
4	(Germany) Mala Grohs	2026–Present	4 (4)	4 (4)	1
6	(Norway) Christine Colombo Nilsen	2009–2010	3 (5)	3 (5)	0.6
6	(France) Céline Deville	2011–2013	3 (3)	3 (3)	1
6	(France) Meline Gerard	2014–2017	3 (4)	3 (4)	0.75
9	(Germany) Lisa Weiß	2018–2020	2 (2)	2 (2)	1
10	(Norway) Bente Nordby	2008–2009	1 (4)	1 (4)	0.25
10	(France) Pauline Peyraud-Magnin	2011–2014, 2017–2018	1 (1)	1 (1)	1
10	(China) Wang Fei	2015	1 (1)	1 (1)	1
10	(Australia) Teagan Micah	2025–Present	1 (1)	1 (1)	1
14	(France) Alexandra Muci	2005–2009	0 (1)	0 (1)	0
14	(Germany) Laura Benkarth	2023–2025	0 (1)	0 (1)	0

== Overall record ==
=== By competition ===
As of match played 11 November 2026

Competition	GP	W	D	L	GF	GA	+/-
UEFA Champions League	167	129	21	17	560	96	+464

=== By country ===
As of match played 11 November 2026

Country	Pld	W	D	L	GF	GA	GD	Win%
Austria	4	4	0	0	20	0	+20	100.00
Bosnia and Herzegovina	1	1	0	0	7	0	+7	100.00
Czech Republic	7	5	2	0	34	4	+30	71.43
Denmark	9	8	1	0	30	1	+29	88.89
England	22	13	4	5	34	24	+10	59.09
Finland	2	2	0	0	12	0	+12	100.00
France	14	10	2	2	32	12	+20	71.43
Germany	27	17	4	6	49	21	+28	62.96
Italy	17	12	3	2	59	12	+47	70.59
Kazakhstan	2	2	0	0	16	0	+16	100.00
Netherlands	6	6	0	0	33	1	+32	100.00
North Macedonia	1	1	0	0	10	0	+10	100.00
Norway	7	6	1	0	23	5	+18	85.71
Poland	4	4	0	0	23	0	+23	100.00
Portugal	4	4	0	0	16	2	+14	100.00
Romania	2	2	0	0	12	0	+12	100.00
Russia	8	7	1	0	39	1	+38	87.50
Serbia	2	2	0	0	6	0	+6	100.00
Slovakia	1	1	0	0	12	0	+12	100.00
Spain	11	9	0	2	27	12	+15	81.82
Sweden	8	5	3	0	19	3	+16	62.50
Switzerland	6	6	0	0	39	1	+38	100.00
Turkey	2	2	0	0	9	0	+9	100.00

=== By club ===
As of match played 11 November 2026

Opponent	Played	Won	Drawn	Lost	For	Against	Difference	Ratio
(Austria) Neulengbach	1	1	0	0	8	0	+8	100.00
(Austria) SKN St. Pölten	3	3	0	0	12	0	+12	100.00
(Bosnia and Herzegovina) Sarajevo	1	1	0	0	7	0	+7	100.00
(Czech Republic) Sparta Prague	3	3	0	0	14	1	+13	100.00
(Czech Republic) Slavia Prague	4	2	2	0	20	3	+17	50.00
(Denmark) Brøndby	5	4	1	0	13	1	+12	80.00
(Denmark) Fortuna Hjørring	4	4	0	0	17	0	+17	100.00
(England) Arsenal	12	8	1	3	22	18	+4	66.67
(England) Chelsea	5	2	2	1	5	4	+1	40.00
(England) Manchester City	4	2	1	1	4	2	+2	50.00
(England) Manchester United	1	1	0	0	3	0	+3	100.00
(Finland) PK-35 Vantaa	2	2	0	0	12	0	+12	100.00
(France) Juvisy	2	2	0	0	9	1	+8	100.00
(France) Paris Saint-Germain	12	8	2	2	22	10	+12	66.67
(Germany) Bayern Munich	5	4	0	1	10	4	+6	80.00
(Germany) Duisburg	2	0	1	1	2	4	−2	0.00
(Germany) Eintracht Frankfurt	1	1	0	0	2	0	+2	100.00
(Germany) Turbine Potsdam	6	3	2	1	9	3	+6	50.00
(Germany) VfL Wolfsburg	13	9	1	3	26	10	+16	69.23
(Italy) Brescia	2	2	0	0	14	0	+14	100.00
(Italy) Inter Milan	1	1	0	0	6	0	+6	100.00
(Italy) Juventus	8	4	3	1	20	9	+11	50.00
(Italy) AS Roma	2	2	0	0	7	1	+6	100.00
(Italy) Torres Sassari	2	1	0	1	3	1	+2	50.00
(Italy) Verona	2	2	0	0	9	1	+8	100.00
(Kazakhstan) BIIK Shymkent	2	2	0	0	16	1	+15	100.00
(North Macedonia) Škiponjat Struga	1	1	0	0	1	0	+1	100.00
(Netherlands) AFC Ajax	2	2	0	0	13	0	+13	100.00
(Netherlands) AZ Alkmaar	2	2	0	0	10	1	+9	100.00
(Netherlands) Twente	2	2	0	0	10	0	+10	100.00
(Norway) Avaldsnes	4	4	0	0	17	2	+15	100.00
(Norway) Brann	2	1	1	0	5	3	+2	50.00
(Norway) Kolbotn	1	1	0	0	1	0	+1	100.00
(Poland) Medyk Konin	4	4	0	0	23	0	+23	100.00
(Portugal) Benfica	4	4	0	0	16	2	+14	100.00
(Romania) Olimpia Cluj	2	2	0	0	12	0	+12	100.00
(Russia) Rossiyanka	2	2	0	0	11	1	+10	100.00
(Russia) Ryazan-VDV	2	2	0	0	16	0	+16	100.00
(Russia) Zorky Krasnogorsk	2	2	0	0	11	0	+11	100.00
(Russia) Zvezda Perm	2	1	1	0	1	0	+1	50.00
(Serbia) Mašinac Niš	2	2	0	0	6	0	+6	100.00
(Slovakia) Slovan Duslo Šaľa	1	1	0	0	12	0	+12	100.00
(Spain) Atlético Madrid	3	3	0	0	13	1	+12	100.00
(Spain) Barcelona	6	4	0	2	10	9	+1	66.67
(Spain) Levante	2	2	0	0	4	2	+2	100.00
(Sweden) BK Häcken	2	2	0	0	7	0	+7	100.00
(Sweden) Rosengård	2	2	0	0	8	0	+8	100.00
(Sweden) Umeå	4	1	3	0	4	3	+1	25.00
(Switzerland) Servette Chênois	1	1	0	0	8	0	+8	100.00
(Switzerland) Zürich	5	5	0	0	31	1	+30	100.00
(Turkey) Galatasaray	2	2	0	0	9	0	+9	100.00
