= Élodie Thomis =

French footballer (born 1986)

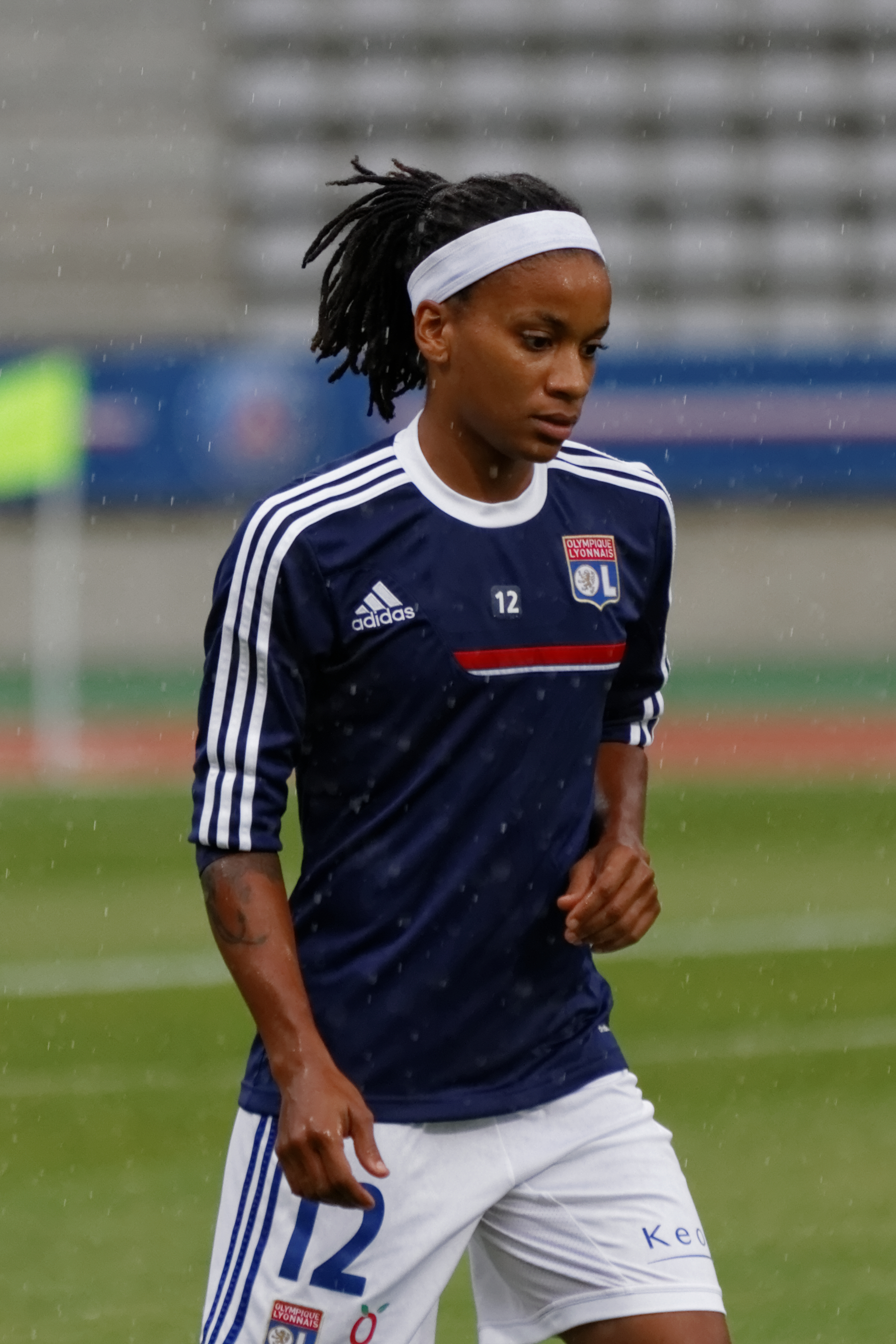
- Thomis in 2013

Personal information
- Full name: Élodie Ginette Thomis
- Date of birth: 13 August 1986 (age 40)
- Place of birth: Colombes, France
- Height: 1.67 m (5 ft 6 in)
- Positions: Winger; striker

Youth career
- 1999–2001: Épinay-sur-Seine
- 2001–2002: Colombes Féminin

Senior career*
Years	Team	Apps	(Gls)
2002–2005	CNFE Clairefontaine	51	(32)
2005–2007	Montpellier	42	(18)
2007–2018	Lyon	78	(44)

International career^{‡}
2005–2017	France	141	(32)
- * Club domestic league appearances and goals as of 15 February 2012 ‡ National team caps and goals as of 15:40, 30 July 2017 (UTC)

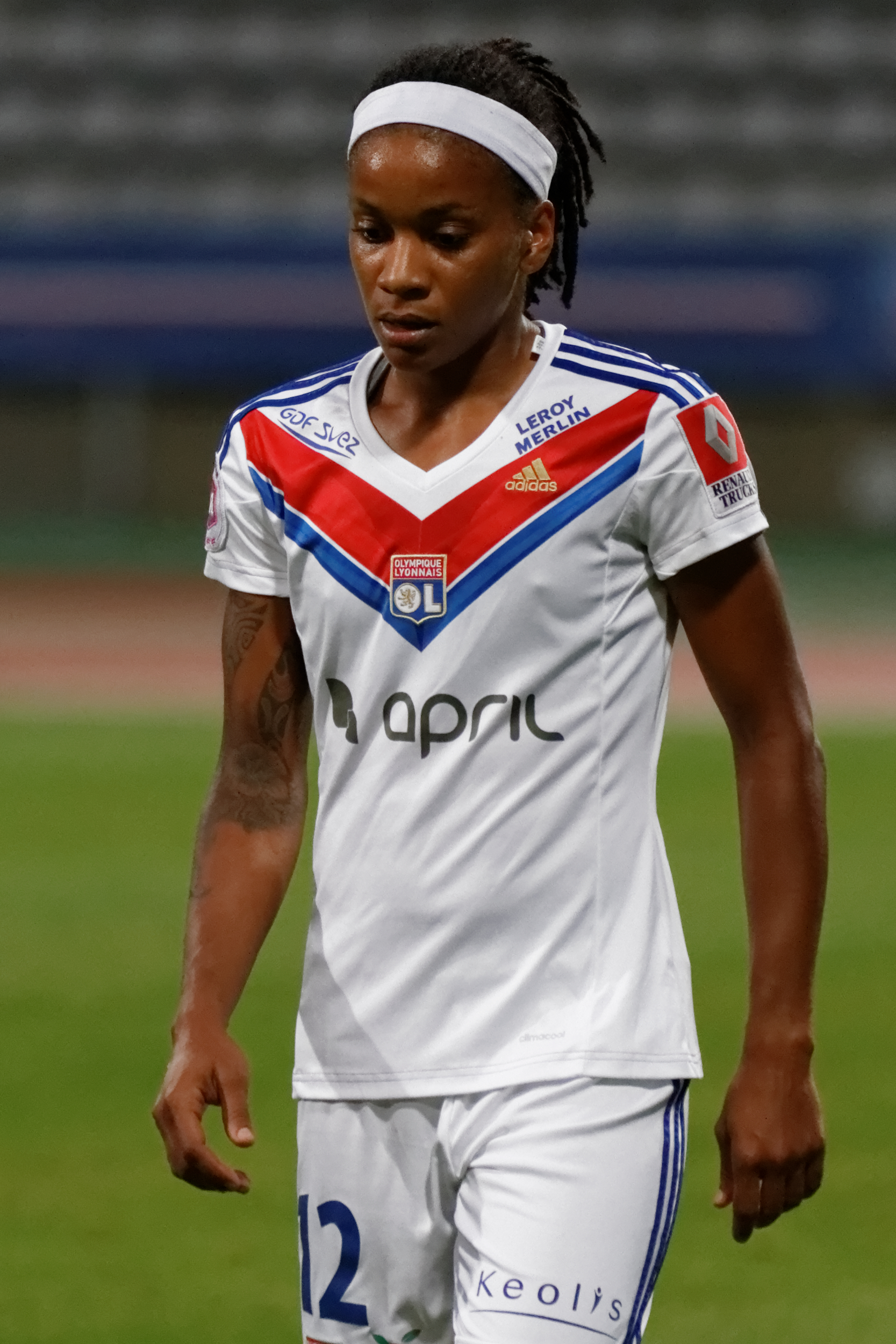

Élodie Ginette Thomis (French: [e.lɔ.di ʒi.nɛt tɔ.mis]; born 13 August 1986) is a French former football player who played for French club Lyon of the Division 1 Féminine. She played either a winger or striker and was described as a player who possesses pace comparable to that of French men's internationals Thierry Henry and Sidney Govou. Thomis is a graduate of the women's section of the Clairefontaine academy and was a French women's international having made her debut with the team in June 2005 at UEFA Women's Euro 2005 against Italy.

== Career ==
=== Early career ===
Thomis was born in the commune of Colombes, a northwestern suburb of Paris, to parents of Martiniquais heritage. She began her sporting career training as a sprinter. At the age of 13, Thomis began playing football after attending a trial for women footballers in Épinay-sur-Seine. After successfully playing for the local club, she joined Football Club Feminin de Colombes in her hometown. In 2002, Thomis was selected to attend CNFE Clairefontaine, the women's section of the Clairefontaine academy. She spent three years training at the facility alongside future domestic teammates Louisa Necib, as well as future international teammates Caroline Pizzala, Élise Bussaglia, and Laure Lepailleur. In three seasons at the academy, Thomis played in over 50 matches scoring 32 goals.

=== Montpellier and Lyon ===
After departing Clairefontaine, Thomis joined Division 1 Féminine club Montpellier. Necib later joined the club the following year. In her first season with the club, Thomis appeared in 20 league matches scoring three goals as Montpellier finished runner-up in the league to Juvisy. She also made her European debut participating in the 2005–06 UEFA Women's Cup. In the team's first leg quarter-final tie against Danish outfit Brøndby IF, Thomis scored a double, which, after a positive result in the second leg, allowed Montpellier to advanced to the semi-finals where the club was eliminated by the eventual champions 1. FFC Frankfurt. Thomis' goal output increased in the 2005–06 season scoring 15 goals in 22 matches as Montpellier claimed the Challenge de France, the women's domestic cup in France. After the season, in June 2007, rival D1 Féminine Lyon confirmed that both Thomis and Necib would be joining the club for the 2007–08 season. In her debut season at Lyon, she played in 17 league matches scoring seven goals helping the club win the league and cup double. In the 2008–09 season, Thomis appeared in 17 total matches scoring 14 goals as Lyon won the league for the third consecutive season and reached the semi-finals for the second straight season in the UEFA Women's Cup.

In the ensuing two seasons, due to injuries, Thomis was limited to only 30 appearances domestically. The striker did scored 17 goals in that span. In the re-branded UEFA Women's Champions League, Thomis made eight appearances scoring three goals as Lyon reached the final in the 2009–10 edition of the competition. Lyon was defeated by German club Turbine Potsdam in the penultimate match. In the 2010–11 edition of the Champions League, Thomis was a part of the team that won the competition defeating its nemesis Turbine Potsdam 2–0 in the final.

She left Lyon and retired after the 2017/18 season.

== International career ==
Thomis made her international debut for les Bleues on 6 June 2005 in a match against Italy. Competing for France in 2011 FIFA Women's World Cup and 2012 London Olympics Thomis helped the team reach the semi-finals in all three competitions. In 2015 FIFA Women's World Cup, Thomis helped France reach the quarter-finals where the team was eliminated by Germany on penalty shootout. Thomis has scored a total of 5 goals at these Olympics and World Cup finals.

== Career statistics ==
=== Club ===
Statistics accurate as of 14 November 2012

Club	Season	League		Cup		Continental		Total	
Club	Season	Apps	Goals	Apps	Goals	Apps	Goals	Apps	Goals
CNFE Clairefontaine	2002–03	16	4	0	0	0	0	16	4
CNFE Clairefontaine	2003–04	17	15	0	0	0	0	17	15
CNFE Clairefontaine	2004–05	18	13	0	0	0	0	18	13
CNFE Clairefontaine	Total	51	32	0	0	0	0	51	32
Montpellier	2005–06	20	3	0	0	6	2	26	5
Montpellier	2006–07	22	15	0	0	0	0	22	15
Montpellier	Total	42	18	0	0	6	2	48	20
Lyon	2007–08	17	7	5	3	10	4	32	14
Lyon	2008–09	17	12	3	4	6	2	26	18
Lyon	2009–10	16	10	3	3	8	3	27	16
Lyon	2010–11	14	7	2	3	7	1	23	11
Lyon	2011–12	21	15	6	2	7	3	34	20
Lyon	2012–13	16	12	6	1	9	1	31	14
Lyon	Total	101	63	25	16	47	14	173	93
Career total		194	113	25	16	53	16	272	145

=== International ===
(Correct as of 19 September 2012)

National team	Season	Apps	Goals
France	2004–05	2	0
France	2005–06	6	0
France	2006–07	9	1
France	2007–08	6	5
France	2008–09	9	2
France	2009–10	11	5
France	2010–11	15	4
France	2011–12	21	8
France	2012–13	2	1
Total		81	26

==== International goals ====
Goal	Date	Venue	Opponent	Score	Result	Competition
1	22 November 2006	Stade de la Libération, Boulogne-sur-Mer, France	Belgium	5–0	6–0	Friendly
2	27 October 2007	Stadion Kralj Petar I, Belgrade, Serbia	Serbia	0–5	0–8	UEFA Women's Euro 2009 qualifying
3	27 October 2007	Stadion Kralj Petar I, Belgrade, Serbia	Serbia	0–6	0–8	UEFA Women's Euro 2009 qualifying
4	31 October 2007	Stanko Mlakar Stadium, Kranj, Slovenia	Slovenia	0–2	0–2	UEFA Women's Euro 2009 qualifying
5	30 January 2008	Stade Francis Turcan, Martigues, France	Italy	6–0	6–0	Friendly
6	23 April 2008	Yiannis Pathiakakis Stadium, Akratitos, Greece	Greece	0–5	0–5	UEFA Women's Euro 2009 qualifying
7	7 March 2009	Tasos Markou Stadium, Paralimni, Cyprus	England	1–2	2–2	2009 Cyprus Cup
8	22 April 2009	Stade Gaston Gérard, Dijon, France	Switzerland	2–0	2–0	Friendly
9	12 August 2009	Stade des Grands Prés, Chartres, France	Scotland	2–0	4–0	Friendly
10	23 September 2009	Stadion NK Inter Zaprešić, Zaprešić, Croatia	Croatia	0–7	0–7	2011 FIFA Women's World Cup qualification
11	24 October 2009	Stade de Gerland, Lyon, France	Iceland	2–0	2–0	2011 FIFA Women's World Cup qualification
12	28 October 2009	Stade Jules Deschaseaux, Le Havre, France	Estonia	9–0	12–0	2011 FIFA Women's World Cup qualification
13	23 June 2010	Kadrioru Stadium, Tallinn, Estonia	Estonia	0–2	0–6	2011 FIFA Women's World Cup qualification
14	25 August 2010	Stade de l'Aube, Troyes, France	Serbia	1–0	7–0	2011 FIFA Women's World Cup qualification
15	18 June 2011	Stade de l'Épopée, Calais, France	Belgium	5–0	7–0	Friendly
16	30 June 2011	Ruhrstadion, Bochum, Germany	Canada	4–0	4–0	2011 FIFA Women's World Cup
17	16 July 2011	Rhein-Neckar-Arena, Sinsheim, Germany	Sweden	1–1	2–1	2011 FIFA Women's World Cup
18	24 August 2011	Stade Félix-Bollaert, Lens, France	Poland	1–0	2–0	Friendly
19	20 November 2011	Stade Pierre-Aliker, Fort-de-France, Martinique	Mexico	4–0	5–0	Friendly
20	4 April 2012	Stade Michel d'Ornano, Caen, France	Wales	1–0	4–0	UEFA Women's Euro 2013 qualifying
21	4 April 2012	Stade Michel d'Ornano, Caen, France	Wales	2–0	4–0	UEFA Women's Euro 2013 qualifying
22	4 April 2012	Stade Michel d'Ornano, Caen, France	Wales	3–0	4–0	UEFA Women's Euro 2013 qualifying
23	4 July 2012	Stade de la Source, Orléans, France	Romania	1–0	6–0	Friendly
24	28 July 2012	Hampden Park, Glasgow, Scotland	North Korea	2–0	5–0	2012 Summer Olympics
25	31 July 2012	St James' Park, Newcastle-upon-Tyne, England	Colombia	1–0	1–0	2012 Summer Olympics
26	15 September 2012	Stade du Roudourou, Guingamp, France	Republic of Ireland	1–0	4–0	UEFA Women's Euro 2013 qualifying
27	4 April 2013	Stade du Ray, Nice, France	Canada	1–0	1–1	Friendly
28	5 April 2014	Stade Jean-Bouin, Angers, France	Kazakhstan	3–0	7–0	2015 FIFA Women's World Cup qualification
29	9 April 2014	MMArena, Le Mans, France	Austria	3–0	3–1	2015 FIFA Women's World Cup qualification
30	7 May 2014	Stade Léo Lagrange, Besançon, France	Hungary	1–0	4–0	2015 FIFA Women's World Cup qualification
31	25 October 2014	Sparda Bank Hessen Stadium, Offenbach am Main, Germany	Germany	0–2	0–2	Friendly
32	21 June 2015	Olympic Stadium, Montreal, Canada	South Korea	2–0	3–0	2015 FIFA Women's World Cup
Correct as of 21 June 2015

== Honours ==
=== Club ===
Montpellier

- Coupe de France Féminine: 2006, 2007

Lyon

- Division 1 Féminine: 2007–08, 2008–09, 2009–10, 2010–11, 2011–12, 2012–13, 2013–14, 2014–15, 2015–16
- Coupe de France Féminine: 2007–08, 2011–12, 2013, 2014, 2015, 2016
- UEFA Women's Champions League: 2010–11, 2011–12, 2015–16, 2016–17, 2017–18

=== International ===
France

- UEFA Women's Under-19 Championship: 2003
- Cyprus Cup: 2012, 2014
- SheBelieves Cup: 2017

== See also ==
- List of women's footballers with 100 or more international caps
