= Ophélie Meilleroux =

French footballer (born 1984)

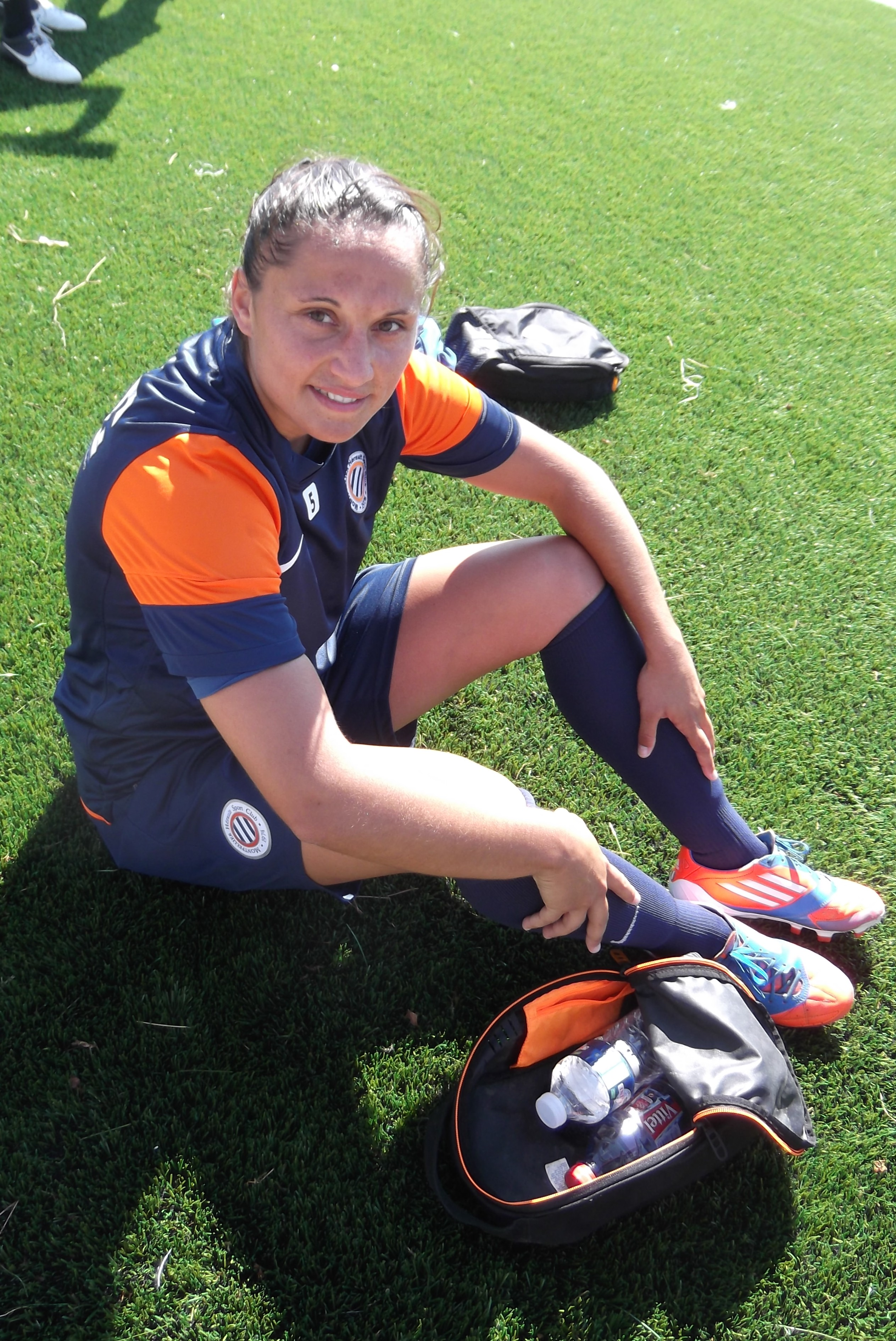
- Meilleroux in 2013

Personal information
- Full name: Ophélie Anne-Laure Meilleroux
- Date of birth: 18 January 1984 (age 42)
- Place of birth: Montluçon, France
- Height: 5 ft 5 in (1.65 m)
- Position: Defender

Youth career
- 1992–1999: Montluçon
- 1999–2002: Nord Allier Yzeure

Senior career*
Years	Team	Apps	(Gls)
2002–2003	CNFE Clairefontaine	16	(3)
2003–2008	Soyaux	102	(7)
2008–2010	Nord Allier Yzeure	29	(2)
2010–2014	Montpellier	30	(0)
2017-2019	FF Yzeure		
2021-2022	FF Yzeure	1	(0)

International career^{‡}
2002	France U-19		
2003–2013	France	65	(0)
- * Club domestic league appearances and goals as of 20:13, 15 February 2012 (UTC) ‡ National team caps and goals as of 02:06, 24 October 2012 (UTC)

Ophélie Anne-Laure Meilleroux (born 18 January 1984) is a French former football player. Meilleroux primarily plays as a central defender, but can also play in the defensive midfielder role. She is a member of the France women's national football team making her first major tournament appearance with her nation at UEFA Women's Euro 2009.

== Club career ==
=== Early career ===
Meilleroux began her career playing for the women's section of amateur football club ÉDS Montluçon in her hometown. She spent several years with the club's youth setup before being selected to attend CNFE Clairefontaine, the women's section of the prestigious Clairefontaine academy. Meilleroux played one season with the academy scoring three goals, despite playing as a defender. After leaving the academy, she joined D1 Féminine club ASJ Soyaux. At Soyaux, Meilleroux played on the team alongside future international teammate Corine Franco and earned her first call up to the national team because of her consistent play with the club. She appearing in 20 or more matches in four straight seasons for Soyaux. Meilleroux also collected a career-high nine yellow cards in her first season with the club. In her final season (2007–08) with Soyaux, Meilleroux played in 19 matches and scored only one goal.

=== Yzeure ===
For the 2008–09 season, Meilleroux moved to Nord Allier Yzeure. Her debut season with the club was both positive and negative as Nord Allier finished in a respectable 5th-place position, however Meilleroux appeared in only ten matches. She returned to form at the start of the 2009–10 season appearing in the team's first seven matches of the season helping Yzeure reach as high as 4th position in the table. Meilleroux ultimately finished the campaign with the club appearing in 19 matches.

=== Montpellier ===
On 9 July 2010, Meilleroux announced that she would be departing Nord Allier Yzeure to join Montpellier. She joined Montpellier as a replacement for the departed Sabrina Viguier who joined Lyon. Meilleroux was penciled in as a starter by coach Sarah M'Barek and made her club debut in the team's second league match of the season; a 2–0 win over Rodez. She consistently appeared with the team for most of the campaign before suffering an injury on 9 January 2011 in the team's 2–1 return leg victory over Rodez in the league. Meilleroux missed four matches and returned to the team on 12 February in its 5–0 win over Stade Briochin.

== International career ==
Meilleroux had previously starred with the women's under-19 team on two occasions. Her first time, she represented her nation at the 2002 UEFA Women's Under-19 Championship, held in Sweden. She was among the few underage players at the tournament for France. In the tournament, France finished as runners-up to champions Germany. The next season at the 2003 UEFA Women's Under-19 Championship, held in Germany, Meilleroux was installed as captain of the team and helped the team do one better winning the entire tournament. On 14 March 2003, she earned her first cap with the women's national team in a match against Denmark. Meilleroux was a regular participant in France's qualifying for UEFA Women's Euro 2009. With that in mind, coach Bruno Bini included her in the squad for the tournament, where France crashed out in the quarterfinals losing 4–5 on penalties to the Netherlands. Meilleroux in all four matches her nation contested.

== Career statistics ==
=== Club ===
Statistics accurate as of 15 February 2012

Club	Season	League		Cup		Continental		Total	
Club	Season	Apps	Goals	Apps	Goals	Apps	Goals	Apps	Goals
Soyaux	2003–04	20	4	0	0	0	0	20	4
Soyaux	2004–05	20	0	0	0	0	0	20	0
Soyaux	2005–06	21	2	0	0	0	0	21	2
Soyaux	2006–07	22	0	0	0	0	0	22	0
Soyaux	2007–08	19	1	3	1	0	0	22	2
Soyaux	Total	102	7	3	1	0	0	105	8
Yzeure	2008–09	10	1	1	0	0	0	11	1
Yzeure	2009–10	19	1	0	0	0	0	19	1
Yzeure	Total	29	2	1	0	0	0	30	2
Montpellier	2010–11	15	0	3	0	0	0	18	0
Montpellier	2011–12	15	0	1	0	0	0	16	0
Montpellier	Total	30	0	4	0	0	0	34	0
Career total		161	9	8	1	0	0	169	10

=== International ===
(Correct as of 24 October 2012)

National team	Season	Apps	Goals
France	2002–03	3	0
France	2003–04	1	0
France	2004–05	0	0
France	2005–06	0	0
France	2006–07	7	0
France	2007–08	8	0
France	2008–09	2	0
France	2009–10	15	0
France	2010–11	10	0
France	2011–12	17	0
France	2012–13	2	0
Total		65	0

== Honours ==
=== International ===
France

- UEFA Women's Under-19 Championship: 2003
- Cyprus Cup: 2012
