= Karima Benameur Taieb =

French footballer (born 1989)

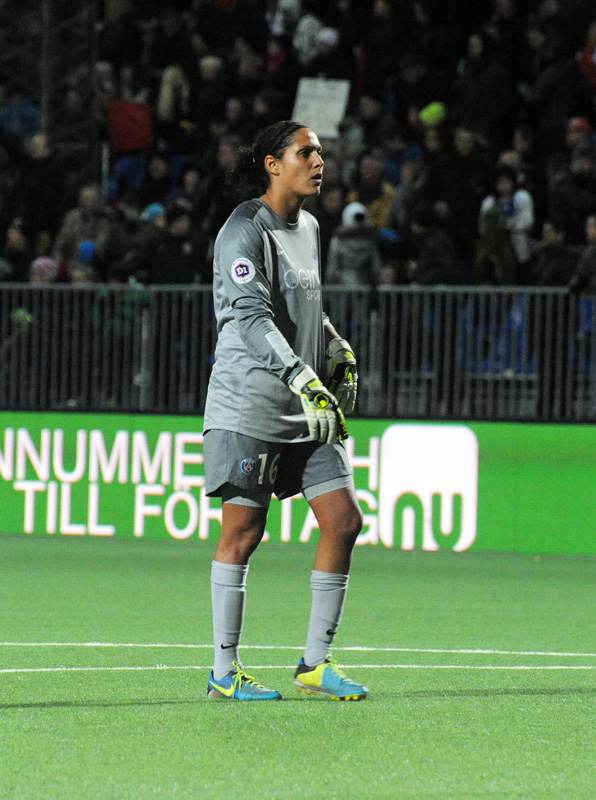
- Benameur Taieb with Paris Saint-Germain in 2013

Personal information
- Full name: Karima Benameur Taieb
- Date of birth: 13 April 1989 (age 37)
- Place of birth: Bédarieux, France
- Height: 1.76 m (5 ft 9 1/2 in)
- Position: Goalkeeper

Youth career
- 1996–2000: GC Le Bousquet-d'Orb
- 2000–2002: Entente Orb Gravezon
- 2002–2004: USB Pays d'Orb
- 2004–2005: Montpellier

Senior career*
Years	Team	Apps	(Gls)
2005–2007	CNFE Clairefontaine	18	(0)
2007–2009	Saint-Étienne	29	(0)
2009	Rodez	1	(0)
2009–2011	Toulouse	35	(0)
2011–2012	Rodez	14	(0)
2012–2015	Paris Saint-Germain	26	(0)
2015–2019	Paris FC (Note: Known as Juvisy till July 2017.)	43	(0)
2019–2022	Manchester City	12	(0)
2022–2023	Olympique Marseille	13	(0)

International career^{‡}
2005–2006	France U17	7	(0)
2006–2008	France U19	17	(0)
2008	France U20	5	(0)
2016–2019	France B	4	(0)
2007–2018	France	5	(0)
- * Club domestic league appearances and goals as of 9 January 2022 ‡ National team caps and goals as of 6 March 2019

Karima Benameur Taieb (born 13 April 1989) is a French professional footballer who plays as a goalkeeper and has also played for the France national team.

== Club career ==
Benameur Taieb played for Toulouse FC and Rodez AF before joining Paris Saint-Germain F.C. in 2012. Franck Raviot has been her most inspiring coach. In 2015, she moved to French club FCF Juvisy, (later renamed Paris FC) who compete in the Division 1 Féminine.

In 2019 Benameur Taieb made the first international move of her career, signing a one-year contract with English FA WSL side Manchester City.

== International career ==
Benameur Taieb was called up to the national team for the UEFA Women's Euro 2013.

== Personal life ==
Formerly known as Karima Benameur, Benameur Taieb announced in June 2020 that she would now adopt her mother's surname and sport Taieb on the back of her shirt.

== Career statistics ==
=== Club ===
As of match played 28 May 2023.

Appearances and goals by club, season and competition
Club	Season	League			Cup (Note: Includes the Women's FA Cup and Coupe de France Féminine)		League Cup (Note: Includes the FA WSL Cup)		Continental (Note: Includes the UEFA Women's Champions League)		Total	
Club	Season	Division	Apps	Goals	Apps	Goals	Apps	Goals	Apps	Goals	Apps	Goals
CNFE Clairefontaine	2005–06	Division 1	6	0	0	0	—		—		6	0
CNFE Clairefontaine	2006–07	Division 1	12	0	0	0	—		—		12	0
CNFE Clairefontaine	Total		18	0	0	0	—		—		18	0
AS Saint-Étienne	2007–08	Division 1	21	0	1	0	—		—		22	0
AS Saint-Étienne	2008–09	Division 1	8	0	0	0	—		—		8	0
AS Saint-Étienne	Total		29	0	1	0	—		—		30	0
Rodez AF	2009–10	Division 2	1	0	1	0	—		—		2	0
Toulouse FC	2009–10	Division 1	13	0	0	0	—		—		13	0
Toulouse FC	2010–11	Division 1	22	0	1	0	—		—		23	0
Toulouse FC	Total		35	0	1	0	—		—		36	0
Rodez AF	2011–12	Division 1	14	0	1	0	—		—		15	0
Paris Saint-Germain	2012–13	Division 1	8	0	4	0	—		—		12	0
Paris Saint-Germain	2013–14	Division 1	16	0	1	0	—		2	0	19	0
Paris Saint-Germain	2014–15	Division 1	2	0	0	0	—		0	0	2	0
Paris Saint-Germain	Total		26	0	5	0	—		2	0	33	0
FCF Juvisy (to 2017); Paris FC (from 2017)	2015–16	Division 1	11	0	0	0	—		—		11	0
FCF Juvisy (to 2017); Paris FC (from 2017)	2016–17	Division 1	3	0	1	0	—		—		4	0
FCF Juvisy (to 2017); Paris FC (from 2017)	2017–18	Division 1	14	0	1	0	—		—		15	0
FCF Juvisy (to 2017); Paris FC (from 2017)	2018–19	Division 1	15	0	4	0	—		—		19	0
FCF Juvisy (to 2017); Paris FC (from 2017)	Total		43	0	6	0	—		—		49	0
Manchester City	2019–20	FA WSL	1	0	1	0	1	0	0	0	3	0
Manchester City	2020–21	FA WSL	1	0	3	0	0	0	1	0	5	0
Manchester City	2021–22	FA WSL	10	0	0	0	3	0	2	0	15	0
Manchester City	Total		12	0	4	0	4	0	3	0	23	0
Olympique Marseille	2022–23	Division 2	13	0	3	0	—		—		16	0
Career total			191	0	22	0	4	0	5	0	222	0

=== International ===
As of match played 6 April 2018

Appearances and goals by national team and year
National team	Year	Apps	Goals
France	2007	1	0
France	2011	1	0
France	2017	1	0
France	2018	2	0
Total		5	0

== Honours ==
=== Club ===
Paris Saint-Germain F.C.

Runner-up

- Division 1 Féminine: 2012–2013, 2013–2014, 2014–2015

Manchester City

- FA Women's League Cup: 2021–22
