= Laure Lepailleur =

French footballer (born 1985)

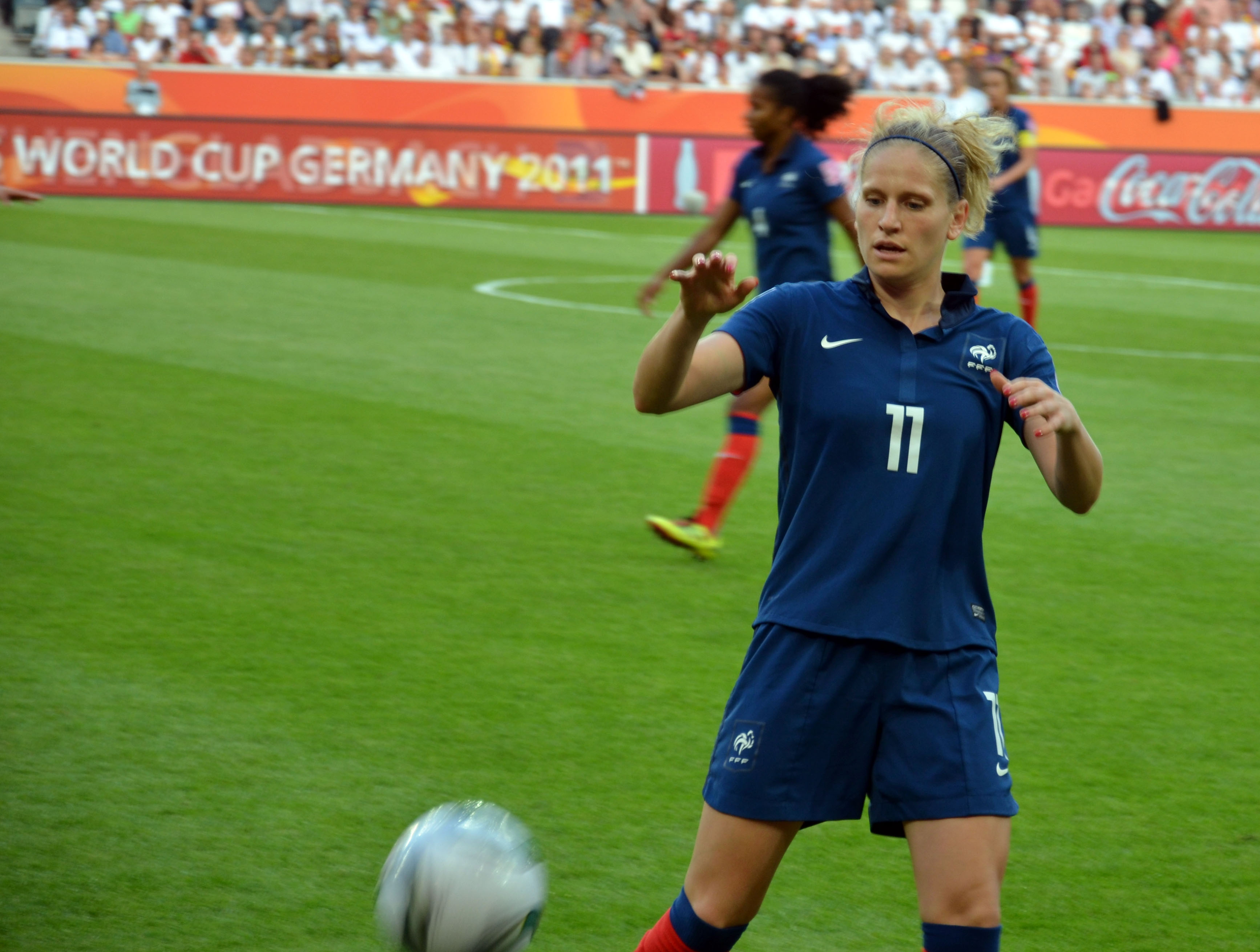
- Lepailleur at the 2011 World Cup

Personal information
- Full name: Laure Maud Yvette Lepailleur
- Date of birth: 7 March 1985 (age 41)
- Place of birth: Bernay, France
- Height: 5 ft 7 in (1.70 m)
- Positions: Defender; midfielder

Team information
- Current team: Paris Saint-Germain
- Number: 17

Youth career
- 1990–1999: SC Bernay
- 1999–2002: Évreux FC
- 2002–2003: CNFE Clairefontaine

Senior career*
Years	Team	Apps	(Gls)
2003–2004	CNFE Clairefontaine	8	(0)
2004–2006	Montpellier	60	(4)
2006–2008	Lyon	43	(1)
2008–2012	Paris Saint-Germain	89	(7)
2012–2015	FCF Juvisy	3	(1)

International career^{‡}
2005–2011	France	38	(2)
- * Club domestic league appearances and goals as of 26 April 2011 (UTC) ‡ National team caps and goals as of 20 November 2011 (UTC)

Laure Maud Yvette Lepailleur (born 7 March 1985) is a former French football player who played for Lyon, Paris Saint-Germain and other French clubs, and for the France national team. Lepailleur primarily played as a midfielder, but also as a defender.

== Career ==
Lepailleur began her career playing for her hometown club Sporting Club de Bernay. After a stint in the youth system, she joined the women's section of Évreux AC (now Évreux FC). She was later selected to attend CNFE Clairefontaine, the women's section of the prestigious Clairefontaine academy. She played one season (2003–04) with the academy making eight appearances scoring no goals. After leaving the academy, she joined D1 Féminine mainstay Montpellier. In her two seasons at the club, Lepailleur was a regular in the starting eleven. She helped the club win the 2004–05 D1 Féminine title and the 2005–06 Challenge de France. Following the Challenge de France success, Lepailleur moved to up-and-coming club Olympique Lyonnais and, despite not receiving consistent playing time, helped the club win back-to-back titles in 2007 and 2008. Her decreasing playing time, including a short stint playing for the Lyon reserve team in the third division, saw the international moved to impending rivals Paris Saint-Germain. In her first season with the Parisians, she only appeared in 11 matches scoring one goal. For the 2008–09 season, Lepailleur was joined by fellow internationals Camille Abily, Sonia Bompastor, and Élise Bussaglia. The additions helped Paris Saint-Germain reach as high as 1st position with Lepailleur appearing in six of the first seven league matches the team contested.

== International career ==
Lepailleur had previously starred with the women's under-19 team helping France win the 2003 UEFA Women's Under-19 Championship, held in Germany. On 13 March 2005, she earned her first cap with the women's national team in a match against Finland. On 10 August 2009, she was named to the squad to participate in UEFA Women's Euro 2009, due to an injury to national team regular Sandrine Dusang. Lepailleur had not appeared in any matches during the qualification process and only made one substitute appearance in the tournament as France crashed out in the quarterfinals losing 5–4 on penalties to the Netherlands.

== Sports consultant and manager ==
During the 2015 Women's World Cup in Canada, she became a consultant for Eurosport . In 2018, she joined RMC Sport.

In September 2020, Laure Lepailleur became manager of the HAC women's section. Her mission is to continue the development and structuring of women's football within the Le Havre club. In January 2021, she also took on the role of assistant to the new coach Michaël Bunel .
