= Laura Georges =

French footballer (born 1984)

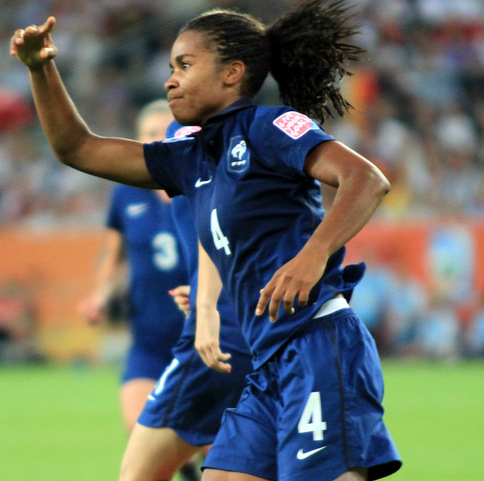
- Georges playing for France in 2011

Personal information
- Full name: Laura Stéphanie Georges
- Date of birth: 20 August 1984 (age 42)
- Place of birth: Le Chesnay, France
- Height: 1.72 m (5 ft 8 in)
- Position: Centre back

Youth career
- 1996–2002: Paris Saint-Germain
- 2002–2003: CNFE Clairefontaine

College career
Years	Team	Apps	(Gls)
2004–2007	Boston College Eagles		

Senior career*
Years	Team	Apps	(Gls)
2003–2004	Paris Saint-Germain	19	(1)
2007–2013	Olympique Lyon	104	(4)
2013–2017	Paris Saint-Germain	66	(8)
2018	Bayern Munich	1	(0)

International career^{‡}
2001	France U18	4	(0)
2002	France U19		
2001–2018	France	188	(7)
- * Club domestic league appearances and goals as of 18 February 2018 ‡ National team caps and goals as of 24 November 2017

Laura Stéphanie Georges (born 20 August 1984) is a French retired footballer who is the Secretary General of the French Football Federation. She last played for German club Bayern Munich of the Bundesliga, and served as the first-choice captain of her club and played primarily as a central defender, but was also used as a defensive midfielder. Georges was also a France women's international having made her senior international debut in September 2001. She represented her nation at seven major international tournaments; the 2003, 2011 and 2015 editions of the FIFA Women's World Cup and the 2005, 2009, 2013 and 2017 editions of the UEFA Women's Championship.

== Club career ==
=== Early career ===
Georges began her football career playing for her hometown club Paris Saint-Germain at the age of 12. She spent six years in the club's youth academy before being accepted to CNFE Clairefontaine, the women's section of the Clairefontaine academy. Georges returned to Paris Saint-Germain after a year at Clairefontaine and was promoted to the senior team for the 2003–04 season. She made 19 appearances with the team scoring one goal.

After the league season with Paris Saint-Germain, Georges announced her intentions to move to the United States to attend Boston College. She majored in marketing and, while at the university, played college soccer for the Boston College Eagles women's soccer team. In her first season, Georges featured in 13 matches making nine starts. In her second season with the team, despite missing matches due to representing France internationally, she was named to the All-ACC first team and also earned third-team All-America honors from the NSCAA. In her final season at the university, Georges was named to the conference's first team for the second consecutive season and was awarded the ACC Defensive Player of the Year award. She was also a semifinalist for the prestigious Hermann Trophy.

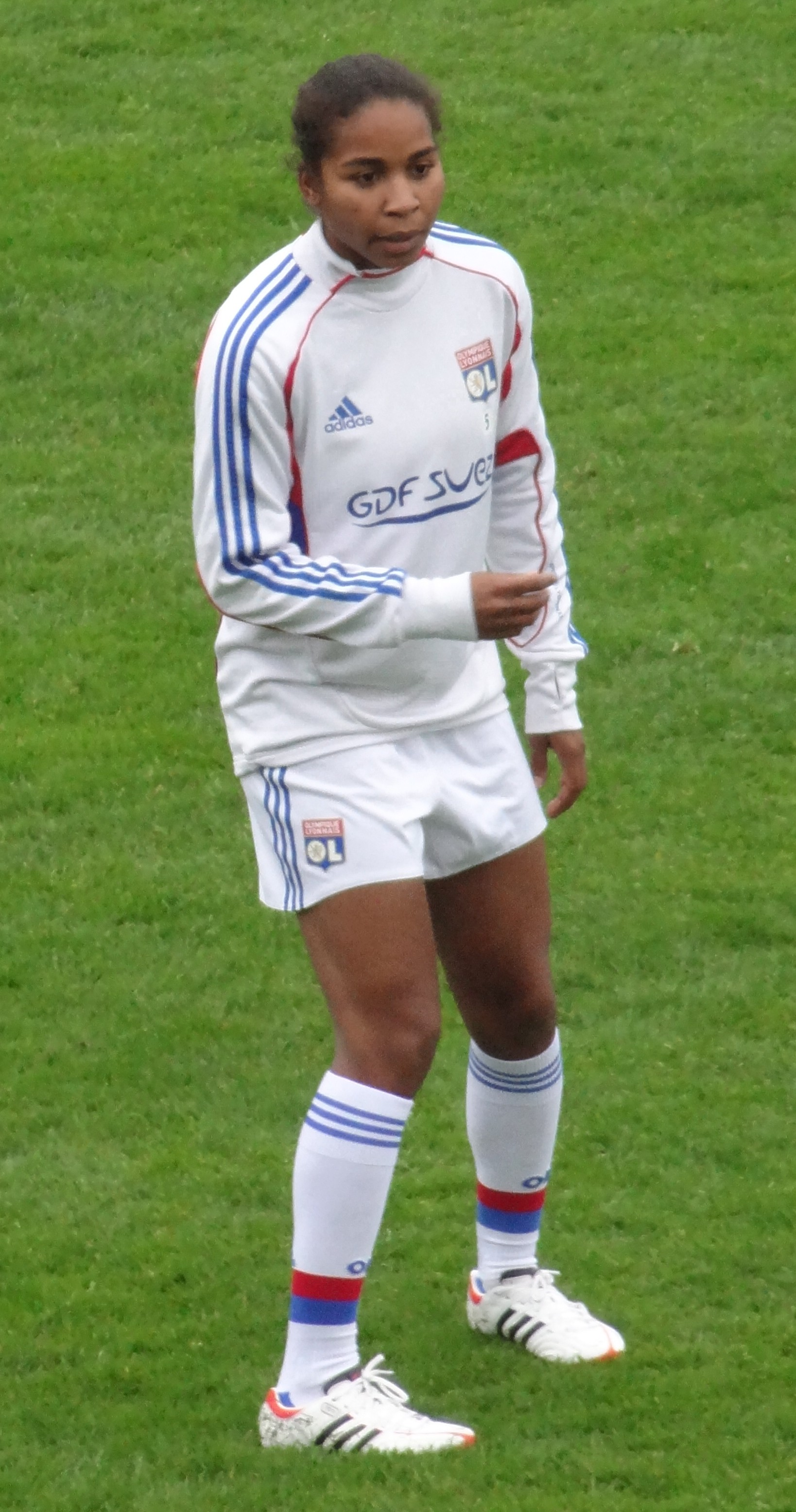
Laura Georges with Olympique Lyonnais

=== Lyon ===
Following the conclusion of her amateur career, Georges returned to France to join Olympique Lyonnais. In her first season with the club, she was penciled in as a starter featuring in 18 matches as Lyon finished the season as champions after going undefeated. Georges was also influential in the team's Challenge de France campaign featuring in all four matches, including the final, which Lyon won, defeating her former club Paris Saint-Germain 3–0. In the 2008–09 season, Lyon were again crowned champions. In the season, Georges scored her first career goal for Lyon in the opening league match of the season against Paris Saint-Germain. She also helped the club reach the semi-finals in both the domestic cup and UEFA Women's Cup.

Following the departure of veterans Camille Abily and Sonia Bompastor to the WPS, Georges was handed the captaincy by coach Farid Benstiti for the 2009–10. She played in 16 league matches as Lyon were declared champions for the fourth consecutive season. In Europe, Georges was a part of the Lyon team that reached the 2010 UEFA Women's Champions League Final. The team, however, lost 7–6 on penalties to German club Turbine Potsdam. In the next season, despite the return of Abily and Bompastor, Georges remained captain and displayed her leadership by leading Lyon to victory in the UEFA Women's Champions League Final.

=== Paris Saint-Germain ===
In July 2013, she signed with PSG.

=== Bayern Munich ===
On 8 January 2018 she moved to Bayern Munich. At the end of May 2018, the 33-year-old ended her long, successful career.

== International career ==
Georges made her international debut for France on 26 September 2001 in a match against the Netherlands at the age of 17. She was a part of France's 2003 World Cup squad and also participated in the 2005 UEFA Women's Championship. As of total, she won 188 caps and scored seven goals for the national team.

== Career statistics ==
=== Club ===
Updated 8 June 2015

Club	Season	League		Cup		Continental		Total	
Club	Season	Apps	Goals	Apps	Goals	Apps	Goals	Apps	Goals
Paris SG	2006–07	19	1	0	0	0	0	19	1
Paris SG	Total	19	1	0	0	0	0	19	1
Lyon	2007–08	18	0	4	0	10	0	32	0
Lyon	2008–09	20	1	3	1	6	1	29	3
Lyon	2009–10	16	1	1	0	6	0	23	1
Lyon	2010–11	18	0	3	0	6	0	27	0
Lyon	2011–12	14	0	3	0	5	1	22	1
Lyon	2012–13	18	2	4	0	5	0	27	2
Lyon	Total	104	4	18	1	38	2	160	7
Paris SG	2013–14	19	5	3	0	2	0	24	5
Paris SG	2014–15	16	2	2	0	7	0	25	2
Paris SG	Total	35	7	5	0	9	0	49	7
Career total		158	12	23	1	47	2	228	15

=== International ===
(Correct as of 22 December 2018)

National Team	Year	Stats	
National Team	Year	Games	Goals
France	2001	4	0
France	2002	1	0
France	2003	12	0
France	2004	9	0
France	2005	14	2
France	2006	14	0
France	2007	6	0
France	2008	7	0
France	2009	16	0
France	2010	9	0
France	2011	19	1
France	2012	18	2
France	2013	12	1
France	2014	15	0
France	2015	11	0
France	2016	6	0
France	2017	12	1
France	2018	3	0
Total		188	7

==== International goals ====
#	Date	Venue	Opponent	Score	Result	Competition
1	15 March 2005	Estádio Algarve, Faro, Portugal	Sweden	1–0	3–2	2005 Algarve Cup
2	7 September 2005	Stade Fernand Sastre, Sens, France	Republic of Ireland	1–0	6–0	Friendly
3	5 July 2011	Borussia-Park, Mönchengladbach, Germany	Germany	2–3	2–4	2011 FIFA Women's World Cup
4	28 July 2012	Hampden Park, Glasgow, Scotland	North Korea	1–0	5–0	2012 Summer Olympics
5	3 August 2012	Hampden Park, Glasgow, Scotland	Sweden	1–1	1–2	2012 Summer Olympics
6	27 November 2013	MMArena, Le Mans, France	Bulgaria	12–0	14–0	2015 World Cup Qualifying
7	18 September 2017	Stade de l'Epopée, Calais, France	Spain	1–0	3–1	Friendly
Correct as of 18 September 2017

== Honours ==
=== Club ===
Lyon

- Division 1 Féminine: Winner 2007–08, 2008–09, 2009–10, 2010–11, 2011–12, 2012–13
- Coupe de France Féminine: Winner 2007–08, 2011–12, 2012–13
- UEFA Women's Champions League: Winner 2010–11, 2011–12

=== International ===
France

- Cyprus Cup: Winner 2012, 2014
- SheBelieves Cup: Winner 2017

=== Individual ===
- ACC Defensive Player of the Year: 2006
- All-ACC First Team: 2005, 2006
- FIFA Women's World Cup All-Star Team: 2011
