= Coralie Ducher =

French footballer (born 1986)

Personal information
- Date of birth: 11 September 1986 (age 40)
- Place of birth: Roanne , France
- Height: 5 ft 7 in (1.70 m)
- Position: Defender

Senior career*
Years	Team	Apps	(Gls)
2004–2010	Lyon		
2010–2011	Fortuna Hjørring		

International career
2009	France	1	(0)
- * Club domestic league appearances and goals

Coralie Ducher (born 11 September 1986) is a French footballer who plays as a defender who played Lyon. Ducher also played one season with the Danish side Fortuna Hjørring before retiring due to injury.

== Honours ==
Lyon

- Division 1 Féminine: 2006–07, 2008–09, 2009–10
