= Stine Frantzen =

Norwegian footballer (born 1984)

Personal information
- Date of birth: 29 January 1984 (age 42)
- Place of birth: Harstad, Norway
- Height: 1.72 m (5 ft 8 in)
- Positions: Midfielder; forward

International career
Years	Team	Apps	(Gls)
2001	Norway U17	6	(2)
2002–2003	Norway U19	13	(4)
2005	Norway U21	2	(0)
2004–2005	Norway	8	(1)
Medal record
Women's football
Representing Norway
UEFA Women's Championship
Silver medal – second place	2005 England	Team

Stine Frantzen Schultz (born 29 January 1984) is a Norwegian footballer who played for IF Fløya. She won the Norwegian Football Cup with Medkila IL.

== International career ==
Frantzen represented Norway at youth level at the 2003 UEFA Women's Under-19 Championship, Norway finished runner up in the tournament.

She competed at the 2005 UEFA Women's European Championships with Norway which they finished as runners up. She represented Norway 8 times and scoring once, as well as getting several youth international caps.

== Honours ==
Medkila

- Norwegian Women's Cup: 2003
