= Nonna Debonne =

French football defender (born 1985)

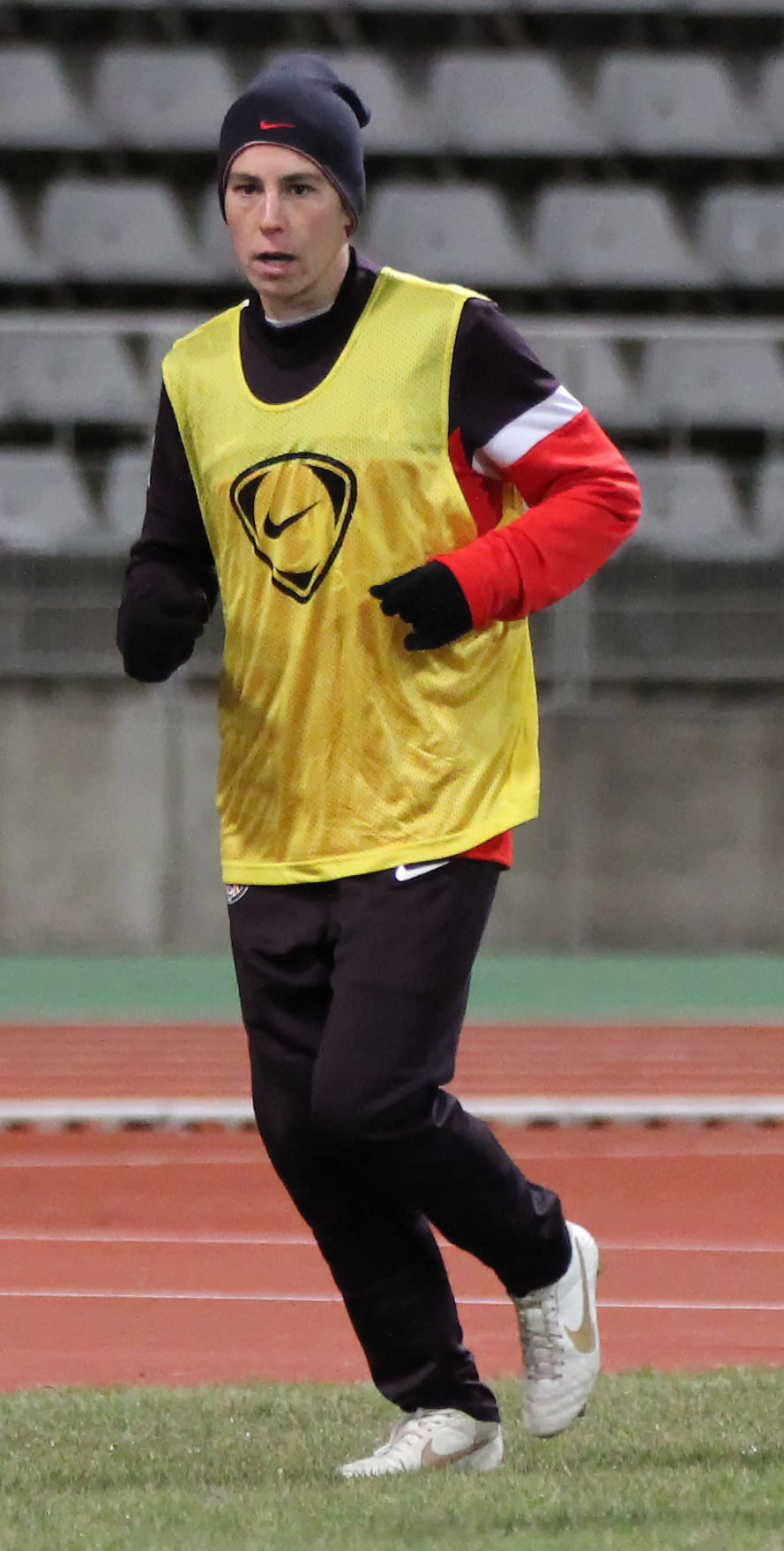
- Debonne with PSG in 2012

Personal information
- Date of birth: 5 March 1985 (age 41)
- Place of birth: Le Mans, France
- Height: 1.68 m (5 ft 6 in)
- Position: Defender

Team information
- Current team: GPSO 92 Issy
- Number: 8

Youth career
- Le Mans FC

Senior career*
Years	Team	Apps	(Gls)
2002–2004	Clairefontaine	20	(1)
2004–2014	Paris Saint-Germain	164	(6)
2014–2015	Issy	17	(1)
2015	Le Mans	10	(3)
2016–2017	Poissy		(0)
2017-	GPSO 92 Issy	84	(6)

International career^{‡}
2007–	France	2	(0)
- * Club domestic league appearances and goals as of 22:45, 29 July 2022 (UTC) ‡ National team caps and goals as of 16 September 2016 (UTC)

Nonna Debonne (born 5 March 1985) is a French football defender currently playing for GPSO 92 Issy in the Division 1 Féminine. She has spent much of her career playing for Paris Saint-Germain.

She has played two matches for the France national team.

== Club statistics ==
As of 1 September 2016

Club	Season	League		Cup		Continental		Total	
Club	Season	Apps	Goals	Apps	Goals	Apps	Goals	Apps	Goals
CNFE Clairefontaine
CNFE Clairefontaine	2003–04	20	1	–	–	–	–	20	1
CNFE Clairefontaine	Total	20	1	–	–	–	–	20	1
Paris SG
Paris SG	2004–05	22	1	–	–	–	–	22	1
Paris SG	2005–06	14	1	–	–	–	–	14	1
Paris SG	2006–07	22	2	–	–	–	–	22	2
Paris SG	2007–08	20	0	4	0	–	–	24	0
Paris SG	2008–09	22	1	1	0	–	–	23	1
Paris SG	2009–10	17	0	5	1	–	–	22	1
Paris SG	2010–11	15	0	–	–	–	–	15	0
Paris SG	2011–12	14	0	5	0	4	1	23	1
Paris SG	2012–13	15	0	2	0	–	–	17	0
Paris SG	2013–14	3	1	1	0	–	–	4	1
Paris SG	Total	164	6	18	1	4	1	186	8
Issy
Issy	2014–15	17	1	1	0	–	–	18	1
Issy	Total	17	1	1	0	–	–	18	1
Le Mans
Le Mans	2015–16	10	3	–	–	–	–	10	3
Le Mans	Total	10	3	–	–	–	–	10	3
Poissy
Poissy	2015–16			–	–	–	–		
Poissy	Total			–	–	–	–		
Career total		211	11	19	1	4	1	234	13
