= Anne-Laure Casseleux =

French footballer (born 1984)

Personal information
- Date of birth: 13 January 1984 (age 42)
- Place of birth: Tarare, France
- Height: 1.65 m (5 ft 5 in)
- Position: Defender

Youth career
- 1993–1997: Stade Amplepuisien
- 1997–1998: ES Lierguoise
- 1998–1999: Stade Amplepuisien
- 1999–2000: SC Caluire

Senior career*
Years	Team	Apps	(Gls)
1999–2001	SC Caluire		
2001–2002	Lyon		
2002–2003	CNFE Clairefontaine		
2003–2005	Soyaux	39	(3)
2005–2011	Juvisy	47	(1)

International career
1999–2001	France U-17	7	(0)
2001–2003	France U-19	26	(0)
2003–2008	France	28	(0)
- * Club domestic league appearances and goals

Anne-Laure Casseleux (born 13 January 1984) is a French former football player who last played for the French club Juvisy of the Division 1 Féminine. She is a former graduate of the women's section of the Clairefontaine academy and plays as a defender. After Clairefontaine, Casseleux joined Soyaux and had two seasons therebefore joining Juvisy in 2005. Her form at Soyaux also led to her being called up to the France women's team. Casseleux made her national team debut on 14 September 2003 in a friendly match against Japan.

As an under-19 international, she won the 2003 U-19 European Championship.
