= Montpellier FC =

French women's football club, based in Villeneuve-lès-Maguelone

- Full name: Montpellier Football Club
- Nickname: La Paillade
- Founded: 1990; 2001 as HSC
- Ground: Stade Jules Rimet, Sussargues
- Capacity: 500
- President: Laurent Nicollin
- Manager: Yannick Chandioux
- League: Première Ligue
- 2025–26: Première Ligue, 10th of 12
- Website: http://www.mhscfoot.com/articles/feminines
Home colours	Away colours

Montpellier Football Club, formerly known as Montpellier Hérault Sport Club Féminines (French pronunciation: [mɔ̃pɛˈlje eˈro]; commonly referred to as simply Montpellier) is a French women's football club based in Villeneuve-lès-Maguelone, a commune in the arrondissement of Montpellier. The club was founded in 1990. Montpellier play in the Première Ligue. The club is currently managed by Frédéric Mendy.

Montpellier hosts its home matches at the Stade Joseph-Blanc, a 1,000-capacity stadium that is situated in Villeneuve-lès-Maguelone. The club also hosts matches at the Stade de la Mosson in Montpellier, where the men's team plays.

== History ==
The club was formed in 1990 under the name Montpellier-Le-Crès following the fusion of local clubs Racing Club de Paillade and Entente Cressoise. In 2001, the women's club became the women's section of the football club Montpellier HSC. Since joining Montpellier, the women's section has won the Division 1 Féminine twice in 2004 and 2005 and the Challenge de France three in 2006, 2007, and 2009 making the club one of the most successful women's football clubs in French football. Montpellier reached the semi-finals of the 2005–06 edition of the UEFA Women's Cup and, during the 2009–10 season, reached the quarter-finals of the inaugural edition of the UEFA Women's Champions League losing to Swedish club Umeå on the away goals rule.

Montpellier has produced several well-known players that have played for the France women's national football team. Hoda Lattaf is a current member of the Montpellier first-team and was one of the leading players of the national team during her ten-year stint from 1997 to 2007. Lattaf finished her international career with 112 appearances and 31 goals. Current internationals and former players include Sonia Bompastor and Camille Abily who are both players abroad in the WPS in the United States. Internationals Louisa Necib, Élodie Thomis, and Laure Lepailleur all played for Montpellier before joining Olympique Lyonnais.

In October 2025, Crux Football, a newly established women-centric multi-club investment group, acquired 100% ownership of Montpellier HSC Féminines from Montpellier HSC. The transaction separated the women's section from the parent club's structure, making it an independent entity under the Crux umbrella. As part of the new governance, Paul Bouffard was appointed president of Montpellier Féminines to provide local leadership and experience. The acquisition is Crux Football's first investment and is intended to serve as a flagship model in building a portfolio of European women's football clubs. Club captain Sonia Ouchene expressed support, stating that the move represented an evolution for women's football in France and would help maintain high standards and achieve the club's ambitions.

== Players ==
=== Current squad ===
As of 10 July 2026

Note: Flags indicate national team as defined under FIFA eligibility rules; some limited exceptions apply. Players may hold more than one non-FIFA nationality.

No.	Pos.	Nation	Player
1	GK	FRA	Justine Lerond
3	DF	CAN	Marie Levasseur
4	DF	FRA	Marion Torrent
5	DF	HAI	Kethna Louis
6	MF	FRA	Ella Palis
8	MF	FRA	Sonia Ouchene
11	FW	FRA	Justine Rouquet
14	FW	FRA	Élisa Rambaud
15	MF	FRA	Cyrielle Blanc
16	GK	FRA	Marie Petiteau
17	MF	FRA	Judith Coquet

No.	Pos.	Nation	Player
20	DF	FRA	Agathe Felden
21	FW	CMR	Nina Ngueleu
22	FW	FRA	Lola Gstalter
27	MF	FRA	Rosalie Chaine
28	FW	FRA	Kentissia Bacoul-Juillard
99	MF	MAW	Rose Kadzere
—	MF	FRA	Laura Bourgouin
—	FW	POL	Natalia Oleszkiewicz
—	GK	FRA	Solène Durand
—	DF	NZL	Suya Haering

=== Former notable players ===
- (France) Camille Abily
- (France) Viviane Asseyi
- (France) Karima Benameur
- (France) Charlotte Bilbault
- (France) Delphine Blanc
- (France) Sonia Bompastor
- (France) Élise Bussaglia
- (France) Marie-Laure Delie
- (France) Céline Deville
- (France) Ludivine Diguelman
- (France) Kelly Gadéa
- (France) Sakina Karchaoui
- (France) Hoda Lattaf
- (France) Claire Lavogez
- (France) Laure Lepailleur
- (France) Sarah M'Barek
- (France) Élisa De Almeida
- (France) Marina Makanza
- (France) Ophélie Meilleroux
- (France) Louisa Necib
- (France) Mélissa Plaza
- (France) Élodie Ramos
- (France) Léa Rubio
- (France) Julie Soyer
- (France) Élodie Thomis
- (France) Laëtitia Tonazzi
- (France) Sandie Toletti
- (France) Sabrina Viguier
- (Australia) Mary Fowler
- (Brazil) Andressa Alves
- (Cameroon) Francine Zouga
- (Denmark) Luna Gevitz
- (Finland) Adelina Engman
- (Japan) Aya Sameshima
- (Japan) Rumi Utsugi
- (Scotland) Jen Beattie
- (Spain) Virginia Torrecilla
- (Sweden) Josefine Öqvist
- (Sweden) Linda Sembrant

== Current staff ==
As of 10 March 2024.

Position	Name
Head coach	(France) Yannick Chandioux
Assistant coach	(France) Baptiste Merle
Goalkeeper coach	(France) Brian Cottet
Strength and Conditioning Coach	(France) Allex Humbertclaude
Doctor	(Luxembourg) Claude Nilles
Kinesiologists	(France) Mélanie Métais
Kinesiologists	(France) Sébastien Gachon
Assistants	(France) Philippe Soulier
Assistants	(France) Bruno Guillen
Video Analyst	(France) Clément Libreau

== Record in UEFA competitions ==
As of 16 November 2017

- Further details: Montpellier HSC (Women) in European football

All results (away, home and aggregate) list Montpellier's goal tally first.

Competition	Round	Club	Away	Home	Aggregate
2004–2005	First qualifying round	(Republic of Ireland) UCD	–	5–0	–
2004–2005	First qualifying round	(Austria) Neulengbach	–	7–0	–
2004–2005	First qualifying round	(Portugal) Sintra	–	1–0	–
2004–2005	Second qualifying round	(Germany) Turbine Potsdam (Host)	0–6	–	–
2004–2005	Second qualifying round	(Italy) Torres Sassari	1–2	–	–
2004–2005	Second qualifying round	(Poland) Wrocław	0–2	–	–
2005–2006	First qualifying round	(Northern Ireland) Glentoran Belfast United	8–0	–	–
2005–2006	First qualifying round	(Wales) Cardiff City	2–0	–	–
2005–2006	First qualifying round	(Portugal) Sintra (Host)	1–0	–	–
2005–2006	Second qualifying round	(Netherlands) Saestum Zeist	–	2–1	–
2005–2006	Second qualifying round	(Austria) Neulengbach	–	4–0	–
2005–2006	Second qualifying round	(Germany) Turbine Potsdam	–	0–0	–
2005–2006	Quarter-final	(Denmark) Brøndby	3–1	3–0 ^{a}	6–1
2005–2006	Semi-final	(Germany) Frankfurt	1–0 ^{a}	2–3	3–3 (agr)
2009–2010	Qualifying round	(Faroe Islands) Klaksvík	2–0	–	–
2009–2010	Qualifying round	(North Macedonia) Tikvesanka Kavadarci (Host)	7–1	–	–
2009–2010	Qualifying round	(Bulgaria) NSA Sofia	3–0	–	–
2009–2010	Round of 32	(Belgium) Standard Liège	0–0 ^{a}	3–1	3–1
2009–2010	Round of 16	(Germany) Bayern Munich	1–0 a.e.t.	0–0 ^{a}	1–0
2009–2010	Quarter-final	(Sweden) Umeå	0–0 ^{a}	2–2	2–2 (agr)
2017–2018	Round of 32	(Russia) Zvezda Perm	2–0	0–1 ^{a}	2–1
2017–2018	Round of 16	(Italy) Brescia	3–2 ^{a}	6–0	9–2
2017–2018	Quarter-final	(England) Chelsea	1–3	0–2 ^{a}	1–5

^{a} First leg.

== Honours ==
=== Official ===
- Division 1 Féminine (Champions of France)
  - Winners (2): 2004, 2005
  - Runners-up (4): 2006, 2007, 2009, 2017
- Coupe de France
  - Winners (3): 2006, 2007, 2009
  - Runners-up (6): 2003, 2010, 2011, 2012, 2015, 2016

=== Invitational ===
- Pyrénées Cup
  - Winners (2): 2008, 2010
