= Alexandra Guiné =

French footballer (born 1985)

Personal information
- Full name: Alexandra Guiné
- Date of birth: 7 November 1985 (age 40)
- Place of birth: La Roche-sur-Yon, France
- Height: 1.66 m (5 ft 5 in)
- Position: Midfielder

Senior career*
Years	Team	Apps	(Gls)
1999–2002	Vendée La Roche		
2002–2004	Clairefontaine		
2004–2011	Juvisy	87	(8)
2013–2014	Juvisy	7	(0)

International career
2001–2002	France U17	7	(1)
2002–2004	France U19	20	(6)
2005–2007	France U21	4	(0)
2005	France	3	(0)
- * Club domestic league appearances and goals

Alexandra Guiné (born 7 November 1985) is a French former football midfielder that played in the French First Division for ESOF Vendée La Roche-sur-Yon, CNFE Clairefontaine and FCF Juvisy, also playing the UEFA Women's Cup with the latter. She earned three caps for the France national team in 2005, and as a junior international she won the 2003 U-19 European Championship.
