= Emmeline Mainguy =

Martiniquais footballer (born 1988)

Personal information
- Date of birth: 12 June 1988 (age 38)
- Place of birth: Caen, France
- Height: 1.77 m (5 ft 10 in)
- Position: Goalkeeper

Team information
- Current team: Metz
- Number: 1

Senior career*
Years	Team	Apps	(Gls)
2004–2006	FCF Condé	19	(0)
2006–2007	CNFE Clairefontaine	10	(0)
2007–2008	Lyon	15	(0)
2008–2011	Extremadura	29+	(0)
2011–2016	Guingamp	83	(0)
2016–2017	Santa Teresa	28	(0)
2017–2020	Dijon	49	(0)
2020	Napoli	4	(0)
2021–2022	Fleury	12	(0)
2022–2024	Metz	31	(0)
2024–	SM Caen		

International career^{‡}
2023–	Martinique	1	(0)
- * Club domestic league appearances and goals as of 26 May 2024 ‡ National team caps and goals as of 25 October 2023

Emmeline Mainguy (born 12 June 1988) is a footballer who plays as a goalkeeper for SM Caen. Born in mainland France, she plays for the Martinique national team.

== Club career ==
Mainguy debuted for French side FCF Condé at the age of sixteen. In 2007, Mainguy signed for French side Lyon, helping the club win the league. In 2011, she signed for French side Guingamp, In 2017, she signed for French side Dijon, where she alternated with France international Mylène Chavas. She was regarded as one of the club's most important players during late 2019.

On 12 July 2020, Mainguy was announced at Napoli.

In 2021, Mainguy was announced at Fleury.

Mainguy left Metz in June 2024.

On 26 July 2024, Mainguy was announced at SM Caen for the 2024/25 season.

== International career ==
Mainguy represented France internationally at the 2006 FIFA U-20 Women's World Championship.

Mainguy was called up to the Martinique national team in November 2023 for a 2024 CONCACAF W Gold Cup qualification match against El Salvador.

== Style of play ==
Mainguy is known for her reflexes.

== Personal life ==
Mainguy is a native of Caen, France.
