= Ludivine Diguelman =

French footballer (born 1984)

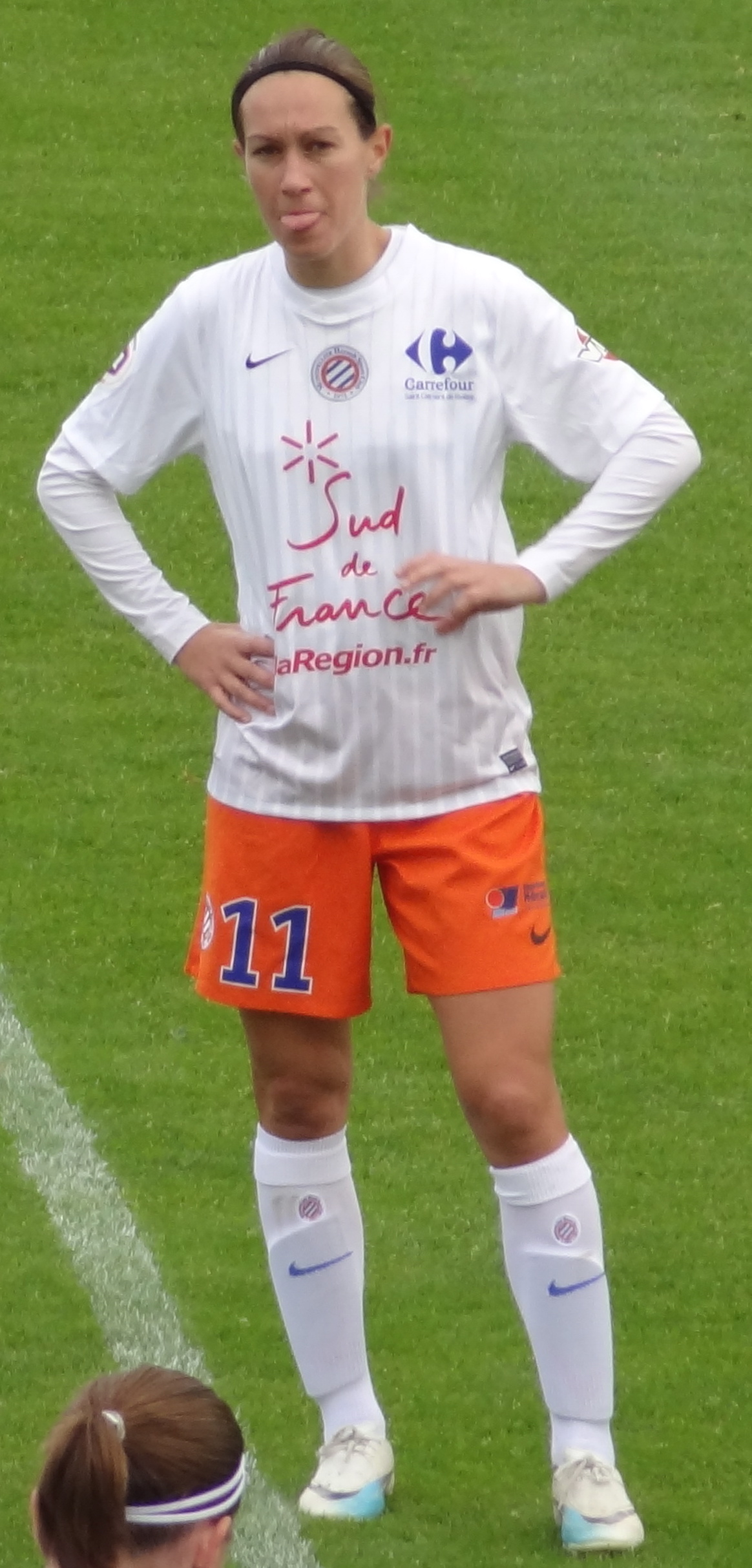

Personal information
- Full name: Ludivine Diguelman
- Date of birth: 15 April 1984 (age 42)
- Place of birth: Montpellier, France
- Height: 5 ft 7 in (1.70 m)
- Position: Midfielder

Team information
- Current team: Nîmes

Youth career
- 1990–1999: AS Gignac
- 1999–2000: Montpellier Le Crès
- 2000–2002: Montpellier
- 2002–2003: CNFE Clairefontaine

Senior career*
Years	Team	Apps	(Gls)
2001–2014	Montpellier	148	(39)
2014–	Nîmes	14	(2)

International career^{‡}
2002	France U-19		
2002–2009	France	39	(3)
- * Club domestic league appearances and goals as of 24 March 2010 ‡ National team caps and goals as of 30 November 2009

Ludivine Diguelman (born 15 April 1984) is a French football player currently playing for Nîmes of the Division 2 Féminine. Diguelman plays as a midfielder and spent most of her career at Montpellier of the Division 1 Féminine, being one of the longest-serving players at Montpellier having joined in 2000. She is also a member of the France women's national football team making her first major tournament appearance with her nation at UEFA Women's Euro 2009.

== Career ==
Diguelman was born in Montpellier and began her career with local club AS Gignac. She later joined Montpellier Le Crès. In 2001, Le Crès joined professional football club Montpellier HSC to form the club's women's section. Diguelman spent only a year in the youth system earning her debut during the 2001–02 season. Following the season, she was selected to attend CNFE Clairefontaine, the women's section of the prestigious Clairefontaine academy. She spent one year at the facility before returning to Montpellier. Upon her return in 2003, Diguelman was inserted into the starting eleven appearing in all 22 league matches scoring six goals. Her play, along with the team as a whole, saw Montpellier win the league title. The following season, Diguelman and Montpellier earned another title with the midfielder starting all 22 league matches. The 2005–06 season saw Montpellier earned no titles despite Diguelman scoring a career-high nine goals. Diguelman later helped the club win the 2006–07 Challenge de France and two seasons later contributed to the club's capture of another Challenge de France, as well as a 2nd-place finish in the league. The finish saw Montpellier earn qualification to the newly created UEFA Women's Champions League.

== International career ==
Prior to representing the senior team, Diguelman starred with the under-19 team that reached the final of the 2003 UEFA Women's Under-19 Championship, where they lost to Germany. She made her international debut on 1 June 2002 in a 2–1 victory over Ukraine during France's qualifying campaign for the 2003 FIFA Women's World Cup, which they later qualified for. Despite being a part of several of the team's matches ahead of the World Cup, which included the Algarve Cup tournament, Diguelman was not selected to play in the tournament. Diguelman was also not selected to play in UEFA Women's Euro 2005. She finally earned her first major tournament appearance for UEFA Women's Euro 2009 after being called up by manager Bruno Bini to serve as backup to Sonia Bompastor. Diguelman, however, appeared in no matches at the tournament with France reaching as far as the quarterfinals before losing to the Netherlands 4–5 on penalties.
