= Sandrine Dusang =

French footballer (born 1984)

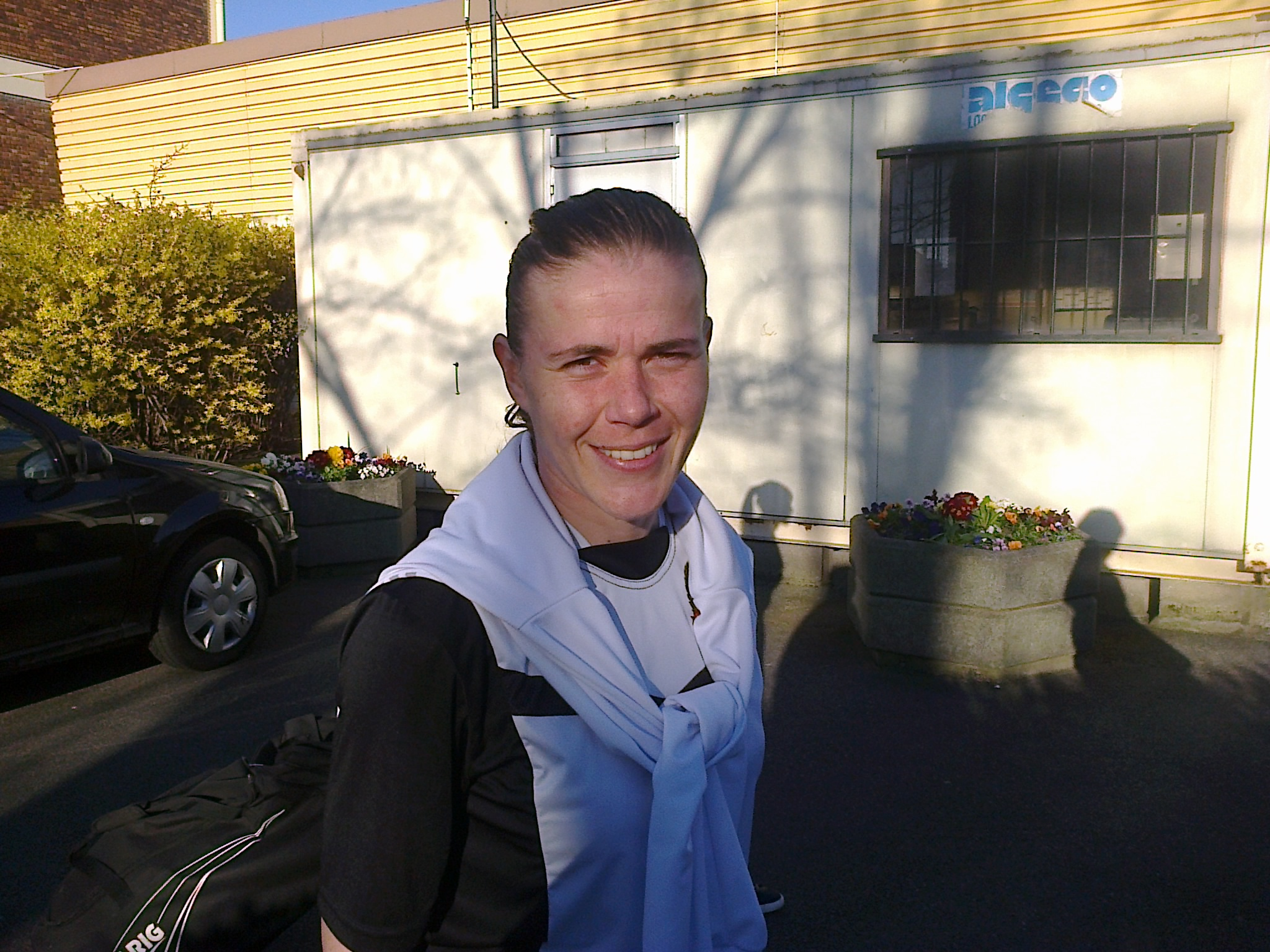
- Dusang in 2014

Personal information
- Full name: Sandrine Dusang
- Date of birth: 23 March 1984 (age 42)
- Place of birth: Vichy, France
- Height: 5 ft 7 in (1.70 m)
- Position: Defender

Team information
- Current team: Juvisy
- Number: 23

Youth career
- 1998–2002: Nord Allier Yzeure
- 2002–2003: CNFE Clairefontaine

Senior career*
Years	Team	Apps	(Gls)
2003–2011	Olympique Lyonnais	128	(21)
2012–2017	Juvisy	50	(4)

International career^{‡}
2001	France U-18	3	(0)
2002	France U-19	5	(0)
2003–	France	47	(1)
- * Club domestic league appearances and goals as of 21 September 2016 (UTC) ‡ National team caps and goals as of 21 September 2016 (UTC)

Sandrine Dusang (born 23 March 1984) is a French football player currently playing for Juvisy of the Division 1 Féminine. Dusang plays as a defender and is a member of the France women's national football team making her debut in 2003.

== Career ==
Dusang grew up in the city of Vichy and began her career playing for FCF Nord Allier Yzeure. She was later selected to attend CNFE Clairefontaine, the women's section of the prestigious Clairefontaine academy. Following her stint there, she joined Olympique Lyonnais. Since 2003, Dusang has made over 120 appearances scoring 20 goals. She has helped Lyon win an impressive three consecutive D1 Féminine titles beginning with the 2007–08 season.

== International career ==
Dusang made her international debut on 18 March 2003 in a 1–0 victory over Finland. She made her international major tournament debut after being selected to play in UEFA Women's Euro 2005. Dusang played in all three group stage matches as France failed to get through to the knockout rounds. Dusang scored her only international goal on 13 March 2005 against Finland in the 2005 edition of the Algarve Cup. France won the match 3–1.

== Honours ==
=== Club ===
Lyon

- Division 1 Féminine (6): 2006–07, 2007–08, 2008–09, 2009–10, 2010–11, 2011–12
- Challenge de France (2): 2007–08, 2011–12
- UEFA Women's Champions League (2): 2010–11, 2011–12
