= 2003 UEFA Women's Under-19 Championship =

Tournament details
- Host country: Germany
- Dates: 25 July – 3 August
- Teams: 8

Final positions
- Champions: France (1st title)
- Runners-up: Norway

Tournament statistics
- Top scorer(s): (Germany) Shelley Thompson (4 goals)
- Best player: (France) Sarah Bouhaddi

The UEFA Women's U-19 Championship 2003 Final Tournament was held in Germany between 25 July – 3 August 2003. Players born after 1 January 1984 were eligible to participate in this competition.

The tournament is notable for featuring a penalty kick shootout in the final group game in Group A between Italy and Sweden to determine the second semifinal qualifier. This is the first time that a penalty-kick shootout has been used in the group stage of a tournament since the rule was introduced.

== Qualifying ==
36 teams played for seven free places in the final. Two qualifying rounds were played.

== Final tournament ==
=== Group A ===
Pos	Team	Pld	W	D	L	GF	GA	GD	Pts	Qualification
1	England	3	2	0	1	5	8	−3	6	Semifinals
2	Sweden	3	1	1	1	6	6	0	4 (Note: Penalty shoot-out: Sweden 4, Italy 1.)	Semifinals
3	Italy	3	1	1	1	6	6	0	4	
4	Germany	3	1	0	2	7	4	+3	3	

Notes:
25 July 2003

Germany	0–2	Italy
	(Report)	Tona 20'; Ricco 39'

Sportzentrum, Taucha
Referee: Antonia Kokotou (Greece)
25 July 2003

Sweden	1–2	England
Odenyo 58'	(Report)	Scott 40'; Williams 89'

Am Stadtbad, Markranstädt
Referee: Snjezana Focic (Croatia)

27 July 2003

Germany	1–2	Sweden
Krahn 50'	(Report)	S. Andersson 33'; Seger 90+3'

Bruno-Plache-Stadion, Leipzig
Referee: Carla De Boeck (Belgium)
27 July 2003

Italy	1–3	England
Ricco 46'	(Report)	McDougall 20'; Aluko 26'; Williams 85'

Zentralsportpark, Markkleeberg
Referee: Gyöngyi Gaál (Hungary)

29 July 2003

England	0–6	Germany
	(Report)	Thompson 12', 40', 80', 90+1'; Goessling 23'; Laudehr 41'

Torgau
Referee: Ilonka Milanova Djaleva (Bulgaria)
29 July 2003

Italy	3–3	Sweden
Ricco 41'; Coppolino 63'; Domenichetti 90+2'	(Report)	Fischer 55'; Odenyo 62'; Siid-Ahmed 82'
Penalties
Manieri (penalty missed); Coppolino (penalty scored); Cortesi (penalty missed)	1–4	(penalty scored) Fischer; (penalty scored) Odenyo; (penalty scored) Almgren; (penalty scored) Siid-ahmed

Sportpark, Borna
Referee: Tatjana Pavlovic (Serbia)

=== Group B ===
Pos	Team	Pld	W	D	L	GF	GA	GD	Pts	Qualification
1	Norway	3	2	1	0	6	4	+2	7	Semifinals
2	France	3	1	1	1	6	6	0	4	Semifinals
3	Netherlands	3	1	0	2	4	5	−1	3 (Note: Head-to-head points: Netherlands 3, Spain 0.)	
4	Spain	3	1	0	2	5	6	−1	3	

Notes:
25 July 2003

Norway	2–2	France
Nilsen 47'; Heimlund 66'	(Report)	Josserand 34'; Bussaglia 75'

Stadion der Freundschaft, Grimma
Referee: Gyöngyi Gaál (Hungary)
25 July 2003

Netherlands	2–1	Spain
Kant 71'; Brouwer 90'	(Report)	S. García 18'

Dr. Fritz Fröhlich-Stadion, Regis-Breitingen
Referee: Ilonka Milanova Djaleva (Bulgaria)

27 July 2003

Norway	2–1	Netherlands
Frantzen 14'; Wiik 85'	(Report)	Vermeulen 9'

Eintracht Schkeuditz, Schkeuditz
Referee: Tatjana Pavlovic (Serbia)
27 July 2003

France	2–3	Spain
Guine 57'; Bussaglia 81'	(Report)	Martín 3', 26'; Casseleux 71' (o.g.)

Frischaufstadion, Wurzen
Referee: Snjezana Focic (Croatia)

29 July 2003

Spain	1–2	Norway
Pérez 16'	(Report)	Frantzen 57'; Knutsen 85'

Sportpark Tresenwald, Machern
Referee: Carla De Boeck (Belgium)
29 July 2003

France	2–1	Netherlands
Bussaglia 47'; Thiney 76'	(Report)	Melis 41'

Am Eichholz, Zwenkau
Referee: Antonia Kokotou (Greece)

=== Semifinals ===
1 August 2003

Norway	2–2	Sweden
Frantzen 72'; Heimlund 90+1'	(Report)	Fischer 5', 40'
Penalties
Woods (penalty scored); Vikestad (penalty scored); Nilsen (penalty scored); Frantzen (penalty missed); Henriksen (penalty scored)	4–2	(penalty scored) Fischer; (penalty scored) Odenyo; (penalty missed) Almgren; (penalty missed) Siid-Ahmed

Stadion der Freundschaft, Grimma
Referee: Ilonka Milanova Djaleva (Bulgaria)

1 August 2003

England	0–2	France
	(Report)	Josserand 12'; Debonne 88'

Am Stadtbad, Markranstädt
Referee: Carla De Boeck (Belgium)

=== Final ===
3 August 2003

France	2–0	Norway
Coquet 18'; Traikia 46'	(Report)

Alfred-Kunze-Sportpark, Leipzig
Attendance: 1,212
Referee: Snjezana Focic (Croatia)

== Awards ==
2004 UEFA Women's Under-19 champions

France
First title
