= CNFE Clairefontaine =

French training center

Pole France feminin de Football
- Established: 1998
- Location: France
- Coordinates: 48°49′53″N 2°27′13″E
- Website: Le Pôle sur le site de l'INSEP

The Pole France feminin de Football (English: French Women's Football Pole), formally the Centre national de formation et d'entraînement de Clairefontaine (English: National Education and Training Center Clairefontaine) is a French training center specializing in women's football, opened in 1998 and administered by the French Football Federation.

Formerly located on the Montjoye estate in Clairefontaine-en-Yvelines, since 2014 the Pole has been located at the National Institute of Sport, Expertise and Performance (INSEP) in Paris. From 2002 through 2007, CNFE Clairefontaine, as it was commonly known, played in the Division 1 Féminine.

== History ==
Created in 1998 at the initiative of Aimé Jacquet, the training center invites around 20 of the best prospects of French women's football every year. These youth players, aged 15 to 18 years old, are international players or referred from their home club to take advantage of federal structures to improve their training. Toward this end, the French Football Federation involved the CNFE in the first division between 2002 and 2007. Since 2008, players from the CNFE academy have been sent to their home clubs for the matches during the weekends.

At the start of the 2014 academic year, the Pole moved to INSEP. This had the notable advantage of allowing the women to train eight times a week, instead of five when they were at Clairefontaine. In addition, whereas they previously had to attend classes in a public high school in Rambouillet, 8 kilometers from the Clairefontaine grounds, INSEP has all services on site including studies, training, meals.

In December 2020, an investigation by L'Équipe published its report of an investigation which revealed that in 2013 a center coach was dismissed from the academy for having had sexual relations with several players.

== Seasons ==
Season	League									
Season	Division (tier)	Pld	W	D	L	GF	GA	Pts	Pos	Ref
2002-03	Division 1 Féminine	22	11	4	7	43	23	59	5th	
2003-04	Division 1 Féminine	22	12	5	5	35	10	63	5th	
2004-05	Division 1 Féminine	22	10	4	8	40	27	56	6th	
2005-06	Division 1 Féminine	22	10	4	8	42	31	56	5th	
2006-07	Division 1 Féminine	22	9	3	10	43	43	52	5th	

== Notable alumni ==
- Alexandra Guiné
- Amandine Henry
- Anne-Laure Casseleux
- Bérangère Sapowicz
- Camille Abily
- Caroline Pizzala
- Charlotte Bilbault
- Élise Bussaglia
- Élodie Thomis
- Eugénie Le Sommer
- Hoda Lattaf
- Julie Soyer
- Karima Benameur
- Laura Georges
- Laure Boulleau
- Laure Lepailleur
- Louisa Necib
- Ludivine Diguelman
- Marie-Laure Delie
- Kheira Hamraoui
- Marie-Ange Kramo
- Nonna Debonne
- Nora Coton-Pélagie
- Ophélie Meilleroux
- Peggy Provost
- Sabrina Delannoy
- Sandrine Dusang
- Sarah Bouhaddi

== Leadership ==
- Gérard Prêcheur (2000–2004, 2010–2014)
- Didier Christophe (2014–2016)
- Didier Brasse (2016–2020)
- Philippe Bretaud (since 2020)

=== External links ===
- Le Pôle sur le site de l'INSEP

== See also ==
- INF Clairefontaine
