= Océane Cairaty =

French football player and actress (born 1989)

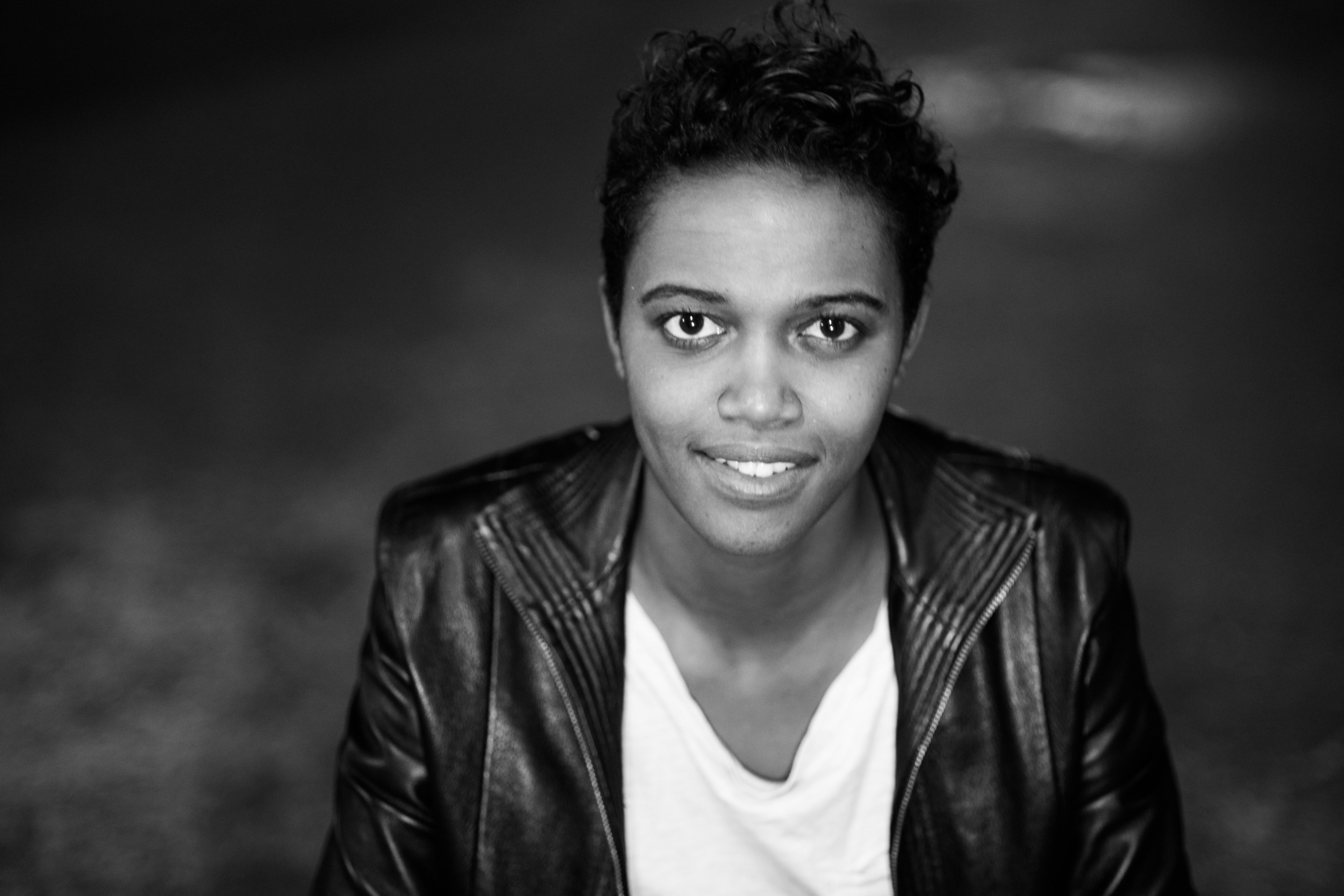

Personal information
- Date of birth: 23 March 1989 (age 37)
- Place of birth: Saint-Denis, Réunion
- Height: 1.75 m (5 ft 9 in)
- Position: Defender

Team information
- Current team: Lyon

International career
Years	Team	Apps	(Gls)
- France (women U-19)

Océane Caïraty (born 23 March 1989) is a French footballer and actor.
