= Élise Bussaglia =

French footballer (born 1985)

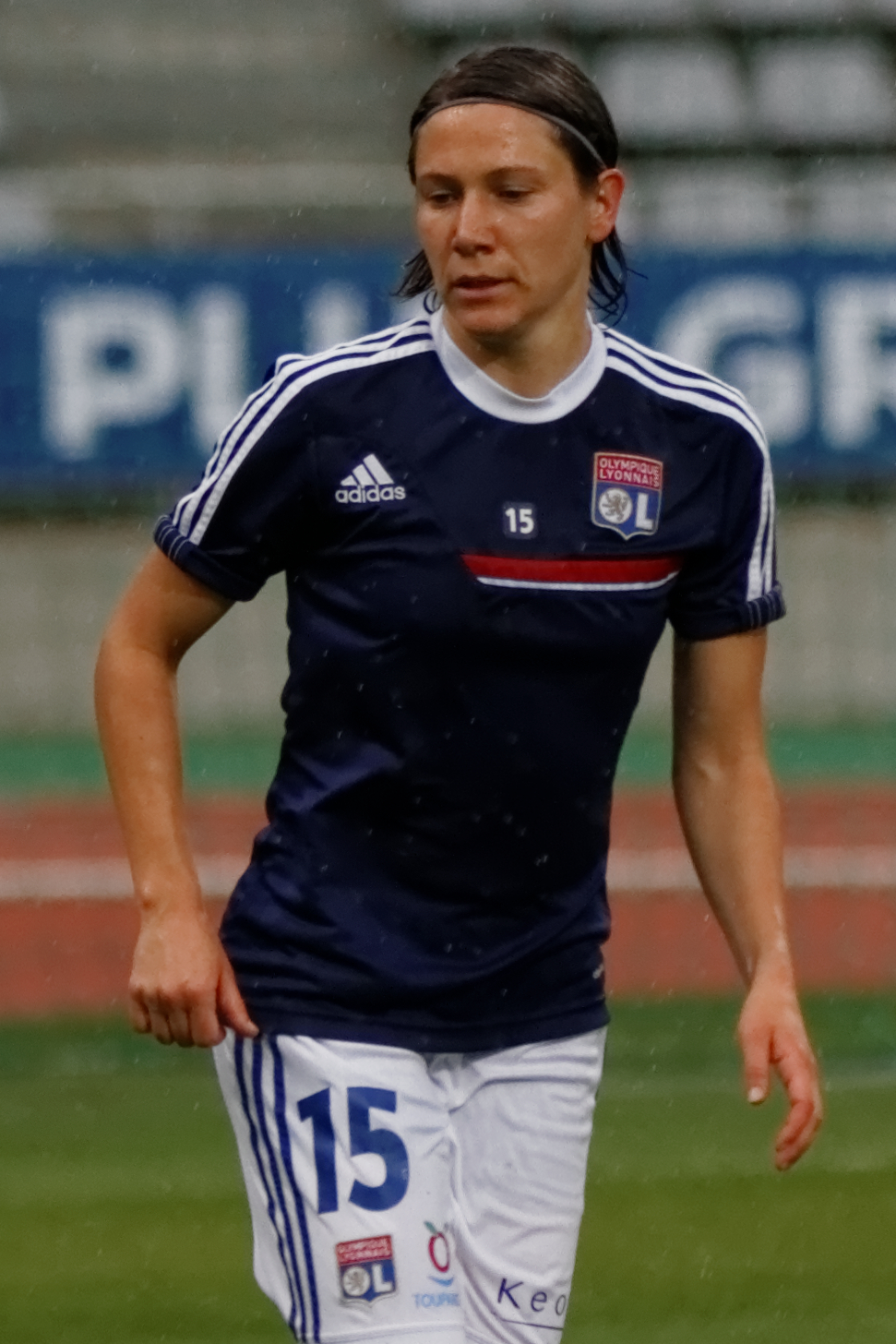
- Bussaglia with Lyon in 2013

Personal information
- Date of birth: 24 September 1985 (age 41)
- Place of birth: Sedan, France
- Height: 1.64 m (5 ft 5 in)
- Position: Midfielder

Team information
- Current team: Sedan (manager)

Youth career
- 1992–1997: US Balan
- 1997–2000: US Bazeilles

Senior career*
| Years | Team | Apps | (Gls) |
| 2000–2002 | Olympique Saint-Memmie | | |
| 2002–2004 | CNFE Clairefontaine | 20 | (1) |
| 2004–2007 | Juvisy | 58 | (13) |
| 2007–2009 | Montpellier HSC | 41 | (4) |
| 2009–2012 | Paris Saint-Germain | 58 | (13) |
| 2012–2015 | Lyon | 47 | (9) |
| 2015–2017 | VfL Wolfsburg | 32 | (6) |
| 2017–2019 | FC Barcelona | 23 | (3) |
| 2018–2020 | Dijon FCO | 24 | (6) |
| Total | | 303 | (55) |

International career
| 2003–2019 | France | 192 | (30) |

Managerial career
- 2024–: Sedan
- * Club domestic league appearances and goals

Élise Bussaglia (born 24 September 1985) is a French former footballer who played as a midfielder. She was a member of the France national team. Bussaglia is a former winner of the National Union of Professional Footballers (UNFP) Female Player of the Year having won the award after a successful 2010–11 season with Paris Saint-Germain. She currently manages Régional 1 Grand-Est side Sedan.

== Club career ==
Born in Sedan, Bussaglia was in middle school at Nassau in class with Benjamin Lemaire. She started to play soccer at US Balan with male team. During this period, she was supporting CS Sedan Ardennes.

=== Early career ===
Bussaglia began her career playing for Olympique Saint-Memmie playing at the club during her youth. She spent two years with the senior team before being selected to attend the CNFE Clairefontaine, the women's section of the Clairefontaine academy. After leaving the academy, she joined D1 Féminine club FCF Juvisy playing 14 matches and scoring two goals in her first season. In her second season with the club, she played in all 22 league matches scoring four goals helping Juvisy win the league title. She had another successful season before joining Montpellier. At Montpellier, Bussaglia became an established international player and helped Montpellier to two top table finishes, including helping the team win the 2008–09 Challenge de France and qualify for the newly created UEFA Women's Champions League in her final season.

=== Paris Saint-Germain ===
In 2009, Bussaglia signed with Paris Saint-Germain and, in the process, joined a club which included international teammates Camille Abily, Sonia Bompastor, Bérangère Sapowicz, and Laure Boulleau. In her first season with Les Parisiens, despite the club having a respectable season, Bussaglia struggled appearing in 18 matches and scoring only two goals in the league. The midfielder compensated her uneventful performance in the league with a decent showing in the Challenge de France netting the fourth goal in Paris Saint-Germain's 5–0 win over her former club Montpellier in the competition's final match. The victory assured Bussaglia her third career Challenge de France title.

In the 2010–11 season, following the departures of Abily and Bompastor, Bussaglia was handed the reins to the attack and quickly blossomed scoring four goals in Paris Saint-Germain's first five league matches of the season. On 26 February 2011, she scored both club goals in a 2–1 win over Le Mans. Bussaglia ultimately finished the season appearing in all 22 matches and scoring a career-high ten goals. Despite failing to score a goal in the final six matches of the season, Bussaglia was still an important cog of the team as Paris Saint-Germain qualified for the 2011–12 edition of the UEFA Women's Champions League after finishing runner-up to champions Lyon. For her performances during the season, Bussaglia was named the UNFP Female Player of the Year. She was also named the Best Player of the 2010–11 Division 1 Féminine season by her peers.

== International career ==
Bussaglia had previously starred with the women's under-19 team helping France win the 2003 UEFA Women's Under-19 Championship, held in Germany. On 13 November 2003, she earned her first cap with the women's national team in a match against Poland. As of today, she has 79 caps and has scored 18 goals for the national team. She retired in 2019.

== Career statistics ==
=== Club ===
As of 10 June 2015

Appearances and goals by club, season and competition
| Club | Season | League | | Cup | | Continental | | Total | |
| Club | Season | Apps | Goals | Apps | Goals | Apps | Goals | Apps | Goals |
|---|---|---|---|---|---|---|---|---|---|
| CNFE Clairefontaine | 2003–04 | 20 | 1 | 0 | 0 | 0 | 0 | 20 | 1 |
| Juvisy | 2004–05 | 14 | 2 | 0 | 0 | 0 | 0 | 14 | 2 |
| Juvisy | 2005–06 | 22 | 4 | 0 | 0 | 0 | 0 | 22 | 4 |
| Juvisy | 2006–07 | 22 | 7 | 0 | 0 | 3 | 0 | 25 | 7 |
| Juvisy | Total | 58 | 13 | 0 | 0 | 3 | 0 | 61 | 13 |
| Montpellier | 2007–08 | 19 | 4 | 3 | 0 | 0 | 0 | 22 | 4 |
| Montpellier | 2008–09 | 22 | 0 | 4 | 0 | 0 | 0 | 26 | 0 |
| Montpellier | Total | 41 | 4 | 7 | 0 | 0 | 0 | 48 | 4 |
| Paris Saint-Germain | 2009–10 | 18 | 2 | 4 | 1 | 0 | 0 | 22 | 3 |
| Paris Saint-Germain | 2010–11 | 22 | 10 | 1 | 0 | 0 | 0 | 23 | 10 |
| Paris Saint-Germain | 2011–12 | 18 | 1 | 5 | 1 | 2 | 0 | 25 | 2 |
| Paris Saint-Germain | Total | 58 | 13 | 10 | 2 | 2 | 0 | 70 | 15 |
| Lyon | 2012–13 | 9 | 3 | 4 | 0 | 3 | 0 | 16 | 3 |
| Lyon | 2013–14 | 21 | 4 | 3 | 0 | 4 | 1 | 28 | 5 |
| Lyon | 2014–15 | 17 | 2 | 4 | 1 | 4 | 0 | 25 | 3 |
| Lyon | Total | 47 | 9 | 11 | 1 | 11 | 1 | 69 | 11 |
| Career total | | 224 | 40 | 28 | 3 | 16 | 1 | 268 | 44 |

=== International ===
As of 9 August 2012

Appearances and goals by national team and year
| National team | Year | Apps | Goals |
|---|---|---|---|
| France | 2003–04 | 9 | 0 |
| France | 2004–05 | 11 | 1 |
| France | 2005–06 | 11 | 4 |
| France | 2006–07 | 13 | 4 |
| France | 2007–08 | 7 | 2 |
| France | 2008–09 | 6 | 1 |
| France | 2009–10 | 12 | 2 |
| France | 2010–11 | 18 | 5 |
| France | 2011–12 | 21 | 1 |
| Total | | 108 | 20 |

As of 8 April 2016
Scores and results list France's goal tally first, score column indicates score after each Bussaglia goal.

List of international goals scored by Élise Bussaglia
| No. | Date | Venue | Opponent | Score | Result | Competition |
|---|---|---|---|---|---|---|
| 1 | 8 September 2004 | Slagelse Stadion, Slagelse, Denmark | Denmark | 1–0 | 3–2 | Friendly |
| 2 | 7 September 2005 | Stade Fernand Sastre, Sens, France | Republic of Ireland | 4–0 | 6–0 | Friendly |
| 3 | 7 September 2005 | Stade Fernand Sastre, Sens, France | Republic of Ireland | 6–0 | 6–0 | Friendly |
| 4 | 18 January 2006 | Guangdong Olympic Stadium, Guangzhou, China | China | 1–0 | 1–1 | 2006 Four Nations Tournament |
| 5 | 11 March 2006 | Estádio Municipal, Lagos, Portugal | China | 1–0 | 1–0 | 2006 Algarve Cup |
| 6 | 23 September 2006 | Stade de l'Aube, Troyes, France | Austria | 1–0 | 2–1 | 2007 FIFA Women's World Cup qualification |
| 7 | 23 September 2006 | Stade de l'Aube, Troyes, France | Austria | 2–1 | 2–1 | 2007 FIFA Women's World Cup qualification |
| 8 | 9 March 2007 | Estádio Algarve, Faro, Portugal | Germany | 1–0 | 1–0 | 2007 Algarve Cup |
| 9 | 30 May 2007 | Stade Camille Lebon, Angoulême, France | Slovenia | 2–0 | 6–0 | UEFA Women's Euro 2009 qualifying |
| 10 | 27 October 2007 | Stadion Kralj Petar I, Belgrade, Serbia | Serbia | 8–0 | 8–0 | UEFA Women's Euro 2009 qualifying |
| 11 | 31 October 2007 | Dravograd Sports Centre, Dravograd, Slovenia | Slovenia | 1–0 | 2–0 | UEFA Women's Euro 2009 qualifying |
| 12 | 12 February 2009 | Stade Municipal des Allées, Blois, France | Republic of Ireland | 2–0 | 2–0 | Friendly |
| 13 | 12 August 2009 | Stade des Grands Prés, Chartres, France | Scotland | 1–0 | 4–0 | Friendly |
| 14 | 23 June 2010 | Kadrioru Stadium, Tallinn, Estonia | Estonia | 3–0 | 3–0 | 2011 FIFA Women's World Cup qualification |
| 15 | 25 August 2010 | Stade de l'Aube, Troyes, France | Serbia | 3–0 | 7–0 | 2011 FIFA Women's World Cup qualification |
| 16 | 15 September 2010 | Stadio Pietro Barbetti, Gubbio, Italy | Italy | 1–1 | 3–2 | 2011 FIFA Women's World Cup qualification |
| 17 | 7 March 2011 | GSP Stadium, Nicosia, Cyprus | New Zealand | 5–2 | 5–2 | 2011 Cyprus Cup |
| 18 | 15 May 2011 | Stade Francis-Le Blé, Brest, France | Scotland | 1–1 | 1–1 | Friendly |
| 19 | 9 July 2011 | BayArena, Leverkusen, Germany | England | 1–1 | 1–1 | 2011 FIFA Women's World Cup |
| 20 | 24 August 2011 | Stade Félix-Bollaert, Lens, France | Poland | 2–0 | 2–0 | Friendly |
| 21 | 23 November 2013 | Lovech Stadium, Lovech, Bulgaria | Bulgaria | 7–0 | 10–0 | 2015 FIFA Women's World Cup qualification |
| 22 | 28 November 2013 | MMArena, Le Mans, France | Bulgaria | 1–0 | 14–0 | 2015 FIFA Women's World Cup qualification |
| 23 | 10 March 2013 | GSP Stadium, Nicosia, Cyprus | Netherlands | 1–0 | 3–0 | 2014 Cyprus Cup |
| 24 | 10 March 2013 | GSP Stadium, Nicosia, Cyprus | Netherlands | 2–0 | 3–0 | 2014 Cyprus Cup |
| 25 | 9 April 2014 | MMArena, Le Mans, France | Austria | 1–0 | 3–1 | 2015 FIFA Women's World Cup qualification |
| 26 | 17 August 2014 | Stade de l'Épopée, Calais, France | Finland | 1–1 | 3–1 | 2015 FIFA Women's World Cup qualification |
| 27 | 27 October 2015 | Arena Lviv, Lviv, Ukraine | Ukraine | 2–0 | 3–0 | UEFA Women's Euro 2017 qualifying |
| 28 | 8 April 2016 | Stadionul Nicolae Dobrin, Pitești, Romania | Romania | 1–0 | 1–0 | UEFA Women's Euro 2017 qualifying |

== Honours ==
Juvisy

- Division 1 Féminine: 2005–06
- Coupe de France Féminine: 2004–05

Montpellier

- Coupe de France Féminine: 2008–09

Paris Saint-Germain

- Coupe de France Féminine: 2009–10

Lyon

- Division 1 Féminine: 2012–13, 2013–14, 2014–15
- Coupe de France Féminine: 2013, 2014, 2015

VfL Wolfsburg

- Bundesliga: 2016-17
- DFB-Pokal: 2015–16, 2016–17

Barcelona

- Copa de la Reina de Fútbol: 2018
- Copa Catalunya: 2017

France

- UEFA Women's Under-19 Championship: 2003
- Cyprus Cup: 2012, 2014
- SheBelieves Cup: 2017

Individual

- UNFP Female Player of the Year: 2010–11
- Division 1 Féminine League Player of the Year: 2010–11

== See also ==
- List of women's footballers with 100 or more caps
