= 2008–09 Division 1 Féminine =

35th edition of top French women's football league

Division 1 Féminine
- Season: 2008–-09
- Champions: Lyon (7th title)
- UEFA Women's Champions League: Lyon (Main round)

The 2008-09 D1 Féminine was the 35th edition of the league since its re-establishment by the French Football Federation. The league began on 23 August 2008 and is slated to end on 7 June 2009.

== League table ==
Note: A win in D1 Féminine is worth 4 points, with 2 points for a draw and 1 for a defeat.

Pos	Team	Pld	W	D	L	GF	GA	GD	Pts	Qualification or relegation
1	Lyon (C, Q)	22	21	1	0	114	11	+103	86	Qualification for Women's Champions League
2	Montpellier (Q)	22	17	1	4	63	23	+40	73	Qualification for Women's Champions League
3	Juvisy	22	15	5	2	53	22	+31	72	
4	Nord Allier	22	8	5	9	40	38	+2	51	
5	Hénin-Beaumont	22	9	2	11	49	60	−11	51	
6	Saint-Brieuc	22	8	4	10	32	53	−21	50	
7	Saint-Étienne	22	7	6	9	40	46	−6	49	
8	Paris Saint-Germain	22	7	6	9	29	30	−1	49	
9	Toulouse	22	7	5	10	34	46	−12	48	
10	Soyaux	22	5	4	13	22	51	−29	41	
11	Condé-sur-Noireau (R)	22	5	2	15	30	76	−46	39	Relegation to Division 2 Féminine
12	Vendenheim (R)	22	0	5	17	15	65	−50	27	Relegation to Division 2 Féminine

Rules for classification: 1st points; 2nd head-to-head goal difference; 3rd total goal difference
(C) Champions; (Q) Qualified for the phase indicated; (R) Relegated

== Results ==
Home \ Away	CSN	HEB	JUV	LYO	MON	YZE	PSG	SET	SOY	STB	TOU	VEN
Condé-sur-Noireau		3–2	1–2	0–9	1–9	0–3	5–1	2–2	0–1	0–1	4–0	3–0
Hénin-Beaumont	4–2		0–3	0–5	1–3	3–1	2–0	5–4	3–2	1–2	2–2	1–1
Juvisy	6–0	5–1		1–4	3–0	1–1	2–1	1–1	2–0	1–3	2–2	2–1
Lyon	4–1	8–0	0–0		2–1	6–0	2–0	6–3	7–0	14–1	2–0	12–0
Montpellier	6–1	2–1	1–4	1–2		3–0	3–1	1–0	3–0	3–1	4–0	3–1
Yzeure	5–0	4–3	1–4	1–4	0–1		2–2	5–0	0–0	2–3	1–1	4–0
Paris Saint-Germain	4–0	3–5	0–2	0–2	1–1	3–0		0–0	1–0	1–1	2–0	4–0
Saint-Étienne	4–1	2–1	2–2	1–4	2–4	2–2	2–0		4–2	5–1	0–2	3–2
Soyaux	3–1	0–3	2–3	1–8	0–5	1–3	0–2	2–0		0–1	1–1	0–0
Saint-Brieuc	1–2	4–2	0–3	0–5	0–3	0–1	0–0	0–0	1–3		5–2	3–0
Toulouse	7–1	2–4	1–3	0–5	1–2	1–0	0–2	3–1	2–2	3–2		2–1
Vendenheim	2–2	2–5	0–1	0–3	1–4	0–4	1–1	0–2	1–2	2–2	0–2	

Legend: Blue = home team win; Yellow = draw; Red = away team win.

== Stats ==
=== Top goalscorers ===
Rank	Scorer	Club	Goals
1	(Brazil) Kátia	Lyon	27
2	(France) Sandrine Brétigny	Lyon	22
3	(France) Elodie Ramos	Montpellier	19

Source: StatsFootFeminin
