= Paris derby (women) =

Football rivalry in France

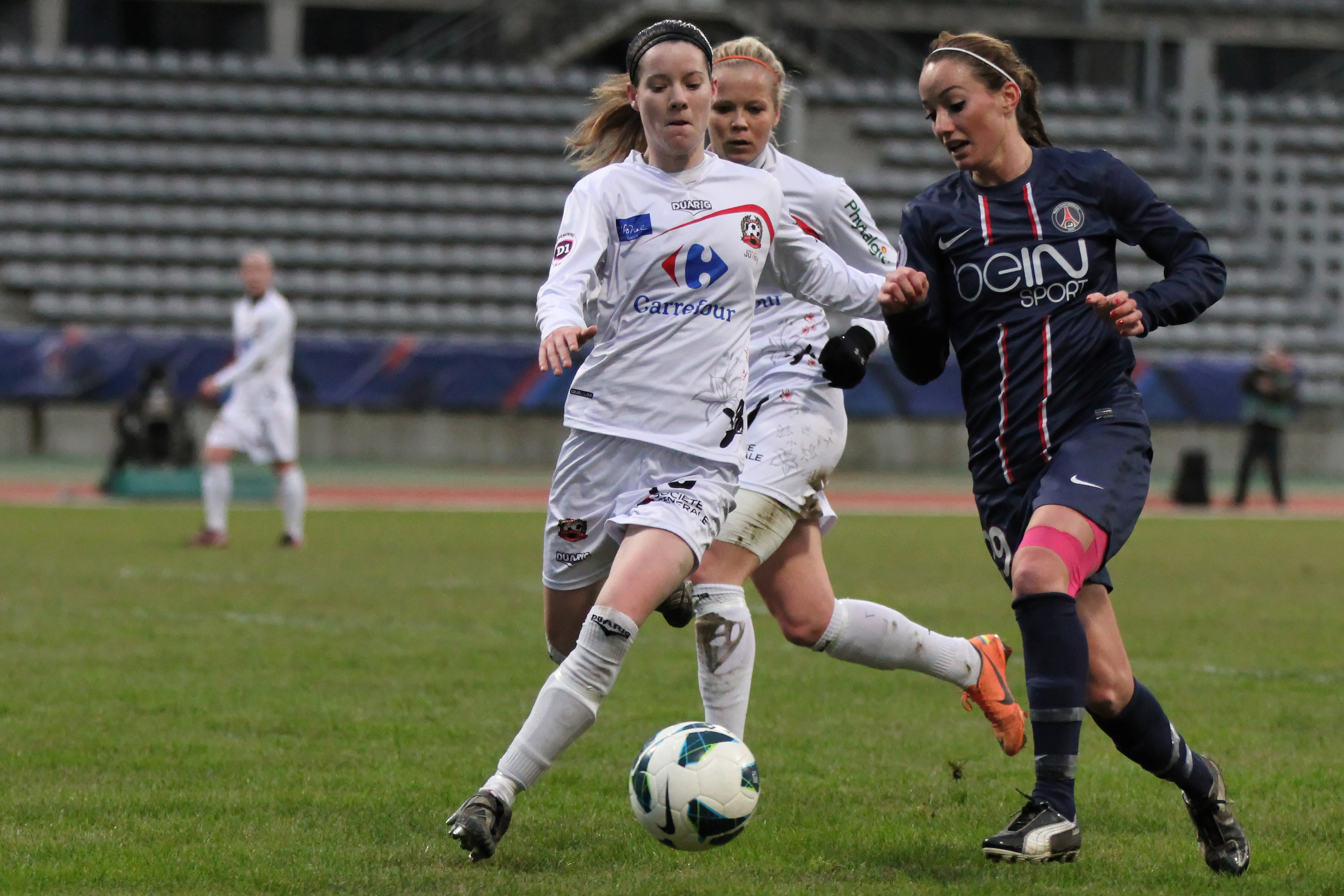
- League match between PSG and Paris FC in 2012.
- Other names: Le Derby Francilien
- Location: Paris
- Teams: Paris Saint-Germain FC (women); Paris FC (women)
- First meeting: 27 October 1979; Première Ligue; Paris Saint-Germain 1–2 Paris FC
- Stadiums: Parc des Princes (PSG); Stade Sébastien Charléty (Paris FC)

Statistics
- Total meetings: 84
- Most wins: Paris Saint-Germain (35)
- Most player appearances: Gaëtane Thiney (40)
- Top scorer: Marie-Antoinette Katoto (15)
- All-time record: Paris Saint-Germain: 35; Draw: 19; Paris FC: 30
- Largest victory: 5 May 2005; Coupe de France Féminine; Paris Saint-Germain 0–7 Paris FC

The Paris derby (French: Derby de Paris), also referred to as Le Derby Francilien, is a French football rivalry contested between Paris Saint-Germain FC (women) (PSG) and Paris FC (women) (PFC), the two largest professional women's clubs based in Paris, France. Both PFC (formerly Juvisy) and PSG were founded in 1971, making them among the oldest clubs in French women's football.

During the 1990s and 2000s, Juvisy established itself as the dominant Parisian side, regularly competing for national championships alongside OL Lyonnes and benefiting from consistent support from the Essonne departmental council. PSG, in contrast, remained a mid-table club for much of this period, undergoing a squad overhaul in 2005 to promote young talent and restructure the team. Juvisy's sustained strength was highlighted by decisive victories over PSG, illustrating the club's superior resources and squad depth.

PSG gradually closed the gap after 2009, strengthened by key signings and the 2012 takeover by Qatar Sports Investments (QSI), which bolstered the squad and allowed the club to challenge Lyon and assert dominance in the Paris derby. Juvisy's absorption into Paris FC in 2017 created a new dynamic, with PFC seeking to compete with the top teams despite initial difficulties. Throughout the 2010s, PSG largely dominated the derby, while Paris FC emerged as a third force in French women's football during the 2020s.

The Paris derby also extends to men's football, where Paris Saint-Germain FC and Paris FC compete at the highest level. PSG was founded in 1970 and quickly became the leading professional club in the capital, while Paris FC, which split from PSG in 1972, spent decades outside the top flight. Following Paris FC's promotion to Ligue 1 in 2025, the men's derby returned to the French top division for the first time in decades, further intensifying the historical rivalry between the two clubs.

== History ==
=== Juvisy supremacy ===
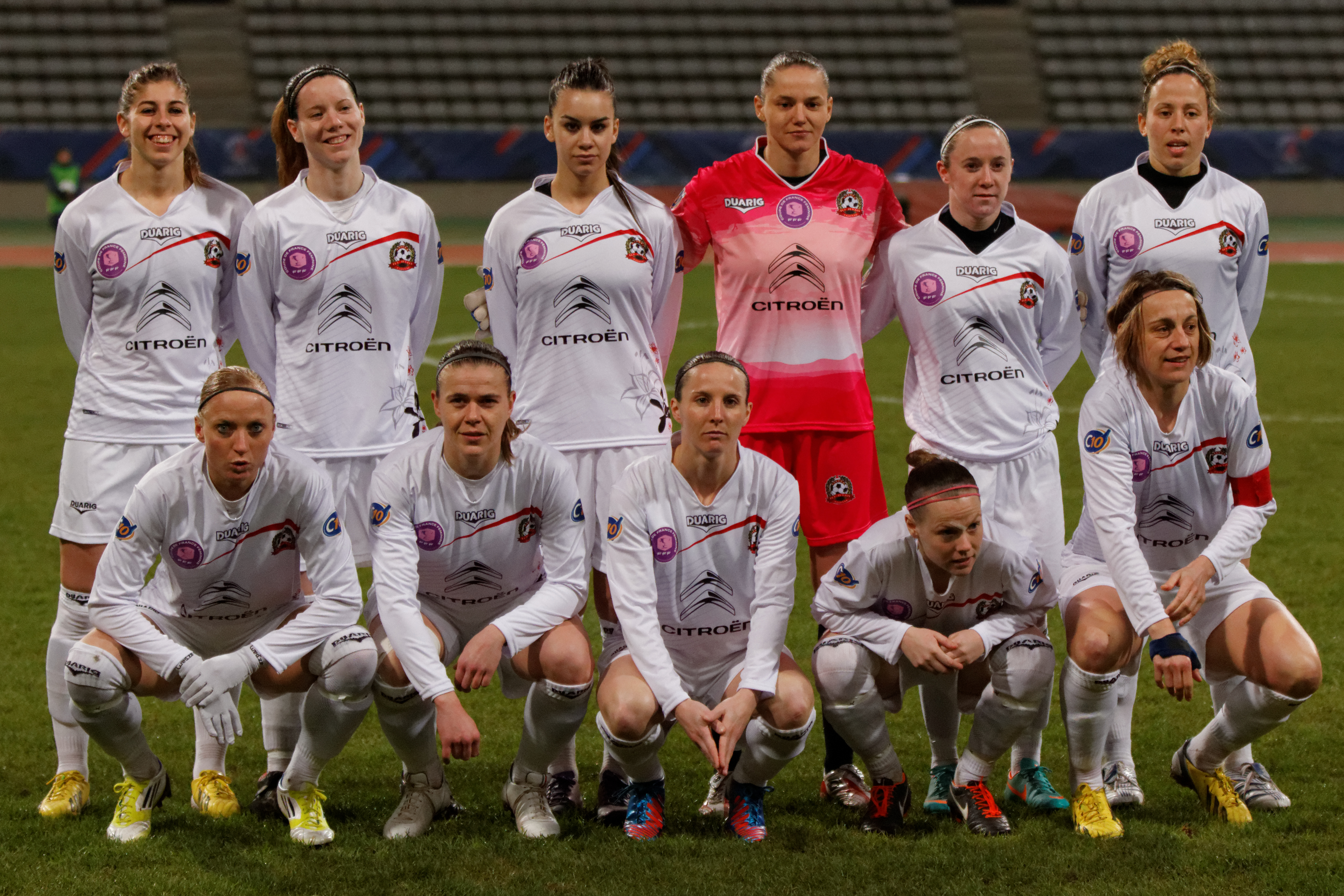
Paris FC before their Coupe de France defeat away to PSG in March 2013.

Both Étoile Sportive de Juvisy-sur-Orge and Paris Saint-Germain FC (women) were founded in 1971, making them among the oldest clubs in French women's football. During the 1990s and 2000s, Juvisy shared championship honours with OL Lyonnes and emerged as the dominant force in the Paris region. At a time when women’s football remained largely amateur, Juvisy benefited from sustained support from the Essonne departmental council, allowing the club to develop stronger organization and resources.

PSG, by contrast, remained a mid-table side, typically finishing between fifth and tenth place. A first restructuring of the team took place in 2005. With the backing of the club, manager Cyril Combettes overhauled the squad, with veterans Ingrid Boyeldieu, Stéphanie Hoffele, and Florence Freyermuth departing and CNFE Clairefontaine graduates Laure Boulleau and Sabrina Delannoy arriving. The club also dissolved its third-division side, leaving PSG with a squad of roughly 20 players for the season.

Juvisy, meanwhile, required no major overhaul. The club compensated for the retirement of Stéphanie Mugneret-Béghé and the maternity leave of Aline Riera by signing internationals Anne-Laure Casseleux and Amélie Coquet, who joined eight other French internationals already at the club. Led by captain Sandrine Soubeyrand, Juvisy recorded 21 wins, one defeat, and 85 goals during the campaign. The side defeated PSG 4–0 in the league, with goals from Marinette Pichon, Élise Bussaglia, Virginie Mendes, and Laëtitia Tonazzi.

The return fixture proved even more one-sided, as Juvisy defeated PSG 5–0 at the Stade Georges-Maquin. Marinette Pichon scored a hat-trick, while Peggy Provost and Sandrine Soubeyrand added further goals. With several players unavailable, PSG took the field with only nine outfield players, including two goalkeepers: captain Bérangère Sapowicz in goal and reserve goalkeeper Cécilie Quatredeniers deployed at left-back. Although PSG had defeated Juvisy twice during their first two seasons in the Première Ligue, Juvisy subsequently established clear dominance in the fixture, recording 11 wins and two draws between 2003 and 2010. In domestic cup competitions, their first meeting in 2005 ended in a comprehensive 7–0 victory for Juvisy, while the second, in 2008, was won by PSG thanks to a brace from Marie-Laure Delie, allowing the club to reach the final at the Stade de France.

=== PSG's rise and PFC takeover ===
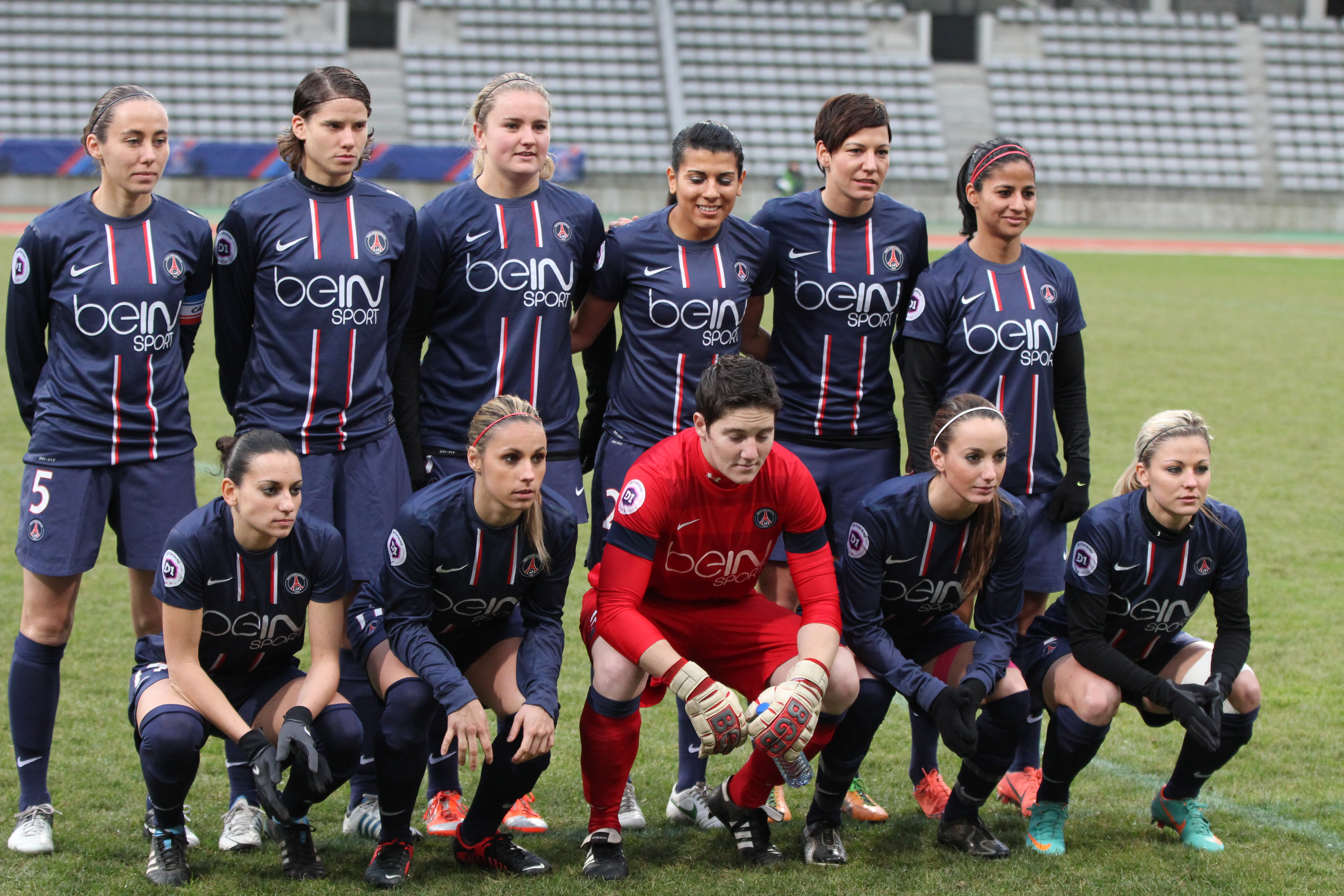
PSG ahead of their home league victory against Paris FC in December 2012.

PSG did not begin to challenge consistently at the top of the table until 2009, a season marked by the signings of Élise Bussaglia, Jessica Houara, and Julie Soyer, as well as short-term spells by Americans Camille Abily and Sonia Bompastor. On 18 October 2009, PSG played their first match at the Parc des Princes, winning through a goal from Abily, a result that coincided with a gradual rebalancing of the rivalry during the following decade.

PSG were further strengthened following the takeover by Qatar Sports Investments (QSI) in 2012, developing a fierce rivalry with Lyon, winning several national titles, and reaching two UEFA Women's Champions League finals. During the 2010s, PSG largely dominated the Paris derby, reflecting the financial disparity created by QSI investment. Juvisy's victory in the derby on 6 December 2013, when captain Sandrine Soubeyrand led the side to a 1–0 win over PSG, was the club's last for nearly 13 years.

In June 2017, Paris FC (women) absorbed Juvisy with the aim of challenging Lyon and PSG for the top positions. Despite substantial investment, Paris FC initially struggled to reach the podium. Meanwhile, PSG claimed their first league title in 2021, the first by a Parisian club since Juvisy in 2006. During the 2020s, Paris FC gradually established itself as the third force in the Première Ligue, notably defeating PSG in the 2025 Coupe de France Féminine final on penalties following a goalless draw in May 2025.

PSG responded with a 3–0 away victory over Paris FC in the championship semi-final at the Stade Sébastien Charléty, denying PFC captain Gaëtane Thiney a place in the final and marking the final match of her career. PSG followed this with another 3–0 victory in the Coupe LFFP semi-finals in February 2026. Playing at the Campus PSG, second-half goals from Romée Leuchter, Merveille Kanjinga, and Rasheedat Ajibade secured PSG's place in the final.

The rematch of the previous French Cup final also went in favour of PSG, who defeated Paris FC 2–1 in the semi-finals at the Campus PSG in April 2026. Reduced to ten players for the entire second half, and then to nine for the final ten minutes, PSG secured qualification thanks to goals from Anaïs Ebayilin and Leuchter, the latter converting a penalty after an early own goal from Élisa De Almeida on the counterattack. Having failed to defeat PSG in their previous four meetings across all competitions that season, Paris FC eventually secured victory in the most decisive encounter: the Première Ligue play-off semi-final in May 2026. PSG created several chances throughout the match at the Stade Jean-Bouin but were unable to convert them. A late goal from former PSG player Hawa Sangaré gave Paris FC their first derby victory since 2013 and qualified the club for the final against Lyon.

== Statistics ==
As of 1 November 2026.

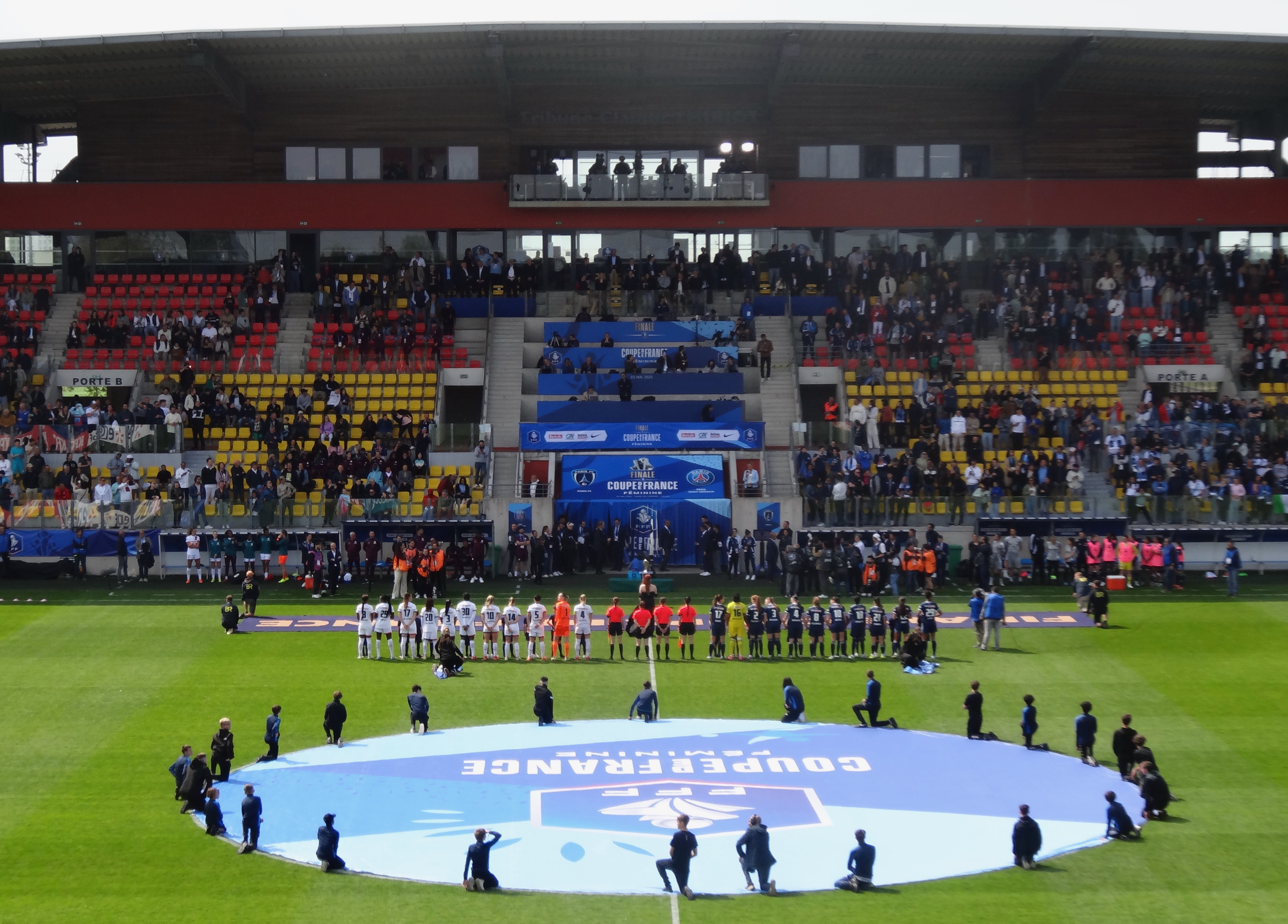
Paris FC defeated PSG in the 2025 Coupe de France Féminine final.

Paris Saint-Germain Paris FC Draw

=== Honours ===
Competition	Titles won	
Competition	PSG	PFC
Première Ligue	1	6
Coupe de France Féminine	4	2
Overall total	5	8

=== Head-to-head ===
Competition	Matches	Wins		Draws	Goals		Goal difference	
Competition	Matches	PSG	PFC	Draws	PSG	PFC	PSG	PFC
Première Ligue	72	28	29	15	93	93	0	0
Coupe de France Féminine	11	6	1	4	20	13	+7	−7
Coupe LFFP	1	1	0	0	3	0	+3	−3
Total	84	35	30	19	116	106	+10	−10

== Matches ==
As of 1 November 2026.

Paris Saint-Germain Paris FC Draw

=== Première Ligue ===
Première Ligue matches

27 October 1979 Matchday 5	Paris Saint-Germain	1–2	Paris FC
		Report

23 March 1980 Matchday 12	Paris FC	1–2	Paris Saint-Germain
		Report

14 September 1980 Matchday 1	Paris Saint-Germain	0–1	Paris FC
		Report

29 November 1980 Matchday 8	Paris FC	0–1	Paris Saint-Germain
		Report

4 October 1981 Matchday 1	Paris Saint-Germain	0–0	Paris FC
		Report

31 January 1982 Matchday 8	Paris FC	3–0	Paris Saint-Germain
		Report

17 October 1982 Matchday 4	Paris FC	1–0	Paris Saint-Germain
		Report

28 November 1982 Matchday 9	Paris Saint-Germain	0–0	Paris FC
		Report

9 October 1983 Matchday 3	Paris Saint-Germain	0–2	Paris FC
		Report

20 November 1983 Matchday 8	Paris FC	4–2	Paris Saint-Germain
		Report

30 September 1984 Matchday 2	Paris Saint-Germain	1–3	Paris FC
		Report

18 November 1984 Matchday 7	Paris FC	2–0	Paris Saint-Germain
		Report

8 November 1987 Matchday 7	Paris FC	4–0	Paris Saint-Germain
		Report

20 March 1988 Matchday 16	Paris Saint-Germain	1–0	Paris FC
		Report

18 September 1988 Matchday 1	Paris Saint-Germain	1–5	Paris FC
		Report

22 January 1989 Matchday 10	Paris FC	0–3	Paris Saint-Germain
		Report

16 October 1994 Matchday 5	Paris FC	2–1	Paris Saint-Germain
		Report

19 March 1995 Matchday 16	Paris Saint-Germain	0–1	Paris FC
		Report

23 September 2001 Matchday 3	Paris Saint-Germain	2–1	Paris FC
	Basse 28'; Boyeldieu 40'	Report	Riera 78' (pen.)

26 January 2002 Matchday 13	Paris FC	2–0	Paris Saint-Germain
	Soubeyrand 66'; Richoux 86'	Report

20 October 2002 Matchday 6	Paris FC	1–2	Paris Saint-Germain
	Mugneret-Béghé 78'	Report	Boyeldieu 73', 84'

9 February 2003 Matchday 16	Paris Saint-Germain	0–2	Paris FC
		Report	Perraudeau 69'; Cousset 85'

26 October 2003 Matchday 3	Paris Saint-Germain	0–1	Paris FC	Bougival
		Report	Svaluto 75'	Stadium: Stade de la Banque de France; Attendance: 200; Referee: Pascale Blin

25 January 2004 Matchday 13	Paris FC	3–1	Paris Saint-Germain	Viry-Châtillon
	Mendes 38'; Dupont 43'; Provost 61'	Report	Hoffele 29'	Stadium: Stade Raoul Perrin; Attendance: 200; Referee: Fabienne Sagnier

7 November 2004 Matchday 8	Paris FC	1–0	Paris Saint-Germain	Viry-Châtillon
	Tonazzi 62'	Report		Stadium: Stade Georges-Maquin; Attendance: 250; Referee: Christelle Laboureyras

20 March 2005 Matchday 18	Paris Saint-Germain	0–4	Paris FC	Saint-Germain-en-Laye
		Report	Pichon 40', 58'; Guyennot 65'; Provost 75'	Stadium: Stade Georges Lefèvre; Attendance: 100; Referee: Ludivine Coetmeur-Denmat

18 September 2005 Matchday 3	Paris Saint-Germain	0–4	Paris FC	Saint-Germain-en-Laye
		Report	Pichon 38'; Bussaglia 43'; Mendes 76'; Tonazzi 83'	Stadium: Stade Georges Lefèvre; Attendance: 60; Referee: Laure Courtas

18 December 2005 Matchday 13	Paris FC	5–0	Paris Saint-Germain	Viry-Châtillon
	Pichon 22', 65', 75'; Provost 69'; Soubeyrand 78'	Report		Stadium: Stade Georges-Maquin; Attendance: 300; Referee: Marylin Rémy

17 September 2006 Matchday 3	Paris FC	1–0	Paris Saint-Germain	Viry-Châtillon
	Legrand 40' (o.g.)	Report		Stadium: Stade Georges-Maquin; Attendance: 150; Referee: Sabrina Himber

15 April 2007 Matchday 13	Paris Saint-Germain	2–2	Paris FC	Saint-Germain-en-Laye
	Ben Abdelwahab 27'; Boulleau 66'	Report	Pichon 18'; Tonazzi 48'	Stadium: Camp des Loges; Attendance: 200; Referee: Morgane Onfroy

11 November 2007 Matchday 7	Paris FC	1–1	Paris Saint-Germain	Viry-Châtillon
15:15	Tonazzi 22'	Report	Pizzala 28'	Stadium: Stade Georges-Maquin; Attendance: 200; Referee: Jean-François Patmaby

6 April 2008 Matchday 17	Paris Saint-Germain	0–2	Paris FC	Saint-Germain-en-Laye
15:00		Report	Dany 47'; Tonazzi 55'	Stadium: Camp des Loges; Attendance: 180; Referee: Manuela Nicolosi

14 September 2008 Matchday 4	Paris Saint-Germain	0–2	Paris FC	Saint-Germain-en-Laye
15:00		Report	Soubeyrand 84'; Lebailly 85'	Stadium: Camp des Loges; Attendance: 200; Referee: Karine Lasalle

8 February 2009 Matchday 14	Paris FC	2–1	Paris Saint-Germain	Viry-Châtillon
14:30	Tonazzi 71', 85'	Report	Prévost 36'	Stadium: Stade Georges-Maquin; Attendance: 200; Referee: Élodie Coppola

18 October 2009 Matchday 4	Paris Saint-Germain	1–0	Paris FC	Paris
16:00	Abily 6'	Report		Stadium: Parc des Princes; Attendance: 5,892; Referee: Élodie Coppola

11 April 2010 Matchday 14	Paris FC	3–0	Paris Saint-Germain	Bondoufle
16:00	Coquet 13'; Tonazzi 54'; Rabanne 66'	Report		Stadium: Stade Robert Bobin; Attendance: 1,100; Referee: Sabine Bonnin

15 December 2010 Matchday 8	Paris FC	0–0	Paris Saint-Germain	Bondoufle
20:00		Report		Stadium: Stade Robert Bobin; Attendance: 70; Referee: Stéphanie Frappart

27 March 2011 Matchday 18	Paris Saint-Germain	3–1	Paris FC	Saint-Germain-en-Laye
15:00	Pizzala 20'; Kátia 44'; Houara 75'	Report	Thiney 38'	Stadium: Stade Georges Lefèvre; Attendance: 400; Referee: Nathalie Mittelbronn

6 November 2011 Matchday 8	Paris FC	1–0	Paris Saint-Germain	Sainte-Geneviève-des-Bois
15:00	Thiney 8'	Report		Stadium: Stade Léo Lagrange; Attendance: 1,227; Referee: Élodie Coppola

25 March 2012 Matchday 18	Paris Saint-Germain	1–3	Paris FC	Sannois
19:30	Blanc 23'	Report	Cayman 16'; Thiney 49' (pen.); Mendes 55'	Stadium: Parc des Sports Michel Hidalgo; Attendance: 1,700; Referee: Lugdivine Cinquini

9 December 2012 Matchday 11	Paris Saint-Germain	2–1	Paris FC	Paris
16:15	Heaps 59'; Bresonik 84'	Report	Pons 12' (o.g.)	Stadium: Stade Sébastien Charléty; Attendance: 800; Referee: Solenne Bartnik

18 May 2013 Matchday 21	Paris FC	0–2	Paris Saint-Germain	Viry-Châtillon
15:00		Report	Heaps 9', 51'	Stadium: Stade Georges-Maquin; Attendance: 980; Referee: Emili Mougeot

6 December 2013 Matchday 11	Paris Saint-Germain	0–1	Paris FC	Paris
20:55		Report	Brétigny 38'	Stadium: Stade Sébastien Charléty; Attendance: 800; Referee: Sabine Bonnin

24 May 2014 Matchday 21	Paris FC	2–2	Paris Saint-Germain	Bondoufle
18:30	Thiney 6'; Guilbert 85'	Report	Delie 16'; Heaps 74'	Stadium: Stade Robert Bobin; Attendance: 2,500; Referee: Séverine Craipeau

4 October 2014 Matchday 5	Paris Saint-Germain	2–0	Paris FC	Paris
20:50	Asllani 60'; Heaps 74'	Report		Stadium: Stade Sébastien Charléty; Attendance: 1,200; Referee: Aurélie Labadot-Cadinot

9 January 2015 Matchday 15	Paris FC	0–3	Paris Saint-Germain	Bondoufle
20:45		Report	Dali 24' (pen.); Alushi 54'; Seger 80'	Stadium: Stade Robert Bobin; Attendance: 1,850; Referee: Manuela Nicolosi

5 December 2015 Matchday 11	Paris FC	0–5	Paris Saint-Germain	Bondoufle
21:00		Report	Heaps 45'; Cristiane 51'; Mittag 57'; Hamraoui 85'	Stadium: Stade Robert Bobin; Attendance: 2,945; Referee: Florence Guillemin

21 May 2016 Matchday 22	Paris Saint-Germain	2–2	Paris FC	Paris
15:00	Érika 45'; Mittag 83'	Report	Catala 44'; Diani 52'	Stadium: Stade Sébastien Charléty; Attendance: 2,000; Referee: Jennifer Maubacq

10 December 2016 Matchday 10	Paris Saint-Germain	3–0	Paris FC	Saint-Germain-en-Laye
15:00	Delie 35', 55', 65'	Report		Stadium: Stade Georges Lefèvre; Attendance: 447; Referee: Solen Dallongeville

25 February 2017 Matchday 15	Paris FC	1–2	Paris Saint-Germain	Bondoufle
21:00	Thiney 66'	Report	Paredes 62'; Katoto 64'	Stadium: Stade Robert Bobin; Attendance: 1,674; Referee: Florence Guillemin

15 October 2017 Matchday 6	Paris FC	0–1	Paris Saint-Germain	Bondoufle
16:30		Report	Katoto 45'	Stadium: Stade Robert Bobin; Attendance: 1,438; Referee: Anaëlle Loidon

12 March 2018 Matchday 16	Paris Saint-Germain	4–1	Paris FC	Saint-Germain-en-Laye
18:00	Katoto 40', 72' (pen.), 81'; Baltimore 68'	Report	Bourdieu 90+2'	Stadium: Stade Georges Lefèvre; Attendance: 204; Referee: Élodie Coppola

9 September 2018 Matchday 2	Paris Saint-Germain	5–1	Paris FC	Paris
15:00	Katoto 14'; Shuang 39'; Geyoro 50'; Diani 59'; Périsset 67' (pen.)	Report	Périsset 80' (o.g.)	Stadium: Stade Jean-Bouin; Attendance: 1,391; Referee: Élodie Coppola

9 December 2018 Matchday 13	Paris FC	1–3	Paris Saint-Germain	Bondoufle
14:45	Sällström 6'	Report	Dudek 15'; Diani 40', 70'	Stadium: Stade Robert Bobin; Attendance: 2,341; Referee: Camille Soriano

19 October 2019 Matchday 6	Paris Saint-Germain	2–0	Paris FC	Paris
20:45	Katoto 33', 55'	Report		Stadium: Stade Jean-Bouin; Attendance: 1,624; Referee: Savina Elbour

15 December 2019 Matchday 12	Paris FC	0–3	Paris Saint-Germain	Paris
14:45		Report	Katoto 25'; Khelifi 46'; Lawrence 74'	Stadium: Stade Sébastien Charléty; Attendance: 2,174; Referee: Élodie Coppola

6 December 2020 Matchday 10	Paris Saint-Germain	4–1	Paris FC	Saint-Germain-en-Laye
14:45	Butel 2' (o.g.); Katoto 17'; Baltimore 46'; Bachmann 62'	Report	Viens 82'	Stadium: Stade Georges Lefèvre; Attendance: Behind closed doors Referee: Victoria Beyer

6 May 2021 Matchday 19	Paris FC	2–3	Paris Saint-Germain	Paris
18:30	Catala 79' (pen.); Sow 90+2'	Report	Bruun 21', 72'; Däbritz 67' (pen.)	Stadium: Stade Sébastien Charléty; Attendance: Behind closed doors Referee: Savina Elbour

26 September 2021 Matchday 4	Paris Saint-Germain	4–0	Paris FC	Saint-Germain-en-Laye
12:45	Katoto 18', 26'; Diani 43'; Däbritz 59' (pen.)	Report		Stadium: Stade Georges Lefèvre; Attendance: 623; Referee: Victoria Beyer

3 April 2022 Matchday 18	Paris FC	0–0	Paris Saint-Germain	Paris
12:45		Report		Stadium: Stade Sébastien Charléty; Attendance: 2,519; Referee: Audrey Gerbel

4 December 2022 Matchday 10	Paris FC	0–1	Paris Saint-Germain	Paris
13:00		Report	Baltimore 55'	Stadium: Stade Sébastien Charléty; Attendance: 3,293; Referee: Audrey Gerbel

7 May 2023 Matchday 20	Paris Saint-Germain	0–0	Paris FC	Saint-Germain-en-Laye
15:00		Report		Stadium: Stade Georges Lefèvre; Attendance: 814; Referee: Audrey Gerbel

17 December 2023 Matchday 11	Paris FC	1–2	Paris Saint-Germain	Paris
21:00	Thiney 4'	Report	Baltimore 36' (pen.); Katoto 44'	Stadium: Stade Sébastien Charléty; Attendance: 4,002; Referee: Maïka Vanderstichel

24 April 2024 Matchday 21	Paris Saint-Germain	1–1	Paris FC	Poissy
18:30	Ebayilin 71'	Report	Bussy 30'	Stadium: Campus PSG; Attendance: 702; Referee: Victoria Beyer

11 May 2024 Semi-finals	Paris Saint-Germain	2–2 (5–4 p)	Paris FC	Paris
21:00	Geyoro 52' (pen.); Katoto 72'	Report	Mateo 36'; Corboz 56'	Stadium: Parc des Princes; Attendance: 5,971; Referee: Audrey Gerbel
	Penalties
	Karchaoui (penalty scored); Katoto (penalty scored); Baltimore (penalty scored); Martens (penalty scored); Geyoro (penalty scored)		(penalty scored) Gréboval; (penalty missed) Bourdieu; (penalty scored) Thiney; (penalty scored) Le Mouël; (penalty scored) Sissoko

7 December 2024 Matchday 10	Paris FC	1–1	Paris Saint-Germain	Paris
21:00	Mateo 87'	Report	Echegini 58'	Stadium: Stade Sébastien Charléty; Attendance: 6,667; Referee: Émeline Rochebilière

15 March 2025 Matchday 17	Paris Saint-Germain	0–0	Paris FC	Poissy
21:00		Report		Stadium: Campus PSG; Attendance: 1,029; Referee: Maïka Vanderstichel

11 May 2025 Semi-finals	Paris Saint-Germain	3–0	Paris FC	Paris
21:00	Leuchter 1'; Karchaoui 55'; Shrader 90+1'	Report 1 Report 2		Stadium: Parc des Princes; Attendance: 5,567; Referee: Victoria Beyer

20 December 2025 Matchday 11	Paris Saint-Germain	0–0	Paris FC	Poissy
21:00		Report		Stadium: Campus PSG; Attendance: 1,039; Referee: Maïka Vanderstichel

7 February 2026 Matchday 15	Paris FC	0–3	Paris Saint-Germain	Paris
21:05		Report	Kanjinga 14', 35'; Leuchter 28' (pen.)	Stadium: Stade Sébastien Charléty; Attendance: 4,679; Referee: Audrey Gerbel

16 May 2026 Semi-finals	Paris FC	1–0	Paris Saint-Germain	Paris
21:00	Sangaré 88'	Report		Stadium: Stade Sébastien Charléty; Attendance: 5,542; Referee: Audrey Gerbel

1 November 2026 Matchday 7	Paris FC	1–1	Paris Saint-Germain	Paris
14:30	Mateo 11'	Report	Seweryn 29' (o.g.)	Stadium: Stade Sébastien Charléty; Attendance: 5,201; Referee: Margaux Dru

=== Coupe de France Féminine ===
Coupe de France Féminine matches

5 May 2005 Semi-finals	Paris Saint-Germain	0–7	Paris FC
		Report	Soubeyrand 27', 36'; Mugneret-Béghé 55'; Pichon 57', 72'; Guilbert 65'; Trimoreau 86'

27 April 2008 Semi-finals	Paris FC	1–2	Paris Saint-Germain	Viry-Châtillon
15:00	Anger-Matute 49'	Report	Delie 22', 79'	Stadium: Stade Georges-Maquin; Attendance: 450; Referee: Sabrina Himber

10 March 2012 Round of 16	Paris FC	0–0 (3–4 p)	Paris Saint-Germain	Bondoufle
19:00		Report		Stadium: Stade Robert Bobin; Attendance: 600; Referee: Solenne Bartnik
	Penalties
	Soubeyrand (penalty scored); Guilbert (penalty missed); Thiney (penalty scored); Rabanne (penalty scored); Mendes (penalty missed)		(penalty scored) Delannoy; (penalty scored) Bussaglia; (penalty missed) Coton-Pélagie; (penalty scored) Long; (penalty scored) Debonne

23 March 2013 Round of 16	Paris Saint-Germain	2–0	Paris FC	Paris
21:00	Cruz 6'; Asllani 16'	Report		Stadium: Stade Sébastien Charléty; Attendance: 800; Referee: Florence Guillemin

10 May 2014 Semi-finals	Paris FC	0–6	Paris Saint-Germain	Bondoufle
18:30		Report	Cruz 39'; Heaps 44'; Bresonik 56'; Delie 70', 72', 81'	Stadium: Stade Robert Bobin; Attendance: 958; Referee: Sabine Bonnin

14 February 2016 Round of 16	Paris Saint-Germain	2–0	Paris FC	Paris
16:30	Dahlkvist 42'; Érika 71'	Report		Stadium: Stade Sébastien Charléty; Attendance: 800; Referee: Solenne Bartnik

12 March 2017 Quarter-finals	Paris FC	1–1 (5–6 p)	Paris Saint-Germain	Bondoufle
18:00	Cascarino 81'	Report 1 Report 2 Report 3	Delie 8'	Stadium: Stade Robert Bobin; Attendance: 1,600; Referee: Sabine Bonnin
	Penalties
	Declercq (penalty missed); Diani (penalty missed)		(penalty missed) Andonova; (penalty scored) Delannoy; (penalty scored) Delie; (penalty scored) Cruz

27 January 2018 Round of 32	Paris FC	0–2	Paris Saint-Germain	Paris
14:30		Report	Paredes 80'; Katoto 81'	Stadium: Stade Sébastien Charléty; Attendance: 1,504; Referee: Céline Bagrowski

10 March 2024 Semi-finals	Paris FC	3–3 (3–4 p)	Paris Saint-Germain	Bondoufle
15:00	Thiney 28' (pen.); Karchaoui 64' (o.g.); Ribadeira 71'	Report	Geyoro 13'; Chawinga 56', 85'	Stadium: Stade Robert Bobin; Attendance: 4,359; Referee: Audrey Gerbel
	Penalties
	Gréboval (penalty scored); Bourdieu (penalty scored); Mateo (penalty missed); Corboz (penalty scored); Thiney (penalty missed)		(penalty scored) Karchaoui; (penalty scored) Katoto; (penalty scored) Baltimore; (penalty scored) De Almeida

3 May 2025 Final	Paris FC	0–0 (5–4 p)	Paris Saint-Germain	Calais
15:00		Report		Stadium: Stade de l'Épopée; Attendance: 8,108; Referee: Audrey Gerbel
	Penalties
	Gréboval (penalty scored); Mateo (penalty missed); Korošec (penalty scored); Bussy (penalty scored); Le Mouël (penalty scored); Sissoko (penalty scored)		(penalty scored) Leuchter; (penalty scored) Katoto; (penalty scored) Karchaoui; (penalty missed) Albert; (penalty scored) Mbock Bathy; (penalty missed) Le Guilly

5 April 2026 Semi-finals	Paris Saint-Germain	2–1	Paris FC	Poissy
16:00	Ebayilin 20'; Leuchter 57' (pen.)	Report	De Almeida 3' (o.g.)	Stadium: Campus PSG; Attendance: 858; Referee: Émeline Rochebilière

=== Coupe LFFP ===
Coupe LFFP matches

14 February 2026 Semi-finals	Paris Saint-Germain	3–0	Paris FC	Poissy
17:00	Leuchter 47'; Kanjinga 58'; Ajibade 88'	Report		Stadium: Campus PSG; Attendance: 430; Referee: Alexandra Collin

== Records ==
As of 1 November 2026.

Paris Saint-Germain Paris FC Draw

=== Most appearances ===
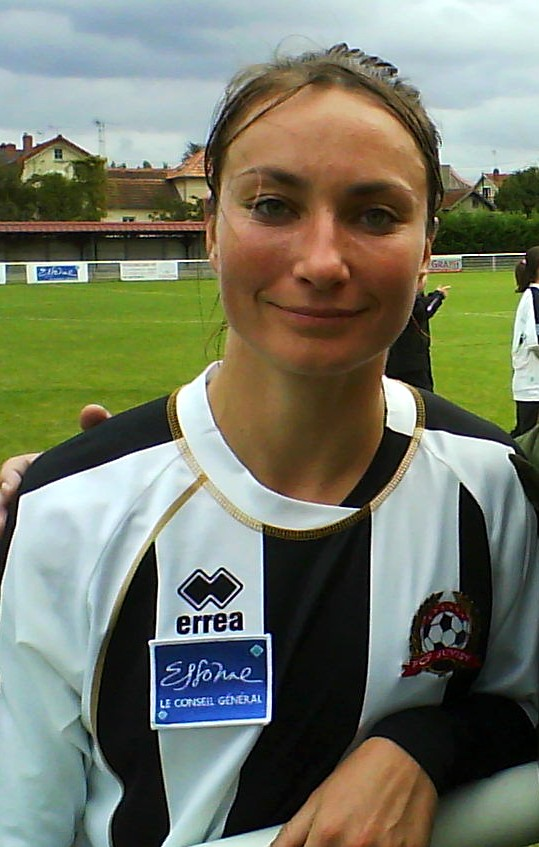
Gaëtane Thiney

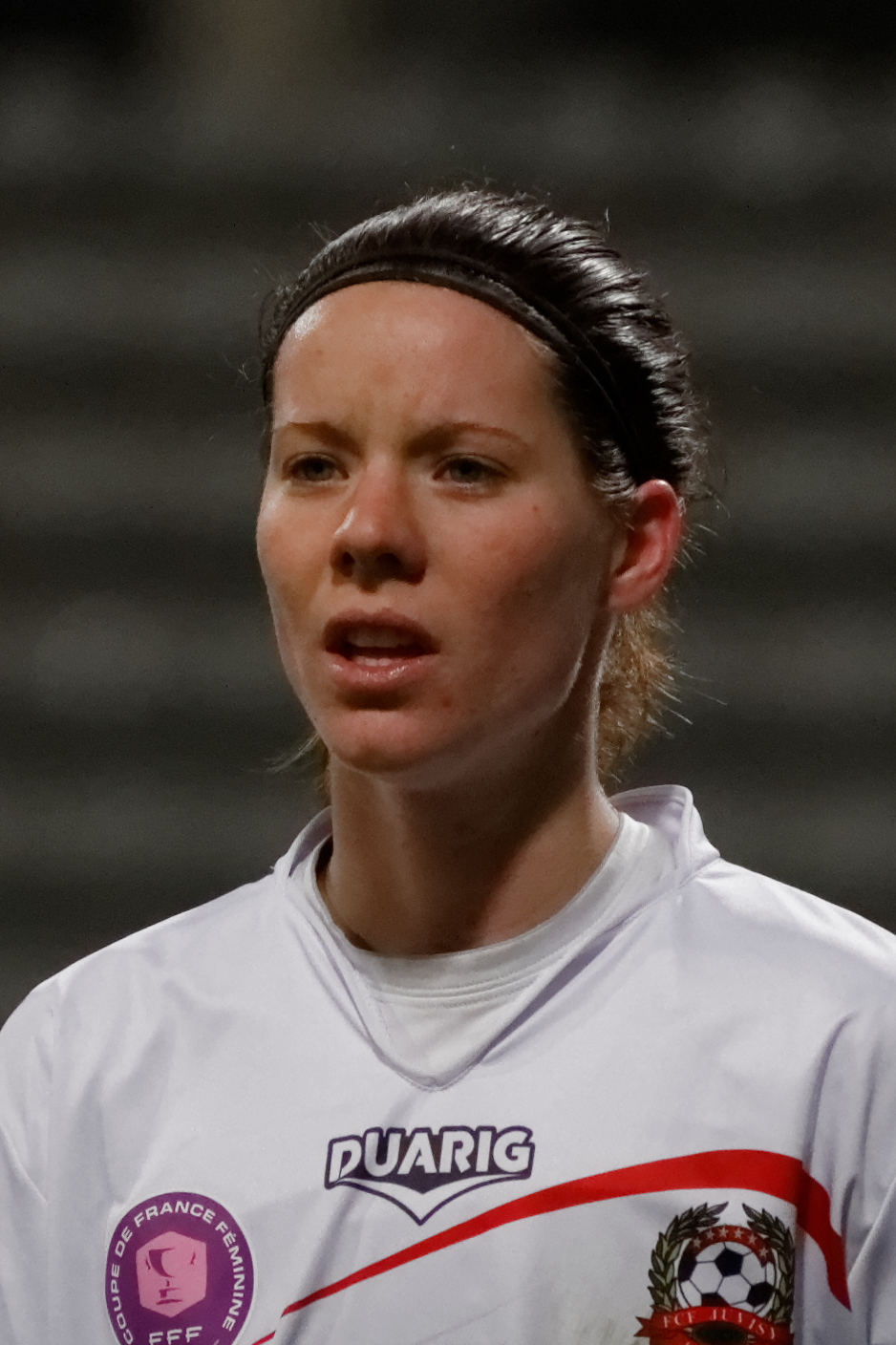
Annaïg Butel

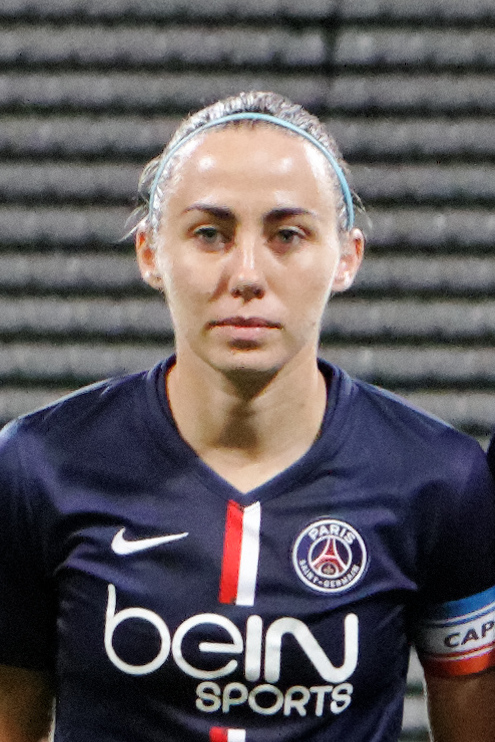
Sabrina Delannoy

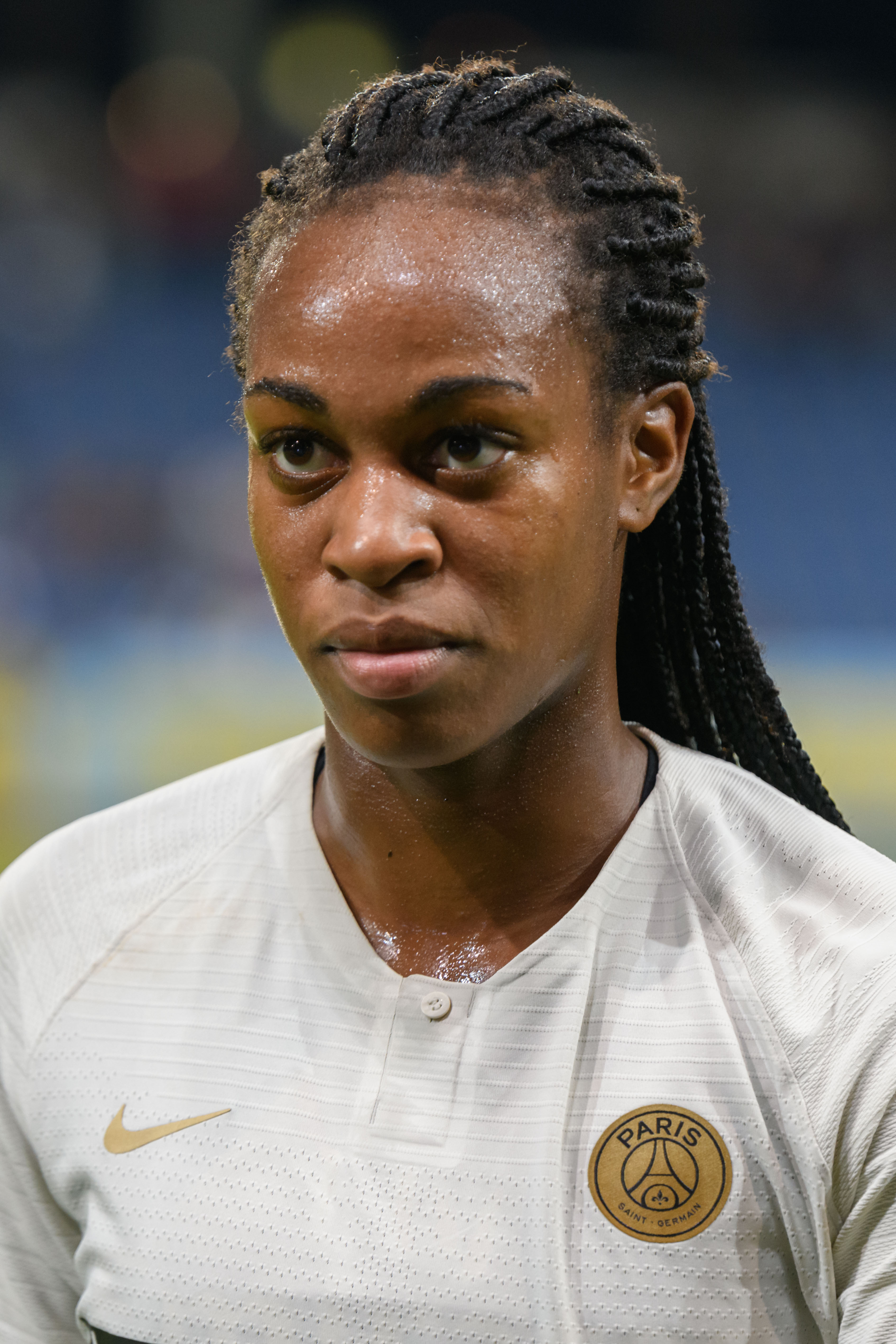
Marie-Antoinette Katoto

Rank	Player	Position	Club	Period	Apps
1	(France) Gaëtane Thiney	MF	PFC	2008–2025	40
2	(France) Annaïg Butel	DF	PFC	2007–2023	32
3	(France) Julie Soyer	DF	PSG	2009–2012	30
3	(France) Julie Soyer	DF	PFC	2012–2024	30
4	(France) Clara Mateo	FW	PFC	2016–	29
5	(France) Sabrina Delannoy	DF	PSG	2005–2017	28
6	(France) Nelly Guilbert	DF	PFC	1998–2016	27
7	(France) Théa Gréboval	DF	PFC	2014–	26
8	(France) Sandrine Soubeyrand	MF	PFC	2000–2014	26

=== Top goalscorers ===
Rank	Player	Position	Club	Period	Goals
1	(France) Marie-Antoinette Katoto	FW	PSG	2015–2025	15
2	(France) Marie-Laure Delie	FW	PSG	2007–2008; 2013–2018	10
3	(France) Marinette Pichon	FW	PFC	2004–2007	9
4	(France) Laëtitia Tonazzi	FW	PFC	2001–2012	8
5	(France) Gaëtane Thiney	MF	PFC	2008–2025	7
6	(United States) Lindsey Heaps	FW	PSG	2012–2016	7

=== Biggest wins ===
Date	Competition	Home team	Result	Away team	Margin
5 May 2005	Coupe de France Féminine	PSG	0–7	PFC	7 goals
10 May 2014	Coupe de France Féminine	PFC	0–6	PSG	6 goals
18 December 2005	Première Ligue	PFC	5–0	PSG	5 goals
26 September 2021	Première Ligue	PSG	4–0	PFC	4 goals

=== Highest-scoring matches ===
Rank	Date	Competition	Home team	Result	Away team	Goals
1	5 May 2005	Coupe de France Féminine	PSG	0–7	PFC	7
2	10 May 2014	Coupe de France Féminine	PFC	0–6	PSG	6
3	20 November 1983	Première Ligue	PFC	4–2	PSG	6
4	18 September 1988	Première Ligue	PSG	1–5	PFC	6
5	9 September 2018	Première Ligue	PSG	5–1	PFC	6
6	10 March 2024	Coupe de France Féminine	PFC	3–3	PSG	6

=== Longest winning runs ===
Rank	Club	From	To	Wins
1	PSG	15 October 2017	26 September 2021	10
2	PFC	9 February 2003	17 September 2006	9
3	PFC	9 October 1983	8 November 1987	5

=== Longest unbeaten runs ===
Rank	Club	From	To	Wins	Draws	Matches
1	PSG	24 May 2014	16 May 2026	23	12	35
2	PFC	9 February 2003	6 April 2008	10	2	12
3	PFC	4 October 1981	8 November 1987	7	2	9

=== Highest attendances ===
Home team	Date	Competition	Stadium	Attendance
Neutral	3 May 2025	Coupe de France Féminine	Stade de l'Épopée	8,108
PFC	7 December 2024	Première Ligue	Stade Sébastien Charléty	6,667
PSG	18 October 2009	Première Ligue	Parc des Princes	5,892

== Playing for both clubs ==
A total of 21 players have played for both clubs during their careers.

=== List of players ===
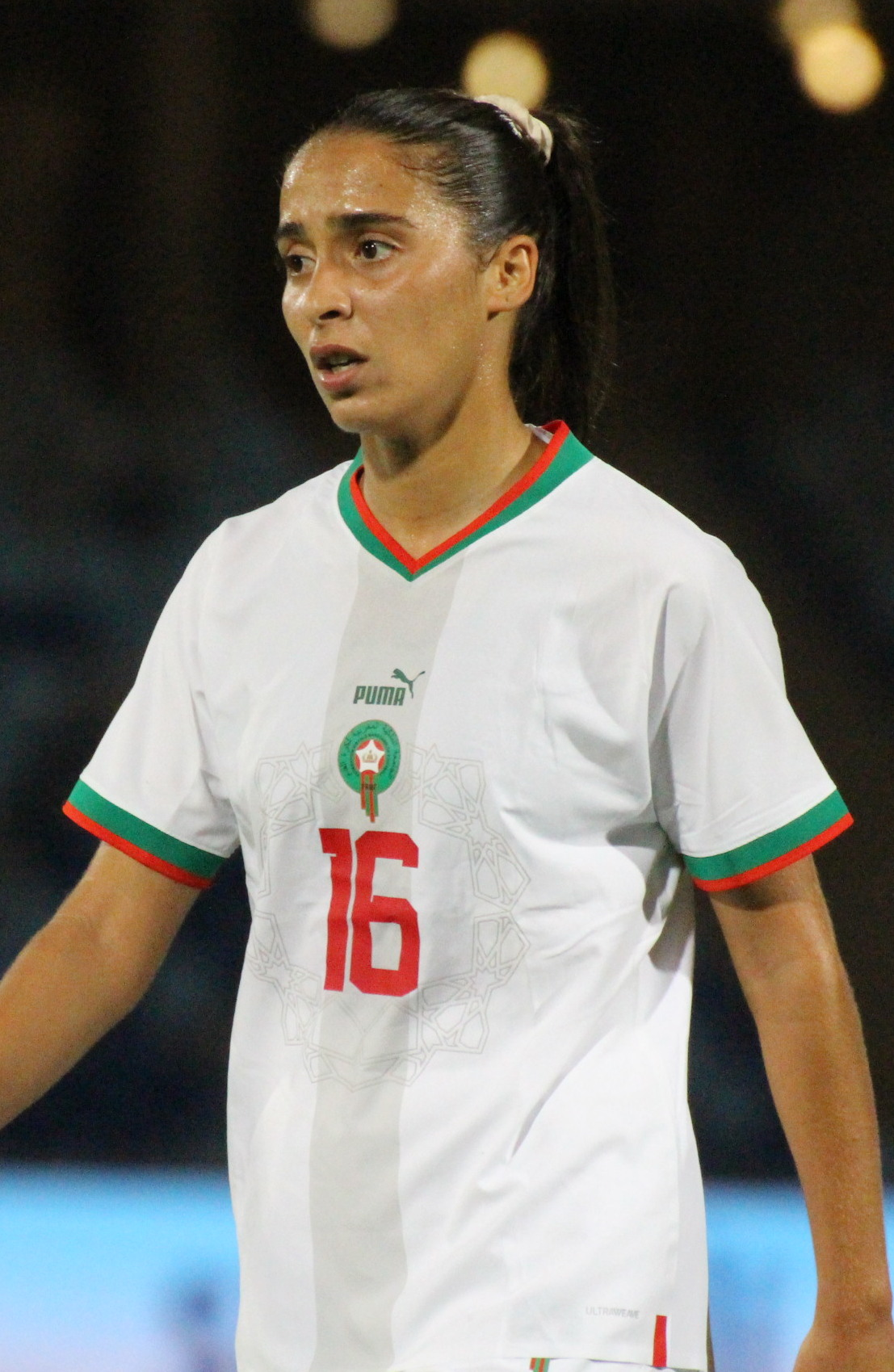
Anissa Lahmari

No.	Player
1	(France) Aïssatou Tounkara
2	(Morocco) Anissa Lahmari
3	(France) Aude Moreau
4	(France) Élisa De Almeida
5	(France) Élise Bussaglia
6	(France) Estelle Cascarino
7	(France) Célina Ould Hocine
8	(France) Céline Deville
9	(France) Florence Freyermuth
10	(France) Hawa Sangaré
11	(France) Inès Dhaou
12	(France) Julie Soyer
13	(France) Kadidiatou Diani
14	(France) Karima Benameur Taieb
15	(France) Laure Lepailleur

No.	Player
16	(France) Léa Declercq
17	(France) Oriane Jean-François
18	(France) Ouleymata Sarr
19	(France) Sarah Bouhaddi
20	(Mali) Teninsoun Sissoko
21	(France) Thiniba Samoura

== Men's derby ==
The men's Paris derby is contested between Paris Saint-Germain FC (PSG) and Paris FC (PFC). PSG, founded in 1970 through the merger of Paris FC and Stade Saint-Germain, has grown into the dominant club in both the capital and French football, regularly competing in Ligue 1 and European competitions. Paris FC, which split from PSG in 1972, spent decades in the lower divisions before returning to the top flight in 2025.

The rivalry traces its roots to the early history of football in the French capital, where historic clubs like Racing Club de France Football and Red Star FC once competed. PSG emerged from efforts by the French Football Federation (FFF) to create a major inner‑city club in the late 1960s, while Paris FC originally remained in Ligue 1 following the 1972 split. PSG quickly established itself as the capital's leading club, taking over the Parc des Princes and embarking on a period of sustained success that left Paris FC largely absent from the top tier. Consequently, first‑team meetings between the two were rare for decades.

Following Paris FC's promotion to Ligue 1 in 2025, the Paris derby returned as a significant fixture in French football. The two clubs' home stadiums—PSG's Parc des Princes and PFC's Stade Jean-Bouin—are separated by only a short distance, creating one of the closest geographic derbies in world football. The first top‑flight meeting since 1990 took place on 4 January 2026 at the Parc des Princes, with PSG winning 2–1 in a closely contested match. A subsequent Coupe de France encounter saw Paris FC secure a 1–0 victory, marking PSG's first home defeat in the competition in several years.
