= 2025 Coupe de France Féminine final =

- Match programme cover
- Event: 2024–25 Coupe de France Féminine
Paris FC	Paris Saint-Germain
Première Ligue	Première Ligue
0	0
- Paris FC won 5–4 on penalties
- Date: 3 May 2025
- Venue: Stade de l'Épopée, Calais
- Referee: Audrey Gerbel (France)
- Attendance: 8,108
- Weather: Partly cloudy 17 °C (63 °F); 60% humidity

The 2025 Coupe de France Féminine final was the final match of the 2024–25 Coupe de France Féminine, the 24th season of France's women's football club knockout cup competition organised by the French Football Federation. The match was played at Le Stade de l'Épopée in Calais, Hauts-de-France, on 3 May 2025, between Première Ligue sides Paris FC and Paris Saint-Germain.

Paris FC won the match 5–4 on penalties after a scoreless draw, dethroning Paris Saint-Germain to claim their second title, and their first under the name Paris FC.

== Teams ==
Team	Previous finals appearances (bold indicates winners)
Paris FC	1 (**2005**)
Paris Saint-Germain	9 (2008, **2010**, 2014, 2017, **2018**, 2020, **2022**, 2023, **2024**)

The final was a Parisian derby between PSG and Paris FC, marking the first all-Paris showdown in the competition's history. PSG, four-time winners, and current defending champions, played their fifth consecutive final, while Paris FC returned to the final for the first time since 2005, when they won the trophy as FCF Juvisy.

== Venue ==
On 17 January 2025, the FFF Executive Committee announced the selection of Stade de l'Épopée, Calais to host the 2025 final. it will be the second time the stadium hosts the final of the Coupe de France Féminine, having last hosted the 2015 final, where Olympique Lyonnais defeated Montpellier to claim their fifth title.

== Route to the final ==
Note: In all results below, the score of the finalist is given first (H: home; A: away).

Paris FC		Round	Paris Saint-Germain	
Opponent	Result	Final Phase	Opponent	Result
RC Roubaix Wervicq	5–0 (A)	Round of 32	Croix Blanche Angers	3–0 (A)
ESOF Vendée La Roche	6–0 (A)	Round of 16	FC Nantes	6–1 (A)
Dijon FCO	2–0 (H)	Quarter-finals	Le Mans FC	4–0 (A)
Le Havre AC	2–1 (A)	Semi-finals	AS Saint-Étienne	2–1 (A)

== Match ==
=== Summary ===
In the early stages of the matches, Paris FC threatened first through Clara Matéo and Gaëtane Thiney, whose shot in the 5th minute narrowly missed the post. The early exchanges saw PSG struggle to find rhythm, while the PFC defense held firm. In the 28th minute, Thiney thought she had opened the scoring, but her goal was ruled out for offside. Minutes later, Albert nearly gave PSG the lead but missed the target. PSG gained momentum late in the half, but Leuchter squandered a good chance just before the break. The first half ended goalless.

After the restart, Paris FC came out stronger, testing PSG keeper Katarzyna Kiedrzynek multiple times through Bussy and Garbino. PSG responded by introducing Karchaoui and Katoto at the hour mark, and the dynamic shifted. Geyoro missed a one-on-one before Leuchter had a goal disallowed for offside in the 68th minute. Katoto's curling effort went just wide in the 81st minute, and in stoppage time, she missed a golden opportunity to seal victory after Nnazodie misjudged a cross. With the score still 0–0 after 90 minutes, the match went straight to penalties.

In the shootout, Gréboval gave PFC the lead before Matéo hit the bar. Both teams converted their next attempts until Albert's shot was saved by Nnazodie, giving PFC the edge. Le Guilly's decisive effort was stopped again by Nnazodie, handing Paris FC a 5–4 win and their first trophy under the club's new identity.

=== Details ===
3 May 2025
14:00

Paris FC (1)	0–0	(1) Paris Saint-Germain
	Report
Penalties
Greboval (penalty scored); Matéo (penalty missed); Korošec (penalty scored); Bussy (penalty scored); Le Mouël (penalty scored); Sissoko (penalty scored)	5–4	(penalty scored) Leuchter; (penalty scored) Katoto; (penalty scored) Karchaoui; (penalty missed) Albert; (penalty scored) Mbock Bathy; (penalty missed) Le Guilly

Stade de l'Épopée, Calais
Attendance: 8,108
Referee: Audrey Gerbel

**Paris FC**	**Paris SG**

GK	16	(Nigeria) Chiamaka Nnadozie
CB	2	(France) Célina Ould Hocine	(substituted off) 89'
CB	29	(United States) Deja Davis
RB	18	(France) Melween N'Dongala
LB	3	(France) Lou Bogaert
AM	17	(France) Gaëtane Thiney	(substituted off) 76'
RW	21	(France) Maëlle Garbino	(substituted off) 89'
CM	8	(France) Daphne Corboz	(substituted off) 72'
DM	4	(Slovenia) Kaja Korošec
CF	10	(France) Clara Matéo
LW	22	(France) Kessya Bussy
Substitutes:
MF	15	(France) Margaux Le Mouël	(substituted on) 72'
MF	31	(France) Kenza Roche Dufour	(substituted on) 76'
DF	23	(Mali) Teninsoun Sissoko	(substituted on) 89'
DF	19	(France) Théa Greboval	(substituted on) 89'
MF	5	(Australia) Sarah Hunter
GK	1	(France) Inès Marques
DF	33	(France) Manon Germinal
Manager:
(France) Sandrine Soubeyrand

GK	1	(Poland) Katarzyna Kiedrzynek
CB	29	(France) Griedge Mbock Bathy
CB	4	(Poland) Paulina Dudek		(substituted off) 72'
RB	5	(France) Élisa De Almeida
LB	20	(France) Tara Elimbi Gilbert	(yellow card) 31'	(substituted off) 61'
LW	3	(United States) Crystal Dunn
CM	14	(Netherlands) Jackie Groenen
CM	8	(France) Grace Geyoro		(substituted off) 90+2'
CM	10	(United States) Korbin Albert
ST	17	(Netherlands) Romée Leuchter
RW	30	(Democratic Republic of the Congo) Merveille Kanjinga		(substituted off) 60'
Substitutes:
DF	7	(France) Sakina Karchaoui		(substituted on) 60'
FW	9	(France) Marie-Antoinette Katoto		(substituted on) 61'
DF	28	(France) Jade Le Guilly		(substituted on) 72'
FW	6	(Nigeria) Jennifer Echegini		(substituted on) 90+2'
GK	27	(England) Mary Earps
MF	95	(France) Laurina Fazer
DF	19	(United States) Eva Gaetino
Manager:
(France) Fabrice Abriel

Assistant referees:
Clémentine Dubreil
Siham Boudina
Reserve assistant referee:
Romy Fournier
Video assistant referee:
Willy Delajod
Assistant video assistant referee:
Elisa Daupeux

**Match rules**

- 90 minutes
- Penalty shoot-out if scores level
- Maximum of seven named substitutes
- Maximum of five substitutions
