= Capy =

Capy is a French surname. Notable people with the surname include:

- Marcelle Capy (1891–1962), French novelist
- Sandrine Capy (born 1969), French football player
