= Sandrine Mathivet =

French association football player

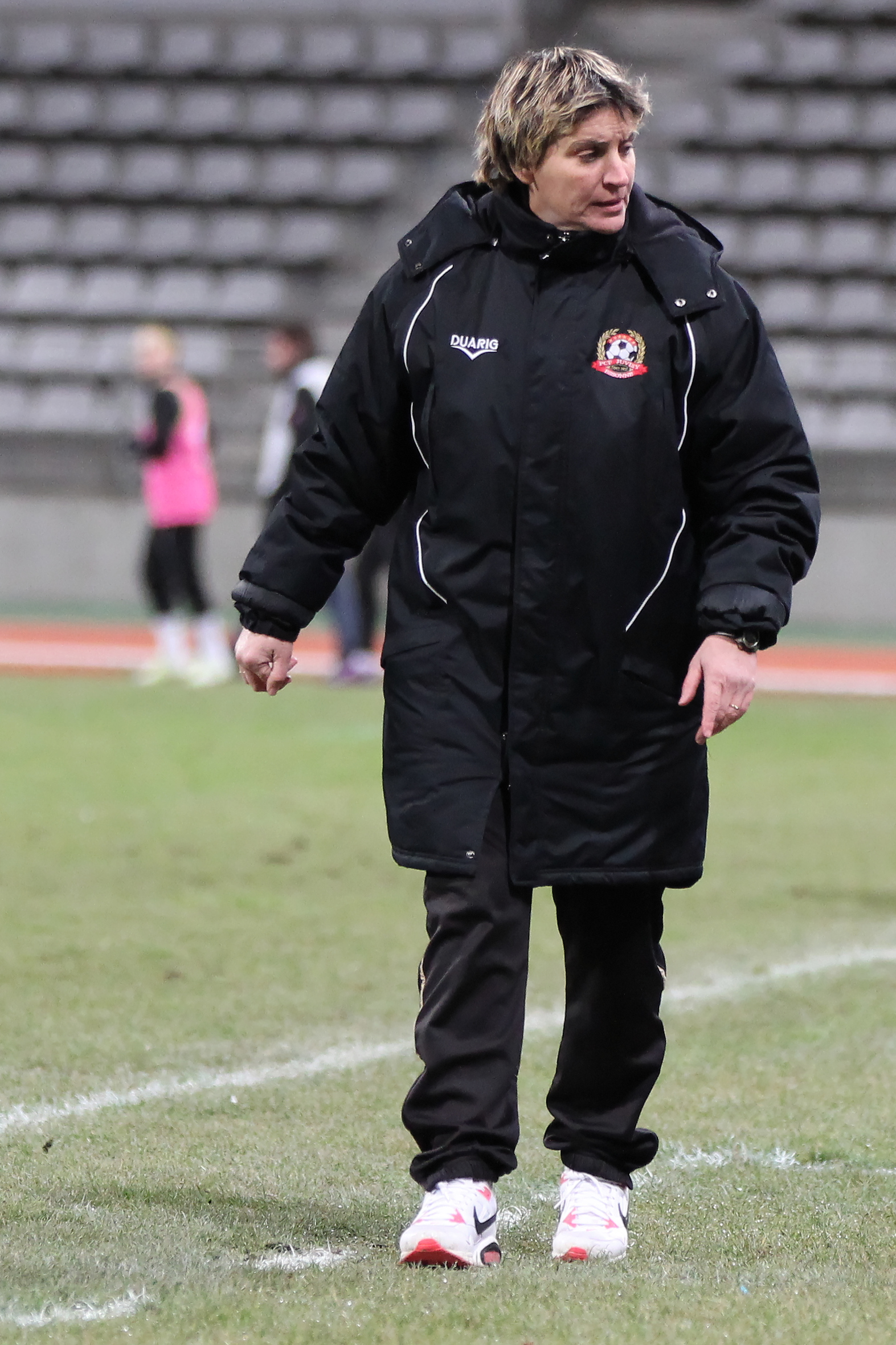

Personal information
- Date of birth: 25 October 1968 (age 58)

Managerial career
- Years: Team
- 2009-2013: FCF Juvisy
- 2016-2017: Dijon FCO

Sandrine Mathivet (born 25 October 1968) is a French football manager for FCF Juvisy.
