= Nelly Guilbert =

French footballer (born 1979)

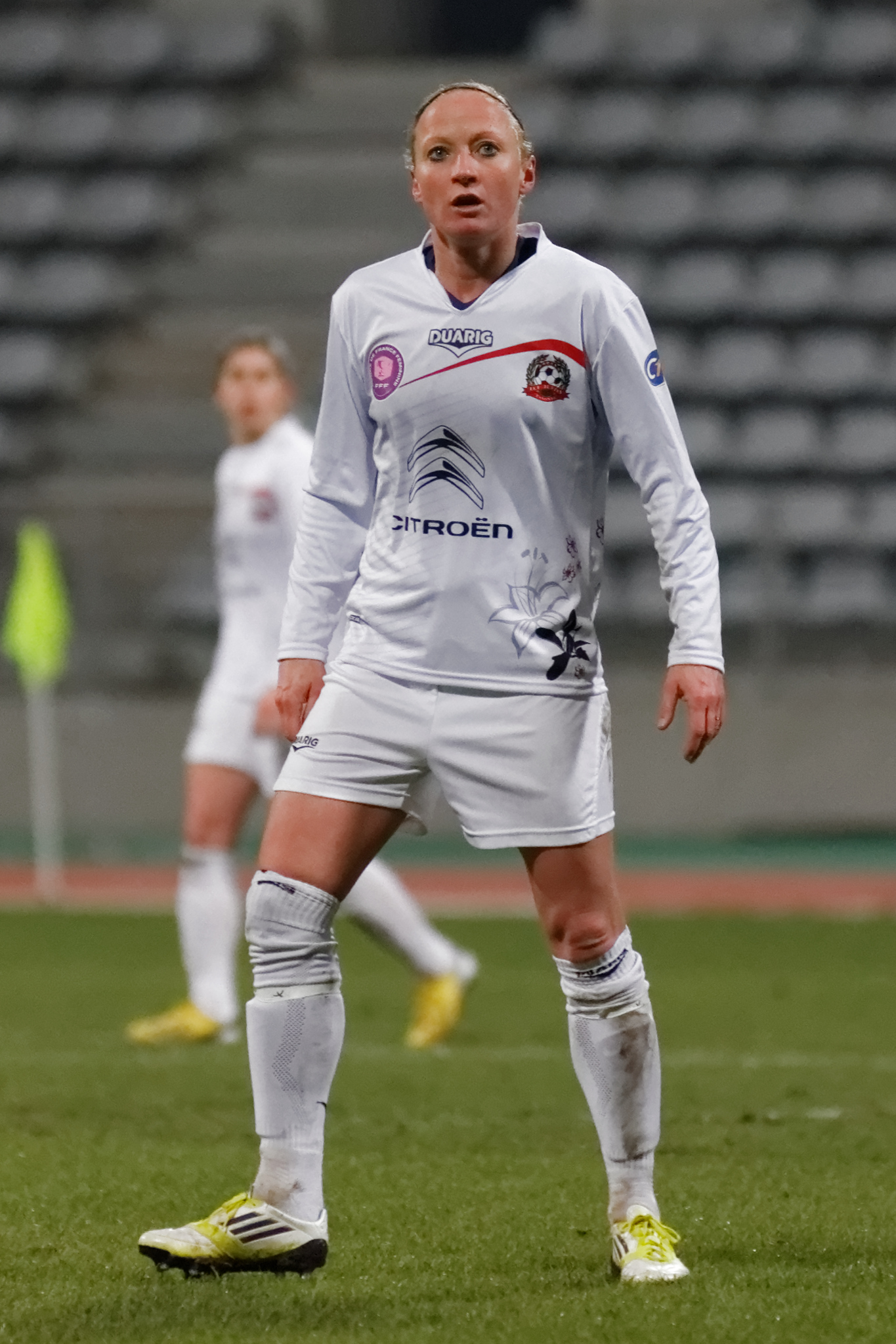
- Nelly Guilbert in 2013

Personal information
- Full name: Nelly Guilbert
- Date of birth: 12 September 1979 (age 47)
- Place of birth: Carpentras, France
- Height: 1.68 m (5 ft 6 in)
- Position: Defender

Youth career
- 1992–1997: FCF Monteux

Senior career*
Years	Team	Apps	(Gls)
1997–1998	Monteux	4	(0)
1998–2016	Juvisy	262	(34)

International career^{‡}
1997–1998	France U18	6	(0)
2001	France U21	1	(0)
1998–2005	France	9	(0)
- * Club domestic league appearances and goals as of 21 September 2016 (UTC) ‡ National team caps and goals as of 21 September 2016 (UTC)

Nelly Guilbert (born 12 September 1979) is a retired French footballer who spent the majority of her career at Juvisy of the Division 1 Féminine. She played as a defender winning three titles (league twice and cup once) and was also a French international having attained nine caps from 1998 to 2005.

== Club career ==
Early career

Born in Carpentras (a commune in the Vaucluse department), she began playing for nearby Football Club Féminin Monteux Vaucluse in the juniors and lower divisions from 1992 until making to the first team in 1997 and leaving the club in the following year.

Juvisy

Guilbert moved to FCF Juvisy ahead of the National 1A 1998–99 season. After the creation of the UEFA Women's Cup for clubs in 2001–02, France re-branded the National 1A to Division 1 Féminine (D1). Guilbert helped Juvisy win D1 inaugural season in 2002–03. In the next season she played three matches of the 2003–04 UEFA Women's Cup, scoring against Polish side AZS Wrocław.

Juvisy finished as D1 runners up in 2004–05 and won the French Cup, beating Olympique Lyonnais in the final. After a 1–1 draw, the match was decided on penalty shoot-out, with Guilbert converting Juvisy's sixth shot, on their 5–4 win.

She won the D1 for a second time in 2005–06 and played two matches in the 2006–07 UEFA Women's Cup. She reached the quarter-finals of the 2010–11 UEFA Women's Champions League and the semi-finals of the 2012–13 UEFA Women's Champions League.

After eighteen seasons playing for Juvisy, including over 300 matches played in all competitions, Guilbert and Amélie Coquet retired from football at the end of the 2015–16 season.

She is one of the longest-serving players at the club alongside Sandrine Soubeyrand.

== International career ==
Youth

On 4 October 1997, while still a FCF Monteux Vaucluse player, she was called up to international level for the first time by coach Bruno Bini to play with the under-18 team against Switzerland and became part of the 1998 UEFA Women's Under-18 Championship French runners up team. She played four matches in this tournament and six matches overall.

Despite having already played at senior level, on 10 April 2001, under coach Gérard Prêcheur she played one match for the under-21 team against Sweden.

Senior

Guilbert made her senior international debut on 15 February 1998 in a friendly match against England. She earned a total of nine caps from 1998 to 2005, all in friendly matches.

== Career statistics ==
=== Club ===
Statistics accurate as of 21 September 2016.

Club	Season	League		Cup		Continental		Total	
Club	Season	Apps	Goals	Apps	Goals	Apps	Goals	Apps	Goals
Monteux	1997–98	4	0	–	–	–	–	4	0
Monteux	Total	4	0	–	–	–	–	4	0
Juvisy	1998–99	6	0	–	–	–	–	6	0
Juvisy	1999–00	0	0	–	–	–	–	0	0
Juvisy	2000–01	2	0	–	–	–	–	2	0
Juvisy	2001–02	3	2	–	–	–	–	3	2
Juvisy	2002–03	5	0	–	–	–	–	5	0
Juvisy	2003–04	23	0	–	–	3	1	26	1
Juvisy	2004–05	22	0	1	0	–	–	23	0
Juvisy	2005–06	20	3	–	–	–	–	20	3
Juvisy	2006–07	12	0	–	–	2	0	14	0
Juvisy	2007–08	15	2	4	1	–	–	19	3
Juvisy	2008–09	20	2	4	3	–	–	24	5
Juvisy	2009–10	22	5	4	2	–	–	26	7
Juvisy	2010–11	22	2	4	0	8	0	34	2
Juvisy	2011–12	22	8	3	1	–	–	25	9
Juvisy	2012–13	20	4	3	1	7	0	30	5
Juvisy	2013–14	21	3	2	0	–	–	23	3
Juvisy	2014–15	16	3	4	0	–	–	20	3
Juvisy	2015–16	11	0	2	1	–	–	13	1
Juvisy	Total	262	34	31	9	20	1	313	44
Career total		266	34	31	9	20	1	317	44

=== International ===
(Correct as of 21 September 2016)

National team	Season	Apps	Goals
France	1997–98	1	0
France	1998–99	4	0
France	2000–01	1	0
France	2002–03	2	0
France	2004–05	1	0
Total		9	0

== Honours ==
=== Club ===
Juvisy

- Division 1 Féminine (2): 2002–03, 2005–06
- Coupe de France Féminine (1): 2005
