= Amélie Coquet =

French footballer (born 1984)

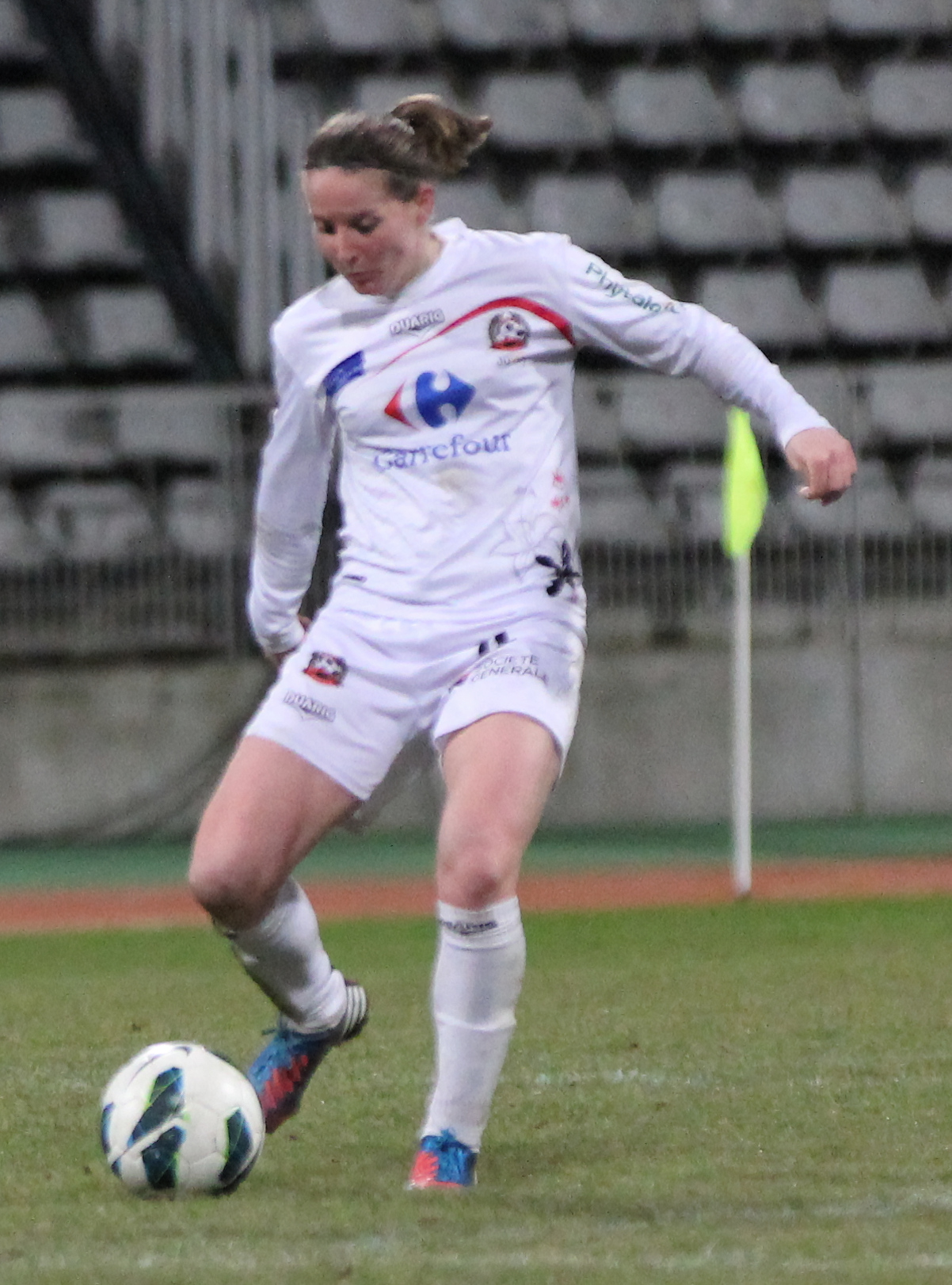
- Amélie Coquet during PSG-Juvisy, season 2012–2013

Personal information
- Full name: Amélie Coquet
- Date of birth: 31 December 1984 (age 41)
- Place of birth: Hazebrouck, France
- Height: 1.64 m (5 ft 5 in)
- Position: Midfielder

Youth career
- 1990–1998: US Coyecques
- 1998–1999: US Thérouanne
- 1999–2001: CA Éperlecques
- 2001–2002: Hénin-Beaumont

Senior career*
Years	Team	Apps	(Gls)
2001–2005	Hénin-Beaumont	44	(13)
2005–2016	FCF Juvisy	207	(48)
2017–2022	RC Lens	84	(10)

International career
2000–2001	France U-17	6	(0)
2001–2003	France U-19	20	(2)
2003–2010	France	17	(3)
- * Club domestic league appearances and goals as of 7 May 2021

Amélie Coquet (born 31 December 1984, in Hazebrouck) is a French football player who played for RC Lens Féminin. She spent the majority of her career at FCF Juvisy of the Division 1 Féminine. Coquet plays as a midfielder, and won the league with FCF Juvisy in 2005–06. She made seventeen appearances as a French international between 2003 and 2010.

== Personal life ==
Coquet was born on 31 December 1984 in the town of Hazebrouck (in Nord-Pas-de-Calais). In 2003, she was enrolled at the university of Liévin for studies in Sciences et techniques des activités physiques et sportives (STAP) (English: Science and Technology of Sport and Physical Activity).

She works as a firefighter in Essonne.

== Club career ==
=== Early career ===
Coquet began playing for U.S. Coyecquoise at the age of 5 under the guidance of her father and uncle. She remained at the club until June 1998, when a month later she joined U.S. Therouannaise where she played until June 1999. Cercle Athlétique d'Eperlecques was her next destination from July 1999 until October 2001 when she caught local attention and was called up for the Nord-Pas-de-Calais regional team. At this early stages of her career she played as a forward.

=== Hénin-Beaumont ===
Following a request from Clairefontaine to join a top-level club, Coquet arrives at FCF Hénin-Beaumont in November 2001. She became a midfielder and contributed to the club's 2002–03 France D2 title. She made her debut in the Division 1 Féminine (D1) at the 2003–04 season, finishing 7th in the league. That same position was also achieved in the following season.

=== Juvisy ===
Coquet signed with FCF Juvisy in July 2005 and won the D1 in her first season at the club (2005–06). In the following season she made her European debut at the 2006–07 UEFA Women's Cup, reaching the quarter-finals of the 2010–11 UEFA Women's Champions League and the semi-finals of the 2012–13 UEFA Women's Champions League.

After eleven seasons playing for Juvisy, including over 250 matches played in all competitions, Coquet and Nelly Guilbert retired from football at the end of the 2015–16 season.

=== FCF Arras ===
In December 2016, Coquet came out of retirement to play for Division 2 Féminine side Arras FCF (now Racing Club de Lens Féminin).

== International career ==
=== Youth ===
Early in her career while representing the Nord-Pas-de-Calais regional team, Coquet earned her first caps with the under-16 team. She then moved to the under-19 team, where notably between 2002 and 2003, she won the 2003 UEFA Women's Under-19 Championship, scoring twice in the tournament. She also played for the under-21 team.

=== Senior ===
She made her senior international debut on 8 September 2003 in a UEFA Women's Euro 2005 qualification match against Iceland and was named in the French squad for the 2003 FIFA Women's World Cup, where she played 13 minutes against Brazil. She also played matches at 2004 Algarve Cup, 2006 Algarve Cup, 2007 FIFA Women's World Cup qualification and friendly matches, earning a total of seventeen caps and scoring three goals from 2003 to 2010.

== Career statistics ==
=== Club ===
Statistics accurate as of 21 September 2016.

Club	Season	League		Cup		Continental		Total	
Club	Season	Apps	Goals	Apps	Goals	Apps	Goals	Apps	Goals
Hénin-Beaumont	2002–03	?	?	–	–	–	–	?	?
Hénin-Beaumont	2003–04	22	5	–	–	–	–	22	5
Hénin-Beaumont	2004–05	22	8	–	–	–	–	22	8
Hénin-Beaumont	Total	44	13	–	–	–	–	44	13
Juvisy	2005–06	20	2	–	–	–	–	20	2
Juvisy	2006–07	7	1	–	–	3	0	10	1
Juvisy	2007–08	22	12	4	0	–	–	26	12
Juvisy	2008–09	19	2	–	–	–	–	19	2
Juvisy	2009–10	20	5	4	0	–	–	24	5
Juvisy	2010–11	21	11	4	3	9	3	34	17
Juvisy	2011–12	22	7	3	0	–	–	25	7
Juvisy	2012–13	20	2	3	1	8	0	31	3
Juvisy	2013–14	21	2	2	0	–	–	23	2
Juvisy	2014–15	20	2	4	2	–	–	24	4
Juvisy	2015–16	15	2	3	1	–	–	18	3
Juvisy	Total	207	48	27	7	20	3	254	58
Career total		251	61	27	7	20	3	298	71

=== International ===
(Correct as of 1 September 2016)

National team	Season	Apps	Goals
France	2003–04	7	1
France	2004–05	3	0
France	2005–06	4	1
France	2007–08	1	1
France	2009–10	2	0
Total		17	3

==== International goals ====
#	Date	Venue	Opponent	Score	Result	Competition
1	20 March 2004	Estádio de São Luís, Faro, Portugal	Italy	2–3	3–3	2004 Algarve Cup
2	9 March 2006	Estádio de São Luís, Faro, Portugal	Denmark	0–1	2–2	2006 Algarve Cup
3	8 March 2008	Stade Mohamed V, Casablanca, Morocco	Morocco	0–1	0–6	Friendly
Correct as of 1 September 2016

== Honours ==
=== Club ===
Juvisy

- Division 1 Féminine (1): 2005–06

=== International ===
France U-19

- UEFA Women's Under-19 Championship (1): 2003
