= Peggy Provost =

French footballer (born 1977)

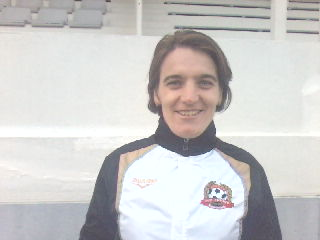

Personal information
- Full name: Peggy Provost
- Date of birth: 19 September 1977 (age 49)
- Place of birth: Bourg-en-Bresse, France
- Height: 1.66 m (5 ft 5 in)
- Position: Midfielder

Senior career*
Years	Team	Apps	(Gls)
1992–1993	Flacé Mâcon		
1993–1996	Caluire		
1996–1997	Juvisy		
1997–1999	Ulis		
1999–2009	Juvisy		

International career
1998–2006	France	92	(2)
- * Club domestic league appearances and goals

Peggy Provost (born 19 September 1977) is a French former football midfielder. She played for FCF Juvisy in the French First Division.

She was a member of the France national team for eight years, taking part in the 2003 World Cup and 2005 European Championship.

== Titles ==
- 3 French Leagues (1997, 2003, 2006)
- 1 French Cup (2005)
