= FCF Hénin-Beaumont =

- Full name: Football Club Féminin Hénin-Beaumont
- Founded: 1972
- Ground: Stade Octave Birembaut, Hénin-Beaumont
- Capacity: 3,000
- President: Michel Houvenaeghel
- Manager: Philippe Piette
- League: D1 Féminine
- 2009–10: 7th, D1 Féminine
Home colours	Away colours

Football Club Féminin Hénin-Beaumont is a French women's football club based in Hénin-Beaumont.

== History ==
The club was founded on 12 May 1972 and currently play in the Féminine Régional 1, having previously played in the Féminine Division 1 after finishing 7th in the 2009–10 season. In 2010, Hénin-Beaumont moved to the Stade Octave Birembaut, 3,000 capacity stadium in the commune, where the club play its home matches. Previously, the club played its matches at the Stade Raymonde Delabre.

Hénin-Beaumont is managed by Philippe Piette, a former football player, who had a professional career from 1973 to 1990. Piette had notable club stints at Valenciennes, Metz, and Nancy. Hénin-Beaumont is captained by former French youth international defender Gwendoline Rossi. Rossi has played at senior level for the club since she was 16 years old.

== Players ==
=== Current squad ===
Updated 26 November 2009.

Note: Flags indicate national team as defined under FIFA eligibility rules; some limited exceptions apply. Players may hold more than one non-FIFA nationality.

No.	Pos.	Nation	Player
1	GK	FRA	Marion Mancion
2	DF	FRA	Laurine Chemery
3	DF	CMR	Rigoberte M'Bah
4	DF	FRA	Gwendoline Rossi
5	DF	FRA	Laurie Dacquigny
6	MF	FRA	Julie Debever
7	FW	FRA	Aurélie Desmaretz
8	MF	FRA	Marie Schepers
10	MF	FRA	Rachel Saïdi

No.	Pos.	Nation	Player
11	MF	FRA	Nasha Amrane
12	DF	FRA	Marie-Hélène Olivier
13	MF	FRA	Mélodie Hurez
14	FW	FRA	Camille Lewandoski
15	MF	FRA	Charlotte Blanchard
—	MF	FRA	Pauline Martin
18	DF	FRA	Hélène Delebarre
—	MF	GER	Selina Klemm

=== Former notable players ===
- Sandrine Capy
- Amélie Coquet
- Pauline Crammer
- Severine Goulois
- Amandine Henry
- Candie Herbert
- Julie Soyer

== Honours ==
=== Official ===
- Division 2 Féminine:
  - Winners (2): 2002–03, 2012–13

=== Invitational ===
- Menton Tournament:
  - Winners (1): 2002
