= Julie Soyer =

French footballer (born 1985)

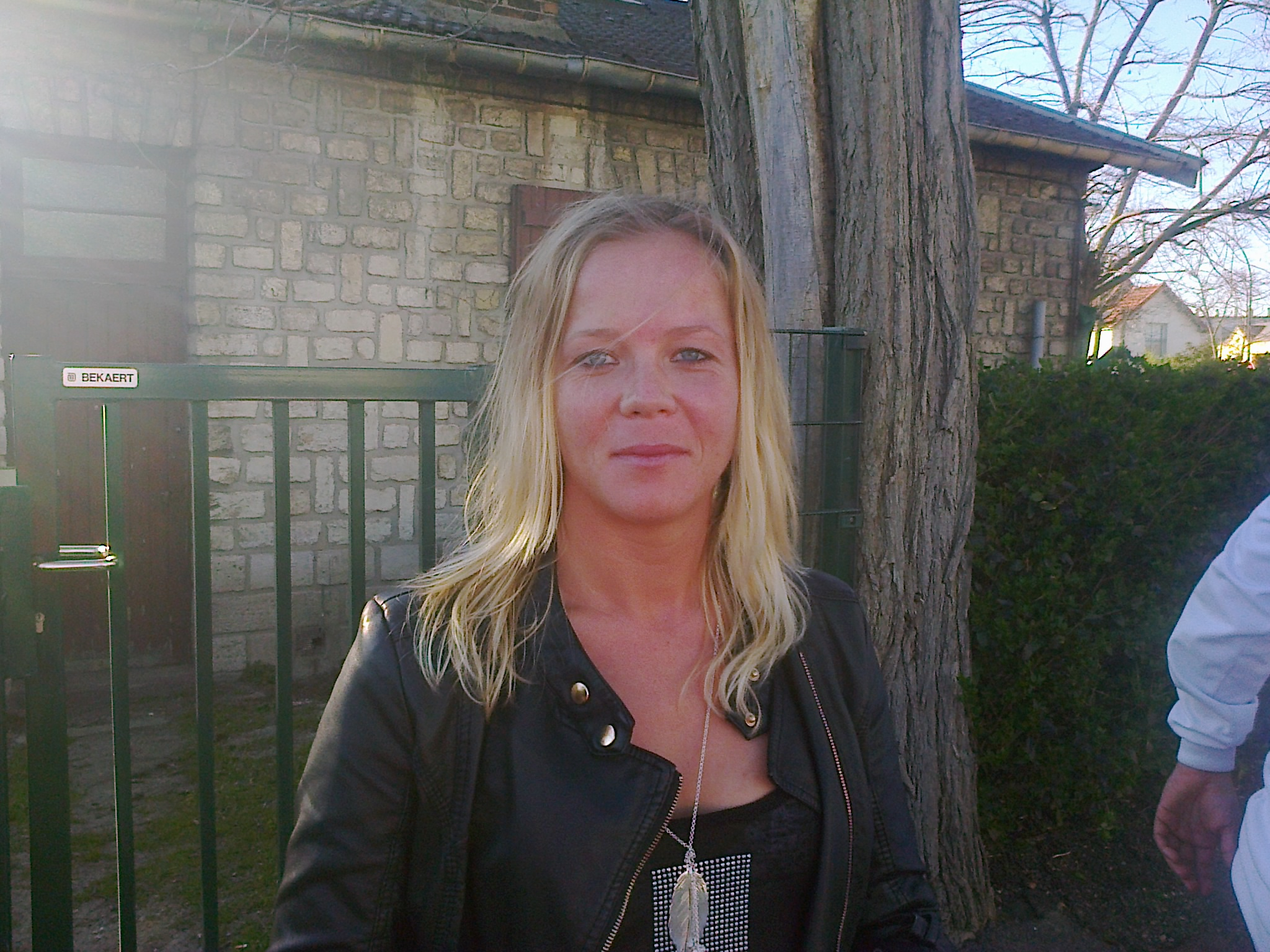
- Soyer in 2014

Personal information
- Date of birth: 30 June 1985 (age 41)
- Place of birth: Évreux, France
- Height: 1.66 m (5 ft 5 1/2 in)
- Position: Defender

Youth career
- 1995–1999: Saint-Didier-des-Bois
- 1999–2000: Entente Saint-Pierraise
- 2000–2001: Mesnil-Esnard Franqueville
- 2001–2002: Évreux

Senior career*
Years	Team	Apps	(Gls)
2002–2004	CNFE Clairefontaine	38	(3)
2004–2005	Hénin-Beaumont	21	(0)
2005–2009	Montpellier	68	(2)
2009–2012	Paris Saint-Germain	60	(2)
2012–2024	Paris FC (Note: Known as Juvisy till July 2017.)	221	(6)
Total		408	(13)

International career
2002	France U17	4	(0)
2003–2004	France U19	14	(0)
2005–2007	France U21	5	(0)
2012–2015	France B	6	(0)
2012–2016	France	10	(0)
- * Club domestic league appearances and goals

Julie Soyer (born 30 June 1985) is a French former footballer who played as a defender.

== Club career ==
She played for Évreux FC, CNFE Clairefontaine, FCF Hénin-Beaumont, Montpellier HSC and Paris Saint-Germain F.C. before joining FCF Juvisy.

== International career ==
Soyer was called up to be part of the national team for the UEFA Women's Euro 2013.

== Career statistics ==
=== International ===
As of match played 16 September 2016

Appearances and goals by national team and year
National team	Year	Apps	Goals
France	2012	4	0
France	2013	2	0
France	2014	2	0
France	2015	1	0
France	2016	1	0
Total		10	0
