= Théa Gréboval =

French footballer (born 1997)

Personal information
- Date of birth: 5 April 1997 (age 29)
- Place of birth: Dieppe, France
- Height: 1.68 m (5 ft 6 in)
- Position: Full back

Team information
- Current team: Paris FC
- Number: 19

Youth career
- 2003–2011: FC Offranvillais
- 2011: FC Dieppe
- 2012: FC Offranvillais
- 2012–2014: Hénin-Beaumont
- 2014–2016: Juvisy

Senior career*
Years	Team	Apps	(Gls)
2013–2014	Hénin-Beaumont	25	(1)
2014–	Paris FC (Note: Known as Juvisy till July 2017.)	191	(12)

International career
2013	France U16	2	(0)
2015–2016	France U19	25	(1)
2016	France U20	6	(0)
2017–2018	France U23	10	(1)
2017	France	1	(0)
Medal record
Women's football
Representing France
UEFA Women's Under-19 Championship
Winner	2016 Slovakia
- * Club domestic league appearances and goals as of 6 May 2026

Théa Gréboval (born 5 April 1997) is a French professional footballer who plays as a full back for Première Ligue club Paris FC. She has been a member of the France national team.

== Club career ==
As a youth, Gréboval evolved her play at FC Offranville and with a brief stint at FC Dieppe. In 2012, she joined FCF Hénin-Beaumont then in the second division; She made her debut in the first division during the 2013-2014 season. She became an FCF Juvisy player in July 2014.

== International career ==
Gréboval earned two caps with the France under-17 team between 2013 and 2014, ten caps for the France under-19 team in 2016, and six caps for the France under-20 team in 2016. With the under-19 national team, she won the 2016 European Under-19 Championship, and reached the final of the 2016 Under-20 World Cup. She had her first selection for the France team on September 15, 2017 in a friendly against Chile.

== Honours ==
Paris FC

- Coupe de France Féminine: 2024–25

France U19

- UEFA Women's Under-19 Championship: 2016

Individual

- UEFA Women's Under-19 Championship team of the tournament: 2015, 2016
