= Sandrine Capy =

French footballer (born 1969)

Personal information
- Date of birth: 19 January 1969 (age 57)
- Place of birth: Lille, France
- Height: 1.69 m (5 ft 7 in)
- Position: Goalkeeper

Senior career*
Years	Team	Apps	(Gls)
1986–1993	FCF Hénin-Beaumont		
1993–2007	Juvisy		

International career
1997–2005	France	16	(0)
- * Club domestic league appearances and goals

Sandrine Capy (born 19 January 1969) is a French football player who played as goalkeeper for French club Juvisy of the Division 1 Féminine. Capy won 5 Division 1 Féminine titles.

== International career ==
Capy was also part of the French team at the 2005 European Championships.

== Honours ==
=== Official ===
- Division 1 Féminine (Champions of France) (level 1)

Winners (4): 1994–95, 1995–96, 1996–97, 2002–03
