= Hawa Sangaré =

French footballer (born 2002)

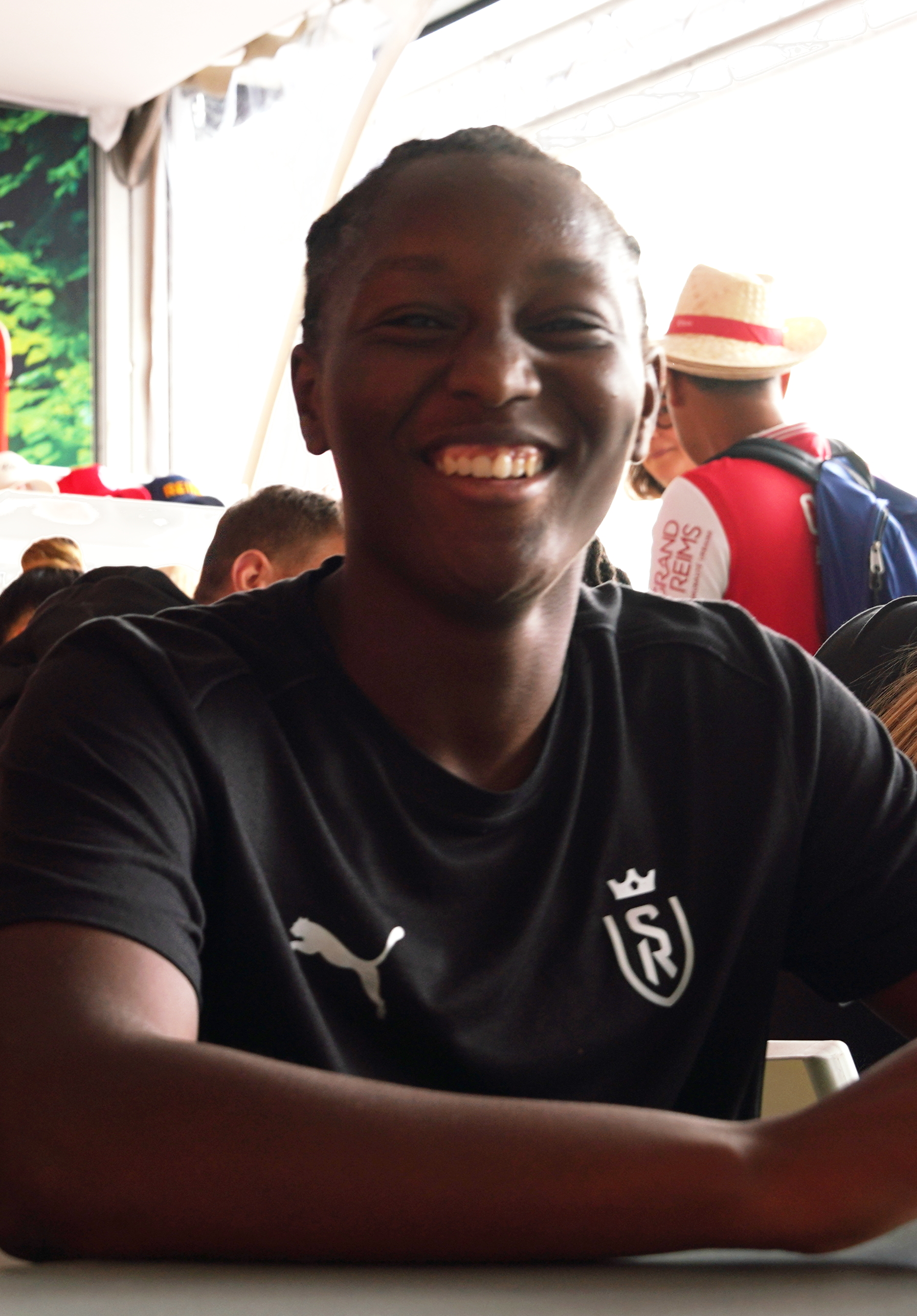
- Sangaré in 2024

Personal information
- Full name: Hawa Sangaré
- Date of birth: 20 July 2002 (age 24)
- Place of birth: Villepinte, France
- Height: 1.72 m (5 ft 8 in)
- Position: Forward

Team information
- Current team: Paris FC
- Number: 15

Youth career
- 2010–2011: Espérance Aulnaysienne
- 2012–2015: AS Saint-Mard
- 2015–2020: Paris Saint-Germain

Senior career*
Years	Team	Apps	(Gls)
2020–2023	Paris Saint-Germain	0	(0)
2021	→ Le Havre (loan)	9	(0)
2022	→ Dijon (loan)	11	(0)
2022–2023	→ Pomigliano (loan)	11	(0)
2023–2024	Bordeaux	18	(5)
2024–2025	Reims	22	(4)
2025–	Paris FC	14	(1)

International career^{‡}
2019	France U17	5	(1)
2019	France U19	2	(0)
2022	France U20	6	(0)
2025–	France U23	6	(0)
- * Club domestic league appearances and goals as of 22 November 2026 ‡ National team caps and goals as of 1 December 2025

Hawa Sangaré (born 20 July 2002) is a French professional footballer who plays as a forward for Première Ligue club Paris FC.

== Club career ==
A youth academy graduate of Paris Saint-Germain, Sangaré signed her first professional contract with the club on 30 January 2021 and joined Le Havre on loan until the end of the season.

On 11 January 2022, Dijon announced the signing of Sangaré on loan deal for the remainder of the season. In September 2022, she joined Italian Serie A club Pomigliano on loan for 2022–2023 season.

On 13 June 2025, Sangaré joined Paris FC on a three-year contract.

== Honours ==
Individual

- Titi d'Or: 2020
