= Aline Riera =

French footballer (born 1972)

Personal information
- Full name: Aline Riera Ubiergo
- Date of birth: 21 January 1972 (age 54)
- Place of birth: Vélizy-Villacoublay, France
- Position: Defender

Senior career*
Years	Team	Apps	(Gls)
1986–1994	FCF Juvisy		
1994–1999	Saint-Brieuc		
1999–2005	FCF Juvisy		
2008–2010	FCF Juvisy		

International career
1993–2002	France	60	(0)
- * Club domestic league appearances and goals

Aline Riera Ubiergo (born 21 January 1972) is a French footballer who played as a defender for the French women's national football team. She was part of the team at the UEFA Women's Euro 2001. On club level she played for FCF Juvisy in France.
