= Manuela Nicolosi =

Association football referee (born 1980)

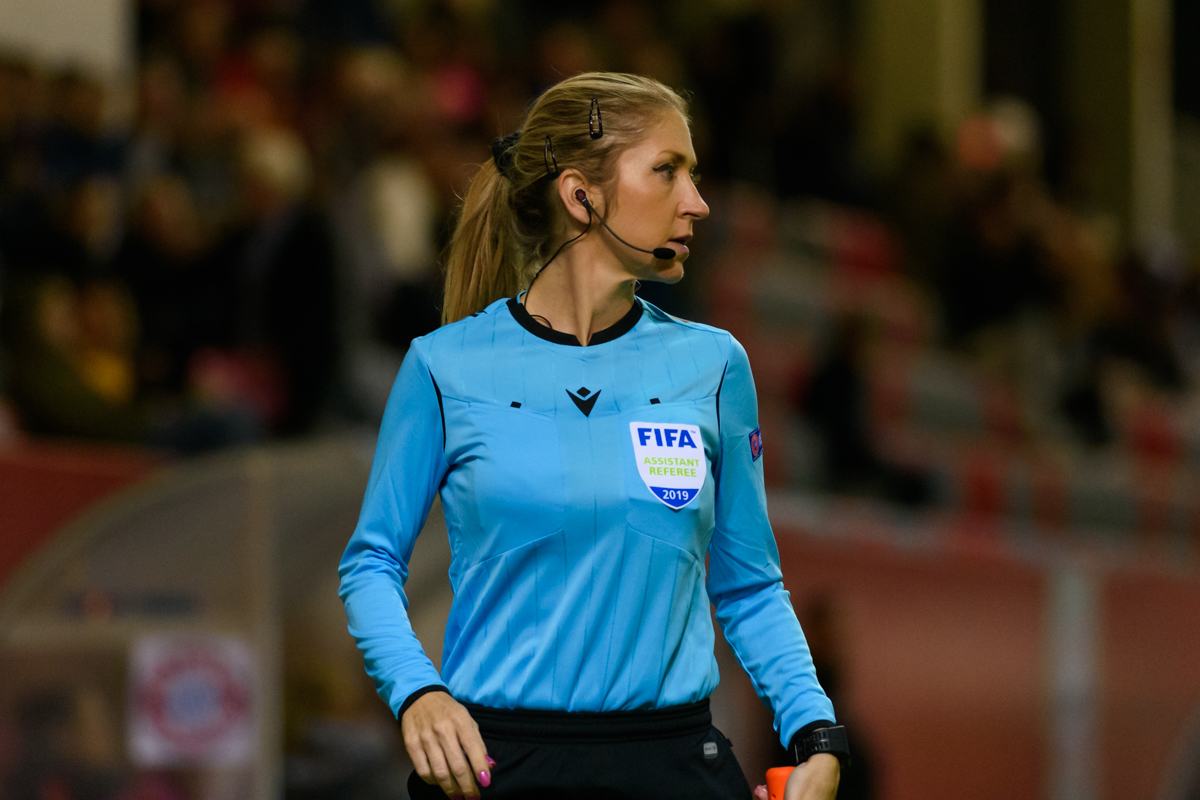
- Nicolosi in 2019
- Born: 18 January 1980 (age 46)

International
Years	League	Role

Manuela Nicolosi (born 18 January 1980) is a football match official.

== Career ==
She started refereeing at age 15 after girls were allowed to officiate in Italy. She became Ligue 1 and international referee in 2010.

She was an assistant referee at among others 2015 FIFA Women's World Cup, 2016 Summer Olympics, UEFA Women's Euro 2017, 2019 FIFA Women's World Cup, 2019 UEFA Super Cup 2020 Summer Olympics and UEFA Women's Euro 2022, 2023 Women's Finalissima.

== Personal life ==
Nicolosi grew up in Rome, Italy and moved in around 2004 to France where she lives in Lyon with her daughter. Upon relocating to France, she had to learn the language and pass a test. She got into football at the age of four and revealed that she had wanted to become a footballer, but his father turned down.
