= Teninsoun Sissoko =

French-Malian footballer (born 1992)

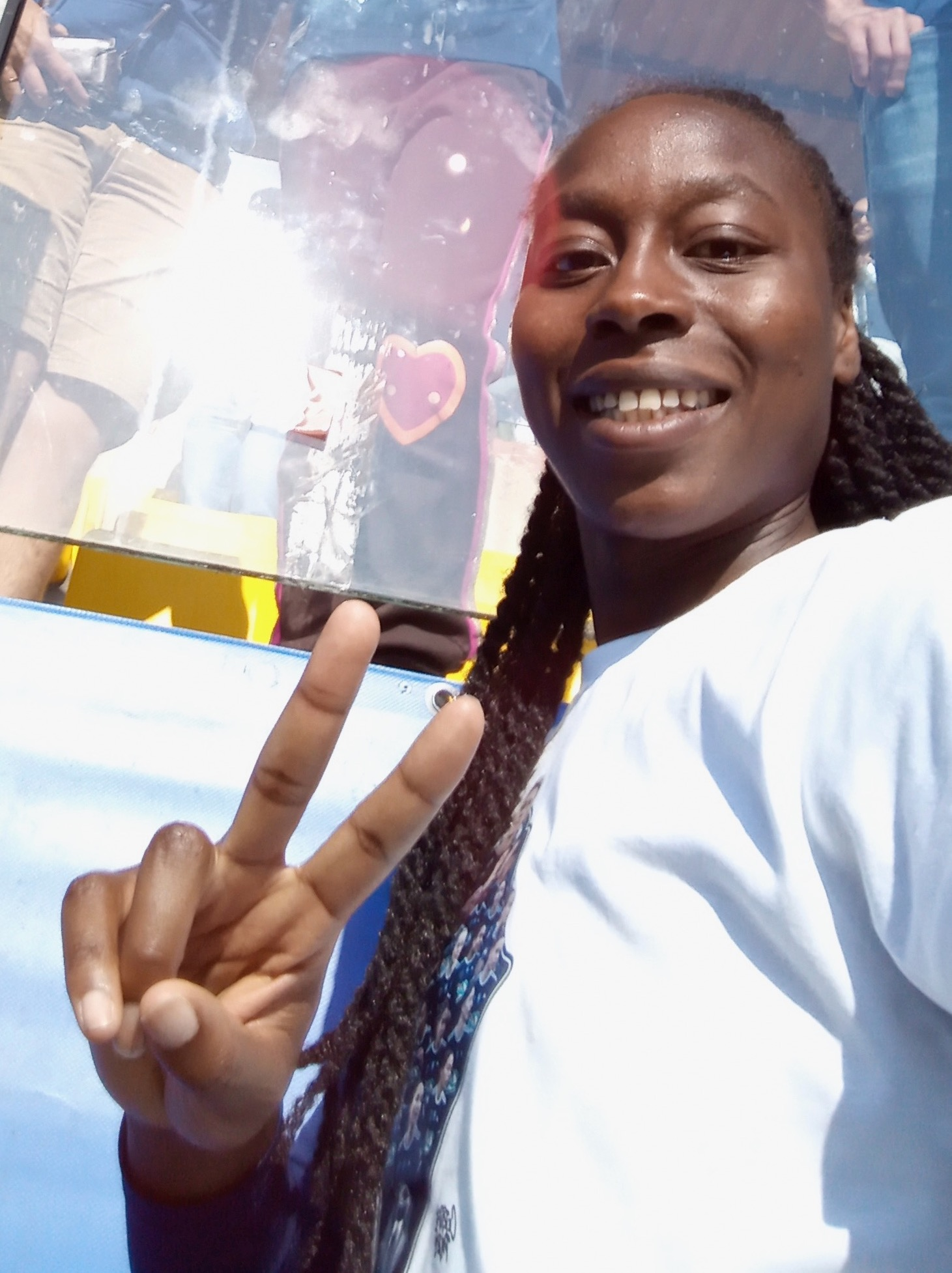
- Sissoko in 2025

Personal information
- Full name: Teninsoun Liliane Sissoko
- Date of birth: 2 September 1992 (age 34)
- Place of birth: Saint-Denis, France
- Height: 1.73 m (5 ft 8 in)
- Position: Centre-back

Youth career
- 2004–2005: Aubervilliers
- 2005–2006: Paris Saint-Germain
- 2006–2008: Le Mans

Senior career*
Years	Team	Apps	(Gls)
2008–2012	Le Mans	66	(2)
2012–2017	Saint-Étienne	41	(0)
2017–2021	FC Fleury 91	69	(0)
2021–2023	Turbine Potsdam	28	(1)
2023–2026	Paris FC	41	(0)

International career^{‡}
2015–2017	France B	2	(0)
2024–	Mali	4	(0)
- * Club domestic league appearances and goals as of 05:21, 13 June 2026 (UTC) ‡ National team caps and goals as of 25 February 2025

Teninsoun Liliane Sissoko (born 2 September 1992) is a professional footballer who plays as a centre-back. Born in France, she plays for the Mali national team.

== Club career ==
Sissoko grew up in the Maladrerie district of Aubervilliers. She began playing football at a young age but did not join her first club, FCM Aubervilliers, until the age of 12. She spent a year with Paris Saint-Germain before finding herself without a club. At 14, she entered a sports-study program in Le Mans, where she joined Le Mans FC. Over five seasons with the club, she experienced both promotion to Division 1 and subsequent relegation, as well as reaching the Coupe de France final in 2009. At just 18 years old, she was named team captain.

In 2012, Sissoko signed with Saint-Étienne, where she played for five seasons while pursuing her academic studies. During her time with the club, she signed her first professional contract. Following Saint-Étienne's relegation to Division 2 in 2017, she joined FC Fleury 91.

In 2021, Sissoko opted to leave the French league. After being in contact with several foreign clubs, including AC Milan, she signed with Turbine Potsdam in the German Bundesliga. She helped the team reach the DFB-Pokal Frauen final in 2022.

Following Turbine Potsdam's relegation, Sissoko—who had served as club captain—returned to France and joined Paris FC, where she made her UEFA Women's Champions League debut. During the qualifying round against Arsenal, Paris FC went on to eliminate the English side in a penalty shootout following a 3–3 draw. Sissoko went on to make 66 appearances for Paris FC across all competitions before departing from the club in June 2026.

== International career ==
Born in France, Sissoko represented her birth country's B team between 2015 and 2017, appearing in two friendly matches. She later switched her international allegiance to Mali and received her first call-up to the Malian national team in December 2024 for friendly matches against Botswana and Morocco.

== Honours ==
Paris FC

- Coupe de France Féminine: 2024–25
