= Margaux Le Mouël =

French footballer (born 2001)

Personal information
- Full name: Margaux Le Mouël
- Date of birth: 8 August 2001 (age 25)
- Place of birth: Pontivy, France
- Height: 1.69 m (5 ft 7 in)
- Position: Midfielder

Team information
- Current team: Lazio
- Number: 15

Youth career
- 2007–2016: Loudéac OSC
- 2016–2019: Guingamp

Senior career*
Years	Team	Apps	(Gls)
2019–2022	Guingamp	60	(3)
2022–2025	Paris FC	55	(2)
2025–2026	Marseille	21	(4)
2026–	Lazio	7	(0)

International career^{‡}
2017	France U16	7	(0)
2017	France U17	3	(1)
2018–2020	France U19	20	(2)
2019	France U20	2	(0)
2021–2025	France U23	15	(0)
2024–	France	2	(0)
Medal record
Representing France
Women's football
UEFA Women's Under-19 Championship
Winner	2019 Scotland
- * Club domestic league appearances and goals as of 14 November 2026 ‡ National team caps and goals as of 25 February 2025

Margaux Le Mouël (born 8 August 2001) is a French professional footballer who plays as a midfielder for Serie A Women club Lazio and the France national team.

== Club career ==
A native of Loudéac, Le Mouël began playing youth football with local side Loudéac OSC. A youth academy graduate of Guingamp, and after suffering a serious knee injury in late 2017, Le Mouël made her professional debut on 4 May 2019, coming on as a substitute for Ekaterina Tyryshkina in a 1–1 draw against Paris Saint-Germain. She scored her first league goal against Montpellier on 15 January 2021.

On 30 June 2022, Le Mouël joined Paris FC on a three-year deal. She made her league debut against Rodez on 10 September 2022. She scored her first league goal against Dijon on 22 October 2023, scoring in the 54th minute.

On 5 July 2025, Le Mouël joined Marseille. On 13 July 2026, she joined Italian club Lazio.

== International career ==
Le Mouël has represented France at various youth levels. She was part of the France under-19 squad which won the 2019 UEFA Women's Under-19 Championship.

In October 2024, Le Mouël was called up to the senior France squad for the first time for friendlies against Jamaica and Switzerland. She made her international debut against Jamaica on 25 October 2024.

== Career statistics ==
=== Club ===
As of match played 11 May 2025

Appearances and goals by club, season and competition
Club	Season	League			National cup		Continental		Other		Total	
Club	Season	Division	Apps	Goals	Apps	Goals	Apps	Goals	Apps	Goals	Apps	Goals
Guingamp	2018–19	Première Ligue	1	0	0	0	—		—		1	0
Guingamp	2019–20	Première Ligue	16	0	4	0	—		—		20	0
Guingamp	2020–21	Première Ligue	21	1	1	0	—		—		22	1
Guingamp	2021–22	Première Ligue	22	2	1	0	—		—		23	2
Guingamp	Total		60	3	6	0	0	0	0	0	66	3
Paris FC	2022–23	Première Ligue	15	0	0	0	2 (Note: Appearances in UEFA Women's Champions League)	0	—		17	0
Paris FC	2023–24	Première Ligue	19	2	3	0	10	0	2 (Note: Appearance(s) in playoffs)	0	34	2
Paris FC	2024–25	Première Ligue	21	0	5	1	4	0	1	0	31	1
Paris FC	Total		55	2	8	1	16	0	3	0	82	3
Career total			115	5	14	1	16	0	3	0	148	6

=== International ===
As of match played 29 October 2024

Appearances and goals by national team and year
National team	Year	Apps	Goals
France	2024	2	0
Total		2	0

== Honours ==
Paris FC

- Coupe de France Féminine: 2024–25

France U19

- UEFA Women's Under-19 Championship: 2019
