= Jade Le Guilly =

French footballer (born 2002)

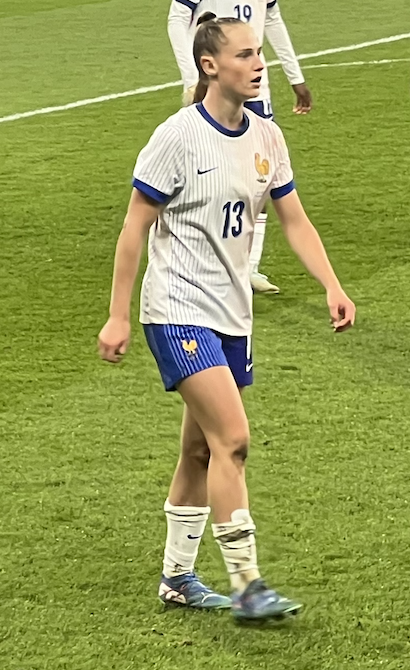
- Le Guilly with France in 2024

Personal information
- Date of birth: 18 June 2002 (age 24)
- Place of birth: Nogent-sur-Marne, France
- Height: 1.70 m (5 ft 7 in)
- Positions: Right-back; left-back

Team information
- Current team: Paris Saint-Germain
- Number: 28

Youth career
- 2010–2012: Marines Vexin
- 2012–2014: AS du Vexin
- 2014–2020: Paris Saint-Germain

Senior career*
Years	Team	Apps	(Gls)
2020–	Paris Saint-Germain	53	(3)
2022–2023	→ Real Sociedad (loan)	22	(1)

International career^{‡}
2019	France U17	4	(0)
2019–2020	France U19	6	(0)
2021–2022	France U20	12	(0)
2022–	France U23	11	(0)
2024–	France	2	(0)
- * Club domestic league appearances and goals as of 14 November 2026 ‡ National team caps and goals as of 8 October 2026

Jade Le Guilly (born 18 June 2002) is a French professional footballer who plays as a right-back or left-back for Première Ligue club Paris Saint-Germain and the France national team.

== Club career ==
=== Paris Saint-Germain ===
Born in Nogent-sur-Marne, Jade Le Guilly started playing football at age eight at AS Vexin Marines, in Val d'Oise. She is a youth academy graduate of Paris Saint-Germain. She joined the club in 2014 at the age of 12.

Le Guilly made her professional debut for the club on 10 December 2020 in a 2–0 Champions League win against Górnik Łęczna, substituting for Ashley Lawrence in the 57th minute. On 8 February 2021, she signed her first professional contract with the club until June 2024. Le Guilly made her league debut against Le Havre on 9 May 2021. Her team was crowned champion of France for the 2020–21 season.

On 19 February 2024, Le Guilly signed a contract extension with Paris Saint-Germain until June 2027. She scored her first league goal against Le Havre on 2 March 2024, scoring in the 44th minute.

=== Loan to Real Sociedad ===
On 6 September 2022, Le Guilly joined Spanish club Real Sociedad on a season long loan deal. She made her league debut against Villarreal on 17 September 2022. Le Guilly scored her first league goal against Barcelona on 3 December 2022, scoring in the 44th minute.

== International career ==
Le Guilly has represented France at various youth levels. She was a member of French squad at the 2022 FIFA U-20 World Cup where she featured in four games.

On 9 April 2023, Le Guilly received her first call-up to the France national team for a friendly match against Canada. She made her senior team debut on 29 October 2024 in a 2–1 defeat to Switzerland.

== Personal life ==
Le Guilly is the older sister of Eden Le Guilly, who is also a professional footballer.

== Career statistics ==
=== Club ===
As of match played 18 November 2026

Appearances and goals by club, season and competition
Club	Season	League			National cup (Note: Includes Coupe de France Féminine, Copa de la Reina)		League cup		Continental		Other		Total	
Club	Season	Division	Apps	Goals	Apps	Goals	Apps	Goals	Apps	Goals	Apps	Goals	Apps	Goals
Paris Saint-Germain	2020–21	Première Ligue	1	0	0	0	—		3 (Note: Appearances in UEFA Women's Champions League)	0	—		4	0
Paris Saint-Germain	2021–22	Première Ligue	6	0	0	0	—		2	0	—		8	0
Paris Saint-Germain	2022–23	Première Ligue	0	0	0	0	—		0	0	0	0	0	0
Paris Saint-Germain	2023–24	Première Ligue	17	3	5	0	—		12	0	3 (Note: Two appearances in playoffs, one appearance in Trophée des Championnes)	0	37	3
Paris Saint-Germain	2024–25	Première Ligue	20	0	5	0	—		2	0	1 (Note: Appearance in playoffs)	0	28	0
Paris Saint-Germain	2025–26	Première Ligue	1	0	1	0	0	0	0	0	0	0	2	0
Paris Saint-Germain	2026–27	Première Ligue	8	0	0	0	0	0	6	0	—		14	0
Paris Saint-Germain	Total		53	3	11	0	0	0	25	0	4	0	93	3
Real Sociedad (loan)	2022–23	Liga F	22	1	1	0	—		1	0	2 (Note: Appearances in Supercopa de España Femenina)	0	26	1
Career total			75	4	12	0	0	0	26	0	6	0	119	4

=== International ===
As of match played 30 November 2024

Appearances and goals by national team and year
National team	Year	Apps	Goals
France	2024	2	0
Total		2	0

== Honours ==
Paris Saint-Germain

- Division 1 Féminine: 2020–21
- Coupe de France: 2023–24
