= Sandrine Soubeyrand =

French footballer (born 1973)

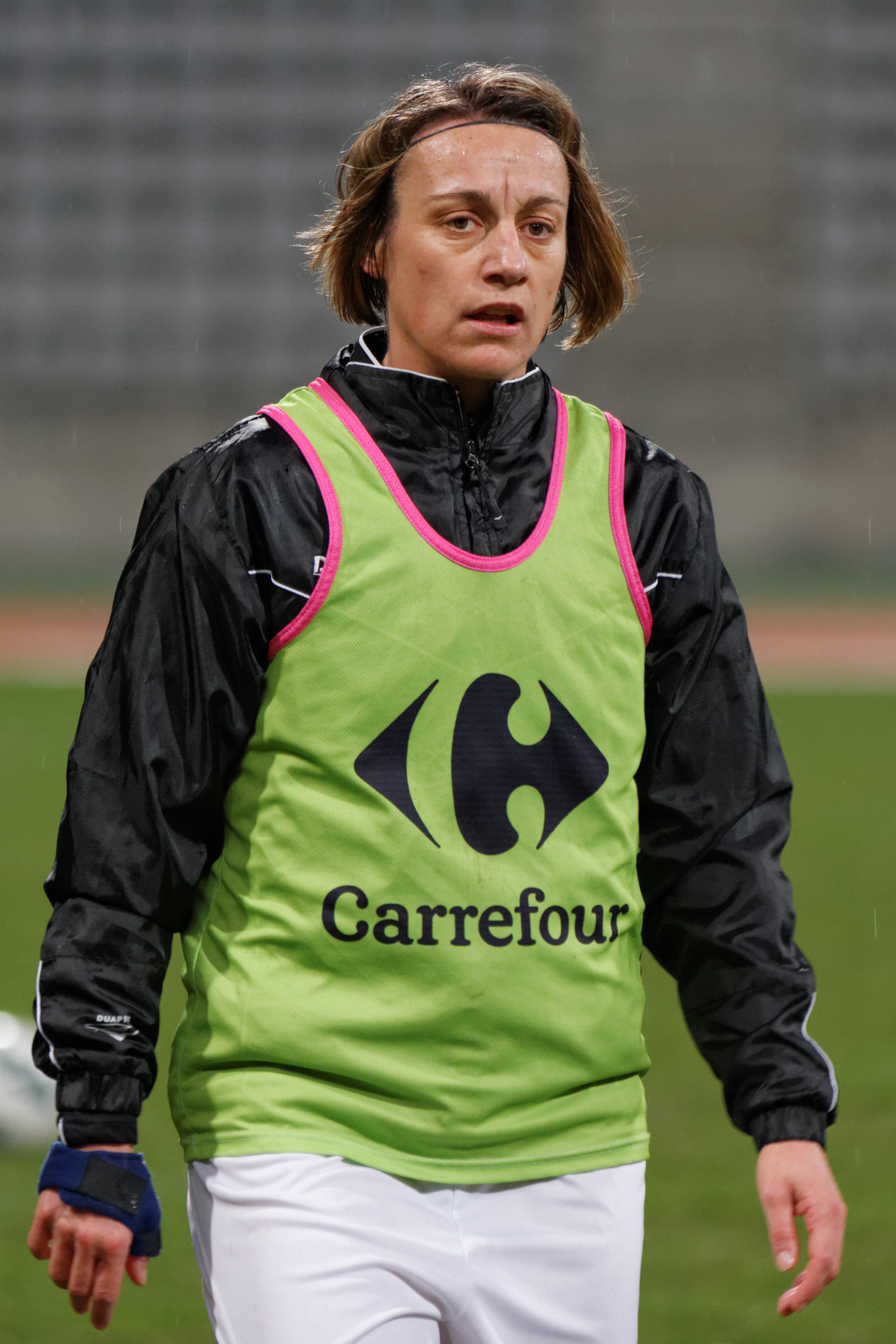
- Soubeyrand warming up for Juvisy in 2013

Personal information
- Full name: Sandrine Soubeyrand
- Date of birth: 16 August 1973 (age 53)
- Place of birth: Saint-Agrève, France
- Height: 1.73 m (5 ft 8 in)
- Position: Midfielder

Youth career
- 1980–1987: Boulieu-lès-Annonay
- 1987–1990: FC Félines Saint-Cyr

Senior career*
Years	Team	Apps	(Gls)
1990–1994	FC Félines Saint-Cyr		
1994–2000	Caluire SC		
2000–2014	Juvisy	242	(37)

International career^{‡}
1997–2013	France	198	(17)

Managerial career
- 2014–2018: France women U17
- 2018–: Paris FC (women)
- * Club domestic league appearances and goals as of 25 September 2016 (UTC) ‡ National team caps and goals as of 25 September 2016 (UTC)

Sandrine Soubeyrand (born 16 August 1973) is a French former footballer and current coach of Paris FC (women). She played as a midfielder for France national team, Félines Saint-Cyr, Caluire and Juvisy.

At club level, Soubeyrand won two Division 1 Féminine titles and a Coupe de France Féminine with Juvisy and received the UNFP Female Player of the Year in 2003. At international level with France, she played in two FIFA Women's World Cup, five UEFA Women's Championship and one Olympic Games.

Soubeyrand is the nation's most capped football player (male or female) in history with 198 appearances and a recipient of the National Order of Merit.

== Personal life ==
Soubeyrand studied at INSEP to become a sports educator and is a school director for extracurricular activities in Juvisy-sur-Orge (Essonne). In December 2012, she was nominated Knight of the National Order of Merit for her services to French football, Valérie Fourneyron (France Minister of Sports) presented her with the insignia on 5 February 2013 in Évry.

== Club career ==
=== Early career ===
Soubeyrand began playing at the age of 6 for local club Boulieu-lès-Annonay in the département of Ardèche. At the age of 13, she joined FC Félines Saint-Cyr in Saint-Cyr where she spent seven years.

=== Caluire ===
In August 1994, she arrived in Caluire-et-Cuire (Greater Lyon) to play for Caluire Saint-Clair SC of the National 1B (second division). In her first season (1994–95), the club won the National 1B title and was promoted to the National 1A for the 1995–96 season. She remained with the club in the National 1A for the following seasons until the club's relegation at the conclusion of the 1999–00 season.

=== Juvisy ===
Ahead of the 2000–01 season, she joined National 1A club FCF Juvisy in the département of Essonne (Parisian Region). She helped the club finish the 1A in third (2000–01) and runners up (2001–02). France re-branded the National 1A to Division 1 Féminine (D1) in the 2002–03 season. Soubeyrand won the D1 inaugural season, scoring seven goals and, for her seasonal performances, was named the league's top player by the UNFP.

She made her European debut at the 2003–04 UEFA Women's Cup, where she played three matches and scored two goals, both against Polish side AZS Wrocław. The club finish that season's D1 in third place.

Juvisy finish as D1 runners up in 2004–05 and won the French Cup, beating Olympique Lyonnais (Lyon) in the final. After a 1–1 draw, the match was decided on penalty shoot-out, Soubeyrand took Juvisy's third shot which was saved by Lyon's goalkeeper Hope Solo, despite the non-conversion, Juvisy won 5–4.

She won the D1 for a second time in 2005–06 and played all 22 matches. In the following season, she played 21 matches in the D1 to finish third and one match in the 2006–07 UEFA Women's Cup. She was D1 runner up in 2007–08 and played 21 matches.

At the 2008–09 season, despite being 35 years old, Soubeyrand appeared in 20 of the club's 22 matches and scored seven goals helping Juvisy finish in third, one point shy of qualifying for the newly created UEFA Women's Champions League (re-branding of the UEFA Women's Cup).

In the following season, Soubeyrand took part in all 22 games in the league, scoring and assisting three goals. In the same season, Juvisy managed to qualify for the UEFA Women's Champions League but merely missed out on the league title to defending champions Lyon.

In the 2010–11 season with Juvisy, she participated in 21 league games, managing to go goalless, but assisting six goals. This was only the second time in her career with the club since 2001 that she did not score a league goal in a season. She finished the season in fourth place and also played in the Champions League, participating in nine games, scoring twice to reached the quarter-final stage, being badly beaten and knocked out of the competition 9–2 on aggregate against the finalists Turbine Potsdam.

In the 2011–12 season, Soubeyrand finished runners up once again with Juvisy, behind league winners Lyon.

In 2012–13, she ended the season in third place with Juvisy, but managed to go all the way to the semi-finals in the 2012–13 UEFA Women's Champions League where they suffered a heavy 9–1 defeat on aggregate to fellow country club Lyon.

In the 2013–14 league season, she finished third once again with Juvisy, assisting ten goals and scoring one. Sandrine retired after Juvisy's final league game of the 2013–14 season at the age of 40 after enjoying a 14-year spell at Juvisy, including over 280 matches played in all competitions, two league titles (2002–03 and 2005–06 seasons), a French Cup title (2004–05), and participated in the UEFA Women's Cup and the re-branded UEFA Women's Champions League.

== International career ==
As a Caluire SC player, Soubeyrand was called up for France women's national football team and made her international debut on 12 April 1997 in a 3–0 friendly match victory over Belgium. Later that year she took part on the UEFA Women's Euro 1997, playing all France's three matches in the tournament.

She played five matches at the 1999 FIFA Women's World Cup qualification, scoring her first goal on 11 April 1998 in a 3–2 defeat to Italy.

Over the following years she established herself as a capable midfielder, becoming a consistent presence in the French squads, accumulating appearances with the national team and eventually becoming the team's captain. Apart from major tournaments, she played in numerous friendlies and smaller international tournaments, such as qualifications for major tournaments, Algarve Cups and Cyprus Cups.

On 28 October 2009, she earned her record 143rd career international cap in a match against Estonia. The achievement surpassed French men's international defender Lilian Thuram as the nation's most capped football player.

After 16 years with the national team, Soubeyrand retired from international football at the age of 39, on 22 July 2013 after a 1–1 draw with Denmark. She played 198 matches (186 in the starting line up and 12 as incoming substitute) and scored 17 goals. Major tournaments played includes two FIFA Women's World Cups (2003 and 2011), five UEFA Women's Championships (1997, 2001, 2005, 2009 and 2013) and one Olympic Games (2012).

== Coaching career ==
In 2014, she was appointed coach of France women's national under-17 football team.

In 2018, she was named coach of Paris FC Women. She achieved the highest level of coaching certification in French football, BEPF, in 2023.

== Career statistics ==
=== Club ===
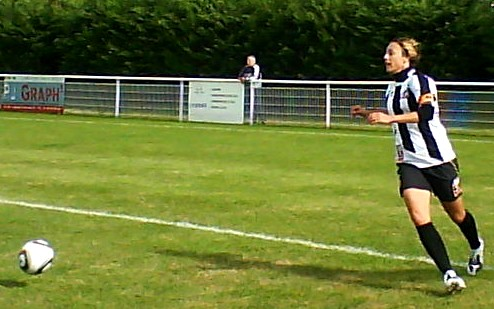
Soubeyrand playing for FCF Juvisy in 2010

Appearances and goals by club, season and competition
Club	Season	League		Cup		Continental		Total	
Club	Season	Apps	Goals	Apps	Goals	Apps	Goals	Apps	Goals
Caluire	1994–95			–	–	–	–		
Caluire	1995–96			–	–	–	–		
Caluire	1996–97			–	–	–	–		
Caluire	1997–98			–	–	–	–		
Caluire	1999–99			–	–	–	–		
Caluire	1999–00			–	–	–	–		
Caluire	Total			–	–	–	–		
Juvisy	2000–01	3	0	–	–	–	–	3	0
Juvisy	2001–02	3	2	–	–	–	–	3	2
Juvisy	2002–03	3	1	–	–	–	–	3	1
Juvisy	2003–04	21	5	–	–	3	2	24	7
Juvisy	2004–05	22	3	1	0	–	–	23	3
Juvisy	2005–06	22	3	–	–	–	–	22	3
Juvisy	2006–07	21	0	–	–	1	0	22	0
Juvisy	2007–08	21	2	4	0	–	–	25	2
Juvisy	2008–09	20	7	4	0	–	–	24	7
Juvisy	2009–10	22	3	4	1	–	–	26	4
Juvisy	2010–11	21	0	4	0	9	2	34	2
Juvisy	2011–12	21	4	3	0	–	–	24	4
Juvisy	2012–13	21	6	3	0	8	1	32	7
Juvisy	2013–14	21	1	2	0	–	–	23	1
Juvisy	Total	242	37	25	1	21	5	288	43
Career total		242	37	25	1	21	5	288	43

=== International ===
Appearances and goals by national team and year
National team	Year	Apps	Goals
France	1996–97	5	0
France	1997–98	10	2
France	1998–99	9	0
France	1999–00	9	0
France	2000–01	12	1
France	2001–02	10	2
France	2002–03	13	1
France	2003–04	15	0
France	2004–05	14	0
France	2005–06	13	6
France	2006–07	11	1
France	2007–08	7	1
France	2008–09	6	1
France	2009–10	16	2
France	2010–11	13	0
France	2011–12	14	0
France	2012–13	16	0
France	2013–14	5	0
Total		198	17

Scores and results list France's goal tally first, score column indicates score after each Soubeyrand goal.

List of international goals scored by Sandrine Soubeyrand
No.	Date	Venue	Opponent	Score	Result	Competition
1	11 April 1998	Stade Municipal des Allées, Blois, France	Italy	2–0	2–3	1999 FIFA Women's World Cup qualification
2	16 May 1998	Stade de la Route de Lorient, Rennes, France	Spain	3–2	3–2	Friendly
3	18 November 2000	Stade Robert Brettes, Mérignac, France	Greece	3–0	3–0	Friendly
4	20 April 2002	Stade de la Meinau, Strasbourg, France	Czech Republic	1–0	4–1	2003 FIFA Women's World Cup qualification
5	1 June 2002	Stade Gaston Petit, Châteauroux, France	Ukraine	2–1	2–1	2003 FIFA Women's World Cup qualification
6	22 February 2003	Stade Georges Dartiailh, Marmande, France	China	1–2	1–2	Friendly
7	5 November 2005	Neue Sportanlage Langenrohr, Langenrohr, Austria	Austria	2–1	3–1	2007 FIFA Women's World Cup qualification
8	5 November 2005	Neue Sportanlage Langenrohr, Langenrohr, Austria	Austria	3–1	3–1	2007 FIFA Women's World Cup qualification
9	9 November 2005	Stade Municipal des Allées, Blois, France	Hungary	1–0	2–0	2007 FIFA Women's World Cup qualification
10	22 April 2006	Stadion Eszperantó Út, Dunaújváros, Hungary	Hungary	4–0	5–0	2007 FIFA Women's World Cup qualification
11	13 May 2006	Oosterenkstadion, Zwolle, Netherlands	Netherlands	1–0	2–0	2007 FIFA Women's World Cup qualification
12	13 May 2006	Oosterenkstadion, Zwolle, Netherlands	Netherlands	2–0	2–0	2007 FIFA Women's World Cup qualification
13	11 April 2007	Stade Georges Pompidou, Valence, France	Greece	2–0	6–0	UEFA Women's Euro 2009 qualifying
14	23 April 2008	Yiannis Pathiakakis Stadium, Ano Liossia, Greece	Greece	1–0	5–0	UEFA Women's Euro 2009 qualifying
15	27 September 2008	Stade Henri Desgranges, La Roche-sur-Yon, France	Iceland	1–0	2–1	UEFA Women's Euro 2009 qualifying
16	23 September 2009	Stadion NK Inter Zaprešić, Zaprešić, Croatia	Croatia	1–0	7–0	2011 FIFA Women's World Cup qualification
17	5 May 2010	Stadion Rankhof, Basel, Switzerland	Switzerland	2–0	2–0	Friendly

== Honours ==
Juvisy

- Division 1 Féminine: 2002–03, 2005–06
- Coupe de France Féminine: 2004–05

France

- Cyprus Cup: 2012

Individual

- UNFP Female Player of the Year: 2002–03

Orders

- Knight of the National Order of Merit: 2011
- Knight of the Legion of Honour: 2023
