= 2010–11 UEFA Women's Champions League qualifying round =

Tournament details
- Dates: 5–10 August 2010
- Teams: 28

The 2010–11 UEFA Women's Champions League qualifying round was played on 5, 7 and 10 August 2010. A total of 28 teams competed in the qualifying round to decide 9 of the 32 places in the knockout phase of the 2010–11 UEFA Women's Champions League

The draw was held on 23 June 2010. 28 teams enter in the qualifying round, and were divided into seven groups of four teams, with one team from each seeding pot:

Pot 1

- (Sweden) Umeå
- (Germany) Duisburg
- (Denmark) Brøndby (host)
- (Russia) Rossiyanka
- (Italy) Bardolino
- (England) Everton
- (France) Juvisy

Pot 2

- (Iceland) Breiðablik (host)
- (Bosnia and Herzegovina) SFK 2000 Sarajevo
- (Portugal) 1º Dezembro
- (Bulgaria) NSA Sofia
- (Scotland) Glasgow City
- (Lithuania) Gintra Universitetas (host)
- (Slovenia) Krka (host)

Pot 3

- (Romania) FCM Târgu Mureş
- (Faroe Islands) KÍ Klaksvík
- (Croatia) Osijek (host)
- (Israel) ASA Tel Aviv University
- (Moldova) FC Roma Calfa
- (Slovakia) Slovan Bratislava
- (Wales) Swansea City

Pot 4

- (Republic of Ireland) St Francis
- (Cyprus) Apollon Limassol (host)
- (Estonia) Levadia Tallinn
- (Northern Ireland) Crusaders Newtownabbey Strikers (host)
- (North Macedonia) Borec Veles
- (Turkey) Gazi Üniversitesi
- (Georgia (country)) FC Baia Zugdidi

The seven hosts were confirmed by UEFA before the draw, and two hosts could not be placed in the same group. Brøndby, Gintra Universitetas, Krka, Osijek and Apollon Limassol also hosted tournaments last year. The other two hosts from last year (Linköping and Tikvesanka) did not enter the qualifying round this year.

Each team plays the other teams in the group once. The matches were played between 5 and 10 August 2010. Teams in italic hosted a mini-league.

== Tie-breaker criteria ==
As usual in UEFA competitions, three points are awarded for a win, and one point for a draw. If teams are equal on points after all matches have been played, the following criteria applies:

1. Higher number of points obtained in the matches among the teams in question.
2. Superior goal difference resulting from the matches among the teams in question.
3. Higher number of goals scored in the matches among the teams in question.
4. Superior goal difference in all group matches
5. Higher number of goals scored in all group matches
6. Higher number of club coefficient points
7. Drawing of lots

Criteria 1–3 are reapplied until the tie cannot be resolved; only then is criteria 4 used.

== Groups ==
=== Group 1 ===
Matches were played at Brøndby IF's bane 2 and Brøndby Stadium.

Pos	Team	Pld	W	D	L	GF	GA	GD	Pts	Qualification	BRØ	NSA	RCA	GAZ
1	(Denmark) Brøndby (H)	3	3	0	0	21	0	+21	9	Advance to main round	—	–	6–0	12–0
2	(Bulgaria) NSA Sofia	3	2	0	1	11	3	+8	6		0–3	—	–	7–0
3	(Moldova) Roma Calfa	3	0	1	2	3	13	−10	1		–	0–4	—	–
4	(Turkey) Gazi Üniversitesi	3	0	1	2	3	22	−19	1		–	–	3–3	—

(H) Hosts
5 August 2010
15:45

NSA Sofia (Bulgaria)	7–0	(Turkey) Gazi Üniversitesi
Gospodinova 9'; Koshuleva 30'; Kireva 60'; Radoyska 68', 84'; Tsekova 76'; Boyanova 89'	Report

Brøndby Stadium bane 2, Brøndby
Referee: Karolina Radzik-Johan (Poland)
5 August 2010
19:00

Brøndby (Denmark)	6–0	(Moldova) Roma Calfa
Rasmussen 8'; Troelsgaard 12', 43'; Dahl 35', 85'; Ancker 67'	Report

Brøndby Stadium bane 2, Brøndby
Referee: Anja Kunick (Germany)

7 August 2010
12:45

Brøndby (Denmark)	12–0	(Turkey) Gazi Üniversitesi
Ancker 4'; Madsen 11', 17'; Olsen 15'; Kur Larsen 18'; Eslund 37'; Brændstrup 40'; Andersen 51'; Dahl 63', 88'; Troelsgaard 67', 71'	Report

Brøndby Stadium bane 2, Brøndby
Referee: Karolina Radzik-Johan (Poland)
7 August 2010
16:00

Roma Calfa (Moldova)	0–4	(Bulgaria) NSA Sofia
	Report	Gospodinova 32'; Paduraru 37' (o.g.); Kireva 45+1'; Zhekova 90+3'

Brøndby Stadium bane 2, Brøndby
Referee: Lilach Asulin (Israel)

10 August 2010
18:00

NSA Sofia (Bulgaria)	0–3	(Denmark) Brøndby
	Report	Jensen 10'; Madsen 57'; Dahl 79'

Brøndby Stadium, Brøndby
Referee: Anja Kunick (Germany)
10 August 2010
18:00

Gazi Üniversitesi (Turkey)	3–3	(Moldova) Roma Calfa
Karagenç 37', 74'; Başkaya 48'	Report	Ninicu 14', 88'; Dragomir 33'

Brøndby Stadium bane 2, Brøndby
Referee: Lilach Asulin (Israel)

=== Group 2 ===
Matches were played at Savivaldybė Stadium, Šiauliai and City Stadium, Pakruojis.

Pos	Team	Pld	W	D	L	GF	GA	GD	Pts	Qualification	EVE	GIN	KIK	BVE
1	(England) Everton	3	3	0	0	23	0	+23	9	Advance to main round	—	–	6–0	10–0
2	(Lithuania) Gintra Universitetas (H)	3	1	1	1	4	7	−3	4		0–7	—	–	4–0
3	(Faroe Islands) KÍ Klaksvík	3	1	1	1	2	6	−4	4		–	0–0	—	–
4	(North Macedonia) Borec Veles	3	0	0	3	0	16	−16	0		–	–	0–2	—

(H) Hosts
5 August 2010
15:30

Everton (England)	6–0	(Faroe Islands) KÍ Klaksvík
Hinnigan 24'; Williams 38' (pen.), 88'; Dowie 40'; Duggan 47'; Harries 90+2'	Report

Savivaldybė Stadium, Šiauliai
Referee: Leen Martens (Belgium)
5 August 2010
19:30

Gintra Universitetas (Lithuania)	4–0	(North Macedonia) Borec Veles
Imanalijeva 3', 55', 58'; Greiere 52'	Report

Savivaldybė Stadium, Šiauliai
Referee: Petra Pavlikova (Slovakia)

7 August 2010
15:30

Everton (England)	10–0	(North Macedonia) Borec Veles
Scott 21'; Handley 22'; Williams 36'; Hinnigan 52'; Dowie 58'; Duggan 62'; Parris 72', 82'; Greenwood 80' (pen.); Harries 90+4'	Report

Savivaldybė Stadium, Šiauliai
Referee: Florence Guillemin (France)
7 August 2010
19:30

KÍ Klaksvík (Faroe Islands)	0–0	(Lithuania) Gintra Universitetas
	Report

Savivaldybė Stadium, Šiauliai
Referee: Petra Pavlikova (Slovakia)

10 August 2010
18:00

Gintra Universitetas (Lithuania)	0–7	(England) Everton
	Report	Duggan 3'; Hinnigan 12'; Handley 15', 31'; Dowie 23'; Harries 36'; Unitt 67'

Savivaldybė Stadium, Šiauliai
Referee: Florence Guillemin (France)
10 August 2010
18:00

Borec Veles (North Macedonia)	0–2	(Faroe Islands) KÍ Klaksvík
	Report	Andreasen 16'; Hansen 69'

City Stadium, Pakruojis
Referee: Leen Martens (Belgium)

=== Group 3 ===
Matches were played at Neo GSZ Stadium, Larnaca and Tsirion Stadium, Limassol.

Pos	Team	Pld	W	D	L	GF	GA	GD	Pts	Qualification	APL	UME	ASA	2KS
1	(Cyprus) Apollon Limassol (H)	3	3	0	0	13	2	+11	9	Advance to main round	—	–	3–0	–
2	(Sweden) Umeå	3	2	0	1	5	4	+1	6		1–4	—	3–0	–
3	(Israel) ASA Tel Aviv University	3	1	0	2	3	7	−4	3		–	–	—	3–1
4	(Bosnia and Herzegovina) SFK Sarajevo	3	0	0	3	2	10	−8	0		1–6	0–1	–	—

(H) Hosts
5 August 2010
17:00

Umeå (Sweden)	3–0	(Israel) ASA Tel Aviv University
E. Åberg-Zingmark 11'; Kapstad 86'; Molin 90+2'	Report

Neo GSZ Stadium, Larnaca
Referee: Carina Vitulano (Italy)
5 August 2010
20:00

SFK Sarajevo (Bosnia and Herzegovina)	1–6	(Cyprus) Apollon Limassol
Pušćul 64'	Report	Olar 4'; Kostova 5', 28'; Laiu 33'; Iuşan 47', 83' (pen.)

Neo GSZ Stadium, Larnaca
Referee: Morag Pirie (Scotland)

7 August 2010
17:00

Umeå (Sweden)	1–4	(Cyprus) Apollon Limassol
Saari 40' (pen.)	Report	Solomou 16'; Iuşan 34' (pen.), 47'; Rus 45'

Tsirion Stadium, Limassol
Referee: Marina Mamaeva (Russia)
7 August 2010
20:00

ASA Tel Aviv University (Israel)	3–1	(Bosnia and Herzegovina) SFK Sarajevo
Jean 14'; Shenar 24'; Stein 88'	Report	Kuliš 51'

Tsirion Stadium, Limassol
Referee: Morag Pirie (Scotland)

10 August 2010
18:00

SFK Sarajevo (Bosnia and Herzegovina)	0–1	(Sweden) Umeå
	Report	Chikwelu 74'

Neo GSZ Stadium, Larnaca
Referee: Marina Mamaeva (Russia)
10 August 2010
18:00

Apollon Limassol (Cyprus)	3–0	(Israel) ASA Tel Aviv University
Kostova 13'; Laiu 40'; Iuşan 54'	Report

Tsirion Stadium, Limassol
Referee: Carina Vitulano (Italy)

=== Group 4 ===
Matches were played at Kópavogsvöllur, Kópavogur and Víkingsvöllur, Reykjavík.

Pos	Team	Pld	W	D	L	GF	GA	GD	Pts	Qualification	JUV	BRE	TMU	LTA
1	(France) Juvisy	3	2	1	0	20	4	+16	7	Advance to main round	—	–	5–1	12–0
2	(Iceland) Breiðablik (H)	3	2	1	0	18	4	+14	7	Advance to main round	3–3	—	–	8–1
3	(Romania) FCM Târgu Mureş	3	1	0	2	3	13	−10	3		–	0–7	—	–
4	(Estonia) Levadia Tallinn	3	0	0	3	2	22	−20	0		–	–	1–2	—

(H) Hosts
5 August 2010
17:00

Juvisy (France)	5–1	(Romania) FCM Târgu Mureş
Tonazzi 8', 17', 65'; Trimoreau 43'; Lebailly 87'	Report	Gheorghiulescu 45+2'

Kópavogsvöllur, Kópavogur
Referee: Gordana Kuzmanovic (Serbia)
5 August 2010
20:00

Breiðablik (Iceland)	8–1	(Estonia) Levadia Tallinn
Magnúsdóttir 25'; Samúelsdóttir 35'; Gunnarsdóttir 37'; Hauksdóttir 39', 57'; Þorsteinsdóttir 52', 67', 88'	Report	Jekimova 68'

Kópavogsvöllur, Kópavogur
Referee: Rhona Daly (Ireland)

7 August 2010
17:00

Juvisy (France)	12–0	(Estonia) Levadia Tallinn
Soubeyrand 17' (pen.); Machart 29', 31', 35', 51'; Pourtalet 40', 52'; Fernandes 44'; Thiney 72'; Lebailly 77', 89'; Mendes 88'	Report

Kópavogsvöllur, Kópavogur
Referee: Laurence Zeien (Luxembourg)
7 August 2010
20:00

FCM Târgu Mureş (Romania)	0–7	(Iceland) Breiðablik
	Report	Mate 4' (o.g.); Gunnarsdóttir 16', 70'; Þorsteinsdóttir 39'; Þorvaldsdóttir 58', 72'; Gunnlaugsdóttir 64' (pen.)

Kópavogsvöllur, Kópavogur
Referee: Rhona Daly (Ireland)

10 August 2010
18:00

Breiðablik (Iceland)	3–3	(France) Juvisy
Þorsteinsdóttir 19'; Pourtalet 70' (o.g.); Þorvaldsdóttir 84'	Report	Machart 57'; Coquet 62'; Mendes 74'

Kópavogsvöllur, Kópavogur
Referee: Gordana Kuzmanovic (Serbia)
10 August 2010
18:00

Levadia Tallinn (Estonia)	1–2	(Romania) FCM Târgu Mureş
Khvatova 56'	Report	Z. Sinka 4'; Sandu 90+1'

Víkingsvöllur, Reykjavík
Referee: Laurence Zeien (Luxembourg)

=== Group 5 ===
Matches were played at Matija Gubec Stadium, Krško and Ivančna Gorica Stadium, Ivančna Gorica.

Pos	Team	Pld	W	D	L	GF	GA	GD	Pts	Qualification	BAR	KRK	SWA	BZU
1	(Italy) Bardolino	3	3	0	0	14	1	+13	9	Advance to main round	—	–	7–0	3–0
2	(Slovenia) Krka (H)	3	2	0	1	9	4	+5	6	Advance to main round	1–4	—	–	4–0
3	(Wales) Swansea City	3	1	0	2	2	12	−10	3		–	0–4	—	–
4	(Georgia (country)) Baia Zugdidi	3	0	0	3	1	9	−8	0		–	–	1–2	—

(H) Hosts
5 August 2010
15:45

Bardolino (Italy)	7–0	(Wales) Swansea City
Gabbiadini 9', 52', 70'; Tuttino 35', 45+1'; Powe 68' (o.g.); Di Criscio 90'	Report

Matija Gubec Stadium, Krško
Referee: Esther Azzopardi (Malta)
5 August 2010
20:45

Krka (Slovenia)	abandoned^{*}	(Georgia (country)) Baia Zugdidi

Matija Gubec Stadium, Krško
Referee: Yuliya Medvedeva-Keldyusheva (Kazakhstan)

Krka vs Baia Zugdidi was abandoned due to bad pitch conditions. The match was replayed on 8 August 2010.

8 August 2010
20:45

Krka (Slovenia)	4–0	(Georgia (country)) Baia Zugdidi
Stipič 14'; Pavlović 68'; Pešić 86'; Erman 90+1'	Report

Matija Gubec Stadium, Krško
Referee: Yuliya Medvedeva-Keldyusheva (Kazakhstan)

7 August 2010
15:45

Bardolino (Italy)	3–0	(Georgia (country)) Baia Zugdidi
Girelli 37'; Gabbiadini 49'; Cantoro 83' (pen.)	Report

Matija Gubec Stadium, Krško
Referee: Esther Azzopardi (Malta)
7 August 2010
20:45

Swansea City (Wales)	0–4	(Slovenia) Krka
	Report	Nikl 27'; Milkovič 30'; Čonč 47'; Erman 67'

Matija Gubec Stadium, Krško
Referee: Olga Tanschi (Moldova)

10 August 2010
18:00

Krka (Slovenia)	1–4	(Italy) Bardolino
Nikl 50'	Report	Girelli 9'; Gabbiadini 40'; Tuttino 68'; Di Criscio 84'

Matija Gubec Stadium, Krško
Referee: Yuliya Medvedeva-Keldyusheva (Kazakhstan)
10 August 2010
18:00

Baia Zugdidi (Georgia (country))	1–2	(Wales) Swansea City
Chichinadze 4'	Report	Ashford 13' (pen.); Morgan 17'

Ivančna Gorica Stadium, Ivančna Gorica
Referee: Olga Tanschi (Moldova)

=== Group 6 ===
Matches were played at Gradski vrt, Osijek and Stadion HNK Cibalia, Vinkovci.

Pos	Team	Pld	W	D	L	GF	GA	GD	Pts	Qualification	ROS	SFR	DEZ	OSI
1	(Russia) Rossiyanka	3	3	0	0	18	1	+17	9	Advance to main round	—	9–0	–	5–0
2	(Republic of Ireland) St Francis	3	2	0	1	9	13	−4	6		–	—	–	5–3
3	(Portugal) 1º Dezembro	3	1	0	2	6	9	−3	3		1–4	1–4	—	–
4	(Croatia) Osijek (H)	3	0	0	3	4	14	−10	0		–	–	1–4	—

(H) Hosts
5 August 2010
17:00

Rossiyanka (Russia)	5–0	(Croatia) Osijek
Shmachkova 41'; Ogbiagbevha 49'; Shlyapina 53'; Morozova 78'; Levykina 89'	Report

Gradski vrt, Osijek
Referee: Aneliya Sinabova (Bulgaria)
5 August 2010
20:00

1º Dezembro (Portugal)	1–4	(Republic of Ireland) St Francis
Paula Cristina 18'	Report	Murray 9'; Jones 34', 46'; O'Reilly 53'

Gradski vrt, Osijek
Referee: Sofia Karagiorgi (Cyprus)

7 August 2010
17:00

Rossiyanka (Russia)	9–0	(Republic of Ireland) St Francis
Ogbiagbevha 4', 34', 37', 42'; Morozova 20'; Chorna 26'; Shlyapina 43', 90+2'; Nyandeni 60'	Report

Gradski vrt, Osijek
Referee: Knarik Grigoryan (Armenia)
7 August 2010
20:00

Osijek (Croatia)	1–4	(Portugal) 1º Dezembro
Balog 11'	Report	Paula Cristina 31', 86'; Lara Matos 41'; Carolina Mendes 43'

Gradski vrt, Osijek
Referee: Sofia Karagiorgi (Cyprus)

10 August 2010
18:00

1º Dezembro (Portugal)	1–4	(Russia) Rossiyanka
Paula Cristina 51'	Report	Skotnikova 3'; Levykina 9'; Nyandeni 18'; Slonova 33'

Stadion HNK Cibalia, Vinkovci
Referee: Aneliya Sinabova (Bulgaria)
10 August 2010
18:00

St Francis (Republic of Ireland)	5–3	(Croatia) Osijek
Hughes 56', 67'; Mulhall 58'; Jones 77'; Herbert 90+1'	Report	Balog 3'; Joščak 7' (pen.); Šalek 17'

Gradski vrt, Osijek
Referee: Knarik Grigoryan (Armenia)

=== Group 7 ===
Matches were played at the Showgrounds, Ballymena; Stangmore Park, Dungannon and Mill Meadow, Castledawson.

Pos	Team	Pld	W	D	L	GF	GA	GD	Pts	Qualification	DUI	GLA	SBR	CNS
1	(Germany) Duisburg	3	3	0	0	13	1	+12	9	Advance to main round	—	–	3–0	6–1
2	(Scotland) Glasgow City	3	2	0	1	12	4	+8	6		0–4	—	–	8–0
3	(Slovakia) Slovan Bratislava	3	1	0	2	1	7	−6	3		–	0–4	—	–
4	(Northern Ireland) Crusaders Newtownabbey Strikers (H)	3	0	0	3	1	15	−14	0		–	–	0–1	—

(H) Hosts
5 August 2010
17:00

Duisburg (Germany)	3–0	(Slovakia) Slovan Bratislava
Popp 57'; Oster 62'; Laudehr 86'	Report

Mill Meadow, Castledawson
Referee: Dilan Gökçek (Turkey)
5 August 2010
20:30

Glasgow City (Scotland)	8–0	(Northern Ireland) Crusaders Newtownabbey
Gemmell 12', 72'; Corsie 15', 85'; Ross 29', 80'; Lappin 43'; Lindner 59'	Report

Mill Meadow, Castledawson
Referee: Jana Adámková (Czech Republic)

7 August 2010
16:00

Slovan Bratislava (Slovakia)	0–4	(Scotland) Glasgow City
	Report	Lappin 26'; Ross 45'; Corsie 74'; Littlejohn 81'

The Showgrounds, Ballymena
Referee: Katalin Kulcsar (Hungary)
7 August 2010
19:00

Duisburg (Germany)	6–1	(Northern Ireland) Crusaders Newtownabbey
Wensing 3', 6'; Roelvink 33'; Kiesel-Griffioen 36', 84'; Krahn 73'	Report	Nelson 52'

The Showgrounds, Ballymena
Referee: Dilan Gökçek (Turkey)

10 August 2010
18:00

Glasgow City (Scotland)	0–4	(Germany) Duisburg
	Report	Kiesel-Griffioen 11'; Grings 27', 32'; Laudehr 83' (pen.)

The Showgrounds, Ballymena
Referee: Jana Adámková (Czech Republic)
10 August 2010
18:00

Crusaders Newtownabbey (Northern Ireland)	0–1	(Slovakia) Slovan Bratislava
	Report	Mravíková 14'

Stangmore Park, Dungannon
Referee: Katalin Kulcsar (Hungary)

=== Ranking of group runners-up ===
The two best runners-up also qualify for the round of 32. The match against the fourth-placed team in the group does not count for the purposes of the runners-up table. The tie-breakers in this ranking are:

1. Higher number of points obtained
2. Superior goal difference
3. Higher number of goals scored
4. Higher number of club coefficient points
5. Fair play conduct in all group matches

Pos	Grp	Team	Pld	W	D	L	GF	GA	GD	Pts	Qualification
1	4	(Iceland) Breiðablik	2	1	1	0	10	3	+7	4	Advance to main round
2	5	(Slovenia) Krka	2	1	0	1	5	4	+1	3	Advance to main round
3	1	(Bulgaria) NSA Sofia	2	1	0	1	4	3	+1	3	
4	3	(Sweden) Umeå	2	1	0	1	4	4	0	3	
5	7	(Scotland) Glasgow City	2	1	0	1	4	4	0	3	
6	6	(Republic of Ireland) St Francis	2	1	0	1	4	10	−6	3	
7	2	(Lithuania) Gintra Universitetas	2	0	1	1	0	7	−7	1	
