= 2010–11 UEFA Women's Champions League knockout phase =

Tournament details
- Dates: 22 September 2010 – 26 May 2011
- Teams: 32

The 2010–11 UEFA Women's Champions League knockout phase began on 22 September 2010 and concluded on 26 May 2011 with the final at Craven Cottage in London, England to decide the champions of the 2010–11 UEFA Women's Champions League. A total of 32 teams competed in the knockout phase.

== Round and draw dates ==
UEFA has scheduled the competition as follows.

Round	Draw	First leg	Second leg
Round of 32	19 August 2010	22–23 September 2010	13–14 October 2010
Round of 16	19 August 2010	3–4 November 2010	10–11 November 2010
Quarter-final	19 November 2010	16–17 March 2011	23–24 March 2011
Semi-final	19 November 2010	9–10 April 2011	16–17 April 2011
Final	19 November 2010	26 May 2011	

== Format ==
The knockout phase involved 32 teams: 22 teams which qualified directly, and 10 teams which qualified from the qualifying round (eight group winners and two best runners-up).

Each tie in the knockout phase, apart from the final, was played over two legs, with each team playing one leg at home. The team that scored more goals on aggregate over the two legs advanced to the next round. If the aggregate score was level, the away goals rule was applied, i.e. the team that scored more goals away from home over the two legs advanced. If away goals were also equal, then 30 minutes of extra time were played. The away goals rule was again applied after extra time, i.e. if there were goals scored during extra time and the aggregate score was still level, the visiting team advanced by virtue of more away goals scored. If no goals were scored during extra time, the tie was decided by a penalty shoot-out. In the final, which was played as a single match, if scores were level at the end of normal time, extra time was played, followed by a penalty shoot-out if scores remained tied.

The mechanism of the draws for each round was as follows:

- In the draw for the round of 32, 16 teams were seeded and 16 teams were unseeded, based on their UEFA club coefficients at the beginning of the season. The seeded teams were drawn against the unseeded teams, with the seeded teams hosting the second leg. Teams from the same group or the same association could not be drawn against each other.
- In the draws for the round of 16 onwards, there were no seedings, and teams from the same group or the same association could be drawn against each other.

== Knockout phase ==
The draw for the round of 32 and round of 16 was held on 19 August 2010. The draw for the quarter-finals and onwards was made on 19 November 2010. The bracket has been created in retrospect.

== Bracket ==
Round of 32
(Belarus) Zorka-BDU Minsk	1	0	1
(Norway) Røa	2	0	2
(Cyprus) Apollon Limassol	1	1	2
(Russia) Zvezda Perm	2	2	4
(Ukraine) Lehenda-ShVSM	1	0	1
(Russia) Rossiyanka	3	4	7
(Netherlands) AZ	1	0	1
(France) Lyon	2	8	10
(Spain) Rayo Vallecano	3	1	4
(Iceland) Valur	0	1	1
(Serbia) Mašinac Niš	1	0	1
(England) Arsenal	3	9	12
(Slovenia) Krka	0	0	0
(Sweden) Linköping	7	5	12
(Belgium) Sint-Truiden	0	0	0
(Czech Republic) Sparta Prague	3	7	10
(Poland) Unia Racibórz	1	1	2
(Denmark) Brøndby (a)	2	0	2
(Hungary) MTK Hungária	0	1	1
(England) Everton	0	7	7
(Kazakhstan) CSHVSM	0	0	0
(Germany) Duisburg	5	6	11
(Denmark) Fortuna	8	6	14
(Italy) Bardolino	0	1	1
(Switzerland) Zürich	2	1	3
(Italy) Torres	3	4	7
(Iceland) Breiðablik	0	0	0
(France) Juvisy	3	6	9
(Finland) Åland United	0	0	0
(Germany) Turbine Potsdam	9	6	15
(Greece) PAOK	1	0	1
(Austria) Neulengbach	0	3	3

Round of 16
(Norway) Røa	1	0	1
(Russia) Zvezda Perm	1	4	5
(Russia) Rossiyanka	1	0	1
(France) Lyon	6	5	11
(Spain) Rayo Vallecano	2	1	3
(England) Arsenal	0	4	4
(Sweden) Linköping	2	1	3
(Czech Republic) Sparta Prague	0	0	0
(Denmark) Brøndby	1	1	2
(England) Everton	4	1	5
(Germany) Duisburg	4	3	7
(Denmark) Fortuna	2	0	2
(Italy) Torres	1	2	3
(France) Juvisy (a.e.t.)	2	2	4
(Germany) Turbine Potsdam	7	9	16
(Austria) Neulengbach	0	0	0

Quarter-finals
(Russia) Zvezda Perm	0	0	0
(France) Lyon	0	1	1
(England) Arsenal (a)	1	2	3
(Sweden) Linköping	1	2	3
(England) Everton	1	1	2
(Germany) Duisburg	3	2	5
(France) Juvisy	0	2	2
(Germany) Turbine Potsdam	3	6	9

Semi-finals
(France) Lyon	2	3	5
(England) Arsenal	0	2	2
(Germany) Duisburg	2	0	2
(Germany) Turbine Potsdam	2	1	3

Final
(France) Lyon	2
(Germany) Turbine Potsdam	0

== Round of 32 ==
16 teams are seeded in this round, and play the second leg at home. Teams from the same association may not play each other. The first leg is scheduled for the week of 22 September 2010, the second leg for the week of 13 October 2010. The draw was made on 19 August 2010.

Team 1	Agg.	Team 2	1st leg	2nd leg
Zorka-BDU Minsk (Belarus)	1–2	(Norway) Røa	1–2	0–0
Apollon Limassol (Cyprus)	2–4	(Russia) Zvezda 2005 Perm	1–2	1–2
Lehenda-ShVSM (Ukraine)	1–7	(Russia) Rossiyanka	1–3	0–4
AZ (Netherlands)	1–10	(France) Lyon	1–2	0–8
Rayo Vallecano (Spain)	4–1	(Iceland) Valur	3–0	1–1
Mašinac Niš (Serbia)	1–12	(England) Arsenal	1–3	0–9
Krka (Slovenia)	0–12	(Sweden) Linköping	0–7	0–5
Sint-Truiden (Belgium)	0–10	(Czech Republic) Sparta Prague	0–3	0–7
Unia Racibórz (Poland)	2–2 (a)	(Denmark) Brøndby	1–2	1–0
MTK (Hungary)	1–7	(England) Everton	0–0	1–7
SSHVSM (Kazakhstan)	0–11	(Germany) Duisburg	0–5	0–6
Fortuna Hjørring (Denmark)	14–1	(Italy) Bardolino	8–0	6–1
Zürich (Switzerland)	3–7	(Italy) Torres	2–3	1–4
Breiðablik (Iceland)	0–9	(France) Juvisy	0–3	0–6
Åland United (Finland)	0–15	(Germany) Turbine Potsdam	0–9	0–6
PAOK (Greece)	1–3	(Austria) Neulengbach	1–0	0–3

22 September 2010
15:00 (CET)

Zorka-BDU Minsk (Belarus)	1–2	(Norway) Røa
Barkovskaya 45'	Report	Thorsnes 13'; Stange 78'

Dinamo-Yuni Stadium, Minsk
Attendance: 1,100
Referee: Gordana Kuzmanović (Serbia)
13 October 2010
15:00 (CET)

Røa (Norway)	0–0	(Belarus) Zorka-BDU Minsk
	Report

Røa Stadium, Oslo
Referee: Lilach Asulin (Israel)

Røa won 2–1 on aggregate.

22 September 2010
15:45 (CET)

Apollon Limassol (Cyprus)	1–2	(Russia) Zvezda
Rus 27'	Report	Ruiz 48'; Leyva 76'

Tsirio Stadium, Limassol
Attendance: 560
Referee: Jana Adámková (Czech Republic)
13 October 2010
15:00 (CET)

Zvezda (Russia)	2–1	(Cyprus) Apollon Limassol
Kurochkina 53'; Djatel 60'	Report	Kostova 71'

Zvezda Stadium, Perm
Referee: Kirsi Heikkinen (Finland)

Zvezda won 4–2 on aggregate.

22 September 2010
17:00 (18:00 EEST)

Lehenda-ShVSM (Ukraine)	1–3	(Russia) Rossiyanka
Melkonyants 32'	Report	Petrova 49', 80'; Skotnikova 81'

Yuri Gagarin Stadium, Chernihiv
Attendance: 1050
Referee: Carina Vitulano (Italy)
14 October 2010
13:00 (15:00 MSK)

Rossiyanka (Russia)	4–0	(Ukraine) Lehenda-ShVSM
Nyandeni 4', 33'; Shlyapina 38'; Slonova 80'	Report

Krasnoarmeysk Stadium, Krasnoarmeysk
Attendance: 350
Referee: Floarea Babadac (Romania)

Rossiyanka won 7–1 on aggregate.

22 September 2010
19:00 (CET)

AZ (Netherlands)	1–2	(France) Lyon
van den Heiligenberg 72'	Report	Le Sommer 53'; Renard 67'

AFAS Stadion, Alkmaar
Attendance: 1100
Referee: Sandra Bastos (Portugal)
14 October 2010
17:00 (CET)

Lyon (France)	8–0	(Netherlands) AZ
Schelin 10', 23', 33'; Renard 27'; Élodie Thomis 40'; Dickenmann 65'; Cruz 69'; Le Sommer 90+1' (pen.)	Report

Stade de Gerland, Lyon
Referee: Esther Staubli (Switzerland)

Lyon won 10–1 on aggregate.

23 September 2010
20:00 (CET)

Rayo Vallecano (Spain)	3–0	(Iceland) Valur
Natalia 5'; Martín 36'; Hermoso 59'	Report

Campo de Fútbol de Vallecas, Madrid
Attendance: 2310
Referee: Rhona Daly (Ireland)
13 October 2010
17:30 (CET)

Valur (Iceland)	1–1	(Spain) Rayo Vallecano
Galán 88' (o.g.)	Report	Martín 57'

Hlíðarendi, Reykjavík
Referee: Natalia Avdonchenko (Russia)

Rayo Vallecano won 4–1 on aggregate.

22 September 2010
15:30 (CET)

Mašinac Niš (Serbia)	1–3	(England) Arsenal
Radojičić 62'	Report	Yankey 12'; Flaherty 86'; Carter 88'

Mašinac Stadium, Niš
Attendance: 3122
Referee: Betina Norman (Denmark)
14 October 2010
15:00 (CET)

Arsenal (England)	9–0	(Serbia) Mašinac Niš
Yankey 19'; E. White 23'; Little 26', 42'; Davison 52'; Nobbs 55'; Sampanidis 79' (o.g.); Carter 85'; Ludlow 90+2'	Report

Meadow Park, Borehamwood
Referee: Marina Mamaeva (Russia)

Arsenal won 12–1 on aggregate.

22 September 2010
17:30 (CET)

Krka (Slovenia)	0–7	(Sweden) Linköping
	Report	Sällström 6'; Asllani 10', 35'; Fors 22'; Ikidi 33'; M. Karlsson 68'; M.J. Karlsson 73'

Matija Gubec Stadium, Krško
Attendance: 200
Referee: Petra Chudá (Slovakia)
14 October 2010
17:30 (CET)

Linköping (Sweden)	5–0	(Slovenia) Krka
Sällström 13'; Brännström 60'; M.J. Karlsson 70'; Fors 84', 90+4'	Report

Folkungavallen, Linköping
Referee: Kateryna Monzul (Ukraine)

Linköping won 12–0 on aggregate.

29 September 2010
20:00 (CET)

Sint-Truidense (Belgium)	0–3	(Czech Republic) Sparta Prague
	Report	L. Martínková 5'; Kožárová 67'; Čulová 85'

Stayen, Sint-Truiden
Attendance: 215
Referee: Karolina Radzik-Johan (Poland)
14 October 2010
15:30 (CET)

Sparta Prague (Czech Republic)	7–0	(Belgium) Sint-Truidense
L. Martínková 27', 38'; Pivoňková 36'; Ondrušová 52', 85'; Došková 70'; I. Martínková 76'	Report

Stadion Lokomotiva Praha, Prague
Referee: Jenny Palmqvist (Sweden)

Sparta won 10–0 on aggregate.

22 September 2010
16:00 (CET)

Unia Racibórz (Poland)	1–2	(Denmark) Brøndby
Winczo 37'	Report	Pries Andersen 54'; Kur Larsen 67'

OSiR Stadium, Racibórz
Attendance: 3000
Referee: Katalin Kulcsar (Hungary)
13 October 2010
19:30 (CET)

Brøndby (Denmark)	0–1	(Poland) Unia Racibórz
	Report	Stobba 7'

Brøndby Stadium, Brøndby
Referee: Esther Azzopardi (Malta)

2–2 on aggregate. Brøndby won on away goals.

23 September 2010
18:00 (CET)

MTK (Hungary)	0–0	(England) Everton
	Report

Hidegkuti Nándor Stadion, Budapest
Attendance: 2000
Referee: Ausra Kance (Lithuania)
14 October 2010
20:00 (CET)

Everton (England)	7–1	(Hungary) MTK
Dowie 9'; Chaplen 11', 73', 90+1'; Duggan 21', 67'; Gál 45+1' (o.g.)	Report	Papp 66'

Stobart Halton, Widnes
Referee: Yuliya Medvedeva-Keldyusheva (Kazakhstan)

Everton won 7–1 on aggregate.

23 September 2010
13:00 (CET)

SSHVSM (Kazakhstan)	0–5	(Germany) Duisburg
	Report	Grings 19', 28', 48', 88'; Laudehr 34'

Shakhter Stadium, Karaganda
Attendance: 1200
Referee: Aneliya Sinabova (Bulgaria)
13 October 2010
15:00 (CET)

Duisburg (Germany)	6–0	(Kazakhstan) SSHVSM
Grings 45+1', 71', 75', 78'; Müller 50'; Laudehr 86'	Report

PCC-Stadion, Duisburg
Referee: Silvia Tea Spinelli (Italy)

Duisburg won 11–0 on aggregate.

22 September 2010
19:00 (CET)

Fortuna Hjørring (Denmark)	8–0	(Italy) Bardolino
Rydahl Bukh 4'; Paaske-Sørensen 7', 64', 69', 88', 90+2'; Arnth Jensen 39'; Mogensen 67'	Report

Hjørring Stadium, Hjørring
Attendance: 1791
Referee: Claudine Brohet (Belgium)
13 October 2010
20:00 (CET)

Bardolino (Italy)	1–6	(Denmark) Fortuna Hjørring
Girelli 17'	Report	Igbo 4'; Paaske Sørensen 18', 76'; Mogensen 52'; Munk 72', 90+3'

Stadio Marcantonio Bentegodi, Verona
Referee: Amy Rayner (England)

Fortuna won 14–1 on aggregate.

22 September 2010
19:45 (CET)

Zürich (Switzerland)	2–3	(Italy) Torres
Kiwic 2'; Zumbühl 36'	Report	Camporese 24', 51'; Fuselli 38'

Stadion Schützenwiese, Winterthur
Attendance: 1500
Referee: Alexandra Ihringova (England)
13 October 2010
15:00 (CET)

Torres (Italy)	4–1	(Switzerland) Zürich
Fuselli 16'; Camporese 26', 29'; Domenichetti 55'	Report	Brandenberger 84'

Stadio Vanni Sanna, Sassari
Referee: Gyöngyi Gaál (Hungary)

Torres won 7–3 on aggregate.

23 September 2010
17:00 (CET)

Breidablik (Iceland)	0–3	(France) Juvisy
	Report	Soubeyrand 7'; Thiney 72'; Tonazzi 78'

Kópavogsvöllur, Kópavogur
Attendance: 250
Referee: Anja Kunick (Germany)
14 October 2010
19:30 (CET)

Juvisy (France)	6–0	(Iceland) Breidablik
Coquet 33', 56'; Machart 59', 73', 86'; Thiney 61'	Report

Robert Bobin, Evry
Referee: Christina Westrum Pedersen (Norway)

Juvisy won 9–0 on aggregate.

22 September 2010
18:00 (CET)

Åland (Finland)	0–9	(Germany) Turbine Potsdam
	Report	Bajramaj 5'; Mittag 17', 72', 90+3'; Schmidt 34'; Nagasato 35'; Kemme 58'; Peter 70'; Demann 79'

Wiklöf Holding Arena, Mariehamn
Attendance: 1553
Referee: Cristina Dorcioman (Romania)
13 October 2010
16:00 (CET)

Turbine Potsdam (Germany)	6–0	(Finland) Åland
Bajramaj 1'; Wesely 4'; Keßler 30'; Mittag 40'; Schmidt 59'; Peter 68'	Report

Karl-Liebknecht-Stadion, Potsdam
Referee: Efthalia Mitsi (Greece)

Turbine Potsdam won 15–0 on aggregate.

22 September 2010
18:00 (CET)

PAOK (Greece)	1–0	(Austria) Neulengbach
Panteliadou 29'	Report

Toumba Stadium, Thessaloniki
Attendance: 350
Referee: Ann-Helen Østervold (Norway)
October 13, 2010
19:30 (CET)

Neulengbach (Austria)	3–0	(Greece) PAOK
Burger 11', 19', 43'	Report

Wienerwaldstadion, Neulengbach
Referee: Morag Pirie (Scotland)

Neulengbach won 3–1 on aggregate.

== Round of 16 ==
The draws for this and all subsequent rounds are not seeded, and clubs from the same association may play each other. This round is scheduled for the week of 3 November and the week of 10 November 2010.

Team 1	Agg.	Team 2	1st leg	2nd leg
Røa (Norway)	1–5	(Russia) Zvezda 2005 Perm	1–1	0–4
Rossiyanka (Russia)	1–11	(France) Lyon	1–6	0–5
Rayo Vallecano (Spain)	3–4	(England) Arsenal	2–0	1–4
Linköping (Sweden)	3–0	(Czech Republic) Sparta Prague	2–0	1–0
Brøndby (Denmark)	2–5	(England) Everton	1–4	1–1
Duisburg (Germany)	7–2	(Denmark) Fortuna Hjørring	4–2	3–0
Torres (Italy)	3–4	(France) Juvisy	1–2	2–2 (a.e.t.)
Turbine Potsdam (Germany)	16–0	(Austria) Neulengbach	7–0	9–0

3 November 2010
14:30 (CET)

Røa (Norway)	1–1	(Russia) Zvezda 2005 Perm
Thorsnes 87'	Report	Khodyreva 90+4'

Røa Stadium, Oslo
Referee: Katalin Kulcsar (Hungary)
10 November 2010
15:00 (CET)

Zvezda 2005 Perm (Russia)	4–0	(Norway) Røa
Djatel 24'; Ruiz 70'; Apanashchenko 82'; Dyatchkova 90+1'	Report

Zvezda Stadium, Perm
Referee: Jenny Palmqvist (Sweden)

Zvezda 2005 Perm won 5–1 on aggregate.

4 November 2010
12:15 (CET)

Rossiyanka (Russia)	1–6	(France) Lyon
Ogbiagbevha 53'	Report	Schelin 11', 30', 72', 79'; Abily 18'; Nécib 81'

Krasnoarmeysk Stadium, Krasnoarmeysk
Referee: Efthalia Mitsi (Greece)
10 November 2010
16:00 (CET)

Lyon (France)	5–0	(Russia) Rossiyanka
Le Sommer 22' (pen.); Kozhnikova 50' (o.g.); Bompastor 53'; Dickenmann 67'; Brétigny 89'	Report

Stade de Gerland, Lyon
Referee: Alexandra Ihringova (England)

Lyon won 11–1 on aggregate.

4 November 2010
20:00 (CET)

Rayo Vallecano (Spain)	2–0	(England) Arsenal
de Pablos 1'; Bermúdez 74'	Report

Campo de Fútbol de Vallecas, Madrid
Referee: Silvia Tea Spinelli (Italy)
11 November 2010
14:00 (CET)

Arsenal (England)	4–1	(Spain) Rayo Vallecano
Yankey 11'; Fleeting 61'; Grant 68'; Beattie 90+1'	Report	Martín 78'

Meadow Park, Borehamwood
Referee: Bibiana Steinhaus (Germany)

Arsenal won 4–3 on aggregate.

3 November 2010
13:00 (CET)

Linköping (Sweden)	2–0	(Czech Republic) Sparta Prague
Rohlin 54'; Wik 81'	Report

Folkungavallen, Linköping
Referee: Natalia Avdonchenko (Russia)
10 November 2010
14:00 (CET)

Sparta Prague (Czech Republic)	0–1	(Sweden) Linköping
	Report	Asllani 62'

Stadion Lokomotiva Praha, Prague
Referee: Kirsi Heikkinen (Finland)

Linköping won 3–0 on aggregate.

3 November 2010
18:30 (CET)

Brøndby (Denmark)	1–4	(England) Everton
Kur Larsen 3'	Report	Williams 56' (pen.); Duggan 79'; Chaplen 81', 86'

Brøndby Stadium, Brøndby
Referee: Kateryna Monzul (Ukraine)
11 November 2010
20:00 (CET)

Everton (England)	1–1	(Denmark) Brøndby
Scott 71'	Report	Troelsgaard 11'

Stobart Halton, Widnes
Referee: Gyöngyi Gaál (Hungary)

Everton won 5–2 on aggregate.

3 November 2010
14:30 (CET)

Duisburg (Germany)	4–2	(Denmark) Fortuna Hjørring
Knaak 45'; Wensing 45+2'; Grings 56'; Islacker 82'	Report	Arnth Jensen 16'; Pedersen 54'

PCC-Stadion, Duisburg
Referee: Tanja Schett (Austria)
10 November 2010
17:00 (CET)

Fortuna Hjørring (Denmark)	0–3	(Germany) Duisburg
	Report	Weichelt 32', 47'; Islacker 89'

Hjørring Stadium, Hjørring
Referee: Christina Westrum Pedersen (Norway)

Duisburg won 7–2 on aggregate.

4 November 2010
12:00 (CET)

Torres (Italy)	1–2	(France) Juvisy
Pintus 74'	Report	Tonazzi 45'; Coquet 73'

Stadio Vanni Sanna, Sassari
Referee: Cristina Dorcioman (Romania)
10 November 2010
19:30 (CET)

Juvisy (France)	2–2 (a.e.t.)	(Italy) Torres
Tonazzi 12', 92'	Report	Iannella 60'; Fuselli 80'

Robert Bobin, Evry
Referee: Dagmar Damková (Czech Republic)

Juvisy won 4–3 on aggregate.

3 November 2010
14:00 (CET)

Turbine Potsdam (Germany)	7–0	(Austria) Neulengbach
Keßler 7'; Mittag 28', 77'; Zietz 58', 90+2'; Odebrecht 63'; Nagasato 65'	Report

Karl-Liebknecht-Stadion, Potsdam
Referee: Claudine Brohet (Belgium)
10 November 2010
19:00 (CET)

Neulengbach (Austria)	0–9	(Germany) Turbine Potsdam
	Report	Wesely 13'; Bajramaj 22', 25'; Zietz 45+2' (pen.); Nagasato 53', 71', 82'; Mittag 75'; Bagehorn 87'

Wienerwaldstadion, Neulengbach
Referee: Esther Staubli (Switzerland)

Turbine Potsdam won 16–0 on aggregate.

== Quarter-finals ==
The quarter final first ties were played on March 16 and 17, the second ties on March 23.

Team 1	Agg.	Team 2	1st leg	2nd leg
Zvezda 2005 Perm (Russia)	0–1	(France) Lyon	0–0	0–1
Arsenal (England)	(a) 3–3	(Sweden) Linköping	1–1	2–2
Everton (England)	2–5	(Germany) Duisburg	1–3	1–2
Juvisy (France)	2–9	(Germany) Turbine Potsdam	0–3	2–6

17 March 2011
15:00 (CET)

Zvezda 2005 Perm (Russia)	0–0	(France) Lyon
	Report

Zvezda Stadium, Perm
Attendance: 2,000
Referee: Silvia Tea Spinelli (Italy)
23 March 2011
19:00 (CET)

Lyon (France)	1–0	(Russia) Zvezda 2005 Perm
Dickenmann 60'	Report

Stade de Gerland, Lyon
Attendance: 6,200
Referee: Bibiana Steinhaus (Germany)

Lyon won 1–0 on aggregate.

17 March 2011
15:30 (CET)

Arsenal (England)	1–1	(Sweden) Linköping
E. White 66'	Report	Sällström 16'

Meadow Park, Borehamwood
Attendance: 286
Referee: Cristina Dorcioman (Romania)
23 March 2011
19:00 (CET)

Linköping (Sweden)	2–2	(England) Arsenal
Sällström 16'; Asllani 57'	Report	Yankey 40'; Chapman 79'

Kopparvallen, Åtvidaberg
Attendance: 1,921
Referee: Esther Staubli (Switzerland)

3–3 on aggregate. Arsenal won on away goals.

17 March 2011
20:00 (CET)

Everton (England)	1–3	(Germany) Duisburg
Dowie 60'	Report	Ando 52'; Popp 59', 65'

Stobart Halton, Widnes
Attendance: 704
Referee: Dagmar Damková (Czech Republic)
23 March 2011
15:00 (CET)

Duisburg (Germany)	2–1	(England) Everton
Laudehr 22'; Grings 79' (pen.)	Report	Harries 90+3'

PCC-Stadion, Duisburg
Attendance: 1,620
Referee: Jenny Palmqvist (Sweden)

Duisburg won 5–2 on aggregate.

16 March 2011
19:00 (CET)

Juvisy (France)	0–3	(Germany) Turbine Potsdam
	Report	Schmidt 8'; Bajramaj 28'; Soubeyrand 65' (o.g.)

Robert Bobin, Evry
Attendance: 2,487
Referee: Kateryna Monzul (Ukraine)
23 March 2011
19:00 (CET)

Turbine Potsdam (Germany)	6–2	(France) Juvisy
I. Kerschowski 18', 75'; Nagasato 31', 33'; Schmidt 45+1'; Mittag 62'	Report	Tonazzi 37'; Thiney 52'

Karl-Liebknecht-Stadion, Potsdam
Attendance: 2,350
Referee: Alexandra Ihringova (England)

Turbine Potsdam won 9–2 on aggregate.

== Semi-finals ==
Team 1	Agg.	Team 2	1st leg	2nd leg
Lyon (France)	5–2	(England) Arsenal	2–0	3–2
Duisburg (Germany)	2–3	(Germany) Turbine Potsdam	2–2	0–1

9 April 2011
18:00 (CET)

Lyon (France)	2–0	(England) Arsenal
Schelin 2', 11'	Report

Stade de Gerland, Lyon
Attendance: 20,123
Referee: Gyöngyi Gaál (Hungary)
16 April 2011
16:00 (CET)

Arsenal (England)	2–3	(France) Lyon
Fleeting 68'; E. White 85'	Report	Le Sommer 16', 34'; Dickenmann 45+1'

Meadow Park, Borehamwood
Attendance: 507
Referee: Christina Westrum Pedersen (Norway)

Lyon won 5–2 on aggregate.

9 April 2011
15:25 (CET)

Duisburg (Germany)	2–2	(Germany) Turbine Potsdam
Grings 32'; Oster 42'	Report	I. Kerschowski 16'; Nagasato 35'

PCC-Stadion, Duisburg
Attendance: 3,260
Referee: Cristina Dorcioman (Romania)
17 April 2011
14:15 (CET)

Turbine Potsdam (Germany)	1–0	(Germany) Duisburg
Nagasato 40'	Report

Karl-Liebknecht-Stadion, Potsdam
Attendance: 4,600
Referee: Kirsi Heikkinen (Finland)

Potsdam won 3–2 on aggregate.

== Final ==
26 May 2011
21:00 CEST

Lyon (France)	2–0	(Germany) Turbine Potsdam
Renard 27'; Dickenmann 85'	Report

Craven Cottage, London
Attendance: 14,303
Referee: Dagmar Damková (Czech Republic)
