= Linda Molin =

Linda Molin may refer to:

- Linda Molin (actress) (born 1992), Swedish actress
- Linda Molin (footballer) (born 1992), Swedish footballer
