= Nadia Benmokhtar =

Footballer and sports manager (born 1985)

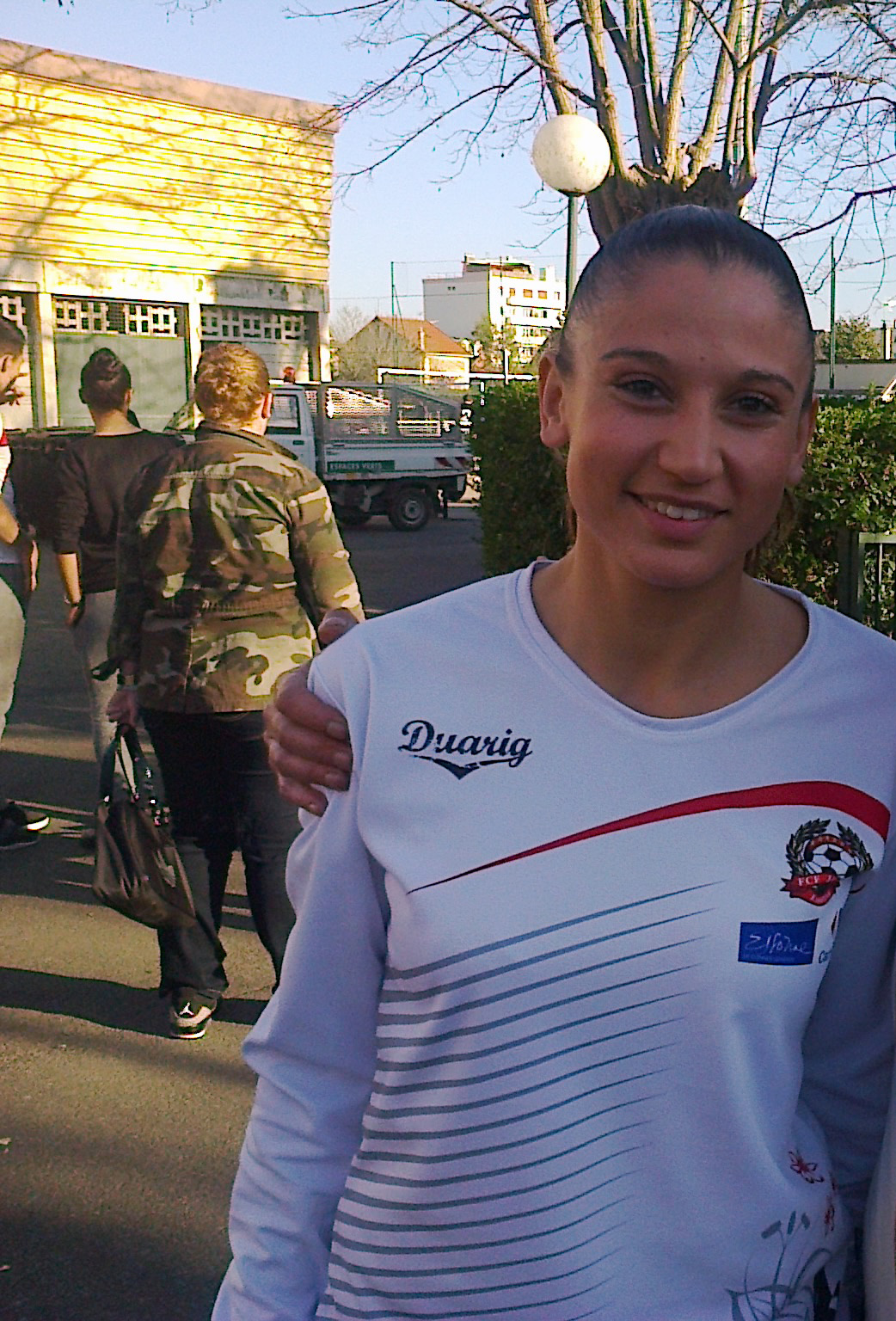
- Nadia Benmokhtar, 2014

Personal information
- Date of birth: 31 August 1985 (age 41)
- Place of birth: Paris, France
- Height: 1.70 m (5 ft 7 in)
- Position: Defender

Team information
- Current team: Paris Saint-Germain (diversification and merchandising director)

Youth career
- 2000–2002: VGA Saint-Maur
- 2002–2003: US Compiègne

Senior career*
Years	Team	Apps	(Gls)
2003–2008	US Compiègne	55	(1)
2008–2010	COM Bagneux	30	(0)
2010–2015	FCF Juvisy	42	(2)
Total		127	(3)

Managerial career
- 2009–2010: FFF (project coordinator)
- 2017–: Paris Saint-Germain (several positions)
- * Club domestic league appearances and goals

Nadia Benmokhtar (born 31 August 1985) is a French-Algerian association footballer and sports manager. She was a semi-professional player, pursuing a sporting career in the French women's Première Ligue.

After having retired from playing in 2015, she has embarked on a second career in sports management. Additionally, she has been active as football consultant and commentator across major French media outlets. In 2017, she was nominated General Director of the Paris Saint-Germain FC Youth Academy, and since 2021, she has been in charge of PSG's international brand and business development.

== Life and career ==
The daughter of a former professional player in Algeria, Benmokhtar began playing football at a very early age, obtaining her first licence at VGA Saint-Maur at the age of 7. She played for several years in the second French division as a defender, notably for Union Sportive de Compiègne and Club Olympique Multisport de Bagneux. Called up for the Algerian women's football team training camp for the 2014 African Cup of Nations, she did not join that competition.

Benmokhtar ended her active career in the French women's première ligue with FCF Juvisy Essonne (now Paris FC), a club managed by Sandrine Soubeyrand and captained by French international Gaëtane Thiney. For Juvisy, she played in the quarter final of the 2010–11 UEFA Women's Champions League and the semi-final in the 2013 UEFA Women's Champions League.

== Later career ==
=== Sports management ===
While still active as a football player, Benmokhtar graduated with an MBA in Marketing and Sport Management in 2008 at ISC Paris. Additionally, she obtained a Master in Event Management at the Université Paris-Sud. During the 2010s, she worked as project coordinator for the French Football Federation, as well as manager for sponsorship and corporate social responsibility for private companies. In 2020, she was named among 100 young talents in the French sports economy in the Choiseul ranking.

Between 2017 and 2021, Benmokhtar was in charge of the Paris Saint-Germain FC Youth Academy, which provides football training for girls and boys aged 3 to 17. Since 2021, she has been Head of Brand Development of the PSG brand and business projects on an international level. Thus, in August 2024, she was quoted saying that the PSG Academy will open a Football Academy the same year in Casablanca, Morocco.

=== Journalism ===
A former consultant for the 2019 Women's World Cup on France Bleu radio, she was a consultant for TF1/TMC television in Le Mag for the 2022 World Cup. During the Euro 2024 in Germany, she again worked as a consultant for TF1. As sports commentator for France Info, she has reported on football news, such as Luis Rubiales' unconsented kiss in 2023 and analysed the performance of the French national team, including players such as Kilian Mbappé and Karim Benzema.
