= 2010–11 UEFA Women's Champions League =

Tenth edition of the European women's club football championship organized by UEFA

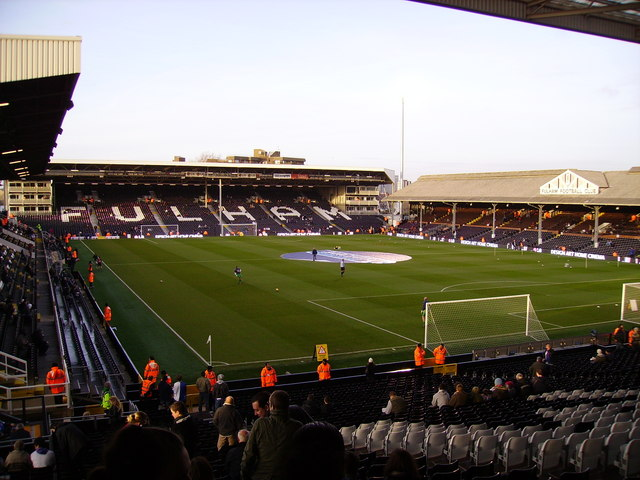
- Craven Cottage in London hosted the final.

Tournament details
- Dates: 5 August 2010 – 26 May 2011
- Teams: 51 (from 43 confederations)

Final positions
- Champions: (France) Olympique Lyon (1st title)
- Runners-up: (Germany) Turbine Potsdam

Tournament statistics
- Matches played: 103
- Goals scored: 473 (4.59 per match)
- Top scorer(s): (Germany) Inka Grings; 13 goals
- All statistics correct as of 26 May 2011.

The 2010–11 UEFA Women's Champions League was the tenth edition of the European women's championship for football clubs. The final was held in London, England on 26 May 2011 at Craven Cottage.

French side Olympique Lyon won the competition after finishing runner-up the previous year. Lyon became the first French team to win the competition.

== Team allocation and distribution ==
On 14 June 2010 UEFA announced the entry list. A total of 51 teams from 43 UEFA associations will participate. This is two less than in 2009–10, as the title holder Turbine Potsdam also qualified through its domestic league, and the winners of the Maltese league were not entered. Countries are allocated places according to their 2009 UEFA league coefficient for women, taking into account performances in women's club competitions between 2004–05 and 2008–09.

Associations 1–8 have two club qualify, the remaining associations have one team. Unlike the men's Champions League, not every association enters a team, and so the exact number of clubs in each round is only known shortly before the draw.

	Teams entering in this round	Teams advancing from previous round	Competition format
Qualifying round (28 teams)	8 domestic league runners-up from associations 1–8; 20 domestic league winners from associations ranked 24–53		7 groups of 4 clubs, hosted by one club, seeded into four pots by UEFA club
Round of 32 (32 teams)	23 domestic league winners from associations 1–23	7 group winners from qualifying round; 2 best group runners-up from qualifying round	Two-legged knockout, seeded by UEFA club coefficient

== Teams ==
Round of 32
(Germany) Turbine Potsdam (CH)	(Sweden) Linköping (CH)	(France) Lyon (CH)	(Russia) Zvezda 2005 Perm (CH)
(England) Arsenal (CH)	(Denmark) Fortuna Hjørring (CH)	(Italy) Torres (CH)	(Iceland) Valur (CH)
(Norway) Røa (CH)	(Spain) Rayo Vallecano (CH)	(Netherlands) AZ (CH)	(Belarus) Zorka-BDU Minsk (CH)
(Austria) Neulengbach (CH)	(Czech Republic) Sparta Praha (CH)	(Kazakhstan) CSHVSM (CH)	(Belgium) Sint-Truiden (CH)
(Poland) Unia Racibórz (CH)	(Switzerland) Zürich (CH)	(Ukraine) Lehenda-ShVSM (CH)	(Serbia) Mašinac Niš (CH)
(Finland) Åland United (CH)	(Hungary) MTK (CH)	(Greece) PAOK (CH)	
Qualifying round
(Germany) Duisburg (RU)	(Sweden) Umeå (RU)	(France) Juvisy (RU)	(Russia) Rossiyanka (RU)
(England) Everton (RU)	(Denmark) Brøndby (RU)	(Italy) Bardolino (RU)	(Iceland) Breiðablik (RU)
(Scotland) Glasgow City (CH)	(Romania) FCM Târgu Mureş (CH)	(Portugal) 1º Dezembro (CH)	(Bosnia and Herzegovina) SFK 2000 Sarajevo (CH)
(Israel) ASA Tel Aviv University (CH)	(Slovenia) Krka (CH)	(Bulgaria) NSA Sofia (CH)	(Moldova) FC Roma Calfa (CH)
(Lithuania) Gintra Universitetas (CH)	(Slovakia) Slovan Bratislava (CH)	(Wales) Swansea City (CH)	(Republic of Ireland) St Francis (CH)
(Croatia) Osijek (CH)	(Faroe Islands) KÍ Klaksvík (CH)	(Turkey) Gazi Üniversitesi (CH)	(North Macedonia) Borec Veles (CH)
(Northern Ireland) Crusaders Newtownabbey Strikers (CH)	(Cyprus) Apollon Limassol (CH)	(Estonia) Levadia Tallinn (CH)	(Georgia (country)) FC Baia Zugdidi (CH)

== Qualifying round ==
The draw was held on 23 June 2010. 28 teams enter in the qualifying round, and were divided into seven groups of four teams, with one team from each seeding pot:

Groups were played as mini tournaments over a span of six days.

=== Group 1 ===
Pos	Team	Pld	W	D	L	GF	GA	GD	Pts	Qualification	BRØ	NSA	RCA	GAZ
1	(Denmark) Brøndby (H)	3	3	0	0	21	0	+21	9	Advance to main round	—	–	6–0	12–0
2	(Bulgaria) NSA Sofia	3	2	0	1	11	3	+8	6		0–3	—	–	7–0
3	(Moldova) Roma Calfa	3	0	1	2	3	13	−10	1		–	0–4	—	–
4	(Turkey) Gazi Üniversitesi	3	0	1	2	3	22	−19	1		–	–	3–3	—

(H) Hosts

=== Group 2 ===
Pos	Team	Pld	W	D	L	GF	GA	GD	Pts	Qualification	EVE	GIN	KIK	BVE
1	(England) Everton	3	3	0	0	23	0	+23	9	Advance to main round	—	–	6–0	10–0
2	(Lithuania) Gintra Universitetas (H)	3	1	1	1	4	7	−3	4		0–7	—	–	4–0
3	(Faroe Islands) KÍ Klaksvík	3	1	1	1	2	6	−4	4		–	0–0	—	–
4	(North Macedonia) Borec Veles	3	0	0	3	0	16	−16	0		–	–	0–2	—

(H) Hosts

=== Group 3 ===
Pos	Team	Pld	W	D	L	GF	GA	GD	Pts	Qualification	APL	UME	ASA	2KS
1	(Cyprus) Apollon Limassol (H)	3	3	0	0	13	2	+11	9	Advance to main round	—	–	3–0	–
2	(Sweden) Umeå	3	2	0	1	5	4	+1	6		1–4	—	3–0	–
3	(Israel) ASA Tel Aviv University	3	1	0	2	3	7	−4	3		–	–	—	3–1
4	(Bosnia and Herzegovina) SFK Sarajevo	3	0	0	3	2	10	−8	0		1–6	0–1	–	—

(H) Hosts

=== Group 4 ===
Pos	Team	Pld	W	D	L	GF	GA	GD	Pts	Qualification	JUV	BRE	TMU	LTA
1	(France) Juvisy	3	2	1	0	20	4	+16	7	Advance to main round	—	–	5–1	12–0
2	(Iceland) Breiðablik (H)	3	2	1	0	18	4	+14	7	Advance to main round	3–3	—	–	8–1
3	(Romania) FCM Târgu Mureş	3	1	0	2	3	13	−10	3		–	0–7	—	–
4	(Estonia) Levadia Tallinn	3	0	0	3	2	22	−20	0		–	–	1–2	—

(H) Hosts

=== Group 5 ===
Pos	Team	Pld	W	D	L	GF	GA	GD	Pts	Qualification	BAR	KRK	SWA	BZU
1	(Italy) Bardolino	3	3	0	0	14	1	+13	9	Advance to main round	—	–	7–0	3–0
2	(Slovenia) Krka (H)	3	2	0	1	9	4	+5	6	Advance to main round	1–4	—	–	4–0
3	(Wales) Swansea City	3	1	0	2	2	12	−10	3		–	0–4	—	–
4	(Georgia (country)) Baia Zugdidi	3	0	0	3	1	9	−8	0		–	–	1–2	—

(H) Hosts

=== Group 6 ===
Pos	Team	Pld	W	D	L	GF	GA	GD	Pts	Qualification	ROS	SFR	DEZ	OSI
1	(Russia) Rossiyanka	3	3	0	0	18	1	+17	9	Advance to main round	—	9–0	–	5–0
2	(Republic of Ireland) St Francis	3	2	0	1	9	13	−4	6		–	—	–	5–3
3	(Portugal) 1º Dezembro	3	1	0	2	6	9	−3	3		1–4	1–4	—	–
4	(Croatia) Osijek (H)	3	0	0	3	4	14	−10	0		–	–	1–4	—

(H) Hosts

=== Group 7 ===
Pos	Team	Pld	W	D	L	GF	GA	GD	Pts	Qualification	DUI	GLA	SBR	CNS
1	(Germany) Duisburg	3	3	0	0	13	1	+12	9	Advance to main round	—	–	3–0	6–1
2	(Scotland) Glasgow City	3	2	0	1	12	4	+8	6		0–4	—	–	8–0
3	(Slovakia) Slovan Bratislava	3	1	0	2	1	7	−6	3		–	0–4	—	–
4	(Northern Ireland) Crusaders Newtownabbey Strikers (H)	3	0	0	3	1	15	−14	0		–	–	0–1	—

(H) Hosts

=== Ranking of group runners-up ===
The two best runners-up also qualify for the round of 32. The match against the fourth-placed team in the group does not count for the purposes of the runners-up table. The tie-breakers in this ranking are:

1. Higher number of points obtained
2. Superior goal difference
3. Higher number of goals scored
4. Higher number of club coefficient points
5. Fair play conduct in all group matches

Grp	Team	Pld	W	D	L	GF	GA	GD	Pts
4	(Iceland) Breiðablik	2	1	1	0	10	3	+7	4
5	(Slovenia) Krka	2	1	0	1	5	4	+1	3
1	(Bulgaria) NSA Sofia	2	1	0	1	4	3	+1	3
3	(Sweden) Umeå	2	1	0	1	4	4	0	3
7	(Scotland) Glasgow City	2	1	0	1	4	4	0	3
6	(Republic of Ireland) St Francis	2	1	0	1	4	10	−6	3
2	(Lithuania) Gintra Universitetas	2	0	1	1	0	7	−7	1

== Knockout phase ==
The draw for the round of 32 and round of 16 was held on 19 August 2010. The draw for the quarter-finals and onwards was made on 19 November 2010. The bracket has been created in retrospect.

=== Bracket ===
Round of 32
(Belarus) Zorka-BDU Minsk	1	0	1
(Norway) Røa	2	0	2
(Cyprus) Apollon Limassol	1	1	2
(Russia) Zvezda Perm	2	2	4
(Ukraine) Lehenda-ShVSM	1	0	1
(Russia) Rossiyanka	3	4	7
(Netherlands) AZ	1	0	1
(France) Lyon	2	8	10
(Spain) Rayo Vallecano	3	1	4
(Iceland) Valur	0	1	1
(Serbia) Mašinac Niš	1	0	1
(England) Arsenal	3	9	12
(Slovenia) Krka	0	0	0
(Sweden) Linköping	7	5	12
(Belgium) Sint-Truiden	0	0	0
(Czech Republic) Sparta Prague	3	7	10
(Poland) Unia Racibórz	1	1	2
(Denmark) Brøndby (a)	2	0	2
(Hungary) MTK Hungária	0	1	1
(England) Everton	0	7	7
(Kazakhstan) CSHVSM	0	0	0
(Germany) Duisburg	5	6	11
(Denmark) Fortuna	8	6	14
(Italy) Bardolino	0	1	1
(Switzerland) Zürich	2	1	3
(Italy) Torres	3	4	7
(Iceland) Breiðablik	0	0	0
(France) Juvisy	3	6	9
(Finland) Åland United	0	0	0
(Germany) Turbine Potsdam	9	6	15
(Greece) PAOK	1	0	1
(Austria) Neulengbach	0	3	3

Round of 16
(Norway) Røa	1	0	1
(Russia) Zvezda Perm	1	4	5
(Russia) Rossiyanka	1	0	1
(France) Lyon	6	5	11
(Spain) Rayo Vallecano	2	1	3
(England) Arsenal	0	4	4
(Sweden) Linköping	2	1	3
(Czech Republic) Sparta Prague	0	0	0
(Denmark) Brøndby	1	1	2
(England) Everton	4	1	5
(Germany) Duisburg	4	3	7
(Denmark) Fortuna	2	0	2
(Italy) Torres	1	2	3
(France) Juvisy (a.e.t.)	2	2	4
(Germany) Turbine Potsdam	7	9	16
(Austria) Neulengbach	0	0	0

Quarter-finals
(Russia) Zvezda Perm	0	0	0
(France) Lyon	0	1	1
(England) Arsenal (a)	1	2	3
(Sweden) Linköping	1	2	3
(England) Everton	1	1	2
(Germany) Duisburg	3	2	5
(France) Juvisy	0	2	2
(Germany) Turbine Potsdam	3	6	9

Semi-finals
(France) Lyon	2	3	5
(England) Arsenal	0	2	2
(Germany) Duisburg	2	0	2
(Germany) Turbine Potsdam	2	1	3

Final
(France) Lyon	2
(Germany) Turbine Potsdam	0

=== Round of 32 ===
16 teams are seeded in this round, and play the second leg at home. Teams from the same association may not play each other. The first leg is scheduled for the week of 22 September 2010, the second leg for the week of 13 October 2010. The draw was made on 19 August 2010.

Team 1	Agg.	Team 2	1st leg	2nd leg
Zorka-BDU Minsk (Belarus)	1–2	(Norway) Røa	1–2	0–0
Apollon Limassol (Cyprus)	2–4	(Russia) Zvezda 2005 Perm	1–2	1–2
Lehenda-ShVSM (Ukraine)	1–7	(Russia) Rossiyanka	1–3	0–4
AZ (Netherlands)	1–10	(France) Lyon	1–2	0–8
Rayo Vallecano (Spain)	4–1	(Iceland) Valur	3–0	1–1
Mašinac Niš (Serbia)	1–12	(England) Arsenal	1–3	0–9
Krka (Slovenia)	0–12	(Sweden) Linköping	0–7	0–5
Sint-Truiden (Belgium)	0–10	(Czech Republic) Sparta Prague	0–3	0–7
Unia Racibórz (Poland)	2–2 (a)	(Denmark) Brøndby	1–2	1–0
MTK (Hungary)	1–7	(England) Everton	0–0	1–7
SSHVSM (Kazakhstan)	0–11	(Germany) Duisburg	0–5	0–6
Fortuna Hjørring (Denmark)	14–1	(Italy) Bardolino	8–0	6–1
Zürich (Switzerland)	3–7	(Italy) Torres	2–3	1–4
Breiðablik (Iceland)	0–9	(France) Juvisy	0–3	0–6
Åland United (Finland)	0–15	(Germany) Turbine Potsdam	0–9	0–6
PAOK (Greece)	1–3	(Austria) Neulengbach	1–0	0–3

=== Round of 16 ===
The draws for this and all subsequent rounds are not seeded, and clubs from the same association may play each other. This round is scheduled for the week of 3 November and the week of 10 November 2010.

Team 1	Agg.	Team 2	1st leg	2nd leg
Røa (Norway)	1–5	(Russia) Zvezda 2005 Perm	1–1	0–4
Rossiyanka (Russia)	1–11	(France) Lyon	1–6	0–5
Rayo Vallecano (Spain)	3–4	(England) Arsenal	2–0	1–4
Linköping (Sweden)	3–0	(Czech Republic) Sparta Prague	2–0	1–0
Brøndby (Denmark)	2–5	(England) Everton	1–4	1–1
Duisburg (Germany)	7–2	(Denmark) Fortuna Hjørring	4–2	3–0
Torres (Italy)	3–4	(France) Juvisy	1–2	2–2 (a.e.t.)
Turbine Potsdam (Germany)	16–0	(Austria) Neulengbach	7–0	9–0

=== Quarter-finals ===
The quarter final first ties were played on March 16 and 17, the second ties on March 23.

Team 1	Agg.	Team 2	1st leg	2nd leg
Zvezda 2005 Perm (Russia)	0–1	(France) Lyon	0–0	0–1
Arsenal (England)	(a) 3–3	(Sweden) Linköping	1–1	2–2
Everton (England)	2–5	(Germany) Duisburg	1–3	1–2
Juvisy (France)	2–9	(Germany) Turbine Potsdam	0–3	2–6

=== Semi-finals ===
Team 1	Agg.	Team 2	1st leg	2nd leg
Lyon (France)	5–2	(England) Arsenal	2–0	3–2
Duisburg (Germany)	2–3	(Germany) Turbine Potsdam	2–2	0–1

=== Final ===
26 May 2011
21:00 CEST

Lyon (France)	2–0	(Germany) Turbine Potsdam
Renard 27'; Dickenmann 85'	Report

Craven Cottage, London
Attendance: 14,303
Referee: Dagmar Damková (Czech Republic)

== Top goalscorers ==
The top goal scorers with the qualifying round excluded are:

Rank	Name	Team	Goals	Appearances	Minutes played
1	(Germany) Inka Grings	(Germany) Duisburg	11	7	630'
2	(Japan) Yuki Nagasato	(Germany) Turbine Potsdam	9	8	600'
	(Sweden) Lotta Schelin	(France) Lyon	9	9	745'
4	(Germany) Anja Mittag	(Germany) Turbine Potsdam	8	9	708'
5	(Denmark) Cathrine Paaske-Sørensen	(Denmark) Fortuna Hjørring	7	4	360'
6	(France) Eugénie Le Sommer	(France) Lyon	5	9	382'
	(England) Brooke Chaplen	(England) Everton	5	6	439'
	(France) Laëtitia Tonazzi	(France) Juvisy	5	6	567'
	(Switzerland) Lara Dickenmann	(France) Lyon	5	9	617'
	(Germany) Fatmire Bajramaj	(Germany) Turbine Potsdam	5	8	691'

== Round and draw dates ==
UEFA has scheduled the competition as follows.

Round	Draw	First leg	Second leg
Qualifying round	23 June 2010	5–10 August 2010	
Round of 32	19 August 2010	22–23 September 2010	13–14 October 2010
Round of 16	19 August 2010	3–4 November 2010	10–11 November 2010
Quarter-final	19 November 2010	16–17 March 2011	23–24 March 2011
Semi-final	19 November 2010	9–10 April 2011	16–17 April 2011
Final	19 November 2010	26 May 2011	
