= Martine Combes =

French footballer (born 1969)

Personal information
- Date of birth: 21 March 1969 (age 57)
- Position: Defender

Senior career*
Years	Team	Apps	(Gls)
1992–2004	FCF Juvisy		

International career
1994	France	5	(1)
- * Club domestic league appearances and goals

Martine Combes is a retired French professional footballer who played as a defender for French club FCF Juvisy and the France national team.

== International career ==
Combes represented France 5 times and scored 1 goal.
