= Saki Ishizaka =

Japanese footballer (born 2003)

Saki Ishizaka 石坂 咲樹
Personal information
- Date of birth: 24 April 2003 (age 23)
- Height: 1.61 m (5 ft 3 in)
- Position: Defender

Team information
- Current team: Paris FC
- Number: 23

Youth career
- Teraoka Gallants
- 2019–2021: Mynavi Sendai
- 2022–2023: Musashigaoka College

Senior career*
Years	Team	Apps	(Gls)
2023–2026	Mynavi Sendai	50	(5)
2026–	Paris FC	0	(0)
- * Club domestic league appearances and goals as of 04:09, 23 July 2026 (UTC)

Saki Ishizaka (石坂 咲樹, Ishizaka Saki; born 24 April 2003) is a Japanese professional footballer who plays as a defender for Première Ligue club Paris FC. She has previously played domestically for WE League club Mynavi Sendai.

== Youth career ==
Ishizaka grew up in Sendai, Japan. She began playing football in elementary school, alongside her older brother. She soon joined local youth club Teraoka Gallants before moving to Mynavi Sendai's youth program in 2019. In her third year at Mynavi Sendai, she helped the club reach the finals of the national youth women's soccer tournament. At the end of her academy career, Ishizaka was not able to win a spot on Sendai's top-flight team. She was nevertheless a member of the club's first-ever academy graduating class.

After discovering that she would not be able to join Mynavi Sendai's professional squad, Ishizaka was reached out to by the coach of Musashigaoka College's team. She then spent two years playing collegiately in the Japanese second division.

== Club career ==
In 2023, Ishizaka re-joined her hometown team Mynavi Sendai, this time as a specially designated player on the club's WE League squad. On 10 December 2023, she recorded her first professional start and goal in a 2–1 victory over RB Omiya Ardija. In the second half of the 2023–24 season, Ishizaka joined Mynavi Sendai as a full member of the squad. She went on to spend two more seasons with the club, totaling 62 appearances in all competitions. In the 2025–26 campaign, she was shifted from a more attacking position to left-back after an injury to Rio Sasaki opened up an opportunity. In the twelfth match of that season, Ishizaka scored directly from a free kick in the 89th minute of a match against Albirex Niigata to nab a 2–1 win for Sendai.

On 18 July 2026, Ishizaka was announced to have signed for French club Paris FC on a three-year deal lasting until 2029.

== Personal life ==
Ishizaka's education at Musashigaoka College earned her accreditation as a registered dietitian and certified general health management instructor.

== Career statistics ==
=== Club ===
As of 22 July 2026

Appearances and goals by club, season and competition
Club	Season	League			National cup (Note: Includes Empress's Cup)		League cup (Note: Includes WE League Cup)		Total	
Club	Season	Division	Apps	Goals	Apps	Goals	Apps	Goals	Apps	Goals
Mynavi Sendai	2023–24	WE League	17	2	—		—		17	2
Mynavi Sendai	2024–25	WE League	15	2	1	0	3	0	19	2
Mynavi Sendai	2025–26	WE League	18	1	2	0	6	1	26	2
Mynavi Sendai	Total		50	5	3	0	9	1	62	6
Paris FC	2026–27	Première Ligue	0	0	0	0	—		0	0
Career total			50	5	3	0	9	1	62	6
