= Julie Rabanne =

French footballer (born 1989)

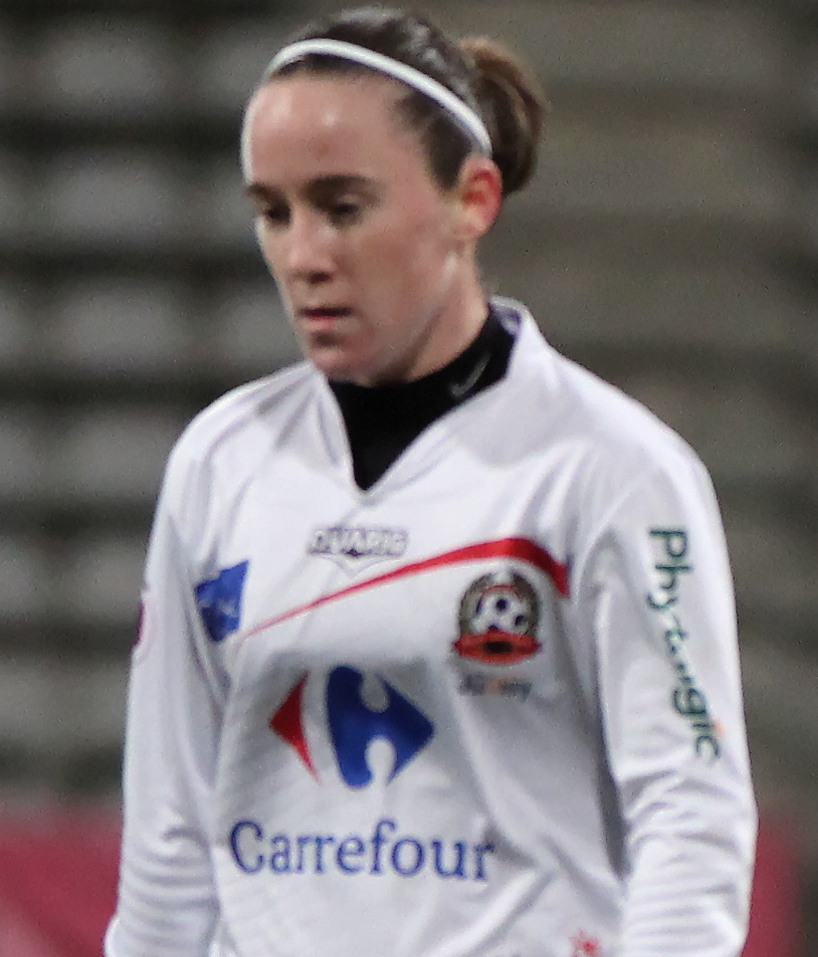
- Machart with Juvisy in 2012

Personal information
- Full name: Julie Machart-Rabanne
- Birth name: Julie Machart
- Date of birth: 18 April 1989 (age 37)
- Place of birth: Saint-Omer, France
- Height: 1.54 m (5 ft 1 in)
- Position: Forward

Team information
- Current team: Nantes
- Number: 17

Senior career*
Years	Team	Apps	(Gls)
2005–2007	CNFE Clairefontaine	11	(2)
2007–2009	Gravelines	48	(43)
2009–2015	Juvisy	149	(63)
2016	Lille	11	(13)
2016–2020	Fleury	78	(22)
2020–2022	Issy	38	(2)
2022–2024	Lille	44	(16)
2024–	Nantes	15	(2)

International career
2005–2007	France U17	10	(0)
2007–2009	France U19	8	(2)
2008–2009	France	7	(2)
- * Club domestic league appearances and goals as of 15 February 2025

Julie Rabanne (born Julie Machart, 18 April 1989), also known as Julie Machart and Julie Machart-Rabanne, is a French footballer who plays as a striker for Nantes.

== Career ==
On 22 June 2022, Rabanne was announced at Lille. On 22 June 2023, Rabanne signed a two year contract extension with Lille.

On 26 July 2024, Rabanne joined FC Nantes.
