= Linda Molin (footballer) =

Swedish footballer

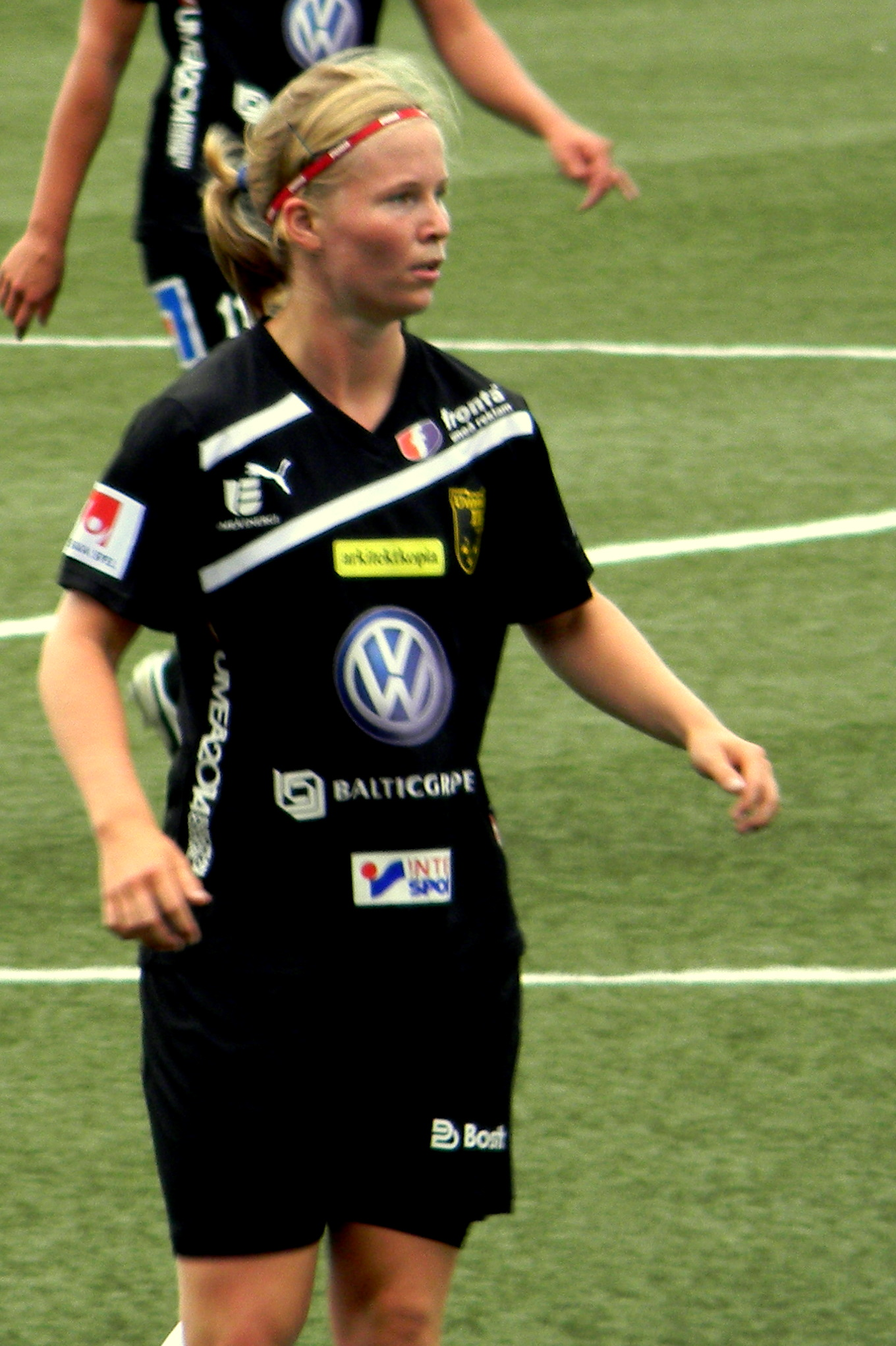
- Linda Molin in 2011

Personal information
- Full name: Linda Marie Molin
- Date of birth: 6 May 1992 (age 34)
- Place of birth: Domsjö, Örnsköldsvik, Sweden
- Position: Midfielder

Senior career*
Years	Team	Apps	(Gls)
2010–2011	Umeå IK	19	(1)
2011	Umeå Södra FF	2	(0)
2011–2012	Umeå IK	30	(4)

International career^{‡}
2012	Sweden U19	2	(0)
- * Club domestic league appearances and goals as of 20:38, 23 May 2016 (UTC) ‡ National team caps and goals as of 20:38, 23 May 2016 (UTC)

Linda Molin (born 6 May 1992) in Domsjö, Örnsköldsvik, Sweden is a Swedish footballer who played for Umeå IK. She was signed for the club shortly prior to her 18th birthday. She also played for the Sweden women's national under-19 football team, first being called up to the team in 2011.
