= Morag Pirie =

Scottish football referee

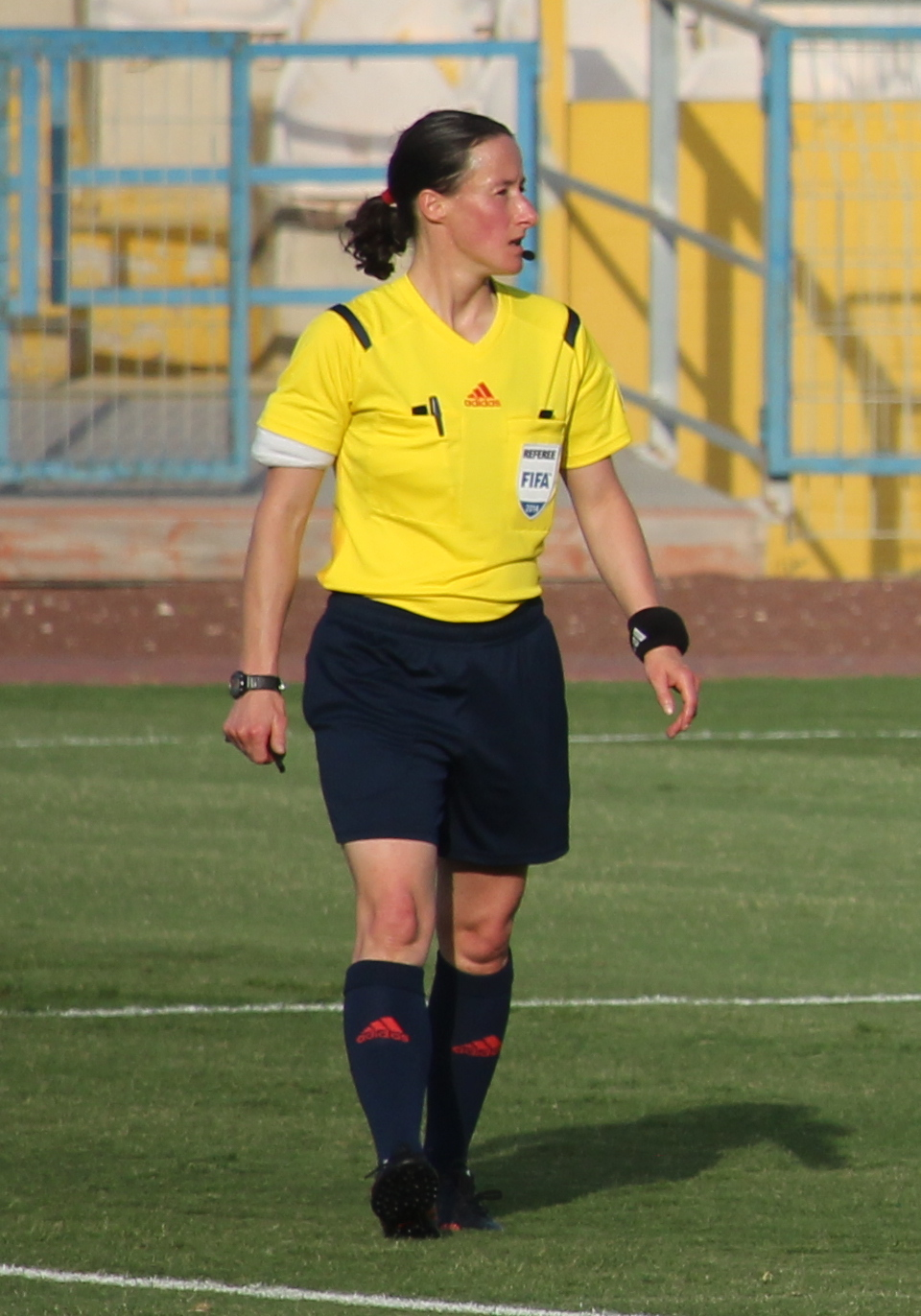
- Full name: Morag Pirie
- Born: 27 June 1975 (age 51); Aberdeen, Scotland
- Other occupation: Accountant

Domestic
Years	League	Role
2004–	FIFA	Referee

Morag Pirie (born 27 June 1975) is a Scottish association football referee and accountant. She is Scotland's first female FIFA referee, having been appointed to FIFA's Elite Development Level in 2012.

== Early life ==
A lifelong football fan, Pirie played as a goalkeeper for Aberdeen University and Scottish Universities teams, later joining club side Aberdeen Accies. In the late 1990s, while Pirie was taking a football coaching course, she helped referee a children's football tournament in Aberdeen, and subsequently decided to apply for a refereeing course, which she passed. She started refereeing after graduating from university and gave up playing football at age 24 to focus on refereeing.

== Career ==
By 2001, Pirie was one of 40 women officials registered with the Scottish Football Association, and the only woman officiating at senior level.

In August 2003 Pirie became the first woman to referee a senior football match in Scotland, when she took charge of Huntly's 1–0 win over Wick Academy at Christie Park in the Highland Football League. In November 2003 Albion Rovers manager Peter Hetherston was put on a charge for criticising Pirie's performance running the line in Rovers' defeat to Montrose.

In July 2005, Pirie was appointed as an assistant referee for a UEFA Champions League qualifying match. The following year she was an assistant referee at the UEFA Women's U-19 Championship.

Pirie became the first woman to officiate at a national cup final in November 2007, when she was an assistant referee at the 2007 Scottish Challenge Cup Final. In 2012, she became the first Scottish woman to reach FIFA's elite development level.

In 2017, Pirie achieved Guiness World Record status as part of a team of match officials who refereed the highest ever football match at the summit of Mount Kilimanjaro as part of an initiative to highlight the inequality faced by women in sport.
