= Paris FC (women) =

Women's association football club

- Full name: Paris Football Club Féminines
- Founded: 1971 as ES Juvisy-sur-Orge; 1985 as FCF Juvisy Essonne; 2017 as Paris FC
- Ground: Stade Sébastien Charléty, Paris (D1); Stade Jean-Bouin, Paris (UWCL)
- Capacity: 19,151 (Stade Charléty); 19,607 (Stade Jean-Bouin)
- President: Marie-Christine Terroni
- Manager: Sandrine Soubeyrand
- League: Première Ligue
- 2025–26: Première Ligue, 2nd of 12
- Website: https://parisfc.fr/
Home colours	Away colours

Paris FC is a French women's football club based in Paris. The club was founded in 1971 and currently play in the Première Ligue, the first division of women's football in France. The club has played in the first division since 1987.

Paris FC was founded in 1971 as Étoile Sportive de Juvisy-sur-Orge, the women's football section of local club ES Juvisy, based in Juvisy-sur-Orge. After 14 years, the section split from the club, formed its own club under the name Football Club Féminin Juvisy Essonne and moved to the commune of Viry-Châtillon. Despite moving from Juvisy-sur-Orge, the women's club retained the name FCF Juvisy amid financial backing and support from the commune and the General Council of Essonne. In the 1991–92 season, Juvisy won its first ever Division 1 Féminine championship. Between 1994 and 2003, the club won four league titles and later won a Challenge de France title in 2005 making Juvisy one of the most successful clubs in women's French football. Juvisy was a regular participant in the UEFA Women's Cup and, in the 2010–11 season, made its first appearance in the re-branded UEFA Women's Champions League. On 6 July 2017, FCF Juvisy was sold to Paris FC as its women's section and moved from an amateur structure to a full-time professional setup.

The club is managed by Sandrine Soubeyrand, who is the all-time leader in caps by a French international and made more than 200 appearances for Juvisy. Other notable players include Marinette Pichon, who was the women's national team all-time leading goalscorer, and Gaëtane Thiney, the club's appearance record holder.

== Record in UEFA competitions ==
All results (away, home and aggregate) list Juvisy's goal tally first.

Season	Round	Club	Away	Home	Aggregate	Scorers
2003–2004	Second qualifying round	(Republic of Ireland) UCD	6–1			Bourdille-Mendes 2, Tonazzi 2, Perraudeau
2003–2004	Second qualifying round	(Poland) Wrocław	3–0			Soubeyrand 2, Guilbert
2003–2004	Second qualifying round	(Norway) Kolbotn (Host)	1–2			Perraudeau
2006–2007	First qualifying round	(Faroe Islands) Klaksvík	6–0			Pichon 2, Gwenaëlle Butel, Lacroix, Moresco, Tonazzi
2006–2007	First qualifying round	(Spain) Espanyol Barcelona	0–1			
2006–2007	First qualifying round	(Scotland) Hibernian Edinburgh (Host)	6–0			Tonazzi 3, Pichon 2, Lacroix
2010–2011	Qualifying round	(Romania) Târgu Mureș	5–1			Tonazzi 3, Lebailly, Trimoreau
2010–2011	Qualifying round	(Estonia) Levadia Tallinn	12–0			Machart 4, Lebailly 2, Pourtalet 2, Bourdille-Mendes, Fernandes, Soubeyrand, Thiney
2010–2011	Qualifying round	(Iceland) Breiðablik Kópavogur (Host)	3–3			Bourdille-Mendes, Coquet, Machart
2010–2011	Round of 32	(Iceland) Breiðablik Kópavogur	3–0 ^{f}	6–0	9–0	Soubeyrand, Thiney 2, Tonazzi 2, Machart 3, Coquet
2010–2011	Round of 16	(Italy) Torres Sassari	2–1 ^{f}	2–2 a.e.t.	4–3	Tonazzi 3, Coquet
2010–2011	Quarter-final	(Germany) Turbine Potsdam	2–6	0–3 ^{f}	2–9	Tonazzi, Thiney
2012–2013	Round of 32	(Switzerland) FC Zürich	1–1 ^{f}	1–0	2–1	Thiney 2
2012–2013	Round of 16	(Norway) Stabæk Bærum	0–0 ^{f}	2–1	2–1	Cayman, Soubeyrand
2012–2013	Quarter-final	(Sweden) Kopparbergs/Göteborg	3–1	1–0 ^{f}	4–1	Machart, Catala 2, Cayman
2012–2013	Semi-final	(France) Olympique Lyon	0–3 ^{f}	1–6	1–9	Diani
2022–23	Qualifying round 1 SF	(Switzerland) Servette	3–0			Matéo 2
2022–23	Qualifying round 1 F	(Italy) Roma	0–0 a.e.t. (4–5p)			
2023–24	Qualifying round 1 SF	(Ukraine) Kryvbas Kryvyi Rih	4–0			Dufour 3, Korošec
2023–24	Qualifying round 1 F	(England) Arsenal	3–3 a.e.t. (4–2p)			Bourdieu 2, Fleury
2023–24	Qualifying round 2	(Germany) VfL Wolfsburg	2–0	3–3 ^{f}	5–3	Dufour 2, Fleury, Thiney, Bourdieu
2023–24	Group stage	(Spain) Real Madrid	1–0	2–1 ^{f}	3rd	Dufour 2, Gréboval, Thiney 2
2023–24	Group stage	(England) Chelsea	1–4 ^{f}	0–4	3rd	Dufour 2, Gréboval, Thiney 2
2023–24	Group stage	(Sweden) BK Häcken	0–0	1–2 ^{f}	3rd	Dufour 2, Gréboval, Thiney 2
2024–25	Qualifying round 1 SF	(Austria) First Vienna	9–0			Bourdieu 3, Dufour 2, Thiney, Bussy 2, Corboz
2024–25	Qualifying round 1 F	(Czech Republic) Sparta Prague	2–0			Matéo, Korošec
2024–25	Qualifying round 2	(England) Manchester City	0–3	0–5 ^{f}	0–8	

^{f} First leg.

== Rivalries ==
The Parisians share a strong rivalry with Paris Saint-Germain. Known as the Parisian Derby, the two teams compete for recognition as the capital's top team. Prior to the rise of PSG into an elite club in the 2010s, Paris FC were the biggest team in the land and usually had the upper hand against their city rivals. In fact, PFC were the last side to win the league title, in 2006, before Lyon won 14 consecutive championships, that run being halted when PSG claimed their first crown in 2021. Nowadays, PSG dominate the derby thanks to the huge gulf created between them by the investment of their Qatari owners, while Paris FC are trying to establish themselves as France's third team.

== Players ==
=== Current squad ===
As of 12 August 2026

Note: Flags indicate national team as defined under FIFA eligibility rules; some limited exceptions apply. Players may hold more than one non-FIFA nationality.

No.	Pos.	Nation	Player
2	DF	ALG	Célina Ould Hocine
3	DF	ECU	Manoly Baquerizo
4	MF	SLO	Kaja Korošec
5	DF	FRA	Hillary Diaz
7	FW	BEL	Mariam Toloba
8	MF	FRA	Daphne Corboz
9	FW	FRA	Kadidia Traoré
10	FW	FRA	Clara Mateo
11	FW	CRC	Sheika Scott
14	FW	CAN	Evelyne Viens
15	FW	FRA	Hawa Sangaré
16	GK	FRA	Mylène Chavas
18	DF	FRA	Melween N'Dongala
19	DF	FRA	Théa Greboval

No.	Pos.	Nation	Player
20	FW	POL	Klaudia Jedlińska
21	MF	FRA	Océane Picard
22	GK	POL	Kinga Seweryn
23	DF	JPN	Saki Ishizaka
24	MF	FRA	Anaële Le Moguédec
25	MF	COL	Karla Torres
26	DF	FRA	Fiona Liaigre
27	MF	FRA	Maeline Mendy
28	MF	FRA	Odélia Tae
30	GK	POR	Rafaela Mendonça
31	MF	FRA	Kenza Roche-Dufour
33	DF	MAR	Hajar Saïd
34	FW	BEL	Aurélie Reynders
77	MF	FRA	Sharlie Yerro

=== Out on loan ===
Note: Flags indicate national team as defined under FIFA eligibility rules; some limited exceptions apply. Players may hold more than one non-FIFA nationality.

No.	Pos.	Nation	Player
1	GK	FRA	Inès Marques (at US Saint-Malo until 30 June 2027)
9	FW	FRA	Lorena Azzaro (at Charlton Athletic until 30 June 2027)

=== Former notable players ===
- Eseosa Aigbogun
- Nadia Benmokhtar
- Sarah Bouhaddi
- Élise Bussaglia
- Annaïg Butel
- Camille Catala
- Martine Combes
- Kadidiatou Diani
- Sandrine Fusier
- Nelly Guilbert
- Oriane Jean-François
- Stéphanie Mugneret-Béghé
- Marinette Pichon
- Ouleymata Sarr
- Sandrine Soubeyrand
- Gaëtane Thiney
- Élisa De Almeida

== Current staff ==
As of 18 February 2024.

Position	Name
Head coach	(France) Sandrine Soubeyrand
Assistant coach	(France) Kévin Boquet
Goalkeeper coach	(France) Paul Bertandeau
Team Manager	(France) Camille Stassin
Assistant Team Manager	(France) Lucas Alves
Doctor	(France) Etienne James-Belin
Physiotherapists	(France) Thomas Picard
Physiotherapists	(France) Quentin Laigle
Osteopath	(France) Daniel Bontems
Strength and Conditioning Coach	(France) Maxence Pieulhet
Video Analyst	(France) Alexandre Komorowski

== Honours ==
=== Domestic ===
- Division 1 Féminine
  - Winners (6): 1991–92, 1993–94, 1995–96, 1996–97, 2002–03, 2005–06
- Coupe de France
  - Winners (2): 2004–05, 2024–25

=== European ===
- UEFA Women's Champions League
  - Semi-finalists: 2012–13

=== Invitation ===
- Menton Tournament
  - Winners (1): 1993

== National competition record ==
Season	Division	Place	Coupe de France	Top scorer/s
1980–81	2 (Gr. A)	?		
1981–82	2 (Gr. A)	?		
1982–83	1 (Gr. C)	3rd		
1983–84	1 (Gr. C)	2nd		
1984–85	1 (Gr. C)	5th		
1985–86	1	2nd		
1986–87	1 (Gr. F)	4th		
1987–88	1 (Gr. A)	4th		
1988–89	1 (Gr. A)	3rd		
1989–90	1	3rd		
1990–91	1	3rd		
1991–92	1	1st		
1992–93	1	2nd		
1993–94	1	1st		
1994–95	1	3rd		
1995–96	1	1st		
1996–97	1	1st		
1997–98	1	2nd		
1998–99	1	3rd		
1999–00	1	2nd		
2000–01	1	2nd		
2001–02	1	2nd	Semifinals	(14) Tonazzi
2002–03	1	1st	Semifinals	(16) Mugneret, Provost, Tonazzi
2003–04	1	3rd	Quarterfinals	(14) Tonazzi
2004–05	1	2nd	Champion	(38) Pichon
2005–06	1	1st	Semifinals	(36) Pichon
2006–07	1	3rd	Round of 16	(16) Tonazzi
2007–08	1	2nd	Semifinals	(22) Tonazzi
2008–09	1	3rd	Semifinals	(15) Tonazzi
2009–10	1	2nd	Semifinals	(12) Tonazzi
2010–11	1	4th	Semifinals	(20) Tonazzi
2011–12	1	2nd	Round of 16	(14) Thiney
2012–13	1	3rd	Round of 16	(13) Thiney
2013–14	1	3rd	Semifinals	(25) Thiney

== Gallery ==
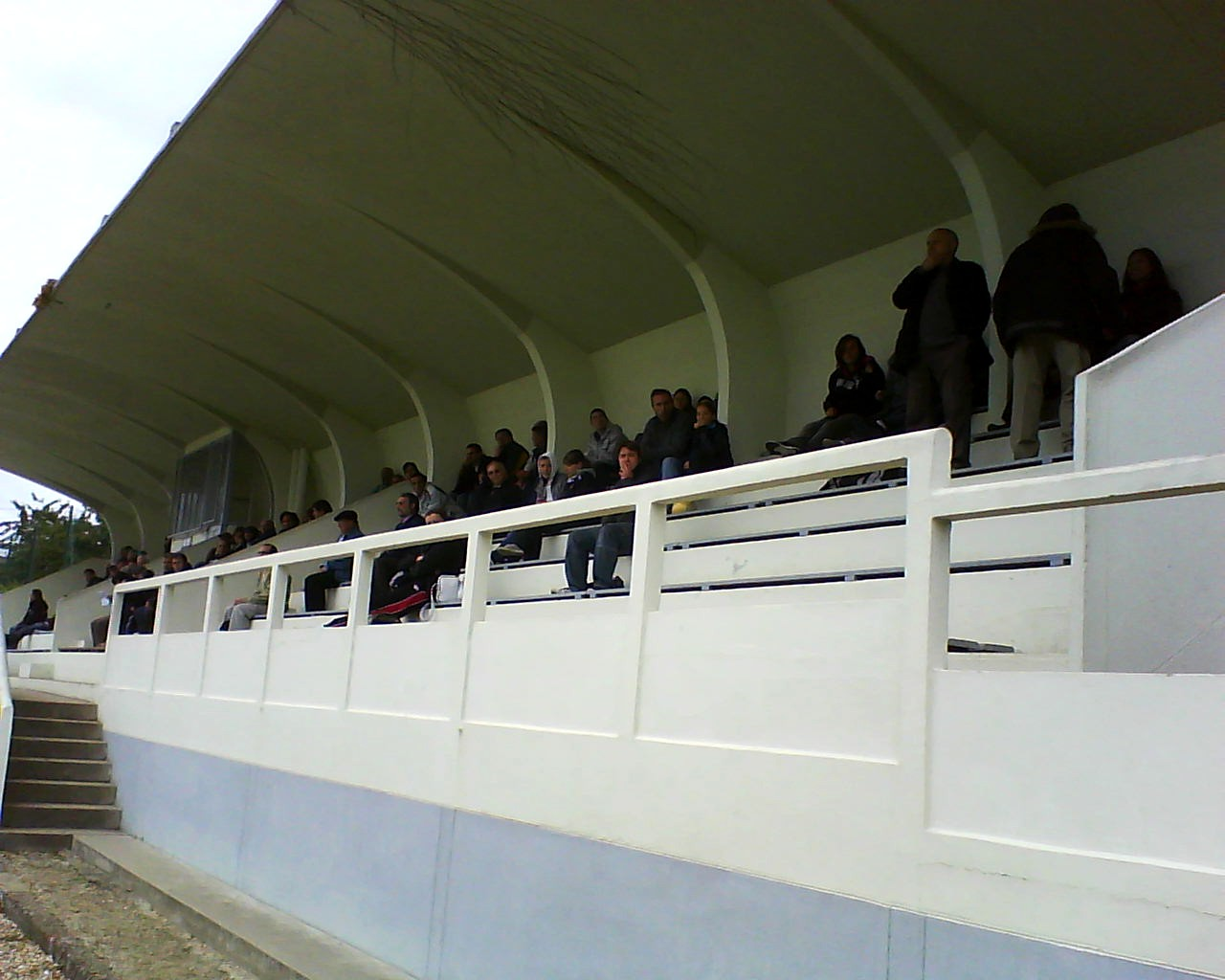
Juvisy's Stadium

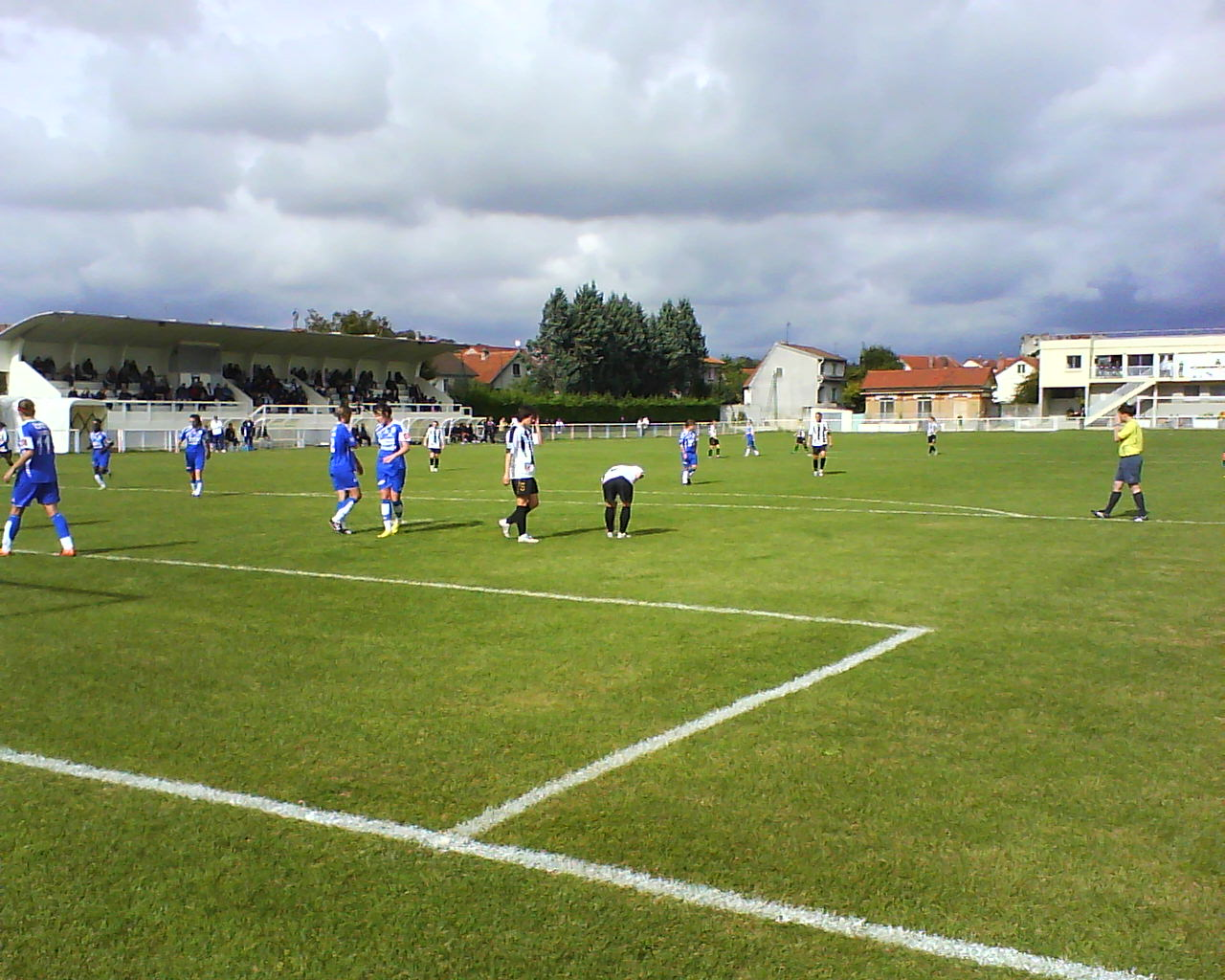
FCF Juvisy - FF Yzeure
(26 September 2010)

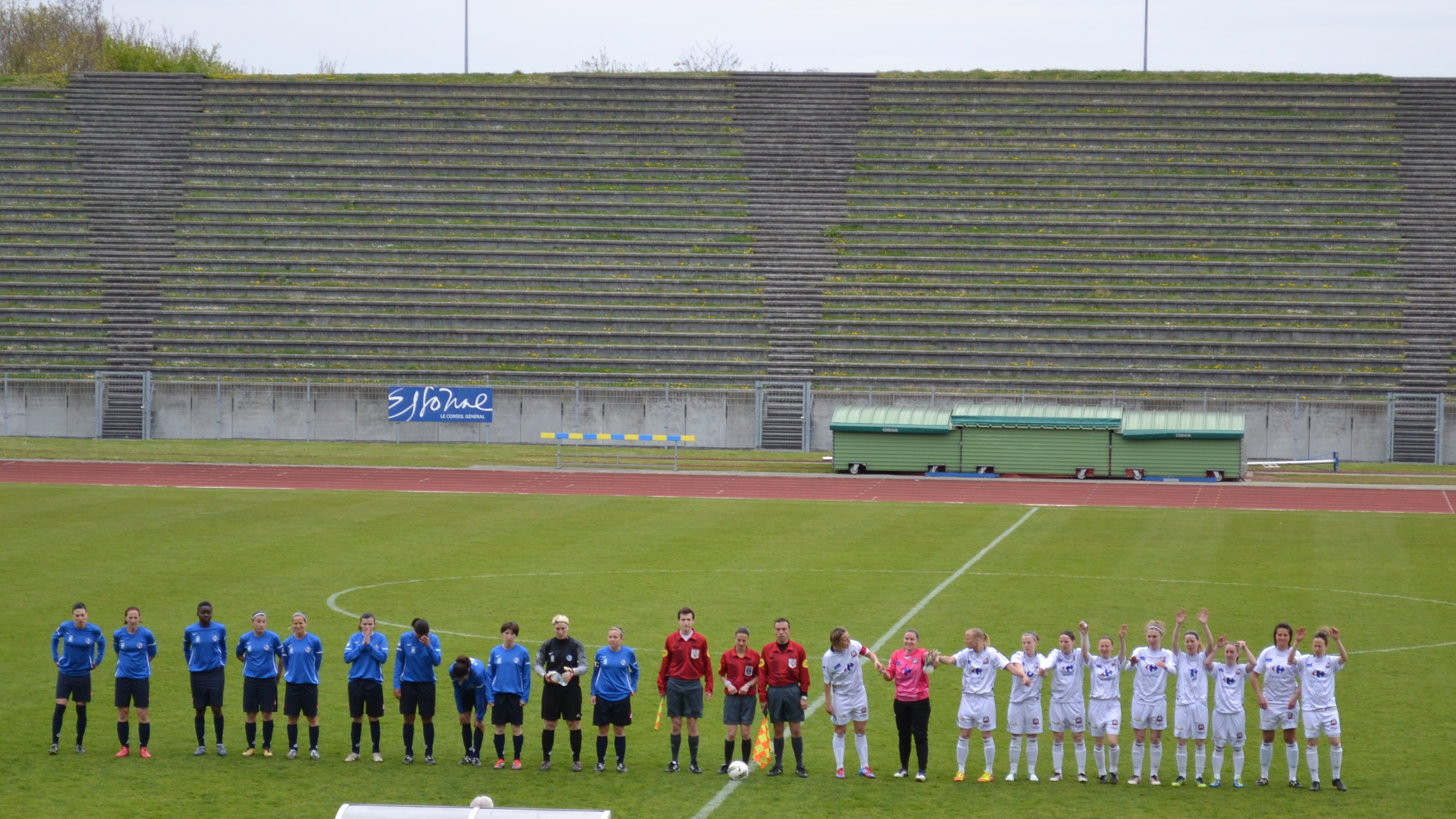
FCF Juvisy - AS Muretaine
(8 April 2012)
