= Laëtitia Tonazzi =

French footballer (born 1981)

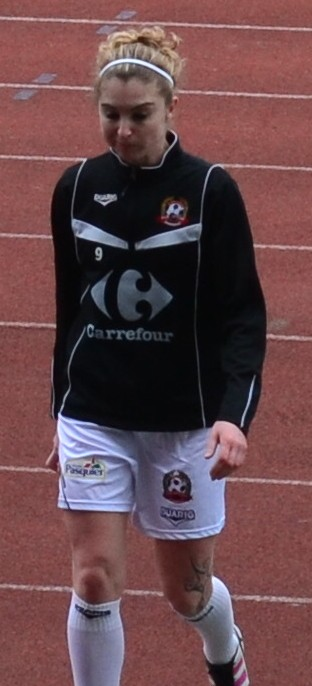
- Tonazzi with Juvisy in 2012

Personal information
- Full name: Laëtitia Françoise Andrée Tonazzi
- Date of birth: 31 January 1981 (age 45)
- Place of birth: Créteil, France
- Height: 5 ft 8 in (1.73 m)
- Position: Striker

Youth career
- 1992–1995: Plessis Trévise

Senior career*
Years	Team	Apps	(Gls)
1995–2001	VGA Saint-Maur		
2001–2012	Juvisy	181	(145)
2012–2014	Lyon	38	(32)
2014–2018	Montpellier	44	(20)

International career
2002–2014	France	66	(15)
- * Club domestic league appearances and goals as of 23:41, 19 September 2023

Laëtitia Françoise Andrée "Toto" Tonazzi (born 31 January 1981) is a former French footballer who played for Montpellier of the Division 1 Féminine. She played as a striker and was a member of the France women's national football team. She is known for her impressive strike rate for her club and country. During the 2007–08 season, Tonazzi scored a career-high 27 goals, which included scoring five on the final match day against the women's section of Évreux FC, formerly Évreux AC.

== Career ==
Tonazzi began her career at age 14 playing for VGA Saint-Maur. Saint-Maur had been a dominating force in French women's football during the late 1980s winning six league titles in between the years 1983 and 1990. In 2001, Tonazzi joined FCF Juvisy, who had taken over Saint-Maur as the most dominant French club by winning four of the ten titles awarded during the 90s. However, Juvisy lost control of the league heading into the new millennium with Toulouse taking over as the force. In Tonazzi's debut season with Juvisy (2001–02), she scored 14 goals. Her emerging talent led to her making her international debut for France. The following five years at Juvisy saw Tonazzi become an established international. She scored 68 league goals during the span and also helped Juvisy win two league titles (2002–03 and 2005–06), as well as a Challenge de France title in 2005.

During the 2007–08 season, Tonazzi scored a league high 27 goals in just 22 matches. She scored a career-high five goals on the final match day of the season against Évreux. The following season saw a decrease in goals as Tonazzi only appeared in 12 matches, however she contributed 15 goals. Juvisy finished in 3rd position, one point shy of qualifying for the newly created UEFA Women's Champions League.

== International career ==
Tonazzi made her international debut on 20 April 2002 in a 4–1 victory over the Czech Republic. Due to her amazing form domestically, she was selected to play at the 2003 FIFA Women's World Cup, where France suffered elimination in the group stage. She was among the leading goalscorers for her nation during the qualifying process for UEFA Women's Euro 2005 netting five. However, she would not be selected to play in the tournament. She made her return to major international play after she was selected by Bruno Bini to play in UEFA Women's Euro 2009. However, she did not make an appearance.

== Career statistics ==
Updated 7 July 2015

Club	Season	League		Cup		Continental		Total	
Club	Season	Apps	Goals	Apps	Goals	Apps	Goals	Apps	Goals
Juvisy	2001–02	3	0	0	0	0	0	3	0
Juvisy	2002–03	3	3	0	0	0	0	3	3
Juvisy	2003–04	24	18	0	0	3	2	27	20
Juvisy	2004–05	15	12	1	1	0	0	16	13
Juvisy	2005–06	22	14	0	0	0	0	22	14
Juvisy	2006–07	22	16	0	0	3	4	25	20
Juvisy	2007–08	21	27	4	2	0	0	25	29
Juvisy	2008–09	12	15	1	3	0	0	13	18
Juvisy	2009–10	16	12	4	3	0	0	20	15
Juvisy	2010–11	22	20	4	4	9	9	35	33
Juvisy	2011–12	21	8	3	3	0	0	24	11
Juvisy	Total	181	145	17	16	15	15	213	176
Lyon	2012–13	17	17	4	10	8	6	29	33
Lyon	2013–14	21	15	3	0	4	2	28	17
Lyon	Total	38	32	7	10	12	8	57	50
Montpellier	2014–15	20	6	5	3	0	0	25	9
Career total		239	183	29	29	27	23	295	235
